= 2022–23 Huddersfield Town A.F.C. season =

Huddersfield Town
2022–23 season
- Chairman: Dean Hoyle
- Head coach: Carlos Corberán (until 7 July); Danny Schofield (7 July to 14 September); Paul Harsley and Narcís Pèlach (caretaker, 14 to 28 September); Mark Fotheringham (28 September–8 February); Narcís Pèlach (caretaker, 8–15 February); Neil Warnock (from 16 February)
- Stadium: John Smith's Stadium
- Championship: 18th
- FA Cup: Third round
- EFL Cup: First round
- Top goalscorer: League: Matty Pearson; Jordan Rhodes; Danny Ward (5 each); All: Jordan Rhodes (6)
- Highest home attendance: 21,585 vs. Reading (8 May 2023)
- Lowest home attendance: 5,550 vs. Preston North End (9 August 2022)
- Biggest win: 3–1 vs. Stoke City (13 August 2022); 2–0 vs. Hull City (9 October 2022); 2–0 vs. Rotherham United (29 December 2022); 4–2 vs. Middlesbrough (1 April 2023)
- Biggest defeat: 0–4 vs. Burnley (25 February 2023); 0–4 vs. Coventry City (4 March 2023)
Home colours	Away colours	Third colours

The 2022–23 season was the 114th season in the existence of Huddersfield Town and the club's fourth consecutive season in the EFL Championship. In addition to the league, they also competed in the FA Cup and the EFL Cup.

Carlos Corberán resigned as Head Coach on 7 July, just 22 days before the start of the season, with Danny Schofield replacing him as the new Head Coach, but he was relieved of his duties on 14 September 2022, following a run of 1 win in their opening 8 league games. He would be replaced two weeks later by Hertha BSC assistant coach Mark Fotheringham, who signed a deal until June 2025 with the Terriers, but he was sacked on 8 February 2023, following a poor run of form. Neil Warnock would return to manage the Terriers 30 years after originally being appointed as their manager, signing a short-term contract on 13 February, and officially taking charge 3 days later.

== First-team squad ==
As of 1 April 2023.

No.	Player	Nationality	Date of birth	Signed from	Apps	Goals
Goalkeepers
1	Tomáš Vaclík	(Czech Republic)	29 March 1989 (age 37)	(Greece) Olympiacos	9	0
21	Lee Nicholls	(England)	5 October 1992 (age 33)	(England) Milton Keynes Dons	75	0
40	Jordan Smith	(England)	8 December 1994 (age 31)	(England) Nottingham Forest	0	0
Defenders
2	Ollie Turton	(England)	6 December 1992 (age 33)	(England) Blackpool	62	0
4	Matty Pearson	(England)	3 August 1993 (age 33)	(England) Luton Town	53	7
12	Will Boyle	(England)	1 September 1995 (age 31)	(England) Cheltenham Town	20	0
14	Josh Ruffels	(England)	23 October 1993 (age 32)	(England) Oxford United	37	3
23	Rarmani Edmonds-Green	(England)	14 January 1999 (age 27)	(England) Huddersfield Town B	36	2
32	Tom Lees	(England)	28 November 1990 (age 35)	(England) Sheffield Wednesday	84	7
33	Yuta Nakayama	(Japan)	16 February 1997 (age 29)	(Netherlands) PEC Zwolle	15	2
38	Matthew Lowton	(England)	9 June 1989 (age 37)	(England) Burnley	9	0
39	Michał Helik	(Poland)	9 September 1995 (age 31)	(England) Barnsley	30	2
Midfielders
6	Jonathan Hogg	(England)	6 December 1988 (age 37)	(England) Watford	331	5
8	Tino Anjorin	(England)	23 November 2001 (age 24)	(England) Chelsea	17	3
10	Josh Koroma	(England)	8 November 1998 (age 27)	(England) Leyton Orient	81	15
11	Connor Mahoney	(England)	12 February 1997 (age 29)	(England) Millwall	10	0
15	Scott High	(Scotland)	15 February 2001 (age 25)	(England) Huddersfield Town B	47	0
16	Joseph Hungbo	(England)	15 January 2000 (age 26)	(England) Watford	10	1
18	David Kasumu	(Nigeria)	5 October 1999 (age 26)	(England) Milton Keynes Dons	27	0
19	Duane Holmes	(United States)	6 November 1994 (age 31)	(England) Derby County	119	11
22	Jack Rudoni	(England)	14 June 2001 (age 25)	(England) AFC Wimbledon	41	0
24	Etienne Camara	(France)	30 March 2003 (age 23)	(France) Angers SCO	23	0
29	Rolando Aarons	(Jamaica)	16 November 1995 (age 30)	(England) Newcastle United	12	0
50	Anthony Knockaert	(France)	20 November 1991 (age 34)	(England) Fulham	5	0
Forwards
9	Jordan Rhodes	(Scotland)	5 February 1990 (age 36)	(England) Sheffield Wednesday	209	97
25	Danny Ward	(England)	11 December 1991 (age 34)	(Wales) Cardiff City	237	40
27	Tyreece Simpson	(England)	7 February 2002 (age 24)	(England) Ipswich Town	9	0
44	Florian Kamberi	(Albania)	8 March 1995 (age 31)	(Switzerland) FC Winterthur	2	1
49	Martyn Waghorn	(England)	23 January 1990 (age 36)	(England) Coventry City	11	1

== Transfers ==
=== Transfers in ===
Date	Position	Nationality	Name	From	Fee	Ref.
1 July 2022 (Note: The transfer was announced on 6 June and would become official on 1 July when his Cheltenham Town contract expired.)	CB	(England)	Will Boyle	(England) Cheltenham Town	Free Transfer	
1 July 2022 (Note: The transfer was announced on 10 May and would become official on 1 July when his Crystal Palace contract expired.)	GK	(England)	Francis Hurl	(England) Crystal Palace	Free Transfer	
6 July 2022	CM	(Nigeria)	David Kasumu	(England) Milton Keynes Dons	Compensation	
6 July 2022	AM	(England)	Connor Mahoney	(England) Millwall	Free Transfer	
13 July 2022	CF	(England)	Kyle Hudlin	(England) Solihull Moors	Compensation	
15 July 2022	CB	(Japan)	Yuta Nakayama	(Netherlands) PEC Zwolle	Free Transfer	
15 July 2022	AM	(England)	Jack Rudoni	(England) AFC Wimbledon	Undisclosed	
25 July 2022	GK	(England)	Josh Mazfari	(England) Thornaby	Free Transfer	
1 September 2022	CF	(England)	Tyreece Simpson	(England) Ipswich Town	Undisclosed	
1 September 2022	CB	(Poland)	Michał Helik	(England) Barnsley	Undisclosed	
5 January 2023	CF	(Albania)	Florian Kamberi	(Switzerland) FC Winterthur	Free Transfer	
31 January 2023	GK	(Czech Republic)	Tomáš Vaclík	(Greece) Olympiacos	Undisclosed	

=== Loans in ===
Date from	Position	Nationality	Name	From	Date until	Ref.
22 July 2022	AM	(England)	Tino Anjorin	(England) Chelsea	End of Season	
12 August 2022	RB	(England)	Kaine Kesler-Hayden	(England) Aston Villa	15 January 2023 (Note: On 15 January, Kesler-Hayden's loan was ended early, and he returned to Aston Villa.)	
1 September 2022	CB	(England)	Luke Mbete	(England) Manchester City	31 January 2023 (Note: On 31 January, Mbete's loan was ended early, and he returned to Manchester City)	
4 January 2023	RB	(England)	Matthew Lowton	(England) Burnley	End of Season	
11 January 2023	RW	(France)	Anthony Knockaert	(England) Fulham	End of Season	
13 January 2023	FW	(England)	Martyn Waghorn	(England) Coventry City	End of Season	
16 January 2023	RW	(England)	Joseph Hungbo	(England) Watford	End of Season	
1 February 2023	GK	(England)	Jordan Smith	(England) Nottingham Forest	End of Season	

=== Loans out ===
Date from	Position	Nationality	Name	To	Date until	Ref.
10 June 2022 (Note: The loan agreement was announced on 2 June, and would become active on 10 June, once the transfer window opened)	CF	(England)	Kian Harratt	(England) Bradford City	4 November 2022 (Note: Harratt's loan deal was supposed to be a season long loan, but on 4 November, his loan was terminated after allegations of Harratt being involved with hare coursing.)	
21 June 2022	AM	(England)	Josh Austerfield	(England) Harrogate Town	31 January 2023 (Note: Austerfield's loan deal was supposed to be a season long loan, but on 31 January, his loan was terminated, so he could join Morecambe on loan.)	
21 June 2022	CB	(England)	Romoney Crichlow	(England) Bradford City	End of Season	
21 June 2022	LB	(England)	Jaheim Headley	(England) Harrogate Town	9 January 2023 (Note: On 9 January, Headley was recalled back from his loan at Harrogate)	
27 June 2022	AM	(England)	Matty Daly	(England) Harrogate Town	End of Season	
15 July 2022	CF	(England)	Kyle Hudlin	(England) AFC Wimbledon	4 January 2023 (Note: On 4 January, Hudlin was recalled back from his loan with AFC Wimbledon)	
29 July 2022	CM	(Scotland)	Scott High	(England) Rotherham United	11 January 2023 (Note: On 11 January, High returned from his loan with Rotherham early)	
6 August 2022	LB	(England) (Zimbabwe)	Shane Maroodza	(England) Bradford (Park Avenue)	1 September 2022	
9 August 2022	GK	(Uganda)	Giosue Bellagambi	(England) Hyde United	6 October 2022 (Note: On 6 October, Bellagambi was recalled back from his loan at Hyde)	
12 August 2022	GK	(England)	Michael Roxburgh	(England) Brighouse Town	29 October 2022	
19 August 2022	GK	(England)	Sam Taylor	(England) Northallerton Town	Work Experience	
26 August 2022	CF	(England)	Kieran Phillips	(England) Morecambe	16 January 2023 (Note: On 16 January, Phillips' loan with Morecambe was ended, owing to a long-term injury)	
26 August 2022	GK	(England)	Ryan Schofield	(Scotland) Hibernian	27 January 2023 (Note: On 27 January, Schofield was recalled back from Hibernian)	
30 August 2022	LW	(Jamaica)	Rolando Aarons	(Scotland) Motherwell	2 November 2022 (Note: On 2 November, Aarons had his loan at Motherwell cancelled owing to him being injured)	
1 September 2022	GK	(Australia)	Jacob Chapman	(England) Salford City	1 January 2023	
1 September 2022	RW	(Republic of Ireland)	Danny Grant	(England) Harrogate Town	End of Season	
1 September 2022	CB	(England)	Rarmani Edmonds-Green	(England) Wigan Athletic	11 January 2023 (Note: On 11 January, Edmonds-Green was recalled back from his loan at Wigan)	
1 September 2022	CF	(England)	Josh Koroma	(England) Portsmouth	11 January 2023 (Note: On 11 January, Koroma returned from his loan with Portsmouth early)	
17 September 2022	LB	(England)	Luke Daley	(England) Gateshead	14 November 2022 (Note: On 14 October, Daley had his loan at Gateshead extended for another month)	
7 October 2022	GK	(Uganda)	Giosue Bellagambi	(England) Spennymoor Town	2 January 2023	
14 October 2022	CM	(England)	Sonny Whittingham	(England) Hyde United	10 December 2022 (Note: On 12 November, Whittingham had his loan at Hyde extended for another month.)	
14 October 2022	CB	(England)	Archie Sheppard	(England) Bury	Work Experience	
14 October 2022	CF	(England)	Fope Deru	(England) Bury	Work Experience	
18 October 2022	CM	(England)	Dylan Helliwell	(England) Glossop North End	15 November 2022	
18 October 2022	RW	(England)	Cian Philpott	(England) Glossop North End	15 November 2022	
25 October 2022	GK	(England)	Josh Mazfari	(England) Liversedge	24 November 2022	
11 November 2022	GK	(England)	Michael Roxburgh	(England) Marske United	End of Season	
7 January 2023	GK	(England)	Josh Mazfari	(England) Tadcaster Albion	30 April 2023 (Note: On 2 March, Mazfari had his loan at Tadcaster extended until the end of April.)	
15 January 2023	CB	(England)	David Adewoju	(England) Bradford (Park Avenue)	11 February 2023	
15 January 2023	LW	(England)	Donay O’Brien-Brady	(England) Hyde United	11 February 2023	
25 January 2023	RW	(Wales)	Sorba Thomas	(England) Blackburn Rovers	End of Season	
31 January 2023	AM	(England)	Josh Austerfield	(England) Morecambe	End of Season	
31 January 2023	CB	(Republic of the Congo)	Loick Ayina	(Scotland) Dundee United	End of Season	
31 January 2023	GK	(Uganda)	Giosue Bellagambi	(England) Salford City	End of Season	
31 January 2023	RB	(England)	Aaron Rowe	(England) Stockport County	End of Season	
31 January 2023	GK	(England)	Ryan Schofield	(England) Crawley Town	End of Season	
3 February 2023	DM	(Albania)	Ernaldo Krasniqi	(England) Chelmsford City	3 March 2023	
15 February 2023	LB	(Equatorial Guinea)	Charles Ondo	(Republic of Ireland) Waterford	End of Season	
25 February 2023	GK	(England)	Michael Acquah	(England) Sheffield	27 March 2023	
14 March 2023	CM	(England)	Myles Bright	(England) Hemel Hempstead Town	End of Season	
18 March 2023	CM	(England)	Tom Iorpenda	(England) Hyde United	End of Season	
20 March 2023	RW	(Northern Ireland)	Conor Falls	(England) Liversedge	End of Season	
20 March 2023	AM	(England)	Michael Stone	(England) Liversedge	End of Season	
23 March 2023	GK	(England)	Francis Hurl	(England) Golcar United	End of Season	
24 March 2023	GK	(England)	Michael Roxburgh	(England) AFC Fylde	End of Season	

=== Transfers out ===
Date	Position	Nationality	Name	To	Fee	Ref.
23 June 2022	RB	(Spain)	Pipa	(Greece) Olympiacos	Undisclosed	
30 June 2022	GK	(England)	Jamal Blackman	(England) Exeter City	Released	
30 June 2022	CM	(England)	Luke Billam	Unattached	Released	
30 June 2022	CM	(England)	Reece Brown	(England) Forest Green Rovers	Released	
30 June 2022	CF	(England)	Fraizer Campbell	Unattached	Released	
30 June 2022	GK	(England)	Max Dearnley	(England) Farsley Celtic	Released	
30 June 2022	DM	(Netherlands)	Carel Eiting	(Netherlands) FC Volendam	Released	
30 June 2022	CF	(England)	Kit Elliott	Unattached	Released	
30 June 2022	CB	(England)	Nassim Kherbouche	(England) Salisbury	Released	
30 June 2022	CF	(Kenya)	Micah Obiero	(England) Boston United	Released	
30 June 2022	CB	(Republic of Ireland)	Josh Okpolokpo	(England) Leiston	Released	
30 June 2022	MF	(England)	Sam Sharrock-Peplow	Unattached	Released	
30 June 2022	CB	(Senegal)	Naby Sarr	(England) Reading	Released	
30 June 2022	CB	(England)	Jeremy Stewart	(England) Hanwell Town	Released	
30 June 2022	DM	(Spain)	Álex Vallejo	(Cyprus) Doxa Katokopias	Released	
20 July 2022	CM	(England)	Lewis O'Brien	(England) Nottingham Forest	Undisclosed	
20 July 2022	LB	(England)	Harry Toffolo	(England) Nottingham Forest	Undisclosed	
21 January 2023	AM	(England)	Connor Shanks	(England) Spennymoor Town	Released	
31 January 2023	CM	(Jamaica)	Jon Russell	(England) Barnsley	Undisclosed	

== Pre-season and friendlies ==
On 8 June, Huddersfield announced two pre-season friendlies, against Bolton Wanderers and Harrogate Town. Two days later, a trip to Doncaster Rovers was confirmed. A behind closed doors friendly at the Canalside Training Ground was announced against Morecambe.

During the mid-season winter break, Town visited Marbella for a training camp, where they would face Olympiacos in a friendly.

=== First Team friendlies ===
12 July 2022 Friendly	Huddersfield Town	3–1	Morecambe	Huddersfield
14:00 BST	Jackson 40', 44'; Rhodes 84'	Report	Obika 66'	Stadium: Millers Oils High Performance Complex; Attendance: 0 (Behind closed doors)

16 July 2022 Friendly	Harrogate Town	1–0	Huddersfield Town	Harrogate
12:00 BST	Richards 20'	Report		Stadium: The EnviroVent Stadium

16 July 2022 Friendly	Doncaster Rovers	1–0	Huddersfield Town	Doncaster
15:00 BST	Trialist 73' (pen.)	Report		Stadium: Eco-Power Stadium

23 July 2022 Friendly	Tranmere Rovers	1–4	Huddersfield Town	Birkenhead
12:00 BST	McAlear 35'	Report	Jackson 44'; Diarra 51'; Rhodes 56'; Grant 76'	Stadium: Prenton Park

23 July 2022 Friendly	Bolton Wanderers	1–1	Huddersfield Town	Horwich
15:00 BST	Sadlier 90+4'	Report	Ward 45+1'	Stadium: University of Bolton Stadium

1 December 2022 Friendly	Huddersfield Town	0–2	Olympiacos	Marbella, Spain
16:00 CET		Report	Fortounis 39'; El-Arabi 72'	Stadium: TBA

=== B Team friendlies ===
2 July 2022 Friendly	Brighouse Town	1–3	Huddersfield Town B	Brighouse
15:00 BST	Normanton 36'	Report	Mumbongo 17'; Jackson 20'; Grant 78'	Stadium: Yorkshire Payments Stadium

5 July 2022 Friendly	Huddersfield Town B	2–2	Scunthorpe United	Huddersfield
13:00 BST	Mumbongo 6', 52' (pen.)	Report	Boyce 31'; Feeney 57'	Stadium: Millers Oils High Performance Complex

9 July 2022 Friendly	Huddersfield Town B	2–3	Stockport County	Huddersfield
12:00 BST	Jones 23', 27'	Report	Collar 11'; Madden 53'; Rydel 76'	Stadium: Millers Oils High Performance Complex

21 July 2022 Friendly	Macclesfield	1–2	Huddersfield Town B	Macclesfield
19:00 BST	Owens 67'	Report	Lloyd 61'; Stone 82'	Stadium: Leasing.com Stadium; Attendance: 670

25 July 2022 Friendly	(Northern Ireland) Loughgall	2–4	Huddersfield Town B	Loughgall
19:30 BST	Kelly 41'; Ferris 58' (pen.)	Report	Eccleston 2'; Falls 36'; Diarra 51', 86'	Stadium: Lakeview Park

27 July 2022 Friendly	(Northern Ireland) Coleraine	1–2	Huddersfield Town B	Coleraine
19:45 BST	Shevlin (penalty missed) 11'; McLaughlin 80'	Report	Falls 37'; Bright 83'	Stadium: The Showgrounds

30 July 2022 Friendly	Huddersfield Town B	2–2	Blackburn Rovers Academy	Huddersfield
11:30 BST	Boyle 34'; Phillips 88'	Report	6'; 24' (pen.)	Stadium: Millers Oils High Performance Complex; Attendance: 0 (Behind closed doors)

2 August 2022 Friendly	Huddersfield Town B	1–2	Sheffield United Academy	Huddersfield
13:00 BST	Grant 23'	Report	Osula 15'; Broadbent 83'	Stadium: Millers Oils High Performance Complex; Attendance: 0 (Behind closed doors)

9 August 2022 Friendly	Worksop Town	5–1	Huddersfield Town B	Worksop
19:15 BST	Hanson 22'; Valentine 34'; Brookes 47'; Tavares 65'; Bardack 72'	Report	Falls 17'	Stadium: Windsor Foodservice Stadium

== Competitions ==
=== Overall record ===
Competition	First match	Last match	Starting round	Final position	Record							
Competition	First match	Last match	Starting round	Final position	Pld	W	D	L	GF	GA	GD	Win %
Championship	29 July 2022	8 May 2023	Matchday 1		46	14	11	21	47	62	−15	30.43
FA Cup	7 January 2023	7 January 2023	Third round	Third round	1	0	0	1	1	3	−2	0.00
EFL Cup	9 August 2022	9 August 2022	First round	First round	1	0	0	1	1	4	−3	0.00
Total					48	14	11	23	49	69	−20	29.17

Last updated: 4 May 2023
Source: [Soccerway]

=== Championship ===
==== League table ====
Pos	Team	Pld	W	D	L	GF	GA	GD	Pts
15	Hull City	46	14	16	16	51	61	−10	58
16	Stoke City	46	14	11	21	55	54	+1	53
17	Birmingham City	46	14	11	21	47	58	−11	53
18	Huddersfield Town	46	14	11	21	47	62	−15	53
19	Rotherham United	46	11	17	18	49	60	−11	50
20	Queens Park Rangers	46	13	11	22	44	71	−27	50
21	Cardiff City	46	13	10	23	41	58	−17	49

Source: EFL Official Website
Rules for classification: 1) Points; 2) Goal difference; 3) Number of goals scored; 4) Head-to-head results; 5) Wins; 6) Away goals; 7) Penalty points (sec 9.5); 8) 12-point sending off offences

==== Results summary ====
Overall								Home						Away					
Pld	W	D	L	GF	GA	GD	Pts	W	D	L	GF	GA	GD	W	D	L	GF	GA	GD
45	13	11	21	45	62	−17	50	8	6	8	24	25	−1	5	5	13	21	37	−16

Last updated: 4 May 2023.
Source: [Soccerway]

==== Results by round ====
Round	1	2	3	4	5	6	7	8	9	10	11	12	13	14	15	16	17	18	19	20	21	22	23	24	25	26	27	28	29	30	31	32	33	34	35	36	37	38	39	40	41	42	43	44	45	46
Ground	H	A	H	A	H	A	H	H	H	A	A	H	A	H	A	H	H	A	A	H	A	H	A	H	H	A	A	H	A	A	A	H	A	H	H	A	H	A	H	A	H	A	A	A	H	H
Result	L	L	W	L	D	L	L	L	W	L	D	W	L	L	D	W	L	L	W	D	L	L	W	W	L	D	L	D	D	L	L	W	L	L	D	L	D	W	W	W	D	L	D	W	W	W
Position	24	23	14	18	23	23	23	23	23	23	23	23	23	23	24	23	24	24	24	24	24	24	24	22	23	22	22	22	22	23	23	22	22	24	23	23	23	22	22	20	19	19	19	19	18	18

Updated to match(es) played on 4 May 2023. Source: [Soccerway]
A = Away; H = Home; W = Win; D = Draw; L = Loss

==== Matches ====
The league fixtures were announced on 23 June 2022. Town's first fixture was a Sky Sports televised game against newly-relegated Burnley.

29 July 2022 1	Huddersfield Town	0–1	Burnley	Huddersfield
20:00 BST	Kasumu (yellow card) 84'	Report	Maatsen 18'; Cullen (yellow card) 58'; Taylor (yellow card) 66'	Stadium: John Smith's Stadium; Attendance: 20,206; Referee: James Linington
Note: Live on Sky Sports

5 August 2022 2	Birmingham City	2–1	Huddersfield Town	Bordesley
19:45 BST	Hogan 5'; Płacheta 45'; Trusty (yellow card) 58'	Report	Thomas (yellow card) 22'; Russell (yellow card) 32'; Ward 61'	Stadium: St Andrew's; Attendance: 17,065; Referee: Gavin Ward

13 August 2022 3	Huddersfield Town	3–1	Stoke City	Huddersfield
15:00 BST	Nakayama 40'; Ward 77'; Nicholls (yellow card) 85'; Rhodes 86'	Report	Baker (penalty missed) 21' 56' (yellow card) 79'; Brown (yellow card) 44'; Taylor (yellow card) 90+4'	Stadium: John Smith's Stadium; Attendance: 18,618; Referee: Matthew Donohue

16 August 2022 4	Norwich City	2–1	Huddersfield Town	Norwich
19:45 BST	Sargent 6'; Sinani 16'; Dowell (yellow card) 59'	Report	Lees (red card) 48'; Jones 81'	Stadium: Carrow Road; Attendance: 25,369; Referee: Josh Smith

20 August 2022	Coventry City	Postponed	Huddersfield Town	Coventry
15:00 BST				Stadium: Coventry Building Society Arena; Referee: Stephen Martin
Note: Match was postponed due to playing surface deemed to be unsafe and unplayable.

27 August 2022 5	Huddersfield Town	2–2	West Bromwich Albion	Huddersfield
15:00 BST	Anjorin 11', 30'; Rudoni (yellow card) 58'	Report	Wallace 37', 57'; Diangana (yellow card) 90+3'; Ajayi (yellow card) 90+5'	Stadium: John Smith's Stadium; Attendance: 18,696; Referee: Andy Davies

31 August 2022 6	Bristol City	2–0	Huddersfield Town	Ashton Gate
19:45 BST	Wells 35'; Semenyo 80'	Report		Stadium: Ashton Gate Stadium; Attendance: 18,569; Referee: Darren Bond

4 September 2022 7	Huddersfield Town	0–1	Blackpool	Huddersfield
15:00 BST		Report	Corbeanu 38'; Connolly (yellow card) 58'; Williams (yellow card) 63'; Yates (yellow card) 65'	Stadium: John Smith's Stadium; Attendance: 18,195; Referee: John Busby

10 September 2022	Queens Park Rangers	Postponed	Huddersfield Town	White City
15:00 BST				Stadium: Loftus Road; Referee: David Webb
Note: Match was postponed following the death of Elizabeth II.

13 September 2022 8	Huddersfield Town	1–2	Wigan Athletic	Huddersfield
19:45 BST	Mbete (yellow card) 23'; Thomas (yellow card) 45+3'; Lees 76'		Keane 25' (pen.); Lang (yellow card) 53' (goal) 82'; Shinnie (yellow card) 71'	Stadium: John Smith's Stadium; Attendance: 17,941; Referee: Jeremy Simpson

17 September 2022 9	Huddersfield Town	1–0	Cardiff City	Huddersfield
15:00 BST	Rhodes 8'; Rudoni (yellow card) 42'; Kasumu (yellow card) 69'; Jones (yellow card) 75'; Nicholls (yellow card) 89'	Report	Robinson (penalty missed) 21'	Stadium: John Smith's Stadium; Attendance: 19,193; Referee: Dean Whitestone

1 October 2022 10	Reading	3–1	Huddersfield Town	Reading
15:00 BST	McIntyre 29'; Nicholls 36' (o.g.); Méïté 81'	Report	Thomas (yellow card) 40'; Kasumu (yellow card) 49'; Mahoney (yellow card) 74'; Lees 90+4'	Stadium: Select Car Leasing Stadium; Attendance: 16,684; Referee: Oliver Langford

4 October 2022 11	Luton Town	3–3	Huddersfield Town	Luton
19:45 BST	Adebayo 18', 37'; Clark 45+1'	Report	Morris 11' (o.g.); Rhodes 32' (pen.); Jackson 70'; Kasumu (yellow card) 90+1' (yellow-red card) 90+4'	Stadium: Kenilworth Road; Attendance: 9,073; Referee: Leigh Doughty

9 October 2022 12	Huddersfield Town	2–0	Hull City	Huddersfield
12:00 BST	Coyle 29' (o.g.); Helik 51'; Nakayama (yellow card) 65'; Thomas (yellow card) 74'; Mahoney (yellow card) 82'; Ondo (yellow card) 90+7'	Report	Slater (yellow card) 50'; Christie (yellow card) 60'; Longman (yellow card) 68'	Stadium: John Smith's Stadium; Attendance: 18,628; Referee: Tim Robinson
Note: Live on Sky Sports

15 October 2022 13	Rotherham United	2–1	Huddersfield Town	Rotherham
12:30 BST	Washington 25'; Rathbone (yellow card) 42'; Kelly 61'; Harding (yellow card) 89'; Hall (yellow card) 90+3'	Report	Ward 29'; Holmes (yellow card) 60'; Nakayama (yellow card) 74'	Stadium: AESSEAL New York Stadium; Attendance: 11,006; Referee: Jeremy Simpson
Note: Live on Sky Sports

18 October 2022 14	Huddersfield Town	0–1	Preston North End	Huddersfield
19:45 BST	Kausmu (yellow card) 8'; Rhodes (yellow card) 41'; Holmes (yellow card) 75'; Camara (yellow card) 77'; Jackson (yellow card) 90+2'	Report	Cunningham 50'; Ledson (yellow card) 76'	Stadium: John Smith's Stadium; Attendance: 18,357; Referee: Andy Woolmer

22 October 2022 15	Middlesbrough	0–0	Huddersfield Town	Middlesbrough
15:00 BST	Lenihan (yellow card) 52'; Muniz (yellow card) 67'; Howson (yellow card) 90+4'	Report	Camara (yellow card) 66'	Stadium: Riverside Stadium; Attendance: 23,661; Referee: Andy Davies

29 October 2022 16	Huddersfield Town	1–0	Millwall	Huddersfield
15:00 BST	Nakayama 9'; Helik (yellow card) 78'; Thomas (yellow card) 84'	Report	Bradshaw (yellow card) 50'; Cresswell (yellow card) 54'; Burey (yellow card) 82'	Stadium: John Smith's Stadium; Attendance: 17,717; Referee: Stephen Martin

2 November 2022 17	Huddersfield Town	0–2	Sunderland	Huddersfield
19:45 GMT	Camara (yellow card) 43'; Holmes (yellow card) 82'	Report	Pritchard 55'; Batth (yellow card) 58'; Ba (yellow card) 87'; Diallo 90+6'	Stadium: John Smith's Stadium; Attendance: 19,341; Referee: Oliver Langford

5 November 2022 18	Blackburn Rovers	1–0	Huddersfield Town	Blackburn
15:00 GMT	Brereton Díaz 35'	Report	Rudoni (yellow card) 36'; Camara (yellow card) 40'; Kasumu (yellow card) 68'	Stadium: Ewood Park; Attendance: 15,179; Referee: James Linington

8 November 2022 19	Queens Park Rangers	1–2	Huddersfield Town	White City
19:45 GMT	Dykes 2'	Report	Ruffels 9', 26'; Diarra (yellow card) 40'; Spencer (yellow card) 45'; Ward (yellow card) 75'; Thomas (yellow card) 89'; Nicholls (yellow card) 90+1'; Rhodes (yellow card) 90+5'	Stadium: Loftus Road; Attendance: 12,769; Referee: Gavin Ward

12 November 2022 20	Huddersfield Town	0–0	Swansea City	Huddersfield
15:00 GMT	Mbete (yellow card) 59'	Report	Ntcham (yellow card) 41'; Oko-Flex (yellow card) 89'	Stadium: John Smith's Stadium; Attendance: 17,852; Referee: Ben Toner

10 December 2022 21	Sheffield United	1–0	Huddersfield Town	Sheffield
15:00 GMT	Sharp 15'; Baldock (yellow card) 73'; Ahmedhodžić (yellow card) 83'	Report	Thomas (yellow card) 31'; Hogg (yellow card) 59'	Stadium: Bramall Lane; Attendance: 27,794; Referee: Darren Bond

17 December 2022 22	Huddersfield Town	0–2	Watford	Huddersfield
15:00 GMT	Diarra (yellow card) 17'; Hogg (yellow card) 20'	Report	Bacuna (yellow card) 28'; Pedro 54', 86'; Sema (yellow card) 81'	Stadium: John Smith's Stadium; Attendance: 18,434; Referee: Leigh Doughty

26 December 2022 23	Preston North End	1–2	Huddersfield Town	Preston
15:00 GMT	Cunningham 34' (yellow card) 56'; Evans (yellow card) 90+5'	Report	Kasumu (yellow card) 14'; Hogg (yellow card) 26'; Rhodes 76'; Kesler-Hayden 85'; Holmes (yellow card) 90+5'	Stadium: Deepdale; Attendance: 16,982; Referee: Geoff Eltringham

29 December 2022 24	Huddersfield Town	2–0	Rotherham United	Huddersfield
19:45 GMT	Rudoni (yellow card) 11'; Holmes 31'; Hogg (yellow card) 43'; Rhodes 56'; Boyle (yellow card) 73'	Report	Bramall (yellow card) 33'; Harding (yellow card) 42'	Stadium: John Smith's Stadium; Attendance: 19,378; Referee: Jeremy Simpson

1 January 2023 25	Huddersfield Town	1–2	Luton Town	Huddersfield
15:00 GMT	Holmes 25'; Boyle (yellow card) 35'	Report	Bell 43'; Doughty (yellow card) 58'; Lockyer (yellow card) 61'; Burke 84' (yellow card) 84'	Stadium: John Smith's Stadium; Attendance: 18,333; Referee: Matthew Donohue

14 January 2023 26	Hull City	1–1	Huddersfield Town	Kingston upon Hull
15:00 GMT	Estupiñán 90+8'	Report	Helik 21'; Rudoni (yellow card) 54'; Holmes (yellow card) 57'	Stadium: MKM Stadium; Attendance: 17,928; Referee: Thomas Bramall

21 January 2023	Blackpool	Postponed	Huddersfield Town	Blackpool
15:00 GMT				Stadium: Bloomfield Road; Referee: Graham Scott
Note: Postponed owing to a frozen pitch at Bloomfield Road.

28 January 2023 27	Coventry City	2–0	Huddersfield Town	Coventry
15:00 GMT	Panzo (yellow card) 4'; Hamer 53'; Palmer 71'	Report	Helik (yellow card) 52'; Lowton (yellow card) 89'	Stadium: Coventry Building Society Arena; Attendance: 17,557; Referee: Seb Stockbridge
Note: Originally to be played on 24 January, the game was moved on 18 January, with both teams out of the 2022–23 FA Cup, the game was moved to a Saturday.

4 February 2023 28	Huddersfield Town	1–1	Queens Park Rangers	Huddersfield
15:00 GMT	Waghorn 39'; Hogg (yellow card) 41'; Rudoni (yellow card) 90+4'	Report	Lowe 13'; Clarke-Salter (yellow card) 37'; Adomah (yellow card) 72'	Stadium: John Smith's Stadium; Attendance: 17,954; Referee: Geoff Eltringham

7 February 2023 29	Blackpool	2–2	Huddersfield Town	Blackpool
19:45 GMT	Madine (red card) 45+4'; Lyons 82'; Dougall (yellow card) 84'; Bowler 90'	Report	High (yellow card) 28'; Pearson 36'; Rudoni (yellow card) 45+2'; Koroma 86'; Knockaert (yellow card) 87'	Stadium: Bloomfield Road; Attendance: 11,164; Referee: Graham Scott

11 February 2023 30	Wigan Athletic	1–0	Huddersfield Town	Wigan
15:00 GMT	Tiéhi (yellow card) 66'; Whatmough 82'	Report	Waghorn (yellow card) 22'	Stadium: DW Stadium; Attendance: 12,268; Referee: Gavin Ward

15 February 2023 31	Stoke City	3–0	Huddersfield Town	Stoke-on-Trent
19:45 GMT	Jagielka 13'; Pearson (yellow card) 45+1'; Brown 73'; Baker (yellow card) 90+1' (goal) 90+4' (pen.)	Report	Pearson (yellow card) 17'; Hogg (yellow card) 42'; Rudoni (yellow card) 47'; Boyle (yellow card) 51' (yellow-red card) 64'	Stadium: bet365 Stadium; Attendance: 17,700; Referee: James Linington

18 February 2023 32	Huddersfield Town	2–1	Birmingham City	Huddersfield
15:00 GMT	Hungbo 25'; Headley 49'; Camara (yellow card) 75'	Report	Deeney 6'; Colin (yellow card) 31'	Stadium: John Smith's Stadium; Attendance: 19,564; Referee: John Busby

25 February 2023 33	Burnley	4–0	Huddersfield Town	Burnley
15:00 GMT	Barnes 7'; Roberts 18'; Brownhill 31'; Obafemi 74'	Report	Koroma (yellow card) 31'; Headley (yellow card) 47'	Stadium: Turf Moor; Attendance: 20,711; Referee: Matthew Donohue

4 March 2023 34	Huddersfield Town	0–4	Coventry City	Huddersfield
15:00 GMT		Report	Howley (yellow card) 24'; Gyökeres 31', 59'; Hamer 55'; Walker 90+3'	Stadium: John Smith's Stadium; Attendance: 19,958; Referee: David Webb

7 March 2023 35	Huddersfield Town	0–0	Bristol City	Huddersfield
19:45 GMT	Jackson (yellow card) 14'; Pearson (yellow card) 26'; Hogg (yellow card) 45+3'	Report	Vyner (yellow card) 67'; Pring (yellow card) 88'	Stadium: John Smith's Stadium; Attendance: 17,177; Referee: Leigh Doughty

11 March 2023 36	West Bromwich Albion	1–0	Huddersfield Town	West Bromwich
15:00 GMT	Swift 30' (pen.); O'Shea (yellow card) 80'	Report		Stadium: The Hawthorns; Attendance: 24,685; Referee: Dean Whitestone

15 March 2023 37	Huddersfield Town	1–1	Norwich City	Huddersfield
19:45 GMT	Hanley 65' (o.g.)	Report	Sara 26'; Aarons (yellow card) 53'; Gunn (yellow card) 64'; Marquinhos (red card) 90+2'; McLean (yellow card) 90+5'	Stadium: John Smith's Stadium; Attendance: 18,116; Referee: Keith Stroud

18 March 2023 38	Millwall	0–1	Huddersfield Town	Bermondsey
15:00 GMT	Voglsammer (yellow card) 57'; Cooper (yellow card) 83'	Report	Pearson (yellow card) 37'; Waghorn (yellow card) 43'; Koroma (yellow card) 62'; Ward 67'	Stadium: The Den; Attendance: 14,968; Referee: Andy Davies

1 April 2023 39	Huddersfield Town	4–2	Middlesbrough	Huddersfield
15:00 BST	Ruffels 46'; Rudoni (yellow card) 52'; Koroma 54' (yellow card) 80'; Pearson 57', 66'	Report	Forss 43'; Hackney (yellow card) 62'; Akpom 74'; Smith (yellow card) 80'	Stadium: John Smith's Stadium; Attendance: 20,186; Referee: John Busby

7 April 2023 40	Watford	2–3	Huddersfield Town	Watford
15:00 BST	Porteous (yellow card) 14'; Asprilla 32'; João Pedro (yellow card) 54'; Assombalonga 90+2'; Choudhury (yellow card) 90+3'; Bachmann (yellow card) 90+7' (yellow-red card) 90+7'	Report	Rudoni 40'; Pearson 55'; Kasumu (yellow card) 60'; Harratt 82'; Hogg (yellow card) 90+3'	Stadium: Vicarage Road; Attendance: 19,511; Referee: David Webb

10 April 2023 41	Huddersfield Town	2–2	Blackburn Rovers	Huddersfield
12:30 BST	Pearson 16'; Rudoni 22'	Report	Carter (yellow card) 24'; Rankin-Costello (yellow card) 45', (goal) 47'; Szmodics (yellow card) 75'; Hedges 90+1'	Stadium: John Smith's Stadium; Attendance: 20,887; Referee: Stephen Martin

15 April 2023 42	Swansea City	1–0	Huddersfield Town	Landore
15:00 BST	Fulton (yellow card) 5'; Cabango (yellow card) 11'; Piroe (yellow card) 37'; Manning 69'; Fisher (yellow card) 90+5'	Report	Hogg (yellow card) 43'; Rudoni (yellow card) 90'	Stadium: Swansea.com Stadium; Attendance: 16,686; Referee: Matthew Donohue

18 April 2023 43	Sunderland	1–1	Huddersfield Town	Sunderland
19:45 BST	Neil (yellow card) 14'; Gelhardt 35'; Batth (yellow card) 87'; Clarke (yellow card) 90+3'	Report	Headley (yellow card) 47'; Koroma 59'; Kasumu (yellow card) 67'	Stadium: Stadium of Light; Attendance: 37,065; Referee: Leigh Doughty

30 April 2023 44	Cardiff City	1–2	Huddersfield Town	Leckwith
12:00 BST	McGuinness (yellow card) 68'; Davies 83'	Report	Hungbo 61'; Simpson 69' (o.g.)	Stadium: Cardiff City Stadium; Attendance: 26,804; Referee: Michael Salisbury

4 May 2023 45	Huddersfield Town	1–0	Sheffield United	Huddersfield
19:45 BST	Ward 59'; Rudoni (yellow card) 85'	Report	Egan (yellow card) 22'; Doyle (yellow card) 90+1'	Stadium: John Smith's Stadium; Attendance: 20,172; Referee: John Busby

8 May 2023 46	Huddersfield Town	2–0	Reading	Huddersfield
15:00 BST	Koroma 49'; Hungbo 85'		Sarr (yellow card) 59'	Stadium: John Smith's Stadium; Attendance: 21,585; Referee: Joshua Smith

=== FA Cup ===
Huddersfield entered the competition in the third round and were drawn away to Preston North End.

7 January 2023 Third round	Preston North End	3–1	Huddersfield Town	Preston
12:30 GMT	Lees 60' (o.g.); Diaby 73'; Browne 85'	Report	Ayina (yellow card) 18'; Kamberi 57'; Kasumu (yellow card) 59'; Helik (yellow card) 71'	Stadium: Deepdale; Attendance: 6,799; Referee: Anthony Backhouse

=== EFL Cup ===
The first round of the EFL Cup was drawn on 23 June 2022 by Clinton Morrison and Michael Dawson.

9 August 2022 First round	Huddersfield Town	1–4	Preston North End	Huddersfield
19:45 BST	Rhodes 67'; Spencer (yellow card) 69'	Report	Parrott 6'; McCann 20', 30'; Potts 51'; Woodburn (yellow card) 78'	Stadium: John Smith's Stadium; Attendance: 5,550; Referee: Ross Joyce

== Squad statistics ==
As of match played 8 May 2023.

No.	Pos.	Name	League		FA Cup		EFL Cup		Total		Discipline	
No.	Pos.	Name	Apps	Goals	Apps	Goals	Apps	Goals	Apps	Goals	Yellow card	Red card
1	GK	(Czech Republic) Tomáš Vaclík	13	0	0	0	0	0	13	0	0	0
2	DF	(England) Ollie Turton	16+2	0	0	0	0	0	16+2	0	0	0
4	DF	(England) Matty Pearson	17+1	5	0	0	0	0	17+1	5	3	0
6	MF	(England) Jonathan Hogg	28+2	0	0	0	0	0	28+2	0	9	0
7	MF	(Wales) Sorba Thomas	20+3	0	1	0	0+1	0	21+4	0	7	0
8	MF	(England) Tino Anjorin	6+2	2	0	0	0+1	0	6+3	2	0	0
9	FW	(Scotland) Jordan Rhodes	15+19	5	0	0	1	1	16+19	6	2	0
10	MF	(England) Josh Koroma	13+6	4	0	0	1	0	14+6	4	3	0
11	MF	(England) Connor Mahoney	0+9	0	0	0	1	0	1+9	0	2	0
12	DF	(England) Will Boyle	8+8	0	0+1	0	1	0	9+9	0	2	1
14	DF	(England) Josh Ruffels	28+5	3	0	0	0	0	28+5	3	0	0
15	MF	(Scotland) Scott High	6+3	0	0	0	0	0	6+3	0	1	0
16	MF	(England) Joseph Hungbo	8+6	3	0	0	0	0	8+6	3	0	0
18	MF	(Nigeria) David Kasumu	26+7	0	1	0	0	0	27+7	0	9	1
19	MF	(United States) Duane Holmes	20+7	2	0+1	0	1	0	21+8	2	5	0
20	MF	(England) Aaron Rowe	0+1	0	0	0	0	0	0+1	0	0	0
21	GK	(England) Lee Nicholls	28	0	0	0	1	0	29	0	3	0
22	MF	(England) Jack Rudoni	42+4	2	1	0	0+1	0	43+5	2	11	0
23	DF	(England) Rarmani Edmonds-Green	10+1	0	0	0	0+1	0	10+2	0	0	0
24	MF	(France) Etienne Camara	13+7	0	1	0	1	0	15+7	0	5	0
25	FW	(England) Danny Ward	29+7	5	0	0	0	0	29+7	5	1	0
26	FW	(Wales) Pat Jones	0+6	1	0	0	0	0	0+6	1	1	0
27	FW	(England) Tyreece Simpson	0+9	0	1	0	0	0	1+9	0	0	0
30	DF	(England) Ben Jackson	12+7	1	0	0	0+1	0	12+8	1	2	0
32	DF	(England) Tom Lees	42	2	1	0	1	0	44	2	0	1
33	DF	(Japan) Yuta Nakayama	13+1	2	0	0	1	0	14+1	2	2	0
34	DF	(Northern Ireland) Brodie Spencer	3+1	0	0	0	1	0	4+1	0	2	0
35	MF	(Mali) Brahima Diarra	7+13	0	0+1	0	0	0	7+14	0	2	0
36	FW	(England) Kian Harratt	0+3	1	0+1	0	0	0	0+4	1	0	0
38	DF	(England) Matthew Lowton	6+2	0	1	0	0	0	7+2	0	1	0
39	DF	(Poland) Michał Helik	36	2	1	0	0	0	37	2	3	0
41	GK	(Australia) Nicholas Bilokapic	5+1	0	1	0	0	0	6+1	0	0	0
44	FW	(Albania) Florian Kamberi	0+1	0	0+1	1	0	0	0+2	1	0	0
45	FW	(Equatorial Guinea) Charles Ondo	0+2	0	0	0	0	0	0+2	0	1	0
47	DF	(Republic of the Congo) Loick Ayina	0	0	1	0	0	0	1	0	1	0
48	DF	(England) Jaheim Headley	9+2	1	0	0	0	0	9+2	1	2	0
49	FW	(England) Martyn Waghorn	7+6	1	0	0	0	0	7+6	1	2	0
50	MF	(France) Anthony Knockaert	2+3	0	0	0	0	0	2+3	0	1	0
—	—	Own goals	–	4	–	0	–	0	–	4	–	–
Players who left the club during the season:
3	DF	(England) Luke Mbete	3+3	0	0	0	0	0	3+3	0	2	0
5	MF	(Jamaica) Jon Russell	6+1	0	0	0	1	0	7+1	0	1	0
16	DF	(England) Kaine Kesler-Hayden	9+5	1	1	0	0	0	10+5	1	0	0

== Awards ==
=== Huddersfield Town Blue & White Player of the Month Award ===
Awarded monthly to the player that was chosen by members of the Blue & White Members voting on htafc.com

Month	Player	Votes
August	(England) Tino Anjorin	
September	(England) Jack Rudoni	
October	(Nigeria) David Kasumu	
November/December	(England) Lee Nicholls	
January	(Poland) Michał Helik	
February	(England) Joseph Hungbo	
March	(Poland) Michał Helik	
