= Loick Ayina =

Congolese footballer (born 2003)

- Ayina with Yeovil Town in 2026

Personal information
- Full name: Loick Denis Henry Ayina
- Date of birth: 20 April 2003 (age 23)
- Place of birth: Brazzaville, Republic of the Congo
- Height: 1.83 m (6 ft 0 in)
- Position: Defender

Team information
- Current team: Yeovil Town (on loan from Salford City)
- Number: 6

Youth career
- Troyes
- AAS Sarcelles
- 2019–2020: Huddersfield Town

Senior career*
Years	Team	Apps	(Gls)
2020–2025	Huddersfield Town	2	(0)
2021	→ Boston United (loan)	4	(0)
2023	→ Dundee United (loan)	12	(0)
2024	→ Ross County (loan)	12	(0)
2025–	Salford City	1	(0)
2026–	→ Yeovil Town (loan)	7	(0)
- * Club domestic league appearances and goals as of 22:27, 21 November 2026 (UTC)

Loick Denis Henry Ayina (born 20 April 2003) is a Congolese professional footballer who plays as a defender for Yeovil Town, on loan from EFL League Two club Salford City.

== Career ==
Born in the Republic of the Congo capital Brazzaville, he moved to Paris, France as a youngster, Ayina started his football career playing for local Parisian club Montrouge F.C. 92, before moving to Athletic Club de Boulogne-Billancourt.

=== Huddersfield Town ===
Alongside fellow Frenchman Brahima Diarra, he moved to Huddersfield Town in July 2019, and they both signed professional contracts with the club a year later.

In October 2021, Ayina joined National League North side Boston United on a one-month loan.

Ayina made his senior debut for Huddersfield Town on 7 January 2023, when he played in their 3–1 FA Cup defeat against Preston North End, where he received an early yellow card, and was substituted before half-time, for fear of a second yellow card.

On 31 January 2023, Ayina joined Dundee United on loan until the end of the 2022–23 season. He was sent off on his debut, against Kilmarnock in the Scottish Cup. Ayina would return to Huddersfield at the end of the season following United's relegation to the Scottish Championship.

On 26 January 2024, Ayina joined Scottish Premiership club Ross County on loan for the remainder of the season.

On 5 May 2025, Huddersfield announced the player would be released in June when his contract expired.

=== Salford City ===
On 27 June 2025, League Two side Salford City announced he would be signing for the club on July 1.

On 26 June 2026, Ayina joined National League club Yeovil Town on a season-long loan deal.

== Personal life ==
Born in the Republic of the Congo, Ayina was raised in France and holds Congolese, Malagasy and French citizenship.

== Career statistics ==
As of match played 21 November 2026

Appearances and goals by club, season and competition
Club	Season	League			National cup (Note: Includes FA Cup, Scottish Cup)		League cup (Note: Includes EFL Cup)		Other		Total	
Club	Season	Division	Apps	Goals	Apps	Goals	Apps	Goals	Apps	Goals	Apps	Goals
Huddersfield Town	2021–22	Championship	0	0	0	0	0	0	0	0	0	0
Huddersfield Town	2022–23	Championship	0	0	1	0	0	0	—		1	0
Huddersfield Town	2023–24	Championship	2	0	0	0	1	0	—		3	0
Huddersfield Town	2024–25	League One	0	0	0	0	0	0	0	0	0	0
Huddersfield Town	Total		2	0	1	0	1	0	0	0	4	0
Boston United (loan)	2021–22	National League North	4	0	0	0	—		1 (Note: Appearance in FA Trophy)	0	5	0
Dundee United (loan)	2022–23	Scottish Premiership	12	0	1	0	0	0	—		13	0
Ross County (loan)	2023–24	Scottish Premiership	12	0	0	0	0	0	—		12	0
Salford City	2025–26	League Two	1	0	0	0	0	0	2 (Note: Appearances in EFL Trophy)	0	3	0
Salford City	2026–27	League Two	0	0	0	0	0	0	0	0	0	0
Salford City	Total		1	0	0	0	0	0	2	0	3	0
Yeovil Town (loan)	2026–27	National League	7	0	3	0	—		2 (Note: Appearances in Somerset Premier Cup)	0	12	0
Career total			38	0	5	0	1	0	5	0	49	0
