= 2023–24 Huddersfield Town A.F.C. season =

115th season in existence of Huddersfield Town AFC

Huddersfield Town
2023–24 season
- Manager: Neil Warnock (until 20 September); Darren Moore (between 21 September - 29 January); André Breitenreiter (from 15 February)
- Stadium: Kirklees Stadium
- Championship: 23rd (relegated)
- FA Cup: Third round
- EFL Cup: First round
- Top goalscorer: League: Michał Helik (9); All: Michał Helik (9)
- Highest home attendance: 22,351 vs Leeds United, 2 March 2024 EFL Championship
- Lowest home attendance: 8,057 vs Middlesbrough, 8 August 2023, EFL Cup
- Average home league attendance: 19,418
Home colours	Away colours	Third colours

The 2023–24 season is the 115th season in the history of Huddersfield Town and their fifth consecutive season in the Championship. The club are participating in the Championship, the FA Cup and the EFL Cup.

Huddersfield were relegated to League One on 4 May 2024, after suffering a 2–0 defeat away to Ipswich Town, who earned automatic promotion with the result.

== Current squad ==
As of 21 March 2024

No.	Name	Position	Nationality	Place of birth	Date of birth (age)	Signed from	Date signed	Fee	Contract end
Goalkeepers
1	Lee Nicholls	GK	(England)	Huyton	5 October 1992 (age 34)	Milton Keynes Dons	1 July 2021	Free	30 June 2026
12	Chris Maxwell	GK	(Wales)	St Asaph	30 July 1990 (age 36)	Blackpool	21 July 2023	Free	30 June 2025
41	Giosue Bellagambi	GK	(Uganda)	(England) Croydon	8 November 2001 (age 25)	Academy	1 July 2018	Trainee	30 June 2024
Defenders
3	Josh Ruffels	LB	(England)	Oxford	23 October 1993 (age 33)	Oxford United	1 July 2021	Free	30 June 2025
4	Matty Pearson	CB	(England)	Keighley	3 August 1993 (age 33)	Luton Town	1 July 2021	Free	30 June 2024
5	Michał Helik	CB	(Poland)	Chorzów	9 September 1995 (age 31)	Barnsley	1 September 2022	Undisclosed	30 June 2025
15	Jaheim Headley	LB	(England)	Southwark	24 September 2001 (age 25)	Academy	1 July 2022	Trainee	30 June 2024
16	Tom Edwards	RB	(England)	Stafford	22 January 1999 (age 27)	Stoke City	27 July 2023	Loan	31 May 2024
17	Brodie Spencer	RB	(Northern Ireland)	Belfast	6 May 2004 (age 22)	(Northern Ireland) Cliftonville	1 July 2020	Undisclosed	30 June 2025
20	Ollie Turton	RB	(England)	Manchester	6 December 1992 (age 33)	Blackpool	1 July 2021	Free	30 June 2025
24	Radinio Balker	CB	(Netherlands)	Amsterdam	3 September 1998 (age 28)	(Netherlands) Groningen	18 January 2024	Undisclosed	30 June 2027
30	Ben Jackson	LB	(England)	Stockport	22 February 2001 (age 25)	Academy	1 July 2022	Trainee	30 June 2024
32	Tom Lees	CB	(England)	Birmingham	28 November 1990 (age 35)	Sheffield Wednesday	1 August 2021	Free	30 June 2024
33	Yuta Nakayama	CB	(Japan)	Ryūgasaki	16 February 1997 (age 29)	(Netherlands) PEC Zwolle	15 July 2022	Free	30 June 2024
38	Luke Daley	LB	(England)		30 January 2003 (age 23)	Port Vale	1 July 2019	Undisclosed	30 June 2026
Midfielders
6	Jonathan Hogg	CM	(England)	Middlesbrough	6 December 1988 (age 37)	Watford	29 July 2013	Undisclosed	30 June 2024
8	Jack Rudoni	CM	(England)	Carshalton	14 June 2001 (age 25)	AFC Wimbledon	15 July 2022	£940,000	30 June 2026
11	Brahima Diarra	CM	(Mali)	(France) Paris	5 July 2003 (age 23)	(France) Boulogne-Billancourt	1 July 2019	Undisclosed	30 June 2024
18	David Kasumu	CM	(Nigeria)	Lambeth	5 October 1999 (age 27)	Milton Keynes Dons	6 July 2022	Undisclosed	30 June 2025
21	Alex Matos	AM	(England)	Bedford	3 October 2004 (age 22)	Chelsea	4 January 2024	Loan	31 May 2024
23	Ben Wiles	CM	(England)	Rotherham	17 April 1999 (age 27)	Rotherham United	25 August 2023	Undisclosed	30 June 2026
39	Tom Iorpenda	CM	(England)	London	6 April 2005 (age 21)	Brighton & Hove Albion	1 July 2021	Free	30 June 2025
42	Michael Stone	AM	(England)		29 May 2004 (age 22)	Stoke City	1 July 2020	Free	30 June 2024
Forwards
7	Delano Burgzorg	LW	(Netherlands)	Amsterdam	7 November 1998 (age 28)	(Germany) Mainz 05	17 August 2023	Loan	31 May 2024
9	Bojan Radulović	CF	(Serbia)	(Spain) Lleida	29 December 1999 (age 26)	(Finland) HJK Helsinki	5 January 2024	Undisclosed	30 June 2027
10	Josh Koroma	CF	(England)	Southwark	8 November 1998 (age 28)	Leyton Orient	21 June 2019	Undisclosed	30 June 2025
14	Sorba Thomas	RW	(Wales)	(England) Newham	25 January 1999 (age 27)	Boreham Wood	13 January 2021	Undisclosed	30 June 2026
22	Kian Harratt	CF	(England)	Pontefract	21 June 2002 (age 24)	Barnsley	1 July 2018	Undisclosed	30 June 2024
25	Danny Ward	CF	(England)	Bradford	9 December 1990 (age 35)	(Wales) Cardiff City	17 August 2020	Free	30 June 2025
26	Pat Jones	CF	(Wales)	(England) Stockport	9 June 2003 (age 23)	(Wales) Wrexham	30 September 2019	Undisclosed	30 June 2025
43	Conor Falls	RW	(Northern Ireland)		2 January 2004 (age 22)	(Northern Ireland) Glentoran	1 July 2020	Undisclosed	30 June 2025
44	Rhys Healey	CF	(England)	Manchester	6 December 1994 (age 31)	Watford	19 January 2024	Undisclosed	30 June 2026
—N/a	Kieran Phillips	CF	(England)	Huddersfield	18 February 2000 (age 26)	Everton	13 July 2020	Free	30 June 2025
Out on Loan
19	Jordan Rhodes	CF	(Scotland)	(England) Oldham	5 February 1990 (age 36)	Sheffield Wednesday	1 July 2021	Free	30 June 2024
27	Kyle Hudlin	CF	(England)	Birmingham	15 June 2000 (age 26)	Solihull Moors	13 July 2022	Undisclosed	30 June 2026
28	Scott High	CM	(Scotland)	(England) Dewsbury	15 February 2001 (age 25)	Academy	1 July 2020	Trainee	30 June 2025
29	Connor Mahoney	RW	(England)	Blackburn	12 February 1997 (age 29)	Millwall	6 July 2022	Free	30 June 2024
31	Jacob Chapman	GK	(Australia)	Wahroonga	22 October 2000 (age 26)	(Australia) Sydney United	1 January 2019	£250,000	30 June 2024
36	Josh Austerfield	CM	(England)	Morley	2 November 2001 (age 25)	Academy	1 July 2023	Trainee	30 June 2026
37	Loick Ayina	CB	(Republic of the Congo)	Brazzaville	20 April 2003 (age 23)	(France) Sarcelles	1 July 2019	Undisclosed	30 June 2024
	Aaron Rowe	RB	(England)	Hackney	7 September 2000 (age 26)	Leyton Orient	9 February 2018	Undisclosed	30 June 2024
	Tyreece Simpson	CF	(England)	Ipswich	7 February 2002 (age 24)	Ipswich Town	1 September 2022	£580,000	30 June 2026

== Transfers ==
=== In ===
Date	Pos	Player	Transferred from	Fee	Ref
21 July 2023	GK	Chris Maxwell (WAL)	Blackpool (ENG)	Free transfer	
25 August 2023	CM	Ben Wiles (ENG)	Rotherham United (ENG)	Undisclosed	
22 November 2023	CF	Danny Isaac (ENG)	Cobham (ENG)	Undisclosed	
5 January 2024	CF	Bojan Radulović (SRB)	HJK Helsinki (FIN)	Undisclosed	
18 January 2024	CB	Radinio Balker (NED)	Groningen (NED)	Undisclosed	
19 January 2024	CF	Rhys Healey (ENG)	Watford (ENG)	Undisclosed	
2 February 2024	CF	Zak Abbott (POL)	Kotwica Kołobrzeg (POL)	Free transfer	

=== Out ===
Date	Pos	Player	Transferred to	Fee	Ref
30 June 2023	LW	Rolando Aarons (JAM)	Free agent	Released	
30 June 2023	CB	Romoney Crichlow (ENG)	Peterborough United (ENG)	Released	
30 June 2023	AM	Matty Daly (ENG)	Harrogate Town (ENG)	Released	
30 June 2023	RW	Danny Grant (IRL)	Free agent	Released	
30 June 2023	CF	Joseph Johnson (ENG)	Free agent	Released	
30 June 2023	CF	Florian Kamberi (SUI)	Free agent	Released	
30 June 2023	DM	Ernaldo Krasniqi (ALB)	Free agent	Released	
30 June 2023	CM	Donay O'Brien-Brady (ENG)	Free agent	Released	
30 June 2023	CB	Michael Parker (ENG)	Shrewsbury Town (ENG)	Released	
30 June 2023	GK	Michael Roxburgh (ENG)	Free agent	Released	
30 June 2023	AM	Hakeem Sandah (ENG)	Free agent	Released	
30 June 2023	CF	Tyree Sanusi (ENG)	Free agent	Released	
30 June 2023	GK	Ryan Schofield (ENG)	Portsmouth (ENG)	Released	
30 June 2023	GK	Sam Taylor (ENG)	Free agent	Released	
30 June 2023	CB	Ajay Weston (ENG)	Free agent	Released	
30 June 2023	CM	Sonny Whittingham (ENG)	Free agent	Released	
30 June 2023	GK	Tomáš Vaclík (CZE)	New England Revolution (USA)	Released	
12 July 2023	AM	Duane Holmes (USA)	Preston North End (ENG)	Undisclosed	
13 July 2023	CB	Will Boyle (ENG)	Wrexham (WAL)	Undisclosed	
17 July 2023	DM	Etienne Camara (FRA)	Udinese (ITA)	Undisclosed	
21 July 2023	GK	Nicholas Bilokapic (AUS)	Peterborough United (ENG)	Undisclosed	
19 January 2024	CB	Rarmani Edmonds-Green (ENG)	Charlton Athletic (ENG)	Undisclosed	

=== Loaned in ===
Date	Pos	Player	Loaned from	Until	Ref
27 July 2023	RB	Tom Edwards (ENG)	Stoke City (ENG)	End of season	
17 August 2023	LW	Delano Burgzorg (NED)	Mainz 05 (GER)	End of season	
4 January 2024	AM	Alex Matos (ENG)	Chelsea (ENG)	End of season	

=== Loaned out ===
Date	Pos	Player	Loaned to	Until	Ref
26 July 2023	CF	Tyreece Simpson (ENG)	Northampton Town (ENG)	End of season	
24 August 2023	CF	Kieran Phillips (ENG)	Shrewsbury Town (ENG)	31 January 2024 (Note: On 31 January, Phillips returned early from his loan spell at Shrewsbury Town due to injury.)	
24 August 2023	RB	Brodie Spencer (NIR)	Motherwell (SCO)	3 January 2024 (Note: On 3 January, Spencer was recalled from his season-long loan at Motherwell.)	
25 August 2023	RW	Connor Mahoney (ENG)	Gillingham (ENG)	End of season	
25 August 2023	CF	Jordan Rhodes (SCO)	Blackpool (ENG)	End of season	
30 August 2023	RB	Aaron Rowe (ENG)	Crewe Alexandra (ENG)	End of season	
1 September 2023	GK	Michael Acquah (ENG)	Farsley Celtic (ENG)	29 September 2023	
1 September 2023	CM	Scott High (SCO)	Ross County (SCO)	8 January 2024 (Note: On 8 January, High returned early from his loan spell at Ross County due to injury.)	
20 October 2023	GK	Michael Acquah (ENG)	Farsley Celtic (ENG)	16 November 2023	
24 October 2023	CB	Mustapha Olagunju (ENG)	Ebbsfleet United (ENG)	28 January 2024	
24 November 2023	LB	Luke Daley (ENG)	York City (ENG)	2 January 2024	
18 January 2024	CM	Josh Austerfield (ENG)	Crewe Alexandra (ENG)	End of season	
25 January 2024	CB	Loick Ayina (FRA)	Ross County (SCO)	End of season	
31 January 2024	CF	Kyle Hudlin (ENG)	Burton Albion (ENG)	End of season	
1 February 2024	CB	Mustapha Olagunju (ENG)	Crawley Town (ENG)	End of season	
4 February 2024	CM	Scott High (SCO)	Dundalk (IRL)	End of season	
21 March 2024	GK	Jacob Chapman (AUS)	Rochdale (ENG)	End of season	
12 April 2024	CF	Kieran Phillips (ENG)	Sacramento Republic (USA)	End of season	

== Pre-season and friendlies ==
On 2 June, Huddersfield Town announced their first pre-season friendly, against Stockport County. Four further friendlies were later added, against Bodmin Town, Tavistock, Liskeard Athletic and Heerenveen.

Win Draw Loss Fixtures

10 July 2023 Friendly	Bodmin Town	0–9	Huddersfield Town	Bodmin
19:00 BST		Report	Koroma 8', 33'; Simpson 13'; Ruffels 27'; Harratt 52', 75'; Hudlin 76'; Jones 77', 87'	Stadium: Priory Park

12 July 2023 Friendly	Tavistock	0–0	Huddersfield Town	Tavistock
19:00 BST		Report		Stadium: Langsford Park

15 July 2023 Friendly	Liskeard Athletic	1–13	Huddersfield Town	Liskeard
13:00 BST	Gilbert 25'	Report	Ward 7'; Koroma 23', 49'; Rudoni 28', 66'; Headley 45'; Harratt 57', 59', 70'; Thomas 63', 80'; Simpson 74'; Jackson 75'	Stadium: Lux Park

22 July 2023 Friendly	Stockport County	0–4	Huddersfield Town	Stockport
15:00 BST		Report	Ward 4'; Koroma 33'; Rudoni 62'; Hudlin 78'	Stadium: Edgeley Park

29 July 2023 Friendly	Huddersfield Town	1–0	Heerenveen	Huddersfield
15:00 BST	Hudlin 74'	Report		Stadium: Kirklees Stadium

== Competitions ==
=== Overall record ===
Competition	First match	Last match	Starting round	Final position	Record							
Competition	First match	Last match	Starting round	Final position	Pld	W	D	L	GF	GA	GD	Win %
Championship	5 August 2023		Matchday 1		40	8	16	16	44	65	−21	20.00
FA Cup	7 January 2024	7 January 2024	First round	First round	1	0	0	1	0	5	−5	0.00
EFL Cup	8 August 2023	8 August 2023	First round	First round	1	0	0	1	2	3	−1	0.00
Total					42	8	16	18	46	73	−27	19.05

Last updated: 2 April 2024
Source: Soccerway

=== Championship ===
==== League table ====
Pos	Team	Pld	W	D	L	GF	GA	GD	Pts	Promotion, qualification or relegation
19	Blackburn Rovers	46	14	11	21	60	74	−14	53	
20	Sheffield Wednesday	46	15	8	23	44	68	−24	53	
21	Plymouth Argyle	46	13	12	21	59	70	−11	51	
22	Birmingham City (R)	46	13	11	22	50	65	−15	50	Relegated to EFL League One
23	Huddersfield Town (R)	46	9	18	19	48	77	−29	45	Relegated to EFL League One
24	Rotherham United (R)	46	5	12	29	37	89	−52	27	Relegated to EFL League One

Source: EFL official website
Rules for classification: 1) Points; 2) Goal difference; 3) Number of goals scored; 4) Head-to-head results; 5) Wins; 6) Away goals; 7) Penalty points (sec 9.5); 8) Number of 12-point sending off offences; 9) Play-off (only if needed to determine promotion/relegation)
(R) Relegated

==== Results summary ====
Overall								Home						Away					
Pld	W	D	L	GF	GA	GD	Pts	W	D	L	GF	GA	GD	W	D	L	GF	GA	GD
46	9	18	19	46	69	−23	45	6	8	9	25	31	−6	3	10	10	21	38	−17

Last updated: 9 April 2024.
Source: Soccerway

==== Results by round ====
Round	1	2	3	4	5	6	7	8	9	10	11	12	13	14	15	16	17	18	19	20	21	22	23	24	25	26	27	28	29	30	31	32	33	34	35	36	37	38	39	40	41	42	43	44	45	46
Ground	A	H	A	H	A	H	H	A	H	A	A	H	H	A	H	A	H	A	A	H	H	A	A	H	H	A	H	A	A	H	A	H	H	A	H	A	H	A	H	A	H	A	A	H	H	A
Result	L	L	D	L	W	W	D	D	D	L	D	W	L	L	D	L	D	W	D	D	L	D	L	W	L	L	D	D	D	W	L	W	L	W	D	L	L	D	L	D	W	L	D	L	D	L
Position	22	23	21	23	21	17	16	17	17	19	19	18	21	21	21	21	21	21	21	21	21	21	21	21	21	21	21	21	21	21	21	20	20	19	21	21	22	22	22	22	21	21	22	23	23	23

Updated to match(es) played on 9 April 2024. Source: Soccerway
A = Away; H = Home; W = Win; D = Draw; L = Loss

==== Matches ====
On 22 June, the EFL Championship fixtures were released.

Win Draw Loss Fixtures

5 August 2023 1	Plymouth Argyle	3–1	Huddersfield Town	Plymouth
15:00 BST	Whittaker 6'; Mumba 73'; Hardie 76'; Edwards (yellow card) 88'	Report	Helik 45+6'	Stadium: Home Park; Attendance: 16,446; Referee: Matt Donohue

12 August 2023 2	Huddersfield Town	0–1	Leicester City	Huddersfield
15:00 BST	Pearson (yellow card) 54'	Report	Dewsbury-Hall (yellow card) 16'; Vestergaard (yellow card) 23'; Pereira (yellow card) 48'; Mavididi 73'; Winks (yellow card) 90+2'	Stadium: Kirklees Stadium; Attendance: 19,541; Referee: David Webb

19 August 2023 3	Middlesbrough	1–1	Huddersfield Town	Middlesbrough
15:00 BST	Hackney 61'; Howson (yellow card) 90+5'	Report	Hogg (yellow card) 5'; Rudoni (yellow card) 45+1'; Fry 47' (o.g.); Burgzorg (yellow card) 87'	Stadium: Riverside Stadium; Attendance: 26,257; Referee: Josh Smith

26 August 2023 4	Huddersfield Town	0–4	Norwich City	Huddersfield
15:00 BST	Thomas (yellow card) 22'; Koroma (yellow card) 28'; Hogg (yellow card) 61'	Report	Sargent 11'; Barnes 17' (pen.); Duffy (yellow card) 37'; Rowe 48'; Idah 84'	Stadium: Kirklees Stadium; Attendance: 18,708; Referee: Dean Whitestone

2 September 2023 5	West Bromwich Albion	1–2	Huddersfield Town	West Bromwich
15:00 BST	Swift 52' (yellow card) 90+9'	Report	Burgzorg 33'; Ruffels (yellow card) 41'; Rudoni 90+6'	Stadium: The Hawthorns; Attendance: 23,094; Referee: James Linington

16 September 2023 6	Huddersfield Town	2–0	Rotherham United	Huddersfield
15:00 BST	Koroma 18'; Thomas 70'; Diarra (yellow card) 88'	Report	Humphreys (yellow card) 65'	Stadium: Kirklees Stadium; Attendance: 19,050; Referee: Jeremy Simpson

20 September 2023 7	Huddersfield Town	2–2	Stoke City	Huddersfield
19:45 BST	Pearson 31'; Rudoni 68' (yellow card) 77'; Edmonds-Green (yellow card) 81'	Report	Johnson 33'; Wilmot 62'; Burger (yellow card) 72'; Pearson (yellow card) 77'	Stadium: Kirklees Stadium; Attendance: 18,791; Referee: Darren Bond

25 September 2023 8	Coventry City	1–1	Huddersfield Town	Coventry
20:00 BST	Ayari 27'; Dasilva (yellow card) 41'; Binks (yellow card) 82'	Report	Koroma (yellow card) 66'; Helik (yellow card) 79', (goal) 90+5'; Rudoni (yellow card) 85'	Stadium: Coventry Arena; Attendance: 22,257; Referee: Oliver Langford

30 September 2023 9	Huddersfield Town	1–1	Ipswich Town	Huddersfield
15:00 BST	Nakayama (yellow card) 5'; Thomas (yellow card) 35'; Burgzorg 61' (yellow card) 61'	Report	Burgess (yellow card) 20'; Burns (yellow card) 35'; Davis (yellow card) 52'; Williams 87'	Stadium: Kirklees Stadium; Referee: Geoff Eltringham

3 October 2023 10	Birmingham City	4–1	Huddersfield Town	Birmingham
19:45 BST	Dembélé 3', 64'; Miyoshi 23'; Stansfield (yellow card) 34'; Bacuna (yellow card) 58'; Long (yellow card) 74'; James 90+5'	Report	Pearson (yellow card) 55'; Helik 90+2'	Stadium: St. Andrew's; Attendance: 15,944; Referee: Sam Allison

7 October 2023 11	Sheffield Wednesday	0–0	Huddersfield Town	Owlerton
15:00 BST	Vaulks (yellow card) 58'	Report	Hogg (yellow card) 90+6'	Stadium: Hillsborough Stadium; Attendance: 26,025; Referee: Matt Donohue

21 October 2023 12	Huddersfield Town	2–1	Queens Park Rangers	Huddersfield
15:00 BST	Harratt 8'; Rudoni 14'; Burgzorg (yellow card) 47'; Nakayama (yellow card) 85'	Report	Chair (yellow card) 34'; Clarke-Salter 42'; Colback (yellow card) 45+4'	Stadium: Kirklees Stadium; Attendance: 18,010; Referee: Gavin Ward

24 October 2023 13	Huddersfield Town	0–4	Cardiff City	Huddersfield
19:45 BST	Helik (yellow card) 45+3'	Report	Robinson 2'; Goutas 12'; Méïté 42'; Ng 55'; Siopis (yellow card) 64'; Adams (yellow card) 87'; Collins (yellow card) 90+5'	Stadium: Kirklees Stadium; Attendance: 16,780; Referee: Anthony Backhouse

28 October 2023 14	Leeds United	4–1	Huddersfield Town	Leeds
12:30 BST	James 20', 34'; Summerville 31', 45+4'	Report	Hogg (yellow card) 24'; Thomas (yellow card) 37'; Diarra (yellow card) 40'; Lees (yellow card) 50'; Helik 70'	Stadium: Elland Road; Attendance: 36,813; Referee: James Bell

4 November 2023 15	Huddersfield Town	0–0	Watford	Huddersfield
15:00 GMT		Report	Livermore (yellow card) 57'; Chakvetadze (yellow card) 67'	Stadium: Kirklees Stadium; Attendance: 18,225; Referee: Sunny Gill

11 November 2023 16	Hull City	1–0	Huddersfield Town	Kingston upon Hull
15:00 GMT	Tufan (yellow card) 75'; Delap 90+2'; Docherty (yellow card) 90+4'	Report	Thomas (yellow card) 20'; Edmonds-Green (yellow card) 22'; Nicholls (yellow card) 63'	Stadium: MKM Stadium; Attendance: 20,630; Referee: Matt Donohue

25 November 2023 17	Huddersfield Town	1–1	Southampton	Huddersfield
15:00 GMT	Kasumu (yellow card) 38'; Headley (yellow card) 41'; Lees (yellow card) 70'; Jackson 87' (yellow card) 88'	Report	Armstrong 45+1'; Kamaldeen (yellow card) 50'	Stadium: Kirklees Stadium; Attendance: 19,387; Referee: David Webb

29 November 2023 18	Sunderland	1–2	Huddersfield Town	Sunderland
19:45 GMT	Aouchiche (yellow card) 31'; O'Nien 40'; Clarke (yellow card) 90+5'	Report	Helik 28'; Lees (yellow card) 39'; Burgzorg 67'	Stadium: Stadium of Light; Attendance: 37,728; Referee: Matt Donohue

2 December 2023 19	Swansea City	1–1	Huddersfield Town	Landore
15:00 GMT	Walsh (yellow card) 44'; Patino 90+4'	Report	Cabango 3' (o.g.); Thomas (yellow card) 86'; Kasumu (yellow card) 90+7'	Stadium: Swansea.com Stadium; Attendance: 14,725; Referee: Steve Martin

9 December 2023 20	Huddersfield Town	1–1	Bristol City	Huddersfield
15:00 GMT	Burgzorg 24'; Pearson (yellow card) 80'	Report	Conway 46' (yellow card) 82'	Stadium: Kirklees Stadium; Attendance: 17,429; Referee: Andy Davies

12 December 2023 21	Huddersfield Town	1–3	Preston North End	Huddersfield
19:45 GMT	Ward 54'	Report	Browne 3'; Lindsay (yellow card) 19'; Keane 39'; Potts (yellow card) 45+2'; Whiteman 66'	Stadium: Kirklees Stadium; Attendance: 17,549; Referee: John Busby

16 December 2023 22	Millwall	1–1	Huddersfield Town	Bermondsey
15:00 GMT	Norton-Cuffy 57'	Report	Hogg (yellow card) 45+1'; Rudoni (yellow card) 71'; Burgzorg 90+7' (pen.)	Stadium: The Den; Attendance: 15,040; Referee: Darren Bond

23 December 2023 23	Norwich City	2–0	Huddersfield Town	Norwich
15:00 GMT	McCallum 47'; Duffy (yellow card) 68'; Sainz 73'	Report	Rudoni (yellow card) 45+2'	Stadium: Carrow Road; Attendance: 26,067; Referee: Thomas Kirk

26 December 2023 24	Huddersfield Town	3–0	Blackburn Rovers	Huddersfield
15:00 GMT	Headley 28'; Lees (yellow card) 49'; Thomas 55'; Burgzorg 68'	Report	Carter (yellow card) 35'; Wharton (yellow card) 51'; Brittain (yellow card) 90+1'; Travis (yellow card) 90+5'	Stadium: Kirklees Stadium; Attendance: 20,516; Referee: Darren England

29 December 2023 25	Huddersfield Town	1–2	Middlesbrough	Huddersfield
19:45 GMT	Helik 60'	Report	Rogers (yellow card) 32'; Coburn 54'; Bangura (yellow card) 69'; Howson (penalty missed) 84', 84'	Stadium: Kirklees Stadium; Attendance: 20,045; Referee: Ben Toner

1 January 2024 26	Leicester City	4–1	Huddersfield Town	Leicester
15:00 GMT	Cannon 40', 61'; Pereira 47'; Mavididi 77'	Report	Helik 63'; Ayina (yellow card) 76'	Stadium: King Power Stadium; Attendance: 30,407; Referee: Sam Allison

13 January 2024 27	Huddersfield Town	1–1	Plymouth Argyle	Huddersfield
15:00 GMT	Koroma 38'; Thomas (yellow card) 50'	Report	Whittaker 12'; Wright (yellow card) 26'; Hazard (yellow card) 62'; Phillips (yellow card) 64'; Randell (yellow card) 75'	Stadium: Kirklees Stadium; Attendance: 20,253; Referee: Tom Nield

20 January 2024 28	Blackburn Rovers	1–1	Huddersfield Town	Blackburn
15:00 GMT	Wharton 7', (yellow card) 90+1'; Tronstad (yellow card) 39'	Report	Helik 23'; Hogg (yellow card) 65'; Radulović (yellow card) 90+2'	Stadium: Ewood Park; Attendance: 14,529; Referee: James Linington

28 January 2024 29	Queens Park Rangers	1–1	Huddersfield Town	Shepherd's Bush
13:30 GMT	Drewe (yellow card) 18'; Clarke-Salter (yellow card) 23'; Field (yellow card) 64'; Colback (yellow card) 86'; Paal 90+5'	Report	Helik (yellow card) 17'; Rudoni 86'; Spencer (yellow card) 90+2'; Radulović (yellow card) 90+3'	Stadium: Loftus Road; Attendance: 16,483; Referee: Stephen Martin
Note: Fixture was originally scheduled for 27 January, but was moved due to live Sky Sports coverage.

3 February 2024 30	Huddersfield Town	4–0	Sheffield Wednesday	Huddersfield
15:00 GMT	Balker (yellow card) 18'; Spencer (yellow card) 47'; Pearson 68'; Koroma 70', 80'; Thomas 76'; Matos (yellow card) 79'	Report	Pedersen (yellow card) 34'	Stadium: Kirklees Stadium; Attendance: 21,067; Referee: Matt Donohue

10 February 2024 31	Southampton	5–3	Huddersfield Town	Southampton
15:00 GMT	Bednarek (yellow card) 23'; Manning (yellow card) 46'; Rothwell 49', 50'; Lees 80' (o.g.); Mara 84'; Edozie 90+1'	Report	Spencer (yellow card) 21'; Thomas 36'; Rudoni (yellow card) 39'; Kasumu 45'; Matos 65'; Jackson (yellow card) 74'	Stadium: St Mary's Stadium; Attendance: 29,863; Referee: David Webb

14 February 2024 32	Huddersfield Town	1–0	Sunderland	Huddersfield
19:45 GMT	Pearson 37'; Matos (yellow card) 68'; Nicholls (yellow card) 80'	Report	O'Nien (yellow card) 35'; Ba (yellow card) 50'; Mundle (yellow card) 86'; Patterson (yellow card) 90+6'	Stadium: Kirklees Stadium; Attendance: 19,550; Referee: Gavin Ward

17 February 2024 33	Huddersfield Town	1–2	Hull City	Huddersfield
15:00 GMT	Rudoni (yellow card) 14', (goal) 90+2'; Spencer (yellow card) 30'; Thomas (yellow card) 45+2'	Report	Greaves 7', 90+4'; Philogene (yellow card) 24'	Stadium: Kirklees Stadium; Attendance: 19,947; Referee: Rebecca Welch

24 February 2024 34	Watford	1–2	Huddersfield Town	Watford
15:00 GMT	Kayembe (yellow card) 14'; Dennis 55'; Ince (yellow card) 57'	Report	Ward 70', 83'; Kasumu (yellow card) 73'; Spencer (yellow card) 81'	Stadium: Vicarage Road; Attendance: 18,970; Referee: Ben Toner

2 March 2024 35	Huddersfield Town	1–1	Leeds United	Huddersfield
12:30 GMT	Hogg (yellow card) 20' (yellow-red card) 45+4'; Kasumu (yellow card) 38'; Pearson (yellow card) 39'; Helik 45+1'	Report	Rutter (yellow card) 63'; Bamford 67'	Stadium: Kirklees Stadium; Attendance: 22,351; Referee: Andrew Kitchen
Note: Kick-off was originally 15:00, but was brought forward for live Sky Sports coverage.

6 March 2024 36	Cardiff City	1–0	Huddersfield Town	Leckwith
19:45 GMT	Wintle (yellow card) 27'; Diédhiou 30'; Grant (yellow card) 59'; Ng (yellow card) 66'; Tanner (yellow card) 83'	Report	Spencer (yellow card) 19'	Stadium: Cardiff City Stadium; Attendance: 17,243; Referee: Matt Donohue

10 March 2024 37	Huddersfield Town	1–4	West Bromwich Albion	Huddersfield
12:00 GMT	Burgzorg 30', (yellow card) 31'	Report	Johnston 51', 73'; Bartley 60'; Yokuslu 66'; Mowatt (yellow card) 87'	Stadium: Kirklees Stadium; Attendance: 19,383; Referee: David Webb
Note: Fixture was originally scheduled for 9 March, but was moved for live Sky Sports coverage.

16 March 2024 38	Rotherham United	0–0	Huddersfield Town	Rotherham
15:00 GMT	Rathbone (yellow card) 68'; Revan (yellow card) 74'	Report	Spencer (yellow card) 26'; Kasumu (yellow card) 36'; Thomas (yellow card) 54' (yellow-red card) 58'	Stadium: New York Stadium; Attendance: 11,033; Referee: Josh Smith

29 March 2024 39	Huddersfield Town	1–3	Coventry City	Huddersfield
15:00 GMT	Balker (yellow card) 14'; Healey 79'	Report	Kitching (yellow card) 3'; Simms 16', 22'; Sheaf (yellow card) 45'; Thomas (yellow card) 87'; Collins (yellow card) 88'; Wright 90+4'	Stadium: Kirklees Stadium; Attendance: 20,530; Referee: Adam Herczeg

1 April 2024 40	Stoke City	1–1	Huddersfield Town	Stoke-on-Trent
15:00 GMT	Léris (yellow card) 31'; Hoever 50'; McNally (yellow card) 52'; Hakšabanović (yellow card) 66'	Report	Matos (yellow card) 40'; Radulović 45'	Stadium: Bet365 Stadium; Attendance: 23,917; Referee: Rebecca Welch

6 April 2024 41	Huddersfield Town	1–0	Millwall	Huddersfield
15:00 GMT	Jackson (yellow card) 35'; Thomas (yellow card) 61'; Edwards (yellow card) 90+2'; Healey 90+4'; Nicholls (yellow card) 90+7'	Report	Leonard (yellow card) 41'; Saville (yellow card) 59'; Mitchell (yellow card) 61'; McNamara (yellow card) 90+2'	Stadium: Kirklees Stadium; Attendance: 18,569; Referee: James Linington

9 April 2024 42	Preston North End	4–1	Huddersfield Town	Preston
19:45 BST	Holmes (yellow card) 21'; McCann (yellow card) 24'; Keane 53' (pen.); Cunningham (yellow card) 72'; Osmajić 84', 87', 90+2'	Report	Kasumu (yellow card) 25'; Koroma 42'; Matos (yellow card) 52'	Stadium: Deepdale; Attendance: 14,698; Referee: Lewis Smith

13 April 2024 43	Bristol City	1–1	Huddersfield Town	Bristol
15:00 BST				Stadium: Ashton Gate

20 April 2024 44	Huddersfield Town	0–4	Swansea City	Huddersfield
15:00 BST				Stadium: Kirklees Stadium

27 April 2024 45	Huddersfield Town	1–1	Birmingham City	Huddersfield
15:00 BST				Stadium: Kirklees Stadium

4 May 2024 46	Ipswich Town	2–0	Huddersfield Town	Ipswich
15:00 BST				Stadium: Portman Road

=== FA Cup ===
As a Championship team, Huddersfield entered the FA Cup at the third round stage and were drawn away to Manchester City.

Win Draw Loss Fixtures

7 January 2024 Third round	Manchester City	5–0	Huddersfield Town	Manchester
14:00 GMT	Foden 33', 65'; Álvarez 37'; Jackson 58' (o.g.); Doku 74'	Report	Matos (yellow card) 13'; Spencer (yellow card) 90+3'	Stadium: City of Manchester Stadium; Attendance: 51,939; Referee: Michael Salisbury

=== EFL Cup ===
Huddersfield were drawn against Middlesbrough at home in the first round.

Win Draw Loss Fixtures

8 August 2023 First round	Huddersfield Town	2–3	Middlesbrough	Huddersfield
19:00 BST	Harratt 4'; Headley (red card) 13'; Hudlin 90+4'; Ayina (yellow card) 90+5'	Report	Payero (yellow card) 19'; Silvera 20'; Jones 63'; McGree 82'; Crooks (yellow card) 90+6'	Stadium: Kirklees Stadium; Attendance: 8,057; Referee: Oliver Langford
