= Brodie Spencer =

Northern Irish footballer (born 2004)

Personal information
- Full name: Brodie Gilmore Spencer
- Date of birth: 6 May 2004 (age 22)
- Place of birth: Belfast, Northern Ireland
- Height: 1.82 m (5 ft 11 1/2 in)
- Position: Defender

Team information
- Current team: Oxford United
- Number: 15

Youth career
- –2020: Cliftonville
- 2020–2025: Huddersfield Town

Senior career*
Years	Team	Apps	(Gls)
2022–2025	Huddersfield Town	57	(3)
2023–2024	→ Motherwell (loan)	18	(0)
2025–	Oxford United	28	(1)

International career^{‡}
2019	Northern Ireland U16	4	(1)
2021–	Northern Ireland U19	8	(0)
2022–	Northern Ireland	29	(0)
- * Club domestic league appearances and goals as of 25 April 2026 (UTC) ‡ National team caps and goals as of 18 November 2026 (UTC)

Brodie Spencer (born 6 May 2004) is a Northern Irish professional footballer who plays as a full-back, centre-back or wing-back for EFL League One club Oxford United and the Northern Ireland national team.

== Club career ==
Spencer signed for Huddersfield Town in 2020 from Cliftonville, joining their B Team. He made his debut for Town in their EFL Cup match against Preston North End on 9 August 2022, and would make his league debut in their 2–0 defeat against Sunderland on 2 November 2022.

On 24 August 2023, Spencer signed a new two-year contract extension and subsequently joined Scottish Premiership club Motherwell on a season-long loan deal. Having impressed during the first-half of the season, Spencer was recalled from his loan on 3 January 2024.

On 10 July 2025, Spencer joined EFL Championship club Oxford United on a permanent deal.

== International career ==
Brodie Spencer made his international debut for Northern Ireland on 5 June 2022 in a 2022–23 UEFA Nations League match against Kosovo, where he provided an assist for Northern Ireland's first goal, but they still lost 3–2.

== Career statistics ==
=== Club ===
As of match played 21 February 2026

Appearances and goals by club, season and competition
Club	Season	League			FA Cup		League Cup		Other		Total	
Club	Season	Division	Apps	Goal	Apps	Goal	Apps	Goal	Apps	Goal	Apps	Goal
Huddersfield Town	2022–23	Championship	4	0	0	0	1	0	—		5	0
Huddersfield Town	2023–24	Championship	20	0	1	0	1	0	—		22	0
Huddersfield Town	2024–25	League One	15	2	0	0	1	0	1	0	17	2
Huddersfield Town	Total		39	2	1	0	3	0	1	0	44	2
Motherwell (loan)	2023–24	Scottish Premiership	18	0	0	0	0	0	0	0	18	0
Oxford United	2025–26	Championship	19	0	1	0	2	0	—		22	0
Career total			76	2	2	0	5	0	1	0	84	2

=== International ===
As of match played 17 November 2026

Appearances and goals by national team and year
National team	Year	Apps	Goals
Northern Ireland	2022	3	0
Northern Ireland	2023	2	0
Northern Ireland	2024	8	0
Northern Ireland	2025	6	0
Northern Ireland	2026	10	0
Total		29	0
