= Pat Jones (footballer, born 2003) =

Welsh footballer

Personal information
- Full name: Patrick Samuel Jones
- Date of birth: 9 June 2003 (age 23)
- Place of birth: Stockport, England
- Height: 1.80 m (5 ft 11 in)
- Position: Winger

Team information
- Current team: Scunthorpe United
- Number: 14

Youth career
- Ruthin Town
- Bala Town
- 2017–2019: Wrexham
- 2019–2020: Huddersfield Town

Senior career*
Years	Team	Apps	(Gls)
2020–2024	Huddersfield Town	15	(1)
2024–2025	Exeter City	17	(0)
2025–2026	Chester	33	(8)
2026–	Scunthorpe United	26	(2)

International career^{‡}
2019	Wales U17	5	(0)
2022–2024	Wales U21	7	(0)
- * Club domestic league appearances and goals as of 09:58, 11 March 2026 (UTC) ‡ National team caps and goals as of 18:44 10 March 2026 (UTC)

Patrick Samuel Jones (born 9 June 2003) is a professional footballer who plays as a winger for National League side Scunthorpe United. He is a former Wales under-21 international.

== Club career ==
Born in Stockport, England, Jones started his football career at his local team Ruthin Town, before moving to Bala Town and then Wrexham in 2017.

=== Huddersfield Town ===
He joined the Huddersfield Town Academy in September 2019, before signing a professional contract in October 2020. Because the transfer was across the England–Wales border, Jones had to wait for international clearance before joining the club, which came in January 2020.

Jones made his senior debut for Huddersfield Town on 9 January 2021, starting in their 3–2 FA Cup Third Round defeat to Plymouth Argyle, before being replaced by Rolando Aarons.

He scored his first goal for Huddersfield against Norwich City on 16 August 2022.

=== Exeter City ===
On 30 August 2024, Jones was signed by Exeter City on a one-year deal, with a club option of a second year, for an undisclosed fee.

=== Chester ===
On 19 August 2025, Jones signed for Chester on a deal until the end of the season. He scored his first two league goals for Chester in a draw against AFC Fylde on 2nd September 2025.

=== Scunthorpe United ===
On 10 March 2026, Jones joined National League side Scunthorpe United for an undisclosed fee, signing a two-year deal. he made his debut later that day, coming off the bench at half time in a 2–1 loss to Sutton United.

== International career ==
Jones has played for Wales' Under-17 side.

In June 2022, Jones played twice for the Wales U21 team in UEFA European Under-21 Championship qualification matches against Netherlands U21 and Gibraltar U21.

== Career statistics ==
As of match played 19 August 2025

Appearances and goals by club, season and competition
Club	Season	League			FA Cup		League Cup		Other		Total	
Club	Season	Division	Apps	Goals	Apps	Goals	Apps	Goals	Apps	Goals	Apps	Goals
Huddersfield Town	2020–21	EFL Championship	2	0	1	0	0	0	0	0	3	0
Huddersfield Town	2021–22	EFL Championship	0	0	0	0	0	0	0	0	0	0
Huddersfield Town	2022–23	EFL Championship	6	1	0	0	0	0	0	0	6	1
Huddersfield Town	2023–24	EFL Championship	7	0	0	0	1	0	0	0	8	0
Huddersfield Town	2024–25	EFL League One	0	0	0	0	1	0	0	0	1	0
Huddersfield Town	Total		15	1	1	0	2	0	0	0	18	1
Exeter City	2024–25	EFL League One	17	0	2	0	0	0	0	0	19	0
Chester	2025-26	National League North	33	7	5	1	0	0	1	0	39	8
Scunthorpe United	2025- 26	National League	12	1	0	0	0	0	0	0	12	1
Scunthorpe United	2026-27	National League	14	1	2	0	1	0	0	0	17	1
Career total			91	10	10	1	3	0	1	0	105	11
