= Jordan Rhodes =

English-Scottish footballer (born 1990)

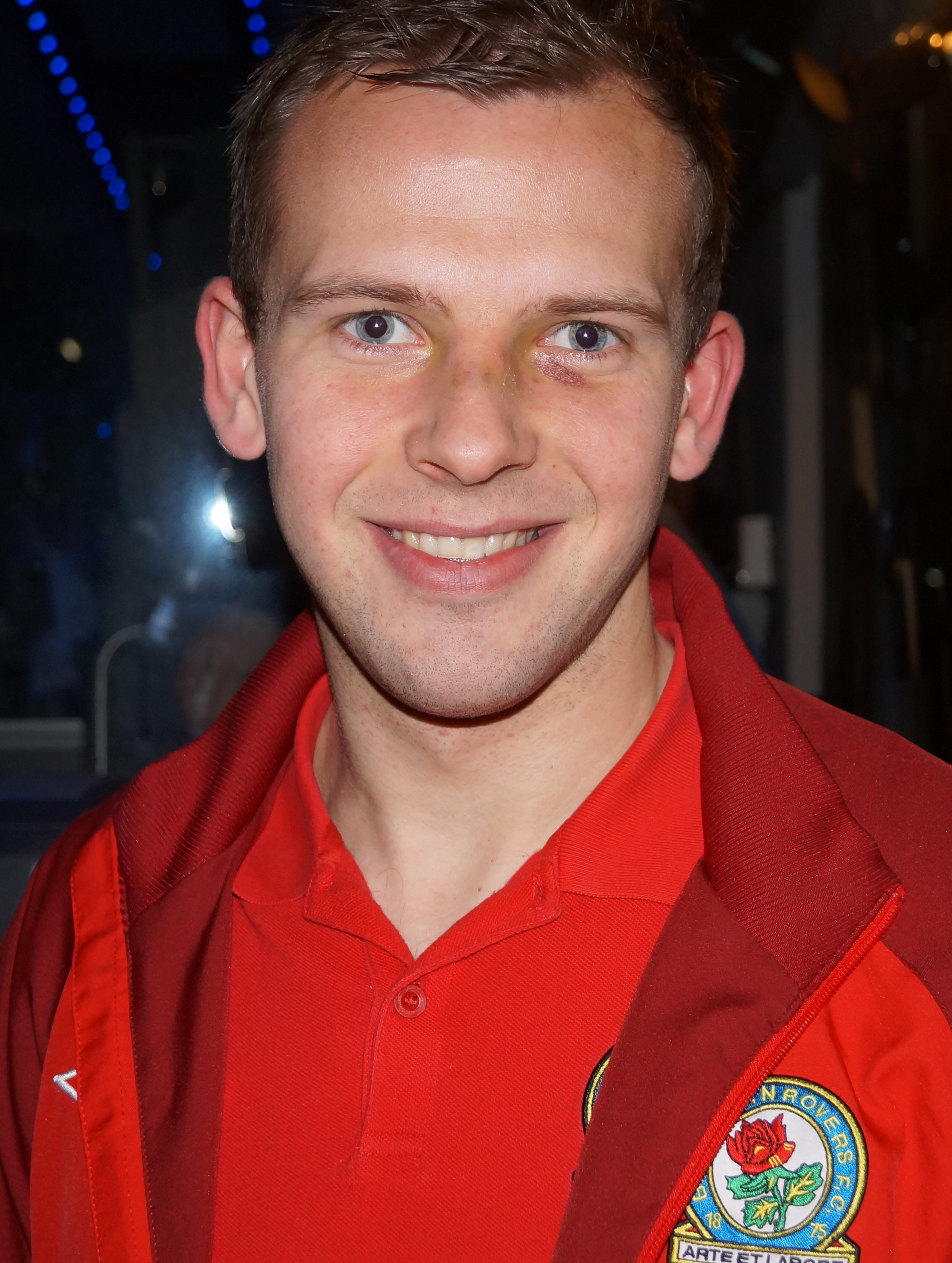
- Rhodes in 2013

Personal information
- Full name: Jordan Luke Rhodes
- Date of birth: 5 February 1990 (age 36)
- Place of birth: Oldham, England
- Height: 6 ft 1 in (1.85 m)
- Position: Striker

Team information
- Current team: Blackburn Rovers (Loans Manager)

Youth career
- 2003–2005: Barnsley
- 2005–2007: Ipswich Town

Senior career*
Years	Team	Apps	(Gls)
2007–2009	Ipswich Town	10	(1)
2007	→ Oxford United (loan)	4	(0)
2008	→ Rochdale (loan)	5	(2)
2009	→ Brentford (loan)	14	(7)
2009–2012	Huddersfield Town	124	(73)
2012–2016	Blackburn Rovers	159	(83)
2016–2017	Middlesbrough	24	(6)
2017	→ Sheffield Wednesday (loan)	18	(3)
2017–2021	Sheffield Wednesday	83	(15)
2018–2019	→ Norwich City (loan)	36	(6)
2021–2024	Huddersfield Town	55	(8)
2023–2024	→ Blackpool (loan)	29	(15)
2024–2025	Blackpool	21	(0)
2025	→ Mansfield Town (loan)	14	(1)
Total		596	(220)

International career
2011–2012	Scotland U21	8	(8)
2011–2017	Scotland	14	(3)
- * Club domestic league appearances and goals

Jordan Luke Rhodes (born 5 February 1990) is a former professional footballer who played as a striker. He is currently the loans manager at Blackburn Rovers. Born in England, he represented the Scotland national team.

He started his career at Ipswich Town and after loan spells at Oxford United, Rochdale and Brentford he joined Huddersfield Town. In the 2011–12 season, he was the top scorer in England with 36 league goals, breaking Huddersfield's club record for most league goals scored in a season.

In August 2012, he became English football's most expensive player outside the top flight when he joined Blackburn Rovers for an £8 million fee, equalling Blackburn's record transfer fee. In 2016, Rhodes joined Middlesbrough, briefly featuring in the Premier League. The following year he signed for Sheffield Wednesday. His season-long loan with Norwich City began in July 2018. After being released by Sheffield Wednesday in May 2021, he re-signed for former club Huddersfield Town.

In the summer of 2024, he moved on a free transfer to Blackpool, where he had been on loan the previous season.

Born in England, Rhodes opted to play for Scotland, for whom he had become eligible through school attendance while his father Andy Rhodes played as a goalkeeper for Scottish football clubs. Rhodes has represented Scotland at both U-21 level and as a full international.

== Early life ==
Rhodes was born in Oldham, Greater Manchester, while his father, English goalkeeper Andy Rhodes, was playing for Oldham Athletic. Rhodes senior moved to Scotland later that year, when he joined Dunfermline Athletic, and stayed in Scotland until 1998, also playing for St Johnstone and Airdrieonians.

Andy Rhodes joined Ipswich Town as a coach in 2004. Jordan Rhodes attended Kesgrave High School in Ipswich through his secondary school years where he was scouted and recruited by Ipswich Town in 2004.

== Club career ==
=== Ipswich Town ===
Rhodes joined Ipswich Town in March 2005 when his father joined the club as a goalkeeping coach. He was selected by the England under-17s team, but withdrew due to injury.

At the start of the 2006–07 season Rhodes suffered numerous injuries including a dislocated shoulder and being knocked unconscious. He signed his first professional contract in August 2007, and made his debut for Ipswich in the 2007–08 season, coming on as a late substitute against Burnley on 22 December.

On 9 April 2008, Rhodes scored his first league goal in the 73rd minute against Cardiff City and was the equalising goal in a 1–1 draw, after coming into the game as a half time substitute.

==== Loans to Oxford and Rochdale ====
He joined Oxford United in the Conference Premier on a one-month loan deal on 10 October 2007. He failed to score in his four league appearances and he was recalled from his loan spell on 6 November by Ipswich as he was required for their FA Youth Cup.

With his playing time at Ipswich being limited, Rhodes joined League Two club Rochdale on 12 September 2008 to get more first-team opportunities.

==== Loan to Brentford ====
On 23 January 2009, he joined Brentford on a one-month loan deal, and made his debut the following day in a 2–0 defeat away at Macclesfield Town in a League Two fixture. He scored his first Brentford goal on his home debut in the 3–0 win at home to Aldershot Town. Rhodes scored his first hat-trick in 29 minutes of the first half in the 3–1 away win at Shrewsbury Town on 31 January, also making him the youngest Brentford player to score a hat-trick in the club's history, five days short of his 19th birthday. On 26 February, having scored six goals in seven matches, his loan was extended for "a further two months", with the addition of a 24-hour recall clause. On 17 March, Rhodes suffered a broken metatarsal in a match against Chesterfield, ending his season. Even though Rhodes was sidelined for nearly half of March, he was named as March's PFA League Two Fans' Player of the Month.

Despite only playing for Brentford for three months, Rhodes was awarded the PFA Fans' Player of the Year accolade for League Two, in 2009.

=== Huddersfield Town ===
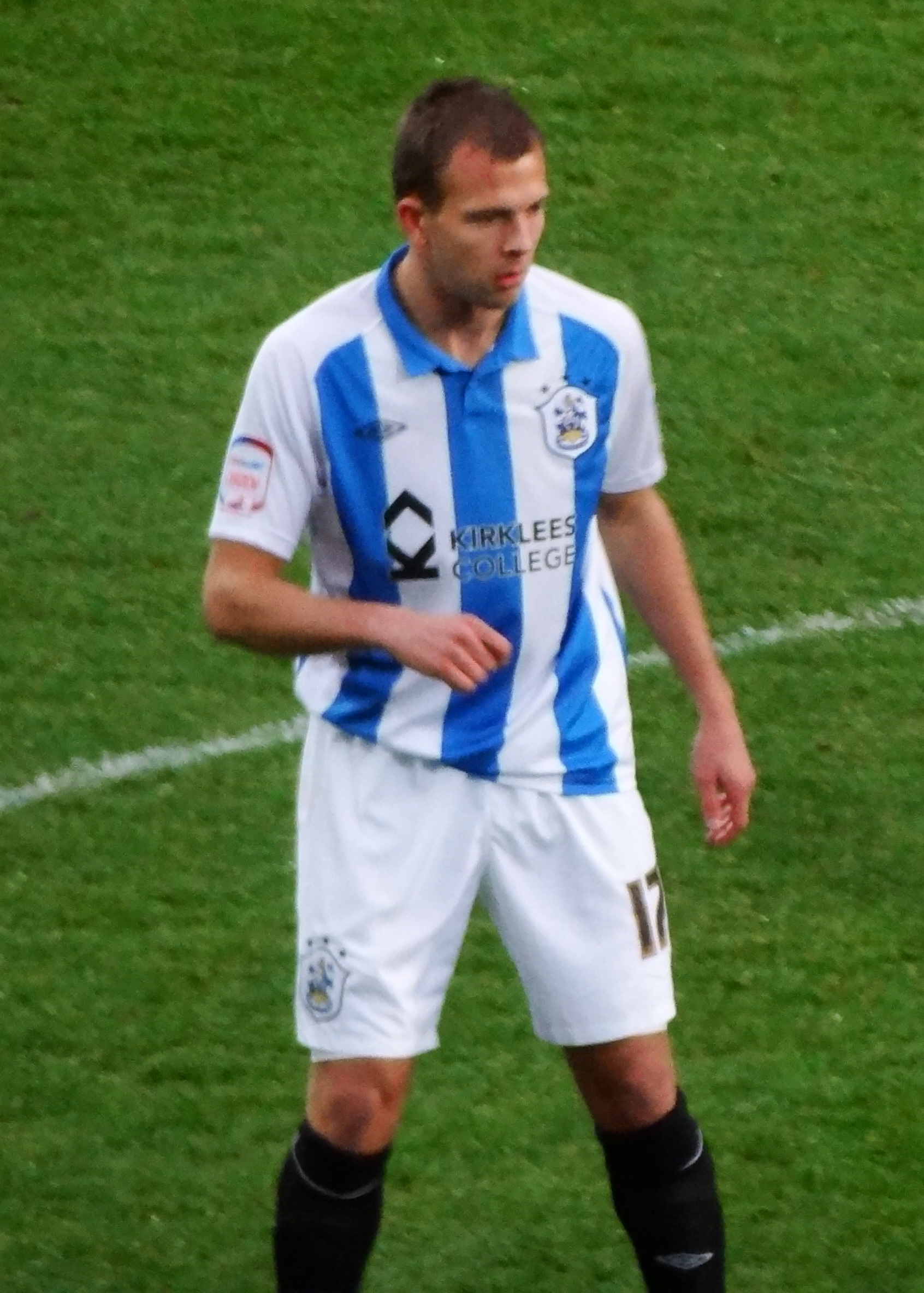
Rhodes playing for Huddersfield Town in 2011

On 31 July 2009, Rhodes signed for Huddersfield Town on a four-year contract for an undisclosed fee believed to be £350,000 plus a sell-on fee, becoming manager Lee Clark's sixth signing of the season. Rhodes started the season well scoring six goals in his first six games at the club. He made his debut coming off the bench in the 2–2 draw against Southend United at Roots Hall on 8 August 2009, where he scored Town's equaliser. He scored two goals on his home debut against Stockport County in the League Cup three days later. In his next game on 15 August he added a further two goals to his tally in a 3–1 win over Southampton. and then in Huddersfield's 4–3 away loss to Newcastle United in the League Cup second round.

On 10 October, he scored a hat-trick of headers within eight minutes in a 4–0 victory over Exeter City, which beat the previous record set by Dixie Dean in the 1930s. Rhodes finished the season as Huddersfield's top scorer with 23 goals in all competitions. He was again their top scorer in 2010–11, despite limited appearances, Rhodes scored 22 in total.

Rhodes began the 2011–12 season with 13 goals in his first 13 games in all competitions. He was also the first Huddersfield player to score back to back hat-tricks since the 1920s, the two coming against Exeter City on 15 October 2011 in a 4–0 away victory and then in the 3–1 home win over Preston North End on 22 October 2011. On 17 December, he scored all four of Huddersfield's goals in an away fixture which ended 4–4 against Sheffield Wednesday. Rhodes scored five times in a 6–0 win against Wycombe Wanderers, equalling the record for goals scored by a Huddersfield Town player in a match set by Dave Mangnall and Alf Lythgoe in the 1930s. On 11 March 2012, Rhodes was named League One Player of the Year at the Football League Awards, ahead of Charlton Athletic's Johnnie Jackson and Sheffield United's Ched Evans. On 3 April 2012, in a match against Leyton Orient, he surpassed Sam Taylor and George Brown's jointly held goalscoring record for the club with his 36th league goal of the season, as part of his sixth hat-trick of the season. Rhodes finished the 2011–12 season as both the club's and the league's top scorer with 36 league goals during the campaign.

=== Blackburn Rovers ===
Rhodes joined Blackburn Rovers on 30 August 2012, for a then club record £8 million fee. After being unveiled as a Rovers player the following morning, Rhodes said of his move to the Lancashire club: "I'm delighted, it's great to be here and to be part of a prestigious club."

Rhodes made his Blackburn Rovers debut on 1 September 2012 in a 3–3 draw with Leeds United. On 15 September, he scored twice in a 5–3 away win against Bristol City. On 6 November, he scored a goal on his return to Huddersfield Town in a 2–2 draw. On 17 November, he scored his first Blackburn Rovers hat-trick against Peterborough United in a 4–1 victory for Rovers. Rhodes was named Blackburn's player of the season and he received his trophy at Ewood Park on 27 April 2013, before Blackburn's 1–1 draw at home to Crystal Palace. Rhodes celebrated this achievement with his 26th league goal of the season, a deft lob from an acute angle over Palace goalkeeper Julián Speroni.

He began the 2013–14 season in fine form, scoring consecutive braces against Barnsley and Bolton Wanderers to take his tally to nine goals after seven games in the season. By the turn of the year Rhodes had 15 league goals in 24 games, and scored the opener in a 2–1 away win at Leeds United. On 15 March 2014, Rhodes scored a hat-trick against his former club Huddersfield Town in a 4–2 away win.

On 10 July 2014, Rhodes extended his contract with Blackburn Rovers to 2019. He said of the contract extension: "I'm very happy. It is a fantastic football club and I'm very lucky to be here." On 19 April 2015, Rhodes was selected in The Football Manager Team of the Decade at the Football League Awards. On 24 July 2015, Rhodes expressed his displeasure after Blackburn rejected an offer for him in excess of £10 million from Middlesbrough.

=== Middlesbrough ===
On 1 February 2016, Rhodes signed for Championship club Middlesbrough, on a four-and-a-half-year deal, for an undisclosed fee. At the club, he was linked up with his uncle, assistant manager Steve Agnew. The signing of Rhodes led to the departure of fellow striker, Kike García, as the latter player felt that he would not be able to make as many first-team appearances with the club having both Rhodes and David Nugent as strikers. He was given the number 9 shirt, previously worn by Kike.

Rhodes made his debut on 6 February 2016, against his previous club Blackburn Rovers, which ended in a 1–1 home draw. He would go on to score his first league goal for the club in the following match, which would result in a 1–1 away draw against Milton Keynes Dons. Rhodes recorded his final goal of the season in the second-from-last league match on 29 April 2016, which would result in a 2–2 away draw to Birmingham City.

At the end of the 2015–16 season, Rhodes recorded 6 goals in 18 league appearances. Middlesbrough also secured promotion to the 2016–17 Premier League, finishing as runners-up behind champions Burnley, and determining their promotion on the final day of the season, in a 1–1 home draw against Brighton & Hove Albion, taking place on 7 May 2016.

Following the signing of Álvaro Negredo on loan from Valencia, Rhodes' future with the club did not look certain, creating extra pressure for him to be in the first-team squad. He managed to play six league games for the 2016–17 season, but was unable to score a goal.

=== Sheffield Wednesday ===
On 1 February 2017, it was announced that Rhodes had signed for Sheffield Wednesday, on loan for the rest of the season. He made his debut for the club on 3 February 2017, in a 1–0 away victory to Wigan Athletic.

A successful loan spell led to the club to finish in fourth place for the 2016–17 EFL Championship season, qualifying for the play-offs, in an attempt to receive promotion to the 2017–18 Premier League season. After a 1–1 aggregate score, Wednesday lost 3–4 on penalties to Huddersfield Town, thus confirming their stay in the second level of English football for the 2017–18 EFL Championship season.

He joined Sheffield Wednesday on a permanent basis on 1 July 2017, as agreed at the time of the loan deal.

On 10 July 2018, Rhodes joined fellow Championship side Norwich City on a season-long loan.

On 20 May 2021 it was announced that he would leave Sheffield Wednesday at the end of the season, following the expiry of his contract.

=== Return to Huddersfield Town ===
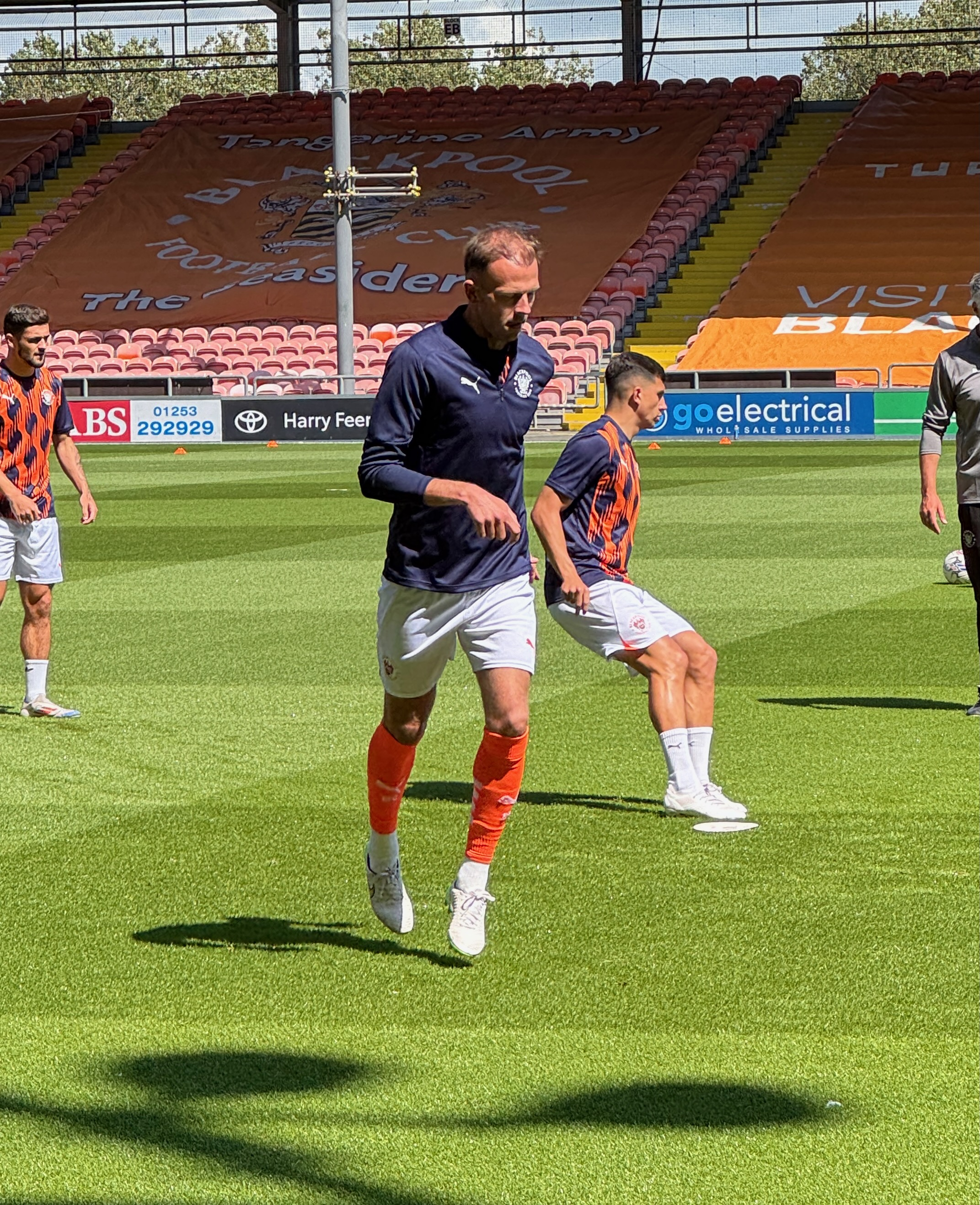
Rhodes in July 2024

On 21 May 2021, a day after it was announced he was to leave Sheffield Wednesday, Huddersfield Town announced Rhodes had agreed to re-sign for them, nine years after he left to sign for Blackburn Rovers. He signed a three-year contract with his contract starting on 1 July 2021.

==== Blackpool (loan) ====
Rhodes joined League One club Blackpool on 25 August 2023, on loan until the end of the season. In his first eight league games for the club, he scored seven goals, including a hat-trick against Reading in a 4–1 victory on 23 September.

He was sent off for the first time in his 17-year career on 9 March 2024. The dismissal was overturned on appeal two days later.

=== Permanent move to Blackpool ===
On 3 June 2024, Rhodes agreed to join Blackpool on a twelve-month contract from 1 July.

==== Mansfield (loan) ====
Rhodes joined Mansfield Town on 3 February 2025 on loan until the end of the season.

=== Retirement ===
On 3 September 2025, Rhodes announced his retirement from playing football, and became the loans manager at Blackburn Rovers.

== International career ==
=== Under-21 ===
Rhodes became eligible to play for Scotland because he attended school there for more than five years while his English father Andy Rhodes played for Scottish clubs. In July 2010, it was reported by The Scotsman newspaper that Rhodes was being considered for selection by the Scotland national under-21 football team. He received his first call-up to the Scotland under-21 squad in November 2010, but was immediately withdrawn because Huddersfield were due to play an FA Cup replay against Cambridge United on the day before the under-21 match.

Rhodes eventually made his debut for Scotland under-21s on 24 March 2011, in a 1–0 loss to Belgium in Deinze. He made his home debut on 10 August 2011, in the 3–0 win over Norway at St Mirren Park. He scored his first goals for Scotland with a hat-trick in a 5–1 win against Luxembourg at Stade Josy Barthel, Luxembourg City on 6 October 2011. Four days later, Rhodes scored both of the Scotland goals in a 2–2 draw against Austria. He also scored in Scotland's 2–1 victory over Netherlands in an U21 qualifier for the 2013 U21 European Championships. After scoring two goals against Bulgaria in only his eighth appearance for the team, he became the all-time leading scorer for the Scottish U21s.

=== Senior team ===
Rhodes was included in the full Scotland squad for their match against Cyprus at the Antonis Papadopoulos Stadium in Larnaca on 11 November 2011, as a reward for his October form for Huddersfield and the under-21s. He was an 87th-minute substitute for Jamie Mackie and had a stinging shot parried by the Cyprus goalkeeper in injury time. Scotland won the match 2–1. Rhodes said to the press after the game, "It was never in doubt I would be sticking with Scotland. I'm Scottish through and through. I had all the jerseys as a kid and grew up watching Scotland."

Rhodes made his first start for the Scots in the friendly against Australia at Easter Road. He marked the occasion with a goal, a superb header to draw Scotland level, after Mark Bresciano opened the scoring for the Australians. Scotland went on to win 3–1 with an own goal from Jason Davidson and a third from Ross McCormack.

== Personal life ==
Rhodes is married to Emma, with whom he had a son in 2018.

== Career statistics ==
=== Club ===
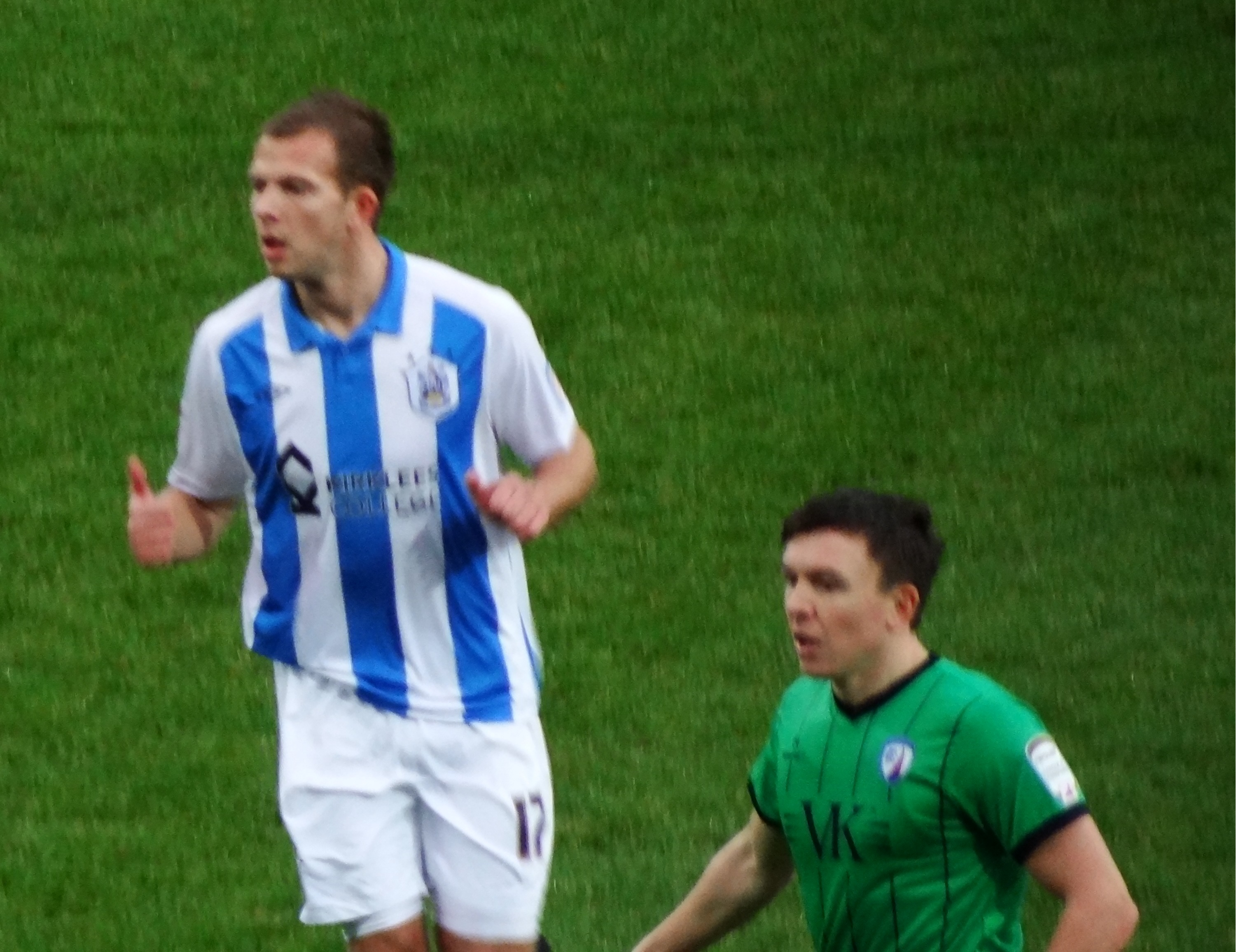
Rhodes (left) playing for Huddersfield Town in 2011

As of 3 May 2025

Appearances and goals by club, season and competition
Club	Season	League			FA Cup		League Cup		Other		Total	
Club	Season	Division	Apps	Goals	Apps	Goals	Apps	Goals	Apps	Goals	Apps	Goals
Ipswich Town	2007–08	Championship	8	1	—		0	0	—		8	1
Ipswich Town	2008–09	Championship	2	0	0	0	0	0	—		2	0
Ipswich Town	Total		10	1	0	0	0	0	—		10	1
Oxford United (loan)	2007–08	Conference Premier	4	0	1	2	—		—		5	2
Rochdale (loan)	2008–09	League Two	5	2	—		—		—		5	2
Brentford (loan)	2008–09	League Two	14	7	—		—		—		14	7
Huddersfield Town	2009–10	League One	45	19	3	1	2	3	3 (Note: One appearance in Football League Trophy, two in League One play-offs)	0	53	23
Huddersfield Town	2010–11	League One	37	16	4	1	1	1	6 (Note: Four appearances and four goals in Football League Trophy, two in League One play-offs)	4	48	22
Huddersfield Town	2011–12	League One	40	36	0	0	1	2	4 (Note: One appearance in Football League Trophy, three appearances and two goals in League One play-offs)	2	45	40
Huddersfield Town	2012–13	Championship	2	2	—		0	0	—		2	2
Huddersfield Town	Total		124	73	7	2	4	6	13	6	148	87
Blackburn Rovers	2012–13	Championship	43	27	5	1	—		—		48	28
Blackburn Rovers	2013–14	Championship	46	25	1	0	1	0	—		48	25
Blackburn Rovers	2014–15	Championship	45	21	2	0	0	0	—		47	21
Blackburn Rovers	2015–16	Championship	25	10	1	1	0	0	—		26	11
Blackburn Rovers	Total		159	83	9	2	1	0	—		169	85
Middlesbrough	2015–16	Championship	18	6	—		—		—		18	6
Middlesbrough	2016–17	Premier League	6	0	0	0	0	0	—		6	0
Middlesbrough	Total		24	6	0	0	0	0	—		24	6
Sheffield Wednesday (loan)	2016–17	Championship	18	3	—		—		2 (Note: Appearances in Championship play-offs)	0	20	3
Sheffield Wednesday	2017–18	Championship	31	5	3	0	1	2	—		35	7
Sheffield Wednesday	2019–20	Championship	16	3	1	0	2	0	—		21	3
Sheffield Wednesday	2020–21	Championship	36	7	0	0	2	0	—		39	7
Sheffield Wednesday	Total		83	15	4	0	5	0	—		95	17
Norwich City (loan)	2018–19	Championship	36	6	1	0	3	3	0	0	40	9
Huddersfield Town	2021–22	Championship	21	3	3	0	1	0	3 (Note: Appearances in Championship play-offs)	1	28	4
Huddersfield Town	2022–23	Championship	34	5	0	0	1	1	0	0	35	6
Huddersfield Town	2023–24	Championship	0	0	0	0	1	0	0	0	1	0
Huddersfield Town	Total		55	8	3	0	3	1	3	1	64	10
Blackpool (loan)	2023–24	League One	29	15	3	0	—		0	0	32	15
Blackpool	2024–25	League One	21	0	2	1	1	0	4 (Note: Appearances in EFL Trophy)	2	28	3
Mansfield Town (loan)	2024–25	League One	14	1	—		—		—		14	1
Career total			596	220	30	7	17	12	22	9	665	248

=== International ===
As of match played 26 March 2017

Appearances and goals by national team and year
National team	Year	Apps	Goals
Scotland	2011	1	0
Scotland	2012	4	3
Scotland	2013	6	0
Scotland	2015	2	0
Scotland	2017	1	0
Total		14	3

As of match played 29 March 2015. Scotland score listed first, score column indicates score after each Rhodes goal.

International goals by date, venue, cap, opponent, score, result and competition
No.	Date	Venue	Cap	Opponent	Score	Result	Competition	Ref
1	15 August 2012	Easter Road, Edinburgh, Scotland	2	Australia	1–1	3–1	Friendly	
2	14 November 2012	Stade Josy Barthel, Luxembourg City, Luxembourg	5	Luxembourg	1–0	2–1	Friendly	
3	14 November 2012	Stade Josy Barthel, Luxembourg City, Luxembourg	5	Luxembourg	2–0	2–1	Friendly	

== Honours ==
Brentford

- Football League Two: 2008–09

Huddersfield Town

- Football League One play-offs: 2012

Middlesbrough

- Football League Championship runner-up: 2015–16

Norwich City

- EFL Championship: 2018–19

Individual

- PFA Fans' Player of the Year: 2008–09 League Two
- PFA Team of the Year: 2011–12 League One
- The Football League Team of the Decade
- SFWA International Player of the Year: 2012–13
- Ipswich Town Young Player of the Year: 2007–08
- Blackburn Rovers Player of the Year: 2012–13

== See also ==
- List of Scotland international footballers born outside Scotland
