= Jacob Chapman =

Australian association football player

Personal information
- Full name: Jacob Anthony Chapman
- Date of birth: 22 October 2000 (age 26)
- Place of birth: Wahroonga, Australia
- Height: 1.88 m (6 ft 2 in)
- Position: Goalkeeper

Team information
- Current team: St Mirren
- Number: 1

Youth career
- Sydney United 58

Senior career*
Years	Team	Apps	(Gls)
2017	Sydney United 58	2	(0)
2018	Marconi Stallions	0	(0)
2019–2026	Huddersfield Town	25	(0)
2019	→ Ossett United (loan)	2	(0)
2021–2022	→ Gateshead (loan)	23	(0)
2022	→ Salford City (loan)	2	(0)
2024	→ Rochdale (loan)	6	(0)
2026	→ Crawley Town (loan)	20	(0)
2026–	St Mirren	14	(0)
- * Club domestic league appearances and goals as of 08:39, 22 November 2026 (UTC)

Jacob Anthony Chapman (born 22 October 2000) is an Australian professional soccer player who plays as a goalkeeper for Scottish Premiership club St Mirren.

== Career ==
Born in Wahroonga, Chapman spent his early career with Sydney United 58 and Marconi Stallions, before moving to England in 2018. He signed for Huddersfield Town in January 2019 following a trial, and spent loan spells in non-league at Ossett United and Gateshead. He moved on loan to Salford City on 1 September 2022.

He made his debut for Huddersfield Town on 26 December 2023 in their 3–0 win against Blackburn Rovers, replacing the injured Chris Maxwell.

On 21 March 2024, Chapman moved to Rochdale on loan until the end of the 2023–24 season. He signed on loan for Crawley Town in January 2026.

=== St Mirren ===
On 1 July 2026, Chapman signed for Scottish Premiership club St Mirren on an initial two-year deal for an undisclosed fee.

== Career statistics ==
As of match played 21 November 2026.

Club	Season	Division	League		National Cup		League Cup		Other		Total	
Club	Season	Division	Apps	Goals	Apps	Goals	Apps	Goals	Apps	Goals	Apps	Goals
Sydney United	2017	National Premier Leagues NSW	2	0	0	0	0	0	0	0	2	0
Marconi Stallions	2018	National Premier Leagues NSW	0	0	0	0	0	0	0	0	0	0
Huddersfield Town	2019–20	EFL Championship	0	0	0	0	0	0	0	0	0	0
Huddersfield Town	2020–21	EFL Championship	0	0	0	0	0	0	0	0	0	0
Huddersfield Town	2021–22	EFL Championship	0	0	0	0	0	0	0	0	0	0
Huddersfield Town	2022–23	EFL Championship	0	0	0	0	0	0	0	0	0	0
Huddersfield Town	2023–24	EFL Championship	2	0	0	0	0	0	0	0	2	0
Huddersfield Town	2024–25	EFL League One	23	0	0	0	0	0	3 (Note: Appearance(s) in the EFL Trophy.)	0	26	0
Huddersfield Town	2025–26	EFL League One	0	0	0	0	0	0	0	0	0	0
Huddersfield Town	Total		25	0	0	0	0	0	3	0	28	0
Ossett United (loan)	2019–20	Northern Premier League Division One North West	2	0	0	0	0	0	1 (Note: Appearance(s) in the FA Trophy.)	0	3	0
Gateshead (loan)	2021–22	National League North	23	0	5	0	0	0	1	0	29	0
Salford City (loan)	2022–23	EFL League Two	2	0	0	0	0	0	3	0	5	0
Rochdale (loan)	2023–24	National League	5	0	0	0	0	0	0	0	5	0
Crawley Town (loan)	2025–26	EFL League Two	20	0	0	0	0	0	0	0	20	0
St Mirren	2026–27	Scottish Premiership	14	0	0	0	5	0	0	0	19	0
Career total			93	0	5	0	5	0	8	0	111	0
