= David Kasumu =

English footballer (born 1999)

- Kasamu in 2016

Personal information
- Full name: David Ayomide Kolade Kasumu
- Date of birth: 5 October 1999 (age 27)
- Place of birth: Lambeth, England
- Height: 5 ft 11 in (1.80 m)
- Position: Central midfielder

Team information
- Current team: Huddersfield Town
- Number: 18

Youth career
- 2013–2017: Milton Keynes Dons

Senior career*
Years	Team	Apps	(Gls)
2017–2022	Milton Keynes Dons	69	(1)
2022–	Huddersfield Town	126	(4)
- * Club domestic league appearances and goals as of 15 April 2026 (UTC)

David Ayomide Kolade Kasumu (born 5 October 1999) is an English professional footballer who plays as a central midfielder for EFL League One club Huddersfield Town.

== Club career ==
=== Milton Keynes Dons ===
Kasumu joined Milton Keynes Dons' academy in 2013, and went on to progress through various age groups before moving into the club's development squad. On 30 April 2016, he was named as a substitute for the first team's away trip to Ipswich Town but did not feature.

On 9 August 2016, Kasumu made his full professional debut for the club, playing 62 minutes in a 2–3 EFL Cup first round away win over Newport County. On 26 December 2017, he signed professional terms, a one-and-a-half-year deal which was later extended a further year. On 13 August 2019, Kasumu scored his first goal for the club in a 2–2 EFL Cup first round encounter with rivals AFC Wimbledon. He signed a new contract in December 2019, with undisclosed terms. Towards the end of the 2021–22 season Kasumu was offered another contract extension but decided to leave the club upon the expiry of his existing deal to pursue a move elsewhere.

=== Huddersfield Town ===
On 6 July 2022, Kasumu signed for EFL Championship club Huddersfield Town on a three-year deal until 2025, with an undisclosed amount of compensation paid to Milton Keynes Dons due to his age.

== International career ==
In July 2015, Kasumu was called up to the Nigeria U15 national team and took part in a training camp in Abuja.

== Career statistics ==
As of 26 December 2024

Club	Season	League			FA Cup		League Cup		Other		Total	
Club	Season	Division	Apps	Goals	Apps	Goals	Apps	Goals	Apps	Goals	Apps	Goals
Milton Keynes Dons	2016–17	League One	0	0	0	0	1	0	0	0	1	0
Milton Keynes Dons	2017–18	League One	1	0	0	0	0	0	1 (Note: Appearances in EFL Trophy.)	0	2	0
Milton Keynes Dons	2018–19	League Two	0	0	0	0	1	0	2	0	3	0
Milton Keynes Dons	2019–20	League One	21	1	1	0	3	1	4	0	29	2
Milton Keynes Dons	2020–21	League One	24	0	1	0	1	0	4	0	30	0
Milton Keynes Dons	2021–22	League One	23	0	1	0	1	0	3 (Note: Two appearances in EFL Trophy, one appearance in League One play-offs)	0	28	0
Milton Keynes Dons	Total		69	1	3	0	7	1	14	0	93	2
Huddersfield Town	2022–23	Championship	33	0	1	0	0	0	—		34	0
Huddersfield Town	2023–24	Championship	31	1	0	0	0	0	—		31	1
Huddersfield Town	2024–25	League One	17	3	1	0	1	0	2	1	21	4
Huddersfield Town	Total		81	4	2	0	1	0	2	1	86	4
Career total			150	5	5	0	8	1	16	1	179	7

== Honours ==
Individual

- Milton Keynes Dons Academy Player of the Year: 2017–18
