= Bishop Thomas Grant School =

Coordinates: 51°25′30″N 0°07′09″W

Location
- Belltrees Grove; Streatham, London, SW16 2HY; England

Information
- Type: Voluntary aided school
- Religious affiliation: Roman Catholic
- Established: 9 September 1959
- Local authority: Lambeth
- Department for Education URN: 100638 Tables
- Ofsted: Reports
- Headteacher: Bernadette Boyle
- Gender: Coeducational
- Age: 11 to 19
- Enrolment: 1202
- Houses: Matthew, Mark, Luke, John
- Website: http://www.btg.ac/

Bishop Thomas Grant School (BTG) is a coeducational Roman Catholic secondary school and sixth form, situated in the Streatham area of the London Borough of Lambeth, England.

The school is named after the first Catholic Bishop of Southwark, Thomas Grant (1816–1870) who was named in the First Vatican Council. The school was opened on 9 September 1959. BTG is a specialist school in Mathematics and ICT. In September 2009 Bishop Thomas Grant re-opened their sixth form which had closed in 1986. In their 2014 Ofsted inspection, BTG received a mark of outstanding in every category.

== Notable alumni ==
- Ben Cross (1947–2020) – actor
- George Ndah (b. 1974) – footballer, Crystal Palace F.C.
- Nathaniel Clyne (b. 1991) – footballer, Crystal Palace F.C.
- Muyiwa Oki (b. 1991) - architect, President of RIBA
- Nathaniel Chalobah (b. 1994) – footballer, West Bromwich Albion F.C.
- Viv Solomon (b. 1996) – footballer
- Trevoh Chalobah (b. 1999) – footballer, Chelsea F.C.
- Giosue Bellagambi (b. 2001) – footballer, Huddersfield Town F.C.
- Jesse Debrah (b. 2000) – footballer, Port Vale F.C.
