= Alex Matos =

English footballer (born 2004)

Personal information
- Full name: Alex Ojahn Matos
- Date of birth: 3 October 2004 (age 22)
- Place of birth: Bedford, England
- Height: 1.75 m (5 ft 9 in)
- Position: Defensive midfielder

Team information
- Current team: Göztepe (on loan from Sheffield United)
- Number: 6

Youth career
- Kempston Colts
- –2016: Luton Town
- 2016–2023: Norwich City
- 2023: Chelsea

Senior career*
Years	Team	Apps	(Gls)
2023–2025	Chelsea	1	(0)
2024	→ Huddersfield Town (loan)	19	(1)
2025	→ Oxford United (loan)	20	(0)
2025–	Sheffield United	8	(0)
2026–	→ Göztepe (loan)	1	(1)

International career^{‡}
2018	England U15		
2024–	England U20	2	(0)
- * Club domestic league appearances and goals as of 17 August 2026 (UTC) ‡ National team caps and goals as of 08:42, 14 June 2024 (UTC)

Alex Ojahn Matos (born 3 October 2004) is an English professional footballer who plays as a defensive midfielder for Süper Lig club Göztepe, on loan from EFL Championship club Sheffield United.

== Club career ==
=== Early career ===
Born in Bedford, educated at Langley School, Norfolk. Matos started his career with Kempston Colts, later joining Luton Town at under-9 level, before joining Norwich City in 2016. Matos can play in attacking midfield, either wing or as a striker. He became a regular for Norwich's Under-18s during the 2022–23 season. He also made his debut for the Under-21s and scored three goals in the Premier League 2 for the latter.

=== Chelsea ===
On 1 July 2023, Matos signed for Premier League side Chelsea. The transfer was reported as a free transfer with add-ons.

On 2 October 2023, a day before his 19th birthday, Matos made his professional debut in the Premier League match against Fulham. He came off the bench in stoppage time, replacing Enzo Fernández in a 2–0 away victory.

==== Loan to Huddersfield ====
On 4 January 2024, Matos signed for EFL Championship side Huddersfield Town on loan until the end of the season. He scored his first senior goal in a 5–3 defeat to Southampton. He made 19 league appearances for the Terriers as Huddersfield were relegated to League One.

==== Loan to Oxford United ====
On 10 January 2025, Matos joined EFL Championship side Oxford United on loan until the end of the season.

=== Sheffield United ===
On 1 September 2025, Matos made a permanent move to EFL Championship club Sheffield United for an undisclosed fee, signing a three-year deal.

On 2 July 2026, Matos joined Turkish Süper Lig club Göztepe on a season-long loan.

== International career ==
Matos is of Ghanaian descent. He has represented England at the under-15 level.

On 7 June 2024, Matos made his England U20 debut during a 2–1 win over Sweden at Stadion ŠRC Sesvete.

== Career statistics ==
=== Club ===
As of match played 29 December 2025

Appearances and goals by club, season and competition
Club	Season	League			National cup		League cup		Europe		Other		Total	
Club	Season	Division	Apps	Goals	Apps	Goals	Apps	Goals	Apps	Goals	Apps	Goals	Apps	Goals
Chelsea U21	2023–24	—			—		—		—		2 (Note: Appearance in EFL Trophy)	0	2	0
Chelsea U21	2024–25	—			—		—		—		2	0	2	0
Chelsea U21	Total		0	0	0	0	0	0	0	0	4	0	4	0
Chelsea	2023–24	Premier League	1	0	0	0	1	0	—		—		2	0
Huddersfield Town (loan)	2023–24	Championship	19	1	1	0	—		—		—		20	1
Oxford United (loan)	2024–25	Championship	20	0	1	0	—		—		—		21	0
Sheffield United	2025–26	Championship	8	0	0	0	—		—		—		8	0
Sheffield United	2026–27	Championship	0	0	0	0	0	0	—		—		0	0
Sheffield United	Total		8	0	0	0	0	0	0	0	0	0	8	0
Göztepe (loan)	2026–27	Süper Lig	0	0	0	0	—		—		—		0	0
Career total			48	1	2	0	1	0	0	0	4	0	55	1
