= Brahima Diarra =

Malian footballer (born 2003)

Personal information
- Full name: Brahima Diarra
- Date of birth: 5 July 2003 (age 23)
- Place of birth: Paris, France
- Height: 1.74 m (5 ft 9 in)
- Position: Midfielder

Team information
- Current team: Al Wahda
- Number: 94

Youth career
- Montrouge F.C. 92
- AC Boulogne-Billancourt
- 2019–2020: Huddersfield Town

Senior career*
| Years | Team | Apps | (Gls) |
| 2020–2024 | Huddersfield Town | 41 | (0) |
| 2022 | → Harrogate Town (loan) | 10 | (1) |
| 2024– | Al Wahda | 42 | (6) |

International career^{‡}
| 2023– | Mali U23 | 1 | (0) |
| 2025– | Mali | 1 | (0) |
- * Club domestic league appearances and goals as of 16 March 2026 ‡ National team caps and goals as of 08:37, 28 March 2023 (UTC)

Brahima Diarra (born 5 July 2003) is a professional footballer who last played as a midfielder for UAE Pro League club Al Wahda. Born in France, he plays for the Mali national team.

== Club career ==
Born in Paris, France, Diarra started his football career playing for local Parisian club Montrouge F.C. 92, before moving to Athletic Club de Boulogne-Billancourt.

Alongside fellow Frenchman Loick Ayina, he moved to Huddersfield Town in July 2019, and they both signed professional contracts with the club a year later.

Diarra made his senior debut for Huddersfield Town on 12 December 2020, when he played as a substitute in their 5–0 EFL Championship defeat against AFC Bournemouth.

On 4 January 2022, Diarra joined EFL League Two side Harrogate Town on loan for the remainder of the 2021–22 season.

He was released by Huddersfield in summer 2024. He signed for Al Wahda FC in September 2024.

== International career ==
Diarra is eligible to represent either France or Mali internationally, as he was born in France to parents from Mali. On 17 March 2023, Diarra was selected to play for the Mali national under-23 football team for their Africa U-23 Cup of Nations qualifiers against Senegal U23. He made his debut as a second-half substitute in their 3–1 loss to Senegal on 22 March 2023. He was called up to the senior Mali national team for a set of friendlies in November 2025.

== Career statistics ==
As of match played 7 October 2023

Appearances and goals by club, season and competition
| Club | Season | League | | | FA Cup | | League Cup | | Other | | Total | |
| Club | Season | Division | Apps | Goals | Apps | Goals | Apps | Goals | Apps | Goals | Apps | Goals |
|---|---|---|---|---|---|---|---|---|---|---|---|---|
| Huddersfield Town | 2020–21 | Championship | 1 | 0 | 1 | 0 | 0 | 0 | 0 | 0 | 2 | 0 |
| Huddersfield Town | 2021–22 | Championship | 0 | 0 | 0 | 0 | 0 | 0 | 0 | 0 | 0 | 0 |
| Huddersfield Town | 2022–23 | Championship | 19 | 0 | 1 | 0 | 0 | 0 | 0 | 0 | 20 | 0 |
| Huddersfield Town | 2023–24 | Championship | 8 | 0 | 0 | 0 | 1 | 0 | 0 | 0 | 9 | 0 |
| Huddersfield Town | Total | | 28 | 0 | 2 | 0 | 1 | 0 | 0 | 0 | 31 | 0 |
| Harrogate Town (loan) | 2021–22 | League Two | 10 | 1 | 1 | 0 | 0 | 0 | 2 (Note: Appearances in EFL Trophy) | 0 | 14 | 1 |
| Career total | | | 38 | 1 | 3 | 0 | 1 | 0 | 2 | 0 | 45 | 1 |
