= Charles Ondo =

Equatoguinean footballer (born 2003)

Personal information
- Full name: Charles Nduwuisi Ondo
- Date of birth: 22 October 2003 (age 23)
- Place of birth: Madrid, Spain
- Height: 1.90 m (6 ft 3 in)
- Position: Left-back

Team information
- Current team: Hødd
- Number: 2

Youth career
- 2011–2020: Millwall
- 2020–2024: Huddersfield Town

Senior career*
Years	Team	Apps	(Gls)
2022	Huddersfield Town	2	(0)
2023	→ Waterford (loan)	2	(0)
2024	Ebbsfleet United	1	(0)
2024	→ Hemel Hempstead Town (loan)	3	(0)
2025–2026	Portland Timbers 2	43	(4)
2026–	Hødd	6	(0)

International career^{‡}
2023–	Equatorial Guinea	8	(0)
- * Club domestic league appearances and goals as of 14 November 2026 ‡ National team caps and goals as of 26 August 2026

Charles Nduwuisi Ondo (born 22 October 2003) is a professional footballer who plays as a left-back for Norwegian First Division club Hødd. Born in Spain, he plays for the Equatorial Guinea national team.

== Early life ==
Ondo was born in Madrid, Spain and moved to England at a young age. He was born to a Nigerian father and an Equatorial Guinean mother.

== Club career ==
Ondo is a youth product of Millwall starting at U8 levels, and moved to Huddersfield Town's youth side in 2020. He was promoted to Huddersfield Town's B-team shortly after, and signed his first professional contract with the club on 25 February 2022 until 2023. and was first called up to their senior side in October 2022.

He made his professional and EFL Championship debut as a late substitute with Huddersfield Town in a 2–0 win to Hull City on 9 October 2022. On 15 February 2023, Ondo signed for League of Ireland First Division club Waterford on loan.

On 31 August 2024, Ondo joined National League club Ebbsfleet United. In October 2024, he joined National League South side Hemel Hempstead Town on an initial twenty-eight day loan.

On 9 December 2024, he departed Ebbsfleet United by mutual consent. On 14 January 2025, he joined National League South side Welling United. On 1 April 2025, Ondo signed for MLS Next Pro club Portland Timbers 2.

On 2 September 2026, he joined Norwegian First Division club Hødd.

== International career ==
On 9 March 2023, Ondo was called up to the Equatorial Guinea national football team for their Africa Cup of Nations qualifiers against Botswana. He made his debut on 6 September 2023.

== Career statistics ==
=== Club ===
As of match played 26 October 2024

Appearances and goals by club, season and competition
Club	Season	League			National cup (Note: Includes FA Cup, FAI Cup)		League Cup (Note: Includes EFL Cup, League of Ireland Cup, National League Cup)		Other		Total	
Club	Season	Division	Apps	Goals	Apps	Goals	Apps	Goals	Apps	Goals	Apps	Goals
Huddersfield Town	2022-23	Championship	2	0	0	0	0	0	—		2	0
Waterford (loan)	2023	LOI First Division	2	0	0	0	—		0	0	2	0
Ebbsfleet United	2024-25	National League	1	0	0	0	1	1	—		2	1
Hemel Hempstead Town (loan)	2024-25	National League North	3	0	0	0	—		—		3	0
Career total			8	0	0	0	1	1	0	0	9	1

=== International ===
As of match played 10 June 2024

Appearances and goals by national team and year
National team	Year	Apps	Goals
Equatorial Guinea	2023	2	0
Equatorial Guinea	2024	2	0
Total		4	0
