= Ben Jackson (footballer, born 2001) =

English footballer

Personal information
- Full name: Ben Joseph Jackson
- Date of birth: 22 February 2001 (age 25)
- Place of birth: Stockport, England
- Height: 5 ft 10 in (1.77 m)
- Positions: Left-back; left wing-back; midfielder; left winger

Team information
- Current team: Barrow
- Number: 30

Youth career
- 2015–2019: Huddersfield Town

Senior career*
Years	Team	Apps	(Gls)
2019–2024	Huddersfield Town	32	(2)
2019	→ Darlington (loan)	7	(1)
2019	→ Stockport County (loan)	18	(1)
2020	→ Stockport County (loan)	6	(0)
2021	→ Bolton Wanderers (loan)	5	(1)
2022	→ Doncaster Rovers (loan)	14	(0)
2024–	Barrow	45	(1)
- * Club domestic league appearances and goals as of 23:19, 27 November 2023 (UTC)

Ben Joseph Jackson (born 22 February 2001) is an English professional footballer who plays as a left-back, left wing-back, midfielder or left winger for EFL League Two club Barrow.

== Career ==
Born in Stockport, Jackson joined Huddersfield Town at under-15 level. He moved on loan to Darlington in March 2019, where he played seven games. He then joined his hometown club, Stockport County, on loan, where he played 26 games over two spells during the 2019–20 season.

Jackson made his senior debut for Huddersfield on 5 September 2020, when he played in their EFL Cup defeat against Rochdale.

On 16 January 2021, Jackson joined League Two side Bolton Wanderers on loan until the end of the season. He made his debut the same day, starting in a 1–1 draw against Cheltenham Town. His first goal came on 24 April when he scored the only goal in Bolton's 1–0 win against Morecambe. He helped the Trotters win promotion to League One, appearing in five matches in total.

On 28 January 2022, Jackson signed for League One club Doncaster Rovers on loan, until the end of the season.

== Personal life ==
Jackson is half-Scottish.

== Career statistics ==
As of match played 5 May 2024

Appearances and goals by club, season and competition
Club	Season	League			FA Cup		League Cup		Other		Total	
Club	Season	Division	Apps	Goals	Apps	Goals	Apps	Goals	Apps	Goals	Apps	Goals
Huddersfield Town	2018–19	Premier League	0	0	0	0	0	0	–		0	0
Huddersfield Town	2019–20	Championship	0	0	0	0	0	0	–		0	0
Huddersfield Town	2020–21	Championship	1	0	1	0	1	0	–		3	0
Huddersfield Town	2022–23	Championship	25	1	0	0	1	0	–		26	1
Total			26	0	1	0	2	0	0	0	29	
Darlington (loan)	2018–19	National League North	7	1	0	0	–		0	0	7	1
Stockport County (loan)	2019–20	National League	24	1	0	0	–		2 (Note: Appearances in FA Trophy)	0	26	1
Bolton Wanderers (loan)	2020–21	League Two	5	1	–		–		–		5	1
Doncaster Rovers (loan)	2021–22	League One	14	0	–		–		–		14	0
Career totals			70	4	1	0	2	0	2	0	75	4

== Honours ==
Bolton Wanderers

- EFL League Two third-place (promotion): 2020–21
