= Giosue Bellagambi =

Uganda international footballer (born 2001)

Personal information
- Date of birth: 8 November 2001 (age 25)
- Place of birth: Croydon, England
- Position: Goalkeeper

Team information
- Current team: Farnborough
- Number: 1

Youth career
- 2011–2016: Lambeth Tigers FC
- 2016–2018: Whyteleafe
- 2018–2020: Huddersfield Town

Senior career*
Years	Team	Apps	(Gls)
2020–2024	Huddersfield Town	0	(0)
2020	→ Ramsbottom United (loan)	4	(0)
2021	→ Ebbsfleet United (loan)	2	(0)
2021	→ Stalybridge Celtic (loan)	1	(0)
2021–2022	→ Brighouse Town (loan)	3	(0)
2022	→ Hyde United (loan)	9	(0)
2022–2023	→ Spennymoor Town (loan)	14	(0)
2023	→ Salford City (loan)	0	(0)
2024–2025	Barnet	1	(0)
2025–2026	Ebbsfleet United	5	(0)
2026–	Farnborough	1	(0)

International career^{‡}
2022–	Uganda	1	(0)
- * Club domestic league appearances and goals as of 22:18, 21 November 2026 (UTC) ‡ National team caps and goals as of 23:05, 31 January 2023 (UTC)

Giosue Bellagambi (born 8 November 2001) is a professional footballer who plays as a goalkeeper for Farnborough. Born in England, he plays for the Uganda national team.

== Club career ==
Bellagambi is a youth product of Lambeth Tigers FC and Whyteleafe, and moved to Huddersfield Town's youth academy in 2018. On 6 August 2020, he signed his first professional contract with Huddersfield Town. He began his senior career on loan with Ramsbottom United in November 2020, where he made 4 appearances. His second loan was with Ebbsfleet United, which ended in March 2021. He had a month-long loan with Stalybridge Celtic in August 2021 after recovering from a fractured finger. On 27 December 2021, he joined Brighouse Town on a 28-day loan. On 26 January 2022, he extended his Huddersfield Town contract until 2024. On 8 August 2022, he moved to Hyde United on a three-month loan. On 6 October 2022, his loan was cut short by Huddersfield. The following day, he signed on loan at National League North side Spennymoor Town on a loan until 2 January 2023. On 31 January 2023, Bellagambi joined EFL League Two side Salford City on loan until the end of the 2022–23 season. Following the conclusion of the 2023–24 season, Bellagambi was released by Huddersfield Town.

On 11 October 2024, Bellagambi joined National League side Barnet. He made two appearances for the club before leaving at the end of the season by mutual consent.

Bellagambi joined Ebbsfleet United for the 2025-26 season, with compensation due to Barnet due to the player's age.

On 21 November 2026, Bellagambi joined fellow National League South club Farnborough.

== International career ==
Bellagambi attended youth training camps for England and Italy. He was first called up to the senior Uganda national team for a set of 2023 Africa Cup of Nations qualification matches in May 2022. He made his debut with Uganda in a 0–0 friendly tie with Libya on 21 September 2022.

== Personal life ==
Bellagambi was born in England to an Italian father and Ugandan mother. His parents met while his father was travelling from Italy to watch Fiorentina vs Arsenal in the UEFA Champions League in October 1999. He attended Bishop Thomas Grant School in his secondary education where he further joined Arsenal on a scholarship. Bellagambi has a sister. Viola, who trained with Sutton United from 2017.
