= Callum Marshall =

Northern Irish footballer

Personal information
- Full name: Callum Marshall
- Date of birth: 28 November 2004 (age 21)
- Place of birth: Glengormley, Northern Ireland
- Height: 1.81 m (5 ft 11 in)
- Position: Striker

Team information
- Current team: Luton Town
- Number: 9

Youth career
- Bangor Rangers
- Glentoran
- –2021: Linfield

Senior career*
Years	Team	Apps	(Gls)
2021–2022	Linfield	2	(0)
2022–2026	West Ham United	2	(0)
2024	→ West Bromwich Albion (loan)	4	(0)
2024–2025	→ Huddersfield Town (loan)	43	(9)
2026	→ VfL Bochum (loan)	16	(2)
2026–	Luton Town	14	(4)

International career^{‡}
2022	Northern Ireland U18	1	(0)
2022–2023	Northern Ireland U19	5	(4)
2023–	Northern Ireland U21	2	(0)
2023–	Northern Ireland	17	(0)
- * Club domestic league appearances and goals as of 18:56, 21 November 2026 (UTC) ‡ National team caps and goals as of 16:25, 6 October 2026 (UTC)

Callum Marshall (born 28 November 2004) is a Northern Irish professional footballer who plays as a striker for EFL League One club Luton Town and the Northern Ireland national team.

== Early life ==
Marshall was born in 2004 in Glengormley, Northern Ireland. He attended Glengormley Integrated Primary School.

== Club career ==
=== Northern Ireland ===
Marshall began his career at Bangor Rangers, playing with the club until the age of seven, before moving to Glentoran. Marshall later moved to play in the academy of rivals Linfield. On 2 November 2021, he scored on his senior debut for Linfield in the Northern Ireland Football League Cup in a 11–0 victory against PSNI. Two weeks later, Marshall made his NIFL Premiership debut for Linfield, coming on as a 90th-minute substitute for Christy Manzinga in a 2–0 victory against Carrick Rangers.

=== West Ham United ===
In January 2022, Marshall joined the youth academy of English Premier League club West Ham United. He scored a goal during his youth debut for the club against the youth academy of West Bromwich Albion. Marshall was a member of the team which won the 2023 FA Youth Cup defeating Arsenal 5–1 at the Emirates Stadium in April 2023. He scored West Ham's second goal, converting Gideon Kodua's cross with a volley from close range. On 16 January 2024, Marshall made his senior debut for West Ham, coming on as an 80th-minute substitute in a 1–0 FA Cup defeat against Bristol City.

==== Loan moves ====
On 26 January 2024, Marshall joined West Bromwich Albion, on loan for the remainder of the 2023–24 season. He made his West Bromwich debut on 3 February coming on as a 62nd minute substitute for Brandon Thomas-Asante in a 1–0 win against Birmingham City. In April, having played only 55 minutes for West Brom, Marshall was allowed to return to West Ham and train and play with their under–21 side while still being available to play for West Brom should they call on him.

On 9 August 2024, Marshall joined League One club Huddersfield Town on a season-long loan deal. He made his debut for Huddersfield on 13 August 2024 in an EFL Cup match against Morecambe, scoring in the 38th minute and assisted for Danny Ward's goal as Huddersfield won 3–0. Impressing with his work ethic, and registering fourteen goal contributions, he was voted Huddersfield Town Player of the Year.

On 7 January 2026, Marshall joined 2. Bundesliga club VfL Bochum on loan for the remainder of the season.

=== Luton Town ===
On 30 July 2026, Marshall signed for League One club Luton Town on a permanent deal.

== International career ==
Marshall is a youth international footballer representing Northern Ireland. In 2023, he was called up to the Northern Ireland national football team. The same year on 16 June, Marshall made his debut as a late substitute against Denmark, in which he had a late goal disallowed by VAR.

== Style of play ==
Marshall can operate as a striker or winger.

== Career statistics ==
=== Club ===
As of match played 21 November 2026

Appearances and goals by club, season and competition
Club	Season	League			National cup (Note: Includes FA Cup, DFB-Pokal)		League cup (Note: Includes Northern Ireland Football League Cup, EFL Cup)		Other		Total	
Club	Season	Division	Apps	Goals	Apps	Goals	Apps	Goals	Apps	Goals	Apps	Goals
Linfield	2021–22	NIFL Premiership	2	0	—		2	1	0	0	4	1
West Ham United U21	2022–23	—			—		—		2 (Note: Appearances in EFL Trophy)	0	2	0
West Ham United U21	2023–24	—			—		—		4	3	4	3
West Ham United U21	2024–25	—			—		—		0	0	0	0
West Ham United U21	2025–26	—			—		—		5 (Note: Three appearances and three goals in EFL Trophy; two appearances and one goal in National League Cup)	4	5	4
West Ham United U21	Total		—		—		—		11	7	11	7
West Ham United	2023–24	Premier League	0	0	1	0	0	0	0	0	1	0
West Ham United	2024–25	Premier League	0	0	0	0	0	0	—		0	0
West Ham United	2025–26	Premier League	2	0	0	0	0	0	—		2	0
West Ham United	Total		2	0	1	0	0	0	0	0	3	0
West Bromwich Albion (loan)	2023–24	Championship	3	0	0	0	0	0	0	0	3	0
Huddersfield Town (loan)	2024–25	League One	43	9	1	0	2	1	0	0	46	10
VfL Bochum (loan)	2025–26	2. Bundesliga	16	2	0	0	—		—		15	2
Luton Town	2026–27	League One	14	4	1	0	1	0	0	0	16	4
Career total			80	15	3	0	5	2	11	7	99	24

=== International ===
As of match played 5 October 2026

Appearances and goals by national team and year
National team	Year	Apps	Goals
Northern Ireland	2023	3	0
Northern Ireland	2024	5	0
Northern Ireland	2025	6	0
Northern Ireland	2026	3	0
Total		17	0

== Honours ==
West Ham United U18

- FA Youth Cup: 2022–23
- U18 Premier League South: 2023

Individual

- Huddersfield Town Player of the Year: 2024–25
