= Jaheim Headley =

English footballer (born 2001)

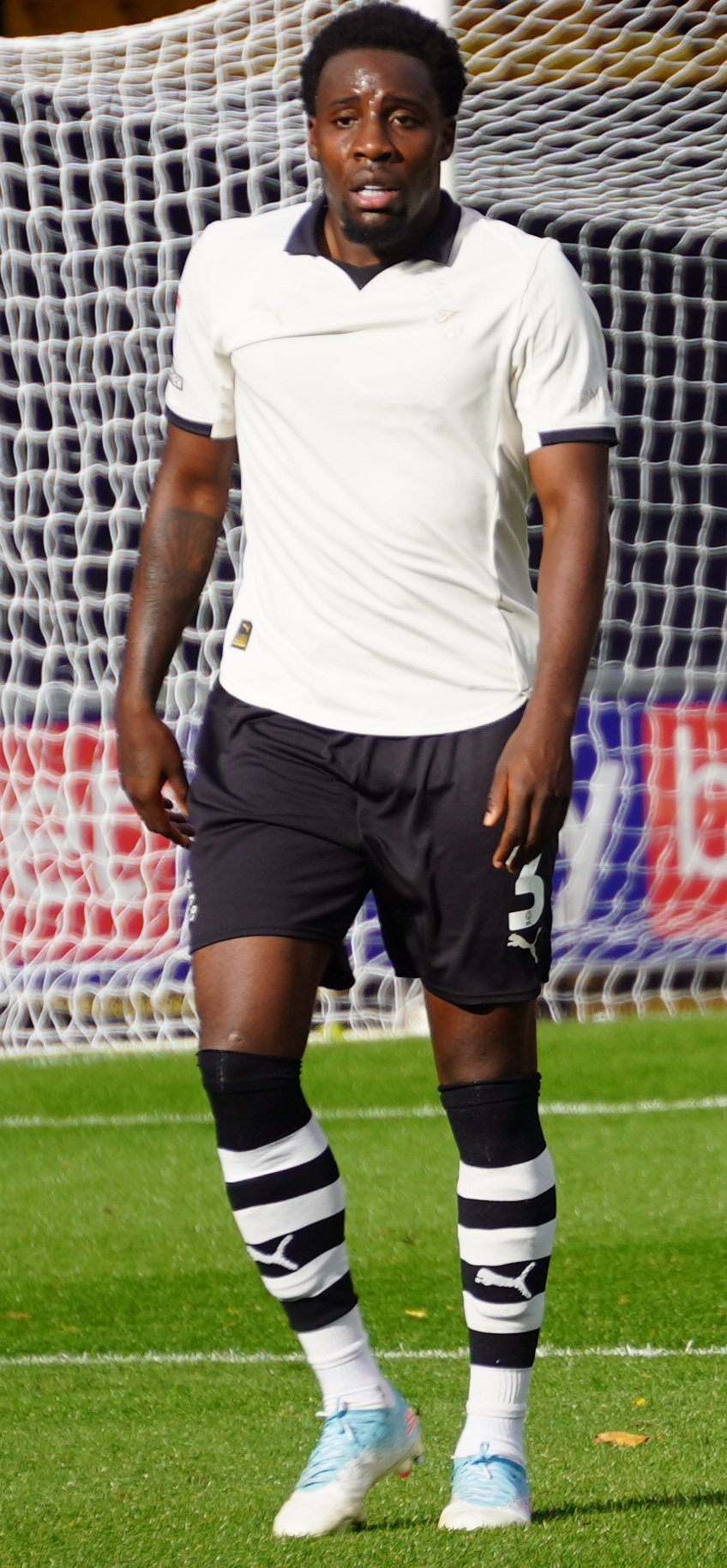
- Headley with Port Vale (2025)

Personal information
- Full name: Jaheim Anthony Headley
- Date of birth: 24 September 2001 (age 25)
- Place of birth: Southwark, England
- Height: 5 ft 9 in (1.76 m)
- Positions: Left wing-back; left-back

Team information
- Current team: Port Vale
- Number: 3

Youth career
- 20??–2016: Millwall
- 2017–2018: Mass Elite Academy
- 2018–2019: Huddersfield Town

Senior career*
Years	Team	Apps	(Gls)
2019–2025	Huddersfield Town	47	(2)
2019	→ Bradford (Park Avenue) (loan)	5	(1)
2020	→ Hyde United (loan)	3	(0)
2020–2021	→ Welling United (loan)	2	(0)
2021–2022	→ Yeovil Town (loan)	0	(0)
2022–2023	→ Harrogate Town (loan)	20	(2)
2025–	Port Vale	48	(6)
- * Club domestic league appearances and goals as of 10:22, 22 November 2026 (UTC)

Jaheim Anthony Headley (born 24 September 2001) is an English professional footballer who plays as a left-back for EFL League Two club Port Vale.

Headley spent time in the youth team at Millwall, then joined Huddersfield Town's under-17 squad via the Mass Elite Academy. He had brief loan spells at Bradford (Park Avenue), Hyde United, Welling United and Yeovil Town in non-League football, before a successful loan period with League Two club Harrogate Town in the first half of the 2022–23 season. This earned him an opportunity to play for Huddersfield in the Championship and he played 54 games for the club, scoring three goals. However, they were relegated to League One in 2024, and he was sold to Port Vale in January 2025.

== Club career ==
=== Huddersfield Town ===
Born in Southwark, London, Headley is eligible to represent England, the United States or Jamaica through his heritage. He started his career at Millwall, though was released at the age of 14 and then spent a year out of the game. He trained at the Mass Elite Academy before he joined Huddersfield Town's under-17 squad in 2018. Headley had marked himself out from other young players by asking Academy head Leigh Bromby what he was looking for on the pitch. It was at the Academy that he switched from midfield to left-back, scoring seven goals in 29 starts for the under-17 team and winning the Waterworth Trophy for Academy Goal of the Year with a powerful drive in a 2–1 win over Manchester United in November 2018.

On 2 August 2019, Headley and teammate Isaac Marriott joined National League North club Bradford (Park Avenue) on a work experience loan after impressing Garry Thompson on trial. On 26 August, Headley scored his first goal in senior football to secure a 1–0 win at Darlington. On 17 January 2020, he joined Hyde United in the Northern Premier League Premier Division on a work experience loan. Manager David McGurk said Headley was an "exciting young player who can cover a few positions". Headley played four games for the "Tigers" at the start of the 2019–20 season.

On 30 October 2020, Headley and teammate Mustapha Olagunju joined National League South side Welling United on a three-month loan deal. Headley made his "Wings" debut the following day in a 2–1 defeat at Eastbourne Borough. He played just one further game, however, and left Park View Road to return to Huddersfield at the start of January. He said the experience of playing senior men's football had aided his development.

On 18 December 2021, Headley joined National League side Yeovil Town on a one-month loan deal. Manager Darren Sarll said he was "drastically short" of squad members following injuries to defenders Morgan Williams and Jack Robinson. Headley did not make his league debut for the "Glovers", though did play one FA Trophy game at Huish Park. Headley was named in a Huddersfield matchday squad for the first time by manager Carlos Corberán on the last day of the 2021–22 season. Headley signed a new two-year contract in May 2022, with the club also retaining a one-year option.

On 21 June 2022, Headley, alongside Terriers teammate Josh Austerfield joined League Two side Harrogate Town on loan for the 2022–23 season. Management duo Simon Weaver and Paul Thirlwell had identified him as a "very dynamic and powerful left-back" who would be hard for the opposition to handle. After a slow start and being left out for some games in September he managed to impress enough to be considered one of the "Sulphurites" best-performing players. He was named on the League Two Team of the Week after providing an assist in a 3–0 win over Mansfield Town. Loan manager David Fox recalled him to Huddersfield on 9 January after Headley claimed two goals and two assists from 25 games for Harrogate. Both of his goals had come from strikes outside the box, against Bradford City and Carlisle United at Wetherby Road. He made his Championship debut for Huddersfield under Mark Fotheringham in a 2–2 draw at Blackpool on 7 February. Eleven days later he scored his first goal at the Kirklees Stadium in a 2–1 victory over Birmingham City in what was manager Neil Warnock's first win in his second spell at the club. Warnock used him primarily as a winger. Headley picked up a hamstring injury and missed six weeks, though recovered to play the last five games of the 2022–23 season.

On 8 August 2023, he was sent off for fouling Isaiah Jones in a 3–2 defeat to Middlesbrough in the EFL Cup. He received racist abuse on social media following the match. He competed with Yuta Nakayama for a first-team place. Headley sustained an ankle injury on New Year's Day and was left out of action for two months as a result, regaining fitness just as André Breitenreiter was installed as the club's new manager. He played regular first-team football in the 2023–24 campaign, gaining confidence and experience despite the club's relegation into League One. He made the most tackles per 90 minutes (3.1) of anybody in the Town squad and finished second in the rankings for successful dribbles and chances created for teammates.

Due to Mickel Miller's form, he found his first-team chances limited in the first half of the 2024–25 season, while manager Michael Duff preferred Josh Koroma and Josh Ruffels when Miller picked up an injury and Duff also signed left-back Ruben Roosken in January. Upon Headley's departure, sporting director Mark Cartwright said that he had shown "flashes of his ability" but had lacked the required consistency. Headley had played 54 league and cup appearances for the Terriers, scoring three goals and providing three assists.

=== Port Vale ===
On 2 January 2025, Headley joined League Two club Port Vale for an undisclosed fee on a two-and-a-half year deal, the move seeing him reunite with former Huddersfield Town manager Darren Moore. He scored the winning goal on his home debut at Vale Park, a 3–2 victory over Newport County on 18 January. This won him a place on the EFL Team of the Week. He followed this up with a player of the match performance against Chesterfield. Vale fans voted him as their Player of the Month for January. He scored two goals in five games before he was ruled of action with a muscle injury. He returned to fitness ahead of schedule and was named as man of the match in the game that secured promotion for the club on 26 April, also scoring the second goal in the 2–0 victory at AFC Wimbledon to earn himself a place on the EFL Team of the Week and the third-highest rating in League Two for that week.

Headley was sent off 32 minutes into the opening game of the 2025–26 season after committing a reckless challenge on Rotherham United striker Sam Nombe. He returned to the first XI and scored the winning goal against Championship club Birmingham City in the second round of the EFL Cup on 26 August. Speaking in March 2026, new manager Jon Brady said he was "really pleased" at the way Headley had played in the absence of left-back Liam Gordon. Headley played 19 league games in the season, which culminated in relegation.

He was named on the EFL Team of the Week after scoring a brace and creating three further chances in a 4–2 win over Accrington Stanley on 14 November 2026, only being denied a hat-trick after he had a shot cleared off the line.

== Style of play ==
Headley is primarily a left-sided wing-back or full-back who can also play as a winger and defensive midfielder. He has strength and pace and likes to quickly cut inside from out wide. He has a powerful, though not particularly accurate shot.

== Career statistics ==
As of match played 21 November 2026

Appearances and goals by club, season and competition
Club	Season	League			FA Cup		EFL Cup		Other		Total	
Club	Season	Division	Apps	Goals	Apps	Goals	Apps	Goals	Apps	Goals	Apps	Goals
Huddersfield Town	2019–20	Championship	0	0	0	0	0	0	—		0	0
Huddersfield Town	2020–21	Championship	0	0	0	0	0	0	—		0	0
Huddersfield Town	2021–22	Championship	0	0	0	0	0	0	—		0	0
Huddersfield Town	2022–23	Championship	11	1	0	0	0	0	—		11	1
Huddersfield Town	2023–24	Championship	29	1	0	0	1	0	—		30	1
Huddersfield Town	2024–25	League One	7	0	1	0	2	1	3 (Note: Appearances in EFL Trophy)	0	13	1
Huddersfield Town	Total		47	2	1	0	3	1	3	0	54	3
Bradford (Park Avenue) (loan)	2019–20	National League North	5	1	0	0	—		0	0	5	1
Hyde United (loan)	2019–20	Northern Premier League; Premier Division	3	0	0	0	—		1 (Note: Appearance in Cheshire Senior Cup)	0	4	0
Welling United (loan)	2020–21	National League South	2	0	0	0	—		0	0	2	0
Yeovil Town (loan)	2021–22	National League	0	0	—		—		1 (Note: Appearance in FA Trophy)	0	1	0
Harrogate Town (loan)	2022–23	League Two	20	2	2	0	1	0	2	0	25	2
Port Vale	2024–25	League Two	8	3	—		—		0	0	8	3
Port Vale	2025–26	League One	27	1	4	0	2	1	5	0	38	2
Port Vale	2026–27	League Two	13	2	1	0	1	0	3	0	18	2
Port Vale	Total		48	6	5	0	3	1	8	0	64	7
Career total			125	11	8	0	7	2	15	0	155	13
