= Tom Adeyemi =

English footballer

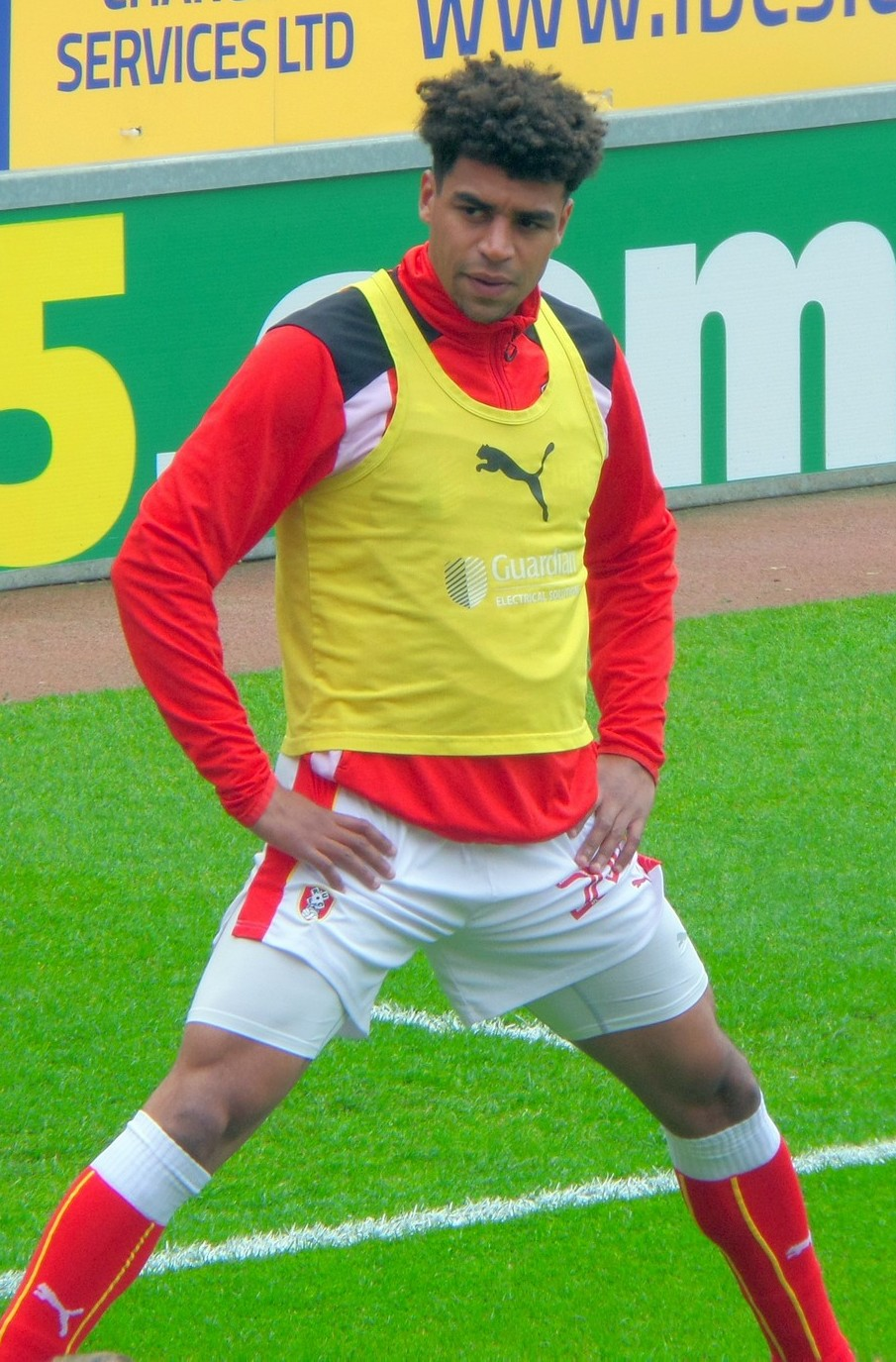
- Adeyemi warming up for Rotherham United in May 2017

Personal information
- Full name: Thomas Oluseun Adeyemi
- Date of birth: 24 October 1991 (age 35)
- Place of birth: Milton Keynes, England
- Height: 6 ft 1 in (1.85 m)
- Position: Midfielder

Youth career
- 2000–2008: Norwich City

Senior career*
Years	Team	Apps	(Gls)
2008–2013	Norwich City	11	(0)
2010–2011	→ Bradford City (loan)	34	(5)
2011–2012	→ Oldham Athletic (loan)	36	(2)
2012–2013	→ Brentford (loan)	30	(2)
2013–2014	Birmingham City	35	(1)
2014–2017	Cardiff City	20	(1)
2015–2016	→ Leeds United (loan)	23	(2)
2016–2017	→ Rotherham United (loan)	29	(6)
2017–2019	Ipswich Town	5	(0)
Total		223	(19)
- * Club domestic league appearances and goals

Thomas Oluseun Adeyemi (born 24 October 1991) is an English former professional footballer who played as a midfielder.

Adeyemi started his professional career at Championship club Norwich City in 2008, having progressed through the club's youth ranks, and made his professional debut for the club in 2009. During his five-year spell at the club as a professional, he made eleven league appearances. He spent the 2010–11 season on loan to League Two club Bradford City, where he made 34 league appearances, and the next season on loan to Oldham Athletic of League One, making 36 league appearances. He was sent out on loan again for the 2012–13 season, this time to League One club Brentford, where he made 30 league appearances.

He joined Championship club Birmingham City in July 2013 on a free transfer, having been released by Norwich, and a year later moved again, to fellow Championship club Cardiff City. After struggling to establish himself in the first team, he spent time on loan with Leeds United and Rotherham United before being released and joining Ipswich Town.

== Early life ==
Adeyemi was born in Milton Keynes, moving to Norwich with his family at the age of five after his father started a job in the area. He attended Norwich School. He declined a university offer from the University of Cambridge to pursue his footballing career, subsequently gaining A* grades at Advanced Level in Biology and Chemistry and an A grade in Mathematics.

== Club career ==
=== Norwich City ===
Adeyemi began his career with Norwich City, joining the club's youth system at the age of nine. He grew up supporting the club and was a season ticket holder alongside his father and grandfather before joining the playing staff. Having progressed through the youth ranks, he signed his first professional contract in November 2008 and made his debut for Norwich's first team on 8 August 2009, as a substitute for Matthew Gill during their heavy 7–1 defeat to Colchester United on the opening day of the 2009–10 season. Three days later, he was handed his first start in a 4–0 victory over Yeovil Town in the League Cup.

Manager Glenn Roeder, who gave him his professional contract, described him:

"He's very athletic, technically very gifted and one of the nicest young men that I've ever dealt with. He comes from a lovely family, and academically he's incredibly intelligent – I don't think he got anything less than an A grade in his GCSEs. My son goes to the same school and the headmaster told me if Tom decides at any point he doesn't want to play football he can go back to Norwich School, get his A levels and end up at Oxford or Cambridge, and I don't think he means their football teams!"

In March 2010, Adeyemi was named League One Apprentice of the Year at the Football League Awards. He made seventeen appearances for Norwich during his first season, helping the club win promotion to the Championship, and was rewarded with a new contract set to run until 2012. In July 2010, following Norwich City's promotion to the Championship, Adeyemi joined League Two club Bradford City on an initial six-month loan deal, later extended to a full season loan. He scored on his debut in a 3–1 loss against Shrewsbury Town. He featured heavily for the club, making 34 league appearances, as they endured a difficult season, finishing 18th.

==== Oldham Athletic (loan) ====
Adeyemi signed for League One club Oldham Athletic on a five-month loan deal in August 2011. Adeyemi made his debut for the club in a 1–1 draw with local rivals Huddersfield Town. He scored his first goal for Oldham against Milton Keynes Dons in a 2–1 win. During Oldham's FA Cup third round tie against Liverpool at Anfield, Adeyemi claimed he was the target of racist abuse from an individual in the stands. With ten minutes of the match remaining, he became involved in an altercation with fans after the alleged incident and was restrained by the match referee and teammates. An arrest was made, but the Crown Prosecution Service found "insufficient evidence to bring any criminal charges".

His loan deal was extended by a further month in January 2012 and extended again in February. On 11 April 2012, at the end of Adeyemi's loan deal, Oldham decided not to extend his deal until the end of the season and allowed him to return to parent club Norwich City. He made 45 appearances and scored three goals. Adeyemi stated that he was open to the possibility of a permanent move to Oldham.

==== Brentford (loan) ====
He joined League One club Brentford on a six-month loan deal on 29 August 2012, signed by Uwe Rösler. Adeyemi impressed in the centre of midfield and extended his loan until the end of the season. He played in the dramatic final match of the regular season, against Doncaster Rovers, in which Brentford's Marcello Trotta missed a last-minute penalty which would have earned Brentford automatic promotion, only for Doncaster to run up to the opposite end of the pitch and score a winner. Brentford entered the play-offs, in which they beat Swindon Town in the semi-final only for Adeyemi to be on the losing team in the final, beaten 2–1 by Yeovil Town. Towards the end of the season, Adeyemi stated his desire to return to Brentford on loan for the 2013–14 season.

=== Birmingham City ===
On 24 June 2013, following his release from Norwich, Adeyemi signed a two-year contract with Championship club Birmingham City. Manager Lee Clark described him as "a terrific young lad who is a powerful and athletic midfield player who can get forward and score goals." He made his debut in a 1–0 defeat at home to Watford on 3 August, and remained a regular member of the starting eleven. He scored the winning penalty during a shootout, albeit off the crossbar and the goalkeeper's back, to defeat Yeovil Town in the second round of the League Cup, and scored his first goal in the third round as Birmingham beat holders Swansea City 3–1. He stole the ball on the edge of Swansea's penalty area and knocked it to Chris Burke; Burke's return pass left Adeyemi a tap-in.

In the latter part of 2013, Birmingham went ten games unbeaten with a team built around a "spine" of Adeyemi and loanees Kyle Bartley, Dan Burn and Jesse Lingard, but the loanees were recalled, Adeyemi suffered a back injury which appeared to restrict his physicality when he was fit to play, and the team struggled. He was able to produce a strong performance on the final day of the season, when Birmingham avoided relegation on goal difference. He was chosen as the club's young player of the season, and felt that his increasing maturity was allowing him to take on more responsibility. Ahead of the 2014–15 season, Clark appointed Adeyemi vice-captain. Ten days later, amid interest from Cardiff City, he submitted a transfer request. Birmingham manager Clark called losing Adeyemi "gutting".

=== Cardiff City ===
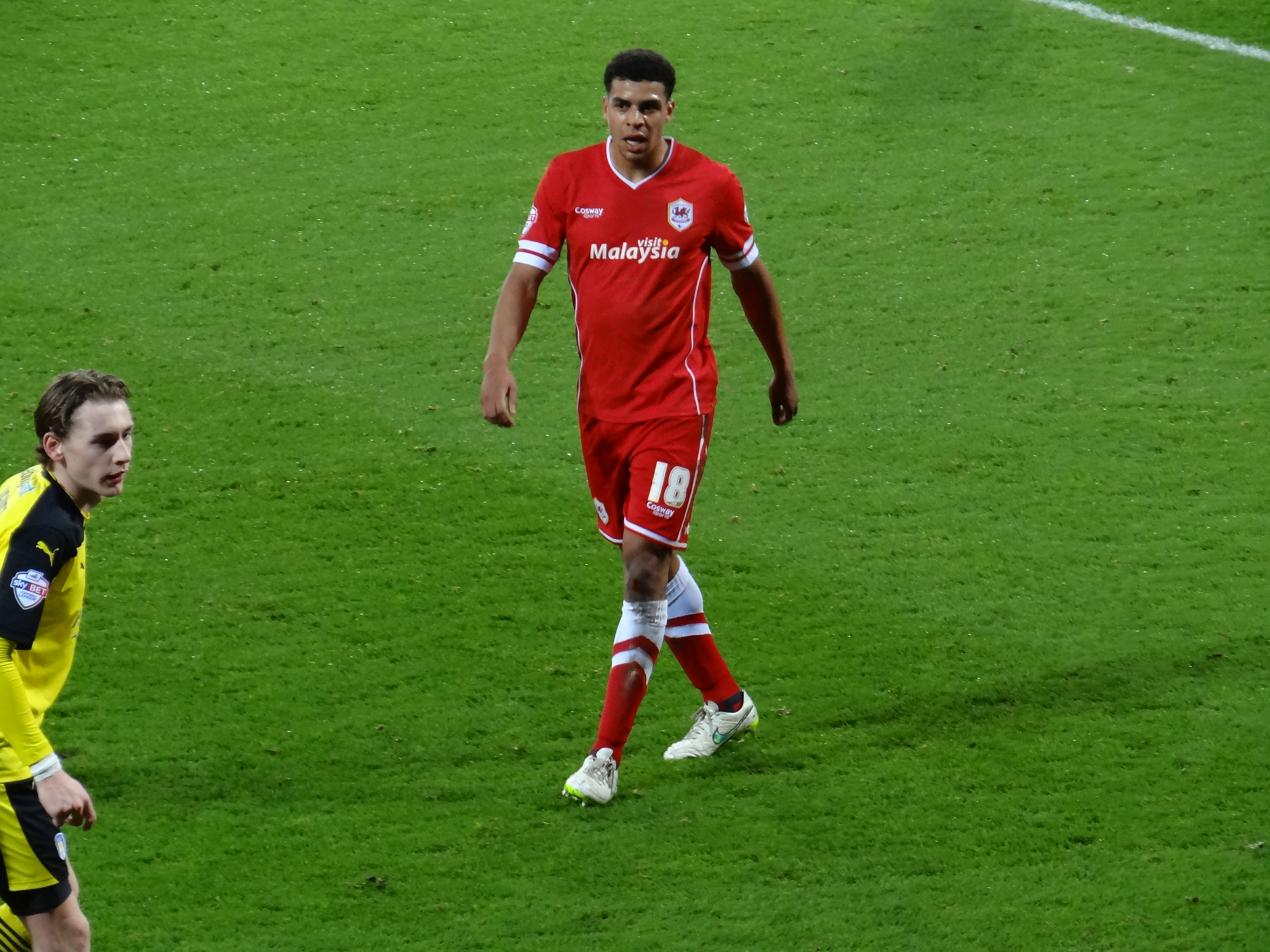
Adeyemi playing for Cardiff City in 2015

Adeyemi signed a three-year contract with Championship club Cardiff City, managed by Ole Gunnar Solskjær, on 7 August 2014. The fee was undisclosed, but reported in the Birmingham Mail as "in excess of £1 million, with add-ons [and] a sell-on clause". Solskjær later revealed that he followed Adeyemi's career for several years after spotting him playing for Norwich's youth team.

On 26 December, Adeyemi scored his first goal for Cardiff with a header that earned his team a point in a 1–1 draw with Charlton Athletic. On 20 January 2015, he received the man of the match award in a 2–1 defeat against Middlesbrough. However, he fell out of favour following Solskjær's dismissal and struggled to establish himself in the first team under new boss Russell Slade, making just ten starts for Cardiff.

==== Leeds United (loan) ====
On 14 July 2015, Adeyemi joined Championship rivals Leeds United on a season-long loan with the option of a permanent deal, which would potentially be worth £1m. The move to Leeds saw Adeyemi link up with his former Brentford manager Uwe Rösler. Adeyemi made his debut for Leeds in a 1–1 draw with Burnley on the opening day of the season. On 29 August, he scored his first competitive goal for Leeds with a header in the first half of the 2–1 win over Derby County. Having featured regularly during the first half of the season, he struggled for playing time following the appointment of Steve Evans as manager. He made only two late substitute appearances in January, which led Evans to deny speculation that the loan spell could be terminated early and Adeyemi expressed a desire to fight for his place. However, he made only three further appearances during the season and, at the end of the season, Leeds rejected to take up their option to sign him on a permanent basis.

==== Rotherham United (loan) ====
On 18 August 2016, Adeyemi joined Championship club Rotherham United on a season-long loan, making his debut two days later in a 1–0 victory over Brentford in the club's first league win of the season.

Following the appointment of Paul Warne as manager, Adeyemi enjoyed an upturn in form, netting his first goal for the club in Warne's first match on 3 December 2016 during a 2–1 defeat to Burton Albion. Having not scored prior, Adeyemi went on to score a further six goals in twenty appearances under Warne and, at the end of the season, he was named Rotherham's Player of Year as the club suffered relegation to League One. With Adeyemi's contract with Cardiff coming to an end, he attracted interest from several clubs and Rotherham manager Warne confirmed that the club had offered him a "brilliant deal" but expected the bid to be rejected due to Adeyemi's desire to remain in the Championship.

=== Ipswich Town ===
Adeyemi moved to Ipswich Town on 30 June 2017, signing a two-year contract after rejecting offers from several other clubs. His debut for the club was delayed after he contracted an illness soon after his arrival, followed by a calf strain on his return to training. He eventually made his first appearance for the club as a substitute in place of Flynn Downes during a 2–1 defeat to Queens Park Rangers. After making four further appearances, Adeyemi struggled to return to fitness for the club, being ruled out until January with a hamstring injury. On his comeback from his initial injury, he suffered a further blow after lasting just 32 minutes of an under-23 fixture. After three further months out, Ipswich manager Mick McCarthy confirmed that Adeyemi would miss the remainder of the 2017–18 season, having made only five appearances throughout the year.

During the club's preseason training the following season, Adeyemi suffered further injury problems after damaging his achilles. Newly appointed Ipswich manager Paul Hurst expressed his frustration over Adeyemi's injuries but claimed that it was time to "grit his teeth", also stating "There's obviously something (an injury) there but there's another player in the squad that has something very similar who has trained every day. [...] We all have different pain thresholds but I'm wanting people I can rely on and go to war with." However, Adeyemi failed to make an appearance for the club during the 2018–19 season. He was released by the club at the end of the season following the expiration of his contract and retired shortly afterwards.

== International career ==
The son of a Nigerian father, Adeyemi was eligible for both the Nigeria and England national teams. He has previously represented England at under-17 level.

== Style of play ==
Adeyemi was described by Birmingham manager Lee Clark as a "powerful and talented midfielder". Rösler assessed him as composed. Solskjær expected him to be "a top, top player" for Cardiff, as "a box to box midfielder [who] can attack and defend. He wins the ball really well for us, switches the play and scores goals as well".

Adeyemi described his own playing style by stating "With my size, I bring a physical presence. I can break up play and I like to think, as all players do, that I can play a bit too. I think I'm quite an all-round midfielder in how I can impact a game."

== Career statistics ==
Appearances and goals by club, season and competition
Club	Season	League			FA Cup		League Cup		Other		Total	
Club	Season	Division	Apps	Goals	Apps	Goals	Apps	Goals	Apps	Goals	Apps	Goals
Norwich City	2009–10	League One	11	0	0	0	2	0	4 (Note: Appearances in Football League Trophy)	0	17	0
Norwich City	2011–12	Premier League	0	0	—		0	0	—		0	0
Norwich City	2012–13	Premier League	0	0	—		0	0	—		0	0
Norwich City	Total		11	0	0	0	2	0	4	0	17	0
Bradford City (loan)	2010–11	League Two	34	5	1	0	1	0	1	0	37	5
Oldham Athletic (loan)	2011–12	League One	36	2	4	0	—		5	1	45	3
Brentford (loan)	2012–13	League One	30	2	5	1	—		4 (Note: One appearance in Football League Trophy, three in League One play-offs)	0	39	3
Birmingham City	2013–14	Championship	35	1	1	0	4	2	—		40	3
Cardiff City	2014–15	Championship	20	1	2	0	1	0	—		23	1
Leeds United (loan)	2015–16	Championship	23	2	1	0	0	0	—		24	2
Rotherham United (loan)	2016–17	Championship	29	6	1	1	0	0	—		30	7
Ipswich Town	2017–18	Championship	5	0	0	0	0	0	—		5	0
Ipswich Town	2018–19	Championship	0	0	0	0	0	0	—		0	0
Ipswich Town	Total		5	0	0	0	0	0	0	0	5	0
Career total			223	19	15	2	8	2	14	1	260	24

== Honours ==
=== Club ===
Norwich City

- Football League One: 2009–10

=== Individual ===
- Birmingham City Young Player of the Year: 2013–14
- Football League One Apprentice of the Year: 2009–10
