= Michał Helik =

Polish footballer (born 1995)

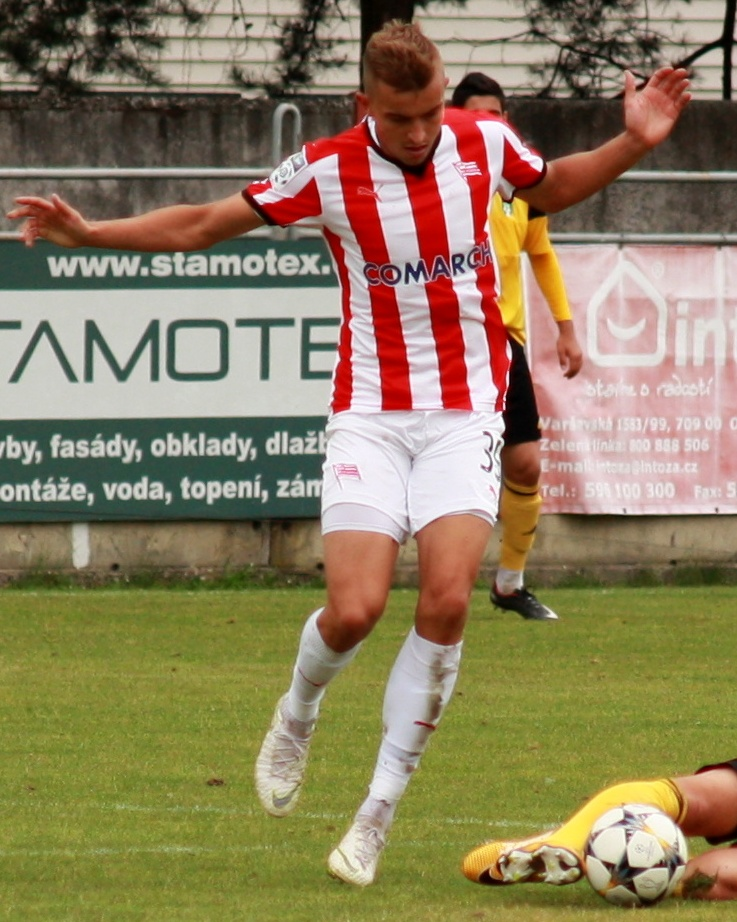
- Helik in 2018 playing for Cracovia

Personal information
- Full name: Michał Sławomir Helik
- Date of birth: 9 September 1995 (age 31)
- Place of birth: Chorzów, Poland
- Height: 1.91 m (6 ft 3 in)
- Position: Centre-back

Team information
- Current team: Oxford United
- Number: 6

Youth career
- –2013: Ruch Chorzów

Senior career*
Years	Team	Apps	(Gls)
2013–2017	Ruch Chorzów	46	(1)
2017–2020	Cracovia	88	(9)
2020–2022	Barnsley	81	(6)
2022–2025	Huddersfield Town	94	(13)
2025–	Oxford United	70	(7)

International career
2021	Poland	7	(0)
- * Club domestic league appearances and goals as of 23:09, 20 October 2026 (UTC)

Michał Sławomir Helik (born 9 September 1995) is a Polish professional footballer who plays as a centre-back for EFL League One club Oxford United.

== Club career ==
Born in Chorzów, Helik started his career at Ruch Chorzów where he made 46 Ekstraklasa appearances and scored one goal. On 9 June 2017, it was announced that Helik would join fellow Ekstraklasa side Cracovia on a contract valid from 1 July. Over three seasons at Cracovia, he appeared in 88 league matches and scored nine goals.

On 9 September 2020, Helik joined Championship club Barnsley on a three-year deal for an undisclosed fee. He scored his first goal for Barnsley in a 2–2 draw with Bristol City on 17 October 2020.

On 1 September 2022, Helik signed for Championship side Huddersfield Town for an undisclosed fee on a three-year deal, with an optional fourth year.

After Huddersfield's relegation at the end of the 2023–24 season, Helik remained with the club for another half-a-year, before returning to the second tier on 17 January 2025 to join Oxford United for an undisclosed fee.

== International career ==
Helik was selected by coach Paulo Sousa for the Poland squad for UEFA Euro 2020, but didn't play in the tournament. He later made his debut in a 3–3 draw against Hungary in a 2022 FIFA World Cup qualification match on 25 March 2021.

== Career statistics ==
=== Club ===
As of match played 2 May 2026

Appearances and goals by club, season and competition
Club	Season	League			National cup (Note: Includes Polish Cup, FA Cup)		League cup (Note: Includes EFL Cup)		Europe		Other		Total	
Club	Season	Division	Apps	Goals	Apps	Goals	Apps	Goals	Apps	Goals	Apps	Goals	Apps	Goals
Ruch Chorzów	2013–14	Ekstraklasa	8	0	0	0	—		—		—		8	0
Ruch Chorzów	2014–15	Ekstraklasa	18	1	0	0	—		4 (Note: Appearances in UEFA Europa League)	0	—		22	1
Ruch Chorzów	2015–16	Ekstraklasa	0	0	0	0	—		—		—		0	0
Ruch Chorzów	2016–17	Ekstraklasa	20	0	0	0	—		—		—		20	0
Ruch Chorzów	Total		46	1	0	0	—		4	0	—		50	1
Cracovia	2017–18	Ekstraklasa	32	8	2	0	—		—		—		34	8
Cracovia	2018–19	Ekstraklasa	32	0	2	1	—		—		—		34	1
Cracovia	2019–20	Ekstraklasa	23	1	5	1	—		2	0	—		30	2
Cracovia	2020–21	Ekstraklasa	1	0	1	0	—		1	0	0	0	3	0
Cracovia	Total		88	9	10	2	—		3	0	—		101	11
Barnsley	2020–21	Championship	43	5	3	1	1	0	—		2 (Note: Appearances in Championship play-offs)	0	49	6
Barnsley	2021–22	Championship	38	1	1	0	1	0	—		—		40	1
Barnsley	Total		81	6	4	1	2	0	—		2	0	89	7
Huddersfield Town	2022–23	Championship	36	2	1	0	0	0	—		—		37	2
Huddersfield Town	2023–24	Championship	41	9	1	0	0	0	—		—		42	9
Huddersfield Town	2024–25	League One	17	2	0	0	2	0	—		2 (Note: Appearances in EFL Trophy)	0	21	2
Huddersfield Town	Total		94	13	2	0	2	0	—		2	0	100	13
Oxford United	2024–25	Championship	20	5	—		—		—		—		20	5
Oxford United	2025–26	Championship	43	1	1	0	1	0	—		—		45	1
Oxford United	Total		63	6	1	0	1	0	—		—		65	6
Career total			372	35	17	3	5	0	7	0	4	0	405	38

=== International ===
Appearances and goals by national team and year
National team	Year	Apps	Goals
Poland	2021	7	0
Total		7	0

== Honours ==
Cracovia

- Polish Cup: 2019–20

Individual

- Ekstraklasa Defender of the Season: 2017–18
- Barnsley Player of the Season: 2020–21
- Huddersfield Town Player of the Year: 2022–23, 2023–24
