= 2016–17 Rotherham United F.C. season =

Rotherham United
2016–17 season
- Chairman: Tony Stewart
- Manager: Alan Stubbs (Until 19 October); Kenny Jackett (21 October – 28 November); Paul Warne (Interim Manager, from 28 November. Permanent Manager, from 1 April)
- Stadium: AESSEAL New York Stadium
- Championship: 24th (relegated)
- FA Cup: Third round (eliminated by Oxford United)
- EFL Cup: First round (eliminated by Morecambe)
- Top goalscorer: League: Danny Ward (11); All: Danny Ward (12)
- Highest home attendance: 11,653
- Lowest home attendance: 3,793
- Average home league attendance: 9,348
Home colours	Away colours	Third colours

The 2016–17 season was Rotherham United's 92nd season in their existence and their third consecutive season in the Championship. In the previous season, Rotherham secured their place in the championship with a 21st-placed finish, 9 points above the relegation zone. Along with competing in the Championship, the club also participated in the FA Cup, in which they entered in the third round, and the EFL Cup.

== Key events ==
On 1 June 2016, Rotherham appointed Alan Stubbs as manager, with John Doolan joining him as assistant manager. Both signed three-year contracts with the Millers. Two days later, the club announced the departure of first team coach Nicky Eaden.

On 30 June 2016, Andy Holden was appointed as first team coach. Holden had previously worked with Stubbs at Hibernian.

On 19 October 2016 the club announced the departure of Stubbs, Doolan and Holden with immediate effect.

Kenny Jackett was named manager on 21 October 2016, signing a three-year deal. On 28 November 39 days later and after only 5 games in charge, he resigned. Paul Warne took over as interim manager.

On 12 January 2017, the club changed goalkeeping coach, with Andy Dibble leaving for Cardiff and Mike Pollitt returning to the club for a third time to replace him.

Rotherham became the first side in the top six tiers of English football to be relegated in the 2016–17 season on 1 April, after losing 1–0 at home to Fulham.

On 5 April 2017, the club formally appointed Paul Warne as manager, on a one-year rolling contract.

== Squad statistics ==
=== Player statistics ===
As of end of season.

Players with zero appearances have been unused substitutes in one or more games.

No.	Pos.	Nat.	Name	Total		Championship		FA Cup		EFL Cup		Discipline	
No.	Pos.	Nat.	Name	Apps	Goals	Apps	Goals	Apps	Goals	Apps	Goals	Yellow card	Red card
1	GK	(England)	Lee Camp	18	0	18	0	0	0	0	0	1	0
12	GK	(Wales)	Lewis Price	18+1	0	16+1	0	1	0	1	0	2	0
18	GK	(England)	Richard O'Donnell	12	0	12	0	0	0	0	0	0	0
45	GK	(England)	Laurence Bilboe	0	0	0	0	0	0	0	0	0	0
46	GK	(England)	George McMahon	0	0	0	0	0	0	0	0	0	0
2	DF	(Republic of Ireland)	Stephen Kelly	16+4	0	16+4	0	0	0	0	0	4	0
3	DF	(England)	Joe Mattock	34+3	0	33+3	0	1	0	0	0	13	0
5	DF	(Scotland)	Kirk Broadfoot	4	0	3	0	1	0	0	0	0	0
6	DF	(England)	Richard Wood	29+2	2	28+1	2	1	0	0+1	0	3	1
14	DF	(England)	Dominic Ball	12+1	0	12+1	0	0	0	0	0	2	0
15	DF	(Nigeria)	Semi Ajayi	17	1	17	1	0	0	0	0	0	0
16	DF	(England)	Kelvin Wilson	9	0	8	0	0	0	1	0	0	0
17	DF	(England)	Darnell Fisher	34+1	0	33+1	0	1	0	0	0	9	1
23	DF	(England)	Tom Thorpe	1+2	0	0+2	0	0	0	1	0	0	0
26	DF	(Tunisia)	Aymen Belaïd	14+3	2	14+3	2	0	0	0	0	4	0
29	DF	(Sweden)	Joel Ekstrand	1	0	1	0	0	0	0	0	0	0
30	DF	(England)	Ben Purrington	7+3	0	7+3	0	0	0	0	0	1	0
40	DF	(England)	Mason Warren	1	0	0	0	0	0	1	0	0	0
44	DF	(England)	Fabian Bailey	0	0	0	0	0	0	0	0	0	0
4	MF	(England)	Will Vaulks	33+9	1	31+9	1	1	0	1	0	9	0
7	MF	(Republic of Ireland)	Anthony Forde	21+13	3	20+12	2	1	0	0+1	1	2	0
8	MF	(Republic of Ireland)	Lee Frecklington	18+4	1	18+4	1	0	0	0	0	5	0
11	MF	(England)	Jon Taylor	36+7	4	35+7	4	0	0	1	0	2	0
21	MF	(Scotland)	Scott Allan	5+6	0	4+6	0	0	0	1	0	1	0
22	MF	(England)	Joe Newell	29+6	2	28+6	2	1	0	0	0	3	0
24	MF	(England)	Tom Adeyemi	29+1	7	28+1	6	1	1	0	0	3	0
27	MF	(Wales)	Alex Bray	0+5	0	0+5	0	0	0	0	0	1	0
33	MF	(England)	Richard Smallwood	21+5	1	20+5	1	0	0	1	0	4	0
42	MF	(England)	Darnelle Bailey-King	0+1	0	0+1	0	0	0	0	0	0	0
9	FW	(England)	Danny Ward	41+2	12	40+1	11	1	1	0+1	0	4	0
10	FW	(England)	Carlton Morris	6+2	0	6+2	0	0	0	0	0	0	0
19	FW	(England)	Jonson Clarke-Harris	2+5	0	2+5	0	0	0	0	0	0	0
20	FW	(Antigua and Barbuda)	Dexter Blackstock	5+12	1	4+12	1	1	0	0	0	2	0
39	FW	(England)	Jerry Yates	8+15	3	7+14	1	0+1	0	1	2	0	0
41	FW	(England)	Kuda Muskwe	0	0	0	0	0	0	0	0	0	0
Players played for Rotherham this season on loan who returned to their parent club during the season:
18	DF	(England)	Dael Fry	10	0	10	0	0	0	0	0	0	0
10	MF	(England)	Jake Forster-Caskey	6+1	0	5+1	0	0	0	1	0	0	0
37	FW	(England)	Isaiah Brown	17+3	3	17+3	3	0	0	0	0	3	0
Players played for Rotherham this season who have left the club:
15	DF	(England)	Greg Halford	11+4	1	10+4	0	0	0	1	1	2	0
13	FW	(Nigeria)	Peter Odemwingie	3+4	0	3+4	0	0	0	0	0	1	1

=== Goalscorers ===
As of end of season.

Place	Position	Nation	Number	Name	Total	Championship	FA Cup	EFL Cup
1	FW	(England)	9	Danny Ward	12	11	1	0
2	MF	(England)	24	Tom Adeyemi	7	6	1	0
3	MF	(England)	11	Jon Taylor	4	4	0	0
4	MF	(Republic of Ireland)	7	Anthony Forde	3	2	0	1
=	FW	(England)	37	Isaiah Brown	3	3	0	0
=	FW	(England)	39	Jerry Yates	3	0	0	3
7	DF	(England)	6	Richard Wood	2	2	0	0
=	MF	(England)	22	Joe Newell	2	2	0	0
=	DF	(Tunisia)	26	Aymen Belaïd	2	2	0	0
10	MF	(England)	4	Will Vaulks	1	1	0	0
=	MF	(England)	8	Lee Frecklington	1	1	0	0
=	DF	(England)	15	Greg Halford	1	0	0	1
=	DF	(Nigeria)	15	Semi Ajayi	1	0	0	1
=	FW	(Antigua and Barbuda)	20	Dexter Blackstock	1	1	0	0
=	MF	(England)	33	Richard Smallwood	1	1	0	0

== Pre-season friendlies ==
9 July 2016 Friendly	Parkgate	0–7	Rotherham United	Parkgate, Rotherham
12:00 BST		Report	Broadfoot 42'; Trialist 53'; 69' (o.g.); Ward 73', 84', 90'; Yates 75'	Stadium: Roundwood Sports Complex

12 July 2015 Friendly	Rotherham United	2–1	Miedź Legnica	Opalenica, Poland
18:00 CEST	Yates 54' (pen.); Smallwood 75'	Report	Batin 32'	Stadium: Hotel Remes Sport & Spa

15 July 2015 Friendly	Rotherham United	0–0	Górnik Zabrze	Opalenica, Poland
18:00 CEST		Report		Stadium: Hotel Remes Sport & Spa

23 July 2016 Friendly	Rotherham United	1–2	Sunderland	Rotherham
15:00 BST	Yates 46'	Report	Borini 27'; N'Zogbia 84'	Stadium: AESSEAL New York Stadium; Attendance: 6,676 (2,979); Referee: Craig Pawson

26 July 2016 Friendly	Scunthorpe United	2–1	Rotherham United	Scunthorpe
19:30 BST	Adelakun 17'; Morris 86'		Wood 23'	Stadium: Glanford Park; Attendance: 1,466; Referee: D Drysdale

== Competitions ==
=== Championship ===
==== League table ====
Pos	Team	Pld	W	D	L	GF	GA	GD	Pts	Promotion, qualification or relegation
20	Burton Albion	46	13	13	20	49	63	−14	52	
21	Nottingham Forest	46	14	9	23	62	72	−10	51	
22	Blackburn Rovers (R)	46	12	15	19	53	65	−12	51	Relegation to EFL League One
23	Wigan Athletic (R)	46	10	12	24	40	57	−17	42	Relegation to EFL League One
24	Rotherham United (R)	46	5	8	33	40	98	−58	23	Relegation to EFL League One

Source: English Football League, Soccerway
Rules for classification: 1) Points; 2) Goal difference; 3) Number of goals scored; 4) Points in head-to-head matches; 5) Goal difference in head-to-head matches; 6) Goals scored in head-to-head matches; 7) Play-off.
(R) Relegated

==== Results summary ====
Overall								Home						Away					
Pld	W	D	L	GF	GA	GD	Pts	W	D	L	GF	GA	GD	W	D	L	GF	GA	GD
46	5	8	33	40	98	−58	23	5	6	12	23	34	−11	0	2	21	17	64	−47

Last updated: 7 May 2017.

==== Matchday summary ====
Matchday	1	2	3	4	5	6	7	8	9	10	11	12	13	14	15	16	17	18	19	20	21	22	23	24	25	26	27	28	29	30	31	32	33	34	35	36	37	38	39	40	41	42	43	44	45	46
Ground	H	A	A	H	A	H	H	A	H	A	H	A	A	H	A	H	A	H	A	H	A	A	H	H	A	H	A	H	A	A	H	H	A	A	H	H	A	A	H	H	A	H	A	H	A	H
Result	D	L	L	W	L	D	D	L	L	L	L	L	L	L	D	L	L	L	L	W	L	L	W	L	L	W	L	L	L	L	D	L	L	L	L	L	L	L	L	L	L	D	L	W	D	D
Position	8	19	21	22	22	20	20	21	23	24	24	24	24	24	24	24	24	24	24	24	24	24	24	24	24	24	24	24	24	24	24	24	24	24	24	24	24	24	24	24	24	24	24	24	24	24

Updated to match(es) played on 7 May 2017. Source:
A = Away; H = Home; W = Win; D = Draw; L = Loss

==== Results ====
6 August 2016 1	Rotherham United	2–2	Wolverhampton Wanderers	Rotherham
15:00 BST	Ward 9'; Vaulks 20' (yellow card) 83'; Kelly (yellow card) 81'	Report	Saville 39' (yellow card) 63'; Iorfa (red card) 52'; Böðvarsson 65'	Stadium: AESSEAL New York Stadium; Attendance: 11,291 (2,567); Referee: Scott Duncan

13 August 2016 2	Aston Villa	3–0	Rotherham United	Birmingham
15:00 BST	Gestede 21', 45+3' (yellow card) 38'; Ayew (yellow card) 27'; McCormack (yellow card) 36'; Grealish 84' (yellow card) 84'	Report	Mattock (yellow card) 54'; Fisher (yellow card) 82'	Stadium: Villa Park; Attendance: 33,286; Referee: Keith Stroud

16 August 2016 3	Brighton & Hove Albion	3–0	Rotherham United	Falmer
19:45 BST	Knockaert 23'; Murray 26'; Dunk (yellow card) 48'; Hemed 58' (pen.)	Report	Kelly (yellow card) 57'; Ball (yellow card) 57'; Fisher (yellow card) 76'; Allan (yellow card) 84'	Stadium: Falmer Stadium; Attendance: 25,128; Referee: Simon Hooper

20 August 2016 4	Rotherham United	1–0	Brentford	Rotherham
15:00 BST	Ward 32'; Smallwood (yellow card) 70'	Report	Colin (yellow card) 75'	Stadium: AESSEAL New York Stadium; Attendance: 8,367 (459); Referee: James Adcock

27 August 2016 5	Barnsley	4–0	Rotherham United	Barnsley
15:00 BST	Roberts 54'; Scowen (yellow card) 55'; Hammill 57'; Bradshaw 86'; Kent 90+1'	Report	Newell (yellow card) 90+1'	Stadium: Oakwell; Attendance: 15,283 (3,293 away); Referee: Graham Scott

10 September 2016 6	Rotherham United	2–2	Bristol City	Rotherham
15:00 BST	Brown 6'; Flint 58' (o.g.); Camp (yellow card) 74'; Ward (yellow card) 90+1'	Report	Tomlin (yellow card) 36'; Abraham 74'; Reid 83'	Stadium: Aesseal New York Stadium; Attendance: 8,559 (708 away); Referee: Andrew Madley

14 September 2016 7	Rotherham United	2–2	Nottingham Forest	Rotherham
19:45 BST	Taylor 30', 87'; Fisher (yellow card) 74' (yellow-red card) 83'; Mattock (yellow card) 89'; Brown (yellow card) 89'	Report	Osborn (yellow card) 58'; Lansbury (yellow card) 64'; Mills 76'; Vellios 85'; Lichaj (yellow card) 90+6'	Stadium: Aesseal New York Stadium; Attendance: 10,243; Referee: Peter Bankes

17 September 2016 8	Blackburn Rovers	4–2	Rotherham United	Blackburn
15:00 BST	Conway 22'; Emnes 29'; Evans (yellow card) 41'; Marshall 46'; Gallagher 90+2'	Report	Ward 12', 83'; Mattock (yellow card) 58'; Brown (yellow card) 66'; Adeyemi (yellow card) 70'; Kelly (yellow card) 90+1'	Stadium: Ewood Park; Attendance: 10,699 (734); Referee: Darren Bond

24 September 2016 9	Rotherham United	1–2	Cardiff City	Rotherham
15:00 BST	Brown 60'; Halford (yellow card) 81'	Report	O'Keefe (yellow card) 30'; Connolly (yellow card) 69'; Lambert 73', 79'	Stadium: Aesseal New York Stadium; Attendance: 8,348; Referee: David Coote

27 September 2016 10	Huddersfield Town	2–1	Rotherham United	Huddersfield
19:45 BST	Kachunga 2'; Wells 38'; Whitehead (yellow card) 43'; Scannell (yellow card) 53'; Payne (yellow card) 87'	Report	Ward 34'; Newell (yellow card) 68'	Stadium: The John Smith's Stadium; Attendance: 18,808; Referee: Stuart Attwell

1 October 2016 11	Rotherham United	0–1	Newcastle United	Rotherham
15:00 BST	Frecklington (yellow card) 37'; Ward (yellow card) 58'	Report	Atsu 41'; Diamé (yellow card) 81'	Stadium: AESSEAL New York Stadium; Attendance: 11,653; Referee: Roger East

15 October 2016 12	Norwich City	3–1	Rotherham United	Norwich
15:00 BST	Hoolahan 17'; Jerome 65'; Naismith 89'	Match Report	Blackstock 74'; Brown (yellow card) 82'	Stadium: Carrow Road; Attendance: 26,813; Referee: James Adcock

18 October 2016 13	Birmingham City	4–2	Rotherham United	Birmingham
19:45 BST	Morrison 15'; Jutkiewicz 35'; Maghoma 43' (yellow card) 80'; Cotterill 84' (pen.)	Report	Ward 31'; Fisher (yellow card) 54'; Taylor 56'; Ball (yellow card) 77'	Stadium: St Andrew's; Attendance: 16,404; Referee: Christopher Kavanagh

22 October 2016 14	Rotherham United	0–1	Reading	Rotherham
15:00 BST	Blackstock (yellow card) 52'; Halford (yellow card) 69'	Report	Gunter (yellow card) 52'; McCleary (penalty missed) 60'; McShane 86'; Swift (yellow card) 89'	Stadium: AESSEAL New York Stadium; Attendance: 8,800; Referee: Scott Duncan

29 October 2016 15	Ipswich Town	2–2	Rotherham United	Ipswich
15:00 BST	Sears 3'; McGoldrick 90+5'	Report	Ward 7', 48'	Stadium: Portman Road; Attendance: 15,247; Referee: Darren Bond

5 November 2016 16	Rotherham United	1–3	Preston North End	Rotherham
15:00 GMT	Wood 71'	Report	Hugill 22'; Robinson 27'; Johnson (yellow card) 55'; Vermijl 81'	Stadium: AESSEAL New York Stadium; Attendance: 10,013; Referee: Andy Woolmer

19 November 2016 17	Derby County	3–0	Rotherham United	Derby
15:00 GMT	Ince (penalty missed) 15', 67', 15', 63'; Bent 19'	Report	Adeyemi (yellow card) 55'; Odemwingie (yellow card) 79'	Stadium: iPro Stadium; Attendance: 28,191; Referee: Oliver Langford

26 November 2016 18	Rotherham United	1–2	Leeds United	Rotherham
17:30 GMT	Odemwingie (red card) 29'; Wood 86'	Report	Wood 14'; Doukara 45+7'; O'Kane (yellow card) 54'; Green (yellow card) 90+2'	Stadium: AESSEAL New York Stadium; Attendance: 10,513; Referee: Stuart Atwell

3 December 2016 19	Burton Albion	2–1	Rotherham United	Burton-upon-Trent
15:00 GMT	Irvine 15'; Naylor (yellow card) 59'; Palmer 62'	Report	Vaulks (yellow card) 70'; Adeyemi 90+4'	Stadium: Pirelli Stadium; Attendance: 4,446; Referee: Christopher Kavanagh

10 December 2016 20	Rotherham United	1–0	Queens Park Rangers	Rotherham
15:00 GMT	Brown 24'; Adeyemi (yellow card) 50'; Frecklington (yellow card) 83'; Forde (yellow card) 87'	Report	Ngbakoto (yellow card) 45+3'; Luongo (yellow card) 48'; Polter (yellow card) 73'	Stadium: AESSEAL New York Stadium; Attendance: 8,704; Referee: Jeremy Simpson

13 December 2016 21	Fulham	2–1	Rotherham United	Fulham, London
19:45 GMT	Johansen 32'; Ayité 54'; Martin (penalty missed) 67'	Report	Newell 19'; Wood (yellow card) 90+1'	Stadium: Craven Cottage; Attendance: 13,735; Referee: Steve Martin

18 December 2016 22	Sheffield Wednesday	1–0	Rotherham United	Sheffield
15:00 GMT	Fletcher (yellow card) 55' (goal) 90+4' (pen.)	Report	Fisher (yellow card) 86'; Wood (red card) 90+3'; Mattock (yellow card) 90+3'	Stadium: Hillsborough Stadium; Attendance: 27,242; Referee: Tim Robinson

26 December 2016 23	Rotherham United	3–2	Wigan Athletic	Rotherham
15:00 GMT	Belaïd 8' (yellow card) 36'; Mattock (yellow card) 20'; Ward (yellow card) 25' (goal) 32'; Fisher (yellow card) 45'; Burn 45+1' (o.g.)	Report	Davies (yellow card) 31'; Wildschut 51'; Gómez 79'; Jacobs (yellow card) 90+1'	Stadium: AESSEAL New York Stadium; Attendance: 10,158; Referee: David Coote

29 December 2016 24	Rotherham United	1–2	Burton Albion	Rotherham
19:45 GMT	Frecklington (yellow card) 33'; Adeyemi 45+3'; Ward (yellow card) 88'	Report	McFadzean (yellow card) 13'; O'Grady 36'; Irvine 41'; Palmer (yellow card) 75'; McCrory (yellow card) 77'; Barker (yellow card) 90+1'	Stadium: AESSEAL New York Stadium; Attendance: 9,806; Referee: Tony Harrington

2 January 2017 25	Leeds United	3–0	Rotherham United	Leeds
15:00 GMT	Bartley 47'; Jansson (yellow card) 57'; Wood 66', 79'	Report	Mattock (yellow card) 53'	Stadium: Elland Road; Attendance: 33,397; Referee: Steve Martin

14 January 2017 26	Rotherham United	2–1	Norwich City	Rotherham
15:00 GMT	Yates 7'; Wood (yellow card) 20'; Vaulks (yellow card) 41'; Adeyemi 55'; Price (yellow card) 88'	Report	Oliveira (red card) 18'; Hoolahan (yellow card) 30'; Naismith (yellow card) 44'; Jerome (yellow card) 49' (goal) 51'	Stadium: AESSEAL New York Stadium; Attendance: 10,000; Referee: Geoff Eltringham

21 January 2017 27	Newcastle United	4–0	Rotherham United	Newcastle upon Tyne
15:00 GMT	Murphy 45+3'; Ritchie 49', 77'; Pérez 59'	Report	Smallwood (yellow card) 45+2'	Stadium: St. James' Park; Attendance: 52,208; Referee: Jeremy Simpson

28 January 2017 28	Rotherham United	0–1	Barnsley	Rotherham
15:00 GMT	Mattock (yellow card) 16'	Report	Kent (yellow card) 25'; Armstrong 70'	Stadium: AESSEAL New York Stadium; Attendance: 11,050; Referee: Keith Stroud

31 January 2017 29	Nottingham Forest	2–0	Rotherham United	West Bridgford
19:45 GMT	Assombalonga 50' (pen.), 71'; Hobbs (yellow card) 90+1'	Report	Taylor (yellow card) 26'; Smallwood (yellow card) 36'; Vaulks (yellow card) 60'; Mattock (yellow card) 83'	Stadium: City Ground; Attendance: 15,570; Referee: Simon Hooper

4 February 2017 30	Bristol City	1–0	Rotherham United	Bristol
15:00 GMT	Đurić 73'; Cotterill (yellow card) 79'	Report	Vaulks (yellow card) 90+2'	Stadium: Ashton Gate Stadium; Attendance: 18,737; Referee: Peter Bankes

11 February 2017 31	Rotherham United	1–1	Blackburn Rovers	Rotherham
15:00 GMT	Kelly (yellow card) 44'; Taylor 47'	Report	Kelly 86' (o.g.); Mahoney (yellow card) 88'	Stadium: AESSEAL New York Stadium; Attendance: 9,438; Referee: Oliver Langford

14 February 2017 32	Rotherham United	2–3	Huddersfield Town	Rotherham
19:45 GMT	Ajayi 11'; Adeyemi 71'	Report	Lolley 19'; Kachunga 75'; Brown (yellow card) 79'; Smith 90+2'	Stadium: AESSEAL New York Stadium; Attendance: 10,114; Referee: Stuart Attwell

18 February 2017 33	Cardiff City	5–0	Rotherham United	Cardiff
15:00 GMT	Harris 11'; Hoilett 45+3'; Noone 49'; Zohore 54', 83'	Report	Forde (yellow card) 63'; Belaïd (yellow card) 81'	Stadium: Cardiff City Stadium; Attendance: 15,650; Referee: Jeremy Simpson

25 February 2017 34	Brentford	4–2	Rotherham United	Brentford, London
15:00 GMT	Jota 31', 90+2' (pen.), 90+5'; Yennaris (yellow card) 34' (goal) 78'	Report	Taylor (yellow card) 16'; Belaïd 67'; Forde 87'	Stadium: Griffin Park; Attendance: 9,918; Referee: Andy Davies

4 March 2017 35	Rotherham United	0–2	Aston Villa	Rotherham
15:00 GMT	Frecklington (yellow card) 49'; Belaïd (yellow card) 62'	Report	Vaulks 68' (o.g.); Kodjia 87'	Stadium: AESSEAL New York Stadium; Attendance: 10,720; Referee: Steve Martin

7 March 2017 36	Rotherham United	0–2	Brighton & Hove Albion	Rotherham
19:45 GMT	Vaulks (yellow card) 32'	Report	Knockaert 48'; March 79'	Stadium: AESSEAL New York Stadium; Attendance: 8,366; Referee: Geoff Eltringham

11 March 2017 37	Wolverhampton Wanderers	1–0	Rotherham United	Wolverhampton
15:00 GMT	Hélder Costa (penalty missed) 35'; Weimann 45+1' (yellow card) 45+3'	Report	Mattock (yellow card) 88'	Stadium: Molineux Stadium; Attendance: 20,077; Referee: Jeremy Simpson

18 March 2017 38	Queens Park Rangers	5–1	Rotherham United	Shepherd's Bush, London
15:00 GMT	Smith 5'; Freeman 15'; N'Gbakoto 49' (pen.); Luongo 57'; Onuoha 90+1'	Report	Newell 13'; Belaïd (yellow card) 48'	Stadium: Loftus Road; Attendance: 13,383; Referee: Oliver Langford

1 April 2017 39	Rotherham United	0–1	Fulham	Rotherham
15:00 BST	Purrington (yellow card) 82'	Report	Aluko 66'; Johansen (yellow card) 90'	Stadium: AESSEAL New York Stadium; Attendance: 9,004; Referee: Tim Robinson

4 April 2017 40	Rotherham United	0–2	Sheffield Wednesday	Rotherham
19:45 BST	Vaulks (yellow card) 64'; Newell (yellow card) 76'	Report	Fletcher 19', 44'	Stadium: New York Stadium; Attendance: 10,669; Referee: Tony Harrington

8 April 2017 41	Wigan Athletic	3–2	Rotherham United	Wigan
15:00 BST	Obertan 34'; Gilbey 65'; Powell (yellow card) 90+5' (goal) 90+6'	Report	Ward 29'; Forde 61'; Fisher (yellow card) 83'; Price (yellow card) 90+5'	Stadium: DW Stadium; Attendance: 10,085; Referee: Scott Duncan

14 April 2017 42	Rotherham United	1–1	Birmingham City	Rotherham
15:00 BST	Mattock (yellow card) 57'; Vaulks (yellow card) 68'; Ward 85'	Report	Jutkiewicz (yellow card) 42'; Bielik (yellow card) 53'; Frei 73' (yellow card) 75'	Stadium: New York Stadium; Attendance: 10,160; Referee: James Linington

17 April 2017 43	Reading	2–1	Rotherham United	Reading
15:00 BST	Grabban 66'; Swift 79'	Report	Vaulks (yellow card) 17'; Adeyemi 19'; Mattock (yellow card) 85'	Stadium: Madejski Stadium; Attendance: 16,711; Referee: Chris Kavanagh

22 April 2017 44	Rotherham United	1–0	Ipswich Town	Rotherham
15:00 BST	Bray (yellow card) 64'; Mattock (yellow card) 74'; Adeyemi 79'	Report	Diagouraga (yellow card) 54'	Stadium: New York Stadium; Attendance: 8,266; Referee: Jeremy Simpson

29 April 2017 45	Preston North End	1–1	Rotherham United	Preston
15:00 BST	May 41'	Report	Smallwood 9' (yellow card) 69'	Stadium: Deepdale; Attendance: 11,032; Referee: Robert Jones

7 May 2017 46	Rotherham United	1–1	Derby County	Rotherham
12:00 BST	Frecklington 66'	Report	Ince 84' (pen.)	Stadium: New York Stadium; Attendance: 10,763; Referee: Darren Deadman

=== FA Cup ===
On 5 December 2016, the third round draw for the EFL Cup was made.

7 January 2017 Round 3	Rotherham United	2–3	Oxford United	Rotherham
15:00 GMT	Broadfoot (yellow card) 35'; Fisher (yellow card) 37'; Ward 51'; Adeyemi 90'	Report	Maguire (penalty missed) 36'; Taylor 41'; Edwards 80'; Hemmings 88'	Stadium: AESSEAL New York Stadium; Attendance: 5,618; Referee: Darren Bond

=== EFL Cup ===
On 22 June 2016, the first round draw for the EFL Cup was made.

9 August 2016 Round 1	Rotherham United	4–5 (a.e.t.)	Morecambe	Rotherham
19:45 BST	Halford 59' (pen.); Yates 81', 120'; Forde 83'	Report	Stockton 6'; Dunn 68', 90+2' (pen.), 118'; Ellison 113'	Stadium: AESSEAL New York Stadium; Attendance: 3,793; Referee: Seb Stockbridge

== Transfers ==
As of 5 September 2016

=== Transfers in ===
Date from	Position	Nationality	Name	From	Fee	Ref.
1 July 2016	LW	(Republic of Ireland)	Anthony Forde	Walsall	Undisclosed	
16 July 2016	GK	(Wales)	Lewis Price	Sheffield Wednesday	Free transfer	
22 July 2016	CM	(England)	Will Vaulks	Falkirk	Undisclosed	
2 August 2016	CB	(England)	Kelvin Wilson	Nottingham Forest	Free transfer	
3 August 2016	RW	(England)	Jon Taylor	Peterborough United	Undisclosed	
10 August 2016	RB	(England)	Darnell Fisher	Celtic	Undisclosed	
12 August 2016	CB	(England)	Dominic Ball	Tottenham Hotspur	Undisclosed	
5 September 2016	CF	(Antigua and Barbuda)	Dexter Blackstock	Nottingham Forest	Free transfer	
24 October 2016	CF	(Nigeria)	Peter Odemwingie	Free agent	Free transfer	
19 January 2017	GK	(England)	Richard O'Donnell	Bristol City	Undisclosed	
30 January 2017	LB	(England)	Ben Purrington	Plymouth Argyle	Undisclosed	
2 February 2017	CB	(Sweden)	Joel Ekstrand	Bristol City	Free transfer	

=== Transfers out ===
Date from	Position	Nationality	Name	To	Fee	Ref.
1 July 2016	CF	(Argentina)	Luciano Becchio	Free agent	Released	
1 July 2016	CF	(Republic of Ireland)	Leon Best	Free agent (Note: Following Best's release, he signed for Ipswich Town.)	Released	
1 July 2016	RB	(England)	Lewis Buxton	Free agent (Note: Following Buxton's release, he signed for Bolton Wanderers.)	Released	
1 July 2016	GK	(England)	Alex Cairns	Free agent (Note: Following Cairns' release, he signed for Fleetwood Town.)	Released	
1 July 2016	GK	(England)	Adam Collin	Free agent (Note: Following Collin's release, he signed for Notts County.)	Released	
1 July 2016	CB	(Wales)	Danny Collins	Free agent	Released	
1 July 2016	CF	(England)	Matt Derbyshire	Omonia	Free transfer	
1 July 2016	CB	(Jamaica)	Lloyd Doyley	Free agent (Note: Following Doyley's release, he signed for Colchester United.)	Released	
1 July 2016	CM	(Republic of Ireland)	Paul Green	Free agent (Note: Following Green's release, he signed for Oldham Athletic.)	Released	
1 July 2016	GK	(Republic of Ireland)	Paddy Kenny	Free agent (Note: Following Kenny's release, he signed for Northampton Town.)	Released	
1 July 2016	CF	(Argentina)	Emmanuel Ledesma	Free agent (Note: Following Ledesma's release, he signed for Brentford.)	Released	
1 July 2016	RB	(England)	Frazer Richardson	Free agent (Note: Following Richardson's release, he signed for Doncaster Rovers.)	Released	
1 July 2016	LW	(England)	Jerome Thomas	Free agent (Note: Following Thomas' release, he signed for Port Vale.)	Released	
6 January 2017	CB	(England)	Greg Halford	Cardiff City	Undisclosed	
25 January 2017	CF	(Nigeria)	Peter Odemwingie	Free agent	Released	

=== Loans in ===
Date from	Position	Nationality	Name	From	Date until	Ref.
20 July 2016	CM	(England)	Jake Forster-Caskey	Brighton & Hove Albion	5 January 2017 (Note: Jake Forster-Caskey's loan deal was originally until the end of season, but agreement was reached to terminate early.)	
4 August 2016	CM	(Scotland)	Scott Allan	Celtic	End of Season	
15 August 2016	CF	(England)	Isaiah Brown	Chelsea	6 January 2017 (Note: Isaiah Brown's youth loan was originally until the end of the season, but he was recalled early by Chelsea.)	
18 August 2016	CM	(England)	Tom Adeyemi	Cardiff City	End of Season	
31 August 2016	CB	(England)	Dael Fry	Middlesbrough	4 January 2017 (Note: Dael Fry's loan deal was originally until the end of season, but agreement was reached to terminate early.)	
27 January 2017	RW	(Wales)	Alex Bray	Swansea City	9 June 2017	
30 January 2017	CB	(Nigeria)	Semi Ajayi	Cardiff City	End of Season	
31 January 2017	CF	(England)	Carlton Morris	Norwich City	End of Season	

=== Loans out ===
Date from	Position	Nationality	Name	To	Date until	Ref.
17 August 2016	CM	(Wales)	Chris Dawson	Viking	10 January 2017	
24 August 2016	FW	(England)	Darnelle Bailey-King	Gainsborough Trinity	End of season	
26 August 2016	FW	(England)	Kuda Muskwe	Stocksbridge Park Steels	25 September 2016	
26 August 2016	CB	(England)	Tom Rose	Stocksbridge Park Steels	25 September 2016	
31 August 2016	CM	(England)	Richard Smallwood	Scunthorpe United	9 January 2017 (Note: Richie Smallwood's loan was originally until the end of the season, but agreement was reached to terminate it early.)	
31 August 2016	CB	(England)	Tom Thorpe	Bolton Wanderers	End of Season	
2 September 2016	GK	(England)	Laurence Bilboe	Mickelover Sports	1 October 2016	
10 October 2016	FW	(England)	Kuda Muskwe	Grantham Town	10 November 2016	
13 October 2016	LB	(England)	Mason Warren	Grantham Town	12 November 2016	
14 October 2016	CB	(England)	Tom Rose	Sheffield	17 January 2017	
14 October 2016	RB	(England)	Fabian Bailey	Sheffield	13 November 2016	
11 November 2016	FW	(England)	Kuda Muskwe	Frickley Athletic	10 December 2016	
19 December 2016	LB	(England)	Mason Warren	Matlock Town	16 January 2017	
3 January 2017	CB	(England)	Dominic Ball	Peterborough United	End of Season	
17 February 2017	CB	(England)	Tom Rose	Worcester City	End of season	
24 February 2017	FW	(England)	Kuda Muskwe	Mickelover Sports	23 March 2017	
23 March 2017	FW	(England)	Kuda Muskwe	Worcester City	End of season	
