= 2024–25 Huddersfield Town A.F.C. season =

116th season in existence of Huddersfield Town AFC

Huddersfield Town
2024–25 season
- Chairman: Kevin M. Nagle
- Head coach: Michael Duff (until 9 March); Jon Worthington (interim)
- Stadium: Kirklees Stadium
- League One: 10th
- FA Cup: First round
- EFL Cup: Second round
- EFL Trophy: Round of 32
- Top goalscorer: League: Josh Koroma (11); All: Josh Koroma (12)
- Average home league attendance: 18,817
Home colours	Away colours	Third colours

The 2024–25 season was the 116th season in the history of Huddersfield Town Association Football Club and their first season back in League One since the 2011–12 season following relegation from the Championship in the previous season. In addition to the domestic league, the club also participated in the FA Cup, the EFL Cup, and the EFL Trophy.

== Transfers ==
=== In ===
Date	Pos.	Player	From	Fee	Ref.
18 June 2024	RM	Lasse Sørensen (DEN)	Lincoln City (ENG)	Undisclosed	
1 July 2024	LM	Mickel Miller (ENG)	Plymouth Argyle (ENG)	Free	
2 July 2024	CM	Herbie Kane (ENG)	Barnsley (ENG)	Free	
4 July 2024	AM	Antony Evans (ENG)	Bristol Rovers (ENG)	Undisclosed	
28 August 2024	CB	Aaron O'Reilly (Note: Signed initially for the 'B team) (IRL)	Aston Villa (ENG)	Free	
10 September 2024	CF	Freddie Ladapo (ENG)	Ipswich Town (ENG)	Free	
18 September 2024	GK	Oliver Riva (ENG)	Accrington Stanley (ENG)	Free	
1 January 2025 (Note: The transfer was announced on 28 December, and would become official on January 1 once the transfer window reopened)	LB	Ruben Roosken (NED)	Heracles Almelo (NED)	Undisclosed	
10 January 2025	CF	Joe Taylor (WAL)	Luton Town (ENG)	Undisclosed	
15 January 2025	CF	Dion Charles (NIR)	Bolton Wanderers (ENG)	Undisclosed	

=== Out ===
Date	Pos.	Player	To	Fee	Ref.
20 June 2024	CM	Jack Rudoni (ENG)	Coventry City (ENG)	Undisclosed	
26 July 2024	CF	Tyreece Simpson (ENG)	Stevenage (ENG)	Undisclosed	
30 July 2024	LB	Ben Jackson (ENG)	Barrow (ENG)	Undisclosed	
17 August 2024	CM	Josh Austerfield (ENG)	Salford City (ENG)	Undisclosed	
30 August 2024	LW	Pat Jones (WAL)	Exeter City (ENG)	Undisclosed	
2 January 2025	LB	Jaheim Headley (ENG)	Port Vale (ENG)	Undisclosed	
6 January 2025	CF	Kian Harratt (ENG)	Fleetwood Town (ENG)	Undisclosed	
6 January 2025	CF	Kieran Phillips (ENG)	Ross County (SCO)	Undisclosed	
17 January 2025	CB	Michał Helik (POL)	Oxford United (ENG)	Undisclosed	

=== Loaned in ===
Date	Pos.	Player	From	Date until	Ref.
9 August 2024	CF	Callum Marshall (NIR)	West Ham United (ENG)	End of Season	
28 August 2024	DM	Joe Hodge (IRL)	Wolverhampton Wanderers (ENG)	End of Season	
28 August 2024	CB	Nigel Lonwijk (NED)	Wolverhampton Wanderers (ENG)	End of Season	
3 February 2025	AM	Tawanda Chirewa (ZIM)	Wolverhampton Wanderers (ENG)	End of Season	

=== Loaned out ===
Date	Pos.	Player	To	Date until	Ref.
30 July 2024	RB	Neo Eccleston (ENG)	Barrow (ENG)	15 January 2025 (Note: On 15 January, Eccleston was recalled back from his loan at Barrow)	
30 July 2024	RW	Sorba Thomas (WAL)	Nantes (FRA)	End of Season	
30 August 2024	CF	Kian Harratt (ENG)	Fleetwood Town (ENG)	7 January 2025 (Note: On 7 January, Harratt's loan at Fleetwood was made permanently)	
30 August 2024	CF	Kyle Hudlin (ENG)	Newport County (WAL)	End of Season	
7 September 2024	CM	Scott High (SCO)	FC Halifax Town (ENG)	3 November 2024	
7 January 2025	CB	Eko Solomon (ENG)	Harrogate Town (ENG)	End of Season	
24 January 2025	CM	Scott High (SCO)	FC Halifax Town (ENG)	End of Season	
24 January 2025	GK	Oliver Riva (ENG)	Sheffield (ENG)	22 February 2025	
24 January 2025	DM	Daniel Vost (ENG)	Warrington Town (ENG)	22 February 2025	
4 February 2025	CF	Bojan Radulović (SRB)	Fortuna Sittard (NED)	End of Season	

=== Released / Out of Contract ===
Date	Pos.	Player	Subsequent club	Join date	Ref.
30 June 2024	CM	Hazeem Bakre (ENG)	Middlesbrough (ENG)	1 July 2024	
30 June 2024	RW	Connor Mahoney (ENG)	Barrow (ENG)	1 July 2024	
30 June 2024	CF	Jordan Rhodes (SCO)	Blackpool (ENG)	1 July 2024	
30 June 2024	RM	Aaron Rowe (ENG)	Gillingham (ENG)	1 July 2024	
30 June 2024	CB	Yūta Nakayama (JPN)	Machida Zelvia (JPN)	14 August 2024	
30 June 2024	CB	Mustapha Olagunju (ENG)	Ebbsfleet United (ENG)	2 September 2024	
30 June 2024	CM	Brahima Diarra (MLI)	Al Wahda (UAE)	5 September 2024	
30 June 2024	GK	Giosue Bellagambi (UGA)	Barnet (ENG)	11 October 2024	
30 June 2024	GK	Michael Acquah (ENG)			
30 June 2024	CB	David Adewoju (ENG)			
30 June 2024	RW	Myles Bright (ENG)			
30 June 2024	CB	Freddie Fletcher (ENG)			
30 June 2024	CM	Dylan Helliwell (ENG)			
30 June 2024	LB	Shane Maroodza (ZIM)			
30 June 2024	CM	Ben Midgley (ENG)			
30 June 2024	CF	Aaron Ojungu (ENG)			
30 June 2024	RW	Charles Ondo (EQG)			
30 June 2024	CB	Archie Sheppard (ENG)			

== Pre-season and friendlies ==
On 17 May, Huddersfield announced their pre-season preparations, with matches against Emley, Alfreton Town, Guiseley, York City and Harrogate Town along with a tour of Austria. In July it was confirmed Town would face Aris Limassol, Hertha BSC and Lecce during the pre-season tour in Austria. On July 19, another friendly was added, against Sheffield United.

Win Draw Loss Fixtures

29 June 2024 Friendly	Emley	0–5	Huddersfield Town	Emley
15:00 BST		Report	Headley 17'; Jones 45'; Kasumu 56'; Wiles 57'; Simpson 90'	Stadium: Welfare Ground

3 July 2024 Friendly	Alfreton Town	v	Huddersfield Town	Alfreton
19:45 BST				Stadium: North Street

6 July 2024 Friendly	Guiseley	0–7	Huddersfield Town	Guiseley
15:00 BST		Report	Iorpenda 3'; Koroma 30', 45'; Healey 46'; Wiles 58'; Radulović 80'; Turton 89'	Stadium: Nethermoor Park

10 July 2024 Friendly	York City	v	Huddersfield Town	Huntington
19:00 BST				Stadium: York Community Stadium

13 July 2024 Friendly	Harrogate Town	2–3	Huddersfield Town	Harrogate
15:00 BST	Duke-McKenna 2'; Trialist 45'	Report	Ward 8'; Healey 22'; Sørensen 55'	Stadium: Wetherby Road

22 July 2024 Friendly	Aris Limassol	4–2	Huddersfield Town	Mittersill, Austria
18:00 CEST (17:00 BST)	Bengtsson 11'; Struski 25'; Dimitríou 61'; Kovačev 81'		Healey 41' (pen.); Hogg 48'	Stadium: Mittersill Arena

25 July 2024 Friendly	Hertha BSC	1–2	Huddersfield Town	Kössen, Austria
13:00 CEST (12:00 BST)	Schuler 20'	Report	Pearson 5'; Wiles 71'	Stadium: TBC

28 July 2024 Friendly	Lecce	1–2	Huddersfield Town	Kössen, Austria
14:30 CEST (13:30 BST)		Report	Koroma 69'; Healey 81'	Stadium: TBC

2 August 2024 Friendly	Huddersfield Town	1–1	Sheffield United	Huddersfield
19:45 BST	Wiles 5'	Report	Ahmedhodžić 50'	Stadium: Kirklees Stadium; Attendance: 5,126

== Competitions ==
=== League One ===
==== League table ====
Pos	Team	Pld	W	D	L	GF	GA	GD	Pts
8	Bolton Wanderers	46	20	8	18	67	70	−3	68
9	Blackpool	46	17	16	13	72	60	+12	67
10	Huddersfield Town	46	19	7	20	58	55	+3	64
11	Lincoln City	46	16	13	17	64	56	+8	61
12	Barnsley	46	17	10	19	69	73	−4	61

Source: EFL Official Website
Rules for classification: 1) Points; 2) Goal difference; 3) Number of goals scored; 4) Head-to-head results; 5) Wins; 6) Away goals; 7) Penalty points (sec 9.5); 8) 12-point sending off offences

==== Results summary ====
Overall								Home						Away					
Pld	W	D	L	GF	GA	GD	Pts	W	D	L	GF	GA	GD	W	D	L	GF	GA	GD
46	19	7	20	58	55	+3	64	10	4	9	27	24	+3	9	3	11	31	31	0

Last updated: 3 May 2025.
Source: Soccerway

==== Results by round ====
Round	1	2	3	4	6	7	5^{1}	8	9	10	12	13	14	15	17	11^{2}	18	19	20	21	22	23	25	16^{3}	27	28	29	30	31	32	26^{5}	33	24^{4}	34	35	36	37	39	40	41	38^{6}	42	43	44	45	46
Ground	A	H	H	A	A	H	H	A	A	H	H	A	H	A	H	A	H	A	H	A	H	H	H	A	A	H	H	A	H	A	A	H	A	A	H	A	H	A	A	H	H	A	H	A	A	H
Result	W	W	W	L	W	L	L	L	L	W	W	D	W	D	W	W	W	W	D	W	W	D	D	W	D	L	L	L	D	W	W	L	L	W	L	L	W	L	L	W	L	L	L	L	L	L
Position	1	2	2	5	3	5	5	8	15	9	6	5	5	8	5	5	4	4	4	4	4	4	4	4	4	4	4	5	5	5	5	5	5	5	6	7	6	7	8	8	8	9	9	9	10	10
Points	3	6	9	9	12	12	12	12	12	15	18	19	22	23	26	29	32	35	36	39	42	43	44	47	48	48	48	48	49	52	55	55	55	58	58	58	61	61	61	64	64	64	64	64	64	64

Source: EFL
A = Away; H = Home; W = Win; D = Draw; L = Loss; P = Postponed
Notes:
- ^{1} Matchday 5 (vs. Blackpool) was postponed due to international call-ups.
- ^{2} Matchday 11 (vs. Leyton Orient) was postponed due to international call-ups.
- ^{3} Matchday 16 (vs. Wycombe Wanderers) was postponed due to international call-ups.
- ^{4} Matchday 24 (vs. Wigan Athletic) was postponed due to severe localised flooding.
- ^{5} Matchday 26 (vs. Shrewsbury Town) was postponed due to a frozen pitch.
- ^{6} Matchday 38 (vs. Wycombe Wanderers) was postponed due to international obligations.

==== Matches ====
The league fixtures were released on 26 June 2024.

Win Draw Loss Fixtures

10 August 2024 1	Peterborough United	0–2	Huddersfield Town	Peterborough
17:30 BST	Collins (yellow card) 73'	Report	Evans 36'; Wiles 45+1'; Miller (yellow card) 71'	Stadium: London Road Stadium; Attendance: 10,627; Referee: Sunny Singh Gill

17 August 2024 2	Huddersfield Town	2–1	Stevenage	Huddersfield
15:00 BST	Evans (yellow card) 9'; Koroma 26'; Wiles 52'; Headley (yellow card) 74'; Nicholls (yellow card) 84'; Helik (yellow card) 85'	Report	Piergianni (yellow card) 27'; Phillips (yellow card) 40'; White 90+5' (pen.)	Stadium: Kirklees Stadium; Attendance: 18,529; Referee: Andy Davies

24 August 2024 3	Huddersfield Town	1–0	Shrewsbury Town	Huddersfield
15:00 BST	Marshall 20'; Spencer (yellow card) 49'	Report		Stadium: Kirklees Stadium; Attendance: 18,205; Referee: Tom Reeves

31 August 2024 4	Rotherham United	2–1	Huddersfield Town	Rotherham
12:30 BST	Tiéhi (yellow card) 45+2'; Clarke-Harris 77' (pen.); Wilks 90', (yellow card) 90+1'	Report	Lonwijk (yellow card) 9'; Evans (yellow card) 47'; Sørensen (yellow card) 68'; Ward (red card) 72'; Hodge 74'	Stadium: New York Stadium; Attendance: 10,404; Referee: Seb Stockbridge
Note: Fixture was initially scheduled for a 15:00 kick-off, but was moved for live Sky Sports broadcast.

14 September 2024 6	Bolton Wanderers	0–4	Huddersfield Town	Horwich
15:00 BST	Thomason (yellow card) 37'	Report	Koroma 44', 59'; Hogg (yellow card) 47'; Wiles 68'; Evans 81'	Stadium: Toughsheet Community Stadium; Attendance: 22,532; Referee: Alex Chilowicz

21 September 2024 7	Huddersfield Town	1–3	Northampton Town	Huddersfield
15:00 BST	Headley (yellow card) 33'; Koroma 80', (penalty missed) 84'; Spencer (yellow card) 90+4'	Report	Helik 18' (o.g.); Fosu (yellow card) 20', (goal) 58'; McGeehan 25'; Pinnock (yellow card) 43'; Odimayo (yellow card) 79' (yellow-red card) 83'; Mbete (yellow card) 89'; Baldwin (yellow card) 90+3'	Stadium: Kirklees Stadium; Attendance: 18,417; Referee: Sunny Singh Gill

24 September 2024 5	Huddersfield Town	0–2	Blackpool	Huddersfield
19:45 BST	Evans (yellow card) 81'; Spencer (yellow card) 90+1'	Report	Joseph 31'; Hamilton 45+6'	Stadium: Kirklees Stadium; Attendance: 17,068; Referee: Ben Speedie
Note: Fixture was originally scheduled for 7 September, but was postponed due to international call-ups.

28 September 2024 8	Reading	2–1	Huddersfield Town	Reading
12:30 BST	Elliott (yellow card) 20', (goal) 57'; Knibbs 30'	Report	Pearson 21'; Spencer (yellow card) 22'; Headley (yellow card) 49'; Kasumu (yellow card) 62'	Stadium: Madejski Stadium; Attendance: 11,181; Referee: Scott Oldham
Note: Fixture was initially scheduled for a 15:00 kick-off, but was moved for live Sky Sports broadcast.

1 October 2024 9	Birmingham City	1–0	Huddersfield Town	Bordesley
19:45 BST	Gardner-Hickman (yellow card) 21'; Anderson (yellow card) 59'; May 63'; Bielik (yellow card) 66'; Allsop (yellow card) 89'	Report	Kasumu (yellow card) 61'	Stadium: St Andrew's; Attendance: 24,757; Referee: Ben Toner

5 October 2024 10	Huddersfield Town	2–0	Barnsley	Huddersfield
12:30 BST	Hodge (yellow card) 12'; Marshall (yellow card) 62'; Kane (yellow card) 74'; Wiles 83'; Spencer (yellow card) 90'; Kasumu 90+6'	Report	Keillor-Dunn (yellow card) 48'; Jaló (yellow card) 70'	Stadium: Kirklees Stadium; Attendance: 19,523; Referee: David Rock
Note: Fixture was initially scheduled for a 15:00 kick-off, but was moved for live Sky Sports broadcast.

19 October 2024 12	Huddersfield Town	3–1	Bristol Rovers	Huddersfield
15:00 BST	Pearson 34'; Marshall 38'; Radulović 52'; Lonwijk (yellow card) 67'	Report	Lindsay (yellow card) 21'; Sotiriou (yellow card) 67'; Hutchinson 69'	Stadium: Kirklees Stadium; Attendance: 18,179; Referee: Dean Whitestone

22 October 2024 13	Wrexham	0–0	Huddersfield Town	Wrexham
19:45 BST	O'Connell (yellow card) 48'	Report	Lonwijk (yellow card) 20'; Kasumu (yellow card) 52'; Miller (yellow card) 75'	Stadium: Racecourse Ground; Attendance: 12,894; Referee: Adam Herczeg

26 October 2024 14	Huddersfield Town	2–0	Exeter City	Huddersfield
15:00 BST	Pearson 16'; Wiles 63'	Report		Stadium: Kirklees Stadium; Attendance: 17,890; Referee: Elliot Bell

9 November 2024 15	Crawley Town	2–2	Huddersfield Town	Crawley
15:00 GMT	Hepburn-Murphy 42'; Anderson 65'; Showunmi (yellow card) 80'; Ibrahim (yellow card) 90+7'	Report	Healey 59'; Kane 68'	Stadium: Broadfield Stadium; Attendance: 4,752; Referee: Scott Simpson

23 November 2024 17	Huddersfield Town	2–1	Charlton Athletic	Huddersfield
15:00 GMT	Pearson 13'; Helik (yellow card) 59'; Kasumu 63'; Kane (yellow card) 86'	Report	Godden 32' (pen.); Dochery (red card) 36'; Coventry (yellow card) 54'	Stadium: Kirklees Stadium; Attendance: 18,550; Referee: Simon Mather

26 November 2024 11	Leyton Orient	0–2	Huddersfield Town	Leyton
19:45 GMT	Beckles (yellow card) 63'; Keeley (yellow card) 65'	Report	Helik 26', (yellow card) 86'; Koroma (penalty missed) 64'; Marshall 90'	Stadium: Brisbane Road; Attendance: 7,541; Referee: Lee Swabey
Note: Fixture was originally scheduled for 12 October, but was postponed due international call-ups.

3 December 2024 18	Huddersfield Town	1–0	Wigan Athletic	Huddersfield
20:00 GMT	Turton 53'; Lonwijk (yellow card) 56'; Ruffels (yellow card) 69'	Report	M. Smith (yellow card) 11'; Aimson (yellow card) 16'; Weir (yellow card) 71'	Stadium: Kirklees Stadium; Attendance: 17,036; Referee: Scott Oldham
Note: Fixture was initially scheduled for a 19:45 kick-off, but was moved for live Sky Sports broadcast.

7 December 2024 19	Mansfield Town	1–2	Huddersfield Town	Mansfield
15:00 GMT	Oshilaja 31'; Flint (yellow card) 54'	Report	Wiles 8'; Koroma 33'; Helik (yellow card) 45+2'; Chapman (yellow card) 45+3'; Radulović (yellow card) 90+4'	Stadium: Field Mill; Attendance: 8,568; Referee: Adam Herczeg

14 December 2024 20	Huddersfield Town	2–2	Lincoln City	Huddersfield
15:00 GMT	Spencer 49'; Marshall 89'; Lonwijk (yellow card) 90+6'	Report	House 15'; Cadamarteri 25'; Darikwa (yellow card) 59'; Wickens (yellow card) 75'	Stadium: Kirklees Stadium; Attendance: 18,675; Referee: Alan Young

20 December 2024 21	Cambridge United	0–4	Huddersfield Town	Cambridge
19:45 GMT	Brophy (yellow card) 40'	Report	Kasumu 12', (yellow card) 16'; Spencer 32'; Marshall 38', 72'; Turton (yellow card) 47'	Stadium: Abbey Stadium; Attendance: 6,949; Referee: Ollie Yates
Note: Fixture was initially scheduled for 21 December, but was moved to allow an extra days recovery between matches.

26 December 2024 22	Huddersfield Town	1–0	Stockport County	Huddersfield
15:00 GMT	Bate 1' (o.g.); Lonwijk (yellow card) 57'	Report	Bailey (yellow card) 34'; Macauley Southam-Hales (yellow card) 56'	Stadium: Kirklees Stadium; Attendance: 21,657; Referee: Will Finnie

29 December 2024 23	Huddersfield Town	1–1	Burton Albion	Huddersfield
15:00 GMT	Kasumu (yellow card) 38'; Helik 88'	Report	Webster 13'; Crocombe (yellow card) 71'; Vancooten (yellow card) 73'	Stadium: Kirklees Stadium; Attendance: 18,842; Referee: Ben Toner

4 January 2025 25	Huddersfield Town	0–0	Rotherham United	Huddersfield
15:00 GMT	Lees (yellow card) 54'; Wiles (yellow card) 65'; Roosken (red card) 82'	Report	Jules (yellow card) 31'; Nombe (yellow card) 89'	Stadium: Kirklees Stadium; Attendance: 18,353; Referee: Alex Chilowicz

7 January 2025 16	Wycombe Wanderers	0–1	Huddersfield Town	High Wycombe
19:45 GMT		Report	Kane 15'; Koroma (yellow card) 21'; Lees (yellow card) 67'; Hogg (yellow card) 78'	Stadium: Adams Park; Referee: Thomas Kirk
Note: Fixture was originally scheduled for 16 November, but was postponed due to international call-ups.

18 January 2025 27	Blackpool	2–2	Huddersfield Town	Blackpool
12:30 GMT	Apter 11'; Morgan 45+4'	Report	Pearson (yellow card) 41'; Taylor 47'; Spencer 50', (yellow card) 84'	Stadium: Bloomfield Road; Attendance: 10,410; Referee: Martin Coy
Note: Fixture was initially scheduled for a 15:00 kick-off, but was moved for live Sky Sports broadcasting.

25 January 2025 28	Huddersfield Town	0–1	Bolton Wanderers	Huddersfield
12:30 GMT	Spencer (yellow card) 43'; Sørensen (yellow card) 64'	Report	Dacres-Cogley (yellow card) 41'; Collins 55'; Schön (yellow card) 64'; Johnston (yellow card) 89'; Morley (yellow card) 90+3'; Osei-Tutu (yellow card) 90+4'	Stadium: Kirklees Stadium; Attendance: 19,999; Referee: Paul Howard
Note: Fixture was initially scheduled for a 15:00 kick-off, but was moved for live Sky Sports broadcasting.

28 January 2025 29	Huddersfield Town	0–1	Birmingham City	Huddersfield
20:00 GMT	Spencer (yellow card) 7'; Hogg (yellow card) 76'	Report	Anderson 49'; Dykes (yellow card) 85'; May (yellow card) 90+6'	Stadium: Kirklees Stadium; Attendance: 19,138; Referee: Adam Herczeg
Note: Fixture was initially scheduled for a 19:45 kick-off, but was moved for live Sky Sports broadcasting.

1 February 2025 30	Northampton Town	3–2	Huddersfield Town	Northampton
15:00 GMT	Hoskins 32'; Eaves 40', (yellow card) 87'; Shaw 51'	Report	Charles (yellow card) 50'; Pearson (yellow card) 55'; Kane 70'; Hogg 82'	Stadium: Sixfields Stadium; Attendance: 6,933; Referee: Ben Speedie

8 February 2025 31	Huddersfield Town	0–0	Reading	Huddersfield
15:00 GMT	Spencer (yellow card) 53'; Kasumu (yellow card) 87'	Report	Knibbs (yellow card) 60'; Campbell (yellow card) 69'; Ehibhatiomhan (yellow card) 81'	Stadium: Kirklees Stadium; Attendance: 18,385; Referee: Scott Tallis

15 February 2025 32	Barnsley	1–2	Huddersfield Town	Barnsley
15:00 GMT	Russell 14'; Farrugia (yellow card) 39'; Keillor-Dunn (yellow card) 49'; Earl (yellow card) 87'	Report	Kasumu (yellow card) 45'; Koroma 59'; Wiles 61'; Spencer (yellow card) 72'	Stadium: Oakwell; Attendance: 15,600; Referee: David Rock

18 February 2025 26	Shrewsbury Town	0–1	Huddersfield Town	Shrewsbury
19:45 GMT	Benning (yellow card) 24'; Ojo (yellow card) 76'; Gape (yellow card) 90'; Stewart (yellow card) 90+8'	Report	Hogg (yellow card) 59'; Koroma 82'; Hodge (yellow card) 90+1'	Stadium: New Meadow; Attendance: 6,862; Referee: James Oldham
Note: Fixture was originally scheduled for 11 January, but was postponed due to a frozen pitch.

22 February 2025 33	Huddersfield Town	0–1	Peterborough United	Huddersfield
15:00 GMT	Hogg (yellow card) 22'	Report	Odoh (yellow card) 20'; Kyprianou 45+4'; Dornelly (yellow card) 73'; Ihionvien (yellow card) 82'	Stadium: Kirklees Stadium; Attendance: 18,977; Referee: Darren Drysdale

25 February 2025 24	Wigan Athletic	2–1	Huddersfield Town	Wigan
19:45 GMT	Taylor (yellow card) 4', (goal) 15'; Dale 42'	Report	Marshall 50'; Lonwijk (yellow card) 60'; Spencer (yellow card) 74'	Stadium: Brick Community Stadium; Attendance: 10,049; Referee: Ross Joyce
Note: Fixture was originally scheduled for 1 January, but was postponed due to severe localised flooding.

1 March 2025 34	Stevenage	1–2	Huddersfield Town	Stevenage
15:00 GMT	Hanlan 11'	Report	Marshall 3'; Lonwijk 24', (yellow card) 66'; Evans (yellow card) 33'; Hogg (yellow card) 71'	Stadium: Broadhall Way; Attendance: 4,373; Referee: James Linington

4 March 2025 35	Huddersfield Town	0–1	Wrexham	Huddersfield
19:45 BST			Cleworth (yellow card) 68'; Fletcher 73' (yellow card) 90+1'	Stadium: John Smith's Stadium; Attendance: 20,502; Referee: Farai Hallam

8 March 2025 36	Bristol Rovers	1–0	Huddersfield Town	Bristol
15:00 GMT	Sotiriou 10'; Swinkels (yellow card) 72'	Report	Hodge (yellow card) 63'; Taylor (yellow card) 72'	Stadium: Memorial Stadium; Attendance: 7,705; Referee: Tom Reeves

15 March 2025 37	Huddersfield Town	5–1	Crawley Town	Huddersfield
15:00 GMT	Taylor 3'; Barker 8' (o.g.); Marshall 16'; Pearson 29'; Roosken 76'; Ruffels (yellow card) 81'; Hogg (yellow card) 82'	Report	Fraser (yellow card) 26'; Mullarkey (yellow card) 56'; Barker (yellow card) 64'; Adeyemo 90+6'	Stadium: Kirklees Stadium; Attendance: 18,516; Referee: Seb Stockbridge

29 March 2025 39	Charlton Athletic	4–0	Huddersfield Town	Charlton, London
12:30 GMT	Godden 1'; Campbell 17', 53'; Nicholls 60' (o.g.)	Report	Evans (yellow card) 50'	Stadium: The Valley; Attendance: 17,278; Referee: Declan Bourne
Note: Fixture was initially scheduled for a 15:00 kick-off, but was moved for live Sky Sports broadcasting.

1 April 2025 40	Lincoln City	1–0	Huddersfield Town	Lincoln
19:45 GMT	Hackett 35'	Report		Stadium: Sincil Bank; Attendance: 8,755; Referee: Ruebyn Ricardo

5 April 2025 41	Huddersfield Town	2–1	Mansfield Town	Huddersfield
15:00 GMT	Roosken 69', (yellow card) 87'; Wiles 80'	Report	Reed (yellow card) 41'; Williams (yellow card) 62'; Dwyer 84'; Baccus (yellow card) 85'	Stadium: Kirklees Stadium; Referee: Martin Coy

8 April 2025 38	Huddersfield Town	0–1	Wycombe Wanderers	Huddersfield
19:45 BST	Sørensen (yellow card) 79'; Ruffels (yellow card) 80'	Report	Bradley (yellow card) 15'; Udoh 63'	Stadium: Kirklees Stadium; Attendance: 17,297; Referee: Scott Oldham
Note: Fixture was initially scheduled for 22 March, but was moved due to international obligations.

12 April 2025 42	Burton Albion	3–0	Huddersfield Town	Burton upon Trent
15:00 GMT	Burrell 9', 55'; Dodgson (yellow card) 20'; Larsson 45'; Williams (yellow card) 71'	Report	Balker (yellow card) 51'; Hogg (yellow card) 53'; Evans (yellow card) 70'	Stadium: Pirelli Stadium; Attendance: 4,278; Referee: Scott Jackson

18 April 2025 43	Huddersfield Town	1–2	Cambridge United	Huddersfield
15:00 GMT	Koroma 89'; Evans (yellow card) 90+4'	Report	Morrison (yellow card) 23'; Digby (yellow card) 54'; Brophy 69'; Stevens (yellow card) 73'; Gibbons (yellow card) 76'; Kaikai 90+2'	Stadium: Kirklees Stadium; Referee: Sam Allison

21 April 2025 44	Stockport County	2–1	Huddersfield Town	Edgeley
15:00 GMT	Horsfall 74'; Norwood (yellow card) 75', (goal) 87' (pen.)	Report	Koroma (yellow card) 57', (goal) 61'; Charles (yellow card) 72'; Pearson (yellow card) 86'; Kasumu (yellow card) 90'; Marshall (red card) 90+5'	Stadium: Edgeley Park; Attendance: 10,346; Referee: Alex Chilowicz

26 April 2025 45	Exeter City	3–1	Huddersfield Town	Exeter
15:00 GMT	Niskanen 39'; McMillan 56', (yellow card) 82'; Oluwabori 90+1'	Report	Koroma 20'; Turton (yellow card) 66'; Kane (yellow card) 79'	Stadium: St James Park; Attendance: 7,276; Referee: Oliver Yates

3 May 2025 46	Huddersfield Town	1–4	Leyton Orient	Huddersfield
15:00 GMT				Stadium: Kirklees Stadium

=== FA Cup ===
Huddersfield Town were drawn away to Tamworth in the first round.

Win Draw Loss Fixtures

1 November 2024 First round	Tamworth	1–0	Huddersfield Town	Tamworth
19:45 GMT	Maxwell 44' (o.g.); Cullinane-Liburd (yellow card) 57'; Tonks (yellow card) 58'; Creaney (yellow card) 90+4'	Report	Marshall (yellow card) 47'	Stadium: The Lamb Ground; Attendance: 3,533; Referee: Ben Speedie

=== EFL Cup ===
On 27 June, the draw for the first round was made, with Huddersfield being drawn at home against Morecambe. In the second round, they were drawn away to Walsall.

Win Draw Loss Fixtures

13 August 2024 First round	Huddersfield Town	3–0	Morecambe	Huddersfield
19:45 BST	Headley 1'; Marshall 38'; Ward 43'	Report	Angol (yellow card) 13'; Harrack (yellow card) 52' (yellow-red card) 75'	Stadium: Kirklees Stadium; Attendance: 5,111; Referee: Simon Mather

27 August 2024 Second round	Walsall	3–2	Huddersfield Town	Bescot
19:45 BST	Lowe (penalty missed) 51', 63', 70'; Helik 77' (o.g.); Jellis (yellow card) 82'	Report	Koroma 16'; Ruffels (yellow card) 22', (goal) 53'; Pearson (red card) 42'; Evans (yellow card) 45+3'	Stadium: Bescot Stadium; Attendance: 3,378; Referee: Edward Duckworth

=== EFL Trophy ===
In the group stage, Huddersfield were drawn into Northern Group F alongside Barnsley, Doncaster Rovers and Manchester United U21. In the round of 32, Huddersfield were drawn away to Bolton Wanderers.

==== Group stage ====
Pos	Div	Team	Pld	W	PW	PL	L	GF	GA	GD	Pts	Qualification
1	L2	Doncaster Rovers	3	2	0	1	0	8	5	+3	7	Advance to Round 2
2	L1	Huddersfield Town	3	2	0	0	1	7	3	+4	6	Advance to Round 2
3	ACA	Manchester United U21	3	1	1	0	1	7	9	−2	5	
4	L1	Barnsley	3	0	0	0	3	3	8	−5	0	

Source: EFL

Win Draw Loss Fixtures

3 September 2024 Group stage	Doncaster Rovers	2–1	Huddersfield Town	Doncaster
19:00 BST	Yeboah 37'; Sbarra (yellow card) 47'; Ironside 83' (pen.)	Report	Ward 49'; Turton (yellow card) 51'; Lonwijk (yellow card) 55'	Stadium: Eco-Power Stadium; Attendance: 2,319; Referee: Declan Bourne

8 October 2024 Group stage	Huddersfield Town	2–0	Barnsley	Huddersfield
19:45 BST	Ladapo 59'; Kane (yellow card) 70'; Ward 90+1'	Report	McCarthy (yellow card) 26'; Marsh (yellow card) 54'; Pines (red card) 83'; Humphrys (yellow card) 86'	Stadium: Kirklees Stadium; Attendance: 2,182; Referee: Michael Salisbury

12 November 2024 Group stage	Huddersfield Town	4–1	Manchester United U21	Huddersfield
19:45 GMT	Wiles 29'; Healey 67'; Kasumu (yellow card) 71', (goal) 90'; Kane (yellow card) 78'; Miller (yellow card) 84'; Lees 90+7'	Report	Koné (yellow card) 36'; Musa 42'; Kingdon (yellow card) 90+2'	Stadium: Kirklees Stadium; Attendance: 3,021; Referee: Dale Baines

==== Knoutout stages ====
10 December 2024 Round of 32	Bolton Wanderers	3–1	Huddersfield Town	Horwich
19:45 GMT	Lolos 40', (yellow card) 86'; Collins 83', 88'	Report	Pearson (yellow card) 48'; Koroma (yellow card) 50'; Kasumu (yellow card) 52'; Headley (yellow card) 86'; Dacres-Cogley 90' (o.g.); Iorpenda (yellow card) 90+5'	Stadium: Toughsheet Community Stadium; Attendance: 1,802; Referee: Scott Jackson

== Statistics ==
=== Appearances and goals ===
As of match played 26 April 2025

Players with no appearances are not included on the list
Italics indicate a loaned in player

No.	Pos	Nat	Player	Total		League One		FA Cup		EFL Cup		EFL Trophy	
No.	Pos	Nat	Player	Apps	Goals	Apps	Goals	Apps	Goals	Apps	Goals	Apps	Goals
1	GK	(England) ENG	Lee Nicholls	23	0	23+0	0	0+0	0	0+0	0	0+0	0
2	MF	(Denmark) DEN	Lasse Sørensen	36	0	21+10	0	0+0	0	2+0	0	1+2	0
3	DF	(England) ENG	Josh Ruffels	25	1	14+8	0	0+0	0	1+0	1	2+0	0
4	DF	(England) ENG	Matty Pearson	35	5	24+4	5	1+0	0	2+0	0	4+0	0
6	MF	(England) ENG	Jonathan Hogg	37	1	18+15	1	0+0	0	1+1	0	1+1	0
7	FW	(Northern Ireland) NIR	Callum Marshall	46	10	31+12	9	0+1	0	2+0	1	0+0	0
8	MF	(England) ENG	Ben Wiles	50	9	39+5	8	1+0	0	1+1	0	1+2	1
9	FW	(Serbia) SRB	Bojan Radulović	21	1	9+8	1	1+0	0	0+0	0	3+0	0
10	FW	(England) ENG	Josh Koroma	39	11	26+10	10	0+0	0	1+1	1	1+0	0
11	FW	(England) ENG	Rhys Healey	11	2	2+7	1	0+0	0	0+0	0	1+1	1
13	GK	(Australia) AUS	Jacob Chapman	25	0	22+0	0	0+0	0	0+0	0	3+0	0
14	MF	(England) ENG	Mickel Miller	20	0	15+3	0	0+1	0	0+0	0	1+0	0
15	FW	(Northern Ireland) NIR	Dion Charles	17	0	13+4	0	0+0	0	0+0	0	0+0	0
16	MF	(England) ENG	Herbie Kane	31	3	20+7	3	0+1	0	1+0	0	2+0	0
17	DF	(Northern Ireland) NIR	Brodie Spencer	35	3	28+5	3	0+0	0	1+0	0	1+0	0
18	MF	(Nigeria) NGR	David Kasumu	35	4	26+5	3	1+0	0	1+0	0	1+1	1
19	FW	(England) ENG	Freddie Ladapo	25	1	1+20	0	0+1	0	0+0	0	1+2	1
20	DF	(England) ENG	Ollie Turton	33	1	17+10	1	1+0	0	1+1	0	2+1	0
21	MF	(England) ENG	Antony Evans	36	2	20+13	2	0+0	0	1+0	0	1+1	0
22	FW	(Wales) WAL	Joe Taylor	14	2	7+7	2	0+0	0	0+0	0	0+0	0
23	DF	(Netherlands) NED	Nigel Lonwijk	26	1	21+0	1	1+0	0	0+0	0	4+0	0
24	DF	(Suriname) SUR	Radinio Balker	14	0	10+4	0	0+0	0	0+0	0	0+0	0
25	FW	(England) ENG	Danny Ward	20	3	9+4	0	1+0	0	1+1	1	2+2	2
26	DF	(Netherlands) NED	Ruben Roosken	14	2	11+3	2	0+0	0	0+0	0	0+0	0
27	MF	(Zimbabwe) ZIM	Tawanda Chirewa	13	0	8+5	0	0+0	0	0+0	0	0+0	0
28	MF	(England) ENG	Tom Iorpenda	11	0	0+4	0	1+0	0	1+1	0	3+1	0
30	DF	(England) ENG	Neo Eccleston	2	0	1+1	0	0+0	0	0+0	0	0+0	0
32	DF	(England) ENG	Tom Lees	32	1	28+1	0	1+0	0	0+0	0	1+1	1
34	MF	(England) ENG	Cameron Ashia	1	0	0+0	0	0+0	0	0+0	0	1+0	0
36	MF	(England) ENG	Daniel Vost	1	0	0+0	0	0+0	0	0+0	0	1+0	0
37	MF	(England) ENG	Peter Thomas	1	0	0+0	0	0+0	0	0+0	0	1+0	0
41	MF	(Republic of Ireland) IRL	Joe Hodge	27	1	13+14	1	0+0	0	0+0	0	0+0	0
42	FW	(Northern Ireland) NIR	Conor Falls	1	0	0+1	0	0+0	0	0+0	0	0+0	0
Player(s) who featured but departed the club permanently during the season:
5	DF	(Poland) POL	Michał Helik	21	2	15+2	2	0+0	0	1+1	0	2+0	0
12	GK	(Wales) WAL	Chris Maxwell	4	0	0+0	0	1+0	0	2+0	0	1+0	0
15	DF	(England) ENG	Jaheim Headley	13	1	3+4	0	1+0	0	2+0	1	2+1	0
22	FW	(England) ENG	Kian Harratt	4	0	0+2	0	0+0	0	0+2	0	0+0	0
26	FW	(Wales) WAL	Pat Jones	1	0	0+0	0	0+0	0	0+1	0	0+0	0
