= Danny Ward (English footballer) =

English footballer (born 1990)

Personal information
- Full name: Daniel Carl Ward
- Date of birth: 9 December 1990 (age 35)
- Place of birth: Bradford, England
- Height: 5 ft 11 in (1.80 m)
- Positions: Left winger; forward

Youth career
- 2005–2007: Leeds United
- 2007–2009: Bolton Wanderers

Senior career*
Years	Team	Apps	(Gls)
2009–2011	Bolton Wanderers	2	(0)
2009–2010	→ Swindon Town (loan)	30	(9)
2010	→ Coventry City (loan)	5	(0)
2011	→ Huddersfield Town (loan)	7	(3)
2011–2015	Huddersfield Town	117	(16)
2015	→ Rotherham United (loan)	1	(0)
2015–2017	Rotherham United	90	(18)
2017–2020	Cardiff City	60	(12)
2020–2025	Huddersfield Town	129	(23)
- * Club domestic league appearances and goals as of 19:47, 5 May 2025 (UTC)

Daniel Carl Ward (born 9 December 1990) is an English professional footballer who recently played as a forward or winger for EFL League One club Huddersfield Town. He currently is a free agent.

== Career ==
=== Bolton Wanderers ===
Ward started his career in the Bradford City youth setup before he was snapped up by West Yorkshire rivals Leeds United, but he turned down a new deal at Leeds to join Premier League side Bolton Wanderers. Leeds received compensation as a result of Ward leaving. Danny made his senior debut for Bolton as a substitute in the club's 0–1 home Premier League defeat to Sunderland on 15 August 2009.

On 26 November 2009, he signed for Swindon Town on a one-month loan deal and on 28 December 2009 he scored his first professional goal for Swindon Town in the 46th minute in a 3–1 home win over Yeovil Town.

On 7 September 2010, Ward signed a new three-year contract with Bolton and three days later signed on a three-month loan deal with Coventry City. He made his debut for them in the home game against Leicester City the day after. The loan was cut short on 15 October as Ward returned to Bolton for an operation on his groin which kept him out of the game until the following March.

=== Huddersfield Town ===
==== 2010–11 loan ====
After recovering from his injury, Ward was sent on loan to Football League One side Huddersfield Town on 15 March 2011, for the remainder of the season. He made his debut as a substitute in the 1–0 win over Brentford at Griffin Park on the same day. He scored his first goal, which was the winner to make it 3–2, for Huddersfield against Brighton & Hove Albion on 30 April 2011, which also happened to be the last goal scored at the Withdean Stadium, before going on to score twice in the final league game of the season in the 4–4 home draw with Brentford. Ward scored in the League One play-off semi-final second-leg against A.F.C. Bournemouth. The match was 3–3 after 120 minutes, but Huddersfield won on penalties 4–2, which included Ward scoring his, qualifying Huddersfield for the final at Old Trafford where they just came short of promotion losing 3–0 in the final against Peterborough United.

==== 2011–12 season ====
On 11 July 2011, Ward signed a three-year contract at Huddersfield Town. The fee was around £1 million. He made his second début for the Terriers in their 1–1 draw against Bury, at the Galpharm Stadium, on 6 August 2011. He scored his first goal the week after in the 2–2 away draw to Rochdale. Ward finished the season with 47 appearances in all competitions scoring five times four league goals, he also made 39 appearances in the league as Huddersfield finished the season as Play-off champions winning promotion to the Championship after beating Sheffield United 8–7 on penalties in the Wembley final.

==== 2012–13 season ====
Ward started his first game of the 2012–13 season in Huddersfield's 1–0 away defeat at Preston North End in the Football League Cup when he was substituted in the 46th minute. first league game came in Huddersfield's first home game of the coming on as an 81st-minute substitute in Huddersfield's 1–1 home draw with Nottingham Forest on 21 August 2012. Ward's first league start didn't come until 1 September in a 2–2 away draw at Ipswich Town, his first goal came in the next match at home to Derby County when he scored the only goal of the 1–0 game after just 47 seconds on 15 September 2012.

=== Rotherham United ===
On 9 January 2015, Ward moved on loan to Rotherham United on a 28-day emergency loan, with a view to a permanent deal. On 12 January 2015, it was confirmed that Ward had made a permanent deal with the Millers for an undisclosed fee. Rotherham escaped relegation during 2015–16 season.

The following season, Ward was one of the highlights in a poor season as Rotherham were relegated, which led to attraction from other clubs. Ward finished the club's top goalscorers with 12 goals to his name, and his contract was extended by a further year at the end of the season.

During the 2016-17 season, on Tuesday 27 September, Ward scored a goal away against vs Huddersfield Town, whose goalkeeper was also called Danny Ward.

=== Cardiff City ===
During the 2017 summer transfer window, Rotherham accepted a £1.6 million plus add-ons bid from Cardiff City for Ward, completing the move on 23 June 2017, signing a three-year deal that will last until the summer of 2020. He made his debut for the club on the opening day of the 2017–18 season, during a 1–0 victory over Burton Albion as a substitute in place of Junior Hoilett. Ward scored his first goal for the club at Fulham in a 1–1 draw, on 9 September. Following an injury to Kenneth Zohore, Ward saw a successful run in the starting line up scoring three in six games, one of which (against Nottingham Forest) was nominated for the EFL Goal of the Month, before surgery ruled him out for up 3 months. Cardiff were promoted to the Premier League at the end of the season.

Ward made his return in the opening game of the following season, a 2–0 loss at Bournemouth. He scored his first Premier League goal in a 2–3 defeat to Arsenal on 2 September 2018. Cardiff, however, were eventually relegated as Ward endured an injury hit season managing to make 16 appearances in total.

Ward missed the first month of the 2019–20 Championship season through injury, making his comeback in a 1–0 victory over Middlesbrough, followed by his first goal of the season at Hull City in a 2–2 draw. This was followed by a brace at West Bromwich Albion on 5 October.

=== Return to Huddersfield ===
On 17 August 2020, Ward re-joined Huddersfield Town, signing a three-year deal. On 22 January 2022, he scored a hat-trick in a 4–3 victory away to Reading – Huddersfield's first league hat-trick since Ward himself scored one in 2014.

Ward was released upon the expiration of his contract at the end of the 2024–25 season.

== Career statistics ==
As of end of 2024–25 season

Appearances and goals by club, season and competition
Club	Season	League			FA Cup		League Cup		Other		Total	
Club	Season	Division	Apps	Goals	Apps	Goals	Apps	Goals	Apps	Goals	Apps	Goals
Bolton Wanderers	2009–10	Premier League	2	0	0	0	0	0	–		2	0
Swindon Town (loan)	2009–10	League One	30	9	1	0	0	0	1 (Note: Appearance(s) in League One play-offs)	0	32	9
Coventry City (loan)	2010–11	Championship	5	0	0	0	0	0	–		5	0
Huddersfield Town (loan)	2010–11	League One	7	3	0	0	0	0	3	1	10	4
Huddersfield Town	2011–12	League One	39	4	1	0	2	1	5 (Note: Two appearances in Football League Trophy, three appearances in League One play-offs)	0	47	5
Huddersfield Town	2012–13	Championship	28	2	0	0	1	0	–		29	2
Huddersfield Town	2013–14	Championship	38	10	2	0	0	0	–		40	10
Huddersfield Town	2014–15	Championship	12	0	0	0	2	0	–		14	0
Huddersfield Town	Total		117	16	3	0	5	1	5	0	130	17
Rotherham United (loan)	2014–15	Championship	1	0	0	0	0	0	–		1	0
Rotherham United	2014–15	Championship	15	3	0	0	0	0	–		15	3
Rotherham United	2015–16	Championship	34	4	1	0	1	0	–		36	4
Rotherham United	2016–17	Championship	41	11	1	1	1	0	–		43	12
Rotherham United	Total		90	18	2	1	2	0	0	0	94	19
Cardiff City	2017–18	Championship	18	4	0	0	2	0	–		20	4
Cardiff City	2018–19	Premier League	14	1	1	0	1	0	–		16	1
Cardiff City	2019–20	Championship	28	8	3	1	0	0	2 (Note: Appearance(s) in Championship play-offs)	0	33	8
Cardiff City	Total		60	13	4	1	3	0	2	0	68	13
Huddersfield Town	2020–21	Championship	19	1	0	0	1	0	–		20	1
Huddersfield Town	2021–22	Championship	40	14	3	0	1	0	3	0	47	14
Huddersfield Town	2022–23	Championship	36	5	0	0	0	0	—		36	5
Huddersfield Town	2023–24	Championship	21	3	0	0	0	0	—		21	3
Huddersfield Town	2024–25	League One	13	0	1	0	2	1	4 (Note: Appearance(s) in EFL Trophy)	2	20	3
Huddersfield Town	Total		129	23	4	0	4	1	7	2	144	26
Career total			441	82	14	2	14	2	18	3	487	88

== Honours ==
Huddersfield Town

- Football League One play-offs: 2012

Cardiff City

- EFL Championship runner-up: 2017–18

Individual

- Rotherham United Player of the Year: 2016–17
- Rotherham United Players' Player of the Year: 2016–17
