= Josh Koroma =

Footballer (born 1998)

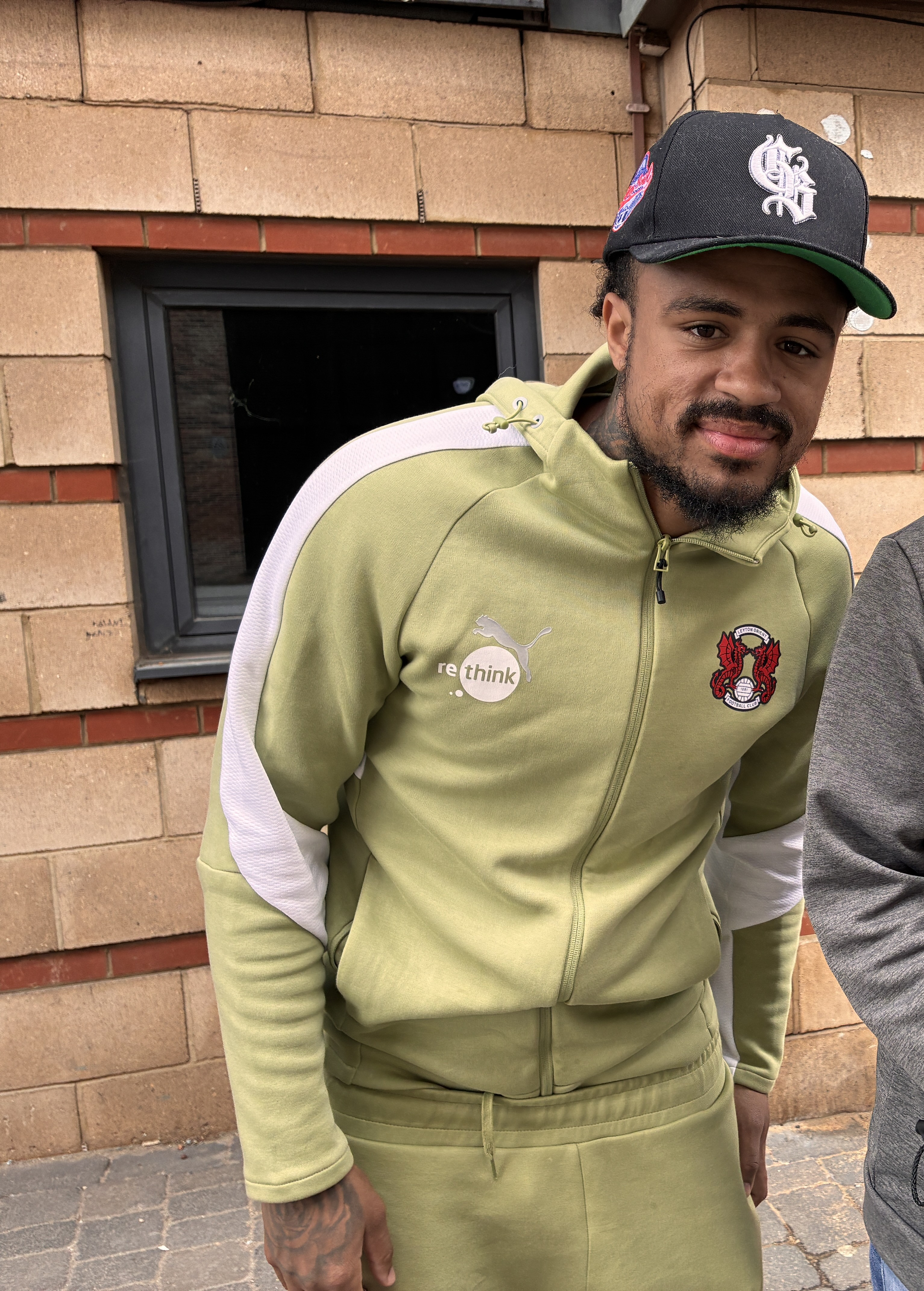
- Koroma in 2025

Personal information
- Full name: Joshua Abdulai Koroma
- Date of birth: 9 November 1998 (age 27)
- Place of birth: Southwark, England
- Height: 5 ft 10 in (1.78 m)
- Position: Forward

Team information
- Current team: Chesterfield (on loan from Leyton Orient)
- Number: 37

Youth career
- 2010–2016: Athenlay F.C
- –2016: Leyton Orient

Senior career*
Years	Team	Apps	(Gls)
2016–2019	Leyton Orient	95	(18)
2019–2025	Huddersfield Town	156	(33)
2020	→ Rotherham United (loan)	5	(0)
2022–2023	→ Portsmouth (loan)	16	(2)
2025–	Leyton Orient	30	(3)
2026–	→ Chesterfield (loan)	13	(4)

International career
2018	England C	1	(0)
2024–	Sierra Leone	2	(0)
- * Club domestic league appearances and goals as of 21:23, 1 November 2026

Joshua Abdulai Koroma (born 9 November 1998) is a professional footballer who plays as a forward for EFL League Two club Chesterfield, on loan from EFL League One club Leyton Orient. Born in England, he plays for the Sierra Leone national team.

== Career ==
=== Leyton Orient ===
Koroma made his first-team debut for Leyton Orient on 9 April 2016 as a second-half substitute in a 3–0 league defeat away to Barnet. He scored his first goals on 4 March 2017 with a hat-trick in a 4–0 win away to Newport County.

=== Huddersfield Town ===
Koroma signed for newly relegated EFL Championship club Huddersfield Town on 21 June 2019 on a three-year contract with the option of a further year for an undisclosed fee.

On 31 January 2020, Koroma joined Rotherham United on a six-month loan deal.

==== 2020–21 ====
He scored his first goal for Huddersfield in a 2–1 win at Swansea City on 17 October 2020. On the 8 December he scored for the third consecutive home game in the 2–0 home victory over Sheffield Wednesday. In the same game he injured a hamstring and was out for over 4 months. He returned for the final four games of the season, in which he scored in the away 5–2 defeat to Blackburn Rovers and 2–2 draw away to Reading FC.

==== Portsmouth (loan) ====
On 1 September 2022, Koroma joined EFL League One side Portsmouth on a season-long loan, reuniting him with Danny Cowley, who managed him at Huddersfield. On 11 January 2023, Portsmouth opted to end Koroma's loan.

Koroma was released by Huddersfield Town at the end of the 2024–25 season.

=== Leyton Orient ===
Koroma returned to Leyton Orient on 16 July 2025, signing a three year contract.

== International career ==
Koroma made his first appearance for Sierra Leone on the 10th June 2024 in the CAF Qualifiers First Round for the World Cup 2026 against Burkina Faso as a substitute on the 78th minute for Augustus Kargbo.

== Personal life ==
Koroma is of Sierra Leonean descent. He has two sisters, Chloe and Hayley. Raised in Peckham, South London, he played football from 3 years old

== Career statistics ==
As of end of 2024–25 season

Appearances and goals by club, season and competition
Club	Season	League			FA Cup		EFL Cup		Other		Total	
Club	Season	Division	Apps	Goals	Apps	Goals	Apps	Goals	Apps	Goals	Apps	Goals
Leyton Orient	2015–16	League Two	3	0	0	0	0	0	0	0	3	0
Leyton Orient	2016–17	League Two	22	3	0	0	0	0	2 (Note: Appearances in Football League Trophy)	0	24	3
Leyton Orient	2017–18	National League	31	4	0	0	—		3 (Note: Appearances in FA Trophy)	2	34	6
Leyton Orient	2018–19	National League	39	11	1	0	—		5	0	45	11
Leyton Orient	Total		95	18	1	0	0	0	10	2	106	20
Huddersfield Town	2019–20	Championship	7	0	1	0	1	0	—		9	0
Huddersfield Town	2020–21	Championship	20	8	0	0	1	0	—		21	8
Huddersfield Town	2021–22	Championship	34	4	2	1	2	0	—		38	5
Huddersfield Town	2022–23	Championship	19	4	0	0	1	0	—		20	4
Huddersfield Town	2023–24	Championship	39	6	1	0	0	0	—		40	6
Huddersfield Town	2024–25	League One	37	11	0	0	2	1	1	0	40	12
Huddersfield Town	Total		156	33	4	1	7	1	1	0	168	35
Rotherham United (loan)	2019–20	League One	5	0	—		—		—		5	0
Portsmouth (loan)	2022–23	League One	16	2	3	0	0	0	5	3	24	5
Career total			272	53	8	1	7	1	16	5	303	58

== Honours ==
Leyton Orient

- National League: 2018–19
- FA Trophy runner-up: 2018–19
