= Bangor Rangers F.C. =

Association football club in Northern Ireland

Bangor Rangers
- Full name: Bangor Rangers Football Club
- Nickname: The Wee Gers
- Founded: 1967
- Ground: Aurora Leisure Centre; 2 Valentines Road, Bangor, Co Down
- Chairman: Alan Thompson
- Manager: Stephen Willis
- League: NAFL Division 2B
- 2016-17: 4th

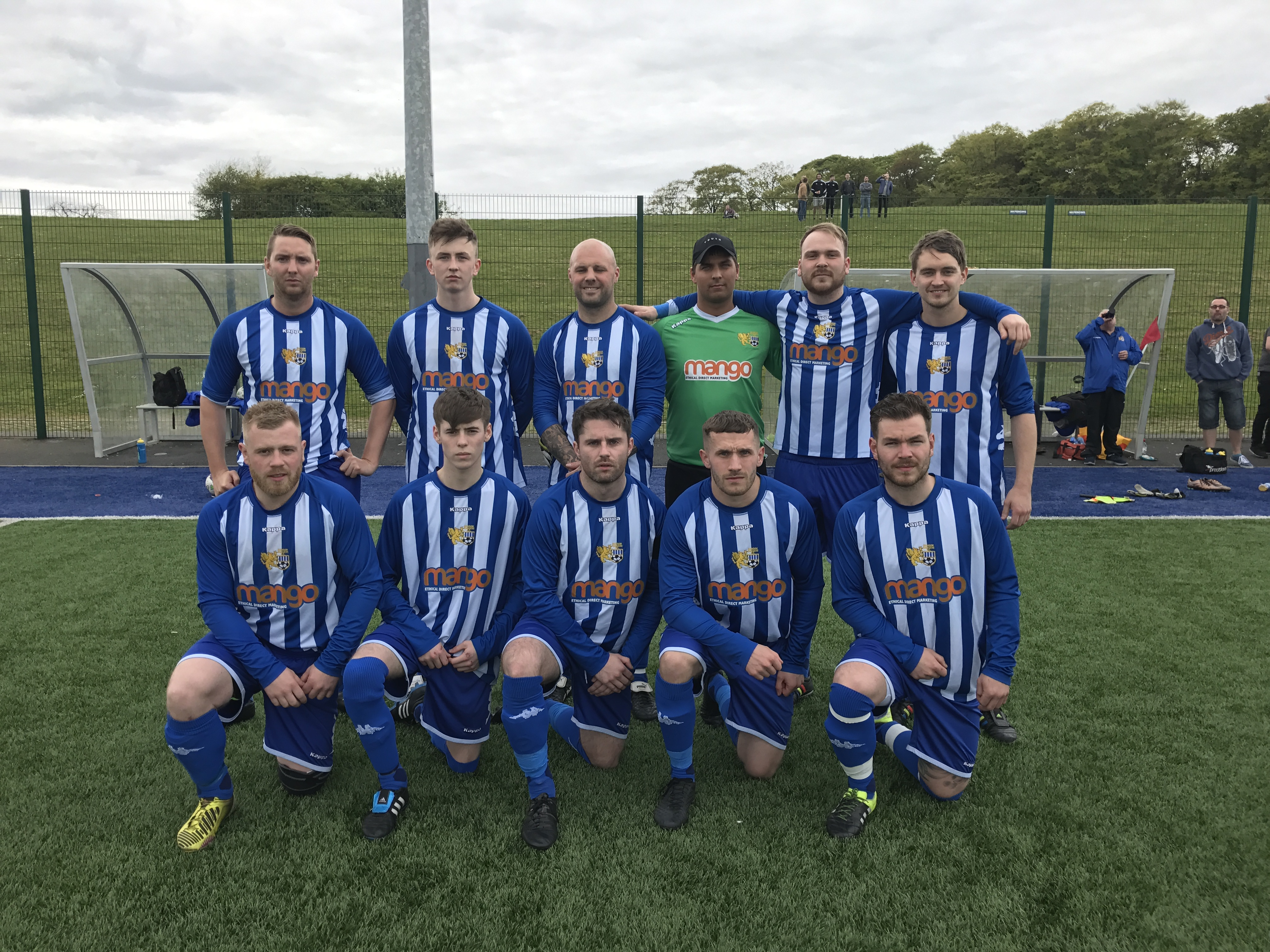
Bangor Rangers 2017

Bangor Rangers is a Northern Irish junior level football club playing in Division 2B of the Northern Amateur Football League in Northern Ireland. Their home ground is at Aurora Leisure Centre in Bangor. As well as the first XI, the club also has a second team playing in NAFL Division 3C. They also have youth teams playing at various age groups from under 17 and below. They compete in various of leagues such as ABYDL, South Belfast and South East Antrim. The club was started in Bangor Baptist Church and joined the Amateur League in 1986.
