= Josh Ruffels =

English association footballer (born 1993)

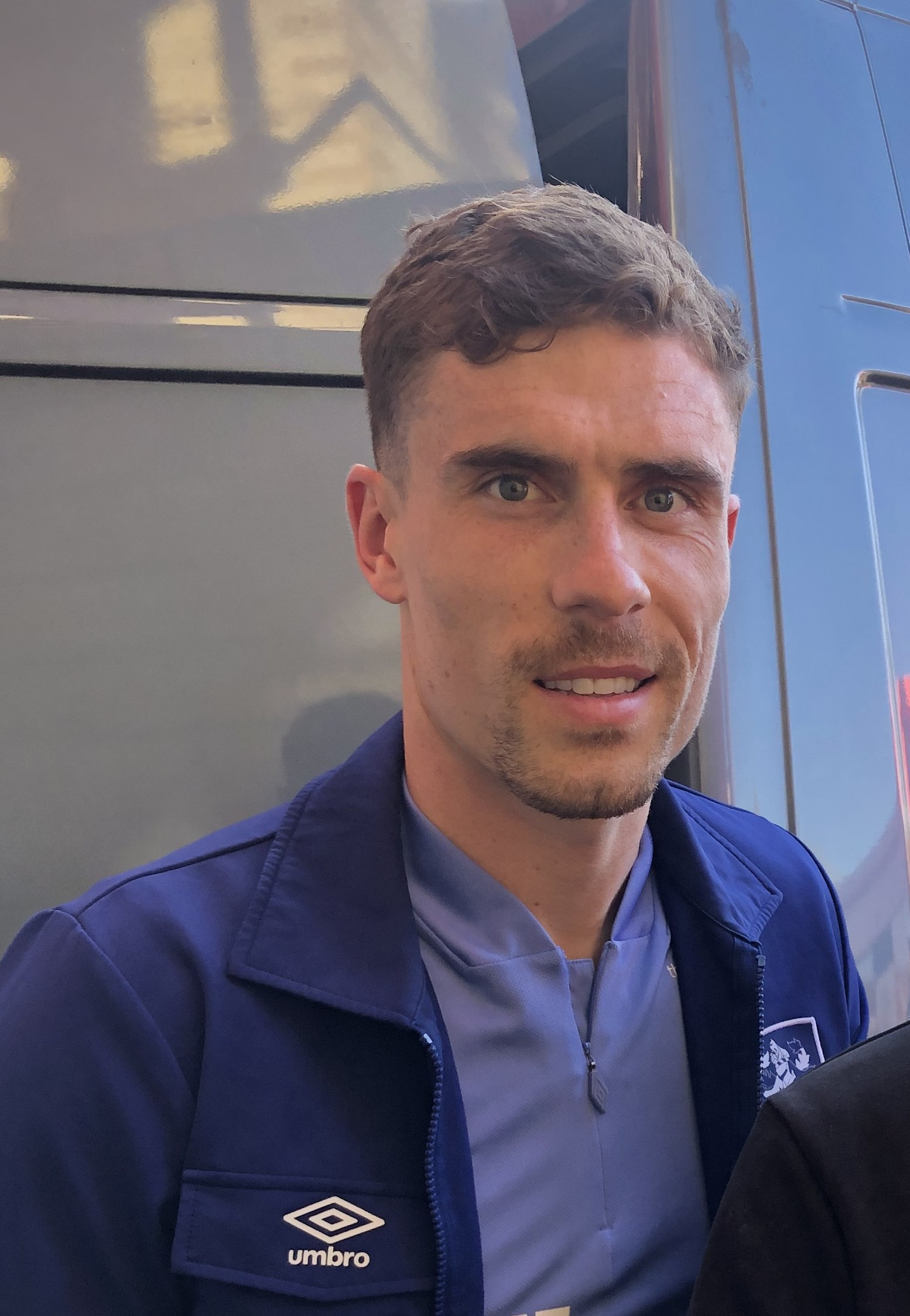
- Ruffels in 2025.

Personal information
- Full name: Joshua Andrew Bernard Ruffels
- Date of birth: 23 October 1993 (age 33)
- Place of birth: Oxford, England
- Height: 5 ft 10 in (1.78 m)
- Position: Left-back

Team information
- Current team: Shrewsbury Town
- Number: 3

Youth career
- –2011: Coventry City

Senior career*
Years	Team	Apps	(Gls)
2011–2013	Coventry City	1	(0)
2013–2021	Oxford United	257	(21)
2021–2025	Huddersfield Town	74	(3)
2025–	Shrewsbury Town	28	(2)
- * Club domestic league appearances and goals as of 17:58, 30 May 2026 (UTC)

Joshua Andrew Bernard Ruffels (born 23 October 1993) is an English professional footballer who plays as a left-back for EFL League Two club Shrewsbury Town.

== Early life ==
Ruffels was born in Oxford, Oxfordshire.

== Career ==
=== Coventry City ===
Ruffels made his first-team debut for Coventry City as a substitute on 16 August 2011 in a 2–1 defeat to Crystal Palace in the Championship, coming on to replace injured Gary McSheffrey after 18 minutes. He was released by Coventry at the end of the 2012–13 season.

=== Oxford United ===
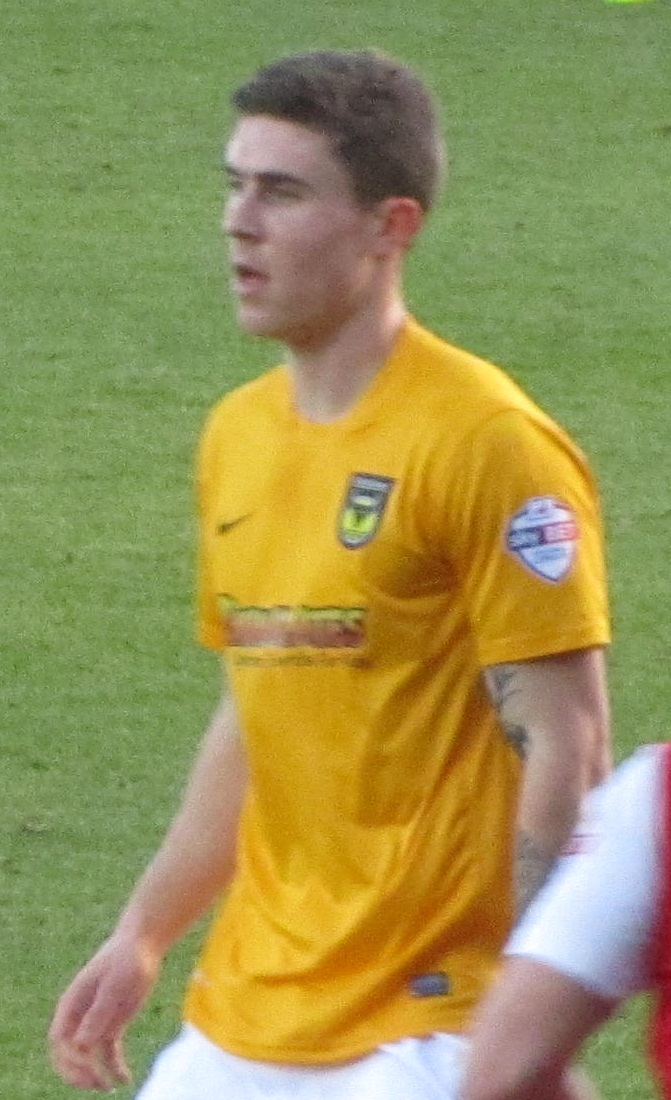
Ruffels playing for Oxford United in 2013.

Oxford United signed Ruffels on a free transfer on 30 July 2013. He made his debut as a substitute in a 3–1 league win over Torquay United on 17 August 2013 and his first starting appearance in a 2–1 home defeat to Portsmouth in the Football League Trophy on 8 October 2013. He scored his first senior goal in a 1–1 League Two draw versus Bury on 4 February 2014. On 17 April 2014, Ruffels signed a new contract keeping him at the club for a further two years. Nine days later, he was voted 'Young Player of the Year' after he established himself in the first team in his first full season for the club. On 20 October 2017, Ruffles agreed a new contract keeping him at Oxford until the end of the 2019–20 season, with an additional one-year option available. Ruffels won the Supporters' Player of the Year Award for the 2018–19 season. Signed as a midfielder, he now plays at left back.

=== Huddersfield Town ===
Ruffels agreed to join EFL Championship club Huddersfield Town on 1 July 2021. After contracting COVID-19 just as the season was about to commence in August 2021, Ruffels had to miss a lot of the early part of the season, but he finally made his Terriers debut as a substitute in their 3–2 win over Blackburn Rovers on 28 September 2021, where he also became the 1,000th player to play for Huddersfield Town.

He scored his first goals for Huddersfield when he scored twice in a 2–1 win at Queens Park Rangers on 8 November 2022.

He was released by the club at the end of the 2024–25 season.

=== Shrewsbury Town ===
Following his release from Huddersfield, Ruffles joined League Two side Shrewsbury Town in October 2025, reuniting with manager Michael Appleton, after their spell together at Oxford United. He made his debut for the club on 18 October 2025, in a 1–0 win against Crawley Town. He scored his first goal for the club on 8 November 2025, in a 3–1 defeat to Crewe Alexandra.

On 29 May 2026, he signed a new contract despite reported interest from other clubs.

== Career statistics ==
As of end of 2025–26 season

Appearances and goals by club, season and competition
Club	Season	League			FA Cup		League Cup		Other		Total	
Club	Season	Division	Apps	Goals	Apps	Goals	Apps	Goals	Apps	Goals	Apps	Goals
Coventry City	2010–11	Championship	0	0	0	0	0	0	—		0	0
Coventry City	2011–12	Championship	1	0	1	0	0	0	—		2	0
Coventry City	2012–13	League One	0	0	0	0	0	0	0	0	0	0
Coventry City	Total		1	0	1	0	0	0	0	0	2	0
Oxford United	2013–14	League Two	29	1	5	0	0	0	1 (Note: Appearance(s) in Football League Trophy)	0	35	1
Oxford United	2014–15	League Two	33	0	1	0	2	0	1	0	37	0
Oxford United	2015–16	League Two	16	0	1	0	2	0	3	0	22	0
Oxford United	2016–17	League One	20	2	3	1	1	0	6 (Note: Appearances in EFL Trophy)	0	30	3
Oxford United	2017–18	League One	38	5	1	0	1	0	5	0	45	5
Oxford United	2018–19	League One	44	4	3	0	2	0	3	0	52	4
Oxford United	2019–20	League One	35	3	4	0	4	0	5 (Note: Two appearances in EFL Trophy, three appearances in League One play-offs)	0	48	3
Oxford United	2020–21	League One	42	6	1	1	1	0	4 (Note: Two appearances in EFL Trophy, two appearances in League One play-offs)	0	48	7
Oxford United	Total		257	21	19	2	13	0	28	0	317	23
Huddersfield Town	2021–22	Championship	8	0	3	0	0	0	0	0	11	0
Huddersfield Town	2022–23	Championship	33	3	0	0	0	0	—		33	3
Huddersfield Town	2023–24	Championship	11	0	0	0	0	0	—		11	0
Huddersfield Town	2024–25	League One	22	0	0	0	1	1	2	0	25	1
Huddersfield Town	Total		74	3	3	0	1	1	2	0	80	4
Shrewsbury Town	2025–26	League Two	28	2	3	0	0	0	1	0	32	2
Career total			360	26	26	2	14	1	31	0	431	29

== Honours ==
Oxford United

- Football League/EFL Trophy runner-up: 2015–16, 2016–17
