= Mustapha Olagunju =

English footballer

Personal information
- Full name: Mustapha Oluwatosin Olagunju
- Date of birth: 1 January 2002 (age 24)
- Place of birth: Plumstead, England
- Height: 6 ft 2 in (1.89 m)
- Position: Centre-back

Team information
- Current team: Ebbsfleet United
- Number: 24

Youth career
- XYZ Academy
- Kent Football United
- 2018–2020: Huddersfield Town

Senior career*
Years	Team	Apps	(Gls)
2020–2024	Huddersfield Town	0	(0)
2020	→ Tadcaster Albion (loan)	2	(0)
2020	→ Welling United (loan)	7	(0)
2021	→ Port Vale (loan)	6	(0)
2023–2024	→ Ebbsfleet United (loan)	9	(0)
2024	→ Crawley Town (loan)	1	(0)
2024–	Ebbsfleet United	59	(4)
2024	→ Hemel Hempstead Town (loan)	3	(0)
- * Club domestic league appearances and goals as of 19:39, 30 April 2026 (UTC)

Mustapha Oluwatosin Olagunju (born 1 January 2002) is an English professional footballer who plays as a centre-back for National League South club Ebbsfleet United.

Olagunju turned professional at Huddersfield Town in August 2019. He played on loan for Tadcaster Albion, Welling United, Port Vale, Ebbsfleet United and Crawley Town, before being released in 2024. He signed with Ebbsfleet United in September 2024 and was loaned to Hemel Hempstead Town.

== Career ==
=== Huddersfield Town ===
Born in Plumstead, London, Olagunju started his football career at the XYZ Academy, before moving to Kent Football United and then Huddersfield Town after impressing the "Terriers" in a trial game against Barnsley. He joined Huddersfield as an attacking midfielder but was converted to playing at centre-back under the stewardship of Leigh Bromby and Emyr Humphreys. He was promoted into Dean Whitehead's U19 team after starting 31 games for the U17 side. He turned professional at the club in August 2019, signing a two-year contract. Manager Danny Cowley invited him to train with the first team at a camp in Dubai in November 2019.

On 10 January 2020, he moved to Tadcaster Albion of the Northern Premier League Division One West on a one-month loan to gain first-team experience. He started two games for the "Brewers". He joined Welling United on loan on 30 October 2020, along with Jaheim Headley. He made his National League South debut the next day in a 2–1 defeat at Eastbourne Borough. He played a total of seven games for the "Wings".

Olagunju made his senior debut for Huddersfield Town on 9 January 2021, when he started in their 3–2 FA Cup third round defeat to Plymouth Argyle at Kirklees Stadium after manager Carlos Corberán rested all 11 players who started the previous Championship fixture. He was booked in the fifth minute and substituted after 77 minutes. On 1 February 2021, he joined League Two side Port Vale on loan until the end of the 2020–21 season. He made his EFL debut on 20 February, in a 1–1 draw at Leyton Orient, and manager Darrell Clarke said that "he did all right". In April 2021, he signed a new contract at Huddersfield Town to keep him at the club until June 2024. However, he sustained a major knee injury – a complicated fracture to his kneecap – in July 2021 and spent the following 20 months in recovery. He played a reserve team game in February 2023, stating after the match that "I have to keep building on that and keep improving as I get back in touch with the game".

On 24 October 2023, he joined National League side Ebbsfleet United on a three-month loan deal. He returned to Huddersfield in January 2024 at the end of his loan spell having played nine games and missed six due to injury. On 1 February 2024, he joined League Two club Crawley Town on loan until the end of the 2023–24 season in what Huddersfield academy manager Jon Worthington called "a really interesting challenge". He played one game for Crawley and was released upon his return to Huddersfield.

=== Ebbsfleet United ===
On 2 September 2024, Olagunju returned to National League club Ebbsfleet United on a permanent contract. On 3 November 2024, he joined National League South side Hemel Hempstead Town on loan to aid the club during an injury crisis. He was praised by new Ebbsfleet manager Josh Wright in January 2025. Ebbsfleet were relegated with seven games left to play of the 2024–25 season. He was praised by manager Josh Wright in November 2025. He played 41 games in the 2025–26 season, being named on the National League South Team of the Week in January.

== Style of play ==
Olagunju is an aggressive centre-back who plays on the front foot and is comfortable in possession.

== Personal life ==
Born in England, Olagunju is of Nigerian descent. His brother, Saheed, plays for Wolverhampton Wanderers.

== Career statistics ==
As of match played 5 May 2025

Appearances and goals by club, season and competition
Club	Season	League			FA Cup		EFL Cup		Other		Total	
Club	Season	Division	Apps	Goals	Apps	Goals	Apps	Goals	Apps	Goals	Apps	Goals
Huddersfield Town	2020–21	EFL Championship	0	0	1	0	0	0	—		1	0
Huddersfield Town	2021–22	EFL Championship	0	0	0	0	0	0	0	0	0	0
Huddersfield Town	2022–23	EFL Championship	0	0	0	0	0	0	—		0	0
Huddersfield Town	2023–24	EFL Championship	0	0	0	0	0	0	—		0	0
Huddersfield Town	Total		0	0	1	0	0	0	0	0	1	0
Tadcaster Albion (loan)	2020–21	Northern Premier League; Division One North West	2	0	0	0	—		0	0	2	0
Welling United (loan)	2020–21	National League South	7	0	0	0	—		0	0	7	0
Port Vale (loan)	2020–21	EFL League Two	6	0	—		—		—		6	0
Ebbsfleet United (loan)	2023–24	National League	9	0	0	0	—		0	0	9	0
Crawley Town (loan)	2023–24	EFL League Two	1	0	—		—		—		1	0
Ebbsfleet United	2024–25	National League	24	2	0	0	—		4 (Note: Appearance(s) in the National League Cup)	0	28	2
Ebbsfleet United	2025–26	National League South	35	2	0	0	—		6 (Note: Cup games not specified)	0	41	2
Ebbsfleet United	2026–27	National League South	0	0	0	0	—		0	0	0	0
Ebbsfleet United	Total		59	4	0	0	0	0	10	0	69	4
Hemel Hempstead Town (loan)	2024–25	National League South	3	0	—		—		0	0	3	0
Career total			87	4	1	0	0	0	10	0	98	4
