= 2020–21 Huddersfield Town A.F.C. season =

Huddersfield Town A.F.C.
2020–21 season
- Chairman: Phil Hodgkinson
- Head Coach: Carlos Corberán
- Stadium: John Smith's Stadium
- Championship: 20th
- FA Cup: Third round (eliminated by Plymouth Argyle)
- EFL Cup: First round (eliminated by Rochdale)
- Top goalscorer: League: Josh Koroma (8); All: Josh Koroma (8)
- Biggest win: 3–0 vs Millwall (31 October 2020); 4–1 vs Swansea City (20 February 2021)
- Biggest defeat: 0–7 vs Norwich City (6 April 2021)
| Home colours | Away colours | Third colours |

The 2020–21 Huddersfield Town Football Club season was the club's 112th season in existence and second consecutive season in the EFL Championship. Huddersfield Town also competed in the FA Cup and the EFL Cup. The season covers the period from 23 July 2020 to 30 June 2021.

== Squad at the end of the season ==
Note: Flags indicate national team as defined under FIFA eligibility rules; some limited exceptions apply. Players may hold more than one non-FIFA nationality.

| No. | Pos. | Nation | Player |
|---|---|---|---|
| 2 | DF | ESP | Pipa |
| 3 | DF | ENG | Harry Toffolo |
| 4 | DF | ENG | Tommy Elphick |
| 5 | MF | ESP | Álex Vallejo |
| 6 | MF | ENG | Jonathan Hogg (Vice-captain) |
| 7 | MF | CUW | Juninho Bacuna |
| 8 | MF | ENG | Lewis O'Brien |
| 9 | MF | USA | Duane Holmes |
| 10 | MF | ENG | Alex Pritchard |
| 11 | FW | SEN | Oumar Niasse |
| 12 | DF | ENG | Richard Stearman |
| 13 | GK | CAN | Jayson Leutwiler |
| 14 | MF | NED | Carel Eiting (on loan from Ajax) |
| 15 | DF | IRL | Richard Keogh |
| 16 | FW | JAM | Rolando Aarons |
| 17 | DF | ENG | Demeaco Duhaney |
| 18 | FW | BEL | Isaac Mbenza |
| 19 | FW | ENG | Josh Koroma |
| 20 | FW | ENG | Sorba Thomas |
| 21 | FW | IRL | Danny Grant |
| 22 | FW | ENG | Fraizer Campbell |
| 23 | DF | SEN | Naby Sarr |
| 24 | FW | ENG | Kian Harratt |
| 25 | FW | ENG | Danny Ward |
| 26 | DF | GER | Christopher Schindler (Captain) |

| No. | Pos. | Nation | Player |
|---|---|---|---|
| 27 | DF | ENG | Romoney Crichlow |
| 28 | DF | ENG | Jaden Brown |
| 29 | DF | ENG | Aaron Rowe |
| 30 | DF | ENG | Ben Jackson (on loan at Bolton Wanderers) |
| 31 | GK | ENG | Ryan Schofield |
| 32 | GK | AUS | Jacob Chapman |
| 33 | MF | ENG | Josh Austerfield |
| 34 | MF | ENG | Matty Daly |
| 35 | DF | ENG | Rarmani Edmonds-Green |
| 36 | FW | ENG | Kieran Phillips |
| 37 | DF | ENG | Mustapha Olagunju (on loan at Port Vale) |
| 38 | DF | ENG | Jaheim Headley |
| 39 | FW | ENG | Micah Obiero (on loan at FC Halifax Town) |
| 40 | MF | FRA | Brahima Diarra |
| 41 | MF | WAL | Pat Jones |
| 42 | DF | SMA | Ilounga Pata |
| 44 | GK | POR | Joel Pereira (on loan from Manchester United) |
| 46 | DF | FRA | Loick Ayina |
| 47 | DF | ENG | Sam Sharrock-Peplow |
| 48 | MF | FRA | Etienne Camara |
| 49 | MF | ENG | Scott High |
| 50 | MF | ENG | Myles Bright |
| 51 | FW | ENG | Kit Elliott |
| 55 | FW | FRA | Yaya Sanogo |
| –– | MF | ENG | Reece Brown (on loan at Peterborough United) |

== Transfers ==
=== Transfers in ===
| Date | Position | Nationality | Name | From | Fee | Ref. |
|---|---|---|---|---|---|---|
| 13 July 2020 | CF | (England) | Kieran Phillips | (England) Everton | Free transfer | |
| 12 August 2020 | RW | (Northern Ireland) | Conor Falls | (Northern Ireland) Glentoran | Undisclosed | |
| 12 August 2020 | CM | (Northern Ireland) | Brodie Spencer | (Northern Ireland) Cliftonville | Undisclosed | |
| 12 August 2020 | CM | (England) | Sonny Whittingham | (England) Bradford City | Undisclosed | |
| 17 August 2020 | CF | (England) | Danny Ward | (Wales) Cardiff City | Free transfer | |
| 7 September 2020 | RB | (Spain) | Pipa | (Spain) Espanyol | Undisclosed | |
| 11 September 2020 | CB | (Senegal) | Naby Sarr | (England) Charlton Athletic | Free transfer | |
| 18 October 2020 | DM | (Spain) | Álex Vallejo | Free agent | Free transfer | |
| 22 October 2020 | MF | (France) | Etienne Camara | (France) Angers | Free transfer | |
| 23 October 2020 | MF | (Wales) | Evander Grubb | (England) Bristol Manor Farm | Free transfer | |
| 2 January 2021 | RW | (Republic of Ireland) | Danny Grant | (Republic of Ireland) Bohemians | Free transfer | |
| 7 January 2021 | LW | (Jamaica) | Rolando Aarons | (England) Newcastle United | Free transfer | |
| 13 January 2021 | RW | (Wales) | Sorba Thomas | (England) Boreham Wood | Undisclosed | |
| 19 January 2021 | CB | (Republic of Ireland) | Richard Keogh | (England) Milton Keynes Dons | Undisclosed | |
| 25 January 2021 | MF | (United States) | Duane Holmes | (England) Derby County | Undisclosed | |
| 1 February 2021 | GK | (Canada) | Jayson Leutwiler | Free agent | Free transfer | |
| 24 February 2021 | CF | (France) | Yaya Sanogo | Free agent | Free transfer | |
| 26 March 2021 | CF | (Senegal) | Oumar Niasse | Free agent | Free transfer | |

=== Loans in ===
| Date from | Position | Nationality | Name | From | Date until | Ref. |
|---|---|---|---|---|---|---|
| 29 August 2020 | GK | (Portugal) | Joel Pereira | (England) Manchester United | End of season | |
| 19 September 2020 | DM | (Netherlands) | Carel Eiting | (Netherlands) Ajax | End of season | |

=== Loans out ===
| Date from | Position | Nationality | Name | To | Date until | Ref. |
|---|---|---|---|---|---|---|
| 31 July 2020 | FW | (England) | Kit Elliott | (Republic of Ireland) Cork City | 1 December 2020 | |
| 3 August 2020 | CM | (England) | Scott High | (England) Shrewsbury Town | 29 December 2020 | |
| 13 August 2020 | LW | (England) | Will McCamley | (England) South Shields | 1 January 2021 | |
| 17 August 2020 | CM | (England) | Reece Brown | (England) Peterborough United | End of season | |
| 16 October 2020 | CF | (England) | Micah Obiero | (England) Carlisle United | 1 January 2021 | |
| 24 October 2020 | CF | (England) | Kian Harratt | (England) Guiseley | 15 December 2020 | |
| 30 October 2020 | LB | (England) | Jaheim Headley | (England) Welling United | 3 January 2021 | |
| 30 October 2020 | CB | (England) | Mustapha Olagunju | (England) Welling United | 3 January 2021 | |
| 14 December 2020 | CM | (England) | Josh Austerfield | (England) Hyde United | 11 January 2021 | |
| 16 January 2021 | LB | (England) | Ben Jackson | (England) Bolton Wanderers | End of season | |
| 1 February 2021 | CB | (England) | Mustapha Olagunju | (England) Port Vale | End of season | |
| 9 February 2021 | GK | (Uganda) | Giosue Bellagambi | (England) Ebbsfleet United | 7 March 2021 | |
| 29 March 2021 | CF | (England) | Micah Obiero | (England) FC Halifax Town | End of season | |

=== Transfers out ===
| Date | Position | Nationality | Name | To | Fee | Ref. |
|---|---|---|---|---|---|---|
| 1 July 2020 | MF | (England) | Tim Akinola | (England) Arsenal | Released | |
| 1 July 2020 | CF | (England) | Olly Dyson | (England) York City | Released | |
| 1 July 2020 | MF | (England) | Andrew Ijiwole | (England) Edgware Town | Released | |
| 1 July 2020 | LW | (England) | Darnell Mintus | Unattached | Released | |
| 1 July 2020 | GK | (England) | Scott Moloney | (England) Barrow | Released | |
| 1 July 2020 | CB | (Slovenia) | Jon Gorenc Stanković | (Austria) Sturm Graz | Free transfer | |
| 1 July 2020 | RB | (England) | Danny Simpson | (England) Bristol City | Released | |
| 1 July 2020 | LB | (Scotland) | Cameron Taylor | (Scotland) St Cuthbert Wanderers | Free transfer | |
| 24 July 2020 | GK | (England) | Joel Coleman | (England) Fleetwood Town | Released | |
| 24 July 2020 | CF | (Democratic Republic of the Congo) | Elias Kachunga | (England) Sheffield Wednesday | Released | |
| 24 July 2020 | CF | (England) | Rekeil Pyke | (England) Shrewsbury Town | Released | |
| 29 July 2020 | RB | (Uganda) | Herbert Bockhorn | (Germany) VfL Bochum | Mutual consent | |
| 5 September 2020 | RM | (Northern Ireland) | Dom Tear | (England) FC Halifax Town | Released | |
| 7 September 2020 | LW | (Egypt) | Ramadan Sobhi | (Egypt) Pyramids | Undisclosed | |
| 9 September 2020 | CF | (Benin) | Steve Mounié | (France) Stade Brest | Undisclosed | |
| 25 September 2020 | RB | (Kosovo) | Florent Hadergjonaj | (Turkey) Kasımpaşa | Undisclosed | |
| 2 October 2020 | GK | (England) | Harrison Davison-Hale | (England) FC Halifax Town | Free transfer | |
| 15 October 2020 | CF | (England) | Karlan Grant | (England) West Bromwich Albion | Undisclosed | |
| 16 October 2020 | CB | (Netherlands) | Terence Kongolo | (England) Fulham | Undisclosed | |
| 8 January 2021 | CF | (Germany) | Collin Quaner | (Scotland) St Mirren | Released | |
| 15 January 2021 | GK | (England) | Ben Hamer | (Wales) Swansea City | Undisclosed | |
| 1 February 2021 | RW | (France) | Adama Diakhaby | (France) Amiens | Undisclosed | |

== Pre-season and friendlies ==
Win Draw Loss Fixtures

| 26 August 2020 Friendly | Huddersfield Town | 2–1 | Bradford City | Huddersfield |
| 15:00 BST | Grant 11'; O'Donnell 65' (o.g.) | Report | Mottley-Henry 2' | Stadium: John Smith's Stadium; Attendance: 0 (Played behind closed doors) |

| 29 August 2020 Friendly | Huddersfield Town | 3–3 | Manchester United Under-23s | Huddersfield |
| 15:00 BST | Pritchard 20'; Bacuna 34'; Koroma 62' | Report | Helm 16'; Elanga 18'; Mejbri 74' | Stadium: John Smith's Stadium; Attendance: 0 (Played behind closed doors) |

== Competitions ==
=== Overview ===
| Competition | First match | Last match | Starting round | Final position | Record | | | | | | | |
| Competition | First match | Last match | Starting round | Final position | Pld | W | D | L | GF | GA | GD | Win % |
|---|---|---|---|---|---|---|---|---|---|---|---|---|
| EFL Championship | 12 September 2020 | 8 May 2021 | Matchday 1 | 20th | 46 | 12 | 13 | 21 | 50 | 71 | −21 | 26.09 |
| FA Cup | 9 January 2021 | 9 January 2021 | Third round | Third round | 1 | 0 | 0 | 1 | 2 | 3 | −1 | 0.00 |
| EFL Cup | 5 September 2020 | 5 September 2020 | First round | First round | 1 | 0 | 0 | 1 | 0 | 1 | −1 | 0.00 |
| Total | | | | | 48 | 12 | 13 | 23 | 52 | 75 | −23 | 25.00 |

Last updated: 8 May 2021
Source: Competitions

=== EFL Championship ===
==== League table ====
| Pos | Team | Pld | W | D | L | GF | GA | GD | Pts | Promotion, qualification or relegation |
|---|---|---|---|---|---|---|---|---|---|---|
| 17 | Nottingham Forest | 46 | 12 | 16 | 18 | 37 | 45 | −8 | 52 | |
| 18 | Birmingham City | 46 | 13 | 13 | 20 | 37 | 61 | −24 | 52 | |
| 19 | Bristol City | 46 | 15 | 6 | 25 | 46 | 68 | −22 | 51 | |
| 20 | Huddersfield Town | 46 | 12 | 13 | 21 | 50 | 71 | −21 | 49 | |
| 21 | Derby County | 46 | 11 | 11 | 24 | 36 | 58 | −22 | 44 | |
| 22 | Wycombe Wanderers (R) | 46 | 11 | 10 | 25 | 39 | 69 | −30 | 43 | Relegation to EFL League One |
| 23 | Rotherham United (R) | 46 | 11 | 9 | 26 | 44 | 60 | −16 | 42 | Relegation to EFL League One |

Source: EFL Official Website
Rules for classification: 1) Points; 2) Goal difference; 3) Number of goals scored; 4) Head-to-head results; 5) Wins; 6) Away goals; 7) Penalty points (sec 9.5); 8) 12-point sending off offences
(R) Relegated

==== Results summary ====
| Overall | | | | | | | | Home | | | | | | Away | | | | | |
| Pld | W | D | L | GF | GA | GD | Pts | W | D | L | GF | GA | GD | W | D | L | GF | GA | GD |
|---|---|---|---|---|---|---|---|---|---|---|---|---|---|---|---|---|---|---|---|
| 46 | 12 | 13 | 21 | 50 | 71 | −21 | 49 | 8 | 7 | 8 | 28 | 23 | +5 | 4 | 6 | 13 | 22 | 48 | −26 |

Last updated: 8 May 2021.

==== Results by matchday ====
| Matchday | 1 | 2 | 3 | 4 | 5 | 6 | 7 | 8 | 9 | 10 | 11 | 12 | 13 | 14 | 15 | 16 | 17 | 18 | 19 | 20 | 21 | 22 | 23 | 24 | 25 | 26 | 27 | 28 | 29 | 30 | 31 | 32 | 33 | 34 | 35 | 36 | 37 | 38 | 39 | 40 | 41 | 42 | 43 | 44 | 45 | 46 |
|---|---|---|---|---|---|---|---|---|---|---|---|---|---|---|---|---|---|---|---|---|---|---|---|---|---|---|---|---|---|---|---|---|---|---|---|---|---|---|---|---|---|---|---|---|---|---|
| Ground | H | A | H | A | A | H | H | A | A | H | H | A | A | H | A | H | H | A | A | H | A | H | H | A | H | A | H | A | H | A | H | A | A | H | H | A | A | H | A | H | H | A | H | A | H | A |
| Result | L | L | W | D | W | W | L | L | W | L | D | L | D | W | L | W | W | L | D | W | L | W | L | L | L | L | D | D | L | L | W | L | L | D | D | W | D | D | L | D | L | W | L | L | D | D |
| Position | 17 | 21 | 16 | 18 | 13 | 9 | 14 | 16 | 12 | 13 | 13 | 16 | 16 | 13 | 16 | 13 | 12 | 14 | 14 | 12 | 14 | 12 | 13 | 14 | 14 | 14 | 14 | 17 | 18 | 19 | 18 | 19 | 19 | 19 | 18 | 18 | 17 | 18 | 19 | 19 | 19 | 18 | 20 | 20 | 20 | 20 |

Updated to match(es) played on 8 May 2021. Source:
A = Away; H = Home; W = Win; D = Draw; L = Loss

==== Matches ====
The 2020–21 season fixtures were released on 21 August.

| 12 September 2020 1 | Huddersfield Town | 0–1 | Norwich City | Huddersfield |
| 15:00 BST | Brown (yellow card) 88' | | Dowell (yellow card) 58'; Cantwell (yellow card) 77'; Idah 81' (yellow card) 90+1' | Stadium: John Smith's Stadium; Attendance: 0 (Played behind closed doors); Referee: Geoff Eltringham |

| 19 September 2020 2 | Brentford | 3–0 | Huddersfield Town | Brentford |
| 15:00 BST | Nørgaard (yellow card) 40'; Dasilva 58'; Forss 86'; Mbeumo 90+1' | Report | | Stadium: Brentford Community Stadium; Attendance: 0 (Played behind closed doors); Referee: Craig Pawson |

| 25 September 2020 3 | Huddersfield Town | 1–0 | Nottingham Forest | Huddersfield |
| 19:45 BST | Hogg (yellow card) 11'; Campbell 54'; Stearman (yellow card) 73' | Report | Sow (yellow card) 19'; Colback (yellow card) 29'; Ameobi (yellow card) 60'; McKenna (yellow card) 81' | Stadium: John Smith's Stadium; Attendance: 0 (Played behind closed doors); Referee: Oliver Langford |
Note: Live on Sky Sports

| 3 October 2020 4 | Rotherham United | 1–1 | Huddersfield Town | Rotherham |
| 15:00 BST | Wiles 33'; Mattock (yellow card) 80' | Report | Stearman (yellow card) 83'; MacDonald 90+6' (o.g.) | Stadium: AESSEAL New York Stadium; Attendance: 0 (Played behind closed doors); Referee: Andy Woolmer |

| 17 October 2020 5 | Swansea City | 1–2 | Huddersfield Town | Swansea |
| 15:00 BST | Ayew 33' (pen.); Bidwell (yellow card) 45+3' | | Bacuna (yellow card) 16'; Toffolo 23'; Hamer (yellow card) 32'; Mbenza (yellow card) 45+3'; Stearman (yellow card) 60'; Koroma 67' | Stadium: Liberty Stadium; Attendance: 0 (Played behind closed doors); Referee: Tony Harrington |

| 20 October 2020 6 | Huddersfield Town | 1–0 | Derby County | Huddersfield |
| 19:45 BST | Bacuna 53'; Campbell (yellow card) 87' | | Byrne (yellow card) 84'; Wisdom (yellow card) 90+1'; Waghorn (yellow card) 90+6' | Stadium: John Smith's Stadium; Attendance: 0 (Played behind closed doors); Referee: David Webb |

| 24 October 2020 7 | Huddersfield Town | 1–2 | Preston North End | Huddersfield |
| 15:00 BST | Campbell 8'; Schindler (yellow card) 41'; Stearman (yellow card) 44'; Sarr (red card) 78'; Koroma (yellow card) 87' | | Potts (yellow card) 44'; Browne 51', 53' (yellow card) 66'; Bauer (yellow card) 70'; Maguire (yellow card) 90+3'; Harrop (yellow card) 90+4' | Stadium: John Smith's Stadium; Attendance: 0 (Played behind closed doors); Referee: Joshua Smith |

| 28 October 2020 8 | Birmingham City | 2–1 | Huddersfield Town | Birmingham |
| 19:45 GMT | Garnder 27'; Šunjić (yellow card) 35'; San José (yellow card) 75'; Jutkiewicz 90' | Report | Diakhaby (yellow card) 19'; Mbenza 85' | Stadium: St Andrew's Trillion Trophy Stadium; Attendance: 0 (Played behind closed doors); Referee: Leigh Doughty |

| 31 October 2020 9 | Millwall | 0–3 | Huddersfield Town | Bermondsey |
| 15:00 GMT | Romeo (yellow card) 58'; Leonard (yellow card) 60' | | Koroma 18'; Pipa 89'; O'Brien 90+3' | Stadium: The Den; Attendance: 0 (Played behind closed doors); Referee: Gavin Ward |

| 3 November 2020 10 | Huddersfield Town | 1–2 | Bristol City | Huddersfield |
| 19:00 GMT | Koroma 43'; Sarr (yellow card) 72'; Hamer (yellow card) 75'; Hogg (yellow card) 90+1' | Report | Dasilva 77'; Paterson 83' | Stadium: John Smith's Stadium; Attendance: 0 (Played behind closed doors); Referee: Peter Bankes |

| 7 November 2020 11 | Huddersfield Town | 1–1 | Luton Town | Huddersfield |
| 15:00 GMT | Koroma (yellow card) 17'; Eiting 60' | Report | Bradley (yellow card) 10'; Moncur 21'; Rea (yellow card) 28'; Cranie (yellow card) 40'; Collins (yellow card) 84'; LuaLua (yellow card) 88' | Stadium: John Smith's Stadium; Attendance: 0 (Played behind closed doors); Referee: Oliver Langford |

| 21 November 2020 12 | Stoke City | 4–3 | Huddersfield Town | Stoke-on-Trent |
| 15:00 GMT | Campbell 31', 33'; Mikel (yellow card) 44'; Stearman 45' (o.g.); Clucas 57'; Smith (yellow card) 61' | Report | Eiting 24'; Mbenza 40'; Hogg (yellow card) 45+3'; Sarr 60' | Stadium: Bet365 Stadium; Attendance: 0 (Played behind closed doors); Referee: Jarred Gillett |

| 24 November 2020 13 | Wycombe Wanderers | 0–0 | Huddersfield Town | High Wycombe |
| 19:00 GMT | | | Sarr (yellow card) 44' | Stadium: Adams Park; Attendance: 0 (Played behind closed doors); Referee: Steve Martin |

| 28 November 2020 14 | Huddersfield Town | 3–2 | Middlesbrough | Huddersfield |
| 15:00 GMT | Eiting 37'; Campbell 45' (yellow card) 66'; Bacuna (yellow card) 68'; Sarr (yellow card) 83'; Koroma 85'; Hogg (yellow card) 90+5' | Report | Johnson 14'; McNair (yellow card) 56'; Howson (yellow card) 64'; Dijksteel (yellow card) 76'; Assombalonga 83' (pen.) | Stadium: John Smith's Stadium; Attendance: 0 (Played behind closed doors); Referee: John Brooks |

| 1 December 2020 15 | Cardiff City | 3–0 | Huddersfield Town | Cardiff |
| 19:00 GMT | Moore 35', 68'; Glatzel 85'; Bennett (yellow card) 90+3' | | Mbenza (yellow card) 87' | Stadium: Cardiff City Stadium; Attendance: 0 (Played behind closed doors); Referee: Kevin Friend |

| 5 December 2020 16 | Huddersfield Town | 2–0 | Queens Park Rangers | Huddersfield |
| 15:00 GMT | Koroma 3'; Toffolo 39' | Report | Ball (yellow card) 62'; Osayi-Samuel (yellow card) 71' | Stadium: John Smith's Stadium; Attendance: 0 (Played behind closed doors); Referee: Dean Whitestone |

| 8 December 2020 17 | Huddersfield Town | 2–0 | Sheffield Wednesday | Huddersfield |
| 19:45 GMT | Koroma 11'; Mbenza 24'; Bacuna (penalty missed) 49'; Toffolo (yellow card) 71' | | Palmer (yellow card) 22'; Harris (yellow card) 71'; Lees (yellow card) 86' | Stadium: John Smith's Stadium; Attendance: 0 (Played behind closed doors); Referee: Keith Stroud |

| 12 December 2020 18 | AFC Bournemouth | 5–0 | Huddersfield Town | Kings Park |
| 15:00 GMT | Solanke 8', 13'; Brooks (yellow card) 17' (goal) 21'; Stanislas 67'; Surridge 70' | Report | Toffolo (yellow card) 38' | Stadium: Vitality Stadium; Attendance: 1,200; Referee: Oliver Langford |

| 16 December 2020 19 | Coventry City | 0–0 | Huddersfield Town | Birmingham |
| 20:00 GMT | Hamer (yellow card) 90+1' | | Pipa (yellow card) 50' | Stadium: St Andrew's Trillion Trophy Stadium; Attendance: 0 (Played behind closed doors); Referee: Tim Robinson |
Note: Live on Sky Sports

| 19 December 2020 20 | Huddersfield Town | 2–0 | Watford | Huddersfield |
| 15:00 GMT | Campbell 9'; Schofield (yellow card) 21'; Capoue 33' (o.g.); Bacuna (yellow card) 87' | | Wilmot (yellow card) 34' | Stadium: John Smith's Stadium; Attendance: 0 (Played behind closed doors); Referee: Leigh Doughty |

| 26 December 2020 21 | Barnsley | 2–1 | Huddersfield Town | Barnsley |
| 15:00 GMT | Helik 21', 90+4' (yellow card) 30' | | Edmonds-Green 13' | Stadium: Oakwell; Attendance: 0 (Played behind closed doors); Referee: David Webb |

| 29 December 2020 22 | Huddersfield Town | 2–1 | Blackburn Rovers | Huddersfield |
| 19:45 GMT | Pipa (yellow card) 41'; Sarr 53', 90'; Campbell (yellow card) 55'; Hogg (yellow card) 67' | | Lenihan (yellow card) 50'; Gallagher 86'; Holtby (yellow card) 89' | Stadium: John Smith's Stadium; Attendance: 0 (Played behind closed doors); Referee: Matthew Donohue |

| 2 January 2021 23 | Huddersfield Town | 1–2 | Reading | Huddersfield |
| 15:00 GMT | Campbell 6'; Mbenza (yellow card) 44'; Toffolo (yellow card) 69' | | João 52', 65'; Holmes (yellow card) 63' | Stadium: John Smith's Stadium; Attendance: 0 (Played behind closed doors); Referee: Jeremy Simpson |

| 16 January 2021 24 | Watford | 2–0 | Huddersfield Town | Watford |
| 15:00 GMT | Deeney (yellow card) 30'; Cleverley 54'; Sierralta (yellow card) 56'; Chalobah (yellow card) 59'; Pedro 64' | | Campbell (yellow card) 40'; Crichlow (yellow card) 66' | Stadium: Vicarage Road; Attendance: 0 (Played behind closed doors); Referee: Michael Salisbury |

| 20 January 2021 25 | Huddersfield Town | 0–1 | Millwall | Huddersfield |
| 19:00 GMT | Campbell (penalty missed) 15' | Report | Malone 4'; McNamara (yellow card) 69'; Woods (yellow card) 80' | Stadium: John Smith's Stadium; Attendance: 0 (Played behind closed doors); Referee: Peter Bankes |

| 26 January 2021 26 | Bristol City | 2–1 | Huddersfield Town | Bristol |
| 19:00 GMT | Diédhiou (yellow card) 5' (goal) 22', 26'; Vyner (yellow card) 55'; Nagy (yellow card) 90+3' | | Bacuna 59' (yellow card) 90+3'; Pipa (yellow card) 74' | Stadium: Ashton Gate Stadium; Attendance: 0 (Played behind closed doors); Referee: Steve Martin |

| 30 January 2021 27 | Huddersfield Town | 1–1 | Stoke City | Huddersfield |
| 15:00 GMT | Pipa 5' | | Fletcher 24' (pen.); Norrington-Davies (red card) 45+3'; Mikel (yellow card) 90+3' | Stadium: John Smith's Stadium; Attendance: 0 (Played behind closed doors); Referee: Gavin Ward |
Note: Live on Sky Sports

| 6 February 2021 28 | Luton Town | 1–1 | Huddersfield Town | Luton |
| 15:00 GMT | Dewsbury-Hall (yellow card) 7'; Collins 11' | | O'Brien (yellow card) 23'; Pipa (yellow card) 53'; Hogg (yellow card) 62'; Sarr 74'; Toffolo (red card) 90+3' | Stadium: Kenilworth Road; Attendance: 0 (Played behind closed doors); Referee: Leigh Doughty |

| 13 February 2021 29 | Huddersfield Town | 2–3 | Wycombe Wanderers | Huddersfield |
| 15:00 GMT | Bacuna 18'; Mbenza 41' (yellow card) 57'; Pipa (yellow card) 62'; Holmes (yellow card) 79'; Hogg (yellow card) 86' | | Tafazolli (yellow card) 23'; Mehmeti 45+3'; Jacobson 63' (pen.); Grimmer (yellow card) 71'; Stewart (yellow card) 82'; Knight 87'; Ikpeazu (yellow card) 90+6' | Stadium: John Smith's Stadium; Attendance: 0 (Played behind closed doors); Referee: Keith Stroud |

| 16 February 2021 30 | Middlesbrough | 2–1 | Huddersfield Town | Middlesbrough |
| 19:45 GMT | Watmore 31'; Morsy (yellow card) 33'; Fletcher 45' (pen.); McNair (red card) 81' | | Mbenza 9'; O'Brien (yellow card) 70' | Stadium: Riverside Stadium; Attendance: 0 (Played behind closed doors); Referee: Jeremy Simpson |
Note: Live on Sky Sports

| 20 February 2021 31 | Huddersfield Town | 4–1 | Swansea City | Huddersfield |
| 15:00 GMT | Campbell 22'; O'Brien (yellow card) 45' (goal) 48'; Holmes 52', 55' | | Fulton (yellow card) 6'; Hourihane 45+1' | Stadium: John Smith's Stadium; Attendance: 0 (Played behind closed doors); Referee: John Brooks |

| 23 February 2021 32 | Derby County | 2–0 | Huddersfield Town | Derby |
| 19:00 GMT | Edmundson 22'; Byrne (yellow card) 59'; Waghorn 65' | | Rowe (yellow card) 28'; Brown (yellow card) 77' (yellow-red card) 88' | Stadium: Pride Park Stadium; Attendance: 0 (Played behind closed doors); Referee: Geoff Eltringham |

| 27 February 2021 33 | Preston North End | 3–0 | Huddersfield Town | Preston |
| 15:00 GMT | Potts 23'; Evans 67'; Gordon (yellow card) 75'; Cunningham (yellow card) 77'; Sinclair 80' | | Edmonds-Green (yellow card) 35'; Bacuna (yellow card) 57'; Pipa (yellow card) 75' | Stadium: Deepdale; Attendance: 0 (Played behind closed doors); Referee: James Linington |

| 2 March 2021 34 | Huddersfield Town | 1–1 | Birmingham City | Huddersfield |
| 19:00 GMT | Stearman (yellow card) 26'; Campbell 63'; Holmes (yellow card) 76' | | Dean (yellow card) 6'; Pedersen (yellow card) 39'; Roberts 67' | Stadium: John Smith's Stadium; Attendance: 0 (Played behind closed doors); Referee: Matthew Donohue |

| 5 March 2021 35 | Huddersfield Town | 0–0 | Cardiff City | Huddersfield |
| 19:45 GMT | Sanogo (penalty missed) 74' | | Morrison (yellow card) 62'; Vaulks (yellow card) 69' | Stadium: John Smith's Stadium; Attendance: 0 (Played behind closed doors); Referee: Tim Robinson |
Note: Live on Sky Sports

| 13 March 2021 36 | Queens Park Rangers | 0–1 | Huddersfield Town | Shepherd's Bush |
| 15:00 GMT | Johansen (yellow card) 86' | | Bacuna 55' | Stadium: Kiyan Prince Foundation Stadium; Attendance: 0 (Played behind closed doors); Referee: Michael Salisbury |

| 17 March 2021 37 | Sheffield Wednesday | 1–1 | Huddersfield Town | Sheffield |
| 19:45 GMT | Palmer (yellow card) 10'; Windass 36' | | Pipa (yellow card) 10'; Paterson 72' (o.g.) | Stadium: Hillsborough Stadium; Attendance: 0 (Played behind closed doors); Referee: Robert Jones |

| 3 April 2021 38 | Huddersfield Town | 1–1 | Brentford | Huddersfield |
| 12:30 BST | O'Brien 7' (yellow card) 90+4'; Holmes (yellow card) 56'; Hogg (yellow card) 88'; Schofield (yellow card) 90+2' | | Sørensen 50'; Mbeumo (yellow card) 66' | Stadium: John Smith's Stadium; Attendance: 0 (Played behind closed doors); Referee: Oliver Langford |
Note: Live on Sky Sports

| 6 April 2021 39 | Norwich City | 7–0 | Huddersfield Town | Norwich |
| 19:45 BST | Pukki 8', 20', 61' (pen.); Buendía 23'; Cantwell 29'; Dowell 42'; Hugill 78' | | Mbenza (yellow card) 60' | Stadium: Carrow Road; Attendance: 0 (Played behind closed doors); Referee: Jarred Gillett |
Note: Live on Sky Sports

| 10 April 2021 40 | Huddersfield Town | 0–0 | Rotherham United | Huddersfield |
| 15:00 BST | | | | Stadium: John Smith's Stadium; Attendance: 0 (Played behind closed doors); Referee: Lee Mason |

| 13 April 2021 41 | Huddersfield Town | 1–2 | AFC Bournemouth | Huddersfield |
| 17:30 BST | Hogg 76' | | Pearson (yellow card) 12'; Billing 15'; Solanke 45'; Surridge (yellow card) 90+3' | Stadium: John Smith's Stadium; Attendance: 0 (Played behind closed doors); Referee: Jeremy Simpson |

| 17 April 2021 42 | Nottingham Forest | 0–2 | Huddersfield Town | West Bridgford |
| 12:30 BST | | | Rowe 45+1'; O'Brien (yellow card) 53'; Pipa (yellow card) 57'; Bacuna 61' | Stadium: City Ground; Attendance: 0 (Played behind closed doors); Referee: Andy Woolmer |

| 21 April 2021 43 | Huddersfield Town | 0–1 | Barnsley | Huddersfield |
| 19:45 BST | Hogg (yellow card) 21' | | Andersen (yellow card) 59'; Dike 65'; Morris (yellow card) 85' | Stadium: John Smith's Stadium; Attendance: 0 (Played behind closed doors); Referee: David Webb |

| 24 April 2021 44 | Blackburn Rovers | 5–2 | Huddersfield Town | Blackburn |
| 15:00 BST | Travis (yellow card) 5'; Armstrong 8', 54', 60'; Brereton 22'; Lenihan (yellow card) 26'; Gallagher 57'; Davenport (yellow card) 89' | | Nyambe 45' (o.g.); Holmes (yellow card) 82'; Koroma 82' | Stadium: Ewood Park; Attendance: 0 (Played behind closed doors); Referee: Tim Robinson |

| 1 May 2021 45 | Huddersfield Town | 1–1 | Coventry City | Huddersfield |
| 15:00 BST | Keogh (yellow card) 15'; Sarr (yellow card) 73'; Ward 79' | | McFadzean (yellow card) 50'; Shipley 69' | Stadium: John Smith's Stadium; Attendance: 0 (Played behind closed doors); Referee: Keith Stroud |

| 8 May 2021 46 | Reading | 2–2 | Huddersfield Town | Reading |
| 12:30 BST | Semedo (yellow card) 14'; Olise 18' (pen.); Méïté 26' | | Koroma 15'; Vallejo (yellow card) 80'; Edmonds-Green 90+3' | Stadium: Madejski Stadium; Attendance: 0 (Played behind closed doors); Referee: Jarred Gillett |

=== FA Cup ===
The third round draw was made by Robbie Savage on 30 November, with Premier League and EFL Championship all entering the competition.

| 9 January 2021 Third round | Huddersfield Town | 2–3 | Plymouth Argyle | Huddersfield |
| 18:00 GMT | Crichlow 4'; Olagunju (yellow card) 5'; Rowe 32'; Duhaney (yellow card) 34' | Report | Hardie 24'; Camará 42'; Edwards 70' | Stadium: John Smith's Stadium; Attendance: 0 (Played behind closed doors); Referee: Martin Coy |

=== EFL Cup ===
The first round draw was made on 18 August, live on Sky Sports, by Paul Merson.

| 5 September 2020 First round | Huddersfield Town | 0–1 | Rochdale | Huddersfield |
| 15:00 BST | | Report | O'Connell 51' | Stadium: John Smith's Stadium; Attendance: 0 (Played behind closed doors); Referee: Ben Toner |

== Squad statistics ==
| No. | Pos. | Name | League | | FA Cup | | EFL Cup | | Total | | Discipline | |
| No. | Pos. | Name | Apps | Goals | Apps | Goals | Apps | Goals | Apps | Goals | Yellow card | Red card |
|---|---|---|---|---|---|---|---|---|---|---|---|---|
| 2 | DF | (Spain) Pipa | 35+2 | 2 | 0 | 0 | 0 | 0 | 35+2 | 2 | 8 | 0 |
| 3 | DF | (England) Harry Toffolo | 31 | 2 | 0 | 0 | 1 | 0 | 32 | 2 | 3 | 1 |
| 5 | MF | (Spain) Álex Vallejo | 12+4 | 0 | 1 | 0 | 0 | 0 | 13+4 | 0 | 1 | 0 |
| 6 | MF | (England) Jonathan Hogg | 37 | 1 | 0 | 0 | 1 | 0 | 38 | 1 | 9 | 0 |
| 7 | MF | (Curaçao) Juninho Bacuna | 37+6 | 5 | 0 | 0 | 1 | 0 | 38+6 | 5 | 5 | 0 |
| 8 | MF | (England) Lewis O'Brien | 39+3 | 3 | 0 | 0 | 0 | 0 | 39+3 | 3 | 5 | 0 |
| 9 | MF | (United States) Duane Holmes | 16+3 | 2 | 0 | 0 | 0 | 0 | 16+3 | 2 | 4 | 0 |
| 10 | MF | (England) Alex Pritchard | 6+12 | 0 | 0 | 0 | 1 | 0 | 7+12 | 0 | 0 | 0 |
| 12 | DF | (England) Richard Stearman | 14+7 | 0 | 0 | 0 | 0 | 0 | 14+7 | 0 | 5 | 0 |
| 14 | MF | (Netherlands) Carel Eiting | 17+6 | 3 | 0 | 0 | 0 | 0 | 17+6 | 3 | 0 | 0 |
| 15 | DF | (Republic of Ireland) Richard Keogh | 21 | 0 | 0 | 0 | 0 | 0 | 21 | 0 | 1 | 0 |
| 16 | MF | (Jamaica) Rolando Aarons | 5+5 | 0 | 0+1 | 0 | 0 | 0 | 5+6 | 0 | 0 | 0 |
| 17 | DF | (England) Demeaco Duhaney | 7+6 | 0 | 1 | 0 | 0 | 0 | 8+6 | 0 | 1 | 0 |
| 18 | FW | (Belgium) Isaac Mbenza | 28+8 | 5 | 0 | 0 | 0+1 | 0 | 28+9 | 5 | 5 | 0 |
| 19 | FW | (England) Josh Koroma | 19+1 | 8 | 0 | 0 | 1 | 0 | 20+1 | 8 | 2 | 0 |
| 20 | FW | (England) Sorba Thomas | 0+7 | 0 | 0 | 0 | 0 | 0 | 0+7 | 0 | 0 | 0 |
| 22 | FW | (England) Fraizer Campbell | 35+5 | 7 | 0 | 0 | 0 | 0 | 35+5 | 7 | 4 | 0 |
| 23 | DF | (Senegal) Naby Sarr | 41 | 4 | 0 | 0 | 0 | 0 | 41 | 4 | 4 | 1 |
| 25 | FW | (England) Danny Ward | 6+13 | 1 | 0 | 0 | 1 | 0 | 7+13 | 1 | 0 | 0 |
| 26 | DF | (Germany) Christopher Schindler | 10+2 | 0 | 0 | 0 | 1 | 0 | 11+2 | 0 | 1 | 0 |
| 27 | DF | (England) Romoney Crichlow | 2+2 | 0 | 1 | 1 | 1 | 0 | 4+2 | 1 | 1 | 0 |
| 28 | DF | (England) Jaden Brown | 1+12 | 0 | 1 | 0 | 0 | 0 | 2+12 | 0 | 1 | 1 |
| 29 | DF | (England) Aaron Rowe | 10+10 | 1 | 1 | 1 | 1 | 0 | 12+10 | 2 | 1 | 0 |
| 30 | DF | (England) Ben Jackson | 1 | 0 | 0+1 | 0 | 1 | 0 | 2+1 | 0 | 0 | 0 |
| 31 | GK | (England) Ryan Schofield | 29+1 | 0 | 0 | 0 | 0 | 0 | 29+1 | 0 | 2 | 0 |
| 33 | MF | (England) Josh Austerfield | 0 | 0 | 1 | 0 | 0+1 | 0 | 1+1 | 0 | 0 | 0 |
| 34 | MF | (England) Matty Daly | 1+4 | 0 | 1 | 0 | 0 | 0 | 2+4 | 0 | 0 | 0 |
| 35 | DF | (England) Rarmani Edmonds-Green | 16+8 | 2 | 0 | 0 | 0 | 0 | 16+8 | 2 | 1 | 0 |
| 36 | FW | (England) Kieran Phillips | 0+10 | 0 | 1 | 0 | 0 | 0 | 1+10 | 0 | 0 | 0 |
| 37 | DF | (England) Mustapha Olagunju | 0 | 0 | 1 | 0 | 0 | 0 | 1 | 0 | 1 | 0 |
| 40 | MF | (France) Brahima Diarra | 0+1 | 0 | 0+1 | 0 | 0 | 0 | 0+2 | 0 | 0 | 0 |
| 41 | MF | (Wales) Pat Jones | 0+2 | 0 | 1 | 0 | 0 | 0 | 1+2 | 0 | 0 | 0 |
| 44 | GK | (Portugal) Joel Pereira | 2 | 0 | 0 | 0 | 0 | 0 | 2 | 0 | 0 | 0 |
| 48 | MF | (France) Etienne Camara | 0 | 0 | 0+1 | 0 | 0 | 0 | 0+1 | 0 | 0 | 0 |
| 49 | MF | (England) Scott High | 1+13 | 0 | 0 | 0 | 0 | 0 | 1+13 | 0 | 0 | 0 |
| 50 | MF | (England) Myles Bright | 0 | 0 | 0+1 | 0 | 0 | 0 | 0+1 | 0 | 0 | 0 |
| 55 | FW | (France) Yaya Sanogo | 5+4 | 0 | 0 | 0 | 0 | 0 | 5+4 | 0 | 0 | 0 |
| — | — | Own goals | – | 4 | – | 0 | – | 0 | – | 4 | – | – |
Players who left the club during the season:
| 1 | GK | (England) Ben Hamer | 15 | 0 | 1 | 0 | 1 | 0 | 17 | 0 | 2 | 0 |
| 11 | FW | (France) Adama Diakhaby | 7+9 | 0 | 0 | 0 | 0+1 | 0 | 7+10 | 0 | 1 | 0 |

== Awards ==
=== Huddersfield Town Blue & White Foundation Player of the Month Award ===
Awarded monthly to the player that was chosen by members of the Blue & White Foundation voting on htafc.com

| Month | Player | Votes |
|---|---|---|
| September/October | (England) Harry Toffolo | |
| November | (Netherlands) Carel Eiting | |
| December | (England) Ryan Schofield | |
| January | (England) Harry Toffolo | |
| February | (England) Lewis O'Brien | |
| March | (Senegal) Naby Sarr | |
| Season | (England) Jonathan Hogg | |
