= Álex Vallejo =

Spanish footballer (born 1992)

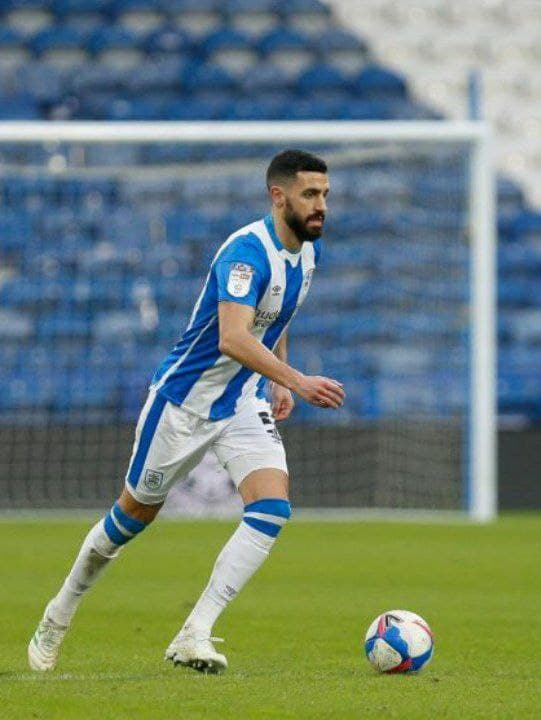

Personal information
- Full name: Alexander Vallejo Mínguez
- Date of birth: 16 January 1992 (age 34)
- Place of birth: Vitoria-Gasteiz, Spain
- Height: 1.91 m (6 ft 3 in)
- Position: Midfielder

Team information
- Current team: Goa

Youth career
- 2003–2011: Alavés

Senior career*
Years	Team	Apps	(Gls)
2011–2012	Alavés B	18	(0)
2011–2012	Alavés	1	(0)
2012	→ Sestao (loan)	7	(0)
2012–2015	Mallorca B	75	(2)
2013–2017	Mallorca	23	(1)
2017–2019	Córdoba	46	(0)
2019–2020	Fuenlabrada	10	(0)
2020–2022	Huddersfield Town	21	(1)
2022–2023	Doxa Katokopias	18	(0)
2023	Stal Mielec	14	(0)
2023–2026	Diósgyőr	83	(4)
2026–	Goa	2	(1)
- * Club domestic league appearances and goals as of 28 October 2026

Alexander 'Álex' Vallejo Mínguez (born 16 January 1992) is a Spanish professional footballer who plays as a midfielder for Indian Super League club Goa. He has previously played for Spanish clubs Alavés, Sestao, Mallorca, Córdoba and Fuenlabrada, before moving to England in 2020, Cyprus in 2022, Poland in 2023 and Hungary from 2023 to 2026.

== Football career ==
Born in Vitoria-Gasteiz, Álava, Vallejo finished his graduation with Deportivo Alavés' youth setup, and made his senior debut with the club's reserves in the 2011–12 season, in the Tercera División. On 20 August 2011, he made his first-team debut, but was substituted after 24 minutes after conceding a penalty in a 2–2 away draw against CA Osasuna B, in the Segunda División B championship.

On 25 January 2012, Vallejo signed a new deal with Alavés and was immediately loaned to Sestao River Club, also in the third division. On 2 August, he joined fellow third-division side RCD Mallorca B and was a regular starter in the 2012–13 season, in which the club were relegated.

On 23 November 2013, Vallejo played his first professional game with the club's first team, starting in a 2–1 home win over former club Alavés, in the Segunda División. On 26 June of the following year, he renewed his association with the Balearic outfit for three years, being definitively promoted to the first-team.

On 20 December 2014, Vallejo scored his first professional goal in a 3–1 away loss to SD Ponferradina; this match proved to be his last one with the main squad before suffering a severe knee injury in April 2015, sidelining him for nearly two years.

On 2 July 2017, after suffering relegation from the Segunda División, free agent Vallejo signed a two-year contract with fellow second-tier team Córdoba CF. On 5 August 2019, after another relegation, he signed a one-year deal with second division newcomers CF Fuenlabrada.

On 31 January 2020, after appearing sparingly, Vallejo cut ties with Fuenla.

On 18 October 2020, Vallejo joined EFL Championship side Huddersfield Town as a free agent on a contract running until the end of the 2020–21 season with Huddersfield having the option of a further year’s extension. After a period of adapting to manager Carlos Corberán’s physical demands, he made 16 appearances for the club in the 2020–21 campaign. Huddersfield activated the one year option for the 2021–22 season. He scored his first goal for Huddersfield against Blackburn Rovers on 28 September 2021. Huddersfield announced on 1 June 2022 that he had been released.

After a short stint with Cypriot side Doxa Katokopias, on 26 January 2023 Vallejo signed a six-month deal with Polish Ekstraklasa side Stal Mielec, with a two-year extension option.

== Career statistics ==
As of match played 27 May 2023

Appearances and goals by club, season and competition
Club	Season	League			National cup (Note: Includes Copa del Rey, FA Cup, Cypriot Cup)		League cup (Note: Includes EFL Cup)		Other		Total	
Club	Season	Division	Apps	Goals	Apps	Goals	Apps	Goals	Apps	Goals	Apps	Goals
Alavés	2011–12	Segunda División B	1	0	0	0	—		—		1	0
Sestao (loan)	2011–12	Segunda División B	7	0	0	0	—		—		7	0
Mallorca B	2012–13	Segunda División B	36	1	—		—		—		36	1
Mallorca B	2013–14	Tercera División	30	1	—		—		—		30	1
Mallorca B	2014–15	Segunda División B	9	0	—		—		—		9	0
Mallorca B	Total		75	2	—		—		—		75	2
Mallorca	2013–14	Segunda División	6	0	0	0	—		—		6	0
Mallorca	2014–15	Segunda División	4	1	1	0	—		—		5	1
Mallorca	2015–16	Segunda División	0	0	0	0	—		—		0	0
Mallorca	2016–17	Segunda División	13	0	0	0	—		—		13	0
Mallorca	Total		23	1	1	0	—		—		24	1
Córdoba	2017–18	Segunda División	18	0	2	0	—		—		20	0
Córdoba	2018–19	Segunda División	28	0	1	0	—		—		29	0
Córdoba	Total		46	0	3	0	—		—		49	0
Fuenlabrada	2019–20	Segunda División	10	0	1	0	—		—		11	0
Huddersfield Town	2020–21	Championship	16	0	1	0	0	0	—		17	0
Huddersfield Town	2021–22	Championship	5	1	0	0	1	0	—		6	1
Huddersfield Town	Total		21	1	1	0	1	0	—		23	1
Doxa Katokopias	2022–23	Cypriot First Division	18	0	1	0	—		—		19	0
Stal Mielec	2022–23	Ekstraklasa	14	0	—		—		—		14	0
Career total			215	4	7	0	1	0	0	0	223	4
