= Carel Eiting =

Dutch footballer (born 1998)

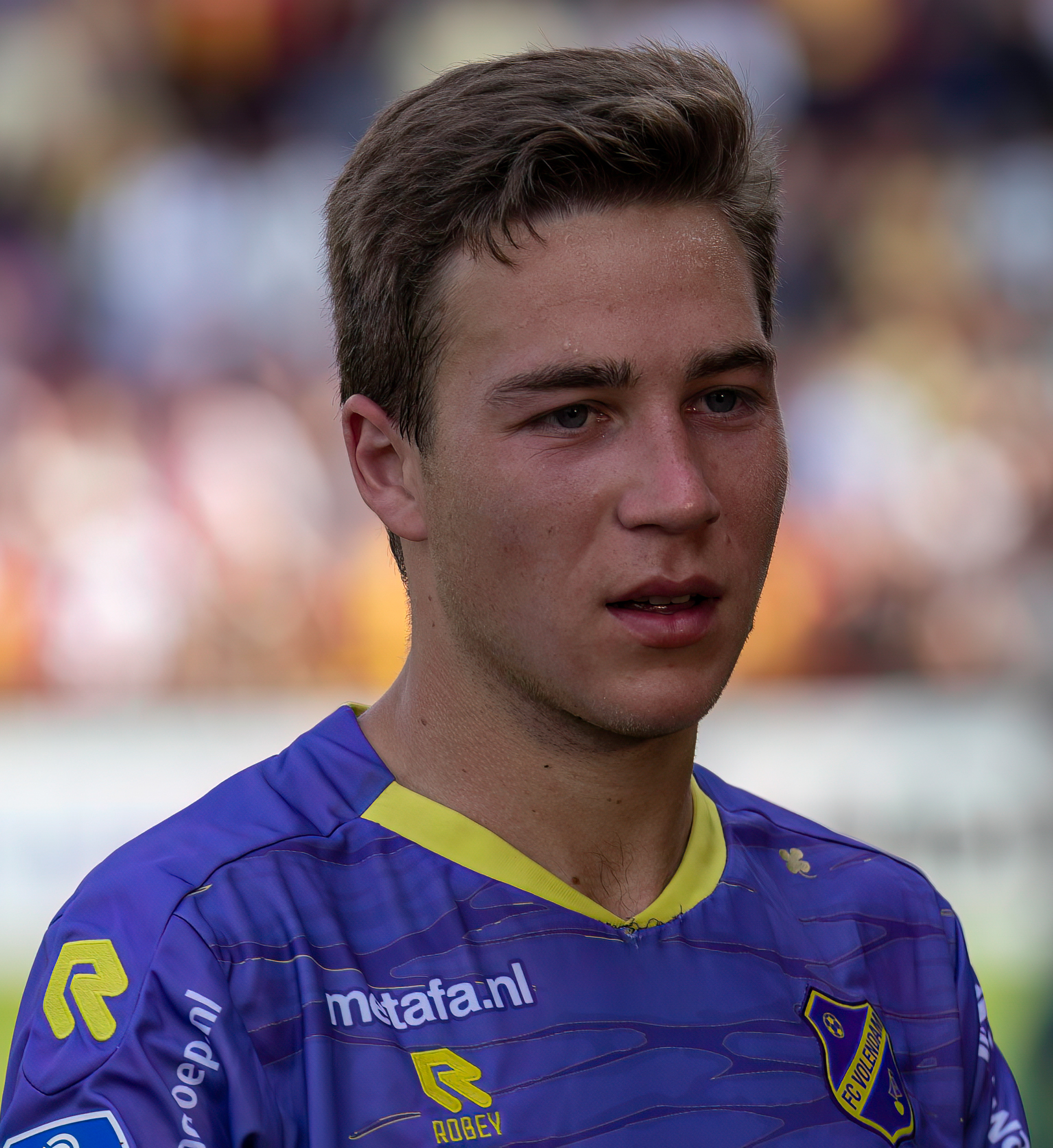
- Eiting with Volendam in 2023

Personal information
- Full name: Carel Willem Hendrik Eiting
- Date of birth: 11 February 1998 (age 28)
- Place of birth: Amsterdam, Netherlands
- Height: 1.79 m (5 ft 10 in)
- Position: Midfielder

Team information
- Current team: Omonia
- Number: 6

Youth career
- –2007: AFC
- 2007–2016: Ajax

Senior career*
| Years | Team | Apps | (Gls) |
| 2016–2020 | Jong Ajax | 61 | (8) |
| 2017–2021 | Ajax | 17 | (0) |
| 2020–2021 | → Huddersfield Town (loan) | 23 | (3) |
| 2021–2022 | Genk | 12 | (0) |
| 2022 | Huddersfield Town | 5 | (0) |
| 2022–2023 | Volendam | 34 | (3) |
| 2023–2025 | Twente | 39 | (2) |
| 2025 | → Sparta Rotterdam (loan) | 12 | (1) |
| 2025– | Omonia | 25 | (1) |

International career
| 2013–2014 | Netherlands U15 | 2 | (0) |
| 2014 | Netherlands U16 | 7 | (0) |
| 2014–2015 | Netherlands U17 | 14 | (2) |
| 2015 | Netherlands U18 | 2 | (0) |
| 2015–2017 | Netherlands U19 | 5 | (1) |
| 2017 | Netherlands U20 | 2 | (0) |
| 2018 | Netherlands U21 | 3 | (0) |
- * Club domestic league appearances and goals as of 14 June 2026

Carel Willem Hendrik Eiting (born 11 February 1998) is a Dutch professional footballer who plays as a midfielder for Cypriot club Omonia.

== Club career ==
=== Ajax ===
Eiting is a youth exponent from Ajax. He made his professional debut with Jong Ajax on 12 August 2016 in an Eerste Divisie game against Almere City playing the full match. On 19 September 2020, Eiting joined EFL Championship side Huddersfield Town on loan for the 2020–21 season.

He made his Huddersfield debut in an EFL Championship fixture against Nottingham Forest on 25 September 2020, coming on as a half-time substitute for Jonathan Hogg. He scored his first goal for the club in a 1–1 draw with Luton Town on 7 November 2020.

=== Genk ===
On 25 June 2021, it was announced that Genk had signed Eiting to a four-year contract transferring from Ajax for an undisclosed amount, joining the team of John van den Brom. His contract with the club was cancelled on 30 January 2022.

=== Huddersfield Town ===
On 31 January 2022, Eiting returned to Huddersfield Town on a deal to the end of the 2021–22 season, following the cancellation of his contract at Genk. Huddersfield announced on 1 June 2022 that he had been released.

=== Volendam ===
On 4 August 2022, Eiting signed a two-year contract with Volendam.

=== Twente ===
On 1 September 2023, Eiting signed a three-year contract with Twente. On 17 January 2025, he was loaned to Sparta Rotterdam until the end of the season.

=== Cyprus ===
In summer 2025, Eiting moved abroad again to play for Cypriot powerhouse Omonia.

== International career ==
Eiting played 3 games for the Netherlands national under-21 football team and 14 for the U17s.

== Career statistics ==
As of match played 27 April 2025

Appearances and goals by club, season and competition
| Club | Season | League | | | National cup (Note: Includes KNVB Cup, Belgian Cup, FA Cup) | | Europe | | Other | | Total | |
| Club | Season | Division | Apps | Goals | Apps | Goals | Apps | Goals | Apps | Goals | Apps | Goals |
|---|---|---|---|---|---|---|---|---|---|---|---|---|
| Jong Ajax | 2016–17 | Eerste Divisie | 28 | 3 | — | | — | | — | | 28 | 3 |
| Jong Ajax | 2017–18 | Eerste Divisie | 18 | 4 | — | | — | | — | | 18 | 4 |
| Jong Ajax | 2018–19 | Eerste Divisie | 3 | 0 | — | | — | | — | | 3 | 0 |
| Jong Ajax | 2019–20 | Eerste Divisie | 12 | 1 | — | | — | | — | | 12 | 1 |
| Jong Ajax | Total | | 61 | 8 | — | | — | | — | | 61 | 8 |
| Ajax | 2016–17 | Eredivisie | 0 | 0 | 1 | 0 | 0 | 0 | 0 | 0 | 1 | 0 |
| Ajax | 2017–18 | Eredivisie | 4 | 0 | 2 | 0 | 0 | 0 | 0 | 0 | 6 | 0 |
| Ajax | 2018–19 | Eredivisie | 7 | 0 | 2 | 0 | 5 (Note: Appearances in UEFA Champions League) | 0 | 0 | 0 | 14 | 0 |
| Ajax | 2019–20 | Eredivisie | 6 | 0 | 3 | 0 | 1 (Note: Appearance in UEFA Europa League) | 1 | 0 | 0 | 10 | 1 |
| Ajax | 2020–21 | Eredivisie | 0 | 0 | 0 | 0 | 0 | 0 | 0 | 0 | 0 | 0 |
| Ajax | Total | | 17 | 0 | 8 | 0 | 6 | 1 | 0 | 0 | 31 | 1 |
| Huddersfield Town (loan) | 2020–21 | Championship | 23 | 3 | 0 | 0 | — | | — | | 23 | 3 |
| Genk | 2021–22 | Belgian Pro League | 12 | 0 | 1 | 0 | 5 (Note: Two appearances in UEFA Champions League, three appearances in UEFA Europa League) | 0 | 1 (Note: Appearance in Belgian Super Cup) | 0 | 19 | 0 |
| Huddersfield Town | 2021–22 | Championship | 5 | 0 | 2 | 0 | — | | 0 | 0 | 7 | 0 |
| Volendam | 2022–23 | Eredivisie | 34 | 3 | 1 | 0 | — | | 0 | 0 | 35 | 3 |
| Twente | 2023–24 | Eredivisie | 23 | 0 | 1 | 0 | — | | — | | 24 | 0 |
| Twente | 2024–25 | Eredivisie | 16 | 2 | 2 | 0 | 3 (Note: Two appearances in UEFA Champions League, one appearance in UEFA Europa League) | 0 | — | | 21 | 0 |
| Twente | Total | | 39 | 2 | 3 | 0 | 3 | 0 | — | | 45 | 2 |
| Sparta Rotterdam (loan) | 2024–25 | Eredivisie | 12 | 1 | — | | — | | — | | 12 | 1 |
| Career total | | | 193 | 17 | 16 | 0 | 14 | 1 | 1 | 0 | 233 | 16 |

== Honours ==
Ajax

- Eredivisie: 2018–19
- KNVB Cup: 2018–19

Omonia

- Cypriot First Division: 2025–26
