= Rolando Aarons =

Jamaican footballer (born 1995)

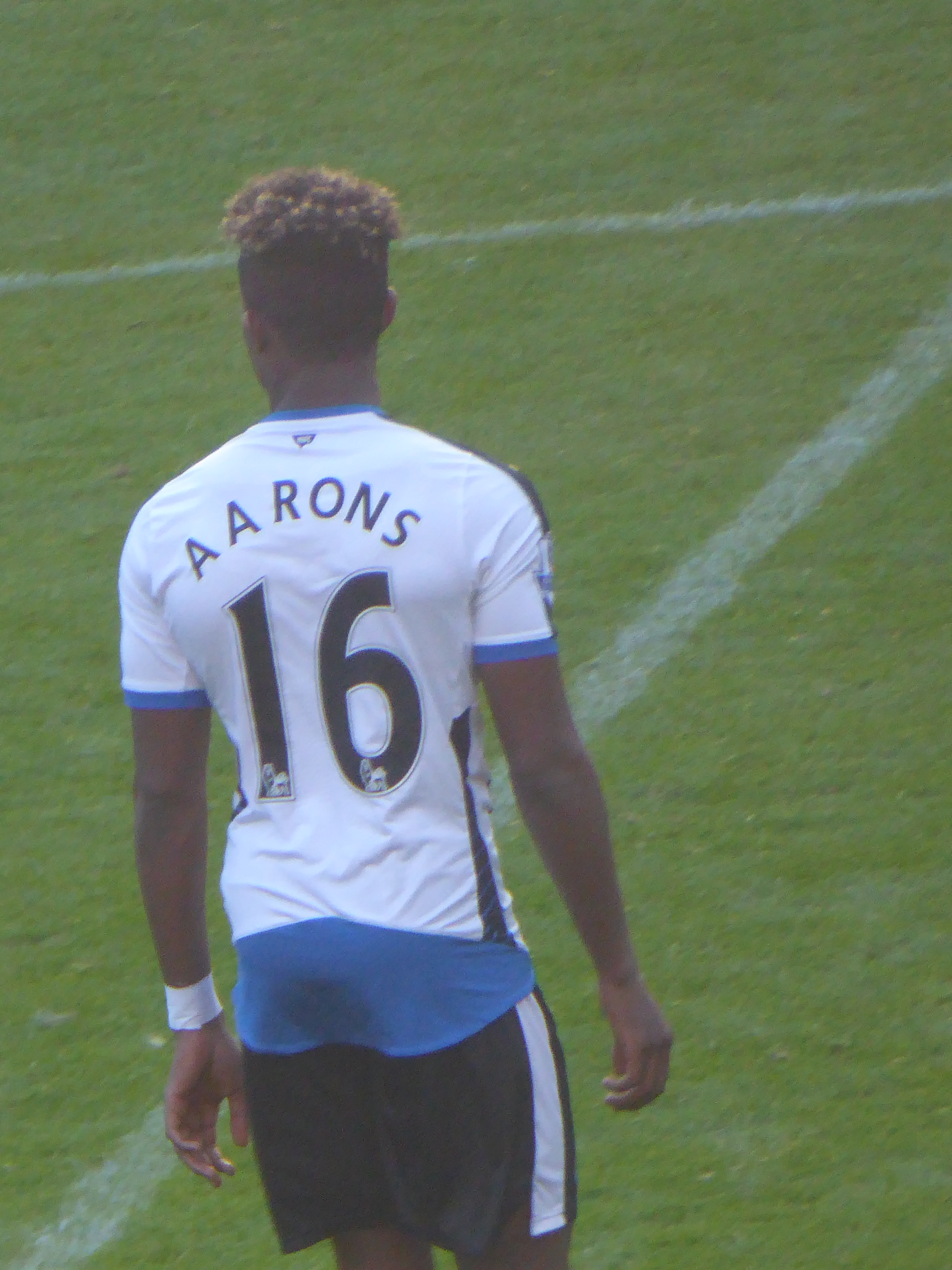
- Aarons playing for Newcastle United in 2015

Personal information
- Full name: Rolando Aarons
- Date of birth: 16 November 1995 (age 30)
- Place of birth: Kingston, Jamaica
- Height: 1.80 m (5 ft 11 in)
- Position: Winger

Youth career
- 2009–2012: Bristol City
- 2012–2014: Newcastle United

Senior career*
Years	Team	Apps	(Gls)
2014–2021	Newcastle United	22	(2)
2018	→ Hellas Verona (loan)	11	(0)
2018	→ Slovan Liberec (loan)	12	(0)
2019	→ Sheffield Wednesday (loan)	9	(1)
2019–2020	→ Wycombe Wanderers (loan)	10	(1)
2020	→ Motherwell (loan)	6	(0)
2021–2023	Huddersfield Town	11	(0)
2022	→ Motherwell (loan)	2	(0)
2024	Celje	16	(0)
2025–2026	Morecambe	11	(0)

International career
2014–2015	England U20	5	(2)
2022	Jamaica	2	(0)
- * Club domestic league appearances and goals as of 15:07, 22 December 2025 (UTC)

Rolando Aarons (born 16 November 1995) is a professional footballer who plays as a winger. Born in Jamaica, he has previously represented England at youth international level.

He has had previous spells with Hellas Verona in Italy, Slovan Liberec in the Czech Republic, Scottish club Motherwell, Slovenian side Celje, and in England with Newcastle United, Huddersfield Town, Sheffield Wednesday, Wycombe Wanderers and Morecambe

== Club career ==
=== Newcastle United ===
Aarons joined Newcastle United in 2012 after being released by his home town club Bristol City. He made his reserve team debut on 8 February 2013 against Stoke City and scored in his second reserve game against Crystal Palace 17 days later.

Aarons travelled with the Newcastle squad to their game against Fulham. He was not included in the matchday squad as the Magpies lost 1–0. Reserves teammate Ľubomír Šatka also travelled with the squad for the first time.

On 1 April 2014, Aarons signed a professional contract with Newcastle United.

==== 2014–15 season ====
Aarons had an impressive pre-season prior to the 2014–15 season, scoring one goal and creating one assist in the 2014 Schalke 04 Cup against Bundesliga team Schalke. Shortly after, he was allocated the number 16 shirt. On 17 August 2014, he made his Premier League debut in their first match of the campaign, replacing Yoan Gouffran for the final 16 minutes of a 2–0 home defeat to Manchester City. He scored his first senior goal in the 3–3 draw with Crystal Palace on 30 August. He also set up teammate Mike Williamson for Newcastle's third goal in the same match, striking the post with his own effort. His contribution to the match was described by The Guardian as "thrillingly incisive". Aarons came back from England U20 duty with a hamstring injury; scans in mid-September determined that it would take around six weeks for the injury to heal. On 29 October, Aarons returned from injury to score his second goal for the club in the fourth round of the League Cup, opening the scoring in Newcastle's 2–0 away victory over holders Manchester City. In early November, Aarons suffered a recurrence of his hamstring injury, ruling him out for another month.

==== Loans ====
In 2018, Aarons spent time out on loan with Hellas Verona under Fabio Pecchia, Benítez's former assistant at Newcastle, and Slovan Liberec. After 13 appearances in all competitions for the Czech side, he returned to Newcastle in December 2018. On 31 January 2019, deadline day for the winter transfer window, he signed for Sheffield Wednesday on loan until the end of the season.

Aarons signed for Wycombe Wanderers on 2 September 2019 on a short-term loan. The loan spell came to an end on 12 January 2020.

On 31 January 2020, Aarons moved on loan to Scottish Premiership club Motherwell for the remainder of the season. But on 31 May 2020 Aarons's loan spell ended with the Scottish outfit.

=== Huddersfield Town ===
On 7 January 2021, Aarons signed for Huddersfield Town on a two-and-a-half-year deal for an undisclosed fee. He made his debut for the club two days later in a 3–2 FA Cup Third Round loss to Plymouth Argyle, coming off the substitutes' bench to replace Pat Jones. A week later, he made his Championship debut for Huddersfield, playing 62 minutes in a 2–1 defeat to Watford, before being replaced by Jones.

==== Motherwell (loan) ====
On 30 August 2022, Aarons returned to Motherwell on loan having spent time with the club in 2020. On 2 November 2022, his loan was cancelled due to injury.

=== Celje ===
On 8 January 2024, Aarons signed for NK Celje as a free agent. He made his debut against Dinamo Zagreb on 13 January 2024, which Celje lost 2–0 to Dinamo Zagreb.

=== Free agent ===
In June 2025, Aarons featured as a trialist for Dinamo Tbilisi in a 1–1 draw against Pyunik.

=== Morecambe ===
On 22 September 2025, Aarons joined National League club Morecambe.

== International career ==
Aarons is eligible to represent either England or Jamaica at international level. In August 2014, he received his first call-up to the England U20 team, marking his debut with the opening goal in a 6–0 friendly match win over Romania on 5 September. His club manager Alan Pardew confirmed that, despite interest from Jamaica, he intended to pursue an international future within the England set-up.

In May 2022, he received his first call-up to the Jamaica squad for their CONCACAF Nations League fixtures against Suriname and Mexico. He would make his debut as a substitute against Suriname on 7 June 2022 at Kingston National Stadium.

== Style of play ==
Aarons operates on the outside of midfield or as a winger, usually on the left side. He is left-footed and known for his injections of pace and technical ability. He has been compared to Chelsea winger Raheem Sterling in his playing style and in his descent; both are Jamaican-born English players.

== Personal life ==
Aarons was born in Kingston, Jamaica, and migrated to England at the age of five to join his mother, who was living in Bristol. He is the cousin of former Norwich City and current Bournemouth player Max Aarons.

In April 2018, Aarons arrived to the Newcastle Crown Court due to violent disorder; he pleaded guilty and was given a 10-month suspended sentence and ordered to do 100 hours of community service.

== Career statistics ==
=== Club ===
As of 21 December 2025

Club statistics
Club	Season	League			National cup (Note: Includes FA Cup, Czech Cup, Scottish Cup)		League cup (Note: Includes EFL Cup, Scottish League Cup)		Other		Total	
Club	Season	Division	Apps	Goals	Apps	Goals	Apps	Goals	Apps	Goals	Apps	Goals
Newcastle United	2014–15	Premier League	4	1	0	0	2	1	—		6	2
Newcastle United	2015–16	Premier League	10	1	0	0	1	0	—		11	1
Newcastle United	2016–17	Championship	4	0	0	0	1	0	—		5	0
Newcastle United	2017–18	Premier League	4	0	0	0	1	1	—		5	1
Newcastle United	2018–19	Premier League	0	0	0	0	0	0	—		0	0
Newcastle United	2019–20	Premier League	0	0	0	0	0	0	—		0	0
Newcastle United	2020–21	Premier League	0	0	0	0	0	0	—		0	0
Newcastle United	Total		22	2	0	0	5	2	0	0	27	4
Hellas Verona (loan)	2017–18	Serie A	11	0	0	0	—		—		11	0
Slovan Liberec (loan)	2018–19	Czech First League	12	0	1	0	—		—		13	0
Sheffield Wednesday (loan)	2018–19	Championship	9	1	0	0	0	0	—		9	1
Wycombe Wanderers (loan)	2019–20	League One	10	1	1	0	0	0	2 (Note: Appearances in EFL Trophy)	1	13	2
Motherwell (loan)	2019–20	Scottish Premiership	6	0	2	1	0	0	—		8	1
Huddersfield Town	2020–21	Championship	10	0	1	0	0	0	—		11	0
Huddersfield Town	2021–22	Championship	1	0	0	0	0	0	—		1	0
Huddersfield Town	2022–23	Championship	0	0	0	0	0	0	—		0	0
Huddersfield Town	Total		11	0	1	0	0	0	—		12	0
Motherwell (loan)	2022–23	Scottish Premiership	2	0	0	0	1	0	—		3	0
NK Celje	2023–24	Slovenian PrvaLiga	11	0	0	0	—		—		11	0
NK Celje	2024–25	Slovenian PrvaLiga	5	0	0	0	—		6 (Note: Three appearances and one goal in UEFA Champions League, two appearances in UEFA Europa League, appearance in UEFA Conference League)	1	11	1
NK Celje	Total		16	0	0	0	—		6	1	22	1
Morecambe	2025–26	National League	11	0	0	0	0	0	0	0	11	0
Career total			110	4	4	1	6	2	8	2	128	9

=== International ===
As of 15 June 2022

National Team	Year	Apps	Goals
Jamaica	2022	2	0
Total		2	0

== Honours ==
Celje

- Slovenian PrvaLiga: 2023–24
