= Pipa (footballer) =

Spanish footballer

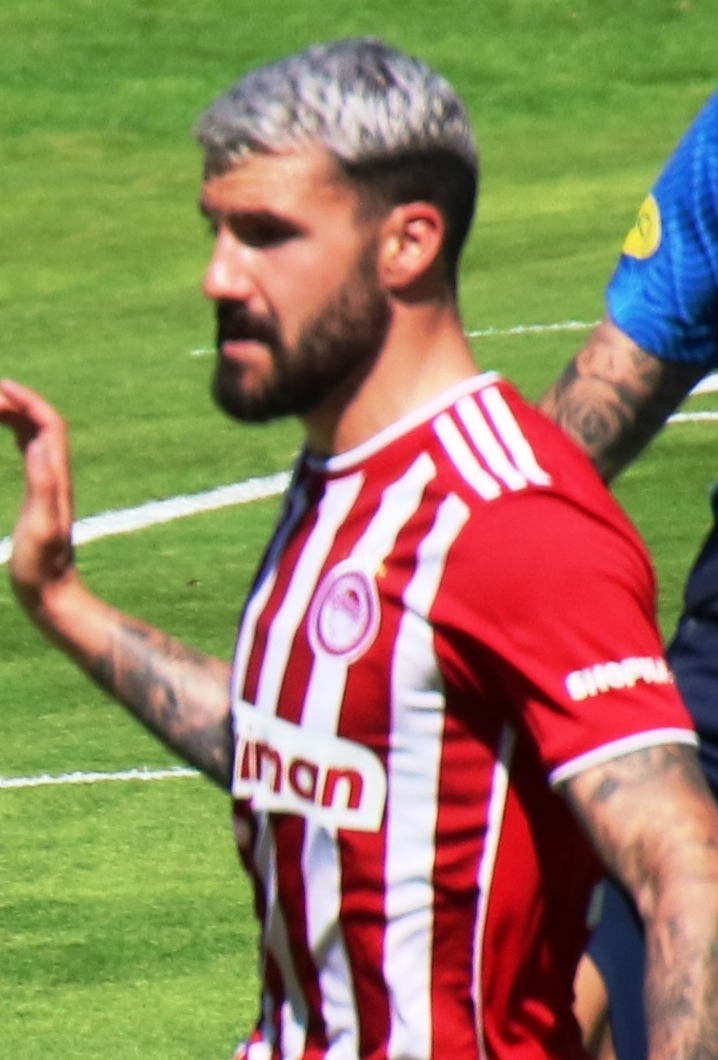
- Pipa in 2022

Personal information
- Full name: Gonzalo Ávila Gordón
- Date of birth: 26 January 1998 (age 28)
- Place of birth: Esparreguera, Spain
- Height: 1.75 m (5 ft 9 in)
- Position: Right-back

Team information
- Current team: Sabadell

Youth career
- Esparreguera
- 2008–2017: Espanyol
- 2009–2010: → Damm (loan)

Senior career*
Years	Team	Apps	(Gls)
2016–2018	Espanyol B	59	(4)
2018–2020	Espanyol	7	(0)
2019	→ Gimnàstic (loan)	18	(0)
2020–2022	Huddersfield Town	48	(2)
2022–2023	Olympiacos	11	(0)
2023–2026	Ludogorets Razgrad	14	(0)
2023–2026	Ludogorets II	20	(1)
2023–2024	→ West Bromwich Albion (loan)	13	(0)
2024–2025	→ Burgos (loan)	26	(0)
2026–	Sabadell	5	(0)

International career
2016–2017	Spain U19	5	(0)
2016–2017	Spain U20	4	(0)
2019–2021	Spain U21	6	(0)
- * Club domestic league appearances and goals as of 29 October 2026 (UTC)

Gonzalo Ávila Gordón (born 26 January 1998), known as Pipa, is a Spanish professional footballer who plays as a right-back for Segunda División club CE Sabadell FC.

== Career ==
=== Espanyol ===
Born in Esparraguera, Barcelona, Catalonia, Pipa finished his formation with RCD Espanyol, after previous stints at CF Damm and FS Esparraguera. He made his senior debut with the reserves on 20 February 2016, starting in a 0–1 Segunda División B away loss against Valencia CF Mestalla.

Pipa was a regular starter for the B-side during the 2016–17 season, which ended in relegation. On 22 May 2017 he renewed his contract until 2022, and scored his first senior goal on 27 August by netting the last in a 3–0 home win against FC Ascó in the Tercera División.

On 28 May 2018, Pipa was definitely promoted to the main squad in La Liga ahead of the 2018–19 campaign. The following 2 January, after failing to appear in a single match for the Pericos, he was loaned to Segunda División strugglers Gimnàstic de Tarragona until June.

Pipa made his professional debut on 6 January 2019, starting as a right winger in a 1–0 home win against Córdoba CF. He was a regular starter for the club during his six-month spell, suffering team relegation.

Upon returning to Espanyol, Pipa was handed the number 2 jersey, and made his first-team debut on 15 August 2019, starting in a 3–0 home defeat of FC Luzern in the UEFA Europa League. He made his top-tier debut on 26 September, replacing Wu Lei in a 1–1 away draw against RC Celta de Vigo.

=== Huddersfield Town ===
On 7 September 2020, Pipa signed a three-year contract with EFL Championship side Huddersfield Town, for an undisclosed fee. He scored his first goal for Huddersfield in a 3–0 win over Millwall on 31 October.

=== Ludogorets ===
On 1 February 2023, he was announced as a new signing of Bulgarian club PFC Ludogorets Razgrad. On 1 September, he returned to England after agreeing to a loan deal with West Bromwich Albion.

On 30 August 2024, Pipa returned to Spain and its second division, after joining Burgos CF on a one-year loan deal.

=== Sabadell ===
On 24 July 2026, free agent Pipa agreed to a one-year contract with CE Sabadell FC in the Spanish second level.

== Career statistics ==
As of match played 25 August 2022

Appearances and goals by club, season and competition
Club	Season	League			National Cup		League Cup		Other		Total	
Club	Season	Division	Apps	Goals	Apps	Goals	Apps	Goals	Apps	Goals	Apps	Goals
Espanyol B	2015–16	Segunda División B	1	0	—		—		—		1	0
Espanyol B	2016–17	Segunda División B	31	0	—		—		—		31	0
Espanyol B	2017–18	Tercera División	27	4	—		—		—		27	4
Espanyol B	Total		59	4	—		—		—		59	4
Espanyol	2018–19	La Liga	0	0	0	0	—		—		0	0
Espanyol	2019–20	La Liga	7	0	2	0	—		4 (Note: Appearances in UEFA Europa League)	0	13	0
Espanyol	Total		7	0	2	0	—		4	0	13	0
Gimnàstic (loan)	2018–19	Segunda División	18	0	0	0	—		—		18	0
Huddersfield Town	2020–21	Championship	37	2	0	0	0	0	—		37	2
Huddersfield Town	2021–22	Championship	11	0	3	0	0	0	—		14	0
Huddersfield Town	Total		48	2	3	0	0	0	—		51	2
Olympiacos	2022–23	Super League Greece	11	0	0	0	—		9	0	20	0
Career total			143	6	5	0	0	0	13	0	161	6
