= Scott High =

Footballer (born 2001)

Personal information
- Full name: Scott John High
- Date of birth: 15 February 2001 (age 25)
- Place of birth: Dewsbury, England
- Height: 1.77 m (5 ft 10 in)
- Position: Midfielder

Team information
- Current team: Solihull Moors
- Number: 15

Youth career
- Huddersfield Town

Senior career*
Years	Team	Apps	(Gls)
2019–2025	Huddersfield Town	47	(0)
2019	→ Concord Rangers (loan)	3	(0)
2020	→ Concord Rangers (loan)	1	(0)
2020	→ Shrewsbury Town (loan)	12	(0)
2022–2023	→ Rotherham United (loan)	13	(0)
2023–2024	→ Ross County (loan)	2	(0)
2024	→ Dundalk (loan)	14	(1)
2024	→ FC Halifax Town (loan)	10	(1)
2024–2025	→ FC Halifax Town (loan)	11	(1)
2025	Barnet	3	(0)
2025	→ Solihull Moors (loan)	8	(0)
2025–	Solihull Moors	16	(4)

International career^{‡}
2021–2022	Scotland U21	7	(0)
- * Club domestic league appearances and goals as of 18:08, 22 March 2026 (UTC) ‡ National team caps and goals as of 08:02, 16 August 2022 (UTC)

Scott John High (born 15 February 2001) is a professional footballer who plays as a midfielder for Solihull Moors. Born in England, High has represented Scotland at under-21 level.

== Club career ==
Born in Dewsbury, High began his career with Huddersfield Town. He moved on loan to Concord Rangers in November 2019 until January 2020, but was recalled by Huddersfield a month later. He returned to Concord Rangers in February 2020 for a second loan spell.

High made his senior debut for Huddersfield on 22 July 2020, the last day of the 2019–20 season. On 3 August 2020, he joined League One side Shrewsbury Town on loan for the 2020–21 season. He scored his first senior career goal on 4 September 2020, netting for Shrewsbury in a 4–3 away defeat to Middlesbrough in an EFL Cup match. On 29 December 2020 it was announced that his loan deal had ended. He joined Rotherham United on a season-long loan on 29 July 2022. However, his loan was terminated on 11 January 2023.

In September 2023 he signed on loan for Scottish club Ross County. On 8 January 2024, High returned to Huddersfield following a lack of playing time.

On 4 February 2024, High was loaned to League of Ireland Premier Division club Dundalk until the summer.

On 7 September 2024, High joined National League club FC Halifax Town on loan, initially until 3 November 2024. Halifax wanted to extend the loan, but due to injury it was not, although High returned to Halifax on loan in December 2024.

On 5 May 2025, Huddersfield announced the player would be released in June when his contract expired.

On 25 June 2025, Barnet confirmed they had signed High for the 2025–26 season. In October 2025 he moved on loan to Solihull Moors. On 12 December 2025, Solihull Moors confirmed that they had signed High on a permanent deal until the end of the 2026-27 season.

== International career ==
High was first named in the Scotland under-21 squad in August 2021. He made seven appearances without scoring.

== Career statistics ==
As of match played 6 December 2025

Club	Season	League			National Cup		League Cup		Other		Total	
Club	Season	Division	Apps	Goals	Apps	Goals	Apps	Goals	Apps	Goals	Apps	Goals
Huddersfield Town	2019–20	Championship	1	0	0	0	0	0	0	0	1	0
Huddersfield Town	2020–21	Championship	14	0	0	0	0	0	0	0	14	0
Huddersfield Town	2021–22	Championship	23	0	0	0	2	0	0	0	25	0
Huddersfield Town	2022–23	Championship	9	0	0	0	0	0	0	0	9	0
Huddersfield Town	2023–24	Championship	0	0	0	0	1	0	0	0	1	0
Huddersfield Town	2024–25	League One	0	0	0	0	0	0	0	0	0	0
Huddersfield Town	Total		47	0	0	0	3	0	0	0	50	0
Concord Rangers (loan)	2019–20	National League South	4	0	0	0	—		4 (Note: Three appearances in the FA Trophy; one appearance and one goal in the Essex Senior Cup.)	1	8	1
Shrewsbury Town (loan)	2020–21	League One	12	0	1	0	1	1	3 (Note: Appearance(s) in the EFL Trophy.)	1	17	2
Rotherham United (loan)	2022–23	Championship	13	0	0	0	2	0	—		15	0
Ross County (loan)	2023–24	Scottish Premiership	2	0	0	0	0	0	—		2	0
Dundalk (loan)	2024	LOI Premier Division	14	1	—		—		0	0	14	1
FC Halifax Town (loan)	2024–25	National League	21	2	1	0	—		1 (Note: One appearance in National League playoffs)	0	23	2
Barnet	2025–26	League Two	3	0	0	0	1	0	2	0	6	0
Solihull Moors (loan)	2025–26	National League	8	0	0	0	—		1 (Note: Appearance in National League Cup)	0	9	0
Solihull Moors	2025–26	National League	0	0	0	0	—		0	0	0	0
Career total			124	3	2	0	6	1	11	2	143	6
