= Ryan Schofield =

English footballer

Personal information
- Full name: Ryan James Schofield
- Date of birth: 11 December 1999 (age 26)
- Place of birth: Huddersfield, England
- Height: 1.90 m (6 ft 3 in)
- Position: Goalkeeper

Team information
- Current team: Coleraine
- Number: 1

Youth career
- –2008: Lepton Highlanders
- 2008–2017: Huddersfield Town

Senior career*
Years	Team	Apps	(Gls)
2017–2023	Huddersfield Town	33	(0)
2017	→ FC United of Manchester (loan)	5	(0)
2018	→ AFC Telford United (loan)	3	(0)
2019	→ Notts County (loan)	17	(0)
2020	→ Livingston (loan)	1	(0)
2022–2023	→ Hibernian (loan)	0	(0)
2023	→ Crawley Town (loan)	2	(0)
2023–2024	Portsmouth	0	(0)
2025	Morecambe	5	(0)
2025–	Coleraine	17	(0)

International career^{‡}
2017	England U18	1	(0)
2017	England U19	4	(0)
2017–2019	England U20	6	(0)
- * Club domestic league appearances and goals as of 29 April 2026 ‡ National team caps and goals as of 18:16, 6 June 2019 (UTC)

Ryan James Schofield (born 11 December 1999) is an English professional footballer who plays as a goalkeeper for Coleraine.

== Club career ==
In January 2019, Schofield joined Notts County on loan for the remainder of the 2018–19 season.

Schofield made his senior league debut for Huddersfield on 23 October 2019 against Middlesbrough. He was loaned to Scottish Premiership club Livingston in January 2020. Schofield was injured during his first appearance for Livingston, which forced them to sign another goalkeeper.

Schofield played regularly for Huddersfield during the 2020–21 season, but lost his place after a 5–1 defeat to Fulham in August 2021. He then injured his shoulder while playing in a FA Cup tie at Burnley in January 2022.

He was loaned to Hibernian in August 2022. He was recalled by Huddersfield in January 2023, without having made a first team appearance for Hibs.

He joined Portsmouth for the 2023 season. He was released in the summer of 2024.

In January 2025, Schofield joined League Two side Morecambe on a deal until the end of the season.

== International career ==
In March 2017, Schofield made an appearance for the England under-18 team against Qatar. Schofield was included in an England U20 squad for the 2017 Toulon Tournament. He saved a penalty during the shoot-out in the final as England defeated the Ivory Coast to win the tournament.

== Career statistics ==
As of end of 2023–24 season

Appearances and goals by club, season and competition
Club	Season	League			National Cup		League Cup		Other		Total	
Club	Season	Division	Apps	Goals	Apps	Goals	Apps	Goals	Apps	Goals	Apps	Goals
Huddersfield Town	2016–17	Championship	0	0	0	0	0	0	0	0	0	0
Huddersfield Town	2017–18	Premier League	0	0	0	0	0	0	—		0	0
Huddersfield Town	2018–19	Premier League	0	0	0	0	0	0	—		0	0
Huddersfield Town	2019–20	Championship	1	0	0	0	1	0	—		2	0
Huddersfield Town	2020–21	Championship	30	0	0	0	0	0	—		30	0
Huddersfield Town	2021–22	Championship	2	0	1	0	0	0	—		3	0
Huddersfield Town	2022–23	Championship	0	0	0	0	0	0	—		0	0
Huddersfield Town	Total		33	0	1	0	1	0	0	0	35	0
FC United of Manchester (loan)	2016–17	National League North	5	0	0	0	—		1 (Note: Appearance in Manchester Premier Cup)	0	6	0
AFC Telford United (loan)	2017–18	National League North	3	0	0	0	—		0	0	3	0
Notts County (loan)	2018–19	League Two	17	0	0	0	0	0	0	0	17	0
Livingston (loan)	2019–20	Scottish Premiership	1	0	2	0	0	0	—		3	0
Hibernian (loan)	2022–23	Scottish Premiership	0	0	0	0	0	0	—		0	0
Crawley Town (loan)	2022–23	League Two	2	0	0	0	0	0	0	0	2	0
Portsmouth	2023–24	League One	0	0	0	0	2	0	4 (Note: Appearances in EFL Trophy)	0	6	0
Career total			61	0	3	0	3	0	5	0	72	0

== Honours ==
England U20

- Toulon Tournament: 2017
