= Connor Shanks =

English footballer

Personal information
- Full name: Connor David Shanks
- Date of birth: 11 April 2002 (age 24)
- Place of birth: Halifax, West Yorkshire, England
- Height: 1.79 m (5 ft 10 in)
- Position: Midfielder

Team information
- Current team: Bradford (Park Avenue)

Youth career
- Huddersfield Town
- 2017–2020: Bradford City

Senior career*
Years	Team	Apps	(Gls)
2020–2021	Bradford City	0	(0)
2021–2023	Huddersfield Town	0	(0)
2021	→ Nuneaton Borough (loan)	8	(1)
2022	→ Boston United (loan)	0	(0)
2023–2024	Spennymoor Town	10	(0)
2023–2024	→ Bradford (Park Avenue) (loan)	9	(1)
2024	Gainsborough Trinity	7	(0)
2024–	Bradford (Park Avenue)	15	(5)
- * Club domestic league appearances and goals as of 12:01, 24 November 2024 (UTC)

Connor David Shanks (born 11 April 2002) is an English professional footballer who plays as a midfielder for Bradford (Park Avenue).

== Career ==
Born in Halifax, West Yorkshire, Shanks began his career with Huddersfield Town, joining Bradford City in 2017. He was named in the League Football Education's 'The 11' list in June 2020. He turned professional in July 2020, signing a one-year contract.

He made his senior debut for Bradford City on 8 September 2020, in the EFL Trophy.

On 12 May 2021 he was one of nine players that Bradford City announced would leave the club on 30 June 2021 when their contracts expire.

He signed for Huddersfield Town in August 2021, moving on loan to Nuneaton Borough in September 2021. On 24 March 2022, Shanks joined National League North side Boston United on a youth loan for the remainder of the 2021–22 season.

On 19 January 2023, Shanks' contract at Huddersfield was terminated in order to allow him to pursue other opportunities. He joined National League North club Spennymoor Town two days later. In November 2023 he signed on loan for Bradford (Park Avenue), extending the loan in December. In March 2024, Shanks left Spennymoor by the mutual consent. Later that month, he signed for Gainsborough Trinity.

In May 2024, Shanks returned to Bradford (Park Avenue) on a permanent short-term deal. He signed a new contract in November 2024, until the end of the season.

== Career statistics ==
As of match played 16 November 2024.

Appearances and goals by club, season and competition
Club	Season	League			FA Cup		League Cup		Other		Total	
Club	Season	Division	Apps	Goals	Apps	Goals	Apps	Goals	Apps	Goals	Apps	Goals
Bradford City	2020–21	League Two	0	0	0	0	0	0	3 (Note: Appearances in the Football League Trophy.)	0	3	0
Huddersfield Town	2021–22	Championship	0	0	0	0	0	0	0	0	0	0
Huddersfield Town	2022–23	Championship	0	0	0	0	0	0	0	0	0	0
Huddersfield Town	Total		0	0	0	0	0	0	0	0	0	0
Nuneaton Borough (loan)	2021–22	Southern Football League	8	1	0	0	0	0	3 (Note: Two appearances in the FA Trophy, one appearance and one goal in the Birmingham Senior Cup)	1	11	2
Boston United (loan)	2021–22	National League North	0	0	0	0	0	0	0	0	0	0
Spennymoor Town	2022–23	National League North	19	2	0	0	0	0	0	0	19	2
Spennymoor Town	2023–24	National League North	10	0	0	0	0	0	0	0	20	0
Spennymoor Town	Total		29	2	0	0	0	0	0	0	29	2
Bradford (Park Avenue) (loan)	2023–24	Northern Premier League	9	1	0	0	0	0	0	0	9	1
Gainsborough Trinity	2023–24	Northern Premier League	7	0	0	0	0	0	0	0	7	0
Bradford (Park Avenue)	2024–25	Northern Premier League	15	5	1	1	0	0	2 (Note: Appearances in the FA Trophy)	0	18	6
Career total			68	9	1	1	0	0	8	1	77	11
