= Naby Sarr =

Senegalese footballer (born 1993)

Personal information
- Full name: Mouhamadou-Naby Sarr
- Date of birth: 13 August 1993 (age 33)
- Place of birth: Marseille, France
- Height: 6 ft 6 in (1.98 m)
- Position: Centre back

Youth career
- 2008–2012: Lyon

Senior career*
Years	Team	Apps	(Gls)
2012–2014	Lyon	2	(0)
2014–2015	Sporting CP	8	(0)
2015–2020	Charlton Athletic (Note: Soccerbase incorrectly states that Sarr came on in the League One match Vs. Walsall on 26 September 2017 in a 2-2 draw. He was, in fact, an unused substitute for this game meaning his total league appearances for Charlton Athletic is 95 not 96. This non-appearance is confirmed at both Charlton Athletic's website and via the BBC.)	95	(6)
2016–2017	→ Red Star (loan)	22	(2)
2020–2022	Huddersfield Town	59	(7)
2022–2023	Reading	24	(1)
2023–2026	Al-Markhiya	45	(3)

International career^{‡}
2012–2014	France U20	12	(0)
2013–2014	France U21	2	(0)
Medal record
Representing France
Men's football
FIFA U-20 World Cup
Winner	2013 Turkey
- * Club domestic league appearances and goals as of 19 September 2024 (UTC) ‡ National team caps and goals as of 15:18, 7 January 2021 (UTC)

Mouhamadou-Naby Sarr (born 13 August 1993) is a French professional footballer who plays as centre back.

== Club career ==
Sarr made his senior debut with Lyon in the UEFA Europa League on 6 December 2012 against Hapoel Ironi Kiryat Shmona. He opened the score after 15 minutes, and Lyon won the game 2–0.

On 28 July 2015, Sarr joined Charlton Athletic on a five-year deal. He scored his first goal for the club against Huddersfield Town on 15 September 2015.

On 21 June 2016, Sarr joined Red Star on a season long loan deal.

On 15 December 2018, Sarr was sent off inside the first minute of Charlton's League One match against AFC Wimbledon, beating a club record previously held by Nicky Weaver.

On 11 September 2020, Sarr joined Huddersfield Town. He scored his first goal for Huddersfield in a 4–3 defeat against Stoke City on 21 November 2020.

On 1 June 2022, it was confirmed that Sarr had been released by Huddersfield Town at the end of his contract.

On 26 August 2022, after nearly a month with the club, Reading announced the signing of Sarr to a four-year contract.

On 12 June 2023, Sarr joined Al-Markhiya in the Qatar Stars League on a two-year contract.

== International career ==
Sarr has played for the France U20 and France U21, but because of his father's Senegalese heritage, he received a call-up to the Senegal national football team in November 2019.

== Personal life ==
Sarr is the son of the Senegalese footballer Boubacar Sarr.

== Career statistics ==
As of 24 February 2024

Appearances and goals by club, season and competition
Club	Season	League			National cup		League cup		Continental		Other		Total	
Club	Season	Division	Apps	Goals	Apps	Goals	Apps	Goals	Apps	Goals	Apps	Goals	Apps	Goals
Lyon	2012–13	Ligue 1	0	0	0	0	0	0	1 (Note: One appearance in the UEFA Europa League)	1	—		1	1
Lyon	2013–14	Ligue 1	2	0	0	0	0	0	2 (Note: Two appearances in the UEFA Europa League)	0	—		4	0
Lyon	Total		2	0	0	0	0	0	3	1	0	0	5	1
Sporting CP	2014–15	Primeira Liga	8	0	2	0	4	0	4 (Note: Four appearances in the UEFA Champions League)	1	—		18	1
Charlton Athletic	2015–16	Championship	12	1	1	0	3	1	—		—		16	2
Charlton Athletic	2016–17	League One	0	0	0	0	0	0	—		0	0	0	0
Charlton Athletic	2017–18	League One	18	0	2	0	2	0	—		3 (Note: Two appearances in the EFL Trophy and one in the League One play-offs)	0	25	0
Charlton Athletic	2018–19	League One	36	2	3	0	0	0	—		5 (Note: Two appearances in the EFL Trophy and three in the League One play-offs)	1	44	3
Charlton Athletic	2019–20	Championship	29	3	1	0	1	0	—		—		31	3
Charlton Athletic	Total		95	6	7	0	6	1	0	0	8	1	116	8
Red Star (loan)	2016–17	Ligue 2	22	2	1	1	1	0	—		—		24	3
Huddersfield Town	2020–21	Championship	41	4	0	0	0	0	—		—		41	4
Huddersfield Town	2021–22	Championship	18	3	3	0	1	0	—		3 (Note: Three appearances in the Championship play-offs)	0	25	3
Huddersfield Town	Total		59	7	3	0	1	0	0	0	3	0	66	7
Reading	2022–23	Championship	24	1	1	0	0	0	—		—		25	1
Al-Markhiya	2023–24	Qatar Stars League	13	0	3	0	—		—		—		16	0
Career total			223	16	17	1	12	1	7	2	11	1	270	21

== Honours ==
Sporting CP

- Taça de Portugal: 2014–15

Charlton Athletic

- EFL League One play-offs: 2019

France U20

- FIFA U-20 World Cup: 2013
