= 2021–22 Huddersfield Town A.F.C. season =

Huddersfield Town
2021–22 season
- Chairman: Phil Hodgkinson
- Head Coach: Carlos Corberán
- Stadium: John Smith's Stadium
- Championship: 3rd
- Play-offs: Runners-up (eliminated by Nottingham Forest)
- FA Cup: Fifth round (eliminated by Nottingham Forest)
- EFL Cup: Second round (eliminated by Everton)
- Top goalscorer: League: Danny Ward (14); All: Danny Ward (14)
- Highest home attendance: 23,507 vs. Luton Town (16 May 2022)
- Lowest home attendance: 10,459 vs. Everton (24 August 2021)
- Biggest win: 4–0 vs. Reading (28 August 2021)
- Biggest defeat: 1–5 vs. Fulham (14 August 2021)
Home colours	Away colours	Third colours

The 2021–22 season was Huddersfield Town's 113th year in their history and third consecutive season in the Championship. Along with the league, the club also competed in the FA Cup and the EFL Cup. The season covers the period from 1 July 2021 to 30 June 2022.

Following the departure of Christopher Schindler at the end of the previous season, Jonathan Hogg was confirmed as the new captain on 29 June 2021.

== First-team squad ==
As of the end of the 2021–22 season.

No.	Player	Nationality	Date of birth	Signed From	Apps	Goals
Goalkeepers
18	Jamal Blackman	(England)	27 October 1993 (aged 28)	(United States) Los Angeles FC	3	0
21	Lee Nicholls	(England)	5 October 1992 (aged 29)	(England) Milton Keynes Dons	48	0
31	Ryan Schofield	(England)	11 December 1999 (aged 22)	(England) Huddersfield Town B	35	0
Defenders
2	Pipa	(Spain)	26 January 1998 (aged 24)	(Spain) Espanyol	54	2
3	Harry Toffolo	(England)	19 August 1995 (aged 26)	(England) Lincoln City	99	9
4	Matty Pearson	(England)	3 August 1993 (aged 28)	(England) Luton Town	42	4
14	Josh Ruffels	(England)	23 October 1993 (aged 28)	(England) Oxford United	11	0
20	Ollie Turton	(England)	6 December 1992 (aged 29)	(England) Blackpool	44	0
23	Naby Sarr	(Senegal)	13 August 1993 (aged 28)	(England) Charlton Athletic	66	7
26	Levi Colwill	(England)	26 February 2003 (aged 19)	(England) Chelsea	32	2
32	Tom Lees	(England)	28 November 1990 (aged 31)	(England) Sheffield Wednesday	47	5
Midfielders
5	Álex Vallejo	(Spain)	16 January 1992 (aged 30)	(Spain) Fuenlabrada	23	1
6	Jonathan Hogg	(England)	6 December 1988 (aged 33)	(England) Watford	307	5
7	Tino Anjorin	(England)	23 November 2001 (aged 20)	(England) Chelsea	8	1
8	Lewis O'Brien	(England)	14 October 1998 (aged 23)	(England) Huddersfield Town B	132	8
11	Rolando Aarons	(Jamaica)	16 November 1995 (aged 26)	(England) Newcastle United	12	0
15	Scott High	(Scotland)	15 February 2001 (aged 21)	(England) Huddersfield Town B	40	0
16	Sorba Thomas	(Wales)	25 January 1999 (aged 23)	(England) Boreham Wood	58	3
19	Duane Holmes	(United States)	6 November 1994 (aged 27)	(England) Derby County	90	9
24	Danel Sinani	(Luxembourg)	5 April 1997 (aged 25)	(England) Norwich City	47	7
28	Danny Grant	(Republic of Ireland)	23 December 1999 (aged 22)	(Republic of Ireland) Bohemians	0	0
37	Jon Russell	(Jamaica)	9 October 2001 (aged 20)	(England) Chelsea	22	2
48	Carel Eiting	(Netherlands)	11 February 1998 (aged 24)	(Belgium) Genk	30	3
Forwards
9	Jordan Rhodes	(Scotland)	5 February 1990 (aged 32)	(England) Sheffield Wednesday	174	91
10	Josh Koroma	(England)	8 November 1998 (aged 23)	(England) Leyton Orient	68	13
22	Fraizer Campbell	(England)	13 September 1987 (aged 34)	(England) Hull City	94	10
25	Danny Ward	(England)	11 December 1991 (aged 30)	(Wales) Cardiff City	207	36

== Transfers ==
=== Transfers in ===
Date	Position	Nationality	Name	From	Fee	Ref.
1 July 2021	CM	(England)	Dylan Helliwell	(England) Manchester City	Free transfer	
1 July 2021	GK	(England)	Lee Nicholls	(England) Milton Keynes Dons	Free transfer	
1 July 2021	CB	(England)	Matty Pearson	(England) Luton Town	Free transfer	
1 July 2021	MF	(England)	Cian Philpott	(England) Manchester City	Free transfer	
1 July 2021	CF	(Scotland)	Jordan Rhodes	(England) Sheffield Wednesday	Free transfer	
1 July 2021	LB	(England)	Josh Ruffels	(England) Oxford United	Free transfer	
1 July 2021	RB	(England)	Ollie Turton	(England) Blackpool	Free transfer	
15 July 2021	FW	(England)	Tyree Sanusi	(England) Birmingham City	Undisclosed	
19 July 2021	CM	(Jamaica)	Jon Russell	(England) Chelsea	Free transfer	
1 August 2021	CB	(England)	Tom Lees	(England) Sheffield Wednesday	Free transfer	
13 August 2021	AM	(England)	Connor Shanks	(England) Bradford City	Free transfer	
31 January 2022	GK	(England)	Jamal Blackman	(United States) Los Angeles	Free transfer	
31 January 2022	DM	(Netherlands)	Carel Eiting	(Belgium) Genk	Free transfer	

=== Loans in ===
Date from	Position	Nationality	Name	From	Date until	Ref.
1 July 2021	CB	(England)	Levi Colwill	(England) Chelsea	End of season	
28 July 2021	AM	(Luxembourg)	Danel Sinani	(England) Norwich City	End of season	
30 August 2021	CF	(Republic of Ireland)	Mipo Odubeko	(England) West Ham United	4 January 2022	
31 January 2022	AM	(England)	Tino Anjorin	(England) Chelsea	End of season	

=== Loans out ===
Date from	Position	Nationality	Name	To	Date until	Ref.
12 July 2021	CF	(England)	Kieran Phillips	(England) Walsall	28 January 2022 (Note: On 28 January, Phillips was recalled from his loan at Walsall.)	
29 July 2021	GK	(Australia)	Jacob Chapman	(England) Gateshead	31 January 2022 (Note: On 31 January, Chapman was recalled early from his loan spell at Gateshead.)	
4 August 2021	CB	(England)	Rarmani Edmonds-Green	(England) Rotherham United	End of season	
5 August 2021	AM	(England)	Matty Daly	(England) Hartlepool United	17 January 2022 (Note: On 17 January, Daly was recalled from his loan spell at Hartlepool United.)	
6 August 2021	CB	(England)	Romoney Crichlow	(England) Swindon Town	13 January 2022 (Note: On 13 January, Crichlow was recalled early from his loan spell at Swindon Town.)	
9 August 2021	DM	(Albania)	Ernaldo Krasniqi	(Scotland) Falkirk	4 January 2022	
24 August 2021	GK	(Uganda)	Giosue Bellagambi	(England) Stalybridge Celtic	21 September 2021	
9 September 2021	CB	(England)	David Adewoju	(England) Ossett United	Work experience	
21 September 2021	AM	(England)	Connor Shanks	(England) Nuneaton Borough	17 October 2021	
8 October 2021	CB	(England)	Nassim Kherbouche	(England) Farsley Celtic	November 2021	
30 October 2021	CB	(Republic of the Congo)	Loick Ayina	(England) Boston United	December 2021	
30 October 2021	CM	(England)	Sonny Whittingham	(England) Northallerton Town	December 2021	
23 November 2021	CM	(England)	Ben Midgley	(England) Nuneaton Borough	22 December 2021	
17 December 2021	GK	(Uganda)	Giosue Bellagambi	(England) Brighouse Town	15 January 2022	
18 December 2021	LB	(England)	Jaheim Headley	(England) Yeovil Town	15 January 2022	
4 January 2022	AM	(England)	Josh Austerfield	(England) Harrogate Town	End of season	
4 January 2022	AM	(France)	Brahima Diarra	(England) Harrogate Town	End of season	
7 January 2022	CF	(England)	Kian Harratt	(England) Port Vale	End of season	
13 January 2022	CB	(England)	Romoney Crichlow	(England) Plymouth Argyle	End of season	
18 January 2022	AM	(England)	Matty Daly	(England) Bradford City	End of season	
28 January 2022	LB	(England)	Ben Jackson	(England) Doncaster Rovers	End of season	
31 January 2022	GK	(Australia)	Nicholas Bilokapic	(England) Hartlepool United	End of season	
31 January 2022	CM	(England)	Reece Brown	(England) Peterborough United	End of season	
31 January 2022	CF	(England)	Kieran Phillips	(England) Exeter City	End of season	
25 February 2022	MF	(England)	Sam Peplow	(England) Hyde United	March 2022	

=== Transfers out ===
Date	Position	Nationality	Name	To	Fee	Ref.
30 June 2021	CB	(England)	Tom Bamford		Released	
30 June 2021	AM	(England)	Darnel Baxter-Alleyne		Released	
30 June 2021	LB	(England)	Jaden Brown	(England) Sheffield Wednesday	Released	
30 June 2021	RB	(England)	Demeaco Duhaney	(England) Stoke City	Released	
30 June 2021	CF	(England)	Andre Edionhon		Released	
30 June 2021	CB	(England)	Tommy Elphick	—N/a	Retired	
30 June 2021	CB	(Republic of Ireland)	Richard Keogh	(England) Blackpool	Released	
30 June 2021	GK	(Canada)	Jayson Leutwiler	(England) Oldham Athletic	Released	
30 June 2021	MF	(England)	Will McCamley	(England) Shildon	Released	
30 June 2021	CF	(Senegal)	Oumar Niasse	(England) Burton Albion	Released	
30 June 2021	RB	(Sint Maarten)	Ilounga Pata	(Netherlands) TOP Oss	Released	
30 June 2021	AM	(England)	Alex Pritchard	(England) Sunderland	Released	
30 June 2021	CF	(France)	Yaya Sanogo		Released	
30 June 2021	CB	(Germany)	Christopher Schindler	(Germany) Nürnberg	Released	
30 June 2021	CF	(Wales)	Robson Shipley		Released	
30 June 2021	CB	(England)	Richard Stearman	(England) Derby County	Released	
30 June 2021	RW	(Sweden)	Gulutte Zunda		Released	
19 August 2021	DM	(Curaçao)	Juninho Bacuna	(Scotland) Rangers	Undisclosed	
6 September 2021	RW	(Belgium)	Isaac Mbenza	Qatar SC	Released	

== Pre-season friendlies ==
Huddersfield Town announced they would play friendly matches against Harrogate Town, Southport, a double header against Norwich City (later reduced to one game), Fleetwood Town, Crewe Alexandra and Oldham Athletic as part of their pre-season preparations. The games against Crewe and Oldham would later be cancelled due to Town arranging to have their EFL Cup match against Sheffield Wednesday played that same weekend.

Win Draw Loss Fixtures

10 July 2021 Friendly	Huddersfield Town	1–0	Harrogate Town	Huddersfield
13:00 BST	Koroma 13'	Report		Stadium: Canalside Sports Complex; Attendance: 0 (Played behind closed doors)

13 July 2021 Friendly	Golcar United	2–2	Huddersfield Town XI	Golcar
19:00 BST	Skarz 50'; Willetts 70'	Report	O'Brien-Brady 24'; Whittingham 47'	Stadium: Skye Direct Stadium; Attendance: 700

17 July 2021 Friendly	Southport	0–2	Huddersfield Town	Southport
15:00 BST		Report	Anson 2' (o.g.); Holmes 41'	Stadium: Pure Stadium

23 July 2021 Friendly	Norwich City	2–0	Huddersfield Town	Norwich
13:30 BST	Pukki 14'; Idah 86'	Report		Stadium: Lotus Training Centre; Attendance: 0 (Played behind closed doors)

27 July 2021 Friendly	Fleetwood Town	2–1	Huddersfield Town	Fleetwood
19:00 BST	Morris 5'; Garner 30'	Report	O'Brien 78'	Stadium: Highbury Stadium

== Competitions ==
=== Overview ===
Competition	First match	Last match	Starting round	Final position	Record							
Competition	First match	Last match	Starting round	Final position	Pld	W	D	L	GF	GA	GD	Win %
EFL Championship	7 August 2021	7 May 2022	Matchday 1	3rd Place	46	23	13	10	64	47	+17	50.00
Play-Offs	13 May 2022	29 May 2022	Semi-finals	Runners-up	3	1	1	1	2	2	+0	33.33
FA Cup	8 January 2022	7 March 2022	Third round	Fifth round	3	2	0	1	4	3	+1	66.67
EFL Cup	1 August 2021	24 August 2021	First round	Second round	2	0	1	1	1	2	−1	0.00
Total					54	26	15	13	71	54	+17	48.15

Source: Competitions

=== EFL Championship ===
==== League table ====
Pos	Team	Pld	W	D	L	GF	GA	GD	Pts	Promotion, qualification or relegation
1	Fulham (C, P)	46	27	9	10	106	43	+63	90	Promotion to the Premier League
2	Bournemouth (P)	46	25	13	8	74	39	+35	88	Promotion to the Premier League
3	Huddersfield Town	46	23	13	10	64	47	+17	82	Qualification for Championship play-offs
4	Nottingham Forest (O, P)	46	23	11	12	73	40	+33	80	Qualification for Championship play-offs
5	Sheffield United	46	21	12	13	63	45	+18	75	Qualification for Championship play-offs
6	Luton Town	46	21	12	13	63	55	+8	75	Qualification for Championship play-offs

Source: EFL Official Website
Rules for classification: 1) Points; 2) Goal difference; 3) Number of goals scored; 4) Head-to-head results; 5) Wins; 6) Away goals; 7) Penalty points (sec 9.5); 8) 12-point sending off offences
(C) Champions; (O) Play-off winners; (P) Promoted

==== Results summary ====
Overall								Home						Away					
Pld	W	D	L	GF	GA	GD	Pts	W	D	L	GF	GA	GD	W	D	L	GF	GA	GD
46	23	13	10	64	47	+17	82	13	6	4	35	23	+12	10	7	6	29	24	+5

Last updated: 7 May 2022.

==== Results by matchday ====
Matchday	1	2	3	4	5	6	7	8	9	10	11	12	13	14	15	16	17	18	19	20	21	22	23	24	25	26	27	28	29	30	31	32	33	34	35	36	37	38	39	40	41	42	43	44	45	46
Ground	A	H	H	A	H	A	A	H	A	H	A	H	H	A	H	A	A	H	A	H	A	H	A	H	A	A	H	A	H	H	A	H	A	H	A	H	A	A	H	A	H	H	A	H	A	H
Result	D	L	W	W	W	L	W	L	L	W	D	W	D	L	W	D	L	W	L	L	D	D	W	W	W	D	D	W	D	W	D	D	W	W	W	W	D	L	L	W	W	D	W	W	W	W
Position	10	22	15	10	4	8	4	7	7	7	7	6	6	8	5	7	8	7	8	8	11	10	10	6	6	6	7	6	6	5	5	5	5	4	3	2	2	3	4	3	3	3	3	3	4	3

Updated to match(es) played on 7 May 2022. Source: Statto.com
A = Away; H = Home; W = Win; D = Draw; L = Loss

==== Matches ====
Huddersfield Town's fixtures were announced on 24 June 2021.

7 August 2021 1	Derby County	1–1	Huddersfield Town	Derby
15:00 BST	Byrne (yellow card) 25'; Davies 39'; Watson (yellow card) 50'; Sibley (yellow card) 80'	Report	Turton (yellow card) 14'; Sarr 45'; Holmes (yellow card) 88'	Stadium: Pride Park Stadium; Attendance: 16,249; Referee: Geoff Eltringham

14 August 2021 2	Huddersfield Town	1–5	Fulham	Huddersfield
15:00 BST	Pearson 41'; Colwill (yellow card) 73'	Report	Mitrović 9'; Onomah 37'; Decordova-Reid (yellow card) 39'; Carvalho 42'; Wilson (red card) 72'; Cavaleiro 78', 90+5'	Stadium: John Smith's Stadium; Attendance: 15,126; Referee: Dean Whitestone

17 August 2021 3	Huddersfield Town	1–0	Preston North End	Huddersfield
19:45 BST	Campbell (yellow card) 56'; Sarr (yellow card) 68' van den Berg 74' (o.g.); Nicholls (yellow card) 80'		Lindsay (yellow card) 41'; Whiteman (yellow card) 64'	Stadium: John Smith's Stadium; Attendance: 15,278; Referee: James Linington
Note: Live on Sky Sports

21 August 2021 4	Sheffield United	1–2	Huddersfield Town	Sheffield
15:00 BST	Sharp 90+2'		Turton (yellow card) 36'; Colwill (yellow card) 40' (goal) 90+4'; Koroma 75'; Nicholls (yellow card) 87'	Stadium: Bramall Lane; Attendance: 28,036; Referee: Michael Salisbury

28 August 2021 5	Huddersfield Town	4–0	Reading	Huddersfield
15:00 BST	Thomas (yellow card) 31' (goal) 66'; O'Brien 39'; Pearson 51' (yellow card) 59'; Ward 68'; Lees (yellow card) 81'	Report	Yiadom (yellow card) 23'; Dele-Bashiru (yellow card) 51'	Stadium: John Smith's Stadium; Attendance: 14,613; Referee: Leigh Doughty

11 September 2021 6	Stoke City	2–1	Huddersfield Town	Stoke-on-Trent
15:00 BST	Brown 50'; Pearson 63' (o.g.); Vrančić (yellow card) 82'; Allen (yellow card) 85'		Toffolo 47'; Lees (yellow card) 49'; Campbell (yellow card) 58'; Holmes (yellow card) 62'	Stadium: bet365 Stadium; Attendance: 20,447; Referee: Joshua Smith

14 September 2021 7	Blackpool	0–3	Huddersfield Town	Blackpool
19:45 BST			Pearson (yellow card) 34' (goal) 54'; Koroma 48'; Hogg 62'	Stadium: Bloomfield Road; Attendance: 11,277; Referee: Thomas Bramall

18 September 2021 8	Huddersfield Town	0–2	Nottingham Forest	Huddersfield
15:00 BST	Ward (yellow card) 15'; Turton (yellow card) 61'		Grabban 22'; Nicholls 48' (o.g.); Garner (yellow card) 68'	Stadium: John Smith's Stadium; Attendance: 17,462; Referee: Chris Kavanagh

25 September 2021 9	Swansea City	1–0	Huddersfield Town	Swansea
15:00 BST	Piroe 17'; Naughton (yellow card) 82'; Smith (yellow card) 89'		Holmes (yellow card) 88'; Colwill (yellow card) 89'	Stadium: Swansea.com Stadium; Attendance: 17,091; Referee: Gavin Ward

28 September 2021 10	Huddersfield Town	3–2	Blackburn Rovers	Huddersfield
19:45 BST	Vallejo 36'; Ward 60', 84'; Sarr (yellow card) 63'; Nicholls (yellow card) 90+3'		Brereton 57', 65' (pen.)	Stadium: John Smith's Stadium; Attendance: 15,283; Referee: Jeremy Simpson

2 October 2021 11	Luton Town	0–0	Huddersfield Town	Luton
15:00 BST	Rea (yellow card) 32'; Jerome (yellow card) 89'		Thomas (yellow card) 42'; Lees (yellow card) 58'; Sarr (yellow card) 80'	Stadium: Kenilworth Road; Attendance: 9,977; Referee: Leigh Doughty

16 October 2021 12	Huddersfield Town	2–0	Hull City	Huddersfield
15:00 BST	Colwill (yellow card) 1'; Lees 9'; Holmes 73'		Smallwood (yellow card) 28'; Honeyman (yellow card) 43'	Stadium: John Smith's Stadium; Attendance: 17,510; Referee: Robert Jones

20 October 2021 13	Huddersfield Town	0–0	Birmingham City	Huddersfield
19:45 BST	Colwill (yellow card) 24'; Pearson (yellow card) 40'; Lees (yellow card) 85'		McGree (yellow card) 83'	Stadium: John Smith's Stadium; Attendance: 15,618; Referee: Andy Woolmer

23 October 2021 14	AFC Bournemouth	3–0	Huddersfield Town	Boscombe
15:00 BST	Solanke 10' (pen.), 21'; Anthony (yellow card) 18'; Kilkenny (yellow card) 29'; Kelly 64'			Stadium: Vitality Stadium; Attendance: 9,253; Referee: John Brooks

30 October 2021 15	Huddersfield Town	1–0	Millwall	Huddersfield
15:00 BST	Hogg 82'; Koroma (yellow card) 85'; Thomas (yellow card) 90+1'; Campbell (yellow card) 90+2'		Saville (yellow card) 34'; Leonard (yellow card) 85'	Stadium: John Smith's Stadium; Attendance: 15,397; Referee: Geoff Eltringham

2 November 2021 16	Peterborough United	1–1	Huddersfield Town	Peterborough
19:45 GMT	Norburn (yellow card) 36'; Thompson (yellow card) 54'; Taylor (yellow card) 81'; Clarke-Harris 84'	Report	Thomas (yellow card) 45'; Toffolo (yellow card) 52'; Ward 74'; O'Brien (yellow card) 83'	Stadium: Weston Homes Stadium; Attendance: 7,983; Referee: Keith Stroud

6 November 2021 17	Cardiff City	2–1	Huddersfield Town	Leckwith
15:00 GMT	McGuiness (yellow card) 60'; Moore 74', 90+3'; Bacuna (yellow card) 84'; Vaulks (yellow card) 90+1'; Ng (yellow card) 90+5'	Report	Sinani 12'; High (yellow card) 90+4'	Stadium: Cardiff City Stadium; Attendance: 17,355; Referee: David Webb

20 November 2021 18	Huddersfield Town	1–0	West Bromwich Albion	Huddersfield
15:00 GMT	Sinani 6'; Turton (yellow card) 49'		Kipré (yellow card) 24'; Diangana (yellow card) 50'; Livermore (red card) 78'	Stadium: John Smith's Stadium; Attendance: 17,297; Referee: Tim Robinson

24 November 2021 19	Queens Park Rangers	1–0	Huddersfield Town	White City
19:45 GMT	Chair (yellow card) 27'; Dozzell (yellow card) 56'; Amos 81'	Report	Koroma (yellow card) 10'; O'Brien (yellow card) 63'	Stadium: Kiyan Prince Foundation Stadium; Attendance: 11,591; Referee: Graham Scott

27 November 2021 20	Huddersfield Town	1–2	Middlesbrough	Huddersfield
15:00 GMT	Daniels 90+3' (o.g.)	Report	Watmore 16', 23'; Bola (yellow card) 80'; Crooks (yellow card) 85'; McNair (yellow card) 88'	Stadium: John Smith's Stadium; Attendance: 19,192; Referee: Thomas Bramall

4 December 2021 21	Barnsley	1–1	Huddersfield Town	Barnsley
15:00 GMT	Morris 45+2', (yellow card) 90+2'; Helik (yellow card) 71'	Report	O'Brien 33'	Stadium: Oakwell; Attendance: 15,190; Referee: Matthew Donohue

11 December 2021 22	Huddersfield Town	1–1	Coventry City	Huddersfield
12:30 GMT	Ward 18'; Holmes (yellow card) 45+2'; O'Brien (yellow card) 61'		Kelly (yellow card) 45+1'; Godden 90+3'	Stadium: John Smith's Stadium; Attendance: 16,493; Referee: Joshua Smith
Note: Live on Sky Sports

18 December 2021 23	Bristol City	2–3	Huddersfield Town	Ashton Gate
15:00 GMT	Weimann 2', 90+7'	Report	Ward (penalty missed) 6' 55'; Thomas (yellow card) 21'; Holmes 41'; Sinani 46'; O'Brien (yellow card) 57'	Stadium: Ashton Gate Stadium; Attendance: 18,169; Referee: Dean Whitestone

26 December 2021 24	Huddersfield Town	3–2	Blackpool	Huddersfield
15:00 GMT	Ward 3'; Toffolo (yellow card) 33'; Holmes (yellow card) 79'; Thomas 80', 84'	Report	Yates 1'; Madine 18'; Lawrence-Gabriel (yellow card) 45+10' (yellow-red card) 61'	Stadium: John Smith's Stadium; Attendance: 18,968; Referee: Jeremy Simpson

30 December 2021 25	Nottingham Forest	0–1	Huddersfield Town	West Bridgford
19:45 GMT	Worrall (yellow card) 28'	Report	Holmes (yellow card) 14' (goal) 30'; Nicholls (yellow card) 78'	Stadium: City Ground; Attendance: 27,159; Referee: Gavin Ward
Note: Live on Sky Sports

2 January 2022 26	Blackburn Rovers	0–0	Huddersfield Town	Blackburn
14:15 GMT	Travis (yellow card) 33'; Buckley (yellow card) 38' van Hecke (yellow card) 84'	Report	High (yellow card) 14'; Holmes (yellow card) 80'	Stadium: Ewood Park; Attendance: 16,313; Referee: Keith Stroud

15 January 2022 27	Huddersfield Town	1–1	Swansea City	Huddersfield
15:00 GMT	Sinani 15'	Report	Downes 78'	Stadium: John Smith's Stadium; Attendance: 20,535; Referee: David Webb

22 January 2022 28	Reading	3–4	Huddersfield Town	Reading
15:00 GMT	João 5'; Pușcaș 22'; Yiadom (yellow card) 26'; Morrison 45' (yellow card) 80'; Laurent (yellow card) 52'	Report	Sinani 9'; Ward 15', 25', 53'; Nicholls (yellow card) 71'	Stadium: Select Car Leasing Stadium; Attendance: 10,796; Referee: Robert Jones

28 January 2022 29	Huddersfield Town	1–1	Stoke City	Huddersfield
19:45 GMT	Koroma 27'; Nicholls (yellow card) 79'; O'Brien (yellow card) 83'	Report	Thompson (yellow card) 5'; Wilmot (yellow card) 44'; Brown 78'; Campbell (yellow card) 79'	Stadium: John Smith's Stadium; Attendance: 16,342; Referee: Gavin Ward
Note: Live on Sky Sports

2 February 2022 30	Huddersfield Town	2–0	Derby County	Huddersfield
19:45 GMT	Holmes 75'; Rhodes 79'; O'Brien (yellow card) 90+3'		Stearman (red card) 3'; Ebosele (yellow card) 62'; Davies (yellow card) 73'; Byrne (yellow card) 90+4'	Stadium: John Smith's Stadium; Attendance: 16,231; Referee: Matthew Donohue

9 February 2022 31	Preston North End	0–0	Huddersfield Town	Preston
19:45 GMT	Potts (yellow card) 72'	Report	Holmes (yellow card) 80'; O'Brien (yellow card) 89'	Stadium: Deepdale; Attendance: 11,120; Referee: Robert Jones
Note: Live on Sky Sports

12 February 2022 32	Huddersfield Town	0–0	Sheffield United	Huddersfield
12:30 GMT	Hogg (yellow card) 90+3'		Berge (yellow card) 17'; Robinson (yellow card) 69'; McBurnie (yellow card) 73'; Fleck (yellow card) 90'	Stadium: John Smith's Stadium; Attendance: 17,523; Referee: James Linington
Note: Live on Sky Sports

19 February 2022 33	Fulham	1–2	Huddersfield Town	Fulham
12:30 GMT	Mitrović (yellow card) 26'; Decordova-Reid 83'; Carvalho (yellow card) 88'	Report	Ward 31'; Holmes 43' (pen.); Hogg (yellow card) 61'	Stadium: Craven Cottage; Attendance: 19,001; Referee: Tony Harrington
Note: Live on Sky Sports

23 February 2022 34	Huddersfield Town	2–1	Cardiff City	Huddersfield
19:45 GMT	Koroma 88'; Russell (yellow card) 90+1' (goal) 90+6'; Thomas (yellow card) 90+8'	Report	McGuinness (yellow card) 13'; Doyle 61' (yellow card) 76'; Harris (yellow card) 74'; Hugill (yellow card) 79'; Bagan (yellow card) 85'; Smithies (yellow card) 90+2'; Vaulks (yellow card) 90+5'	Stadium: John Smith's Stadium; Attendance: 20,167; Referee: Oliver Langford

26 February 2022 35	Small Heath Alliance (Note: Birmingham City changed the name of their team to Small Heath Alliance for this game as part of a sponsorship deal with the TV show Peaky Blinders.)	0–2	Huddersfield Town	Bordesley
15:00 GMT			Colwill 27'; O'Brien 44'	Stadium: St Andrew's; Attendance: 17,318; Referee: David Webb

4 March 2022 36	Huddersfield Town	3–0	Peterborough United	Huddersfield
19:45 GMT	Sinani 3'; Lees 7', 72'		Norburn (yellow card) 28'	Stadium: John Smith's Stadium; Attendance: 16,023; Referee: Darren Bond

11 March 2022 37	West Bromwich Albion	2–2	Huddersfield Town	West Bromwich
20:00 GMT	Townsend (yellow card) 25'; Gardner-Hickman (yellow card) 70'; Clarke (yellow card) 72'; Grant 84' (pen.); Carroll 85'		Ward 24', 74'; Thomas (yellow card) 82'; Hogg (yellow card) 90+1'	Stadium: The Hawthorns; Attendance: 20,846; Referee: Matthew Donohue
Note: Live on Sky Sports

16 March 2022 38	Millwall	2–0	Huddersfield Town	Bermondsey
19:45 GMT	Bennett (yellow card) 13'; Afobe 27', 57'; J. Wallace (yellow card) 34'			Stadium: The Den; Attendance: 10,792; Referee: James Linington
Note: Live on Sky Sports

19 March 2022 39	Huddersfield Town	0–3	AFC Bournemouth	Huddersfield
15:00 GMT		Report	Anthony 19'; Lerma 31' (yellow card) 62'; Travers (yellow card) 36'; Christie (yellow card) 39'; Solanke 46'	Stadium: John Smith's Stadium; Attendance: 20,336; Referee: Simon Hooper

1 April 2022 40	Hull City	0–1	Huddersfield Town	Kingston upon Hull
19:45 BST	Eaves (yellow card) 11' (yellow-red card) 45+2'; Fleming (yellow card) 41'; Docherty (yellow card) 78'	Report	Thomas (yellow card) 41'; Toffolo 79'	Stadium: MKM Stadium; Attendance: 12,764; Referee: Jeremy Simpson
Note: Live on Sky Sports

11 April 2022 41	Huddersfield Town	2–0	Luton Town	Huddersfield
19:45 BST	Russell 59'; Thomas (yellow card) 71'; Nicholls (yellow card) 86'; Sarr 89'; Toffolo (yellow card) 90+1'	Report	Adebayo (penalty missed) 70'; Naismith (yellow card) 71'; Onyedinma (yellow card) 71'	Stadium: John Smith's Stadium; Attendance: 18,379; Referee: Geoff Eltringham
Note: Live on Sky Sports

15 April 2022 42	Huddersfield Town	2–2	Queens Park Rangers	Huddersfield
17:30 BST	Barbet 6' (o.g.); Toffolo 53'; O'Brien (yellow card) 64'; Holmes (yellow card) 66'; Thomas (yellow card) 90+1'		Amos 43'; Chair 58'; Austin (yellow card) 90+2'; Field (yellow card) 90+5'	Stadium: John Smith's Stadium; Attendance: 19,636; Referee: Leigh Doughty
Note: Live on Sky Sports

18 April 2022 43	Middlesbrough	0–2	Huddersfield Town	Middlesbrough
12:30 BST	Bamba (yellow card) 44'; McGree (yellow card) 68'; Bola (yellow card) 70'		Toffolo (yellow card) 36'; Sarr 41'; Rhodes 60'; O'Brien (yellow card) 76'; Russell (yellow card) 79'	Stadium: Riverside Stadium; Attendance: 24,230; Referee: Darren England
Note: Live on Sky Sports

22 April 2022 44	Huddersfield Town	2–1	Barnsley	Huddersfield
19:45 BST	Rhodes 4'; Toffolo 45+1'		Wolfe (yellow card) 51'; Kitching (yellow card) 52'; Palmer (yellow card) 56'; Styles 90+7'	Stadium: John Smith's Stadium; Attendance: 17,258; Referee: James Linington
Note: Live on Sky Sports

30 April 2022 45	Coventry City	1–2	Huddersfield Town	Coventry
15:00 BST	Kane (yellow card) 70'; Gyökeres 90'		Toffolo 45'; Anjorin 79' (pen.)	Stadium: Coventry Building Society Arena; Attendance: 23,828; Referee: Tony Harrington

7 May 2022 46	Huddersfield Town	2–0	Bristol City	Huddersfield
12:30 BST	Toffolo 33'; Pipa (yellow card) 35'; Ward 44'; Eiting (yellow card) 84'		Scott (yellow card) 53'	Stadium: John Smith's Stadium; Attendance: 17,797; Referee: David Webb

=== Play-offs ===
13 May 2022 Semi-Final 1st Leg	Luton Town	1–1	Huddersfield Town	Luton
19:45 BST	Bradley 30'; Naismith (yellow card) 57'	Report	Sinani 12'; Rhodes (yellow card) 90+1'	Stadium: Kenilworth Road; Attendance: 10,005; Referee: Robert Jones

16 May 2022 Semi-Final 2nd Leg	Huddersfield Town	1–0 (2–1 agg.)	Luton Town	Huddersfield
19:45 BST	Rhodes 82'		Clark (yellow card) 59'; Naismith (yellow card) 64'; Jerome (yellow card) 81'	Stadium: John Smith's Stadium; Attendance: 23,507; Referee: Peter Bankes

29 May 2022 Final	Huddersfield Town	0–1	Nottingham Forest	Wembley
16:30 BST	Toffolo (yellow card) 73'	Report	Colwill 43' (o.g.); Zinckernagel (yellow card) 55'	Stadium: Wembley Stadium; Attendance: 80,019; Referee: Jonathan Moss

=== FA Cup ===
Huddersfield were drawn away to Burnley in the third round. They were then drawn to host Barnsley in the fourth round. They were then drawn away to Nottingham Forest in the fifth round, the first time since 2018 that the team qualified for the 5th round.

8 January 2022 Third round	Burnley	1–2	Huddersfield Town	Burnley
12:30 GMT	Rodriguez 28'	Report	Koroma 74'; Pearson 87'	Stadium: Turf Moor; Attendance: 7,654; Referee: Andre Marriner

5 February 2022 Fourth round	Huddersfield Town	1–0	Barnsley	Huddersfield
15:00 GMT	Holmes 19'; Koroma (yellow card) 40'; Turton (yellow card) 50'		Kitching (yellow card) 89'; Helik (yellow card) 90+2'	Stadium: John Smith's Stadium; Attendance: 16,607; Referee: Jeremy Simpson

7 March 2022 Fifth round	Nottingham Forest	2–1	Huddersfield Town	West Bridgford
19:30 GMT	Surridge 29'; Lowe (yellow card) 32'; Yates 37'		Lees 13'	Stadium: City Ground; Attendance: 27,417; Referee: Graham Scott
Note: Live on ITV4

=== EFL Cup ===
Huddersfield Town were drawn at away to Sheffield Wednesday in the first round and at home to Everton in the second round.

1 August 2021 First round	Sheffield Wednesday	0–0 (2–4 p)	Huddersfield Town	Owlerton
13:00 BST	Iorfa (yellow card) 27'; J. Hunt (yellow card) 82'	Report	Ward (yellow card) 52'; Hogg (yellow card) 81'; O'Brien (yellow card) 86'; Colwill (yellow card) 86'	Stadium: Hillsborough Stadium; Attendance: 12,860; Referee: Darren Bond
	Penalties
	Hutchinson (penalty scored); Adeniran (penalty scored); Luongo (penalty missed); Palmer (penalty missed)		(penalty scored) Rhodes; (penalty scored) Thomas; (penalty scored) Sinani; (penalty scored) O'Brien

24 August 2021 Second round	Huddersfield Town	1–2	Everton	Huddersfield
19:45 BST	Lees 45'; Thomas (yellow card) 60'; Sarr (yellow card) 81'		Iwobi 26'; Kean (red card) 59'; Townsend 79'; Gomes (yellow card) 90+5'	Stadium: John Smith's Stadium; Attendance: 10,459; Referee: Matthew Donohue

== Squad statistics ==
No.	Pos.	Name	League		FA Cup		EFL Cup		Play-Offs		Total		Discipline	
No.	Pos.	Name	Apps	Goals	Apps	Goals	Apps	Goals	Apps	Goals	Apps	Goals	Yellow card	Red card
2	DF	(Spain) Pipa	6+5	0	3	0	0	0	2+1	0	11+6	0	1	0
3	DF	(England) Harry Toffolo	40+2	6	0+1	0	2	0	3	0	45+3	6	4	0
4	DF	(England) Matty Pearson	37	3	3	1	2	0	0	0	42	4	3	0
5	MF	(Spain) Álex Vallejo	2+3	1	0	0	1	0	0	0	3+3	1	0	0
6	MF	(England) Jonathan Hogg	31	2	2	0	1	0	3	0	37	2	4	0
7	MF	(England) Tino Anjorin	0+7	1	0+1	0	0	0	0	0	0+8	1	0	0
8	MF	(England) Lewis O'Brien	43	3	0+2	0	1+1	0	3	0	47+3	3	8	0
9	FW	(Scotland) Jordan Rhodes	6+15	3	2+1	0	0+1	0	0+3	1	8+20	4	1	0
10	FW	(England) Josh Koroma	19+15	4	2	1	1+1	0	0	0	22+16	5	3	0
11	MF	(Jamaica) Rolando Aarons	0+1	0	0	0	0	0	0	0	0+1	0	0	0
14	DF	(England) Josh Ruffels	2+6	0	3	0	0	0	0	0	5+6	0	0	0
15	MF	(Scotland) Scott High	14+9	0	0	0	2	0	0	0	16+9	0	2	0
16	MF	(Wales) Sorba Thomas	42+1	3	2+1	0	1+1	0	1+2	0	46+5	3	11	0
18	GK	(England) Jamal Blackman	1	0	2	0	0	0	0	0	3	0	0	0
19	MF	(United States) Duane Holmes	26+11	5	2+1	1	2	0	2+1	0	32+13	6	8	0
20	DF	(England) Ollie Turton	25+15	0	0+1	0	1+1	0	1	0	27+17	0	5	0
21	GK	(England) Lee Nicholls	43	0	0	0	2	0	3	0	48	0	6	0
22	FW	(England) Fraizer Campbell	4+15	0	0	0	1	0	0	0	5+15	0	3	0
23	DF	(Senegal) Naby Sarr	14+4	3	3	0	1	0	2+1	0	20+5	3	4	0
24	MF	(Luxembourg) Danel Sinani	31+8	6	2+1	0	1+1	0	3	1	37+10	7	0	0
25	FW	(England) Danny Ward	37+3	14	0+3	0	1	0	3	0	41+6	14	2	0
26	DF	(England) Levi Colwill	26+3	2	0	0	1	0	2	0	29+3	2	6	0
29	DF	(England) Aaron Rowe	0+1	0	0	0	0	0	0	0	0+1	0	0	0
31	GK	(England) Ryan Schofield	2	0	1	0	0	0	0	0	3	0	0	0
32	DF	(England) Tom Lees	39+1	3	2+1	1	1	1	3	0	45+2	5	4	0
37	MF	(Jamaica) Jon Russell	15+2	2	2	0	0	0	2+1	0	19+3	2	2	0
42	GK	(Australia) Nicholas Bilokapic	0	0	0+1	0	0	0	0	0	0+1	0	0	0
48	MF	(Netherlands) Carel Eiting	1+4	0	2	0	0	0	0	0	3+4	0	1	0
—	—	Own goals	–	3	–	0	–	0	–	0	–	3	–	–
Players who left the club during the season:
7	FW	(Republic of Ireland) Mipo Odubeko	0+6	0	0	0	0	0	0	0	0+6	0	0	0

== Awards ==
=== Huddersfield Town Blue & White Player of the Month Award ===
Awarded monthly to the player that was chosen by members of the Blue & White Members (formerly Blue & White Foundation) voting on htafc.com

Month	Player	Votes
September	(Wales) Sorba Thomas	
October	(England) Tom Lees	
November	(England) Lee Nicholls	
December	(England) Lee Nicholls	
January	(England) Danny Ward	
February	(England) Lee Nicholls	
March	(England) Lee Nicholls	
Season	(England) Lee Nicholls	

=== EFL Awards ===
On 24 April 2022, Huddersfield goalkeeper Lee Nicholls was named in the EFL Championship Team of the Season at the EFL Awards.
