= Carlos Corberán =

Spanish footballer and coach (born 1983)

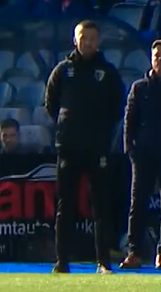
- Corberán as manager of Huddersfield Town in 2022

Personal information
- Full name: Carlos Corberán Vallet
- Date of birth: 7 April 1983 (age 43)
- Place of birth: Cheste, Spain
- Height: 6 ft 2 in (1.88 m)
- Position: Goalkeeper

Youth career
- Cheste
- Valencia

Senior career*
Years	Team	Apps	(Gls)
- Valencia B
- Burjassot
–2006	Ribarroja		

Managerial career
- 2016–2017: Doxa Katokopias
- 2017: Ermis Aradippou
- 2020–2022: Huddersfield Town
- 2022: Olympiacos
- 2022–2024: West Bromwich Albion
- 2024–2026: Valencia
- * Club domestic league appearances and goals

Carlos Corberán Vallet (born 7 April 1983) is a Spanish professional football coach and former goalkeeper. He last served as head coach of La Liga club Valencia.

Previously the head coach of Doxa Katokopias and Ermis Aradippou in the Cypriot First Division, Corberán was first team assistant coach and manager of the under-23s at Leeds United. He then managed at Huddersfield Town, Olympiacos and West Bromwich Albion before joining boyhood club Valencia in December 2024.

== Playing career ==
Born in Cheste, Valencian Community on 7 April 1983, Corberán represented hometown side Cheste and Valencia as a youth.

He began his senior career as a goalkeeper playing for Valencia B before moving to Burjassot and then Ribarroja. At the age of 23, in 2006 after playing no higher than Tercera División, he decided to retire to pursue his passion for coaching.

== Coaching career ==
=== Early career ===
After retiring, Corberán started working at Villarreal's C and B-teams, as a fitness coach. In 2011, after the appointment of Juan Carlos Garrido in the first team, he was named fitness coach of the main squad.

In February 2012, Corberán signed for Saudi Arabian team Al-Ittihad alongside head coach Raúl Caneda, having been recommended by Pep Guardiola. Whilst at the club, he was a fitness coach and helped get the club to the semi-finals of the AFC Champions League.

In July 2013, Corberán was appointed manager of Alcorcón's Juvenil A squad, but was relieved from his duties and replaced by José María Rico the following January. In 2014, he returned to Saudi Arabia and joined Al-Nassr, and was named as Caneda's assistant. They were runners-up in the Saudi Super Cup, and reached the group phase in the Champions League and were also finalists in the King's Cup.

=== Cyprus ===
On 29 November 2016, Corberán had his first senior managerial experience after being appointed in charge of Doxa Katokopias in the Cypriot First Division. The following 24 January, however, he was sacked.

Corberán was appointed the new head coach of Ermis Aradippou, also in the Cypriot top tier, on 30 January 2017, where he helped guide them to a seventh-place finish, before being replaced by Nicos Panayiotou.

=== Leeds United ===
On 21 June 2017, Corberán was announced as the new Leeds United under-23 manager, replacing the departed Jason Blunt.

After the appointment of new head coach Marcelo Bielsa in June 2018, Corberán was promoted to first team coach, as well as continuing his role as the head coach of the under-23s. In October 2018, Corberán was described as "very talented" by Bielsa, with Bielsa stating he values Corberán's opinion "more than his own".

Corberán's side won the 2018–19 Professional Development League North Division, they then became the national Professional Development League Champions by beating Birmingham City under-23 in the final.

In June 2019, it was reported that Corberán would be offered the head coach job at Spanish side Cultural Leonesa, but he decided to stay at Leeds to remain under Bielsa. A year later, Leeds earned promotion to the Premier League as EFL Championship winners.

=== Huddersfield Town ===
In July 2020, Corberán was offered the position of head coach at Huddersfield Town, which he accepted and his appointment was confirmed on 23 July. On his debut, on 5 September, the club lost 1–0 at home to Rochdale in the first round of the EFL Cup; the first league game a week later saw the same score against Norwich City, also at the Kirklees Stadium.

Corberán missed the opening game of the 2021–22 season due to a positive COVID-19 test. The 2021–22 season saw the Terriers finish in third position. After drawing the first leg of the play-off semi-finals 1–1 away from home, a 1–0 home victory saw them defeat Luton Town and set up a final with Nottingham Forest at Wembley. The match was decided with a Huddersfield own goal.

On 7 July 2022, Corberán resigned from his position as head coach.

=== Olympiacos ===
On 1 August 2022, Corberán was appointed head coach of Olympiacos. During the UEFA Europa League qualification, under his management, the team managed to qualify for the group stages, despite the fact that the qualification was decided on penalties on two occasions in a row. He was sacked after two consecutive defeats in the Europa League group stage, and a 2–1 defeat by Aris in Thessaloniki, with the team fifth in the Super League.

=== West Bromwich Albion ===
On 25 October 2022, Corberán returned to the EFL Championship, being appointed head coach of West Bromwich Albion on a 2 1/2-year deal. He joined a team that were second from bottom after 16 games. His debut four days later was a 2–0 home loss to Sheffield United. He won ten of the next twelve league games. On 7 February 2023, amid speculation of a return to Leeds following the sacking of Jesse Marsch, Corberán signed a contract extension, keeping him at the club until 2027. His team remained in contention for the play-offs until the final day, losing 3–2 at Swansea City to finish ninth.

=== Valencia ===
On 24 December 2024, Corberán signed a 3-year deal to become the head coach of his hometown and boyhood club, La Liga side Valencia. Taking over with the club in the relegation places, he oversaw an upturn in form and led them to an eventual 12th-place finish in La Liga.

During the first half of the 2025–26 season, Valencia endured a poor run of form under Corberán, including consecutive defeats to Oviedo, Girona, Villarreal, and heavy losses to Barcelona (6–0) and Real Madrid (4–0). The team improved in the second half of the season, finishing ninth. On 6 July 2026, Valencia extended Corberán's contract by 1 year until 2028. Later that year, on 13 September, the club announced that they had parted ways with Corberán.

== Managerial statistics ==
As of 11 September 2026

Managerial record by team and tenure
Team	Nat	From	To	Record								Ref
Team	Nat	From	To	G	W	D	L	GF	GA	GD	Win %	Ref
Doxa	(Cyprus)	29 November 2016	24 January 2017	8	1	2	5	4	10	−6	12.50	
Ermis	(Cyprus)	30 January 2017	31 May 2017	15	6	2	7	25	26	−1	40.00	
Huddersfield Town	(England)	23 July 2020	7 July 2022	102	38	28	36	123	129	−6	37.25	
Olympiacos	(Greece)	1 August 2022	18 September 2022	11	2	6	3	13	14	−1	18.18	
West Bromwich Albion	(England)	25 October 2022	24 December 2024	107	47	29	31	149	110	+39	43.93	
Valencia	(Spain)	24 December 2024	13 September 2026	72	28	18	26	91	101	−10	38.89	
Career totals				315	122	85	108	405	390	+15	38.73	—

== Honours ==
=== Manager ===
Leeds United U23

- Professional Development Northern League: 2018–19
- Professional Development League: 2018–19

Individual

- EFL Championship Manager of the Month: February 2022
