= 2022–23 AFC Wimbledon season =

AFC Wimbledon
2022–23 season
- Owner: The Dons Trust
- Chairman: Mick Buckley
- Manager: Johnnie Jackson
- Stadium: Plough Lane
- League Two: 21st
- FA Cup: Second round
- EFL Cup: First round
- EFL Trophy: Round of 16
- Top goalscorer: League: Josh Davison (9); All: Josh Davison (10)
Home colours	Away colours	Third colours

The 2022–23 season was the 21st season in the existence of AFC Wimbledon and the club's first season back in League Two since the 2015–16 season following their relegation from League One the prior season. In addition to the league, they also competed in the 2022–23 FA Cup, the 2022–23 EFL Cup and the 2022–23 EFL Trophy.

== Transfers ==
=== In ===
Date	Pos	Player	Transferred from	Fee	Ref
1 July 2022 (Note: The transfer was announced on 7 June, and would become official on July 1 once his Millwall contract expired)	CB	(Republic of Ireland) Alex Pearce	(England) Millwall	Free	
4 July 2022	RB	(Wales) Chris Gunter	(England) Charlton Athletic	Free	
18 July 2022	CF	(England) Josh Davison	(England) Charlton Athletic	Undisclosed	
24 August 2022	CM	(England) Harry Pell	(England) Accrington Stanley	Undisclosed	
11 September 2022	GK	(Finland) Will Jääskeläinen	(England) Crewe Alexandra	Free	
1 October 2022	RW	(England) Courtney Senior	(Wales) Newport County	Free	
12 January 2023	CF	(Iraq) Ali Al-Hamadi	(England) Wycombe Wanderers	Undisclosed	
31 January 2023	CB	(Grenada) Aaron Pierre	(England) Sutton United	Undisclosed	

=== Out ===
Date	Pos	Player	Transferred to	Fee	Ref
30 June 2022	RB	(England) Cheye Alexander	(England) Gillingham	Released	
30 June 2022	CF	(England) Corie Andrews	(England) Torquay United	Released	
30 June 2022	CB	(England) Darius Charles	Retired		
30 June 2022	CM	(England) Anthony Hartigan	(England) Mansfield Town	Rejected Contract	
30 June 2022	CB	(England) Ben Heneghan	(England) Sheffield Wednesday	Released	
30 June 2022	RW	(Albania) Egli Kaja	(England) Hampton & Richmond Borough	Released	
30 June 2022	CB	(Wales) Jack Madelin	Unattached	Released	
30 June 2022	LB	(England) Nesta Guinness-Walker	(England) Reading	Rejected Contract	
30 June 2022	MF	(England) Isaac Olaniyan	(England) Bognor Regis Town	Released	
30 June 2022	GK	(Algeria) Zaki Oualah	(England) Weymouth	Released	
30 June 2022	CF	(France) Derick Osei	(Scotland) Dundee	Released	
1 July 2022	FW	(England) Archie Stevens	(Scotland) Rangers	Undisclosed	
2 July 2022	FW	(England) Leon Chiwome	(England) Wolverhampton Wanderers	Undisclosed	
4 July 2022	CB	(Hungary) Dániel Csóka	(Hungary) Zalaegerszegi	Undisclosed	
15 July 2022	CM	(England) Jack Rudoni	(England) Huddersfield Town	Undisclosed	
24 August 2022	CM	(England) Luke McCormick	(England) Bristol Rovers	Undisclosed	
13 January 2023	GK	(Finland) Will Jääskeläinen	(England) Woking	Released	
27 January 2023	RW	(England) Ayoub Assal	(Qatar) Al-Wakrah	Undisclosed	
31 January 2023	RW	(England) Courtney Senior	(England) Barnet	Released	
1 February 2023	LB	(England) Paul Osew	(England) Northampton Town	Mutual Consent	

=== Loans in ===
Date	Pos	Player	Loaned from	On loan until	Ref
15 July 2022	CF	(England) Kyle Hudlin	(England) Huddersfield Town	4 January 2023 (Note: On 4 January, Hudlin was recalled to Huddersfield)	
18 July 2022	CM	(England) Paris Maghoma	(England) Brentford	5 January 2023 (Note: On 5 January, Maghoma was recalled to Brentford)	
29 July 2022	RW	(England) Nathan Young-Coombes	(England) Brentford	20 January 2023 (Note: On 20 January, Young-Coombes was recalled to Brentford)	
1 September 2022	CB	(England) Ryley Towler	(England) Bristol City	6 January 2023 (Note: On 6 January, Towler was recalled to Bristol City)	
6 January 2023	RW	(Wales) Sam Pearson	(England) Bristol City	End of Season	
12 January 2023	CM	(England) Armani Little	(England) Forest Green Rovers	End of Season	
24 January 2023	CF	(The Gambia) Saikou Janneh	(England) Cambridge United	End of Season	
31 January 2023	RW	(England) Diallang Jaiyesimi	(England) Charlton Athletic	End of Season	
1 February 2023	AM	(England) Kasey McAteer	(England) Leicester City	End of Season	

=== Loans out ===
Date	Pos	Player	Loaned to	On loan until	Ref
30 July 2022	CF	(England) Zach Robinson	(Scotland) Dundee	6 January 2023 (Note: On 6 January, Robinson was recalled from his loan at Dundee)	
19 August 2022	CF	(England) Aaron Cosgrave	(England) Southend United	End of Season	
27 August 2022	RB	(England) Ben Mason	(England) Basingstoke Town	31 January 2023	
11 September 2022	AM	(England) Marcel Campbell	(England) South Park	1 January 2023	
11 September 2022	CM	(England) Kwaku Frimpong	(England) Dartford	11 October 2022	
2 January 2023	CM	(England) Kwaku Frimpong	(England) Potters Bar Town	2 February 2023	
4 January 2023	CF	(England) Quaine Bartley	(England) Wingate & Finchley	4 February 2023	
20 January 2023	CM	(England) Alfie Bendle	(England) Eastbourne Borough	End of Season	
1 February 2023	CF	(England) Zach Robinson	(Scotland) Dundee	End of Season	

== Pre-season and friendlies ==
On 31 May, AFC Wimbledon announced their first four pre-season friendlies. A fifth friendly match was added, against Farnborough.

Win Draw Loss Fixtures

2 July 2022 Friendly	Bedford Town	0–2	AFC Wimbledon	Cardington
13:00 BST		Report	McCormick (?); Robinson (?)	Stadium: The New Eyrie

9 July 2022 Friendly	Eastbourne Borough	1–0	AFC Wimbledon	Langney
15:00 BST	Whelpdale 83'	Report		Stadium: Priory Lane

12 July 2022 Friendly	Farnborough	0–2	AFC Wimbledon	Farnborough
19:15 BST		Report	Assal (?)	Stadium: Easy As HGV Stadium

16 July 2022 Friendly	AFC Wimbledon	0–3	Ipswich Town	Wimbledon
14:30 BST		Report	Morsy 12', 57'; John-Jules 48'	Stadium: Plough Lane

19 July 2022 Friendly	AFC Wimbledon	0–2	Reading	Wimbledon
19:45 BST		Report	Méïté 35'; Hendrick 75'	Stadium: Plough Lane

23 July 2022 Friendly	AFC Wimbledon	0–0	Oxford United	Wimbledon
15:00 BST		Report		Stadium: Cherry Red Records Stadium

== Competitions ==
=== Overall record ===
Competition	First match	Last match	Starting round	Record							
Competition	First match	Last match	Starting round	Pld	W	D	L	GF	GA	GD	Win %
League Two	August 2022	May 2023	Matchday 1	46	11	15	20	48	60	−12	23.91
FA Cup	November 2022	November 2022	First round	3	1	1	1	4	4	+0	33.33
EFL Cup	August 2022	August 2022	First round	1	0	0	1	0	2	−2	0.00
EFL Trophy	August 2022	December 2022	Group stage	5	3	2	0	10	7	+3	60.00
Total				55	15	18	22	62	73	−11	27.27

Last updated: 25 January 2024
Source: [ Soccerway]

=== League Two ===
==== League table ====
Pos	Team	Pld	W	D	L	GF	GA	GD	Pts	Promotion, qualification or relegation
18	Doncaster Rovers	46	16	7	23	46	65	−19	55	
19	Harrogate Town	46	12	16	18	59	68	−9	52	
20	Colchester United	46	12	13	21	44	51	−7	49	
21	AFC Wimbledon	46	11	15	20	48	60	−12	48	
22	Crawley Town	46	11	13	22	48	71	−23	46	
23	Hartlepool United (R)	46	9	16	21	52	78	−26	43	Relegation to National League
24	Rochdale (R)	46	9	11	26	46	70	−24	38	Relegation to National League

Source: EFL Official Website
Rules for classification: 1) Points; 2) Goal difference; 3) Number of goals scored; 4) Head-to-head results; 5) Wins; 6) Away goals; 7) Penalty points (sec 9.5); 8) 12-point sending off offences
(R) Relegated

==== Results summary ====
Overall								Home						Away					
Pld	W	D	L	GF	GA	GD	Pts	W	D	L	GF	GA	GD	W	D	L	GF	GA	GD
46	11	15	20	48	60	−12	48	7	7	9	26	30	−4	4	8	11	22	30	−8

Last updated: 8 May 2023.
Source: [ Soccerway]

==== Results by round ====
Round	1	2	3	4	5	6	7	8	9	10	11	12	13	14	15	16	17	18	19	20	21	22	23	24	25	26	27	28	29	30	31	32	33	34	35	36	37	38	39	40	41	42	43	44	45	46
Ground	H	A	H	A	A	H	A	H	A	A	H	A	H	A	H	H	H	A	A	H	A	H	A	A	A	H	H	A	H	A	H	A	H	H	A	A	H	A	H	H	A	H	A	H	H	A
Result	W	D	D	L	W	L	L	L	L	D	W	L	L	W	D	W	W	D	W	W	D	D	W	L	D	D	W	L	D	D	D	L	L	L	L	D	L	L	W	L	D	L	L	L	D	L
Position	3	6	8	12	10	12	15	15	17	16	15	17	17	17	17	15	15	15	13	11	12	12	11	14	13	13	11	13	14	13	13	15	15	15	15	16	16	18	16	16	18	17	19	20	21	21

Updated to match(es) played on 8 May 2023. Source: [ Soccerway]
A = Away; H = Home; W = Win; D = Draw; L = Loss; P = Postponed

==== Matches ====
Win Draw Loss Fixtures

On 23 June, the league fixtures were announced.

30 July 2022 1	AFC Wimbledon	2–0	Gillingham	Wimbledon
15:00 BST	Nightingale (yellow card) 9'; Chislett 15'; Marsh (yellow card) 47'; Maghoma (yellow card) 63'; Currie 71'	Report	Ehmer (yellow card) 35'; Lee (yellow card) 47'; Reeves (yellow card) 57'; Wright (yellow card) 67'; Kashket (yellow card) 81'	Stadium: Cherry Red Records Stadium; Attendance: 7,752; Referee: Simon Mather

6 August 2022 2	Hartlepool United	0–0	AFC Wimbledon	Hartlepool
15:00 BST	Cooke (yellow card) 78'; Featherstone (yellow card) 89'; Crawford (yellow card) 90+1'	Report		Stadium: Suit Direct Stadium; Attendance: 4,543; Referee: Bobby Madden

13 August 2022 3	AFC Wimbledon	2–2	Doncaster Rovers	Wimbledon
15:00 BST	Maghoma (yellow card) 69'; Young-Coombes 76', 84'; Davison (yellow card) 86'	Report	Clayton (yellow card) 2'; Tomlin (yellow card) 39'; Anderson (yellow card) 56'; Williams (yellow card) 66', (goal) 90+4'; Rowe 86'	Stadium: The Cherry Red Records Stadium; Attendance: 6,847; Referee: Ollie Yates

16 August 2022 4	Mansfield Town	5–2	AFC Wimbledon	Mansfield
19:45 BST	Oates 32' (pen.); Lapslie 40'; Quinn (yellow card) 45+1'; McLaughlin (yellow card) 45+3'; Maris 56'; Harbottle 70'; Swan 87'	Report	Davison 4', 16'; Marsh (yellow card) 28'; Currie (yellow card) 31'; Gunter (red card) 45'; Brown (yellow card) 45+4'; Ogundere (yellow card) 82'	Stadium: One Call Stadium; Attendance: 5,709; Referee: Ben Speedie

20 August 2022 5	Crawley Town	0–2	AFC Wimbledon	Crawley
15:00 BST	Omole (yellow card) 25'; Craig (yellow card) 45' (yellow-red card) 55'	Report	Young-Coombes 15'; Davison (yellow card) 37'; Chislett 45+1'; Brown (yellow card) 72'	Stadium: The People's Pension Stadium; Attendance: 3,890; Referee: James Oldham

27 August 2022 6	AFC Wimbledon	0–1	Barrow	Wimbledon
15:00 BST	Marsh (yellow card) 30'; Brown (yellow card) 54'	Report	Gordon 10', (yellow card) 41'; Foley (yellow card) 31'	Stadium: The Cherry Red Records Stadium; Attendance: 7,048; Referee: John Busby

3 September 2022 7	Stockport County	1–0	AFC Wimbledon	Edgeley
15:00 BST	Horsfall 11', (yellow card) 53'	Report	Pell (yellow card) 4'	Stadium: Edgeley Park; Attendance: 8,073; Referee: Sunny Gill

10 September 2022	AFC Wimbledon	Postponed	Leyton Orient	Wimbledon
15:00 BST				Stadium: The Cherry Red Records Stadium
Note: Fixture was postponed as a mark of respect following the passing of Queen Elizabeth II.

13 September 2022 8	AFC Wimbledon	0–2	Northampton Town	Wimbledon
19:45 BST	Maghoma (yellow card) 65'; Assal (yellow card) 84'; Pearce (yellow card) 90+2'	Report	Guthrie 27'; Sowerby (yellow card) 43'; Towler 69' (o.g.)	Stadium: The Cherry Red Records Stadium; Attendance: 6,618; Referee: Charles Breakspear

17 September 2022 9	Carlisle United	2–1	AFC Wimbledon	Carlisle
15:00 BST	Mellish (yellow card) 35'; Guy 45'; Dennis 81'; Armer (yellow card) 90+3'	Report	Towler (yellow card) 30'; Assal 59', (yellow card) 90+3'; Brown (yellow card) 67'; Pell (yellow card) 89'	Stadium: Brunton Park; Attendance: 5,038; Referee: Andy Haines

24 September 2022 10	Bradford City	2–2	AFC Wimbledon	Bradford
15:00 BST	Banks 4'; Pereira (yellow card) 45'; Hendrie (yellow card) 70'; Oliver 90+5'	Report	Nightingale (yellow card) 28'; Maghoma (yellow card) 45+2'; Pell 58', (yellow card) 84'; Chislett 76'	Stadium: University of Bradford Stadium; Attendance: 17,186; Referee: Darren Drysdale

1 October 2022 11	AFC Wimbledon	2–1	Colchester United	Wimbledon
15:00 BST	Davison 47' 66' (pen.) (yellow card) 90+1'; Assal (yellow card) 72'; Ogundere (yellow card) 87'; Kalambayi (yellow card) 90+5'; Chislett (yellow card) 90+6'	Report	Appiah 18'; Tchamadeu (yellow card) 31'; Hannant (yellow card) 40'; Skuse (yellow card) 90+1'	Stadium: The Cherry Red Records Stadium; Attendance: 7,328; Referee: Tom Reeves

8 October 2022 12	Walsall	3–1	AFC Wimbledon	Bescot
15:00 BST	Hutchinson 5'; Allen (yellow card) 25'; Daniels (yellow card) 28'; Johnson 50'; White (yellow card) 90+2'; Knowles 90+3'	Report	Towler 21' (yellow card) 89'; Kalambayi (yellow card) 78'	Stadium: Poundland Bescot Stadium; Attendance: 4,905; Referee: Adam Herczeg

15 October 2022 13	AFC Wimbledon	0–1	Sutton United	Wimbledon
15:00 BST	Pell (yellow card) 13'; Maghoma (yellow card) 71'	Report	Eastmond 30'; Bugiel (yellow card) 55'; Randall (yellow card) 77'; Milsom (yellow card) 84'	Stadium: The Cherry Red Records Stadium; Attendance: 8,568; Referee: Carl Brook

22 October 2022 14	Rochdale	1–2	AFC Wimbledon	Spotland
15:00 BST	Sinclair 66'; Ebanks-Landell (yellow card) 79'	Report	Towler (yellow card) 20'; Assal 39' (yellow card) 86'; Gunter (yellow card) 59'; Davison 64'; Woodyard (yellow card) 90+3'	Stadium: Spotland; Attendance: 2,568; Referee: Marc Edwards

25 October 2022 15	AFC Wimbledon	1–1	Crewe Alexandra	Wimbledon
19:45 BST	Assal 45+1'; Chislett (yellow card) 53'; Davison (penalty missed) 75'	Report	Thomas (yellow card) 24'; Mellor (yellow card) 39'; Williams (yellow card) 53'; Adebisi 62'; Tabiner (yellow card) 70'; Offord (yellow card) 88'	Stadium: The Cherry Red Records Stadium; Attendance: 6,984; Referee: Lee Swabey

29 October 2022 16	AFC Wimbledon	3–2	Harrogate Town	Wimbledon
15:00 BST	Kalambayi 39'; Currie (yellow card) 72'; Hudlin (yellow card) 75'; Senior 84'; Davison 88'	Report	Daly 47'; Pattison 65'	Stadium: The Cherry Red Records Stadium; Attendance: 7,620; Referee: Paul Howard

8 November 2022 17	AFC Wimbledon	2–0	Leyton Orient	Wimbledon
19:45 GMT	Assal 19' (yellow card) 72'; Towler (yellow card) 32'; Pell 35'; Maghoma (yellow card) 44'; Marsh (yellow card) 73'	Report	James (yellow card) 20'; Drinan (yellow card) 41'; Smyth (yellow card) 45+3'; Beckles (yellow card) 90+1'; Moncur (yellow card) 90+9'	Stadium: The Cherry Red Records Stadium; Attendance: 7,994; Referee: Robert Lewis

12 November 2022 18	Salford City	0–0	AFC Wimbledon	Salford
15:00 GMT	Vassell (yellow card) 40'; Bolton (yellow card) 78'; Watt (yellow card) 90+3'	Report	Kalambayi (yellow card) 40'	Stadium: Moor Lane; Attendance: 2,591; Referee: Ross Joyce

19 November 2022 19	Tranmere Rovers	0–2	AFC Wimbledon	Birkenhead
15:00 GMT	Hawkes (yellow card) 11'; Simeu (red card) 30'; Davies (yellow card) 90+2'	Report	Chislett 8' (yellow card) 11'; Assal 82'	Stadium: Prenton Park; Attendance: 6,010; Referee: Thomas Kirk

3 December 2022 20	AFC Wimbledon	1–0	Grimsby Town	Wimbledon
12:30 GMT	Biler (yellow card) 34'; Kalambayi (yellow card) 49'; Chislett 60'; Pell (yellow card) 66'	Report	Simmonds (yellow card) 78'	Stadium: The Cherry Red Records Stadium; Attendance: 7,962; Referee: Darren Handley

10 December 2022 21	Swindon Town	0–0	AFC Wimbledon	Swindon
15:00 GMT	Blake-Tracy (yellow card) 29'; Lavinier (yellow card) 89'	Report	Pell (yellow card) 63'; Woodyard (yellow card) 71'; Maghoma (yellow card) 81'; Davison (yellow card) 90'	Stadium: County Ground; Attendance: 8,430; Referee: Sam Allison

17 December 2022	AFC Wimbledon	Postponed	Stevenage	Wimbledon
15:00 GMT				Stadium: The Cherry Red Records Stadium
Note: Fixture was postponed due to a frozen pitch.

26 December 2022 22	AFC Wimbledon	1–1	Newport County	Wimbledon
15:00 GMT	Chislett 58'; Hudlin (red card) 66'	Report	Zanzala (yellow card) 9' (goal) 70' (pen.); Demetriou (yellow card) 66'; Lewis (yellow card) 68'; Moriah-Welsh (yellow card) 74'	Stadium: The Cherry Red Records Stadium; Attendance: 7,784; Referee: Paul Howard

29 December 2022 23	Colchester United	1–2	AFC Wimbledon	Colchester
19:45 GMT	Chambers (yellow card) 11'; Tovide (yellow card) 36'; Akinde (yellow card) 41' (goal) 51' (pen.)	Report	Currie (yellow card) 23'; Tzanev (yellow card) 51'; Davison 67'; Chislett 89'	Stadium: Colchester Community Stadium; Attendance: 4,025; Referee: Lee Swabey

1 January 2023 24	Sutton United	2–1	AFC Wimbledon	Sutton
15:00 GMT	Randall 13'; Bugiel (yellow card) 62' (goal) 69'	Report	Woodyard (yellow card) 9'; Davison 40'	Stadium: VBS Community Stadium; Attendance: 5,049; Referee: Will Fannie

7 January 2023 25	Crewe Alexandra	0–0	AFC Wimbledon	Crewe
15:00 GMT	Brook (yellow card) 72'	Report	Brown (yellow card) 73'; Marsh (yellow card) 84'	Stadium: Mornflake Stadium; Attendance: 4,379; Referee: Christopher Pollard

14 January 2023 26	AFC Wimbledon	0–0	Bradford City	Wimbledon
15:00 GMT		Report	Walker (yellow card) 44' (yellow-red card) 60'; Halliday (yellow card) 71'; Crichlow (yellow card) 80'	Stadium: The Cherry Red Records Stadium; Attendance: 8,383; Referee: Ben Toner

21 January 2023	Newport County	Postponed	AFC Wimbledon	Newport
15:00 GMT				Stadium: Rodney Parade
Note: Fixture was postponed due to a frozen pitch.

24 January 2023	AFC Wimbledon	Postponed	Walsall	Wimbledon
15:00 GMT				Stadium: The Cherry Red Records Stadium
Note: Fixture was postponed due to a frozen pitch.

28 January 2023 27	AFC Wimbledon	1–0	Stockport County	Wimbledon
15:00 GMT	Pell (yellow card) 10', (goal) 49'; Woodyard (yellow card) 63'; Little (yellow card) 71'; Chislett (yellow card) 76'; Biler (yellow card) 87'	Report	Wright (yellow card) 16'; Byrne (yellow card) 75'	Stadium: The Cherry Red Records Stadium; Attendance: 8,511; Referee: James Oldham

4 February 2023 28	Leyton Orient	1–0	AFC Wimbledon	Leyton
15:00 GMT	Sweeney (yellow card) 36'; Moncur 64'; Sadlier (yellow card) 79'; El Mizouni (yellow card) 90+4'	Report	Kalambayi (yellow card) 21'	Stadium: Brisbane Road; Attendance: 8,639; Referee: Martin Woods

11 February 2023 29	AFC Wimbledon	0–0	Carlisle United	Wimbledon
15:00 GMT	Kalambayi (yellow card) 45+4'	Report	Moxon (yellow card) 20'; Huntington (yellow card) 45+4'	Stadium: The Cherry Red Records Stadium; Attendance: 7,876; Referee: Darren Handley

14 February 2023 30	Northampton Town	0–0	AFC Wimbledon	Northampton
19:45 GMT	Guthrie (yellow card) 90+3'	Report	Woodyard (yellow card) 65'; Gunter (yellow card) 76'; Little (yellow card) 88'; Kalambayi (yellow card) 90+5'	Stadium: Sixfields Stadium; Attendance: 5,041; Referee: Carl Brook

18 February 2023 31	AFC Wimbledon	2–2	Hartlepool United	Wimbledon
15:00 GMT	Pearce (yellow card) 29'; Al-Hamadi 31', (yellow card) 79'; Jaiyesimi 53'; Davison (yellow card) 89'	Report	Kemp 71', 90+6', (yellow card) 90+7'	Stadium: The Cherry Red Records Stadium; Attendance: 7,495; Referee: Craig Hicks

25 February 2023 32	Gillingham	2–1	AFC Wimbledon	Gillingham
15:00 GMT	Masterson (yellow card) 6'; Ehmer 58'; Alexander 66'	Report	Woodyard (yellow card) 45+5'; Al-Hamadi 52'; Pell (yellow card) 62'; Gunter (yellow card) 65'; McAteer (yellow card) 75'; Marsh (yellow card) 90+4'	Stadium: MEMS Priestfield Stadium; Attendance: 7,453; Referee: Neil Hair

28 February 2023 33	AFC Wimbledon	2–3	Stevenage	Wimbledon
19:45 GMT	Al-Hamadi 39', 74'; Marsh (yellow card) 53'; Kalambayi (yellow card) 60'	Report	Clark (yellow card) 43'; Piergianni 55'; Sweeney (yellow card) 60'; McAteer 61' (o.g.); Gilbey (yellow card) 70'; Roberts (yellow card) 80'; Norris 83'	Stadium: Cherry Red Records Stadium; Attendance: 6,936; Referee: Jeremy Simpson

5 March 2023 34	AFC Wimbledon	1–3	Mansfield Town	Wimbledon
15:00 GMT	Al-Hamadi 25'; McAteer (yellow card) 57'	Report	Clarke (yellow card) 5'; Harbottle 30', (yellow card) 44'; Wallace (yellow card) 32'; Quinn (yellow card) 51'; Johnson 66'; Keillor-Dunn 77'	Stadium: Cherry Red Records Stadium; Attendance: 7,939; Referee: Ollie Yates

11 March 2023 35	Doncaster Rovers	2–1	AFC Wimbledon	Doncaster
15:00 GMT	Biggins 27'; Miller 32'; Seaman (yellow card) 34'; Nelson (yellow card) 90+6'	Report	Davison 18'	Stadium: The Eco-Power Stadium; Attendance: 5,998; Referee: Matthew Corlett

14 March 2023 36	Newport County	1–1	AFC Wimbledon	Newport
19:45 GMT	Farquharson (yellow card) 18'; Norman (yellow card) 61'; Charsley 69'; Lewis (yellow card) 74'	Report	Al-Hamadi 5'; Currie (yellow card) 63'; McAteer (yellow card) 70'; Woodyard (yellow card) 74'	Stadium: Rodney Parade; Attendance: 4,051 (315 away); Referee: Tom Reeves

18 March 2023 37	AFC Wimbledon	0–1	Crawley Town	Wimbledon
15:00 GMT	Pierre (yellow card) 39'; Little (yellow card) 41'; Nightingale (yellow card) 55'	Report	Nadesan 5', (yellow card) 19'; Roles (yellow card) 67'; Oteh (yellow card) 72'; Johnson (yellow card) 88'	Stadium: Cherry Red Records Stadium; Attendance: 7,300 (365 away); Referee: Carl Boyeson

25 March 2023 38	Barrow	2–1	AFC Wimbledon	Barrow-in-Furness
15:00 GMT	Neal (yellow card) 58'; Canavan 61'; Whitfield (yellow card) 62'; Gordon 74'	Report	Jenkins 5'; Ogundere (yellow card) 24'; Currie (yellow card) 55'; Little (yellow card) 90+7'	Stadium: So Legal Stadium; Attendance: 3,794; Referee: Sam Allison

28 March 2023 39	AFC Wimbledon	2–0	Walsall	Wimbledon
19:45 GMT	Nightingale 59'; Al-Hamadi 74', (yellow card) 75'	Report	White (yellow card) 36'; Wilkinson (yellow card) 39'; Hutchinson (yellow card) 43'; Williams (yellow card) 57'	Stadium: Cherry Red Records Stadium; Attendance: 6,809; Referee: Ben Speedie

1 April 2023 40	AFC Wimbledon	0–1	Rochdale	Wimbledon
15:00 BST	Little (yellow card) 82'; Brown (yellow card) 85'	Report	Lloyd 64'; Mellor (yellow card) 79'; Odoh (yellow card) 85'	Stadium: Cherry Red Records Stadium; Attendance: 7,380 (261 away); Referee: Alan Young

7 April 2023 41	Harrogate Town	2–2	AFC Wimbledon	Harrogate
15:00 BST	Foulds (yellow card) 41'; Falkingham (yellow card) 77'; Armstrong 89'; Sutton 90+7'	Report	Nightingale (yellow card) 25'; Chislett 32', 57'; Ogundere (yellow card) 75'; Al-Hamadi (yellow card) 90+5'	Stadium: The EnviroVent Stadium; Attendance: 2,891 (600 away); Referee: Scott Jackson

10 April 2023 42	AFC Wimbledon	2–3	Salford City	Wimbledon
15:00 BST	McAteer 7', (yellow card) 90+1'; Little (yellow card) 45+2'; Pearson (yellow card) 45+4'; Al-Hamadi 58'	Report	Galbraith (yellow card) 45+4'; McAleny 55'; Watt (yellow card) 79'; Hendry 90+5', 90+6', (yellow card) 90+6'	Stadium: Plough Lane; Attendance: 7,239; Referee: Bobby Madley

15 April 2023 43	Stevenage	2–1	AFC Wimbledon	Stevenage
15:00 BST	Roberts 4'; Reid 61'; Bostwick (yellow card) 90'; Rose (yellow card) 90+4'; Steve Evans (yellow card) off pitch'	Report	Al-Hamadi 11'; Nightingale (yellow card) 82'	Stadium: The Lamex Stadium; Attendance: 4,062 (694 away); Referee: James Bell

22 April 2023 44	AFC Wimbledon	1–5	Swindon Town	Wimbledon
15:00 BST	Pierre 8', (yellow card) 67', (red card) 90+1'; Jaiyesimi (yellow card) 24'; Chislett (yellow card) 59'; Marsh (yellow card) 82'	Report	Jephcott 16' (pen.), 32'; Wakeling 18'; Hutton (yellow card) 28'; Lavinier (yellow card) 49'; Williams (yellow card) 55'; Khan (yellow card) 59'; Clayton 61'; Darcy 90+2' (pen.)	Stadium: Cherry Red Records Stadium; Attendance: 8,421 (1,191 away); Referee: Scott Simpson

29 April 2023 45	AFC Wimbledon	1–1	Tranmere Rovers	Wimbledon
15:00 BST	Al-Hamadi 68'	Report	Taylor 79'	Stadium: Cherry Red Records Stadium; Attendance: 8,106 (533 away); Referee: Martin Woods

8 May 2023 46	Grimsby Town	1–0	AFC Wimbledon	Wimbledon
12:30 BST	Ogundere 7' (o.g.); Glennon (yellow card) 38'	Report	Ogundere (yellow card) 42'; Davison (yellow card) 34'; Nightingale (yellow card) 90+3'	Stadium: Cherry Red Records Stadium; Attendance: 6,733; Referee: David Rock

=== FA Cup ===
AFC Wimbledon were drawn away to Weymouth in the first round.

Win Draw Loss Fixtures

5 November 2022 First Round	Weymouth	1–1	AFC Wimbledon	Weymouth
15:00 BST	Rose 70'; Kyprianou (yellow card) 80'; Carlyle (yellow card) 88'	Report	Assal 5'; Kalambayi (yellow card) 53'; Gunter (yellow card) 90+2'	Stadium: Bob Lucas Stadium; Attendance: 2,934; Referee: Sam Allison

15 November 2022 First Round Replay	AFC Wimbledon	3–1	Weymouth	Wimbledon
19:45 GMT	Assal 48' (yellow card) 51'; Ogundere (yellow card) 56'; Chislett 61' 64'	Report	McBurnie (yellow card) 51'; Ash 78'	Stadium: The Cherry Red Records Stadium; Attendance: 3,672; Referee: Declan Bourne

26 November 2022 Second Round	AFC Wimbledon	0–2	Chesterfield	Wimbledon
15:00 GMT	Chislett (yellow card) 36'; Ogundere (yellow card) 44'; Kalambayi (yellow card) 53'; Senior (yellow card) 84'	Report	Dobra 44'; King 76'	Stadium: The Cherry Red Records Stadium; Attendance: 4,176; Referee: David Rock

=== EFL Cup ===
Win Draw Loss Fixtures

Wimbledon were drawn at home to Gillingham in the first round.

9 August 2022 First round	AFC Wimbledon	0–2	Gillingham	Wimbledon
19:45 BST	Assal (yellow card) 62'	Report	Ehmer (yellow card) 43'; Reeves (yellow card) 69'; Green (yellow card) 81', (goal) 90+2'; Mandron 90'	Stadium: The Cherry Red Records Stadium; Attendance: 3,008; Referee: Craig Hicks

=== EFL Trophy ===
On 20 June, the initial Group stage draw was made, grouping AFC Wimbleon with Crawley Town and Portsmouth. Three days later, Aston Villa U21s joined Southern Group B. In the third round, the Dons were drawn away to Plymouth Argyle.

Pos	Div	Team	Pld	W	PW	PL	L	GF	GA	GD	Pts	Qualification
1	L2	AFC Wimbledon	3	2	0	1	0	6	4	+2	7	Advance to Round 2
2	L1	Portsmouth	3	1	1	1	0	8	3	+5	6	Advance to Round 2
3	L2	Crawley Town	3	1	1	0	1	9	7	+2	5	
4	ACA	Aston Villa U21	3	0	0	0	3	3	12	−9	0	

Source: EFL.com

Win Draw Loss Fixtures

30 August 2022 Group stage	AFC Wimbledon	2–1	Aston Villa U21s	Wimbledon
19:00 BST	Kalambayi 12', (yellow card) 73'; Young-Coombes (yellow card) 42'; Davison 52'	Report	Jay-Hart 29'; Lindley (yellow card) 52'; Ealing (yellow card) 53'	Stadium: The Cherry Red Records Stadium; Attendance: 1,088; Referee: Will Finnie

20 September 2022 Group stage	AFC Wimbledon	3–2	Crawley Town	Wimbledon
19:45 BST	Bartley (yellow card) 26'; Hudlin 29' (pen.); Assal 75'; Frimpong 78'	Report	Ogungbo (red card) 28'; Marshall (yellow card) 40'; Powell 59', (yellow card) 71'; Frimpong 90+6' (o.g.)	Stadium: The Cherry Red Records Stadium; Attendance: 903; Referee: Sam Purkiss

1 November 2022 Group stage	Portsmouth	1–1 (3–1 p)	AFC Wimbledon	Portsmouth
19:45 BST	Curtis 15'; Hume (yellow card) 75'	Report	Biler (yellow card) 14'; Bendle (yellow card) 49'; Assal 50'	Stadium: Fratton Park; Attendance: 2,545; Referee: Craig Hicks
	Penalties
	Koroma (penalty scored); Hackett-Fairchild (penalty scored); Scarlett (penalty scored)		Hudlin (penalty scored); Frimpong (penalty missed); Senior (penalty missed); Sasu (penalty missed)

22 November 2022 Round of 32	AFC Wimbledon	1–0	Sutton United	Wimbledon
19:45 BST	Hudlin 17', (yellow card) 61'; Biler (yellow card) 87'; Broome (yellow card) 90+6'	Report	Bugiel (yellow card) 56'; John (yellow card) 90+6'	Stadium: The Cherry Red Records Stadium; Attendance: 1,854; Referee: Sam Purkiss

13 December 2022 Third round	Plymouth Argyle	Postponed	AFC Wimbledon	Plymouth
19:00 GMT				Stadium: Home Park
Note: Fixture was postponed due to a frozen pitch.

21 December 2022 Third round	Plymouth Argyle	3–3 (4–3 p)	AFC Wimbledon	Plymouth
19:00 GMT	Cosgrove 61', 72', 76', (yellow card) 86'; Halls (yellow card) 78'; Lonwijk (yellow card) 90+3'	Report	Hudlin 10', 17'; Assal 45+1'; Woodyard (yellow card) 87'	Stadium: Home Park; Attendance: 1,747; Referee: Sam Barrott
	Penalties
	Hardie (penalty scored); Cosgrove (penalty scored); Houghton (penalty scored); Whittaker (penalty scored); Mumba (penalty scored)		Hudlin (penalty scored); Towler (penalty scored); Assal (penalty missed); Fisher (penalty missed); Chislett (penalty scored)
