= Dylan Adjei-Hersey =

British football player

Personal information
- Full name: Dylan Francis Adjei-Hersey
- Date of birth: 6 September 2002 (age 24)
- Place of birth: Carshalton, England
- Position: Midfielder

Team information
- Current team: Potters Bar Town

Youth career
- –2021: AFC Wimbledon

Senior career*
| Years | Team | Apps | (Gls) |
| 2021–2023 | AFC Wimbledon | 3 | (0) |
| 2021–2022 | → Merstham (loan) | 35 | (5) |
| 2022 | → Eastbourne Borough (loan) | 3 | (0) |
| 2023 | → Hungerford Town (loan) | 10 | (1) |
| 2023–2025 | Enfield Town | 51 | (0) |
| 2025 | → Potters Bar Town (loan) | 11 | (1) |
| 2025– | Potters Bar Town | 32 | (3) |
- * Club domestic league appearances and goals as of 17:22, 5 March 2026 (UTC) ‡ National team caps and goals as of 00:15, 8 August 2022 (UTC)

Dylan Francis Adjei-Hersey (born 6 September 2002) is an English professional footballer who plays as a winger for Potters Bar Town.

== Career ==
Adjei-Hersey made his professional debut for Wimbledon as a last-minute substitute in a 1–1 draw at Fleetwood Town on 23 April 2022. He then made his first professional start in the final game of the 2021–22 EFL League One season at home against Accrington Stanley, a 4–3 defeat that confirmed Wimbledon's relegation.

The next season, Adjei-Hersey was on the bench twice, first against Gillingham on 30 July 2022 and then against Gillingham in the EFL Cup.

In January 2023, Adjei-Hersey joined Hungerford Town on loan. He was released by Wimbledon at the end of the 2022–23 season.

In August 2023, Adjei-Hersey signed for Isthmian League Premier Division club Enfield Town.

In February 2025 Adjei-Hersey went on loan to Isthmian Premier League side Potters Bar Town. In July 2025 at the end of his contract at Enfield he made a permanent move to Potters Bar Town.

== Career statistics ==
As of match played 28 February 2026

Appearances and goals by club, season and competition
| Club | Season | League | | | FA Cup | | League Cup | | Other | | Total | |
| Club | Season | Division | Apps | Goals | Apps | Goals | Apps | Goals | Apps | Goals | Apps | Goals |
|---|---|---|---|---|---|---|---|---|---|---|---|---|
| AFC Wimbledon | 2021–22 | League One | 2 | 0 | 0 | 0 | 0 | 0 | 0 | 0 | 2 | 0 |
| AFC Wimbledon | 2022–23 | League Two | 1 | 0 | 0 | 0 | 0 | 0 | 0 | 0 | 1 | 0 |
| AFC Wimbledon | Total | | 3 | 0 | 0 | 0 | 0 | 0 | 0 | 0 | 3 | 0 |
| Merstham (loan) | 2021–22 | Isthmian League Premier Division | 35 | 5 | 3 | 1 | 0 | 0 | 3 (Note: One appearance in FA Trophy, one appearance in Surrey Senior Cup, one appearance in Velocity Cup) | 0 | 41 | 6 |
| Eastbourne Borough (loan) | 2022–23 | National League South | 3 | 0 | 0 | 0 | 0 | 0 | 0 | 0 | 3 | 0 |
| Hungerford Town (loan) | 2022–23 | National League South | 10 | 1 | 0 | 0 | 0 | 0 | 0 | 0 | 10 | 1 |
| Enfield Town | 2023–24 | Isthmian League Premier Division | 35 | 0 | 2 | 0 | – | | 3 (Note: 2 appearances in Isthmian League Premier Division play-offs, 1 appearance in Middlesex Senior Cup) | 0 | 40 | 0 |
| Enfield Town | 2024–25 | National League South | 16 | 0 | 1 | 0 | – | | 4 (Note: 2 appearances in FA Trophy, 1 appearance in London Senior Cup, 1 appearance in Middlesex Senior Cup) | 0 | 21 | 0 |
| Enfield Town | Total | | 51 | 0 | 3 | 0 | 0 | 0 | 7 | 0 | 61 | 0 |
| Potters Bar Town (loan) | 2024–25 | Isthmian League Premier Division | 11 | 1 | 0 | 0 | – | | 2 (Note: Appearance(s) in Hertfordshire Senior Cup) | 2 | 13 | 3 |
| Potters Bar Town | 2025–26 | Isthmian League Premier Division | 32 | 3 | 2 | 0 | – | | 0 | 0 | 34 | 3 |
| Career total | | | 145 | 10 | 8 | 1 | 0 | 0 | 12 | 2 | 165 | 13 |

== Honours ==
=== Enfield Town ===
- Isthmian Premier Division play-offs: 2024
