= Kwaku Frimpong =

Welsh footballer (born 2002)

Personal information
- Full name: Kwaku Amponsah Frimpong
- Date of birth: 6 November 2002 (age 24)
- Place of birth: Cardiff, Wales
- Height: 1.81 m (5 ft 11 in)
- Position: Midfielder

Team information
- Current team: Aldershot Town
- Number: 15

Youth career
- 2018–2021: Crystal Palace

Senior career*
Years	Team	Apps	(Gls)
2021–2023	AFC Wimbledon	1	(0)
2021–2022	→ Leatherhead (loan)	7	(0)
2022	→ Carshalton Athletic (loan)	11	(1)
2022	→ Dartford (loan)	3	(0)
2023	→ Potters Bar Town (loan)	4	(0)
2023	→ Metropolitan Police (loan)	7	(1)
2023–2025	Carshalton Athletic	67	(7)
2025–2026	Worthing	15	(1)
2026	→ Hampton & Richmond Borough (loan)	13	(2)
2026–	Aldershot Town	0	(0)
- * Club domestic league appearances and goals as of 19:35, 12 May 2026 (UTC)

Kwaku Amponsah Frimpong (born 6 November 2002) is a Welsh professional footballer who plays as a midfielder for National League club Aldershot Town.

He started his career with AFC Wimbledon and had loan spells at Leatherhead, Carshalton Athletic, Dartford, Potters Bar Town and Metropolitan Police.

== Career ==
=== AFC Wimbledon ===
Frimpong joined the Academy at AFC Wimbledon at the age of sixteen on the recommendation of Ben Thatcher, after being released by Crystal Palace academy and signed his first professional contract with the club in July 2021. He enjoyed a loan spell at Leatherhead in the first half of the 2021–22 season, which Wimbledon loan manager Michael Hamilton described as "testing... including having to fight for a place in the team, adjust to different managers, and display good resilience". He joined another Isthmian League Premier Division club, Carshalton Athletic, on loan on 3 January 2022. He scored his first goal at a senior level on 22 January, in a 5–4 defeat at Cray Wanderers. However, he tore his retinaculum in February, which saw him sidelined for two months, before he returned to fitness and enjoyed a "strong finish to the season".

He made his first-team debut for AFC Wimbledon on 30 August 2022, when he came on as an 82nd-minute substitute for Paul Osew in a 2–1 defeat to Aston Villa U21. On 11 September, he joined National League South club Dartford on a one month loan. He played 34 minutes for the club in a 3–1 win at Dover Athletic two days later. He was sent off in an FA Cup second qualifying round defeat to Beckenham Town. He scored his first goal for AFC Wimbledon on 20 September, in a 3–2 home win over Crawley Town in the EFL Trophy; he started the game at right wing-back and played his first full ninety minutes for the club. He made his EFL League Two debut on 22 October, in a 2–1 win at Rochdale. He had been called into the matchday squad by manager Johnnie Jackson following an injury to George Marsh. Following a month loan spell with Potters Bar Town, Frimpong joined Metropolitan Police on loan until the end of the season in February 2023. He was released at the end of the season.

=== Non-League ===
In May 2023, he returned to Isthmian League Premier Division side Carshalton Athletic on a permanent basis.

On 30 May 2025, Frimpong joined National League South side Worthing.

On 12 May 2026, Frimpong joined National League side, Aldershot Town following his release from Worthing.

== Style of play ==
The AFC Wimbledon website describes Frimpong as a "tough-tackling midfielder" but during his time at carshalton, he has shown a more offensive side to his game. Taking the game to the opposition, skills, dribbles, assists and good goals including one from his own half has shown football fans a different side to his game.

== Career statistics ==
As of end of 2024–25 season

Appearances and goals by club, season and competition
Club	Season	League			FA Cup		EFL Cup		Other		Total	
Club	Season	Division	Apps	Goals	Apps	Goals	Apps	Goals	Apps	Goals	Apps	Goals
AFC Wimbledon	2021–22	EFL League Two	0	0	0	0	0	0	0	0	0	0
AFC Wimbledon	2022–23	EFL League Two	1	0	0	0	0	0	3 (Note: Appearance(s) in EFL Trophy)	1	4	1
AFC Wimbledon	Total		1	0	0	0	0	0	3	1	4	1
Leatherhead (loan)	2021–22	Isthmian League; Premier Division	7	0	2	0	0	0	1 (Note: Appearance(s) in FA Trophy)	0	10	0
Carshalton Athletic (loan)	2021–22	Isthmian League; Premier Division	11	1	0	0	0	0	1 (Note: Appearance(s) in Alan Turvey Trophy)	0	12	1
Dartford (loan)	2022–23	National League South	1	0	1	0	0	0	0	0	2	0
Potters Bar Town (loan)	2022–23	Isthmian League; Premier Division	4	0	0	0	0	0	0	0	4	0
Metropolitan Police (loan)	2022–23	Southern League; Premier Division South	3	0	0	0	0	0	1	0	4	0
Carshalton Athletic	2023–24	Isthmian League; Premier Division	41	6	5	1	—		2	0	48	6
Carshalton Athletic	2024–25	Isthmian League Premier Division	26	1	1	0	—		2 (Note: Appearance(s) in Surrey Senior Cup)	2	29	3
Carshalton Athletic	Total		67	7	6	1	0	0	4	2	77	9
Career total			94	8	9	1	0	0	10	3	113	11
