= Quaine Bartley =

English footballer

Personal information
- Date of birth: 28 October 2003 (age 23)
- Place of birth: Whittington, England
- Position: Forward

Team information
- Current team: AFC Wimbledon
- Number: 20

Youth career
- Tottenham Hotspur
- AFC Wimbledon

Senior career*
| Years | Team | Apps | (Gls) |
| 2021–2024 | AFC Wimbledon | 7 | (0) |
| 2021 | → Cray Wanderers (loan) | 4 | (0) |
| 2022 | → Potters Bar Town (loan) | 1 | (0) |
| 2023 | → Wingate & Finchley (loan) | 2 | (0) |
| 2023 | → King's Lynn Town (loan) | 8 | (0) |
- * Club domestic league appearances and goals as of 20:00, 10 November 2023 (UTC)

Quaine Bartley (born 28 October 2003) is an English professional footballer who played as a forward for EFL League One club AFC Wimbledon before being released at the end of the 2023/24 season. He has played on loan at Cray Wanderers and Potters Bar Town.

== Career ==
Bartley joined the Academy at AFC Wimbledon from Tottenham Hotspur at under-13 level. He joined Isthmian League Premier Division club Cray Wanderers on a 28-day loan on 25 September 2021. Loans manager Michael Hamilton said that "we always prioritise a player's development over results for our academy team". On 5 February 2022, he joined Potters Bar Town on loan. He scored over twenty goals to help the AFC Wimbledon academy to secure its first ever Youth Alliance League title in the 2021–22 season and signed his first professional contract in August 2022.

He made his senior debut for the club on 9 August 2022, coming on as an 89th-minute substitute for George Marsh in a 2–0 defeat to Gillingham in an EFL Cup match at Plough Lane. He made his EFL League Two debut in a 1–0 defeat at Barrow on 27 August, and said after the game that "all you want to do is come on and make an impact".

Bartley joined King's Lynn Town on a season long loan ahead of the 2023-24 season.

His loan was cancelled by King's Lynn in October 2023 after he was pictured on social media on holiday in Dubai while he was supposedly unavailable for selection due to illness.

== Style of play ==
AFC Wimbledon Academy manager Michael Hamilton described Bartley as a powerful centre-forward with very good technical skills.

== Career statistics ==
As of match played 9 May 2023

Appearances and goals by club, season and competition
| Club | Season | League | | | FA Cup | | League Cup | | Other | | Total | |
| Club | Season | Division | Apps | Goals | Apps | Goals | Apps | Goals | Apps | Goals | Apps | Goals |
|---|---|---|---|---|---|---|---|---|---|---|---|---|
| AFC Wimbledon | 2021–22 | League Two | 0 | 0 | 0 | 0 | 0 | 0 | 0 | 0 | 0 | 0 |
| AFC Wimbledon | 2022–23 | League Two | 7 | 0 | 1 | 0 | 1 | 0 | 4 (Note: Appearance(s) in EFL Trophy) | 0 | 13 | 0 |
| AFC Wimbledon | Total | | 7 | 0 | 1 | 0 | 1 | 0 | 4 | 0 | 13 | 0 |
| Cray Wanderers (loan) | 2021–22 | Isthmian League; Premier Division | 4 | 0 | 0 | 0 | 0 | 0 | 0 | 0 | 4 | 0 |
| Potters Bar Town (loan) | 2021–22 | Isthmian League; Premier Division | 1 | 0 | 0 | 0 | 0 | 0 | 0 | 0 | 1 | 0 |
| Career total | | | 12 | 0 | 1 | 0 | 1 | 0 | 4 | 0 | 18 | 0 |
