= 2021–22 AFC Wimbledon season =

AFC Wimbledon
2021–22 season
- CEO: Joe Palmer
- Head Coach: Mark Robinson (until 28 March); Mark Bowen (from 30 March)
- Stadium: Plough Lane
- League One: 23rd (relegated)
- FA Cup: Third round
- EFL Cup: Third round
- EFL Trophy: Group stage
- Top goalscorer: League: Jack Rudoni (10); All: Jack Rudoni (10)
| Home colours | Away colours | Third colours |

The 2021–22 season was AFC Wimbledon's 20th year in their history and sixth consecutive season in League One. Along with the league, the club also competed in the FA Cup, the EFL Cup and the 2021–22 EFL Trophy. The season covers the period from 1 July 2021 to 30 June 2022.

== Pre-season friendlies ==
AFC Wimbledon confirmed friendly matches against Brentford, Kingstonian, Metropolitan Police, Hampton & Richmond Borough, Dartford and Woking as part of their pre-season preparations.

| 17 July 2021 Friendly | AFC Wimbledon | 0–1 | Brentford | Wimbledon |
| 15:00 BST | | Report | Valencia 42' | Stadium: Plough Lane; Attendance: 2,500 |

| 20 July 2021 Friendly | Kingstonian | 2–0 | AFC Wimbledon | Tolworth |
| 19:30 BST | Cooper 45'; Buchanan 82' | Report | | Stadium: King George's Field |

| 20 July 2021 Friendly | Metropolitan Police | 0–1 | AFC Wimbledon | Molesey |
| 19:45 BST | | Report | Robinson 81' (pen.) | Stadium: Imber Court |

| 23 July 2021 Friendly | Hampton & Richmond Borough | 1–1 | AFC Wimbledon | Hampton |
| 19:45 BST | Trialist 65' | Report | McCormick 69' | Stadium: The Beveree Stadium |

| 24 July 2021 Friendly | Dartford | 1–0 | AFC Wimbledon | Dartford |
| 15:00 BST | Porter 21' | Report | | Stadium: Princes Park; Attendance: 868 |

| 27 July 2021 Friendly | Woking | 1–0 | AFC Wimbledon | Woking |
| 19:30 BST | Campbell 62' | Report | | Stadium: Laithwaite Community Stadium |

| 31 July 2021 Friendly | AFC Wimbledon | 1–2 | Scunthorpe United | Wimbledon |
| 15:00 BST | Palmer 4' (pen.) | Report | Bunn 31'; Loft 39' (pen.) | Stadium: Plough Lane; Attendance: 4,000 |

== Competitions ==
=== League One ===
==== League table ====
| Pos | Team | Pld | W | D | L | GF | GA | GD | Pts | Promotion, qualification or relegation |
|---|---|---|---|---|---|---|---|---|---|---|
| 17 | Lincoln City | 46 | 14 | 10 | 22 | 55 | 63 | −8 | 52 | |
| 18 | Shrewsbury Town | 46 | 12 | 14 | 20 | 47 | 51 | −4 | 50 | |
| 19 | Morecambe | 46 | 10 | 12 | 24 | 57 | 88 | −31 | 42 | |
| 20 | Fleetwood Town | 46 | 8 | 16 | 22 | 62 | 82 | −20 | 40 | |
| 21 | Gillingham (R) | 46 | 8 | 16 | 22 | 35 | 69 | −34 | 40 | Relegation to EFL League Two |
| 22 | Doncaster Rovers (R) | 46 | 10 | 8 | 28 | 37 | 82 | −45 | 38 | Relegation to EFL League Two |
| 23 | AFC Wimbledon (R) | 46 | 6 | 19 | 21 | 49 | 75 | −26 | 37 | Relegation to EFL League Two |
| 24 | Crewe Alexandra (R) | 46 | 7 | 8 | 31 | 37 | 83 | −46 | 29 | Relegation to EFL League Two |

Source: EFL Official Website
Rules for classification: 1) Points; 2) Goal difference; 3) Number of goals scored; 4) Head-to-head results; 5) Wins; 6) Away goals; 7) Penalty points based on yellow and red cards received excluding the last four games of the season (sec 9.5); 8) 12-point sending off offences; 9) If the tie affects the automatic promotion or relegation places, a play-off game or games would be held between the two tied teams
(R) Relegated

==== Results summary ====
| Overall | | | | | | | | Home | | | | | | Away | | | | | |
| Pld | W | D | L | GF | GA | GD | Pts | W | D | L | GF | GA | GD | W | D | L | GF | GA | GD |
|---|---|---|---|---|---|---|---|---|---|---|---|---|---|---|---|---|---|---|---|
| 46 | 6 | 19 | 21 | 49 | 75 | −26 | 37 | 2 | 14 | 7 | 27 | 34 | −7 | 4 | 5 | 14 | 22 | 41 | −19 |

Last updated: 30 April 2022.

==== Results by matchday ====
| Matchday | 1 | 2 | 3 | 4 | 5 | 6 | 7 | 8 | 9 | 10 | 11 | 12 | 13 | 14 | 15 | 16 | 17 | 18 | 19 | 20 | 21 | 22 | 23 | 24 | 25 | 26 | 27 | 28 | 29 | 30 | 31 | 32 | 33 | 34 | 35 | 36 | 37 | 38 | 39 | 40 | 41 | 42 | 43 | 44 | 45 | 46 |
|---|---|---|---|---|---|---|---|---|---|---|---|---|---|---|---|---|---|---|---|---|---|---|---|---|---|---|---|---|---|---|---|---|---|---|---|---|---|---|---|---|---|---|---|---|---|---|
| Ground | A | H | H | A | A | H | A | H | A | A | H | H | A | H | A | A | H | H | A | A | A | A | H | H | A | H | H | H | A | H | H | A | A | H | A | A | H | A | H | A | H | H | A | H | A | H |
| Result | W | D | D | L | D | W | W | L | L | L | D | D | W | L | L | L | W | D | W | D | L | L | D | D | D | L | D | D | L | L | D | L | D | D | L | L | L | L | L | L | D | D | L | D | D | L |
| Position | 2 | 7 | 10 | 14 | 15 | 9 | 4 | 7 | 8 | 14 | 14 | 17 | 14 | 15 | 17 | 19 | 18 | 17 | 17 | 17 | 18 | 20 | 20 | 20 | 19 | 20 | 20 | 20 | 20 | 20 | 20 | 20 | 20 | 20 | 20 | 20 | 20 | 21 | 21 | 22 | 22 | 22 | 22 | 22 | 22 | 23 |

Updated to match(es) played on 30 April 2022. Source: Statto.com
A = Away; H = Home; W = Win; D = Draw; L = Loss

==== Matches ====
AFC Wimbledon's fixtures were announced on 24 June 2021.

| 7 August 2021 1 | Doncaster Rovers | 1–2 | AFC Wimbledon | Doncaster |
| 15:00 BST | Seaman 46' | Report | Hartigan (yellow card) 32'; Assal 58'; McCormick 74', (yellow card) 75'; Guinness-Walker (yellow card) 90+1' | Stadium: Keepmoat Stadium; Attendance: 6,419; Referee: Sam Barrott |

| 14 August 2021 2 | AFC Wimbledon | 3–3 | Bolton Wanderers | Wimbledon |
| 15:00 BST | Nightingale 20'; Tzanev (yellow card) 22'; Heneghan (yellow card) 62'; Guinness-Walker (yellow card) 65'; Pressley 74' (pen.); Mebude 75'; Assal (yellow card) 80' | Report | Doyle 23' (pen.); Sheehan 27', (yellow card) 35'; Afolayan 48'; Jones (yellow card) 53' | Stadium: Plough Lane; Attendance: 7,728; Referee: Peter Wright |

| 17 August 2021 3 | AFC Wimbledon | 1–1 | Gillingham | Wimbledon |
| 15:00 BST | Mebude (yellow card) 39'; Nightingale (yellow card) 73'; Palmer 85' (yellow card) 87'; Assal (yellow card) 90+6' | Report | McKenzie (yellow card) 11'; Tutonda (yellow card) 55' (yellow-red card) 72'; Tucker (yellow card) 67'; O'Keefe (yellow card) 90+2'; Kalambayi 90+7' (o.g.); Oliver (yellow card) 90+7' | Stadium: Plough Lane; Attendance: 7,027; Referee: Carl Brook |

| 21 August 2021 4 | Sunderland | 1–0 | AFC Wimbledon | Sunderland |
| 15:00 BST | Gooch (yellow card) 18'; Flanagan (yellow card) 27'; Winchester 64'; O'Nien (yellow card) 90+4' | Report | Assal (yellow card) 62' | Stadium: Stadium of Light; Attendance: 29,093; Referee: James Oldham |

| 28 August 2021 5 | Ipswich Town | 2–2 | AFC Wimbledon | Ipswich |
| 15:00 BST | Pigott 52' (pen.); Burns 54'; Hladký (yellow card) 79' | Report | Woodyard (yellow card) 16'; Hartigan (yellow card) 45'; Nightingale (yellow card) 52'; Heneghan 58'; Rudoni 90+5' | Stadium: Portman Road; Attendance: 19,051; Referee: David Rock |

| 4 September 2021 6 | AFC Wimbledon | 3–1 | Oxford United | Wimbledon |
| 15:00 BST | Guinness-Walker (yellow card) 37'; Heneghan (yellow card) 54'; Rudoni 55', 81'; Nightingale 78'; Chislett (yellow card) 79' | Report | Seddon (yellow card) 13'; Sykes 45+1' | Stadium: Plough Lane; Attendance: 7,542; Referee: Brett Huxtable |

| 11 September 2021 7 | Morecambe | 3–4 | AFC Wimbledon | Morecambe |
| 15:00 BST | Stockton 49', 65'; McLoughlin 54'; Leigh (yellow card) 73'; Delaney (yellow card) 89' | Report | Hartigan 5'; Mebude (yellow card) 25'; Lawrence (yellow card) 35'; Chislett 61', (yellow card) 67'; Nightingale 72'; Assal 90+4', (yellow card) 90+5' | Stadium: Mazuma Stadium; Attendance: 3,173; Referee: Seb Stockbridge |

| 18 September 2021 8 | AFC Wimbledon | 0–1 | Plymouth Argyle | Wimbledon |
| 15:00 BST | Chislett (yellow card) 14'; McCormick (yellow card) 60' | Report | Hardie 47', (yellow card) 88'; Cooper (yellow card) 68' | Stadium: Plough Lane; Attendance: 7,578; Referee: Tom Nield |

| 25 September 2021 9 | Shrewsbury Town | 2–1 | AFC Wimbledon | Shrewsbury |
| 15:00 BST | Leahy 41'; Bennett (yellow card) 45+1'; Udoh 67' | Report | Mebude 32'; Assal (yellow card) 52' | Stadium: Montgomery Waters Meadow; Attendance: 5,346; Referee: James Bell |

| 28 September 2021 10 | Rotherham United | 3–0 | AFC Wimbledon | Rotherham |
| 19:45 BST | Grigg 36'; Smith 45+1', 89'; Johansson (yellow card) 81' | Report | Pressley (yellow card) 80' | Stadium: AESSEAL New York Stadium; Attendance: 8,004; Referee: Andy Haines |

| 2 October 2021 11 | AFC Wimbledon | 1–1 | Burton Albion | Wimbledon |
| 15:00 BST | McCormick 90' | Report | Hamer (yellow card) 45+3'; Hemmings 66'; Oshilaja (yellow card) 90+6' | Stadium: Plough Lane; Attendance: 7,413; Referee: Lee Swabey |

| 16 October 2021 12 | AFC Wimbledon | 2–2 | Sheffield Wednesday | Wimbledon |
| 15:00 BST | Guinness-Walker 67'; Rudoni 85' | Report | Gregory 13', 61' (pen.); Dunkley (yellow card) 27'; Brown (yellow card) 90+4' | Stadium: Plough Lane; Attendance: 8,224; Referee: Chris Sarginson |

| 19 October 2021 13 | Lincoln City | 0–1 | AFC Wimbledon | Lincoln |
| 19:45 GMT | Eyoma (yellow card) 30'; Montsma (yellow card) 35'; Fiorini (yellow card) 81' | Report | Pressley 5' (pen.), (yellow card) 67'; Hartigan (yellow card) 22'; Lawrence (yellow card) 35' | Stadium: LNER Stadium; Attendance: 7,750; Referee: Paul Howard |

| 23 October 2021 14 | AFC Wimbledon | 0–2 | Wigan Athletic | Wimbledon |
| 15:00 BST | | Report | Watts (yellow card) 34'; McClean (yellow card) 40', (goal) 54'; Kalambayi 50' (o.g.); Darikwa (yellow card) 61' | Stadium: Plough Lane; Attendance: 8,024; Referee: Ollie Yates |

| 30 October 2021 15 | Cambridge United | 1–0 | AFC Wimbledon | Cambridge |
| 15:00 BST | Iredale (yellow card) 43'; Weir 47'; Williams (yellow card) 71'; Jones (yellow card) 73' | Report | Palmer (yellow card) 73'; Woodyard (yellow card) 90' | Stadium: Abbey Stadium; Attendance: 5,609; Referee: Tom Reeves |

| 20 November 2021 16 | Portsmouth | 2–1 | AFC Wimbledon | Milton |
| 15:00 GMT | Brown (yellow card) 28'; Jacobs 63'; Harness 89' | Report | Palmer 24' (pen.); Assal (yellow card) 65' | Stadium: Fratton Park; Attendance: 16,234; Referee: Thomas Bramall |

| 23 November 2021 17 | AFC Wimbledon | 3–2 | Crewe Alexandra | Wimbledon |
| 19:45 GMT | Rudoni 24'; Palmer 35', 44' (pen.); Heneghan (yellow card) 81'; Assal (yellow card) 90+2' (yellow-red card) 90+4' | Report | Long 11'; Murphy (yellow card) 44'; Sass-Davies (yellow card) 79'; Porter 89'; Williams (yellow card) 90+4' | Stadium: Plough Lane; Attendance: 6,943; Referee: Craig Hicks |

| 27 November 2021 18 | AFC Wimbledon | 2–2 | Fleetwood Town | Wimbledon |
| 15:00 GMT | Heneghan (yellow card) 25'; Assal 53'; McCormick 79' | Report | Matete (yellow card) 23'; Garner 35'; Johnson 84'; Edmondson (yellow card) 90+6' | Stadium: Plough Lane; Attendance: 7,405; Referee: Bobby Madley |

| 7 December 2021 19 | Accrington Stanley | 0–2 | AFC Wimbledon | Accrington |
| 19:45 GMT | Hamilton (yellow card) 45'; Nottingham (yellow card) 66' | Report | McCormick 59'; Assal 76' | Stadium: Wham Stadium; Attendance: 1,746; Referee: Simon Mather |

| 11 December 2021 20 | Wycombe Wanderers | 2–2 | AFC Wimbledon | High Wycombe |
| 15:00 GMT | Thompson (yellow card) 62'; Akinfenwa 74'; Jacobson 90+6' (pen.) | Report | Rudoni 4', 90+2', (yellow card) 90+3'; McCormick (yellow card) 33'; Assal (yellow card) 51'; Osew (yellow card) 90+5' | Stadium: Adams Park; Attendance: 4,915; Referee: Will Finnie |

| 29 December 2021 21 | Oxford United | 3–0 | AFC Wimbledon | Littlemore |
| 19:45 GMT | Sykes 27'; Taylor 38'; Kane (yellow card) 43'; Long 60'; Moore (yellow card) 76' | Report | Csóka (yellow card) 62'; Woodyard (yellow card) 72'; Marsh (yellow card) 75' | Stadium: The Kassam Stadium; Attendance: 7,915; Referee: Trevor Kettle |

| 11 January 2022 22 | Milton Keynes Dons | 1–0 | AFC Wimbledon | Denbigh |
| 19:45 GMT | O'Riley 29' | Report | Guinness-Walker (yellow card) 23' (yellow-red card) 36' | Stadium: Stadium MK; Attendance: 7,663; Referee: Anthony Backhouse |

| 15 January 2022 23 | AFC Wimbledon | 0–0 | Morecambe | Wimbledon |
| 15:00 GMT | Marsh (yellow card) 83'; Ablade (yellow card) 90+1' | Report | Wildig (yellow card) 58'; Leigh (yellow card) 65' | Stadium: Plough Lane; Attendance: 7,128; Referee: Ben Speedie |

| 18 January 2022 24 | AFC Wimbledon | 0–0 | Portsmouth | Wimbledon |
| 19:45 GMT | Woodyard (yellow card) 25'; McCormick (yellow card) 90+3' | Report | Harness (yellow card) 19'; Romeo (yellow card) 50' | Stadium: Plough Lane; Attendance: 8,086; Referee: James Oldham |

| 22 January 2022 25 | Burton Albion | 1–1 | AFC Wimbledon | Burton upon Trent |
| 15:00 GMT | Taylor (yellow card) 45+1'; Oshilaja (yellow card) 57'; Jebbison 77' | Report | Palmer 70' | Stadium: Pirelli Stadium; Attendance: 2,768; Referee: Andrew Kitchen |

| 25 January 2022 26 | AFC Wimbledon | 0–2 | Ipswich Town | Wimbledon |
| 19:45 GMT | McCormick (yellow card) 53' | Report | Edmundson (yellow card) 47'; Burns 61', 86'; Vincent-Young (yellow card) 86' (yellow-red card) 90+5' | Stadium: Plough Lane; Attendance: 8,117; Referee: Lee Swabey |

| 29 January 2022 27 | AFC Wimbledon | 1–1 | Shrewsbury Town | Wimbledon |
| 15:00 GMT | Assal 13', (yellow card) 45+3'; Rudoni (yellow card) 30'; Heneghan (yellow card) 77' | Report | Vela (yellow card) 47'; Udoh 58'; Bennett (yellow card) 87' | Stadium: Plough Lane; Attendance: 7,824; Referee: Carl Boyeson |

| 1 February 2022 28 | AFC Wimbledon | 2–2 | Cheltenham Town | Wimbledon |
| 19:45 GMT | Assal 8'; Brown (yellow card) 45+2'; Marsh (yellow card) 61'; Cosgrave 80', (yellow card) 90+6' | Report | Sercombe (yellow card) 16'; Raglan (yellow card) 26'; May 31', 34' (pen.); Hutchinson (yellow card) 66' | Stadium: Plough Lane; Attendance: 6,138; Referee: Sam Purkiss |

| 5 February 2022 29 | Charlton Athletic | 3–2 | AFC Wimbledon | Charlton |
| 15:00 GMT | Inniss 18', (yellow card) 90'; Jaiyesimi (yellow card) 29'; Washington 31'; Gilbey (yellow card) 54'; Famewo 60'; Clare (yellow card) 79' | Report | Chislett 3'; Heneghan 36' | Stadium: The Valley; Attendance: 22,486; Referee: Christopher Pollard |

| 8 February 2022 30 | AFC Wimbledon | 0–1 | Rotherham United | Wimbledon |
| 19:45 GMT | Nightingale (yellow card) 47'; Marsh (yellow card) 90+6' | Report | Mattock (yellow card) 31'; Kayode 60' | Stadium: Plough Lane; Attendance: 6,387; Referee: Charles Breakspear |

| 12 February 2022 31 | AFC Wimbledon | 1–1 | Sunderland | Wimbledon |
| 15:00 GMT | McCormick 20' (pen.), (yellow card) 44' (yellow-red card) 90'; Heneghan (yellow card) 25'; Osew (yellow card) 57'; Chislett (yellow card) 68'; Assal (yellow card) 90+5' | Report | Pritchard 35'; Winchester (yellow card) 45+1'; Clarke (yellow card) 54'; Matete (yellow card) 67'; Evans (yellow card) 75'; Wright (yellow card) 80'; Defoe (yellow card) 83'; Neil (yellow card) 90+1' | Stadium: Plough Lane; Attendance: 8,381; Referee: Simon Mather |

| 19 February 2022 32 | Bolton Wanderers | 4–0 | AFC Wimbledon | Horwich |
| 15:00 GMT | Böðvarsson 36'; Afolayan (yellow card) 42', (goal) 56'; Charles 67'; Bakayoko 87' | Report | Marsh (yellow card) 12' | Stadium: University of Bolton Stadium; Attendance: 14,537; Referee: Rebecca Welch |

| 22 February 2022 33 | Gillingham | 0–0 | AFC Wimbledon | Gillingham |
| 19:45 GMT | Tucker (yellow card) 74'; Lee (yellow card) 83' | Report | Mebude (yellow card) 90+4' | Stadium: Priestfield; Attendance: 4,151; Referee: Chris Sarginson |

| 26 February 2022 34 | AFC Wimbledon | 2–2 | Doncaster Rovers | Wimbledon |
| 15:00 GMT | Rudoni 23'; McCormick (yellow card) 39', (goal) 49'; Marsh (yellow card) 90+1' | Report | Olowu (yellow card) 22'; Gardner (yellow card) 54'; Rowe 63', 66'; Smith (yellow card) 79' | Stadium: Plough Lane Stadium; Attendance: 7,912; Referee: Robert Lewis |

| 5 March 2022 35 | Wigan Athletic | 1–0 | AFC Wimbledon | Wigan |
| 15:00 GMT | Keane 21'; Edwards (yellow card) 54'; Naylor (yellow card) 77' | Report | | Stadium: DW Stadium; Attendance: 9,780; Referee: Oliver Langford |

| 8 March 2022 36 | Plymouth Argyle | 2–0 | AFC Wimbledon | Plymouth |
| 19:45 GMT | Hardie 29'; Mayor (yellow card) 32'; Broom 61'; Sessegnon (yellow card) 90+3' | Report | | Stadium: Home Park; Referee: Sam Allison |

| 12 March 2022 37 | AFC Wimbledon | 0–2 | Lincoln City | Wimbledon |
| 15:00 GMT | Mebude (yellow card) 60'; Brown (yellow card) 66'; Robinson (yellow card) 78'; Hartigan (yellow card) 88' | Report | Fiorini 38', (yellow card) 69'; Norton-Cuffy (red card) 66'; Maguire (yellow card) 72'; Eyoma (yellow card) 79'; Bishop 82' | Stadium: Plough Lane Stadium; Attendance: 8,174; Referee: Carl Brook |

| 19 March 2022 38 | Cheltenham Town | 3–1 | AFC Wimbledon | Cheltenham |
| 15:00 GMT | Raglan (yellow card) 17'; Williams (yellow card) 63'; Wright 81'; Lloyd 83'; May 90+2' | Report | Rudoni 26'; Hartigan (yellow card) 86' | Stadium: The Jonny Rocks Stadium; Attendance: 3,836; Referee: Scott Oldham |

| 26 March 2022 39 | AFC Wimbledon | 0–1 | Cambridge United | Wimbledon |
| 15:00 GMT | Cosgrove (yellow card) 28'; Rudoni (yellow card) 45'; Nightingale (yellow card) 63' | Report | May 46'; Tracey (yellow card) 90+2'; Digby (yellow card) 90+4' | Stadium: Plough Lane Stadium; Attendance: 8,463; Referee: Garry Maskell |

| 2 April 2022 40 | Sheffield Wednesday | 2–1 | AFC Wimbledon | Owlerton |
| 15:00 BST | Hunt 11'; Gregory (yellow card) 52', (goal) 90+2'; Dean (yellow card) 90+1' | Report | Assal 22'; Csóka (yellow card) 90+6' | Stadium: Hillsborough; Attendance: 22,374; Referee: Peter Wright |

| 5 April 2022 41 | AFC Wimbledon | 1–1 | Charlton Athletic | Wimbledon |
| 19:45 BST | Robinson 87'; Mebude (yellow card) 90+2' | Report | Dobson (yellow card) 54'; Inniss (red card) 56'; Stockley 69'; Purrington (yellow card) 84' | Stadium: Plough Lane; Attendance: 8,184; Referee: Neil Hair |

| 9 April 2022 42 | AFC Wimbledon | 1–1 | Milton Keynes Dons | Wimbledon |
| 15:00 BST | Woodyard 19'; Heneghan (yellow card) 36'; Assal (yellow card) 45+1'; Marsh (yellow card) 67' | Report | Harvie (yellow card) 40'; O'Hora (yellow card) 45+1'; Parrott 80' | Stadium: Plough Lane; Attendance: 7,841; Referee: James Oldham |

| 15 April 2022 43 | Crewe Alexandra | 3–1 | AFC Wimbledon | Crewe |
| 15:00 BST | Mandron 60'; Long 62'; Sambou 90+8' | Report | Cosgrove 19' | Stadium: Mornflake Stadium; Attendance: 4,668; Referee: David Webb |

| 18 April 2022 44 | AFC Wimbledon | 1–1 | Wycombe Wanderers | Wimbledon |
| 15:00 BST | Rudoni 21'; Marsh (yellow card) 58'; Brown (yellow card) 70' | Report | Tafazolli (yellow card) 73'; Akinfenwa 80'; Scowen (yellow card) 86' | Stadium: Plough Lane; Attendance: 8,502; Referee: Sam Barrott |

| 23 April 2022 45 | Fleetwood Town | 1–1 | AFC Wimbledon | Fleetwood |
| 15:00 BST | Garner 88', (yellow card) 88'; Batty (yellow card) 90+2' | Report | McCormick 22'; Marsh (yellow card) 38'; Cosgrove (yellow card) 63'; Osei (yellow card) 76'; Heneghan (yellow card) 77'; Brown (yellow card) 90+10' | Stadium: Highbury Stadium; Attendance: 5,019; Referee: Anthony Backhouse |

| 30 April 2022 46 | AFC Wimbledon | 3–4 | Accrington Stanley | Wimbledon |
| 12:30 BST | Assal 56'; Rudoni 58', 66' | Report | Rich-Baghuelou 18', (yellow card) 73'; Bishop 35'; Nottingham 45'; O'Sullivan 63'; Butcher (yellow card) 81' | Stadium: Plough Lane; Attendance: 7,839; Referee: David Rock |

=== FA Cup ===
AFC Wimbledon were drawn at home to Guiseley in the first round, Cheltenham Town in the second round and away to Boreham Wood in the third round.

| 6 November 2021 First round | AFC Wimbledon | 1–0 | Guiseley | Wimbledon |
| 15:00 GMT | Palmer 44' | report | | Stadium: Plough Lane; Attendance: 4,973; Referee: Martin Woods |

| 4 December 2021 Second round | AFC Wimbledon | 4–3 | Cheltenham Town | Wimbledon |
| 15:00 GMT | Assal 36', 55'; Palmer 41', 65' | report | May 2'; Williams 73'; Heneghan 81' (o.g.) | Stadium: Plough Lane; Attendance: 4,322; Referee: Alan Young |

| 8 January 2022 Third round | Boreham Wood | 2–0 | AFC Wimbledon | Borehamwood |
| 15:00 GMT | Marsh 10', (yellow card) 73'; Clifton 86' | Report | Rudoni (yellow card) 16' | Stadium: Meadow Park; Attendance: 3,501; Referee: James Bell |

=== EFL Cup ===
AFC Wimbledon were drawn away to Charlton Athletic in the first round Northampton Town in the second round and Arsenal in the third round.

| 10 August 2021 First round | Charlton Athletic | 0–1 | AFC Wimbledon | Charlton |
| 19:45 BST | Dobson (yellow card) 81'; Stockley (yellow card) 86' | Report | Osew 26'; Marsh (yellow card) 52' | Stadium: The Valley; Attendance: 3,372; Referee: Robert Lewis |

| 24 August 2021 Second round | Northampton Town | 0–1 | AFC Wimbledon | Northampton |
| 19:45 BST | Horsfall (yellow card) 34'; Hoskins (yellow card) 85' | Report | Csóka (yellow card) 17'; Pressley (yellow card) 34'; Hartigan 90+5' | Stadium: Sixfields Stadium; Attendance: 3,257; Referee: Ross Joyce |

| 22 September 2021 Third round | Arsenal | 3–0 | AFC Wimbledon | Holloway |
| 19:45 BST | Lacazette 11' (pen.); Smith Rowe 77'; Nketiah 80' | Report | McCormick (yellow card) 30'; Heneghan (yellow card) 45' | Stadium: Emirates Stadium; Attendance: 56,276; Referee: Jarred Gillett |

=== EFL Trophy ===
AFC Wimbledon were drawn into Southern Group B alongside Crystal Palace U21s, Portsmouth and Sutton United.

| Pos | Div | Team | Pld | W | PW | PL | L | GF | GA | GD | Pts | Qualification |
|---|---|---|---|---|---|---|---|---|---|---|---|---|
| 1 | L2 | Sutton United | 3 | 3 | 0 | 0 | 0 | 6 | 0 | +6 | 9 | Advance to Round 2 |
| 2 | L1 | Portsmouth | 3 | 1 | 0 | 0 | 2 | 6 | 7 | −1 | 3 | Advance to Round 2 |
| 3 | L1 | AFC Wimbledon | 3 | 1 | 0 | 0 | 2 | 5 | 6 | −1 | 3 | |
| 4 | ACA | Crystal Palace U21 | 3 | 1 | 0 | 0 | 2 | 2 | 6 | −4 | 3 | |

Source: EFL.com

| 7 September 2021 Group game 1 | AFC Wimbledon | 5–3 | Portsmouth | Wimbledon |
| 19:45 BST | Kalambayi 2'; Pressley 43', 80' (pen.); Lawrence (yellow card) 72'; Nightingale 87'; McCormick 90+4' | Report | Mnoga (yellow card) 2'; Harrison 45+4', 52', 78' | Stadium: Plough Lane; Attendance: 3,600; Referee: Darren Drysdale |

| 26 October 2021 Group game 2 | AFC Wimbledon | 0–2 | Crystal Palace U21 | Wimbledon |
| 19:45 BST | Olaniyan (yellow card) 10'; Csóka (yellow card) 80' | Report | Rak-Sakyi 57'; Rich-Baghuelou (yellow card) 62'; Kirby (yellow card) 65'; Street 83' | Stadium: Plough Lane; Attendance: 2,397; Referee: Sam Allison |

| 9 November 2021 Group game 3 | Sutton United | 1–0 | AFC Wimbledon | Sutton |
| 19:45 GMT | Wilson 47' | Report | Guinness-Walker (yellow card) 71' | Stadium: Borough Park; Attendance: 2,458; Referee: Neil Hair |

== Transfers ==
=== Transfers in ===
| Date | Position | Nationality | Name | From | Fee | Ref. |
|---|---|---|---|---|---|---|
| 1 July 2021 | CM | (England) | Charlie Morgan | (England) Queens Park Rangers | Undisclosed | |
| 2 July 2021 | CM | (England) | Luke McCormick | (England) Chelsea | Undisclosed | |
| 3 July 2021 | CB | (England) | Darius Charles | (England) Wycombe Wanderers | Free transfer | |
| 5 July 2021 | CF | (England) | Aaron Cosgrave | (England) Lewes | Free transfer | |
| 5 July 2021 | GK | (Algeria) | Zaki Oualah | (England) Leatherhead | Free transfer | |
| 6 July 2021 | DM | (England) | George Marsh | (England) Tottenham Hotspur | Free transfer | |
| 26 November 2021 | RW | (Albania) | Egli Kaja | Free agent | —N/a | |
| 28 January 2022 | LB | (England) | Lee Brown | (England) Portsmouth | Free transfer | |
| 31 January 2022 | GK | (England) | Nathan Broome | (England) Stoke City | Free transfer | |
| 19 March 2022 | CF | (France) | Derick Osei | (England) Oxford United | Free transfer | |

=== Loans in ===
| Date | Position | Nationality | Name | From | Fee | Ref. |
|---|---|---|---|---|---|---|
| 16 July 2021 | CF | (Scotland) | Aaron Pressley | (England) Brentford | End of season | |
| 26 July 2021 | RB | (England) | Henry Lawrence | (England) Chelsea | End of season | |
| 4 August 2021 | CF | (Scotland) | Dapo Mebude | (England) Watford | End of season | |
| 7 January 2022 | CF | (Finland) | Terry Ablade | (England) Fulham | End of season | |
| 14 January 2022 | AM | (Lithuania) | Tomas Kalinauskas | (England) Barnsley | End of season | |
| 31 January 2022 | CF | (England) | Sam Cosgrove | (England) Birmingham City | End of season | |

=== Loans out ===
| Date | Position | Nationality | Name | To | Fee | Ref. |
|---|---|---|---|---|---|---|
| 10 July 2021 | CF | (England) | Aaron Cosgrave | (England) Dover Athletic | 30 December 2021 | (Note: On 30 December, Cosgrave was recalled from his loan spell at Dover.) |
| 21 July 2021 | CF | (England) | Corie Andrews | (England) Aldershot Town | 3 January 2022 | |
| 30 July 2021 | LB | (England) | Jack Currie | (England) Eastbourne Borough | End of season | |
| 30 July 2021 | FW | (England) | David Fisher | (England) Hampton & Richmond Borough | End of season | |
| 13 August 2021 | MF | (England) | Dylan Adjei-Hersey | (England) Merstham | 16 January 2022 | |
| 13 August 2021 | RB | (England) | Huseyin Biler | (England) Welling United | End of season | |
| 13 August 2021 | CM | (England) | Elliott Bolton | (England) Corinthian Casuals | | |
| 16 August 2021 | CF | (England) | Zach Robinson | (England) Hemel Hempstead Town | | |
| 25 September 2021 | CF | (England) | Quaine Bartley | (England) Cray Wanderers | 23 October 2021 | |
| 16 December 2021 | CB | (England) | Luke Jenkins | (England) Tonbridge Angels | 16 January 2022 | |
| 3 January 2022 | CM | (England) | Kwaku Frimpong | (England) Carshalton Athletic | | |
| 3 January 2022 | LB | (England) | Josh Hallard | (England) Metropolitan Police | Work experience | |
| 7 January 2022 | MF | (England) | Isaac Olaniyan | (England) Chipstead | | |
| 7 January 2022 | CF | (England) | Zach Robinson | (England) Hampton & Richmond Borough | 6 February 2022 | |
| 8 January 2022 | CF | (England) | Corie Andrews | (England) Colchester United | End of season | |
| 5 February 2022 | CF | (England) | Quaine Bartley | (England) Potters Bar Town | March 2022 | |
| 5 February 2022 | CB | (England) | Isaac Ogundere | (England) Potters Bar Town | March 2022 | |
| 5 February 2022 | GK | (Algeria) | Zaki Oualah | (England) Billericay Town | End of season | |

=== Transfers out ===
| Date | Position | Nationality | Name | To | Fee | Ref. |
|---|---|---|---|---|---|---|
| 30 June 2021 | AM | (Republic of Ireland) | Shane McLoughlin | (England) Morecambe | Released | |
| 30 June 2021 | RB | (England) | Luke O'Neill | (England) Kettering Town | Released | |
| 30 June 2021 | CF | (England) | Joe Pigott | (England) Ipswich Town | Rejected contract | |
| 30 June 2021 | CB | (England) | Archie Procter | (England) Accrington Stanley | Undisclosed | |
| 30 June 2021 | CM | (Republic of Ireland) | Callum Reilly | (England) Leyton Orient | Released | |
| 22 July 2021 | GK | (England) | Matthew Cox | (England) Brentford | Undisclosed | |
| 11 August 2021 | CF | (England) | Shayon Harrison | (England) Morecambe | Free transfer | |
| 12 August 2021 | CB | (England) | Terell Thomas | (England) Crewe Alexandra | Free transfer | |
| 24 January 2022 | CF | (England) | Ollie Palmer | (Wales) Wrexham | Undisclosed | |

== Statistics ==
As of match played 21 August 2021

| No. | Pos | Nat | Player | Total | | League One | | FA Cup | | EFL Cup | | EFL Trophy | |
| No. | Pos | Nat | Player | Apps | Goals | Apps | Goals | Apps | Goals | Apps | Goals | Apps | Goals |
|---|---|---|---|---|---|---|---|---|---|---|---|---|---|
| 1 | GK | (New Zealand) NZL | Nik Tzanev | 5 | 0 | 4+0 | 0 | 0+0 | 0 | 1+0 | 0 | 0+0 | 0 |
| 2 | DF | (England) ENG | Henry Lawrence | 4 | 0 | 2+1 | 0 | 0+0 | 0 | 1+0 | 0 | 0+0 | 0 |
| 3 | DF | (Hungary) HUN | Dániel Csóka | 2 | 0 | 1+0 | 0 | 0+0 | 0 | 1+0 | 0 | 0+0 | 0 |
| 4 | MF | (England) ENG | Alex Woodyard | 4 | 0 | 4+0 | 0 | 0+0 | 0 | 0+0 | 0 | 0+0 | 0 |
| 5 | DF | (England) ENG | Will Nightingale | 4 | 1 | 4+0 | 1 | 0+0 | 0 | 0+0 | 0 | 0+0 | 0 |
| 6 | MF | (England) ENG | George Marsh | 3 | 0 | 1+1 | 0 | 0+0 | 0 | 1+0 | 0 | 0+0 | 0 |
| 7 | DF | (England) ENG | Cheye Alexander | 4 | 0 | 3+0 | 0 | 0+0 | 0 | 0+1 | 0 | 0+0 | 0 |
| 8 | MF | (England) ENG | Anthony Hartigan | 4 | 0 | 3+0 | 0 | 0+0 | 0 | 1+0 | 0 | 0+0 | 0 |
| 9 | FW | (England) ENG | Ollie Palmer | 5 | 1 | 3+1 | 1 | 0+0 | 0 | 0+1 | 0 | 0+0 | 0 |
| 10 | FW | (England) ENG | Ayoub Assal | 5 | 1 | 4+0 | 1 | 0+0 | 0 | 0+1 | 0 | 0+0 | 0 |
| 11 | MF | (South Africa) RSA | Ethan Chislett | 4 | 0 | 1+2 | 0 | 0+0 | 0 | 1+0 | 0 | 0+0 | 0 |
| 12 | MF | (England) ENG | Jack Rudoni | 4 | 0 | 2+1 | 0 | 0+0 | 0 | 0+1 | 0 | 0+0 | 0 |
| 14 | FW | (England) ENG | Zach Robinson | 0 | 0 | 0+0 | 0 | 0+0 | 0 | 0+0 | 0 | 0+0 | 0 |
| 15 | DF | (Wales) WAL | Jack Madelin | 0 | 0 | 0+0 | 0 | 0+0 | 0 | 0+0 | 0 | 0+0 | 0 |
| 16 | FW | (Scotland) SCO | Dapo Mebude | 4 | 1 | 1+2 | 1 | 0+0 | 0 | 1+0 | 0 | 0+0 | 0 |
| 18 | DF | (England) ENG | Nesta Guinness-Walker | 2 | 0 | 2+0 | 0 | 0+0 | 0 | 0+0 | 0 | 0+0 | 0 |
| 19 | FW | (Scotland) SCO | Aaron Pressley | 5 | 1 | 1+3 | 1 | 0+0 | 0 | 1+0 | 0 | 0+0 | 0 |
| 20 | DF | (England) ENG | Huseyin Biler | 0 | 0 | 0+0 | 0 | 0+0 | 0 | 0+0 | 0 | 0+0 | 0 |
| 21 | MF | (England) ENG | Luke McCormick | 4 | 1 | 3+1 | 1 | 0+0 | 0 | 0+0 | 0 | 0+0 | 0 |
| 22 | DF | (England) ENG | Ben Heneghan | 4 | 0 | 3+0 | 0 | 0+0 | 0 | 1+0 | 0 | 0+0 | 0 |
| 23 | MF | (England) ENG | Elliott Bolton | 0 | 0 | 0+0 | 0 | 0+0 | 0 | 0+0 | 0 | 0+0 | 0 |
| 24 | MF | (England) ENG | Alfie Bendle | 0 | 0 | 0+0 | 0 | 0+0 | 0 | 0+0 | 0 | 0+0 | 0 |
| 27 | MF | (England) ENG | Dylan Adjei-Hersey | 0 | 0 | 0+0 | 0 | 0+0 | 0 | 0+0 | 0 | 0+0 | 0 |
| 30 | DF | (England) ENG | Paul Kalambayi | 2 | 0 | 1+0 | 0 | 0+0 | 0 | 1+0 | 0 | 0+0 | 0 |
| 31 | GK | (Algeria) ALG | Zaki Oualah | 0 | 0 | 0+0 | 0 | 0+0 | 0 | 0+0 | 0 | 0+0 | 0 |
| 32 | DF | (England) ENG | Darius Charles | 0 | 0 | 0+0 | 0 | 0+0 | 0 | 0+0 | 0 | 0+0 | 0 |
| 35 | DF | (England) ENG | Ethan Sutcliffe | 0 | 0 | 0+0 | 0 | 0+0 | 0 | 0+0 | 0 | 0+0 | 0 |
| 36 | DF | (England) ENG | Luke Jenkins | 0 | 0 | 0+0 | 0 | 0+0 | 0 | 0+0 | 0 | 0+0 | 0 |
| 37 | DF | (England) ENG | Paul Osew | 2 | 1 | 1+0 | 0 | 0+0 | 0 | 1+0 | 1 | 0+0 | 0 |

=== Goals record ===
As of match played 21 August 2021

| Rank | No. | Nat. | Po. | Name | League One | FA Cup | EFL Cup | EFL Trophy | Total |
|---|---|---|---|---|---|---|---|---|---|
| 1 | 5 | (England) | DF | Will Nightingale | 1 | 0 | 0 | 0 | 1 |
| 1 | 9 | (England) | FW | Ollie Palmer | 1 | 0 | 0 | 0 | 1 |
| 1 | 10 | (England) | MF | Ayoub Assal | 1 | 0 | 0 | 0 | 1 |
| 1 | 16 | (Scotland) | FW | Dapo Mebude | 1 | 0 | 0 | 0 | 1 |
| 1 | 19 | (Scotland) | FW | Aaron Pressley | 1 | 0 | 0 | 0 | 1 |
| 1 | 21 | (England) | MF | Luke McCormick | 1 | 0 | 0 | 0 | 1 |
| 1 | 37 | (England) | DF | Paul Osew | 0 | 0 | 1 | 0 | 0 |
| Own Goals | | | | | 0 | 0 | 0 | 0 | 0 |
| Total | | | | | 6 | 0 | 1 | 0 | 7 |

=== Disciplinary record ===
As of match played 21 August 2021

| Rank | No. | Nat. | Po. | Name | League One | | | FA Cup | | | EFL Cup | | | EFL Trophy | | | Total | | |
| Rank | No. | Nat. | Po. | Name | Booked | (yellow card) (yellow-red card) | Sent off (straight red) | Booked | (yellow card) (yellow-red card) | Sent off (straight red) | Booked | (yellow card) (yellow-red card) | Sent off (straight red) | Booked | (yellow card) (yellow-red card) | Sent off (straight red) | Booked | (yellow card) (yellow-red card) | Sent off (straight red) |
|---|---|---|---|---|---|---|---|---|---|---|---|---|---|---|---|---|---|---|---|
| 1 | 10 | (England) | MF | Ayoub Assal | 3 | 0 | 0 | 0 | 0 | 0 | 0 | 0 | 0 | 0 | 0 | 0 | 3 | 0 | 0 |
| 2 | 18 | (England) | DF | Nesta Guinness-Walker | 2 | 0 | 0 | 0 | 0 | 0 | 0 | 0 | 0 | 0 | 0 | 0 | 2 | 0 | 0 |
| 3 | 1 | (New Zealand) | GK | Nik Tzanev | 1 | 0 | 0 | 0 | 0 | 0 | 0 | 0 | 0 | 0 | 0 | 0 | 1 | 0 | 0 |
| 3 | 5 | (England) | DF | Will Nightingale | 1 | 0 | 0 | 0 | 0 | 0 | 0 | 0 | 0 | 0 | 0 | 0 | 1 | 0 | 0 |
| 3 | 6 | (England) | MF | George Marsh | 0 | 0 | 0 | 0 | 0 | 0 | 1 | 0 | 0 | 0 | 0 | 0 | 1 | 0 | 0 |
| 3 | 8 | (England) | MF | Anthony Hartigan | 1 | 0 | 0 | 0 | 0 | 0 | 0 | 0 | 0 | 0 | 0 | 0 | 1 | 0 | 0 |
| 3 | 9 | (England) | FW | Ollie Palmer | 1 | 0 | 0 | 0 | 0 | 0 | 0 | 0 | 0 | 0 | 0 | 0 | 1 | 0 | 0 |
| 3 | 16 | (Scotland) | FW | Dapo Mebude | 1 | 0 | 0 | 0 | 0 | 0 | 0 | 0 | 0 | 0 | 0 | 0 | 1 | 0 | 0 |
| 3 | 21 | (England) | MF | Luke McCormick | 1 | 0 | 0 | 0 | 0 | 0 | 0 | 0 | 0 | 0 | 0 | 0 | 1 | 0 | 0 |
| 3 | 22 | (England) | DF | Ben Heneghan | 1 | 0 | 0 | 0 | 0 | 0 | 0 | 0 | 0 | 0 | 0 | 0 | 1 | 0 | 0 |
| Total | | | | | 12 | 0 | 0 | 0 | 0 | 0 | 1 | 0 | 0 | 0 | 0 | 0 | 13 | 0 | 0 |
