= Aaron Cosgrave =

English footballer

Personal information
- Full name: Aaron Haruna Omar Martin Cosgrave
- Date of birth: 17 July 1999 (age 27)
- Place of birth: Shenfield, England
- Position: Forward

Team information
- Current team: Folkestone Invicta

Youth career
- West Ham United
- Colchester United

Senior career*
Years	Team	Apps	(Gls)
2017–2018	Coggeshall Town	37	(12)
2018–2019	Havant & Waterlooville	15	(1)
2019	Chelmsford City	13	(0)
2019–2020	Welling United	27	(1)
2020–2021	Lewes	14	(5)
2021–2023	AFC Wimbledon	9	(1)
2021	→ Dover Athletic (loan)	19	(4)
2022–2023	→ Southend United (loan)	10	(0)
2023	→ King's Lynn Town (loan)	20	(6)
2023–2024	FC Halifax Town	40	(4)
2024	→ Ebbsfleet United (loan)	9	(2)
2024–2026	Ebbsfleet United	66	(11)
2026–	Folkestone Invicta	0	(0)
- * Club domestic league appearances and goals as of 12:48, 29 May 2026 (UTC)

Aaron Haruna Omar Martin Cosgrave (born 17 July 1999) is an English professional footballer who plays as a forward for National League South club Folkestone Invicta.

== Career ==
Cosgrave began his career in the academies at West Ham United and Colchester United. In 2017, Cosgrave signed for Eastern Counties League club Coggeshall Town. Cosgrave scored 12 goals in 37 league appearances during the 2017–18 season as Coggeshall won the league and gained promotion to the Isthmian League North Division.

Ahead of the 2018–19 season, following a trial with Tranmere Rovers, Cosgrave signed for National League side Havant & Waterlooville. During his time at the club, Cosgrave made 15 league appearances, starting five times, scoring once. In January 2019, Cosgrave dropped a division, signing for National League South club Chelmsford City. Cosgrave made 13 league appearances without scoring for Chelmsford and subsequently moved on to Welling United ahead of the 2019–20 season. At Welling, Cosgrave made 32 appearances in all competitions, scoring once, before signing for Isthmian League outfit Lewes in February 2020. Cosgrave scored five goals in 14 league appearances for Lewes over two campaigns disrupted by the COVID-19 pandemic.

In July 2021, Cosgrave joined AFC Wimbledon after impressing on trial. Later that month he moved on loan to Dover Athletic. Cosgrave made his debut on the opening day of the season as Dover, starting the season on minus 12 points, lost 2–0 at Maidenhead United. His first goal for the club came in his third appearance as he gave Dover a 2–1 lead in an eventual 3–2 defeat to Altrincham. He returned to Wimbledon to make his debut for the club in the EFL Trophy on 9 November 2021, before returning to Dover a few days later. On 30 December 2021, Cosgrave was recalled from his loan spell.

In August 2022 he moved on loan to Southend United. He moved on loan to King's Lynn Town in January 2023. He was released by Wimbledon at the end of the 2022–23 season.

In July 2023 he signed for FC Halifax Town.

In October 2024, he joined fellow National League side Ebbsfleet United on an initial one-month loan, before making the move permanently on 19 December 2024.

On 29 May 2026, Cosgrave joined newly promoted National League South club Folkestone Invicta.

== Career statistics ==
As of 19 December 2024

Appearances and goals by club, season and competition
Club	Season	League			FA Cup		League Cup (Note: Includes appearances in National League Cup)		Other		Total	
Club	Season	Division	Apps	Goals	Apps	Goals	Apps	Goals	Apps	Goals	Apps	Goals
Havant & Waterlooville	2018–19	National League	15	1	1	0	—		0	0	16	1
Chelmsford City	2018–19	National League South	13	0	0	0	—		0	0	13	0
Welling United	2019–20	National League South	27	1	3	0	—		1 (Note: Appearance(s) in FA Trophy)	0	31	1
Lewes	2019–20	Isthmian Premier Division	6	1	—		—		0	0	6	1
Lewes	2020–21	Isthmian Premier Division	8	4	1	1	—		1	0	10	5
Lewes	Total		14	5	1	1	0	0	1	0	16	6
AFC Wimbledon	2021–22	League One	9	1	0	0	0	0	1 (Note: Appearance(s) in EFL Trophy)	0	10	1
AFC Wimbledon	2022–23	League Two	0	0	0	0	0	0	0	0	0	0
AFC Wimbledon	Total		9	1	0	0	0	0	1	0	10	1
Dover Athletic (loan)	2021–22	National League	19	4	2	0	—		1	0	22	4
Southend United (loan)	2022–23	National League	10	0	0	0	—		1	0	11	0
King's Lynn Town (loan)	2022–23	National League North	20	6	0	0	—		0	0	20	6
FC Halifax Town	2023–24	National League	35	4	1	0	—		1	0	37	4
FC Halifax Town	2024–25	National League	5	0	1	0	1	0	0	0	7	0
FC Halifax Town	Total		40	4	2	0	1	0	1	0	44	4
Ebbsfleet United (loan)	2024–25	National League	9	2	0	0	—		1	1	10	3
Career total			176	24	9	1	1	0	7	1	193	26
