= Jack Rudoni =

English footballer (born 2001)

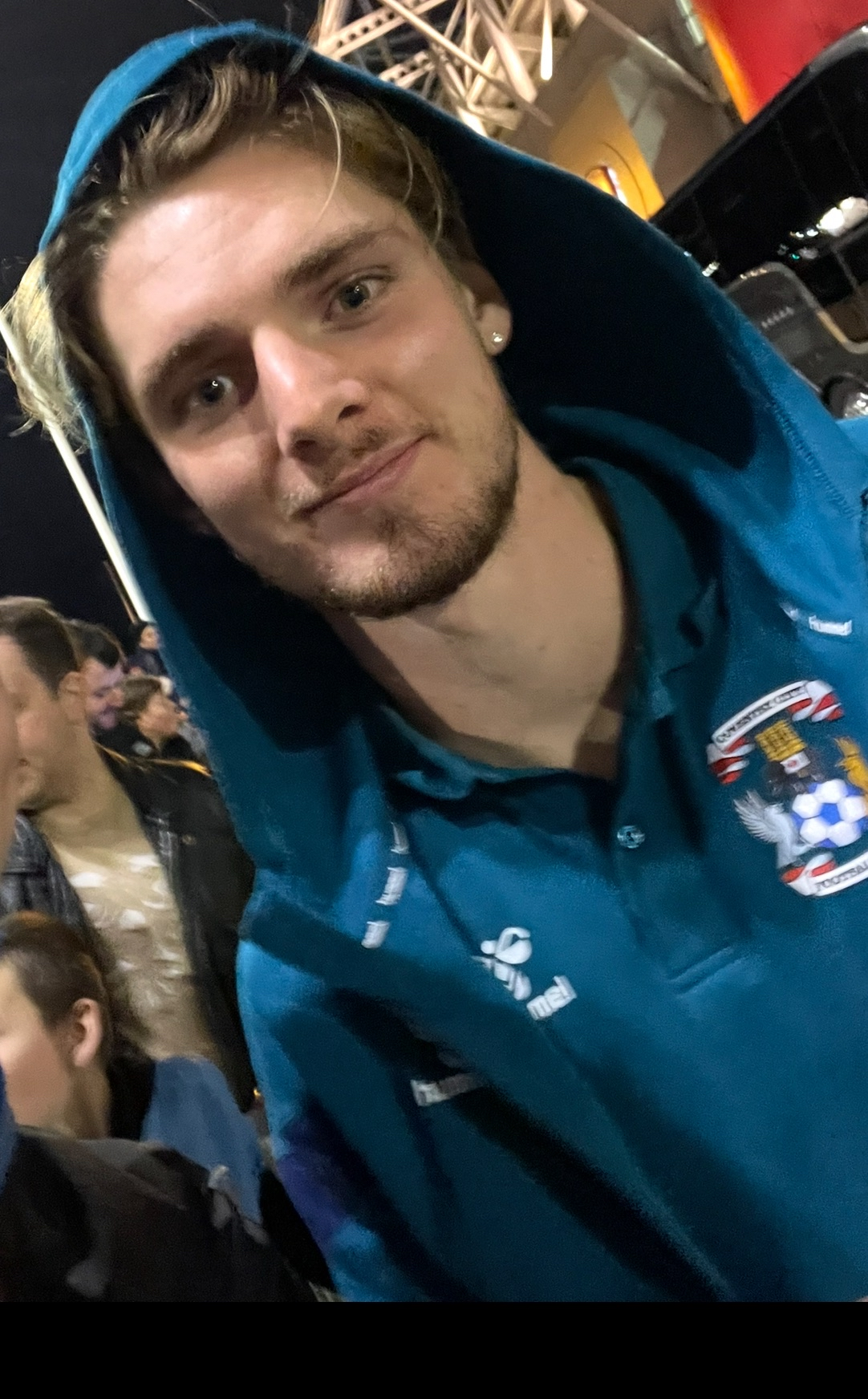
- Rudoni in 2024

Personal information
- Full name: Jack Edward Rudoni
- Date of birth: 14 June 2001 (age 25)
- Place of birth: Carshalton, England
- Height: 6 ft 1 in (1.86 m)
- Position: Midfielder

Team information
- Current team: Coventry City
- Number: 5

Youth career
- Epsom Eagles
- 2010–2011: Crystal Palace
- 2011–2019: AFC Wimbledon

Senior career*
Years	Team	Apps	(Gls)
2019–2022	AFC Wimbledon	91	(16)
2019	→ Corinthian-Casuals (loan)	5	(0)
2019	→ Tonbridge Angels (loan)	4	(0)
2022–2024	Huddersfield Town	80	(7)
2024–	Coventry City	84	(19)
- * Club domestic league appearances and goals as of 22:33, 31 October 2026 (UTC)

Jack Edward Rudoni (born 14 June 2001) is an English professional footballer who plays as a midfielder for Premier League club Coventry City.

== Club career ==
=== AFC Wimbledon ===
After being released by Crystal Palace at the age of 11, Rudoni signed for AFC Wimbledon.

On 21 March 2019, he signed his first professional contract with AFC Wimbledon. He scored his first goal for Wimbledon in an EFL Trophy tie against Bristol Rovers on 12 January 2021.

=== Huddersfield Town ===
On 15 July 2022, Rudoni signed for EFL Championship club Huddersfield Town for an undisclosed fee, signing a four-year contract. He made his debut for the club on the opening matchday of the 2022–23 season, replacing Josh Koroma in the 56th minute of a 1–0 loss to Burnley. The following week he made his first start for Huddersfield in a 2–1 away defeat at St Andrew's against Birmingham City.

He scored his first league goal for Huddersfield in a 3–2 away win at Watford on 7 April 2023.

=== Coventry City ===
On 20 June 2024, Rudoni joined Coventry City for an undisclosed fee signing a four-year deal. On 5 October, he scored his first goal for Coventry City in a 2–1 home defeat to Sheffield Wednesday.

On 12 October 2026, Rudoni scored the first Premier League goal of his career from a penalty against Newcastle United.

== Career statistics ==
As of match played 21 November 2026

Appearances and goals by club, season and competition
Club	Season	League			FA Cup		EFL Cup		Other		Total	
Club	Season	Division	Apps	Goals	Apps	Goals	Apps	Goals	Apps	Goals	Apps	Goals
AFC Wimbledon	2019–20	League One	11	0	0	0	0	0	2 (Note: Appearances in EFL Trophy)	0	13	0
AFC Wimbledon	2020–21	League One	39	4	2	0	0	0	3	1	44	5
AFC Wimbledon	2021–22	League One	41	12	3	0	3	0	2	0	49	12
AFC Wimbledon	Total		91	16	5	0	3	0	7	1	106	17
Huddersfield Town	2022–23	Championship	46	2	1	0	1	0	—		48	2
Huddersfield Town	2023–24	Championship	34	5	0	0	1	0	—		35	5
Huddersfield Town	Total		80	7	1	0	2	0	—		83	7
Coventry City	2024–25	Championship	43	9	2	0	3	0	2 (Note: Appearances in EFL Championship play-offs)	1	50	10
Coventry City	2025–26	Championship	30	7	1	0	2	0	—		33	7
Coventry City	2026–27	Premier League	11	3	0	0	1	1	—		12	4
Coventry City	Total		84	19	3	0	6	1	2	1	95	21
Career total			255	42	9	0	11	1	9	2	284	45

== Honours ==
Coventry City

- EFL Championship: 2025–26

Individual

- AFC Wimbledon Player of the Year: 2021–22
- PFA Team of the Year: 2025–26 Championship
