= Corie Andrews =

English footballer (born 1997)

Personal information
- Full name: Corie Anthony Andrews
- Date of birth: 20 September 1997 (age 29)
- Place of birth: Lambeth, England
- Position: Forward

Team information
- Current team: Dover Athletic
- Number: 18

Youth career
- –2015: Crystal Palace

Senior career*
Years	Team	Apps	(Gls)
2015–2017	Crystal Palace	0	(0)
2016	→ Margate (loan)	4	(0)
2017	→ Kingstonian (loan)	1	(0)
2019–2020	Whyteleafe	25	(2)
2020–2021	Kingstonian	9	(5)
2021–2022	AFC Wimbledon	0	(0)
2021–2022	→ Aldershot Town (loan)	20	(9)
2022	→ Colchester United (loan)	11	(1)
2022–2023	Torquay United	12	(0)
2023–2024	Wealdstone	37	(4)
2024–2025	Oxford City	33	(9)
2025–2026	Maidenhead United	15	(0)
2026	→ Enfield Town (loan)	19	(1)
2026–	Dover Athletic	1	(1)
- * Club domestic league appearances and goals as of 07:47, 26 August 2026 (UTC)

Corie Anthony Andrews (born 20 September 1997) is an English professional footballer who plays as a forward for Dover Athletic.

== Career ==
Born in London, Andrews began his career with Crystal Palace, turning professional with them at the age of 17. He spent time on loan with Margate and Kingstonian. He was released by Crystal Palace at the end of the 2016–17 season.

He spent the 2019–20 season with Whyteleafe, making 36 competitive appearances.

He signed permanently for Kingstonian in 2020, making 12 competitive appearances for them, before returning to professional football with AFC Wimbledon in January 2021. He moved on loan to Aldershot Town in July 2021, and to Colchester United in January 2022.

Having been released by AFC Wimbledon at the end of the 2021–22 season, Andrews joined National League club Torquay United in July 2022.

Andrews joined National League club Wealdstone in January 2023. He scored 3 goals in 17 games in his first season at the club. He scored once in an injury-hit second season at the club, netting a 99th minute equaliser in a 1–1 draw at Barnet. Andrews was released in May 2024.

In July 2024, Andrews joined National League North side Oxford City, reuniting with former Wealdstone manager Sam Cox. He scored 9 league goals for the club before being released at the end of the 2024–25 season.

Andrews joined Maidenhead United for the 2025–26 season. After a loan spell with Enfield Town, he left the club at the end of the season. Andrews signed for Dover Athletic on 22 August 2026.
