= Zaki Oualah =

Algerian footballer

Personal information
- Full name: Zaki Nazih Oualah
- Date of birth: 3 April 1995 (age 31)
- Place of birth: Reading, England
- Height: 1.80 m (5 ft 11 in)
- Position: Goalkeeper

Team information
- Current team: Kingstonian

Youth career
- Reading

Senior career*
Years	Team	Apps	(Gls)
- US Biskra
2012–2013	Uxbridge	9	(0)
2013–2014	Godalming Town	33	(0)
2014	Hungerford Town	1	(0)
2014	Harefield United	1	(0)
2014	Godalming Town	1	(0)
2014	Metropolitan Police	1	(0)
2014–2015	Leighton Town	18	(0)
2015	Burnham		
2015	Merstham	1	(0)
2015	Bedford Town	1	(0)
2015–2017	Aylesbury United	61	(0)
2017	Farnborough	7	(0)
2017–2018	Leatherhead	29	(0)
2018	Hayes & Yeading United	14	(0)
2018	Hendon	0	(0)
2018	Aldershot Town	0	(0)
2018	Hendon	0	(0)
2018–2021	Leatherhead	76	(0)
2021–2022	AFC Wimbledon	0	(0)
2022	→ Billericay Town (loan)	13	(0)
2022–2023	Weymouth	28	(0)
2023–2024	Chesham United	39	(0)
2024–2025	Whitehawk	2	(0)
2025	Farnham Town	26	(0)
2025–2026	Bracknell Town	37	(0)
2026–	Kingstonian	2	(0)
- * Club domestic league appearances and goals as of 13:52, 8 October 2026 (UTC)

Zaki Nazih Oualah (born 3 April 1995) is an English professional footballer who plays as a goalkeeper for Kingstonian.

== Career ==
During his youth career, Oualah played for hometown club Reading.

Oualah played for numerous English non-league clubs, including Hendon, Hayes & Yeading United, Farnborough, Aylesbury United, Bedford Town, Merstham, Burnham, Leighton Town, Godalming Town, Harefield United, Hungerford Town, Uxbridge, Metropolitan Police (making one appearance in October 2014) and Leatherhead during the formative years of his senior career. He signed a short-term deal with Aldershot Town in August 2018, and played for Hendon between June 2018 and September 2018.

He also played for Algerian club US Biskra.

He turned professional with AFC Wimbledon in July 2021, having spent seven seasons training with the club. On 7 September 2021, Oualah made his debut for Wimbledon, playing a 5–3 EFL Trophy win against Portsmouth. He moved on loan to Billericay Town on 5 February 2022, making his debut that same day.

He signed for Weymouth in October 2022. In May 2023 he announced that he was leaving the club.

In August 2023, Oualah signed for Chesham United, before joining Whitehawk in July 2024. He suffered a broken leg on his debut for the Hawks.

On 18 February 2025, Oualah joined Farnham Town following his recovery from his long-term injury.

On 22 October 2025, he signed for Bracknell Town. He left the club by mutual consent in September 2026.

On 2 October 2026, Oualah joined Kingstonian following his departure from Bracknell Town.

== Personal life ==
Born in Reading, England, Oualah is of Algerian descent.
