= George Marsh (footballer, born 1998) =

English footballer

Personal information
- Full name: George Owen Marsh
- Date of birth: 5 November 1998 (age 28)
- Place of birth: Pembury, England
- Height: 1.78 m (5 ft 10 in)
- Position: Midfielder

Team information
- Current team: Dagenham & Redbridge
- Number: 4

Youth career
- 2015–2018: Tottenham Hotspur

Senior career*
Years	Team	Apps	(Gls)
2018–2021	Tottenham Hotspur	3	(1)
2019–2020	→ Leyton Orient (loan)	26	(0)
2021–2023	AFC Wimbledon	52	(0)
2023–2024	AEL Limassol	26	(0)
2024–2025	Larne	6	(0)
2025–	Dagenham & Redbridge	30	(1)
- * Club domestic league appearances and goals as of 11:14, 13 November 2026 (UTC)

George Owen Marsh (born 5 November 1998) is an English professional footballer who plays as a defensive midfielder for National League South club Dagenham & Redbridge.

== Early and personal life ==
Marsh was born in Pembury, Kent, and raised in Hawkhurst, attending Robertsbridge Community College.

== Career ==
=== Tottenham Hotspur ===
Marsh joined the Tottenham Hotspur Academy in 2015. After making 6 appearances for the U21 team in the EFL Trophy in the 2017–18 and 2018–19 seasons, he made his senior debut on 4 January 2019 in the FA Cup against Tranmere Rovers. He extended his contract with Tottenham for two more years in June 2019.

On 19 August 2019, Marsh went on loan to Leyton Orient until January 2020. The deal was extended until the end of the 2019–20 season on 6 January 2020. Tottenham announced that Marsh would be released by the club at the end of the 2020–21 season.

=== AFC Wimbledon ===
On 6 July 2021, Marsh joined League One side AFC Wimbledon on a free transfer. March debut for the club occurred on the opening day of the season away against Doncaster Rovers which Wimbledon won 2–1. After 60 appearances in all competitions Marsh confirmed he was leaving Wimbledon upon the conclusion of the 2022-23 season.

=== AEL Limassol ===
In July 2023, Marsh joined Cypriot First Division side AEL Limassol on a two-year deal.

=== Larne ===
In August 2024 Larne of the NIFL Premiership in Northern Ireland reported they had signed March after he had departed AEL Limassol. He was assigned the shirt number 15.

=== Dagenham & Redbridge ===
In June 2025, Marsh returned to England, joining recently relegated National League South side Dagenham & Redbridge on a two-year deal.

== Playing style ==
Marsh has been described by Tottenham Hotspur as "a tenacious, tough-tackling holding midfielder who can also play in the back line".

== Career statistics ==
As of match played 29 August 2026

Appearances and goals by club, season and competition
Club	Season	League			National cup (Note: Includes FA Cup)		League cup (Note: Includes EFL Cup, Northern Ireland Football League Cup)		Europe		Other		Total	
Club	Season	Division	Apps	Goals	Apps	Goals	Apps	Goals	Apps	Goals	Apps	Goals	Apps	Goals
Tottenham Hotspur U21	2017–18	—			—		—		—		2 (Note: Appearance(s) in EFL Trophy)	0	2	0
Tottenham Hotspur U21	2018–19	—			—		—		—		4	0	4	0
Tottenham Hotspur U21	Total		—		—		—		—		6	0	6	0
Tottenham Hotspur	2018–19	Premier League	0	0	1	0	0	0	0	0	—		1	0
Leyton Orient (loan)	2019–20	League Two	26	0	0	0	—		—		3	0	29	0
AFC Wimbledon	2021–22	League One	27	0	1	0	2	0	—		1	0	31	0
AFC Wimbledon	2022–23	League Two	25	0	1	0	1	0	—		3	0	30	0
AFC Wimbledon	Total		52	0	2	0	3	0	—		4	0	61	0
AEL Limassol	2023–24	Cypriot First Division	26	0	0	0	—		—		—		26	0
Larne	2024–25	NIFL Premiership	6	0	0	0	1	0	1 (Note: Appearance(s) in UEFA Europa Conference League)	0	—		8	0
Dagenham & Redbridge	2025–26	National League South	26	1	0	0	—		—		2 (Note: Appearance(s) in FA Trophy)	0	28	1
Dagenham & Redbridge	2026–27	National League South	4	0	0	0	—		—		0	0	4	0
Dagenham & Redbridge	Total		30	1	0	0	—		—		2	0	32	1
Career total			140	1	3	0	4	0	1	0	15	0	163	1
