= 2026–27 AFC Wimbledon season =

25th season in existence of AFC Wimbledon

AFC Wimbledon
2026–27 season
- Owner: The Dons Trust
- Chairman: Mick Buckley
- Manager: Johnnie Jackson
- Stadium: Plough Lane
- League One: 17th
- FA Cup: First Round
- EFL Cup: Second Round
- EFL Trophy: Group Stage
- Top goalscorer: League: Jayden Stockley (6) All: Jayden Stockley (7)
- Highest home attendance: 8,334 vs Reading, League One, 22 August 2026
- Lowest home attendance: 3,766 vs Newport County, EFL Cup, 8 August 2026
- Biggest win: 2-0 vs Bromley (A), League One, 7 September 2026
- Biggest defeat: 0-5 vs Sheffield Wednesday (A), League One 17 October 2026

The 2026–27 season is the 25th season in the history of AFC Wimbledon and their second consecutive season in League One. In addition to the domestic league, the club would also participate in the FA Cup, the EFL Cup, and the EFL Trophy.

== Transfers and contracts ==
=== In ===
Date	Pos.	Player	From	Fee	Ref.
1 July 2026 (Note: The transfer was announced on 24 June, and would become official on July 1 once Nelson's contract at Luton Town expired.)	CAM	(England) Zack Nelson	(England) Luton Town	Free	
1 July 2026 (Note: The transfer was announced on 25 June, and would become official on July 1 once Sessegnon's contract at Wigan Athletic expired.)	RB	(England) Steven Sessegnon	(England) Wigan Athletic	Free	
1 July 2026 (Note: The transfer was announced on 23 June, and would become official on July 1 once Sweeney's contract at Stevenage expired.)	CB	(England) Dan Sweeney	(England) Stevenage	Free	
14 July 2026	RW	(England) James Tilley	(England) Wycombe Wanderers	Undisclosed	
5 August 2026	CF	(England) Jayden Stockley	(England) Port Vale	Free transfer	
17 August 2026	RB	(Ghana) Andy Yiadom	(England) Reading	Free	
25 August 2026	CF	(England) Harry Cornick	(England) Bristol City	Free	

=== Loaned in ===
Date	Pos.	Player	From	Date until	Ref.
31 July 2026	CM	(England) Ollie Harrison	(England) Chelsea	End of Season	
29 August 2026	FW	(England) Donnell McNeilly	(England) Nottingham Forest	End of Season	
1 September 2026	GK	(England) Josef Bursik	(England) Portsmouth	End of Season	
1 September 2026	CB	(England) Freddie Simmonds	(England) Brighton & Hove Albion	End of Season	
1 September 2026	FW	(Jamaica) Dujuan Richards	(England) Chelsea	End of Season	

=== Loaned out ===
Date	Pos.	Player	To	Loaned until	Ref.
7 July 2026	CM	(England) Harry Sidwell	(England) Eastleigh	End of Season	
8 August 2026	RW	(England) Ed Leach	(England) King's Lynn Town	5 September 2026	
17 August 2026	CDM	(England) Kai Jennings	(England) Crawley Town	End of Season	
20 August 2026	CM	(England) Jake Reeves	(England) Barnet	End of Season	
29 August 2026	CF	(England) Preston Kedwell	(England) Folkestone Invicta	26 September 2026	
19 September 2026	CAM	(England) Harry Hedges	(England) Horsham	17 October 2026	
14 November 2026	CM	(England) Joe Kirby	(England) Hanwell Town	3 January 2027	

=== Out ===
Date	Pos.	Player	To	Fee	Ref.
17 July 2026	CB	(England) Jaheim Scafe	(England) Bournemouth	Undisclosed	
17 July 2026	CM	(England) Amaari Sealey	(England) Crystal Palace	Undisclosed	
23 July 2026	RW	(England) Osman Foyo	(United States) Rhode Island	Undisclosed	
1 September 2026	CF	(England) Antwoine Hackford	(England) Swindon Town	Undisclosed	
1 September 2026	CF	(Spain) Junior Nkeng	(England) Charlton Athletic	Undisclosed	

=== Released / Out of Contract ===
Date	Pos.	Player	Subsequent club	Joined date	Ref.
30 June 2026	SS	(Northern Ireland) Josh Kelly	(England) Woking	1 July 2026	
30 June 2026	CB	(Germany) Patrick Bauer	(England) Cambridge United	3 July 2026	
30 June 2026	CF	(Lebanon) Omar Bugiel	(China) Suzhou Dongwu	3 July 2026	
30 June 2026	CDM	(England) Sam Hutchinson	(England) Farnham Town	21 July 2026	
30 June 2026	CB	(England) Ethan Sutcliffe			
30 June 2026	CB	(England) Leo Young			
30 June 2026	CB	(England) Joe Lewis	(England) Burton Albion	30 August 2026	

=== New Contract ===
Date	Pos.	Player	Contract until	Ref.
5 May 2026	LM	(Grenada) Myles Hippolyte	30 June 2027	
5 May 2026	CM	(England) Kai Jennings	30 June 2027	
5 May 2026	CM	(England) Jake Reeves	30 June 2027	
5 May 2026	LW	(England) Aron Sasu	30 June 2027	
29 June 2026	CDM	(England) Callum Maycock	30 June 2028	
30 June 2026	LB	(England) Steve Seddon	30 June 2027	
3 July 2026	CB	(England) Sam Goma-Weinberg	Undisclosed (Note: First professional contract)	
3 July 2026	CAM	(England) Harry Hedges	Undisclosed	
3 July 2026	CM	(England) Joe Kirby	Undisclosed	
7 July 2026	CM	(England) Harry Sidwell	30 June 2027 (Note: Option of a further year)	

== Pre-season and friendlies ==
On 11 May, Wimbledon announced they would once again travel to Marbella for a warm-weather training camp during pre-season between the 6–12 July. On there return to England, four fixtures were confirmed against Sutton United, Norwich City, Charlton Athletic and Wealdstone. On 10 June, a third home fixture was added to the schedule against Queens Park Rangers.

Win Draw Loss Fixtures

12 July 2026 Friendly	AFC Wimbledon	3–2	Coventry City	Marbella, Spain
13:00 CEST	Browne; Sasu; Hedges	Report	Bassette; van Ewijk	Stadium: Marbella Football Center; Attendance: 0 (BCD)

15 July 2026 Friendly	Brentford	3–2	AFC Wimbledon	Osterley
13:00 BST		Report	Sasu; Horan	Stadium: Brentford FC Training Ground; Attendance: 0 (BCD)

18 July 2026 Friendly	Sutton United	1–2	AFC Wimbledon	Sutton
15:00 BST	Babalola 57'	Report	Nelson 87'; Hippolyte 90' (pen.)	Stadium: VBS Community Stadium; Attendance: 1,305 (404 away)

22 July 2026 Friendly	AFC Wimbledon	0–0	Norwich City	Wimbledon
19:00 BST		Report		Stadium: Cherry Red Records Stadium; Attendance: 3,110 (1,409 away)

25 July 2026 Friendly	AFC Wimbledon	2–0	Charlton Athletic	Wimbledon
15:00 BST	Jennings 13'; Trialist B 50'	Report		Stadium: Cherry Red Records Stadium; Attendance: 2,528 (862 away)

28 July 2026 Friendly	Wealdstone	1–0	AFC Wimbledon	Ruislip
19:00 BST	Chesters 22'	Report		Stadium: Grosvenor Vale

1 August 2026 Friendly	AFC Wimbledon	2-3	Queens Park Rangers	Wimbledon
15:00 BST	Sasu 68', 71'	Report	Saito 22'; Scarlett 62'; Pearman 82'	Stadium: Cherry Red Records Stadium; Attendance: 4,249 (1,365 away)

2 October 2026 Friendly	Millwall	1–1	AFC Wimbledon	Bermondsey
13:00 BST		Report	Stockley	Stadium: The Den; Attendance: 0 (BCD)

== Competitions ==
=== League One ===
==== League table ====
Pos	Team	Pld	W	D	L	GF	GA	GD	Pts
16	Burton Albion	16	4	5	7	21	29	−8	17
17	Wigan Athletic	16	5	2	9	15	24	−9	17
18	AFC Wimbledon	15	4	4	7	11	25	−14	16
19	Notts County	13	3	5	5	13	15	−2	14
20	Doncaster Rovers	14	3	4	7	16	24	−8	13

Updated to match(es) played on 21 November 2026. Source: EFL Official Website
Rules for classification: 1) Points; 2) Goal difference; 3) Number of goals scored; 4) Head-to-head results; 5) Wins; 6) Away goals; 7) Penalty points (sec 9.5); 8) 12-point sending off offences

==== Results summary ====
Overall								Home						Away					
Pld	W	D	L	GF	GA	GD	Pts	W	D	L	GF	GA	GD	W	D	L	GF	GA	GD
14	4	4	6	10	21	−11	16	3	3	1	4	4	0	1	1	5	6	17	−11

Last updated: 14 November 2026.
Source: Soccerway

==== Results by round ====
Round	1	2	3	4	5	6	7	8	10	11	11	13	14	15	16	17	18	19	20	21	22	23	24	25	26	27	9^{1}
Ground	A	H	H	A	A	H	H	A	A	A	H	H	A	H	A	H	A	A	H	A	H	H	A	H	A	A	H
Result	L	D	W	L	W	W	D	D	L	L	L	D	L	W													
Position	24	23	14	17	15	7	7	8	12	15	16	16	18	17													
Points	0	1	4	4	7	10	11	12	12	12	12	13	13	16													

Source: EFL
A = Away; H = Home; W = Win; D = Draw; L = Loss; P = Postponed
Notes:
- ^{1} Matchday 9 (vs. Stevenage) was postponed due to international call-ups.

==== Matches ====
On 25 June, the League One fixtures were revealed.

Win Draw Loss Fixtures

15 August 2026 1	Huddersfield Town	3–0	AFC Wimbledon	Huddersfield
15:00 BST	Sanches Fernandes 4', 16', (yellow card) 49'; Mumba (red card) 29'; Radulović 78'	Report	Hippolyte (yellow card) 15'; Browne (yellow card) 74'	Stadium: Accu Stadium; Attendance: 16,182 (565 away); Referee: Scott Jackson

22 August 2026 2	AFC Wimbledon	0–0	Reading	Wimbledon
15:00 BST	Hippolyte (yellow card) 19'; Johnson (yellow card) 29'	Report	O'Connor (yellow card) 29'; Rinomhota (yellow card) 38'; Savage (yellow card) 68'	Stadium: The Cherry Red Records Stadium; Attendance: 8,334; Referee: Michael Barlow

30 August 2026 3	AFC Wimbledon	1–0	Wigan Athletic	Wimbledon
14:00 BST	Sessegnon (yellow card) 73'; Harrison (yellow card) 75'; Smith (yellow card) 77'; Hippolyte 88'; Seddon (yellow card) 90+6'	Report	Harris (yellow card) 21'; Mellish (yellow card) 25'; Weir (yellow card) 45+3'; Carragher (yellow card) 65'	Stadium: The Cherry Red Records Stadium; Attendance: 7,304; Referee: Andrew Humphries
Note: Fixture was initially scheduled for 29 August, but was rescheduled due to Second Round EFL Cup Fixture.

2 September 2026 4	Burton Albion	4–1	AFC Wimbledon	Burton upon Trent
19:45 BST	Evans 28'; Smith 34' (o.g.); Webster 46'; Vickers 76'; Armer (yellow card) 83'	Report	Stockley 18'; Yiadom (yellow card) 72'	Stadium: Pirelli Stadium; Attendance: 2,733; Referee: Declan Brown
Note: Fixture was initially scheduled for 1 September, but was rescheduled due to Second Round EFL Cup Fixture.

7 September 2026 5	Bromley	0–2	AFC Wimbledon	Bromley
20:00 BST	McKiernan (yellow card) 78'	Report	Hippolyte 8'; Sweeney (yellow card) 44'; Stockley 67'	Stadium: Copperjax Community Stadium; Attendance: 5,017; Referee: Lewis Sandoe
Note: Fixture was initially scheduled for 5 September, but was rescheduled for live Sky Sports.

12 September 2026 6	AFC Wimbledon	1–0	Doncaster Rovers	Wimbledon
15:00 BST	Stockley (yellow card) 27'; Hippolyte 43' (yellow card) 84'	Report	Aydine (yellow card) 31'; Bailey (yellow card) 76'; Simkin (yellow card) 90+4'	Stadium: The Cherry Red Records Stadium; Attendance: 7,426; Referee: Elliot Swallow

17 September 2026 7	AFC Wimbledon	0–0	Milton Keynes Dons	Wimbledon
20:00 BST	Johnson (yellow card) 30'	Report	Paterson (yellow card) 15'; Bramall (yellow card) 56'	Stadium: The Cherry Red Records Stadium; Attendance: 7,960; Referee: Richard Eley
Note: Fixture was initially scheduled for 19 September, but was rescheduled for live Sky Sports.

26 September 2026 8	Cambridge United	1–1	AFC Wimbledon	Cambridge
15:00 BST	Mpanzu (yellow card) 59'; Watts (yellow card) 62'; Bradshaw 90+1'	Report	Stockley 30'; Yiadom (yellow card) 52'; Seddon (yellow card) 90+5'	Stadium: Cledara Abbey Stadium; Attendance: 7,819; Referee: Ben Toner

10 October 2026 10	Plymouth Argyle	2–1	AFC Wimbledon	Plymouth
12:30 BST	Watts 25'; Amaechi 90+5', (yellow card) 90+7'	Report	Stockley 16'	Stadium: Home Park; Attendance: 15,277 (481 away); Referee: Stephen Parkinson
Note: Fixture was initially scheduled for a 15:00 kick-off, but was brought forward for live Sky Sports broadcasting.

17 October 2026 11	Sheffield Wednesday	5–0	AFC Wimbledon	Owlerton
15:00 BST	Bannan 38'; Keillor-Dunn 39', 85'; Gray 45'; James (yellow card) 49'; Slattery 56'; Heskey (yellow card) 60'	Report	Yiadom (yellow card) 70'	Stadium: Hillsborough; Attendance: 30,477; Referee: Emily Heaslip

20 October 2026 12	AFC Wimbledon	0–3	Mansfield Town	Wimbledon
19:45 BST	Yiadom (yellow card) 45+1'; Johnson (yellow card) 69'	Report	Smith 22', 27'; Oshilaja (yellow card) 42'; Russell 73'	Stadium: The Cherry Red Records Stadium; Attendance: 7,262; Referee: Ross Martin

24 October 2026 13	AFC Wimbledon	1–1	Wycombe Wanderers	Wimbledon
15:00 BST	Stockley 29'; Seddon (yellow card) 67'	Report	Onyedinma 60'	Stadium: The Cherry Red Records Stadium; Attendance: 8,069; Referee: Craig Hicks

31 October 2026 14	Stockport County	2–1	AFC Wimbledon	Edgeley
15:00 GMT	O'Connell (yellow card) 60'; Diamond 64'; Ennis 74'	Report	Stockley 47', (yellow card) 75'	Stadium: Edgeley Park; Attendance: 8,737; Referee: Dean Whitestone

14 November 2026 15	AFC Wimbledon	1–0	Blackpool	Wimbledon
15:00 GMT	Smith 13', (yellow card) 87'; Tilley (yellow card) 72'; Stockley (yellow card) 90+4'	Report	Morgan (yellow card) 83'; Yates (yellow card) 90+3'	Stadium: Cherry Red Records Stadium; Attendance: 8,332 (607 away); Referee: Oliver Mackey

21 November 2026 16	Leyton Orient	4–1	AFC Wimbledon	Leyton
15:00 GMT	Ogundere 24' (o.g.); Scarlett 30'; Dobra 42', (yellow card) 65'; Gilbert 72', (yellow card) 90+5'	Report	Cornick 63'; Nelson (yellow card) 76'; Browne (yellow card) 90+5'	Stadium: BetWright Stadium; Attendance: 8,543; Referee: Isaac Searle

28 November 2026 17	AFC Wimbledon	v	Barnsley	Wimbledon
15:00 GMT				Stadium: The Cherry Red Records Stadium

1 December 2026 18	Notts County	v	AFC Wimbledon	Nottingham
19:45 GMT				Stadium: Meadow Lane

12 December 2026 19	Bradford City	v	AFC Wimbledon	Bradford
15:00 GMT				Stadium: Mbanq Valley Parade

19 December 2026 20	AFC Wimbledon	v	Oxford United	Wimbledon
15:00 GMT				Stadium: The Cherry Red Records Stadium

26 December 2026 21	Leicester City	v	AFC Wimbledon	Leicester
15:00 GMT				Stadium: King Power Stadium

29 December 2026 22	AFC Wimbledon	v	Luton Town	Wimbledon
19:45 GMT				Stadium: The Cherry Red Records Stadium

1 January 2027 23	AFC Wimbledon	v	Peterborough United	Wimbledon
15:00 GMT				Stadium: The Cherry Red Records Stadium

9 January 2027 24	Oxford United	v	AFC Wimbledon	Littlemore
12:30 GMT				Stadium: The Kassam Stadium
Note: Fixture was initially scheduled for a 15:00 kick-off, but was brought forward for live Sky Sports broadcasting.

16 January 2027 25	AFC Wimbledon	v	Sheffield Wednesday	Wimbledon
15:00 GMT				Stadium: Cherry Red Records Stadium

19 January 2027 26	Mansfield Town	v	AFC Wimbledon	Mansfield
19:45 GMT				Stadium: One Call Stadium

23 January 2027 27	Wycombe Wanderers	v	AFC Wimbledon	High Wycombe
15:00 GMT				Stadium: Adams Park

26 January 2027 9	AFC Wimbledon	v	Stevenage	Wimbledon
19:45 GMT				Stadium: The Cherry Red Records Stadium
Note: Fixture was originally scheduled for 3 October, but was postponed and later rearranged for 26 January due to international call-ups in the Stevenage squad.

=== FA Cup ===
Wimbledon were drawn away to Crewe Alexandra in the first round.

Win Draw Loss Fixtures

7 November 2026 First round	Crewe Alexandra	2–1	AFC Wimbledon	Crewe
15:00 GMT	McNeill 12'; Gibson (yellow card) 18'; Thomas 62'; Hutchinson (yellow card) 70'; White (yellow card) 78'; Thibaut (yellow card) 89'; Billington (yellow card) 90+1'	Report	Smith (yellow card) 61'; Yiadom 82'	Stadium: Mornflake Stadium; Attendance: 3,015 (347 away); Referee: Matthew Donohue

=== EFL Cup ===
Wimbledon were drawn at home to Newport County in the first round and away to Fulham in the second round.

Win Draw Loss Fixtures

8 August 2026 First round	AFC Wimbledon	1–1 (5-4 p)	Newport County	Wimbledon
15:00 BST	Maycock 90+8'; Sweeney (yellow card) 16'; Hippolyte (yellow card) 64'	Report	Bamba 71'; Alexander-Walker (yellow card) 78'	Stadium: Plough Lane; Attendance: 3,766 (373 away); Referee: Paul Howard
	Penalties
	Browne (penalty scored); Stockley (penalty scored); Tilley (penalty scored); Hippolyte (penalty scored); Seddon (penalty scored)		(penalty scored) Garner; (penalty scored) Norman; (penalty scored) Brennan; (penalty scored) Biggins; (penalty missed) Smith

27 August 2026 Second round	Fulham	3–0	AFC Wimbledon	Fulham
20:00 BST	Rowe 37'; Muniz 42'; Tete (yellow card) 48'; García 90+3'		Nelson (yellow card) 82'	Stadium: Craven Cottage; Attendance: Anthony Backhouse; Referee: 17,714

=== EFL Trophy ===
==== Group stage ====
AFC Wimbledon were drawn against Barnet, Leyton Orient and Arsenal U21 in the Southern Group F.

Pos	Div	Team	Pld	W	PW	PL	L	GF	GA	GD	Pts	Qualification
1	L2	Barnet	3	2	1	0	0	9	3	+6	8	Advance to Round 2
2	ACA	Arsenal U21	3	2	0	0	1	5	7	−2	6	Advance to Round 2
3	L1	AFC Wimbledon	3	0	0	2	1	2	3	−1	2	
4	L1	Leyton Orient	3	0	1	0	2	4	7	−3	2	

Source: EFL

Win Draw Loss Fixtures

18 August 2026 Group stage	Leyton Orient	1–1 (6–5 p)	AFC Wimbledon	Leyton
19:00 BST	Obiero (yellow card) 51'; Levitt (yellow card) 67'; Gilchrist (yellow card) 73'; Kabia 89'	Report	Stockley 25'; Sweeney (yellow card) 76'	Stadium: BetWright Stadium; Attendance: 1,773 (272 away); Referee: Kirsty Dowle
	Penalties
	Kabia (penalty scored); Springett (penalty scored); Chinedu (penalty scored); Wellens (penalty scored); Akhamrich (penalty scored); Forrester (penalty scored)		Sasu (penalty scored); Smith (penalty scored); Hippolyte (penalty scored); Seddon (penalty scored); Tilley (penalty scored); Ogundere (penalty missed)

6 October 2026 Group stage	AFC Wimbledon	0–0 (7–8 p)	Barnet	Wimbledon
19:00 BST	Seddon (yellow card) 23'; Yiadom (yellow card) 62'; Smith (red card) 77'	Report	Liwala-Lukizalamu (yellow card) 23'; Willams (yellow card) 77'	Stadium: The Cherry Red Records Stadium; Attendance: 1,363 (309 away); Referee: Callum Winchester
	Penalties
	Nelson (penalty scored); Seddon (penalty scored); Harrison (penalty scored); Ogundere (penalty scored); Hedges (penalty scored); Kirby (penalty scored); Horan (penalty missed); Leach (penalty scored); Goma (penalty missed)		Willams (penalty scored); Maskell (penalty scored); Kanu (penalty scored); Noel-Williams (penalty scored); Ajayi (penalty scored); Kenlock (penalty scored); Knowles (penalty missed); Ofoborh (penalty scored); Crichlow (penalty scored)

27 October 2026 Group stage	AFC Wimbledon	1–2	Arsenal U21	Wimbledon
18:00 GMT	Nelson (yellow card) 29'; Maycock 48'	Report	Murisa (yellow card) 36'; Mooney 72'; Ogunnaike (yellow card) 78'; Nwaneri 87'	Stadium: The Cherry Red Records Stadium; Attendance: 3,050 (102 away); Referee: James Durkin
Note: Fixture was initially scheduled for a 19:00 kick-off, but was brought forward an hour following a request to maximise the opportunities for families to attend.

== Statistics ==
=== Appearances and goals ===
As of match played 14 November 2026

Players with no appearances are not included on the list; italics indicated loaned in player

No.	Pos	Nat	Player	Total		League One		FA Cup		EFL Cup		EFL Trophy	
No.	Pos	Nat	Player	Apps	Goals	Apps	Goals	Apps	Goals	Apps	Goals	Apps	Goals
1	GK	(England) ENG	Nathan Bishop	5	0	2+0	0	0+0	0	2+0	0	1+0	0
2	DF	(England) ENG	Steven Sessegnon	18	0	4+9	0	1+0	0	1+1	0	2+0	0
3	DF	(England) ENG	Steve Seddon	18	0	13+0	0	1+0	0	2+0	0	2+0	0
5	MF	(England) ENG	Ollie Harrison	17	0	9+3	0	1+0	0	1+0	0	3+0	0
6	DF	(Northern Ireland) NIR	Ryan Johnson	15	0	12+0	0	1+0	0	1+0	0	0+1	0
7	FW	(England) ENG	James Tilley	14	0	8+2	0	1+0	0	2+0	0	1+0	0
8	MF	(England) ENG	Callum Maycock	19	2	7+6	0	0+1	0	1+1	1	3+0	1
9	FW	(England) ENG	Jayden Stockley	18	7	13+1	6	1+0	0	0+2	0	1+0	1
10	FW	(England) ENG	Zack Nelson	20	0	5+9	0	0+1	0	1+1	0	2+1	0
11	FW	(England) ENG	Marcus Browne	6	0	2+2	0	0+0	0	1+0	0	1+0	0
12	MF	(England) ENG	Alistair Smith	19	1	14+0	1	1+0	0	2+0	0	0+2	0
15	DF	(England) ENG	Freddie Simmonds	4	0	2+1	0	0+0	0	0+0	0	1+0	0
17	DF	(Ghana) GHA	Andy Yiadom	15	1	8+3	0	0+1	1	1+0	0	2+0	0
18	MF	(Jamaica) JAM	Delano McCoy-Splatt	2	0	0+0	0	0+0	0	0+1	0	1+0	0
19	FW	(England) ENG	Donnell McNeilly	4	0	1+2	0	0+1	0	0+0	0	0+0	0
20	GK	(England) ENG	Joe McDonnell	5	0	3+0	0	0+0	0	0+0	0	2+0	0
21	MF	(Grenada) GRN	Myles Hippolyte	18	3	12+1	3	1+0	0	2+0	0	0+2	0
22	DF	(England) ENG	Riley Horan	3	0	0+1	0	0+0	0	0+0	0	2+0	0
23	FW	(England) ENG	Harry Cornick	7	0	3+2	0	1+0	0	0+0	0	1+0	0
25	DF	(England) ENG	Sam Goma	2	0	0+0	0	0+0	0	0+0	0	1+1	0
26	DF	(England) ENG	Dan Sweeney	10	0	7+0	0	0+0	0	2+0	0	1+0	0
27	FW	(England) ENG	Edward Leach	2	0	0+0	0	0+0	0	0+0	0	1+1	0
27	FW	(England) ENG	Joe Kirby	1	0	0+0	0	0+0	0	0+0	0	0+1	0
29	FW	(Norway) NOR	Aron Sasu	19	0	10+3	0	0+1	0	2+0	0	2+1	0
31	FW	(Jamaica) JAM	Dujuan Richards	2	0	1+1	0	0+0	0	0+0	0	0+0	0
33	DF	(England) ENG	Isaac Ogundere	14	0	9+1	0	1+0	0	1+0	0	1+1	0
34	MF	(England) ENG	Harry Hedges	4	0	0+2	0	0+0	0	0+0	0	1+1	0
37	FW	(England) ENG	Robin Ashamu	1	0	0+0	0	0+0	0	0+0	0	0+1	0
38	MF	(England) ENG	Finlay Fraser	1	0	0+0	0	0+0	0	0+0	0	0+1	0
39	GK	(England) ENG	Josef Bursik	10	0	9+0	0	1+0	0	0+0	0	0+0	0
Players who featured but departed the club permanently during the season:
16	FW	(England) ENG	Antwoine Hackford	4	0	0+1	0	0+0	0	0+2	0	1+0	0
30	FW	(Spain) ESP	Junior Nkeng	2	0	0+1	0	0+0	0	0+1	0	0+0	0

== Awards ==
=== Player awards ===
==== EFL League One Player of the Month ====
Month	Player	Result	Ref.
September	(England) Jayden Stockley	Nominated	
