= Junior Nkeng =

Spanish footballer (born 2007)

- Nkeng with Charlton Athletic in 2026

Personal information
- Full name: Robert Junior Forzah Nkeng
- Date of birth: 4 August 2007 (age 19)
- Place of birth: Barcelona, Spain
- Height: 1.78 m (5 ft 10 in)
- Positions: Wing back; winger

Team information
- Current team: Charlton Athletic
- Number: 35

Youth career
- 2015–2016: Brentford
- 2016–2021: Tottenham Hotspur
- 2021–2023: AFC Wimbledon

Senior career*
Years	Team	Apps	(Gls)
2023–2026	AFC Wimbledon	25	(2)
2025	→ Kingstonian (loan)	5	(0)
2025	→ Chelmsford City (loan)	3	(0)
2025	→ Chatham Town (loan)	1	(0)
2026–	Charlton Athletic	0	(0)
- * Club domestic league appearances and goals as of 17:10, 1 September 2026 (UTC)

Robert Junior Forzah Nkeng (born 4 August 2007) is a Spanish professional footballer who plays for EFL Championship club Charlton Athletic as a wing back and a winger.

== Early life ==
Nkeng was born in Barcelona to parents of Cameroonian heritage. His family moved from Spain to London when he was seven.

== Career ==
=== AFC Wimbledon ===
Nkeng with AFC Wimbledon in 2026

Nkeng joined AFC Wimbledon in 2021, following time in the academy at Tottenham Hotspur, making the step up to AFC Wimbledon's under-17's ahead of the 2023–24 season. On 7 November 2023, Nkeng made his AFC Wimbledon debut, coming on as an 89th-minute substitute against Crystal Palace under-21's in the EFL Trophy, later making a second appearance for the Dons in the same competition, again as a substitute, against Wycombe Wanderers eleven days later.

On 29 June 2025, AFC Wimbledon announced that Nkeng had signed his first professional contract with the club. On 9 December 2025, he made his English Football League debut for Wimbledon, coming on as an 85th-minute substitute in a 1–0 loss away to Exeter City.

On 18 March 2026, Nkeng started in a 4–2 home defeat to Leyton Orient, scoring the first two goals of his professional career in the first half.

==== Non-league loans ====
In March 2025, Nkeng was loaned to Isthmian League South Central Division side Kingstonian until the end of the season, making six appearances in all competitions at the club.

On 30 August 2025, following his first start for AFC Wimbledon in an EFL Cup tie against Reading four days prior, Nkeng joined National League South club Chelmsford City on loan.

In October 2025, Nkeng signed on loan for Isthmian League Premier Division club Chatham Town.

=== Charlton Athletic ===
On 1 September 2026, Nkeng signed for Charlton Athletic on a three-year contract for an undisclosed fee.

== Career statistics ==
As of matches played 30 August 2026

Appearances and goals by club, season and competition
Club	Season	League			FA Cup		League Cup		Other		Total	
Club	Season	Division	Apps	Goals	Apps	Goals	Apps	Goals	Apps	Goals	Apps	Goals
AFC Wimbledon	2023–24	League Two	0	0	0	0	0	0	2	0	2	0
AFC Wimbledon	2024–25	League Two	0	0	0	0	0	0	0	0	0	0
AFC Wimbledon	2025–26	League One	24	2	0	0	1	0	5	0	30	2
AFC Wimbledon	2026–27	League One	1	0	0	0	1	0	0	0	2	0
AFC Wimbledon	Total		25	2	0	0	2	0	7	0	34	2
Kingstonian (loan)	2025–26	Isthmian League South Central Division	5	0	0	0	—		0	0	5	0
Chelmsford City (loan)	2025–26	National League South	3	0	1	1	—		0	0	4	1
Chatham Town (loan)	2025–26	Isthmian League Premier Division	1	0	0	0	—		2 (Note: 1 appearance in FA Trophy, 1 appearance and 1 goal in Kent Senior Cup)	1	3	1
Charlton Athletic	2026–27	Championship	0	0	0	0	0	0	0	0	0	0
Career total			34	2	1	1	2	0	9	1	46	4
