= Delano McCoy-Splatt =

Footballer (born 2004)

- McCoy-Splatt with AFC Wimbledon in 2026

Personal information
- Full name: Delano McCoy-Splatt
- Date of birth: 11 October 2004 (age 22)
- Place of birth: London, England
- Height: 1.71 m (5 ft 7 in)
- Position: Central midfielder

Team information
- Current team: AFC Wimbledon
- Number: 18

Youth career
- 2013–2016: Dulwich Hamlet
- 2016–2025: Fulham

Senior career*
Years	Team	Apps	(Gls)
2025–	AFC Wimbledon	0	(0)
2026	→ Yeovil Town (loan)	8	(0)

International career^{‡}
2023	Jamaica	1	(0)
- * Club domestic league appearances and goals as of 16:32, 25 April 2026 (UTC) ‡ National team caps and goals as of 21:04, 4 September 2023 (UTC)

Delano McCoy-Splatt (born 11 October 2004) is a footballer who plays as a midfielder for EFL League One club AFC Wimbledon. Born in England, he is a Jamaica international.

== Early life ==
Born in London, he started playing football at a young age because of his father, a former footballer.

== Club career ==
As a youth player, McCoy-Splatt joined the youth academy of English lower league side Dulwich Hamlet. In 2016, he joined the youth academy of Fulham in the English Premier League. McCoy-Splatt captained the Fulham U18 team, before moving to the U21 team in 2023.

In June 2025, it was announced that McCoy-Splatt had departed Premier League club Fulham

On 1 July 2025, McCoy-Splatt joined recently promoted League One side AFC Wimbledon, signing a two year deal. On 19 March 2026, McCoy-Splatt joined National League club Yeovil Town on loan until the end of the 2025–26 season.

== International career ==
In early 2023, Jamaica national team coach Heimir Hallgrímsson spoke of selecting young Jamaican-eligible players from overseas U17 and U18 teams, in order to assess them and encourage them to declare for Jamaica. On 7 March 2023, McCoy-Splatt was named in a youthful squad, containing a number of English-based teenagers ahead of two friendlies against Trinidad and Tobago. He went onto make his senior international debut on 11 March, in a 1–0 home friendly defeat to Trinidad and Tobago.

== Style of play ==
McCoy-Splatt mainly operates as a centre midfielder.

== Personal life ==
He is the brother of the footballer Jamie Splatt and British Virgin Islands international footballer Javaun Splatt.

== Career statistics ==
=== Club ===
As of match played 27 August 2026

Appearances and goals by club, season and competition
Club	Season	League			FA Cup		EFL Cup		Other		Total	
Club	Season	Division	Apps	Goals	Apps	Goals	Apps	Goals	Apps	Goals	Apps	Goals
Fulham U21	2023–24	—			—		—		1 (Note: Appearance(s) in EFL Trophy)	1	1	1
Fulham U21	2024–25	—			—		—		1	0	1	0
AFC Wimbledon	2025–26	League One	0	0	1	0	1	0	2	0	4	0
AFC Wimbledon	2026–27	League One	0	0	0	0	1	0	1	0	2	0
AFC Wimbledon	Total		0	0	1	0	2	0	3	0	6	0
Yeovil Town (loan)	2025–26	National League	8	0	—		—		—		8	0
Career total			8	0	1	0	1	0	4	1	14	1

=== International ===
As of match played 11 March 2023

National team	Year	Apps	Goals
Jamaica	2023	1	0
Total		1	0

== Honours ==
Fulham U21

- Premier League Cup: 2023–24
