= 2025–26 AFC Wimbledon season =

24th season in existence of AFC Wimbledon

AFC Wimbledon
2025–26 season
- Owner: The Dons Trust
- Manager: Johnnie Jackson
- Stadium: Plough Lane
- League One: 19th
- FA Cup: First round
- EFL Cup: Second round
- EFL Trophy: Quarter-Finals
- Top goalscorer: League: Marcus Browne (12); All: Marcus Browne (14)
- Highest home attendance: 8,686 vs Port Vale, League One, 11 October 2025
- Lowest home attendance: 599 vs Crystal Palace U21, EFL Trophy, 16 September 2025
- Average home league attendance: 8,378
- Biggest win: 5–1 vs Cardiff City (H), EFL Trophy, 2 December 2025, EFL Trophy
- Biggest defeat: 0–5 vs Peterborough United (H), League One, 8 November 2025

The 2025–26 season was the 24th season in the history of AFC Wimbledon and their first season back in League One since the 2021–22 season. In addition to the domestic league, the club also participated in the FA Cup, the EFL Cup, and the EFL Trophy.

== Transfers and contracts ==
=== In ===
Date	Pos.	Player	From	Fee	Ref.
1 July 2025	GK	(England) Nathan Bishop	(England) Sunderland	Undisclosed	
1 July 2025	CM	(Jamaica) Delano McCoy-Splatt	(England) Fulham	Free	
1 July 2025 (Note: The transfer was announced on 26 June, and would become official on July 1 once his contract at Eastleigh had expired)	GK	(England) Joe McDonnell	(England) Eastleigh	Free	
1 July 2025 (Note: The transfer was announced on 24 June, and would become official on July 1 once his contract at Motherwell had expired)	LB	(England) Steve Seddon	(Scotland) Motherwell	Free	
1 July 2025 (Note: The transfer was announced on 23 June, and would become official on July 1 once his contract at Lincoln had expired)	CM	(England) Alistair Smith	(England) Lincoln City	Free	
30 July 2025	CF	(England) Antwoine Hackford	(England) Sheffield United	Free transfer	
30 July 2025	CF	(England) Danilo Orsi	(England) Burton Albion	Undisclosed	
20 August 2025	CB	(Germany) Patrick Bauer	(England) Preston North End	Free	

=== Out ===
Date	Pos.	Player	To	Fee	Ref.
11 January 2026	CF	(England) Danilo Orsi	(England) Crawley Town	Undisclosed	
16 January 2026	CB	(England) Riley Harbottle	(England) Bristol Rovers	Free Transfer	

=== Loaned in ===
Date	Pos.	Player	From	Date until	Ref.
30 July 2025	RB	(Uganda) Nathan Asiimwe	(England) Charlton Athletic	31 May 2026	
29 August 2025	RB	(England) Brodi Hughes	(England) Chelsea	31 May 2026	
20 January 2026	CAM	(England) Zack Nelson	(England) Luton Town	31 May 2026	
20 January 2026	RW	(England) James Tilley	(England) Wycombe Wanderers	31 May 2026	
2 February 2026	CF	(England) Layton Stewart	(Switzerland) Thun	31 May 2026	

=== Loaned out ===
Date	Pos.	Player	To	Date until	Ref.
25 July 2025	CB	(England) Leo Young	(England) Havant & Waterlooville	22 August 2025	
4 August 2025	CM	(England) Kai Jennings	(England) Farnborough	24 October 2025 (Note: On 24 October, Jennings was recalled from his loan at Farnborough, and subsequently joined Sutton on loan)	
16 August 2025	CB	(England) Riley Horan	(England) Walton & Hersham	14 April 2026 (Note: On 5 January, Horan's loan at Walton & Hersham was extended until the end of the season. But on 14 April he was recalled to the club)	
18 August 2025	RW	(England) Ed Leach	(England) Whitehawk	23 October 2025 (Note: On 23 October, Leach was recalled from his loan at Whitehawk, and subsequently joined Carshalton on loan)	
22 August 2025	CM	(England) Harry Sidwell	(England) Dagenham & Redbridge	31 December 2025 (Note: On 17 October, Sidwell's loan at Dagenham was extended by an additional month, Then on 14 November it was extended again until end of December)	
30 August 2025	LW	(Spain) Junior Nkeng	(England) Chelmsford City	27 September 2025	
1 September 2025	SS	(Northern Ireland) Josh Kelly	(England) Woking	31 May 2026	
17 October 2025	LW	(Spain) Junior Nkeng	(England) Chatham Town	3 January 2026	
23 October 2025	RW	(England) Ed Leach	(England) Carshalton Athletic	3 January 2026	
24 October 2025	CM	(England) Kai Jennings	(England) Sutton United	31 May 2026 (Note: On 5 January, Jennings' loan at Sutton was extended until the end of the season)	
24 October 2025	CB	(England) Leo Young	(England) Welling United	22 November 2025	
14 November 2025	RW	(England) Osman Foyo	(England) Sutton United	3 January 2026	
24 November 2025	CB	(England) Ethan Sutcliffe	(England) Tonbridge Angels	31 May 2026 (Note: On 5 January, Sutcliffe's loan at Tonbridge was extended until the end of the season)	
28 November 2025	CB	(England) Leo Young	(England) Ramsgate	27 December 2025	
9 January 2026	CM	(England) Harry Sidwell	(England) Dorking Wanderers	31 May 2026	
25 February 2026	RW	(England) Osman Foyo	(England) Sutton United	31 May 2026	
27 February 2026	RW	(England) Kiayon Moore	(England) Bedfont Sports	31 May 2026	
27 February 2026	CB	(England) Leo Young	(England) Carshalton Athletic	31 May 2026	
13 March 2026	CAM	(England) Harry Hedges	(England) Horsham	31 May 2026	
19 March 2026	CM	(Jamaica) Delano McCoy-Splatt	(England) Yeovil Town	31 May 2026	

=== Released / Out of Contract ===
Date	Pos.	Player	Subsequent club	Join date	Ref.
30 June 2025	CM	(England) James Ball	(England) Swindon Town	1 July 2025	
30 June 2025	RM	(England) Josh Neufville	(England) Bradford City	1 July 2025	
30 June 2025	RW	(England) James Tilley	(England) Wycombe Wanderers	1 July 2025	
30 June 2025	GK	(England) Lewis Ward	(England) Swindon Town	2 July 2025	
30 June 2025	LW	(England) Ryan McLean	(England) Buxton	7 July 2025	
30 June 2025	RB	(England) Huseyin Biler	(Turkey) İskenderunspor	30 July 2025	
30 June 2025	CM	(Wales) Morgan Williams	(England) King's Lynn Town	31 July 2025	
30 June 2025	CB	(England) Will Nightingale	(England) Aldershot Town	5 August 2025	
30 June 2025	LW	(England) Paris Lock	(England) Charlton Athletic	6 August 2025	
30 June 2025	AM	(England) Reuben Amissah	(England) Charlton Athletic	1 October 2025	
30 June 2025	CB	(Republic of Ireland) John-Joe O'Toole			

=== New Contract ===
Date	Pos.	Player	Contract until	Ref.
5 June 2025	CB	(Northern Ireland) Ryan Johnson	30 June 2027	
25 June 2025	DM	(England) Sam Hutchinson	30 June 2026	
27 June 2025	LW	(England) Marcus Browne	30 June 2027	
29 June 2025	CB	(England) Riley Horan	Undisclosed (Note: First professional contract)	
29 June 2025	RW	(England) Ed Leach	Undisclosed	
29 June 2025	RW	(Spain) Junior Nkeng	Undisclosed	
8 October 2025	CB	(England) Isaac Ogundere	30 June 2027 (Note: Option of a further year)	

== Pre-season and friendlies ==
On 12 May, AFC Wimbledon announced a trip to Marbella as part of their pre-season preparations. At the end of May, a second fixture was confirmed to be against Sutton United. On 10 June, three further fixtures were added, against Enfield Town, Watford and Millwall. As part of the Spain tour, the Dons confirmed they would face Pafos. On 24 June, a sixth friendly was announced against Southend United.

Win Draw Loss Fixtures

5 July 2025 Friendly	AFC Wimbledon	2–2	Pafos	Marbella, Spain
11:30 CEST	Kelly 35'; Stevens 90+1'	Report	Luckassen 1'; Bruno 45+1'	Stadium: Marbella Football Center

9 July 2025 Friendly	Enfield Town	2–4	AFC Wimbledon	Woolwich
19:00 BST	Wood 22', 23'	Report	Stevens 35'; Smith 73'; Foyo 74', 80'	Stadium: Queen Elizabeth II Stadium

12 July 2025 Friendly	Watford	1–1	AFC Wimbledon	Ruislip
15:00 BST	Dwomoh 68'	Report	Kelly 61'	Stadium: Grosvenor Vale

19 July 2025 Friendly	Sutton United	2–0	AFC Wimbledon	Sutton
15:00 BST	Nadesan 5'; Odelusi 89' (pen.)	Report		Stadium: Gander Green Lane; Attendance: 1,137 (435 Dons)

22 July 2025 Friendly	AFC Wimbledon	0–3	Millwall	Wimbledon
19:30 BST		Report	Azeez 6'; Howland 39'; Ivanović 56'	Stadium: Plough Lane

26 July 2025 Friendly	Southend United	1–0	AFC Wimbledon	Southend-on-Sea
13:00 BST	Kendall 8'	Report		Stadium: Roots Hall

5 August 2025 Friendly	Brentford B	1–2	AFC Wimbledon	Osterley
14:00 BST	Boni 55'	Report	Bugiel 85'; Nkeng 87'	Stadium: Brentford Training Ground; Attendance: 0 (behind closed doors)

== Competitions ==
=== League One ===
==== League table ====
Pos	Team	Pld	W	D	L	GF	GA	GD	Pts	Promotion, qualification or relegation
17	Burton Albion	46	13	15	18	50	60	−10	54	
18	Peterborough United	46	15	8	23	64	68	−4	53	
19	AFC Wimbledon	46	15	8	23	51	72	−21	53	
20	Leyton Orient	46	14	10	22	59	71	−12	52	
21	Exeter City (R)	46	12	13	21	52	61	−9	49	Relegation to EFL League Two

Source: EFL Official Website
Rules for classification: 1) Points; 2) Goal difference; 3) Number of goals scored; 4) Head-to-head results; 5) Wins; 6) Away goals; 7) Penalty points (sec 9.5); 8) 12-point sending off offences
(R) Relegated

==== Results summary ====
Overall								Home						Away					
Pld	W	D	L	GF	GA	GD	Pts	W	D	L	GF	GA	GD	W	D	L	GF	GA	GD
46	15	8	23	51	72	−21	53	8	4	11	25	31	−6	7	4	12	26	41	−15

Last updated: complete.
Source: Soccerway

==== Results by round ====
Round	1	2	3	4	5	6	7	8	9	10	11	12	13	14	15	17	18	19	20	21	22	23	24	25	27	28	30	29^{3}	31	32	33	34	35	36	26^{2}	37	38	39	40	41	42	43	16^{1}	44	45	46
Ground	A	H	A	H	H	A	A	H	A	H	A	H	A	H	A	H	A	A	H	A	H	H	A	A	H	A	A	H	H	A	A	H	A	H	H	A	H	H	A	A	H	A	H	H	A	H
Result	L	W	W	L	W	L	L	W	W	W	W	D	W	L	L	L	D	L	D	L	D	L	W	L	L	D	L	W	W	D	L	W	D	W	W	L	L	D	L	L	L	L	L	L	W	L
Position	18	10	10	14	10	12	15	11	9	6	5	5	4	5	7	8	9	9	10	13	14	17	12	13	17	18	17	16	14	15	16	13	14	14	11	13	14	14	14	16	16	20	20	20	19	19
Points	0	3	6	6	9	9	9	12	15	18	21	22	25	25	25	25	26	26	27	27	28	28	31	31	31	32	32	35	38	39	39	42	43	46	49	49	49	50	50	50	50	50	50	50	53	53

Source: EFL
A = Away; H = Home; W = Win; D = Draw; L = Loss; P = Postponed
Notes:
- ^{1} Matchday 16 (vs. Stockport County) was postponed due to international call-ups.
- ^{2} Matchday 26 (vs. Blackpool) was postponed due to Blackpool's FA Cup progression.
- ^{3} Matchday 29 (vs. Port Vale) was postponed due to a waterlogged pitch.

==== Matches ====
On 26 June, the League One fixtures were released, with Wimbledon visiting Luton Town on the opening weekend.

Win Draw Loss Fixtures

1 August 2025 1	Luton Town	1–0	AFC Wimbledon	Luton
20:00 BST	Alli (yellow card) 83'; Johnson 85' (o.g.)	Report	Lewis (yellow card) 36'	Stadium: Kenilworth Road; Attendance: 11,735 (1,321 away); Referee: Thomas Parsons

9 August 2025 2	AFC Wimbledon	2–0	Lincoln City	Wimbledon
15:00 BST	Stevens 41' (pen.); Asiimwe 77'	Report	Jackson (red card) 23'	Stadium: Plough Lane; Attendance: 8,067 (789 away); Referee: Matthew Russell

16 August 2025 3	Reading	1–2	AFC Wimbledon	Reading
15:00 BST	Stickland (yellow card) 69'; Wing 86'	Report	Stevens 32'; Browne 70'; Johnson (yellow card) 74'	Stadium: Madejski Stadium; Attendance: 13,757 (1,757); Referee: Jamie O'Connor

19 August 2025 4	AFC Wimbledon	0–1	Cardiff City	Wimbledon
19:45 BST	Stevens (yellow card) 34'; Browne (yellow card) 90+6'	Report	Salech (yellow card) 40'; Lawlor (yellow card) 71'; Davies 90+2'	Stadium: Plough Lane; Attendance: 8,452 (1,310 away); Referee: David Rock

23 August 2025 5	AFC Wimbledon	2–0	Barnsley	Wimbledon
15:00 BST	Ogundere (yellow card) 8'; Stevens 29'; Seddon (yellow card) 50'; Hackford 70'	Report	Earl (yellow card) 47'	Stadium: Plough Lane; Attendance: 8,361 (1,206 away); Referee: Oliver Yates

30 August 2025 6	Bradford City	3–2	AFC Wimbledon	Bradford
15:00 BST	Wright 32'; Pointon 61'; Swan 83'	Report	Browne 25'; Stevens 53'; Reeves (yellow card) 78'	Stadium: Valley Parade; Attendance: 19,076 (471 away); Referee: Martin Coy

6 September 2025 7	Bolton Wanderers	3–0	AFC Wimbledon	Horwich
15:00 BST	Burstow 29'; Cozier-Dubbery 53'; Randall 62'; Gale (yellow card) 69'; Forino-Joseph (yellow card) 71'	Report	Reeves (yellow card) 4'; Browne (red card) 50'; Lewis (yellow card) 74' (yellow-red card) 90'	Stadium: Toughsheet Community Stadium; Attendance: 20,157; Referee: Darren Drysdale

13 September 2025 8	AFC Wimbledon	2–1	Rotherham United	Wimbledon
15:00 BST	Johnson (yellow card) 33'; Reeves 50'; Stevens 67' (pen.); Harbottle (yellow card) 79'	Report	Jules (yellow card) 2'; Spence (yellow card) 7'; Hugill 38', (yellow card) 66'	Stadium: Plough Lane; Attendance: 8,058 (546 away); Referee: Lee Swabey

20 September 2025 9	Doncaster Rovers	1−2	AFC Wimbledon	Doncaster
15:00 BST	Molyneux (yellow card) 37'; Bailey 53'	Report	Seddon (yellow card) 37'; Johnson 70'; Smith (yellow card) 80'; Hippolyte 82'	Stadium: Eco-Power Stadium; Attendance: 7,889; Referee: Peter Wright

27 September 2025 10	AFC Wimbledon	2–1	Wycombe Wanderers	Wimbledon
12:30 BST	Bugiel 11'; Seddon 32'	Report	Henderson 60'	Stadium: Plough Lane; Attendance: 8,477 (875 away); Referee: Scott Jackson
Note: Fixture was originally scheduled for a 15:00 kick-off, but was moved live Sky Sports broadcasting.

4 October 2025 11	Blackpool	0–2	AFC Wimbledon	Blackpool
	Casey (yellow card) 39'; Bowler (yellow card) 45+1'; Evans (yellow card) 88'	Report	Orsi 38', 63'; Ogundere (yellow card) 45+5'	Stadium: Bloomfield Road; Attendance: 8,906; Referee: Ben Speedle

11 October 2025 12	AFC Wimbledon	1–1	Port Vale	Wimbledon
10:00 BST	Reeves (yellow card) 69'; Hackford 72'; Ogundere (yellow card) 90+1'	Report	Croasdale (yellow card) 46'; Lawrence-Gabriel (yellow card) 76'; Cole 86'	Stadium: Plough Lane; Attendance: 8,686; Referee: Carl Brook

18 October 2025 13	Plymouth Argyle	1–2	AFC Wimbledon	Plymouth
10:00 BST	Tolaj 6'	Report	Asiimwe (yellow card) 21'; Bauer (yellow card) 28'; Bugiel 44'; Harbottle (yellow card) 46'; Browne 52'	Stadium: Home Park; Attendance: 16,215; Referee: Matthew Corlett

25 October 2025 14	AFC Wimbledon	0–1	Burton Albion	Wimbledon
15:00 BST	Bugiel (penalty missed) 34', (yellow card) 48'; Johnson (yellow card) 72'	Report	Hartridge 51', (yellow card) 72'; Collins (yellow card) 79'; Godwin-Malife (yellow card) 90+3'	Stadium: Plough Lane; Attendance: 8,361 (279 away); Referee: Ben Atkinson

8 November 2025 15	Peterborough United	5–0	AFC Wimbledon	Peterborough
15:00 GMT	Leonard 11', 16' (pen.); O'Connor (yellow card) 22'; Lisbie 36'; Kioso (yellow card) 48'; Lindgren 77', 90+3'	Report	Ogundere (yellow card) 15'	Stadium: London Road Stadium; Attendance: 9,827 (1,318 away); Referee: Simon Mather

22 November 2025 17	AFC Wimbledon	1–2	Wigan Athletic	Wimbledon
15:00 GMT	Reeves (yellow card) 40'; Johnson (yellow card) 53'; Smith 70'	Report	Murray (yellow card) 33'; Bettoni 77', 87'	Stadium: Plough Lane; Attendance: 8,370 (771 away); Referee: Richard Eley

29 November 2025 18	Huddersfield Town	3–3	AFC Wimbledon	Huddersfield
15:00 GMT	Castledine 46'; Wiles 63'; Ashia (yellow card) 81'; May 86'; Radulović (yellow card) 89'	Report	Browne 32'; Orsi 48'; Hippolyte (yellow card) 57'; Johnson 71', (yellow card) 73'	Stadium: Kirklees Stadium; Attendance: 16,355 (712 away); Referee: Scott Oldham

9 December 2025 19	Exeter City	1–0	AFC Wimbledon	Exeter
19:45 GMT	Fitzwater (yellow card) 44'; Yfeko (yellow card) 68'; McMillan 80'	Report		Stadium: St James Park; Attendance: 5,579 (445 away); Referee: Will Finnie

13 December 2025 20	AFC Wimbledon	0–0	Mansfield Town	Wimbledon
12:30 GMT	Browne (yellow card) 62'; Nkeng (yellow card) 90+5'	Report	Cargill (yellow card) 26'; Hewitt (yellow card) 37'; McLaughlin (yellow card) 90+3'	Stadium: Plough Lane; Attendance: 8,474 (868 away); Referee: Elliot Bell
Note: Fixture was originally scheduled for a 15:00 kick-off, but was rescheduled for live Sky Sports broadcasting.

19 December 2025 21	Northampton Town	3–1	AFC Wimbledon	Northampton
19:45 GMT	McCarthy 10'; Thorniley (yellow card) 26'; McGeehan 50', 59'; Hoskins (yellow card) 76'	Report	Browne 16'; Asilmwe (yellow card) 47'; Reeves (yellow card) 85'	Stadium: Sixfields Stadium; Attendance: 6,252; Referee: Carl Brook
Note: Fixture was initially scheduled for 20 December, but was rescheduled to avoid a clash with Northampton Saints.

26 December 2025 22	AFC Wimbledon	0–0	Stevenage	Wimbledon
15:00 GMT		Report		Stadium: Plough Lane; Attendance: 8,465

29 December 2025 23	AFC Wimbledon	0–1	Exeter City	Wimbledon
19:45 GMT	Seddon (yellow card) 90+8'; Hippolyte (yellow card) 90+9'; Bishop (yellow card) 90+11'	Report	Wareham 37'; McMillan (yellow card) 62'; Doyle-Hayes (yellow card) 68'; Whitworth (yellow card) 90+1'; Aitchison (yellow card) 90+9'	Stadium: Plough Lane; Attendance: 8,621 (921 away); Referee: Jacob Miles

1 January 2026 24	Leyton Orient	1–3	AFC Wimbledon	Leyton
15:00 GMT	Ballard 6'; Obiero (yellow card) 67'; Simpson (yellow card) 89'	Report	Browne (yellow card) 17', (goal) 86'; Mitchell 24' (o.g.); Hippolyte 69'	Stadium: Brisbane Road; Referee: Ben Atkinson

4 January 2026 25	Wycombe Wanderers	2–0	AFC Wimbledon	High Wycombe
15:00 GMT	Quitirna 12'; Harvie (yellow card) 31'; Huggins 67', (yellow card) 90'	Report	Hippolyte (yellow card) 14'; Browne (yellow card) 73'	Stadium: Adams Park; Attendance: 5,856 (1,194 away); Referee: Thomas Parsons

17 January 2026 27	AFC Wimbledon	0–1	Doncaster Rovers	Wimbledon
15:00 GMT	Seddon (yellow card) 66'; Lewis (yellow card) 72' (yellow-red card) 90'; Reeves (yellow card) 85'	Report	Senior (yellow card) 56'; Gotts (yellow card) 73'; Bailey 90+9'	Stadium: Plough Lane; Attendance: 8,092 (627 away); Referee: James Durkin

24 January 2026 28	Rotherham United	1–1	AFC Wimbledon	Rotherham
15:00 GMT	James (yellow card) 22'; Jules 50'; Gray (yellow card) 60'	Report	Johnson (yellow card) 39'; Bauer (yellow card) 48'; Browne 82'	Stadium: New York Stadium; Attendance: 7,787 (464 away); Referee: Richard Eley

31 January 2026 30	AFC Wimbledon	0–1	Bolton Wanderers	Wimbledon
12:30 GMT	Smith (yellow card) 90+5'	Report	Blackett-Taylor 13'; McAtee (yellow card) 60'	Stadium: Plough Lane; Attendance: 8,659 (926 away); Referee: Andrew Humphries
Note: Fixture was initially scheduled for a 15:00 kick-off, but was rescheduled for live Sky Sports broadcasting.

3 February 2026 29	Port Vale	0–1	AFC Wimbledon	Burslem
19:45 GMT	Garrity (yellow card) 12'; Hall (yellow card) 38'; Lawrence-Gabriel (yellow card) 68'	Report	Browne (yellow card) 12'; Johnson (yellow card) 62'; Maycock 88'	Stadium: Vale Park; Attendance: 4,534 (121 away); Referee: James Oldham
Note: Fixture was originally scheduled for 27 January, but it was postponed due to a waterlogged pitch.

7 February 2026 31	AFC Wimbledon	3–2	Reading	Wimbledon
15:00 GMT	Browne 8', 53', 71'	Report	Marriott 33'; Dorsett 65'; O'Connor (yellow card) 69'	Stadium: Plough Lane; Attendance: 8,574 (928 away); Referee: Dale Baines

14 February 2026 32	Barnsley	3–3	AFC Wimbledon	Barnsley
15:00 GMT	McGoldrick 10'; Bradshaw 14'; O'Keeffe (yellow card) 31'; Bland (yellow card) 62'; Banks 87'	Report	Bugiel 25', 27'; Browne 74'	Stadium: Oakwell; Attendance: 9,640 (472 away); Referee: Charles Breakspear

17 February 2026 33	Cardiff City	4–1	AFC Wimbledon	Leckwith
19:45 GMT	Colwill 22'; Ng 58'; Tanner 61'; Kellyman 87'	Report	Stevens 45+1'; Johnson (yellow card) 50'; Reeves (yellow card) 83'	Stadium: Cardiff City Stadium; Attendance: 18,028; Referee: Simon Mather

21 February 2026 34	AFC Wimbledon	3–1	Bradford City	Wimbledon
15:00 GMT	Tilley 11'; Hippolyte (yellow card) 35'; Browne 42'; Stevens 67'	Report	Humphrys 76'	Stadium: Plough Lane; Attendance: 8,486; Referee: Ross Martin

28 February 2026 35	Mansfield Town	2–2	AFC Wimbledon	Mansfield
15:00 GMT	Russel 7', 29'; McLaughlin (yellow card) 54'; Oshilaja (yellow card) 90'	Report	Tilley 14'; Stevens 58'; Bugiel (yellow card) 90+4'	Stadium: Field Mill; Attendance: 7,693; Referee: Seb Stockbridge

8 March 2026 36	AFC Wimbledon	1–0	Northampton Town	Wimbledon
12:00 GMT	Maycock 10'	Report	Dyche (yellow card) 80'	Stadium: Plough Lane; Attendance: 8,142; Referee: Elliot Bell
Note: Fixture was originally scheduled for 7 March, but was moved for live Sky Sports broadcasting.

11 March 2026 26	AFC Wimbledon	4–1	Blackpool	Wimbledon
19:45 GMT	Johnson 11'; Stevens 54'; Nelson 90+4'; Bugiel 90+7'	Report	Ennis 63'	Stadium: Plough Lane; Attendance: 7,535; Referee: Lee Swabey
Note: Fixture was initially scheduled for 10 January, but was postponed due to Blackpool's FA Cup progression.

14 March 2026 37	Stevenage	1–0	AFC Wimbledon	Stevenage
15:00 GMT	Reid 10' (pen.); Kemp (yellow card) 54'; Freestone (yellow card) 90+3'	Report	Smith (yellow card) 3'; Hippolyte (yellow card) 90+4'	Stadium: Broadhall Way; Attendance: 4,089 (1,102 away); Referee: Declan Bourne

17 March 2026 38	AFC Wimbledon	2–4	Leyton Orient	Wimbledon
19:45 GMT	Nkeng 39', 45+1'; Browne (yellow card) 90+5'	Report	Ballard 15', 48', 70'; Happe (yellow card) 53'; Morris 57'	Stadium: Plough Lane; Attendance: 8,275 (1,124 away); Referee: Alan Dale

21 March 2026 39	AFC Wimbledon	1–1	Peterborough United	Wimbledon
15:00 GMT	Hippolyte (yellow card) 30'; Johnson 43'; Maycock (yellow card) 50'	Report	Lisbie (yellow card) 66'; Morgan 67', (yellow card) 68'; Dornelly (yellow card) 90+4'	Stadium: Plough Lane; Attendance: 8,460 (1,060 away); Referee: Scott Jackson

28 March 2026 40	Stockport County	3–0	AFC Wimbledon	Edgeley
15:00 GMT	Sidibeh 2'; Wootton 39'; Bate (yellow card) 71'; Norwood 90+7'	Report		Stadium: Edgeley Park; Attendance: 9,530 (555 away); Referee: Craig Hicks

3 April 2026 41	Lincoln City	1–0	AFC Wimbledon	Lincoln
15:00 BST	Hackett (yellow card) 52'; Oné 88'	Report	Lewis (yellow card) 59'; Hackford (yellow card) 61'; Bishop (yellow card) 76'; Bugiel (yellow card) 90+2'	Stadium: Sincil Bank; Attendance: 10,088 (762 away); Referee: Edward Duckworth

6 April 2026 42	AFC Wimbledon	0–3	Luton Town	Wimbledon
15:00 BST	Lewis (yellow card) 28'	Report	Palmer 12'; Al-Hamadi 59'; Richards (yellow card) 63', (goal) 79'	Stadium: Plough Lane; Attendance: 8,668 (930 away); Referee: Carl Brook

11 April 2026 43	Burton Albion	1–0	AFC Wimbledon	Burton upon Trent
15:00 BST	Lofthouse 55'; Webster (yellow card) 76'	Report		Stadium: Pirelli Stadium; Attendance: 3,654; Referee: Martin Woods

15 April 2026 16	AFC Wimbledon	0–2	Stockport County	Wimbledon
19:45 BST	Reeves (yellow card) 22'	Report	Pye (yellow card) 45+1'; Stokes 59'; Wootton (yellow card) 62'; Edun 72'; Dixon (yellow card) 86'; Norwood (yellow card) 89'	Stadium: Plough Lane; Attendance: 8,040 (708 away); Referee: Darren Drysdale
Note: Fixture was originally scheduled for 15 November, but it was postponed due to international call-ups.

18 April 2026 44	AFC Wimbledon	1–3	Plymouth Argyle	Wimbledon
15:00 BST	Johnson (yellow card) 24'; Smith 51'; Seddon (yellow card) 75'	Report	Mitchell 6'; Tolaj (yellow card) 24', (goal) 68'; Ross (yellow card) 45+3'; Sarpong-Wiredu (yellow card) 55'; Pepple 76'	Stadium: Plough Lane; Attendance: 8,737 (939 away); Referee: Elliot Swallow

25 April 2026 45	Wigan Athletic	0-1	AFC Wimbledon	Wigan
15:00 BST				Stadium: Brick Community Stadium

2 May 2026 46	AFC Wimbledon	0–4	Huddersfield Town	Wimbledon
15:00 BST	Johnson (yellow card) 31'; Seddon (yellow card) 77'	Report	Sørensen 10'; Ledson (yellow card) 32'; May 57', 72'; Sebine 66'	Stadium: Plough Lane; Attendance: 8,784 (924 away); Referee: George Laflin

=== FA Cup ===
Wimbledon were drawn at home to Gateshead in the first round.

Win Draw Loss Fixtures

1 November 2025 First round	AFC Wimbledon	0–2	Gateshead	Wimbledon
15:00 GMT		Report	Adom 21'; John 51'; Brooks (yellow card) 61'; Melbourne (yellow card) 64'; Ferguson (yellow card) 90+4'	Stadium: Plough Lane; Attendance: 5,321 (249 away); Referee: Aaron Farmer

=== EFL Cup ===
Wimbledon were drawn away to Gillingham in the first round and to Reading in the second round.

Win Draw Loss Fixtures

12 August 2025 First round	Gillingham	1–1 (2–4 p)	AFC Wimbledon	Gillingham
19:45 BST	Coleman 83'	Report	Hackford 32'; Sasu (yellow card) 42'; Johnson (yellow card) 80'	Stadium: Priestfield Stadium; Attendance: 2,205 (349 away); Referee: Neil Hair
	Penalties
	Clark (penalty scored); Williams (penalty missed); McKenzie (penalty scored); Andrews (penalty missed)		(penalty scored) Stevens; (penalty scored) Kelly; (penalty scored) Hippolyte; (penalty scored) Smith

26 August 2025 Second round	Reading	2–1	AFC Wimbledon	Reading
19:00 BST	Fraser 24'; Camará 70'	Report	Bugiel 26'; Sasu (yellow card) 58'	Stadium: Madejski Stadium; Attendance: 3,860 (622 away); Referee: Jacob Miles

=== EFL Trophy ===
Wimbledon were drawn against Bromley, Stevenage and Crystal Palace U21 in the group stage. After finishing second in the group, they were drawn away to Cardiff City in the round of 32, at home to West Ham United U21 in the round of 16 and home to Northampton Town in the quarter-finals.

Pos	Div	Team	Pld	W	PW	PL	L	GF	GA	GD	Pts	Qualification
1	L1	Stevenage	3	3	0	0	0	12	4	+8	9	Advance to Round 2
2	L1	AFC Wimbledon	3	2	0	0	1	6	7	−1	6	Advance to Round 2
3	L2	Bromley	3	0	1	0	2	5	7	−2	2	
4	ACA	Crystal Palace U21	3	0	0	1	2	6	11	−5	1	

Source: EFL

Win Draw Loss Fixtures

2 September 2025 South Group E	AFC Wimbledon	1–5	Stevenage	Wimbledon
19:00 BST	Sasu (yellow card) 23'; Orsi 31' (pen.)	Report	Patterson 4'; Lubala 15'; Butler (yellow card) 38'; White (yellow card) 43', (goal) 50'; Ahadme 45', 81'	Stadium: Plough Lane; Attendance: 1,375 (89 away); Referee: Ben Atkinson

16 September 2025 South Group E	AFC Wimbledon	3–1	Crystal Palace U21	Wimbledon
19:00 BST	Lewis 45+1'; Harbottle (yellow card) 68'; Hackford 74'; Bauer (yellow card) 82'; Jennings 87'	Report	King (yellow card) 51'; Agbinone 62' (pen.); Reid (yellow card) 90+2'	Stadium: Plough Lane; Attendance: 599 (55 away); Referee: Elliott Swallow

11 November 2025 South Group E	Bromley	1–2	AFC Wimbledon	Bromley
19:45 GMT	Odutayo 33'	Report	Hackford 14'; Smith (yellow card) 21'; Lewis (yellow card) 45'; Browne 73'; Harbottle (yellow card) 88'	Stadium: Hayes Lane; Referee: Paul Howard

2 December 2025 Round of 32	Cardiff City	1–5	AFC Wimbledon	Leckwith
19:00 GMT	Giles 88'	Report	Sasu 29', 46', 54', 76'; Bugiel 49'	Stadium: Cardiff City Stadium; Attendance: 2,107 (83 away); Referee: Abigail Byrne

12 January 2026 Round of 16	AFC Wimbledon	4–2	West Ham United U21	Wimbledon
19:00 GMT	Smith 3', (yellow card) 61'; Maycock 40'; Browne 47'; Hippolyte (yellow card) 86', (goal) 90+6'; Stevens (yellow card) 90+4'; Ogundere (yellow card) 90+5'	Report	Golambeckis (yellow card) 56'; Ajala 66'; Orford 84'; Adiele (yellow card) 90+4'	Stadium: Plough Lane; Attendance: 2,043 (689 away); Referee: Kirsty Dowle

10 February 2026 Quarter-finals	AFC Wimbledon	1–2	Northampton Town	Wimbledon
19:00 GMT	Stevens 50'	Report	Vale 38'; Eaves 73', (yellow card) 90+4'; McAdam (yellow card) 75'	Stadium: Plough Lane; Attendance: 1,752 (319 away); Referee: Paul Howard

== Statistics ==
=== Appearances and goals ===
Players with no appearances are not included on the list; italics indicated loaned in player

No.	Pos	Nat	Player	Total		League One		FA Cup		EFL Cup		EFL Trophy	
No.	Pos	Nat	Player	Apps	Goals	Apps	Goals	Apps	Goals	Apps	Goals	Apps	Goals
1	GK	(England) ENG	Nathan Bishop	39	0	38+0	0	1+0	0	0+0	0	0+0	0
2	DF	(Uganda) UGA	Nathan Asiimwe	43	1	28+8	1	0+0	0	1+1	0	4+1	0
3	DF	(England) ENG	Steve Seddon	52	1	45+0	1	1+0	0	0+2	0	4+0	0
4	MF	(England) ENG	Jake Reeves	43	1	32+6	1	1+0	0	1+0	0	2+1	0
5	MF	(England) ENG	Sam Hutchinson	5	0	1+3	0	0+0	0	0+0	0	1+0	0
6	DF	(Northern Ireland) NIR	Ryan Johnson	45	4	40+0	4	1+0	0	1+1	0	2+0	0
7	FW	(England) ENG	James Tilley	14	2	11+2	2	0+0	0	0+0	0	0+1	0
8	MF	(England) ENG	Callum Maycock	47	3	23+15	2	1+0	0	2+0	0	6+0	1
9	FW	(Lebanon) LBN	Omar Bugiel	47	7	20+19	5	1+0	0	2+0	1	3+2	1
10	FW	(Northern Ireland) NIR	Josh Kelly	3	0	1+0	0	0+0	0	0+2	0	0+0	0
11	FW	(England) ENG	Marcus Browne	39	14	32+3	12	0+1	0	0+0	0	2+1	2
12	MF	(England) ENG	Alistair Smith	50	3	45+0	2	1+0	0	0+1	0	3+0	1
14	FW	(England) ENG	Matty Stevens	31	10	20+8	9	0+0	0	0+1	0	1+1	1
15	DF	(Germany) GER	Patrick Bauer	29	0	16+7	0	0+0	0	0+0	0	6+0	0
16	FW	(England) ENG	Antwoine Hackford	44	6	5+31	3	1+0	0	2+0	1	4+1	2
17	DF	(England) ENG	Brodi Hughes	2	0	0+0	0	0+0	0	0+0	0	1+1	0
18	MF	(Jamaica) JAM	Delano McCoy-Splatt	4	0	0+0	0	0+1	0	1+0	0	2+0	0
19	FW	(England) ENG	Osman Foyo	9	0	0+5	0	0+0	0	0+0	0	1+3	0
20	GK	(England) ENG	Joe McDonnell	16	0	8+0	0	0+0	0	2+0	0	6+0	0
21	MF	(Grenada) GRN	Myles Hippolyte	42	3	32+5	2	0+1	0	0+2	0	1+1	1
22	DF	(England) ENG	Riley Horan	1	0	0+0	0	0+0	0	0+0	0	1+0	0
23	DF	(England) ENG	Leo Young	1	0	0+0	0	0+0	0	0+0	0	0+1	0
29	FW	(Norway) NOR	Aron Sasu	25	4	5+14	0	1+0	0	2+0	0	2+1	4
30	FW	(Spain) ESP	Junior Nkeng	30	2	13+11	2	0+0	0	1+0	0	2+3	0
31	DF	(Wales) WAL	Joe Lewis	32	1	24+2	0	1+0	0	0+0	0	4+1	1
32	MF	(England) ENG	Kai Jennings	8	1	1+4	0	0+0	0	0+0	0	1+2	1
33	DF	(England) ENG	Isaac Ogundere	52	0	45+1	0	0+1	0	2+0	0	1+2	0
34	MF	(England) ENG	Harry Hedges	1	0	0+0	0	0+0	0	0+0	0	0+1	0
36	FW	(England) ENG	Layton Stewart	5	0	3+2	0	0+0	0	0+0	0	0+0	0
37	MF	(England) ENG	Zack Nelson	19	1	5+14	1	0+0	0	0+0	0	0+0	0
Player(s) who featured but departed the club permanently during the season:
7	FW	(England) ENG	Danilo Orsi	25	4	8+10	3	0+1	0	2+0	0	3+1	1
26	DF	(England) ENG	Riley Harbottle	18	0	4+8	0	1+0	0	2+0	0	3+0	0
