= Zack Nelson =

English footballer (born 2005)

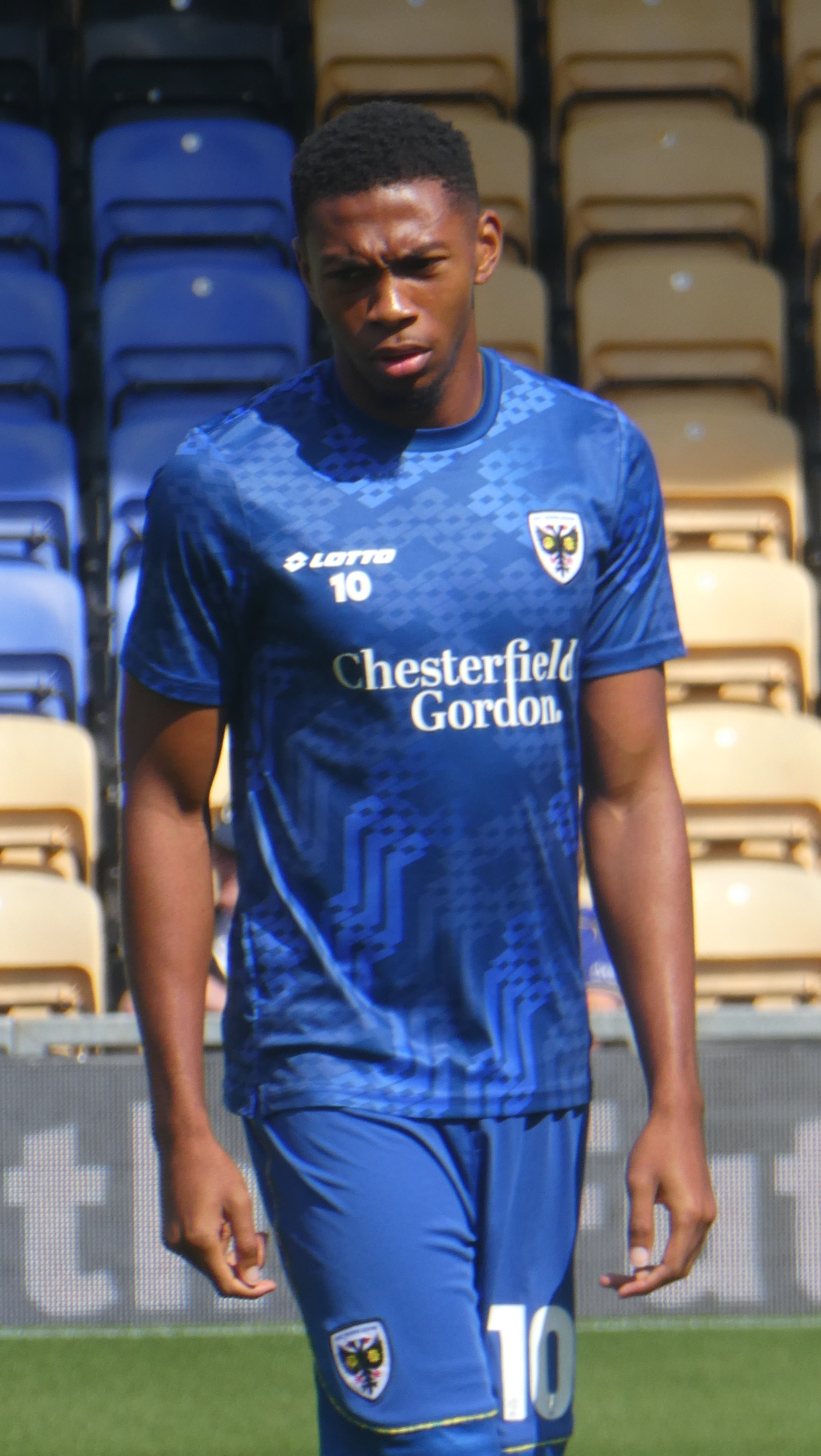
- Nelson playing for AFC Wimbledon in 2026

Personal information
- Full name: Zack Mark Anthony Emeka Nelson
- Date of birth: 21 April 2005 (age 21)
- Place of birth: Camden, England
- Height: 6 ft 0 in (1.83 m)
- Position: Midfielder

Team information
- Current team: AFC Wimbledon
- Number: 10

Youth career
- 2012–2020: Tottenham Hotspur
- 2020–2024: Luton Town

Senior career*
Years	Team	Apps	(Gls)
2024–2026	Luton Town	41	(1)
2026	→ AFC Wimbledon (loan)	19	(1)
2026–	AFC Wimbledon	13	(0)

International career^{‡}
2024	England U20	5	(0)
- * Club domestic league appearances and goals as of 1 November 2026 (UTC) ‡ National team caps and goals as of 13:40, 12 December 2024 (UTC)

Zack Mark Anthony Emeka Nelson (born 21 April 2005) is an English professional footballer who plays as a midfielder for EFL League One club AFC Wimbledon.

== Club career ==
=== Luton Town ===
Nelson was a youth product of Tottenham Hotspur from the age of 7 to 15, before finishing his development with Luton Town after a successful trial. He rose up their youth categories and started training with their senior team in September 2022. On 6 March 2023, he signed his first development contract with Luton Town. On 31 January 2024, he extended his contract with the club. Nelson made his senior and professional debut with Luton Town as a late substitute in a 1–1 Premier League draw with Crystal Palace on 9 March 2024.

==== AFC Wimbledon (loan) ====
On 20 January 2026, Nelson joined League One club AFC Wimbledon on loan until the end of the 2025–26 season.

On 8 May 2026, Luton Town announced that Nelson would leave in the summer following the expiration of his contract.

=== AFC Wimbledon ===
On 24 June 2026, Nelson agreed a two-year deal to join AFC Wimbledon on a permanent deal.

== International career ==
In September 2024, Nelson made his debut for England U20 starting in a victory against Romania at Edgeley Park.

== Career statistics ==
As of match played 12 September 2026

Appearances and goals by club, season and competition
Club	Season	League			FA Cup		EFL Cup		Other		Total	
Club	Season	Division	Apps	Goals	Apps	Goals	Apps	Goals	Apps	Goals	Apps	Goals
Luton Town	2023–24	Premier League	2	0	0	0	0	0	—		2	0
Luton Town	2024–25	Championship	21	0	1	0	1	1	—		23	1
Luton Town	2025–26	League One	18	1	2	0	1	1	4 (Note: Appearance(s) in EFL Trophy)	1	25	3
Luton Town	Total		41	1	3	0	2	2	4	1	50	4
AFC Wimbledon (loan)	2025–26	League One	18	1	–		–		0	0	18	1
AFC Wimbledon	2026–27	League One	6	0	0	0	2	0	1	0	9	0
Career total			65	2	3	0	4	2	5	1	77	5
