= Isaac Ogundere =

English footballer (born 2002)

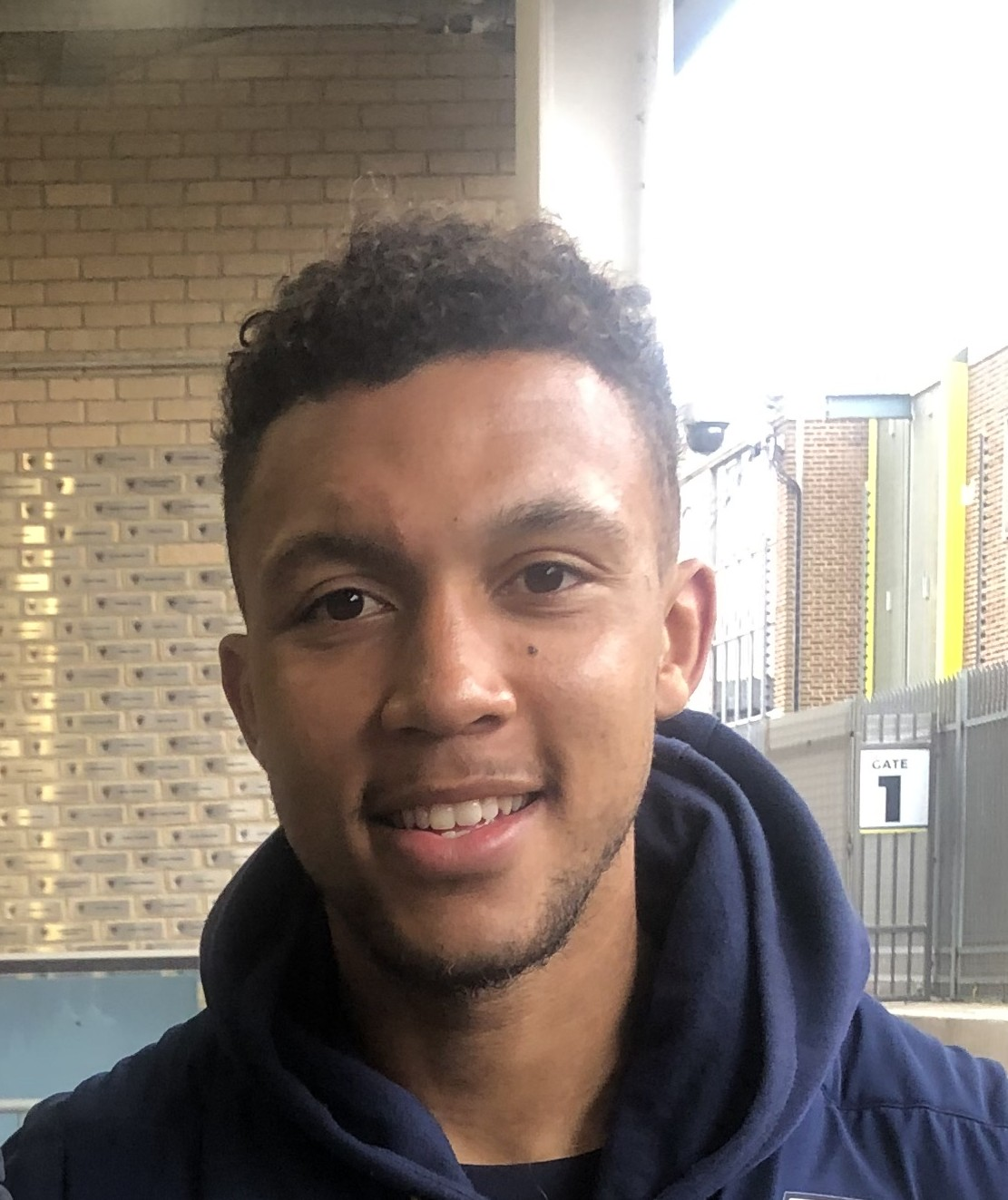
- Ogundere in 2025

Personal information
- Full name: Isaac Ifeoluwa Foloronso Olushore Ogundere
- Date of birth: 6 November 2002 (age 24)
- Place of birth: Hillingdon, England
- Height: 1.77 m (5 ft 10 in)
- Positions: Centre-back; right-back

Team information
- Current team: AFC Wimbledon
- Number: 33

Youth career
- Brentford
- Hayes & Yeading United
- 2017–2021: AFC Wimbledon

Senior career*
Years	Team	Apps	(Gls)
2021–	AFC Wimbledon	140	(0)
2021–2022	→ Leatherhead (loan)	15	(0)
2022	→ Potters Bar Town (loan)	19	(0)
2023	→ Dartford (loan)	5	(0)
- * Club domestic league appearances and goals as of 1 November 2026 (UTC)

Isaac Ifeoluwa Foloronso Olushore Ogundere (born 6 November 2002) is an English professional footballer who plays as a right-back for EFL League One club AFC Wimbledon.

== Early life ==
From London, Ogundere competed in athletics for the London Borough of Harrow. He was in the youth football academy of Brentford.

== Career ==
=== AFC Wimbledon ===
Having previously captained the AFC Wimbledon at under-18 level after being picked up from Hayes & Yeading, Ogundere signed a first professional contract with AFC Wimbledon in July 2021.

He made his professional debut in the EFL Cup for AFC Wimbledon at home at Plough Lane against Gillingham on 9 August 2022. Shortly after on 16 August 2022 he made his League Two debut for AFC Wimbledon as a second-half substitute away at Mansfield. In 2024, he surpassed 50 Wimbledon appearances in all competitions, at the age of 21 years-old. He was part of Wimbledon side which won promotion into EFL League One in the 2024-25 season, playing 50 matches in all competitions and going past 100 league appearances for the club. In October 2025, he signed a new two-year contract with the club.

==== Loans ====
Ogundere signed for Leatherhead on loan at the start of the 2021–22 season. Ogundere scored for Leatherhead in the FA Cup against Amersham Town in October 2021. He later spent time on loan at Potters Bar Town during the 2021–22 season.

In February 2023, Ogundere joined Dartford in the National League South for the rest of the 2022–23 season, but was recalled after a short spell due to first-team injuries at AFC Wimbledon.

== Career statistics ==
As of matches played 22 August 2026

Club	Season	Division	League		FA Cup		EFL Cup		Other		Total	
Club	Season	Division	Apps	Goals	Apps	Goals	Apps	Goals	Apps	Goals	Apps	Goals
AFC Wimbledon	2021–22	League One	0	0	0	0	0	0	0	0	0	0
AFC Wimbledon	2022–23	League Two	15	0	2	0	1	0	3 (Note: Appearances in EFL Trophy)	0	21	0
AFC Wimbledon	2023–24	League Two	31	0	2	0	2	0	4	0	39	0
AFC Wimbledon	2024–25	League Two	39	0	1	0	3	0	7	0	50	0
AFC Wimbledon	2025–26	League One	46	0	1	0	2	0	3	0	52	0
AFC Wimbledon	2026–27	League One	2	0	0	0	1	0	1	0	4	0
AFC Wimbledon	Total		133	0	6	0	9	0	18	0	166	0
Leatherhead (loan)	2021–22	Isthmian League Premier Division	15	0	2	1	—		1 (Note: Appearance in FA Trophy)	0	18	1
Potters Bar Town (loan)	2021–22	Isthmian League Premier Division	19	0	—		—		—		19	0
Dartford (loan)	2022–23	National League South	5	0	—		—		0	0	5	0
Career total			172	0	8	1	9	0	19	0	208	1

== Honours ==
AFC Wimbledon

- EFL League Two play-offs: 2025
