= Freddie Simmonds =

English footballer (born 2008)

Personal information
- Full name: Freddie James Simmonds
- Date of birth: 9 March 2008 (age 18)
- Place of birth: England
- Height: 6 ft 2 in (1.89 m)
- Position: Defender

Team information
- Current team: AFC Wimbledon (on loan from Brighton & Hove Albion)
- Number: 15

Youth career
- 2014–2026: Brighton & Hove Albion

Senior career*
Years	Team	Apps	(Gls)
2025–	Brighton & Hove Albion	0	(0)
2026–	→ AFC Wimbledon (loan)	4	(0)

International career^{‡}
2023–2024	England U16	9	(2)
2023–2025	England U17	19	(2)
2025–	England U18	7	(0)
- * Club domestic league appearances and goals as of 21 November 2026 ‡ National team caps and goals as of 15:23, 31 March 2026 (UTC)

Freddie James Simmonds (born 9 March 2008) is an English professional footballer who plays as a defender for EFL League One club AFC Wimbledon, on loan from the academy of Premier League club Brighton & Hove Albion.

== Early life ==
Simmonds was born on 9 March 2008 in England. Growing up, he supported Brighton & Hove Albion.

== Club career ==
As a youth player, Simmonds joined the youth academy of Brighton & Hove Albion at the age of six.

== International career ==
Simmonds is an England youth international. During May 2025, he played for England U17 at the 2025 UEFA European Under-17 Championship and started in their last group game against Czech Republic. Later that year Simmonds was included in the England squad for the 2025 FIFA U-17 World Cup starting all five of their games at the tournament including the round of sixteen defeat against Austria.

== Style of play ==
Simmonds plays as a defender. Spanish news website Vavel wrote in 2025 that "he is the definition of a modern-day defender... has everything you need to survive and thrive in the modern game... tackling, marking, strength, and heading... also excellent on the ball with his passing and dribbling".

== Career statistics ==
As of match played 21 November 2026

Appearances and goals by club, season and competition
Club	Season	League			National Cup		League Cup		Other		Total	
Club	Season	Division	Apps	Goals	Apps	Goals	Apps	Goals	Apps	Goals	Apps	Goals
Brighton & Hove Albion U21s	2024–25	—							2 (Note: Appearances in the EFL Trophy)	0	2	0
Brighton & Hove Albion U21s	2025–26	—							1	0	1	0
Brighton & Hove Albion U21s	2026–27	—							1	0	1	0
Brighton & Hove Albion U21s	Total	—							4	0	4	0
AFC Wimbledon (loan)	2026–27	League One	4	0	0	0	0	0	1	0	5	0
Career total			4	0	0	0	0	0	5	0	9	0
