= Myles Hippolyte =

Grenadian-English footballer (born 1994)

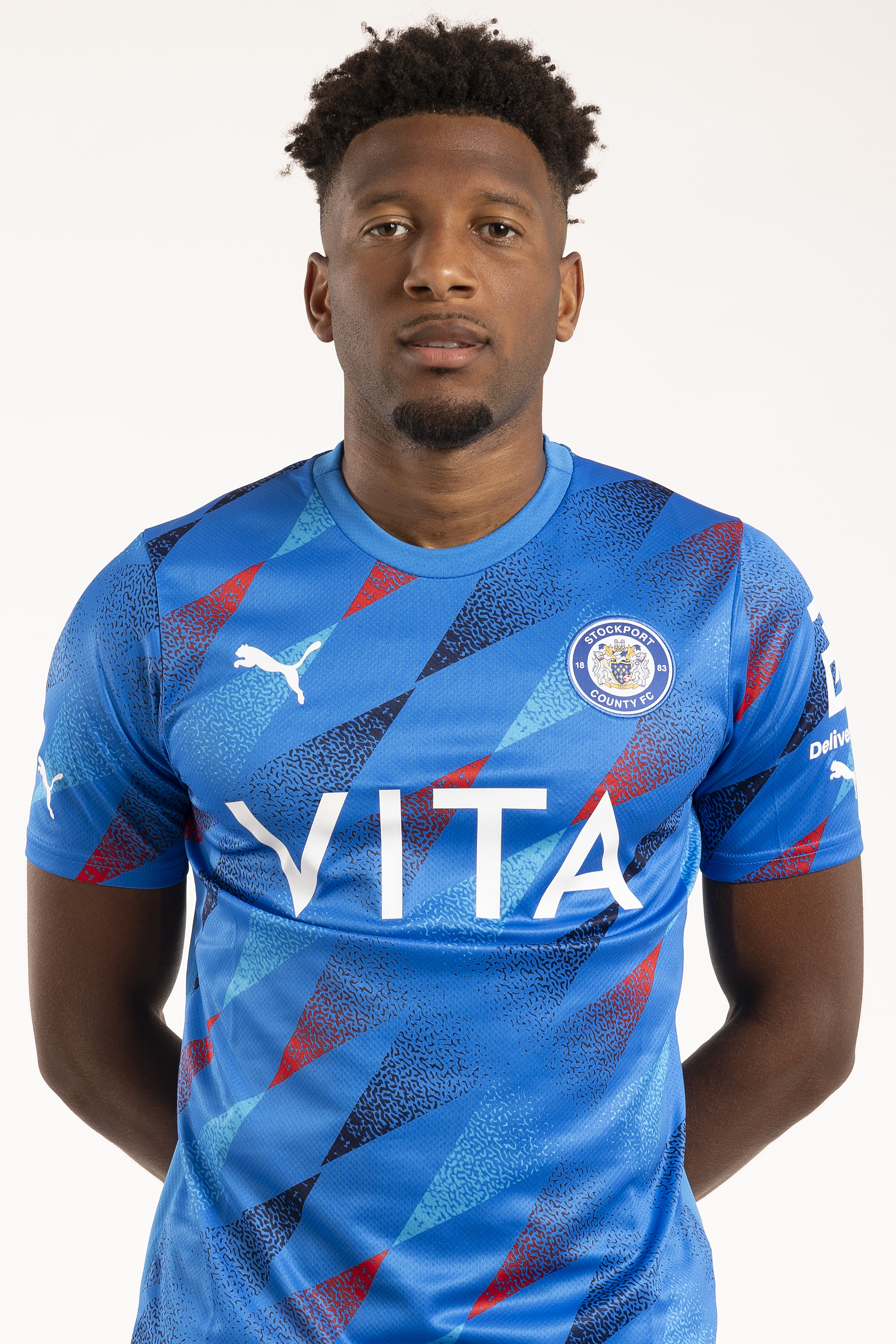
- Hippolyte while with Stockport County

Personal information
- Full name: Myles Elliot Zach Hippolyte
- Date of birth: 9 November 1994 (age 32)
- Place of birth: Harrow, England
- Height: 6 ft 0 in (1.83 m)
- Positions: Midfielder; winger

Team information
- Current team: AFC Wimbledon
- Number: 21

Youth career
- 2007–2010: Westway
- 2010–2013: Brentford

Senior career*
Years	Team	Apps	(Gls)
2013	Brentford	0	(0)
2013	→ Southall (loan)	2	(2)
2013	Southall	1	(0)
2013	Tamworth	0	(0)
2013–2014	Hayes & Yeading United	1	(0)
2014	Burnham	14	(4)
2014	Southall	1	(0)
2014–2016	Livingston	50	(3)
2016–2018	Falkirk	52	(10)
2018	St Mirren	8	(1)
2018–2019	Dunfermline Athletic	31	(2)
2019–2020	Yeovil Town	31	(5)
2020–2022	Scunthorpe United	48	(5)
2022–2024	Stockport County	80	(7)
2024–	AFC Wimbledon	68	(7)

International career^{‡}
2023–	Grenada	13	(6)
- * Club domestic league appearances and goals as of 1 November 2026 (UTC) ‡ National team caps and goals as of 23:17, 29 September 2026 (UTC)

Myles Elliot Zach Hippolyte (born 9 November 1994) is a professional footballer who plays as a winger for EFL League One club AFC Wimbledon. Born in England, he represents Grenada at international level.

A product of the Brentford Academy, Hippolyte moved to Scotland in 2014 and played for Livingston, Falkirk and St Mirren, before joining for Dunfermline Athletic in 2018. He returned to England a year later to play for Yeovil Town, before moving into the English Football League with Scunthorpe United, Stockport County and AFC Wimbledon. Born in England, Hippolyte declared his international allegiance to Grenada and made his full international debut in 2023.

== Club career ==
=== Brentford ===
A forward, Hippolyte began his career as a schoolboy at Harrow Youth League club Westway in London. He also had brief spells at Fulham, Queens Park Rangers and Reading. He joined the youth system at League One club Brentford in 2010 and signed a scholarship deal on 27 June 2011. In his first season as a scholar, Hippolyte was part of the youth team which advanced to the fourth round of the 2011–12 FA Youth Cup. Hippolyte scored prolifically for the youth team and topped the team's goalscoring charts in both his seasons as a scholar.

Hippolyte joined Spartan South Midlands League First Division club Southall on a work experience loan deal on 11 January 2013. He scored on his debut versus London Lions the following day, with a late equaliser in a 2–2 draw. His second and final goal for the club came in a 2–0 win over Kings Langley on 5 March, for which he won the man of the match award. Hippolyte returned to Brentford when his loan expired, having scored two goals in four appearances. He was released at the end of the 2012–13 season, after failing to be offered a professional contract. Looking back in October 2014, Hippolyte said "off the pitch I was slack. I was late to training and wasn't switched on enough. It was the worst possible outcome because if it was due to lack of ability I could've accepted it".

=== Return to Southall ===
After unsuccessful trials at Cambridge United, Blackburn Rovers, Oxford United, Charlton Athletic and York City, Hippolyte returned to Southall in November 2013. He made one appearance in a 0–0 league draw with Arlesey Town Reserves on 16 November. He later returned and made a further appearance towards the end of the 2013–14 season, in a 0–0 draw with Risborough Rangers on 1 May 2014.

=== Tamworth ===
Hippolyte joined Conference Premier club Tamworth on trial in November 2013. He signed non-contract terms and made his debut for the club with a start in a 1–0 Birmingham Senior Cup first round win over Coleshill Town on 19 November. After further training with the club, Hippolyte was called into the squad for an FA Trophy match versus Boston United on 14 December, but remained an unused substitute. He departed after the club declined to offer him a contract.

=== Hayes & Yeading United ===
Hippolyte joined Conference South club Hayes & Yeading United on 31 December 2013. He made his only appearance for the club as a substitute in a 3–1 defeat to Concord Rangers on 11 January 2014. In a period hit by postponements due to the weather, Hippolyte departed the club in late January 2014.

=== Burnham ===
In late January 2014, Hippolyte signed for Southern League Premier Division strugglers Burnham and scored four goals in 14 appearances before the end of the 2013–14 season.

=== Livingston ===
On 10 July 2014, Hippolyte signed for Scottish Championship club Livingston on a one-year deal, after impressing manager John McGlynn while on trial. Hippolyte's debut for the club (the first professional appearance of his career) came in a Scottish Challenge Cup first round match versus Queen of the South on 26 July 2014. With the score at 2–2, he came on as a 70th-minute substitute for Gary Glen. In the extra time period, Hippolyte scored his first competitive goal for the club in an eventual 4–3 win and he went on to score four goals in his first eight games. Hippolyte started in the 4–0 2015 Scottish Challenge Cup Final victory over Alloa Athletic and won the first silverware of his career. He finished the 2014–15 season with 42 appearances and six goals, as Livingston escaped relegation on the final day of the season. In late June 2015, he signed a new one-year contract.

Hippolyte began his 2015–16 season with what proved to be the winning goal in a 2–1 victory over Clyde in the first round of Livingston's defence of the Scottish Challenge Cup. He began the season as a starter, before reverting to a substitute role in October 2015. He departed the Almondvale Stadium on 29 January 2016, after making 64 appearances and scoring 8 goals in 18 months with Livingston.

=== Falkirk ===
On 29 January 2016, Hippolyte joined Scottish Championship club Falkirk for an undisclosed fee. His first goal for the club came versus Rangers on 18 March, with the second goal of a 3–2 comeback victory. He made 15 appearances during the remainder of the 2015–16 season as Falkirk failed to win promotion to the Scottish Premiership via the Scottish Premiership playoffs.

Hippolyte scored eight goals in 35 appearances during the 2016–17 season, as once again the club failed to win promotion through the Scottish Premiership playoffs. He scored six goals in 16 appearances during the first half of the 2017–18 season, before being dropped in January 2018 and leaving the club at the end of the month. During his two years at the Falkirk Stadium, Hippolyte made 66 appearances and scored 15 goals.

=== St Mirren & Dunfermline Athletic ===
On 31 January 2018, Hippolyte joined Scottish Championship club St Mirren on an 18-month contract. He scored his only goal for the Buddies on his sixth appearance, with a penalty in a 2–1 defeat to former club Falkirk on 17 April 2018 and celebrated promotion to the Scottish Premiership at the end of the season. Hippolyte departed St Mirren Park in July 2018, after making just 8 appearances during the second half of the 2017–18 season.

On 13 July 2018, Hippolyte moved to Scottish Championship club Dunfermline Athletic on a two-year contract. He made 39 appearances and scored six goals during the 2018–19 season, with four of the goals coming in his first four appearances of the campaign. On 28 May 2019, it was announced that Hippolyte's contract had been terminated by mutual consent.

=== Yeovil Town ===
After a successful trial period, Hippolyte returned to England to sign a one-year contract with National League club Yeovil Town on a free transfer on 29 July 2019. He made 37 appearances and scored five goals during a 2019–20 season which culminated in defeat in the National League playoff quarter-finals. Hippolyte was retained for the 2020–21 season, but elected to transfer away from Huish Park in August 2020.

=== Scunthorpe United ===
On 29 August 2020, Hippolyte transferred to League Two club Scunthorpe United and signed a two-year contract for an undisclosed fee. During 18 months at Glanford Park, he made 55 appearances and scored five goals.

=== Stockport County ===
On 31 January 2022, Hippolyte joined National League club Stockport County on a free transfer and signed a contract running until the end of the 2021–22 season. He made 20 appearances and scored four goals during a season which culminated with the Hatters won the National League championship, which secured promotion to the English Football League. Hippolyte signed a new two-year contract in June 2022 and made a season-high 55 appearances, scoring two goals, during a 2022–23 season which culminated in defeat in the 2023 League Two playoff final.

A ruptured fibular collateral ligament suffered in June 2023 saw Hippolyte withdrawn from the 2023–24 pre-season campaign for recuperation and he returned to match play on 21 October 2023. On his fourth appearance back, he suffered another injury, which saw him miss a further three months. Hippolyte ended the League Two championship-winning 2023–24 season with 19 appearances and was released when his contract expired. During 2 1/2 years at Edgeley Park, Hippolyte made 94 appearances and scored 9 goals.

=== AFC Wimbledon ===
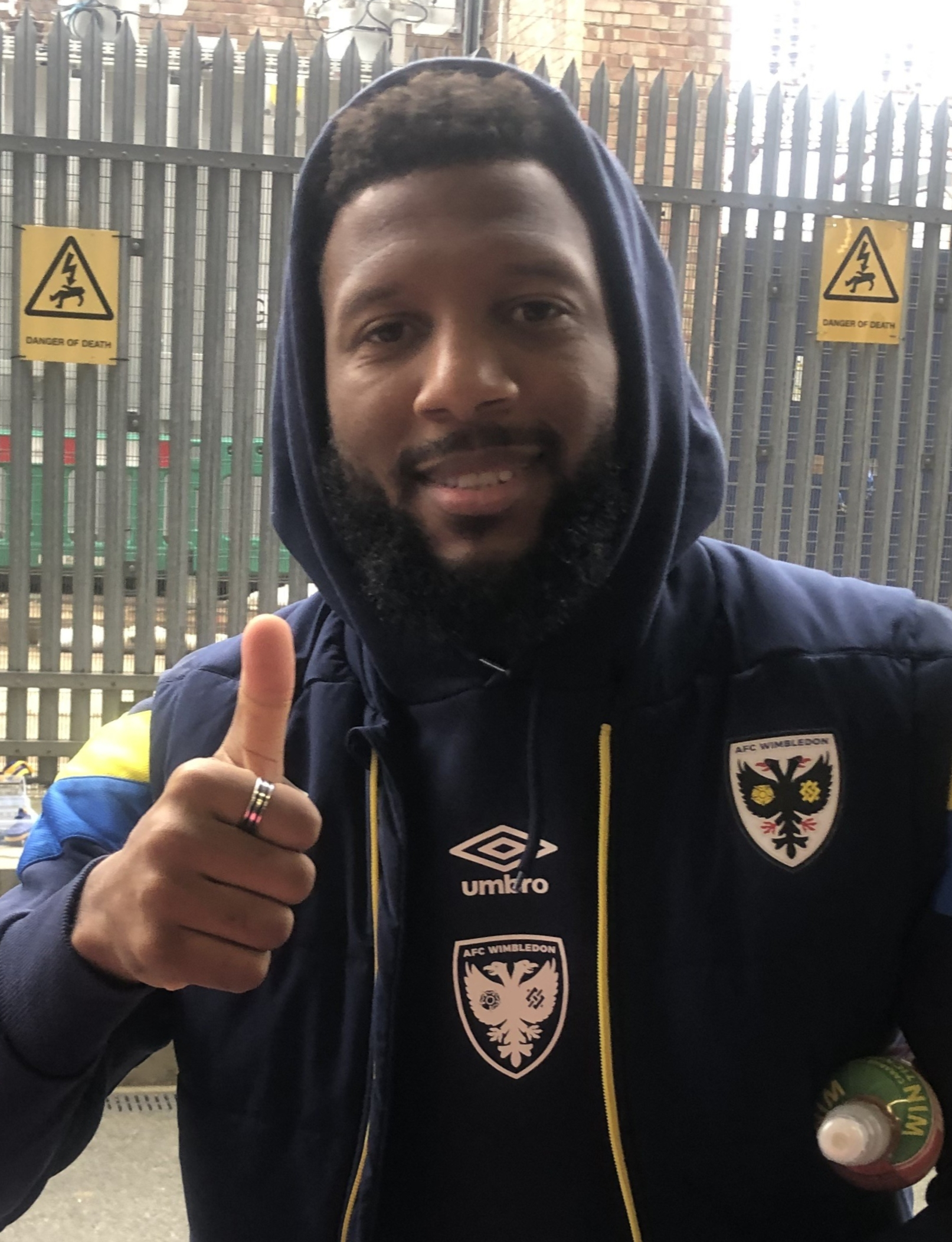
Hippolyte while with AFC Wimbledon in 2025.

On 28 May 2024, Hippolyte transferred to League Two club AFC Wimbledon and signed a two-year contract, with the option of a further year, effective 1 July 2024. Hippolyte made 26 appearances and scored two goals during the 2024–25 season, which culminated in victory in the 2025 League Two playoff final, in which he scored the only goal. Hippolyte made 42 appearances and scored three goals during the 2025–26 season, in which the club narrowly avoided relegation from League One. In May 2026, the option on his contract was exercised by the club.

== International career ==
Hippolyte is eligible to represent England, Saint Lucia or Grenada at international level. He was one of a handful of players the Grenada Football Association attempted to recruit ahead of 2018 FIFA World Cup qualifiers versus Puerto Rico in June 2015. In March 2023, Hippolyte was named in the Grenada squad for a 2022–23 CONCACAF Nations League A group match versus the United States and he scored what proved to be a consolation goal in a 7–1 defeat.

== Personal life ==
Hippolyte is of Grenadian descent on his mother's side and Saint Lucian on his father's. His father's cousin is former footballer and current manager Johnson Hippolyte. He attended Twyford Church of England High School.

== Career statistics ==
=== Club ===
As of match played 17 September 2026

Appearances and goals by club, season and competition
Club	Season	League			National cup (Note: Includes Scottish Cup, FA Cup)		League cup (Note: Includes Scottish League Cup, EFL Cup)		Other		Total	
Club	Season	Division	Apps	Goals	Apps	Goals	Apps	Goals	Apps	Goals	Apps	Goals
Brentford	2012–13	League One	0	0	0	0	0	0	0	0	0	0
Southall (loan)	2012–13	Spartan South Midlands League; First Division	2	2	—		—		1 (Note: Appearance in Middlesex Premier Cup)	0	3	2
Southall	2013–14	Spartan South Midlands League; First Division	2	0	—		—		0	0	2	0
Southall	Total		4	2	—		—		1	0	5	2
Tamworth	2013–14	Conference Premier	0	0	—		—		1 (Note: Appearance in Birmingham Senior Cup)	0	1	0
Hayes & Yeading United	2013–14	Conference South	1	0	—		—		—		1	0
Burnham	2013–14	Southern League; Premier Division	14	4	—		—		—		14	4
Livingston	2014–15	Scottish Championship	33	2	1	0	3	1	5 (Note: Appearances in Scottish Challenge Cup)	3	42	6
Livingston	2015–16	Scottish Championship	17	1	1	0	2	0	2	1	22	2
Livingston	Total		50	3	2	0	5	1	7	4	64	8
Falkirk	2015–16	Scottish Championship	12	1	—		—		3 (Note: Appearances in Scottish Premiership play-offs)	0	15	1
Falkirk	2016–17	Scottish Championship	30	7	1	0	1	0	3 (Note: 2 appearances and 1 goal in Scottish Challenge Cup, 1 appearance in Scottish Premiership play-offs)	1	35	8
Falkirk	2017–18	Scottish Championship	10	2	0	0	4	3	2	1	16	6
Falkirk	Total		52	10	1	0	5	3	8	2	66	15
St Mirren	2017–18	Scottish Championship	8	1	—		—		—		8	1
Dunfermline Athletic	2018–19	Scottish Championship	31	2	1	0	5	4	2	0	39	6
Yeovil Town	2019–20	National League	31	5	2	0	—		4 (Note: 3 appearances in FA Trophy, 1 appearance in National League play-offs)	0	37	5
Scunthorpe United	2020–21	League Two	26	1	0	0	0	0	2 (Note: Appearance(s) in EFL Trophy)	0	28	1
Scunthorpe United	2021–22	League Two	22	4	1	0	1	0	3	0	27	4
Scunthorpe United	Total		48	5	1	0	1	0	5	0	55	5
Stockport County	2021–22	National League	18	3	—		—		2 (Note: Appearances in FA Trophy)	1	20	4
Stockport County	2022–23	League Two	44	4	4	1	2	0	5 (Note: 3 appearances in League Two play-offs, 2 appearances in EFL Trophy)	0	55	5
Stockport County	2023–24	League Two	18	0	1	0	0	0	0	0	19	0
Stockport County	Total		80	7	5	1	2	0	7	0	94	9
AFC Wimbledon	2024–25	League Two	19	2	1	0	2	0	4 (Note: 3 appearances and 1 goal in League Two play-offs, 1 appearance in EFL Trophy)	1	26	3
AFC Wimbledon	2025–26	League One	37	2	1	0	2	0	2	1	42	3
AFC Wimbledon	2026–27	League One	7	3	0	0	2	0	1	0	10	3
AFC Wimbledon	Total		63	7	2	0	6	0	7	2	78	9
Career total			382	46	14	1	24	8	42	9	462	64

=== International ===
As of match played 29 September 2026

Appearances and goals by national team and year
National team	Year	Apps	Goals
Grenada	2023	2	1
Grenada	2024	6	3
Grenada	2025	2	2
Grenada	2026	3	0
Total		13	6

Scores and results list Grenada's goal tally first, score column indicates score after each Hippolyte goal.

List of international goals scored by Myles Hippolyte
No.	Date	Venue	Opponent	Score	Result	Competition	Ref.
1	25 March 2023	Kirani James Athletic Stadium, St. George's, Grenada	United States	1–3	1–7	2022–23 CONCACAF Nations League A	
2	6 June 2024	Hasely Crawford Stadium, Port of Spain, Trinidad and Tobago	Trinidad and Tobago	1–0	2–2	2026 FIFA World Cup qualification	
3	6 June 2024	Hasely Crawford Stadium, Port of Spain, Trinidad and Tobago	Trinidad and Tobago	2–0	2–2	2026 FIFA World Cup qualification	
4	9 October 2025	Kirani James Athletics Stadium, St. George's, Grenada	British Virgin Islands	1–0	4–1	Friendly	
5	9 October 2025	Kirani James Athletics Stadium, St. George's, Grenada	British Virgin Islands	2–0	4–1	Friendly	

== Honours ==
Livingston

- Scottish Challenge Cup: 2014–15

St Mirren

- Scottish Championship: 2017–18

Stockport County

- EFL League Two: 2023–24
- National League: 2021–22

AFC Wimbledon

- EFL League Two play-offs: 2025
