= Osman Foyo =

Dutch footballer (born 2004)

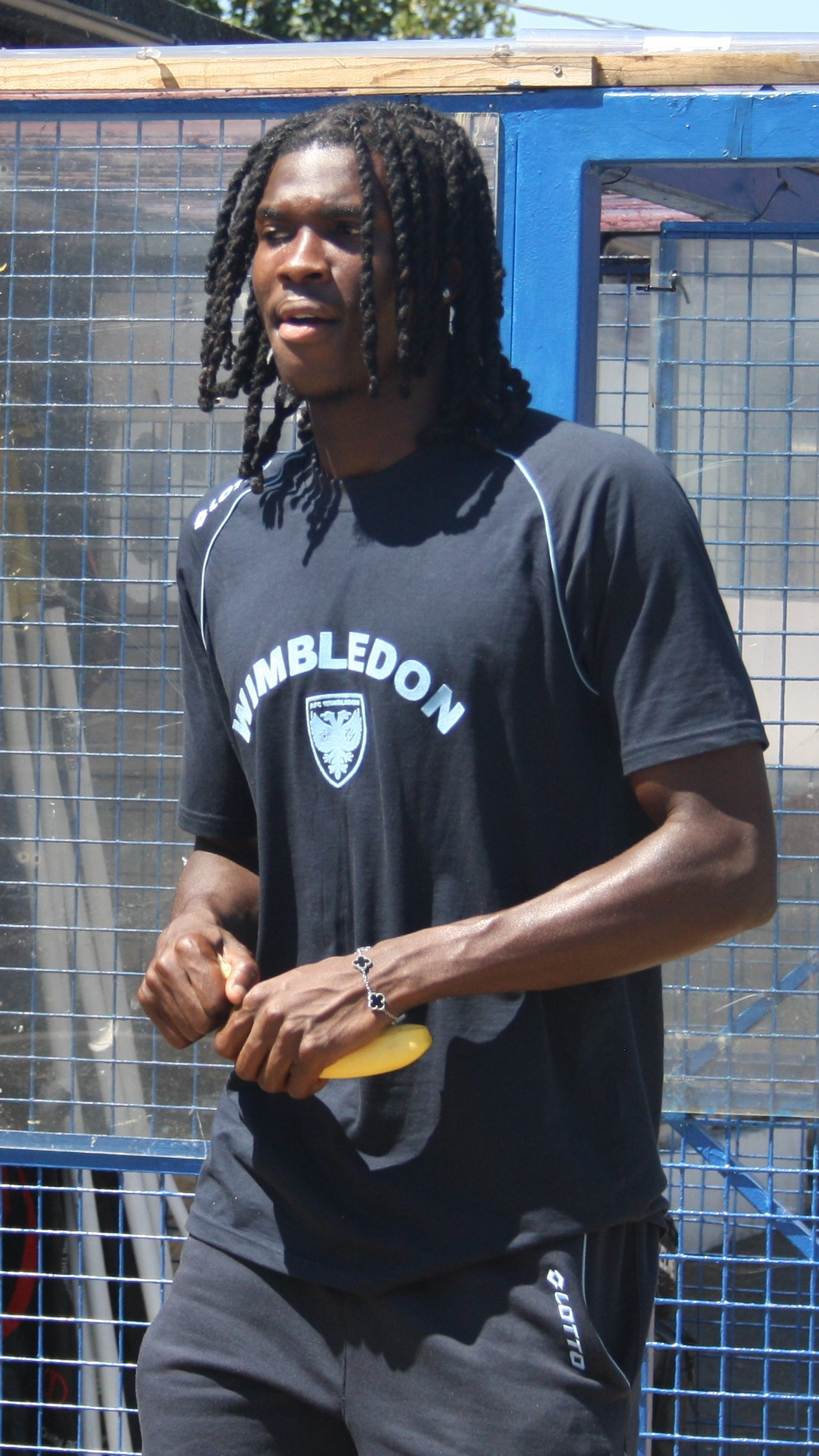
- Foyo with AFC Wimbledon in 2025.

Personal information
- Full name: Osman Sidibay Foyo
- Date of birth: 3 October 2004 (age 22)
- Place of birth: Utrecht, Netherlands
- Height: 1.84 m (6 ft 0 in)
- Positions: Forward; midfielder

Team information
- Current team: Rhode Island FC
- Number: 18

Youth career
- Chelsea
- –2023: Norwich City
- 2022–2023: → Ipswich Town (loan)

Senior career*
Years	Team	Apps	(Gls)
2023–2025	Ipswich Town	0	(0)
2023–2024	→ Torquay United (loan)	3	(0)
2024	→ Welling United (loan)	4	(0)
2024–2025	→ Chelmsford City (loan)	21	(12)
2025–2026	AFC Wimbledon	11	(0)
2025	→ Sutton United (loan)	2	(0)
2026	→ Sutton United (loan)	8	(2)
2026–	Rhode Island FC	12	(1)
- * Club domestic league appearances and goals as of 15:17, 8 November 2026 (UTC)

Osman Sidibay Foyo (born 3 October 2004) is a Dutch professional footballer who plays as a forward for Rhode Island FC in the USL Championship.

Foyo began his career in the youth setup of Chelsea before leaving for Norwich City. He was then loaned to rivals Ipswich Town before the move was made permanent in 2023. He was then loaned to National League South clubs Torquay United, Welling United and Chelmsford City. Following a successful loan with Chelmsford City where he scored 13 times in 23 games, he signed for League Two side AFC Wimbledon in 2025. He subsequently spent parts of the 25/26 season on loan to National League club Sutton United before joining Rhode Island FC in the summer of 2026.

== Early and personal life ==
Foyo was born in Utrecht, Netherlands but moved to England shortly before his fifth birthday. He is of Sierra Leonan descent—both of his parents are from Sierra Leone. He considers himself Dutch however as he has a Dutch passport. He grew up in Waterloo and Camberwell, and attended Westminster City School. Foyo grew up supporting Manchester United.

== Career ==
=== Early career ===
"It was an amazing experience because I got to see Eden Hazard and David Luiz playing – they were great role models for me. The coaching was also top-class and I had the chance to go on tours abroad, so I enjoyed my time as a boy at Chelsea."

— Foyo on his time at Chelsea.

Foyo began in the youth system of Premier League side Chelsea, signing at the age of 12 following a six-week trial. He left Chelsea at the age of 15, moving to Norwich City, and he secured a scholarship on 1 July 2021. While at Norwich, Foyo was named in The Guardian's 20 best Premier League talents for 2021. He was then sent on a work experience loan to East Anglian rivals Ipswich Town, the move facilitated by Academy Manager Dean Wright, who had formerly worked at Norwich and signed Foyo as a schoolboy. The move was made permanent in January 2023.

=== Ipswich Town and loans ===
Foyo participated in Ipswich's first team pre-season, and scored 5 goals in 9 games for the U21, before being sent out by Ipswich on loan to National League South side Torquay United in 2023. He made his Torquay debut on 23 December, in a 2–0 defeat to Chelmsford City. He made 4 appearances in total before returning to Ipswich. He was subsequently loaned to fellow National League South club Welling United, making his debut on 24 February 2024 in a 1–1 draw against St Albans City.

Foyo travelled to Germany with the Ipswich first team during their pre-season tour in the 2024–25 season, before going on loan to Chelmsford City, once again in the National League South. He made his debut on 17 August in a 1–1 draw against Hampton & Richmond Borough. He scored his first goal on 31 August in a 2–1 loss against Truro City. Foyo scored a brace the next game on 3 September in a 5–1 win against Maidstone United, and scored for the third time in a row in a 3–0 win over Bath City on 7 September, securing back-to-back victories. He scored his eighth goal on 5 November, scoring a last-minute equaliser from 30 yards out in a 1–1 draw against St Albans City. Foyo also then scored in the Essex Senior Cup on 26 November in a 3–2 win against Billericay Town. He returned to Ipswich on 3 January 2025, after scoring 12 times in the league and 13 times in all competitions across 23 matches. Due to his form for Chelmsford, Foyo began to attract interest from a multitude of EFL clubs.

=== AFC Wimbledon ===
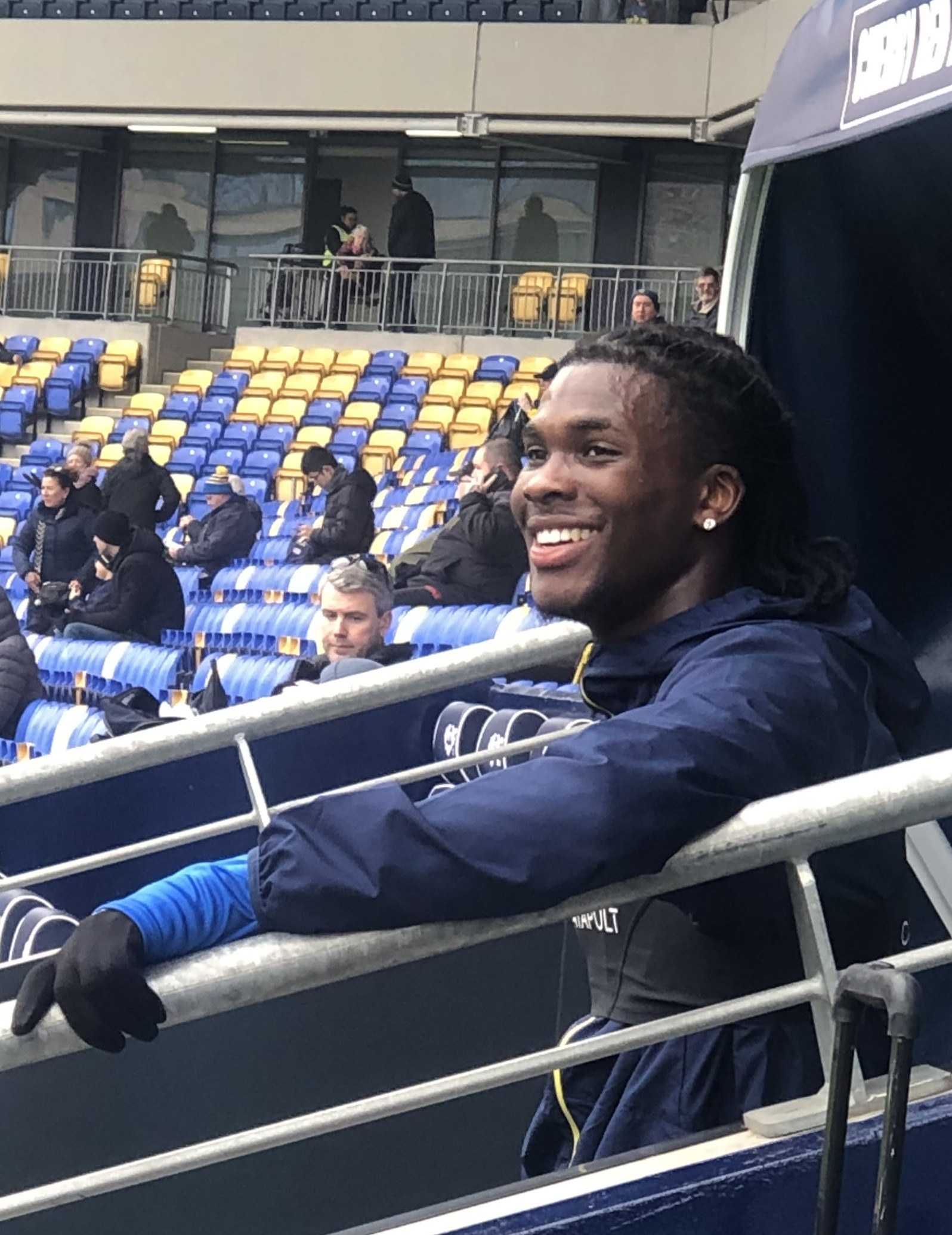
Foyo with AFC Wimbledon in 2025.

On 30 January 2025, it was announced that Foyo had signed on a two and a half year contract with League Two side AFC Wimbledon. He made his debut on 11 February in a 3–0 win over Crewe Alexandra, coming on for Matty Stevens near the end of the match. He made his first start for Wimbledon on 21 April in a 1–0 defeat to Gillingham. He finished the season with 6 appearances for Wimbledon.

On 10 July 2025, The Football Association informed Wimbledon that Foyo had been charged in relation to alleged breaches of their betting rules. He was imposed a £1,000 fine and suspended from footballing activity for five months in October, four of which were suspended.

In November 2025, Foyo joined National League club Sutton United on loan until January 2026. He made his Sutton debut on 16 November, in a 2–0 win over FC Halifax Town. On 5 December, he returned to his parent club after being handed an additional two-month ban by the Football Association, prohibited from playing competitively until 24 January 2026. On 25 February 2026, Foyo made the return to Sutton United joining on loan for the remainder of the season. He scored his first goal for Sutton on 3 March in a 2–0 win over Hartlepool United.

=== Rhode Island FC ===
On 23 July, 2026, Rhode Island FC of the USL Championship announced they had signed Foyo to a multi-year deal.

== Style of play ==
Foyo is known for his versatility but mainly plays in the forward or midfielder position. He is also acclaimed for his pace and physicality. AFC Wimbledon manager Johnnie Jackson said of Foyo, "He's big, he's powerful, can play wide, can play centrally," and "He's got an eye for a goal, he's left-footed and he's one for the future."

== Career statistics ==
As of match played 11 March 2026

Appearances and goals by club, season and competition
Club	Season	League			FA Cup		EFL Cup		Other		Total	
Club	Season	Division	Apps	Goals	Apps	Goals	Apps	Goals	Apps	Goals	Apps	Goals
Torquay United (loan)	2023–24	National League South	3	0	0	0	—		1 (Note: Appearance(s) in FA Trophy)	0	4	0
Welling United (loan)	2023–24	National League South	4	0	0	0	—		—		4	0
Chelmsford City (loan)	2024–25	National League South	21	12	1	0	—		2 (Note: One appearance in FA Trophy, one appearance in Essex Senior Cup)	1	24	13
AFC Wimbledon	2024–25	League Two	6	0	0	0	0	0	0	0	6	0
AFC Wimbledon	2025–26	League One	0	0	0	0	0	0	4 (Note: Appearance(s) in EFL Trophy)	0	4	0
AFC Wimbledon	Total		6	0	0	0	0	0	4	0	10	0
Sutton United (loan)	2025–26	National League	7	2	0	0	—		0	0	7	2
Career total			41	14	1	0	0	0	7	2	49	16
