= Marcus Browne (footballer) =

English footballer (born 1997)

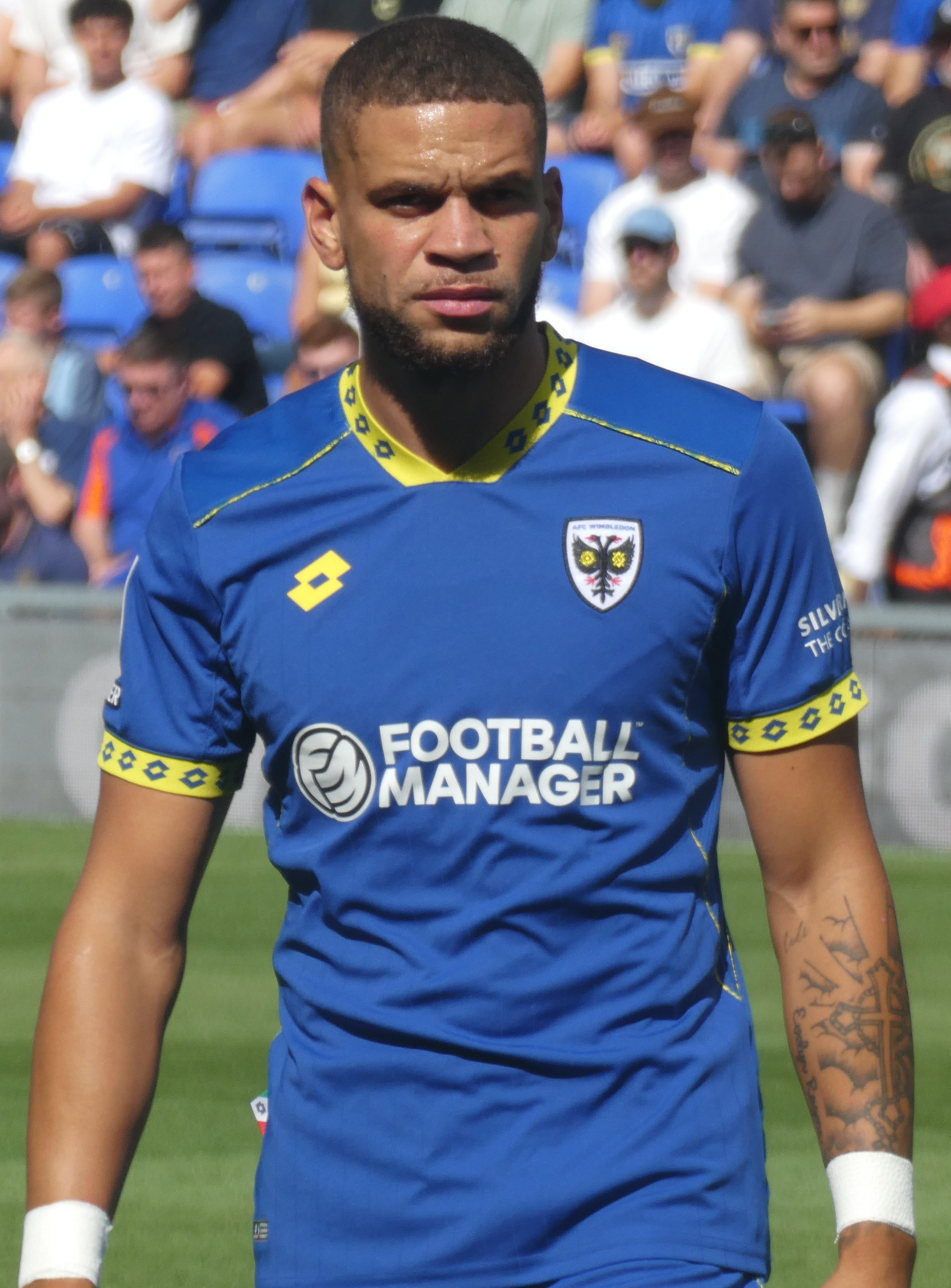
- Browne playing for AFC Wimbledon in 2026

Personal information
- Full name: Marcus Alexander Browne
- Date of birth: 18 December 1997 (age 28)
- Place of birth: Tower Hamlets, England
- Height: 5 ft 10 in (1.78 m)
- Positions: Attacking midfielder; winger

Team information
- Current team: AFC Wimbledon
- Number: 11

Youth career
- 2006–2016: West Ham United

Senior career*
Years	Team	Apps	(Gls)
2016–2019	West Ham United	0	(0)
2017	→ Wigan Athletic (loan)	0	(0)
2018–2019	→ Oxford United (loan)	34	(6)
2019–2022	Middlesbrough	18	(2)
2020	→ Oxford United (loan)	11	(4)
2022–2024	Oxford United	51	(5)
2025–	AFC Wimbledon	58	(16)
- * Club domestic league appearances and goals as of 1 November 2026 (UTC)

Marcus Alexander Browne (born 18 December 1997) is an English professional footballer who plays as a midfielder for EFL League One club AFC Wimbledon. A product of the West Ham United youth academy, he can play in a central attacking midfield role and can also operate on both wings.

== Early life ==
Browne was born in Tower Hamlets and is of Dominican descent.

== Club career ==
=== West Ham United ===
Browne joined West Ham United at the age of eight and progressed through the academy at the club prior to signing his first professional contract on 12 November 2015.

On 18 August 2016, Browne made his senior debut in a Europa League fixture against Astra Giurgiu. The game finished 1–1 and Browne replaced Gökhan Töre in the 75th minute. After making a tackle in the middle of the pitch, Browne ran for around 40 yards (37 m) before passing to teammate Michail Antonio before the right winger missed a clear chance to score.

==== Wigan Athletic (loan) ====
On 20 January 2017, Browne joined struggling Championship club Wigan Athletic on loan until the end of the season. He made his debut and only appearance on 29 January, where he came on as a second-half substitute in their 4–0 FA Cup defeat to Premier League giants Manchester United. Wigan went on to suffer relegation to League One at the end of the divisional campaign.

==== Oxford United (first loan) ====
On 24 July 2018, Browne joined established League One club Oxford United on a season-long loan. He made his league debut, coming on as a substitute, during a 2–0 home defeat to Fleetwood Town, their second game of the season. Browne scored his first goal for Oxford in a convincing 2–0 win against Coventry City on 14 August, in the first round of their EFL Cup campaign. His first league goal, which was referred to as a "superb solo goal", came in a 3–2 home defeat to Accrington Stanley a week later.

By the end of the season, Browne had scored nine goals in 44 appearances throughout all competitions, six of which occurred in his 34 league appearances.

=== Middlesbrough ===
On 26 July 2019, Browne signed a four-year deal with Championship club Middlesbrough for an officially undisclosed transfer fee.

==== Oxford United (second loan) ====
Browne re-joined Oxford United on 9 January 2020 on a loan deal until the end of the 2019–20 season.

=== Oxford United ===
In January 2022 Browne signed a two-and-a-half-year contract with Oxford United for an undisclosed fee. Browne's contract included the option of an extra 12 months.

=== AFC Wimbledon ===
On 14 January 2025, Browne signed for League Two side Wimbledon on a deal until the end of the 2024/25 season. The signing was financed by John Green through EA Sports FC streaming funds.

On 27 June 2025, the club announced he had signed a new two-year deal.

== Style of play ==
Oxford United manager Karl Robinson praised the player upon his arrival at the club, stating, "He is technically very good, he sees a pass and will score goals so he is very talented and we know there were a lot of clubs chasing him."

Upon his arrival at the Teesside-based club, Middlesbrough manager Jonathan Woodgate stated, "Marcus is an exciting, hungry young player who wants to come and play for this football club. He's just what we need. He can play in three different positions and he is quick. I watched a lot of games for Oxford last season and he's not only the type of player we want here, but he's also the type we can improve, and he will get better."

== Career statistics ==
As of end of 2025–26 season

Appearances and goals by club, season and competition
Club	Season	League			FA Cup		EFL Cup		Other		Total	
Club	Season	Division	Apps	Goals	Apps	Goals	Apps	Goals	Apps	Goals	Apps	Goals
West Ham United	2016–17	Premier League	0	0	0	0	0	0	1 (Note: Appearance in UEFA Europa League)	0	1	0
West Ham United	2017–18	Premier League	0	0	0	0	0	0	–		0	0
West Ham United	2018–19	Premier League	0	0	0	0	0	0	—		0	0
West Ham United	Total		0	0	0	0	0	0	1	0	1	0
Wigan Athletic (loan)	2016–17	Championship	0	0	1	0	0	0	–		1	0
Oxford United (loan)	2018–19	League One	34	6	4	1	1	1	5 (Note: Appearances in EFL Trophy)	1	44	9
Middlesbrough	2019–20	Championship	13	0	0	0	1	0	–		14	0
Middlesbrough	2020–21	Championship	5	2	1	0	2	0	–		8	2
Middlesbrough	2021–22	Championship	0	0	0	0	0	0	–		0	0
Middlesbrough	Total		18	2	1	0	3	0	–		22	2
Oxford United (loan)	2019–20	League One	11	4	2	0	0	0	3 (Note: Appearances in League One play-offs)	1	16	5
Oxford United	2021–22	League One	5	1	0	0	0	0	–		5	1
Oxford United	2022–23	League One	34	4	2	0	1	0	2	0	39	4
Oxford United	2023–24	League One	12	0	1	0	0	0	2	0	15	0
Oxford United	Total		51	5	3	0	1	0	4	0	59	5
AFC Wimbledon	2024–25	League Two	18	4	0	0	0	0	3 (Note: Appearances in League Two play-offs)	0	21	4
AFC Wimbledon	2025–26	League One	36	12	1	0	0	0	3	2	40	14
AFC Wimbledon	Total		54	16	1	0	0	0	6	2	61	18
Career total			168	33	12	1	5	1	19	4	204	39

== Honours ==
Oxford United

- EFL League One play-offs: 2024

AFC Wimbledon

- EFL League Two play-offs: 2025
