= Nathan Bishop =

English footballer (born 1999)

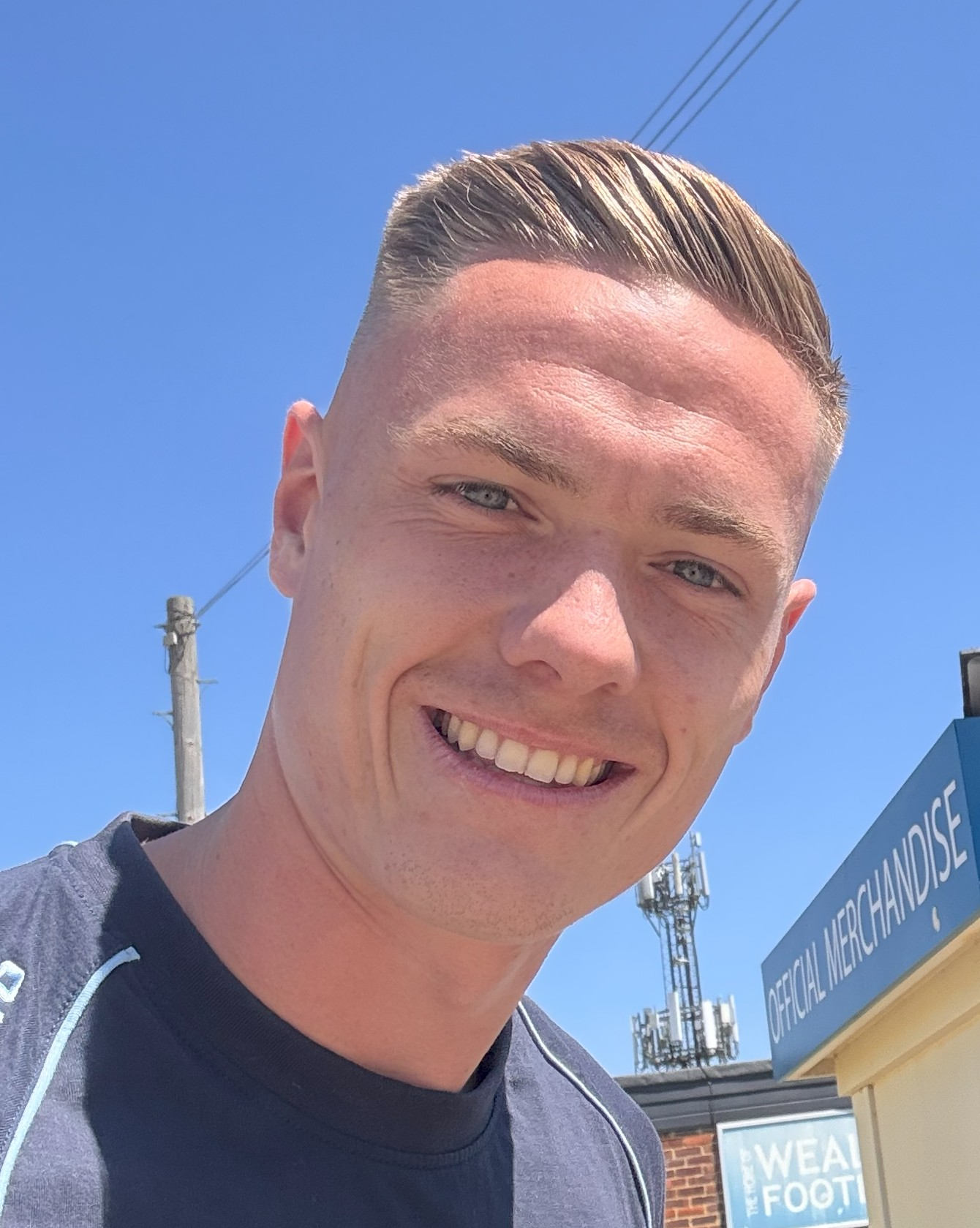
- Nathan Bishop in 2025

Personal information
- Full name: Nathan James Bishop
- Date of birth: 15 October 1999 (age 27)
- Place of birth: Hillingdon, England
- Height: 6 ft 1 in (1.85 m)
- Position: Goalkeeper

Team information
- Current team: AFC Wimbledon
- Number: 1

Youth career
- –2017: Southend United

Senior career*
Years	Team	Apps	(Gls)
2017–2020	Southend United	31	(0)
2020–2023	Manchester United	0	(0)
2021–2022	→ Mansfield Town (loan)	46	(0)
2023–2025	Sunderland	1	(0)
2024–2025	→ Wycombe Wanderers (loan)	2	(0)
2025	→ Cambridge United (loan)	14	(0)
2025–	AFC Wimbledon	39	(0)

International career^{‡}
2019	England U20	1	(0)
- * Club domestic league appearances and goals as of 1 November 2026 (UTC) ‡ National team caps and goals as of 18:05, 26 August 2023 (UTC)

Nathan James Bishop (born 15 October 1999) is an English professional footballer who plays as a goalkeeper for EFL League One club AFC Wimbledon. He has previously played in the English Football League for Southend United and Mansfield Town.

== Club career ==
=== Southend United ===
Bishop was born in Hillingdon, Greater London. He joined Southend United at a young age and first appeared in the first-team squad towards the end of the 2016–17 campaign, appearing as an unused substitute. Following this, Bishop spent time on trial at West Ham United, but was unable to secure a contract and instead returned to Southend for the 2017–18 campaign.

On 23 December 2017, Bishop went on to make his professional debut during Southend's 3–1 away defeat against Scunthorpe United, replacing the injured Mark Oxley at half-time.

=== Manchester United ===
Bishop signed for Premier League club Manchester United on 31 January 2020 for an undisclosed fee on a two-and-a-half-year contract.

==== Mansfield Town (loan) ====
On 24 June 2021, it was announced that Bishop would join Mansfield Town on loan for the 2021–22 season. Bishop played in 53 of Mansfield's competitive games in his season there, including in the EFL League Two Play-off Final, which ultimately ended in a 3–0 defeat to Port Vale.

=== Sunderland ===
Bishop signed for Championship club Sunderland on 2 August 2023 for an undisclosed fee on a three-year contract.

==== Wycombe Wanderers (loan) ====
On 25 June 2024, Wycombe Wanderers announced the signing of Bishop on a one-year loan.

==== Cambridge United (loan) ====
On 3 February 2025, Bishop was recalled from his loan with Wycombe Wanderers to allow him to join fellow League One side Cambridge United on loan for the remainder of the season.

=== AFC Wimbledon ===
On 1 July 2025, Bishop joined newly promoted League One side AFC Wimbledon on a three-year deal.

== International career ==
Bishop was called up to the England under-20 squad midway through the 2019 Toulon Tournament as a replacement for Ryan Schofield and made his debut in the 4–0 win over Guatemala on 11 June 2019.

== Career statistics ==
As of end of 2025–26 season

Appearances and goals by club, season and competition
Club	Season	League			FA Cup		EFL Cup		Other		Total	
Club	Season	Division	Apps	Goals	Apps	Goals	Apps	Goals	Apps	Goals	Apps	Goals
Southend United	2017–18	League One	1	0	0	0	0	0	0	0	1	0
Southend United	2018–19	League One	18	0	0	0	0	0	3 (Note: Appearance(s) in the EFL Trophy)	0	21	0
Southend United	2019–20	League One	12	0	1	0	2	0	2	0	17	0
Southend United	Total		31	0	1	0	2	0	5	0	39	0
Manchester United	2019–20	Premier League	0	0	0	0	—		—		0	0
Manchester United	2020–21	Premier League	0	0	0	0	0	0	—		0	0
Manchester United	2021–22	Premier League	0	0	0	0	0	0	—		0	0
Manchester United	2022–23	Premier League	0	0	0	0	0	0	—		0	0
Manchester United	Total		0	0	0	0	0	0	—		0	0
Manchester United U21	2020–21	—	—		—		—		1	0	1	0
Manchester United U21	2021–22	–	–		—		—		0	0	0	0
Manchester United U21	2022–23	—	—		—		—		4	0	4	0
Manchester United U21	Total		—		—		—		5	0	5	0
Mansfield Town (loan)	2021–22	League Two	46	0	3	0	1	0	3 (Note: Appearances in the EFL League Two play-offs)	0	53	0
Sunderland	2023–24	Championship	1	0	0	0	1	0	—		2	0
Sunderland	2024–25	Championship	0	0	0	0	0	0	–		0	0
Sunderland	Total		1	0	0	0	1	0	–		2	0
Wycombe Wanderers (loan)	2024–25	League One	2	0	1	0	1	0	1	0	5	0
Cambridge United (loan)	2024–25	League One	14	0	–		–		–		14	0
AFC Wimbledon	2025–26	League One	38	0	1	0	0	0	0	0	39	0
Career total			132	0	6	0	5	0	14	0	157	0

== Honours ==
Manchester United

- UEFA Europa League runner-up: 2020–21
