= Aron Sasu =

Norwegian-English footballer (born 2005)

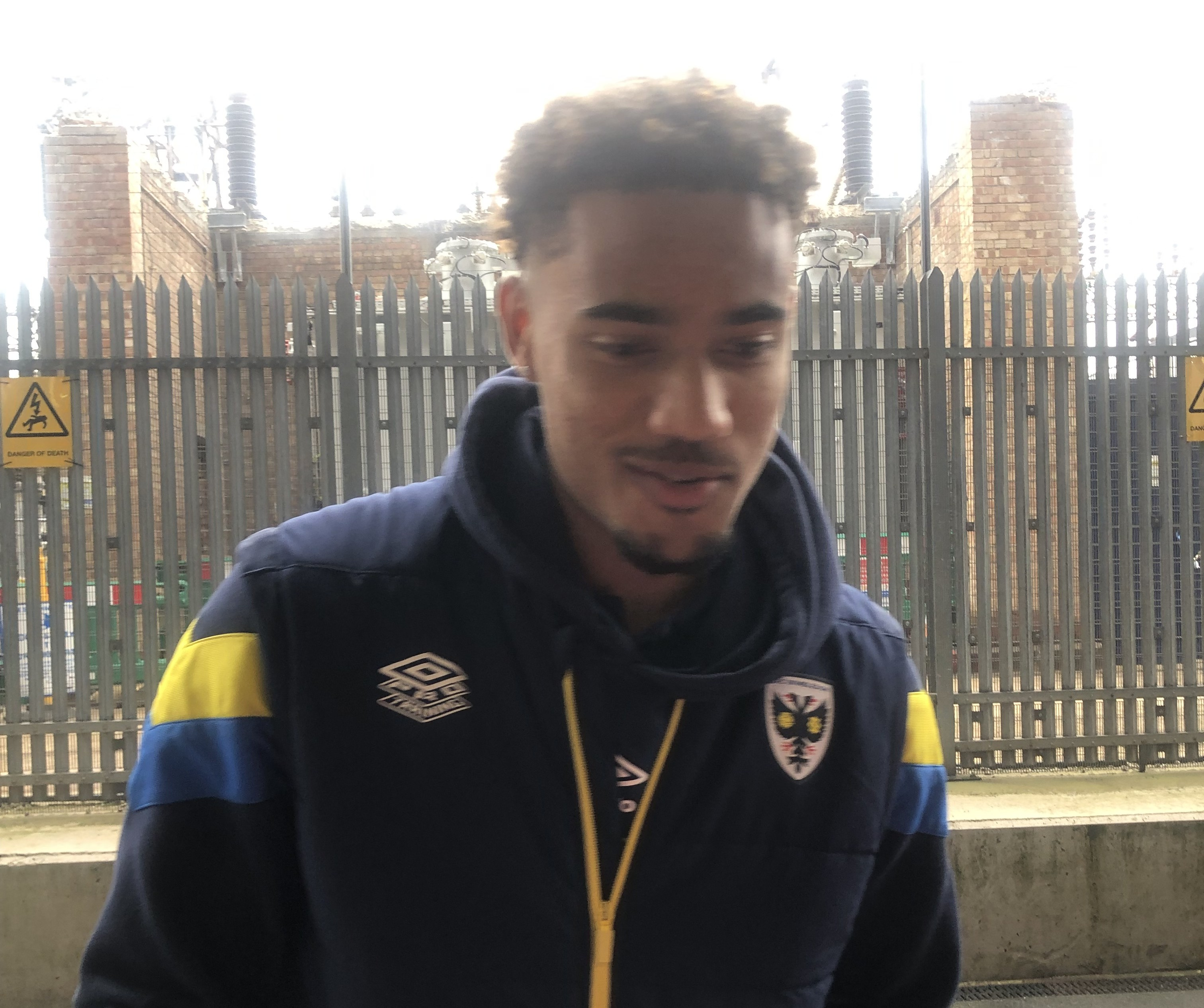
- Sasu in 2025

Personal information
- Full name: Aron Kwame Jolle Sasu
- Date of birth: 5 March 2005 (age 21)
- Place of birth: Croydon, England
- Height: 1.95 m (6 ft 5 in)
- Positions: Wing-back; winger; forward

Team information
- Current team: AFC Wimbledon
- Number: 29

Youth career
- 2016–2023: AFC Wimbledon

Senior career*
Years	Team	Apps	(Gls)
2023–	AFC Wimbledon	60	(0)

International career
2020	Norway U16		
- * Club domestic league appearances and goals as of 12:00, 7 May 2025

Aron Kwame Jolle Sasu (born 5 March 2005) is a professional footballer who plays as a forward for EFL League One club AFC Wimbledon. Born in England, he has been called up to represent Norway at youth level.

== Career ==
Sasu was called up to attend the training camps for the Norway under-16s team in January 2020. He made his debut for AFC Wimbledon on 26 October 2021, in a 2–0 defeat to Crystal Palace in the EFL Trophy.

Sasu scored the first professional goal of his career in a 5–2 victory for AFC Wimbledon against Portsmouth at Fratton Park on 19 December 2023, a result that sent The Dons into the last 16 of the EFL Trophy. After the game, AFC Wimbledon manager Johnnie Jackson described Sasu as "a menace the way he got at them", going on to state that "Sasu was brilliant during pre-season and he forced our hand to keep him around the group."

== Career statistics ==
As of match played 7 May 2025

Appearances and goals by club, season and competition
Club	Season	League			FA Cup		EFL Cup		Other		Total	
Club	Season	Division	Apps	Goals	Apps	Goals	Apps	Goals	Apps	Goals	Apps	Goals
AFC Wimbledon	2021–22	League One	0	0	0	0	0	0	1 (Note: Appearance(s) in EFL Trophy)	0	1	0
AFC Wimbledon	2022–23	League Two	0	0	0	0	0	0	2	0	2	0
AFC Wimbledon	2023–24	League Two	19	0	3	0	2	0	6	1	30	1
AFC Wimbledon	2024–25	League Two	22	0	0	0	0	0	3	0	25	0
AFC Wimbledon	2025–26	League One	19	0	1	0	2	0	3	4	25	4
AFC Wimbledon	Total		60	0	4	0	4	0	15	5	83	5
Career total			60	0	4	0	4	0	15	5	83	5

== Honours ==
AFC Wimbledon

- EFL League Two play-offs: 2025
