= Kai Jennings =

English association football player

Personal information
- Full name: Kai Edward Jennings
- Date of birth: 18 February 2006 (age 20)
- Place of birth: Kingston upon Thames, England
- Position: Midfielder

Team information
- Current team: Crawley Town (on loan from AFC Wimbledon)

Youth career
- 2012–2023: AFC Wimbledon

Senior career*
| Years | Team | Apps | (Gls) |
| 2023– | AFC Wimbledon | 4 | (0) |
| 2024-2025 | → Whitehawk (loan) | 37 | (6) |
| 2025 | → Walton & Hersham (loan) | 11 | (2) |
| 2025 | → Farnborough (loan) | 6 | (0) |
| 2025–2026 | → Sutton United (loan) | 25 | (8) |
| 2026– | → Crawley Town (loan) | 0 | (0) |
- * Club domestic league appearances and goals as of 12:00, 7 May 2026 (UTC)

Kai Edward Jennings (born 18 February 2006) is an English professional footballer who plays as a midfielder for EFL League Two club Crawley Town, on loan from EFL League One club AFC Wimbledon.

== Club career ==
=== AFC Wimbledon ===
Jennings started his career with AFC Wimbledon at the age of six and went on to make his senior debut during an FA Cup first round 5–1 home victory over Cheltenham Town in November 2023. He went on to feature twice more in the EFL Trophy, before finishing the campaign at Whitehawk on loan.

==== Loan to Whitehawk ====
He then returned to the Sussex-based side ahead of the 2024–25 campaign on another loan deal. In February 2025, Jennings then joined Walton & Hersham on loan for the remainder of the campaign.

==== Loan to Farnborough ====
On 4 August 2025, Jennings joined National League South side, Farnborough on loan until January 2026. He went onto feature nine times in all competitions before returning to Wimbledon early, in October.

==== Loan to Sutton United ====
On 24 October 2025, Jennings made the switch to National League side, Sutton United on loan until January 2026. In March 2026, he was recalled from his loan, making his league debut three days later.

==== Loan to Crawley Town ====
On 17 August 2026, Jennings joined EFL League Two side Crawley Town on a season-long loan.

== Career statistics ==
As of match played 7 May 2026

Appearances and goals by club, season and competition
| Club | Season | League | | | FA Cup | | EFL Cup | | Other | | Total | |
| Club | Season | Division | Apps | Goals | Apps | Goals | Apps | Goals | Apps | Goals | Apps | Goals |
|---|---|---|---|---|---|---|---|---|---|---|---|---|
| AFC Wimbledon | 2023–24 | League Two | 0 | 0 | 1 | 0 | 0 | 0 | 2 (Note: Appearances in the EFL Trophy) | 0 | 3 | 0 |
| AFC Wimbledon | 2024–25 | League Two | 0 | 0 | — | | 0 | 0 | 0 | 0 | 0 | 0 |
| AFC Wimbledon | 2025–26 | League One | 4 | 0 | — | | 0 | 0 | 3 | 1 | 7 | 1 |
| AFC Wimbledon | Total | | 4 | 0 | 1 | 0 | 0 | 0 | 5 | 1 | 10 | 1 |
| Whitehawk (loan) | 2023–24 | Isthmian League Premier Division | 11 | 3 | — | | — | | — | | 11 | 3 |
| Whitehawk (loan) | 2024–25 | Isthmian League Premier Division | 26 | 3 | 1 | 0 | — | | 1 (Note: Appearance in the FA Trophy) | 0 | 28 | 3 |
| Whitehawk (loan) | Total | | 37 | 6 | 1 | 0 | — | | 1 | 0 | 39 | 6 |
| Walton & Hersham (loan) | 2024–25 | Southern League Premier Division South | 11 | 2 | — | | — | | 1 (Note: Appearance in the Southern League Premier Division South play-offs) | 0 | 12 | 2 |
| Farnborough (loan) | 2025–26 | National League South | 6 | 0 | 3 | 0 | — | | 0 | 0 | 9 | 0 |
| Sutton United (loan) | 2025–26 | National League | 25 | 8 | 2 | 1 | — | | 1 | 1 | 28 | 10 |
| Career total | | | 83 | 16 | 7 | 1 | 0 | 0 | 8 | 2 | 95 | 19 |
