= MIMS Ireland =

Irish medical journal

- MIMS Ireland 50th Anniversary Front Cover.
- Categories: Trade newspaper
- Frequency: Monthly
- Publisher: MPI Media Ltd
- Country: Ireland
- Language: Hiberno English

The Monthly Index of Medical Specialities Ireland (MIMS Ireland) is a prescribing guide delivered to medical practitioners in Ireland. It was established in 1960 as a small, concise medical guide. MIMS Ireland is used by the Irish Medicines Board to convey information on drug safety, and is a "recommended text" in the premises requirements for pharmacies issued by the Pharmaceutical Society of Ireland (PSI). It is also listed as a reference for the use of drugs in sports by the Irish Sports Council.

Reed Business Information sold MIMS Ireland to Metropolis International in 2009. MIMS Ireland celebrated its 50th anniversary in 2010.

== Origin ==
Dr John O'Connell, an Irish general practitioner who later became the Minister for Health, proposed the concept of a compact, user-friendly medical guide for use by doctors when prescribing drugs to English publisher Alf Morgan. This guide was called the Monthly Index of Medical Specialities (MIMS). As drug names in Ireland were somewhat different from those in the UK, Morgan and O'Connell both set up their own versions of MIMS in their respective home countries. The MIMS concept was subsequently taken up by a number of other English speaking countries around the world who set up their own versions of MIMS.

== Editorial content ==
The core of MIMS Ireland consists of entries (monographs) of medicinal products available in the Republic of Ireland. These include a summary of main prescribing information such as indications, dosage, contraindications, interactions, special-warnings and side effects as well as information about pack size and price. MIMS Ireland also works in collaboration with the Irish Sports Council to provide guidance on the use of each drug in sport.

In addition, MIMS Ireland contains a preliminary section which each month includes:

- Extended monographs of new products that have become available in that month
- New Clinical Evidence (reviews of recently published/presented results of clinical trials)
- A Clinical Special (monthly focus on a particular condition)
- A monthly update on safety issues provided to MIMS Ireland by the Irish Authority for Pharmacovigilance reporting (the Irish Medicines Board, or IMB)
- A summary of the World Anti-Doping Agency (WADA) Code provided to MIMS Ireland by the Irish Sports Council

Though MIMS Ireland is supported by advertisement and educational grants from the pharmaceutical industry, it is an independently written and edited.

Several supplements, focusing on specific areas, have been published alongside MIMS Ireland. These have included an oncology reference, diabetes Reference and cardiovascular reference supplement.

== See also ==
- Irish Medical Times, also founded by John O'Connell
