= Relocation of Wimbledon F.C. to Milton Keynes =

Relocation of sport club

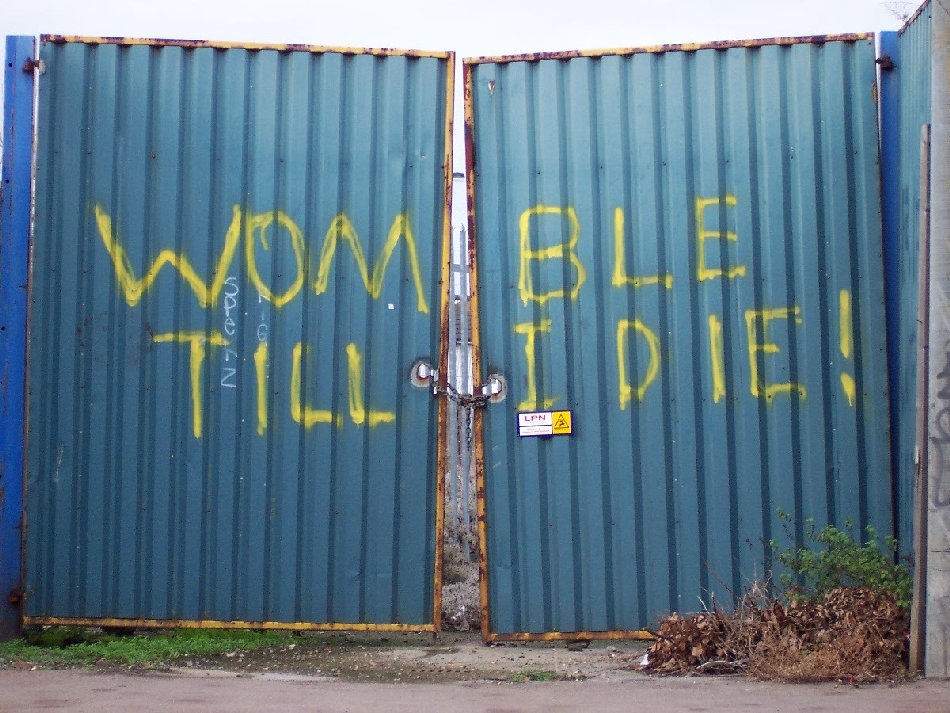
Graffiti on the locked gates of Wimbledon F.C.'s home ground, the original Plough Lane, in 2006. The club, nicknamed "the Wombles" or "the Dons", last played first-team matches there in 1991, and the stadium was demolished in late 2002. Blocks of flats have covered the site since 2008.

Wimbledon Football Club relocated to Milton Keynes in September 2003, 16 months after receiving permission to do so from the Football Association on the basis of a two-to-one decision in favour by an FA-appointed independent commission. The move took the team from South West London, where it had been based since its foundation in 1889, to Milton Keynes, a new town in Buckinghamshire, about 56 miles (90 km) to the northwest of the club's traditional home district Wimbledon. Hugely controversial, the move's authorisation led a group of Wimbledon supporters to form AFC Wimbledon, a new club, on 30 May 2002. The relocated team played home matches in Milton Keynes under the Wimbledon name from September 2003 until June 2004, when following the end of the 2003–04 season it renamed itself Milton Keynes Dons F.C. (MK Dons).

Wimbledon F.C. spent most of its history in non-League football before being elected to the Football League in 1977. A series of club owners believed that its long-term potential was limited by its home ground at Plough Lane, which never changed significantly from the team's non-League days. Meanwhile, the Milton Keynes Development Corporation envisaged a stadium in the town hosting top-flight football and was keen on the idea of an established League team relocating there. The Wimbledon chairman Ron Noades briefly explored moving Wimbledon to Milton Keynes in 1979, but decided it would not lead to larger crowds. Charlton Athletic briefly mooted a relocation in 1973, and in the 1980s the Milton Keynes Development Corporation offered a new ground to Luton Town.

Wimbledon rose through the professional divisions unusually rapidly in what has been called a "fairytale". By 1986, they had reached the First Division, the top-flight of English football. In 1991, after the Taylor Report ordered the redevelopment of English football grounds, the team entered a groundshare at Crystal Palace's Selhurst Park stadium, about 6 miles (9.7 km) east of Plough Lane. This was supposed to be a temporary arrangement while the Wimbledon chairman Sam Hammam sought a new stadium site in south-west London, but the search took longer than anticipated. Hammam proposed new locations for the team outside London, including Dublin, a decision that drew criticism from many Wimbledon supporters. He sold the club to two Norwegian businessmen, Kjell Inge Røkke and Bjørn Rune Gjelsten, in 1997 and the following year sold Plough Lane for a supermarket redevelopment.

Starting in 1997 a consortium led by Pete Winkelman proposed a large retail development in Milton Keynes including a Football League–standard stadium, and offered this site to Luton, Wimbledon, Barnet, Crystal Palace and Queens Park Rangers. Røkke and Gjelsten appointed a new chairman, Charles Koppel, who announced on 2 August 2001 that Wimbledon intended to relocate to Milton Keynes. Koppel said the club would otherwise go out of business. After the League refused permission, Koppel launched an appeal, leading to an FA arbitration hearing and subsequently the appointment of a three-man independent commission by the FA in May 2002 to make a final and binding verdict. The League and FA stated opposition but the commissioners ruled in favour, two to one. The vast majority of the team's fans switched allegiance to AFC Wimbledon in protest. Wimbledon F.C.'s relocation was delayed for over a year by the lack of an interim ground in Milton Keynes meeting Football League standards. In June 2003 the club went into administration; Winkelman's consortium injected funds to keep it operating and paid for the renovation of the National Hockey Stadium in Milton Keynes, where the team played its first match in September 2003. Winkelman's Inter MK Group bought the relocated club in 2004 and concurrently changed its name, badge and colours. The team's new ground, Stadium MK, opened three years later. MK Dons initially claimed Wimbledon F.C.'s heritage and history, but officially renounced this in 2007. AFC Wimbledon received planning permission for a new ground on Plough Lane in 2015, which they eventually moved into ahead of the 2020–21 season.

== Background ==
=== Milton Keynes ===
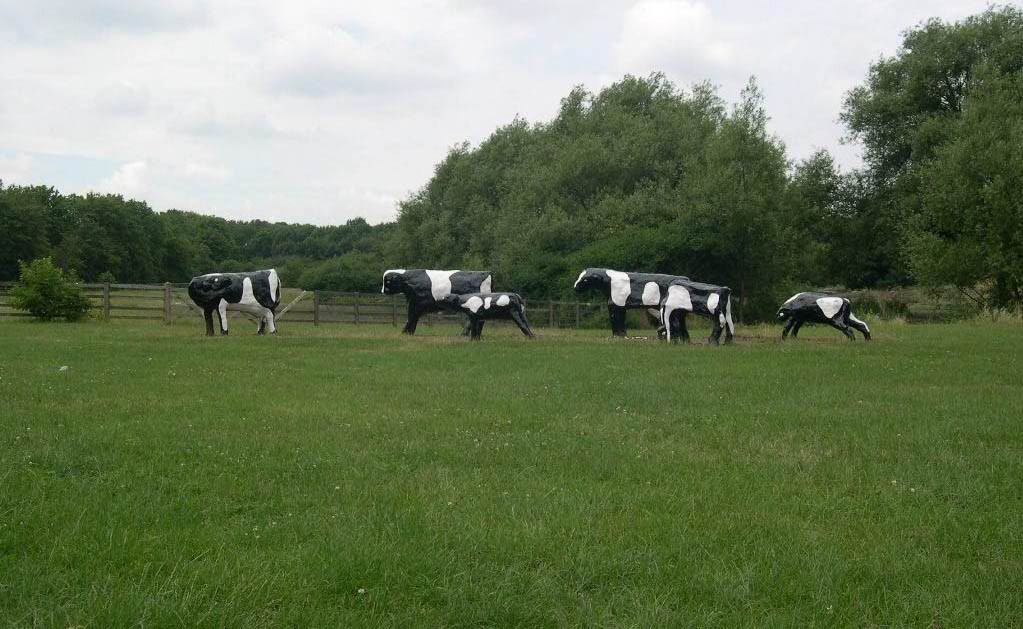
Liz Leyh's Concrete Cows, a symbol of Milton Keynes created in 1978 (2006 photograph)

Milton Keynes, in northern Buckinghamshire, was established by the Ministry of Housing and Local Government as a new town on 23 January 1967. Named after the village of Milton Keynes already present on the site, it was formed primarily as a London overspill settlement following the recommendations of governmental studies in 1964 and 1965 to build "a new city" in Buckinghamshire incorporating existing towns such as Bletchley, Stony Stratford and Wolverton. This site was chosen as it was equidistant from London and Birmingham, close to main roads and railways, and near Luton Airport. About 40,000 people lived on the Milton Keynes site before 1967; the government set a target population of 250,000.

When Milton Keynes was founded, no football club within its boundaries was professional and none played in the Football League. The teams most advanced in the English football league system or "pyramid" were the United Counties League sides Bletchley Town and Wolverton Town & B.R., (Note: The name "Milton Keynes City" (MK City) refers to two different non-League clubs. The first was formerly known as Bletchley Town F.C., and was called MK City from 1974 until its liquidation in 1985. The second was previously called Mercedes-Benz F.C., and played as MK City from 1998 until its own demise in 2003.) (Note: Wolverton Town & B.R. went through a variety of names after the founding of Milton Keynes in 1967. It dropped the "B.R." suffix from its name in 1981, then added "(Milton Keynes)" in 1987, becoming Wolverton Town (Milton Keynes). A year later the naming order was reversed, with the club now calling itself Milton Keynes Wolverton Town. Finally, in 1990, the name Wolverton A.F.C. was adopted. This remained until the club's closure in 1992.) and Stony Stratford Town of the South Midlands League; New Bradwell St Peter and Newport Pagnell Wanderers (Newport Pagnell Town from 1972) would join the South Midlands League in 1970 and 1972 respectively. Nevertheless, the Milton Keynes Development Corporation, created by the government to oversee the town's planning and construction, envisaged a stadium in Milton Keynes capable of accommodating a top-flight football team.

=== Accession to the Football League; club relocation in English football ===
Geographical distribution of the 92 clubs in the Football League during the 1967–68 season, and Milton Keynes (marked in grey). Many teams are concentrated in urban areas such as London (London clubs marked in blue).

In English football, the relocation of teams away from their traditional districts is unusual because of the nature of the relationship between clubs and their fans: the local football club is regarded by most English football supporters as part of the local identity and social fabric rather than as a business that can be transplanted by its owners at will. As a result, any relocation plan would be strongly opposed by fans in the club's original area, and unlikely to succeed in most new locations due to the existence of established teams in most towns and cities that would already have secured the loyalty of local football fans. John Bale, summarising a study published in 1974, writes that, in the view of most fans, "Chelsea would simply not be Chelsea" were that club to move a few miles within the same borough to Wormwood Scrubs.

The geographic redistribution of the 92 Football League teams was considered a possible eventuality by some around that time, including Sir Norman Chester, who headed an investigation into the condition of English football in 1968. Before the 1986–87 season, clubs could not be relegated out of the League's Fourth Division. The bottom four clubs had to apply for re-election by the other member clubs at the end of each season, alongside any non-League teams who wished to take their place, but the replacement of an established League side in this way was quite rare. From the inaugural post-war season (1946–47) through to 1985–86, clubs already in the League were supplanted on only six occasions. (Note: When Workington usurped them in 1951, New Brighton A.F.C. became the second New Brighton side (after New Brighton Tower) and the last Third Division North club to lose their League status, fifty years after the Towerites' exit. The Fourth Division was founded in 1958, and Peterborough United were elected to it in 1960 in Gateshead's stead. A decade later Bradford Park Avenue fell victim to Cambridge United, and in 1972 Barrow lost out to Hereford United. Wimbledon replaced Workington in 1977, a year before Wigan Athletic saw off near-neighbours Southport in the final re-election failure.) "New communities have developed ... which lack clubs in League membership," Chester reported, in 1968. "Amalgamations of old clubs would provide vacancies for new clubs to enter the League". Merging football clubs in England has been described as "anathema" to the fans. Moore concluded "Merged clubs lose fans as well as gain them. If formed way back, “Bristol United" would probably have fared better than either [Bristolian clubs] City or Rovers have done independently, but there is too much history and animosity to merge now.". "Alternatively", Chester also added, "the movement of established clubs to new communities could provide a way both of saving old clubs and at the same time bringing League football to new and growing areas." Closely fitting this description, Milton Keynes was identified as a potential site for such a relocation.

At the end of the 1978–79 season, 20 leading non-League clubs left the Southern League and the Northern Premier League to form the Alliance Premier League. (Note: The twenty-strong founder membership of the 1979–80 Alliance Premier League comprised seven clubs from the 1978–79 Northern Premier League (Altrincham, Bangor City, Barrow, Boston United, Northwich Victoria, Scarborough, and Stafford Rangers) and thirteen from the 1978–79 Southern Football League's Premier Division (AP Leamington, Barnet, Bath City, Gravesend & Northfleet, Kettering Town, Nuneaton Borough, Redditch United, Telford United, Wealdstone, Weymouth, and winners Worcester City). Selection was not based on league position: Northern Premier League champions Mossley remained to defend their title, effectively dropping down a level, while Barrow and Wealdstone joined the Alliance, despite having finished 16th in the Northern and 15th in the Southern respectively.) This national non-League division started in the 1979–80 season; it was called the Football Conference from 1986 to 2015, when it became the National League. Since the 1986–87 season, the champions of this league have received promotion to the Football League, with the League's bottom club being relegated in exchange. This was expanded to the Conference champions and the winners of a promotion play-off before the 2002–03 season, with the worst two Football League clubs being relegated. The situation of the Football League "closed shop", which for nearly a century effectively barred most non-League clubs from accession, therefore no longer exists. Any club in the English football pyramid (which also includes some clubs from Wales (Note: Welsh clubs Cardiff City, Merthyr Town, Newport County, Swansea City and Wrexham play in the English pyramid as of the 2019–20 season. Aberdare Athletic, Abertillery Town, Bangor City, Barry Town, Bridgend Town, Caernarfon Town, Colwyn Bay, Lovell's Athletic, Mardy, Merthyr Tydfil, Newtown, Rhyl, Ton Pentre and Treharris also formerly did so.)) can potentially win enough promotions to reach the Football League or the Premier League, the separate top division formed in 1992. (Note: As organised at the end of the 2011–12 season, the pyramid comprises more than 480 interconnected divisions, spread across 24 tiers. The top five levels each comprise one division of between 20 and 24 teams from across the country, while those below include multiple regional divisions of varying sizes. All of these divisions exchange clubs at the end of each season through promotion and relegation.)

==== Precursors in Scottish and English football ====
According to the Football League's statement to the independent commission on Wimbledon F.C. in May 2002, the English League "had allowed temporary relocations for good reasons outside 'conurbations' in respect of certain clubs where it was intended the club would return, but there has been no previous occasion on which the Football League had granted permission to a club to relocate permanently to a ground outside its 'conurbation'." Clubs in the English professional ranks that have relocated to other locales within their traditional conurbations include Manchester United and Woolwich Arsenal, who moved 5 miles (8 km) and 10 miles (16 km) respectively in 1910 and 1913. (Note: Manchester United moved from Clayton, 3 miles (4.8 km) east of central Manchester, to Old Trafford, 2 miles (3.2 km) south-west, in 1910. Woolwich Arsenal migrated from Woolwich in south-east London to Highbury in the north of the city in 1913, and dropped "Woolwich" from their name the following year.) South Shields of the Third Division North relocated 8 miles (13 km) west to Gateshead in 1930 and renamed themselves Gateshead A.F.C. The commission reported that there was no Football League precedent for a move between conurbations, but stressed that there was direct precedent for such a move in Scotland.

Promotion and relegation in and out of the Scottish Professional Football League was not introduced until the league system's reorganisation in 2014; until then it was nearly impossible for sides outside the League to join. Scottish League membership therefore remained largely restricted to well-established cities as opposed to new towns. Two Scottish League teams left their metropolitan districts for new towns during the 1990s. Third-flight club Clyde moved from Shawfield Stadium (close to Rutherglen in the south-east of Glasgow) to the new town of Cumbernauld, about 16 miles (26 km) to the north-east, in 1994, and a year later Meadowbank Thistle, a struggling Edinburgh club in the fourth tier, relocated amid fans' protests about 20 miles (32 km) west to another new town, Livingston. Clyde kept their original name, while Meadowbank renamed themselves Livingston Football Club.

In English non-League football, events surrounding Enfield F.C. have been latterly described as mirroring what was to occur at Wimbledon. Enfield's owner Tony Lazarou sold the club's ground at Southbury Road in 1999 and arranged several short-term groundshares before resettling Enfield 10 miles (16 km) west in Borehamwood—temporarily, he said, while he looked for a new stadium in Enfield. Two years later, after no site had been identified and a dispute had developed regarding an escrow account, the Enfield Supporters' Trust resolved in June 2001 that Lazarou lacked sufficient will to bring the club back to Enfield and so founded a new team, Enfield Town, which based itself locally and won the support of much of the original Enfield fanbase. In 2012, a supporters' trust established 1874 Northwich after a dispute with Northwich Victoria's management. In each of these cases, Stephen Mumford comments in his 2013 work Watching Sport: Aesthetics, Ethics and Emotion, "supporters have agonised over where their allegiance properly lies".

== Early Milton Keynes relocation proposals ==
=== Charlton Athletic (1973) ===
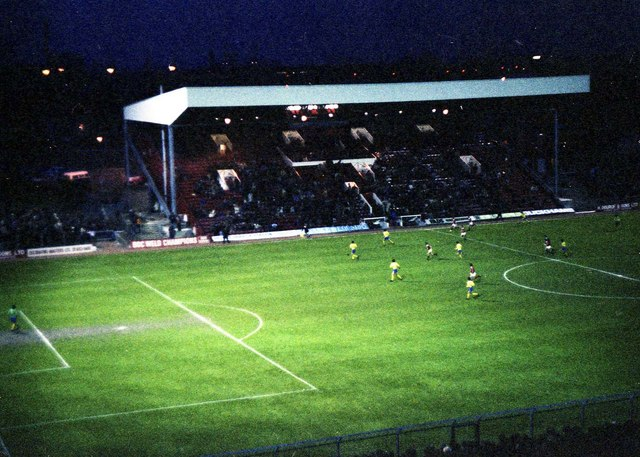
A view of The Valley in 1981. Charlton Athletic threatened to leave for the Midlands in 1973, before groundsharing elsewhere in London from 1985 to 1992.

The south-east London club Charlton Athletic were linked with a move to "a progressive Midlands borough" in 1973, a year after Charlton's relegation to the third tier. The Gliksten family, which owned Charlton from 1932 to 1982 and had a history of proposing elaborate schemes for the club, (Note: On buying the team in 1932, they briefly planned to expand The Valley to house 200,000 fans, which would have been a world record capacity. Jimmy Seed, Charlton's manager from 1933 to 1956, claimed in his autobiography that the Glikstens later considered moving the club to South Africa to avoid taxes.) revealed plans to build a community sports complex at The Valley, and to hold a public market at the ground on weekdays. Greenwich Council refused to license the market and insisted that the complex be built on public space at a local park. The club reacted by announcing the proposed relocation to the Midlands. Fans inundated the local media and club offices with strong opinion against a move, prompting Charlton to print a statement on 14 April 1973 matchday programme telling fans that the proposed relocation was because of the council's attitude regarding the market and complex plans, which the team said threatened its future. "You, the supporters, can make sure the club continues in Charlton by protesting as loud as you can to Greenwich Council over their refusal to grant us permission for our plans," the message explained. No permanent relocation occurred, but the capacity of the Valley was slashed repeatedly in the following years: to 20,000 in 1975 and to 13,000 in 1981.

Charlton were made homeless in September 1985 when they began groundsharing with Crystal Palace at Selhurst Park. Maguire claims that Greenwich Council and some factions of the club wished to see Charlton move 2 1/2 miles away from the Valley to the Blackwall Peninsula, though this was unpopular as that area is "closer to Millwall territory" while also concluding "this would arguably have hampered the club's future growth". After supporters fielded candidates in the 1990 local elections as the Valley Party, getting a 10.9% share (14,838 votes) a return was approved on 2 April 1991. In August 1991 they moved in with West Ham United at the Boleyn Ground, better known by its eponym district Upton Park. Finally, on 5 December 1992, Charlton had their first match back at the Valley, a 1–0 win over Portsmouth.

=== Wimbledon (1979) ===
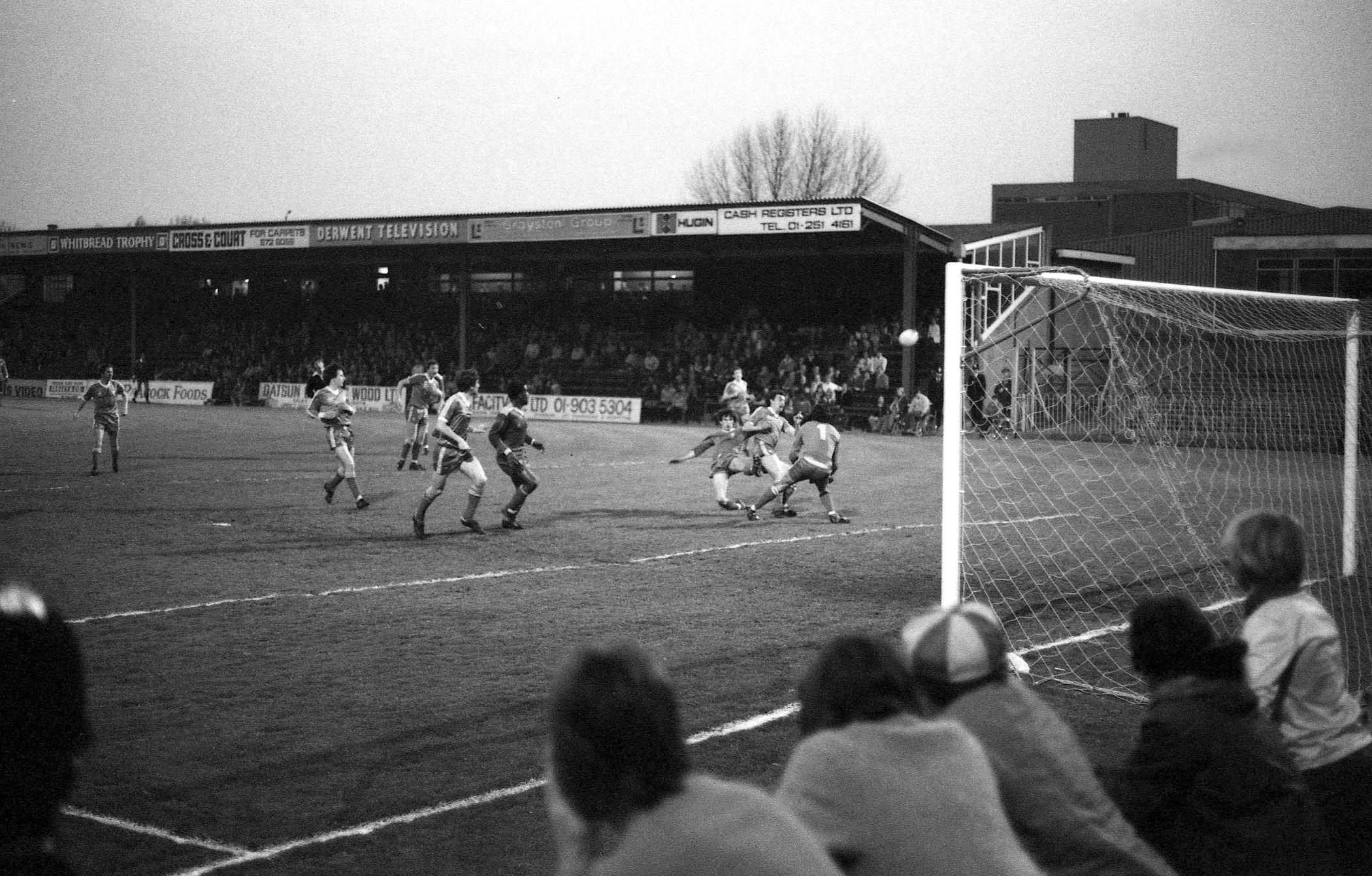
Wimbledon playing against Oxford United at Plough Lane during the 1981–82 season

The south-west London club Wimbledon, traditionally a semi-professional non-League side, won three successive Southern League championships between 1975 and 1977 and were thereupon elected into the Football League. Nicknamed "the Dons", (Note: This nickname is common among sports teams in the Wimbledon locale, including, outside of football, the now-defunct Wimbledon Dons speedway squad and Wimbledon Rugby Football Club. Teams from elsewhere using the name include Aberdeen and Hendon football clubs, Doncaster Rugby League Football Club and others outside the UK.) they proceeded to perform strongly in fully professional football, winning promotion to the then-top flight First Division for the 1986–87 season. The club's swift "fairytale" rise from obscurity through the English football pyramid caused it to reach a level of prominence far above that suggested by its modest home stadium at Plough Lane, which remained largely unchanged from the club's non-League days. Wimbledon's record attendance at Plough Lane—18,000, set "in the 1930s against a team of sailors from HMS Victory"—was never broken during 14 League seasons at the ground, including five in the top flight.

Ron Noades, who purchased the club for £2,782 in 1976, came to see Plough Lane as a potential limitation by 1979. He surmised that it could only attract a relatively small number of fans because of its location, close to large areas of sparsely populated parkland. Noades's interest was piqued by the site the Milton Keynes Development Corporation had earmarked for a stadium next to the town's still-under-construction Central railway station. "They were very keen to get a Football League club, effectively a franchise if you like, into Milton Keynes to take up that site," Noades said in a 2001 interview. Planning to relocate Wimbledon there by amalgamating with an established Milton Keynes club, Noades purchased debt-ridden Southern League club Milton Keynes City (MK City; formerly Bletchley Town) for £1. He and three other Wimbledon directors—Jimmy Rose, Bernie Coleman and Sam Hammam—were promptly voted onto MK City's board "in an advisory capacity". This was a separate personal investment by the four directors, Noades said at the time, and not relevant to a relocation, though he also spoke at length about what he saw as the superior long-term promise of the Milton Keynes location.

Despite his early optimism, Noades soon came to the conclusion that a League club in Milton Keynes would not draw crowds much higher than those Wimbledon already attracted in south London. "I couldn't really see us getting any bigger gates than what Northampton Town were currently getting at that time, and, in fact, are still getting," he recalled in 2001. "I really couldn't see any future in it. I can't actually see that there is a means of drawing large attendances to Milton Keynes." Abandoning his interest in MK City, Noades sold Wimbledon to Hammam in 1981 for £40,000. Later that year Noades bought nearby Crystal Palace and briefly explored merging that club with Wimbledon.

=== Luton Town—"MK Hatters" (1980s) ===
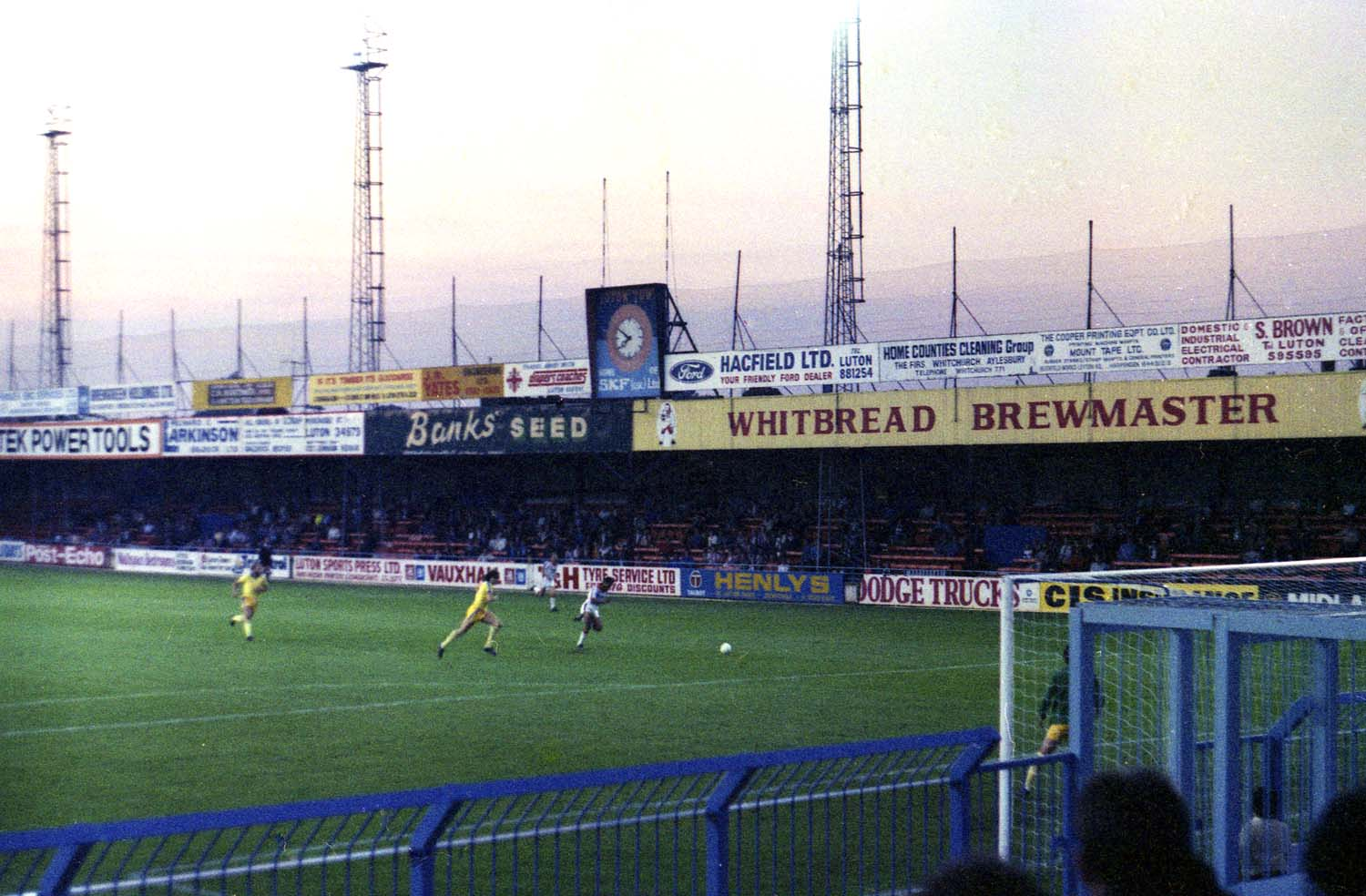
Luton Town considered leaving Kenilworth Road (1980 image) for Milton Keynes in the 1980s, reportedly as the "MK Hatters".

Luton Town, based 20 miles (32 km) from Milton Keynes in Luton and nicknamed "the Hatters", were also seeking a new site at this time. As early as 1960, then-First Division Luton's attendances had been deemed far too low for the top flight by Charles Buchan's Football Monthly, which also considered their ground at Kenilworth Road, in the middle of town, to be hard to get to. At this time the club was already planning a 50,000-capacity ground near Dunstable, to the north-west of Luton, but no new ground materialised. Luton were relegated in 1960 and, apart from the 1974–75 season, remained outside of the top division until 1982–83.

With the team still based at the "cramped and inadequate" Kenilworth Road in 1983, the construction of a new road next to the ground escalated the need for a replacement. The Milton Keynes Development Corporation approached Luton proposing a new all-seater stadium in central Milton Keynes, housing either 18,000 or 20,000 spectators, as part of a leisure and retail development. Luton's owners were receptive to the idea; according to The Luton News, the relocated "MK Hatters" would play home matches in a "super-stadium". This ground would reportedly have an artificial pitch and a roof; Milton Keynes Council would invest heavily in its construction. The Luton chairman Denis Mortimer surmised if the team relocated it would not only garner new fans from the Milton Keynes area but also retain the existing Luton fanbase. He said that the club was financially unsustainable at Kenilworth Road and would go bankrupt if it did not move. The Milton Keynes idea was very poorly received by Luton fans and viewed, in Bale's words, as "tearing the club from its most loyal supporters". Luton fans held protest marches and rallies throughout the 1983–84 season, and chartered a plane to fly over Kenilworth Road during one match pulling a banner reading "Keep Luton Town F.C. in Luton". Some 18,000 Luton residents signed a petition against the club leaving. A consortium of local businessmen attempted to persuade Vauxhall Motors, General Motors' Luton-based British marque, to invest in the club and help with a new stadium in Luton. In Milton Keynes, some residents expressed fears that Luton's arrival in central Milton Keynes might bring with it football hooliganism and threaten local amenities. Some Luton supporters boycotted the club's first home match of the 1984–85 season in protest against the Milton Keynes plans. Opposition from Luton supporters played a significant role in preventing the move. "The directors want our support and our money," said Tom Hunt, a member of a Luton fans' action group against the move, "but they ignore the views of a community that wants to keep its football club. Why should fans pay at the turnstiles to help the club in business so that it can be taken away from us?"

== Wimbledon leave Plough Lane ==
=== Taylor Report ===
Wimbledon moved about 6 miles (9.7 km) across south London, from Plough Lane to Selhurst Park, before the 1991–92 season. This move was supposed to be temporary while the club arranged a new stadium of its own on a more local site.

Wimbledon's success as a club in the top flight of English football was founded on unorthodox financial management and judicious dealings in the transfer market, with many players being sold for fees ranging from six figures to £2 million or more between 1987 and 1992. Rumours of a move or a merger with another London side persisted, leading the club's chief executive Colin Hutchinson to resign in 1987 amid talk of an amalgamation with Ron Noades's new club Crystal Palace or a groundshare at Queens Park Rangers' Loftus Road ground in Shepherd's Bush. (Note: The idea of pooling the resources of two or more of the smaller London clubs was visited in 1967, between western clubs Brentford and QPR, and regularly explored in the late 1980s; another proposal was to fuse QPR with Fulham to make "Fulham Park Rangers".) It later emerged that Charlton Athletic, who had been Palace's tenants from 1985 until 1991, were woven into the bargain too, to potentially create a "South London super club". Wimbledon were granted planning permission to build a 20,000-seater ground in their home borough of Merton in 1988, soon after they won the FA Cup, but the site was instead made into a car park by a newly elected Labour council in 1990. Wimbledon's desire to relocate was made a necessity in January 1990, when the Taylor Report, which ordered the extensive redevelopment of football grounds, was released - Plough Lane was deemed unsuitable for redevelopment as a sustainable top flight all-seater stadium.

When Hammam purchased the club from Noades in 1981, Wimbledon also owned the ground at Plough Lane; a pre-emption clause existed, however, which reserved the site for "sports, leisure or recreational purposes" only. If Wimbledon Football Club were ever wound up, Plough Lane's owners were legally bound to sell the stadium to Merton Council for £8,000, irrespective of inflation. This clause reduced the possibility of the club losing its home stadium, but it was unpopular with a succession of Wimbledon owners as it made the site practically worthless as real estate. Hammam complained that this limited his ability to borrow money needed to redevelop the ground. Seeking to increase Plough Lane's commercial value, Hammam entered into negotiations with the council to remove the clause in 1990; the eventual agreed price for the revoking of the clause was a sum between £300,000 and £800,000. At least one Wimbledon club director resigned his position in protest.

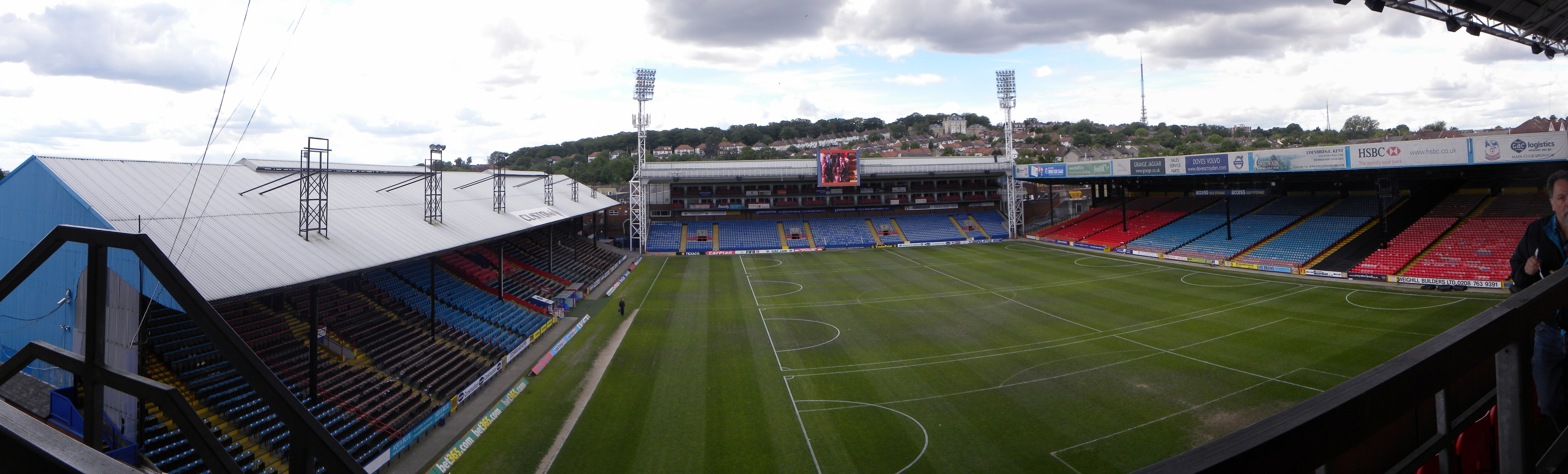
Selhurst Park, photographed in 2011

Even with this clause removed, the team could not afford to redevelop Plough Lane when required to do so the following year. Wimbledon relocated about 6 miles (9.7 km) across south London before the start of the 1991–92 season to share Crystal Palace's Selhurst Park ground. This was supposed to be a temporary arrangement while Wimbledon arranged the construction of their own new ground in a more local area, but the relocation was still unpopular among fans - and the arrangement would ultimately last for over a decade, and would ultimately have a very different outcome to the one which was widely expected in 1991. Critics alleged that it was at least partly motivated by financial considerations, particularly the profit that might be gained from selling the old ground. The respective Wimbledon and Crystal Palace reserve teams groundshared at Plough Lane after the Wimbledon first team relocated.

=== Wimbledon at Selhurst Park; Dublin and Belfast proposals ===
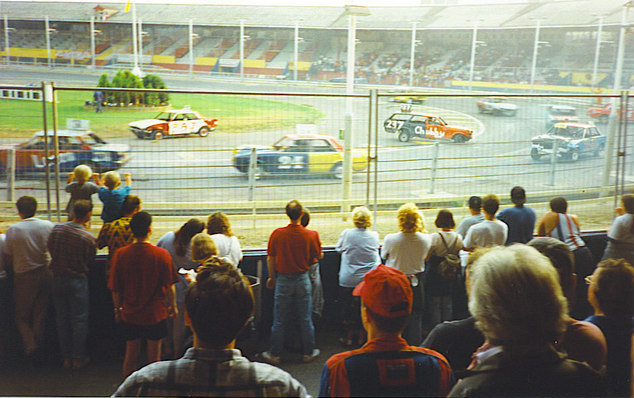
In 1992, the Greyhound Racing Association offered to redevelop Wimbledon Stadium (1995 image) for dogs and football.

Merton Council had been recommending that Wimbledon relocate to a site in nearby Beddington, but this proposal fell through soon after the move to Selhurst Park. With the inflation in costs brought on by the foundation of the FA Premier League in 1992, the club soon began to lose money heavily. Rumours that the groundshare would eventually result in the Dons and the Eagles merging led Hammam to say "I'd rather die and have vultures eat my insides than merge with Crystal Palace". In 1992 the Greyhound Racing Association offered to redevelop Wimbledon Stadium (less than a mile from Plough Lane) into a 15,000-seater dog racing and football ground. Hammam was outraged two years later when the council, attempting to retain the Plough Lane site for public use, refused to sanction its sale for a supermarket redevelopment that Hammam said would finance a new ground at the dog racing site. Hammam angrily declared he would look elsewhere, and threatened to change the club's name and remove the double-headed eagle device, a symbol of Wimbledon Borough, from the team's badge. "We have been betrayed," he told the press. "The council say they want us back, but when it comes to taking action they don't want to know." In 2023 it was revealed in a note dated 1997 that the former British Prime Minister Tony Blair endorsed the idea of Wimbledon FC relocating to the city of Belfast in Northern Ireland and being rebranded as Belfast United.

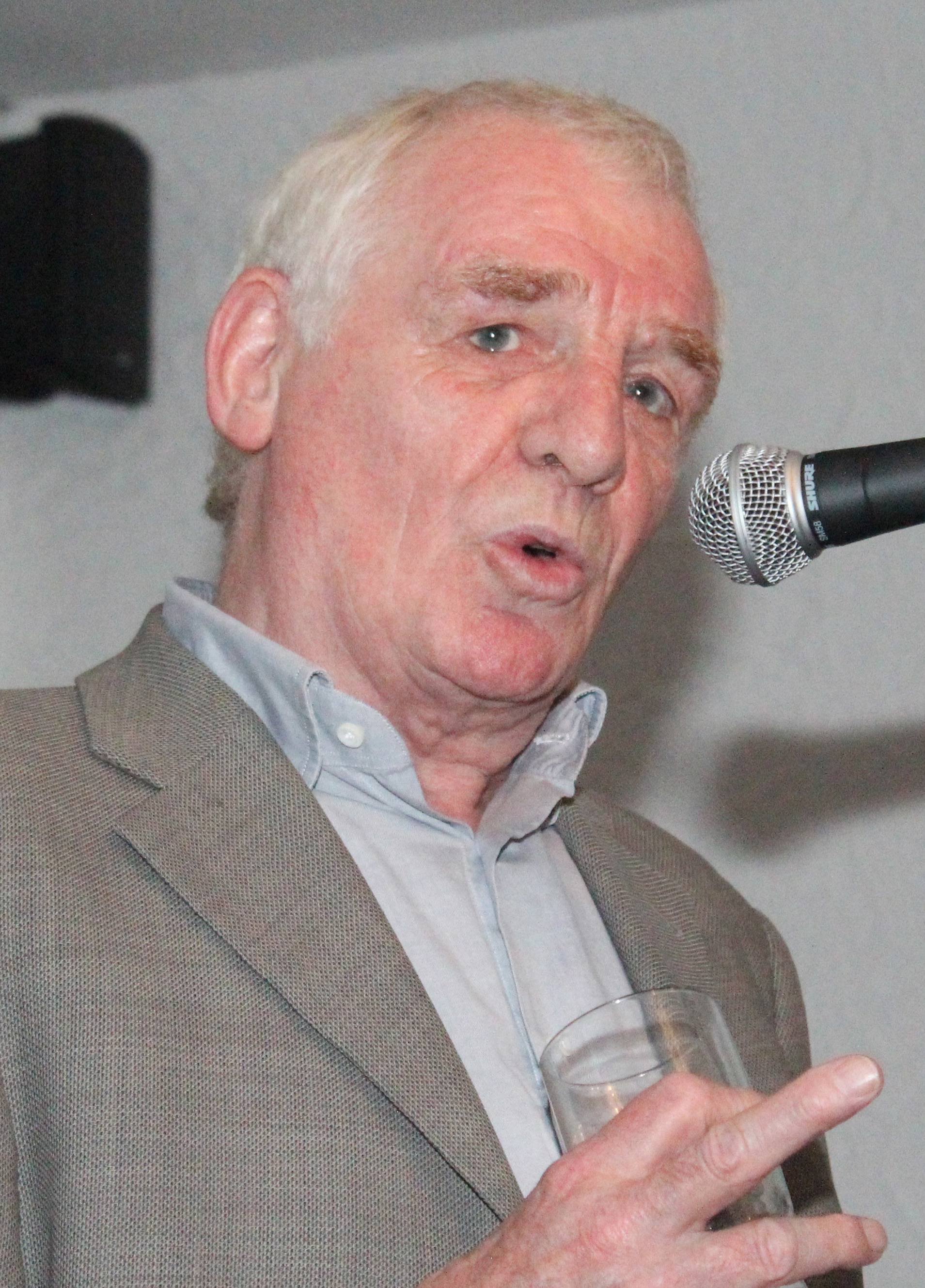
Eamon Dunphy (2013 photo) was a leading proponent of the mid-1990s proposal for Wimbledon to relocate to Dublin.

Hammam later claimed to have looked at every possible stadium site in Merton. He initially sought to relocate within south London, examining "seven boroughs" including Tolworth and Brixton. He also began to consider selling the club. In 1994, Wimbledon's Irish manager Joe Kinnear contacted the football pundit and former player Eamon Dunphy to inform him of this and to put to him the idea of moving the club to Dublin. Dunphy was enthusiastic about the idea and became its main proponent in Ireland over the next three years. It was suggested that Wimbledon fans from London could be given free flights to Dublin for home matches, and that British Sky Broadcasting might pay to fly the opposing teams there during the first season.

Opinion polls in the Republic showed consistently high support for the idea of Wimbledon hosting Premier League matches in Dublin, but the League of Ireland argued that this would endanger its existence, and in September 1996 about 300 fans rallied in Dublin under the slogan "Resist the Dublin Dons". Twenty Irish clubs "reaffirmed their opposition" to Wimbledon playing in Dublin the following month; a week later Reuters called the proposal "dead and buried". When Hammam requested talks with the Football Association of Ireland (FAI) top brass in April 1997, they refused to meet him. Vocal opposition from Wimbledon fans emerged—after a friendly match in August 1997 fans holding "Dublin = Death" and "Dons Belong in Merton" placards refused to leave the stadium for two hours. Soon afterwards, Hammam met six leading protesters, who told him that in the event of a move they would start a new non-League club locally.

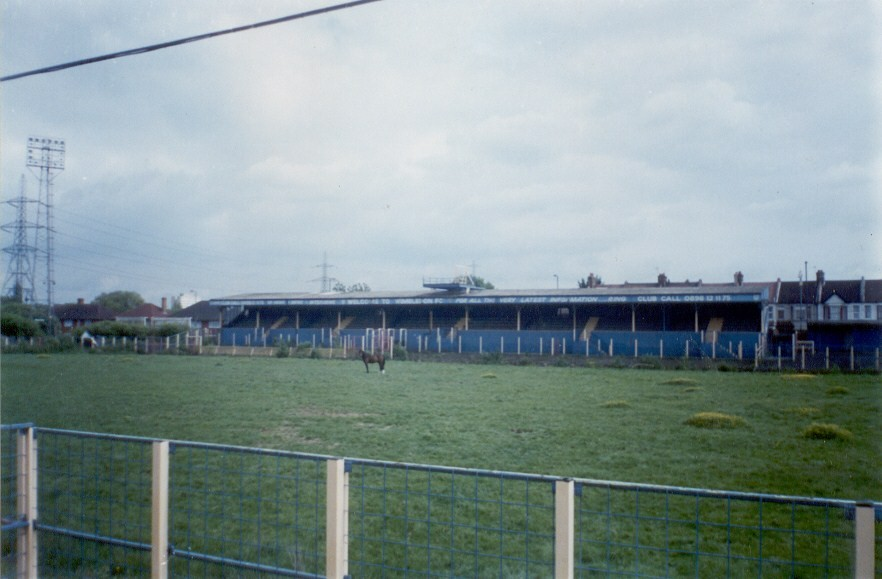
Plough Lane in 2000, standing derelict

Playing away from Merton at a supposedly temporary home, Wimbledon set a record for the lowest-ever English top-flight attendance on 22 August 1992 with 3,759 watching the clash with Coventry City, before breaking it twice more: 12 December 1992 against Oldham Athletic with 3,386, and finally on 26 January 1993, drawing only 3,039 fans to a Tuesday-night match against Everton, with reportedly 1,500 travelling from Liverpool. All ten of the Premier League's lowest attendances were Wimbledon home matches in the 1992–93 and 1993–94 seasons. However the general trend was one of a sharp rise—the club's average home attendance more than doubled at Selhurst Park from around 8,000 during the last years at Plough Lane to a peak of over 18,000 during the 1998–99 Premier League season. Wimbledon's fans were a blend between locals who had supported the club since its non-League days and supporters who had defected from other London teams. According to statistics compiled in 2000, 56% of Wimbledon season-ticket holders were locally born (the second lowest in the Premier League), and only 12% had fathers who were Wimbledon fans. Many attended Wimbledon matches as it was cheaper and perceived as safer than other clubs in the capital—Wimbledon had more women and children at their games than any other top-flight club. In 2000, 23% of Wimbledon season-ticket holders earned over £50,000 a year, the second-highest in the division after Chelsea (33%).

Hammam sold Wimbledon to two Norwegian businessmen, Kjell Inge Røkke and Bjørn Rune Gjelsten, for a reported £26 million in June 1997, while remaining at the club in an advisory role. In December that year, Wimbledon were reported to be considering the football and greyhounds option again. Ownership of Plough Lane was transferred from the club to Rudgwick Limited—a company founded in 1993 with Hammam serving as director. With political control of Merton Council having changed, Hammam secured the £8 million sale of Plough Lane to Safeway supermarkets in 1998. He unsuccessfully attempted to gain permission to redevelop a former gas works in Merton during the same year, and soon after entered abortive negotiations over a site in Beddington.

Frustrated by the lack of progress, Hammam shifted his focus to Dublin and other locations outside London—Basingstoke, "Gatwick", Belfast, Cardiff, Manchester, Wigan, Bristol, and Scotland. He later claimed that during this time seven clubs from outside London approached Wimbledon with groundshare offers. (Note: The clubs Hammam named were Birmingham City, Brighton & Hove Albion, Hull City, Luton Town, Portsmouth, Watford and West Bromwich Albion.) Similar opposition to that emanating from the Irish football hierarchy followed after Kinnear spoke of the Cardiff proposal: the Football Association of Wales stated they "will oppose the plan even if it means Premiership football coming to Cardiff". By February 1998, Clydebank of the Scottish third tier were also pursuing a move to the Irish capital. Swayed by Hammam's offer of £500,000 to each League of Ireland club, the same amount to the FAI and "schools of excellence all over the country" in return for support, five Irish teams now backed Wimbledon's Dublin proposal. Later that year, after the Premier League had approved the idea, the lengthy, heated debate in Ireland ended with an FAI veto. With Dublin now not an option, and Scotland similarly barred, Hammam attempted to buy Selhurst Park from Noades, who had sold Crystal Palace in 1998, but still owned the ground. This led nowhere. Hammam finally sold his shares in Wimbledon in February 2000, and seven months later became the owner of Cardiff City. Wimbledon were relegated from the Premier League at the end of the 1999–2000 season. The average attendance at Wimbledon home matches dropped by more than half over the next year, from 17,157 during the 1999–2000 season to 7,897 during 2000–01.

=== Milton Keynes Stadium Consortium ===
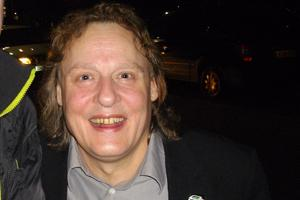
Pete Winkelman, the leader of the Milton Keynes Stadium Consortium, pictured in 2011

The Milton Keynes Stadium Consortium or "Stadium MK", led by Pete Winkelman and his company Inter MK Group, was formed in 2000. It proposed a large development in the southern Milton Keynes district of Denbigh North, including a 30,000-capacity football stadium, a 150,000-square-foot (13,935 m^{2}) Asda hypermarket, an IKEA store, a hotel, a conference centre, and a retail park. The plan to build a ground of this size was complicated by the fact that there was no professional football club in Milton Keynes and that the highest-ranked team in the town, (another) Milton Keynes City—based in Wolverton in northern Milton Keynes, and formerly known as Mercedes-Benz F.C.—played in the then eighth-tier Spartan South Midlands League, four divisions below the Football League. The developers could not justify building such a stadium for a club of this small stature. Rather than wait for MK City or another local team to progress through the pyramid, Winkelman resolved to "import" an established League club to use the ground.

Winkelman, an ex-CBS Records executive and music promoter, had moved to the Milton Keynes area from London in 1993. He attested to a vast untapped fanbase for football in Milton Keynes—a "football frenzy waiting to happen", he said. Critics of this claim pointed to the apparent lack of public interest in Milton Keynes City and the other local non-League clubs, and argued that Milton Keynes residents interested specifically in League football already had ample access with Luton, Northampton and Rushden & Diamonds all within 25 miles (40 km). Winkelman was the only person in Milton Keynes publicly associated with the project; his financial supporters, later revealed to be Asda (then a subsidiary of Walmart) and IKEA, were kept strictly anonymous. According to an investigative report by Ian Pollock, published in When Saturday Comes in July 2002, neither the Milton Keynes Council press office, the editor of the Milton Keynes Citizen newspaper nor the head of Invest in MK, the council agency encouraging businesses to move to the area, could tell him who was backing the plans. Winkelman told Pollock his supporters were "major business people in MK and some developers. A number of major international partners who've done this sort of thing before."

Opponents of such a move surmised that the stadium was a "Trojan Horse" included in the blueprint to bypass planning rules, and that although the consortium described the larger development as enabling the construction of the stadium, the reverse was the case—Winkelman's consortium, they claimed, had to have a professional team in place right away to justify the ground so the development could get planning permission. David Conn of The Guardian corroborated this assessment. "The whole project was indeed dependent on Asda and IKEA," Conn summarised in a 2012 article, after interviewing Winkelman. "Having seen the opportunity to build a stadium Milton Keynes lacked, and realised Asda did not have a store in the town, Winkelman acquired options to buy the land from its three owners, including the council. Asda would not have been granted planning permission for a huge out-of-town superstore unless it gave the council the benefit of building the stadium. [A League club] would move up, permission would be granted, then [Winkelman] would exercise the option to buy all the land, sell it to Asda and IKEA for very much more, and the difference would be used to build the stadium." Conn retrospectively described this as a "deal of a lifetime".

=== Talks with Luton, Wimbledon, Barnet, Crystal Palace and QPR ===
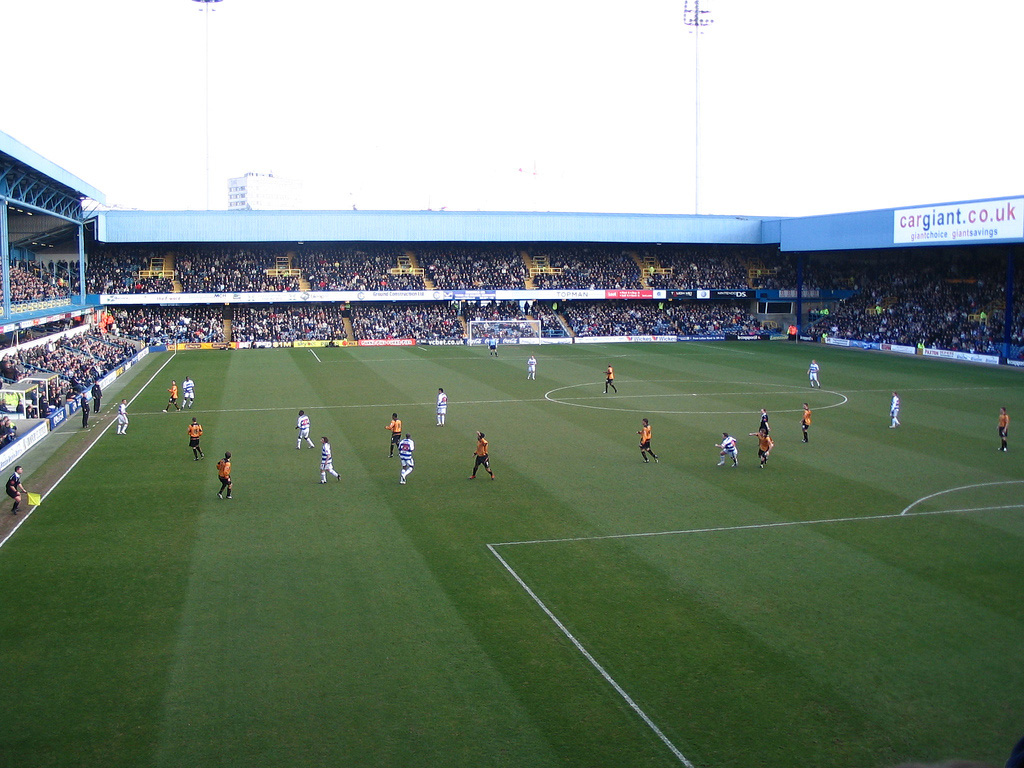
Loftus Road, Queens Park Rangers' home ground (2007 photograph). In 2001 QPR were linked with first a merger with Wimbledon, then a move to Milton Keynes.

The first club approached was Luton Town, still based at Kenilworth Road, in 2000. As in the 1980s, Luton's owners liked the Milton Keynes idea but the fans strongly opposed it. The Football League stated that no member club could leave its own area and blocked the move. Nevertheless, Winkelman attempted to negotiate a move with two League clubs from London over the following months; he approached Crystal Palace and Barnet, but neither was interested. Winkelman then offered the ground to Wimbledon. He registered several internet domain names with variants of "Milton Keynes Dons" and "MK Dons" in June 2000. (Note: These included mkdons.com, mkdons.co.uk, miltonkeynesdons.com and miltonkeynesdons.co.uk, all of which were registered through Tucows Domains on 23 June 2000.) Wimbledon initially rejected the Milton Keynes idea.

Røkke and Gjelsten appointed a new club chairman, Charles Koppel, in January 2001. According to Stephen Morrow in The People's Game?: Football, Finance and Society (2003), Koppel had never been to a football match before becoming involved with Wimbledon and "gave the impression of being completely unaware of the relationship that exists between a football club and its supporters." He was interested in an "enabling development" whereby a stadium could be created and funded as part of a business or leisure opportunity—exactly the kind of proposition put forward by Winkelman.

Towards the end of the 2000–01 season Wimbledon and Queens Park Rangers, who were in financial administration, entered discussions over a merger; the new team would play at Loftus Road. The Football League announced on 2 May 2001 that it would give "favourable consideration" to a takeover of QPR by Wimbledon, but that the process would have to be very quick for the merged team to take part in the 2001–02 season. Noades—by now the owner of Brentford, who were themselves interested in a move out of Griffin Park, either to groundshare at Loftus Road or to a move to Woking,—said that Wimbledon would have to give him 12 months' notice to leave Selhurst Park. The majority of Wimbledon and QPR fans quickly made their opposition to a merger known. Following Wimbledon's draw with Norwich City at Selhurst Park on 6 May, Koppel came onto the pitch and told the mostly jeering home fans that "there never was a merger proposal with QPR"; the Loftus Road club had instigated the talks, he said. QPR abandoned the amalgamation plan two days later, citing potential fan alienation, while also announcing that there would be no further talks with Brentford, who would seek and eventually obtain an option to move into Kingstonian's ground Kingsmeadow, before Noades sold his shares in Brentford to Bees United in January 2006, with the club still at Griffin Park.

A month later, Winkelman offered his Milton Keynes stadium site to QPR, promising that the club's name and blue-and-white hooped strip would be kept in Buckinghamshire and that the fans would be represented on the board of directors. "We have real resources to put behind the club," said Winkelman. "They are fast running out of solutions and we are the answer to their problems." QPR dismissed the offer, leading the developers to once again contact Wimbledon later that month. With Koppel in charge, Wimbledon were more receptive this time around—Koppel said that Wimbledon's owners were subsidising the club to the tune of £6 million per year and that such action was necessary to prevent its liquidation. As talks progressed, Winkelman approached the owner of Milton Keynes City, attempting to buy the club name. It soon became clear that the bulk of Wimbledon's support strongly opposed a move of this kind.

== Authorisation process ==
=== Announcement and rejection; appeal ===
Locations of Plough Lane, Selhurst Park and Milton Keynes

Koppel announced Wimbledon Football Club's intent to move to Milton Keynes on 2 August 2001 with a letter to the Football League chief executive David Burns requesting approval. The letter stated that Wimbledon had already signed an agreement to relocate and "subject to the necessary planning and regulatory consents being obtained" intended to be playing home games at a newly built stadium in Milton Keynes by the start of the 2003–04 season. The proposed move was opposed by the Football League, the Football Association Merton Council, many national football writers, and a 150-member Parliamentary All-Party Committee, along with many Wimbledon fans and other supporters. Two similar club relocations had occurred in the Scottish professional ranks during the 1990s, but the permanent relocation of an English League club to another conurbation was unprecedented. A group of Wimbledon fans decided to boycott club merchandise in protest against the plans, and launched an "alternative matchday programme for both home and away fans", Yellow and Blue, to compete against the official publication. The League board unanimously rejected Wimbledon's proposed move on 16 August 2001, stating that any Milton Keynes club would have to earn membership by progressing through the pyramid and that "franchised football" would be "disastrous".

Koppel appealed against this decision, calling it and the process by which it was reached "deficient and unlawful"; he insisted that re-basing in Milton Keynes was the only way Wimbledon could survive. Burns expressed strong personal opposition in response, declaring that allowing such a move would "destroy what football is about". To consider whether Wimbledon had the right to contest the League's decision, the Football Association formed an ad hoc arbitration panel made up of FA vice-chairman and Arsenal vice-chairman David Dein, York City chairman Douglas Craig, and Charles Hollander QC. Some observers criticised the inclusion of Craig on the panel, citing his prior actions as York City chairman; he had sold his club's stadium Bootham Crescent to a holding company he also owned for £165,000 in July 1999, then in December 2001 announced his intention to evict the team and sell the ground for £4.5 million. Winkelman told reporters that even if the appeal were unsuccessful "our door will be open to any club in trouble".

After considering extensive written evidence from Wimbledon F.C., the Football League, the FA, the Premier League, the Football Conference, the Scottish Football League, Milton Keynes City F.C., Merton Council, the Football Supporters' Association and the Wimbledon Independent Supporters Association (WISA), and oral submissions from Koppel, Burns and Andrew Judge of Merton Council, the arbitration panel unanimously ruled on 29 January 2002 that the League's decision had "not been properly taken in the legal sense, and that the procedures had not been fair"—the League, the panel reported, had rejected Wimbledon's application "not on its merits, but on the basis of an inflexible view or policy". The question of Wimbledon's proposed move was remitted to the Football League board, which reconvened on 17 April 2002 and concluded that the matter should be considered by an independent commission appointed by the Football Association.

The FA agreed and in the first week of May appointed Raj Parker of the Freshfields Bruckhaus Deringer law firm to chair the commission, with Steve Stride, Aston Villa's operations director, and Alan Turvey, member of the FA Council and chairman of the Isthmian League, as commissioners. Under FA Rule 'F', the Football League and Wimbledon were informed of these appointments; neither objected. Acknowledging Koppel's request that the matter be resolved by the end of the month because of Wimbledon's financial problems, the FA set a deadline of 31 May 2002 for the commission's "final and binding" verdict, and released a press statement on 10 May inviting anyone interested to send written submissions care of the FA. By this time, the fans' matchday publication Yellow and Blue was outselling the official Wimbledon F.C. programme by three to one.

=== Independent commission; approval ===
Parker, Stride and Turvey sat at Freshfields Bruckhaus Deringer's Fleet Street offices on 14, 15, 16 and 22 May 2002. Legal counsel instructed by Olswang appeared for Wimbledon; the League, which had engaged external lawyers for the arbitration hearing, this time did not, deciding that its objections were adequately set out in the written material. The League and FA contributions were summarised in the commission report as concerns that a relocated club would, in effect, "drive a coach and horses through the pyramid structure", "herald, or risk heralding, a franchise system for football whereby the investors in football could relocate clubs at will" and "dramatically change the defining characteristics of the English domestic game where clubs are identified with the locality or community built up over time". "English football is not organised on the basis of a franchise system in which different communities may bid for clubs competing in competitions," the FA statement concluded. "If a move effectively involved a break of the links with the community with which the club is traditionally associated, and a move to an entirely new community, with an intent to put down new roots and reinvent the club with a new identity and a new set of allegiances, and yet the club did not want to relinquish its place in the pyramid, go down to a lower level and work its way back up, the FA believes that allowing such a move would have a fundamental impact on the organisational framework of the game."

Wimbledon's statement centred on the club's precarious financial situation and a claim that its case was unique. It stressed that Wimbledon (referred to in the statement as "WFC") had lacked its own home stadium for 11 years and asserted that the club did not have "firm and extensive roots within the conurbation from which it takes its name". According to the club statement, "the vast majority" of Wimbledon fans were not from Merton and "less than 20% of the 3,400 season ticket holders" lived there. Milton Keynes was, the statement said, Wimbledon's "last chance of financial survival"; the move's opponents did not properly appreciate the club's fiscal troubles and "wrongly assume[d] that there is a viable alternative in south London." The new ground in Milton Keynes was feasible despite the club's financial problems as it would be almost entirely funded by the consortium's enabling development. Wimbledon's identity—"traditions, history, colours, name, strip, stadium design and the like"—would be preserved in Milton Keynes and supporters from London would be offered subsidised travel and tickets. The statement concluded that "infinitely more harm would be caused to football if WFC went out of business" and that a "proportionate exercise of discretion ... would allow the relocation in WFC's exceptional circumstances."

The commissioners heard oral statements from Winkelman, Koppel, Louise Carton-Kelly of the Dons Trust fundraising group, Kris Stewart of the WISA, Nicholas Coward of the FA and Steve Clark, Merton Council's head of planning. Winkelman was described in the report as "a passionate and frank witness, who is genuinely concerned to promote the interests of Milton Keynes and WFC." He expressed a wish to retain Wimbledon's "name, strip, branding and the like", and spoke of renaming local roads and calling the stadium site "Wimbledon Park". Winkelman predicted that an overwhelming majority of Wimbledon fans would continue to follow the club in Milton Keynes. The commission summarised the fans' submitted views as almost universally negative and reported that most perceived a continuation of the club in Milton Keynes as no better than liquidation. Stewart, when asked if he would prefer life for the club in Milton Keynes or death in Merton, said he regarded both as death and that in either case he would attempt to "resurrect the club and start at the bottom of the pyramid".

The commission report described redeveloping Plough Lane, which Merton Council insisted remained viable "if there is a will for the club to pursue this option", as the only recourse for Wimbledon other than Milton Keynes. A feasibility study carried out by Drivers Jonas, commissioned and funded jointly by Wimbledon F.C. and Merton Council, described a 20,000-capacity stadium at Plough Lane as physically possible but "extremely ambitious", risky and financially unsustainable given the club's money problems. The commission ruled that it was unreasonable to expect Wimbledon's owners to pursue a move back to Plough Lane under these circumstances. Parker and Stride concluded that on the evidence presented Milton Keynes was the only option that would give the club a chance of financial survival, and therefore ruled in favour of the move, two to one—Turvey dissented—on 28 May 2002.

== Relocation ==
Wimbledon F.C. and AFC Wimbledon are named in full throughout the following sections to avoid ambiguity.

=== 2002–03 ===
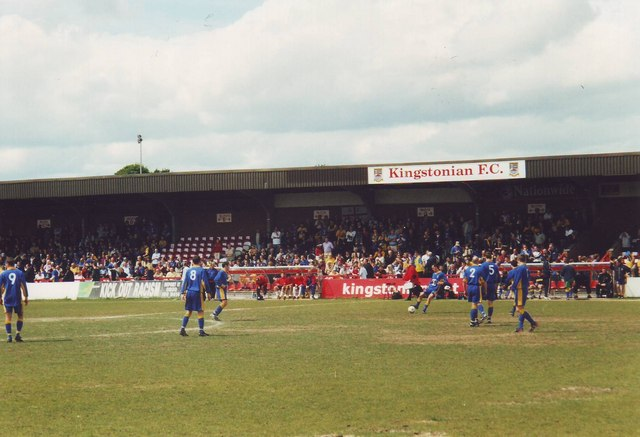
AFC Wimbledon (blue shirts) warm up before taking on Raynes Park Vale in a Combined Counties League game at Kingsmeadow, on the last day of the 2002–03 season.

The FA stated that although the decision was final and binding, it still strongly opposed the relocation. It emphasised that its recommendation to the commissioners had been against the move. "The Football Association sees it as vital for the game to stop these circumstances ever happening again," the statement concluded. The chief executive of the FA, Adam Crozier, said that he believed the commission to have made an "appalling decision". Koppel said the decision had saved Wimbledon Football Club. A spokesman for Milton Keynes Council said the people of Milton Keynes were looking forward to the team's arrival, stating: "It will be of great benefit to the city. Milton Keynes is becoming a city of sport." In the eyes of the WISA, the Dons Trust and most of the Wimbledon F.C. fanbase, the move's sanctioning marked the "death of their club". "If it moves it will mean nothing to us," said Marc Jones, a WISA spokesman. Wimbledon F.C. became widely reviled by football supporters across the country and pejoratively nicknamed by some as "Franchise F.C.".

A group of disaffected Wimbledon F.C. fans led by Stewart, Jones, Ivor Heller and Trevor Williams resolved to found their own team, in their view a spiritual continuation or "phoenix" version of the original. Within weeks, they had done so; the new side, AFC Wimbledon, entered a groundshare arrangement with Kingstonian at the latter club's home ground at Kingsmeadow, in the Royal Borough of Kingston upon Thames, adjacent to Merton and about 5 miles (8 km) from Plough Lane. The fans' club was accepted into the Combined Counties League, seven levels below Wimbledon F.C.'s place in the second tier, and began play at the start of the 2002–03 season. The WISA, the Dons Trust and the vast majority of Wimbledon F.C.'s fanbase switched allegiance to the new club. The assertion in the commission report that "resurrecting the club from its ashes as, say, 'Wimbledon Town'" would be "not in the wider interests of football" particularly infuriated AFC Wimbledon's founders and became an integral part of club lore.

Wimbledon F.C. hoped to move to Milton Keynes immediately, but as the new ground was yet to be built an interim home in the town would have to be found first. The first proposal, to start the 2002–03 season at the National Hockey Stadium in central Milton Keynes, was abandoned because it did not meet Football League stadium criteria. While alternative temporary options were examined—Winkelman suggested converting the National Bowl music venue—Wimbledon F.C. started the season at Selhurst Park and set a target of playing in MK by Christmas. Central Milton Keynes Shopping Centre became the team's new sponsor; "GO–MK" was emblazoned across the players' shirts. Before Wimbledon F.C.'s first game of the season, against Gillingham on 10 August 2002, AFC Wimbledon supporters picketed outside Selhurst Park, tried to dissuade home fans from entering and shouted "scab" and "scum" at those who did. The attendance was officially announced as 2,476, including 1,808 from Gillingham. The breakaway club claimed an average crowd of over 3,700 during its first months, while Wimbledon F.C. attracted less than 3,000, most of whom were followers of visiting teams. The loss of income from gate receipts would contribute to Wimbledon F.C. subsequently entering administration.

Safeway demolished Plough Lane and sold the site to a property developer in November 2002. Milton Keynes Council meanwhile granted planning permission to convert the National Bowl into a temporary football stadium, but the Football League delayed a decision on these plans in October 2002. At Selhurst Park, Wimbledon F.C. reported a divisional record low attendance of only 849—including over 200 away fans, around the same number of complimentary tickets, and Wimbledon F.C. youth players and members of the press—for the Tuesday-night game against Rotherham United on 29 October 2002, setting a post-Second World War record for the top two tiers. A temporary stadium in Milton Keynes proved difficult to arrange and Wimbledon F.C. remained in south London at the end of the season. On the field, the side finished the second-tier campaign in 10th place. Koppel re-adopted the National Hockey Stadium as his preferred interim destination, announcing a plan to convert the stadium for football and play there from the start of the 2003–04 season.

=== 2003–04 ===
The College of Arms had informed Wimbledon F.C. in August 2002 that its continued use of the Wimbledon double-headed eagle device for its logo was illegal, so the club adopted a new badge before the 2003–04 season. It featured a stylised eagle's head drawn in navy blue and yellow outline, the yellow forming the letters "MK". The club was concurrently compelled to stop using a Womble for its mascot after the owners of the Wombles brand refused to renew the relevant licence agreement in protest against the move to Milton Keynes. (Note: The Wimbledon F.C. mascot had been called Wandle the Womble. A similar character, Haydon the Womble, became AFC Wimbledon's mascot in 2006.) Tottenham Hotspur, Charlton Athletic and Luton Town scheduled pre-season friendly matches against Wimbledon F.C., but then cancelled them in quick succession after each set of supporters protested. Koppel accused the WISA of orchestrating a campaign against the club, and said the Tottenham and Charlton friendlies had been cancelled in part because of concerns that the National Hockey Stadium might not be ready on time (Luton would have been an away match). It was widely speculated that Wimbledon F.C. would be "renamed, 'rebranded' even" after moving, with "MK Dons" reported in the press as a possible new name, but Koppel denied this. "It remains Wimbledon Football Club. That is our history and the tradition of the club," he said.

On 5 June 2003 Gjelsten told Koppel he could not go on subsidising Wimbledon F.C., and withheld the scheduled monthly injection of £800,000. Koppel declared Wimbledon F.C. insolvent the next day and put it into administration with reported debts of £3.5 million. John Gurney, who had just become the chairman of Luton Town following a takeover by a consortium from Hong Kong and the United States, briefly floated the idea of buying Wimbledon F.C. and merging it with Luton, in his words "effectively buying a back door to Division One" (Luton were in the division below), but was soon ousted by Luton supporters. In late June, after Wimbledon F.C. missed a deadline to invest in renovations to the Hockey Stadium, the National Hockey Foundation pulled out of discussions over the ground's use, creating confusion as to where the club would now be located. The administrators said on 27 June that as things stood the move to Milton Keynes was off. A week later, after Watford refused to let Wimbledon F.C. share their ground at Vicarage Road, the administrators announced a return to Selhurst Park.

Winkelman had not intended to own Wimbledon F.C. himself; his plan had been to work alongside it while the stadium was built in Denbigh and then give the ground to the club in exchange for shares and a place on the board. He had not expected it to go into administration. With the move threatened and the club facing liquidation, he made "the life-defining decision", to quote Conn, "of taking it on himself". He secured funds from his consortium for the administrators to pay the players' wages, keep the club operating, and pay for the necessary renovations for the National Hockey Stadium to host League football. (Note: Two new stands holding 2,000 people–one of which being the designated away end, the West Stand–were constructed in addition to the 1995-built field hockey arena's existing ends: a 4,000-capacity main stand (the only sheltered accommodation at the site) and the smaller 1,000-seater section opposite, bringing the National Hockey Stadium's capacity up from 4,000 to 9,000. Other renovations included a new football pitch to replace the facility's former field hockey pitch and the addition of floodlights, turnstiles, and closed-circuit television. The replacement of the artificial turf with grass prevented the Stadium from being used for field hockey.) He made clear that his group's interest was conditional on the club moving to Milton Keynes. In late July Winkelman and the club's administrators concluded a deal with the Hockey Stadium's owners to carry out conversion work and play there from October—Wimbledon F.C. would return to Selhurst Park in the meantime. Meanwhile, Milton Keynes City F.C. went out of business before the start of the season following an unsuccessful drive for new directors and investors.

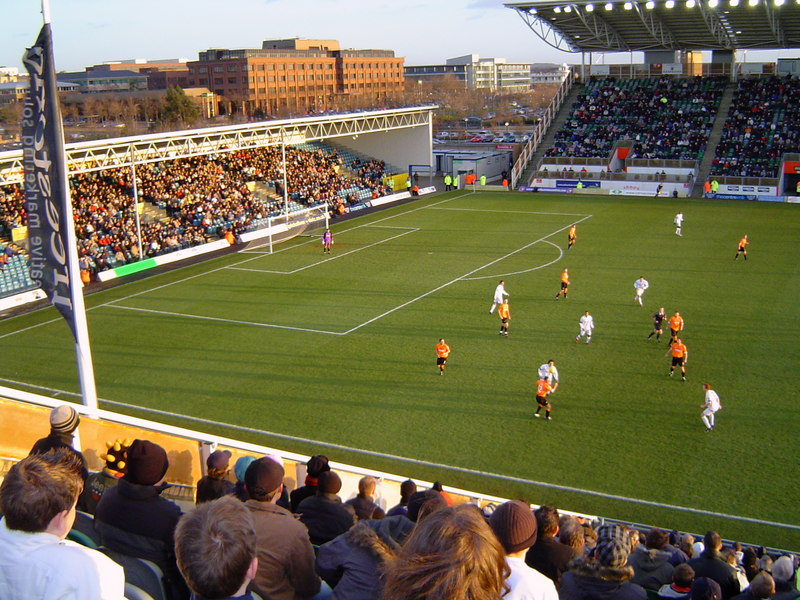
Milton Keynes Dons (white shirts) play against Blackpool at the National Hockey Stadium during the 2004–05 season.

After hosting the first few home matches of the campaign at Selhurst Park—1,054 saw them lose 4–2 to Wigan Athletic in their last home game in London—Wimbledon F.C. received Football League clearance to host matches at the National Hockey Stadium on 19 September 2003, and eight days later played their first match in Milton Keynes, against Burnley. The game drew a crowd of 5,639, including 893 away fans. Wimbledon F.C. went two goals down before coming back to draw 2–2; Dean Holdsworth scored the club's first goal in Milton Keynes. The team struggled on and off the pitch for the rest of the season, losing important players regularly as the administrators sold them to keep the club afloat, and eventually finished bottom of the second-tier First Division. Attendances at the National Hockey Stadium were higher than those at Selhurst Park during the 2002–03 season, but lower than those of the 2001–02 season. The 2–1 defeat to Sunderland on 7 April 2004 that confirmed Wimbledon F.C.'s relegation was attended by 4,800, of whom 2,380 were away fans.

After Gjelsten agreed to write off the £24 million he and Røkke had lent to the club since 1997, a company voluntary arrangement (CVA) was put together on 18 March 2004 under which Winkelman's consortium would take Wimbledon F.C. out of administration, reportedly using a holding company called MK Dons. This was accepted by most of Wimbledon F.C.'s creditors, but delayed while the Inland Revenue decided whether or not to pursue the club's £525,000 debt to the UK taxpayer before the Law Lords. The Football League threatened to expel the club if the takeover were not completed by 31 July. In May Property Week reported that the new stadium in Denbigh would be cancelled if Wimbledon F.C. were wound up. Richard Foreman, a director of the consortium's development consultant, denied this, saying that the project would continue with "the total support of the council"; the consortium would invite another League team to move, he said, and would have 18 months to do so. This did not prove necessary. After the Inland Revenue announced on 27 May that it would not pursue the club's debt, Winkelman's Inter MK Group brought Wimbledon F.C. out of administration in late June 2004, paying £850,000 for the club, and concurrently announced changes to its name, badge and colours.

=== MK Dons and AFC Wimbledon ===
MK Dons home kit, 2004–05
AFC Wimbledon home kit, 2004–05

The new name of the relocated club was Milton Keynes Dons F.C. (commonly shortened to MK Dons). Inter MK explained that this name was intended to "represent the past, present and future and place the club at the heart of its new community" as well as to retain a connection with the club's former identity. The Football League gave final approval to the CVA on 1 July 2004, and the same day confirmed the transfer of the Wimbledon F.C. League share to Milton Keynes Dons Ltd. (Note: The old company, The Wimbledon Football Club Ltd, legally endured until 2009.)

The blue and yellow home colours that Wimbledon F.C. players had worn (Note: Having worn the inverse colour scheme from 1974 to 1976 and from 1978, Wimbledon F.C. assumed blue and yellow for their home strip from 1981, though from 1993 until 2004, the shade used was navy blue.) were replaced by white shirts, shorts and socks, with black, red and gold as accent colours. The first MK Dons away outfit comprised red shirts, shorts and socks. Both white and red had been used by Wimbledon F.C. as away colours over the previous two decades. The club badge became a rendering of the letters "MK", with the "K" positioned below the "M", rotated 90° anti-clockwise and defaced with the year "MMIV" (2004).

In line with its self-perception as the spiritual continuation of Wimbledon F.C., AFC Wimbledon attempts to emulate the original team's appearance in almost every way. The fans' club plays in the same blue and yellow home colours and uses the Wimbledon double-headed eagle for its badge. (Note: AFC Wimbledon launched in the 2002 pre-season in a blue and white Umbro uniform reminiscent of Wimbledon F.C.'s kit when they won the FA Amateur Cup, beating Sutton United in the Final in 1963, featuring the sponsor Sports Interactive's logo where a club badge would traditionally appear. The identity they assumed upon starting in the Combined Counties League later that year, according to Moor, was the "mid-blue and yellow associated with Wimbledon [F.C.]'s rise to the top of the Football League and the crest was based on the older version worn by the older club".) AFC Wimbledon continue to use the "Dons" nickname, despite its synchronous use in Milton Keynes. They also retain the "Wombles" label formerly applied to Wimbledon Football Club.

=== Stadium MK ===
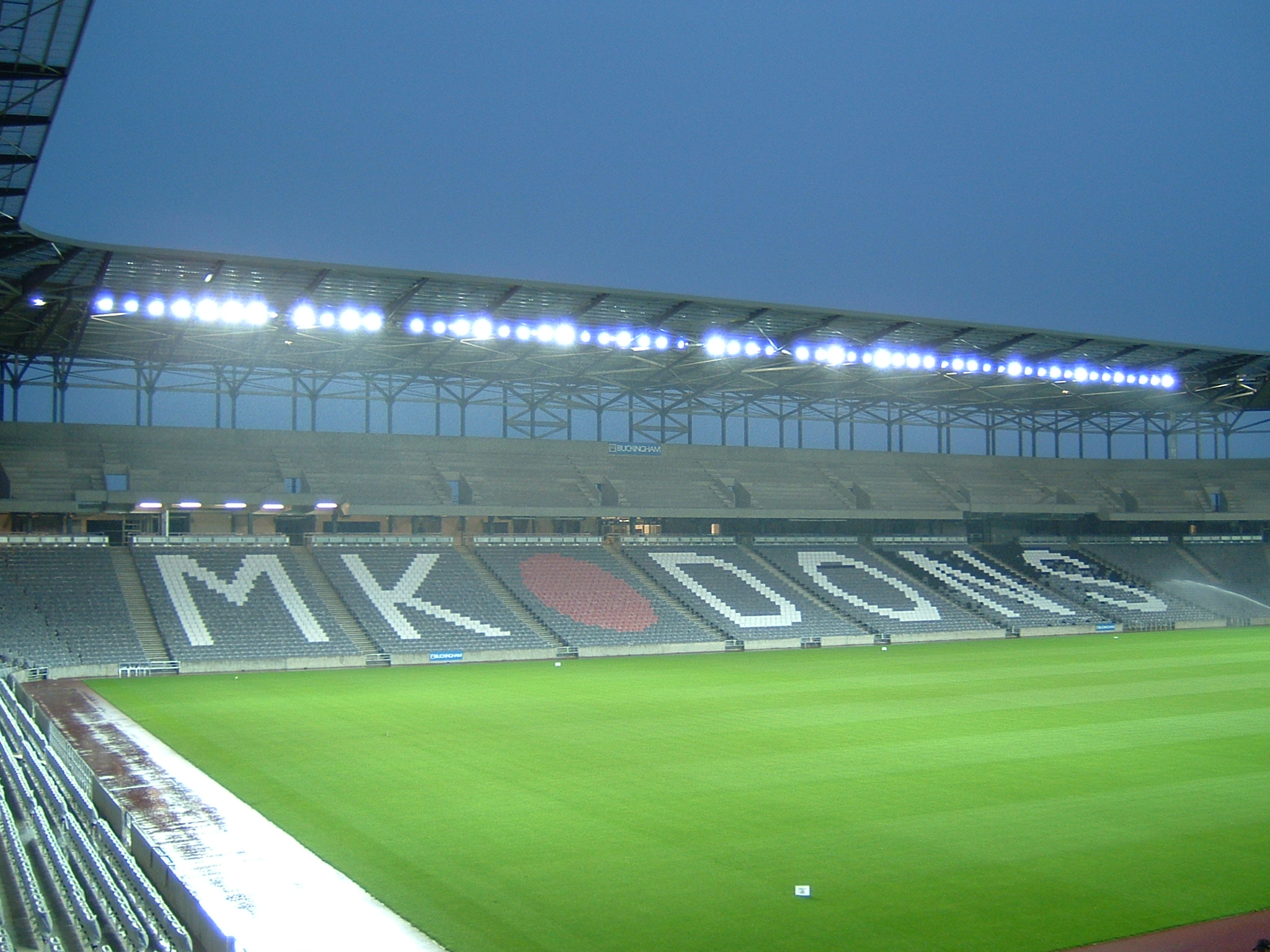
Stadium MK in May 2007, soon before its official opening

Milton Keynes Dons continued to play at the National Hockey Stadium while the development including the new ground was constructed in Denbigh. Asda paid Inter MK £35 million for its section of the site, Ikea £24 million. Ground was broken on the stadium in February 2005. In December 2005 MK Dons set a target of playing at the new ground by January 2007; in February 2007 they revised their proposal to a 22,000-seater stadium ready in July of that year, with provision for expansion to 32,000 (it had originally been intended to seat 30,000). The new ground, named Stadium MK, hosted its first match in July 2007.

MK Dons' last match at the National Hockey Stadium was on 18 May: the home leg of the semi-final of the League Two play-offs in 2007, a 2–1 loss to Shrewsbury Town. The supersession of the Hockey Stadium by field hockey facilities in the Queen Elizabeth Olympic Park–firstly the Riverbank Arena, and latterly the Lee Valley Hockey and Tennis Centre–rendered it redundant so after the Dons' departure for Denbigh, it was demolished in 2010, having not been notably used for its eponym since 2003. Network Rail's new national centre, Quadrant:MK, opened on the site in June 2012.

=== Plough Lane ===
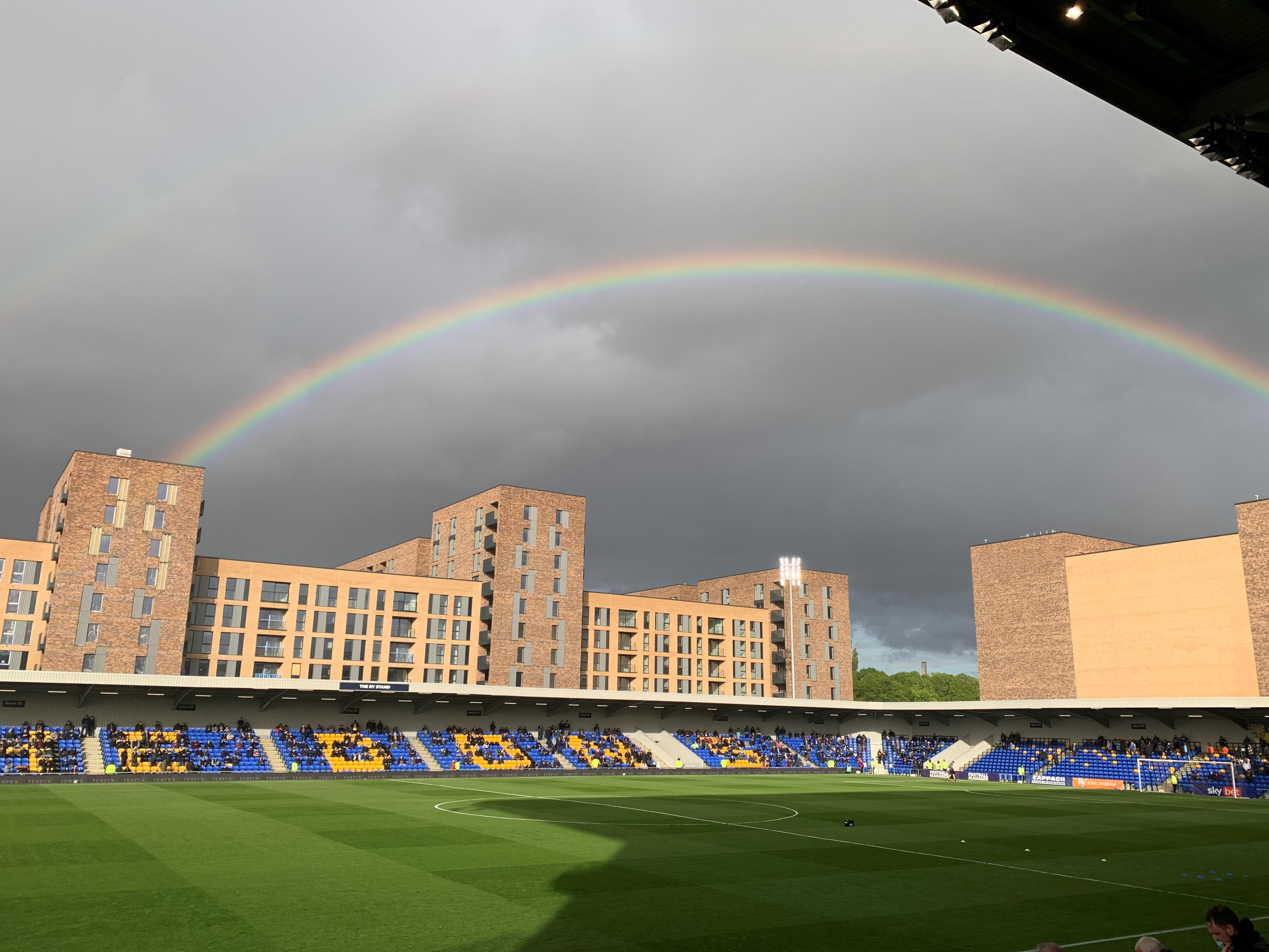
Plough Lane in May 2021

In December 2015 Merton Borough Council granted AFC Wimbledon planning permission to build a new 11,000-seater stadium on Plough Lane, with provision for expansion to 20,000, on the site of the greyhound stadium less than a mile from where the former Wimbledon F.C. ground stood. The plans also include 602 homes. Jim White suggested in the Daily Telegraph that a move to this site on Plough Lane would "represent the most romantic of homecoming stories" for AFC Wimbledon, but the proposal met with caustic opposition from the dog racing community as it would leave their sport without a track in London.

The plans were put on hold in March 2016 when London Mayor Boris Johnson decided to review Merton Council's decision following objections from neighbouring Wandsworth, but his successor Sadiq Khan reversed this stance in August 2016. A month later the Secretary of State for Communities and Local Government Sajid Javid announced that the government would allow Merton Council's decision to stand. AFC Wimbledon's chief executive Erik Samuelson said in response: "Now, at long last, we can start planning with confidence to give AFC Wimbledon a secure future at the heart of the community the club represents. After so many years in exile, the Dons are coming home." The Daily Telegraph predicted in October 2016 that the first AFC Wimbledon match at the new ground would be in 2019.

The plan itself was not without controversy due to concerns that it made Kingstonian F.C.'s future uncertain, with them unable to play in a ground that was seen as too big and expensive for a non-League side and one over which they no longer had any decision. Wimbledon eventually sold Kingsmeadow to Chelsea to provide part of the financing for their new stadium.

The new Plough Lane as built was a scaled-back version of the original plan, with a single permanent stand and three semi-permanent ones designed to be easily replaced at a later date, with a total capacity of just over 9,000. The club's first game at Plough Lane was in November 2020 against Doncaster Rovers.

== Legacy of Wimbledon F.C. ==
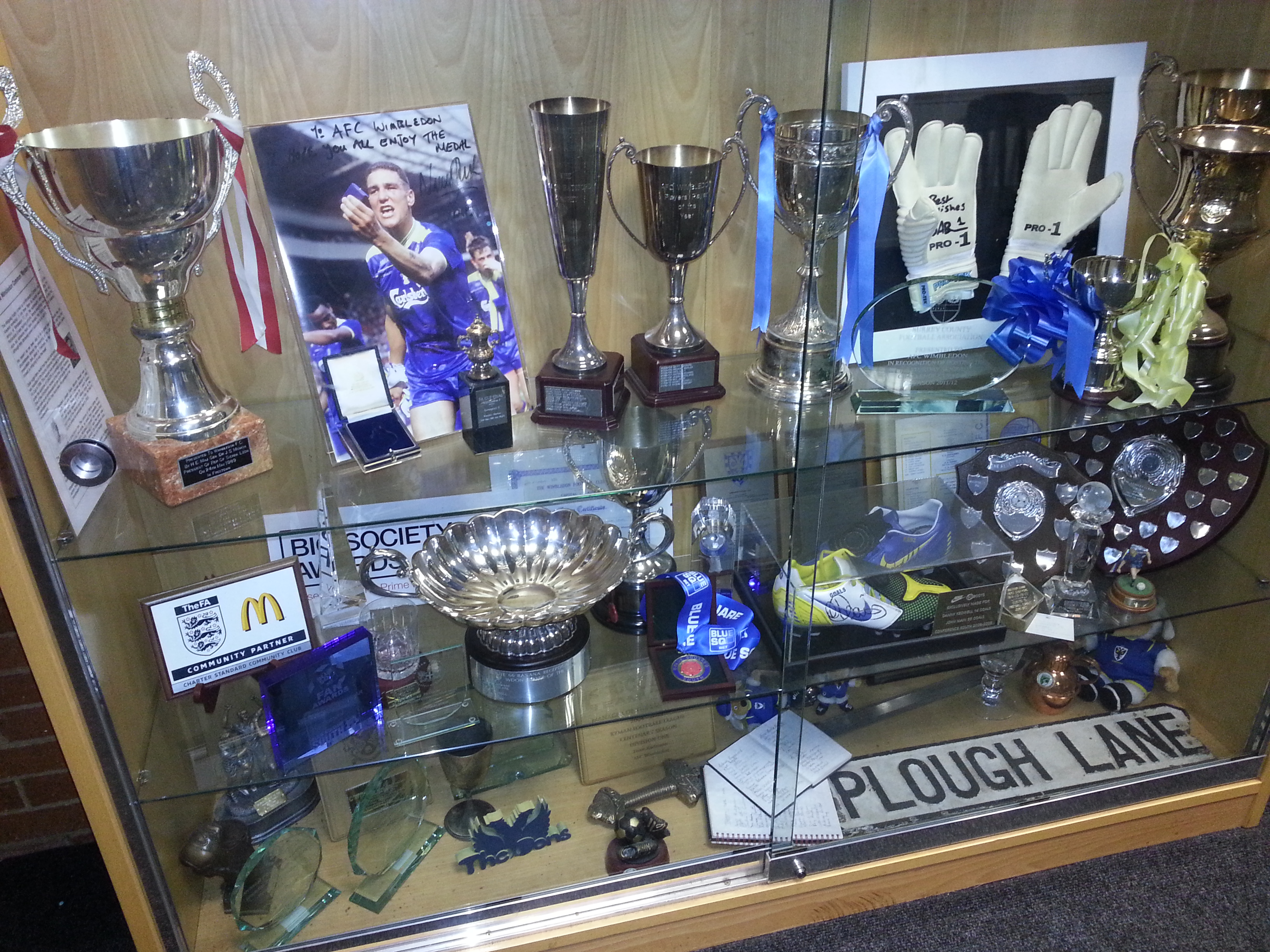
Wimbledon F.C. and AFC Wimbledon trophies and memorabilia, exhibited together at Kingsmeadow in 2012

The location of the history and legacy of Wimbledon F.C., as well as the honours won by the club, was disputed for four years after the independent commission's approval of the move on 28 May 2002. In the view of AFC Wimbledon and that club's supporters, the "identity of a football club is implicitly bound up in its community". The club regards itself as Wimbledon F.C.'s spiritual continuation to this day, holding that the community maintaining and backing AFC Wimbledon is the same one which originally formed Wimbledon Old Centrals (later Wimbledon F.C.) in 1889, "and kept Wimbledon Football Club alive until May 2002".

MK Dons initially maintained that any debate was pointless as their club was simply a renamed Wimbledon F.C. Winkelman was unequivocal when answering readers' questions in FourFourTwo magazine in November 2004: "MK Dons and AFC Wimbledon share the same heritage, but we're the real child of Wimbledon", he wrote. One reader asked: "Now that you have renamed the team, and changed the badge and colours, do you agree that AFC Wimbledon now carry the true spirit of Wimbledon?"; Winkelman replied that AFC Wimbledon's founders had betrayed their club and "left their team before their team left them". In another answer, he poured scorn on suggestions that he might give Wimbledon F.C.'s trophy replicas to AFC Wimbledon, writing that the fans had "abdicated their right to it when they all walked away." "The fans who have continued to support us from London—they're the ones who've had to put up with this shit for so long," he concluded.

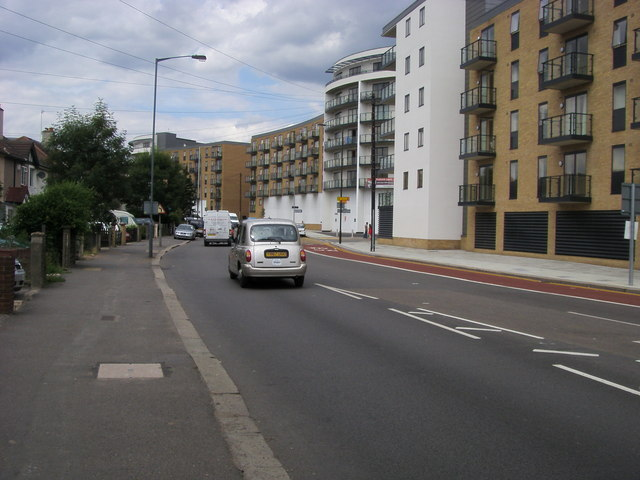
Passing the site of the original Plough Lane ground in 2009. Blocks were named after figures from Wimbledon's past: Dave Bassett, Allen Batsford, Alan Cork, Stanley Reed, Harry Stannard, and Lawrie Sanchez, while the development proper was named Reynolds Gate, after Eddie Reynolds.

The Wimbledon Independent Supporters Association founded the Wimbledon Old Players Association (WOPA) in September 2005 as part of its drive to "reclaim the history of Wimbledon Football Club for AFC Wimbledon and/or the community of Wimbledon". Membership was opened to any former Wimbledon F.C. or AFC Wimbledon player or manager. There were 60 founder members. A "Wimbledon" team, organised by WOPA and backed by AFC Wimbledon, played in the London Masters indoor football tournament in July 2006. (Note: The nine-man team included seven ex-Wimbledon F.C. players—Marcus Gayle, Scott Fitzgerald, Alan Reeves, Alan Kimble, Carlton Fairweather, Andy Clarke and Dean Holdsworth—and one formerly of AFC Wimbledon, Glenn Mulcaire. The goalkeeper was Gary Phillips.) Plough Lane was replaced by a residential development comprising six blocks of flats. Representatives of AFC Wimbledon, the WISA, Merton Council, Barratt Homes and the Dons Trust attended a ceremony in November 2008 at which the development's gate and each of the buildings was named after a figure from Wimbledon F.C.'s past.

Despite Winkelman's strong words in 2004, his club later agreed to hold talks with the Football Supporters' Federation (FSF), the MK Dons Supporters Association and the WISA. The FSF was refusing to admit MK Dons supporters, discouraging friendly matches against MK Dons, and urging football fans generally to boycott MK Dons home games. The parties reached an agreement in October 2006. The FSF would end its calls for a boycott and admit MK supporters as members, and in return MK Dons would "recognise and genuinely regret the hurt which was caused to supporters of the former Wimbledon F.C. by the move to Milton Keynes", renounce any claim to Wimbledon F.C.'s history up to 2004 and transfer the Wimbledon F.C. trophy replicas, copyrights, web domain names and other patrimony to Merton Borough. (Note: For statistical purposes 7 August 2004, the date of MK Dons' first League match under that name, was settled upon as the dividing line between separate Wimbledon F.C. and MK Dons records.) All of this was done in August 2007. The Wimbledon F.C. trophies were put on display at Morden Library in Merton in April 2008.

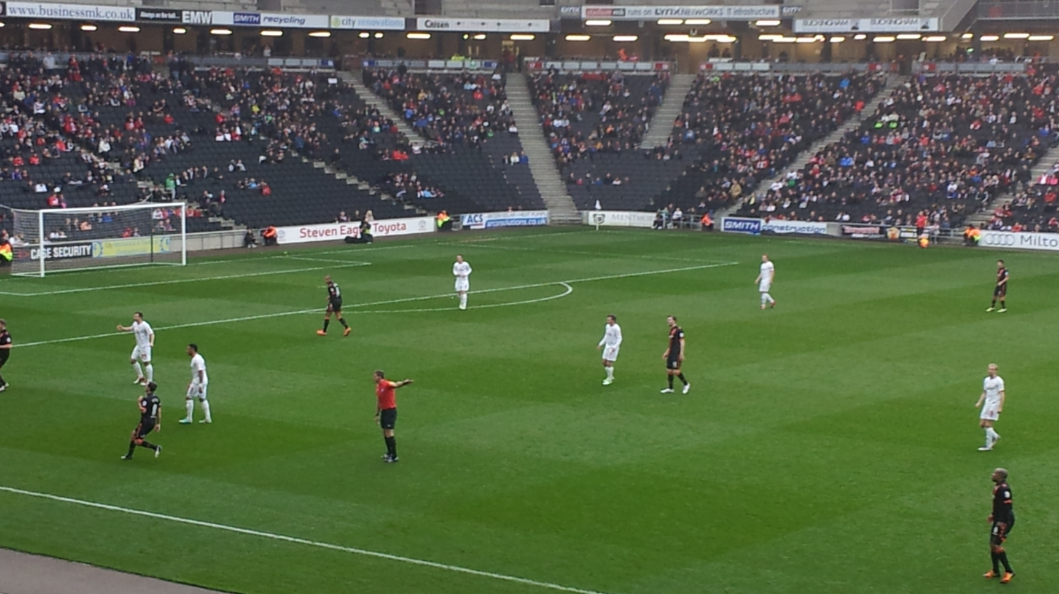
MK Dons playing at home to Sheffield United in League One, 2012

Sections of MK Dons' fans continue to relate to their club's former identity as Wimbledon. When AFC Wimbledon and MK Dons met on the playing field for the first time in 2012, some MK supporters wore scarves bearing the Wimbledon name, and Wimbledon F.C. shirts. Others have attempted to reclaim the "Franchise F.C." label for their own use, chanting "you're getting beat by a franchise" during matches. Elsewhere in the Milton Keynes fanbase, attempts to create a club culture separate to Wimbledon are visible, largely driven by the Concrete Cows. MK supporters have christened Stadium MK "the Moo Camp", while as early as the first match in Buckinghamshire, mooing was heard in the crowd. The South Stand is known as the Cowshed, a tradition maintained from their National Hockey Stadium days.

Chart of English Football League performance of MK Dons and AFC Wimbledon since the 2004–05 season

In January 2012 the Wimbledon Guardian newspaper launched a campaign called "Drop the Dons", with the aim of persuading MK Dons' owners to remove "Dons" from their club's name. The WISA joined the campaign almost immediately, saying that it believed the use of "Dons" by MK Dons was counter-productive for all parties. The campaign was publicly backed by several former Wimbledon F.C. and AFC Wimbledon figures, both Merton Members of Parliament and all 60 of the borough's councillors. Most MK Dons supporters reacted to the campaign with anger. One MK season-ticket holder interviewed by the Milton Keynes Citizen, a former Wimbledon F.C. fan based in London, suggested that "AFC Wimbledon should drop Wimbledon from their name as they don't play in Wimbledon." The leaders of Merton and Milton Keynes Councils met in Milton Keynes in April 2012 to discuss the campaign, and agreed to differ on the matter of a name change. Later that year, shortly before the first AFC Wimbledon–MK Dons match, Winkelman told reporters that "Dons" would not be dropped from his club's name unless it was the will of MK supporters. "I have learned to do what the supporters want," he said. At that match, MK Dons' supporters unfurled a banner reading "we're keeping the Dons...... just get over it!"

In a December 2012 interview, Winkelman expressed some regret about what had happened. "I'm not proud of the way this club came to exist, and I am totally prepared to be the villain of the piece, but I can't put the genie back in the bottle," he said. "Do I think it was right? No. Do I think it was a great thing that happened to Wimbledon? No ... I don't feel in the right over the way this club was born. But I don't think I could live with myself if I hadn't gone out and bought the club when it was hours away from liquidation. It was about to be completely finito ... What happened was my fault, and I have to take responsibility for it. But I don't see why my players, staff and our young supporter base should be forced to carry the can and live with the nastiness, it's nothing to do with them."

Since the relocation, football magazine When Saturday Comes—which annually publishes a pre-season questionnaire of fans from every League club in England and the top two Scottish divisions—has never invited an MK Dons fan to contribute. The magazine has each year left MK's space empty but for the words "No questions asked".

== Fixtures between AFC Wimbledon and MK Dons ==
The two sides met for the first time on 2 December 2012, in the second round of the 2012–13 FA Cup. MK Dons won 2–1; with an injury time winner scored by Jon Otsemobor with his heel; MK fans dubbed the goal the "Heel of God" (a spoof on the 1986 Argentina–England "Hand of God"). Kyle McFadzean's opening goal for MK Dons in the second match between the two clubs, a 3–1 MK win in the first round of the League Cup in August 2014 was also scored with his heel, and was consequently labelled "Heel of God II". Two months later, in the Football League Trophy Southern section second round, AFC Wimbledon defeated MK Dons 3–2 with a winning goal by Adebayo Akinfenwa.

The two clubs played each other in the same league for the first time during the 2016–17 season, after the 2015–16 campaign ended with MK Dons' relegation to League One and AFC Wimbledon's promotion via the play-offs to the same division. Whenever MK Dons have visited, AFC Wimbledon has not acknowledged the "Dons" part of its opponent's name in match programmes or on the scoreboards, instead referring to the opposition simply as "MK". As a result, the English Football League charged AFC Wimbledon for breaching its regulations.

AFC Wimbledon win Draw MK Dons win

2 December 2012 FA Cup R2	MK Dons	2–1	AFC Wimbledon	Milton Keynes
12:30 GMT (UTC)	Gleeson 45'; Otsemobor 90+2'	Report	Midson 59'	Stadium: Stadium mk Attendance: 16,459; Referee: Scott Mathieson

12 August 2014 League Cup R1	MK Dons	3–1	AFC Wimbledon	Milton Keynes
19:45 BST (UTC+1)	McFadzean 19'; Powell 49'; Afobe 76'	Report	Tubbs 90+4' (pen.)	Stadium: Stadium mk Attendance: 7,174; Referee: Dean Whitestone

7 October 2014 League Trophy R2 South	MK Dons	2–3	AFC Wimbledon	Milton Keynes
19:45 BST (UTC+1)	Powell 2'; Afobe 40'	Report	Azeez 26'; Rigg 68'; Akinfenwa 80'	Stadium: Stadium MK; Attendance: 4,407; Referee: Tim Robinson

10 December 2016 League One	MK Dons	1–0	AFC Wimbledon	Milton Keynes
13:00 GMT (UTC)	Bowditch 63' (pen.)			Stadium: Stadium mk Attendance: 11,185; Referee: Geoff Eltringham

14 March 2017 League One	AFC Wimbledon	2–0	MK Dons	Norbiton, London
19:45 GMT (UTC)	Reeves 62'; Taylor 68'			Stadium: Kingsmeadow; Attendance: 4,112; Referee: Roger East

22 September 2017 League One	AFC Wimbledon	0–2	MK Dons	Norbiton, London
19:45 BST (UTC+1)			Seager 7'; Ariyibi 26'	Stadium: Kingsmeadow; Attendance: 3,973; Referee: Mike Jones

13 January 2018 League One	MK Dons	0–0	AFC Wimbledon	Milton Keynes
15:00 GMT (UTC)				Stadium: Stadium mk Attendance: 9,504; Referee: Paul Tierney

13 August 2019 EFL Cup R1	AFC Wimbledon	2–2 (a.e.t.) (2–4 p)	MK Dons	Norbiton, London
19:45 BST (UTC+1)	Wagstaff 8'; O'Neill 90+4'		McGrandles 16'; Kasumu 50'	Stadium: Kingsmeadow; Attendance: 2,191; Referee: Craig Hicks
	Penalties
	O'Neill (penalty scored); Reilly (penalty missed); Hartigan (penalty scored); Pigott (penalty missed)		(penalty scored) Poole; (penalty scored) Martin; (penalty missed) Cargill; (penalty scored) McGrandles; (penalty scored) Gilbey

7 September 2019 League One	MK Dons	2–1	AFC Wimbledon	Milton Keynes
15:00 GMT (UTC)	Nombe 10'; Healey 26'		Forss 83'	Stadium: Stadium mk Attendance: 8,267; Referee: Ben Toner

18 April 2020 League One	AFC Wimbledon	A–A	MK Dons	Norbiton, London
15:00 BST (UTC+1)		(Note: Abandoned following suspension of League One season due to the COVID-19 pandemic in England)		Stadium: Kingsmeadow

31 October 2020 League One	MK Dons	1–1	AFC Wimbledon	Milton Keynes
15:00 GMT (UTC)	Fraser 13'	Report	Pigott 10'	Stadium: Stadium mk Attendance: 0 (Note: Played behind closed doors due to the COVID-19 pandemic in England); Referee: Chris Sarginson

30 January 2021 League One	AFC Wimbledon	0–2	MK Dons	Wimbledon, London
15:00 GMT (UTC)		Report	O'Riley 60'; Sorinola 62'	Stadium: Plough Lane; Attendance: 0 Referee: Ben Toner

11 January 2022 League One	MK Dons	1–0	AFC Wimbledon	Milton Keynes
19:45 GMT	O'Riley 29'	Report		Stadium: Stadium MK; Attendance: 7,663; Referee: Anthony Backhouse

9 April 2022 League One	AFC Wimbledon	1–1	MK Dons	Wimbledon, London
15:00 BST	Woodyard 19'; Heneghan (yellow card) 36'; Assal (yellow card) 45+1'; Marsh (yellow card) 67'	Report	Harvie (yellow card) 40'; O'Hora (yellow card) 45+1'; Parrott 80'	Stadium: Plough Lane; Attendance: 7,841; Referee: James Oldham

23 January 2024 League Two	MK Dons	3–1	AFC Wimbledon	Milton Keynes
19:45 GMT	Kemp 10'; Johnson 16' (o.g.); O'Hora 22'; Payne (yellow card) 79'	Report	Little 53'; Tilley (yellow card) 56'; Biler (red card) 65'; Kalambayi (red card) 73'	Stadium: Stadium MK; Attendance: 6,278; Referee: Sunny Sukhvir Gill

2 March 2024 League Two	AFC Wimbledon	1–0	MK Dons	Wimbledon, London
12:30 GMT	Little (yellow card) 28'; Kelly (yellow card) 36'; Bugiel (yellow card) 77'; Reeves (yellow card) 85'; O'Toole (yellow card) 90+2'; Curtis 90+4'; Curtis (yellow card) 90+5'	Report	Kelly (yellow card) 4'; Wearne (yellow card) 29'; Harvie (yellow card) 55'; Lofthouse (yellow card) 56'; Gilbey (yellow card) 65'; Norman (yellow card) 87'	Stadium: Plough Lane; Attendance: 8,182

14 September 2024 League Two	AFC Wimbledon	3–0	MK Dons	Wimbledon, London
12:30 GMT	Hippolyte 11'; Maycock 90', 90+7'	Report		Stadium: Plough Lane; Attendance: 7,921; Referee: Darren Drysdale

3 November 2024 FA Cup R1	MK Dons	0–2	AFC Wimbledon	Milton Keynes
12:30 GMT		Report	Stevens 44'; Bugiel 51'	Stadium: Stadium MK; Attendance: 10,419; Referee: Matthew Corlett

25 January 2025 League Two	MK Dons	0–0	AFC Wimbledon	Milton Keynes
12:30 GMT		Report		Stadium: Stadium MK; Attendance: 7,693; Referee: Craig Hicks

17 September 2026 League One	AFC Wimbledon	0–0	MK Dons	Wimbledon
20:00 BST		Report		Stadium: Plough Lane; Attendance: 7,960; Referee: Richard Eley

17 April 2027 League One	MK Dons	v	AFC Wimbledon	Milton Keynes
15:00 BST				Stadium: Stadium MK

=== Summary of results ===
As of 17 September 2026

	MK Dons wins	Draws	AFC Wimbledon wins	MK Dons goals	AFC Wimbledon goals
League	6	5	3	13	10
FA Cup	1	0	1	2	3
Football League Cup	1	1	0	5	3
Football League Trophy	0	0	1	2	3
Total	8	6	5	22	19

== See also ==
- Relocation of professional sports teams

== Notes and references ==
=== Bibliography ===
- Bale, John (1993). Sport, Space and the City. London: Routledge. ISBN 0-415-08098-3.
- Bendixson, Terence; Platt, John (1992). Milton Keynes: Image and Reality. Cambridge: Granta Editions. ISBN 0-906782-72-4.
- Cox, Richard; Russell, Dave; Vamplew, Wray, eds. (September 2002). Encyclopedia of British Football. London: Routledge. ISBN 978-0-7146-5249-8.
- Crabtree, Stephen (April 1996). The Dons in the League 1977–1982. Buckingham: Sporting and Leisure Press. ISBN 0-86023-558-0.
- Hammam, Sam (14 January 2000). The Wimbledon We Have. London: Wimbledon F.C.
- Inglis, Simon (1996) [1985]. Football Grounds of Britain (3rd ed.). London: CollinsWillow. ISBN 0-00-218426-5.
- Llewelyn-Davies, Richard; de Monchaux, John; Bor, Walter (March 1970). The Plan for Milton Keynes. Bletchley: Milton Keynes Development Corporation. ISBN 0-903379-00-7.
- Llewelyn-Davies, Richard; Forestier-Walker, Richard; Bor, Walter (December 1968). Milton Keynes: Interim Report to Milton Keynes Development Corporation. Bletchley: Milton Keynes Development Corporation.
- Morrow, Stephen (2003). The People's Game?: Football, Finance and Society. Basingstoke: Palgrave Macmillan. ISBN 9780230288393.
- Mumford, Stephen (2013). Watching Sport: Aesthetics, Ethics and Emotion. London: Routledge. ISBN 9781136660160.
- Osborn, Frederic J; Whittick, Arnold (1977). New Towns: Their Origins, Achievements, and Progress. London: Leonard Hill. ISBN 9780249441406.
- Parker, Raj; Stride, Steve; Turvey, Alan (28 May 2002). Report of the Independent Commission on Wimbledon F.C.'s wish to relocate to Milton Keynes (PDF). The Football Association. Archived from the original (PDF) on 5 February 2012.
- Ward, Andrew; Williams, John (2010) [2009]. Football Nation: Sixty Years of the Beautiful Game. London: Bloomsbury Publishing. ISBN 978-1-4088-0126-0.
