= Simon Carter =

British fashion design company

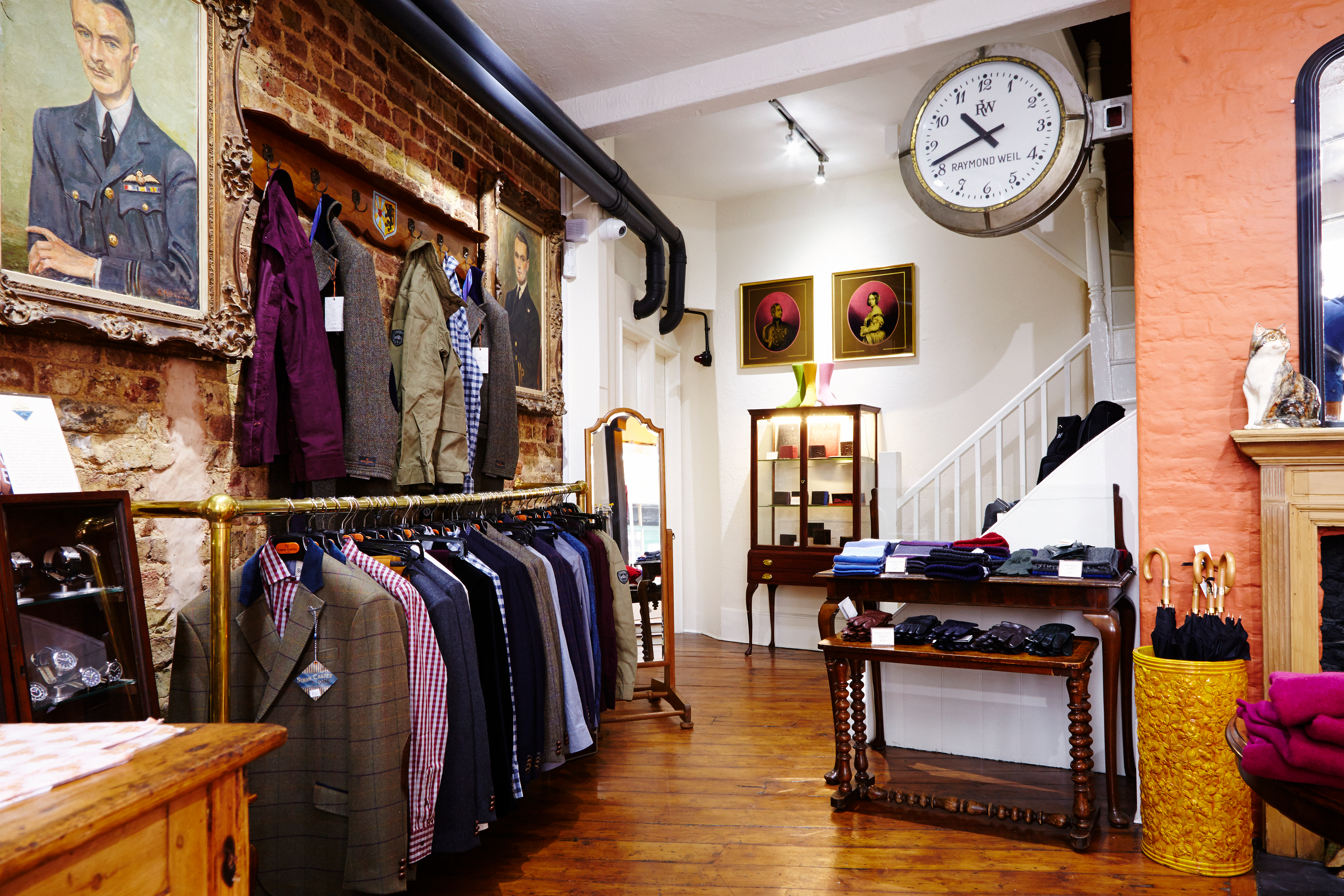
The Simon Carter store in Crystal Palace, London.

Simon Carter Ltd. is a British fashion design company specialising in men's accessories and menswear, founded in London in 1985 by its eponymous director.

Whilst training as an immunologist in the early 1980s Simon Carter became inspired by the vibrant culture of London's King's Road. He had a vintage brooch copied in pewter and, after some time going from premises to premises in the King's Road sold the item to the jeweller's Cobra & Bellamy.

In 1995, Simon Carter was noted for creating the so-called 'Aspirin cufflink', which features a small headache pill sized screwtop container. The design saw Simon Carter dubbed "The King of Cufflinks" by Brighton-based Absolute magazine.

In 2013 Simon Carter Ltd. was awarded Drapers 'Menswear Brand Of the Year'.
