= Construction News =

British business magazine

- Cover of the October 2024 issue
- Editor: Colin Marrs
- Former editors: Lem Bingley
- Categories: Construction, Engineering, Built Environment, Sustainability
- Frequency: Monthly
- Circulation: 7,926 (2015)
- Publisher: Metropolis International
- Founder: Alsager Hay Hill
- Founded: 1871
- First issue: 30 August 1871
- Company: Metropolis International
- Country: United Kingdom
- Based in: Fleet Street, London
- Language: English
- Website: constructionnews.co.uk
- ISSN: 0010-6860
- OCLC: 25395467

Construction News is a monthly publication, plus digital and events services, primarily targeting the United Kingdom construction industry.

== History ==
=== Early history ===
The magazine was first published as Labour News on 30 August 1871, having been founded by Victorian reformer Alsager Hay Hill to try to ease the blight of unemployment by printing information about job vacancies. It became Construction and Labour News on 14 March 1963, and just over a year later (9 April 1964) was first published under its current title.

=== Emap ===
Prior to its acquisition for £7.6m by Emap in August 1995, Construction News and its related media interests was owned by the Thomson Corporation. At that time, the publication had a paid-for circulation of 30,000 and had a 1994 turnover of £4.0m.

At its peak Construction News had a weekly print circulation of 42,000. According to ABC (Audit Bureau of Circulations), the magazine's circulation for the year ending 30 June 2013, was 9,110. In the year to June 2015, this figure was 7,926.

Construction News' website, CNplus, was launched in 2002, and in December 2015 changed its domain name to constructionnews.co.uk.

The title's digital publishing and event activities have gradually expanded. In 1997 CN launched the Quality in Construction Awards, which were renamed the Construction News Awards in 2011. In 2014 it was named Best Awards Event at the annual Conference Awards, judges commenting that "what really comes across is the in-depth knowledge of what suits the market these awards serve".

In 2004 CN extended its events portfolio with the Specialists Awards to recognise specialist contractors and subcontractors.

The Construction News Summit launched in 2013 to provide a forecasting and networking event for the industry, with the first summit featuring former chancellor Alistair Darling and then planning minister Nick Boles.

In March 2012, CN's parent company rebranded as Top Right Group, but retained the Emap name for its magazines operation, which at the time accounted for around 18 percent of the group's turnover.

In October 2015 Top Right Group announced plans to scrap the Emap brand and to stop producing print editions so that, over the next 12–18 months, all titles, including Construction News, would become digital only. However, this plan was subsequently put on hold and Construction News continues to produce print editions.

=== Change of owner ===
In December 2015 Top Right Group rebranded as Ascential who, in January 2017, announced its intention to sell 13 titles including Construction News; the 13 "heritage titles" were to be "hived off into a separate business while buyers are sought." The brands were purchased by Metropolis International Ltd (owner of the Property Week title since 2013) in a £23.5m cash deal, announced on 1 June 2017.

In May 2022, Colin Marrs succeeded Lem Bingley as editor of Construction News. Bingley had succeeded Tom Fitzpatrick in July 2019.

In 2021, its 150th year of publication, the printed magazine switched from weekly to monthly distribution. The final weekly edition was published on 19 March 2021.
