= Belfast United (proposed football club) =

Proposal to relocate a British football club to Northern Ireland

Belfast United is the name of a proposed English Premier League football club during the late 1990s, which was to be created by relocating an existing club from Britain to Belfast in Northern Ireland. The project was discussed by the Government of Tony Blair, and was seen as a way of uniting the community of Northern Ireland following The Troubles.

== Background ==
Following the 1997 election of the Labour Party, and the conclusion of The Troubles, informal discussions took place with a view to relocating an English Premier League football club from the UK mainland to Belfast in Northern Ireland. It was proposed the club would be named Belfast United, and the move was seen as a potential way "to build up strong cross-community support and provide a positive unifying force in a divided city". The idea was favoured by then UK prime minister Tony Blair, who felt it would be a "significant breakthrough if Belfast had a football team playing in the English Premier League". The proposal involved relocating Wimbledon F.C. from London to Belfast, as Wimbledon needed to move from its Plough Lane stadium as a result of the findings of the 1990 Taylor Report commissioned following the Hillsborough disaster, which had recommended clubs should move towards having all-seater stadiums. Plough Lane was also deemed to be unfit for redevelopment, and Wimbledon had been playing home matches at Selhurst Park, home of Crystal Palace, since 1991.

Along with the proposed move came the suggested construction of a £45m mainly private sector funded 40,000-seat sports stadium in Belfast, planned for completion in 1999, as well as a sport academy to be located either on Queen's Island in east Belfast or North Foreshore in North Belfast. It was believed that the proposals would bring new investment to Northern Ireland, as well as giving Belfast an international sporting profile if a team based in the city were seen to be performing well in both English and European football competitions.

In 1998, notes regarding the discussions were leaked to the Belfast Telegraph, which then published an article about the project, claiming that it was supported by Mo Mowlam, the Secretary of State for Northern Ireland, although Mowlam had previously communicated her belief that the idea was not "particularly safe". The same article quoted a note by Alastair Campbell, the Downing Street Chief Press Secretary, which commented on discussions Wimbledon owner Sam Hammam had undertaken with officials at the Football Association of Ireland about possibly moving the club to Dublin, but which "seems to have come to naught". A memo regarding the Belfast proposal, and signed by Blair on 16 July 1998, suggested "we should encourage this as much as possible". However, although Downing Street was in favour of the idea, local football officials in Northern Ireland were concerned the plans could "kill off the game in Northern Ireland", and by August 1998 the project was described as being at a "delicate stage", with Irish football officials continuing "to resist the idea strongly". Moreover, Gerry Loughran, Permanent Secretary to the Department of Economic Development, did not believe the mid-table Wimbledon would be capable of playing in Europe, or that fans would transfer their loyalty to the relocated club.

== Subsequent developments ==
Following resistance to the project, the idea was not mentioned again after 1999, and did not come to fruition. Focus then switched to building a new national football stadium for Northern Ireland. The venue was finally opened at Windsor Park, home of Linfield F.C., in 2016.

Wimbledon F.C. moved from the Plough Lane stadium in 1998 to groundshare fully with Crystal Palace at Selhurst Park, and the Plough Lane stadium was later demolished. Wimbledon was relegated from the Premier League in 2000, and in 2002 were given permission by the Football Association to relocate to Milton Keynes and change their name. The club was renamed MK Dons F.C. in 2004. In 2002, a new club, AFC Wimbledon, was formed by supporters of the original Wimbledon, and began competing in the Combined Counties League Premier Division; the club reached the English Football League in 2011.

In December 2023, UK government papers discussing the project were released to the National Archives by the Public Records Office of Northern Ireland. Commenting on the plans, Jim Boyce, who chaired the Irish Football Association during the 1990s, described it as a "publicity stunt".

== See also ==
- Politics and sports
- Football in the United Kingdom
