= Alsager Hay Hill =

English social reformer

Alsager Hay Hill (1 October 1839 – 2 August 1906) was an English social reformer active during the late 19th century, influential on poor law reform and employment issues. He founded one of the first labour exchanges and, in 1871, a newspaper, Labour News, that is still published today as Construction News.

== Early life ==
Hill was born at Gressenhall Hall in Norfolk, the second son in a family of five sons and six daughters of John David Hay Hill, lord of the manor of Gressenhall, and Margaret (second daughter of the hop merchant and former MP for Cashel, Ebenezer John Collett).

Hill was educated at Brighton College (1850–54) and at Cheltenham College (1854–57). In 1857 he obtained an exhibition at Caius College, Cambridge, migrating as scholar to Trinity Hall, where he graduated LLB in 1862. Becoming a student of the Inner Temple in October 1860, he was called to the bar in January 1864.

== Social reform ==
He joined the south-eastern circuit, but soon devoted his energies to journalism and to literature, interesting himself especially in poor law and labour questions, and working as almoner to the Society for the Relief of Distress in the East of London. In letters to the press during 1868 Hill called attention to weaknesses in the poor laws, and urged a more scientific classification of paupers (The Times, 9 January 1868). His pamphlet on Our Unemployed, prepared for the National Association for the Promotion of Social Science, and published in 1867, was one of the first to call public attention to the problem of unemployment, and to suggest a national system of labour registration.

Other pamphlets followed: Lancashire Labour and the London Poor (1871), Impediments to the Circulation of Labour, with a Few Suggestions for their Removal (1873), The Unemployed in Great Cities, with Suggestions for the Better Organisation of Labourers (1877), and Vagrancy in 1881.

Hill was also a supporter of the role of women in public life, supporting campaigns to elect prominent women such as Maria Grey and Elizabeth Garrett Anderson to the London School Board in 1870, recognising the potential benefits of education on relieving poverty.

Hill was a pioneer of the system of labour exchanges in England, and in 1871 established in Greek Street, Soho, 'The Employment Inquiry Office and Labour Registry,' which was subsequently transferred to 15 Russell Street, Covent Garden, as the 'Central Labour Exchange, Employment, Emigration, and Industrial Intelligence Office.' There as director Hill advised applicants for assistance, and founded and edited Labour News to improve communication between masters and men seeking work. Hill had agents and correspondents in the chief industrial centres, who sent notes on the condition of the local labour markets (Hill's venture, which was not profitable, impaired his health; on his retirement a committee of working men managed the paper, and contributed from the profits to Hill's maintenance). The publication, founded in 1871, survived to become Construction and Labour News (1963) and then, in April 1964, Construction News.

From 1877 onwards Hill also edited The Industrial Handbook and superintended the publication in 1881 of The Industrial Index to London, by H. Llewelyn Williams, as well as Business Aspects of Ladies' Work. He also edited (1870–71) a series of penny Statutes for the People, intended to give the labouring class cheap legal advice (legal aid). He was prominent, from its foundation in 1869, in the work of the Charity Organisation Society, as a 1914 history of the Society made clear:

Mr. Alsager Hay Hill joined the Society in its first year. He was one of its first Hon. Secretaries, and the life and soul of Council meetings in the early days of struggle. A man of rare natural wit, something of a poet, and the brightest of companions, he threw himself eagerly into the Society's work, and more particularly devoted his time and energy to an attempt to deal with the problems of unemployment. His 'Labour News' of thirty years ago anticipated the Labour Exchanges of today.

Hill was honorary secretary of the council until July 1870, and remained an active member of the council until 1880. Hill also supported the Working Men's Club and Institute Union.

== Personal life ==
A published writer of poetry and verse throughout his life, Hill was praised in The Spectator:

For besides writing poetry, Mr. Alsager Hill is a well-known philanthropist, and [when] his experience and his sympathies meet, he produces some telling verses. Of these, "Lilies in the City," "Mrs. Grundy's Sunday," and "The Great God Gin," are good examples. ... Among flowers and books also Mr. Hill can take his ease, and forgets, as his preface tells us, that there are newspapers to edit and philanthropy to organise.

Hill suffered from ill health and poverty in his later years, living in retirement at Boston, Lincolnshire. He died there unmarried on 2 August 1906, and was buried at Gressenhall.
