= Drapers (magazine) =

British business magazine

- Cover of the December 2024 issue
- Publisher: Metropolis International
- Founded: 1887; 139 years ago
- Based in: London, England
- Language: English
- Website: drapersonline.com

Drapers is a British business-to-business magazine and website covering the fashion retail sector. It was founded on 6 August 1887 to cover the women's clothing retail trade, but today spans the whole fashion retail sector, including wider retail issues such as digital transformation, technological advances and the management of supply chains.

Drapers also hosts a series of conferences, events and awards ceremonies throughout the year to recognize the best-performing businesses and to share learnings.

The publication is owned by Metropolis International.

== History ==
Drapers was founded on 6 August 1887. Former editors of the magazine and website have included Freddie Offley, Sally Bain, Josephine Collins, Lauretta Roberts, Jessica Brown, Caroline Nodder, Eric Musgrave and Keely Stocker. The current editor is Kirsty McGregor.

In 1961, Drapers Record was bought along with the Illustrated London News, Men's Wear and Tatler by the Thomson Corporation and formed into the new Thomson Publications business. Thomson sold Drapers Record in 1985, along with the Illustrated London News, Family Circle, Living, and Construction News. From 1988 to 1992, it was known as DR The Fashion Business, but from 1992 it returned to its original name Drapers Record. EMAP acquired the magazine in 1993.

In 2002, Drapers Record merged with sister title Men's Wear, which had been launched in 1902, to become simply Drapers. In November 2006, Emap started making a version of the magazine available digitally every week. The website was relaunched in 2009.

The Drapers website was refreshed and re-launched in 2014. The magazine has undergone regular redesigns over the years, with the most recent in January 2017.

Often referred to as the "fashion industry bible", Drapers has broken many of the biggest stories impacting the sector and has interviewed many of the key players including Tommy Hilfiger, David Reiss, Alex Baldock, Michael Ward, managing director of Harrods, and Topshop managing director Mary Homer.

It was one of 13 titles acquired from Ascential by Metropolis International in a £23.5m cash deal, announced on 1 June 2017.

== Events ==
Celebrating the best in fashion retailing, the Drapers Awards recognise the top performing and most innovative businesses. The Awards attract more than 800 leading fashion business professionals to a black tie gala dinner held annually in November. The Drapers Independents Awards in September highlight and celebrate the best of independent fashion retailing across the UK and Ireland. The Drapers Fashion Forum puts the new business development ideas at the heart of industry leaders’ debate, navigating opportunities that exist within and between brands and retailers, and looking at how these will develop in the future. The Drapers Digital Festival, held for the first time in April 2017, merges the Drapers Digital Forum and Drapers Digital Awards in one venue, on one day. The event brings the fashion digital and ecommerce community together to learn, celebrate, innovate and shape the future. The Drapers Footwear Awards celebrate the best-performing businesses across the footwear sector, with a gala dinner, awards ceremony and evening entertainment.

== See also ==
- Draper
- Worshipful Company of Drapers
