= Steve Stride =

English businessman

Steven M. "Steve" Stride (born c. 1950) is the former Operations Director of Aston Villa Football Club.

== Career ==
Stride joined the office staff at Aston Villa in 1972 and seven years later was appointed football secretary, a post he held for 16 years. He was elected to the board of directors in 1995, and two years later published a book, Stride inside the Villa, chronicling his 25 years with the club. In 2005, he took responsibility for running the club while longtime chairman Doug Ellis recovered from heart bypass surgery. Stride was the only director to remain at the club following American businessman Randy Lerner's 2006 takeover. He eventually resigned, with his resignation being effective from May 2007.

== Wimbledon F.C. relocation ==
Stride was a member of the three-man Football Association-appointed commission which, in 2002, controversially decided that Wimbledon F.C. should be allowed to relocate to Milton Keynes. Stride voted in favour of the move (only Alan Turvey dissented).
