= Cyclist (magazine) =

British road cycling magazine

- Cover of the October 2024 issue
- Editor: Pete Muir
- Frequency: Monthly; Bimonthly (France)
- First issue: November 2012; 13 years ago
- Company: Metropolis International
- Country: United Kingdom
- Based in: London
- Language: English
- Website: cyclist.co.uk
- ISSN: 2050-6538

Cyclist is a British magazine that covers road cycling in the forms of professional racing news together with consumer guides and reviews. The magazine is published by Diamond Publishing, the consumer magazines division of Metropolis International.

== History ==
The Cyclist magazine was founded in 2012, before launching a website in 2015.

Former owner Dennis Publishing was acquired by Future plc (owner of competitors Cycling Weekly and Procycling) in 2021 from Exponent, however the transaction excluded Cyclist and three more Dennis' titles (Expert Reviews, Fortean Times, and Viz). Those titles were retained by Exponent and grouped into Broadleaf Group. Metropolis International acquired Cyclist, Fortean Times, and Viz from Broadleaf Group in December 2021.

== Awards ==
- PPA for Best Specialist Consumer Magazine: 2015, 2016

== See also ==
- Cycling Weekly
- Procycling
- Cycling Plus
