= Metropolis International =

British media company

Metropolis International Group Ltd.
- Type: Private
- Industry: Publishing
- Founded: 1994; 32 years ago
- Headquarters: London, United Kingdom
- Key people: Robert Marr (CEO)
- Number of employees: 300
- Website: www.metropolis.co.uk

Metropolis International Group Limited, established in 1994, is a predominantly UK-based media and technology group that specializes in business, consumer, and travel media including awards, events, websites, business software, and reward and benefit programs. It currently has 300 employees with offices in West London, Croydon, Bolton, Chester, Dublin, Acton and New York City. The company's headquarters are currently located in Acton and West London.

== Business publishing ==
Metropolis publishes several business-focused titles including:

- Architects' Journal – a weekly architectural magazine, first published in London in 1896, purchased by Metropolis International from Ascential in June 2017.
- The Architectural Review is a monthly international architectural magazine published in London since 1896. Like AJ, it was acquired by Metropolis from Ascential in 2017.
- AV magazine – AV magazine was launched in 1972 for the professional audio-visual sector. The AV portfolio includes AV and AV Europe magazines, the AV Powerbook Directory and numerous supplements.
- Building Products – Established in 1976, Building Products is read by professionals working within the specification chain of the UK construction industry. The magazine highlights products and innovations and their application in projects.
- Construction News – Established originally in 1871, the once weekly print publication primarily covered the United Kingdom construction industry. The title was acquired by Metropolis from Ascential in 2017.
- Drapers – Formerly Drapers Record, founded in 1887, Drapers is a business magazine and website covering the fashion retail sector, acquired by Metropolis in June 2017.
- Duty Free News International – Established in 1987, Duty Free News International is a monthly subscription-based news publication for the global travel-retail industry. It offers coverage of industry issues with news, analysis and features.
- Ground Engineering – Established in 1968, Ground Engineering is the official magazine of the British Geotechnical Association and is published monthly. It was acquired from Ascential by Metropolis in June 2017.
- Independent Retail News – Established in 1995, Independent Retail News is a fortnightly magazine for owners of independent convenience stores.
- IEM (previously Industrial Exchange & Mart) – Established in 1975 and focuses on buying and selling of new and used industrial and commercial products and services.
- Irish Medical Times and MIMS Ireland
- The Landscaper – Established in 1998 is a magazine for the landscaping industry's professionals.
- The Local Government Chronicle (LGC) is a British weekly magazine for local government officers launched in 1855 and acquired by Metropolis in June 2017.
- Mortgage Finance Gazette – Established in 1869 as the Building Societies Gazette, Mortgage Finance Gazette has been a publication for the mortgage lending industry for over 140 years.
- Motor Trader – Established in 1904, Motor Trader is for automotive industry professionals. It focuses on the issues behind the headlines presenting analysis about what is impacting dealers, repairers and car manufacturers.
- National Plant Hire Guide – was first published in 1961 and was quickly established as a directory for the UK plant hire industry. This online directory is split into plant hire equipment and service categories.
- New Civil Engineer – First published in May 1972, NCE is the monthly magazine for members of the Institution of Civil Engineers, and was acquired by Metropolis in June 2017.
- Nursing Times is a monthly magazine for nurses in the United Kingdom. Acquired by Metropolis in June 2017.
- Packaging News – Established in 1957 is a source of news and analysis covering business issues, production, design and innovation in the UK packaging supply chain.
- Property Week – Published by UBM plc until September 2013, when it was acquired by Metropolis.
- UK Boarding Schools Guide – Established in 1995 offers aimed marketing for domestic and international recruitment to UK boarding schools.

Subsequent with acquisition of titles from Ascential, Metropolis International placed them into a subsidiary, Emap Publishing Ltd.

== Diamond Publishing Ltd ==
Diamond Publishing Ltd is the consumer publishing arm of the group and produces a number of publications and websites.

- Record Collector is the UK's longest running monthly music magazine; it also produces the sector's 'bible' "The Rare Record Price Guide" which is available in book form and via online subscription.
- Best of British is the UK's leading nostalgia monthly magazine
- Cyclist – British cycling magazine
- Fortean Times – British magazine dedicated to anomalous phenomena
- Viz – British comic magazine

== Travel publishing ==
Since its foundation in 1994, Metropolis International has published For Less Compact Guides. Metropolis have launched these guides for over 35 locations including London, Amsterdam, Madrid, Thailand and a variety of other countries and cities. The maps feature a complete street index accompanied by an underground/metro map on the reverse, now also provided online and as apps.

== Smartsave ==
Smartsave logo

Launched in 2009, Smartsave.com is Metropolis’ self-proclaimed flagship discounts website, specializing in family day trip savings. The site also offers price reductions on restaurants, hotels, theatres, experiences and general shopping with 20% being the standard discount.

Smartsave uses 'discount technology' with electronic terminals being deployed in shops, restaurants and other outlets. Metropolis International also offer Smartsave discounts to consumers through a variety of distribution channels including guide books, street maps, directories and mobile applications. The program currently runs discounts in the UK, United States, France, Germany and the Netherlands.

Some of Smartsave's partners include Ripley's Believe It or Not!, Manchester United Museum, Paradise Wildlife Park, Aquarium of the Bay, Intrepid Sea, Air & Space Museum and more.
