= Irish Medical Times =

Weekly trade newspaper for Irish physicians

- Categories: Trade newspaper
- Frequency: Weekly
- Founder: John O'Connell
- Founded: 1967
- Company: Metropolis International
- Country: Ireland
- Language: English
- Website: www.imt.ie
- ISSN: 0047-147X

The Irish Medical Times is a weekly newspaper for Irish physicians. It was founded in 1967 by John O'Connell, who went on to become the Minister for Health.

The paper contains news, features, clinical articles, interviews and opinion pieces and is regularly cited as a news source in the Irish national media.

Previous editors include Maureen Browne, Aindreas McEntee, Colin Kerr, Terence Cosgrave and Dara Gantly. As of 2021, the editor of Irish Medical Times was Terence Cosgrave – who was re-appointed having previously served as editor from 2007 to 2010.

The paper runs the Irish Healthcare Awards each year in October, the awards ceremony for which takes place in the Shelbourne Hotel in Dublin.

The Irish Medical Times won the Periodical Publishers' Association of Ireland's 'website of the year' award in December 2008.

Reed Business Information sold Irish Medical Times to Metropolis International in 2009.
