= Property Week =

British business magazine

- Cover of 8 November 2024 issue
- Editor: Lem Bingley
- Former editors: Liz Hamson, Mike Phillips
- Categories: Trade magazine
- Frequency: Weekly
- Circulation: 40,000
- First issue: 1994
- Company: Metropolis Business Publishing
- Country: United Kingdom
- Based in: London
- Language: English
- Website: propertyweek.com
- ISSN: 0969-7594

Property Week is a UK business-to-business magazine which reports on the worldwide commercial and residential property market. It reports news, features and analysis and the latest information from the industry - from development opportunities to investment prospects, professional and legal coverage to regional surveys, plus vacancies.

== Profile ==
Property Week was first published in 1994. The magazine is based in London. The former owners of the magazine were Builder Group and CPM Group. It is published by Metropolis Business Publishing – part of Metropolis International – having belonged to United Business Media between 2003 and September 2013. The magazine is currently edited by Lem Bingley. The magazine has a global edition published on a quarterly basis. It attracts an audience of nearly 40,000 across its print and online products. The magazine is based at Davis House in central Croydon.

== Events ==
Property Week hosts a range of events across the country, internationally and online including B2B conferences, award ceremonies and exhibitions in the market.

The awards dinners attract more than 1000 industry leaders to various locations across the country and are compared by personalities such as Michael Parkinson, Stephen Fry and Jonathan Ross

In 2018, Property Week launched its RESI Trailblazers Awards which are announced at its annual RESI Conference.

== Awards ==
2012: Business Website of the Year - Association of Online Publishers Magazine of the year - LSL Property Press.

2011: Digital edition of the year - PPA

2010: Magazine of the year award - IBP

Property Week also won the PPA weekly business magazine of the year in 2009 (and in 2007)
