= 2024–25 AFC Wimbledon season =

23rd season in existence of AFC Wimbledon

AFC Wimbledon
2024–25 season
- Owner: The Dons Trust
- Manager: Johnnie Jackson
- Stadium: Plough Lane
- League Two: 5th (promoted via play-offs)
- FA Cup: Second round
- EFL Cup: Third round
- EFL Trophy: Round of 32
- Top goalscorer: League: Matty Stevens (17); All: Matty Stevens (21)
Home colours	Third colours

The 2024–25 season was the 23rd season in the history of AFC Wimbledon and their third consecutive season in League Two. In addition to the domestic league, the club also participated in the FA Cup, the EFL Cup, and the EFL Trophy.

== Transfers ==
=== In ===
Date	Pos.	Player	From	Fee	Ref.
1 July 2024 (Note: The transfer was announced on 28 May, and would become official on 1 July once his Stockport County contract expired)	LM	Myles Hippolyte (GRN)	Stockport County (ENG)	Free	
1 July 2024 (Note: The transfer was announced on 17 June, and would become official on 1 July once his Solihull Moors contract expired)	DM	Callum Maycock (ENG)	Solihull Moors (ENG)	Free	
1 July 2024 (Note: The transfer was announced on 18 June, and would become official on 1 July once his Mansfield Town contract expired)	CB	John-Joe O'Toole (IRL)	Mansfield Town (ENG)	Free	
1 July 2024 (Note: The transfer was announced on 20 May, and would become official on 1 July once his Forest Green Rovers contract expired)	CF	Matty Stevens (ENG)	Forest Green Rovers (ENG)	Free	
10 July 2024	GK	Lewis Ward (ENG)	Charlton Athletic (ENG)	Free	
15 August 2024	CB	Riley Harbottle (ENG)	Hibernian (SCO)	Undisclosed	
5 December 2024	CM	Romaine Sawyers (SKN)	Cardiff City (WAL)	Free	
10 December 2024	DM	Sam Hutchinson (ENG)	Reading (ENG)	Free	
14 January 2025	AM	Marcus Browne (ENG)	Oxford United (ENG)	Free	
30 January 2025	FW	Osman Foyo (ENG)	Ipswich Town (ENG)	Undisclosed	

=== Out ===
Date	Pos.	Player	To	Fee	Ref.
20 June 2024	CF	Josh Davison (ENG)	Tranmere Rovers (ENG)	Undisclosed	
5 July 2024	LB	Jack Currie (ENG)	Oxford United (ENG)	Undisclosed	
16 September 2024	CF	Justin Clarke (ENG)	Everton (ENG)	Undisclosed	
19 December 2024	GK	Charlie Wilson-Papps (ENG)	Brighton & Hove Albion (ENG)	Undisclosed	
8 January 2025	CM	Romaine Sawyers (SKN)	Bristol Rovers (ENG)	Free	

=== Loaned in ===
Date	Pos.	Player	From	Date until	Ref.
1 July 2024	CM	Alistair Smith (ENG)	Lincoln City (ENG)	End of Season	
11 July 2024	CF	Joe Pigott (ENG)	Leyton Orient (ENG)	End of Season	
16 July 2024	GK	Owen Goodman (ENG)	Crystal Palace (ENG)	End of Season	
29 July 2024	LB	James Furlong (IRL)	Hull City (ENG)	End of Season	

=== Loaned out ===
Date	Pos.	Player	To	Date until	Ref.
1 July 2024 (Note: The loan was announced on 27 June, and would officially commence on July 1)	CB	Will Nightingale (ENG)	Ross County (SCO)	End of Season	
14 August 2024	CM	Kai Jennings (ENG)	Whitehawk (ENG)	1 January 2025	
14 August 2024	CB	Leo Young (ENG)	Hastings United (ENG)	1 January 2025	
3 September 2024	CM	Harry Sidwell (ENG)	Havant & Waterlooville (ENG)	12 January 2025	
6 September 2024	CF	Paris Lock (ENG)	Braintree Town (ENG)	5 October 2024	
27 September 2024	CB	Ethan Sutcliffe (ENG)	Tonbridge Angels (ENG)	End of Season (Note: On 23 January, Sutcliffe's loan at Tonbridge was extended until the end of season)	
8 November 2024	CM	Morgan Williams (WAL)	Dorking Wanderers (ENG)	End of Season (Note: On 29 December, Williams' loan at Dorking was extended until the end of season)	
23 January 2025	CF	Reuben Amissah (ENG)	Marlow (ENG)	End of Season	
4 March 2025	LW	Ryan McLean (ENG)	Yeovil Town (ENG)	End of Season	
7 March 2025	CM	Harry Sidwell (ENG)	Enfield Town (ENG)	27 April 2025	

=== Released / Out of Contract ===
Date	Pos.	Player	Subsequent club	Join date	Ref.
30 June 2024	LW	Ronan Curtis (IRL)	Port Vale (ENG)	1 July 2024	
30 June 2024	CB	Paul Kalambayi (ENG)	Dagenham & Redbridge (ENG)	1 July 2024	
30 June 2024	CM	Armani Little (ENG)	Gillingham (ENG)	1 July 2024	
30 June 2024	RB	Ben Mason (ENG)	Farnborough (ENG)	1 July 2024	
30 June 2024	CM	Harry Pell (ENG)	Cheltenham Town (ENG)	1 July 2024	
30 June 2024	CF	Zach Robinson (ENG)	Motherwell (SCO)	1 July 2024	
30 June 2024	GK	Nik Tzanev (NZL)	Northampton Town (ENG)	3 July 2024	
30 June 2024	LB	Josh Hallard (ENG)	Aveley (ENG)	7 July 2024	
30 June 2024	CB	Alex Pearce (IRL)	Bracknell Town (ENG)	13 August 2024	
30 June 2024	AM	Marcel Campbell (ENG)	East Grinstead Town (ENG)	27 August 2024	
30 June 2024	CF	Quaine Bartley (ENG)	Maldom & Tiptree (ENG)	6 November 2024	
30 June 2024	LB	Lee Brown (ENG)			
6 January 2025	CM	Romaine Sawyers (SKN)	Bristol Rovers (ENG)	8 January 2025	

== Pre-season and friendlies ==
On 7 May, The Dons announced they would return to Alicante for a five-day warm weather training camp. A month later, four pre-season friendlies were confirmed, against Charlton Athletic, Maidenhead United, Metropolitan Police and Barnet. On June 21, a home friendly fixture against Brentford was added. Peterborough United were confirmed as the opponents for the training camp.

Win Draw Loss Fixtures

12 July 2024 Friendly	AFC Wimbledon	1–0	Peterborough United	La Nucia, Spain
19:00 CEST (18:00 BST)	Smith	Report		Stadium: Estadi Olímpic Camilo Cano

17 July 2024 Friendly	Metropolitan Police	0–3	AFC Wimbledon	Molesey
19:15 BST		Report	Ball; Kelly; Williams	Stadium: Imber Court

20 July 2024 Friendly	AFC Wimbledon	2–5	Brentford	Wimbledon
13:00 BST	Lewis 3'; Stevens	Report	Thiago 23' (?); Wissa (pen.); Schade 56'; Mbeumo 75'	Stadium: Plough Lane; Attendance: 3,458

27 July 2024 Friendly	AFC Wimbledon	2–0	Charlton Athletic	Wimbledon
15:00 BST	Johnson 63'; Kelly 73'	Report		Stadium: Plough Lane; Attendance: 3,156

30 July 2024 Friendly	Maidenhead United	2–1	AFC Wimbledon	Maidenhead
19:30 BST	Dyce 6'; McCoulsky 70'	Report	Smith 75'	Stadium: York Road

3 August 2024 Friendly	Barnet	2–0	AFC Wimbledon	Edgware
15:00 BST	Kabamba (pen.); Oluwo	Report		Stadium: The Hive Stadium

== Competitions ==
=== League Two ===
==== League table ====
Pos	Team	Pld	W	D	L	GF	GA	GD	Pts	Promotion, qualification or relegation
3	Bradford City (P)	46	22	12	12	64	45	+19	78	Promotion to EFL League One
4	Walsall	46	21	14	11	75	54	+21	77	Qualification for League Two play-offs
5	AFC Wimbledon (O, P)	46	20	13	13	56	35	+21	73	Qualification for League Two play-offs
6	Notts County	46	20	12	14	68	49	+19	72	Qualification for League Two play-offs
7	Chesterfield	46	19	13	14	73	54	+19	70	Qualification for League Two play-offs

Source: EFL Official Website
Rules for classification: 1) Points; 2) Goal difference; 3) Number of goals scored; 4) Head-to-head results; 5) Wins; 6) Away goals; 7) Penalty points (sec 9.5); 8) 12-point sending off offences
(O) Play-off winners; (P) Promoted

==== Results summary ====
Overall								Home						Away					
Pld	W	D	L	GF	GA	GD	Pts	W	D	L	GF	GA	GD	W	D	L	GF	GA	GD
46	20	13	13	56	35	+21	73	13	5	5	35	16	+19	7	8	8	21	19	+2

Last updated: complete.
Source: Soccerway

==== Results by round ====
Round	1	2	3	4	6	7	10	11	12	13	14	15	16	8^{2}	17	5^{1}	18	19	20	21	22	23	24	27	28	29	30	31	9^{3}	32	25^{4}	33	34	35	36	26^{5}	37	38	39	40	41	42	43	44	45	46
Ground	H	A	A	H	H	A	A	H	A	H	A	H	A	H	H	A	H	A	H	A	H	H	A	H	A	A	H	A	H	H	A	A	H	A	H	H	A	H	A	A	H	A	H	A	H	A
Result	W	L	W	W	W	D	L	W	L	W	L	L	W	D	L	W	D	W	W	L	D	W	W	W	D	D	W	D	W	W	D	D	L	L	W	L	W	D	D	L	W	D	D	L	L	W
Position	3	11	8	6	4	5	13	8	11	10	12	14	10	8	9	7	8	6	4	6	5	2	2	2	5	6	4	5	4	2	2	3	5	5	4	5	3	3	5	6	5	5	5	5	6	5
Points	3	3	6	9	12	13	13	16	16	19	19	19	22	23	23	26	27	30	33	33	34	37	40	43	44	45	48	49	52	55	56	57	57	57	60	60	63	64	65	65	68	69	70	70	70	73

Source: EFL
A = Away; H = Home; W = Win; D = Draw; L = Loss; P = Postponed
Notes:
- ^{1} Matchday 5 (vs. Tranmere Rovers) was postponed due to international call-ups
- ^{2} Matchday 8 (vs. Accrington Stanley) was postponed due to a damaged pitch at Plough Lane
- ^{3} Matchday 9 (vs. Crewe Alexandra) was postponed due to rearranged EFL Cup fixtures
- ^{4} Matchday 25 (vs. Fleetwood Town) was postponed due to heavy snowfall
- ^{5} Matchday 26 (vs. Cheltenham Town) was postponed due to a frozen pitch

==== Matches ====
On 26 June, the League Two fixtures were announced.

Win Draw Loss Fixtures

10 August 2024 1	AFC Wimbledon	4–2	Colchester United	Wimbledon
15:00 BST	Ball 13', (yellow card) 82'; Reeves 30', (yellow card) 66'; Lewis (yellow card) 35'; Stevens 38' (pen.); Bugiel 54'; Goodman (yellow card) 90+1'; Johnson (yellow card) 90+7'	Report	Goodliffe 1', 9'; Hunt (yellow card) 40'	Stadium: Plough Lane; Attendance: 7,924; Referee: Daniel Middleton

17 August 2024 2	Bromley	2–0	AFC Wimbledon	Bromley
12:30 BST	Cheek 35'; Charles (yellow card) 56'; Whitely 60'	Report	Ball (yellow card) 37'; Neufville (yellow card) 90+1'; Smith (yellow card) 90+4'	Stadium: Hayes Lane; Attendance: 4,102; Referee: Will Finnie
Note: Fixture was initially scheduled for a 15:00 kick-off, but was moved for live Sky Sports broadcast.

24 August 2024 3	Cheltenham Town	0–1	AFC Wimbledon	Cheltenham
15:00 BST	Bennett (yellow card) 28'	Report	Pigott 67'; Reeves (yellow card) 90+3'	Stadium: Whaddon Road; Attendance: 4,256; Referee: Stephen Parkinson

31 August 2024 4	AFC Wimbledon	1–0	Fleetwood Town	Wimbledon
15:00 BST	Neufville 28'; Harbottle (yellow card) 47'; Lewis (yellow card) 48'; Bugiel (yellow card) 90+1'	Report	Broom (yellow card) 70'; Hunt (yellow card) 73'	Stadium: Plough Lane; Attendance: 7,162; Referee: James Durkin

14 September 2024 6	AFC Wimbledon	3–0	Milton Keynes Dons	Wimbledon
12:30 BST	Hippolyte 11'; Maycock 90', 90+7'	Report		Stadium: Plough Lane; Attendance: 7,921; Referee: Darren Drysdale
Note: Fixture was initially scheduled for a 15:00 kick-off, but was moved for live Sky Sports broadcast.

21 September 2024 7	Bradford City	0–0	AFC Wimbledon	Bradford
15:00 BST	Wright (yellow card) 80'; Smallwood (yellow card) 90+2'; Cook (yellow card) 90+3'	Report	Hippolyte (yellow card) 90+2'; Lewis (yellow card) 90+3'	Stadium: Valley Parade; Attendance: 16,344; Referee: Andy Davies

5 October 2024 10	Salford City	1–0	AFC Wimbledon	Salford
15:00 BST	Garbutt (yellow card) 48'; N'Mai (yellow card) 51'; Ashley (yellow card) 71'; Kouassi (yellow card) 80'; Luamba 84'	Report	Neufville (yellow card) 12'; Harbottle (yellow card) 39'; Hippolyte (yellow card) 51'; Furlong (yellow card) 62'	Stadium: Moor Lane; Attendance: 2,627; Referee: Scott Simpson

12 October 2024 11	AFC Wimbledon	4–0	Carlisle United	Wimbledon
15:00 BST	Maycock (yellow card) 6'; Stevens 8', 39', 50'; Harper 45+3' (o.g.); Harbottle (yellow card) 56'	Report	Barclay (yellow card) 34'; Vela (yellow card) 60'	Stadium: Plough Lane; Attendance: 8,331; Referee: Neil Hair

19 October 2024 12	Notts County	1–0	AFC Wimbledon	Nottingham
15:00 BST	Macari (yellow card) 13'; Platt (yellow card) 64', (goal) 67'; Abbott (yellow card) 90+1'	Report	Harbottle (yellow card) 9'; Furlong (yellow card) 90'	Stadium: Meadow Lane; Attendance: 10,156; Referee: Geoff Eltringham

22 October 2024 13	AFC Wimbledon	3–0	Morecambe	Wimbledon
19:45 BST	Tilley 52'; Smith (yellow card) 54'; Bugiel 66'; Stevens 70'	Report	Hendrie (yellow card) 77'	Stadium: Plough Lane; Attendance: 7,651; Referee: Matthew Russell

26 October 2024 14	Port Vale	3–2	AFC Wimbledon	Stoke-on-Trent
15:00 BST	Cover 9'; Richards 11'; Debrah (yellow card) 19'; Stockley 62', (yellow card) 64'; Lowe (yellow card) 75'; Baker-Boaitey (yellow card) 87'; Ripley (yellow card) 90+2'	Report	Lewis (yellow card) 11'; Neufville 61'; Hippolyte 78'	Stadium: Vale Park; Attendance: 7,163; Referee: Aaron Bannister

9 November 2024 15	AFC Wimbledon	0–1	Grimsby Town	Wimbledon
15:00 GMT	Johnson (yellow card) 50'; Smith (yellow card) 77'	Report	Rose 30'; McEachran (yellow card) 42'; Hume (yellow card) 45+1'; Wright (yellow card) 54'	Stadium: Plough Lane; Attendance: 8,307; Referee: Thomas Parsons

16 November 2024 16	Barrow	1–3	AFC Wimbledon	Barrow-in-Furness
15:00 GMT	Kirk (yellow card) 32'; Dallas 44'; Eccleston (yellow card) 52'	Report	Pigott 2', (yellow card) 27'; Ball (yellow card) 63'; Stevens 76', 77'; Goodman (yellow card) 79'; Lewis (yellow card) 90+3'	Stadium: Holker Street; Attendance: 3,227; Referee: Ross Joyce

19 November 2024 8	AFC Wimbledon	2–2	Accrington Stanley	Wimbledon
19:45 GMT	Stevens (yellow card) 37'; Tilley (yellow card) 60', (goal) 90+7'; Ball (yellow card) 70'; Smith 89'; Neufville (yellow card) 90+4'	Report	Woods (yellow card) 22'; Rawson (yellow card) 45+1', (red card) 90+9'; Khumbeni 58'; Costelloe 75'; Walton (yellow card) 88'; Hunter (yellow card) 90+9'	Stadium: Plough Lane; Attendance: 7,020; Referee: Ben Atkinson
Note: Fixture was originally scheduled for 28 September, but was postponed due to a damaged pitch at Plough Lane and no suitable alternative venue being found.

23 November 2024 17	AFC Wimbledon	0–1	Walsall	Wimbledon
15:00 GMT	Smith (yellow card) 76'; Bugiel (yellow card) 90+3'	Report	Matt (yellow card) 13'; Daniels (yellow card) 49'; Lowe 52'; Simkin (yellow card) 65'; Comley (yellow card) 89'; Stirk (yellow card) 90+3'	Stadium: Plough Lane; Attendance: 7,519; Referee: James Durkin

26 November 2024 5	Tranmere Rovers	0–2	AFC Wimbledon	Birkenhead
19:45 GMT	Hawkes (yellow card) 49'; Finley (yellow card) 55'; Davies (yellow card) 73'	Report	Stevens 37'; Bugiel (yellow card) 45+2', (goal) 53'	Stadium: Prenton Park; Attendance: 5,007; Referee: Ollie Yates
Note: Fixture was originally scheduled for 7 September, but was postponed due to international call-ups.

3 December 2024 18	AFC Wimbledon	2–2	Newport County	Wimbledon
15:00 GMT	Smith 12'; Stevens 20'; Bugiel (yellow card) 45+1'; O'Toole (yellow card) 51'; Neufville (yellow card) 75'	Report	Spellman 26'; McLoughlin 90+7' (pen.)	Stadium: Plough Lane; Attendance: 6,519; Referee: Lee Swabey

7 December 2024 19	Harrogate Town	0–3	AFC Wimbledon	Harrogate
15:00 GMT	O'Connor (yellow card) 22'; Daly (yellow card) 61'	Report	Kelly 12', (yellow card) 73'; O'Toole 23'; Stevens 50'	Stadium: Wetherby Road; Attendance: 2,506; Referee: Jacob Miles

14 December 2024 20	AFC Wimbledon	1–0	Doncaster Rovers	Wimbledon
15:00 GMT	Stevens 27'	Report		Stadium: Plough Lane; Attendance: 7,862; Referee: David Rock

21 December 2024 21	Chesterfield	1–0	AFC Wimbledon	Chesterfield
15:00 GMT	Dobra 3'; Banks (yellow card) 77'; Horton (yellow card) 90+3'	Report	Hutchinson (yellow card) 18'; O'Toole (yellow card) 69'	Stadium: SMH Group Stadium; Attendance: 8,555; Referee: Aaron Bannister

26 December 2024 22	AFC Wimbledon	1–1	Swindon Town	Wimbledon
15:00 GMT	Tilley 56'	Report	Smith 10'; Wright (yellow card) 88'; Delaney (yellow card) 90+3'	Stadium: Plough Lane; Attendance: 8,304; Referee: Abigail Byrne

30 December 2024 23	AFC Wimbledon	1–0	Gillingham	Wimbledon
20:00 GMT	Stevens 50', (yellow card) 56'; Ogundere (yellow card) 83'	Report	Gale (yellow card) 56'; Little (yellow card) 74'; Dack (yellow card) 77'	Stadium: Plough Lane; Attendance: 8,281; Referee: Sam Purkiss
Note: Fixture was initially scheduled for 29 December, but was moved for live Sky Sports broadcast.

2 January 2025 24	Newport County	1–2	AFC Wimbledon	Newport
19:45 GMT	Greaves 90+2'	Report	Harbottle (yellow card) 41'; Kelly 49', (yellow card) 55'; Tilley (yellow card) 53'; Sawyers 77'	Stadium: Rodney Parade; Attendance: 4,405; Referee: Will Finnie
Note: Fixture was initially scheduled for 1 January, but was moved due to Newport playing the Sunday prior.

18 January 2025 27	AFC Wimbledon	2–0	Tranmere Rovers	Wimbledon
15:00 GMT	Neufville 48'; Stevens 81' (pen.)	Report	Khan (yellow card) 35'; Drysdale (yellow card) 59' (yellow-red card) 87'	Stadium: Plough Lane; Attendance: 7,975; Referee: Scott Simpson

25 January 2025 28	Milton Keynes Dons	0–0	AFC Wimbledon	Milton Keynes
12:30 GMT	Williams (yellow card) 26'	Report	Smith (yellow card) 75'; Browne (yellow card) 79'	Stadium: Stadium MK; Attendance: 7,693; Referee: Craig Hicks
Note: Fixture was initially scheduled for a 15:00 kick-off, but was moved following a policing request.

28 January 2025 29	Crewe Alexandra	1–1	AFC Wimbledon	Crewe
15:00 GMT	Knight-Lebel 14'; Holíček (yellow card) 74'	Report	Neufville 45+1'	Stadium: Gresty Road; Attendance: 4,039; Referee: Lewis Smith

1 February 2025 30	AFC Wimbledon	1–0	Bradford City	Wimbledon
15:00 GMT	Tilley 13'; Johnson (yellow card) 42'; Lewis (yellow card) 70'; Smith (yellow card) 83'	Report	Richards (yellow card) 31'	Stadium: Plough Lane; Attendance: 8,536; Referee: Simon Mather

8 February 2025 31	Accrington Stanley	0–0	AFC Wimbledon	Accrington
15:00 GMT	Matthews (yellow card) 79'	Report	Lewis (yellow card) 17'; Kelly (yellow card) 19'; Bugiel (yellow card) 85'	Stadium: Crown Ground; Attendance: 2,170; Referee: Scott Oldham

11 February 2025 9	AFC Wimbledon	3–0	Crewe Alexandra	Wimbledon
19:45 GMT	Stevens 41' (pen.), 56'; Reeves 45+2'	Report	Lowery (yellow card) 5'; Williams (yellow card) 21'; Knigh-Lebel (red card) 39'; Conway (yellow card) 71'; Powell (yellow card) 77'	Stadium: Plough Lane; Attendance: 7,662; Referee: Andrew Humphries
Note: Fixture was originally scheduled for 1 October, but was postponed due to the rearranged EFL Cup clash versus Newcastle United.

15 February 2025 32	AFC Wimbledon	1–0	Salford City	Wimbledon
12:30 GMT	Smith (yellow card) 11'; Stevens 65'; Bugiel (yellow card) 70'; Browne (yellow card) 77'; Kelly (yellow card) 90+5'	Report	Fornah (yellow card) 24'; Garbutt (yellow card) 72'; Taylor (yellow card) 83'	Stadium: Plough Lane; Attendance: 7,739; Referee: Alan Young
Note: Fixture was initially scheduled to kick-off at 15:00, but was moved for live Sky Sports broadcasting.

18 February 2025 25	Fleetwood Town	0–0	AFC Wimbledon	Fleetwood
19:45 GMT		Report		Stadium: Highbury Stadium
Note: Fixture was initially scheduled for 1 January, but was moved due to Newport playing the Thursday prior. The match was then postponed on that date due to heavy snowfall.

22 February 2025 33	Colchester United	1–1	AFC Wimbledon	Colchester
15:00 GMT	Taylor (yellow card) 6'; Edwards (yellow card) 25'; Iandolo (yellow card) 75'; Tovide 89'	Report	Browne (yellow card) 21' (goal) 39'; Ogundere (yellow card) 60'; Tilley (yellow card) 65'; Johnson (yellow card) 67'; Lewis (yellow card) 77'; Goodman (yellow card) 83'	Stadium: Colchester Community Stadium; Attendance: 6,029; Referee: Richard Eley

1 March 2025 34	AFC Wimbledon	0–1	Bromley	Wimbledon
15:00 GMT	Smith (yellow card) 32'	Report	Arthurs (yellow card) 60'; Whitely 76'; Smith (yellow card) 86'	Stadium: Plough Lane; Attendance: 8,519; Referee: Darren Drysdale

4 March 2025 35	Morecambe	1–0	AFC Wimbledon	Morecambe
19:45 GMT	Angol 20'; Lewis (yellow card) 86'	Report	Hutchinson (yellow card) 14'; Tilley (yellow card) 90+7'	Stadium: Mazuma Mobile Stadium; Attendance: 2,488; Referee: Adam Herczeg

8 March 2025 36	AFC Wimbledon	2–0	Notts County	Wimbledon
12:30 GMT	Smith 21'; Lewis 35'; Bugiel (yellow card) 76'	Report	Palmer (yellow card) 90'	Stadium: Plough Lane; Attendance: 8,659; Referee: Thomas Kirk
Note: Fixture was initially scheduled to kick-off at 15:00, but was moved for live Sky Sports broadcasting.

11 March 2025 26	AFC Wimbledon	1–2	Cheltenham Town	Wimbledon
19:45 GMT	Lewis (yellow card) 22'; Browne 37'	Report	Hay 24'; Taylor 79'	Stadium: Plough Lane; Attendance: 8,114; Referee: Scott Jackson
Note: Fixture was originally scheduled for 11 January, but was postponed due to a frozen pitch.

15 March 2025 37	Carlisle United	1–2	AFC Wimbledon	Carlisle
11:00 GMT	Dennis 67'; Lavelle (yellow card) 90+1'	Report	Maycock 2'; Furlong (yellow card) 15'; Smith 49'; Hutchinson (yellow card) 87'	Stadium: Brunton Park; Attendance: 7,050; Referee: Martin Woods

22 March 2025 38	AFC Wimbledon	2–2	Barrow	Wimbledon
15:00 GMT	Browne 60'; Stevens 85'; Johnson (yellow card) 90+1'; Kelly (yellow card) 90+3'	Report	Campbell 88'; Mahoney 90+6'	Stadium: Plough Lane; Attendance: 8,657; Referee: Ruebyn Ricardo

29 March 2025 39	Walsall	1–1	AFC Wimbledon	Walsall
11:00 GMT	Matt (yellow card) 26'; Allen 87'	Report	Reeves (yellow card) 41'; Chaaban 70'; Ogundere (yellow card) 88'; Sasu (yellow card) 90+1'	Stadium: Bescot Stadium; Attendance: 9,203; Referee: Matthew Corlett

1 April 2025 40	Swindon Town	2–1	AFC Wimbledon	Swindon
14:45 GMT	Tshimanga 90' (pen.), 90+5' (pen.); Smith (penalty missed) 90+3'	Report	Lewis (yellow card) 6'; O'Toole (yellow card) 45' (yellow-red card) 90+3'; Browne 56'; Smith (yellow card) 63'; Reeves (yellow card) 90+3'	Stadium: County Ground; Attendance: 6,500; Referee: James Durkin

5 April 2025 41	AFC Wimbledon	1–0	Harrogate Town	Wimbledon
10:00 GMT	Smith 77'	Report	Muldoon (yellow card) 42'	Stadium: Plough Lane; Attendance: 8,341; Referee: Thomas Parsons

12 April 2025 42	Doncaster Rovers	1–1	AFC Wimbledon	Doncaster
12:30 GMT	Sharp (red card) 72'; Sterry 79'	Report	Smith 5'; Harbottle (yellow card) 22'; Reeves (red card) 28'; Tilley (yellow card) 40'	Stadium: Eco-Power Stadium; Attendance: 8,733; Referee: Neil Hair
Note: Fixture was initially scheduled to kick-off at 15:00, but was moved for live Sky Sports broadcasting.

18 April 2025 43	AFC Wimbledon	0–0	Chesterfield	Wimbledon
10:00 GMT	Johnson (yellow card) 31'; Kelly (yellow card) 45+2'; Tilley (yellow card) 67'; Neufville (yellow card) 87'	Report	Mandeville (yellow card) 90+3'	Stadium: Plough Lane; Attendance: 8,506; Referee: Carl Brook

21 April 2025 44	Gillingham	1–0	AFC Wimbledon	Gillingham
10:00 GMT	Gbode 64'; Rowe (yellow card) 81'; Clarke (yellow card) 86'; Hutton (yellow card) 90+2'	Report	Foyo (yellow card) 44'; Hutchinson (yellow card) 83'	Stadium: Priestfield Stadium; Attendance: 7,641; Referee: Gavin Ward

26 April 2025 45	AFC Wimbledon	0−2	Port Vale	Wimbledon
12:30 BST	Chaaban (yellow card) 45+3'; Hutchinson (yellow card) 58'; Lewis (yellow card) 67'	Report	Stockley 64'; Headley 67'	Stadium: Plough Lane; Attendance: 8,664; Referee: Declan Bourne
Note: Fixture was initially scheduled to kick-off at 15:00, but was moved for live Sky Sports broadcasting.

3 May 2025 46	Grimsby Town	0–1	AFC Wimbledon	Cleethorpes
10:00 GMT		Report	Johnson (yellow card) 30'; Browne (yellow card) 42'; Hutchinson (yellow card) 50'; Hutchinson 52'	Stadium: Blundell Park; Attendance: 8,369; Referee: Ross Joyce

==== Play-offs ====
AFC Wimbledon finished 5th in the regular season and were drawn against 6th place Notts County, first leg away and then at home in the second leg.

10 May 2025 1st Leg	Notts County	0–1	AFC Wimbledon	Nottingham
20:00 BST	Macari (yellow card) 65'; Jatta (red card) 90+5'; Jones (yellow card) 90+5'	Report	Hippolyte (yellow card) 43'; Harbottle 59'; Neufville (yellow card) 64'; Tilley (yellow card) 76'; Bugiel (yellow card) 84'	Stadium: Meadow Lane; Attendance: 12,385; Referee: Thomas Kirk

16 May 2025 2nd Leg	AFC Wimbledon	1–0 (2–0 agg.)	Notts County	Wimbledon
20:00 BST	Neufville 8'; Harbottle (yellow card) 32'; Johnson (yellow card) 78'	Report	Macari (yellow card) 25'; Robertson (yellow card) 72'; Platt (yellow card) 90'	Stadium: Plough Lane; Attendance: 8,501; Referee: Lewis Smith

26 May 2025 Final	AFC Wimbledon	1–0	Walsall	Wembley
15:01 BST	Hippolyte 45+2'	Report		Stadium: Wembley Stadium; Attendance: 50,947; Referee: Will Finnie

=== FA Cup ===
AFC Wimbledon were drawn away to Milton Keynes Dons in the first round and at home to Dagenham & Redbridge in the second round.

Win Draw Loss Fixtures

3 November 2024 First round	Milton Keynes Dons	0–2	AFC Wimbledon	Milton Keynes
12:30 GMT	Hogan (yellow card) 30'; Lemonheigh-Evans (yellow card) 38' (yellow-red card) 71'; Thompson-Sommers (yellow card) 57'; Harrison (yellow card) 90+2'; Gilbey (yellow card) 90+5'	Report	Neufville (yellow card) 12'; Stevens 44', (yellow card) 73'; Bugiel 51'; Hippolyte (yellow card) 67'; Lewis (yellow card) 90+1'	Stadium: Stadium MK; Attendance: 10,419; Referee: Matt Corlett

30 November 2024 Second round	AFC Wimbledon	1–2	Dagenham & Redbridge	Wimbledon
19:15 GMT	Harbottle (yellow card) 37'; Stevens 45+8'; Bugiel (yellow card) 89'; Tilley (yellow card) 90+2'	Report	Morias 35'; Rees 79', (yellow card) 79'; Justham (yellow card) 84'; Woodhouse (yellow card) 88'; Umerah (yellow card) 90+2'; Rutherford (yellow card) 90+6'	Stadium: Plough Lane; Attendance: 5,907; Referee: Craig Hicks

=== EFL Cup ===
On 27 June, the draw for the first round was made, with Wimbledon being drawn away against Bromley. In the second round, they were drawn at home to Ipswich Town. In the third round, a home tie against Newcastle United was confirmed.

Win Draw Loss Fixtures

13 August 2024 First round	Bromley	1–2	AFC Wimbledon	Bromley
19:45 BST	Amantchi 19'	Report	Kelly 24'; Reeves (yellow card) 58'; Pigott 61'; Hippolyte (yellow card) 62'; Johnson (yellow card) 83'; Maycock (yellow card) 89'	Stadium: Hayes Lane; Attendance: 3,677; Referee: Carl Brook

28 August 2024 Second round	AFC Wimbledon	2–2 (4–2 p)	Ipswich Town	Wimbledon
19:45 BST	Bugiel 40'; Stevens 56'; Lewis (yellow card) 61'; Johnson (yellow card) 73'	Report	Al-Hamadi 3'; Burgess (yellow card) 81'; Chaplin 86'; Delap (yellow card) 90+4'	Stadium: Plough Lane; Attendance: 7,934; Referee: James Linington
	Penalties
	Pigott (penalty scored); Stevens (penalty scored); Reeves (penalty missed); Biler (penalty scored); Ogundere (penalty scored)		(penalty scored) Delap; (penalty scored) Burgess; (penalty missed) Taylor; (penalty missed) Hutchinson

1 October 2024 Third round	Newcastle United	1–0	AFC Wimbledon	Newcastle upon Tyne
19:45 BST	Schär 45+1' (pen.); Longstaff (yellow card) 55'	Report	Biler (yellow card) 45'; Hippolyte (yellow card) 52'	Stadium: St James' Park; Attendance: 51,739; Referee: Darren Bond
Note: Fixture was initially scheduled to be hosted by Wimbledon on 24 September, but was postponed and switched to Newcastle due to flooding at Wimbledon's stadium.

=== EFL Trophy ===
==== Group stage ====
In the group stage, Wimbledon were drawn into Southern Group B alongside Crawley Town, Wycombe Wanderers and Brighton & Hove Albion U21. In the round of 32, Wimbledon were drawn away to Colchester United.

Pos	Div	Team	Pld	W	PW	PL	L	GF	GA	GD	Pts	Qualification
1	L1	Wycombe Wanderers	3	2	0	0	1	7	5	+2	6	Advance to Round 2
2	L2	AFC Wimbledon	3	2	0	0	1	5	6	−1	6	Advance to Round 2
3	ACA	Brighton & Hove Albion U21	3	1	0	1	1	8	7	+1	4	
4	L1	Crawley Town	3	0	1	0	2	6	8	−2	2	

Source: EFL

Win Draw Loss Fixtures

20 August 2024 1	AFC Wimbledon	1–0	Wycombe Wanderers	Wimbledon
19:45 BST	Bugiel 84'; Sutcliffe (yellow card) 90+3'	Report		Stadium: Plough Lane; Attendance: 1,542; Referee: Scott Tallis

8 October 2024 2	Crawley Town	3–4	AFC Wimbledon	Crawley
19:45 BST	Darcy 71' (pen.); Hepburn-Murphy 80'; Flint 87'	Report	Ball (yellow card) 18'; Maycock 44'; Stevens 55', (yellow card) 67'; Tilley 57'; Pigott 90+6'	Stadium: Broadfield Stadium; Attendance: 1,438; Referee: Alan Young

29 October 2024 3	AFC Wimbledon	0–3	Brighton & Hove Albion U21	Wimbledon
19:45 BST	Tilley (yellow card) 69'	Report	Knight (yellow card) 5'; Ifill (yellow card) 49'; Vickers 56'; Peupion 69'; Moulton 85'	Stadium: Plough Lane; Attendance: 1,066; Referee: Sam Mulhall

==== Knockout stages ====
10 December 2024 Round of 32	Colchester United	2–0	AFC Wimbledon	Colchester
19:45 GMT	Taylor 6', 33'; Macey (yellow card) 90+3'	Report	Harbottle (yellow card) 40'; Bugiel (yellow card) 78'	Stadium: Colchester Community Stadium; Attendance: 1,139; Referee: Oliver Mackey

== Statistics ==
=== Appearances and goals ===
As of match played 17 May 2025

Players with no appearances are not included on the list
Italics indicate a loaned in player

No.	Pos	Nat	Player	Total		League Two		FA Cup		EFL Cup		EFL Trophy		League Two play-offs	
No.	Pos	Nat	Player	Apps	Goals	Apps	Goals	Apps	Goals	Apps	Goals	Apps	Goals	Apps	Goals
1	GK	(England) ENG	Owen Goodman	53	0	46+0	0	2+0	0	3+0	0	0+0	0	2+0	0
2	DF	(England) ENG	Huseyin Biler	14	0	0+6	0	0+1	0	3+0	0	4+0	0	0+0	0
3	DF	(Republic of Ireland) IRL	James Furlong	30	0	10+12	0	1+0	0	0+3	0	3+0	0	0+1	0
4	MF	(England) ENG	Jake Reeves	32	2	28+0	2	0+0	0	2+0	0	0+0	0	2+0	0
5	DF	(Republic of Ireland) IRL	John-Joe O'Toole	10	1	7+0	1	0+0	0	0+0	0	3+0	0	0+0	0
6	DF	(Northern Ireland) NIR	Ryan Johnson	48	0	38+2	0	2+0	0	2+0	0	0+2	0	2+0	0
7	FW	(England) ENG	James Tilley	52	5	36+5	4	2+0	0	3+0	0	2+2	1	2+0	0
8	MF	(England) ENG	Callum Maycock	36	4	17+10	3	1+0	0	3+0	0	3+0	1	0+2	0
9	FW	(Lebanon) LBN	Omar Bugiel	47	7	34+5	4	2+0	1	2+1	1	0+2	1	0+1	0
10	FW	(Northern Ireland) NIR	Josh Kelly	50	3	16+24	2	0+2	0	1+1	1	4+0	0	0+2	0
11	FW	(England) ENG	Josh Neufville	55	5	46+0	4	2+0	0	0+2	0	0+3	0	2+0	1
12	MF	(England) ENG	Alistair Smith	53	6	45+0	6	2+0	0	0+3	0	0+1	0	2+0	0
14	FW	(England) ENG	Matty Stevens	56	21	41+5	17	2+0	2	1+2	1	2+1	1	2+0	0
16	MF	(England) ENG	James Ball	21	1	11+4	1	2+0	0	2+0	0	1+1	0	0+0	0
18	FW	(England) ENG	Marcus Browne	20	4	10+8	4	0+0	0	0+0	0	0+0	0	2+0	0
19	FW	(England) ENG	Osman Foyo	6	0	1+5	0	0+0	0	0+0	0	0+0	0	0+0	0
20	FW	(England) ENG	Paris Lock	1	0	0+0	0	0+0	0	0+0	0	1+0	0	0+0	0
21	MF	(Grenada) GRN	Myles Hippolyte	25	2	12+7	2	1+0	0	2+0	0	1+0	0	2+0	0
22	GK	(England) ENG	Lewis Ward	4	0	0+0	0	0+0	0	0+0	0	4+0	0	0+0	0
24	MF	(England) ENG	Harry Sidwell	1	0	0+1	0	0+0	0	0+0	0	0+0	0	0+0	0
25	DF	(England) ENG	Ethan Sutcliffe	1	0	0+0	0	0+0	0	0+0	0	0+1	0	0+0	0
26	DF	(England) ENG	Riley Harbottle	34	1	23+2	0	1+1	0	1+0	0	3+1	0	2+0	1
27	MF	(Wales) WAL	Morgan Williams	4	0	0+0	0	0+0	0	0+0	0	4+0	0	0+0	0
29	FW	(Norway) NOR	Aron Sasu	24	0	4+18	0	0+0	0	0+0	0	1+0	0	0+1	0
31	DF	(Wales) WAL	Joe Lewis	42	1	35+1	1	1+0	0	3+0	0	0+0	0	2+0	0
33	DF	(England) ENG	Isaac Ogundere	49	0	24+15	0	1+0	0	3+0	0	4+0	0	0+2	0
39	FW	(England) ENG	Joe Pigott	37	4	8+20	2	0+2	0	2+1	1	3+1	1	0+0	0
41	MF	(England) ENG	Sam Hutchinson	19	1	13+5	1	0+0	0	0+0	0	0+1	0	0+0	0
Player(s) who featured but departed the club permanently during the season:
19	MF	(Saint Kitts and Nevis) SKN	Romaine Sawyers	5	1	1+3	1	0+0	0	0+0	0	1+0	0	0+0	0
