= Ronald Brooks (cricketer) =

English cricketer

Personal information
- Full name: Ronald Clifton Brooks
- Born: 3 March 1899; East Molesey, Surrey, England
- Died: 14 August 1980 (aged 81); Chelsea, London, England
- Batting: Right-handed
- Role: Wicket-keeper
- Relatives: Meyrick Payne (father-in-law)

Domestic team information
- Years: Team
- 1919: Cambridge University
- 1921: Marylebone Cricket Club

Career statistics
Competition	First-class
Matches	5
Runs scored	99
Batting average	24.75
100s/50s	0/0
Top score	27
Catches/stumpings	1/2
- Source: Cricinfo, 8 May 2019

Ronald Clifton Brooks (3 March 1899 – 14 August 1980) OBE MC was an English first-class cricketer and British Army officer. Eitherside of a career as a partner in the family firm, Brooks served in the First World War and the Second World War, gaining the Military Cross in the former. While studying at the University of Cambridge, he also played first-class cricket for Cambridge University Cricket Club.

== Life and war service ==
Brooks was born at East Molesey in March 1899. He was educated at Haileybury. Upon the completion of his studies he was commissioned into the Queen's Royal Regiment as a second lieutenant during the closing stages of World War I. He was awarded the Military Cross in February 1919 for actions during the war. Following the war he went up to Trinity College, Cambridge. While studying at Cambridge he made three appearances in first-class cricket for Cambridge University in 1919, against the Free Foresters, the Royal Navy, and the Marylebone Cricket Club (MCC). He appeared in a first-class match for the MCC against Cambridge University in 1921.

He entered into partnership in the family commission agents and merchants firm Robert Brooks & Co. in January 1924. He later appeared in a final first-class match for the Free Foresters against Cambridge University at Fenner's in 1929. Across his five first-class appearances, Brooks scored 99 runs with a high score of 27. During the Second World War he re-enlisted as a second lieutenant with the Queen's Royal Regiment in August 1940. He was an OBE in the 1945 New Year Honours, by which point he held the rank of lieutenant colonel. He died at Chelsea in August 1980. His father-in-law was the cricketer Meyrick Payne.
