= Robert Falconer (disambiguation) =

Robert Falconer (1867–1943) was a Canadian academic.

Robert Falconer is also the name of:

- Bob Falconer (born 1962), English cricketer
- Robert Falconer (Toronto hotelier), see Spadina Hotel
- Robert Falconer, novel by George MacDonald

== See also ==
- Robert Faulknor, Royal Navy officer
- Robert Faulkner, Canadian soccer player
