= Morgan Williams (footballer, born 2004) =

Welsh footballer

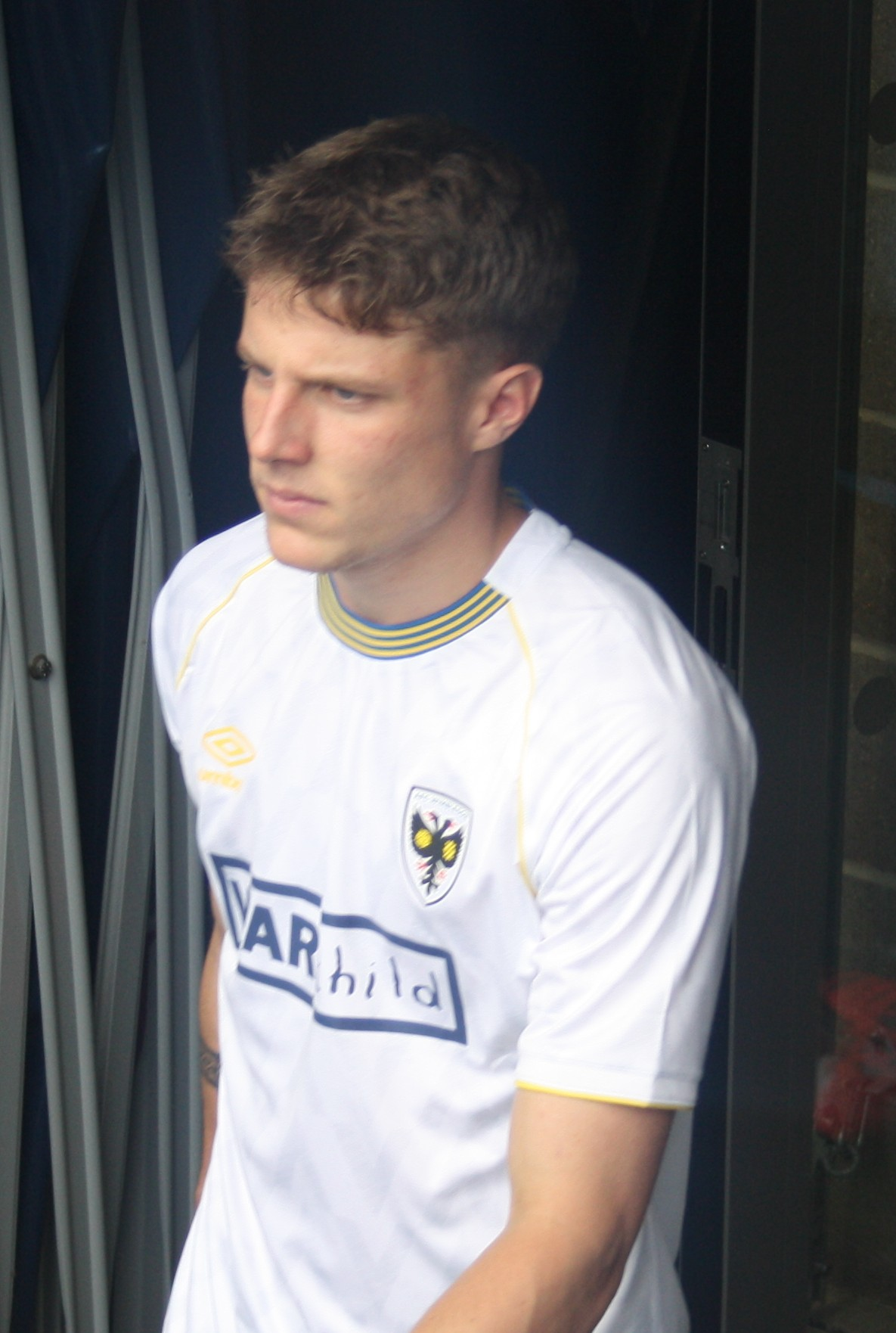
- Morgan Williams in 2025.

Personal information
- Full name: Morgan Charles Williams
- Date of birth: 11 December 2004 (age 21)
- Place of birth: London, England
- Position: Midfielder

Team information
- Current team: Harrogate Town A.F.C.
- Number: 14

Youth career
- 2011–2022: AFC Wimbledon

Senior career*
Years	Team	Apps	(Gls)
2022–2025	AFC Wimbledon	3	(0)
2023	→ Eastbourne Borough (loan)	7	(0)
2023	→ Woking (loan)	7	(0)
2024	→ Dorking Wanderers (loan)	5	(1)
2024–2025	→ Dorking Wanderers (loan)	18	(0)
2025–2026	King's Lynn Town	45	(6)
2026-	Harrogate Town A.F.C.	12	(1)

International career^{‡}
2019	Wales U15	1	(0)
2019–2020	Wales U16	4	(0)
2021–2022	Wales U18	4	(0)
2022–2023	Wales U19	2	(0)
- * Club domestic league appearances and goals as of 10:22, 3 August 2025 (UTC) ‡ National team caps and goals as of 18:12, 6 October 2023 (UTC)

Morgan Charles Williams is a professional footballer who plays as a midfielder for National League team Harrogate Town A.F.C. Born in England, he represents Wales at youth level.

== Career ==
=== AFC Wimbledon ===
Williams joined the youth academy of AFC Wimbledon as a 7 year old. He made his English Football League debut for AFC Wimbledon against Grimsby Town on 14 May 2023, the final day of the 2022–23 season.

On 6 October 2023, Williams joined Woking on a one-month loan.

In November 2024, Williams joined National League South side Dorking Wanderers on a short-term loan deal. On 29 December 2024, he returned for a second loan spell for the remainder of the season.

Williams departed AFC Wimbledon upon the expiry of his contract at the end of the 2024–25 season.

=== King's Lynn Town ===
On 31 July 2025, Williams joined National League North club King's Lynn Town.

=== Harrogate Town ===
On 16 June 2026, Williams joined National League club Harrogate Town.

== Career statistics ==
As of match played 5 April 2025

Appearances and goals by club, season and competition
Club	Season	League			FA Cup		EFL Cup		Other		Total	
Club	Season	Division	Apps	Goals	Apps	Goals	Apps	Goals	Apps	Goals	Apps	Goals
AFC Wimbledon	2022–23	League Two	1	0	0	0	0	0	0	0	1	0
AFC Wimbledon	2023–24	League Two	2	0	0	0	1	0	2 (Note: Appearance(s) in EFL Trophy)	0	5	0
AFC Wimbledon	2024–25	League Two	0	0	0	0	0	0	4	0	4	0
AFC Wimbledon	Total		3	0	0	0	1	0	6	0	10	0
Eastbourne Borough (loan)	2022–23	National League South	7	0	—		—		—		7	0
Woking (loan)	2023–24	National League	7	0	3	0	—		1 (Note: Appearance(s) in FA Trophy)	0	11	0
Dorking Wanderers (loan)	2024–25	National League South	23	1	—		—		2	0	25	1
Career total			40	1	3	0	1	0	9	0	53	1
