= Riley Harbottle =

English footballer (born 2000)

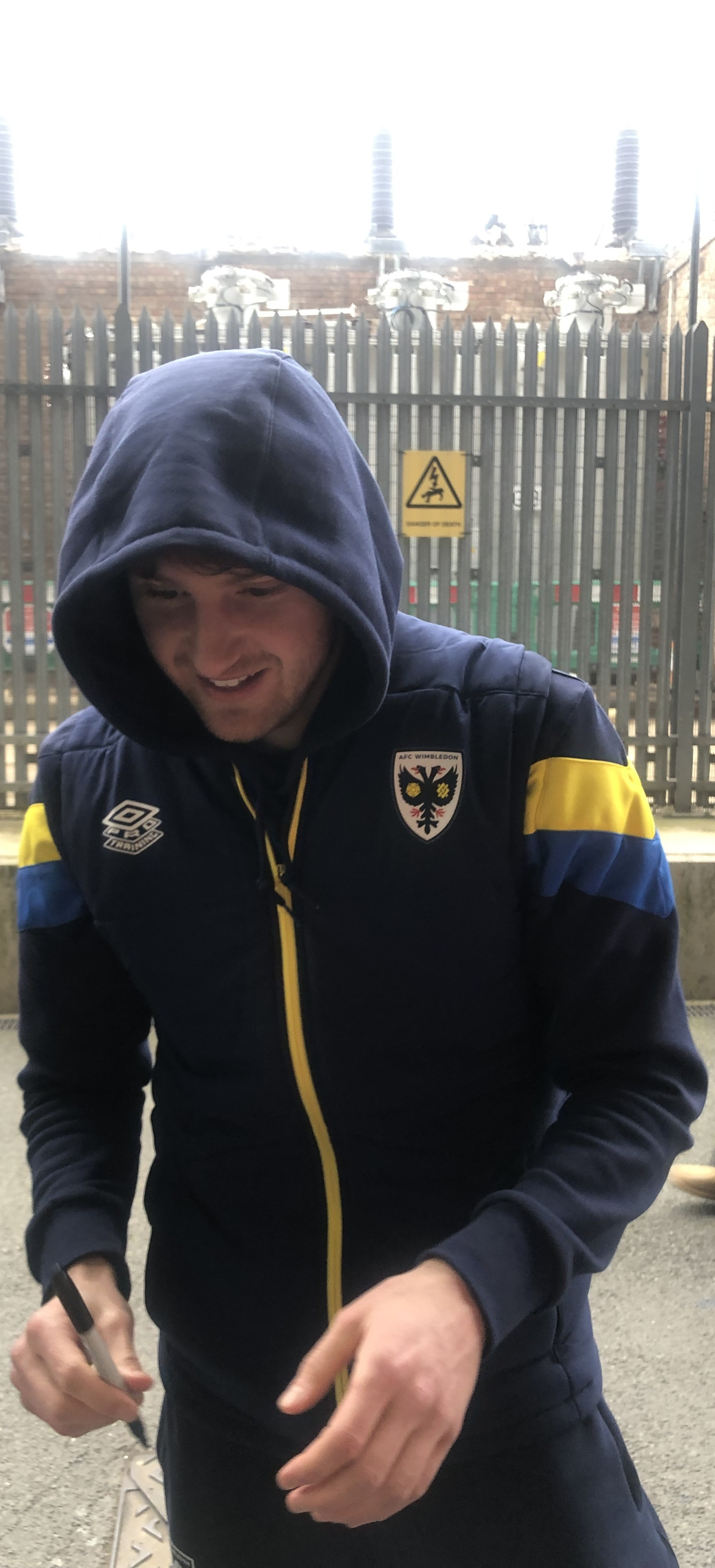
- Harbottle in 2025

Personal information
- Full name: Riley-Jay Harbottle
- Date of birth: 26 September 2000 (age 26)
- Place of birth: Nottingham, England
- Height: 1.87 m (6 ft 2 in)
- Position: Defender

Team information
- Current team: Bristol Rovers
- Number: 26

Youth career
- 2007–2021: Nottingham Forest

Senior career*
Years	Team	Apps	(Gls)
2021–2023	Nottingham Forest	0	(0)
2021	→ Wealdstone (loan)	11	(0)
2022–2023	→ Mansfield Town (loan)	32	(6)
2023–2024	Hibernian	1	(0)
2024	→ Colchester United (loan)	12	(0)
2024–2026	AFC Wimbledon	37	(0)
2026–	Bristol Rovers	15	(1)
- * Club domestic league appearances and goals as of 10:29, 3 May 2026 (UTC)

Riley-Jay Harbottle (born 26 September 2000) is an English professional footballer who plays as a defender for EFL League Two club Bristol Rovers.

== Career ==
=== Nottingham Forest ===
Harbottle joined the Nottingham Forest academy at the foundation stage, staying with the team before signing his first professional contract in October 2017. He made his first team debut for Forest on 11 August 2021, starting against Bradford City in the EFL Cup. On 20 June 2022, Harbottle signed a two-year extension to his deal with Forest, keeping him at the City Ground until the summer of 2024.

==== Loan to Wealdstone ====
On 19 March 2021, Harbottle joined National League side Wealdstone on an initial one-month loan. He remained with the club for the rest of the season, making 11 appearances.

==== Loan to Mansfield Town ====
On 16 July 2022, Harbottle moved on a season-long loan to EFL League Two side Mansfield Town.

=== Hibernian ===
On 18 July 2023, Harbottle joined Scottish Premiership side Hibernian on a three-year deal for an undisclosed transfer fee.

=== Loan to Colchester United ===
On 23 January 2024, Harbottle joined EFL League Two club Colchester United for the remainder of the 2023–24 season.

=== AFC Wimbledon ===
On 15 August 2024, Harbottle joined League Two club AFC Wimbledon on a two-year deal.

=== Bristol Rovers ===
On 16 January 2026, Harbottle joined League Two club Bristol Rovers on a free transfer, signing a two-and-a-half year deal.

== Career statistics ==
As of end of 2025–26 season

Appearances and goals by club, season and competition
Club	Season	League			National Cup		League Cup		Other		Total	
Club	Season	Division	Apps	Goals	Apps	Goals	Apps	Goals	Apps	Goals	Apps	Goals
Nottingham Forest	2020–21	Championship	0	0	0	0	0	0	—		0	0
Nottingham Forest	2021–22	Championship	0	0	0	0	2	0	—		0	0
Nottingham Forest	2022–23	Premier League	0	0	0	0	0	0	—		0	0
Nottingham Forest	Total		0	0	0	0	2	0	—		2	0
Wealdstone (loan)	2020–21	National League	11	0	0	0	0	0	0	0	11	0
Mansfield Town (loan)	2022–23	League Two	32	6	2	2	0	0	3 (Note: Appearances in EFL Trophy)	0	37	6
Hibernian	2023–24	Scottish Premiership	1	0	0	0	1	0	0	0	2	0
AFC Wimbledon	2024-25	League Two	25	0	2	0	1	0	7 (Note: Four appearances in EFL Trophy, three appearances and one goal in EFL League Two play-offs)	1	35	1
AFC Wimbledon	2025-26	League One	12	0	1	0	2	0	3 (Note: Appearances in EFL Trophy)	0	18	0
AFC Wimbledon	Total		37	0	3	0	3	0	10	1	53	1
Bristol Rovers	2025–26	League Two	15	1	0	0	0	0	0	0	15	1
Career total			96	7	4	0	5	0	13	1	120	8

== Honours ==
AFC Wimbledon

- EFL League Two play-offs: 2025
