= Owen Goodman =

Canadian soccer player (born 2003)

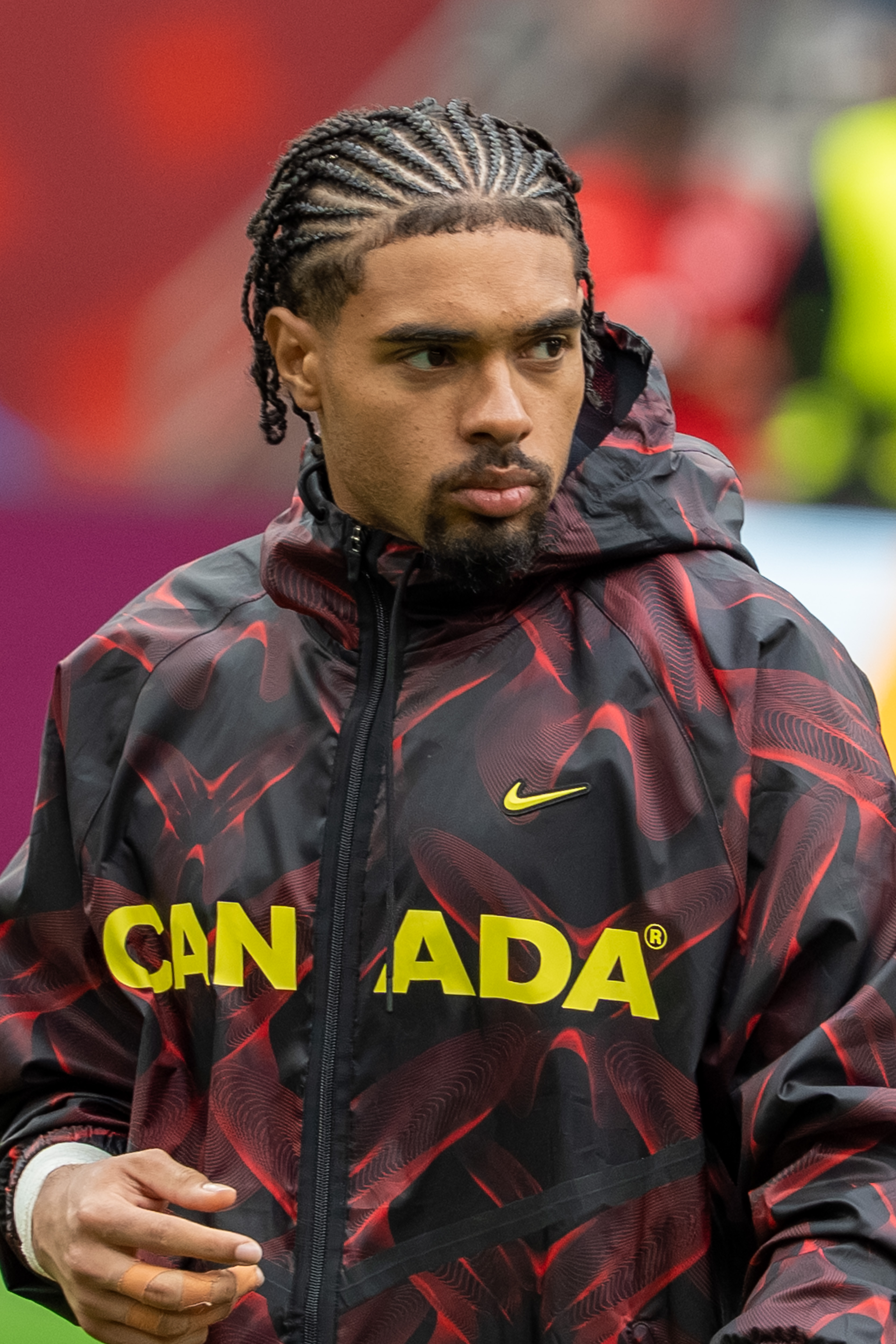
- Goodman with Canada in 2026

Personal information
- Full name: Owen Olamidayo Goodman
- Date of birth: 27 November 2003 (age 22)
- Place of birth: London, England
- Height: 1.93 m (6 ft 4 in)
- Position: Goalkeeper

Team information
- Current team: Dundee (on loan from Crystal Palace)
- Number: 1

Youth career
- South Simcoe United
- County FC Academy
- Crystal Palace

Senior career*
Years	Team	Apps	(Gls)
2022–	Crystal Palace	0	(0)
2023–2024	→ Colchester United (loan)	38	(0)
2024–2025	→ AFC Wimbledon (loan)	46	(0)
2025–2026	→ Huddersfield Town (loan)	10	(0)
2026	→ Barnsley (loan)	22	(0)
2026–	→ Dundee (loan)	13	(0)

International career^{‡}
2022	Canada U20	1	(0)
2023	England U20	2	(0)
2026–	Canada	1	(0)
- * Club domestic league appearances and goals as of 21 November 2026 ‡ National team caps and goals as of October 3, 2026

Owen Olamidayo Goodman (born 27 November 2003) is an professional soccer player who plays as a goalkeeper for Scottish Premiership club Dundee, on loan from Premier League club Crystal Palace. Born in England, he plays for the Canada national team.

== Early life ==
Goodman was born in Harold Wood, London, England. He moved to Canada with his parents when he was five and played for clubs South Simcoe United and County FC in Alliston, Ontario. During this period, he transitioned from playing as a defender to goalkeeper so that he could continue playing after training sessions.

He returned to the United Kingdom from Ontario in 2015, at the age of thirteen. He started playing with the Crystal Palace academy from under-13 level.

== Club career ==
=== Crystal Palace ===
Goodman signed a professional contract with Crystal Palace in July 2021 as a seventeen year-old.

==== 2022–23 ====
Goodman had a place on the first-team bench for Crystal Palace in the Premier League against Wolverhampton Wanderers in October 2022. He signed a contract extension with Crystal Palace in November 2022. He made the Palace first-team bench in Premier League away trips to Brighton & Hove Albion, Arsenal and Southampton.

==== 2023–24: Colchester United (loan) ====
In July 2023, Goodman joined League Two club Colchester United on a season-long loan. He made 40 appearances in all competitions for the club.

==== 2024–25: AFC Wimbledon (loan) ====
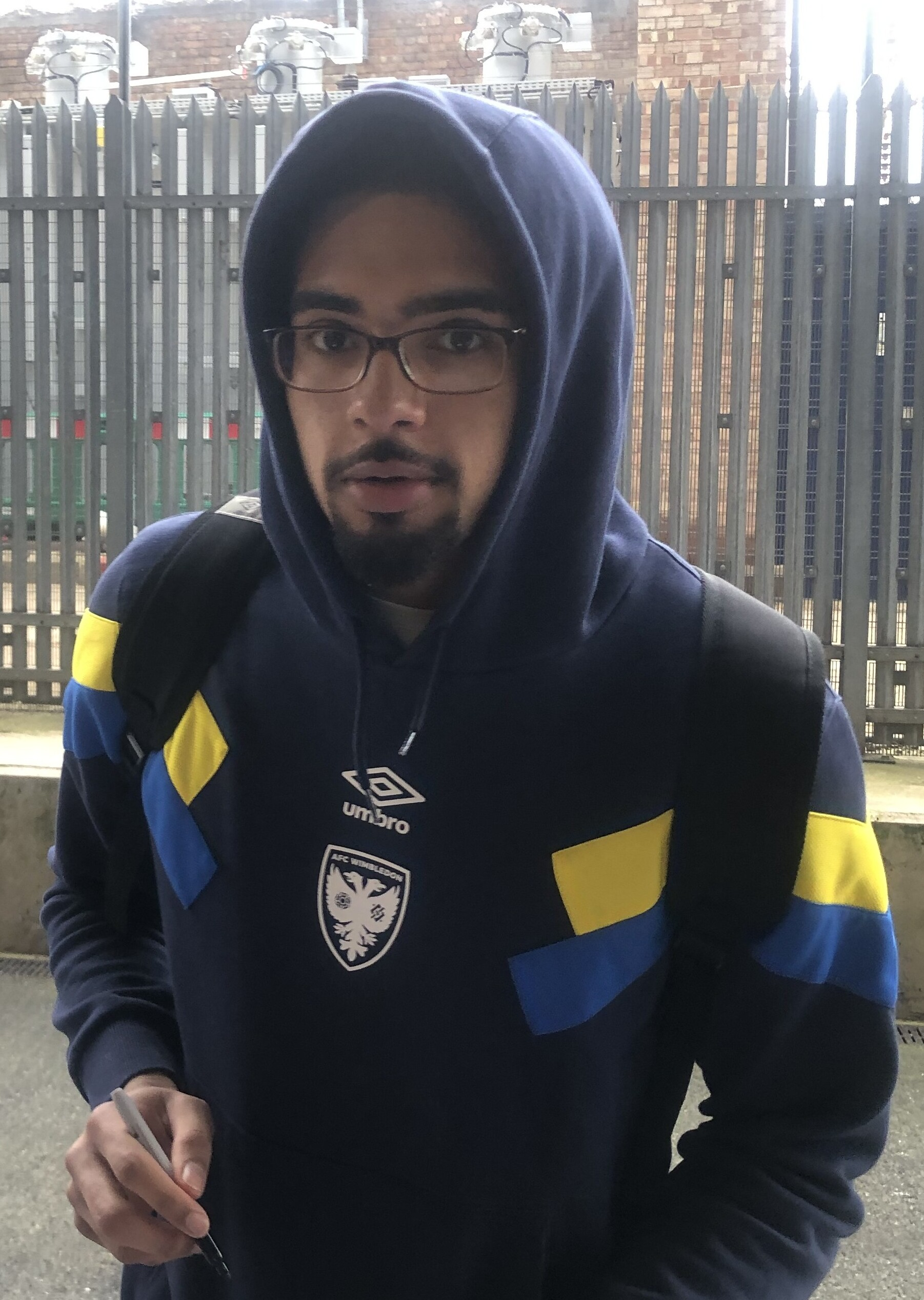
Goodman with AFC Wimbledon in 2025.

On 16 July 2024, Goodman returned to League Two for another loan spell, joining AFC Wimbledon for the duration of the 2024–25 season. In September 2024, he saved two penalties in a shoot-out to help Wimbledon knock Premier League side Ipswich Town out of the EFL Cup. On 26 May 2025, Goodman earned a clean sheet as Wimbledon defeated Walsall in the play-off final to earn promotion to League One.

During the season, as the first-choice goalkeeper, Goodman featured in every competitive fixture. He was named in the League Two Team of the Season and was awarded the League Two Golden Glove after keeping 24 of his 25 clean sheets in the league. His total placed him joint-second for the most clean sheets in a single League Two campaign.

==== 2025–26: Huddersfield Town (loan) ====
On 2 July 2025, Goodman signed for League One club Huddersfield Town for the duration of the 2025–26 season. On 8 January 2026, Goodman’s loan at Huddersfield Town was terminated early after he made 12 appearances for the club, only six of which came after September 2025.

==== 2026: Barnsley (loan) ====
On 15 January 2026, Owen Goodman joined Barnsley on loan for the remainder of the 2025–26 season following the early termination of his loan at Huddersfield Town. He made his debut two days later in a 2–1 victory over Blackpool.

==== 2026–27: Dundee (loan) ====
On 25 July 2026, Goodman joined Scottish Premiership club Dundee on a season-long loan.

== International career ==
Goodman was eligible to play for England, Canada and Nigeria. In 2025 he had expressed his dream of representing Canada's senior national team. In January 2023, Goodman was called up to a Nigeria U-20 training camp, but ultimately declined.

=== England ===
Goodman was called up to the England U-18 side in 2021. He played for the England U-20 against USA U-20 on 25 March 2023. In October 2023, he was called up to the England U-20 side for matches against Portugal U-20 and Romania U-20.

On 23 May 2025, Goodman was named to the England U21 pre-EURO training squad.

=== Canada ===
In April 2022, Goodman accepted a call-up to the Canada under-20 team for two friendlies against Costa Rica.

In August 2025, Canada's coach Jesse Marsch announced that Goodman was not eligible for Canada's national team, despite their efforts to meet eligibility requirements. However, Goodman had begun pursuing Canadian citizenship earlier that year in March, hiring a lawyer to advance his case, and later declined an approach from Nigeria while awaiting a decision. After completing the citizenship process in October 2025, he travelled to Toronto to take his citizenship oath and was subsequently named in Canada's squad for the November 2025 international window for a pair of friendlies against Ecuador and Venezuela.

In May 2026, Goodman was named in Canada's squad for the 2026 FIFA World Cup.

== Personal life ==
Goodman has an English father and a Nigerian mother.

== Career statistics ==
=== Club ===
As of match played 21 November 2026

Appearances and goals by club, season and competition
Club	Season	League			National cup		League cup		Other		Total	
Club	Season	Division	Apps	Goals	Apps	Goals	Apps	Goals	Apps	Goals	Apps	Goals
Crystal Palace	2022–23	Premier League	0	0	0	0	0	0	–		0	0
Colchester United (loan)	2023–24	League Two	38	0	1	0	1	0	0	0	40	0
AFC Wimbledon (loan)	2024–25	League Two	46	0	2	0	3	0	1	0	52	0
Huddersfield Town (loan)	2025–26	League One	10	0	0	0	0	0	2	0	12	0
Barnsley (loan)	2025–26	League One	22	0	–		–		–		22	0
Dundee (loan)	2026–27	Scottish Premiership	13	0	0	0	1	0	–		14	0
Career total			129	0	3	0	5	0	3	0	140	0

=== International ===
As of match played October 3, 2026

Appearances and goals by national team and year
National team	Year	Apps	Goals
Canada	2026	1	0
Total		1	0

== Honours ==
AFC Wimbledon

- EFL League Two play-offs: 2025

Individual

- EFL League Two Team of the Season: 2024–25
- EFL League Two Golden Glove: 2024–25
- PFA Team of the Year: 2024–25 League Two
