= Callum Maycock =

English footballer (born 1997)

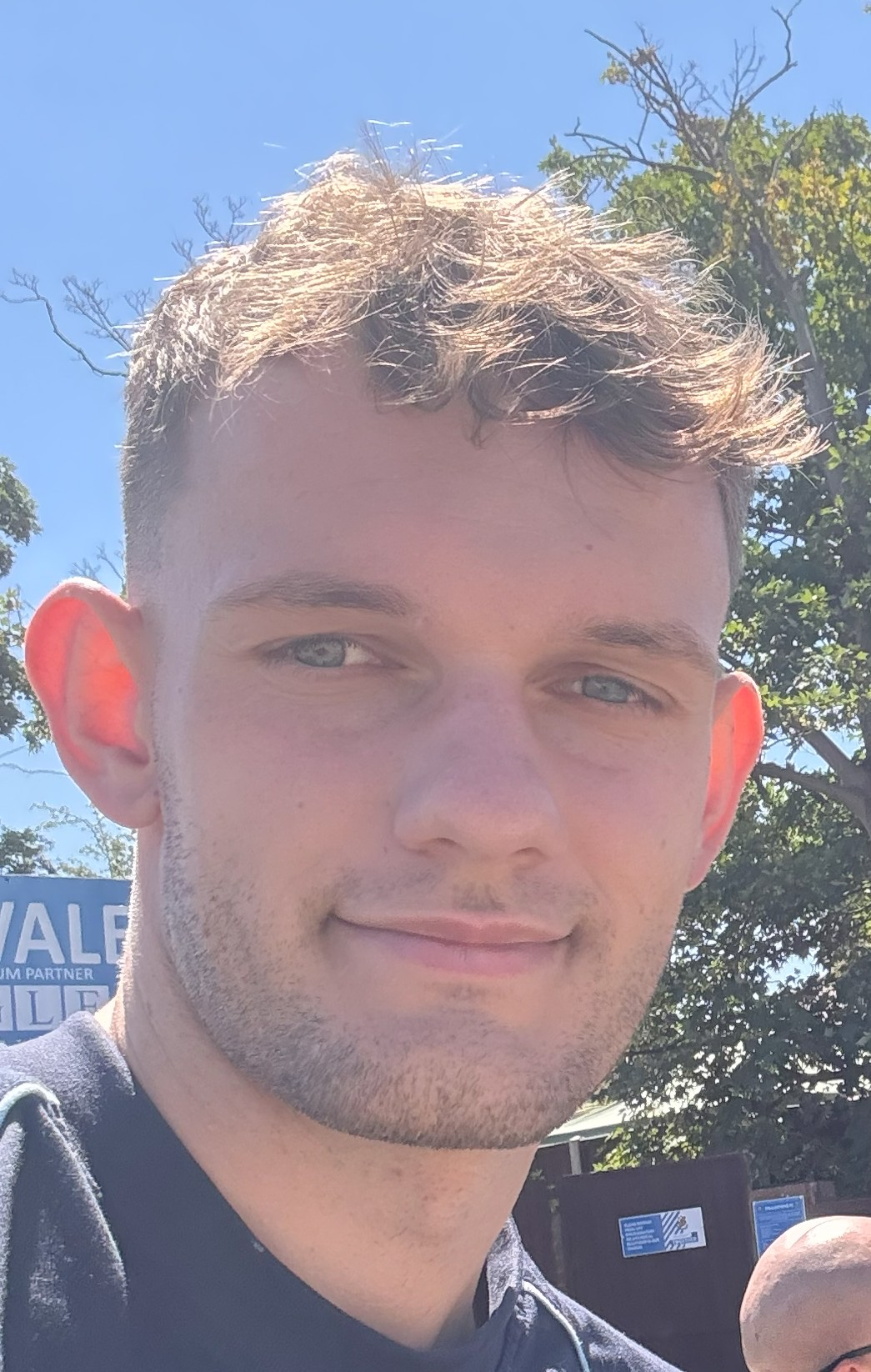
- Callum Maycock in 2025.

Personal information
- Full name: Callum Maycock
- Date of birth: 23 December 1997 (age 28)
- Place of birth: Birmingham, England
- Height: 6 ft 1 in (1.85 m)
- Position: Midfielder

Team information
- Current team: AFC Wimbledon
- Number: 8

Youth career
- –2016: Coventry City

Senior career*
Years	Team	Apps	(Gls)
2016–2020	Coventry City	4	(0)
2018–2019	→ Macclesfield Town (loan)	27	(0)
2019–2020	→ Leamington (loan)	19	(0)
2020–2024	Solihull Moors	169	(16)
2024–	AFC Wimbledon	77	(5)

International career
2024	England C	1	(0)
- * Club domestic league appearances and goals as of 1 November 2026 (UTC)

Callum Maycock (born 23 December 1997) is an English footballer who plays as a midfielder for EFL League One club AFC Wimbledon.

== Career ==
Maycock made his professional debut coming on as a substitute on 6 November 2016 in a 1–1 FA Cup draw with Morecambe, coming on to replace Andre Wright.

On 30 July 2018, Maycock was loaned out to Macclesfield Town until January 2019. The deal was later extended for the remainder of the season.

In June 2024 Maycock joined AFC Wimbledon. He scored his first goals for Wimbledon when he scored twice in a 3-0 win against rivals MK Dons on 14 September 2024. He extended his contract with the club a further two years in June 2026.

== International career ==
Maycock was called up to represent the England C team in March 2024. On 19 March, he made his debut in the 1–0 defeat to the Wales C team at Stebonheath Park.

== Career statistics ==
As of match played 2 May 2026

Appearances and goals by club, season and competition
Club	Season	League			FA Cup		EFL Cup		Other		Total	
Club	Season	Division	Apps	Goals	Apps	Goals	Apps	Goals	Apps	Goals	Apps	Goals
Coventry City	2016–17	League One	3	0	2	0	0	0	2 (Note: Appearance(s) in EFL Trophy)	0	7	0
Coventry City	2017–18	League Two	1	0	1	0	0	0	3	0	5	0
Coventry City	2018–19	League One	0	0	0	0	0	0	0	0	0	0
Coventry City	2019–20	League One	0	0	0	0	0	0	0	0	0	0
Coventry City	Total		4	0	3	0	0	0	5	0	12	0
Macclesfield Town (loan)	2018–19	League Two	27	0	0	0	3	0	2	0	32	0
Leamington (loan)	2019–20	National League North	19	0	0	0	0	0	4 (Note: Appearance(s) in FA Trophy)	1	23	1
Solihull Moors	2020–21	National League	40	0	2	0	0	0	0	0	42	0
Solihull Moors	2021–22	National League	44	5	2	0	0	0	2	1	48	6
Solihull Moors	2022–23	National League	37	3	2	0	0	0	0	0	39	3
Solihull Moors	2023–24	National League	43	8	1	0	0	0	5	1	49	9
Solihull Moors	Total		164	16	7	0	0	0	7	2	178	18
AFC Wimbledon	2024–25	League Two	27	3	1	0	3	0	6 (Note: Three appearances in EFL Trophy and three appearances in the League Two play-offs)	1	37	4
AFC Wimbledon	2025–26	League One	38	2	1	0	2	0	6	1	47	3
AFC Wimbledon	Total		65	5	2	0	5	0	12	2	84	7
Career total			279	21	12	0	8	0	30	5	325	26

== Honours ==
Solihull Moors

- FA Trophy runner-up: 2023–24

AFC Wimbledon

- EFL League Two play-offs: 2025
