= Dennis Constable =

English cricketer

Personal information
- Full name: Dennis Constable
- Born: 4 August 1925; East Molesey, Surrey, England
- Died: November 2011; Basingstoke, Hampshire, England
- Batting: Right-handed
- Role: Wicket-keeper
- Relatives: Bernie Constable (brother)

Domestic team information
- Years: Team
- 1949: Northamptonshire

Career statistics
Competition	First-class
Matches	2
Runs scored	20
Batting average	10.00
100s/50s	–/–
Top score	12
Balls bowled	–
Wickets	–
Bowling average	–
5 wickets in innings	–
10 wickets in match	–
Best bowling	–
Catches/stumpings	5/1
- Source: Cricinfo, 15 November 2011

Dennis Constable (14 August 1925 – November 2011) was a former English cricketer. Constable was a right-handed batsman who fielded as a wicket-keeper. He was born at East Molesey, Surrey.

The younger brother of Surrey cricketer Bernie Constable, Dennis made two first-class appearances for Northamptonshire in 1949 against Leicestershire and the touring New Zealanders, both at the County Ground, Northampton. In the match against Leicestershire he scored 8 runs in Northamptonshire's first-innings, before being dismissed by Gerry Lester, while in their second-innings he wasn't required to bat. In Leicestershire's first-innings he took two catches and in their second he followed up with another catch and a stumping. Against the New Zealanders, Constable batted at number eleven in Northamptonshire's first-innings, being dismissed for 12 by Ces Burke thanks to a stumping off his bowling by Frank Mooney. In their second-innings he wasn't required to bat. He took a single catch in the New Zealanders first-innings and followed that up with another in their second.
