= Josh Neufville =

English footballer (born 2003)

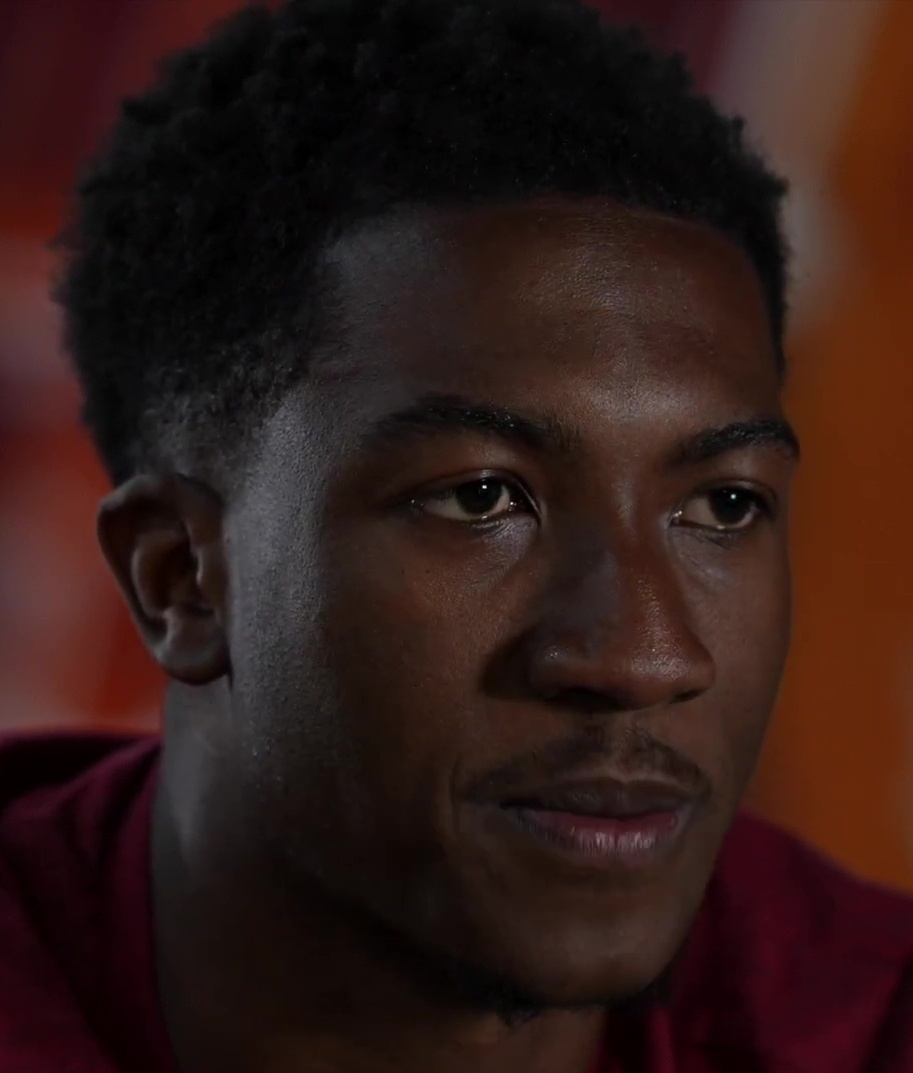
- Neufville with Bradford City in 2025

Personal information
- Full name: Joshua Tyler Neufville
- Date of birth: 22 March 2001 (age 25)
- Place of birth: Luton, England
- Height: 6 ft 0 in (1.83 m)
- Positions: Wing-back; winger

Team information
- Current team: Bradford City
- Number: 7

Youth career
- –2011: Crawley Green
- 2011–2018: Luton Town

Senior career*
Years	Team	Apps	(Gls)
2018–2023	Luton Town	0	(0)
2019–2020	→ Solihull Moors (loan)	10	(0)
2020	→ Woking (loan)	8	(0)
2020–2021	→ Yeovil Town (loan)	30	(5)
2022	→ Yeovil Town (loan)	11	(1)
2022–2023	→ Sutton United (loan)	27	(2)
2023–2025	AFC Wimbledon	87	(6)
2025–	Bradford City	50	(3)
- * Club domestic league appearances and goals as of 7 November 2026 (UTC)

Joshua Tyler Neufville (born 22 March 2001) is an English professional footballer who plays as a winger for EFL League One club Bradford City.

== Career ==
=== Luton Town ===
Born in Luton, Bedfordshire, Neufville started his career with Crawley Green before joining Luton Town's youth system in 2011 as an under-10. He signed scholarship terms in the summer of 2017, before signing a two-year professional contract with the club on 3 September 2018. Neufville made his first-team debut a day later as an 85th-minute substitute for Jorge Grant in a 2–1 home win over Brighton & Hove Albion U21s in an EFL Trophy group stage match.

He joined National League club Solihull Moors on 13 September 2019 on loan until 4 January 2020. He made 13 appearances, scoring once in a Birmingham Senior Cup tie against Boldmere St. Michaels, before being recalled by Luton. Neufville was loaned to another National League club, Woking, on 17 January 2020 for one month.

Neufville was sent out on loan to a National League team for a third time on 1 December 2020, joining Yeovil Town until 9 January 2021. After scoring his first two professional goals in his first two starts for the club, Neufville's loan was extended until the end of the 2020–21 season.

On 18 March 2022, Neufville returned to National League side Yeovil Town on loan until the end of the 2021–22 season. On 14 May 2022, Neufville was recalled by Luton Town from his loan with immediate effect.

On 9 July 2022, Neufville joined League Two side Sutton United on loan until the end of the 2022–23 season.

=== AFC Wimbledon ===
On 1 June 2023, following Luton's promotion to the Premier League, Neufville was announced to be departing the club upon the expiration of his contract. Later that day he was announced to be joining AFC Wimbledon on a two-year deal. He scored his first goal for Wimbledon against Crewe Alexandra on 16 September 2023. He scored in the 1–0 home win against Notts County in the play-off second leg.

=== Bradford City ===
On 11 June 2025, Neufville joined fellow newly promoted League One club Bradford City on a three-year deal. He made an impressive start to the 2025–26 season, scoring three goals across September 2025 as the Bantams moved to the top of the league, being named EFL League One Player of the Month for his efforts.

== Career statistics ==
As of match played 1 January 2026

Appearances and goals by club, season and competition
Club	Season	League			FA Cup		EFL Cup		Other		Total	
Club	Season	Division	Apps	Goals	Apps	Goals	Apps	Goals	Apps	Goals	Apps	Goals
Luton Town	2018–19	League One	0	0	0	0	0	0	3 (Note: Appearances in EFL Trophy)	0	3	0
Luton Town	2019–20	Championship	0	0	0	0	1	0	—		1	0
Luton Town	2020–21	Championship	0	0	0	0	0	0	—		0	0
Luton Town	2021–22	Championship	0	0	0	0	0	0	—		0	0
Luton Town	2022–23	Championship	0	0	0	0	0	0	—		0	0
Luton Town	Total		0	0	0	0	1	0	3	0	4	0
Solihull Moors (loan)	2019–20	National League	10	0	0	0	—		3 (Note: One appearance in Scottish Challenge Cup, two appearances and one goal in Birmingham Senior Cup)	1	13	1
Woking (loan)	2019–20	National League	8	0	—		—		—		8	0
Yeovil Town (loan)	2020–21	National League	30	5	—		—		0	0	30	5
Yeovil Town (loan)	2021–22	National League	11	1	—		—		2 (Note: Appearances in Somerset Premier Cup)	2	13	3
Sutton United (loan)	2022–23	League Two	27	2	0	0	1	0	4	0	32	2
AFC Wimbledon	2023–24	League Two	38	1	3	1	2	0	2	0	43	2
AFC Wimbledon	2024–25	League Two	49	5	4	0	2	0	6 (Note: Three appearances in EFL Trophy, three appearances and one goal in League Two play-offs)	1	56	5
AFC Wimbledon	Total		87	6	7	1	4	0	8	1	99	7
Bradford City	2025–26	League One	42	3	5	0	3	0	3	0	28	3
Career total			191	18	12	1	9	0	23	4	227	21

== Honours ==
AFC Wimbledon

- EFL League Two play-offs: 2025

Individual

- AFC Wimbledon Player of the Year: 2024–25
- EFL League One Player of the Month: September 2025
