= Josh Kelly (footballer, born 1998) =

Northern Irish-English footballer

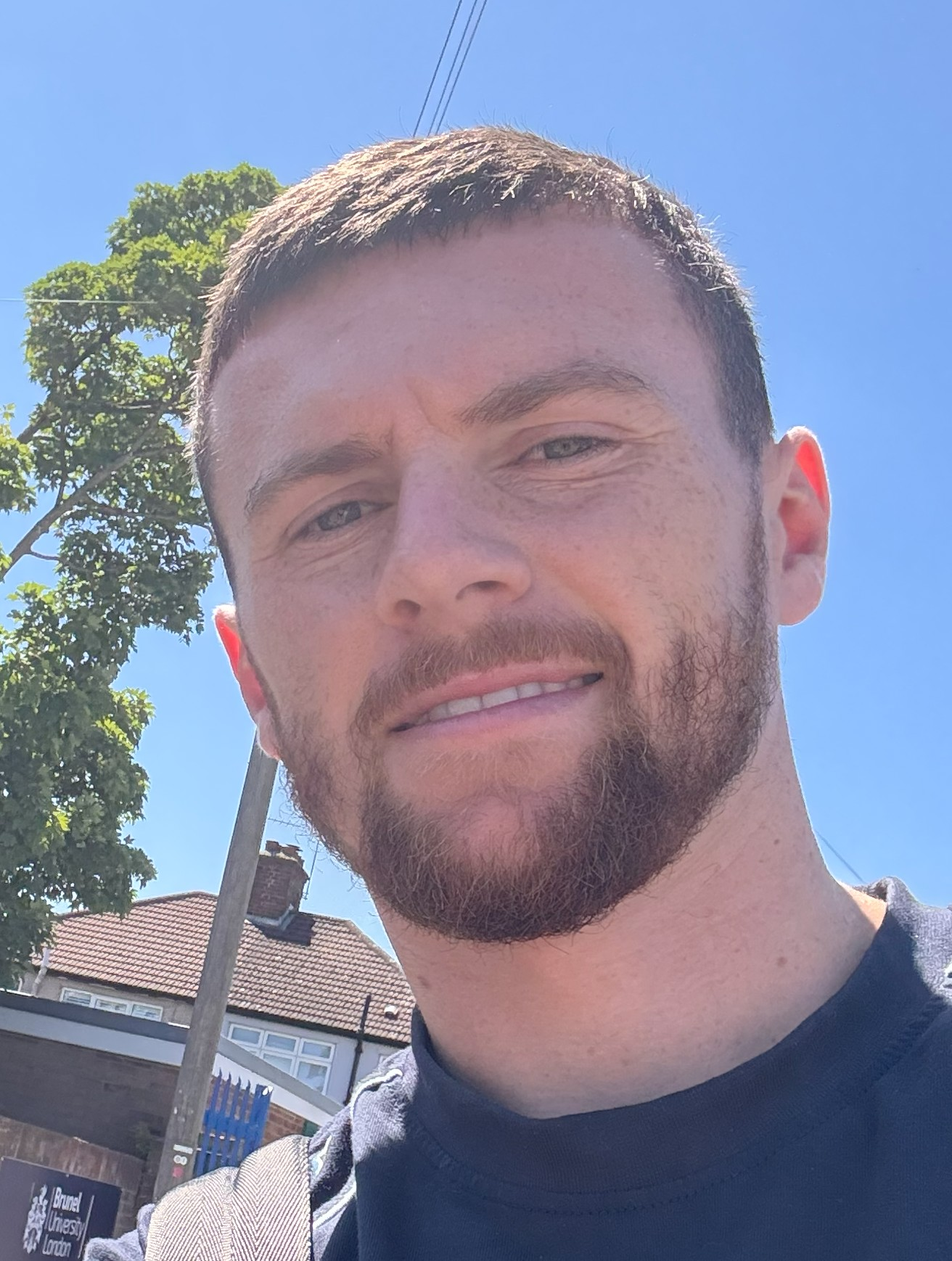
- Josh Kelly in 2025.

Personal information
- Full name: Joshua Anthony Kelly
- Date of birth: 19 December 1998 (age 27)
- Place of birth: Windsor, England
- Height: 5 ft 9 in (1.75 m)
- Position: Forward

Team information
- Current team: Woking
- Number: 9

Youth career
- –2014: Ascot United
- 2014–2015: Windsor
- 2015–2017: Maidenhead United

Senior career*
| Years | Team | Apps | (Gls) |
| 2015 | Windsor | 4 | (0) |
| 2016–2022 | Maidenhead United | 128 | (26) |
| 2017 | → Chalfont St Peter (loan) | 4 | (0) |
| 2017–2018 | → Walton Casuals (loan) | 40 | (28) |
| 2022–2024 | Solihull Moors | 72 | (24) |
| 2024–2026 | AFC Wimbledon | 57 | (4) |
| 2025–2026 | → Woking (loan) | 18 | (4) |
| 2026– | Woking | 13 | (2) |

International career
| 2019 | Northern Ireland U21 | 2 | (0) |
- * Club domestic league appearances and goals as of 20:20, 22 November 2026 (UTC)

Joshua Anthony Kelly (born 19 December 1998) is a professional footballer who plays as a forward for National League club Woking.

== Career ==
=== Windsor ===
Kelly started his career in the youth team at Ascot United before joining Windsor in 2014 aged 15. He made his first team debut as a 16-year-old in February 2015.

=== Maidenhead United ===
In summer 2015, Kelly joined the under-18 team at Maidenhead United and made his first team debut in October 2016. After two loan spell away from the club, Kelly returned to Maidenhead in summer 2018 and began to feature much more frequently in the first team across the next two seasons. He initially left the club at the end of the 2019-20 season with the intention of joining an English Football League club, but no move materialised and he returned to the Magpies ahead of the new campaign. In the 2021–22 season he reached double figures in a National League season for the first time and won the golden boot, manager's player, and players' player awards at the end of the season.

Kelly went on loan to Chalfont St Peter during the 2016–17 season.

In 2017–18, Kelly spent the entire season on loan at Walton Casuals, where he was the club's top scorer with 39 goals.

=== Solihull Moors ===
On 22 July 2022, Kelly signed a three-year deal at Solihull Moors, joining for an undisclosed fee. He scored 25 goals in 79 games in all competitions for the Moors.

=== AFC Wimbledon ===
On 1 February 2024, Kelly signed for League Two club AFC Wimbledon for an undisclosed fee, signing a two-and-a-half-year deal with the option for a third. He scored his first goals for Wimbledon when he scored twice in a 3–2 loss at Tranmere Rovers on 20 April 2024.

On 1 September 2025, Kelly joined National League side, Woking on loan for the remainder of the 2025–26 campaign.

=== Woking ===
On 29 June 2026, Kelly agreed to return to Woking on a permanent basis, signing a two-year deal with an option for a third year.

== International career ==
In March 2019, Kelly was called up to the Northern Ireland U21 squad for two friendly matches in Marbella, playing in matches against Bulgaria U21 and Mexico U21. The Irish Football Association were not sure of Kelly's eligibility when these matches were played, and it later transpired that he was not eligible to play for Northern Ireland.

== Career statistics ==
As of match played 21 November 2026

| Club | Season | League | | | FA Cup | | EFL Cup | | Other | | Total | |
| Club | Season | Division | Apps | Goals | Apps | Goals | Apps | Goals | Apps | Goals | Apps | Goals |
|---|---|---|---|---|---|---|---|---|---|---|---|---|
| Windsor | 2014–15 | CCL Premier Division | 4 | 0 | 0 | 0 | — | | 2 (Note: One appearance in CCL Premier Cup, one appearance in Berks & Bucks Senior Cup.) | 0 | 6 | 0 |
| Maidenhead United | 2016–17 | National League South | 1 | 0 | 0 | 0 | — | | 2 (Note: Two appearances and one goal in Berks & Bucks Senior Cup.) | 1 | 3 | 1 |
| Maidenhead United | 2018–19 | National League | 39 | 6 | 3 | 0 | — | | 2 (Note: One appearance in FA Trophy, one appearance in Berks & Bucks Senior Cup.) | 0 | 44 | 6 |
| Maidenhead United | 2019–20 | National League | 29 | 4 | 3 | 2 | — | | 1 (Note: Appearance(s) in FA Trophy.) | 1 | 33 | 7 |
| Maidenhead United | 2020–21 | National League | 20 | 1 | 1 | 0 | — | | 0 | 0 | 21 | 1 |
| Maidenhead United | 2021–22 | National League | 39 | 15 | 2 | 2 | — | | 0 | 0 | 41 | 17 |
| Maidenhead United | Total | | 128 | 26 | 9 | 4 | — | | 5 | 2 | 142 | 32 |
| Chalfont St Peter (loan) | 2016–17 | SFL Division One Central | 4 | 0 | 0 | 0 | — | | 2 (Note: Two appearances in Southern Football League Cup.) | 0 | 6 | 0 |
| Walton Casuals (loan) | 2017–18 | Isthmian League Division One South | 40 | 28 | 2 | 1 | — | | 9 (Note: Two appearances and one goal in FA Trophy, three appearances and three goals in Alan Turvey Trophy, one appearance and five goals in Southern Combination Challenge Cup, one appearance in Surrey Senior Cup, two appearances and one goal in Isthmian League Division One South play-offs.) | 10 | 51 | 39 |
| Solihull Moors | 2022–23 | National League | 45 | 11 | 3 | 0 | — | | 2 (Note: Two appearances FA Trophy.) | 0 | 50 | 11 |
| Solihull Moors | 2023–24 | National League | 27 | 13 | 1 | 0 | — | | 1 (Note: One appearance and one goal FA Trophy.) | 1 | 29 | 14 |
| Solihull Moors | Total | | 72 | 24 | 4 | 0 | — | | 3 | 1 | 79 | 25 |
| AFC Wimbledon | 2023–24 | League Two | 17 | 2 | 0 | 0 | 0 | 0 | 0 | 0 | 17 | 2 |
| AFC Wimbledon | 2024–25 | League Two | 39 | 2 | 2 | 0 | 2 | 1 | 7 | 0 | 50 | 3 |
| AFC Wimbledon | 2025–26 | League One | 1 | 0 | 0 | 0 | 2 | 0 | 0 | 0 | 3 | 0 |
| AFC Wimbledon | Total | | 57 | 4 | 2 | 0 | 4 | 1 | 7 | 0 | 70 | 5 |
| Woking (loan) | 2025–26 | National League | 18 | 4 | 2 | 0 | — | | 4 (Note: Three appearance and two goals in National League Cup, One appearance in FA Trophy) | 2 | 24 | 6 |
| Woking | 2026–27 | National League | 13 | 2 | 1 | 2 | — | | 2 (Note: Appearance(s) in National League Cup) | 1 | 16 | 5 |
| Career total | | | 335 | 88 | 20 | 7 | 4 | 1 | 34 | 16 | 392 | 112 |

== Honours ==
AFC Wimbledon

- EFL League Two play-offs: 2025
