= Ethan Sutcliffe =

English footballer

Personal information
- Full name: Ethan Jack Sutcliffe
- Date of birth: 20 February 2004 (age 22)
- Place of birth: Streatham, England
- Height: 1.87 m (6 ft 2 in)
- Position: Centre-back

Team information
- Current team: Tonbridge Angels

Youth career
- 2016-2018: Crystal Palace
- 2018–2021: AFC Wimbledon

Senior career*
Years	Team	Apps	(Gls)
2021–2026	AFC Wimbledon	1	(0)
2022	→ Salisbury (loan)	5	(0)
2023	→ King's Lynn Town (loan)	1	(0)
2023–2026	→ Tonbridge Angels (loan)	86	(9)
2026-	Tonbridge Angels	0	(0)
- * Club domestic league appearances and goals as of 17:43, 6 May 2026 (UTC)

Ethan Jack Sutcliffe (born 20 February 2004) is an English footballer who plays as a defender for National League South club Tonbridge Angels.

== Career ==
On 26 October 2021, Sutcliffe made his professional AFC Wimbledon debut in an EFL Trophy defeat to Crystal Palace U21s, where he previously spent time as a youngster. In June 2022, he signed a first professional contract with the club. In the early weeks of the 2022–23 season, he joined Southern Football League Premier Division South club Salisbury on a youth-loan until mid-January. A broken tibia and ligament damage sustained two months after the move saw him ruled out of action for the remainder of his loan spell. He made his league debut in September 2023, off the bench in a 2–1 defeat to Stockport County. Later in the month he joined King's Lynn Town, heading out to Tonbridge Angels on a similar loan agreement following his return. In November 2025, Sutcliffe returned to National League South club Tonbridge Angels for a third loan spell, joining until January 2026.

On 27 June 2026, Sutcliffe agreed to return to Tonbridge Angels on a permanent basis following his release from AFC Wimbledon.

== Career statistics ==
As of match played 25 April 2026

Appearances and goals by club, season and competition
Club	Season	League			FA Cup		League Cup		Other		Total	
Club	Season	Division	Apps	Goals	Apps	Goals	Apps	Goals	Apps	Goals	Apps	Goals
AFC Wimbledon	2021–22	League One	0	0	0	0	0	0	1 (Note: Appearance(s) in EFL Trophy)	0	1	0
AFC Wimbledon	2022–23	League Two	0	0	0	0	0	0	0	0	0	0
AFC Wimbledon	2023–24	League Two	1	0	0	0	0	0	1	0	2	0
AFC Wimbledon	2024–25	League Two	0	0	0	0	0	0	1	0	1	0
AFC Wimbledon	2025–26	League One	0	0	0	0	0	0	0	0	0	0
AFC Wimbledon	Total		1	0	0	0	0	0	3	0	4	0
Salisbury (loan)	2022–23	Southern League Premier Division South	5	0	2	0	—		1 (Note: Appearance(s) in FA Trophy)	0	8	0
King's Lynn Town (loan)	2023–24	National League North	1	0	0	0	—		0	0	1	0
Tonbridge Angels (loan)	2023–24	National League South	28	2	0	0	—		1	0	29	2
Tonbridge Angels (loan)	2024–25	National League South	29	2	1	0	—		1	0	31	2
Tonbridge Angels (loan)	2025–26	National League South	29	5	—		—		—		29	5
Tonbridge Angels (loan)	Total		86	9	1	0	—		2	0	89	9
Tonbridge Angels	2026–27	National League South	0	0	0	0	—		0	0	0	0
Career total			93	9	3	0	0	0	6	2	102	9
