= West Molesey houseboat =

Houseboat on the River Thames

The West Molesey houseboat is a residential barge moored on the River Thames, in West Molesey. Some locals call it the slumboat.

The boat has made press frequently due to legal actions from the Environment Agency, and grievances on its occupants' behaviour and illegal discharges, from locals. As of March 2016, the boat has been moored illegally alongside Hurst Park for at least nine months. It is moored at a free, 24-hour mooring site and has overstayed. In early September 2015, the Environment Agency gave it a "notice of trespass" and requested the barge to be moved within 14 days. In November 2015 the agency announced it will be imposing fines to boats docked for longer than 24 hours. The agency said that it would be seeking legal compliance in the County Court.

Newspaper journalists found neighbours in nearby Sadler's Ride early on referred to the boat as a "slumboat", and identified human and canine excrement from the boat. A local boater complained that, due to its mooring, other boats cannot use the 24-hour mooring spaces.

Owner, Alistair Trotman, told a newspaper that he bought an EA river licence for 2015 and the barge was "fully comprehensively insured through Euro marine, despite the fact that nonpowered barges are only required to have third party insurance".

The boat was in the news again in March 2016, still at Hurst Park. The BBC secretly filmed the interior, and asked a Chartered Surveyor and Member of the Association for Specialist Fire Protection to spend a night on board and give his views. He described it as a "bonfire", and "timber with loads of holes waiting for a match". He noted that the boat had no firestops at all. The owner responded to the concerns by saying that the boat had been fitted with fire alarms, fire exits, CO_{2} alarms, fire blankets and fire extinguishers, that no smoking was permitted on the boat at all, and that the onboard coal stoves had concrete-and-steel surrounds.

Cabin boy Scott Sterland stated "I have experienced 3 slammings since residing on the boat".

The owner had had to pay compensation for two other boats of £1,812.69 and costs of £60, totalling £1,872.69; for the Hui and Old Kingston Coal, moored without valid licences in Teddington Reach.
