= Michael Underwood (physician) =

English physician and surgeon (1737–1820)

- Born: 29 September 1737; West Molesey, Surrey, England
- Died: 14 March 1820 (aged 82); Knightsbridge, London, England
- Occupation: Physician
- Medical career
- Profession: Surgeon

Michael Underwood (29 September 1737 – 14 March 1820) was an English physician and surgeon, born in West Molesey in Surrey. He is a relevant figure in the history of medicine and pediatrics for having given the first known description of several childhood diseases, infantile paralysis and polio included.

== Early life ==
Michael Underwood was born on 29 September 1737. He received a good education, first at West Molesey School in Surrey and then at Kensington, London. Underwood wished to continue enter the medical profession, and gained the attention of eminent surgeon Sir Cæsar Hawkins, 1st Baronet, who had served as sergeant-surgeon to George II. Hawkins secured Underwood an appointment as a house pupil at St. George's Hospital, where he studied under Hawkins for several years. In later life, Underwood expressed his indebtedness to this “long residence in one of the largest and best conducted hospitals in the metropolis."

== Early career ==
After living briefly in Paris, Underwood became a member of the Surgeon's Company and established a practice in both surgery and obstetrics in Margaret Street, Cavendish Square. He was later appointed surgeon to the British Lying‐in Hospital in London.

In 1783, Underwood published Treatise upon ulcers of the legs, scrophulous sores and mammary abscesses (1783), "in which former methods of treatment were candidly examined and compared, with one more rational and safe, proving that a perfect cure may generally be effected more certainly, without rest and confinement, than by the strict regimen in common use." He included "an introduction on the process of ulceration and the origin of pus laudabile: to which are added hints on a successful method of treating some scrophulous tumors and the mammary abscess and sore nipples of lying-in women." This work was reviewed in The English Review, where it was favorably viewed:

We recommend it as a very useful work to the practitioners of surgery, in which they will find some new and useful suggestions, many absurd and common prejudices successfully combated, and some almost obsolete modes of practice revived, and established upon experience, and upon principles in general new.

— The English Review, Or, An Abstract of English and Foreign Literature (1783)

== Career highlights ==
In 1784, then working as physician rather than surgeon for the British Lying-in Hospital in London, Underwood published his most famous text, A treatise on the diseases of children, with general directions for the management of infants from birth. Underwood's book featured many new descriptions of pediatric diseases and illnesses, including sclerema neonatorum (which became known as Underwood's disease); it also contained the first description of infantile paralysis. Underwood's pediatric Treatise brought him fame and distinction. Over the next 60 years his book went through 10 editions, seven during his lifetime and three more after his death, edited by Samuel Merriman (1826), Marshall Hall (1835), and H Davies (1846). It was also published in France, Germany, and America.

In 1789, Underwood became the first person to give a clinical description of Poliomyelitis, which he referred to as "a debility of the lower extremities." He was later elected a member of the Royal College of Physicians in London.

In 1796, Underwood was chosen as accoucheur at the birth of Princess Charlotte of Wales. In 1801, he fell sick and retired from his profession. That time was economically difficult for him, but, as a religious man, he later "regained its healthy tone, and he was enable to realize the hopes and consolations of the Gospel."

== Death ==
Underwood died at Knightsbridge on 14 March 1820, aged 82. He was buried in Whitefield's Tabernacle, Tottenham Court Road in London.

== Posthumous publication ==
His fame had not led to great wealth, and his widowed daughter was left unsupported by his death. In order to help her financially, friends published Extracts from the Diary of the late Michael Underwood, M.D. consisting of Mediation, Critical and Practical Remarks on various Passages of Scripture, Miscellaneous Essays, and Occasional Hymns in 1823. Underwood's diary (composed of 122 volumes) recounted the minutiae of his daily life, along with meditations on various other subjects, especially religious ones. A review from The Literary Chronicle noted:

[It] embraces a period of more than sixty years, during which it was the constant practice of Dr. Underwood to commit to paper the occurrences of each day for his own personal gratification; his domestic circumstances, professional visits, religious impressions, and Christian duties, were all entered as in a day-book without any regard to order or arrangement.

A review of the book in The Monthly Repository described the physician as "a man of sincere and deep piety; his creed was highly Calvinistic." The work was said to be mournful at times, and another review in The London Literary Gazette said that "its author seems to have overshadowed and bewildered his mind by painful metaphysical contemplation of the greatest mysteries of religion; but he displays a Christian, if a too intense, anxiety to arrive at truth and satisfy his soul."

== Works ==
- Treatise upon ulcers of the legs, scrophulous sores and mammary abscesses (1783)
  - See Surgical tracts, containing a treatise upon ulcers of the legs (1788)
- A Treatise on the Diseases of Children: With Directions for the Management of Infants;
- Extracts from the diary of the late Michael Underwood, MD (1823)
