= Bernie Constable =

English cricketer

Personal information
- Full name: Bernard Constable
- Born: 19 February 1921; East Molesey, Surrey, England
- Died: 14 May 1997 (aged 76); Huntingdon, Huntingdonshire, England
- Batting: Right-handed
- Bowling: Leg break

Domestic team information
- Years: Team
- 1939–1964: Surrey

Career statistics
Competition	First-class	List A
Matches	446	2
Runs scored	18,849	4
Batting average	30.45	2.00
100s/50s	27/96	0/0
Top score	205*	4
Balls bowled	5,517	0
Wickets	64	–
Bowling average	47.14	–
5 wickets in innings	1	–
10 wickets in match	0	–
Best bowling	5/131	–
Catches/stumpings	180/–	1/–
- Source: Cricinfo, 16 June 2022

Bernard Constable (19 February 1921 – 14 May 1997) was an English first-class cricketer who played for Surrey from 1939 to 1964. He was a member of the Surrey team that won seven successive County Championships from 1952 to 1958.

== Career ==
Constable was born to a family of boat builders in East Molesey, Surrey, in 1921. Playing for the Surrey club East Molesey for the earlier part of his career, he was a right-handed batsman, occasional leg-break bowler, and brilliant fieldsman at cover point.

After service in the Royal Air Force, Constable established himself in the Surrey team in 1948. He scored 18,849 runs in first-class cricket at an average of 30.45, including 27 centuries. In his 434 matches for Surrey his highest innings was 205 not out in five hours against Somerset at The Oval in 1952. Small in stature, Constable was a fine cutter of the ball. His most successful season was 1961, when he scored 1799 runs, despite having had a kneecap removed. He batted up and down the order as the needs of the team demanded. He was a useful leg-spinner early in his career, becoming an occasional change bowler later on. Micky Stewart said of Constable: "He knew the game inside out and every first-class player inside out. I learned more about cricket from Bernie Constable than from anyone else."

He died in Huntingdon in May 1997, aged 76. His brother Dennis was also a first-class cricketer.
