= Meyrick Payne =

English cricketer

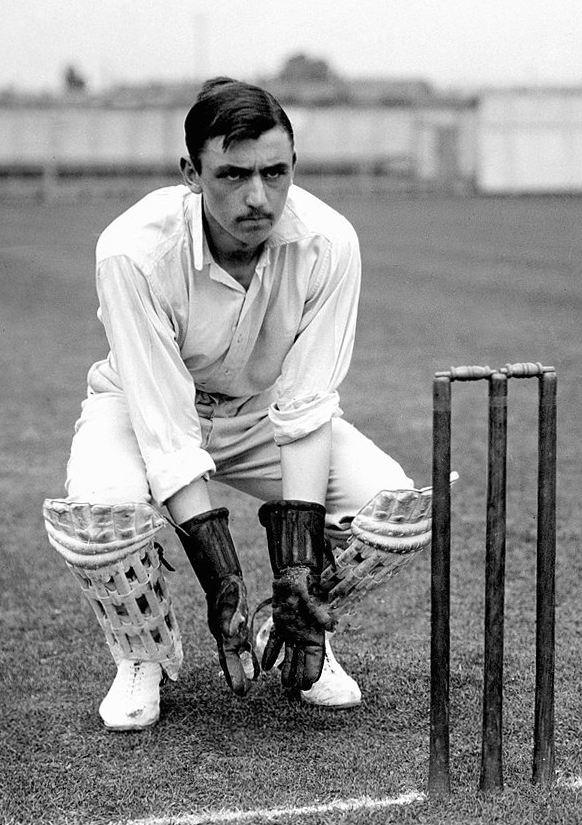
- Payne pictured in around 1905

Personal information
- Full name: Meyrick Whitmore Payne
- Born: 10 May 1885; Fulham, London
- Died: 2 June 1963 (aged 78); Little Easton, Essex
- Batting: Right-handed
- Bowling: Right-arm fast
- Role: Batter/wicketkeeper

Domestic team information
- Years: Team
- 1904–1907: Cambridge University
- 1904–1909: Middlesex

Career statistics
Competition	First-class
Matches	86
Runs scored	3,547
Batting average	24.80
100s/50s	5/14
Top score	178
Balls bowled	134
Wickets	3
Bowling average	43.33
5 wickets in innings	0
10 wickets in match	0
Best bowling	2/27
Catches/stumpings	116/33
- Source: CricInfo, 27 April 2023

Meyrick Whitmore Payne (10 May 1885 – 2 June 1963) was an English first-class cricketer who played for Middlesex County Cricket Club between 1904 and 1909. He also played in first-class matches for Cambridge University, being captain of the team in 1907, and although his last County Championship match was in 1909, he appeared in occasional first-class games for amateur teams up to 1929.
