= Bob Falconer =

English cricketer

Personal information
- Full name: Robert John Falconer
- Born: 26 December 1962 (age 63); East Molesey, Surrey, England
- Batting: Right-handed
- Bowling: Right-arm off break

Domestic team information
- Years: Team
- 1999: Surrey Cricket Board

Career statistics
Competition	LA
Matches	1
Runs scored	6
Batting average	6.00
100s/50s	–/–
Top score	6
Balls bowled	–
Wickets	–
Bowling average	–
5 wickets in innings	–
10 wickets in match	–
Best bowling	–
Catches/stumpings	–/–
- Source: Cricinfo, 30 October 2010

Robert 'Bob' John Falconer (born 26 December 1962) is a former English cricketer. Falconer was a right-handed batsman who bowled right-arm off break. He was born in East Molesey, Surrey.

Falconer represented the Surrey Cricket Board in a single List A cricket match against Cheshire in the 1999 NatWest Trophy. In his only List A match, he scored 6 runs.
