= Molesey =

Suburban district in Surrey, England

Coordinates: 51.401°N 0.363°W

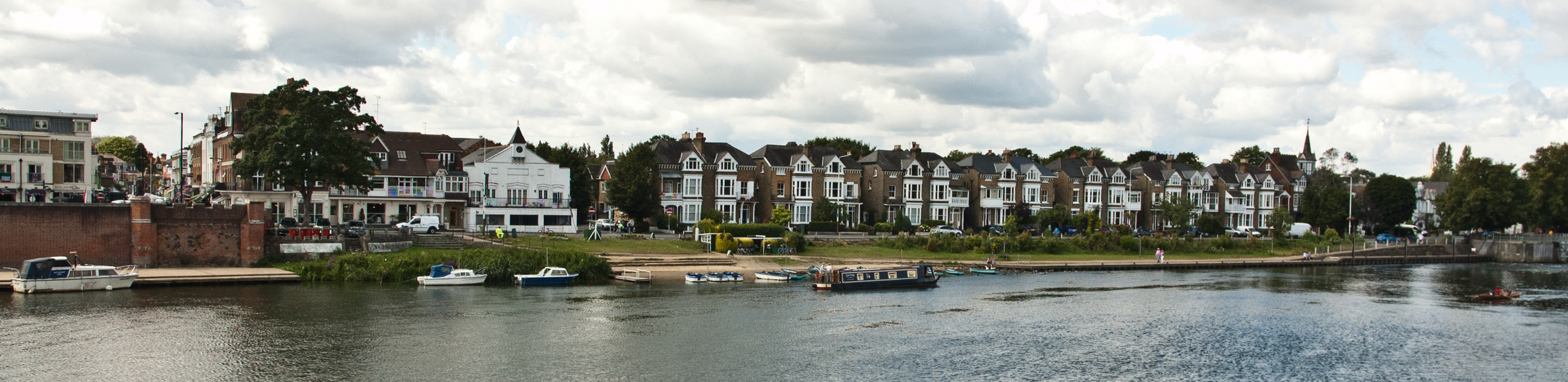
- Riverbank

- Location within Surrey
- Area: 5.87 km^{2} (2.27 sq mi)
- Population: 20,533 (2021 census)
  - Density: 3,498/km^{2} (9,060/sq mi)
- OS grid reference: TQ145675
  - Charing Cross: 12 mi (19 km) NE
- District: Elmbridge
- Shire county: Surrey
- Region: South East
- Country: England
- Sovereign state: United Kingdom
- Post town: EAST MOLESEY; WEST MOLESEY
- Postcode district: KT8
- Dialling code: 020
- Police: Surrey
- Fire: Surrey
- Ambulance: South East Coast
- UK Parliament: Esher and Walton

Molesey is a suburban neighbourhood comprising two large villages, East Molesey and West Molesey, in the Borough of Elmbridge, Surrey, England, and within the Greater London Built-up Area. Molesey is situated on the south bank of the River Thames.

East and West Molesey share a high street and there is a second retail restaurant-lined street (Bridge Road) close to Hampton Court Palace in the eastern part of the district, which is also home to Hampton Court railway station in Transport for London's Zone 6. Molesey Hurst or Hurst Park is a large park by the River Thames in the north of the area, and is home to East Molesey Cricket Club. The Hampton Ferry runs from here to Hampton on the Middlesex bank, from where it is a short walk to the central area of Hampton.

Molesey is divided into three wards: Molesey South, East and West. The majority of Molesey's detached properties are in the east, which also contains the highest proportion of apartments of the three wards.

== History ==
The earliest documentary evidence of a settlement in Molesey appears in a 7th-century charter, shortly after Erkenwald founded Chertsey Abbey in AD 666. He secured from Frithwald, sub-king of Surrey, a charter endowing the abbey with much of the surrounding land, including Muleseg. Etymologists suggest that the town's name is derived from the personal name Mul compounded with the Old English word eg, meaning an island or river meadow – thus Mul's Island. The name was pronounced 'mule' and, like that hybrid animal, denoted the offspring of mixed parentage, probably of a Saxon father and a Celtic mother . Therefore, Molesey is not, as commonly believed, named after the River Mole that runs through it. The prefixes East and West did not appear until about the year 1200, before which there was only one parish centered around what is now known as East Molesey. Molesey lay within the Saxon administrative district of Elmbridge hundred.

East Molesey appears in the Domesday Book of 1066 as Moleshire. It was held partly by John from Richard Fitz Gilbert and partly by Roger d'Abernon. Its Domesday assets were: 2 hides and 3 virgates. It had 7 ploughs, 2 oxen, and 32 acres (13 ha) of meadow and woodland worth 10 hogs. It rendered £6 15s 0d. West Molesey was held by Odard Balistarius. Its Domesday assets were: 1 hide, 1 church, and 5 ploughs. It rendered £4.

Along with neighbouring Thames Ditton, East Molesey formed a part of the ancient parish of Kingston upon Thames, based at the historic All Saints Church, Kingston upon Thames. From 1933, the Urban District of East and West Molesey became part of the Esher Urban District, which was originally recommended by the Royal Commission on Local Government in Greater London (the Herbert Commission) for inclusion within the new ceremonial county of Greater London. In 1974, the district eventually merged with its neighbour to the west, Walton and Weybridge Urban District, to form the new borough of Elmbridge within Surrey.

Molesey was one of the many villages and towns along the Thames Valley affected by flooding in 1968; specifically here the flooding of the River Mole. Some barriers and overflow fields have been created since then by the Environment Agency and its precursors.

The boundary between East and West Molesey uses a roughly due north–south compass axis, based on a point of division by the Molesey Stone on the grass outside Molesey Library on Walton Road, though the Stone has been moved from its original position and the actual boundary between East and West Molesey has become somewhat blurred and disputed.

=== Women's suffrage ===
On 8 June 1913, the grandstand at the former Hurst Park Racecourse in Molesey was virtually destroyed after an arson attack by suffragettes Kitty Marion and Clara Giveen. The attack was said to be in revenge for the death of Emily Davison at the Epsom Derby earlier that month. The pair were arrested the following day and imprisoned for three years, although both were released early after going on hunger strike.

== Locality ==
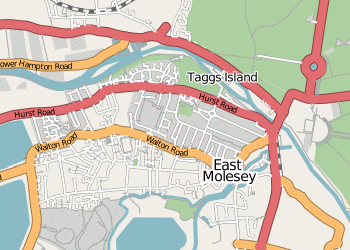
West Molesey, East Molesey and Hampton Court

Molesey is directly south of the River Thames, with several large reservoirs bordering the town to the west and south that provide water within the London Basin. Some of these are now disused and are being converted into nature reserves. To the west lie Bessborough Reservoir and Knight Reservoir, to the north-west Molesey Reservoirs, to the south Island Barn Reservoir, and to the south-west Queen Elizabeth II Reservoir. There are walks beside Metropolitan green belt fields to the south along the river Mole to Esher, and to the west along the Thames Path to Walton-on-Thames.

Hampton Court Palace lies immediately north-east of East Molesey, across Hampton Court Bridge.

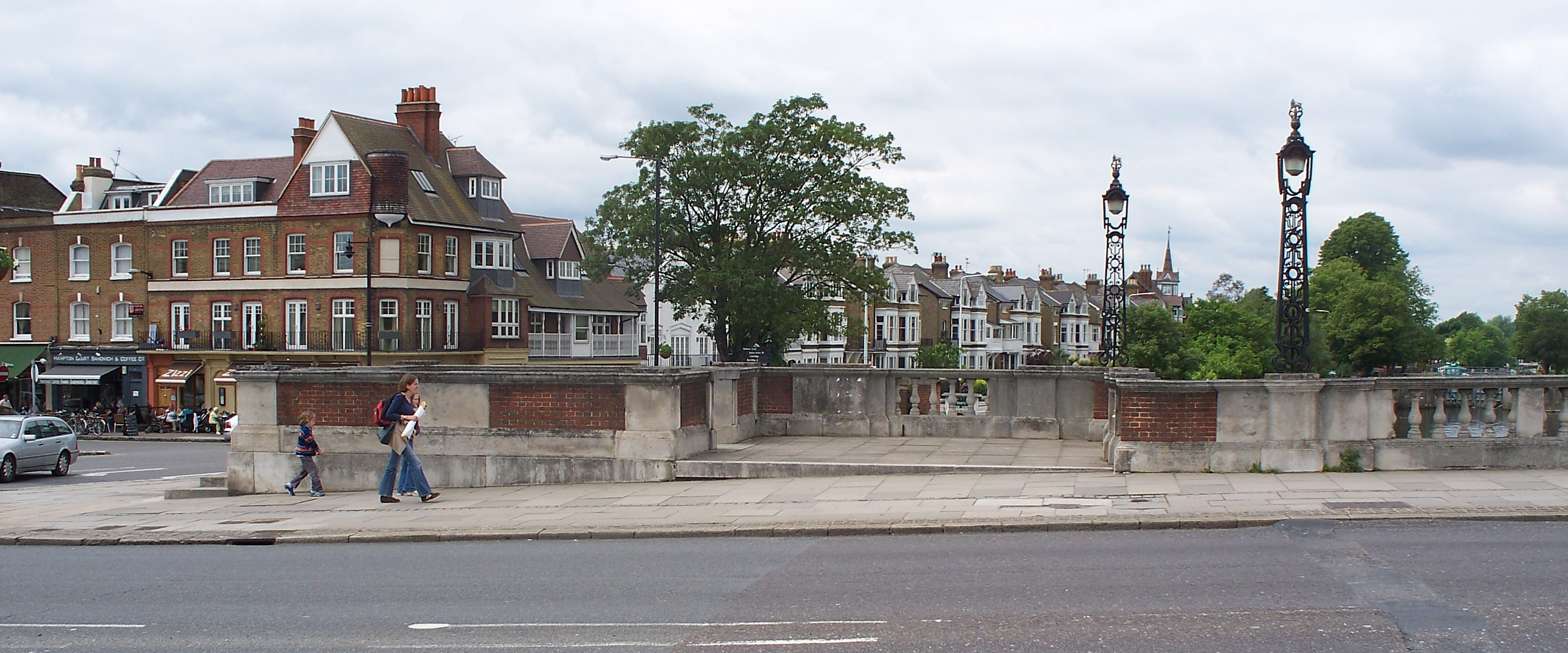
Hampton Court Bridge and East Molesey Riverbank

The Palace, together with the southern part of Bushy Park and most of Hampton Court Park are in the post town of East Molesey.

Molesey Lock is just above Hampton Court Bridge, downstream of Sunbury Lock and upstream of Teddington Lock. Cigarette Island Park is just below the bridge, occupying the eastern extremity of the town.

Hurst Park is on the south bank of the Thames, from where there is a daily ferry service to Hampton on the Middlesex bank. It was home to a horse racing course from 1890 to 1962.

The residential streets of East Molesey run directly into Weston Green and the northernmost stretches of residential Esher to the south, and Thames Ditton to the east and south-east. Together with the reservoirs, Green Belt land to the west and south-west divides West Molesey from Walton on Thames.

The central shopping area of Kingston upon Thames lies 1.7 miles (2.7 km) east of Bridge Road in East Molesey, while central Walton on Thames lies 2.3 miles (3.7 km) to the west-southwest of West Molesey High Street.

=== Landmarks ===
Molesey itself has some interesting landmarks, including three listed Church of England churches and The Bell, a public house, formerly known as "The Crooked House", built in the mid-15th century. Other landmarks include The Jubilee Fountain in Bridge Road. There are three designated Conservation Areas in East Molesey.

Other historic buildings include the Grade II-listed Matham Manor, an altered 15th-century house with timber frames and red brick; and a 16th-century house, Quillets Royal, with an 18th-century extension (The Manor House). Both buildings lie near The Bell in Bell Road/Matham Road.

In April 2017, 15th-century St Peter's Church on Walton Road, said to be the oldest building in Molesey, had lead stolen from the roof and historic masonry damaged in a nighttime theft. Thieves used scaffolding put up to install an antenna approved by Elmbridge Council. Press reports alleged that police had been alerted to the crime by a local resident but that they had declined to attend.

=== Scout groups ===
Molesey has three Scout groups which all belong to Esher District. 1st Molesey is a Royal Navy-recognised Sea Scout group whilst 2nd and 3rd Molesey are both Land Scout Groups. All groups have sections from Beavers right through to Explorers. The groups take part in a wide variety of activities and events throughout the year at various locations.

== River channels, flooding and speculative building ==
Molesey's conservation area is bordered to the south by a corollary channel of the River Mole, known as the River Ember, where successive environment authorities have implemented capacity-adding flood defences following a widespread and costly flood in 1968. Following further extensive flooding along the Thames in 2014, the Environment Agency is to carry out more large scale 'capacity building' work involving the construction of nine miles (14 km) of new channels in areas upstream of Molesey as part of a flood relief project known as the River Thames Scheme (RTS) running between 2018 and 2027.

Before 1968, the whole area including expensive areas such as East Molesey flooded badly on a regular basis as they are in part located on the former flood plains of the Thames and the Mole. Even today localised flooding and standing water can be quite common in times of heavy rain as the area is very low lying and flat. Molesey can be the subject of flood warnings that affect the Thames Valley.

Molesey Lock is the third lock (and weir) on the River Thames, after Richmond and Teddington locks, and marks the furthest point upstream that the influence of the tides on the Thames (regulated by the Thames Barrier at Woolwich) may be registered. The lock is located within 100 metres (330 ft) of Hampton Court Bridge, designed by architect Sir Edwin Lutyens.

In the West Molesey area, some houses are the result of over-optimistic development in the 1930s by developer Donald Gordon Howard, who eventually went bankrupt trying to sell houses at exceptionally low prices – at £395 some of the cheapest in the London area – while implying a misleading proximity to Hampton Court. The attraction was cheap, low-lying land near the London reservoirs and quite remote from transport links, especially the railway. Speculative land dealing and building go back a long way in the area. Much of East Molesey resulted from large scale land speculation in the 1850s by Francis Jackson Kent who saw an opportunity to make a fortune when the railway arrived at Hampton Court in 1849, quickly buying up land nearby and selling it on to wealthy individuals or developers who rapidly built on low lying former meadows that had always been flood prone. They naturally remained so until the 1960s when the nearby River Mole was rechannelled after a hugely expensive flood. Pictures of the East Molesey area and Hampton Court station environs (on the opposite bank to the Palace) in flood conditions recur in 19th and 20th centuries.

Molesey and adjacent areas of Esher, Walton and Hersham also have a significant amount of former council housing constructed by the predecessors to Elmbridge Council. There are also areas of post-war system built housing, thought to be of the concrete sectional type, built at the time of housing shortage in the years after World War 2 including on the West Molesey/East Molesey border. It was at one time home to the well-known company Roberts Radio who built a factory there in 1962.

== Transport ==
=== Railway ===
The railway station in East Molesey is Hampton Court, in Transport for London's Zone 6. This is the terminus of a stopping commuter service to London Waterloo that takes around thirty-five minutes. Principal stops are Surbiton, Wimbledon and Clapham Junction. Services are operated by South Western Railway.

During the Hampton Court Garden Festival, extra trains run to and from London.

=== Buses ===
Four bus routes serve the district:

- Eastbound: London Buses route 411 is operated by London United. The short route begins at Central Avenue in West Molesey and runs through East Molesey, past Hampton Court station and on to Kingston town centre.
- North-eastbound: East Molesey's northern point by its station, shopping parade and small riverside park is the terminus of a second Transport for London bus service, route R68, operated by Transport UK London Bus. The route begins at Hampton Court station and runs through Hampton, Hampton Hill, Teddington, Strawberry Hill, Twickenham and Richmond, before ending at Kew retail park.
- Westbound: Route 461, operated by Falcon Buses on behalf of Surrey County Council, runs from Kingston, through Molesey and on to Walton, terminating at Tesco, Addlestone.
- Southbound: Route 514, also operated by Falcon on behalf of Surrey County Council, runs from Hersham to Kingston via Molesey, Thames Ditton, Long Ditton and Surbiton.

== Demography and housing ==
2011 Census Homes
Output area	Detached	Semi-detached	Terraced	Flats and apartments	Caravans/temporary/mobile homes	Shared between households
East (ward)	909	677	334	753	1	11
North (ward)	454	879	818	358	0	0
South (ward)	247	1,113	867	595	0	2

The average level of accommodation in the region composed of detached houses was 28%, the average that was apartments was 22.6%.

2011 Census Key Statistics
Output area	Population	Households	% Owned outright	% Owned with a loan	hectares
East (ward)	6,337	2,685	38	40	298
North (ward)	6,008	2,509	37	41	164
South (ward)	6,743	2,824	27	41	125

The proportion of households in the settlement who owned their home outright compares to the regional average of 35.1 per cent. The proportion who owned their home with a loan compares to the regional average of 32.5 per cent. The remaining segment is made up of rented dwellings (plus a negligible per cent of households living rent-free).

There is a locally moored boat, the West Molesey houseboat, which is moored on the river Thames.

== Crime ==
Surrey Police statistics for reported crime in the West Molesey area for the period October 2021 to September 2022 recorded violence and sexual crime as the biggest single category with 328 instances, with anti-social behaviour having 180 instances and criminal damage and arson ranked third with 74. 31 burglaries were recorded, with 42 vehicle crimes.

There were two murders in West Molesey in 2016–2017. A woman was found murdered with a machete or axe in the front garden of her house on Walton Road, Molesey in March 2016, resulting in extensive national publicity. Police launched a second local murder investigation on 7 December 2017 when a woman reported as previously deliberately run down in the small hours of the morning in a car park on land between Hurst Road, Molesham Way and Walton Road, died in hospital.

== Sport ==
Molesey was once the bare-knuckle boxing centre of England, and had a famous horse-racing track stretching the length of the River Thames from where Hurst Park School now stands, down to Molesey Lock. The course closed in 1962, and much of it was built on in the 1960s; the Hurst Park Estate has a mixture of three and two-storey homes and a block of flats overlooking the river.

Part of the open space that was part of the racetrack is now a riverside park. There is a wide grass expanse, a playground and open access to the Thames; features here include the Hampton Ferry and Molesey Regatta, a major event in the sport of rowing with catering and evening outdoor music. There are some large iron gates in the access road to Hurst Park called Graburn Way which were built so that horse races then started just east of the road and enabled the course to have a 'straight mile'.

=== Cricket ===
'Moulsey Hurst' is a very early site of cricket (from 1731) and that tradition is continued to this day by East Molesey Cricket Club, which is located alongside the South bank of the Thames, one-half mile (0.80 km) from Hampton Court Palace. It was founded in 1871.

The club's first XI play in Surrey Championship Premier Division and there are four other senior Saturday league sides and two u21 Sunday league side, regularly competing against other Surrey clubs. The first recorded Leg Before Wicket (LBW) dismissal in first class cricket is said to have been given in a game between an XI of Surrey and a XIII of England at this site in 1795. Prior to this date there had been several attempts to formulate a law that would stop batsmen simply obstructing their wicket with their leg pads to prevent being bowled. The LBW law has been revised several times since then.

=== Rowing ===
Molesey Boat Club (established 1866) is home to some Olympic and World Championship medallists and domestic success at all ages, particularly in its adult crews. The rowing club also competes in the Amateur Molesey Regatta held annually in Hurst Park

=== Football ===
Molesey F.C. is a non-league football team based in West Molesey. The club is currently a member of the Isthmian League and play at the Herds Renault Stadium, Walton Road. The original football club was established by former Corinthian player James Jenkinson Knox in Autumn 1892 under the name Hampton Court and East Molesey Association Football Club. Their first match was played on 24 September 1892 against Barnes. In 1946 Molesey United and West Molesey Old Boys merged to form Molesey Football Club. The new club joined the Surrey Intermediate League and won the league in their first season.

Metropolitan Police F.C. is a non-league football team based in East Molesey and are based at the Imber Court Sports Ground.

AFC Molesey is a former non-league football team that was also based in West Molesey, a member of the Surrey County Intermediate League (Western) Division One and played at the West Molesey Recreation Ground, Walton Road.

=== Swimming ===
Hurst swimming pool is in Dunstall Way in the north of Molesey.

=== Cycling ===
In 2012, Bradley Wiggins won the Olympic Time Trial event. The course passed through East and West Molesey and Hurst Park, and the event finish was at Hampton Court Palace, in the post town of East Molesey.

The Surrey Classic Cycle race previously passed East and West Molesey and Hurst Park yearly.

National Cycle Network route #4 passes along the River Thames towpath through Molesey.

== Notable residents ==
- Alfie Gilchrist, Chelsea Footballer grew up in West Molesey, his family were all season ticket holders at Chelsea. Went to school at Esher High School
- Dominic Wood, English magician and presenter
- Ray Lewington, football manager and former player
- Chemmy Alcott, British Olympic alpine skier
- Rick Astley, British pop musician, lives in East Molesey
- Mick Avory, drummer and percussionist for rock band The Kinks, grew up in West Molesey
- Keith Barron, actor, lived in the town from the 1970s to 2017
- Ed Bishop, actor, lived in West Molesey
- Liv Boeree, professional poker player, lives in East Molesey
- Ronald Brooks (1899–1980), first-class cricketer and British Army officer
- Cottie Arthur Burland (1905–1983), head of ethnography at British Museum
- Bernie Constable (1921–1997), cricketer, brother of the below
- Dennis Constable (1925–2011), cricketer, brother of the above
- Bill Cotton, the television producer and executive and the son of big-band leader Billy Cotton, lived in East Molesey in his later years
- Terence Cuneo (1907–1996), artist lived for many years in East Molesey and is commemorated by a blue plaque on the site of his former home and studio in Ember Lane.
- Hazell Dean, pop music singer, lives in the town
- Geoffrey Durham, magician known as "The Great Soprendo", was born in East Molesey
- Bob Falconer (born 1962), of East Molesey, a former English cricketer
- Kenneth Falconer, mathematician, resident in the 1960s
- Ray Galton comedy dramatist, most notable for Hancock's Half Hour and Steptoe and Son
- Marius Goring, actor
- Herbert "Barry" Hart (1894–1954), sculptor and stone carver, died at 2 Walton Road, East Molesey
- Roy Holder, actor
- George Isaacs, politician
- Jentina, British rapper
- Eric Lyons, architect
- Lee Mack, stand-up comic, lives in East Molesey
- Joseph Palmer (1756–1815) was an English writer who is buried at St Peter's church, West Molesey.
- Howard Parkes (1877–1920), cricketer, buried at Molesey Cemetery, West Molesey
- John Orlando Parry (1810–1879), 19th century entertainer
- Daniel Pemberton, musician
- Luke Shaw, professional footballer, grew up in West Molesey and played for Molesey Juniors FC
- Alfred Sisley (1839–1899), Anglo-French impressionist painter, resided in East Molesey in 1874, executing nearly twenty paintings of the Upper Thames
- Steve Steen, actor, lives in East Molesey
- Les Strong, professional footballer who played for Crystal Palace and Fulham
- Michael Underwood, the physician who first described polio, was born in West Molesey
- Julius Vogel (1835–1899), Prime Minister of New Zealand, resident in East Molesey in his final years
- Matt Willis, the musician, TV presenter and ex-actor, who is best known for being the bassist in Busted, lived in Molesey during his youth
- Freya Wilson, actress
- Bridget St John, singer-songwriter, was born in East Molesey
- India Amarteifio, Actress, known for being in Queen Charlotte a bridgerton story and brudgerton
