= Ryan Johnson (footballer, born 1996) =

Northern Irish-English footballer (born 1996)

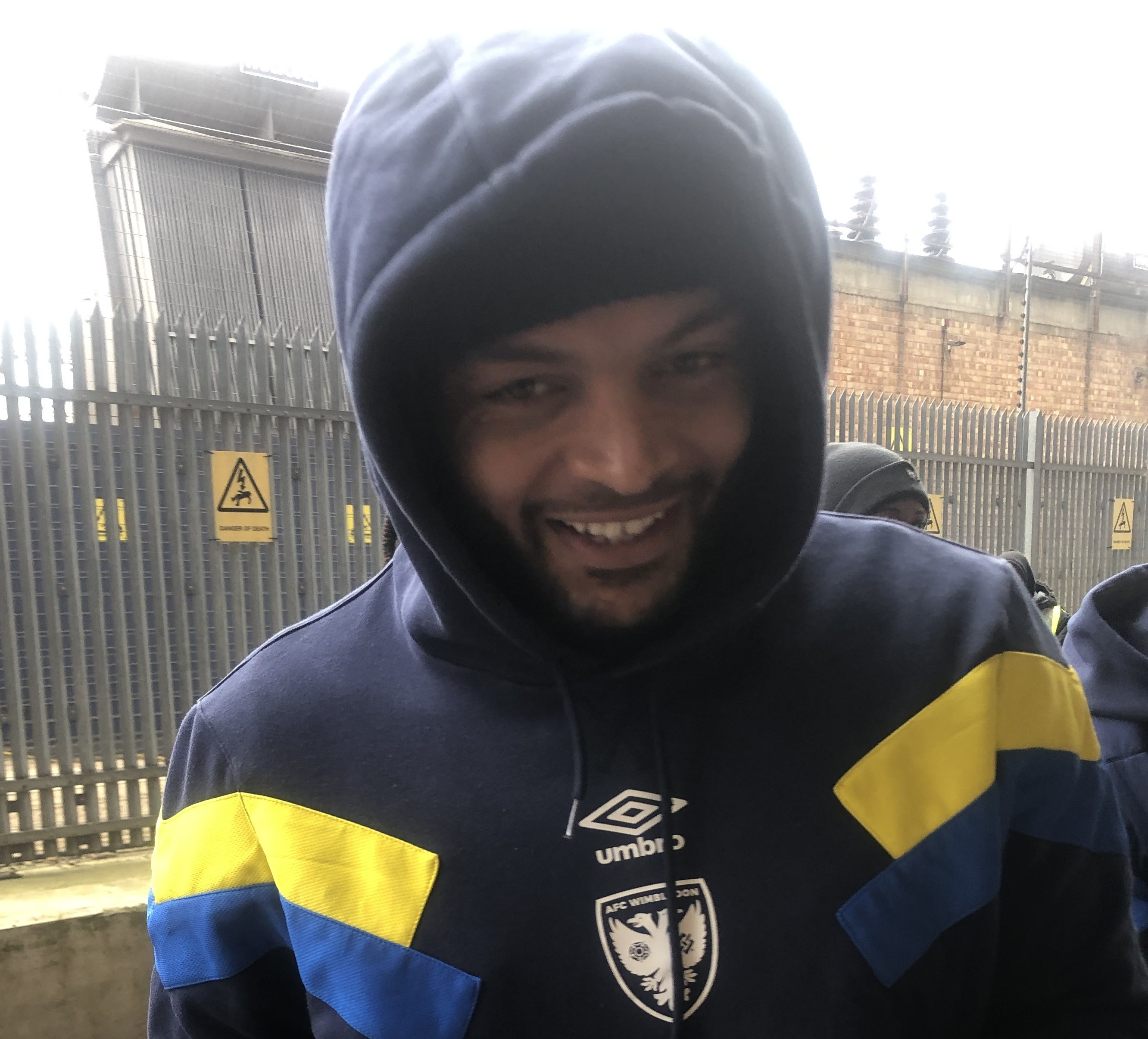
- Johnson in 2025

Personal information
- Full name: Ryan Anthony Johnson
- Date of birth: 2 October 1996 (age 30)
- Place of birth: Birmingham, England
- Height: 6 ft 2 in (1.88 m)
- Position: Defender

Team information
- Current team: AFC Wimbledon
- Number: 6

Youth career
- 2006–2013: West Bromwich Albion
- 2013–2014: Stevenage

Senior career*
Years	Team	Apps	(Gls)
2014–2019	Stevenage	13	(0)
2014	→ Boreham Wood (loan)	1	(0)
2016	→ St Albans City (loan)	12	(2)
2017–2018	→ Boreham Wood (loan)	2	(0)
2018	→ Nuneaton Town (loan)	19	(0)
2018–2019	→ Kidderminster Harriers (loan)	19	(0)
2019–2020	Kidderminster Harriers	44	(2)
2020	Rushall Olympic	1	(0)
2020–2021	Hartlepool United	33	(5)
2021–2022	Port Vale	4	(0)
2022–2023	Stockport County	49	(3)
2023–	AFC Wimbledon	123	(5)

International career
2015–2018	Northern Ireland U21	14	(2)
- * Club domestic league appearances and goals as of 1 November 2026 (UTC)

Ryan Anthony Johnson (born 2 October 1996) is a professional footballer who plays as a defender for EFL League One club AFC Wimbledon. He has also represented Northern Ireland at under-21 level.

Johnson began his career in the youth academy at West Bromwich Albion before joining Stevenage of League One in 2013. He made his first-team debut in May 2014, becoming the club's youngest player in the English Football League. During his time at Stevenage, he had two separate loan spells at Boreham Wood, and also spent time on loan with St Albans City, Nuneaton Town, and Kidderminster Harriers. He signed for Kidderminster on a permanent basis in January 2019 and spent the next year-and-a-half playing regularly in the National League North.

Following a brief spell at Rushall Olympic, where he made a single appearance, Johnson signed for Hartlepool United in September 2020. He was part of the Hartlepool team that secured promotion to the Football League via the play-offs at the end of the 2020–21 season. Johnson signed for League Two club Port Vale in June 2021, before moving to Stockport County for an undisclosed fee in January 2022. He helped Stockport win the National League title at the end of the 2021–22 season. He signed for AFC Wimbledon in June 2023 and helped the club achieve promotion by winning the 2025 League Two play-off final.

== Club career ==
=== Stevenage ===
Johnson began his career in the youth academy at West Bromwich Albion, where he spent seven years as a schoolboy. He was offered a scholarship in the summer of 2013 but opted to join Stevenage instead, believing it would be a better pathway to first-team football. Upon joining Stevenage, he trained regularly with the senior squad while beginning a two-year scholarship. Johnson made his professional debut on the final day of the 2013–14 season, appearing as a substitute in a 2–0 away defeat to Brentford on 3 May 2014. Aged 17 years and 215 days, he became Stevenage's youngest Football League debutant at the time, a record later surpassed by Liam Smyth in October 2018.

==== Loan spells ====
All four of Johnson's appearances for Stevenage during the 2014–15 season came in the opening two months of the season. This included receiving a red card for two bookable offences within the space of six minutes in a 2–1 away defeat to Bury on 16 September 2014. A month later, he joined Conference South club Boreham Wood on a one-month loan on 24 October 2014 in order to gain first-team experience. He made one appearance during the brief spell, as a 90th-minute substitute in a 2–1 victory over Maidenhead United on 10 November 2014. He returned to Stevenage later that month and played for the club's development squad for the remainder of the season. The 2015–16 season followed a similar course with Johnson appearing regularly in the match-day squad, but often as an unused substitute, as he made seven appearances for the club during the season.

Ahead of the 2016–17 season, Johnson joined National League South club St Albans City on loan, alongside teammate Dipo Akinyemi, in a deal running until January 2017. The move followed a request for more first-team football, which he discussed with Stevenage manager Darren Sarll. Johnson scored his first competitive goal in St Albans' 2–1 victory over Chelmsford City on 16 August 2016, scoring with a header from a corner kick. He sustained a knee injury while on international duty with the Northern Ireland under-21 team in September 2016, sidelining him for two months. He returned in early December and was recalled by Stevenage later that month, a month earlier than planned. Johnson made 12 appearances for St Albans, scoring twice. In April 2017, he spent a week on trial spells with Tottenham Hotspur and Norwich City, playing in under-23 fixtures for both clubs.

Despite reported interest from Premier League and Championship clubs, Johnson remained at Stevenage and rejoined Boreham Wood on a season-long loan agreement in July 2017. After starting two of the club's first three matches, Johnson did not feature again and the loan was ended in December 2017. He subsequently joined National League North club Nuneaton Town on loan for the remainder of the season on 5 January 2018, reuniting with manager Dino Maamria, who had coached him at Stevenage. Johnson made his Nuneaton debut in a 2–0 loss to Brackley Town on 6 January 2018. He was a mainstay in central defence during his time at Nuneaton, making 19 appearances.

=== Kidderminster ===
Johnson was loaned out for a fifth time in June 2018, joining National League North club Kidderminster Harriers on a six-month deal. He made his Kidderminster debut on the opening day of the 2018–19 season, playing the full match in a 3–3 draw away at Alfreton Town. He made 19 league appearances before signing permanently on 4 January 2019 for an undisclosed fee, with Stevenage inserting a "significant sell-on fee" into the transfer. Johnson scored his first goal for the club in a 4–1 victory against Chester on 9 February 2019, and made 36 appearances as Kidderminster finished 10th in National League North. Johnson played 30 times during the 2019–20 season, scoring one goal, in a season that was curtailed by the COVID-19 pandemic in March 2020.

=== Hartlepool United ===
Without a club at the start of the 2020–21 season, Johnson played one match on non-contract terms for Southern League Premier Division Central club Rushall Olympic. He then joined National League club Hartlepool United following a successful trial, signing a short-term contract on 29 September 2020. He scored the winning goal on his debut in a 2–1 victory against Chesterfield on 6 October 2020. After scoring twice in his first four appearances, his contract was extended on 30 October 2020. Johnson signed a further contract extension on 22 January 2021, with the new agreement running for the remainder of the 2020–21 season. Johnson made 39 appearances and scored five goals as Hartlepool earned promotion to the Football League after defeating Torquay United on penalties in the 2021 National League play-off final. He left Hartlepool at the end of the season after receiving an offer the club said they could not match.

=== Port Vale ===
Out of contract upon the conclusion of the promotion-winning season at Hartlepool, Johnson signed for fellow League Two club Port Vale on a two-year contract on 27 June 2021. Port Vale manager Darrell Clarke described him as a "powerful left footed centre-half" with further potential. Johnson found first-team opportunities limited in the first half of the 2021–22 season, starting three league matches and making eight appearances in all competitions during his time there.

=== Stockport County ===
Johnson joined National League club Stockport County for an undisclosed fee on 6 January 2022, reuniting with former Hartlepool manager Dave Challinor. Port Vale director of football David Flitcroft confirmed the transfer included add-on clauses. He made his debut for Stockport five days later in a 4–1 victory at Altrincham and scored his first goal in a 3–0 FA Trophy victory against Larkhall Athletic on 15 January 2022. He made 23 appearances in the second half of the 2021–22 season as Stockport returned to the Football League as champions of the National League. He played 33 times during the 2022–23 season, though did not feature in the play-offs. Following play-off final defeat, he was released by the club.

=== AFC Wimbledon ===
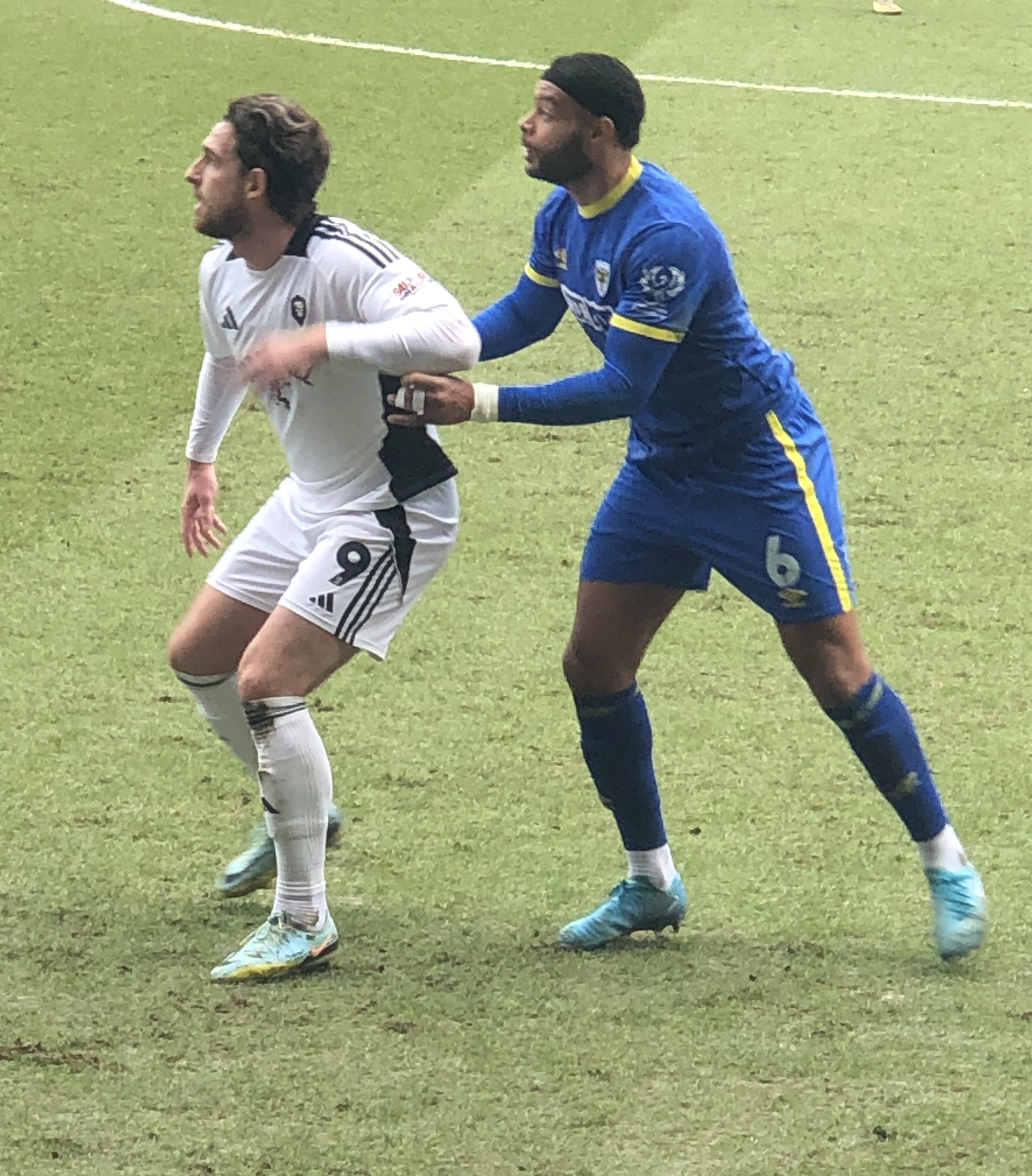
Ryan Johnson marking Cole Stockton in 2025.

Johnson signed a two-year contract with fellow League Two club AFC Wimbledon on 26 June 2023, with the head of football operations Craig Cope describing him as "a real physical presence at the back". He scored his first goal for Wimbledon with a header in a 3–0 win at Sutton United on 19 August. He said he had a "dream start" to the 2023–24 season as he formed a central defensive partnership alongside Stockport County loanee Joe Lewis. He missed two months towards the end of the campaign with an ankle injury, making 38 appearances during his debut season at Wimbledon.

Johnson was appointed vice-captain ahead of the 2024–25 season. He did not play during September due to injury, though returned to captain the team in the absence of club captain Jake Reeves. He was nominated for the PFA League Two Fans' Player of the Month award in February 2025, having played every minute as Wimbledon conceded just one goal in six matches. He played in the 2025 EFL League Two play-off final, helping Wimbledon to secure promotion with a 1–0 victory over Walsall. Having made 49 appearances during the season, Johnson signed a new two-year contract in June 2025, with manager Johnnie Jackson describing him as "a leader within the group and an integral part of our defensive unit".

Johnson made his 100th appearance for the club in November 2025. He made 45 appearances and scored four goals during the 2025–26 season.

== International career ==
Born in England, Johnson is of Northern Irish descent through his mother. Johnson received his first call-up to represent Northern Ireland at under-21 level in September 2015, playing the full match in a 2–1 defeat to Scotland in a 2017 UEFA European under-21 Championship qualifier. He scored his first international goal three days later in a 1–1 away draw with Iceland in Reykjavík. Johnson made four appearances, scoring once, as Northern Ireland finished bottom of the qualification group. He remained a regular at centre-back during the subsequent 2019 UEFA European under-21 Championship qualifying campaign.

Johnson received his first call-up to the Northern Ireland senior team on 31 August 2025 for the World Cup qualifiers against Luxembourg and Germany.

== Style of play ==
Johnson is left-footed and has been deployed at left-back and centre-back throughout his career, although prefers to play as a centre-back. During his time at Hartlepool, he was described as a "ball-playing defender" and was utilised as the left-sided centre-back in a three-man central defence during the 2020–21 season.

== Career statistics ==
As of match played 2 May 2026

Appearances and goals by club, season and competition
Club	Season	League			FA Cup		League Cup		Other		Total	
Club	Season	Division	Apps	Goals	Apps	Goals	Apps	Goals	Apps	Goals	Apps	Goals
Stevenage	2013–14	League One	1	0	0	0	0	0	0	0	1	0
Stevenage	2014–15	League Two	4	0	—		0	0	0	0	4	0
Stevenage	2015–16	League Two	7	0	0	0	0	0	0	0	7	0
Stevenage	2016–17	League Two	0	0	0	0	0	0	0	0	0	0
Stevenage	2017–18	League Two	1	0	0	0	0	0	0	0	1	0
Stevenage	2018–19	League Two	0	0	0	0	0	0	0	0	0	0
Stevenage	Total		13	0	0	0	0	0	0	0	13	0
Boreham Wood (loan)	2014–15	Conference South	1	0	0	0	—		—		1	0
St Albans City (loan)	2016–17	National League South	12	2	—		—		1 (Note: Appearance in Herts Charity Cup)	0	13	2
Boreham Wood (loan)	2017–18	National League	2	0	—		—		—		2	0
Nuneaton Town (loan)	2017–18	National League North	19	0	—		—		—		19	0
Kidderminster Harriers	2018–19	National League North	33	1	2	0	—		1 (Note: Appearance(s) in FA Trophy)	0	36	1
Kidderminster Harriers	2019–20	National League North	30	1	0	0	—		0	0	30	1
Kidderminster Harriers	Total		63	2	2	0	0	0	1	0	66	2
Rushall Olympic	2020–21	SFL Premier Division Central	1	0	0	0	—		0	0	1	0
Hartlepool United	2020–21	National League	33	5	2	0	—		4 (Note: One appearance in FA Trophy; three appearances in 2021 National League play-offs)	0	39	5
Port Vale	2021–22	League Two	4	0	0	0	0	0	4 (Note: Appearances in EFL Trophy)	0	8	0
Stockport County	2021–22	National League	21	3	—		—		2	1	23	4
Stockport County	2022–23	League Two	28	0	0	0	2	0	3	2	33	2
Stockport County	Total		49	3	0	0	2	0	5	3	56	6
AFC Wimbledon	2023–24	League Two	31	1	2	0	2	0	3	0	38	1
AFC Wimbledon	2024–25	League Two	40	0	2	0	2	0	5 (Note: Two appearances in EFL Trophy; three appearances in 2025 League Two play-offs)	0	49	0
AFC Wimbledon	2025–26	League One	40	4	1	0	2	0	2	0	45	4
AFC Wimbledon	2026–27	League One	0	0	0	0	0	0	0	0	0	0
AFC Wimbledon	Total		111	5	5	0	6	0	10	0	132	5
Career total			308	17	9	0	8	0	25	3	350	20

== Honours ==
Hartlepool United

- National League play-offs: 2021

Stockport County

- National League: 2021–22

AFC Wimbledon

- EFL League Two play-offs: 2025
