= James Tilley (footballer) =

English footballer (born 1998)

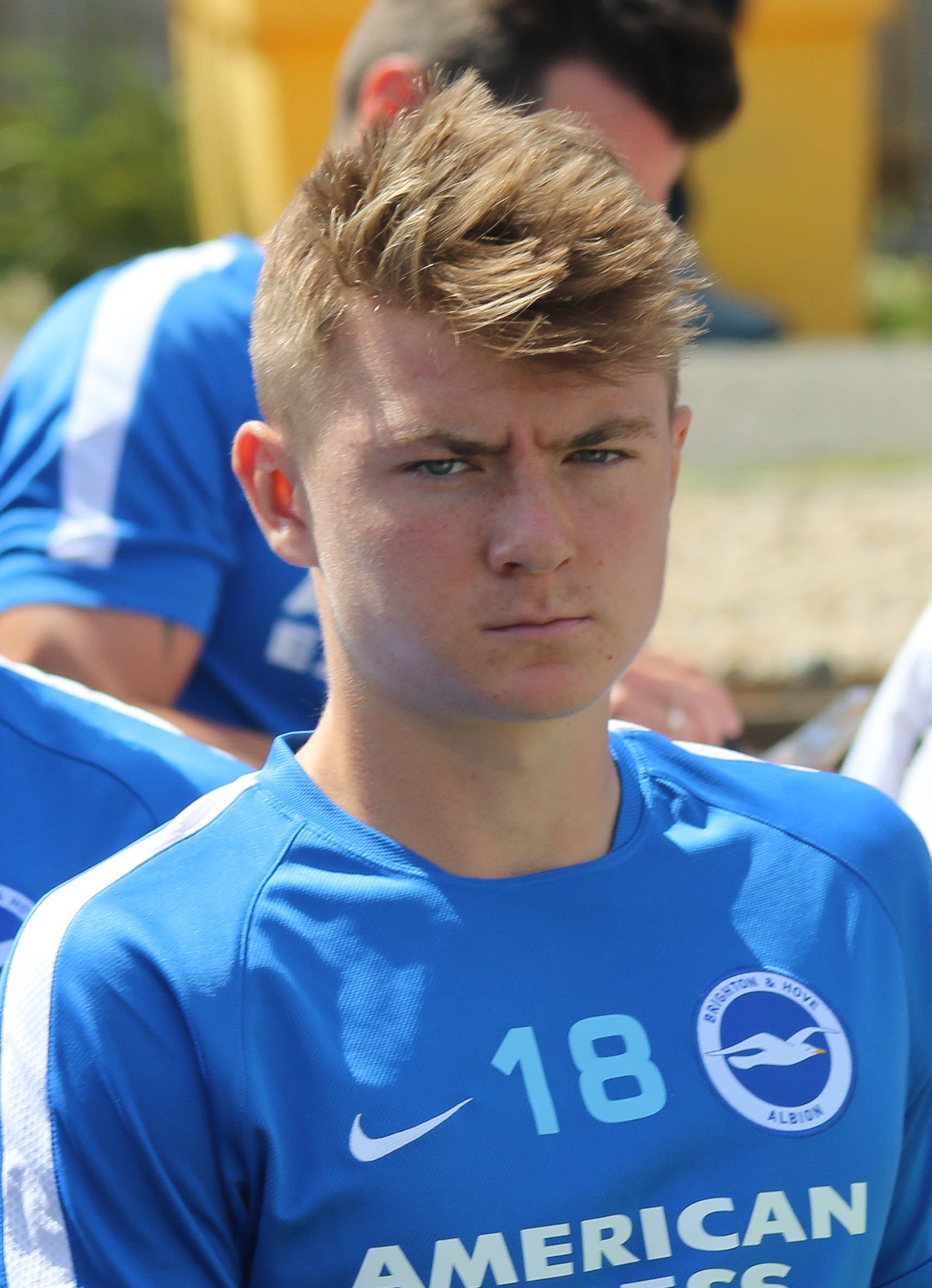
- Tilley with Brighton & Hove Albion in 2015

Personal information
- Full name: James Alexander David Tilley
- Date of birth: 13 June 1998 (age 28)
- Place of birth: Billingshurst, England
- Height: 5 ft 9 in (1.75 m)
- Positions: Forward; attacking midfielder

Team information
- Current team: AFC Wimbledon
- Number: 7

Youth career
- 2011–2015: Brighton & Hove Albion

Senior career*
Years	Team	Apps	(Gls)
2015–2020	Brighton & Hove Albion	1	(0)
2019	→ Cork City (loan)	19	(0)
2019–2020	→ Yeovil Town (loan)	19	(0)
2020–2021	Grimsby Town	24	(2)
2021–2023	Crawley Town	83	(11)
2021	→ Dorking Wanderers (loan)	2	(0)
2023–2025	AFC Wimbledon	80	(11)
2025–2026	Wycombe Wanderers	6	(1)
2026	→ AFC Wimbledon (loan)	13	(2)
2026–	AFC Wimbledon	9	(0)
- * Club domestic league appearances and goals as of 1 November 2026 (UTC)

James Alexander David Tilley (born 13 June 1998) is an English professional footballer who plays as a forward or attacking midfielder for EFL League One club AFC Wimbledon.

== Club career ==
=== Brighton & Hove Albion ===
Tilley made his debut professional appearance for Brighton on 2 May 2015, coming on as a substitute in the 95th minute for Jake Forster-Caskey, in Brighton's last game of the 2014–15 season in which they drew 0–0 away to Middlesbrough. Tilley's second appearance for Brighton came in a 2–4 League Cup victory over Oxford United in the 2016–17 season, with Tilley coming on as a substitute for Elvis Manu in the 87th minute. Tilley scored his first goal for Brighton in an EFL Cup tie against Barnet on 22 August 2017, where Brighton won 1–0 at Falmer Stadium.

==== Loan to Cork City ====
On 18 January 2019, it was confirmed that Tilley had joined League of Ireland club Cork City on a six-month loan. Tilley made his Cork City debut in the President's Cup on 9 February 2019 - Cork City lost 2–1 to Dundalk. On 15 February Tilley made his league debut for Cork City in a 1–0 away defeat against St Patrick's Athletic in the League of Ireland. Tilley scored his first goal for Cork on 1 April in a League Cup match against local side Cobh Ramblers. Opening the scoring in a 4–1 home victory to Cork. Tilley's loan spell ended with Cork sitting only just above the relegation zone.

==== Loan to Yeovil Town ====
On 2 September 2019, Tilley signed for National League side Yeovil Town on loan until the end of the season. He made his debut for The Glovers a day later, coming on as a substitute in the 1–0 home win over Sutton.

=== Grimsby Town ===
On 15 January 2020, Tilley's loan with Yeovil Town was cut short to sign permanently by Ian Holloway for League Two side Grimsby Town on an initial 18-month contract. Following a managerial change at Grimsby that saw the appointment of Paul Hurst, Tilley was substituted at half time in his Hurst's first game in charge against Cambridge United and the following week he was left out of the squad that travelled to Port Vale, with Hurst saying Tilley's absence had not been down to injury. On 14 January 2021, after a year with the club Tilley left Grimsby after his contract was terminated by mutual consent.

=== Crawley Town ===
On 15 January 2021, Tilley joined fellow League Two side Crawley Town on a two-and-a-half-year deal with the option for a further year. 15 days later he made his debut as a half time substitute away at Cambridge United in an eventual 3–1 loss. He scored his first goal for The Red Devils on 20 February on his third appearance scoring a 90+3rd minute winner in a 1–0 home victory over Colchester United.

On 31 August 2021, Tilley joined National League South club Dorking Wanderers on a 28-day loan.

He was sent off after picking up a second yellow for a late challenge on Stephen McLaughlin in Crawley's 2–0 away loss at Mansfield Town on 23 April 2022. He scored three times throughout the season including one on the last game of the season on 7 May, scoring Crawley's first equaliser taking it to 2–2 in the eventual 3–3 draw at already relegated Oldham Athletic.

=== AFC Wimbledon ===
On 22 June 2023, Tilley signed for AFC Wimbledon on a two-year deal for an undisclosed fee. During his two-year spell at AFC Wimbledon, would go on to win the League Two Play Offs, earning the club promotion into League One.

=== Wycombe Wanderers ===
On 13 June 2025, Wycombe Wanderers announced that Tilley would join them on 1 July 2025. On 20th January 2026 He Joined former club AFC Wimbledon on loan for the remainder of the season.

=== AFC Wimbledon ===
On 14th July 2026 Tilley rejoined former club AFC Wimbledon on a three year deal.

== Personal life ==
Tilley is part of a footballing family; his father is chairman of Sussex County League club Billingshurst and his eldest brother Nick has also played at County League level. Tilley is a fan of Tottenham Hotspur.

== Career statistics ==
As of match played 2 September 2026

Appearances and goals by club, season and competition
Club	Season	League			National Cup		League Cup		Other		Total	
Club	Season	Division	Apps	Goals	Apps	Goals	Apps	Goals	Apps	Goals	Apps	Goals
Brighton & Hove Albion	2014–15	Championship	1	0	0	0	0	0	—		1	0
Brighton & Hove Albion	2015–16	Championship	0	0	0	0	1	0	0	0	1	0
Brighton & Hove Albion	2016–17	Championship	0	0	0	0	1	0	—		1	0
Brighton & Hove Albion	2017–18	Premier League	0	0	0	0	1	1	—		1	1
Brighton & Hove Albion	2018–19	Premier League	0	0	0	0	0	0	—		0	0
Brighton & Hove Albion	2019–20	Premier League	0	0	0	0	0	0	—		0	0
Brighton & Hove Albion	Total		1	0	0	0	3	1	0	0	4	1
Brighton & Hove Albion U23	2016–17	—			—		—		4 (Note: Appearances in EFL Trophy)	0	4	0
Brighton & Hove Albion U23	2017–18	—			—		—		3	1	3	1
Brighton & Hove Albion U23	2018–19	—			—		—		3	0	3	0
Brighton & Hove Albion U23	Total		—		—		—		10	1	10	1
Cork City (loan)	2019	LOI Premier Division	19	0	0	0	2	1	4 (Note: One appearance in President of Ireland's Cup, three appearances and two goals in Munster Senior Cup)	2	25	3
Yeovil Town (loan)	2019–20	National League	19	0	2	0	—		2 (Note: Appearances in FA Trophy)	0	23	0
Grimsby Town	2019–20	League Two	10	0	—		0	0	0	0	10	0
Grimsby Town	2020–21	League Two	14	2	0	0	1	0	0	0	15	2
Grimsby Town	Total		24	2	0	0	1	0	0	0	25	2
Crawley Town	2020–21	League Two	18	3	0	0	—		—		18	3
Crawley Town	2021–22	League Two	30	3	0	0	1	0	2	0	33	3
Crawley Town	2022–23	League Two	35	5	0	0	0	0	3	0	38	5
Crawley Town	Total		83	11	0	0	1	0	5	0	89	11
Dorking Wanderers (loan)	2021–22	National League South	2	0	0	0	—		0	0	2	0
AFC Wimbledon	2023–24	League Two	39	7	2	2	2	1	5	2	48	12
AFC Wimbledon	2024–25	League Two	41	4	2	0	3	0	7 (Note: Four appearances and one goal in EFL Trophy, three appearances in League Two play-offs)	1	53	5
AFC Wimbledon	Total		80	11	4	2	5	1	12	3	101	17
Wycombe Wanderers	2025–26	League One	6	1	1	0	3	0	3	0	13	1
AFC Wimbledon (loan)	2025–26	League One	13	2	—		—		1	0	14	2
AFC Wimbledon	2026–27	League One	4	0	0	0	2	0	1	0	7	0
Career total			251	27	7	2	17	3	38	6	313	38

== Honours ==
Cork City

- Munster Senior Cup: 2018–19

AFC Wimbledon

- EFL League Two play-offs: 2025
