= Huseyin Biler =

English footballer (born 2002)

Personal information
- Full name: Huseyin Biler
- Date of birth: 26 February 2002 (age 24)
- Place of birth: London, England
- Position: Right-back

Team information
- Current team: İskenderunspor
- Number: 20

Youth career
- 2016–2018: Ryan FC
- 2018–2020: AFC Wimbledon

Senior career*
Years	Team	Apps	(Gls)
2020–2025	AFC Wimbledon	30	(0)
2020	→ Hendon (loan)	1	(0)
2021	→ Welling United (loan)	3	(0)
2022	→ Merstham (loan)	17	(0)
2025	Mardin 1969 SK	0	(0)
2025–	İskenderunspor	24	(0)
- * Club domestic league appearances and goals as of 3 March 2026

Huseyin Biler (born 26 February 2002) is an English professional footballer who plays as a right-back for TFF 2. Lig club İskenderunspor.

== Career ==
Biler started his career with Waltham Forest-based grassroots side Ryan FC. He later joined AFC Wimbledon and signed his first professional contract with the club in July 2020.

On 15 October 2020, he joined Hendon on a one month loan deal. He made just one league appearance as a substitute in the 1–0 away loss to Poole Town on 17 October 2020.

Biler made his professional debut for Wimbledon in the EFL Trophy away loss to Oxford United on 2 February 2021.

On 18 February 2021, Biler joined National League South side Tonbridge Angels ahead of the planned resumption of their season, however due to the COVID-19 pandemic the season was not resumed and he did not make an appearance.

On 13 August 2021, Biler signed for National League South side Welling United on a season-long loan deal. However, the loan spell was cut short due to injury and he returned to Wimbledon after only three league appearances.

On 15 January 2022, Biler joined Merstham on loan until the end of the season.

Biler made his full league debut for Wimbledon on 19 November 2022 in a 2–0 away win against Tranmere Rovers and enjoyed a run of first team games until incurring a hamstring injury in early February 2023.

Biler departed the Wombles upon the expiry of his contract at the end of the 2024–25 season.

In July 2025, Biler joined newly promoted TFF 2. Lig club Mardin 1969 SK on a two-year deal. However, three weeks later, he was announced as a signing for fellow third-tier side İskenderunspor.

== Personal life ==
Born in London, Biler's family are from Cyprus. His twin brother Ahmet also plays football and joined İskenderunspor in 2024.

== Career statistics ==
As of end of 2024–25 season

Appearances and goals by club, season and competition
Club	Season	League			FA Cup		League Cup		Other		Total	
Club	Season	Division	Apps	Goals	Apps	Goals	Apps	Goals	Apps	Goals	Apps	Goals
AFC Wimbledon	2020–21	League One	0	0	0	0	0	0	1 (Note: Appearances in EFL Trophy)	0	1	0
AFC Wimbledon	2021–22	League One	0	0	0	0	0	0	1	0	1	0
AFC Wimbledon	2022–23	League Two	13	0	2	0	0	0	2	0	17	0
AFC Wimbledon	2023–24	League Two	11	0	3	0	0	0	5	0	19	0
AFC Wimbledon	2024–25	League Two	6	0	1	0	3	0	4	0	14	0
AFC Wimbledon	Total		30	0	6	0	3	0	13	0	52	0
Career total			30	0	6	0	3	0	13	0	52	0
