= 2023–24 AFC Wimbledon season =

22nd season in existence of AFC Wimbledon

AFC Wimbledon
2023–24 season
- Owner: The Dons Trust
- Manager: Johnnie Jackson
- Stadium: Plough Lane
- League Two: 10th
- FA Cup: Third round
- EFL Cup: Second round
- EFL Trophy: Quarter-finals
- Top goalscorer: League: Ali Al-Hamadi (13); All: Ali Al-Hamadi (17)

The 2023–24 season was the 22nd season in the history of AFC Wimbledon and their second consecutive season in League Two. The club participated in League Two, the FA Cup, the EFL Cup, and the 2023–24 EFL Trophy.

== Current squad ==
As of 20 February 2024

| No. | Name | Position | Nationality | Place of birth | Date of birth (age) | Previous club | Date signed | Fee | Contract end |
Goalkeepers
| 1 | Nik Tzanev | GK | (New Zealand) | Wellington | 23 December 1996 (age 29) | Brentford | 1 July 2016 | Free | 30 June 2024 |
| 12 | Alex Bass | GK | (England) | Eastleigh | 1 April 1998 (age 28) | Sunderland | 12 July 2023 | Loan | 31 May 2024 |
Defenders
| 2 | Huseyin Biler | RB | (England) | London | 26 February 2002 (age 24) | Academy | 1 July 2020 | Trainee | 30 June 2024 |
| 3 | Lee Brown | LB | (England) | Farnborough | 10 August 1990 (age 36) | Portsmouth | 28 January 2022 | Undisclosed | 30 June 2024 |
| 5 | Kofi Balmer | CB | (Northern Ireland) | Newtownabbey | 19 September 2000 (age 26) | Crystal Palace | 31 January 2024 | Loan | 31 May 2024 |
| 6 | Ryan Johnson | CB | (Northern Ireland) | (England) Birmingham | 2 October 1996 (age 30) | Stockport County | 1 July 2023 | Free | 30 June 2025 |
| 15 | Alex Pearce | CB | (Republic of Ireland) | (England) Oxford | 9 November 1988 (age 38) | Millwall | 1 July 2022 | Free | 30 June 2024 |
| 19 | John-Joe O'Toole | CB | (Republic of Ireland) | (England) Harrow | 30 September 1988 (age 38) | Mansfield Town | 1 February 2024 | Loan | 31 May 2024 |
| 23 | Josh Hallard | LB | (England) | Crawley | 31 October 2003 (age 23) | Academy | 1 July 2023 | Trainee | 30 June 2024 |
| 25 | Ethan Sutcliffe | CB | (England) | Stretham | 20 February 2004 (age 22) | Academy | 1 July 2023 | Trainee | 30 June 2024 |
| 26 | Jack Currie | LB | (England) | Kingston upon Thames | 16 December 2001 (age 24) | Academy | 1 July 2020 | Trainee | 30 June 2024 |
| 30 | Paul Kalambayi | CB | (England) | Dulwich | 9 July 1999 (age 27) | Academy | 1 July 2017 | Trainee | 30 June 2024 |
| 31 | Joe Lewis | CB | (Wales) | Neath | 20 September 1999 (age 27) | Stockport County | 10 January 2024 | Undisclosed | 30 June 2026 |
| 33 | Isaac Ogundere | CB | (England) | Hillingdon | 6 November 2002 (age 24) | Academy | 1 July 2021 | Trainee | 30 June 2025 |
Midfielders
| 4 | Jake Reeves | CM | (England) | Lewisham | 30 May 1993 (age 33) | Stevenage | 1 July 2023 | Free | 30 June 2025 |
| 8 | Harry Pell | CM | (England) | Tilbury | 21 October 1991 (age 35) | Accrington Stanley | 24 August 2022 | Undisclosed | 30 June 2024 |
| 14 | Armani Little | CM | (England) | Portsmouth | 5 April 1997 (age 29) | Forest Green Rovers | 6 July 2023 | Undisclosed | 30 June 2024 |
| 16 | James Ball | CM | (England) | Bolton | 1 December 1995 (age 30) | Rochdale | 24 July 2023 | Free | 30 June 2025 |
| 27 | Morgan Williams | AM | (Wales) | (England) London | 11 December 2004 (age 21) | Academy | 1 July 2023 | Trainee | 30 June 2025 |
| 28 | Marcel Campbell | AM | (England) | Carshalton | 15 May 2004 (age 22) | Academy | 1 July 2023 | Trainee | 30 June 2024 |
| 32 | Kai Jennings | CM | (England) | | | Academy | 5 September 2023 | Trainee | 30 June 2024 |
| 35 | Junior Nkeng | CM | (Spain) | Barcelona | | Academy | 11 November 2023 | Trainee | 30 June 2024 |
Forwards
| 7 | James Tilley | RW | (England) | Billingshurst | 13 June 1998 (age 28) | Crawley Town | 22 June 2023 | Undisclosed | 30 June 2025 |
| 9 | Josh Davison | CF | (England) | Enfield | 16 September 1999 (age 27) | Charlton Athletic | 18 July 2022 | Undisclosed | 30 June 2024 |
| 10 | Josh Kelly | CF | (England) | Windsor | 19 December 1998 (age 27) | Solihull Moors | 1 February 2024 | Undisclosed | 30 June 2026 |
| 11 | Josh Neufville | RW | (England) | Luton | 22 March 2001 (age 25) | Luton Town | 1 July 2023 | Free | 30 June 2025 |
| 17 | Ryan McLean | LW | (England) | Shrewsbury | 3 May 2000 (age 26) | Hereford | 22 June 2023 | Undisclosed | 30 June 2025 |
| 18 | Omar Bugiel | CF | (Lebanon) | (Germany) Berlin | 3 January 1994 (age 32) | Sutton United | 1 July 2023 | Free | 30 June 2024 |
| 24 | Ronan Curtis | LW | (Republic of Ireland) | (England) London | 29 March 1996 (age 30) | Portsmouth | 19 January 2024 | Free | 30 June 2024 |
| 29 | Aron Sasu | CF | (Norway) | (England) Croydon | 5 March 2005 (age 21) | Academy | 1 July 2023 | Trainee | 30 June 2024 |
| 38 | John-Kymani Gordon | CF | (England) | Croydon | 13 February 2003 (age 23) | Crystal Palace | 17 January 2024 | Loan | 31 May 2024 |
Out on Loan
| 20 | Quaine Bartley | CF | (England) | Whittington | 28 October 2003 (age 23) | Academy | 1 July 2023 | Trainee | 30 June 2024 |
| 21 | Paris Lock | CF | (England) | London | 18 October 2004 (age 22) | Academy | 1 July 2023 | Trainee | 30 June 2024 |
| 22 | Ben Mason | RB | (Republic of Ireland) | (England) Chertsey | 19 December 2003 (age 22) | Academy | 1 July 2023 | Trainee | 30 June 2024 |
| —N/a | Will Nightingale | CB | (England) | Wandsworth | 2 August 1995 (age 31) | Academy | 1 July 2014 | Trainee | 30 June 2024 |
| —N/a | Zach Robinson | CF | (England) | London | 11 June 2002 (age 24) | Academy | 1 July 2020 | Trainee | 30 June 2024 |

== Transfers ==
=== In ===
| Date | Pos | Player | Transferred from | Fee | Ref |
|---|---|---|---|---|---|
| 22 June 2023 | LW | (England) Ryan McLean | (England) Hereford | Undisclosed | |
| 22 June 2023 | RW | (England) James Tilley | (England) Crawley Town | Undisclosed | |
| 1 July 2023 | CF | (Lebanon) Omar Bugiel | (England) Sutton United | Free Transfer | |
| 1 July 2023 | CB | (Northern Ireland) Ryan Johnson | (England) Stockport County | Free Transfer | |
| 1 July 2023 | RW | (England) Josh Neufville | (England) Luton Town | Free Transfer | |
| 1 July 2023 | CM | (England) Jake Reeves | (England) Stevenage | Free Transfer | |
| 6 July 2023 | CM | (England) Armani Little | (England) Forest Green Rovers | Undisclosed | |
| 24 July 2023 | CM | (England) James Ball | (England) Rochdale | Free Transfer | |
| 13 October 2023 | GK | (England) Ryan Sandford | Free agent | —N/a | |
| 10 January 2024 | CB | (Wales) Joe Lewis | (England) Stockport County | Undisclosed | |
| 19 January 2024 | LW | (Republic of Ireland) Ronan Curtis | Free agent | —N/a | |
| 1 February 2024 | CF | (England) Josh Kelly | (England) Solihull Moors | Undisclosed | |

=== Out ===
| Date | Pos | Player | Transferred to | Fee | Ref |
|---|---|---|---|---|---|
| 30 June 2023 | MF | (England) Dylan Adjei-Hersey | (England) Enfield Town | Released | |
| 30 June 2023 | DM | (England) Elliott Bolton | Free agent | Released | |
| 30 June 2023 | AM | (South Africa) Ethan Chislett | (England) Port Vale | End of Contract | |
| 30 June 2023 | CF | (England) Aaron Cosgrave | (England) FC Halifax Town | Released | |
| 30 June 2023 | CF | (England) David Fisher | (Northern Ireland) Glentoran | Released | |
| 30 June 2023 | CM | (England) Kwaku Frimpong | (England) Carshalton Athletic | Released | |
| 30 June 2023 | RB | (Wales) Chris Gunter | Retired | | |
| 30 June 2023 | CB | (England) Luke Jenkins | (England) Chelmsford City | Released | |
| 30 June 2023 | CF | (England) David Kawa | (England) Peterborough United | Undisclosed | |
| 30 June 2023 | DM | (England) George Marsh | (Cyprus) AEL Limassol | Released | |
| 30 June 2023 | CB | (Grenada) Aaron Pierre | (England) Shrewsbury Town | End of Contract | |
| 30 June 2023 | CF | (Netherlands) Obed Yeboah | (England) Truro City | Free Transfer | |
| 26 July 2023 | CM | (England) Alex Woodyard | (England) York City | Free Transfer | |
| 9 August 2023 | CM | (England) Alfie Bendle | (England) Forest Green Rovers | Free Transfer | |
| 21 August 2023 | GK | (England) Nathan Broome | (Wales) Swansea City | Mutual Consent | |
| 29 January 2024 | CF | (Iraq) Ali Al-Hamadi | (England) Ipswich Town | Undisclosed | |

=== Loaned in ===
| Date | Pos | Player | Loaned from | Date until | Ref |
|---|---|---|---|---|---|
| 1 July 2023 | CB | (Wales) Joe Lewis | (England) Stockport County | 10 January 2024 (Note: On 10 January, Lewis joined the club from Stockport on a permanent basis.) | |
| 12 July 2023 | GK | (England) Alex Bass | (England) Sunderland | End of Season | |
| 1 September 2023 | CM | (England) Charlie Lakin | (England) Burton Albion | 1 January 2024 | |
| 1 September 2023 | AM | (Wales) Connor Lemonheigh-Evans | (England) Stockport County | 10 January 2024 (Note: On 10 January, Lemonheigh-Evans was recalled back to Stockport early.) | |
| 17 January 2024 | CF | (England) John-Kymani Gordon | (England) Crystal Palace | End of Season | |
| 31 January 2024 | CB | (Northern Ireland) Kofi Balmer | (England) Crystal Palace | End of Season | |
| 1 February 2024 | CB | (Republic of Ireland) John-Joe O'Toole | (England) Mansfield Town | End of Season | |

=== Loaned out ===
| Date | Pos | Player | Loaned to | Date until | Ref |
|---|---|---|---|---|---|
| 1 July 2023 | CF | (England) Zach Robinson | (Scotland) Dundee | End of Season | |
| 8 July 2023 | CF | (England) Quaine Bartley | (England) King's Lynn Town | End of Season | |
| 18 July 2023 | CB | (England) Will Nightingale | (Scotland) Ross County | End of Season (Note: On 8 January, Nightingale's loan at Ross County was extended until the end of season.) | |
| 1 September 2023 | RB | (Republic of Ireland) Ben Mason | (England) Braintree Town | 1 January 2024 | |
| 22 September 2023 | CB | (England) Ethan Sutcliffe | (England) King's Lynn Town | 21 October 2023 | |
| 6 October 2023 | AM | (Wales) Morgan Williams | (England) Woking | 4 November 2023 | |
| 24 October 2023 | LW | (England) Ryan McLean | (England) Kidderminster Harriers | 1 January 2024 | |
| 24 October 2023 | CB | (England) Ethan Sutcliffe | (England) Tonbridge Angels | 21 November 2023 | |
| 1 January 2024 | CF | (England) Paris Lock | (England) Tonbridge Angels | End of Season | |
| 16 January 2024 | RB | (Republic of Ireland) Ben Mason | (England) Farnborough | End of Season | |

== Pre-season and friendlies ==
On May 15, Wimbledon announced a pre-season tour to Alicante in Spain for a six-day warm-weather training camp. Two days later, the first match was confirmed, against Woking. A home friendly, against Portsmouth was also added to the pre-season calendar. A third friendly opposition was confirmed, in Queens Park Rangers visiting. During the clubs stay in Alicante, it was revealed a fixture would be played against Reading. A fifth fixture was confirmed in late June, against Southend United.

Win Draw Loss Fixtures

| 8 July 2023 Friendly | AFC Wimbledon | 1–0 | Reading | La Nucia, Spain |
| 11:00 CEST; 10:00 BST | Neufville 45+2' | | | Stadium: Estadi Olímpic Camilo Cano |

| 12 July 2023 Friendly | Metropolitan Police | 0–4 | AFC Wimbledon | Molesey |
| 19:45 BST | | Report | Lock; Davison (pen.); Reeves; Neufville | Stadium: Imber Court |

| 15 July 2023 Friendly | Woking | 0–0 | AFC Wimbledon | Woking |
| 12:00 BST | | Report | | Stadium: Kingfield Stadium |

| 22 July 2023 Friendly | AFC Wimbledon | 1–1 | Queens Park Rangers | Wimbledon |
| 15:00 BST | Neufville 50' | Report | Dykes 3' | Stadium: Plough Lane; Attendance: 5,138 (2,000 away) |

| 25 July 2023 Friendly | AFC Wimbledon | 1–0 | Portsmouth | Wimbledon |
| 19:00 BST | Stevenson 25' (o.g.) | Report | | Stadium: Plough Lane; Attendance: 3,047 (1,215 away) |

| 29 July 2023 Friendly | Wealdstone | 0–2 | AFC Wimbledon | Ruislip |
| 13:00 BST | | Report | Bugiel; Al-Hamadi | Stadium: Grosvenor Vale |

== Competitions ==
=== Overall record ===
| Competition | First match | Last match | Starting round | Final position | Record | | | | | | | |
| Competition | First match | Last match | Starting round | Final position | Pld | W | D | L | GF | GA | GD | Win % |
|---|---|---|---|---|---|---|---|---|---|---|---|---|
| League Two | 5 August 2023 | 27 April 2024 | Matchday 1 | 10th | 46 | 17 | 14 | 15 | 64 | 51 | +13 | 36.96 |
| FA Cup | 4 November 2023 | 6 January 2024 | First round | Third round | 3 | 2 | 0 | 1 | 11 | 4 | +7 | 66.67 |
| EFL Cup | 9 August 2023 | 30 August 2023 | First round | Second round | 2 | 1 | 0 | 1 | 3 | 3 | +0 | 50.00 |
| EFL Trophy | 5 September 2023 | 30 January 2024 | Group stage | Quarter-finals | 6 | 3 | 1 | 2 | 11 | 7 | +4 | 50.00 |
| Total | | | | | 57 | 23 | 15 | 19 | 89 | 65 | +24 | 40.35 |

Last updated: 30 April 2024
Source: Soccerway

=== League Two ===
==== League table ====
| Pos | Team | Pld | W | D | L | GF | GA | GD | Pts | Promotion, qualification or relegation |
|---|---|---|---|---|---|---|---|---|---|---|
| 7 | Crawley Town (O, P) | 46 | 21 | 7 | 18 | 73 | 67 | +6 | 70 | Qualified for League Two play-offs |
| 8 | Barrow | 46 | 18 | 15 | 13 | 62 | 56 | +6 | 69 | |
| 9 | Bradford City | 46 | 19 | 12 | 15 | 61 | 59 | +2 | 69 | |
| 10 | AFC Wimbledon | 46 | 17 | 14 | 15 | 64 | 51 | +13 | 65 | |
| 11 | Walsall | 46 | 18 | 11 | 17 | 69 | 73 | −4 | 65 | |
| 12 | Gillingham | 46 | 18 | 10 | 18 | 46 | 57 | −11 | 64 | |
| 13 | Harrogate Town | 46 | 17 | 12 | 17 | 60 | 69 | −9 | 63 | |

Source: EFL Official Website
Rules for classification: 1) Points; 2) Goal difference; 3) Number of goals scored; 4) Head-to-head results; 5) Wins; 6) Away goals; 7) Penalty points (sec 9.5); 8) 12-point sending off offences
(O) Play-off winners; (P) Promoted

==== Results summary ====
| Overall | | | | | | | | Home | | | | | | Away | | | | | |
| Pld | W | D | L | GF | GA | GD | Pts | W | D | L | GF | GA | GD | W | D | L | GF | GA | GD |
|---|---|---|---|---|---|---|---|---|---|---|---|---|---|---|---|---|---|---|---|
| 46 | 17 | 14 | 15 | 64 | 51 | +13 | 65 | 11 | 6 | 6 | 41 | 25 | +16 | 6 | 8 | 9 | 23 | 26 | −3 |

Last updated: 20 April 2024.
Source: Soccerway

==== Results by round ====
| Round | 1 | 2 | 3 | 4 | 5 | 6 | 7 | 8 | 9 | 10 | 11 | 12 | 13 | 14 | 15 | 16 | 17 | 19 | 20 | 21 | 22 | 23 | 24 | 25 | 26 | 28 | 18^{1} | 30 | 31 | 32 | 33 | 34 | 29^{3} | 35 | 36 | 27^{2} | 37 | 38 | 39 | 40 | 41 | 42 | 43 | 44 | 45 | 46 |
|---|---|---|---|---|---|---|---|---|---|---|---|---|---|---|---|---|---|---|---|---|---|---|---|---|---|---|---|---|---|---|---|---|---|---|---|---|---|---|---|---|---|---|---|---|---|---|
| Ground | A | H | A | A | H | A | H | H | A | H | A | A | H | A | H | A | H | H | A | H | A | A | H | H | A | A | A | H | A | H | A | H | H | A | H | H | A | H | H | A | H | A | H | A | A | H |
| Result | D | D | W | W | D | D | L | D | W | W | W | D | L | D | L | L | W | W | L | W | D | W | L | W | D | L | L | W | D | W | L | D | L | L | W | D | W | W | L | D | D | L | W | L | L | W |
| Position | 12 | 17 | 7 | 3 | 5 | 6 | 11 | 11 | 8 | 6 | 2 | 4 | 8 | 8 | 10 | 10 | 9 | 8 | 10 | 7 | 7 | 7 | 8 | 7 | 7 | 10 | 10 | 9 | 9 | 9 | 10 | 8 | 9 | 12 | 10 | 8 | 8 | 7 | 7 | 9 | 10 | 10 | 8 | 10 | 12 | 10 |
| Points | 1 | 2 | 5 | 8 | 9 | 10 | 10 | 11 | 14 | 17 | 20 | 21 | 21 | 22 | 22 | 22 | 25 | 28 | 28 | 31 | 32 | 35 | 35 | 38 | 39 | 39 | 39 | 42 | 43 | 46 | 46 | 47 | 47 | 47 | 50 | 51 | 54 | 57 | 57 | 58 | 58 | 59 | 62 | 62 | 62 | 65 |

Updated to match(es) played on 20 April 2024. Source: Soccerway
A = Away; H = Home; W = Win; D = Draw; L = Loss; P = Postponed
Notes:
- ^{1} Matchday 18 (vs Milton Keynes Dons) was postponed due to international call-ups.
- ^{2} Matchday 27 (vs Grimsby Town) was postponed due to FA Cup involvement.
- ^{3} Matchday 29 (vs Crawley Town) was postponed due to a frozen pitch.

==== Matches ====
On 22 June, the EFL League Two fixtures were released.

Win Draw Loss Fixtures

| 5 August 2023 1 | Grimsby Town | 0–0 | AFC Wimbledon | Cleethorpes |
| 15:00 BST | Clifton (yellow card) 58'; Conteh (yellow card) 69'; Green (yellow card) 89'; Pyke (yellow card) 90+8' | Report | Johnson (yellow card) 49'; Al-Hamadi (penalty missed) 59' (yellow card) 61'; Little (yellow card) 90+6' | Stadium: Blundell Park; Attendance: 7,214; Referee: Matthew Corlett |

| 12 August 2023 2 | AFC Wimbledon | 1–1 | Wrexham | Wimbledon |
| 15:00 BST | Bugiel (yellow card) 40'; Lewis (yellow card) 48'; Al-Hamadi (penalty missed) 66'; Pell (yellow card) 75'; Tilley 81' (pen.) | Report | Lee 22' (yellow card) 75'; Boyle (yellow card) 56' | Stadium: Plough Lane; Attendance: 8,584; Referee: Darren Drysdale |

| 15 August 2023 3 | Colchester United | 0–2 | AFC Wimbledon | Colchester |
| 19:75 BST | Mandela Egbo (yellow card) 83'; Ihionvien (yellow card) 89' | Report | Tilley 54', 85' (yellow card) 67'; Ogundere (yellow card) 65'; Davison (yellow card) 75' | Stadium: Colchester Community Stadium; Attendance: 4,036; Referee: Ben Atkinson |

| 19 August 2023 4 | Sutton United | 0–3 | AFC Wimbledon | Sutton |
| 15:00 BST | Beautyman (yellow card) 45+3'; Goodliffe (yellow card) 74' | Report | Johnson 64'; Al-Hamadi (yellow card) 65'; Pell 80'; Tilley 86' | Stadium: Gander Green Lane; Attendance: 4,719; Referee: David Rock |

| 26 August 2023 5 | AFC Wimbledon | 1–1 | Forest Green Rovers | Wimbledon |
| 15:00 BST | Ball 35'; Al-Hamadi (yellow card) 38'; Davison (yellow card) 72' | Report | McCann (yellow card) 45+2'; Deeney 75' | Stadium: Plough Lane; Attendance: 6,949; Referee: Paul Howard |

| 2 September 2023 6 | Newport County | 2–2 | AFC Wimbledon | Newport |
| 15:00 BST | Delaney (yellow card) 34'; Evans 45+2'; Bogle 55' | Report | Tilley 9', 30'; Pell (yellow card) 90+6' | Stadium: Rodney Parade; Attendance: 4,008; Referee: Jacob Miles |

| 9 September 2023 7 | AFC Wimbledon | 1–2 | Stockport County | Wimbledon |
| 15:00 BST | Davison 32' (yellow card) 42'; Brown (yellow card) 45+3' | Report | Croasdale (yellow card) 45+2'; Barry 50'; Collar 62'; Olaofe (yellow card) 68' | Stadium: Plough Lane; Attendance: 7,607; Referee: Alan Young |

| 16 September 2023 8 | AFC Wimbledon | 2–2 | Crewe Alexandra | Wimbledon |
| 15:00 BST | Neufville 30'; Tilley 38'; Ogundere (yellow card) 52'; Currie (yellow card) 57' | Report | Tabiner 51'; White (yellow card) 90+7'; Nevitt 90+10'; Rowe (yellow card) 90+13' | Stadium: Plough Lane; Attendance: 8,147; Referee: Lewis Smith |

| 23 September 2023 9 | Walsall | 1–3 | AFC Wimbledon | Walsall |
| 15:00 BST | Allen (red card) 37'; Draper 58' | Report | Lemonheigh-Evans 6'; Currie 61'; Al-Hamadi 83' | Stadium: Bescot Stadium; Attendance: 5,318; Referee: Declan Bourne |

| 30 September 2023 10 | AFC Wimbledon | 4–1 | Tranmere Rovers | Wimbledon |
| 15:00 BST | Little 21'; Al-Hamadi 32', 62', 88' | Report | Jennings 4'; Turnbull (red card) 54' | Stadium: Plough Lane; Attendance: 7,367; Referee: Daniel Middleton |

| 3 October 2023 11 | Harrogate Town | 0–1 | AFC Wimbledon | Harrogate |
| 14:45 BST | Gibson (yellow card) 79'; McDonald (yellow card) 88' | Report | Bugiel 6'; Little (yellow card) 83'; Pell (yellow card) 90+1' | Stadium: Wetherby Road; Attendance: 2,066; Referee: Peter Wright |

| 7 October 2023 12 | Mansfield Town | 0–0 | AFC Wimbledon | Mansfield |
| 15:00 BST | Bowery (yellow card) 51'; Cargill (yellow card) 90+4' | Report | Tilley (penalty missed) 27'; Currie (yellow card) 54'; Johnson (yellow card) 66' | Stadium: Field Mill; Attendance: 7,127; Referee: Martin Woods |

| 14 October 2023 13 | AFC Wimbledon | 0–1 | Bradford City | Wimbledon |
| 10:00 BST | Davison (yellow card) 17'; Lewis (yellow card) 58'; Ogundere (yellow card) 70' | Report | Platt (yellow card) 7'; Smallwood (yellow card) 31'; Osadebe 62' | Stadium: Plough Lane; Attendance: 8,270; Referee: Scott Simpson |

| 21 October 2023 14 | Barrow | 0–0 | AFC Wimbledon | Barrow-in-Furness |
| 10:00 BST | | Report | Little (yellow card) 48'; Tilley (yellow card) 80' | Stadium: Holker Street; Attendance: 3,466; Referee: Scott Tallis |

| 24 October 2023 15 | AFC Wimbledon | 2–4 | Accrington Stanley | Wimbledon |
| 14:45 BST | Pell (yellow card) 24'; Bugiel 51', 70'; Al-Hamadi (yellow card) 68'; Biler (yellow card) 82' | Report | Pritchard 4', 46'; Leigh 9'; Rich-Baghuelou (yellow card) 25'; Hills (yellow card) 54' (goal) 83'; Mellor (yellow card) 63' | Stadium: Plough Lane; Attendance: 7,108; Referee: Carl Brook |

| 28 October 2023 16 | Morecambe | 4–1 | AFC Wimbledon | Morecambe |
| 15:00 GMT | Mellon 46', 61' (pen.), 88'; Lewis 51' (o.g.); Davenport (yellow card) 65'; Tutonda (yellow card) 79' | Report | Bugiel (yellow card) 57'; Little 72' | Stadium: Mazuma Stadium; Attendance: 4,453; Referee: Edward Duckworth |

| 11 November 2023 17 | AFC Wimbledon | 2–0 | Doncaster Rovers | Wimbledon |
| 15:00 GMT | Bugiel (yellow card) 23' (yellow-red card) 90+5'; Lemonheigh-Evans (yellow card) 27'; Little (yellow card) 39'; Al-Hamadi 45+2', 63'; Biler (yellow card) 56' (yellow-red card) 72'; Bass (yellow card) 90+7' | Report | Westbrooke (yellow card) 41'; Senior (yellow card) 45' | Stadium: Plough Lane; Attendance: 8,013; Referee: Ollie Yates |

| 25 November 2023 19 | AFC Wimbledon | 4–2 | Notts County | Wimbledon |
| 15:00 GMT | Lewis (yellow card) 22'; Reeves 29' (pen.), 86' (pen.); Currie (yellow card) 38'; Al-Hamadi 41', 90+2' | Report | Jones (yellow card) 45+4'; Langstaff 62'; Nemane 67' | Stadium: Plough Lane; Attendance: 8,479; Referee: Adam Herczeg |

| 28 November 2023 20 | Gillingham | 1–0 | AFC Wimbledon | Gillingham |
| 19:45 GMT | Masterson 85' | Report | Tilley (yellow card) 43' | Stadium: Priestfield Stadium; Attendance: 5,747; Referee: Lee Swabey |

| 9 December 2023 21 | AFC Wimbledon | 4–0 | Swindon Town | Wimbledon |
| 15:00 GMT | Bugiel 6'; Neufville (yellow card) 13'; Little 59'; Al-Hamadi 79', 90+2' (yellow card) 90+3' | Report | Blake-Tracy (yellow card) 13' | Stadium: Plough Lane; Attendance: 8,275; Referee: Scott Oldham |

| 16 December 2023 22 | Salford City | 0–0 | AFC Wimbledon | Kersal |
| 15:00 GMT | N'mai (yellow card) 71'; Garbutt (yellow card) 88' | Report | Reeves (yellow card) 9' | Stadium: Moor Lane; Attendance: 2,338; Referee: Ben Speedie |

| 22 December 2023 23 | Crawley Town | 1–2 | AFC Wimbledon | Crawley |
| 19:45 GMT | Gladwin (yellow card) 50'; Conroy (yellow card) 69'; Wright 83' | Report | Davison 13'; Lewis (yellow card) 15' (yellow-red card) 65'; Al-Hamadi 18', (yellow card) 48'; Reeves (yellow card) 27'; Currie (yellow card) 90+8' | Stadium: Broadfield Stadium; Attendance: 4,792; Referee: Matthew Corlett |

| 26 December 2023 24 | AFC Wimbledon | 0–1 | Sutton United | Wimbledon |
| 15:00 GMT | Biler (yellow card) 33'; Bugiel (yellow card) 69'; Currie (yellow card) 76' | Report | Goodliffe (yellow card) 44'; Patrick (yellow card) 55'; Sowunmi 62'; Clay (yellow card) 79' | Stadium: Plough Lane; Attendance: 8,575; Referee: Sam Purkiss |

| 29 December 2023 25 | AFC Wimbledon | 5–3 | Colchester United | Wimbledon |
| 19:45 GMT | Davison 4', 52' (yellow card) 71'; Lewis 42', 90+2'; Al-Hamadi 67'; Biler (yellow card) 80'; Bugiel (yellow card) 81' | Report | McGeehan 7' (yellow card) 71' (yellow-red card) 89'; Taylor 25'; Chilvers (yellow card) 39'; Dallison-Lisbon 90+4' | Stadium: Plough Lane; Attendance: 8,062 |

| 1 January 2024 26 | Forest Green Rovers | 1–1 | AFC Wimbledon | Nailsworth |
| 15:00 GMT | Stevens 4'; Jones (yellow card) 81' | Report | Al-Hamadi 12'; Biler (yellow card) 19'; Davison (yellow card) 37' | Stadium: The New Lawn; Attendance: 2,786; Referee: James Durkin |

| 13 January 2024 28 | Wrexham | 2–0 | AFC Wimbledon | Wrexham |
| 15:00 GMT | Fletcher 61'; Mullin 69'; Lee (yellow card) 85' | Report | Currie (yellow card) 21' | Stadium: Racecourse Ground; Attendance: 12,478; Referee: David Rock |

| 23 January 2024 18 | Milton Keynes Dons | 3–1 | AFC Wimbledon | Denbigh |
| 19:45 GMT | Kemp 10'; Johnson 16' (o.g.); O'Hora 22'; Payne (yellow card) 79' | Report | Little 53'; Tilley (yellow card) 56'; Biler (red card) 65'; Kalambayi (red card) 73' | Stadium: Stadium mk Attendance: 6,278; Referee: Sunny Sukhvir Gill |
Note: Fixture was originally scheduled for 18 November, but was postponed due to international call-ups within the Milton Keynes Dons squad.

| 27 January 2024 30 | AFC Wimbledon | 2–1 | Mansfield Town | Wimbledon |
| 15:00 GMT | Bugiel 45+2'; Little (yellow card) 68'; Sasu (yellow card) 72'; Lewis (yellow card) 86'; Curtis (yellow card) 90+7', (goal) 90+7' | Report | Bowery (red card) 20'; Reed (yellow card) 45+1'; Brunt (yellow card) 58'; Swan 62'; Quinn (yellow card) 82', (red card); Keillor-Dunn (yellow card) 90+9'; Boateng (yellow card) 90+9' | Stadium: Plough Lane; Attendance: 8,114; Referee: Jacob Miles |

| 3 February 2024 31 | Bradford City | 0–0 | AFC Wimbledon | Bradford |
| 15:00 GMT | Smallwood (yellow card) 38'; McDonald (yellow card) 80'; Kavanagh (yellow card) 90+1' | Report | Brown (yellow card) 24'; Ogundere (yellow card) 45'; Bugiel (yellow card) 45+2'; Little (yellow card) 77' | Stadium: Valley Parade; Referee: Ross Joyce |

| 10 February 2024 32 | AFC Wimbledon | 2–0 | Barrow | Wimbledon |
| 15:00 GMT | Curtis 16'; Bugiel 26'; Balmer (yellow card) 45+3'; Ball (yellow card) 55'; O'Toole (yellow card) 55' | Report | Stephenson (yellow card) 31'; White (yellow card) 84'; Proctor (red card) 87' | Stadium: Plough Lane; Attendance: 7,373; Referee: Scott Simpson |

| 13 February 2024 33 | Accrington Stanley | 2–0 | AFC Wimbledon | Accrington |
| 19:45 GMT | Nolan 50'; Woods 81'; Bickerstaff (yellow card) 90+5' | Report | Ball (yellow card) 36' | Stadium: Crown Ground; Attendance: 2,032; Referee: Edward Duckworth |

| 17 February 2024 34 | AFC Wimbledon | 1–1 | Morecambe | Wimbledon |
| 15:00 GMT | Bugiel 50'; Tilley (yellow card) 62' | Report | Khumbeni (yellow card) 11'; Taylor (yellow card) 42'; Tutonda (yellow card) 66'; Stokes 74'; Davenport (yellow card) 86'; Melbourne (yellow card) 90+2' | Stadium: Plough Lane; Attendance: 7,715; Referee: Martin Woods |

| 20 February 2024 29 | AFC Wimbledon | 0–1 | Crawley Town | Wimbledon |
| 19:45 GMT | Tilley (yellow card) 11' | Report | Orsi 78' | Stadium: Plough Lane; Attendance: 7,397; Referee: Scott Tallis |
Note: Fixture was originally scheduled for 20 January, but was postponed due to a frozen pitch.

| 24 February 2024 35 | Doncaster Rovers | 1–0 | AFC Wimbledon | Doncaster |
| 15:00 GMT | Adelakun 3' | Report | Ogundere (yellow card) 28'; Little (yellow card) 46'; Tilley (yellow card) 55' | Stadium: Eco-Power Stadium; Attendance: 6,440; Referee: Adam Herczeg |

| 2 March 2024 36 | AFC Wimbledon | 1–0 | Milton Keynes Dons | Wimbledon |
| 12:30 GMT | Little (yellow card) 28'; Kelly (yellow card) 36'; Bugiel (yellow card) 77'; Reeves (yellow card) 85'; O'Toole (yellow card) 90+2'; Curtis 90+4', (yellow card) 90+5' | Report | Kelly (yellow card) 4'; Wearne (yellow card) 29'; Harvie (yellow card) 55'; Lofthouse (yellow card) 56'; Gilbey (yellow card) 65'; Norman (yellow card) 87' | Stadium: Plough Lane; Attendance: 8,182; Referee: Charles Breakspear |
Note: Fixture was originally scheduled for a 15:00 kick-off time, but was brought forward to an earlier time.

| 5 March 2024 27 | AFC Wimbledon | 0-0 | Grimsby Town | Wimbledon |
| 19:45 GMT | Curtis (yellow card) 62' | | Thompson (yellow card) 29'; Holohan (yellow card) 44'; Andrews (yellow card) 64'; Hume (yellow card) 94' | Stadium: Plough Lane; Attendance: 7,028; Referee: Daniel Middleton |
Note: Fixture was originally scheduled for 6 January, but was postponed due to FA Cup involvement.

| 9 March 2024 37 | Notts County | 0-2 | AFC Wimbledon | Nottingham |
| 15:00 GMT | O'Brien (yellow card) 24'; Cameron (yellow card) 60' | Report | O'Toole (yellow card) 15'; Tilley (yellow card) 20'; Reeves (yellow card) 33'; Bugiel (yellow card) 55'; Rawlinson 80' (o.g.); Balmer 85' | Stadium: Meadow Lane; Attendance: 10,224; Referee: Simon Mather |

| 12 March 2024 38 | AFC Wimbledon | 2-0 | Gillingham | Wimbledon |
| 19:45 GMT | Bugiel 33' 65'; Neufville (yellow card) 87' | Report | Ehmer (yellow card) 11'; Masterson (yellow card) 36' 38; Clark (yellow card) 58' | Stadium: Plough Lane; Attendance: 7,527; Referee: Thomas Kirk |

| 16 March 2024 39 | AFC Wimbledon | 0–2 | Newport County | Wimbledon |
| 15:00 GMT | O'Toole (yellow card) 20' | Report | Morris 9'; Jameson (yellow card) 36', (goal) 55'; Lewis (yellow card) 36'; Bennett (yellow card) 45'; Payne (yellow card) 70' | Stadium: Plough Lane; Attendance: 8,307; Referee: Thomas Parsons |

| 23 March 2024 40 | Crewe Alexandra | 1–1 | AFC Wimbledon | Crewe |
| 15:00 GMT | Adebisi 13'; Nevitt (yellow card) 85'; Long (yellow card) 90+1' | Report | Gordon 2'; O'Toole (yellow card) 63'; Davison (yellow card) 87' | Stadium: Gresty Road; Attendance: 5,110; Referee: Darren Drysdale |

| 29 March 2024 41 | AFC Wimbledon | 1–1 | Harrogate Town | Wimbledon |
| 15:00 GMT | Balmer (yellow card) 52'; Curtis 58' (red card) 61' | Report | Daly 8'; March (yellow card) 52' | Stadium: Plough Lane; Attendance: 8,080; Referee: Ben Speedie |

| 1 April 2024 42 | Stockport County | 1–0 | AFC Wimbledon | Edgeley |
| 15:00 GMT | Bailey 85' | Report | Lewis (yellow card) 12'; Tilley (penalty missed) 34'; Balmer (yellow card) 80'; Bugiel (yellow card) 86' | Stadium: Edgeley Park; Attendance: 9,550; Referee: Lewis Smith |

| 6 April 2024 43 | AFC Wimbledon | 1–0 | Salford City | Wimbledon |
| 15:00 GMT | Bugiel 70'; Johnson (yellow card) 81'; Brown (yellow card) 90+6'; Neufville (yellow card) 90+7' | Report | McAleny (yellow card) 7'; McLennan (yellow card) 24'; Watt (yellow card) 32' (yellow-red card) 90+9'; Garbutt (yellow card) 33'; Watson (yellow card) 45+2'; Lund (yellow card) 45+5'; Tilt (yellow card) 65'; Vassell (red card) 90+9' | Stadium: Plough Lane; Attendance: 7,749; Referee: Ben Atkinson |

| 13 April 2024 44 | Swindon Town | 3–2 | AFC Wimbledon | Swindon |
| 15:00 GMT | Drinan 51'; Godwin-Malife (yellow card) 60' (yellow-red card) 90+1'; Devoy 71', 84', (yellow card) 90+7' | Report | Lewis 2', 87' | Stadium: The County Ground; Attendance: 8,511; Referee: Ollie Yates |

| 20 April 2024 45 | Tranmere Rovers | 3–2 | AFC Wimbledon | Birkenhead |
| 15:00 GMT | Saunders 35'; Apter 45'; Jennings 71' | Report | Lewis (yellow card) 45+6'; Kelly 56', 90+5'; O'Toole (red card) 59' | Stadium: Prenton Park; Attendance: 6,456; Referee: David Rock |

| 27 April 2024 46 | AFC Wimbledon | 5–1 | Walsall | Wimbledon |
| 15:00 GMT | Bugiel 9', 34', 52'; Curtis 55'; Faal 62' (o.g.) | Report | Hutchinson 25' (pen.); Faal (yellow card) 45+7' | Stadium: Plough Lane; Attendance: 8,623; Referee: Scott Oldham |

=== FA Cup ===
The Dons were drawn at home to Cheltenham Town in the first round Ramsgate in the second round and Ipswich Town in the third round.

Win Draw Loss Fixtures

| 4 November 2023 First round | AFC Wimbledon | 5–1 | Cheltenham Town | Wimbledon |
| 15:00 GMT | Al-Hamadi 23'; Tilley 45+2', 61'; Little (yellow card) 59'; Davison 65'; Lemonheigh-Evans 70' | Report | Thompson (yellow card) 59'; Street 76'; Williams (yellow card) 90+1' | Stadium: Plough Lane; Attendance: 4,975; Referee: Alan Young |

| 2 December 2023 Second round | AFC Wimbledon | 5–0 | Ramsgate | Wimbledon |
| 15:00 GMT | Reeves 8'; Al-Hamadi 26', 53'; Neufville 43'; Lemonheigh-Evans 48' | Report | | Stadium: Plough Lane; Attendance: 6,894; Referee: Christopher Pollard |

| 6 January 2024 Third round | AFC Wimbledon | 1–3 | Ipswich Town | Wimbledon |
| 12:30 GMT | Reeves 17'; Pell (red card) 59' | Report | Davison 17' (o.g.); Tuanzebe 40'; Taylor 90' | Stadium: Plough Lane; Attendance: 8,595; Referee: Matt Donohue |

=== EFL Cup ===
AFC Wimbledon were drawn at home to Coventry City in the first round and away to Chelsea in the second round.

Win Draw Loss Fixtures

| 9 August 2023 First round | AFC Wimbledon | 2–1 | Coventry City | Wimbledon |
| 19:45 BST | Lewis (yellow card) 17'; Tilley (yellow card) 28'; Ball (yellow card) 61'; Bugiel 79'; McLean 90+3' | | Godden 17' (pen.); Howley (yellow card) 45+3' | Stadium: Plough Lane; Attendance: 4,781; Referee: Andrew Kitchen |

| 30 August 2023 Second round | Chelsea | 2–1 | AFC Wimbledon | Fulham |
| 19:45 BST | Madueke 45+1' (pen.); Fernández 72'; Maatsen (yellow card) 88' | Report | Tilley 19' (pen.); Pearce (yellow card) 47'; Pell (yellow card) 51' | Stadium: Stamford Bridge; Attendance: 37,794; Referee: Tony Harrington |

=== EFL Trophy ===
In the group stage, Wimbledon were drawn into Southern Group C alongside Crystal Palace Under-21s, Stevenage and Wycombe Wanderers. After coming second in the group, they were drawn away to Portsmouth in the second round. Wimbledon was drawn at home against Oxford United in the Third Round.

| Pos | Div | Team | Pld | W | PW | PL | L | GF | GA | GD | Pts | Qualification |
|---|---|---|---|---|---|---|---|---|---|---|---|---|
| 1 | L1 | Wycombe Wanderers | 3 | 3 | 0 | 0 | 0 | 3 | 0 | +3 | 9 | Advance to Round 2 |
| 2 | L2 | AFC Wimbledon | 3 | 1 | 1 | 0 | 1 | 3 | 2 | +1 | 5 | Advance to Round 2 |
| 3 | L1 | Stevenage | 3 | 1 | 0 | 1 | 1 | 6 | 4 | +2 | 4 | |
| 4 | ACA | Crystal Palace U21 | 3 | 0 | 0 | 0 | 3 | 2 | 8 | −6 | 0 | |

Updated to match(es) played on 14 November 2023. Source: EFL.com

Win Draw Loss Fixtures

| 5 September 2023 Group stage | AFC Wimbledon | 1–1 (6–5 p) | Stevenage | Wimbledon |
| 19:00 BST | Pell (yellow card) 14'; Davison (yellow card) 33'; Lewis 71'; Lock (yellow card) 90' | Report | MacDonald (yellow card) 40'; Neal (yellow card) 46'; Reid 55' (pen.); Forster-Caskey (yellow card) 75'; Thompson (yellow card) 88' | Stadium: Plough Lane; Attendance: 1,317; Referee: Stephen Parkinson |
| | Penalties |
| | Sasu (penalty scored); Ball (penalty scored); Brown (penalty scored); Ogundere (penalty scored); Tilley (penalty scored); Lakin (penalty scored) | | (penalty scored) Reid; (penalty scored) Hemmings; (penalty scored) MacDonald; (penalty scored) Forster-Caskey; (penalty scored) Thompson; (penalty missed) Freeman |

| 7 November 2023 Group stage | AFC Wimbledon | 2–0 | Crystal Palace U21 | Wimbledon |
| 19:00 GMT | Davison 3', 16'; Bugiel (yellow card) 28'; Kalambayi (yellow card) 74'; Jennings (yellow card) 76' | Report | | Stadium: Plough Lane; Attendance: 895; Referee: Christopher Pollard |

| 18 November 2023 Group stage | Wycombe Wanderers | 1–0 | AFC Wimbledon | High Wycombe |
| 12:30 GMT | Sadlier 84'; Breckin (yellow card) 89' | Report | Davison (penalty missed) 32'; Kalambayi (yellow card) 80' | Stadium: Adams Park; Attendance: 664; Referee: Aji Ajibola |

| 19 December 2023 Second round | Portsmouth | 2–5 | AFC Wimbledon | Portsmouth |
| 19:00 GMT | Yengi 43'; Rafferty (yellow card) 47'; Hume (yellow card) 50'; Whyte 58'; Towler (yellow card) 76' | Report | Sasu 11'; Johnson (yellow card) 18'; Davison 22'; Pearce 28', (yellow card) 50'; Pell 48'; Tilley (yellow card) 51'; Al-Hamadi 89' | Stadium: Fratton Park; Attendance: 7,922; Referee: Craig Hicks |

| 9 January 2024 Round of 16 | AFC Wimbledon | 2–0 | Oxford United | Wimbledon |
| 19:45 GMT | Tilley 21', 50'; Johnson (yellow card) 67'; Kalambayi (yellow card) 74' | Report | Eastwood (red card) 89' | Stadium: Plough Lane; Attendance: 1,316; Referee: Declan Bourne |

| 30 January 2024 Quarter-final | Peterborough United | 3–1 | AFC Wimbledon | Peterborough |
| 19:30 GMT | Mothersille 2'; Mason-Clark 4'; Knight (yellow card) 83'; Jones 90+5' | Report | Ball (yellow card) 10'; McLean 89' | Stadium: London Road Stadium; Attendance: 3,225; Referee: Carl Brook |
