= Ryan McLean =

English footballer

Personal information
- Date of birth: 3 May 2000 (age 26)
- Position: Winger

Team information
- Current team: Worcester City (on loan from Matlock Town)

Youth career
- Shrewsbury Town
- AFC Telford United

Senior career*
| Years | Team | Apps | (Gls) |
| 2019–2021 | Newcastle Town | 31 | (17) |
| 2021 | → Hereford (loan) | 1 | (0) |
| 2021–2023 | Hereford | 81 | (13) |
| 2023–2025 | AFC Wimbledon | 8 | (0) |
| 2023–2024 | → Kidderminster Harriers (loan) | 10 | (0) |
| 2025 | → Yeovil Town (loan) | 7 | (0) |
| 2025–2026 | Buxton | 28 | (2) |
| 2026 | → Harborough Town (loan) | | |
| 2026– | Matlock Town | | |
| 2026– | → Worcester City (loan) | 6 | (0) |
- * Club domestic league appearances and goals as of 08:19, 17 September 2026 (UTC)

Ryan McLean (born 3 May 2000) is an English professional footballer who plays as a winger for Southern Football League Premier Division Central club Worcester City on loan from Northern Premier League Division One East club Matlock Town.

== Career ==
=== Youth ===
McLean played youth football for Shrewsbury Town before being released aged 15, before going on to feature for AFC Telford United youth sides.

=== Non-League ===
McLean joined his local club Allscott Heath, playing in the West Midlands (Regional) League, before moving to Market Drayton Town, followed by Northern Premier League Division One South East club Newcastle Town.

In February 2021, McLean stepped up two divisions to join National League North club Hereford on loan for the remainder of the season. He only made one substitute appearance at Hereford before COVID-19 halted their season.

In June 2021, McLean joined Hereford permanently for an undisclosed fee, signing a two-year contract with the club.

=== AFC Wimbledon ===
Despite being offered a contract extension with Hereford, McLean signed for AFC Wimbledon in June 2023, for an undisclosed fee. Upon turning professional with Wimbledon he was able to quit his job in IT recruitment. In his first professional appearance, McLean scored in stoppage time during an EFL Cup first round match against Coventry City, securing a win for Wimbledon and earning the team a second round fixture at Chelsea.

On 24 October 2023, McLean joined National League club Kidderminster Harriers on loan until January. He was named as a substitute that same evening in their league fixture away to Altrincham, but did not feature. He made his first start in an FA Cup first round fixture against Fleetwood Town, assisting Kidderminster's only goal of the game in a 2–1 defeat. In April 2024, McLean suffered an ACL injury in the Dons penultimate match of the season.

On 4 March 2025, McLean joined National League side Yeovil Town on loan for the remainder of the season. He was not offered a new contract at the end of the 2024–25 season and left the club upon expiry of his contract on 30 June 2025.

=== Return to non-League ===
In July 2025, he signed for National League North club Buxton.

In June 2026, McLean joined Northern Premier League Division One East club Matlock Town. In August he joined Worcester City on a season-long loan.

== Career statistics ==
As of match played 19 August 2025

Appearances and goals by club, season and competition
| Club | Season | League | | | FA Cup | | EFL Cup | | Other | | Total | |
| Club | Season | Division | Apps | Goals | Apps | Goals | Apps | Goals | Apps | Goals | Apps | Goals |
|---|---|---|---|---|---|---|---|---|---|---|---|---|
| Newcastle Town | 2019–20 | NPL Division One South East | 24 | 10 | 0 | 0 | — | | 5 (Note: One appearance in FA Trophy; three appearances, three goals in Staffordshire Senior Cup; one appearance in Integro League Cup) | 4 | 29 | 14 |
| Newcastle Town | 2020–21 | NPL Division One South East | 7 | 7 | 1 | 1 | — | | 2 (Note: Appearance(s) in FA Trophy) | 1 | 10 | 9 |
| Newcastle Town | Total | | 31 | 17 | 1 | 1 | 0 | 0 | 7 | 5 | 39 | 23 |
| Hereford (loan) | 2020–21 | National League North | 1 | 0 | 0 | 0 | — | | 0 | 0 | 1 | 0 |
| Hereford | 2021–22 | National League North | 41 | 6 | 3 | 0 | — | | 1 | 1 | 45 | 7 |
| Hereford | 2022–23 | National League North | 40 | 7 | 4 | 1 | — | | 0 | 0 | 44 | 8 |
| Hereford | Total | | 81 | 13 | 7 | 1 | 0 | 0 | 1 | 1 | 89 | 15 |
| AFC Wimbledon | 2023–24 | League Two | 8 | 0 | 0 | 0 | 2 | 1 | 3 (Note: Appearance(s) in EFL Trophy) | 1 | 13 | 2 |
| AFC Wimbledon | 2024–25 | League Two | 0 | 0 | 0 | 0 | 0 | 0 | 0 | 0 | 0 | 0 |
| AFC Wimbledon | Total | | 8 | 0 | 0 | 0 | 2 | 1 | 3 | 1 | 13 | 2 |
| Kidderminster Harriers (loan) | 2023–24 | National League | 10 | 0 | 1 | 0 | — | | 1 | 1 | 12 | 1 |
| Yeovil Town (loan) | 2024–25 | National League | 7 | 0 | — | | — | | — | | 7 | 0 |
| Buxton | 2025–26 | National League North | 1 | 0 | 0 | 0 | — | | 0 | 0 | 1 | 0 |
| Career total | | | 139 | 30 | 9 | 2 | 2 | 1 | 12 | 8 | 162 | 41 |
