= Ali Al-Hamadi =

Iraqi footballer (born 2002)

- Al-Hamadi with Ipswich Town in 2024

Personal information
- Full name: Ali Ibrahim Karim Ali Al-Hamadi
- Date of birth: 1 March 2002 (age 24)
- Place of birth: Maysan, Iraq
- Height: 1.84 m (6 ft 0 in)
- Position: Forward

Team information
- Current team: Sheffield Wednesday (on loan from Ipswich Town)
- Number: 12

Youth career
- 2015–2018: Tranmere Rovers
- 2018–2021: Swansea City

Senior career*
Years	Team	Apps	(Gls)
2021–2023	Wycombe Wanderers	9	(0)
2022	→ Bromley (loan)	10	(3)
2023–2024	AFC Wimbledon	42	(23)
2024–	Ipswich Town	26	(4)
2025	→ Stoke City (loan)	15	(2)
2025–2026	→ Luton Town (loan)	13	(1)
2026–	→ Sheffield Wednesday (loan)	8	(0)

International career^{‡}
2019	Iraq U23	2	(1)
2021–	Iraq	21	(5)
- * Club domestic league appearances and goals as of 21:46, 27 October 2026 (UTC) ‡ National team caps and goals as of 07:48, 23 June 2026 (UTC)

Ali Ibrahim Karim Ali Al-Hamadi (Arabic: عَلِيّ إِبْرَاهِيم كَرِيم عَلِيّ الْحَمَّادِيّ; born 1 March 2002) is an Iraqi professional footballer who plays as a forward for EFL League One side Sheffield Wednesday, on loan from Premier League club Ipswich Town, and the Iraq national team.

== Early life ==
Al-Hamadi was born in on 1 March 2002 in Maysan, Iraq. In 2003, during the early stages of the Iraq War, one year old Al-Hamadi and his family moved from Iraq to Toxteth, Liverpool, where they would settle and he would grow up.

Al-Hamadi's father, Ibrahim, who was studying to become a lawyer at that point, was part of a peaceful protest against the dictatorship of Saddam Hussein and he ended up being jailed. His wife was pregnant, and with his father's help, was released and made his way to the UK. Like most Iraqis fleeing the war, Ali initially went to Jordan with his mother before they reunited with his father in Britain. The first time he met his father he was one-year and four-months old.

== Club career ==
=== Early career ===
In 2015, Al-Hamadi was selected to play for Liverpool Schoolboys at the age of 13 where he quickly made an impression and caught the attention of Everton and Liverpool, but ended up joining Tranmere Rovers. Al-Hamadi joined Tranmere's under-14s and stayed with the club for three years, being offered a professional contract in the summer of 2018 but he instead opted for a two-year scholarship at Swansea City's academy. On 2 July 2020, Al-Hamadi signed his first professional contract with Swansea, signing a one-year contract with the club. He was offered a new contract by Swansea in the summer of 2021 but decided to turn it down after failing to break into the first-team. In September 2021, Al-Hamadi went on trial with Derby County, scoring for their under-23 side in a 3–3 Premier League Cup draw against the Norwich City under-23s.

=== Wycombe Wanderers ===
On 20 November 2021, Al-Hamadi signed an eighteen-month contract with League One side Wycombe Wanderers, following a successful trial period at the club. On 11 March 2022, Al-Hamadi joined National League side Bromley on loan until the end of the 2021–22 season. Al-Hamadi made 11 appearances for Bromley, scoring three goals. He scored his first senior goal on 24 August 2022 in a 3–1 EFL Cup defeat against Bristol City. After struggling for game time at Adams Park Al-Hamadi expressed a desire to seek a transfer.

=== AFC Wimbledon ===
On 12 January 2023, Al-Hamadi completed a permanent transfer to League Two side AFC Wimbledon on a two-and-a-half-year deal. He scored his first goal for Wimbledon on 18 February 2023 in a 2–2 draw with Hartlepool United. In March 2023, he was awarded the EFL Young Player of the Month award. On 30 September, Al-Hamadi converted a hat-trick against Tranmere Rovers, his former youth club, in a 4–1 win. He was twice-awarded the PFA League Two Fans' Player of the Month award while at Wimbledon, earning the honours in March and September 2023.

=== Ipswich Town ===
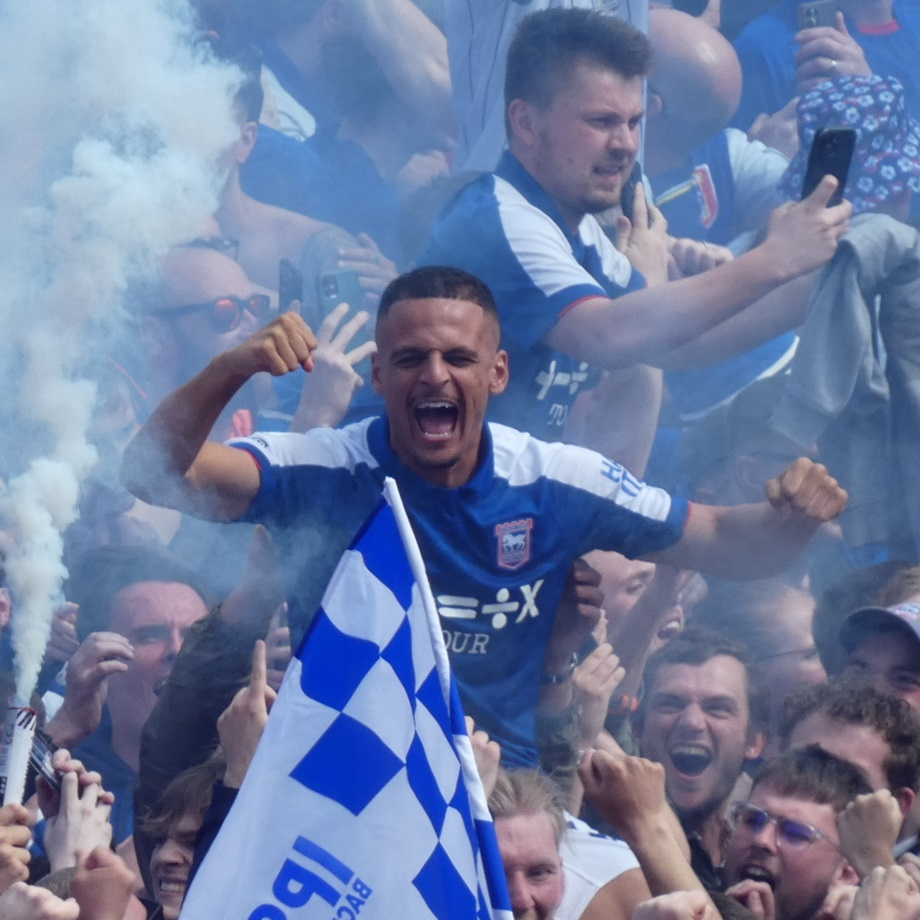
Al-Hamadi celebrating Ipswich Town's Premier League promotion in 2024

On 29 January 2024, Al-Hamadi signed for then Championship club Ipswich Town for an undisclosed fee on a four-and-a-half-year contract. He made his Ipswich debut on 3 February, in a 3–2 defeat to Preston North End. On 14 February, he scored his first goal for the club, converting a penalty in stoppage time of a 4–0 away victory over Millwall. He was a member of the team that achieved promotion to the Premier League that season, ending a 22-year absence from the top flight. On 17 August, Al-Hamadi was brought on as a substitute during Ipswich's first match of the 2024–25 season against Liverpool, becoming the first Iraqi footballer to play in the Premier League.

On 24 January 2025, Al-Hamadi joined Stoke City on loan for the remainder of the 2024–25 season. He scored on his debut helping Stoke to a 2–1 victory at Hull City. He scored the only goal against Blackburn Rovers on 12 March 2025. Al-Hamadi made 15 appearances for Stoke helping them to avoid relegation on the final day of the season.

On 2 September 2025, Al-Hamadi joined Luton Town on a season-long loan with an obligation to buy. After suffering a series of injuries, he scored his first goal for Luton Town against former club AFC Wimbledon on 6 April 2026.

On 26 August 2026, Al-Hamadi joined League One club Sheffield Wednesday on loan for the duration of the 2026–27 season. He made his debut the following weekend, coming on as a late substitute in a 7–2 win against Bromley.

== International career ==
=== Youth ===
Al-Hamadi was eligible to play for both England and Iraq at international level and accepted a call-up to the Iraq U23 team in 2019, declaring for the country of his birth.

In late 2019, Al-Hamadi received and accepted an invitation from the Iraq under-23s to join them in their preparations for the 2020 AFC U-23 Championship. Al-Hamadi made his debut for and scored his first goal in October 2019. He was not included in the squad for the final tournament due to an injury he picked up at the training camp.

=== Senior ===
Al-Hamadi received his first call-up to the senior national team in November 2021 as part of Iraq's squad for their 2022 FIFA World Cup qualifiers against South Korea and Syria, with Iraq's first choice striker Mohanad Ali out injured and Alaa Abbas still regaining fitness after his injury. Al-Hamadi was named in the starting line-up and made his debut on 11 November in a 1–1 draw against Syria before gaining his second cap in a 3–0 loss to South Korea on 16 November, playing the full match.

In December 2023, he was named in the 26-man squad for the 2023 AFC Asian Cup in Qatar.

On 31 March 2026, he scored the opening goal in the intercontinental play-off final against Bolivia taking Iraq to the 2026 FIFA World Cup, their first in 40 years.

== Personal life ==
Al-Hamadi is a Shia Muslim.

== Career statistics ==
=== Club ===
As of 27 October 2026

Appearances and goals by club, season and competition
Club	Season	League			FA Cup		EFL Cup		Other		Total	
Club	Season	Division	Apps	Goals	Apps	Goals	Apps	Goals	Apps	Goals	Apps	Goals
Wycombe Wanderers	2021–22	League One	0	0	0	0	0	0	0	0	0	0
Wycombe Wanderers	2022–23	League One	9	0	0	0	2	1	2 (Note: Appearances in EFL Trophy)	0	13	1
Wycombe Wanderers	Total		9	0	0	0	2	1	2	0	13	1
Bromley (loan)	2021–22	National League	10	3	0	0	—		1 (Note: Appearances in FA Trophy)	0	11	3
AFC Wimbledon	2022–23	League Two	19	10	0	0	0	0	0	0	19	10
AFC Wimbledon	2023–24	League Two	23	13	2	3	2	0	2	1	29	17
AFC Wimbledon	Total		42	23	2	3	2	0	2	1	48	27
Ipswich Town	2023–24	Championship	14	4	0	0	0	0	—		14	4
Ipswich Town	2024–25	Premier League	11	0	1	0	1	1	—		13	1
Ipswich Town	2025–26	Championship	1	0	—		1	0	—		2	0
Ipswich Town	2026–27	Premier League	0	0	0	0	0	0	—		0	0
Ipswich Town	Total		26	4	1	0	2	1	0	0	29	5
Stoke City (loan)	2024–25	Championship	15	2	—		—		—		15	2
Luton Town (loan)	2025–26	League One	13	1	1	0	—		—		14	1
Sheffield Wednesday (loan)	2026–27	League One	8	0	0	0	—		0	0	8	0
Career total			124	33	4	3	6	2	5	1	138	39

=== International ===
As of match played 22 June 2026

Appearances and goals by national team and year
National team	Year	Apps	Goals
Iraq	2021	2	0
Iraq	2022	3	0
Iraq	2023	6	3
Iraq	2024	3	0
Iraq	2025	2	1
Iraq	2026	5	1
Total		21	5

Scores and results list Iraq's goal tally first.

List of international goals scored by Ali Al-Hamadi
No.	Date	Venue	Opponent	Score	Result	Competition
1	7 September 2023	700th Anniversary Stadium, Chiang Mai, Thailand	India	1–1	2–2 (5–4 p)	2023 King's Cup
2	17 October 2023	Amman International Stadium, Amman, Jordan	Jordan	2–1	2–2 (5–3 p)	2023 Jordan International Tournament
3	16 November 2023	Basra International Stadium, Basra, Iraq	Indonesia	5–1	5–1	2026 FIFA World Cup qualification
4	13 November 2025	Mohammad Bin Zayed Stadium, Abu Dhabi, United Arab Emirates	United Arab Emirates	1–0	1–1	2026 FIFA World Cup qualification
5	31 March 2026	Estadio BBVA, Monterrey, Mexico	Bolivia	1–0	2–1	2026 FIFA World Cup qualification

== Honours ==
Bromley

- FA Trophy: 2021–22

Ipswich Town

- EFL Championship runner-up: 2023–24

Luton Town

- EFL Trophy: 2025–26

Individual

- EFL Young Player of the Month: March 2023
- PFA League Two Fans Player of the Month: September, November, December 2023
