= Jack Currie (English footballer) =

English footballer (born 2001)

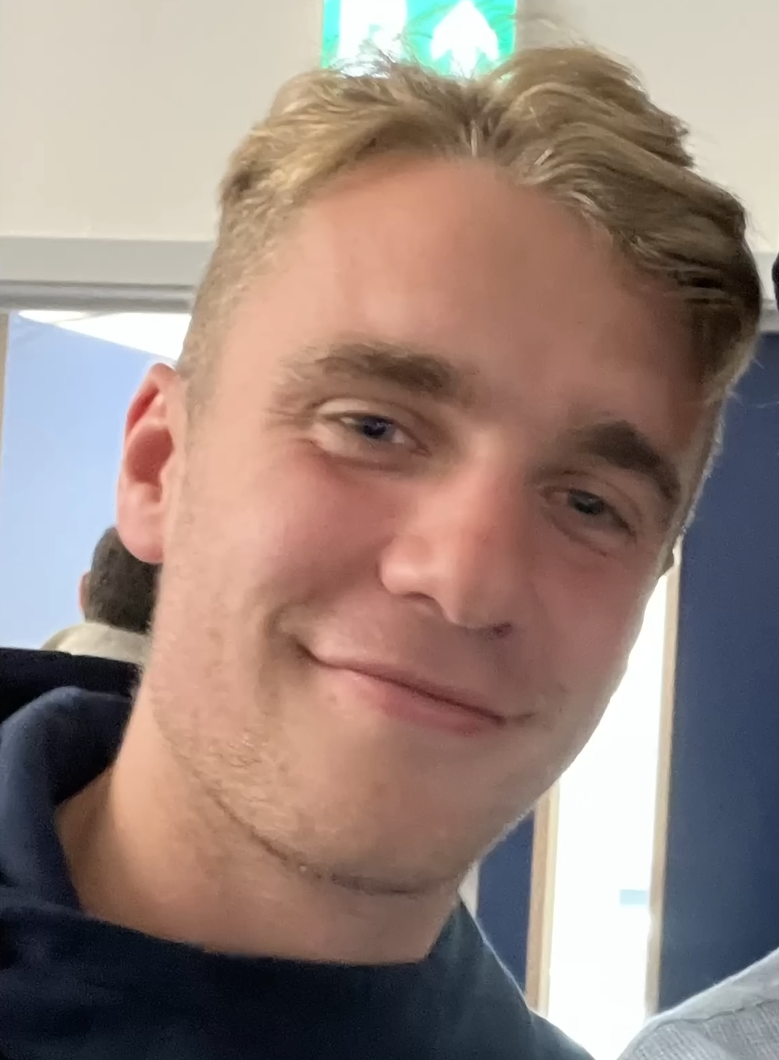
- Currie c. 2023

Personal information
- Full name: Jack Alexander Currie
- Date of birth: 25 October 2002 (age 24)
- Place of birth: Kingston upon Thames, England
- Height: 1.75 m (5 ft 9 in)
- Position: Defender

Team information
- Current team: Oxford United
- Number: 26

Youth career
- 2013–2020: AFC Wimbledon

Senior career*
Years	Team	Apps	(Gls)
2020–2024	AFC Wimbledon	94	(2)
2020	→ Leatherhead (loan)	9	(0)
2021–2022	→ Eastbourne Borough (loan)	32	(0)
2024–	Oxford United	26	(0)
2024–2025	→ Leyton Orient (loan)	36	(0)
- * Club domestic league appearances and goals as of 2 June 2025 (UTC)

Jack Alexander Currie (born 25 October 2002) is an English professional footballer who plays as a defender for EFL League One club Oxford United.

== Early life ==
Currie attended the St Lawrence Junior School in East Molesey, before going to Esher High School. He joined the Wimbledon academy when he was 11 years old. He signed his first professional contract with Wimbledon in September 2020.

== Career ==
=== AFC Wimbledon ===
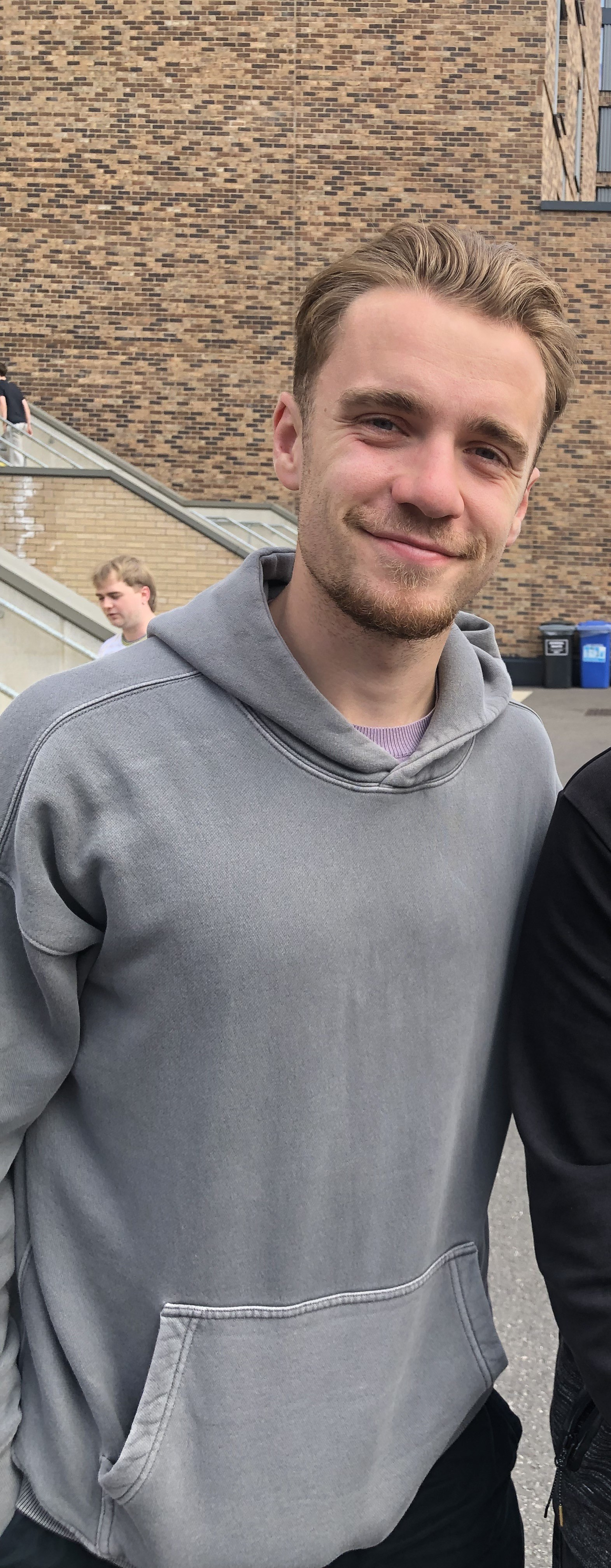
Currie at Plough Lane before Will Nightingale's testimonial match in 2025

Currie signed a contract with AFC Wimbledon in September 2020. In February 2021 he joined Maidstone United on a 6-month loan; however, the 2020–21 season for Maidstone was curtailed because of the COVID-19 pandemic. Having also spent time on loan at Leatherhead, the following season he joined Eastbourne Borough of the National League South on loan in July 2021. Currie won the Players' Player of the Season award at the end of the 2021–22 season.

Currie made his senior league debut at left-back for AFC Wimbledon on the opening day of the 2022–23 season, a 2–0 win over Gillingham at Plough Lane on 30 July 2022, scoring the second goal. He described it as "what you dream of as a kid". Currie made 32 appearances in all competitions for Wimbledon by January 2023, and was reportedly the subject of transfer offers from EFL Championship side Bristol City in the January 2023 transfer window. According to the Bristol Post, Wimbledon rejected a number of bids for Currie on transfer deadline day. On 23 September 2023 he scored another EFL League Two goal for Wimbledon in a 1–3 away win at Walsall F.C.. By the time he left the club, he had played 94 matches in all competitions for the Dons.

=== Oxford United ===
On 5 July 2024, Currie signed for newly promoted EFL Championship club Oxford United for an undisclosed transfer fee.

==== Leyton Orient (loan) ====
Currie signed a season-long loan for League One side Leyton Orient on 30 August 2024. He played 45 matches for the club and recorded two assists, during the season, which saw the club reach the playoffs. He later described the season as "a year to remember with a club who made me feel at home from the first game to the last" on his Twitter (X) account.

Oxford United

Currie returned to United for the EFL Championship 2025–26 season. He was selected for the team's pre-season tour of Indonesia.

Currie came on for his club debut at 69 minutes in the opening match of the season at home against Portsmouth on 9 August 2025. On 22 November 2025, he gained his first assist of the season in Oxford's 1–1 draw at home to Middlesbrough, when he set up a goal for teammate Luke Harris.

== Career statistics ==
As of match played 28 February 2026

Appearances and goals by club, season and competition
Club	Season	League			FA Cup		League Cup		Other		Total	
Club	Season	Division	Apps	Goals	Apps	Goals	Apps	Goals	Apps	Goals	Apps	Goals
AFC Wimbledon	2020–21	League One	0	0	0	0	0	0	1 (Note: Appearance(s) in the EFL Trophy)	0	1	0
AFC Wimbledon	2021–22	League One	0	0	0	0	0	0	1	0	1	0
AFC Wimbledon	2022–23	League Two	41	1	2	0	1	0	3	0	47	1
AFC Wimbledon	2023–24	League Two	39	1	3	0	0	0	3	0	45	1
AFC Wimbledon	Total		80	2	5	0	1	0	8	0	94	2
Leatherhead (loan)	2020–21	Isthmian Premier Division	9	0	0	0	—		2 (Note: Appearance(s) in the FA Trophy)	0	11	0
Eastbourne Borough (loan)	2021–22	National League South	32	0	3	0	—		3 (Note: Two appearances in the FA Trophy, one appearance in the National League South play-offs)	0	38	0
Oxford United	2024–25	Championship	0	0	0	0	0	0	0	0	0	0
Oxford United	2025–26	Championship	26	0	2	0	2	0	0	0	30	0
Oxford United	Total		26	0	2	0	2	0	0	0	30	0
Leyton Orient (loan)	2024–25	League One	36	0	2	0	0	0	7 (Note: Four appearances in the FA Trophy, three appearances in the League One play-offs)	0	45	0
Career total			183	2	12	0	3	0	20	0	218	2

== Honours ==
Individual

- WhoScored's Sky Bet League One Team of the Season 2024–25
- AFC Wimbledon Men's Player of the Year: 2023–24
- AFC Wimbledon Young Player of the Year: 2022–23
- AFC Wimbledon Player's Player of the Year: 2022–23, 2023–24
- AFC Wimbledon Junior Dons Player of the Year: 2022–23, 2023–24
- AFC Wimbledon: Radio WDON Player of the Year: 2022–23
- PFA Community Champion: 2022–23
- Eastbourne Borough Players' Player of the Year: 2021–22
