= Jake Reeves =

English footballer (born 1993)

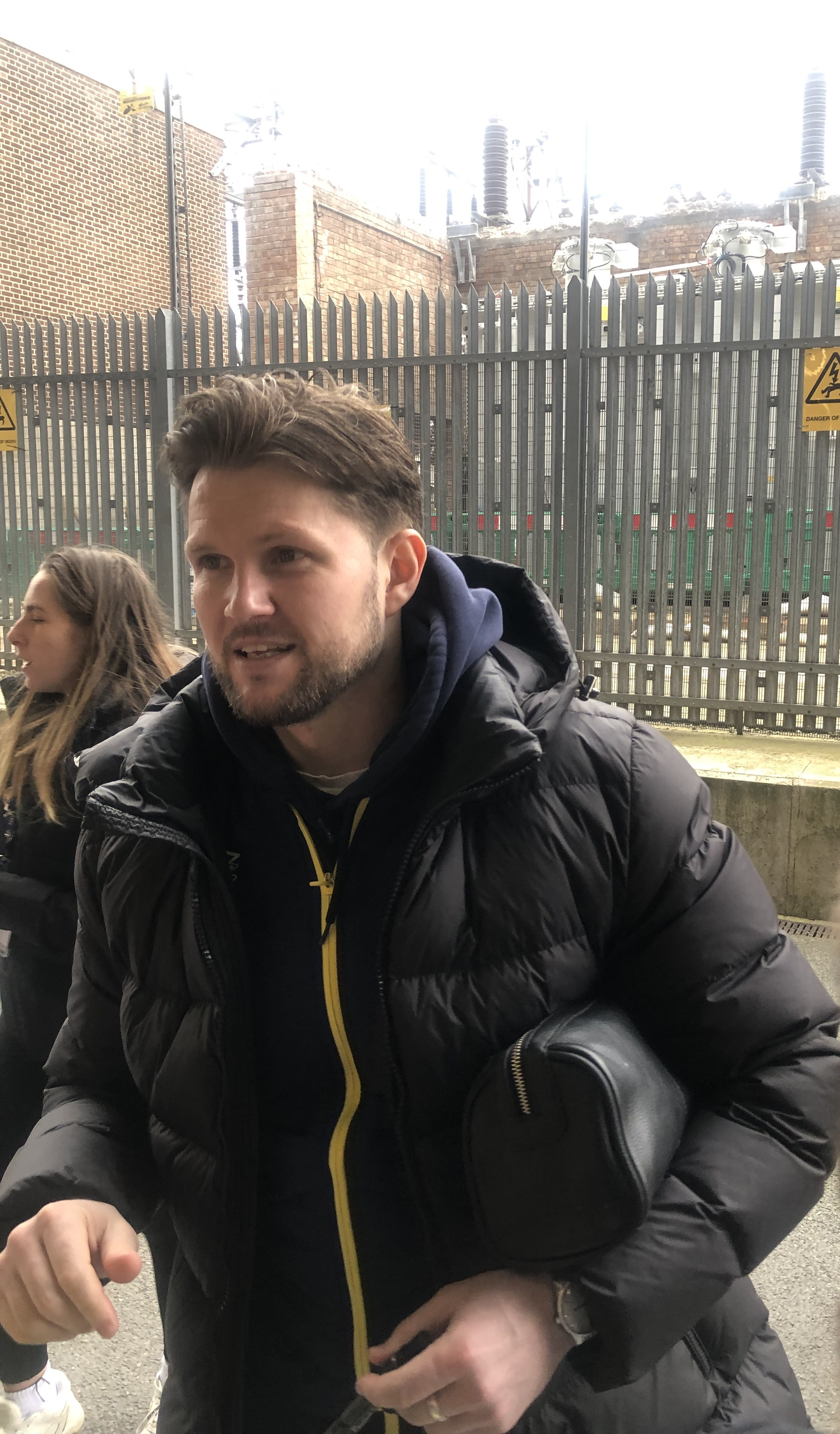
- Reeves in 2025

Personal information
- Full name: Jake Kenny Reeves
- Date of birth: 30 May 1993 (age 33)
- Place of birth: Lewisham, England
- Height: 5 ft 8 in (1.73 m)
- Position: Midfielder

Team information
- Current team: Barnet (on loan from AFC Wimbledon)
- Number: 23

Youth career
- 2006–2009: Tottenham Hotspur
- 2009–2011: Brentford

Senior career*
Years	Team	Apps	(Gls)
2011–2014	Brentford	34	(0)
2011	→ St Albans City (loan)	2	(0)
2012	→ AFC Wimbledon (loan)	5	(0)
2014	Swindon Town	10	(1)
2015–2017	AFC Wimbledon	109	(4)
2017–2020	Bradford City	43	(1)
2020–2021	Notts County	41	(5)
2021–2023	Stevenage	68	(5)
2023–	AFC Wimbledon	103	(5)
2026–	→ Barnet (loan)	11	(2)
- * Club domestic league appearances and goals as of 13:48, 22 November 2026 (UTC)

Jake Kenny Reeves (born 30 May 1993) is an English professional footballer who plays as a midfielder for EFL League Two club Barnet on loan from EFL League One club AFC Wimbledon.

Reeves began his career in the youth system at Tottenham Hotspur, before beginning his senior career with Brentford in 2011. He joined Swindon Town in August 2014, leaving at the end of the year, returning to AFC Wimbledon in January 2015.

== Career ==
=== Brentford ===
Born in Lewisham, Reeves moved from Tottenham Hotspur to Brentford in 2009 and was given a two-year scholarship. He captained the youth team during the 2010–11 season and was given his first team debut by Nicky Forster in the last game of the season, when he replaced Myles Weston after 82 minutes of a 4–4 draw with Huddersfield Town. At the end of the season he signed a two-year professional contract to be part of the Development Squad.

Reeves joined Conference South side St Albans City on a work experience loan in February 2011, linking up with fellow Brentford youth teammate Kyle Vassell. He made two league appearances.

Described by new boss Uwe Rösler as a "big option", Reeves made his first start for the club on the opening day of the 2011–12 season in a 2–0 home win over Yeovil Town. He was due to move on loan to Hayes & Yeading United in November 2011, but the move was delayed on 17 November due to ill health, before the deal was cancelled entirely a week later. He made only two further substitute appearances for Brentford during the 2011–12 season, making 11 appearances in total, but by January 2012, Director of Youth Football Development Ose Aibangee had stated that Reeves "is considered a member of the first team squad".

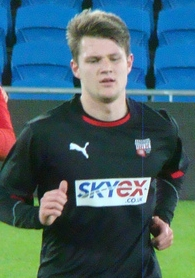
Reeves training with Brentford in January 2013.

Reeves started Brentford's first game of the 2012–13 season against Walsall in the League Cup first round, but he lasted only 25 minutes before being sent off for a challenge on Adam Chambers. He failed to feature for Brentford again until making a starting appearance in a 2–1 Football League Trophy defeat to Southend United in December.

Reeves moved on loan to League Two club AFC Wimbledon on 5 November 2012. He made his debut the following day in a 2–0 defeat at Exeter City. He was recalled by Brentford on 4 December 2012 due to an injury crisis. He made five appearances and scored no goals.

In an FA Cup match versus Chelsea on 17 February 2013, Reeves was left concussed following a collision with opposition defender David Luiz. Reeves signed a new two-year deal in April 2013, after making 15 appearances during the 2012–13 season.

Reeves was made available for loan in October 2013, after managing just one league start during the first four months of the 2013–14 season. He instead saw regular action in the Development Squad during the first half of the season, making seven appearances. Reeves scored the first senior goal of his career in an FA Cup first round tie against local neighbours Staines Town on 9 November, bagging the second in a 5–0 victory. Despite regular substitute appearances and a start under new manager Mark Warburton, Reeves was again made available for loan in February 2014. The departure of central midfielder Toumani Diagouraga on loan and injury to Adam Forshaw saw Reeves win his second start under Warburton in a 2–0 win over Tranmere Rovers on 11 March. Reeves made sporadic appearances through to the end of the season and celebrated the Bees' automatic promotion to the Championship after a 1–0 win over Preston North End on 18 April. In the 2013–14 season, Reeves made 25 appearances and scored his first goal for the club.

After failing to be named in any Brentford league squad in the opening month of the 2014–15 Championship season, Reeves was made available for loan on 18 August 2014. He chose to terminate his contract by mutual consent on 29 August and departed Griffin Park. Manager Mark Warburton said Reeves "needs to play week-in, week-out. With the level of player we have here, that opportunity is not available at Brentford now". Reeves made 47 appearances and scored one goal during his time with the Bees.

=== Swindon Town ===
Reeves signed for League One side Swindon Town on 29 August 2014, on a short-term deal running until January 2015. After his arrival, he said "I've got a lot of energy to give to the team and you'll hopefully see some good passing ranges too. I also hope to score a few goals". Reeves made his debut for the Robins with a late substitute appearance for goalscorer Jonathan Obika in a 2–1 victory over Bradford City on 13 September. He scored his first goal for the club on his fifth appearance, scoring the second goal in a 3–0 win over Barnsley on 27 September. Reeves left the club in late December 2014, after his deal expired. He made 12 appearances and scored one goal, managing just three starts.

=== AFC Wimbledon ===
In December 2014, it was reported that Reeves' former club AFC Wimbledon had shown interest in signing him.

In January 2015 Reeves rejoined the club on a permanent deal.

=== Bradford City ===
In June 2017 he was linked with a transfer to Bradford City. He signed a three-year contract with the club in July 2017, after moving for an undisclosed sum thought to be around £150,000. In September 2017 he spoke positively of the pressure expected of him, and in October 2017 of the team's strong start to the season. In January 2018 he suffered a recurrence of a groin injury he first had in November 2017, potentially ruling him out until the end of the season. In August 2018 he was stated to be close to returning to fitness. In November 2018 he was still injured and hadn't appeared played for the club since January 2018. In February 2019, after 13 months of injury, club manager David Hopkin said he was still unsure when Reeves would return to play. In April 2019 new City manager Gary Bowyer (the fourth since Reeves was injured 15 months before) said he wanted Reeves to play as he would suit his management style. In May 2019 it was announced that Reeves would continue his rehabilitation throughout the summer break, ahead of the 2019–20 season. In June 2019, Bowyer said that he had noticed a more positive attitude from Reeves, and in August 2019 Bowyer said that Reeves' input on footballing matters was beneficial. In September 2019, after 20 months of injury, Bowyer said there was no pressure on Reeves as he continued his rehabilitation. In November 2019, Bowyer said that Reeves was getting fitter and had joined in with team training for the first time since his injury. Later that month he was an unused substitute in the 1–1 FA Cup draw away at Shrewsbury Town, before returning to the first-team as captain in the EFL Trophy game at home to Rochdale three days later. Reeves later thanked Bowyer for his support throughout his injury, whilst Bowyer also praised Reeves, describing him as being like a "new signing", and setting the standard for other players. In January 2020 he was critical of the club's away form. In February 2020 he said he felt under pressure to perform for new City manager Stuart McCall, whom he had played under previously. Reeves later revealed that he didn't train with the team for two years due to injury.

On 26 May 2020 it was announced that he was one of 10 players who would leave Bradford City when their contract expired on 30 June 2020.

=== Notts County ===
He signed for National League club Notts County on 18 August 2020.

=== Stevenage ===
Reeves agreed terms with League Two club Stevenage on 21 June 2021, officially joining the club upon the expiry of his Notts County contract. Reeves scored his first Stevenage goal on the opening day of the season against Barrow.

=== Return to Wimbledon ===
In May 2023, it was announced that he would return to AFC Wimbledon on 1 July 2023. He was named Wimbledon's Player of the Year for the 2023–24 season. On 30 August 2024 Reeves signed a contract extension with Wimbledon.

Reeves joined Barnet on a season-long loan on 20 August 2026.

== Personal life ==
Reeves is a Charlton Athletic supporter.

== Career statistics ==
As of match played 21 November 2026

Appearances and goals by club, season and competition
Club	Season	League			FA Cup		League Cup		Other		Total	
Club	Season	Division	Apps	Goals	Apps	Goals	Apps	Goals	Apps	Goals	Apps	Goals
Brentford	2010–11	League One	0	0	0	0	0	0	0	0	0	0
Brentford	2011–12	League One	8	0	0	0	1	0	2 (Note: Appearance(s) in Football League Trophy/EFL Trophy)	0	11	0
Brentford	2012–13	League One	6	0	2	0	1	0	1	0	10	0
Brentford	2013–14	League One	20	0	2	1	2	0	1	0	25	1
Brentford	Total		34	0	4	1	4	0	4	0	46	1
St Albans City (loan)	2010–11	Conference South	2	0	0	0	―		0	0	2	0
AFC Wimbledon (loan)	2012–13	League Two	5	0	0	0	0	0	0	0	5	0
Swindon Town	2014–15	League One	10	1	0	0	0	0	2	0	12	1
AFC Wimbledon	2014–15	League Two	23	2	0	0	0	0	0	0	23	2
AFC Wimbledon	2015–16	League Two	40	1	1	0	0	0	4	0	45	1
AFC Wimbledon	2016–17	League One	46	1	5	0	1	0	2	0	54	1
AFC Wimbledon	Total		109	4	6	0	1	0	6	0	122	4
Bradford City	2017–18	League One	25	0	1	0	1	0	0	0	27	0
Bradford City	2018–19	League One	0	0	0	0	0	0	0	0	0	0
Bradford City	2019–20	League Two	18	1	0	0	0	0	1	0	19	1
Bradford City	Total		43	1	1	0	1	0	1	0	46	1
Notts County	2019–20	National League	0	0	0	0	―		1 (Note: Appearance(s) in the FA Trophy.)	0	1	0
Notts County	2020–21	National League	41	5	0	0	―		2	0	43	5
Notts County	Total		41	5	0	0	0	0	3	0	44	4
Stevenage	2021–22	League Two	27	2	3	0	2	0	3	0	35	2
Stevenage	2022–23	League Two	41	3	4	0	2	0	3	0	50	3
Stevenage	Total		68	5	7	0	4	0	6	0	85	5
AFC Wimbledon	2023–24	League Two	38	2	3	2	1	0	3	0	45	4
AFC Wimbledon	2024–25	League Two	27	2	0	0	2	0	3 (Note: Appearances in the playoffs)	0	32	2
AFC Wimbledon	2025–26	League One	38	1	1	0	1	0	3	0	43	1
AFC Wimbledon	2026–27	League One	0	0	0	0	0	0	0	0	0	0
AFC Wimbledon	Total		103	5	4	2	3	0	9	0	120	7
Barnet (loan)	2026–27	League Two	11	2	1	0	0	0	1	0	13	2
Career total			381	23	23	3	13	0	32	0	447	26

== Honours ==
Brentford

- Football League One second-place promotion: 2013–14

AFC Wimbledon

- EFL League Two play-offs: 2016, 2025

Stevenage

- EFL League Two second-place promotion: 2022–23

Individual

- AFC Wimbledon Player of the Year: 2023–24
