= Joe Lewis (footballer, born 1999) =

Welsh footballer (born 1999)

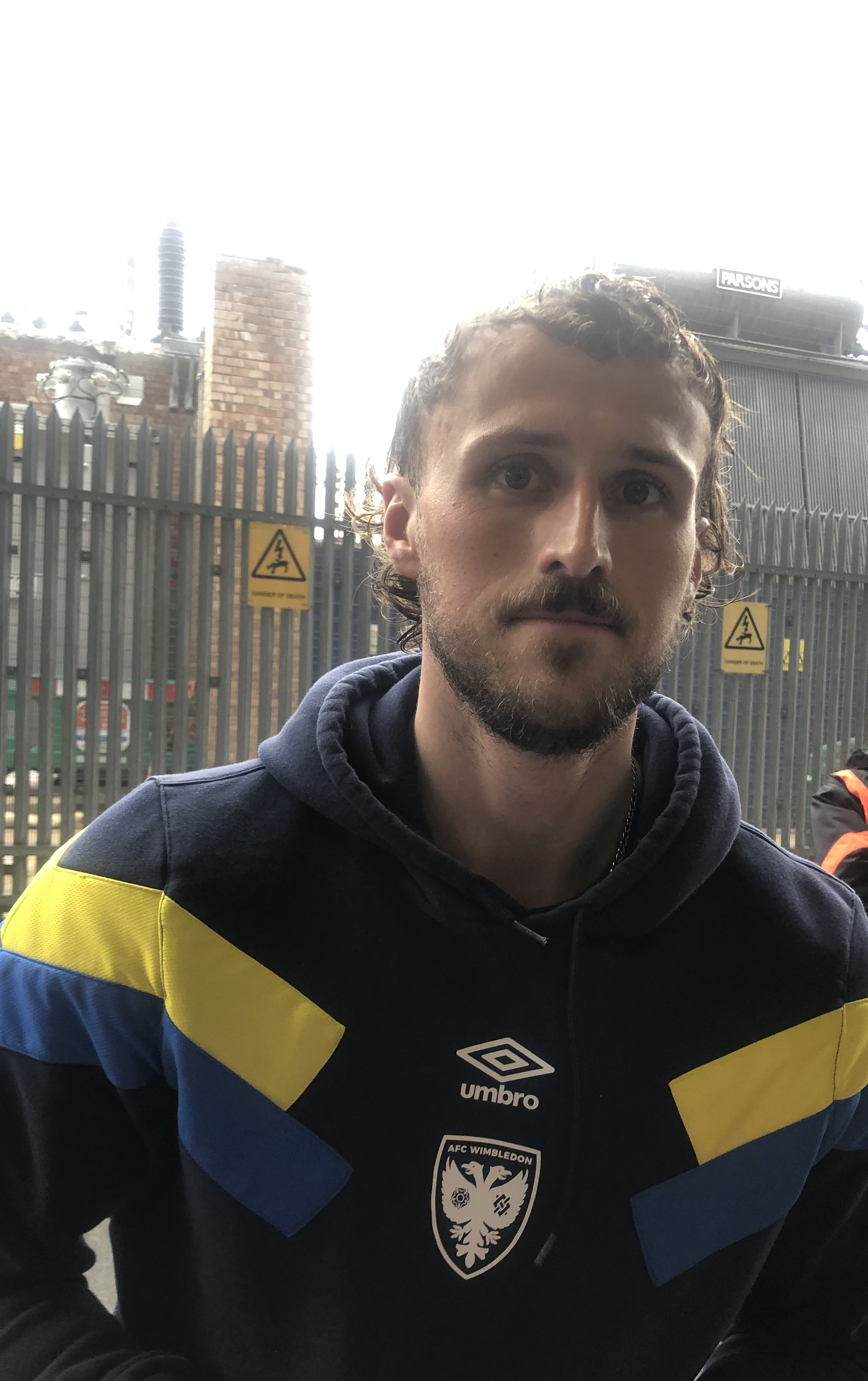
- Lewis in 2025

Personal information
- Full name: Joe Cameron Lewis
- Date of birth: 20 September 1999 (age 27)
- Place of birth: Neath, Wales
- Height: 6 ft 2 in (1.88 m)
- Position: Defender

Team information
- Current team: Burton Albion
- Number: 31

Youth career
- –2019: Swansea City

Senior career*
Years	Team	Apps	(Gls)
2019–2022	Torquay United	91	(6)
2022–2024	Stockport County	16	(0)
2023–2024	→ AFC Wimbledon (loan)	23	(2)
2024–2026	AFC Wimbledon	70	(3)
2026–	Burton Albion	5	(0)
- * Club domestic league appearances and goals as of 11:25, 22 November 2026 (UTC)

Joe Cameron Lewis (born 20 September 1999) is a Welsh professional footballer who plays for EFL League One club Burton Albion as a defender.

== Career ==
Born in Neath, Lewis played for Swansea City and Torquay United, before signing for Stockport County in June 2022.

On 30 June 2023, Lewis joined fellow League Two club AFC Wimbledon on a season-long loan deal. He scored his first goal for Wimbledon in a Football League Trophy tie against Stevenage on 5 September 2023.

On 10 January 2024, he signed for Wimbledon on a permanent basis for an undisclosed fee. His contract expired at the end of the 2025–26 season.

On 30 August 2026, Lewis joined EFL League One side Burton Albion on a one-year contract.

== Career statistics ==
As of match played on 21 November 2026

Appearances and goals by club, season and competition
Club	Season	League			FA Cup		EFL Cup		Other		Total	
Club	Season	Division	Apps	Goals	Apps	Goals	Apps	Goals	Apps	Goals	Apps	Goals
Torquay United	2019–20	National League	25	0	2	0	0	0	2 (Note: Appearance(s) in the FA Trophy)	0	29	0
Torquay United	2020–21	National League	25	0	0	0	0	0	1	0	26	0
Torquay United	2022–23	National League	41	0	2	0	0	0	1	0	44	0
Torquay United	Total		91	0	4	0	0	0	4	0	99	0
Stockport County	2022–23	League Two	16	0	3	0	2	0	3 (Note: Two appearances in the EFL Trophy, one appearance in the play-offs)	0	24	0
Stockport County	2023–24	League Two	0	0	0	0	0	0	0	0	0	0
Stockport County	Total		16	0	3	0	2	0	3	0	24	0
AFC Wimbledon (loan)	2023–24	League Two	23	2	2	0	2	0	1 (Note: Appearance(s) in the EFL Trophy)	1	28	3
AFC Wimbledon	2023–24	League Two	8	2	0	0	0	0	1	0	9	2
AFC Wimbledon	2024–25	League Two	36	1	1	0	3	0	3 (Note: Appearances in the playoffs)	0	43	1
AFC Wimbledon	2025–26	League One	26	0	1	0	0	0	5	1	32	1
AFC Wimbledon	Total		70	3	2	0	3	0	9	1	84	4
Burton Albion	2026–27	League One	5	0	1	0	0	0	1	0	7	0
Career total			205	5	12	0	7	0	18	2	242	7

== Honours ==
AFC Wimbledon

- EFL League Two play-offs: 2025
