= Chris Atkinson (footballer) =

English footballer

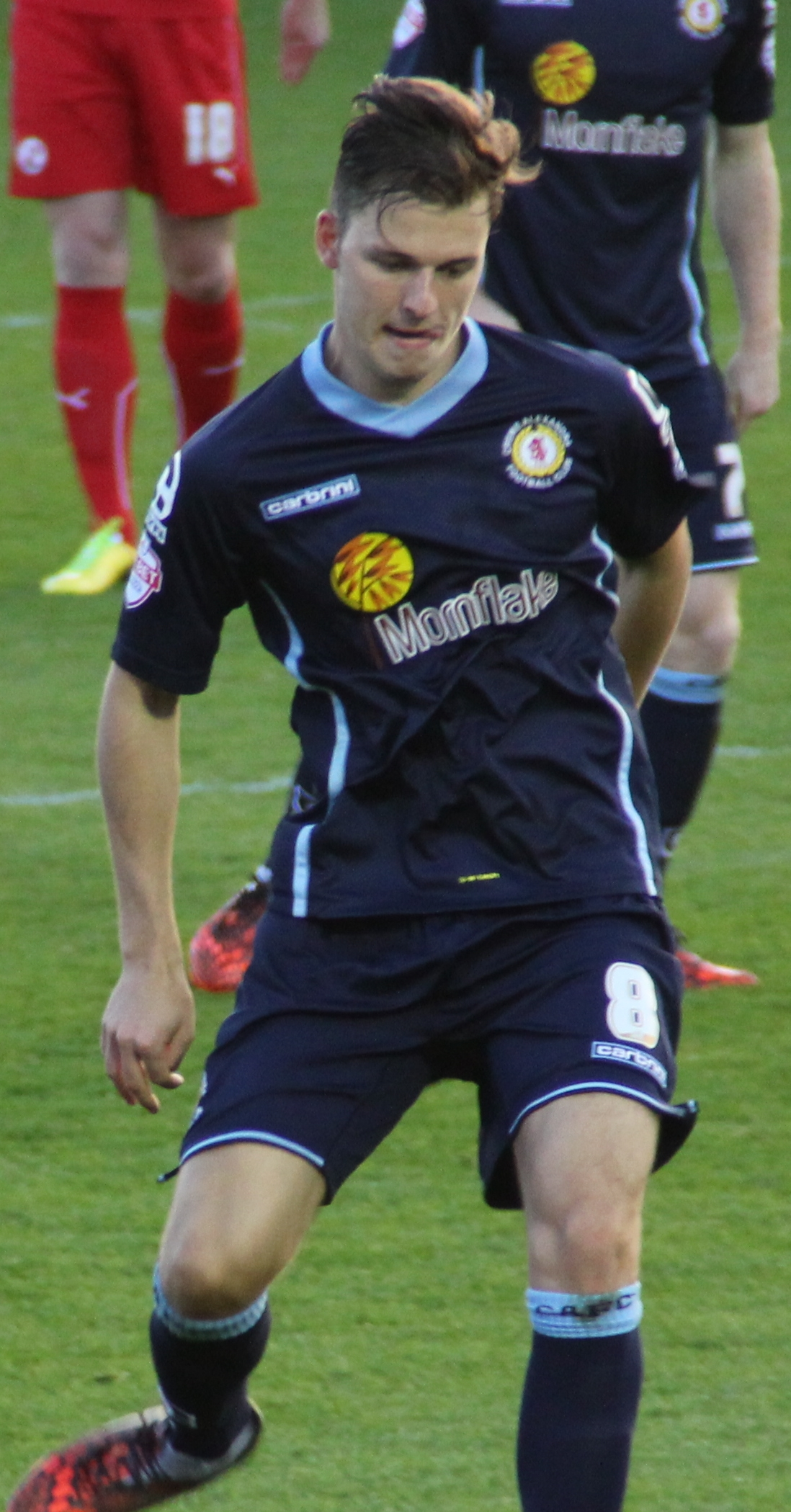
- Atkinson playing for Crewe Alexandra in 2014

Personal information
- Full name: Christopher Roy Atkinson
- Date of birth: 13 February 1992 (age 34)
- Place of birth: Halifax, England
- Height: 6 ft 1 in (1.85 m)
- Position: Midfielder

Youth career
- 2003–2010: Huddersfield Town

Senior career*
Years	Team	Apps	(Gls)
2010–2014	Huddersfield Town	10	(1)
2011–2012	→ Darlington (loan)	15	(0)
2012	→ Chesterfield (loan)	15	(5)
2013–2014	→ Tranmere Rovers (loan)	26	(2)
2014	→ Bradford City (loan)	4	(0)
2014–2016	Crewe Alexandra	34	(0)
2016	→ Crawley Town (loan)	7	(0)
2016–2017	Salford City	4	(0)
2017	→ Farsley Celtic (loan)	4	(0)
2017–2025	Farsley Celtic		
- * Club domestic league appearances and goals as of 12:25, 11 January 2025 (UTC)

Christopher Roy Atkinson (born 13 February 1992) is an English professional footballer who plays as a midfielder.

== Career ==
=== Huddersfield Town ===
Born in Halifax, West Yorkshire, Atkinson joined Huddersfield Town's Academy as a seven-year-old, having played for local junior team Warley Rangers. In May 2008, he joined the club's academy as a scholars. A key member of the youth and reserve teams in the 2009–10 season, Atkinson made the step up to the first team in 2010–11 season with a two-year professional contract. His progress led Manager Lee Clark spoke of his admiration for the youngster during pre-season.

Atkinson made his debut for the Terriers as a substitute in the 6–0 win over Macclesfield Town in the FA Cup at the Galpharm Stadium on 27 November 2010. Though he made one appearance so far for the club, Manager Clark insists Atkinson will be staying at the club beyond the season after ruling him out to go on loan for first team experience. He made his league debut in the 1–1 draw against Dagenham & Redbridge at The London Borough of Barking & Dagenham Stadium on 22 February 2011. Having made three appearances in all competitions at the end of the 2010–11 season, Atkinson signed a new contract with the club, keeping him until 2013.

Following his return to the Galpharm on 4 January 2012, Atkinson didn't make his first appearance until on 21 April 2012 against Scunthorpe United, coming on as an 81st-minute substitute for Anton Robinson, as Huddersfield Town won 1–0. This turns out to be his only appearance of the season as Huddersfield finished the season as Play-off champions winning promotion to the Championship after beating Sheffield United on penalties in the Wembley final.

Despite being given number 31 shirt for the 2012–13 season, the club planned to loan out Atkinson for first team opportunities, having been limited by Manager Simon Grayson. After being recalled by Huddersfield Town from his loan spell at Chesterfield, it was later explained as a precaution in case an appeal for Keith Southern's red card against Charlton Athletic failed. It did fail and Atkinson made his first appearance of the season, as he came off the bench in the second half of Town's 3–0 against Middlesbrough on 27 November 2012 at the Riverside Stadium. Atkinson made his first league start for Town in the West Yorkshire derby against Leeds United at the John Smith's Stadium on 1 December and scored his first goal for the Terriers in the 12th minute, but Town eventually lost 4–2. Despite the loss, Atkinson expressed joy of scoring his first goal nevertheless. It was announced on 15 January 2013, he signed a contract extension that will keep him until 2014. Atkinson then appeared in a handful of first team football for the club, appearing nine matches between November and February. Following this, he found himself placed on the substitute bench for the rest of the 2012–13 season, making nine appearances and scoring once in all competitions.

In May 2014, after returning from his loan spell at Bradford, Atkinson was released by Huddersfield, ending his twelve years spell at the club, having joined them since he was seven. Following his release, Atkinson soon attracted interests from clubs in League One and League Two.

==== Loan spells ====
On 25 July 2011, he signed a six-month loan deal with Conference Premier club Darlington in order to gain first team experience. He made his debut for the club in the opening game of the season, starting the whole game, in a 1–0 win over Braintree Town. Since making his debut for Darlington, Atkinson found himself, rotating in and out of the starting line–up. Despite, he contributed to the club by providing assists. Atkinson would go on to make fifteen appearances for the club and returned on 4 January 2012.

On 12 September 2012, Atkinson joined his teammate, Liam Ridehalgh on loan at League Two club Chesterfield. Three days later, he scored on his debut in the 3–1 win over Wycombe Wanderers. His impressive display led the club extending his loan spell with Chesterfield for a further month. Atkinson went on to score four goals in the next fifteen appearances he made, coming against Aldershot Town, Exeter City, Oxford United and Cheltenham Town. However, in a match against Fleetwood Town on 23 October 2012, Atkinson scored as an own goal, which gave the opposition team a 2–1 victory. After playing his last game against Plymouth Argyle for Chesterfield, he was recalled by Town on 26 November because of emergency crisis around the club.

Atkinson completed a 'window to window' loan move to League One club Tranmere Rovers on 18 July 2013 until 2 January 2014. He made his league debut in the opening game of the season, in a 3–1 win over Walsall. Atkinson then scored his first goal in the first round of Football League Cup, in a 2–0 win over Mansfield Town. Since making his debut for the club, he quickly established himself in the starting eleven, playing in the midfield position. Atkinson scored his first league goal, in a 4–3 loss to Brentford on 14 September 2013. His second goal for Tranmere Rovers came on 2 November 2013, in a 1–1 draw against Preston North End. After the match, Atkinson says he pleased to score, however, he was disappointed with outcome of the results. Atkinson made 28 appearances, scoring 3 goals before returning to the Terriers.

On 24 January 2014, Atkinson joined another League One club Bradford City on loan until the end of the season. He made his debut on 1 February, replacing Aaron McLean in the second half of an away game against Wolverhampton Wanderers, losing 2–0. However, Atkinson made four appearances for the club, as he found himself placed on the substitute bench before returning to Bradford City.

=== Crewe Alexandra ===
On 22 July 2014, Atkinson signed a 2-year contract with Crewe Alexandra after impressing on trial with the club. His signing for the club came when Atkinson scored his first goal for them in a pre season friendly vs Chester on 19 July. Upon joining the club, Atkinson was given number eight shirt ahead of a new season.

However, Atkinson's debut was delayed because of hamstring injury he sustained during a pre-season friendly. Atkinson made his Crewe debut on 19 August 2014, in a 5–2 loss against Rochdale, where he came on for Anthony Grant as a substitute. Since returning from injury, Atkinson, however, found his playing time, mostly coming from the substitute bench, though he does appear in a starting line–up at times. He also faced with his own injury concern. By March, Atkinson's playing time began to increase, appearing nine out of the last twelve matches of the season. However, he suffered a shoulder injury that kept him out for the rest of the 2014–15 season. At the end of the season, Atkinson made twenty–three appearances in all competitions.

In the 2015–16 season, Atkinson continued to feature in the first team, playing in the midfield position. However, he continued to found himself behind the pecking order in the competition in the midfield position. Atkinson also faced his own injury concern. By the time Atkinson was loaned out to Crawley, he made sixteen appearances in all competitions. At the end of the 2015–16 season, it was announced that the club released Atkinson after they chose not to renew his contract.

It was announced on 14 January 2016 that Atkinson was loaned out to Crawley Town on a one-month loan deal and was given a number eleven shirt. He made his debut for the club, coming on as a 66th-minute substitute, in a 1–0 loss against Notts County two days later on 16 January 2016. Atkinson then became a first team regular, playing in different midfield positions. As a result, his loan spell at Crawley Town was extended for another month. This lasted until 7 March 2016 when his loan spell with the club ended and returned to his parent club.

=== Salford City ===
In October 2016, Atkinson signed for Salford City. He went on to make four appearances for the club.

=== Farsley Celtic ===
It was announced on 5 February 2017 that Farsley Celtic signed Atkinson on loan. He made his debut for Farsley Celtic, coming on as a late substitute, in a 4–1 win against Scarborough Athletic on 7 February 2017. Atkinson went on to make four appearances at the end of the 2016–17 season. Following this, he signed for the club on a permanent basis, joining his younger brother, Ben. The next three seasons saw Atkinson quickly becoming a first team regular for Farsley Celtic and helped the club win the 2018–19's Northern Premier League champions. At the end of the 2019–20 season, which was suspended halfway through the season due to COVID-19 pandemic, he signed a contract extension with Farsley Celtic.

On 10 January 2025, Atkinson's departure from Farsley Celtic was announced. He departed as the club's all-time record appearance maker.

== Club statistics ==
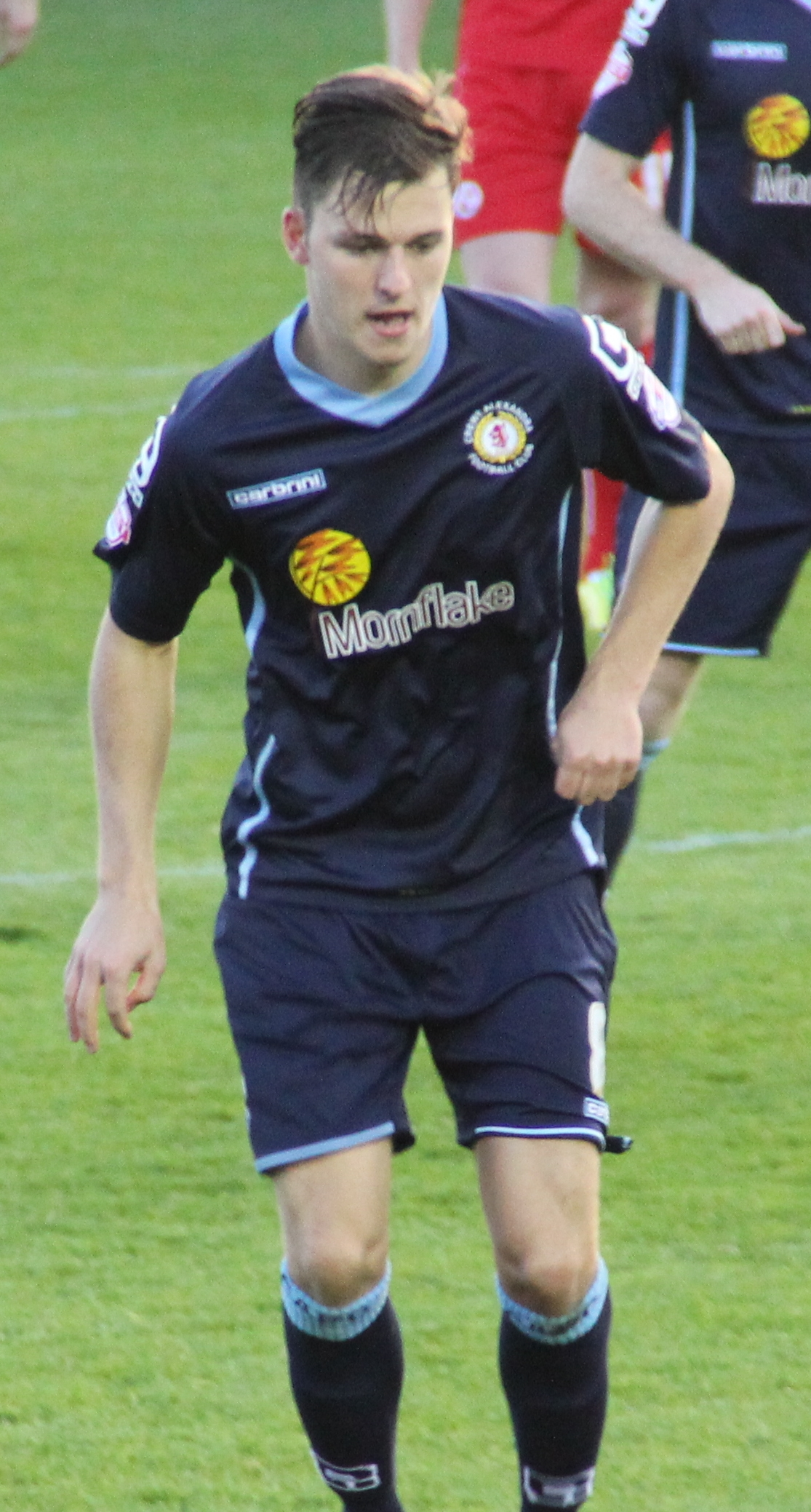
Atkinson playing for Crewe Alexandra in 2014

As of match played 1 November 2014

Club performance			League		Cup		League Cup		Continental		Total	
Season	Club	League	Apps	Goals	Apps	Goals	Apps	Goals	Apps	Goals	Apps	Goals
England			League		FA Cup		League Cup		Europe		Total	
2010–11	Huddersfield Town	League One	2	0	1	0	0	0	-		3	0
2011–12	Darlington	Conference Premier	15	0	0	0	1	0	-		16	0
2011–12	Huddersfield Town	League One	1	0	0	0	0	0	-		1	0
2012–13	Huddersfield Town	Championship	7	1	2	0	0	0	-		9	1
2012–13	Chesterfield	League Two	15	5	0	0	1	0	-		16	5
2013–14	Tranmere Rovers	League One	22	2	2	0	3	1	1	0	28	3
2013–14	Bradford City	League One	4	0	0	0	0	0	-		4	0
2014–15	Crewe Alexandra	League One	19	0	2	0	1	0	-		22	0
2015–16	Crewe Alexandra	League One	15	0	0	0	0	0	-		15	0
Career total			233	12	5	0	5	1	1	0	244	15

- NOTE: teams in Italics indicate loan period
- NOTE: Football League Trophy and Play-off results included in Total
