= 2009–10 AFC Bournemouth season =

Bournemouth
2009–10 season
- Chairman: Eddie Mitchell
- Manager: Eddie Howe
- Stadium: Dean Court
- League Two: 2nd (promoted)
- FA Cup: Second round
- League Cup: First round
- Top goalscorer: League: Brett Pitman (26); All: Brett Pitman (28)
| Home colours | Away colours | Third colours |

The 2009–10 Football League Two was AFC Bournemouth's second consecutive season in League Two. Bournemouth finished second in the table and gained promotion to League One.

== Competitions ==
=== Football League Two ===
==== League table ====
| Pos | Team | Pld | W | D | L | GF | GA | GD | Pts | Promotion, qualification or relegation |
|---|---|---|---|---|---|---|---|---|---|---|
| 1 | Notts County (C, P) | 46 | 27 | 12 | 7 | 96 | 31 | +65 | 93 | Promotion to Football League One |
| 2 | Bournemouth (P) | 46 | 25 | 8 | 13 | 61 | 44 | +17 | 83 | Promotion to Football League One |
| 3 | Rochdale (P) | 46 | 25 | 7 | 14 | 82 | 48 | +34 | 82 | Promotion to Football League One |
| 4 | Morecambe | 46 | 20 | 13 | 13 | 73 | 64 | +9 | 73 | Qualification to League Two play-offs |
| 5 | Rotherham United | 46 | 21 | 10 | 15 | 55 | 52 | +3 | 73 | Qualification to League Two play-offs |

Updated to match(es) played on unknown. Source: football-league.co.uk
(C) Champions; (P) Promoted

=== Results per matchday ===
| Matchday | 1 | 2 | 3 | 4 | 5 | 6 | 7 | 8 | 9 | 10 | 11 | 12 | 13 | 14 | 15 | 16 | 17 | 18 | 19 | 20 | 21 | 22 | 23 | 24 | 25 | 26 | 27 | 28 | 29 | 30 | 31 | 32 | 33 | 34 | 35 | 36 | 37 | 38 | 39 | 40 | 41 | 42 | 43 | 44 | 45 | 46 |
|---|---|---|---|---|---|---|---|---|---|---|---|---|---|---|---|---|---|---|---|---|---|---|---|---|---|---|---|---|---|---|---|---|---|---|---|---|---|---|---|---|---|---|---|---|---|---|
| Ground | A | H | H | A | H | A | H | A | H | A | A | H | A | H | H | A | A | H | A | H | A | A | H | H | H | A | A | A | H | H | A | H | H | A | H | A | A | H | H | A | A | H | H | A | H | A |
| Result | W | W | W | L | W | W | W | W | W | L | D | L | W | W | L | D | W | D | D | W | L | W | W | L | L | L | W | W | D | W | L | D | W | L | W | D | L | W | W | D | L | W | W | W | W | L |
| Position | 2 | 2 | 2 | 4 | 3 | 2 | 1 | 1 | 1 | 1 | 1 | 1 | 1 | 1 | 1 | 2 | 1 | 1 | 2 | 2 | 2 | 2 | 2 | 2 | 2 | 2 | 2 | 2 | 2 | 2 | 3 | 4 | 3 | 3 | 3 | 3 | 4 | 3 | 3 | 3 | 3 | 3 | 3 | 3 | 2 | 2 |

Source: WorldFootball.com
A = Away; H = Home; W = Win; D = Draw; L = Loss

=== Results ===
| Game | Date | Opponent | Venue | Result | Attendance | Goalscorers | Match Report |
|---|---|---|---|---|---|---|---|
| 1 | 8 August 2009 | Bury | Gigg Lane | 3–0 | 2,998 | Pitman 17', Robinson 39', Molesley 50' | Match Report |
| 2 | 15 August 2009 | Rotherham United | Dean Court | 1–0 | 5,091 | Garry 45' | Match Report |
| 3 | 18 August 2009 | Aldershot Town | Dean Court | 1–0 | 5,556 | Pearce 48' | Match Report |
| 4 | 22 August 2009 | Northampton Town | Sixfields Stadium | 0–2 | 4,102 | | Match Report |
| 5 | 29 August 2009 | Crewe Alexandra | Dean Court | 1–0 | 4,563 | Feeney 51' | Match Report |
| 6 | 5 September 2009 | Torquay United | Plainmoor | 2–1 | 3,881 | Pitman 49', Fletcher 87' | Match Report |
| 7 | 12 September 2009 | Lincoln City | Dean Court | 3–1 | 5,385 | Pitman 7', Igoe 20', 61' | Match Report |
| 8 | 19 September 2009 | Darlington | The Darlington Arena | 2–0 | 1,999 | Pitman 15' 83' (1 Pen) | Match Report |
| 9 | 26 September 2009 | Burton Albion | Dean Court | 1–0 | 6,327 | Pitman 86' | Match Report |
| 10 | 29 September 2009 | Hereford United | Edgar Street | 1–2 | 2,104 | Fletcher 60' | Match Report |
| 11 | 3 October 2009 | Port Vale | Vale Park | 0–0 | 4,905 | | Match Report |
| 12 | 10 October 2009 | Chesterfield | Dean Court | 1–2 | 5,896 | Hollands 75' | Match Report |
| 13 | 17 October 2009 | Accrington Stanley | Crown Ground | 1–0 | 1,858 | Hollands 76' | Match Report |
| 14 | 24 October 2009 | Grimsby Town | Dean Court | 3–1 | 5,270 | Connell 27', Linwood 34' (OG), Pitman 87' | Match Report |
| 15 | 31 October 2009 | Rochdale | Dean Court | 0–4 | 6,378 | | Match Report |
| 16 | 14 November 2009 | Bradford City | Valley Parade | 1–1 | 11,732 | Pitman 33' | Match Report |
| 17 | 21 November 2009 | Macclesfield Town | Moss Rose | 2–1 | 1,413 | Pitman 45'+1, 78' | Match Report |
| 18 | 24 November 2009 | Dagenham & Redbridge | Dean Court | 0–0 | 6,881 | | Match Report |
| 19 | 1 December 2009 | Barnet | Underhill Stadium | 1–1 | 2,030 | Pitman 44' | Match Report |
| 20 | 5 December 2009 | Shrewsbury Town | Dean Court | 1–0 | 4,652 | Dunfield 85' (o.g.) | Match Report |
| 21 | 12 December 2009 | Morecambe | Christie Park | 0–5 | 2,034 | | Match Report |
| 22 | 26 December 2009 | Cheltenham Town | Whaddon Road | 1–0 | 4,114 | Feeney 57' | Match Report |
| 23 | 28 December 2009 | Torquay United | Dean Court | 2–1 | 7,626 | Feeney 84', Pitman 90'+5 (Pen) | Match Report |
| 24 | 2 January 2010 | Northampton Town | Dean Court | 0–2 | 5,715 | | Match Report |
| 25 | 16 January 2010 | Bury | Dean Court | 1–2 | 4,516 | Pitman 90'+2 | Match Report |
| 26 | 23 January 2010 | Aldershot Town | Recreation Ground | 1–2 | 4,387 | Pitman 61' (Pen) | Match Report |
| 27 | 30 January 2010 | Crewe Alexandra | Alexandra Stadium | 2–1 | 3,741 | Fletcher 22', Robinson 63' | Match Report |
| 28 | 2 February 2010 | Rotherham United | Don Valley Stadium | 3–1 | 3,180 | Pitman 47', Hollands 59', 67' | Match Report |
| 29 | 6 February 2010 | Cheltenham Town | Dean Court | 0–0 | 5,259 | | Match Report |
| 30 | 9 February 2010 | Notts County | Dean Court | 2–1 | 5,472 | Hollands 2', 35' | Match Report |
| 31 | 13 February 2010 | Dagenham & Redbridge | Victoria Road | 0–1 | 2,215 | | Match Report |
| 32 | 20 February 2010 | Macclesfield Town | Dean Court | 1–1 | 4,549 | Connell 85' | Match Report |
| 33 | 23 February 2010 | Barnet | Dean Court | 3–0 | 4,019 | Fletcher 59', Pitman 61', 76' | Match Report |
| 34 | 27 February 2010 | Shrewsbury Town | New Meadow | 0–1 | 6,061 | | Match Report |
| 35 | 6 March 2010 | Morecambe | Dean Court | 1–0 | 5,103 | Robinson 18' | Match Report |
| 36 | 15 March 2010 | Notts County | Meadow Lane | 2–2 | 6,120 | Pitman 50', Goulding 90'+3 | Match Report |
| 37 | 20 March 2010 | Grimsby Town | Blundell Park | 2–3 | 4,428 | Bradbury 42', Feeney 62' | Match Report |
| 38 | 27 March 2010 | Accrington Stanley | Dean Court | 2–0 | 5,413 | Feeney 18', Pitman 79' | Match Report |
| 39 | 3 April 2010 | Bradford City | Dean Court | 1–0 | 6,239 | Pitman 41' | Match Report |
| 40 | 5 April 2010 | Rochdale | Spotland Stadium | 0–0 | 5,027 | | Match Report |
| 41 | 10 April 2010 | Lincoln City | Sincil Bank | 1–2 | 3,040 | Pitman 70' | Match Report |
| 42 | 13 April 2010 | Hereford United | Dean Court | 2–1 | 6,128 | Pitman 32', 77' (1 Pen) | Match Report |
| 43 | 17 April 2010 | Darlington | Dean Court | 2–0 | 6,464 | Robinson 56', Pitman 71' (Pen) | Match Report |
| 44 | 24 April 2010 | Burton Albion | Pirelli Stadium | 2–0 | 3,977 | Pitman 66', Connell 90' | Match Report |
| 45 | 1 May 2010 | Port Vale | Dean Court | 4–0 | 9,055 | Pitman 53', Connell 76', 81', McQuoid 86' | Match Report |
| 46 | 8 May 2010 | Chesterfield | Saltergate | 1–2 | 4,998 | Talbot 42' (o.g.) | Match Report |

=== League Cup ===
| Round | Date | Opponent | Venue | Result | Attendance | Goalscorers | Match Report |
|---|---|---|---|---|---|---|---|
| 1 | 11 August 2009 | Millwall | The Den | 0–4 | 3,552 | | Match Report |

=== FA Cup ===
| Round | Date | Opponent | Venue | Result | Attendance | Goalscorers | Match Report |
|---|---|---|---|---|---|---|---|
| 1 | 7 November 2009 | Chesterfield | Saltergate | 3–1 | 3,277 | Igoe 8', Connell 28', 76 | Match Report |
| 2 | 28 November 2009 | Notts County | Dean Court | 1–2 | 6,082 | Pitman 38' | Match Report |

=== Football League Trophy ===
| Round | Date | Opponent | Venue | Result | Attendance | Goalscorers | Match Report |
|---|---|---|---|---|---|---|---|
| 1 | 1 September 2009 | Yeovil Town | Dean Court | 2–1 | 2,655 | Pitman 45', Connell 66' | Match Report |
| 2 | 6 October 2009 | Northampton Town | Sixfields Stadium | 1–2 | 1,718 | Hollands 33' | Match Report |

== Squad statistics ==
Appearances for competitive matches only

| No. | Pos. | Name | League | | FA Cup | | League Cup | | Total | | Discipline | |
| No. | Pos. | Name | Apps | Goals | Apps | Goals | Apps | Goals | Apps | Goals | Yellow card | Red card |
|---|---|---|---|---|---|---|---|---|---|---|---|---|
| 1 | GK | (Iraq) Shwan Jalal | 44 | 0 | 1 | 0 | 1 | 0 | 46 | 0 | 1 | 0 |
| 2 | DF | (Australia) Scott Guyett | 6 (3) | 0 | 0 | 0 | 0 | 0 | 6 (3) | 0 | 0 | 0 |
| 3 | DF | (England) Ryan Garry | 33 (1) | 1 | 2 | 0 | 1 | 0 | 36 (1) | 1 | 5 | 0 |
| 4 | DF | (England) Shaun Cooper | 6 | 0 | 0 | 0 | 0 | 0 | 6 | 0 | 0 | 0 |
| 5 | DF | (England) Jason Pearce | 39 | 1 | 2 | 0 | 1 | 0 | 42 | 1 | 7 | 0 |
| 6 | MF | (England) Marvin Bartley | 24 (10) | 0 | 1 (1) | 0 | 0 (1) | 0 | 25 (12) | 0 | 8 | 1 |
| 7 | MF | (England) Sammy Igoe | 15 (6) | 2 | 2 | 0 | 1 | 1 | 18 (6) | 3 | 0 | 0 |
| 8 | MF | (England) Anton Robinson | 43 (1) | 4 | 2 | 0 | 1 | 0 | 46 (1) | 4 | 5 | 0 |
| 9 | FW | (Jersey) Brett Pitman | 46 | 26 | 2 | 1 | 1 | 0 | 49 | 27 | 7 | 0 |
| 10 | MF | (England) Alan Connell | 19 (19) | 5 | 2 | 2 | 0 | 0 | 21 (19) | 7 | 0 | 0 |
| 11 | MF | (England) Liam Feeney | 44 | 5 | 2 | 0 | 1 | 0 | 47 | 5 | 2 | 0 |
| 13 | GK | (England) Ryan Pryce | 0 | 0 | 0 | 0 | 0 | 0 | 0 | 0 | 0 | 0 |
| 14 | MF | (England) Danny Hollands | 37 (2) | 6 | 1 (1) | 0 | 0 | 0 | 38 (3) | 6 | 8 | 0 |
| 16 | MF | (England) Anthony Edgar | 2 (1) | 0 | 0 | 0 | 0 | 0 | 2 (1) | 0 | 0 | 0 |
| 16 | DF | (Wales) Rhoys Wiggins | 19 | 0 | 0 | 0 | 0 | 0 | 19 | 0 | 2 | 0 |
| 17 | MF | (Northern Ireland) Josh McQuoid | 9 (20) | 1 | 0 (2) | 0 | 0 (1) | 0 | 9 (23) | 1 | 0 | 0 |
| 19 | FW | (England) Jeff Goulding | 3 (14) | 1 | 0 | 0 | 1 | 0 | 4 (14) | 1 | 2 | 1 |
| 20 | MF | (England) Mark Molesley | 10 | 1 | 0 | 0 | 1 | 0 | 11 | 1 | 3 | 0 |
| 22 | MF | (Wales) Joe Partington | 4 (7) | 0 | 0 | 0 | 0 | 0 | 4 (7) | 0 | 2 | 0 |
| 23 | FW | (England) Lee Bradbury | 43 (1) | 1 | 2 | 0 | 1 | 0 | 45 (1) | 1 | 10 | 0 |
| 24 | MF | (England) George Webb | 0 (1) | 0 | 0 | 0 | 0 | 0 | 0 (1) | 0 | 0 | 0 |
| 26 | GK | (Czech Republic) Marek Štěch | 1 | 0 | 0 | 0 | 0 | 0 | 1 | 0 | 0 | 0 |
| 28 | DF | (Scotland) Warren Cummings | 27 (7) | 0 | 2 | 0 | 1 | 0 | 29 (7) | 0 | 5 | 1 |
| 29 | FW | (England) Jayden Stockley | 0 (2) | 0 | 0 | 0 | 0 | 0 | 0 (2) | 0 | 0 | 0 |
| 30 | GK | (England) Dan Thomas | 1 (1) | 0 | 1 | 0 | 0 | 0 | 2 (1) | 0 | 0 | 0 |
| 31 | DF | (England) Jason Tindall | 0 | 0 | 0 | 0 | 0 | 0 | 0 | 0 | 0 | 0 |
| 33 | FW | (England) Steve Fletcher | 32 (14) | 4 | 0 (2) | 0 | 0 (1) | 0 | 32 (17) | 4 | 3 | 0 |

== See also ==
- 2009–10 in English football
- A.F.C. Bournemouth
