= Ryan Pryce =

Ryan Pryce may refer to:

- Ryan Pryce (Lost), a character on the American TV series Lost
- Ryan Pryce (footballer) (born 1989), English football goalkeeper
