= Paul Dixon (footballer, born 1986) =

Scottish footballer born 1986

Personal information
- Full name: Paul Andrew Dixon
- Date of birth: 22 November 1986 (age 39)
- Place of birth: Aberdeen, Scotland
- Positions: Left-back; centre-back

Youth career
- 1994–1999: Monifieth Athletic
- 1999–2005: Dundee

Senior career*
Years	Team	Apps	(Gls)
2005–2008	Dundee	92	(2)
2008–2012	Dundee United	121	(4)
2012–2015	Huddersfield Town	85	(0)
2015–2017	Dundee United	60	(1)
2017–2018	Grimsby Town	29	(0)
2018–2022	Falkirk	81	(4)
2022–2023	Peterhead	8	(0)
Total		476	(11)

International career^{‡}
2007	Scotland U21	2	(0)
2012	Scotland	3	(0)
- * Club domestic league appearances and goals as of 11 June 2022 (UTC) ‡ National team caps and goals as of 23:14, 3 May 2014 (UTC)

Paul Andrew Dixon (born 22 November 1986) is a Scottish former professional footballer who played as a defender.

Dixon has notably played in the Scottish Premiership for Dundee United on several occasions, he also played in England in the Football League with Huddersfield Town and Grimsby Town, as well as back in the Scottish Football League with Dundee, Falkirk and Peterhead. He announced his retirement in March 2023 following a serious knee injury.

He is a former Scotland national football team international having earned 3 caps in 2012 whilst a Huddersfield player. He was also previously capped by at Scotland U21 level.

== Club career ==
=== Dundee ===
Born in Aberdeen, Dixon played youth football for Monifieth Athletic before he joined the youth teams of Dundee at age of 12. Dixon then progressed through the ranks at the Dens' youth system.

==== 2005–06 season ====
Ahead of the 2005–06 season, Dixon was promoted to the Dundee's first team by manager Jim Duffy. He later reflected on getting first team, saying: "the club who gave me my break and helped me develop and mature as a player, I will always be grateful. Dundee were in financial trouble themselves when I was there and going into administration meant they had to rely on some of the younger players like myself. I went on to play more than 100 times for them, and that was fantastic grounding." Dixon made his professional debut for the Dens, starting the whole game, in a 2–0 win against East Stirlingshire in the first round of the Scottish Challenge Cup match on 31 July 2005. He made his league debut for Dundee, starting a match before being substituted at half–time, in a 3–2 win against St. Mirren in the opening game of the season. After a slow start, Dixon soon won his first team place for the Dens, playing in the left–back position. He then helped Dundee kept five consecutive clean sheets in five matches 31 December 2005 and 21 January 2005.

On 21 January 2006, Dixon scored his first goal for Dundee, in a 3–0 win at Brechin City. On 3 February 2006, he was rewarded with a contract extension until the summer of 2008, along with eight other youngsters. On the last game of the season, Dixon scored his second goal of the season, in a 3–1 win against Queen of the South. At the end of the 2005–06 season, he made thirty–nine appearances and scoring two times in all competitions.

==== 2006–07 season ====
Ahead of the 2006–07 season, Dixon's performance attracted interests from clubs in England and Scotland. He continued as a first team regular, playing in the left–back position. Dixon started in every matches since the start of the 2006–07 season until he missed one match due to a foot injury in November.

But Dixon made his return from injury, starting the whole game, in a 2–0 loss against Queen of the South on 18 November 2006. He helped Dundee kept four consecutive clean sheets in four league matches between 2 January 2007 and 3 February 2007. In a match against St Johnstone on 25 March 2007, Dixon received his first sending off in his professional football career, for a second bookable offence, in a 2–0 loss. After serving a one match suspension for accumulating five yellow cards, he returned to the starting lo the line–up, in a 3–2 win against Ross County on 7 April 2007. At the end of the 2006–07 season, Dixon made thirty–seven appearances in all competitions.

==== 2007–08 season ====
Ahead of the 2007–08 season, Dixon was the subject of a failed move by Norwich City, who had Jim Duffy – the then-Dundee manager who gave Dixon his début – as assistant manager. However, the move fell through when Dundee demanded Norwich City to put all of the money up front and he stayed at the Dens. Following this, Dixon expressed optimism over Dundee's title chances. He continued to remain in the first team place, playing in the left–back position.

In a match against Clyde on 11 November 2007, Dixon scored an own goal, just four minutes from the end of the game, as the Dens loss 1–0. This caused him to be placed on the substitute bench for two months before he won his first team place. At the end of the 2007–08 season, he made thirty–six appearances in all competitions.

With his contract expiring at the end of the 2007–08 season, Dixon continued to remain in the transfer speculation spotlight when Kilmarnock's bid to sign him on the last day of the January transfer window was rebuffed. Despite announcing his intention to make a decision at the end of the 2007–08 season, however, on 30 April 2008, he stated his intention to leave Dens Park at the end of his contract.

=== Dundee United ===
City rivals Dundee United emerged as favourites to sign him. On 23 June 2008, Dixon was unveiled as a Dundee United player. As a result of the move, both clubs agreed to a £25k compensation deal.

==== 2008–09 season ====
On 23 September 2008, he made his debut for the Tangerines, starting the whole game, in a 2–0 win against Airdrieonians in the third round of the League Cup. Four days later on 27 September 2008, Dixon made his league debut for Dundee United, in a 3–0 victory over Hearts. In his first six matches for United, the club conceded just once – an own goal by fellow defender Lee Wilkie. Following this, he quickly established himself in the first team, playing in the left–back position and made impressive performances in a number of matches. Dixon then set up two goals in two matches between 4 November 2008 and 8 November 2008 against Rangers and Aberdeen. His assist against Rangers on 4 November 2008 earned him comparison to Rory Delap, a suggestion that he rejected. A month later, against Rangers on 13 December 2008, he set up two goals, as Dundee United drew 2–2.

Dixon scored his first goal for Dundee United, a curling free-kick, against Celtic during a 2–2 draw on 3 January 2009. He provided double assists in two matches against Celtic and Hibernian between 22 March 2009 and 4 April 2009. In a match against Kilmarnock on 18 April 2009, Dixon received a straight red card in the 86th minute for a foul on Danny Invincibile, as the Tangerines drew 0–0. After serving a one match suspension, he returned to the starting line–up, in a 1–1 draw against Aberdeen on 7 May 2009. At the end of the 2008–09 season, Dixon made thirty–three appearances and scoring once in all competitions. Such was his progress in his first season at Tannadice that he won the Fans' Young Player of the Year award.

==== 2009–10 season ====
At the start of the 2009–10 season, Dixon started in the first nine matches of the season, playing in the left–back position. In the second round of the Scottish League Cup against Alloa Athletic on 25 August 2009, he set up the second goal of the game, in a 2–0 win. However, in a match against Hibernian on 3 October 2009, Dixon played 64 minutes before being substituted in the 64th minute, due to suffering from a knee injury. After missing two matches, Dixon made his return to the starting line–up, in a 2–0 win against Kilmarnock on 7 November 2009. Three weeks later, on 28 November 2009, he set up two goals, in a 2–2 draw against Motherwell.

Following his return from injury, Dixon regained his first team place, playing in the left–back position. After missing three match with an injury in February, he made his return to the starting line–up, in a 3–0 win against Falkirk on 27 February 2010. His good form over the first half of the season earned the left back a contract extension on 4 March 2010, when Dixon extended his contract with Dundee United until June 2012. However, his return was short–lived when he received a straight red card for a reckless challenge on Motherwell player Jim O'Brien, in a 3–0 home victory over Motherwell on 27 March 2010. After serving a one match suspension, Dixon made his return to the starting line–up, in a 0–0 draw against St Johnstone on 6 April 2010.

However, his return was short–lived when he suffered a foot injury and was substituted in the 16th minute, as the Tangerines won 2–0 against Raith Rovers in the semi–finals of the Scottish Cup to reach the final. After the match, it was announced that Dixon would be out for the rest of the 2009–10 season. Despite Dundee United winning the final, he, however, did not receive the winner's medal, having played two Scottish Cup matches prior to the injury. At the end of the 2009–10 season, Dixon made a total of 30 appearances all starts during the 2009–10 season including 25 in the league.

==== 2010–11 season ====
Ahead of the 2010–11 season, it was revealed that Dixon didn't need a surgery on his foot injury and was expected to return in the pre–season. He recovered from his injury and appeared three times in Dundee United's pre–season friendly matches. Dixon made his European debut in the first leg of the UEFA Europa League play–off round against Greek side AEK Athens, and 25 minutes to the match, he clashed heads with Sanel Jahić, but he continued to play for the rest of the match, as the Tangerines loss 1–0. In the return leg, Dixon set up a goal for Jon Daly, but the results wasn't enough for Dundee United, as they loss 2–1 on aggregate and was out of the tournament. He continued to be a first team regular, playing in the left–back position.

During a 1–1 draw against Aberdeen on 1 January 2011, Dixon was involved in a tackle that saw Yoann Folly injured in the 65th minute that subsequently saw him retired from professional football. After the match, he visited the hospital to see Folly and apologised for his action over the tackle. During the match, Dixon suffered a knock, but he quickly recovered. However, he suffered a calf injury and was substituted in the 27th minute, as Dundee United went on to beat Ross County 4–3 on penalties in the fourth round replay of the Scottish Cup. After being out for two weeks, Dixon scored on his return from injury, in a 3–1 win against Hamilton Academical in the fifth round of the Scottish Cup. In a match against Inverness Caledonian Thistle on 1 March 2011, he started the whole game in the centre–back position to help Dundee United win 2–0. However, Dixon missed two matches, due to an illness. He made his return from illness, starting the whole game, in a 2–2 draw against Motherwell in the quarter–finals of the Scottish Cup. Dixon then set up two goals in two matches between 2 April 2011 and 6 April 2011.

Having served a two match suspension, he returned to the starting line–up, in a 4–1 loss against Celtic on 1 May 2011. In a follow–up match, Dixon helped the Tangerines rebounded by setting up two goals for Daly, who scored a hat–trick, in a 4–0 win. His contributions at Dundee United saw them earn a spot in the UEFA Europa League. At the end of the 2010–11 season, he made thirty–nine appearances and scoring once in all competitions.

==== 2011–12 season ====
At the start of the 2011–12 season, Dixon played in both legs of the UEFA Europa League second qualifying round against Polish side Śląsk Wrocław, as Dundee United drew 3–3 but the Tangerines were eliminated on away goals. Since the start of the 2011–12 season, he continued to regain his first team place, playing in the left–back position.

On 29 October 2011 Dixon scored his first goal of the season with the opener on 13 minutes, in a 4–1 away victory over Dunfermline Athletic. He then scored a 90th-minute equaliser, in a 1–1 away draw against Kilmarnock at Rugby Park on 17 December 2011 with a. The next two matches saw Dixon set up two goals, coming against Hibernian and St. Mirren. His performance was praised by teammate Jon Daly for his delivery, calling him an "attacking fullback". He, once again, set up the opening goal of the game, in a 1–1 draw against Motherwell, followed up by a hat–trick assists, in a 5–1 win against St Johnstone. Dixon scored his third goal of the season, scoring in the 58th-minute strike, in a 4–0 home win against Kilmarnock on 21 February 2012. Having started in every matches since the 2011–12 season, he missed one match, due to receiving a suspension for accumulating five yellow cards.

But Dixon made his return to the starting line–up, in a 3–0 win against Inverness Caledonian Thistle on 5 March 2012. In a follow–up match against Rangers, he set up the opening goal of the game, in a 2–1 win. The last two match saw Dundee United win both matches, in which Dixon set up the only goal of the game, in a 1–0 win against Celtic and the Tangerines finished fourth place in the Scottish Premier League during the 2011–12 season. At the end of the 2011–12 season, he made forty–four appearances and scoring three times in all competitions. For his performance, Dixon was named PFA Scotland SPL Team of the Year.

After the match, Dixon gave his farewell to Dundee United supporters, with his intentions to leave the Tangerines, with his contract expiring at the end of the 2011–12 season. By the time he left Dundee United, he made 142 appearances for the Tangerines and scoring five goals in the process.

=== Huddersfield Town ===
Dixon left Dundee at the end of his contract in June 2012 to sign for newly promoted Football League Championship side Huddersfield Town on a three-year contract, becoming the club's second signing of the 2012–13 season after a capture of Republic of Ireland star Sean Scannell on 22 June just a few days earlier. Upon joining the club, he was given the number 3 shirt by manager Simon Grayson on 12 July 2012 when the squad returned to training for the 2012–13 season.

==== 2012–13 season ====
Dixon made his Huddersfield Town début in the League Cup first round 2–0 away defeat at Preston North End on 13 August 2012, playing the full 90 minutes of the tie. He made his league début in the 1–0 defeat by Cardiff City at the Cardiff City Stadium on 17 August. Since joining the club, Dixon quickly became a first team regular, playing in the left–back position.

However, he suffered a knock that saw his playing time reduced, coming from the substitute bench throughout October. But Dixon soon won his first team place back for the next six matches for Huddersfield Town. This last until he was dropped from the squad, as well as, being suspended for accumulating five yellow cards. After missing three matches, Dixon made his return, coming on as a 70th-minute substitute, in a 0–0 draw against Sheffield Wednesday on 29 December 2012. However, he found himself placed on the substitute bench for four matches, due to competitions from Calum Woods.

Dixon made his return to the starting line–upon 23 February 2013, in a 0–0 draw against Ipswich Town. Following this, he managed to dispatch the first choice left–back role from Woods for the rest of the season. In a match against Wolverhampton Wanderers on 13 April 2013, Dixon set up the equalising goal, which saw the club won 3–1. At the end of the 2012–13 season, Dixon made forty appearances in all competitions.

==== 2013–14 season ====
At the start of the 2013–14 season, Dixon found himself competing with Woods and Jake Carroll over the left–back position and saw him dropped for five matches. But he made his return to the starting line–up, playing in the left–midfield position, in a 2–1 win against Charlton Athletic on 17 September 2013. However, after being dropped for three matches, Dixon made his return to the starting line–up, playing in the left–back position, in a 2–1 loss against Leicester City on 19 October 2013, in what turns out to be 300th appearance in his professional football career.

Following his return, he began rotating in playing either left–back position and left–midfield position for the rest of the 2013–14 season. Dixon then set up a goal for Martin Paterson, who went on to score twice, in a 3–2 loss against Burnley on 1 January 2014. The January transfer window saw him linked with a return to Scotland, with Celtic interested in signing him, but manager Neil Lennon dismissed of the move happening and he ended up staying at Huddersfield Town. During a 5–1 loss against Leeds United on 1 February 2014, Dixon suffered a hip injury and was substituted in the 70th minute.

But he quickly recovered and made his return to the starting line–up, in a 1–0 win against Wigan Athletic on 8 February 2014. In a match against Barnsley on 1 March 2014, Dixon set up the fifth goal of the game, in a 5–0 win. He made 32 successive starts for the club until missing one match, due to tactical reasons for a match against Derby County on 12 April 2014. But Dixon made his return to the starting line–up in the left–back position, in a 1–1 draw against Brighton & Hove Albion on 18 April 2014. At the end of the 2013–14 season, he made thirty–nine appearances in all competitions.

==== 2014–15 season ====
At the start of the 2014–15 season, Dixon made five starts for Huddersfield Town, playing four times in the left–back position. However, during the 2014–15 season, he lost his regular left back position to Jack Robinson.

Dixon had to wait for two months to make his first start, in a 2–2 draw against Ipswich Town on 25 October 2014. After two and a half years at the Terriers, he had his contract terminated by mutual consent on 2 February 2015 following interest from another club, revealed to be his former club, Dundee United.

=== Dundee United (second spell) ===
Having left Huddersfield, Dixon signed for Dundee United for a second time, on 2 February 2015, agreeing a contract until the end of the 2016–17 season.

==== 2014–15 season ====
He made his second debut for the Tangerines on 14 February 2015, in a 3–2 defeat away to Kilmarnock. Since joining Dundee United, Dixon quickly regained his first team place, playing in the left–back position. However, he received a straight red card in the 49th minute for handball, in a 1–1 draw against Celtic in the quarter–finals of the Scottish Cup. After the match, the Tangerines did not appeal for Dixon's red card, but he was allowed to play in the Scottish League Cup final.

Dixon started in the Scottish League Cup final against Celtic, where he fouled James Forrest in the penalty box, but it was saved by teammate Radosław Cierzniak, as Dundee United loss 2–0. At the end of the 2014–15 season, Dixon made seventeen appearances in all competitions. Reflecting on his return to the Tangerines, he said: "My personal performances weren't up to the standard I've set myself over the years. It was a combination of things really. There was maybe a lack of confidence from how things happened at Huddersfield Town. Also, it wasn't easy coming into what was a brand new team part of the way through the season."

==== 2015–16 season ====
At the start of the 2015–16 season, Dixon made six starts in the first six league matches for Dundee United. In a match against Motherwell on 8 August 2015, he played a role when his low cross led to Louis Laing scoring an own goal, in a 2–0 win. However, Dixon suffered a hernia injury that kept him out for two months.

On 7 November 2015, he made his return to the starting line–up, in a 2–0 loss against Aberdeen. Following his return from injury, Dixon began playing in the left–midfield position. With the Tangerines in the relegation zone, he stated Dundee United's defence needs improving and confidence about avoiding relegation.

After missing one match, due to suspension for accumulating five yellow cards, Dixon returned to the starting line–up, in a 3–0 loss against Motherwell on 16 February 2016. Following this, he began to play in different positions, as the Tangerines continued remain in the relegation zone. Unfortunately, on 2 May 2016, Dundee United's relegation to the Scottish Championship was confirmed after losing 2–1 against rivals, Dundee. At the end of the 2015–16 season, Dixon made thirty–two appearances in all competitions. Following the Tangerines' relegation, it was expected that he would be leaving Dundee United.

==== 2016–17 season ====
Dixon ended up staying at Dundee United for the 2016–17 season, with the Tangerines now playing in the Scottish Championship. He captained Dundee United two times in the Scottish League Cup group stage to advance to the knockout stage. However, during the match against Inverness Caledonian Thistle on 23 July 2016, Dixon suffered a knee injury that saw him substituted at half–time and was out for two months. On 10 September 2016, he made his return from injury, starting a match against Dunfermline Athletic, only for him to receive a red card for a second bookable offence, in a 3–1 win.

After serving a one match suspension, Dixon returned to the starting line–up, in a 2–1 win against Greenock Morton on 24 September 2016. Following this, he then started in the next six matches, playing in the left–back position. However, during a match against Queen of the South on 5 November 2016, Dixon suffered a knee injury and was substituted in the 43rd minute, as the Tangerines won 4–1. After the match, it was announced that he would be out for six weeks. On 24 December 2016 Dixon returned to the starting line–up, in a 2–1 win against St. Mirren. Following his return, he regained his first team place in the left–back position.

However, by March, Dixon soon lost his first team place, with Jamie Robson preferred instead, and was demoted to the substitute bench. He appeared as an unused substitute in the Scottish Challenge Cup final, as Dundee United won 2–1 against St Mirren to win the tournament. Dixon made a rare start for the Tangerines against Queen of the South on 1 April 2017, where he set up a goal for Thomas Mikkelsen, in a 4–2 loss. On 16 May 2017 Dixon returned to the first team, coming on as a late substitute, in a 2–2 draw against Falkirk in the Scottish Premiership play–offs. In the return leg, he scored his first goal in his second spell at the Tangerines, in a 2–1 win to reach the Premiership play–offs final. Dixon played in both legs of the play–off finals against Hamilton Academical, as Dundee United loss 1–0 on aggregate. At the end of the 2016–17 season, he made twenty–eight appearances and scoring once in all competitions.

Following this, Dixon was released by Dundee United on 3 June 2017.

=== Grimsby Town ===
On 12 July 2017, Dixon joined Grimsby Town on trial. Manager Russell Slade gestured that he would be interested in signing Dixon after he impressed in friendly victories over Scunthorpe United and Barnsley. On 28 July 2017, Dixon signed a two-year contract with the club.

He made his league debut for Grimsby Town, starting the whole game, in a 3–1 win against Chesterfield in the opening game of the season. Since joining the club, Dixon quickly established himself in the first team, playing in the left–back position. This lasted until he missed one match, due to suspension for accumulating five yellow cards. On 1 January 2018 Dixon returned to the first team, starting the whole game, in a 2–0 loss against Crewe Alexandra, having lost his place to Ben Davies. Following this, he regained his first team place in the left–back position for two months. However, Dixon suffered a knee injury that eventually kept him out for the rest of the 2017–18 season. At the end of the 2017–18 season, he made twenty–eight appearances in all competitions.

At the start of the 2018–19 season, Dixon made three starts for Grimsby Town, playing in different positions. However, in a match against Milton Keynes Dons on 21 August 2018, he received a straight red card in the 82nd minute for a foul on Jordan Moore-Taylor, in a 1–1 draw, in what turns out to be his last appearance for the club. Following this, Dixon found his appearances limited under Michael Jolley. He left Grimsby Town by mutual consent on 19 November 2018, after making six appearances in the 2018–19 season.

=== Falkirk ===
Dixon signed a short-term contract with Scottish Championship club Falkirk in December 2018, due to run until the end of the 2018–19 season.

==== 2018–19 season ====
He made his debut for the Bairns, starting the whole game and helping the club kept a clean sheet, in a 1–0 win against Ayr United on 5 January 2019. Since joining Falkirk, Dixon quickly established himself in the first team, playing in the left–back position. In a match against Queen of the South on 2 February 2019, he set up the first goal of the game, in a 3–0 win.

In a match against Greenock Morton on 1 March 2019, Dixon set up the equalising goal before being sent–off for a second bookable offence, in a 1–1 draw. After serving a one match suspension, he returned to the starting line–up, in a 2–1 loss against Ross County on 12 March 2019. At the end of the 2018–19 season, Dixon made sixteen appearances in all competitions. Following this, he signed a two–year contract extension with the Bairns.

==== 2019–20 season ====
At the start of the 2019–20 season, Dixon helped Falkirk kept three consecutive clean sheets between 23 July 2019 and 10 August 2019, in which he set up two goals. He, once again, helped the Bairns kept four consecutive clean sheets in the league between 31 August 2019 and 28 September 2019.

Since the start of the 2019–20 season, Dixon continued to regain his first team place, playing in the left–back position. On 22 November 2019, he scored his first goal of the season, and set up one of the goals, in a 4–1 win against Linlithgow Rose in the third round of Scottish Cup. Dixon then made his 500th appearance in his professional football career, in a 1–1 draw against Airdrieonians on 28 December 2019. His second goal of the season came on 25 January 2020, in a 6–0 win against Forfar Athletic. However, the season was curtailed because of the COVID-19 pandemic, with Falkirk finishing fourth place. At the end of the 2019–20 season, he made thirty–seven appearances and scoring two times in all competitions. Following this, Dixon signed a contract extension with the Bairns.

==== 2020–21 season ====
At the start of the 2020–21 season, Dixon played three times in the Scottish League Cup group stage to help Falkirk advance to the knockout stage. He helped captained the Bairns on three occasions out of the four league matches between 12 December 2020 and 2 January 2021.

Dixon was a first team regular for Falkirk until he missed the rest of the 2020–21 season, due to a knee injury. At the end of the 2020–21 season, Dixon made twenty–one appearances in all competitions. Following this, he signed a one–year contract with the Bairns.

==== 2021–22 season ====
In the first game of the 2021–22 season, Dixon scored his first goal of the season, in a 5–1 win against Albion Rovers in the Scottish League Cup group stage match. On 7 August 2021 he scored his second goal of the season, in a 2–1 win against Peterhead. A week later on 14 August 2021, Dixon scored his third goal of the season, in a 3–0 win against Clyde. Since the start of the 2021–22 season, Dixon continued to remain in the first team, playing in the centre–back position.

However, he suffered a wrist injury that saw him out for two months. On 5 February 2022 Dixon returned to the starting line–up as captain against Queen of the South and set up the equalising goal, in a 1–1 draw. However, he soon lost his first team place and was demoted to the substitute bench. By April, Dixon regained his first team for the remaining matches of the 2021–22 season. At the end of the 2021–22 season, he went on to make twenty–five appearances and scoring three times in all competitions. Following this, Dixon was released Falkirk.

=== Peterhead ===
On 11 June 2022, Dixon joined Scottish League One side Peterhead, signing a one–year contract.

He made his debut for the club, starting the whole game as captain, in a 2–0 loss against Aberdeen in the group stage of the Scottish League Cup match. Six days later against Dumbarton in the group stage of the Scottish League Cup match, Dixon received a straight red card at half–time, in a 2–0 loss. He became a first team regular for Peterhead in the first three months to the season. However, Dixon suffered a seriously knee injury that affected most of his 2022–23 season. On 29 March 2023, he announced his retirement from professional football after failing to recover from a serious knee injury.

== Post Playing career ==
Towards the end of his playing career, Dixon began studying for his UEFA A Licence. He stated his intention to move to coaching once his playing career is over. After leaving Falkirk, Dixon worked for the academy coach at Hearts and Dundee United before he joined Peterhead.

Shortly after retiring from professional football, Dixon was appointed as a dual role as individual coach analyst and under-16s coach for Dundee United.

== International career ==
In August 2007, Dixon was called up to the Scotland under-21 for the first time and made his debut for the under-21 side, playing 82 minutes in a friendly match, in a 1–0 win against the Czech Republic under-21 team. He then made another (and last) appearance for Scotland U21, in a 4–0 loss against Netherlands under-21 team on 16 October 2007. In May 2009, Dixon missed out on a Scotland B call-up due to a clash with United's league fixture.

Dixon was selected in the full Scotland squad for a friendly against the Czech Republic on 3 March 2010, along with Dundee United teammates Andy Webster and Garry Kenneth, but did not play. Two years later, he had to wait until September 2012 to receive another call–up from the national squad. Dixon made his full Scotland debut on 8 September 2012, in a goalless draw with Serbia in Scotland's opening World Cup qualifier of Group A at Hampden Park, playing the full 90 minutes and earning man of the match for his solid performance in defence. He made his second appearance for the national side, making another start, in a 1–1 draw against Macedonia on 11 September 2012. Dixon's third appearance for Scotland came on 14 November 2012 against Luxembourg, where he set up a goal for Jordan Rhodes, who scored twice, in a 2–1 win, in what turns out to be his last appearance. Following this, however, Dixon was not called up to the Scotland's squad by manager Gordon Strachan despite his good performances at Huddersfield Town. He knew that his failure to make the cut into Strachan's Scotland squad made him realised about not playing for Scotland again.

== Personal life ==
Born in Aberdeen, Dixon moved to Dundee when he was a year old. His mother was from Aberdeen, while his father was from the West Country. Growing up, Dixon was a boyhood Dundee United supporter, whom he later joined in 2008. Due to his father being a Bristol Rovers supporter, they attended Football League Second Division play-off final against Huddersfield Town, which Bristol Rovers eventually lost. Outside of football, Dixon is an enthusiastic paddler.

He's married to his wife, Stefany, and together they have two children. The birth of their second child was a factor in Dixon returning to Scotland in 2015.

Following the end of his professional football career, Dixon sought help from charity Back Onside, undergoing therapy for his mental health.

== Club statistics ==
As of match played 1 October 2022

Appearances and goals by club, season and competition
Club	Season	League			National Cup (Note: Cup competitions include the Scottish Cup and FA Cup)		League Cup (Note: League Cup competitions include the Scottish League Cup and League Cup)		Other		Total	
Club	Season	Division	Apps	Goals	Apps	Goals	Apps	Goals	Apps	Goals	Apps	Goals
Dundee	2005–06	Scottish First Division	29	2	6	0	1	0	3 (Note: Appearance(s) in Scottish Challenge Cup)	0	39	2
Dundee	2006–07	Scottish First Division	33	0	2	0	1	0	1	0	37	0
Dundee	2007–08	Scottish First Division	30	0	3	0	3	0	0	0	36	0
Dundee	Total		92	2	11	0	5	0	4	0	112	2
Dundee United	2008–09	Scottish Premier League	29	1	1	0	3	0	—		33	1
Dundee United	2009–10	Scottish Premier League	25	0	3	0	2	0	—		30	0
Dundee United	2010–11	Scottish Premier League	30	0	5	1	2	0	2 (Note: Appearance(s) in Europa League)	0	39	1
Dundee United	2011–12	Scottish Premier League	37	3	3	0	2	0	2	0	44	3
Dundee United	Total		121	4	12	1	9	0	4	0	146	5
Huddersfield Town	2012–13	Championship	37	0	2	0	1	0	—		40	0
Huddersfield Town	2013–14	Championship	37	0	2	0	0	0	—		39	0
Huddersfield Town	2014–15	Championship	11	0	0	0	2	0	—		13	0
Huddersfield Town	Total		85	0	4	0	3	0	0	0	92	0
Dundee United	2014–15	Scottish Premiership	15	0	1	0	1	0	—		17	0
Dundee United	2015–16	Scottish Premiership	28	0	4	0	0	0	—		32	0
Dundee United	2016–17	Scottish Championship	17	0	0	0	4	0	7 (Note: Three appearances in the Scottish Challenge Cup and four appearances and a goal in the Scottish Premiership play-offs)	1	28	1
Dundee United	Total		60	0	5	0	5	0	7	1	77	1
Grimsby Town	2017–18	League Two	26	0	1	0	1	0	—		28	0
Grimsby Town	2018–19	League Two	3	0	0	0	1	0	2 (Note: Appearance(s) in EFL Trophy)	0	6	0
Grimsby Town	Total		29	0	1	0	2	0	2	0	34	0
Falkirk	2018–19	Scottish Championship	16	0	0	0	0	0	0	0	16	0
Falkirk	2019–20	Scottish League One	6	0	0	0	4	0	1	0	11	0
Falkirk	2020–21	Scottish League One	0	0	0	0	0	0	0	0	0	0
Falkirk	2021–22	Scottish League One	0	0	0	0	0	0	0	0	0	0
Falkirk	2022–23	Scottish League One	0	0	0	0	0	0	0	0	0	0
Falkirk	Total		22	0	0	0	4	0	1	0	27	0
Career total			409	6	33	1	28	0	18	1	488	8

== Honours ==
Dundee United

- Scottish Challenge Cup: 2016–17
