= 2012–13 Huddersfield Town A.F.C. season =

Huddersfield Town
2012–13 season
- Chairman: Dean Hoyle
- Manager: Simon Grayson (until 24 January 2013); Mark Lillis (from 24 January 2013 until 14 February 2013); Mark Robins (from 14 February 2013)
- Stadium: John Smith's Stadium
- Championship: 19th
- FA Cup: Fifth round (eliminated by Wigan Athletic)
- League Cup: First round (eliminated by Preston North End)
- Top goalscorer: League: James Vaughan (14); All: James Vaughan (14)
- Highest home attendance: 21,614 vs. Barnsley (3 May 2013)
- Lowest home attendance: 11,495 vs. Leicester City (26 January 2013)
- Biggest win: 3–0 vs Millwall (20 April 2013)
- Biggest defeat: 1–6 vs Leicester City (1 January 2013)
Home colours	Away colours	Third colours

The 2012–13 campaign was Huddersfield Town's first season back in the second tier of English football, since the 2000–01 season.

They qualified to play in the 2012–13 Football League Championship after they beat Sheffield United in the final at Wembley Stadium on 26 May 2012. After the match finished 0–0 after extra time, the Terriers won the penalty shoot-out 8–7, after every player on the pitch took a penalty. The decisive penalty was taken by the United goalkeeper Steve Simonsen, who saw his penalty go over the crossbar, giving Huddersfield the glory, and promotion to the Football League Championship.

This was meant to be Simon Grayson's first full season in charge of the Terriers, but instead he was sacked on 24 January 2013, following a run of 12 consecutive league games without a win. After Town legend Mark Lillis steadied the ship for 5 games, the Coventry City boss Mark Robins was appointed as the new manager on 14 February 2013.

== Squad at the start of the season ==
Note: Flags indicate national team as defined under FIFA eligibility rules; some limited exceptions apply. Players may hold more than one non-FIFA nationality.

No.	Pos.	Nation	Player
1	GK	ENG	Alex Smithies
2	DF	ENG	Calum Woods
3	DF	SCO	Paul Dixon
4	MF	NIR	Oliver Norwood
5	DF	ENG	Peter Clarke (Captain)
6	DF	IRL	Anthony Gerrard
7	MF	IRL	Sean Scannell
8	MF	ENG	Adam Clayton
9	FW	ENG	Lee Novak
10	MF	ENG	Oscar Gobern
11	MF	ENG	Danny Ward
12	DF	ENG	Tom Clarke
13	GK	ENG	Ian Bennett
15	DF	SCO	Murray Wallace
16	MF	CAN	Scott Arfield
17	FW	SCO	Jordan Rhodes
19	FW	IRL	Alan Lee

No.	Pos.	Nation	Player
22	MF	ENG	Anton Robinson
24	MF	ENG	Keith Southern
25	GK	IRL	Nick Colgan
27	FW	ENG	Kallum Higginbotham
29	DF	ENG	Liam Ridehalgh (on loan at Chesterfield)
30	FW	ENG	Jimmy Spencer
31	MF	ENG	Chris Atkinson
32	DF	ENG	Jack Hunt
33	DF	WAL	Joel Lynch
35	GK	ENG	Lloyd Allinson
36	MF	ENG	Matt Crooks
37	FW	ENG	Max Leonard
38	DF	ENG	James Burke
39	MF	ENG	Jordan Sinnott
40	MF	ENG	Israel Johnson
41	FW	ENG	Connor Loftus

== Kit ==
The 2012–13 season was the club's second with technical kit supplier Umbro, and their first with home sponsor Rekorderlig Cider. Radian B continued their away shirt sponsorship. The Club introduced new home and away kits, and retained the away kit from the previous season as a third kit. Alternate shorts and socks were available for all outfield kits in the event of a colour clash, however in away games where the home kit could have theoretically been worn, the away kit was worn instead.

The home shirt is the club's traditional blue and white stripes but with a chequered pattern of light and darker blue within the stripes, and was worn for the first time in the pre-season friendly at Guiseley. It was worn with white shorts and black socks, except in the away games at Crystal Palace and Burnley, in which it was worn with white socks. The away shirt is dark navy with a broad white stripe across the shoulders and collar, and was worn for the first time in the pre-season friendly at Kilmarnock. The goalkeeper kits featured a striking geometric pattern across the front.

Supplier: Umbro
Sponsor(s): Rekorderlig Cider (home), Radian B (away)

Home	Home alternate	Away	Away alternate	Third	Third alternate	GK home	GK away	GK third

Last updated: 11 September 2012.
Source: Npower Championship 2012-12 – Historical Football Kits

== Review ==
Town made their first signing of the summer on 22 June, with the transfer of winger/striker Sean Scannell from Crystal Palace for an undisclosed fee. On 27 June, Scotland under-21 international defender Paul Dixon signed on a free transfer from Dundee United. Young midfielder Oliver Norwood signed from Manchester United on a 3-year-deal, beating Championship rivals Barnsley to his signature. On 6 July, Simon Grayson raided his former club Leeds United to sign Adam Clayton on an undisclosed fee, just 2 years after bringing him to Elland Road. On 11 July, Welsh defender Joel Lynch joined after being released by Nottingham Forest. On 26 July, Blackpool midfielder Keith Southern signed on a 2-year-deal, reuniting him with Simon Grayson, who managed him at Bloomfield Road. On 7 August, defender Anthony Gerrard was signed on a 3-year-deal from fellow Championship side Cardiff City in a deal believed to be worth £350,000. On 24 August, Norwich City striker James Vaughan joined the club on a season-long loan deal. As the transfer window shut on 31 August, Town signed winger Adam Hammill on loan from Wolverhampton Wanderers until January 2013. On 28 September, after being snubbed by the club on transfer deadline day, Jermaine Beckford joined on a 3-month loan deal from divisional rivals, Leicester City. On 8 November, Welsh international striker Simon Church joined on a month's loan from Premier League side Reading. He returned to Reading on 31 December after his extension expired. On 8 January 2013, Beckford's Leicester teammate, Neil Danns joined on loan for the remainder of the season. On 22 February, new manager Mark Robins brought back a familiar face to the Terriers, by signing recently capped Jamaican international Theo Robinson on loan from Derby County for the remainder of the season. On 11 April, Town signed striker Daniel Carr from non-league side Dulwich Hamlet for £100,000, which will see the striker join up with the Terriers once this season has concluded. On 26 April, Irish youngster Jake Carroll was signed from St Patrick's Athletic on an undisclosed fee, and like Carr, will join up with the Terriers after this season is concluded.

On 10 August, Antony Kay became the first departure of the season, when he left to sign a 2-year-deal at Milton Keynes Dons. The following day, defender Jamie McCombe had his contract terminated, which paved the way for a move to Doncaster Rovers. On 24 August, defender Liam Ridehalgh rejoined Chesterfield on a one-month loan deal. His teammate, Chris Atkinson joined him on 12 September. On 30 August, Town fans were left distraught after their prized possession, Jordan Rhodes was sold to their Championship rivals Blackburn Rovers for £8 million, a record selling fee for Town, as well as a record purchasing for Blackburn, and it was also the highest fee paid for a player between 2 non-Premier League clubs. Kallum Higginbotham joined Carlisle United on a 3-month loan deal on 20 September. On 16 October, young striker Jimmy Spencer joined Brentford on a month's loan. On 22 November, as the loan window shut, Ridehalgh was recalled from his loan at Chesterfield and sent on loan to their divisional rivals, Rotherham United. On 5 December, youngster Jordan Sinnott, joined Conference North side Altrincham (managed by his father and ex-Town player, Lee) on loan for a month. On 7 December, young duo Matt Crooks and James Burke joined Radcliffe Borough on a month's loan. Young strike duo Max Leonard and Connor Loftus were sent out on a month's loan to Garforth Town and Mossley on 21 December. Following his return from Carlisle, Kallum Higginbotham still found himself out of the picture at Huddersfield, so joined Scottish Premier League side Motherwell on loan for the rest of the season on 9 January. The following day, Jimmy Spencer went out on loan for the second time, joining Crawley Town for the remainder of the season, but he returned to Huddersfield on 6 February with a knee injury, making no appearances for the Red Devils. As the transfer window shut on 31 January, midfielder Anton Robinson joined League Two leaders Gillingham on loan for the rest of the season. However, he returned to the club on 11 April, after rupturing his anterior cruciate ligaments, which will rule him out of football for 9 months.

== Squad at the end of the season ==
Note: Flags indicate national team as defined under FIFA eligibility rules; some limited exceptions apply. Players may hold more than one non-FIFA nationality.

No.	Pos.	Nation	Player
1	GK	ENG	Alex Smithies
2	DF	ENG	Calum Woods
3	DF	SCO	Paul Dixon
4	MF	NIR	Oliver Norwood
5	DF	ENG	Peter Clarke (Captain)
6	DF	IRL	Anthony Gerrard
7	MF	IRL	Sean Scannell
8	MF	ENG	Adam Clayton
9	FW	ENG	Lee Novak
10	MF	ENG	Oscar Gobern
11	MF	ENG	Danny Ward
12	DF	ENG	Tom Clarke
13	GK	ENG	Ian Bennett
15	DF	SCO	Murray Wallace
16	MF	CAN	Scott Arfield
17	FW	JAM	Theo Robinson (on loan from Derby County)
18	FW	ENG	James Vaughan (on loan from Norwich City)
19	FW	IRL	Alan Lee
20	MF	ENG	Neil Danns (on loan from Leicester City)

No.	Pos.	Nation	Player
21	FW	JAM	Jermaine Beckford (on loan from Leicester City)
22	MF	ENG	Anton Robinson
24	MF	ENG	Keith Southern
25	GK	IRL	Nick Colgan
26	DF	ENG	Tom Smith
27	FW	ENG	Kallum Higginbotham (on loan at Motherwell)
28	MF	ENG	Duane Holmes
29	DF	ENG	Liam Ridehalgh (on loan at Rotherham United)
30	FW	ENG	Jimmy Spencer
31	MF	ENG	Chris Atkinson
32	DF	ENG	Jack Hunt
33	DF	WAL	Joel Lynch
35	GK	ENG	Lloyd Allinson
36	MF	ENG	Matt Crooks
37	FW	ENG	Max Leonard
38	DF	ENG	James Burke
39	MF	ENG	Jordan Sinnott
40	MF	ENG	Israel Johnson
41	FW	ENG	Connor Loftus

== Transfers ==
=== In ===
Date	Pos.	Name	From	Fee
22 June 2012	MF	(Republic of Ireland) Sean Scannell	(England) Crystal Palace	Undisclosed Fee
27 June 2012	DF	(Scotland) Paul Dixon	(Scotland) Dundee United	Free
29 June 2012	MF	(Northern Ireland) Oliver Norwood	(England) Manchester United	Undisclosed Fee
6 July 2012	MF	(England) Adam Clayton	(England) Leeds United	Undisclosed Fee
11 July 2012	DF	(Wales) Joel Lynch	(England) Nottingham Forest	Free
26 July 2012	MF	(England) Keith Southern	(England) Blackpool	Undisclosed Fee
7 August 2012	DF	(Republic of Ireland) Anthony Gerrard	(Wales) Cardiff City	£350,000
11 April 2013	FW	(England) Daniel Carr	(England) Dulwich Hamlet	£100,000
26 April 2013	DF	(Republic of Ireland) Jake Carroll	(Republic of Ireland) St Patrick's Athletic	Undisclosed Fee

=== Loans in ===
Date	Pos.	Name	From	Expiry
24 August 2012	FW	(England) James Vaughan	(England) Norwich City	End of season
31 August 2012	MF	(England) Adam Hammill	(England) Wolverhampton Wanderers	January 2013
28 September 2012	FW	(Jamaica) Jermaine Beckford	(England) Leicester City	December 2012
8 November 2012	FW	(Wales) Simon Church	(England) Reading	December 2012
21 November 2012	FW	(England) Jimmy Spencer	(England) Brentford	Loan Return
22 November 2012	DF	(England) Liam Ridehalgh	(England) Chesterfield	Loan Return
26 November 2012	MF	(England) Chris Atkinson	(England) Chesterfield	Loan Cancelled
7 December 2012	FW	(England) Kallum Higginbotham	(England) Carlisle United	Loan Cancelled
8 January 2013	MF	(England) Neil Danns	(England) Leicester City	End of Season
6 February 2013	FW	(England) Jimmy Spencer	(England) Crawley Town	Loan Cancelled
22 February 2013	FW	(Jamaica) Theo Robinson	(England) Derby County	End of Season
11 April 2013	MF	(England) Anton Robinson	(England) Gillingham	Loan Cancelled

=== Out ===
Date	Pos.	Name	To	Fee
29 May 2012	DF	(England) Greg Pearson		Released
18 June 2012	MF	(England) Gary Roberts	(England) Swindon Town	Free
21 June 2012	FW	(England) Danny Cadamarteri	(England) Carlisle United	Free
21 June 2012	MF	(England) Tommy Miller	(England) Swindon Town	Free
18 July 2012	DF	(England) Nathan Clarke	(England) Leyton Orient	Free
25 July 2012	MF	(England) Aidan Chippendale	(England) Accrington Stanley	Free
1 August 2012	DF	(Scotland) Gary Naysmith	(Scotland) Aberdeen	Free
10 August 2012	DF	(England) Antony Kay	(England) Milton Keynes Dons	Free
11 August 2012	DF	(England) Jamie McCombe	(England) Doncaster Rovers	Free
30 August 2012	FW	(Scotland) Jordan Rhodes	(England) Blackburn Rovers	£8,000,000
25 February 2013	GK	(Canada) Simon Thomas	(Canada) Vancouver Whitecaps	Free

=== Loans out ===
Date	Pos.	Name	To	Expiry
24 August 2012	DF	(England) Liam Ridehalgh	(England) Chesterfield	September 2012
12 September 2012	MF	(England) Chris Atkinson	(England) Chesterfield	October 2012
20 September 2012	FW	(England) Kallum Higginbotham	(England) Carlisle United	December 2012
16 October 2012	FW	(England) Jimmy Spencer	(England) Brentford	November 2012
22 November 2012	DF	(England) Liam Ridehalgh	(England) Rotherham United	December 2012
5 December 2012	MF	(England) Jordan Sinnott	(England) Altrincham	January 2013
7 December 2012	DF	(England) James Burke	(England) Radcliffe Borough	January 2013
7 December 2012	MF	(England) Matt Crooks	(England) Radcliffe Borough	January 2013
21 December 2012	FW	(England) Max Leonard	(England) Garforth Town	January 2013
21 December 2012	FW	(England) Connor Loftus	(England) Mossley	January 2013
9 January 2013	MF	(England) Kallum Higginbotham	(Scotland) Motherwell	End of Season
10 January 2013	FW	(England) Jimmy Spencer	(England) Crawley Town	End of Season
14 January 2013	MF	(England) Adam Hammill	(England) Wolverhampton Wanderers	Loan Expired
31 January 2013	MF	(England) Anton Robinson	(England) Gillingham	End of Season

== Statistics ==
=== Overview ===
Competition	First match	Last match	Starting round	Final position	Record							
Competition	First match	Last match	Starting round	Final position	Pld	W	D	L	GF	GA	GD	Win %
Championship	17 August 2012	4 May 2013	Matchday 1	19th	46	15	13	18	53	73	−20	32.61
FA Cup	5 January 2013	17 February 2013	Third round	Fifth round	4	2	1	1	5	6	−1	50.00
League Cup	13 August 2012	13 August 2012	First round	First round	1	0	0	1	0	2	−2	0.00
Total					51	17	14	20	58	81	−23	33.33

Last updated: 4 May 2013
Source: Competitions

=== League table ===
Pos	Team	Pld	W	D	L	GF	GA	GD	Pts
17	Blackburn Rovers	46	14	16	16	55	62	−7	58
18	Sheffield Wednesday	46	16	10	20	53	61	−8	58
19	Huddersfield Town	46	15	13	18	53	73	−20	58
20	Millwall	46	15	11	20	51	62	−11	56
21	Barnsley	46	14	13	19	56	70	−14	55

Updated to match(es) played on 4 May 2013. Source: BBC Sport
Rules for classification: 1) points; 2) goal difference; 3) number of goals scored.

=== Results summary ===
Overall								Home						Away					
Pld	W	D	L	GF	GA	GD	Pts	W	D	L	GF	GA	GD	W	D	L	GF	GA	GD
46	15	13	18	51	71	−20	58	7	10	6	26	24	+2	8	3	12	25	47	−22

Last updated: 4 May 2013.

=== Result round by round ===
Round	1	2	3	4	5	6	7	8	9	10	11	12	13	14	15	16	17	18	19	20	21	22	23	24	25	26	27	28	29	30	31	32	33	34	35	36	37	38	39	40	41	42	43	44	45	46
Ground	A	H	H	A	H	A	A	H	H	A	H	A	A	H	H	A	H	A	A	H	H	A	A	H	H	A	H	A	H	A	H	A	H	A	A	H	H	A	H	A	H	A	A	H	A	H
Result	L	D	W	D	W	W	W	L	L	W	W	L	L	W	D	W	L	D	L	L	D	L	D	D	D	L	D	L	W	L	D	L	D	W	L	W	L	W	L	L	D	W	L	W	W	D
Position	19	20	12	14	8	6	2	6	8	6	3	6	9	7	7	6	8	10	11	14	15	17	15	15	16	17	17	18	16	17	18	21	20	18	19	16	18	16	19	22	21	19	22	19	18	19

Updated to match(es) played on 4 May 2013. Source:
A = Away; H = Home; W = Win; D = Draw; L = Loss

== Squad statistics ==
=== Appearances and goals ===
As of 4 May 2013

No.	Pos	Nat	Player	Total		Championship		FA Cup		League Cup	
No.	Pos	Nat	Player	Apps	Goals	Apps	Goals	Apps	Goals	Apps	Goals
1	GK	(England) ENG	Alex Smithies	50	0	46	0	3	0	1	0
2	DF	(England) ENG	Calum Woods	30	0	20+7	0	3	0	0	0
3	DF	(Scotland) SCO	Paul Dixon	40	0	29+8	0	2	0	1	0
4	MF	(Northern Ireland) NIR	Oliver Norwood	43	3	37+2	3	2+2	0	0	0
5	DF	(England) ENG	Peter Clarke	47	0	42+1	0	3	0	1	0
6	DF	(Republic of Ireland) IRL	Anthony Gerrard	43	1	32+6	1	4	0	1	0
7	MF	(Republic of Ireland) IRL	Sean Scannell	38	3	22+12	2	3+1	1	0	0
8	MF	(England) ENG	Adam Clayton	46	5	43	4	2	1	1	0
9	FW	(England) ENG	Lee Novak	39	6	23+12	4	1+2	2	1	0
10	MF	(England) ENG	Oscar Gobern	17	0	13+2	0	0+1	0	1	0
11	MF	(England) ENG	Danny Ward	29	2	17+11	2	0	0	1	0
12	DF	(England) ENG	Tom Clarke	1	0	0	0	0	0	0+1	0
13	GK	(England) ENG	Ian Bennett	2	0	0+1	0	1	0	0	0
14	MF	(England) ENG	Adam Hammill	16	2	6+10	2	0	0	0	0
15	DF	(Scotland) SCO	Murray Wallace	7	1	3+3	1	1	0	0	0
16	MF	(Scotland) SCO	Scott Arfield	26	1	9+12	1	4	0	0+1	0
17	FW	(Scotland) SCO	Jordan Rhodes	2	2	2	2	0	0	0	0
17	FW	(Jamaica) JAM	Theo Robinson	6	0	4+2	0	0	0	0	0
18	FW	(England) ENG	James Vaughan	37	14	31+2	14	2+2	0	0	0
19	FW	(Republic of Ireland) IRL	Alan Lee	25	2	1+20	2	2+1	0	0+1	0
20	FW	(Wales) WAL	Simon Church	7	1	7	1	0	0	0	0
20	MF	(England) ENG	Neil Danns	18	2	17	2	1	0	0	0
21	FW	(Jamaica) JAM	Jermaine Beckford	22	9	14+7	8	1	1	0	0
22	MF	(England) ENG	Anton Robinson	2	0	1+1	0	0	0	0	0
24	MF	(England) ENG	Keith Southern	30	1	24+5	1	0	0	1	0
30	FW	(England) ENG	Jimmy Spencer	2	0	0+1	0	0	0	1	0
31	MF	(England) ENG	Chris Atkinson	9	1	3+4	1	2	0	0	0
32	DF	(England) ENG	Jack Hunt	44	0	39+1	0	3	0	1	0
33	DF	(Wales) WAL	Joel Lynch	22	1	20+2	1	0	0	0	0
39	MF	(England) ENG	Jordan Sinnott	3	0	0+1	0	2	0	0	0

=== Top scorers ===
Place	Position	Nation	Number	Name	Championship	FA Cup	League Cup	Total
1	FW	(England)	18	James Vaughan	14	0	0	14
2	FW	(Jamaica)	21	Jermaine Beckford	8	1	0	9
3	FW	(England)	9	Lee Novak	4	2	0	6
4	MF	(England)	8	Adam Clayton	4	1	0	5
5=	MF	(Northern Ireland)	4	Oliver Norwood	3	0	0	3
5=	MF	(Republic of Ireland)	7	Sean Scannell	2	1	0	3
7=	MF	(England)	11	Danny Ward	2	0	0	2
7=	MF	(England)	14	Adam Hammill	2	0	0	2
7=	FW	(Scotland)	17	Jordan Rhodes	2	0	0	2
7=	FW	(Republic of Ireland)	19	Alan Lee	2	0	0	2
7=	MF	(England)	20	Neil Danns	2	0	0	2
12=	DF	(Republic of Ireland)	6	Anthony Gerrard	1	0	0	1
12=	DF	(Scotland)	15	Murray Wallace	1	0	0	1
12=	MF	(Scotland)	16	Scott Arfield	1	0	0	1
12=	FW	(Wales)	20	Simon Church	1	0	0	1
12=	MF	(England)	24	Keith Southern	1	0	0	1
12=	MF	(England)	31	Chris Atkinson	1	0	0	1
12=	DF	(Wales)	33	Joel Lynch	1	0	0	1
12=				Own goals	1	0	0	1
				TOTALS	53	5	0	58

=== Disciplinary record ===
Number	Nation	Position	Name	Championship		FA Cup		League Cup		Total	
Number	Nation	Position	Name	Booked	Sent off (straight red)	Booked	Sent off (straight red)	Booked	Sent off (straight red)	Booked	Sent off (straight red)
18	(England)	FW	James Vaughan	10	0	2	0	0	0	12	0
8	(England)	MF	Adam Clayton	9	0	2	0	0	0	11	0
3	(Scotland)	DF	Paul Dixon	10	0	0	0	0	0	10	0
6	(Republic of Ireland)	DF	Anthony Gerrard	7	1	1	0	0	0	8	1
33	(Wales)	DF	Joel Lynch	8	1	0	0	0	0	8	1
32	(England)	DF	Jack Hunt	6	1	1	0	0	0	7	1
2	(England)	DF	Calum Woods	7	0	0	0	0	0	7	0
24	(England)	MF	Keith Southern	6	1	0	0	0	0	6	1
5	(England)	DF	Peter Clarke	5	0	0	0	1	0	6	0
9	(England)	FW	Lee Novak	4	0	1	0	0	0	5	0
4	(Northern Ireland)	MF	Oliver Norwood	3	0	1	0	0	0	4	0
20	(England)	MF	Neil Danns	4	0	0	0	0	0	4	0
21	(England)	FW	Jermaine Beckford	3	0	0	0	0	0	3	0
10	(England)	MF	Oscar Gobern	2	0	0	0	0	0	2	0
11	(England)	MF	Danny Ward	2	0	0	0	0	0	2	0
14	(England)	MF	Adam Hammill	2	0	0	0	0	0	2	0
16	(Scotland)	MF	Scott Arfield	1	0	1	0	0	0	2	0
19	(Republic of Ireland)	FW	Alan Lee	2	0	0	0	0	0	2	0
1	(England)	GK	Alex Smithies	1	0	0	0	0	0	1	0
20	(Wales)	FW	Simon Church	1	0	0	0	0	0	1	0
			Totals	94	4	9	0	1	0	104	4

== Results ==
=== Pre-season ===
21 July 2012	Guiseley	1–0	Huddersfield Town	Guiseley
15:00	Forrest 15'	Report		Stadium: Nethermoor Park

24 July 2012	A.F.C. Emley	3–1	Huddersfield Town XI	Emley
19:00	Flynn 26'; Wharam 30', 36'	Report	Sinnott	Stadium: Welfare Ground

25 July 2012	Kilmarnock	1–1	Huddersfield Town	Kilmarnock
19:45	Johnson 20'		Rhodes 38'	Stadium: Rugby Park; Attendance: 1,310

27 July 2012	Brighouse Town	0–2	Huddersfield Town XI	Brighouse
19:00			Mullin 20'; Charles 70'	Stadium: Dual Seal Stadium

28 July 2012	Hibernian	2–2	Huddersfield Town	Edinburgh
14:00	Griffiths 27'; Sproule 62'		Novak 12'; Scannell 17'	Stadium: Easter Road; Attendance: 4,600

1 August 2012	Crewe Alexandra	1–0	Huddersfield Town	Crewe
19:30	Dugdale 17'			Stadium: Alexandra Stadium; Attendance: 1,402

3 August 2012	Radcliffe Borough	0–3	Huddersfield Town XI	Radcliffe
19:15			Ridehalgh 9', 14'; Crooks 73'	Stadium: Stainton Park; Attendance: 400

4 August 2012	Oldham Athletic	0–0	Huddersfield Town	Oldham
15:00				Stadium: Boundary Park; Attendance: 1,757

7 August 2012	Chesterfield	0–3	Huddersfield Town	Chesterfield
19:45			Lee 8'; Spencer 23'; Sinnott 88'	Stadium: B2net Stadium

8 August 2012	Huddersfield Town	0–2	Barcelona B	Huddersfield
19:45			Deulofeu 63' (pen.); Araujo 70'	Stadium: John Smith's Stadium; Attendance: 7,951; Referee: Andre Marriner

=== Championship ===
17 August 2012 1	Cardiff City	1–0	Huddersfield Town	Cardiff
19:45	Whittingham (yellow card) 73'; Hudson 90+1'	Report	Clayton (yellow card) 52'; Southern (yellow card) 58'; Gerrard (yellow card) 90+5'	Stadium: Cardiff City Stadium; Attendance: 21,127; Referee: Roger East

21 August 2012 2	Huddersfield Town	1–1	Nottingham Forest	Huddersfield
19:45	Ward (yellow card) 87'; Rhodes 90+4' (pen.)	Report	Halford (yellow card) 51'; Gillett (yellow card) 52'; Cox 68'; Hutchinson (yellow card) 90+5'	Stadium: John Smith's Stadium; Attendance: 15,434; Referee: Neil Swarbrick

25 August 2012 3	Huddersfield Town	2–0	Burnley	Huddersfield
15:00	Lynch 7'; Clayton (yellow card) 38'; Rhodes 58'	Report		Stadium: John Smith's Stadium; Attendance: 15,483; Referee: David Webb

1 September 2012 4	Ipswich Town	2–2	Huddersfield Town	Ipswich
15:00	Drury (yellow card) 50'; Chambers 62'; Chopra 72'	Report	Clayton 36'; Vaughan 80' (yellow card) 85'	Stadium: Portman Road; Attendance: 16,843; Referee: Mick Russell

15 September 2012 5	Huddersfield Town	1–0	Derby County	Huddersfield
15:00	Ward 1'; Dixon (yellow card) 25'; Hunt (yellow card) 75'; Lynch (yellow card) 90+4'		Ward (yellow card) 30'	Stadium: John Smith's Stadium; Attendance: 15,265; Referee: Trevor Kettle

19 September 2012 6	Sheffield Wednesday	1–3	Huddersfield Town	Sheffield
19:45	R. Johnson 37' (yellow card) 71'; Mattock (yellow card) 42' (yellow-red card) 45+6'; Bothroyd (yellow card) 44'; McCabe (yellow card) 90+1'; Pečnik (yellow card) 90+3'		Norwood 16'; Novak 18'; Lynch (red card) 38'; P. Clarke (yellow card) 39'; Gerrard (yellow card) 41'; Clayton 71' (pen.); Dixon (yellow card) 81'	Stadium: Hillsborough Stadium; Attendance: 25,230; Referee: Graham Salisbury

24 September 2012 7	Blackpool	1–3	Huddersfield Town	Blackpool
19:45	Taylor-Fletcher 27'; Crainey (yellow card) 69'		Novak 13'; Vaughan 45' (yellow card) 45+2'; Norwood 48' (yellow card) 79'; Dixon (yellow card) 59'	Stadium: Bloomfield Road; Attendance: 13,886; Referee: Anthony Bates

29 September 2012 8	Huddersfield Town	2–3	Watford	Huddersfield
15:00	Norwood 25'; Southern (yellow card) 60'; Lee 84'		Cassetti (yellow card) 28'; Forestieri 68'; Hall 83'; Deeney 87' (pen.); Smith (yellow card) 90+4'	Stadium: John Smith's Stadium; Attendance: 14,564; Referee: Gary Sutton

2 October 2012 9	Huddersfield Town	0–2	Leicester City	Huddersfield
19:45	Dixon (yellow card) 54'		Knockaert 30', 60' (yellow card) 59'	Stadium: John Smith's Stadium; Attendance: 13,801; Referee: Philip Gibbs

6 October 2012 10	Birmingham City	0–1	Huddersfield Town	Birmingham
15:00	Žigić (red card) 74'; Robinson (yellow card) 90+6'		Beckford 25'; Hunt (yellow card) 90+2'	Stadium: St Andrew's; Attendance: 18,437; Referee: Andy D'Urso

20 October 2012 11	Huddersfield Town	2–1	Wolverhampton Wanderers	Huddersfield
15:00	Vaughan 10' (yellow card) 59'; Beckford 27'; Gerrard (yellow card) 76'; Clayton (yellow card) 85'		Johnson (yellow card) 58'; Ebanks-Blake 63'	Stadium: John Smith's Stadium; Attendance: 18,012; Referee: James Adcock

23 October 2012 12	Peterborough United	3–1	Huddersfield Town	Peterborough
19:45	Boyd 16', 24'; Ntlhe 48' (yellow card) 52'; McCann (yellow card) 87'; Bostwick (yellow card) 90+5'		Hammill 51'	Stadium: London Road Stadium; Attendance: 6,348; Referee: Stuart Attwell

27 October 2012 13	Millwall	4–0	Huddersfield Town	South Bermondsey
15:00	Wood 28', 61'; Dunne (yellow card) 54'; Henry 79'; Trotter 88'		Lynch (yellow card) 42'; Hunt (red card) 86'	Stadium: The Den; Attendance: 11,066; Referee: Graham Scott

3 November 2012 14	Huddersfield Town	1–0	Bristol City	Huddersfield
15:00	Woods (yellow card) 28'; Scannell 43'		Adomah (yellow card) 33'; Fontaine (yellow card) 76'	Stadium: John Smith's Stadium; Attendance: 12,561; Referee: Graham Salisbury

6 November 2012 15	Huddersfield Town	2–2	Blackburn Rovers	Huddersfield
19:45	Novak (yellow card) 11' (goal) 15', 90+5'; Lynch (yellow card) 54'; Clayton (yellow card) 69'		Dann (yellow card) 15'; Rhodes 43'; Murphy 55' (pen.)	Stadium: John Smith's Stadium; Attendance: 14,597; Referee: Roger East

10 November 2012 16	Barnsley	0–1	Huddersfield Town	Barnsley
15:00	Mido (yellow card) 64'		Smithies (yellow card) 11'; Beckford 36'; Church (yellow card) 54'	Stadium: Oakwell; Attendance: 12,130; Referee: Mark Haywood

17 November 2012 17	Huddersfield Town	1–2	Brighton & Hove Albion	Huddersfield
15:00	Norwood (yellow card) 38'; Novak (yellow card) 44'; Lynch (yellow card) 78'; Church 90'		Buckley 5', 40'; Calderón (yellow card) 90+2'	Stadium: John Smith's Stadium; Attendance: 13,299; Referee: Simon Hooper

24 November 2012 18	Charlton Athletic	1–1	Huddersfield Town	Charlton
15:00	Pritchard (yellow card) 41'; Hulse 60'		Dixon (yellow card) 25'; Southern (red card) 35'; Clayton (yellow card) 80' (goal) 88' (pen.)	Stadium: The Valley; Attendance: 20,012; Referee: Lee Collins

27 November 2012 19	Middlesbrough	3–0	Huddersfield Town	Middlesbrough
19:45	McDonald 28', 85'; Ledesma 66'; Hoyte (yellow card) 80'			Stadium: Riverside Stadium; Attendance: 21,850; Referee: Scott Mathieson

1 December 2012 20	Huddersfield Town	2–4	Leeds United	Huddersfield
12:30	Atkinson 12'; Clayton 43' (pen.); Ward (yellow card) 71'		Tonge 35'; Becchio 37', 86' (yellow card) 42'; Norris 70'	Stadium: John Smith's Stadium; Attendance: 20,372; Referee: Mike Dean

8 December 2012 21	Huddersfield Town	2–2	Bolton Wanderers	Huddersfield
15:00	Knight 9' (o.g.); Gerrard (yellow card) 48'; Novak (yellow card) 62'; Vaughan (yellow card) 64' (goal) 87'; Dixon (yellow card) 74'; Clayton (yellow card) 90+7'		Bogdán (yellow card) 42'; M. Davies 70'; Eagles 80'	Stadium: John Smith's Stadium; Attendance: 16,372; Referee: Eddie Ilderton

15 December 2012 22	Hull City	2–0	Huddersfield Town	Kingston upon Hull
12:30	Koren 8'; Quinn (yellow card) 31'; Meyler (yellow card) 52' (goal) 90+4'		Southern (yellow card) 33'	Stadium: KC Stadium; Attendance: 16,488; Referee: Howard Webb

22 December 2012 23	Crystal Palace	1–1	Huddersfield Town	Selhurst
17:20	Delaney (red card) 11'; Zaha 39'		Woods (yellow card) 2'; Lynch (yellow card) 52'; Southern 75'; Gerrard (red card) 80'; Hunt (yellow card) 87'	Stadium: Selhurst Park; Attendance: 17,993; Referee: Graham Scott

26 December 2012 24	Huddersfield Town	1–1	Blackpool	Huddersfield
15:00	Gerrard 66'		Osbourne (yellow card) 63'; Baptiste (yellow card) 65'; Delfouneso 90+3'	Stadium: John Smith's Stadium; Attendance: 16,832; Referee: Nigel Miller

29 December 2012 25	Huddersfield Town	0–0	Sheffield Wednesday	Huddersfield
12:30	Hunt (yellow card) 22'; Hammill (yellow card) 30'; Dixon (yellow card) 79'		Antonio (yellow card) 9'; Hélan (yellow card) 24'; Johnson (yellow card) 45+1'	Stadium: John Smith's Stadium; Attendance: 17,694; Referee: Mick Russell

1 January 2013 26	Leicester City	6–1	Huddersfield Town	Leicester
15:00	Wood 6', 24'; De Laet 45+1'; Knockaert 49', 51'; Waghorn 76'		Lynch (yellow card) 43'; Arfield 60'	Stadium: King Power Stadium; Attendance: 25,913; Referee: Mark Heywood

12 January 2013 27	Huddersfield Town	1–1	Birmingham City	Huddersfield
15:00	Lee (yellow card) 73'; Gerrard (yellow card) 86'; Hammill 90+3' (yellow card) 90+4'		Reilly 45+1'; Burke (yellow card) 45+2'; Davies (yellow card) 79'; Spector (yellow card) 86'; Robinson (yellow card) 88'	Stadium: John Smith's Stadium; Attendance: 14,214; Referee: Graham Salisbury

19 January 2013 28	Watford	4–0	Huddersfield Town	Watford
15:00	Cassetti (yellow card) 45+1'; Deeney 45+8' (pen.); Vydra 57', 74'; Battocchio 86'		Vaughan (yellow card) 41'; Woods (yellow card) 45+7'	Stadium: Vicarage Road; Attendance: 12,522; Referee: Scott Duncan

30 January 2013 29	Huddersfield Town	1–0	Crystal Palace	Huddersfield
19:45	Norwood (yellow card) 24'; Vaughan (yellow card) 54' (goal) 65'		Delaney (yellow card) 79'	Stadium: John Smith's Stadium; Attendance: 13,471; Referee: Carl Boyeson

2 February 2013 30	Derby County	3–0	Huddersfield Town	Derby
15:00	Bryson 24'; Ward 33'; Keogh 59'; Brayford (yellow card) 61'; O'Brien (yellow card) 90+1'		Woods (yellow card) 58'	Stadium: Pride Park Stadium; Attendance: 21,561; Referee: Keith Stroud

9 February 2013 31	Huddersfield Town	0–0	Cardiff City	Huddersfield
15:00	Lynch (yellow card) 45+2'; Hunt (yellow card) 88'		Taylor (yellow card) 25'; Nugent (yellow card) 57'; Bellamy (yellow card) 89'	Stadium: John Smith's Stadium; Attendance: 15,265; Referee: Mark Brown

19 February 2013 32	Nottingham Forest	6–1	Huddersfield Town	Nottingham
19:45	Majewski 21', 37', 43'; Ward 24'; Lansbury 55'; Henderson 90+3'		Vaughan 10'; Lynch (yellow card) 39'; Clayton (yellow card) 69'	Stadium: City Ground; Attendance: 26,938; Referee: Paul Tierney

23 February 2013 33	Huddersfield Town	0–0	Ipswich Town	Huddersfield
15:00	Vaughan (yellow card) 62'			Stadium: John Smith's Stadium; Attendance: 13,083; Referee: Mike Dean

26 February 2013 34	Burnley	0–1	Huddersfield Town	Burnley
19:45	Stock (yellow card) 45+1'; Austin (yellow card) 61'; Trippier (yellow card) 75'		Gerrard (yellow card) 3'; Vaughan 55'; Clayton (yellow card) 79'; Arfield (yellow card) 90+5'	Stadium: Turf Moor; Attendance: 11,266; Referee: Mark Halsey

2 March 2013 35	Brighton & Hove Albion	4–1	Huddersfield Town	Brighton
15:00	Ulloa 20', 76', 78'; López 81' (pen.)		Danns (yellow card) 33'; Gerrard (yellow card) 40'; Vaughan 42' (yellow card) 67'; Dixon (yellow card) 49'	Stadium: Falmer Stadium; Attendance: 25,831; Referee: Gavin Ward

5 March 2013 36	Huddersfield Town	2–1	Middlesbrough	Huddersfield
19:45	Lee 86'; Ward 90+2'		Smallwood (yellow card) 43'; McDonald 78'; Ledesma (yellow card) 90+4'	Stadium: John Smith's Stadium; Attendance: 12,705; Referee: Stuart Attwell

9 March 2013 37	Huddersfield Town	0–1	Charlton Athletic	Huddersfield
15:00	Lee (yellow card) 88'; Danns (yellow card) 90+5'		Harriott 4' (yellow card) 18'; Taylor (yellow card) 48'; Wiggins (yellow card) 77'	Stadium: John Smith's Stadium; Attendance: 13,591; Referee: Keith Stroud

16 March 2013 38	Leeds United	1–2	Huddersfield Town	Leeds
12:30	Habibou (yellow card) 6'; Varney (yellow card) 26'; Austin (yellow card) 35'; White 60'		Dixon (yellow card) 12'; Danns 54'; Vaughan 86'	Stadium: Elland Road; Attendance: 23,814; Referee: Andre Marriner

30 March 2013 39	Huddersfield Town	0–1	Hull City	Huddersfield
17:20	Danns (yellow card) 48'; Clayton (yellow card) 64'; Gobern (yellow card) 80'; Vaughan (yellow card) 86'		Elmohamady (yellow card) 39'; Meyler (yellow card) 41'; Boyd 46'; Evans (yellow card) 86'; Hobbs (yellow card) 89'	Stadium: John Smith's Stadium; Attendance: 11,997; Referee: Darren Deadman

2 April 2013 40	Bolton Wanderers	1–0	Huddersfield Town	Bolton
20:00	Eagles 58'		Danns (yellow card) 60'; Woods (yellow card) 81'; Gobern (yellow card) 90+5'	Stadium: Reebok Stadium; Attendance: 16,500; Referee: David Webb

6 April 2013 41	Huddersfield Town	2–2	Peterborough United	Huddersfield
15:00	Danns 41'; Dixon (yellow card) 45+1'; Woods (yellow card) 56'; Beckford (yellow card) 62'; Wallace 69'; Vaughan (yellow card) 78'; P. Clarke (yellow card) 84'		Tomlin 50'; Knight-Percival (yellow card) 66'; Gayle 86'	Stadium: John Smith's Stadium; Attendance: 14,175; Referee: Mark Heywood

13 April 2013 42	Wolverhampton Wanderers	1–3	Huddersfield Town	Wolverhampton
15:00	Ward 4' (yellow card) 59'; O'Hara (red card) 72'; Doherty (yellow card) 73'		Scannell 27'; Beckford 69', 70' (yellow card) 70'; Southern (yellow card) 72'; P. Clarke (yellow card) 73'	Stadium: Molineux Stadium; Attendance: 23,185; Referee: Keith Stroud

16 April 2013 43	Blackburn Rovers	1–0	Huddersfield Town	Blackburn
19:45	Rhodes 37'; Dann (yellow card) 52'		Woods (yellow card) 17'; Southern (yellow card) 35'; Dixon (yellow card) 68'; Beckford (yellow card) 87'	Stadium: Ewood Park; Attendance: 15,317; Referee: Darren Drysdale

20 April 2013 44	Huddersfield Town	3–0	Millwall	Huddersfield
12:30	Beckford 37', 62'; Vaughan 55'; Hunt (yellow card) 64'		Batt (yellow card) 47'; Smith (yellow card) 61'; Easter (yellow card) 69'	Stadium: John Smith's Stadium; Attendance: 12,415; Referee: Scott Mathieson

27 April 2013 45	Bristol City	1–3	Huddersfield Town	Bristol
15:00	Nyatanga 90'	Report	Vaughan 2', 13', 64'	Stadium: Ashton Gate Stadium; Attendance: 13,376; Referee: Paul Tierney

4 May 2013 46	Huddersfield Town	2–2	Barnsley	Huddersfield
12:45	Beckford 53'; Southern (yellow card) 61'; Vaughan 81'; P. Clarke (yellow card) 83'; Novak (yellow card) 86'		O'Grady 14' (yellow card) 90+1'; Mellis (yellow card) 49'; Noble-Lazarus (yellow card) 73'; Scotland 74'	Stadium: John Smith's Stadium; Attendance: 21,614; Referee: Andre Marriner

=== FA Cup ===
5 January 2013 Third round	Charlton Athletic	0–1	Huddersfield Town	Charlton
15:00	Dervite (red card) 57'; Pritchard (yellow card) 72'		Beckford 11'; Arfield (yellow card) 20'; Vaughan (yellow card) 43'; Clayton (yellow card) 71'; Hunt (yellow card) 85'	Stadium: The Valley; Attendance: 6,657; Referee: Darren Drysdale

26 January 2013 Fourth round	Huddersfield Town	1–1	Leicester City	Huddersfield
15:00	Norwood (yellow card) 50'; Novak (yellow card) 70' (goal) 74' (pen.); Clayton (yellow card) 84'		Keane (yellow card) 35'; Wood 82'; Marshall (yellow card) 88'	Stadium: John Smith's Stadium; Attendance: 11,945; Referee: Anthony Taylor

12 February 2013 Fourth round replay	Leicester City	1–2	Huddersfield Town	Leicester
19:30	Keane 7'; Gallagher (yellow card) 81'; Knockaert (yellow card) 88'		Clayton 5'; Gerrard (yellow card) 73'; Scannell 75'	Stadium: King Power Stadium; Attendance: 14,517; Referee: James Adcock

17 February 2013 Fifth round	Huddersfield Town	1–4	Wigan Athletic	Huddersfield
15:55	Vaughan (yellow card) 59'; Novak 62'		McManaman 31' (yellow card) 83'; Koné 40', 89'; McArthur 56'	Stadium: John Smith's Stadium; Attendance: 12,117; Referee: Michael Oliver

=== Football League Cup ===
13 August 2012 First round	Preston North End	2–0	Huddersfield Town	Preston
19:45	Wroe (yellow card) 15' (goal) 40'; King 29'; Beardsley (yellow card) 87'		P. Clarke (yellow card) 17'	Stadium: Deepdale; Attendance: 5,750; Referee: Robert Lewis
