= Liam Ridehalgh =

English footballer

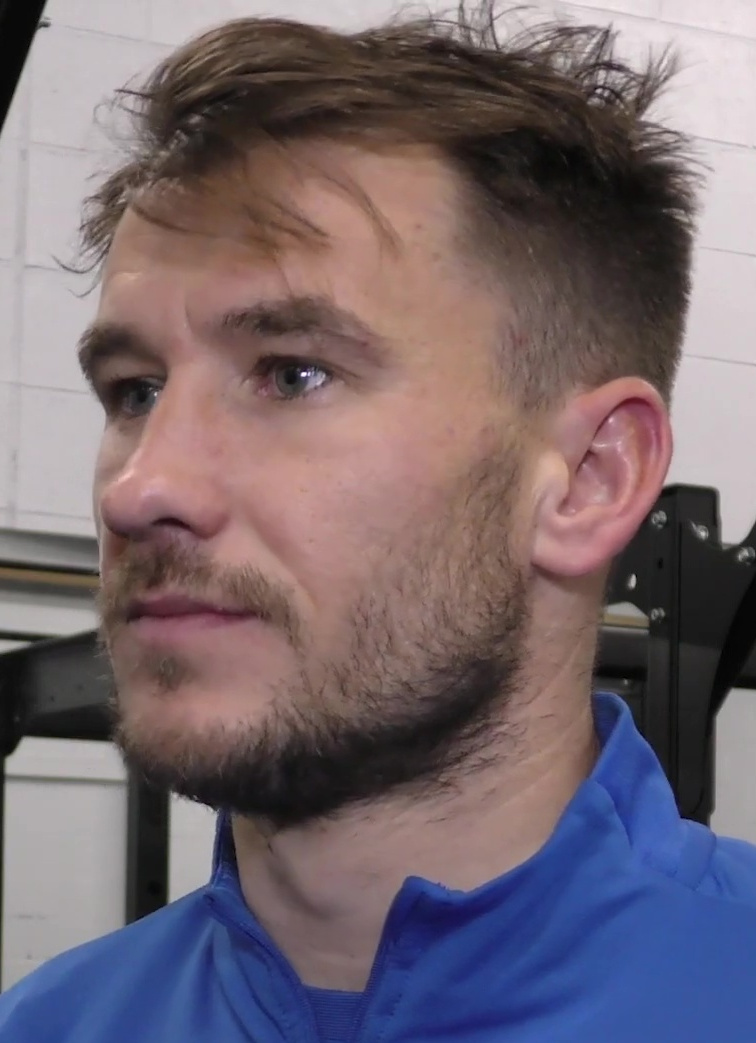

Personal information
- Full name: Liam Mark Ridehalgh
- Date of birth: 20 April 1991 (age 35)
- Place of birth: Halifax, England
- Height: 5 ft 10 in (1.78 m)
- Position: Defender

Team information
- Current team: Guiseley

Youth career
- 2003–2010: Huddersfield Town

Senior career*
| Years | Team | Apps | (Gls) |
| 2010–2014 | Huddersfield Town | 20 | (0) |
| 2011 | → Swindon Town (loan) | 11 | (0) |
| 2012 | → Chesterfield (loan) | 20 | (1) |
| 2012 | → Chesterfield (loan) | 14 | (0) |
| 2012–2013 | → Rotherham United (loan) | 20 | (0) |
| 2013 | → Tranmere Rovers (loan) | 36 | (1) |
| 2014–2021 | Tranmere Rovers | 225 | (4) |
| 2021–2024 | Bradford City | 85 | (1) |
| 2024– | Guiseley | 25 | (0) |

Managerial career
- 2025: Guiseley (caretaker)
- * Club domestic league appearances and goals as of 12:12, 21 April 2025 (UTC)

Liam Mark Ridehalgh (born 20 April 1991) is an English professional footballer who plays as a defender for Northern Premier League Premier Division club Guiseley.

== Career ==
=== Huddersfield Town ===
Ridehalgh joined the Huddersfield Town Academy at under-12 level and joined the club's academy in his first year in 2007. Despite not being in the first team squad, Ridehalgh was given the number thirty shirt. Ridehalgh went on to progress through the club's youth system signing his first professional deal with the club at the end of the 2008–09 season after finishing the academy he signed a one-year contract extension at the end of the 2009–10 season.

He made his debut for the Terriers in the 3–1 win over Charlton Athletic at the Galpharm Stadium on 28 August 2010, due to an injury to first choice left back Gary Naysmith and in which, he made his first start. As a result of Naysmith's injury, Manager Lee Clarke decided not to loan out Ridehalgh, citing left-back crisis. After having played few games so far, Club captain Peter Clarke was impressed with Ridehalgh performance during the season, describing him as "best debut he's [Clarke] ever seen from a teenager." Following his recovery from glandular fever, resulting in Ridehalgh losing weight he started rehabilitation. Ridehalgh suffered a foot injury during a match against Tranmere Rovers that resulted him to miss out for the rest of the season. Ridehalgh then became a regular in the first team until Naysmith returned from a foot injury in February 2011 making a total of 20 league appearances with a further three coming in the FA Cup. On 20 April 2011, Ridehalgh would sign a two-year contract, keeping him until 2013.

At the end of the 2012–13 season, Ridehalgh was offered a new contract by the club.

=== Loan spells ===
After making recovery in Huddersfield Town's pre-season friendly, it announced on 28 September 2011, he joined Football League Two side Swindon Town on a month's loan, after being isolated by the form of Gary Naysmith and Calum Woods. Upon joining Swindon Town, Ridehalgh expected to have playing time at Swindon Town. Ridehalgh made his league debut for the club, where he came on for Raffaele De Vita in the 75th minute, in a 2–0 win over Macclesfield Town on 30 September 2011. As a result of gaining first team experience at Swindon Town, Ridehalgh's loan was extended a month later, and Ridehalgh eventually returned to Huddersfield on 28 December 2011, having made 13 appearances for Swindon, leaving them in the play-off places. Prior to the recalled by Huddersfield Town, Ridehalgh loan spell with Swindon Town was about to be extended further until the end of the season.

He then went on loan to League One strugglers Chesterfield on a deal that would last to the end of the 2011–12 season, playing his first game in the 0–2 home defeat at the hands of Exeter City on 7 January 2012. He scored his first ever career league goal on 27 January in a 1–0 win against Bournemouth. Ridehalgh made an impressive display for Chesterfield despite being relegated and made twenty appearances and scoring once. However, he was unavailable to play in the final of the Football League Trophy, having played for Swindon (Chesterfield's opponent in the final) in the same competition earlier in the season. He returned to the club for a second loan spell on 24 August 2012 for one month. Ridehalgh's first game after signing for the club on his second loan spell came on 25 August 2012, where he came on as a substitute for Danny Whitaker in the 78th minute, in a 1–1 draw against Rotherham United. Having made seven appearances in his second spell, Ridehalgh loan spell with Huddersfield Town was extended by two months.

On 22 November 2012, just as the loan window was shut, Ridehalgh's parent club, Huddersfield Town, recalled him from his loan spell at Chesterfield and sent him on loan to their divisional rivals, Rotherham United. It was revealed that the club allowed to end Ridehalgh early after losing his first team place to Nathan Smith under the management of Paul Cook. Ridehalgh made his league debut for the club two days later, in a 1–0 win over Exeter City. Ridehalgh quickly made an impact and after seven appearances, Ridehalgh's loan spell with Rotherham United was extended until the end of the season. Towards the end of the season, Ridehalgh suffered an injury and only prefer on the bench, though he made one appearance since returning from injury, coming on as a substitute, in a 1–0 win over Plymouth Argyle. Nevertheless, Ridehalgh made 20 appearances and helped the club get promoted to League One.

=== Tranmere Rovers ===
On 28 September 2013, Ridehalgh joined Tranmere Rovers on a 3-month loan, and made his début against Port Vale on the same day. Unfortunately, he was sent off within 30 minutes of his début, and Tranmere eventually lost 1–0 at Prenton Park. He made 15 appearances for the Rovers, and scored one goal against Bristol City on 16 November 2013. Having made seventeen appearances, Ridehalgh's loan spell with Tranmere Rovers came to an end.

Liam re-joined Tranmere Rovers on 1 January 2014 so he could be available for the New Year's Day game versus Wolverhampton Wanderers and so permanently on 3 January 2014. Weeks after joining the club permanently, Ridehalgh sustained a groin injury during a 3–0 loss to Peterborough United and was taken off half-time. Following this, Ridehalgh was out for weeks. He made his return to training on 30 January 2014 and started in a 1–0 win over MK Dons on 1 February 2014. However, Ridehalgh was unable to help the club survive relegation in League One and resulted playing in League Two and Ridehalgh made thirty-eight appearances in all competitions.

Ahead of the 2014–15 season, Ridehalgh determined to have a good season with the club. Ridehalgh also was given the number three shirt ahead of the new season. However, Ridehalgh sustained an ankle injury in a pre-season friendly match that kept him out for six weeks. After three months out, Ridehalgh made a recovery and made his first appearance of the season, coming on as a substitute, in a 2–2 draw against Wimbledon. Ridehalgh ended the season with only 18 appearances as Tranmere suffered back-to-back relegations falling to National League.

Ridehalgh remained at Tranmere and began 2015–16 season as a regular starter, scoring an opening goal as Rovers won at Gateshead.

After three years in non-league, Ridehalgh and Tranmere were promoted to the EFL after a 2–1 win against Boreham Wood in 2018. Tranmere played 89 minutes with 10 men, after Ridehalgh was dismissed for a dangerous tackle in the first minute.

Ridehalgh was named as Tranmeres Player's Player of the Season in their 2019–20 'Not End of Season' Awards

=== Bradford City ===
On 23 June 2021, Ridehalgh agreed to join Bradford City on a two-year deal following the expiration of his contract with Tranmere.

He was released by Bradford City at the end of the 2023–24 season.

=== Guiseley ===
On 16 September 2024, Ridehalgh joined Northern Premier League Premier Division club Guiseley.

On 12 October 2025, Ridehalgh was appointed caretaker manager of the club following the sacking of Mark Bower.

== Career statistics ==
As of match played 5 April 2025

Appearances and goals by club, season and competition
| Club | Season | League | | | FA Cup | | League Cup | | Other | | Total | |
| Club | Season | Division | Apps | Goals | Apps | Goals | Apps | Goals | Apps | Goals | Apps | Goals |
|---|---|---|---|---|---|---|---|---|---|---|---|---|
| Huddersfield Town | 2010–11 | League One | 20 | 0 | 3 | 0 | 0 | 0 | 3 (Note: Appearances in EFL Trophy) | 0 | 26 | 0 |
| Huddersfield Town | 2011–12 | League One | 0 | 0 | 0 | 0 | 0 | 0 | 0 | 0 | 0 | 0 |
| Huddersfield Town | 2012–13 | Championship | 0 | 0 | 0 | 0 | 0 | 0 | 0 | 0 | 0 | 0 |
| Huddersfield Town | Total | | 20 | 0 | 3 | 0 | 0 | 0 | 3 | 0 | 26 | 0 |
| Swindon Town (loan) | 2011–12 | League Two | 11 | 0 | 1 | 0 | 0 | 0 | 1 | 0 | 13 | 0 |
| Chesterfield (loans) | 2011–12 | League One | 20 | 1 | 0 | 0 | 0 | 0 | 0 | 0 | 20 | 1 |
| Chesterfield (loans) | 2012–13 | League Two | 14 | 0 | 0 | 0 | 0 | 0 | 2 | 0 | 16 | 0 |
| Rotherham United (loan) | 2012–13 | League Two | 20 | 0 | 0 | 0 | 0 | 0 | 0 | 0 | 20 | 0 |
| Tranmere Rovers | 2013–14 | League One | 36 | 1 | 2 | 0 | 0 | 0 | 0 | 0 | 38 | 1 |
| Tranmere Rovers | 2014–15 | League Two | 18 | 0 | 3 | 0 | 0 | 0 | 2 | 0 | 23 | 0 |
| Tranmere Rovers | 2015–16 | National League | 26 | 1 | 2 | 0 | — | | 1 (Note: Appearance(s) in FA Trophy) | 0 | 29 | 1 |
| Tranmere Rovers | 2016–17 | National League | 39 | 1 | 1 | 0 | — | | 8 (Note: 5 appearances in FA Trophy, 3 appearances in National League play-offs) | 0 | 48 | 1 |
| Tranmere Rovers | 2017–18 | National League | 37 | 0 | 3 | 0 | — | | 2 (Note: Appearances in National League play-offs) | 0 | 42 | 0 |
| Tranmere Rovers | 2018–19 | League Two | 18 | 0 | 4 | 0 | 0 | 0 | 3 (Note: Appearances in EFL League Two play-offs) | 0 | 25 | 0 |
| Tranmere Rovers | 2019–20 | League One | 29 | 1 | 4 | 0 | 1 | 0 | 2 | 0 | 36 | 1 |
| Tranmere Rovers | 2020–21 | League Two | 22 | 0 | 3 | 0 | 0 | 0 | 6 | 0 | 31 | 0 |
| Tranmere Rovers | Total | | 225 | 4 | 22 | 0 | 1 | 0 | 24 | 0 | 272 | 4 |
| Bradford City | 2021–22 | League Two | 29 | 0 | 1 | 0 | 1 | 0 | 1 | 0 | 32 | 0 |
| Bradford City | 2022–23 | League Two | 28 | 0 | 0 | 0 | 2 | 0 | 0 | 0 | 30 | 0 |
| Bradford City | 2023–24 | League Two | 28 | 1 | 1 | 0 | 3 | 0 | 3 | 0 | 35 | 1 |
| Bradford City | Total | | 85 | 1 | 2 | 0 | 6 | 0 | 4 | 0 | 97 | 1 |
| Guiseley | 2024–25 | Northern Premier League Premier Division | 25 | 0 | 3 | 0 | – | | 1 | 0 | 29 | 0 |
| Career totals | | | 420 | 6 | 31 | 0 | 7 | 0 | 35 | 0 | 493 | 6 |

== Honours ==
Tranmere Rovers

- EFL League Two play-offs: 2019
- National League play-offs: 2018
- EFL Trophy runner-up: 2020–21
