= Sean Scannell =

Footballer (born 1990)

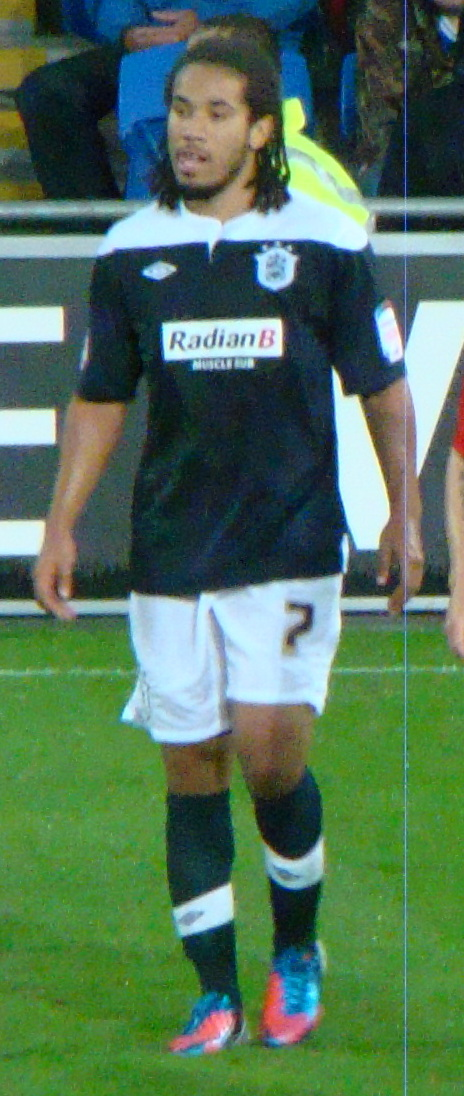
- Scannell playing for Huddersfield Town in 2012

Personal information
- Full name: Sean Scannell
- Date of birth: 17 September 1990 (age 36)
- Place of birth: Croydon, England
- Height: 5 ft 9 in (1.75 m)
- Position: Winger

Team information
- Current team: Cray Valley Paper Mills

Youth career
- 1999–2002: Addiscombe Corinthians
- 2003–2007: Crystal Palace

Senior career*
Years	Team	Apps	(Gls)
2007–2012	Crystal Palace	130	(12)
2012–2018	Huddersfield Town	158	(8)
2017–2018	→ Burton Albion (loan)	18	(0)
2018–2019	Bradford City	21	(1)
2019–2020	Blackpool	8	(1)
2020–2023	Grimsby Town	25	(1)
2023–2026	Hornchurch	83	(8)
2026	Glacis United	1	(0)
2026–	Cray Valley Paper Mills	0	(0)

International career
2006–2007	Republic of Ireland U17	10	(3)
2007	Republic of Ireland U18	2	(0)
2009	Republic of Ireland U19	3	(1)
2008–2012	Republic of Ireland U21	10	(0)
2008	Republic of Ireland B	1	(0)
- * Club domestic league appearances and goals as of 17:36, 4 March 2026 (UTC)

Sean Scannell (born 17 September 1990) is a former professional footballer who last played as a winger for Isthmian League South East Division club Cray Valley Paper Mills.

Scannell began his career with Crystal Palace where he scored 12 goals in 130 League appearances between 2007 and 2012. He then signed for Huddersfield Town where he spent the next six seasons. He has since played for Burton Albion, Bradford City, Blackpool and Grimsby Town. He has represented the Republic of Ireland at U17, U18, U19, U21 and B level.

== Club career ==
=== Crystal Palace ===
Scannell joined Palace at 14 and notched 23 goals for the academy during the 2006–07 season, graduating to the reserves before breaking into the first team in the 2007–08 season. Scannell made his debut for Crystal Palace in a 2–1 win at London rivals QPR in December 2007 as a substitute. In his home debut against Sheffield Wednesday on 15 December, he again came on as a substitute in the second half and scored a 90th-minute winner, his first senior goal in a 2–1 victory for Crystal Palace. He finished that campaign having featured in 25 games, earning him a call up to the Republic of Ireland Under-17's squad and was named Palace's Young Player of the Year in 2008.

Following this, Scannell was offered a two-and-a-half-year professional contract with Palace. Scannell signed the contract at the beginning of the new year, and celebrated by scoring Palace's second goal in a 3–0 victory against Wolverhampton Wanderers the following weekend.

At the end of the 2008–09 season, and still only 18 years old, Scannell was voted Championship Apprentice of the Year. He made steady progress over the following two campaigns scoring twice in each season, however he missed the first half of the 2010–11 campaign because of a knee injury, that restricted him to 19 outings in that season.

The 2011–12 season was Scannell's best season for the Eagles, with 37 league appearances, four goals and three assists. His form early in the season earned him a new four-and-a-half-year contract in September 2011.

=== Huddersfield Town ===
It was reported on 22 June 2012 that newly promoted Huddersfield Town were poised to make Scannell the club's first signing of 2012 since winning promotion to the Championship via the League One play-offs. The reports stated that Scannell who was linked with the Terriers in January 2012, had agreed a three-year deal for an undisclosed fee and would move subject to a medical. Later that day, Scannell signed a three-year contract with Huddersfield, making him Simon Grayson's first permanent signing for the club. He made his league debut in the 1–0 defeat by Cardiff City at the Cardiff City Stadium on 17 August. On 3 November 2012, he scored his first goal for the club in a 1–0 victory versus Bristol City.

On 18 August 2017, Scannell joined Championship club Burton Albion on loan for the 2017–2018 season. The loan was cut short on 11 January 2018 due to an injury.

=== Bradford City ===
On 19 July 2018, Scannell signed for League One club Bradford City on an initial two-year deal for an undisclosed fee.

=== Blackpool ===
After one year at Valley Parade, Scannell joined Blackpool on a free transfer. He was released in June 2020.

=== Grimsby Town ===
On 2 September 2020, Scannell signed a two-year deal for League Two club Grimsby Town. Scannell's debut season with Grimsby was hit by a string of injuries for Ian Holloway's side, this limited him to 13 appearances in all competitions without scoring.

Scannell scored his first goal for Grimsby in a 2–0 away victory over Yeovil Town on 10 March 2022, Mariners boss Paul Hurst commented that Scannell had been on the edges of the first team all season but due to injury and not being selected he had found it hard to include him, but equally praising his effort in training and for taking his opportunity.

He went on to feature as a regular in the Grimsby team before rupturing his Achilles in a game against Maidenhead United. Grimsby secured promotion with victory in the play-off final, though Scannell was not in the matchday squad at London Stadium.

On 8 July 2022, Paul Hurst announced Scannell had extended his contract by signing a new short-term deal, confirming the club would continue to support him as he continue his lengthy rehab following his injury. On 5 January 2023, Hurst announced that Scannell had extended his contract until the end of the 2022–23 season, having recovered and returned from his latest injury.

On 9 May 2023, it was announced that Scannell would not be retained for the 2023–24 season and would be leaving the club when his contract expires on 30 June.

=== Hornchurch ===
On 12 July 2023, Scannell signed for Isthmian League Premier Division club Hornchurch. The season ended in success as Hornchurch were promoted to the National League South as champions. After nearly 100 appearances for the club in all competitions, he left the club in January 2026 to pursue an opportunity outside of football. However, several days later, Scannell was announced as a new signing for Gibraltar Football League side Glacis United.

=== Cray Valley Paper Mills ===
In March 2026, Scannell returned to England, joining Isthmian League Premier Division club Cray Valley Paper Mills.

== International career ==
=== Republic of Ireland ===
As Scannell was born in England and is of Irish and Jamaican heritage, he is eligible to play international football for four national teams. His father being from County Armagh allows him the choice between Northern Ireland or the Republic. He has represented the Republic of Ireland at Under-17, Under-18, Under-19, Under-21 and Ireland B levels.

Scannell made his under-21 debut in a 1–1 draw with Montenegro in March 2008 at Terryland Park in Galway. In 2007, he was awarded the Young Player of the Year award by the Football Association of Ireland. Scannell was named man of the match in the under-21s' 1–1 draw with Germany on 10 February 2009 at Turners Cross in Cork. He made 10 appearances for the under-21s between 2009 and 2012. On 30 July 2012, Scannell received his first call up to the under-21 squad since joining Huddersfield Town, for the European Championship qualifier against Turkey. He would play the final 10 minutes for the Irish in his 10th appearance.

His good form with Palace led to him being recognised for the Republic of Ireland senior team by coach Giovanni Trapattoni, who called Scannell into his 28-man squad for friendlies against Serbia and Colombia in 2008.

=== Northern Ireland ===
In May 2018, it was reported that Scannell had submitted the required paperwork to FIFA to declare for Northern Ireland and would be involved in the squad's upcoming Nations League campaign.

== Personal life ==
Born in Croydon, London, Scannell is the brother of Tonbridge Angels player Damian Scannell and as a youngster growing up played for Addiscombe Corinthians and Afewee Academy.

Scannell's father is from County Armagh, and he is also of Jamaican heritage.

== Career statistics ==
As of end of 2023–24 season

Appearances and goals by club, season and competition
Club	Season	League			FA Cup		League Cup		Other		Total	
Club	Season	Division	Apps	Goals	Apps	Goals	Apps	Goals	Apps	Goals	Apps	Goals
Crystal Palace	2007–08	Championship	23	2	1	0	0	0	1 (Note: Appearance in Championship play-offs)	0	25	2
Crystal Palace	2008–09	Championship	25	2	1	1	1	0	—		27	3
Crystal Palace	2009–10	Championship	26	2	1	0	2	0	—		29	2
Crystal Palace	2010–11	Championship	19	2	0	0	0	0	—		19	2
Crystal Palace	2011–12	Championship	37	4	0	0	4	0	—		41	4
Crystal Palace	Total		130	12	3	1	7	0	1	0	141	13
Huddersfield Town	2012–13	Championship	34	2	4	1	0	0	—		38	3
Huddersfield Town	2013–14	Championship	38	1	2	0	2	0	—		42	1
Huddersfield Town	2014–15	Championship	42	4	1	0	2	0	—		45	4
Huddersfield Town	2015–16	Championship	29	1	1	0	0	0	—		30	1
Huddersfield Town	2016–17	Championship	15	0	0	0	1	0	0	0	16	0
Huddersfield Town	2017–18	Premier League	0	0	1	0	—		—		1	0
Huddersfield Town	Total		158	8	9	1	5	0	0	0	172	9
Burton Albion (loan)	2017–18	Championship	18	0	0	0	1	0	—		19	0
Bradford City	2018–19	League One	16	0	0	0	1	0	1 (Note: Appearance(s) in EFL Trophy)	0	18	0
Bradford City	2019–20	League Two	5	1	0	0	1	0	0	0	7	1
Bradford City	Total		39	1	0	0	3	0	1	0	44	1
Blackpool	2019–20	League One	8	1	0	0	0	0	4	0	12	1
Grimsby Town	2020–21	League Two	11	0	1	0	1	0	2	0	15	0
Grimsby Town	2021–22	National League	12	1	0	0	0	0	0	0	12	1
Grimsby Town	2022–23	League Two	2	0	0	0	0	0	0	0	2	0
Grimsby Town	Total		25	2	1	0	1	0	2	0	29	2
Hornchurch	2023–24	Isthmian League Premier Division	38	6	2	1	–		0	0	40	7
Career total			398	29	15	3	16	0	8	0	438	32

== Honours ==
Huddersfield Town

- EFL Championship play-offs: 2017

Hornchurch

- Isthmian League Premier Division: 2023–24
