= Anton Robinson =

English footballer (born 1986)

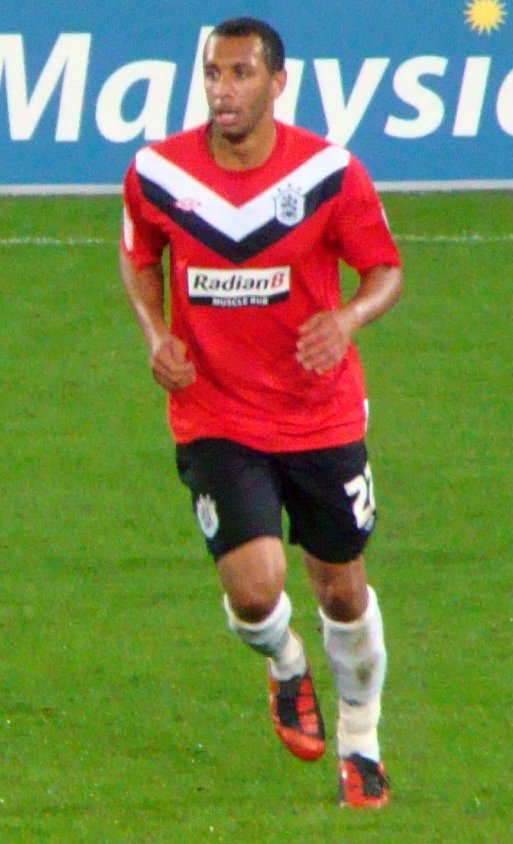

Personal information
- Full name: Anton Dale Robinson
- Date of birth: 17 February 1986 (age 40)
- Place of birth: Harrow, England
- Position: Midfielder

Youth career
- 1996–2004: Millwall

Senior career*
Years	Team	Apps	(Gls)
2004–2005	Millwall	0	(0)
2005	Eastleigh	4	(1)
2005	Margate	2	(0)
2005–2006	Exeter City	0	(0)
2006	Eastbourne Borough	11	(0)
2006–2007	Fisher Athletic	18	(4)
2007	Grays Athletic	0	(0)
2007–2009	Weymouth	84	(6)
2009–2011	Bournemouth	106	(10)
2011–2014	Huddersfield Town	27	(1)
2013	→ Gillingham (loan)	14	(0)
2014	→ Coventry City (loan)	6	(0)
Total		272	(22)

International career
2008	England C	2	(0)
- * Club domestic league appearances and goals

Anton Dale Robinson (born 17 February 1986 in Harrow, London) is an English retired professional footballer who played as a central midfielder, for a number of clubs, most notably AFC Bournemouth and Huddersfield Town, before retiring from professional football due to a serious knee injury.

== Club career ==
=== Early career ===
Robinson started his career with Millwall, and was captain of the youth team. He featured for Millwall in the League Championship and the FA Cup. Robinson was also part of the Millwall squad that reached the FA Cup final in 2004.

In 2006, he moved to Exeter City but was not offered the opportunity to showcase his talent. He then signed a contract for Fisher Athletic in 2006 and made 18 appearances, scoring six goals. In 2007, Robinson then signed with Weymouth, eventually becoming the captain. He made 85 appearances and scored 10 goals.

=== Bournemouth ===
After a string of fine displays for Weymouth, Robinson signed for Football League club AFC Bournemouth in January 2009. He scored his first goal for Bournemouth in a match against Chester City away on 18 April 2009. Bournemouth won the match 2–0.

=== Huddersfield Town ===
After a previous offer had been turned down, Huddersfield Town signed Robinson on a three-year contract on 1 August 2011, paying an undisclosed transfer fee. He made his Terriers debut in the 1–1 draw against Bury at the Galpharm Stadium on 6 August 2011, but suffered a hamstring injury during the first half. His first goal for the club was the only goal in a 1–0 win against Yeovil Town at Huish Park on 29 October 2011. Robinson made a total of 30 first team appearances for Huddersfield in his first season at the club, making 12 starts among 26 league appearances as Huddersfield won promotion through the play-offs.

The following season, he made just one league appearance for Huddersfield, in a 3–0 defeat against Middlesbrough in November, before joining League Two leaders Gillingham on loan from 31 January 2013 for the remainder of the season. He played 14 games for the club, but his loan was cut short on 11 April, after he ruptured his anterior cruciate ligaments, ruling him out of action for nine months.

On 24 March 2014, Robinson joined League One side Coventry City for the remainder of the 2013–14 season. He was released by Huddersfield when his loan expired in May 2014.

== International career ==
Robinson has represented his country at international level, having represented England on two occasions at semi-pro level with the England C team. Robinson's impressive performances as Weymouth captain earned him a call-up to the England squad for their friendly away at Bosnia & Herzegovina B in September 2008, where the match ended in a 6–2. He was then named on the team to face the Italy Lega Pro side in an International Challenge Trophy game. The match ended in a draw, with the score line at 2–2 in November 2008.

== Career statistics ==
As of 5 May 2014

Club	Season	League			FA Cup		League Cup		Other^{[A]}		Total	
Club	Season	Division	Apps	Goals	Apps	Goals	Apps	Goals	Apps	Goals	Apps	Goals
Millwall	2003–04	First Division	0	0	0	0	0	0	0	0	0	0
Sheffield Wednesday	2004–05	League One	0	0	0	0	0	0	0	0	0	0
Eastleigh	2004–05	Isthmian League	4	1	0	0	0	0	0	0	4	1
Exeter City	2004–05	Conference	0	0	0	0	0	0	0	0	0	0
Eastbourne Borough	2005–06	Conference South	11	0	0	0	0	0	0	0	11	0
Fisher Athletic	2006–07	Conference South	18	4	0	0	0	0	0	0	18	4
Weymouth	2006–07	Conference	12	0	0	0	0	0	0	0	12	0
Weymouth	2007–08	Conference	43	5	2	0	0	0	3	0	48	5
Weymouth	2008–09	Conference	29	1	0	0	0	0	0	0	29	1
Weymouth	Total		84	6	2	0	0	0	3	0	89	6
Bournemouth	2008–09	League Two	17	1	0	0	0	0	0	0	17	1
Bournemouth	2009–10	League Two	44	4	2	0	1	0	2	0	49	4
Bournemouth	2010–11	League One	45	5	2	0	1	0	3	0	51	5
Bournemouth	Total		106	10	4	0	2	0	5	0	117	10
Huddersfield Town	2011–12	League One	25	1	1	0	1	0	3	0	30	1
Huddersfield Town	2012–13	Championship	2	0	0	0	0	0	0	0	2	0
Huddersfield Town	2013–14	Championship	0	0	0	0	0	0	0	0	0	0
Huddersfield Town	Total		27	1	1	0	1	0	3	0	32	1
Gillingham (loan)	2012–13	League Two	14	0	0	0	0	0	0	0	14	0
Coventry City (loan)	2013–14	League One	6	0	0	0	0	0	0	0	6	0
Total			27	1	1	0	1	0	3	0	32	1
Career total			270	22	7	0	3	0	11	0	291	22

== Honours ==
Bournemouth

- Football League Two second-place promotion: 2009–10

Gillingham

- Football League Two: 2012–13
