= 2012–13 Chesterfield F.C. season =

Chesterfield F.C.
2012–13 season
- Chairman: Dave Allen
- Manager: John Sheridan (until 28 August 2012); Paul Cook (from 25 October 2012)
- Stadium: Proact Stadium
- League Two: 8th
- FA Cup: Second round
- League Cup: First round
- Football League Trophy: Second round
- Top goalscorer: League: Marc Richards (12); All: Marc Richards (12)
- Highest home attendance: 7,322 vs York City (26 December 2012, Football League 2)
- Lowest home attendance: 2,384 vs Oldham Athletic (4 September 2012, Football League Trophy)
Home colours	Away colours

The 2012–13 season was the 146th season in Chesterfield's history. Along with League Two, the club also participated in the FA Cup, Football League Cup and Football League Trophy. The season covered the period from 1 July 2012 to 30 June 2013.

== Squad ==
As of 27 April 2013.

Note: Flags indicate national team as defined under FIFA eligibility rules; some limited exceptions apply. Players may hold more than one non-FIFA nationality.

No.	Pos.	Nation	Player
1	GK	ENG	Tommy Lee
3	DF	JAM	Nathan Smith
5	DF	ENG	Neal Trotman
6	DF	ENG	Sam Hird
7	MF	ENG	Alex Henshall (on loan from Manchester City)
8	MF	ENG	Sam Togwell
9	FW	ENG	Marc Richards
10	MF	ENG	Danny Whitaker
12	MF	ENG	Tendayi Darikwa
13	GK	ENG	Richard O'Donnell
14	FW	ENG	Jack Lester
15	MF	ENG	Craig Clay
17	DF	ENG	Richard Brindley
18	FW	ENG	Scott Boden

No.	Pos.	Nation	Player
19	FW	ENG	Jacob Hazel
20	MF	ENG	Jack Waddle
21	FW	CIV	Armand Gnanduillet
22	FW	ENG	Jonathan Wafula
23	MF	ENG	Mark Randall
24	GK	ENG	Cameron Mason
25	DF	ENG	Drew Talbot
26	GK	WAL	Mark Crossley (Player/Coach)
30	DF	ENG	Jack Broadhead
31	DF	SCO	Liam Cooper
33	DF	ENG	Conor Townsend (on loan from Hull City)
34	MF	IRL	Jay O'Shea
39	DF	ENG	Tim Whittaker
40	GK	ENG	Josh Barrington

== League table ==
Pos	Team	Pld	W	D	L	GF	GA	GD	Pts	Promotion, qualification or relegation
6	Northampton Town	46	21	10	15	64	55	+9	73	Qualification for League Two play-offs (Note: Four teams play for one spot and promotion to Football League One.)
7	Bradford City (O, P)	46	18	15	13	63	52	+11	69	Qualification for League Two play-offs
8	Chesterfield	46	18	13	15	60	45	+15	67	
9	Oxford United	46	19	8	19	59	60	−1	65	
10	Exeter City	46	18	10	18	63	62	+1	64	

Updated to match(es) played on 27 April 2013. Source: BBC Sport
Rules for classification: 1) Points; 2) Goal difference; 3) Number of goals scored
(O) Play-off winners; (P) Promoted

== Results ==
=== League Two ===
18 August 2012 1	AFC Wimbledon	1–0	Chesterfield	Kingsmeadow
15:00	Midson 35'			Attendance: 3780

21 August 2012 2	Chesterfield	1–1	Rochdale	Proact Stadium
19:45	Lester 90+4'		Tutte 49'	Attendance: 4595

25 August 2012 3	Chesterfield	1–1	Rotherham United	Proact Stadium
15:00	Bowery 4'		Odejayi 51'	Attendance: 7232

1 September 2012 4	Gillingham	1–1	Chesterfield	Priestfield Stadium
15:00	Westcarr 13'		Kedwell 21'	Attendance: 4380

8 September 2012 5	York City	2–2	Chesterfield	Bootham Crescent
15:00	Hird 36'; Westcarr 41'		Coulson 40'; Walker 90+5'	Attendance: 5119

15 September 2012 6	Chesterfield	3–1	Wycombe Wanderers	Proact Stadium
15:00	Atkinson 14'; Lester 20'; Hird 85'		Trotman 40' (O.G.)	Attendance: 5113

18 September 2012 7	Chesterfield	4–3	Accrington Stanley	Proact Stadium
19:45	Lester 8', 66'; Richards 11'; Forbes 84'		Boco 28', 76'; Murphy 58'	Attendance: 4359

22 September 2012 8	Northampton Town	0–0	Chesterfield	Sixfields Stadium
15:00				Attendance: 4709

29 September 2012 9	Chesterfield	1–1	Torquay United	Proact Stadium
15:00	Darikwa 48'		Howe 51'	Attendance: 5117

2 October 2012 10	Morecambe	2–0	Chesterfield	Globe Arena
19:45	McDonald 45+2'; Alessandra 52'			Attendance: 1285

6 October 2012 11	Aldershot Town	0–1	Chesterfield	Recreation Ground
15:00			Atkinson 75'	Attendance: 2006

13 October 2012 12	Chesterfield	1–2	Dagenham and Redbridge	Proact Stadium
15:00	Lester 55'		Williams 42', 57'	Attendance: 5082

20 October 2012 13	Exeter City	0–1	Chesterfield	St James Park
15:00			Atkinson 42'	Attendance: 3668

23 October 2012 14	Chesterfield	1–2	Fleetwood Town	Proact Stadium
19:45	Darikwa 44'		Gillespie 6'; Atkinson 90' (O.G.)	Attendance: 4372

27 October 2012 15	Chesterfield	0–1	Barnet	Proact Stadium
15:00			Byrne 89' (pen.)	Attendance: 5611

6 November 2012 16	Bradford City	0–0	Chesterfield	Coral Windows Stadium
19:45				Attendance: 8841

10 November 2012 17	Bristol Rovers	3–2	Chesterfield	Memorial Stadium
15:00	Togwell 5' (O.G.); Anyinsah 55'; Eaves 80'		Randall 20'; Dickenson 65'	Attendance: 5491

17 November 2012 18	Chesterfield	2–1	Oxford United	Proact Stadium
15:00	Cooper 45+4'; Atkinson 90+2'		Mullins 1'	Attendance: 5433

20 November 2012 19	Chesterfield	4–1	Cheltenham Town	Proact Stadium
19:45	Atkinson 16'; Togwell 45'; Richards 59'; Lester 75'		Mohamed 57'	Attendance: 4333

24 November 2012 20	Plymouth Argyle	0–1	Chesterfield	Home Park
15:00			Richards 66'	Attendance: 5711

8 December 2012 21	Port Vale	0–2	Chesterfield	Vale Park
15:00			O'Shea 37'; Darikwa 64'	Attendance: 5298

15 December 2012 22	Chesterfield	1–1	Burton Albion	Proact Stadium
15:00	Richards 74'		Maghoma 34'	Attendance: 5741

21 December 2012 23	Southend United	3–0	Chesterfield	Roots Hall Stadium
19:45	Cresswell 51'; Tomlin 61', 69'			Attendance: 5273

26 December 2012 24	Chesterfield	3–0	York City	Proact Stadium
15:00	Talbot 46'; Whitaker 75'; Darikwa 77'			Attendance: 7322

29 December 2012 25	Chesterfield	1–1	Morecambe	Proact Stadium
15:00	Townsend 40'		McCready 28'	Attendance: 6358

1 January 2013 26	Accrington Stanley	1–0	Chesterfield	Fraser Eagle Stadium
15:00	Boco 65'			Attendance: 1586

5 January 2013 27	Wycombe Wanderers	2–1	Chesterfield	Adams Park
15:00	Hause 45+1'; Kuffour 54'		O'Shea 29'	Attendance: 3492

12 January 2013 28	Chesterfield	3–0	Northampton Town	Proact Stadium
15:00	O'Shea 18'; Richards 19', 25'			Attendance: 5467

26 January 2013 29	Chesterfield	0–1	Southend United	Proact Stadium
15:00			Tomlin 83'	Attendance: 4817

2 February 2013 30	Rochdale	1–1	Chesterfield	Spotland Stadium
15:00	Grant 67'		O'Shea 56'	Attendance: 2746

9 February 2013 31	Chesterfield	2–0	AFC Wimbledon	Proact Stadium
15:00	Gnanduillet 59'; Lester 82'			Attendance: 5235

16 February 2013 32	Rotherham United	1–0	Chesterfield	New York Stadium
15:00	Mullins 56'			Attendance: 11143

23 February 2013 33	Chesterfield	0–1	Gillingham	Proact Stadium
15:00			McDonald 50'	Attendance: 5235

26 February 2013 34	Chesterfield	0–0	Aldershot Town	Proact Stadium
19:45				Attendance: 3968

2 March 2013 35	Dagenham & Redbridge	0–1	Chesterfield	Victoria Road
15:00			Ogogo 19' (O.G.)

5 March 2013 36	Cheltenham Town	1–0	Chesterfield	Whaddon Road
19:45	Benson 90+2'			Attendance: 2195

9 March 2013 37	Chesterfield	2–0	Bristol Rovers	Proact Stadium
15:00	O'Shea 52'; Gnanduillet 73'

16 March 2013 38	Oxford United	0–1	Chesterfield	Kassam Stadium
15:00			Richards 5'

19 March 2013 39	Torquay United	2–1	Chesterfield	Plainmoor
15:00	Labadie 1'; Howe 8'		Cooper 77'	Attendance: 2047

30 March 2013 40	Burton Albion	0–1	Chesterfield	Pirelli Stadium
15:00			Talbot 52'	Attendance: 3852

1 April 2013 41	Chesterfield	2–2	Port Vale	Proact Stadium
15:00	Richards 14', 19'		Purse 5'; Pope 85'	Attendance: 6669

6 April 2013 42	Barnet	0–2	Chesterfield	Underhill Stadium
15:00			O'Shea 57'; Togwell 78'	Attendance: 2574

13 April 2013 43	Chesterfield	2–2	Bradford City	Proact Stadium
15:00	Darikwa 70'; Togwell 90+3'		Wells 36'; Ravenhill 79'	Attendance: 7290

16 April 2013 44	Chesterfield	1–2	Plymouth Argyle	Proact Stadium
19:45	Branston 57 o.g.'		Bryan 21'; Nelson 26'	Attendance: 4988

20 April 2013 45	Fleetwood Town	1–3	Chesterfield	Highbury Stadium
15:00	Mangan 68'		Gnanduillet 44'; Richards 45+2', 65'	Attendance: 3705

27 April 2013 46	Chesterfield	4–0	Exeter City	Proact Stadium
15:00	O'Shea 22'; Richards 30'; Lester 34', 59'

=== F.A. Cup ===
3 November 2012 1st Round	Chesterfield	6–1	Hartlepool United	Proact Stadium
15:00	Boden 16'; Randall 29'; Clay 42'; Forbes 54'; Lester 79'; Westcarr 90'		Sweeney 78'	Attendance: 3083

1 December 2012 2nd Round	Tranmere Rovers	2–1	Chesterfield	Prenton Park
15:00	Stockten 41'; McGurk 57'		Cooper 30'	Attendance: 3781

=== League Cup ===
14 August 2012 1st Round	Chesterfield	1–2 (a.e.t.)	Tranmere Rovers	Proact Stadium
15:00	Lester 109'		Stockton 93'; Bell-Baggie 120+2'	Attendance: 3088

=== Football League Trophy ===
4 September 2012 1st Round Northern Section	Chesterfield	2–1	Oldham Athletic	Proact Stadium
19:00	Whitaker 48'; Smith 90+1' (O.G.)		Smith 23'	Attendance: 2384

9 October 2012 2nd Round Northern Section	Doncaster Rovers	1–0	Chesterfield	Keepmoat Stadium
19:00	Ball 83'			Attendance: 4030
