= Ryan Pryce (footballer) =

English footballer

Personal information
- Full name: Ryan Edward Pryce
- Date of birth: 30 June 1997 (age 29)
- Place of birth: Telford, England
- Position: Defender

Team information
- Current team: Treaddurr Bay

Youth career
- AFC Bournemouth

Senior career*
Years	Team	Apps	(Gls)
2007–2009	AFC Bournemouth	5	(0)
2010–2011	Salisbury City	8	(0)
2010	→ Gosport Borough (loan)	8	(0)
2011	Gosport Borough	10	(0)
2011–2013	Fleet Town	24	(0)
2015–	Fleet Town	75	(0)
2017-	Winchester City		
- * Club domestic league appearances and goals as of 23:49, 28 March 2017 (UTC)

Ryan Edward Pryce (born 30 June 1997) is an English footballer who plays as a defender for Treadurr Bay. He made five appearances in the English Football League for AFC Bournemouth.

== Playing career ==
=== AFC Bournemouth ===
Pryce started his career with AFC Bournemouth and made his debut against Southend United when Bournemouth were 4–1 down. On 3 September 2009, Bournemouth announced that Pryce had left the club by mutual consent.

=== Search for a club ===
Pryce announced on 4 December 2009 he was in talks with Shrewsbury Town manager, Paul Simpson, over a coaching role at the club. This came after a number of different coaching roles with clubs throughout the Salisbury area. However, this came to nothing.

=== Salisbury City ===
Pryce was signed by Salisbury City to add cover for James Bittner in February 2010. He had to remain patient for the rest of the 2009–10 season, but this was rewarded with a contract extension at the end of the season.

The 2010–11 season saw Pryce in a constant battle for the number 1 shirt with fellow goalkeeper Tommy Smith. In October 2010, Pryce was loaned out to Gosport Borough to gain more first team experience.

=== Gosport Borough ===
During the summer of 2011, Pryce made his move to Gosport permanent.

=== Fleet Town ===
In November 2011, Pryce joined Southern Football League side Fleet Town, and made his debut against Northwood on 12 November in a 4–1 home defeat.
