= 2014–15 Huddersfield Town A.F.C. season =

Huddersfield Town
2014–15 season
- Chairman: Dean Hoyle
- Manager: Mark Robins (until 10 August 2014); Mark Lillis (from 11 August 2014 until 3 September 2014); Chris Powell (from 3 September 2014)
- Stadium: John Smith's Stadium
- Championship: 16th
- FA Cup: Third round (eliminated by Reading)
- League Cup: Second round (eliminated by Nottingham Forest)
- Top goalscorer: League: Nahki Wells (11); All: Nahki Wells (14)
- Highest home attendance: 20,029 vs. Leeds United (31 January 2015)
- Lowest home attendance: 6,509 vs. Nottingham Forest (26 August 2014)
- Biggest win: 3–0 vs Nottingham Forest (1 November 2014); 3–0 vs Reading (24 February 2015)
- Biggest defeat: 0–5 vs Norwich City (13 December 2014)
| Home colours | Away colours | Third colours |

The 2014–15 Huddersfield Town A.F.C. season was Huddersfield Town A.F.C.'s third consecutive edition in the second tier of English football, the Football League Championship.

After losing their first game of the season, a 4–0 home loss to AFC Bournemouth, manager Mark Robins was relieved of his duties the following day. After 3 weeks of caretaker charge under Academy Manager Mark Lillis, the former Charlton Athletic manager, Chris Powell, was appointed as the new permanent manager on 3 September 2014.

== Squad at the end of the season ==
Note: Flags indicate national team as defined under FIFA eligibility rules; some limited exceptions apply. Players may hold more than one non-FIFA nationality.

| No. | Pos. | Nation | Player |
|---|---|---|---|
| 1 | GK | ENG | Alex Smithies |
| 2 | DF | CAN | David Edgar (on loan from Birmingham City) |
| 3 | DF | ENG | Reece James (on loan from Manchester United) |
| 4 | DF | ENG | Mark Hudson (captain) |
| 5 | DF | IRL | Anthony Gerrard (on loan at Oldham Athletic) |
| 6 | MF | ENG | Jonathan Hogg |
| 7 | MF | IRL | Sean Scannell |
| 8 | MF | ENG | Jacob Butterfield |
| 9 | FW | ENG | James Vaughan |
| 10 | MF | ENG | Conor Coady |
| 11 | FW | ENG | Ishmael Miller |
| 12 | MF | ENG | Adam Hammill (on loan at Rotherham United) |
| 13 | GK | IRL | Joe Murphy |
| 14 | FW | ENG | Jon Stead (on loan at Bradford City) |
| 15 | DF | SCO | Murray Wallace |
| 18 | MF | ENG | Joe Lolley |
| 19 | MF | USA | Duane Holmes |
| 21 | FW | BER | Nahki Wells |
| 24 | FW | NIR | Martin Paterson (on loan at Orlando City) |

| No. | Pos. | Nation | Player |
|---|---|---|---|
| 25 | DF | IRL | Jake Carroll |
| 26 | FW | ENG | Daniel Carr (on loan at Dagenham & Redbridge) |
| 27 | DF | ENG | Tommy Smith |
| 28 | MF | ENG | Oscar Gobern |
| 29 | MF | DEN | Philip Billing |
| 30 | FW | ENG | Harry Bunn |
| 31 | GK | ENG | Lloyd Allinson |
| 32 | MF | NOR | Sondre Tronstad |
| 33 | DF | WAL | Joel Lynch |
| 34 | FW | WAL | Jake Charles |
| 35 | FW | ALB | Flo Bojaj |
| 36 | GK | POL | Ed Wilczynski (on loan at Hyde) |
| 38 | DF | SCO | Will Boyle (on loan at Kidderminster Harriers) |
| 39 | DF | ENG | Joe Wilkinson |
| 40 | MF | ENG | Ben Holmes |
| 41 | GK | ENG | Sam Guthrie |
| 42 | MF | ENG | Ben Atkinson |
| 43 | DF | WAL | Joe Wright |
| 45 | MF | POL | Radosław Majewski (on loan from Nottingham Forest) |

== Kit ==
The 2014–15 season was the club's second with technical kit supplier Puma. Rekorderlig Cider and Radian B continued their sponsorships of the home and away shirts, respectively.

The new home kit was revealed on 27 June, and features a light blue and white striped shirt, white shorts, and black socks for the fourth year running. The blue stripes on the shirt start below the crest and fade out to a lighter blue at the bottom of the shirt, interrupted by the logo of main sponsor Rekorderlig. A similar gradient pattern flows down the sleeves. The collar and trim of the shirt is in a darker shade of blue. White socks were worn with the home kit during the away game at Wolves in October, where both change strips were deemed to clash with the opposition.

The away kit was revealed on 18 July, and consists of a red and black hooped shirt, black shorts, and red and black hooped socks. The red hoops on the shirt each contain thinner black hoops, and are bounded by thin white hoops, also containing thinner black hoops. Alternative red shorts were worn during the away games at Watford and Fulham.

The limited edition Brazil-esque third kit was revealed on 13 August, consisting of a yellow shirt with blue diagonal pinstripes, blue shorts, and white socks. Like in the previous season, the third kit was introduced to give a Thornton & Ross brand (in this case, Covonia) an airing where the away kit can not be worn, as per their sponsorship agreement with the club.

The main goalkeeper kit is in a shade of "beetroot purple", with alternative kits in orange, black and green. The black goalkeeper shirt from the previous season also made an appearance on more than one occasion.

Supplier: Puma
Sponsor(s): Rekorderlig Cider (home), Radian B (away), Covonia (third)

| Home | Home alt. | Away | Away alt. | Third | GK (1) | GK (2) | GK (2) alt. | GK (3) | GK (4) | GK (5) |

Last updated: 25 March 2015.
Source: The Championship 2014–2015 - Historical Football kits

== Transfers ==
=== In ===
| Date | Position | Name | From | Fee | Reference |
|---|---|---|---|---|---|
| 17 June 2014 | GK | (Republic of Ireland) Joe Murphy | (England) Coventry City | Free | |
| 23 June 2014 | DF | (England) Lee Peltier | (England) Leeds United | Free | |
| 6 August 2014 | MF | (England) Conor Coady | (England) Liverpool | £375,000 | |
| 13 August 2014 | MF | (England) Jacob Butterfield | (England) Middlesbrough | Swap | |
| 13 August 2014 | FW | (Scotland) Liam Coogans | (Scotland) Airdrieonians | Undisclosed Fee | |
| 31 August 2014 | DF | (England) Mark Hudson | (Wales) Cardiff City | Undisclosed Fee | |
| 2 February 2015 | FW | (England) Ishmael Miller | (England) Blackpool | Undisclosed Fee | |

=== Loans in ===
| Date | Position | Name | From | Expiry | Reference |
|---|---|---|---|---|---|
| 29 July 2014 | MF | (Poland) Radosław Majewski | (England) Nottingham Forest | Season-Long Loan | |
| 28 August 2014 | DF | (England) Jack Robinson | (England) Queens Park Rangers | 19 March 2015 | |
| 27 September 2014 | FW | (England) Grant Holt | (England) Wigan Athletic | 28 December 2014 | |
| 6 November 2014 | MF | (England) Diego Poyet | (England) West Ham United | 6 December 2014 | |
| 21 January 2015 | DF | (Canada) David Edgar | (England) Birmingham City | End Of Season | |
| 26 March 2015 | DF | (England) Reece James | (England) Manchester United | End Of Season | |

=== Out ===
| Date | Position | Name | From | Fee | Reference |
|---|---|---|---|---|---|
| 5 May 2014 | GK | (England) Ian Bennett | Retired | —N/a | |
| 5 May 2014 | MF | (England) Anton Robinson | Released | Free | |
| 9 June 2014 | DF | (England) Calum Woods | (England) Preston North End | Free | |
| 20 June 2014 | MF | (England) Keith Southern | (England) Fleetwood Town | Free | |
| 22 July 2014 | MF | (England) Chris Atkinson | (England) Crewe Alexandra | Free | |
| 22 July 2014 | FW | (Spain) Cristian López | (Spain) Burgos | Free | |
| 28 July 2014 | DF | (England) Peter Clarke | (England) Blackpool | Free | |
| 2 August 2014 | FW | (England) Paul Mullin | (England) Morecambe | Free | |
| 13 August 2014 | MF | (England) Adam Clayton | (England) Middlesbrough | Swap+undisclosed | |
| 21 August 2014 | MF | (Northern Ireland) Oliver Norwood | (England) Reading | Undisclosed | |
| 12 January 2015 | MF | (England) Danny Ward | (England) Rotherham United | Undisclosed | |
| 24 January 2015 | DF | (England) Lee Peltier | (Wales) Cardiff City | Undisclosed | |
| 2 February 2015 | DF | (England) Matt Crooks | (England) Accrington Stanley | Free | |
| 2 February 2015 | DF | (Scotland) Paul Dixon | (Scotland) Dundee United | Free | |
| 2 February 2015 | MF | (England) Jordan Sinnott | (England) Altrincham | Free | |

=== Loans out ===
| Date | Position | Name | From | Expiry | Reference |
|---|---|---|---|---|---|
| 29 August 2014 | DF | (Republic of Ireland) Jake Carroll | (Scotland) Partick Thistle | 2 January 2015 | |
| 30 August 2014 | MF | (United States) Duane Holmes | (England) Bury | 29 October 2014 | |
| 17 October 2014 | FW | (England) Jon Stead | (England) Bradford City | 4 January 2015 | |
| 21 October 2014 | MF | (England) Matt Crooks | (England) Hartlepool United | 17 November 2014 | |
| 21 October 2014 | FW | (England) Daniel Carr | (England) Mansfield Town | 17 November 2014 | |
| 23 October 2014 | MF | (England) Oscar Gobern | (England) Chesterfield | 13 November 2014 | |
| 6 November 2014 | GK | (England) Sam Guthrie | (England) Salford City | 2 December 2014 | |
| 6 November 2014 | GK | (Poland) Ed Wilczynski | (England) Trafford | 2 December 2014 | |
| 13 November 2014 | FW | (Northern Ireland) Martin Paterson | (England) Fleetwood Town | 4 December 2014 | |
| 20 November 2014 | DF | (England) Matt Crooks | (England) Accrington Stanley | 3 January 2015 | |
| 8 January 2015 | FW | (England) Jon Stead | (England) Bradford City | 30 June 2015 | |
| 9 January 2015 | MF | (England) Adam Hammill | (England) Rotherham United | 30 June 2015 | |
| 9 January 2015 | MF | (England) Danny Ward | (England) Rotherham United | 12 January 2015 | |
| 26 January 2015 | FW | (Northern Ireland) Martin Paterson | (United States) Orlando City | 30 June 2015 | |
| 30 January 2015 | MF | (England) Ben Holmes | (England) Hyde | 28 March 2015 | |
| 2 February 2015 | FW | (England) Daniel Carr | (England) Dagenham & Redbridge | 30 June 2015 | |
| 5 February 2015 | GK | (Poland) Ed Wilczynski | (England) Hyde | 8 March 2015 | |
| 19 March 2015 | DF | (Republic of Ireland) Anthony Gerrard | (England) Oldham Athletic | 30 June 2015 | |
| 26 March 2015 | DF | (Scotland) Will Boyle | (England) Kidderminster Harriers | 30 June 2015 | |
| 9 May 2015 | GK | (Republic of Ireland) Joe Murphy | (England) Chesterfield | 16 May 2015 | |

== Squad statistics ==
=== Appearances and goals ===
| No. | Pos | Nat | Player | Total | | Championship | | FA Cup | | League Cup | |
| No. | Pos | Nat | Player | Apps | Goals | Apps | Goals | Apps | Goals | Apps | Goals |
|---|---|---|---|---|---|---|---|---|---|---|---|
| 1 | GK | (England) ENG | Alex Smithies | 45 | 0 | 44 | 0 | 1 | 0 | 0 | 0 |
| 2 | DF | (Canada) CAN | David Edgar | 12 | 0 | 9+3 | 0 | 0 | 0 | 0 | 0 |
| 3 | DF | (Scotland) SCO | Paul Dixon | 13 | 0 | 8+3 | 0 | 0 | 0 | 2 | 0 |
| 3 | DF | (England) ENG | Reece James | 6 | 1 | 6 | 1 | 0 | 0 | 0 | 0 |
| 4 | DF | (England) ENG | Mark Hudson | 42 | 2 | 41 | 2 | 1 | 0 | 0 | 0 |
| 4 | MF | (Northern Ireland) NIR | Oliver Norwood | 2 | 0 | 1 | 0 | 0 | 0 | 1 | 0 |
| 5 | DF | (Republic of Ireland) IRL | Anthony Gerrard | 4 | 0 | 1+2 | 0 | 0+1 | 0 | 0 | 0 |
| 6 | MF | (England) ENG | Jonathan Hogg | 27 | 0 | 23+3 | 0 | 1 | 0 | 0 | 0 |
| 7 | MF | (Republic of Ireland) IRL | Sean Scannell | 45 | 4 | 37+5 | 4 | 0+1 | 0 | 1+1 | 0 |
| 8 | MF | (England) ENG | Jacob Butterfield | 46 | 6 | 45 | 6 | 0 | 0 | 1 | 0 |
| 9 | FW | (England) ENG | James Vaughan | 28 | 7 | 21+5 | 7 | 1 | 0 | 0+1 | 0 |
| 10 | MF | (England) ENG | Conor Coady | 48 | 3 | 42+3 | 3 | 1 | 0 | 2 | 0 |
| 11 | FW | (England) ENG | Ishmael Miller | 16 | 3 | 9+7 | 3 | 0 | 0 | 0 | 0 |
| 11 | MF | (England) ENG | Danny Ward | 14 | 0 | 2+10 | 0 | 0 | 0 | 2 | 0 |
| 12 | MF | (England) ENG | Adam Hammill | 8 | 0 | 2+3 | 0 | 1 | 0 | 1+1 | 0 |
| 13 | GK | (Republic of Ireland) IRL | Joe Murphy | 4 | 0 | 2 | 0 | 0 | 0 | 2 | 0 |
| 14 | FW | (England) ENG | Jon Stead | 9 | 2 | 2+5 | 1 | 0 | 0 | 2 | 1 |
| 15 | DF | (Scotland) SCO | Murray Wallace | 29 | 2 | 15+11 | 2 | 1 | 0 | 2 | 0 |
| 16 | FW | (England) ENG | Grant Holt | 15 | 2 | 14+1 | 2 | 0 | 0 | 0 | 0 |
| 17 | DF | (England) ENG | Jack Robinson | 31 | 0 | 30 | 0 | 1 | 0 | 0 | 0 |
| 18 | MF | (England) ENG | Joe Lolley | 19 | 3 | 3+14 | 2 | 0+1 | 0 | 0+1 | 1 |
| 19 | MF | (United States) USA | Duane Holmes | 1 | 0 | 0 | 0 | 0 | 0 | 0+1 | 0 |
| 20 | MF | (England) ENG | Jordan Sinnott | 1 | 0 | 0+1 | 0 | 0 | 0 | 0 | 0 |
| 21 | FW | (Bermuda) BER | Nahki Wells | 37 | 14 | 29+6 | 11 | 1 | 0 | 1 | 3 |
| 22 | DF | (England) ENG | Matt Crooks | 1 | 0 | 1 | 0 | 0 | 0 | 0 | 0 |
| 24 | FW | (Northern Ireland) NIR | Martin Paterson | 3 | 0 | 0+3 | 0 | 0 | 0 | 0 | 0 |
| 25 | DF | (Republic of Ireland) IRL | Jake Carroll | 2 | 0 | 1+1 | 0 | 0 | 0 | 0 | 0 |
| 27 | DF | (England) ENG | Tommy Smith | 44 | 0 | 40+1 | 0 | 1 | 0 | 2 | 0 |
| 28 | MF | (England) ENG | Oscar Gobern | 12 | 1 | 7+5 | 1 | 0 | 0 | 0 | 0 |
| 30 | FW | (England) ENG | Harry Bunn | 32 | 9 | 24+6 | 9 | 1 | 0 | 1 | 0 |
| 33 | DF | (Wales) WAL | Joel Lynch | 35 | 3 | 34 | 3 | 0 | 0 | 1 | 0 |
| 34 | FW | (Wales) WAL | Jake Charles | 1 | 0 | 0+1 | 0 | 0 | 0 | 0 | 0 |
| 37 | DF | (England) ENG | Lee Peltier | 12 | 0 | 8+3 | 0 | 0 | 0 | 1 | 0 |
| 38 | DF | (Scotland) SCO | Will Boyle | 1 | 0 | 0+1 | 0 | 0 | 0 | 0 | 0 |
| 39 | DF | (England) ENG | Joe Wilkinson | 1 | 0 | 1 | 0 | 0 | 0 | 0 | 0 |
| 44 | MF | (England) ENG | Diego Poyet | 2 | 0 | 2 | 0 | 0 | 0 | 0 | 0 |
| 45 | MF | (Poland) POL | Radosław Majewski | 9 | 0 | 3+5 | 0 | 0 | 0 | 0+1 | 0 |

=== Top scorers ===
| Place | Position | Nation | Number | Name | Championship | FA Cup | League Cup | Total |
|---|---|---|---|---|---|---|---|---|
| 1 | FW | (Bermuda) | 21 | Nahki Wells | 11 | 0 | 3 | 14 |
| 2 | FW | (England) | 30 | Harry Bunn | 9 | 0 | 0 | 9 |
| 3 | FW | (England) | 9 | James Vaughan | 7 | 0 | 0 | 7 |
| 4 | MF | (England) | 8 | Jacob Butterfield | 6 | 0 | 0 | 6 |
| 5 | MF | (Republic of Ireland) | 7 | Sean Scannell | 4 | 0 | 0 | 4 |
| 6= | MF | (England) | 10 | Conor Coady | 3 | 0 | 0 | 3 |
| 6= | FW | (England) | 11 | Ishmael Miller | 3 | 0 | 0 | 3 |
| 6= | MF | (England) | 18 | Joe Lolley | 2 | 0 | 1 | 3 |
| 6= | DF | (Wales) | 33 | Joel Lynch | 3 | 0 | 0 | 3 |
| 10= | DF | (England) | 4 | Mark Hudson | 2 | 0 | 0 | 2 |
| 10= | FW | (England) | 14 | Jon Stead | 1 | 0 | 1 | 2 |
| 10= | DF | (Scotland) | 15 | Murray Wallace | 2 | 0 | 0 | 2 |
| 10= | FW | (England) | 16 | Grant Holt | 2 | 0 | 0 | 2 |
| 14= | DF | (England) | 3 | Reece James | 1 | 0 | 0 | 1 |
| 14= | MF | (England) | 28 | Oscar Gobern | 1 | 0 | 0 | 1 |
| 14= | | | | Own goals | 1 | 0 | 0 | 1 |
| | | | | TOTALS | 58 | 0 | 5 | 63 |

=== Disciplinary record ===
| Number | Nation | Position | Name | Championship | | FA Cup | | League Cup | | Total | |
| Number | Nation | Position | Name | Booked | Sent off (straight red) | Booked | Sent off (straight red) | Booked | Sent off (straight red) | Booked | Sent off (straight red) |
| 27 | (England) | DF | Tommy Smith | 8 | 0 | 1 | 0 | 0 | 0 | 9 | 0 |
| 9 | (England) | FW | James Vaughan | 8 | 1 | 0 | 0 | 0 | 0 | 8 | 1 |
| 4 | (England) | DF | Mark Hudson | 7 | 0 | 1 | 0 | 0 | 0 | 8 | 0 |
| 8 | (England) | MF | Jacob Butterfield | 7 | 0 | 0 | 0 | 0 | 0 | 7 | 0 |
| 33 | (Wales) | DF | Joel Lynch | 6 | 0 | 0 | 0 | 1 | 0 | 7 | 0 |
| 10 | (England) | MF | Conor Coady | 6 | 0 | 0 | 0 | 0 | 0 | 6 | 0 |
| 15 | (Scotland) | DF | Murray Wallace | 5 | 2 | 0 | 0 | 0 | 0 | 5 | 2 |
| 6 | (England) | MF | Jonathan Hogg | 3 | 0 | 2 | 1 | 0 | 0 | 5 | 1 |
| 30 | (England) | FW | Harry Bunn | 4 | 0 | 0 | 0 | 0 | 0 | 4 | 0 |
| 21 | (Bermuda) | FW | Nahki Wells | 3 | 1 | 0 | 0 | 0 | 0 | 3 | 1 |
| 17 | (England) | DF | Jack Robinson | 3 | 0 | 0 | 0 | 0 | 0 | 3 | 0 |
| 1 | (England) | GK | Alex Smithies | 2 | 0 | 0 | 0 | 0 | 0 | 2 | 0 |
| 3 | (England) | DF | Reece James | 2 | 0 | 0 | 0 | 0 | 0 | 2 | 0 |
| 37 | (England) | DF | Lee Peltier | 2 | 0 | 0 | 0 | 0 | 0 | 2 | 0 |
| 2 | (Canada) | DF | David Edgar | 1 | 0 | 0 | 0 | 0 | 0 | 1 | 0 |
| 3 | (Scotland) | DF | Paul Dixon | 1 | 0 | 0 | 0 | 0 | 0 | 1 | 0 |
| 4 | (Northern Ireland) | MF | Oliver Norwood | 1 | 0 | 0 | 0 | 0 | 0 | 1 | 0 |
| 5 | (Republic of Ireland) | DF | Anthony Gerrard | 1 | 0 | 0 | 0 | 0 | 0 | 1 | 0 |
| 16 | (England) | FW | Grant Holt | 1 | 0 | 0 | 0 | 0 | 0 | 1 | 0 |
| 28 | (England) | MF | Oscar Gobern | 1 | 0 | 0 | 0 | 0 | 0 | 1 | 0 |
| 44 | (England) | MF | Diego Poyet | 1 | 0 | 0 | 0 | 0 | 0 | 1 | 0 |
| | | | Totals | 73 | 4 | 4 | 1 | 1 | 0 | 78 | 5 |

== Match details ==
=== Pre-season and friendlies ===
| 12 July 2014 | Huddersfield Town | 3−1 | (Cyprus) AEL Limassol | Huddersfield |
| 12:00 BST | Wells; Norwood; Paterson | Report | ? 72' (pen.) | Stadium: PPG Canalside; Attendance: N/A |

| 15 July 2014 | Doncaster Rovers | 1−3 | Huddersfield Town | Olhão |
| 12:00 BST | Wellens ?' | Report | Vaughan ?', ?', ?' | Stadium: Estádio José Arcanjo |

| 19 July 2014 | Portimonense S.C. (Portugal) | 1−4 | Huddersfield Town | Albufeira |
| 18:00 BST | Fidélis 79' | Report | Lolley 11'; Clayton 26' (pen.); Vaughan 35'; Holgersson 60' | Stadium: Estádio da Nora |

| 21 July 2014 | Guiseley | 1–4 | Huddersfield Town | Guiseley |
| 19:45 BST | Boyes 63' | Report | D. Holmes 35'; Bunn 50'; Norwood 70'; Charles 83' | Stadium: Nethermoor Park |

| 25 July 2014 | Radcliffe Borough | 0−6 | Huddersfield Town XI | Radcliffe |
| 19:00 BST | | Report | Bunn 16', 58'; Stead 40'; B. Holmes 68'; Charles 70'; Bojaj 87' | Stadium: Stainton Park |

| 26 July 2014 | Scunthorpe United | 1–0 | Huddersfield Town | Scunthorpe |
| 15:00 BST | Madden 59' | Report | | Stadium: Glanford Park; Attendance: 1,003 |

| 29 July 2014 | Sheffield United | 0–1 | Huddersfield Town | Sheffield |
| 19:45 BST | | Report | Hammill 79' | Stadium: Bramall Lane; Attendance: 4,111 |

| 30 July 2014 | Stalybridge Celtic | 0–5 | Huddersfield Town XI | Stalybridge |
| 19:00 BST | | Report | Bunn 13'; Stead 21'; Bojaj 82'; Carr 89'; B. Holmes 90' | Stadium: Bower Fold |

| 2 August 2014 | Oldham Athletic | 3–1 | Huddersfield Town | Oldham |
| 15:00 BST | Dayton 35'; Kelly 38'; Clarke-Harris 73' | Report | Wells 69' | Stadium: SportsDirect.com Park; Attendance: 1,885 |

| 5 August 2014 | Huddersfield Town | 2–2 | Newcastle United | Huddersfield |
| 19:45 BST | Majewski 36'; Stead 66' | Report | Rivière 16'; Cabella 88' | Stadium: John Smith's Stadium; Attendance: 5,896 |

| 7 August 2014 | A.F.C. Emley | 0–2 | Huddersfield Town XI | Emley |
| 19:00 BST | | Report | Carr 2' (pen.); Tronstad 55' | Stadium: Welfare Ground |

=== Overview ===
| Competition | First match | Last match | Starting round | Final position | Record | | | | | | | |
| Competition | First match | Last match | Starting round | Final position | Pld | W | D | L | GF | GA | GD | Win % |
|---|---|---|---|---|---|---|---|---|---|---|---|---|
| Championship | 9 August 2014 | 2 May 2015 | Matchday 1 | 16th | 46 | 13 | 16 | 17 | 58 | 75 | −17 | 28.26 |
| FA Cup | 3 January 2015 | 3 January 2015 | Third round | Third round | 1 | 0 | 0 | 1 | 0 | 1 | −1 | 0.00 |
| League Cup | 12 August 2014 | 26 August 2014 | First round | Second round | 2 | 1 | 0 | 1 | 5 | 5 | +0 | 50.00 |
| Total | | | | | 49 | 14 | 16 | 19 | 63 | 81 | −18 | 28.57 |

Last updated: 2 May 2015
Source: Competitions

=== Results summary ===
| Overall | | | | | | | | Home | | | | | | Away | | | | | |
| Pld | W | D | L | GF | GA | GD | Pts | W | D | L | GF | GA | GD | W | D | L | GF | GA | GD |
|---|---|---|---|---|---|---|---|---|---|---|---|---|---|---|---|---|---|---|---|
| 46 | 13 | 16 | 17 | 58 | 75 | −17 | 55 | 8 | 8 | 7 | 34 | 34 | 0 | 5 | 8 | 10 | 24 | 41 | −17 |

Last updated: 2 May 2015.

=== Results by round ===
| Round | 1 | 2 | 3 | 4 | 5 | 6 | 7 | 8 | 9 | 10 | 11 | 12 | 13 | 14 | 15 | 16 | 17 | 18 | 19 | 20 | 21 | 22 | 23 | 24 | 25 | 26 | 27 | 28 | 29 | 30 | 31 | 32 | 33 | 34 | 35 | 36 | 37 | 38 | 39 | 40 | 41 | 42 | 43 | 44 | 45 | 46 |
|---|---|---|---|---|---|---|---|---|---|---|---|---|---|---|---|---|---|---|---|---|---|---|---|---|---|---|---|---|---|---|---|---|---|---|---|---|---|---|---|---|---|---|---|---|---|---|
| Ground | H | A | A | H | A | H | H | A | H | A | A | H | H | A | H | A | A | H | A | H | A | H | A | H | H | A | A | H | A | H | A | H | H | A | A | H | A | H | H | A | H | A | A | H | H | A |
| Result | L | L | W | D | L | L | D | L | W | W | D | W | D | D | W | L | L | D | L | W | L | L | D | W | W | L | W | L | W | L | D | D | W | L | L | L | D | D | L | D | W | W | D | D | D | D |
| Position | 24 | 24 | 20 | 20 | 21 | 21 | 22 | 22 | 20 | 18 | 18 | 17 | 16 | 17 | 14 | 15 | 16 | 14 | 19 | 15 | 17 | 20 | 19 | 18 | 15 | 17 | 15 | 17 | 14 | 15 | 14 | 16 | 12 | 14 | 15 | 16 | 18 | 17 | 18 | 18 | 17 | 16 | 16 | 15 | 16 | 16 |

Updated to match(es) played on 2 May 2015. Source:
A = Away; H = Home; W = Win; D = Draw; L = Loss

=== League table ===
| Pos | Team | Pld | W | D | L | GF | GA | GD | Pts |
|---|---|---|---|---|---|---|---|---|---|
| 14 | Nottingham Forest | 46 | 15 | 14 | 17 | 71 | 69 | +2 | 59 |
| 15 | Leeds United | 46 | 15 | 11 | 20 | 50 | 61 | −11 | 56 |
| 16 | Huddersfield Town | 46 | 13 | 16 | 17 | 58 | 75 | −17 | 55 |
| 17 | Fulham | 46 | 14 | 10 | 22 | 62 | 83 | −21 | 52 |
| 18 | Bolton Wanderers | 46 | 13 | 12 | 21 | 54 | 67 | −13 | 51 |

Updated to match(es) played on 2 May 2015. Source: Sky Sports
Rules for classification: 1) Points; 2) Goal difference; 3) Number of goals scored

=== Matches ===
| 9 August 2014 1 | Huddersfield Town | 0–4 | AFC Bournemouth | Huddersfield |
| 15:00 | Smithies (yellow card) 76'; Norwood (yellow card) 78' | | Pugh 1'; Wilson 32', 64'; Cook (yellow card) 40'; Kermorgant 50' | Stadium: John Smith's Stadium; Attendance: 12,371; Referee: Scott Duncan |

| 16 August 2014 2 | Cardiff City | 3–1 | Huddersfield Town | Cardiff |
| 15:00 | Whittingham 28'; Jones 35', 56' | | Wallace 45+3' (yellow card) 78'; Hogg (yellow card) 61'; Lynch (yellow card) 90+5' | Stadium: Cardiff City Stadium; Attendance: 20,749; Referee: Keith Hill |

| 19 August 2014 3 | Reading | 1–2 | Huddersfield Town | Reading |
| 20:00 | Pearce (yellow card) 42'; Pogrebnyak (yellow card) 76'; Cox 79' | | Butterfield 10'; Coady (yellow card) 35'; Bunn 38'; Smithies (yellow card) 90+1' | Stadium: Madejski Stadium; Attendance: 15,035; Referee: Stuart Attwell |

| 23 August 2014 4 | Huddersfield Town | 1–1 | Charlton Athletic | Huddersfield |
| 15:00 | Peltier (yellow card) 44'; Wallace (red card) 45+2'; Wells 50'; Bunn (yellow card) 81'; Vaughan (yellow card) 90+3' | | Wiggins (yellow card) 28'; Vetokele 90+2' | Stadium: John Smith's Stadium; Attendance: 11,333; Referee: Tim Robinson |

| 30 August 2014 5 | Watford | 4–2 | Huddersfield Town | Watford |
| 15:00 | Deeney 15' (yellow card) 90+4'; Munari (yellow card) 35'; Abdi 54', 90+4'; Tamaș (yellow card) 60' (yellow-red card) 65'; Andrews 68' | | Lynch (yellow card) 12'; Dixon (yellow card) 32'; Vaughan (yellow card) 38'; Bunn 48'; Coady (yellow card) 62'; Wallace 63' (yellow card) 67' | Stadium: Vicarage Road; Attendance: 14,409; Referee: Neil Swarbrick |

| 13 September 2014 6 | Huddersfield Town | 1–2 | Middlesbrough | Huddersfield |
| 15:00 | Butterfield (yellow card) 9'; Vaughan (yellow card) 19'; Stead 86' | | Friend (yellow card) 26'; Leadbitter 36', 90+2' (pen.); Clayton (yellow card) 84' | Stadium: John Smith's Stadium; Attendance: 17,993; Referee: Kevin Wright |

| 16 September 2014 7 | Huddersfield Town | 0–0 | Wigan Athletic | Huddersfield |
| 19:45 | Smith (yellow card) 26' | | McManaman (yellow card) 35'; Ramis (yellow card) 54' | Stadium: John Smith's Stadium; Attendance: 11,083; Referee: Seb Stocksbridge |

| 20 September 2014 8 | Leeds United | 3–0 | Huddersfield Town | Leeds |
| 15:00 | Austin 20'; Berardi (yellow card) 24' (yellow-red card) 73'; Bellusci (yellow card) 26'; Antenucci 45+1'; Doukara 69' (yellow card) 70' | | Lynch (yellow card) 90' | Stadium: Elland Road; Attendance: 29,131; Referee: Chris Foy |

| 27 September 2014 9 | Huddersfield Town | 2–1 | Millwall | Huddersfield |
| 15:00 | Wells (yellow card) 23' (goal) 37', 57' (pen.); Smith (yellow card) 54' | | Upson 41'; Bailey (yellow card) 56'; Beevers (yellow card) 69'; Ranégie (yellow card) 79'; Dunne (yellow card) 82'; Williams (yellow card) 89' | Stadium: John Smith's Stadium; Attendance: 11,712; Referee: Carl Boyeson |

| 1 October 2014 10 | Wolverhampton Wanderers | 1–3 | Huddersfield Town | Wolverhampton |
| 19:45 | Stearman (yellow card) 48'; Sako 71' | | Bunn 21'; Scannell 39'; Coady 51' | Stadium: Molineux Stadium; Attendance: 19,059; Referee: Phil Gibbs |

| 4 October 2014 11 | Blackburn Rovers | 0–0 | Huddersfield Town | Blackburn |
| 15:00 | Hanley (yellow card) 54'; Williamson (yellow card) 71' | | Holt (yellow card) 11' | Stadium: Ewood Park; Attendance: 14,662; Referee: Nigel Miller |

| 18 October 2014 12 | Huddersfield Town | 4–2 | Blackpool | Huddersfield |
| 15:00 | Holt 4'; Bunn 11', 16'; Smith (yellow card) 36'; Butterfield 61'; Hogg (yellow card) 88' | | McMahon 45' (yellow card) 58'; Daniels 45+2'; Lundstram (yellow card) 68'; Delfouneso (yellow card) 90+4' | Stadium: John Smith's Stadium; Attendance: 14,238; Referee: Darren Bond |

| 21 October 2014 13 | Huddersfield Town | 1–1 | Brighton & Hove Albion | Huddersfield |
| 19:45 | Butterfield 10' | | Dunk (yellow card) 27' (goal) 39'; LuaLua (yellow card) 41' (yellow-red card) 90+3'; Gardner (yellow card) 62'; Greer (yellow card) 79' | Stadium: John Smith's Stadium; Attendance: 10,817; Referee: Gary Sutton |

| 25 October 2014 14 | Ipswich Town | 2–2 | Huddersfield Town | Ipswich |
| 15:00 | Smith 21'; Berra 55'; Hyam (yellow card) 69'; Chambers (yellow card) 70'; Skuse (yellow card) 76' | | Wells 70' (pen.), 82' | Stadium: Portman Road; Attendance: 16,751; Referee: Richard Clark |

| 1 November 2014 15 | Huddersfield Town | 3–0 | Nottingham Forest | Huddersfield |
| 15:00 | Lynch 1'; Wells 20'; Coady (yellow card) 51'; Holt 54' | | Lichaj (yellow card) 37'; Fox (yellow card) 68' | Stadium: John Smith's Stadium; Attendance: 15,317; Referee: Andy Davies |

| 4 November 2014 16 | Derby County | 3–2 | Huddersfield Town | Derby |
| 19:45 | Ibe 7' (yellow card) 41'; Russell 45+1'; Shotton (yellow card) 59'; Dawkins 77' | | Bunn 22' (yellow card) 75'; Smith (yellow card) 73'; Hudson 90+4' | Stadium: iPro Stadium; Attendance: 27,153; Referee: Keith Hill |

| 8 November 2014 17 | Fulham | 3–1 | Huddersfield Town | Fulham |
| 15:00 | Rodallega 19'; Christensen (yellow card) 36' (goal) 77'; Burn (yellow card) 51'; Zverotić (yellow card) 75'; McCormack 84' | | Lynch 75' | Stadium: Craven Cottage; Attendance: 17,734; Referee: Andy Woolmer |

| 22 November 2014 18 | Huddersfield Town | 0–0 | Sheffield Wednesday | Huddersfield |
| 12:15 | Poyet (yellow card) 83' | | Drenthe (yellow card) 20'; May (yellow card) 64'; Loovens (yellow card) 80'; Maguire (yellow card) 85' | Stadium: John Smith's Stadium; Attendance: 14,389; Referee: Graham Salisbury |

| 29 November 2014 19 | Bolton Wanderers | 1–0 | Huddersfield Town | Bolton |
| 15:00 | Davies 67'; C.Y. Lee (yellow card) 74'; Danns (yellow card) 79' | | Hudson (yellow card) 30'; Wallace (yellow card) 59' | Stadium: Macron Stadium; Attendance: 15,924; Referee: Carl Berry |

| 6 December 2014 20 | Huddersfield Town | 2–1 | Brentford | Huddersfield |
| 15:00 | Scannell 18'; Hudson (yellow card) 40'; Bidwell 48' (o.g.); Hogg (yellow card) 84'; Vaughan (yellow card) 85' | | Craig (yellow card) 42'; Douglas 70' (yellow card) 86'; Dean (yellow card) 79' | Stadium: John Smith's Stadium; Attendance: 13,038; Referee: Eddie Ilderton |

| 13 December 2014 21 | Norwich City | 5–0 | Huddersfield Town | Norwich |
| 15:00 | Johnson 46', 51'; Redmond 48'; Jerome 69'; Grabban 77' | | Wallace (red card) 17' | Stadium: Carrow Road; Attendance: 25,595; Referee: Mark Brown |

| 20 December 2014 22 | Huddersfield Town | 0–1 | Birmingham City | Huddersfield |
| 15:00 | Vaughan (yellow card) 83' | | Davis (yellow card) 45+1'; Cotterill 70' | Stadium: John Smith's Stadium; Attendance: 13,203; Referee: Jeremy Simpson |

| 26 December 2014 23 | Rotherham United | 2–2 | Huddersfield Town | Rotherham |
| 15:00 | Clarke-Harris 88'; Frecklington 90'; Smallwood (yellow card) 90+4'; Morgan (yellow card) 90+5' | | Wallace (yellow card) 24'; Hudson (yellow card) 29'; Vaughan 35'; Coady 61'; Gerrard (yellow card) 90+5' | Stadium: New York Stadium; Attendance: 11,681; Referee: Mark Haywood |

| 28 December 2014 24 | Huddersfield Town | 2–1 | Bolton Wanderers | Huddersfield |
| 15:00 | Smith (yellow card) 18'; Butterfield 43'; Wells 85' | | Pratley 1'; C.Y. Lee (yellow card) 87'; Danns (yellow card) 90+5' | Stadium: John Smith's Stadium; Attendance: 15,773; Referee: Trevor Kettle |

| 10 January 2015 25 | Huddersfield Town | 3–1 | Watford | Huddersfield |
| 15:00 | Hudson (yellow card) 46'; Wells 52'; Robinson (yellow card) 65'; Vaughan 77'; Lynch 83' | | Hoban (yellow card) 16'; Ighalo 65'; Layún (yellow card) 90+5' | Stadium: John Smith's Stadium; Attendance: 13,843; Referee: Chris Kavanagh |

| 17 January 2015 26 | Middlesbrough | 2–0 | Huddersfield Town | Middlesbrough |
| 15:00 | Gibson (yellow card) 14'; Tomlin 61', 90+4' (yellow card) 90'; Friend (yellow card) 86' | | Peltier (yellow card) 81' | Stadium: Riverside Stadium; Attendance: 18,576; Referee: Peter Bankes |

| 24 January 2015 27 | Wigan Athletic | 0–1 | Huddersfield Town | Wigan |
| 15:00 | Kvist (yellow card) 23'; Ridgewell (yellow card) 53'; Delort (yellow card) 90+1' | | Coady 82' | Stadium: DW Stadium; Attendance: 12,064; Referee: Stephen Martin |

| 31 January 2015 28 | Huddersfield Town | 1–2 | Leeds United | Huddersfield |
| 12:30 | Bunn 26'; Butterfield (yellow card) 41'; Lynch (yellow card) 45+1' | | Byram 7'; Taylor (yellow card) 35'; Austin (yellow card) 45+1'; Sharp 90' (yellow card) 90' | Stadium: John Smith's Stadium; Attendance: 20,029; Referee: Chris Foy |

| 7 February 2015 29 | Millwall | 1–3 | Huddersfield Town | Bermondsey |
| 15:00 | Upson (yellow card) 22'; Forde (yellow card) 23'; Maierhofer 28'; Williams (yellow card) 30' | | Scannell 17'; Butterfield (yellow card) 23' (goal) 74'; Wells (yellow card) 31' (yellow-red card) 51'; Wallace (yellow card) 55'; Edgar (yellow card) 56'; Vaughan 85' (pen.) | Stadium: The Den; Attendance: 10,281; Referee: Mike Jones |

| 10 February 2015 30 | Huddersfield Town | 1–4 | Wolverhampton Wanderers | Huddersfield |
| 19:45 | Bunn (yellow card) 15'; Smith (yellow card) 28'; Vaughan 63'; Butterfield (yellow card) 78' | | Dicko 12', 90+1' (yellow card) 81'; Coady 47' (o.g.); Afobe 61' (yellow card) 90+5' | Stadium: John Smith's Stadium; Attendance: 11,843; Referee: David Webb |

| 14 February 2015 31 | AFC Bournemouth | 1–1 | Huddersfield Town | Bournemouth |
| 15:00 | Kermorgant 16'; Arter (yellow card) 58' | | Vaughan 65' | Stadium: Goldsands Stadium; Attendance: 10,007; Referee: Gavin Ward |

| 21 February 2015 32 | Huddersfield Town | 0–0 | Cardiff City | Huddersfield |
| 15:00 | Smith (yellow card) 45+1' | | Gunnarsson (yellow card) 87'; Peltier (yellow card) 90+3' | Stadium: John Smith's Stadium; Attendance: 12,798; Referee: Mark Heywood |

| 24 February 2015 33 | Huddersfield Town | 3–0 | Reading | Huddersfield |
| 19:45 | Bunn 10'; Wells 55'; Miller 74' | | Kelly (yellow card) 12'; Obita (yellow card) 89' | Stadium: John Smith's Stadium; Attendance: 10,282; Referee: James Adcock |

| 28 February 2015 34 | Charlton Athletic | 3–0 | Huddersfield Town | Charlton |
| 15:00 | Guðmundsson 34'; Cousins (yellow card) 36'; Gomez (yellow card) 40'; Watt 48', 71' | | Robinson (yellow card) 89' | Stadium: The Valley; Attendance: 25,545; Referee: James Linington |

| 3 March 2015 35 | Brentford | 4–1 | Huddersfield Town | Brentford |
| 19:45 | Long 4', 51'; Pritchard 70'; Toral 90+3' | | Bunn 22' (yellow card) 45+1'; Butterfield (yellow card) 39'; Hudson (yellow card) 67' | Stadium: Griffin Park; Attendance: 9,625; Referee: Chris Kavanagh |

| 7 March 2015 36 | Huddersfield Town | 0–2 | Rotherham United | Huddersfield |
| 15:00 | Butterfield (yellow card) 43' | | Árnason (yellow card) 25' (goal) 44'; Frecklington (yellow card) 35' (yellow-red card) 74'; Sammon 60'; Broadfoot (yellow card) 70' | Stadium: John Smith's Stadium; Attendance: 13,342; Referee: Carl Boyeson |

| 14 March 2015 37 | Birmingham City | 1–1 | Huddersfield Town | Birmingham |
| 15:00 | Cotterill 10'; Tesche (yellow card) 37' | | Coady (yellow card) 9'; Robinson (yellow card) 16'; Lolley 27' | Stadium: St Andrew's; Attendance: 14,747; Referee: Paul Tierney |

| 17 March 2015 38 | Huddersfield Town | 2–2 | Norwich City | Huddersfield |
| 19:45 | Miller 55'; Lynch (yellow card) 75'; Vaughan (yellow card) 90+4' (yellow-red card) 90+6' (goal) 90+5' | | Johnson (yellow card) 7'; Hoolahan (yellow card) 67'; Martin (yellow card) 90+3'; Loza 90+8' (yellow card) 90+9' | Stadium: John Smith's Stadium; Attendance: 11,879; Referee: Nigel Miller |

| 21 March 2015 39 | Huddersfield Town | 0–2 | Fulham | Huddersfield |
| 15:00 | | | Kačaniklić 2'; Hoogland (yellow card) 45+1'; Smith (yellow card) 48'; Hutchinson (red card) 60'; Richards (yellow card) 72'; Bettinelli (yellow card) 72'; Fofana 90+6' (yellow card) 90+7' | Stadium: John Smith's Stadium; Attendance: 11,635; Referee: Richard Clark |

| 4 April 2015 40 | Sheffield Wednesday | 1–1 | Huddersfield Town | Sheffield |
| 15:00 | Buș 86' | | Coady (yellow card) 45'; Lynch (yellow card) 67'; Hudson (yellow card) 81'; Miller 89' | Stadium: Hillsborough Stadium; Attendance: 20,851; Referee: Mark Haywood |

| 6 April 2015 41 | Huddersfield Town | 2–1 | Ipswich Town | Huddersfield |
| 15:00 | Wells 12'; Vaughan 30' (yellow card) 90+4' | | Berra (yellow card) 36'; Smith (yellow card) 42'; Varney 48' | Stadium: John Smith's Stadium; Attendance: 13,231; Referee: Tony Harrington |

| 11 April 2015 42 | Nottingham Forest | 0–1 | Huddersfield Town | Nottingham |
| 15:00 | | | Scannell 43'; Gobern (yellow card) 51' | Stadium: City Ground; Attendance: 21,572; Referee: Darren Deadman |

| 14 April 2015 43 | Brighton & Hove Albion | 0–0 | Huddersfield Town | Brighton |
| 19:45 | Carayol (yellow card) 48'; Calderón (yellow card) 67'; Teixeira (yellow card) 76'; Bennett (yellow card) 86' | | Smith (yellow card) 20'; Coady (yellow card) 34'; James (yellow card) 72' | Stadium: Amex Stadium; Attendance: 23,270; Referee: Andy D'Urso |

| 18 April 2015 44 | Huddersfield Town | 4–4 | Derby County | Huddersfield |
| 15:00 | Gobern 38'; Hudson 41'; James 45+2' (yellow card) 90+2'; Wells 72'; Butterfield (yellow card) 78' | | Ince 16', 79'; Dawkins 52' (yellow card) 66'; Lingard 61' | Stadium: John Smith's Stadium; Attendance: 15,889; Referee: Dean Whitestone |

| 25 April 2015 45 | Huddersfield Town | 2–2 | Blackburn Rovers | Huddersfield |
| 15:00 | Butterfield 39'; Hudson (yellow card) 79'; Lolley 84' | | Gestede 26'; Rhodes 31'; Lenihan (yellow card) 53' | Stadium: John Smith's Stadium; Attendance: 17,056; Referee: Brendan Malone |

| 2 May 2015 46 | Blackpool | 0–0* | Huddersfield Town | Blackpool |
| 12:15 | O'Dea (yellow card) 30'; Clarke (yellow card) 41' | | | Stadium: Bloomfield Road; Attendance: ? Referee: Mick Russell |
Note: The match was abandoned after a pitch invasion on 48 minutes. The result was allowed to stand after a meeting of The Football League on 14 May 2015.

=== FA Cup ===
| 3 January 2015 Round Three | Huddersfield Town | 0–1 | Reading | Huddersfield |
| 15:00 | Smith (yellow card) 29'; Hudson (yellow card) 45+2'; Hogg (yellow card) 56' (yellow-red card) 90' | | Mackie (yellow card) 17'; Blackman 69'; Robson-Kanu (yellow card) 88'; Williams (yellow card) 90' | Stadium: John Smith's Stadium; Attendance: 7,980; Referee: Phil Gibbs |

=== League Cup ===
| 12 August 2014 Round One | Chesterfield | 3–5 (a.e.t.) | Huddersfield Town | Chesterfield |
| 19:45 | Humphreys 32'; Banks 45+1'; Doyle 71' | | Wells 58', 84' (pen.), 94'; Stead 90+2'; Lolley 98' | Stadium: Proact Stadium; Attendance: 4,569; Referee: Gary Sutton |

| 26 August 2014 Round Two | Huddersfield Town | 0–2 | Nottingham Forest | Huddersfield |
| 19:45 | Lynch (yellow card) 71' | | Vaughan 72' (o.g.); Lansbury 82' | Stadium: John Smith's Stadium; Attendance: 6,509; Referee: Mark Brown |
