= 2015–16 Huddersfield Town A.F.C. season =

Huddersfield Town
2015–16 season
- Chairman: Dean Hoyle
- Manager: Chris Powell (until 4 November 2015); Mark Lillis (from 4 November 2015 until 9 November 2015); David Wagner (from 9 November 2015)
- Stadium: John Smith's Stadium
- Championship: 19th
- FA Cup: Third round (eliminated by Reading)
- League Cup: First round (eliminated by Notts County)
- Top goalscorer: League: Nahki Wells (17); All: Nahki Wells (18)
- Highest home attendance: 17,118 vs. Leeds United (7 November 2015)
- Lowest home attendance: 4,238 vs. Notts County (11 August 2015)
- Biggest win: 5–0 vs Charlton Athletic (12 January 2016)
- Biggest defeat: 0–4 vs Bristol City (30 April 2016); 1–5 vs Brentford (7 May 2016)
Home colours	Away colours	Third colours

The 2015–16 season was Huddersfield Town's fourth consecutive season in the Championship and 107th year in existence. Along with competing in the Championship, the club participated in the FA Cup and League Cup. The season covers the period from 1 July 2015 to 30 June 2016.

On 9 November 2015, following the departure of Chris Powell a few days earlier, the German-American David Wagner became the first head coach of the club, and the first to be born outside the British Isles in the club's 107-year history.

== Squad at the start of the season ==
Note: Flags indicate national team as defined under FIFA eligibility rules; some limited exceptions apply. Players may hold more than one non-FIFA nationality.

No.	Pos.	Nation	Player
1	GK	ENG	Alex Smithies
2	DF	ENG	Tommy Smith
3	DF	AUS	Jason Davidson
4	MF	ENG	Dean Whitehead
5	DF	ENG	Mark Hudson (captain)
6	MF	ENG	Jonathan Hogg
7	MF	IRL	Sean Scannell
8	MF	ENG	Jacob Butterfield
9	FW	ENG	James Vaughan
11	FW	ENG	Ishmael Miller
13	GK	IRL	Joe Murphy

No.	Pos.	Nation	Player
14	DF	ENG	Martin Cranie
15	DF	SCO	Murray Wallace
17	FW	ENG	Harry Bunn
18	MF	ENG	Joe Lolley
19	MF	USA	Duane Holmes
20	FW	ENG	Jordy Hiwula
21	FW	BER	Nahki Wells
22	MF	ENG	Kyle Dempsey
25	MF	ENG	Adam Hammill
26	GK	ENG	Lloyd Allinson
33	DF	WAL	Joel Lynch

== Kit ==
The 2015–16 season was the club's third with technical kit supplier Puma. Pure Legal Limited became main sponsors of the home kit, taking over from previous sponsor Rekorderlig Cider, while Radian B & Covonia continued their sponsorships of the away and third shirts, respectively.

A special charity kit was worn for the home match vs Birmingham City in aid of the Town Foundation, and was sponsored by Johnstone's Paint.

Supplier: Puma
Sponsor(s): Pure Legal Limited (home), Radian B (away), Covonia (third), Johnstone's Paint (charity)

Home	Away	Third	Third alt.	Charity	GK (1)	GK (2)	GK (3)	GK (4)

Last updated: 26 June 2016.
Source: The Championship 2015–2016 - Historical Football kits

== Squad at the end of the season ==
Note: Flags indicate national team as defined under FIFA eligibility rules; some limited exceptions apply. Players may hold more than one non-FIFA nationality.

No.	Pos.	Nation	Player
1	GK	ENG	Jed Steer (on loan from Aston Villa)
2	DF	ENG	Tommy Smith
3	DF	AUS	Jason Davidson
4	MF	ENG	Dean Whitehead
5	DF	ENG	Mark Hudson (captain)
6	MF	ENG	Jonathan Hogg
7	MF	IRL	Sean Scannell
8	MF	ENG	Jamie Paterson (on loan from Nottingham Forest)
9	FW	ENG	James Vaughan (on loan at Birmingham City)
10	MF	ALG	Karim Matmour
11	FW	ENG	Ishmael Miller
13	GK	IRL	Joe Murphy
14	DF	ENG	Martin Cranie
16	MF	WAL	Emyr Huws (on loan from Wigan Athletic)
17	FW	ENG	Harry Bunn

No.	Pos.	Nation	Player
18	MF	ENG	Joe Lolley
19	MF	USA	Duane Holmes
20	FW	ENG	Jordy Hiwula (on loan at Walsall)
21	FW	BER	Nahki Wells
22	MF	ENG	Kyle Dempsey
24	MF	NED	Rajiv van La Parra (on loan from Wolverhampton Wanderers)
26	GK	ENG	Lloyd Allinson
29	MF	DEN	Philip Billing
33	DF	WAL	Joel Lynch
34	DF	SCO	Will Boyle (on loan at York City)
36	FW	ALB	Flo Bojaj
––	MF	ENG	Ben Holmes (on loan at Hyde United)
––	GK	POL	Ed Wilczynski (on loan at Bishop Auckland)
––	DF	ENG	Joe Wilkinson (on loan at Bradford (Park Avenue))
––	DF	WAL	Joe Wright (on loan at Accrington Stanley)

== Transfers ==
=== Transfers in ===
Date from	Position	Nationality	Name	From	Fee	Ref.
1 July 2015	LW	ENG	Callum Charlton	Brighouse Town	Free transfer	
1 July 2015	LB	AUS	Jason Davidson	West Bromwich Albion	Free transfer	
1 July 2015	CM	ENG	Dean Whitehead	Middlesbrough	Free transfer	
10 July 2015	AM	ENG	Kyle Dempsey	Carlisle United	£300,000	
17 July 2015	FW	ENG	Jordy Hiwula	Manchester City	Undisclosed	
22 July 2015	CB	ENG	Martin Cranie	Barnsley	Free transfer	
31 July 2015	AM	ENG	Jack Boyle	Youth system	—N/a	
20 January 2016	AM	ALG	Karim Matmour	Unattached	Free transfer	

Total spending: ▼£300,000

=== Transfers out ===
Date from	Position	Nationality	Name	To	Fee	Ref.
1 July 2015	CF	TRI	Daniel Carr	Cambridge United (Note: Following Carr's release he joined Cambridge United.)	Free transfer	
1 July 2015	LM	IRL	Jake Carroll	Hartlepool United (Note: Following Carroll's release he joined Hartlepool United.)	Free transfer	
1 July 2015	CB	IRL	Anthony Gerrard	Shrewsbury Town	Released	
1 July 2015	CM	ENG	Oscar Gobern	Queens Park Rangers (Note: Following Gobern's release he joined Queens Park Rangers.)	Released	
1 July 2015	CF	NIR	Martin Paterson	Blackpool	Released	
1 July 2015	CF	ENG	Jon Stead	Notts County (Note: Following Stead's release he joined Notts County.)	Free transfer	
3 July 2015	CM	ENG	Conor Coady	Wolverhampton Wanderers	£2,000,000	
20 August 2015	GK	ENG	Alex Smithies	Queens Park Rangers	£1,500,000	
1 September 2015	CM	ENG	Jacob Butterfield	Derby County	Undisclosed	
1 September 2015	RW	ENG	Adam Hammill	Barnsley	Mutual consent	
2 January 2016	DF	SCO	Murray Wallace	Scunthorpe United	Undisclosed	
13 February 2016	FW	SCO	Liam Coogans	Brechin City	Released	

Total income: ▲£3,500,000

=== Loans in ===
Date from	Position	Nationality	Name	From	Date until	Ref.
27 August 2015	LW	GAM	Mustapha Carayol	Middlesbrough	End of season	
27 August 2015	CM	WAL	Emyr Huws	Wigan Athletic	End of season	
1 September 2015	FW	ENG	Jamie Paterson	Nottingham Forest	End of season	
9 September 2015	CB	ENG	Elliott Ward	Bournemouth	7 October 2015	
11 September 2015	GK	ENG	Jed Steer	Aston Villa	9 October 2015	(Note: On 15 October 2015, Steer's loan at Huddersfield was extended until 11 November 2015.)
19 November 2015	LB	ENG	Ben Chilwell	Leicester City	3 January 2016	
2 January 2016	GK	ENG	Jed Steer	Aston Villa	31 May 2016	
8 January 2016	LB	ENG	James Husband	Middlesbrough	6 February 2016	
1 February 2016	FW	GHA	Elvis Manu	Brighton & Hove Albion	2 May 2016	
11 March 2016	MF	NED	Rajiv van La Parra	Wolverhampton Wanderers	31 May 2016	

=== Loans out ===
Date from	Position	Nationality	Name	To	Date until	Ref.
9 July 2015	CB	WAL	Joe Wright	Accrington Stanley	2 January 2016	
31 July 2015	LW	WAL	Jake Charles	Guiseley	29 August 2015	
5 August 2015	CB	SCO	Will Boyle	Macclesfield Town	2 September 2015	
25 August 2015	CB	SCO	Murray Wallace	Scunthorpe United	1 November 2015	(Note: On 28 September 2015, Wallace's loan at Scunthorpe was extended until 31 October 2015.)
27 August 2015	CF	ENG	Jordy Hiwula	Wigan Athletic	End of season	
28 August 2015	CM	ENG	Ben Holmes	AFC Fylde	30 September 2015	
2 September 2015	FW	SCO	Liam Coogans	Queen of the South	4 January 2016	
18 September 2015	GK	ENG	Sam Guthrie	Clitheroe	17 October 2015	
25 September 2015	MF	ENG	Joe Lolley	Scunthorpe United	1 November 2015	
14 October 2015	DF	ENG	Joe Wilkinson	Hyde United	14 November 2015	
30 October 2015	GK	POL	Ed Wilczynski	Hyde United	24 October 2015	
18 November 2015	CB	SCO	Will Boyle	York City	3 January 2016	
26 November 2015	FW	ENG	James Vaughan	Birmingham City	2 January 2016	
2 January 2016	GK	POL	Ed Wilczynski	Sheffield	30 January 2016	
8 January 2016	FW	ENG	James Vaughan	Birmingham City	30 June 2016	
20 February 2016	GK	POL	Ed Wilczynski	Bishop Auckland	19 March 2016	
26 February 2016	CB	SCO	Will Boyle	York City	26 May 2016	
4 March 2016	CF	ENG	Jordy Hiwula	Walsall	End of season	

== Squad statistics ==
=== Appearances and goals ===
No.	Pos	Nat	Player	Total		Championship		FA Cup		League Cup	
No.	Pos	Nat	Player	Apps	Goals	Apps	Goals	Apps	Goals	Apps	Goals
1	GK	(England) ENG	Alex Smithies	1	0	1	0	0	0	0	0
1	GK	(England) ENG	Jed Steer	38	0	38	0	0	0	0	0
2	DF	(England) ENG	Tommy Smith	39	1	33+3	0	2	1	1	0
3	DF	(Australia) AUS	Jason Davidson	30	1	26+1	1	2	0	1	0
4	DF	(England) ENG	Dean Whitehead	36	0	31+3	0	0+1	0	1	0
5	DF	(England) ENG	Mark Hudson	41	3	39	3	2	0	0	0
6	MF	(England) ENG	Jonathan Hogg	24	0	19+3	0	2	0	0	0
7	MF	(Republic of Ireland) IRL	Sean Scannell	30	1	20+9	1	1	0	0	0
8	MF	(England) ENG	Jacob Butterfield	6	1	5	1	0	0	0+1	0
8	FW	(England) ENG	Jamie Paterson	36	8	22+12	6	2	2	0	0
9	FW	(England) ENG	James Vaughan	4	0	0+4	0	0	0	0	0
10	MF	(The Gambia) GAM	Mustapha Carayol	15	3	9+6	3	0	0	0	0
10	MF	(Algeria) ALG	Karim Matmour	16	1	7+9	1	0	0	0	0
11	FW	(England) ENG	Ishmael Miller	21	1	12+6	1	0+2	0	1	0
12	DF	(England) ENG	Elliott Ward	5	0	5	0	0	0	0	0
13	GK	(Republic of Ireland) IRL	Joe Murphy	10	0	7	0	2	0	1	0
14	DF	(England) ENG	Martin Cranie	39	0	28+9	0	0+1	0	1	0
15	DF	(Scotland) SCO	Murray Wallace	3	1	1+1	0	0	0	1	1
15	DF	(England) ENG	James Husband	12	0	10+1	0	0+1	0	0	0
16	MF	(Wales) WAL	Emyr Huws	31	5	27+3	5	1	0	0	0
17	FW	(England) ENG	Harry Bunn	44	6	34+8	6	1	0	1	0
18	MF	(England) ENG	Joe Lolley	34	4	25+7	4	2	0	0	0
19	MF	(United States) USA	Duane Holmes	6	1	2+4	1	0	0	0	0
20	FW	(England) ENG	Jordy Hiwula	1	0	0	0	0	0	0+1	0
21	FW	(Bermuda) BER	Nahki Wells	47	18	39+5	17	2	1	1	0
22	MF	(England) ENG	Kyle Dempsey	24	1	10+11	1	1+1	0	1	0
24	MF	(Netherlands) NED	Rajiv van La Parra	8	0	7+1	0	0	0	0	0
25	MF	(England) ENG	Adam Hammill	2	0	0+1	0	0	0	0+1	0
25	DF	(England) ENG	Ben Chilwell	8	0	7+1	0	0	0	0	0
26	GK	(England) ENG	Lloyd Allinson	1	0	0+1	0	0	0	0	0
28	MF	(Ghana) GHA	Elvis Manu	5	0	0+5	0	0	0	0	0
29	MF	(Denmark) DEN	Philip Billing	13	1	8+5	1	0	0	0	0
33	DF	(Wales) WAL	Joel Lynch	40	2	34+3	2	2	0	1	0
34	DF	(Scotland) SCO	Will Boyle	1	0	0+1	0	0	0	0	0
36	FW	(Albania) ALB	Flo Bojaj	8	1	0+8	1	0	0	0	0

=== Top scorers ===
Place	Position	Nation	Number	Name	Championship	FA Cup	League Cup	Total
1	FW	(Bermuda)	21	Nahki Wells	17	1	0	18
2	FW	(England)	8	Jamie Paterson	6	2	0	8
3	FW	(England)	17	Harry Bunn	6	0	0	6
4	MF	(Wales)	16	Emyr Huws	5	0	0	5
5=	MF	(England)	18	Joe Lolley	4	0	0	4
5=				Own goals	4	0	0	4
7=	DF	(England)	5	Mark Hudson	3	0	0	3
7=	MF	(The Gambia)	10	Mustapha Carayol	3	0	0	3
9	DF	(Wales)	33	Joel Lynch	2	0	0	2
10=	DF	(England)	2	Tommy Smith	0	1	0	1
10=	DF	(Australia)	3	Jason Davidson	1	0	0	1
10=	MF	(Republic of Ireland)	7	Sean Scannell	1	0	0	1
10=	MF	(England)	8	Jacob Butterfield	1	0	0	1
10=	MF	(Algeria)	10	Karim Matmour	1	0	0	1
10=	FW	(England)	11	Ishmael Miller	1	0	0	1
10=	DF	(Scotland)	15	Murray Wallace	0	0	1	1
10=	MF	(United States)	19	Duane Holmes	1	0	0	1
10=	MF	(England)	22	Kyle Dempsey	1	0	0	1
10=	MF	(Denmark)	29	Philip Billing	1	0	0	1
10=	FW	(Albania)	36	Flo Bojaj	1	0	0	1
				TOTALS	59	4	1	64

=== Cards ===
Number	Nation	Position	Name	Championship		FA Cup		League Cup		Total	
Number	Nation	Position	Name	Booked	Sent off (straight red)	Booked	Sent off (straight red)	Booked	Sent off (straight red)	Booked	Sent off (straight red)
5	(England)	DF	Mark Hudson	13	0	0	0	0	0	13	0
4	(England)	MF	Dean Whitehead	11	0	0	0	0	0	11	0
33	(Wales)	DF	Joel Lynch	10	0	0	0	0	0	10	0
2	(England)	DF	Tommy Smith	8	1	0	0	0	0	8	1
6	(England)	MF	Jonathan Hogg	6	0	1	1	0	0	7	1
17	(England)	FW	Harry Bunn	5	0	0	0	1	0	6	0
14	(England)	DF	Martin Cranie	5	0	0	0	0	0	5	0
21	(Bermuda)	FW	Nahki Wells	4	0	1	0	0	0	5	0
3	(Australia)	DF	Jason Davidson	3	0	0	0	0	0	3	0
16	(Wales)	MF	Emyr Huws	3	0	0	0	0	0	3	0
22	(England)	MF	Kyle Dempsey	3	0	0	0	0	0	3	0
10	(The Gambia)	MF	Mustapha Carayol	2	0	0	0	0	0	2	0
15	(England)	DF	James Husband	2	0	0	0	0	0	2	0
29	(Denmark)	MF	Philip Billing	1	1	0	0	0	0	1	1
9	(England)	FW	James Vaughan	0	1	0	0	0	0	0	1
1	(England)	GK	Jed Steer	1	0	0	0	0	0	1	0
7	(Republic of Ireland)	MF	Sean Scannell	1	0	0	0	0	0	1	0
8	(England)	MF	Jacob Butterfield	1	0	0	0	0	0	1	0
8	(England)	MF	Jamie Paterson	1	0	0	0	0	0	1	0
10	(Algeria)	MF	Karim Matmour	1	0	0	0	0	0	1	0
15	(Scotland)	DF	Murray Wallace	0	0	0	0	1	0	1	0
18	(England)	MF	Joe Lolley	1	0	0	0	0	0	1	0
			Totals	82	3	2	1	2	0	86	4

== Competitions ==
=== Pre-season friendlies ===
On 15 May 2015, Huddersfield Town announced their first pre-season friendly ahead of the 2015–16 season against Guiseley. On 19 May 2015, a second friendly was announced against Barnsley. A day later, Huddersfield Town announced they will travel to Grimsby Town. A fourth friendly was announced on 21 May 2015 against Rochdale. On 1 July 2015, Huddersfield Town announced they will face Leyton Orient on 18 July 2015 in Spain. On 7 July 2015, Huddersfield Town finalised their pre-season schedule by confirming a home friendly against Spanish side Deportivo de La Coruña.

11 July 2015 Friendly	Guiseley	1–3	Huddersfield Town	Guiseley
15:00 BST	Boshell 45' (pen.)	Report	Wells 32'; Butterfield 42'; Lolley 89'	Stadium: Nethermoor Park; Attendance: 1,036

17 July 2015 Friendly	Radcliffe Borough	0–1	Huddersfield Town XI	Radcliffe
19:00 BST		Report	Coogans 49'	Stadium: Stainton Park

18 July 2015 Friendly	Huddersfield Town	2–0	Leyton Orient	Mijas, Spain
10:30 CEST	Lolley 35'; Baudry 67' (o.g.)	Report		Stadium: La Cala Resort

21 July 2015 Friendly	Grimsby Town	3–1	Huddersfield Town	Cleethorpes
15:00 BST	Arnold 14'; East 43'; Bogle 65'	Report	Smith 66'	Stadium: Blundell Park; Attendance: 1,420

22 July 2015 Friendly	A.F.C. Emley	1–4	Huddersfield Town XI	Emley
19:30 BST	Jordan 70'		Bojaj 28', 43', 74' (pen.); Porritt 83'	Stadium: Welfare Ground

25 July 2015 Friendly	Rochdale	4–3	Huddersfield Town	Rochdale
15:00 BST	Andrew 7'; Alessandra 14'; Camps 30', 38'	Report	Wells 23', 48'; Scannell 31'	Stadium: Spotland; Attendance: 1,165

28 July 2015 Friendly	Brighouse Town	2–1	Huddersfield Town XI	Brighouse
19:30 BST	Boafo 22' (pen.); Facey 76'	Report	Bojaj 86'	Stadium: St. Giles Road

29 July 2015 Friendly	Huddersfield Town	0–0	Deportivo de La Coruña	Huddersfield
19:45 BST		Report		Stadium: John Smith's Stadium; Attendance: 4,633; Referee: Robert Madley

1 August 2015 Friendly	Barnsley	2–1	Huddersfield Town	Barnsley
15:00 BST	Winnall 33'; Holgate 48'	Report	Wells 20'	Stadium: Oakwell; Attendance: 2,787

3 August 2015 Friendly	Stalybridge Celtic	2–4	Huddersfield Town XI	Stalybridge
19:30 BST	Wright 30'; Johnson 76'	Report	Booty 50'; Bojaj 55'; Pyke 79'; D. Holmes 88'	Stadium: Bower Fold

=== Overview ===
Competition	First match	Last match	Starting round	Final position	Record							
Competition	First match	Last match	Starting round	Final position	Pld	W	D	L	GF	GA	GD	Win %
Championship	8 August 2015	7 May 2016	Matchday 1	19th	46	13	12	21	59	70	−11	28.26
FA Cup	9 January 2016	19 January 2016	Third round	Third round	2	0	1	1	4	7	−3	0.00
League Cup	11 August 2015	11 August 2015	First round	First round	1	0	0	1	1	2	−1	0.00
Total					49	13	13	23	64	79	−15	26.53

Last updated: 7 May 2016
Source: Competitions

=== Championship ===
==== Results summary ====
Overall								Home						Away					
Pld	W	D	L	GF	GA	GD	Pts	W	D	L	GF	GA	GD	W	D	L	GF	GA	GD
46	13	12	21	59	70	−11	51	7	6	10	33	33	0	6	6	11	26	37	−11

Last updated: 7 May 2016.

==== Results by round ====
Round	1	2	3	4	5	6	7	8	9	10	11	12	13	14	15	16	17	18	19	20	21	22	23	24	25	26	27	28	29	30	31	32	33	34	35	36	37	38	39	40	41	42	43	44	45	46
Ground	A	H	H	A	H	A	A	H	H	A	A	H	H	A	A	H	A	H	A	H	H	A	H	A	A	H	H	A	H	A	A	H	A	H	A	H	H	A	H	A	H	A	A	H	A	H
Result	L	D	D	D	L	L	W	W	D	L	D	W	L	L	D	L	L	L	W	L	W	L	W	D	W	W	D	L	L	L	W	W	D	L	L	W	L	W	L	L	D	W	D	D	L	L
Position	22	20	18	20	22	23	20	13	13	17	17	13	15	16	18	19	21	22	19	20	19	19	19	18	18	16	16	17	17	17	17	15	16	17	18	18	18	16	18	18	19	16	16	16	19	19

Updated to match(es) played on 7 May 2016. Source:
A = Away; H = Home; W = Win; D = Draw; L = Loss

==== League table ====
Pos	Team	Pld	W	D	L	GF	GA	GD	Pts
17	Reading	46	13	13	20	52	59	−7	52
18	Bristol City	46	13	13	20	54	71	−17	52
19	Huddersfield Town	46	13	12	21	59	70	−11	51
20	Fulham	46	12	15	19	66	79	−13	51
21	Rotherham United	46	13	10	23	53	71	−18	49

Source: BBC Sport
Rules for classification: 1) Points; 2) Goal difference; 3) Number of goals scored

==== Matches ====
On 17 June 2015, the fixtures for the forthcoming season were announced.

8 August 2015 1	Hull City	2–0	Huddersfield Town	Kingston upon Hull
15:00 BST	Hayden (yellow card) 30'; Clucas 39'; Akpom 71'		Smith (yellow card) 28'; Hudson (yellow card) 68'; Bunn (yellow card) 86'	Stadium: KC Stadium; Attendance: 19,361; Referee: Keith Hill

15 August 2015 2	Huddersfield Town	1–1	Blackburn Rovers	Huddersfield
15:00 BST	Wells 10'; Hudson (yellow card) 31'; Whitehead (yellow card) 46'		Delfouneso 60'	Stadium: John Smith's Stadium; Attendance: 11,338; Referee: Peter Bankes

18 August 2015 3	Huddersfield Town	1–1	Brighton & Hove Albion	Huddersfield
19:45 BST	Lynch (yellow card) 7'; Butterfield 54' (yellow card) 82'		Kayal 1'; Bong (yellow card) 39'; Stephens (yellow card) 45'; Bruno (yellow card) 90'	Stadium: John Smith's Stadium; Attendance: 10,168; Referee: Eddie Ilderton

22 August 2015 4	Fulham	1–1	Huddersfield Town	Fulham
15:00 BST	Cairney (yellow card) 78'; Woodrow 90+4'		Wells 63'; Hudson (yellow card) 77'; Davidson (yellow card) 78'	Stadium: Craven Cottage; Attendance: 14,283; Referee: James Adcock

29 August 2015 5	Huddersfield Town	0–1	Queens Park Rangers	Huddersfield
15:00 BST	Hogg (yellow card) 63'		Konchesky (yellow card) 61'; Chery 84'; Perch (yellow card) 90+1'; Phillips (yellow card) 90+3'	Stadium: John Smith's Stadium; Attendance: 11,189; Referee: Kevin Wright

12 September 2015 6	Cardiff City	2–0	Huddersfield Town	Cardiff
15:00 BST	Pilkington 69'; Mason 77'; Fábio (yellow card) 90+3'		Hogg (yellow card) 16'	Stadium: Cardiff City Stadium; Attendance: 13,715; Referee: Paul Tierney

15 September 2015 7	Charlton Athletic	1–2	Huddersfield Town	Charlton
19:45 BST	Sarr 40' (yellow card) 59'		Bunn 11'; Lynch (yellow card) 25'; Carayol (yellow card) 27'; Huws 34'; Steer (yellow card) 68'; Smith (yellow card) 90+6'	Stadium: The Valley; Attendance: 13,873; Referee: Charles Breakspear

19 September 2015 8	Huddersfield Town	4–1	Bolton Wanderers	Huddersfield
15:00 BST	Huws 45+1', 74'; Carayol 51'; Lynch 83'		Feeney 3'; Derik (yellow card) 55' (yellow-red card) 89'; Danns (yellow card) 79'; Davies (yellow card) 83'	Stadium: John Smith's Stadium; Attendance: 11,762; Referee: Trevor Kettle

24 September 2015 9	Huddersfield Town	1–1	Nottingham Forest	Huddersfield
19:45 BST	Cranie (yellow card) 28'; Huws 84'		Lichaj (yellow card) 12'; Mendes 23'	Stadium: John Smith's Stadium; Attendance: 11,299; Referee: Graham Salisbury

3 October 2015 10	Wolverhampton Wanderers	3–0	Huddersfield Town	Wolverhampton
12:30 BST	McDonald 23'; Ojo (yellow card) 30'; Afobe 66', 88'; Le Fondre (yellow card) 68'; Price (yellow card) 70'		Cranie (yellow card) 20'; Whitehead (yellow card) 90+3'	Stadium: Molineux Stadium; Attendance: 18,166; Referee: Chris Kavanagh

17 October 2015 11	Ipswich Town	0–0	Huddersfield Town	Ipswich
15:00 BST	Chambers (yellow card) 21'; Smith (yellow card) 58'; Douglas (yellow card) 62'		Whitehead (yellow card) 37'; Vaughan (red card) 90+3'	Stadium: Portman Road; Attendance: 17,937; Referee: Andy Davies

20 October 2015 12	Huddersfield Town	2–0	Milton Keynes Dons	Huddersfield
19:45 BST	Scannell (yellow card) 33'; Cranie (yellow card) 36'; Wells 58'; Lynch (yellow card) 71'; Whitehead (yellow card) 81'; Paterson 90+5'		Kay (yellow card) 3'; Forster-Caskey (yellow card) 70'	Stadium: John Smith's Stadium; Attendance: 11,471; Referee: Peter Bankes

24 October 2015 13	Huddersfield Town	1–2	Derby County	Huddersfield
15:00 BST	Bunn 31'; Davidson (yellow card) 46'; Lynch (yellow card) 67'		Martin 15'; Thorne 48'	Stadium: John Smith's Stadium; Attendance: 15,371; Referee: Tony Harrington

31 October 2015 14	Burnley	2–1	Huddersfield Town	Burnley
15:00 GMT	Gray 12' (pen.), 43'; Barton (yellow card) 82'		Whitehead (yellow card) 57'; Bunn (yellow card) 71'; Duff 88' (o.g.)	Stadium: Turf Moor; Attendance: 16,749; Referee: Oliver Langford

3 November 2015 15	Reading	2–2	Huddersfield Town	Reading
20:00 GMT	Norwood 15'; Blackman (yellow card) 77'; John 84'		Paterson 2'; Wells 26'; Dempsey (yellow card) 67'; Lynch (yellow card) 77'; Bunn (yellow card) 77'	Stadium: Madejski Stadium; Attendance: 14,379; Referee: Brendan Malone

7 November 2015 16	Huddersfield Town	0–3	Leeds United	Huddersfield
12:30 GMT	Cranie (yellow card) 25'		Wootton (yellow card) 22'; Antenucci 45+5' (yellow card) 45+6'; Wood 45+7'; Mowatt 54'	Stadium: John Smith's Stadium; Attendance: 17,118; Referee: Graham Scott

21 November 2015 17	Sheffield Wednesday	3–1	Huddersfield Town	Sheffield
15:00 GMT	Hélan (yellow card) 30'; Pudil (yellow card) 59'; João 77', 90+3'; Lee 83'		Bunn (yellow card) 27'; Whitehead (yellow card) 38'; Scannell 53'; Dempsey (yellow card) 81'	Stadium: Hillsborough Stadium; Attendance: 21,191; Referee: Carl Boyeson

28 November 2015 18	Huddersfield Town	0–2	Middlesbrough	Huddersfield
15:00 GMT	Whitehead (yellow card) 18'; Hudson (yellow card) 52'; Smith (yellow card) 54'		Clayton 9'; Gibson (yellow card) 59'; Nsue 84'	Stadium: John Smith's Stadium; Attendance: 15,434; Referee: Eddie Ilderton

5 December 2015 19	Birmingham City	0–2	Huddersfield Town	Birmingham
15:00 GMT	Kieftenbeld (yellow card) 35'		Lolley 1'; Hudson (yellow card) 32'; Carayol (yellow card) 74'; Wells 81'	Stadium: St Andrew's; Attendance: 15,931; Referee: Stephen Martin

12 December 2015 20	Huddersfield Town	1–2	Bristol City	Huddersfield
15:00 GMT	Dempsey (yellow card) 64'; Bunn 84'		Kodjia 7'; Flint 29'; Agard (yellow card) 83'; Bryan (yellow card) 89'	Stadium: John Smith's Stadium; Attendance: 13,255; Referee: Jeremy Simpson

15 December 2015 21	Huddersfield Town	2–0	Rotherham United	Huddersfield
19:45 GMT	Carayol 31'; Lynch (yellow card) 58'; Miller 73'		Mattock (yellow card) 67'	Stadium: John Smith's Stadium; Attendance: 12,763; Referee: Mark Brown

19 December 2015 22	Brentford	4–2	Huddersfield Town	Brentford
15:00 GMT	Canós 5'; Vibe 21'; Diagouraga (yellow card) 26'; Judge 31', 55' (pen.)		Hudson (yellow card) 30'; Lolley 46'; Wells (yellow card) 65'; Dempsey 90+2'	Stadium: Griffin Park; Attendance: 10,262; Referee: Phil Gibbs

26 December 2015 23	Huddersfield Town	3–1	Preston North End	Huddersfield
15:00 GMT	Huws (yellow card) 8' (goal) 76'; Smith (yellow card) 25'; Wells 38', 55'; Hogg (yellow card) 65'; Lynch (yellow card) 65'		Huntington (yellow card) 43'; Gallagher (yellow card) 52'; Garner (yellow card) 65'; Reach 90+4'	Stadium: John Smith's Stadium; Attendance: 14,697; Referee: Christopher Kavanagh

28 December 2015 24	Queens Park Rangers	1–1	Huddersfield Town	Shepherd's Bush
15:00 GMT	Polter 80'		Hudson (yellow card) 77'; Wells 86'; Huws (yellow card) 90'	Stadium: Loftus Road; Attendance: 16,662; Referee: Brendan Malone

2 January 2016 25	Bolton Wanderers	0–2	Huddersfield Town	Horwich
15:00 GMT	Pratley (yellow card) 37'; Vela (yellow card) 74'		Lolley 61'; Hudson (yellow card) 81'; Carayol 87'	Stadium: Macron Stadium; Attendance: 15,969; Referee: Andy Haines

12 January 2016 26	Huddersfield Town	5–0	Charlton Athletic	Huddersfield
19:45 GMT	Hudson 17'; Wells 44'; Paterson 75'; Holmes 79'; Davidson 90+2'		Solly (yellow card) 23'; Williams (yellow card) 30'; Fox (yellow card) 53'; Ghoochannejhad (yellow card) 86' (yellow-red card) 87'	Stadium: John Smith's Stadium; Attendance: 9,736; Referee: Geoff Eltringham

16 January 2016 27	Huddersfield Town	1–1	Fulham	Huddersfield
15:00 GMT	Hudson 19' (yellow card) 32'; Bunn (yellow card) 68'		McCormack 2'; Garbutt (yellow card) 68'	Stadium: John Smith's Stadium; Attendance: 12,039; Referee: Chris Sarginson

23 January 2016 28	Brighton & Hove Albion	2–1	Huddersfield Town	Falmer
15:00 GMT	Kayal (yellow card) 25'; Zamora 30'; Wilson 66'		Hudson (yellow card) 2'; Bunn 45+2'; Lynch (yellow card) 57'; Cranie (yellow card) 66'; Smith (yellow card) 73' (yellow-red card) 84'	Stadium: Falmer Stadium; Attendance: 25,367; Referee: Graham Horwood

30 January 2016 29	Huddersfield Town	2–3	Cardiff City	Huddersfield
15:00 GMT	Wells 40' (yellow card) 76'; Lynch (yellow card) 52'; Bunn 90+2'		Whittingham 37', 79'; O'Keefe (yellow card) 55'; Immers 61'; Fábio (yellow card) 73'; Gunnarsson (yellow card) 89'	Stadium: John Smith's Stadium; Attendance: 11,002; Referee: David Webb

6 February 2016 30	Preston North End	2–1	Huddersfield Town	Preston
15:00 GMT	Lynch 83' (o.g.); Browne 90+1'		Hogg (yellow card) 78'; Wells 80'; Matmour (yellow card) 81'	Stadium: Deepdale; Attendance: 12,653; Referee: Darren Drysdale

13 February 2016 31	Nottingham Forest	0–2	Huddersfield Town	West Bridgford
15:00 GMT	Grant (yellow card) 69'; Mills (yellow card) 82'		Mills 14' (o.g.); Hogg (yellow card) 72'; Smith (yellow card) 73'; Billing 84'	Stadium: City Ground; Attendance: 19,984; Referee: Darren Deadman

20 February 2016 32	Huddersfield Town	1–0	Wolverhampton Wanderers	Huddersfield
15:00 GMT	Smith (yellow card) 44'; Husband (yellow card) 45+2'; Wells 78'		van La Parra (yellow card) 45+2'; Saville (yellow card) 71'	Stadium: John Smith's Stadium; Attendance: 12,714; Referee: Kevin Wright

23 February 2016 33	Milton Keynes Dons	1–1	Huddersfield Town	Denbigh
19:45 GMT	Revell 28'; McFadzean (yellow card) 90+2'		Hogg (yellow card) 34'; Wells (yellow card) 43' (goal) 86'; Billing (red card) 49'	Stadium: Stadium mk Attendance: 9,402; Referee: Michael Bull

27 February 2016 34	Huddersfield Town	0–1	Ipswich Town	Huddersfield
15:00 GMT	Smith (yellow card) 74'		Pringle 19'; Chambers (yellow card) 51'; Sears (yellow card) 71'; Maitland-Niles (yellow card) 90'	Stadium: John Smith's Stadium; Attendance: 12,644; Referee: Darren Bond

5 March 2016 35	Derby County	2–0	Huddersfield Town	Derby
15:00 GMT	Martin 31'; Hanson (yellow card) 59'; Russell 73'		Whitehead (yellow card) 36'; Hudson (yellow card) 90+1'	Stadium: iPro Stadium; Attendance: 29,698; Referee: Eddie Ilderton

8 March 2016 36	Huddersfield Town	3–1	Reading	Huddersfield
19:45 GMT	Wells 51'; Paterson 61'; Husband (yellow card) 77'; Bojaj 87'		Piazon (yellow card) 30'; Taylor (yellow card) 89'; John 90+3'	Stadium: John Smith's Stadium; Attendance: 10,167; Referee: Paul Tierney

12 March 2016 37	Huddersfield Town	1–3	Burnley	Huddersfield
15:00 GMT	Lolley 44'		Ward 14'; Vokes 30'; Mee 45+2'	Stadium: John Smith's Stadium; Attendance: 13,917; Referee: Scott Duncan

19 March 2016 38	Leeds United	1–4	Huddersfield Town	Leeds
15:00 GMT	Murphy (yellow card) 20'; Dallas 22' (yellow card) 22'; Bellusci (yellow card) 62'; Taylor (yellow card) 67'; Mowatt (yellow card) 90+1'; Cook (yellow card) 90+3'		Billing (yellow card) 16'; Lolley (yellow card) 18'; Hudson 41'; Bunn 69'; Matmour 73'; Wells 77'	Stadium: Elland Road; Attendance: 29,311; Referee: Graham Scott

2 April 2016 39	Huddersfield Town	0–1	Sheffield Wednesday	Huddersfield
15:00 BST	Hudson (yellow card) 44'		Loovens (yellow card) 32'; Forestieri 83'	Stadium: John Smith's Stadium; Attendance: 15,469; Referee: Iain Williamson

5 April 2016 40	Middlesbrough	3–0	Huddersfield Town	Middlesbrough
19:45 BST	Leadbitter 32' (pen.); Ramírez 33', 77'		Wells (yellow card) 27'	Stadium: Riverside Stadium; Attendance: 24,669; Referee: Stephen Martin

9 April 2016 41	Huddersfield Town	2–2	Hull City	Huddersfield
15:00 BST	Whitehead (yellow card) 12'; Paterson 40'; Huws (yellow card) 89'; Maguire 90' (o.g.)		Livermore (yellow card) 26'; Maguire (yellow card) 61'; Hernández 76'; Diomande 90+3'	Stadium: John Smith's Stadium; Attendance: 12,883; Referee: Darren Deadman

16 April 2016 42	Blackburn Rovers	0–2	Huddersfield Town	Blackburn
15:00 BST	Hanley (yellow card) 61'; Lenihan (yellow card) 73'; Duffy (yellow card) 80'		Wells 35'; Kilgallon 54' (o.g.)	Stadium: Ewood Park; Attendance: 15,061; Referee: Carl Boyeson

19 April 2016 43	Rotherham United	1–1	Huddersfield Town	Rotherham
19:45 BST	Halford 10'		Wells 22'	Stadium: New York Stadium; Attendance: 10,292; Referee: Graham Salisbury

23 April 2016 44	Huddersfield Town	1–1	Birmingham City	Huddersfield
15:00 BST	Paterson (yellow card) 26'; Whitehead (yellow card) 38'; Lynch 82'		Lafferty (yellow card) 48'; Davis (yellow card) 49'; Cotterill 73' (yellow card) 74'	Stadium: John Smith's Stadium; Attendance: 13,054; Referee: David Webb

30 April 2016 45	Bristol City	4–0	Huddersfield Town	Bristol
15:00 BST	Kodjia 45', 67'; Bryan 64'; Tomlin 77'		Hudson (yellow card) 49'; Lynch (yellow card) 52'; Davidson (yellow card) 86'	Stadium: Ashton Gate Stadium; Attendance: 15,791; Referee: Fred Graham

7 May 2016 46	Huddersfield Town	1–5	Brentford	Huddersfield
12:30 BST	Paterson 50'; Whitehead (yellow card) 82'		Canós 1'; Woods (yellow card) 7'; Dean (yellow card) 12'; Hogan 52', 62'; Vibe 67'; Yennaris (yellow card) 82'; Swift 88'	Stadium: John Smith's Stadium; Attendance: 13,397; Referee: Dean Whitestone

==== Score overview ====
Win Draw Loss

Opposition	Home score	Away score	Double
Birmingham City	1–1	2–0	No
Blackburn Rovers	0–0	2–0	No
Bolton Wanderers	4–1	2–0	Yes
Brentford	1–5	2–4	No
Brighton & Hove Albion	1–1	1–2	No
Bristol City	1–2	0–4	No
Burnley	1–3	1–2	No
Cardiff City	2–3	0–2	No
Charlton Athletic	5–0	2–1	Yes
Derby County	1–2	0–2	No
Fulham	1–1	1–1	No
Hull City	2–2	0–2	No
Ipswich Town	0–1	0–0	No
Leeds United	0–3	4–1	No
Middlesbrough	0–2	0–3	No
Milton Keynes Dons	2–0	1–1	No
Nottingham Forest	1–1	2–0	No
Preston North End	3–1	1–2	No
Queens Park Rangers	0–1	1–1	No
Reading	3–1	2–2	No
Rotherham United	2–0	1–1	No
Sheffield Wednesday	0–1	1–3	No
Wolverhampton Wanderers	1–0	0–3	No

Note: Huddersfield goals are listed first.

=== FA Cup ===
On 7 December 2015, the third round draw was made, Huddersfield Town were drawn at home against Reading, in a repeat of the third round tie the previous season.

9 January 2016 Round 3	Huddersfield Town	2–2	Reading	Huddersfield
15:00 GMT	Hogg (yellow card) 45+4'; Paterson 57'; Wells (yellow card) 68' (goal) 90+2' (pen.)		McCleary (yellow card) 45+1'; Vydra 71'; Robson-Kanu 87'	Stadium: John Smith's Stadium; Attendance: 9,236; Referee: Jeremy Simpson

19 January 2016 Round 3 Replay	Reading	5–2	Huddersfield Town	Reading
20:00 GMT	Piazon 29'; Vydra 57', 61', 90'; Fernández 90+3'		Paterson 8'; Smith 15'; Hogg (red card) 27'	Stadium: Madejski Stadium; Attendance: 8,119; Referee: Oliver Langford

=== League Cup ===
On 16 June 2015, the first round draw was made, Huddersfield Town were drawn at home against Notts County.

11 August 2015 Round 1	Huddersfield Town	1–2	Notts County	Huddersfield
19:45 BST	Wallace 35' (yellow card) 66'; Bunn (yellow card) 39'		Aborah (yellow card) 31'; Noble 42', 56'; Jenner (yellow card) 45+1'; Swerts (yellow card) 66' (yellow-red card) 70'	Stadium: John Smith's Stadium; Attendance: 4,238; Referee: Jeremy Simpson
