= Harry Bunn =

English footballer

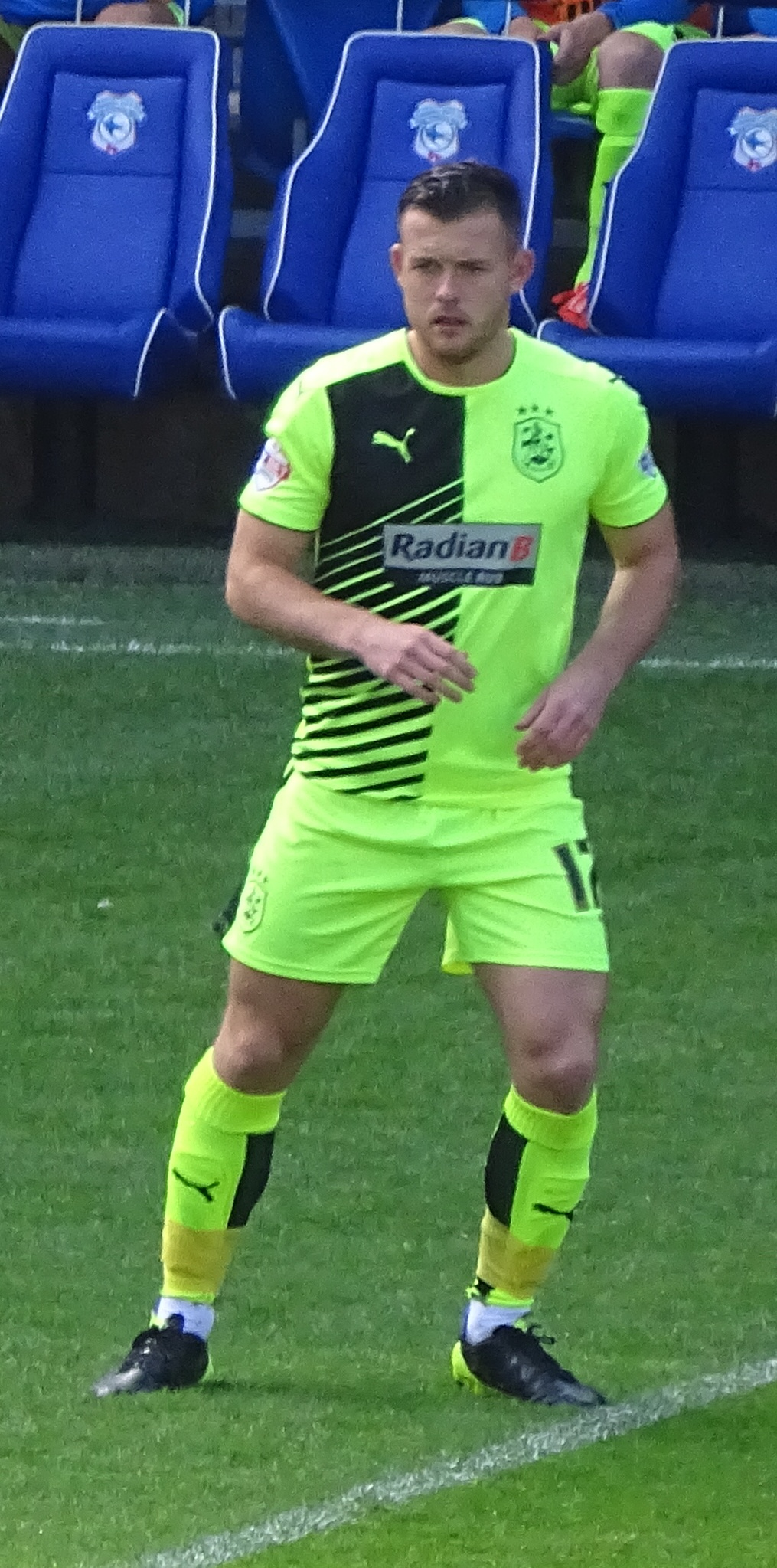
- Bunn playing for Huddersfield Town in 2015

Personal information
- Full name: Harry Charles Bunn
- Date of birth: 21 November 1992 (age 33)
- Place of birth: Oldham, England
- Height: 5 ft 9 in (1.75 m)
- Position: Midfielder

Team information
- Current team: Hyde United

Youth career
- 2001–2011: Manchester City

Senior career*
Years	Team	Apps	(Gls)
2011–2014	Manchester City	0	(0)
2011	→ Rochdale (loan)	6	(0)
2012	→ Preston North End (loan)	1	(1)
2012	→ Oldham Athletic (loan)	11	(0)
2012	→ Crewe Alexandra (loan)	4	(0)
2013	→ Sheffield United (loan)	2	(0)
2013–2014	→ Huddersfield Town (loan)	0	(0)
2014–2017	Huddersfield Town	91	(15)
2017–2019	Bury	38	(3)
2018–2019	→ Southend United (loan)	24	(4)
2020	Kilmarnock	3	(0)
2020–2021	York City	12	(3)
2021–2022	Scunthorpe United	20	(2)
2022–2023	Buxton	24	(0)
2023	Ashton United	11	(1)
2023–2025	Hyde United	53	(9)
- * Club domestic league appearances and goals as of 16:26, 11 February 2025 (UTC)

Harry Charles Bunn (born 21 November 1992) is an English professional footballer, who plays for Hyde United.

Born in Oldham, Bunn began his career with Manchester City and transferred to Huddersfield Town in 2014. He was with Huddersfield for three seasons and then transferred to Bury ahead of the 2017–18 season. He has also spent time on loan at Rochdale, Preston North End, Oldham Athletic, Crewe Alexandra, York City and Sheffield United.

== Career ==
=== Manchester City ===
Bunn joined the Manchester City Academy in 2001 when he was nine. He scored 20 goals playing for both of City's Under-18 and Under-21 teams during the season, leading him to be named the academy scholar of the year at the end of the season. While at the academy, Bunn played under the coach Steve Eyre, who later signed him at Rochdale.

In June 2011, Bunn was promoted to the club's elite development squad ahead of the new season. The following year, Bunn had an opportunity in the first team when he was featured in the club's pre–season campaign. By the time he left Manchester City, Bunn failed to make a breakthrough at the first team.

=== Loan spells ===
Bunn went on loan to League One side Rochdale until December 2011. He made his debut on 5 November 2011, coming off the bench in a 3–1 away loss against Milton Keynes Dons. Three days later, on his first start for Rochdale in the Football League Trophy quarter-final game against local rivals Preston North End, Bunn got on the score sheet, scoring the home side's equaliser in the 1–1 drawn tie which Rochdale eventually lost on penalties.

Shortly after ending his loan spell at Rochdale, Bunn joined Preston North End on loan until the end of the season. He scored on his Preston North End debut, starting the match and played for 64 minutes before being substituted, in a 3–2 win against Wycombe Wanderers on 13 January 2008. This, however, turns out to be his only appearance for the club, as he was recalled early by his parent club.

On 16 March 2012, Bunn joined Oldham Athletic on loan until the end of the season. He made his Oldham Athletic debut on 17 March 2012, where he started and played for 67 minutes before being substituted, in a 3–2 loss against Rochdale, the team he played earlier this season. Bunn went on to make 11 appearances for the club during his loan spell.

On 21 August 2012, Bunn joined Crewe Alexandra on loan for the first half of the season, making his debut as a second-half substitute in a 1–2 away win at Scunthorpe United that evening. Bunn went on to make four appearances before "landing awkwardly", resulting injuring knee ligament, during a 0–0 draw against Tranmere Rovers on 8 September 2012. As a result, Bunn's loan spell at Crewe Alexandra was cut short.

On 2 September 2013, Bunn joined Sheffield United on an initial one-month loan deal. He made his Sheffield United debut five days later, where he came on as a second–half substitute, in a 3–1 loss against Rotherham United. After making two appearances for United, Bunn's loan was extended for a further two months, but he failed to play for the first team again during that period.

=== Huddersfield Town ===
On returning to Manchester City, Bunn was immediately loaned out again, this time to Huddersfield Town. Despite failing to make a first team appearance whilst on loan at the Terriers, Bunn signed a short-term deal with Huddersfield Town after he was released by Manchester City in January 2014.

He made his début for the Terriers as a late substitute in the 4–2 loss against Blackburn Rovers at the John Smith's Stadium on 15 March 2014. Despite being on the substitute for the rest of the season, Bunn was featured in the club's reserve nevertheless. Following the expiry of his short-term deal, he signed a new 12-month contract at the Terriers on 30 June 2014.

In the 2014–15 season, Bunn featured in the first team under then caretaker manager Mark Lillis at the start of the season. Bunn scored the winner on his full début for the club in a 2–1 win over Reading at the Madejski Stadium on 19 August 2014. Eleven days later, on 30 August 2014, he scored again, in a 4–2 loss against Watford. A month later, against Millwall on 27 September 2014, Bunn played a vital role when he set up two goals for Nahki Wells, helping the side win 2–1. This was followed up by scoring, in a 3–1 win over Wolverhampton Wanderers four days later. Bunn later scored twice several weeks on 18 October 2014, in a 4–2 win over Blackpool. He then established himself at the Huddersfield Town's first team, playing in the primarily in a left-sided role. On 4 November 2014, Bunn signed a three–year contract with the club, keeping him until 2017. Later in the same day, he scored again despite losing 3–2 to Derby County. After returning to the first team from injuries on two occasions during the season at some points in mid–December and January, Bunn then scored again on 31 January 2015, in a 2–1 loss against Leeds United. However, Bunn soon was out of the first team later in the season, due to injuries. Even returning to the team, Bunn remained on the substitute bench for the rest of the season. Despite this, Bunn finished his first permanent season at the club, making 32 appearances and scoring 9 times in all competitions. At the end of the 2014–15 season, Bunn was named the club's Young Player of the Year.

In the 2015–16 season, Bunn continued to be in the first team regular for the side and his performance have been praised by Manager Chris Powell at the start of the season. He then scored his first goal for the club, in a 2–1 win over Charlton Athletic on 15 September 2015. A month later against Derby County on 24 October 2015, Bunn scored again, in a 2–1 loss. On After serving a suspension in November, Bunn scored on his return, in a 2–1 loss against Bristol City on 11 December 2015. Shortly after the match, he signed a contract extension with the club, keeping him until 2019. He then scored two goals in two games between 23 January 2016 and 30 January 2016 against Brighton & Hove Albion and Cardiff City. Although he scored 6 goals in 44 appearances in all competitions, Bunn played a role at the club when he "develop his game and now plays an increasingly important role in creating chances for others rather than always seeking to score himself."

In the 2016–17 season, Bunn missed the start of the season, due to a hamstring injury sustained in the pre–season tour. Although he returned to the first team from injury, Bunn found himself in the club's rotation squad and played a part–time role under the management of David Wagner in the 2016–17 season. Bunn then scored his first goal of the season, as well as, setting up one of the goals, in a 4–0 win over Port Vale in the third round of the FA Cup. On 1 March 2017 Bunn opened the scoring against his former club Manchester City, which Huddersfield eventually lost 5–1. However, as the 2016–17 season progressed, Bunn's first team opportunities was limited, due to competitions and his own injury concern. At the end of the 2016–17 season, Bunn went on to make 19 appearances and scoring two times in all competitions.

=== Bury ===
Having been linked with a move away from Huddersfield Town, Bunn joined League One side Bury, signing a three–year contract on 4 August 2017. Upon joining the club, he said he had been motivated by the opportunity to play regular first team football. He made his debut for Bury in a 1–0 loss to Sunderland in the first round of the League Cup on 10 August 2017.

On 28 August 2018, Bunn joined League One Southend United on a season long loan.

Bunn was left without a club after Bury went out of business in August 2019.

=== Kilmarnock ===
On 15 January 2020, Bunn joined Scottish Premiership side Kilmarnock on a contract until the end of the 2019–20 season. He left the club at the end of the season.

=== York City ===
On 14 August 2020, Bunn joined National League North side York City.

=== Scunthorpe United ===
On 23 July 2021 Bunn signed for Scunthorpe United on a one-year contract.

=== Non-League ===
Harry Bunn was transferred to Buxton. He had a contract until 30 June 2023 signed on 6 August 2022. After leaving Buxton he joined Hyde United.

== Personal life ==
Bunn is the son of former Hull City and Oldham Athletic striker Frankie Bunn, who managed Oldham Athletic during the 2018–19 season. Bunn has an older brother, who is also a footballer, playing in amateur football.

== Career statistics ==
As of match played 8 February 2025

Appearances and goals by club, season and competition
Club	Season	League			FA Cup		League Cup		Other		Total	
Club	Season	Division	Apps	Goals	Apps	Goals	Apps	Goals	Apps	Goals	Apps	Goals
Manchester City	2011–12	Premier League	0	0	0	0	0	0	0	0	0	0
Manchester City	2012–13	Premier League	0	0	0	0	0	0	0	0	0	0
Manchester City	2013–14	Premier League	0	0	0	0	0	0	0	0	0	0
Manchester City	Total		0	0	0	0	0	0	0	0	0	0
Rochdale (loan)	2011–12	League One	6	0	1	0	0	0	1 (Note: Appearances in EFL Trophy.)	1	8	1
Preston North End (loan)	2011–12	League One	1	1	0	0	0	0	0	0	1	1
Oldham Athletic (loan)	2011–12	League One	11	0	0	0	0	0	0	0	11	0
Crewe Alexandra (loan)	2012–13	League One	4	0	0	0	1	0	0	0	5	0
Sheffield United (loan)	2013–14	League One	2	0	0	0	0	0	0	0	2	0
Huddersfield Town	2013–14	Championship	3	0	0	0	0	0	0	0	3	0
Huddersfield Town	2014–15	Championship	30	9	1	0	1	0	0	0	32	9
Huddersfield Town	2015–16	Championship	42	6	1	0	1	0	0	0	44	6
Huddersfield Town	2016–17	Championship	16	0	3	2	0	0	0	0	19	2
Huddersfield Town	Total		115	16	6	2	3	0	1	1	125	19
Bury	2017–18	League One	37	3	0	0	1	0	3	2	41	5
Bury	2018–19	League Two	1	0	0	0	1	0	0	0	2	0
Bury	Total		38	3	0	0	2	0	3	2	43	5
Southend United (loan)	2018–19	League One	24	4	3	1	0	0	3	1	30	6
Kilmarnock	2019–20	Scottish Premiership	3	0	0	0	0	0	0	0	3	0
York City	2020–21	National League North	12	3	0	0	0	0	0	0	12	3
Scunthorpe United	2021–22	League Two	20	1	1	0	0	0	1	0	22	1
Buxton	2022–23	National League North	24	0	4	0	—		1 (Note: Appearance(s) in FA Trophy)	0	29	0
Ashton United	2022–23	Northern Premier League Premier Division	11	1	0	0	—		0	0	11	1
Hyde United	2023–24	Northern Premier League Premier Division	34	8	2	0	—		5 (Note: Two appearances in FA Trophy, one appearance in Manchester Premier Cup, two appearances in Cheshire Senior Cup)	0	41	8
Hyde United	2024–25	Northern Premier League Premier Division	19	1	2	0	—		2 (Note: One appearance in Manchester Premier Cup, one appearance in Cheshire Snior Cup)	0	23	1
Hyde United	Total		53	9	4	0	0	0	7	0	64	9
Avro	2024–25	Northern Premier League Division One West	1	1	0	0	—		0	0	1	1
Career total			301	38	18	3	5	0	16	4	340	45
