= Jacob Butterfield =

English footballer (born 1990)

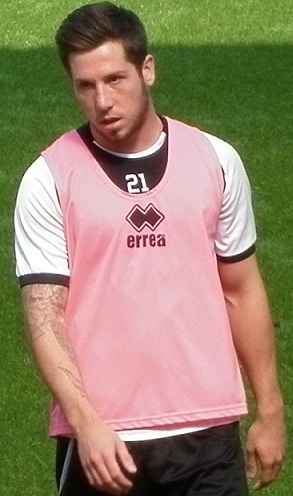
- Butterfield in 2012

Personal information
- Full name: Jacob Luke Butterfield
- Date of birth: 10 June 1990 (age 36)
- Place of birth: Bradford, England
- Height: 1.80 m (5 ft 11 in)
- Position: Midfielder

Team information
- Current team: Scunthorpe United (player-coach)
- Number: 23

Youth career
- Bradford City
- –2005: Manchester United
- 2005–2007: Barnsley

Senior career*
Years	Team	Apps	(Gls)
2007–2012	Barnsley	89	(8)
2012–2013	Norwich City	0	(0)
2012–2013	→ Bolton Wanderers (loan)	8	(0)
2013	→ Crystal Palace (loan)	9	(0)
2013–2014	Middlesbrough	31	(3)
2014–2015	Huddersfield Town	50	(7)
2015–2019	Derby County	80	(8)
2017–2018	→ Sheffield Wednesday (loan)	20	(0)
2019	→ Bradford City (loan)	15	(1)
2019–2020	Luton Town	15	(1)
2020–2021	Melbourne Victory	26	(3)
2021–2022	St Johnstone	19	(1)
2022–2024	Scunthorpe United	49	(12)
2024–2026	Gateshead	47	(5)
2026–	Scunthorpe United	0	(0)

Managerial career
- 2026: Scunthorpe United (interim)
- * Club domestic league appearances and goals as of 18:05, 13 May 2026 (UTC)

Jacob Luke Butterfield (born 10 June 1990) is an English professional footballer who plays as a midfielder for National League club Scunthorpe United, where he holds the role of player-coach.

Butterfield came through the youth academy at Barnsley and went on to establish himself as a first team player over a five-year spell between 2007 and 2012. He moved to Premier League side Norwich City but failed to make a league appearance and spent time on loan with Bolton Wanderers and Crystal Palace before signing permanently for Middlesbrough. He has since played for Huddersfield Town, Derby County, Sheffield Wednesday, Bradford City and Luton Town. Between 2020 and 2022 he played outside of English football firstly with A-League side Melbourne Victory before a stint in the Scottish Premiership with St Johnstone.

== Club career ==
=== Early career ===
Born in Bradford, Butterfield spent a brief spell with the youth team of hometown club Bradford City at the age of 7 or 8, before joining the Manchester United Academy.

=== Barnsley ===
Butterfield was described as a star of the future by manager at the time, Simon Davey. He had worked with Butterfield in the Barnsley academy before being appointed as manager in 2006. He made his debut for Barnsley in a League Cup tie against Newcastle United in August 2007 coming on as a substitute for Martin Devaney during a 2–0 loss. Butterfield also made a substitute appearance in Barnsley's 2008 FA Cup semi-final against Cardiff City.

Butterfield scored his first senior goal on 8 August 2009 with a 59th-minute goal at Hillsborough against local rivals Sheffield Wednesday. This goal proved to be vital as it spurred Barnsley on to claw back to 2–2 as Barnsley were 2–0 down at half time. He also made an appearance coming on as a substitute versus former club Manchester United in a League Cup tie in which Barnsley suffered a 2–0 defeat.

On 17 September 2011, he captained Barnsley for the first time. It was in their 1–1 draw at home to Watford. Many believed at the time that Butterfield, at just 21 years of age, had become Barnsley's youngest ever captain. But, in fact, Eric Winstanley had captained the Reds at aged 19 in the 1960s. Butterfield was having an exceptional season and Premier League scouts were regularly in attendance at Oakwell. He was soon rewarded for his efforts with a call up to the England under 21 squad.

Butterfield missed the rest of the 2011–12 season through injury following a shocking 'tackle' in the New Year's Eve derby encounter with Leeds United bringing his "amazing" form to an end. Scans taken after the match showed it to be torn anterior cruciate ligaments. He finished the season – albeit prematurely – with five goals to his name and a growing reputation in The Championship, described by his manager Keith Hill as the best midfielder in the league.

=== Norwich City ===
On 3 July 2012, Butterfield signed for Norwich City on a four-year contract. Butterfield was out of contract, but Barnsley were entitled to compensation, due to his age. He made his debut for the club on 26 September in a 1–0 win over Doncaster Rovers in the Football League Cup. However, he failed to gain a first team place at the club, with his only other first team appearance being another League Cup game against Tottenham Hotspur, and spent most of his time with Norwich out on loan.

On 8 November, Butterfield joined Bolton Wanderers on loan for a month, this becoming Dougie Freedman's first signing since taking over at the Reebok Stadium. He made his debut on 17 November, in a 1–1 draw at home against his former club Barnsley. The loan was extended outside the Window by another month on 1 December. Butterfield left Bolton and went back to Norwich City on 3 January 2013.

On 16 January 2013, it was announced that Butterfield had signed on loan for Crystal Palace, where he was given the squad number six. He made his début on 19 January, where he was part of the starting eleven, in a goalless draw with Bolton Wanderers. His last appearance for Crystal Palace was on 5 March, when he started in the 4–2 victory over Hull City. He returned to Norwich before the end of that month.

=== Middlesbrough ===
On 2 September 2013, Butterfield signed a three-year contract, with a one-year option to extend, at Middlesbrough for an undisclosed fee. He made his debut in a 3–1 defeat at Ipswich Town on 14 September 2013. He scored his first goal for the club in a 4–1 win over Yeovil Town on 5 October 2013. He would go on to score a goal that was controversially disallowed at Hillsborough against Sheffield Wednesday. He scored one of the goals of the season for the Boro against Birmingham City and followed that up with the winning goal at eventual runners up, Burnley a week later to end the campaign in good form. He was also part of the Boro side whose victory on 26 April 2014 relegated his former club, Barnsley to the third tier of English football.

=== Huddersfield Town ===
On 13 August 2014, Butterfield joined Huddersfield Town and signed a four-year deal, which was part of a swap deal that saw Adam Clayton join Middlesbrough. He made his début for the Terriers in their 3–1 defeat to Cardiff City at the Cardiff City Stadium on 16 August 2014. His first goal for Huddersfield Town came in a 2–1 win against Reading at the Madejski Stadium in the 10th minute on 19 August 2014. His first home goal for the Terriers came in the 4–2 win over Blackpool on 18 October 2014. He repeated that trick just a few days later on 21 October 2014, scoring from close range in the 1–1 draw with Brighton & Hove Albion, prompting new manager Chris Powell to set Butterfield a target of reaching double figures for the season. He scored his fourth for the club in a 2–1 home victory over former club, Bolton Wanderers, a cracking strike from the angle of the box and started 2015 in good form when playing a key role in the club's 3–1 win over high flying Watford, setting up the opening goal for Nahki Wells. He went on to score another two goals, created many more and was voted the club's Player of the Season for the 2014–15 season.

=== Derby County ===
On 1 September 2015, Butterfield joined Derby County for around £5 million on a four-year deal. He scored his first goal for The Rams in a 3–0 win over Rotherham United on 31 October 2015. He scored twice for Derby County away at Hull on his 200th appearance of his Football League career .

Butterfield joined Sheffield Wednesday on loan on 31 August 2017, in a loan swap-deal involving Sam Winnall moving in the other direction from Wednesday to Derby for the duration of the 2017–18 season.

In January 2019 he moved on loan to Bradford City. At Bradford he scored once in a 3–1 win over Peterborough United on 9 March 2019.

=== Luton Town ===
On 30 July 2019, Butterfield joined Luton Town after Derby agreed to mutually terminate his deal. The length of his contract at Luton was not disclosed. He made his debut on 2 August in a 3–3 draw with his former club Middlesbrough, coming on as a 60th minute substitute. He scored his first goal for Luton against Barnsley on 24 August 2019, another former club of his. Butterfield was released at the end of the 2019–20 season.

=== Melbourne Victory ===
On 26 October 2020, Butterfield signed for A-League side Melbourne Victory, joining his former Luton Town teammate Callum McManaman.

=== St Johnstone ===
On 13 December 2021, Butterfield joined Scottish Premiership side St Johnstone until the end of the season. On 22 December 2021, Butterfield scored his first goal for St Johnstone in a 2–1 defeat against Ross County in the Scottish Premiership.

=== Scunthorpe United ===
On 18 July 2022, Butterfield joined National League club Scunthorpe United, reuniting with Keith Hill whom Butterfield played under previously at Barnsley.

In May 2024, Scunthorpe United announced that Butterfield would depart the club upon the expiration of his contract having rejected a new deal.

=== Gateshead ===
On 30 July 2024, Butterfield joined National League side Gateshead on a one-year deal with the option to extend.

In July 2025, he was appointed player-assistant manager.

=== Return to Scunthorpe United ===
On 30 June 2026, Butterfield returned to National League club Scunthorpe United, joining as player-coach having rejected the offer of a new contract with Gateshead.

== International career ==
Butterfield was called up to represent England at under-21 level, though he never made an appearance.

== Career statistics ==
As of end of 2025–26 season

Appearances and goals by club, season and competition
Club	Season	League			National Cup (Note: Includes FA Cup, Scottish Cup)		League Cup (Note: Includes EFL Cup, Scottish League Cup)		Other		Total	
Club	Season	Division	Apps	Goals	Apps	Goals	Apps	Goals	Apps	Goals	Apps	Goals
Barnsley	2007–08	Championship	3	0	1	0	1	0	—		5	0
Barnsley	2008–09	Championship	3	0	1	0	0	0	—		4	0
Barnsley	2009–10	Championship	20	1	1	0	4	0	—		25	1
Barnsley	2010–11	Championship	39	2	1	0	1	0	—		41	2
Barnsley	2011–12	Championship	24	5	0	0	1	0	—		25	5
Barnsley	Total		89	8	4	0	7	0	—		100	8
Norwich City	2012–13	Premier League	0	0	1	0	2	0	—		3	0
Bolton Wanderers (loan)	2012–13	Championship	8	0	—		—		—		8	0
Crystal Palace (loan)	2012–13	Championship	9	0	—		—		—		9	0
Middlesbrough	2013–14	Championship	31	3	1	0	0	0	—		32	3
Huddersfield Town	2014–15	Championship	45	6	0	0	1	0	—		46	6
Huddersfield Town	2015–16	Championship	5	1	0	0	1	0	—		6	1
Huddersfield Town	Total		50	7	0	0	2	0	—		52	7
Derby County	2015–16	Championship	37	7	2	1	0	0	1 (Note: Appearance in the Championship play-offs)	0	40	8
Derby County	2016–17	Championship	40	1	2	0	3	0	—		45	1
Derby County	2017–18	Championship	3	0	0	0	1	0	—		4	0
Derby County	2018–19	Championship	0	0	0	0	0	0	0	0	0	0
Derby County	Total		80	8	4	1	4	0	1	0	89	9
Sheffield Wednesday (loan)	2017–18	Championship	20	0	3	0	—		—		23	0
Bradford City (loan)	2018–19	League One	15	1	0	0	0	0	—		15	1
Luton Town	2019–20	Championship	15	1	1	0	1	0	—		17	1
Luton Town	2020–21	Championship	0	0	0	0	0	0	—		0	0
Luton Town	Total		15	1	1	0	1	0	–		17	1
Melbourne Victory	2020–21	A-League	26	3	—		—		0	0	26	3
St Johnstone	2021–22	Scottish Premiership	19	1	1	0	0	0	1 (Note: Appearance in Scottish Premiership play-offs)	0	18	1
Scunthorpe United	2022–23	National League	42	4	0	0	—		1 (Note: Appearance(s) in the FA Trophy)	0	43	4
Scunthorpe United	2023–24	National League North	7	8	0	0	—		1	1	8	9
Scunthorpe United	Total		49	12	0	0	—		2	1	47	13
Gateshead	2024–25	National League	19	4	0	0	—		1 (Note: Appearance(s) in National League Cup)	0	20	4
Gateshead	2025–26	National League	28	1	1	0	—		3	0	32	1
Gateshead	Total		47	5	1	0	—		4	0	52	5
Career total			404	43	14	1	16	0	7	0	435	51

== Honours ==
Individual

- Huddersfield Town Player of the Year: 2014–15
- Scunthorpe United Player of the Year: 2023–24
- National League North Player of the Month: October 2023
