= Lloyd Allinson =

English footballer

Personal information
- Full name: Lloyd James Allinson
- Date of birth: 7 September 1993 (age 33)
- Place of birth: Rothwell, England
- Height: 6 ft 2 in (1.88 m)
- Position: Goalkeeper

Team information
- Current team: Stocksbridge Park Steels (on loan from Cleethorpes Town)

Youth career
- Rothwell Town
- 2003–2010: Huddersfield Town

Senior career*
Years	Team	Apps	(Gls)
2010–2016	Huddersfield Town	1	(0)
2012	→ Ilkeston (loan)	2	(0)
2013	→ Ilkeston (loan)	13	(0)
2016–2017	Chesterfield	5	(0)
2017–2019	FC United of Manchester	59	(0)
2019	→ Nantwich Town (loan)	5	(0)
2019	Guiseley	1	(0)
2019	Ashton United		
2019–2020	Gainsborough Trinity		
2020	Hyde United	6	(0)
2020–2021	Scarborough Athletic		
2021–2026	Pontefract Collieries		
2026–	Cleethorpes Town		
2026	→ Frickley Athletic (loan)	11	(0)
2026–	→ Stocksbridge Park Steels (loan)		
- * Club domestic league appearances and goals as of 18:49, 13 January 2026 (UTC)

Lloyd James Allinson (born 7 September 1993) is an English professional footballer who plays a goalkeeper for Stocksbridge Park Steels, on loan from Cleethorpes Town.

== Career ==
=== Huddersfield Town ===
Allinson joined Huddersfield Town at under-10 level from Rothwell Town, and made his first appearance on the first-team substitute bench in October 2010. He spent two loan spells at Ilkeston during the 2011–12 and 2013–14 seasons. He was a regular on Huddersfield's first-team bench during the 2014–15 season.

He made his senior début for Huddersfield on 7 May 2016 in their 5–1 home defeat against Brentford. He was released by the club at the end of the 2015–16 season.

=== Chesterfield ===
On 4 August 2016, Allinson signed a six-month contract at Chesterfield after featuring for the club during pre-season. Allinson made his Chesterfield debut on 30 August 2016 in a 2–1 win against Wolverhampton Wanderers U23 in the opening round of the EFL Trophy. On 7 February 2017, Allinson extended his contract with the club until the end of the season. He was released at the end of the season.

=== Non-league ===
In July 2017 he joined FC United of Manchester. He was under contract with the club until May 2019.

In March 2019 he joined Nantwich Town on loan.

On 3 August 2019, Allinson joined Guiseley. After spending time with Ashton United, he signed for Gainsborough Trinity in November 2019.

Allinson signed for Hyde United in January 2020, making eight appearances in all competitions.

In August 2020 he joined Scarborough Athletic.

Allinson left Pontefract Collieries in January 2026 after four-and-a-half years, signing for Cleethorpes Town later that month.

Allinson joined Frickley Athletic on a season-long loan from Cleethorpes Town in July 2026, making his debut in a 1-1 draw with Keighley Town on the opening day of the season. On 9 October, Allinson was recalled from his loan spell by Cleethorpes Town, before completing a loan move to Stocksbridge Park Steels.

== Career statistics ==
As of match played 7 September 2019

Appearances and goals by club, season and competition
Club	Season	League			FA Cup		Other		Total	
Club	Season	Division	Apps	Goals	Apps	Goals	Apps	Goals	Apps	Goals
Huddersfield Town	2010–11	League One	0	0	0	0	0	0	0	0
Huddersfield Town	2011–12	League One	0	0	0	0	0	0	0	0
Huddersfield Town	2012–13	Championship	0	0	0	0	—		0	0
Huddersfield Town	2013–14	Championship	0	0	0	0	—		0	0
Huddersfield Town	2014–15	Championship	0	0	0	0	—		0	0
Huddersfield Town	2015–16	Championship	1	0	0	0	—		1	0
Huddersfield Town	Total		1	0	0	0	0	0	1	0
Ilkeston (loan)	2011–12	Northern Premier League Division One South	2	0	—		2 (Note: Appearance(s) in Northern Premier League Division One South play-offs)	0	4	0
Ilkeston (loan)	2013–14	Northern Premier League Premier Division	13	0	—		2 (Note: One appearance in FA Trophy; one appearance in Northern Premier League Challenge Cup)	0	15	0
Chesterfield	2016–17	League One	5	0	0	0	5 (Note: Appearance(s) in EFL Trophy)	0	10	0
FC United of Manchester	2017–18	National League North	42	0	5	0	4 (Note: Three appearances in Manchester Premier Cup, one appearance in FA Trophy)	0	51	0
FC United of Manchester	2018–19	National League North	17	0	0	0	2 (Note: One appearance in Manchester Premier Cup, one appearance in FA Trophy)	0	19	0
FC United of Manchester	Total		59	0	5	0	6	0	70	0
Nantwich Town (loan)	2018–19	Northern Premier League Premier Division	5	0	—		2 (Note: One appearance in Cheshire Senior Cup, one appearance in Northern Premier League Premier Division play-offs)	0	7	0
Guiseley	2019–20	National League North	1	0	0	0	—		1	0
Career total			86	0	5	0	17	0	108	0
