= Rekorderlig =

Brand of cider by Åbro Bryggeri

Rekorderlig Wild Berries Cider

Rekorderlig (Swedish pronunciation: [rɛkɔˈɖěːɭɪ(g)]) is a brand of cider manufactured by Åbro Bryggeri in Sweden. It was first created in 1996 using spring water from Vimmerby, Kalmar County, Sweden. Rekorderlig is currently available in 15 countries.

== Sponsorship activities ==
Rekorderlig sponsored the 2012 NME Awards Best New Artist award, won by the English indie rock band Florence and the Machine.

Rekorderlig was a major sponsor of the English football club Huddersfield Town A.F.C., with Rekorderlig's logo appearing on the club's home shirts from the beginning of the 2012–13 season until the end of the 2014–15 season. The cider was sold on matchdays at Huddersfield Town's home ground, the John Smith's Stadium. Rekorderlig also maintains an annual pop-up bar called the Rekorderlig Cider Lodge at the winter events at Southbank Centre in London.

Rekorderlig sponsors the National Kubb competition in Hawke's Bay, New Zealand.
