= Liam Coogans =

Scottish footballer (born 1996)

Personal information
- Date of birth: 31 October 1996 (age 30)
- Place of birth: Scotland
- Position: Forward

Senior career*
Years	Team	Apps	(Gls)
2013–2014	Airdrieonians	30	(4)
2014–2016	Huddersfield Town	0	(0)
2015	→ Queen of the South (loan)	3	(0)
2016	Brechin City	5	(1)
2016–2017	Fauldhouse United		
2017	Linlithgow Rose		
2017–2018	East Kilbride	0	(0)
2018–2019	Edusport Academy		
- * Club domestic league appearances and goals as of 21 June 2019

Liam Coogans (born 31 October 1996) is a Scottish footballer who last played for Edusport as a forward.

== Career ==
Coogans began his career at the academy of Airdrie United. He was first included in a senior matchday squad on 9 March 2013, remaining an unused substitute in their 3–3 home draw against Dunfermline Athletic in the Scottish Football League First Division. Two weeks later, he made his professional debut, replacing Ryan Donnelly for the final 16 minutes of a 1–2 defeat to Raith Rovers at the Excelsior Stadium. Coogans made seven appearances in his first season, five as a starter, and scored once, opening a 2–1 win at Dunfermline in the last game of the season on 4 May, a result which confined the opponents to a relegation play-off.

Nonetheless, Airdrieonians were also relegated and played the 2013–14 season in the renamed Scottish League One. He scored three goals in 23 games over the campaign, again finding the net in the last game of the season: on as a substitute, he finished a corner kick to conclude a 2–0 win over Arbroath which sent the visitors to Scottish League Two.

Coogans had training sessions at Scottish Premiership club Celtic, and Blackburn Rovers and Huddersfield Town of England's Football League Championship, spending time at the latter in January 2014. On 13 August of that year, he signed for Huddersfield on a two-year contract, aged 17. He was put in the Terriers' Development Squad, and on 2 September 2015 returned north of the border, joining Scottish Championship club Queen of the South on loan until 4 January 2016. After leaving Huddersfield in February 2016, Coogans began a trial with Scottish League One side Dunfermline Athletic, appearing in two matches for their development side, before signing for Brechin City.
