= Nahki Wells =

Bermudian footballer (born 1990)

- Wells in 2026

Personal information
- Full name: Nahki Michael Wells
- Date of birth: 1 June 1990 (age 36)
- Place of birth: Hamilton, Bermuda
- Height: 1.70 m (5 ft 7 in)
- Position: Forward

Team information
- Current team: Luton Town
- Number: 21

Youth career
- 2002–2009: Dandy Town Hornets

Senior career*
Years	Team	Apps	(Gls)
2009–2010	Dandy Town Hornets		(20)
2010	Bermuda Hogges	9	(2)
2010–2011	Eccleshill United		
2011	Carlisle United	3	(0)
2011–2014	Bradford City	91	(42)
2014	→ Huddersfield Town (loan)	1	(1)
2014–2017	Huddersfield Town	143	(44)
2017–2020	Burnley	9	(0)
2018–2019	→ Queens Park Rangers (loan)	40	(7)
2019–2020	→ Queens Park Rangers (loan)	26	(13)
2020–2025	Bristol City	214	(46)
2025–	Luton Town	54	(14)

International career^{‡}
2007–	Bermuda	32	(20)
- * Club domestic league appearances and goals as of 19:03, 21 November 2026 (UTC) ‡ National team caps and goals as of 19:58, 1 October 2026 (UTC)

Nahki Michael Wells (born 1 June 1990) is a Bermudian professional footballer who plays as a forward for EFL League One club Luton Town and the Bermuda national team.

Wells began his career in his native Bermuda, playing for Dandy Town Hornets and Bermuda Hogges. After moving to England, where he had a brief spell in non-league football with Eccleshill United, Wells subsequently played in the Football League for Carlisle United, Bradford City and Huddersfield Town. After a move to Burnley, he spent two spells on loan at Queens Park Rangers before making a permanent transfer to Bristol City.

== Club career ==
=== Early career ===
Wells was born in Hamilton. He began his career in his native Bermuda with the Dandy Town Hornets, a team he had first joined at the age of 12. Wells had a trial with Dutch club Ajax as a teenager; he was offered a contract but ultimately did not sign for the club. After spending the 2009–10 season with the senior team of the Dandy Town Hornets, scoring 20 goals, Wells spent the 2010 season in the USL PDL with the Bermuda Hogges, scoring 2 goals in 9 games.

Wells later moved to England to attend the Richmond International Academic and Soccer Academy in Leeds, graduating in the academy's first year, and also played club football with local non-League team Eccleshill United. Wells underwent a trial with Carlisle United in November 2010, his second with the club. Before moving to the UK, Wells sought the advice of compatriot Shaun Goater. In December 2010, it was announced that Wells would sign for Carlisle United on 1 January 2011. Wells made his debut for Carlisle United on 15 January 2011, in a League One game against Bristol Rovers. In March 2011, Wells publicly announced his wish to play at Wembley Stadium with Carlisle United in the 2011 Football League Trophy Final, to be played in April 2011. However, Wells did not make the matchday squad, as Carlisle United beat Brentford 1–0.

On 3 May 2011, it was announced that Wells' contract with Carlisle United would not be renewed at the end of the season.

=== Bradford City ===
==== 2011–12 season ====
In late June 2011, Wells went on trial with Bradford City alongside four other players. He signed a one-year contract with Bradford City on 22 July 2011. Wells made his debut for Bradford City on the opening day of the 2011–12 season, coming on as a 74th-minute substitute for Mark Stewart. He scored his first goal for the Bantams in a 4–2 win against Barnet.

On 9 March 2012, Bradford City exercised an option in Wells' contract, and extended his deal by one year. On 14 April, he scored a hat-trick as Bradford beat Northampton Town 3–1. He was later named in the Football League Two Team of the Week for that week. Following this, former Bradford City player Dean Windass urged Wells to remain with the club, while ex-Bermudian international Kyle Lightbourne compared him to Jermain Defoe. In early May, Wells and Bradford City began discussions over a new four-year contract, and later that month he publicly assured fans that he would stay with the club. In June there were further rumours of Wells leaving the club, while it was later revealed that he nearly never signed for the club in the first place. In July, Wells stated he was in no rush to sign a new contract.

==== 2012–13 season ====
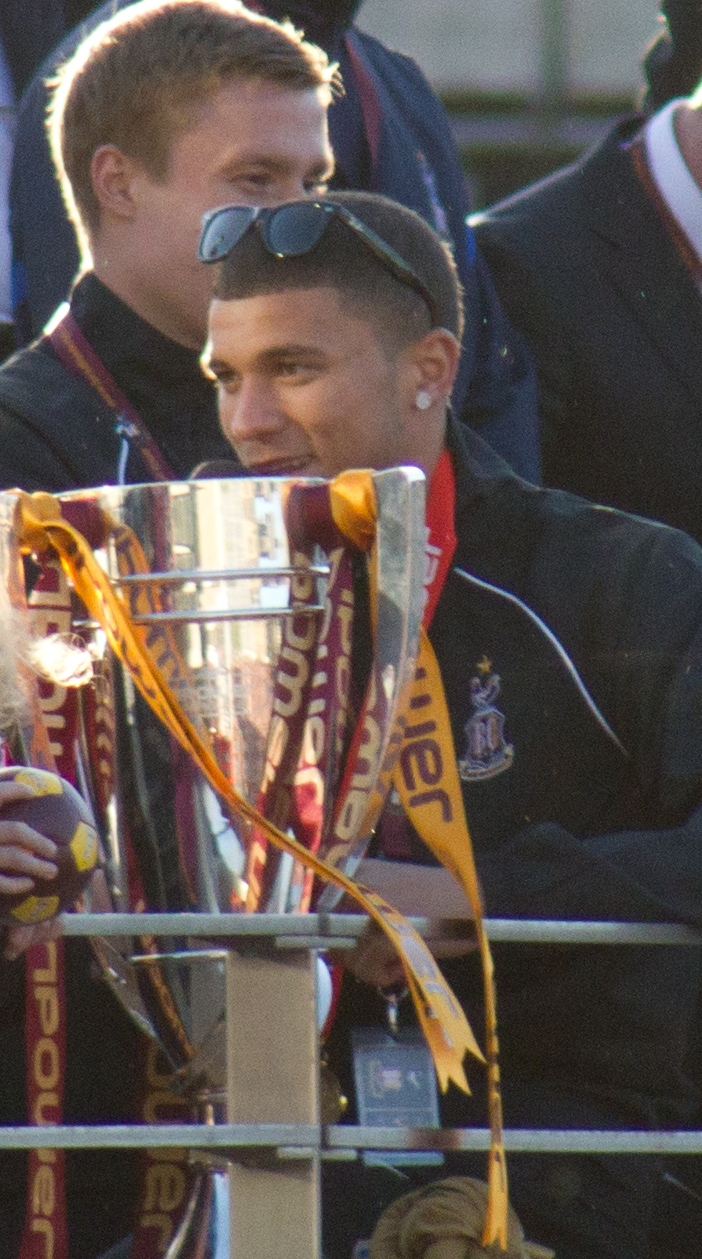
Wells celebrating Bradford City's victory in the 2013 League Two play-off final

Wells scored a penalty on the opening day of the 2012–13 season in an away match against Gillingham. He scored his second goal of the season on 25 August in a 5–1 win against AFC Wimbledon, and also assisted the fifth goal, crossing for James Hanson to score with a header. In September 2012, Wells suffered a hip injury. On 25 September, Wells came off the bench to score two late goals to help Bradford overturn a 2–0 deficit against Burton Albion in the League Cup third round, with Bradford going on to win the game 3–2 in extra time. At the end of September 2012, Wells signed a new three-year contract with the club, in a move praised by Phil Parkinson, the club's manager. In October 2012, Wells was banned by the club from celebrating his goals. As the January 2013 transfer window opened, Bradford City dismissed rumours linking Wells with a move away from the club. On 8 January 2013, he helped Bradford beat Premier League side Aston Villa 3–1 in the first leg of the semi-final of the League Cup by opening the scoring in the 19th minute. After appearing in the 2013 League Cup Final, Wells became the first player from Bermuda to appear in an English major cup final. Although Wells did not complete the game, prior to the match he spoke about being motivated by the recent death of a friend in a motorcycle accident, as well as how he was looking forward to facing opponents from a higher league. Wells hadn't scored for the club since 2 February 2013, until he scored the only goal of the game on 6 April 2013, in a 1–0 home victory against Northampton Town. Later that month, he was linked with a transfer to Burnley.

In May 2013, Wells scored three goals across two legs to help Bradford City qualify for the League Two play-off final. The goals took his tally for the season to 25, a target he had set himself before the season begun. He then scored in the final against Northampton Town, which Bradford won 3–0 to earn promotion to League One. Following the promotion, Wells stated he wished to stay at the club, though the club later admitted they might sell the player if a suitable offer came in. Former City player John Hendrie advised Wells to remain at the club.

==== 2013–14 season ====
Ahead of the 2013–14 season, Wells spoke of his desire for another good cup run, and his belief that the club could achieve a second successive promotion. In June 2012, manager Phil Parkinson said that only a high-money bid would persuade the club to sell either Wells or fellow striker James Hanson. In July 2013, the club rejected a bid from Peterborough United, and later revealed that they had had no further offers for the player. In August 2013, Wells' strike partner Hanson spoke positively of his partnership with Wells. On 24 August 2013, Wells scored two goals in a home match against Sheffield United; in the process he equalled a club record by scoring in his eighth consecutive match, which was originally set by Derek Stokes in 1959–60, a feat which was praised by teammate James Hanson. After the match the club re-stated that they would not sell Wells, and later confirmed they had not received any bids for the player on transfer deadline day. On 4 September 2013, Wells was nominated for the League One Player of the Month award, winning the award two days later. Wells has publicly praised his strike partnership with Hanson, as has journalist Simon Parker, who described them as "[one of] the best front pairs that League One has to offer." Of the 53 goals that Wells scored for Bradford City, 49 came when he was playing with Hanson.

In late September 2013 Wells suffered ankle ligament damage in a match, and was ruled out for a number of weeks. Manager Phil Parkinson stated he would not rush Wells back into play, Wells returned, after two months out, to score a hat-trick against Coventry City. In December 2013, club co-chairman Julian Rhodes admitted that the player might leave the club, as rumours surrounding the player's possible departure began to increase. That same month, colleague Andrew Davies described Wells and Hanson as the best strike pair in the division, and Davies also urged Wells to remain with the club, while manager Phil Parkinson said that he did not want the club to sell the player. Wells picked up an injury at the end of December 2013, and at the start of the January 2014 transfer window, manager Phil Parkinson said he wanted any transfer issues sorted quickly. The next day, 3 January 2014, the club announced that they had already rejected one offer for the player, after saying that Wells has been receiving interest from a number of Premier League clubs, as well as Championship side Burnley. The club also said they would lose £1 million for the 2013–14 season if they did not sell Wells. Despite all the speculation, Parkinson said he felt Wells would be able to ignore off-the-field matters and concentrate on his playing, though he later admitted that the player was being affected by the rumours.

=== Huddersfield Town ===
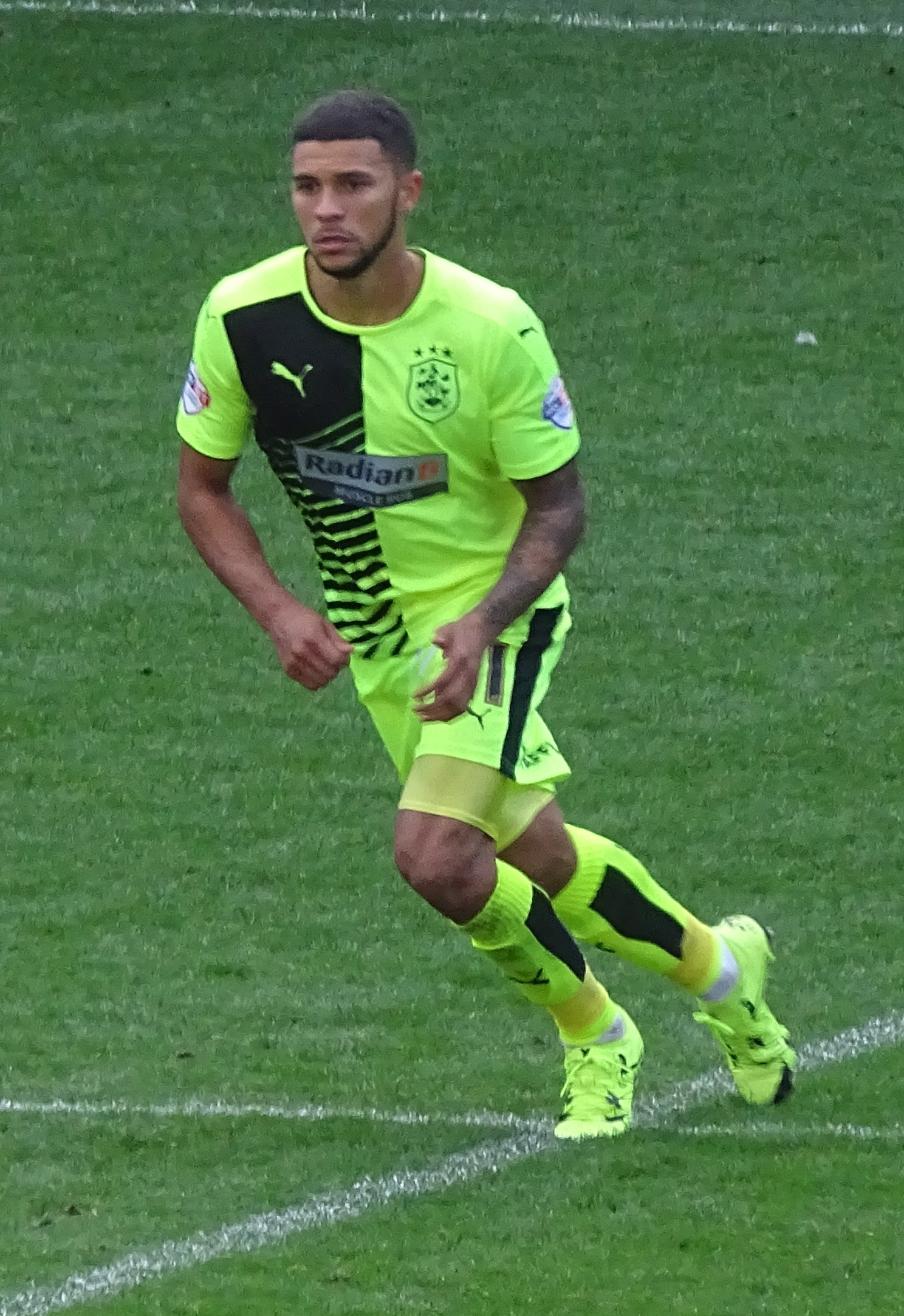
Wells playing for Huddersfield Town in 2015

On 10 January 2014, Wells signed a four-and-a-half-year contract with Huddersfield Town after transferring for an undisclosed club record fee. The deal was initially completed a one-game loan deal, to allow time for the paperwork for the permanent move to be completed. Wells was criticised by a section of Bradford City fans for moving from Bradford City to a team considered a rival. On 11 January 2014, Wells made his Huddersfield Town debut, appearing as a substitute in the 55th minute, and scoring the winning goal in a 1–0 home victory against Millwall, less than 24 hours after joining the club.

Wells ended his first full-season with Huddersfield Town as the club's top scorer with 14 goals. At the end of the 2016–17 season, former club Bradford City received a £250,000 bonus payment following Huddersfield's promotion to the Premier League.

=== Burnley ===
Wells, in the final year of his contract with Huddersfield, signed a three-year deal with Burnley for £5 million on 31 August 2017.

On 23 August 2018, Wells signed for Championship side Queens Park Rangers on a season-long loan. He scored his first goal for QPR against Sheffield Wednesday on 23 October 2018.

On 8 August 2019, Wells returned to QPR on loan for the 2019–20 season. In October 2019 he was nominated for the Championship's Player of the Month award for his form during September. He was recalled by Burnley on 27 January 2020.

=== Bristol City ===
Wells left Burnley and signed a three-and-a-half-year contract with Bristol City on 30 January 2020, for an undisclosed fee. In February 2020 he won the January 2020 EFL Championship Player of the Month award, which was won for his performances with Queens Park Rangers.

On 17 May 2025, the club said it was in contract negotiations with Wells. On 23 June 2025, it was confirmed that Wells would be leaving at the end of the month when his contract expired, with Wells saying he intended to stay in the Championship.

=== Luton Town ===
Despite stating he intended to remain in the Championship, Wells joined Luton Town, who had been relegated to League One at the end of the previous season, on 10 July 2025. He had been linked with a move back to previous club Bradford City, although this was later laughed off' by Bradford manager Graham Alexander. Wells missed the match against Bradford City on 16 August due to injury.

Wells scored two goals in the 2026 EFL Trophy final as Luton won 3–1.

== International career ==
Wells made his international debut for Bermuda in 2007.

Wells also made four unofficial international appearances for Bermuda in the 2007 Island Games.

In late August 2011, Wells was recalled by Bermuda, joining their squad for FIFA World Cup qualifying matches in early September 2011. Wells appeared in five 2014 FIFA World Cup qualifying matches for Bermuda, against Barbados, Guyana and Trinidad and Tobago.

Wells was described as "one of Bermuda's most promising players, with an exceptionally bright future" in February 2012 by then Sports Minister Glenn Blakeney, and was honoured by Premier Craig Cannonier in June 2013. He has been described as the country's "star footballer".

In May 2019, he was named to Bermuda's 40-man provisional squad for the 2019 Gold Cup. Later that month, he was named to the final 23-man squad. At the tournament, Wells scored twice, netting goals against Costa Rica in a 2–1 defeat, and against Nicaragua in a 2–0 victory.

== Career statistics ==
=== Club ===
As of match played 21 November 2026

Appearances and goals by club, season and competition
Club	Season	League			National Cup (Note: Includes FA Cup)		League Cup (Note: Includes EFL Cup)		Other		Total	
Club	Season	Division	Apps	Goals	Apps	Goals	Apps	Goals	Apps	Goals	Apps	Goals
Bermuda Hogges	2010	USL PDL	9	2	—		—		—		9	2
Carlisle United	2010–11	League One	3	0	—		—		—		3	0
Bradford City	2011–12	League Two	33	10	3	2	0	0	1 (Note: Appearances in Football League/EFL Trophy)	0	37	12
Bradford City	2012–13	League Two	39	18	3	1	7	3	5 (Note: Three appearances and four goals in League Two play-offs, two appearances in Football League Trophy)	4	54	26
Bradford City	2013–14	League One	19	14	1	0	1	1	0	0	21	15
Bradford City	Total		91	42	7	3	8	4	6	4	112	53
Huddersfield Town	2013–14	Championship	22	7	—		—		—		22	7
Huddersfield Town	2014–15	Championship	35	11	1	0	1	3	—		37	14
Huddersfield Town	2015–16	Championship	44	17	2	1	1	0	—		47	18
Huddersfield Town	2016–17	Championship	43	10	1	0	0	0	3 (Note: Appearances in the EFL Championship play-offs)	0	47	10
Huddersfield Town	Total		144	45	4	1	2	3	3	0	152	49
Burnley	2017–18	Premier League	9	0	1	0	0	0	—		10	0
Burnley	2018–19	Premier League	0	0	—		0	0	0	0	0	0
Burnley	2019–20	Premier League	0	0	—		—		—		0	0
Burnley	Total		9	0	1	0	0	0	0	0	10	0
Queens Park Rangers (loan)	2018–19	Championship	40	7	3	2	0	0	—		43	9
Queens Park Rangers (loan)	2019–20	Championship	26	13	1	1	2	1	—		29	15
Bristol City	2019–20	Championship	17	5	—		—		—		17	5
Bristol City	2020–21	Championship	46	10	3	1	1	0	—		50	11
Bristol City	2021–22	Championship	32	3	1	0	1	0	—		34	3
Bristol City	2022–23	Championship	45	11	4	0	3	0	—		52	11
Bristol City	2023–24	Championship	35	7	4	0	2	1	—		41	8
Bristol City	2024–25	Championship	39	10	1	0	1	0	2	0	42	10
Bristol City	Total		214	46	13	1	7	1	2	0	236	48
Luton Town	2025–26	League One	39	5	1	2	0	0	3	3	43	11
Luton Town	2026–27	League One	15	9	1	0	2	1	1	1	19	11
Luton Town	Total		54	14	2	2	2	1	4	4	62	22
Career total			590	169	30	10	21	10	15	8	656	197

=== International ===
As of match played 29 September 2026

Appearances and goals by national team and year
National team	Year	Apps	Goals
Bermuda	2007	2	0
Bermuda	2008	1	0
Bermuda	2011	5	2
Bermuda	2015	2	3
Bermuda	2018	1	1
Bermuda	2019	9	6
Bermuda	2021	2	4
Bermuda	2022	3	1
Bermuda	2023	1	0
Bermuda	2024	2	3
Bermuda	2025	3	0
Bermuda	2026	1	0
Total		32	20

Scores and results list Bermuda's goal tally first, score column indicates score after each Wells goal.

List of international goals scored by Nahki Wells
No.	Date	Venue	Opponent	Score	Result	Competition	Ref.
1	7 October 2011	Bermuda National Stadium, Devonshire Parish, Bermuda	Trinidad and Tobago	2–0	2–1	2014 FIFA World Cup qualification	
2	14 November 2011	Kensington Oval, Bridgetown, Barbados	Barbados	1–0	2–1	2014 FIFA World Cup qualification	
3	25 March 2015	Thomas Robinson Stadium, Nassau, The Bahamas	Bahamas	2–0	5–0	2018 FIFA World Cup qualification	
4	29 March 2015	Bermuda National Stadium, Devonshire Parish, Bermuda	Bahamas	1–0	3–0	2018 FIFA World Cup qualification	
5	29 March 2015	Bermuda National Stadium, Devonshire Parish, Bermuda	Bahamas	3–0	3–0	2018 FIFA World Cup qualification	
6	16 November 2018	Bermuda National Stadium, Devonshire Parish, Bermuda	El Salvador	1–0	1–0	2019–20 CONCACAF Nations League qualifying	
7	24 March 2019	Estadio Cibao FC, Santiago de los Caballeros, Dominican Republic	Dominican Republic	2–1	3–1	2019–20 CONCACAF Nations League qualifying	
8	20 June 2019	Toyota Stadium, Frisco, United States	Costa Rica	1–2	1–2	2019 CONCACAF Gold Cup	
9	24 June 2019	Red Bull Arena, Harrison, United States	Nicaragua	2–0	2–0	2019 CONCACAF Gold Cup	
10	8 September 2019	Estadio Rommel Fernández, Panama City, Panama	Panama	1–0	2–0	2019–20 CONCACAF Nations League A	
11	8 September 2019	Estadio Rommel Fernández, Panama City, Panama	Panama	2–0	2–0	2019–20 CONCACAF Nations League A	
12	11 October 2019	Bermuda National Stadium, Devonshire Parish, Bermuda	Mexico	1–3	1–5	2019–20 CONCACAF Nations League A	
13	2 July 2021	RV PNK Stadium, Fort Lauderdale, United States	Barbados	1–0	8–1	2021 CONCACAF Gold Cup qualification	
14	2 July 2021	RV PNK Stadium, Fort Lauderdale, United States	Barbados	2–0	8–1	2021 CONCACAF Gold Cup qualification	
15	2 July 2021	RV PNK Stadium, Fort Lauderdale, United States	Barbados	8–1	8–1	2021 CONCACAF Gold Cup qualification	
16	6 July 2021	RV PNK Stadium, Fort Lauderdale, United States	Haiti	1–3	1–4	2021 CONCACAF Gold Cup qualification	
17	11 June 2022	Félix Sánchez Olympic Stadium, Santo Domingo, Dominican Republic	Montserrat	2–2	2–3	2022–23 CONCACAF Nations League B	
18	12 October 2024	Bermuda National Stadium, Devonshire Parish, Bermuda	Dominica	1–0	6–1	2024–25 CONCACAF Nations League B	
19	12 October 2024	Bermuda National Stadium, Devonshire Parish, Bermuda	Dominica	2–0	6–1	2024–25 CONCACAF Nations League B	
20	12 October 2024	Bermuda National Stadium, Devonshire Parish, Bermuda	Dominica	3–0	6–1	2024–25 CONCACAF Nations League B	

== Honours ==
Bradford City

- Football League Two play-offs: 2013
- Football League Cup runner-up: 2012–13

Huddersfield Town

- EFL Championship play-offs: 2017

Luton Town

- EFL Trophy: 2025–26

Individual

- EFL Championship Player of the Month: January 2020
- PFA Fans' Player of the Month: September 2022
- Huddersfield Town Player of the Year: 2015–16
- Huddersfield Town Players' Player of the Year: 2015–16
- CONCACAF Gold Cup qualification Best XI: 2021
