= 2011–12 Huddersfield Town A.F.C. season =

2011–12 season of Huddersfield Town

Huddersfield Town A.F.C.
- Chairman: Dean Hoyle
- Manager: Lee Clark (until 15 February 2012); Simon Grayson (from 20 February 2012)
- Stadium: Galpharm Stadium
- Football League One: 4th (promoted via play-offs)
- Play-offs: Winners
- FA Cup: First round (eliminated by Swindon Town)
- League Cup: Second round (eliminated by Cardiff City)
- Johnstone's Paint Trophy: Second round (eliminated by Bradford City)
- Top goalscorer: League: Jordan Rhodes (36); All: Jordan Rhodes (40)
- Highest home attendance: 18,646 vs. Sheffield Wednesday (7 April 2012)
- Lowest home attendance: 10,489 vs. Bradford City (4 October 2011)
- Biggest win: 6–0 vs Wycombe Wanderers (6 January 2012)
- Biggest defeat: 1–4 vs Swindon Town (12 November 2011)
Home colours	Away colours

The 2011–12 campaign was Huddersfield Town's eighth consecutive season in the third tier of English football. After losing to Peterborough United in the play-off final the previous season, Town hoped to avoid the play-offs and push for automatic promotion this season.

This season saw Town sack their manager for the first time since the 2008–09 season, when Lee Clark left the club on 15 February 2012. He was replaced by the former Leeds United boss, Simon Grayson on 20 February.

At the end of the season, Town finished in 4th place, meaning a 3rd consecutive season in the play-offs. They played Milton Keynes Dons in the semi-finals, and won 3–2 on aggregate, winning the away leg 2–0, before losing the home leg 2–1.

They played Sheffield United in the final at Wembley Stadium on 26 May. After the match finished 0–0 after extra time, the Terriers won the penalty shoot-out 8–7, after every player on the pitch took a penalty. The decisive penalty was taken by the United goalkeeper Steve Simonsen, who saw his penalty go over the crossbar, giving Huddersfield the glory, and promotion to the Football League Championship.

== Squad at the start of the season ==
Note: Flags indicate national team as defined under FIFA eligibility rules; some limited exceptions apply. Players may hold more than one non-FIFA nationality.

No.	Pos.	Nation	Player
1	GK	ENG	Alex Smithies
2	DF	ENG	Calum Woods
3	DF	SCO	Gary Naysmith
4	MF	ISL	Joey Guðjónsson
5	DF	ENG	Peter Clarke (Captain)
6	DF	ENG	Jamie McCombe
7	MF	ENG	Gary Roberts
8	MF	ENG	Antony Kay
9	FW	ENG	Danny Cadamarteri
10	MF	ENG	Oscar Gobern
11	MF	ENG	Danny Ward
12	DF	ENG	Tom Clarke (on loan at Leyton Orient)
13	GK	ENG	Ian Bennett
14	MF	NIR	Damien Johnson (on loan from Plymouth Argyle)
15	DF	SCO	Liam Cooper (on loan from Hull City)
16	MF	SCO	Scott Arfield
17	FW	SCO	Jordan Rhodes

No.	Pos.	Nation	Player
18	MF	ENG	Tommy Miller
19	FW	IRL	Alan Lee
20	MF	IRL	Donal McDermott
21	FW	ENG	Lee Novak
22	MF	ENG	Anton Robinson
25	GK	IRL	Nick Colgan
26	GK	ENG	Lloyd Allinson
27	FW	ENG	Robbie Simpson (on loan at Oldham Athletic)
28	DF	ENG	Nathan Clarke (on loan at Oldham Athletic)
29	DF	ENG	Liam Ridehalgh (on loan at Swindon Town)
30	FW	ENG	Jimmy Spencer (on loan at Cheltenham Town)
31	MF	ENG	Chris Atkinson (on loan at Darlington)
32	DF	ENG	Jack Hunt
33	MF	ENG	Matt Crooks
34	MF	ENG	Aidan Chippendale (on loan at Inverness Caledonian Thistle)
35	DF	ENG	Greg Pearson
36	GK	CAN	Simon Thomas

== Kit ==
The 2011–12 season was the club's first with technical kit supplier Umbro, and two new kits were introduced. Kirklees College and Radian B continued their home and away shirt sponsorships, respectively.

The home kit consists of a white shirt with three light blue stripes, white shorts and black socks. The away shirt is red with a white and black double-chevron, and was worn with black shorts and white socks. The shorts and socks of both these kits were interchangeable in the event of a colour clash. On 5 November, Town wore a charity kit in their game against Walsall in Help For Heroes colours – a limited number of replicas were sold with proceeds going to the charity.

Supplier: Umbro
Sponsor(s): Kirklees College (home), Radian B (away)

Home	Home alternate	Away	Away alternate	Charity	GK home	GK away	GK third

Last updated: 15 September 2012.
Source: Npower League One 2011–12 – Historical Football Kits

== Review ==
Despite losing in the play-off final, there isn't expected to be a mass exodus of players, mainly due to the fact that most of them are on long-term contracts, although Nathan Clarke and Robbie Simpson were told that they could look for new clubs.

Town's first signing of the close season was the right-back Calum Woods from newly promoted Scottish Premier League side Dunfermline Athletic on a free transfer on 8 June. On 1 July, two more signings were added to the team, defender/midfielder Oscar Gobern signed for a fee of £275,000, which was settled by a tribunal from Southampton, and winger Donal McDermott signed from Manchester City, also on a fee to be settled by a tribunal. Experienced midfielder Tommy Miller was then snapped up on a one-year deal following his release by Yorkshire rivals Sheffield Wednesday. On 8 July, Town confirmed the signing of defender Liam Cooper on a season-long loan from Championship side Hull City. On 11 July, winger Danny Ward, who had a successful loan spell at the Terriers at the end of the season, signed a permanent 3-year deal for an undisclosed fee from Bolton Wanderers. On 19 July, the Terriers signed Plymouth Argyle midfielder Damien Johnson on a second consecutive season-long loan. The midfield was further bolstered with the signing of Anton Robinson from Bournemouth on 1 August for an undisclosed fee. On 5 August, Clark signed Canadian goalkeeper Simon Thomas on a free transfer following a successful loan spell. On 23 November, after losing an appeal to get Alan Lee's red card he received against Notts County rescinded, Town signed striker Jon Parkin on a 2-month loan from Cardiff City, which ended on 23 January. The following day, as the loan transfer window shut, Leeds United defender Alex Bruce on loan until 2 January 2012, but Leeds terminated it on 29 December. On 24 January 2012, Town brought in Reading defender Sean Morrison on loan for the rest of the season, after failing to make an appearance while on loan with the club the previous season. Just as the transfer window shut on 31 January, Town signed young Scottish centre-back Murray Wallace from Scottish First Division side Falkirk for an undisclosed fee, with Wallace returning to the Bairns for the remainder of the current season. His teammate at Falkirk, Kallum Higginbotham also joined Town for an undisclosed fee on the same day. On 16 March Town signed Uruguayan international midfielder Diego Arismendi on loan from Stoke City until the end of the season.

The first departure from the club during the post-season was right-back Lee Peltier, who joined Championship side Leicester City on 21 June, for an undisclosed fee, believed to be around £750,000. Following him out of the Galpharm was young defender Leigh Franks who joined Conference North side Alfreton Town on 23 June. Next to go was winger Anthony Pilkington, who joined Premier League new boys Norwich City on 6 July for an undisclosed fee, believed to be around £2 million. Young striker Jimmy Spencer joined Cheltenham Town on a 6-month loan on 20 July. 19 year-old midfielder Chris Atkinson left on a six-month loan deal at Conference National side Darlington on 25 July. On 19 August Nathan Clarke joined fellow League One side Oldham Athletic on loan until the end of January. Just as the transfer window shut on 31 August, young midfielder Aidan Chippendale joined Scottish Premier League side Inverness Caledonian Thistle on loan until January 2012. Tom Clarke left the club on 9 September, joining Leyton Orient on a 93-day emergency loan, and Robbie Simpson joined Oldham Athletic for the same deal the following day. They both returned to the Galpharm on 12 December. Simpson then returned to Oldham on 2 January, before making the move permanent on 30 January. Left-back Liam Ridehalgh joined Football League Two side Swindon Town on a month's loan on 28 September, which was extended to the end of the year, before he returned. On 4 November, young defender Greg Pearson joined Blyth Spartans on a month's loan. On 24 November, Jamie McCombe joined Preston North End on loan until 2 January 2012, but it was cut short on 22 December, owing to defensive injuries at Town, but then the following day, it was revealed that the termination could not go ahead for administrative reasons, so he stayed at Preston. On 5 January 2012, Liam Ridehalgh was sent on loan again, this time to Town's fellow League One side Chesterfield. On 31 January, as the transfer window shut, Donal McDermott left the club, just 6 months after joining to go to his former club, A.F.C. Bournemouth for an undisclosed fee. On 9 March, Nathan Clarke left on loan for Bury for the remainder of the season, and young midfielder Matt Crooks joined Conference North side FC Halifax Town for the rest of the season as well. On 22 March, just as the loan window shut, Kallum Higginbotham was sent on loan to Barnsley for the rest of the season, although he was recalled on 26 April. On 29 March, goalkeeper Lloyd Allinson was loaned out to Ilkeston for the rest of the season. On 27 April, Icelandic international Joey Guðjónsson had his contract terminated, citing "family reasons", and he returned home to his native Iceland, to play for his hometown club, ÍA.

== Squad at the end of the season ==
Note: Flags indicate national team as defined under FIFA eligibility rules; some limited exceptions apply. Players may hold more than one non-FIFA nationality.

No.	Pos.	Nation	Player
1	GK	ENG	Alex Smithies
2	DF	ENG	Calum Woods
3	DF	SCO	Gary Naysmith
5	DF	ENG	Peter Clarke (Captain)
6	DF	ENG	Jamie McCombe
7	MF	ENG	Gary Roberts
8	MF	ENG	Antony Kay
9	FW	ENG	Danny Cadamarteri
10	MF	ENG	Oscar Gobern
11	MF	ENG	Danny Ward
12	DF	ENG	Tom Clarke
13	GK	ENG	Ian Bennett
14	MF	NIR	Damien Johnson (on loan from Plymouth Argyle)
15	DF	ENG	Sean Morrison (on loan from Reading)
16	MF	SCO	Scott Arfield
17	FW	SCO	Jordan Rhodes
18	MF	ENG	Tommy Miller

No.	Pos.	Nation	Player
19	FW	IRL	Alan Lee
20	MF	URU	Diego Arismendi (on loan from Stoke City)
21	FW	ENG	Lee Novak
22	MF	ENG	Anton Robinson
25	GK	IRL	Nick Colgan
26	GK	ENG	Lloyd Allinson (on loan at Ilkeston)
27	FW	ENG	Kallum Higginbotham
28	DF	ENG	Nathan Clarke (on loan at Bury)
29	DF	ENG	Liam Ridehalgh (on loan at Chesterfield)
30	FW	ENG	Jimmy Spencer (on loan at Cheltenham Town)
31	MF	ENG	Chris Atkinson
32	DF	ENG	Jack Hunt
33	MF	ENG	Matt Crooks (on loan at FC Halifax Town)
34	MF	ENG	Aidan Chippendale
35	DF	ENG	Greg Pearson
36	GK	CAN	Simon Thomas
--	DF	SCO	Murray Wallace (on loan at Falkirk)

== Transfers ==
=== In ===
Date	Pos.	Name	From	Fee
8 June	DF	(England) Calum Woods	(Scotland) Dunfermline Athletic	Free
1 July	MF	(England) Oscar Gobern	(England) Southampton	£275,000
1 July	MF	(Republic of Ireland) Donal McDermott	(England) Manchester City	Tribunal
7 July	MF	(England) Tommy Miller	(England) Sheffield Wednesday	Free
11 July	MF	(England) Danny Ward	(England) Bolton Wanderers	Undisclosed Fee
1 August	MF	(England) Anton Robinson	(England) Bournemouth	Undisclosed Fee
5 August	GK	(Canada) Simon Thomas	(Canada) Vancouver Whitecaps	Free
31 January	DF	(Scotland) Murray Wallace	(Scotland) Falkirk	Undisclosed Fee
31 January	FW	(England) Kallum Higginbotham	(Scotland) Falkirk	Undisclosed Fee

=== Loans in ===
Date	Pos.	Name	From	Expiry
8 July	DF	(Scotland) Liam Cooper	(England) Hull City	June 2012
19 July	MF	(Northern Ireland) Damien Johnson	(England) Plymouth Argyle	June 2012
23 November	FW	(England) Jon Parkin	(Wales) Cardiff City	January 2012
24 November	DF	(Republic of Ireland) Alex Bruce	(England) Leeds United	January 2012
12 December	DF	(England) Tom Clarke	(England) Leyton Orient	Loan Ended
12 December	FW	(England) Robbie Simpson	(England) Oldham Athletic	Loan Ended
28 September	DF	(England) Liam Ridehalgh	(England) Swindon Town	Loan Ended
3 January	DF	(England) Jamie McCombe	(England) Preston North End	Loan Ended
4 January	MF	(England) Chris Atkinson	(England) Darlington	Loan Ended
4 January	DF	(England) Nathan Clarke	(England) Oldham Athletic	Loan Ended
4 January	DF	(England) Greg Pearson	(England) Blyth Spartans	Loan Ended
9 January	MF	(England) Aidan Chippendale	(Scotland) Inverness Caledonian Thistle	Loan Ended
24 January	DF	(Republic of Ireland) Sean Morrison	(England) Reading	June 2012
16 March	MF	(Uruguay) Diego Arismendi	(England) Stoke City	End Of Season
26 April	FW	(England) Kallum Higginbotham	(England) Barnsley	Recalled
7 May	DF	(England) Liam Ridehalgh	(England) Chesterfield	Loan Ended
7 May	DF	(Scotland) Murray Wallace	(Scotland) Falkirk	Loan Ended
7 May	DF	(England) Nathan Clarke	(England) Bury	Loan Ended
7 May	MF	(England) Matt Crooks	(England) FC Halifax Town	Loan Ended
7 May	GK	(England) Lloyd Allinson	(England) Ilkeston	Loan Ended

=== Out ===
Date	Pos.	Name	To	Fee
21 June	DF	(England) Lee Peltier	(England) Leicester City	Undisclosed Fee
23 June	DF	(England) Leigh Franks	(England) Alfreton Town	Free
6 July	MF	(Republic of Ireland) Anthony Pilkington	(England) Norwich City	Undisclosed Fee
30 January	FW	(England) Robbie Simpson	(England) Oldham Athletic	Contract Cancelled
31 January	MF	(Republic of Ireland) Donal McDermott	(England) A.F.C. Bournemouth	Undisclosed Fee
27 April	MF	(Iceland) Joey Guðjónsson	(Iceland) ÍA	Free

=== Loans out ===
Date	Pos.	Name	To	Expiry
20 July	FW	(England) Jimmy Spencer	(England) Cheltenham Town	End Of Season
25 July	MF	(England) Chris Atkinson	(England) Darlington	January 2012
19 August	DF	(England) Nathan Clarke	(England) Oldham Athletic	January 2012
31 August	MF	(England) Aidan Chippendale	(Scotland) Inverness Caledonian Thistle	January 2012
9 September	DF	(England) Tom Clarke	(England) Leyton Orient	December 2011
10 September	FW	(England) Robbie Simpson	(England) Oldham Athletic	December 2011
28 September	DF	(England) Liam Ridehalgh	(England) Swindon Town	December 2011
4 November	DF	(England) Greg Pearson	(England) Blyth Spartans	December 2011
24 November	DF	(England) Jamie McCombe	(England) Preston North End	January 2012
1 December	DF	(Scotland) Liam Cooper	(England) Hull City	Loan Cancelled
29 December	DF	(Republic of Ireland) Alex Bruce	(England) Leeds United	Loan Cancelled
2 January	FW	(England) Robbie Simpson	(England) Oldham Athletic	February 2012
5 January	DF	(England) Liam Ridehalgh	(England) Chesterfield	May 2012
23 January	FW	(England) Jon Parkin	(Wales) Cardiff City	Loan Ended
31 January	DF	(Scotland) Murray Wallace	(Scotland) Falkirk	End Of Season
9 March	DF	(England) Nathan Clarke	(England) Bury	End Of Season
9 March	MF	(England) Matt Crooks	(England) FC Halifax Town	End Of Season
23 March	FW	(England) Kallum Higginbotham	(England) Barnsley	End Of Season
29 March	GK	(England) Lloyd Allinson	(England) Ilkeston	End Of Season

== Statistics ==
=== Overview ===
Competition	First match	Last match	Starting round	Final position	Record							
Competition	First match	Last match	Starting round	Final position	Pld	W	D	L	GF	GA	GD	Win %
League One	6 August 2011	5 May 2012	Matchday 1	4th	46	21	18	7	79	47	+32	45.65
Play-offs	12 May 2012	26 May 2012	Semi-Finals	Final	3	1	1	1	3	2	+1	33.33
FA Cup	12 November 2011	12 November 2011	First round	First round	1	0	0	1	1	4	−3	0.00
League Cup	9 August 2011	23 August 2011	First round	Second round	2	1	0	1	7	7	+0	50.00
Johnstone's Paint Trophy	30 August 2011	4 October 2011	First round	Second round	2	1	1	0	4	3	+1	50.00
Total					54	24	20	10	94	63	+31	44.44

Last updated: 26 May 2012
Source: Competitions

=== League table ===
Pos	Team	Pld	W	D	L	GF	GA	GD	Pts	Promotion, qualification or relegation
2	Sheffield Wednesday (P)	46	28	9	9	81	48	+33	93	Promotion to Football League Championship
3	Sheffield United	46	27	9	10	92	51	+41	90	Qualification for League One play-offs (Note: Four teams play for one spot and promotion to Football League Championship.)
4	Huddersfield Town (O, P)	46	21	18	7	79	47	+32	81	Qualification for League One play-offs
5	Milton Keynes Dons	46	22	14	10	84	47	+37	80	Qualification for League One play-offs
6	Stevenage	46	18	19	9	69	44	+25	73	Qualification for League One play-offs

Updated to match(es) played on 5 May 2012. Source: BBC Sport
Rules for classification: 1) Points; 2) Goal difference; 3) Number of goals scored
(O) Play-off winners; (P) Promoted

=== Results summary ===
Overall								Home						Away					
Pld	W	D	L	GF	GA	GD	Pts	W	D	L	GF	GA	GD	W	D	L	GF	GA	GD
46	21	18	7	79	47	+32	81	14	6	3	34	19	+15	7	12	4	45	28	+17

Last updated: 5 May 2012.

==== Results by round ====
Round	1	2	3	4	5	6	7	8	9	10	11	12	13	14	15	16	17	18	19	20	21	22	23	24	25	26	27	28	29	30	31	32	33	34	35	36	37	38	39	40	41	42	43	44	45	46	47
Ground	H	A	A	H	H	A	H	A	H	A	H	A	H	A	H	A	A	H	H	A	H	A	H	H	A	A	H	H	A	A	H	H	A	A	H	H	A	A	A	H	A	H	A	A	H	A	H
Result	D	D	D	W	W	D	W	D	W	D	D	W	W	W	W	D	W	D	W	L	L	D	W	D	D	W	W	W	D	D	L	W	D	D	W	D	W	D	W	W	L	L	L	L	W	D	W
Performance	12	14	15	11	8	7	5	2	3	7	5	3	2	2	2	2	2	2	3	4	4	5	5	5	4	4	2	2	3	3	3	2	3	3	3	3	2	4	3	3	4	4	4	5	5	5	4

A = Away; H = Home; W = Win; D = Draw; L = Loss

== Squad statistics ==
=== Appearances and goals ===
As of 26 May 2012

No.	Pos	Nat	Player	Total		League One		FA Cup		League Cup		JP Trophy		Play-offs	
No.	Pos	Nat	Player	Apps	Goals	Apps	Goals	Apps	Goals	Apps	Goals	Apps	Goals	Apps	Goals
1	GK	(England) ENG	Alex Smithies	15	0	13+0	0	0+0	0	0+0	0	0+0	0	1+1	0
2	DF	(England) ENG	Calum Woods	31	0	23+3	0	1+0	0	0+0	0	1+0	0	3+0	0
3	DF	(Scotland) SCO	Gary Naysmith	26	0	20+2	0	1+0	0	2+0	0	1+0	0	0+0	0
4	MF	(Iceland) ISL	Joey Guðjónsson	8	0	6+2	0	0+0	0	0+0	0	0+0	0	0+0	0
5	DF	(England) ENG	Peter Clarke	36	1	31+0	0	0+0	0	1+0	0	1+0	1	3+0	0
6	DF	(England) ENG	Jamie McCombe	23	3	20+0	3	1+0	0	2+0	0	0+0	0	0+0	0
7	MF	(England) ENG	Gary Roberts	45	7	28+11	6	1+0	0	1+1	1	1+1	0	0+1	0
8	MF	(England) ENG	Antony Kay	32	1	26+3	1	1+0	0	0+0	0	1+1	0	0+0	0
9	FW	(England) ENG	Danny Cadamarteri	16	0	6+9	0	0+1	0	0+0	0	0+0	0	0+0	0
10	MF	(England) ENG	Oscar Gobern	25	2	19+2	2	0+0	0	1+1	0	2+0	0	0+0	0
11	MF	(England) ENG	Danny Ward	47	5	31+8	4	0+1	0	1+1	1	1+1	0	3+0	0
12	DF	(England) ENG	Tom Clarke	16	0	7+7	0	0+0	0	0+0	0	0+0	0	0+2	0
13	GK	(England) ENG	Ian Bennett	38	0	33+0	0	0+0	0	2+0	0	1+0	0	2+0	0
14	MF	(Northern Ireland) NIR	Damien Johnson (on loan)	21	0	16+2	0	0+0	0	0+0	0	0+0	0	3+0	0
15	DF	(Scotland) SCO	Liam Cooper (on loan)	7	0	2+2	0	0+0	0	1+0	0	2+0	0	0+0	0
15	DF	(Republic of Ireland) IRL	Sean Morrison (on loan)	22	1	19+0	1	0+0	0	0+0	0	0+0	0	3+0	0
16	MF	(Scotland) SCO	Scott Arfield	40	2	24+11	2	0+1	0	1+0	0	0+1	0	1+1	0
17	FW	(Scotland) SCO	Jordan Rhodes	45	40	36+4	36	0+0	0	1+0	2	1+0	0	3+0	2
18	MF	(England) ENG	Tommy Miller	33	2	24+2	1	1+0	0	2+0	0	1+0	1	3+0	0
19	FW	(Republic of Ireland) IRL	Alan Lee	38	7	18+13	7	1+0	0	0+2	0	2+0	0	0+2	0
20	MF	(Republic of Ireland) IRL	Donal McDermott	14	1	6+3	0	1+0	0	2+0	0	2+0	1	0+0	0
20	MF	(Uruguay) URU	Diego Arismendi	9	0	7+2	0	0+0	0	0+0	0	0+0	0	0+0	0
21	FW	(England) ENG	Lee Novak	49	17	29+12	13	1+0	1	2+0	2	1+1	1	3+0	0
22	MF	(England) ENG	Anton Robinson	30	1	12+13	1	1+0	0	1+0	0	2+0	0	0+1	0
24	FW	(England) ENG	Jon Parkin (on loan)	3	0	2+1	0	0+0	0	0+0	0	0+0	0	0+0	0
25	GK	(Republic of Ireland) IRL	Nick Colgan	2	0	0+0	0	1+0	0	0+0	0	1+0	0	0+0	0
27	FW	(England) ENG	Kallum Higginbotham	7	0	3+1	0	0+0	0	0+0	0	0+0	0	2+1	0
31	MF	(England) ENG	Chris Atkinson	1	0	0+1	0	0+0	0	0+0	0	0+0	0	0+0	0
32	DF	(England) ENG	Jack Hunt	50	3	43+0	1	0+0	0	2+0	1	2+0	0	3+0	1
44	DF	(Republic of Ireland) IRL	Alex Bruce (on loan)	3	0	3+0	0	0+0	0	0+0	0	0+0	0	0+0	0

=== Top scorers ===
Place	Position	Nation	Number	Name	League One	FA Cup	League Cup	JP Trophy	Play-offs	Total
1	FW	(Scotland)	17	Jordan Rhodes	36	0	2	0	2	40
2	FW	(England)	21	Lee Novak	13	1	2	1	0	17
3=	MF	(England)	7	Gary Roberts	6	0	1	0	0	7
3=	FW	(Republic of Ireland)	19	Alan Lee	7	0	0	0	0	7
5	MF	(England)	11	Danny Ward	4	0	1	0	0	5
6=	DF	(England)	6	Jamie McCombe	3	0	0	0	0	3
6=	DF	(England)	32	Jack Hunt	1	0	1	0	1	3
8=	MF	(England)	10	Oscar Gobern	2	0	0	0	0	2
8=	MF	(Scotland)	16	Scott Arfield	2	0	0	0	0	2
8=	MF	(England)	18	Tommy Miller	1	0	0	1	0	2
11=	DF	(England)	5	Peter Clarke	0	0	0	1	0	1
11=	DF	(England)	8	Antony Kay	1	0	0	0	0	1
11=	DF	(Republic of Ireland)	15	Sean Morrison	1	0	0	0	0	1
11=	MF	(Republic of Ireland)	20	Donal McDermott	0	0	0	1	0	1
11=	MF	(England)	22	Anton Robinson	1	0	0	0	0	1
11=				Own goals	1	0	0	0	0	1
				TOTALS	79	1	7	4	3	94

=== Disciplinary record ===
Number	Nation	Position	Name	League One		FA Cup		League Cup		JP Trophy		Play-offs		Total	
Number	Nation	Position	Name	Yellow card	Red card	Yellow card	Red card	Yellow card	Red card	Yellow card	Red card	Yellow card	Red card	Yellow card	Red card
32	(England)	DF	Jack Hunt	9	0	0	0	1	0	1	0	0	0	11	0
19	(Republic of Ireland)	FW	Alan Lee	5	1	0	0	1	0	1	0	0	0	7	1
5	(England)	DF	Peter Clarke	4	0	0	0	1	0	1	0	1	0	7	0
2	(England)	DF	Calum Woods	5	0	0	0	0	0	1	0	0	0	6	0
22	(England)	MF	Anton Robinson	5	0	0	0	0	0	1	0	0	0	6	0
8	(England)	MF	Antony Kay	4	0	0	0	0	0	1	0	0	0	5	0
18	(England)	MF	Tommy Miller	4	0	0	0	0	0	0	0	1	0	5	0
3	(Scotland)	DF	Gary Naysmith	3	0	1	0	0	0	0	0	0	0	4	0
7	(England)	MF	Gary Roberts	3	0	1	0	0	0	0	0	0	0	4	0
10	(England)	MF	Oscar Gobern	4	0	0	0	0	0	0	0	0	0	4	0
14	(Northern Ireland)	MF	Damien Johnson	3	0	0	0	0	0	0	0	1	0	4	0
21	(England)	FW	Lee Novak	3	0	0	0	0	0	0	0	0	0	3	0
6	(England)	DF	Jamie McCombe	2	1	0	0	0	0	0	0	0	0	2	1
11	(England)	MF	Danny Ward	2	0	0	0	0	0	0	0	0	0	2	0
15	(Republic of Ireland)	DF	Sean Morrison	1	0	0	0	0	0	0	0	1	0	2	0
16	(Scotland)	MF	Scott Arfield	2	0	0	0	0	0	0	0	0	0	2	0
20	(Uruguay)	MF	Diego Arismendi	2	0	0	0	0	0	0	0	0	0	2	0
1	(England)	GK	Alex Smithies	1	0	0	0	0	0	0	0	0	0	1	0
4	(Iceland)	MF	Joey Guðjónsson	1	0	0	0	0	0	0	0	0	0	1	0
9	(England)	FW	Danny Cadamarteri	1	0	0	0	0	0	0	0	0	0	1	0
12	(England)	DF	Tom Clarke	1	0	0	0	0	0	0	0	0	0	1	0
20	(Republic of Ireland)	MF	Donal McDermott	1	0	0	0	0	0	0	0	0	0	1	0
27	(England)	MF	Kallum Higginbotham	0	0	0	0	0	0	0	0	1	0	1	0
44	(Republic of Ireland)	DF	Alex Bruce	1	0	0	0	0	0	0	0	0	0	1	0
			Totals	67	2	2	0	3	0	6	0	5	0	83	2

== Results ==
=== Pre-season ===
9 July 2011	Gateshead	0–1	Huddersfield Town	Gateshead
15:00			Novak 29'	Stadium: Gateshead International Stadium; Attendance: 604

13 July 2011	Wrexham	1–2	Huddersfield Town	Wrexham
15:00			Rhodes 12'; Novak 84'	Stadium: Racecourse Ground; Attendance: 950

14 July 2011	Sheffield	2–0	Huddersfield Town	Dronfield
15:00				Stadium: Coach and Horses Ground

17 July 2011	Hamilton Academical	0–2	Huddersfield Town	Hamilton
15:00			Ward 5'; Lee 24'	Stadium: New Douglas Park; Attendance: 820

19 July 2011	Dunfermline Athletic	1–2	Huddersfield Town	Dunfermline
15:00			Rhodes 39', 42'	Stadium: East End Park; Attendance: 1,164

21 July 2011	Emley	2–1	Huddersfield Town	Emley
15:00			Charlton 90+4'	Stadium: Welfare Ground; Attendance: 1,500

22 July 2011	Fleetwood Town	0–3	Huddersfield Town	Fleetwood
15:00			Roberts 23'; McDermott 64'; Novak 74'	Stadium: Highbury Stadium; Attendance: 945

28 July 2011	Eastwood Town	1–2	Huddersfield Town	Eastwood
15:00			Crooks 68'; Lee 71'	Stadium: Coronation Park

30 July 2011	Rotherham United	1–3	Huddersfield Town	Sheffield
15:00			McDermott 63'; Novak 72'; Rhodes 82'	Stadium: Don Valley Stadium; Attendance: 1,012

=== League One ===
6 August 2011 1	Huddersfield Town	1–1	Bury	Huddersfield
15:00	Roberts (yellow card) 35'; Roberts 66'		Sodje (yellow card) 25'; Lowe 77'; Sweeney (yellow card) 79'	Stadium: Galpharm Stadium; Attendance: 13,873; Referee: Graham Scott

13 August 2011 2	Rochdale	2–2	Huddersfield Town	Rochdale
15:00	Akpa Akpro 43'; Grimes 89'; Darby (yellow card) 90'		Novak 15'; Gobern (yellow card) 35'; Ward 69'	Stadium: Spotland; Attendance: 5,074; Referee: Andy Haines

16 August 2011 3	Hartlepool United	0–0	Huddersfield Town	Hartlepool
19:45	Austin (yellow card) 9'		Miller (yellow card) 74'	Stadium: Victoria Park; Attendance: 5,506; Referee: Gary Sutton

20 August 2011 4	Huddersfield Town	3–2	Colchester United	Huddersfield
15:00	Rhodes 3', 59'; Novak 64'; Robinson (yellow card) 68'; McDermott (yellow card) 76'; Kay (yellow card) 90+3'		Odejayi 5'; Heath (yellow card) 22'; Antonio 27'; Henderson (yellow card) 36'; O'Toole (yellow card) 79'	Stadium: Galpharm Stadium; Attendance: 11,043; Referee: Ian Williamson

27 August 2011 5	Huddersfield Town	3–0	Wycombe Wanderers	Huddersfield
15:00	Lee 57', 71'; Roberts 82'		Tunnicliffe (yellow card) 28'; Donnelly (yellow card) 66'	Stadium: Galpharm Stadium; Attendance: 11,953; Referee: Nigel Miller

3 September 2011 6	Oldham Athletic	1–1	Huddersfield Town	Oldham
15:00	Kuqi 7'; Wesolowski (yellow card) 63'; Diallo (yellow card) 76'		Kay 16'; Gobern (yellow card) 64'	Stadium: Boundary Park; Attendance: 6,213; Referee: Colin Webster

10 September 2011 7	Huddersfield Town	2–0	Tranmere Rovers	Huddersfield
15:00	Roberts (yellow card) 21'; Roberts 24'; Arfield 82'; Kay (yellow card) 89'		Showunmi (yellow card) 41'	Stadium: Galpharm Stadium; Attendance: 12,013; Referee: Chris Sarginson

13 September 2011 8	Sheffield United	0–3	Huddersfield Town	Sheffield
19:45			Novak 20', 37'; Gobern 40'; Lee (yellow card) 81'; Hunt (yellow card) 90+4'	Stadium: Bramall Lane; Attendance: 17,373; Referee: Graham Salisbury

17 September 2011 9	Milton Keynes Dons	1–1	Huddersfield Town	Milton Keynes
15:00	Lewington 65'; MacKenzie (yellow card) 85'		Arfield 37'; Woods (yellow card) 72'; Novak (yellow card) 90'	Stadium: Stadium mk Attendance: 8,243; Referee: Chris Foy

24 September 2011 10	Huddersfield Town	2–2	Leyton Orient	Huddersfield
15:00	Lee 23'; Woods (yellow card) 55'; Hunt 67'; McCombe (red card) 84'		Omozusi (yellow card) 71'; Lisbie 85'; Chorley 90+1'	Stadium: Galpharm Stadium; Attendance: 12,269; Referee: Rob Lewis

1 October 2011 11	Brentford	0–4	Huddersfield Town	Brentford
15:00			Rhodes 36', 76'; Johnson (yellow card) 55'; Novak 70'; Roberts 78'	Stadium: Griffin Park; Attendance: 6,101; Referee: Fred Graham

8 October 2011 12	Huddersfield Town	2–1	Stevenage	Huddersfield
15:00	Johnson (yellow card) 39'; Roberts 44'; Robinson (yellow card) 69'; Novak 76'; Kay (yellow card) 89'; Lee (yellow card) 90'		Bostwick (yellow card) 20'; Laird 67'	Stadium: Galpharm Stadium; Attendance: 12,890; Referee: Steve Ruston

15 October 2011 13	Exeter City	0–4	Huddersfield Town	Exeter
15:00	Nardiello (yellow card) 43'; Bauzà (yellow card) 61'		Lee 8'; Rhodes 26', 65', 89'	Stadium: St James Park; Attendance: 4,244; Referee: Keith Stroud

22 October 2011 14	Huddersfield Town	3–1	Preston North End	Huddersfield
15:00	Rhodes 4', 42', 57'; P. Clarke (yellow card) 39'; Woods (yellow card) 74'; Miller (yellow card) 76'; Hunt (yellow card) 81'		Coutts (yellow card) 10'; Carlisle (yellow card) 27'; Tsoumou 61'	Stadium: Galpharm Stadium; Attendance: 16,804; Referee: Mark Halsey

25 October 2011 15	Scunthorpe United	2–2	Huddersfield Town	Scunthorpe
19:45	Norwood 10'; Duffy (yellow card) 45'; Norwood (yellow card) 67'; Dagnall 88'		Miller 25'; Naysmith (yellow card) 72'; P. Clarke (yellow card) 73'; Rhodes 86'; Ward (yellow card) 90+4'	Stadium: Glanford Park; Attendance: 5,858; Referee: Eddie Ilderton

29 October 2011 16	Yeovil Town	0–1	Huddersfield Town	Yeovil
15:00	N'Gala (yellow card) 90+1'; Upson (yellow card) 90+2'		Arfield (yellow card) 35'; Lee (yellow card) 55'; Robinson 80'	Stadium: Huish Park; Attendance: 3,486; Referee: Dean Whitestone

5 November 2011 17	Huddersfield Town	1–1	Walsall	Huddersfield
15:00	Novak 67'; Hunt (yellow card) 90+2'		Nicholls (yellow card) 50'; Paterson 78'	Stadium: Galpharm Stadium; Attendance: 13,005; Referee: Scott Mathieson

19 November 2011 18	Huddersfield Town	2–1	Notts County	Huddersfield
15:00	Rhodes 46', 65'; Lee (red card) 61'; Hunt (yellow card) 69'		Sodje (yellow card) 48'; Bishop (yellow card) 72'; Bishop 90+4'	Stadium: Galpharm Stadium; Attendance: 13,227; Referee: Darren Drysdale

28 November 2011 19	Charlton Athletic	2–0	Huddersfield Town	London
19:45	Kermorgant 23'; Ephraim 41'		Robinson (yellow card) 58'	Stadium: The Valley; Attendance: 18,029; Referee: Roger East

10 December 2011 20	Huddersfield Town	0–1	AFC Bournemouth	Huddersfield
15:00			Arter 19' (yellow card) 66'; Barrett (yellow card) 89'	Stadium: Galpharm Stadium; Attendance: 13,930; Referee: Anthony Bates

17 December 2011 21	Sheffield Wednesday	4–4	Huddersfield Town	Sheffield
15:00	Jones 26'; Johnson 28'; Marshall 63'; O'Grady 74'		Rhodes 12', 16', 77', 90+7'	Stadium: Hillsborough Stadium; Attendance: 28,600; Referee: Darren Deadman

26 December 2011 22	Huddersfield Town	1–0	Chesterfield	Huddersfield
15:00	Rhodes 34'			Stadium: Galpharm Stadium; Attendance: 15,380; Referee: Carl Boyeson

30 December 2011 23	Huddersfield Town	1–1	Carlisle United	Huddersfield
19:45	Rhodes 38'		Noble 8'; Noble (yellow card) 69'; Thirlwell (yellow card) 78'	Stadium: Galpharm Stadium; Attendance: 13,962; Referee: Michael Naylor

2 January 2012 24	Notts County	2–2	Huddersfield Town	Nottingham
15:00	J. Hughes 72' (pen.); Judge (yellow card) 81'; L. Hughes 84'		Hunt (yellow card) 14'; Roberts 52'; Rhodes 58'	Stadium: Meadow Lane; Attendance: 8,914; Referee: Nigel Miller

6 January 2012 25	Wycombe Wanderers	0–6	Huddersfield Town	High Wycombe
19:45	Halls (yellow card) 78'		Gobern 10'; Rhodes 19', 25', 49', 58', 69'	Stadium: Adams Park; Attendance: 4,456; Referee: Steve Tanner

14 January 2012 26	Huddersfield Town	1–0	Oldham Athletic	Huddersfield
15:00	Robinson (yellow card) 35'; Lee 86'		Scapuzzi (yellow card) 90+2'	Stadium: Galpharm Stadium; Attendance: 15,229; Referee: Geoff Eltringham

21 January 2012 27	Huddersfield Town	3–2	Brentford	Huddersfield
17:20	McCombe (yellow card) 21'; Lee 41'; McCombe 45+2'; Rhodes 50'		Alexander 21' (pen.), 29'; Bidwell (yellow card) 43'	Stadium: Galpharm Stadium; Attendance: 14,405; Referee: Colin Webster

28 January 2012 28	Tranmere Rovers	1–1	Huddersfield Town	Birkenhead
15:00	McGurk 51'; Wallace (yellow card) 90+1'		Rhodes 49'; Gobern (yellow card) 61'; McCombe (yellow card) 80'	Stadium: Prenton Park; Attendance: 5,851; Referee: Trevor Kettle

4 February 2012 29	Huddersfield Town	1–1	Milton Keynes Dons	Huddersfield
15:00	McCombe 45'; Naysmith (yellow card) 48'; Miller (yellow card) 51'		Gleeson 62'; Smith (yellow card) 64'	Stadium: Galpharm Stadium; Attendance: 15,898; Referee: Graham Salisbury

14 February 2012 30	Huddersfield Town	0–1	Sheffield United	Huddersfield
19:45	Lee (yellow card) 58'; Naysmith (yellow card) 64'		Collins 5'; McDonald (yellow card) 40'; Simonsen (yellow card) 57'; Maguire (yellow card) 63'	Stadium: Galpharm Stadium; Attendance: 17,320; Referee: Kevin Friend

25 February 2012 31	Huddersfield Town	2–0	Exeter City	Huddersfield
15:00	McCombe 40'; Rhodes 85'			Stadium: Galpharm Stadium; Attendance: 14,105; Referee: Mark Heywood

28 February 2012 32	Stevenage	2–2	Huddersfield Town	Stevenage
19:45	Byrom (yellow card) 40'; Bostwick 71'; Shroot 88'; Shroot (yellow card) 89'		Ward 50'; Novak 55'; Cadamarteri (yellow card) 69'; Novak (yellow card) 76'	Stadium: Lamex Stadium; Attendance: 3,059; Referee: Dean Whitestone

3 March 2012 33	Bury	3–3	Huddersfield Town	Bury
15:00	Schumacher 32'; John-Lewis 70'; Eastham (yellow card) 78'; Eastham 90+2'		Morrison 21'; Rhodes 25', 29'; Hunt (yellow card) 34'	Stadium: Gigg Lane; Attendance: 5,988; Referee: Fred Graham

6 March 2012 34	Huddersfield Town	1–0	Hartlepool United	Huddersfield
19:45	Lee 75'		Baldwin (yellow card) 61'	Stadium: Galpharm Stadium; Attendance: 12,316; Referee: Paul Tierney

10 March 2012 35	Huddersfield Town	2–2	Rochdale	Huddersfield
15:00	Ward 45+1'; Rhodes 48'		Tutte 45+2'; Grimes 82'; Long (yellow card) 84'	Stadium: Galpharm Stadium; Attendance: 13,715; Referee: David Webb

17 March 2012 36	Colchester United	1–1	Huddersfield Town	Colchester
15:00	Gillespie 3'; Massey (yellow card) 86'		Roberts (yellow card) 53'; Hunt (yellow card) 86'; Guðjónsson (yellow card) 87'; Okuonghae 90+5' (o.g.)	Stadium: Colchester Community Stadium; Attendance: 3,929; Referee: Dean Mohareb

20 March 2012 37	Chesterfield	0–2	Huddersfield Town	Chesterfield
19:45			Novak 23'; Rhodes 27'	Stadium: B2net Stadium; Attendance: 6,916; Referee: Chris Sarginson

24 March 2012 38	Huddersfield Town	1–0	Charlton Athletic	Huddersfield
15:00	Rhodes 14' (pen.); Kay (yellow card) 57'; Novak (yellow card) 58'; Smithies (yellow card) 90+4'		Russell (red card) 57'	Stadium: Galpharm Stadium; Attendance: 15,735; Referee: Carl Boyeson

31 March 2012 39	Carlisle United	2–1	Huddersfield Town	Carlisle
15:00	Berrett 48'; Miller 90+5'		Arismendi (yellow card) 23'; Novak 80'; P. Clarke (yellow card) 84'	Stadium: Brunton Park; Attendance: 7,530; Referee: Nigel Miller

3 April 2012 40	Leyton Orient	1–3	Huddersfield Town	Leyton
19:45	Spring 14'; Smith (yellow card) 51'		Rhodes 18', 45+1', 90'; Hunt (yellow card) 33'; Lee (yellow card) 42'	Stadium: Matchroom Stadium; Attendance: 3,674; Referee: James Linington

7 April 2012 41	Huddersfield Town	0–2	Sheffield Wednesday	Huddersfield
12:30			Batth (yellow card) 44'; Llera 54'; Ranger 72'; Llera (yellow card) 90+2'	Stadium: Galpharm Stadium; Attendance: 18,646; Referee: Anthony Taylor

9 April 2012 42	AFC Bournemouth	2–0	Huddersfield Town	Bournemouth
15:00	Hines (yellow card) 30'; Malone 72'; Pugh 82'		T. Clarke (yellow card) 25'; Arfield (yellow card) 69'	Stadium: Seward Stadium; Attendance: 5,500; Referee: Graham Salisbury

14 April 2012 43	Preston North End	1–0	Huddersfield Town	Preston
15:00	Morgan (yellow card) 45+2'; Robertson 54'; Coutts (yellow card) 61'; Robertson (yellow card) 82'		Robinson (yellow card) 36'; Hunt (yellow card) 78'; Woods (yellow card) 79'	Stadium: Deepdale; Attendance: 11,267; Referee: Andy D'Urso

21 April 2012 44	Huddersfield Town	1–0	Scunthorpe United	Huddersfield
15:00	Arismendi (yellow card) 37'; Morrison (yellow card) 78'; Ward (yellow card) 82'; Novak 89'			Stadium: Galpharm Stadium; Attendance: 13,086; Referee: Andy Woolmer

28 April 2012 45	Walsall	1–1	Huddersfield Town	Walsall
15:00	Cuvelier 49'		Novak 2'	Stadium: Bescot Stadium; Attendance: 4,646; Referee: Anthony Bates

5 May 2012 46	Huddersfield Town	2–0	Yeovil Town	Huddersfield
15:00	Johnson (yellow card) 3'; Novak 45'; Ward 72'		N'Gala (yellow card) 9'	Stadium: Galpharm Stadium; Attendance: 13,520; Referee: Carl Berry

=== Football League One play-offs ===
12 May 2012 Semi-final first leg	Milton Keynes Dons	0–2	Huddersfield Town	Milton Keynes
12:30	Chicksen (yellow card) 90'		P. Clarke (yellow card) 25'; Rhodes 32'; Miller (yellow card) 70'; Hunt 73'	Stadium: stadium mk Attendance: 11,893; Referee: Darren Deadman

15 May 2012 Semi-final second leg	Huddersfield Town	1–2 (3–2 agg.)	Milton Keynes Dons	Huddersfield
19:45	Rhodes 18'; Morrison (yellow card) 90+3'		Powell 39'; Smith 90+3'	Stadium: Galpharm Stadium; Attendance: 15,085; Referee: Scott Mathieson

26 May 2012 Final	Huddersfield Town	0–0 (a.e.t.) (8–7 p)	Sheffield United	Wembley
15:00	Higginbotham (yellow card) 62'; Johnson (yellow card) 113'		Maguire (yellow card) 105+1'	Stadium: Wembley Stadium; Attendance: 52,100; Referee: Roger East
	Penalties
	Miller: Simonsen saved (penalty missed); Johnson: wide (penalty missed); Lee: Simonsen saved (penalty missed); Clarke (penalty scored); Arfield (penalty scored); Rhodes (penalty scored); Roberts (penalty scored); Woods (penalty scored); Hunt (penalty scored); Morrison (penalty scored); Smithies (penalty scored)		(penalty missed) Williamson: Smithies saved (penalty scored) Collins; (penalty missed) Lowton: Smithies saved (penalty missed) Taylor: hit post (penalty scored) Porter; (penalty scored) Quinn; (penalty scored) Maguire; (penalty scored) Doyle; (penalty scored) O'Halloran; (penalty scored) Hill; (penalty missed) Simonsen: over bar

=== FA Cup ===
12 November 2011 First round	Swindon Town	4–1	Huddersfield Town	Swindon
15:00	Flint 36'; De Vita 39'; Kerrouche 76'; Ferry 88'		Novak 22'; Roberts (yellow card) 35'; Naysmith (yellow card) 45+2'	Stadium: County Ground; Attendance: 5,728; Referee: Paul Gibbs

=== League Cup ===
9 August 2011 First round	Port Vale	2–4	Huddersfield Town	Stoke-on-Trent
19:45	Roberts 24'; Loft 83' (pen.)		Novak 29', 38'; Hunt 58'; Roberts 67'	Stadium: Vale Park; Attendance: 3,014; Referee: Robert Jones

23 August 2011 Second round	Cardiff City	5–3	Huddersfield Town	Cardiff
19:45	Gyepes 16'; Parkin 17'; Cowie 90+3', 117'; Conway 96'; Blake (yellow card) 112'		Rhodes 53', 88'; Ward 70'; P. Clarke (yellow card) 89'; Lee (yellow card) 94'; Hunt (yellow card) 98'	Stadium: Cardiff City Stadium; Attendance: 6,829; Referee: James Linington

=== Johnstone's Paint Trophy ===
30 August 2011 First round	Northampton Town	1–2	Huddersfield Town	Northampton
19:45	Jacobs 41'; Tozer (yellow card) 86'		Kay (yellow card) 29'; McDermott 39'; Robinson (yellow card) 65'; Novak 82'; Lee (yellow card) 86'	Stadium: Sixfields Stadium; Attendance: 1,776; Referee: Darren Deadman

4 October 2011 Second round	Huddersfield Town	2–2 (3–4 p)	Bradford City	Huddersfield
19:00	P. Clarke (yellow card) 2'; Kay (yellow card) 54'; Miller 63' (pen.); P. Clarke 70'; Hunt (yellow card) 86'		Duke (yellow card) 12'; Rodney (yellow card) 21'; Kay 55' (o.g.); Oliver 64'	Stadium: Galpharm Stadium; Attendance: 10,489; Referee: Paul Tierney
	Penalties
	Novak (penalty scored); Miller: Duke saved (penalty missed); Ward (penalty scored); Kay: over crossbar (penalty missed); Lee (penalty scored)		Flynn: over crossbar (penalty missed); Stewart (penalty scored); Reid (penalty scored); Threlfall (penalty scored); Rodney (penalty scored)
