= Lee Novak =

English footballer (born 1988)

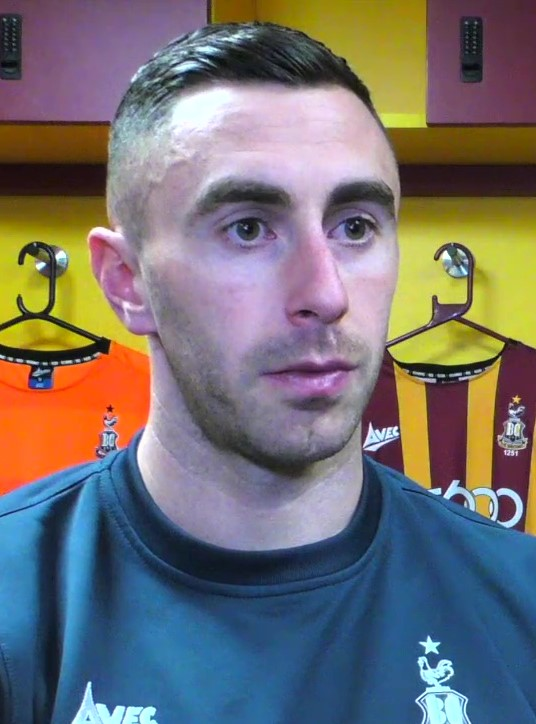
- Novak in 2020

Personal information
- Full name: Lee Paul Novak
- Date of birth: 28 September 1988 (age 38)
- Place of birth: Newcastle upon Tyne, England
- Height: 6 ft 0 in (1.83 m)
- Position: Striker

Youth career
- Wallsend Boys Club
- Gretna

Senior career*
Years	Team	Apps	(Gls)
2006–2007	Gretna	0	(0)
2007–2008	Newcastle Blue Star		(27)
2008–2009	Gateshead	18	(16)
2009–2013	Huddersfield Town	144	(34)
2009	→ Gateshead (loan)	14	(10)
2013–2016	Birmingham City	59	(10)
2015–2016	→ Chesterfield (loan)	35	(14)
2016–2017	Charlton Athletic	31	(2)
2017–2020	Scunthorpe United	94	(23)
2020–2021	Bradford City	23	(8)
Total		413+	(141)
- * Club domestic league appearances and goals

Lee Paul Novak (born 28 September 1988) is an English former professional footballer who played as a striker.

A former youth team player for Wallsend Boys Club, he began his senior career with Scottish club Gretna, before returning to his hometown with non-league side Newcastle Blue Star. He joined Gateshead for £3,000 in 2008. He won a £150,000 move to Huddersfield Town in January 2009, though immediately returned to Gateshead on loan and helped the club to promotion out of the Conference North as he ended the 2008–09 season as the division's top-scorer. He helped the "Terriers" to win promotion out of League One with victory in the 2012 play-off final. He signed for Championship club Birmingham City in 2013, and spent the 2015–16 season on loan to League One Chesterfield. Released by Birmingham in 2016, he joined Charlton Athletic, and just over a season later, he signed for yet another League One club, Scunthorpe United.

== Career ==
=== Early career ===
Born in Newcastle upon Tyne, Tyne and Wear, Novak grew up supporting Newcastle United. He played for Wallsend Boys Club, a well respected youth side. Novak started his senior career with Scottish side Gretna, before returning to Newcastle to play in the Northern Premier League for Newcastle Blue Star in August 2007, alongside former Gretna teammates Daniel Lowson, Darren Casson and David Nicholls. He scored a hat-trick for Blue Star in a game against Ossett Albion. Whilst with Blue Star he had unsuccessful trials with Stockport County and Preston North End. He was transfer-listed by his own request in July 2008 after scoring 27 goals in the 2007–08 season. He considered moving to Australia, before he was eventually signed by Conference North side Gateshead for £3,500 plus another player (a 10% sell-on clause was also inserted).

=== Gateshead ===
Novak impressed for Ian Bogie's Gateshead, notably scoring four first-half goals in a 5–2 win over Hyde United at Ewen Fields on 1 November, which included a record breaking three-minute hat-trick. Eighteen days later he claimed another hat-trick in a 3–2 victory over King's Lynn at the Gateshead International Stadium. He was named as the Conference North player of the month in November 2008. Huddersfield Town manager Lee Clark signed Novak in January 2009 after Novak had scored 17 goals in 21 games for Gateshead in the first part of the 2008–09 season; the deal was an initial £50,000, which would rise by another £100,000 if he met appearance targets at Huddersfield. As part of the deal, he returned to Gateshead on loan until the end of the season. Novak agreed to join Huddersfield after resisting numerous approaches by Scunthorpe United manager Nigel Adkins, who made a bid of £90,000.

Novak made a further 17 appearances, scoring 11 goals, and helped Gateshead to the Conference North play-off final. Novak played in the final as winger Wayne Phillips scored the only goal in the 1–0 win over AFC Telford United to promote Gateshead to the Conference Premier. Novak finished the season as top-scorer in the Conference North with 26 league goals. At the end of the season he was voted the club's Player of the Year.

=== Huddersfield Town ===
In July 2009, he gained media attention after being involved with a punch-up with Fabricio Coloccini in a pre-season friendly against Newcastle United. The fight occurred at the end of a what was described as a "feisty game" that Newcastle manager Chris Hughton said demonstrated the "competitiveness" of both sides. He made his debut for Huddersfield as a substitute in a 2–2 draw against Southend United at Roots Hall on 8 August 2009, where he set up the equalising goal. He made his first competitive start three days later in a 3–1 win over Stockport County in the League Cup. On 18 August, he scored his first goal (a penalty) for the "Terriers", in a 7–1 win over Brighton & Hove Albion. He secured a regular place in the starting 11 alongside Jordan Rhodes. He scored in four consecutive League One games from 24 November to 12 December, claiming goals against Swindon Town, Tranmere Rovers, Leeds United, and Gillingham. He suffered a knee injury during a game against Norwich City on 13 March, forcing him to miss Huddersfield's next five games. Novak returned to action with three stoppage time goals in four appearances off the bench including the winning goal against Walsall, a penalty during stoppage time in a 6–0 away win over Stockport County, and a last minute winner over Colchester United in a 2–1 win on 1 May, the last game of the season at the Galpharm Stadium. Novak finished the season with 12 league goals in 38 league games as Huddersfield reached the play-off semi-finals, where they were beaten by Millwall. He was the club's third top-scorer with 14 goals in all competitions, behind Jordan Rhodes (23) and Theo Robinson (16). At the end of the season he signed a contract extension to keep him at the club until summer 2013.

He missed the midpoint of the 2010–11 season with a torn hamstring. He was limited to five goals in 15 starts and 24 substitute appearances, and played both legs of the play-off semi-final victory over Bournemouth, converting his penalty in the shoot-out victory. He was an unused substitute in the play-off final defeat to Peterborough United at Old Trafford; Benik Afobe started the game, whilst strikers Danny Cadamarteri, Jordan Rhodes and Alan Lee all featured as substitutes.

Novak had a full pre-season with no injury problems going into the 2011–12 season. He made his first start of the season in the League Cup First Round 4–2 win over Port Vale at Vale Park on 9 August, scoring twice to help the "Terriers" progress into the next round. Keeping his first team place under the transition of managers from Lee Clark to Simon Grayson, he scored a total of 17 goals in 49 appearances throughout the campaign, and started the play-off final victory over Sheffield United, before being substituted shortly before the penalty shoot-out.

After promotion to the Championship, Novak struggled for form, but did make some telling contributions in the 2012–13 campaign, particularly in the final two games against Bristol City and Barnsley, which helped the club to avoid relegation. He left the club when his contract expired at the end of June 2013, after rejecting a new deal that had been on the table since October 2012.

=== Birmingham City ===
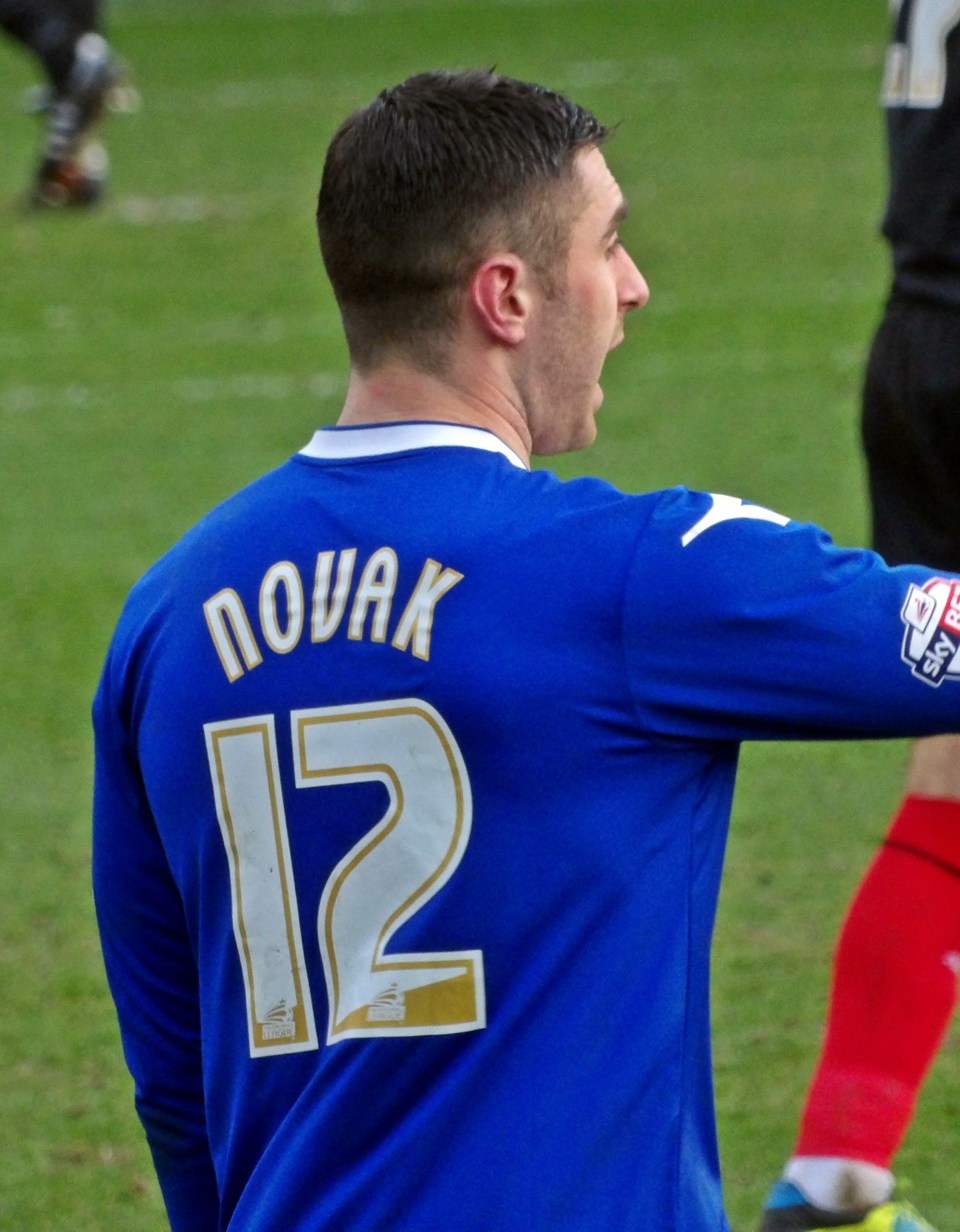
Novak playing for Birmingham City in 2014

In May 2013, Novak agreed a deal to join Birmingham City to reunite himself with his former Huddersfield manager Lee Clark. He scored his first goal in Birmingham colours in a 4–0 defeat of Shamrock Rovers while on pre-season tour in Ireland, and made his competitive debut in a 1–0 defeat at home to Watford on the opening day of the season. Novak was retrospectively awarded his first league goal after being adjudged to have got the last touch on a Nikola Žigić header in a 2–1 defeat to Bolton Wanderers. He was released by Birmingham when his contract expired at the end of the 2015–16 season.

=== Chesterfield ===
Novak joined League One club Chesterfield on a season-long loan on 14 August 2015. He ended his loan with 14 goals from 35 league appearances.

=== Charlton Athletic ===
Novak joined League One club Charlton Athletic on a free transfer on 1 July 2016 after his contract at Birmingham City expired. Novak scored his first goal for the club in a 2–2 draw with Fleetwood Town on 10 September 2016.

=== Scunthorpe United ===
Novak joined another League One club, Scunthorpe United, on 31 August 2017 on a free transfer; he signed a two-year contract.

His contract was extended by Scunthorpe at the end of the 2018–19 season.

=== Bradford City ===
Novak joined League Two club Bradford City on 31 January 2020 on an 18-month contract.

In January 2021 Novak was announced as temporary team captain following injury to regular captain Richard O'Donnell.

On 12 May 2021 he was one of nine players that Bradford City announced would leave the club on 30 June 2021 when their contracts expire.

== Style of play ==
On signing Novak in January 2009, Huddersfield manager Lee Clark said that "he has good awareness and he brings other people into the game. He has a fantastic work ethic... having talked with him he is the type of character that wants to learn and become a better player." Two years later, Clark said he had no problem with asking Novak to play in an unfamiliar role because "his attitude and application are always spot-on". After joining Birmingham, Novak was used on the left wing, in support of a lone striker, as well as in his preferred central position.

== Career statistics ==
As of match played 8 May 2020

Appearances and goals by club, season and competition
Club	Season	League			FA Cup		League Cup		Other		Total	
Club	Season	Division	Apps	Goals	Apps	Goals	Apps	Goals	Apps	Goals	Apps	Goals
Gateshead	2008–09	Conference North	32	26	—		—		6 (Note: Two appearances one goal in Conference League Cup, one appearance in FA Trophy, three appearances one goal in Conference North play-offs)	2	38	28
Huddersfield Town	2009–10	League One	37	12	3	2	1	0	4 (Note: Two appearances in Football League Trophy, two in League One play-offs)	0	45	14
Huddersfield Town	2010–11	League One	31	5	1	0	2	0	5 (Note: Three appearances in Football League Trophy, two in League One play-offs)	0	39	5
Huddersfield Town	2011–12	League One	41	13	1	1	2	2	5 (Note: Two appearances one goal in Football League Trophy, three appearances in League One play-offs)	1	49	17
Huddersfield Town	2012–13	Championship	35	4	3	2	1	0	—		39	6
Huddersfield Town	Total		144	34	8	5	6	2	14	1	172	42
Birmingham City	2013–14	Championship	38	9 (Note: Birmingham's goal in the 2–1 defeat to Bolton Wanderers on 5 October 2013, originally credited to Nikola Žigić, was retrospectively awarded to Novak.)	2	1	3	1	—		43	11
Birmingham City	2014–15	Championship	21	1	2	1	2	0	—		25	2
Birmingham City	2015–16	Championship	0	0	—		1	0	—		1	0
Birmingham City	Total		59	10	4	2	6	1	—		69	13
Chesterfield (loan)	2015–16	League One	35	14	3	1	—		0	0	38	15
Charlton Athletic	2016–17	League One	29	2	3	0	0	0	2 (Note: Appearances in EFL Trophy)	0	34	2
Charlton Athletic	2017–18	League One	2	0	—		1	1	0	0	3	1
Charlton Athletic	Total		31	2	3	0	1	1	2	0	37	3
Scunthorpe United	2017–18	League One	32	6	2	0	—		1	0	35	6
Scunthorpe United	2018–19	League One	43	12	2	1	1	0	1	0	47	13
Scunthorpe United	2019–20	League Two	19	5	1	0	1	0	3	2	24	7
Scunthorpe United	Total		94	23	5	1	2	0	5	2	106	26
Bradford City	2019–20	League Two	6	2	—		—		—		6	2
Bradford City	2020–21	League Two	17	6	0	0	1	1	0	0	18	7
Bradford City	Total		23	8	0	0	1	1	0	0	24	9
Career total			413	114	23	9	16	5	27	5	479	133

== Honours ==
Gateshead

- Conference North play-offs: 2009

Huddersfield Town

- Football League One play-offs: 2012

Individual

- Conference North Player of the Month: November 2008
- Gateshead Player of the Year: 2008–09
