= Tommy Miller =

English footballer (born 1979)

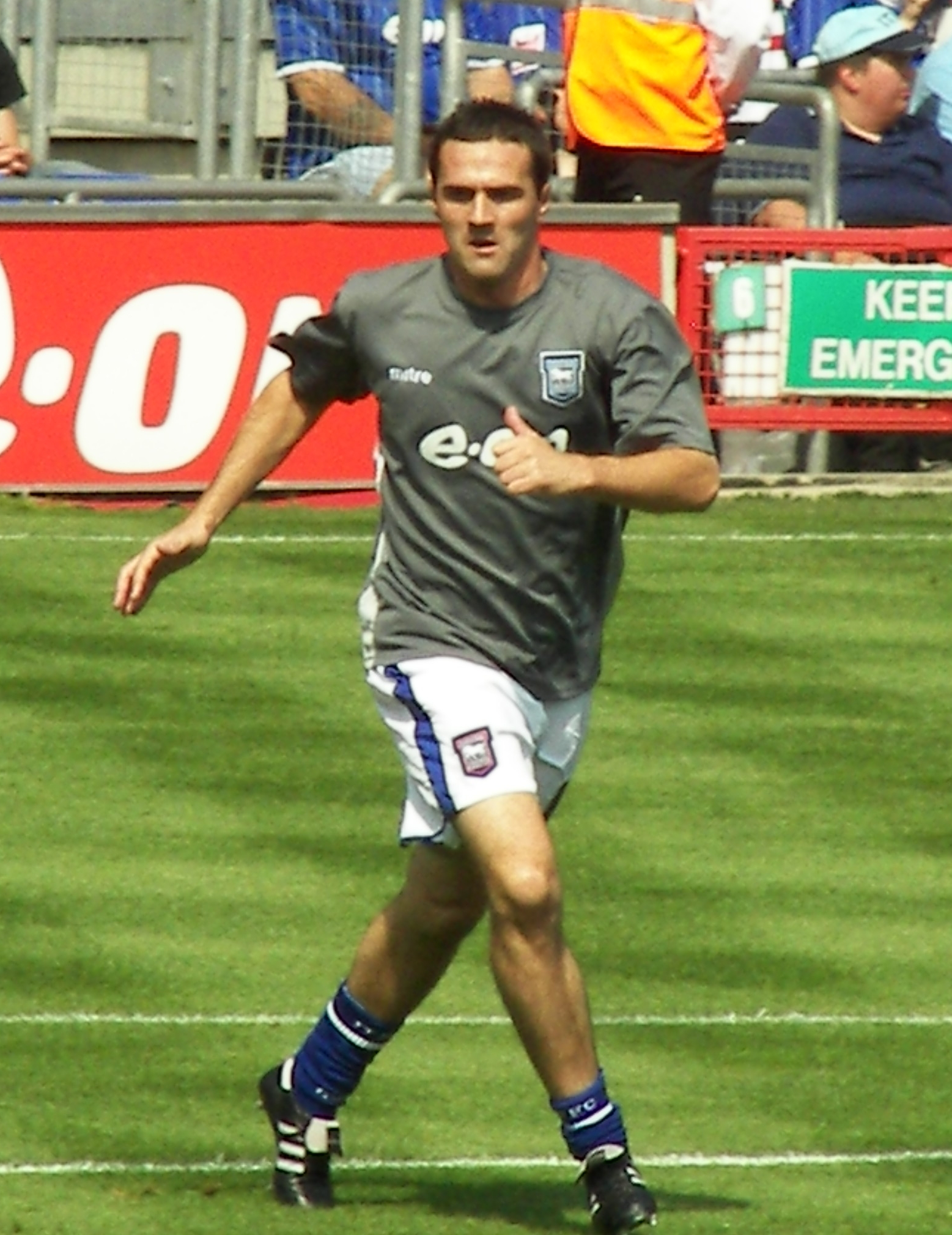
- Miller with Ipswich Town in 2007

Personal information
- Full name: Thomas William Miller
- Date of birth: 8 January 1979 (age 47)
- Place of birth: Shotton Colliery, County Durham, England
- Height: 6 ft 1 in (1.85 m)
- Position: Midfielder

Youth career
- 1992–1994: Ipswich Town
- 1994–1997: Hartlepool United

Senior career*
Years	Team	Apps	(Gls)
1997–2001	Hartlepool United	136	(34)
2001–2005	Ipswich Town	117	(29)
2005–2007	Sunderland	33	(3)
2006	→ Preston North End (loan)	7	(0)
2007–2009	Ipswich Town	69	(10)
2009–2011	Sheffield Wednesday	54	(10)
2011–2012	Huddersfield Town	26	(1)
2012–2013	Swindon Town	34	(1)
2013–2014	Bury	28	(0)
2014–2015	Hartlepool United	15	(0)
2015	FC Halifax Town	1	(0)
2019	Spennymoor Town	0	(0)
Total		520	(88)

Managerial career
- 2013: Swindon Town (joint-caretaker)
- 2020–2021: Spennymoor Town
- 2026: Spennymoor Town
- * Club domestic league appearances and goals

Thomas William Miller (born 8 January 1979) is an English is a professional football manager and former player who played as a midfielder. He is the former manager of Spennymoor Town.

He has previously played for Hartlepool United, Ipswich Town, Sunderland, Preston North End, Sheffield Wednesday, Huddersfield Town, Swindon Town, Bury and FC Halifax Town.

== Playing career ==
=== Hartlepool United ===
Born in Shotton Colliery, County Durham, Miller was in the Ipswich Town youth system as a youngster but was released at 15 and went on to join Hartlepool United, where he signed his first professional deal. After 160 appearances and 41 goals in Division Three, he attracted the interest of several clubs and so left the club in 2001. Before joining Ipswich Town, Miller was close to joining Norwegian side Brann in order to play in the Champions League Campaign on a three-month loan deal. However, Miller's move to Brann was unlikely because FA rules state a player can only join a team outside of Britain for a minimum of three months.

=== Ipswich Town ===
Miller signed back to Ipswich on 12 July 2001 by manager George Burley for £750,000. In his first season at Ipswich Town, he only made eight league appearances and his side was 18th place which resulted relegation to Football League Division One. On 1 November 2001, he made his European cup debut in the UEFA Cup against Swedish side Helsingborg in a 3–1 win. On 25 November 2001, Miller made his league debut for the club in 0–0 draw against Middlesbrough after coming on as a substitute on a 75 minutes for Sixto Peralta. The following season, the club did play in the UEFA Cup again due to UEFA Respect Fair Play ranking where Miller was involved in the First Round against Smederevo and won 2–1 on aggregate.

He then spent four years at Ipswich, scoring 15 goals in 50 appearances in the 2004–05 season and helping them to an unsuccessful Championship play-off appearance. After his last season, Ipswich Town offered Miller a new contract on a two years, only for him to rejected as his contract was set to expire which attracted interests from Premier League and Championship clubs.

=== Sunderland ===
Miller moved to Sunderland in June 2005 on a two-year contract, beating Scottish club Celtic and Leeds United who were chasing after him. On 13 August 2005, he made his debut for the club in a 3–1 loss against Charlton Athletic. On 25 September 2005, he scored his first goal in the Premier League and for Sunderland in a 2–0 win over Middlesbrough, giving their first win in the Premier League since 2002. The next game on 1 October 2005, Miller scored his second goal in a 1–1 draw against West Ham United. It took seven months for Miller to score in a 2–1 loss against Portsmouth on 22 April 2006. However he struggled as they returned to the Championship after just one season, finishing bottom with a record low of 15 points. In his first season, Miller played 29 games in the Premier League and played in the midfield position.

He started the first three games of the season under new manager Niall Quinn, but after the appointment of Roy Keane he found himself sidelined and in the pecking order which led him being loaned to Preston North End. On 28 November 2006, Miller made his debut for the club in a 1–1 draw against Coventry City. On 30 December 2006, Miller played against his parents club in a 1–0 win despite being on loan. On 10 March 2007, Miller made his last appearance for club in a 2–0 win over Barnsley. He was released at the end of the 2006–07 season as Sunderland were promoted to the Premier League again after one season at the Championship.

=== Return to Ipswich Town ===
After being released, Miller was linked to Championship sides Stoke, Coventry and Sheffield Wednesday, League One sides Nottingham Forest and Leeds United, and also SPL side Hearts. Also interested was Romanian side Steaua București who want to sign him with reports claiming that he could discuss a move. However, Miller snub moving to Steaua București in order to stay in England.

On 19 July 2007, Miller started his third spell with Ipswich Town, signing a two-year contract with the Championship club. Ipswich Town were linked signing him last November 2006 on loan but opted to join Preston. On 11 August 2007, Miller made his second debut for the club in a 4–1 win over Sheffield Wednesday. At the start of the 2007–08 season he failed to score many goals but towards the end of the season he scored three in the last six and finished his goal tally for the season on five.

Miller was released by Ipswich on 8 May 2009 along with seven players.

=== Sheffield Wednesday ===
Upon completing the signing of Miller for Sheffield Wednesday manager Brian Laws commented, "I have made it clear that we need to add experience to our squad and Tommy certainly fits the bill. He also has the ability to go with that experience and a massive drive to succeed. I am delighted to welcome him to the club". Miller signed a two-year contract. Previously in December 2001, Sheffield Wednesday made an approach for Miller but rejected by Ipswich Town as Manager Joe Royle wanted to keep Miller. On 15 August 2009, Miller made his debut for the club in a 1–1 draw against Peterborough United. He scored his first goal in a 2–2 draw at Deepdale against Preston North End. Later on the season, Brian Laws left the club after being sacked and went on to take up a Burnley in the Premier League and was succeeded by Alan Irvine. Also, Sheffield Wednesday was relegated on the final game of the season after drawing 2–2 with Crystal Palace.

At the beginning of the 2010–11 season, Miller changed his squad number from 6 to 8. He was named PFA Fans' Player of the Month in League One for October 2010, pipping teammate Nicky Weaver to the award.

On 10 May 2011, Sheffield Wednesday released Miller from his contract. After his release, Miller hit back on Irvine successor Gary Megson for forcing him out of the club and claims that Megson made Miller a promise for a new contract but Megson changed his mind.

=== Huddersfield Town ===
Miller signed a one-year deal with Huddersfield Town on 7 July. Before joining Huddersfield Town, Miller was linked to join Conference National side Gateshead. He made his Terriers debut as a substitute in the 1–1 draw against Bury at the Galpharm Stadium on 6 August 2011.

He scored his first goal for the Terriers in their 2–2 Football League Trophy draw against Bradford City at the Galpharm on 11 October 2011, though he would later miss a penalty in the shootout. His first league goal came in their 2–2 draw against Scunthorpe United at Glanford Park on 25 October 2011.

He left the club in June 2012, after not being offered a new contract by the manager, Simon Grayson.

=== Swindon Town ===
On 21 June 2012, Miller was announced as Swindon Town and manager Paolo Di Canio's latest signing. Miller joined the club on a free transfer penning a one-year deal. He adds significant experience to the squad and joined former Terriers teammate Gary Roberts who signed a few days earlier at The County Ground. Among the clubs interested in signing Miller, was his former club Hartlepool United and had talks with him since his release. He scored his first goal for Swindon on 21 August 2012 against Crawley Town at the County Ground.

On 20 February, following the departure of Paolo Di Canio, Swindon announced that along with Darren Ward, Miller would be taking temporary charge of the squad for the game against Preston on 23 February.

=== Bury ===
On 19 August 2013, Miller joined Bury, with Kevin Blackwell saying "Tommy brings a wealth of experience that is needed at this level. He is excellent on the ball and is one of the key players I have been trying to bring to the Club. He had offers at higher levels but he was very impressed with the new set up here at Gigg Lane. He will be a great asset to the Club."

Miller left Bury at the end of the 2013–14 season when his contract expired.

=== Return to Hartlepool ===
At the end of the 2013–14 season, Miller left Bury to join Hartlepool United under the guide of Colin Cooper. He injured his calf in October 2014 only making one more appearance which was on 28 April 2015, in the 2–1 win against Exeter City which confirmed Hartlepool's Football League status. It was also his 600th career appearance.

== Coaching career ==
After acting as caretaker manager following the departure of Jason Ainsley, Miller was announced as the permanent manager of National League North side Spennymoor Town. Miller was sacked on 5 December 2021 after just seven months in charge, the club sitting 13th in the table.

On 3 May 2023, it was announced that Miller would join recently promoted side South Shields as assistant manager to recently appointed manager Julio Arca. Arca and Miller were dismissed on 27 December 2023 with South Shields in 8th-place in the National League North, following a six-game winless run.

In February 2026, Miller began working in Hartlepool United's academy as the under-16s side's head coach. Later that month, he returned to Spennymoor Town as joint-interim manager alongside Matthew Dolan. In April 2026, Miller took sole charge of the club on a permanent basis. On 2 September 2026, Miller resigned as Spennymoor manager citing an increase in his business commitments outside of the club.

== International recognition ==
Miller was eligible for England and Scotland. After his good form in 2004–05 he was noticed by Scotland manager Berti Vogts, but was unavailable due to injury. This led Miller to hint that he hoped to get a Scottish call up. Miller was named in a friendly squad to face Wales in 2004, but missed out due to an ankle injury.

== Career statistics ==
Appearances and goals by club, season and competition
Club	Season	League			FA Cup		League Cup		Europe		Other		Total	
Club	Season	Division	Apps	Goals	Apps	Goals	Apps	Goals	Apps	Goals	Apps	Goals	Apps	Goals
Hartlepool United	1997–98	Third Division	13	1	0	0	0	0	―		0	0	13	1
Hartlepool United	1998–99	Third Division	34	4	2	1	2	0	―		3 (Note: Appearances in Football League Trophy)	2	41	7
Hartlepool United	1999–2000	Third Division	44	14	2	0	2	1	―		4 (Note: Two appearances in Third Division play-offs, two appearances and one goal in Football League Trophy)	1	52	16
Hartlepool United	2000–01	Third Division	45	15	1	0	2	2	―		6 (Note: Three appearances and one goal in Third Division play-offs, three appearances and two goals in Football League Trophy)	3	54	20
Hartlepool United	Total		136	34	5	1	6	3	―		13	6	160	41
Ipswich Town	2001–02	Premier League	8	0	1	0	2	0	2 (Note: Appearances in UEFA Cup)	0	―		13	0
Ipswich Town	2002–03	First Division	30	6	1	1	2	1	4	2	―		37	10
Ipswich Town	2003–04	First Division	34	10	2	1	1	0	―		2 (Note: Appearances in First Division/Championship play-offs)	0	39	11
Ipswich Town	2004–05	Championship	45	13	1	1	2	1	―		2	0	50	15
Ipswich Town	Total		117	29	5	3	7	2	6	2	4	0	139	36
Sunderland	2005–06	Premier League	29	3	2	0	0	0	―		―		31	3
Sunderland	2006–07	Championship	4	0	0	0	0	0	―		―		4	0
Sunderland	Total		33	3	2	0	0	0	―		―		35	3
Preston North End (loan)	2006–07	Championship	7	0	―		―		―		―		7	0
Ipswich Town	2007–08	Championship	37	5	0	0	1	0	―		―		38	5
Ipswich Town	2008–09	Championship	32	5	2	0	3	1	―		―		37	6
Ipswich Town	Total		69	10	2	0	4	1	0	0	0	0	75	11
Sheffield Wednesday	2009–10	Championship	20	1	0	0	2	0	―		―		22	1
Sheffield Wednesday	2010–11	League One	34	9	3	2	1	0	―		3	0	41	11
Sheffield Wednesday	Total		54	10	3	2	3	0	―		3	0	63	12
Huddersfield Town	2011–12	League One	26	1	1	0	2	0	―		4 (Note: Three appearances in League One play-offs, one appearance and one goal in Football League Trophy)	1	33	2
Swindon Town	2012–13	League One	34	1	0	0	4	0	―		1	0	39	1
Bury	2013–14	League Two	28	0	1	0	1	0	―		0	0	30	0
Hartlepool United	2014–15	League Two	15	0	0	0	1	0	―		1	0	17	0
FC Halifax Town	2015–16	National League	1	0	3	0	―		―		0	0	4	0
Spennymoor Town	2018–19	National League North	0	0	0	0	―		―		0	0	0	0
Career total			520	88	22	6	28	6	6	2	26	7	602	109

== Managerial statistics ==
As of match played 31 August 2026

Managerial record by team and tenure
Team	From	To	Record					Ref.
Team	From	To	P	W	D	L	Win %	Ref.
Swindon Town (joint-caretaker)	20 February 2013	28 February 2013	2	0	1	1	0.0	
Spennymoor Town	10 December 2020	5 December 2021	24	9	6	9	37.5	
Spennymoor Town	23 February 2026	2 September 2026	22	8	7	7	36.4	
Total			48	17	14	17	35.4	—

== Honours ==
Huddersfield Town

- Football League One play-offs: 2012

Individual

- PFA Team of the Year: 1999–2000 Third Division, 2000–01 Third Division
- PFA Fans' League One Player of the Month: October 2010
