= Jack Hunt (footballer) =

English footballer (born 1990)

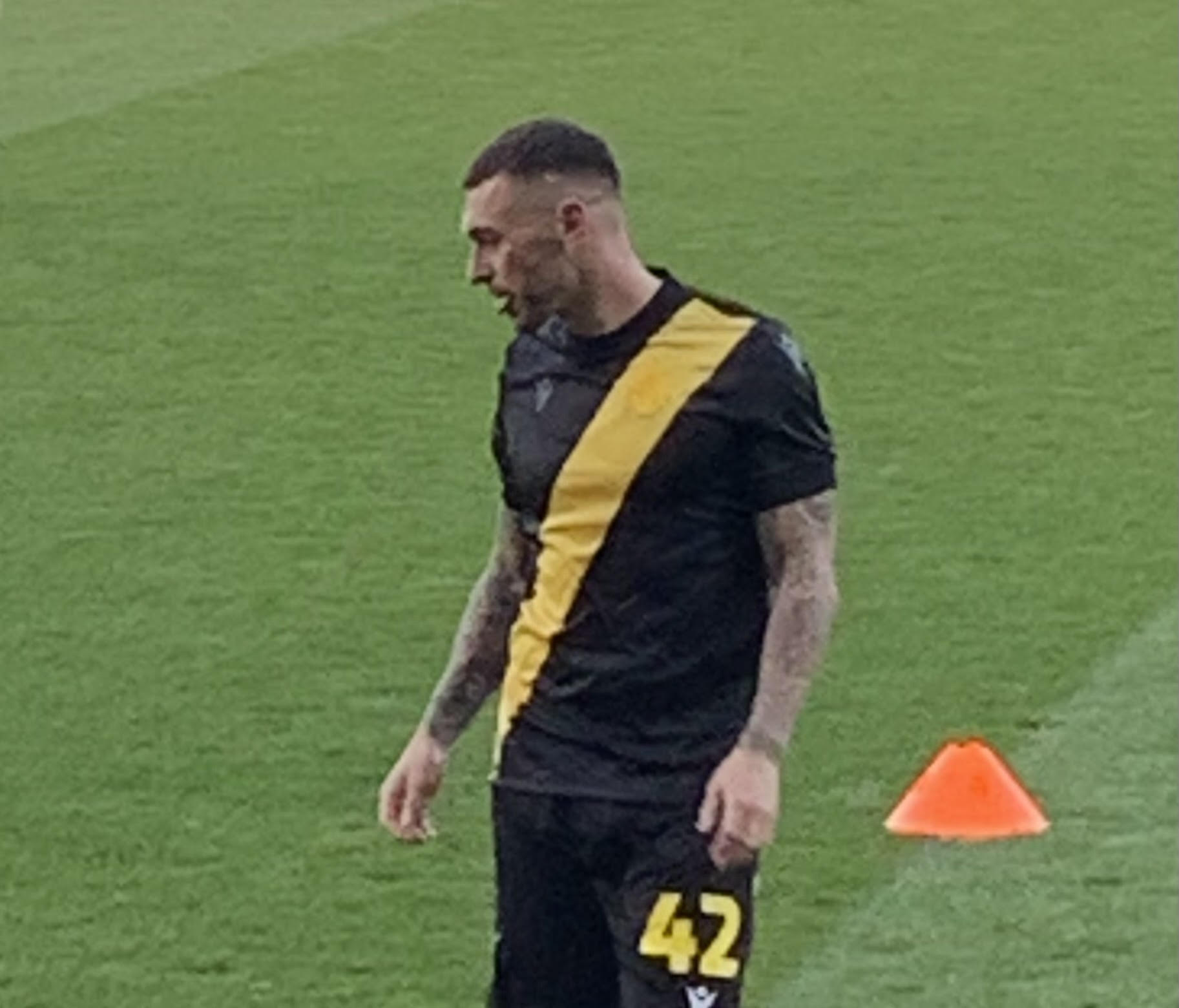
- Hunt at Bristol Rovers in 2023

Personal information
- Full name: Jack Paul Hunt
- Date of birth: 6 December 1990 (age 35)
- Place of birth: Rothwell, West Yorkshire, England
- Height: 5 ft 9 in (1.75 m)
- Positions: Centre-back; right-back

Team information
- Current team: York City
- Number: 32

Youth career
- 1999–2009: Huddersfield Town

Senior career*
Years	Team	Apps	(Gls)
2009–2013	Huddersfield Town	104	(2)
2010	→ Grays Athletic (loan)	4	(0)
2010–2011	→ Chesterfield (loan)	20	(0)
2013–2016	Crystal Palace	0	(0)
2014	→ Barnsley (loan)	11	(0)
2014	→ Nottingham Forest (loan)	17	(0)
2015	→ Rotherham United (loan)	16	(0)
2015–2016	→ Sheffield Wednesday (loan)	15	(0)
2016–2018	Sheffield Wednesday	80	(0)
2018–2021	Bristol City	109	(3)
2021–2023	Sheffield Wednesday	55	(2)
2023–2025	Bristol Rovers	45	(3)
2025–2026	Stockport County	10	(0)
2026	Wigan Athletic	2	(0)
2026–	York City	1	(0)
- * Club domestic league appearances and goals as of 12 September 2026 (UTC)

Jack Paul Hunt (born 6 December 1990) is an English professional footballer who plays as a centre-back or right-back for EFL League Two club York City.

== Career ==
=== Huddersfield Town ===
Having joined up with Huddersfield Town at the age of nine, Hunt went through the club's academy system, starting in May 2008 and signed his first professional contract with the club in April 2009.

Having previously appeared as an unused substitute for Lee Clark's first team on four occasions throughout the 2009–10 season at Huddersfield Town, Hunt signed a contract extension with Huddersfield Town in March 2010.

After his loan spell at Chesterfield came to an end, Hunt made his Huddersfield debut as a substitute in the 0–0 draw against Colchester United at the Galpharm Stadium on 22 January 2011. He then made his first start for the club in their 2–1 defeat to Arsenal at the Emirates Stadium in the Fourth Round of the FA Cup on 30 January 2011, which was then followed by his first league start in the 2–0 win over Carlisle United on 1 February 2011. He scored his first goal for the club against Peterborough United on 9 April 2011, in the last minute to salvage a 1–1 draw. Hunt finished the 2010–11 season, making twenty appearances for the club.

Hunt's first start in the 2011–12 season came against Port Vale in the League Cup on 9 August 2011. He scored with a 25-yard shot to put Huddersfield 3–1 up – they won 4–2 on the night. His first league start of the season came four days later in a 2–2 draw away at Rochdale on 13 August 2011. He scored his first league goal of the 2011–12 season against Leyton Orient on 24 September, he made the score 2–0 with a shot from 20 yards – the game ended 2–2. Due to his overall performance of the course of the season, Hunt, along with his teammate Jordan Rhodes, were voted into the PFA League 1 Team of the Year. Hunt scored his third goal of the season on 12 May 2012, in Huddersfield's play-off semi-final away victory over Milton Keynes Dons at Stadium MK giving Huddersfield a 2–0 win going into the second leg. He then played the full 90minutes plus extra time in the final as Huddersfield Town went on to win promotion after an 8–7 penalty shoot-out win over fellow Yorkshire club Sheffield United with Hunt scoring the 17th penalty of the shootout. Following the club's promotion to the Championship, Hunt signed a one-year contract extension.

Ahead of the 2012–13 season, Hunt began to attracted interests from clubs, such as, Fulham. Hunt made his first start of the season in the opening round of the League Cup in the 2–0 away defeat at Preston North End on Monday 13 August 2012, this was then followed by his first league game of the season away at Cardiff in Huddersfield's first game in the Football League Championship for 11 years in a 1–0 away loss. Hunt gave an impressive display in his first home game of 2012–13 winning an injury time penalty which Jordan Rhodes scored to give Huddersfield a 1–1 draw on 21 August 2012. Hunt was also named in Sky Sports team of the week on 23 August for his performance in Huddersfield first two games of the league campaign. Then, Hunt was given a straight red card and an abusive language towards referee Graham Scott during a 4–0 loss against Millwall and injured his hamstring during a match against Bolton Wanderers on 2 April 2013. After undergoing a successful scan, Hunt returned to the first team and managed to regain in the first team for the 2012–13 season, playing in the left–back position, where he made forty appearances.

The 2013–14 season saw Hunt being linked with a move to Premier League side Sunderland and Swansea City. Also tracking Hunt were Reading, Wigan Athletic and Cardiff City. However, Huddersfield Town revealed there were no enquiries to sign Hunt. Despite this, Hunt remained in the first regular, where he began to play wide right at the start of the season and provided assist one of James Vaughan goals in a 2–1 win over Bradford City in the first round of the League Cup. Once again, Hunt found himself in the transfer speculation, as Crystal Palace made a £2 million bid for Hunt.

=== Loan spells ===
In the 2009–10 season, he was sent on loan to Conference National side Grays Athletic. Hunt made four appearances for Grays Athletic before returning to his parent club.

In the 2010–11 season, Huddersfield manager Lee Clark sent Hunt out on loan to Football League Two side Chesterfield for six months, which lasted until January. Hunt made his debut in the 2–1 win over Barnet on 7 August 2010. Then on 11 September 2010, Hunt provided an assist for Scott Boden to score the equaliser, in a 1–1 draw against Morecambe. Hunt became a first team regular, playing as a right–back, making 20 appearances and returned to the Galpharm after his loan expired in early January 2011.

=== Crystal Palace ===
Premier League side Crystal Palace signed Hunt on a four-year deal, from Huddersfield Town, on 2 September 2013. Upon joining Crystal Palace, Hunt said on the move, quoting: "The interest from Crystal Palace filled me with a lot of confidence. Obviously the Premier is the best league in the world and I jumped at the chance to go to Palace. I spoke to the manager for a good hour, hour-and-a-half and the chat was brilliant, he is a brilliant man and very honest. I can't wait to play for him and you can see why he has such a good team spirit there, and that was only after one conversation with him".

However, before he could make his début, Hunt broke his ankle in training on 9 September, ruling him out for up to four months. By January, Hunt returned to training after being told by the club's medical that he was given all-clear.

After his transfer to Sheffield Wednesday, Hunt said he stood by his decision over signing for Crystal Palace. The Croydon Advertiser later listed Hunt as among eleven players to never live up to expectations.

=== Loan spells ===
On 29 January 2014, Hunt joined Championship side Barnsley on loan for the remainder of the 2013–14 season. Three days later, on 1 February 2014, Hunt made his Barnsley debut, in a 1–0 against Sheffield Wednesday and provided an assist in the next game on 8 February 2014, Hunt provided an assist for Chris O'Grady to score the first goal of the season, in a 2–2 draw against Ipswich Town. However, Hunt was restricted to 10 appearances for the club, due to match fitness and injury that kept him out for the rest of the season. As a result, Hunt was unable to help the club survive relegation, as they were relegated to League One.

On 22 July 2014, Hunt joined Nottingham Forest on loan until 1 January 2015. Upon joining Nottingham Forest, Hunt was given number 17 shirt. On his first day at the club, Hunt appeared at training, but ended up having a head wound, resulting in eight stitches. Hunt made his Nottingham Forest in the opening game of the season against Blackpool, where he provided an assist for Chris Burke, in a 2–0 win. Hunt made an impact at the end of August when he provided an assist for Matty Fryatt to score the winning goal, in a 2–1 win over Bournemouth, and followed up, providing another assist, in a 4–0 win over Reading. Hunt's impact at Nottingham Forest with nineteen appearances had convinced the club's management to express interest in signing him permanently. However, Crystal Palace asked Nottingham Forest to increase their bid for him. This was later confirmed by Palace owner Steve Parish, who stated the club should have signed him permanently and revealed their decision to increase the price to sign Hunt. Hunt's loan spell at Nottingham Forest came to an end on 31 December 2014 and he returned to his parent club. After this, Hunt stated his gratitude to the club, stating the club helped him fall in love with football again.

Despite being linked with a move to Blackburn Rovers, it was announced on 30 January 2015, that Hunt had opted to join Championship club Rotherham United on loan until 2 May 2015. The next day, Hunt made his Rotherham United debut, playing 90 minutes, in a 1–1 draw against Charlton Athletic. Hunt then provided an assist for Kári Árnason to score the first goal of the game, in a 2–0 win over his former club, Huddersfield Town on 7 March 2015. Hunt made sixteen appearances for the club, as he helped them survive relegation in the Championship to ensure playing in the second season.

=== Sheffield Wednesday ===
On 3 July 2015, Hunt joined Championship club Sheffield Wednesday on loan for the duration of the 2015–16 season. Upon joining the club, Hunt was given the number 32 shirt ahead of the new season.

Hunt made his Sheffield Wednesday debut in the opening game of the season, where he played at right-back and for the full 90 minutes, in a 2–0 win over Bristol City. Hunt found himself competing at right-back with Liam Palmer, but managed to retain the position despite suffering from a knee injury.

On 13 January 2016, after playing 22 games as part of his season long loan, Hunt joined Sheffield Wednesday on a three-and-a-half-year deal, signing for an undisclosed fee. Hunt's first game after signing for the club on a permanent basis came on 16 January 2016, in a 2–0 win over Leeds United. A month after joining the club permanently, Hunt provided an assist for Lucas João to score the fourth goal of the season, in a 4–0 win over Brentford on 13 February 2016. Hunt would later help the club reach the play-offs and in the second leg, Hunt provided the assist for Ross Wallace, in a 1–1 draw against Brighton & Hove Albion. Hunt started as a right-back in the play-off Championship Final against Hull City, playing 90 minutes, but lost 1–0. In his first season at the club, Hunt made 40 appearances in all competitions.

=== Bristol City ===
On 6 July 2018, it was announced that Hunt had joined fellow Championship side Bristol City. He joined the Robins for an undisclosed fee, signing a three-year contract.

on 14 May 2021, Hunt left Bristol City following the expiration of his contract thus making him a free agent.

=== Return to Sheffield Wednesday ===
On 22 July 2021, Hunt sealed a return to Sheffield Wednesday. Hunt would confirm he signed a one-year deal with a one-year option based on promotion back to the Championship. He would make his second competitive debut for Sheffield Wednesday on 1 August 2021, at home to former club Huddersfield Town. Hunt would score his first goal for Wednesday across both spells at the club on 26 March 2022 against Cheltenham Town. After missing out on promotion during the playoffs, the club would offer him a new contract following the end of the 2021–22 season, signing a new contract in June 2022.

On 19 May 2023, Hunt scored the winning penalty to send Sheffield Wednesday to the 2023 EFL League One play-off final. Following promotion back to the EFL Championship it was confirmed that Hunt would be released following the end of his contract.

=== Bristol Rovers ===
On 17 August 2023, Hunt signed for League One club Bristol Rovers on a two-year deal. On 23 September 2023, he scored his first goal for the club with the second in a 4–1 victory over Wigan Athletic, a performance rated 9/10 by local journalists.

Having failed to make an appearance since suffering a calf muscle tear on 2 November 2024, new manager Iñigo Calderón revealed in January 2025 that Hunt had since returned to full fitness but had fallen out of favour and there was the possibility of him leaving the club before the end of the transfer window. On 2 February 2025, he made his first appearance in three months, impressing in a 3–1 victory over Peterborough United. Following relegation, he was released at the end of the 2024–25 season.

In July 2025 he joined Bradford City on trial, including joining the club's training camp in Austria.

=== Stockport County ===
On 18 November 2025, Hunt joined League One club Stockport County on a short-term deal until January 2026. He departed the club upon the expiration of his deal in January.

=== Wigan Athletic ===
On 2 February 2026, Hunt joined League One side Wigan Athletic on a deal until the end of the season.

=== York City ===
On 17 July 2026, Hunt signed for EFL League Two club York City.

== Personal life ==
Born in Rothwell, West Yorkshire, England, Hunt said he considered himself a Leeds lad.

== Career statistics ==
As of end of 2025–26 season

Appearances and goals by club, season and competition
Club	Season	League			FA Cup		League Cup		Other		Total	
Club	Season	Division	Apps	Goals	Apps	Goals	Apps	Goals	Apps	Goals	Apps	Goals
Huddersfield Town	2009–10	League One	0	0	0	0	0	0	0	0	0	0
Huddersfield Town	2010–11	League One	19	1	1	0	—		3 (Note: Appearances in League One play-offs)	0	23	1
Huddersfield Town	2011–12	League One	43	1	0	0	2	1	5 (Note: Three appearances and one goal in League One play-offs, two in Football League Trophy)	1	50	3
Huddersfield Town	2012–13	Championship	40	0	3	0	1	0	—		44	0
Huddersfield Town	2013–14	Championship	2	0	—		2	0	—		4	0
Huddersfield Town	Total		104	2	4	0	5	1	8	1	121	4
Grays Athletic (loan)	2009–10	Conference Premier	4	0	—		—		—		4	0
Chesterfield (loan)	2010–11	League Two	20	0	—		1	0	2 (Note: Appearances in Football League Trophy)	0	23	0
Crystal Palace	2013–14	Premier League	0	0	0	0	—		—		0	0
Crystal Palace	2014–15	Premier League	0	0	0	0	—		—		0	0
Crystal Palace	2015–16	Premier League	0	0	—		—		—		0	0
Crystal Palace	Total		0	0	0	0	—		—		0	0
Barnsley (loan)	2013–14	Championship	11	0	—		—		—		11	0
Nottingham Forest (loan)	2014–15	Championship	17	0	—		2	0	—		19	0
Rotherham United (loan)	2014–15	Championship	16	0	—		—		—		16	0
Sheffield Wednesday	2015–16	Championship	34	0	0	0	3	0	3 (Note: Appearances in Championship play-offs)	0	40	0
Sheffield Wednesday	2016–17	Championship	32	0	0	0	0	0	2	0	34	0
Sheffield Wednesday	2017–18	Championship	29	0	4	0	1	0	—		34	0
Sheffield Wednesday	Total		95	0	4	0	4	0	5	0	108	0
Bristol City	2018–19	Championship	33	1	1	0	1	0	—		35	1
Bristol City	2019–20	Championship	35	0	1	0	1	1	—		37	1
Bristol City	2020–21	Championship	41	2	1	0	1	0	—		43	2
Bristol City	Total		109	3	3	0	3	1	—		115	4
Sheffield Wednesday	2021–22	League One	39	2	1	0	1	0	5 (Note: Appearance(s) in League One Play-offs & Football League Trophy)	0	46	2
Sheffield Wednesday	2022–23	League One	16	0	5	0	0	0	5	0	26	0
Sheffield Wednesday	Total		55	2	6	0	1	0	10	0	72	2
Bristol Rovers	2023–24	League One	25	3	2	0	0	0	0	0	27	3
Bristol Rovers	2024–25	League One	20	0	1	0	0	0	0	0	21	0
Bristol Rovers	Total		45	3	3	0	0	0	0	0	48	3
Stockport County	2025–26	League One	10	0	1	0	0	0	2	0	13	0
Wigan Athletic	2025–26	League One	2	0	1	0	0	0	0	0	3	0
York City	2026–27	League Two	0	0	0	0	0	0	0	0	0	0
Career total			488	10	22	0	16	2	27	1	553	12

== Honours ==
Chesterfield

- Football League Two: 2010–11

Huddersfield Town

- Football League One play-offs: 2012

Sheffield Wednesday

- EFL League One play-offs: 2023

Individual

- PFA Team of the Year: 2011–12 League One
- Huddersfield Town Young Player of the Season: 2011–12
