= Oscar Gobern =

English footballer

Personal information
- Full name: Oscar Lee Gobern
- Date of birth: 26 January 1991 (age 35)
- Place of birth: Birmingham, England
- Height: 5 ft 11 in (1.80 m)
- Position: Midfielder

Youth career
- Aston Villa
- –2008: Southampton

Senior career*
Years	Team	Apps	(Gls)
2008–2011	Southampton	21	(1)
2009	→ Milton Keynes Dons (loan)	2	(0)
2011–2015	Huddersfield Town	71	(3)
2014	→ Chesterfield (loan)	3	(0)
2015–2016	Queens Park Rangers	0	(0)
2015	→ Doncaster Rovers (loan)	5	(0)
2016–2017	Mansfield Town	9	(0)
2017	Ross County	0	(0)
2017–2018	Yeovil Town	11	(0)
2018–2019	Eastleigh	44	(1)
2019–2021	Dover Athletic	35	(1)
2021–2023	Havant & Waterlooville	41	(1)

International career
2009	England U19	1	(0)
- * Club domestic league appearances and goals as of 16:52, 10 Sep 2024 (UTC)

Oscar Lee Gobern (born 26 January 1991) is an English footballer who plays as a midfielder, most recently for Havant & Waterlooville.

He played at EFL Championship level for Southampton, Huddersfield Town and Queens Park Rangers, as well as playing in the Scottish Premiership with Ross County. He also played in the Football League for Milton Keynes Dons, Chesterfield, Doncaster Rovers, Mansfield Town and Yeovil Town, before moving into non-league football with Eastleigh, Dover Athletic and Havant & Waterlooville. He has been capped once by the England U19s.

== Career ==
=== Southampton ===
Gobern was born in Birmingham and joined the Southampton F.C. Academy after a brief spell with Aston Villa. He made his league début as a substitute at Deepdale against Preston North End on 1 November 2008, as the "Saints" came from 2–0 down to claim a 3–2 victory.

After making seven appearances the season earlier, Gobern made his first appearance of the 2009–10 season in a 1–1 draw with Millwall, making a further two appearances for the Saints before, on 17 September, he was loaned out to fellow League One side Milton Keynes Dons on a one-month deal, making his debut as a 24th-minute substitute against Walsall on 14 October. After the match, manager Paul Ince commented "We had a young lad in Oscar Gobern playing left-back, who I thought did a fantastic job." Gobern also made a brief appearance as an 89th-minute substitute against Gillingham on 17 October, when he played alongside his elder brother, Lewis, for the first time in a professional match, before returning to Southampton after making just two appearances for the Dons. He went on to make a further four appearances for the Saints that season.

Gobern's first goal in his professional career came in the 87th minute for Southampton against Cheltenham Town, in the FA Cup second round on 27 November 2010. He received his first professional red card in a 3–1 victory at Bournemouth. His first professional league goal for Southampton came on 30 April 2011 in stoppage time of a 3–0 victory at Brentford. Gobern made a total of 13 appearances for Nigel Adkins' side during the 2010–11 season as the Saints gained automatic promotion to the Football Championship, with Gobern's scoring two goals.

=== Huddersfield Town ===
On 19 June 2011, it was announced that Gobern was set to join League One club Huddersfield Town, having failed to agree a new deal at Southampton when his contract expired at the conclusion of the 2010–11 season. He signed a two-year deal with the Terriers on 1 July, and his compensation fee was decided by a tribunal on 5 September 2011 as £275,000, rising to £400,000 on appearances. He made his debut in a 1–1 draw against Bury at the Galpharm Stadium on 6 August 2011. His first goal for the Terriers came in the 3–0 win over Sheffield United at Brammall Lane on 13 September 2011. Gobern scored his second goal of the season in the club's 6–0 thrashing of Wycombe Wanderers away in January 2012, with teammate Jordan Rhodes scoring the other five. Gobern made 21 league appearances in 2011–12, scoring twice, and made a total of 25 appearances in all competitions. He helped Huddersfield secure promotion to the Championship, as the club finished the season as League One play-off winners, beating Sheffield United at Wembley Stadium.

In 2012–13, Gobern's season was disrupted by injury, with him not featuring for the Terriers until late February 2013. However, he became a key part of the side that avoided relegation and was subsequently offered a new 3-year deal, which he accepted, keeping him at the club until the summer of 2016.

Having become out of favour at Huddersfield, on 23 October 2014, Gobern joined Chesterfield on an initial one-month loan deal. The loan was ended early on 12 November.

=== Queens Park Rangers ===
On 6 August 2015, Gobern signed a one-year deal with Queens Park Rangers following a successful trial period. On 12 August 2015, Gobern made his competitive QPR debut in a 3–0 win away to Yeovil Town in the first round of the 2015–16 Football League Cup, starting the game before being replaced by Junior Hoilett.

=== Mansfield Town ===
Gobern signed for Mansfield Town in September 2016.

=== Ross County ===
On 20 January 2017, Gobern signed for Scottish Premiership club Ross County until the end of the 2016–17 season. He left at the end of the season, making only one appearance as a substitute in the Scottish Cup against Aberdeen.

=== Yeovil Town ===
On 1 December 2017, Gobern signed for Yeovil Town until the end of the season. He was offered a new contract by Yeovil at the end of the 2017–18 season.

=== Eastleigh ===
On 14 June 2018, Gobern rejected Yeovil's offer of a new contract and instead signed for National League side Eastleigh on a one-year deal.

=== Dover Athletic ===
On 6 June 2019, Gobern joined Dover Athletic on a two-year deal from 1 July. Following's Dover's decision to not play any more matches in the 2020–21 season, made in late January, and subsequent null and voiding of all results, on 5 May 2021 it was announced that Gobern was out of contract and had left the club.

=== Havant & Waterlooville ===
In August 2021, Gobern joined National League South side Havant & Waterlooville, linking up with former-Dover teammates Josh Passley and Paul Rooney who had both also joined the club that summer.

== International career ==
Gobern has represented the country of his birth, England, at international level, having been capped by England's under-19 side in 2009, during his time at Southampton. He was called up for a friendly match against Russia Under-19s at Shrewsbury Town's ProStar Stadium in September 2009. He made his début in the match, coming on as a substitute in the 60th minute in a 2–1 victory over Russia, in what is his only appearance at international level.

== Personal life ==
Gobern is the younger brother of fellow professional footballer Lewis Gobern, who retired in 2011.

== Career statistics ==
As of 5 May 2021

Appearances and goals by club, season and competition
Club	Season	League			National Cup		League Cup		Other		Total	
Club	Season	Division	Apps	Goals	Apps	Goals	Apps	Goals	Apps	Goals	Apps	Goals
Southampton	2008–09	Championship	6	0	1	0	0	0	—		7	0
Southampton	2009–10	League One	4	0	2	0	1	0	0	0	7	0
Southampton	2010–11	League One	11	1	2	1	0	0	0	0	13	2
Southampton	Total		21	1	5	1	1	0	0	0	27	2
Milton Keynes Dons (loan)	2009–10	League One	1	0	—		—		—		1	0
Huddersfield Town	2011–12	League One	21	2	0	0	2	0	2 (Note: Appearances in Football League Trophy)	0	25	2
Huddersfield Town	2012–13	Championship	15	0	1	0	1	0	—		17	0
Huddersfield Town	2013–14	Championship	23	0	1	0	1	0	—		25	0
Huddersfield Town	2014–15	Championship	12	1	0	0	0	0	—		12	1
Huddersfield Town	Total		71	3	2	0	4	0	2	0	79	3
Chesterfield (loan)	2014–15	League One	3	0	—		—		0	0	3	0
Queens Park Rangers	2015–16	Championship	0	0	0	0	2	0	—		2	0
Doncaster Rovers (loan)	2015–16	League One	5	0	—		—		0	0	5	0
Mansfield Town	2016–17	League Two	9	0	0	0	0	0	2 (Note: Appearance(s) in EFL Trophy)	0	11	0
Ross County	2016–17	Scottish Premiership	0	0	1	0	0	0	—		1	0
Yeovil Town	2017–18	League Two	11	0	1	0	0	0	2	0	14	0
Eastleigh	2018–19	National League	44	1	1	0	—		0	0	45	1
Dover Athletic	2019–20	National League	24	1	1	0	—		0	0	25	1
Dover Athletic	2020–21	National League	11	0	1	0	—		0	0	12	0
Dover Athletic	Total		35	1	2	0	—		0	0	37	1
Career total			200	6	11	1	7	0	6	0	225	7

== Honours ==
Southampton

- Football League One runner-up: 2010-11

Huddersfield Town

- Football League One play-offs: 2012
