= Jamie McCombe =

English footballer (born 1983)

Personal information
- Full name: Jamie Paul McCombe
- Date of birth: 1 January 1983 (age 43)
- Place of birth: Pontefract, England
- Position: Defender

Youth career
- 1996–1999: Frickley Athletic
- 1999–2002: Scunthorpe United

Senior career*
Years	Team	Apps	(Gls)
2001–2004	Scunthorpe United	63	(2)
2003–2004	→ Halifax Town (loan)	7	(1)
2004–2006	Lincoln City	87	(7)
2006–2010	Bristol City	119	(9)
2010–2012	Huddersfield Town	54	(8)
2011–2012	→ Preston North End (loan)	6	(0)
2012–2015	Doncaster Rovers	53	(2)
2015–2016	Stevenage	14	(0)
2016–2020	Lincoln City	15	(2)

Managerial career
- 2019: Lincoln City (caretaker)
- * Club domestic league appearances and goals as of 14:04, 23 January 2020 (UTC)

Jamie Paul McCombe (born 1 January 1983) is an English professional footballer who last played for Lincoln City.

== Career ==
=== Frickley Athletic ===
Jamie McCombe played youth team football for Frickley Athletic in South Elmsall, West Yorkshire between 1996 and 1999 before signing for Scunthorpe United youth team terms.

=== Scunthorpe United ===
McCombe began his career as a trainee with Scunthorpe United. He made his debut during the third year of his training scheme when he scored the third goal in a 3–0 defeat of Darlington in a Football League Trophy tie on 30 October 2001. He made his Football League debut in the 4–1 victory over Leyton Orient on 3 November 2001 and, after just three league appearances, was offered a 2 1/2-year professional contract. He made 17 league appearances in his debut season before being named Scunthorpe's young player of the season: he began to attract the attention of scouts from clubs at a higher level, enjoying a one-day trial with Aston Villa where he played for Villa against Shrewsbury Town in Malcolm Starkey's testimonial match on 2 May 2002.

He continued his progress the following season, making 31 league appearances as Scunthorpe reached the play-offs. After starting the 2003–2004 season in the first team, McCombe lost his place at the end of September and, at the end of October, linked up with Halifax Town on loan. He scored on his debut in the 3–0 victory over Dagenham & Redbridge on 1 November 2003 and made seven league appearances for the Shaymen before being recalled to Scunthorpe in December. In January 2004, it seemed as if he would be allowed to leave Glanford Park on a free transfer and he agreed terms to join Lincoln City at the beginning of February, only for the deal to be blocked. Five weeks after initially agreeing terms, a Football League tribunal ruled that McCombe could join Lincoln once they had given Scunthorpe seven days notice of their intentions, and he joined the Imps on a contract initially lasting until the end of the 2003–2004 season. As part of the deal, McCombe had to sign a confidentiality agreement with the Football League preventing him from discussing the details of the transfer.

=== Lincoln City ===
He moved to Lincoln City on a free transfer in March 2004.

=== Bristol City ===
==== 2006–07 ====
He joined Bristol City in May 2006. McCombe made his debut for Bristol City on 5 August 2006 in a 1–0 win over former club Scunthorpe United coming on as a 71st-minute substitute for Phil Jevons, his first start for the club came on 21 September 2006 in a 2–1 win over Leyton Orient where he played the full 90 minutes.

McCome scored his first goal for the club in a 1–1 draw away at Brentford on 7 October 2006; he scored his second in a 1–0 away win over York City in the FA Cup. McCombe went on to make 49 appearances in all competitions for Bristol City with 41 of them coming in the League, also went on to score 6 goals in all with 4 coming in the League during the 2006/07 season.

Bristol City won promotion to the Football League Championship in his first season with the club after finishing second in the league and McCombe was voted the club's Player of the Season.

==== 2007–08 ====
McCombe did not make his first appearance of the 2007–08 season until October coming on as a 66-minute substitute in a 2–0 home win over Sheffield United on 6 October 2007. His first start did not come until 24 October in a 2–0 home loss to Leicester City.

He scored his first goal of the season in a 1–1 draw at home to Crystal Palace on 18 February 2008, he then went on to score two games in a row with the first (a spectacular bicycle kick) coming against Hull City in a 2–1 win on 1 March 2008, and then in a 1–1 draw away at Charlton Athletic on 4 March 2008. McCombe made 36 league appearances scoring 3 goals during the 2007/08 season as Bristol made the 2008 Championship Play-Off final where he played in both semi final wins over Crystal Palace but missed the final when Bristol City lost out to Hull City.

==== 2008–09 ====
McCombe made his first start on the opening day of the season in a 1–0 away win over Blackpool. He scored his first league goal of the campaign in a 1–0 home win over Norwich City on 18 October 2008. McCombe only made 28 league appearances, scoring just once for Bristol City during the 2008–09 season, with a further two starts coming in the FA Cup both against Portsmouth.

==== 2009–10 ====
McCombe only managed 13 league starts with a further three coming off the bench during the 2009–10 season, his lowest number of matches since joining the club in 2006. He also made one substitution appearance in the League Cup. His first start of the season came in the controversial 1–0 win over Crystal Palace on 15 August 2009. He went on to start the next seven league games. McCombe made his last appearance of the season in a 3–1 away win over Leicester City where he came on as an 82nd-minute substitute on 8 December 2009.

=== Huddersfield Town ===
==== 2010–11 ====
After being told by new Bristol City manager Steve Coppell that he was not in his plans, McCombe left Ashton Gate to join Football League One side Huddersfield Town, a club where his brother John played as a centre back in the early 2000s (decade), becoming manager Lee Clark's second signing in as many days, following the arrival of Lee Croft from Derby County on a six-month loan and sixth signing of the pre-season.

He made his Terriers debut in the 3–0 win over Notts County at Meadow Lane on 7 August 2010. He scored his first goal for the Terriers in the 3–1 win over Charlton Athletic at the Galpharm Stadium on 28 August 2010.

==== Preston (loan) ====
On 24 November 2011, he joined fellow League One side Preston North End on loan until 2 January 2012. On 22 December, it was announced that Huddersfield had terminated the loan, but the next day it was revealed that the loan contract didn't include a recall clause, so he remained at Deepdale, before eventually returning at the original date.

McCombe's first appearance on his return to Huddersfield was a 6–0 away victory at Wycombe Wanderers on 6 January 2012, he made a total of 20 appearances for Huddersfield during the 2012 season as Huddersfield finished the season as Play-off champions winning promotion to the Championship after beating Sheffield United on penalties in the Wembley final.

=== Doncaster Rovers ===
On 11 August 2012, his contract at Huddersfield was terminated, and later in the day, he joined Doncaster Rovers.

He went on trial at Bradford City in July 2015.

=== Return to Lincoln City ===
On 28 January 2016, following his Doncaster release, McCombe returned to Lincoln City. On 28 May 2020, it was announced McCombe will leave the club at the end of his current contract.

== Coaching career ==
On 21 October 2016, McCombe accepted the role of the player-coach at Lincoln. On 18 May 2017, it was announced McCombe had accepted a coaching role at Lincoln City, effectively ending his playing career. When Danny Cowley left to manage Huddersfield Town, McCombe was appointed caretaker manager at Lincoln.

== Personal life ==
His younger brother John is also a professional football defender, who also played for Huddersfield Town.

== Managerial statistics ==
As of 21 September 2019

Managerial record by team and tenure
Team	From	To	Record					Ref.
Team	From	To	P	W	D	L	Win %	Ref.
Lincoln City	9 September 2019	21 September 2019	3	0	1	2	0.0	
Total			3	0	1	2	0.0	

== Honours ==
Doncaster Rovers

- Football League One: 2012–13
