= Gary Roberts (footballer, born 1984) =

English footballer

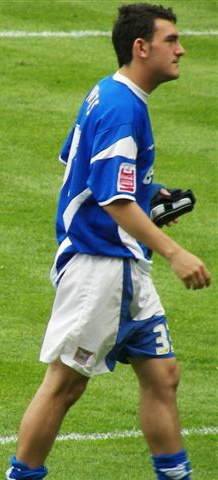
- Roberts playing for Ipswich Town in 2007

Personal information
- Full name: Gareth Michael Roberts
- Date of birth: 18 March 1984 (age 42)
- Place of birth: Liverpool, England
- Position: Attacking midfielder

Team information
- Current team: Chesterfield (first team coach)

Youth career
- 2000–2001: Liverpool
- 2001–2002: Denbigh Town
- 2002–2003: Bala Town

Senior career*
Years	Team	Apps	(Gls)
2003	Rhyl	2	(0)
2003–2004	Bangor City	22	(1)
2004–2005	Welshpool Town	20	(9)
2005–2007	Accrington Stanley	64	(23)
2006	→ Ipswich Town (loan)	14	(2)
2007–2008	Ipswich Town	40	(2)
2008	→ Crewe Alexandra (loan)	4	(0)
2008–2012	Huddersfield Town	162	(31)
2012–2013	Swindon Town	39	(4)
2013–2015	Chesterfield	74	(17)
2015–2017	Portsmouth	74	(17)
2017–2020	Wigan Athletic	54	(3)
2020–2021	Bala Town	4	(1)
2021	Accrington Stanley	2	(0)
Total		575	(110)

International career
2005–2006	England C	4	(0)
- * Club domestic league appearances and goals as of 2 March 2021 (GMT)

Gareth Michael Roberts (born 18 March 1984) is an English professional football coach and former player, who is a first-team coach at EFL League Two side Chesterfield.

Roberts has played in both the English football league system (playing in the Football League and Conference) as well as playing in the Welsh Premier League, and has played in all three divisions of the Football League. Roberts was capped four times for England C when playing at semi-professional level.

== Club career ==
=== Early career ===
Born in Liverpool, Roberts begin his career with the Liverpool Academy but was dropped in 2001. He then went on to play for the youth teams at two Welsh clubs Denbigh Town and Bala Town. He then went on to play first team football for three Welsh clubs. Signing for Rhyl in 2003 where he played three times before moving on to Welsh Premier League side Bangor City where he played 22 times scoring once between 2003 and 2004. He then moving to Welshpool Town for the 2004–2005 season where he played 20 times scoring nine goals.

=== Accrington Stanley ===
Roberts signed for Conference National side Accrington Stanley in the second half of the 2004–05 season. He made his Stanley debut in their 2–1 home win over Morecambe on 19 March 2005. His first goal for them came in their 2–2 home draw with York City on 28 March 2005.

He made his first start of the 2005–06 season in their 1–0 home victory over Canvey Island on the opening day of the season. Roberts scored his first goal of the 2005–06 season in Stanley's 4–2 win over Crawley Town on 17 September 2005. Roberts was part of the Accrington Stanley side that won the 2005–06 Conference National Championship after playing 42 league games scoring 13 goals.

Roberts played his first game of the 2006–07 season for Stanley in on the opening day of the season in Stanley's 2–0 away defeat to Chester City. His first goal of the season came in their 1–1 home draw with Rochdale on 26 August 2006. Roberts was then loaned out to Football League Championship side Ipswich Town, after making 14 league appearances and scoring eight times for Stanley in the 2006–07 season. The loan move was made permanent in the January transfer window of the same season.

=== Ipswich Town ===
He moved to Ipswich Town on loan from Accrington Stanley in October 2006. He made his debut in 3–2 loss at home to Preston North End on 17 October 2006. He scored his first goal for Ipswich against Derby County in November 2006. He played 14 times scoring two goals during his loan spell there, impressing enough to earn a permanent four-year deal with the club in January 2007.

He started the 2007–08 season with a goal in the 4–1 win over Sheffield Wednesday but seen lost his place in the side having to settle for coming on as a substitute of being left on the bench.

On 12 February 2008, Roberts joined League One side Crewe Alexandra on a one-month loan, joining another Gary Roberts at the club. He made his first appearances for the club in their 1–0 win over Leyton Orient on 12 February 2008. Roberts made four appearances for Crewe before returning to Ipswich in March. Roberts played an extra three matches for Ipswich before the end of the season, bringing his season total to 21 for the 2007–08 season with only 10 being start and 11 coming off the bench.

Roberts then left Ipswich in August 2008 to join League one side Huddersfield Town after making 44 appearances scoring four times in the league between 2006 and 2008.

=== Huddersfield Town ===
At the end of the 2007–08 season, Roberts was transfer listed and joined Huddersfield Town on 29 July 2008 for a fee of around £250,000.

==== 2008–09 season ====
He along with five other players made his Huddersfield Town debut in the 1–1 draw against Stockport County at the Galpharm Stadium on 9 August 2008. On 12 August, he scored his first two goals in the 4–0 win against local rivals Bradford City in the first round of the League Cup to send Huddersfield through to the second round. His first league goal for Huddersfield was a consolation goal in their 3–1 defeat by Milton Keynes Dons on 23 August 2008.

On 25 April 2009, he won three awards at the club's Player of the Year Awards. He won the Best Goal for his goal against Hereford United in December, the Fan's Players of the Season and the Player's Player of the Season awards. As well as being top goal scorer with 11 goals in all competitions.

Roberts signed a new three-year deal with Huddersfield Town on 2 July 2009.

==== 2009–10 season ====
Roberts made his first start of the 2009–10 season in Huddersfield's 2–2 opening day draw away at Southend United, he scored his first goal of the 2009–10 season for the Terriers in their 7–1 home win over Brighton & Hove Albion.

Town won by a four or more goal margin on five occasion when Roberts scored in the 2009–10 season including a 7–1 win over Brighton & Hove Albion in August, a 4–0 win over Leyton Orient in October, two goals in Towns 6–1 FA Cup win over Dagenham & Redbridge in November, one week later in their 6–0 thumping of Wycombe Wanderers as well as in their 6–0 away win at Stockport County in April 2010.

Roberts was given a retrospective red card after Town's game with Bristol Rovers forcing him to miss the Terriers' next three games. He also scored an 85-minute equalizing goal over Huddersfield Town's local rivals Leeds United. He also retained his Fan's Player of the Season award as well as picking up the Blue & White Foundation Player of the Season award. Roberts finished the season with 45 games in all competitions for Town and scoring nine goals making him joint third with Anthony Pilkington in Huddersfield's top scores table for 2009–10 with seven of his goals coming in the league.

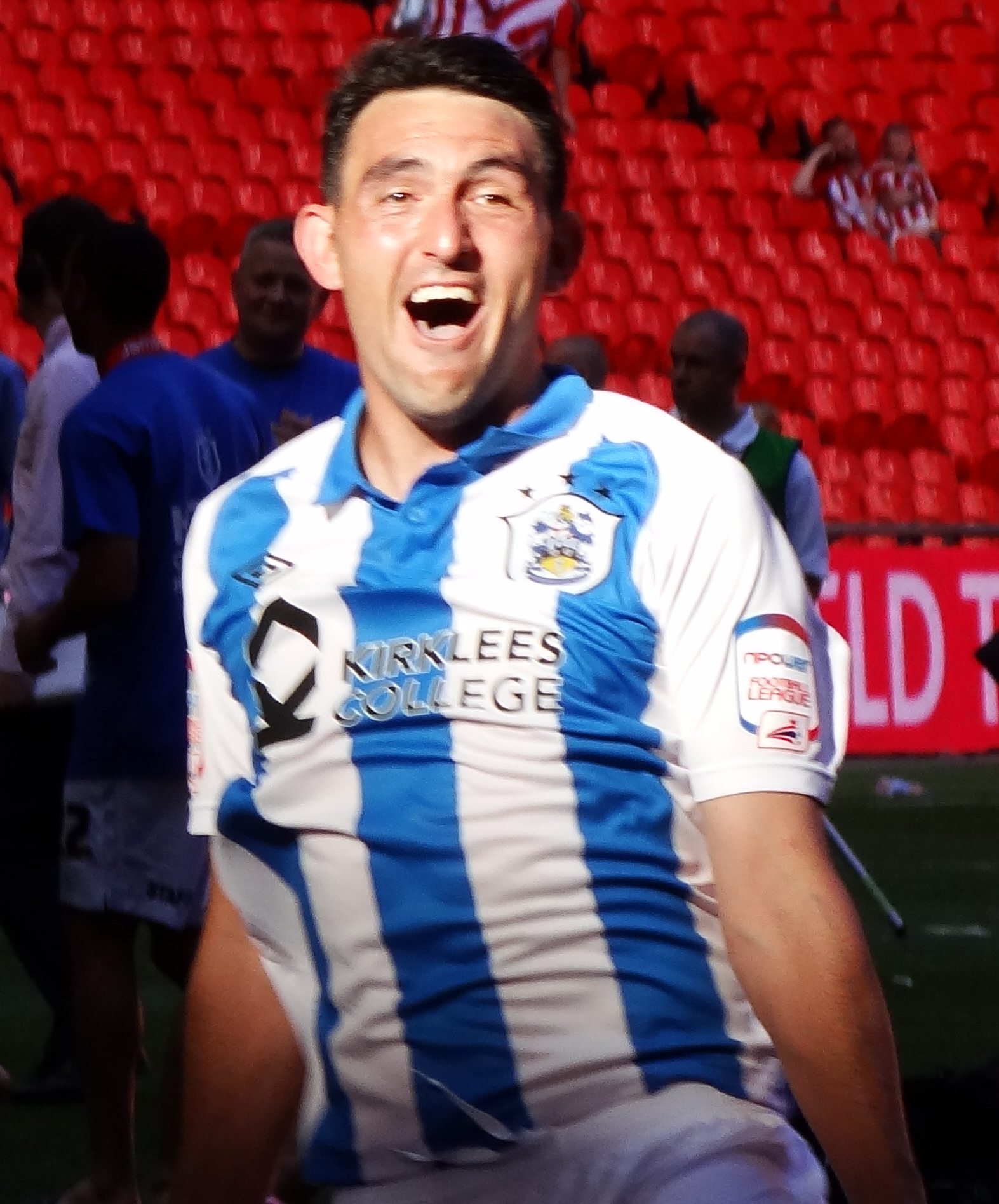
Roberts celebrates winning the play-off final with Huddersfield in 2012

==== 2011–12 season ====
At the start of the 2011–12 season, Roberts rejected a new contract at the club, however he made his first appearance of the season on the opening day scoring in the 1–1 draw at home to Bury on 6 August 2011, with his second coming in the first round of the League Cup just three days later on 9 August 2011 in a 4–2 away win over Port Vale.

He left the club in June 2012, after not being offered a new contract by the manager, Simon Grayson.

=== Swindon Town ===
Roberts signed for Swindon Town on 18 June 2012 and was included in their pre-season tour of Italy. On 19 February 2013, during a game against Tranmere Rovers, Roberts scored a contender for goal of the season: a 70-yard strike lobbed over the Tranmere goalkeeper from Swindon's own half.

=== Chesterfield ===
Roberts signed for League Two club Chesterfield on a three-year contract on 22 June 2013. Roberts scored his first goal for the Spireites during a 2–0 win over Cheltenham on his home debut, going on to become a popular figure among Chesterfield's fan base. He also drew admiring glances from opposition managers, with Rochdale manager Keith Hill describing Roberts as "The best player in the league" after his goal and assist against 'the dale'. He continued his form throughout the month of August, scoring 3 goals in six games as Chesterfield climbed to the top of the table, which saw Roberts named League Two player of the month, along with manager Paul Cook. Roberts received his first red card for the Spireites against arch-rivals Mansfield Town in a 1–0 defeat. Roberts returned from his suspension in the midst of Chesterfield's worst run of the season, four matches without a win, until he scored in the home victory against Daventry Town in a 2–0 FA Cup win. Roberts scored twice against Oxford United on 15 March, and later that evening travelled to London for the Football League Awards in which he won League Two Player of the Year, beating Scott Hogan and Sam Winnall to win the prize. After defeating Fleetwood Town over two legs in the Football League Trophy area final, Roberts had the chance to play at Wembley Stadium for the second time in three years, however the Spireites succumbed to and 3–1 defeat by Peterborough United.

=== Portsmouth ===
On 17 June 2015 Roberts joined Portsmouth on a three-year deal, stating that manager Paul Cook, Roberts' manager at Chesterfield, was the main reason for him signing for the club. On 22 August 2015, he scored a free kick and one further goal at home against Morecambe to rescue a point in a 3–3 comeback. In the 2016–17 season he scored twice in the second home game of the season against Colchester, one of which was a penalty and the other which was a deft chip over the Colchester goalkeeper. On 8 August 2017, Roberts left the club by mutual consent, after winning the League Two title on the final day of the season.

=== Wigan Athletic ===
On 29 August 2017, Roberts signed for League One side Wigan Athletic. Wigan entered into contract talks with him at the end of the 2017–18 season. On 9 November 2020 it was announced that Roberts had left Wigan Athletic after three seasons with the club. He blamed the club's financial problems for his exit.

=== Bala Town ===
On 27 November 2020, Roberts joined Cymru Premier side Bala Town.

=== Accrington Stanley and retirement ===
On 4 January 2021, Roberts re-joined EFL League One side Accrington Stanley on a contract until the end of the season, 16 years after signing for them in 2005. Roberts had already played for Wigan and Bala in the 2020–2021 season, usually meaning he wouldn't be able to sign for a third team as players can only play for two teams in one season – however FIFA changed the rules for that season to allow players to play for three teams, to alleviate the effects of the coronavirus pandemic on football. Roberts left the club by mutual consent in March 2021 to join former side Ipswich Town as first team coach, after which he retired from playing.

== Coaching career ==
In March 2021, Roberts returned to Ipswich Town as a first-team coach following the appointment of former manager Paul Cook. Roberts left the role in December 2021 following the sacking of Cook as manager. On 7 April 2022, Roberts joined Chesterfield as first team coach, once again as part of Paul Cook's backroom staff.

== International career ==
Roberts has represented England as he was capped four times by the England C, the team which represents England at semi-professional level during his time at Accrington Stanley between 2005 and 2006. When he moved into the Football League he became ineligible to play for them.

== Career statistics ==
Appearances and goals by club, season and competition
Club	Season	League			National Cup		League Cup		Other		Total	
Club	Season	Division	Apps	Goals	Apps	Goals	Apps	Goals	Apps	Goals	Apps	Goals
Welshpool Town	2003–04	Welsh Premier League	12	0	0	0	0	0	0	0	12	0
Welshpool Town	2004–05	Welsh Premier League	8	9	0	0	0	0	0	0	8	9
Welshpool Town	Total		20	9	0	0	0	0	0	0	20	9
Accrington Stanley	2004–05	Conference National	8	2	0	0	—		0	0	8	2
Accrington Stanley	2005–06	Conference National	42	13	3	3	—		0	0	45	16
Accrington Stanley	2006–07	League Two	14	8	0	0	2	0	0	0	16	8
Accrington Stanley	Total		64	23	3	3	2	0	0	0	69	26
Ipswich Town	2006–07	Championship	33	3	4	0	0	0	—		37	3
Ipswich Town	2007–08	Championship	21	1	0	0	1	0	—		22	1
Ipswich Town	Total		54	4	4	0	1	0	0	0	59	4
Crewe Alexandra (loan)	2007–08	League One	4	0	0	0	0	0	0	0	4	0
Huddersfield Town	2008–09	League One	43	9	1	0	2	2	1 (Note: Appearance(s) in Football League Trophy)	0	47	11
Huddersfield Town	2009–10	League One	43	7	3	2	1	0	3 (Note: One appearance in Football League Trophy, two appearances in League One play-offs)	0	50	9
Huddersfield Town	2010–11	League One	37	9	4	3	2	0	7 (Note: Four appearances in Football League Trophy, three appearances in League One play-offs)	0	50	12
Huddersfield Town	2011–12	League One	39	6	1	0	2	1	3 (Note: Two appearances in Football League Trophy, one appearance in League One play-offs)	0	45	7
Huddersfield Town	Total		162	31	9	5	7	3	14	0	192	39
Swindon Town	2012–13	League One	39	4	1	0	2	0	2 (Note: Appearances in League One play-offs)	0	44	4
Chesterfield	2013–14	League Two	40	11	2	1	1	0	4	0	47	12
Chesterfield	2014–15	League One	34	6	5	2	1	0	2	0	42	8
Chesterfield	Total		74	17	7	3	2	0	6	0	89	20
Portsmouth	2015–16	League Two	33	7	3	2	0	0	2 (Note: Appearances in League Two play-offs)	1	38	10
Portsmouth	2016–17	League Two	41	10	1	0	0	0	0	0	42	10
Portsmouth	Total		74	17	4	2	0	0	2	1	80	20
Wigan Athletic	2017–18	League One	27	1	8	0	0	0	0	0	35	1
Wigan Athletic	2018–19	Championship	16	2	1	0	1	0	—		18	2
Wigan Athletic	2019–20	Championship	9	0	0	0	1	0	—		10	0
Wigan Athletic	2020–21	League One	2	0	0	0	1	0	0	0	3	0
Wigan Athletic	Total		54	3	9	0	3	0	0	0	66	3
Bala Town	2020–21	Cymru Premier	4	1	—		—		—		4	1
Accrington Stanley	2020–21	League One	2	0	—		—		1 (Note: Appearance in EFL Trophy)	0	3	0
Career total			551	109	37	13	17	3	24	1	630	126

== Honours ==
Accrington Stanley

- Conference National: 2005–06

Huddersfield Town

- Football League One play-offs: 2012

Chesterfield

- Football League Two: 2013–14
- Football League Trophy runner-up: 2013–14

Portsmouth

- EFL League Two: 2016–17

Wigan Athletic

- EFL League One: 2017–18

Individual

- Huddersfield Town Player of the Year: 2008–09
- Huddersfield Town Players' Player of the Year: 2008–09
- Football League Two Player of the Month: August 2013
- PFA Team of the Year: 2013–14 League Two
- Football League Two Player of the Year: 2013–14
