= 2012 Football League play-offs =

Football League play-offs
- Season: 2011–12
- Champions: West Ham United (Championship); Huddersfield Town (League One); Crewe Alexandra (League Two)
- Matches: 15
- Goals: 31 (2.07 per match)
- Biggest home win: West Ham 3–0 Cardiff (Championship)
- Biggest away win: Cardiff 0–2 West Ham (Championship); MK Dons 0–2 Huddersfield (League One)
- Highest scoring: Birmingham 2–2 Blackpool; Southend 2–2 Crewe (4 goals)
- Highest attendance: 78,523 – Blackpool v West Ham (Championship final)
- Lowest attendance: 3,606 – Torquay v Cheltenham (League Two semi-final)
- Average attendance: 22,195

The Football League play-offs for the 2011–12 season (referred to as the npower Football League Play-Offs for sponsorship reasons) were held in May 2012. All finals took place at Wembley Stadium in London.

The play-off semi-finals were played over two legs, contested by the teams who finished in 3rd, 4th, 5th and 6th place in the Football League Championship and League One and the 4th, 5th, 6th and 7th-placed teams in the League Two table. The winners of the semi-finals went through to the finals, with the winner of the final gaining promotion for the following season.

The semi-final matches were played from 3 to 17 May 2012. The finals were held between 19 and 27 May 2012.

== Background ==
The Football League play-offs have been held every year since 1987. They take place for each division following the conclusion of the regular season and are contested by the four clubs finishing below the automatic promotion places.

== Championship ==
Pos	Team	Pld	W	D	L	GF	GA	GD	Pts
3	West Ham United	46	24	14	8	81	48	+33	86
4	Birmingham City	46	20	16	10	78	51	+27	76
5	Blackpool	46	20	15	11	79	59	+20	75
6	Cardiff City	46	19	18	9	66	53	+13	75

=== Semi-finals ===
First leg

3 May 2012
19:45

Cardiff City	0–2	West Ham United
	Report	Collison 9', 41'

Cardiff City Stadium, Cardiff
Attendance: 23,029
Referee: Neil Swarbrick

4 May 2012
19:45

Blackpool	1–0	Birmingham City
Davies 45' (o.g.)	Report

Bloomfield Road, Blackpool
Attendance: 13,832
Referee: Mark Halsey

Second leg

7 May 2012
16:30

West Ham United	3–0	Cardiff City
Nolan 15'; Vaz Tê 41'; Maynard 90'	Report

Boleyn Ground, London
Attendance: 34,682
Referee: Mike Dean

West Ham United won 5–0 on aggregate.

9 May 2012
19:45

Birmingham City	2–2	Blackpool
Žigić 64'; Davies 73'	Report	Dobbie 45'; M. Phillips 48'

St Andrew's, Birmingham
Attendance: 28,483
Referee: Chris Foy

Blackpool won 3–2 on aggregate.

=== Final ===
19 May 2012
15:00

Blackpool	1–2	West Ham United
Ince 48'	Report	Cole 35'; Vaz Tê 87'

Wembley Stadium, London
Attendance: 78,523
Referee: Howard Webb

== League One ==
Pos	Team	Pld	W	D	L	GF	GA	GD	Pts
3	Sheffield United	46	27	9	10	92	51	+41	90
4	Huddersfield Town	46	21	18	7	79	47	+32	81
5	Milton Keynes Dons	46	22	14	10	84	47	+37	80
6	Stevenage	46	21	10	15	69	44	+25	73

=== Semi-finals ===
First leg

11 May 2012
19:45

Stevenage	0–0	Sheffield United
	Report

Lamex Stadium, Stevenage
Attendance: 5,802
Referee: Anthony Bates

12 May 2012
12:30

Milton Keynes Dons	0–2	Huddersfield Town
	Report	Rhodes 32'; Hunt 73'

Stadium mk, Milton Keynes
Attendance: 11,893
Referee: Darren Deadman

Second leg

14 May 2012
19:45

Sheffield United	1–0	Stevenage
Porter 85'	Report

Bramall Lane, Sheffield
Attendance: 21,182
Referee: Nigel Miller

Sheffield United won 1–0 on aggregate.

15 May 2012
19:45

Huddersfield Town	1–2	Milton Keynes Dons
Rhodes 18'	Report	Powell 39'; Smith 90+2'

Galpharm Stadium, Huddersfield
Attendance: 15,085
Referee: Scott Mathieson

Huddersfield Town won 3–2 on aggregate.

=== Final ===
26 May 2012
15:00

Huddersfield Town	0–0 (a.e.t.)	Sheffield United
	Report
Penalties
Miller (penalty missed); Johnson (penalty missed); Lee (penalty missed); Clarke (penalty scored); Arfield (penalty scored); Rhodes (penalty scored); Roberts (penalty scored); Woods (penalty scored); Hunt (penalty scored); Morrison (penalty scored); Smithies (penalty scored)	8–7	(penalty missed) Williamson; (penalty scored) Collins; (penalty missed) Lowton; (penalty missed) Taylor; (penalty scored) Porter; (penalty scored) Quinn; (penalty scored) Maguire; (penalty scored) Doyle; (penalty scored) O'Halloran; (penalty scored) Hill; (penalty missed) Simonsen

Wembley Stadium, London
Attendance: 52,100
Referee: Roger East

== League Two ==
Pos	Team	Pld	W	D	L	GF	GA	GD	Pts
4	Southend United	46	25	8	13	77	48	+29	83
5	Torquay United	46	23	12	11	63	50	+13	81
6	Cheltenham Town	46	23	8	15	66	50	+16	77
7	Crewe Alexandra	46	20	12	14	67	59	+8	72

=== Semi-finals ===
First leg

12 May 2012
17:30

Crewe Alexandra	1–0	Southend United
Dugdale 50'	Report

Alexandra Stadium, Crewe
Attendance: 7,221
Referee: Michael Naylor

13 May 2012
12:00

Cheltenham Town	2–0	Torquay United
McGlashan 27'; Burgess 50'	Report

Abbey Business Stadium, Cheltenham
Attendance: 5,273
Referee: James Adcock

Second leg

16 May 2012
19:45

Southend United	2–2	Crewe Alexandra
Harris 64'; Barker 87'	Report	Leitch-Smith 24'; Clayton 86'

Roots Hall, Southend-on-Sea
Attendance: 8,190
Referee: Darren Drysdale

Crewe Alexandra won 3–2 on aggregate.

17 May 2012
19:45

Torquay United	1–2	Cheltenham Town
Atieno 85'	Report	McGlashan 75'; Pack 87'

Plainmoor, Torquay
Attendance: 3,606
Referee: Andy D'Urso

Cheltenham Town won 4–1 on aggregate.

=== Final ===
27 May 2012
15:00

Cheltenham Town	0–2	Crewe Alexandra
	Report	Powell 15'; Moore 82'

Wembley Stadium, London
Attendance: 24,029
Referee: Craig Pawson
