= Papua New Guinea Tamil Sangam =

Tamil Sangam in Port Moresby

- logo of the Tamil Sangam
- Formation: 2018
- Headquarters: Port Moresby, Papua New Guinea
- Members: 300
- Official language: Tamil

The Papua New Guinea Tamil Sangam (PNGTS) is a community organization based in Port Moresby. Each year, the association hosts various events rooted in the Tamil language and culture.This festival of lights—featuring cultural programs and celebrations—has been held annually since 2018.

== History ==
see also: India–Papua New Guinea relations

Such events are considered to help foster a cultural bond between the Tamil community and the society of Papua New Guinea. As one of the most ancient languages of human civilization, Tamil possesses rich cultural roots and traditions. Today, Tamil culture has spread across the globe and is well-regarded for its capacity to coexist harmoniously with other cultures. This organization was registered as an association with the 'Investment Promotion Authority' in 2018. There is no official document specifying the exact date on which this organization was formally established. However, records pertaining to the inaugural ceremony of the Papua New Guinea Tamil Sangam and the ‘Tamil Deepa Vizha’ (Tamil Festival of Lights) held in 2018 serve as the earliest evidence. This indicates that the organization had begun its formal operations in that year.

== Key objectives ==
see also: Tamil diaspora

- To promote the Tamil language and culture among Tamils living in Papua New Guinea.
- To provide opportunities for the next generation of Tamils living in Papua New Guinea to reconnect with their linguistic and cultural roots, engage with and learn from the rich heritage of the Tamil language, and incorporate these elements into their daily lives.
- To provide structured opportunities for the next generation of Tamils to learn the Tamil language (including its unique script and grammar), read and share renowned Tamil prose and poetry, and translate these works (into the Tok Pisin language).
- To organize cultural events that showcase Tamil cuisine, arts, sports, dance, drama, and music.
- To share—wherever possible and appropriate—the pride, excellence, harmony, and friendship inherent in Tamil culture with the people of Papua New Guinea, while demonstrating respect for their own culture and society. Furthermore, to ensure that all such activities remain in full compliance with the laws of the country.
- By promoting initiatives related to art, language, social service, and philanthropy, the Tamil Sangam creates opportunities to engage with local, national, and international communities, facilitating the sharing of knowledge and resources.

== Association committee members ==
The following individuals have served as leaders of PNGTS, from the organization's inception to the present:

- Founding President: Mr. Senthil Kumaran Senthavel
- Second President: Mr. Belavendran Rayappan
- Third President: Dr. Suresh Babu Nagarajan
- Current President: Mrs. Subha Abarna Sasindran wife of West New Britain governor Sasindran muthuvel

other committee members

The founding members who declared their association with the Papua New Guinea Tamil Association in 2018 are as follows:

- Professor C. Lakshmi Narayana Pillai
- Mr. Senthil Kumaran Senthevel
- Mr. Belavendran Rayappan, known as Benny Rayappan
- Dr. Suresh Babu Nagarajan
- Mr. Ganesh Krishnan
- Mrs. Nagarani Ganesh
- Mr. Duraisingam Varnaraj
- Mr. Vijayakumar Sellakkannu
- Mr. Venkatasubramanian Venkateswaran
- Mr. Kalyanaraman Nellicheri Venkataramanan
- Mr. Syed Ibramsha (Musa)
- Mr. Savarimuthu Yagappan
- Mr. Lourdes Anthu Roys
- Professor Ponnusamy Manohar
- Dr. Sivanathan Sivaruban

== Tamil Festival of Lights (Deepa Vizha) ==
In 2023, during the visit of Indian Prime Minister Narendra Modi, a translation of the *Thirukkural* into the Tok Pisin language—prepared by Mrs. Subha Sasindran—was unveiled jointly by Prime Minister Modi and the Prime Minister of Papua New Guinea, James Marape.On October 25, 2026, a 'Tamil Sangam Night'—featuring a diverse range of cultural events—was held at the APEC House in Port Moresby. Local artists have participated and added great value to these events; in particular, the morning performances by emerging artists like Jilla have been very well received. The event was graced by distinguished guests, including West New Britain Governor Sasindran Muthuvel and Indian Ambassador Rajiv Kumar Also, in attendance—having traveled from Tamil Nadu—were motivational speaker Srimathi and film director H. Vinoth, among several others.This festival takes place annually in Port Moresby, with everyone participating to make the occasion a grand success. Through this festival, various events promote the Tamil language, culture, and heritage. This association is also known as the Papua New Guinea Tamil Association. It is an organization established by Tamil people who live or work in the country. Its core mission is to celebrate and preserve the Tamil language, arts, and cultural traditions. It serves as a hub for social gatherings, festivals, and community support. the Tamil Sangam in Papua New Guinea operates as a non-profit organization. During the COVID-19 period, the organization provided ration supplies worth K20,000 to the people.

== Gallery ==
Tamil king Raja raja cholan Albam opening ceremony

Tamil Nites 2026, director H Vinod other Tamil community peoples, Apec house at port Moresby

Welcome banner Tamil Nites 2026

== See also ==
- Tamil sangam
- Papua New Guinea
- Deepavali
