= 2013–14 Huddersfield Town A.F.C. season =

Huddersfield Town
2013–14 season
- Chairman: Dean Hoyle
- Manager: Mark Robins
- Stadium: John Smith's Stadium
- Championship: 17th
- FA Cup: Fourth round (eliminated by Charlton Athletic)
- League Cup: Third round (eliminated by Hull City)
- Top goalscorer: League: James Vaughan; Danny Ward (10 each); All: James Vaughan (12)
- Highest home attendance: 18,309 vs. Leeds United (26 October 2013)
- Lowest home attendance: 6,250 vs. Charlton Athletic (27 August 2013)
- Biggest win: 5–0 vs Barnsley (1 March 2014)
- Biggest defeat: 1–5 vs Leeds United (1 February 2014)
| Home colours | Away colours | Third colours |

The 2013–14 campaign was Huddersfield Town's second consecutive season in the second tier of English football, the Football League Championship.

This was Mark Robins' first full season in charge after being appointed manager on 14 February 2013, during the previous season.

== Squad at the start of the season ==
Note: Flags indicate national team as defined under FIFA eligibility rules; some limited exceptions apply. Players may hold more than one non-FIFA nationality.

| No. | Pos. | Nation | Player |
|---|---|---|---|
| 1 | GK | ENG | Alex Smithies |
| 2 | DF | ENG | Calum Woods |
| 3 | DF | SCO | Paul Dixon |
| 4 | MF | NIR | Oliver Norwood |
| 5 | DF | ENG | Peter Clarke (Captain) |
| 6 | MF | ENG | Jonathan Hogg |
| 7 | MF | IRL | Sean Scannell |
| 8 | MF | ENG | Adam Clayton |
| 9 | FW | ENG | James Vaughan |
| 10 | MF | ENG | Oscar Gobern |
| 11 | MF | ENG | Danny Ward |
| 12 | MF | ENG | Adam Hammill |
| 13 | GK | ENG | Ian Bennett |
| 14 | FW | ENG | Jon Stead |
| 15 | DF | SCO | Murray Wallace |
| 16 | MF | ENG | Keith Southern |
| 17 | FW | NIR | Martin Paterson |
| 19 | FW | ESP | Cristian López |
| 20 | MF | ENG | Chris Atkinson (on loan at Tranmere Rovers) |
| 21 | FW | ENG | Kallum Higginbotham |

| No. | Pos. | Nation | Player |
|---|---|---|---|
| 22 | MF | ENG | Anton Robinson |
| 25 | DF | IRL | Jake Carroll |
| 26 | FW | ENG | Daniel Carr |
| 27 | DF | ENG | Tommy Smith |
| 28 | FW | ENG | Jimmy Spencer |
| 29 | DF | ENG | Liam Ridehalgh |
| 30 | MF | ENG | Jordan Sinnott |
| 31 | MF | ENG | Dale Hopson |
| 32 | DF | ENG | Jack Hunt |
| 33 | DF | WAL | Joel Lynch |
| 34 | MF | ENG | Matt Crooks |
| 35 | GK | ENG | Lloyd Allinson |
| 36 | FW | ENG | Max Leonard |
| 37 | DF | SCO | Robbie McIntyre |
| 38 | MF | USA | Duane Holmes |
| 39 | DF | IRL | Anthony Gerrard |
| 40 | DF | ENG | James Burke |
| 41 | FW | ENG | Paul Mullin |
| 42 | GK | POL | Ed Wilczynski |
| 43 | DF | WAL | Joe Wright |

== Kit ==
The 2013/14 season was the Club's first with technical kit supplier Puma, following the conclusion of the Club's deal with previous supplier Umbro. Rekorderlig Cider and Radian B continued their sponsorship of the home and away shirts, respectively.

The home shirt was a traditional blue and white stripes, complete with white shorts and black socks. The away kit featured a black shirt with red sleeves, and was completed with black shorts and red socks. On 2 August 2013, the Club announced the addition of an all-bright yellow third kit, to be worn the following day at Nottingham Forest. Due to Thornton & Ross's sponsorship of away shirts, Town couldn't wear their Rekorderlig-sponsored home shirt away from home, so this shirt was deemed necessary for away games where black and red could not be worn. These shirts featured the sponsorship of Covonia, one of Thornton & Ross's brands, and 1,000 replicas were produced for sale with profits going to the Huddersfield Town Foundation.

During the course of the season, Alex Smithies wore four different coloured goalkeeper kits, all in the same Puma template.

Supplier: Puma
Sponsor(s): Rekorderlig Cider (home), Radian B (away), Covonia (third)

| Home | Away | Third | GK home | GK away | GK third | GK fourth |

Last updated: 27 September 2013.
Source: The Championship 2013–2014 - Historical Football kits

== Review ==
Following the end of the previous season, Town released Scott Arfield, Alan Lee and Tom Clarke. Lee Novak was offered a new deal, but rejected it and rejoined former manager Lee Clark at Birmingham City instead. Two days later, Clarke reunited with Simon Grayson at Preston North End. On 18 July, young midfielder Chris Atkinson was sent on loan to Tranmere Rovers until 2 January 2014. The following day, Scott Arfield joined Burnley on a free transfer after being released by Town. On 7 August, young midfielder Jordan Sinnott joined Bury on loan until 5 January 2014, but his loan was cancelled on 18 October. The following day, winger Kallum Higginbotham left the club, joining Scottish Premiership side Partick Thistle on a two-year deal. On 22 August, young striker Jimmy Spencer joined Football League Two side Scunthorpe United on loan until January. Following his return from Glanford Park, he was released on 31 January 2014. On 31 August, just as the transfer window was closing, talented right-back Jack Hunt left the Terriers for Premier League side Crystal Palace for a fee believed to be around £2 million. Young goalkeeper Lloyd Allinson was sent out on loan to Ilkeston on 27 September. The following day, left-back Liam Ridehalgh joined Tranmere Rovers on a 3-month loan. He would eventually join the Rovers on a permanent basis on 3 January. On 10 October, Cristian López joined Shrewsbury Town on a month's loan, however, his loan was cancelled on 5 November, due to an injury crisis at the club. On 19 November, striker Daniel Carr joined Fleetwood Town on a month's loan. On 20 December, young goalkeeper Ed Wilczynski joined F.C. United of Manchester on a month's loan. At the end of 2013, four of Town's development squad left for pastures new, Dale Hopson joined Darlington 1883, James Burke and Robbie McIntyre joined Bury and Max Leonard joined Brighouse Town. On 24 January, young striker Paul Mullin joined Conference North side Vauxhall Motors on loan for a month, and Chris Atkinson joined Bradford City on loan for the rest of the season. On 31 January, just as the transfer deadline was shutting up, Jon Stead joined Oldham Athletic on a month's loan. On 19 February, defender Jake Carroll joined Bury on a month's loan. The following day, young midfielder Duane Holmes joined fellow Championship side Yeovil Town on a month's loan, which was curtailed on 17 March. On 14 March, Cristian López joined Northampton Town on loan till the end of the season. The following day, striker Martin Paterson joined Bristol City, also for the remainder of the season. On 24 March, Anton Robinson joined Coventry City on loan for the rest of the season.

On 24 June, after a noticeable lack of activity, Town made their first signing of the summer with Jon Stead returning to the club he left in January 2004 on a free transfer, after leaving Bristol City. Also joining Town on the same day was former loan signing Adam Hammill signed on an undisclosed fee from Wolverhampton Wanderers. The following day, Northern Ireland international Martin Paterson signed on a two-year deal following his release by Burnley. On 3 July, Norwich City striker James Vaughan, who had a successful loan spell the previous season, signed on a 3-year deal for an undisclosed fee. On 29 July, Town signed central midfielder Jonathan Hogg on a three-year deal from fellow Championship side Watford for an undisclosed fee. The following day, Spanish striker Cristian López signed from Atlético Baleares on a free transfer on a one-year deal, following a successful trial period. On 10 September, just as the loan window opened, Town signed Welsh international full-back Jazz Richards on a 93-day emergency loan from Premier League side Swansea City. As the loan window closed on 28 November, Town signed striker Harry Bunn on loan from Manchester City until 5 January 2014, mainly to be put into the team's development squad. He then cancelled his contract with City to sign a permanent deal with the Terriers on 20 January, until the end of the season. On 10 January, Town broke their transfer record in completing the signing of the Bermudan international striker Nahki Wells from Bradford City for a fee believed to be in the region of £1.5 million. On 15 January, Town made their 2nd big signing of the window, by bringing in the winger/striker Joe Lolley from Conference Premier side Kidderminster Harriers for a fee in the region of £250,000. On 21 January, Norwegian youth international midfielder Sondre Tronstad signed on a free transfer from IK Start.

== Squad at the end of the season ==
Note: Flags indicate national team as defined under FIFA eligibility rules; some limited exceptions apply. Players may hold more than one non-FIFA nationality.

| No. | Pos. | Nation | Player |
|---|---|---|---|
| 1 | GK | ENG | Alex Smithies |
| 2 | DF | ENG | Calum Woods |
| 3 | DF | SCO | Paul Dixon |
| 4 | MF | NIR | Oliver Norwood |
| 5 | DF | ENG | Peter Clarke (Captain) |
| 6 | MF | ENG | Jonathan Hogg |
| 7 | MF | IRL | Sean Scannell |
| 8 | MF | ENG | Adam Clayton |
| 9 | FW | ENG | James Vaughan |
| 10 | MF | ENG | Oscar Gobern |
| 11 | MF | ENG | Danny Ward |
| 12 | MF | ENG | Adam Hammill |
| 13 | GK | ENG | Ian Bennett |
| 14 | FW | ENG | Jon Stead (on loan at Bradford City) |
| 15 | DF | SCO | Murray Wallace |
| 16 | MF | ENG | Keith Southern |
| 17 | FW | NIR | Martin Paterson (on loan at Bristol City) |
| 18 | MF | ENG | Joe Lolley |
| 19 | FW | ESP | Cristian López (on loan at Northampton Town) |

| No. | Pos. | Nation | Player |
|---|---|---|---|
| 20 | MF | ENG | Chris Atkinson (on loan at Bradford City) |
| 21 | FW | BER | Nahki Wells |
| 22 | MF | ENG | Anton Robinson (on loan at Coventry City) |
| 25 | DF | IRL | Jake Carroll |
| 26 | FW | ENG | Daniel Carr |
| 27 | DF | ENG | Tommy Smith |
| 29 | MF | DEN | Philip Billing |
| 30 | MF | ENG | Jordan Sinnott |
| 32 | MF | NOR | Sondre Tronstad |
| 33 | DF | WAL | Joel Lynch |
| 34 | MF | ENG | Matt Crooks |
| 35 | GK | ENG | Lloyd Allinson |
| 38 | MF | USA | Duane Holmes |
| 39 | DF | IRL | Anthony Gerrard |
| 41 | FW | ENG | Paul Mullin |
| 42 | GK | POL | Ed Wilczynski |
| 43 | DF | WAL | Joe Wright |
| 44 | FW | ENG | Harry Bunn |

== Transfers ==
=== In ===
| Date | Pos. | Name | From | Fee |
|---|---|---|---|---|
| 20 June | DF | (Republic of Ireland) Jake Carroll | (Republic of Ireland) St Patrick's Athletic | Undisclosed Fee |
| 24 June | MF | (England) Adam Hammill | (England) Wolverhampton Wanderers | Undisclosed Fee |
| 24 June | FW | (England) Jon Stead | (England) Bristol City | Free |
| 25 June | FW | (Northern Ireland) Martin Paterson | (England) Burnley | Free |
| 3 July | FW | (England) James Vaughan | (England) Norwich City | £600,000 |
| 29 July | MF | (England) Jonathan Hogg | (England) Watford | £400,000 |
| 30 July | FW | (Spain) Cristian López | (Spain) Atlético Baleares | Free |
| 10 January | FW | (Bermuda) Nahki Wells | (England) Bradford City | £1,300,000 |
| 15 January | MF | (England) Joe Lolley | (England) Kidderminster Harriers | £250,000 |
| 20 January | FW | (England) Harry Bunn | (England) Manchester City | Free |
| 21 January | MF | (Norway) Sondre Tronstad | (Norway) IK Start | Free |

=== Loans in ===
| Date | Pos. | Name | From | Expiry |
|---|---|---|---|---|
| 10 September | DF | (Wales) Jazz Richards | (Wales) Swansea City | December 2013 |
| 18 October | MF | (England) Jordan Sinnott | (England) Bury | Loan Cancelled |
| 5 November | FW | (Spain) Cristian López | (England) Shrewsbury Town | Loan Cancelled |
| 27 November | GK | (England) Lloyd Allinson | (England) Ilkeston | Loan Ended |
| 28 November | FW | (England) Harry Bunn | (England) Manchester City | January 2014 |
| 30 December | DF | (England) Liam Ridehalgh | (England) Tranmere Rovers | Loan Ended |
| 30 December | FW | (England) Jimmy Spencer | (England) Scunthorpe United | Loan Cancelled |
| 21 January | FW | (England) Daniel Carr | (England) Fleetwood Town | Loan Ended |
| 20 February | GK | (Poland) Ed Wilczynski | (England) F.C. United of Manchester | Loan Ended |
| 24 February | FW | (England) Paul Mullin | (England) Vauxhall Motors | Loan Ended |
| 3 March | FW | (England) Jon Stead | (England) Oldham Athletic | Loan Ended |
| 17 March | MF | (United States) Duane Holmes | (England) Yeovil Town | Loan Cancelled |
| 19 March | DF | (Republic of Ireland) Jake Carroll | (England) Bury | Loan Ended |

=== Out ===
| Date | Pos. | Name | To | Fee |
|---|---|---|---|---|
| 22 May | FW | (England) Lee Novak | (England) Birmingham City | Free |
| 24 May | DF | (England) Tom Clarke | (England) Preston North End | Free |
| 16 July | FW | (Republic of Ireland) Alan Lee | (England) Ipswich Town | Free |
| 19 July | MF | (Scotland) Scott Arfield | (England) Burnley | Free |
| 8 August | MF | (England) Kallum Higginbotham | (Scotland) Partick Thistle | Free |
| 31 August | DF | (England) Jack Hunt | (England) Crystal Palace | £2,000,000 |
| 31 December | DF | (England) James Burke | (England) Bury | Free |
| 31 December | MF | (England) Dale Hopson | (England) Darlington 1883 | Free |
| 31 December | FW | (England) Max Leonard | (England) Brighouse Town | Free |
| 31 December | DF | (Scotland) Robbie McIntyre | (England) Bury | Free |
| 3 January | DF | (England) Liam Ridehalgh | (England) Tranmere Rovers | Undisclosed Fee |
| 31 January | FW | (England) Jimmy Spencer | (England) Notts County | Free |

=== Loans out ===
| Date | Pos. | Name | To | Expiry |
|---|---|---|---|---|
| 18 July | MF | (England) Chris Atkinson | (England) Tranmere Rovers | January 2014 |
| 7 August | MF | (England) Jordan Sinnott | (England) Bury | January 2014 |
| 22 August | FW | (England) Jimmy Spencer | (England) Scunthorpe United | January 2014 |
| 27 September | GK | (England) Lloyd Allinson | (England) Ilkeston | October 2013 |
| 28 September | DF | (England) Liam Ridehalgh | (England) Tranmere Rovers | December 2013 |
| 10 October | FW | (Spain) Cristian López | (England) Shrewsbury Town | November 2013 |
| 19 November | FW | (England) Daniel Carr | (England) Fleetwood Town | December 2013 |
| 17 December | DF | (Wales) Jazz Richards | (Wales) Swansea City | Loan Ended |
| 20 December | GK | (Poland) Ed Wilczynski | (England) F.C. United of Manchester | January 2014 |
| 24 January | MF | (England) Chris Atkinson | (England) Bradford City | End Of Season |
| 24 January | FW | (England) Paul Mullin | (England) Vauxhall Motors | February 2014 |
| 31 January | FW | (England) Jon Stead | (England) Oldham Athletic | March 2014 |
| 19 February | DF | (Republic of Ireland) Jake Carroll | (England) Bury | March 2014 |
| 20 February | MF | (United States) Duane Holmes | (England) Yeovil Town | March 2014 |
| 14 March | FW | (Spain) Cristian López | (England) Northampton Town | End Of Season |
| 15 March | FW | (Northern Ireland) Martin Paterson | (England) Bristol City | End Of Season |
| 24 March | MF | (England) Anton Robinson | (England) Coventry City | End Of Season |

== Statistics ==
=== Overview ===
| Competition | First match | Last match | Starting round | Final position | Record | | | | | | | |
| Competition | First match | Last match | Starting round | Final position | Pld | W | D | L | GF | GA | GD | Win % |
|---|---|---|---|---|---|---|---|---|---|---|---|---|
| Championship | 3 August 2013 | 3 May 2014 | Matchday 1 | 17th | 46 | 14 | 11 | 21 | 58 | 65 | −7 | 30.43 |
| FA Cup | 4 January 2014 | 25 January 2014 | Third round | Fourth round | 2 | 1 | 0 | 1 | 3 | 3 | +0 | 50.00 |
| League Cup | 6 August 2013 | 24 September 2013 | First round | Third round | 3 | 2 | 0 | 1 | 5 | 4 | +1 | 66.67 |
| Total | | | | | 51 | 17 | 11 | 23 | 66 | 72 | −6 | 33.33 |

Last updated: 3 May 2014
Source: Competitions

=== League table ===
| Pos | Team | Pld | W | D | L | GF | GA | GD | Pts |
|---|---|---|---|---|---|---|---|---|---|
| 15 | Leeds United | 46 | 16 | 9 | 21 | 59 | 67 | −8 | 57 |
| 16 | Sheffield Wednesday | 46 | 13 | 14 | 19 | 63 | 65 | −2 | 53 |
| 17 | Huddersfield Town | 46 | 14 | 11 | 21 | 58 | 65 | −7 | 53 |
| 18 | Charlton Athletic | 46 | 13 | 12 | 21 | 41 | 61 | −20 | 51 |
| 19 | Millwall | 46 | 11 | 15 | 20 | 46 | 74 | −28 | 48 |

Source: BBC Sport
Rules for classification: 1) points; 2) goal difference; 3) number of goals scored

=== Results summary ===
| Overall | | | | | | | | Home | | | | | | Away | | | | | |
| Pld | W | D | L | GF | GA | GD | Pts | W | D | L | GF | GA | GD | W | D | L | GF | GA | GD |
|---|---|---|---|---|---|---|---|---|---|---|---|---|---|---|---|---|---|---|---|
| 46 | 14 | 11 | 21 | 58 | 65 | −7 | 53 | 8 | 6 | 9 | 34 | 32 | +2 | 6 | 5 | 12 | 24 | 33 | −9 |

Last updated: 3 May 2014.

=== Results by round ===
| Round | 1 | 2 | 3 | 4 | 5 | 6 | 7 | 8 | 9 | 10 | 11 | 12 | 13 | 14 | 15 | 16 | 17 | 18 | 19 | 20 | 21 | 22 | 23 | 24 | 25 | 26 | 27 | 28 | 29 | 30 | 31 | 32 | 33 | 34 | 35 | 36 | 37 | 38 | 39 | 40 | 41 | 42 | 43 | 44 | 45 | 46 |
|---|---|---|---|---|---|---|---|---|---|---|---|---|---|---|---|---|---|---|---|---|---|---|---|---|---|---|---|---|---|---|---|---|---|---|---|---|---|---|---|---|---|---|---|---|---|---|
| Ground | A | H | A | H | A | H | H | A | H | A | H | A | H | A | H | A | H | A | A | H | A | H | H | A | H | A | A | A | H | H | A | H | H | A | A | H | A | H | A | H | H | A | H | A | H | A |
| Result | L | D | W | W | L | D | W | D | D | D | L | L | W | L | L | W | W | W | L | L | D | D | W | L | W | L | L | L | W | L | W | L | W | L | D | L | L | D | D | L | L | L | D | W | L | W |
| Position | 21 | 18 | 12 | 7 | 12 | 11 | 9 | 9 | 8 | 9 | 12 | 13 | 9 | 14 | 15 | 13 | 12 | 10 | 11 | 12 | 13 | 14 | 11 | 13 | 12 | 13 | 13 | 13 | 13 | 14 | 13 | 14 | 13 | 14 | 14 | 15 | 16 | 16 | 16 | 17 | 17 | 17 | 17 | 17 | 17 | 17 |

Updated to match(es) played on 3 May 2014. Source:
A = Away; H = Home; W = Win; D = Draw; L = Loss

== Squad statistics ==
=== Appearances and goals ===
As of 3 May 2014

| No. | Pos | Nat | Player | Total | | Championship | | FA Cup | | League Cup | |
| No. | Pos | Nat | Player | Apps | Goals | Apps | Goals | Apps | Goals | Apps | Goals |
|---|---|---|---|---|---|---|---|---|---|---|---|
| 1 | GK | (England) ENG | Alex Smithies | 51 | 0 | 46 | 0 | 2 | 0 | 3 | 0 |
| 2 | DF | (England) ENG | Calum Woods | 20 | 1 | 11+8 | 1 | 0 | 0 | 1 | 0 |
| 3 | DF | (Scotland) SCO | Paul Dixon | 39 | 0 | 37 | 0 | 2 | 0 | 0 | 0 |
| 4 | MF | (Northern Ireland) NIR | Oliver Norwood | 45 | 6 | 37+3 | 5 | 2 | 1 | 3 | 0 |
| 5 | DF | (England) ENG | Peter Clarke | 28 | 0 | 24+2 | 0 | 0 | 0 | 2 | 0 |
| 6 | MF | (England) ENG | Jonathan Hogg | 37 | 1 | 34 | 0 | 1 | 0 | 2 | 1 |
| 7 | MF | (Republic of Ireland) IRL | Sean Scannell | 42 | 1 | 8+30 | 1 | 0+2 | 0 | 1+1 | 0 |
| 8 | MF | (England) ENG | Adam Clayton | 46 | 7 | 41+1 | 7 | 2 | 0 | 2 | 0 |
| 9 | FW | (England) ENG | James Vaughan | 26 | 12 | 20+3 | 10 | 1 | 0 | 2 | 2 |
| 10 | MF | (England) ENG | Oscar Gobern | 25 | 0 | 12+11 | 0 | 1 | 0 | 1 | 0 |
| 11 | MF | (England) ENG | Danny Ward | 40 | 10 | 27+11 | 10 | 2 | 0 | 0 | 0 |
| 12 | MF | (England) ENG | Adam Hammill | 49 | 5 | 42+2 | 4 | 2 | 0 | 1+2 | 1 |
| 14 | FW | (England) ENG | Jon Stead | 14 | 1 | 6+6 | 1 | 0 | 0 | 0+2 | 0 |
| 15 | DF | (Scotland) SCO | Murray Wallace | 21 | 0 | 15+2 | 0 | 2 | 0 | 1+1 | 0 |
| 16 | MF | (England) ENG | Keith Southern | 11 | 1 | 8+2 | 1 | 0 | 0 | 1 | 0 |
| 17 | FW | (Northern Ireland) NIR | Martin Paterson | 26 | 6 | 13+9 | 5 | 1 | 1 | 3 | 0 |
| 18 | MF | (England) ENG | Joe Lolley | 6 | 1 | 1+5 | 1 | 0 | 0 | 0 | 0 |
| 19 | FW | (Spain) ESP | Cristian López | 4 | 0 | 0+2 | 0 | 0+1 | 0 | 0+1 | 0 |
| 21 | DF | (Wales) WAL | Jazz Richards | 9 | 0 | 7+2 | 0 | 0 | 0 | 0 | 0 |
| 21 | FW | (Bermuda) BER | Nahki Wells | 22 | 7 | 21+1 | 7 | 0 | 0 | 0 | 0 |
| 25 | DF | (Republic of Ireland) IRL | Jake Carroll | 7 | 0 | 4 | 0 | 0 | 0 | 3 | 0 |
| 26 | FW | (England) ENG | Daniel Carr | 3 | 0 | 0+2 | 0 | 0 | 0 | 1 | 0 |
| 27 | DF | (England) ENG | Tommy Smith | 27 | 0 | 23+1 | 0 | 2 | 0 | 1 | 0 |
| 29 | MF | (Denmark) DEN | Philip Billing | 1 | 0 | 0+1 | 0 | 0 | 0 | 0 | 0 |
| 30 | MF | (England) ENG | Jordan Sinnott | 1 | 0 | 0 | 0 | 0+1 | 0 | 0 | 0 |
| 32 | DF | (England) ENG | Jack Hunt | 4 | 0 | 1+1 | 0 | 0 | 0 | 1+1 | 0 |
| 33 | DF | (Wales) WAL | Joel Lynch | 31 | 3 | 27+2 | 2 | 0 | 0 | 2 | 1 |
| 38 | MF | (United States) USA | Duane Holmes | 19 | 0 | 2+14 | 0 | 0+2 | 0 | 0+1 | 0 |
| 39 | DF | (Republic of Ireland) IRL | Anthony Gerrard | 44 | 1 | 39+1 | 1 | 2 | 0 | 2 | 0 |
| 44 | FW | (England) ENG | Harry Bunn | 3 | 0 | 0+3 | 0 | 0 | 0 | 0 | 0 |

=== Top scorers ===
| Place | Position | Nation | Number | Name | Championship | FA Cup | League Cup | Total |
|---|---|---|---|---|---|---|---|---|
| 1 | FW | (England) | 9 | James Vaughan | 10 | 0 | 2 | 12 |
| 2 | MF | (England) | 11 | Danny Ward | 10 | 0 | 0 | 10 |
| 3= | MF | (England) | 8 | Adam Clayton | 7 | 0 | 0 | 7 |
| 3= | FW | (Bermuda) | 21 | Nahki Wells | 7 | 0 | 0 | 7 |
| 5= | MF | (Northern Ireland) | 4 | Oliver Norwood | 5 | 1 | 0 | 6 |
| 5= | FW | (Northern Ireland) | 17 | Martin Paterson | 5 | 1 | 0 | 6 |
| 7 | MF | (England) | 12 | Adam Hammill | 4 | 0 | 1 | 5 |
| 8= | DF | (Wales) | 33 | Joel Lynch | 2 | 0 | 1 | 3 |
| 8= | | | | Own goals | 2 | 1 | 0 | 3 |
| 10= | DF | (England) | 2 | Calum Woods | 1 | 0 | 0 | 1 |
| 10= | MF | (England) | 6 | Jonathan Hogg | 0 | 0 | 1 | 1 |
| 10= | MF | (Republic of Ireland) | 7 | Sean Scannell | 1 | 0 | 0 | 1 |
| 10= | FW | (England) | 14 | Jon Stead | 1 | 0 | 0 | 1 |
| 10= | MF | (England) | 16 | Keith Southern | 1 | 0 | 0 | 1 |
| 10= | MF | (England) | 18 | Joe Lolley | 1 | 0 | 0 | 1 |
| 10= | DF | (Republic of Ireland) | 39 | Anthony Gerrard | 1 | 0 | 0 | 1 |
| | | | | TOTALS | 58 | 3 | 5 | 66 |

=== Disciplinary record ===
| Number | Nation | Position | Name | Championship | | FA Cup | | League Cup | | Total | |
| Number | Nation | Position | Name | Booked | Sent off (straight red) | Booked | Sent off (straight red) | Booked | Sent off (straight red) | Booked | Sent off (straight red) |
| 8 | (England) | MF | Adam Clayton | 8 | 0 | 0 | 0 | 1 | 0 | 9 | 0 |
| 4 | (Northern Ireland) | MF | Oliver Norwood | 7 | 0 | 1 | 0 | 0 | 0 | 8 | 0 |
| 39 | (Republic of Ireland) | DF | Anthony Gerrard | 7 | 0 | 1 | 0 | 0 | 0 | 8 | 0 |
| 33 | (Wales) | DF | Joel Lynch | 6 | 2 | 0 | 0 | 1 | 0 | 7 | 2 |
| 3 | (Scotland) | DF | Paul Dixon | 5 | 0 | 1 | 0 | 0 | 0 | 6 | 0 |
| 27 | (England) | DF | Tommy Smith | 6 | 0 | 0 | 0 | 0 | 0 | 6 | 0 |
| 10 | (England) | MF | Oscar Gobern | 5 | 0 | 0 | 0 | 0 | 0 | 5 | 0 |
| 12 | (England) | MF | Adam Hammill | 3 | 0 | 1 | 0 | 1 | 0 | 5 | 0 |
| 2 | (England) | DF | Calum Woods | 3 | 0 | 0 | 0 | 1 | 0 | 4 | 0 |
| 6 | (England) | MF | Jonathan Hogg | 4 | 0 | 0 | 0 | 0 | 0 | 4 | 0 |
| 15 | (Scotland) | DF | Murray Wallace | 4 | 0 | 0 | 0 | 0 | 0 | 4 | 0 |
| 5 | (England) | DF | Peter Clarke | 3 | 1 | 0 | 0 | 0 | 0 | 3 | 1 |
| 9 | (England) | FW | James Vaughan | 3 | 1 | 0 | 0 | 0 | 0 | 3 | 1 |
| 1 | (England) | GK | Alex Smithies | 3 | 0 | 0 | 0 | 0 | 0 | 3 | 0 |
| 17 | (Northern Ireland) | FW | Martin Paterson | 2 | 0 | 1 | 0 | 0 | 0 | 3 | 0 |
| 11 | (England) | MF | Danny Ward | 1 | 0 | 0 | 0 | 0 | 0 | 1 | 0 |
| 16 | (England) | MF | Keith Southern | 1 | 0 | 0 | 0 | 0 | 0 | 1 | 0 |
| 21 | (Wales) | DF | Jazz Richards | 1 | 0 | 0 | 0 | 0 | 0 | 1 | 0 |
| 21 | (Bermuda) | FW | Nahki Wells | 1 | 0 | 0 | 0 | 0 | 0 | 1 | 0 |
| | | | Totals | 72 | 4 | 5 | 0 | 4 | 0 | 81 | 4 |

== Results ==
=== Pre–season ===
| 12 July 2013 | Brighouse Town | 2–2 | Huddersfield Town XI | Brighouse |
| 19:00 | Lamb 52'; Matthews 90+2' | | Holmes 80'; Chapel 88' | Stadium: Dual Seal Stadium; Attendance: ? |

| 13 July 2013 | Chesterfield | 2–1 | Huddersfield Town | Chesterfield |
| 15:00 | Roberts 8'; Devitt 61' | Report | Ward 11' | Stadium: Proact Stadium; Attendance: 2,148 |

| 16 July 2013 | York City | 1–1 | Huddersfield Town | York |
| 19:45 | Fletcher 4' | Report | Carr 83' | Stadium: Bootham Crescent; Attendance: 1,839 |

| 17 July 2013 | Guiseley | 2–2 | Huddersfield Town | Guiseley |
| 19:45 | Marsh 35', 80' (pen.) | | Crooks 43'; Sinnott 81' | Stadium: Nethermoor Park; Attendance: ? |

| 19 July 2013 | Radcliffe Borough | 0–4 | Huddersfield Town XI | Radcliffe |
| 19:15 | | | Carr 7'; Crooks 25', 83'; Leonard 45' | Stadium: Stainton Park; Attendance: ? |

| 20 July 2013 | Rotherham United | 0–1 | Huddersfield Town | Rotherham |
| 15:00 | | | Paterson 86' | Stadium: New York Stadium; Attendance: 2,445; Referee: Craig Pawson |

| 23 July 2013 | Dulwich Hamlet | 2–1 | Huddersfield Town XI | East Dulwich |
| 19:00 | Otzumer 57'; Boyer 88' | | Crooks 90' | Stadium: Champion Hill; Attendance: 421 |

| 24 July 2013 | Huddersfield Town | 2–4 | Real Betis | Huddersfield |
| 19:45 | Vaughan 11'; Paterson 52' | | Verdú 32'; Chuli 35', 49', 50' | Stadium: John Smith's Stadium; Attendance: 4,706; Referee: Graham Salisbury |

| 27 July 2013 | Oldham Athletic | 3–2 | Huddersfield Town | Oldham |
| 15:00 | Baxter 25' (pen.); Montaño 70', 75' | | López 63'; Paterson 66' | Stadium: Boundary Park; Attendance: 1,661 |

| 1 August 2013 | A.F.C. Emley | 0–4 | Huddersfield Town XI | Emley |
| 19:15 | | | Carr 29', 83' (pen.); Higginbotham 72'; Hopson 86' | Stadium: Welfare Ground; Attendance: ? |

| 7 August 2013 | Bradford Park Avenue | 2–0 | Huddersfield Town XI | Bradford |
| 19:00 | Corner 22'; Ellam 37' | | | Stadium: Horsfall Stadium |

=== Championship ===
| 3 August 2013 1 | Nottingham Forest | 1–0 | Huddersfield Town | Nottingham |
| 15:00 | Lansbury 53' | | Lynch (yellow card) 64'; Hammill (yellow card) 90+4' | Stadium: City Ground; Attendance: 25,535; Referee: Graham Salisbury |

| 10 August 2013 2 | Huddersfield Town | 1–1 | Queens Park Rangers | Huddersfield |
| 15:00 | Vaughan 35'; Lynch (yellow card) 74' | | Granero (yellow card) 16'; Hoilett 38' | Stadium: John Smith's Stadium; Attendance: 13,896; Referee: Andy Haines |

| 17 August 2013 3 | Millwall | 0–1 | Huddersfield Town | South Bermondsey |
| 15:00 | Shittu (yellow card) 90' | | Vaughan 57'; Smithies (yellow card) 82' | Stadium: The Den; Attendance: 9,503; Referee: Oliver Langford |

| 24 August 2013 4 | Huddersfield Town | 5–1 | AFC Bournemouth | Huddersfield |
| 15:00 | Hammill 14'; Paterson (yellow card) 20'; Vaughan 37', 42', 58' (pen.); Norwood (yellow card) 66'; Clayton 78' | | Pitman (yellow card) 8'; Pugh 68'; Hughes (yellow card) 70' | Stadium: John Smith's Stadium; Attendance: 12,025; Referee: Darren Bond |

| 31 August 2013 5 | Barnsley | 2–1 | Huddersfield Town | Barnsley |
| 15:00 | O'Grady 8'; Dawson (yellow card) 14'; Pedersen 32' | | Vaughan 61'; Norwood (yellow card) 62' | Stadium: Oakwell; Attendance: 13,593; Referee: Lee Mason |

| 14 September 2013 6 | Huddersfield Town | 0–0 | Doncaster Rovers | Huddersfield |
| 15:00 | Hammill (yellow card) 22'; Vaughan (yellow card) 43' | | Wellens (yellow card) 45' | Stadium: John Smith's Stadium; Attendance: 13,102; Referee: Paul Tierney |

| 17 September 2013 7 | Huddersfield Town | 2–1 | Charlton Athletic | Huddersfield |
| 19:45 | Vaughan 45+2'; Lynch 65'; Clayton (yellow card) 90+4' | | Dervite (yellow card) 32'; Church (yellow card) 57'; Stewart 79'; Stephens (yellow card) 90+1' | Stadium: John Smith's Stadium; Attendance: 12,248; Referee: Stuart Attwell |

| 21 September 2013 8 | Blackburn Rovers | 0–0 | Huddersfield Town | Blackburn |
| 15:00 | Williamson (yellow card) 82' | | Gobern (yellow card) 67' | Stadium: Ewood Park; Attendance: 14,582; Referee: Stephen Martin |

| 27 September 2013 9 | Huddersfield Town | 1–1 | Blackpool | Huddersfield |
| 19:45 | Vaughan 62' | | Fuller 27' (yellow card) 88'; Bishop (yellow card) 48'; Ángel (yellow card) 54' (yellow-red card) 83'; Robinson (yellow card) 67'; MacKenzie (yellow card) 83' | Stadium: John Smith's Stadium; Attendance: 12,337; Referee: Scott Mathieson |

| 1 October 2013 10 | Middlesbrough | 1–1 | Huddersfield Town | Middlesbrough |
| 19:45 | Gibson 79' | | Vaughan 59'; Clarke (yellow card) 75'; Hogg (yellow card) 82' | Stadium: Riverside Stadium; Attendance: 12,793; Referee: Jeremy Simpson |

| 5 October 2013 11 | Huddersfield Town | 1–2 | Watford | Huddersfield |
| 15:00 | Ward 17' (yellow card) 38' | | Forestieri 18'; Faraoni (yellow card) 36'; Pudil 43'; McGugan (yellow card) 85' | Stadium: John Smith's Stadium; Attendance: 14,311; Referee: David Webb |

| 19 October 2013 12 | Leicester City | 2–1 | Huddersfield Town | Leicester |
| 15:00 | Vardy 11' (yellow card) 90+1'; Gerrard 38' (o.g.) | | Konchesky 67' (o.g.); Clayton (yellow card) 73'; Vaughan (red card) 83' | Stadium: King Power Stadium; Attendance: 22,297; Referee: James Adcock |

| 26 October 2013 13 | Huddersfield Town | 3–2 | Leeds United | Huddersfield |
| 12:30 | Ward 10'; Lees 63' (o.g.); Stead 77'; Clarke (yellow card) 90+2' | | Smith 2'; Murphy (yellow card) 23'; Warnock (yellow card) 45+1'; Blackstock 73' | Stadium: John Smith's Stadium; Attendance: 18,309; Referee: Neil Swarbrick |

| 2 November 2013 14 | Wigan Athletic | 2–1 | Huddersfield Town | Wigan |
| 15:00 | Barnett 20'; Powell 50'; Shotton (yellow card) 81' | | Norwood 45+2'; Gobern (yellow card) 69' | Stadium: DW Stadium; Attendance: 16,112; Referee: Tony Harrington |

| 9 November 2013 15 | Huddersfield Town | 1–3 | Birmingham City | Huddersfield |
| 15:00 | Gerrard 31'; Richards (yellow card) 35'; Lynch (yellow card) 90' | | Žigić 11'; Bartley 66', 81' (yellow card) 22' (yellow-red card) 82'; Hancox (yellow card) 71' | Stadium: John Smith's Stadium; Attendance: 14,161; Referee: Gavin Ward |

| 23 November 2013 16 | Sheffield Wednesday | 1–2 | Huddersfield Town | Sheffield |
| 12:15 | McPhail (yellow card) 33'; Llera (yellow card) 44'; Wickham 90+3' | | Paterson 11'; Clayton (yellow card) 15' (goal) 68'; Vaughan (yellow card) 31'; Smith (yellow card) 84'; Smithies (yellow card) 90+4' | Stadium: Hillsborough Stadium; Attendance: 19,338; Referee: Roger East |

| 30 November 2013 17 | Huddersfield Town | 2–1 | Burnley | Huddersfield |
| 15:00 | Norwood 50'; Vaughan 55' (pen.); Clayton (yellow card) 90+6' | | Duff (yellow card) 55' (yellow-red card) 90+4'; Vokes (yellow card) 77'; Ings 84' | Stadium: John Smith's Stadium; Attendance: 17,390; Referee: Eddie Ilderton |

| 3 December 2013 18 | Bolton Wanderers | 0–1 | Huddersfield Town | Bolton |
| 20:00 | Mills (yellow card) 90+1' | | Smith (yellow card) 66'; Norwood 71' (yellow card) 88' | Stadium: Reebok Stadium; Attendance: 15,452; Referee: Geoff Eltringham |

| 7 December 2013 19 | Ipswich Town | 2–1 | Huddersfield Town | Ipswich |
| 15:00 | McGoldrick 50'; Murphy 89' | | Ward 35'; Gerrard (yellow card) 90+6' | Stadium: Portman Road; Attendance: 15,386; Referee: Gary Sutton |

| 14 December 2013 20 | Huddersfield Town | 0–1 | Reading | Huddersfield |
| 15:00 | Norwood (yellow card) 38'; Lynch (yellow card) 87' (yellow-red card) 90+5' | | Sharp 32'; Williams (yellow card) 42' | Stadium: John Smith's Stadium; Attendance: 13,572; Referee: Oliver Langford |

| 21 December 2013 21 | Brighton & Hove Albion | 0–0 | Huddersfield Town | Brighton |
| 15:00 | LuaLua (yellow card) 86'; Bridcutt (yellow card) 90+1' | | Dixon (yellow card) 31'; Woods (yellow card) 88'; Smith (yellow card) 90+2' | Stadium: Falmer Stadium; Attendance: 27,155; Referee: James Adcock |

| 26 December 2013 22 | Huddersfield Town | 1–1 | Derby County | Huddersfield |
| 15:00 | Wallace (yellow card) 7'; Hogg (yellow card) 53'; Dixon (yellow card) 65'; Hammill (yellow card) 77'; Paterson 86' | | Bryson 30' | Stadium: John Smith's Stadium; Attendance: 18,159; Referee: Carl Boyeson |

| 29 December 2013 23 | Huddersfield Town | 5–1 | Yeovil Town | Huddersfield |
| 15:00 | Clayton 23'; Paterson 40'; Lynch 43'; Ward 65', 68' | | Miller 14'; Fontaine (yellow card) 56' | Stadium: John Smith's Stadium; Attendance: 12,946; Referee: Keith Hill |

| 1 January 2014 24 | Burnley | 3–2 | Huddersfield Town | Burnley |
| 15:00 | Ings 6', 41'; Marney (yellow card) 71'; Trippier 79' | | Paterson 20', 89' (yellow card) 58'; Wallace (yellow card) 39' | Stadium: Turf Moor; Attendance: 14,047; Referee: David Coote |

| 11 January 2014 25 | Huddersfield Town | 1–0 | Millwall | Huddersfield |
| 15:00 | Wells 90' | | Lowry (yellow card) 13'; Bailey (yellow card) 30'; Smith (yellow card) 53' | Stadium: John Smith's Stadium; Attendance: 12,651; Referee: Paul Tierney |

| 18 January 2014 26 | Queens Park Rangers | 2–1 | Huddersfield Town | Shepherd's Bush |
| 15:00 | Johnson (yellow card) 44'; Hill (yellow card) 45+3'; Austin 55', 79'; Carroll (yellow card) 87' | | Wells 68' | Stadium: Loftus Road; Attendance: 17,185; Referee: Simon Hooper |

| 28 January 2014 27 | AFC Bournemouth | 2–1 | Huddersfield Town | Bournemouth |
| 19:45 | Grabban 55' (pen.); Rantie 72' (yellow card) 73' | | Smith (yellow card) 54'; Woods 59'; Southern (yellow card) 63'; Norwood (yellow card) 75' | Stadium: Goldsands Stadium; Attendance: 7,258; Referee: Graham Horwood |

| 1 February 2014 28 | Leeds United | 5–1 | Huddersfield Town | Leeds |
| 15:00 | Byram (yellow card) 44'; McCormack 45+3', 62', 73'; Kébé 50'; Austin (yellow card) 79'; Mowatt 82' | | Ward 25'; Wallace (yellow card) 89' | Stadium: Elland Road; Attendance: 31,103; Referee: Graham Salisbury |

| 8 February 2014 29 | Huddersfield Town | 1–0 | Wigan Athletic | Huddersfield |
| 15:00 | Lynch (yellow card) 67'; Clayton 85' | | | Stadium: John Smith's Stadium; Attendance: 15,576; Referee: Mark Brown |

| 11 February 2014 30 | Huddersfield Town | 0–3 | Nottingham Forest | Huddersfield |
| 19:45 | Vaughan (yellow card) 20'; Clayton (yellow card) 59' | | Paterson 63', 82'; Halford (yellow card) 72'; Henderson 89' | Stadium: John Smith's Stadium; Attendance: 13,249; Referee: Nigel Miller |

| 15 February 2014 31 | Birmingham City | 1–2 | Huddersfield Town | Birmingham |
| 15:00 | Macheda (yellow card) 90+5'; Lee 90+5' | | Norwood 10' (yellow card) 63'; Clayton (yellow card) 14' (goal) 60'; Smithies (yellow card) 43'; Dixon (yellow card) 75' | Stadium: St Andrew's; Attendance: 14,112; Referee: Darren Deadman |

| 22 February 2014 32 | Huddersfield Town | 0–2 | Sheffield Wednesday | Huddersfield |
| 15:00 | Smith (yellow card) 54'; Gerrard (yellow card) 78' | | Palmer (yellow card) 28'; Hélan 40'; Hutchinson (yellow card) 50'; Gardner (yellow card) 65'; Maghoma 72' | Stadium: John Smith's Stadium; Attendance: 16,499; Referee: Neil Swarbrick |

| 1 March 2014 33 | Huddersfield Town | 5–0 | Barnsley | Huddersfield |
| 15:00 | Southern 29'; Ward 32'; Hammill 48'; Clayton 58' (pen.); Scannell 86' | | Hunt (yellow card) 29'; Proschwitz (yellow card) 34'; Steele (yellow card) 57'; Frimpong (yellow card) 62' | Stadium: John Smith's Stadium; Attendance: 14,236; Referee: David Coote |

| 8 March 2014 34 | Doncaster Rovers | 2–0 | Huddersfield Town | Doncaster |
| 15:00 | Sharp 28'; Cotterill 55' | | | Stadium: Keepmoat Stadium; Attendance: 9,305; Referee: Mark Haywood |

| 12 March 2014 35 | Charlton Athletic | 0–0 | Huddersfield Town | Charlton |
| 19:45 | Poyet (yellow card) 57' | | Dixon (yellow card) 90+1' | Stadium: The Valley; Attendance: 12,974; Referee: Keith Hill |

| 15 March 2014 36 | Huddersfield Town | 2–4 | Blackburn Rovers | Huddersfield |
| 15:00 | Hammill 25'; Wells 71' | | Rhodes 4', 55', 81'; Conway 65'; Kilgallon (yellow card) 76' | Stadium: John Smith's Stadium; Attendance: 13,311; Referee: Mick Russell |

| 22 March 2014 37 | Blackpool | 1–0 | Huddersfield Town | Blackpool |
| 15:00 | Fuller 4' | | Wells (yellow card) 45+1'; Clayton (yellow card) 61'; Gerrard (yellow card) 69'; Woods (yellow card) 82' | Stadium: Bloomfield Road; Attendance: 14,624; Referee: Rob Lewis |

| 25 March 2014 38 | Huddersfield Town | 2–2 | Middlesbrough | Huddersfield |
| 19:45 | Hammill 3'; Wells 34'; Dixon (yellow card) 42' | | Adomah 10', 47'; Ledesma (yellow card) 62'; Varga (yellow card) 64'; Friend (yellow card) 84' | Stadium: John Smith's Stadium; Attendance: 11,999; Referee: James Linington |

| 29 March 2014 39 | Reading | 1–1 | Huddersfield Town | Reading |
| 15:00 | Pogrebnyak 7' (pen.); McCleary (yellow card) 18' | | Smith (yellow card) 1'; Wells 4'; Gobern (yellow card) 75'; Clayton (yellow card) 90+1' | Stadium: Madejski Stadium; Attendance: 17,649; Referee: Keith Stroud |

| 5 April 2014 40 | Huddersfield Town | 0–1 | Bolton Wanderers | Huddersfield |
| 15:00 | Gobern (yellow card) 15' | | Medo (yellow card) 84'; Mason 90+2' | Stadium: John Smith's Stadium; Attendance: 15,120; Referee: Jeremy Simpson |

| 8 April 2014 41 | Huddersfield Town | 0–2 | Ipswich Town | Huddersfield |
| 19:45 | Gobern (yellow card) 86' | | Anderson 6'; Murphy 33'; Hunt (yellow card) 68' | Stadium: John Smith's Stadium; Attendance: 11,857; Referee: Mark Brown |

| 12 April 2014 42 | Derby County | 3–1 | Huddersfield Town | Derby |
| 15:07 | Russell 28'; Smithies 50' (o.g.); Martin 57' (pen.) | | Clarke (yellow card) 5' (yellow-red card) 56'; Wells 14'; Lynch (yellow card) 31' (yellow-red card) 43'; Gerrard (yellow card) 57' | Stadium: iPro Stadium; Attendance: 25,809; Referee: Darren Deadman |

| 18 April 2014 43 | Huddersfield Town | 1–1 | Brighton & Hove Albion | Huddersfield |
| 15:00 | Norwood 6' (yellow card) 72'; Gerrard (yellow card) 23'; Hogg (yellow card) 37'; Woods (yellow card) 47' | | Dunk (yellow card) 36'; Greer (yellow card) 77'; Stephens (yellow card) 81'; Bruno 83' | Stadium: John Smith's Stadium; Attendance: 13,460; Referee: Andy Davies |

| 21 April 2014 44 | Yeovil Town | 1–2 | Huddersfield Town | Yeovil |
| 15:00 | Lawrence 73' | | Wallace (yellow card) 65'; Wells 69'; Clayton 90+7' | Stadium: Huish Park; Attendance: 5,903; Referee: Stuart Attwell |

| 26 April 2014 45 | Huddersfield Town | 0–2 | Leicester City | Huddersfield |
| 15:00 | | | Taylor-Fletcher 31'; Morgan 75' | Stadium: John Smith's Stadium; Attendance: 16,481; Referee: Iain Williamson |

| 3 May 2014 46 | Watford | 1–4 | Huddersfield Town | Watford |
| 12:15 | Hoban (yellow card) 42'; Tőzsér (yellow card) 64'; Angella (yellow card) 83'; Deeney 90+3' (pen.) | | Lolley 46'; Ward 55', 65', 87'; Hogg (yellow card) 72'; Gerrard (yellow card) 83' | Stadium: Vicarage Road; Attendance: 15,370; Referee: David Coote |

=== FA Cup ===
| 4 January 2014 Round 3 | Grimsby Town | 2–3 | Huddersfield Town | Cleethorpes |
| 15:00 | Hannah 25'; Disley 62' (yellow card) 62'; Rodman (yellow card) 89' | | Norwood 51' (yellow card) 66'; Hammill (yellow card) 55'; Dixon (yellow card) 69'; Paterson 86' (yellow card) 89'; Thomas 90' (o.g.) | Stadium: Blundell Park; Attendance: 6,504; Referee: Keith Stroud |

| 25 January 2014 Round 4 | Huddersfield Town | 0–1 | Charlton Athletic | Huddersfield |
| 15:00 | Gerrard (yellow card) 31' | | Stephens (yellow card) 29'; Morrison (yellow card) 31'; Church 54' | Stadium: John Smith's Stadium; Attendance: 10,120; Referee: Stuart Attwell |

=== Football League Cup ===
| 6 August 2013 Round 1 | Huddersfield Town | 2–1 | Bradford City | Huddersfield |
| 19:45 | Vaughan 42', 54'; Clayton (yellow card) 90+3' | | Wells 90' | Stadium: John Smith's Stadium; Attendance: 11,630; Referee: Mark Haywood |

| 27 August 2013 Round 2 | Huddersfield Town | 3–2 | Charlton Athletic | Huddersfield |
| 19:45 | Hammill (yellow card) 37' (goal) 82'; Lynch 40' (yellow card) 89'; Hogg 77' | | Stephens 32'; Sordell (yellow card) 49' (goal) 59' | Stadium: John Smith's Stadium; Attendance: 6,250; Referee: Geoff Eltringham |

| 24 September 2013 Round 3 | Hull City | 1–0 | Huddersfield Town | Kingston upon Hull |
| 19:45 | Proschwitz 59'; Faye (yellow card) 68' | | Woods (yellow card) 39' | Stadium: KC Stadium; Attendance: 7,151; Referee: Simon Hooper |
