= Opportune =

Opportune may refer to:

- HMS Opportune (S20), an Oberon class submarine
- USS Opportune (ARS-41), a Bolster-class rescue and salvage ship

== See also ==
- Opportunity (disambiguation)
- Sainte-Opportune
