= Jordan Sinnott =

English footballer (1994–2020)

Personal information
- Full name: Jordan James Sinnott
- Date of birth: 14 February 1994
- Place of birth: Bradford, England
- Date of death: 25 January 2020 (aged 25)
- Place of death: Sheffield, England
- Position: Midfielder

Youth career
- 2008–2012: Huddersfield Town

Senior career*
Years	Team	Apps	(Gls)
2012–2015	Huddersfield Town	2	(0)
2012–2013	→ Altrincham (loan)	6	(0)
2013	→ Bury (loan)	9	(1)
2015–2016	Altrincham	57	(4)
2016–2017	FC Halifax Town	32	(7)
2017–2018	Chesterfield	8	(1)
2018–2019	Alfreton Town	26	(5)
2019–2020	Matlock Town	12	(1)
Total		152	(19)
- * Club domestic league appearances and goals

Jordan James Sinnott (14 February 1994 – 25 January 2020) was an English footballer who played as a midfielder. He was the son of the former Huddersfield Town captain Lee Sinnott and was contracted to Northern Premier League side Matlock Town at the time of his death in January 2020. He died following an altercation in Retford town centre where he was attacked.

== Career ==
=== Huddersfield Town ===
He attended St Mary's Catholic High School in Menston and, later, joined Huddersfield's Town Academy in the late 2000s, eventually becoming the captain of the under-18 team in 2012. During the same year, Sinnott was offered a professional contract.

Following the sacking of Simon Grayson as Huddersfield manager on 24 January 2013, the manager of the under-18 team, Mark Lillis, was promoted to the role of caretaker manager, and gave Sinnott his first appearance in the Huddersfield first team in their 1–1 draw against Leicester City in the 4th round of the FA Cup at the John Smith's Stadium on 26 January 2013. After the match, Sinnott expressed being positive on his debut and described himself as "not really the nervous type!" His first league appearance was as a substitute in Town's 6–1 defeat by Nottingham Forest at the City Ground on 19 February 2013.

Despite only making two appearances, Sinnott was offered a new two-year contract by the club, which he signed, keeping him at the club until 2015.

After eight years at the club, Sinnott was released by Huddersfield after having his contract terminated by mutual consent on 2 February 2015, with his contract due to expire in the summer.

=== Loan spells ===
After being told by Huddersfield Town's management that he would be loaned out, it was announced on 6 December 2012, he joined his father, Lee, at Conference North side Altrincham for a month, making six appearances before returning in January 2013.

On 7 August 2013, Sinnott joined Bury on a six-month loan from Huddersfield Town. Sinnott then made his Bury debut three days later, coming on as a substitute for John Rooney in the second half, in a 2–1 loss against Oxford United. Sinnott then scored his first goal in the next game, as Bury beat Accrington Stanley 3–0. After making 10 appearances for the Shakers, he was recalled by Huddersfield on 18 October.

=== Later career ===
After being released by Huddersfield Town, Sinnott rejoined his father at Conference side Altrincham for the second time. He then had spells at FC Halifax Town and Chesterfield before joining Alfreton Town in 2018; at the time of his death he was playing for Matlock Town.

== Death ==
Sinnott was found unconscious with a suspected fractured skull in Retford, Nottinghamshire, in the early hours of 25 January 2020, following an altercation in which he was attacked and sustained a head injury. He was admitted to the Northern General Hospital in Sheffield in a critical condition where he died just before 19:00 that evening. Matlock Town and his former club Alfreton Town had both postponed their respective matches earlier that day. Police arrested two men in connection with the fight.

He carried a donor card at the time of his death.

In a tribute following his death, Sinnott's brother Tom, as well as his friend Duane Holmes, sent an appeal to football clubs across the country to send in shirts with Sinnott's name on the back for his funeral. 800 different football shirts were donated from around the world, these were displayed at his funeral at Bradford City's stadium. It was announced that after the funeral, the football shirts would be donated to Sport Relief.

In July 2020, two men, Kai Denovan and Cameron Matthews, were jailed for manslaughter for their part in the "violent, drunken attack" that killed Sinnott. Denovan was jailed for eleven years and Matthews for eight years and three months. A third man, Sean Nicholson, pleaded guilty to affray and was sentenced to fourteen months in prison.

Sinnott was engaged to Kelly Bossons. Following Sinnott's funeral, Bossons discovered she was pregnant with Sinnott's child. Their daughter was born in September 2020.

== Career statistics ==
=== Club ===
Club	Season	League			FA Cup		Other		Total	
Club	Season	Division	Apps	Goals	Apps	Goals	Apps	Goals	Apps	Goals
Huddersfield Town	2012–13	Championship	1	0	2	0	—		3	0
Huddersfield Town	2013–14	Championship	0	0	1	0	—		1	0
Huddersfield Town	2014–15	Championship	1	0	0	0	—		1	0
Huddersfield Town	Total		2	0	3	0	—		5	0
Altrincham (loan)	2012–13	Conference North	6	0	0	0	0	0	6	0
Bury (loan)	2013–14	League Two	9	1	0	0	1 (Note: Appearances in Football League Trophy)	0	10	1
Altrincham	2014–15	Conference Premier	13	1	0	0	0	0	13	1
Altrincham	2015–16	National League	44	3	3	0	3 (Note: Appearances in FA Trophy)	0	50	3
Altrincham	Total		57	4	3	0	3	0	63	4
FC Halifax Town	2016–17	National League North	32	7	5	2	3 (Note: Appearances in National League North play-offs)	0	40	9
Chesterfield	2017–18	League Two	8	1	1	0	2	1	11	2
Alfreton Town	2018–19	National League North	26	5	1	1	0	0	27	6
Matlock Town	2019–20	Northern Premier League Premier Division	12	1	2	1	8 (Note: Five appearances two goals in FA Trophy, one appearance in Derbyshire Senior Cup, two appearances three goals in Northern Premier League Challenge Cup)	5	22	7
Career total			152	19	15	4	17	6	184	29
