= Card Factory =

Retailer of greeting cards and gifts in the United Kingdom

Card Factory plc
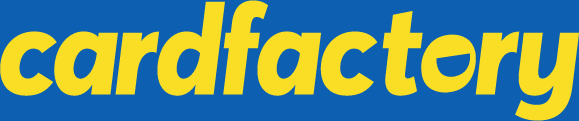
- Formerly: CF Listco Limited 17–30 April 2014); Card Factory Limited (30 Apr 2014)
- Type: Public company
- Traded as: LSE: CARD
- Industry: Retail
- Founded: 1997; 29 years ago
- Founders: Dean & Janet Hoyle
- Headquarters: Wakefield, West Yorkshire
- Area served: United Kingdom
- Key people: Geoff Cooper (Chairman); Darcy Willson-Rymer (CEO)
- Products: Greeting Cards, Calendars
- Brands: Funky Pigeon
- Revenue: ▲£582.7 million (2026)
- Operating income: ▼£59.4 million (2026)
- Net income: ▼£31.2 million (2026)
- Owner: Invesco (27%); Artemis (fund managers) (12%); Old Mutual Global Investors (10%)
- Website: cardfactory.co.uk

Card Factory, Southside Wandsworth, London

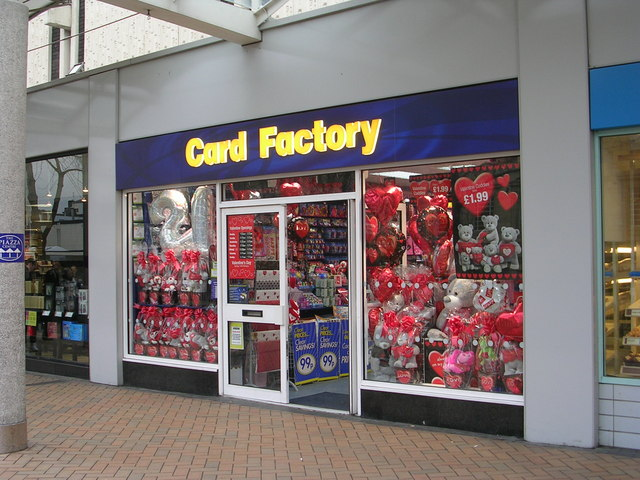
Card Factory store in Huddersfield, West Yorkshire

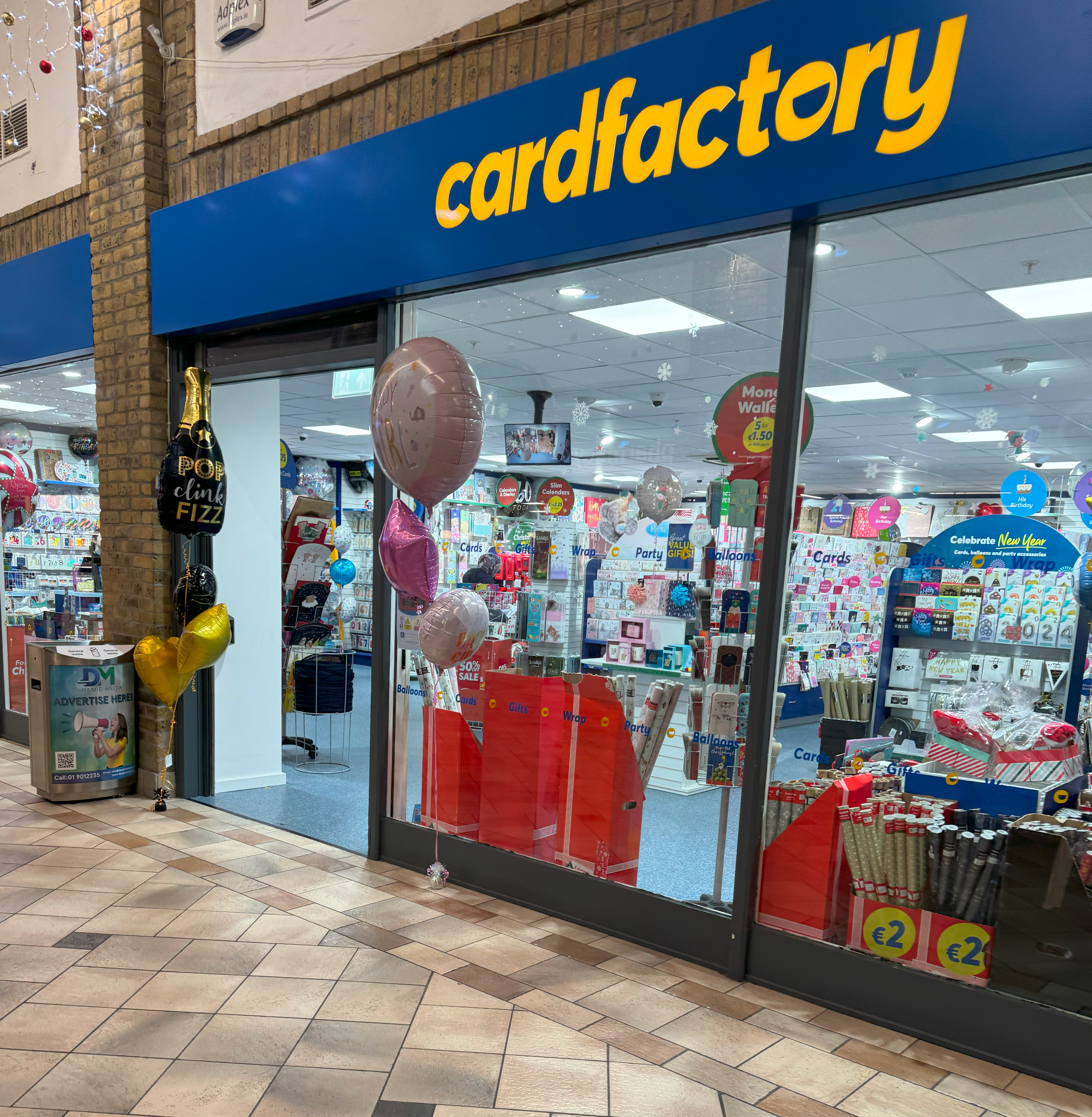
Card Factory store in Mullingar, County Westmeath, Ireland

Card Factory plc is a retailer of greeting cards and gifts in the United Kingdom founded in Wakefield by Dean Hoyle and his wife Janet. The first store opened in 1997, and by 2020 the company had over 1,000 stores. The company also operates two retail websites and has mobile apps for both iPhone and Android. It is listed on the London Stock Exchange.

== History ==
=== Origins to 2009 ===
Dean Hoyle left school with no qualifications, having a self confessed greater interest in football. With his wife Janet, from 1993 they began buying cards wholesale, and selling them from the back of their van at car boot sales and public open air events.

In 1997, they opened their first shop under within the holding company Sportswift Ltd, purposefully choosing secondary retail locations which were cheaper. After opening a few stores, whilst Janet founded and headed up the internal design and print function, Dean concentrated on expanding the business, with a nominal target of 500 retail outlets. This gave the company a profit margin advantage over rivals, including Clinton Cards.

The couple built a board to expand the business, including: Keith Pacey (chairman of Maplin); Richard Hayes (managing director, their ex bank manager); Chris Beck (commercial director, ex Grant Thornton); Darren Bryant (group finance director, ex PricewaterhouseCoopers). On 28 November 2008, Card Factory purchased about 80 of the 288 stores from failed greetings card company Celebrations Group (which traded as Card Warehouse and Cardfair), as part of a rescue package, securing around 500 of the 1,800 jobs at Celebrations.

=== 2010s ===
The couple put the business up for sale in January 2010 and on 8 April 2010, Charterhouse completed the £350 million purchase of the company which at the time operated 480 stores. This enabled Dean Hoyle to later buy Huddersfield Town F.C.

On 14 July 2011, Card Factory purchased gettingpersonal.co.uk, an online retailer of personalised gifts, for an undisclosed sum.

In May 2014, the company floated via an initial public offering on the London Stock Exchange.

In April 2015, the company launched its own website, cardfactory.co.uk.

In 2019, the company began supplying cards to Aldi, Matalan and The Reject Shop.

=== 2020s ===
Card Factory shops were shut for much of 2020 and the beginning of 2021 due to the COVID-19 pandemic. Revenue from the website more than doubled during this period, and the website was relaunched in August 2020 to enable cards to be personalised, matching similar offerings to Moonpig and Funky Pigeon. In late 2020, the company launched mobile apps for both iPhone and Android devices. In December 2020, Costcutter boss Darcy Willson-Rymer was appointed as chief executive.

In 2024, Card Factory sold an exclusive East 17 Christmas card to mark the 30th anniversary of the band's Christmas single Stay Another Day. A portion of the revenue raised by sales of the card were donated to music therapy charity Nordoff and Robbins.

On 15 August 2025 Card Factory completed the acquisition of Funky Pigeon from WHSmith for £24m; the brand would become one of Card Factory's main businesses and would boost its online presence.

== Operations ==
The company operates some 1,000 stores. Macmillan Cancer Support is the company's chosen charity; Card Factory donations to the charity had totalled £1 million by 2008 and £3 million by 2014.

== Controversy ==
The company has been successfully prosecuted for Health and Safety infringements on a number of occasions. Incidents have included poor stock management, blocking of fire exits, overstocking of stores, damaged equipment, inadequate risk assessments and staff training.

In 2008, the company was fined £15,000 after an elderly woman tripped over a cardboard box that had fallen from a display area in an aisle and fractured her thigh. She was rushed to a local hospital, where she had to undergo an emergency hip operation. She later died while recovering from the incident, after catching Clostridioides difficile. The company was fined under Regulation 3 of the Reporting of Injuries, Diseases and Dangerous Occurrences Regulations 1995, for failing to report the incident promptly.

In December 2024, the company faced criticism for not meeting recommended gender diversity targets on its board. Despite a prior commitment to achieve 40% female representation by December 2024, the company maintained only two women on its six-member board, stating it was not in shareholders' interests to appoint an additional director solely to meet this target.
