= Adam Clayton (footballer) =

English footballer (born 1989)

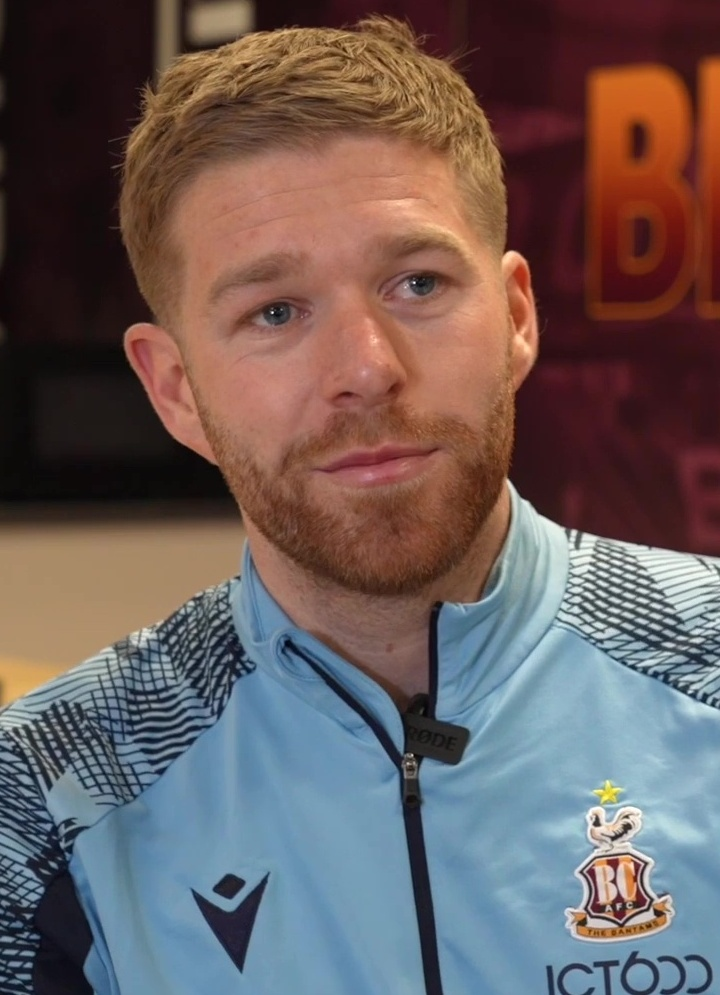
- Clayton with Bradford City in 2023

Personal information
- Full name: Adam Stephen Clayton
- Date of birth: 14 January 1989 (age 37)
- Place of birth: Manchester, England
- Height: 5 ft 9 in (1.75 m)
- Position: Midfielder

Youth career
- 1996–2008: Manchester City

Senior career*
| Years | Team | Apps | (Gls) |
| 2008–2010 | Manchester City | 0 | (0) |
| 2009–2010 | → Carlisle United (loan) | 28 | (1) |
| 2010 | → Leeds United (loan) | 2 | (0) |
| 2010–2012 | Leeds United | 45 | (6) |
| 2010–2011 | → Peterborough United (loan) | 7 | (0) |
| 2011 | → Milton Keynes Dons (loan) | 6 | (1) |
| 2012–2014 | Huddersfield Town | 85 | (11) |
| 2014–2020 | Middlesbrough | 213 | (1) |
| 2020–2021 | Birmingham City | 14 | (0) |
| 2022–2023 | Doncaster Rovers | 33 | (0) |
| 2023 | Bradford City | 14 | (0) |
| 2023–2024 | Rochdale | 27 | (0) |
| 2024 | Liversedge | 10 | (0) |
| 2024–2025 | Matlock Town | 24 | (2) |
| Total | | 508 | (22) |

International career
| 2009 | England U20 | 4 | (0) |

Managerial career
- 2025–2026: Matlock Town
- 2026: Hartlepool United (joint-interim)
- * Club domestic league appearances and goals

Adam Stephen Clayton (born 14 January 1989) is an English professional football coach and former player who played as a midfielder.

His professional career started at Manchester City. While a City player, he enjoyed loan spells at Carlisle United, with whom he reached the 2010 Football League Trophy Final, and Leeds United, where his loan spell was made permanent basis in 2010. Clayton then had further loan spells at Peterborough United and Milton Keynes Dons before becoming a regular in Leeds' team in the 2011–12 season. He then spent two years with Huddersfield Town, and signed for Middlesbrough in 2014. While at the club, he was promoted to and relegated from the Premier League and formed a midfield partnership with Grant Leadbitter. He spent six seasons at Middlesbrough before leaving the club in 2020 when his contract expired, and then joined another Championship club, Birmingham City, where he stayed until November 2021. Clayton signed for Doncaster Rovers in January 2022, Bradford City took over his contract a year later, and he spent the 2023–24 season with Rochdale and began the following campaign with Liversedge before taking up a player-coach role with Matlock Town.

He was a member of England's under-20 team at the 2009 FIFA U-20 World Cup.

== Club career ==
=== Manchester City ===
Clayton was born in Manchester. He joined Manchester City at the age of seven, and signed his first professional contract with the club in May 2007. Given the number 31 shirt for the 2008–09 season, Clayton was an unused substitute in the Premier League match against West Bromwich Albion in December 2008, and again in an FA Cup tie against Nottingham Forest in January 2009. On 5 May, he signed a two-year contract extension.

==== Carlisle United (loan) ====
After seeking the advice of his teammate Craig Bellamy, Clayton joined League One club Carlisle United on 2 November 2009 on loan until January 2010. He made his professional debut five days later in a 2–2 draw with Morecambe in the FA Cup, coming on as a second-half substitute for Tom Taiwo. On 10 November, Clayton scored his first senior goal in Carlisle's 3–1 away win against Chesterfield in the Football League Trophy, and he made his Football League debut four days later in a 3–2 loss to Bristol Rovers. In the last match of his loan spell, Clayton's poor backpass led to Everton taking the lead in the FA Cup third round, but within minutes, he made a powerful run and his shot was deflected in for an equaliser; Everton scored two late goals to win 3–1.

The loan was extended to the end of the season. He scored against Leeds United in the Football League Trophy semifinal second leg, and converted his penalty in the shootout that took Carlisle through to the final. Clayton played the whole of the final, which Carlisle lost 4–1 to Southampton. He made 36 appearances for Carlisle in all competitions and scored three goals.

=== Leeds United ===
Clayton joined Championship club Leeds United on a month's loan on 6 August 2010, and made his debut the following day as a 76th-minute substitute in a 2–1 home defeat against Derby County. Manchester City refused permission for him to play in the League Cup. After one more brief outing, Clayton signed a three-year permanent contract with Leeds; the fee was undisclosed.

==== Loan spells ====
Clayton joined League One club Peterborough United on 19 November on a month's loan to gain experience and match fitness. He made his debut as a second-half substitute against Southampton, impressed when the weather permitted, and the loan was extended until 30 January 2011. Although Leeds had refused permission for Clayton to play in the FA Cup second round, he was allowed to play in the third round, in which Peterborough lost heavily to Premiership team Fulham, and finished his loan spell with eight appearances.

Having got no closer to Leeds' first team, Clayton joined another League One club, Milton Keynes Dons, on 24 March on loan until the end of the season. He made six league appearances and scored once – a stoppage-time winner against his former club Carlisle United – to help MK Dons reach the play-off semifinals, in which they were eliminated 4–3 on aggregate by Peterborough United. MK Dons manager Karl Robinson felt Clayton was one of the better players in League One and would re-sign him if the opportunity arose, but expected him to make a success of the coming season with Leeds.

==== Return to Leeds ====
After first-choice midfielders Neil Kilkenny and Bradley Johnson both left Leeds United in the 2011–12 pre-season, Clayton declared himself ready to challenge for a place. He started pre-season alongside Jonny Howson and Michael Brown in a five-man midfield, and made his first competitive start in the opening fixture, a 3–1 loss to Southampton in which he won a penalty which was converted by Max Gradel. He assisted Ramón Núñez' first goal in a 3–2 victory against Bradford City in the League Cup. Having come close to scoring his first Leeds goal with "the most audacious of attempts from distance which almost caught out" Middlesbrough's goalkeeper, Carl Ikeme, on 13 August, he succeeded a week later with a late equaliser against West Ham United; the Yorkshire Evening Post had suggested that facing an opposing midfield as strong as West Ham's would be "the essence of an acid test" for any aspiring midfielder.

By mid-September, he was reportedly attracting the interest of several Premiership clubs, but said he was hoping to stay at Leeds for "a very long time". His third goal of the season came against his former club Peterborough United on 22 October, and the matchwinner against Leicester City on 6 November, when "a loose ball fell to Clayton who connected first time to send a 25-yard (23 m) curler into the top corner past a helpless Schmeichel", earned him the club's Goal of the Season award. In April 2012, Clayton received a two-match ban for accumulating ten yellow cards over the course of the season.

After his first season as a regular and with one year left on his contract, Clayton told the press that he was discussing an extension and hoped to stay on at Leeds. Terms could not be agreed, and he was one of six senior players transfer-listed by Neil Warnock, who explained that no player would leave unless the club received a suitable offer, and if Clayton did not leave, he would be welcome to fight for his place in 2012–13.

=== Huddersfield Town ===
On 6 July 2012, former Leeds manager Simon Grayson signed Clayton for newly promoted Huddersfield Town for a fee of £350,000. He was given the number 8 shirt, formerly worn by teammate Anthony Kay. He made his Huddersfield début in the League Cup first round 2–0 away defeat to Preston North End on 13 August 2012, playing the full 90 minutes of the game. Clayton made his league début in a 1–0 defeat by Cardiff City at the Cardiff City Stadium on 17 August. He scored his first goal for Huddersfield with the opening goal in the side's 2–2 league draw away to Ipswich Town on 1 September 2012. Clayton scored his second Huddersfield goal with a penalty in a 3–1 win over Sheffield Wednesday on 19 September 2012. During January 2014, Huddersfield rejected a £1 million transfer bid from Brighton & Hove Albion to sign Clayton. He ended the 2013–14 season by winning the club's Player of the Year award after making 42 league appearances, scoring 7 goals.

=== Middlesbrough ===
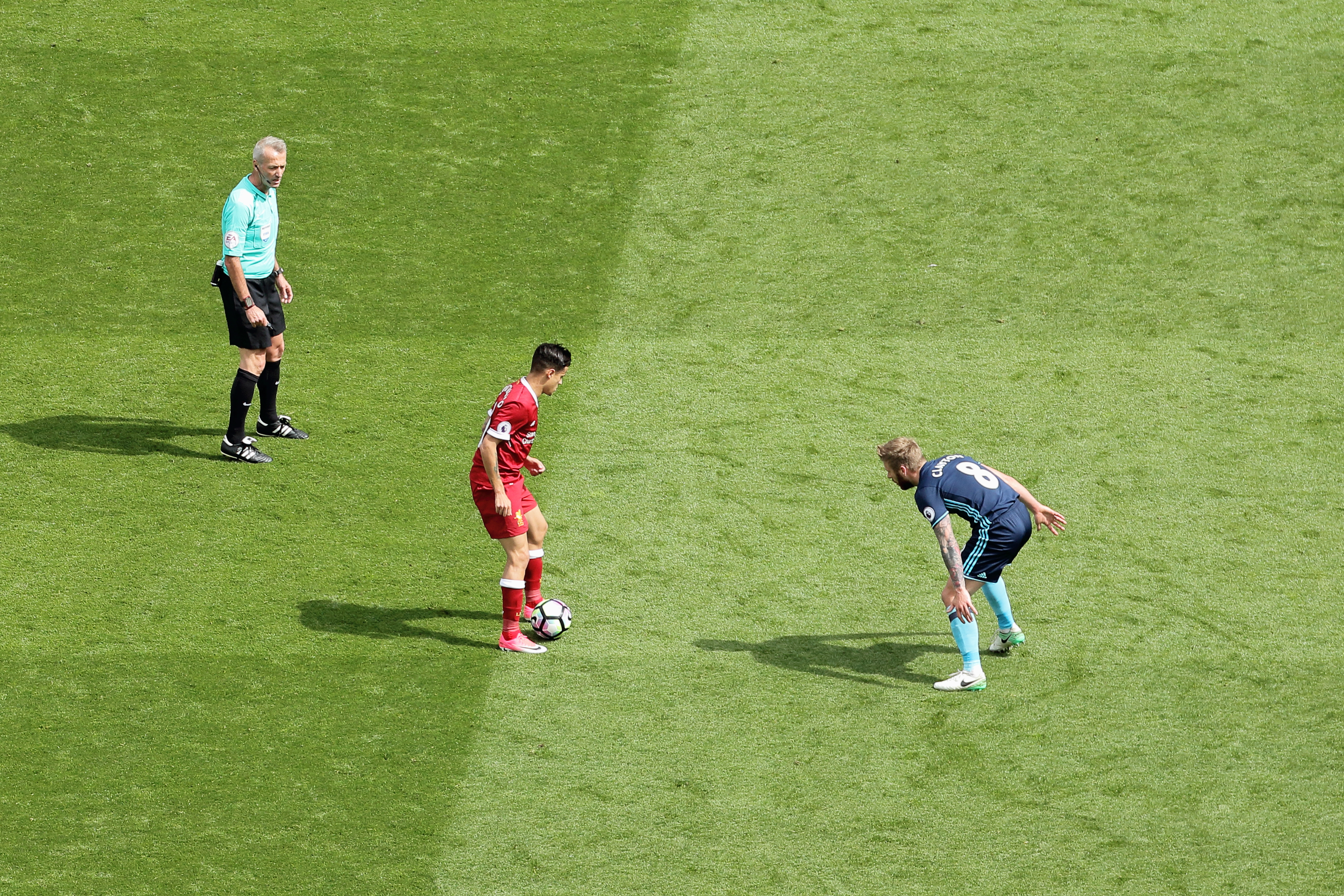
Clayton (right) watches Liverpool's Philippe Coutinho on the final day of the 2016–17 Premier League season

On 13 August 2014, Clayton signed a four-year deal with Middlesbrough after a long transfer process for an undisclosed fee believed to be £1.5 million plus add-ons. He was handed the number 8 shirt, previously worn by Jacob Butterfield who signed for Huddersfield in the swap deal.

Adam Clayton became an integral player in the Middlesbrough midfield under manager Aitor Karanka, forming a formidable partnership alongside club captain Grant Leadbitter.

On 7 May 2016, Clayton won promotion to the Premier League with Middlesbrough after a 1–1 draw at home against Brighton & Hove Albion.

With the arrival of Marten de Roon in the summer of 2016, it was reported that Clayton and Leadbitter could leave Middlesbrough, though they both stayed, as Karanka promised the midfield duo game time in the Premier League. Despite their efforts, the club were immediately relegated back down to the Championship for the 2017–18 season.

Garry Monk replaced Karanka as manager for the forthcoming Championship season, and brought in two new central midfielders Lewis Baker and Jonny Howson, though Clayton continued to play regular first team football. However, the club failed to meet their league expectations, with them placed just below the play-off positions, Monk was sacked, to be replaced by Tony Pulis shortly afterwards.

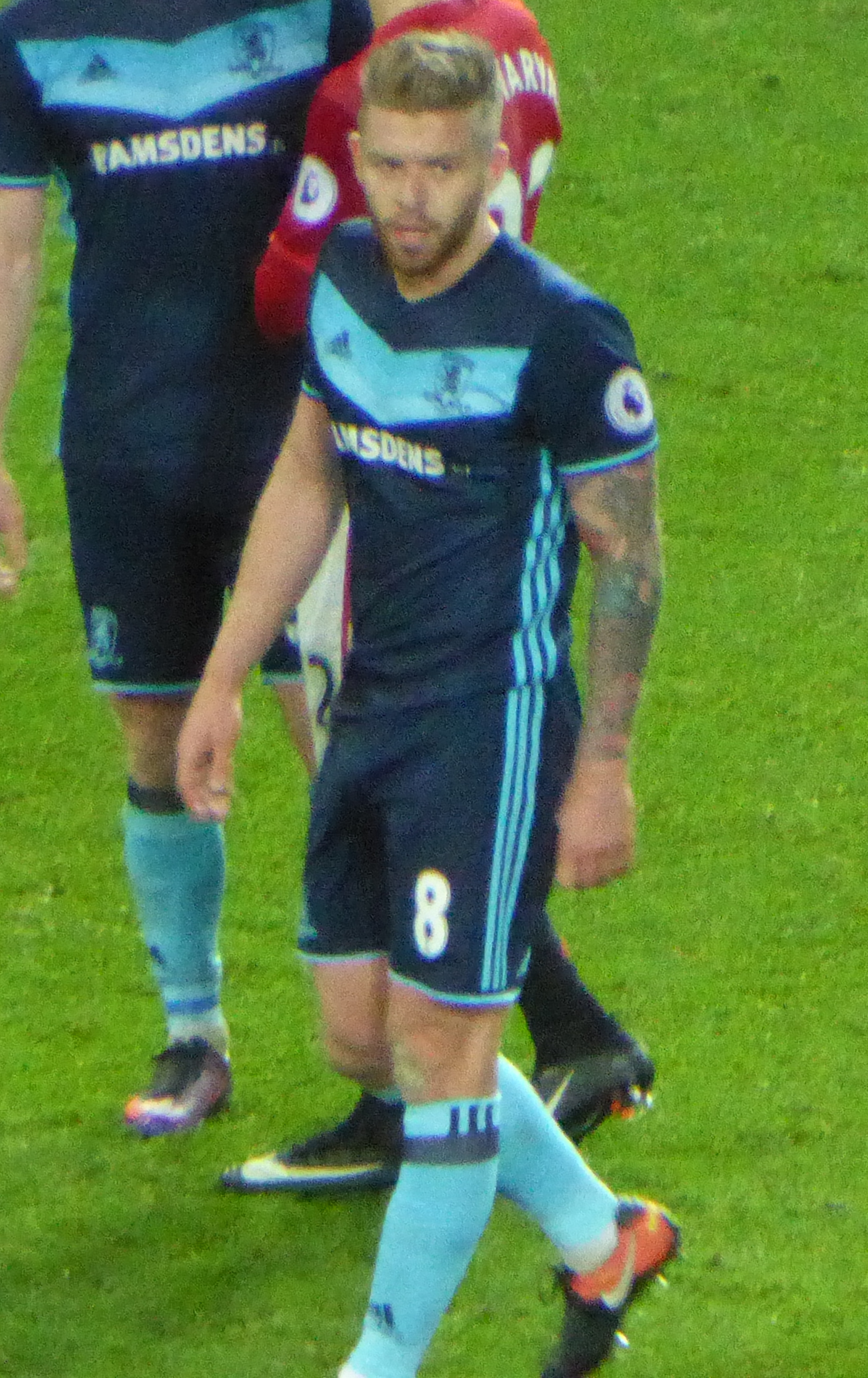
Clayton playing for Middlesbrough in December 2016

When Karanka returned to management with a poor-performing Nottingham Forest side, it was reported that Karanka was looking to sign his former Middlesbrough stars, including Clayton, Leadbitter and Patrick Bamford. However, they all pledged their loyalty and commitment to Middlesbrough and stayed at the Riverside, though fellow Middlesbrough midfielder Adlène Guedioura left to return to Forest, one of his former clubs.

Having failed to agree to a new contract, Clayton confirmed his departure through social media, with the club also reporting the news the following day: new manager Neil Warnock had informed him that he was not needed at the club and he departed on holiday on the same day as the final game of the Championship season.

=== Birmingham City ===
On 1 September 2020, Clayton joined his former manager Aitor Karanka at Birmingham City, where he signed a two-year contract with an option for a further year. He made his debut as a second-half substitute in the opening fixture of the season, a 1–0 defeat at home to fourth-tier Cambridge United in the EFL Cup. He began the season well, but conceded a penalty from which Sheffield Wednesday inflicted Birmingham's first league defeat under Karanka, and was sent off three days later near the end of the visit to Norwich City, who promptly scored a winning goal. A foot injury reduced his mobility, and a mistake that led to Coventry City's equaliser at the end of January earned him "swingeing criticism". Although Karanka said he still had faith in him, Clayton never played for the club again. His contract was terminated by mutual consent on 5 November 2021.

=== Doncaster Rovers ===
Clayton signed an 18-month contract with League One club Doncaster Rovers in January 2022. He made his debut on 29 January as a late substitute in a home defeat to Plymouth Argyle, and started the next match, at home to Rotherham United, but according to the Doncaster Free Press, "looked well off the pace" and was replaced at half time.

=== Bradford City ===
Having played little under new head coach Danny Schofield, Clayton joined divisional rivals Bradford City on 19 January 2023 on a short-term contract until the end of the season. He left the club when his contract expired.

=== Later career ===
Clayton signed a one-year contract with National League club Rochdale on 10 July 2023. He left the club at the end of the 2023–24 season.

In August 2024, Clayton signed for Northern Premier League Division One East club Liversedge. He made 11 appearances in all competitions before moving on to Northern Premier League Premier Division club Matlock Town in October as player/coach.

== International career ==
Clayton was called into the England under-20 squad for a friendly against Italy in March 2009 to replace Tom Cleverley, who withdrew from the original selection. England won 2–0, and Clayton made his international debut as a second-half substitute for Josh Walker. He was a member of England's squad for the 2009 U20 World Cup, where he wore the number 4 shirt. He started two of England's three matches as they were eliminated at the group stage.

== Coaching career ==
In March 2025, Clayton was appointed interim player-manager of Matlock Town following the departure of Ryan Cresswell until the end of the 2024–25 season. Despite being unable to save the club from relegation, he was appointed to the role permanently on 28 April 2025. On 27 December 2025, Clayton was sacked with the club in third position, seven points behind league leaders Redcar Athletic. However, two days later, Clayton was reinstated as Matlock manager. On 26 March 2026, Clayton was sacked for a second time following a 4–2 defeat to Redcar Athletic, securing their opposition the league title.

In June 2026, Clayton reunited with his former Huddersfield Town manager Lee Clark, signing a two-year deal to become assistant first-team head coach at National League club Hartlepool United. Following Clark's resignation on 19 September 2026, Clayton took joint-interim charge of Hartlepool alongside Gary Liddle. In November 2026, Clayton departed Hartlepool.

== Career statistics ==
Appearances and goals by club, season and competition
| Club | Season | League | | | FA Cup | | League Cup | | Other | | Total | |
| Club | Season | Division | Apps | Goals | Apps | Goals | Apps | Goals | Apps | Goals | Apps | Goals |
|---|---|---|---|---|---|---|---|---|---|---|---|---|
| Manchester City | 2008–09 | Premier League | 0 | 0 | 0 | 0 | 0 | 0 | 0 | 0 | 0 | 0 |
| Manchester City | 2009–10 | Premier League | 0 | 0 | — | | 0 | 0 | — | | 0 | 0 |
| Manchester City | Total | | 0 | 0 | 0 | 0 | 0 | 0 | 0 | 0 | 0 | 0 |
| Carlisle United (loan) | 2009–10 | League One | 28 | 1 | 3 | 0 | — | | 5 (Note: Appearances in Football League Trophy) | 2 | 36 | 3 |
| Leeds United | 2010–11 | Championship | 4 | 0 | — | | 0 | 0 | — | | 4 | 0 |
| Leeds United | 2011–12 | Championship | 43 | 6 | 1 | 0 | 2 | 0 | — | | 46 | 6 |
| Leeds United | Total | | 47 | 6 | 1 | 0 | 2 | 0 | — | | 50 | 6 |
| Peterborough United (loan) | 2010–11 | League One | 7 | 0 | 1 | 0 | — | | — | | 8 | 0 |
| Milton Keynes Dons (loan) | 2010–11 | League One | 6 | 1 | — | | — | | 2 (Note: Appearances in League One play-offs) | 0 | 8 | 1 |
| Huddersfield Town | 2012–13 | Championship | 43 | 4 | 4 | 1 | 1 | 0 | — | | 48 | 5 |
| Huddersfield Town | 2013–14 | Championship | 42 | 7 | 2 | 0 | 2 | 0 | — | | 46 | 7 |
| Huddersfield Town | Total | | 85 | 11 | 6 | 1 | 3 | 0 | — | | 94 | 12 |
| Middlesbrough | 2014–15 | Championship | 41 | 0 | 3 | 0 | 2 | 0 | 3 (Note: Appearances in Championship play-offs) | 0 | 49 | 0 |
| Middlesbrough | 2015–16 | Championship | 43 | 1 | 1 | 0 | 4 | 0 | — | | 48 | 1 |
| Middlesbrough | 2016–17 | Premier League | 34 | 0 | 4 | 0 | 1 | 0 | — | | 39 | 0 |
| Middlesbrough | 2017–18 | Championship | 32 | 0 | 2 | 0 | 1 | 0 | 2 | 0 | 37 | 0 |
| Middlesbrough | 2018–19 | Championship | 36 | 0 | 2 | 0 | 0 | 0 | — | | 38 | 0 |
| Middlesbrough | 2019–20 | Championship | 27 | 0 | 2 | 0 | 1 | 0 | — | | 30 | 0 |
| Middlesbrough | Total | | 213 | 1 | 14 | 0 | 9 | 0 | 5 | 0 | 241 | 1 |
| Birmingham City | 2020–21 | Championship | 14 | 0 | 1 | 0 | 1 | 0 | — | | 16 | 0 |
| Birmingham City | 2021–22 | Championship | 0 | 0 | — | | 0 | 0 | — | | 0 | 0 |
| Birmingham City | Total | | 14 | 0 | 1 | 0 | 1 | 0 | — | | 16 | 0 |
| Doncaster Rovers | 2021–22 | League One | 12 | 0 | — | | — | | — | | 12 | 0 |
| Doncaster Rovers | 2022–23 | League Two | 21 | 0 | 1 | 0 | 1 | 0 | 0 | 0 | 23 | 0 |
| Doncaster Rovers | Total | | 33 | 0 | 1 | 0 | 1 | 0 | 0 | 0 | 35 | 0 |
| Bradford City | 2022–23 | League Two | 14 | 0 | — | | — | | 2 (Note: Appearances in League Two play-offs) | 0 | 16 | 0 |
| Rochdale | 2023–24 | National League | 27 | 0 | 1 | 0 | — | | 1 (Note: Appearance in FA Trophy) | 0 | 29 | 0 |
| Liversedge | 2024–25 | Northern Premier League (NPL); Division One East | 10 | 0 | 0 | 0 | — | | 1 | 0 | 11 | 0 |
| Matlock Town | 2024–25 | NPL Premier Division | 24 | 2 | — | | — | | 0 | 0 | 24 | 2 |
| Career total | | | 508 | 22 | 28 | 1 | 16 | 0 | 16 | 2 | 568 | 25 |

== Honours ==
Carlisle United

- Football League Trophy runner-up: 2009–10

Middlesbrough

- Football League Championship runner-up: 2015–16

Individual

- PFA Team of the Year: 2015–16 Championship
- Huddersfield Town Player of the Year: 2013–14
- Middlesbrough Supporters' Player of the Year: 2015–16
