= The Works (retailer) =

British discount store chain

TheWorks plc
- Type: Public
- Industry: Retail
- Founded: 1981
- Headquarters: Coleshill, Warwickshire, England
- Number of locations: 525 (stores)
- Area served: United Kingdom; Ireland
- Key people: Dean Hoyle (Chairman); Gavin Peck (Group CEO)
- Products: Books, stationery, arts, crafts and toys
- Revenue: ▲£264.6 million (2022)
- Owner: Dean Hoyle (15%)
- Website: theworks.co.uk

TheWorks plc trading as The Works, is a discount retailer based in the United Kingdom selling books, art and craft materials, gifts, toys, games and stationery. It has more than 500 stores across the UK and Ireland as of November 2026.

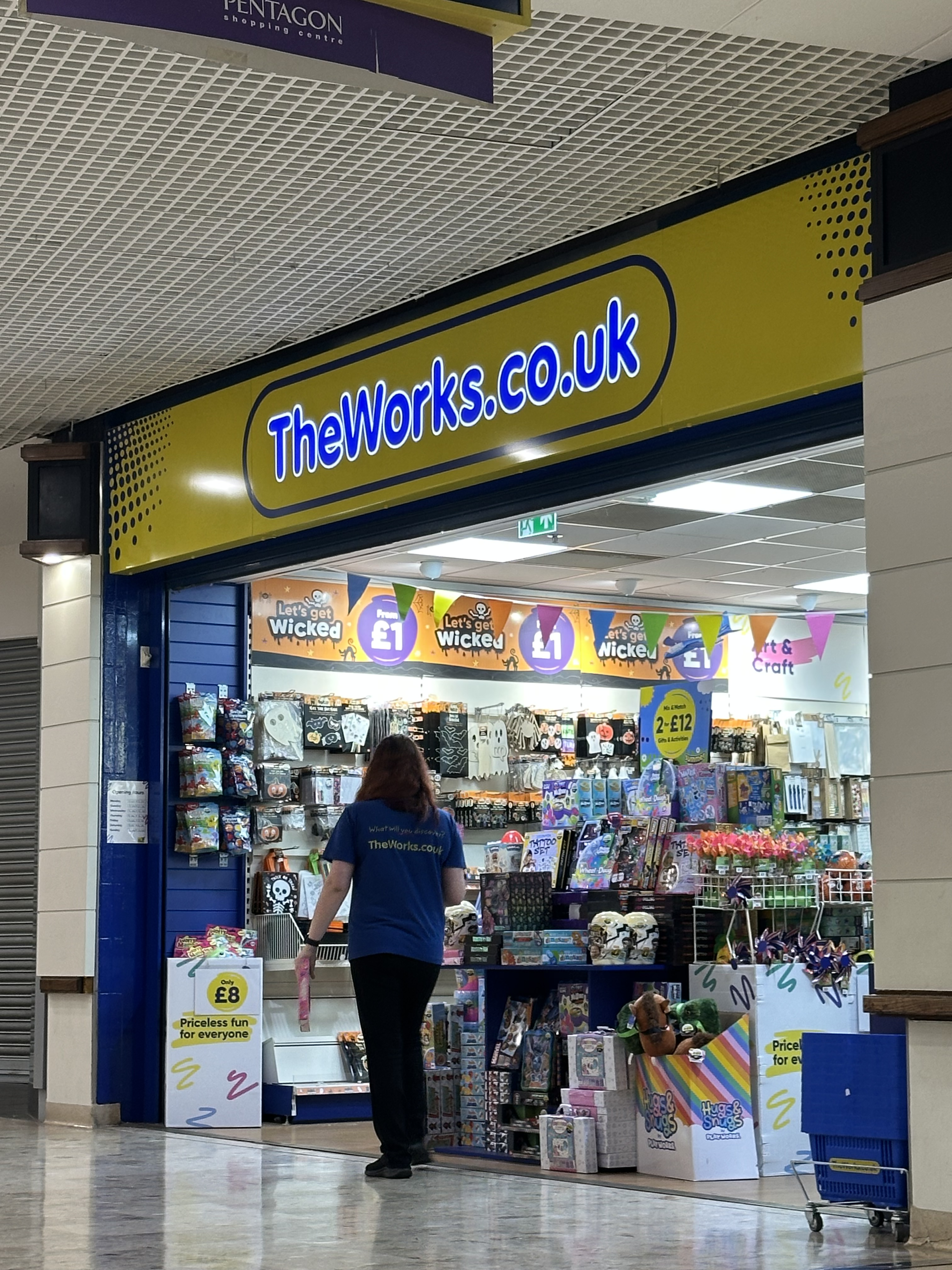
The Works in Pentagon Shopping Centre in Chatham (September 2025)

== Stores ==
The Works stores are categorised into five product "zones": Kids (toys, games etc.), Arts and Craft, Stationery, Family Gifts, and Seasonal/Regional, which includes a selection of local interest and tourist-specific ranges. TheWorks.co.uk, the company's first e-commerce platform, was launched in January 2012.

The company's loyalty card scheme, 'Together', was launched in 2013, and had reached one million members by the end of 2016. The scheme closed down in March 2024.

== History ==
=== Establishment ===
The Works has its origins when husband and wife Mike and Jane Crossley started selling remaindered books from their front room in 1981. The company was founded in 1981 as discount bookstore Remainders Limited. The Crossleys had both worked for British Leyland in Oxford whilst Mike Crossley's brother had been winding down a business in the West Midlands.

=== Growth ===
By 1984 the Crossleys had opened their first shop in Halesowen though this no longer features as a branch in the company's chain of stores. Over the next 16 years they expanded the business to open over 160 shops in the UK and Ireland, operating as Remainders Ltd. from a purpose-built base on an industrial park at Minworth opened in 1999 and achieving a turnover of £60m through a workforce of 1,200. In 2001, the Crossleys acquired 19 stores in the West Midlands, North West and Wales from failed retailer First Stop Stationery in a £1m deal. Like their high street stores these were re-badged as The Works as opposed to their range of factory shop outlets then called Book Depot.

In 2001, Remainders Ltd.'s success won the Crossleys the Birmingham Post's Business of the Month for May and, in November, Business of the Year award, which they received from the Duke of Kent at the International Convention Centre, Birmingham.

=== New management team ===
The Crossley's sold Remainders Ltd. to a management buyout in 2003 for around £25m. At this point the chain had grown to 176 stores with 1,500 staff, an annual turnover of £70m and reported profits in excess of £4m. The new management team was backed by Primary Capital and led by new Chairman Terry Norris. Norris had built up the Rhino Video Games retail business which he sold to Electronics Boutiques after it built up losses.

The new management regime continued to expand the business but began to struggle financially. Another Management buyout followed in 2005 when Hermes Private Equity Partners took a 79% interest. Problems persisted and plans for further expansion were abandoned in 2007. Accounts filed in 2006 showed losses totalling £54m. The Works acquired 26 outlets of the Bargain Books and Bookworld chains in 2007 after their parent company went into administration.

=== Administration and change of ownership ===
The Works itself entered administration in January 2008. The Works was placed into administration with liabilities of over £79.5m against assets of £6.6m. The administrators, Kroll, closed 85 loss-making stores from a total of 317 and cut over 25% of the 1,600 strong workforce.

The business was subsequently purchased by the private equity firm Endless in May 2008. The Works was rescued from administration in June 2008 by Anthony Solomon and private equity firm Endless, based in Leeds for £15m. At this point the chain had contracted to 226 stores with a turnover of £100m. Solomon brought in a new MD, Bob Lister, who had worked with him previously at The Factory Shop Group. Under the new team, the business began to recover and expand once more, with some stores re-opening and other new shops on fresh sites. Total sales for 2008/9 reached £88.8m and by July 2010 the number of outlets had climbed back to 260. The owners then declared their intention to sell the chain in early 2011 for £80m.

Hoyle became chairman of the discount retailer after a "sizeable cash investment" in July 2015.

It was announced in July 2018 that The Works, approximately one-third owned by Hoyle, would have an initial public offering and a valuation of £100 million. Hoyle retained the largest shareholding of 15% after the flotation.

== Lost shops ==
Many shops were closed after The Works went into administration in early 2008. Others have closed on the expiry of leases or when other premises became available. Shops which have closed include:

- Bolton: Unit 7B, The Linkway
- London
  - Camden Town: 197 Camden High Street (now American Apparel)
  - Covent Garden: Unit 10, The Piazza (as Banana Bookshop)
  - Oxford Street: 16 Oxford Street

== See also ==
- Books in the United Kingdom
