= Dean Hoyle =

English footballer (born 1967)

- Born: 16 April 1967 (age 59); Heckmondwike, West Riding of Yorkshire, England
- Occupation: Businessman
- Known for: Card Factory (Founder); Huddersfield Town A.F.C. (Chairman); The Works (Chairman & Largest Shareholder)
- Spouse: Janet Hoyle
- Children: 2

Dean Hoyle (born 16 April 1967) is the founder and former owner of Card Factory and the chairman of League One side Huddersfield Town. In 2015, Hoyle became chairman and majority shareholder of British discount retailer, The Works.

According to the Sunday Times Rich List in 2020, Hoyle is worth an estimated £284 million, an increase of £1 million from the previous year.

== Early life ==
Hoyle studied engineering at Dewsbury and Batley Technical and Art College after attending White Lee Secondary School in Heckmondwike.

== Card Factory ==
Hoyle and his wife, Janet, founded Card Factory, a chain of greetings cards and gift stores, in 1997. By 2009, the company had 500+ shops, employing over 50,000 people.

Hoyle confirmed on 9 April 2010 that the sale of the Card Factory to Venture Capitalist Charterhouse was completed the previous day. The terms of the deal were not disclosed, but financial commentators put the final selling price at in excess of £350 million. Hoyle announced that he would maintain a role in the business as Non-Executive Chairman.

== The Works ==
Hoyle became chairman of discount retailer The Works after a "sizeable cash investment" in 2015. In July 2018, it was announced that The Works, approximately a third owned by Hoyle, would have an IPO and a valuation of £100 million. Hoyle retained the largest shareholding of 15% after the flotation.

== Huddersfield Town ==
Hoyle is a lifelong Huddersfield Town A.F.C. supporter. He joined the board of Huddersfield Town on 10 April 2008 and took over as chairman, and majority shareholder, of the Club on 3 June 2009. The outgoing chairman, Ken Davy, retains a minority holding.

In November 2016, Hoyle was awarded the fcbusiness Championship CEO of the Year award at the Football Business Awards 2016.

In 2019, Hoyle decided to sell the club to lifelong fan Phil Hodgkinson. Huddersfield Town drew 1-1 with Manchester United on his final home game as the owner.

In late 2021 the now former Huddersfield Town owner, Phil Hodgkinson, saw multiple of his businesses collapse.

Due to this, in 2022, Dean Hoyle was reinstated as the Chairman of Huddersfield Town A.F.C

== Personal life ==
Hoyle is married to Janet, and they have two sons, Danny and Josh.
