= Celebrations Group =

Celebrations Group Ltd
- Company type: Private (Ltd)
- Industry: Retail
- Founded: 2006
- Defunct: 2009
- Fate: Administration
- Headquarters: Orton Southgate, Peterborough, PE2 6YG
- Key people: Milton Guffogg (CEO)
- Products: Greeting Cards; Calendars
- Number of employees: 1,800

Celebrations Group was a chain of British greeting cards stores. Most of their stores traded under the names of Cardfair and Card Warehouse. Celebrations Group was formed in 2006, when it purchased part of the Greeting Card Group from administrators PricewaterhouseCoopers.

== The company ==
The company had 288 stores across the United Kingdom and employed around 1800 staff. It had a head office and distribution centre at Orton Southgate in Peterborough. Celebrations Group also fully owned the transactional website Calendar Factory. The company was formed in July 2006 following the dissolution of the Greeting Card Group Ltd which was itself an amalgamation of the Card Fair and Card Warehouse brands which had existed since the early 1990s as separate companies. Both brands were maintained following the acquisition of Card Warehouse by Card Fair in May 2003, with some towns having two stores on the same high street. This remained the case for a short time after Celebrations Group acquired the Greeting Card Group's stores, staff and assets, with a large number of dual site stores later closed. Celebrations was founded as 'Callfort Services Ltd' until the appointment of CEO Milton Guffogg on 11 January 2007. Guffogg initiated a naming competition with staff from all disciplines permitted to put forward their suggestions. After a short deliberation, 'Celebrations' was selected as the winning name as it was thought the word embodied the company ethic and image.

CEO Milton Guffogg invested large amounts of money into the new organisation, including an investment in customer service training, new uniform (lilac polo shirts) and a high-end EPOS system to replace the old analogue cash registers that had been in use since the 1990s. The new system also permitted online stock replenishment. Additional money was spent appointing external consultants to assist shop staff in customer service, merchandising and upselling. He was a popular CEO and made an effort to know his staff on a personal level, even forgoing the convention of the average CEO by wearing the lilac polo shirt he had introduced instead of a suit and tie. In an attempt to change the culture of the organisation, the focus was shifted from total daily takings to average transaction value (ATV) as a measure of a store's success. The individual performance of staff members was measured by this number, principally in terms of its reflection of a staff member's success in upselling. This shift in culture was largely well-received yet was difficult for the more parochially minded staff who were not comfortable pushing sales onto customers.

== Administration ==
On 8 October 2008 Kroll Corporate Advisory & Restructuring Group (now known as Zolfo Cooper Europe) were appointed administrators of the company. The company entered administration due to cash flow difficulties.

== Card Factory ==
On 28 November 2008 it was announced that Card Factory had purchased 76 of the group's 288 stores as part of a rescue package, securing around 500 of the 1800 jobs. In 2007, Card Factory, a greeting card retailer based in Wakefield, began a rapid expansion of its stores throughout the UK. The company, established in 1997 and maintaining a consistently similar brand identity, colour scheme, and stock, strategically opened stores in prominent locations nationwide, predominantly near or adjacent to Celebrations stores. This proximity led some customers to confuse Card Factory as a sister company or affiliated brand, despite offering similar, if not the same products at the same or significantly lower prices. This, coupled with the desirable high street locations, made the new Card Factory stores highly appealing, resulting in a shift in customer preference. Subsequently, Celebrations stores experienced a decline in sales, with some locations reporting a decrease exceeding two-thirds.

== Closure ==
The remaining 212 stores that were not purchased by Card Factory stopped trading on 11 January 2009, with only managers and assistant managers in on 12 January 2009 to deal with official store closures. Celebrations’ transactional website Calendar Factory stopped trading just before the New Year, after it had run out of stock.

== Reasons for Company Failure ==
According to Companies House, Zolfo Cooper Ltd, a restructuring and advisory company, held a meeting of the creditors on 27 February 2009 and came to the following conclusions:

1. That, following the acquisition of the Greeting Card Group's assets in January 2007, a drive to improve revenue by way of store closures, new openings and refits of existing stores did not secure anticipated cost savings and the company's activities instead relied on top line growth.
2. The company did not have an integrated merchandising system or integrated financial model and there was a lack of continuity in the senior roles within the finance system.
3. The company's drive to increase average transaction value (ATV) by selling ancillary products such as stamps and confectionary did not generate the uplift in sales required and did not increase footfall.
4. The Management Team was too large and costly for an organisation of its size and assets.
