= Opportunity =

Opportunity may refer to:

== Places ==
- Opportunity, Montana, an unincorporated community, United States
- Opportunity, Nebraska, an unincorporated community, United States
- Opportunity, Washington, a former census-designated place, United States
- 39382 Opportunity, an asteroid

== Arts, entertainment, and media ==
=== Music ===
- "Opportunity" (Pete Murray song), 2006
- "Opportunity", a song by The Charlatans
- "Opportunity", a song from Annie
- "Opportunities (Let's Make Lots of Money)", a song by Pet Shop Boys
- "Oppurtunities", by Jesper Kyd from the 2018 Indian film Tumbbad

=== Other uses in arts, entertainment, and media ===
- Opportunity (film), a 1918 film
- Opportunity: A Journal of Negro Life, a literary periodical of the Harlem Renaissance
- The Opportunity, a 17th-century play

== Finance ==
- Opportunity International, a microfinance network that lends to the working poor
- Opportunity NYC, a 2007–2012 experimental conditional cash transfer program in New York City

== Other uses ==
- Opportunity (rover), a robotic rover on Mars
- Opportunity Party (New Zealand), a political party in New Zealand
- Business opportunity
- Equal opportunity
- Market opportunity
- Means, motive, and opportunity, a popular cultural summation of the three aspects of a crime needed to convince a jury of guilt
- Political opportunity
- Window of opportunity

== See also ==
- Crisis
- Danger (disambiguation)
- Launch window
- Opportunism
- Opportunity cost
