= 2022 EFL Championship play-off final =

Association football match in London

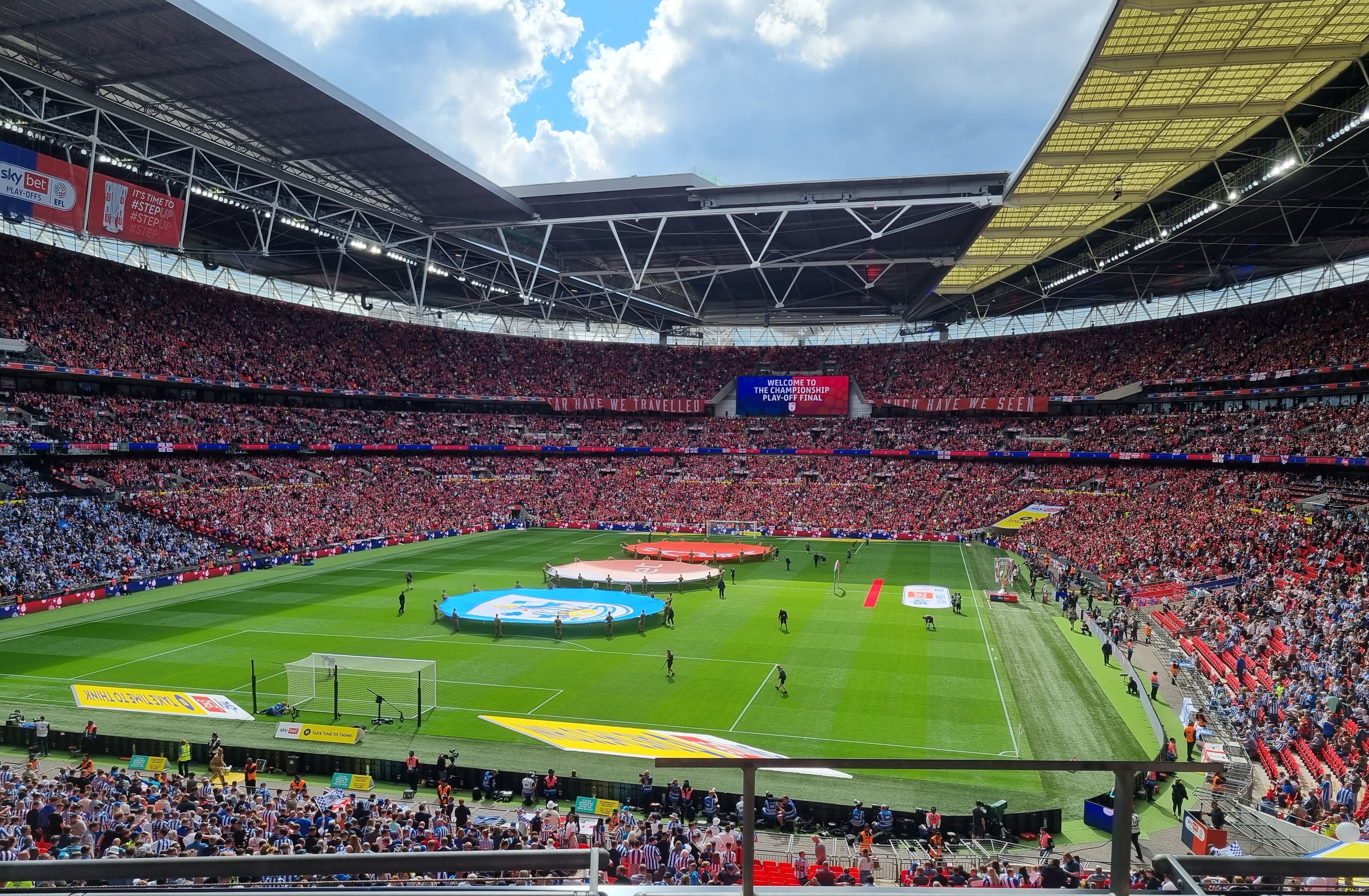
- Wembley Stadium in London hosted the final.
Huddersfield Town	Nottingham Forest
0	1
- Date: 29 May 2022
- Venue: Wembley Stadium, London
- Man of the Match: Scott McKenna (Nottingham Forest)
- Referee: Jon Moss
- Attendance: 80,019

The 2022 EFL Championship play-off final was an association football match which was played on 29 May 2022 at Wembley Stadium, London, England, to determine the third and final team to gain promotion from the EFL Championship, the second tier of English football, to the Premier League. The top two teams of the 2021–22 EFL Championship, Fulham and Bournemouth, gained automatic promotion to the Premier League, while the clubs placed from third to sixth in the table took part in the 2022 English Football League play-offs. Huddersfield Town and Nottingham Forest competed for the final place in the 2022–23 Premier League season.

Jonathan Moss was the referee for the match, which was played in front of 80,019 spectators. Nottingham Forest took the lead in the 43rd minute when Huddersfield's Levi Colwill scored an own goal attempting to defend a cross from James Garner. Despite Huddersfield's claims for two penalty kicks, neither were awarded and Huddersfield ended with no shots on target. Nottingham Forest won the match 1–0 to gain promotion back to the Premier League for the first time in 23 years.

== Route to the final ==
EFL Championship final table, leading positions
Pos	Team	Pld	W	D	L	GF	GA	GD	Pts
1	Fulham (C, P)	46	27	9	10	106	43	+63	90
2	Bournemouth (P)	46	25	13	8	74	39	+35	88
3	Huddersfield Town	46	23	13	10	64	47	+17	82
4	Nottingham Forest (O, P)	46	23	11	12	73	40	+33	80
5	Sheffield United	46	21	12	13	63	45	+18	75
6	Luton Town	46	21	12	13	63	55	+8	75

(C) Champions; (O) Play-off winners; (P) Promoted

Huddersfield Town finished the regular 2021–22 season in third place in the EFL Championship, the second tier of the English football league system, one place and two points ahead of Nottingham Forest. They both therefore missed out on the two automatic places for promotion to the Premier League and instead took part in the play-offs to determine the third and final promoted team. Huddersfield finished six points behind Bournemouth (who were promoted in second place) and eight behind league winners Fulham.

In their play-off semi-final, Huddersfield faced sixth-placed Luton Town with the first match of the two-legged tie taking place at Kenilworth Road in Luton on 13 May 2022. In the 12th minute, Harry Toffolo passed the ball forward for Danel Sinani who struck the ball past Matt Ingram in the Luton Town goal to give Huddersfield the lead. Eighteen minutes later, Sonny Bradley scored from Kal Naismith's free kick to level the score. Although Huddersfield controlled the second half, neither side were able to add to their score and the match ended 1–1. The return leg was held three days later at the John Smith's Stadium in Huddersfield. Luton Town dominated the first half but failed to capitalise and with eight minutes to go in the second half, Jordan Rhodes scored from close range from a Sorba Thomas free kick, to secure a 1–0 victory for Huddersfield. The victory secured progression to the final with a 2–1 win on aggregate.

In the other play-off semi-final, Nottingham Forest met Sheffield United and the first leg was held at Bramall Lane in Sheffield on 14 May 2022. The visiting side took an early lead when Jack Colback scored after Wes Foderingham had saved a shot from Philip Zinckernagel. Brennan Johnson then doubled his side's lead with 19 minutes of the match remaining after taking advantage of an error from John Egan. One minute into injury time, Sander Berge scored from a Morgan Gibbs-White corner to halve the deficit and the matched ended 2–1 to Nottingham Forest. The second leg was played three days later at the City Ground in Nottingham. In the 19th minute, Johnson scored for Nottingham Forest to give them a 3–1 aggregate lead but Gibbs-White and John Fleck scored second-half goals for Sheffield United to force the match into extra time. With no change to the scoreline in the extra 30 minutes, the game went to a penalty shoot-out. Brice Samba, the Nottingham Forest goalkeeper, who had needed to make several saves during regular and extra time, denied three of the Sheffield United penalty-takers and Nottingham Forest won the shoot-out 3–2 to qualify for the final. During a pitch invasion after the match, Sheffield United's Billy Sharp was headbutted to the ground and required stitches to a wound; the perpetrator was later jailed.

== Match ==
=== Background ===
This was Huddersfield Town's sixth appearance in a play-off final. Their most recent previous appearance was in the 2017 EFL Championship play-off final where they drew 0–0 with Reading before going on to win 4–3 in the resulting penalty shoot-out to secure promotion to the Premier League. That match was also Huddersfield's most recent appearance at Wembley Stadium. They were relegated two seasons later and had played in the second tier of English football since the 2019–20 season. It was Nottingham Forest's first play-off final, having been knocked out in the semi-finals three times in the 2000s. They had played in the Championship for fourteen consecutive seasons after securing promotion from League One in the 2007–08 season. Nottingham Forest made their most recent appearance at the national stadium when they lost 1–0 to Manchester United in the 1992 Football League Cup Final at the original Wembley. They had last played at the top tier of English football in the 1998–99 season. The final was Nottingham Forest's first appearance at the new Wembley since the stadium was re-opened in 2007.

Nottingham Forest and Huddersfield had faced each other three times during the season, with both sides winning away in the league. Nottingham Forest won 2–0 in September 2021 while Huddersfield secured a 1–0 victory three months later. In March 2022, the teams played each other in the fifth round of the 2021–22 FA Cup, with Nottingham Forest coming from behind to win 2–1. Going into the final, Johnson was top scorer for Nottingham Forest with 18 goals and 10 assists in 48 appearances, while Danny Ward was leading marksman for Huddersfield, having scored 14 times and making 3 assists in 42 games.

In May 2022, the EFL announced that for the first time, the video assistant referee (VAR) system would be used at all play-off finals. The referee for the final was Jon Moss, who was officiating his final match before retirement despite his close relationship with the father of the Forest manager, and was assisted by Marc Perry and Tim Wood. Craig Pawson was the fourth official while Paul Tierney acted as the VAR.

=== Summary ===
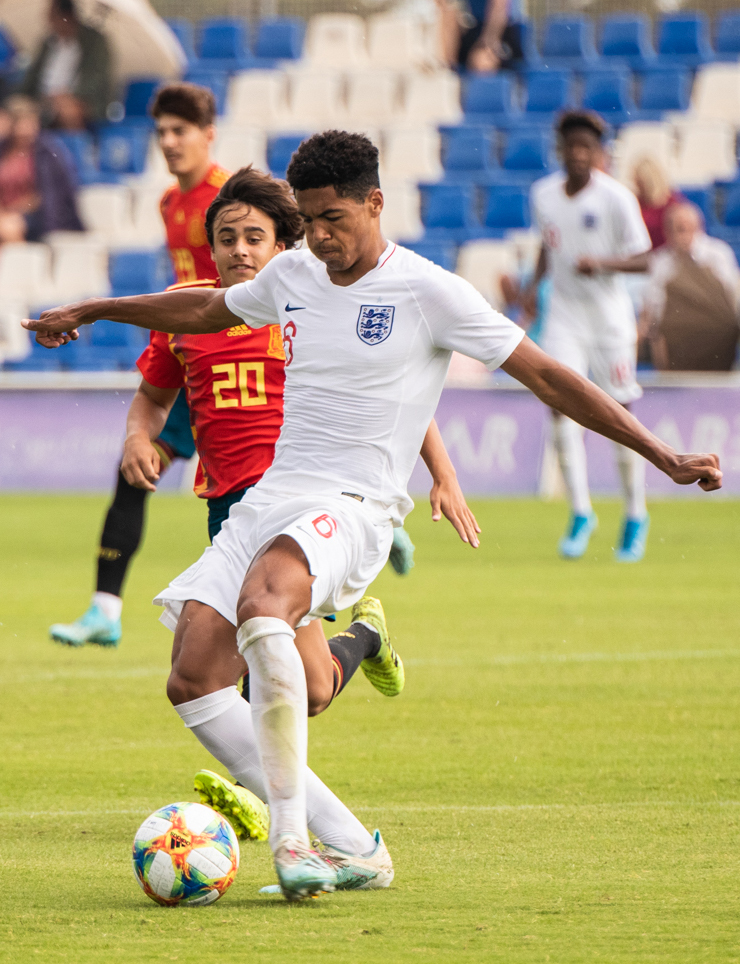
Levi Colwill (pictured in 2019) scored the only goal of the game, into his own net off his knee.

Nottingham Forest kicked off the match at around 4.30 p.m. on 29 May 2022 in front of 80,019 supporters at Wembley Stadium, London. Two early fouls from Joe Worrall both resulted in free kicks for Huddersfield, neither of which threatened the Nottingham Forest goal. In the 12th minute, Zinckernagel was brought down by Naby Sarr but Ryan Yates headed James Garner's free kick wide of the Huddersfield Town goal. Nottingham Forest increased the pressure and Sarr had to clear the ball to prevent Keinan Davis from shooting. In the 23rd minute, Yates struck the ball from the edge of the Huddersfield Town penalty area but it went high over the crossbar. Seven minutes later, Scott McKenna's shot was cleared by Huddersfield Town. Zinckernagel's curving strike was then blocked before Thomas's dribble ended with a poor delivery; the former footballer Matthew Glennon suggested that he thought Thomas had "got caught between shooting and crossing."

The deadlock was broken in the 43rd minute with Nottingham Forest taking the lead. Davis passed the ball to Garner who crossed it into the Huddersfield Town penalty area from the left towards Yates but it ricocheted off Levi Colwill's knee and went high into the left corner of the net for an own goal. After one minute of stoppage time, the first half came to an end with the score 1–0 to Nottingham Forest.

Neither side made any changes to their playing personnel during the interval and Huddersfield Town kicked the second half off. Three minutes in, Yates struck the ball from around 25 yards (23 m) but it was saved by Lee Nicholls in the Huddersfield goal. In the 55th minute, Zinckernagel received the first yellow card of the match for a foul on Lewis O'Brien but the resulting free kick went wide of the Nottingham Forest goal. Two minutes later, Jonathan Hogg's header was high before Huddersfield Town made the first substitution of the game with Jon Russell replacing Sarr. In the 66th minute, Nottingham Forest made their first personnel change, with Sam Surridge coming on for Davis, while Huddersfield Town made a double-substitution a minute later, when Sinani was replaced by Duane Holmes and Rhodes came on for Ward. On 71 minutes, a shot from Johnson went wide of the Huddersfield Town goal before Toffolo fell in the Nottingham Forest penalty area after a tackle from Colback, which the referee judged to be a dive. The decision was reviewed by VAR, which did not find a "clear and obvious error", and Toffolo was booked for a dive, and no penalty was awarded.

With fifteen minutes remaining, Zinckernagel was substituted and replaced by Max Lowe for Nottingham Forest. In the 84th minute, Huddersfield Town's O'Brien was brought down by Lowe and despite claims for a penalty, the referee declined to award it. Three minutes later, Pipa's 35-yard (32 m) strike went high over the Nottingham Forest goal before Samba was forced off the pitch with an injury to be replaced by Ethan Horvath. Six minutes of stoppage time were indicated by the fourth official, and with one minute remaining, O'Brien's shot from the edge of the Nottingham Forest penalty area flew wide. The referee blew the final whistle and Nottingham Forest won the match 1–0, to gain promotion to the Premier League.

=== Details ===
29 May 2022
16:30 BST

Huddersfield Town	0–1	Nottingham Forest
	Report	Colwill 43' (o.g.)

Wembley Stadium, London
Attendance: 80,019
Referee: Jon Moss

Huddersfield Town	Nottingham Forest

GK	21	(England) Lee Nicholls
CB	32	(England) Tom Lees
CB	23	(Senegal) Naby Sarr		(substituted off) 57'
CB	26	(England) Levi Colwill
RM	2	(Spain) Pipa
CM	6	(England) Jonathan Hogg (c)
CM	8	(England) Lewis O'Brien
LM	3	(England) Harry Toffolo	(yellow card) 73'
RW	24	(Luxembourg) Danel Sinani		(substituted off) 66'
CF	25	(England) Danny Ward		(substituted off) 67'
LW	16	(Wales) Sorba Thomas
Substitutes:
GK	18	(England) Jamal Blackman
DF	4	(England) Matty Pearson
DF	20	(England) Ollie Turton
MF	7	(England) Tino Anjorin
MF	19	(United States) Duane Holmes		(substituted on) 66'
MF	37	(England) Jon Russell		(substituted on) 57'
FW	9	(Scotland) Jordan Rhodes		(substituted on) 67'
Head Coach:
(Spain) Carlos Corberán

GK	30	(Republic of the Congo) Brice Samba		(substituted off) 90'
CB	4	(England) Joe Worrall (c)
CB	27	(England) Steve Cook
CB	26	(Scotland) Scott McKenna
RM	2	(England) Djed Spence
CM	22	(England) Ryan Yates
CM	37	(England) James Garner
LM	8	(England) Jack Colback
AM	11	(Denmark) Philip Zinckernagel	(yellow card) 55'	(substituted off) 74'
CF	20	(Wales) Brennan Johnson
CF	9	(England) Keinan Davis		(substituted off) 66'
Substitutes:
GK	1	(United States) Ethan Horvath		(substituted on) 90'
DF	3	(Portugal) Tobias Figueiredo
DF	15	(England) Max Lowe		(substituted on) 74'
MF	18	(Portugal) Cafú
MF	23	(England) Joe Lolley
FW	16	(England) Sam Surridge		(substituted on) 66'
FW	17	(England) Alex Mighten
Head Coach:
(Wales) Steve Cooper

Man of the Match:
Scott McKenna (Nottingham Forest)

Statistics
	Huddersfield Town	Nottingham Forest
Possession	48%	52%
Goals scored	0	1
Shots on target	0	2
Shots off target	5	6
Fouls committed	7	11
Corner kicks	4	2
Yellow cards	1	1
Red cards	0	0

== Post-match ==
Huddersfield Town manager Carlos Corberán questioned the utility of VAR, stating he had "No idea what the point of VAR is ... I don't know if they can review actions, if the referee doesn't ask? ... I can only accept the decisions." His defender, Tom Lees, was also convinced that decisions had gone against his side, suggesting that it "could change the club forever, I thought we had the cameras there to make sure the game wasn't spoiled by a bad decision. We've just got to take it." Meanwhile, Nottingham Forest manager Steve Cooper stated, "We deserve to be promoted, there is no doubt about that."
