= 2017–18 Huddersfield Town A.F.C. season =

Huddersfield Town
2017–18 season
- Chairman: Dean Hoyle
- Head Coach: David Wagner
- Stadium: John Smith's Stadium
- Premier League: 16th
- FA Cup: Fifth round (eliminated by Manchester United)
- EFL Cup: Third round (eliminated by Crystal Palace)
- Top goalscorer: League: Steve Mounié (7); All: Steve Mounié (9)
- Highest home attendance: 24,169 vs West Bromwich Albion (4 November 2017)
- Lowest home attendance: 8,290 vs Rotherham United (23 August 2017)
- Average home league attendance: 24,035
- Biggest win: 3–0 vs Crystal Palace (12 August 2017); 4–1 vs Watford (16 December 2017); 4–1 vs AFC Bournemouth (11 February 2018)
- Biggest defeat: 0–5 vs Arsenal (29 November 2017)
Home colours	Away colours	Third colours

The 2017–18 season was Huddersfield Town's 109th year in existence and first season in the Premier League following promotion through the 2017 Championship play-off final. The club also competed in the FA Cup and EFL Cup.

The season covered the period from 1 July 2017 to 30 June 2018.

== Transfers ==
=== Transfers in ===
Date from	Position	Nationality	Name	From	Fee	Ref.
1 July 2017	CF	(Belgium)	Laurent Depoitre	Porto	undisclosed	
1 July 2017	CM	(Australia)	Aaron Mooy	Manchester City	£20,000,000	
4 July 2017	LM	(England)	Tom Ince	Derby County	Undisc.	
4 July 2017	CM	(United States)	Danny Williams	Reading	Free	
5 July 2017	CF	(Benin)	Steve Mounié	Montpellier	£18,500,000	
5 July 2017	LB	(England)	Scott Malone	Fulham	Undisc.	
7 July 2017	CB	(Denmark)	Mathias Jørgensen	Copenhagen	£23,500,000	
23 August 2017	AM	(Morocco)	Abdelhamid Sabiri	1. FC Nürnberg	Undisc.	
27 August 2017	GK	(England)	Robert Green	Leeds United	Free	
12 January 2018	AM	(England)	Alex Pritchard	Norwich City	Undisc.	

=== Loans in ===
Start date	Position	Nationality	Name	From	End date	Ref.
1 July 2017	GK	(Denmark)	Jonas Lössl	Mainz 05	30 June 2018	
4 July 2017	AM	(England)	Kasey Palmer	Chelsea	3 January 2018	
24 August 2017	RB	(Switzerland)	Florent Hadergjonaj	FC Ingolstadt	30 June 2018	
2 January 2018	CB	(Netherlands)	Terence Kongolo	Monaco	30 June 2018	

=== Transfers out ===
Date from	Position	Nationality	Name	To	Fee	Ref.
1 July 2017	CF	(Albania)	Flo Bojaj	Welling United	Released	(Note: Flo Bojaj joined Welling United following his release.)
1 July 2017	CF	(Republic of Ireland)	Ronan Coughlan	Bray Wanderers	Released	(Note: Ronan Coughlan joined Bray Wanderers following his release.)
1 July 2017	CM	(England)	Kyle Dempsey	Fleetwood Town	£725,000	
1 July 2017	CF	(England)	Frank Mulhern	Guiseley	Released	(Note: Frank Mulhern joined Guiseley following his release.)
1 July 2017	GK	(Republic of Ireland)	Joe Murphy	Bury	Free	
1 July 2017	CM	(England)	Jamie Spencer	Bradford Park Avenue	Released	(Note: Jamie Spencer joined Bradford Park Avenue following his release.)
1 July 2017	CM	(Republic of Ireland)	Sam Warde	Colchester United	Released	(Note: Sam Warde joined Colchester United following his release.)
4 August 2017	LW	(England)	Harry Bunn	Bury	Undisclosed	
8 August 2017	CB	(England)	Mark Hudson	Retired	—N/a	
17 August 2017	GK	(England)	Luke Coddington	Northampton Town	Free	
28 August 2017	LB	(Australia)	Jason Davidson	Rijeka	Free	
31 August 2017	CF	(Bermuda)	Nahki Wells	Burnley	Undisclosed	
5 January 2018	CF	(England)	Deshane Dalling	Queens Park Rangers	Free	
12 January 2018	GK	(Republic of Ireland)	Tadhg Ryan	Galway United	Free	
24 January 2018	CB	(Republic of Ireland)	Danny Kane	Cork City	Free	
31 January 2018	CF	(England)	Cedwyn Scott	Dundee	Free	
31 January 2018	CB	(England)	Martin Cranie	Middlesbrough	Undisclosed	
31 January 2018	RW	(England)	Joe Lolley	Nottingham Forest	Undisclosed	

=== Loans out ===
Start date	Position	Nationality	Name	To	End date	Ref.
5 July 2017	LB	(England)	Tareiq Holmes-Dennis	Portsmouth	31 May 2018	
5 July 2017	CF	(England)	Jordy Hiwula	Fleetwood Town	31 May 2018	
6 July 2017	CB	(England)	Fraser Horsfall	Gateshead	31 August 2017 (Note: Fraser Horsfall was recalled and sent on loan to Kidderminster Harriers.)	
11 July 2017	CF	(England)	Rekeil Pyke	Port Vale	31 May 2018	
28 July 2017	AM	(England)	Jack Payne	Oxford United	5 May 2018	
18 August 2017	RW	(Republic of Ireland)	Sean Scannell	Burton Albion	6 January 2018	
25 August 2017	RB	(England)	Jordan Williams	Bury	31 May 2018	
31 August 2017	CB	(England)	Fraser Horsfall	Kidderminster Harriers	31 January 2018	
8 January 2018	GK	(England)	Ryan Schofield	Telford United	31 May 2018	-
31 January 2018	CB	(England)	Dylan Cogill	Clyde	31 May 2018	
31 January 2018	AM	(England)	Jack Boyle	Clyde	31 May 2018	

== First team ==
Last updated on 31 January 2018

Squad No.	Name	Nationality	Position(s)	Date of birth (age)
Goalkeepers
1	Jonas Lössl	(Denmark)	GK	1 February 1989 (age 37)
13	Joel Coleman	(England)	GK	26 September 1995 (age 31)
28	Robert Green	(England)	GK	18 January 1980 (aged 37)
31	Ryan Schofield	(England)	GK	11 December 1999 (age 26)
Defenders
2	Tommy Smith (captain)	(England)	RB	14 April 1992 (age 34)
3	Scott Malone	(England)	LB / LW	25 March 1991 (age 35)
5	Terence Kongolo	(Netherlands)	CB / LB	14 February 1994 (aged 24)
15	Chris Löwe	(Germany)	LB	16 April 1989 (age 37)
25	Mathias Jørgensen	(Denmark)	CB	23 April 1990 (age 36)
26	Christopher Schindler	(Germany)	CB	29 April 1990 (age 36)
27	Jon Gorenc Stanković	(Slovenia)	CB	14 January 1996 (age 30)
33	Florent Hadergjonaj	(Switzerland)	RB / RWB / DM	31 July 1994 (age 32)
44	Michael Hefele	(Germany)	CB	1 September 1990 (age 36)
Midfielders
4	Dean Whitehead	(England)	DM / CM	21 January 1982 (age 44)
6	Jonathan Hogg (vice-captain)	(England)	DM / CM	6 December 1988 (age 37)
7	Sean Scannell	(Republic of Ireland)	RW	17 September 1990 (age 36)
8	Philip Billing	(Denmark)	CM	11 June 1996 (age 30)
10	Aaron Mooy	(Australia)	CM / AM	15 September 1990 (age 36)
11	Abdelhamid Sabiri	(Morocco)	AM	28 November 1996 (age 29)
17	Rajiv van La Parra	(Netherlands)	LW / RW	4 June 1991 (age 35)
19	Danny Williams	(United States)	DM / CM / RB	8 March 1989 (age 37)
21	Alex Pritchard	(England)	AM	3 May 1993 (age 33)
22	Tom Ince	(England)	LW / RW / AM	30 January 1992 (age 34)
39	Lewis O’Brien	(England)	AM	14 October 1998 (age 28)
Forwards
9	Elias Kachunga	(Democratic Republic of the Congo)	ST / RW	22 April 1992 (age 34)
20	Laurent Depoitre	(Belgium)	ST	7 December 1988 (age 37)
23	Collin Quaner	(Germany)	ST / RW / LW	18 June 1991 (age 35)
24	Steve Mounié	(Benin)	ST	29 September 1994 (age 32)

== Squad statistics ==
=== Appearances and goals ===
As 18:20, 13 May 2018 (UTC)

No.	Pos	Nat	Player	Total		Premier League		FA Cup		EFL Cup	
No.	Pos	Nat	Player	Apps	Goals	Apps	Goals	Apps	Goals	Apps	Goals
1	GK	(Denmark) DEN	Jonas Lössl	40	0	38	0	2	0	0	0
2	DF	(England) ENG	Tommy Smith	27	0	21+3	0	2+1	0	0	0
3	DF	(England) ENG	Scott Malone	28	0	12+10	0	2+2	0	2	0
4	MF	(England) ENG	Dean Whitehead	7	0	0+4	0	0+1	0	1+1	0
5	DF	(Netherlands) NED	Terence Kongolo	17	0	11+2	0	4	0	0	0
6	MF	(England) ENG	Jonathan Hogg	33	0	29+1	0	2	0	1	0
7	MF	(Republic of Ireland) IRL	Sean Scannell	1	0	0	0	0+1	0	0	0
8	MF	(Denmark) DEN	Philip Billing	22	1	8+8	0	2+2	0	1+1	1
9	FW	(Democratic Republic of the Congo) COD	Elias Kachunga	21	1	17+2	1	0	0	1+1	0
10	MF	(Australia) AUS	Aaron Mooy	38	4	34+2	4	1	0	0+1	0
11	MF	(Morocco) MAR	Abdelhamid Sabiri	10	0	2+3	0	3+1	0	0+1	0
13	GK	(England) ENG	Joel Coleman	4	0	0	0	2	0	2	0
15	DF	(Germany) GER	Chris Löwe	25	0	19+4	0	1+1	0	0	0
17	MF	(Netherlands) NED	Rajiv van La Parra	38	5	26+7	3	2+2	2	1	0
19	MF	(United States) USA	Danny Williams	24	1	11+9	0	3	1	1	0
20	FW	(Belgium) BEL	Laurent Depoitre	35	6	18+15	6	1	0	1	0
21	MF	(England) ENG	Alex Pritchard	14	1	12+2	1	0	0	0	0
22	MF	(England) ENG	Tom Ince	37	3	27+6	2	2	1	1+1	0
23	FW	(Germany) GER	Collin Quaner	31	0	13+13	0	4	0	1	0
24	FW	(Benin) BEN	Steve Mounié	31	9	21+7	7	3	2	0	0
25	DF	(Denmark) DEN	Mathias Jørgensen	40	0	38	0	2	0	0	0
26	DF	(Germany) GER	Christopher Schindler	39	0	37	0	1	0	1	0
33	DF	(Switzerland) SUI	Florent Hadergjonaj	27	0	19+4	0	2+1	0	1	0
36	DF	(England) ENG	Jordan Williams	1	0	0	0	0	0	1	0
44	DF	(Germany) GER	Michael Hefele	6	0	0+2	0	2	0	2	0
Players who left during the season
14	DF	(England) ENG	Martin Cranie	4	0	2+1	0	0	0	1	0
18	MF	(England) ENG	Joe Lolley	10	2	2+4	1	1+1	0	2	1
45	MF	(England) ENG	Kasey Palmer	5	0	1+3	0	0	0	1	0

=== Cards ===
As of 9 May 2018

Number	Nation	Position	Name	Premier League		FA Cup		League Cup		Total	
Number	Nation	Position	Name	Yellow card	Red card	Yellow card	Red card	Yellow card	Red card	Yellow card	Red card
6	(England)	MF	Jonathan Hogg	8	1	0	0	0	0	8	1
2	(England)	DF	Tommy Smith	7	0	0	0	0	0	7	0
26	(Germany)	DF	Christopher Schindler	6	1	0	0	0	0	6	1
25	(Denmark)	DF	Mathias Jørgensen	5	0	0	0	0	0	5	0
10	(Australia)	MF	Aaron Mooy	5	0	0	0	0	0	5	0
23	(Germany)	FW	Collin Quaner	4	0	0	0	0	0	4	0
17	(Netherlands)	MF	Rajiv van La Parra	3	1	0	0	0	0	3	1
3	(England)	DF	Scott Malone	3	0	0	0	0	0	3	0
8	(Denmark)	MF	Philip Billing	3	0	0	0	0	0	3	0
33	(Switzerland)	DF	Florent Hadergjonaj	3	0	0	0	0	0	3	0
44	(Germany)	DF	Michael Hefele	1	0	1	0	1	0	3	0
45	(England)	MF	Kasey Palmer	2	0	0	0	0	0	2	0
24	(Benin)	FW	Steve Mounié	2	0	0	0	0	0	2	0
19	(United States)	MF	Danny Williams	2	0	0	0	0	0	2	0
11	(Morocco)	MF	Abdelhamid Sabiri	1	0	0	0	0	0	1	0
21	(England)	MF	Alex Pritchard	1	0	0	0	0	0	1	0
1	(Denmark)	GK	Jonas Lössl	1	0	0	0	0	0	1	0
9	(Democratic Republic of the Congo)	FW	Elias Kachunga	1	0	0	0	0	0	1	0
20	(Belgium)	FW	Laurent Depoitre	1	0	0	0	0	0	1	0
18	(England)	MF	Joe Lolley	1	0	0	0	0	0	1	0
13	(England)	GK	Joel Coleman	0	0	1	0	0	0	1	0
			Totals	58	3	2	0	1	0	61	3

== Awards ==
=== Huddersfield Town Blue & White Foundation Player of the Month Award ===
Awarded monthly to the player that was chosen by members of the Blue & White Foundation voting on htafc.com

Month	Player	Votes
August	(Germany) Christopher Schindler	
September	(Germany) Christopher Schindler	
October	(Belgium) Laurent Depoitre	
November	(Germany) Christopher Schindler	
December	(Denmark) Jonas Lössl	
January	(England) Jonathan Hogg	
February	(Benin) Steve Mounié	
March	(England) Jonathan Hogg	
Season	(Germany) Christopher Schindler	

== Pre-season ==
=== Friendlies ===
As of 14 July 2017, Huddersfield Town have announced six pre-season friendlies against Bury, Accrington Stanley, Barnsley, VfB Stuttgart, Torino, SV Sandhausen and Udinese.

12 July 2017	Accrington Stanley	0–1	Huddersfield Town	Accrington
19:00 BST		Report	Ince 55'	Stadium: Crown Ground

16 July 2017	Bury	1–3	Huddersfield Town	Bury
15:00 BST	Beckford 48'	Report	Mounié 53'; Ince 63'; Kachunga 87' (pen.)	Stadium: Gigg Lane; Attendance: 3,306

18 July 2017	SV Sandhausen	3–2	Huddersfield Town	Sandhausen, Germany
18:00 CEST	Vollmann 25'; Daghfous 54'; Höler 70' (pen.)	Report	Ince 63'; Mounié 78'	Stadium: BWT-Stadion am Hardtwald

22 July 2017	Huddersfield Town	1–0	Girona	Huddersfield
12:00 BST	Palmer 34'	Report		Stadium: PPG Canalside

22 July 2017	Barnsley	0–1	Huddersfield Town	Barnsley
16:00 BST		Report	Mounié 89'	Stadium: Oakwell

26 July 2017	Huddersfield Town	1–2	Udinese	Huddersfield
18:00 BST	Ince 13'	Report	Lasagna 34'; Matos 74'	Stadium: John Smith's Stadium; Attendance: 6,443; Referee: Anthony Taylor

1 August 2017	VfB Stuttgart	3–3	Huddersfield Town	Schwaz, Austria
18:00 CEST	Terodde 12'; Akolo 41'; Werner 67'	Report	Van La Parra 54'; Quaner 77'; Scannell 80'	Stadium: Sportzentrum Schwaz

4 August 2017	Torino	2–2	Huddersfield Town	Jenbach, Austria
16:00 CEST	Edera 22'; Obi 53'	Report	Kachunga 35'; Mounié 56'	Stadium: Stadion Jenbach; Attendance: 575

3 September 2017	Altona 93	0–3	Huddersfield Town	Altona, Germany
16:00 BST		Report	Depoitre 4', 81'; Sabiri 58'	Stadium: Adolf-Jäger-Kampfbahn

== Competitions ==
=== Overview ===
Competition	First match	Last match	Starting round	Final position	Record							
Competition	First match	Last match	Starting round	Final position	Pld	W	D	L	GF	GA	GD	Win %
Premier League	12 August 2017	13 May 2018	Matchday 1	16th	38	9	10	19	28	58	−30	23.68
FA Cup	6 January 2018	17 February 2018	Third round	Fifth round	4	2	1	1	7	5	+2	50.00
EFL Cup	23 August 2017	19 September 2017	Second round	Third round	2	1	0	1	2	2	+0	50.00
Total					44	12	11	21	37	65	−28	27.27

Last updated: 13 May 2018
Source: Competitions

=== Premier League ===
==== League table ====
Pos	Team	Pld	W	D	L	GF	GA	GD	Pts	Qualification or relegation
14	Watford	38	11	8	19	44	64	−20	41	
15	Brighton & Hove Albion	38	9	13	16	34	54	−20	40	
16	Huddersfield Town	38	9	10	19	28	58	−30	37	
17	Southampton	38	7	15	16	37	56	−19	36	
18	Swansea City (R)	38	8	9	21	28	56	−28	33	Relegation to EFL Championship

Source: Premier League
Rules for classification: 1) Points; 2) Goal difference; 3) Goals scored. 4) Play-offs (only if needed to decide champion, teams for relegation or teams for UEFA competitions).
(R) Relegated

==== Results summary ====
Overall								Home						Away					
Pld	W	D	L	GF	GA	GD	Pts	W	D	L	GF	GA	GD	W	D	L	GF	GA	GD
38	9	10	19	28	58	−30	37	6	5	8	16	25	−9	3	5	11	12	33	−21

Last updated: 13 May 2018.
Source: Premier League

==== Results by matchday ====
Matchday	1	2	3	4	5	6	7	8	9	10	11	12	13	14	15	16	17	18	19	20	21	22	23	24	25	26	27	28	29	30	31	32	33	34	35	36	37	38
Ground	A	H	H	A	H	A	H	A	H	A	H	A	H	A	A	H	H	A	A	H	H	A	H	A	H	A	H	A	A	H	H	A	A	H	A	H	A	H
Result	W	W	D	L	D	D	L	L	W	L	W	L	L	L	L	W	L	W	D	D	D	L	L	L	L	L	W	W	L	D	L	L	D	W	L	D	D	L
Position	1	1	3	6	6	8	11	11	11	11	10	10	11	14	16	11	12	11	11	11	11	11	14	14	17	19	17	14	15	15	15	16	16	15	16	16	16	16

Updated to match(es) played on 13 May 2018. Source:
A = Away; H = Home; W = Win; D = Draw; L = Loss

==== Matches ====
On 14 June 2017, the Premier League fixtures were announced.

12 August 2017 1	Crystal Palace	0–3	Huddersfield Town	Selhurst
15:00 BST	Puncheon (yellow card) 88'	Report	Ward 23' (o.g.); Mounié 26', 78', (yellow card) 73'; Smith (yellow card) 28'; Palmer (yellow card) 60'	Stadium: Selhurst Park; Attendance: 25,448; Referee: Jon Moss

20 August 2017 2	Huddersfield Town	1–0	Newcastle United	Huddersfield
13:30 BST	Mooy 50'; Billing (yellow card) 66'; Palmer (yellow card) 77'; Mounié (yellow card) 88'	Report	Ritchie (yellow card) 41'; Hayden (yellow card) 53'; Joselu (yellow card) 64'; Lascelles (yellow card) 90+1'	Stadium: John Smith's Stadium; Attendance: 24,128; Referee: Craig Pawson

26 August 2017 3	Huddersfield Town	0–0	Southampton	Huddersfield
15:00 BST		Report	Romeu (yellow card) 45+1'	Stadium: John Smith's Stadium; Attendance: 23,548; Referee: Stuart Attwell

11 September 2017 4	West Ham United	2–0	Huddersfield Town	Stratford
20:00 BST	Zabaleta (yellow card) 49'; Obiang 72'; Ayew 77'	Report	Jørgensen (yellow card) 25'; Billing (yellow card) 45'	Stadium: London Stadium; Attendance: 56,977; Referee: Kevin Friend

16 September 2017 5	Huddersfield Town	1–1	Leicester City	Huddersfield
15:00 BST	Schindler (yellow card) 40'; Depoitre 46'	Report	Vardy 50' (pen.); Okazaki (yellow card) 80'	Stadium: John Smith's Stadium; Attendance: 24,129; Referee: Jon Moss

23 September 2017 6	Burnley	0–0	Huddersfield Town	Burnley
15:00 BST	Cork (yellow card) 7'; Arfield (yellow card) 24'; Tarkowski (yellow card) 90'	Report	Sabiri (yellow card) 6'; Van La Parra (yellow card) 71'	Stadium: Turf Moor; Attendance: 20,759; Referee: Chris Kavanagh

30 September 2017 7	Huddersfield Town	0–4	Tottenham Hotspur	Huddersfield
12:30 BST	Kachunga (yellow card) 65'	Report	Kane 9', 23'; Davies 16'; Alli (yellow card) 58'; Sissoko 90+1'	Stadium: John Smith's Stadium; Attendance: 24,169; Referee: Neil Swarbrick

14 October 2017 8	Swansea City	2–0	Huddersfield Town	Swansea
15:00 BST	Fer (yellow card) 2'; Abraham 42', 48'	Report	Schindler (yellow card) 25'; Smith (yellow card) 45'; Hogg (yellow card) 45+1'; Jørgensen (yellow card) 45+2'; Van La Parra (yellow card) 66'	Stadium: Liberty Stadium; Attendance: 20,657; Referee: Paul Tierney

21 October 2017 9	Huddersfield Town	2–1	Manchester United	Huddersfield
15:00 BST	Smith (yellow card) 8'; Schindler (yellow card) 9'; Mooy 28', (yellow card) 66'; Depoitre 33'; Williams (yellow card) 79'	Report	Martial (yellow card) 8'; Young (yellow card) 60'; Rashford 78'	Stadium: John Smith's Stadium; Attendance: 24,169; Referee: Lee Mason

28 October 2017 10	Liverpool	3–0	Huddersfield Town	Liverpool
15:00 BST	Sturridge 50'; Firmino 58'; Wijnaldum 75'	Report	Smith (yellow card) 41'	Stadium: Anfield; Attendance: 53,268; Referee: Kevin Friend

4 November 2017 11	Huddersfield Town	1–0	West Bromwich Albion	Huddersfield
15:00 GMT	Van La Parra 44'; Schindler (yellow card) 25' (yellow-red card) 57'; Williams (yellow card) 70'	Report	Hegazi (yellow card) 31'; Nyom (yellow card) 35'; Barry (yellow card) 53'; McClean (yellow card) 90+5'	Stadium: John Smith's Stadium; Attendance: 24,169; Referee: Roger East

18 November 2017 12	Bournemouth	4–0	Huddersfield Town	Bournemouth
15:00 GMT	Wilson 26', 31', 84'; Francis (yellow card) 35' (yellow-red card) 45+4'; Arter 70'	Report		Stadium: Vitality Stadium; Attendance: 10,879; Referee: Lee Probert

26 November 2017 13	Huddersfield Town	1–2	Manchester City	Huddersfield
16:00 GMT	Otamendi 45+1' (o.g.); Hogg (yellow card) 56'; Malone (yellow card) 64'; Van La Parra (red card) 90+6'	Report	Agüero 47' (pen.); Fernandinho (yellow card) 63'; Sterling 84'; D. Silva (yellow card) 86'; Sané (yellow card) 90+6'	Stadium: John Smith's Stadium; Attendance: 24,121; Referee: Craig Pawson

29 November 2017 14	Arsenal	5–0	Huddersfield Town	Holloway
19:45 GMT	Lacazette 3'; Giroud 68', 87'; Sánchez 69'; Özil 72'	Report	Mooy (yellow card) 60'	Stadium: Emirates Stadium; Attendance: 59,285; Referee: Graham Scott

2 December 2017 15	Everton	2–0	Huddersfield Town	Walton
15:00 GMT	Kenny (yellow card) 23'; Davies (yellow card) 23'; Sigurðsson 47'; Calvert-Lewin 73'	Report	Malone (yellow card) 22'	Stadium: Goodison Park; Attendance: 39,167; Referee: Chris Kavanagh

9 December 2017 16	Huddersfield Town	2–0	Brighton & Hove Albion	Huddersfield
15:00 GMT	Mounié 12', 43'	Report		Stadium: John Smith's Stadium; Attendance: 24,018; Referee: Stuart Attwell

12 December 2017 17	Huddersfield Town	1–3	Chelsea	Huddersfield
20:00 GMT	Depoitre 90+2'	Report	Bakayoko 23'; Willian 43'; Pedro 50'	Stadium: John Smith's Stadium; Attendance: 24,169; Referee: Andre Marriner

16 December 2017 18	Watford	1–4	Huddersfield Town	Watford
15:00 GMT	Deeney (red card) 33'; Doucouré (yellow card) 41', (goal) 68'; Janmaat (yellow card) 89'	Report	Kachunga 6'; Mooy 23', 89' (pen.); Depoitre 50', (yellow card) 69'; Hogg (yellow card) 37' (yellow-red card) 61'	Stadium: Vicarage Road; Attendance: 20,026; Referee: Michael Oliver

23 December 2017 19	Southampton	1–1	Huddersfield Town	Southampton
15:00 GMT	Austin 24'; Hoedt (yellow card) 54'; Redmond (yellow card) 90+7'	Report	Depoitre 64'; Quaner (yellow card) 90+7'	Stadium: St Mary's Stadium; Attendance: 29,675; Referee: Lee Probert

26 December 2017 20	Huddersfield Town	1–1	Stoke City	Huddersfield
15:00 GMT	Ince 10'; Schindler (yellow card) 59'; Jørgensen (yellow card) 85'	Report	Sobhi 60', (yellow card) 60'; Cameron (yellow card) 69'; Zouma (yellow card) 72'; Diouf (yellow card) 76'	Stadium: John Smith's Stadium; Attendance: 24,047; Referee: Anthony Taylor

30 December 2017 21	Huddersfield Town	0–0	Burnley	Huddersfield
15:00 GMT	Jørgensen (yellow card) 12'; Lolley (yellow card) 90+3'	Report	Mee (yellow card) 76'	Stadium: John Smith's Stadium; Attendance: 24,095; Referee: Paul Tierney

1 January 2018 22	Leicester City	3–0	Huddersfield Town	Leicester
15:00 GMT	Morgan (yellow card) 24'; Mahrez 53'; Slimani 60'; Albrighton 90+2'	Report	Malone (yellow card) 84'	Stadium: King Power Stadium; Attendance: 31,748; Referee: Graham Scott

13 January 2018 23	Huddersfield Town	1–4	West Ham United	Huddersfield
15:00 GMT	Smith (yellow card) 31'; Lolley 40'	Report	Noble 25'; Arnautović 46'; Lanzini 56', 61'; Cresswell (yellow card) 76'	Stadium: John Smith's Stadium; Attendance: 24,105; Referee: Jon Moss

20 January 2018 24	Stoke City	2–0	Huddersfield Town	Stoke-on-Trent
15:00 GMT	Allen 53'; Diouf 69'; Bauer (yellow card) 72'	Report	Hogg (yellow card) 34'	Stadium: Bet365 Stadium; Attendance: 29,785; Referee: Michael Oliver

30 January 2018 25	Huddersfield Town	0–3	Liverpool	Huddersfield
20:00 GMT		Report	Can 26'; Firmino 45+1'; Salah 78' (pen.)	Stadium: John Smith's Stadium; Attendance: 24,121; Referee: Kevin Friend

3 February 2018 26	Manchester United	2–0	Huddersfield Town	Manchester
15:00 GMT	Mata (yellow card) 27'; Sánchez (yellow card) 45+2', (goal) 68'; Lukaku 55'	Report	Billing (yellow card) 23'; Smith (yellow card) 48'; Hogg (yellow card) 59'; Hefele (yellow card) 64'	Stadium: Old Trafford; Attendance: 74,742; Referee: Stuart Attwell

11 February 2018 27	Huddersfield Town	4–1	Bournemouth	Huddersfield
12:00 GMT	Pritchard 7'; Mounié 27'; S. Cook 66' (o.g.); Van La Parra 90+5' (pen.)	Report	Stanislas 13'; Gosling (yellow card) 18'; Francis (yellow card) 56'; Mousset (yellow card) 71'	Stadium: John Smith's Stadium; Attendance: 23,823; Referee: Michael Oliver

24 February 2018 28	West Bromwich Albion	1–2	Huddersfield Town	West Bromwich
15:00 GMT	Dawson 64'; Evans (yellow card) 83'	Report	Hadergjonaj (yellow card) 30'; Van La Parra 48'; Mounié 56'	Stadium: The Hawthorns; Attendance: 25,920; Referee: Jon Moss

3 March 2018 29	Tottenham Hotspur	2–0	Huddersfield Town	Wembley
15:00 GMT	Alli (yellow card) 20'; Son 27', 54'	Report	Hogg (yellow card) 61'	Stadium: Wembley Stadium; Attendance: 68,311; Referee: Kevin Friend

10 March 2018 30	Huddersfield Town	0–0	Swansea City	Huddersfield
15:00 GMT		Report	J. Ayew (red card) 11'	Stadium: John Smith's Stadium; Attendance: 23,567; Referee: Michael Oliver

17 March 2018 31	Huddersfield Town	0–2	Crystal Palace	Huddersfield
15:00 GMT	Hogg (yellow card) 70'; Mooy (yellow card) 78'; Schindler (yellow card) 82'	Report	Tomkins 23'; Cabaye (yellow card) 57'; Milivojević 68' (pen.); Wan-Bissaka (yellow card) 80'	Stadium: John Smith's Stadium; Attendance: 23,918; Referee: Mike Dean

31 March 2018 32	Newcastle United	1–0	Huddersfield Town	Newcastle upon Tyne
15:00 GMT	Lascelles (yellow card) 8'; Pérez 80'	Report	Mooy (yellow card) 6'; Hogg (yellow card) 28'; Schindler (yellow card) 60'; Quaner (yellow card) 84'	Stadium: St James' Park; Attendance: 52,261; Referee: Martin Atkinson

7 April 2018 33	Brighton & Hove Albion	1–1	Huddersfield Town	Falmer
15:00 GMT	Lössl 29' (o.g.); Duffy (yellow card) 58'; Pröpper (red card) 74'	Report	Mounié 32'	Stadium: Falmer Stadium; Attendance: 30,501; Referee: Anthony Taylor

14 April 2018 34	Huddersfield Town	1–0	Watford	Huddersfield
15:00 GMT	Jørgensen (yellow card) 45'; Pritchard (yellow card) 73'; Ince 90+1'	Report	Janmaat (yellow card) 20'; Pereyra (yellow card) 33'	Stadium: John Smith's Stadium; Attendance: 23,961; Referee: Craig Pawson

28 April 2018 35	Huddersfield Town	0–2	Everton	Huddersfield
15:00 GMT	Hogg (yellow card) 50'	Report	Tosun 39'; Gueye 77'	Stadium: John Smith's Stadium; Attendance: 24,121; Referee: Lee Probert

6 May 2018 36	Manchester City	0–0	Huddersfield Town	Manchester
13:30 GMT		Report	Smith (yellow card) 66'; Löwe (yellow card) 76'; Van La Parra (yellow card) 87'	Stadium: City of Manchester Stadium; Attendance: 54,350; Referee: Mike Dean

9 May 2018 37	Chelsea	1–1	Huddersfield Town	Fulham
19:45 GMT	Alonso 62'	Report	Depoitre 50'; Lössl (yellow card) 88'	Stadium: Stamford Bridge; Attendance: 38,910; Referee: Lee Mason

13 May 2018 38	Huddersfield Town	0–1	Arsenal	Huddersfield
15:00 GMT	Jørgensen (yellow card) 90+3'	Report	Aubameyang 38'	Stadium: John Smith's Stadium; Attendance: 24,122; Referee: Michael Oliver

=== FA Cup ===
In the FA Cup, Huddersfield Town entered the competition in the third round and were drawn away to Bolton Wanderers.

6 January 2018 Third round	Bolton Wanderers	1–2	Huddersfield Town	Horwich
15:00 GMT	Vela (yellow card) 18'; Ameobi (yellow card) 54'; Derik 64'	Report	Hefele (yellow card) 40'; Van La Parra 51'; Williams 52'; Coleman (yellow card) 88'	Stadium: Macron Stadium; Attendance: 11,574; Referee: Roger East

27 January 2018 Fourth round	Huddersfield Town	1–1	Birmingham City	Huddersfield
15:00 GMT	Mounie 21'	Report	Dean (yellow card) 24'; Jutkiewicz 54'; Morrison (yellow card) 90+2'	Stadium: John Smith's Stadium; Attendance: 13,047; Referee: Neil Swarbrick

6 February 2018 Fourth round replay	Birmingham City	1–4 (a.e.t.)	Huddersfield Town	Birmingham
19:45 GMT	Adams 52'	Report	Roberts 60' (o.g.); Mounié 94'; Van La Parra 97'; Ince 106'	Stadium: St Andrew's; Attendance: 13,175; Referee: Paul Tierney

17 February 2018 Fifth round	Huddersfield Town	0–2	Manchester United	Huddersfield
17:30 GMT		Report	Lukaku 3', 55'	Stadium: John Smith's Stadium; Attendance: 17,861; Referee: Kevin Friend

=== EFL Cup ===
Huddersfield Town were drawn at home to Rotherham United as they entered into the second round of the competition. The Terriers were drawn away in the third round, against Crystal Palace.

23 August 2017 Second round	Huddersfield Town	2–1	Rotherham United	Huddersfield
19:45 BST	Billing 52' (pen.); Lolley 55'; Hefele (yellow card) 89'	Report	Ajayi 1'; Purrington (yellow card) 89'	Stadium: John Smith's Stadium; Attendance: 8,290; Referee: Peter Bankes

19 September 2017 Third round	Crystal Palace	1–0	Huddersfield Town	South Norwood
19:45 BST	Sako 13'; Tomkins (yellow card) 36'; Lee (yellow card) 60'; Sakho (yellow card) 69'	Report		Stadium: Selhurst Park; Attendance: 6,607; Referee: Lee Probert
