= Jonathan Hogg =

English footballer

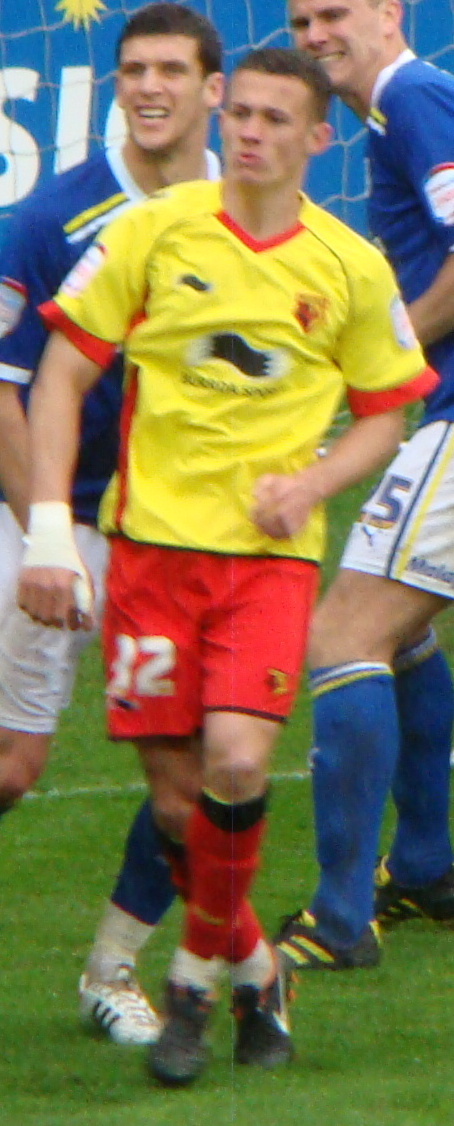
- Hogg playing for Watford in 2012

Personal information
- Full name: Jonathan Lee Hogg
- Date of birth: 6 December 1988 (age 37)
- Place of birth: Middlesbrough, England
- Height: 5 ft 7 in (1.70 m)
- Position: Defensive midfielder

Youth career
- 1997–2002: Middlesbrough
- 2004–2009: Aston Villa

Senior career*
Years	Team	Apps	(Gls)
2009–2011	Aston Villa	5	(0)
2009–2010	→ Darlington (loan)	5	(1)
2011	→ Portsmouth (loan)	19	(0)
2011–2013	Watford	78	(0)
2013–2025	Huddersfield Town	382	(5)
- * Club domestic league appearances and goals as of 23:12, 6 May 2025 (UTC)

Jonathan Lee Hogg (born 6 December 1988) is an English professional footballer and coach who plays as a defensive midfielder and player-coach for the Huddersfield Town Academy. He has previously played for Watford and Aston Villa, and has spent periods at Darlington and Portsmouth.

== Career ==
=== Aston Villa ===
Hogg was born in Middlesbrough, North Yorkshire. A midfielder, he began his football career as a junior with hometown club Middlesbrough, before joining Aston Villa. His progress was interrupted by a cruciate ligament injury in March 2007, but he came back to become Villa's reserve team's leading goalscorer as they won the 2008–09 Premier Reserve League Southern section. Handed a two-year contract in July 2008, he was part of Villa's squad that won the 2009 Peace Cup, a pre-season tournament.

On 19 August 2010, Hogg made his first competitive start for Aston Villa in a 1–1 draw away to Rapid Vienna in the Europa League Play-off round. Owing to injuries to several other midfield players, he made his Premier League debut in the home match against Manchester United on 13 November 2010. In December 2010, Hogg signed a new contract to tie him to the club until 2013.

==== Darlington (loan) ====
In November 2009, Hogg joined League Two's last-placed side Darlington on loan for six weeks. He made his debut in the Football League on 21 November away at Chesterfield; he played the whole game, and scored in the 87th minute to set up a close finish, but Chesterfield's Scott Boden scored twice very late in the game to make the final score 5–2.

==== Portsmouth (loan) ====
On 25 January 2011, Hogg joined Championship club Portsmouth on loan until the end of the season. He made his debut the same day in a 2–1 home league defeat to Burnley.

=== Watford ===
Hogg joined Football League Championship club Watford for an undisclosed fee on 27 August 2011, signing a three-year contract, joining his former Villa youth teammate, Troy Deeney, at Vicarage Road in the process. He made his debut for Watford two days later against Aston Villa's arch-rivals, Birmingham City. Hogg finished the season having started 40 games in the league and came fourth in the Watford F.C. Player of the Season award.

Hogg has the assist for one of English football's most famous goals, when his knockdown of a Fernando Forestieri cross in the 96th minute of the second leg of the 2013 Championship Play-Off Semi-final drew out Leicester City goalkeeper Kasper Schmeichel. The ball fell in the path of Deeney, who scored the winning goal, sending Watford on to the final. The opportunity immediately followed a double-save by Watford goalkeeper Manuel Almunia on a penalty and follow-up by Leicester midfielder Anthony Knockaert, which, if converted, would have sent Leicester on instead of Watford. Hogg and Deeney celebrated the winner by leaping into the old East Stand at Vicarage Road, part of the ensuing celebratory pitch invasion at Watford's home ground.

=== Huddersfield Town ===
Despite being a first-team regular at Watford, Hogg joined Huddersfield Town on a three-year contract on 29 July 2013, motivated by family reasons to request the transfer. He made his debut for the Terriers in their 1–0 defeat to Nottingham Forest on 3 August. He scored his first goal for the club in the 3–2 win over Charlton Athletic in the Football League Cup on 27 August 2013. His first league goal for the Terriers came in their 2–1 win over Barnsley on 20 August 2016, his first league goal in seven years.

In the 2016–17 season, Huddersfield Town gained promotion to the Premier League for the first time. Hogg was voted "Player's Player of the Year" by his teammates. During that season, Hogg suffered a collision with a teammate and was taken to hospital after a defeat away at Bristol City on 17 March 2017. He was initially ruled out for the remainder of the season after fears that he had fractured his neck. However, after further scans, he was allowed to return less than a month later on 5 April for a victory against Norwich City.

On 9 August 2017, manager David Wagner appointed Tommy Smith as the club captain with Hogg and German defender Christopher Schindler as his deputies.

During his twelve-year stint at Huddersfield, the tough-tackling central midfielder became a crowd favourite, making over 382 appearances for the club, scoring 5.

==== 2020–21 ====
On 13 March 2021, the former Huddersfield manager, Danny Cowley, referred to Hogg as "...a fantastic professional. He brings so much to the team, not only in terms of his ability as a player but also the substance he brings. When he plays he gives them the grit and the determination that Huddersfield need".

Hogg scored just his second goal for Huddersfield on 7 April 2021, a header from a corner, which proved to be a consolation in a home 2–1 defeat to AFC Bournemouth. On 7 May 2021, he was named by supporters as the club's Blue & White Foundation Player of the Year, ahead of teammate Lewis O'Brien. Two weeks later, Hogg also received the Hargreaves Memorial Player of the Year Trophy, receiving 35% of supporters' votes.

==== 2021–22 ====
On 29 June 2021 Hogg was appointed club captain. Head Coach Carlos Corberán was quoted as saying "Being a Captain is not only when you have the armband on a game day. You must lead by example. You must be a professional footballer 24/7 and bring everyone else up to your standards, so they have the same mentality. We know that Hoggy will do that.".

On 14 September 2021 Hogg scored his first league goal for Huddersfield in a 3–0 away win at Blackpool. He chested the ball down and struck a half volley from just outside the area into the top corner of the goal. On 30 October 2021, Hogg scored his second league goal of the season, a career best, with a late winner with a header at home to Millwall from a Sorba Thomas corner, to make it 1-0 to the Terriers.

=== 2025–present ===
On 5 May 2025, Huddersfield announced that Hogg would be released in June when his contract expired. On 10 November 2025, it was announced that he had re-joined the club as a player-coach for the club's academy.

== Career statistics ==
As of match played 10 February 2024

Appearances and goals by club, season and competition
Club	Season	League			FA Cup		League Cup		Europe		Other		Total	
Club	Season	Division	Apps	Goals	Apps	Goals	Apps	Goals	Apps	Goals	Apps	Goals	Apps	Goals
Aston Villa	2009–10	Premier League	0	0	0	0	0	0	0	0	0	0	0	0
Aston Villa	2010–11	Premier League	5	0	0	0	1	0	1 (Note: Appearances in UEFA Europa League)	0	0	0	7	0
Aston Villa	2011–12	Premier League	0	0	—		0	0	—		0	0	0	0
Aston Villa	Total		5	0	0	0	1	0	1	0	0	0	7	0
Darlington (loan)	2009–10	League Two	5	1	—		—		—		—		5	1
Portsmouth (loan)	2010–11	Championship	19	0	—		—		—		—		19	0
Watford	2011–12	Championship	40	0	1	0	—		—		—		41	0
Watford	2012–13	Championship	38	0	0	0	2	0	—		3 (Note: Appearances in Championship play-offs)	0	43	0
Watford	Total		78	0	1	0	2	0	—		3	0	84	0
Huddersfield Town	2013–14	Championship	34	0	1	0	2	1	—		—		37	1
Huddersfield Town	2014–15	Championship	26	0	1	0	0	0	—		—		27	0
Huddersfield Town	2015–16	Championship	22	0	2	0	0	0	—		—		24	0
Huddersfield Town	2016–17	Championship	37	1	2	0	1	0	—		3	0	43	1
Huddersfield Town	2017–18	Premier League	30	0	2	0	1	0	—		—		33	0
Huddersfield Town	2018–19	Premier League	29	0	1	0	0	0	—		—		30	0
Huddersfield Town	2019–20	Championship	37	0	1	0	0	0	—		—		38	0
Huddersfield Town	2020–21	Championship	37	1	0	0	1	0	—		—		38	1
Huddersfield Town	2021–22	Championship	31	2	2	0	1	0	—		3	0	37	2
Huddersfield Town	2022–23	Championship	30	0	0	0	0	0	—		—		30	0
Huddersfield Town	2023–24	Championship	27	0	0	0	1	0	—		—		28	0
Huddersfield Town	Total		340	4	12	0	7	1	—		6	0	365	5
Career total			447	5	13	0	10	1	1	0	9	0	480	6

== Honours ==
Huddersfield Town

- EFL Championship play-offs: 2017

Individual

- Huddersfield Town Players' Player of the Year: 2016–17
- Huddersfield Town Blue & White Foundation Player of the Year: 2021
- Huddersfield Town Hargreaves Memorial Trophy Player of the Year: 2021
