= 2019–20 Huddersfield Town A.F.C. season =

Huddersfield Town
2019–20 season
- Chairman: Phil Hodgkinson
- Head Coach: Jan Siewert (until 16 August); Danny Cowley (from 9 September 2019 until 19 July 2020); Danny Schofield (caretaker)
- Stadium: John Smith's Stadium
- Championship: 18th
- FA Cup: Third round (eliminated by Southampton)
- EFL Cup: First round (eliminated by Lincoln City)
- Top goalscorer: League: Karlan Grant (19); All: Karlan Grant (19)
- Highest home attendance: 23,805 vs. Leeds United (7 December 2019)
- Lowest home attendance: 6,908 vs. Lincoln City (13 August 2019)
- Biggest win: 4–0 vs Charlton Athletic (29 February 2020)
- Biggest defeat: 0–3 vs Cardiff City (12 February 2020); 1–4 vs Millwall (22 July 2020); 2–5 vs Bristol City (30 November 2019); 2–5 vs Stoke City (1 January 2020)
Home colours	Away colours	Third colours

The 2019–20 season was Huddersfield Town's 111th year in existence and their first season back in the EFL Championship after relegation from the Premier League. Along with competing in the Championship, the club also participated in the FA Cup and the EFL Cup.

The season covered the period from 1 July 2019 to 22 July 2020.

== Technical staff ==
Position	Name
Manager	(England) Danny Cowley
Assistant manager	(England) Nicky Cowley
Head of goalkeeping	(England) Paul Clements
Head of performance services	(England) John Iga
Head of medical	(England) Ian Kirkpatrick

== Transfers ==
=== Transfers in ===
Date	Position	Nationality	Name	From	Fee	Team	Ref.
1 July 2019	MF	(England)	Tim Akinola	(England) Lincoln City	Compensation	Academy	
1 July 2019	CM	(England)	Reece Brown	(England) Forest Green Rovers	Undisclosed	First team	
1 July 2019	CB	(England)	Tommy Elphick	(England) Aston Villa	Free transfer	First team	
1 July 2019	CF	(England)	Josh Koroma	(England) Leyton Orient	Undisclosed	First team	
1 July 2019	LW	(England)	Will McCamley	(England) South Shields	Undisclosed	Academy	
5 July 2019	MF	(England)	Luke Daley	(England) Port Vale	Undisclosed	Academy	
5 July 2019	FW	(England)	Kai Herbert	(England) Morecambe	Undisclosed	Academy	
7 July 2019	RB	(Sint Maarten)	Ilounga Pata	(Netherlands) Alphense Boys	Undisclosed	Academy	
8 July 2019	RB	(Uganda)	Herbert Bockhorn	(Germany) Borussia Dortmund II	Undisclosed	First team	
9 July 2019	RW	(Belgium)	Isaac Mbenza	(France) Montpellier	Undisclosed	First team	
12 August 2019	CF	(England)	Fraizer Campbell	(England) Hull City	Free transfer	First team	
27 September 2019	RB	(England)	Danny Simpson	(England) Leicester City	Free transfer	First team	
10 January 2020	CB	(England)	Richard Stearman	(England) Sheffield United	Free transfer	First team	
17 January 2020	LB	(England)	Harry Toffolo	(England) Lincoln City	Undisclosed	First team	

=== Loans in ===
Date	Position	Nationality	Name	From	Date until	Team	Ref.
15 July 2019	GK	(Poland)	Kamil Grabara	(England) Liverpool	30 June 2020	First team	
8 August 2019	CB	(England)	Trevoh Chalobah	(England) Chelsea	30 June 2020	First team	
10 January 2020	LM	(England)	Emile Smith Rowe	(England) Arsenal	30 June 2020	First team	
16 January 2020	CM	(Wales)	Andy King	(England) Leicester City	30 June 2020	First team	
31 January 2020	GK	(Denmark)	Jonas Lössl	(England) Everton	30 June 2020	First team	
31 January 2020	CF	(England)	Kieran Phillips	(England) Everton	30 June 2020	Under-23s	
31 January 2020	LW	(England)	Chris Willock	(Portugal) Benfica	30 June 2020	First team	

=== Transfers out ===
Date	Position	Nationality	Name	To	Fee	Team	Ref.
24 May 2019	LB	(Germany)	Chris Löwe	(Germany) Dynamo Dresden	Undisclosed	First team	
1 July 2019	CB	(England)	Jake Barrett	Free agent	Released	Under-23s	
1 July 2019	MF	(England)	Regan Booty	(England) Notts County	Released	Under-23s	
1 July 2019	FW	(England)	George Danaher	Free agent	Released	Academy	
1 July 2019	CF	(Belgium)	Laurent Depoitre	(Belgium) Gent	Released	First team	
1 July 2019	LB	(Germany)	Erik Durm	(Germany) Eintracht Frankfurt	Released	First team	
1 July 2019	DF	(England)	Jordan Eli	Free agent	Released	Academy	
1 July 2019	DF	(England)	Sam Gibson	(England) Emley	Released	Academy	
1 July 2019	GK	(Denmark)	Jonas Lössl	(England) Everton	Released	First team	
1 July 2019	RW	(England)	Ben Mills	(England) Emley	Released	Academy	
1 July 2019	DF	(England)	Mason O'Malley	(England) Scunthorpe United	Released	Academy	
1 July 2019	AM	(England)	Jack Payne	(England) Lincoln City	Released	First team	
1 July 2019	MF	(England)	Dahomey Raymond	Free agent	Released	Academy	
1 July 2019	GK	(United States)	Gabriel Rosario	Free agent	Released	Under-23s	
1 July 2019	LB	(England)	Harry Spratt	(England) York City	Released	Under-23s	
1 July 2019	DM	(United States)	Danny Williams	(Cyprus) Pafos	Released	First team	
15 July 2019	RB	(England)	Tommy Smith	(England) Stoke City	Undisclosed	First team	
29 July 2019	CM	(Denmark)	Philip Billing	(England) Bournemouth	Undisclosed	First team	
10 August 2019	CB	(Denmark)	Mathias Jørgensen	(Turkey) Fenerbahçe	Undisclosed	First team	
27 August 2019	AM	(Germany)	Abdelhamid Sabiri	(Germany) Paderborn	Mutual consent	First team	
31 August 2019	RW	(Netherlands)	Rajiv van La Parra	(Serbia) Red Star Belgrade	Undisclosed	First team	
24 January 2020	CM	(Australia)	Aaron Mooy	(England) Brighton & Hove Albion	Undisclosed	First team	

=== Loans out ===
Date	Position	Nationality	Name	To	Date until	Team	Ref.
3 July 2019	CF	(England)	Rekeil Pyke	(England) Rochdale	5 January 2020	Under-23s	
5 July 2019	LW	(Egypt)	Ramadan Sobhi	(Egypt) Al Ahly	30 June 2020	First team	
25 July 2019	LM	(England)	Ben Jackson	(England) Stockport County	5 December 2019	Academy	
27 July 2019	CF	(England)	Olly Dyson	(England) Barrow	30 June 2020	Under-23s	
29 July 2019	LB	(England)	Romoney Crichlow-Noble	(England) Hartlepool United	17 January 2020	Academy	
2 August 2019	CM	(England)	Jaheim Headley	(England) Bradford (Park Avenue)	30 June 2020	Academy	
2 August 2019	DM	(England)	Isaac Marriott	(England) Bradford (Park Avenue)	30 June 2020	Academy	
8 August 2019	CM	(Australia)	Aaron Mooy	(England) Brighton & Hove Albion	30 June 2020	First team	
8 August 2019	GK	(England)	Ben Hamer	(England) Derby County	30 June 2020	First team	
16 August 2019	RW	(England)	Andrew Ijiwole	(England) Ossett United	30 June 2020	Academy	
16 August 2019	AM	(England)	Dom Tear	(England) Gateshead	30 June 2020	Academy	
16 August 2019	DF	(England)	Oran Thompson	(England) Hyde United	30 June 2020	Academy	
16 October 2019	MF	(England)	Tim Akinola	(England) Brighouse Town		Academy	
21 October 2019	RB	(England)	Demeaco Duhaney	(England) Boston United	5 December 2019	Under-23s	
25 October 2019	CB	(England)	Rarmani Edmonds-Green	(England) Bromley	5 December 2019	Academy	
8 November 2019	FW	(England)	Kit Elliott	(England) Concord Rangers	6 January 2020	Academy	
8 November 2019	CM	(England)	Scott High	(England) Concord Rangers	5 December 2019	Academy	
6 December 2019	MF	(England)	Aaron Rowe	(England) Boston United	6 January 2020	Academy	
3 January 2020	CM	(England)	Reece Brown	(England) Peterborough United	30 June 2020	First team	
4 January 2020	LM	(England)	Ben Jackson	(England) Stockport County	30 June 2020	Academy	
7 January 2020	GK	(England)	Ryan Schofield	(Scotland) Livingston	30 June 2020	Academy	
10 January 2020	CB	(England)	Mustapha Olagunju	(England) Tadcaster Albion	February 2020	Academy	
13 January 2020	CB	(England)	Rarmani Edmonds-Green	(England) Swindon Town	30 June 2020	First team	
16 January 2020	CB	(Netherlands)	Terence Kongolo	(England) Fulham	30 June 2020	First team	
17 January 2020	CB	(England)	Romoney Crichlow-Noble	(England) Welling United	30 June 2020	Academy	
17 January 2020	CF	(England)	Kian Harratt	(England) Harrogate Town	13 February 2020	Academy	
17 January 2020	DF	(England)	Jaheim Headley	(England) Hyde United	Work experience	Academy	
17 January 2020	CB	(England)	Nassim Kherbouche	(England) Emley	Work experience	Academy	
21 January 2020	RM	(France)	Adama Diakhaby	(England) Nottingham Forest	30 June 2020	First team	
31 January 2020	RB	(Kosovo)	Florent Hadergjonaj	(Turkey) Kasımpaşa	30 June 2020	First team	
31 January 2020	CF	(England)	Josh Koroma	(England) Rotherham United	30 June 2020	First team	
31 January 2020	MF	(England)	Aaron Rowe	(England) Bromley	March 2020	Academy	
3 February 2020	RW	(Belgium)	Isaac Mbenza	(France) Amiens	30 June 2020	First team	
29 February 2020	CM	(England)	Scott High	(England) Concord Rangers	30 June 2020	Academy	
7 March 2020	AM	(England)	Josh Austerfield	(England) Brighouse Town	30 March 2020	Academy	

== Pre-season ==
In June 2019. HTAFC announced their pre-season schedule.

10 July 2019 Friendly	(Germany) Greuther Fürth	1–1	Huddersfield Town	Wörgl, Austria
11:00 CEST	Coleman 17' (o.g.)	Report	Grant 49'	Stadium: Sportstadion Wörgl

10 July 2019 Friendly	(Germany) Greuther Fürth	0–1	Huddersfield Town	Brixen im Thale, Austria
17:00 CEST		Report	Grant 83'	Stadium: Sportverein Brixen

13 July 2019 Friendly	(Germany) Hamburger SV	0–1	Huddersfield Town	Kitzbühel, Austria
16:00 CEST		Report	Diakhaby 22'	Stadium: Sportplatz Kitzbühel-Langau

17 July 2019 Friendly	Rochdale	1–3	Huddersfield Town	Rochdale
19:45 BST	Henderson 9'	Report	Kachunga 44'; Hogg 60'; Koroma 63'	Stadium: Crown Oil Arena; Attendance: 1,850

24 July 2019 Friendly	Doncaster Rovers	0–2	Huddersfield Town	Doncaster
19:30 BST	Wright (yellow card) 56' (yellow-red card) 59'	Report	van La Parra 29'; Bacuna 49'	Stadium: Keepmoat Stadium; Attendance: 3,062

27 July 2019 Friendly	Huddersfield Town	1–1	(France) Montpellier	Huddersfield
15:00 BST	Grant 55'	Report	Laborde 15'	Stadium: John Smith’s Stadium; Attendance: 5,383

== Competitions ==
=== Overview ===
Competition	First match	Last match	Starting round	Final position	Record							
Competition	First match	Last match	Starting round	Final position	Pld	W	D	L	GF	GA	GD	Win %
EFL Championship	5 August 2019	22 July 2020	Matchday 1	18th	46	13	12	21	52	70	−18	28.26
FA Cup	4 January 2020	4 January 2020	Third round	Third round	1	0	0	1	0	2	−2	0.00
EFL Cup	13 August 2019	13 August 2019	First round	First round	1	0	0	1	0	1	−1	0.00
Total					48	13	12	23	52	73	−21	27.08

Last updated: 22 July 2020
Source: Competitions

=== League table ===
Pos	Team	Pld	W	D	L	GF	GA	GD	Pts
15	Stoke City	46	16	8	22	62	68	−6	56
16	Sheffield Wednesday	46	15	11	20	58	66	−8	56
17	Middlesbrough	46	13	14	19	48	61	−13	53
18	Huddersfield Town	46	13	12	21	52	70	−18	51
19	Luton Town	46	14	9	23	54	82	−28	51
20	Birmingham City	46	12	14	20	54	75	−21	50
21	Barnsley	46	12	13	21	49	69	−20	49

Source: EFL Official Website
Rules for classification: 1) Points; 2) Goal difference; 3) Number of goals scored; 4) Head-to-head results; 5) Wins; 6) Away goals; 7) Penalty points (sec 9.5); 8) 12-point sending off offences

==== Results summary ====
Overall								Home						Away					
Pld	W	D	L	GF	GA	GD	Pts	W	D	L	GF	GA	GD	W	D	L	GF	GA	GD
46	13	12	21	52	70	−18	51	8	6	9	26	30	−4	5	6	12	26	40	−14

Last updated: 22 July 2020.

==== Results by matchday ====
Matchday	1	2	3	4	5	6	7	8	9	10	11	12	13	14	15	16	17	18	19	20	21	22	23	24	25	26	27	28	29	30	31	32	33	34	35	36	37	38	39	40	41	42	43	44	45	46
Ground	H	A	H	A	H	A	H	A	H	A	H	A	H	H	A	A	H	H	A	H	A	A	H	A	H	H	A	H	A	A	H	H	A	A	H	H	A	H	A	A	H	A	H	A	H	A
Result	L	D	L	L	L	L	L	L	D	W	W	D	D	W	W	L	D	D	L	L	W	D	W	L	W	L	L	D	W	L	W	L	D	L	W	W	L	L	L	W	D	D	L	D	W	L
Position	16	19	23	23	23	23	23	24	23	22	21	22	22	20	18	19	19	19	19	21	19	19	19	20	20	20	20	20	19	20	19	20	20	21	19	17	18	20	22	19	20	19	20	20	17	18

Updated to match(es) played on 22 July 2020. Source: BBC Sport
A = Away; H = Home; W = Win; D = Draw; L = Loss

==== Matches ====
On 20 June 2019, the EFL Championship fixtures were revealed.

5 August 2019 1	Huddersfield Town	1–2	Derby County	Huddersfield
19:45 BST	Grant 30' (pen.)	Report	Lawrence 22', 25'	Stadium: John Smith's Stadium; Attendance: 22,596; Referee: Darren Bond
Note: Live on Sky Sports

10 August 2019 2	Queens Park Rangers	1–1	Huddersfield Town	Shepherd’s Bush
15:00 BST	Barbet (yellow card) 48'; Hall 83'; Osayi-Samuel (yellow card) 90+4'	Report	Diakhaby (yellow card) 2'; Bacuna (yellow card) 43'; Grant 49' (pen.) (yellow card) 90+2'; O'Brien (yellow card) 69'; Quaner (yellow card) 79'	Stadium: Loftus Road; Attendance: 14,377; Referee: Dean Whitestone

16 August 2019 3	Huddersfield Town	1–2	Fulham	Huddersfield
19:45 BST	Grant 57'; Kachunga (yellow card) 62'; Hogg (yellow card) 71'	Report	Sessegnon (yellow card) 15'; Mitrović 51'; Mawson (yellow card) 58'; Cavaleiro 80'	Stadium: John Smith’s Stadium; Attendance: 20,775; Referee: James Linington
Note: Live on Sky Sports

21 August 2019 4	Cardiff City	2–1	Huddersfield Town	Cardiff
19:45 BST	Ralls 42'; Bennett (yellow card) 56'; Hoilett 88'	Report	Chalobah 50'; Elphick (yellow card) 80'	Stadium: Cardiff City Stadium; Attendance: 21,821; Referee: Jarred Gillett

24 August 2019 5	Huddersfield Town	0–2	Reading	Huddersfield
15:00 BST	Brown (yellow card) 40'	Report	Richards (yellow card) 30'; Ejaria 71'; Morrison 84'	Stadium: John Smith’s Stadium; Attendance: 21,847; Referee: Tony Harrington

31 August 2019 6	Luton Town	2–1	Huddersfield Town	Luton
15:00 BST	Collins 57' (pen.) (yellow card) 88'; Shinnie 66'; Brown (yellow card) 84'	Report	Grant 47'; Chalobah (yellow card) 82'; Diakhaby (yellow card) 88'	Stadium: Kenilworth Road; Attendance: 10,062; Referee: Andy Davies

15 September 2019 7	Huddersfield Town	0–2	Sheffield Wednesday	Huddersfield
12:00 BST	Chalobah (yellow card) 63'; Hadergjonaj (yellow card) 68'	Report	Fletcher 10' (yellow card) 79'; Hutchinson (yellow card) 55'; Börner (yellow card) 70'; Winnall 72'	Stadium: John Smith’s Stadium; Attendance: 22,754; Referee: Simon Hooper
Note: Live on Sky Sports

22 September 2019 8	West Bromwich Albion	4–2	Huddersfield Town	West Bromwich
12:00 BST	Phillips 19', 74'; Furlong 70'; Ajayi 89'	Report	O'Brien 16'; Grant 35'	Stadium: The Hawthorns; Attendance: 23,577; Referee: Tim Robinson
Note: Live on Sky Sports

28 September 2019 9	Huddersfield Town	1–1	Millwall	Huddersfield
15:00 BST	Campbell 24' (yellow card) 81'	Report	Smith 41'; Ferguson (yellow card) 72' (yellow-red card) 80'	Stadium: John Smith’s Stadium; Attendance: 20,781; Referee: Jeremy Simpson

1 October 2019 10	Stoke City	0–1	Huddersfield Town	Stoke-on-Trent
20:00 BST	Clucas (yellow card) 67'	Report	Simpson (yellow card) 65'; Bacuna 82'; Hogg (yellow card) 89'	Stadium: bet365 Stadium; Attendance: 20,372; Referee: Robert Jones

5 October 2019 11	Huddersfield Town	3–0	Hull City	Huddersfield
15:00 BST	Hogg (yellow card) 32'; Brown (yellow card) 63'; Grant 68'; Bacuna 74'; Kachunga 82'; O'Brien (yellow card) 90+1'	Report	Magennis (yellow card) 90+1'	Stadium: John Smith’s Stadium; Attendance: 21,702; Referee: David Webb

19 October 2019 12	Blackburn Rovers	2–2	Huddersfield Town	Blackburn
12:30 BST	Holtby 20'; Dack 33'; Travis (yellow card) 45+1'	Report	Grant 12' (pen.); Bacuna 63'; Hogg (yellow card) 78'; Kachunga (yellow card) 85'; Campbell (yellow card) 85'	Stadium: Ewood Park; Attendance: 13,761; Referee: Darren Bond
Note: Live on Sky Sports

23 October 2019 13	Huddersfield Town	0–0	Middlesbrough	Huddersfield
19:45 BST	Bacuna (yellow card) 90+7'	Report	Fry (yellow card) 17'; McNair (yellow card) 39'; Saville (yellow card) 84'	Stadium: John Smith’s Stadium; Attendance: 22,839; Referee: Tony Harrington
Note: Live on Sky Sports

26 October 2019 14	Huddersfield Town	2–1	Barnsley	Huddersfield
15:00 BST	Schindler 30' (yellow card) 86'; Grant 53'	Report	Brown 79'; Mowatt (yellow card) 90+4'	Stadium: John Smith’s Stadium; Attendance: 22,718; Referee: James Linington

2 November 2019 15	Brentford	0–1	Huddersfield Town	Brentford
15:00 GMT	Nørgaard (yellow card) 59'	Report	Kachunga (yellow card) 55'; Grant 62'; Hogg (yellow card) 64'; Simpson (yellow card) 87'; Diakhaby (yellow card) 89'; Elphick (yellow card) 90+2'	Stadium: Griffin Park; Attendance: 11,727; Referee: Oliver Langford

9 November 2019 16	Preston North End	3–1	Huddersfield Town	Preston
15:00 GMT	Stockley 4' (yellow card) 62'; Ledson (yellow card) 18'; Browne 33'; Fisher (yellow card) 45+5'; Gallagher 50' (pen.); Maguire (yellow card) 86'	Report	Bacuna (yellow card) 45+5' (goal) 74'; O'Brien (yellow card) 62'	Stadium: Deepdale; Attendance: 16,038; Referee: Geoff Eltringham

23 November 2019 17	Huddersfield Town	1–1	Birmingham City	Huddersfield
15:00 GMT	Hogg (yellow card) 10'; Campbell 55'	Report	Clarke-Salter (yellow card) 26'; Roberts 78'	Stadium: John Smith’s Stadium; Attendance: 22,573; Referee: Keith Stroud

26 November 2019 18	Huddersfield Town	1–1	Swansea City	Huddersfield
19:45 GMT	Hogg (yellow card) 12'; Campbell (yellow card) 31'; Grant 41'; Stanković (yellow card) 62'; Chalobah (red card) 86'	Report	Fulton 18'; Byers (yellow card) 66'; Borja (yellow card) 90+3'	Stadium: John Smith’s Stadium; Attendance: 20,062; Referee: Jarred Gillett

30 November 2019 19	Bristol City	5–2	Huddersfield Town	Bristol
15:00 GMT	Brownhill 11'; Kongolo 30' (o.g.); Eliasson 36'; Williams 40'; Weimann 49'	Report	Grant 35'; Bacuna 57'; O'Brien (yellow card) 86'	Stadium: Ashton Gate; Attendance: 20,762; Referee: Darren England

7 December 2019 20	Huddersfield Town	0–2	Leeds United	Huddersfield
12:30 GMT	Bacuna (yellow card) 59'; Hogg (yellow card) 69'	Report	Klich (yellow card) 45+1'; Dallas (yellow card) 45+3'; Alioski 50'; Hernández 78'; White (yellow card) 80'	Stadium: John Smith’s Stadium; Attendance: 23,805; Referee: Gavin Ward

10 December 2019 21	Charlton Athletic	0–1	Huddersfield Town	Charlton
19:55 GMT	Gallagher (yellow card) 31'; Bonne (yellow card) 46'; Lockyer (yellow card) 87'	Report	Stanković (yellow card) 27'; Kachunga (yellow card) 36'; Daly 90+2'	Stadium: The Valley; Attendance: 13,488; Referee: Graham Scott

14 December 2019 22	Wigan Athletic	1–1	Huddersfield Town	Wigan
15:00 GMT	Windass 43'; Evans (yellow card) 67'	Report	Hadergjonaj (yellow card) 65'; Grant 70'; Chalobah (yellow card) 85'	Stadium: DW Stadium; Attendance: 10,383; Referee: Stephen Martin

21 December 2019 23	Huddersfield Town	2–1	Nottingham Forest	Huddersfield
15:00 GMT	Schindler 32'; Mounié 49'; Chalobah (yellow card) 63'; Hogg (yellow card) 69'; Grabara (yellow card) 80'	Report	Sow (yellow card) 39'; Figueiredo (yellow card) 57'; Watson (yellow card) 66'; Worrall 74'	Stadium: John Smith’s Stadium; Attendance: 22,529; Referee: Andy Davies

26 December 2019 24	Middlesbrough	1–0	Huddersfield Town	Middlesbrough
15:00 GMT	Spence 37'; Howson (yellow card) 43'; Fletcher (yellow card) 64'; Saville (yellow card) 88'	Report	Bacuna (yellow card) 43'; Grabara (yellow card) 77'; O'Brien (yellow card) 82'; Grant (yellow card) 90'	Stadium: Riverside Stadium; Attendance: 25,313; Referee: Darren England

29 December 2019 25	Huddersfield Town	2–1	Blackburn Rovers	Huddersfield
15:00	Stanković 25'; Mounié 71'; Hadergjonaj (yellow card) 76'; Campbell (yellow card) 79'	Report	Graham 7'; Bennett (yellow card) 90+7'	Stadium: John Smith’s Stadium; Attendance: 22,859; Referee: Andy Woolmer

1 January 2020 26	Huddersfield Town	2–5	Stoke City	Huddersfield
15:00 GMT	Hogg (yellow card) 23'; Mounié 48'; Batth 50' (o.g.); Grant (yellow card) 55'; Simpson (yellow card) 57'; O'Brien (yellow card) 65'; Campbell (yellow card) 82'	Report	Vokes 15'; Lindsay (yellow card) 27'; Powell 57'; Campbell 66', 70'; Smith (yellow card) 80'; Gregory 90'	Stadium: John Smith’s Stadium; Attendance: 21,933; Referee: James Linington

11 January 2020 27	Barnsley	2–1	Huddersfield Town	Barnsley
15:00 GMT	Mowatt 14'; Chaplin 65'; Thomas (yellow card) 68'; Diaby (yellow card) 73'	Report	Simpson (yellow card) 53'; O'Brien 66'; Chalobah (yellow card) 69'; Bacuna (yellow card) 78'; Hadergjonaj (yellow card) 90+1'; Campbell (yellow card) 90+2'	Stadium: Oakwell; Attendance: 17,158; Referee: Simon Hooper

18 January 2020 28	Huddersfield Town	0–0	Brentford	Huddersfield
15:00 GMT	Schindler (yellow card) 87'	Report		Stadium: John Smith’s Stadium; Attendance: 20,874; Referee: Oliver Langford

28 January 2020 29	Hull City	1–2	Huddersfield Town	Kingston upon Hull
19:45 GMT	Stearman 66' (o.g.)	Report	Grant 24'; Grabara (yellow card) 66'; Mounié 90+6'	Stadium: KCOM Stadium; Attendance: 10,474; Referee: Stephen Martin

1 February 2020 30	Fulham	3–2	Huddersfield Town	Fulham
15:00 GMT	Decordova-Reid 10'; Cairney 15'; Mitrović 31'; McDonald (yellow card) 48'; Christie (yellow card) 82'; Rodák (yellow card) 90+1'; Johansen (yellow card) 90+3'	Report	Smith Rowe 35'; O'Brien (yellow card) 38'; Mounié 39'	Stadium: Craven Cottage; Attendance: 18,013; Referee: Gavin Ward

8 February 2020 31	Huddersfield Town	2–0	Queens Park Rangers	Huddersfield
15:00 GMT	Kachunga 57'; Mounié 61' (pen.)	Report	Hugill (yellow card) 27'; Amos (yellow card) 41'; Ball (yellow card) 82'	Stadium: John Smith’s Stadium; Attendance: 21,083; Referee: David Webb

12 February 2020 32	Huddersfield Town	0–3	Cardiff City	Huddersfield
19:45 GMT	Stearman (yellow card) 44'	Report	Nelson (yellow card) 18'; Murphy 28'; Vaulks 33' (yellow card) 66'; Paterson 69'	Stadium: John Smith’s Stadium; Attendance: 20,238; Referee: Darren England

15 February 2020 33	Derby County	1–1	Huddersfield Town	Derby
15:00 GMT	Shinnie (yellow card) 38'; Martin (yellow card) 45+1'; Lawrence 61'; Davies (yellow card) 90'	Report	Toffolo 81'	Stadium: Pride Park Stadium; Attendance: 27,502; Referee: Craig Pawson

22 February 2020 34	Swansea City	3–1	Huddersfield Town	Swansea
15:00 GMT	Ayew 28'; Fulton (yellow card) 49' (goal) 80'; Garrick 90'	Report	Hogg (yellow card) 45+2'; Mounié 78'	Stadium: Liberty Stadium; Attendance: 15,148; Referee: Andy Davies

25 February 2020 35	Huddersfield Town	2–1	Bristol City	Huddersfield
19:45 GMT	Toffolo (yellow card) 18'; Willock 39'; Grant 63' (pen.); O'Brien (yellow card) 70'	Report	Benković (yellow card) 11'; Hunt (yellow card) 17'; Kalas (yellow card) 45'; Diédhiou 88'; Weimann (yellow card) 89'	Stadium: John Smith’s Stadium; Attendance: 19,703; Referee: Robert Jones

29 February 2020 36	Huddersfield Town	4–0	Charlton Athletic	Huddersfield
15:00 GMT	Grant 25', 90'; Mounié 75'; Chalobah (yellow card) 88'; Bacuna 90+4'	Report	Lapslie (yellow card) 82'; Hemed (yellow card) 86'	Stadium: John Smith’s Stadium; Attendance: 21,539; Referee: Geoff Eltringham

7 March 2020 37	Leeds United	2–0	Huddersfield Town	Leeds
15:00 GMT	Ayling 3' (yellow card) 19'; Berardi (yellow card) 38'; Bamford 51'; White (yellow card) 80'	Report	Stearman (yellow card) 15'; Willock (yellow card) 35'; Schindler (yellow card) 51'	Stadium: Elland Road; Attendance: 36,514; Referee: Oliver Langford

20 June 2020 38	Huddersfield Town	0–2	Wigan Athletic	Huddersfield
15:00 BST	Smith Rowe (yellow card) 34'; O'Brien (yellow card) 45'	Report	Lowe 26'; Pilkington 48'; Morsy (yellow card) 82'	Stadium: John Smith's Stadium; Attendance: 0 (Played behind closed doors); Referee: Jarred Gillett
Note: Season was suspended until 3 April 2020, due to the COVID-19 pandemic. The match was rescheduled to 20 June.

28 June 2020 39	Nottingham Forest	3–1	Huddersfield Town	West Bridgford
14:15 BST	Grabban 43', 46'; Watson (yellow card) 44'; Ameobi (yellow card) 62'; Yates 85'; Da Costa (yellow card) 90'	Report	Bacuna (red card) 89'; Grant 90+6' (pen.)	Stadium: City Ground; Attendance: 0 (Played behind closed doors); Referee: David Webb
Note: Season was suspended until 3 April 2020, due to the COVID-19 pandemic. The match was rescheduled to 28 Jun, and shown live on Sky Sports

1 July 2020 40	Birmingham City	0–3	Huddersfield Town	Bordesley
18:00 BST		Report	Grant 10' (pen.) (penalty missed) 50'; Campbell 51'; O'Brien (yellow card) 66'; Kachunga 72'	Stadium: St Andrew's Trillion Trophy Stadium; Attendance: 0 (Played behind closed doors); Referee: Robert Jones
Note: Season was suspended until 3 April 2020, due to the COVID-19 pandemic. The match was rescheduled to 1 July.

4 July 2020 41	Huddersfield Town	0–0	Preston North End	Huddersfield
15:00 BST		Report		Stadium: John Smith's Stadium; Attendance: 0 (Played behind closed doors); Referee: Darren Bond
Note: On 3 April, the English Football League decided to postpone all football until safe to do so due to the COVID-19 pandemic. The match was rescheduled to 4 July.

7 July 2020 42	Reading	0–0	Huddersfield Town	Reading
18:00 BST	Méïté (yellow card) 20'; Pelé (yellow card) 67'	Report	Toffolo (yellow card) 39'; Stanković (yellow card) 50'	Stadium: Madejski Stadium; Attendance: 0 (Played behind closed doors); Referee: Steve Martin
Note: On 3 April, the English Football League decided to postpone all football until safe to do so due to the COVID-19 pandemic. The match was rescheduled to 7 July.

10 July 2020 43	Huddersfield Town	0–2	Luton Town	Huddersfield
18:00 BST	Campbell (yellow card) 38'; Bacuna (yellow card) 85'	Report	Bradley 49'; Lee 71'; Shinnie (yellow card) 90+3'	Stadium: John Smith’s Stadium; Attendance: 0 (Played behind closed doors); Referee: Geoff Eltringham
Note: On 3 April, the English Football League decided to postpone all football until safe to do so due to the COVID-19 pandemic. The match was rescheduled to 10 July, and shown live on Sky Sports

14 July 2020 44	Sheffield Wednesday	0–0	Huddersfield Town	Sheffield
19:45 BST	Pelupessy (yellow card) 90+1'	Report	Hogg (yellow card) 72'	Stadium: Hillsborough Stadium; Attendance: 0 (Played behind closed doors); Referee: Dean Whitestone
Note: On 3 April, the English Football League decided to postpone all football until safe to do so due to the COVID-19 pandemic. The match was rescheduled to 14 July.

17 July 2020 45	Huddersfield Town	2–1	West Bromwich Albion	Huddersfield
17:30 BST	Willock 4', (yellow card) 23'; Chalobah (yellow card) 19'; Campbell (yellow card) 60'; Lössl (yellow card) 85'; Smith Rowe 86'	Report	Phillips (yellow card) 30'; Robson-Kanu (yellow card) 38'; O'Shea 42'; Townsend (yellow card) 53'; Krovinović (yellow card) 81'; Furlong (yellow card) 88'; Austin (yellow card) 90+1'	Stadium: John Smith’s Stadium; Attendance: 0 (Played behind closed doors); Referee: John Brooks
Note: On 3 April, the English Football League decided to postpone all football until safe to do so due to the COVID-19 pandemic. The match was rescheduled to 17 July, and shown live on Sky Sports

22 July 2020 46	Millwall	4–1	Huddersfield Town	Bermondsey
19:30 BST	Mahoney 4'; Thompson (yellow card) 40'; Cooper 47'; Skalák 63'; Böðvarsson 79'	Report	Grant 36'	Stadium: The Den; Attendance: 0 (Played behind closed doors); Referee: Keith Stroud
Note: On 3 April, the English Football League decided to postpone all football until safe to do so due to the COVID-19 pandemic. The match was rescheduled to 22 July.

=== FA Cup ===
The third round draw was made live on BBC Two from Etihad Stadium, Micah Richards and Tony Adams conducted the draw.

4 January 2020 Third round	Southampton	2–0	Huddersfield Town	Southampton
15:01 GMT	Long (yellow card) 42'; Smallbone 47'; Vokins 87'	Report		Stadium: St Mary's Stadium; Attendance: 20,091; Referee: Tim Robinson

=== EFL Cup ===
The first round draw was made on 20 June.

13 August 2019 First round	Huddersfield Town	0–1	Lincoln City	Huddersfield
19:45 BST	Bacuna (yellow card) 87'	Report	Anderson 55' (yellow card) 79'; Bolger (yellow card) 83'	Stadium: John Smith's Stadium; Attendance: 6,908; Referee: Peter Wright

== Squad statistics ==
No.	Pos.	Name	League		FA Cup		EFL Cup		Total		Discipline	
No.	Pos.	Name	Apps	Goals	Apps	Goals	Apps	Goals	Apps	Goals	Yellow card	Red card
1	GK	(Poland) Kamil Grabara	28	0	0	0	0	0	28	0	3	0
3	DF	(England) Harry Toffolo	19	1	0	0	0	0	19	1	2	0
4	DF	(England) Tommy Elphick	14	0	0	0	0	0	14	0	2	0
5	DF	(Netherlands) Terence Kongolo	10+1	0	0	0	0	0	10+1	0	0	0
6	MF	(England) Jonathan Hogg	37	0	1	0	0	0	38	0	12	0
7	MF	(Curaçao) Juninho Bacuna	25+13	6	1	0	1	0	25+13	6	8	1
8	MF	(England) Trevoh Chalobah	30+6	1	1	0	1	0	32+6	1	7	1
9	FW	(Democratic Republic of the Congo) Elias Kachunga	30+6	3	0	0	1	0	31+6	3	4	0
10	FW	(England) Chris Willock	8+6	2	0	0	0	0	8+6	2	2	0
11	FW	(France) Adama Diakhaby	9+9	0	0	0	0	0	9+9	0	3	0
12	DF	(England) Richard Stearman	17	0	0	0	0	0	17	0	2	0
13	GK	(England) Joel Coleman	2+1	0	1	0	0	0	3+1	0	0	0
14	DF	(Uganda) Herbert Bockhorn	0	0	0	0	1	0	1	0	0	0
16	FW	(England) Karlan Grant	42+1	19	0+1	0	0	0	42+2	19	3	0
17	DF	(England) Danny Simpson	23+1	0	1	0	0	0	24+1	0	3	0
18	FW	(Belgium) Isaac Mbenza	1+4	0	0	0	1	0	2+4	0	0	0
19	FW	(England) Josh Koroma	3+4	0	0+1	0	1	0	4+5	0	0	0
20	MF	(England) Reece Brown	0	0	0	0	1	0	1	0	0	0
21	MF	(England) Alex Pritchard	10+8	0	0	0	0	0	10+8	0	0	0
22	FW	(England) Fraizer Campbell	21+12	3	1	0	0	0	22+12	3	8	0
23	FW	(Germany) Collin Quaner	0+5	0	0	0	0	0	0+5	0	1	0
24	FW	(Benin) Steve Mounié	12+18	8	0+1	0	0+1	0	12+20	8	0	0
25	FW	(England) Rekeil Pyke	0+1	0	0	0	0	0	0+1	0	0	0
26	DF	(Germany) Christopher Schindler	45	2	1	0	0	0	46	2	3	0
27	DF	(Slovenia) Jon Gorenc Stanković	13+6	1	1	0	1	0	15+6	1	2	0
28	DF	(England) Jaden Brown	12+3	0	1	0	1	0	14+3	0	3	0
29	MF	(Wales) Andy King	6+8	0	0	0	0	0	6+8	0	0	0
31	GK	(England) Ryan Schofield	1	0	0	0	1	0	2	0	0	0
32	MF	(England) Emile Smith Rowe	13+6	2	0	0	0	0	13+6	2	1	0
33	DF	(Kosovo) Florent Hadergjonaj	14+7	0	1	0	0	0	15+7	0	4	0
35	DF	(England) Rarmani Edmonds-Green	1+1	0	0	0	1	0	2+1	0	0	0
36	FW	(England) Micah Obiero	0+1	0	0	0	0	0	0+1	0	0	0
37	FW	(England) Kian Harratt	0+1	0	0	0	0	0	0+1	0	0	0
38	DF	(England) Demeaco Duhaney	4+2	0	0	0	0	0	4+2	0	0	0
39	MF	(England) Lewis O'Brien	36+2	1	1	0	0	0	37+2	1	10	0
41	MF	(England) Matty Daly	0+4	1	0	0	0	0	0+4	1	0	0
43	MF	(England) Scott High	0+1	0	0	0	0	0	0+1	0	0	0
44	MF	(England) Aaron Rowe	1	0	0	0	0	0	1	0	0	0
49	GK	(Denmark) Jonas Lössl	15	0	0	0	0	0	15	0	1	0
—	—	Own goals	–	1	–	0	–	0	–	1	–	–
Players who left the club during the season:
10	MF	(Australia) Aaron Mooy	1	0	0	0	0	0	1	0	0	0
17	MF	(Netherlands) Rajiv van La Parra	3+1	0	0	0	0+1	0	3+2	0	0	0

== Awards ==
=== Huddersfield Town Blue & White Foundation Player of the Month Award ===
Awarded monthly to the player that was chosen by members of the Blue & White Foundation voting on htafc.com

Month	Player	Votes
August	(England) Karlan Grant	
September	(England) Lewis O'Brien	
October	(England) Lewis O'Brien	
November	(England) Karlan Grant	
December	(Slovenia) Jon Gorenc Stanković	
January	(Benin) Steve Mounié	
February	(England) Harry Toffolo	
