= Harry Toffolo =

English footballer (born 1995)

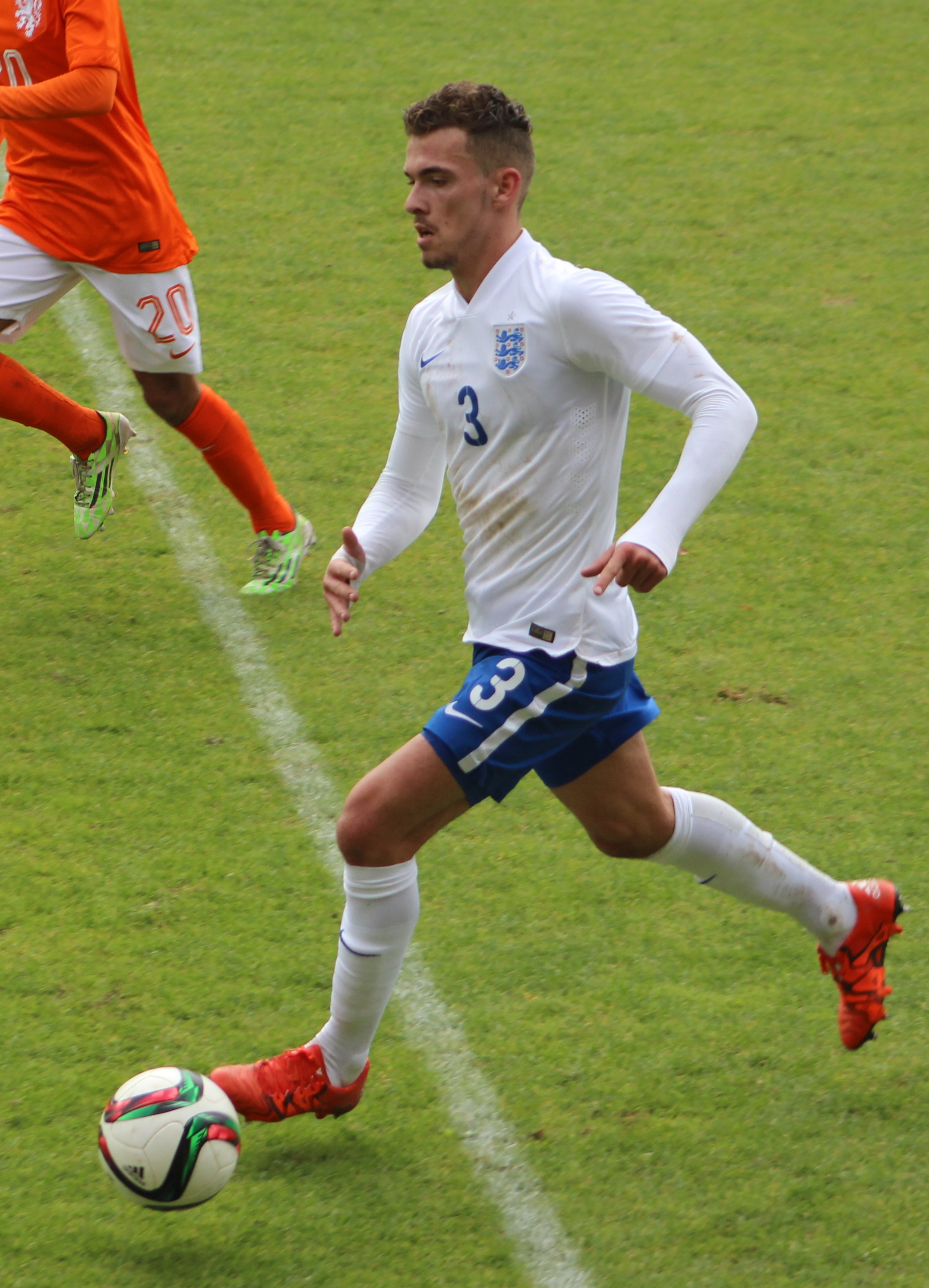
- Toffolo playing for England U20 in 2015

Personal information
- Full name: Harry Stefano Toffolo
- Date of birth: 19 August 1995 (age 31)
- Place of birth: Welwyn Garden City, England
- Height: 6 ft 0 in (1.83 m)
- Position: Left-back

Team information
- Current team: Charlotte FC
- Number: 15

Youth career
- 2008–2014: Norwich City

Senior career*
Years	Team	Apps	(Gls)
2014–2018	Norwich City	0	(0)
2014–2015	→ Swindon Town (loan)	28	(1)
2015–2016	→ Rotherham United (loan)	7	(0)
2016	→ Peterborough United (loan)	7	(0)
2016–2017	→ Scunthorpe United (loan)	22	(2)
2017–2018	→ Doncaster Rovers (loan)	13	(0)
2018	Millwall	0	(0)
2018–2020	Lincoln City	72	(4)
2020–2022	Huddersfield Town	92	(9)
2022–2025	Nottingham Forest	46	(1)
2025–	Charlotte FC	25	(1)

International career
2013	England U18	1	(0)
2013	England U19	3	(0)
2015–2016	England U20	6	(0)
- * Club domestic league appearances and goals as of 20:39, 15 November 2026 (UTC)

Harry Stefano Toffolo (born 19 August 1995) is an English professional footballer who plays as a left-back for Major League Soccer club Charlotte FC.

== Career ==
=== Norwich City ===
Toffolo was born in Welwyn Garden City, Hertfordshire, and grew up in Watton-at-Stone where he supported Chelsea. He joined Norwich City in 2008 as an under-14 player. Three years after joining the club, Toffolo joined the Academy in March 2011. Later that year, he earned his first scholarships with the club.

In 2013, Toffolo played for them in the 2013 FA Youth Cup, as Norwich beat Chelsea 4–2 on aggregate in the final. During the tournament, he scored twice in the last 16 of the FA Youth Cup, in a 2–1 win over Millwall's Under-18 on 31 January 2013. After this, Toffolo signed his first professional contract with the club.

In the 2014–15 season, Toffolo was an unused substitute in the League Cup for Norwich City against Crawley Town in the Second round on 26 August 2014. and Shrewsbury Town in the Third round on 23 September.

After his loan spell at Swindon Town ended, Toffolo had his contract activated after Norwich City opted to take up their option of a contract extension to ensure his stay for the 2015–16 season. Following this, he said that he was determined to stay at the club to fight for his first team place there. He was then featured in the club's pre–season tour in number of matches. On 25 August 2015, he made his first-team debut for Norwich, playing the full 90 minutes, in the League Cup second round 2–1 victory away to Rotherham United, aged 20 years and 6 days. After the match, his performance was praised by Manager Alex Neil. Soon after, Toffolo signed a two–year contract extension with the club.

He started the 2016–17 season, appearing in a 6–1 win over Peterborough United on 30 August 2016, assisting two times in the EFL Trophy. After his loan spell at Scunthorpe United finished at the end of the 2016–17 season, Toffolo had his contract activated after Norwich City opted to take up their option of a contract extension to ensure his stay for the 2017–18 season.

=== Loan spells ===
==== Swindon Town (loan) ====
On 20 October 2014, Toffolo joined Swindon Town on loan for one month. He made his debut as a substitute in the 2–2 draw at home to Colchester United, and his first start in the 1–0 win at Home to Preston North End on 4 November. Toffolo quickly established himself in the first team playing in the left-wing back position. As a result, Toffolo's loan spell was extended until the end of the season.

After returning to the first team for a match against Walsall as a substitute on 26 December, Toffolo then regained his first team place at the club since coming back from injury to help the side challenge their hopes for promotion. He scored his first league goal in a 3–0 win at home against Notts County on 7 March 2015. After missing out in both legs of the play–offs, he made his return in the play-offs final against Preston North End, where he started, in a 4–0 defeat. Toffolo made a total of 30 appearances and scoring once in all competitions, and provided several assists.

During his time at the club, Toffolo established himself as a fans favourite at Swindon and this resulted in the Swindon Town Supporters Trust deciding to fund his loan in January 2015. He also hit the headlines for his engagement with the local community in Swindon, and was involved in a number of charitable events and school visits over and above the usual club player appearance commitments. He is also an Ambassador for Dementia UK (his grandfather having suffered from the condition).

==== Rotherham United (loan) ====
On 19 October 2015, he joined Championship side Rotherham United on a one-month loan. He made his Championship debut the next day in a home game against Reading which finished 1–1. On 23 November, his loan was extended to January 2016. He appeared in every match since joining the club on loan, establishing himself in the left–back position. However, he suffered a virus and it kept him out for a month before returning to his parent club in January 2016. By the time of his departure, he made seven appearances for the side.

==== Peterborough United (loan) ====
On 21 January 2016, Toffolo joined League One side Peterborough United on loan until the end of the season. Toffolo made his debut two days after signing, starting the whole game in a 2–1 loss against Gillingham.

==== Scunthorpe United (loan) ====
On the last day of the transfer window, he was loaned to Scunthorpe United for the rest of the season. The loan deal would kept him until January. Toffolo made his debut coming on as a late substitute in a 4–0 win over Southend United. Since making his debut, he started for the next seven matches in the left–back position. Toffolo scored his first goal in a 3–2 win over Bury on 7 January 2017. Scunthorpe extended his loan spell until the end of the season the following day. He was then sent–off for a second bookable offence in a 1–1 draw against Sheffield United on 18 February. Towards the end of the season, Toffolo lost his first team place after an injury. Throughout the season, Toffolo made 22 appearances and scored twice in all competitions.

==== Doncaster Rovers (loan) ====
Despite suffering from a muscle strain whilst on Norwich City's pre–season tour, Toffolo joined Doncaster Rovers of League One on loan from 31 August 2017 until 3 January 2018. Toffolo made his first appearance in a 1–0 defeat at Northampton Town, being subbed at half time by James Coppinger as Doncaster had fallen behind and changed formation. However, he started out on the substitute bench, due to fitness concerns as well as, competition from Danny Andrew and Craig Alcock for the left–back position. Soon afterwards, he established himself in the starting eleven.

=== Millwall ===
On 29 January 2018, Toffolo signed for Championship club Millwall on a deal until the end of the season. He was released by Millwall at the end of the 2017–18 season without playing a game.

=== Lincoln City ===
On 12 June 2018, Toffolo signed for League Two club Lincoln City on a two-year deal. He played every one of Lincoln's 46 games that season and won a place in the PFA League Two team of the year.

=== Huddersfield Town ===
On 17 January 2020, Toffolo signed a two-and-a-half-year contract with Huddersfield Town for an undisclosed fee. He made his debut the next day in the 0–0 draw against Brentford.

=== Nottingham Forest ===
Following Town's defeat in the 2022 EFL Championship play-off final, Toffolo, along with his teammate Lewis O'Brien, moved to Premier League side Nottingham Forest, who defeated Town in the aforementioned final.

Toffolo scored his first Nottingham Forest and top-flight goal on 9 December 2023 against Wolverhampton Wanderers.

On 1 January 2024, Forest announced that they had exercised a one-year extension option in Toffolo's contract to keep him at the City Ground until the summer of 2025. In June 2025 it was announced that Nottingham Forest had released Toffolo.

== International career ==
Born in Welwyn Garden City, England, Toffolo is eligible to play for England and Italy through his father's family.

In late–February 2013, Toffolo was called up by England U18 side for the first time. He made his debut starting for England U18s in a friendly against Belgium U18 on 15 March 2013 at the age of 17 years, 6 months and 14 days, in which they lost 1–0. This turns out to be his only appearance for England U18.

Later in 2013, Toffolo was called up by U19 side for the first time. On 5 September 2013, he made his debut for the England U19s in a friendly against Estonia U19, where they won 6–1. He then went on to play in a UEFA Qualifying Tournament in Slovenia, playing in the matches against Slovenia U19 and Switzerland U19, as England finished as group winners.

In March 2015, Toffolo was called up for the England U20 squad for the first time. His U20 debut was in a friendly against the United States on 29 March 2015, at Home Park, which England won 2–1. Harry was selected as part of the 23 man squad to play in the Mercedes Benz Cup Tournament in October 2015. He played the full 90 minutes of the 3–1 victory against the Netherlands and came off the bench on 63 minutes and assisted the winning goal in the 2–1 victory against Turkey. He again played the full 90 minutes in the final game, a 1–0 defeat against the hosts, Germany.

== Personal life ==
In August 2016, his girlfriend Annie Bell gave birth to the couple's first child, a boy named Luca Stefano.

Toffolo said about his position, quoting: "I love getting forward", he said. "I'm generally a left-back but I like to get forward a lot so the left wing-back role suits me as well. You have to get back and do your job there but I love getting forward and doing as much as I can."

In July 2023, Toffolo was charged by the Football Association for breaching its betting rules an alleged 375 times between 22 January 2014 and 18 March 2017. On 13 September 2023 it was announced Toffolo had been given a five-month ban by the Football Association after admitting to the 375 breaches of betting rules. His ban was suspended until the end of 2024–25 and he was also fined £20,956.

== Career statistics ==
As of match played 27 April 2025

Appearances and goals by club, season and competition
Club	Season	League			FA Cup		League Cup		Other		Total	
Club	Season	Division	Apps	Goals	Apps	Goals	Apps	Goals	Apps	Goals	Apps	Goals
Norwich City	2014–15	Championship	0	0	—		0	0	0	0	0	0
Norwich City	2015–16	Premier League	0	0	0	0	1	0	—		1	0
Norwich City	2016–17	Championship	0	0	0	0	1	0	1 (Note: Appearance in the Football League Trophy with Norwich City U23s)	0	2	0
Norwich City	2017–18	Championship	0	0	0	0	0	0	0	0	0	0
Norwich City	Total		0	0	0	0	2	0	1	0	3	0
Swindon Town (loan)	2014–15	League One	28	1	1	0	—		1 (Note: Appearances in League One play-offs)	0	30	1
Rotherham United (loan)	2015–16	Championship	7	0	—		—		—		7	0
Peterborough United (loan)	2015–16	League One	7	0	—		—		—		7	0
Scunthorpe United (loan)	2016–17	League One	22	2	0	0	—		0	0	22	2
Doncaster Rovers (loan)	2017–18	League One	13	0	2	0	0	0	2 (Note: Appearances in the EFL Trophy)	0	17	0
Millwall	2017–18	Championship	0	0	0	0	0	0	0	0	0	0
Lincoln City	2018–19	League Two	46	3	3	0	1	0	2	0	52	3
Lincoln City	2019–20	League One	26	1	2	0	2	0	3	0	33	1
Lincoln City	Total		72	4	5	0	3	0	5	0	85	4
Huddersfield Town	2019–20	Championship	19	1	—		—		—		19	1
Huddersfield Town	2020–21	Championship	31	2	0	0	1	0	—		32	2
Huddersfield Town	2021–22	Championship	42	6	1	0	2	0	—		45	6
Huddersfield Town	Total		92	9	1	0	3	0	—		96	9
Nottingham Forest	2022–23	Premier League	19	0	1	0	1	0	—		21	0
Nottingham Forest	2023–24	Premier League	23	1	5	0	1	0	—		29	1
Nottingham Forest	2024–25	Premier League	4	0	3	0	0	0	—		7	0
Nottingham Forest	Total		46	1	9	0	2	0	—		57	1
Career total			287	17	18	0	10	0	9	0	324	17

== Honours ==
Lincoln City

- EFL League Two: 2018–19

Individual

- PFA Team of the Year: 2018-19 League Two
