= Joel Coleman =

English footballer (born 1995)

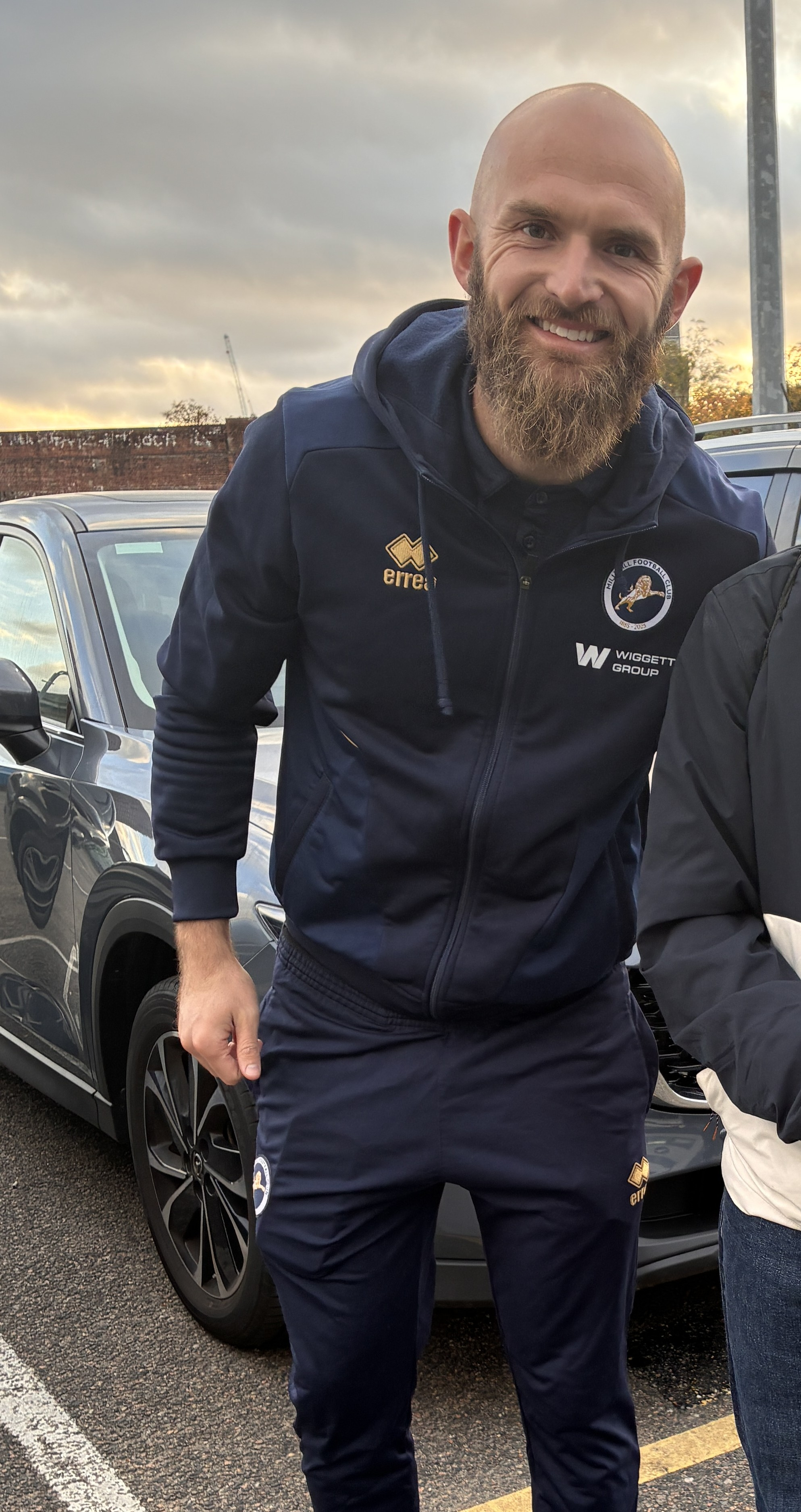
- Joel Coleman in 2025.

Personal information
- Full name: Joel Coleman
- Date of birth: 26 September 1995 (age 31)
- Place of birth: Bolton, England
- Height: 6 ft 6 in (1.98 m)
- Position: Goalkeeper

Team information
- Current team: Millwall
- Number: 43

Youth career
- 2006–2013: Oldham Athletic

Senior career*
Years	Team	Apps	(Gls)
2013–2016	Oldham Athletic	43	(0)
2016–2020	Huddersfield Town	9	(0)
2018–2019	→ Shrewsbury Town (loan)	16	(0)
2020–2021	Fleetwood Town	0	(0)
2021–2022	Rochdale	12	(0)
2022–2023	Ipswich Town	0	(0)
2023–2025	Bolton Wanderers	13	(0)
2025–	Millwall	0	(0)
- * Club domestic league appearances and goals as of 14:43, 28 August 2025 (UTC)

Joel Coleman (born 26 September 1995) is an English professional footballer who plays as a goalkeeper for EFL Championship club Millwall.

== Career ==
=== Oldham Athletic ===
Coleman was born in Bolton, Greater Manchester. An Oldham Athletic youth graduate having joined when he was 11, he signed a two-year scholarship with the club in 2012. He signed his first professional contract with the club on 18 June 2014, penning a two-year contract.

Coleman made his first-team debut on 17 March 2015, coming on as a 57th-minute substitute for Jake Kean in a 3–1 League One home loss against Milton Keynes Dons.

=== Huddersfield Town ===
Coleman signed for Championship club Huddersfield Town on 7 June 2016 on a three-year contract for an undisclosed fee. He made his debut on 26 December 2016, playing the entirety of a 2–1 win at home to Nottingham Forest.

He replaced the suspended Danny Ward for the first leg of the Championship play-off semi-final against Sheffield Wednesday, keeping a clean sheet in the process. Following Huddersfield Town's promotion to the Premier League, Coleman signed a new two-year contract with the club on 30 July 2017.

==== Shrewsbury Town (loan) ====
Coleman joined League One club Shrewsbury Town on 27 July 2018 on loan for the 2018–19 season, after signing a new two-year contract at Huddersfield with the option of a further year.

=== Fleetwood Town ===
On 20 August 2020, Coleman joined League One club Fleetwood Town on a two-year deal.

On 6 August 2021, Coleman left Fleetwood Town by mutual consent.

=== Rochdale ===
On 6 August 2021, Coleman signed a one-year contract with Rochdale. He was released by the club in May 2022.

=== Ipswich Town ===
On 4 November 2022, Coleman signed a short-term deal for Ipswich Town following the injury to third-choice goalkeeper Nick Hayes.

=== Bolton Wanderers ===
On 20 June 2023, Bolton Wanderers confirmed that Coleman would be joining them on a two-year deal on the expiry of his Ipswich Town contract on 1 July. Having been born in Bolton, he described joining his home town club as a dream come true. On 7 May 2025, the club confirmed that Coleman would leave at the end of his contract.

=== Millwall ===
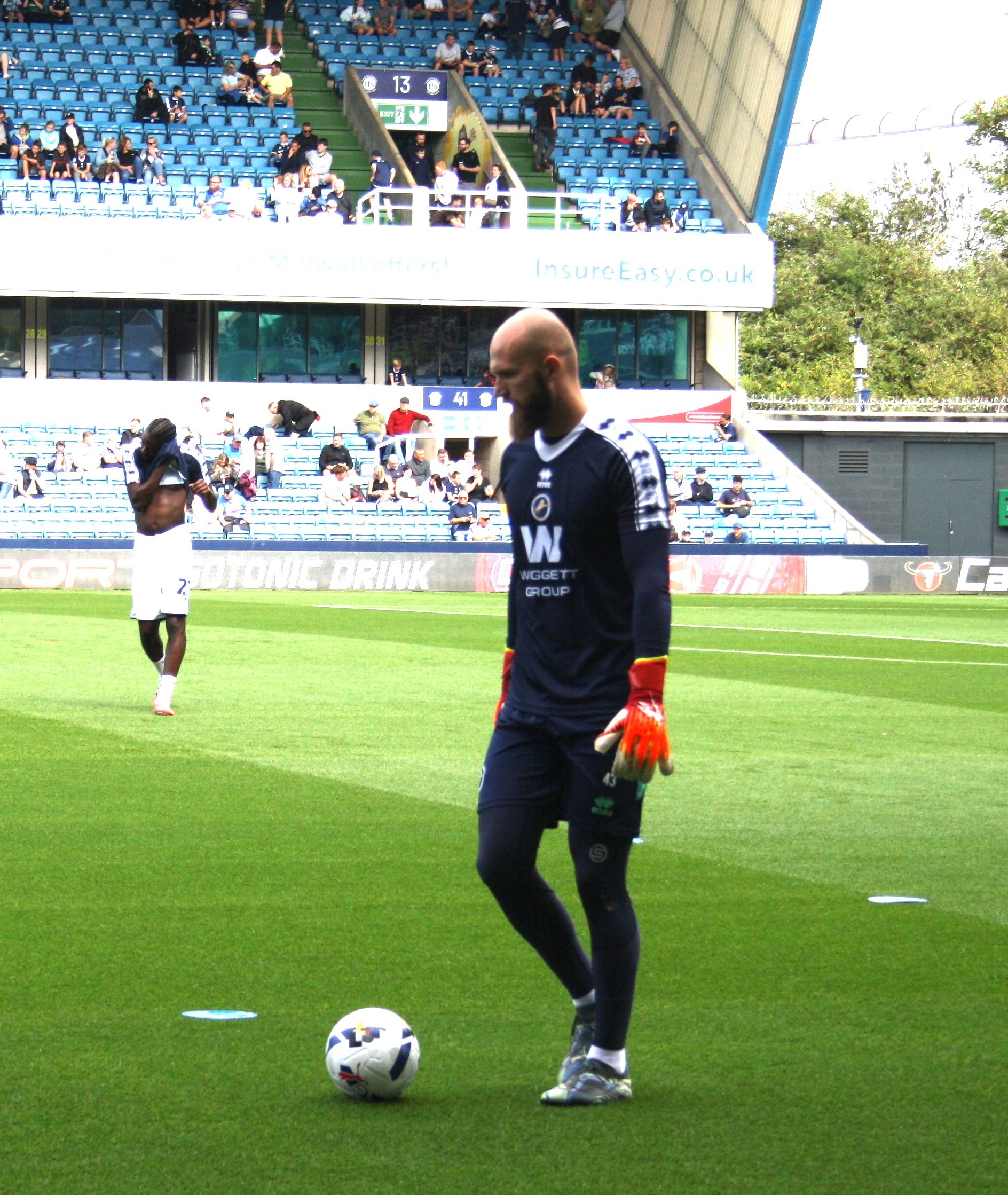
Coleman training for Millwall‘s match against Wrexham.

On 26 August 2025, it was confirmed that Coleman had signed a one-year deal with Millwall.

== Career statistics ==
As of match played 1 April 2024

Appearances and goals by club, season and competition
Club	Season	League			FA Cup		EFL Cup		Other		Total	
Club	Season	Division	Apps	Goals	Apps	Goals	Apps	Goals	Apps	Goals	Apps	Goals
Oldham Athletic	2013–14	League One	0	0	0	0	0	0	0	0	0	0
Oldham Athletic	2014–15	League One	11	0	0	0	0	0	0	0	11	0
Oldham Athletic	2015–16	League One	32	0	2	0	0	0	0	0	34	0
Oldham Athletic	Total		43	0	2	0	0	0	0	0	45	0
Huddersfield Town	2016–17	Championship	5	0	4	0	0	0	1 (Note: Appearance in Championship play-offs)	0	10	0
Huddersfield Town	2017–18	Premier League	0	0	2	0	2	0	—		4	0
Huddersfield Town	2018–19	Premier League	1	0	—		—		—		1	0
Huddersfield Town	2019–20	Championship	3	0	1	0	0	0	—		4	0
Huddersfield Town	Total		9	0	7	0	2	0	1	0	19	0
Shrewsbury Town (loan)	2018–19	League One	16	0	0	0	1	0	0	0	17	0
Fleetwood Town	2020–21	League One	0	0	0	0	1	0	1 (Note: Appearance in EFL Trophy)	0	2	0
Rochdale	2021–22	League Two	20	0	0	0	1	0	1	0	21	0
Ipswich Town	2022–23	League One	0	0	0	0	0	0	0	0	0	0
Bolton Wanderers	2023–24	League One	13	0	0	0	2	0	4	0	19	0
Career total			101	0	9	0	7	0	7	0	123	0

== Honours ==
Huddersfield Town

- EFL Championship play-offs: 2017
