= Collin Quaner =

German footballer

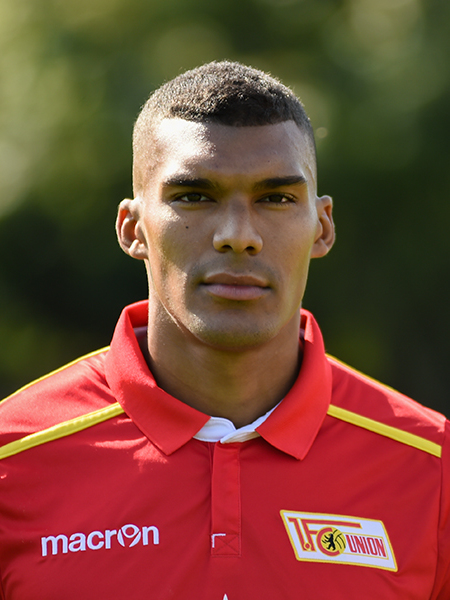
- Quaner with Union Berlin in 2016

Personal information
- Full name: Collin Quaner
- Date of birth: 18 June 1991 (age 35)
- Place of birth: Düsseldorf, Germany
- Height: 1.91 m (6 ft 3 in)
- Position: Forward

Youth career
- Fortuna Düsseldorf

Senior career*
Years	Team	Apps	(Gls)
2009–2010	Fortuna Düsseldorf II	1	(0)
2010–2011	Arminia Bielefeld II	8	(1)
2010–2011	Arminia Bielefeld	18	(1)
2011–2014	FC Ingolstadt II	14	(3)
2011–2014	FC Ingolstadt	26	(2)
2012–2013	→ Hansa Rostock (loan)	7	(0)
2014–2015	VfR Aalen	27	(6)
2015–2017	Union Berlin	29	(8)
2017–2020	Huddersfield Town	49	(2)
2018–2019	→ Ipswich Town (loan)	16	(4)
2021	St Mirren	6	(1)
2021	Austria Klagenfurt	0	(0)
Total		201	(28)

International career
2010	Germany U20	1	(1)
- * Club domestic league appearances and goals

Collin Quaner (born 18 June 1991) is a German former professional footballer who played as a forward.

== Early life ==
Quaner grew up in Düsseldorf-Gerresheim, where his parents still live. He is of Ghanaian ancestry. His father is Ghanaian while his mother is German.

== Career ==
=== Arminia Bielefeld ===
In June 2010 Quaner joined 2. Bundesliga club Arminia Bielefeld from Fortuna Düsseldorf where he had played for Fortuna Düsseldorf II and the club's under-19 youth team. He signed a two-year contract with Arminia Bielefeld.

In September 2010 Quaner was invited to a training course of the Germany U20 national team by coach Frank Wormuth. He also appeared in a match against the Switzerland U20, scoring the second goal in a 3–0 win.

=== Union Berlin ===
In July 2015, after VfR Aalen were relegated to the 3. Liga, Quaner moved on a free transfer to 2. Bundesliga side Union Berlin signing a two-year contract until 2017.

=== Huddersfield Town ===
On 20 January 2017, Quaner completed a move to EFL Championship club Huddersfield Town for an undisclosed fee, signing a three-and-a-half-year contract. He scored his first goal for the club on his debut against Rochdale in the FA Cup on 28 January 2017, and he helped the club win promotion to the Premier League in May 2017 via the play-offs with Quaner creating Nahki Wells' equaliser in the semi-final second-leg at Sheffield Wednesday just one minute after his introduction as a substitute. The Terriers went on to win both the semi-final and final, in which Quaner also came off the bench, on penalties. He was released by Huddersfield in July 2020.

==== Ipswich Town (loan) ====
On 8 January 2019, Quaner was loaned to Ipswich Town in a season which saw the club relegated.

=== St Mirren ===
Six months after being released by Huddersfield, Quaner signed with Scottish Premiership side St Mirren on 8 January 2021, on a deal short-term deal until the end of the 2020–21 season.

=== Austria Klagenfurt and retirement ===
In November 2021 Quaner trained with Austria Klagenfurt before signing a contract until summer 2023. In December he agreed the termination of his contract and ended his playing career citing persistent knee and achilles problems.

== Career statistics ==
Appearances and goals by club, season and competition
Club	Season	League			National cup		League cup		Other		Total	
Club	Season	Division	Apps	Goals	Apps	Goals	Apps	Goals	Apps	Goals	Apps	Goals
Fortuna Düsseldorf II	2009–10	Regionalliga West	1	0	—		—		—		1	0
Arminia Bielefeld II	2010–11	Regionalliga West	8	1	—		—		—		8	1
Arminia Bielefeld	2010–11	2. Bundesliga	18	1	1	0	—		—		19	1
FC Ingolstadt II	2011–12	Regionalliga Süd	2	0	—		—		—		2	0
FC Ingolstadt II	2012–13	Regionalliga Süd	8	2	—		—		—		8	2
FC Ingolstadt II	2013–14	Regionalliga Süd	4	1	—		—		—		4	1
FC Ingolstadt II	Total		14	3	0	0	0	0	0	0	14	3
FC Ingolstadt	2011–12	2. Bundesliga	15	1	1	0	—		—		16	1
FC Ingolstadt	2012–13	2. Bundesliga	1	0	0	0	—		—		1	0
FC Ingolstadt	2013–14	2. Bundesliga	11	1	0	0	—		—		11	1
FC Ingolstadt	Total		27	2	1	0	0	0	0	0	28	2
Hansa Rostock (loan)	2012–13	3. Liga	7	0	0	0	—		—		7	0
VfR Aalen	2014–15	2. Bundesliga	27	6	1	0	—		—		28	6
Union Berlin	2015–16	2. Bundesliga	15	1	1	1	—		—		16	2
Union Berlin	2016–17	2. Bundesliga	14	7	2	1	—		—		16	8
Union Berlin	Total		29	8	3	2	0	0	0	0	32	10
Huddersfield Town	2016–17	Championship	17	2	3	1	0	0	3 (Note: Appearances in EFL Championship play-offs)	0	23	3
Huddersfield Town	2017–18	Premier League	25	0	4	0	1	0	—		30	0
Huddersfield Town	2018–19	Premier League	2	0	—		—		—		2	0
Huddersfield Town	2019–20	Championship	5	0	—		—		—		5	0
Huddersfield Town	Total		49	2	7	1	1	0	3	0	60	3
Ipswich Town (loan)	2018–19	Championship	16	4	0	0	0	0	—		16	4
St. Mirren	2020–21	Scottish Premiership	6	1	2	0	0	0	—		8	1
Career total			184	28	11	3	1	0	3	0	199	31

== Honours ==
Huddersfield Town

- EFL Championship play-offs: 2017
