= Elias Kachunga =

German association football player

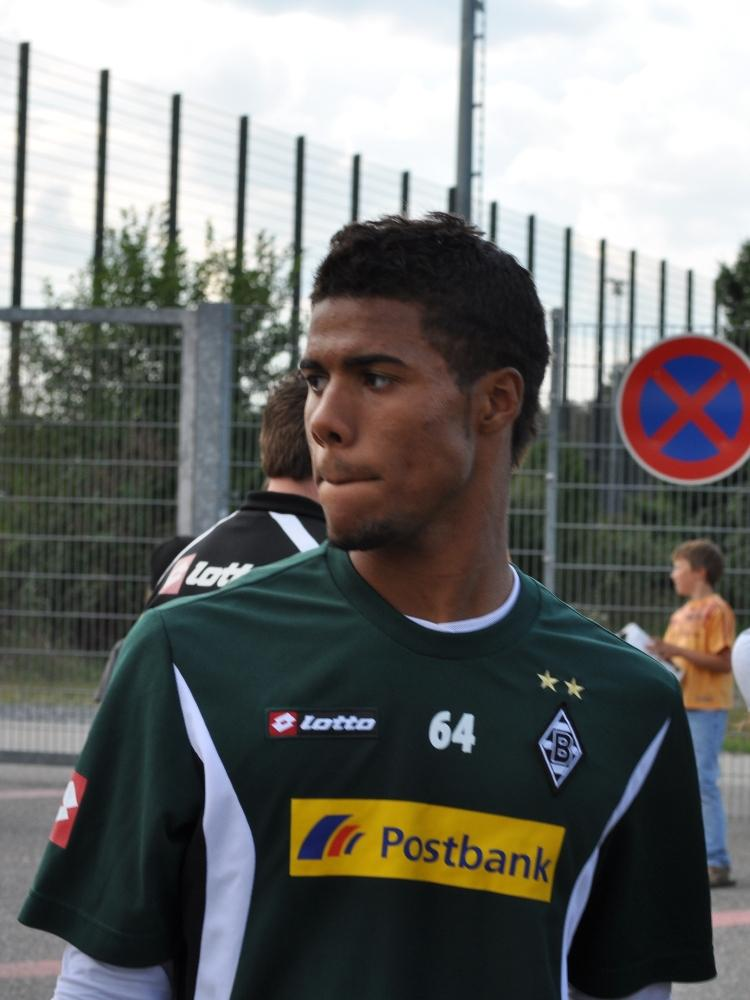
- Kachunga with Borussia Mönchengladbach in 2010

Personal information
- Full name: Elias Kachunga
- Date of birth: 22 April 1992 (age 34)
- Place of birth: Haan, Germany
- Height: 1.78 m (5 ft 10 in)
- Position: Forward

Team information
- Current team: Solihull Moors

Senior career*
Years	Team	Apps	(Gls)
2009–2012	Borussia Mönchengladbach II	47	(13)
2010–2014	Borussia Mönchengladbach	2	(0)
2012	→ VfL Osnabrück (loan)	17	(10)
2012	→ Hertha BSC II (loan)	4	(3)
2012	→ Hertha BSC (loan)	2	(0)
2012–2013	→ SC Paderborn (loan)	13	(3)
2013–2015	SC Paderborn	65	(12)
2015–2017	FC Ingolstadt 04	10	(0)
2016–2017	→ Huddersfield Town (loan)	42	(12)
2017–2020	Huddersfield Town	75	(4)
2020–2021	Sheffield Wednesday	27	(0)
2021–2023	Bolton Wanderers	70	(2)
2023–2026	Cambridge United	96	(12)
2026–	Solihull Moors	0	(0)

International career^{‡}
2008–2009	Germany U17	8	(1)
2009–2010	Germany U18	7	(2)
2010–2011	Germany U19	7	(3)
2011–2012	Germany U20	3	(0)
2014	Germany U21	2	(0)
2017	DR Congo	1	(0)
- * Club domestic league appearances and goals as of 19:04, 5 August 2026 (UTC) ‡ National team caps and goals as of 26 March 2017

Elias Kachunga (born 22 April 1992) is a professional footballer who plays as a forward for National League club Solihull Moors. Born in Germany, Kachunga played for the DR Congo national team.

== Early and personal life ==
Kachunga was born in Haan, Germany, to a Congolese father and a German mother.

== Club career ==
Kachunga spent his early career in Germany with Borussia Mönchengladbach, VfL Osnabrück, Hertha BSC and SC Paderborn. Following Paderborn's relegation, he moved to FC Ingolstadt 04 in June 2015. He was the club's record signing, at a transfer fee of €1.7 million. He signed a season-long loan deal with an option to buy at the end with English Championship club Huddersfield Town in June 2016. He made his debut for them on 6 August 2016, scoring the first goal in a 2–1 win over Brentford. On 22 March 2017, Huddersfield paid Ingolstadt £1.1 million to turn Kachunga's loan deal into a permanent transfer.

In December 2017 he was ruled-out for three months due to injury.

He was released by Huddersfield at the end of the 2019–20 season.

On 2 September 2020, he was signed by Sheffield Wednesday on a free transfer. He made his debut coming off the bench against Cardiff City on the opening day of the season. He scored his first goal for Wednesday in a 2-0 EFL Cup win against Rochdale on 15 September 2020.

On 20 May 2021, it was announced that he would leave Sheffield Wednesday at the end of the season, following the expiry of his contract.

On 6 August 2021, he signed for Bolton Wanderers. He made his debut a day later as a late substitute against Milton Keynes Dons and provided an assist for Alex Baptiste in the 95th minute, rescuing a point for Bolton in a 3–3 draw. His first Bolton goal came on 7 November in a 2–2 draw against Stockport County in the FA Cup. On 2 April, he started in the 2023 EFL Trophy Final. He scored the third goal, with the Final against Plymouth Argyle eventually ending with a 4–0 Bolton win. On 23 May the club confirmed that Kachunga would be leaving at the end of his contract in June.

On 1 August 2023 he signed for Cambridge United. He was released by the club at the end of the 2025–26 season.

In October 2026 he signed for Solihull Moors.

== International career ==
Kachunga has represented Germany at all youth age levels from under-17 through to under-21.

He debuted for the senior DR Congo national team in a friendly 2–1 loss to Kenya on 26 March 2017.

== Career statistics ==
As of match played on 1 January 2026

Appearances and goals by club, season and competition
Club	Season	League			National Cup		League Cup		Other		Total	
Club	Season	Division	Apps	Goals	Apps	Goals	Apps	Goals	Apps	Goals	Apps	Goals
Borussia Mönchengladbach II	2009–10	Regionalliga West	4	0	—		—		—		4	0
Borussia Mönchengladbach II	2010–11	Regionalliga West	24	1	—		—		—		24	1
Borussia Mönchengladbach II	2011–12	Regionalliga West	18	12	—		—		—		18	12
Borussia Mönchengladbach II	Total		47	13	0	0	0	0	0	0	47	13
Borussia Mönchengladbach	2010–11	Bundesliga	2	0	0	0	—		—		2	0
Borussia Mönchengladbach	2011–12	Bundesliga	0	0	0	0	—		—		0	0
Borussia Mönchengladbach	2012–13	Bundesliga	0	0	0	0	—		—		0	0
Borussia Mönchengladbach	Total		2	0	0	0	0	0	0	0	2	0
VfL Osnabrück (loan)	2011–12	3. Liga	17	10	0	0	—		—		17	10
Hertha BSC II (loan)	2012–13	Regionalliga Nordost	4	3	—		—		—		4	3
Hertha BSC (loan)	2012–13	2. Bundesliga	2	0	1	0	—		—		3	0
SC Paderborn (loan)	2012–13	2. Bundesliga	13	3	0	0	—		—		13	3
SC Paderborn	2013–14	2. Bundesliga	33	6	2	0	—		—		35	6
SC Paderborn	2014–15	Bundesliga	32	6	0	0	—		—		32	6
SC Paderborn	Total		65	12	2	0	0	0	0	0	67	12
FC Ingolstadt 04	2015–16	Bundesliga	10	0	0	0	—		—		10	0
FC Ingolstadt 04	2016–17	Bundesliga	0	0	0	0	—		—		0	0
FC Ingolstadt 04	Total		10	0	0	0	0	0	0	0	10	0
Huddersfield Town (loan)	2016–17	Championship	42	12	2	0	1	1	3 (Note: Appearance(s) in the EFL Championship play-offs.)	0	48	13
Huddersfield Town	2017–18	Premier League	19	1	0	0	2	0	—		22	1
Huddersfield Town	2018–19	Premier League	20	0	1	0	1	0	—		22	0
Huddersfield Town	2019–20	Championship	36	3	0	0	1	0	—		37	3
Huddersfield Town	Total		75	4	1	0	4	0	0	0	81	4
Sheffield Wednesday	2020–21	Championship	27	0	0	0	2	1	—		29	1
Bolton Wanderers	2021–22	League One	32	2	2	2	2	0	5 (Note: Appearance(s) in the EFL Trophy.)	0	41	4
Bolton Wanderers	2022–23	League One	38	0	1	0	2	1	9 (Note: Seven appearances in the EFL Trophy, two appearances in the League One play-offs)	3	50	4
Bolton Wanderers	Total		70	2	3	2	4	1	14	3	91	8
Cambridge United	2023–24	League One	36	5	1	1	1	0	1	0	39	6
Cambridge United	2024–25	League One	43	7	2	0	1	0	1	0	47	7
Cambridge United	2025–26	League Two	17	0	2	0	3	0	4	3	26	3
Cambridge United	Total		96	12	5	1	5	0	6	3	112	16
Solihull Moors	2026–27	National League	0	0	0	0	—		0	0	0	0
Career total			470	71	14	3	12	3	23	6	522	84

== Honours ==
Huddersfield Town

- EFL Championship play-offs: 2017

Bolton Wanderers

- EFL Trophy: 2022–23

Cambridge United

- EFL League Two third-place promotion: 2025–26
