= Lewis O'Brien (footballer) =

English footballer (born 1998)

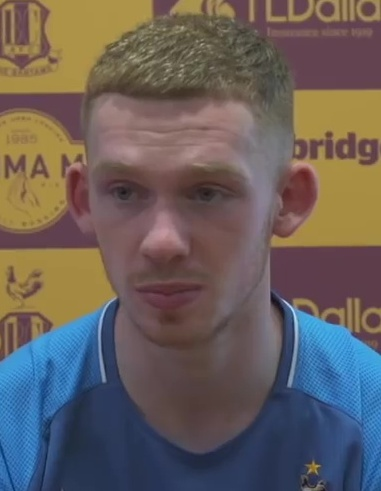
- O'Brien in 2018

Personal information
- Full name: Lewis John O'Brien
- Date of birth: 14 October 1998 (age 28)
- Place of birth: Colchester, England
- Height: 5 ft 8 in (1.73 m)
- Position: Midfielder

Team information
- Current team: Wrexham
- Number: 27

Youth career
- 2009–2018: Huddersfield Town

Senior career*
Years	Team	Apps	(Gls)
2018–2022	Huddersfield Town	123	(8)
2018–2019	→ Bradford City (loan)	40	(4)
2022–2025	Nottingham Forest	13	(1)
2023	→ D.C. United (loan)	17	(1)
2023–2024	→ Middlesbrough (loan)	23	(0)
2024	→ Los Angeles FC (loan)	9	(0)
2025	→ Swansea City (loan)	16	(1)
2025–	Wrexham	53	(5)
- * Club domestic league appearances and goals as of 09:16, 22 November 2026 (UTC)

Lewis John O'Brien (born 14 October 1998) is an English professional footballer who plays as a midfielder for EFL Championship club Wrexham.

== Career ==
=== Huddersfield Town ===
Born in Colchester, O'Brien began his career with Huddersfield Town at age 11, where he was named Academy Player of the Year for the 2017–18 season. After signing a new three-year contract with Huddersfield in May 2018, he moved on loan to Bradford City in August 2018 for the 2018–19 season. His signing was met with some criticism on social media by Bradford City fans.

He made his professional debut for Bradford City on 8 September 2018, and later that month was praised by manager David Hopkin. By mid-November 2018 he had become a first-team regular. In December 2018 he was praised by City teammates Hope Akpan, and Jack Payne. Later that month, journalist Simon Parker said that O'Brien was "enjoying an outstanding first season in senior football" and was "a driving force in City's push to get out of the League One drop zone". O'Brien stated playing for City had been "fantastic", that he "felt ready for the challenge", and that he was "happy and determined to enjoy the experience".

On 1 January 2019 he scored his first senior goal, in a 3–0 league win at home to Accrington Stanley. In that same match he was later injured and had to be substituted, although the injury was later announced to not be as serious as feared, and he trained in preparation for a league game away at Barnsley on 12 January. In January 2019 it was announced that his loan would continue until the end of the 2018–19 season, after Bradford reached a new deal with parent club Huddersfield. In February 2019, following a poor run of results which saw the club drop into the relegation zone, O'Brien spoke about his confidence in the players turning things around. Later that month O'Brien was described by The Guardian as a "smash hit".

In March 2019 new manager Gary Bowyer rested O'Brien from first-team duties, ending "a run of 30 successive league starts" in order to be fully fit for the club's relegation battle. Following a return to first-team action, O'Brien spoke about his experience during his first year as a senior professional. In May 2019 he praised David Ball for helping him develop during his time with Bradford, having previously commended Ball for taking him under his wing.

In July 2019, following the end of his loan spell with Bradford and upon his return to parent club Huddersfield, O'Brien was given an improved three-year contract. He won the EFL Goal of the Month in January 2020. He was Huddersfield Town's 'Player of the Year' for the 2019–20 season.

In August 2020, O'Brien suffered a quad injury, missing the start of the 2020–21 season. He remained injured a month later.

O'Brien signed a new contract with the club in September 2021. At the end of the 2021–22 season he was linked with a move to the Premier League.

=== Nottingham Forest ===
Following Huddersfield's defeat in the 2022 EFL Championship play-off final, O'Brien, along with his teammate Harry Toffolo, moved to Premier League side Nottingham Forest, who defeated Huddersfield in the aforementioned final.

In January 2023, O'Brien was due to be loaned to Blackburn Rovers, but the transfer was not ratified by the English Football League due to late submission of paperwork. O'Brien was subsequently left out of Nottingham Forest's 25-man Premier League squad for the rest of the season.

In March 2023 he began talks with Major League Soccer team D.C. United for a loan move. A short-term loan deal was signed on 16 March, running until 16 July 2023.

On 31 August 2023, O'Brien joined Championship club Middlesbrough on loan until the end of the 2023–24 season. He suffered leg and ankle injuries on 30 September and was ruled out for at least two months.

On 30 July 2024, O'Brien returned to Major League Soccer to join Los Angeles FC on loan for the remainder of the 2024 season, with a purchase option.

In February 2025 O'Brien moved on loan to Swansea City.

=== Wrexham ===
On 24 July 2025, it was announced O'Brien had signed for EFL Championship club Wrexham for an undisclosed fee.

== Personal life ==
O'Brien is a Manchester City fan, and grew up watching the team with his father. During his time with Bradford City, O'Brien used to entertain his teammates by singing.

== Career statistics ==
As of match played 21 November 2026

Appearances and goals by club, season and competition
Club	Season	League			National cup (Note: Includes FA Cup, US Open Cup)		League cup (Note: Includes EFL Cup)		Other		Total	
Club	Season	Division	Apps	Goals	Apps	Goals	Apps	Goals	Apps	Goals	Apps	Goals
Huddersfield Town	2018–19	Premier League	0	0	0	0	0	0	0	0	0	0
Huddersfield Town	2019–20	Championship	38	2	1	0	0	0	0	0	39	2
Huddersfield Town	2020–21	Championship	42	3	0	0	0	0	0	0	42	3
Huddersfield Town	2021–22	Championship	43	3	2	0	2	0	3 (Note: Appearances in the EFL Championship play-offs)	0	50	3
Huddersfield Town	Total		123	8	3	0	2	0	3	0	131	8
Bradford City (loan)	2018–19	League One	40	4	4	0	0	0	2 (Note: Appearances in the EFL Trophy)	0	46	4
Nottingham Forest	2022–23	Premier League	13	1	1	0	3	0	0	0	17	1
Nottingham Forest	2023–24	Premier League	0	0	0	0	0	0	0	0	0	0
Nottingham Forest	2024–25	Premier League	0	0	0	0	0	0	0	0	0	0
Nottingham Forest	Total		13	1	1	0	3	0	0	0	17	1
D.C. United (loan)	2023	Major League Soccer	17	1	1	0	0	0	0	0	18	1
Middlesbrough (loan)	2023–24	Championship	23	0	0	0	2	0	0	0	25	0
Los Angeles FC (loan)	2024	Major League Soccer	9	0	2	0	0	0	4 (Note: Appearances in MLS Cup Playoffs)	0	15	0
Swansea City (loan)	2024–25	Championship	16	1	0	0	0	0	0	0	16	1
Wrexham	2025–26	Championship	38	4	3	0	4	0	0	0	45	4
Wrexham	2026–27	Championship	15	1	0	0	1	0	0	0	16	1
Wrexham	Total		53	5	3	0	5	0	0	0	61	5
Career total			293	20	13	0	12	0	9	0	328	20

== Honours ==
Los Angeles FC

- U.S. Open Cup: 2024

Individual

- Huddersfield Town Player of the Year: 2019–20
