= 2018–19 Huddersfield Town A.F.C. season =

Huddersfield Town
2018–19 season
- Chairman: Dean Hoyle
- Head Coach: David Wagner (until 14 January); Mark Hudson (caretaker, 14–21 January); Jan Siewert (from 21 January)
- Stadium: John Smith's Stadium
- Premier League: 20th (relegated)
- FA Cup: Third round (eliminated by Bristol City)
- EFL Cup: Second round (eliminated by Stoke City)
- Top goalscorer: League: Karlan Grant (4); All: Karlan Grant (4)
- Highest home attendance: 24,263 vs Liverpool (20 October 2018)
- Lowest home attendance: 17,082 vs Fulham (5 November 2018)
- Average home league attendance: 22,660
- Biggest win: 2–0 vs Wolverhampton Wanderers (25 November 2018)
- Biggest defeat: 1–6 vs Manchester City (19 August 2018)
| Home colours | Away colours | Third colours |

The 2018–19 season is Huddersfield Town's 110th year in existence and second season in the Premier League following promotion via the 2017 Championship play-off final. The club has finished their FA Cup and EFL Cup campaigns. They suffered the joint-earliest relegation to the Championship since Derby County in 2008 after a 2–0 defeat to Crystal Palace on 30 March 2019.

The season covers the period from 1 July 2018 to 30 June 2019.

== Technical staff ==
| Position | Name |
|---|---|
| Head coach | (Germany) Jan Siewert |
| Assistant head coach | (Germany) Andreas Winkler |
| First team coach | (England) Andrew Hughes |
| Head of goalkeeping | (England) Paul Clements |
| Head of performance services | (England) John Iga |
| Head of medical | (England) Ian Kirkpatrick |

== First team players ==
| No. | Pos. | Player | Nationality | Date of birth (age) | Since | Ends | Apps | Goals |
|---|---|---|---|---|---|---|---|---|
| 1 | GK | Jonas Lössl | (Denmark) | 1 February 1989 (age 37) | 2017 | 2019 | 69 | 0 |
| 2 | DF | Tommy Smith ^{(C)} | (England) | 14 April 1992 (age 34) | 2013 | 2020 | 195 | 5 |
| 5 | DF | Terence Kongolo | (Netherlands) | 14 February 1994 (age 32) | 2018 | 2022 | 43 | 1 |
| 6 | MF | Jonathan Hogg | (England) | 6 December 1988 (age 37) | 2013 | 2020 | 188 | 2 |
| 7 | MF | Juninho Bacuna | (Curaçao) | 7 August 1997 (age 28) | 2018 | 2021 | 18 | 1 |
| 8 | MF | Philip Billing | (Denmark) | 11 June 1996 (age 29) | 2014 | 2020 | 91 | 6 |
| 9 | FW | Elias Kachunga | (Democratic Republic of the Congo) | 22 April 1992 (age 34) | 2016 | 2020 | 88 | 14 |
| 10 | MF | Aaron Mooy | (Australia) | 15 September 1990 (age 35) | 2016 | 2020 | 114 | 10 |
| 11 | FW | Adama Diakhaby | (France) | 5 July 1996 (age 29) | 2018 | 2021 | 12 | 0 |
| 12 | GK | Ben Hamer | (England) | 20 November 1987 (age 38) | 2018 | 2021 | 6 | 0 |
| 13 | GK | Joel Coleman | (England) | 26 September 1995 (age 30) | 2016 | 2020 | 14 | 0 |
| 15 | DF | Chris Löwe | (Germany) | 16 April 1989 (age 37) | 2016 | 2020 | 96 | 2 |
| 16 | FW | Karlan Grant | (England) | 18 September 1997 (age 28) | 2019 | 2022 | 7 | 3 |
| 18 | FW | Isaac Mbenza | (Belgium) | 8 March 1996 (age 30) | 2018 | 2019 | 19 | 0 |
| 19 | MF | Danny Williams | (United States) | 8 March 1989 (age 37) | 2017 | 2019 | 29 | 1 |
| 20 | FW | Laurent Depoitre | (Belgium) | 7 December 1988 (age 37) | 2017 | 2019 | 60 | 6 |
| 21 | MF | Alex Pritchard | (England) | 3 May 1993 (age 33) | 2018 | 2021 | 42 | 2 |
| 24 | FW | Steve Mounié | (Benin) | 29 November 1994 (age 31) | 2017 | 2021 | 58 | 11 |
| 25 | DF | Mathias Jørgensen | (Denmark) | 23 April 1990 (age 36) | 2017 | 2020 | 65 | 3 |
| 26 | DF | Christopher Schindler | (Germany) | 29 April 1990 (age 36) | 2016 | 2021 | 119 | 3 |
| 27 | DF | Jon Gorenc Stanković | (Slovenia) | 14 January 1996 (age 30) | 2016 | 2020 | 21 | 1 |
| 29 | MF | Abdelhamid Sabiri | (Germany) | 28 November 1996 (age 29) | 2017 | 2020 | 13 | 0 |
| 33 | DF | Florent Hadergjonaj | (Kosovo) | 31 July 1994 (age 31) | 2017 | 2021 | 50 | 0 |
| 37 | DF | Erik Durm | (Germany) | 12 May 1992 (age 34) | 2018 | 2019 | 25 | 0 |
| 38 | DF | Demeaco Duhaney | (England) | 13 October 1998 (age 27) | 2018 | 2020 | 1 | 0 |
| 41 | MF | Matty Daly | (England) | 10 March 2001 (age 25) | 2018 | 2021 | 1 | 0 |
| 42 | MF | Jason Puncheon | (England) | 18 June 1986 (age 39) | 2019 | 2019 | 7 | 0 |
| 44 | MF | Aaron Rowe | (England) | 7 September 2000 (age 25) | 2018 | 2020 | 2 | 0 |

Last updated: 16 March 2019.
Source: Huddersfield Town A.F.C.

== New contracts ==
| No. | Pos. | Player | Date | Until | Source |
|---|---|---|---|---|---|
| | DF | (England) Romoney Crichlow-Noble | 3 July 2018 | 30 June 2020 | |
| | MF | (England) Dom Tear | 9 July 2018 | 30 June 2019 | |
| 41 | MF | (England) Matty Daly | 17 July 2018 | 30 June 2021 | |
| 13 | GK | (England) Joel Coleman | 27 July 2018 | 30 June 2020 | |
| 26 | DF | (Germany) Christopher Schindler | 10 August 2018 | 30 June 2021 | |
| 31 | GK | (England) Ryan Schofield | 5 October 2018 | 30 June 2020 | |
| | FW | (England) Rekeil Pyke | 7 November 2018 | 30 June 2020 | |
| | MF | (England) Scott High | 17 November 2018 | 30 June 2020 | |

== Transfers ==
=== In ===
| No. | Pos. | Player | From | Date | Fee | Source |
|---|---|---|---|---|---|---|
| 33 | DF | (Kosovo) Florent Hadergjonaj | (Germany) Ingolstadt 04 | 1 July 2018 | Undisclosed | |
| 1 | GK | (Denmark) Jonas Lössl | (Germany) Mainz 05 | 1 July 2018 | Undisclosed | |
| 12 | GK | (England) Ben Hamer | (England) Leicester City | 1 July 2018 | | |
| 5 | DF | (Netherlands) Terence Kongolo | (France) AS Monaco | 1 July 2018 | Undisclosed | |
| 14 | MF | (Egypt) Ramadan Sobhi | (England) Stoke City | 1 July 2018 | £5,700,000 | |
| 7 | MF | (Curaçao) Juninho Bacuna | (Netherlands) Groningen | 1 July 2018 | Undisclosed | |
| 37 | DF | (Germany) Erik Durm | (Germany) Borussia Dortmund | 13 July 2018 | Undisclosed | |
| 11 | FW | (France) Adama Diakhaby | (France) AS Monaco | 20 July 2018 | Undisclosed | |
| 38 | DF | (England) Demeaco Duhaney | (England) Manchester City | 17 August 2018 | | |
| | DF | (England) Jaden Brown | (England) Tottenham Hotspur | 1 January 2019 | Compensation | |
| 16 | FW | (England) Karlan Grant | (England) Charlton Athletic | 30 January 2019 | Undisclosed | |

=== Loan in ===
| No. | Pos. | Player | From | Date | Until | Fee | Source |
|---|---|---|---|---|---|---|---|
| 18 | FW | (Belgium) Isaac Mbenza | (France) Montpellier | 9 August 2018 | 30 June 2019 | | |
| 42 | MF | (England) Jason Puncheon | (England) Crystal Palace | 4 January 2019 | 30 June 2019 | | |

=== Out ===
| No. | Pos. | Player | To | Date | Fee | Source |
|---|---|---|---|---|---|---|
| 28 | GK | (England) Robert Green | (England) Chelsea | 1 July 2018 | Free | |
| 4 | MF | (England) Dean Whitehead | Retired | 1 July 2018 | —N/a | |
| 28 | MF | (Republic of Ireland) Sean Scannell | (England) Bradford City | 19 July 2018 | Undisclosed | |
| | DF | (England) Tareiq Holmes-Dennis | (England) Bristol Rovers | 23 July 2018 | Undisclosed | |
| 11 | MF | (England) Tom Ince | (England) Stoke City | 24 July 2018 | Undisclosed | |
| | FW | (England) Jordy Hiwula | (England) Coventry City | 2 August 2018 | Undisclosed | |
| | DF | (England) Jordan Williams | (England) Barnsley | 8 August 2018 | Undisclosed | |
| 3 | DF | (England) Scott Malone | (England) Derby County | 8 August 2018 | Undisclosed | |
| 44 | DF | (Germany) Michael Hefele | (England) Nottingham Forest | 9 August 2018 | Undisclosed | |

=== Loan out ===
| No. | Pos. | Player | To | Date | Until | Fee | Source |
|---|---|---|---|---|---|---|---|
| | MF | (England) Regan Booty | (England) Aldershot Town | 3 July 2018 | 30 June 2019 | | |
| | FW | (England) Rekeil Pyke | (England) Wrexham | 10 July 2018 | 30 January 2019 | | |
| | MF | (England) Jack Payne | (England) Bradford City | 16 July 2018 | 30 June 2019 | | |
| 13 | GK | (England) Joel Coleman | (England) Shrewsbury Town | 27 July 2018 | 10 January 2019 | | |
| | MF | (England) Lewis O'Brien | (England) Bradford City | 31 August 2018 | 30 June 2019 | | |
| 14 | MF | (Egypt) Ramadan Sobhi | (Egypt) Al-Ahly | 1 January 2019 | 30 June 2019 | £800,000 | |
| 17 | MF | (Netherlands) Rajiv van La Parra | (England) Middlesbrough | 1 January 2019 | 30 June 2019 | | |
| | DF | (England) Jaden Brown | (England) Exeter City | 18 January 2019 | 30 June 2019 | | |
| | FW | (England) Rekeil Pyke | (England) Rochdale | 30 January 2019 | 30 June 2019 | | |
| | DF | (England) Romoney Crichlow-Noble | (England) Bradford (Park Avenue) | 31 January 2019 | 30 June 2019 | | |
| | DF | (England) Rarmani Edmonds-Green | (England) Brighouse Town | 31 January 2019 | 30 June 2019 | | |
| | DF | (England) Ben Jackson | (England) Darlington | 15 March 2019 | 30 June 2019 | | |
| | FW | (England) Kit Elliott | (England) Darlington | 15 March 2019 | 30 June 2019 | | |

== Pre-season ==
=== Friendlies ===
| 10 July 2018 Friendly | Bury | 0–4 | Huddersfield Town | Bury |
| 19:45 BST | | Report | Prichard 21' van La Parra 49'; Sabiri 59'; Daly 80' | Stadium: Gigg Lane |

| 14 July 2018 Friendly | Accrington Stanley | 3–0 | Huddersfield Town | Accrington |
| 15:00 BST | Jackson 19', 41'; McConville 83' | Report | | Stadium: Wham Stadium; Attendance: 1,653 |

| 18 July 2018 Friendly | Dynamo Dresden | 0–0 | Huddersfield Town | Rüsselsheim am Main, Germany |
| 18:30 CEST | | Report | | Stadium: Stadion am Sommerdamm |

| 22 July 2018 Friendly | Darmstadt 98 | 1–1 | Huddersfield Town | Darmstadt, Germany |
| 15:00 CEST | Stark 47' | Report | Mounié 80' | Stadium: Merck-Stadion am Böllenfalltor |

| 25 July 2018 Friendly | Huddersfield Town | 3–1 | Lyon | Huddersfield |
| 19:45 BST | Kongolo 68'; Depoitre 80', 89' | Report | Cornet 50' | Stadium: John Smith's Stadium; Referee: Anthony Taylor |

| 31 July 2018 Friendly | Bologna | 1–2 | Huddersfield Town | Brixen im Thale, Austria |
| 18:00 CEST | Falcinelli 56' | | Mooy 9' (pen.); Mounié 90+2' | Stadium: Sportverein Brixen |

| 3 August 2018 Friendly | RB Leipzig | 0–3 | Huddersfield Town | Schwaz, Austria |
| 17:00 CEST | | Report | Mounié 10'; Diakhaby 60'; Billing 66' | Stadium: Sportzentrum Schwaz |

== Competitions ==
=== Overview ===
| Competition | First match | Last match | Starting round | Final position | Record | | | | | | | |
| Competition | First match | Last match | Starting round | Final position | Pld | W | D | L | GF | GA | GD | Win % |
|---|---|---|---|---|---|---|---|---|---|---|---|---|
| Premier League | 11 August 2018 | 12 May 2019 | Matchday 1 | 20th | 38 | 3 | 7 | 28 | 22 | 76 | −54 | 7.89 |
| FA Cup | 5 January 2019 | 5 January 2019 | Third round | Third round | 1 | 0 | 0 | 1 | 0 | 1 | −1 | 0.00 |
| EFL Cup | 28 August 2018 | 28 August 2018 | Second round | Second round | 1 | 0 | 0 | 1 | 0 | 2 | −2 | 0.00 |
| Total | | | | | 40 | 3 | 7 | 30 | 22 | 79 | −57 | 7.50 |

Last updated: 12 May 2019
Source: Competitions

=== Premier League ===
==== League table ====
| Pos | Team | Pld | W | D | L | GF | GA | GD | Pts | Qualification or relegation |
|---|---|---|---|---|---|---|---|---|---|---|
| 16 | Southampton | 38 | 9 | 12 | 17 | 45 | 65 | −20 | 39 | |
| 17 | Brighton & Hove Albion | 38 | 9 | 9 | 20 | 35 | 60 | −25 | 36 | |
| 18 | Cardiff City (R) | 38 | 10 | 4 | 24 | 34 | 69 | −35 | 34 | Relegation to EFL Championship |
| 19 | Fulham (R) | 38 | 7 | 5 | 26 | 34 | 81 | −47 | 26 | Relegation to EFL Championship |
| 20 | Huddersfield Town (R) | 38 | 3 | 7 | 28 | 22 | 76 | −54 | 16 | Relegation to EFL Championship |

Source: Premier League
Rules for classification: 1) Points; 2) Goal difference; 3) Goals scored; 4) Play-offs (only if needed to decide champion, teams for relegation or teams for UEFA competitions).
(R) Relegated

==== Results summary ====
| Overall | | | | | | | | Home | | | | | | Away | | | | | |
| Pld | W | D | L | GF | GA | GD | Pts | W | D | L | GF | GA | GD | W | D | L | GF | GA | GD |
|---|---|---|---|---|---|---|---|---|---|---|---|---|---|---|---|---|---|---|---|
| 38 | 3 | 7 | 28 | 22 | 76 | −54 | 16 | 2 | 3 | 14 | 10 | 31 | −21 | 1 | 4 | 14 | 12 | 45 | −33 |

Last updated: 12 May 2019.
Source: Premier League

==== Results by matchday ====
| Matchday | 1 | 2 | 3 | 4 | 5 | 6 | 7 | 8 | 9 | 10 | 11 | 12 | 13 | 14 | 15 | 16 | 17 | 18 | 19 | 20 | 21 | 22 | 23 | 24 | 25 | 26 | 27 | 28 | 29 | 30 | 31 | 32 | 33 | 34 | 35 | 36 | 37 | 38 |
|---|---|---|---|---|---|---|---|---|---|---|---|---|---|---|---|---|---|---|---|---|---|---|---|---|---|---|---|---|---|---|---|---|---|---|---|---|---|---|
| Ground | H | A | H | A | H | A | H | A | H | A | H | H | A | H | A | A | H | H | A | A | H | A | H | H | A | H | A | H | A | H | A | A | H | A | H | A | H | A |
| Result | L | L | D | D | L | L | L | D | L | L | W | D | W | L | L | L | L | L | L | L | L | D | L | L | L | L | L | W | L | L | L | L | L | L | L | L | D | D |
| Position | 19 | 20 | 19 | 17 | 17 | 20 | 20 | 18 | 19 | 20 | 18 | 19 | 14 | 17 | 17 | 18 | 19 | 19 | 20 | 20 | 20 | 20 | 20 | 20 | 20 | 20 | 20 | 20 | 20 | 20 | 20 | 20 | 20 | 20 | 20 | 20 | 20 | 20 |

Updated to match(es) played on 12 May 2019. Source: Statto.com
A = Away; H = Home; W = Win; D = Draw; L = Loss

==== Matches ====
On 14 June 2018, the Premier League fixtures for the forthcoming season were announced.

| 11 August 2018 1 | Huddersfield Town | 0–3 | Chelsea | Huddersfield |
| 15:00 BST | Schindler (yellow card) 44'; Kongolo (yellow card) 83' | Report | Kanté 34'; Jorginho 45' (pen.); David Luiz (yellow card) 69'; Pedro 80' | Stadium: John Smith's Stadium; Attendance: 24,121; Referee: Chris Kavanagh |

| 19 August 2018 2 | Manchester City | 6–1 | Huddersfield Town | Manchester |
| 13:30 BST | Agüero 25', 35', 75'; Gabriel Jesus 31'; D. Silva 48'; Kongolo 84' (o.g.) | Report | Stanković 43'; Billing (yellow card) 51'; Schindler (yellow card) 69' | Stadium: City of Manchester Stadium; Attendance: 54,021; Referee: Andre Marriner |

| 25 August 2018 3 | Huddersfield Town | 0–0 | Cardiff City | Huddersfield |
| 15:00 BST | Hogg (red card) 63' | Report | Arter (yellow card) 63' | Stadium: John Smith's Stadium; Attendance: 21,193; Referee: Michael Oliver |

| 1 September 2018 4 | Everton | 1–1 | Huddersfield Town | Liverpool |
| 15:00 BST | Calvert-Lewin 36'; Holgate (yellow card) 55'; Davies (yellow card) 63'; Schneiderlin (yellow card) 86' | Report | Billing (yellow card) 4' (goal) 34'; Hadergjonaj (yellow card) 73'; Jorgensen (yellow card) 89' | Stadium: Goodison Park; Attendance: 38,767; Referee: Stuart Attwell |

| 15 September 2018 5 | Huddersfield Town | 0–1 | Crystal Palace | Huddersfield |
| 15:00 BST | Jørgensen (yellow card) 27' | Report | McArthur (yellow card) 11'; Zaha (yellow card) 29' (goal) 38' | Stadium: John Smith's Stadium; Attendance: 23,696; Referee: Lee Mason |

| 22 September 2018 6 | Leicester City | 3–1 | Huddersfield Town | Leicester |
| 15:00 BST | Ndidi (yellow card) 18'; Iheanacho 19'; Ghezzal (yellow card) 43'; Maddison 66'; Vardy 75' | Report | Jorgensen 5'; Kongolo (yellow card) 47' | Stadium: King Power Stadium; Attendance: 31,676; Referee: David Coote |

| 29 September 2018 7 | Huddersfield Town | 0–2 | Tottenham Hotspur | Huddersfield |
| 15:00 BST | Jorgensen (yellow card) 44'; Billing (yellow card) 86' | Report | Kane 25', 34' (pen.); Rose (yellow card) 67'; Winks (yellow card) 81' | Stadium: John Smith's Stadium; Attendance: 23,885; Referee: Craig Pawson |

| 6 October 2018 8 | Burnley | 1–1 | Huddersfield Town | Burnley |
| 15:00 BST | Vokes 20'; Mee (yellow card) 74'; Lowton (yellow card) 90' | Report | Depoitre (yellow card) 58'; Schindler 66'; Jorgensen (yellow card) 76' | Stadium: Turf Moor; Attendance: 20,533; Referee: Chris Kavanagh |

| 20 October 2018 9 | Huddersfield Town | 0–1 | Liverpool | Huddersfield |
| 17:30 BST | | Report | Salah 24'; Lallana (yellow card) 36'; Sturridge (yellow card) 76' | Stadium: John Smith's Stadium; Attendance: 24,263; Referee: Michael Oliver |

| 27 October 2018 10 | Watford | 3–0 | Huddersfield Town | Watford |
| 15:00 BST | Pereyra 10'; Deulofeu 19'; Masina (yellow card) 67'; Success 80' | Report | Billing (yellow card) 34'; Mooy (yellow card) 86' | Stadium: Vicarage Road; Attendance: 20,457; Referee: Mike Dean |

| 5 November 2018 11 | Huddersfield Town | 1–0 | Fulham | Huddersfield |
| 20:00 GMT | Fosu-Mensah 29' (o.g.); Mbenza (yellow card) 89' | Report | Fosu-Mensah (yellow card) 34'; Mitrović (yellow card) 76' | Stadium: John Smith's Stadium; Attendance: 17,082; Referee: Anthony Taylor |

| 10 November 2018 12 | Huddersfield Town | 1–1 | West Ham United | Huddersfield |
| 15:00 GMT | Pritchard 6'; Jørgensen (yellow card) 36' | Report | Snodgrass (yellow card) 17'; Felipe Anderson 74' | Stadium: John Smith's Stadium; Attendance: 24,069; Referee: Chris Kavanagh |

| 25 November 2018 13 | Wolverhampton Wanderers | 0–2 | Huddersfield Town | Wolverhampton |
| 16:00 GMT | Neves (yellow card) 87' | Report | Mooy 6', 74'; Smith (yellow card) 17'; Hogg (yellow card) 60' | Stadium: Molineux Stadium; Attendance: 30,130; Referee: Kevin Friend |

| 1 December 2018 14 | Huddersfield Town | 1–2 | Brighton & Hove Albion | Huddersfield |
| 15:00 GMT | Jørgensen 1'; Mounié (red card) 32' | Report | Bruno (yellow card) 39'; Duffy 45+4'; Andone 69'; Balogun (yellow card) 82' | Stadium: John Smith's Stadium; Attendance: 22,973; Referee: Michael Oliver |

| 4 December 2018 15 | Bournemouth | 2–1 | Huddersfield Town | Bournemouth |
| 19:45 GMT | Wilson 5'; Fraser 22'; Daniels (yellow card) 64'; Francis (yellow card) 73'; Mousset (yellow card) 90'; L. Cook (yellow card) 90+4' | Report | Kongolo 38'; Mooy (yellow card) 57'; Billing (yellow card) 61' | Stadium: Vitality Stadium; Attendance: 9,980; Referee: Roger East |

| 8 December 2018 16 | Arsenal | 1–0 | Huddersfield Town | Holloway |
| 15:00 GMT | Xhaka (yellow card) 24'; Lichtsteiner (yellow card) 38'; Sokratis (yellow card) 40'; Mustafi (yellow card) 45+2'; Guendouzi (yellow card) 80'; Torreira 83' | Report | Pritchard (yellow card) 35'; Williams (yellow card) 38'; Smith (yellow card) 39'; Bacuna (yellow card) 85' | Stadium: Emirates Stadium; Attendance: 59,893; Referee: Paul Tierney |

| 15 December 2018 17 | Huddersfield Town | 0–1 | Newcastle United | Huddersfield |
| 15:00 GMT | Hogg (yellow card) 72' | Report | Lascelles (yellow card) 34'; Rondón 55' | Stadium: John Smith's Stadium; Attendance: 24,036; Referee: Anthony Taylor |

| 22 December 2018 18 | Huddersfield Town | 1–3 | Southampton | Huddersfield |
| 15:00 GMT | Löwe (yellow card) 11'; Billing 58'; Jørgensen (yellow card) 63' | Report | Redmond 15'; Ings 42' (pen.); Valery (yellow card) 52'; Obafemi 71'; Stephens (yellow card) 84'; Højbjerg (yellow card) 86' | Stadium: John Smith's Stadium; Attendance: 22,384; Referee: Stuart Attwell |

| 26 December 2018 19 | Manchester United | 3–1 | Huddersfield Town | Manchester |
| 15:00 GMT | Matić 28'; Fred (yellow card) 30'; Pogba 64', 78' | Report | Kachunga (yellow card) 23'; Jørgensen 88' | Stadium: Old Trafford; Attendance: 74,523; Referee: Jonathan Moss |

| 29 December 2018 20 | Fulham | 1–0 | Huddersfield Town | London |
| 15:00 GMT | Seri (yellow card) 25'; Odoi (yellow card) 44'; Christie (yellow card) 64'; Kamara (penalty missed) 82'; Mitrović 90+1' | Report | Hogg (yellow card) 69' | Stadium: Craven Cottage; Attendance: 24,423; Referee: Kevin Friend |

| 2 January 2019 21 | Huddersfield Town | 1–2 | Burnley | Huddersfield |
| 19:45 GMT | Schindler (yellow card) 30' (yellow-red card) 42'; Mounié 33' | Report | Mee (yellow card) 14'; Bardsley (yellow card) 31'; Wood 40' (yellow card) 78'; Barnes 74'; Brady (red card) 90'; Heaton (yellow card) 90+3' | Stadium: John Smith's Stadium; Attendance: 23,715; Referee: Mike Dean |

| 12 January 2019 22 | Cardiff City | 0–0 | Huddersfield Town | Cardiff |
| 15:00 GMT | Arter (yellow card) 33'; Hoilett (yellow card) 71'; Bennett (yellow card) 82' | Report | Schindler (yellow card) 10' | Stadium: Cardiff City Stadium; Attendance: 30,725; Referee: Lee Mason |

| 20 January 2019 23 | Huddersfield Town | 0–3 | Manchester City | Huddersfield |
| 13:30 GMT | Bacuna (yellow card) 30'; Hogg (yellow card) 43' | Report | Danilo 18'; Walker (yellow card) 27'; Fernandinho (yellow card) 50'; Sterling 54'; Sané 56' | Stadium: John Smith's Stadium; Attendance: 24,190; Referee: Andre Marriner |

| 29 January 2019 24 | Huddersfield Town | 0–1 | Everton | Huddersfield |
| 19:45 GMT | Puncheon (yellow card) 65' | Report | Richarlison 3'; Bernard (yellow card) 31'; Tosun (yellow card) 43'; Digne (red card) 66'; Gomes (yellow card) 87'; Calvert-Lewin (yellow card) 90+5' | Stadium: John Smith's Stadium; Attendance: 23,699; Referee: Stuart Attwell |

| 2 February 2019 25 | Chelsea | 5–0 | Huddersfield Town | Fulham |
| 15:00 GMT | Higuaín 16', 69'; Hazard 45+1' (pen.), 66'; Luiz 86' | Report | | Stadium: Stamford Bridge; Attendance: 40,626; Referee: Paul Tierney |

| 9 February 2019 26 | Huddersfield Town | 1–2 | Arsenal | Huddersfield |
| 15:00 GMT | Schindler (yellow card) 36'; Kongolo (yellow card) 49'; Grant 90+3'; Diakhaby (yellow card) 90+4' | Report | Iwobi 16'; Lacazette 44'; Maitland-Niles (yellow card) 55'; Kolašinac (yellow card) 90+3' | Stadium: John Smith's Stadium; Attendance: 24,182; Referee: Jonathan Moss |

| 23 February 2019 27 | Newcastle United | 2–0 | Huddersfield Town | Newcastle upon Tyne |
| 15:00 GMT | Yedlin (yellow card) 27'; Rondón 46'; Pérez 52'; Ritchie (yellow card) 57' | Report | Smith (red card) 20' | Stadium: St James' Park; Attendance: 52,174; Referee: Kevin Friend |

| 26 February 2019 28 | Huddersfield Town | 1–0 | Wolverhampton Wanderers | Huddersfield |
| 19:45 GMT | Billing (yellow card) 29'; Hogg (yellow card) 84'; Mounié 90+1' | Report | Bennett (yellow card) 43'; Doherty (yellow card) 89' | Stadium: John Smith's Stadium; Attendance: 22,714; Referee: David Coote |

| 2 March 2019 29 | Brighton & Hove Albion | 1–0 | Huddersfield Town | Falmer |
| 15:00 GMT | Murray (yellow card) 45'; Andone 79', (yellow card) 80' | Report | Mooy (yellow card) 58'; Mounié (yellow card) 63' | Stadium: Falmer Stadium; Attendance: 30,182; Referee: Mike Dean |

| 9 March 2019 30 | Huddersfield Town | 0–2 | Bournemouth | Huddersfield |
| 15:00 GMT | Kachunga (yellow card) 38'; Stanković (yellow card) 56'; Mooy (yellow card) 90' | Report | Wilson 20'; Fraser 67' (yellow card) 87' | Stadium: John Smith's Stadium; Attendance: 22,304; Referee: Anthony Taylor |

| 16 March 2019 31 | West Ham United | 4–3 | Huddersfield Town | Stratford |
| 15:00 GMT | Noble 15' (pen.); Ogbonna 75'; Hernández 84', 90+1' | Report | Bacuna 17'; Grant 30', 65'; Pritchard (yellow card) 74'; Billing (yellow card) 78' | Stadium: London Stadium; Attendance: 59,931; Referee: Jonathan Moss |

| 30 March 2019 32 | Crystal Palace | 2–0 | Huddersfield Town | Selhurst |
| 15:00 GMT | Milivojević 76' (pen.) van Aanholt 88' | Report | | Stadium: Selhurst Park; Attendance: 25,193; Referee: Lee Probert |

| 6 April 2019 33 | Huddersfield Town | 1–4 | Leicester City | Huddersfield |
| 15:00 BST | Hogg (yellow card) 17'; Stanković (yellow card) 40'; Mooy 52' (pen.); Kongolo (yellow card) 84' | Report | Tielemans 24'; Vardy 48', 84' (pen.); Maddison 79' | Stadium: John Smith's Stadium; Attendance: 24,126; Referee: David Coote |

| 13 April 2019 34 | Tottenham Hotspur | 4–0 | Huddersfield Town | Tottenham |
| 12:30 BST | Wanyama 24'; Moura 27', 87', 90+3'; Foyth (yellow card) 60'; Vertonghen (yellow card) 76' | Report | Löwe (yellow card) 45'; Bacuna (yellow card) 66' | Stadium: Tottenham Hotspur Stadium; Attendance: 58,308; Referee: Lee Mason |

| 20 April 2019 35 | Huddersfield Town | 1–2 | Watford | Huddersfield |
| 15:00 BST | Hogg (yellow card) 19'; Bacuna (yellow card) 24'; Grant 90+3' | Report | Deulofeu 5', 80'; Capoue (yellow card) 17'; Doucouré (yellow card) 90+1' | Stadium: John Smith's Stadium; Attendance: 23,957; Referee: Roger East |

| 26 April 2019 36 | Liverpool | 5–0 | Huddersfield Town | Liverpool |
| 20:00 BST | Keïta 1'; Mané 23', 66'; Salah 45+1', 83' | Report | | Stadium: Anfield; Attendance: 53,249; Referee: Kevin Friend |

| 5 May 2019 37 | Huddersfield Town | 1–1 | Manchester United | Huddersfield |
| 14:00 BST | Mbenza 60'; Lössl (yellow card) 90+4' | Report | McTominay 8'; Jones (yellow card) 33' | Stadium: John Smith's Stadium; Attendance: 24,263; Referee: Lee Mason |

| 12 May 2019 38 | Southampton | 1–1 | Huddersfield Town | Southampton |
| 15:00 BST | Redmond 41' | Report | Pritchard 55'; Hogg (yellow card) 84' | Stadium: St Mary's Stadium; Attendance: 30,367; Referee: Lee Probert |

=== FA Cup ===
The third round draw was made live on BBC by Ruud Gullit and Paul Ince from Stamford Bridge on 3 December 2018.

| 5 January 2019 Third round | Bristol City | 1–0 | Huddersfield Town | Bristol |
| 17:30 GMT | Brownhill 72' | Report | | Stadium: Ashton Gate Stadium; Attendance: 12,179; Referee: Peter Bankes |

=== EFL Cup ===
The second-round draw was made from the Stadium of Light on 16 August.

| 28 August 2018 Second round | Stoke City | 2–0 | Huddersfield Town | Stoke-on-Trent |
| 20:00 BST | Berahino 53'; Adam (yellow card) 90+7'; Bacuna 90+7' (o.g.) | Report | Bacuna (yellow card) 61' | Stadium: Bet365 Stadium; Attendance: 7,290; Referee: Peter Bankes |

== Squad statistics ==
| No. | Pos. | Name | League | | FA Cup | | EFL Cup | | Total | | Discipline | |
| No. | Pos. | Name | Apps | Goals | Apps | Goals | Apps | Goals | Apps | Goals | Yellow card | Red card |
|---|---|---|---|---|---|---|---|---|---|---|---|---|
| 1 | GK | (Denmark) Jonas Lössl | 30+1 | 0 | 0 | 0 | 1 | 0 | 31+1 | 0 | 0 | 0 |
| 2 | DF | (England) Tommy Smith | 13+2 | 0 | 0 | 0 | 1 | 0 | 14+2 | 0 | 2 | 1 |
| 5 | DF | (Netherlands) Terence Kongolo | 32 | 1 | 0 | 0 | 0 | 0 | 32 | 1 | 4 | 0 |
| 6 | MF | (England) Jonathan Hogg | 29 | 0 | 1 | 0 | 0 | 0 | 30 | 0 | 8 | 1 |
| 7 | MF | (Curaçao) Juninho Bacuna | 17+5 | 1 | 1 | 0 | 1 | 0 | 19+5 | 1 | 5 | 0 |
| 8 | MF | (Denmark) Philip Billing | 25+2 | 2 | 0 | 0 | 0 | 0 | 25+2 | 2 | 7 | 0 |
| 9 | FW | (Democratic Republic of the Congo) Elias Kachunga | 13+7 | 0 | 1 | 0 | 1 | 0 | 15+7 | 0 | 2 | 0 |
| 10 | MF | (Australia) Aaron Mooy | 25+4 | 3 | 0 | 0 | 0+1 | 0 | 25+5 | 3 | 4 | 0 |
| 11 | FW | (France) Adama Diakhaby | 6+6 | 0 | 1 | 0 | 0 | 0 | 7+6 | 0 | 1 | 0 |
| 12 | GK | (England) Ben Hamer | 7 | 0 | 1 | 0 | 0 | 0 | 8 | 0 | 0 | 0 |
| 13 | GK | (England) Joel Coleman | 1 | 0 | 0 | 0 | 0 | 0 | 1 | 0 | 0 | 0 |
| 14 | MF | (Egypt) Ramadan Sobhi | 0+4 | 0 | 0 | 0 | 0 | 0 | 0+4 | 0 | 0 | 0 |
| 15 | DF | (Germany) Chris Löwe | 23+6 | 0 | 1 | 0 | 0+1 | 0 | 24+7 | 0 | 2 | 0 |
| 16 | FW | (England) Karlan Grant | 9+4 | 4 | 0 | 0 | 0 | 0 | 9+4 | 4 | 0 | 0 |
| 17 | MF | (Netherlands) Rajiv van La Parra | 5 | 0 | 0 | 0 | 0 | 0 | 5 | 0 | 0 | 0 |
| 18 | FW | (Belgium) Isaac Mbenza | 10+12 | 1 | 0+1 | 0 | 1 | 0 | 11+13 | 1 | 1 | 0 |
| 19 | MF | (United States) Danny Williams | 1+4 | 0 | 0 | 0 | 1 | 0 | 2+4 | 0 | 1 | 0 |
| 20 | FW | (Belgium) Laurent Depoitre | 10+13 | 0 | 1 | 0 | 1 | 0 | 12+13 | 0 | 1 | 0 |
| 21 | MF | (England) Alex Pritchard | 26+4 | 2 | 0+1 | 0 | 0+1 | 0 | 26+6 | 2 | 2 | 0 |
| 23 | FW | (Germany) Collin Quaner | 0+2 | 0 | 0 | 0 | 0 | 0 | 0+2 | 0 | 0 | 0 |
| 24 | FW | (Benin) Steve Mounié | 19+12 | 2 | 0+1 | 0 | 0 | 0 | 19+13 | 2 | 1 | 1 |
| 25 | DF | (Denmark) Mathias Jørgensen | 24 | 3 | 1 | 0 | 0 | 0 | 25 | 3 | 6 | 0 |
| 26 | DF | (Germany) Christopher Schindler | 37 | 1 | 0 | 0 | 1 | 0 | 38 | 1 | 4 | 1 |
| 27 | DF | (Slovenia) Jon Gorenc Stanković | 9+2 | 1 | 1 | 0 | 1 | 0 | 11+2 | 1 | 2 | 0 |
| 29 | MF | (Germany) Abdelhamid Sabiri | 1+1 | 0 | 0 | 0 | 1 | 0 | 2+1 | 0 | 0 | 0 |
| 33 | DF | (Kosovo) Florent Hadergjonaj | 18+5 | 0 | 0 | 0 | 0 | 0 | 18+5 | 0 | 1 | 0 |
| 37 | DF | (Germany) Erik Durm | 21+7 | 0 | 1 | 0 | 1 | 0 | 23+7 | 0 | 0 | 0 |
| 38 | DF | (England) Demeaco Duhaney | 1 | 0 | 0 | 0 | 0 | 0 | 1 | 0 | 0 | 0 |
| 41 | MF | (England) Matty Daly | 0+2 | 0 | 0 | 0 | 0 | 0 | 0+2 | 0 | 0 | 0 |
| 42 | MF | (England) Jason Puncheon | 5+1 | 0 | 1 | 0 | 0 | 0 | 6+1 | 0 | 1 | 0 |
| 44 | MF | (England) Aaron Rowe | 1+1 | 0 | 0 | 0 | 0 | 0 | 1+1 | 0 | 0 | 0 |
| — | — | Own goals | – | 1 | – | 0 | – | 0 | – | 1 | – | – |

== Awards ==
=== Huddersfield Town Blue & White Foundation Player of the Month Award ===
Awarded monthly to the player that was chosen by members of the Blue & White Foundation voting on htafc.com

| Month | Player | Votes |
|---|---|---|
| August | (Netherlands) Terence Kongolo | |
| September | (Denmark) Philip Billing | |
| October | (Germany) Chris Löwe | |
| November | (Australia) Aaron Mooy | |
| December | (Denmark) Philip Billing | |
| January | (England) Jonathan Hogg | |
| February | (Denmark) Jonas Lössl | |
| March | (England) Karlan Grant | |
| Season | (Germany) Christopher Schindler | |
