= Demeaco Duhaney =

English footballer (born 1998)

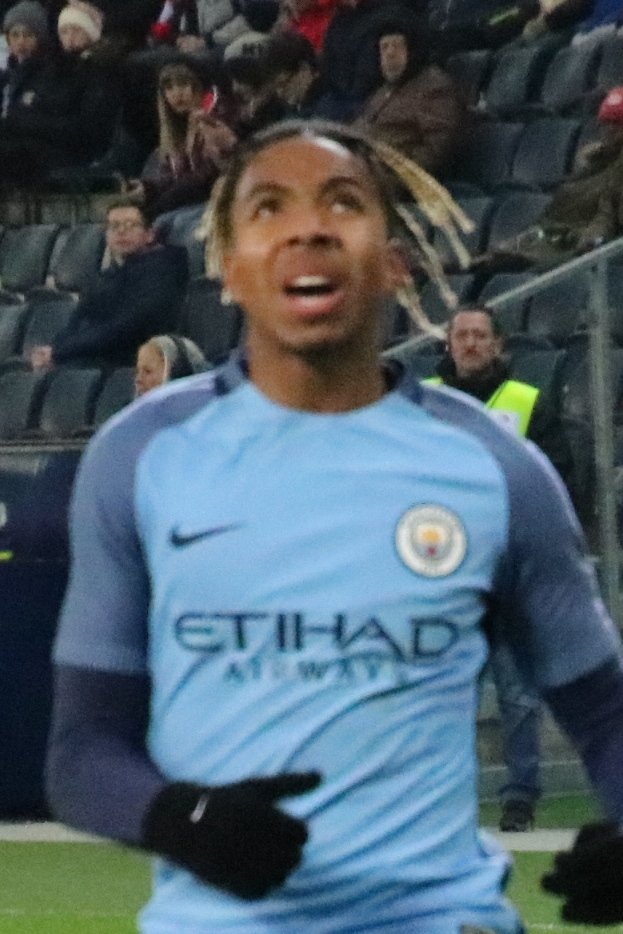
- Duhaney playing in the UEFA Youth League for Manchester City in February 2017

Personal information
- Full name: Demeaco D'Vaughn Duhaney
- Date of birth: 13 October 1998 (age 28)
- Place of birth: Manchester, England
- Height: 1.80 m (5 ft 11 in)
- Position: Right back

Team information
- Current team: İstanbulspor
- Number: 21

Youth career
- 2006–2018: Manchester City
- 2018–2019: Huddersfield Town

Senior career*
Years	Team	Apps	(Gls)
2019–2021	Huddersfield Town	20	(0)
2019	→ Boston United (loan)	5	(0)
2021–2023	Stoke City	3	(0)
2022–2023	→ İstanbulspor (loan)	18	(1)
2023–	İstanbulspor	71	(3)

International career^{‡}
2017	England U20	2	(0)
- * Club domestic league appearances and goals as of 6 May 2026 ‡ National team caps and goals as of 12:24, 2 January 2019 (UTC)

Demeaco D'Vaughn Duhaney (born 13 October 1998) is an English professional footballer who plays as a right back for TFF 1. Lig club İstanbulspor.

Duhaney began his career at Manchester City before signing for Huddersfield Town in 2019, and spent time on loan at Boston United. He has represented England at under-20 youth international level.

== Club career ==
=== Manchester City ===
Duhaney is from Fallowfield in Manchester, and joined the Manchester City academy at the age of five. He played regularly for the side that reached the 2017 FA Youth Cup Final, as well as featuring consistently in the UEFA Youth League and Premier League 2 for City's Under-23 side. He made three appearances for the club's under-21 side in the EFL Trophy during the 2017–18 season.

=== Huddersfield Town ===
On 17 August 2018, he joined Premier League club Huddersfield Town on a free transfer, agreeing a deal until June 2020. Due to the suspension of regular right-back Tommy Smith, Duhaney made his senior début on 26 February 2019, in a home Premier League victory against Wolverhampton Wanderers. He was substituted at half-time due to potential injury problems, and his performance in the game was praised by manager Jan Siewert.

He joined National League North side Boston United on loan in October 2019, but was recalled in December 2019, after playing seven matches.

Duhaney made six first-team appearances for Huddersfield Town in 2019, including four starts. Huddersfield triggered a one-year contract extension for Duhaney at the end of the 2019–20 season.

He was released by Huddersfield at the end of the 2020–21 season.

=== Stoke City ===
In August 2021 he signed a short-term contract with Stoke City until January 2022 following a successful trial period. Duhaney signed a new 18-month contract with Stoke in January 2022.

=== İstanbulspor ===
On 9 September 2022, Duhaney joined Turkish side İstanbulspor on loan for the remainder of the 2022–23 season. Duhaney scored his first senior league goal for Istanbulspor, in a 3-0 win against Sivasspor on 13 March 2023. He was released by Stoke at the end of the 2022–23 season.

On 24 July 2023, he signed a 4-year contract with İstanbulspor, to make his move permanent.

== International career ==
Duhaney appeared on the bench for England Under-18s once, and made two appearances for the under-20 side while with Manchester City, playing in the 2017–18 Under 20 Elite League.

== Career statistics ==
As of match played 12 March 2022

Appearances and goals by club, season and competition
Club	Season	League			FA Cup		League Cup		Other		Total	
Club	Season	Division	Apps	Goals	Apps	Goals	Apps	Goals	Apps	Goals	Apps	Goals
Manchester City U21	2017–18	—			—		—		3 (Note: Appearances in the EFL Trophy)	0	3	0
Huddersfield Town	2018–19	Premier League	1	0	0	0	0	0	—		1	0
Huddersfield Town	2019–20	Championship	6	0	0	0	0	0	—		6	0
Huddersfield Town	2020–21	Championship	13	0	1	0	0	0	—		14	0
Huddersfield Town	Total		20	0	1	0	0	0	0	0	21	0
Boston United (loan)	2019–20	National League North	5	0	2	0	0	0	—		7	0
Stoke City	2021–22	Championship	3	0	1	0	2	0	—		6	0
Stoke City	2022–23	Championship	0	0	0	0	0	0	—		0	0
Stoke City	Total		3	0	1	0	2	0	—		6	0
İstanbulspor (loan)	2022–23	Süper Lig	0	0	0	0	—		—		0	0
Career total			28	0	4	0	2	0	3	0	37	0
