= 2018–19 Premier League =

Football season in England

Premier League
- Season: 2018–19
- Dates: 10 August 2018 – 12 May 2019
- Champions: Manchester City; 4th Premier League title 6th English title
- Relegated: Cardiff City; Fulham; Huddersfield Town
- Champions League: Manchester City; Liverpool; Chelsea; Tottenham Hotspur
- Europa League: Arsenal; Manchester United; Wolverhampton Wanderers
- Matches: 380
- Goals: 1,072 (2.82 per match)
- Top goalscorer: Pierre-Emerick Aubameyang; Sadio Mané; Mohamed Salah (22 goals each)
- Best goalkeeper: Alisson (21 clean sheets)
- Biggest home win: Manchester City 6–0 Chelsea (10 February 2019)
- Biggest away win: Cardiff City 0–5 Manchester City (22 September 2018); Brighton & Hove Albion 0–5 Bournemouth (13 April 2019)
- Highest scoring: Everton 2–6 Tottenham Hotspur (23 December 2018); Crystal Palace 5–3 Bournemouth (12 May 2019)
- Longest winning run: 14 matches Manchester City
- Longest unbeaten run: 20 matches Liverpool
- Longest winless run: 14 matches Huddersfield Town
- Longest losing run: 9 matches Fulham
- Highest attendance: 81,332; Tottenham Hotspur 1–1 Arsenal (2 March 2019)
- Lowest attendance: 9,980; Bournemouth 2–1 Huddersfield Town (4 December 2018)
- Total attendance: 14,508,981
- Average attendance: 38,182

F

The 2018–19 Premier League was the 27th season of the Premier League, the top English professional league for association football clubs, since its establishment in 1992, and the 120th season of top-flight English football overall. The season started on 10 August 2018 and concluded on 12 May 2019. Fixtures for the 2018–19 season were announced on 14 June 2018. The league was contested by the top 17 teams from the 2017–18 season as well as Wolverhampton Wanderers, Cardiff City and Fulham, who joined as the promoted clubs from the 2017–18 EFL Championship. They replaced West Bromwich Albion, Swansea City and Stoke City who were relegated to the 2018–19 EFL Championship.

Manchester City were the defending champions, and they won their fourth Premier League title, and sixth English top-flight title overall, retaining the title on the last day of the season with 98 points after winning their last 14 league games. Liverpool finished second with 97 points – the highest total in English top-flight history for a second-placed team.

== Summary ==
Manchester City claimed the league title on the last day of the season with a 4–1 win at Brighton & Hove Albion, finishing on 98 points after a run of 14 straight wins. Liverpool held a 7-point lead over Manchester City on 3 January, but finished runners-up with 97 points – the fourth highest total in Premier League history and the highest in English top-flight history for a second-placed team, having lost only one league match all season – to eventual champions City.

Chelsea and Tottenham Hotspur claimed the other two Champions League berths, finishing in third and fourth place respectively. Tottenham were in third place for much of the season and were considered potential title challengers until a 1–2 loss to Burnley in February. Chelsea would go on to win the season's UEFA Europa League, defeating Arsenal in the final 4–1. Arsenal had gone on a fourteen-game unbeaten run near the start of the season and began April in third place, but a run of four points in six matches saw them drop to fifth place, finishing outside of the Champions League spots.

Manchester United's worst start to the season for 28 years and 3–1 loss to Liverpool led to the sacking of manager José Mourinho in December, with former player Ole Gunnar Solskjær replacing him, initially as a caretaker. Solskjær was appointed permanently after an impressive run of results which culminated in United's away goals victory over Paris Saint-Germain in the UEFA Champions League, but the team's poor form soon returned, and they eventually finished sixth after the team had won none of their final five league matches. Newly promoted Wolverhampton Wanderers achieved their highest finish since 1980 by finishing seventh, having taken points off every team in the league except Liverpool and Huddersfield Town. Their seventh-place finish was the highest for a newly promoted team since Ipswich Town finished 5th in the 2000–01 season.

Huddersfield were the first team to be relegated, following their 0–2 defeat at Crystal Palace on 30 March 2019, coinciding with victories for Burnley and Southampton. They were relegated with six games remaining. This made Huddersfield the second team in Premier League history to be relegated before March ended, following Derby County in 2007–08. Fulham joined them after a 1–4 defeat at Watford on 2 April, relegated with five games remaining. Cardiff City were the final team to be relegated following a 2–3 loss at home to Crystal Palace on 4 May with one game remaining.

The fastest goal in Premier League history was scored this season on 23 April by Shane Long in a 1–1 draw between his side Southampton and Watford after 7.69 seconds. On 4 May 2019, Fulham's Harvey Elliott became the youngest ever Premier League player at 16 years and 30 days. Tottenham Hotspur had a run of 28 games without a draw (20 wins, 8 losses), the longest ever recorded from the start of a Premier League season. Manchester City finished the season without a draw in any of their final 30 matches.

The season saw two aviation incidents involving Premier League personnel. On 27 October 2018, Leicester City owner Vichai Srivaddhanaprabha was killed in a helicopter crash outside the King Power Stadium, shortly after a 1–1 home draw against West Ham United. Almost three months later, on 21 January 2019, Cardiff City player Emiliano Sala, en route to join the club following his record signing from Nantes, died on board a Piper PA-46 Malibu aircraft that crashed off Alderney.

== Teams ==
Twenty teams competed in the league – the top seventeen teams from the previous season and the three teams promoted from the Championship. The promoted teams were Wolverhampton Wanderers (returning after a six-year absence), Cardiff City and Fulham (both teams returning after a four-year absence). They replaced Swansea City, Stoke City and West Bromwich Albion, who were relegated to the Championship after their top flight spells of seven, ten and eight years respectively.

=== Stadia and locations ===
Locations of the 2018–19 Premier League teams
Greater London Premier League football clubs

Note: Table lists in alphabetical order.

Team	Location	Stadium	Capacity
Arsenal	London (Holloway)	Emirates Stadium	60,260
Bournemouth	Bournemouth	Dean Court	11,329
Brighton & Hove Albion	Falmer	Falmer Stadium	30,666
Burnley	Burnley	Turf Moor	21,944
Cardiff City	Cardiff	Cardiff City Stadium	33,316
Chelsea	London (Fulham)	Stamford Bridge	40,853
Crystal Palace	London (Selhurst)	Selhurst Park	26,074
Everton	Liverpool (Walton)	Goodison Park	39,221
Fulham	London (Fulham)	Craven Cottage	25,700
Huddersfield Town	Huddersfield	Kirklees Stadium	24,121
Leicester City	Leicester	King Power Stadium	32,273
Liverpool	Liverpool (Anfield)	Anfield	53,394
Manchester City	Manchester (Bradford)	City of Manchester Stadium	55,017
Manchester United	Manchester (Old Trafford)	Old Trafford	74,879
Newcastle United	Newcastle upon Tyne	St James' Park	52,354
Southampton	Southampton	St Mary's Stadium	32,384
Tottenham Hotspur	London (Wembley)	Wembley Stadium (Note: Tottenham Hotspur were due to play their first three home games at Wembley due to the rebuilding of their own stadium, but delays in the construction process meant Tottenham did not play their first match there until 3 April 2019.)	90,000 (Note: Capacity was restricted to 51,000 between December and 10 February, though they hosted Manchester United on 13 January at full capacity. They also hosted Arsenal on 2 March with full capacity.)
Tottenham Hotspur	London (Tottenham)	Tottenham Hotspur Stadium	62,062
Watford	Watford	Vicarage Road	20,400
West Ham United	London (Stratford)	London Stadium	60,000
Wolverhampton Wanderers	Wolverhampton	Molineux Stadium	32,050

=== Personnel and kits ===
Team	Manager	Captain	Kit manufacturer	Shirt sponsor (chest)	Shirt sponsor (sleeve)
Arsenal	(Spain) Unai Emery	(France) Laurent Koscielny	Puma	Fly Emirates	Visit Rwanda
Bournemouth	(England) Eddie Howe	(England) Simon Francis	Umbro	M88	Mansion Group
Brighton & Hove Albion	(Republic of Ireland) Chris Hughton	(Spain) Bruno	Nike	American Express	JD
Burnley	(England) Sean Dyche	(England) Tom Heaton	Puma	LaBa360	AstroPay
Cardiff City	(England) Neil Warnock	(England) Sean Morrison	Adidas	Tourism Malaysia	JD
Chelsea	(Italy) Maurizio Sarri	(England) Gary Cahill	Nike	Yokohama Tyres	Hyundai
Crystal Palace	(England) Roy Hodgson	(Serbia) Luka Milivojević	Puma	ManBetX	Dongqiudi
Everton	(Portugal) Marco Silva	(England) Phil Jagielka	Umbro	SportPesa	Angry Birds
Fulham	(England) Scott Parker	(Scotland) Tom Cairney	Adidas	Dafabet	ICM
Huddesfield Town	(Germany) Jan Siewert	(England) Tommy Smith	Umbro	OPE Sports	Leisu Sports
Leicester City	(Northern Ireland) Brendan Rodgers	(Jamaica) Wes Morgan	Adidas	King Power	Bia Saigon
Liverpool	(Germany) Jürgen Klopp	(England) Jordan Henderson	New Balance	Standard Chartered	Western Union
Manchester City	(Spain) Pep Guardiola	(Belgium) Vincent Kompany	Nike	Etihad Airways	Nexen Tire
Manchester United	(Norway) Ole Gunnar Solskjær	(Ecuador) Antonio Valencia	Adidas	Chevrolet	Kohler
Newcastle United	(Spain) Rafael Benítez	(England) Jamaal Lascelles	Puma	Fun88	–
Southampton	(Austria) Ralph Hasenhüttl	(Denmark) Pierre-Emile Højbjerg (Note: Captain Steven Davis left on loan to Rangers in January effectively making Højbjerg captain for the remainder of the season.)	Under Armour	Virgin Media	
Tottenham Hotspur	(Argentina) Mauricio Pochettino	(France) Hugo Lloris	Nike	AIA	
Watford	(Spain) Javi Gracia	(England) Troy Deeney	Adidas	FxPro	MoPlay
West Ham United	(Chile) Manuel Pellegrini	(England) Mark Noble	Umbro	Betway	Basset & Gold
Wolverhampton Wanderers	(Portugal) Nuno Espírito Santo	(England) Conor Coady	Adidas	W88	CoinDeal

Match balls supplied by Nike, this season's version is the Merlin.

=== Managerial changes ===
Team	Outgoing manager	Manner of departure	Date of vacancy	Position in table	Incoming manager	Date of appointment
Arsenal	(France) Arsène Wenger	Retired	13 May 2018	Pre-season	(Spain) Unai Emery	23 May 2018
Everton	(England) Sam Allardyce	Sacked	16 May 2018	Pre-season	(Portugal) Marco Silva	31 May 2018
West Ham United	(Scotland) David Moyes	End of contract	16 May 2018	Pre-season	(Chile) Manuel Pellegrini	22 May 2018
Chelsea	(Italy) Antonio Conte	Sacked	13 July 2018	Pre-season	(Italy) Maurizio Sarri	14 July 2018
Fulham	(Serbia) Slaviša Jokanović	Sacked	14 November 2018	20th	(Italy) Claudio Ranieri	14 November 2018
Southampton	(Wales) Mark Hughes	Sacked	3 December 2018	18th	(Austria) Ralph Hasenhüttl	5 December 2018
Manchester United	(Portugal) José Mourinho	Sacked	18 December 2018	6th	(Norway) Ole Gunnar Solskjær (Note: Solskjær was initially appointed as caretaker manager until the end of the season, but the move was made permanent on 28 March 2019.)	19 December 2018
Huddersfield Town	(United States) David Wagner	Mutual consent	14 January 2019	20th	(Germany) Jan Siewert	21 January 2019
Leicester City	(France) Claude Puel	Sacked	24 February 2019	12th	(Northern Ireland) Brendan Rodgers	26 February 2019
Fulham	(Italy) Claudio Ranieri	Sacked	28 February 2019	19th	(England) Scott Parker (Note: Parker was initially appointed as caretaker manager, but the move was made permanent on 10 May 2019.)	28 February 2019

== League table ==
Pos	Team	Pld	W	D	L	GF	GA	GD	Pts	Qualification or relegation
1	Manchester City (C)	38	32	2	4	95	23	+72	98	Qualification to Champions League group stage
2	Liverpool	38	30	7	1	89	22	+67	97	Qualification to Champions League group stage
3	Chelsea	38	21	9	8	63	39	+24	72	Qualification to Champions League group stage
4	Tottenham Hotspur	38	23	2	13	67	39	+28	71	Qualification to Champions League group stage
5	Arsenal	38	21	7	10	73	51	+22	70	Qualification to Europa League group stage (Note: Since the winners of the EFL Cup and the FA Cup, Manchester City, qualified for the Champions League, the spot given to the FA Cup winners (Europa League group stage) was passed to the sixth-placed team and the spot given to the League Cup winners (Europa League second qualifying round) was passed to the seventh-placed team.)
6	Manchester United	38	19	9	10	65	54	+11	66	Qualification to Europa League group stage
7	Wolverhampton Wanderers	38	16	9	13	47	46	+1	57	Qualification to Europa League second qualifying round
8	Everton	38	15	9	14	54	46	+8	54	
9	Leicester City	38	15	7	16	51	48	+3	52	
10	West Ham United	38	15	7	16	52	55	−3	52	
11	Watford	38	14	8	16	52	59	−7	50	
12	Crystal Palace	38	14	7	17	51	53	−2	49	
13	Newcastle United	38	12	9	17	42	48	−6	45	
14	Bournemouth	38	13	6	19	56	70	−14	45	
15	Burnley	38	11	7	20	45	68	−23	40	
16	Southampton	38	9	12	17	45	65	−20	39	
17	Brighton & Hove Albion	38	9	9	20	35	60	−25	36	
18	Cardiff City (R)	38	10	4	24	34	69	−35	34	Relegation to EFL Championship
19	Fulham (R)	38	7	5	26	34	81	−47	26	Relegation to EFL Championship
20	Huddersfield Town (R)	38	3	7	28	22	76	−54	16	Relegation to EFL Championship

Source: Premier League
Rules for classification: 1) Points; 2) Goal difference; 3) Goals scored; 4) Play-offs (only if needed to decide champion, teams for relegation or teams for UEFA competitions).
(C) Champions; (R) Relegated

== Results ==
Home \ Away	ARS	BOU	BHA	BUR	CAR	CHE	CRY	EVE	FUL	HUD	LEI	LIV	MCI	MUN	NEW	SOU	TOT	WAT	WHU	WOL
Arsenal	—	5–1	1–1	3–1	2–1	2–0	2–3	2–0	4–1	1–0	3–1	1–1	0–2	2–0	2–0	2–0	4–2	2–0	3–1	1–1
Bournemouth	1–2	—	2–0	1–3	2–0	4–0	2–1	2–2	0–1	2–1	4–2	0–4	0–1	1–2	2–2	0–0	1–0	3–3	2–0	1–1
Brighton & Hove Albion	1–1	0–5	—	1–3	0–2	1–2	3–1	1–0	2–2	1–0	1–1	0–1	1–4	3–2	1–1	0–1	1–2	0–0	1–0	1–0
Burnley	1–3	4–0	1–0	—	2–0	0–4	1–3	1–5	2–1	1–1	1–2	1–3	0–1	0–2	1–2	1–1	2–1	1–3	2–0	2–0
Cardiff City	2–3	2–0	2–1	1–2	—	1–2	2–3	0–3	4–2	0–0	0–1	0–2	0–5	1–5	0–0	1–0	0–3	1–5	2–0	2–1
Chelsea	3–2	2–0	3–0	2–2	4–1	—	3–1	0–0	2–0	5–0	0–1	1–1	2–0	2–2	2–1	0–0	2–0	3–0	2–0	1–1
Crystal Palace	2–2	5–3	1–2	2–0	0–0	0–1	—	0–0	2–0	2–0	1–0	0–2	1–3	1–3	0–0	0–2	0–1	1–2	1–1	0–1
Everton	1–0	2–0	3–1	2–0	1–0	2–0	2–0	—	3–0	1–1	0–1	0–0	0–2	4–0	1–1	2–1	2–6	2–2	1–3	1–3
Fulham	1–5	0–3	4–2	4–2	1–0	1–2	0–2	2–0	—	1–0	1–1	1–2	0–2	0–3	0–4	3–2	1–2	1–1	0–2	1–1
Huddersfield Town	1–2	0–2	1–2	1–2	0–0	0–3	0–1	0–1	1–0	—	1–4	0–1	0–3	1–1	0–1	1–3	0–2	1–2	1–1	1–0
Leicester City	3–0	2–0	2–1	0–0	0–1	0–0	1–4	1–2	3–1	3–1	—	1–2	2–1	0–1	0–1	1–2	0–2	2–0	1–1	2–0
Liverpool	5–1	3–0	1–0	4–2	4–1	2–0	4–3	1–0	2–0	5–0	1–1	—	0–0	3–1	4–0	3–0	2–1	5–0	4–0	2–0
Manchester City	3–1	3–1	2–0	5–0	2–0	6–0	2–3	3–1	3–0	6–1	1–0	2–1	—	3–1	2–1	6–1	1–0	3–1	1–0	3–0
Manchester United	2–2	4–1	2–1	2–2	0–2	1–1	0–0	2–1	4–1	3–1	2–1	0–0	0–2	—	3–2	3–2	0–3	2–1	2–1	1–1
Newcastle United	1–2	2–1	0–1	2–0	3–0	1–2	0–1	3–2	0–0	2–0	0–2	2–3	2–1	0–2	—	3–1	1–2	1–0	0–3	1–2
Southampton	3–2	3–3	2–2	0–0	1–2	0–3	1–1	2–1	2–0	1–1	1–2	1–3	1–3	2–2	0–0	—	2–1	1–1	1–2	3–1
Tottenham Hotspur	1–1	5–0	1–0	1–0	1–0	3–1	2–0	2–2	3–1	4–0	3–1	1–2	0–1	0–1	1–0	3–1	—	2–1	0–1	1–3
Watford	0–1	0–4	2–0	0–0	3–2	1–2	2–1	1–0	4–1	3–0	2–1	0–3	1–2	1–2	1–1	1–1	2–1	—	1–4	1–2
West Ham United	1–0	1–2	2–2	4–2	3–1	0–0	3–2	0–2	3–1	4–3	2–2	1–1	0–4	3–1	2–0	3–0	0–1	0–2	—	0–1
Wolverhampton Wanderers	3–1	2–0	0–0	1–0	2–0	2–1	0–2	2–2	1–0	0–2	4–3	0–2	1–1	2–1	1–1	2–0	2–3	0–2	3–0	—

Source: Premier League
Legend: Blue = home team win; Yellow = draw; Red = away team win.
For upcoming matches, an "a" indicates there is an article about the rivalry between the two participants.

== Season statistics ==
=== Scoring ===
==== Top scorers ====
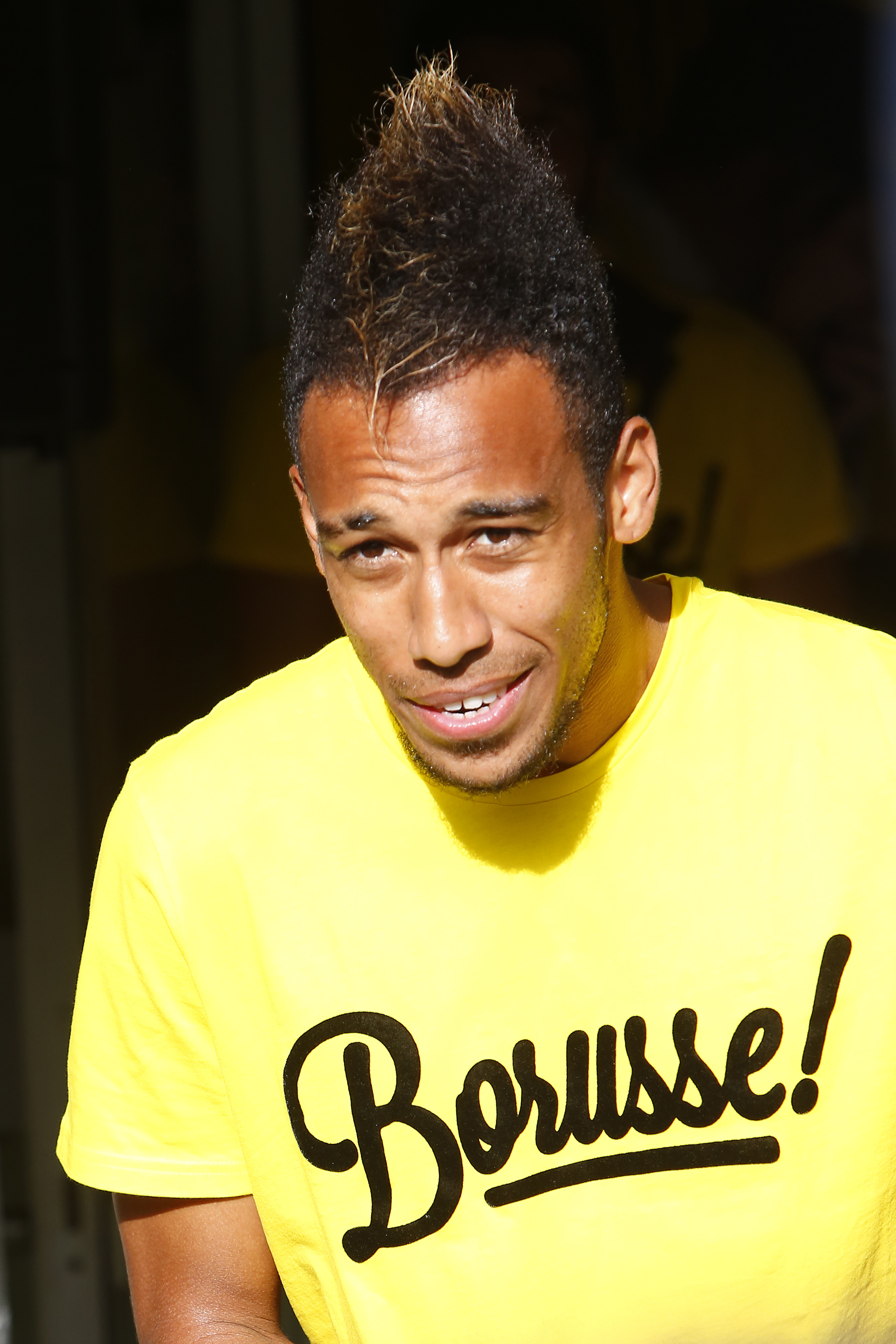
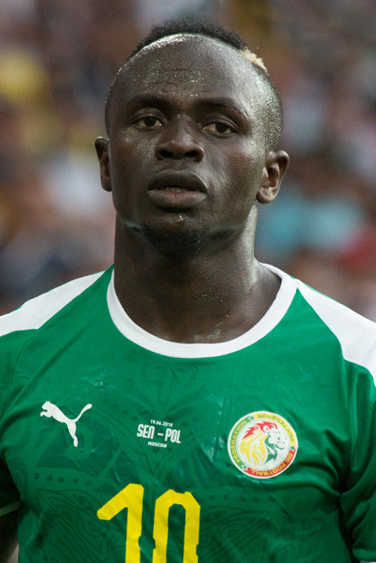
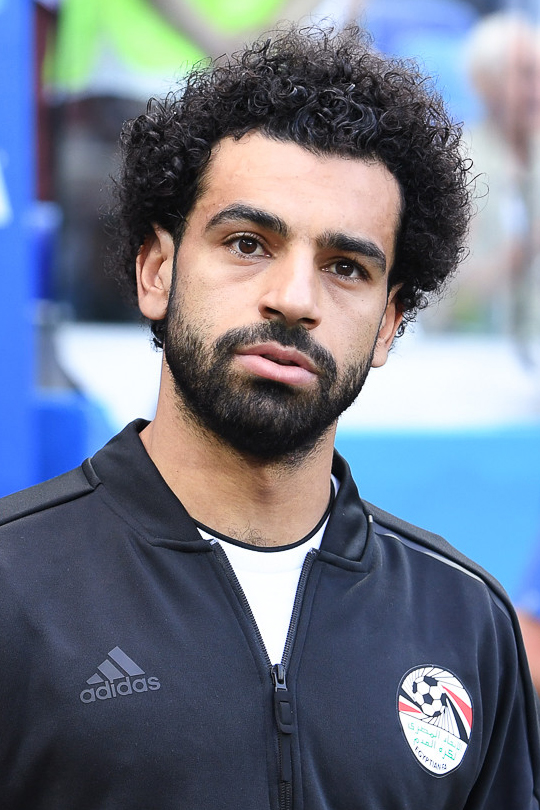
(L–R) Three African players shared the Premier League Golden Boot for 2018–19. Arsenal's Pierre-Emerick Aubameyang and Liverpool duo Sadio Mané and Mohamed Salah scored 22 goals each.

Rank	Player	Club	Goals
1	(Gabon) Pierre-Emerick Aubameyang	Arsenal	22
1	(Senegal) Sadio Mané	Liverpool	22
1	(Egypt) Mohamed Salah	Liverpool	22
4	(Argentina) Sergio Agüero	Manchester City	21
5	(England) Jamie Vardy	Leicester City	18
6	(England) Harry Kane	Tottenham Hotspur	17
6	(England) Raheem Sterling	Manchester City	17
8	(Belgium) Eden Hazard	Chelsea	16
9	(England) Callum Wilson	Bournemouth	14
10	(Mexico) Raúl Jiménez	Wolverhampton Wanderers	13
10	(France) Alexandre Lacazette	Arsenal	13
10	(England) Glenn Murray	Brighton & Hove Albion	13
10	(France) Paul Pogba	Manchester United	13
10	(Brazil) Richarlison	Everton	13
10	(Iceland) Gylfi Sigurðsson	Everton	13

==== Hat-tricks ====
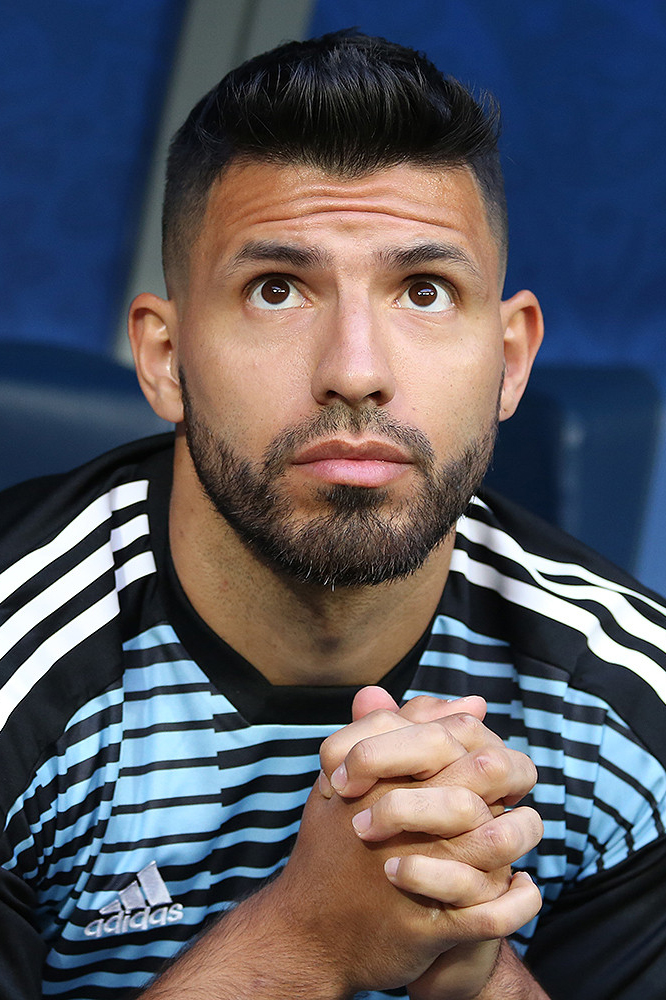
Sergio Agüero scored three hat-tricks this season, the most by a single player.

Player	For	Against	Result	Date	Ref
(Argentina) Sergio Agüero	Manchester City	Huddersfield Town	6–1 (H)	19 August 2018	
(Belgium) Eden Hazard	Chelsea	Cardiff City	4–1 (H)	15 September 2018	
(Egypt) Mohamed Salah	Liverpool	Bournemouth	4–0 (A)	8 December 2018	
(Brazil) Roberto Firmino	Liverpool	Arsenal	5–1 (H)	29 December 2018	
(Portugal) Diogo Jota	Wolverhampton Wanderers	Leicester City	4–3 (H)	19 January 2019	
(Argentina) Sergio Agüero	Manchester City	Arsenal	3–1 (H)	3 February 2019	
(Argentina) Sergio Agüero	Manchester City	Chelsea	6–0 (H)	10 February 2019	
(Spain) Gerard Deulofeu	Watford	Cardiff City	5–1 (A)	22 February 2019	
(England) Raheem Sterling	Manchester City	Watford	3–1 (H)	9 March 2019	
(Brazil) Lucas Moura	Tottenham Hotspur	Huddersfield Town	4–0 (H)	13 April 2019	
(Spain) Ayoze Pérez	Newcastle United	Southampton	3–1 (H)	20 April 2019	

Notes

(H) – Home team
(A) – Away team

=== Clean sheets ===
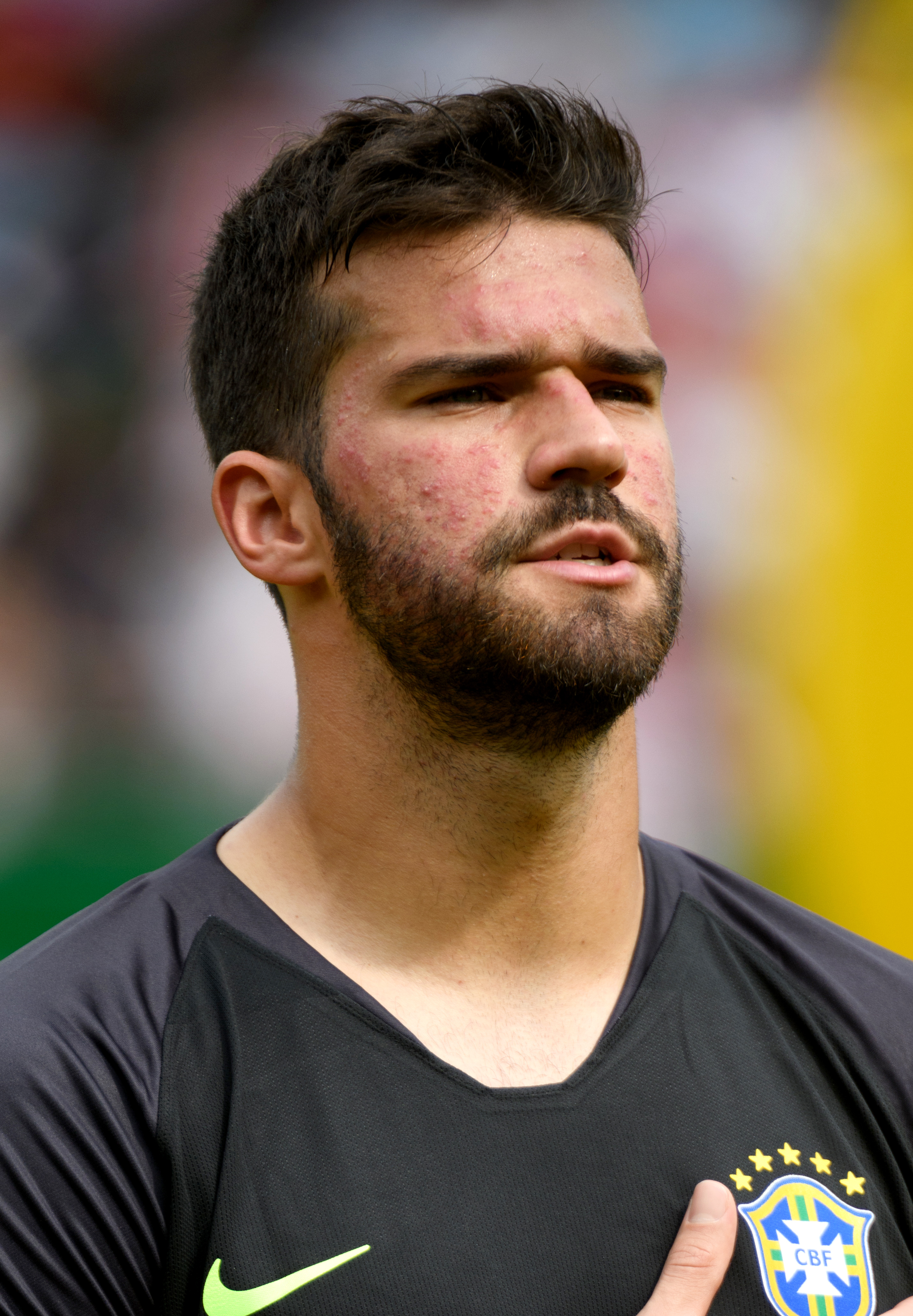
Alisson won the Premier League Golden Glove after keeping 21 clean sheets for Liverpool.

Rank	Player	Club	Clean sheets
1	(Brazil) Alisson	Liverpool	21
2	(Brazil) Ederson	Manchester City	20
3	(Spain) Kepa Arrizabalaga	Chelsea	14
3	(England) Jordan Pickford	Everton	14
5	(France) Hugo Lloris	Tottenham Hotspur	12
6	(Slovakia) Martin Dúbravka	Newcastle United	11
7	(Philippines) Neil Etheridge	Cardiff City	10
7	(Denmark) Kasper Schmeichel	Leicester City	10
9	(Spain) David de Gea	Manchester United	7
9	(Poland) Łukasz Fabiański	West Ham United	7
9	(England) Ben Foster	Watford	7
9	(Spain) Vicente Guaita	Crystal Palace	7
9	(Portugal) Rui Patrício	Wolverhampton Wanderers	7

=== Discipline ===
==== Player ====
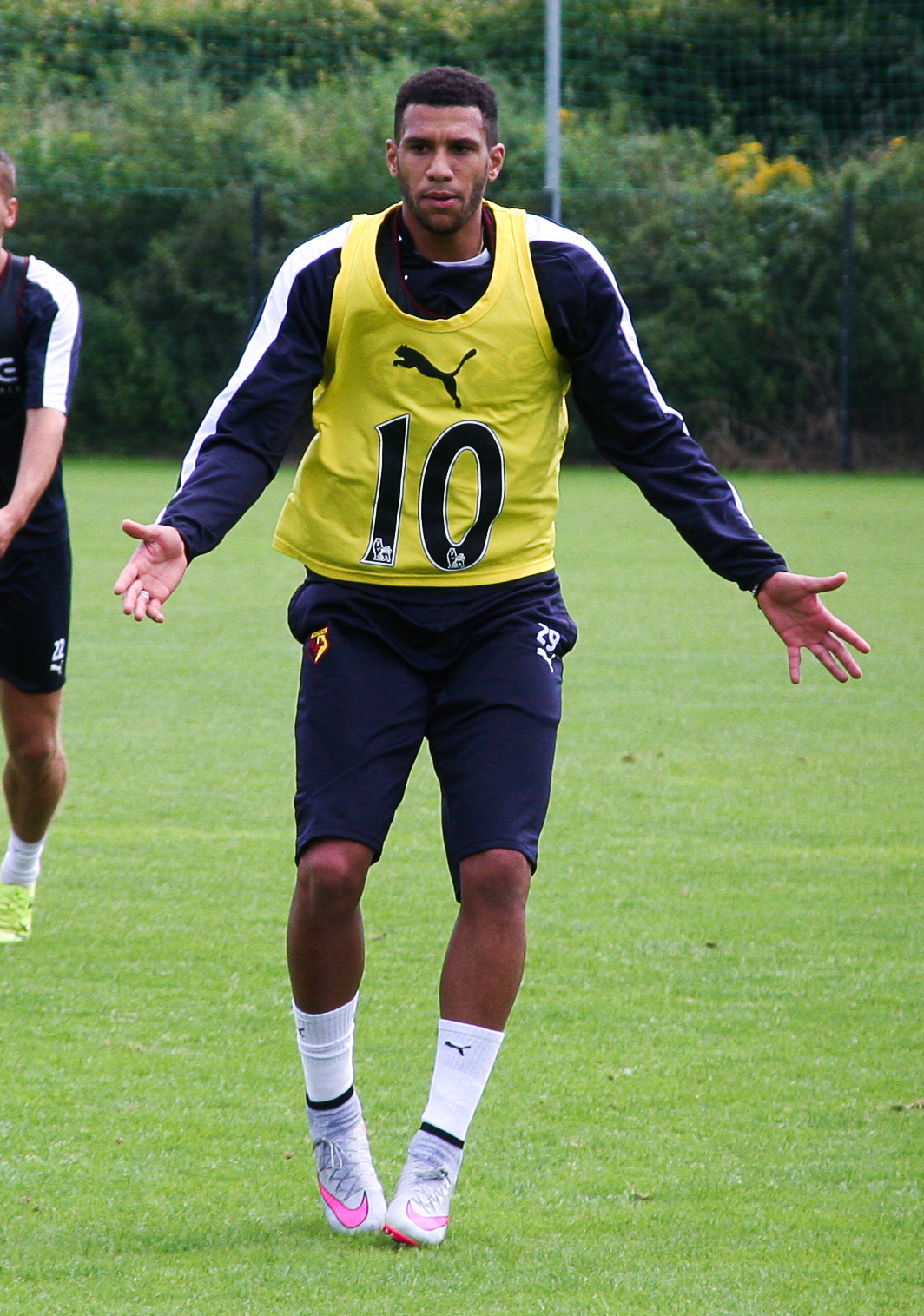
Étienne Capoue received the most yellow cards this season with 14.

- Most yellow cards: 14
  - (France) Étienne Capoue (Watford)
- Most red cards: 2
  - (Denmark) Pierre-Emile Højbjerg (Southampton)
  - (Jamaica) Wes Morgan (Leicester City)

==== Club ====
- Most yellow cards: 77
  - Watford
- Most red cards: 5
  - Leicester City

== Awards ==
=== Monthly awards ===
Month	Manager of the Month		Player of the Month		Goal of the Month		References
Month	Manager	Club	Player	Club	Player	Club	References
August	(Spain) Javi Gracia	Watford	(Brazil) Lucas Moura	Tottenham Hotspur	(Ivory Coast) Jean Michaël Seri	Fulham	
September	(Portugal) Nuno Espírito Santo	Wolverhampton Wanderers	(Belgium) Eden Hazard	Chelsea	(England) Daniel Sturridge	Liverpool	
October	(England) Eddie Howe	Bournemouth	(Gabon) Pierre-Emerick Aubameyang	Arsenal	(Wales) Aaron Ramsey	Arsenal	
November	(Spain) Rafael Benítez	Newcastle United	(England) Raheem Sterling	Manchester City	(South Korea) Son Heung-min	Tottenham Hotspur	
December	(Germany) Jürgen Klopp	Liverpool	(Netherlands) Virgil van Dijk	Liverpool	(England) Andros Townsend	Crystal Palace	
January	(Norway) Ole Gunnar Solskjær	Manchester United	(England) Marcus Rashford	Manchester United	(Germany) André Schürrle	Fulham	
February	(Spain) Pep Guardiola	Manchester City	(Argentina) Sergio Agüero	Manchester City	(Switzerland) Fabian Schär	Newcastle United	
March	(Germany) Jürgen Klopp	Liverpool	(Senegal) Sadio Mané	Liverpool	(France) Anthony Knockaert	Brighton & Hove Albion	
April	(Spain) Pep Guardiola	Manchester City	(England) Jamie Vardy	Leicester City	(Belgium) Eden Hazard	Chelsea	

=== Annual awards ===
Award	Winner	Club
Premier League Manager of the Season	(Spain) Pep Guardiola	Manchester City
Premier League Player of the Season	(Netherlands) Virgil van Dijk	Liverpool
Premier League Goal of the Season	(England) Andros Townsend	Crystal Palace
PFA Players' Player of the Year	(Netherlands) Virgil van Dijk	Liverpool
PFA Young Player of the Year	(England) Raheem Sterling	Manchester City
FWA Footballer of the Year	(England) Raheem Sterling	Manchester City
PFA Fans' Player of the Year	(Belgium) Eden Hazard	Chelsea

PFA Team of the Year
Goalkeeper	(Brazil) Ederson (Manchester City)			
Defenders	(England) Trent Alexander-Arnold (Liverpool)	(France) Aymeric Laporte (Manchester City)	(Netherlands) Virgil van Dijk (Liverpool)	(Scotland) Andy Robertson (Liverpool)
Midfielders	(Portugal) Bernardo Silva (Manchester City)		(Brazil) Fernandinho (Manchester City)	(France) Paul Pogba (Manchester United)
Forwards	(England) Raheem Sterling (Manchester City)		(Argentina) Sergio Agüero (Manchester City)	(Senegal) Sadio Mané (Liverpool)

== Attendances ==
Pos	Team	Total	High	Low	Average	Change
1	Manchester United	1,415,471	74,556	74,400	74,498	−0.6%
2	Arsenal	1,138,072	60,030	59,493	59,899	+1.0%
3	West Ham United	1,108,375	59,988	56,811	58,336	+2.6%
4	Tottenham Hotspur	1,030,111	81,332	29,164	54,216	−20.2%
5	Manchester City	1,028,477	54,511	53,307	54,130	+0.6%
6	Liverpool	1,006,668	53,373	50,965	52,983	−0.1%
7	Newcastle United	971,297	52,242	48,323	51,121	−1.7%
8	Chelsea	768,297	40,721	38,593	40,437	−2.0%
9	Everton	736,815	39,400	38,113	38,780	0.0%
10	Leicester City	605,161	32,149	30,558	31,851	+0.8%
11	Cardiff City	596,844	33,082	29,402	31,413	+55.8%^{1}
12	Wolverhampton Wanderers	589,572	31,436	30,130	31,030	+9.7%^{1}
13	Brighton & Hove Albion	578,085	30,682	29,323	30,426	+0.1%
14	Southampton	572,640	31,890	27,077	30,139	−2.1%
15	Crystal Palace	483,644	25,789	24,738	25,455	+1.6%
16	Fulham	463,051	25,401	22,008	24,371	+22.5%^{1}
17	Huddersfield Town	440,822	24,263	17,082	23,201	−3.5%
18	Burnley	390,148	21,741	18,497	20,534	−0.7%
19	Watford	380,297	20,540	17,301	20,016	−1.1%
20	Bournemouth	200,107	10,986	9,980	10,532	−1.0%
	League total	14,503,954	81,332	9,980	38,168	−0.3%

Updated to games played on 1 December 2019
Source: World Football
Notes:
1: Team played last season in the Championship
