= Terence Kongolo =

Dutch footballer (born 1994)

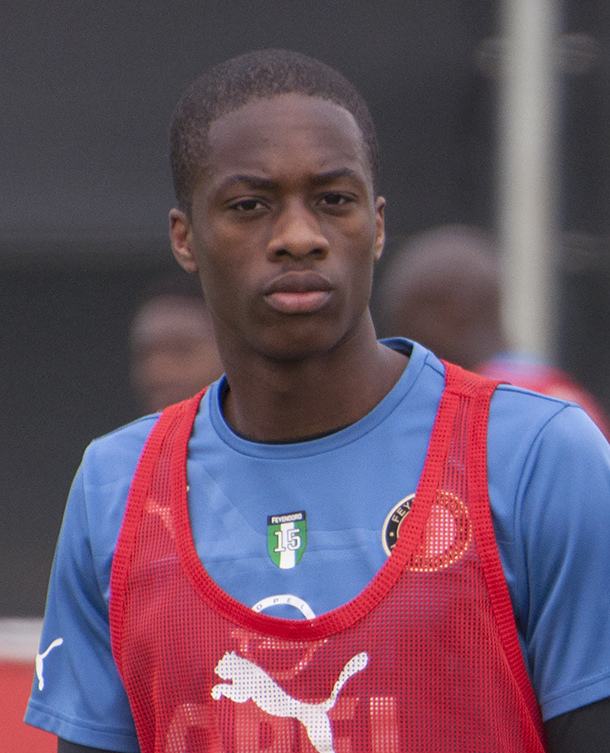
- Kongolo with Feyenoord in 2014

Personal information
- Full name: Terence Kongolo
- Date of birth: 14 February 1994 (age 32)
- Place of birth: Fribourg, Switzerland
- Height: 1.88 m (6 ft 2 in)
- Positions: Centre-back; left-back

Youth career
- 2002–2012: Feyenoord

Senior career*
Years	Team	Apps	(Gls)
2012–2017	Feyenoord	106	(1)
2017–2018	Monaco	15	(1)
2018	→ Huddersfield Town (loan)	13	(0)
2018–2020	Huddersfield Town	43	(1)
2020	→ Fulham (loan)	1	(0)
2020–2024	Fulham	1	(0)
2022–2023	→ Le Havre (loan)	14	(0)
2023–2024	→ Rapid Wien (loan)	12	(0)
2024–2026	NAC Breda	23	(0)
2026	FC Iberia 1999	1	(0)
Total		229	(3)

International career
2009	Netherlands U15	2	(0)
2009–2010	Netherlands U16	4	(1)
2010–2011	Netherlands U17	16	(2)
2011–2012	Netherlands U18	2	(0)
2012–2013	Netherlands U19	10	(0)
2013	Netherlands U20	1	(0)
2013–2015	Netherlands U21	6	(1)
2014–2018	Netherlands	4	(0)
Medal record
Men's football
Representing Netherlands
FIFA World Cup
Third place	2014
UEFA European Under-17 Championship
Winner	2011
- * Club domestic league appearances and goals

Terence Kongolo (born 14 February 1994) is a former professional footballer who played as a centre-back or left-back.

A product of the Feyenoord youth system, he made his Eredivisie debut for them during the 2011–12 season, remaining there until 2017, when he signed for AS Monaco.

He joined Huddersfield Town in January 2018, initially on loan, before rejoining them on a permanent transfer. When they were relegated from the Premier League in 2019, Kongolo joined Fulham on loan in January 2020, later making the deal permanent in October. After loan moves to Le Havre and Rapid Wien in 2022–23 and 2023–24 respectively, Kongolo departed Fulham in June 2024. In September, he returned to the Netherlands with NAC Breda. After a brief spell with FC Iberia 1899, he retired from football in 2026.

Born in Switzerland to Congolese parents, Kongolo was raised in the Netherlands and has represented the Netherlands national team at senior level. He was part of the Netherlands squad that finished third at the 2014 FIFA World Cup.

== Early life ==
Kongolo was born in Fribourg, Switzerland, to Congolese parents Editha and Erik; he moved to the Netherlands when he was four years old and, despite being raised in the Netherlands, he holds Swiss citizenship. He is the eldest of three children: he has two younger brothers: Rodney, born in 1998, and Fidel.

== Club career ==
=== Feyenoord ===
Kongolo joined Feyenoord as an 8-year old. After progressing through the ranks of under-16 and under-17 side, Kongolo then signed his first professional contract with the side in June 2010. A year later, he was promoted to the first team ahead of the 2011–12 season and appeared on the substitute bench, around the same time playing for the reserve side. It wasn't until on 14 April 2012 when he made his debut under manager Ronald Koeman, where he came on as a substitute, in 3–0 win over Excelsior. This turned out to be his only appearance of the season and at the end of the 2011–12 season, he signed a contract extension, keeping him until June 2015.

In the 2012–13 season, Kongolo then made his first league start on 24 August 2012 against Heracles Almelo following the injury of Stefan de Vrij and the suspension of both Joris Mathijsen and Bruno Martins Indi, where he played the whole game, in a 2–1 win. The following month, on 26 September 2012, he scored his first Feyenoord goal in the second round of the KNVB Cup, in a 3–2 win over NEC and scored again in the third round of KNVB Cup, in a 4–0 win over XerxesDZB on 1 November 2012. However, Kongolo received a red card after a second bookable, just 13 minutes after receiving a yellow card, in a 2–2 draw against Groningen on 7 October 2012. As the 2012–13 season, Kongolo suffered a knee injury that kept him out for most of the season and upon returning from injury, he played in the reserve for the rest of the season, scoring once against PSV Eindhoven U21 on 2 April 2013. At the end of the 2012–13 season, Kongolo went on to make five appearances for the first-team side.

At the start of the 2013–14 season, Kongolo didn't feature in the first team, as he spent the start of the season, on the reserve side. At the reserve side, he appeared nine times and captained the side on five occasions. It also saw Kongolo switch his shirt number from twenty-five to fifteen. His first appearance came on 29 September 2013 against ADO Den Haag, coming on as a second-half substitute, which saw them win 4–2. After continuously appearing in the reserve side and making two more league appearances by the end of the 2013, Kongolo was then given a handful of first team appearances as a centre-back for the rest of the season, dispatching from Joris Mathijsen. Despite suffering a minor hip injury against Go Ahead Eagles on 30 March 2014, Kongolo finished the 2013–14 season, making eighteen appearances in all competitions.

Ahead of the 2014–15 season, Kongolo's performance in the World Cup, despite playing once, attracted interests from clubs around Europe, but the club management remained confident of keeping him. On 28 July 2014, it was announced that Kongolo signed a three-year contract with the club, keeping him until 2017 and ending his transfer speculation. After appearing the first two league matches of the season, Kongolo was demoted to the substitute bench for two matches after losing his left-back position to youngster Miquel Nelom. Kongolo returned to the first team soon after when he started against Willem II, which they lost 2–1. From that moment on, Kongolo regained his first team place, mostly playing in the centre-back position, partnering with Sven van Beek, for most of the season. Kongolo then set up one of the two goals, in a 2–0 win over PEC Zwolle on 1 November 2014. Despite suffering from a groin injury, Kongolo finished the 2014–15 season, making forty-five appearances in all competitions.

In the 2015–16 season, Kongolo switched number shirt again when he switched from number five to four this time following the retirement of Joris Mathijsen from club football. Kongolo established himself in the first team as the left-back position and started the season well when he set up one of the goals, in a 2–0 win over Vitesse on 23 September 2015. Since the start of the season, Kongolo was ever-present in the first team until he was suspended for one game for picking his fourth booking this season. After returning to the first team from suspension, Kongolo then signed a contract extension with the club, keeping him until 2018. However, as the 2015–16 season progressed, Kongolo suffered a hamstring injury during the match against Vitesse and was substituted as a result. After the match, it was announced that Kongolo would be out between four and six weeks. After returning to the first team, Kongolo started in the final of the KNVB Cup against Utrecht and although he was booked, leading to Ramon Leeuwin scoring an equaliser, Kongolo helped the side win the KNVB Cup with two goals to one. At the end of the 2015–16 season, Kongolo went on to make thirty-five appearances in all competitions.

Ahead of the 2016–17 season, Kongolo's performance began to attract interests from European clubs, such as, Sunderland, Hamburg and Bayer Leverkusen but stayed at the club throughout the summer. Kongolo continued to be a first team regular since the start of the 2016–17 season and was involved in the squad that saw Feyenoord make an impressive start, with 12 wins in the row. During their winning streak, he scored his first professional for the side, in a 5–0 win over Roda on 25 September 2016. Elsewhere in the UEFA Europa League, Kongolo helped Feyenoord keep two clean sheets against Manchester United and Zorya Luhansk, which saw him named as UEFA Team of the Week on Matchday 1 and Matchday 3. However, Kongolo suffered a hamstring injury that kept him out throughout November. After returning to the first team, Kongolo captained the club the first time in his professional career in the quarter-final of the KNVB Cup against Vitesse, which saw them lose 2–0. On 26 February 2017, Kongolo set up one of the goals, in a 2–1 win over PSV Eindhoven to continue their winning form. However, in a 1–0 loss against Sparta Rotterdam, on 5 March 2017, Kongolo suffered a thigh injury in the first half and was substituted as result. After weeks on the sidelines, Kongolo managed to return to training, but continued to remain on the sidelines throughout March. It wasn't until on 16 April 2017 when he returned to the first team from injury against Utrecht and setting up a goal for Eljero Elia, in a 2–0 win. Shortly after, he signed a contract extension with the club, keeping him until 2019. Kongolo played the remaining last four matches as a left-back later in the season and helped the club win the league for the first time since 1999. At the end of the 2016–17 season, he went on to make thirty-two appearances and scoring once in all competitions.

=== Monaco ===
After much speculation regarding his future at Feyenoord, Kongolo signed a five-year contract with reigning Ligue 1 champions Monaco, for an undisclosed transfer fee, reported to be in the region of €12 million. He was handed the traditional number 4 central defender shirt upon his arrival, most recently worn by Fábio Coentrão in the 2015–16 season. After being kept out of the squad for multiple fixtures, Kongolo eventually made his Monaco debut 13 October, in a 3–2 defeat to Lyon in the domestic competition.

He rarely played for Monaco during his brief tenure, only playing a further two games, both taking place in December (meaning that he missed almost two months of domestic football): a 1–0 win over Angers and a 2–1 victory over Rennes. However, he did manage to make a singular appearance in their UEFA Champions League campaign, appearing in a 5–2 defeat to Porto; as well as a 2–0 win over Caen in the Coupe de la Ligue and a 2–1 defeat to Paris Saint-Germain in the Trophée des Champions.

=== Huddersfield Town ===
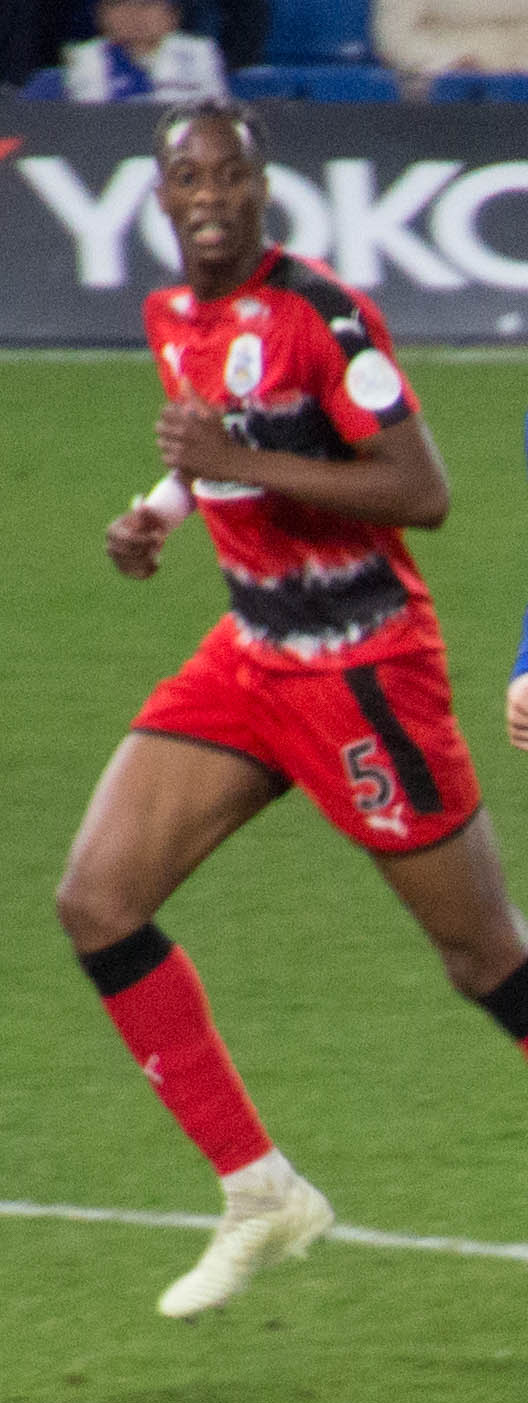
Kongolo playing for Huddersfield Town in May 2018

On 2 January 2018, Kongolo relocated to English football, signing for Premier League club Huddersfield Town on loan until the end of the season, with a view to a permanent transfer on the terms that Huddersfield avoided relegation. He made his debut for the club on 13 January, coming on as a substitute in a 4–1 defeat to West Ham United.

Kongolo signed for Huddersfield on a permanent basis on 8 June, for an undisclosed club record fee, as the club prepared for their second season in the Premier League. He made his debut as a permanent player of the Terriers, in a heavy 3–0 defeat to Chelsea, receiving a yellow card. Kongolo then went on to score his first ever goal for the club on 4 December, in a 2–1 defeat to Bournemouth at the Vitality Stadium.

His second season with the club was disappointing for the entire team, they had a managerial change mid-season with Jan Siewert replacing a sacked David Wagner, and the season ended in a bitter relegation, having been sat at the bottom of the table for the majority of the season; their Premier League status was confirmed to end after a 2–0 defeat to Crystal Palace, meaning they suffered the joint-earliest relegation alongside Derby County in 2008.

During the off-season, Kongolo was linked with a return to the Premier League, with Watford and divisional newcomers Aston Villa expressing their interests in signing the defender. However, he remained at Huddersfield, playing in 11 league matches before his departure in the winter transfer window. On 16 January 2020, Kongolo signed on loan for fellow Championship club Fulham until the end of the season; the club had also suffered relegation from the Premier League, alongside Huddersfield, in the previous season.

Kongolo was named on the Fulham bench as an unused substitute in their goalless draw against Charlton Athletic, before making his debut in a 4–0 FA Cup defeat to Manchester City on 26 January 2020. His league debut followed when he played as a substitute in a victory at Blackburn Rovers on 8 February 2020, coming off the bench for Josh Onomah; he would have played in their previous fixture, though was ruled out of playing against his parent club in Huddersfield. The Blackburn game proved to be his only league appearance for the club as he was ruled out of action for the rest of the season after picking up a foot injury during the game.

=== Fulham and loans out ===
After his future at Huddersfield Town continued to remain in doubt, Kongolo returned to Fulham, now in the Premier League after achieving promotion during Kongolo's loan spell during the second half of the previous league campaign; he joined them on a permanent deal on 16 October 2020, the domestic transfer deadline day, for an undisclosed fee, believed to be around £4 million, potentially rising to £7 million. He made his return from injury on 9 January 2021, appearing in a 2–0 win over Queens Park Rangers in the FA Cup.

On 1 September 2022, Kongolo joined Ligue 2 side Le Havre on loan for the remainder of the 2022–23 season.

On 1 September 2023, Kongolo joined Austrian Bundesliga club SK Rapid Wien on loan from Fulham until the end of the 2023–24 season.

On 5 June 2024, Fulham announced that Kongolo would be one of the players departing the club in the summer.

=== NAC Breda ===
On 2 September 2024, Kongolo returned to the Netherlands, joining Eredivisie side NAC Breda on a two-year deal.

On 18 January 2026, Breda terminated Kongolo's contract via mutual consent.

== International career ==
=== Youth ===
Kongolo was initially eligible to play for the Netherlands, Switzerland or DR Congo. After progressing at Netherlands U15 and Netherlands U16, Kongolo was called up by Netherlands U17 for the first time in September 2010 and scored on his debut on 15 September 2010, in a 5–2 win over Germany U17.

Kongolo was then a part of the Netherlands under-17 national team which won European Championship in 2011. During the final of the Under-17 Championship against Germany U17, he scored against them for the second time in his Netherlands U17 career, which saw Netherlands U17 win 5–2. He was also named to the Team of the Tournament. The following month, Kongolo was called up again for the 2011 FIFA U-17 World Cup in Mexico, but was unable to progress in the Group-Stage.

After playing Netherlands U18 briefly around 2012, Kongolo was called up by Netherlands U19 in August 2012 and made his Netherlands U19 debut on 10 September 2012, in a 2–1 win over Scotland U19. Kongolo went on to make ten appearances for the Netherlands U19, including playing three times in the UEFA European Under-19 Championship.

Months after playing the UEFA European Under-19 Championship, Kongolo was called up by Netherlands U21 for the first time in mid-August 2013. Kongolo made his Netherlands U21 debut on 14 August 2013, in a 2–1 loss against Czech Republic U21. Around the same time, Kongolo made his Netherlands U20 debut, in a 4–0 loss against Germany U20 on 12 October 2013. The following year, on 14 October 2014, Kongolo scored his first Netherlands U21 in the qualification round of UEFA European Under-21 Championship, in a 5–4 loss against Portugal U21.

=== Senior ===
Kongolo's performances for Feyenoord saw him included in senior team manager Louis Van Gaal's squad for the 2014 FIFA World Cup in Brazil. It wasn't until on 17 May 2014 when he made his senior national team debut, in a 1–1 draw against Ecuador. After the match, both van Gaal and Kongolo agreed that his performance was sloppy.

Nevertheless, Kongolo was included in the twenty-three man squad in the tournament, where he made one appearance in their final group game after entering as a substitute for Dirk Kuyt in the 89th minute against Chile; the Dutch won 2–0. Although making one appearance in the tournament, Netherlands finished third place in the World Cup and for that, he received a bronze medal.

== Style of play ==
Upon signing for Huddersfield Town in January 2018, manager David Wagner expressed his pleasure and excitement in the player joining the club, stating, "Terence has qualities that will really suit our style of play. He's athletic and mobile and he plays on the front foot in the way he defends and uses the ball."

== Personal life ==
Outside of football, Kongolo is an avid fan of basketball, especially the NBA.

== Career statistics ==
=== Club ===
Appearances and goals by club, season and competition
Club	Season	League			National cup		League cup		Europe		Other		Total	
Club	Season	Division	Apps	Goals	Apps	Goals	Apps	Goals	Apps	Goals	Apps	Goals	Apps	Goals
Feyenoord	2011–12	Eredivisie	1	0	0	0	–		–		–		0	0
Feyenoord	2012–13	Eredivisie	5	0	2	2	–		1	0	–		8	2
Feyenoord	2013–14	Eredivisie	17	0	1	0	–		0	0	–		18	0
Feyenoord	2014–15	Eredivisie	31	0	1	0	–		11	0	2	0	45	0
Feyenoord	2015–16	Eredivisie	29	0	6	0	–		–		–		35	0
Feyenoord	2016–17	Eredivisie	23	1	3	0	–		4	0	1	0	32	1
Feyenoord	Total		106	1	13	2	-	-	16	0	3	0	138	3
Monaco	2017–18	Ligue 1	3	0	0	0	1	0	1	0	1	0	6	0
Huddersfield Town	2017–18	Premier League	13	0	4	0	0	0	–		–		17	0
Huddersfield Town	2018–19	Premier League	32	1	0	0	0	0	–		–		32	1
Huddersfield Town	2019–20	Championship	11	0	0	0	0	0	–		–		11	0
Huddersfield Town	Total		56	1	4	0	0	0	0	0	0	0	60	1
Fulham (loan)	2019–20	Championship	1	0	1	0	0	0	–		–		2	0
Fulham	2020–21	Premier League	1	0	1	0	0	0	–		–		2	0
Fulham	2021–22	Championship	0	0	0	0	0	0	–		–		0	0
Fulham	Total		1	0	1	0	0	0	0	0	0	0	2	0
Le Havre (loan)	2022–23	Ligue 2	14	0	1	0	0	0	–		–		15	0
Rapid Wien (loan)	2023–24	Austrian Bundesliga	11	0	2	0	–		0	0	0	0	13	0
Career total			192	2	22	2	1	0	17	0	4	0	236	4

=== International ===
Appearances and goals by national team and year
National team	Year	Apps	Goals
Netherlands	2014	2	0
Netherlands	2015	1	0
Netherlands	2018	1	0
Total		4	0

== Honours ==
Feyenoord

- Eredivisie: 2016–17
- KNVB Cup: 2015–16

Netherlands

- FIFA World Cup third place: 2014
