= Philip Billing =

Danish footballer (born 1996)

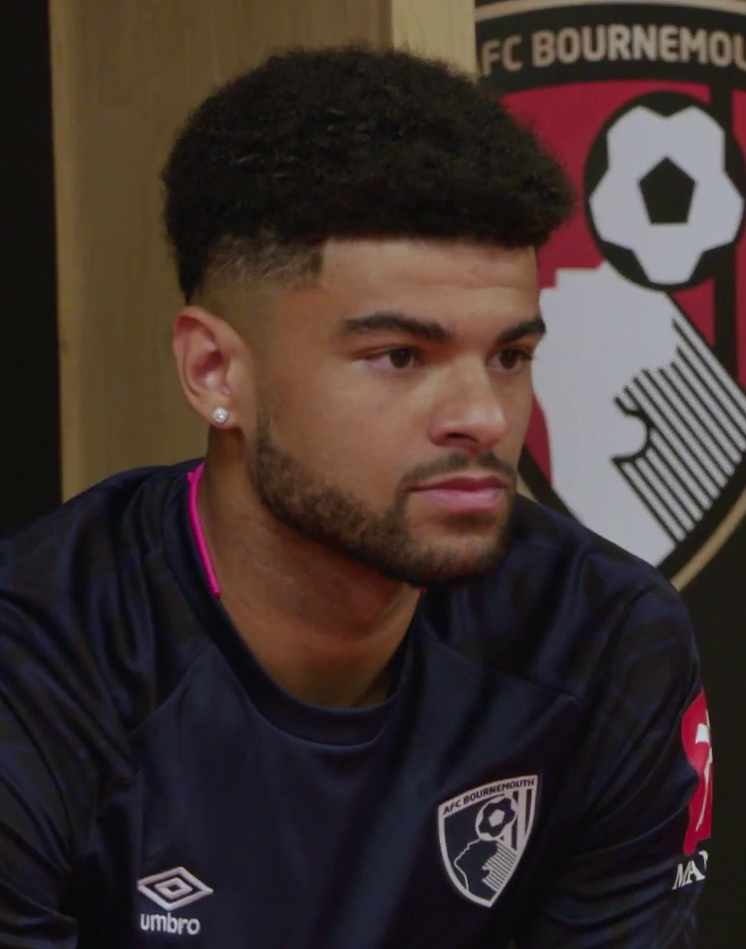
- Billing with Bournemouth in 2019

Personal information
- Full name: Philip Anyanwu Billing
- Date of birth: 11 June 1996 (age 30)
- Place of birth: Copenhagen, Denmark
- Height: 1.98 m (6 ft 6 in)
- Position: Midfielder

Team information
- Current team: Midtjylland
- Number: 8

Youth career
- Jerne IF
- –2013: Esbjerg
- 2013–2014: Huddersfield Town

Senior career*
| Years | Team | Apps | (Gls) |
| 2014–2019 | Huddersfield Town | 81 | (5) |
| 2019–2025 | Bournemouth | 183 | (28) |
| 2025 | → Napoli (loan) | 10 | (1) |
| 2025– | Midtjylland | 31 | (3) |

International career^{‡}
| 2014 | Denmark U19 | 1 | (0) |
| 2017–2019 | Denmark U21 | 7 | (2) |
| 2020– | Denmark | 6 | (0) |
- * Club domestic league appearances and goals as of 19 October 2026 (UTC) ‡ National team caps and goals as of 15 November 2025 (UTC)

Philip Anyanwu Billing (born 11 June 1996) is a Danish professional footballer who plays as a midfielder for Danish Superliga club Midtjylland and the Denmark national team.

== Club career ==
=== Huddersfield Town ===
Billing was born in Copenhagen. After signing for Esbjerg in his native Denmark, he joined Huddersfield Town in 2013 on a youth contract. Billing signed a four-year professional contract in October 2013. After performing well for both the under-18s and under-21s, he made his first team debut for the club as a substitute in their 2–0 loss against Leicester City at the John Smith's Stadium on 26 April 2014.

His first start for the Terriers came 18 months later in their 2–2 draw against Reading at the Madejski Stadium on 3 November 2015. His first goal for the club came from a 30-yard strike against Nottingham Forest at the City Ground in a 2–0 win for the Terriers on 13 February 2016. On 19 November 2016, he scored his second goal for the club with a volley from 32 yards out in a 3–2 loss against Cardiff City.

Billing got slowly more and more space in the squad. After 10 good matches in the 2015–16 season, Billing signed a contract extension in March 2016. He got his breakthrough in the 2016–17 season. "In-form" Billing was linked with a transfer to Premier League club Crystal Palace. He played 24 games and scored two goals in total in that season. After the season, Billing was named as the youth player of the season in Huddersfield and his goal against Cardiff City in November 2016 was voted goal of the season.

In March 2019, Billing suffered racial abuse on social media; the matter was reported to police.

=== Bournemouth ===
On 29 July 2019, Billing signed for Premier League Bournemouth on a long-term contract for a £15 million fee. He was given the No. 29 jersey. Billing made a strong start to his first season with Bournemouth, starting the first four Premier League games of the season and being nominated for the club's Player of the Month award for August.

Billing scored his first goals for the club in the FA Cup third round fixture against Luton Town, as Bournemouth won the game 4–0. He then scored his first Premier League goal for the club, netting the opening goal against relegation rivals Aston Villa in a 2–1 win for the home side on 1 February. Billing was involved in a controversial VAR decision in a 3–0 away loss to Burnley in the Premier League on 22 February, when his knock-down from a corner to Joshua King was judged to be a handball by the VAR officials. This was one of two Bournemouth goals disallowed for handball in the match. Billing scored eight goals in the Championship for the 2020–21 season, which was also his most prolific goalscoring season to date.

On 4 March 2023, Billing scored the opening goal in a 3–2 away defeat to Arsenal. Timed at just 9.11 seconds, his goal was the second fastest ever scored in the Premier League. On 21 August 2023, it was announced that Billing had signed a new contract, keeping him at the club until 2027. On 16 December 2023, during a Premier League match against Luton Town, Billing was the first person to summon assistance to opponent player Tom Lockyer, who had suffered a cardiac arrest on the pitch, before the arrival of the medical staff; following Lockyer's discharge from the hospital, Luton publicly thanked Billing in an official press statement.

=== Napoli ===
On 11 January 2025, Billing moved to Napoli in Italy on loan, with an option to buy for £9 million. During his loan he won the Italian Championship with Napoli.

=== Midtjylland ===
On 26 August 2025, Billing moved to Midtjylland in Denmark on a five-year contract. On 20 September 2025, he scored his first goal for the club in a 2–0 victory over local rivals Viborg.

== International career ==
Billing was born in Denmark to a Danish mother and Igbo Nigerian father. Billing is a Danish youth international, having represented the U19 and U21 teams.

He made his single appearance for the Danish U19s on 4 September 2014 as a substitute in their 2–1 win over Norway in Lyngdal. On 9 March 2017, he was called up to the Denmark under-20 team to face the Czech Republic and Romania. He earned his first cap for the Danish U21 team in a qualifying match for the 2019 European Championship against the Faroe Islands on 31 August 2017. It ended in a 3–0 win. He played another qualifying match a week later, a 6–0 win against Lithuania.

In November 2018, Billing turned down an approach to switch his international allegiance to Nigeria. In March 2019, he received his first call-up to the Danish senior national team. He debuted in a 4–0 friendly win over the Faroe Islands on 7 October 2020.

== Career statistics ==
=== Club ===
As of match played 19 October 2026

Appearances and goals by club, season and competition
| Club | Season | League | | | National cup (Note: Includes FA Cup, Danish Cup) | | League cup (Note: Includes EFL Cup) | | Other | | Total | |
| Club | Season | Division | Apps | Goals | Apps | Goals | Apps | Goals | Apps | Goals | Apps | Goals |
|---|---|---|---|---|---|---|---|---|---|---|---|---|
| Huddersfield Town | 2013–14 | Championship | 1 | 0 | 0 | 0 | 0 | 0 | — | | 1 | 0 |
| Huddersfield Town | 2014–15 | Championship | 0 | 0 | 0 | 0 | 0 | 0 | — | | 0 | 0 |
| Huddersfield Town | 2015–16 | Championship | 13 | 1 | 0 | 0 | 0 | 0 | — | | 13 | 1 |
| Huddersfield Town | 2016–17 | Championship | 24 | 2 | 4 | 0 | 0 | 0 | 0 | 0 | 28 | 2 |
| Huddersfield Town | 2017–18 | Premier League | 16 | 0 | 4 | 0 | 2 | 1 | — | | 22 | 1 |
| Huddersfield Town | 2018–19 | Premier League | 27 | 2 | 0 | 0 | 0 | 0 | — | | 27 | 2 |
| Huddersfield Town | Total | | 81 | 5 | 8 | 0 | 2 | 1 | 0 | 0 | 91 | 6 |
| Bournemouth | 2019–20 | Premier League | 34 | 1 | 1 | 2 | 1 | 0 | — | | 36 | 3 |
| Bournemouth | 2020–21 | Championship | 34 | 8 | 4 | 0 | 2 | 0 | 2 (Note: Appearances in Championship play-offs) | 0 | 42 | 8 |
| Bournemouth | 2021–22 | Championship | 40 | 10 | 1 | 0 | 1 | 1 | — | | 42 | 11 |
| Bournemouth | 2022–23 | Premier League | 36 | 7 | 1 | 0 | 1 | 0 | — | | 38 | 7 |
| Bournemouth | 2023–24 | Premier League | 29 | 2 | 2 | 0 | 2 | 0 | — | | 33 | 2 |
| Bournemouth | 2024–25 | Premier League | 10 | 0 | 0 | 0 | 0 | 0 | — | | 10 | 0 |
| Bournemouth | Total | | 183 | 28 | 9 | 2 | 7 | 1 | 2 | 0 | 201 | 31 |
| Napoli (loan) | 2024–25 | Serie A | 10 | 1 | — | | — | | — | | 10 | 1 |
| Midtjylland | 2025–26 | Danish Superliga | 20 | 2 | 7 | 0 | — | | 9 (Note: Appearances in UEFA Europa League) | 1 | 36 | 3 |
| Midtjylland | 2026–27 | Danish Superliga | 11 | 1 | 0 | 0 | — | | 7 (Note: Two appearances in UEFA Europa League, five appearances in UEFA Conference League) | 0 | 18 | 1 |
| Midtjylland | Total | | 31 | 3 | 7 | 0 | — | | 16 | 1 | 54 | 4 |
| Career total | | | 305 | 37 | 24 | 2 | 11 | 2 | 16 | 1 | 356 | 42 |

=== International ===
As of match played 15 November 2025

Appearances and goals by national team and year
| National team | Year | Apps | Goals |
|---|---|---|---|
| Denmark | 2020 | 1 | 0 |
| Denmark | 2021 | 0 | 0 |
| Denmark | 2022 | 2 | 0 |
| Denmark | 2023 | 2 | 0 |
| Denmark | 2024 | 0 | 0 |
| Denmark | 2025 | 1 | 0 |
| Total | | 6 | 0 |

== Honours ==
Huddersfield

- EFL Championship play-offs: 2017

Bournemouth

- EFL Championship: 2021/2022; runner-up

Napoli

- Serie A: 2024–25

Midtjylland

- Danish Cup: 2025–26

Individual

- PFA Team of the Year: 2021–22 Championship
- EFL Championship Team of the Season: 2021–22
- Huddersfield Town Young Player of the Year: 2015–16, 2016–17, 2018–19
- Huddersfield Town Goal of the Season: 2015–16
- Huddersfield Town Players' Player of the Year: 2018–19
- Danish Superliga Player of the Month: October 2025
