= 2019–20 EFL Championship =

16th season of the Football League Championship

EFL Championship
- Season: 2019–20
- Dates: 2 August 2019 – 4 August 2020
- Champions: Leeds United; 1st Championship title 4th 2nd tier title
- Promoted: Leeds United; West Bromwich Albion; Fulham
- Relegated: Charlton Athletic; Wigan Athletic; Hull City
- Matches: 552
- Goals: 1,457 (2.64 per match)
- Top goalscorer: Aleksandar Mitrović (Fulham) (26 goals)
- Biggest home win: Wigan Athletic 8–0 Hull City (14 July 2020)
- Biggest away win: Sheffield Wednesday 0–5 Blackburn Rovers (18 January 2020); Luton Town 0–5 Reading (4 July 2020)
- Highest scoring: Birmingham City 4–5 Leeds United (29 December 2019)
- Longest winning run: Brentford (8 matches)
- Longest unbeaten run: West Bromwich Albion (14 matches)
- Longest winless run: Barnsley (17 matches)
- Longest losing run: Huddersfield Town; Hull City (6 matches each)
- Highest attendance: 36,514; Leeds United 2–0 Huddersfield Town (7 March 2020)
- Lowest attendance: 8,965; Wigan Athletic 1–3 Reading (30 November 2019)
- Total attendance: 8,251,897
- Average attendance: 18,585

The 2019–20 EFL Championship (referred to as the Sky Bet Championship for sponsorship reasons) was the 4th season of the EFL Championship under its current title and the 28th season under its current league division format. Leeds United won the title, with West Bromwich Albion following in second. Brentford finished closely in third, only to lose in the playoff final to 4th placed Fulham, a narrow 2–1 victory at Wembley.

== Effects of the COVID-19 pandemic ==
The season was halted, following a decision on 13 March 2020 to suspend the league after a number of players and other club staff became ill due to the COVID-19 pandemic. The initial suspension was until 4 April, which was then extended until 30 April. On 13 May, following a meeting, the clubs decided to continue with the season with plans for players to return to training on 25 May.

In May, 1014 tests were carried out across all of the English Football League and funded by the clubs. Two people from Hull City returned positive results. Later in May, Elliott Bennett of Blackburn Rovers tested positive for the virus as did two unnamed players from Fulham. In further tests, Jayden Stockley of Preston North End tested positive as did one unnamed person from both Cardiff City and Middlesbrough. On 31 May, the EFL stated plans to restart the league on 20 June, with the play-off final being scheduled for around 30 July, subject to safety requirements and government approval being met.

On 7 June, two Championship clubs reported one person each to have tested positive of coronavirus, during the latest round of testing. A total of 1,179 people were tested in the duration of four days and those tested positive were required to self-isolate, as per EFL guidelines. On 8 June, the first round of fixtures was released. The first set of fixtures following the restart was scheduled for 20 June with the first fixture being Fulham against Brentford with a 12:30pm kick-off. In a further round of testing on 8 June, Stoke City manager Michael O'Neill tested positive for the virus having tested negative in five previous rounds of testing. A practice game between Stoke and Manchester United was called off at short notice with the Stoke players already in United's Carrington training ground.

== Team changes ==
The following teams have changed division since the 2018–19 season.

=== To Championship ===
Promoted from League One

- Luton Town
- Barnsley
- Charlton Athletic

Relegated from Premier League

- Cardiff City
- Fulham
- Huddersfield Town

=== From Championship ===
Promoted to Premier League

- Norwich City
- Sheffield United
- Aston Villa

Relegated to League One

- Rotherham United
- Bolton Wanderers
- Ipswich Town

== Stadiums ==
Locations of the 2019–20 EFL Championship teams
Greater London Championship football clubs

Team	Location	Stadium	Capacity
Barnsley	Barnsley	Oakwell	23,287
Birmingham City	Birmingham	St Andrew's	29,409
Blackburn Rovers	Blackburn	Ewood Park	31,367
Brentford	London (Brentford)	Griffin Park	12,300
Bristol City	Bristol	Ashton Gate	27,000
Cardiff City	Cardiff	Cardiff City Stadium	33,316
Charlton Athletic	London (Charlton)	The Valley	27,111
Derby County	Derby	Pride Park Stadium	33,600
Fulham	London (Fulham)	Craven Cottage	19,000
Huddersfield Town	Huddersfield	Kirklees Stadium	24,121
Hull City	Kingston upon Hull	KCOM Stadium	25,586
Leeds United	Leeds	Elland Road	37,890
Luton Town	Luton	Kenilworth Road	10,336
Middlesbrough	Middlesbrough	Riverside Stadium	34,000
Millwall	London (South Bermondsey)	The Den	20,146
Nottingham Forest	West Bridgford	City Ground	30,445
Preston North End	Preston	Deepdale	23,408
Queens Park Rangers	London (White City)	Kiyan Prince Foundation Stadium	18,439
Reading	Reading	Madejski Stadium	24,161
Sheffield Wednesday	Sheffield	Hillsborough Stadium	39,752
Stoke City	Stoke-on-Trent	Bet365 Stadium	30,089
Swansea City	Swansea	Liberty Stadium	21,088
West Bromwich Albion	West Bromwich	The Hawthorns	26,850
Wigan Athletic	Wigan	DW Stadium	25,133

- ^{1} The capacity of Craven Cottage will be reduced from 25,700 to 19,000 for the 2019–20 and 2020–21 seasons due to the redevelopment of the Riverside Stand which will increase the capacity to 29,600.

== Personnel and sponsoring ==
Team	Manager	Captain	Kit manufacturer	Sponsor
Barnsley	(Austria) Gerhard Struber	(Germany) Mike-Steven Bähre	(Germany) Puma	C.K. Beckett
Birmingham City	(Spain) Pep Clotet	(England) Harlee Dean	(Germany) Adidas	BoyleSports
Blackburn Rovers	(England) Tony Mowbray	(England) Elliott Bennett	(England) Umbro	10bet
Brentford	(Denmark) Thomas Frank	(Sweden) Pontus Jansson	(England) Umbro	EcoWorld
Bristol City	(England) Dean Holden	TBA^{2}	(England) Bristol Sport	Dunder
Cardiff City	(England) Neil Harris	(England) Sean Morrison	(Germany) Adidas	Tourism Malaysia
Charlton Athletic	(England) Lee Bowyer	(England) Chris Solly	(Denmark) Hummel	Children with Cancer UK
Derby County	(Netherlands) Phillip Cocu	(England) Wayne Rooney^{3}	(England) Umbro	32Red
Fulham	(England) Scott Parker	(Scotland) Tom Cairney	(Germany) Adidas	Dafabet
Huddersfield Town	(Spain) Carlos Corberán	(Germany) Christopher Schindler	(England) Umbro	Paddy Power (unbranded)^{4}
Hull City	(Northern Ireland) Grant McCann	(United States) Eric Lichaj	(England) Umbro	SportPesa
Leeds United	(Argentina) Marcelo Bielsa	(Scotland) Liam Cooper	(Italy) Kappa	32Red
Luton Town	(Wales) Nathan Jones	(England) Sonny Bradley	(Germany) Puma	Indigo Residential (home); Star Platforms (away); Ryebridge (third)
Middlesbrough	(England) Neil Warnock	(England) George Friend	(Denmark) Hummel	32Red
Millwall	(England) Gary Rowett	(Republic of Ireland) Alex Pearce	(Italy) Macron	Huski Chocolate
Nottingham Forest	(France) Sabri Lamouchi	(England) Michael Dawson	(Italy) Macron	Football Index
Preston North End	(Scotland) Alex Neil	(England) Tom Clarke	(United States) Nike	32Red
Queens Park Rangers	(England) Mark Warburton	(England) Grant Hall	(Italy) Erreà	Bet UK^{5}
Reading	(Wales) Mark Bowen	(England) Liam Moore	(Italy) Macron	Casumo
Sheffield Wednesday	(England) Garry Monk	(England) Tom Lees	(England) Elev8	Chansiri
Stoke City	(Northern Ireland) Michael O'Neill	(England) Ryan Shawcross	(Italy) Macron	bet365
Swansea City	(Wales) Steve Cooper	(England) Matt Grimes	(Spain) Joma	YOBET; Swansea University (back-of-shirt & training kit sponsor)
West Bromwich Albion	(Croatia) Slaven Bilić	(Northern Ireland) Chris Brunt	(Germany) Puma	Ideal Boilers
Wigan Athletic	(England) Paul Cook	(Egypt) Sam Morsy	(Germany) Puma	KB88

1. Clotet was initially appointed as caretaker manager before he was appointed on a permanent basis on 4 December 2019.
2. Bristol City's captain was Bailey Wright in the first half of the season, but he left on 21 January to join Sunderland on loan. Vice-captain Josh Brownhill served in this position between 21 and 30 January when he left for Burnley, no replacement has been named as of 30 January.
3. Derby County's captain was Richard Keogh until his contract was terminated on 30 October 2019, with Curtis Davies acting in this position from 30 October until 1 January 2020.
4. Huddersfield Town's shirt does not display Paddy Power's logo as part of the bookmakers' "Save Our Shirt" campaign.
5. Queens Park Rangers' shirt sponsor was Royal Panda until 29 January 2020 when they decided to leave the United Kingdom market.

== Managerial changes ==
Team	Outgoing manager	Manner of departure	Date of vacancy	Position in table	Incoming manager	Date of appointment
Luton Town	(England) Mick Harford	End of caretaker spell	4 May 2019	Pre-season	(England) Graeme Jones	7 May 2019
Queens Park Rangers	(England) John Eustace	End of caretaker spell	5 May 2019	Pre-season	(England) Mark Warburton	8 May 2019
West Bromwich Albion	(England) James Shan	End of caretaker spell	14 May 2019	Pre-season	(Croatia) Slaven Bilić	13 June 2019
Middlesbrough	(Wales) Tony Pulis	End of contract	17 May 2019	Pre-season	(England) Jonathan Woodgate	14 June 2019
Swansea City	(England) Graham Potter	Signed by Brighton & Hove Albion	20 May 2019	Pre-season	(Wales) Steve Cooper	13 June 2019
Hull City	(England) Nigel Adkins	End of contract	8 June 2019	Pre-season	(Northern Ireland) Grant McCann	21 June 2019
Birmingham City	(England) Garry Monk	Sacked	18 June 2019	Pre-season	(Spain) Pep Clotet	4 December 2019
Nottingham Forest	(Northern Ireland) Martin O'Neill	Sacked	28 June 2019	Pre-season	(France) Sabri Lamouchi	28 June 2019
Derby County	(England) Frank Lampard	Signed by Chelsea	4 July 2019	Pre-season	(Netherlands) Phillip Cocu	5 July 2019
Sheffield Wednesday	(England) Steve Bruce	Resigned	15 July 2019	Pre-season	(England) Garry Monk	6 September 2019
Huddersfield Town	(Germany) Jan Siewert	Sacked	16 August 2019	20th	(England) Danny Cowley	9 September 2019
Millwall	(England) Neil Harris	Resigned	3 October 2019	18th	(England) Gary Rowett	21 October 2019
Barnsley	(Germany) Daniel Stendel	Sacked	8 October 2019	23rd	(Austria) Gerhard Struber	20 November 2019
Reading	(Portugal) José Gomes	Sacked	9 October 2019	22nd	(Wales) Mark Bowen	14 October 2019
Stoke City	(Wales) Nathan Jones	Sacked	1 November 2019	24th	(Northern Ireland) Michael O'Neill	8 November 2019
Cardiff City	(England) Neil Warnock	Mutual consent	11 November 2019	14th	(England) Neil Harris	16 November 2019
Luton Town	(England) Graeme Jones	Mutual consent	24 April 2020	23rd	(Wales) Nathan Jones	28 May 2020
Middlesbrough	(England) Jonathan Woodgate	Sacked	23 June 2020	21st	(England) Neil Warnock	23 June 2020
Bristol City	(England) Lee Johnson	Sacked	4 July 2020	12th	(England) Dean Holden	10 August 2020
Birmingham City	(Spain) Pep Clotet	Mutual consent	8 July 2020	17th	(Spain) Aitor Karanka	31 July 2020
Huddersfield Town	(England) Danny Cowley	Sacked	19 July 2020	18th	(Spain) Carlos Corberán	23 July 2020

== League table ==
Pos	Team	Pld	W	D	L	GF	GA	GD	Pts	Promotion, qualification or relegation
1	Leeds United (C, P)	46	28	9	9	77	35	+42	93	Promotion to the Premier League
2	West Bromwich Albion (P)	46	22	17	7	77	45	+32	83	Promotion to the Premier League
3	Brentford	46	24	9	13	80	38	+42	81	Qualification for Championship play-offs (Note: Four teams play for one spot and promotion to the Premier League.)
4	Fulham (O, P)	46	23	12	11	64	48	+16	81	Qualification for Championship play-offs
5	Cardiff City	46	19	16	11	68	58	+10	73	Qualification for Championship play-offs
6	Swansea City	46	18	16	12	62	53	+9	70	Qualification for Championship play-offs
7	Nottingham Forest	46	18	16	12	58	50	+8	70	
8	Millwall	46	17	17	12	57	51	+6	68	
9	Preston North End	46	18	12	16	59	54	+5	66	
10	Derby County	46	17	13	16	62	64	−2	64	
11	Blackburn Rovers	46	17	12	17	66	63	+3	63	
12	Bristol City	46	17	12	17	60	65	−5	63	
13	Queens Park Rangers	46	16	10	20	67	76	−9	58	
14	Reading	46	15	11	20	59	58	+1	56	
15	Stoke City	46	16	8	22	62	68	−6	56	
16	Sheffield Wednesday	46	15	11	20	58	66	−8	56	
17	Middlesbrough	46	13	14	19	48	61	−13	53	
18	Huddersfield Town	46	13	12	21	52	70	−18	51	
19	Luton Town	46	14	9	23	54	82	−28	51	
20	Birmingham City	46	12	14	20	54	75	−21	50	
21	Barnsley	46	12	13	21	49	69	−20	49	
22	Charlton Athletic (R)	46	12	12	22	50	65	−15	48	Relegation to EFL League One
23	Wigan Athletic (R)	46	15	14	17	57	56	+1	47 (Note: As a result of Wigan Athletic entering administration, the club was subject to a 12-point deduction. In accordance with EFL regulations, the timing of the sporting sanction was only determined once final league placings in the Championship were determined. Since the club did not finish in the relegation places at the end of season, the sanction was applied to their 2019–20 total and final league standings were amended as appropriate.)	Relegation to EFL League One
24	Hull City (R)	46	12	9	25	57	87	−30	45	Relegation to EFL League One

Source: EFL Official Website
Rules for classification: 1) Points; 2) Goal difference; 3) Number of goals scored; 4) Head-to-head results; 5) Wins; 6) Away goals; 7) Penalty points (sec 9.5); 8) 12-point sending off offences
(C) Champions; (O) Play-off winners; (P) Promoted; (R) Relegated

== Play-offs ==
Semi-finals
3	Brentford	0	3	3
6	Swansea City	1	1	2
4	Fulham	2	1	3
5	Cardiff City	0	2	2

Final
3	Brentford	1
4	Fulham	2

== Results ==
Home \ Away	BAR	BIR	BLB	BRE	BRI	CAR	CHA	DER	FUL	HUD	HUL	LEE	LUT	MID	MIL	NOT	PNE	QPR	REA	SHW	STO	SWA	WBA	WIG
Barnsley	—	0–1	2–0	1–3	2–2	0–2	2–2	2–2	1–0	2–1	3–1	0–2	1–3	1–0	0–0	1–0	0–3	5–3	1–1	1–1	2–4	1–1	1–1	0–0
Birmingham City	2–0	—	1–0	1–1	1–1	1–1	1–1	1–3	0–1	0–3	3–3	4–5	2–1	2–1	1–1	2–1	0–1	0–2	1–3	3–3	2–1	1–3	2–3	2–3
Blackburn Rovers	3–2	1–1	—	1–0	3–1	0–0	1–2	1–0	0–1	2–2	3–0	1–3	1–2	1–0	2–0	1–1	1–1	2–1	4–3	2–1	0–0	2–2	1–1	0–0
Brentford	1–2	0–1	2–2	—	1–1	2–1	2–1	3–0	1–0	0–1	1–1	1–1	7–0	3–2	3–2	0–1	1–0	3–1	1–0	5–0	0–0	3–1	1–0	3–0
Bristol City	1–0	1–3	0–2	0–4	—	0–1	2–1	3–2	1–1	5–2	2–1	1–3	3–0	2–2	1–2	0–0	1–1	2–0	1–0	1–2	1–1	0–0	0–3	2–2
Cardiff City	3–2	4–2	2–3	2–2	0–1	—	0–0	2–1	1–1	2–1	3–0	2–0	2–1	1–0	1–1	0–1	0–0	3–0	1–1	1–1	1–0	0–0	2–1	2–2
Charlton Athletic	2–1	0–1	0–2	1–0	3–2	2–2	—	3–0	0–0	0–1	2–2	1–0	3–1	0–1	0–1	1–1	0–1	1–0	0–1	1–3	3–1	1–2	2–2	2–2
Derby County	2–1	3–2	3–0	1–3	1–2	1–1	2–1	—	1–1	1–1	1–0	1–3	2–0	2–0	0–1	1–1	1–0	1–1	2–1	1–1	4–0	0–0	1–1	1–0
Fulham	0–3	1–0	2–0	0–2	1–2	2–0	2–2	3–0	—	3–2	0–3	2–1	3–2	1–0	4–0	1–2	2–0	2–1	1–2	5–3	1–0	1–0	1–1	2–0
Huddersfield Town	2–1	1–1	2–1	0–0	2–1	0–3	4–0	1–2	1–2	—	3–0	0–2	0–2	0–0	1–1	2–1	0–0	2–0	0–2	0–2	2–5	1–1	2–1	0–2
Hull City	0–1	3–0	0–1	1–5	1–3	2–2	0–1	2–0	0–1	1–2	—	0–4	0–1	2–1	0–1	0–2	4–0	2–3	2–1	1–0	2–1	4–4	0–1	2–2
Leeds United	1–0	1–0	2–1	1–0	1–0	3–3	4–0	1–1	3–0	2–0	2–0	—	1–1	4–0	3–2	1–1	1–1	2–0	1–0	0–2	5–0	0–1	1–0	0–1
Luton Town	1–1	1–2	3–2	2–1	3–0	0–1	2–1	3–2	3–3	2–1	0–3	1–2	—	3–3	1–1	1–2	1–1	1–1	0–5	1–0	1–1	0–1	1–2	2–1
Middlesbrough	1–0	1–1	1–1	0–1	1–3	1–3	1–0	2–2	0–0	1–0	2–2	0–1	0–1	—	1–1	2–2	1–1	0–1	1–0	1–4	2–1	0–3	0–1	1–0
Millwall	1–2	0–0	1–0	1–0	1–1	2–2	2–1	2–3	1–1	4–1	1–1	2–1	3–1	0–2	—	2–2	1–0	1–2	2–0	1–0	2–0	1–1	0–2	2–2
Nottingham Forest	1–0	3–0	3–2	1–0	1–0	0–1	0–1	1–0	0–1	3–1	1–2	2–0	3–1	1–1	0–3	—	1–1	0–0	1–1	0–4	1–4	2–2	1–2	1–0
Preston North End	5–1	2–0	3–2	2–0	3–3	1–3	2–1	0–1	2–1	3–1	2–1	1–1	2–1	0–2	0–1	1–1	—	1–3	0–2	2–1	3–1	1–1	0–1	3–0
Queens Park Rangers	0–1	2–2	4–2	1–3	0–1	6–1	2–2	2–1	1–2	1–1	1–2	1–0	3–2	2–2	4–3	0–4	2–0	—	2–2	0–3	4–2	1–3	0–2	3–1
Reading	2–0	2–3	1–2	0–3	0–1	3–0	0–2	3–0	1–4	0–0	1–1	0–1	3–0	1–2	2–1	1–1	1–0	1–0	—	1–3	1–1	1–4	1–2	0–3
Sheffield Wednesday	2–0	1–1	0–5	2–1	1–0	1–2	1–0	1–3	1–1	0–0	0–1	0–0	1–0	1–2	0–0	1–1	1–3	1–2	0–3	—	1–0	2–2	0–3	1–0
Stoke City	4–0	2–0	1–2	1–0	1–2	2–0	3–1	2–2	2–0	0–1	5–1	0–3	3–0	0–2	0–0	2–3	0–2	1–2	0–0	3–2	—	2–0	0–2	2–1
Swansea City	0–0	3–0	1–1	0–3	1–0	1–0	1–0	2–3	1–2	3–1	2–1	0–1	0–1	3–1	0–1	0–1	3–2	0–0	1–1	2–1	1–2	—	0–0	2–1
West Bromwich Albion	2–2	0–0	3–2	1–1	4–1	4–2	2–2	2–0	0–0	4–2	4–2	1–1	2–0	0–2	1–1	2–2	2–0	2–2	1–1	2–1	0–1	5–1	—	0–1
Wigan Athletic	0–0	1–0	2–0	0–3	0–2	3–2	2–0	1–1	1–1	1–1	8–0	0–2	0–0	2–2	1–0	1–0	1–2	1–0	1–3	2–1	3–0	1–2	1–1	—

Source: EFL Official Website
Legend: Blue = home team win; Yellow = draw; Red = away team win.
For upcoming matches, an "a" indicates there is an article about the rivalry between the two participants.

== Season statistics ==
=== Top scorers ===
Rank	Player	Club	Goals
1	(Serbia) Aleksandar Mitrović	Fulham	26
2	(England) Ollie Watkins	Brentford	25
3	(England) Lewis Grabban	Nottingham Forest	20
4	(England) Karlan Grant	Huddersfield Town	19
5	(Bermuda) Nahki Wells	Queens Park Rangers / Bristol City	18
6	(Algeria) Saïd Benrahma	Brentford	17
7	(England) Adam Armstrong	Blackburn Rovers	16
7	(England) Patrick Bamford	Leeds United	16
7	(England) Jarrod Bowen (Note: Bowen joined Premier League club West Ham United on 31 January 2020.)	Hull City	16
10	(Ghana) André Ayew	Swansea City	15
10	(England) Lukas Jutkiewicz	Birmingham City	15
10	(Cameroon) Bryan Mbeumo	Brentford	15
10	(Scotland) Steven Fletcher	Sheffield Wednesday	15
10	(England) Martyn Waghorn	Derby County	15
10	(Republic of Ireland) James Collins	Luton Town	15
10	(England) Jed Wallace	Millwall	15
10	(England) Cauley Woodrow	Barnsley	15

=== Top assists ===
Rank	Player	Club	Assists
1	(Brazil) Matheus Pereira	West Bromwich Albion	16
2	(England) Jed Wallace	Millwall	13
3	(Sweden) Niclas Eliasson	Bristol City	12
4	(England) John Swift	Reading	10
4	(England) Lee Tomlin	Cardiff City	10
6	(Scotland) Jacob Brown	Barnsley	9
6	(Spain) Pablo Hernández	Leeds United	9
8	(England) Sammy Ameobi	Nottingham Forest	8
8	(Scotland) Barry Bannan	Sheffield Wednesday	8
8	(Algeria) Saïd Benrahma	Brentford	8
8	(England) Stewart Downing	Blackburn Rovers	8
8	(England) Eberechi Eze	Queens Park Rangers	8
8	(England) Conor Gallagher	Swansea	8
8	(Poland) Kamil Grosicki	Hull City / West Bromwich Albion	8
8	(England) Jack Harrison	Leeds United	8
8	(England) Joe Lolley	Nottingham Forest	8
8	(England) Alex Mowatt	Barnsley	8
8	(Nigeria) Bright Osayi-Samuel	Queens Park Rangers	8

=== Hat-tricks ===
Player	For	Against	Result	Date	Ref
(England) Ollie Watkins	Brentford	Barnsley	3–1 (A)	29 September 2019	
(Serbia) Aleksandar Mitrović	Fulham	Luton Town	3–2 (H)	23 October 2019	
(England) Joe Ralls	Cardiff City	Birmingham City	4–2 (H)	2 November 2019	
(England) Josh Dasilva	Brentford	Luton Town	7–0 (H)	30 November 2019	
(Romania) George Pușcaș	Reading	Wigan Athletic	3–1 (A)	30 November 2019	
(England) Conor Chaplin	Barnsley	Queens Park Rangers	5–3 (H)	14 December 2019	
(Scotland) Jordan Rhodes	Sheffield Wednesday	Nottingham Forest	4–0 (A)	14 December 2019	
(Bermuda) Nahki Wells	Queens Park Rangers	Cardiff City	6–1 (H)	1 January 2020	
(Algeria) Saïd Benrahma	Brentford	Hull City	5–1 (A)	1 February 2020	
(England) Matt Smith	Millwall	Nottingham Forest	3–0 (A)	6 March 2020	
(England) Louie Sibley	Derby County	Millwall	3–2 (A)	20 June 2020	
(Ivory Coast) Yakou Méïté	Reading	Luton Town	5–0 (A) (Note: Player scored 4 goals)	4 July 2020	
(Algeria) Saïd Benrahma	Brentford	Wigan Athletic	3–0 (H)	4 July 2020	
(England) Kieran Dowell	Wigan Athletic	Hull City	8–0 (H)	14 July 2020	

== Awards ==
=== Monthly ===
Month	Manager of the Month		Player of the Month	
Month	Manager	Club	Player	Club
August	(Wales) Steve Cooper	Swansea City	(Jamaica) Daniel Johnson	Preston North End
September	(France) Sabri Lamouchi	Nottingham Forest	(England) Chey Dunkley	Wigan Athletic
October	(England) Danny Cowley	Huddersfield Town	(Serbia) Aleksandar Mitrović	Fulham
November	(Argentina) Marcelo Bielsa	Leeds United	(England) Jarrod Bowen	Hull City
December	(England) Jonathan Woodgate	Middlesbrough	(England) Conor Chaplin	Barnsley
January	(France) Sabri Lamouchi	Nottingham Forest	(Bermuda) Nahki Wells	Queens Park Rangers
February	(Croatia) Slaven Bilić	West Bromwich Albion	(Republic of Ireland) Scott Hogan	Birmingham City
June	(Denmark) Thomas Frank	Brentford	(England) Jason Pearce	Charlton Athletic
July	(Argentina) Marcelo Bielsa	Leeds United	(Algeria) Saïd Benrahma	Brentford

=== Annual ===
Award	Winner	Club
Player of the Season	(England) Ollie Watkins	Brentford
Young Player of the Season	(England) Jude Bellingham	Birmingham City

=== PFA Championship Team of the Year ===
Pos.	Player	Club
GK	(France) Brice Samba	Nottingham Forest
DF	(England) Luke Ayling	Leeds United
DF	(England) Ben White	Leeds United
DF	(Scotland) Liam Cooper	Leeds United
DF	(England) Joe Bryan	Fulham
MF	(Saint Kitts and Nevis) Romaine Sawyers	West Bromwich Albion
MF	(England) Kalvin Phillips	Leeds United
MF	(England) Eberechi Eze	Queens Park Rangers
FW	(Algeria) Saïd Benrahma	Brentford
FW	(England) Ollie Watkins	Brentford
FW	(Serbia) Aleksandar Mitrović	Fulham
