= Jan Siewert =

German footballer and manager (born 1982)

Personal information
- Date of birth: 23 August 1982 (age 44)
- Place of birth: Mayen, West Germany
- Height: 1.80 m (5 ft 11 in)
- Position: Defensive midfielder

Senior career*
Years	Team	Apps	(Gls)
2001–2005	TuS Mayen		

Managerial career
- 2015–2016: Rot-Weiss Essen
- 2017–2019: Borussia Dortmund II
- 2019: Huddersfield Town
- 2020–2021: Mainz 05 (interim)
- 2023: Mainz 05 (interim)
- 2023–2024: Mainz 05
- 2024–2025: Greuther Fürth
- * Club domestic league appearances and goals

Jan Siewert (born 23 August 1982) is a German professional football coach and former player who last managed Greuther Fürth.

== Playing career ==
Born in Mayen, Siewert played as a defensive midfielder for TuS Mayen. He retired at the age of 22 due to injury.

== Coaching career ==
=== Early career ===
Siewert trained at the Hennes-Weisweiler-Akademie. After working as the assistant manager for the German under-17 and under-18 national teams, Siewert signed a three-year contract to become manager of German fourth-tier side Rot-Weiss Essen in June 2015. He was sacked by the club in April 2016 after the club entered the relegation zone. Siewert then became assistant manager of VfL Bochum, manager of the VfL Bochum under-19 team, and manager of Borussia Dortmund II.

=== Huddersfield Town ===
In January 2019, he was linked with the vacant manager's position at Premier League club Huddersfield Town, and later that month he was appointed to the role, signing a contract until the summer of 2021. In doing so, he became the third Borussia Dortmund II manager in a row to leave that role to work in England; after David Wagner (who he replaced at Huddersfield) and Daniel Farke (who became manager of Norwich City). Siewert stated that he did not wish to be compared to Wagner, his predecessor at Huddersfield. Huddersfield were relegated to The Championship in March 2019 with six games remaining, joining Ipswich Town and Derby County as being the only Premier League teams to have been relegated so early in the season. Huddersfield gained one point from their first three league games in the 2019–20 season and were knocked out of the EFL Cup first round by Lincoln City. On 16 August 2019, after one win during 19 games in charge, Siewert was sacked. He later said that he "left his heart" at Huddersfield.

=== Return to Germany ===
On 1 July 2020 he became the Academy Manager at Mainz 05. On 28 December 2020, Siewert was appointed as interim manager of Mainz's first team in the Bundesliga after Jan-Moritz Lichte was dismissed. He managed one game before being replaced by Bo Svensson.

On 2 November 2023, he became interim manager once again, replacing Svensson until further notice. On 22 December 2023, Mainz announced that Siewert had been made permanent manager of the club. He was sacked on 12 February 2024 after just one win in twelve matches.

In November 2024, he was named the new head coach of Greuther Fürth. In May 2025, he was sacked.

== Personal life ==
As of January 2020 Siewert was married with a three-year-old son. At that time the family were still living near Huddersfield.

== Managerial statistics ==
As of match played 4 May 2025

Managerial record by team and tenure
Team	From	To	Record					Ref.
Team	From	To	P	W	D	L	Win %	Ref.
Rot-Weiss Essen	1 July 2015	3 April 2016	29	7	12	10	24.1	
Borussia Dortmund II	1 July 2017	20 January 2019	55	25	15	15	45.5	
Huddersfield Town	21 January 2019	16 August 2019	19	1	3	15	5.3	
Mainz 05 (interim)	28 December 2020	4 January 2021	1	0	0	1	0.0	
Mainz 05	2 November 2023	12 February 2024	12	1	6	5	8.3	
Greuther Fürth	12 November 2024	5 May 2025	20	6	4	10	30.0	
Total			136	40	40	56	29.4	—
