= Christopher Schindler =

German footballer

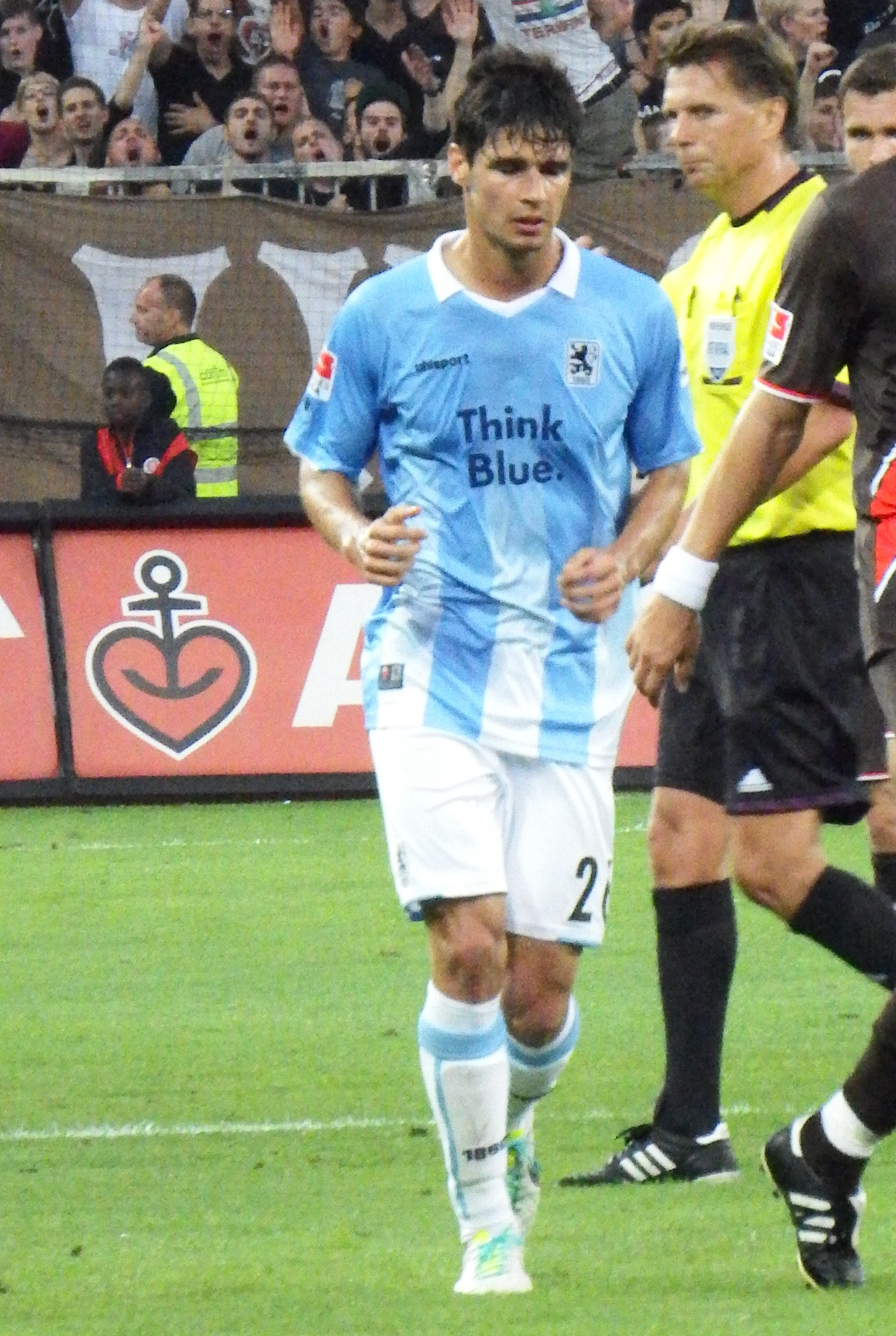
- Schindler with 1860 Munich in 2013

Personal information
- Full name: Christopher Wolfgang Georg August Schindler
- Date of birth: 29 April 1990 (age 36)
- Place of birth: Munich, West Germany
- Height: 1.89 m (6 ft 2 in)
- Position: Centre-back

Youth career
- 1999–2009: 1860 Munich

Senior career*
Years	Team	Apps	(Gls)
2009–2013	1860 Munich II	39	(3)
2010–2016	1860 Munich	152	(4)
2016–2021	Huddersfield Town	175	(5)
2021–2024	1. FC Nürnberg	56	(1)
Total		422	(13)

International career
2011–2012	Germany U21	4	(0)
- * Club domestic league appearances and goals

Christopher Wolfgang Georg August Schindler (German pronunciation: [ˈkʁɪstɔfɐ ˈʃɪndlɐ]; born 29 April 1990) is a German former professional footballer who played as a centre-back. After beginning his career with 1860 Munich, he moved to English club Huddersfield Town in 2016, with whom he secured promotion to the Premier League. He joined Nürnberg in 2021 and has also played for Germany's U21s.

== Club career ==
Schindler began his career with his hometown team, TSV 1860 Munich. He was named captain of the team after Julian Weigl was suspended to the second squad and fined for disciplinary reasons early in the 2014–15 season.

After making over 200 appearances for 1860 Munich's first and second teams, Schindler joined English Championship club Huddersfield Town on 29 June 2016. He signed a three-year contract, with Huddersfield paying an undisclosed then-club record fee, reported to be around £1.8 million. Schindler joined Chris Löwe, Michael Hefele, Martin Cranie and Mark Hudson as former captains at the club. He made his debut for the Terriers in a 2–1 Championship win over Brentford on 6 August 2016, the opening game of the season. Schindler scored his first goal for the club, a header, in a 1–0 win over Ipswich Town on 1 October 2016.

On 29 May 2017, Schindler scored the winning penalty in the 2017 Championship play-off final in a penalty shootout against Reading, which promoted Huddersfield Town to the Premier League. He signed a new three-year contract with the club on 24 July 2017, with the option of an additional year, after making 48 appearances in the 2016–17 season.

On 10 August 2018, Schindler signed another new contract, keeping him at the club until the summer of 2021, with the option of a further year. He had played all but one game of the Terriers' games in the 2017–18 season, in which Huddersfield secured Premier League survival. Head coach David Wagner commented that "he took to the Premier League as if he had played in it all his life".

He won the club's player of the year award in 2017–18 and 2018–19, becoming the first back-to-back winner of the award since Peter Clarke in 2011.

On 11 May 2021, it was announced that Schindler would be leaving Huddersfield Town at the end of his contract, after five years at the club. The club's chairman Phil Hodgkinson said that "he will always be considered among the greats at Huddersfield Town". 1. FC Nürnberg reported his signing the same day, on a free transfer.

In October 2022, Schindler extended his contract with Nürnberg. He was released by the club in summer 2024. Schindler was appointed as head of scouting at the club in September 2025.

== International career ==
Schindler is a former youth international, having played four games for the Germany national under-21 football team in 2011 and 2012.

== Career statistics ==
Appearances and goals by club, season and competition
Club	Season	League			National cup		League cup		Other		Total	
Club	Season	Division	Apps	Goals	Apps	Goals	Apps	Goals	Apps	Goals	Apps	Goals
1860 Munich II	2009–10	Regionalliga Süd	20	1	—		—		—		20	1
1860 Munich II	2010–11	Regionalliga Süd	12	2	—		—		—		12	2
1860 Munich II	2012–13	Regionalliga Bayern	7	0	—		—		—		7	0
1860 Munich II	Total		39	3	—		—		—		39	3
1860 Munich	2010–11	2. Bundesliga	16	1	0	0	—		—		16	1
1860 Munich	2011–12	2. Bundesliga	30	1	2	0	—		—		32	1
1860 Munich	2012–13	2. Bundesliga	18	0	3	0	—		—		21	0
1860 Munich	2013–14	2. Bundesliga	26	0	2	0	—		—		28	0
1860 Munich	2014–15	2. Bundesliga	29	1	2	0	—		2	0	33	1
1860 Munich	2015–16	2. Bundesliga	33	1	3	0	—		—		36	1
1860 Munich	Total		152	4	12	0	—		2	0	166	4
Huddersfield Town	2016–17	Championship	44	2	0	0	1	0	3 (Note: Appearances in championship play-offs)	0	48	2
Huddersfield Town	2017–18	Premier League	37	0	1	0	1	0	—		39	0
Huddersfield Town	2018–19	Premier League	37	1	0	0	1	0	—		38	1
Huddersfield Town	2019–20	Championship	45	2	1	0	0	0	—		46	2
Huddersfield Town	2020–21	Championship	12	0	0	0	1	0	—		13	0
Huddersfield Town	Total		175	5	2	0	4	0	3	0	184	5
1. FC Nürnberg	2021–22	2. Bundesliga	30	1	2	0	—		0	0	32	1
1. FC Nürnberg	2022–23	2. Bundesliga	26	0	4	0	—		0	0	30	0
1. FC Nürnberg	Total		56	1	6	0	0	0	0	0	62	1
Career total			422	13	20	0	4	0	5	0	451	13

== Honours ==
Huddersfield Town

- EFL Championship play-offs: 2017
