= 2016–17 Huddersfield Town A.F.C. season =

Huddersfield Town
2016–17 season
- Chairman: Dean Hoyle
- Head Coach: David Wagner
- Stadium: John Smith's Stadium
- Championship: 5th (promoted via play-offs)
- Play-offs: Winners
- FA Cup: Fifth round (eliminated by Manchester City)
- EFL Cup: First round (eliminated by Shrewsbury Town)
- Top goalscorer: League: Elias Kachunga (12); All: Elias Kachunga (13)
- Highest home attendance: 24,129 vs Manchester City (18 February 2017)
- Lowest home attendance: 11,715 vs Port Vale (7 January 2017)
- Average home league attendance: 20,165
- Biggest win: 4–0 vs Port Vale (7 January 2017); 4–0 vs Rochdale (28 January 2017)
- Biggest defeat: 0–5 vs Fulham (29 October 2016)
Home colours	Away colours	Third colours

The 2016–17 season is Huddersfield Town's fifth consecutive season in the Championship and 108th year in existence. Along with competing in the Championship, the club participated in the FA Cup and League Cup.

Huddersfield Town were promoted to the Premier League on 29 May 2017, following a 4–3 penalty shootout victory over Reading in the 2017 EFL Championship play-off final, after drawing 0–0 in both normal and extra time.

The season covers the period from 1 July 2016 to 30 June 2017.

== Transfers ==
=== Transfers in ===
Date from	Position	Nationality	Name	From	Fee	Ref.
1 July 2016	GK	(England)	Luke Coddington	Middlesbrough	Free transfer	
1 July 2016	GK	(England)	Joel Coleman	Oldham Athletic	Undisclosed	
1 July 2016	GK	(England)	George Dorrington	Manchester United	Free transfer	
1 July 2016	CB	(Germany)	Michael Hefele	Dynamo Dresden	Free transfer	
1 July 2016	LB	(Germany)	Chris Löwe	1. FC Kaiserslautern	Free transfer	
1 July 2016	DM	(Croatia)	Ivan Paurević	FC Ufa	Undisclosed	
1 July 2016	CM	(England)	Jack Payne	Southend United	Compensation	
1 July 2016	CB	(Germany)	Christopher Schindler	1860 Munich	£1,800,000	
1 July 2016	RW	(Netherlands)	Rajiv van La Parra	Wolverhampton Wanderers	Undisclosed	
8 July 2016	CB	(Slovenia)	Jon Gorenc Stanković	Borussia Dortmund II	Undisclosed	
24 August 2016	LB	(England)	Tareiq Holmes-Dennis	Charlton Athletic	Undisclosed	
20 January 2017	CF	(Germany)	Collin Quaner	Union Berlin	Undisclosed	

=== Loans in ===
Date from	Position	Nationality	Name	From	Date until	Ref.
1 July 2016	CF	(Democratic Republic of the Congo)	Elias Kachunga	FC Ingolstadt 04	End of Season	
5 July 2016	CM	(Australia)	Aaron Mooy	Manchester City	End of Season	
11 July 2016	GK	(Wales)	Danny Ward	Liverpool	End of Season	
15 July 2016	AM	(England)	Kasey Palmer	Chelsea	End of Season	
6 January 2017	LW	(England)	Isaiah Brown	Chelsea	End of Season	

=== Loans out ===
Date from	Position	Nationality	Name	To	Date until	Ref.
1 July 2016	CF	(Albania)	Flo Bojaj	Kilmarnock	4 January 2017	
1 July 2016	CB	(Scotland)	Will Boyle	Kilmarnock	4 January 2017	
15 July 2016	CF	(England)	Jordy Hiwula	Bradford City	End of Season	
18 August 2016	LB	(Australia)	Jason Davidson	Groningen	End of Season	
10 January 2017	CF	(Kosovo)	Florent Bojaj	Newport County	End of Season	
30 January 2017	GK	(Republic of Ireland)	Joe Murphy	Bury	End of Season	
30 January 2017	ST	(England)	Rekeil Pyke	Colchester United	End of Season	

=== Transfers out ===
Date from	Position	Nationality	Name	To	Fee	Ref.
1 July 2016	GK	(England)	Lloyd Allinson	Chesterfield (Note: Following Lloyd Allinson being release, he later signed for Chesterfield.)	Released	
1 July 2016	RW	(England)	Callum Charlton	Altrincham (Note: Following Callum Charlton being released, he later signed for Altrincham.)	Released	
1 July 2016	GK	(England)	Sam Guthrie	Free agent	Released	
1 July 2016	CM	(England)	Ben Holmes	Free agent	Released	
1 July 2016	CM	(United States)	Duane Holmes	Scunthorpe United (Note: Following Duane Holmes being released, he later signed for Scunthorpe United.)	Released	
1 July 2016	CB	(Wales)	Joel Lynch	Queens Park Rangers	Undisclosed	
1 July 2016	RW	(Algeria)	Karim Matmour	TSV 1860 Munich	Released	
1 July 2016	CF	(England)	Ishmael Miller	Bury (Note: Following Ishmael Miller being released, he later signed for Bury.)	Released	
1 July 2016	CF	(England)	James Vaughan	Birmingham City	Free transfer	
1 July 2016	GK	(Poland)	Ed Wilczynski	AFC Fylde	Released	
1 July 2016	CB	(England)	Joe Wilkinson	Buxton	Released	(Note: Following Joe Wilkinson being released, he later signed for Buxton.)
1 July 2016	CB	(Wales)	Joe Wright	Doncaster Rovers	Free transfer	
31 August 2016	FW	(Wales)	Jake Charles	Barnsley	Undisclosed	
31 August 2016	LB	(England)	Jack Senior	Luton Town	Undisclosed	
9 January 2017	CB	(Scotland)	Will Boyle	Cheltenham Town	Free transfer	
10 January 2017	DM	(Croatia)	Ivan Paurević	Ufa	Free transfer	
31 January 2017	DF	(England)	Jacob Hanson	Bradford City	Undisclosed	
19 May 2017	MF	(England)	Kyle Dempsey	Fleetwood Town	Undisclosed	

== Kit ==
The 2016–17 season was the club's fourth with technical kit supplier Puma. Pure Legal Limited, Radian B & Covonia continued their individual sponsorships of the home, away and third shirts, respectively.

For a consecutive season, the home kit featured white shorts and socks, with a return to a deeper shade of blue in the stripes along with a wide collar. The away kit kept the popular fluorescent yellow theme from the previous season, but this time the shirt included black hoops, and was paired with black shorts and socks (except for the away game at Wolves, in which it was worn with fluorescent yellow shorts and socks). The third kit was created to honour former Town full-back Ray Wilson, and its release coincided with the 50th anniversary of the 1966 World Cup Final in which Wilson played.

Supplier: Puma
Sponsor(s): Pure Legal Limited (home), Radian B (away), Covonia (third)

Home	Away	Away alt.	Third	GK (1)	GK (2)	GK (3)	GK (4)

Last updated: 5 June 2017.
Source: The English Football League Championship 2016–2017 - Historical Football kits

== Squad statistics ==
=== Appearances and goals ===
20:23, 18 January 2017 (UTC)

No.	Pos	Nat	Player	Total		Championship		FA Cup		EFL Cup		Play-offs	
No.	Pos	Nat	Player	Apps	Goals	Apps	Goals	Apps	Goals	Apps	Goals	Apps	Goals
1	GK	(Wales) WAL	Danny Ward	46	0	43	0	0	0	1	0	2	0
2	DF	(England) ENG	Tommy Smith	47	4	40+2	4	0+2	0	0	0	3	0
4	MF	(England) ENG	Dean Whitehead	20	0	10+6	0	4	0	0	0	0	0
5	DF	(England) ENG	Mark Hudson	26	0	17+5	0	4	0	0	0	0	0
6	MF	(England) ENG	Jonathan Hogg	43	1	33+4	1	0+2	0	1	0	3	0
7	MF	(Republic of Ireland) IRL	Sean Scannell	16	0	8+7	0	0	0	1	0	0	0
8	MF	(Denmark) DEN	Philip Billing	28	2	13+11	2	4	0	0	0	0	0
9	FW	(Democratic Republic of the Congo) COD	Elias Kachunga	48	13	41+1	12	1+1	0	1	1	3	0
10	MF	(Australia) AUS	Aaron Mooy	51	4	42+3	4	0+2	0	1	0	3	0
11	MF	(England) ENG	Harry Bunn	19	2	6+10	0	2+1	2	0	0	0	0
12	DF	(England) ENG	Tareiq Holmes-Dennis	15	0	7+2	0	4	0	0	0	0+2	0
13	GK	(England) ENG	Joel Coleman	10	0	3+2	0	4	0	0	0	1	0
14	DF	(England) ENG	Martin Cranie	21	0	7+7	0	4	0	1	0	0+2	0
15	DF	(Germany) GER	Chris Löwe	45	2	39+2	2	0	0	1	0	3	0
16	MF	(England) ENG	Jack Payne	28	4	10+13	2	3	2	1	0	0+1	0
17	MF	(Netherlands) NED	Rajiv van La Parra	46	2	36+4	2	1+1	0	1	0	3	0
18	MF	(England) ENG	Joe Lolley	22	1	8+11	1	3	0	0	0	0	0
19	MF	(Croatia) CRO	Ivan Paurević	2	0	0+1	0	0	0	0+1	0	0	0
21	FW	(Bermuda) BER	Nahki Wells	47	10	31+12	10	0+1	0	0	0	3	0
23	FW	(Germany) GER	Collin Quaner	22	3	9+7	2	3	1	0	0	0+3	0
26	DF	(Germany) GER	Christopher Schindler	48	2	43+1	2	0	0	1	0	3	0
27	DF	(Slovenia) SLO	Jon Gorenc Stanković	12	0	4+3	0	4	0	1	0	0	0
37	MF	(England) ENG	Isaiah Brown	21	5	12+3	4	2+1	1	0	0	3	0
44	DF	(Germany) GER	Michael Hefele	42	5	28+9	3	0+1	2	0+1	0	3	0
45	MF	(England) ENG	Kasey Palmer	27	5	16+8	4	1	1	0+1	0	0+1	0

=== Cards ===
As of 28 May 2017

Number	Nation	Position	Name	Championship		FA Cup		League Cup		Total	
Number	Nation	Position	Name	Yellow card	Red card	Yellow card	Red card	Yellow card	Red card	Yellow card	Red card
6	(England)	MF	Jonathan Hogg	9	0	0	0	1	0	10	0
44	(Germany)	DF	Michael Hefele	8	0	0	0	1	0	9	0
2	(England)	DF	Tommy Smith	8	0	0	0	0	0	8	0
15	(Germany)	DF	Chris Löwe	8	0	0	0	0	0	8	0
5	(England)	DF	Mark Hudson	6	0	1	0	0	0	7	0
9	(Democratic Republic of the Congo)	FW	Elias Kachunga	7	0	0	0	0	0	7	0
10	(Australia)	MF	Aaron Mooy	6	0	0	0	0	0	6	0
4	(England)	MF	Dean Whitehead	5	1	0	0	0	0	5	1
21	(Bermuda)	FW	Nahki Wells	5	0	0	0	0	0	5	0
45	(England)	MF	Kasey Palmer	4	0	0	0	0	0	4	0
26	(Germany)	DF	Christopher Schindler	4	0	0	0	0	0	4	0
37	(England)	MF	Izzy Brown	3	0	1	0	0	0	4	0
8	(Denmark)	MF	Philip Billing	4	0	0	0	0	0	4	0
17	(Netherlands)	MF	Rajiv van La Parra	3	1	0	0	0	0	3	1
27	(Slovenia)	DF	Jon Gorenc Stanković	2	0	1	0	0	0	3	0
23	(Germany)	FW	Collin Quaner	2	0	0	0	0	0	2	0
12	(England)	DF	Tareiq Holmes-Dennis	2	0	0	0	0	0	2	0
1	(Wales)	GK	Danny Ward	1	1	0	0	0	0	1	1
16	(England)	MF	Jack Payne	1	1	0	0	0	0	1	1
7	(Republic of Ireland)	MF	Sean Scannell	1	0	0	0	0	0	1	0
11	(England)	MF	Harry Bunn	1	0	0	0	0	0	1	0
14	(England)	DF	Martin Cranie	1	0	0	0	0	0	1	0
19	(Croatia)	MF	Ivan Paurević	0	0	0	0	1	0	1	0
			Totals	91	4	3	0	3	0	97	4

== Competitions ==
=== Pre-season friendlies ===
6 July 2016 Friendly	Guiseley	0–1	Huddersfield Town	Guiseley
19:45 BST		Report	Scannell 44'	Stadium: Nethermoor Park

9 July 2016 Friendly	Wigan Athletic	0–2	Huddersfield Town XI	Wigan
11:30 BST			J. Boyle (?), 55'	Stadium: Christopher Park

10 July 2016 Friendly	Huddersfield Town	4–1	Accrington Stanley	Huddersfield
12:00 BST	Kachunga 5'; Payne 52'; Wells 70' van La Parra 73'		? 80'	Stadium: PPG Canalside; Attendance: Behind closed doors

12 July 2016 Friendly	Huddersfield Town	2–0	Rochdale	Huddersfield
12:00 BST	Kachunga 20'; Wells 73'			Stadium: John Smith's Stadium; Attendance: Behind closed doors

16 July 2016 Friendly	Oldham Athletic	0–2	Huddersfield Town	Oldham
15:00 BST		Report	Bunn 72'; Payne 89'	Stadium: SportsDirect.com Park; Attendance: 2,163

18 July 2016 Friendly	A.F.C. Emley	0–4	Huddersfield Town XI	Emley
19:00 BST			Charles 12'; Scott 50'; Booty 54'; Colville 77'	Stadium: Welfare Ground

20 July 2016 Shankly Trophy	Huddersfield Town	0–2	Liverpool	Huddersfield
19:45 BST		Report	Grujić 32'; Moreno 90' (pen.)	Stadium: John Smith's Stadium; Attendance: 21,266; Referee: David Coote

26 July 2016 Friendly	Werder Bremen	0–0	Huddersfield Town	Zell am Ziller, Austria
17:00 BST				Stadium: Parkstadion Zell/Ziller

29 July 2016 Friendly	Ingolstadt	0–1	Huddersfield Town	Schwaz, Austria
17:30 BST		Report	Hefele 86'	Stadium: Silberstadt Arena Schwaz

30 July 2016 Friendly	West Bromwich Albion	1–0	Huddersfield Town XI	West Bromwich
12:00 BST	Campbell (?)			Stadium: West Bromwich Albion Training Ground

3 August 2016 Friendly	Guernsey	0–6	Huddersfield Town XI	Saint Peter Port, Guernsey
19:45 BST			Colville 21', 50', 57', 75'; Scott 53'; Dyson 66'	Stadium: Footes Lane; Attendance: 551

=== Overview ===
Competition	First match	Last match	Starting round	Final position	Record							
Competition	First match	Last match	Starting round	Final position	Pld	W	D	L	GF	GA	GD	Win %
EFL Championship	6 August 2016	7 May 2017	Matchday 1	5th	46	25	6	15	56	58	−2	54.35
Play-Offs	14 May 2017	29 May 2017	Semi-Finals	Final	3	0	3	0	1	1	+0	0.00
FA Cup	7 January 2017	1 March 2017	Third round	Fifth round	4	2	1	1	9	5	+4	50.00
EFL Cup	9 August 2016	9 August 2016	First round	First round	1	0	0	1	1	2	−1	0.00
Total					54	27	10	17	67	66	+1	50.00

Last updated: 29 May 2017
Source: Competitions

=== Championship ===
==== Results summary ====
Overall								Home						Away					
Pld	W	D	L	GF	GA	GD	Pts	W	D	L	GF	GA	GD	W	D	L	GF	GA	GD
46	25	6	15	56	58	−2	81	15	2	6	34	26	+8	10	4	9	22	32	−10

Last updated: 7 May 2017.

==== Results by round ====
Round	1	2	3	4	5	6	7	8	9	10	11	12	13	14	15	16	17	18	19	20	21	22	23	24	25	26	27	28	29	30	31	32	33	34	35	36	37	38	39	40	41	42	43	44	45	46
Ground	H	A	A	H	H	A	A	H	A	H	A	H	A	H	A	H	A	H	A	H	A	A	H	H	A	A	H	H	H	A	A	H	A	H	H	A	A	H	H	A	H	A	H	A	A	H
Result	W	W	D	W	W	W	L	W	L	W	W	L	L	W	L	D	L	L	D	W	W	W	W	D	W	L	W	W	W	W	W	W	D	L	W	W	L	L	W	L	W	D	L	W	L	L
Position	4	1	3	1	1	1	1	1	2	1	1	3	4	3	3	3	4	6	8	4	4	3	4	4	4	5	3	5	4	3	3	3	3	3	3	3	3	3	3	3	3	4	5	3	5	5

Updated to match(es) played on 7 May 2017. Source:
A = Away; H = Home; W = Win; D = Draw; L = Loss

==== League table ====
Pos	Team	Pld	W	D	L	GF	GA	GD	Pts	Promotion, qualification or relegation
3	Reading	46	26	7	13	68	64	+4	85	Qualification for the Championship play-offs (Note: Four teams play for one spot and promotion to the Premier League.)
4	Sheffield Wednesday	46	24	9	13	60	45	+15	81	Qualification for the Championship play-offs
5	Huddersfield Town (O, P)	46	25	6	15	56	58	−2	81	Qualification for the Championship play-offs
6	Fulham	46	22	14	10	85	57	+28	80	Qualification for the Championship play-offs
7	Leeds United	46	22	9	15	61	47	+14	75	

Source: English Football League, Soccerway
Rules for classification: 1) Points; 2) Goal difference; 3) Number of goals scored; 4) Points in head-to-head matches; 5) Goal difference in head-to-head matches; 6) Goals scored in head-to-head matches; 7) Play-off.
(O) Play-off winners; (P) Promoted

==== Matches ====
On 22 June 2016, the fixtures for the forthcoming season were announced.

6 August 2016 1	Huddersfield Town	2–1	Brentford	Huddersfield
15:00 BST	Kachunga 50'; Palmer 79'	Report	Yennaris 77'	Stadium: John Smith's Stadium; Attendance: 18,479; Referee: Geoff Eltringham

13 August 2016 2	Newcastle United	1–2	Huddersfield Town	Newcastle
15:00 BST	Gayle 60'	Report	Wells 45+1'; Payne 82'	Stadium: St James' Park; Attendance: 52,079; Referee: Oliver Langford

16 August 2016 3	Aston Villa	1–1	Huddersfield Town	Birmingham
19:45 BST	McCormack 25'	Report	Hefele 86'	Stadium: Villa Park; Attendance: 34,924; Referee: Scott Duncan

20 August 2016 4	Huddersfield Town	2–1	Barnsley	Huddersfield
15:00 BST	Löwe 27'; Hogg 90+2'	Report	Mawson 47'	Stadium: John Smith's Stadium; Attendance: 20,001; Referee: Chris Kavanagh

27 August 2016 5	Huddersfield Town	1–0	Wolverhampton Wanderers	Huddersfield
15:00 BST	van La Parra 6'	Report		Stadium: John Smith's Stadium; Attendance: 19,972; Referee: Stephen Martin

10 September 2016 6	Leeds United	0–1	Huddersfield Town	Leeds
15:00 BST		Report	Mooy 55'	Stadium: Elland Road; Attendance: 28,514; Referee: Roger East

13 September 2016 7	Brighton & Hove Albion	1–0	Huddersfield Town	Falmer
19:45 BST	Knockaert 80'	Report		Stadium: Falmer Stadium; Attendance: 24,166; Referee: Andy Woolmer

17 September 2016 8	Huddersfield Town	2–1	Queens Park Rangers	Huddersfield
17:00 BST	Palmer 14'; Kachunga 62'	Report	Sylla 76'	Stadium: John Smith's Stadium; Attendance: 20,595; Referee: Simon Hooper

24 September 2016 9	Reading	1–0	Huddersfield Town	Reading
15:00 BST	Obita (yellow card) 35'; Beerens 41'; Gunter (yellow card) 56'	Report	van La Parra (yellow card) 23' (yellow-red card) 26'; Smith (yellow card) 27'; Löwe (yellow card) 45'; Hudson (yellow card) 59'; Kachunga (yellow card) 66'	Stadium: Madejski Stadium; Attendance: 17,030; Referee: James Linington

27 September 2016 10	Huddersfield Town	2–1	Rotherham United	Huddersfield
19:45 BST	Kachunga 2'; Wells 38'; Whitehead (yellow card) 43'; Scannell (yellow card) 53'; Payne (yellow card) 87'	Report	Ward 34'; Newell (yellow card) 68'	Stadium: John Smith's Stadium; Attendance: 18,808; Referee: Stuart Attwell

1 October 2016 11	Ipswich Town	0–1	Huddersfield Town	Ipswich
15:00 BST	Douglas (yellow card) 52'	Report	Hogg (yellow card) 50'; Schindler 58'	Stadium: Portman Road; Attendance: 16,146; Referee: Chris Kavanagh

16 October 2016 12	Huddersfield Town	0–1	Sheffield Wednesday	Huddersfield
12:00 BST	Kachunga (yellow card) 38'	Report	Forestieri 68' (pen.); Hooper (yellow card) 70'; Hutchinson (yellow card) 73'	Stadium: John Smith's Stadium; Attendance: 22,368; Referee: Graham Scott

19 October 2016 13	Preston North End	3–1	Huddersfield Town	Preston
19:45 BST	Clarke 6'; Baptiste 42'; Gallagher 53'; Hugill (yellow card) 82'	Report	Hudson (yellow card) 53'; Wells 81'	Stadium: Deepdale Stadium; Attendance: 12,862; Referee: Jeremy Simpson

22 October 2016 14	Huddersfield Town	1–0	Derby County	Huddersfield
15:00 BST	Wells (yellow card) 40'; Hogg (yellow card) 57'; Kachunga 90+3'	Report	Hughes (yellow card) 65'	Stadium: John Smith's Stadium; Attendance: 19,749; Referee: Peter Bankes

29 October 2016 15	Fulham	5–0	Huddersfield Town	London
15:00 BST	Martin 8', 63' (pen.); Kalas 34'; Fredericks (yellow card) 36'; Piazon 42'; McDonald 66'	Report	Whitehead (yellow card) 30'; Palmer (yellow card) 36'	Stadium: Craven Cottage; Attendance: 19,858; Referee: David Coote

5 November 2016 16	Huddersfield Town	1–1	Birmingham City	Huddersfield
15:00 GMT	Kachunga 69'	Report	Morrison (yellow card) 38'; Jutkiewicz 73'; Shotton (yellow card) 83'	Stadium: John Smith's Stadium; Attendance: 20,200; Referee: Stephen Martin

19 November 2016 17	Cardiff City	3–2	Huddersfield Town	Cardiff
15:00 GMT	Morrison 15'; Hoilett 17'; Lambert 33'; Peltier (yellow card) 48'; Bamba (yellow card) 72'	Report	Smith 28'; Hogg (yellow card) 49'; Mooy (yellow card) 49'; Billing 70'; Hefele (yellow card) 72'; Stanković (yellow card) 80'	Stadium: Cardiff City Stadium; Attendance: 15,930; Referee: James Adcock

28 November 2016 18	Huddersfield Town	1–2	Wigan Athletic	Huddersfield
19:45 GMT	Hogg (yellow card) 18'; Mooy 50'; Smith (yellow card) 71'	Report	Warnock (yellow card) 3'; Burke 40'; Power (yellow card) 52'; Wildschut 60'; Garbutt (yellow card) 90+3'	Stadium: John Smith's Stadium; Attendance: 18,943; Referee: Tony Harrington

3 December 2016 19	Blackburn Rovers	1–1	Huddersfield Town	Blackburn
15:00 GMT	Lowe (yellow card) 13'; Graham 34' (pen.); Nyambe (yellow card) 69'; Lenihan (yellow card) 90+2'	Report	Palmer 6' (yellow card) 58'; Hefele (yellow card) 34'	Stadium: Ewood Park; Attendance: 12,034; Referee: Simon Hooper

10 December 2016 20	Huddersfield Town	2–1	Bristol City	Huddersfield
15:00 GMT	Kachunga 10' (yellow card) 85'; Schindler (yellow card) 32'; Wells 58'	Report	Freeman (yellow card) 31'; Abraham 33'; Fielding (yellow card) 49'	Stadium: John Smith's Stadium; Attendance: 18,333; Referee: Keith Stroud

13 December 2016 21	Burton Albion	0–1	Huddersfield Town	Burton-upon-Trent
19:45 GMT	Ward (yellow card) 75'; O'Grady (yellow card) 82'; Brayford (yellow card) 85'	Report	Palmer (yellow card) 59'; Hefele (yellow card) 84'; Wells 85'; Cranie (yellow card) 90+4'	Stadium: Pirelli Stadium; Attendance: 4,564; Referee: James Adcock

16 December 2016 22	Norwich City	1–2	Huddersfield Town	Norwich
19:45 GMT	Howson 6'; Pinto (yellow card) 45+2'; Dorrans (yellow card) 51'	Report	Kachunga 5', 40'; Wells (yellow card) 72'; Mooy (yellow card) 87'	Stadium: Carrow Road; Attendance: 25,275; Referee: James Linington

26 December 2016 23	Huddersfield Town	2–1	Nottingham Forest	Huddersfield
15:00 GMT	van La Parra (yellow card) 45'; Palmer 53'; Mancienne 59' (o.g.)	Report	Pereira 25'; Lichaj (yellow card) 45+1'; Mancienne (yellow card) 52' (yellow-red card) 89'; Mills (yellow card) 83'; Lam (yellow card) 86'	Stadium: John Smith's Stadium; Attendance: 22,100; Referee: Christopher Kavanagh

31 December 2016 24	Huddersfield Town	1–1	Blackburn Rovers	Huddersfield
12:30 GMT	Whitehead (yellow card) 17'; Wells 90+4'	Report	Graham 81'	Stadium: John Smith's Stadium; Attendance: 21,311; Referee: Darren Bond

2 January 2017 25	Wigan Athletic	0–1	Huddersfield Town	Wigan
15:00 GMT	Jacobs (yellow card) 68'	Report	Billing (yellow card) 12'; Mooy (yellow card) 45+2'; Holmes-Dennis (yellow card) 55'; Stanković (yellow card) 77'; Wells 80'	Stadium: DW Stadium; Attendance: 13,480; Referee: Jeremy Simpson

14 January 2017 26	Sheffield Wednesday	2–0	Huddersfield Town	Sheffield
15:00 GMT	Pudil (yellow card) 43'; Wallace 54'; Forestieri 90+2'; Palmer (yellow card) 90+7'	Report	Payne (red card) 70'; Schindler (yellow card) 90+7'	Stadium: Hillsborough; Attendance: 28,173; Referee: Graham Scott

21 January 2017 27	Huddersfield Town	2–0	Ipswich Town	Huddersfield
15:00 GMT	Brown 41'; Schindler 57'	Report	Bru (yellow card) 56'; Douglas (yellow card) 71'; Digby (yellow card) 76'; Berra (yellow card) 83'; Lawrence (yellow card) 85'	Stadium: John Smith's Stadium; Attendance: 19,113; Referee: Andy Davies

2 February 2017 28	Huddersfield Town	3–1	Brighton & Hove Albion	Huddersfield
19:45 GMT	Smith 9'; Wells 36'; Kachunga (yellow card) 45+1' (goal) 45+3'	Report	Bruno (yellow card) 1'; Hemed 20'; Dunk (yellow card) 39' (yellow-red card) 67'; Norwood (yellow card) 79'	Stadium: John Smith's Stadium; Attendance: 20,104; Referee: James Linington

5 February 2017 29	Huddersfield Town	2–1	Leeds United	Huddersfield
12:00 GMT	Brown 27'; Hefele 89'; Kachunga (yellow card) 90+2'; Wells (yellow card) 90+8'	Report	Ayling (yellow card) 19'; Wood 35'; Bartley (yellow card) 73'; Hernández (yellow card) 81'; Bridcutt (yellow card) 90+1'; Jansson (yellow card) 90+3'	Stadium: John Smith's Stadium; Attendance: 22,400; Referee: Simon Hooper

11 February 2017 30	Queens Park Rangers	1–2	Huddersfield Town	Shepherd's Bush, London
15:00 GMT	Manning (yellow card) 45+1'; Hall (yellow card) 58'; Freeman 60'; Luongo (yellow card) 85'	Report	Brown 26' (yellow card) 72'; Wells 37'	Stadium: Loftus Road; Attendance: 14,044; Referee: Peter Bankes

14 February 2017 31	Rotherham United	2–3	Huddersfield Town	Rotherham
19:45 GMT	Ajayi 11'; Adeyemi 71'	Report	Lolley 19'; Kachunga 75'; Brown (yellow card) 79'; Smith 90+2'	Stadium: AESSEAL New York Stadium; Attendance: 10,114; Referee: Stuart Attwell

21 February 2017 32	Huddersfield Town	1–0	Reading	Huddersfield
19:45 GMT	Billing 82'; Hefele (yellow card) 90'	Report	Kermorgant (yellow card) 90+2'	Stadium: John Smith's Stadium; Referee: Tony Harrington

25 February 2017 33	Barnsley	1–1	Huddersfield Town	Barnsley
15:00 GMT	Jones (yellow card) 24'; Watkins 75'; Davies (yellow card) 90+1'	Report	Hefele 18'; Mooy (yellow card) 25'; Smith (yellow card) 41'; Whitehead (yellow card) 52'; Billing (yellow card) 68'; Brown (yellow card) 90+1'	Stadium: Oakwell; Attendance: 18,075; Referee: Tim Robinson

4 March 2017 34	Huddersfield Town	1–3	Newcastle United	Huddersfield
17:30 GMT	Schindler (yellow card) 33'; Mooy 72' (pen.)	Report	Ritchie 10' (pen.); Murphy 32'; Colback (yellow card) 35'; Anita (yellow card) 45+2'; Clark (yellow card) 46'; Shelvey (yellow card) 61'; Gayle 90+1'	Stadium: John Smith's Stadium; Attendance: 23,213; Referee: Roger East

7 March 2017 35	Huddersfield Town	1–0	Aston Villa	Huddersfield
19:45 GMT	Löwe (yellow card) 26'; Mooy (yellow card) 67'; Smith 69'; Quaner (yellow card) 87'	Report	Jedinak (yellow card) 29'; Taylor (yellow card) 64'; Baker (yellow card) 83'; Kodjia (yellow card) 85'	Stadium: John Smith's Stadium; Attendance: 20,584; Referee: Darren Bond

11 March 2017 36	Brentford	0–1	Huddersfield Town	Brentford
15:00 GMT			van La Parra 28'	Stadium: Griffin Park

17 March 2017 37	Bristol City	4–0	Huddersfield Town	Bristol
19:45 GMT	Tomlin 30'; Abraham 45+13'; Flint 79'; Cotterill 83' (pen.)	Report	Billing (yellow card) 52'	Stadium: Ashton Gate Stadium; Attendance: 16,984; Referee: David Coote

1 April 2017 38	Huddersfield Town	0–1	Burton Albion	Huddersfield
15:00 GMT	Whitehead (yellow card) 27' (yellow-red card) 88'; Löwe (yellow card) 90+1'	Report	McFadzean (yellow card) 49'; Brayford (yellow card) 74'; Sordell (yellow card) 79'; Turner (yellow card) 82'; Flanagan (yellow card) 88'; Mousinho (yellow card) 90+4'; Irvine 90+5'	Stadium: John Smith's Stadium; Attendance: 20,154; Referee: Scott Duncan

5 April 2017 39	Huddersfield Town	3–0	Norwich City	Huddersfield
19:45 GMT	Hefele (yellow card) 42'; Kachunga 66'; Mooy 70'; Wells 73'	Report	Tettey (yellow card) 10'; Martin (yellow card) 36'; Howson (yellow card) 78'	Stadium: John Smith's Stadium; Attendance: 18,706; Referee: Christopher Kavanagh

8 April 2017 40	Nottingham Forest	2–0	Huddersfield Town	Nottingham
15:00 BST	Lichaj (yellow card) 31' (goal) 32'; Ward 57'	Report	Wells (yellow card) 44'; Whitehead (yellow card) 78'	Stadium: City Ground; Attendance: 20,411; Referee: Tim Robinson

14 April 2017 41	Huddersfield Town	3–2	Preston North End	Huddersfield
15:00 BST	Kachunga 43'; Löwe (yellow card) 58'; Payne 70'; Quaner 90+6'	Report	McGeady 23'; Pearson (yellow card) 58'; Vermijl (yellow card) 61'; Huntington (yellow card) 61'; Hugill 79' (yellow card) 90+3'; Maxwell (yellow card) 90+5'	Stadium: John Smith's Stadium; Attendance: 21,254; Referee: Lee Probert

17 April 2017 42	Derby County	1–1	Huddersfield Town	Derby
17:00 BST	Camara (yellow card) 77'; Butterfield 88'	Report	Quaner 9' van La Parra (yellow card) 45'; Hefele (yellow card) 85'	Stadium: Pride Park; Attendance: 29,031; Referee: Darren Bond

22 April 2017 43	Huddersfield Town	1–4	Fulham	Huddersfield
15:00 BST	Löwe 5' (pen.); Billing (yellow card) 26'	Report	Malone 16'; Fredericks (yellow card) 18'; Odoi (yellow card) 50'; Cairney 20' (pen.); Johansen 36', 45'	Stadium: John Smith's Stadium; Attendance: 21,203; Referee: Andy Davies

25 April 2017 44	Wolverhampton Wanderers	0–1	Huddersfield Town	Wolverhampton
19:45 BST	Price (yellow card) 27'; Iorfa (yellow card) 43'; Sílvio (yellow card) 68'	Report	Brown 31'	Stadium: Molineux Stadium; Attendance: 17,505; Referee: Tim Robinson

29 April 2017 45	Birmingham City	2–0	Huddersfield Town	Birmingham
15:00 BST	Adams (red card) 23'; Grounds 41' (yellow card) 64'; Gardner 76' (pen.); Davis (yellow card) 90+1'	Report	Holmes-Dennis (yellow card) 32'; Quaner (yellow card) 57'	Stadium: St Andrew's; Attendance: 26,914; Referee: Mike Jones

7 May 2017 46	Huddersfield Town	0–3	Cardiff City	Huddersfield
12:00 BST	Ward (red card) 20'	Report	Zohore 7'; Bennett 29', 71'; Richards (yellow card) 75'	Stadium: John Smith's Stadium; Attendance: 20,583; Referee: Jeremy Simpson

==== Play-offs ====
14 May 2017 Semi-Final 1st Leg	Huddersfield Town	0–0	Sheffield Wednesday	Huddersfield
12:00 BST	Smith (yellow card) 28'	Report	Wallace (yellow card) 34'; Hunt (yellow card) 61'; Jones (yellow card) 74'; Reach (yellow card) 90'	Stadium: John Smith's Stadium; Attendance: 20,357; Referee: Paul Tierney

17 May 2017 Semi-Final 2nd Leg	Sheffield Wednesday	1–1 (a.e.t.) (1–1 agg.) (3–4 p)	Huddersfield Town	Sheffield
19:45 BST	Hutchinson (yellow card) 24'; Fletcher 51'; Bannan (yellow card) 87'	Report	Hogg (yellow card) 44'; Hefele (yellow card) 63'; Lees 73' (o.g.)	Stadium: Hillsborough Stadium; Attendance: 32,625; Referee: Andre Marriner
	Penalties
	Hutchinson (penalty missed); Bannan (penalty scored); Lee (penalty scored); Hunt (penalty scored); Forestieri (penalty missed)		Löwe (penalty scored); Hefele (penalty scored); Wells (penalty scored); Mooy (penalty scored); Payne (penalty missed)

29 May 2017 Final	Huddersfield Town	0–0 (a.e.t.) (4–3 p)	Reading	Wembley, London
15:00 BST	Hogg (yellow card) 29'; Kachunga (yellow card) 61'; Smith (yellow card) 75'	Report	van den Berg (yellow card) 17'; Kermorgant (yellow card) 19'; Obita (yellow card) 105'	Stadium: Wembley Stadium; Attendance: 76,682; Referee: Neil Swarbrick
	Penalties
	Löwe (penalty scored); Hefele (penalty missed); Wells (penalty scored); Mooy (penalty scored); Schindler (penalty scored)		Kermorgant (penalty scored); Williams (penalty scored); Kelly (penalty scored); Moore (penalty missed); Obita (penalty missed)

=== FA Cup ===
7 January 2017 Third round	Huddersfield Town	4–0	Port Vale	Huddersfield
15:00 GMT	Payne 28', 84'; Palmer 73'; Bunn 80'	Report		Stadium: The John Smith's Stadium; Attendance: 11,715; Referee: Geoff Eltringham

28 January 2017 Fourth round	Rochdale	0–4	Huddersfield Town	Rochdale
15:00 GMT	McGahey (yellow card) 66'	Report	Quaner 42'; Brown (yellow card) 51' (goal) 66' (pen.); Hefele 72', 84'	Stadium: Spotland Stadium; Attendance: 7,431; Referee: Oliver Langford

18 February 2017 Fifth round	Huddersfield Town	0–0	Manchester City	Huddersfield
15:00 GMT		Report	Kolarov (yellow card) 25'	Stadium: The John Smith's Stadium; Attendance: 24,129; Referee: Anthony Taylor

1 March 2017 Replay	Manchester City	5–1	Huddersfield Town	Manchester
19:45 GMT	Sané 30'; Agüero 34' (pen.), 74'; Zabaleta 38'; Iheanacho 90+1'	Report	Bunn 7'; Hudson (yellow card) 15'; Stanković (yellow card) 34'	Stadium: City of Manchester Stadium; Attendance: 42,425; Referee: Paul Tierney

=== EFL Cup ===
On 22 June 2016, the first round draw was made, Huddersfield Town were drawn away against Shrewsbury Town.

9 August 2016 Round 1	Shrewsbury Town	2–1	Huddersfield Town	Shrewsbury
19:45 BST	Leitch-Smith 1'; Dodds 77'		Kachunga 39'	Stadium: Greenhous Meadow; Attendance: 2,862; Referee: Graham Salisbury
