= 2017 EFL Championship play-off final =

Association football match in London

- The match was played at Wembley Stadium.
- Event: 2016–17 EFL Championship
Huddersfield Town	Reading
0	0
- After extra time Huddersfield Town won 4–3 on penalties
- Date: 29 May 2017
- Venue: Wembley Stadium, London
- Man of the Match: Aaron Mooy (Huddersfield Town)
- Referee: Neil Swarbrick (Lancashire)
- Attendance: 76,682

The 2017 EFL Championship play-off final was an association football match that was played on 29 May 2017 at Wembley Stadium, London, between Huddersfield Town and Reading. The match determined the third and final team to gain promotion from the EFL Championship, the second tier of English football, to the Premier League. The top two teams of the 2016–17 EFL Championship season gained automatic promotion to the Premier League, while the teams placed from third to sixth place in the table partook in play-off semi-finals; Reading finished in third place while Huddersfield ended the season in fifth position. The winners of these ties competed for the final place for the 2017–18 season in the Premier League. Sheffield Wednesday and Fulham were the losing semi-finalists. Winning the play-off final was estimated to be worth £170 million through sponsorship and television deals to the successful team.

The game, which was refereed by Neil Swarbrick, was played in front of a crowd of 76,682. It ended goalless in regular time and the deadlock was not broken by the end of extra time. A penalty shootout was required to determine the winner for the third time in the history of the second tier play-off final. Although Michael Hefele was the first to miss, Reading's Liam Moore's shot was wayward and Jordan Obita's attempt was saved by Danny Ward, leaving Christopher Schindler to score the winning penalty for the Terriers. Huddersfield won the final 4–3 on penalties, and their midfielder Aaron Mooy was selected as the man of the match.

The following season, Huddersfield's first back in the top tier of English football since 1972, saw them finish 16th in the Premier League. Reading ended the 2017–18 EFL Championship season in 20th position, three points above the relegation zone.

== Route to the final ==
Football League Championship final table, leading positions
Pos	Team	Pld	W	D	L	GF	GA	GD	Pts
1	Newcastle United	46	29	7	10	85	40	+45	94
2	Brighton & Hove Albion	46	28	9	9	74	40	+34	93
3	Reading	46	26	7	13	68	64	+4	85
4	Sheffield Wednesday	46	24	9	13	60	45	+15	81
5	Huddersfield Town	46	25	6	15	56	58	−2	81
6	Fulham	46	22	14	10	85	57	+28	80

Reading F.C. finished the regular 2016–17 season in third place in the EFL Championship, the second tier of the English football league system, two places ahead of Huddersfield Town. Both therefore missed out on the two automatic places for promotion to the Premier League and instead took part in the play-offs to determine the third promoted team. Reading finished four points behind Brighton & Hove Albion (who were promoted in second place) and nine behind league winners Newcastle United. Huddersfield ended the season four points behind Reading, and were the only club in the top eleven to have a negative goal difference.

Reading faced Fulham in their play-off semi-final and the first leg was played away at Craven Cottage. The match ended 1–1, with goals from Jordan Obita for Reading and Fulham's Tom Cairney. With ten minutes of the game remaining, Reading's defender Paul McShane was shown a straight red for a foul on Kevin McDonald. In the second leg, Reading won 1–0 at their home ground, the Madejski Stadium, with a penalty scored by Yann Kermorgant after Fulham's Tomáš Kalas had handled the ball. This gave them a 2–1 aggregate victory and qualification for the play-off final. Ali Al-Habsi, the Reading goalkeeper, made a number of saves to keep a clean sheet and was praised by his manager Jaap Stam: "It was a terrific performance. That's why he's paid to be in goal and be our last line of defence".

Huddersfield Town went into their first leg match against Sheffield Wednesday having failed to beat them in their last seven encounters. The game ended in a draw at Huddersfield's home ground, the Kirklees Stadium, despite Huddersfield's domination in possession and shots. The second leg finished 1–1 after extra time, as Wednesday scored first through Steven Fletcher only for Tom Lees to score an own goal to equalise for Huddersfield Town. The resulting penalty shoot-out finished 4–3 in Huddersfield's favour with their goalkeeper, Danny Ward saving two Wednesday penalties, from Sam Hutchinson and Fernando Forestieri. Prior to the game, Hudderfield's German manager David Wagner had joked: "everyone knows Germans are able to win penalties".

Reading			Round	Huddersfield Town
Opponent	Result	Legs	Semi-finals	Opponent	Result	Legs
Fulham	2–1	1–1 away; 1–0 home		Sheffield Wednesday	1–1 (4–3 p.)	0–0 home; 1–1 (a.e.t.) away

== Match ==
=== Background ===
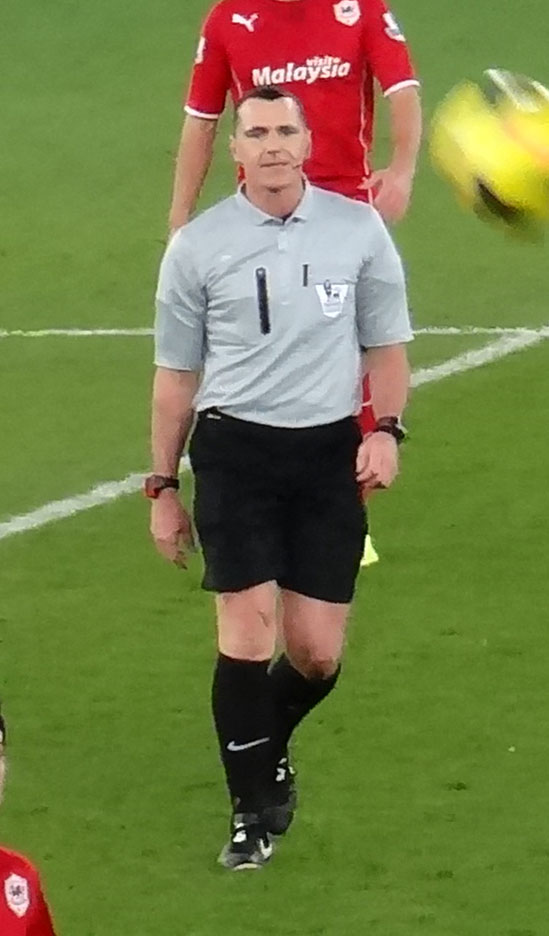
Neil Swarbrick (pictured in 2013) was the referee for the match.

Reading's last appearance in the play-off final had been in 2011 when they lost 4–2 to Swansea City. Reading had never won a play-off competition, having previously lost to Bolton Wanderers in the 1995 First Division play-off final and to Walsall in the 2001 Second Division play-off final. Reading had also lost in the second-tier play-off semi-finals in 2003 and 2009. Huddersfield had an extensive history in the play-offs, including four appearances in the finals: promotions from the second tier in 1995 and from the third tier in 2004 and 2012, having lost the previous season. Prior to the 2017 final, Huddersfield had played twenty-two matches in league play-offs, winning eight, drawing eight and losing six. During the regular season, both teams had won their home fixtures against one another, with a 1–0 win for Reading in September and a win by the same scoreline in February for Huddersfield. The German-born Elias Kachunga was Huddersfield's top scorer for the season with 12 goals, while Reading's Kermorgant was his team's most prolific striker having scored 18 times prior to the semi-finals. Reading had last been in the top flight of English football in 2013 while Huddersfield had last experienced football at the highest domestic tier in the 1971–72 season.

Reading were without captain Paul McShane who was shown a straight red card in their play-off semi-final first leg game at Fulham. Other than Jordan Obita being named among the substitutes, Reading named the same team as for their previous match. Huddersfield's starting line up was unchanged from their semi-final second leg, including Elias Kachunga who had recovered from a hamstring injury suffered in the second leg of the semi-final.

The final was refereed by Neil Swarbrick from the Lancashire County Football Association, with assistant referees Jake Collin and Darren Cann, while Stuart Attwell acted as the fourth official. It was widely reported that the game was worth at around £170 million over three years to the winners through sponsorship and television deals. Reading were allocated 38,342 tickets for the final in the eastern half of Wembley Stadium, with Huddersfield being allocated the western half of the ground. Ticket prices ranged from £36 to £98 for adults, with concessions being half price. Huddersfield were considered favourites by the media and bookmakers to win the match, which was broadcast in the UK on Sky Sports. Before the match commenced, a minute's silence was held to commemorate the victims of the Manchester Arena bombing.

=== First half ===
Kermorgant kicked off for Reading at 3:04 p.m. in front of a crowd of 76,682. In the 4th minute, Huddersfield won a free kick which was taken by Aaron Mooy but the resulting cross was headed wide by Michael Hefele. The Yorkshire club dominated the early stages and in the 11th minute a cross to the far post from Kachunga was struck wide of the post by Izzy Brown from three yards. Two minutes later, Lewis Grabban's shot passed wide of Huddersfield's post. Kachunga was then brought down by Joey van den Berg who received the first yellow card of the game from the referee Neil Swarbrick. Two minutes later Kermorgant was also booked, for a foul on the Huddersfield captain Tommy Smith. Midway through the first half, Kermogant found Chris Gunter, who needed treatment after he was tackled strongly by Chris Löwe. In the 28th minute, Jonathan Hogg fouled Danny Williams and received the third yellow card of the game. Five minutes later Mooy brought down Kermorgant and was awarded a free kick, which John Swift struck wide of the Huddersfield goal from 35 yards. The half ended goalless with Reading dominant in possession but Huddersfield having the better chances to score.

=== Second half ===
Early in the second half, a shot from Löwe from distance was caught by Reading's Al-Habsi. Two minutes later, Swift was put through on goal by George Evans but his shot was saved by the Huddersfield goalkeeper Ward. In the 54th minute, a deep Van den Berg corner was hooked over the bar by Kermogant. Reading had the majority of the second half possession and won a free-kick wide on the left after Kachunga fouled Tyler Blackett. The cross into the box was punched clear by Ward. In the 60th minute Kachunga was booked for dissent. A minute later Hefele was brought down in the area by Van den Berg but Huddersfield's appeals for a penalty were turned down. The first substitution of the game was made in the 64th minute as Reading's Obita came on to replace Van den Berg. Two minutes later, Huddersfield made their first substitution with Collin Quaner coming on for Kachunga. Chances for both sides followed before Grabban was replaced by Garath McCleary in the 74th minute. Smith was then booked for a foul on Williams before a snatched shot by Quaner from a Mooy cross, intended for Nahki Wells, went wide. In the 82nd minute, a shot from Tiago Ilori after a cross by Obita was deflected out by Hefele. With three minutes of normal time remaining, Smith was stretchered off the pitch after a challenge from Kermogant, and was replaced by Martin Cranie. Two minutes into the seven minutes of injury time, Gunter headed over the bar from a McCleary cross. A late shot from Swift went wide and with seconds remaining, a low shot from Wells was well covered by Al-Habsi. The half ended goalless sending the match into extra time.

=== Extra time and penalties ===
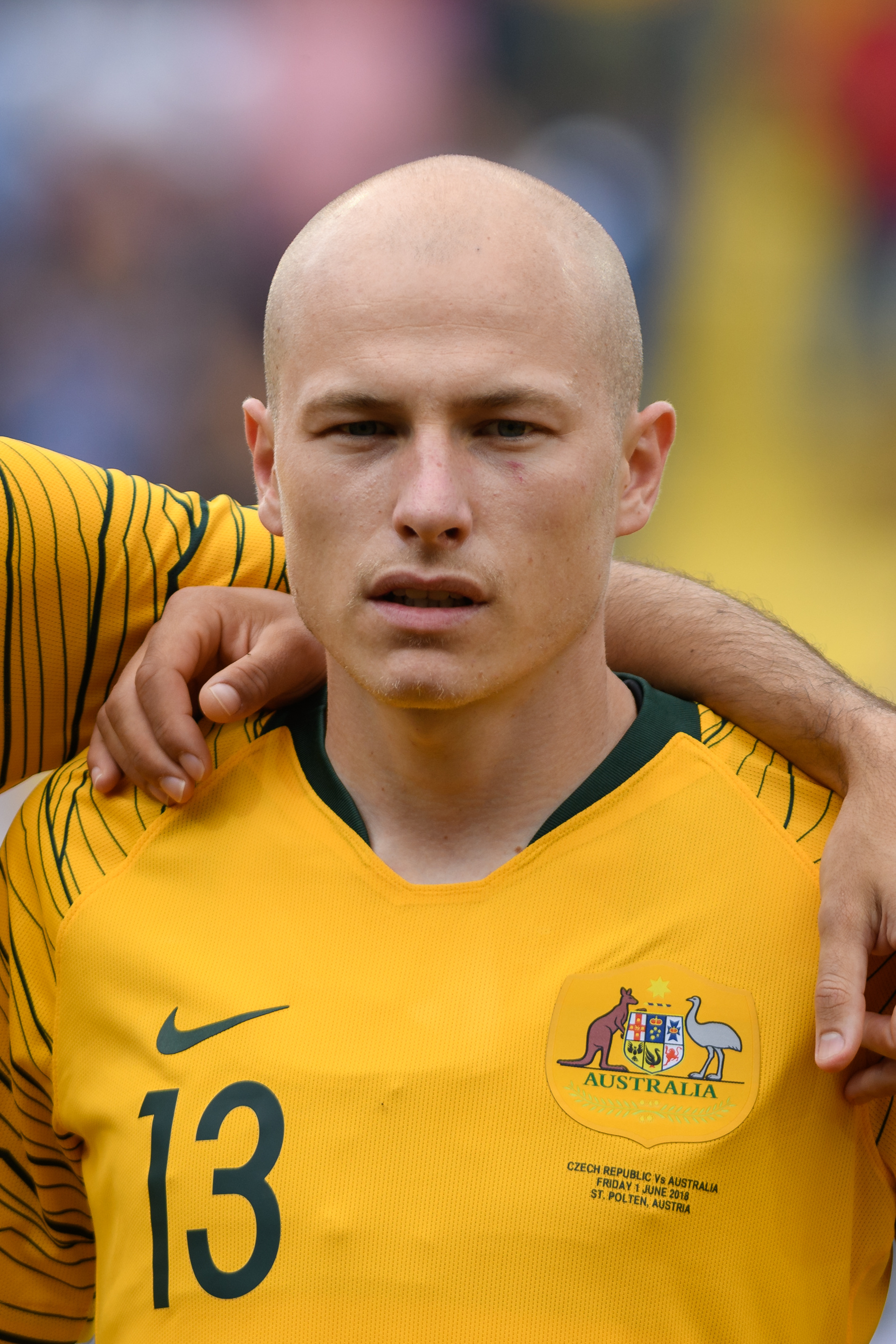
Aaron Mooy (pictured in 2018 lining up for Australia) scored Huddersfield's fourth penalty and was named man of the match.

Huddersfield kicked off the first period of extra time and within two minutes, a header from Brown header was cleared by the Reading defender Liam Moore. Once again Reading dominated possession but made few chances. After eight minutes, Huddersfield made their final substitution with Kasey Palmer replacing Brown, with Reading's Liam Kelly coming on for Swift two minutes later. Al-Habsi then stopped a Rajiv van La Parra chance before McCleary shot high and wide past the Huddersfield goal. Obita was then booked for what Barry Glendenning of The Guardian referred to as a "rugby tackle" on Quaner. In the last action of the first half of extra time, Kelly played McCleary in only for him to shoot wide of the right post; the half ended 0–0. Reading started the second half of extra time but Huddersfield enjoyed the early possession with missed chances from Hefele and Van La Parra. With three minutes of extra time remaining, Palmer passed to Wells just inside the Reading penalty area but his shot was wide of the left post. A last-minute free kick from Löwe came to nothing and extra time ended goalless, sending the second tier play-off final to a penalty shootout for the third time ever.

Penalties were taken at the Huddersfield end, with Reading's Kermorgant commencing the shootout. Ward dived the right way but Kermogant's shot was too good. Löwe stepped up to equalise the shootout with a low, hard shot. Williams' strike was down the centre, narrowly missed by Ward's feet, to regain Reading's lead. Next for Huddersfield was Hefele whose weak strike was saved by Al-Habsi, keeping the score 2–1 to Reading. The third penalty for Reading was taken by Kelly who struck the ball high into Ward's net, while Huddersfield scored their second with a well placed strike from Wells. Moore's spot kick went over the bar and Mooy equalised the shootout at 3–3 after four penalties each. Obita's shot was then saved by Ward, allowing Christopher Schindler to strike the winning penalty, securing Huddersfield's promotion to the Premier League with a 4–3 penalty win.

=== Details ===
29 May 2017
15:00

Huddersfield Town	0–0 (a.e.t.)	Reading
	Report
Penalties
Löwe (penalty scored); Hefele (penalty missed); Wells (penalty scored); Mooy (penalty scored); Schindler (penalty scored)	4–3	(penalty scored) Kermorgant; (penalty scored) Williams; (penalty scored) Kelly; (penalty missed) Moore; (penalty missed) Obita

Wembley Stadium, London
Attendance: 76,682
Referee: Neil Swarbrick

Huddersfield Town	Reading

1	(Wales) Danny Ward
2	(England) Tommy Smith	(yellow card) 75'	(substituted off) 88'
44	(Germany) Michael Hefele
26	(Germany) Christopher Schindler
15	(Germany) Chris Löwe
6	(England) Jonathan Hogg	(yellow card) 29'
10	(Australia) Aaron Mooy
9	(Democratic Republic of the Congo) Elias Kachunga	(yellow card) 61'	(substituted off) 66'
37	(England) Izzy Brown		(substituted off) 98'
17	(Netherlands) Rajiv van La Parra
21	(Bermuda) Nahki Wells
Substitutes:
13	(England) Joel Coleman
5	(England) Mark Hudson
12	(England) Tareiq Holmes-Dennis
14	(England) Martin Cranie		(substituted on) 88'
4	(England) Dean Whitehead
45	(England) Kasey Palmer		(substituted on) 98'
23	(Germany) Collin Quaner		(substituted on) 66'
Manager:
(Germany) David Wagner

26	(Oman) Ali Al-Habsi
2	(Wales) Chris Gunter
20	(Portugal) Tiago Ilori
16	(England) Liam Moore
4	(Netherlands) Joey van den Berg	(yellow card) 17'	(substituted off) 64'
24	(England) Tyler Blackett
6	(England) George Evans
23	(United States) Danny Williams
8	(England) John Swift		(substituted off) 100'
18	(France) Yann Kermorgant	(yellow card) 19'
50	(England) Lewis Grabban		(substituted off) 74'
Substitutes:
31	(Finland) Anssi Jaakkola
11	(England) Jordan Obita	(yellow card) 105'	(substituted on) 64'
25	(Romania) Adrian Popa
7	(Netherlands) Roy Beerens
12	(Jamaica) Garath McCleary		(substituted on) 74'
38	(Republic of Ireland) Liam Kelly		(substituted on) 100'
9	(France) Joseph Mendes
Manager:
(Netherlands) Jaap Stam

Man of the Match:
Aaron Mooy (Huddersfield Town)

=== Statistics ===
Statistics
	Huddersfield Town	Reading
Goals scored	0	0
Shots on target	2	1
Shots off target	8	10
Fouls committed	12	12
Corner kicks	7	4
Yellow cards	3	3
Red cards	0	0

== Post-match ==
It was the first time since the play-off format was introduced in 1987 that a final ended goalless. Huddersfield's coach Wagner stated: "we said no limits and now we know what our limits are – the Premier League". He went on to call his players "legends for sure. Everybody will remember what this group of players have done with a small budget. And they deserve it. This football club has written an unbelievable story". Schindler, the winning penalty-taker, said: "I think nobody's feeling 100% confident under this pressure, but you have to do it". Aaron Mooy was named the man of the match; according to BBC reporter Ian Woodcock, Mooy "has been incredibly influential throughout the season and his energy and guile drove his side forward for 120 minutes". Reading's captain Chris Gunter observed: "nobody knows what to say to each other ... the first thing is to make sure that this manager is in charge for the first game of next season".

Huddersfield's first season back in the top tier of English football since 1972 saw them end the Premier League in 16th place, four points ahead of the relegation zone. It was described by Paul Doyle in The Guardian as "the Premier League's greatest survival story", with Wagner in particular noted as "a leader of rare charisma and intelligence". Reading finished the 2017–18 EFL Championship season in 20th position, three points above the relegation places, with Stam leaving the club in March 2018 after a run of one win in eighteen games.
