= Tommy Smith (footballer, born 1992) =

English footballer (born 1992)

Personal information
- Full name: Thomas George Smith
- Date of birth: 14 April 1992 (age 34)
- Place of birth: Warrington, England
- Height: 6 ft 1 in (1.86 m)
- Position: Right back

Youth career
- 2000–2004: Tranmere Rovers
- 2004–2012: Manchester City
- 2012: Helsby
- 2012–2013: Huddersfield Town

Senior career*
Years	Team	Apps	(Gls)
2013–2019	Huddersfield Town	182	(4)
2019–2022	Stoke City	97	(3)
2022–2025	Middlesbrough	42	(0)
Total		321	(7)
- * Club domestic league appearances and goals as of 10:55 05 February 2025 (UTC)

Thomas George Smith (born 14 April 1992) is an English former professional footballer who played as a right back.

Smith began his career with Huddersfield Town after coming through the youth teams at Tranmere Rovers and Manchester City. He established himself as a regular with the Terriers and captained the club to victory over Reading in the 2017 EFL Championship play-off final. Huddersfield's first season in the Premier League saw them escape relegation but they finished bottom the following season. In July 2019 Smith joined Stoke City for an undisclosed fee and then in 2022 joined Middlesbrough. Smith retired from football in February 2025 due to an ankle injury.

== Early life and career ==
Smith was born in Warrington, Cheshire and grew up in Helsby where he attended Helsby High School. He joined the Tranmere Rovers academy at the age of seven after being spotted playing in a local summer tournament.

He spent four years at Tranmere before he joined Manchester City's Academy based at Platt Lane at the age of 11. After gaining his YTS and going on to sign his first professional contract, Smith then suffered some serious injuries. He broke his leg playing against Bolton Wanderers in 2010 which ruled him out for 12 months and on his return he was hampered by a persistent ankle ligament damage and he was informed by academy manager Andy Welsh that his contract would not be renewed. He left Manchester City in January 2012 after his contract was terminated by mutual consent.

He had unsuccessful trials with Bradford City and Cheltenham Town and French side Le Havre. Smith then joined his local non-league side Helsby where his father was manager of the under-16 side. He helped Helsby gain promotion from the West Cheshire League Division Three to Division Two. After trial spells with Oxford United and Stevenage, Smith signed for Huddersfield Town's under-21 team after being approached by Steve Eyre, his former coach at Man City.

== Career ==
=== Huddersfield Town ===
Smith's first involvement with the first team came on 5 January 2013 when he was an unused substitute in Huddersfield's 1–0 away win over Charlton Athletic in the FA Cup. He made his debut on 24 September 2013 when starting the League Cup match away to Hull City, which Huddersfield lost 1–0. He made his league debut on 23 November 2013 as a starter in a 2–1 away win over Sheffield Wednesday. Smith signed a new contract with Huddersfield on 4 February 2014, which would keep him at the club until June 2016. Smith played 27 times in 2013–14 as Huddersfield finished in 17th.

On 31 January 2015, Smith was airlifted to hospital with a head injury after colliding with the Huddersfield goalkeeper, Joe Murphy, during a 2–1 home defeat to Leeds United. He was discharged the following day. He made 44 appearances in 2014–15 as Town again finished in mid-table. His first goal for Huddersfield came on 19 January 2016 in their 5–2 away defeat to Reading in the FA Cup. Huddersfield now under the management of David Wagner had an uneventful 2015–16 campaign finishing in a lowly 19th.

In August 2016 Smith signed a new contract with the Terriers keeping him contracted at the Kirklees Stadium until the summer of 2019. The 2016–17 season proved to be a successful one for Huddersfield as they reached the Championship play-off final, Smith scoring four goals in 47 games. Smith captained the team on 29 May in the 2017 EFL Championship play-off final against Reading, which Huddersfield won 4–3 on penalties after a 0–0 extra-time draw. This meant Huddersfield were promoted to Premier League for the first time, and would play top-flight football for the first time in 45 years.

In August 2017, he was appointed as Huddersfield's permanent club captain after the retirement of Mark Hudson. Huddersfield were tipped by many pundits as relegation favorites going into the 2017–18 season. They beat Crystal Palace 3–0 on the opening day of the season. After being a regular in the side in the first half of the season he missed most of the second after suffering a torn hamstring in December 2017. He returned towards the end of the campaign as Huddersfield secured their safety in the Premier League finishing in 16th. Smith drifted in and out of the side in 2018–19 due to the competition posed by Florent Hadergjonaj, making 16 appearances under Wagner and Jan Siewert as the team had a miserable campaign winning only three of their 38 matches and were relegated to the Championship.

=== Stoke City ===
Smith signed for Championship club Stoke City on 15 July 2019 on a three-year contract for an undisclosed fee. Smith made his debut on the opening day of the 2019–20 season in a 2–1 defeat against Queens Park Rangers. The team made a bad start to the season under Nathan Jones and following an EFL Cup defeat at Crawley Town in September, Smith lost his place to Tom Edwards. Jones was replaced by Michael O'Neill in November and Smith became the regular right-back in the side for the remainder of the season. Smith played 32 times in 2019–20, as Stoke successfully avoided relegation and finished in 15th position. Smith made 41 appearances in 2020–21 as Stoke finished in 14th position. He scored twice during the campaign which came against Barnsley in October and on the final day of the season against Bournemouth. Smith made 33 appearances in the 2021–22 as Stoke again finished in 14th position and at the end of the season Smith's contract was not renewed.

=== Middlesbrough ===
After training with the club through pre-season, Smith signed a one-year contract with Middlesbrough on 27 July 2022. On 22 February 2023, Smith signed a two-year contract extension, having played every minute under manager Michael Carrick. During a 1–0 victory over Birmingham City on 21 October 2023, Smith suffered a ruptured Achilles tendon that would see him miss the remainder of the season. After 15 months of rehabilitation and treatments Smith announced his retirement on 5 February 2025.

== Career statistics ==
Appearances and goals by club, season and competition
Club	Season	League			FA Cup		League Cup		Other		Total	
Club	Season	Division	Apps	Goals	Apps	Goals	Apps	Goals	Apps	Goals	Apps	Goals
Huddersfield Town	2012–13	Championship	0	0	0	0	0	0	—		0	0
Huddersfield Town	2013–14	Championship	24	0	2	0	1	0	—		27	0
Huddersfield Town	2014–15	Championship	41	0	1	0	2	0	—		44	0
Huddersfield Town	2015–16	Championship	36	0	2	1	1	0	—		39	1
Huddersfield Town	2016–17	Championship	42	4	2	0	0	0	3 (Note: Appearances in Championship play-offs)	0	47	4
Huddersfield Town	2017–18	Premier League	24	0	3	0	0	0	—		27	0
Huddersfield Town	2018–19	Premier League	15	0	0	0	1	0	—		16	0
Huddersfield Town	Total		182	4	10	1	5	0	3	0	200	5
Stoke City	2019–20	Championship	30	0	0	0	2	0	—		32	0
Stoke City	2020–21	Championship	35	2	1	0	5	0	—		41	2
Stoke City	2021–22	Championship	32	1	1	0	0	0	—		33	1
Stoke City	Total		97	3	2	0	7	0	—		106	3
Middlesbrough	2022–23	Championship	36	0	1	0	1	0	2	0	40	0
Middlesbrough	2023–24	Championship	6	0	0	0	1	0	—		7	0
Middlesbrough	2024–25	Championship	0	0	0	0	0	0	—		0	0
Middlesbrough	Total		42	0	1	0	2	0	2	0	47	0
Career total			321	7	13	1	14	0	5	0	353	8

== Honours ==
Huddersfield Town

- EFL Championship play-offs: 2017
