= Izzy Brown =

English footballer (born 1997)

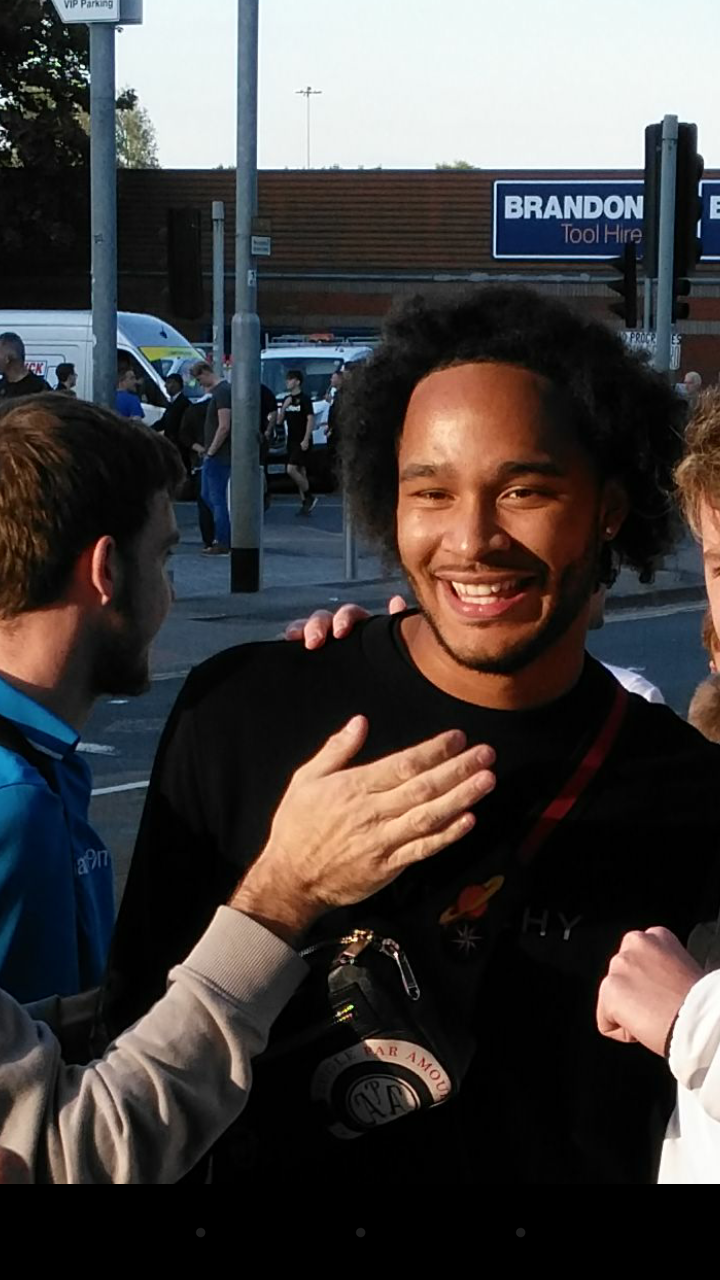
- Brown posing with Leeds fans outside Elland Road

Personal information
- Full name: Isaiah Jay Brown
- Date of birth: 7 January 1997 (age 29)
- Place of birth: Peterborough, England
- Height: 6 ft 0 in (1.82 m)
- Positions: Attacking midfielder; forward; winger

Youth career
- 2011: Leicester City
- 2011–2013: West Bromwich Albion

Senior career*
Years	Team	Apps	(Gls)
2013	West Bromwich Albion	1	(0)
2013–2021	Chelsea	1	(0)
2015–2016	→ Vitesse (loan)	22	(1)
2016–2017	→ Rotherham United (loan)	20	(3)
2017	→ Huddersfield Town (loan)	15	(4)
2017–2018	→ Brighton & Hove Albion (loan)	13	(0)
2018–2019	→ Leeds United (loan)	1	(0)
2019–2020	→ Luton Town (loan)	25	(1)
2020–2021	→ Sheffield Wednesday (loan)	19	(0)
2021–2022	Preston North End	0	(0)
Total		117	(9)

International career
2012–2013	England U16	2	(1)
2012–2014	England U17	16	(4)
2014–2016	England U19	16	(5)
2016	England U20	2	(1)
- * Club domestic league appearances and goals as of 19:30, 13 April 2021 (UTC)

Isaiah "Izzy" Jay Brown (born 7 January 1997) is an English former professional footballer who played as an attacking midfielder. He represented the England national under-20 team.

Brown played for West Bromwich Albion's academy and under-21 teams before making his senior debut in 2013.

== Early life ==
Brown was born in Peterborough, Cambridgeshire.

== Club career ==
=== West Bromwich Albion ===
On 2 March 2013, Brown made the West Bromwich Albion bench for the first time in an away league match against Chelsea, an unused substitute as West Brom lost 1–0. On 6 April 2013, again Brown made the bench and was again not used as West Brom lost 2–1 to Arsenal at The Hawthorns.

Brown made his debut for West Bromwich Albion on 4 May 2013 in a 3–2 home Premier League defeat by Wigan Athletic, replacing Youssouf Mulumbu for the last four minutes and becoming the second-youngest player in Premier League history at the age of 16 years and 117 days.

On 8 July 2013, West Bromwich Albion rejected an offer for Brown from Chelsea. Later that month, Chelsea confirmed that they had signed Brown, with compensation between the clubs reportedly set to be decided by a tribunal. After Brown left the club West Brom's chairman considered scrapping the club's category one development academy as the EPPP rules Chelsea used to sign Brown meant that the club were losing their best prospects for nominal fees that failed to cover the cost of running an academy.

=== Chelsea ===
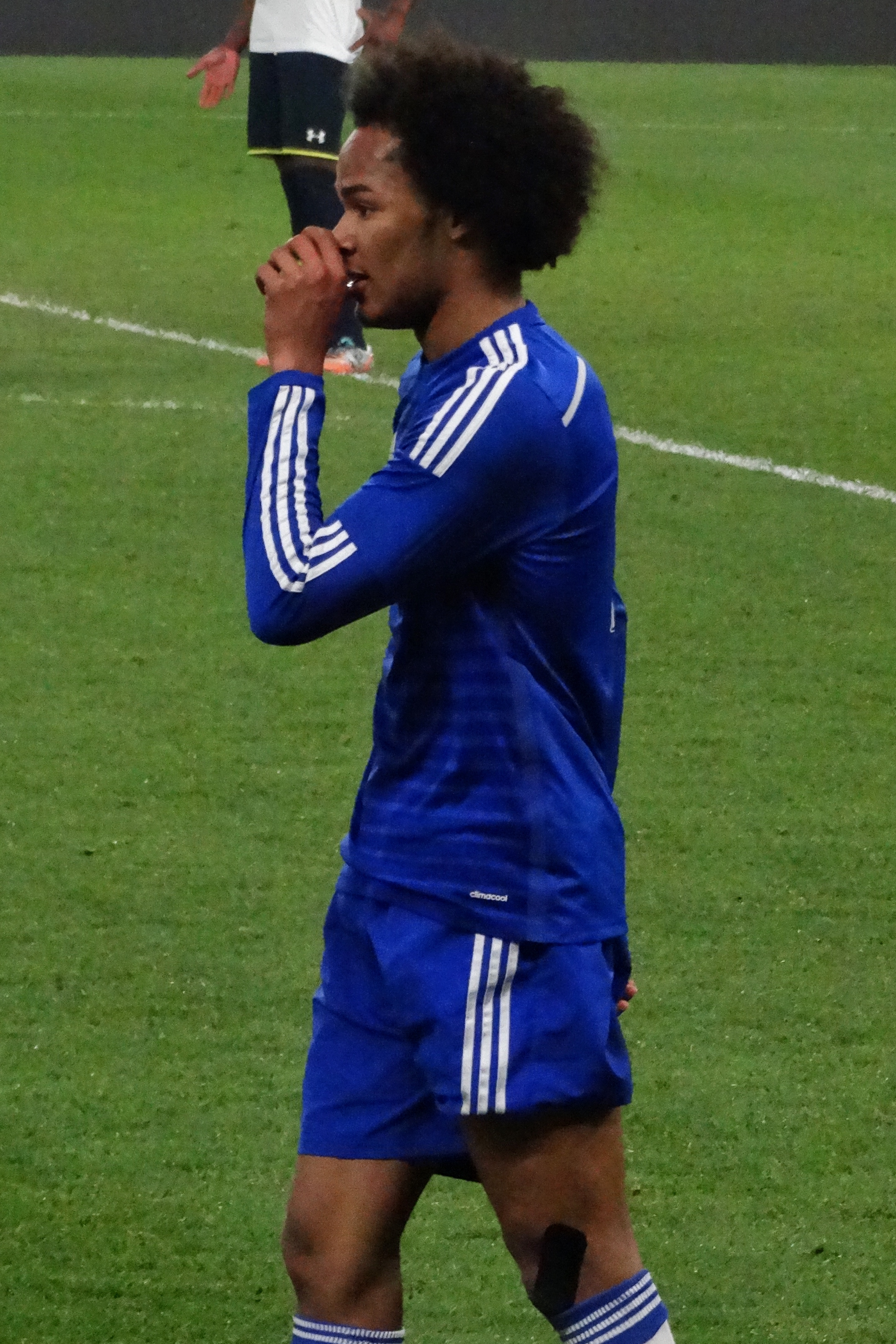
Brown playing for Chelsea under-18s in 2015

Brown scored his first goals for the Chelsea first team on 16 July 2014 in a 5–0 pre-season friendly victory over Wycombe Wanderers.

On 28 October, Brown made the Chelsea bench for the first time in a competitive fixture, but was an unused substitute as Chelsea beat Shrewsbury Town 2–1 to advance into quarter-finals of the League Cup.

On 31 January 2015, Brown made the Chelsea bench against current league title holders, Manchester City, but was again an unused substitute as Chelsea drew 1–1. Three days after the match, on 3 February, Brown was promoted into Mourinho's first team squad alongside fellow teenager Ruben Loftus-Cheek.

On 12 April, Brown was named on the first team bench for the third time that season for a West London derby against Queens Park Rangers. Less than 24 hours later he captained Chelsea U19 in the final of the 2014–15 UEFA Youth League against Shakhtar Donetsk in Switzerland and put in a man of the match performance scoring twice to help Chelsea take the title.

On 18 May, Brown made his Chelsea debut, coming off the bench for Loïc Rémy for the final eleven minutes of a 3–0 defeat at his former club West Bromwich Albion. Although Brown only made one league appearance out of the whole season, José Mourinho stated that he would receive a winner's medal for his contributions this season.

==== Vitesse (loan) ====
On 10 July 2015, Chelsea agreed to a deal that will see Brown go on loan to Dutch side Vitesse along with new signing Nathan. A week later, Brown made his debut and played for the entire first half in a friendly 1–0 win against the Turkish side Çaykur Rizespor. He made his competitive debut 13 days later in a UEFA Europa League third qualifying round first leg against Southampton at St. Mary's, playing the full 90 minutes of a 3–0 defeat.

On 6 March 2016, Brown scored his first senior goal, giving Vitesse the lead in the 34th minute in their 2–1 victory over Roda JC Kerkrade.

==== Rotherham United (loan) ====
On 15 August 2016, Brown joined Championship side Rotherham United on loan until the end of the 2016–17 season. On 20 August 2016, Brown made his debut in a 1–0 victory over Brentford. On 10 September 2016, Brown scored his first goal after the opening six minutes of a 2–2 draw against Bristol City. On 10 December 2016, Brown went onto score the winner in a 1–0 home victory against Queens Park Rangers.

The loan was terminated early by Chelsea on 6 January 2017.

==== Huddersfield Town (loan) ====
It was announced later that day that Brown had joined fellow Championship side Huddersfield Town on loan for the remainder of the season. On 7 January 2017, Brown made his Huddersfield debut in an FA Cup tie against Port Vale, which resulted in a 4–0 victory for the Championship side. Two weeks later, Brown scored his first goal for Huddersfield in a 2–0 victory against Ipswich Town, netting in the 41st minute. On 5 February 2017, Brown scored for Huddersfield with his first touch after coming on as a first half substitute in Huddersfield's 2–1 win in a West Yorkshire derby against rivals Leeds United.

Brown featured in Huddersfield's Championship play-off final victory against Reading on 29 May 2017, playing 98 minutes before being substituted for fellow Chelsea loanee Kasey Palmer.

Brown scored five Championship goals for Huddersfield throughout his loan spell at the club, and was linked with a permanent move in the summer following their promotion to the Premier League, however such a move failed to materialise.

==== Brighton & Hove Albion (loan) ====
On 25 July 2017, Brown joined newly promoted Premier League club Brighton & Hove Albion on a season-long loan. He made his debut for Brighton on 12 August, in their 2–0 defeat to Manchester City on the opening day of the season. Brown suffered an injury early in the match, and was substituted for Jamie Murphy.

Brown made his return from injury on 1 October, starting as a striker for Brighton in a 2–0 away defeat to Arsenal.

On 8 January 2018, in Brighton's 2–1 FA Cup victory over Crystal Palace, Brown suffered an anterior cruciate ligament injury and missed the rest of the season. Brown made 15 appearances in all competitions for Brighton throughout his loan spell, many coming as a substitute.

==== Leeds United (loan) ====
On 30 August 2018, Brown joined EFL Championship side Leeds United on a season long loan. After joining the club, whilst still carrying out his rehabilitation recovering from his existing cruciate ligament injury, on 16 November 2018, Brown made his first appearance in a Leeds shirt in a 3–0 defeat for Leeds' under-23s against Birmingham City under-23s side. However, he picked up a hamstring injury in his recovery which ruled him out of contention. In February 2019, Rob Price Leeds' Head of Medicine revealed that Brown was now 'fully fit'.

Brown was named in a first team squad for the first time in over a year after recovering from injury, when he was named on the bench as an unused substitute in Leeds' 1–1 draw against Middlesbrough on 9 February 2019.

On 26 February 2019, Brown made his debut with Leeds as a late substitute in a 1–0 defeat against Queens Park Rangers.

During the 2018–19 Leeds United F.C. season, Brown only played 2 games in all competitions for Leeds, with him recovering from injury and mainly playing matches with Leeds under-23s, after Leeds finished the regular season in third place after dropping out of the automatic promotion places with 3 games left after a defeat to 10 man Wigan Athletic on 19 April, Leeds qualified for the playoffs versus sixth-placed Derby County, Brown was named as an unused substitute as Leeds won the 1st leg of the playoffs in a 1–0 win at Pride Park, to bring into a 1–0 aggregate lead into the home leg at Elland Road, Brown made only his second appearance of the season as he came on as a second-half substitute for Patrick Bamford as Leeds lost 2–4 in the 2nd leg in an encounter with Leeds down to 10 men after the red card of Gaetano Berardi, the loss saw Derby progress 4–3 on aggregate to the final against Aston Villa.

==== Luton Town (loan) ====
On 8 August 2019, Brown joined another Championship side Luton Town until the end of 2019–20 season. He made his debut as a substitute on 17 August 2019, in a 2–1 loss to West Brom.

Brown scored his first goal for the club on 27 November 2019 as Luton beat Charlton Athletic 2–1 at home. He scored the decisive goal in the 53rd minute after Luton had originally fell behind in the 7th minute, before Pelly-Ruddock Mpanzu levelled proceedings a short while later.

On 30 November 2019, he suffered a hamstring injury during the 7–0 defeat at Brentford which forced him to out from the pitch for 10 weeks. He came back from injury as a substitute on 28 January 2020, in a narrow 3–2 win against Derby County.

On 4 July 2020, Brown played his last game for Luton as they suffered a heavy 5–0 home defeat to Reading. During his loan spell at Luton, he made 28 appearances in all competitions with a goal and provided 8 assists.

==== Sheffield Wednesday (loan) ====
On 20 August 2020, Brown signed a season long loan at Sheffield Wednesday. He made his club debut on 5 September as he scored a winning penalty kick against Walsall in a 4–2 shoot-out win in the first round of the EFL Cup.

==== Preston North End ====
On 22 June 2021, Brown signed for Championship club Preston North End on a one-year deal, with an option of an extra year. On 20 July 2021, it was announced that Brown suffered a ruptured Achilles during pre-season training, which was expected to keep him sidelined for "a significant period of time". Brown was released by Preston a week before the season ended, with the club claiming that Brown was not at the required standard: he didn't make a single appearance for Preston.

==== Retirement ====
On 6 April 2023, Brown announced his retirement from professional football, due to his recurrent injury problems.

== International career ==
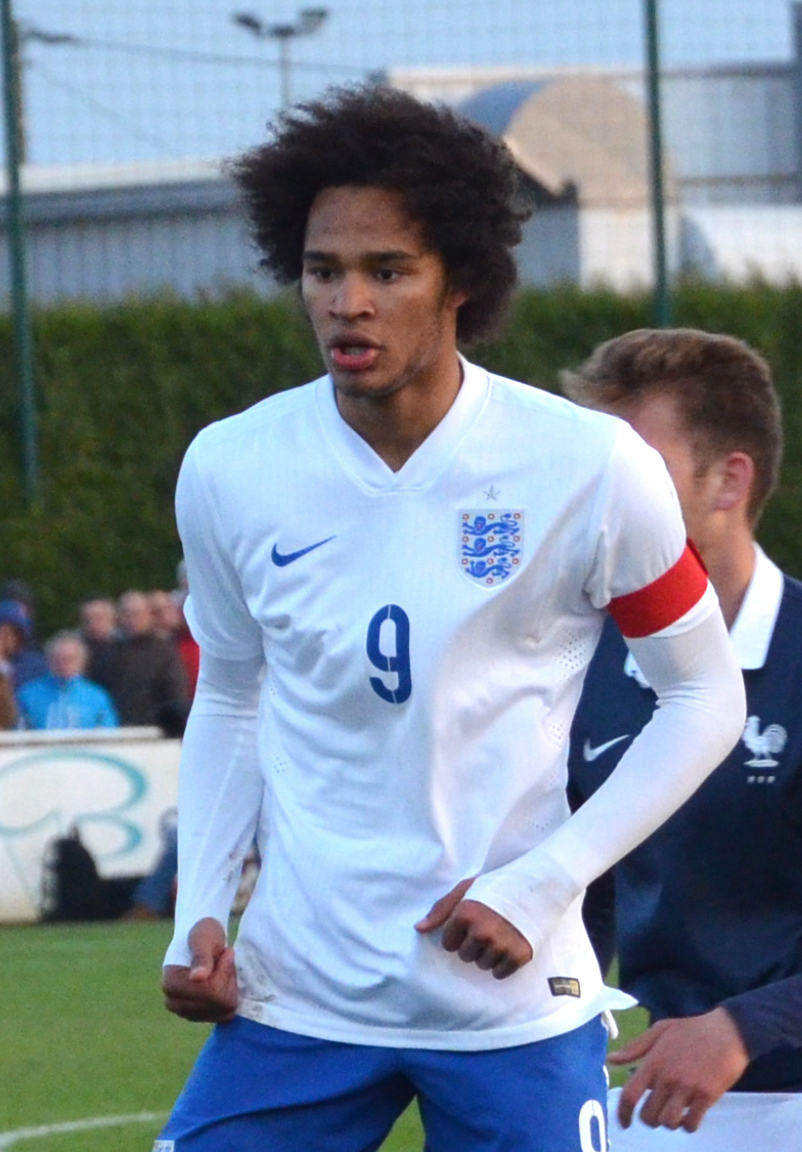
Brown playing for England U19s in 2015

Born in England, Brown is of Jamaican descent. He has represented England at under-16, under-17, under-19 and under-20 levels.

In March 2017, he was called up to the England U21 squad for the first time when he was at Huddersfield Town. He was also named into the preliminary squad in the training camp ahead of the 2017 UEFA European Under-21 Championship in June 2017.

== Style of play ==
Brown played as an attacking midfielder, forward or as a winger. He says his favoured position is as a number 10.

== Career statistics ==
Appearances and goals by club, season and competition
Club	Season	League			National Cup (Note: Includes FA Cup, KNVB Cup)		League Cup (Note: Includes EFL Cup)		Other		Total	
Club	Season	Division	Apps	Goals	Apps	Goals	Apps	Goals	Apps	Goals	Apps	Goals
West Bromwich Albion	2012–13	Premier League	1	0	0	0	0	0	—		1	0
Chelsea	2013–14	Premier League	0	0	0	0	0	0	0	0	0	0
Chelsea	2014–15	Premier League	1	0	0	0	0	0	0	0	1	0
Chelsea	2015–16	Premier League	0	0	0	0	0	0	0	0	0	0
Chelsea	2016–17	Premier League	0	0	0	0	0	0	0	0	0	0
Chelsea	2017–18	Premier League	0	0	0	0	0	0	0	0	0	0
Chelsea	2018–19	Premier League	0	0	0	0	0	0	0	0	0	0
Chelsea	2019–20	Premier League	0	0	0	0	0	0	0	0	0	0
Chelsea	2020–21	Premier League	0	0	0	0	0	0	0	0	0	0
Chelsea	Total		1	0	0	0	0	0	0	0	1	0
Vitesse (loan)	2015–16	Eredivisie	22	1	0	0	—		2 (Note: Appearances in UEFA Europa League)	0	24	1
Rotherham United (loan)	2016–17	Championship	20	3	0	0	0	0	—		20	3
Huddersfield Town (loan)	2016–17	Championship	15	4	3	1	—		3 (Note: Appearances in Championship play-offs)	0	21	5
Brighton & Hove Albion (loan)	2017–18	Premier League	13	0	1	0	0	0	1 (Note: Appearance in EFL Trophy for the Under-21s team)	0	15	0
Leeds United (loan)	2018–19	Championship	1	0	0	0	0	0	1	0	2	0
Luton Town (loan)	2019–20	Championship	25	1	0	0	3	0	—		28	1
Sheffield Wednesday (loan)	2020–21	Championship	19	0	1	0	1	0	—		21	0
Preston North End	2021–22	Championship	0	0	0	0	0	0	—		0	0
Career total			117	9	5	1	4	0	5	0	133	10

== Honours ==
Chelsea

- FA Youth Cup: 2013–14, 2014–15
- Professional U21 Development League: 2013–14
- UEFA Youth League: 2014–15

Huddersfield Town

- EFL Championship play-offs: 2017

England U16

- Victory Shield: 2011–12

England U17

- UEFA European Under-17 Championship: 2014

Individual

- West Bromwich Albion Academy Player of the Year: 2012–13
