= Danny Ward (Welsh footballer) =

Welsh footballer (born 1993)

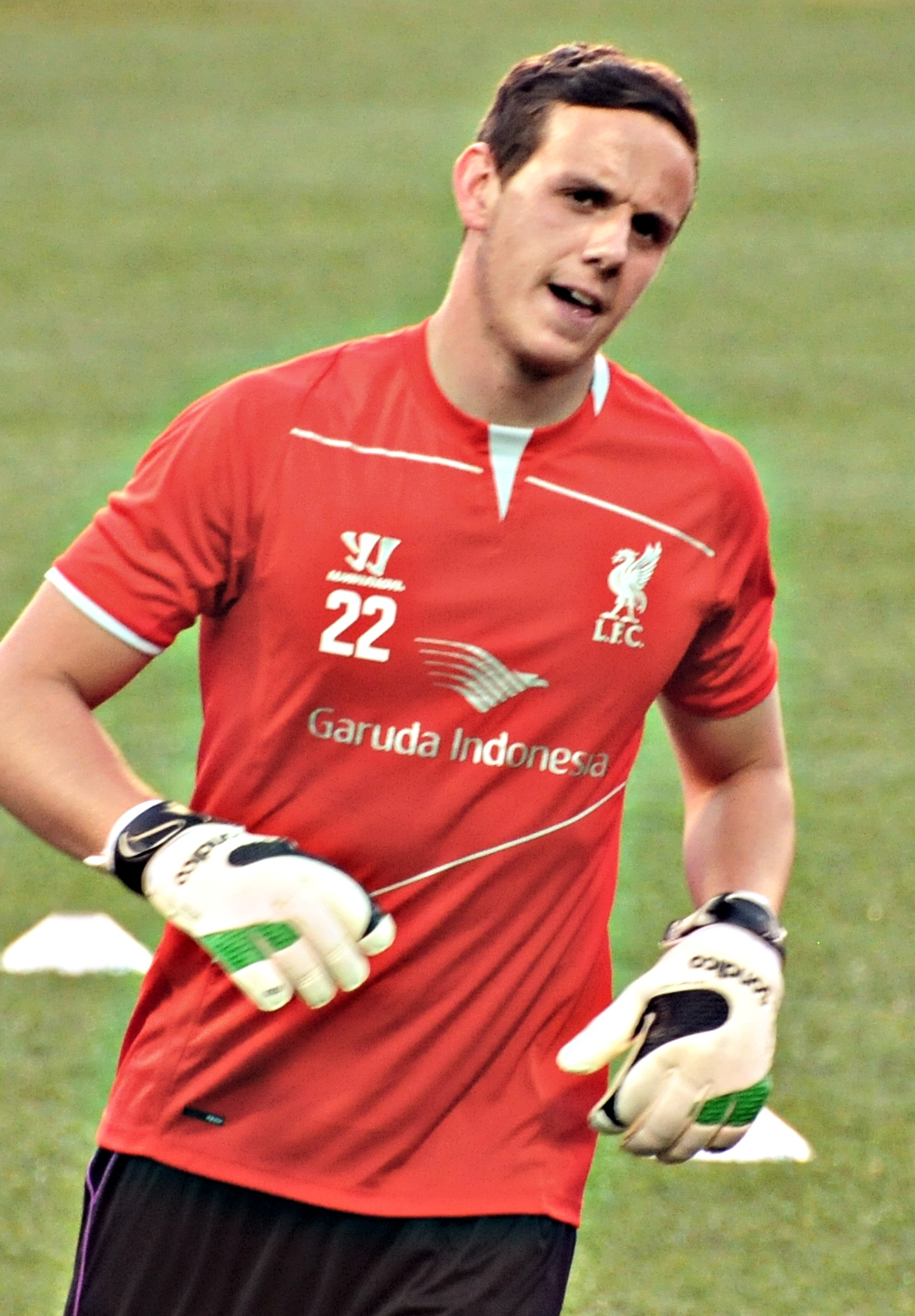
- Ward warming up for Liverpool in 2014

Personal information
- Full name: Daniel Ward
- Date of birth: 22 June 1993 (age 33)
- Place of birth: Wrexham, Wales
- Height: 6 ft 3 in (1.91 m)
- Position: Goalkeeper

Team information
- Current team: Wrexham
- Number: 21

Youth career
- 2007–2011: Wrexham

Senior career*
Years	Team	Apps	(Gls)
2011–2012	Wrexham	0	(0)
2011	→ Tamworth (loan)	1	(0)
2012–2018	Liverpool	2	(0)
2015	→ Morecambe (loan)	5	(0)
2015–2016	→ Aberdeen (loan)	21	(0)
2016–2017	→ Huddersfield Town (loan)	43	(0)
2018–2025	Leicester City	29	(0)
2025–	Wrexham	8	(0)

International career^{‡}
2010–2011	Wales U19	5	(0)
2013–2014	Wales U21	6	(0)
2016–	Wales	50	(0)
Medal record
Men's football
Representing Wales
UEFA European Championship
Bronze medal – third place	2016 France
- * Club domestic league appearances and goals as of 17:10, 18 May 2026 (UTC) ‡ National team caps and goals as of 22:07, 17 November 2026 (UTC)

Daniel Ward (born 22 June 1993) is a Welsh professional footballer who plays as a goalkeeper for EFL Championship club Wrexham and the Wales national team.

Ward has previously played for Liverpool and Leicester City, as well as having loan spells at Tamworth, Morecambe, Aberdeen and Huddersfield Town. He was first called up to the Welsh national team in 2013 and made his debut in 2016. He was part of their squad that reached the semi-finals of UEFA Euro 2016, and the last 16 of Euro 2020.

== Club career ==
=== Wrexham ===
Ward was born in Wrexham. He is a product of the Wrexham Academy, signing for them as a 14-year-old in 2007. In the 2010–11 season, Ward was briefly loaned out to fellow Conference Premier team Tamworth, making just one appearance in a league match on 12 March 2011 in a 3–2 loss against Hayes & Yeading United. He returned to Wrexham for the 2011–12 season and was promoted to the first team squad but only made it as far as the bench on a handful of occasions.

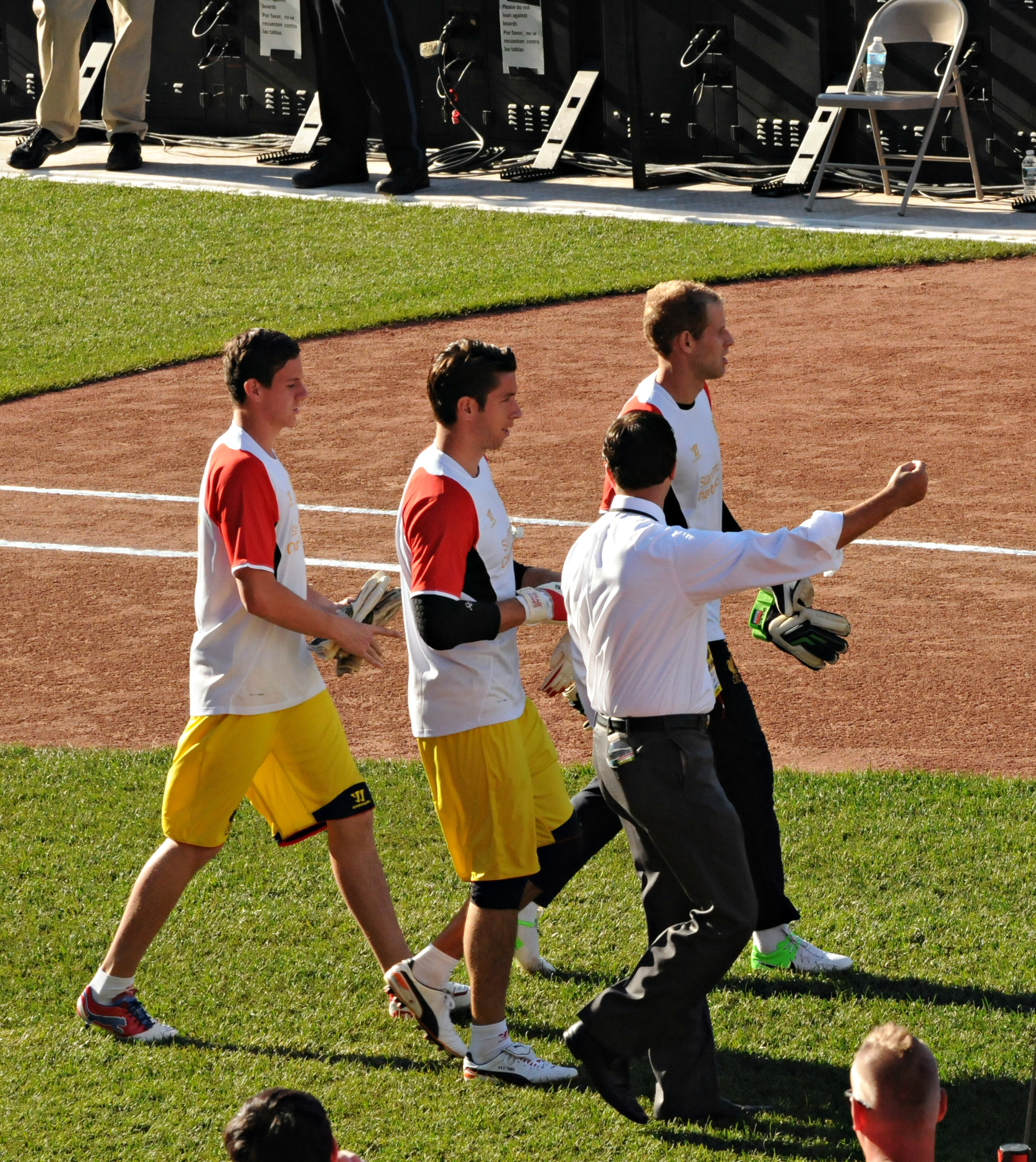
Ward with Brad Jones and Péter Gulácsi in 2012

=== Liverpool ===
On 30 January 2012, it was announced that Liverpool had signed Ward for a fee of around £100,000. He was quickly promoted to the reserve team and featured in the 2011–12 NextGen Series where he played in the semi-finals.

Ward got his first call-up to the Liverpool senior squad in a League Cup game against Swansea City on 31 October 2012 as an unused substitute. His next senior call up wasn't until 12 January 2014 for a Premier League game against Stoke City where Ward was deputising for the injured Brad Jones.

In March 2015, he was loaned to League Two side, Morecambe for one month. On 21 March 2015, he made his Football League debut in an away game against Carlisle United.

On 23 June 2015, Ward signed a new five-year contract at Liverpool, keeping him at the club until 2020. A few days later, he was loaned to Scottish Premiership club Aberdeen. He made his debut for Aberdeen on 2 July 2015, against FK Shkëndija in the first qualifying round of the UEFA Europa League. After the game, Aberdeen informed UEFA officials that Ward had been targeted by laser beams.

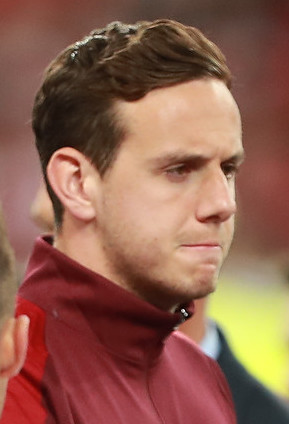
Ward after the 2018 UEFA Champions League final

On 10 January 2016, Liverpool cut short Ward's loan at Aberdeen and he returned after impressing with 13 clean sheets in all competitions for the Dons, making him a firm fan favourite. On 17 April 2016, Ward made his debut for Liverpool against Bournemouth in place of Simon Mignolet, where Liverpool won 2–1.

On 11 July 2016, he signed a season-long loan with Championship side Huddersfield Town. He made his competitive debut for the Terriers in their 2–1 win over Brentford on 6 August 2016. Ward played in the play-offs for promotion, saving a total of three penalties, including the crucial fifth penalty in the final against Reading, to help Huddersfield to promotion to the Premier League.

=== Leicester City ===
On 20 July 2018, as the arrival of Alisson Becker relegated him to fourth choice at Liverpool, Ward completed a move to fellow Premier League side Leicester City for around £12.5 million on a four-year contract. He made his debut on 28 August in the second round of the EFL Cup, keeping a clean sheet in a 4–0 win over Fleetwood Town. A month later in the next round, he saved three penalties in a shootout win at Wolverhampton Wanderers after keeping a clean sheet in a goalless draw, and was praised by teammate Marc Albrighton. Ward played only 14 times in his first three seasons at Leicester, and not at all in the league.

On 15 May 2022, Ward made his first Premier League appearance for Leicester—and his first overall since 2016—as the Foxes beat Watford 5–1 at Vicarage Road. Leicester manager Brendan Rodgers said that this was because he had chosen for Kasper Schmeichel to play three of the final five games in goal, and the other two for Ward.

Ward became Leicester's first-choice keeper for the 2022–23 season after Schmeichel's departure to Nice. He was dropped in favour of teammate Daniel Iversen in March 2023 after his form was called into question.

Ward's first Premier League appearance in the 2024–25 season came against Newcastle as a half-time substitute when first-choice keeper Mads Hermansen picked up an injury. The game finished in a 4–0 loss. Ward started the next game, again owing to Hermansen's injury, a 3–0 loss to Wolves. He was subsequently dropped by the manager Ruud Van Nistelrooy in favour of teammate Jakub Stolarczyk. He became the third-choice keeper in the club and acted in a supporting role. As a result, he was not included in the squad for any match for the rest of the season. He left the club at the end of the season following the end of his contract.

=== Return to Wrexham ===
On 1 July 2025, Ward returned to hometown club Wrexham on a two-year deal following their promotion to the EFL Championship. On 9 August, he conceded two injury-time goals in a 2–1 opening loss away to Southampton. Following an elbow injury, he was excluded from the club's league squad for the season on 4 September, which had to include at most 25 players aged over 21. In late November, he and fellow excluded players Jay Rodriguez and Andy Cannon returned to training, in anticipation of being registered for the squad in February.

== International career ==
Ward has represented Wales at under-17, under-19 and under-21 level. He was called up to the senior team for the first time for a friendly match against Finland, and was an unused substitute in the 1–1 draw on 16 November 2013 at the Cardiff City Stadium.

He made his senior debut as a half-time substitute for Wayne Hennessey in an international friendly against Northern Ireland on 24 March 2016, conceding from Craig Cathcart in a 1–1 draw at the same ground. Ward was selected in Wales' 23-man squad for UEFA Euro 2016 and was handed his first start for his country in his third cap in their opening game of the tournament, a 2–1 victory over Slovakia, after Hennessey suffered a back spasm prior to the match.

Ward missed Wales' participation in the 2018 China Cup when his passport got lost in the post during his visa application, and Michael Crowe was called up in his place.

In May 2021 he was selected for the Wales squad for the delayed UEFA Euro 2020 tournament. Having held down the starting place since Hennessey's thigh strain in November 2020, Ward played all of Wales's matches at the tournament, being knocked out in the last 16 by his Leicester teammate Kasper Schmeichel's Denmark.

In November 2022 he was named in the Wales squad for the 2022 FIFA World Cup in Qatar. He made his World Cup debut on 25 November 2022 against Iran when Hennessey was sent off in the 86th minute, with the game finishing 2–0 to Iran due to two late goals in stoppage time.

== Career statistics ==
=== Club ===
As of match played 11 August 2026

Appearances and goals by club, season and competition
Club	Season	League			National cup		League cup		Europe		Other		Total	
Club	Season	Division	Apps	Goals	Apps	Goals	Apps	Goals	Apps	Goals	Apps	Goals	Apps	Goals
Wrexham	2010–11	Conference Premier	0	0	0	0	—		—		—		0	0
Wrexham	2011–12	Conference Premier	0	0	1 (Note: Appearances in Welsh Cup)	0	—		—		—		0	0
Wrexham	Total		0	0	0	0	—		—		—		0	0
Tamworth (loan)	2010–11	Conference Premier	1	0	—		—		—		—		1	0
Liverpool	2014–15	Premier League	0	0	0	0	0	0	0	0	—		0	0
Liverpool	2015–16	Premier League	2	0	0	0	0	0	0	0	—		2	0
Liverpool	2017–18	Premier League	0	0	0	0	1	0	0	0	—		1	0
Liverpool	Total		2	0	0	0	1	0	0	0	—		3	0
Morecambe (loan)	2014–15	League Two	5	0	—		—		—		—		5	0
Aberdeen (loan)	2015–16	Scottish Premiership	21	0	1	0	1	0	6 (Note: Appearances in UEFA Europa League)	0	—		29	0
Huddersfield Town (loan)	2016–17	Championship	43	0	0	0	1	0	—		2 (Note: Appearances in Championship play-offs)	0	46	0
Leicester City	2018–19	Premier League	0	0	1	0	4	0	—		—		5	0
Leicester City	2019–20	Premier League	0	0	2	0	2	0	—		—		4	0
Leicester City	2020–21	Premier League	0	0	2	0	1	0	2	0	—		5	0
Leicester City	2021–22	Premier League	1	0	2	0	2	0	0	0	0	0	5	0
Leicester City	2022–23	Premier League	26	0	0	0	2	0	—		—		28	0
Leicester City	2023–24	Championship	0	0	0	0	0	0	—		—		0	0
Leicester City	2024–25	Premier League	2	0	0	0	3	0	—		—		5	0
Leicester City	Total		29	0	7	0	14	0	2	0	0	0	52	0
Wrexham	2025–26	Championship	8	0	0	0	0	0	—		—		8	0
Wrexham	2026–27	Championship	0	0	0	0	1	0	—		—		1	0
Wrexham	Total		8	0	0	0	1	0	—		—		9	0
Career total			109	0	8	0	18	0	8	0	2	0	145	0

=== International ===
As of match played 17 November 2026

Appearances and goals by national team and year
National team	Year	Apps	Goals
Wales	2016	3	0
Wales	2017	1	0
Wales	2018	1	0
Wales	2019	2	0
Wales	2020	3	0
Wales	2021	14	0
Wales	2022	4	0
Wales	2023	10	0
Wales	2024	6	0
Wales	2025	0	0
Wales	2026	6	0
Total		50	0

== Honours ==
Liverpool

- UEFA Europa League runner-up: 2015–16

Huddersfield Town

- EFL Championship play-offs: 2017

Leicester City

- FA Cup: 2020–21
- FA Community Shield: 2021
- EFL Championship: 2023–24
