= Martin Cranie =

English footballer (born 1986)

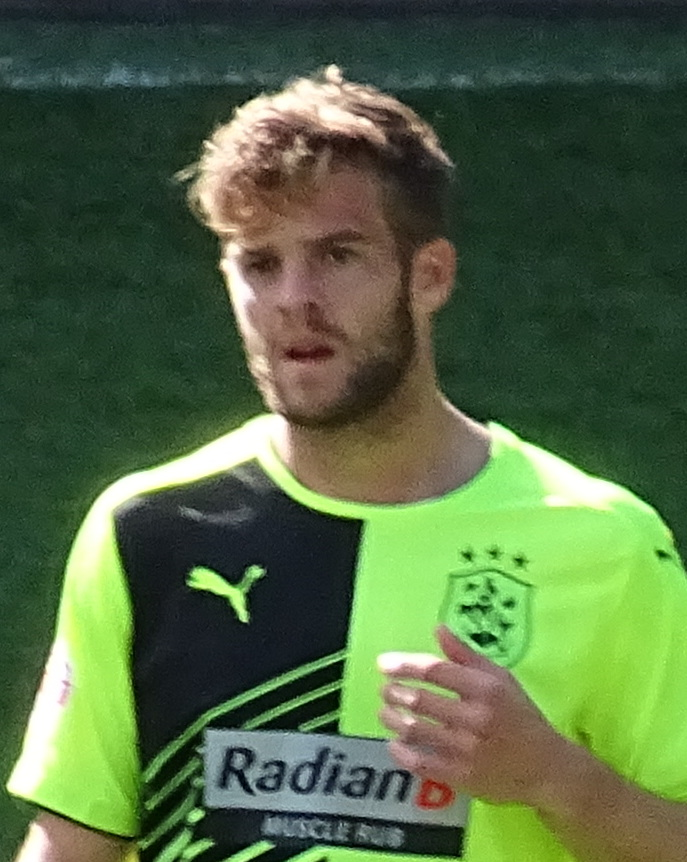
- Cranie playing for Huddersfield Town in 2015

Personal information
- Full name: Martin James Cranie
- Date of birth: 26 September 1986 (age 40)
- Place of birth: Yeovil, Somerset, England
- Height: 6 ft 0 in (1.83 m)
- Position: Centre back

Youth career
- 2003–2004: Southampton

Senior career*
Years	Team	Apps	(Gls)
2004–2007	Southampton	16	(0)
2004	→ AFC Bournemouth (loan)	3	(0)
2006–2007	→ Yeovil Town (loan)	8	(0)
2007	→ Yeovil Town (loan)	4	(0)
2007–2009	Portsmouth	2	(0)
2007	→ Queens Park Rangers (loan)	6	(0)
2008–2009	→ Charlton Athletic (loan)	19	(0)
2009–2012	Coventry City	114	(1)
2012–2015	Barnsley	110	(1)
2015–2018	Huddersfield Town	54	(0)
2018	Middlesbrough	9	(0)
2018–2019	Sheffield United	15	(0)
2019–2021	Luton Town	47	(2)
Total		409	(5)

International career
2003	England U17	7	(0)
2004	England U18	2	(0)
2004–2005	England U19	12	(0)
2003–2005	England U20	2	(0)
2007–2009	England U21	16	(1)
- * Club domestic league appearances and goals

Martin James Cranie (born 26 September 1986) is an English former professional footballer. He last played as a centre back and right back for Championship club Luton Town. He is a former England U21 international. He began his career with the Southampton youth academy before moving to local rivals Portsmouth and later to Coventry City after several loan spells, then followed by three years at Barnsley.

== Early life ==
Born at Yeovil, Somerset, Cranie attended the local Buckler's Mead Community School between 1998 and 2003 after completing his primary school education at Birchfield Community School.

== Club career ==
=== Southampton ===
Following an injury crisis at the club, manager Paul Sturrock was forced to use Cranie in the first-team against Chelsea in May 2004. However, his debut was marred when he inadvertently scored an own-goal, in a 4–0 defeat. After the match, Cranie's teammate Danny Higginbotham said: "He's a very good player with a bright future who certainly didn't look out of place at all." Cranie, one of the youngest post-war players to make their debut for the club, described it as a "good experience". "I was asked to play left wing-back, which I had never played before, but being out on the pitch with some of those players was unbelievable."

In October 2004, Cranie spent time on loan to AFC Bournemouth. He made three appearances for the club, and although they were keen to extend his loan spell, their request was rejected. After his loan spell with Bournemouth ended, Cranie made his first appearance of the season, in a 0–0 draw against Charlton Athletic on 26 December 2004. He later made two more appearances in the 2004–05 season, as Southampton were relegated from the Premier League. He was a member of Southampton's youth team that reached the final of the FA Youth Cup in 2005, losing on aggregate to Ipswich Town.

The 2005–06 season saw Cranie make eleven appearances and then, on 7 November 2006, he joined League One side Yeovil Town on loan until January. After spending two months back with Southampton, on 2 March 2007, he returned to Yeovil on loan until Easter. Cranie stayed with the club for several weeks before returning to his parent club on 30 March 2007. He made his first and only 2006–07 appearance for the Saints in the second leg of the play-off semi-final against Derby County where he acquitted himself well although his side was defeated on penalties.

With lack of first team opportunities, Cranie hinted at leaving the club when his contract expired at the end of the 2006–07 season, though he said that he was "keeping his options open". "I would like to break into the first team but if not I will have to look elsewhere to get my football." At the end of the 2006–07 season, Cranie was offered a one-year contract to stay at the club, but rejected the offer. Then manager George Burley, begrudgingly accepted, and understood, Cranie's decision to leave the club.

=== Portsmouth ===
Cranie signed with Portsmouth on 26 June 2007, rejoining his former manager Harry Redknapp.

He made his Portsmouth debut in the first home game of the 2007–08 season against Manchester United on 15 August 2007, with a solid performance at right back. On 6 October, after three appearances for Portsmouth, Cranie agreed to join Queens Park Rangers on a three-month loan. QPR, bottom of the Championship, were interested in Cranie when he was with the Saints. He made his Queens Park Rangers debut on 8 October 2007, in a 1–0 win over Norwich City. However, his loan ended when he suffered a broken leg after just six appearances for the London side.

In September 2008, Cranie joined Championship side Charlton Athletic on loan until the end of the year. He made his Charlton Athletic debut on 13 September 2008, in a 3–1 loss against Wolves. After making nineteen appearances, Cranie returned to Portsmouth in January 2009 and appeared in two FA Cup matches.

On 12 August 2009, Portsmouth agreed to sell Cranie to Coventry City for £500,000.

=== Coventry City ===
On 13 August 2009, Cranie transferred to Coventry City, signing a three-year contract with the Championship club. It was disclosed that the transfer fee was £500,000.

Two days after signing with the club, Cranie made his Coventry City debut, coming off in the 72nd minute, in a 2–0 win over Barnsley. Thirty days later, Cranie scored his first career goal in Coventry's 3–2 home win against Sheffield United on 15 September 2009. The goal was a flicked header at the near post from a corner and turned out to be the match winner as it gave Coventry a 3–1 lead. In mid-November Cranie found himself in an unfamiliar role as a right-back and on the bench, slipping down to the pecking order following the arrival of Leon Barnett and Richard Wood. Cranie then provided an assist for Jon Stead, which turned out to be the only goal in a 1–0 win over Peterborough United on 6 March 2010. Ahead of a match against Middlesbrough on 24 April 2010, Cranie suffered a knee injury in training, but eventually recovered and was in the squad, which played to a 1–1 draw. Cranie later regained his first team place making forty league appearances for the club in his first season.

Before the start of the 2010–11 Norwich City was said to want to sign Cranie. This was denied by Manager Aidy Boothroyd. Despite this, Cranie continued to be in the first team at the club and stayed at the club when the summer transfer closed. After being sidelined for one game with an ankle injury, Cranie returned to the first team until he was placed on the substitution bench for the rest of 2010. Cranie regained his first team place throughout the rest of the season until he was sent-off after a second bookable offence in a 1–1 draw against Leicester City on 26 February 2011. He sustained a hamstring strain during a match against Hull City. In his second season Cranie made thirty-six appearances for the club.

Prior to the 2011–12 season, Cranie was among four candidates for captain of Coventry City, a job eventually given to Richard Woods. As the 2011–12 season started, Cranie continued to be on the first team until he sustained a rib injury, and had to be substituted in the 49th minute, in a 2–0 defeat to Barnsley on 1 October 2011. Coventry sent Cranie for a second scan to determine the seriousness of his injury and following it the team announced that he would be out for a month with cracked ribs. Cranie returned to the first team on 19 November 2011, and played 90 minutes in a 2–1 loss to West Ham United. After being sidelined for two weeks, Cranie made his first team return on 30 December 2011, in a 2–0 win over Brighton & Hove Albion. Later in the 2011–12 season, Cranie went on to make thirty-eight appearances for the club, as they were relegated to League One for the next season.

With one-year left on his contract, Cranie stated that he was happy to wait until the end of the season to renegotiate it. Manager Andy Thorn called for the club to offer Cranie a new contract. Although initial contract talks were positive according to the club's development director Steve Waggott, Cranie turned down a new deal with Coventry City following the club's relegation, making him a free agent.

On 12 July 2012, Cranie joined Leeds United on a trial basis and started training with the team during the pre- season. On 20 July, Cranie played for Leeds United for the first half in a 5–2 win at Farsley in a pre-season friendly. Cranie also went on Leeds United's three game West Country Tour, playing in all three wins over Tavistock A.F.C., Bodmin Town and Torquay United. Following the tour Leeds manager Neil Warnock expressed an interest in offering Cranie a contract at Elland Road.

=== Barnsley ===
On 14 August 2012, Barnsley offered Cranie a contract and on 20 August 2012, the move was confirmed, with Cranie signing a one-year contract.

Seven days later, Cranie made his debut appearance with the Tykes as a substitute for Bobby Hassell in the 3–1 defeat at Wolves. Eleven days later on 1 September 2012, Cranie provided an assist for Jacob Mellis, who scored the only goal in a 1–0 win over Bristol City. Three weeks later on 22 September 2012, Cranie provided another assist for Craig Davies, in a 5–0 win over Birmingham City. However, Cranie suffered injuries during the season, one of which sidelined him throughout October, then was sidelined throughout December and sidelined for a third time due to hamstring strain in early-April. In his first season at Barnsley, Cranie made thirty-six appearances for the club. Cranie was awarded the club's Players' Player of the Year award in April 2013. With his contract expiring at the end of the 2012–13 season, Cranie agreed to sign a new 2-year contract with the club.

In the 2013–14 season, Cranie was featured in the first team in the opening game of the season, a 4–0 loss against Wigan Athletic. However, Cranie was soon sidelined with a knee injury and was out for some time. After making his recovery, Cranie made his first team return, as a substitute in the 46th minute, in a 3–2 loss against Nottingham Forest on 14 September 2013. With the absence of Stephen Dawson, Cranie took over his captaincy temporarily and captained his first match – a 2–1 loss to Leicester City. Cranie provided an assist for Jim O'Brien, which turned out to be the only goal, in a 1–0 win over Millwall on 22 February 2014. Between 28 September 2013, and 11 March 2014, Cranie captained the club for half of the season until he suffered a hamstring tear during a match against Leicester City, requiring several weeks recovery. Cranie returned to the first team on 15 April 2014 in a 2–1 win over Charlton Athletic. After this, Cranie was featured for the last five games, but was unable to help the club survive relegation from the SkyBet Championship. Cranie was awarded the club's Players' Player of the Year for the second time by his teammates.

Ahead of the 2014–15 season, it was reported that Barnsley were trying to sell Martin Cranie along with Chris O'Grady and Tom Kennedy, to reduce costs. The club's attempt was unsuccessful and Cranie was featured on the first team throughout the season, and remained the club's captain. He scored his first goal, in a 2–1 win over Crewe on 16 August 2014. A week later, in the first game of the season against Yeovil Town, he scored an own-goal to keep the game at a draw. In late-December, Cranie suffered a swollen knee that kept him out for a month. He returned from this injury in a 2–1 win over Port Vale on 31 January 2015. His return was short-lived when he suffered a hip injury and was replaced at half-time during a match against Fleetwood Town on 7 February 2015. Cranie recovered from his injury and went on to make thirty-eight appearances for the club during the 2014–15 season.

At the end of the 2014–15 season, Cranie was among three players to be released by the club. Although Manager Lee Johnson would have preferred to keep him on the team his salary was unaffordable for a League One club.

=== Huddersfield Town ===
On 22 July 2015, Cranie signed with Huddersfield Town on a one-year contract, following a successful trial with the club. He made his début for the Terriers in the 2–0 defeat against Hull City at the KC Stadium on 8 August 2015.

=== Middlesbrough ===
On 31 January 2018, Cranie signed for Championship side Middlesbrough, for an undisclosed fee. He was brought in as a potential replacement for fellow full-back Cyrus Christie, who had left the club on the same day to join Fulham.

Cranie made his first appearance for the Boro on 10 February, coming on as a substitute for Stewart Downing in the final minutes of a 2–1 victory over Reading at the Riverside Stadium. The full-back made back-to-back continuous substitute appearances for the club, which resulted in the team climbing up the league table into the play-off positions.

Craine was released by Middlesbrough at the end of the 2017–18 season.

=== Sheffield United ===
On 1 September 2018, Cranie signed for Championship side Sheffield United on a short-term deal.

He was released by Sheffield United at the end of the 2018–19 season.

=== Luton Town ===
Cranie signed for newly promoted Championship club Luton Town on 28 June 2019 on a free transfer. He scored on his competitive debut for Luton Town in a thrilling 3–3 opening day draw against former club Middlesbrough.

His contract expired at the end of the 2020–21 season. Luton offered him a contract extension, but he turned it down and left the club.

== International career ==
Because his parents have different nationalities, Cranie played for the Scotland Under-17s and then decided to commit to England when he was chosen for its Under-17 squad. Cranie was called up to the U-20s for the 2003 FIFA World Youth Championship alongside James Milner, Andrew Taylor and Steven Taylor as the youngest players on the squad. He made only one appearance as England crashed out after finishing at the bottom of their group.

On 16 August 2007 Cranie was called up for the England Under-21 squad and made his debut against Romania. During the 2009 European Championship qualifying he mostly played at right back as Nedum Onuoha and captain Steven Taylor were preferred in central defence. He scored his first U-21 international goal in a 3–3 draw against Sweden in the semi-finals of the 2009 Under-21 European Championship, finishing off Milner's inswinging corner barely a minute after kick-off.

Cranie hoped his move to Coventry City would see him earn a call-up from the national senior team.

== Personal life ==
In October 2014, Cranie became a father when his partner gave birth to their first child.

== Career statistics ==
As of match played 5 April 2021

Appearances and goals by club, season and competition
Club	Season	League			FA Cup		League Cup		Other		Total	
Club	Season	Division	Apps	Goals	Apps	Goals	Apps	Goals	Apps	Goals	Apps	Goals
Southampton	2003–04	Premier League	1	0	0	0	0	0	—		1	0
Southampton	2004–05	Premier League	3	0	2	0	1	0	—		6	0
Southampton	2005–06	Championship	11	0	2	0	2	0	—		15	0
Southampton	2006–07	Championship	1	0	1	0	0	0	1 (Note: Appearance(s) in Championship play-offs)	0	3	0
Southampton	Total		16	0	5	0	3	0	1	0	25	0
AFC Bournemouth (loan)	2004–05	League One	3	0	—		—		0	0	3	0
Yeovil Town (loan)	2006–07	League One	12	0	—		0	0	0	0	12	0
Portsmouth	2007–08	Premier League	2	0	0	0	1	0	—		3	0
Portsmouth	2008–09	Premier League	0	0	2	0	0	0	—		2	0
Portsmouth	Total		2	0	2	0	1	0	—		5	0
Queens Park Rangers (loan)	2007–08	Championship	6	0	0	0	—		—		6	0
Charlton Athletic (loan)	2008–09	Championship	19	0	—		0	0	—		19	0
Coventry City	2009–10	Championship	40	1	2	0	0	0	—		42	1
Coventry City	2010–11	Championship	36	0	2	0	0	0	—		38	0
Coventry City	2011–12	Championship	38	0	1	0	1	0	—		40	0
Coventry City	Total		114	1	5	0	1	0	—		120	1
Barnsley	2012–13	Championship	36	0	4	0	1	0	—		41	0
Barnsley	2013–14	Championship	35	0	1	0	1	0	—		37	0
Barnsley	2014–15	League One	39	1	3	0	1	0	1 (Note: Appearance in Football League Trophy)	0	44	1
Barnsley	Total		110	1	8	0	3	0	1	0	122	1
Huddersfield Town	2015–16	Championship	37	0	1	0	1	0	—		39	0
Huddersfield Town	2016–17	Championship	14	0	4	0	1	0	2	0	21	0
Huddersfield Town	2017–18	Premier League	3	0	0	0	1	0	—		4	0
Huddersfield Town	Total		54	0	5	0	3	0	2	0	64	0
Middlesbrough	2017–18	Championship	9	0	0	0	—		—		9	0
Sheffield United	2018–19	Championship	15	0	1	0	0	0	—		16	0
Luton Town	2019–20	Championship	24	2	0	0	1	0	—		25	2
Luton Town	2020–21	Championship	23	0	0	0	2	0	—		25	0
Luton Town	Total		47	2	0	0	3	0	—		50	2
Career total			407	4	26	0	14	0	4	0	451	4

== Honours ==
Huddersfield Town

- EFL Championship play-offs: 2017

Sheffield United

- EFL Championship runner-up: 2018–19

England U21

- UEFA European Under-21 Championship runner-up: 2009
