= Chris Löwe =

German footballer (born 1989)

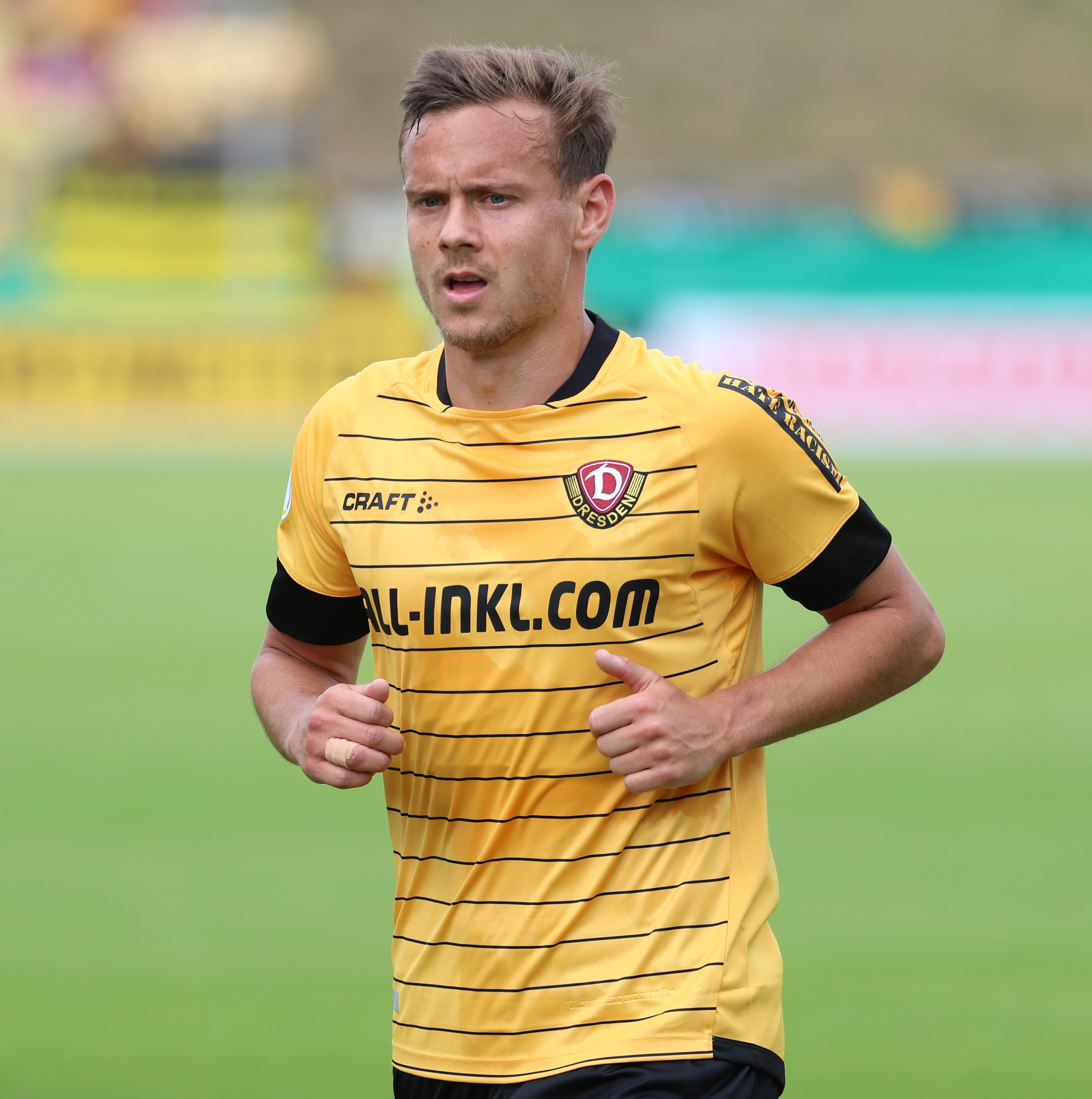
- Löwe with Dynamo Dresden in 2019

Personal information
- Full name: Chris Jörg Löwe
- Date of birth: 16 April 1989 (age 37)
- Place of birth: Plauen, East Germany
- Height: 1.71 m (5 ft 7 in)
- Position: Left-back

Youth career
- –2002: 1. FC Wacker Plauen
- 2002–2007: Chemnitzer FC

Senior career*
Years	Team	Apps	(Gls)
2007–2011	Chemnitzer FC	85	(9)
2011–2013	Borussia Dortmund	7	(0)
2011–2013	Borussia Dortmund II	6	(0)
2013–2016	1. FC Kaiserslautern	99	(4)
2016–2019	Huddersfield Town	93	(2)
2019–2022	Dynamo Dresden	61	(1)
2022–2023	Chemnitzer FC	24	(2)
Total		375	(18)
Medal record
Borussia Dortmund
Winner	Bundesliga	2012
Winner	DFB-Pokal	2012
- * Club domestic league appearances and goals

Chris Jörg Löwe (German: [ˈkʁɪs ˈløːvə]; born 16 April 1989) is a German former professional footballer who played at left-back.

== Career ==
=== Chemnitzer FC ===
Löwe began his career in the youth of 1. FC Wacker Plauen and Chemnitzer FC and was subsequently promoted to the first team in the 2007–08 season.

=== Borussia Dortmund ===
Löwe was sold to Borussia Dortmund for €200,000 and signed a four-year contract. Löwe earned his first competitive appearance for Dortmund in the 2011 DFL-Supercup against rivals Schalke 04 on 23 July 2011. In the club's league opener on 5 August 2011, Löwe started in the back four helping his side to a 3–1 victory over HSV.

=== 1. FC Kaiserslautern ===
In January 2013, Löwe was sold to 1. FC Kaiserslautern for a reported fee of €500,000 and signed a contract that will last to 2016.

In July 2015, he was appointed as the new club captain.

=== Huddersfield Town ===
On 6 April 2016, it was announced that Löwe had signed a pre-contract agreement with Huddersfield Town on a three-year deal, having been out of contract in the summer at 1. FC Kaiserslautern. He made his debut for the Terriers in their 2–1 win over Brentford on 6 August 2016. Löwe scored his first goal for Huddersfield scoring the opener in a 2–1 win over Barnsley on 20 August 2016. Löwe helped Huddersfield progress to the Championship Playoff Final in a penalty shoot out against Sheffield Wednesday in a 4–3 win as the tie ended 1–1 on aggregate on 17 May 2017. He then went on to score in the penalty shootout against Reading at Wembley Stadium which resulted in a 4–3 win after drawing 0–0 in 120 minutes, gaining Huddersfield promotion to the Premier League on 29 May 2017.

In July 2017, Löwe agreed a new three-year contract with Huddersfield, with the option for a further year.

=== Dynamo Dresden ===
On 24 May 2019, Löwe agreed a transfer to Dynamo Dresden for an undisclosed fee. In January 2022, he extended his contract with the club until summer 2023, though as the club were relegated back to the 3. Liga at the end of the season, his contract (which was not valid for the 3. Liga) expired anyway and he became a free agent.

=== Chemnitzer FC and retirement ===
In September 2022, he returned to Chemnitzer FC. In March 2024 Löwe announced his retirement from playing.

== Career statistics ==
Appearances and goals by club, season and competition
Club	Season	League			National cup		League cup		Other		Total	
Club	Season	Division	Apps	Goals	Apps	Goals	Apps	Goals	Apps	Goals	Apps	Goals
Chemnitzer FC	2008–09	Regionalliga Nord	17	1	0	0	—		—		17	1
Chemnitzer FC	2009–10	Regionalliga Nord	34	4	0	0	—		—		34	4
Chemnitzer FC	2010–11	Regionalliga Nord	34	4	2	0	—		—		36	4
Chemnitzer FC	Total		85	9	2	0	—		—		87	9
Borussia Dortmund II	2011–12	Regionalliga West	5	0	—		—		—		5	0
Borussia Dortmund II	2012–13	3. Liga	1	0	—		—		—		1	0
Borussia Dortmund II	Total		6	0	—		—		—		6	0
Borussia Dortmund	2011–12	Bundesliga	7	0	2	0	—		2	0	11	0
1. FC Kaiserslautern	2012–13	2. Bundesliga	14	0	0	0	—		2	0	16	0
1. FC Kaiserslautern	2013–14	2. Bundesliga	29	1	4	0	—		—		33	1
1. FC Kaiserslautern	2014–15	2. Bundesliga	33	2	1	0	—		—		34	2
1. FC Kaiserslautern	2015–16	2. Bundesliga	23	1	2	0	—		—		25	1
1. FC Kaiserslautern	Total		106	4	9	0	—		4	0	119	4
Huddersfield Town	2016–17	Championship	41	2	0	0	1	0	3 (Note: Appearances in Championship play-offs)	0	45	2
Huddersfield Town	2017–18	Premier League	23	0	2	0	0	0	0	0	25	0
Huddersfield Town	2018–19	Premier League	29	0	1	0	1	0	0	0	31	0
Huddersfield Town	Total		93	2	3	0	2	0	3	0	101	2
Dynamo Dresden	2019–20	2. Bundesliga	21	0	1	1	–		–		22	1
Dynamo Dresden	2020–21	3. Liga	12	0	1	0	–		–		13	0
Dynamo Dresden	2021–22	2. Bundesliga	28	1	2	0	–		2 (Note: Appearances in relegation play-offs)	0	32	1
Dynamo Dresden	Total		61	1	4	1	0	0	2	0	67	2
Chemnitzer FC	2022–23	Regionalliga Nordost	24	2	0	0	—		—		24	2
Career total			375	18	18	1	2	0	9	0	404	19

== Honours ==
Borussia Dortmund

- Bundesliga: 2011–12
- DFB-Pokal: 2011–12

Huddersfield Town

- EFL Championship play-offs: 2017
