= 2017 EFL play-offs =

EFL play-offs
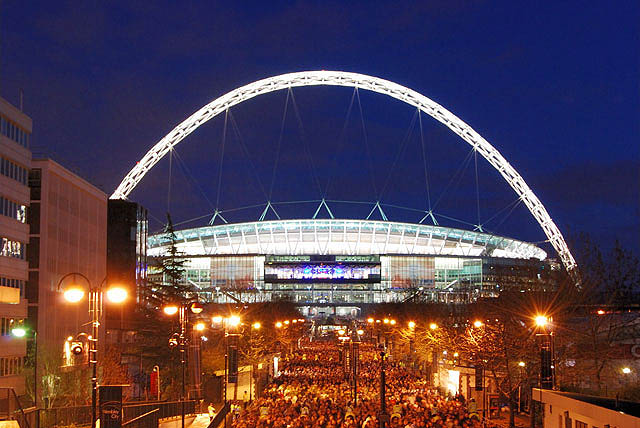
- Wembley Stadium is the venue for each play-off final
- Season: 2016–17
- Matches: 15
- Goals: 34 (2.27 per match)
- Biggest home win: Bradford 1–0 Fleetwood; Blackpool 3–2 Luton; Reading 1–0 Fulham; Exeter 3-2 Carlisle
- Biggest away win: Scunthorpe 2–3 Millwall
- Highest scoring: Carlisle 3–3 Exeter; Luton 3–3 Blackpool
- Highest attendance: 76,682
- Lowest attendance: 3,882
- Average attendance: 17,205

The English Football League play-offs for the 2016–17 season (referred to as the Sky Bet Play-Offs for sponsorship reasons) were held in May 2017 with all finals being staged at Wembley Stadium in London.

The play-offs begin in each league with two semi-finals which are played over two legs. The teams who finished in 3rd, 4th, 5th and 6th place in the Championship and League One and the 4th, 5th, 6th and 7th-placed teams in League Two compete. The winners of the semi-finals advance to the finals, with the winners gaining promotion for the following season.

== Background ==
The English Football League play-offs have been held every year since 1987. They take place for each division following the conclusion of the regular season and are contested by the four clubs finishing below the automatic promotion places. The fixtures are determined by final league position – in the Championship and League One this is 3rd v 6th and 4th v 5th, while in League Two it is 4th v 7th and 5th v 6th.

== Championship ==
=== Championship Semi-finals ===
Final league position - Championship
Pos	Team	Pld	W	D	L	GF	GA	GD	Pts
3	Reading	46	26	7	13	68	64	+4	85
4	Sheffield Wednesday	46	24	9	13	60	45	+15	81
5	Huddersfield Town	46	25	6	15	56	58	–2	81
6	Fulham	46	22	14	10	85	57	+28	80

First leg

13 May 2017
17:30 BST

Fulham	1–1	Reading
Cairney 65'	Report	Obita 53'

Craven Cottage, London (Fulham)
Attendance: 23,717
Referee: Stuart Attwell
14 May 2017
12:00 BST

Huddersfield Town	0–0	Sheffield Wednesday
	Report

John Smith's Stadium, Huddersfield
Attendance: 20,357
Referee: Paul Tierney

Second leg

16 May 2017
19:45 BST

Reading	1–0	Fulham
Kermorgant 49' (pen.)	Report

Madejski Stadium, Reading
Attendance: 22,044
Referee: Martin Atkinson

Reading won 2–1 on aggregate.

17 May 2017
19:45 BST

Sheffield Wednesday	1–1 (a.e.t.)	Huddersfield Town
Fletcher 51'	Report	Lees 73' (o.g.)
Penalties
Hutchinson (penalty missed); Bannan (penalty scored); Lee (penalty scored); Hunt (penalty scored); Forestieri (penalty missed)	3–4	(penalty scored) Löwe; (penalty scored) Hefele; (penalty scored) Wells; (penalty scored) Mooy; (penalty missed) Payne

Hillsborough, Sheffield
Attendance: 32,625
Referee: Andre Marriner

Sheffield Wednesday 1–1 Huddersfield Town on aggregate. Huddersfield Town won 4–3 on penalties.

=== Championship final ===
29 May 2017
15:00

Huddersfield Town	0–0 (a.e.t.)	Reading
	Report
Penalties
Löwe (penalty scored); Hefele (penalty missed); Wells (penalty scored); Mooy (penalty scored); Schindler (penalty scored)	4–3	Kermorgant (penalty scored); Williams (penalty scored); Kelly (penalty scored); Moore (penalty missed); Obita (penalty missed)

Wembley Stadium, London
Attendance: 76,682
Referee: Neil Swarbrick

== League One ==
=== League One Semi-finals ===
Final league position - League One
Pos	Team	Pld	W	D	L	GF	GA	GD	Pts
3	Scunthorpe United	46	24	10	12	80	54	+26	82
4	Fleetwood Town	46	23	13	10	64	43	+21	82
5	Bradford City	46	20	19	7	62	43	+19	79
6	Millwall	46	20	13	13	66	57	+9	73

First leg

4 May 2017
19:45 BST

Millwall	0–0	Scunthorpe United
	Report

The New Den, London
Attendance: 12,568
Referee: Andy Madley
4 May 2017
19:45 BST

Bradford City	1–0	Fleetwood Town
McArdle 77'	Report

Valley Parade, Bradford
Attendance: 15,696
Referee: Oliver Langford

Second leg

7 May 2017
18:30 BST

Scunthorpe United	2–3	Millwall
Toney 19'; Dawson 81'	Report	Morison 45', 58'; Gregory 52'

Glanford Park, Scunthorpe
Attendance: 7,190
Referee: Chris Kavanagh

Millwall won 3–2 on aggregate.

7 May 2017
18:30 BST

Fleetwood Town	0–0	Bradford City
	Report

Highbury Stadium, Fleetwood
Attendance: 5,076
Referee: David Coote

Bradford City won 1–0 on aggregate.

=== League One Final ===
20 May 2017
15:00 BST

Bradford City	0–1	Millwall
	Report	Morison 85'

Wembley Stadium, London
Attendance: 53,320
Referee: Simon Hooper

== League Two ==
=== League Two Semi-finals ===
Final league position - League Two
Pos	Team	Pld	W	D	L	GF	GA	GD	Pts
4	Luton Town	46	20	17	9	70	43	+27	77
5	Exeter City	46	21	8	17	75	56	+19	71
6	Carlisle United	46	18	17	11	69	68	+1	71
7	Blackpool	46	18	16	12	69	46	+23	70

First leg

14 May 2017
18:30

Blackpool	3–2	Luton Town
Cullen 19', 47', 67' (pen.)	Report	Potts 26'; Vassell 28'

Bloomfield Road, Blackpool
Attendance: 3,882
Referee: Nigel Miller
14 May 2017
18:30

Carlisle United	3–3	Exeter City
Moore-Taylor 32' (o.g.); O'Sullivan 71'; Miller 73'	Report	Grant 15'; Harley 45+1'; Wheeler 56'

Brunton Park, Carlisle
Attendance: 9,708
Referee: David Webb

Second leg

18 May 2017
19:45

Luton Town	3–3	Blackpool
Mellor 36' (o.g.); Cuthbert 45'; Hylton 57' (pen.)	Report	Delfouneso 22'; Gnanduillet 76'; Moore 90+5' (o.g.)

Kenilworth Road, Luton
Attendance: 10,032
Referee: Darren Deadman

Blackpool won 6–5 on aggregate.

18 May 2017
19:45

Exeter City	3–2	Carlisle United
Watkins 10', 79'; Stacey 90+5'	Report	Kennedy 81'; O'Sullivan 90'

St James Park, Exeter
Attendance: 7,450
Referee: Dean Whitestone

Exeter City won 6–5 on aggregate.

=== League Two Final ===
28 May 2017
15:00

Blackpool	2–1	Exeter City
Potts 3'; Cullen 64'		Wheeler 40'

Wembley Stadium, London
Attendance: 23,380
Referee: Darren England
