= 2017–18 Rotherham United F.C. season =

Rotherham United
2017–18 season
- Chairman: Tony Stewart
- Manager: Paul Warne
- Stadium: New York Stadium
- League One: 4th (promoted via playoffs)
- FA Cup: First round (eliminated by Crewe Alexandra)
- EFL Cup: Second round (eliminated by Huddersfield Town)
- EFL Trophy: Group stage
Home colours	Away colours	Third colours

The 2017–18 season was Rotherham United's 93rd season in their existence and their first back in League One following relegation in 2016–17. Along with competing in League One, the club also participated in the FA Cup, the EFL Cup and the EFL Trophy.

== Key events ==
On 23 August 2017, Rotherham United were knocked out of the EFL Cup by Premier League side Huddersfield Town in the second round. Despite taking the lead in the first minute, they conceded two goals early in the second half, and saw a Kieffer Moore shot cleared off the line late in the game.

On 3 September 2017, the team won 1–0 against Portsmouth, who were managed by their former manager Kenny Jackett in a televised match at Fratton Park. This recorded Rotherham's first away league win in 27 matches, extending back to 9 April 2016.

On 4 November 2017, the team were knocked out of the FA Cup at EFL League Two side Crewe Alexandra, who scored a late goal to turn the tie around and win 2–1.

Despite playing their last game in the group stage of the competition on 7 November 2017, Rotherham had to wait three weeks to know their EFL Trophy fate. A draw between Chesterfield and Manchester City EDS on 29 November confirmed the clubs exit.

From 9 December 2017 to 24 February 2018, the team went 14 league games unbeaten, winning 11, including the last 7. The run was ended on 10 March 2018 with a 1–0 home defeat against Rochdale.

Having held 4th place in the league since mid-February, Rotherham confirmed a place in the play-offs on 21 April 2018, with a 2–0 win against Bristol Rovers.

Rotherham secured promotion back to the EFL Championship with a 2–1 extra time victory against Shrewsbury Town at Wembley Stadium on 27 May 2018.

== Squad statistics ==
=== Player statistics ===
As of end of season.

Players with zero appearances have been unused substitutes in one or more games.

No.	Pos.	Nat.	Name	Total		League		Playoffs		FA Cup		EFL Cup		EFL Trophy		Discipline	
No.	Pos.	Nat.	Name	Apps	Goals	Apps	Goals	Apps	Goals	Apps	Goals	Apps	Goals	Apps	Goals	Yellow card	Red card
12	GK	(Wales)	Lewis Price	2	0	1	0	0	0	0	0	0	0	1	0	0	0
13	GK	(Slovakia)	Marek Rodák	38	0	35	0	3	0	0	0	0	0	0	0	2	0
30	GK	(England)	Laurence Bilboe	0	0	0	0	0	0	0	0	0	0	0	0	0	0
2	DF	(England)	Josh Emmanuel	37+1	0	30+1	0	3	0	1	0	1	0	2	0	3	0
3	DF	(England)	Joe Mattock	39+1	1	34+1	1	3	0	0	0	1	0	1	0	9	2
5	DF	(Nigeria)	Semi Ajayi	34+8	5	29+6	4	1+2	0	1	0	2	1	1	0	4	0
6	DF	(England)	Richard Wood	40+2	7	34+2	4	3	3	1	0	1	0	1	0	10	1
14	DF	(England)	Dominic Ball	2	0	0	0	0	0	0	0	1	0	1	0	0	0
18	DF	(England)	Ben Purrington	12	0	10	0	0	0	0	0	1	0	1	0	2	0
20	DF	(England)	Michael Ihiekwe	29+6	1	26+5	1	2	0	0+1	0	1	0	0	0	9	0
25	DF	(Jamaica)	Shaun Cummings	14+1	0	11+1	0	0	0	1	0	1	0	1	0	1	0
29	DF	(England)	Manny Onariase	2	0	0	0	0	0	0	0	0	0	2	0	0	0
43	DF	(England)	Akeem Hinds	2	0	0	0	0	0	0	0	0	0	2	0	0	0
4	MF	(England)	Will Vaulks	45+7	8	38+6	5	3	1	1	1	1+1	0	2	1	10	0
7	MF	(Republic of Ireland)	Anthony Forde	31+18	3	27+14	2	0+3	0	0	0	1+1	1	3	0	4	0
8	MF	(England)	Matt Palmer	12+4	0	10+4	0	2	0	0	0	0	0	0	0	1	0
11	MF	(England)	Jon Taylor	18+14	5	13+12	4	2+1	1	0+1	0	1	0	2	0	3	0
16	MF	(Republic of Ireland)	Darren Potter	18	0	16	0	0	0	1	0	1	0	0	0	4	0
17	MF	(Republic of Ireland)	Richie Towell	39+6	6	34+5	5	3	0	0+1	0	0	0	2	1	5	0
22	MF	(England)	Joe Newell	27+18	8	22+17	7	2+1	1	1	0	1	0	0+1	0	4	0
23	MF	(Australia)	Ryan Williams	37+10	4	33+9	4	2+1	0	1	0	1	0	0	0	5	0
27	MF	(Wales)	Alex Bray	1+3	0	0	0	0	0	0	0	0+1	0	1+2	0	0	0
40	MF	(England)	Ben Wiles	1+1	0	0	0	0	0	0	0	0	0	1+1	0	0	0
44	MF	(England)	Lewis Murr	0	0	0	0	0	0	0	0	0	0	0	0	0	0
45	MF	(England)	Reece McGinley	0+1	0	0	0	0	0	0	0	0	0	0+1	0	0	0
9	FW	(England)	Jamie Proctor	6	1	4	0	0	0	0	0	2	1	0	0	0	0
10	FW	(England)	David Ball	30+8	9	26+7	8	1	0	1	0	1	0	1+1	1	1	0
19	FW	(England)	Jonson Clarke-Harris	4+15	1	1+13	0	0	0	0	0	0+2	0	3	1	0	0
21	FW	(England)	Jerry Yates	10+10	2	7+10	1	0	0	0	0	0	0	3	1	0	0
24	FW	(England)	Michael Smith	21+2	6	18+2	6	3	0	0	0	0	0	0	0	3	0
31	FW	(Northern Ireland)	Caolan Lavery	1+14	2	1+13	2	0+1	0	0	0	0	0	0	0	0	0
42	FW	(England)	Joshua Kayode	0+2	0	0	0	0	0	0	0	0	0	0+2	0	0	0
Players played for the club this season on loan who returned to their parent club during the season:
24	FW	(England)	Kieffer Moore	21+4	13	19+3	13	0	0	1	0	1+1	0	0	0	5	1
Players played for the club this season who have since left:
1	GK	(England)	Richard O'Donnell	15	0	10	0	0	0	1	0	2	0	2	0	0	0
8	MF	(Republic of Ireland)	Lee Frecklington	18+2	4	17+2	4	0	0	0	0	1	0	0	0	2	0
41	FW	(England)	Akeel Francis	0	0	0	0	0	0	0	0	0	0	0	0	0	0

=== Goalscorers ===
As of end of season.

Place	Position	Nation	Number	Name	Total	League	Playoffs	FA Cup	EFL Cup	EFL Trophy
1	FW	(England)	24	Kieffer Moore	13	13	0	0	0	0
2	FW	(England)	10	David Ball	9	8	0	0	0	1
3	MF	(England)	22	Joe Newell	8	7	1	0	0	0
=	MF	(England)	4	Will Vaulks	8	5	1	1	0	1
5	DF	(England)	6	Richard Wood	7	4	3	0	0	0
6	FW	(England)	24	Michael Smith	6	6	0	0	0	0
=	MF	(Republic of Ireland)	17	Richie Towell	6	5	0	0	0	1
8	MF	(England)	11	Jon Taylor	5	4	1	0	0	0
=	DF	(Nigeria)	5	Semi Ajayi	5	4	0	0	1	0
10	MF	(Republic of Ireland)	8	Lee Frecklington	4	4	0	0	0	0
=	MF	(Australia)	23	Ryan Williams	4	4	0	0	0	0
12	MF	(Republic of Ireland)	7	Anthony Forde	3	2	0	0	1	0
13	FW	(Northern Ireland)	31	Caolan Lavery	2	2	0	0	0	0
=	FW	(England)	21	Jerry Yates	2	1	0	0	0	1
15	DF	(England)	3	Joe Mattock	1	1	0	0	0	0
=	DF	(England)	20	Michael Ihiekwe	1	1	0	0	0	0
=	FW	(England)	9	Jamie Proctor	1	0	0	0	1	0
=	FW	(England)	19	Jonson Clarke-Harris	1	0	0	0	0	1

== Pre-season friendlies ==
On 12 May 2017, Rotherham United announced they will host Sheffield United as part of their pre-season preparations. Four days later, the Millers added Parkgate friendly to the pre-season diary. On 17 May further friendlies at North Ferriby United and Chesterfield were confirmed. A fifth friendly, against Alfreton Town was revealed a day later. Two further friendlies, against Gainsborough Trinity and Barnsley were announced on 19 May.

The club announced a two-game training camp in Austria on 6 July 2017. The team will be based at the Sportschule Lindabrunn in Enzesfeld-Lindabrunn where they will face Hungarian side Soproni VSE. They will also play Floridsdorfer AC at the Austrian club's ground.

8 July 2017	Parkgate	2–6	Rotherham United	Parkgate
14:00 BST	Harris 8'; Emmett 29'	Report	Proctor 3', 31'; Forde 17'; David Ball 21', 36'; Newell 44'	Stadium: Roundwood Sports Complex

11 July 2017	Floridsdorfer AC	1–7	Rotherham United	Floridsdorf, Vienna, Austria
19:00 CEST	Gashi 50' (pen.)	Report	David Ball 12'; Moore 32', 36'; Taylor 43'; Ihiekwe 65'; Clarke-Harris 69'; Frecklington 89'	Stadium: FAC-Platz Stadium

15 July 2017	Rotherham United	2–0	Soproni VSE	Enzesfeld-Lindabrunn, Austria
17:00 CEST	Proctor 25'; David Ball 78'	Report		Stadium: Sportschule Lindabrunn

18 July 2017	Alfreton Town	0–2	Rotherham United	Alfreton
19:30 BST		Report	David Ball 15'; Taylor 38'	Stadium: North Street; Attendance: 243

18 July 2017	Gainsborough Trinity	0–1	Rotherham United	Gainborough
19:30 BST		Report	Proctor 31'	Stadium: The Northolme

21 July 2017	Rotherham United	1–2	Sheffield United	Rotherham
19:45 BST	Yates 86'	Report	Ihiekwe 68' (o.g.); Stevens 80'	Stadium: AESSEAL New York Stadium; Attendance: 7,396; Referee: Jonathan Moss

25 July 2017	Chesterfield	1–3	Rotherham United	Chesterfield
19:45 BST	O'Grady 87'	Report	David Ball 17'; Taylor 20'; Williams 79'	Stadium: Proact Stadium; Attendance: 2,498; Referee: James Adcock

26 July 2017	North Ferriby United	0–2	Rotherham United	North Ferriby
19:30 BST		Report	Williams 45'; McGinley 77'	Stadium: Grange Lane

29 July 2017	Rotherham United	4–0	Barnsley	Rotherham
15:00BST	Proctor 67', 73', 75'; Moore 90+1'	Report		Stadium: AESSEAL New York Stadium; Attendance: 4,234; Referee: Mark Haywood

== Competitions ==
=== League One ===
Pos	Team	Pld	W	D	L	GF	GA	GD	Pts	Promotion, qualification or relegation
2	Blackburn Rovers (P)	46	28	12	6	82	40	+42	96	Promotion to the EFL Championship
3	Shrewsbury Town	46	25	12	9	60	39	+21	87	Qualification for League One play-offs (Note: Four teams play for one spot and promotion to the EFL Championship.)
4	Rotherham United (O, P)	46	24	7	15	73	53	+20	79	Qualification for League One play-offs
5	Scunthorpe United	46	19	17	10	65	50	+15	74	Qualification for League One play-offs
6	Charlton Athletic	46	20	11	15	58	51	+7	71	Qualification for League One play-offs

Source: BBC Sport
Rules for classification: 1) Points; 2) Goal difference; 3) Number of goals scored
(O) Play-off winners; (P) Promoted

==== Results summary ====
Overall								Home						Away					
Pld	W	D	L	GF	GA	GD	Pts	W	D	L	GF	GA	GD	W	D	L	GF	GA	GD
46	24	7	15	73	53	+20	79	15	3	5	45	23	+22	9	4	10	28	30	−2

Last updated: 5 May 2018.

==== Matchday summary ====
Matchday	1	2	3	4	5	6	7	8	9	10	11	12	13	14	15	16	17	18	19	20	21	22	23	24	25	26	27	28	29	30	31	32	33	34	35	36	37	38	39	40	41	42	43	44	45	46
Ground	A	H	A	H	A	H	H	A	H	A	H	A	H	A	A	H	A	H	H	A	A	H	H	A	A	H	A	H	H	H	A	H	A	H	H	A	A	A	H	A	H	A	A	H	A	H
Result	L	W	L	L	W	W	W	L	W	L	W	W	W	L	D	L	D	L	L	L	W	D	W	W	W	D	D	W	W	W	W	W	W	W	L	L	W	L	D	L	W	D	W	W	L	W
Position	24	8	15	19	12	11	9	9	8	10	8	4	4	4	5	6	6	8	12	13	9	10	9	8	7	7	8	7	6	5	5	4	4	4	4	4	4	4	4	4	4	4	4	4	4	4

Updated to match(es) played on 5 May 2018. Source:
A = Away; H = Home; W = Win; D = Draw; L = Loss

==== Matches ====
5 August 2017 1	Fleetwood Town	2–0	Rotherham United	Fleetwood
15:00 BST	McAleny 16', 66'; Dempsey (yellow card) 80'; Bolger (yellow card) 84'	Report	Vaulks (yellow card) 42'	Stadium: Highbury Stadium; Attendance: 3,623; Referee: Robert Lewis

12 August 2017 2	Rotherham United	5–0	Southend United	Rotherham
15:00 BST	Moore 15', 16', 45+2', (yellow card) 70'; Newell 23', (yellow card) 88'; Williams 59'	Report	Cox (yellow card) 43'	Stadium: New York Stadium; Attendance: 8,004; Referee: Michael Salisbury

19 August 2017 3	Peterborough United	2–1	Rotherham United	Peterborough
15:00 BST	Marriott 47', 75'; Maddison (yellow card) 62'	Report	Ihiekwe (yellow card) 23'; Frecklington (yellow card) 43'; Moore 55' (yellow card) 90+4'; Newell (yellow card) 83'; Mattock (yellow card) 87'	Stadium: London Road Stadium; Attendance: 6,344; Referee: Ross Joyce

26 August 2017 4	Rotherham United	0–2	Charlton Athletic	Rotherham
15:00 BST	Mattock (yellow card) 42'; Ihiekwe (yellow card) 47'; Vaulks (yellow card) 90+4'	Report	Bauer 16'; Magennis (yellow card) 29' (goal) 66'; Holmes (yellow card) 83'	Stadium: New York Stadium; Attendance: 7,976; Referee: Trevor Kettle

3 September 2017 5	Portsmouth	0–1	Rotherham United	Milton
14:30 BST	Burgess (yellow card) 80'	Report	Taylor 36'; Potter (yellow card) 60'; Purrington (yellow card) 71'; Vaulks (yellow card) 90+5'	Stadium: Fratton Park; Attendance: 17,118; Referee: Gavin Ward

9 September 2017 6	Rotherham United	3–2	Bury	Rotherham
15:00 BST	Moore 20', 54'; Towell 89'	Report	Beckford 34'; Cameron (yellow card) 51' (goal) 67'; Whitmore (yellow card) 89'	Stadium: New York Stadium; Attendance: 7,848; Referee: Chris Sarginson

12 September 2017 7	Rotherham United	5–1	Walsall	Rotherham
19:45 BST	Frecklington 13', 31', 88'; Taylor 16', 24'	Report	Bakayoko (yellow card) 41' (goal) 49'	Stadium: New York Stadium; Attendance: 7,330; Referee: Scott Oldham

16 September 2017 8	Bradford City	1–0	Rotherham United	Bradford
15:00 BST	Vincelot (yellow card) 17' (goal) 21'; Gilliead (yellow card) 42'; Kilgallon (yellow card) 90'; Doyle (yellow card) 90+1'	Report	Wood (yellow card) 29'; Mattock (yellow card) 59' (yellow-red card) 90+4'; Moore (yellow card) 87'	Stadium: Valley Parade; Attendance: 20,881; Referee: Jeremy Simpson

23 September 2017 9	Rotherham United	5–1	Oldham Athletic	Rotherham
15:00 BST	Ihiekwe 8'; Taylor (yellow card) 31'; Moore 73', 78'; Forde 87'; Yates 89'	Report	Davies 21'; Gardner (yellow card) 32'; Edmundson (yellow card) 45'; Nepomuceno (yellow card) 68'	Stadium: New York Stadium; Attendance: 8,250; Referee: John Brooks

26 September 2017 10	Blackburn Rovers	2–0	Rotherham United	Blackburn
19:45 BST	Downing (yellow card) 23'; Antonsson 27'; Samuel (yellow card) 45+3'; Evans (yellow card) 71'; Chapman 85'	Report	Rodák (yellow card) 45+3'; Wood (yellow card) 80'; Vaulks (yellow card) 90'; Moore (yellow card) 90+4'	Stadium: Ewood Park; Attendance: 10,228; Referee: Mark Heywood

30 September 2017 11	Rotherham United	1–0	Northampton Town	Rotherham
15:00 BST	Moore 52'; Potter (yellow card) 82'; Ihiekwe (yellow card) 90+1'	Report	Pierre (yellow card) 43'	Stadium: New York Stadium; Attendance: 8,073; Referee: Trevor Kettle

7 October 2017 12	Rochdale	0–1	Rotherham United	Spotland
15:00 BST	Bunney (yellow card) 43'; Williams (yellow card) 46'; McNulty (yellow card) 56'; Henderson (yellow card) 69'	Report	Wood 57'; Potter (yellow card) 76'; Williams (yellow card) 90+5'	Stadium: Spotland Stadium; Attendance: 4,113; Referee: David Coote

14 October 2017 13	Rotherham United	2–0	Scunthorpe United	Rotherham
15:00 BST	Vaulks 37'; Ihiekwe (yellow card) 40'; Moore 71'; Williams (yellow card) 90'	Report	Townsend (yellow card) 78'	Stadium: New York Stadium; Attendance: 9,167; Referee: Darren Bond

17 October 2017 14	AFC Wimbledon	3–1	Rotherham United	Kingston upon Thames
19:45 BST	Taylor 15', 85', 90+2'	Report	Newell 70'; Forde (yellow card) 76'; Ball (yellow card) 78'	Stadium: Kingsmeadow; Attendance: 3,907; Referee: Dean Whitestone

21 October 2017 15	Oxford United	3–3	Rotherham United	Oxford
15:00 BST	Payne 21'; Ruffles 30'; Ledson (penalty missed) 33' (yellow card) 62'; Nelson 40'; Carroll (yellow card) 45'	Report	Newell 20'; Vaulks (yellow card) 33'; Williams 44'; Moore 78'; Mattock (yellow card) 90+2'	Stadium: Kassam Stadium; Attendance: 7,471; Referee: Seb Stockbridge

28 October 2017 16	Rotherham United	1–3	Gillingham	Rotherham
15:00 BST	Moore 56'; Wood (yellow card) 82'; Mattock (yellow card) 85' (yellow-red card) 85'	Report	Parker 2', 86'; Eaves 47'; Ogilvie (yellow card) 90+6'	Stadium: New York Stadium; Attendance: 7,865; Referee: Carl Boyeson

11 November 2017 17	Doncaster Rovers	1–1	Rotherham United	Doncaster
12:30 GMT	Wood 62' (o.g.); Lawlor (yellow card) 90+6'	Report	Ihiekwe (yellow card) 72'; Moore 90+6'	Stadium: Keepmoat Stadium; Attendance: 12,481; Referee: Graham Scott

18 November 2017 18	Rotherham United	1–2	Shrewsbury Town	Rotherham
15:00 GMT	Moore (penalty missed) 13'; Wood (yellow card) 58'; Towell 76'	Report	Nolan 16'; Ogogo (red card) 53'; Nsiala (yellow card) 58'; Payne 90+3'	Stadium: New York Stadium; Attendance: 8184; Referee: Robert Jones

25 November 2017 19	Rotherham United	1–3	Wigan Athletic	Rotherham
15:00 GMT	Ihiekwe (yellow card) 13'; Ball 16'; Wood (yellow card) 45+1'; Towell (yellow card) 47'	Report	Grigg 14'; Bruce 28'; Dunkley (yellow card) 56'; Jacobs 60'	Stadium: New York Stadium; Attendance: 8,443; Referee: Seb Stockbridge

2 December 2017 20	Bristol Rovers	2–1	Rotherham United	Bristol
15:00 GMT	Clarke (yellow card) 30'; Harrison 64'; Sercombe 75'; Smith (yellow card) 79'; Sweeney (yellow card) 81'	Report	Williams 56'; Moore (red card) 79'	Stadium: Memorial Stadium; Attendance: 7,531; Referee: Brett Huxtable

9 December 2017 21	Blackpool	1–2	Rotherham United	Blackpool
15:00 GMT	Mellor 21'; Daniel (yellow card) 63'	Report	Wood (yellow card) 28'; Ihiekwe (yellow card) 36'; Ball 76', 87'; Vaulks (yellow card) 82'	Stadium: Bloomfield Road; Attendance: 3,654; Referee: Peter Bankes

16 December 2017 22	Rotherham United	1–1	Plymouth Argyle	Rotherham
15:00 GMT	Towell (yellow card) 36'; Wood (yellow card) 42' (yellow card) 50' (yellow-red card); Ajayi 90+3'	Report	Carey (yellow card) 40'; Taylor 82' (yellow card) 83'	Stadium: New York Stadium; Attendance: 7,562; Referee: Andy Haines

23 December 2017 23	Rotherham United	2–1	Milton Keynes Dons	Rotherham
15:00 GMT	Ajayi 21' (yellow card) 67'; Vaulks 29'; Frecklington (yellow card) 41'	Report	Aneke 9' (yellow card) 79'; Ebanks-Landell (yellow card) 32'; McGrandles (yellow card) 90+5'	Stadium: New York Stadium; Attendance: 8,333; Referee: Darren Drysdale

26 December 2017 24	Bury	0–3	Rotherham United	Bury
15:00 GMT	Dawson (yellow card) 8'; Laurent (yellow card) 47'	Report	Ball 5'; Frecklington 10'; Williams (yellow card) 25'; Vaulks 83'; Forde (yellow card) 90+2'	Stadium: Gigg Lane; Attendance: 4,630; Referee: Anthony Blackhouse

30 December 2017 25	Walsall	1–2	Rotherham United	Bescot
15:00 GMT	Edwards 12'; Chambers (yellow card) 80'	Report	Ajayi 1'; Ball 58'; Wood (yellow card) 72'; Mattock (yellow card) 85'	Stadium: Bescot Stadium; Attendance: 4,685; Referee: Graham Salisbury

1 January 2018 26	Rotherham United	1–1	Blackburn Rovers	Rotherham
15:00 GMT	Ball 89'; Ajayi (yellow card) 90+4'	Report	Dack 66'; Mulgrew (yellow card) 77'	Stadium: New York Stadium; Attendance: 9,347; Referee: Martin Coy

13 January 2018 27	Oldham Athletic	1–1	Rotherham United	Oldham
15:00 GMT	Davies 31'; Pringle (yellow card) 90+5'	Report	Williams 7'; Vaulks (yellow card) 63'	Stadium: Boundary Park; Attendance: 4,775; Referee: Robert Lewis

20 January 2018 28	Rotherham United	1–0	Portsmouth	Rotherham
15:00 GMT	Emmanuel (yellow card) 31'; Mattock 90+1'	Report		Stadium: New York Stadium; Attendance: 9,129; Referee: Robert Jones

23 January 2018 29	Rotherham United	2–0	Bradford City	Rotherham
19:45 GMT	Smith 22'; Newell 57'	Report		Stadium: New York Stadium; Attendance: 8,904; Referee: Darren Drysdale

3 February 2018 30	Rotherham United	2–0	AFC Wimbledon	Rotherham
15:00 GMT	Smith 14'; Ball 90+2'	Report	Soares (yellow card) 28'	Stadium: New York Stadium; Attendance: 8,330; Referee: Michael Salisbury

10 February 2018 31	Scunthorpe United	1–2	Rotherham United	Scunthorpe
15:00 GMT	Novak 72' (yellow card) 90+5'; Vermijl (yellow card) 76'; Holmes (yellow card) 86'	Report	Newell 31'; Smith (yellow card) 55'; Ajayi 70' (yellow card) 80'; Emmanuel (yellow card) 90'; Forde (yellow card) 90+8'	Stadium: Glanford Park; Attendance: 6,359; Referee: Graham Salisbury

13 February 2018 32	Rotherham United	3–1	Oxford United	Rotherham
19:45 GMT	Forde 7'; Towell 29'; Smith 52'	Report	Henry 43'	Stadium: New York Stadium; Attendance: 7,707 (360 away); Referee: Eddie Ilderton

17 February 2018 33	Shrewsbury Town	0–1	Rotherham United	Shrewsbury
15:00 GMT	Beckles (yellow card) 71'	Report	Wood 44'; Newell (yellow card) 80'; Towell (yellow card) 90+3'	Stadium: New Meadow; Attendance: 7,007; Referee: Carl Boyeson

24 February 2018 34	Rotherham United	2–1	Doncaster Rovers	Rotherham
15:00 GMT	Smith 90+3'; Newell 90+13' (pen.)	Report	Coppinger (yellow card) 32'; Marquis 39'; Maroši (yellow card) 90+13'	Stadium: New York Stadium; Attendance: 11,275; Referee: Geoff Eltringham

10 March 2018 35	Rotherham United	0–1	Rochdale	Rotherham
15:00 GMT	Wood (yellow card) 88'; Newell (yellow card) 90+5'	Report	Humphrys 67'; Hart (yellow card) 86'; Davies (yellow card) 90+1'	Stadium: New York Stadium; Attendance: 8,418; Referee: Graham Salisbury

13 March 2018 36	Milton Keynes Dons	3–2	Rotherham United	Milton Keynes
19:45 GMT	Muirhead 36', 58'; Pawlett 42'; Ugbo (yellow card) 67'	Report	Ajayi 11'; Taylor 75'	Stadium: Stadium MK; Attendance: 7,327 (559 Rotherham fans); Referee: Michael Salisbury

17 March 2018 37	Northampton Town	0–3	Rotherham United	Northampton
15:00 GMT	van Veen (yellow card) 72'	Report	Taylor (yellow card) 14'; Smith 17'; Ajayi (yellow card) 37'; Mattock (yellow card) 60'; Ball 62'; Towell 81'	Stadium: Sixfields Stadium; Attendance: 5,882; Referee: Ben Toner

24 March 2018 38	Southend United	2–0	Rotherham United	Southend-on-Sea
15:00 GMT	McLaughlin 7'; Cox 79'	Report	Mattock (yellow card) 76'	Stadium: Roots Hall; Attendance: 7,719; Referee: Brett Huxtable

29 March 2018 39	Rotherham United	1–1	Peterborough United	Rotherham
15:00 BST	Lavery 68'; Smith (yellow card) 90+5'	Report	Tafazolli (yellow card) 59'; Morias (yellow card) 72'; Marriott 90+8'	Stadium: New York Stadium; Attendance: 9,573; Referee: Scott Oldham

2 April 2018 40	Charlton Athletic	3–1	Rotherham United	Charlton, London
15:00 BST	Żyro 28' (yellow card) 49'; Forster-Caskey (yellow card) 45+1'; Aribo 54', 65'; Amos (yellow card) 90+1'	Report	Wood 77'	Stadium: The Valley; Attendance: 11,871; Referee: Graham Horwood

7 April 2018 41	Rotherham United	3–2	Fleetwood Town	Rotherham
15:00 BST	Pond 12' (o.g.); Newell 51'; Wood 77'	Report	Eastham 5'; Bolger 54' (yellow card) 76'	Stadium: New York Stadium; Attendance: 7,562; Referee: Carl Boyeson

14 April 2018 42	Wigan Athletic	0–0	Rotherham United	Wigan
15:00 BST	Byrne (yellow card) 32'	Report	Emmanuel (yellow card) 38'; Vaulks (yellow card) 39'; Ihiekwe (yellow card) 90+1'	Stadium: DW Stadium; Attendance: 9,630; Referee: Chris Sarginson

17 April 2018 43	Gillingham	0–1	Rotherham United	Gillingham
19:45 BST		Report	Vaulks 20', (yellow card) 87'; Smith (yellow card) 45+2'; Towell (yellow card) 64'	Stadium: Priestfield Stadium; Attendance: 4,029; Referee: Dean Whitestone

21 April 2018 44	Rotherham United	2–0	Bristol Rovers	Rotherham
15:00 BST	Smith 9'; Lavery 90'	Report	Harrison (yellow card) 77'	Stadium: New York Stadium; Attendance: 8,579; Referee: Andy Haines

28 April 2018 45	Plymouth Argyle	2–1	Rotherham United	Plymouth
15:00 BST	Grant 56'; Carey 90+1' (pen.)	Report	Towell 33'; Williams (yellow card) 51'; Rodák (yellow card) 90+2'	Stadium: Home Park; Attendance: 13,407; Referee: Darren Handley

5 May 2018 46	Rotherham United	1–0	Blackpool	Rotherham
15:00 BST	Ihiekwe (yellow card) 20'; Vaulks 58'	Report		Stadium: New York Stadium; Attendance: 9,512; Referee: Ross Joyce

==== League One play-offs ====
12 May 2018 Semi-Final 1st Leg	Scunthorpe United	2–2	Rotherham United	Scunthorpe
12:30 BST	Ihiekwe 18' (o.g.); Wallace (yellow card) 38'; McGeehan 88'	Report	Taylor 17', (yellow card) 55'; Wood (yellow card) 40'; Palmer (yellow card) 50'; Newell 64'	Stadium: Glanford Park; Attendance: 6,591; Referee: Tim Robinson

16 May 2018 Semi-Final 2nd Leg	Rotherham United	2–0 (4–2 agg.)	Scunthorpe United	Rotherham
19:45 BST	Wood 45+2'; Vaulks 63'; Forde (yellow card) 90'	Report	Toney (yellow card) 52'; McArdle (yellow card) 53' (red card) 77'	Stadium: New York Stadium; Attendance: 11,061; Referee: Scott Duncan

27 May 2018 Final	Rotherham United	2–1 (a.e.t.)	Shrewsbury Town	London
15:00 BST	Wood 32', 103'	Report	Whalley (yellow card) 27'; Bolton (yellow card) 38'; Rodman 58'; Sadler (yellow card) 103'	Stadium: Wembley Stadium; Attendance: 26,218; Referee: Robert Jones

=== FA Cup ===
On 16 October 2017, Rotherham United were drawn away to Crewe Alexandra in the first round.

4 November 2017 First round	Crewe Alexandra	2–1	Rotherham United	Crewe
15:00 GMT	Walker 47' (yellow card) 72'; Ainley 89'	Report	Vaulks 21'; Williams (yellow card) 59'; Cummings (yellow card) 63'; Moore (yellow card) 90+3'	Stadium: Gresty Road; Attendance: 2,597; Referee: Scott Oldham

=== EFL Cup ===
On 16 June 2017, Rotherham United were drawn at home to Lincoln City in the first round.

8 August 2017 First round	Rotherham United	2–1	Lincoln City	Rotherham
19:45 BST	Mattock (yellow card) 18'; Proctor 39'; Forde 78'	Report	Raggett (yellow card) 55'; Knott 64'	Stadium: AESSEAL New York Stadium; Attendance: 5,489; Referee: Seb Stockbridge

23 August 2017 Second round	Huddersfield Town	2–1	Rotherham United	Huddersfield
19:45 BST	Billing 52' (pen.); Lolley 55'; Hefele (yellow card) 89'	Report	Ajayi 1'; Purrington (yellow card) 89'	Stadium: Kirklees Stadium; Attendance: 8,290; Referee: Peter Bankes

=== EFL Trophy ===
Pos	Lge	Team	Pld	W	PW	PL	L	GF	GA	GD	Pts	Qualification
1	L1	Bradford City (Q)	3	2	0	0	1	6	6	0	6	Round 2
2	L2	Chesterfield (Q)	3	1	1	0	1	6	7	−1	5	Round 2
3	L1	Rotherham United (E)	3	1	0	1	1	5	3	+2	4	
4	ACA	Manchester City EDS (E)	3	0	1	1	1	4	5	−1	3	

Updated to match(es) played on 7 November 2017. Source: EFL.com
(E) Eliminated; (Q) Qualified to the phase indicated

15 August 2017	Rotherham United	1–1 (2–4 p)	Manchester City EDS	Rotherham
19:00 BST	Will Vaulks (yellow card) 48'; David Ball 64'	Report	Garré 90+4'	Stadium: New York Stadium; Attendance: 2,562; Referee: Anthony Backhouse
	Penalties
	Vaulks (penalty missed); Taylor (penalty missed); Forde (penalty scored); Clarke-Harris (penalty scored)		Nmecha (penalty scored); Smith (penalty scored); Richards (penalty scored); Davenport (penalty missed); Oliver (penalty scored)

3 October 2017	Rotherham United	1–2	Chesterfield	Rotherham
19:00 BST	Vaulks 71'	Report	De Girolamo 9'; McCourt 89'	Stadium: New York Stadium; Attendance: 2,043; Referee: Darren Handley

7 November 2017	Bradford City	0–3	Rotherham United	Bradford
19:30 GMT		Report	Yates 17'; Clarke-Harris 31' (pen.); Towell (yellow card) 43' (goal) 45+1'	Stadium: Valley Parade; Attendance: 931; Referee: Rob Lewis

== Transfers ==
=== Transfers in ===
Date from	Nationality	Name	From	Fee	Ref.
1 July 2017	(Nigeria)	Semi Ajayi	Cardiff City	Undisclosed	
1 July 2017	(England)	David Ball	Fleetwood Town	Free	
1 July 2017	(Wales)	Alex Bray	Swansea City	Undisclosed	
1 July 2017	(England)	Michael Ihiekwe	Tranmere Rovers	Free	
1 July 2017	(Republic of Ireland)	Darren Potter	Milton Keynes Dons	Free	
1 July 2017	(Australia)	Ryan Williams	Barnsley	Free	
3 July 2017	(England)	Jamie Proctor	Bolton Wanderers	Undisclosed	
9 August 2017	(Jamaica)	Shaun Cummings	Millwall	Free	
31 August 2017	(England)	Manny Onariase	Brentford	Undisclosed	
11 January 2018	(England)	Michael Smith	Bury	Undisclosed	
25 January 2018	(England)	Matt Palmer	Burton Albion	Undisclosed	

=== Transfers out ===
Date from	Nationality	Name	To	Fee	Ref.
1 July 2017	(England)	Fabian Bailey	Free agent	Released	
1 July 2017	(Northern Ireland)	Lee Camp	Free agent (Note: Camp subsequently signed for Cardiff City.)	Released	
1 July 2017	(Wales)	Chris Dawson	Free agent	Released	
1 July 2017	(Sweden)	Joel Ekstrand	Free agent	Released	
1 July 2017	(Republic of Ireland)	Stephen Kelly	Free agent	Released	
1 July 2017	(England)	Tom Rose	Free agent	Released	
1 July 2017	(England)	Richard Smallwood	Free agent (Note: Smallwood subsequently signed for Blackburn Rovers.)	Released	
1 July 2017	(England)	Tom Thorpe	Free agent (Note: Thorpe subsequently signed for Atlético de Kolkata.)	Released	
1 July 2017	(England)	Danny Ward	Cardiff City	Undisclosed	
1 July 2017	(England)	Kelvin Wilson	Free agent	Released	
4 July 2017	(Scotland)	Kirk Broadfoot	Kilmarnock	Undisclosed	
12 July 2017	(Antigua and Barbuda)	Dexter Blackstock	Free agent	Released	
26 July 2017	(England)	Darnell Fisher	Preston North End	Undisclosed	
31 August 2017	(Tunisia)	Aymen Belaïd	Free agent	Mutual consent	
8 January 2018	(England)	Richard O'Donnell	Northampton Town	Undisclosed fee	
11 January 2018	(Republic of Ireland)	Lee Frecklington	Lincoln City	Undisclosed fee	
11 January 2018	(England)	Akeel Francis	Accrington Stanley	Free	

=== Loans in ===
Start date	Nationality	Name	From	End date	Ref.
10 July 2017	(England)	Kieffer Moore	Ipswich Town	30 June 2018	
13 July 2017	(England)	Josh Emmanuel	Ipswich Town	30 June 2018	
30 August 2017	(Slovakia)	Marek Rodák	Fulham	30 June 2018	
31 August 2017	(Republic of Ireland)	Richie Towell	Brighton & Hove Albion	30 June 2018	
29 January 2018	(Northern Ireland)	Caolan Lavery	Sheffield United	30 June 2018	

=== Loans out ===
Start date	Nationality	Name	To	End date	Ref.
4 August 2017	(England)	Mason Warren	Boston United	1 September 2017	
10 August 2017	(England)	Darnelle Bailey-King	Matlock Town	6 September 2017	
10 August 2017	(England)	Ben Wiles	Frickley Athletic	6 September 2017	
?? August 2017	(England)	Akeel Francis	North Ferriby United	?? September 2017	
31 August 2017	(England)	Dominic Ball	Aberdeen	9 June 2018	
12 September 2017	(England)	Darnelle Bailey-King	North Ferriby United	9 November 2017	(Note: On 24 October, Darnelle Bailey-King's loan at North Ferriby United was extended.)
22 September 2017	(England)	Kuda Muskwe	North Ferriby United	21 November 2017	(Note: On 24 October, Kuda Muskwe's loan at North Ferriby United was extended.)
22 September 2017	(England)	Mason Warren	North Ferriby United	7 November 2017	(Note: On 24 October, Mason Warren's loan at North Ferriby United was extended.) (Note: On 7 November, Rotherham exercised the option to recall Mason Warren.)
13 November 2017	(England)	Mason Warren	North Ferriby United	11 December 2017	
1 December 2017	(England)	Kuda Muskwe	Nuneaton Town	1 January 2018	
11 December 2017	(England)	Mason Warren	Gainsborough Trinity	10 January 2018	
15 December 2017	(England)	Laurence Bilboe	Brighouse Town	14 January 2018	
1 January 2018	(England)	Manny Onariase	Cheltenham Town	End of season	
31 January 2018	(Wales)	Alex Bray	Forest Green Rovers	End of season	
31 January 2018	(England)	Jonson Clarke-Harris	Coventry City	End of season	
