= 2018 EFL League One play-off final =

2018 association football match between Rotherham United and Shrewsbury Town

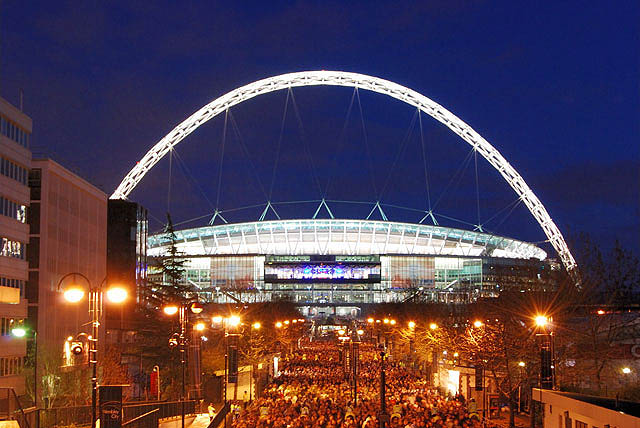
- Wembley Stadium hosted the final
| Rotherham United | Shrewsbury Town |
| 2 | 1 |
- After extra time
- Date: 27 May 2018
- Venue: Wembley Stadium, London
- Referee: Robert Jones
- Attendance: 26,218

The 2018 EFL League One play-off final was an association football match which was played on 27 May 2018 at Wembley Stadium, London, between Rotherham United and Shrewsbury Town to determine the third and final team to gain promotion from EFL League One to the EFL Championship. The top two teams of the 2017–18 EFL League One season gained automatic promotion to the Championship, while the teams placed from third to sixth place in the table partook in play-off semi-finals; the winners of these semi-finals competed for the final place for the 2018–19 season in the Championship.

Rotherham had reached the play-off final in their first season back in the third tier of English football, having been relegated from the Championship in the 2017–18 season. The two clubs had faced one another at Wembley before, in the 1996 Football League Trophy Final. The 2018 final was watched by a crowd of more than 26,000 people and refereed by Robert Jones. Shrewsbury's goalkeeper Dean Henderson saved an early Rotherham penalty before Rotherham took the lead with a Richard Wood goal. Shrewsbury equalised through a second-half Alex Rodman strike, forcing the match into extra time. Late in the first half, Wood scored his and Rotherham's second, and the match ended 2–1.

Shrewsbury Town ended the next season in 18th place, five points above the relegation zone. Rotherham United finished 22nd in the 2018–19 EFL Championship, four points from safety and having conceded the most goals in the division, and were relegated back to League One.

== Route to the final ==
Football League One final table, leading positions
| Pos | Team | Pld | W | D | L | GF | GA | GD | Pts |
|---|---|---|---|---|---|---|---|---|---|
| 1 | Wigan Athletic | 46 | 29 | 11 | 6 | 89 | 29 | +60 | 98 |
| 2 | Blackburn Rovers | 46 | 28 | 12 | 6 | 82 | 40 | +42 | 96 |
| 3 | Shrewsbury Town | 46 | 25 | 12 | 9 | 60 | 39 | +21 | 87 |
| 4 | Rotherham United | 46 | 24 | 7 | 15 | 73 | 53 | +20 | 79 |
| 5 | Scunthorpe United | 46 | 19 | 17 | 10 | 65 | 50 | +15 | 74 |
| 6 | Charlton Athletic | 46 | 20 | 11 | 15 | 58 | 51 | +7 | 71 |

Shrewsbury Town finished the regular 2017–18 season in third place in EFL League One, the third tier of the English football league system, one place ahead of Rotherham United. Both therefore missed out on the two automatic places for promotion to the EFL Championship and instead took part in the play-offs to determine the third promoted team. Shrewsbury finished nine points behind Blackburn Rovers (who were promoted in second place) and eleven behind league winners Wigan Athletic. Rotherham United ended the season eight points behind Shrewsbury.

Rotherham faced Scunthorpe United in their play-off semi-final, with the first leg being played away at Glanford Park. Jon Taylor scored after 17 minutes to take the lead for Rotherham but Scunthorpe equalised almost immediately through an own goal from Michael Ihiekwe. Joe Newell, a second-half substitute, put Rotherham back in front in the 64th minute after Scunthorpe goalkeeper Matt Gilks was replaced after suffering a knee injury. With two minutes remaining, Cameron McGeehan restored parity once again and the match ended 2–2. The second leg was played four days later at Rotherham's New York Stadium. Richard Wood put Rotherham ahead with a headed goal in additional time in the first half, and Will Vaulks extended their lead with a close-range strike. The Scunthorpe captain Rory McArdle was sent off after receiving two yellow cards and the match ended 2–0 to Rotherham, who progressed to the final with a 4–2 aggregate victory.

Shrewsbury's opponents in their play-off semi-final were Charlton Athletic, with the first leg being played away at The Valley. The first half was goalless and with ten minutes remaining in the second, Jon Nolan's 20-yard (18 m) half-volley from a Stefan Payne pass put Shrewsbury into a 1–0 lead which they held onto until the final whistle. The second leg was played at Shrewsbury's New Meadow three days later. A second-half strike from Carlton Morris was the only goal of the game, and the match ended 1–0, with Shrewsbury qualifying for the final, winning 2–0 on aggregate.

| Shrewsbury Town | | | Round | Rotherham United |
|---|---|---|---|---|---|---|
| Opponent | Result | Legs | Semi-finals | Opponent | Result | Legs |
| Charlton Athletic | 2–0 | 1–0 away; 1–0 home | | Scunthorpe United | 4–2 | 2–2 away; 2–0 home |

== Match ==
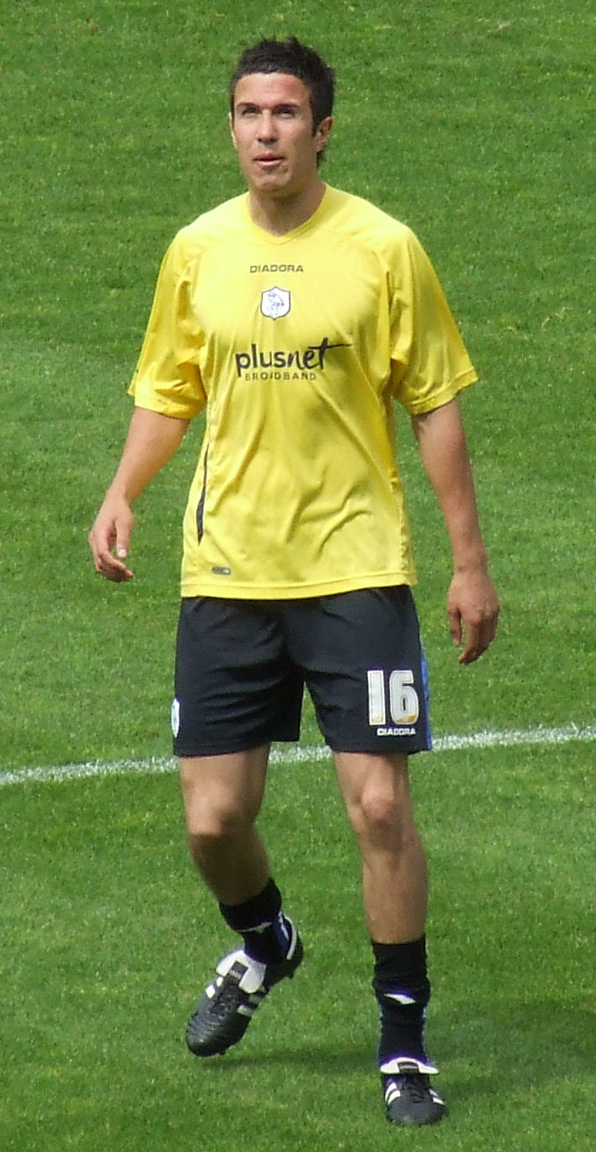
Richard Wood (pictured in 2007) scored both goals for Rotherham.

=== Background ===
Rotherham United had featured in two play-off finals prior to 2018, losing the 2010 Football League Two play-off final to Dagenham & Redbridge and the 2014 Football League One play-off final where they defeated Leyton Orient after a penalty shootout. Shrewsbury Town had also played in two play-off finals, both unsuccessfully. They lost the 2007 Football League Two play-off final 3–1 to Bristol Rovers and then were defeated by Gillingham in the 2009 final. Shrewsbury had also lost in two other finals hosted at Wembley Stadium, against Rotherham in the 1996 Football League Trophy Final and League Two team Lincoln City in the 2018 EFL Trophy Final, held the month prior to this play-off final. During the regular season, both teams had won their away games, Shrewsbury winning 2–1 in November 2017 and Rotherham victorious 1–0 the following February. The play-off final was Shrewsbury's 62nd competitive match of the season. The on-loan striker Kieffer Moore was Rotherham's highest scorer during the season with thirteen goals, despite having left the club in January, while Payne was Shrewsbury's top marksman with eleven.

Shrewsbury Town had not played in the second tier of English football since their relegation from the 1988–89 Second Division, while Rotherham were attempting to restore their place in the EFL Championship having been relegated in the 2016–17 season. The Shrewsbury Town manager Paul Hurst had spent almost his entire playing career at Rotherham, and coming into the game there was considerable speculation in the media over whether he would be taking the vacant position at Championship club Ipswich Town, regardless of the result of the play-off final. Paul Warne, the Rotherham manager, had played alongside Hurst for the club for five years.

Robert Jones was the referee for the match, with assistants Neil Davies and Dan Robathan, and Scott Duncan acted as the fourth official. Jones had officiated the regular season fixture between the clubs in which he sent off Shrewsbury captain Abu Ogogo. Rotherham were considered to be favourites to win the match by bookmakers. Shrewsbury Town's starting lineup was unchanged from the second leg of the semi-final win against Charlton with Morris starting as striker ahead of the top scorer Payne. Rotherham United made three changes to the team that defeated Scunthorpe, bringing Semi Ajayi, David Ball and Taylor back.

=== First half ===
Rotherham United kicked the game off at 3:03 p.m. in front of a Wembley crowd of 26,218 in hot conditions. After early pressing from Shrewsbury, Rotherham's Ball's cross went close to Newell before Ball himself was brought down by Toto Nsiala. Joe Mattock's challenge on Shaun Whalley drew another free kick, which came to nothing before, on 7 minutes, Rotherham were denied a penalty after the ball struck Nsiala's arm, instead earning a corner. Two minutes later, Omar Beckles brought Wood down in the Shrewsbury area to concede a penalty. Ball stepped up to take it but it was saved by Dean Henderson, the Shrewsbury goalkeeper who was on loan from Manchester United. On fourteen minutes, Nolan won a corner from which Alex Rodman's shot was blocked. Ball's shot ten minutes later was blocked and the resulting corner from Taylor was gathered by Henderson. Whalley received the first yellow card of the match on 27 minutes for a foul on Beckles. In the 30th minute, Morris headed Nolan's cross past Rotherham's post, but a minute later Rotherham took the lead. Wood evaded Beckles for the first time in the match, and his header from a Newell corner beat Henderson. Shrewsbury's James Bolton was the second to receive a yellow card, in the 38th minute for a foul on Wood. Richie Towell's late first half shot from 30 yards (27 m) flew over the crossbar, before the half ended, with Rotherham leading 1–0.

=== Second half ===
No changes to the teams were made during half time, and Shrewsbury got the second half underway. Carlton Morris' early cross found no-one before, on 54 minutes, the midfielder Bryn Morris went down with a hamstring injury after an aerial challenge with Josh Emmanuel. Unable to continue, Bryn Morris was replaced by the striker Payne, and four minutes later Shrewsbury equalised. A free kick from Whalley to Mat Sadler was passed back to Rodman who turned it past the Rotherham goalkeeper, Marek Rodák, to make it 1–1. Despite seeming to recover from an injury after a clash with Wood, Carlton Morris was replaced on 64 minutes by Lenell John-Lewis. In the 69th minute, Vaulks' shot was saved by Henderson, before Rotherham made their first substitution of the afternoon with Caolan Lavery coming on to replace Ball. Newell's shot was straight at the goalkeeper, and Joe Riley was then brought on for Bolton. Lavery then took the ball in space but his shot curled wide of the Shrewsbury post. With fifteen minutes of regular time remaining, Ryan Williams was brought on for Taylor. Two chances were missed by Lavery before John-Lewis' shot went wide of Rodak's post. Michael Smith then saw his shot saved, and with chances at either end missed, the match went into five minutes of additional time. In the final moments, a Williams shot was saved by Henderson and the second half ended 1–1, sending the match into extra time.

=== Extra time ===
Four minutes into extra time, Newell struck a shot wide of the Shrewsbury post before a run from Ben Godfrey was blocked by Rotherham's Emmanuel. Rodman received treatment for a head wound before Newell's free kick was pushed away by Henderson. After thirteen minutes, Shrewsbury's captain Sadler was booked for a foul on Williams. A free kick from Newell was then headed in by Wood off the post to give Rotherham a 2–1 lead. Ajayi then blocked an attempt from Payne and Wood cleared, and the half came to an end. Five minutes into the second half, Newell was taken off and replaced by Anthony Forde. Despite chances for both sides, no further goals were scored and the match ended 2–1 to Rotherham.

=== Details ===
27 May 2018
15:03 BST

| Rotherham United | 2–1 (a.e.t.) | Shrewsbury Town |
|---|---|---|
| Wood 32', 103' | Report | Rodman 58' |

Wembley Stadium, London
Attendance: 26,218
Referee: Robert Jones

| Rotherham United | Shrewsbury Town |

| 13 | Marek Rodák |
| 2 | Josh Emmanuel |
| 5 | Semi Ajayi |
| 6 | Richard Wood |
| 3 | Joe Mattock |
| 17 | Richie Towell |
| 4 | Will Vaulks |
| 11 | Jon Taylor | (substituted off) 75' |
| 10 | David Ball | (substituted off) 71' |
| 22 | Joe Newell | (substituted off) 111' |
| 24 | Michael Smith |
Substitutes:
| 12 | Lewis Price |
| 25 | Shaun Cummings |
| 18 | Ben Purrington |
| 7 | Anthony Forde | (substituted in) 111' |
| 8 | Matt Palmer |
| 23 | Ryan Williams | (substituted in) 75' |
| 31 | Caolan Lavery | (substituted in) 71' |
Manager:
Paul Warne

| 1 | Dean Henderson |
| 13 | James Bolton | (yellow card) 38' | (substituted off) 73' |
| 22 | Aristote Nsiala |
| 5 | Mat Sadler | (yellow card) 103' |
| 6 | Omar Beckles |
| 7 | Shaun Whalley | (yellow card) 27' |
| 16 | Bryn Morris | (substituted off) 56' |
| 4 | Ben Godfrey |
| 23 | Alex Rodman |
| 20 | Jon Nolan |
| 9 | Carlton Morris | (substituted off) 66' |
Substitutes:
| 15 | Craig MacGillivray |
| 12 | Junior Brown |
| 3 | Max Lowe |
| 2 | Joe Riley | (substituted in) 73' |
| 19 | Sam Jones |
| 14 | Lenell John-Lewis | (substituted in) 66' |
| 45 | Stefan Payne | (substituted in) 56' |
Manager:
Paul Hurst

=== Statistics ===
Statistics
| | Rotherham | Shrewsbury |
|---|---|---|
| Goals scored | 2 | 1 |
| Shots on target | 7 | 2 |
| Shots off target | 14 | 5 |
| Fouls committed | 15 | 19 |
| Corner kicks | 11 | 3 |
| Yellow cards | 0 | 3 |
| Red cards | 0 | 0 |

== Post-match ==
Wood, the scorer of both Rotherham's goals, said: "I am speechless. We've come so far from last season, it was terrible. To turn it around in the manager great credit. To get a brace has never been heard of." His manager Warne noted: "They went toe to toe with us, I am really proud of my group of lads. It was a horrendous 12 months last year ... The only person I didn't want to beat was [Shrewsbury manager Paul Hurst] Hursty, but Hursty will go on to great things". It was the first time since 2007 that all three teams relegated the previous season were promoted. After guiding Shrewsbury to their highest finishing position in the league in 27 years, Hurst left the club three days after the final to join Ipswich Town. He was sacked less than five months later after leading Ipswich to one win in fourteen league matches.

Shrewsbury Town ended the next season in 18th place, 5 points above the relegation zone but 23 below the play-offs. Rotherham United finished 22nd in the 2018–19 EFL Championship, 4 points from safety and having conceded the most goals in the division, and were relegated back to League One for the 2019–20 season.
