= Semi Ajayi =

Nigerian footballer (born 1993)

- Ajayi in 2026

Personal information
- Full name: Oluwasemilogo Adesewo Ibidapo Ajayi
- Date of birth: 9 November 1993 (age 33)
- Place of birth: Crayford, England
- Height: 1.93 m (6 ft 4 in)
- Position: Centre-back

Team information
- Current team: Hull City
- Number: 6

Youth career
- 2003–2012: Charlton Athletic
- 2013–2015: Arsenal

Senior career*
Years	Team	Apps	(Gls)
2012–2013	Charlton Athletic	0	(0)
2012	→ Dartford (loan)	3	(1)
2013–2015	Arsenal	0	(0)
2015	→ Cardiff City (loan)	0	(0)
2015–2017	Cardiff City	0	(0)
2015	→ AFC Wimbledon (loan)	5	(0)
2015–2016	→ Crewe Alexandra (loan)	13	(0)
2017	→ Rotherham United (loan)	17	(1)
2017–2019	Rotherham United	81	(11)
2019–2025	West Bromwich Albion	170	(12)
2025–	Hull City	23	(2)

International career^{‡}
2013	Nigeria U20	3	(0)
2018–	Nigeria	61	(2)
Medal record
Men's football
Representing Nigeria
Africa Cup of Nations
Runner-up	2023
Third place	2025
- * Club domestic league appearances and goals as of 19:17, 22 August 2026 (UTC) ‡ National team caps and goals as of 23:30, 17 November 2026 (UTC)

Oluwasemilogo Adesewo Ibidapo "Semi" Ajayi MON (born 9 November 1993) is a professional footballer who plays as a centre-back for Premier League club Hull City. Born in England, he plays for the Nigeria national team.

== Club career ==
=== Charlton Athletic ===
Born to Nigerian parents, Ajayi began his football career as a youth product of the Charlton Athletic academy. After progressing through the Charlton Athletic ranks, he was offered his first professional contract in January 2012.

In November 2012, Ajayi joined Dartford on a short-term loan for twenty-eight days. Shortly after, he made his Dartford debut, in a 4–0 win over Kingstonian in the FA Trophy and then scored his first goal for the side, in a 3–2 loss against Tamworth. Ajayi played 3 games and scored 1 goal before returning to his parent club in late December.

After returning to Charlton Athletic, Ajayi played for the reserve side for the rest of the season and helped them win the Professional Development League 2. Along the way, he was an unused substitute in the senior side for a game against Blackpool on 12 January 2013.

=== Arsenal ===
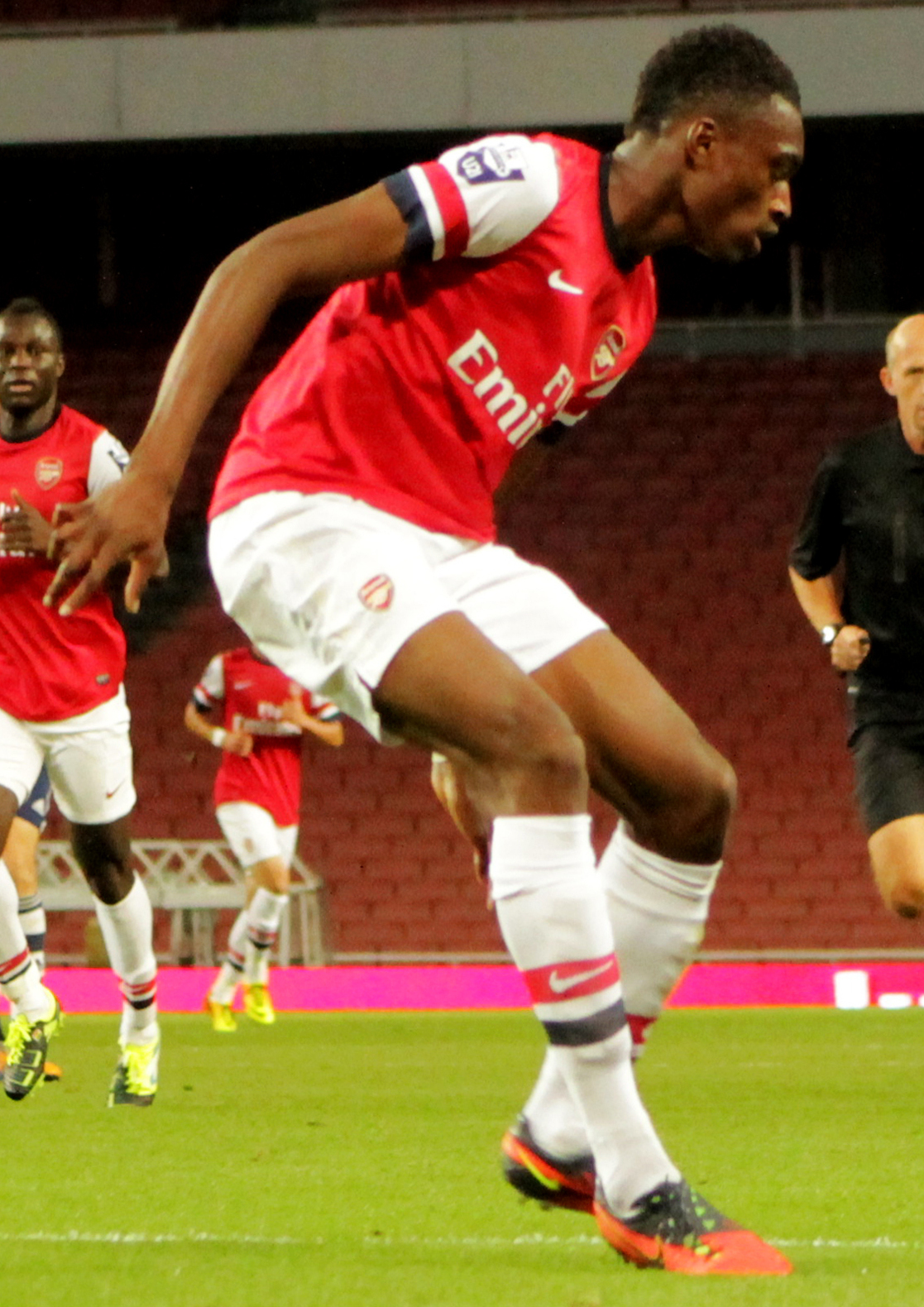
Ajayi playing for Arsenal in 2012.

Shortly before he was due to make his debut for the Charlton first team, Ajayi caught the eye of Premier League team Arsenal. Ajayi joined the Arsenal Academy on a two-year deal after impressing as a trialist with the club in September 2013.

Ajayi made his Arsenal U21 debut as a trialist against Blackburn Rovers on 30 August 2013, scoring with a header, in a 3–0 win. Ajayi, who first figured for Arsenal's senior team in a friendly against Boreham Wood, made the Arsenal bench four times during the 2014–15 season. He was an unused substitute in games against Hull City, Stoke City and Newcastle in the Premier League, as well as in the home League Cup defeat by Southampton.

=== Cardiff City ===
On 25 March 2015, Ajayi joined Championship team Cardiff City on loan until the end of the 2014–15 season but did not feature for the first team. At the end of the season, Ajayi joined Cardiff on a two-year permanent deal following the end of his contract at Arsenal

In the 2014–15 season, Ajayi was given a number twenty-nine shirt for the new season. However, Ajayi appeared twice as an unused substitute, both of them came in the League Cup campaign against AFC Wimbledon and MK Dons.

=== Loan spells ===
On 29 September 2015, Ajayi joined League Two side AFC Wimbledon on a month loan deal. He made his debut for the Dons on the same day in a 1–1 draw against Northampton Town. After impressing in his first couple of games, he was keen to extend his loan spell at AFC Wimbledon for more first team opportunities. However, after making five appearances for the side, Ajayi returned to his parent club at the end of the original loan period.

On 26 November 2015, Ajayi joined League One side Crewe Alexandra on loan until 5 January 2016. After his debut against Oldham Athletic two days later, Ajayi was named in the Football League Team of the Week which covers all three Football League divisions. Following several more impressive displays for Crewe, his loan spell was extended to 27 February, the maximum 93-day term allowed under the emergency loan rule. On 13 February 2016, with chances of further loan extension reported as slim, he set up a goal for Brad Inman in a 1–1 draw against Walsall. After making his last appearance against Chesterfield on 20 February 2016, he returned to his parent club.

=== Rotherham United ===
On 30 January 2017, Ajayi signed a loan deal until the end of the 2016–17 season with fellow Championship strugglers Rotherham United. The following day, he made his Rotherham United debut, starting and playing the whole game, in a 2–0 defeat against Nottingham Forest. Several weeks later, on 14 February 2017, he scored his first Rotherham United goal, in a 3–2 defeat against Huddersfield Town. Ajayi was a first team regular for the rest of the season and made seventeen appearances. On 28 March 2017, Ajayi signed for the club on a permanent deal, to be completed on 1 July 2017. He was part of the side which earned promotion to The Championship after beating Shrewsbury in the play-off final on 27 May 2018.

On 12 April, he won the EFL Championship Player of the Month for March 2019. At the club's end of season awards for the 2018/19 season, Ajayi won the Away Player Of The Season Award after scoring 8 goals in 49 games in all competitions, and also the Goal of the Season for his long range strike against Leeds United in a 2–1 defeat on 26 January 2019.

=== West Bromwich Albion ===
On 20 July 2019, Ajayi signed for West Bromwich Albion for an undisclosed fee, agreeing a four-year contract with the club. On 27 December 2020, Ajayi scored his first Premier League goal for Albion in a 1–1 away draw against champions Liverpool.

=== Hull City ===
On 19 June 2025, Ajayi signed for Hull City on a free transfer. He signed a two-year contract with the club holding an option of a further year. He made his debut on 9 August, the opening game of the season, in the 0–0 away draw against Coventry City. He scored his first goal for the club on 29 November in the 2–1 away win against Stoke City. On 22 August 2026, Ajayi scored Hull City's first goal back in the Premier League in the 2–0 home win over Manchester United.

== International career ==
At the end of May 2013, Ajayi was called up to the Nigeria U20 squad for their 2013 Toulon Tournament matches.

After being an unused substitute on Matchday 1 against Mexico U20, Ajayi made his Nigeria U20 debut on 4 June 2013, in a 1–1 draw against Belgium U21. Ajayi went on to make two further appearances in the tournament against Portugal and Brazil. After the tournament ended, Ajayi commented that he was proud to play for the national side.

Ajayi received his first call up to the senior team in August 2018 for 2019 African Cup of Nations Qualifiers, he described it as a "dream" call up. He made his debut against Seychelles in the 2019 Nation cup qualifiers, coming on for the injured Chidozie Awaziem in the 73rd minute.

In December 2023, he was named in the 25-man squad for the 2023 African Cup of Nations in Côte d'Ivoire. He was the only Nigerian player that played every single minute of Nigeria's seven matches as the team went on to emerge runners-up.

On 11 December 2025, Ajayi was called up to the Nigeria squad for the 2025 Africa Cup of Nations.

== Career statistics ==
=== Club ===
As of 22 August 2026

Appearances and goals by club, season and competition
Club	Season	League			FA Cup		League Cup		Other		Total	
Club	Season	Division	Apps	Goals	Apps	Goals	Apps	Goals	Apps	Goals	Apps	Goals
Charlton Athletic	2012–13	Championship	0	0	0	0	0	0	—		0	0
Dartford (loan)	2012–13	Conference National	3	1	0	0	—		1 (Note: Appearance in FA Trophy)	0	4	1
Arsenal	2013–14	Premier League	0	0	0	0	0	0	0	0	0	0
Arsenal	2014–15	Premier League	0	0	0	0	0	0	0	0	0	0
Arsenal	Total		0	0	0	0	0	0	0	0	0	0
Cardiff City (loan)	2014–15	Championship	0	0	—		—		—		0	0
Cardiff City	2015–16	Championship	0	0	0	0	0	0	—		0	0
Cardiff City	2016–17	Championship	0	0	0	0	0	0	—		0	0
Cardiff City	Total		0	0	0	0	0	0	—		0	0
AFC Wimbledon (loan)	2015–16	League Two	5	0	—		—		—		5	0
Crewe Alexandra (loan)	2015–16	League One	13	0	—		—		—		13	0
Rotherham United (loan)	2016–17	Championship	17	1	—		—		—		17	1
Rotherham United	2017–18	League One	35	4	1	0	2	1	4 (Note: One appearance in EFL Trophy, three appearances in League One play-offs)	0	42	5
Rotherham United	2018–19	Championship	46	7	1	0	2	1	—		49	8
Rotherham United	Total		81	11	2	0	4	2	4	0	91	13
West Bromwich Albion	2019–20	Championship	43	5	1	0	1	0	—		45	5
West Bromwich Albion	2020–21	Premier League	33	2	1	1	0	0	—		34	3
West Bromwich Albion	2021–22	Championship	31	1	0	0	0	0	—		31	1
West Bromwich Albion	2022–23	Championship	22	2	3	0	0	0	—		25	2
West Bromwich Albion	2023–24	Championship	26	2	0	0	0	0	1 (Note: Appearance(s) in Championship play-offs)	0	27	2
West Bromwich Albion	2024–25	Championship	15	0	0	0	0	0	—		15	0
West Bromwich Albion	Total		170	12	5	1	1	0	1	0	177	13
Hull City	2025–26	Championship	22	1	0	0	0	0	2	0	24	1
Hull City	2026–27	Premier League	1	1	0	0	0	0	—		1	1
Hull City	Total		23	2	0	0	0	0	2	0	25	2
Career total			312	27	7	1	5	2	8	0	332	30

=== International ===
As of match played 17 November 2026

Appearances and goals by national team and year
National team	Year	Apps	Goals
Nigeria	2018	5	0
Nigeria	2019	6	0
Nigeria	2020	4	0
Nigeria	2021	0	0
Nigeria	2022	6	0
Nigeria	2023	7	1
Nigeria	2024	14	0
Nigeria	2025	8	1
Nigeria	2026	11	0
Total		61	2

Scores and results list Nigeria's goal tally first.

List of international goals scored by Semi Ajayi
No.	Date	Venue	Opponent	Score	Result	Competition
1	18 November 2023	Godswill Akpabio International Stadium, Uyo, Nigeria	Lesotho	1–1	1–1	2026 FIFA World Cup qualification
2	23 December 2025	Fez Stadium, Fez, Morocco	Tanzania	1–0	2–1	2025 Africa Cup of Nations

== Honours ==
Rotherham United

- EFL League One play-offs: 2018

Hull City

- EFL Championship play-offs: 2026

Nigeria

- Africa Cup of Nations runner-up: 2023; third place: 2025

Individual

- EFL Championship Player of the Month: March 2019

Orders

- Member of the Order of the Niger
