= Michael Ihiekwe =

English footballer (born 1992)

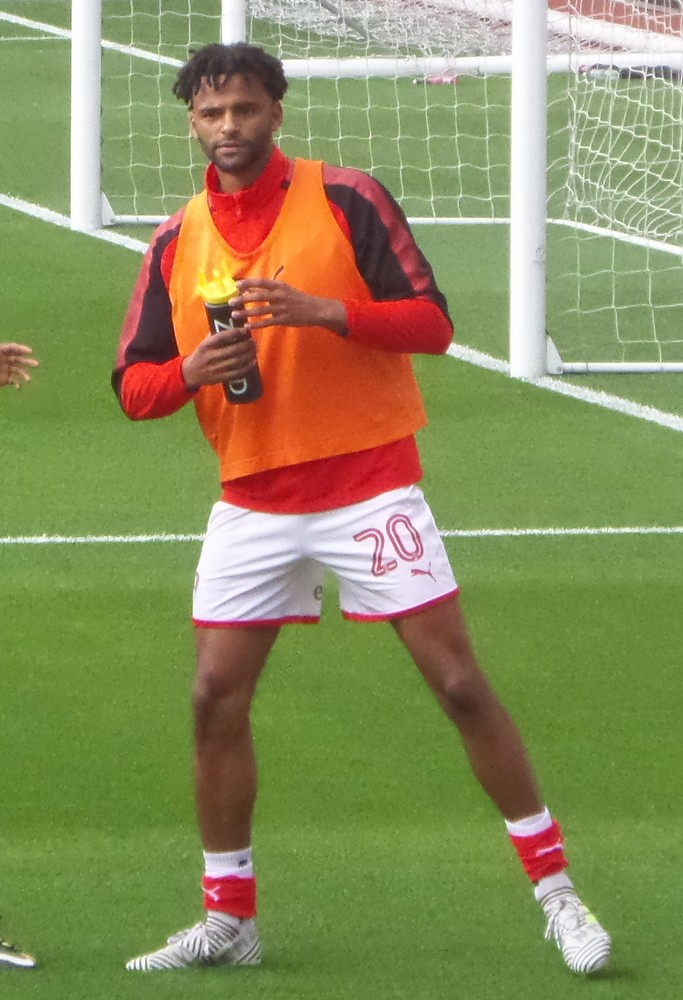
- Ihiekwe in 2017

Personal information
- Full name: Michael Absalom Jude Uzukwu Ihiekwe
- Date of birth: 20 November 1992 (age 33)
- Place of birth: Liverpool, England
- Height: 6 ft 1 in (1.85 m)
- Position: Centre-back

Team information
- Current team: Blackpool
- Number: 20

Youth career
- 2003–2011: Liverpool
- 2011: Wolverhampton Wanderers

Senior career*
Years	Team	Apps	(Gls)
2011–2014	Wolverhampton Wanderers	0	(0)
2014	→ Cheltenham Town (loan)	13	(0)
2014–2017	Tranmere Rovers	112	(5)
2017–2022	Rotherham United	163	(10)
2018–2019	→ Accrington Stanley (loan)	20	(1)
2022–2025	Sheffield Wednesday	68	(3)
2025–	Blackpool	25	(0)
- * Club domestic league appearances and goals as of 22:01, 17 March 2026 (UTC)

Michael Absalom Jude Uzukwu Ihiekwe (born 20 November 1992) is an English professional footballer who plays as a centre-back for EFL League One club Blackpool.

Ihiekwe began his career at Wolverhampton Wanderers and became a professional in March 2011. He spent the second half of the 2013–14 season on loan at Cheltenham Town before he signed with Tranmere Rovers in June 2014. He spent three seasons at the club, making 130 league and cup appearances, with Tranmere being relegated to the National League after his first season there. He returned to the English Football League by signing with Rotherham United in May 2017. He played 184 games in five years at the club, playing in two League One promotion campaigns, 2019–20 and 2021–22, being named on the PFA Team of the Year on both occasions. He also had a three-month loan spell at Accrington Stanley during the 2018–19 campaign and won the EFL Trophy with Rotherham in 2022. He signed with Sheffield Wednesday in June 2022 and was promoted out of the League One play-offs with the club in 2023. He played 82 games for the club, including 48 appearances in the Championship, before he was released at the end of the 2024–25 season.

== Club career ==
=== Wolverhampton Wanderers ===
Ihiekwe grew up in Allerton and was a member of his boyhood club, Liverpool's academy system from the age of ten, before he was released during the 2010–11 season. He played as a forward and then a midfielder before being converted to a defender at age 11. He joined the youth ranks of Wolverhampton Wanderers in January 2011 and captained the Premier League 2 team. He signed a professional contract in March 2011. In May 2012, Ihiekwe signed a contract extension after the club activated a one-year option. He was named in matchday squads during the 2013–14 season. Manager Kenny Jackett told him he was good enough to play for the club but that the form of Richard Stearman and Danny Batth kept him from making his debut.

He joined League Two club Cheltenham Town initially on a month-long loan in January 2014. Ihiekwe then made his senior debut on 25 January in a 1–1 draw at Plymouth Argyle, with his loan at Whaddon Road then being extended to run until the end of the season, during which he made 13 appearances. His contract at Wolves expired in summer 2014. He departed Molineux after not making any appearances for the club.

=== Tranmere Rovers ===
Ihiekwe signed a two-year deal with League Two club Tranmere Rovers on 18 June 2014. Manager Rob Edwards said that "he reads the game well and is a play with lots of potential". Ihiekwe made his debut at Prenton Park on the opening game of the season, a 1–1 draw against York City, where he played 90 minutes. On 1 November, Ihiekwe scored his first goal in professional football, in a 2–2 draw with Stevenage. However, he suffered ankle injury during a match against Cambridge United after a challenge that saw him stretchered off the field. The injury was not serious and he made his return to the first-team weeks later. His return was short-lived as he suffered an injury three weeks later. He regained his first-team place towards the end of the 2014–15 season, playing 46 games in total, but was unable to help manager Micky Adams to avoid relegation to the Conference Premier (to be renamed as the National League).

Ihiekwe adapted well to non-League football, scoring his first goal of the 2015–16 season in a 4–1 win over Gateshead. However, he was soon sidelined for months with a hamstring injury. After making his first-team return in a 1–1 draw against FC Halifax Town on 19 December, Ihiekwe scored his second goal of the season seven days later in a 2–1 win over Macclesfield Town. He retained his first-team place for the whole season, as he made 35 league appearances. Ihiekwe was offered a new contract and signed a one-year contract extension in June.

On 1 October 2016, he received the first red card of his career for a trip in a goalless draw at Dagenham & Redbridge. As the 2016–17 season progressed under new manager Micky Mellon, Ihiekwe began to play in a full-back position, rather than at centre-back as he had played under the management of Gary Brabin. Tranmere ended the season with ten clean sheets in 20 matches as Ihiekwe formed a solid centre-back partnership with Steve McNulty. He scored a brace against Sutton United on 3 April. He played in the 2017 National League play-off final at Wembley Stadium, which ended in a 3–1 defeat to Forest Green Rovers. Despite the defeat, he had impressed Rotherham United manager Paul Warne, who attended the game to scout Christian Doidge. Tranmere offered Ihiekwe a new contract, but he opted to move on after securing an offer from a club in the Football League.

=== Rotherham United ===
On 25 May 2017, League One club Rotherham United announced that Ihiekwe had joined on a two-year contract. He made 35 appearances in the 2017–18 campaign, scoring one goal. Rotherham won the 2018 League One play-off final to secure promotion into the Championship, though Ihiekwe was not in the matchday squad due to injury despite playing in both legs of the semi-final victory over Scunthorpe United; he had scored an own goal for Scunthorpe in the first leg at the New York Stadium.

On 24 August 2018, Ihiekwe joined League Two club Accrington Stanley on loan until 2 January 2019, with manager John Coleman looking to strengthen the Reds defence. He enjoyed his time at the Crown Ground, featuring 23 times as he aimed to impress Rotherham boss Paul Warne. Coleman had hoped to extend the loan. Warne refused as wished to play Ihiekwe himself, though stated that the loan had been "massive" for the player's development. He impressed playing in the Championship for Rotherham in the second half of the 2018–19 season despite it ending in relegation back to League One.

Ihiekwe signed a contract extension in October 2019. He was named on the EFL Team of the Season after the 2019–20 campaign was halted due to the COVID-19 pandemic in England. He was ruled out of action after suffering knee ligament damage in February, though the pandemic meant that he missed only a minimal number of games. He also won the club's Player of the Year award and was named on the PFA Team of the Year for League One, alongside teammate Matt Crooks. Rotherham were promoted back to the Championship in second-place after club's voted to end the season on a points per game basis.

He featured 44 times in the 2020–21 campaign, which ended in relegation back down to League One. He played in the 2022 EFL Trophy final, as Rotherham won the trophy with a 4–2 victory over Sutton United, with Ihiekwe scoring the final goal with a header in extra-time. He rejected talks on a new contract during the 2021–22 campaign as he claimed he did not want negotiations to distract him from the club's push for promotion. He scored five goals in 52 appearances as United secured an automatic promotion place with the division's best defensive record and he was again named on the PFA Team of the Year. He was offered a new contract on improved terms, which he rejected. In total, he made 184 appearances for the Millers, scoring 14 goals and providing 10 assists.

=== Sheffield Wednesday ===
On 22 June 2022, Ihiekwe was announced to be dropping back into League One to join Sheffield Wednesday following the expiration of his Rotherham United contract. He arrived at the club alongside Rotherham teammate Michael Smith, much to Rotherham fan's ire. Manager Darren Moore confirmed that Ihiekwe has sustained knee ligament damage on 3 December and would have an extended stay in the recovery room. He returned to the squad on 10 April against Burton Albion. He went on to play in the 2023 League One play-off final as promotion was secured with a 1–0 extra-time victory over Barnsley. He won 14 aerial duels in the final, belying the fact that it was only his fourth game back after spending much of the 2022–23 season out injured.

Having been sidelined by Xisco Muñoz, who moved the defence into a back four, he was returned to the starting eleven for caretaker manager Neil Thompson's one game in charge on 7 October, a goalless draw with Huddersfield Town. However, he continued to be sidelined for most of the first half of the 2023–24 season before establishing himself as a key member of the defence following a solid performance away at Preston North End. He helped the Owls to escape relegation at the end of the campaign, playing 26 Championship games in all.

He went three-and-a-half months without starting a game before becoming a key performer in the second half of the 2024–25 season, pleasing manager Danny Röhl with his "adaptability and attitude" after being reinstated away at Leeds United. Röhl preferred to play Di'Shon Bernard and Max Lowe at centre-back. Ihiekwe had been strongly linked with a move away from the club during the January transfer window during his lengthy absence from matchday league squads as the club were open to offers. He scored twice in March against Norwich City and Cardiff City, winning the club's Player of the Month award, and was also nominated for the EFL Player of the Month award. He was released from his contract following the end of the 2024–25 season. In total, he made 312 league clearances and won 389 aerial duels for the club, scoring three goals in 83 league and cup appearances.

=== Blackpool ===
Ihiekwe joined Blackpool on 1 July 2025, having signed a three-year contract on 4 June. He made his debut, starting the game in the 2–3 defeat against Stevenage on the opening day of the season.

== International career ==
Ihiekwe was born in England and is of Nigerian descent. In September 2015, Ihiekwe was called up by England C.

== Personal life ==
He was due to marry long-time partner Rosie in 2020, though the wedding was postponed due to the COVID-19 pandemic. The couple have a son, born around the new year in 2019. He has four brothers.

== Career statistics ==
As of 17 March 2026

Appearances and goals by club, season and competition
Club	Season	League			FA Cup		EFL Cup		Other		Total	
Club	Season	Division	Apps	Goals	Apps	Goals	Apps	Goals	Apps	Goals	Apps	Goals
Wolverhampton Wanderers	2013–14	League One	0	0	0	0	0	0	0	0	0	0
Cheltenham Town (loan)	2013–14	League Two	13	0	—		—		—		13	0
Tranmere Rovers	2014–15	League Two	38	1	4	0	1	0	3 (Note: Appearances in Football League Trophy)	0	46	1
Tranmere Rovers	2015–16	National League	35	2	0	0	—		1 (Note: Appearance in FA Trophy)	0	36	2
Tranmere Rovers	2016–17	National League	39	2	0	0	—		9 (Note: Six appearances in FA Trophy, three in National League play-offs)	1	48	3
Tranmere Rovers	Total		112	5	4	0	1	0	13	1	130	6
Rotherham United	2017–18	League One	31	1	1	0	1	0	2 (Note: Appearances in EFL League One play-offs)	0	35	1
Rotherham United	2018–19	Championship	15	2	0	0	0	0	—		15	2
Rotherham United	2019–20	League One	33	2	3	2	2	0	0	0	38	4
Rotherham United	2020–21	Championship	42	2	1	0	1	0	—		44	2
Rotherham United	2021–22	League One	42	3	3	1	1	0	6 (Note: Appearance(s) in EFL Trophy)	1	52	5
Rotherham United	Total		163	10	8	3	5	0	8	1	184	14
Accrington Stanley (loan)	2018–19	League One	20	1	2	0	—		1	0	23	1
Sheffield Wednesday	2022–23	League One	20	0	2	0	3	0	3	0	28	0
Sheffield Wednesday	2023–24	Championship	26	1	2	0	1	0	—		29	1
Sheffield Wednesday	2024–25	Championship	22	2	1	0	2	0	—		25	2
Sheffield Wednesday	Total		68	3	5	0	6	0	3	0	82	3
Blackpool	2025–26	League One	25	0	0	0	1	0	0	0	26	0
Career total			401	19	19	3	13	0	25	2	458	24

== Honours ==
Rotherham United

- EFL League One second-place promotion: 2019–20, 2021–22
- EFL Trophy: 2021–22

Sheffield Wednesday

- EFL League One play-offs: 2023

Individual

- Rotherham United Player of the Year: 2019–20
- PFA Team of the Year: 2019–20 League One, 2021–22 League One
- EFL League One Team of the Year: 2021–22
