= Shaun Cummings =

English Jamaican footballer (born 1989)

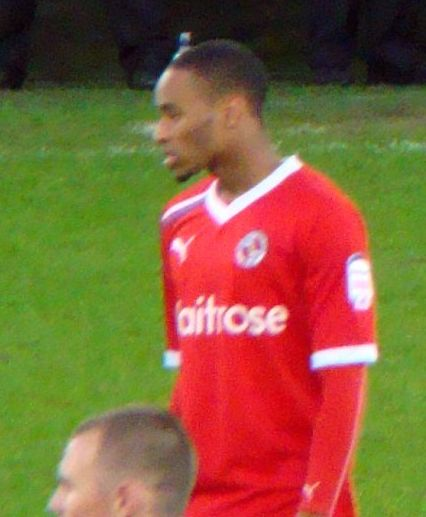
- Cummings playing for Reading in 2012

Personal information
- Full name: Shaun Michael Cummings
- Date of birth: 25 February 1989 (age 37)
- Place of birth: Hammersmith, England
- Height: 6 ft 0 in (1.83 m)
- Position: Right-back

Youth career
- 2002–2007: Chelsea

Senior career*
Years	Team	Apps	(Gls)
2007–2009	Chelsea	0	(0)
2008–2009	→ Milton Keynes Dons (loan)	33	(0)
2009	→ West Bromwich Albion (loan)	3	(0)
2009–2015	Reading	77	(1)
2015–2017	Millwall	44	(1)
2017–2018	Rotherham United	12	(0)
2018–2019	Doncaster Rovers	4	(0)
Total		173	(2)

International career
2013–2015	Jamaica	3	(0)
- * Club domestic league appearances and goals

Shaun Michael Cummings (born 25 February 1989) is a former professional footballer who plays as a right-back. Born in England, Cummings won three caps for Jamaica at international level.

A graduate of the Academy at Chelsea, he spent time on loan at Milton Keynes Dons and West Bromwich Albion, before being sold on to Reading in September 2009. He spent six years at the club, helping them to the Championship title in the 2011–12 season and featuring in nine Premier League games the following campaign. He was sold to Millwall in January 2015 and though limited to 55 games in two and a half seasons he did feature prominently in the 2016–17 FA Cup run that saw Millwall eliminate three top-flight teams. He then spent the 2017–18 season with Rotherham United and two months of the 2018–19 season with Doncaster Rovers.

== Club career ==
=== Chelsea ===
Born in Hammersmith, London, Cummings joined Chelsea's academy as a 12-year-old in 2002 and was the Blues' leading appearance-maker at reserve team level in the 2007–08 season, playing 18 games and scoring once. In August 2008, he joined League One team Milton Keynes Dons on an initial month's loan. He made his senior debut for the Dons on 16 August, in a 1–0 win over Northampton Town at the Stadium MK. The loan was later extended until the end of the 2008–09 season. On 28 October, he was sent off for a foul on Leyton Orient's Sean Thornton. He went on to feature in 35 league and cup games for the Dons.

He joined Championship team West Bromwich Albion on a month's loan on 17 August 2009, with current "Baggies" manager – and former Dons manager – Roberto Di Matteo manager needing cover for injured right-back Gianni Zuiverloon. However he remained at The Hawthorns for just two weeks before signing for Reading on a three-year contract for an undisclosed fee, reuniting with his Academy manager at Chelsea, Brendan Rodgers.

=== Reading ===
Cummings made his debut for the "Royals" on 12 September 2009, in a 0–0 draw with Doncaster Rovers at the Madejski Stadium. However he was unable to hold down a regular starting place, making just seven further appearances under Rodgers. With Reading struggling in the league, Rodgers was sacked in December and under his successor, Brian McDermott, Cummings did not make another appearance for the rest of the 2009–10 season. The 2010–11 season followed a similar pattern for Cummings with Andy Griffin preferred at right-back. He made just 12 appearances during the season, but did play an important role in Reading's 3–0 play-off semi-final second leg win over Cardiff City, filling in on the right-wing and earning plaudits for his performance. He was an unused substitute at Wembley in the play-off final defeat to Swansea City, who were managed by former Reading boss Brendan Rodgers.

Cummings signed a one-year extension to his contract in August 2011, keeping him with the club until June 2013. Despite again starting the season as backup to Griffin, an injury to the experienced defender allowed Cummings into the team and a series of impressive performances saw him cement his place in the side. He made a total of 36 appearances in the 2011–12 campaign during Reading's title-winning season as they returned to the Premier League with the tightest defence in the Championship. With the signing of Chris Gunter in July 2012, Cummings again found himself out of the side for the start of the Premier League season. He returned to the team for the 3–2 League Cup win over Queens Park Rangers and played the next four games before Gunter reclaimed his place in the side. He signed a new two-and-a-half-year contract in December 2012, and a further run of games in December and January followed, before he again dropped out of the side after Stephen Kelly joined during the January transfer window. He did not appear again during the 2012–13 season under McDermott or his successor Nigel Adkins, with his last of eleven appearances coming on 5 January in the 3–1 FA Cup win over Crawley Town. He made a positive start to the 2014–15 season, playing six games in August and scoring his first goal in the 118th-game of his professional career to help secure a 2–2 draw at Wigan Athletic. However he only played 31 minutes for Reading after Steve Clarke took charge in December.

=== Millwall ===
On 12 January 2015, Cummings left Reading for Championship rivals Millwall on an undisclosed deal, signing a two-and-a-half-year contract; manager Ian Holloway said that "as a player he can contribute in defence and in attack" and hoped he would prove to be "a real asset for us over the short and long-term". He played 12 games for the "Lions" as the club suffered relegation at the end of the 2014–15 season. He scored the second goal of his career after his cross was bungled in by goalkeeper Dan Bentley in a 4–0 win at Southend United on 28 December. He played 20 games during the 2015–16 season, but was not in the match day squad for the play-off final defeat to Barnsley as he had been sidelined since February following an operation to repair cartilage damage in his knee.

On 7 January 2017, he scored his third career goal in a 3–0 victory over Premier League side AFC Bournemouth in the FA Cup third round. He also played in the 1–0 victory over Watford in the following round, before scoring the only goal of the game in the fifth round as Millwall knocked out a third consecutive Premier League club at The Den, beating Leicester City with one of the last kicks of the game. The cup run came to an end at White Hart Lane in the quarter-finals, as Millwall were beaten 6–0 by a strong Tottenham Hotspur side. Cummins played a total of 23 games during the 2016–17 season, though missed the play-off final victory over Bradford City after being substituted in the first leg of the semi-final tie with Scunthorpe United. He was offered a new contract by manager Neil Harris in May 2017.

=== Rotherham United ===
Cummings joined Rotherham United on a one-year deal on 9 August 2017, after impressing manager Paul Warne on trial, who hoped he would provide competition for right-back Josh Emmanuel. He struggled to get into the "Millers" first-team, featuring 15 times during the 2017–18 season, and only once after Christmas. He left the New York Stadium after being released by Rotherham at the end of the season.

=== Doncaster Rovers ===
Cummings joined Scunthorpe United on trial in July 2018. On 14 November 2018, Cummings joined Doncaster Rovers on a two-month deal after impressing manager Grant McCann during a trial spell at the Keepmoat Stadium. Assistant manager Cliff Byrne said that his signing would provide cover for the injured Joe Wright. He played only five games during the 2018–19 season.

Cummings joined Port Vale on trial in July 2019.

== International career ==
Despite being born in England, Cummings was provisionally called up to the Jamaica squad in May 2013 for three 2014 World Cup qualifying matches. He made his debut four months later on 6 September, in a 0–0 draw away to Panama. He won a second cap in a 1–1 home draw with Costa Rica on 10 September. He was an alternative player on the provisional squad list for the 2015 CONCACAF Gold Cup, but did not make it into the final 23. His third and final cap came in a 3–0 defeat away to South Korea on 13 October 2015.

== Style of play ==
Cummings is a right-back, though can also play at wing-back and has stated his willingness to play in any outfield position.

== Career statistics ==
=== Club statistics ===
As of 7 July 2019

Appearances and goals by club, season and competition
Club	Season	League			FA Cup		League Cup		Other		Total	
Club	Season	Division	Apps	Goals	Apps	Goals	Apps	Goals	Apps	Goals	Apps	Goals
Chelsea	2008–09	Premier League	0	0	0	0	0	0	0	0	0	0
Milton Keynes Dons (loan)	2008–09	League One	33	0	1	0	1	0	0	0	35	0
West Bromwich Albion (loan)	2009–10	Championship	3	0	0	0	1	0	—		4	0
Reading	2009–10	Championship	8	0	0	0	0	0	—		8	0
Reading	2010–11	Championship	10	0	1	0	0	0	1 (Note: Appearance in the Championship play-offs)	0	12	0
Reading	2011–12	Championship	34	0	1	0	1	0	—		36	0
Reading	2012–13	Premier League	9	0	1	0	1	0	—		11	0
Reading	2013–14	Championship	10	0	0	0	1	0	—		11	0
Reading	2014–15	Championship	5	1	0	0	2	0	0	0	7	1
Reading	Total		77	1	3	0	5	0	1	0	86	0
Millwall	2014–15	Championship	12	0	0	0	—		0	0	12	0
Millwall	2015–16	League One	16	1	1	0	0	0	3 (Note: Appearances in the Football League Trophy)	0	20	1
Millwall	2016–17	League One	16	0	4	2	0	0	3 (Note: Two appearances in the EFL Trophy and one in the League One play-offs)	0	23	2
Millwall	Total		44	1	5	2	0	0	6	0	55	3
Rotherham United	2017–18	League One	12	0	1	0	1	0	1 (Note: Appearance in the EFL Trophy)	0	15	0
Doncaster Rovers	2018–19	League One	4	0	0	0	0	0	1 (Note: Appearance in the EFL Trophy)	0	5	0
Career total			173	2	10	2	8	0	9	0	200	4

=== International statistics ===
Jamaica national team
Year	Apps	Goals
2013	2	0
2014	0	0
2015	1	0
Total	3	0

== Honours ==
Reading

- Football League Championship: 2011–12

Rotherham United

- EFL League One play-offs: 2018
