= Will Vaulks =

Welsh footballer (born 1993)

Personal information
- Full name: William Robert Vaulks
- Date of birth: 13 September 1993 (age 33)
- Place of birth: Wirral, England
- Height: 5 ft 11 in (1.80 m)
- Position: Defensive midfielder

Team information
- Current team: Tranmere Rovers
- Number: 6

Youth career
- –2012: Tranmere Rovers

Senior career*
Years	Team	Apps	(Gls)
2012–2013	Tranmere Rovers	0	(0)
2012–2013	→ Workington (loan)	19	(1)
2013–2016	Falkirk	108	(10)
2016–2019	Rotherham United	125	(13)
2019–2022	Cardiff City	105	(11)
2022–2024	Sheffield Wednesday	77	(2)
2024–2026	Oxford United	83	(2)
2026–	Tranmere Rovers	0	(0)

International career
2019–2022	Wales	7	(0)
- * Club domestic league appearances and goals as of 4 August 2026 (UTC)

William Robert Vaulks (born 13 September 1993) is a professional footballer who plays as a defensive midfielder for EFL League Two club Tranmere Rovers.

He began his professional career at Tranmere Rovers in 2012 but did not make a senior appearance, going on loan to Workington of the Conference North before joining Scottish club Falkirk in February 2013. He played 142 games for the club, including the 2015 Scottish Cup Final and two Scottish Championship play-off finals. In 2016 he joined Rotherham United for an undisclosed fee, where he was Player of the Season as they won the League One playoffs in 2018. In 2019, he signed for Cardiff City. He subsequently played for Sheffield Wednesday and Oxford United before returning to Tranmere Rovers ahead of the 2026–27 season.

In March 2019 he made his debut for the Welsh national team whom he qualifies for through his mother.

== Club career ==
=== Tranmere Rovers ===
Vaulks was born in Wirral, Merseyside, and grew up supporting Newcastle United. He began his career with local League One club Tranmere Rovers, signing amateur forms in March 2003 at the age of nine. Vaulks remained with Tranmere and was rewarded with his first professional contract in June 2010. He was called up for one senior match, a 2–1 extra-time win at Chesterfield in the League Cup first round on 13 August 2012, in which he was an unused substitute.

=== Workington ===
In August 2012, Vaulks joined Workington of the Conference North initially on a one-month loan. He made his senior debut on 22 August in a 1–0 loss to Chester, coming on as a 65th-minute substitute for Mark Boyd. His loan was subsequently extended twice before he signed a permanent deal with Workington at the beginning of December 2012. He went on to make 24 appearances in all competitions for the Cumbrian club, scoring the equaliser in a 2–1 win over Droylsden at Borough Park.

=== Falkirk ===
In February 2013, due to a clause in his Workington contract that allowed him to leave for a professional club, he signed for Scottish Football League First Division side Falkirk. He made his debut on 9 March in a 2–0 loss at Greenock Morton, and ended the season with six appearances.

On 9 November 2013, Vaulks scored his first goal for the Bairns, to open a 4–1 win over Livingston at Falkirk Stadium. In January 2014, Vaulks was called to a trial by English Championship club Blackburn Rovers. He played 42 games over the season, including all four of the play-off games as the club lost 2–1 to Hamilton Academical in the final. He was named in the PFA Scotland Team of the Year for the Scottish Championship in 2013–14. On 10 May 2014, he extended his contract with Falkirk until the end of May 2017.

Vaulks played the full 90 minutes of the 2015 Scottish Cup Final at Hampden Park on 30 May 2015, a 2–1 loss to Inverness Caledonian Thistle. A year later, he played again the play-offs as Falkirk were beaten to a place in the Scottish Premiership by Kilmarnock.

=== Rotherham United ===
On 22 July 2016 Vaulks signed for Rotherham United on a three-year deal for an undisclosed fee. He scored on his Rotherham debut in a 2–2 draw with Wolverhampton Wanderers on 6 August. He played 42 times in all competitions during the 2016–17 season as The Millers were relegated to League One.

Vaulks' goal against Blackpool on the last day of the regular season was his 7th goal in 49 games in all competitions as Rotherham finished the 2017–18 season in fourth place hence qualifying for play-offs. After drawing 2–2 away at Scunthorpe United in the first leg, he scored Rotherham's second in the return fixture as they progressed to the final 4–2 on aggregate. In the final he played the full 120 minutes as The Millers beat Shrewsbury Town to win the 2018 EFL League One play-off final and promotion back to the Championship. At the end of the season Vaulks was given the Rotherham United's Player of the Year award.

On 6 March 2019, Vaulks signed a one-year contract extension. Three days later as captain, he was sent off in the 28th minute of a 2–0 loss at South Yorkshire rivals Sheffield United, for a foul on George Baldock.

=== Cardiff City ===
On 27 June 2019, Vaulks signed for Cardiff City for an undisclosed fee on a three-year deal, in a record sale for Rotherham. He made his debut on 10 August in a 2–1 victory over Luton Town as a second-half substitute in place of Gavin Whyte, and scored his first goal on New Year's Day at the end of a 6–1 loss at Queens Park Rangers.

Vaulks scored twice at home to Brentford on 26 December 2020, but in a 3–2 loss. The following 24 April, after coming on as a last-minute substitute, he was sent off in a 2–1 win over Wycombe Wanderers at the Cardiff City Stadium for a high challenge on Curtis Thompson. On 10 June 2022 Cardiff announced Vaulks would leave the club when his contract expires on 30 June.

=== Sheffield Wednesday ===
On 21 June 2022, Vaulks joined Sheffield Wednesday following the expiration of his Cardiff City contract. He made his Wednesday debut against Portsmouth on 30 July as a substitute for Fisayo Dele-Bashiru. On 1 October he scored his first goal for the club as the only goal of the game away to Port Vale. On 26 March 2024, Vaulks was awarded the EFL Championship Player in the Community for the third time. Will Vaulks won the clubs 2023–24 Player of the Season Award after being a vital cog in the midfield. Following the end of the 2023–24 season, the club had offered Vaulks a new contract.

=== Oxford United ===
On 11 June 2024, it was confirmed Vaulks would join Oxford United on 1 July 2024. He made his debut against Norwich City on 10 August, starting the game in a 2–0 win. On 14 January 2025, he scored his first goal for the club in a 1–1 league draw away against Plymouth Argyle.

=== Tranmere Rovers ===
On 3 August 2026, Vaulks signed a two-year contract with hometown club Tranmere Rovers, returning to the club where he started his youth career in football. On 14 August, the eve of the beginning of the league season, he was named captain by manager Darrell Clarke.

== International career ==
Vaulks qualifies to play for Wales through his mother, and in March 2019 manager Ryan Giggs called him up to the national team for games against Slovakia and Trinidad and Tobago. He made his debut in the friendly against the latter team at the Racecourse Ground in Wrexham on 20 March, playing the full match and assisting the only goal by Ben Woodburn in added time. He made his competitive debut on 8 June that year in a 2–1 defeat to Croatia.

== Personal life ==
Vaulks lost both of his grandfathers to suicide when he was a teenager. He has raised awareness for the suicide bereavement charity Baton of Hope.

== Career statistics ==
=== Club ===
As of end of 2025–26 season

Appearances and goals by club, season and competition
Club	Season	League			National cup (Note: Includes Scottish Cup, FA Cup)		League cup (Note: Includes Scottish League Cup, EFL Cup)		Other		Total	
Club	Season	Division	Apps	Goals	Apps	Goals	Apps	Goals	Apps	Goals	Apps	Goals
Tranmere Rovers	2012–13	League One	0	0	—		0	0	0	0	0	0
Workington (loan)	2012–13	Conference North	19	1	5	1	—		0	0	24	1
Falkirk	2012–13	Scottish First Division	6	0	0	0	—		—		6	0
Falkirk	2013–14	Scottish Championship	33	1	1	0	3	0	7 (Note: Three appearances in Scottish Challenge Cup, four in play-offs)	0	44	1
Falkirk	2014–15	Scottish Championship	34	3	5	0	3	0	3 (Note: Appearances in Scottish Challenge Cup)	1	45	4
Falkirk	2015–16	Scottish Championship	35	6	2	1	3	0	6 (Note: Two appearances in Scottish Challenge Cup, four appearances and one goal in play-offs)	1	46	8
Falkirk	2016–17	Scottish Championship	0	0	—		1	1	—		1	1
Falkirk	Total		108	10	8	1	10	1	16	2	142	14
Rotherham United	2016–17	Championship	40	1	1	0	1	0	—		42	1
Rotherham United	2017–18	League One	44	5	1	1	2	0	5 (Note: Two appearances and one goal in the EFL Trophy, three appearances and one goal in League One play-offs)	2	52	8
Rotherham United	2018–19	Championship	41	7	1	0	1	1	—		42	8
Rotherham United	Total		125	13	3	1	4	1	5	2	137	17
Cardiff City	2019–20	Championship	27	4	4	0	1	0	2 (Note: Appearances in Championship play-offs)	0	34	4
Cardiff City	2020–21	Championship	42	5	1	0	0	0	—		43	5
Cardiff City	2021–22	Championship	36	2	2	0	2	0	—		40	2
Cardiff City	Total		105	11	7	0	3	0	2	0	117	11
Sheffield Wednesday	2022–23	League One	43	2	4	0	2	0	5 (Note: Two appearances in EFL Trophy, three appearance in League One play-offs)	0	54	2
Sheffield Wednesday	2023–24	Championship	34	0	1	0	2	0	—		37	0
Sheffield Wednesday	Total		77	2	5	0	4	0	5	0	91	2
Oxford United	2024–25	Championship	44	1	0	0	2	0	—		46	1
Oxford United	2025–26	Championship	39	1	2	0	1	0	—		42	1
Oxford United	Total		83	2	2	0	3	0	—		88	2
Tranmere Rovers	2026–27	League Two	0	0	0	0	—		0	0	0	0
Career total			517	38	30	3	24	2	28	4	599	47

=== International ===
As of match played 29 March 2022

Appearances and goals by national team and year
National team	Year	Apps	Goals
Wales	2019	5	0
Wales	2020	1	0
Wales	2022	1	0
Total		7	0

== Honours ==
Falkirk

- Stirlingshire Cup: 2013–14
- Scottish Cup runner-up: 2014–15

Rotherham United

- EFL League One play-offs: 2018

Sheffield Wednesday

- EFL League One play-offs: 2023

Individual

- PFA Scotland Team of the Year: 2013–14 Scottish Championship
- Rotherham United Goal of the Season: 2016–17
- Rotherham United Player of the Season: 2017–18
- Sheffield Wednesday Player of the Season: 2023–24
