= Robert Jones (referee) =

English football referee (born 1987)

Rob Jones
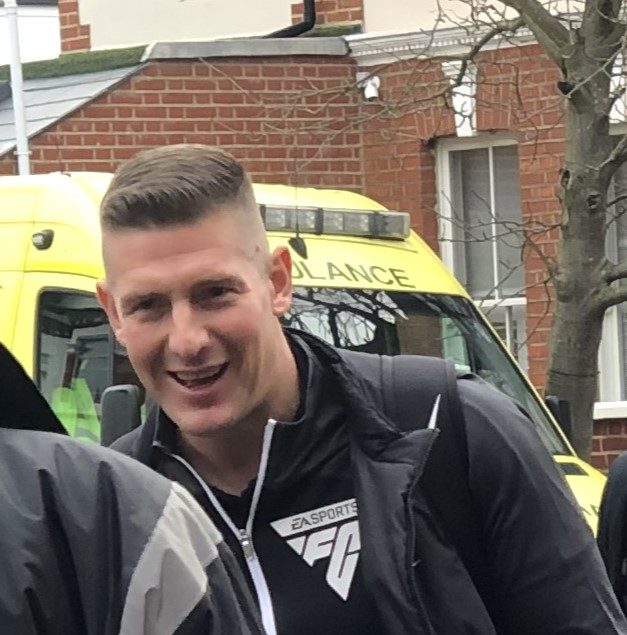
- Jones in 2024
- Full name: Robert Jones
- Born: 4 April 1987 (age 39); Merseyside, England

Domestic
Years	League	Role
2016–	English Football League	Referee
2019–	Premier League	Referee

International
Years	League	Role
2023–	FIFA listed	Referee

Robert Jones (born 4 April 1987) is an English football referee. He has refereed in the English Football League since 2016 and the Premier League since 2019. He was the referee for the 2016 National League play-off final, the 2018 EFL League One play-off final and the 2020 EFL League One play-off final.

== Biography ==
Born on 4 April 1987 in Merseyside, Jones began refereeing at age 14, as his uncle had been a referee. He is a member of the Cheshire Football Association and the Wirral Referees' Association. As the Metropolitan Borough of Wirral is part of Merseyside, Jones is not permitted to referee matches involving Liverpool or Everton.

Jones spent two seasons refereeing in the fifth-tier National League. On 15 May 2016, he officiated in the 2016 National League play-off final between Grimsby Town and Forest Green Rovers.

From the 2016–17 season, Jones officiated in the English Football League. He was selected for the 2018 EFL League One play-off final, between Rotherham United and Shrewsbury Town. The latter club's manager, Paul Hurst, criticised the selection as Jones had sent off Shrewsbury captain Abu Ogogo in an earlier match between the two teams.

=== Premier League ===
Jones made his Premier League debut on 21 December 2019 in a game between Brighton & Hove Albion and Sheffield United. He awarded United's John Egan an early goal that was disallowed by the video assistant referee (VAR) in a 1–0 Sheffield United win. He was the fourth official in 15 other top-flight fixtures that season and was promoted to Select Group 1 at its conclusion. He also officiated in the 2020 EFL League One play-off final between Oxford United and Wycombe Wanderers.

On 27 December 2020, in his third top-flight game of the season and fourth overall, Jones officiated in Leeds United's 1–0 home win over Burnley. He awarded a penalty kick from which Patrick Bamford scored the only goal after five minutes, though goalkeeper Nick Pope appeared to have touched the ball while tackling Bamford. He disallowed a potential equaliser from Ashley Barnes due to a foul by Ben Mee on Leeds goalkeeper Illan Meslier, which was regarded by Sky Sports commentator Andy Hinchcliffe as in fact a foul by Meslier. Keith Hackett, former chief of Professional Game Match Officials Limited (PGMOL) wrote in The Daily Telegraph that Jones made two errors that he should not have with his experience, and that he was not sprinting enough to keep a view on Leeds, a team who played a fast style of football.

Jones was promoted to the FIFA list in 2023.

Jones was on VAR duty on 26 August 2023 as Nottingham Forest lost 3–2 away to Manchester United after leading 2–0 in the fourth minute. He supported referee Stuart Attwell in two controversial calls against Forest: the dismissal of Joe Worrall for a foul on Bruno Fernandes as the last man between Fernandes and the goal, even though Willy Boly appeared be in that position, and the match-winning late penalty scored by Fernandes after Danilo was judged to have fouled Marcus Rashford. Forest manager Steve Cooper said he was surprised by how quickly the decisions were reached, and the club launched a formal complaint against PGMOL. Despite the complaint, he was put in charge of Forest's match against Burnley on 18 September and was involved in another VAR controversy, this time in Forest's favour; he disallowed a potential winner for Burnley in a 1–1 draw as VAR official Darren England believed Sander Berge had committed handball; no Forest player had appealed the goal.

In the North London derby between Arsenal and Tottenham Hotspur on 24 September 2023, Jones awarded Arsenal a penalty when a close-range shot from Ben White struck the hand of Cristian Romero. He had initially given no penalty, but reversed his decision upon checking the VAR monitor. Television pundit and former Forest and Tottenham player Jermaine Jenas wrote on Twitter that Jones was a "complete shithouse" and that all referees were ruining football, for which he apologised when challenged by a refereeing charity.

On 23 December 2023, Jones refereed Forest's 3–2 home loss to AFC Bournemouth. He sent off Boly in the first half-hour for a second yellow card when the defender had won the ball fairly from Adam Smith. The call was described by Sky Sports's live commentary as "one of the worst decisions this season". The decision could not go to VAR review as it concerned a second yellow card, not a straight red. Forest manager Nuno Espírito Santo also criticised Jones for not awarding his club a penalty for handball after a VAR review: "I have seen it many times and I cannot understand it. I cannot understand it. It was bad". Forest wrote to Howard Webb, chief of PGMOL, requesting that Jones be suspended from their matches.

On 14 January 2025, in a game between Chelsea and Bournemouth, Jones was called to the VAR monitor to review a possible red card for an incident in which David Brooks had grabbed at Marc Cucurella, out of sight of the referee. Jones became the first referee to overrule such a decision, instead issuing Brooks with a yellow card.

In the Premier League match between Chelsea and Fulham on 30 August 2025, Jones erroneously disallowed what appeared to be a goal from Fulham's Josh King in the 21st minute after reviewing the incident on the VAR monitor. Upon review, he concluded that Rodrigo Muniz had committed a "careless challenge" by stepping on the foot of Chelsea defender Trevoh Chalobah, and therefore ruled the goal invalid, restarting play with a Chelsea free kick. The decision was widely condemned by pundits including Stuart Pearce, Jamie Carragher and Rio Ferdinand. The PGMOL acknowledged that VAR made a mistake in intervening in Fulham's goal and that Rob Jones had made an error. Michael Salisbury, the VAR at Stamford Bridge that day, was stood down from his involvement. Rob Jones faced no punishment.
