= Darnelle Bailey-King =

English footballer (born 1997)

Personal information
- Full name: Darnelle Feyon J. S. Bailey-King
- Date of birth: 17 October 1997 (age 29)
- Place of birth: Lambeth, England
- Height: 1.75 m (5 ft 9 in)
- Position: Midfielder

Team information
- Current team: Faversham Town

Youth career
- Fulham
- –2015: Rotherham United

Senior career*
Years	Team	Apps	(Gls)
2015–2018	Rotherham United	2	(0)
2016–2017	→ Gainsborough Trinity (loan)	20	(1)
2017	→ Matlock Town (loan)	7	(0)
2017	→ North Ferriby United (loan)	6	(1)
2021	East Grinstead Town	1	(0)
2022–2023	Fisher	24	(2)
2023	→ VCD Athletic (dual-registration)	5	(0)
2023	East Grinstead Town	8	(0)
2023–2024	Fisher	9	(0)
2024–	Faversham Town	0	(0)
- * Club domestic league appearances and goals as of 14:24, 16 March 2024 (UTC)

Darnelle Bailey-King (born 17 October 1997) is an English footballer who plays as a midfielder for Faversham Town.

He played professionally for Rotherham United, whilst also spending time on loan with Gainsborough Trinity, Matlock Town and North Ferriby United.

== Career ==
Bailey-King made his professional debut for Rotherham United on 7 May 2016 against Hull City in the Football League Championship coming on as an 84th-minute substitute.

On 20 August 2016 it was announced that Bailey-King had joined National League North side Gainsborough Trinity on a months loan. The loan was subsequently extended to the end of the season.

In September 2017 Bailey-King joined National League North side North Ferriby United on a months loan. This was then extended for a further month.

He was released by Rotherham at the end of the 2017–18 season.

== Statistics ==
As of 8 November 2017.

Appearances and goals by club, season and competition
Club	Season	League			FA Cup		League Cup		Other (Note: Includes other competitive competitions, including the Football League Trophy)		Total	
Club	Season	Division	Apps	Goals	Apps	Goals	Apps	Goals	Apps	Goals	Apps	Goals
Rotherham United	2015–16	Championship	1	0	0	0	0	0	0	0	1	0
Rotherham United	2016–17	Championship	1	0	0	0	0	0	0	0	1	0
Rotherham United	Total		2	0	0	0	0	0	0	0	2	0
Gainsborough Trinity (loan)	2016–17	National League North	20	1	0	0	0	0	0	0	20	1
Matlock Town (loan)	2017–18	NPL Premier	7	0	0	0	0	0	1	0	8	0
North Ferriby United (loan)	2017–18	National League North	6	1	0	0	0	0	0	0	6	1
Career total			35	2	0	0	0	0	1	0	36	2
