= Mason Warren =

English footballer (born 1997)

Personal information
- Full name: Mason Rhys Warren
- Date of birth: 28 March 1997 (age 29)
- Place of birth: Doncaster, England
- Height: 5 ft 8 in (1.73 m)
- Positions: Left back; midfielder

Team information
- Current team: Mickleover Sports

Youth career
- –2015: Rotherham United

Senior career*
Years	Team	Apps	(Gls)
2015–2018	Rotherham United	0	(0)
2015–2016	→ Sheffield (loan)	6	(0)
2016	→ Harrogate Town (loan)	11	(0)
2016	→ Grantham Town (loan)	1	(0)
2016–2017	→ Matlock Town (loan)	2	(0)
2017	→ Boston United (loan)	4	(1)
2017	→ North Ferriby (loan)	8	(0)
2017–2018	→ Gainsborough Trinity (loan)	2	(0)
2018–2023	Mickleover Sports		
- * Club domestic league appearances and goals as of 20:08, 2 September 2018 (UTC)

Mason Rhys Warren (born 28 March 1997) is an English footballer who plays as a midfielder for Mickleover Sports. He played professionally for Rotherham United in 2016.

== Club career ==
Warren was born in Doncaster, South Yorkshire and started his career with Rotherham United, where he progressed from the youth team to sign a professional contract in May 2015. He was taken with the first team on the pre-season tour of Scotland and became a regular with the development squad before he was sent to NPL Division One South side Sheffield on a two-month youth loan deal. He was a prominent figure in the side making six appearances during his loan spell before he was recalled in early January 2016. In February 2016, he was loaned out again joining National League North side Harrogate Town on a one-month loan deal. After picking up the Player of the Month award for Harrogate during February, his loan was extended until April. He went on to make a total of eleven appearances for Town. Upon his return to Rotherham in April, he signed a new two-year contract extension until 2018.

In August 2016, he made his first team debut for Rotherham in the EFL Cup first round 5–4 defeat to Morecambe, completing the full ninety minutes. In October he was sent out on loan to NPL Premier Division side Grantham Town on a one-month loan deal. He only made one appearance for the club in a 1–0 win over Mickleover Sports. In December 2016 he was sent to NPL Premier Division side Matlock Town on a one-month youth loan. He only made two appearances for Matlock before returning to Rotherham in mid-January. In December 2017 Warren joined Gainsborough Trinity on a youth loan.

He was released by Rotherham at the end of the 2017–18 season, subsequently signing in August 2018 for Mickleover Sports, where he made his debut on 22 August at Gainsborough Trinity.

== Career statistics ==
As of match played 6 January 2018

Appearances and goals by club, season and competition
Club	Season	League			FA Cup		League Cup		Other		Total	
Club	Season	Division	Apps	Goals	Apps	Goals	Apps	Goals	Apps	Goals	Apps	Goals
Rotherham United	2015–16	Championship	0	0	0	0	0	0	—		0	0
Rotherham United	2016–17	Championship	0	0	0	0	1	0	—		1	0
Rotherham United	Total		0	0	0	0	1	0	—		1	0
Sheffield (loan)	2015–16	NPL Division One South	6	0	—		—		—		6	0
Harrogate Town (loan)	2015–16	National League North	11	0	—		—		—		11	0
Grantham Town (loan)	2016–17	NPL Premier Division	1	0	—		—		0	0	1	0
Matlock Town (loan)	2016–17	NPL Premier Division	2	0	—		—		0	0	2	0
Boston United (loan)	2017–18	National League North	4	1	—		—		—		4	1
North Ferriby United (loan)	2017–18	National League North	8	0	—		—		—		8	0
Gainsborough Trinity (loan)	2017–18	National League North	2	0	—		—		—		2	0
Career total			34	1	0	0	1	0	0	0	35	1
