= Anthony Forde (footballer) =

Irish footballer (born 1993)

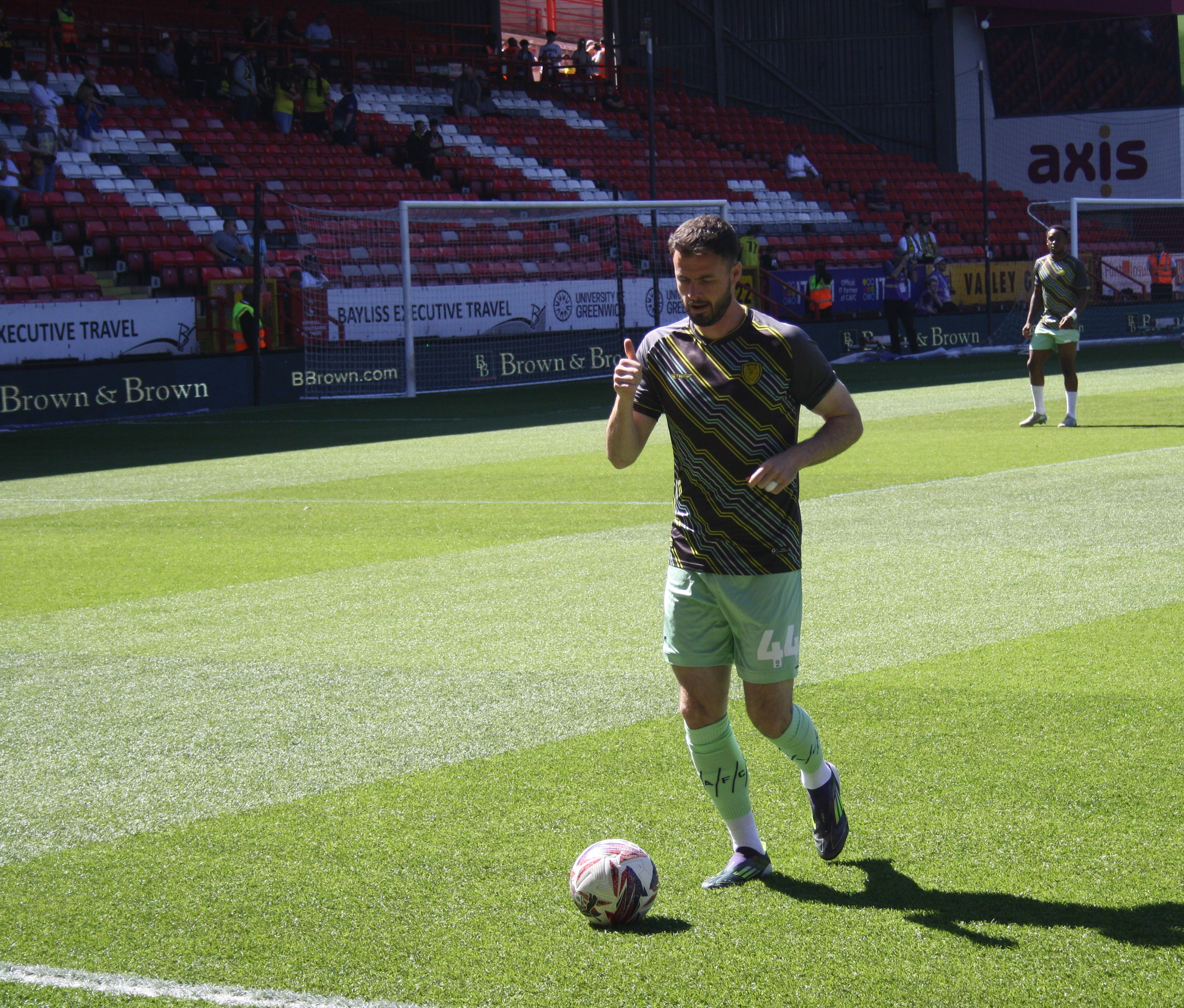
- Forde training for Burton Albion in 2025.

Personal information
- Full name: Anthony Michael Forde
- Date of birth: 16 November 1993 (age 32)
- Place of birth: Ballingarry, Ireland
- Height: 5 ft 11 in (1.80 m)
- Position: Wing-back

Team information
- Current team: Altrincham

Youth career
- 1998–2006: Ballingarry
- 2006–2008: Kingdom Boys
- 2009–2011: Wolverhampton Wanderers

Senior career*
Years	Team	Apps	(Gls)
2011–2014	Wolverhampton Wanderers	21	(0)
2013	→ Scunthorpe United (loan)	8	(0)
2014–2016	Walsall	78	(7)
2016–2019	Rotherham United	101	(5)
2019–2022	Oxford United	66	(3)
2022–2025	Wrexham	45	(4)
2025	Burton Albion	11	(0)
2026–	Altrincham	0	(0)

International career
2011–2013	Republic of Ireland U19	13	(2)
2012–2014	Republic of Ireland U21	11	(2)
- * Club domestic league appearances and goals as of 20:13, 2 February 2024 (UTC)

Anthony Michael Forde (born 16 November 1993) is an Irish professional footballer who plays as a wing-back for at Altrincham. He has represented the Republic of Ireland at numerous youth levels.

== Career ==
=== Wolves ===
Forde moved to Wolves in summer 2009 to become part of their academy group. He made his senior debut on 23 August 2011 as a substitute in a League Cup tie against Northampton Town, and his Premier League debut on 26 November 2011 at Chelsea. He made six appearances in the top flight as the club suffered relegation.

Having signed a contract to last until summer 2015, the winger started the first two games of new Wolves' manager Ståle Solbakken but gradually faded from the first team as the season progressed. In March 2013 he moved on loan to League One side Scunthorpe United for the remainder of the 2012–13 season.

During the 2013–14 season, Forde made only five appearances (four as substitute) as Wolves won promotion back to the Championship at the first attempt.

=== Walsall ===
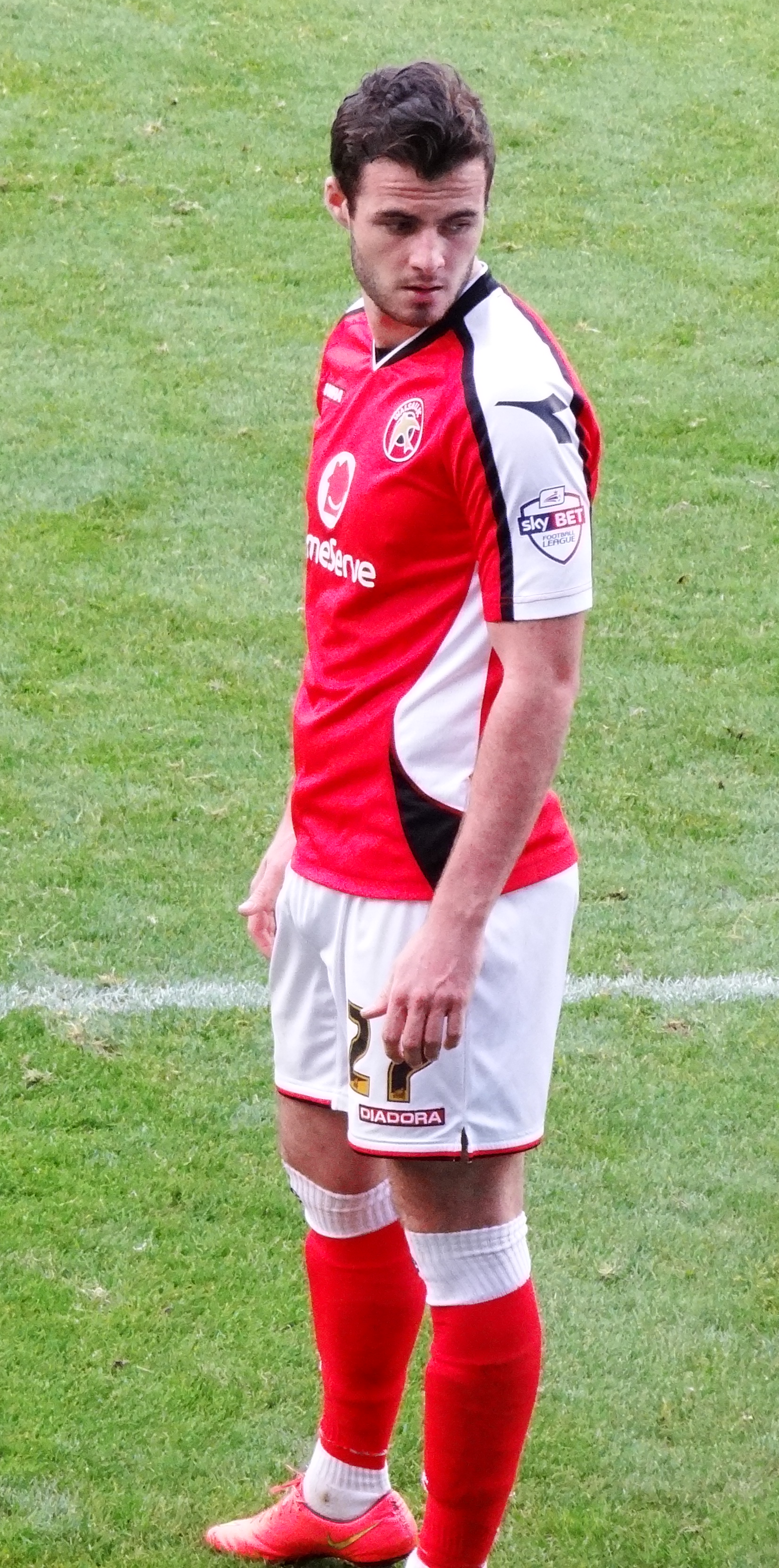
Forde playing for Walsall in 2014.

On 12 August 2014, Forde joined Wolves' Midlands neighbours Walsall of League One, signing a two-year deal for an undisclosed fee. He scored his first goal for the club in a 3–0 victory over Doncaster Rovers on 27 September 2014. Forde scored a free kick in the Saddlers' 2–0 victory over Preston North End in the first leg of the Football League Trophy Northern area final on 7 January 2015. He scored his second league goal of the season on 17 January 2015 in a 2–0 win over Colchester.

=== Rotherham United ===
On 30 June 2016, it was announced that Forde had opted to join Rotherham United on a three-year deal for an undisclosed fee. He scored his first goal for Rotherham in a 5–4 EFL Cup loss against Morecambe on 9 August 2016. He left the club at the end of his contract in June 2019.

=== Oxford United ===
On 31 July 2019, Forde signed a two-year deal with Oxford United. He made his debut in a League One victory over Peterborough United on 10 August 2019 and scored his first goal in a 4–2 defeat to Burton Albion ten days later.

=== Wrexham ===
On 28 July 2022, Forde signed a two-year deal with Wrexham.

On 20 February 2025, Forde joined League One side Burton Albion on a deal until the end of the season after being released by Wrexham.

On 13 May 2025 Burton said the player would leave in June when his contract expired.

On 13 January 2026, Forde signed for National League side Altrincham.

== Career statistics ==
As of match played 10 December 2024

Appearances and goals by club, season and competition
Club	Season	League			FA Cup		League Cup		Other		Total	
Club	Season	Division	Apps	Goals	Apps	Goals	Apps	Goals	Apps	Goals	Apps	Goals
Wolverhampton Wanderers	2011–12	Premier League	6	0	0	0	1	0	0	0	7	0
Wolverhampton Wanderers	2012–13	Championship	12	0	1	0	3	0	0	0	16	0
Wolverhampton Wanderers	2013–14	League One	3	0	0	0	1	0	1 (Note: Appearances in the Football League Trophy)	0	5	0
Wolverhampton Wanderers	Total		21	0	1	0	5	0	1	0	28	0
Scunthorpe United (loan)	2012–13	League One	8	0	0	0	0	0	0	0	8	0
Walsall	2014–15	League One	37	3	2	0	1	0	6	2	46	5
Walsall	2015–16	League One	41	4	5	1	2	0	3 (Note: One appearance in the Football League Trophy and two in the League One play-offs)	0	51	5
Walsall	Total		78	7	7	1	3	0	9 (Note: Soccerbase has 10 total, but only 9 are counted on season pages)	2	97	10
Rotherham United	2016–17	Championship	32	2	1	0	1	1	0	0	34	3
Rotherham United	2017–18	League One	41	2	0	0	2	1	6 (Note: Three appearances in the Football League Trophy and three appearances in the League One play-offs)	0	49	3
Rotherham United	2018–19	Championship	28	1	1	0	2	0	0	0	31	1
Rotherham United	Total		101	5	2	0	5	2	6	0	114	7
Oxford United	2019–20	League One	18	1	2	0	4	0	6	1	30	2
Oxford United	2020–21	League One	35	1	1	0	2	0	7 (Note: Five appearances in the Football League Trophy and two appearances in the League One play-offs)	0	45	1
Oxford United	2021–22	League One	13	1	2	0	1	0	2	0	18	1
Oxford United	Total		66	3	5	0	7	0	15	1	93	4
Wrexham	2022–23	National League	31	3	7	0	0	0	1	0	39	3
Wrexham	2023–24	League Two	14	1	2	0	1	0	1	0	18	1
Wrexham	2024–25	League One	0	0	0	0	0	0	4	0	4	0
Wrexham	Total		45	4	9	0	1	0	6	0	61	4
Career Total			319	19	24	1	21	2	37	3	401	25

== Personal life ==
Forde and his partner, Laura Mangan, have a son, Paddy, who was born in 2023. Forde went on a six-week hiatus from Wrexham in 2023 when his older brother Kevin was diagnosed with leukemia and Mangan was diagnosed with a malignant brain tumor; on the recommendation of Wrexham chairman Ryan Reynolds, the couple got a second opinion on the tumor which turned out to be benign. Forde's absence from the club at the time wasn't publicised, and was only referred to as "personal problems" in the press; it wasn't until the release of the docuseries Welcome to Wrexham that the couple revealed their ordeal to the general public.

== Honours ==
Walsall

- Football League Trophy runner-up: 2014–15

Rotherham United

- EFL League One play-offs: 2018

Wrexham

- National League: 2022–23
- EFL League Two runner-up: 2023–24
