= Marek Rodák =

Slovak footballer (born 1996)

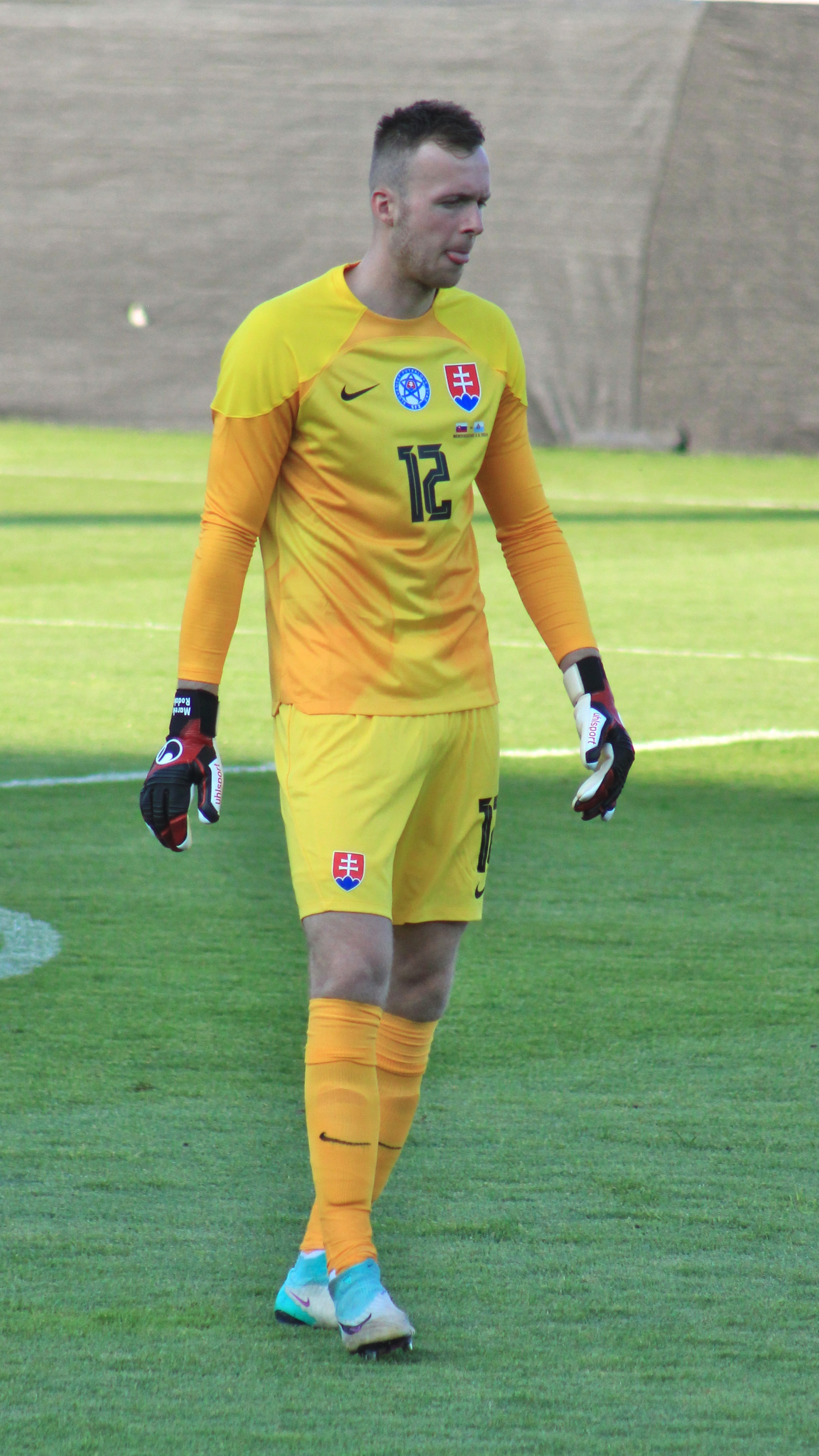
- Rodák with Slovakia in 2024

Personal information
- Full name: Marek Rodák
- Date of birth: 13 December 1996 (age 29)
- Place of birth: Košice, Slovakia
- Height: 1.94 m (6 ft 4 in)
- Position: Goalkeeper

Team information
- Current team: Al-Ettifaq
- Number: 1

Youth career
- MFK Košice
- 2013–2014: Fulham

Senior career*
Years	Team	Apps	(Gls)
2014–2024	Fulham	70	(0)
2014–2015	→ Farnborough (loan)	5	(0)
2015–2016	→ Welling United (loan)	17	(0)
2017	→ Accrington Stanley (loan)	20	(0)
2017–2019	→ Rotherham United (loan)	80	(0)
2024–	Al-Ettifaq	72	(0)

International career^{‡}
2013	Slovakia U17	0	(0)
2013–2015	Slovakia U19	8	(0)
2015–2018	Slovakia U21	14	(1)
2020–	Slovakia	27	(0)
- * Club domestic league appearances and goals as of 30 October 2026 ‡ National team caps and goals as of 17:24, 18 November 2026 (UTC)

Marek Rodák (born 13 December 1996) is a Slovak professional footballer who plays as a goalkeeper for Saudi Pro League club Al-Ettifaq and the Slovakia national team.

== Club career ==
Rodák began his career in his homeland with MFK Košice before being offered a trial with Fulham in 2013. He was signed permanently by the Fulham Academy in July 2013 at the age of 16. Despite his young age, he became part of the Under-18 side and played in the 2014 Final of the FA Youth Cup against Chelsea.

A short two-month loan to Farnborough in January 2015 was followed by a progression to Fulham's Under-21 side. On 15 January 2016, he joined Welling United on loan for the remainder of the season. Rodák joined Accrington Stanley on loan from Fulham until the end of the 2016–17 season in January 2017. He made his English Football League debut on 14 January 2017 against Cheltenham Town at Whaddon Road. Rodák had a significant role in Accrington Stanley's move from the relegation zone to a comfortably mid-table position, courtesy of a 13 match unbeaten run.

Rodák made his Fulham debut in a League Cup tie against Wycombe Wanderers on 8 August 2017. Later that month Rodak joined Rotherham United on loan for the rest of the season and made his debut in a 3–2 win at home to Bury. He then re-joined the club for a further season-long loan on 25 July 2018.

Rodák made his Premier League debut on 12 September 2020 in a 0–3 loss to Arsenal in the first round of 2020–21 season. He then spent the rest of the season as a backup for Alphonse Areola and made only one additional league appearance in 0–2 loss to Newcastle United on the last day of the season.

Rodák made his 2022-23 Premier League debut on 6 August 2022, playing the entire 2–2 home draw against Liverpool., but was demoted to second-choice goalkeeper following the arrival of Bernd Leno from Arsenal.

On 5 June 2024, Fulham announced that Rodák would leave the club following the expiration of his contract, ending his ten-year spell at the club.

On 25 July 2024, Rodák joined Saudi Pro League club Al-Ettifaq on a three-year deal.

== International career ==
Rodák was called up to the Slovakia senior team in June 2018, but did not appear.

In September 2018, Rodák scored a 94th minute winner for Slovakia U21s in a crucial 2019 European Under-21 Championship qualifying game against Iceland U21s. This wasn't his first goal scored at under-21 level, having previously scored for Fulham against Aston Villa in the U21s Premier League in 2014.

On 7 September 2020, Rodák made his senior team debut in a UEFA Nations League match against Israel, which ended in 1–1 draw. He went on to start in another four matches in 2020, including two Euro 2020 qualification play-off matches. He made a save in the penalty shootout against Ireland on 8 October 2020, and helped the team to secure 2–1 win after extra time against Northern Ireland on 12 November 2020, which qualified Slovakia for Euro 2020.

Rodák was called up to the Slovakia squad for the UEFA Euro 2024 tournament.

== Career statistics ==
=== Club ===
As of match played 21 May 2026

Appearances and goals by club, season and competition
Club	Season	League			FA Cup		League Cup		Other		Total	
Club	Season	Division	Apps	Goals	Apps	Goals	Apps	Goals	Apps	Goals	Apps	Goals
Fulham	2017–18	Championship	0	0	0	0	1	0	0	0	1	0
Fulham	2019–20	Championship	33	0	2	0	1	0	3 (Note: Appearances in Championship play-offs)	0	39	0
Fulham	2020–21	Premier League	2	0	2	0	2	0	—		6	0
Fulham	2021–22	Championship	33	0	0	0	2	0	—		35	0
Fulham	2022–23	Premier League	2	0	3	0	1	0	—		6	0
Fulham	2023–24	Premier League	0	0	2	0	3	0	—		5	0
Fulham	Total		70	0	9	0	10	0	3	0	102	0
Farnborough (loan)	2014–15	Conference South	5	0	0	0	—		1 (Note: Appearance in FA Trophy)	0	6	0
Welling United (loan)	2015–16	National League	17	0	0	0	—		1	0	18	0
Accrington Stanley (loan)	2016–17	League Two	20	0	1	0	0	0	0	0	21	0
Rotherham United (loan)	2017–18	League One	35	0	0	0	—		3 (Note: Appearances in League One play-offs)	0	38	0
Rotherham United (loan)	2018–19	Championship	45	0	1	0	—		0	0	46	0
Rotherham United (loan)	Total		80	0	1	0	0	0	3	0	84	0
Al-Ettifaq	2024–25	Saudi Pro League	34	0	2	0	—		—		36	0
Al-Ettifaq	2025–26	Saudi Pro League	34	0	1	0	—		—		35	0
Al-Ettifaq	Total		68	0	3	0	—		—		71	0
Career total			260	0	13	0	10	0	8	0	291	0

=== International ===
As of match played 17 November 2026

Appearances and goals by national team and year
National team	Year	Apps	Goals
Slovakia	2020	5	0
Slovakia	2021	7	0
Slovakia	2022	7	0
Slovakia	2023	1	0
Slovakia	2024	4	0
Slovakia	2025	1	0
Slovakia	2026	2	0
Total		27	0

== Honours ==
Rotherham United

- EFL League One play-offs: 2018

Fulham

- EFL Championship: 2021–22; play-offs: 2020
