= Josh Emmanuel =

English association football player

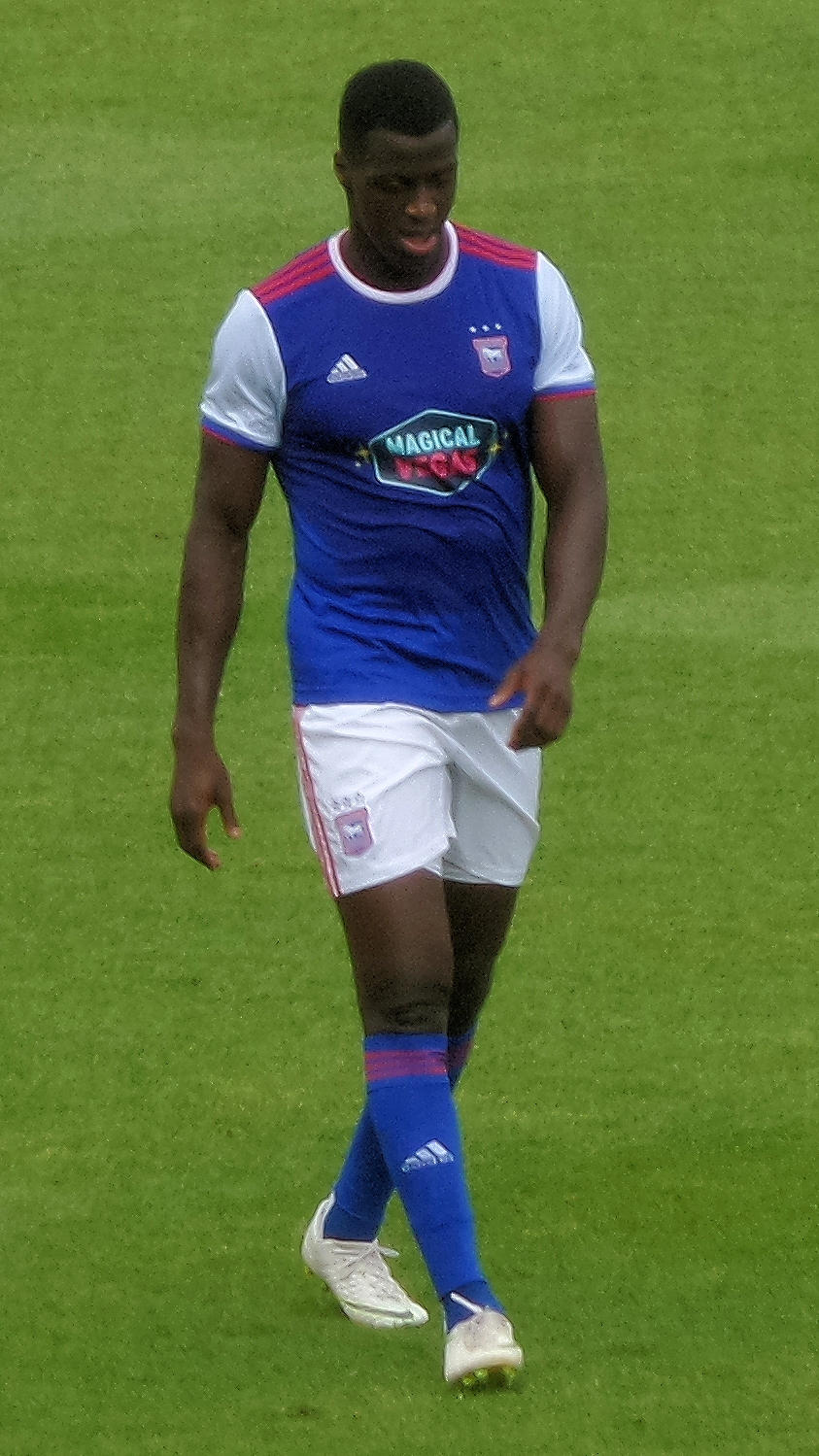
- Emmanuel playing for Ipswich Town in 2018

Personal information
- Full name: Joshua Oluwadurotimi Emmanuel
- Date of birth: 18 August 1997 (age 29)
- Place of birth: London, England
- Height: 5 ft 11 in (1.80 m)
- Positions: Right back; winger

Team information
- Current team: Walton & Hersham
- Number: 34

Youth career
- 2003–2011: West Ham United
- 2011–2015: Ipswich Town

Senior career*
| Years | Team | Apps | (Gls) |
| 2015–2019 | Ipswich Town | 23 | (0) |
| 2015–2016 | → Crawley Town (loan) | 2 | (0) |
| 2017–2018 | → Rotherham United (loan) | 31 | (0) |
| 2018–2019 | → Shrewsbury Town (loan) | 14 | (0) |
| 2019–2020 | Bolton Wanderers | 27 | (0) |
| 2020–2023 | Hull City | 34 | (0) |
| 2023 | Grimsby Town | 17 | (0) |
| 2023–2024 | Carlisle United | 14 | (0) |
| 2024–2025 | Doncaster Rovers | 9 | (0) |
| 2025 | FC Halifax Town | 12 | (0) |
| 2025 | Chelmsford City | 4 | (0) |
| 2026– | Walton & Hersham | 2 | (0) |
- * Club domestic league appearances and goals as of 09:45, 7 October 2026 (UTC)

Joshua Oluwadurotimi Emmanuel (born 18 August 1997) is an English professional footballer plays as a right back for National League South club Walton & Hersham.

Emmanuel came through the youth academies of West Ham United and Ipswich Town before signing professional terms with the latter and going on to make 23 league appearances for the Tractor Boys between 2015 and 2019, as well as spending time on loan initially with Crawley Town. His loan spell during the 2017–18 season with Rotherham United saw him make 31 appearances for The Millers as they were promoted to the EFL Championship through the play-offs. He went on to have a spell with Shrewsbury Town before signing with Bolton Wanderers. He joined Hull City in 2020 and was part of the team who were champions of EFL League One during his first season.

== Club career ==
=== Ipswich Town ===
Born in London, Emmanuel was a schoolboy at West Ham United before joining the youth setup at Ipswich Town.

After progressing through the ranks at Ipswich, Emmanuel was called up by manager Mick McCarthy for the first team on the pre-season tour of Ireland. After being given a number 29 shirt ahead of the new season, Emmanuel signed a professional contract at the club in August 2015, and made his competitive Ipswich debut against Brentford on 8 August 2015 in the first match of the 2015–16 season, in which he set up a goal for Kévin Bru in a 2–2 draw. He then had a handful of first team appearances throughout August before losing his first team place soon after. After his loan spell at Crawley Town came to an end, it wasn't until on 29 April 2016 when he made another appearance for the side, in a 3–2 win over MK Dons.

In the 2016–17 season, Emmanuel started the season on the substitutes bench and did not make his first appearance of the season until 24 September 2016 in a 1–0 loss to Leeds United. However, he appeared in several matches before being demoted to the substitutes bench after Adam Webster, who recovered from his injury. He then signed a two-year contract with the club, keeping him until 2019. Towards the end of the 2016–17 season, Emmanuel then began playing in the right-midfield position. By the end of the 2016–17 season, Emmanuel made the total of 17 appearances in all competitions.

To gain first team experience, Emmanuel joined Crawley Town on loan on 26 November 2015, where he made his debut for the club in a 3–1 loss against Carlisle United three days later. He returned to Ipswich on 3 January 2016.

Emmanuel joined Rotherham United on a season-long loan deal on 13 July 2017. He made his Rotherham United debut, starting the match and playing the full 90 minutes, in a 2–0 loss against Fleetwood Town in the opening game of the season. He went on to make 31 league appearances for Rotherham as the club earned promotion to the EFL Championship, and was voted the club's young player of the year.

In August 2018 Emmanuel joined Shrewsbury Town on loan for the 2018–19 season. He made 14 league appearances for the Shrews before returning to Ipswich on 18 January 2019, after being recalled from his loan spell.

=== Bolton Wanderers ===
On 2 September 2019, Emmanuel joined Bolton Wanderers on a contract until the end of the season, following his release from Ipswich Town a few hours earlier. He made his debut on 14 September, starting against Rotherham United in a 6–1 defeat. On 26 June it was announced Emmanuel would be one of 14 senior players released at the end of his contract on 30 June.

=== Hull City ===
On 7 August 2020, it was announced that Emmanuel would join newly relegated League One club Hull City on a free transfer. Emmanuel signed a two-year deal, with an optional one-year extension. Emmanuel played his first game for the club on 5 September 2020, in the first round of the EFL Cup away against Sunderland, which Hull won on penalties after a 0–0 draw.

In November 2021, Emmanuel fell ill before a game with Birmingham City having fainted. The illness kept him side-lined for the best part of a year.

On 18 May 2022, Hull City exercised an option for an additional year on his contract.

=== Grimsby Town ===
On 31 January 2023, Emmanuel signed a deal with Grimsby Town until the end of the season for an undisclosed fee.

Upon signing for Grimsby, he had not played football since November 2021 due to illness, manager Paul Hurst commented that "He fainted, and without going into too much detail, they weren't quite sure why, but, as I said, he's been playing, he's been training and I think he's got sick of getting fit for no reward at the end of it," In reality, if we can get anything like the Josh Emmanuel of his career so far then the reality is we're getting somebody who us above the level, so that's what we all hope for and I'm sure Josh is exactly the same."

Emmanuel was part of the Grimsby team that reached the quarter finals of the FA Cup following a 2–1 win away at Premier League side Southampton. Following the victory in an interview with the Daily Mirror, Emmanuel opened up about his illness saying it was a clot that initially stunted his speech and he was unable to move the left side of his body.

On 9 May 2023, it was announced that Emmanuel would not be retained for the 2023–24 season and would be leaving the club when his contract expires on 30 June. With it announced the likelihood that Emmanuel would be seeking to find a club higher up the Football League system.

=== Later career ===
On 23 November 2023, Emmanuel joined League One club Carlisle United on a contract until the end of the season having been training with them for a number of weeks. Following the club's relegation, he was released upon the expiration of his contract.

On 6 September 2024, Emmanuel joined League Two Doncaster Rovers on a short term contract.

On 8 March 2025, Emmanuel joined National League side FC Halifax Town.

In December 2025, Emmanuel signed for National League South side Chelmsford City.

On 25 September 2026, Emmanuel joined National League South side Walton & Hersham following a short spell away from the game.

== Personal life ==
Emmanuel is of Nigerian descent. Growing up in Harlow, Essex, Emmanuel supported Arsenal and was raised as a Christian, crediting it for force in his life. Emmanuel revealed that he used to play rugby when he was young and was even offered a trial at Saracens but made it clear he wanted to be a footballer and wouldn't consider rugby as an alternative.

== Career statistics ==
As of 26 December 2024

Appearances and goals by club, season and competition
| Club | Season | League | | | FA Cup | | League Cup | | Other | | Total | |
| Club | Season | Division | Apps | Goals | Apps | Goals | Apps | Goals | Apps | Goals | Apps | Goals |
|---|---|---|---|---|---|---|---|---|---|---|---|---|
| Ipswich Town | 2015–16 | Championship | 4 | 0 | 1 | 0 | 2 | 0 | — | | 7 | 0 |
| Ipswich Town | 2016–17 | Championship | 15 | 0 | 2 | 0 | 0 | 0 | — | | 17 | 0 |
| Ipswich Town | 2017–18 | Championship | 0 | 0 | 0 | 0 | 0 | 0 | — | | 0 | 0 |
| Ipswich Town | 2018–19 | Championship | 4 | 0 | 0 | 0 | 0 | 0 | — | | 4 | 0 |
| Ipswich Town | 2019–20 | League One | 0 | 0 | 0 | 0 | 1 | 0 | 0 | 0 | 1 | 0 |
| Ipswich Town | Total | | 23 | 0 | 3 | 0 | 3 | 0 | 0 | 0 | 29 | 0 |
| Crawley Town (loan) | 2015–16 | League Two | 2 | 0 | 0 | 0 | 0 | 0 | 0 | 0 | 2 | 0 |
| Rotherham United (loan) | 2017–18 | League One | 31 | 0 | 1 | 0 | 1 | 0 | 5 (Note: Two appearances in EFL Trophy, three appearances in EFL League One play-offs) | 0 | 38 | 0 |
| Shrewsbury Town (loan) | 2018–19 | League One | 14 | 0 | 3 | 0 | 0 | 0 | 3 (Note: Appearance(s) in EFL Trophy) | 0 | 20 | 0 |
| Bolton Wanderers | 2019–20 | League One | 27 | 0 | 1 | 0 | 0 | 0 | 3 | 0 | 31 | 0 |
| Hull City | 2020–21 | League One | 28 | 0 | 1 | 0 | 1 | 0 | 1 | 0 | 31 | 0 |
| Hull City | 2021–22 | Championship | 6 | 0 | 0 | 0 | 1 | 0 | 0 | 0 | 7 | 0 |
| Hull City | Total | | 34 | 0 | 1 | 0 | 2 | 0 | 1 | 0 | 38 | 0 |
| Grimsby Town | 2022–23 | League Two | 17 | 0 | 1 | 0 | 0 | 0 | 0 | 0 | 18 | 0 |
| Carlisle United | 2023–24 | League One | 14 | 0 | 0 | 0 | 0 | 0 | 0 | 0 | 14 | 0 |
| Doncaster Rovers | 2024–25 | League Two | 5 | 0 | 1 | 0 | 0 | 0 | 3 | 0 | 9 | 0 |
| Career Total | | | 167 | 0 | 11 | 0 | 6 | 0 | 15 | 0 | 199 | 0 |

== Honours ==
Rotherham United

- EFL League One play-offs: 2018

Hull City

- EFL League One: 2020–21

Individual

- Rotherham United Young Player of the Year: 2017–18
