= 2020–21 Sheffield Wednesday F.C. season =

English football club season

Sheffield Wednesday
2020–21 season
- Chairman: Dejphon Chansiri
- Manager: Garry Monk (until 9 November); Tony Pulis (13 November – 28 December); Darren Moore (from 1 March)
- Stadium: Hillsborough, Owlerton
- Championship: 24th (relegated)
- FA Cup: Fourth round (vs. Everton)
- EFL Cup: Third round (vs. Fulham)
- Top goalscorer: League: Josh Windass (9 goals); All: Josh Windass (10 goals)
Home colours	Away colours

The 2020–21 season is Sheffield Wednesday's ninth consecutive season in the Championship. The season covers the period from 1 July 2020 to 30 June 2021.

== Season overview ==
=== July ===
On 31 July, Wednesday received a 12-point penalty for breaching the League's Profitability and Sustainability Rules for the three season reporting period ending in 2017–18, with the penalty taking effect for the 2020–21 season.

=== August ===
On 12 August, the club restructured their coaching setup with James Beattie coming in as assistant manager, Darryl Flahavan as the goalkeeper coach and Andrew Hughes as first team coach.

On 14 August, Lee Bullen and Nicky Weaver left the first team to work with the academy.

On 17 August, Wednesday announced they would be appealing the 12 point penalty, with a verdict not expected until later in the year.

=== October ===
On 7 October, it was revealed that owner Dejphon Chansiri was securing debt against the club's Hillsborough Stadium.

=== November ===
On 4 November, their 12-point penalty was reduced to 6 points following discussions with the League Arbitration Panel.

On 9 November, Garry Monk and his staff had their contracts terminated after 3 wins from their opening 11 games

On 13 November, experienced manager Tony Pulis would be appointed the new manager,

On 18 November, Pulis would bring in Craig Gardner as his first team coach.

On 20 November, Pulis would bring in Mike Trusson as his assistant manager

=== December ===
On 17 December, it was announced that the players were not paid in full for the month of November, the second time this has happened in 2020.

On 28 December, Tony Pulis would be relieved of his duties after 10 games in charge, picking up 7 points from a possible 30 and just one win. The chairman would also say "there are also other issues which have had a bearing on this decision." First team coach Neil Thompson would be placed in charge in a caretaker role.

=== January ===
On 7 January, while Neil Thompson was in caretaker charge, himself with assistants Lee Bullen and Steve Haslam would be affected with COVID-19, meaning they would miss their FA Cup third round clash with Exeter City. Academy coach Andy Holdsworth, assisted by Daral Pugh, Nicky Weaver and Tony Strudwick would take charge of the game.

On 13 January, the club's next two league games against Coventry City and Wycombe Wanderers were suspended following other positive COVID-19 tests.

On 31 January, it was announce that the players were not paid again for the month of January, with news that salaries were capped at £7,000 per month.

=== February ===
On 8 February, it was leaked that Spanish entrepreneur and former advisor to the club, Erik Alonso had an offer to buy the club rejected by Dejphon Chansiri. The offer was rumoured to be between £25m - £30m and backed by a wealthy Indonesian consortium.

=== March ===
On 1 March, Darren Moore was appointed the first team manager and the third permanent manager of the season, leaving his position at Doncaster Rovers. He would be joined by Jamie Smith as his assistant manager and Paul Williams as his first team coach.

On 9 March, the club published the club's annual accounts for the year ending 31 July 2019.

=== April ===
On 2 April, prior to the game against Watford it was announced manager Darren Moore wouldn't be in the dugout due to a positive COVID-19 test.

On 15 April, after Darren Moore's return to the dugout, he would suffer a setback in his recovery, developing pneumonia as a result of COVID-19.

On 26 April, Owls youngster Will Trueman would win the prestigious LFE Championship Apprentice of the Year award.

=== May ===
On 8 May, Darren Moore would return to the dugout for the crucial end of season game against Derby County. The game would see Wednesday, after 9 years in the Championship, relegated back to League One following a 3–3 draw in the must win game. After the match, Chansiri confirmed that manager Darren Moore would remain manager for the following season.

On 20 May, it was announced that Liam Dooley would be the new Chief Operating Officer for the club.

On 31 May, it was revealed again that players had still not been paid in full for some months and that there were some players considering walking away over ongoing wages issues.

=== June ===
On 25 June, Wednesday announced a new long-term partnership with Italian sportswear provider Macron, commencing from 1 July 2021.

Also on 25 June, Adriano Basso was appointed the new first team goalkeeper coach.

On 28 June, their 2021/22 pre-season officially began with a 10-day training camp in Wales.

== Pre-season ==
As of 21 August, Wednesday announced one pre-season friendly against Leicester City.

29 August 2020 Friendly	Sheffield Wednesday	0–0	Leicester City	Loughborough
12:00 BST		Report		Stadium: Loughborough University Stadium

== Competitions ==
=== Championship ===
==== League table ====
Pos	Team	Pld	W	D	L	GF	GA	GD	Pts	Promotion, qualification or relegation
19	Bristol City	46	15	6	25	46	68	−22	51	
20	Huddersfield Town	46	12	13	21	50	71	−21	49	
21	Derby County	46	11	11	24	36	58	−22	44	
22	Wycombe Wanderers (R)	46	11	10	25	39	69	−30	43	Relegation to EFL League One
23	Rotherham United (R)	46	11	9	26	44	60	−16	42	Relegation to EFL League One
24	Sheffield Wednesday (R)	46	12	11	23	40	61	−21	41 (Note: Sheffield Wednesday received a 12 point deduction for breaching the League's Profitability and Sustainability Rules. This was later reduced to 6 points by an Independent League Arbitration panel.)	Relegation to EFL League One

Source: EFL Official Website
Rules for classification: 1) Points; 2) Goal difference; 3) Number of goals scored; 4) Head-to-head results; 5) Wins; 6) Away goals; 7) Penalty points (sec 9.5); 8) 12-point sending off offences
(R) Relegated

==== Results summary ====
Overall								Home						Away					
Pld	W	D	L	GF	GA	GD	Pts	W	D	L	GF	GA	GD	W	D	L	GF	GA	GD
46	12	11	23	40	61	−21	41	8	8	7	22	17	+5	4	3	16	18	44	−26

Last updated: 8 May 2021.

==== Results by matchday ====
Matchday	1	2	3	4	5	6	7	8	9	10	11	12	13	14	15	16	17	18	19	20	21	22	23	24	25	26	27	28	29	30	31	32	33	34	35	36	37	38	39	40	41	42	43	44	45	46
Ground	A	H	A	H	A	H	H	A	A	H	H	A	A	H	H	A	A	H	A	H	A	H	H	A	H	A	A	H	A	H	A	A	H	A	H	H	A	A	H	A	H	H	H	A	H	A
Result	W	D	L	D	W	L	L	L	L	W	D	L	D	D	D	L	L	L	L	W	D	W	W	L	W	W	L	W	L	L	L	L	L	L	L	D	W	L	W	L	L	D	W	L	D	D
Position	24	24	24	24	24	24	24	24	24	24	23	23	23	23	23	24	24	24	24	23	23	22	21	23	23	23	23	21	22	23	23	23	23	23	23	23	23	23	23	23	23	23	23	23	23	24

Updated to match(es) played on 8 May 2021. Source: Statto.com
A = Away; H = Home; W = Win; D = Draw; L = Loss

==== Matches ====
On Friday, 21 August 2020, the EFL Championship fixtures were revealed.

12 September 2020 1	Cardiff City	0–2	Sheffield Wednesday	Leckwith, Cardiff
15:00 BST		Report	Windass 4'; Rhodes 44'; Luongo (yellow card) 74'	Stadium: Cardiff City Stadium; Referee: Andy Madley

19 September 2020 2	Sheffield Wednesday	0–0	Watford	Owlerton, Sheffield
15:00 BST	Luongo (yellow card) 65'; Bannan (yellow card) 68'	Report	Chalobah (yellow card) 81'; Garner (yellow card) 88'	Stadium: Hillsborough; Referee: Jarred Gillett

27 September 2020 3	Bristol City	2–0	Sheffield Wednesday	Ashton Gate, Bristol
14:00 BST	Bakinson (yellow card) 34'; Paterson (yellow card) 44' (goal) 90+3'; Rowe 60'	Report	Harris (yellow card) 71'	Stadium: Ashton Gate Stadium; Attendance: 0 Referee: Tony Harrington

3 October 2020 4	Sheffield Wednesday	1–1	Queens Park Rangers	Owlerton, Sheffield
15:00 BST	Paterson (yellow card) 52'; Barbet 54' (o.g.); Luongo (yellow card) 63'	Report	Barbet (yellow card) 77'; Bonne 90+5'	Stadium: Hillsborough; Attendance: 0 Referee: Graham Salisbury

17 October 2020 5	Birmingham City	0–1	Sheffield Wednesday	Bordsley, Birmingham
15:00 BST	Gardner (yellow card) 66'	Report	Bannan 49' (pen.); Kachunga (yellow card) 74'	Stadium: St. Andrew's Trillion Trophy Stadium; Attendance: 0 Referee: Graham Scott

21 October 2020 6	Sheffield Wednesday	1–2	Brentford	Owlerton, Sheffield
19:45 BST	Paterson 25'; Odubajo (yellow card) 73'	Report	Toney 7', 30'	Stadium: Hillsborough; Attendance: 0 Referee: Darren Bond
Note: Live on Sky Sports

24 October 2020 7	Sheffield Wednesday	0–1	Luton Town	Owlerton, Sheffield
15:00 BST	Odubajo (yellow card) 60' van Aken (red card) 71'	Report	Ruddock 74'; Cranie (yellow card) 90+1'	Stadium: Hillsborough; Attendance: 0 Referee: Geoff Eltringham

28 October 2020 8	Rotherham United	3–0	Sheffield Wednesday	Rotherham
19:45 GMT	Lindsay 5', 45'; Blackman (yellow card) 26'; Barlaser 40' (pen.); Miller (yellow card) 71'; Hirst (yellow card) 75'	Report	Palmer (yellow card) 19'; Lees (red card) 39'; Odubajo (yellow card) 73'	Stadium: New York Stadium; Attendance: 0 Referee: Jarred Gillett

31 October 2020 9	Wycombe Wanderers	1–0	Sheffield Wednesday	High Wycombe
15:00 GMT	Wheeler 45+2'; Jacobson (yellow card) 46'; Allsop (yellow card) 90+1'	Report	Paterson (yellow card) 32'; Bannan (yellow card) 49'	Stadium: Adams Park; Attendance: 0 Referee: Keith Stroud

3 November 2020 10	Sheffield Wednesday	1–0	Bournemouth	Owlerton, Sheffield
19:00 BST	Kachunga (yellow card) 10'; Pelupessy (yellow card) 42'; Palmer (yellow card) 44'; Börner (yellow card) 60'; Bannan 69' (pen.); Harris (red card) 90+5'	Report	Lerma (yellow card) 34'; Cook (red card) 69'; Mepham (yellow card) 90+9'	Stadium: Hillsborough; Attendance: 0 Referee: Jeremy Simpson

7 November 2020 11	Sheffield Wednesday	0–0	Millwall	Owlerton, Sheffield
15:00 BST	van Aken (yellow card) 65'; Brown (yellow card) 90+8'	Report		Stadium: Hillsborough; Attendance: 0 Referee: Tony Harrington

21 November 2020 12	Preston North End	1–0	Sheffield Wednesday	Deepdale, Preston
15:00 GMT	Barkhuizen 48'	Report	Windass (red card) 17' van Aken (yellow card) 86'	Stadium: Deepdale; Attendance: 0 Referee: David Webb

25 November 2020 13	Swansea City	1–1	Sheffield Wednesday	Landore, Swansea
19:45 GMT	Cabango (yellow card) 26'; Grimes (yellow card) 48'; Dhanda (yellow card) 57'; Ayew 60'	Report	Reach 27'	Stadium: Liberty Stadium; Attendance: 0 Referee: Andy Woolmer
Note: Live on Sky Sports

28 November 2020 14	Sheffield Wednesday	0–0	Stoke City	Owlerton, Sheffield
15:00 BST	Shaw (yellow card) 42'; Harris (yellow card) 68'; Bannan (yellow card) 79'; Luongo (yellow card) 86'	Report	Collins (yellow card) 67'; Clucas (yellow card) 86'	Stadium: Hillsborough; Attendance: 0 Referee: Tim Robinson

2 December 2020 15	Sheffield Wednesday	1–1	Reading	Owlerton, Sheffield
19:45 BST	Paterson 12' (yellow card) 59'; Shaw (red card) 30'; Luongo (yellow card) 53'	Report	Joao 44'	Stadium: Hillsborough; Attendance: 0 Referee: Oliver Langford

5 December 2020 16	Norwich City	2–1	Sheffield Wednesday	Norwich
15:00 GMT	Skipp (yellow card) 79'; Martin 81'; Aarons 84'	Report	Odubajo (yellow card) 22'; Windass 60'; Börner (yellow card) 70'	Stadium: Carrow Road; Attendance: 2,000; Referee: Jarred Gillett

8 December 2020 17	Huddersfield Town	2–0	Sheffield Wednesday	Huddersfield
19:45 GMT	Koroma 11'; Mbenza 24'; Bacuna (penalty missed) 49'; Toffolo (yellow card) 71'	Report	Palmer (yellow card) 22'; Harris (yellow card) 71'; Lees (yellow card) 86'	Stadium: John Smith's Stadium; Attendance: 0 Referee: Keith Stroud

12 December 2020 18	Sheffield Wednesday	1–2	Barnsley	Owlerton, Sheffield
15:00 BST	Windass 4'; Bannan (yellow card) 31'	Report	Woodrow 14'; Frieser 37'	Stadium: Hillsborough; Attendance: 0 Referee: James Linington

15 December 2020 19	Nottingham Forest	2–0	Sheffield Wednesday	West Bridgford
19:45 BST	Ribeiro 4'; Grabban 87'	Report		Stadium: City Ground; Attendance: 0 Referee: Steve Martin

19 December 2020 20	Sheffield Wednesday	1–0	Coventry City	Owlerton, Sheffield
15:00 GMT	Pelupessy (yellow card) 50'; Lees 67'; Reach (yellow card) 79'	Report	Østigård (yellow card) 66'	Stadium: Hillsborough; Attendance: 0 Referee: John Brooks

26 December 2020 21	Blackburn Rovers	1–1	Sheffield Wednesday	Blackburn
15:00 GMT	Rothwell 76'; Lenihan (yellow card) 79'	Report	Reach 41'	Stadium: Ewood Park; Attendance: 0 Referee: Tony Harrington

29 December 2020 22	Sheffield Wednesday	2–1	Middlesbrough	Owlerton, Sheffield
19:00 GMT	Paterson 30'; Shaw 40'; Bannan (yellow card) 45+4'	Report	Saville (yellow card) 42'; Morsy (yellow card) 45+4'; Watmore 49'	Stadium: Hillsborough; Attendance: 0 Referee: Geoff Eltringham

1 January 2021 23	Sheffield Wednesday	1–0	Derby County	Owlerton, Sheffield
17:30 GMT	Paterson 61'	Report	Kazim-Richards (yellow card) 90+3'; Jóźwiak (yellow card) 90+4'	Stadium: Hillsborough; Attendance: 0 Referee: Matt Donohue

27 January 2021 24	Coventry City	2–0	Sheffield Wednesday	Bordsley, Birmingham
19:00 BST	Gyokeres 57'; Hyam (yellow card) 60'; James (yellow card) 87'; Allen 90'	Report	Pelupessy (yellow card) 24'; Penney (yellow card) 50'; Börner (yellow card) 85'	Stadium: St. Andrew's Trillion Trophy Stadium; Attendance: 0 Referee: Leigh Doughty

30 January 2021 25	Sheffield Wednesday	1–0	Preston North End	Owlerton, Sheffield
15:00 GMT	Palmer 45'; Urhoghide (yellow card) 86'	Report	Whiteman (yellow card) 54'	Stadium: Hillsborough; Attendance: 0 Referee: Andre Marriner

2 February 2021 26	Bournemouth	1–2	Sheffield Wednesday	Kings Park, Bournemouth
19:00 BST	Stanislas 66' (pen.); Riquelme (yellow card) 90+7'	Report	Paterson 44'; Dunkley (yellow card) 83'; Rhodes 90'; Bannan (yellow card) 90+7'	Stadium: Vitality Stadium; Attendance: 0 Referee: Andy Woolmer

6 February 2021 27	Millwall	4–1	Sheffield Wednesday	Bermondsey
15:00 GMT	Hutchinson (yellow card) 23'; Zohore 39' (pen.); Malone 68'; Thompson 69'; Bradshaw 90'	Report	Paterson 10'; Urhoghide (yellow card) 84'	Stadium: The Den; Attendance: 0 Referee: Geoff Eltringham

9 February 2021 28	Sheffield Wednesday	2–0	Wycombe Wanderers	Owlerton, Sheffield
19:00 GMT	Rhodes 34'; Reach 76'	Report	Obita (yellow card) 47'; Tafazolli (yellow card) 63'	Stadium: Hillsborough; Attendance: 0 Referee: Gavin Ward

16 February 2021 29	Stoke City	1–0	Sheffield Wednesday	Stoke-on-Trent
19:00 GMT	Fletcher 83'	Report	Hutchinson (yellow card) 41'	Stadium: Bet365 Stadium; Attendance: 0 Referee: James Linington

20 February 2021 30	Sheffield Wednesday	0–1	Birmingham City	Owlerton, Sheffield
15:00 GMT	Shaw (red card) 44'	Report	Clarke-Salter (yellow card) 22'; Etheridge (yellow card) 53'; Hogan 63'	Stadium: Hillsborough; Attendance: 0 Referee: Lee Mason

24 February 2021 31	Brentford	3–0	Sheffield Wednesday	Brentford
19:00 GMT	Mbeumo 23'; Ghoddos (yellow card) 30', (goal) 74'; Canós (yellow card) 39'; Dalsgaard (yellow card) 72'; Sørensen 83'	Report	Penney (yellow card) 82'	Stadium: Brentford Community Stadium; Attendance: 0 Referee: Jeremy Simpson

27 February 2021 32	Luton Town	3–2	Sheffield Wednesday	Luton
15:00 GMT	Naismith 50'; Tunnicliffe 58'; Rea (yellow card) 84'; Adebayo 86'	Report	Windass 6', 42'; Hutchinson (yellow card) 82'; Urhoghide (yellow card) 85'	Stadium: Kenilworth Road; Attendance: 0 Referee: Michael Salisbury

3 March 2021 33	Sheffield Wednesday	1–2	Rotherham United	Owlerton, Sheffield
19:45 GMT	Olosunde 82' (o.g.); Harris (yellow card) 90+5'	Report	Smith 17', (red card) 66'; Ladapo 90+7'	Stadium: Hillsborough; Attendance: 0 Referee: Darren Bond
Note: Live on Sky Sports

6 March 2021 34	Reading	3–0	Sheffield Wednesday	Reading
15:00 GMT	Olise 30' (pen.); Moore (yellow card) 37'; João 65'; Yiadom 88'	Report	Börner (red card) 29'	Stadium: The Madejski Stadium; Attendance: 0 Referee: James Linington

14 March 2021 35	Sheffield Wednesday	1–2	Norwich City	Owlerton, Sheffield
12:15 GMT	Rhodes 7'; Harris (yellow card) 45+4'; Bannan (yellow card) 71'	Report	Gibson (yellow card) 6'; McLean (yellow card) 40'; Pukki 61'; Cantwell 77'; Hugill (yellow card) 90+4'	Stadium: Hillsborough; Attendance: 0 Referee: Tony Harrington
Note: Live on Sky Sports

17 March 2021 36	Sheffield Wednesday	1–1	Huddersfield Town	Owlerton, Sheffield
19:45 GMT	Palmer (yellow card) 10'; Windass 36'	Report	Pipa (yellow card) 10'; Paterson 72' (o.g.)	Stadium: Hillsborough; Attendance: 0 Referee: Robert Jones

20 March 2021 37	Barnsley	1–2	Sheffield Wednesday	Barnsley
15:00 GMT	Halme (yellow card) 71'; Morris 78'	Report	Lees (yellow card) 25'; Börner (yellow card) 36'; Rhodes 38', 53'; Paterson (yellow card) 87'; Wildsmith (yellow card) 88'	Stadium: Oakwell Stadium; Attendance: 0 Referee: Tim Robinson

2 April 2021 38	Watford	1–0	Sheffield Wednesday	Watford
15:00 BST	Lees 7' (o.g.); Sierralta (yellow card) 30'; Hughes (yellow card) 64'	Report	Börner (yellow card) 3'; Urhoghide (yellow card) 38'; Reach (yellow card) 41'; Wildsmith (yellow card) 78'	Stadium: Vicarage Road; Attendance: 0 Referee: Chris Kavanagh

5 April 2021 39	Sheffield Wednesday	5–0	Cardiff City	Owlerton, Sheffield
17:30 BST	Börner 4'; Paterson 20'; Reach 23', 69'; Rhodes 65'	Report		Stadium: Hillsborough; Referee: David Webb (Lancashire)
Note: Live on Sky Sports

10 April 2021 40	Queens Park Rangers	4–1	Sheffield Wednesday	White City
15:00 BST	Dykes 27', 60'; Johansen 50'; Field (yellow card) 64'; Kakay (yellow card) 90'; Willock 90+2'	Report	Windass 30'	Stadium: Kiyan Prince Foundation Stadium; Attendance: 0 Referee: John Brooks

13 April 2021 41	Sheffield Wednesday	0–2	Swansea City	Owlerton, Sheffield
18:00 BST		Report	Lowe 31'; Fulton 73'	Stadium: Hillsborough; Attendance: 0 Referee: Matt Donohue

17 April 2021 42	Sheffield Wednesday	1–1	Bristol City	Owlerton, Sheffield
12:30 BST	Börner 4'; Hutchinson (yellow card) 8'; Bannan (penalty missed)	Report	Lansbury (red card) 21'; Bakinson 87'	Stadium: Hillsborough; Attendance: 0 Referee: Tony Harrington

20 April 2021 43	Sheffield Wednesday	1–0	Blackburn Rovers	Owlerton, Sheffield
19:00 BST	Hutchinson (yellow card) 15'; Windass 37'; Bannan (yellow card) 80'	Report	Evans (yellow card) 40'; Rothwell (yellow card) 73'	Stadium: Hillsborough; Attendance: 0 Referee: Paul Tierney

24 April 2021 44	Middlesbrough	3–1	Sheffield Wednesday	Middlesbrough
15:00 BST	Bolasie 20'; McNair (yellow card) 27'; Coburn 73'; Watmore 81'	Report	Windass 39' (pen.)	Stadium: Riverside Stadium; Attendance: 0 Referee: Jarred Gillett

1 May 2021 45	Sheffield Wednesday	0–0	Nottingham Forest	Owlerton, Sheffield
12:30 BST	Palmer (yellow card) 41'; Paterson (yellow card) 61'	Report	Grabban (penalty missed) 45+1'; Yates (yellow card) 47'; Knockaert (yellow card) 69'	Stadium: Hillsborough; Attendance: 0 Referee: Tim Robinson

8 May 2021 46	Derby County	3–3	Sheffield Wednesday	Derby
12:30 BST	Waghorn 49', 78' (pen.); Roberts 52'; Kazim Richards (yellow card) 60'; Jóźwiak (yellow card) 76'; Ebosele (yellow card) 86'	Report	Bannan (yellow card) 45+2'; Hutchinson 45+4'; Paterson 62'; Börner 69'; Dunkley (yellow card) 77'; Harris (yellow card) 90+6'	Stadium: Pride Park Stadium; Attendance: 0 Referee: Mike Dean

=== FA Cup ===
The third round draw was made on 30 November, with Premier League and EFL Championship clubs all entering the competition. The draw for the fourth and fifth round were made on 11 January, conducted by Peter Crouch.

9 January 2021 Third round	Exeter City	0–2	Sheffield Wednesday	Exeter
15:00 GMT		Report	Reach 27'; Paterson 90'	Stadium: St James Park; Attendance: 0 Referee: Dean Whitestone

24 January 2021 Fourth round	Everton	3–0	Sheffield Wednesday	Walton, Liverpool
20:00 GMT	Calvert-Lewin 29'; Richarlison 59'; Mina 62'; Godfrey (yellow card) 71'	Report		Stadium: Goodison Park; Attendance: 0 Referee: Graham Scott

=== EFL Cup ===
The first round draw was made on 18 August, live on Sky Sports, by Paul Merson. The draw for both the second and third round were confirmed on September 6, live on Sky Sports by Phil Babb.

5 September 2020 First round	Walsall	0–0 (2–4 p)	Sheffield Wednesday	Bescot, Walsall
14:15 BST		Report	Bannan (yellow card) 40'; Börner (yellow card) 55'	Stadium: Banks's Stadium; Attendance: 0 Referee: Peter Wright
	Penalties
	Holden (penalty scored); Gordon (penalty missed); Adebayo (penalty scored); Bates (penalty missed)		Bannan (penalty scored); Windass (penalty scored); Harris (penalty scored); Brown (penalty scored)
Note: Live on Sky Sports

15 September 2020 Second round	Rochdale	0–2	Sheffield Wednesday	Rochdale
19:45 BST	O'Connell (yellow card) 45+1'	Report	Pelupessy (yellow card) 34'; Kachunga 54'; Hunt (yellow card) 57'; Reach (yellow card) 64'; Windass 88'	Stadium: Spotland Stadium; Attendance: 0 Referee: Seb Stockbridge

23 September 2020 Third round	Fulham	2–0	Sheffield Wednesday	Fulham
19:00 BST	Kamara 9'; Decordova-Reid 32'; Odoi (yellow card) 53'	Report	Odubajo (yellow card) 63'	Stadium: Craven Cottage; Attendance: 0 Referee: Lee Mason

== Transfers and contracts ==
=== Transfers in ===
Date	Position	Nationality	Name	From	Fee	Ref.
28 July 2020	CM	(England)	Fisayo Dele-Bashiru	(England) Manchester City	Undisclosed	
13 August 2020	CB	(England)	Chey Dunkley	(England) Wigan Athletic	Free transfer	
2 September 2020	CF	(Democratic Republic of the Congo)	Elias Kachunga	(England) Huddersfield Town	Free transfer	
2 September 2020	AM	(England)	Josh Windass	(England) Wigan Athletic	Undisclosed	
12 September 2020	RW	(Nigeria)	Korede Adedoyin	(England) Everton	Free transfer	
30 September 2020	FW	(Scotland)	Callum Paterson	(Wales) Cardiff City	Undisclosed	
14 January 2021	RW	(England)	Andre Green	(England) Aston Villa	Free transfer	
18 January 2021	LW	(England)	Calum Huxley	(Wales) Wrexham	Free transfer	
25 January 2021	CM	(England)	Sam Hutchinson	(Cyprus) Pafos	Free transfer	

=== Transfers out ===
Date	Position	Nationality	Name	To	Fee	Ref.
1 July 2020	FW	(England)	L'Varn Brandy	(England) Allenton United F.C.	Released	
1 July 2020	FW	(Bulgaria)	Preslav Borukov	(Bulgaria) Etar	Released	
1 July 2020	FW	(The Gambia)	Omar Damba	(Spain) FC Santboià	Released	
1 July 2020	LB	(England)	Michael Ellery	(England) Witton Albion	Released	
1 July 2020	FW	(Scotland)	Steven Fletcher	(England) Stoke City	Released	
1 July 2020	FW	(Italy)	Fernando Forestieri	(Italy) Udinese	Released	
1 July 2020	LB	(Wales)	Morgan Fox	(England) Stoke City	Released	
1 July 2020	CM	(England)	Sam Hutchinson	(Cyprus) Pafos	Released	
1 July 2020	DM	(England)	Toby Kenyon	(England) Stocksbridge Park Steels	Released	
1 July 2020	CM	(England)	Connor Kirby	(England) Harrogate Town	Released	
1 July 2020	DF	(England)	Jack Lee	Free agent	Released	
1 July 2020	FW	(England)	Jordan O’Brien	(England) Corby Town	Released	
1 July 2020	DF	(England)	Sam Oliver	(England) Irlam	Released	
1 July 2020	FW	(Scotland)	Fraser Preston	(England) Boston United	Released	
1 July 2020	RM	(England)	Jack Stobbs	(England) Grantham Town	Released	
1 July 2020	FW	(England)	Elliott Vasalo	(England) Winterton Rangers	Released	
1 July 2020	DF	(England)	Joe West	(England) Farsley Celtic	Released	
1 July 2020	FW	(England)	Sam Winnall	(England) Oxford United	Released	
1 August 2020	GK	(England)	Paul Jones	(England) King's Lynn Town	Released	
1 August 2020	CM	(England)	Kieran Lee	(England) Bolton Wanderers	Released	
1 August 2020	FW	(Kosovo)	Atdhe Nuhiu	(Cyprus) APOEL	Released	
9 December 2020	RW	(Argentina)	Manuel Hidalgo	(Malaysia) Sri Pahang	Released	
1 February 2021	CM	(Republic of Ireland)	Conor Grant	(England) Rochdale	Undisclosed	

=== Loans in ===
Date	Position	Nationality	Name	From	End date	Ref.
20 August 2020	AM	(England)	Izzy Brown	(England) Chelsea	30 June 2021	
16 October 2020	FW	(England)	Jack Marriott	(England) Derby County	30 June 2021	
16 October 2020	CB	(England)	Aden Flint	(Wales) Cardiff City	4 January 2021	

=== New contracts ===
Date from	Position	Nationality	Name	Length	Expiry	Ref.
18 February 2021	MF	(Scotland)	Barry Bannan	2 years	June 2023	
12 May 2021	DF	(England)	Ryan Galvin	1 year	June 2022	
12 May 2021	MF	(England)	Lewis Farmer	1 year	June 2022	
12 May 2021	GK	(England)	Luke Jackson	1 year	June 2022	
12 May 2021	DF	(England)	Declan Thompson	1 year	June 2022	
12 May 2021	MF	(England)	Liam Waldock	1 year	June 2022	
20 May 2021	DF	(Republic of Ireland)	Ciaran Brennan	1 year	June 2022	
20 May 2021	MF	(England)	Alex Hunt	1 year	June 2022	
20 May 2021	MF	(England)	Sam Hutchinson	1 year	June 2022	
26 June 2021	FW	(Portugal)	Paulo Aguas	—	—	
26 June 2021	FW	(England)	Alex Bonnington	—	—	
26 June 2021	DF	(England)	Josh Dawodu	—	—	
26 June 2021	MF	(England)	Jay Glover	—	—	
26 June 2021	FW	(England)	Charles Hagan	—	—	
26 June 2021	GK	(England)	Josh Render	—	—	
26 June 2021	MF	(England)	Will Trueman	—	—	
26 June 2021	FW	(Belgium)	Basile Zottos	—	—	

== Squad statistics ==
=== Appearances ===
As of 8 May 2021

No.	Pos	Nat	Player	Total		League		FA Cup		League Cup	
No.	Pos	Nat	Player	Apps	Goals	Apps	Goals	Apps	Goals	Apps	Goals4
1	GK	(Republic of Ireland) IRL	Keiren Westwood	20	0	20	0	0	0	0	0
2	DF	(Scotland) SCO	Liam Palmer	41	1	31+8	1	0	0	2	0
4	DF	(Netherlands) NED	Joost van Aken	17	0	16+1	0	0	0	0	0
5	FW	(Scotland) SCO	Callum Paterson	45	9	34+9	8	2	1	0	0
6	MF	(England) ENG	Sam Hutchinson	22	1	22	1	0	0	0	0
7	MF	(England) ENG	Kadeem Harris	41	0	30+8	0	2	0	1	0
8	MF	(Netherlands) NED	Joey Pelupessy	43	0	24+15	0	2	0	2	0
9	FW	(England) ENG	Jack Marriott	13	0	4+8	0	0+1	0	0	0
10	MF	(Scotland) SCO	Barry Bannan	49	2	46	2	2	0	1	0
11	MF	(England) ENG	Adam Reach	49	6	38+6	5	2	1	3	0
13	DF	(Germany) GER	Julian Börner	30	3	25+1	3	1	0	3	0
14	DF	(England) ENG	Matt Penney	15	0	10+2	0	0+1	0	0+2	0
15	DF	(England) ENG	Tom Lees	39	1	38	1	0	0	1	0
16	MF	(England) ENG	Andre Green	12	0	3+8	0	1	0	0	0
17	MF	(England) ENG	Fisayo Dele-Bashiru	13	0	2+6	0	0+2	0	3	0
18	FW	(England) ENG	Josh Windass	44	10	35+6	9	0+1	0	0+2	1
19	DF	(England) ENG	Osaze Urhoghide	17	0	12+4	0	1	0	0	0
20	FW	(Scotland) SCO	Jordan Rhodes	39	7	16+21	7	0	0	0+2	0
21	MF	(Australia) AUS	Massimo Luongo	13	0	10+2	0	0	0	1	0
22	DF	(England) ENG	Moses Odubajo	22	0	15+3	0	1	0	3	0
23	DF	(England) ENG	Chey Dunkley	12	0	10+2	0	0	0	0	0
24	MF	(England) ENG	Izzy Brown	21	0	4+15	0	0+1	0	1	0
25	GK	(England) ENG	Cameron Dawson	9	0	8	0	0	0	1	0
26	MF	(England) ENG	Liam Shaw	22	1	13+6	1	1	0	2	0
27	DF	(England) ENG	Dominic Iorfa	12	0	9+1	0	0	0	1+1	0
28	GK	(England) ENG	Joe Wildsmith	23	0	18+1	0	2	0	2	0
29	MF	(England) ENG	Alex Hunt	5	0	1+2	0	1	0	1	0
34	DF	(Republic of Ireland) IRL	Ciaran Brennan	4	0	0	0	2	0	2	0
37	DF	(England) ENG	Ryan Galvin	2	0	0	0	2	0	0	0
38	DF	(England) ENG	Declan Eratt-Thompson	1	0	0	0	0+1	0	0	0
39	DF	(England) ENG	Isaac Rice	1	0	0	0	0+1	0	0	0
41	FW	(England) ENG	Charles Hagan	1	0	0	0	0	0	0+1	0
42	MF	(England) ENG	Liam Waldock	1	0	0	0	0	0	1	0
45	FW	(Democratic Republic of the Congo) COD	Elias Kachunga	29	1	9+18	0	0	0	2	1
Players that left the club mid-season:
6	DF	(England) ENG	Aden Flint	4	0	4	0	0	0	0	0
40	MF	(Republic of Ireland) IRL	Conor Grant	1	0	0	0	0	0	0+1	0

=== Goalscorers ===
As of 8 May 2021

Includes all competitive matches.

Rank	Pos.	Nat.	No.	Player	Championship	FA Cup	League Cup	Total
1	FW	(England)	18	Josh Windass	9	0	1	10
2	FW	(Scotland)	5	Callum Paterson	8	1	0	9
3	FW	(Scotland)	20	Jordan Rhodes	7	0	0	7
4	MF	(England)	11	Adam Reach	5	1	0	6
5	DF	(Germany)	13	Julian Börner	3	0	0	3
6	MF	(Scotland)	10	Barry Bannan	2	0	0	2
7	DF	(Scotland)	2	Liam Palmer	1	0	0	1
7	DF	(England)	6	Sam Hutchinson	1	0	0	1
7	DF	(England)	15	Tom Lees	1	0	0	1
7	MF	(England)	26	Liam Shaw	1	0	0	1
7	FW	(Democratic Republic of the Congo)	45	Elias Kachunga	0	0	1	1
Own goals					2	0	0	2
Total					40	2	2	44

=== Disciplinary record ===
As of 8 May 2021

No.	Pos.	Name	Championship		FA Cup		League Cup		Total	
No.	Pos.	Name	Booked	Sent off (straight red)	Booked	Sent off (straight red)	Booked	Sent off (straight red)	Booked	Sent off (straight red)
26	MF	Liam Shaw	2	2	0	0	0	0	2	2
7	MF	Kadeem Harris	6	1	0	0	0	0	6	1
13	DF	Julian Börner	5	1	0	0	1	0	6	1
4	DF	Joost van Aken	2	1	0	0	0	0	2	1
15	DF	Tom Lees	2	1	0	0	0	0	2	1
18	FW	Josh Windass	0	1	0	0	0	0	0	1
10	MF	Barry Bannan	9	0	0	0	1	0	10	0
22	DF	Moses Odubajo	5	0	0	0	1	0	6	0
2	DF	Liam Palmer	5	0	0	0	0	0	5	0
5	FW	Callum Paterson	5	0	0	0	0	0	5	0
21	MF	Massimo Luongo	5	0	0	0	0	0	5	0
6	MF	Sam Hutchinson	4	0	0	0	0	0	4	0
8	MF	Joey Pelupessy	3	0	0	0	1	0	4	0
19	DF	Osaze Urhoghide	4	0	0	0	0	0	4	0
11	MF	Adam Reach	2	0	0	0	1	0	3	0
23	DF	Chey Dunkley	2	0	0	0	0	0	2	0
28	GK	Joe Wildsmith	2	0	0	0	0	0	2	0
45	FW	Elias Kachunga	2	0	0	0	0	0	2	0
14	DF	Matt Penney	1	0	0	0	0	0	1	0
24	MF	Izzy Brown	1	0	0	0	0	0	1	0
29	MF	Alex Hunt	0	0	0	0	1	0	1	0

=== Clean sheets ===
As of 8 May 2021

No.	Nat.	Player	Matches played	Clean sheet %	League	FA Cup	League Cup	TOTAL
1	(Republic of Ireland)	Keiren Westwood	20	30%	6	0	0	6
25	(England)	Cameron Dawson	9	44.44%	3	0	1	4
28	(England)	Joe Wildsmith	23	30.43%	5	1	1	7

== Awards ==
=== Player of the Month ===
Player of the Month awards for the 2020–21 season.

Month	First	Second	Third	Ref.
September	(England) Josh Windass	(Australia) Massimo Luongo	Not awarded	
October	Not awarded			
November	(Germany) Julian Börner	(Scotland) Barry Bannan & (England) Joe Wildsmith	Not awarded	
December	(England) Chey Dunkley	(England) Liam Shaw	(England) Tom Lees	
January	(Scotland) Callum Paterson	Not awarded		
February	(England) Osaze Urhoghide	Not awarded		
March	(Scotland) Jordan Rhodes	(England) Osaze Urhoghide	(Netherlands) Joey Pelupessy	

=== Player of the Year ===
Player of the Year award for the 2020–21 season.

Winner	Ref
(Scotland) Barry Bannan	
