= David Agbontohoma =

English footballer (born 2001)

Personal information
- Full name: David Osaretin Agbontohoma
- Date of birth: 30 September 2001 (age 25)
- Place of birth: Southwark, England
- Height: 6 ft 3 in (1.91 m)
- Position: Centre-back

Youth career
- Arsenal
- 2018–2021: Southampton

Senior career*
| Years | Team | Apps | (Gls) |
| 2021–2023 | Sheffield Wednesday | 0 | (0) |
| 2023 | → Boreham Wood (loan) | 3 | (0) |
| 2023–2025 | Boreham Wood | 61 | (2) |
| 2025–2026 | Maidstone United | 19 | (1) |
- * Club domestic league appearances and goals as of 16:19, 1 May 2026 (UTC)

David Osaretin Agbontohoma (born 30 September 2001) is an English professional footballer who plays as a centre-back.

== Career ==
=== Early career ===
Having played youth football for Arsenal, Agbontohoma joined Southampton in summer 2018, where he agreed a two-year scholarship deal. Agbontohoma signed a one-year professional contract with Southampton in August 2020.

=== Sheffield Wednesday ===
Agbontohoma joined Sheffield Wednesday following a trial on 1 July 2021. He made his debut against Harrogate Town in the EFL Trophy on 9 November 2021. On 20 July 2022, it was confirmed that Agbontohoma had extended his stay at the club.

=== Boreham Wood ===
On 6 January 2023, Agbontohoma joined Boreham Wood on a one-month loan. He made his debut the day later against Accrington Stanley in the FA Cup the following day playing the full 90 minutes. His loan was turned permanent on 2 February 2023. He was released from the club in May 2025.

=== Maidstone United ===
On 8 July 2025, Agbontohoma joined National League South side Maidstone United. He departed the club at the end of the 2025–26 season.

== Career statistics ==
As of end of 2025–26 season

Appearances and goals by club, season and competition
| Club | Season | League | | | FA Cup | | League Cup | | Other | | Total | |
| Club | Season | Division | Apps | Goals | Apps | Goals | Apps | Goals | Apps | Goals | Apps | Goals |
|---|---|---|---|---|---|---|---|---|---|---|---|---|
| Southampton U21 | 2019–20 | Premier League 2, Division 2 | — | | | | | | 1 (Note: Appearance(s) in the EFL Trophy.) | 0 | 1 | 0 |
| Southampton U21 | 2020–21 | Premier League 2, Division 2 | — | | | | | | 2 | 0 | 2 | 0 |
| Southampton U21 | Total | | 0 | 0 | 0 | 0 | 0 | 0 | 3 | 0 | 3 | 0 |
| Sheffield Wednesday | 2021–22 | League One | 0 | 0 | 0 | 0 | 0 | 0 | 2 | 0 | 2 | 0 |
| Sheffield Wednesday | 2022–23 | League One | 0 | 0 | 0 | 0 | 0 | 0 | 2 | 0 | 2 | 0 |
| Sheffield Wednesday | Total | | 0 | 0 | 0 | 0 | 0 | 0 | 4 | 0 | 4 | 0 |
| Boreham Wood (loan) | 2022–23 | National League | 3 | 0 | 2 | 0 | 0 | 0 | 0 | 0 | 5 | 0 |
| Boreham Wood | 2022–23 | National League | 20 | 0 | 0 | 0 | 0 | 0 | 1 (Note: Appearance(s) in the National League Playoffs.) | 0 | 21 | 0 |
| Boreham Wood | 2023–24 | National League | 21 | 1 | 0 | 0 | 0 | 0 | 0 | 0 | 21 | 1 |
| Boreham Wood | 2024–25 | National League South | 20 | 1 | 1 | 0 | 0 | 0 | 2 (Note: Appearance(s) in FA Trophy) | 0 | 23 | 1 |
| Boreham Wood | Total | | 61 | 2 | 1 | 0 | 0 | 0 | 3 | 0 | 65 | 2 |
| Maidstone United | 2025–26 | National League South | 19 | 1 | 0 | 0 | 0 | 0 | 0 | 0 | 19 | 1 |
| Career total | | | 83 | 3 | 3 | 0 | 0 | 0 | 10 | 0 | 96 | 3 |
