= Sam Durrant =

Association football player (born 2002)

Personal information
- Full name: Samuel Joseph David Durrant
- Date of birth: 16 February 2002 (age 24)
- Place of birth: Liverpool, England
- Height: 5 ft 10 in (1.78 m)
- Position: Winger

Team information
- Current team: Enosis Neon Paralimni

Youth career
- Everton
- Liverpool
- 2018–2022: Blackburn Rovers

Senior career*
| Years | Team | Apps | (Gls) |
| 2021–2022 | Blackburn Rovers | 0 | (0) |
| 2022–2023 | Sheffield Wednesday | 1 | (0) |
| 2023–2024 | Dundalk | 28 | (2) |
| 2025 | Connah's Quay Nomads | 7 | (2) |
| 2025–2026 | Karvan | 26 | (0) |
| 2026– | Enosis Neon Paralimni | 0 | (0) |

International career^{‡}
| 2024– | Sri Lanka | 19 | (1) |
- * Club domestic league appearances and goals as of 31 May 2026 (UTC) ‡ National team caps and goals as of 19:30, 5 October 2026 (UTC)

Samuel Joseph David Durrant (born 16 February 2002) is a professional footballer who plays as a winger for Enosis Neon Paralimni. Born in England, he plays for the Sri Lanka national team.

Sam is the first Sri Lankan Tamil descent footballer to play professionally in England.

== Personal life ==
Sam Durrant was born in England to an English father and Sri Lankan Tamil mother.

== Club career ==
=== Early career ===
Durrant played for both Everton and Liverpool youth teams. He joined Blackburn Rovers on 29 June 2018 on a two-year scholarship, plus a one-year professional contract. He signed an additional one-year contract until 2022 on 9 July 2021. He was released by Blackburn Rovers in their retained list on 20 May 2022.

=== Sheffield Wednesday ===
He joined Sheffield Wednesday on 24 June 2022, joining the clubs under-21 side. He made the first team squad against Oxford United on 7 April before making his Wednesday debut against Derby County on the final day of the season coming off the bench for Fisayo Dele-Bashiru. Following promotion back to the EFL Championship it was confirmed that Durrant would be released following the end of his contract.

=== Dundalk ===
On 2 August 2023, he signed for League of Ireland Premier Division club Dundalk. He extended his stay at the club for another year on 4 December 2023. It was confirmed he was leaving the club on 7 November 2024.

=== Connah's Quay Nomads ===
On 4 February 2025, Durrant signed for Cymru Premier club Connah's Quay Nomads.

=== Karvan FK ===
On 26 July 2025, Durrant joined Azerbaijan Premier League side Karvan.

On 25 July 2026, Durrant joined Cypriot Second Division side Enosis Neon Paralimni.

== International career ==
In March 2024, he received his first call up to the Sri Lanka national team training camp, which he qualifies for through his Sri Lankan Tamil mother. On 31 August 2024, he received a call-up from the Sri Lanka national team to face Cambodia in the 2027 AFC Asian Cup qualification – play-off round.

== Career statistics ==
=== Club ===
As of match played on 15 September 2024

Appearances and goals by club, season and competition
| Club | Season | League | | | National Cup | | League Cup | | Other | | Total | |
| Club | Season | Division | Apps | Goals | Apps | Goals | Apps | Goals | Apps | Goals | Apps | Goals |
|---|---|---|---|---|---|---|---|---|---|---|---|---|
| Sheffield Wednesday | 2022–23 | League One | 1 | 0 | 0 | 0 | 0 | 0 | 0 | 0 | 1 | 0 |
| Dundalk | 2023 | LOI Premier Division | 10 | 2 | 2 | 0 | – | | 0 | 0 | 12 | 2 |
| Dundalk | 2024 | LOI Premier Division | 18 | 0 | 2 | 0 | – | | 0 | 0 | 20 | 0 |
| Dundalk | Total | | 28 | 2 | 4 | 0 | – | | 0 | 0 | 32 | 2 |
| Connah's Quay Nomads | 2024–25 | Cymru Premier | 0 | 0 | 0 | 0 | – | | – | | 0 | 0 |
| Career total | | | 29 | 2 | 4 | 0 | 0 | 0 | 0 | 0 | 32 | 2 |

=== International ===
As of 5 October 2026

Appearances and goals by national team and year
| National team | Year | Apps | Goals |
|---|---|---|---|
| Sri Lanka | 2024 | 6 | 0 |
| Sri Lanka | 2024 | 9 | 0 |
| Sri Lanka | 2024 | 5 | 1 |
| Total | | 19 | 1 |

Scores and results list Sri Lanka's goal tally first, score column indicates score after each Durrant goal

List of international goals scored by Sam Durrant
| No. | Date | Venue | Opponent | Score | Result | Competition |
|---|---|---|---|---|---|---|
| 1 | 5 October 2026 | Côte d'Or National Sports Complex, Saint Pierre, Mauritius | Mauritius | 3–1 | 3–2 | Friendly |
