= 2022–23 Sheffield Wednesday F.C. season =

English football club season

Sheffield Wednesday
2022–23 season
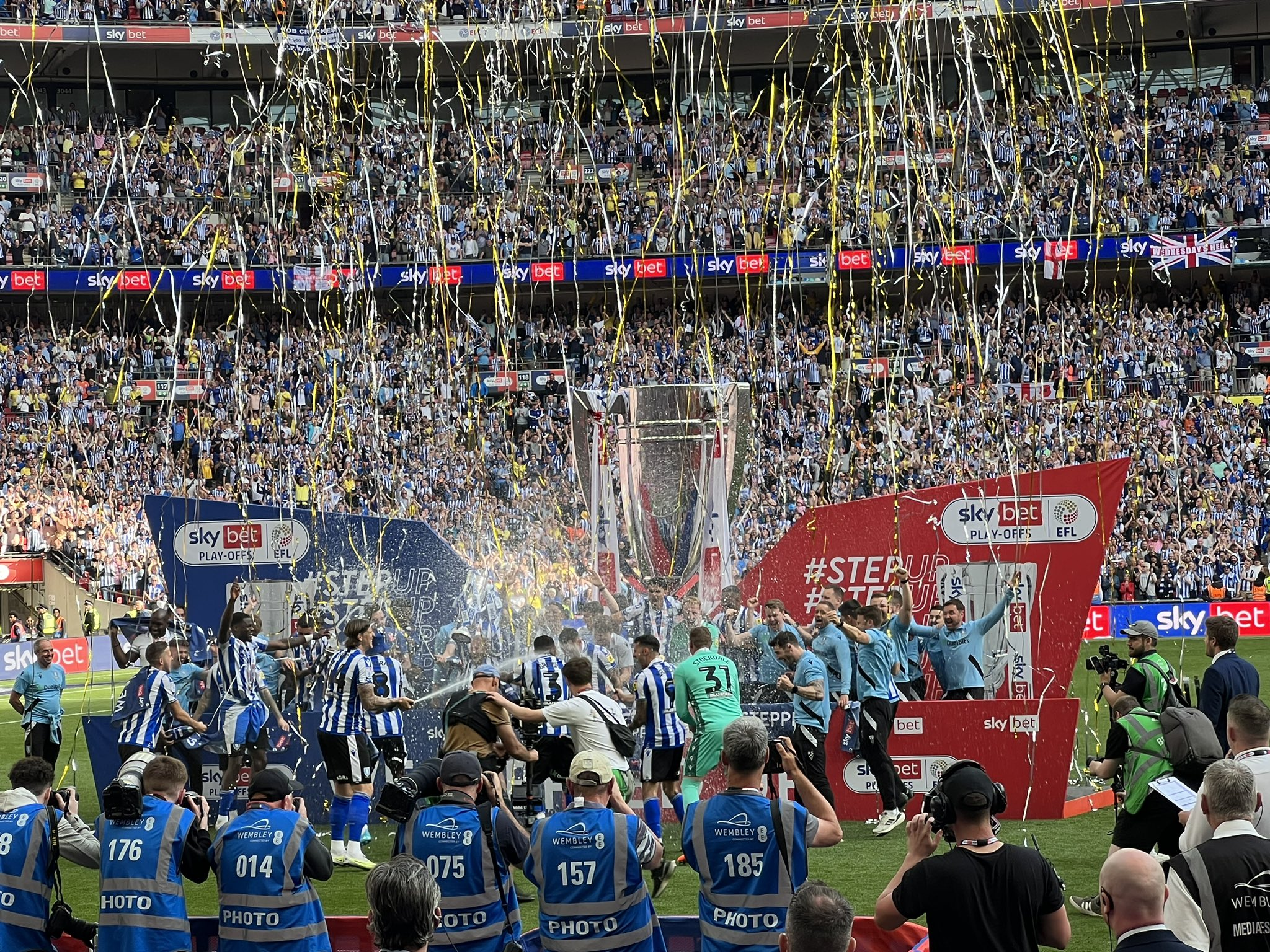
- Wednesday players lift the trophy and celebrate after being promoted to the Championship in the play-off final.
- Owner: Dejphon Chansiri
- Manager: Darren Moore
- Stadium: Hillsborough Stadium
- League One: 3rd
- Play-offs: Winners (promoted)
- FA Cup: Fourth round (vs. Fleetwood Town)
- EFL Cup: Third round (vs. Southampton)
- EFL Trophy: Group stage
- Top goalscorer: League: Michael Smith (17); All: Michael Smith (21)
- Highest home attendance: 33,442 (vs Plymouth Argyle; League One)
- Lowest home attendance: 3,173 (vs Leicester City U21; EFL Trophy)
- Average home league attendance: 25,378
- Biggest win: 5–0 (vs Forest Green Rovers & Cambridge United; League One)
- Biggest defeat: 4–0 (vs Peterborough United; League One Playoffs)
| Home colours | Away colours | Third colours |

The 2022–23 season was the 155th season in the existence of Sheffield Wednesday and the club's second consecutive season in League One. In addition to the league, they also competed in the 2022–23 FA Cup, the 2022–23 EFL Cup and the 2022–23 EFL Trophy.

== Season overview ==
=== June ===
On 20 June, the players reported back to pre-season training.

=== July ===
On 2 July, the club announced that manager Darren Moore would miss the first pre-season friendly against Alfreton Town due to recent knee surgery.

On 12 July, the club unveiled their new kits for the 2022–23 season.

On 12 July, the club announced their new shirt sponsor Host & Stay Limited.

On 19 July, the club announced their first-team squad numbers for the 2022–23 season.

=== September ===
On 9 September, the fixture against Plymouth Argyle was postponed following the passing of Queen Elizabeth II.

On 16 September, Mark McGuinness was called up to the Republic of Ireland U21 squad.

On 30 September, James Shan joined the clubs coaching staff.

=== January ===
On 20 January, manager Darren Moore confirmed that ex-loan star, Michael Hector was currently on trial at the club.

=== February ===
On 14 February, following their 3–0 victory against Morecambe, the club broke their record for most clean sheets during a single league campaign breaking the previous record of 17.

On 24 February, Marvin Johnson was given a three-match suspension for violent conduct for an incident during the game against Ipswich Town.

On 25 February, following their 1–0 victory against Charlton Athletic, the club broke their unbeaten league record, breaking the previous record of 19 games unbeaten.

=== March ===
On 16 March, Pierce Charles was called up to the Northern Ireland U19 squad for their upcoming fixtures.

=== April ===
On 19 April, Liam Palmer was awarded the Wise Old Owls Player of the Season award.

On 23 April, Barry Bannan and Josh Windass were both included into the EFL League One Team of the Season.

On 30 April, Liam Palmer was named Player of the Season, Players player of the Season, and a Lifetime Achievement award, whilst Will Vaulks won Community Player of the Season and Goal of the Season at the club's end of season awards.

=== May ===
On 3 May, the clubs academy retained list was published.

On 7 May, the club finished the season breaking another club record of 96 points. This was the fourth club record to be broken after a new clean sheet record (24), unbeaten run (23) and most away wins (12) during a league season.

On 12 May, the club faced Peterborough United at London Road Stadium in the first leg of the League One play-offs, where they would lose 4–0. On 18 May, they faced off again in the second leg at Hillsborough Stadium. In one of the most dramatic play-off matches in history, Sheffield Wednesday overturned their 4–0 deficit and scored four goals, taking the match into extra time. The game would finish 5–1 (5–5 on aggregate), meaning penalties would decide who would go through to the final. Wednesday would win the shoot-out 5–3.

On 29 May, Sheffield Wednesday faced Barnsley in the League One play-off final. The match nearly went to penalties until where Josh Windass scored a last-minute winner in extra time to promote Wednesday back to the EFL Championship.

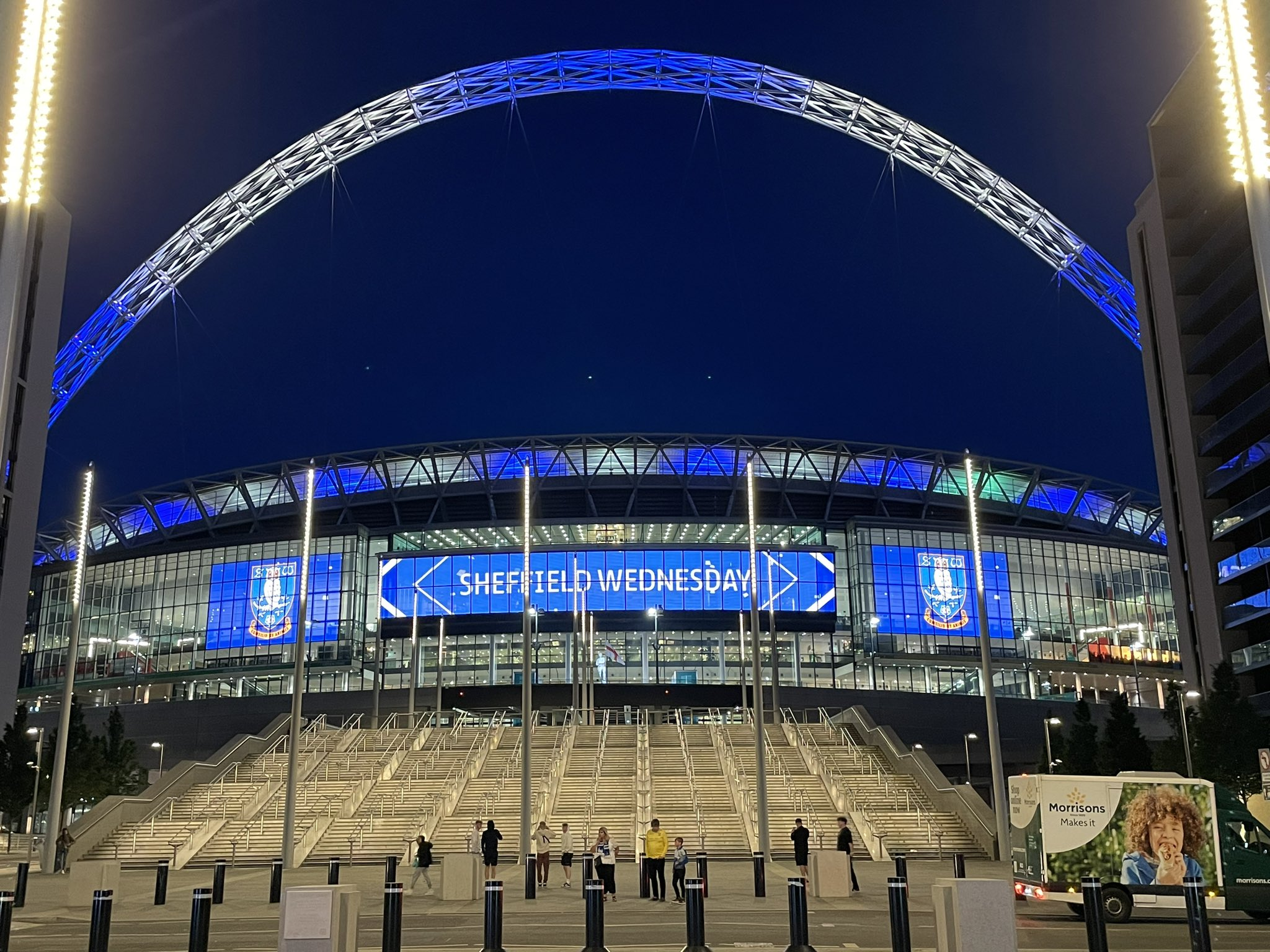
Wembley Stadium in London lights up blue and white to celebrate Sheffield Wednesday's promotion.

== Pre-season ==
On 8 June, Wednesday announced their first pre-season friendly against Harrogate Town before heading off to Portugal for a warm weather training camp. On 13 June, the club announced that a Wednesday XI made up of U23 and U18 players will face Wakefield. On 16 June, a friendly against Alfreton Town was announced. Additional friendlies against Wigan Athletic and Rayo Vallecano were announced on 1 July. A behind-closed-doors friendly against Bournemouth during their pre-season trip to Portugal was announced on 2 July.

| 2 July 2022 Friendly | Alfreton Town | 0–0 | Sheffield Wednesday | Alfreton |
| 15:00 BST | | Report | | Stadium: Impact Arena; Attendance: 1,946 |

| 8 July 2022 Friendly | Harrogate Town | 0–2 | Sheffield Wednesday | Harrogate |
| 19:00 BST | | Report | Windass 9'; Smith 32' (pen.) | Stadium: EnviroVent Stadium; Attendance: 1,901 |

| 14 July 2022 Friendly | Wakefield | 2–1 | Sheffield Wednesday XI | Featherstone |
| 19:30 BST | Woodward 20'; Morrison 34' | Report | Dunn 30' | Stadium: Millennium Stadium; Attendance: 504 |

| 15 July 2022 Friendly | Bournemouth | 2–1 | Sheffield Wednesday | Portugal |
| 17:30 BST | Cook 45'; Solanke 56' | Report | Dele-Bashiru 79' | Attendance: 0 (Played behind closed doors) |

| 20 July 2022 Friendly | Sheffield Wednesday | 0–2 | Rayo Vallecano | Sheffield |
| 19:00 BST | | Report | J. Hunt 29' (o.g.); Nteka 59' | Stadium: Hillsborough Stadium; Attendance: 4,697; Referee: Craig Pawson |

| 23 July 2022 Friendly | Wigan Athletic | 4–1 | Sheffield Wednesday | Wigan |
| 15:00 BST | McClean 23'; Naylor 51'; Magennis 80'; Aasgaard 89' | Report | Heneghan 6' | Stadium: DW Stadium |

| 26 July 2022 Friendly | Stocksbridge Park Steels | 2–2 | Sheffield Wednesday XI | Stocksbridge |
| 19:30 BST | Goodwin 8'; McKenzie-Grey 65' | Report | Ashman 12'; Trialist 32' | Stadium: Bracken Moor |

== Competitions ==
=== League One ===
==== League table ====
| Pos | Team | Pld | W | D | L | GF | GA | GD | Pts | Promotion, qualification or relegation |
|---|---|---|---|---|---|---|---|---|---|---|
| 1 | Plymouth Argyle (C, P) | 46 | 31 | 8 | 7 | 82 | 47 | +35 | 101 | Promotion to EFL Championship |
| 2 | Ipswich Town (P) | 46 | 28 | 14 | 4 | 101 | 35 | +66 | 98 | Promotion to EFL Championship |
| 3 | Sheffield Wednesday (O, P) | 46 | 28 | 12 | 6 | 81 | 37 | +44 | 96 | Qualification for League One play-offs |
| 4 | Barnsley | 46 | 26 | 8 | 12 | 80 | 47 | +33 | 86 | Qualification for League One play-offs |
| 5 | Bolton Wanderers | 46 | 23 | 12 | 11 | 62 | 36 | +26 | 81 | Qualification for League One play-offs |
| 6 | Peterborough United | 46 | 24 | 5 | 17 | 75 | 54 | +21 | 77 | Qualification for League One play-offs |

Source: EFL Official Website
Rules for classification: 1) Points; 2) Goal difference; 3) Number of goals scored; 4) Head-to-head results; 5) Wins; 6) Away goals; 7) Penalty points (sec 9.5); 8) 12-point sending off offences
(C) Champions; (O) Play-off winners; (P) Promoted

==== Results summary ====
| Overall | | | | | | | | Home | | | | | | Away | | | | | |
| Pld | W | D | L | GF | GA | GD | Pts | W | D | L | GF | GA | GD | W | D | L | GF | GA | GD |
|---|---|---|---|---|---|---|---|---|---|---|---|---|---|---|---|---|---|---|---|
| 46 | 28 | 12 | 6 | 81 | 37 | +44 | 96 | 16 | 6 | 1 | 49 | 16 | +33 | 12 | 6 | 5 | 32 | 21 | +11 |

Last updated: 7 May 2023.
Source: [Soccerway]

==== Results by round ====
| Round | 1 | 2 | 3 | 4 | 5 | 6 | 7 | 8 | 9 | 10 | 11 | 12 | 13 | 14 | 15 | 16 | 17 | 18 | 19 | 20 | 21 | 22 | 23 | 24 | 25 | 26 | 27 | 28 | 29 | 30 | 31 | 32 | 33 | 34 | 35 | 36 | 37 | 38 | 39 | 40 | 41 | 42 | 43 | 44 | 45 | 46 |
|---|---|---|---|---|---|---|---|---|---|---|---|---|---|---|---|---|---|---|---|---|---|---|---|---|---|---|---|---|---|---|---|---|---|---|---|---|---|---|---|---|---|---|---|---|---|---|
| Ground | H | A | H | A | A | H | H | A | H | H | A | A | H | A | A | H | H | A | H | A | A | H | A | H | H | A | H | H | A | H | H | A | H | A | H | A | A | A | H | A | H | A | A | H | A | H |
| Result | D | W | W | L | W | W | L | W | D | W | W | L | W | W | D | D | W | W | W | D | D | D | W | W | W | W | W | W | D | W | W | W | W | W | D | L | L | D | D | D | W | L | W | W | W | W |
| Position | 9 | 4 | 2 | 8 | 4 | 3 | 4 | 4 | 4 | 4 | 3 | 3 | 3 | 3 | 3 | 3 | 3 | 3 | 3 | 3 | 3 | 3 | 3 | 3 | 2 | 2 | 2 | 1 | 2 | 2 | 1 | 1 | 1 | 1 | 1 | 2 | 2 | 2 | 1 | 3 | 1 | 3 | 3 | 3 | 3 | 3 |

Updated to match(es) played on 7 May 2023. Source: [Soccerway]
A = Away; H = Home; W = Win; D = Draw; L = Loss; P = Postponed

==== Matches ====
On Thursday, 23 June 2022, the EFL League One fixtures were revealed.

| 30 July 2022 1 | Sheffield Wednesday | 3–3 | Portsmouth | Sheffield |
| 15:00 BST | Johnson 8'; Windass (yellow card) 13'; Byers (yellow card) 49'; Dele-Bashiru 52', 81'; Gregory (yellow card) 82' (yellow-red card) 90+3'; Ihiekwe (yellow card) 90+1'; Stockdale (yellow card) 90+3' | Report | Ogilvie 50'; Jacobs 57'; Bishop 64' | Stadium: Hillsborough; Attendance: 26,901; Referee: Seb Stockbridge |

| 6 August 2022 2 | Milton Keynes Dons | 0–1 | Sheffield Wednesday | Denbigh |
| 15:00 BST | | Report | Windass 22' (pen.); Ihiekwe (yellow card) 45+2'; Bannan (yellow card) 67'; Paterson (yellow card) 76'; Dele-Bashiru (yellow card) 80' | Stadium: Stadium MK; Attendance: 13,241; Referee: Anthony Backhouse |

| 13 August 2022 3 | Sheffield Wednesday | 1–0 | Charlton Athletic | Sheffield |
| 15:00 BST | Bakinson 81'; Sow (yellow card) 83' | Report | Clare (yellow card) 69' | Stadium: Hillsborough; Attendance: 22,363; Referee: Bobby Madden |

| 16 August 2022 4 | Peterborough United | 2–0 | Sheffield Wednesday | Peterborough |
| 19:45 BST | Kent (yellow card) 38'; Clarke-Harris 65'; Taylor 75' | Report | James (red card) 34'; Vaulks (yellow card) 51'; Ihiekwe (yellow card) 61' | Stadium: Weston Homes Stadium; Attendance: 11,169; Referee: James Oldham |

| 20 August 2022 5 | Bolton Wanderers | 0–2 | Sheffield Wednesday | Horwich |
| 15:00 BST | Bradley (yellow card) 71'; Sadlier (yellow card) 90+4' | Report | Byers 36'; Palmer 38'; Adeniran (yellow card) 90+2' | Stadium: University of Bolton Stadium; Attendance: 22,023; Referee: Charles Breakspear |

| 27 August 2022 6 | Sheffield Wednesday | 5–0 | Forest Green Rovers | Sheffield |
| 15:00 BST | Windass 12'; Bannan 19'; Palmer 31'; Johnson (yellow card) 37'; Gregory 45+1'; Bernard 56' (o.g.) | Report | O'Keeffe (yellow card) 37'; Cargill (yellow card) 73'; Davis (yellow card) 85' | Stadium: Hillsborough; Attendance: 22,300; Referee: Simon Mather |

| 3 September 2022 7 | Sheffield Wednesday | 0–2 | Barnsley | Sheffield |
| 15:00 BST | Ihiekwe (yellow card) 79'; Smith (yellow card) 81' | Report | Connell (yellow card) 18'; Cole 34'; Thomas (yellow card) 69'; Norwood 74', (yellow card) 82'; Wolfe (yellow card) 80' | Stadium: Hillsborough; Attendance: 27,939; Referee: Josh Smith |

| 13 September 2022 8 | Morecambe | 0–3 | Sheffield Wednesday | Morecambe |
| 19:45 BST | | Report | McGuinness (yellow card) 38'; Windass 70'; Byers 78'; Smith 83' | Stadium: Mazuma Stadium; Attendance: 5,148; Referee: Andrew Kitchen |

| 17 September 2022 9 | Sheffield Wednesday | 2–2 | Ipswich Town | Sheffield |
| 15:00 BST | Bannan (yellow card) 24'; Byers 75'; James (yellow card) 79'; Smith 89' | Report | Jackson 4'; Woolfenden (yellow card) 43'; Davis (yellow card) 52'; Leigh (yellow card) 62'; Iorfa 71' (o.g.); Burns (yellow card) 74'; Morsy (yellow card) 76'; Harness (yellow card) 82' | Stadium: Hillsborough; Attendance: 26,281; Referee: Peter Wright |

| 24 September 2022 10 | Sheffield Wednesday | 3–1 | Wycombe Wanderers | Sheffield |
| 15:00 BST | Jacobson 1' (o.g.); Bannan 32'; Paterson 90+6' | Report | Vokes 10'; Mawson (yellow card) 67'; Grimmer (yellow card) 85' | Stadium: Hillsborough; Attendance: 22,123; Referee: Matt Donohue |

| 1 October 2022 11 | Port Vale | 0–1 | Sheffield Wednesday | Stoke-on-Trent |
| 15:00 BST | Conlon (yellow card) 22'; Jones (yellow card) 31'; Harrison (yellow card) 61' | Report | Vaulks 63'; Paterson (yellow card) 79' | Stadium: Vale Park; Attendance: 11,336; Referee: Christopher Pollard |

| 4 October 2022 12 | Plymouth Argyle | 2–1 | Sheffield Wednesday | Plymouth |
| 19:45 BST | Hardie 3'; Edwards (yellow card) 41'; Lonwijk (yellow card) 50'; Cosgrove 90+1' | Report | Palmer 7'; Windass (yellow card) 73' | Stadium: Home Park; Attendance: 16,381; Referee: Andy Davies |

| 8 October 2022 13 | Sheffield Wednesday | 3–0 | Cheltenham Town | Sheffield |
| 15:00 BST | Windass 3'; Bannan 83'; Dele-Bashiru 85' | Report | Freestone (yellow card) 58'; Nlundulu (yellow card) 67'; Perry (yellow card) 74'; Long (yellow card) 88' | Stadium: Hillsborough; Attendance: 22,375; Referee: Ben Speedie |

| 15 October 2022 14 | Cambridge United | 0–2 | Sheffield Wednesday | Cambridge |
| 15:00 BST | Taylor (yellow card) 42' | Report | Gregory 6', 77' (yellow card) 64'; Smith (yellow card) 25'; Vaulks (yellow card) 66' | Stadium: Abbey Stadium; Attendance: 6,418; Referee: Carl Boyeson |

| 22 October 2022 15 | Lincoln City | 1–1 | Sheffield Wednesday | Lincoln |
| 15:00 BST | Virtue (yellow card) 21'; Mandroiu 46' (yellow card) 59' | Report | Gregory 7'; McGuinness (yellow card) 79'; Byers (yellow card) 88' | Stadium: LNER Stadium; Attendance: 10,152; Referee: Alan Young |

| 26 October 2022 16 | Sheffield Wednesday | 1–1 | Bristol Rovers | Sheffield |
| 20:00 BST | Ihiekwe (yellow card) 36'; Smith 45+3' | Report | Rossiter (yellow card) 39'; Coburn 60' | Stadium: Hillsborough; Attendance: 22,006; Referee: Oliver Langford |
Note: Live on Sky Sports

| 29 October 2022 17 | Sheffield Wednesday | 4–2 | Burton Albion | Sheffield |
| 15:00 BST | Bannan 22'; Smith 26' (pen.); Wilks 53'; Dele-Bashiru 75'; Gregory (penalty missed) 80' | Report | Winnall 76'; Hamer 82' | Stadium: Hillsborough; Attendance: 23,692; Referee: David Rock |

| 12 November 2022 18 | Accrington Stanley | 0–1 | Sheffield Wednesday | Accrington |
| 15:00 GMT | | Report | Mighten 24'; Ihiekwe (yellow card) 33'; James (yellow card) 66'; Vaulks (yellow card) 89' | Stadium: Crown Ground; Attendance: 4,938; Referee: Charles Breakspear |

| 19 November 2022 19 | Sheffield Wednesday | 1–0 | Shrewsbury Town | Sheffield |
| 15:00 GMT | McGuinness 39'; Wilks (yellow card) 90+4' | Report | Pyke (yellow card) 82' | Stadium: Hillsborough; Attendance: 24,271; Referee: Andy Woolmer |

| 3 December 2022 20 | Derby County | 0–0 | Sheffield Wednesday | Derby |
| 12:30 GMT | Dobbin (yellow card) 52'; Bird (yellow card) 64' | Report | | Stadium: Pride Park Stadium; Attendance: 28,192; Referee: Dean Whitestone |

| 10 December 2022 21 | Exeter City | 1–1 | Sheffield Wednesday | Exeter |
| 15:00 GMT | Key (yellow card) 43'; Caprice 56'; Brown (yellow card) 69'; Stansfield (yellow card) 71'; Dieng (yellow card) 76' | Report | McGuinness (yellow card) 73'; Paterson 90+4' | Stadium: St James Park; Attendance: 7,591; Referee: Neil Hair |

| 17 December 2022 22 | Sheffield Wednesday | 0–0 | Oxford United | Sheffield |
| 15:00 GMT | Paterson (yellow card) 27'; Bakinson (yellow card) 30'; Gregory (yellow card) 65' | Report | Bate (yellow card) 29'; Murphy (penalty missed) 90+6' | Stadium: Hillsborough; Attendance: 22,285; Referee: Seb Stockbridge |

| 26 December 2022 23 | Fleetwood Town | 1–2 | Sheffield Wednesday | Fleetwood |
| 15:00 GMT | Rooney 8' (yellow card) 35' (yellow-red card) 83'; Vela (yellow card) 12' | Report | Byers 16'; McGuinness (yellow card) 45+1'; Johnson 73'; Paterson (yellow card) 90+3' | Stadium: Highbury Stadium; Attendance: 4,389; Referee: Darren Handley |

| 29 December 2022 24 | Sheffield Wednesday | 2–0 | Port Vale | Sheffield |
| 19:45 GMT | Smith 30' (pen.), 70'; Johnson (yellow card) 67' | Report | Garrity (yellow card) 39'; Jones (yellow card) 57' | Stadium: Hillsborough; Attendance: 26,021; Referee: Darren Drysdale |

| 2 January 2023 25 | Sheffield Wednesday | 5–0 | Cambridge United | Sheffield |
| 15:00 GMT | Windass 7', 70', 80'; Smith 21' (pen.), 51' | Report | Bennett (yellow card) 20' | Stadium: Hillsborough; Attendance: 24,221; Referee: Andy Haines |

| 14 January 2023 26 | Wycombe Wanderers | 0–1 | Sheffield Wednesday | High Wycombe |
| 15:00 GMT | McCarthy (yellow card) 90+1' | Report | Vaulks 13'; Windass (yellow card) 72' | Stadium: Adams Park; Attendance: 8,302; Referee: Sam Allison |

| 21 January 2023 27 | Sheffield Wednesday | 1–0 | Fleetwood Town | Sheffield |
| 15:00 GMT | Johnson 17'; Palmer (yellow card) 86'; Gregory (penalty missed) 90+5' | Report | Vela (yellow card) 57'; Lynch (yellow card) 90+4' | Stadium: Hillsborough; Attendance: 23,230; Referee: Simon Mather |

| 4 February 2023 28 | Sheffield Wednesday | 1–0 | Plymouth Argyle | Sheffield |
| 15:00 GMT | Paterson 7' (yellow card) 54'; Byers (yellow card) 45+2'; Bannan (yellow card) 60' | Report | Edwards (yellow card) 30' | Stadium: Hillsborough; Attendance: 33,442; Referee: John Busby |

| 11 February 2023 29 | Ipswich Town | 2–2 | Sheffield Wednesday | Ipswich |
| 15:00 GMT | Chaplin (penalty missed) 19'; Broadhead 43'; Davis 50' | Report | Smith 27'; Vaulks (yellow card) 33'; Byers 34' (yellow card) 50' | Stadium: Portman Road; Attendance: 29,072; Referee: Geoff Eltringham |

| 14 February 2023 30 | Sheffield Wednesday | 3–0 | Morecambe | Sheffield |
| 19:45 GMT | Bannan 1' (yellow card) 36'; Windass 22', 87' | Report | Simeu (yellow card) 10'; Gibson (yellow card) 64' | Stadium: Hillsborough; Attendance: 21,330; Referee: Robert Lewis |

| 18 February 2023 31 | Sheffield Wednesday | 5–2 | Milton Keynes Dons | Sheffield |
| 15:00 GMT | Windass 9'; Smith 54' (pen.), 74'; Gregory 64'; Byers 89' | Report | Leko 2'; McEachran (yellow card) 18'; Eisa 24' | Stadium: Hillsborough; Attendance: 24,318; Referee: Scott Oldham |

| 25 February 2023 32 | Charlton Athletic | 0–1 | Sheffield Wednesday | Charlton, London |
| 15:00 GMT | Blackett-Taylor (yellow card) 31' | Report | Palmer 9' (yellow card) 19'; Smith (yellow card) 38'; Iorfa (yellow card) 40'; Dawson (yellow card) 56' | Stadium: The Valley; Attendance: 16,729; Referee: Ben Speedie |

| 4 March 2023 33 | Sheffield Wednesday | 1–0 | Peterborough United | Sheffield |
| 15:00 GMT | Flint (yellow card) 34'; Bannan (yellow card) 40'; Thompson 60' (o.g.); Gregory (yellow card) 90' | Report | Edwards (yellow card) 89' | Stadium: Hillsborough; Attendance: 26,984; Referee: Anthony Backhouse |

| 11 March 2023 34 | Portsmouth | 0–1 | Sheffield Wednesday | Portsmouth |
| 15:00 GMT | Morrell (yellow card) 41'; Raggett (yellow card) 87' | Report | Windass 11' (yellow card) 41'; Brown (yellow card) 43'; Iorfa (yellow card) 54' (yellow-red card) 78' | Stadium: Fratton Park; Attendance: 18,910; Referee: Ben Toner |

| 17 March 2023 35 | Sheffield Wednesday | 1–1 | Bolton Wanderers | Sheffield |
| 19:45 GMT | Gregory 11'; Bannan (yellow card) 77' | Report | Adeboyejo 36'; Santos (yellow card) 69' | Stadium: Hillsborough; Attendance: 29,230; Referee: Sam Purkiss |

| 21 March 2023 36 | Barnsley | 4–2 | Sheffield Wednesday | Barnsley |
| 20:00 GMT | Cole 10'; Norwood 12' (yellow card) 62'; Phillips (yellow card) 48'; Williams (yellow card) 57'; Andersen (yellow card) 81'; Watters 83'; Kitching 90+6' | Report | Gregory 33', 74' (yellow card) 89'; Smith (yellow card) 35' | Stadium: Oakwell; Attendance: 18,377; Referee: Ross Joyce |
Note: Live on Sky Sports

| 26 March 2023 37 | Forest Green Rovers | 1–0 | Sheffield Wednesday | Nailsworth |
| 13:00 GMT | Garrick 35'; Bunker (yellow card) 67' | Report | James (yellow card) 48' | Stadium: The Bolt New Lawn; Attendance: 3,837; Referee: David Rock |
Note: Live on Sky Sports

| 29 March 2023 38 | Cheltenham Town | 2–2 | Sheffield Wednesday | Cheltenham |
| 19:45 GMT | Taylor (yellow card) 45'; Broom (yellow card) 52'; Keena 62'; May 69' | Report | Palmer (yellow card) 39'; Flint 76'; Gregory 87' | Stadium: Completely-Suzuki Stadium; Attendance: 5,433; Referee: Paul Howard |

| 1 April 2023 39 | Sheffield Wednesday | 1–1 | Lincoln City | Sheffield |
| 15:00 GMT | Smith 12' | Report | Mandroiu 28' | Stadium: Hillsborough; Attendance: 27,903; Referee: Bobby Madden |

| 7 April 2023 40 | Oxford United | 1–1 | Sheffield Wednesday | Littlemore |
| 15:00 GMT | McGuane (yellow card) 64'; Brannagan 70' (pen.); O'Donkor (yellow card) 89' | Report | Vaulks (yellow card) 27'; Bannan 35'; Famewo (yellow card) 37' | Stadium: Kassam Stadium; Attendance: 10,238; Referee: Rebecca Welch |
Note: Live on Sky Sports

| 10 April 2023 41 | Sheffield Wednesday | 3–0 | Accrington Stanley | Sheffield |
| 15:00 GMT | Adeniran 11', 46'; Palmer 72' | Report | Rodgers (yellow card) 16'; Hamilton (yellow card) 65' | Stadium: Hillsborough; Attendance: 25,025; Referee: Neil Hair |

| 15 April 2023 42 | Burton Albion | 3–2 | Sheffield Wednesday | Burton upon Trent |
| 15:00 GMT | Brayford 21'; Hughes (yellow card) 24'; Helm 34', 37' | Report | Paterson 28'; Smith 85' (pen.) | Stadium: Pirelli Stadium; Attendance: 4,682; Referee: Will Finnie |

| 18 April 2023 43 | Bristol Rovers | 1–2 | Sheffield Wednesday | Bristol |
| 19:45 GMT | Collins 46' | Report | Smith (yellow card) 15'; Bannan 28'; Famewo 41'; Vaulks (yellow card) 52'; Palmer (yellow card) 88' | Stadium: Memorial Ground; Attendance: 8,724; Referee: Josh Smith |

| 22 April 2023 44 | Sheffield Wednesday | 2–1 | Exeter City | Sheffield |
| 15:00 GMT | Gregory 59'; Paterson 74' (yellow card) 80'; Palmer (yellow card) 78'; Vaulks (yellow card) 90+2' | Report | Key 47'; Caprice (yellow card) 64' | Stadium: Hillsborough; Attendance: 26,046; Referee: Declan Bourne |

| 29 April 2023 45 | Shrewsbury Town | 0–3 | Sheffield Wednesday | Shrewsbury |
| 15:00 GMT | Bennett (yellow card) 57'; Flannagan (yellow card) 81'; Dunkley (yellow card) 86' | Report | Smith 8', 48', 81'; Palmer (yellow card) 73'; Johnson (yellow card) 74' | Stadium: Montgomery Waters Meadow; Attendance: 8,457; Referee: Dean Whitestone |

| 7 May 2023 46 | Sheffield Wednesday | 1–0 | Derby County | Sheffield |
| 12:00 GMT | Smith 43' (pen.); Brown (yellow card) 61'; Palmer (yellow card) 74'; Johnson (yellow card) 90+1' | Report | Davies (red card) 41'; Roberts (yellow card) 43'; Smith (yellow card) 77' | Stadium: Hillsborough; Attendance: 33,413; Referee: Leigh Doughty |
Note: Live on Sky Sports

==== Play-offs ====
Sheffield Wednesday finished 3rd in the regular 2022–23 EFL League One season, so were drawn against 6th placed Peterborough United in the Play-off Semi Final. The first leg took place at the Weston Homes Stadium and the second leg took place at Hillsborough.

===== Semi-finals =====
| 12 May 2023 First leg | Peterborough United | 4–0 | Sheffield Wednesday | Peterborough |
| 20:00 BST | Kent (yellow card) 15'; Taylor 20'; Ward 36'; Poku 50' (yellow card) 64'; Clarke-Harris 82' | Report | Flint (yellow card) 54'; Ihiekwe (yellow card) 55' | Stadium: Weston Homes Stadium; Attendance: 12,965; Referee: Anthony Backhouse |
Note: Live on Sky Sports

| 18 May 2023 Second leg | Sheffield Wednesday | 5–1 (5–5 agg.) (5–3 p) | Peterborough United | Sheffield |
| 20:00 BST | Palmer (yellow card) 6'; Smith 9' (pen.); Gregory 25'; Bannan (yellow card) 47'; James 71'; Palmer 90+8'; Ihiekwe (yellow card) 99'; Paterson 112'; Hunt (yellow card) 120' | Report | Kyprianou (yellow card) 16'; Butler (yellow card) 71'; Taylor (yellow card) 87'; Gregory 105' (o.g.) | Stadium: Hillsborough Stadium; Attendance: 31,835; Referee: David Webb |
| | Penalties |
| | Smith (penalty scored); Vaulks (penalty scored); Bannan (penalty scored); Windass (penalty scored); Hunt (penalty scored) | | (penalty scored) Clarke-Harris; (penalty missed) Butler; (penalty scored) Norburn; (penalty scored) Tshimanga |
Note: Live on Sky Sports

===== Final =====
| 29 May 2023 Final | Sheffield Wednesday | 1–0 | Barnsley | Wembley |
| 15:00 BST | Windass 120+3' | Report | Phillips (red card) 49'; Thomas (yellow card) 95' | Stadium: Wembley Stadium; Attendance: 72,492; Referee: Tim Robinson |
Note: Live on Sky Sports

=== FA Cup ===
Sheffield Wednesday were drawn at home to Morecambe in the first round and to Mansfield Town in the second round. On 28 November 2022, Sheffield Wednesday were drawn against Newcastle United in the third round. On 8 January 2023, Sheffield Wednesday were drawn at home to Fleetwood Town in the fourth round.

| 4 November 2022 First round | Sheffield Wednesday | 2–0 | Morecambe | Sheffield |
| 19:45 GMT | Windass 29'; Mighten 65'; Johnson (yellow card) 90' | Report | Weir (yellow card) 32' | Stadium: Hillsborough; Attendance: 8,558; Referee: Sunny Gill |

| 26 November 2022 Second round | Sheffield Wednesday | 2–1 | Mansfield Town | Sheffield |
| 15:00 GMT | Smith 78', 83' | Report | Lapslie 34'; Gordon (yellow card) 64' | Stadium: Hillsborough; Attendance: 13,932; Referee: Ollie Yates |

| 7 January 2023 Third round | Sheffield Wednesday | 2–1 | Newcastle United | Sheffield |
| 18:00 GMT | Dele-Bashiru (yellow card) 45+1'; Windass 52', 65' | Report | Guimarães 69' | Stadium: Hillsborough; Attendance: 25,884; Referee: Michael Salisbury |
Note: Live on BBC

| 28 January 2023 Fourth round | Sheffield Wednesday | 1–1 | Fleetwood Town | Sheffield |
| 15:00 GMT | Vaulks (yellow card) 34'; Earl 71' (o.g.) | Report | Rooney (yellow card) 27'; Omochere 52' (yellow card) 53'; Lane (yellow card) 86'; Robertson (yellow card) 89' | Stadium: Hillsborough; Attendance: 15,743; Referee: Charles Breakspear |

| 7 February 2023 Fourth round replay | Fleetwood Town | 1–0 | Sheffield Wednesday | Fleetwood |
| 19:45 GMT | Mendes Gomes (yellow card) 45', (goal) 60'; Omochere (yellow card) 81'; Hayes (yellow card) 84' | Report | Adeniran (yellow card) 29'; Gregory (yellow card) 42'; Brown (yellow card) 53'; Hunt (yellow card) 67' | Stadium: Highbury Stadium; Attendance: 2,936; Referee: Darren Bond |

=== EFL Cup ===
Wednesday were drawn against Sunderland in the first round on 23 June 2022. The second round draw took place on 10 August 2022 by Clinton Morrison and Michael Gray in which Wednesday were drawn against Rochdale. The third round draw took place on 24 August 2022 and Sheffield Wednesday were drawn against Southampton.

| 10 August 2022 First round | Sheffield Wednesday | 2–0 | Sunderland | Sheffield |
| 19:45 BST | Adeniran 16'; Sow 56'; Bakinson (yellow card) 68' | Report | Winchester (yellow card) 11' | Stadium: Hillsborough; Attendance: 8,412; Referee: Tom Reeves |
Note: Live on Sky Sports

| 23 August 2022 Second round | Sheffield Wednesday | 3–0 | Rochdale | Sheffield |
| 19:30 BST | Brown 23'; Dele-Bashiru 36'; Adeniran 44'; Glover (yellow card) 57'; Vaulks (yellow card) 80' | Report | Seriki (yellow card) 66'; Rodney (yellow card) 80' | Stadium: Hillsborough; Attendance: 9,045; Referee: Ben Toner |

| 9 November 2022 Third round | Southampton | 1–1 (6–5 p) | Sheffield Wednesday | Southampton |
| 19:45 GMT | Ward-Prowse 45+2' (pen.); Perraud (yellow card) 83' | Report | Windass 24'; Paterson (yellow card) 27' | Stadium: St Mary's Stadium; Attendance: 20,457; Referee: John Brooks |
| | Penalties |
| | Ward-Prowse (penalty scored); Elyounoussi (penalty scored); Diallo (penalty scored); Maitland-Niles (penalty scored); Armstrong (penalty scored); Walcott (penalty scored) | | Smith (penalty scored); Bannan (penalty scored); Johnson (penalty scored); Vaulks (penalty scored); Gregory (penalty scored); Iorfa (penalty missed) |

=== EFL Trophy ===
The Owls were drawn into Group H of the Northern section alongside Bradford City, Burton Albion and Leicester City U21.

| Pos | Div | Team | Pld | W | PW | PL | L | GF | GA | GD | Pts | Qualification |
|---|---|---|---|---|---|---|---|---|---|---|---|---|
| 1 | L1 | Burton Albion | 3 | 3 | 0 | 0 | 0 | 11 | 4 | +7 | 9 | Advance to Round 2 |
| 2 | L2 | Bradford City | 3 | 1 | 0 | 1 | 1 | 5 | 7 | −2 | 4 | Advance to Round 2 |
| 3 | L1 | Sheffield Wednesday | 3 | 1 | 0 | 0 | 2 | 5 | 6 | −1 | 3 | |
| 4 | ACA | Leicester City U21 | 3 | 0 | 1 | 0 | 2 | 4 | 8 | −4 | 2 | |

Source: EFL.com

| 30 August 2022 Group Game 1 | Bradford City | 3–1 | Sheffield Wednesday | Bradford |
| 19:30 BST | Young 36', 75'; Harratt 83' | Report | Smith 38' (pen.) | Stadium: University of Bradford Stadium; Attendance: 6,092; Referee: Sam Barrott |

| 20 September 2022 Group Game 2 | Sheffield Wednesday | 2–3 | Burton Albion | Sheffield |
| 19:00 BST | Bakinson (yellow card) 24'; Wilks 32'; Paterson 34' | Report | Winnall 8'; Smith 17'; Hamer (yellow card) 30'; Keillor-Dunn 51' (pen.); Butcher (yellow card) 64'; Adeboyejo (yellow card) 90+3' | Stadium: Hillsborough; Attendance: 4,577; Referee: Thomas Parsons |

| 18 October 2022 Group Game 3 | Sheffield Wednesday | 2–0 | Leicester City U21 | Sheffield |
| 19:00 BST | Paterson 8'; Trueman 52' | Report | Maswanhise (penalty missed) 66' | Stadium: Hillsborough; Attendance: 3,173; Referee: Marc Edwards |

== Transfers and contracts ==
=== In ===
| Date | Pos | Player | Transferred from | Fee | Ref |
|---|---|---|---|---|---|
| 1 July 2022 (Note: The transfer was announced on 24 June, and would become official on 1 July, once his Ramsgate contract expired) | CM | (England) Bobby Dunn | (England) Ramsgate | Free transfer | |
| 1 July 2022 (Note: The transfer was announced on 24 June, and would become official on 1 July, once his Blackburn Rovers contract expired) | RW | (England) Sam Durrant | (England) Blackburn Rovers | Free transfer | |
| 1 July 2022 (Note: The transfer was announced on 14 June, and would become official on 1 July, once his AFC Wimbledon contract expired) | CB | (England) Ben Heneghan | (England) AFC Wimbledon | Free transfer | |
| 1 July 2022 (Note: The transfer was announced on 22 June, and would become official on 1 July, once his Rotherham United contract expired) | CB | (England) Michael Ihiekwe | (England) Rotherham United | Free transfer | |
| 1 July 2022 (Note: The transfer was announced on 22 June, and would become official on 1 July, once his Rotherham United contract expired) | CF | (England) Michael Smith | (England) Rotherham United | Free transfer | |
| 1 July 2022 (Note: The transfer was announced on 15 June, and would become official on 1 July, once his Wycombe Wanderers contract expired) | GK | (England) David Stockdale | (England) Wycombe Wanderers | Free transfer | |
| 1 July 2022 (Note: The transfer was announced on 21 June, and would become official on 1 July, once his Cardiff City contract expired) | CM | (Wales) Will Vaulks | (Wales) Cardiff City | Free transfer | |
| 6 July 2022 | CB | (England) Akin Famewo | (England) Norwich City | Undisclosed | |
| 21 July 2022 | CM | (England) Tyreeq Bakinson | (England) Bristol City | Undisclosed | |
| 4 August 2022 | CB | (Republic of Ireland) Adam Alimi-Adetoro | (Republic of Ireland) Athlone Town | Free transfer | |
| 4 August 2022 | CF | (England) Luke Cook | (England) Enfield Town | Free transfer | |
| 22 August 2022 | CF | (England) Mallik Wilks | (England) Hull City | Undisclosed | |
| 30 January 2023 | LW | (England) Favour Onukwuli | (England) Volenti Academy | Undisclosed | |

=== Out ===
| Date | Pos | Player | Transferred to | Fee | Ref. |
|---|---|---|---|---|---|
| 30 June 2022 | CF | (Burundi) Saido Berahino | (Cyprus) AEL Limassol | Released | |
| 30 June 2022 | RB | (England) Kwame Boateng | (England) Guiseley | Released | |
| 30 June 2022 | CF | (England) Alex Bonnington | (United States) Duke Blue Devils | Released | |
| 30 June 2022 | RB | (England) Josh Dawodu | (England) Hendon | Released | |
| 30 June 2022 | CB | (England) Chey Dunkley | (England) Shrewsbury Town | Released | |
| 30 June 2022 | AM | (England) Lewis Farmer | (England) Workington | Released | |
| 30 June 2022 | RW | (England) Charles Hagan | (England) Wycombe Wanderers | Released | |
| 30 June 2022 | DM | (England) Sam Hutchinson | (England) Reading | Released | |
| 30 June 2022 | CM | (England) Caelan Kilheeney | (England) Glossop North End | Released | |
| 30 June 2022 | CM | (Australia) Massimo Luongo | (England) Middlesbrough | Rejected contract | |
| 30 June 2022 | RW | (England) Nathaniel Mendez-Laing | (England) Derby County | Rejected contract | |
| 30 June 2022 | AM | (England) Jayden Onen | (United States) Forward Madison | Released | |
| 30 June 2022 | GK | (England) Joshua Render | (Australia) Olympic FC | Released | |
| 30 June 2022 | RB | (England) Declan Thompson | (England) Ilkeston Town | Released | |
| 30 June 2022 | CM | (England) Liam Waldock | (England) Gainsborough Trinity | Released | |
| 30 June 2022 | GK | (England) Joe Wildsmith | (England) Derby County | Rejected contract | |
| 30 June 2022 | FW | (England) Basile Zottos | (England) Ossett United | Released | |
| 10 August 2022 | MF | (England) Isaac Holland | (England) Brentford | Undisclosed | |
| 10 August 2022 | MF | (England) Tony Yogane | (England) Brentford | Undisclosed | |
| 27 August 2022 | FW | (Netherlands) Sylla Sow | (Netherlands) De Graafschap | Undisclosed | |
| 1 September 2022 | CM | (England) Alex Hunt | (England) Grimsby Town | Undisclosed | |
| 2 February 2023 | CB | (England) David Agbontohoma | (England) Boreham Wood | Undisclosed | |
| 23 March 2023 | CM | (England) Bobby Dunn | (England) Dartford | Undisclosed | |

=== Loans in ===
| Date | Pos | Player | Loaned from | Until | Ref. |
|---|---|---|---|---|---|
| 7 July 2022 | LB | (England) Reece James | (England) Blackpool | End of Season | |
| 18 August 2022 | CB | (Republic of Ireland) Mark McGuinness | (Wales) Cardiff City | 19 January 2023 (Note: Mark McGuinness was recalled from his loan on 19 January 2023.) | |
| 29 August 2022 | LW | (England) Alex Mighten | (England) Nottingham Forest | 10 January 2023 (Note: Alex Mighten was recalled from his loan on 10 January 2023.) | |
| 27 January 2023 | CB | (England) Aden Flint | (England) Stoke City | End of Season | |

=== Loans out ===
| Date | Pos | Player | Loaned to | Until | Ref. |
|---|---|---|---|---|---|
| 1 July 2022 | CB | (Republic of Ireland) Ciaran Brennan | (England) Swindon Town | End of season | |
| 13 September 2022 | LB | (England) Ryan Galvin | (England) Maidstone United | End of season (Note: Ryan Gavin’s loan was extended by further months on 11 November 2022, the 16 December 2022, before extending until the end of season on 13 January 2023) | |
| 26 November 2022 | GK | (England) Luke Jackson | (England) Matlock Town | 26 December 2022 | |
| 2 December 2022 | CM | (England) Jay Glover | (England) Belper Town | 2 January 2023 | |
| 2 December 2022 | WB | (Portugal) Paulo Aguas | (England) Belper Town | 2 January 2023 | |
| 9 December 2022 | CM | (England) Will Trueman | (England) Mickleover | End of season (Note: Will Trueman’s loan was extended) | |
| 5 January 2023 | CM | (England) Jay Glover | (England) Gainsborough Trinity | 5 April 2023 | |
| 6 January 2023 | CB | (England) David Agbontohoma | (England) Boreham Wood | 2 February 2023 (Note: David Agbontohoma's loan was turned permanent on 2 February 2023.) | |
| 3 February 2023 | GK | (England) Luke Jackson | (England) Hednesford Town | 18 March 2023 (Note: Luke Jackson was recalled from his loan on 18 March.) | |

=== Contracts ===
| Date | Pos | Player | Length | Expiry | Ref |
|---|---|---|---|---|---|
| 8 June 2022 | CF | (England) Bailey Cadamarteri | — | — | |
| 17 June 2022 | RB | (England) Jack Hunt | — | — | |
| 24 June 2022 | CB | (England) Josh Ashman | — | — | |
| 24 June 2022 | LB | (England) Fuad Sesay | — | — | |
| 20 July 2022 | CB | (England) David Agbontohoma | — | — | |
| 14 October 2022 | GK | (Northern Ireland) Pierce Charles | — | — | |
| 9 December 2022 | CM | (England) Sean Fusire | — | — | |
| 14 December 2022 | CM | (England) Rio Shipston | — | — | |
| 24 March 2023 | CM | (Scotland) Barry Bannan | — | — | |

== Squad statistics ==
=== Appearances ===
As of 29 May 2023

| No. | Pos | Nat | Player | Total | | League One | | Play-offs | | FA Cup | | EFL Cup | | EFL Trophy | |
| No. | Pos | Nat | Player | Apps | Goals | Apps | Goals | Apps | Goals | Apps | Goals | Apps | Goals | Apps | Goals |
|---|---|---|---|---|---|---|---|---|---|---|---|---|---|---|---|
| 2 | DF | (Scotland) SCO | Liam Palmer | 52 | 6 | 43+1 | 5 | 3 | 1 | 4 | 0 | 1 | 0 | 0 | 0 |
| 3 | DF | (England) ENG | Jaden Brown | 16 | 1 | 6+3 | 0 | 0+1 | 0 | 1 | 0 | 2 | 1 | 3 | 0 |
| 4 | MF | (Wales) WAL | Will Vaulks | 54 | 2 | 34+9 | 2 | 1+2 | 0 | 4 | 0 | 1+1 | 0 | 2 | 0 |
| 5 | DF | (England) ENG | Ben Heneghan | 13 | 0 | 10 | 0 | 0 | 0 | 0 | 0 | 2 | 0 | 1 | 0 |
| 6 | DF | (England) ENG | Dominic Iorfa | 45 | 0 | 27+5 | 0 | 3 | 0 | 3+2 | 0 | 3 | 0 | 2 | 0 |
| 7 | FW | (England) ENG | Mallik Wilks | 24 | 2 | 5+11 | 1 | 0 | 0 | 4+1 | 0 | 0 | 0 | 2+1 | 1 |
| 8 | MF | (England) ENG | Dennis Adeniran | 28 | 4 | 9+13 | 2 | 0+1 | 0 | 2+1 | 0 | 2 | 2 | 0 | 0 |
| 9 | FW | (England) ENG | Lee Gregory | 47 | 11 | 25+13 | 10 | 2+1 | 1 | 2+1 | 0 | 2 | 0 | 1 | 0 |
| 10 | MF | (Scotland) SCO | Barry Bannan | 48 | 7 | 41 | 7 | 3 | 0 | 1+1 | 0 | 1 | 0 | 0+1 | 0 |
| 11 | FW | (England) ENG | Josh Windass | 42 | 16 | 30+4 | 11 | 3 | 1 | 3+1 | 3 | 1 | 1 | 0 | 0 |
| 12 | FW | (England) ENG | Leojo Davidson | 2 | 0 | 0 | 0 | 0 | 0 | 0 | 0 | 0 | 0 | 1+1 | 0 |
| 13 | FW | (Scotland) SCO | Callum Paterson | 38 | 8 | 13+12 | 5 | 3 | 1 | 2+2 | 0 | 3 | 0 | 3 | 2 |
| 14 | MF | (Scotland) SCO | George Byers | 29 | 6 | 19+5 | 6 | 0 | 0 | 1+2 | 0 | 1+1 | 0 | 0 | 0 |
| 15 | DF | (England) ENG | Akin Famewo | 19 | 1 | 15+2 | 1 | 0 | 0 | 2 | 0 | 0 | 0 | 0 | 0 |
| 17 | MF | (England) ENG | Fisayo Dele-Bashiru | 41 | 5 | 12+21 | 4 | 0+1 | 0 | 3+1 | 0 | 2 | 1 | 0+1 | 0 |
| 18 | MF | (England) ENG | Marvin Johnson | 51 | 3 | 38+3 | 3 | 3 | 0 | 3+1 | 0 | 1+1 | 0 | 0+1 | 0 |
| 19 | MF | (England) ENG | Tyreeq Bakinson | 32 | 1 | 13+13 | 1 | 0 | 0 | 2+1 | 0 | 2 | 0 | 1 | 0 |
| 20 | DF | (England) ENG | Michael Ihiekwe | 28 | 0 | 19+1 | 0 | 3 | 0 | 1+1 | 0 | 1+2 | 0 | 0 | 0 |
| 22 | MF | (England) ENG | Rio Shipston | 4 | 0 | 0+3 | 0 | 0 | 0 | 0 | 0 | 0 | 0 | 0+1 | 0 |
| 23 | MF | (England) ENG | Jay Glover | 3 | 0 | 0 | 0 | 0 | 0 | 0 | 0 | 1 | 0 | 1+1 | 0 |
| 24 | FW | (England) ENG | Michael Smith | 49 | 21 | 34+5 | 17 | 3 | 1 | 3+2 | 2 | 0+1 | 0 | 1 | 1 |
| 25 | GK | (England) ENG | Cameron Dawson | 33 | 0 | 22 | 0 | 3 | 0 | 3 | 0 | 2 | 0 | 3 | 0 |
| 27 | DF | (England) ENG | Ryan Galvin | 2 | 0 | 0 | 0 | 0 | 0 | 0 | 0 | 0+1 | 0 | 0+1 | 0 |
| 29 | FW | (England) ENG | Bailey Cadamarteri | 1 | 0 | 0 | 0 | 0 | 0 | 0 | 0 | 0 | 0 | 0+1 | 0 |
| 30 | DF | (England) ENG | Sean Fusire | 1 | 0 | 0 | 0 | 0 | 0 | 1 | 0 | 0 | 0 | 0 | 0 |
| 31 | GK | (England) ENG | David Stockdale | 27 | 0 | 24 | 0 | 0 | 0 | 2 | 0 | 1 | 0 | 0 | 0 |
| 32 | DF | (England) ENG | Jack Hunt | 26 | 0 | 7+9 | 0 | 0+2 | 0 | 4+1 | 0 | 0 | 0 | 3 | 0 |
| 33 | DF | (England) ENG | Reece James | 34 | 1 | 22+3 | 0 | 2+1 | 1 | 2 | 0 | 1+1 | 0 | 1+1 | 0 |
| 34 | FW | (England) ENG | Sam Durrant | 1 | 0 | 0+1 | 0 | 0 | 0 | 0 | 0 | 0 | 0 | 0 | 0 |
| 35 | FW | (England) ENG | Luke Cook | 1 | 0 | 0 | 0 | 0 | 0 | 0 | 0 | 0+1 | 0 | 0 | 0 |
| 37 | DF | (Republic of Ireland) IRL | Adam Alimi-Adetoro | 1 | 0 | 0 | 0 | 0 | 0 | 0+1 | 0 | 0 | 0 | 0 | 0 |
| 38 | MF | (England) ENG | Will Trueman | 1 | 1 | 0 | 0 | 0 | 0 | 0 | 0 | 0 | 0 | 1 | 1 |
| 43 | DF | (Brazil) BRA | Paulo Aguas | 1 | 0 | 0 | 0 | 0 | 0 | 0 | 0 | 0 | 0 | 0+1 | 0 |
| 44 | DF | (England) ENG | Aden Flint | 21 | 1 | 16+2 | 1 | 1+1 | 0 | 0+1 | 0 | 0 | 0 | 0 | 0 |
Players that left the club mid-season:
| 16 | DF | (England) ENG | David Agbontohoma | 2 | 0 | 0 | 0 | 0 | 0 | 0 | 0 | 0 | 0 | 2 | 0 |
| 29 | MF | (England) ENG | Alex Hunt | 3 | 0 | 0 | 0 | 0 | 0 | 0 | 0 | 0+2 | 0 | 1 | 0 |
| 34 | DF | (Republic of Ireland) IRL | Mark McGuinness | 24 | 1 | 15+2 | 1 | 0 | 0 | 2+1 | 0 | 2 | 0 | 1+1 | 0 |
| 40 | FW | (Netherlands) NED | Sylla Sow | 4 | 1 | 0+2 | 0 | 0 | 0 | 0 | 0 | 1+1 | 1 | 0 | 0 |
| 45 | FW | (England) ENG | Alex Mighten | 14 | 2 | 7+2 | 1 | 0 | 0 | 2 | 1 | 0 | 0 | 3 | 0 |

=== Goalscorers ===
As of 29 May 2023

Includes all competitive matches.

| Rank | Pos. | Nat. | No. | Player | League One | Playoffs | FA Cup | EFL Cup | EFL Trophy | Total |
|---|---|---|---|---|---|---|---|---|---|---|
| 1 | FW | (England) | 24 | Michael Smith | 17 | 1 | 2 | 0 | 1 | 21 |
| 2 | FW | (England) | 11 | Josh Windass | 11 | 1 | 3 | 1 | 0 | 16 |
| 3 | FW | (England) | 9 | Lee Gregory | 10 | 1 | 0 | 0 | 0 | 11 |
| 4 | FW | (Scotland) | 13 | Callum Paterson | 5 | 1 | 0 | 0 | 2 | 8 |
| 5 | MF | (Scotland) | 10 | Barry Bannan | 7 | 0 | 0 | 0 | 0 | 7 |
| 6 | DF | (Scotland) | 2 | Liam Palmer | 5 | 1 | 0 | 0 | 0 | 6 |
| 6 | MF | (Scotland) | 14 | George Byers | 6 | 0 | 0 | 0 | 0 | 6 |
| 7 | MF | (England) | 17 | Fisayo Dele-Bashiru | 4 | 0 | 0 | 1 | 0 | 5 |
| 8 | MF | (England) | 8 | Dennis Adeniran | 2 | 0 | 0 | 2 | 0 | 4 |
| 9 | MF | (England) | 18 | Marvin Johnson | 3 | 0 | 0 | 0 | 0 | 3 |
| 10 | MF | (Wales) | 4 | Will Vaulks | 2 | 0 | 0 | 0 | 0 | 2 |
| 10 | FW | (England) | 7 | Mallik Wilks | 1 | 0 | 0 | 0 | 1 | 2 |
| 10 | FW | (England) | 45 | Alex Mighten | 1 | 0 | 1 | 0 | 0 | 2 |
| 11 | DF | (England) | 3 | Jaden Brown | 0 | 0 | 0 | 1 | 0 | 1 |
| 11 | DF | (England) | 15 | Akin Famewo | 1 | 0 | 0 | 0 | 0 | 1 |
| 11 | MF | (England) | 19 | Tyreeq Bakinson | 1 | 0 | 0 | 0 | 0 | 1 |
| 11 | DF | (England) | 33 | Reece James | 0 | 1 | 0 | 0 | 0 | 1 |
| 11 | DF | (Republic of Ireland) | 34 | Mark McGuinness | 1 | 0 | 0 | 0 | 0 | 1 |
| 11 | MF | (England) | 38 | Will Trueman | 0 | 0 | 0 | 0 | 1 | 1 |
| 11 | FW | (Netherlands) | 40 | Sylla Sow | 0 | 0 | 0 | 1 | 0 | 1 |
| 11 | DF | (England) | 44 | Aden Flint | 1 | 0 | 0 | 0 | 0 | 1 |
| 11 | Own goals | | | | 3 | 0 | 1 | 0 | 0 | 4 |
| 11 | Total | | | | 80 | 6 | 7 | 6 | 5 | 104 |

=== Disciplinary record ===
As of 29 May 2023

| No. | Pos. | Name | League One | | Playoffs | | FA Cup | | EFL Cup | | EFL Trophy | | Total | |
| No. | Pos. | Name | Booked | Sent off (straight red) | Booked | Sent off (straight red) | Booked | Sent off (straight red) | Booked | Sent off (straight red) | Booked | Sent off (straight red) | Booked | Sent off (straight red) |
|---|---|---|---|---|---|---|---|---|---|---|---|---|---|---|
| 9 | FW | Lee Gregory | 5 | 1 | 0 | 0 | 1 | 0 | 0 | 0 | 0 | 0 | 6 | 1 |
| 33 | DF | Reece James | 3 | 1 | 0 | 0 | 0 | 0 | 0 | 0 | 0 | 0 | 3 | 1 |
| 6 | DF | Dominic Iorfa | 2 | 1 | 0 | 0 | 0 | 0 | 0 | 0 | 0 | 0 | 2 | 1 |
| 2 | DF | Liam Palmer | 8 | 0 | 1 | 0 | 0 | 0 | 0 | 0 | 0 | 0 | 9 | 0 |
| 4 | MF | Will Vaulks | 7 | 0 | 0 | 0 | 1 | 0 | 1 | 0 | 0 | 0 | 9 | 0 |
| 20 | DF | Michael Ihiekwe | 6 | 0 | 2 | 0 | 0 | 0 | 0 | 0 | 0 | 0 | 8 | 0 |
| 10 | MF | Barry Bannan | 6 | 0 | 1 | 0 | 0 | 0 | 0 | 0 | 0 | 0 | 7 | 0 |
| 13 | FW | Callum Paterson | 6 | 0 | 0 | 0 | 0 | 0 | 1 | 0 | 0 | 0 | 7 | 0 |
| 18 | MF | Marvin Johnson | 4 | 0 | 0 | 0 | 1 | 0 | 0 | 0 | 0 | 0 | 5 | 0 |
| 24 | FW | Michael Smith | 5 | 0 | 0 | 0 | 0 | 0 | 0 | 0 | 0 | 0 | 5 | 0 |
| 11 | FW | Josh Windass | 4 | 0 | 0 | 0 | 0 | 0 | 0 | 0 | 0 | 0 | 4 | 0 |
| 14 | MF | George Byers | 4 | 0 | 0 | 0 | 0 | 0 | 0 | 0 | 0 | 0 | 4 | 0 |
| 34 | DF | Mark McGuinness | 4 | 0 | 0 | 0 | 0 | 0 | 0 | 0 | 0 | 0 | 4 | 0 |
| 3 | DF | Jaden Brown | 2 | 0 | 0 | 0 | 1 | 0 | 0 | 0 | 0 | 0 | 3 | 0 |
| 19 | MF | Tyreeq Bakinson | 1 | 0 | 0 | 0 | 0 | 0 | 1 | 0 | 1 | 0 | 3 | 0 |
| 8 | MF | Dennis Adeniran | 1 | 0 | 0 | 0 | 1 | 0 | 0 | 0 | 0 | 0 | 2 | 0 |
| 17 | MF | Fisayo Dele-Bashiru | 1 | 0 | 0 | 0 | 1 | 0 | 0 | 0 | 0 | 0 | 2 | 0 |
| 32 | DF | Jack Hunt | 0 | 0 | 1 | 0 | 1 | 0 | 0 | 0 | 0 | 0 | 2 | 0 |
| 44 | DF | Aden Flint | 1 | 0 | 1 | 0 | 0 | 0 | 0 | 0 | 0 | 0 | 2 | 0 |
| 7 | FW | Mallik Wilks | 1 | 0 | 0 | 0 | 0 | 0 | 0 | 0 | 0 | 0 | 1 | 0 |
| 15 | DF | Akin Famewo | 1 | 0 | 0 | 0 | 0 | 0 | 0 | 0 | 0 | 0 | 1 | 0 |
| 23 | MF | Jay Glover | 0 | 0 | 0 | 0 | 0 | 0 | 1 | 0 | 0 | 0 | 1 | 0 |
| 25 | GK | Cameron Dawson | 1 | 0 | 0 | 0 | 0 | 0 | 0 | 0 | 0 | 0 | 1 | 0 |
| 31 | GK | David Stockdale | 1 | 0 | 0 | 0 | 0 | 0 | 0 | 0 | 0 | 0 | 1 | 0 |
| 40 | FW | Sylla Sow | 1 | 0 | 0 | 0 | 0 | 0 | 0 | 0 | 0 | 0 | 1 | 0 |

=== Clean sheets ===
As of 29 May 2023

| No. | Nat. | Player | Matches played | Clean sheet % | League One | Playoffs | FA Cup | EFL Cup | EFL Trophy | TOTAL |
|---|---|---|---|---|---|---|---|---|---|---|
| 25 | (England) | Cameron Dawson | 33 | 51.52% | 13 | 1 | 0 | 2 | 1 | 17 |
| 31 | (England) | David Stockdale | 27 | 44.44% | 11 | 0 | 1 | 0 | 0 | 12 |

== Awards ==
=== Club Player of the Month ===
Player of the Month awards for the 2022–23 season.

| Month | Player | % | Ref. |
|---|---|---|---|
| August | (Scotland) Liam Palmer | 80% | |
| September | (England) Michael Smith | 38% | |
| October | (Scotland) Barry Bannan | 55% | |
| November | (Republic of Ireland) Mark McGuinness | 53% | |
| December | (Republic of Ireland) Mark McGuinness | 58% | |
| January | (England) Josh Windass | 33% | |
| February | (Scotland) Liam Palmer | 50% | |
| March | (England) Lee Gregory | – | |

=== Club Player of the Year ===
Player of the Year award for the 2022–23 season.

| Player | Ref. |
|---|---|
| (Scotland) Liam Palmer | |

=== Sky Bet League One Player of the Month ===
| Month | Player | | Ref. |
|---|---|---|---|
| August | (Scotland) Liam Palmer | Winner | |
| October | (Scotland) Barry Bannan | Nomination | |
| December | (England) Cameron Dawson | Nomination | |
| January | (England) Josh Windass | Nomination | |

=== Sky Bet League One Player of the Season ===
| Player | | Ref. |
|---|---|---|
| (Scotland) Barry Bannan | Nomination | |

=== EFL Goal of the Month ===
| Month | Player | Goal | | Ref |
|---|---|---|---|---|
| October | (Scotland) Barry Bannan | 83' vs Cheltenham Town, 8 October | Winner | |

=== EFL Goal of the Season ===
| Player | Goal | | Ref |
|---|---|---|---|
| (Scotland) Barry Bannan | 83' vs Cheltenham Town, 8 October | Nomination | |

=== Sky Bet League One Manager of the Month ===
| Month | Manager | | Ref. |
|---|---|---|---|
| August | (Jamaica) Darren Moore | Nomination | |
| October | (Jamaica) Darren Moore | Nomination | |
| November | (Jamaica) Darren Moore | Nomination | |
| January | (Jamaica) Darren Moore | Nomination | |
| February | (Jamaica) Darren Moore | Nomination | |

=== Sky Bet League One Manager of the Season ===
| Player | | Ref. |
|---|---|---|
| (Jamaica) Darren Moore | Nomination | |

=== EFL League Cup Player of the Round ===
| Round | Player | | Ref. |
|---|---|---|---|
| 2 | (England) Fisayo Dele-Bashiru | Winner | |

=== EFL League Cup Goal of the Round ===
| Round | Player | Goal | | Ref. |
|---|---|---|---|---|
| 1 | (England) Dennis Adeniran | 16' vs Sunderland, 10 August | Winner | |
| 2 | (England) Dennis Adeniran | 44' vs Rochdale, 23 August | Winner | |
