= Buxton F.C. =

Association football club in England

Coordinates: 53°15′24″N 1°54′24″W

Buxton
- Full name: Buxton Football Club
- Nickname: The Bucks
- Founded: 1877
- Ground: The Silverlands, Buxton
- Capacity: 4,000 (490 seated)
- Chairman: David Hopkins
- Manager: Jordan Broadbent
- League: National League North
- 2025–26: National League North, 5th of 24
- Website: buxtonfc.co.uk
Home colours	Away colours

Buxton Football Club is a professional football club based in Buxton, Derbyshire, England. They are currently members of the National League North and play at the Silverlands.

== History ==
The club was established in autumn 1877 as an offshoot of the local cricket club, playing their first match on 27 October 1877. In 1891 they joined the Combination. They finished bottom of the league in 1895–96 and left at the end of the 1898–99 season, when they switched to the Manchester League. They were runners-up in 1904–05 but spent most of the next seven seasons in lower mid-table, finishing second-from-bottom on three occasions, before the league was disbanded in 1912.

Buxton rejoined the Manchester League when it was re-established in 1920, and considered applying to join the new Football League Third Division North when it was formed in 1921, although they did not submit a bid. They were Manchester League runners-up in 1928–29 and 1929–30 and League Cup winners in 1925–26 and 1926–27. After winning the league in 1931–32, they joined the Cheshire County League. After World War II they were runners-up in 1946–47, and in 1951–52 they reached the first round of the FA Cup for the first time. They beat Rawmarsh Welfare 4–1 in the first round and overcame Football League side Aldershot 4–3 at Silverlands in the second, before losing 2–0 at Second Division Doncaster Rovers in the third round.

In 1958–59 Buxton reached the first round of the FA Cup again, and after beating Crook Town 4–1 in the first round, they lost 6–1 at Accrington Stanley in the second. Another first-round appearance in 1962–63 resulted in a 3–1 defeat at Barrow in a replay. The season also saw them finish as runners-up in the Cheshire County League, and they went on to win the league title in 1972–73, earning promotion to the Northern Premier League. When the league gained a second division in 1987, Buxton were placed in the Premier Division, where they remained until finishing bottom in 1996–97, resulting in relegation to Division One. After finishing bottom of Division One the following season, they were relegated to the Premier Division of the Northern Counties East League.

In 2005–06 Buxton won the Northern Counties East League Premier Division, earning promotion back to Division One of the Northern Premier League. The following season saw them crowned champions again, resulting in promotion to the Northern Premier League's Premier Division. They finished fifth in their first season back in the division, qualifying for the promotion play-offs, in which they beat Witton Albion 6–5 on penalties after a 1–1 draw in the semi-finals, before losing the final 2–0 to Gateshead. In 2021–22 the club defeated York City 1–0 in the first round of the FA Cup before losing 1–0 at home to Morecambe of League One. They finished the league season as champions of the Premier Division of the Northern Premier League and were promoted to the National League North.

Buxton reached the second round of the FA Cup again the following season, beating Merthyr Town 2–0 in the first round, before losing 4–0 at Ipswich Town. They also won the Derbyshire Senior Cup, defeating Derby County Academy 2–1 in the final. The club turned fully professional ahead of the 2024–25 season. In 2025–26 they finished fifth in the National League North, going on to beat Scarborough Athletic 4–2 in the play-off quarter-finals, before losing 1–0 to South Shields in the semi-finals.

== Ground ==
Buxton originally played at the Park, a ground shared with the cricket club, and later played at Cote Lane, London Road and Green Lane before moving to the Silverlands in 1884. The site was originally a field owned by the club's first captain, Frank Drewry. The opening match was held on 1 November 1884, a Derbyshire Cup match against Bakewell, which Buxton won 2–0.

Cover was provided for spectators in 1890 (proposals to build a separate pavilion for working-class supporters were not taken forward), at the same time as dressing rooms were built. A wooden stand was erected on one side of the pitch and replaced by the current main stand in 1965, which later had seats from Maine Road added to it. On the opposite side of the pitch is the Popular Side covered terrace. The end behind one goal has a covered terrace, with the other end empty. The ground currently has a capacity of 4,000, of which 490 is seated and 2,500 covered.

The Tarmac Silverlands Stadium (also referred to as the TSS) is the highest football ground in England, at 310 metres (1,020 ft) above sea level.

== Current squad ==
As of 25 June 2026

Note: Flags indicate national team as defined under FIFA eligibility rules; some limited exceptions apply. Players may hold more than one non-FIFA nationality.

No.	Pos.	Nation	Player
1	GK	WAL	Logan Stretch (on loan from Sheffield Wednesday)
2	MF	ENG	Will Trueman
5	DF	ENG	George Ward
6	DF	ENG	Kieran Burton
7	FW	ENG	Johnny Johnston
8	MF	ENG	Connor Kirby (captain)
10	MF	ENG	Cian Coleman
11	FW	ENG	Luke Brennan
14	MF	BER	Keziah Martin

No.	Pos.	Nation	Player
16	MF	ENG	Ashton Mee
19	FW	ENG	Sam Tomlinson
20	FW	ENG	Tai Sodje
22	DF	ENG	Max Bardell
26	MF	IRL	Zak Gilsenan (on loan from Grimsby Town)
27	DF	ENG	Sammy Robinson
28	DF	ENG	Harry Balfe
30	GK	ENG	Logan Melville

== Non-playing staff ==
Position	Name
Manager	Jordan Broadbent
Assistant Manager	Stuart Watkiss
Physio	Dom Lamb
First Team Coach	Jake Loftus
Goalkeeper Coach	Justin Moseley

== Honours ==
NPL Division One trophy, Presidents Cup trophy, NLP Team of the Year 2006–07 and NPL Division One Club of the Month August 2006

- Northern Premier League
  - Premier Division champions 2021–22
  - Division One champions 2006–07
  - President's Cup winners 1981–82, 2006–07
- Northern Counties East League
  - Champions 2005–06
  - President's Cup winners 2004–05, 2005–06
- Cheshire County League
  - Champions 1972–73
  - League Cup winners 1956–57, 1957–58, 1968–69
- Manchester League
  - Champions 1931–32
  - League Cup winners 1925–26, 1926–27
- Derbyshire Senior Cup
  - Winners 1938–39, 1945–46, 1956–57, 1959–60, 1971–72, 1980–81, 1985–86, 1986–87, 2008–09, 2011–12, 2022–23

== Records ==
- Record attendance: 6,000 vs Barrow, FA Cup first round, 1962–63
- Most appearances: David Bainbridge, 642
- Most goals: Mark Reed, 251 in 469 games
- Record transfer fee paid: £5,000 to Hyde United for Gary Walker, 1989
- Record transfer fee received: £16,500 from Rotherham United for Ally Pickering, 1989
- Best FA Cup performance: Third round, 1951–52
- Best FA Trophy performance: Quarter finals, 1970–71, 1971–72
- Best FA Vase performance: Fifth round, 2005–06

== See also ==
- Buxton F.C. players
- Buxton F.C. managers
