= Liam Palmer =

Association footballer (born 1991)

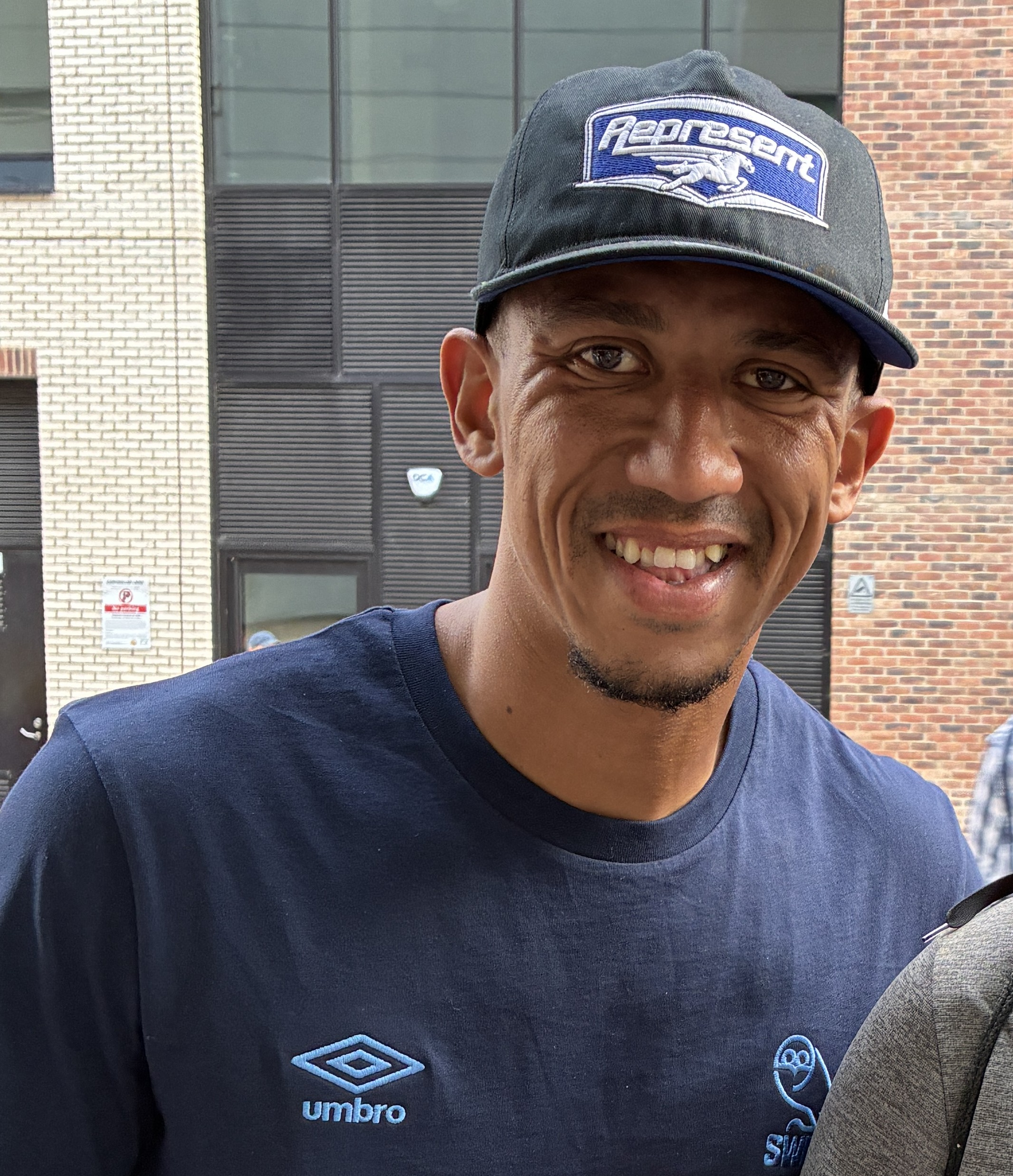
- Palmer in 2026

Personal information
- Full name: Liam Jordan Palmer
- Date of birth: 19 September 1991 (age 35)
- Place of birth: Worksop, England
- Height: 6 ft 2 in (1.88 m)
- Positions: Midfielder; right-back

Team information
- Current team: Sheffield Wednesday
- Number: 2

Youth career
- 1999–2010: Sheffield Wednesday

Senior career*
Years	Team	Apps	(Gls)
2010–	Sheffield Wednesday	460	(11)
2012–2013	→ Tranmere Rovers (loan)	43	(0)

International career
2010	Scotland U19	4	(0)
2010–2012	Scotland U21	8	(0)
2019–2021	Scotland	8	(0)
- * Club domestic league appearances and goals as of 21:56, 20 November 2026 (UTC)

Liam Jordan Palmer (born 19 September 1991) is a professional footballer who plays as a midfielder or right-back for and captains EFL League One club Sheffield Wednesday.

Aside from a loan spell at Tranmere Rovers, he has spent his whole career with the Owls, being deployed in various defensive or midfield roles and making over 500 appearances for the club.

Born in England, Palmer represented Scotland from youth to senior international level. He played for the under-19s and under-21s and made his senior debut in March 2019, all the way until 2021.

== Early life ==
Liam Jordan Palmer was born in Worksop, Nottinghamshire, on 19 September 1991. He is of Scottish and Jamaican descent.

== Club career ==
=== Sheffield Wednesday ===
==== Youth career ====
Palmer began his career with Sheffield Wednesday when he was seven years old. Having progressed through the academy, Palmer appeared three times as an unused substitute throughout the 2009–10 season. Following this, he signed his first-year professional contract and was expected to make a first-team breakthrough ahead of the 2010–11 season. He was also awarded the club's Academy Player of the Year.

==== 2010–2012 ====
Palmer made his debut for Wednesday on 10 August 2010 in the League Cup first round match with Bury, which ended in a 1–0 win at Hillsborough, being replaced in the second half by James O'Connor. On 6 January 2011, he signed a contract extension with the club, keeping him until 2013. After making some appearances from the bench, Palmer made his first start for the Owls on 22 February 2011, against AFC Bournemouth in a 0–0 draw. He went on to make eleven appearances in all competitions in the 2010–11 season.

At the start of the 2011–12 season, Palmer appeared in the first three matches, including one against Blackpool in the first round of the League Cup where he successfully converted a penalty in a shoot-out, which was eventually won 4–2 following a 0–0 draw. He then scored his first senior goal in the 3–1 home league win over Milton Keynes Dons on 10 September 2011. Palmer then set up a goal for Chris O'Grady, who scored twice, in a 3–1 win against Scunthorpe United on 24 January 2012. However, Palmer found his first-team opportunities limited and spent most of the 2011–12 season either on the bench or out of the squad. He would make fourteen league appearances in their promotion back to the Championship during the 2011–12 season.

==== 2012–13: Loan to Tranmere ====
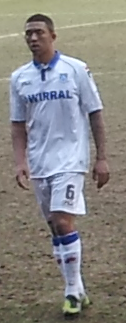
Palmer playing for Tranmere Rovers in 2013

It was confirmed on 16 July 2012 that Palmer had joined League One club Tranmere Rovers on loan for start of 2012–13 football league season for a total of six-months until the January transfer window. He made his debut for the club in the first round of the League Cup against Chesterfield, starting the match and playing 112 minutes before being substituted, as the club won 2–1 after extra time. After making his debut for Tranmere Rovers, Palmer quickly established himself in the starting eleven, playing in a midfield position. In a match against Shrewsbury Town on 25 August 2012, he played a role, setting up an equalising goal, as the club drew 1–1. Palmer then set up the only goal of the game, winning 1–0 against Bury on 1 January 2013. Shortly after, he signed a contract extension with his parent club, keeping him until 2015 and around the same time signed a loan extension with Tranmere Rovers until the end of the 2012–13 season. Since making his debut for the club, Palmer started every match until 15 February 2012 when Tranmere lost 2–0 against Shrewsbury Town - he was sent–off in the 6th minute for a challenge on Joe Jacobson, and served a three match suspension. After serving the suspension, he returned to the first team against Yeovil Town on 2 March 2013, coming on as a 64th-minute substitute, in a 1–0 loss. Palmer regained his first-team place for the rest of the 2012–13 season. At the end of the 2012–13 season, he had made 46 appearances in all competitions.

==== 2013–2016 ====
Ahead of the 2013–14 season, Palmer returned to his parent club and was given the #22 shirt. He also stated that his aim was to make a first-team breakthrough at Sheffield Wednesday following an impressive loan spell at Tranmere Rovers. Palmer made his first appearance of the season, starting the whole game in the right-back position, in a 2–1 loss against Queens Park Rangers in the opening game of the campaign. After the match, he said: "Reserve team football can be very useful but going out on loan means you can get first-team games under your belt. Obviously from my experience, that's the best thing to do and I would advise any young player to do the same because it stands you in good stead. At first I was a bit sceptical of going out on loan and it can be daunting but you've just got to roll with the punches. That's what I did and it has paid off so far." Upon returning to the Owls, Palmer established himself in the first team, where he rotated between right-back, defensive midfield and centre-midfield positions. While playing in the right-back position, he contributed to two consecutive clean sheets on three separate occasions during the 2013–14 season. His performance was praised by Manager Stuart Gray, due to his team effort and great energy. On 26 March 2014, Palmer signed a new four-year contract with the Owls. He then set up two goals in two matches between 29 March 2014 and 4 April 2014 against Watford and Leicester City. For his performance, he was named the club's Player of the Month for March. In April 2014, Palmer was named as Sheffield Wednesday's Player of the Season, as well as winning the 'Wise Old Owls Award'. However, he suffered a groin injury that kept him out for the rest of the season. Palmer made 44 appearances in all competitions in the 2013–14 season.

Ahead of the 2014–15 season, Palmer returned from injury, coming on as a second-half substitute in a 2–1 win against York City in the pre–season friendly on 12 July 2014. It was announced on 31 July 2014 that his number shirt had changed to eight for the new season. He started the season well for Sheffield Wednesday, with the team conceding no goals in the first three matches of the season against Brighton & Hove Albion, Notts County and Derby County. Palmer played a part in a run of three consecutive clean sheets between 13 September and 20 September 2014 against Bolton Wanderers, Birmingham City and Reading. His contribution was praised by manager Stuart Gray. Since the start of the 2014–15 season, Palmer continued to retain his first-team place, mainly playing in the right-back position; at times, he did play in central midfield. He made his 100th appearance for Sheffield Wednesday as the club lost 4–0 against Fulham on 20 December 2014. This was followed up by helping the club keep three consecutive clean sheets in the league between 26 December 2014 and 10 January 2015 against Blackpool, Wigan Athletic and Nottingham Forest. However, during a 1–1 draw against Fulham on 14 March 2015, Palmer suffered ankle injury and was substituted in the 29th minute, resulting in him being sidelined for the rest of the season. At the end of the 2014–15 season, he made 36 appearances in all competitions.

Ahead of the 2015–16 season, Palmer made a recovery from the ankle injury and made his return in a friendly match against Alfreton Town on 11 July 2015. He also switched his shirt number to #2. At the start of the season, Palmer found himself competing with Jack Hunt over the right-back position, and was placed on the substitutes' bench. As a result, his first-team starts were mainly when Hunt was absent or because of Carlos Carvalhal's tactical decisions. Despite this, he contributed the assist for one of the best goals of that season, in a 1–1 draw against Leeds United on 22 August 2015. As the 2015–16 season progressed, Palmer continued to be in and out of the side. At the end of the 2015–16 season, he had made 19 appearances in all competitions, and was awarded by the Sheffield Wednesday Community Programme.

Ahead of the 2016–17 season, Palmer switched his shirt number to #16. However, he continued to compete with Hunt over the right-back role, which saw him placed on the bench once again, though he made a number of starts in Hunt's absence. At one point during the season, Palmer played in the left-back position against Burton Albion on 16 August 2016. It was announced on 26 October 2016 that he had signed a contract extension with the club until the summer of 2019. Palmer then helped Sheffield Wednesday's defence by keeping three consecutive clean sheets between 13 December and 26 December against Barnsley, Rotherham United and Newcastle United.

==== 2017–2020 ====
On 14 January 2017, he made his 150th appearance for the club in a 2–0 win against Huddersfield Town. Palmer finished with 23 appearances by the end of the 2016–17 season.

At the start of the 2017–18 season, Palmer continued to compete with Hunt over the right-back position and again was usually a substitute though he made a number of starts in Hunt's absence. At the start of January 2018, he began rotating in playing in either the right-back and right-midfield positions, but soon lost his first-team place once again under the management of Jos Luhukay. Despite this, he went on to contribute two assists, against Preston North End and Queens Park Rangers. Despite suffering injuries towards the end of the 2017–18 season, Palmer went on to make a total of 30 appearances.

Ahead of the 2018–19 season, Palmer swapped his shirt number back to #2. At the start of the season he was used in right–midfield and played the whole game in a 3–2 loss against Wigan Athletic on the opening day. After missing two matches, Palmer returned to the starting line-up in the right-back position, in a 2–1 win over Millwall on 22 August 2018. He regained his place at right-back for the next three matches before dropping out of the starting line–up once again. After his return to the first team, Palmer found himself in and out of the starting line-up, due to strong competition and tactical reasons, for the next two months. He then kept two consecutive clean sheets between 22 and 26 December 2018 against Preston North End and Middlesbrough. During a match against Middlesbrough on 26 December 2018, Palmer made his 200th appearance for Sheffield Wednesday. He then contributed to four consecutive clean sheets between 19 January 2019 and 12 February 2019. Palmer regained his first-team place and played in the right-back position for the next three months. Having played in the right–midfield position on two occasions during 2018–19, Palmer began playing in the left-back position under Steve Bruce. His performance led him to believe he could convince the club to offer him a new contract and that he wanted to stay at Sheffield Wednesday. Palmer, once again, had a role in consecutive clean sheets between 26 February 2019 and 4 March 2019 against Brentford and Sheffield United. Later in the season, he continued to rotate playing in either the right-back and left-back positions. Despite missing one more match, he went on to make 39 appearances in all competitions. Following this, Palmer was offered a new contract by the club, and it was announced on 12 July 2019 that he had signed a new three-year contract with Sheffield Wednesday.

Palmer started the 2019–20 season well when he set up the club's first goal of a 3–1 win over Reading in the opening game of the season. He then started in the next two matches before suffering a back injury that saw him miss two games. He returned to the starting line–up and played 75 minutes before being substituted, in a 2–1 loss against Queens Park Rangers on 31 August 2019. He then contributed to two consecutive clean sheets between 22 October 2019 and 26 October 2019 against Stoke City and Leeds United. After returning from injury, he continued to keep his first-team place, playing in either the right-back or left-back spot for the next two months. This lasted until Palmer was sent–off in the last minute of the game, in a 2–1 defeat against West Bromwich Albion on 23 November 2019. Following this, he served a three match suspension. It wasn't until on 14 December 2019 when he returned to the starting line–up against Nottingham Forest in a 4–0 win. This was followed by the defence keeping another clean sheet, in a 1–0 win against Bristol City. However, during a 2–1 loss against Cardiff City on 29 December 2019, Palmer suffered an ankle injury following a challenge from Junior Hoilett and was out for a month. After being sidelined for a month, he returned to the starting line–up against Millwall on 1 February 2020 and kept a clean sheet, in a 0–0 draw. Palmer then captained Sheffield Wednesday for the first time in his career, as they lost 3–0 against Reading on 15 February 2020. A week later on 26 February against Charlton Athletic, he made his 250th appearance for the club, as they won 1–0. Palmer then made his 300th career appearances on 29 June 2020, in a 2–1 loss against Bristol City. Despite suffering another injury later in the 2019–20 season, he continued to retain his first-team place, playing in either the left-back, right-back or centre-back positions. Despite the 2019–20 season being suspended as a result of the COVID-19 pandemic, Palmer went on to make 34 appearances in all competitions.

==== 2021–present ====
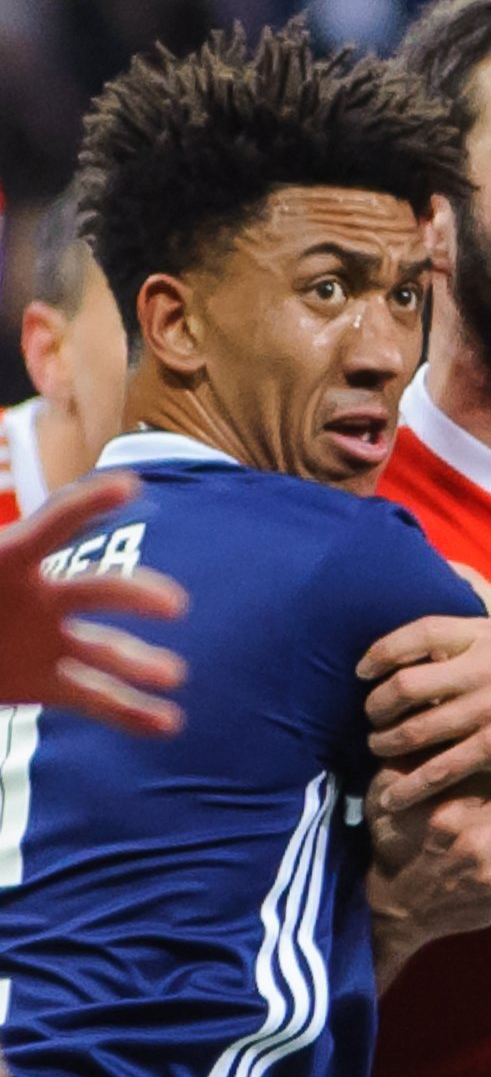
Palmer with Scotland in 2019

On 11 November 2021, he would extend his stay at the club by a further two years, keeping him tied down until the summer of 2023. He would make his 350th Sheffield Wednesday appearance against Bolton Wanderers on 20 August 2022, taking the captain's armband from Barry Bannan and scoring his fifth goal for the club.

His start to the 2022–23 campaign would see him get recognition for his good performances. He won the club's Player of the Month, and was nominated for the EFL Player of the Month for August, subsequently winning the award. He won the club's Player of the Month for February, his second Player of the Month award for the season, having scored his fourth goal of the campaign and playing his part in helping break the club's all-time clean sheet record in a single campaign. On 30 April, he was named the club's Player of the Season winner as well as the Players' Player of the Season and he was also honoured with a Lifetime Achievement award. Following the 1–0 victory against Barnsley in the League-One play-offs, Palmer confirmed an option in his contract had been triggered and he would be staying another year at the club. This was confirmed in the club's retained list.

Palmer made his 400th Sheffield Wednesday appearance on 26 August 2023 in a 2–1 away defeat to Cardiff City. He became the 15th player in history to feature in at least 400 matches for the club. Following the end of the 2023–24 season, the club had offered Palmer a new contract which was signed on 31 May 2024.

On 3 August 2024, Palmer received his testimonial against CD Leganés from La Liga, with the game finishing 0–0.

Following the departure of Barry Bannan to Millwall, Liam Palmer was appointed captain until the end of the season. On 10 March 2026, he made his 500th club appearance for Sheffield Wednesday playing the full 90 minutes against Watford. Following the end of the 2025–26 season, the new ownership at Sheffield Wednesday exercised their one year option to keep him at the club until 2027.

== International career ==
In international football, Palmer was initially eligible to play for England through his birthplace, Scotland through his Carluke-born grandmother, and Jamaica.

He represented Scotland at the under-19 level, where he made four appearances for the side. Later in the year, he made his debut for Scotland under-21s in a 3–1 win against Northern Ireland on 17 November 2010. He went on to make eight appearances for Scotland U21 over the next two years.

Palmer was selected for the full Scotland squad for the first time in March 2019, and made his senior debut in the 3–0 away defeat to Kazakhstan in a Euro 2020 qualifier.

== Personal life ==
Palmer grew up supporting Sheffield Wednesday, the team where he started his career. He also idolised Steven Gerrard. Palmer spoke of his fondness for Show Racism the Red Card, saying: "I think Show Racism the Red Card are doing an excellent job in raising awareness and educating children about racism, which is not just a problem in football, but in schools and everyday life." Palmer has stated that he himself was a victim of racial abuse.

Palmer also set up his own football academy called Palmer School of Excellence, based in Worksop. The aim is to boys and girls of all ages and abilities the opportunity to play football and develop their social skills.

In 2019, the Liverpool Echo newspaper claimed in an article that Palmer was the son of former footballer and manager Carlton Palmer, who also played for Sheffield Wednesday. In response, Palmer confirmed that his father's name is Terry and he worked as a painter and decorator.

== Career statistics ==
=== Club ===
As of 20 November 2026

Appearances and goals by club, season and competition
Club	Season	League			FA Cup		League Cup		Other		Total	
Club	Season	Division	Apps	Goals	Apps	Goals	Apps	Goals	Apps	Goals	Apps	Goals
Sheffield Wednesday	2010–11	League One	9	0	1	0	1	0	0	0	11	0
Sheffield Wednesday	2011–12	League One	14	1	3	0	2	0	1 (Note: Appearance(s) in Football League Trophy)	0	20	1
Sheffield Wednesday	2012–13	Championship	0	0	—		—		—		0	0
Sheffield Wednesday	2013–14	Championship	39	0	4	0	1	0	—		44	0
Sheffield Wednesday	2014–15	Championship	35	0	1	0	3	0	—		39	0
Sheffield Wednesday	2015–16	Championship	15	0	2	0	2	0	0	0	19	0
Sheffield Wednesday	2016–17	Championship	21	0	1	0	1	0	0	0	23	0
Sheffield Wednesday	2017–18	Championship	25	0	3	0	1	0	—		29	0
Sheffield Wednesday	2018–19	Championship	35	0	3	0	1	0	—		39	0
Sheffield Wednesday	2019–20	Championship	33	0	1	0	0	0	—		34	0
Sheffield Wednesday	2020–21	Championship	39	1	0	0	1	0	—		41	1
Sheffield Wednesday	2021–22	League One	39	1	2	0	1	0	4 (Note: Appearance(s) in League One play-offs & Football League Trophy)	1	46	2
Sheffield Wednesday	2022–23	League One	44	5	4	0	1	0	3 (Note: Appearance(s) in League One play-offs)	1	52	6
Sheffield Wednesday	2023–24	Championship	34	2	3	1	1	0	—		38	3
Sheffield Wednesday	2024–25	Championship	23	0	0	0	4	0	—		27	0
Sheffield Wednesday	2025–26	Championship	45	1	0	0	2	0	—		47	1
Sheffield Wednesday	2026–27	League One	10	0	1	0	2	0	2	0	15	0
Sheffield Wednesday	Total		460	11	29	1	24	0	10	2	524	14
Tranmere Rovers (loan)	2012–13	League One	43	0	1	0	2	0	0	0	46	0
Career total			503	11	30	1	27	0	10	2	570	14

=== International ===
Appearances and goals by national team and year
National team	Year	Apps	Goals
Scotland	2019	5	0
Scotland	2020	2	0
Scotland	2021	1	0
Total		8	0

== Honours ==
Sheffield Wednesday

- Football League One second-place promotion: 2011–12
- EFL League One play-offs: 2023

Individual

- Sheffield Wednesday Player of the Year: 2013–14, 2022–23
- EFL League One Player of the Month: August 2022

== See also ==
- List of Scotland international footballers born outside Scotland
