= Jay Glover =

English footballer (born 2003)

Personal information
- Full name: Jay Michael Glover
- Date of birth: 1 May 2003 (age 23)
- Place of birth: Sheffield
- Position: Midfielder

Team information
- Current team: Hallam

Youth career
- 2017–2021: Sheffield Wednesday

Senior career*
Years	Team	Apps	(Gls)
2021–2024	Sheffield Wednesday	0	(0)
2022–2023	→ Belper Town (loan)	3	(0)
2023	→ Gainsborough Trinity (loan)	8	(0)
2023	→ Spennymoor Town (loan)	5	(0)
2024	Matlock Town	8	(0)
2024–2025	Hyde United	6	(0)
2025	Hamilton Wanderers	18	(0)
2025–	Hallam	0	(0)
- * Club domestic league appearances and goals as of 09:46, 17 September 2025 (UTC)

Jay Glover (born 1 May 2003) is an English professional footballer who plays as a midfielder for Hallam.

== Career ==
=== Sheffield Wednesday ===
Glover joined Wednesday aged 14 on 8 May 2017 after playing with local sides Sheffield Boys, Greenhill and Young Owls. After completing his two-year scholarship, Glover signed his maiden professional deal in June 2021. Jay Glover makes his professional debut against Rochdale in the EFL Cup on 23 August 2022.

On 2 December 2022, he joined Belper Town on a one-month loan alongside teammate Paulo Aguas. Following the expiration of his one-month loan with Belper Town, he would join Gainsborough Trinity on a three-month loan. On 3 May 2023, it was announced that Glover was offered a new contract in the clubs retained list. His new contract was signed on 1 July 2023 along with teammate Mackenzie Maltby.

On 7 November he joined Spennymoor Town on loan. He returned from his loan spell on 5 December 2023, having played five times.

On 13 May 2024, it was confirmed he would be released at the end of his contract.

=== Matlock Town ===
On 9 August 2024, Glover joined Matlock Town following a trial. His contract was cancelled with the club the following month on 20 September 2024.

=== Hyde United ===
On 27 September 2024, Glover joined Hyde United. He left Hyde United in January 2025 to explore opportunities of playing football in New Zealand.

=== Hallam ===
In September 2025, he returned from New Zealand and signed for Hallam.

== Career statistics ==
As of 23 August 2025

Appearances and goals by club, season and competition
Club	Season	League			National Cup		League Cup		Other		Total	
Club	Season	Division	Apps	Goals	Apps	Goals	Apps	Goals	Apps	Goals	Apps	Goals
Sheffield Wednesday	2022–23	League One	0	0	0	0	1	0	2 (Note: Appearance(s) in EFL Trophy)	0	3	0
Sheffield Wednesday	2023–24	Championship	0	0	0	0	0	0	–		0	0
Sheffield Wednesday	Total		0	0	0	0	1	0	2	0	3	0
Belper Town (loan)	2022–23	Northern Premier League	3	0	0	0	–		–		3	0
Gainsborough Trinity (loan)	2022–23	Northern Premier League	8	0	0	0	–		–		8	0
Spennymoor Town (loan)	2023–24	National League North	5	0	0	0	–		–		5	0
Matlock Town	2024–25	Northern Premier League	8	0	1	0	–		–		9	0
Hyde United	2024–25	Northern Premier League	6	0	0	0	–		1 (Note: Appearance(s) in FA Trophy)	0	7	0
Hamilton Wanderers	2025	NRFL Championship	18	0	3	0	0	0	–		21	0
Hallam	2025–26	NPL Division One East	0	0	0	0	–		0	0	0	0
Career total			48	0	4	0	1	0	3	0	56	0
