= Will Trueman =

English footballer (born 2002)

Personal information
- Full name: William Henry Mangham Trueman
- Date of birth: 14 October 2002 (age 24)
- Place of birth: Rotherham
- Height: 5 ft 11 in (1.80 m)
- Position: Central midfielder

Team information
- Current team: Buxton
- Number: 2

Youth career
- Sheffield Wednesday

Senior career*
Years	Team	Apps	(Gls)
2021–2023	Sheffield Wednesday	0	(0)
2022–2023	→ Mickleover (loan)	18	(1)
2023–2024	Mickleover	20	(1)
2024–	Buxton	65	(1)
- * Club domestic league appearances and goals as of 15:11, 9 August 2026 (UTC)

William Henry Mangham Trueman (born 14 October 2002) is an English professional footballer who plays for National League North club Buxton.

== Career ==
=== Sheffield Wednesday ===
On 26 April, Trueman won the Championship Apprentice of the Year, joining the likes of Jude Bellingham, Ryan Sessegnon and Ademola Lookman, as well as ex Owl Mark Beevers in winning the award. Trueman then signed his first professional contract with the club on 21 June 2021. He had a professional debut to remember in the EFL Trophy against Leicester City U21 on 18 October 2022, starting and scoring his maiden goal in the game. Trueman was not included on the retained list which was announced on 3 May 2023.

=== Mickleover ===
On 9 December 2022, Trueman joined Mickloeover on a one-month loan deal. He joined permanently at the end of the season.

=== Buxton ===
On 12 June 2024, Buxton confirmed that Trueman would be signing for them.

== Career statistics ==
As of 8 August 2026

Appearances and goals by club, season and competition
Club	Season	League			FA Cup		League Cup		Other		Total	
Club	Season	Division	Apps	Goals	Apps	Goals	Apps	Goals	Apps	Goals	Apps	Goals
Sheffield Wednesday	2022–23	League One	0	0	0	0	0	0	1 (Note: Appearance(s) in EFL Trophy)	1	1	1
Mickleover (loan)	2022–23	Southern Football League	18	1	0	0	—		0	0	18	1
Mickleover	2023–24	Southern Football League	20	1	0	0	—		2 (Note: Appearance(s) in FA Trophy & Playoffs)	0	22	1
Buxton	2024–25	National League North	29	0	0	0	—		1 (Note: Appearance(s) in National League North Playoffs)	0	30	0
Buxton	2025–26	National League North	35	1	1	0	—		2	0	38	1
Buxton	2026–27	National League North	1	0	0	0	—		0	0	1	0
Buxton	Total		65	1	1	0	0	0	3	0	69	1
Career total			103	3	1	0	0	0	6	1	110	4
