= 2021–22 Rotherham United F.C. season =

Rotherham United
2021–22 season
- Chairman: Tony Stewart
- Manager: Paul Warne
- Stadium: New York Stadium
- League One: 2nd, promoted
- FA Cup: Third round
- EFL Cup: First round
- EFL Trophy: Winners
- Top goalscorer: League: Michael Smith (19); All: Michael Smith (25)
- Highest home attendance: 11,522
- Lowest home attendance: 8,004
Home colours	Away colours	Third colours

The 2021–22 season is Rotherham United's 97th year in their history and first season back in League One since the 2019–20 season following relegation last season. Along with the league, the club will also compete in the FA Cup, the EFL Cup and the EFL Trophy. The season covers the period from 1 July 2021 to 30 June 2022.

== Squad statistics ==
=== Player statistics ===
As of final game of season, 30 April 2022.

Players with zero appearances have been unused substitutes in one or more games.

No.	Pos.	Nat.	Name	Total		League		FA Cup		EFL Cup		EFL Trophy		Discipline	
No.	Pos.	Nat.	Name	Apps	Goals	Apps	Goals	Apps	Goals	Apps	Goals	Apps	Goals	Yellow card	Red card
1	GK	(Sweden)	Viktor Johansson	33	0	26	0	1	0	1	0	5	0	1	0
30	GK	(England)	Josh Chapman	0	0	0	0	0	0	0	0	0	0	0	0
31	GK	(England)	Josh Vickers	25	0	20	0	2	0	0	0	3	0	0	0
2	DF	(Jamaica)	Wes Harding	38+8	1	32+6	0	2+1	0	0	0	4+1	1	9	1
3	DF	(England)	Joe Mattock	16+11	1	10+10	0	0+1	0	1	0	5	1	7	0
6	DF	(England)	Richard Wood	39+6	1	33+6	1	3	0	0	0	3	0	7	1
15	DF	(England)	Tolaji Bola	10+3	0	3+1	0	0+2	0	0	0	7	0	1	0
20	DF	(England)	Michael Ihiekwe	51+1	5	42	3	3	1	1	0	5+1	1	7	0
21	DF	(England)	Angus MacDonald	4+4	0	3+4	0	0	0	0	0	1	0	1	1
23	DF	(England)	Rarmani Edmonds-Green	34+4	3	26+2	3	2+1	0	1	0	5+1	0	4	0
35	DF	(England)	Jake Hull	3	2	0	0	0	0	0	0	3	2	0	0
37	DF	(England)	Nathan Exton	0	0	0	0	0	0	0	0	0	0	0	0
38	DF	(England)	Mack Warne	0+1	0	0	0	0	0	0	0	0+1	0	1	0
4	MF	(England)	Daniel Barlaser	48+4	9	40+4	9	3	0	1	0	4	0	7	0
7	MF	(England)	Jordi Osei-Tutu	10+6	1	9+5	0	0	0	0	0	1+1	1	2	0
8	MF	(England)	Ben Wiles	46+7	10	43+3	8	1+1	1	0+1	0	2+2	1	5	0
11	MF	(Republic of Ireland)	Chiedozie Ogbene	40+13	4	37+8	3	2+1	0	0+1	0	1+3	1	1	0
14	MF	(England)	Mickel Miller	15+15	4	11+12	3	1	0	0	0	3+3	1	2	1
16	MF	(Scotland)	Jamie Lindsay	19+16	1	15+13	1	0+2	0	0	0	4+1	0	5	0
17	MF	(Northern Ireland)	Shane Ferguson	28+12	1	25+7	1	2	0	1	0	0+5	0	3	0
18	MF	(England)	Oliver Rathbone	45+7	2	39+3	2	3	0	1	0	2+4	0	12	0
22	MF	(England)	Hakeem Odoffin	10+12	1	1+10	0	1+2	0	1	0	7	1	1	0
40	MF	(England)	Samuel Greenhouse	0	0	0	0	0	0	0	0	0	0	0	0
9	FW	(Northern Ireland)	Will Grigg	20+8	6	13+6	2	2+1	1	0	0	5+1	3	0	0
10	FW	(England)	Freddie Ladapo	28+13	15	22+9	11	2	1	1	0	3+4	3	1	0
12	FW	(Republic of Ireland)	Georgie Kelly	0+1	1	0+1	1	0	0	0	0	0	0	1	0
19	FW	(Republic of Ireland)	Joshua Kayode	11+17	2	6+14	1	0+2	0	1	0	4+1	1	2	0
24	FW	(England)	Michael Smith	50+4	25	45	19	2	1	0+1	0	3+3	5	8	0
32	FW	(England)	Jerome Greaves	0	0	0	0	0	0	0	0	0	0	0	0
34	FW	(England)	Jacob Gratton	1+1	0	0	0	0	0	0	0	1+1	0	0	0
36	FW	(England)	Curtis Durose	1	0	0	0	0	0	0	0	1	0	1	0
39	FW	(Northern Ireland)	Ciaran McGuckin	0+1	0	0	0	0	0	0	0	0+1	0	0	0
Players who have left the club during the season
5	DF	(Jamaica)	Curtis Tilt	0	0	0	0	0	0	0	0	0	0	0	0
7	MF	(England)	Kieran Sadlier	13+8	6	5+7	1	1+1	0	1	1	6	4	1	0

=== Goalscorers ===
As of final game of season, 30 April 2022.

Place	Position	Nation	Number	Name	Total	League	FA Cup	EFL Cup	EFL Trophy
1	FW	(England)	24	Michael Smith	25	19	1	0	5
2	FW	(England)	10	Freddie Ladapo	15	11	1	0	3
3	MF	(England)	8	Ben Wiles	10	8	1	0	1
4	MF	(England)	4	Daniel Barlaser	9	9	0	0	0
5	FW	(Northern Ireland)	9	Will Grigg	7	3	1	0	3
6	MF	(Republic of Ireland)	7	Kieran Sadlier	6	1	0	1	4
7	DF	(England)	20	Michael Ihiekwe	5	3	1	0	1
8	MF	(Republic of Ireland)	11	Chiedozie Ogbene	4	3	0	0	1
=	MF	(England)	14	Mickel Miller	4	3	0	0	1
10	DF	(England)	23	Rarmani Edmonds-Green	3	3	0	0	0
11	MF	(England)	18	Oliver Rathbone	2	2	0	0	0
=	FW	(Republic of Ireland)	19	Joshua Kayode	2	1	0	0	1
=	DF	(England)	35	Jake Hull	2	0	0	0	2
14	DF	(England)	6	Richard Wood	1	1	0	0	0
=	FW	(Republic of Ireland)	12	Georgie Kelly	1	1	0	0	0
=	MF	(Scotland)	16	Jamie Lindsay	1	1	0	0	0
=	MF	(Northern Ireland)	17	Shane Ferguson	1	1	0	0	0
=	DF	(Jamaica)	2	Wes Harding	1	0	0	0	1
=	DF	(England)	3	Joe Mattock	1	0	0	0	1
=	MF	(England)	7	Jordi Osei-Tutu	1	0	0	0	1
=	MF	(England)	22	Hakeem Odoffin	1	0	0	0	1

== Pre-season ==
The Millers announced they would have friendly matches against Parkgate, Frickley Athletic, Rochdale, Harrogate Town, Grimsby Town, Newcastle United, Belper Town and Middlesbrough as part of their pre-season preparations. As part of a training camp in Hungary, the club arranged a behind-closed-doors friendly against III. Kerületi TVE in Budapest.

10 July 2021 Friendly	Parkgate	0–11	Rotherham United	Parkgate
13:00 BST		Report	Smith 13'; Kayode 17' (pen.); Wood 28'; Miller 53'; Ladapo 55', 67', 76'; Sadlier 68'; Wiles 68', 90'; Crooks 84'	Stadium: Roundwood Sports Complex

14 July 2021 Friendly	III. Kerületi TVE	0–4	Rotherham United	Budapest
19:00 CEST		Report	Lindsay 40' (o.g.); Ladapo; Kayode

17 July 2021 Friendly	Frickley Athletic	Cancelled	Rotherham United	South Elmsall
15:00 BST				Stadium: Westfield Lane
Note: Match cancelled due to number of players having to self-isolate.

20 July 2021 Friendly	Rochdale	2–2	Rotherham United	Spotland
19:00 BST	Beesley 65' (pen.), 71'	Report	Ogbene 83'; Ihiekwe 90'	Stadium: Crown Oil Arena

21 July 2021 Friendly	Harrogate Town	1–3	Rotherham United	Harrogate
19:30 BST	Armstrong 65'	Report	Smith 6', 14'; Ihiekwe 52'	Stadium: EnviroVent Stadium; Referee: Marc Edwards

24 July 2021 Friendly	Grimsby Town	0–1	Rotherham United	Cleethorpes
15:00 BST		Report	Ihiekwe 84'	Stadium: Blundell Park; Attendance: 3,008; Referee: Geoff Eltringham

27 July 2021 Friendly	Rotherham United	1–1	Newcastle United	Rotherham
19:00 BST	Smith 8'	Report	Hendrick 84'	Stadium: AESSEAL New York Stadium; Attendance: 4,370; Referee: Andrew Madley

29 July 2021 Friendly	Belper Town	Cancelled	Rotherham United	Belper
19:00 BST				Stadium: Christchurch Meadow
Note: Match was cancelled.

30 July 2021 Friendly	Rotherham United	0–1	Middlesbrough	Rotherham
19:00 BST		Report	McNair 14'	Stadium: AESSEAL New York Stadium

== Competitions ==
=== League One ===
==== League table ====
Pos	Team	Pld	W	D	L	GF	GA	GD	Pts	Promotion, qualification or relegation
1	Wigan Athletic (C, P)	46	27	11	8	82	44	+38	92	Promotion to EFL Championship
2	Rotherham United (P)	46	27	9	10	70	33	+37	90	Promotion to EFL Championship
3	Milton Keynes Dons	46	26	11	9	78	44	+34	89	Qualification for League One play-offs
4	Sheffield Wednesday	46	24	13	9	78	50	+28	85	Qualification for League One play-offs
5	Sunderland (O, P)	46	24	12	10	79	53	+26	84	Qualification for League One play-offs
6	Wycombe Wanderers	46	23	14	9	75	51	+24	83	Qualification for League One play-offs
7	Plymouth Argyle	46	23	11	12	68	48	+20	80	
8	Oxford United	46	22	10	14	82	59	+23	76	

Source: EFL Official Website
Rules for classification: 1) Points; 2) Goal difference; 3) Number of goals scored; 4) Head-to-head results; 5) Wins; 6) Away goals; 7) Penalty points based on yellow and red cards received excluding the last four games of the season (sec 9.5); 8) 12-point sending off offences; 9) If the tie affects the automatic promotion or relegation places, a play-off game or games would be held between the two tied teams
(C) Champions; (O) Play-off winners; (P) Promoted

==== Results summary ====
Overall								Home						Away					
Pld	W	D	L	GF	GA	GD	Pts	W	D	L	GF	GA	GD	W	D	L	GF	GA	GD
46	27	9	10	70	33	+37	90	15	3	5	43	22	+21	12	6	5	27	11	+16

Last updated: 30 April 2022.

==== Results by matchday ====
Matchday	1	2	3	4	5	6	7	8	9	10	11	12	13	14	15	16	17	18	19	20	21	22	23	24	25	26	27	28	29	30	31	32	33	34	35	36	37	38	39	40	41	42	43	44	45	46
Ground	H	A	A	H	H	H	A	A	H	H	A	H	H	A	H	A	H	A	A	H	H	A	A	H	A	H	A	A	H	A	A	H	H	A	A	H	A	H	H	H	A	H	A	H	A	A
Result	W	L	W	L	W	L	D	W	D	W	W	W	D	W	W	D	W	W	D	W	W	W	L	W	L	W	W	W	W	W	W	D	W	W	D	L	D	W	L	L	L	W	L	W	D	W
Position	1	10	6	11	8	13	13	6	5	5	4	5	5	5	4	3	2	1	1	1	1	1	1	1	3	3	1	1	1	1	1	1	1	1	1	1	1	1	1	3	3	2	2	2	2	2

Updated to match(es) played on 30 April 2022. Source: Statto.com
A = Away; H = Home; W = Win; D = Draw; L = Loss

==== Matches ====
Rotherham United's fixtures were announced on 24 June 2021.

7 August 2021 1	Rotherham United	2–0	Plymouth Argyle	Rotherham
15:00 BST	Ladapo 10'; Wiles 38'; Barlaser (yellow card) 49'; Lindsay (yellow card) 66'	Report		Stadium: AESSEAL New York Stadium; Attendance: 9,417; Referee: Seb Stockbridge

14 August 2021 2	Wigan Athletic	1–0	Rotherham United	Wigan
15:00 BST	Robinson (yellow card) 25'; Wyke (yellow card) 45+1'; Lang (yellow card) 75'; Massey (yellow card) 87'; Keane 90+5'	Report	Harding (yellow card) 54'	Stadium: DW Stadium; Attendance: 10,217; Referee: Robert Lewis

17 August 2021 3	Morecambe	0–1	Rotherham United	Morecambe
19:45 BST	Andrésson (yellow card) 22'; Cooney (yellow card) 90+4'	Report	Smith 60' (yellow card) 90+4'; Mattock (yellow card) 88'	Stadium: Mazuma Stadium; Attendance: 4,004; Referee: David Webb

21 August 2021 4	Rotherham United	0–2	Sheffield Wednesday	Rotherham
13:00 BST	Sadlier (penalty missed) 45+3'; Rathbone (yellow card) 66'	Report	Wing (yellow card) 17'; Kamberi 50'; Peacock-Farrell (yellow card) 74'; Gregory 77'; Hunt (yellow card) 88'; Adeniran (yellow card) 90+4'	Stadium: AESSEAL New York Stadium; Attendance: 11,522; Referee: Marc Edwards

28 August 2021 5	Rotherham United	2–0	Doncaster Rovers	Rotherham
13:00 BST	Miller (yellow card) 4', (red card) 53'; Smith 27', 45+2'	Report	Galbraith (yellow card) 56'; Smith (yellow card) 77'; Knoyle (yellow card) 90+5'	Stadium: AESSEAL New York Stadium; Attendance: 9,748; Referee: Martin Coy

11 September 2021 6	Rotherham United	2–4	Fleetwood Town	Rotherham
15:00 BST	Smith 38'; Sadlier 45+4' (pen.)	Report	Morton 24'; Garner 54'; Clark (yellow card) 56'; Andrew 61'; Camps 69'; Hill (yellow card) 88'; Rossiter (yellow card) 89'	Stadium: AESSEAL New York Stadium; Attendance: 8,463; Referee: Craig Hicks

14 September 2021 7	Lincoln City	1–1	Rotherham United	Lincoln
19:45 BST	Fiorini 55'; Jackson (yellow card) 66'	Report	Smith 22', (yellow card) 56'; Mattock (yellow card) 71'	Stadium: LNER Stadium; Attendance: 8,788; Referee: Peter Wright

18 September 2021 8	Bolton Wanderers	0–2	Rotherham United	Horwich
15:00 BST	Afolayan (yellow card) 64'; Williams (yellow card) 89'; Jones (yellow card) 90+5'	Report	Wood (yellow card) 6'; Wiles 18', 21'; Mattock (yellow card) 51'; Harding (yellow card) 79'	Stadium: University of Bolton Stadium; Attendance: 20,877; Referee: James Bell

25 September 2021 9	Rotherham United	1–1	Crewe Alexandra	Rotherham
15:00 BST	Rathbone 54'; Harding (yellow card) 74' (yellow-red card) 90'; Smith (yellow card) 85'	Report	Jääskeläinen (yellow card) 44'; Porter 90+1' (pen.)	Stadium: AESSEAL New York Stadium; Attendance: 8,747; Referee: Sam Allison

28 September 2021 10	Rotherham United	3–0	AFC Wimbledon	Rotherham
19:45 BST	Grigg 36'; Smith 45+1', 89'; Johansson (yellow card) 81'	Report	Pressley (yellow card) 80'	Stadium: AESSEAL New York Stadium; Attendance: 8,004; Referee: Andy Haines

2 October 2021 11	Cheltenham Town	0–2	Rotherham United	Cheltenham
15:00 BST		Report	Grigg 51'; Edmonds-Green 75'	Stadium: Jonny-Rocks Stadium; Attendance: 3,748; Referee: Darren Drysdale

16 October 2021 12	Rotherham United	4–1	Portsmouth	Rotherham
15:00 BST	Smith 29', 55'; Ihiekwe (yellow card) 41'; Wood 60'; Wiles 62'; Rathbone (yellow card) 84'	Report	Harness 49'; Romeo (yellow card) 78'; Freeman (yellow card) 80'	Stadium: AESSEAL New York Stadium; Attendance: 9,684; Referee: Anthony Backhouse

19 October 2021 13	Rotherham United	0–0	Wycombe Wanderers	Rotherham
19:45 GMT	Rathbone (yellow card) 39'; Ferguson (yellow card) 48'	Report	Tafazolli (yellow card) 45+4'	Stadium: AESSEAL New York Stadium; Attendance: 8,104; Referee: Bobby Madley

23 October 2021 14	Milton Keynes Dons	0–3	Rotherham United	Denbigh
15:00 BST	Kasumu (yellow card) 68'	Report	Ihiekwe 27'; Smith 65'; Ladapo 72'; Rathbone (yellow card) 87'	Stadium: Stadium MK; Attendance: 8,448; Referee: Chris Sarginson

30 October 2021 15	Rotherham United	5–1	Sunderland	Rotherham
15:00 BST	Smith 10', (yellow card) 71', (goal) 73'; Ladapo 41', 88'; Ihiekwe 53'; Ferguson (yellow card) 70'	Report	Stewart 24'; O'Nien (yellow card) 38'; McGeady (yellow card) 46' (yellow-red card) 56'; Evans (yellow card) 64'	Stadium: AESSEAL New York Stadium; Attendance: 10,573; Referee: David Rock

2 November 2021 16	Charlton Athletic	1–1	Rotherham United	Charlton
19:45 GMT	Stockley (yellow card) 5'; Famewo (yellow card) 40'; Washington 83'; Purrington (yellow card) 84'	Report	Wiles (yellow card) 42'; Smith (yellow card) 44'; Miller 45+2'; Ihiekwe (yellow card) 50'; Barlaser (yellow card) 89'	Stadium: The Valley; Attendance: 12,592; Referee: Scott Oldham

20 November 2021 17	Rotherham United	3–1	Cambridge United	Rotherham
15:00 GMT	Wood (yellow card) 30'; Wiles 34'; Barlaser 45+3' (pen.); Ladapo 81'; Lindsay (yellow card) 83'	Report	Smith 51'	Stadium: AESSEAL New York Stadium; Attendance: 9,534; Referee: Andy Davies

23 November 2021 18	Ipswich Town	0–2	Rotherham United	Ipswich
19:45 GMT	Morsy (yellow card) 88'	Report	Wiles 24'; Lindsay (yellow card) 40'; Ihiekwe (yellow card) 43'; Ferguson 59'; Barlaser (yellow card) 87'	Stadium: Portman Road; Attendance: 18,221; Referee: Gavin Ward

27 November 2021 19	Oxford United	0–0	Rotherham United	Littlemore
15:00 GMT	Seddon (yellow card) 68'	Report	Barlaser (yellow card) 37'; Miller (yellow card) 48'; Rathbone (yellow card) 64'; Wiles (yellow card) 69'; Harding (yellow card) 90+1'	Stadium: The Kassam Stadium; Attendance: 7,620; Referee: Sam Purkiss

7 December 2021 20	Rotherham United	5–1	Gillingham	Rotherham
19:45 GMT	Ladapo 39'; Miller 45'; Barlaser 59' (pen.), (penalty missed) 72', 81'; Ogbene 89'	Report	Lee 5'; Jackson (yellow card) 38' (yellow-red card) 71'	Stadium: AESSEAL New York Stadium; Attendance: 8,008; Referee: Ross Joyce

11 December 2021 21	Rotherham United	3–1	Burton Albion	Rotherham
15:00 GMT	Ladapo 24', 48'; Barlaser 84'	Report	Hemmings 44'; Borthwick-Jackson (yellow card) 90+3'	Stadium: AESSEAL New York Stadium; Attendance: 9,007; Referee: Sam Allison

18 December 2021 22	Cambridge United	0–1	Rotherham United	Cambridge
15:00 GMT	Smith (yellow card) 45+3'; Ironside (yellow card) 90'	Report	Barlaser 66'; Ihiekwe (yellow card) 87'	Stadium: Abbey Stadium; Attendance: 5,323; Referee: Trevor Kettle

26 December 2021 23	Accrington Stanley	1–0	Rotherham United	Accrington
15:00 GMT	Coyle (yellow card) 31'; McConville 75'	Report	Smith (yellow card) 34'	Stadium: Crown Ground; Attendance: 4,870; Referee: Andrew Kitchen

1 January 2022 24	Rotherham United	2–1	Bolton Wanderers	Rotherham
15:00 GMT	Smith 40', 74'; Ogbene (yellow card) 53'; Edmonds-Green (yellow card) 84'	Report	Doyle 42'; Afolayan (yellow card) 43'; Dixon (yellow card) 68'; Santos (yellow card) 83'	Stadium: AESSEAL New York Stadium; Attendance: 9,736; Referee: Geoff Eltringham

15 January 2022 25	Fleetwood Town	1–0	Rotherham United	Fleetwood
15:00 GMT	Johnson (yellow card) 7'; Clarke (yellow card) 65'; Pilkington 90+5'	Report		Stadium: Highbury Stadium; Attendance: 3,385; Referee: Robert Lewis

22 January 2022 26	Rotherham United	1–0	Cheltenham Town	Rotherham
15:00 GMT	Smith 24'	Report	Boyle (yellow card) 31'; Nlundulu (yellow card) 38'; Sercombe (yellow card) 86'; Thomas (yellow card) 90+9'	Stadium: AESSEAL New York Stadium; Attendance: 9,187; Referee: Oliver Langford

29 January 2022 27	Crewe Alexandra	0–2	Rotherham United	Crewe
15:00 GMT	Johnson (yellow card) 33'; Robertson (yellow card) 68' (yellow-red card) 73'; Sass-Davies (yellow card) 78'	Report	Smith 7'; Ihiekwe (yellow card) 25'; Wood (yellow card) 45+3'; Richards 74' (o.g.)	Stadium: Mornflake Stadium; Attendance: 5,014; Referee: Ben Speedie

1 February 2022 28	Doncaster Rovers	0–5	Rotherham United	Doncaster
19:45 GMT	Younger (yellow card) 31'	Report	Miller 8'; Wiles 16'; Ogbene 72'; Barlaser 76' (pen.); Lindsay 89'	Stadium: Keepmoat Stadium; Attendance: 9,255; Referee: Scott Oldham

5 February 2022 29	Rotherham United	1–0	Accrington Stanley	Rotherham
15:00 GMT	Ferguson (yellow card) 20'; Rathbone (yellow card) 24'; Barlaser 57'; Smith (yellow card) 78'; Wood (red card) 87'	Report	Savin (yellow card) 45+1'; Rich-Baghuelou (yellow card) 50'; Hamilton (yellow card) 76'; Pell (penalty missed) 89'; McConville (yellow card) 90+4'	Stadium: Aesseal New York Stadium; Attendance: 8,593; Referee: Andy Woolmer

8 February 2022 30	AFC Wimbledon	0–1	Rotherham United	Wimbledon
19:45 GMT	Nightingale (yellow card) 47'; Marsh (yellow card) 90+6'	Report	Mattock (yellow card) 31'; Kayode 60'	Stadium: Plough Lane; Attendance: 6,387; Referee: Charles Breakspear

13 February 2022 31	Sheffield Wednesday	0–2	Rotherham United	Owlerton
12:00 GMT	Byers (yellow card) 64'; Hutchinson (yellow card) 72'	Report	Ladapo 59'; Smith 84'	Stadium: Hillsborough; Attendance: 26,418; Referee: Darren Drysdale

18 February 2022 32	Rotherham United	1–1	Wigan Athletic	Rotherham
19:45 GMT	Ihiekwe (yellow card) 73'; Rathbone 75'; Wiles (yellow card) 90+1'	Report	Humphrys 28'; McClean (yellow card) 52'; Lang (yellow card) 68'; Rea (yellow card) 90+4'; Massey (yellow card) 90+6'	Stadium: AESSEAL New York Stadium; Attendance: 10,588; Referee: Jeremy Simpson

22 February 2022 33	Rotherham United	2–0	Morecambe	Rotherham
19:45 GMT	Ladapo 4', 30'; Wiles (yellow card) 45+3'	Report	Bedeau (yellow card) 73'	Stadium: AESSEAL New York Stadium; Attendance: 8,376; Referee: Simon Mather

26 February 2022 34	Plymouth Argyle	0–1	Rotherham United	Plymouth
15:00 GMT	Camará (yellow card) 26'; Edwards (yellow card) 29'	Report	Barlaser (yellow card) 25'; Smith 63'; Rathbone (yellow card) 82'	Stadium: Home Park; Attendance: 14,193; Referee: Will Finnie

1 March 2022 35	Shrewsbury Town	0–0	Rotherham United	Shrewsbury
19:45 GMT	Pennington (yellow card) 41'	Report		Stadium: Montgomery Waters Meadow; Attendance: 5,111; Referee: Carl Brook

5 March 2022 36	Rotherham United	1–2	Milton Keynes Dons	Rotherham
15:00 GMT	Barlaser 25' (pen.); Rathbone (yellow card) 52'	Report	Harvie (red card) 24'; Lewington (yellow card) 26'; Darling 57'; Eisa 59'; Kasumu (yellow card) 81'	Stadium: AESSEAL New York Stadium; Attendance: 9,731; Referee: Marc Edwards

12 March 2022 37	Wycombe Wanderers	0–0	Rotherham United	High Wycombe
15:00 GMT	Stewart (yellow card) 90'	Report	Rathbone (yellow card) 76'; Ihiekwe (yellow card) 81'	Stadium: Adams Park; Attendance: 5,742; Referee: Craig Hicks

15 March 2022 38	Rotherham United	2–1	Lincoln City	Rotherham
19:45 GMT	Wiles 11'; Ogbene 13'; Rathbone (yellow card) 45+3'; Wood (yellow card) 70'	Report	Hopper (yellow card) 49', (goal) 81'; Walsh (yellow card) 82'	Stadium: AESSEAL New York Stadium; Attendance: 9,575; Referee: Chris Sarginson

19 March 2022 39	Rotherham United	0–3	Shrewsbury Town	Rotherham
15:00 GMT	Kayode (yellow card) 32'; MacDonald (red card) 38'	Report	Udoh (yellow card) 29', (goal) 36'; Bennett (yellow card) 76', (goal) 78'; Pennington (yellow card) 84'; Bowman 90+2'	Stadium: AESSEAL New York Stadium; Attendance: 9,253; Referee: Anthony Backhouse

9 April 2022 40	Rotherham United	0–1	Charlton Athletic	Rotherham
15:00 BST		Report	Famewo (yellow card) 43'; Dobson 55'	Stadium: AESSEAL New York Stadium; Attendance: 9,087; Referee: Ross Joyce

12 April 2022 41	Portsmouth	3–0	Rotherham United	Milton
19:45 BST	Robertson (yellow card) 5', (goal) 35'; Jacobs (yellow card) 45+3'; Harness 59'; Hirst 65'	Report	Lindsay (yellow card) 9'; Barlaser (yellow card) 16'; Mattock (yellow card) 56'	Stadium: Fratton Park; Attendance: 14,154; Referee: David Rock

16 April 2022 42	Rotherham United	1–0	Ipswich Town	Rotherham
12:30 BST	Edmonds-Green (yellow card) 63'; Smith 78'	Report	Burns (yellow card) 45'; Celina (yellow card) 45+4'; Norwood (yellow card) 47'; Woolfenden (yellow card) 56'; Aluko (yellow card) 65'	Stadium: AESSEAL New York Stadium; Attendance: 9,394; Referee: Peter Wright

19 April 2022 43	Burton Albion	2–0	Rotherham United	Burton upon Trent
19:45 BST	Borthwick-Jackson 3'; Kokolo (yellow card) 45'; Brayford 69'; Hamer (yellow card) 73'	Report	Wood (yellow card) 52'; Rathbone (yellow card) 68'	Stadium: Pirelli Stadium; Attendance: 3,537; Referee: Tom Reeves

23 April 2022 44	Rotherham United	2–1	Oxford United	Rotherham
15:00 BST	Harding (yellow card) 29'; Edmonds-Green 45+3'; Barlaser 66' (pen.). (yellow card) 72'; Osei-Tutu (yellow card) 83'	Report	Barlaser 10' (o.g.); Williams (yellow card) 20'; Taylor (yellow card) 44'	Stadium: AESSEAL New York Stadium; Attendance: 10,415; Referee: Charles Breakspear

26 April 2022 45	Sunderland	1–1	Rotherham United	Sunderland
19:45 BST	Matete (yellow card) 8'; Ihiekwe 88' (o.g.)	Report	Ihiekwe 17'; Rathbone (yellow card) 76'	Stadium: Stadium of Light; Attendance: 33,119; Referee: Bobby Madley

30 April 2022 46	Gillingham	0–2	Rotherham United	Gillingham
12:30 BST	O'Keefe (yellow card) 17'; Tutonda (yellow card) 21'; Thompson (yellow card) 71'	Report	Edmonds-Green 34'; Wood (yellow card) 55'; Harding (yellow card) 83'; Kelly 89', (yellow card) 90'	Stadium: MEMS Priestfield Stadium; Attendance: 8,542; Referee: Sam Barrott

=== FA Cup ===
Rotherham were drawn at home to Bromley in the first round, Stockport County in the second round and away to Queens Park Rangers in the third round.

6 November 2021 First round	Rotherham United	3–0	Bromley	Rotherham
15:00 GMT	Wiles 43'; Ladapo 45+2'; Bola (yellow card) 62'; Grigg 80'	Report	Trotter (yellow card) 29'; Mnoga (red card) 51'	Stadium: AESSEAL New York Stadium; Attendance: 4,064; Referee: Declan Bourne

3 December 2021 Second round	Rotherham United	1–0	Stockport County	Rotherham
19:45 GMT	Miller (yellow card) 38'; Smith (yellow card) 39', (goal) 43'; Ladapo (yellow card) 70'; Mattock (yellow card) 90+2'	Report	Collar (yellow card) 20'; Southam-Hales (yellow card) 60'; Sarcevic (yellow card) 87'	Stadium: AESSEAL New York Stadium; Attendance: 6,466; Referee: Ollie Yates

8 January 2022 Third round	Queens Park Rangers	1–1 (a.e.t.) (8–7 p)	Rotherham United	Shepherd's Bush
15:00 GMT	Johansen (yellow card) 16'; Dykes 115'	Report	Ihiekwe 98'; Lindsay (yellow card) 99'; Harding (yellow card) 110'	Stadium: Kiyan Prince Foundation Stadium; Referee: Michael Salisbury
	Penalties
	Dykes (penalty scored); Johansen (penalty scored); Gray (penalty scored); Dozzell (penalty missed); Adomah (penalty scored); Amos (penalty scored); Barbet (penalty scored); Dunne (penalty scored); Dickie (penalty scored)		Smith (penalty scored); Rathbone (penalty scored); Harding (penalty missed); Kayode (penalty scored); Odoffin (penalty scored); Lindsay (penalty scored); Bola (penalty scored); Ihiekwe (penalty scored); Ogbene (penalty missed)

=== EFL Cup ===
The Millers were drawn at home to Accrington Stanley in the first round.

10 August 2021 First round	Rotherham United	1–2	Accrington Stanley	Rotherham
19:45 BST	Sadlier 76'; Edmonds-Green (yellow card) 84'	Report	Charles 38'; Pritchard (yellow card) 62'; Rodgers (yellow card) 63'; Bishop 86'; Savin (yellow card) 90+4'	Stadium: AESSEAL New York Stadium; Attendance: 3,131; Referee: Will Finnie

=== EFL Trophy ===
Rotherham were drawn into Northern Group E alongside Doncaster Rovers, Manchester City U21s and Scunthorpe United. The group stage match dates were confirmed on July 9. In the knock-out stage, United were drawn away to Crewe Alexandra in the third round and at home to Cambridge United in the quarter-finals.

Pos	Div	Team	Pld	W	PW	PL	L	GF	GA	GD	Pts	Qualification
1	L1	Rotherham United	3	3	0	0	0	15	1	+14	9	Advance to Round 2
2	L1	Doncaster Rovers	3	2	0	0	1	5	9	−4	6	Advance to Round 2
3	ACA	Manchester City U21	3	1	0	0	2	4	7	−3	3	
4	L2	Scunthorpe United	3	0	0	0	3	3	10	−7	0	

Source: EFL.com

7 September 2021 Group game 1	Doncaster Rovers	0–6	Rotherham United	Doncaster
19:00 BST		Report	Miller 13'; Ladapo 15'; Jones 16' (o.g.); Mattock (yellow card) 30', (goal) 85'; Grigg 49'; Hull 67'	Stadium: Keepmoat Stadium; Attendance: 1,765; Referee: Ben Speedie

5 October 2021 Group game 2	Rotherham United	4–1	Scunthorpe United	Rotherham
19:00 BST	Grigg 8'; Ladapo 20'; Odoffin (yellow card) 54', (goal) 82'; Smith 90+1'	Report	Wood (yellow card) 30'; Millen (yellow card) 45+4'; Loft 65'	Stadium: AESSEAL New York Stadium; Attendance: 1,439; Referee: Andrew Kitchen

26 October 2021 Group game 3	Rotherham United	5–0	Manchester City U21	Rotherham
19:00 BST	Sadlier (yellow card) 27', (goal) 63' (pen.), 81', 90'; Kayode (yellow card) 38'; Durose (yellow card) 41'; Grigg 51'; Hull 66'; Warne (yellow card) 90+1'	Report	Charles (yellow card) 89'	Stadium: AESSEAL New York Stadium; Attendance: 1,908; Referee: Sam Barrott

30 November 2021 Second round	Rotherham United	1–1 (5–3 p)	Port Vale	Rotherham
19:00 GMT	Smith 56'	Report	Amoo 87'	Stadium: AESSEAL New York Stadium; Attendance: 1,560; Referee: Peter Wright
	Penalties
	Smith (penalty scored); Sadlier (penalty scored); Ferguson (penalty scored); Ladapo (penalty scored); Mattock (penalty scored)		Conlon (penalty scored); Walker (penalty scored); Rodney (penalty scored); Amoo (penalty missed)

4 January 2022 Third round	Crewe Alexandra	2–4	Rotherham United	Crewe
19:00 GMT	Mandron 11'; Robertson 71'	Report	Harding (yellow card) 29'; Sadlier 41'; Smith 57'; Kayode 82'; Ladapo 90+4'	Stadium: Mornflake Stadium; Referee: Rebecca Welch

25 January 2022 Quarter-finals	Rotherham United	1–1 (7–6 p)	Cambridge United	Rotherham
19:00 GMT	Harding (yellow card) 6', (goal) 9'	Report	Digby 40'	Stadium: AESSEAL New York Stadium; Attendance: 2,239; Referee: Martin Coy
	Penalties
	Ferguson (penalty scored); Ladapo (penalty scored); Miller (penalty scored); Wiles (penalty scored); Mattock (penalty scored); Lindsay (penalty scored); Ihiekwe (penalty scored)		Smith (penalty scored); Dunk (penalty scored); Brophy (penalty scored); Williams (penalty scored); Knibbs (penalty scored); Mitov (penalty scored); May (penalty missed)

9 March 2022 Semi-finals	Hartlepool United	2–2 (4–5 p)	Rotherham United	Hartlepool
19:45 GMT	Grey 29'; Byrne (yellow card) 32'; Molyneux 55'	Report	Wood (yellow card) 23'; Edmonds-Green (yellow card) 40'; Osei-Tutu (yellow card) 45+2'; Smith 50', 63'; MacDonald (yellow card) 90+4'	Stadium: Suit Direct Stadium; Attendance: 7,532; Referee: Bobby Madley
	Penalties
	Featherstone (penalty scored); Sterry (penalty scored); Shelton (penalty scored); Molyneux (penalty missed); Bogle (penalty scored); Crawford (penalty missed)		Smith (penalty scored); Ferguson (penalty scored); Barlaser (penalty scored); Wiles (penalty missed); MacDonald (penalty scored); Miller (penalty scored)

3 April 2022 Final	Rotherham United	4–2 (a.e.t.)	Sutton United	Wembley
15:00 BST	Wiles (yellow card) 15' (goal) 42'; Osei-Tutu 90+6'; Ogbene 96'; Ihiekwe 112'	Report	Wilson 30'; Eastmond 48'; John (yellow card) 86'; Kizzi (yellow card) 92'	Stadium: Wembley Stadium; Attendance: 30,688; Referee: Seb Stockbridge

== Transfers ==
=== Transfers in ===
Date	Position	Nationality	Name	From	Fee	Ref.
14 July 2021	GK	(England)	Josh Chapman	(England) Sheffield United	Free transfer	
20 July 2021	LM	(Northern Ireland)	Shane Ferguson	Free agent	Free transfer	
3 August 2021	CM	(England)	Hakeem Odoffin	(Scotland) Hamilton Academical	Undisclosed	
4 August 2021	CM	(England)	Oliver Rathbone	(England) Rochdale	Undisclosed	
10 August 2021	LB	(England)	Tolaji Bola	(England) Arsenal	Undisclosed	
28 January 2022	CF	(Republic of Ireland)	Georgie Kelly	(Republic of Ireland) Bohemians	Free transfer	

=== Loans in ===
Date from	Position	Nationality	Name	From	Date until	Ref.
4 August 2021	CB	(England)	Rarmani Edmonds-Green	(England) Huddersfield Town	End of season	
31 August 2021	CF	(Northern Ireland)	Will Grigg	(England) Sunderland	End of season	
31 January 2022	RB	(England)	Jordi Osei-Tutu	(England) Arsenal	End of season	

=== Loans out ===
Date from	Position	Nationality	Name	To	Date until	Ref.
14 August 2021	LW	(England)	Jacob Gratton	(England) Guiseley	4 January 2022	
14 August 2021	CB	(England)	Jake Hull	(England) Guiseley	4 January 2022	
20 August 2021	CF	(England)	Jerome Greaves	(England) Matlock Town	5 January 2022	
31 August 2021	CB	(Jamaica)	Curtis Tilt	(England) Wigan Athletic	14 January 2021	
10 September 2021	CB	(Republic of Ireland)	Jake Cooper	(England) Darlington	1 January 2022	
4 December 2021	GK	(England)	Josh Chapman	(England) Frickley Athletic	3 January 2022	
7 January 2022	CF	(England)	Jerome Greaves	(England) Farsley Celtic	End of season	
8 January 2022	GK	(England)	Josh Chapman	(England) Frickley Athletic	February 2022	
10 January 2022	CB	(England)	Jake Hull	(England) Hartlepool United	End of season	
1 February 2022	CB	(Republic of Ireland)	Jake Cooper	(England) Altrincham	End of season	
11 February 2022	RW	(England)	Jacob Gratton	(England) Farsley Celtic	End of season	

=== Transfers out ===
Date	Position	Nationality	Name	To	Fee	Ref.
30 June 2021	RB	(England)	Billy Jones		Released	
30 June 2021	CF	(England)	Ethan Kenny	(England) Frickley Athletic	Free transfer	
30 June 2021	CM	(Wales)	Shaun MacDonald	(England) Crewe Alexandra	Released	
30 June 2021	RB	(United States)	Matthew Olosunde	(England) Preston North End	Rejected contract	
30 June 2021	CF	(England)	Jamie Proctor	(England) Port Vale	Released	
30 June 2021	CB	(Scotland)	Clark Robertson	(England) Portsmouth	Released	
30 June 2021	CF	(Northern Ireland)	Kyle Vassell		Released	
9 July 2021	LB	(Republic of Ireland)	Trevor Clarke	(England) Bristol Rovers	Undisclosed	
23 July 2021	CM	(England)	Matt Crooks	(England) Middlesbrough	Undisclosed	
25 January 2022	CB	(Jamaica)	Curtis Tilt	(England) Wigan Athletic	Undisclosed	
28 January 2022	LW	(Republic of Ireland)	Kieran Sadlier	(England) Bolton Wanderers	Undisclosed	
