= Jake Cooper (footballer, born 2001) =

English association football player (born 2001)

Personal information
- Date of birth: 2 January 2001 (age 25)
- Place of birth: Burnley, England
- Height: 6 ft 0 in (1.84 m)
- Position: Defender

Team information
- Current team: Altrincham
- Number: 5

Youth career
- –2015: Sheffield United
- 2015–2019: Rotherham United

Senior career*
Years	Team	Apps	(Gls)
2019–2022	Rotherham United	0	(0)
2019–2020	→ Gateshead (loan)	14	(2)
2020–2021	→ Gateshead (loan)	12	(0)
2021	→ Hartlepool United (loan)	2	(0)
2021–2022	→ Darlington (loan)	11	(3)
2022	→ Altrincham (loan)	12	(1)
2022–	Altrincham	106	(5)
2023	→ Darlington (loan)	12	(0)
- * Club domestic league appearances and goals as of 23:01, 25 April 2026 (UTC)

Jake Cooper (born 2 January 2001), also known as Jake Southern-Cooper, is an English professional footballer who plays as a defender for the National League club Altrincham.

Cooper began his career with Sheffield United before joining Rotherham United's academy. He made his senior debut in the 2019–20 EFL Trophy, and spent time on loan at Gateshead, Hartlepool United and Darlington, before joining Altrincham, also on loan, in February 2022. Cooper was born in England and has been involved with Republic of Ireland squads at youth level.

== Life and career ==
Cooper was born in 2001 in Burnley, Lancashire, and raised in Sheffield, South Yorkshire. He was on the books of Sheffield United as a striker until the under-14s, but played as a centre back for Sheffield Boys and it was in that position that he joined Rotherham United in 2015. He took up a two-year scholarship in 2017. With several first-team players unavailable through injury or suspension, Cooper was named among the substitutes for the EFL Championship match at home to Preston North End on 1 January 2019, but remained unused.

Cooper signed a one-year professional contract in June 2019, and made his senior debut as a starter in the EFL Trophy against Manchester United U21 in August. He played twice more in the EFL Trophy, and was an unused substitute in four cup ties and six League One matches, before joining National League North club Gateshead on an initial one-month loan on 7 December.

He made his debut the same day, "slott[ing] in seamlessly at the back" in a 3–5–2 formation as Gateshead beat Alfreton Town 3–1 to secure their first win in six attempts. After the loan was extended to the end of the season, he scored his first goal "with a finish a seasoned striker would have been delighted with" on 1 February 2020 as Gateshead beat Leamington 4–2 to climb into the play-off positions. Player-manager and defensive partner Mike Williamson highlighted how Cooper "fitted perfectly into a back three, [and] has been very consistent", rating him a Championship player in the making. Rotherham extended Cooper's contract by two years in March 2020 before allowing him to return to Gateshead in July for the play-offs. He opened the scoring in the quarter-final in first-half stoppage time, but Brackley Town's Shane Byrne equalised from his own half immediately following the kick-off. Cooper converted his kick as Gateshead won 6–5 on penalties, but they lost in the semi-finals to Boston United.

Cooper returned to Gateshead for the first half of the 2020–21 season, made 13 appearances, and expressed gratitude for the regular football that he felt had "improved [him] massively". He was an unused substitute in one Championship match for Rotherham before joining National League club Hartlepool United on loan in early March. Manager Dave Challinor made it clear that he was there as cover, and hoped "we don't need him too much for the foreseeable future". This proved to be the case, as he made only two appearances from a possible twenty.

In August 2021, he signed on loan at Darlington. The team had started the National North season poorly defensively, and Cooper made what manager Alun Armstrong called an outstanding start to his Darlington career. However, his desire for regular football was soon thwarted when he was sent off against York City and the resulting three-match ban was upheld on appeal. He had an eventful game against Kettering Town on 6 November: attempting to head the ball back to his goalkeeper after 8 minutes, he placed it over him for an own goal, gave his side the lead after 64, also with a header, and was fouled for a late penalty, converted by Will Hatfield to complete a 3–1 win.

On 1 February 2022, Cooper signed an initial month's loan with National League club Altrincham, to reinforce the team's "leaky" defence. The loan was extended to the end of the season, and he made 12 appearances (11 starts) and scored once, in a 5–0 defeat of Weymouth, showing himself to be "solid and reliable defensively, and comfortable bringing the ball forward". Cooper was released by Rotherham United at the end of the 2021–22 season, and then rejoined Altrincham on a permanent basis.

After injury interrupted his progress at Altrincham, Cooper rejoined Darlington on a month's loan on 24 February 2023. After five starts in the first month, Cooper's loan was extended to the end of the season, and he made twelve appearances in total.

On 31 May 2026, the club announced the player's contract had been extended to the end of the 2026/27 season.

== Career statistics ==
As of match played 25 April 2026

Appearances and goals by club, season and competition
Club	Season	League			FA Cup		EFL Cup		Other		Total	
Club	Season	Division	Apps	Goals	Apps	Goals	Apps	Goals	Apps	Goals	Apps	Goals
Rotherham United	2018–19	Championship	0	0	0	0	0	0	—		0	0
Rotherham United	2019–20	League One	0	0	0	0	0	0	3 (Note: Appearances in EFL Trophy)	0	3	0
Rotherham United	2020–21	Championship	0	0	0	0	0	0	—		0	0
Rotherham United	2021–22	League One	0	0	—		0	0	0	0	0	0
Rotherham United	Total		0	0	0	0	0	0	3	0	3	0
Gateshead (loan)	2019–20	National League North	14	2	—		—		2 (Note: Appearances in National League North play-offs)	1	16	3
Gateshead (loan)	2020–21	National League North	12	0	—		—		1 (Note: Appearance(s) in FA Trophy)	0	13	0
Gateshead (loan)	Total		26	2	—		—		3	1	29	3
Hartlepool United (loan)	2020–21	National League	2	0	—		—		0	0	2	0
Darlington (loan)	2021–22	National League North	11	3	2	0	—		1	0	14	3
Altrincham (loan)	2021–22	National League	12	1	—		—		—		12	1
Altrincham	2022–23	National League	13	1	2	0	—		0	0	15	1
Altrincham	2023–24	National League	40	2	1	0	—		3 (Note: Two appearances in FA Trophy, one in National League play-offs)	0	44	2
Altrincham	2024–25	National League	24	0	0	0	—		7 (Note: Two appearances in FA Trophy, five in National League Cup)	0	31	0
Altrincham	2025–26	National League	29	2	1	0	—		1	0	31	2
Altrincham	Total		118	6	4	0	—		10	0	122	6
Darlington (loan)	2022–23	National League North	12	0	—		—		—		12	0
Career total			169	11	6	0	0	0	18	1	193	12
