= Michael Smith (footballer, born 1991) =

English footballer (born 1991)

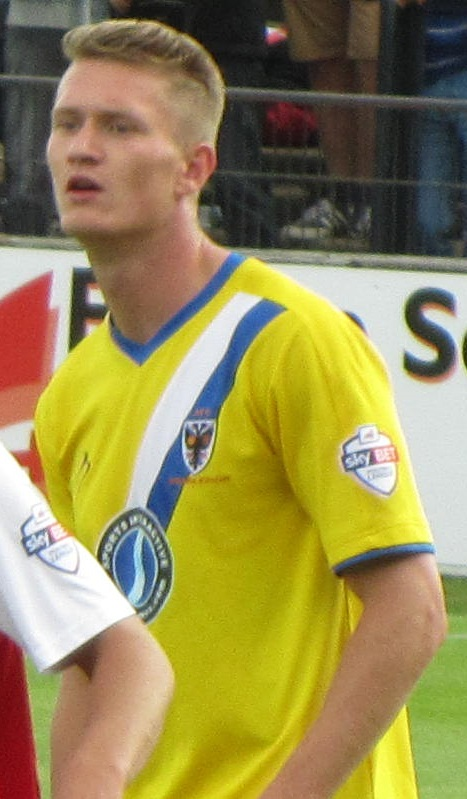
- Smith playing for AFC Wimbledon in 2013

Personal information
- Full name: Michael John Smith
- Date of birth: 17 October 1991 (age 35)
- Place of birth: Wallsend, England
- Height: 6 ft 3 in (1.91 m)
- Position: Striker

Team information
- Current team: Mansfield Town
- Number: 14

Youth career
- Whitley Bay Boys Club

Senior career*
Years	Team	Apps	(Gls)
2010–2011	Darlington	37	(6)
2010	→ Workington (loan)	6	(0)
2011–2014	Charlton Athletic	0	(0)
2012	→ Accrington Stanley (loan)	6	(3)
2012	→ Newport County (loan)	9	(4)
2013	→ Colchester United (loan)	8	(2)
2013–2014	→ AFC Wimbledon (loan)	23	(9)
2014–2016	Swindon Town	65	(21)
2015–2016	→ Barnsley (loan)	13	(0)
2016	→ Portsmouth (loan)	16	(4)
2016–2017	Portsmouth	18	(3)
2017	→ Northampton Town (loan)	14	(2)
2017–2018	Bury	19	(1)
2018–2022	Rotherham United	188	(52)
2022–2025	Sheffield Wednesday	111	(29)
2025–2026	Preston North End	37	(3)
2026–	Mansfield Town	10	(6)
- * Club domestic league appearances and goals as of 14:36, 25 October 2026 (UTC)

Michael John Smith (born 17 October 1991) is an English professional footballer who plays as a striker for EFL League One club Mansfield Town.

== Career ==
=== Darlington ===
Born in Wallsend, Tyne and Wear, Smith made his debut in the Football League on 5 April 2010, replacing Chris Moore in the 77th minute of Darlington's 1–0 home defeat by Hereford United in League Two. He scored his first Football League goal on 1 May, in the 79th minute of Darlington's 2–0 away win at Macclesfield Town.

He joined Conference North club Workington on loan for a month on 29 October 2010, and made seven appearances before returning to Darlington. In his first four Conference matches back with Darlington he scored six goals. At the end of the season, he, Phil Gray and John McReady all signed new two-year contracts.

=== Charlton ===
After trials with Watford and Stoke City, and an unsuccessful bid of £80,000 from Bristol City, Smith signed a three-year contract with League One club Charlton Athletic on 31 August 2011; the fee was undisclosed He made his Charlton debut against FC Halifax Town in the FA Cup: he came on in the 87th minute and crossed for Bradley Pritchard to score the fourth goal of the match.

On 18 January 2012, Smith joined League Two club Accrington Stanley on loan to the end of the season. Ten days later, he scored a hat-trick and provided an assist for Luke Joyce as Stanley beat Gillingham 4–3. He returned to his parent club in mid-March after suffering a season-ending knee injury.

On 14 August 2012, Smith made his first start – and what proved to be last appearance – for Charlton Athletic in a League Cup defeat to Leyton Orient. He then began a series of loan spells. In November, he joined Newport County of the Conference Premier on a one-month loan, and scored against Cambridge United on his debut. The loan was extended for a second month. On 8 March 2013, he joined League One club Colchester United, also for a month.

In July 2013, Smith signed for League Two club AFC Wimbledon on loan until 1 January 2014. Wearing the number 9 shirt, he made his debut on the opening day of the 2013–14 season in a 1–1 draw with Torquay United. He was a regular in the side, finishing his loan period with 10 goals from 25 appearances.

=== Swindon Town ===
On 22 January 2014, Smith signed for Swindon Town for an initial £100,000. He scored Swindon's first and third goals as they beat Shrewsbury Town 3–1 on his debut three days later.

=== Portsmouth ===
On the final day of the January 2016 transfer window, Smith joined League Two club Portsmouth on a three-month loan. The move was made permanent at the end of the season for an undisclosed fee. He scored a hat-trick against Yeovil Town in an EFL Trophy tie on 30 August, though Portsmouth lost the match 4–3.

=== Bury ===
On 31 August 2017, Smith signed a two-year contract with Bury of League One.

=== Rotherham United ===
On 11 January 2018, Smith signed for fellow League One club Rotherham United for an undisclosed fee.

After an impressive month in which he scored five goals, assisting two others in five matches, Smith was awarded the EFL League One Player of the Month Award for October 2021. Smith won the award for the second time in the season for January 2022 after scoring four of Rotherham's five goals across the month with the fifth being an own goal deflected in from his shot.

He was named as the side's Player of the Season for 2021–22, having scored 24 goals in all competitions at the time of the award.

=== Sheffield Wednesday ===
On 22 June 2022, it was announced that Smith had joined Sheffield Wednesday on a free transfer following the expiry of his Rotherham United contract. Smith made his Wednesday debut, against Portsmouth on 30 July 2022 coming off the bench for George Byers. His first goal would come against Bradford City in the EFL Trophy from the penalty spot. Following his first goal he would score back-to-back League One goals against Morecambe and Ipswich Town which would see him win Wednesday's September player of the month award.

He won the EFL Goal of the Month competition for October 2024, for his 25-yard strike against Portsmouth. The following month he won the clubs player of the month trophy for November, after scoring goals against Watford and Hull City. Following the end of the 2024–25 season an option was taken on his contract.

On 17 July 2025, it was confirmed that Smith's contract had been terminated by mutual consent.

=== Preston North End ===
On 22 July, Smith signed a two-year contract with Championship side Preston North End. He made his debut on the opening day of the season, starting the game in a 1–1 draw against Queens Park Rangers.

=== Mansfield Town ===
On 13 July, Smith signed a two-year contract with League One club Mansfield Town.

== Career statistics ==
As of 21 October 2026

Appearances and goals by club, season and competition
Club	Season	League			FA Cup		League Cup		Other		Total	
Club	Season	Division	Apps	Goals	Apps	Goals	Apps	Goals	Apps	Goals	Apps	Goals
Darlington	2009–10	League Two	7	1	0	0	0	0	0	0	7	1
Darlington	2010–11	Blue Square Premier	29	5	0	0	0	0	0	0	29	5
Darlington	2011–12	Conference Premier	1	0	—		—		—		1	0
Darlington	Total		37	6	0	0	0	0	0	0	37	6
Workington	2010–11	Conference North	6	0	—		—		1 (Note: Appearance in FA Trophy)	0	7	0
Charlton Athletic	2011–12	League One	0	0	1	0	0	0	0	0	1	0
Charlton Athletic	2012–13	Championship	0	0	0	0	1	0	—		1	0
Charlton Athletic	2013–14	Championship	0	0	—		—		—		0	0
Charlton Athletic	Total		0	0	1	0	1	0	0	0	2	0
Accrington Stanley (loan)	2011–12	League Two	6	3	—		—		—		6	3
Newport County (loan)	2012–13	Conference Premier	9	4	—		—		1	0	10	0
Colchester United (loan)	2012–13	League One	8	2	—		—		—		8	2
AFC Wimbledon (loan)	2013–14	League Two	23	9	1	1	0	0	1 (Note: Appearances in Football League Trophy)	0	25	10
Swindon Town	2013–14	League One	20	8	—		0	0	0	0	20	8
Swindon Town	2014–15	League One	40	13	1	0	2	2	4 (Note: One appearance and one goal in Football League Trophy, three appearances and two goals in League One play-offs)	3	47	18
Swindon Town	2015–16	League One	5	0	—		0	0	—		5	0
Swindon Town	Total		65	21	1	0	2	2	4	3	72	26
Barnsley (loan)	2015–16	League One	13	0	0	0	—		0	0	13	0
Portsmouth (loan)	2015–16	League Two	16	4	—		—		—		16	4
Portsmouth	2016–17	League Two	18	3	0	0	0	0	3 (Note: Appearances in EFL Trophy)	3	21	6
Portsmouth	Total		34	7	0	0	0	0	3	3	37	10
Northampton Town (loan)	2016–17	League One	14	2	—		—		—		14	2
Bury	2017–18	League One	19	1	2	1	0	0	2	0	23	2
Rotherham United	2017–18	League One	20	6	—		—		3 (Note: Appearances in League One play-offs)	0	23	6
Rotherham United	2018–19	Championship	45	8	1	0	0	0	—		46	8
Rotherham United	2019–20	League One	34	9	3	3	2	0	2 (Note: Appearance(s) in 2019–20 EFL Trophy.)	0	41	12
Rotherham United	2020–21	Championship	44	10	1	0	1	0	—		46	10
Rotherham United	2021–22	League One	45	19	2	1	1	0	6 (Note: Appearances and goals in 2021–22 EFL Trophy.)	5	54	25
Rotherham United	Total		188	52	7	4	4	0	11	5	210	61
Sheffield Wednesday	2022–23	League One	39	17	5	2	1	0	4 (Note: One appearance and one goal in Football League Trophy, three appearances and one goal in League One play-offs)	2	49	21
Sheffield Wednesday	2023–24	Championship	31	4	2	0	1	0	—		34	4
Sheffield Wednesday	2024–25	Championship	41	8	0	0	3	0	—		44	8
Sheffield Wednesday	Total		111	29	7	2	5	0	4	2	127	33
Preston North End	2025–26	Championship	37	3	1	0	2	0	—		40	3
Mansfield Town	2026–27	League One	9	5	0	0	1	0	1 (Note: Appearances and goals in 2026–27 EFL Trophy.)	0	11	5
Career total			577	139	20	8	15	2	27	13	633	160

== Honours ==
Portsmouth

- EFL League Two: 2016–17

Rotherham United

- EFL League One runner-up: 2021–22; play-offs: 2018
- EFL Trophy: 2021–22

Sheffield Wednesday

- EFL League One play-offs: 2023

Individual

- EFL League One Player of the Month: October 2021, January 2022
- Rotherham United Player of the Season: 2021–22
- EFL League One Team of the Year: 2021–22
