= Jacob Gratton =

English footballer

Personal information
- Full name: Jacob George Gratton
- Date of birth: 5 January 2002 (age 24)
- Place of birth: Rotherham, England
- Height: 1.82 m (6 ft 0 in)
- Position: Midfielder

Team information
- Current team: Worksop Town

Youth career
- 2011–2020: Rotherham United

Senior career*
| Years | Team | Apps | (Gls) |
| 2020–2022 | Rotherham United | 0 | (0) |
| 2020 | → Scarborough Athletic (loan) | 1 | (0) |
| 2021–2022 | → Guiseley (loan) | 16 | (0) |
| 2022 | → Farsley Celtic (loan) | 17 | (1) |
| 2022 | Farsley Celtic | 7 | (0) |
| 2022–2023 | Belper Town | 21 | (2) |
| 2023–2024 | Whitby Town | 36 | (9) |
| 2024 | Belper Town | 4 | (1) |
| 2024– | Worksop Town | 12 | (2) |
- * Club domestic league appearances and goals as of 17:33, 25 November 2024 (UTC)

Jacob George Gratton (born 5 January 2002) is an English professional footballer who plays as a midfielder for Worksop Town.

== Club career ==
Gratton was born in Rotherham and joined his boyhood club Rotherham United at the age of nine. His first experience of first-team football came in January 2020, when he joined Scarborough Athletic on a youth loan. A cruciate injury in early February kept him on the sidelines for a year, returning in February 2021. In August 2021 he joined Guiseley on loan, returning in January 2022. During this loan spell, he was given permission to be part of the Rotherham United squad for the EFL Trophy, and made his club debut as a substitute in the 6–0 win against Doncaster Rovers on 7 September 2021. He joined Farsley Celtic on loan in February 2022, helping them avoid relegation. Gratton was released by Rotherham at the end of the 2021–22 season.

Following his release from Rotherham United, Gratton returned to Farsley Celtic on a permanent basis. In October 2022, he departed to join NPL Premier Division side Belper Town.

Following a season with Whitby Town, he returned to Belper Town in August 2024. The following month however, he joined Worksop Town having trained with the club in the prior pre-season.

== Career statistics ==
As of match played 3 September 2024.

Appearances and goals by club, season and competition
| Club | Season | League | | | FA Cup | | EFL Cup | | Other | | Total | |
| Club | Season | Division | Apps | Goals | Apps | Goals | Apps | Goals | Apps | Goals | Apps | Goals |
|---|---|---|---|---|---|---|---|---|---|---|---|---|
| Rotherham United | 2021–22 | League One | 0 | 0 | 0 | 0 | 0 | 0 | 2 (Note: Appearances in the EFL Trophy) | 0 | 2 | 0 |
| Guiseley (loan) | 2021–22 | National League North | 16 | 0 | 3 | 0 | – | | 0 | 0 | 19 | 0 |
| Farsley Celtic (loan) | 2021–22 | National League North | 17 | 1 | 0 | 0 | – | | 0 | 0 | 17 | 1 |
| Farsley Celtic | 2022–23 | National League North | 7 | 0 | 2 | 0 | — | | 0 | 0 | 9 | 0 |
| Belper Town | 2022–23 | NPL Premier Division | 21 | 2 | 0 | 0 | — | | 2 (Note: One appearance, one goal in FA Trophy and one appearance in Derbyshire Senior Cup) | 1 | 23 | 3 |
| Whitby Town | 2023–24 | NPL Premier Division | 36 | 9 | 6 | 3 | — | | 4 (Note: One appearance and one goal in FA Trophy, three appearances in North Riding Senior Cup) | 1 | 46 | 13 |
| Belper Town | 2024–25 | NPL Division One East | 4 | 1 | 3 | 2 | — | | 0 | 0 | 7 | 3 |
| Career total | | | 102 | 13 | 14 | 5 | 0 | 0 | 8 | 2 | 124 | 20 |
