= Shane Ferguson =

Northern Irish footballer (born 1991)

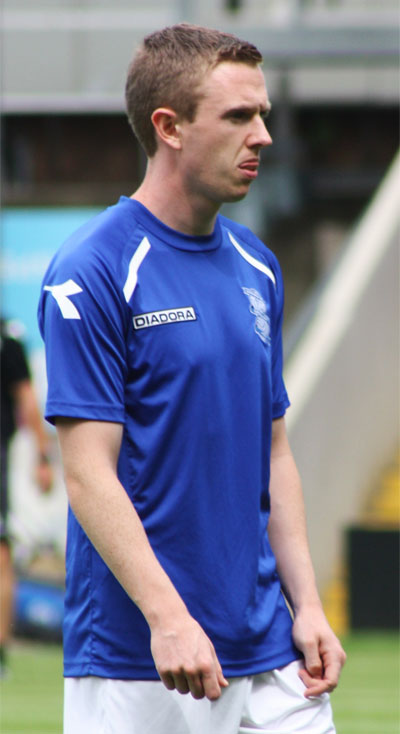
- With Birmingham City in 2013 pre-season

Personal information
- Full name: Shane Kevin Ferguson
- Date of birth: 12 July 1991 (age 35)
- Place of birth: Derry, Northern Ireland
- Height: 5 ft 10 in (1.78 m)
- Positions: Left back; left winger

Team information
- Current team: Blyth Town

Youth career
- 2001–2007: Maiden City Academy
- 2007–2009: Newcastle United

Senior career*
Years	Team	Apps	(Gls)
2009–2016	Newcastle United	23	(0)
2013	→ Birmingham City (loan)	11	(1)
2013–2014	→ Birmingham City (loan)	18	(0)
2015	→ Rangers (loan)	0	(0)
2015–2016	→ Millwall (loan)	25	(2)
2016–2021	Millwall	155	(5)
2021–2024	Rotherham United	73	(4)
2025	Derry City	13	(0)
2026	Morpeth Town	9	(0)
2026–	Blyth Town	0	(0)

International career^{‡}
2007–2008	Northern Ireland U17	8	(0)
2008–2009	Northern Ireland U19	16	(3)
2008–2012	Northern Ireland U21	11	(0)
2009	Northern Ireland B	1	(0)
2009–2023	Northern Ireland	57	(2)
- * Club domestic league appearances and goals as of 09:54, 5 September 2026 (UTC) ‡ National team caps and goals as of 20:13, 23 March 2023 (UTC)

Shane Kevin Ferguson (born 12 July 1991) is a Northern Irish professional footballer who plays for Blyth Town. He is capable of playing anywhere on the left flank as a full back or winger.

He previously played for Newcastle United in the Premier League, where he had two spells on loan to Birmingham City of the English Championship, as well as Rangers of the Scottish Championship and Scottish Professional Football League and Millwall of the EFL Championship. He then spent five and a half seasons with Millwall, three with Rotherham United and one with Derry City. He represented the Northern Ireland national team.

== Early life ==
Born in Derry, Ferguson began playing youth football for his hometown club, Maiden City, and Gaelic football for Derry GAA. After finishing his GCSEs at St Mary's High School, he moved to England where he was offered a scholarship at the Newcastle United Academy.

== Club career ==
=== Newcastle United ===
Ferguson joined the Newcastle United youth system in July 2007. In June 2009, he signed a new three-year contract.

Ferguson made his first team debut at left back on 25 August 2010, in a League Cup tie away at Accrington Stanley. He then played in the next round of the League Cup, on 22 September, away at Chelsea and he assisted in the first goal in the 4–3 win. He made his Premier League debut on 5 January 2011 against West Ham United as a second-half substitute. He made his first Premier League start against Wolverhampton Wanderers on 2 April 2011. Ferguson signed a new five-year contract on 27 May 2011, having made a good impression in the final part of the season.

A lengthy lay off due to a pre-season ankle ligament injury sustained against Darlington meant the young full back was unable to travel with the first team to a pre-season tournament in the United States. After appearing in the League Cup second round against Nottingham Forest, he made his first Premier League appearance on 10 December 2011, as a late substitute for Davide Santon.

In the early months of the 2012–13 season Ferguson assisted a number of goals for strikers Demba Ba and Papiss Cissé and produced some quality crosses from the left wing.

==== Loans to Birmingham City, Rangers and Millwall ====
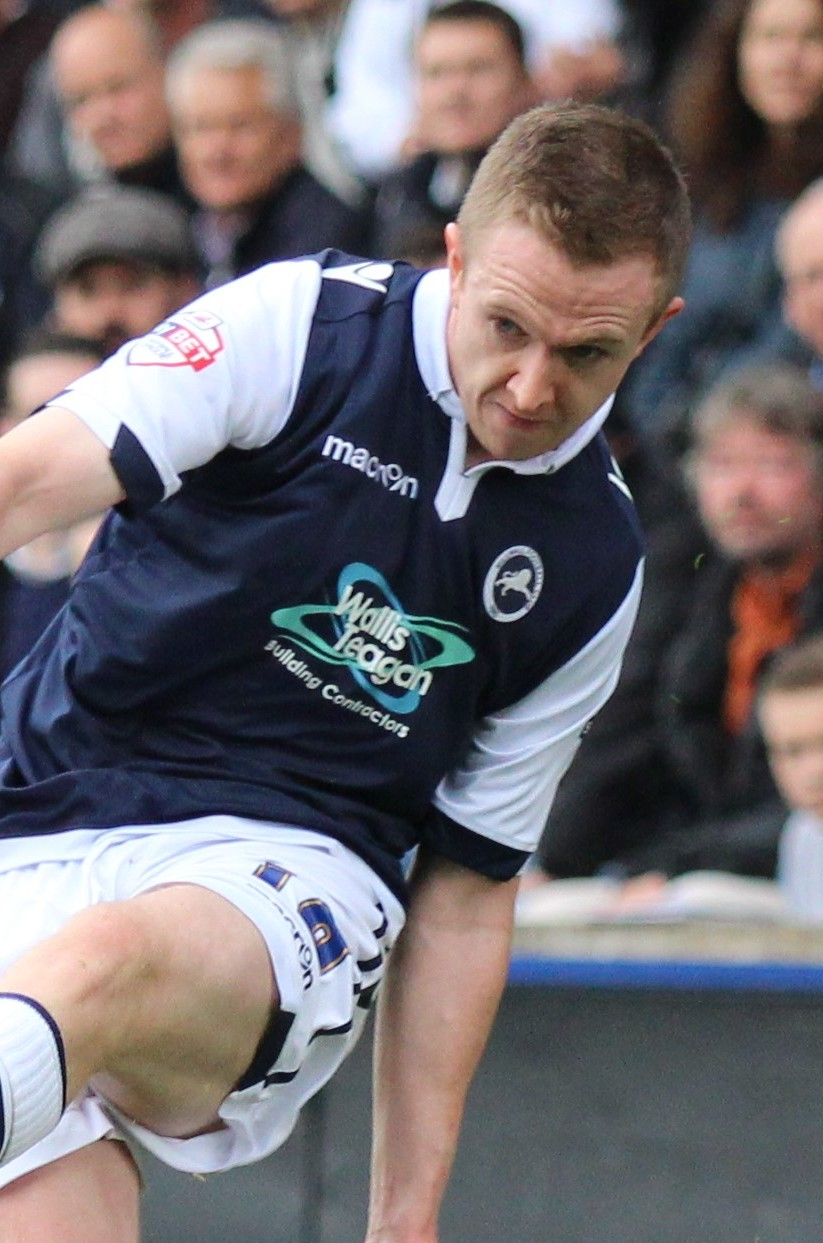
Ferguson playing for Millwall in 2015

In late February 2013, Ferguson joined Championship club Birmingham City on loan until 1 April. He scored his first goal for the club, and his first senior competitive goal, with a free kick from just outside the penalty area, to complete Birmingham's 4–0 away win against Crystal Palace on 29 March. His loan was extended until the end of the season, and he made 11 appearances before returning to Newcastle.

In July 2013, Ferguson rejoined Birmingham on loan for the season. He played regularly at the start of the season, but fell out of favour, and appeared only three times in the last three months of the season after the arrival of Liverpool's Jordon Ibe on loan.

Having made no first-team appearances in the first half of 2014–15, he was one of five Newcastle players to join Scottish Championship club Rangers on loan on 2 February 2015. He was still recovering from a knee ligament injury, and only regained fitness in time to make two appearances: as a second-half substitute in the first leg of the play-off final and as a starter in the second, as Rangers lost out to Motherwell.

Ferguson joined Millwall on loan on 7 August 2015 on a 92-day loan from parent club Newcastle. His debut came a day later in a 2–1 away win against Shrewsbury Town. On 1 September, Ferguson's loan spell at the club was extended until 9 January 2016. Ferguson scored his first Millwall goal in November 2015 against Colchester United. He made 24 appearances and scored 2 goals for Millwall before returning to Newcastle in January 2016.

=== Millwall ===
On 26 January 2016, Ferguson signed an eighteen-month contract with Millwall for an undisclosed fee. In May 2021, he was released from the club.

=== Rotherham United ===
On 20 July 2021, Ferguson signed a two-year contract (with the option of a third year) with Rotherham United. He made his debut in the first game of the 2021–22 season against Plymouth Argyle on 7 August 2021, coming on as a second-half substitute.

On 7 May 2024, after the club were relegated, Rotherham announced the player would be released in the summer after his contract expired.

=== Derry City ===
On 11 December 2024, Ferguson signed for League of Ireland Premier Division club Derry City ahead of their 2025 season. He made 14 appearances in all competitions during the season, before it was announced on 13 November 2025 that he would be leaving the club at the end of his contract.

=== Morpeth Town ===
On 27 February 2026, Ferguson joined Northern Premier League Premier Division club Morpeth Town.

=== Finn Harps ===
On 25 August 2026, it was announced Ferguson signed for League of Ireland First Division club Finn Harps on a short term deal until the end of the season. However, on 4 September 2026 it was revealed by Harps manager Patrick McEleney in a post-match interview that the signing had fallen through due to a registration issue.

== International career ==
Ferguson has been capped for the Northern Ireland national team at various youth levels. He made his senior debut when he came on as a substitute in a 3–0 friendly defeat to Italy on 6 June 2009. He was called up for the 2011 U21 European Championship qualifier against Germany on 13 November but did not leave the bench. Simultaneously, he had also been a regular in the U-19 squad in their bid to qualify for the 2010 European Championships and helped them to a place in the elite round. He played all three matches of that round, but Northern Ireland failed to win any of the games and finished at the bottom of their group.

In May 2011 it was reported that Northern Ireland manager Nigel Worthington believed that Ferguson would switch his allegiance to the Republic of Ireland after he failed to reply to telephone calls. In the months that followed, Ferguson did not comment on his future at international level. However, under-21 coach Steve Beaglehole later stated that he believed Ferguson never attempted to switch allegiances despite failing to respond to Worthington's calls as he had started in all the 2013 European Championship qualifiers from September onwards. In November, Ferguson ended the speculation by publicly committing his international future to Northern Ireland. On 20 February 2012 Ferguson was included in Michael O'Neill's first squad following his appointment as the Northern Ireland manager.

Ferguson scored his first goal for Northern Ireland in an international friendly versus Finland on 15 August 2012. A year later, he produced what O'Neill called "90 minutes of the really highest quality" as Northern Ireland beat Russia in a 2014 World Cup qualifier.

== Career statistics ==
=== Club ===
As of match played on 25 August 2026

Appearances and goals by club, season and competition
Club	Season	League			National cup (Note: Includes FA Cup, Scottish Cup & FAI Cup)		League cup (Note: Includes EFL Cup)		Other		Total	
Club	Season	Division	Apps	Goals	Apps	Goals	Apps	Goals	Apps	Goals	Apps	Goals
Newcastle United	2009–10	Championship	0	0	0	0	0	0	—		0	0
Newcastle United	2010–11	Premier League	7	0	0	0	2	0	—		9	0
Newcastle United	2011–12	Premier League	7	0	1	0	1	0	—		9	0
Newcastle United	2012–13	Premier League	9	0	0	0	1	0	4 (Note: Appearances in UEFA Europa League)	0	14	0
Newcastle United	2013–14	Premier League	0	0	—		—		—		0	0
Newcastle United	2014–15	Premier League	0	0	0	0	0	0	—		0	0
Newcastle United	2015–16	Premier League	0	0	—		—		—		0	0
Newcastle United	Total		23	0	1	0	4	0	4	0	32	0
Birmingham City (loan)	2012–13	Championship	11	1	—		—		—		11	1
Birmingham City (loan)	2013–14	Championship	18	0	2	0	3	0	—		23	0
Birmingham City (loan)	Total		29	1	2	0	3	0	—		34	1
Rangers (loan)	2014–15	Scottish Championship	0	0	0	0	—		2 (Note: Appearances in Scottish Championship play-offs)	0	2	0
Millwall	2015–16	League One	39	3	0	0	1	0	6 (Note: Three appearances in Football League Trophy, three in League One play-offs)	0	46	3
Millwall	2016–17	League One	40	2	6	2	2	0	4 (Note: One appearance in EFL Trophy, three in League One play-offs)	0	52	4
Millwall	2017–18	Championship	24	0	2	0	2	1	—		28	1
Millwall	2018–19	Championship	35	2	4	2	3	0	—		42	4
Millwall	2019–20	Championship	29	0	2	0	2	0	—		33	0
Millwall	2020–21	Championship	13	0	1	0	2	0	—		16	0
Millwall	Total		180	7	15	4	12	1	10	0	217	12
Rotherham United	2021–22	League One	32	1	2	0	1	0	5 (Note: Appearances in EFL Trophy)	0	40	1
Rotherham United	2022–23	Championship	32	3	1	0	1	0	—		34	3
Rotherham United	2023–24	Championship	9	0	0	0	0	0	—		9	0
Rotherham United	Total		73	4	3	0	2	0	5	0	83	4
Derry City	2025	LOI Premier Division	13	0	1	0	—		—		14	0
Morpeth Town	2025–26	NPL Premier Division	9	0	—		—		—		9	0
Career total			327	12	22	4	21	1	21	0	391	17

=== International ===
As of match played 23 March 2023

Appearances and goals by national team and year
National team	Year	Apps	Goals
Northern Ireland	2009	1	0
Northern Ireland	2012	5	1
Northern Ireland	2013	7	0
Northern Ireland	2014	5	0
Northern Ireland	2015	4	0
Northern Ireland	2016	8	0
Northern Ireland	2017	4	0
Northern Ireland	2018	3	0
Northern Ireland	2019	5	0
Northern Ireland	2020	4	0
Northern Ireland	2021	7	1
Northern Ireland	2022	3	0
Northern Ireland	2023	1	0
Total		57	2

Scores and results list Northern Ireland's goal tally first

International goals by date, venue, cap, opponent, score, result and competition
No.	Date	Venue	Cap	Opponent	Score	Result	Competition	Ref.
1	15 August 2012	Windsor Park, Belfast, Northern Ireland	4	Finland	1–0	3–3	Friendly	
2	5 September 2021	Lilleküla Stadium, Tallinn, Estonia	50	Estonia	1–0	1–0	Friendly	

== Honours ==
Millwall

- EFL League One play-offs: 2017

Rotherham United

- League One runner-up: 2021–22
- EFL Trophy: 2021–22
