= Daniel Barlaser =

Footballer (born 1997)

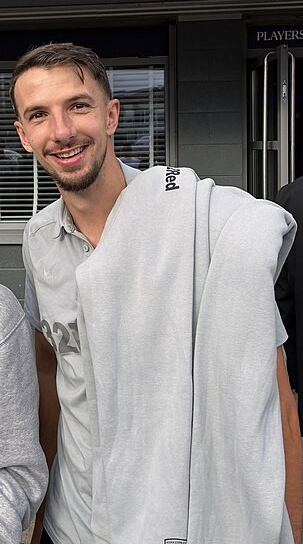
- Daniel Barlaser in 2025.

Personal information
- Full name: Daniel Tan Barlaser
- Date of birth: 18 January 1997 (age 29)
- Place of birth: Gateshead, England
- Height: 6 ft 0 in (1.84 m)
- Position: Defensive midfielder

Team information
- Current team: Milton Keynes Dons
- Number: 4

Youth career
- –2006: Swalwell Juniors
- 2006–2017: Newcastle United

Senior career*
Years	Team	Apps	(Gls)
2015–2020	Newcastle United	0	(0)
2018	→ Crewe Alexandra (loan)	4	(0)
2018–2019	→ Accrington Stanley (loan)	39	(1)
2019–2020	→ Rotherham United (loan)	27	(2)
2020–2023	Rotherham United	105	(14)
2023–2026	Middlesbrough	56	(1)
2025–2026	→ Hibernian (loan)	35	(0)
2026–	Milton Keynes Dons	0	(0)

International career
2012–2013	Turkey U16	9	(0)
2013–2014	Turkey U17	6	(0)
2015	England U18	2	(0)
- * Club domestic league appearances and goals as of 20 May 2026

Daniel Tan Barlaser (born 18 January 1997) is an English-Turkish professional footballer who plays as a defensive midfielder for EFL League One club Milton Keynes Dons.

== Club career ==
=== Early career ===
Living in Blaydon, Barlaser started his career at local youth team Swalwell Juniors as well as playing for the Hookergate Comprehensive school football team where he was educated before being signed by the Newcastle United academy in 2006.

After training with the first team squad, he was handed his first start for the club by manager Rafa Benítez on 18 January 2017 when he started the game in a 3–1 FA Cup win against Birmingham City. He continued his run in the team when he started against Oxford United in a 3–0 loss.

Barlaser made his debut in the EFL Cup in August 2017 against Nottingham Forest, a match they lost 3–2 after extra-time.

On 19 January 2018, he agreed to move on loan to Crewe Alexandra until the end of the season, and made his Crewe and Football League debut in a home league game against Wycombe Wanderers on 20 January 2018, coming on as a second-half substitute. On 9 April 2018, the loan spell was prematurely ended with Barlaser returning to Newcastle having made four appearances (all as substitutes).

In July 2019, Newcastle United announced that Barlaser extended his contract with the team and would join Rotherham United on loan for the 2019–20 season.

=== Rotherham United ===
On 2 October 2020, Barlaser completed a permanent move to Rotherham United for an undisclosed fee, on a three-year deal. Barlaser was awarded the EFL League One Player of the Month award for December 2021 after scoring four goals across the course of the month.

=== Middlesbrough ===
On 29 January 2023, Barlaser signed for Championship club Middlesbrough for an undisclosed fee. He moved on loan to Scottish Premiership club Hibernian on 1 September 2025. On 28 May 2026 Middlesbrough announced it was releasing the player.

=== Milton Keynes Dons ===
On 4 July 2026, Barlaser joined League One club Milton Keynes Dons on a free transfer, reuniting with former Rotherham United coach Paul Warne. He made his debut on 8 August 2026 in a 4–1 EFL Cup first round defeat away to Norwich City.

== International career ==
Despite being born in England, Barlaser qualified for Turkey through his father. He is a youth international for the Turkish Football Federation at the U16 and U17 levels.

On 1 June 2015, Barlaser was called up to the England U18s.

== Career statistics ==
As of 16 May 2026

Appearances and goals by club, season and competition
Club	Season	League			National Cup (Note: Includes FA Cup, Scottish Cup)		League Cup (Note: Includes EFL Cup, Scottish League Cup)		Other		Total	
Club	Season	Division	Apps	Goals	Apps	Goals	Apps	Goals	Apps	Goals	Apps	Goals
Newcastle United	2016–17	Championship	0	0	2	0	1	0	0	0	3	0
Newcastle United	2017–18	Premier League	0	0	0	0	0	0	0	0	0	0
Newcastle United	Total		0	0	2	0	1	0	0	0	3	0
Crewe Alexandra (loan)	2017–18	League Two	4	0	0	0	0	0	0	0	4	0
Accrington Stanley (loan)	2018–19	League One	39	1	4	1	0	0	2 (Note: Appearances in EFL Trophy)	1	45	3
Rotherham United (loan)	2019–20	League One	27	2	3	0	2	0	3	0	35	2
Rotherham United	2020–21	Championship	33	3	1	0	0	0	0	0	34	3
Rotherham United	2021–22	League One	44	9	3	0	1	0	4	0	52	9
Rotherham United	2022–23	Championship	28	2	1	0	2	0	0	0	31	2
Rotherham United	Total		105	14	5	0	3	0	4	0	117	14
Middlesbrough	2023–24	Championship	33	0	1	0	7	0	0	0	41	0
Middlesbrough	2024–25	Championship	23	1	1	0	2	0	0	0	26	1
Middlesbrough	Total		56	1	2	0	9	0	0	0	67	1
Hibernian (loan)	2025–26	Scottish Premiership	35	0	1	0	1	0	0	0	37	0
Milton Keynes Dons	2026–27	League One	0	0	0	0	1	0	0	0	0	0
Career total			266	18	17	1	16	0	9	1	308	20

== Honours ==
Rotherham United

- EFL League One runner-up: 2021–22
- EFL Trophy: 2021–22

Individual

- EFL League One Player of the Month: December 2021
- EFL League One Team of the Year: 2021–22
