= Freddie Ladapo =

English footballer (born 1993)

Personal information
- Full name: Olayinka Fredrick Oladotun Ladapo
- Date of birth: 1 February 1993 (age 33)
- Place of birth: Romford, England
- Height: 6 ft 1 in (1.85 m)
- Position: Forward

Youth career
- 2008–2010: Southend United
- 2010–2012: Colchester United

Senior career*
Years	Team	Apps	(Gls)
2011–2014	Colchester United	6	(0)
2011	→ Thurrock (loan)	2	(1)
2011	→ Chelmsford City (loan)	3	(0)
2012	→ Bishop's Stortford (loan)	3	(0)
2013	→ Woking (loan)	4	(0)
2013–2014	→ Nuneaton Town (loan)	6	(2)
2014	Kidderminster Harriers	3	(0)
2014	→ Hayes & Yeading United (Note: Although Soccerway credits Ladapo with three goals for Hayes & Yeading United, the team's official website states he only scored twice. The discrepancy occurs in the 15 April game against Dorchester Town – Soccerway credits the first goal to Ladapo, but the Hayes & Yeading United match report credits it to Frankie Merrifield. The video highlights of the game verify Merrifield as the goalscorer.) (loan)	16	(2)
2014–2015	→ Grays Athletic (loan)	26	(14)
2015–2016	Margate	53	(25)
2016–2018	Crystal Palace	1	(0)
2016–2017	→ Oldham Athletic (loan)	17	(2)
2017	→ Shrewsbury Town (loan)	15	(4)
2018	Southend United	10	(0)
2018–2019	Plymouth Argyle	45	(18)
2019–2022	Rotherham United	104	(34)
2022–2024	Ipswich Town	63	(19)
2024	→ Charlton Athletic (loan)	14	(1)
2024–2025	Huddersfield Town	21	(0)
2026	Chesterfield	7	(0)
- * Club domestic league appearances and goals as of 15 October 2026 (UTC)

Olayinka Fredrick Oladotun Ladapo (born 1 February 1993) is an English professional footballer who plays as a forward.

Ladapo began his senior career at Colchester United, having previously been in the academies at both Colchester and Southend United. During his time at Colchester, he had a number of loan spells in non-league football with Thurrock, Chelmsford City, Bishop's Stortford, Woking and Nuneaton Town. He made his Football League debut in December 2012. In 2014 he left Colchester to join Kidderminster Harriers, spending time out on loan at Hayes & Yeading United and Grays Athletic during his time at Kidderminster before moving to Margate in 2015. He won promotion from the Isthmian League Premier Division through the play-offs during his time at the club, earning him a move to Premier League club Crystal Palace in 2016. During his time at Palace, he spent time out on loan at Oldham Athletic and Shrewsbury Town, whilst also making his Premier League debut in 2017. In 2018, Ladapo joined his former academy side Southend United, departing later in the year to join Plymouth Argyle. A year later he signed for Rotherham United for a club record fee, going on to win two promotions from EFL League One during his time at the club, whilst also winning the EFL Trophy in 2022. He left Rotherham in the summer of 2022, signing for Ipswich Town on a free transfer and going onto win promotion from EFL League One in his first season with the club.

== Club career ==
=== Colchester United ===
Ladapo, born in Romford, England, scored close to a goal a game at youth level for Colchester United's Academy. On 1 March 2011, he was loaned to Conference South club Thurrock for work experience, and scored on his senior debut that day as a half-time substitute in a 3–1 home loss to Boreham Wood. On 30 March he was loaned to Chelmsford City of the same division.

He signed a professional one-and-a-half-year contract with Colchester in March 2012, and at the start of the following season, he was loaned to Bishop's Stortford in the Conference North. Ladapo made his first appearance for Colchester in the 2012–13 season, coming on as a 68th-minute substitute for Gavin Massey in a 3–1 home defeat to Brentford on 26 December 2012.

In June 2013, Ladapo signed a new one-year contract to keep him with Colchester for a further season, looking to add to his four first-team appearances he made during the 2012–13 season. He was then loaned out to Conference outfit Woking on 16 August 2013 for one month to bolster Garry Hill's strike-force. Ladapo was brought in to cover the suspended Giuseppe Solet. Featuring in the starting line-up against Chester on 17 August, Ladapo was replaced after 53 minutes by Joe McNerny who went on to score ten minutes later in the 2–0 victory.

Having previously failed to score in his four appearances for Woking, Ladapo was sent out on loan to fellow Conference team Nuneaton Town on 1 November for one month. He made his debut the following day in a 2–2 draw with Hyde, and scored the opening goal. In his next match against Welling United on 16 November, Ladapo was brought on as an 86th-minute substitute and subsequently scored an injury-time goal to win the game 2–1.

=== Kidderminster Harriers ===
On 24 January 2014, Ladapo joined Conference side Kidderminster Harriers on a free transfer from Colchester United. Ladapo was registered in time to face Premier League club Sunderland in the FA Cup fourth round the following day. He made his Harriers debut in the game as a 68th-minute substitute in front of a crowd of 25,081 as Kiddermister went down 1–0, Ladapo missing a late chance to level the game.

On 11 March 2014, Ladapo joined Conference South club Hayes & Yeading United on an initial one-month loan, and four days later he scored the only goal of a home win against Concord Rangers, the West London club's first victory of the calendar year. His loan was extended on 10 April until the end of the season.

On 30 July 2014, Ladapo joined Grays Athletic of the Isthmian League Premier Division on loan until January. Ladapo went on to make 26 appearances in the league, scoring 14 goals.

=== Margate ===
Kidderminster Harriers cancelled Ladapo's contract by mutual consent on 13 January 2015. The following day, he signed for Isthmian League Premier Division promotion chasers Margate. In March 2016 Ladapo went on trial to Crystal Palace, during which he scored a hat trick in an Under-21 match versus Watford.

=== Crystal Palace ===
On 30 March 2016, Lapado joined Palace on a two-and-a-half-year contract for an undisclosed fee. While primarily used as a member of the development squad, in July 2016 he accompanied the first team on their North American tour and was named in the starting lineup for the first friendly match against Philadelphia Union.

On 30 August 2016, Ladapo joined Oldham Athletic on loan until 2 January 2017.

After his loan at Oldham expired, Ladapo joined fellow League One side Shrewsbury Town on a half-season loan deal on 5 January 2017. He made his debut for the club two days later, playing the entirety of a 1−1 draw away at Swindon Town, and scored the only goal of the match on his home debut against Bradford City a week later.

He made his Palace debut in a 4–0 away defeat at Manchester United on 30 September 2017 as a 74th-minute substitute for Bakary Sako.

=== Southend United ===
On 31 January 2018, Ladapo moved to League One side Southend United for an undisclosed fee, having been poised to join AFC Wimbledon earlier the same day and even arriving at the club's stadium to undergo a medical before walking out midway through.

At the end of the 2017–18 season, having not scored in ten appearances, he was released by the club.

=== Plymouth Argyle ===
After being released by Southend, Ladapo signed for fellow league team Plymouth Argyle.

He was Plymouth Argyle's top scorer in the 2018–19 season.

=== Rotherham United ===
On 25 June 2019, Ladapo signed a three-year contract with Rotherham United for £500,000, which represented a record transfer fee for the South Yorkshire club.

In January 2022, Ladapo put in a transfer request at Rotherham, which Rotherham accepted. At the time Ladapo's contract had just six months remaining meaning that, in the summer he would be able to leave on a free transfer. However, a club statement confirmed they have an option to extend his contract by 12 months. Ladapo left the club following their promotion back to the Championship at the end of the 2021–22 season upon the expiration of his contract.

=== Ipswich Town ===
On 30 May 2022, it was announced that Ladapo would be signing for Ipswich Town following the expiration of his contract at Rotherham, signing a three-year deal. He made his debut for Ipswich on the opening day of the 2022–23 season in a 1–1 draw with Bolton Wanderers at Portman Road. After a slow start to the season, he scored his first goal for the club in a 6–0 EFL Trophy win against Northampton Town on 30 August. Ladapo's goal scoring form picked up over the season, reaching double figures in all competitions by the end of December. After Ipswich signed George Hirst on loan in January, Ladapo found more competition for his place in the team, however despite featuring more from the bench in the later stages of the season, his goal scoring form continued, scoring 8 goals after coming off the bench during the league season, the most of any player in EFL League One. He scored 21 goals in all competitions during the season, with 17 goals coming in EFL League One, helping Ipswich win promotion to the EFL Championship in his first season at the club after a second-placed finish. He scored Ipswich's 100th league goal of the season on the final day, opening the scoring in a 2–2 draw against Fleetwood Town. On 30 August 2024, Ladapo was released by the club.

==== Charlton Athletic (loan) ====
On 19 January 2024, Ladapo joined Charlton Athletic on loan until the end of the season.

=== Huddersfield Town ===
On 10 September 2024, it was announced that Ladapo would be signing for Huddersfield Town following the termination of his contract at Ipswich, signing a two-year deal.

On 11 September 2025, Ladapo had his contract with the Terriers terminated by mutual consent.

=== Chesterfield ===
On 1 January 2026, Ladapo joined League Two club Chesterfield on a deal until the end of the season. On 22 May 2026, Chesterfield announced the player was being released.

== International career ==
Ladapo is eligible to represent either England or Nigeria at international level. In June 2011, Ladapo was invited to join a provisional training camp for the Nigeria under-20 team held at Bisham Abbey in preparation for the 2011 FIFA U-20 World Cup. However, he failed to make the final 21-man squad.

== Style of play ==
Ladapo is known for his athleticism and goal scoring ability. Upon signing for Ipswich Town in May 2022, Ipswich manager Kieran McKenna said of Ladapo; "Freddie has a good physical stature, the ability to run beyond the defence, and is good in one-on-one situations."

== Career statistics ==
As of match played 8 March 2025

Appearances and goals by club, season and competition
Club	Season	League			FA Cup		League Cup		Other		Total	
Club	Season	Division	Apps	Goals	Apps	Goals	Apps	Goals	Apps	Goals	Apps	Goals
Colchester United	2010–11	League One	0	0	0	0	0	0	0	0	0	0
Colchester United	2011–12	League One	0	0	0	0	0	0	0	0	0	0
Colchester United	2012–13	League One	4	0	0	0	0	0	0	0	4	0
Colchester United	2013–14	League One	2	0	0	0	0	0	0	0	2	0
Colchester United	Total		6	0	0	0	0	0	0	0	6	0
Thurrock (loan)	2010–11	Conference South	2	1	0	0	—		0	0	2	1
Chelmsford City (loan)	2010–11	Conference South	3	0	0	0	—		0	0	3	0
Bishop's Stortford (loan)	2012–13	Conference North	3	0	0	0	—		0	0	3	0
Woking (loan)	2013–14	Conference Premier	4	0	0	0	—		0	0	4	0
Nuneaton Town (loan)	2013–14	Conference Premier	6	2	0	0	—		2 (Note: Appearances in FA Trophy)	0	8	2
Kidderminster Harriers	2013–14	Conference Premier	3	0	1	0	—		0	0	4	0
Hayes & Yeading (loan)	2013–14	Conference South	16	2	0	0	—		0	0	16	2
Grays Athletic (loan)	2014–15	Isthmian League Premier Division	26	14	3	1	—		6 (Note: Two appearances and one goal in FA Trophy, two appearances and one goal in Isthmian League Cup, two appearances in Essex Senior Cup)	2	35	17
Margate	2014–15	Isthmian League Premier Division	19	13	0	0	—		0	0	19	13
Margate	2015–16	National League South	34	12	1	0	—		0	0	35	12
Margate	Total		53	25	1	0	—		0	0	54	25
Crystal Palace	2015–16	Premier League	0	0	0	0	0	0	—		0	0
Crystal Palace	2016–17	Premier League	0	0	0	0	0	0	—		0	0
Crystal Palace	2017–18	Premier League	1	0	0	0	1	0	—		2	0
Crystal Palace	Total		1	0	0	0	1	0	0	0	2	0
Oldham Athletic (loan)	2016–17	League One	17	2	1	0	0	0	4 (Note: Appearances in EFL Trophy)	1	22	3
Shrewsbury Town (loan)	2016–17	League One	15	4	0	0	0	0	0	0	15	4
Southend United	2017–18	League One	10	0	0	0	0	0	0	0	10	0
Plymouth Argyle	2018–19	League One	45	18	2	0	2	1	0	0	49	19
Rotherham United	2019–20	League One	31	14	3	2	2	1	3	0	39	17
Rotherham United	2020–21	Championship	42	9	0	0	1	0	—		43	9
Rotherham United	2021–22	League One	31	11	2	1	1	0	7	3	41	15
Rotherham United	Total		104	34	5	3	4	1	10	3	123	41
Ipswich Town	2022–23	League One	46	17	4	2	0	0	3	2	53	21
Ipswich Town	2023–24	Championship	17	2	1	0	4	2	—		22	4
Ipswich Town	Total		63	19	5	2	4	2	3	2	75	25
Charlton Athletic (loan)	2023–24	League One	14	1	—		—		—		14	1
Huddersfield Town	2024–25	League One	21	0	1	0	0	0	3	1	25	1
Career total			412	122	19	6	11	4	28	9	470	141

== Honours ==
Margate

- Isthmian League Premier Division play-offs: 2015

Rotherham United

- EFL League One runner-up: 2019–20, 2021–22
- EFL Trophy: 2021–22

Ipswich Town

- EFL League One runner-up: 2022–23
- EFL Championship runner-up: 2023–24

Individual

- EFL League One Player of the Month: October 2018
