= Joe Mattock =

English footballer (born 1990)

Personal information
- Full name: Joseph William Mattock
- Date of birth: 15 May 1990 (age 36)
- Place of birth: Leicester, England
- Height: 1.81 m (5 ft 11 in)
- Position: Left-back

Youth career
- 2004–2007: Leicester City

Senior career*
Years	Team	Apps	(Gls)
2007–2009	Leicester City	66	(1)
2009–2012	West Bromwich Albion	29	(0)
2011	→ Sheffield United (loan)	13	(0)
2011–2012	→ Portsmouth (loan)	7	(0)
2012	→ Brighton & Hove Albion (loan)	15	(1)
2012–2015	Sheffield Wednesday	58	(2)
2015–2022	Rotherham United	207	(4)
2022–2024	Harrogate Town	29	(0)
2023–2024	→ Hartlepool United (loan)	7	(0)
2024–2025	Marine	24	(1)

International career
2006–2007	England U17	1	(0)
2007–2009	England U19	13	(1)
2007–2009	England U21	5	(0)
- * Club domestic league appearances and goals as of 21:42, 22 May 2026 (UTC)

Joseph William Mattock (born 15 May 1990) is an English semi-professional footballer who plays as a left-back, most recently for Marine.

Mattock is a graduate of the Leicester City youth academy, making his senior debut for the club in 2007. He made 73 appearances in total for Leicester before moving to West Bromwich Albion in 2009. Mattock subsequently had spells on loan with Sheffield United, Portsmouth and Brighton & Hove Albion. After leaving West Brom permanently in 2012, he signed for Sheffield Wednesday. Mattock spent three seasons with Sheffield Wednesday before moving to fellow South Yorkshire side Rotherham United. Whilst with Rotherham, Mattock was promoted on three occasions, as well as winning the EFL Trophy. After seven seasons with Rotherham, he signed for Harrogate Town in 2022. He also had a brief loan spell with Hartlepool United. Mattock signed for Marine in August 2024.

Mattock has also represented England youth teams at nearly every level.

== Club career ==
=== Leicester City ===
Mattock was a regular for the Leicester under-18 side (playing alongside the likes of Ashley Chambers, Max Gradel, Andy King and Eric Odhiambo) as well as England U17s. He was part of the U18 squad that won the FA Premier Academy League by beating Sunderland U18s 4–3 on penalties in the 2006–07 season, and was voted Leicester's academy player of the season.

He made his senior debut for Leicester in a 2–1 home defeat to Norwich City on 14 April 2007, replacing Gareth McAuley in the 78th minute at left back. He was given the number 30 shirt worn the year before by another promising youngster, James Wesolowski. Mattock went on to start three games against Birmingham City, Preston North End and Barnsley during the close of the 2006–07 season.

On 9 November 2007, during the 2007–08 season, Mattock signed a new three-year contract with Leicester. The club rejected a bid from an unnamed Premier League club for Mattock on 14 January 2008 (later revealed to be West Ham United). Following Leicester's relegation in the 2007–08 season, Aston Villa became interested in Mattock and then-teammate Richard Stearman. While Stearman left for Wolves in the July transfer window, Mattock remained at the club for another year. He did, however, hand in a transfer request during pre-season, but was unable to secure a deal with any club.

Mattock suffered ligament damage to his left ankle in a 1–0 League Cup win over Stockport County on 12 August 2008. Fortunately, there was no fracture, meaning he would be out for several weeks instead of months. On 28 August, three days before the close of the transfer window, Leicester rejected seven-figure offers from two unnamed clubs for Mattock. He scored his first and only goal for Leicester in a 2–0 win over Yeovil Town on 19 January 2009. Leicester went on to regain promotion to the Championship by finishing the season as league champions.

=== West Bromwich Albion ===
On 6 August, while away on international duty, Mattock was ecstatic when informed by his agent that West Bromwich Albion were interested in him. Eager to leave Leicester, he submitted his transfer request to chairman Milan Mandarić. The manner in which Mattock made the request infuriated manager Nigel Pearson. He signed a three-year contract with West Brom four days later for a fee of £1 million, citing Richard Stearman as his motivation for leaving Leicester. The comment angered many Leicester fans and he was booed upon his return to the Walkers Stadium in November.

Mattock made his debut for Albion in the 2–0 League Cup win over Bury.

In January 2011, he joined Sheffield United on loan until end of the 2010–11 Football League Championship season making his first start for the Blades away at Coventry City a couple of days later. He went on to make 13 appearances for the Yorkshire club but was unable to help prevent them from being relegated at the end of the season. In November of the same year, Mattock joined Championship team Portsmouth on a loan deal lasting until 2 January 2012, alongside George Thorne. He made his debut two days later, starting in the 1–1 draw against Leicester City.

On 31 January 2012, Mattock signed for Championship side Brighton & Hove Albion on a loan deal lasting until the end of the season. On 17 March, he scored in a 3–1 away defeat to Blackpool. In total, Mattock made 15 league appearances for the Seagulls during his loan spell. On 16 May 2012, Mattock was released by West Bromwich Albion after his contract was not renewed.

=== Sheffield Wednesday ===
In June 2012, Mattock was expected to complete a permanent transfer to Brighton following his successful loan spell, but instead agreed a three-year contract at newly promoted Championship side Sheffield Wednesday.

At the end of the 2014–15 season, Mattock was one of eleven players released from their contracts by the club.

=== Rotherham United ===
On 12 June 2015, Mattock signed for Championship club Rotherham United. He made his debut in a 2–1 defeat against Nottingham Forest on 15 August 2015 and scored his first goal for the club in a 2–1 defeat to Brentford on 17 October 2015. On 24 May 2017, Mattock signed a two-year extension to his contract, keeping him at the club until June 2019. Mattock played in the 2018 League One play-off final as the Millers defeated Shrewsbury Town at Wembley Stadium. He started for Rotherham in the 2022 EFL Trophy final at Wembley as they won 4–2 after extra time against Sutton United. Mattock was released by the club at the end of the 2021–22 season following a third promotion from League One with the club.

=== Harrogate Town ===
On 21 June 2022, Mattock signed for League Two Harrogate Town.

On 23 October 2023, Mattock signed for National League club Hartlepool United on a short-term loan. He made his Hartlepool debut the following day in a 2–1 defeat to FC Halifax Town. This loan deal was later extended until 1 January 2024. On 5 January 2024, it was announced that his loan spell with Hartlepool had ended. At the end of the 2023–24 season, he was released by Harrogate having made 33 appearances for the club over two years.

== International career ==
After making his first team debut, Mattock was named in the England squad for the U17 Championships in Belgium. On 3 October 2007, Mattock was called up to the England U19 squad for the 2008 European U19 Championship. On 12 November, Mattock was called up to the England U21 squad alongside former clubmate Richard Stearman for the 2009 European U21 Championship qualifiers, making his debut in a 2–0 win over Bulgaria U21 on 16 November. In doing so he became the second youngest player to represent the England U21, behind Theo Walcott. However, he did not make the final squad for the tournament and instead played at the U19 European Championships. He scored his first ever international goal in the group stage and helped England to the final where they lost out to the hosts, Ukraine.

== Personal life ==
Mattock grew up in the Eyres Monsell area of Leicester. On 2 September 2009, he was charged with assaulting four people in the Churchgate area of Leicester. In July 2011, Mattock pleaded guilty to a charge of affray and on 23 October 2011 he was sentenced to ten months in prison, suspended for two years, and ordered to complete 150 hours of unpaid work and pay £1,500 costs.

== Career statistics ==
As of match played 18 February 2025

Appearances and goals by club, season and competition
Season	Club	League			FA Cup		League Cup		Other		Total	
Season	Club	Division	Apps	Goals	Apps	Goals	Apps	Goals	Apps	Goals	Apps	Goals
Leicester City	2006–07	Championship	4	0	—		—		—		4	0
Leicester City	2007–08	Championship	31	0	0	0	2	0	—		33	0
Leicester City	2008–09	League One	31	1	4	0	1	0	0	0	36	1
Leicester City	Total		66	1	4	0	3	0	0	0	73	1
West Bromwich Albion	2009–10	Championship	29	0	3	1	2	0	0	0	34	1
West Bromwich Albion	2010–11	Premier League	0	0	0	0	0	0	0	0	0	0
West Bromwich Albion	2011–12	Premier League	0	0	0	0	2	0	0	0	2	0
West Bromwich Albion	Total		29	0	3	1	4	0	0	0	36	1
Sheffield United (loan)	2010–11	Championship	13	0	0	0	0	0	0	0	13	0
Portsmouth (loan)	2011–12	Championship	7	0	0	0	0	0	0	0	7	0
Brighton (loan)	2011–12	Championship	15	1	0	0	0	0	0	0	15	1
Sheffield Wednesday	2012–13	Championship	7	0	2	0	1	0	0	0	10	0
Sheffield Wednesday	2013–14	Championship	23	2	3	1	0	0	0	0	26	3
Sheffield Wednesday	2014–15	Championship	27	0	0	0	3	0	0	0	30	0
Sheffield Wednesday	Total		57	2	5	1	4	0	0	0	66	3
Rotherham United	2015–16	Championship	35	1	0	0	1	0	0	0	36	1
Rotherham United	2016–17	Championship	36	0	1	0	0	0	0	0	37	0
Rotherham United	2017–18	League One	35	1	0	0	1	0	4 (Note: 1 appearance in EFL Trophy, 3 appearances in EFL League One play-offs)	0	39	1
Rotherham United	2018–19	Championship	45	1	1	0	0	0	0	0	46	1
Rotherham United	2019–20	League One	24	1	0	0	0	0	1 (Note: Appearance(s) in EFL Trophy)	0	25	1
Rotherham United	2020–21	Championship	14	0	0	0	1	0	0	0	15	0
Rotherham United	2021–22	League One	20	0	1	0	1	0	5	1	27	1
Rotherham United	Total		208	4	3	0	4	0	10	1	225	5
Harrogate Town	2022–23	League Two	24	0	2	0	0	0	0	0	26	0
Harrogate Town	2023–24	League Two	5	0	0	0	1	0	1	1	7	1
Harrogate Town	Total		29	0	2	0	1	0	1	1	33	1
Hartlepool United (loan)	2023–24	National League	7	0	0	0	0	0	1 (Note: Appearance(s) in FA Trophy)	0	8	0
Marine	2024–25	National League North	24	2	1	0	0	0	1 (Note: Appearance(s) in FA Trophy)	0	26	2
Career total			455	10	18	2	16	0	13	2	502	14

== Honours ==
Leicester City

- Football League One: 2008–09

Rotherham United

- EFL League One second-place promotion: 2019–20, 2021–22; play-offs: 2018
- EFL Trophy: 2021–22

England U19

- UEFA European Under-19 Championship runner-up: 2009

Individual

- Leicester City Academy Player of the Year: 2006–07
