= Rarmani Edmonds-Green =

English footballer

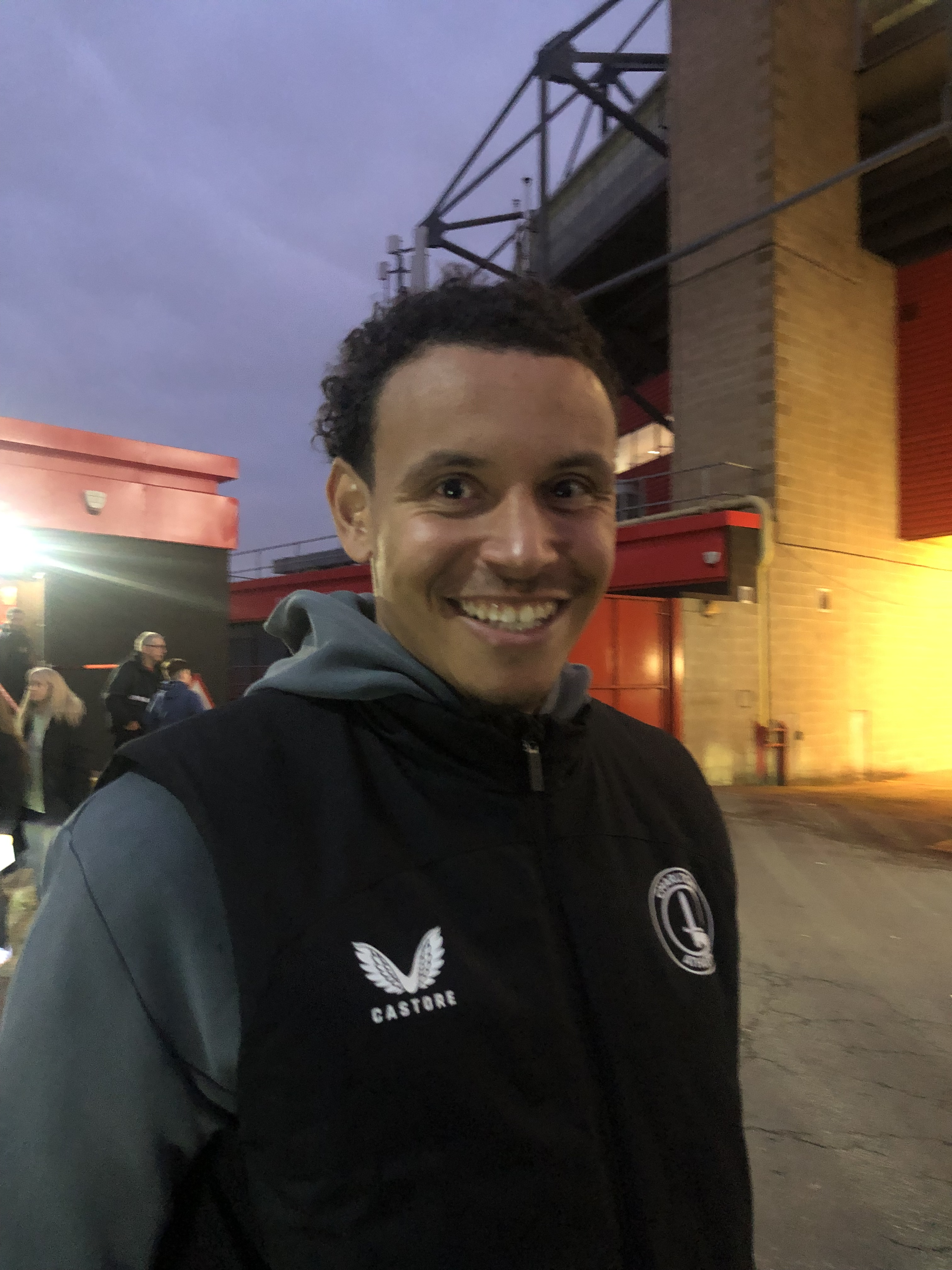
- Edmonds-Green in 2024

Personal information
- Full name: Rarmani River Miguel Joseph Edmonds-Green
- Date of birth: 14 January 1999 (age 27)
- Place of birth: Peckham, England
- Height: 5 ft 11 in (1.81 m)
- Position: Defender

Team information
- Current team: Leyton Orient
- Number: 4

Youth career
- 2010–2011: Crystal Palace
- –2016: Nike Academy
- 2016–2018: Huddersfield Town

Senior career*
Years	Team	Apps	(Gls)
2018–2024	Huddersfield Town	51	(2)
2019	→ Brighouse Town (loan)	13	(0)
2019	→ Bromley (loan)	7	(0)
2020	→ Swindon Town (loan)	9	(1)
2021–2022	→ Rotherham United (loan)	28	(3)
2022–2023	→ Wigan Athletic (loan)	4	(0)
2024–2025	Charlton Athletic	25	(1)
2025–	Leyton Orient	24	(1)
- * Club domestic league appearances and goals as of 17:10, 31 October 2026 (UTC)

Rarmani River Miguel Joseph Edmonds-Green (born 14 January 1999) is an English professional footballer who plays as a defender for EFL League One club Leyton Orient.

== Club career ==
=== Crystal Palace ===
Edmonds-Green was born in Peckham, Greater London. He was scouted by Crystal Palace while playing for Gridlockers, a team based in Eltham. After spending a year with the Crystal Palace Academy at U11 level, he was released and later joined the Nike Academy.

=== Huddersfield Town ===
After going on trial with multiple London clubs including Charlton Athletic, Millwall, Brentford and Leyton Orient, Edmonds-Green signed for Huddersfield Town on his 17th birthday in January 2016. He quickly became captain of the under-18 side in the 2016–17 season, before moving up to the under-23 side in 2017.

His first piece of first team action came for Brighouse Town in the Northern Premier League Division One East, where he helped them win the play-offs, but due to an unusual rule regarding the arrangement of teams in their level of the football pyramid, they were not promoted.

He then was sent on loan by new Huddersfield Town manager Danny Cowley in October 2019, when he joined National League side Bromley, who he played for in 7 games, before being recalled by Huddersfield, where he then made his league debut in a 1–0 win over Charlton Athletic. Edmonds-Green had made his debut in a 1–0 defeat against Lincoln City (then managed by Cowley) in the EFL Cup earlier in the season. Edmonds-Green joined Swindon Town in January 2020 on loan until the end of the 2019–20 season. He scored his first professional goal in a 1–1 draw with Carlisle United on 8 February 2020.

He scored his first goal for Huddersfield in a 2–1 defeat to Barnsley on 26 December 2020.

On 4 August 2021, Edmonds-Green joined EFL League One side Rotherham United on a season long loan. He scored his first goal for the club on 2 October 2021, a 22-yard strike against Cheltenham Town.

On 1 September 2022, he joined EFL Championship side Wigan Athletic on a season-long loan. However, his loan was terminated on 11 January 2023.

=== Charlton Athletic ===
On 19 January 2024, Edmonds-Green joined Charlton Athletic on a two-and-a-half-year deal.

=== Leyton Orient ===
On 3 February 2025, Edmonds-Green joined Leyton Orient on a two-and-a-half-year contract.

== Career statistics ==
As of match played 11 October 2025

Appearances and goals by club, season and competition
Club	Season	League			FA Cup		EFL Cup		Other		Total	
Club	Season	Division	Apps	Goals	Apps	Goals	Apps	Goals	Apps	Goals	Apps	Goals
Huddersfield Town	2018–19	Premier League	0	0	0	0	0	0	0	0	0	0
Huddersfield Town	2019–20	Championship	2	0	—		1	0	0	0	3	0
Huddersfield Town	2020–21	Championship	24	2	0	0	0	0	0	0	24	2
Huddersfield Town	2021–22	Championship	0	0	0	0	0	0	0	0	0	0
Huddersfield Town	2022–23	Championship	11	0	0	0	1	0	0	0	12	0
Huddersfield Town	2023–24	Championship	14	0	1	0	1	0	0	0	16	0
Huddersfield Town	Total		51	2	1	0	3	0	0	0	55	3
Brighouse Town (loan)	2018–19	NPL 1 East	13	0	—		—		—		13	0
Bromley (loan)	2019–20	National League	7	0	2	0	—		—		9	0
Swindon Town (loan)	2019–20	League Two	9	1	—		—		—		9	1
Rotherham United (loan)	2021–22	League One	28	3	3	0	1	0	6 (Note: Appearance(s) in EFL Trophy)	0	38	3
Wigan Athletic (loan)	2021–23	Championship	4	0	1	0	—		—		5	0
Charlton Athletic	2023–24	League One	14	0	—		—		—		14	0
Charlton Athletic	2024–25	League One	11	1	1	0	1	0	4 (Note: Appearance(s) in EFL Trophy)	0	17	1
Charlton Athletic	Total		25	1	1	0	1	0	4	0	31	1
Leyton Orient	2024–25	League One	17	0	—		—		3 (Note: Appearance(s) in EFL League One play-offs)	0	20	0
Leyton Orient	2025–26	League One	6	0	0	0	1	0	2 (Note: Appearance(s) in EFL Trophy)	0	9	0
Leyton Orient	2026–27	League One	0	0	0	0	0	0	0	0	0	0
Leyton Orient	Total		23	0	0	0	1	0	5	0	29	0
Total			160	7	8	0	6	0	15	0	189	7

== Honours ==
Swindon Town

- EFL League Two: 2019–20

Rotherham United

- EFL League One runner-up: 2021–22
- EFL Trophy: 2021–22
