= 2020–21 Rotherham United F.C. season =

Rotherham United
2020–21 season
- Chairman: Tony Stewart
- Manager: Paul Warne
- Stadium: New York Stadium
- Championship: 23rd (relegated)
- FA Cup: Third round
- EFL Cup: First round
- Top goalscorer: League: Michael Smith, 10 goals All: Michael Smith, 10 goals
| Home colours | Away colours | Third colours |

The 2020–21 season is Rotherham United's 96th season in their existence and the first back in the Championship following promotion last season. The club also participated in the FA Cup and the EFL Cup.

== Key events ==
The delayed season started for Rotherham on 5 September 2021, with a defeat on penalties in the EFL cup to League 2 side Salford City.

On 15 September, manager Paul Warne and his assistant Richie Barker signed new contracts, keeping them at the club until the summer of 2023.

Rotherham suffered long-term injuries to four key players in the five weeks between 7 October and 12 November. Chiedozie Ogbene required knee surgery, and was ruled out until at least January; Clark Robertson suffered a broken foot, which ruled him out until the end of the winter; Shaun MacDonald broke his leg in the game against Stoke City on 31 October, and was out until the new year; and Kieran Sadlier suffered an ankle injury in the game against Preston the following Saturday, keeping him side-lined for three months.

In the run-up to Christmas, the club were hit by an outbreak of COVID-19, causing the postponements of the planned games against Derby County and Middlesbrough. They returned to competition on 29 December against Barnsley, under perceived threat of a points deduction if they did not complete the fixture, despite having an "obliterated" squad, and only being able to name six substitutes.

The first scheduled game of 2021, at home against Cardiff City, was called off an hour before kick-off due to snow, adding to the fixture congestion the club would face later in the season. A week later, Rotherham exited the FA Cup at the first attempt, after a close game with Everton went to extra time, due to FA Cup ties needing to be resolved in a single match this season.

A waterlogged pitch on 2 February caused the game against Derby County, postponed from December, to be postponed again. This time it was able to take place the following day. Nine days later, a frozen pitch led to the postponement of the fixture against QPR.

On 3 March 2021, the club beat Sheffield Wednesday 2–1 at Hillsborough Stadium, despite having Michael Smith sent off (a decision which was later overturned), claiming a first-ever league double over their South Yorkshire rivals.

On 5 March 2021, Rotherham announced a second COVID-19 outbreak at the club, causing the postponement of games against Brentford and Luton Town, the latter of which had already been moved once due to Luton's appearance in the FA Cup fourth round. On 9 March, further positive COVID-19 tests were announced, and the game against Coventry City was postponed. At this stage, with the Luton and Coventry games yet to be rescheduled, the club had only one free midweek slot left in the calendar.

By 8 April 2021, the club faced a run-in which entailed playing ten games in 28 days, including four in nine days between 10 April and 18 April.

A 1–0 defeat to Brentford in the rearranged game on 27 April 2021 saw Rotherham set an EFL record of 19 single-goal defeats in a season.

Going into the final game of the season, Rotherham sat two points from safety, needing to win and hope Derby County did not. They led at Cardiff City from the eighth minute of the game, but conceded an equaliser two minutes from the end of normal time.

== Squad statistics ==
=== Player statistics ===
As of 8 May 2021.

Players with zero appearances have been unused substitutes in one or more games.

| No. | Pos. | Nat. | Name | Total | | League | | FA Cup | | EFL Cup | | EFL Trophy | | Discipline | |
| No. | Pos. | Nat. | Name | Apps | Goals | Apps | Goals | Apps | Goals | Apps | Goals | Apps | Goals | Yellow card | Red card |
|---|---|---|---|---|---|---|---|---|---|---|---|---|---|---|---|
| 1 | GK | (Sweden) | Viktor Johansson | 21 | 0 | 21 | 0 | 0 | 0 | 0 | 0 | 0 | 0 | 0 | 0 |
| 27 | GK | (England) | Jamal Blackman | 27+1 | 0 | 25+1 | 0 | 1 | 0 | 1 | 0 | 0 | 0 | 2 | 0 |
| 31 | GK | (England) | Josh Vickers | 0 | 0 | 0 | 0 | 0 | 0 | 0 | 0 | 0 | 0 | 0 | 0 |
| 2 | DF | (England) | Billy Jones | 3+4 | 0 | 3+2 | 0 | 0+1 | 0 | 0+1 | 0 | 0 | 0 | 2 | 0 |
| 3 | DF | (England) | Joe Mattock | 13+2 | 0 | 12+2 | 0 | 0 | 0 | 1 | 0 | 0 | 0 | 2 | 0 |
| 6 | DF | (England) | Richard Wood | 29+3 | 2 | 27+3 | 2 | 1 | 0 | 1 | 0 | 0 | 0 | 8 | 1 |
| 15 | DF | (Scotland) | Clark Robertson | 11+5 | 0 | 11+5 | 0 | 0 | 0 | 0 | 0 | 0 | 0 | 0 | 0 |
| 18 | DF | (Republic of Ireland) | Trevor Clarke | 1+9 | 0 | 1+8 | 0 | 0+1 | 0 | 0 | 0 | 0 | 0 | 0 | 0 |
| 19 | DF | (England) | Wes Harding | 43+5 | 0 | 41+5 | 0 | 1 | 0 | 1 | 0 | 0 | 0 | 3 | 0 |
| 20 | DF | (England) | Michael Ihiekwe | 44 | 2 | 42 | 2 | 1 | 0 | 1 | 0 | 0 | 0 | 12 | 0 |
| 21 | DF | (England) | Angus MacDonald | 37+3 | 1 | 36+3 | 1 | 1 | 0 | 0 | 0 | 0 | 0 | 9 | 1 |
| 22 | DF | (United States) | Matthew Olosunde | 23+10 | 1 | 22+10 | 0 | 1 | 1 | 0 | 0 | 0 | 0 | 4 | 0 |
| 23 | DF | (Jamaica) | Curtis Tilt | 0 | 0 | 0 | 0 | 0 | 0 | 0 | 0 | 0 | 0 | 0 | 0 |
| 30 | DF | (England) | Ryan Giles | 12+11 | 2 | 12+11 | 2 | 0 | 0 | 0 | 0 | 0 | 0 | 0 | 0 |
| 35 | DF | (England) | Jake Hull | 0 | 0 | 0 | 0 | 0 | 0 | 0 | 0 | 0 | 0 | 0 | 0 |
| 4 | MF | (Wales) | Shaun MacDonald | 16+4 | 0 | 15+4 | 0 | 0 | 0 | 1 | 0 | 0 | 0 | 2 | 0 |
| 5 | MF | (England) | Lewis Wing | 18+2 | 2 | 18+2 | 2 | 0 | 0 | 0 | 0 | 0 | 0 | 1 | 0 |
| 8 | MF | (England) | Ben Wiles | 37+8 | 2 | 36+8 | 2 | 1 | 0 | 0 | 0 | 0 | 0 | 7 | 0 |
| 11 | MF | (Republic of Ireland) | Chiedozie Ogbene | 7+5 | 0 | 6+5 | 0 | 0 | 0 | 1 | 0 | 0 | 0 | 0 | 0 |
| 14 | MF | (England) | Mickel Miller | 6+3 | 0 | 6+3 | 0 | 0 | 0 | 0 | 0 | 0 | 0 | 3 | 1 |
| 16 | MF | (Scotland) | Jamie Lindsay | 30+7 | 3 | 28+7 | 3 | 1 | 0 | 1 | 0 | 0 | 0 | 6 | 0 |
| 17 | MF | (Republic of Ireland) | Kieran Sadlier | 6+10 | 1 | 5+10 | 1 | 0 | 0 | 1 | 0 | 0 | 0 | 0 | 0 |
| 25 | MF | (England) | Matt Crooks | 35+7 | 7 | 34+6 | 6 | 1 | 0 | 0+1 | 1 | 0 | 0 | 7 | 1 |
| 26 | MF | (England) | Daniel Barlaser | 30+4 | 3 | 29+4 | 3 | 1 | 0 | 0 | 0 | 0 | 0 | 3 | 0 |
| 28 | MF | (Suriname) | Florian Jozefzoon | 9+16 | 0 | 9+15 | 0 | 0+1 | 0 | 0 | 0 | 0 | 0 | 0 | 0 |
| 7 | FW | (Northern Ireland) | Kyle Vassell | 6+8 | 0 | 6+6 | 0 | 0+1 | 0 | 0+1 | 0 | 0 | 0 | 0 | 0 |
| 9 | FW | (England) | George Hirst | 4+28 | 0 | 4+27 | 0 | 0+1 | 0 | 0 | 0 | 0 | 0 | 3 | 0 |
| 10 | FW | (England) | Freddie Ladapo | 24+19 | 9 | 23+19 | 9 | 0 | 0 | 1 | 0 | 0 | 0 | 0 | 0 |
| 24 | FW | (England) | Michael Smith | 36+10 | 10 | 34+10 | 10 | 1 | 0 | 1 | 0 | 0 | 0 | 8 | 0 |
| 34 | FW | (England) | Jacob Gratton | 0 | 0 | 0 | 0 | 0 | 0 | 0 | 0 | 0 | 0 | 0 | 0 |
Players played for the club this season on loan who returned to their parent club during the season:
Players played for the club this season who were permanently transferred out before the end of the season:
| 5 | DF | (Northern Ireland) | Adam Thompson | 0 | 0 | 0 | 0 | 0 | 0 | 0 | 0 | 0 | 0 | 0 | 0 |

=== Goalscorers ===
As of 8 May 2021.

| Place | Position | Nation | Number | Name | Total | League | FA Cup | EFL Cup | Other |
|---|---|---|---|---|---|---|---|---|---|
| 1 | FW | (England) | 24 | Michael Smith | 10 | 10 | 0 | 0 | 0 |
| 2 | FW | (England) | 10 | Freddie Ladapo | 9 | 9 | 0 | 0 | 0 |
| 3 | MF | (England) | 25 | Matt Crooks | 7 | 6 | 0 | 1 | 0 |
| 4 | MF | (Scotland) | 16 | Jamie Lindsay | 3 | 3 | 0 | 0 | 0 |
| = | MF | (England) | 26 | Daniel Barlaser | 3 | 3 | 0 | 0 | 0 |
| 6 | MF | (England) | 5 | Lewis Wing | 2 | 2 | 0 | 0 | 0 |
| = | DF | (England) | 6 | Richard Wood | 2 | 2 | 0 | 0 | 0 |
| = | MF | (England) | 8 | Ben Wiles | 2 | 2 | 0 | 0 | 0 |
| = | DF | (England) | 20 | Michael Ihiekwe | 2 | 2 | 0 | 0 | 0 |
| = | DF | (England) | 30 | Ryan Giles | 2 | 2 | 0 | 0 | 0 |
| 11 | MF | (Republic of Ireland) | 17 | Kieran Sadlier | 1 | 1 | 0 | 0 | 0 |
| = | DF | (England) | 21 | Angus MacDonald | 1 | 1 | 0 | 0 | 0 |
| = | DF | (United States) | 22 | Matthew Olosunde | 1 | 0 | 1 | 0 | 0 |

== Pre-season friendlies ==
Due to the COVID-19 situation meaning fans could not attend games at the time, a full pre-season schedule was not published by the club. The club were involved in a friendly game on 18 August 2020 against Gainsborough Trinity, which ended with a 6–0 victory. The club also played unadvertised games against Hull City and Doncaster Rovers.

| 22 August 2020 Friendly | Mansfield Town | 0–3 | Rotherham United | Mansfield |
| 13:00 BST | | Report | Mattock 53'; Smith 63'; Miller 89' | Stadium: One Call Stadium; Attendance: 0 |

== Competitions ==
=== Championship ===
==== League table ====
| Pos | Team | Pld | W | D | L | GF | GA | GD | Pts | Promotion, qualification or relegation |
|---|---|---|---|---|---|---|---|---|---|---|
| 19 | Bristol City | 46 | 15 | 6 | 25 | 46 | 68 | −22 | 51 | |
| 20 | Huddersfield Town | 46 | 12 | 13 | 21 | 50 | 71 | −21 | 49 | |
| 21 | Derby County | 46 | 11 | 11 | 24 | 36 | 58 | −22 | 44 | |
| 22 | Wycombe Wanderers (R) | 46 | 11 | 10 | 25 | 39 | 69 | −30 | 43 | Relegation to EFL League One |
| 23 | Rotherham United (R) | 46 | 11 | 9 | 26 | 44 | 60 | −16 | 42 | Relegation to EFL League One |
| 24 | Sheffield Wednesday (R) | 46 | 12 | 11 | 23 | 40 | 61 | −21 | 41 (Note: Sheffield Wednesday received a 12 point deduction for breaching the League's Profitability and Sustainability Rules. This was later reduced to 6 points by an Independent League Arbitration panel.) | Relegation to EFL League One |

Source: EFL Official Website
Rules for classification: 1) Points; 2) Goal difference; 3) Number of goals scored; 4) Head-to-head results; 5) Wins; 6) Away goals; 7) Penalty points (sec 9.5); 8) 12-point sending off offences
(R) Relegated

==== Results summary ====
| Overall | | | | | | | | Home | | | | | | Away | | | | | |
| Pld | W | D | L | GF | GA | GD | Pts | W | D | L | GF | GA | GD | W | D | L | GF | GA | GD |
|---|---|---|---|---|---|---|---|---|---|---|---|---|---|---|---|---|---|---|---|
| 46 | 11 | 9 | 26 | 44 | 60 | −16 | 42 | 5 | 4 | 14 | 26 | 35 | −9 | 6 | 5 | 12 | 18 | 25 | −7 |

Last updated: 8 May 2021.
Source: BBC

==== Results by matchday ====
| Matchday | 1 | 2 | 3 | 4 | 5 | 6 | 7 | 8 | 9 | 10 | 11 | 12 | 13 | 14 | 15 | 16 | 17 | 18 | 19 | 20 | 21 | 22 | 23 | 24 | 25 | 26 | 27 | 28 | 29 | 30 | 31 | 32 | 33 | 34 | 35 | 36 | 37 | 38 | 39 | 40 | 41 | 42 | 43 | 44 | 45 | 46 |
|---|---|---|---|---|---|---|---|---|---|---|---|---|---|---|---|---|---|---|---|---|---|---|---|---|---|---|---|---|---|---|---|---|---|---|---|---|---|---|---|---|---|---|---|---|---|---|
| Ground | A | H | A | H | H | A | A | H | A | H | H | A | A | H | H | A | A | H | A | H | A | H | A | H | H | A | H | A | A | H | H | A | H | A | A | H | A | H | H | H | H | A | A | H | A | A |
| Result | W | L | D | D | L | D | L | W | L | L | W | L | L | D | L | L | L | W | L | L | W | D | W | L | W | W | L | L | L | L | L | W | L | W | L | L | D | W | L | L | L | L | L | D | D | D |
| Position | 7 | 15 | 14 | 12 | 16 | 17 | 18 | 17 | 19 | 19 | 19 | 19 | 19 | 19 | 20 | 20 | 20 | 20 | 20 | 23 | 22 | 22 | 22 | 22 | 22 | 20 | 20 | 21 | 22 | 22 | 22 | 22 | 22 | 22 | 22 | 22 | 22 | 22 | 22 | 22 | 22 | 22 | 22 | 22 | 22 | 23 |

Updated to match(es) played on 8 May 2021. Source: Statto.com
A = Away; H = Home; W = Win; D = Draw; L = Loss

==== Matches ====
The 2020–21 season fixtures were released on 21 August.

| 12 September 2020 1 | Wycombe Wanderers | 0–1 | Rotherham United | High Wycombe |
| 12:30 BST | Bloomfield (yellow card) 22' | Report | Harding (yellow card) 72'; Ihiekwe 90+2' | Stadium: Adams Park; Attendance: 0 Referee: James Linington |

| 19 September 2020 2 | Rotherham United | 0–1 | Millwall | Rotherham |
| 15:00 BST | Ihiekwe (yellow card) 25' | Report | J. Wallace 50'; Malone (yellow card) 64'; M. Wallace (yellow card) 76' | Stadium: New York Stadium; Attendance: 0 Referee: Leigh Doughty |

| 26 September 2020 3 | Birmingham City | 1–1 | Rotherham United | Bordesley |
| 15:00 BST | Šunjić (yellow card) 72'; Bela 90' (pen.) | Report | MacDonald (yellow card) 45+1'; Sadlier 87' (pen.) | Stadium: St Andrew's; Attendance: 0 Referee: Andrew Madley |

| 3 October 2020 4 | Rotherham United | 1–1 | Huddersfield Town | Rotherham |
| 15:00 BST | Wiles 33'; Mattock (yellow card) 80' | Report | Stearman (yellow card) 83'; MacDonald 90+5' (o.g.) | Stadium: AESSEAL New York Stadium; Attendance: 0 Referee: Andy Woolmer |

| 17 October 2020 5 | Rotherham United | 1–2 | Norwich City | Rotherham |
| 15:00 BST | Ladapo 3' (penalty missed) 21'; A. MacDonald (red card) 70'; Crooks (yellow card) 90+6' | Report | Hanley (yellow card) 56'; Ihiekwe 68' (o.g.); Hugill 90+5' (pen.) | Stadium: AESSEAL New York Stadium; Attendance: 0 Referee: David Webb |

| 20 October 2020 6 | Nottingham Forest | 1–1 | Rotherham United | West Bridgford |
| 19:45 BST | Ameobi 79' | Report | Barlaser 51' (pen.); Lindsay (yellow card) 54'; Harding (yellow card) 90+1' | Stadium: The City Ground; Attendance: 0 Referee: Steve Martin |

| 24 October 2020 7 | Reading | 3–0 | Rotherham United | Reading |
| 15:00 BST | Méïté 41', 79'; João 90+2' (pen.) | Report | Wood (yellow card) 90'; Ihiekwe (yellow card) 90+2' | Stadium: Madejski Stadium; Attendance: 0 Referee: Matt Donohue |

| 28 October 2020 8 | Rotherham United | 3–0 | Sheffield Wednesday | Rotherham |
| 19:45 GMT | Lindsay 5', 45'; Blackman (yellow card) 26'; Barlaser 40' (pen.); Miller (yellow card) 71'; Hirst (yellow card) 75' | Report | Palmer (yellow card) 19'; Lees (red card) 39'; Odubajo (yellow card) 73' | Stadium: New York Stadium; Attendance: 0 Referee: Jarred Gillett |

| 31 October 2020 9 | Stoke City | 1–0 | Rotherham United | Stoke-on-Trent |
| 15:00 GMT | McClean 27'; Fox (yellow card) 90+3' | Report | MacDonald (yellow card) 41'; Smith (yellow card) 71' | Stadium: Bet365 Stadium; Attendance: 0 Referee: Darren Bond |

| 4 November 2020 10 | Rotherham United | 0–1 | Luton Town | Rotherham |
| 19:45 GMT | Miller (yellow card) 77' | Report | Collins 70'; Berry (yellow card) 90+1' | Stadium: New York Stadium; Attendance: 0 Referee: Andrew Madley |

| 7 November 2020 11 | Rotherham United | 2–1 | Preston North End | Rotherham |
| 15:00 GMT | Wood 53'; Ihiekwe (yellow card) 84'; Crooks 86' | Report | Johnson (yellow card) 42'; Ledson 80'; Rafferty (yellow card) 87' | Stadium: New York Stadium; Attendance: 0 Referee: Andy Davies |

| 21 November 2020 12 | Swansea City | 1–0 | Rotherham United | Swansea |
| 15:00 GMT | Grimes 28'; Bennett (yellow card) 32' | Report | Barlaser (yellow card) 45+1' | Stadium: Liberty Stadium; Attendance: 0 Referee: Matt Donohue |

| 24 November 2020 13 | Queens Park Rangers | 3–2 | Rotherham United | Shepherd's Bush |
| 19:00 GMT | Chair 20'; Osayi-Samuel 45+1'; Dykes 45+4' (pen.) | Report | Smith 38'; Wiles (yellow card) 45+3'; Ihiekwe (yellow card) 80'; Ladapo 84'; Crooks (yellow card) 90+1' | Stadium: Kiyan Prince Foundation Stadium; Attendance: 0 Referee: Oliver Langford |

| 28 November 2020 14 | Rotherham United | 2–2 | Bournemouth | Rotherham |
| 15:00 GMT | Ladapo 37', 50'; Ihiekwe (yellow card) 45'; Smith (yellow card) 52' | Report | Stanislas 20' (pen.); Kelly (yellow card) 43'; Solanke 63'; Lerma (yellow card) 76'; Brooks (yellow card) 84' | Stadium: New York Stadium; Attendance: 0 Referee: Geoff Eltringham |

| 1 December 2020 15 | Rotherham United | 0–2 | Brentford | Rotherham |
| 20:00 GMT | Crooks (yellow card) 22'; Wood (yellow card) 48'; Miller (yellow card) 72' (yellow-red card) 82'; MacDonald (yellow card) 73' | Report | Forss 57'; Toney 82' (pen.) | Stadium: New York Stadium; Attendance: 0 Referee: Tim Robinson |

| 5 December 2020 16 | Coventry City | 3–1 | Rotherham United | Bordesley |
| 15:00 GMT | Biamou 5'; Walker 12'; Østigård 72' | Report | Mattock (yellow card) 16'; Olosunde (yellow card) 52'; MacDonald (yellow card) 71'; Barlaser 85' (pen.) | Stadium: St Andrew's; Attendance: 0 Referee: David Webb |

| 8 December 2020 17 | Watford | 2–0 | Rotherham United | Watford |
| 19:45 GMT | Kabasele 4'; Deeney 15' | Report | Jones (yellow card) 67'; Ihiekwe (yellow card) 71' | Stadium: Vicarage Road; Attendance: 1,976; Referee: Josh Smith |

| 12 December 2020 18 | Rotherham United | 2–0 | Bristol City | Rotherham |
| 15:00 GMT | Crooks 4'; Lindsay (yellow card) 19'; Smith 41'; Olosunde (yellow card) 45+2' | Report | Rowe (yellow card) 9' | Stadium: New York Stadium; Attendance: 0 Referee: Leigh Doughty |

| 16 December 2020 19 | Blackburn Rovers | 2–1 | Rotherham United | Blackburn |
| 19:45 GMT | Douglas (yellow card) 58'; Elliott 80'; Nyambe (yellow card) 90+1'; Armstrong 90+8' | Report | Ihiekwe (yellow card) 38'; Smith 61'; Lindsay (yellow card) 64'; Jones (yellow card) 90+5' | Stadium: Ewood Park; Attendance: 0 Referee: Jarred Gillett |

| 29 December 2020 20 | Rotherham United | 1–2 | Barnsley | Rotherham |
| 19:45 GMT | Smith 57' (yellow card) 81'; Lindsay (yellow card) 69'; Wood (yellow card) 77' | Report | Woodrow 8'; Mowatt 15'; Sollbauer (yellow card) 56' | Stadium: New York Stadium; Attendance: 0 Referee: Steve Martin |

| 16 January 2021 21 | Derby County | 0–1 | Rotherham United | Derby |
| 15:00 GMT | Buchanan (yellow card) 28'; Bielik (yellow card) 38' | Report | Wiles (yellow card) 40'; Lindsay 86' | Stadium: Pride Park Stadium; Attendance: 0 Referee: James Linington |

| 19 January 2021 22 | Rotherham United | 3–3 | Stoke City | Rotherham |
| 19:45 GMT | Crooks 31', 67', (yellow card) 81'; Smith 51'; Olosunde (yellow card) 90+1' | Report | A. MacDonald 14' (o.g.); Batth 62'; Powell 75' | Stadium: AESSEAL New York Stadium; Attendance: 0 Referee: Matt Donohue |

| 27 January 2021 23 | Middlesbrough | 0–3 | Rotherham United | Middlesbrough |
| 19:00 GMT | | Report | Crooks 43'; Smith 79' (pen.); Giles 90+2' | Stadium: Riverside Stadium; Attendance: 0 Referee: Michael Salisbury |

| 30 January 2021 24 | Rotherham United | 1–3 | Swansea City | Rotherham |
| 15:00 GMT | Wood (yellow card) 35'; Ladapo 65' | Report | Ayew (yellow card) 9'; Hourihane 28'; Grimes 38'; Fulton 74' | Stadium: New York Stadium; Attendance: 0 Referee: Tony Harrington |

| 3 February 2021 25 | Rotherham United | 3–0 | Derby County | Rotherham |
| 19:00 GMT | Wiles (yellow card) 57'; Ihiekwe 76'; Smith 81'; Crooks (yellow card) 83'; Giles 88' | Report | Shinnie (yellow card) 59'; Bird (yellow card) 65'; Sibley (yellow card) 90+5' | Stadium: New York Stadium; Attendance: 0 Referee: Jeremy Simpson |

| 6 February 2021 26 | Preston North End | 1–2 | Rotherham United | Preston |
| 15:00 GMT | Evans (yellow card) 37', (goal) 65' | Report | Rafferty 1' (o.g.); Barlaser (yellow card) 26'; Wiles 55'; Ihiekwe (yellow card) 72'; Crooks (yellow card) 90+3' | Stadium: Deepdale; Attendance: 0 Referee: Gavin Ward |

| 9 February 2021 27 | Rotherham United | 1–2 | Cardiff City | Rotherham |
| 19:00 GMT | Crooks 55' | Report | Ojo 42'; Bennett 85' | Stadium: New York Stadium; Attendance: 0 Referee: Geoff Eltringham |

| 17 February 2021 28 | Bournemouth | 1–0 | Rotherham United | King's Park |
| 19:45 GMT | Billing 23' | Report | Wiles (yellow card) 63'; Harding (yellow card) 73'; Smith (yellow card) 77' | Stadium: Vitality Stadium; Attendance: 0 Referee: Keith Stroud |

| 20 February 2021 29 | Norwich City | 1–0 | Rotherham United | Norwich |
| 15:00 GMT | Pukki 17' | Report | Ihiekwe (yellow card) 59' | Stadium: Carrow Road; Attendance: 0 Referee: Tony Harrington |

| 23 February 2021 30 | Rotherham United | 0–1 | Nottingham Forest | Rotherham |
| 19:45 GMT | Ihiekwe (yellow card) 26'; Smith (yellow card) 42'; MacDonald (yellow card) 79' | Report | Yates 67'; Figueiredo (yellow card) 79' | Stadium: New York Stadium; Attendance: 0 Referee: Matt Donohue |

| 27 February 2021 31 | Rotherham United | 0–1 | Reading | Rotherham |
| 15:00 GMT | MacDonald (yellow card) 64'; Wiles (yellow card) 85'; Olosunde (yellow card) 90' | Report | Morrison 26' | Stadium: New York Stadium; Attendance: 0 Referee: David Coote |

| 3 March 2021 32 | Sheffield Wednesday | 1–2 | Rotherham United | Owlerton |
| 19:45 GMT | Olosunde 82' (o.g.); Harris (yellow card) 90+5' | Report | Smith 17', (red card) 66'; Ladapo 90+7' | Stadium: Hillsborough; Attendance: 0 Referee: Darren Bond |

| 16 March 2021 33 | Rotherham United | 1–4 | Watford | Rotherham |
| 19:00 GMT | Smith (penalty missed) 61'; Ladapo 68' | Report | Sierralta 9'; Sarr 26'; Sema 39'; Gosling 69' | Stadium: New York Stadium; Attendance: 0 Referee: Jeremy Simpson |

| 20 March 2021 34 | Bristol City | 0–2 | Rotherham United | Bristol |
| 15:00 GMT | Walsh (yellow card) 85' | Report | Smith 44'; Wood 74'; Hirst (yellow card) 90+3' | Stadium: Ashton Gate; Attendance: 0 Referee: Matt Donohue |

| 2 April 2021 35 | Millwall | 1–0 | Rotherham United | Bermondsey |
| 15:00 BST | Wallace 64'; Cooper (yellow card) 75' | Report | Wood (red card) 56'; Smith (penalty missed) 85'; MacDonald (yellow card) 90+2' | Stadium: The Den; Attendance: 0 Referee: John Brooks |

| 5 April 2021 36 | Rotherham United | 0–3 | Wycombe Wanderers | Rotherham |
| 15:00 BST | Crooks (yellow card) 49' | Report | Muskwe 2'; McCarthy 24'; Wheeler (yellow card) 52', (goal) 83'; Ikpeazu (yellow card) 68' | Stadium: New York Stadium; Attendance: 0 Referee: James Linington |

| 10 April 2021 37 | Huddersfield Town | 0–0 | Rotherham United | Huddersfield |
| 15:00 BST | | Report | | Stadium: The John Smith's Stadium; Attendance: 0 Referee: Lee Mason |

| 13 April 2021 38 | Rotherham United | 3–1 | Queens Park Rangers | Rotherham |
| 19:00 BST | S. MacDonald (yellow card) 38'; A. MacDonald (yellow card) 41'; Ladapo 64', 66'; Smith (yellow card) 70', (goal) 90'; Wood (yellow card) 75' | Report | Dykes 52' | Stadium: New York Stadium; Attendance: 0 Referee: Dean Whitestone |

| 15 April 2021 39 | Rotherham United | 0–1 | Coventry City | Rotherham |
| 19:00 BST | Wing (yellow card) 46'; Wiles (yellow card) 56'; Wood (yellow card) 90+3' | Report | Østigård 70'; Biamou (yellow card) 86' | Stadium: New York Stadium; Attendance: 0 Referee: Jarred Gillett |

| 18 April 2021 40 | Rotherham United | 0–1 | Birmingham City | Rotherham |
| 12:00 BST | Ihiekwe (yellow card) 57'; Wood (yellow card) 67' | Report | Dean 88' | Stadium: New York Stadium; Attendance: 0 Referee: Tim Robinson |

| 21 April 2021 41 | Rotherham United | 1–2 | Middlesbrough | Rotherham |
| 18:00 BST | MacDonald 3'; Crooks (red card) 18'; Lindsay (yellow card) 64'; Smith (yellow card) 76' | Report | Saville 33', (yellow card) 72'; Akpom 55'; McNair (yellow card) 90'; Kebano (yellow card) 90+1' | Stadium: New York Stadium; Attendance: 0 Referee: Darren Bond |

| 24 April 2021 42 | Barnsley | 1–0 | Rotherham United | Barnsley |
| 15:00 BST | Morris 2'; Sibbick (yellow card) 65'; Halme (yellow card) 85' | Report | S. MacDonald (yellow card) 28'; Wood (yellow card) 45+1'; A. MacDonald (yellow card) 54' | Stadium: Oakwell Stadium; Attendance: 0 Referee: Gavin Ward |

| 1 May 2021 44 | Rotherham United | 1–1 | Blackburn Rovers | Rotherham |
| 15:00 BST | Smith (yellow card) 21'; Lindsay (yellow card) 69'; Barlaser (yellow card) 78'; Wing 86' | Report | Armstrong 17' | Stadium: New York Stadium; Attendance: 0 Referee: Tony Harrington |

| 4 May 2021 45 | Luton Town | 0–0 | Rotherham United | Luton |
| 19:45 BST | | Report | Smith (yellow card) 43' | Stadium: Kenilworth Road; Attendance: 0 Referee: Dean Whitestone |

| 8 May 2021 46 | Cardiff City | 1–1 | Rotherham United | Cardiff |
| 12:30 BST | Ralls (yellow card) 52'; Pack 88' | Report | Wing 8'; Ihiekwe (yellow card) 39'; Wiles (yellow card) 70' | Stadium: Cardiff City Stadium; Attendance: 0 Referee: Graham Scott |

=== FA Cup ===
The third round draw was made on 30 November, with Premier League and EFL Championship clubs all entering the competition.

| 9 January 2021 Third round | Everton | 2–1 (a.e.t.) | Rotherham United | Liverpool |
| 12:00 GMT | Tosun 9'; Doucouré 93' | Report | Olosunde 56'; Hirst (yellow card) 106' | Stadium: Goodison Park; Attendance: 0 Referee: Stuart Attwell |

=== EFL Cup ===
The first round draw was made on 18 August, live on Sky Sports, by Paul Merson.

| 5 September 2020 First round | Salford City | 1–1 (4–2 p) | Rotherham United | Salford |
| 15:00 BST | Henderson 84' (pen.) | Report | Blackman (yellow card) 83'; Crooks 90+5' | Stadium: The Peninsula Stadium; Attendance: 0 Referee: James Oldham |
| | Penalties |
| | Touray (penalty scored); Henderson (penalty scored); Gibson (penalty scored); Thomas-Asante (penalty scored) | | Vassell (penalty missed); Ladapo (penalty scored); Sadlier (penalty scored); Mattock (penalty missed) |

== Transfers ==
=== Transfers in ===
| Date | Pos. | Nationality | Name | From | Fee | Ref. |
|---|---|---|---|---|---|---|
| 5 July 2020 | CF | (England) | Mickel Miller | (Scotland) Hamilton Academical | Free transfer | |
| 11 August 2020 | LW | (Republic of Ireland) | Kieran Sadlier | (England) Doncaster Rovers | Free transfer | |
| 15 August 2020 | CB | (England) | Angus MacDonald | (England) Hull City | Free transfer | |
| 20 August 2020 | CB | (England) | Wes Harding | (England) Birmingham City | Undisclosed | |
| 2 September 2020 | GK | (Sweden) | Viktor Johansson | (England) Leicester City | Free transfer | |
| 2 October 2020 | CM | (England) | Daniel Barlaser | (England) Newcastle United | Undisclosed | |
| 6 November 2020 | GK | (England) | Josh Vickers | Free agent | Free transfer | |

=== Loans in ===
| Date from | Pos. | Nationality | Name | From | Date until | Ref. |
|---|---|---|---|---|---|---|
| 24 August 2020 | GK | (England) | Jamal Blackman | (England) Chelsea | End of season | |
| 16 September 2020 | CF | (England) | George Hirst | (England) Leicester City | End of season | |
| 15 October 2020 | RW | (Suriname) | Florian Jozefzoon | (England) Derby County | End of season | |
| 26 January 2021 | LWB | (England) | Ryan Giles | (England) Wolverhampton Wanderers | End of season | |
| 1 February 2021 | CM | (England) | Lewis Wing | (England) Middlesbrough | End of season | |

=== Loans out ===
| Date from | Pos. | Nationality | Name | To | Date until | Ref. |
|---|---|---|---|---|---|---|
| 4 August 2020 | CF | (Nigeria) | Joshua Kayode | Carlisle United | End of season | |
| 15 September 2020 | CB | (England) | Jake Hull | Matlock Town | 28 October 2020 | |
| 18 September 2020 | CB | (England) | Jake Cooper | Gateshead | 4 January 2021 | |
| 15 October 2020 | CB | (Jamaica) | Curtis Tilt | Wigan Athletic | 4 January 2021 | |
| 16 October 2020 | CF | (England) | Jamie Proctor | Newport County | 19 January 2021 | |
| 14 January 2021 | CF | (England) | Mickel Miller | Northampton Town | End of season | |
| 15 January 2021 | CF | (Northern Ireland) | Kyle Vassell | Fleetwood Town | End of season | |
| 21 January 2021 | RB | (England) | Billy Jones | Crewe Alexandra | End of season | |
| 30 January 2021 | CB | (Jamaica) | Curtis Tilt | Wigan Athletic | End of season | |
| 1 February 2021 | CF | (England) | Jamie Proctor | Wigan Athletic | End of season | |
| 5 March 2021 | CB | (England) | Jake Cooper | Hartlepool | End of season | |

=== Transfers out ===
| Date | Pos. | Nationality | Name | To | Fee | Ref. |
|---|---|---|---|---|---|---|
| 1 July 2020 | LW | (France) | Julien Lamy | Free agent (Note: Lamy subsequently joined Grimsby Town on 6 February 2021.) | Released | |
| 1 July 2020 | GK | (England) | Laurence Bilboe | Free agent (Note: Bilboe subsequently joined Oldham Athletic on 16 October 2020.) | Released | |
| 21 July 2020 | CF | (England) | Jerry Yates | (England) Blackpool | Undisclosed | |
| 6 November 2020 | GK | (England) | Lewis Price | Free agent | Mutual consent | |
| 30 January 2021 | CB | (Northern Ireland) | Adam Thompson | (England) Leyton Orient | Mutual consent | |
