= 2019–20 Rotherham United F.C. season =

Rotherham United
2019–20 season
- Chairman: Tony Stewart
- Manager: Paul Warne
- Stadium: New York Stadium
- League One: 2nd (promoted)
- FA Cup: Third round
- EFL Cup: Second round
- EFL Trophy: Group stage
- Top goalscorer: League: Freddie Ladapo (14); All: Freddie Ladapo (17)
| Home colours | Away colours | Third colours |

The 2019–20 season was Rotherham United's 95th season in their existence and the first back in the League One following relegation last season. The club also participated in the FA Cup, the EFL Cup and the EFL Trophy.

== Key Events ==
Rotherham occupied second place in the League One table when the season was temporarily suspended on 31 March 2020, due to the COVID-19 pandemic.

Promotion back to the Championship was confirmed on 9 June 2020, when the EFL clubs voted to accept a proposal which would curtail the League One season and decide league positions on a points-per-game basis.

== Squad statistics ==
=== Player statistics ===
As of end of season.

Players with zero appearances have been unused substitutes in one or more games.

| No. | Pos. | Nat. | Name | Total | | League | | FA Cup | | EFL Cup | | EFL Trophy | | Discipline | |
| No. | Pos. | Nat. | Name | Apps | Goals | Apps | Goals | Apps | Goals | Apps | Goals | Apps | Goals | Yellow card | Red card |
|---|---|---|---|---|---|---|---|---|---|---|---|---|---|---|---|
| 1 | GK | (Denmark) | Daniel Iversen | 38 | 0 | 34 | 0 | 3 | 0 | 1 | 0 | 0 | 0 | 1 | 0 |
| 12 | GK | (Wales) | Lewis Price | 5 | 0 | 1 | 0 | 0 | 0 | 1 | 0 | 3 | 0 | 1 | 0 |
| 30 | GK | (England) | Laurence Bilboe | 0 | 0 | 0 | 0 | 0 | 0 | 0 | 0 | 0 | 0 | 0 | 0 |
| 2 | DF | (England) | Billy Jones | 11+1 | 0 | 9+1 | 0 | 1 | 0 | 0 | 0 | 1 | 0 | 4 | 0 |
| 3 | DF | (England) | Joe Mattock | 23+2 | 1 | 22+2 | 1 | 0 | 0 | 0 | 0 | 1 | 0 | 4 | 1 |
| 5 | DF | (Northern Ireland) | Adam Thompson | 12+2 | 0 | 9+1 | 0 | 2+1 | 0 | 0 | 0 | 1 | 0 | 2 | 1 |
| 6 | DF | (England) | Richard Wood | 26+2 | 4 | 21+2 | 3 | 2 | 0 | 2 | 1 | 1 | 0 | 3 | 0 |
| 15 | DF | (Scotland) | Clark Robertson | 21+1 | 2 | 17 | 2 | 1 | 0 | 2 | 0 | 1+1 | 0 | 3 | 0 |
| 18 | DF | (Republic of Ireland) | Trevor Clarke | 5+5 | 1 | 4+4 | 0 | 1 | 0 | 0 | 0 | 0+1 | 1 | 3 | 0 |
| 20 | DF | (England) | Michael Ihiekwe | 38 | 4 | 33 | 2 | 3 | 2 | 2 | 0 | 0 | 0 | 4 | 0 |
| 22 | DF | (United States) | Matthew Olosunde | 34+5 | 0 | 27+5 | 0 | 3 | 0 | 2 | 0 | 2 | 0 | 6 | 0 |
| 23 | DF | (England) | Curtis Tilt | 1 | 0 | 1 | 0 | 0 | 0 | 0 | 0 | 0 | 0 | 0 | 0 |
| 33 | DF | (England) | Jake Southern-Cooper | 3 | 0 | 0 | 0 | 0 | 0 | 0 | 0 | 3 | 0 | 0 | 0 |
| 4 | MF | (Wales) | Shaun MacDonald | 4+13 | 0 | 3+10 | 0 | 0 | 0 | 0+2 | 0 | 1+1 | 0 | 1 | 0 |
| 8 | MF | (England) | Ben Wiles | 35+5 | 3 | 28+5 | 3 | 3 | 0 | 2 | 0 | 2 | 0 | 2 | 0 |
| 11 | MF | (England) | Daniel Barlaser | 32+3 | 2 | 24+3 | 2 | 3 | 0 | 2 | 0 | 3 | 0 | 5 | 0 |
| 14 | MF | (England) | Hakeeb Adelakun | 8+1 | 0 | 8+1 | 0 | 0 | 0 | 0 | 0 | 0 | 0 | 0 | 0 |
| 16 | MF | (Scotland) | Jamie Lindsay | 16+12 | 1 | 14+8 | 1 | 0+1 | 0 | 0+2 | 0 | 2+1 | 0 | 2 | 0 |
| 17 | MF | (England) | Matt Crooks | 35+4 | 11 | 31+2 | 9 | 2+1 | 1 | 2 | 1 | 0+1 | 0 | 9 | 0 |
| 19 | MF | (Republic of Ireland) | Chiedozie Ogbene | 21+8 | 1 | 19+6 | 1 | 2+1 | 0 | 0 | 0 | 0+1 | 0 | 5 | 1 |
| 25 | MF | (England) | Josh Koroma | 0+5 | 0 | 0+5 | 0 | 0 | 0 | 0 | 0 | 0 | 0 | 0 | 0 |
| 26 | MF | (France) | Julien Lamy | 2+3 | 0 | 0+3 | 0 | 0 | 0 | 0 | 0 | 2 | 0 | 0 | 0 |
| 7 | FW | (Northern Ireland) | Kyle Vassell | 17+7 | 6 | 13+7 | 4 | 2 | 1 | 2 | 1 | 0 | 0 | 1 | 0 |
| 9 | FW | (England) | Jamie Proctor | 1+4 | 0 | 0+3 | 0 | 0 | 0 | 0+1 | 0 | 1 | 0 | 0 | 0 |
| 10 | FW | (England) | Freddie Ladapo | 26+13 | 17 | 20+11 | 14 | 1+2 | 2 | 2 | 1 | 3 | 0 | 2 | 0 |
| 21 | FW | (England) | Jerry Yates | 0+1 | 0 | 0+1 | 0 | 0 | 0 | 0 | 0 | 0 | 0 | 0 | 0 |
| 24 | FW | (England) | Michael Smith | 30+11 | 12 | 26+10 | 7 | 2+1 | 3 | 1+1 | 0 | 1+1 | 0 | 4 | 0 |
| 32 | FW | (Nigeria) | Joshua Kayode | 0+1 | 0 | 0 | 0 | 0 | 0 | 0 | 0 | 0+1 | 0 | 0 | 0 |
| 34 | FW | (England) | Jacob Gratton | 0 | 0 | 0 | 0 | 0 | 0 | 0 | 0 | 0 | 0 | 0 | 0 |
Players played for the club this season on loan who returned to their parent club during the season:
| 14 | FW | (England) | Carlton Morris | 15+12 | 4 | 11+10 | 3 | 2+1 | 0 | 1 | 0 | 2+1 | 1 | 3 | 0 |
| 23 | FW | (Scotland) | Jake Hastie | 11+5 | 3 | 10+4 | 3 | 0+1 | 0 | 0 | 0 | 1 | 0 | 0 | 0 |
Players played for the club this season who were permanently transferred out before the end of the season:
| 31 | DF | (England) | Akeem Hinds | 2 | 0 | 0 | 0 | 0 | 0 | 0 | 0 | 2 | 0 | 0 | 0 |

=== Goalscorers ===
As of end of season.

| Place | Position | Nation | Number | Name | Total | League | FA Cup | EFL Cup | Other |
|---|---|---|---|---|---|---|---|---|---|
| 1 | FW | (England) | 10 | Freddie Ladapo | 17 | 14 | 2 | 1 | 0 |
| 2 | FW | (England) | 24 | Michael Smith | 12 | 9 | 3 | 0 | 0 |
| 3 | MF | (England) | 17 | Matt Crooks | 11 | 9 | 1 | 1 | 0 |
| 4 | FW | (Northern Ireland) | 7 | Kyle Vassell | 6 | 4 | 1 | 1 | 0 |
| 5 | DF | (England) | 6 | Richard Wood | 4 | 3 | 0 | 1 | 0 |
| = | FW | (England) | 14 | Carlton Morris | 4 | 3 | 0 | 0 | 1 |
| = | DF | (England) | 20 | Michael Ihiekwe | 4 | 2 | 2 | 0 | 0 |
| 8 | MF | (England) | 8 | Ben Wiles | 3 | 3 | 0 | 0 | 0 |
| = | FW | (Scotland) | 23 | Jake Hastie | 3 | 3 | 0 | 0 | 0 |
| 10 | MF | (England) | 11 | Daniel Barlaser | 2 | 2 | 0 | 0 | 0 |
| = | DF | (Scotland) | 15 | Clark Robertson | 2 | 2 | 0 | 0 | 0 |
| 12 | DF | (England) | 3 | Joe Mattock | 1 | 1 | 0 | 0 | 0 |
| = | MF | (Scotland) | 16 | Jamie Lindsay | 1 | 1 | 0 | 0 | 0 |
| = | MF | (Republic of Ireland) | 19 | Chiedozie Ogbene | 1 | 1 | 0 | 0 | 0 |
| = | DF | (Republic of Ireland) | 18 | Trevor Clarke | 1 | 0 | 0 | 0 | 1 |

== Pre-season friendlies ==
The club confirmed their usual opening pre-season friendly with Parkgate on 9 May 2019. A second friendly, at Farsley Celtic was announced on 14 May. A third friendly at Chesterfield was announced on 16 May. On 21 May the first home friendly, against Leicester City, was announced. A trip to Bradford Park Avenue was confirmed on 23 May 2019. A second home friendly, against West Brom was announced on 24 May 2019.

On 28 May 2019 the club announced that 1. FC Magdeburg would be the opposition for one of the games to take place during their German training camp.

| 6 July 2019 Friendly | Parkgate | 0–7 | Rotherham United | Parkgate |
| 13:00 BST | | Report | Kayode 7'; Crooks 21', 42'; Smith 29'; Proctor 63', 73'; Morris 84' | Stadium: Roundwood Sports Complex |

| 14 July 2019 Friendly | 1. FC Magdeburg | 2–1 | Rotherham United | Schöningen, Lower Saxony |
| 14:00 CEST | Beck 6' (pen.); Kvesić 81' | Report | Vassell 64' | Stadium: Elm-Stadion |

| 16 July 2019 Friendly | Farsley Celtic | cancelled (Note: The friendly at Farsley was cancelled due to concerns over the state of the pitch.) | Rotherham United | Farsley, Leeds |
| 19:30 BST | | | | Stadium: Throstle Nest |

| 17 July 2019 Friendly | Bradford Park Avenue | 1–5 | Rotherham United | Bradford |
| 19:30 BST | Gardner 76' | Report | Ladapo 2'; Vassell 11', 29', 45'; Barlaser 39' | Stadium: Horsfall Stadium |

| 20 July 2019 Friendly | Chesterfield | 1–2 | Rotherham United | Chesterfield |
| 15:00 BST | Evans 29' | Report | Barlaser 26'; Smith 33' (pen.) | Stadium: Proact Stadium; Attendance: 1,675; Referee: Daniel Middleton |

| 23 July 2019 Friendly | Rotherham United | 1–1 | West Bromwich Albion | Rotherham |
| 19:45 BST | Ladapo 3' | Report | O'Shea 63' | Stadium: New York Stadium; Attendance: 2,484; Referee: Peter Bankes |

| 27 July 2019 Friendly | Rotherham United | 2–2 | Leicester City | Rotherham |
| 15:00 BST | Morris 38'; Ihiekwe 81' | Report | Iheanacho 11', 69' | Stadium: New York Stadium; Attendance: 3,818; Referee: Martin Coy |

== Competitions ==
=== League One ===
==== League table ====
| Pos | Team | Pld | W | D | L | GF | GA | GD | Pts | PPG | Promotion, qualification or relegation |
|---|---|---|---|---|---|---|---|---|---|---|---|
| 1 | Coventry City (C, P) | 34 | 18 | 13 | 3 | 48 | 30 | +18 | 67 | 1.97 | Promotion to the EFL Championship |
| 2 | Rotherham United (P) | 35 | 18 | 8 | 9 | 61 | 38 | +23 | 62 | 1.77 | Promotion to the EFL Championship |
| 3 | Wycombe Wanderers (O, P) | 34 | 17 | 8 | 9 | 45 | 40 | +5 | 59 | 1.74 | Qualification for League One play-offs (Note: Four teams play for one spot and promotion to the EFL Championship.) |
| 4 | Oxford United | 35 | 17 | 9 | 9 | 61 | 37 | +24 | 60 | 1.71 | Qualification for League One play-offs |
| 5 | Portsmouth | 35 | 17 | 9 | 9 | 53 | 36 | +17 | 60 | 1.71 | Qualification for League One play-offs |
| 6 | Fleetwood Town | 35 | 16 | 12 | 7 | 51 | 38 | +13 | 60 | 1.71 | Qualification for League One play-offs |
| 7 | Peterborough United | 35 | 17 | 8 | 10 | 68 | 40 | +28 | 59 | 1.69 | |
| 8 | Sunderland | 36 | 16 | 11 | 9 | 48 | 32 | +16 | 59 | 1.64 | |

Source: EFL Official Website
Rules for classification: 1) Points per game; 2) Goal difference; 3) Number of goals scored; 4) Head-to-head results; 5) Wins; 6) Away goals; 7) Penalty points (sec 9.5); 8) 12-point sending-off offences
(C) Champions; (O) Play-off winners; (P) Promoted

==== Results summary ====
| Overall | | | | | | | | Home | | | | | | Away | | | | | |
| Pld | W | D | L | GF | GA | GD | Pts | W | D | L | GF | GA | GD | W | D | L | GF | GA | GD |
|---|---|---|---|---|---|---|---|---|---|---|---|---|---|---|---|---|---|---|---|
| 35 | 18 | 8 | 9 | 61 | 38 | +23 | 62 | 8 | 5 | 4 | 31 | 16 | +15 | 10 | 3 | 5 | 30 | 22 | +8 |

Last updated: 7 March 2020.
Source: BBC

==== Results by matchday ====
| Matchday | 1 | 2 | 3 | 4 | 5 | 6 | 7 | 8 | 9 | 10 | 11 | 12 | 13 | 14 | 15 | 16 | 17 | 18 | 19 | 20 | 21 | 22 | 23 | 24 | 25 | 26 | 27 | 28 | 29 | 30 | 31 | 32 | 33 | 34 | 35 |
|---|---|---|---|---|---|---|---|---|---|---|---|---|---|---|---|---|---|---|---|---|---|---|---|---|---|---|---|---|---|---|---|---|---|---|---|
| Ground | A | H | A | H | A | H | A | H | A | H | A | H | A | H | A | H | A | A | H | A | H | A | H | H | A | H | A | H | H | A | H | A | A | H | A |
| Result | W | L | W | D | L | W | D | D | L | W | W | L | W | L | W | W | W | L | L | D | D | W | W | W | W | W | L | W | W | W | D | W | D | D | L |
| Position | 6 | 13 | 6 | 13 | 15 | 13 | 14 | 13 | 13 | 13 | 10 | 11 | 9 | 11 | 10 | 6 | 4 | 4 | 8 | 6 | 8 | 5 | 3 | 2 | 1 | 1 | 2 | 1 | 1 | 1 | 1 | 1 | 1 | 2 | 2 |

Updated to match(es) played on 7 March 2020. Source: Statto.com
A = Away; H = Home; W = Win; D = Draw; L = Loss

==== Matches ====
On Thursday, 20 June 2019, the EFL League One fixtures were revealed.

| 3 August 2019 1 | AFC Wimbledon | 1–2 | Rotherham United | Norbiton |
| 15:00 BST | Pigott 50'; Reilly (yellow card) 89' | Report | Ladapo 29'; Robertson 84' | Stadium: Cherry Red Records Stadium; Attendance: 4,657; Referee: Brett Huxtable |

| 10 August 2019 2 | Rotherham United | 0–2 | Lincoln City | Rotherham |
| 15:00 BST | Ladapo (yellow card) 16'; Crooks (yellow card) 51'; Vassell (yellow card) 59'; MacDonald (yellow card) 76' | Report | Morrell (yellow card) 21'; MacDonald 42' (o.g.); Anderson 48'; Toffolo (yellow card) 72' | Stadium: New York Stadium; Attendance: 10,706; Referee: Lee Swabey |

| 17 August 2019 3 | Burton Albion | 0–1 | Rotherham United | Burton upon Trent |
| 15:00 BST | | Report | O'Hara 24' (o.g.); Robertson (yellow card) 84' | Stadium: Pirelli Stadium; Attendance: 3,822; Referee: Nick Kinesley |

| 24 August 2019 | Portsmouth | v | Rotherham United | Milton |
| 15:00 BST | | | | Stadium: Fratton Park |
Note: The match was postponed on 18 July 2019 due to overriding safety concerns.

| 31 August 2019 4 | Rotherham United | 1–1 | Tranmere Rovers | Rotherham |
| 15:00 BST | Wiles 73'; Ogbene (yellow card) 89' | Report | Payne (yellow card) 45' (goal) 90+5'; Nelson (yellow card) 90+6'; Mullin (yellow card) 90+7' | Stadium: AESSEAL New York Stadium; Attendance: 8,691; Referee: Andy Haines |

| 7 September 2019 5 | Doncaster Rovers | 2–1 | Rotherham United | Doncaster |
| 12:30 BST | Anderson (yellow card) 45+1'; Coppinger 66'; Whiteman 88' (pen.) | Report | Hastie 37'; Wood (yellow card) 43'; Olosunde (yellow card) 57' | Stadium: The Keepmoat Stadium; Attendance: 11,407; Referee: Martin Coy |

| 14 September 2019 6 | Rotherham United | 6–1 | Bolton Wanderers | Rotherham |
| 15:00 BST | Wiles 14'; Ladapo 28', 53'; Lindsay (yellow card) 37'; Morris 40', 55'; Hastie 65'; Crooks (yellow card) 77' | Report | Verlinden 4' | Stadium: AESSEAL New York Stadium; Attendance: 10,088; Referee: Sebastian Stockbridge |

| 17 September 2019 7 | Sunderland | 1–1 | Rotherham United | Sunderland |
| 19:45 BST | McNulty 1'; McGeady (penalty missed) 29' (yellow card) 78'; Dobson (yellow card) 30'; McLaughlin (yellow card) 41' | Report | Hastie 66' | Stadium: Stadium of Light; Attendance: 29,078; Referee: Ben Toner |

| 21 September 2019 8 | Rotherham United | 0–0 | Shrewsbury Town | Rotherham |
| 15:00 BST | Jones (yellow card) 38' | Report | Laurent (yellow card) 68'; Beckles (yellow card) 80'; Goss (yellow card) 88' | Stadium: AESSEAL New York Stadium; Attendance: 8,380; Referee: Carl Boyeson |

| 28 September 2019 9 | Bristol Rovers | 1–0 | Rotherham United | Horfield |
| 15:00 BST | Clarke-Harris 48' | Report | | Stadium: Memorial Stadium; Attendance: 7,321; Referee: Michael Salisbury |

| 5 October 2019 10 | Rotherham United | 4–0 | Coventry City | Rotherham |
| 15:00 BST | Crooks 13', 75'; Smith 19' (pen.), 58' (pen.); Mattock (yellow card) 42'; Olosunde (yellow card) 45+2' | Report | McFadzean (red card) 57'; O'Hare (yellow card) 90+5' | Stadium: AESSEAL New York Stadium; Attendance: 10,337; Referee: Darren Handley |

| 12 October 2019 11 | Blackpool | 1–2 | Rotherham United | Blackpool |
| 15:00 BST | Scannell (yellow card) 10'; Feeney (yellow card) 49'; Guy (yellow card) 85'; Heneghan (yellow card) 90+5'; Virtue (yellow card) 90+8'; Gnanduillet 90+9' (pen.) | Report | Smith 51'; Olosunde (yellow card) 58'; Robertson 87'; Ogbene (yellow card) 90+1'; Clarke (yellow card) 90+8'; Iversen (yellow card) 90+9' | Stadium: Bloomfield Road; Attendance: 9,932; Referee: Christopher Pollard |

| 19 October 2019 12 | Rotherham United | 1–2 | Oxford United | Rotherham |
| 15:00 BST | Ihiekwe 35' | Report | Fosu 23'; Taylor 57' (yellow card) 83' | Stadium: AESSEAL New York Stadium; Attendance: 8,837; Referee: Scott Oldham |

| 23 October 2019 13 | Ipswich Town | 0–2 | Rotherham United | Ipswich |
| 19:45 BST | Edwards (yellow card) 78' | Report | Crooks 11', 48'; Clarke (yellow card) 29'; Jones (yellow card) 43'; Mattock (yellow card) 76' | Stadium: Portman Road; Attendance: 20,550 |

| 26 October 2019 14 | Rotherham United | 0–1 | Wycombe Wanderers | Rotherham |
| 15:00 BST | Smith (yellow card) 13'; Jones (yellow card) 19'; Crooks (yellow card) 76'; Morris (yellow card) 87' | Report | Kashket 5'; Aarons (yellow card) 7'; Stewart (yellow card) 17'; Pattison (yellow card) 50' | Stadium: AESSEAL New York Stadium; Attendance: 8,337; Referee: Neil Hair |

| 2 November 2019 15 | Gillingham | 0–3 | Rotherham United | Gillingham |
| 15:00 GMT | | Report | Smith (penalty missed) 18' 19'; Lindsay (yellow card) 28'; Crooks 43', 88' | Stadium: Priestfield Stadium; Attendance: 4,893; Referee: Lee Swabey |

| 16 November 2019 16 | Rotherham United | 1–0 | Accrington Stanley | Rotherham |
| 15:00 GMT | Ihiekwe (yellow card) 25'; Morris 30'; Roberston (yellow card) 37'; Ogbene (yellow card) 61' (yellow-red card) 82'; Jones (yellow card) 70' | Report | Johnson (yellow card) 23'; Evtimov (yellow card) 35'; Conneely (yellow card) 50' | Stadium: AESSEAL New York Stadium; Attendance: 8,430; Referee: Darren Handley |

| 23 November 2019 17 | Milton Keynes Dons | 2–3 | Rotherham United | Denbigh |
| 15:00 GMT | Gilbey 4' (yellow card) 56'; Mason 13'; Cargill (red card) 90+6' | Report | Crooks (yellow card) 42'; Ihiekwe (yellow card) 58'; Barlaser 66'; Ladapo 71', 86' (penalty missed) 73'; Morris (yellow card) 77' | Stadium: Stadium MK; Attendance: 7,811; Referee: Ross Joyce |

| 26 November 2019 18 | Portsmouth | 3–2 | Rotherham United | Milton |
| 19:45 GMT | Curtis 1'; Marquis 37'; Harrison (yellow card) 48'; Close 66' | Report | Ladapo 15', 62' (pen.); Ogbene (yellow card) 51'; Morris (yellow card) 89' | Stadium: Fratton Park; Attendance: 16,355; Referee: Antony Coggins |

| 7 December 2019 19 | Rotherham United | 0–1 | Rochdale | Rotherham |
| 15:00 GMT | Crooks (yellow card) 83'; Ogbene (yellow card) 87' | Report | Camps (yellow card) 16'; Morley 42'; Baah (yellow card) 87' | Stadium: AESSEAL New York Stadium; Attendance: 8,313; Referee: Chris Sarginson |

| 14 December 2019 20 | Southend United | 2–2 | Rotherham United | Southend-on-Sea |
| 15:00 GMT | Demetriou 49' (pen.); Mantom 52'; Goodship (yellow card) 80' | Report | Kiernan 30' (o.g.); Barlaser (yellow card) 37'; Smith (yellow card) 42'; Ogbene (yellow card) 48'; Ladapo 60'; Robertson (yellow card) 80'; Ihiekwe (yellow card) 80' | Stadium: Roots Hall; Attendance: 5,652; Referee: Charles Breakspear |

| 21 December 2019 21 | Rotherham United | 2–2 | Fleetwood Town | Rotherham |
| 15:00 GMT | Mattock (yellow card) 17'; Clarke (yellow card) 23'; Ladapo 62'; Thompson (yellow card) 78'; Crooks 80' | Report | Evans 26', 63'; Coyle (yellow card) 57' | Stadium: AESSEAL New York Stadium; Attendance: 7,883; Referee: Peter Wright |

| 26 December 2019 22 | Shrewsbury Town | 1–2 | Rotherham United | Shrewsbury |
| 15:00 GMT | Mattock 60'; Smith 90+7' | Report | Whalley (yellow card) 51'; Pierre 66'; Love; Golbourne (yellow card) 84' | Stadium: New Meadow; Attendance: 7,555; Referee: Marc Edwards |

| 29 December 2019 23 | Rotherham United | 4–0 | Peterborough United | Rotherham |
| 15:00 GMT | Wood 50'; Butler 68' (o.g.); Mattock (red card) 73'; Ward 77' (o.g.); Vassell 90+2' | Report | Kent (yellow card) 47' (yellow-red card) 54'; Toney (yellow card) 78' | Stadium: AESSEAL New York Stadium; Attendance: 9,019; Referee: Andy Haines |

| 1 January 2020 24 | Rotherham United | 2–1 | Blackpool | Rotherham |
| 15:00 GMT | Smith 21'; Barlaser 85'; Crooks (yellow card) 90+2' | Report | Gnanduillet 34'; Virtue (yellow card) 71'; Spearing (yellow card) 84'; Husband (yellow card) 90+3' | Stadium: New York Stadium; Attendance: 8,689; Referee: James Adcock |

| 4 January 2020 | Coventry City | v | Rotherham United | Bordesley |
| 15:00 GMT | | Report | | Stadium: St Andrew's Trillion Trophy Stadium |
Note: The match was postponed on 12 December due to both teams progression in the FA Cup.

| 11 January 2020 25 | Oxford United | 1–3 | Rotherham United | Oxford |
| 15:00 GMT | Rodriguez (yellow card) 8'; Browne 71'; Long (yellow card) 83' | Report | Vassell 16', 33'; Wood 45+6'; Wiles (yellow card) 52'; Lindsay (yellow card) 83' | Stadium: Kassam Stadium; Attendance: 8,077; Referee: David Webb |

| 18 January 2020 26 | Rotherham United | 3–0 | Bristol Rovers | Rotherham |
| 15:00 GMT | Crooks (yellow card) 33'; Vassell 51'; Smith 53'; Ogbene 88' | Report | Leahy (yellow card) 90+1'; Rodman (yellow card) 90+4' | Stadium: New York Stadium; Attendance: 8,287; Referee: Leigh Doughty |

| 25 January 2020 27 | Peterborough United | 2–1 | Rotherham United | Peterborough |
| 15:00 GMT | Toney 2'; Szmodics 22' (yellow card) 64' | Report | Ihiekwe 35'; Wiles (yellow card) 49' | Stadium: Weston Homes Stadium; Attendance: 7,495; Referee: Scott Oldham |

| 28 January 2020 28 | Rotherham United | 1–0 | Ipswich Town | Rotherham |
| 19:45 GMT | Crooks (yellow card) 37'; Wood 42'; Mattock (yellow card) 83' | Report | Huws (yellow card) 43'; Woolfenden (yellow card) 78' | Stadium: New York Stadium; Attendance: 9,327; Referee: Antony Coggins |

| 1 February 2020 29 | Rotherham United | 3–2 | Burton Albion | Rotherham |
| 15:00 GMT | Smith 9', 46'; Ladapo 71' (yellow card) 90+2' | Report | Murphy 7'; Sarkic (yellow card) 32' (goal) 47' | Stadium: AESSEAL New York Stadium; Attendance: 8,563; Referee: James Adcock |

| 7 February 2020 30 | Lincoln City | 0–1 | Rotherham United | Lincoln |
| 19:45 GMT | Bolger (yellow card) 19'; Melbourne (yellow card) 42' | Report | Crooks 47'; Smith (yellow card) 90+1' | Stadium: Sincil Bank; Attendance: 9,876; Referee: Martin Coy |

| 15 February 2020 31 | Rotherham United | 2–2 | AFC Wimbledon | Rotherham |
| 15:00 GMT | Crooks 60'; Ladapo 81' | Report | Sanders 30'; O'Neill (yellow card) 76'; Rudoni (yellow card) 87'; Appiah 90+3' (pen.) | Stadium: AESSEAL New York Stadium; Attendance: 8,626; Referee: Michael Salisbury |

| 22 February 2020 32 | Accrington Stanley | 1–2 | Rotherham United | Accrington |
| 15:00 GMT | Hughes (yellow card) 78'; Clark 85' | Report | Barlaser (yellow card) 55'; Ladapo 64'; Wiles 90+1' | Stadium: Wham Stadium; Attendance: 3,447; Referee: Seb Stockbridge |

| 25 February 2020 33 | Coventry City | 1–1 | Rotherham United | Bordesley |
| 19:45 GMT | Godden 47'; O'Hare (yellow card) 82' | Report | Ladapo 23'; Wood (yellow card) 25'; Olosunde (yellow card) 33'; Crooks (yellow card) 87' | Stadium: St Andrew's Trillion Trophy Stadium; Attendance: 8,990; Referee: Christopher Pollard |

| 29 February 2020 34 | Rotherham United | 1–1 | Milton Keynes Dons | Rotherham |
| 15:00 GMT | Ladapo 10'; Wood (yellow card) 61'; Olosunde (yellow card) 76' | Report | Healey 22'; Moore-Taylor (yellow card) 27'; Williams (yellow card) 60' | Stadium: AESSEAL New York Stadium; Attendance: 8,883; Referee: Leigh Doughty |

| 7 March 2020 35 | Rochdale | 3–1 | Rotherham United | Spotland |
| 15:00 GMT | Henderson 28', 70'; Williams (yellow card) 74'; Lund 75'; Sánchez (yellow card) 79' | Report | Lindsay 90+2' | Stadium: Crown Oil Arena; Attendance: 4,142; Referee: Ross Joyce |

| 14 March 2020 | Rotherham United | v | Southend United | Rotherham |
| 15:00 GMT | | | | Stadium: AESSEAL New York Stadium |
Note: Season was suspended until 3 April 2020, due to the COVID-19 pandemic.

| 21 March 2020 | Fleetwood Town | v | Rotherham United | Fleetwood |
| 15:00 GMT | | | | Stadium: Highbury Stadium |
Note: Season was suspended until 3 April 2020, due to the COVID-19 pandemic.

| 29 March 2020 | Rotherham United | v | Gillingham | Rotherham |
| 13:00 GMT | | | | Stadium: AESSEAL New York Stadium |
Note: Season was suspended until 3 April 2020, due to the COVID-19 pandemic.

| 4 April 2020 | Wycombe Wanderers | v | Rotherham United | High Wycombe |
| 15:00 GMT | | | | Stadium: Adams Park |
Note: On 3 April, the English Football League decided to postpone all football until safe to do so due to the COVID-19 pandemic.

| 10 April 2020 | Rotherham United | v | Portsmouth | Rotherham |
| 15:00 BST | | | | Stadium: AESSEAL New York Stadium |
Note: On 3 April, the English Football League decided to postpone all football until safe to do so due to the COVID-19 pandemic.

| 13 April 2020 | Tranmere Rovers | v | Rotherham United | Birkenhead |
| 13:00 BST | | | | Stadium: Prenton Park |
Note: On 3 April, the English Football League decided to postpone all football until safe to do so due to the COVID-19 pandemic.

| 18 April 2020 | Rotherham United | v | Doncaster Rovers | Rotherham |
| 15:00 BST | | | | Stadium: AESSEAL New York Stadium |
Note: On 3 April, the English Football League decided to postpone all football until safe to do so due to the COVID-19 pandemic.

| 25 April 2020 | Bolton Wanderers | v | Rotherham United | Bolton |
| 15:00 BST | | | | Stadium: University of Bolton Stadium |
Note: On 3 April, the English Football League decided to postpone all football until safe to do so due to the COVID-19 pandemic.

| 3 May 2020 | Rotherham United | v | Sunderland | Rotherham |
| 15:00 BST | | | | Stadium: AESSEAL New York Stadium |
Note: On 3 April, the English Football League decided to postpone all football until safe to do so due to the COVID-19 pandemic.

=== FA Cup ===
The first round draw was made on 21 October 2019. The second round draw was made live on 11 November from Chichester City's stadium, Oaklands Park. The third round draw was made live on BBC Two from Etihad Stadium, Micah Richards and Tony Adams conducted the draw.

| 9 November 2019 First round | Maidenhead United | 1–3 | Rotherham United | Maidenhead |
| 15:00 GMT | Cassidy 25'; Massey (red card) 54' | Report | Jones (yellow card) 28'; Ihiekwe 69'; Ladapo 75'; Crooks 78' | Stadium: York Road Stadium; Attendance: 1,924; Referee: Ollie Yates |

| 2 December 2019 Second round | Solihull Moors | 3–4 | Rotherham United | Solihull |
| 19:45 GMT | Osborne 6'; Gudger 8'; Boot (yellow card) 57'; Ball 62' | Report | Ladapo 76'; Ihiekwe 79'; Smith 88', 90+1' | Stadium: SportNation.bet Stadium; Attendance: 2,317; Referee: Carl Boyeson |

| 4 January 2020 Third round | Rotherham United | 2–3 | Hull City | Rotherham |
| 12:31 GMT | Smith 20'; Thompson (red card) 24'; Vassell 43'; Ihiekwe (yellow card) 72' | Report | Eaves 16', 66', 90+2' (yellow card) 90+3'; Lopes (yellow card) 86' | Stadium: AESSEAL New York Stadium; Attendance: 6,044; Referee: Anthony Backhouse |

=== EFL Cup ===
The first round draw was made on 20 June. The second round draw was made on 13 August 2019 following the conclusion of all but one first-round matches.

| 13 August 2019 First round | Shrewsbury Town | 0–4 | Rotherham United | Shrewsbury |
| 19:45 BST | Rowland (yellow card) 55' | Report | Crooks 2'; Vassell 3'; Ladapo 45'; Wood 84' | Stadium: Montgomery Waters Meadow; Attendance: 2,813; Referee: Anthony Backhouse |

| 28 August 2019 Second round | Rotherham United | 0–1 | Sheffield Wednesday | Rotherham |
| 19:45 BST | Barlaser (yellow card) 54' | Report | Pelupessy (yellow card) 58'; Bannan (yellow card) 85'; Nuhiu 90+6' | Stadium: AESSEAL New York Stadium; Attendance: 8,679; Referee: Charles Breakspear |

=== EFL Trophy ===
On 9 July 2019, the pre-determined group stage draw was announced with Invited clubs to be drawn on 12 July 2019.

==== Table ====
| Pos | Div | Team | Pld | W | PW | PL | L | GF | GA | GD | Pts | Qualification |
|---|---|---|---|---|---|---|---|---|---|---|---|---|
| 1 | ACA | Manchester United U21 | 3 | 3 | 0 | 0 | 0 | 5 | 1 | +4 | 9 | Advance to Round 2 |
| 2 | L1 | Doncaster Rovers | 3 | 1 | 0 | 0 | 2 | 6 | 6 | 0 | 3 | Advance to Round 2 |
| 3 | L1 | Lincoln City | 3 | 1 | 0 | 0 | 2 | 4 | 4 | 0 | 3 | |
| 4 | L1 | Rotherham United | 3 | 1 | 0 | 0 | 2 | 3 | 7 | −4 | 3 | |

Source: EFL.com

==== Matches ====
| 6 August 2019 Group stage | Rotherham United | 0–2 | Manchester United U21 | Rotherham |
| 19:00 BST | Barlaser (yellow card) 26'; Smith (yellow card) 71' | Report | Laird (yellow card) 30' (goal) 69'; Ramazani 73'; O'Connor (yellow card) 76' | Stadium: AESSEAL New York Stadium; Attendance: 3,105; Referee: Graham Salisbury |

| 8 October 2019 Group stage | Rotherham United | 3–2 | Doncaster Rovers | Rotherham |
| 19:00 BST | Wright 11' (o.g.); Morris 67' (penalty missed) 72'; Clarke 77' | Report | Sadlier 37'; Wright 54' | Stadium: AESSEAL New York Stadium; Attendance: 2,192; Referee: Marc Edwards |

| 12 November 2019 Group stage | Lincoln City | 3–0 | Rotherham United | Lincoln |
| 19:45 GMT | Akinde 12' (pen.), 14'; Walker 87' | Report | Olosunde (yellow card) 87'; Price (yellow card) 90+3' | Stadium: Sincil Bank; Attendance: 1,860; Referee: James Oldham |

== Transfers ==
=== Transfers in ===
| Date from | Nationality | Name | From | Fee | Ref. |
|---|---|---|---|---|---|
| 1 July 2019 | (Wales) | Shaun MacDonald | (England) Wigan Athletic | Free transfer | |
| 1 July 2019 | (England) | Freddie Ladapo | (England) Plymouth Argyle | Undisclosed | |
| 1 July 2019 | (France) | Julien Lamy | Free Agent | Free transfer | |
| 5 July 2019 | (United States) | Matthew Olosunde | Free Agent | Free transfer | |
| 24 July 2019 | (Scotland) | Jamie Lindsay | (Scotland) Ross County | Undisclosed | |
| 29 July 2019 | (Republic of Ireland) | Trevor Clarke | (Republic of Ireland) Shamrock Rovers | Undisclosed | |
| 27 August 2019 | (Northern Ireland) | Adam Thompson | (England) Bury | Free transfer | |
| 29 August 2019 | (Republic of Ireland) | Chiedozie Ogbene | (England) Brentford | Undisclosed | |
| 31 January 2020 | (England) | Curtis Tilt | (England) Blackpool | Undisclosed | |

=== Loans in ===
| Date from | Nationality | Name | From | Date until | Ref. |
|---|---|---|---|---|---|
| 1 July 2019 | (England) | Carlton Morris | (England) Norwich City | 8 January 2020 | |
| 3 July 2019 | (England) | Daniel Barlaser | (England) Newcastle United | 30 June 2020 | |
| 22 July 2019 | (Denmark) | Daniel Iversen | (England) Leicester City | 30 June 2020 | |
| 2 September 2019 | (Scotland) | Jake Hastie | (Scotland) Rangers | 28 January 2020 | |
| 9 January 2020 | (England) | Hakeeb Adelakun | (England) Bristol City | 30 June 2020 | |
| 31 January 2020 | (England) | Josh Koroma | (England) Huddersfield Town | 30 June 2020 | |

=== Loans out ===
| Date from | Nationality | Name | To | Date until | Ref. |
|---|---|---|---|---|---|
| 1 July 2019 | (England) | Jerry Yates | (England) Swindon Town | 21 January 2020 | |
| 5 July 2019 | (England) | Matt Palmer | (England) Bradford City | 31 January 2020 | |
| 2 August 2019 | (England) | Akeem Hinds | (England) Bradford (Park Avenue) | 22 August 2019 (Note: Originally January 2020, but was recalled.) | |
| 3 August 2019 | (Nigeria) | Joshua Kayode | (England) Gateshead | 9 January 2020 | |
| 7 August 2019 | (England) | Jacques Etia | (England) Brighouse Town | 30 June 2020 | |
| 30 August 2019 | (England) | Jamie Proctor | (England) Scunthorpe United | 20 January 2020 | |
| 14 November 2019 | (England) | Harrison Beeden | (England) Brighouse Town | 31 January 2020 | |
| 6 December 2019 | (Republic of Ireland) | Jake Cooper | (England) Gateshead | 25 April 2020 | |
| 15 January 2020 | (Nigeria) | Joshua Kayode | (England) Carlisle United | 30 June 2020; Or end of season whichever later | |
| 16 January 2020 | (England) | Jacob Gratton | (England) Scarborough Athletic | February 2020 | |
| 20 January 2020 | (England) | Jamie Proctor | (England) A.F.C. Fylde | 30 June 2020 | |
| 29 January 2020 | (England) | Jerry Yates | (England) Swindon Town | 30 June 2020 | |
| 31 January 2020 | (France) | Julien Lamy | (England) AFC Wimbledon | 30 June 2020 | |

=== Transfers out ===
| Date from | Nationality | Name | To | Fee | Ref. |
|---|---|---|---|---|---|
| 1 July 2019 | (England) | David Ball | Free agent (Note: David Ball subsequently signed for Wellington Phoenix.) | Released | |
| 1 July 2019 | (England) | Dominic Ball | Free agent (Note: Dominic Ball subsequently signed for Queens Park Rangers.) | Released | |
| 1 July 2019 | (Wales) | Alex Bray | Free agent (Note: Bray subsequently signed for Hereford.) | Released | |
| 1 July 2019 | (England) | Joe Newell | (Scotland) Hibernian | Contract expired | |
| 1 July 2019 | (England) | Manny Onariase | Free agent (Note: Onariase subsequently signed for Dagenham & Redbridge.) | Released | |
| 1 July 2019 | (Republic of Ireland) | Darren Potter | Free agent (Note: Potter subsequently signed for Tranmere Rovers.) | Released | |
| 1 July 2019 | (England) | Jon Taylor | Free agent (Note: Taylor subsequently signed for Doncaster Rovers.) | Contract expired | |
| 1 July 2019 | (Australia) | Ryan Williams | (England) Portsmouth | Contract expired | |
| 1 July 2019 | (Wales) | Will Vaulks | (Wales) Cardiff City | Undisclosed | |
| 1 July 2019 | (Northern Ireland) | Reece McGinley | Free agent (Note: McGinley subsequently joined Crusaders.) | Contract expired | |
| 1 July 2019 | (Northern Ireland) | Tyrone Lewthwaite | Free agent (Note: Lewthwaite subsequently joined Hampton & Richmond Borough.) | Contract expired | |
| 1 July 2019 | (Republic of Ireland) | Anthony Forde | Free agent (Note: Forde subsequently joined Oxford United.) | Contract expired | |
| 2 July 2019 | (England) | Ben Purrington | (England) Charlton Athletic | Undisclosed | |
| 20 July 2019 | (Nigeria) | Semi Ajayi | (England) West Bromwich Albion | Undisclosed | |
| 29 January 2020 | (England) | Akeem Hinds | Free Agent (Note: Hinds subsequently joined Lincoln City.) | Released | |
| 31 January 2020 | (England) | Matt Palmer | Free agent (Note: Palmer subsequently joined Swindon Town.) | Mutual consent | |
