= 2018–19 Rotherham United F.C. season =

Rotherham United
2018–19 season
- Chairman: Tony Stewart
- Manager: Paul Warne
- Stadium: New York Stadium
- Championship: 22nd (relegated)
- FA Cup: Third round (vs. Manchester City)
- EFL Cup: Second round (vs. Everton)
Home colours	Away colours	Third colours

The 2018–19 season was Rotherham United's 94th season in their existence and the first back in the Championship following promotion via the play-offs last season. The club will also participate in the FA Cup and the EFL Cup.

== Key Events ==
On 13 March 2019, Rotherham won away at Queens Park Rangers, claiming their first away win of the season, and their first win in the EFL Championship in 44 attempts, the last being on 9 April 2016.

Relegation from the EFL Championship was confirmed on the penultimate weekend of the season, 27 April 2019, when Rotherham lost away at West Bromwich Albion after Millwall had drawn their game earlier in the day.

== Squad statistics ==
=== Player statistics ===
As of end of season.

Players with zero appearances have been unused substitutes in one or more games.

No.	Pos.	Nat.	Name	Total		League		Playoffs		FA Cup		EFL Cup		Discipline	
No.	Pos.	Nat.	Name	Apps	Goals	Apps	Goals	Apps	Goals	Apps	Goals	Apps	Goals	Yellow card	Red card
1	GK	(Slovakia)	Marek Rodák	46	0	45	0	0	0	1	0	0	0	0	0
12	GK	(England)	Lewis Price	3	0	1	0	0	0	0	0	2	0	0	0
30	GK	(England)	Laurence Bilboe	0	0	0	0	0	0	0	0	0	0	0	0
2	DF	(England)	Zak Vyner	31+3	0	28+3	0	0	0	1	0	2	0	2	0
3	DF	(England)	Joe Mattock	45	1	44	1	0	0	1	0	0	0	12	0
5	DF	(Nigeria)	Semi Ajayi	49	8	46	7	0	0	1	0	2	1	5	0
6	DF	(England)	Richard Wood	24+4	2	23+3	2	0	0	0+1	0	0	0	6	0
15	DF	(Scotland)	Clark Robertson	28+3	3	25+3	3	0	0	1	0	2	0	4	0
20	DF	(England)	Michael Ihiekwe	15	2	15	2	0	0	0	0	0	0	3	0
28	DF	(England)	Billy Jones	20+2	0	19+2	0	0	0	0	0	1	0	5	1
29	DF	(England)	Manny Onariase	0	0	0	0	0	0	0	0	0	0	0	0
31	DF	(England)	Akeem Hinds	0	0	0	0	0	0	0	0	0	0	0	0
4	MF	(England)	Will Vaulks	42+1	8	41	7	0	0	1	0	0+1	1	10	1
7	MF	(Republic of Ireland)	Anthony Forde	20+11	1	17+11	1	0	0	1	0	2	0	1	0
8	MF	(England)	Matt Palmer	9+4	0	8+2	0	0	0	0+1	0	1+1	0	2	0
11	MF	(England)	Jon Taylor	31+13	4	30+11	4	0	0	1	0	0+2	0	3	0
13	MF	(Republic of Ireland)	Richie Towell	28+6	4	28+6	4	0	0	0	0	0	0	2	1
16	MF	(Republic of Ireland)	Darren Potter	0+1	0	0+1	0	0	0	0	0	0	0	0	0
17	MF	(England)	Matt Crooks	7+9	3	7+9	3	0	0	0	0	0	0	2	0
22	MF	(England)	Joe Newell	19+13	0	18+13	0	0	0	0	0	1	0	0	0
23	MF	(Australia)	Ryan Williams	26+15	1	24+15	1	0	0	1	0	1	0	2	0
25	MF	(England)	Ben Wiles	12+11	0	9+11	0	0	0	1	0	2	0	2	0
33	MF	(England)	Reece McGinley	0	0	0	0	0	0	0	0	0	0	0	0
35	MF	(England)	Jake Southern-Cooper	0	0	0	0	0	0	0	0	0	0	0	0
9	FW	(England)	Jamie Proctor	4+14	4	2+14	2	0	0	0	0	2	2	0	0
10	FW	(England)	David Ball	3	0	1	0	0	0	0	0	2	0	0	0
19	FW	(England)	Kyle Vassell	9+16	0	9+14	0	0	0	0	0	0+2	0	2	0
21	FW	(England)	Jerry Yates	3+4	0	3+4	0	0	0	0	0	0	0	1	0
24	FW	(England)	Michael Smith	45+1	8	44+1	8	0	0	1	0	0	0	4	0
32	FW	(Nigeria)	Joshua Kayode	0	0	0	0	0	0	0	0	0	0	0	0
34	FW	(Northern Ireland)	Tyrone Lewthwaite	0	0	0	0	0	0	0	0	0	0	0	0
Players played for the club this season on loan who returned to their parent club during the season:
17	MF	(Republic of Ireland)	Ryan Manning	13+5	4	13+5	4	0	0	0	0	0	0	4	0
26	DF	(England)	Sean Raggett	8+2	1	6+1	1	0	0	0+1	0	2	0	1	0

=== Goalscorers ===
As of end of season.

Place	Position	Nation	Number	Name	Total	League	Playoffs	FA Cup	EFL Cup
1	FW	(England)	24	Michael Smith	8	8	0	0	0
=	MF	(England)	4	Will Vaulks	8	7	0	0	1
=	DF	(Nigeria)	5	Semi Ajayi	8	7	0	0	1
4	MF	(England)	11	Jon Taylor	4	4	0	0	0
=	MF	(Republic of Ireland)	13	Richie Towell	4	4	0	0	0
=	MF	(Republic of Ireland)	17	Ryan Manning	4	4	0	0	0
=	FW	(England)	9	Jamie Proctor	4	2	0	0	2
8	DF	(Scotland)	15	Clark Robertson	3	3	0	0	0
=	MF	(England)	17	Matt Crooks	3	3	0	0	0
10	DF	(England)	6	Richard Wood	2	2	0	0	0
=	DF	(England)	20	Michael Ihiekwe	2	2	0	0	0
12	DF	(England)	3	Joe Mattock	1	1	0	0	0
=	MF	(Republic of Ireland)	7	Anthony Forde	1	1	0	0	0
=	MF	(Australia)	23	Ryan Williams	1	1	0	0	0
=	DF	(England)	26	Sean Raggett	1	1	0	0	0

== Pre-season friendlies ==
The first announcement from the club regarding pre-season friendlies came on 31 May 2018, when a game against Mansfield Town was confirmed. This was followed a day later by confirmation of the usual opening friendly with Parkgate. Later on 1 June, the club announced two split-squad friendlies on the same day against Stocksbridge Park Steels and Sheffield F.C. On 5 June the club announced a friendly against Premier League opposition, with Neil Warnock's newly promoted Cardiff City being hosted at New York Stadium. On 2 July the club announced a home friendly against Grimsby Town. This was subsequently cancelled on 6 July due to insufficient police resources being available. On 4 July the opposition for two friendlies during the clubs Austrian training camp was announced.

7 July 2018 Friendly	Parkgate	1–3	Rotherham United	Parkgate
12:00 BST	Collinson 74'	Report	Smith 5'; Forde 68', 87'	Stadium: Roundwood Sports Complex

10 July 2018 Friendly	Rotherham United	0–0	SKU Amstetten	Enzesfeld-Lindabrunn, Austria
10:30 CEST		Report		Stadium: Sportschule Lindabrunn

14 July 2018 Friendly	SC Wiener Neustadt	0–1	Rotherham United	Wiener Neustadt, Austria
17:00 CEST		Report	Smith 2'	Stadium: Stadion Wiener Neustadt

17 July 2018 Friendly	Stocksbridge Park Steels	1–4	Rotherham United	Stocksbridge, Sheffield
19:30 BST	Ruthven 22'	Report	Vassell 11', 34', 85'; Hinds 65'	Stadium: Bracken Moor

17 July 2018 Friendly	Sheffield	0–3	Rotherham United	Dronfield
19:30 BST		Report	Smith 50', 88'; David Ball 88'	Stadium: Coach and Horses Ground

25 July 2018 Friendly	Rotherham United	2–1	Cardiff City	Rotherham
19:45 BST	Palmer 31'; Smith 78'	Report	Murphy 13'	Stadium: New York Stadium; Attendance: 2,455; Referee: Scott Duncan

28 July 2018 Friendly	Mansfield Town	2–1	Rotherham United	Mansfield
15:00 BST	Davies; Walker	Report	Raggett	Stadium: Field Mill; Attendance: 2,083; Referee: Darren England

== Competitions ==
=== Championship ===
==== League table ====
Pos	Team	Pld	W	D	L	GF	GA	GD	Pts	Promotion, qualification or relegation
19	Queens Park Rangers	46	14	9	23	53	71	−18	51	
20	Reading	46	10	17	19	49	66	−17	47	
21	Millwall	46	10	14	22	48	64	−16	44	
22	Rotherham United (R)	46	8	16	22	52	83	−31	40	Relegation to EFL League One
23	Bolton Wanderers (R)	46	8	8	30	29	78	−49	32 (Note: Brentford were awarded a 1–0 win over Bolton due to Bolton's inability to hold the fixture.)	Relegation to EFL League One
24	Ipswich Town (R)	46	5	16	25	36	77	−41	31	Relegation to EFL League One

Source: Sky Sports Archived 25 September 2019 at the Wayback Machine
Rules for classification: 1) Points; 2) Goal difference; 3) Number of goals scored; 4) Head-to-head results
(R) Relegated

==== Results summary ====
Overall								Home						Away					
Pld	W	D	L	GF	GA	GD	Pts	W	D	L	GF	GA	GD	W	D	L	GF	GA	GD
46	8	16	22	52	83	−31	40	7	8	8	32	38	−6	1	8	14	20	45	−25

Last updated: 5 May 2019.
Source: BBC

==== Results by matchday ====
Matchday	1	2	3	4	5	6	7	8	9	10	11	12	13	14	15	16	17	18	19	20	21	22	23	24	25	26	27	28	29	30	31	32	33	34	35	36	37	38	39	40	41	42	43	44	45	46
Ground	A	H	A	H	H	A	H	A	A	H	H	A	H	A	A	H	A	H	H	A	A	H	H	A	A	H	A	H	H	A	H	A	H	A	H	A	A	H	A	H	H	A	A	H	A	H
Result	L	W	L	L	W	L	W	L	L	D	D	L	D	D	D	W	D	D	D	L	D	D	L	L	L	W	L	L	L	D	D	D	D	D	W	L	W	L	L	W	L	D	L	L	L	L
Position	24	13	15	17	15	15	14	15	19	18	19	19	20	20	21	18	19	19	19	20	20	20	20	21	22	21	21	21	21	21	21	21	22	22	22	22	22	22	22	22	22	22	22	22	22	22

Updated to match(es) played on 5 May 2019. Source: Statto.com
A = Away; H = Home; W = Win; D = Draw; L = Loss

==== Matches ====
4 August 2018 1	Brentford	5–1	Rotherham United	Brentford
15:00 BST	Maupay 4', 60'; Canós 44'; Watkins 48'; Macleod 89'	Report	Wood (yellow card) 9'; Vaulks (yellow card) 43' (goal) 90+2'	Stadium: Griffin Park; Attendance: 10,297; Referee: Oliver Langford

11 August 2018 2	Rotherham United	1–0	Ipswich Town	Rotherham
15:00 BST	Palmer (yellow card) 42'; Vaulks (yellow card) 71'; Smith 90'	Report		Stadium: New York Stadium; Attendance: 9,460; Referee: David Webb

18 August 2018 3	Leeds United	2–0	Rotherham United	Leeds
15:00 BST	Ayling 49'; Roofe 71'	Report	Taylor (yellow card) 16'	Stadium: Elland Road; Attendance: 33,699; Referee: Robert Jones

21 August 2018 4	Rotherham United	2–3	Hull City	Rotherham
19:45 BST	Wood 16' (yellow card) 86'; Proctor 75'	Report	Irvine 28', 47'; Campbell 45+1'; Henriksen (yellow card) 46'	Stadium: New York Stadium; Attendance: 8,962; Referee: Jeremy Simpson

26 August 2018 5	Rotherham United	1–0	Millwall	Rotherham
12:30 BST	Raggett 20'; Manning (yellow card) 51'	Report	Wallace (yellow card) 22'; McLaughlin (yellow card) 89'	Stadium: New York Stadium; Attendance: 8,197; Referee: Geoff Eltringham

1 September 2018 6	Wigan Athletic	1–0	Rotherham United	Wigan
15:00 BST	Morsy (yellow card) 57'; Vaughan 73'; Kipré (yellow card) 80'	Report	Taylor (yellow card) 5'; Williams (yellow card) 38'; Wood (yellow card) 45'	Stadium: DW Stadium; Attendance: 9,584; Referee: Scott Duncan

15 September 2018 7	Rotherham United	1–0	Derby County	Rotherham
15:00 BST	Wood (yellow card) 48'; Vassell (yellow card) 59'; Manning 63' (pen.); Mattock (yellow card) 67'; Taylor (yellow card) 90+6'	Report	Lawrence (red card) 58'; Waghorn (yellow card) 58'; Mount (yellow card) 60'; Keogh (yellow card) 63'; Johnson (yellow card) 87'	Stadium: New York Stadium; Attendance: 10,707; Referee: Peter Bankes

18 September 2018 8	Aston Villa	2–0	Rotherham United	Aston
19:45 BST	Abraham 27' (yellow card) 68'; El Ghazi (yellow card) 37'; Bolasie 82'	Report	Ajayi (yellow card) 65'; Mattock (yellow card) 73'	Stadium: Villa Park; Attendance: 27,991; Referee: Andy Davies

22 September 2018 9	Nottingham Forest	1–0	Rotherham United	West Bridgford
15:00 BST	Guedioura (yellow card) 32'; Grabban 86' (pen.)	Report	Jones (yellow card) 33'; Towell (yellow card) 86'; Vaulks (yellow card) 90+2'	Stadium: City Ground; Attendance: 27,479; Referee: Robert Jones

29 September 2018 10	Rotherham United	2–2	Stoke City	Rotherham
17:30 BST	Manning 47' (pen.); Towell 50'	Report	Ince 59'; Bojan 85'	Stadium: New York Stadium; Attendance: 9,706; Referee: Tony Harrington

3 October 2018 11	Rotherham United	0–0	Bristol City	Rotherham
19:45 BST	Manning (yellow card) 77'; Smith (yellow card) 88'	Report	Kelly (yellow card) 77'; Hunt (yellow card) 84'; Brownhill (yellow card) 90+4'	Stadium: New York Stadium; Attendance: 8,187; Referee: Gavin Ward

6 October 2018 12	Birmingham City	3–1	Rotherham United	Birmingham
15:00 BST	Jutkiewicz 20', 23', 68'	Report	Mattock (yellow card) 50'; Taylor 77'	Stadium: St Andrew's; Attendance: 19,795; Referee: Keith Stroud

20 October 2018 13	Rotherham United	1–1	Bolton Wanderers	Rotherham
15:00 BST	Vaulks 57'; Manning (yellow card) 81'; Mattock (yellow card) 89'	Report	Lowe (yellow card) 24'; Doidge 84'; Vela (yellow card) 90'	Stadium: New York Stadium; Attendance: 10,011; Referee: John Brooks

23 October 2018 14	Middlesbrough	0–0	Rotherham United	Middlesbrough
19:45 BST		Report	Vaulks (yellow card) 48'	Stadium: Riverside Stadium; Attendance: 21,235; Referee: Darren Bond

27 October 2018 15	Preston North End	1–1	Rotherham United	Preston
15:00 BST	Barkhuizen 40'; Maguire (yellow card) 90'	Report	Smith 55'; Towell (yellow card) 84'	Stadium: Deepdale; Attendance: 11,780; Referee: Jeremy Simpson

3 November 2018 16	Rotherham United	2–1	Swansea City	Rotherham
15:00 GMT	Vaulks (yellow card) 22'; Smith (yellow card) 22'; Manning 79' (pen.), 87' (pen.)	Report	Fer (yellow card) 22'; McBurnie 25'; Celina (yellow card) 74'; McBurnie (yellow card) 86' van der Hoorn (yellow card) 90'	Stadium: New York Stadium; Attendance: 9,006; Referee: Tony Harrington

10 November 2018 17	Blackburn Rovers	1–1	Rotherham United	Blackburn
15:00 GMT	Dack 81'	Report	Smith 75', (yellow card) 79'	Stadium: Ewood Park; Attendance: 12,847; Referee: David Webb

24 November 2018 18	Rotherham United	2–2	Sheffield United	Rotherham
12:30 GMT	Taylor 66'; Proctor 90+2'	Report	Duffy 8'; Basham (yellow card) 62' (goal) 85'	Stadium: New York Stadium; Attendance: 11,607; Referee: Peter Bankes

27 November 2018 19	Rotherham United	2–2	Queens Park Rangers	Rotherham
19:45 GMT	Vaulks 6'; Robertson 15'	Report	Wells 12'; Bidwell (yellow card) 23'; Wszołek (yellow card) 35'; Freeman 90+1'	Stadium: New York Stadium; Attendance: 8,018; Referee: Andy Woolmer

1 December 2018 20	Norwich City	3–1	Rotherham United	Norwich
15:00 GMT	Cantwell 55'; Aarons 71'; Pukki 84'	Report	Towell 11'	Stadium: Carrow Road; Attendance: 25,858; Referee: Steve Martin

8 December 2018 21	Sheffield Wednesday	2–2	Rotherham United	Owlerton, Sheffield
15:00 GMT	Bannan (yellow card) 20'; João 45+1', 64'	Report	Smith 46'; Towell 55'	Stadium: Hillsborough; Attendance: 24,725; Referee: Darren Bond

15 December 2018 22	Rotherham United	1–1	Reading	Rotherham
15:00 GMT	Mattock (yellow card) 45+2' (goal) 90'	Report	Sims (yellow card) 6'; Baldock 9'	Stadium: New York Stadium; Attendance: 8,775; Referee: Ross Joyce

22 December 2018 23	Rotherham United	0–4	West Bromwich Albion	Rotherham
15:00 GMT	Mattock (yellow card) 44'	Report	Gayle 6', 44', 54'; Barnes 20'; Barry (yellow card) 29'; Johnstone (yellow card) 31'	Stadium: New York Stadium; Attendance: 10,593; Referee: Tony Harrington

26 December 2018 24	Bolton Wanderers	2–1	Rotherham United	Horwich
15:00 GMT	Ameobi 33'; Wilson (yellow card) 51'; O'Neil 65'	Report	Robertson (yellow card) 13'; Vaulks 37'	Stadium: University of Bolton Stadium; Attendance: 15,255; Referee: Jeremy Simpson

29 December 2018 25	Bristol City	1–0	Rotherham United	Bristol
15:00 GMT	Hunt (yellow card) 44'; Dasilva (yellow card) 71'; Webster 86'	Report	Jones (yellow card) 51' (yellow-red card) 64'; Towell (red card) 72'; Manning (yellow card) 90+5'	Stadium: Ashton Gate Stadium; Attendance: 21,207; Referee: Scott Duncan

1 January 2019 26	Rotherham United	2–1	Preston North End	Rotherham
15:00 GMT	Palmer (yellow card) 12'; Raggett (yellow card) 29'; Vaulks 45+1' (yellow card) 74'; Smith 76' (yellow card) 83'; Wiles (yellow card) 82'	Report	Ledson (yellow card) 31'; Nmecha 78'	Stadium: New York Stadium; Attendance: 9,077; Referee: Lee Probert

12 January 2019 27	Ipswich Town	1–0	Rotherham United	Ipswich
15:00 GMT	Keane 31'; Skuse (yellow card) 45+3'; Sears (yellow card) 67'	Report	Vyner (yellow card) 2'	Stadium: Portman Road; Attendance: 20,893; Referee: James Linington

19 January 2019 28	Rotherham United	2–4	Brentford	Rotherham
15:00 GMT	Taylor 20'; Konsa 73' (o.g.); Yates (yellow card) 80'	Report	Mokotjo 2', 75'; Benrahma 53'; Maupay 85'	Stadium: New York Stadium; Attendance: 8,319; Referee: Tony Harrington

26 January 2019 29	Rotherham United	1–2	Leeds United	Rotherham
15:00 GMT	Ajayi 28'; Robertson (yellow card) 79'	Report	Klich 51', 86'; Casilla (yellow card) 90+3'; Phillips (yellow card) 90+7'	Stadium: New York Stadium; Attendance: 11,259; Referee: Tim Robinson

2 February 2019 30	Millwall	0–0	Rotherham United	Bermondsey
15:00 GMT		Report	Robertson (yellow card) 40'; Wood (yellow card) 58'; Crooks (yellow card) 86'; Vassell (yellow card) 90+1'	Stadium: The Den; Attendance: 12,084; Referee: Andrew Madley

9 February 2019 31	Rotherham United	1–1	Wigan Athletic	Rotherham
15:00 GMT	Robertson 28'; Forde (yellow card) 88'	Report	Windass 32' (yellow card) 67'; Kipré (yellow card) 54'; Pilkington (yellow card) 80'	Stadium: New York Stadium; Attendance: 9,611; Referee: Oliver Langford

12 February 2019 32	Hull City	2–2	Rotherham United	Kingston upon Hull
19:45 GMT	Bowen 2'; Campbell 23'	Report	Forde 48'; McKenzie 55' (o.g.); Vyner (yellow card) 90+1'	Stadium: KCOM Stadium; Attendance: 10,785; Referee: Scott Duncan

16 February 2019 33	Rotherham United	2–2	Sheffield Wednesday	Rotherham
13:00 GMT	Mattock (yellow card) 27'; Taylor 37'; Ajayi (yellow card) 39'; Jones (yellow card) 54'; Ihiekwe (yellow card) 61'; Towell 74'	Report	Forestieri 35' (yellow card) 90+4' (yellow-red card) 90+11'; Boyd (yellow card) 67'; Iorfa 90+10'	Stadium: New York Stadium; Attendance: 11,736; Referee: Darren England

23 February 2019 34	Reading	1–1	Rotherham United	Reading
15:00 GMT	Ejaria 31'; Swift (yellow card) 54'	Report	Mattock (yellow card) 50'; Williams (yellow card) 59'; Ajayi 79'; Vaulks (yellow card) 89'	Stadium: Madejski Stadium; Attendance: 15,958; Referee: Jeremy Simpson

2 March 2019 35	Rotherham United	3–2	Blackburn Rovers	Rotherham
15:00 GMT	Ajayi 2', 83'; Robertson (yellow card) 30'; Mattock (yellow card) 50'; Williams 57'; Ihiekwe (yellow card) 90+3'	Report	Smallwood (yellow card) 8'; Bell 51'; Mulgrew 90+3' (pen.)	Stadium: New York Stadium; Attendance: 9,663; Referee: John Brooks

9 March 2019 36	Sheffield United	2–0	Rotherham United	Sheffield
12:15 GMT	O'Connell 5'; Duffy 74'	Report	Vaulks (red card) 28'	Stadium: Bramall Lane; Attendance: 27,402; Referee: Geoff Eltringham

13 March 2019 37	Queens Park Rangers	1–2	Rotherham United	Shepherd's Bush
19:45 GMT	Bidwell (yellow card) 43'; Osayi-Samuel 85'; Furlong (yellow card) 90+4'	Report	Mattock (yellow card) 17'; Ajayi 71', 90+5'	Stadium: Loftus Road; Attendance: 10,854; Referee: David Webb

16 March 2019 38	Rotherham United	1–2	Norwich City	Rotherham
15:00 GMT	Ihiekwe (yellow card) 17'; Jones (yellow card) 29'; Ajayi 52'	Report	McLean 45'; Godfrey 57'; Stiepermann (yellow card) 64'; Aarons (yellow card) 88'	Stadium: New York Stadium; Attendance: 11,026; Referee: Oliver Langford

30 March 2019 39	Derby County	6–1	Rotherham United	Derby
15:00 GMT	Waghorn 13' (pen.), 42', 71' (pen.); Johnson 39'; Mount 48'; Holmes 62'	Report	Wood 53'; Crooks (yellow card) 90+2'	Stadium: Pride Park Stadium; Attendance: 27,003; Referee: Tim Robinson

6 April 2019 40	Rotherham United	2–1	Nottingham Forest	Rotherham
15:00 BST	Smith 10'; Ihiekwe 60'	Report	Grabban 28'; Janko (yellow card) 42'	Stadium: New York Stadium; Attendance: 11,012; Referee: Stephen Martin

10 April 2019 41	Rotherham United	1–2	Aston Villa	Rotherham
19:45 BST	Vaulks 36' (pen.) (yellow card) 75'; Ajayi (yellow card) 47'; Mattock (yellow card) 61'	Report	Abraham (penalty missed) 12' (yellow card) 90+2'; Mings (yellow card) 18' (yellow-red card) 34'; Kodjia 48' (pen.); Grealish 51'	Stadium: New York Stadium; Attendance: 10,558; Referee: Andrew Madley

13 April 2019 42	Stoke City	2–2	Rotherham United	Stoke-on-Trent
15:00 BST	Vokes 27'; Clucas 29'	Report	Smith 58'; Vaulks (yellow card) 60'; Crooks 74'	Stadium: Bet365 Stadium; Attendance: 24,250; Referee: Andy Woolmer

19 April 2019 43	Swansea City	4–3	Rotherham United	Swansea
15:00 BST	McBurnie 36', 79'; McKay 50'; Byers 69'	Report	Ihiekwe 10'; Ajayi (yellow card) 13'; Crooks 38'; Vaulks 83'	Stadium: Liberty Stadium; Attendance: 18,527; Referee: Keith Stroud

22 April 2019 44	Rotherham United	1–3	Birmingham City	Rotherham
15:00 BST	Ajayi (yellow card) 5'; Crooks 22'; Wood (yellow card) 50'; Vaulks (yellow card) 73'	Report	Maghoma 56'; Jota 63'; Gardner (yellow card) 75'; Mrabti 90+3'	Stadium: New York Stadium; Attendance: 10,703; Referee: Andy Davies

27 April 2019 45	West Bromwich Albion	2–1	Rotherham United	West Bromwich
15:00 BST	Rodriguez 77' (pen.); Harper 79'	Report	Mattock (yellow card) 37'; Robertson 50'; Jones (yellow card) 66'	Stadium: The Hawthorns; Referee: Robert Jones

5 May 2019 46	Rotherham United	1–2	Middlesbrough	Rotherham
12:30 BST	Smith 86' (pen.)	Report	Assombalonga 28' (pen.); Obi Mikel 37' (yellow card) 90+2'	Stadium: New York Stadium; Attendance: 11,051; Referee: Andrew Madley

=== FA Cup ===
The third round draw was made live on BBC by Ruud Gullit and Paul Ince from Stamford Bridge on 3 December 2018.

6 January 2019 Third round	Manchester City	7–0	Rotherham United	Manchester
14:00 GMT	Sterling 12' (yellow card) 35'; Foden 43'; Ajayi 45+1' (o.g.); Jesus 52'; Mahrez 73'; Otamendi 78'; Sané 85'	Report	Wiles (yellow card) 24'	Stadium: City of Manchester Stadium; Referee: David Coote

=== EFL Cup ===
On 15 June 2018, the draw for the first round was made in Vietnam. The second round draw was made from the Stadium of Light on 16 August.

13 August 2018 First round	Rotherham United	3–1	Wigan Athletic	Rotherham
19:00 BST	Proctor 37', 64'; Ajayi 42'	Report	Bruce (yellow card) 25'; Vaughan 74'	Stadium: New York Stadium; Attendance: 3,017; Referee: Peter Bankes

29 August 2018 Second round	Everton	3–1	Rotherham United	Walton
19:45 BST	Sigurðsson 28'; Digne (yellow card) 52'; Calvert-Lewin 62', 89'	Report	Vaulks 86'	Stadium: Goodison Park; Attendance: 31,972; Referee: Graham Scott

== Transfers ==
=== Transfers in ===
Date from	Nationality	Name	To	Fee	Ref.
1 July 2018	(Scotland)	Clark Robertson	Blackpool	Free	
1 July 2018	(England)	Kyle Vassell	Blackpool	Free	
20 July 2018	(England)	Billy Jones	Sunderland	Free	
11 January 2019	(England)	Matt Crooks	Northampton Town	Undisclosed	

=== Transfers out ===
Date from	Nationality	Name	To	Fee	Ref.
1 July 2018	(England)	Darnelle Bailey-King	Free agent	Released	
1 July 2018	(England)	Jonson Clarke-Harris	Coventry City	Released	
1 July 2018	(Jamaica)	Shaun Cummings	Free agent	Released	
1 July 2018	(England)	Kuda Muskwe	Free agent	Released	
1 July 2018	(England)	Mason Warren	Free agent	Released	
1 August 2018	(Northern Ireland)	Thomas Maguire	(Northern Ireland) Cliftonville	Free	
14 August 2018	(England)	George McMahon	Burnley	Free	

=== Loans in ===
Start date	Nationality	Name	From	End date	Ref.
2 July 2018	(England)	Zak Vyner	Bristol City	31 May 2019	
25 July 2018	(England)	Sean Raggett	Norwich City	8 March 2019	
25 July 2018	(Slovakia)	Marek Rodák	Fulham	31 May 2019	
16 August 2018	(Republic of Ireland)	Ryan Manning	Queens Park Rangers	1 January 2019	
31 August 2018	(Republic of Ireland)	Richie Towell	Brighton & Hove Albion	31 May 2019	

=== Loans out ===
Start date	Nationality	Name	To	End date	Ref.
18 July 2018	(England)	Dominic Ball	(Scotland) Aberdeen	31 May 2019	
20 July 2018	(England)	Jerry Yates	Carlisle United	1 January 2019	
1 August 2018	(England)	Ben Purrington	AFC Wimbledon	10 January 2019	
24 August 2018	(England)	Michael Ihiekwe	Accrington Stanley	2 January 2019	
3 September 2018	(England)	David Ball	Bradford City	31 May 2019	
18 September 2018	(England)	Akeem Hinds	Frickley Athletic	18 October 2018	
19 September 2018	(Nigeria)	Joshua Kayode	Chesterfield	17 October 2018	
25 October 2018	(Nigeria)	Manny Onariase	Dagenham & Redbridge	31 May 2019	
9 November 2018	(Wales)	Alex Bray	York City	12 January 2019	
2 January 2019	(Northern Ireland)	Reece McGinley	(Northern Ireland) Crusaders	31 May 2019	
10 January 2019	(England)	Ben Purrington	Charlton Athletic	31 May 2019	
12 February 2019	(Wales)	Alex Bray	Weston-super-Mare	27 April 2019	
22 February 2019	(England)	Laurence Bilboe	Stratford Town	March 2019	
8 March 2019	(England)	Akeem Hinds	Hyde United	April 2019	
3 April 2019	(England)	Laurence Bilboe	Havant & Waterlooville	31 May 2019	
