= Matthew Olosunde =

American soccer player (born 1998)

Matt Olosunde
Personal information
- Full name: Matthew Olawale Olosunde
- Date of birth: March 7, 1998 (age 28)
- Place of birth: Philadelphia, Pennsylvania, United States
- Height: 6 ft 1 in (1.85 m)
- Position: Right-back

Team information
- Current team: Carrick Rangers
- Number: 34

Youth career
- 2005–2012: Princeton Futbol Club
- 2012–2015: New York Red Bulls
- 2016–2019: Manchester United

Senior career*
Years	Team	Apps	(Gls)
2017–2019	Manchester United	0	(0)
2019–2021	Rotherham United	64	(0)
2021–2023	Preston North End	2	(0)
2024–2025	The New Saints	1	(0)
2026–	Carrick Rangers	8	(1)

International career^{‡}
2013–2015	United States U17	30	(0)
2016	United States U20	3	(0)
2019	United States U23	1	(0)
2018	United States	1	(0)
- * Club domestic league appearances and goals as of April 29, 2026 ‡ National team caps and goals as of May 28, 2018

Matthew Olawale Olosunde (born March 7, 1998) is an American professional soccer player who plays as a right-back for NIFL Premiership club Carrick Rangers.

== Club career ==
=== New York Red Bulls ===
Born in Philadelphia and raised in Trenton, New Jersey, Olosunde began his career at New York Red Bulls Academy as a right-winger, and represented the club's under-16 and under-18 academy teams.

On August 16, 2014, he played 71 minutes for the New York Red Bulls Reserves in a 1–0 win over the Wilmington Hammerheads in the United Soccer League.

Having verbally committed to play college soccer at Duke University, Olosunde left the Red Bulls following the 2015 FIFA Under-17 World Cup to further his education.

=== Manchester United ===
In January 2016, it was announced that Olosunde would join Premier League club Manchester United. It was reported that the club had offered him online courses at the University of Oxford to persuade him to join. He received international clearance and officially joined the team on March 11.

He initially joined the Under-18 set-up, and was promoted to the Under-23 team ahead of the 2016–17 season. He made 18 appearances in his inaugural Premier League 2 campaign.

In April 2017, Olosunde was nominated for the club's Goal of the Month Award for his solo effort against Real Salt Lake in the Dallas Cup.

The following month, he traveled with the first team squad to Premier League games against Arsenal and Tottenham Hotspur. In June 2019, Olosunde was released by Manchester United.

=== Rotherham United ===
On July 5, 2019, Olosunde signed a two-year contract with Rotherham United. He scored his first goal for the club, and his first professional goal, in an FA Cup tie against Everton on January 9, 2021. On June 7, 2021, it was announced that he would leave the club as a free agent at the end of the month, having turned down a new contract offer.

=== Preston North End ===
On June 30, 2021, it was announced that Olosunde had agreed to join Preston North End on a two-year deal. In his first year, Olosunde played in only 2 games after suffering from Achilles tendon and Groin injuries for most of the season.

=== The New Saints ===
On February 16, 2024, Cymru Premier side The New Saints announced the signing of Olosunde on a one-year deal. He left the club at the end of the 2024–25 season.

== International career ==
Olosunde has played for the United States at several youth levels. For the United States under-17, he played 22 matches and was part of the 21-player roster that represented United States at the 2015 FIFA U-17 World Cup in Chile. He only appeared in the team's first match against Nigeria. Due to his heritage, he is also eligible to represent Nigeria at the international level.

He made his senior debut for the United States on May 28, 2018, coming on as a 74th-minute substitute against Bolivia.

== Career statistics ==
As of August 23, 2022

Appearances and goals by club, season and competition
Club	Season	League			FA Cup		League Cup		Other		Total	
Club	Season	Division	Apps	Goals	Apps	Goals	Apps	Goals	Apps	Goals	Apps	Goals
Rotherham United	2019–20	League One	32	0	3	0	2	0	2 (Note: Appearance(s) in EFL Trophy.)	0	39	0
Rotherham United	2020–21	Championship	32	0	1	1	0	0	0	0	33	1
Rotherham United	Total		64	0	4	1	2	0	2	0	72	1
Preston North End	2021–22	Championship	2	0	0	0	0	0	0	0	2	0
Preston North End	2022–23	Championship	0	0	0	0	1	0	0	0	1	0
Preston North End	Total		2	0	0	0	1	0	0	0	3	0
Total			66	0	4	1	3	0	2	0	75	1
