= Clark Robertson =

Scottish footballer (born 1993)

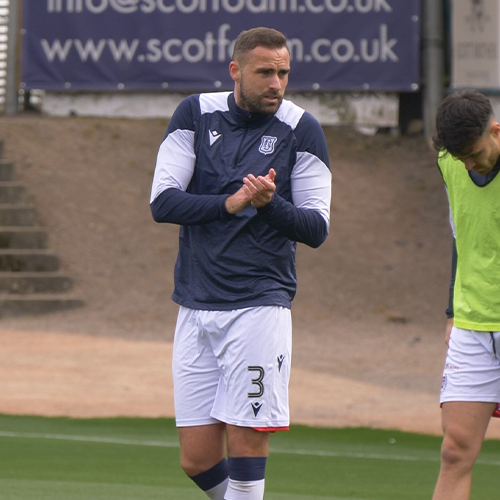
- Robertson during a Dundee warm-up in 2024

Personal information
- Full name: Clark Robertson
- Date of birth: 5 September 1993 (age 33)
- Place of birth: Aberdeen, Scotland
- Position: Centre-back

Team information
- Current team: DPMM
- Number: 6

Senior career*
Years	Team	Apps	(Gls)
2009–2015	Aberdeen	57	(0)
2015–2018	Blackpool	121	(4)
2018–2021	Rotherham United	61	(5)
2021–2023	Portsmouth	49	(2)
2023–2024	F.C. Ashdod	19	(2)
2024–2026	Dundee	36	(2)
2026–	DPMM	5	(0)

International career
2010–2011	Scotland U19	4	(0)
2012–2014	Scotland U21	10	(0)
- * Club domestic league appearances and goals as of 20 November 2026

Clark Robertson (born 5 September 1993) is a Scottish professional footballer who plays as a centre-back for Bruneian club DPMM FC of the Malaysia Super League.

== Career ==
He signed a full-time contract with Aberdeen in June 2009, and made his debut for the club in a 3–1 defeat to Hamilton Academical on 1 May 2010.

Robertson was selected for the Scotland national under-21 football team in April 2012, but was forced to withdraw due to a knee injury.

In May 2012, Robertson signed a new three-year deal with Aberdeen, tying him to the club until 2015. He was released by Aberdeen in June 2015 and subsequently signed for Blackpool.

In July 2018, Robertson signed a three-year deal with Championship side Rotherham United. He scored his first Rotherham United goal on 27 November 2018, in a 2–2 home draw against Queens Park Rangers. On 17 May 2021, Rotherham United published their retained list, and confirmed Robertson would be leaving the club at the end of his contract.

On 22 June 2021, it was announced that Robertson had signed a two-year contract with Portsmouth, and would join them on 1 July. He would suffer an injury in September that ended in December but didn't play a game back until January. He went on to score his first goal for the club against former team Rotherham United in a 3-0 Pompey win.

Robertson left Portsmouth at the end of the 2022–23 season and then signed for Israeli club F.C. Ashdod. He left the country in October 2023, along with the club's other foreign players, following the start of the Gaza war.

On 21 June 2024, Robertson returned to Scotland and joined Scottish Premiership club Dundee on a two-year deal. In his first game with the Dark Blues, a friendly against Arbroath, Robertson suffered a hamstring injury which would keep him out for the first part of the season. Robertson made his return to the first team on 28 September, making his first appearance and start for Dundee in a league game at home to his former youth club, Aberdeen. Robertson scored his first goal for the Dee on 8 February 2025 in a Scottish Cup fifth round victory over Airdrieonians.

On 22 July 2025, Robertson scored in his first appearance of the season for the Dee in an away League Cup win over Bonnyrigg Rose, and made it two in two on 26 July in a home win over Montrose. His next goal came on 19 October in a 2-0 win over Celtic in Dundee's first home win over the reigning champions since 1988.

On 11 July 2026, Robertson moved to Southeast Asia after the conclusion of his contract with Dundee, linking up with Brunei royalty-owned DPMM FC that play in the Malaysia Super League. He made his debut on 23 August in a 0–1 away victory to Penang.

== Personal life ==
In October 2024, Robertson reportedly began dating radio personality and former Love Island contestant Laura Anderson. They split in March 2026 after 18 months together. Though social media posts on Laura Anderson's Instagram in November 2026, suggest they have reunited.

== Career statistics ==
As of matches played 20 November 2026

Appearances and goals by club, season and competition
Club	Season	League			National Cup		League Cup		Other		Total	
Club	Season	Division	Apps	Goals	Apps	Goals	Apps	Goals	Apps	Goals	Apps	Goals
Aberdeen	2009–10	Scottish Premier League	3	0	0	0	0	0	0	0	3	0
Aberdeen	2010–11	Scottish Premier League	13	0	0	0	1	0	0	0	14	0
Aberdeen	2011–12	Scottish Premier League	9	0	3	0	0	0	0	0	12	0
Aberdeen	2012–13	Scottish Premier League	23	0	2	0	2	0	0	0	27	0
Aberdeen	2013–14	Scottish Premiership	8	0	0	0	3	0	0	0	11	0
Aberdeen	2014–15	Scottish Premiership	1	0	0	0	0	0	0	0	1	0
Aberdeen	Total		57	0	5	0	6	0	0	0	68	0
Blackpool	2015–16	League One	38	1	1	0	1	0	1 (Note: Appearance in Football League Trophy)	1	41	2
Blackpool	2016–17	League Two	44	0	5	0	2	0	5 (Note: Two appearances in EFL Trophy and three in League Two play-offs)	0	56	0
Blackpool	2017–18	League One	39	3	0	0	0	0	1	0	40	3
Blackpool	Total		121	4	6	0	3	0	7	1	137	5
Rotherham United	2018–19	Championship	28	3	1	0	2	0	0	0	31	3
Rotherham United	2019–20	League One	17	2	1	0	2	0	2 (Note: Appearances in 2019–20 EFL Trophy.)	0	22	2
Rotherham United	2020–21	Championship	16	0	0	0	0	0	0	0	16	0
Rotherham United	Total		61	5	2	0	4	0	2	0	69	5
Portsmouth	2021–22	League One	26	2	0	0	1	0	1	0	28	2
Portsmouth	2022–23	League One	23	0	2	0	1	0	3	1	29	1
Portsmouth	Total		49	2	2	0	2	0	4	1	57	3
Ashdod	2023–24	Israeli Premier League	19	2	0	0	0	0	0	0	19	2
Dundee	2024–25	Scottish Premiership	21	0	2	1	0	0	0	0	23	1
Dundee	2025–26	Scottish Premiership	15	2	1	0	2	2	0	0	18	4
Dundee	Total		36	2	3	1	2	2	0	0	41	5
DPMM	2026–27	Malaysia Super League	5	0	5	0	0	0	–		10	0
Career total			348	15	23	1	17	2	13	2	401	20

== Honours ==
Blackpool

- EFL League Two play-offs: 2017
