= Ben Wiles =

English footballer (born 1999)

Personal information
- Full name: Benjamin Jack Wiles
- Date of birth: 17 April 1999 (age 27)
- Place of birth: Rotherham, England
- Height: 5 ft 8 in (1.72 m)
- Position: Midfielder

Team information
- Current team: Milton Keynes Dons
- Number: 26

Youth career
- –2017: Rotherham United

Senior career*
Years	Team	Apps	(Gls)
2017–2023	Rotherham United	172	(15)
2017	→ Frickley Athletic (loan)	3	(0)
2023–2026	Huddersfield Town	97	(11)
2026–	Milton Keynes Dons	23	(4)
- * Club domestic league appearances and goals as of 23 August 2026 (UTC)

Benjamin Jack Wiles (born 17 April 1999) is an English professional footballer who plays as a midfielder for EFL League One club Milton Keynes Dons.

== Early life ==
Wiles was born in Rawmarsh, Rotherham, South Yorkshire and attended Kilnhurst Primary School and later Rawmarsh Community School.

== Club career ==
=== Rotherham United ===
Wiles began his career at Rotherham United, progressing through the club's youth academy before signing a one-year professional contract on 1 June 2017. He joined Northern Premier League Division One South club Frickley Athletic on 10 August 2017 on a one-month youth loan, where he made five appearances. Upon returning, he made his first-team debut for Rotherham on 3 October in a 2–1 loss at home to Chesterfield in the EFL Trophy.

Wiles scored his first professional goal on 31 August 2019 in the League One game against Tranmere Rovers.

=== Huddersfield Town ===
On 25 August 2023, Wiles signed for fellow EFL Championship side Huddersfield Town for a "significant" undisclosed fee, on a three-year deal.

=== Milton Keynes Dons ===
On 8 January 2026, Wiles signed for League Two club Milton Keynes Dons for an undisclosed fee. He made his league debut on 17 January 2026, scoring the first goal in a 2–0 away win over Accrington Stanley. Wiles featured heavily in the second half of the season, with the club achieving a second-placed finish and promotion back to League One.

== Personal life ==
His grandfather is the former Scotland and Sheffield United defender Eddie Colquhoun.

== Career statistics ==
As of 8 August 2026

Appearances and goals by club, season and competition
Club	Season	League			FA Cup		EFL Cup		Other		Total	
Club	Season	Division	Apps	Goals	Apps	Goals	Apps	Goals	Apps	Goals	Apps	Goals
Rotherham United	2017–18	League One	0	0	—		0	0	2 (Note: Appearances in EFL Trophy)	0	2	0
Rotherham United	2018–19	Championship	20	0	1	0	2	0	—		23	0
Rotherham United	2019–20	League One	33	3	3	0	2	0	2	0	40	3
Rotherham United	2020–21	Championship	44	2	1	0	0	0	—		45	2
Rotherham United	2021–22	League One	46	8	2	1	1	0	4	1	53	10
Rotherham United	2022–23	Championship	27	2	0	0	0	0	0	0	27	2
Rotherham United	2023–24	Championship	2	0	0	0	1	0	0	0	3	0
Rotherham United	Total		172	15	7	1	6	0	8	1	193	17
Frickley Athletic (loan)	2017–18	Northern Premier D1S	3	0	2	0	—		—		5	0
Huddersfield Town	2023–24	Championship	30	0	1	0	0	0	—		31	0
Huddersfield Town	2024–25	League One	45	8	1	0	2	0	3	1	51	9
Huddersfield Town	2025–26	League One	22	3	1	0	3	0	2	0	28	3
Huddersfield Town	Total		97	11	3	0	5	0	5	1	110	12
Milton Keynes Dons	2025–26	League Two	21	4	1	0	—		—		22	4
Milton Keynes Dons	2026–27	League One	0	0	0	0	1	0	0	0	1	0
Milton Keynes Dons	Total		21	4	1	0	1	0	0	0	23	4
Career total			293	29	13	1	12	0	13	2	331	32

== Honours ==
Rotherham United

- League One runner-up: 2021–22
- EFL Trophy: 2021–22

Milton Keynes Dons

- EFL League Two runner-up: 2025–26

Individual

- Rotherham United Young Player of the Season: 2019–20
