= Akeem Hinds =

English footballer (born 1999)

Personal information
- Full name: Akeem Antony Hinds
- Date of birth: 26 November 1999 (age 26)
- Place of birth: Sheffield, England
- Height: 6 ft 0 in (1.84 m)
- Position: Left-back

Team information
- Current team: Sheffield

Youth career
- –2017: Rotherham United

Senior career*
| Years | Team | Apps | (Gls) |
| 2017–2020 | Rotherham United | 0 | (0) |
| 2018 | → Frickley Athletic (loan) | 5 | (1) |
| 2019 | → Hyde United (loan) | 4 | (0) |
| 2019 | → Bradford (Park Avenue) (loan) | 4 | (0) |
| 2020 | Lincoln City | 0 | (0) |
| 2020–2021 | Brackley Town | 2 | (0) |
| 2021–2022 | Buxton | 22 | (0) |
| 2022 | Bradford (Park Avenue) | 18 | (0) |
| 2022 | Matlock Town | 7 | (0) |
| 2022–2023 | Stafford Rangers | 3 | (0) |
| 2023–2025 | Aberystwyth Town | 16 | (0) |
| 2024–2025 | Brighouse Town | 13 | (0) |
| 2025– | Sheffield | 0 | (0) |
- * Club domestic league appearances and goals as of 29 June 2025

Akeem Antony Hinds (born 26 November 1999) is an English footballer who plays as a left-back for United Counties League Premier Division North club Sheffield.

== Career ==
Hinds was born in Sheffield and joined Sheffield United Academy as a 13-year-old. Hinds then switched to Rotherham United Rotherham United. at the age of 15 He made his professional debut in October 2017 in the EFL Trophy defeat to Chesterfield. In June 2018 he signed his first professional contract, a one-year deal following the conclusion of his scholarship.

=== Loans ===
On 18 September 2018, he joined Northern Premier League Division One East side Frickley Athletic on a one-month youth loan. In March 2019, he was sent out on loan again to NPL Premier Division side Hyde United on a one-month loan deal. In May 2019, he signed a new one-year contract extension until 2020. In August 2019 he joined Bradford (Park Avenue) on loan until January 2020, but was recalled at the end of the month. In January 2020 he had his Rotherham United contract terminated by mutual consent and left the club.

=== Lincoln City ===
Shortly after, Hinds signed for Lincoln City until the end of the 2020 season. On 28 May 2020, it was announced Hinds will leave the club at the end of his current contract.

=== Brackley Town ===
Following his release from Lincoln City at the end of the 2019-2020 season, Hinds signed for National League North side Brackley Town on 27 November 2020.

=== Buxton ===
He signed for Northern Premier League Premier Division side Buxton on a free transfer in August 2021.

=== Return to Bradford ===
Hinds only had a brief spell at Buxton, but helped the club challenge at the top of the league and also contributed to their FA Cup run to the second round proper before he signed for Bradford (Park Avenue) on 7 January 2022, penning a short-term contract.

=== Later career ===
In October 2022, Hinds returned to the Northern Premier League to join Matlock Town. Having struggled to secure a first-team place, he signed for Stafford Rangers in December of the same year.

Akeem signed for Aberystwyth Town in the Cymru Premier League for the 2023/24 season.

In June 2025, Hinds joined Sheffield following their relegation to the Northern Counties East Premier Division.

== Career statistics ==
=== Club ===
As of end of 2024–25 season

Appearances and goals by club, season and competition
| Club | Season | League | | | National Cup | | League Cup | | Other | | Total | |
| Club | Season | Division | Apps | Goals | Apps | Goals | Apps | Goals | Apps | Goals | Apps | Goals |
|---|---|---|---|---|---|---|---|---|---|---|---|---|
| Rotherham United | 2017–18 | League One | 0 | 0 | 0 | 0 | 0 | 0 | 2 (Note: Appearances in 2017–18 EFL Trophy.) | 0 | 2 | 0 |
| Rotherham United | 2018–19 | Championship | 0 | 0 | — | | 0 | 0 | — | | 0 | 0 |
| Rotherham United | 2019–20 | League One | 0 | 0 | 0 | 0 | 0 | 0 | 2 (Note: Appearance(s) in 2019–20 EFL Trophy.) | 0 | 2 | 0 |
| Rotherham United | Total | | 0 | 0 | 0 | 0 | 0 | 0 | 4 | 0 | 4 | 0 |
| Frickley Athletic (loan) | 2018–19 | NPL Division One East | 3 | 0 | 1 | 0 | — | | — | | 4 | 0 |
| Hyde United (loan) | 2018–19 | NPL Division One Premier | 4 | 0 | — | | — | | — | | 4 | 0 |
| Bradford (Park Avenue) (loan) | 2019–20 | National League North | 4 | 0 | — | | — | | — | | 4 | 0 |
| Lincoln City | 2019–20 | League One | 0 | 0 | 0 | 0 | 0 | 0 | — | | 0 | 0 |
| Brackley Town | 2020–21 | National League North | 2 | 0 | 0 | 0 | — | | 2 (Note: Appearances in FA Trophy.) | 0 | 4 | 0 |
| Buxton | 2021–22 | NPL Premier Division | 22 | 0 | 8 | 0 | — | | 1 | 0 | 31 | 0 |
| Bradford (Park Avenue) | 2021–22 | National League North | 18 | 0 | — | | — | | — | | 18 | 0 |
| Matlock Town | 2022–23 | NPL Premier Division | 7 | 0 | 0 | 0 | — | | 2 | 0 | 9 | 0 |
| Stafford Rangers | 2022–23 | NPL Premier Division | 3 | 0 | 0 | 0 | — | | 0 | 0 | 3 | 0 |
| Aberystwyth Town | 2023–24 | Cymru Premier | 13 | 0 | 2 | 0 | 2 | 0 | — | | 17 | 0 |
| Brighouse Town | 2024–25 | NPL Division One East | 13 | 0 | 0 | 0 | — | | 0 | 0 | 13 | 0 |
| Career total | | | 89 | 0 | 11 | 0 | 2 | 0 | 9 | 0 | 111 | 0 |
