= Billy Jones (footballer, born 1987) =

English footballer

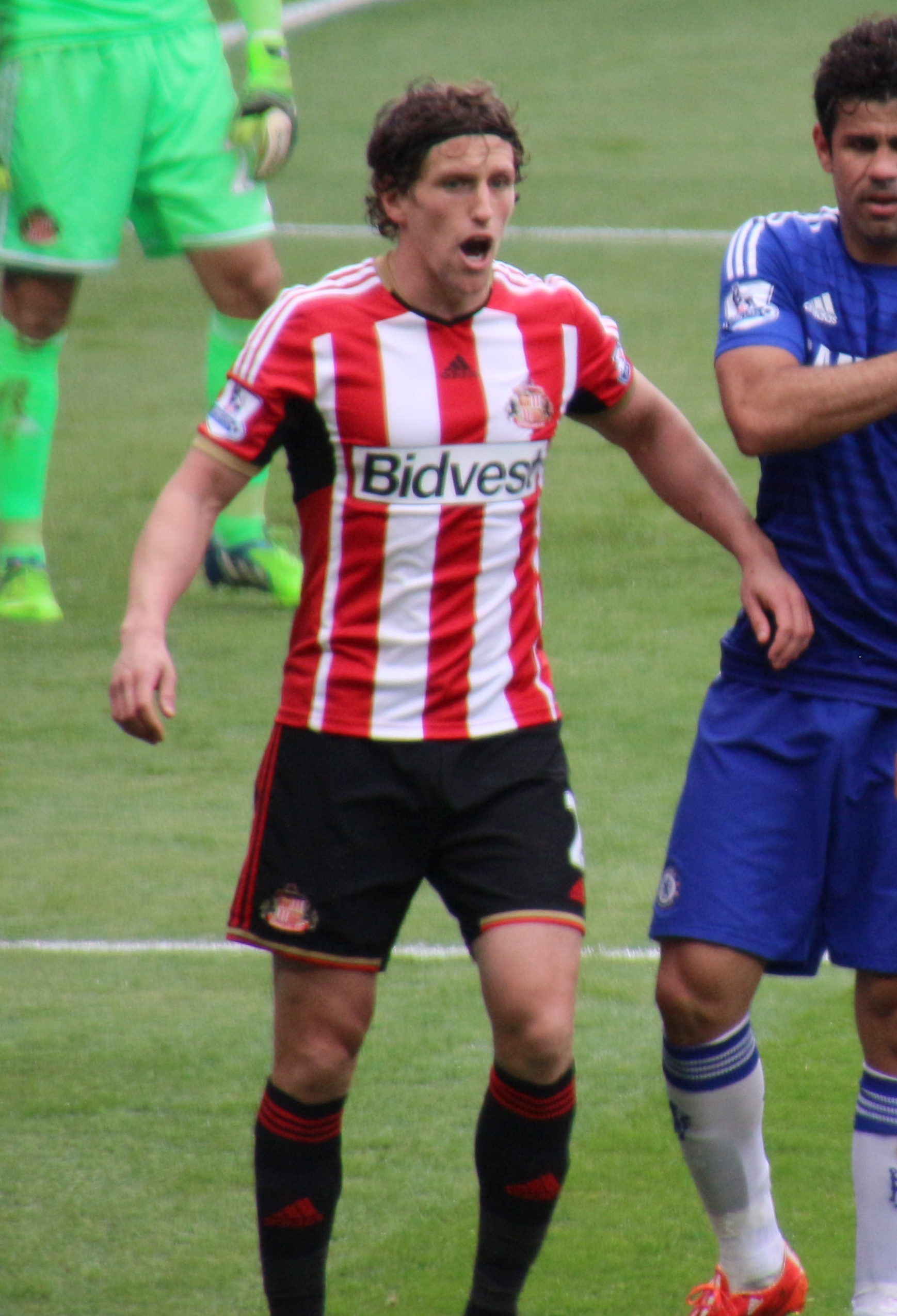
- Jones playing for Sunderland in 2015

Personal information
- Full name: Billy Jones
- Date of birth: 24 March 1987 (age 39)
- Place of birth: Shrewsbury, England
- Height: 6 ft 0 in (1.83 m)
- Position: Right-back

Youth career
- –2003: Crewe Alexandra

Senior career*
| Years | Team | Apps | (Gls) |
| 2003–2007 | Crewe Alexandra | 132 | (8) |
| 2007–2011 | Preston North End | 160 | (13) |
| 2011–2014 | West Bromwich Albion | 66 | (1) |
| 2014–2018 | Sunderland | 87 | (3) |
| 2018–2021 | Rotherham United | 36 | (0) |
| 2021 | → Crewe Alexandra (loan) | 3 | (0) |
| Total | | 484 | (25) |

International career
| 2002–2003 | England U16 | 12 | (0) |
| 2003–2004 | England U17 | 5 | (0) |
| 2004–2006 | England U19 | 7 | (0) |
| 2006–2007 | England U20 | 1 | (0) |
- * Club domestic league appearances and goals

Billy Jones (born 24 March 1987) is an English former professional footballer who played as a right-back.

Jones started his career at Crewe Alexandra and made his professional debut in October 2003 in a 3–0 win over Derby County. After four season playing in Crewe's back-line and midfield, he moved to Preston North End in 2007, and in 2011 made his first Premier League appearance with West Bromwich Albion.

== Club career ==
=== Crewe Alexandra ===
Born in Shrewsbury, Shropshire, and educated at Belvidere School, Jones joined Crewe as a trainee following a recommendation to then manager Dario Gradi from former Crewe centre half Dave Walton. Jones worked his way through the Crewe Academy ranks, and in 2003 signed his first professional contract for the club.

The English defender made his debut for the club aged 16 against Derby County on 18 October 2003, coming on as an 89th-minute substitute for Justin Cochrane. Jones went on to play a further 26 league games, which also included his first goal for the club against Wigan Athletic (on 20 December 2003), which later won Crewe's Goal of the Season award. Jones also won Crewe's Young Player of the Year award.

Jones played 20 league and two League Cup games during the 2004–05 season, but cemented his place as a first-team regular in the 2005–06 season, making 46 appearances and scoring seven goals as Crewe were relegated from the Football League Championship. Jones played in central midfield for most of the season before moving to a left-back role following the signing of midfielder Tony Grant during the January transfer window. His goal tally made him the club's top goalscorer, and he later won Crewe's Player of the Year award.

Jones was joined by more experienced defenders for the 2006–07 season: ex-Aston Villa player Neil Cox and former Notts County centre-half Julien Baudet. Jones played his 100th league game for the club ten games into the season against Millwall. In October 2006, Jones rejected an extension to his Crewe contract, and a week later, Crewe put Jones on the transfer list. Several clubs were linked with a move for the young defender, most notably Premiership club Manchester City, who were, according to the Daily Mirror, lining up a £1.5 million offer for him.

While Jones was later joined by Jon Otsemobor and Luke Rodgers on the Crewe transfer list, he was in a different position because of his age. Crewe manager Dario Gradi said that he would take a chance on a tribunal, meaning that Jones would stay at Crewe until the end of his contract and the club would still get a fee for his transfer. Before the end of a season in which Jones made 47 appearances, scoring once, Crewe rejected offers from Stoke City and Everton for the 20-year-old defender.

=== Preston North End ===
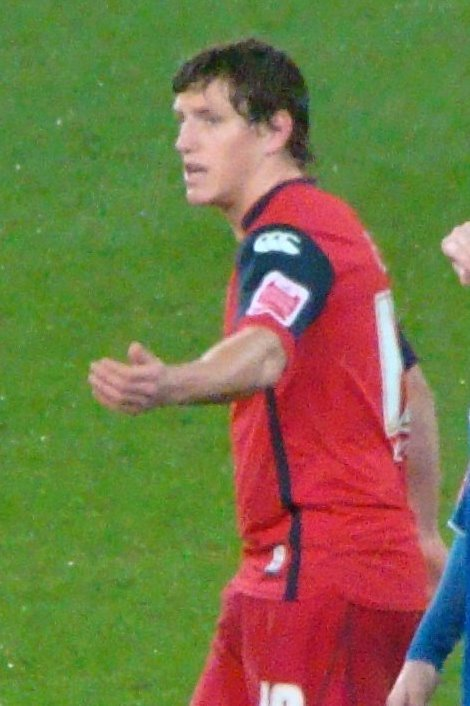
Jones playing for Preston North End in 2009

On 11 June 2007, after much deliberation over which Football League Championship side he was going to join after leaving Crewe, Jones joined Preston North End on a four-year contract.

On 24 August 2007, the Football League tribunal considered Jones's transfer from Crewe to Preston and decided Preston had to pay Crewe an additional £50,000 on top of the original £200,000 transfer fee, making the first payment £250,000 overall. Additional clauses were also introduced, with Preston to pay Crewe £200,000 at the start of the 2008–09 season, and £62,500 when Jones reached his 15th, 30th, 45th and 60th first team appearances. The Lancashire club would also have to pay Crewe another £250,000 if The Lilywhites were promoted to the Premier League, if Jones was still at the club, and, if Preston were to sell Jones, 20% of the transfer fee would to paid to Crewe. Overall, if all the criteria were fulfilled, Preston would have to pay Crewe at least £1 million. Ultimately, however, Preston were not promoted, and Jones eventually left Preston on a free transfer.

After the sale of Graham Alexander to Burnley, Jones became Preston's first choice right-back, but also played occasionally in midfield roles. On 22 February 2011, as Preston fought to avoid relegation, Jones headed in a 96th-minute equaliser against Nottingham Forest to rescue a point at the City Ground. He was also appointed club captain, succeeding Sean St Ledger. With around 10 games of the season yet to be played and the 'Lilywhites' more than 10 points from safety, Jones announced that he would not sign a new contract if Preston failed to remain in the Championship. Despite a short surge towards the end of the season, Preston North End were relegated after a 1–0 home defeat to Cardiff City, with a further 2 games still remaining. Jones was awarded with the Player of the Year for 2010–11 before his final game at Deepdale, mainly because he had been played out of position for a lot of games, due to Preston's lack of choice at the Left-Back Position. Jones captained Preston in their final game of the 2010–11 season: a 3–1 home victory against Watford.

=== West Bromwich Albion ===
On 3 June 2011, Jones joined Premier League side West Bromwich Albion on a free transfer, having agreed a three-year contract.

Jones made 17 Premier League appearances in his debut top-flight season. The former Preston full-back provided cover for Steven Reid, who was ruled out for the season, after picking up an ankle injury against Chelsea in March 2012.

Jones was involved in six of Albion's ten Premier League clean sheets in his first season, including a 0–0 draw with future champions Manchester City on Boxing Day and a historic 1–0 triumph at Liverpool in April 2012.

Jones scored his first goal for West Brom in a 1–1 draw against Newcastle United on 20 April 2013.

=== Sunderland ===
On 28 May 2014, Jones joined Sunderland on a free transfer after he rejected a new contract at West Bromwich Albion. He said "I'm really happy to be here and I'm looking forward to getting back for pre-season and kicking on, I've played at the Stadium of Light a number of times so I know what great backing the club has. I knew I was signing for a massive club with everything in place to kick on up the league and carry on moving forward". Jones scored his first goal for Sunderland on 25 October 2015 in the derby match against Newcastle.

At the end of the 2017–18 season, following Sunderland's relegation, he was released by the club.

=== Rotherham United ===
Jones signed for Rotherham United on a two-year deal on 20 July 2018. In July 2020, he signed a new one-year contract extension.

=== Return to Crewe ===
With only six months left on his contract, Jones rejoined Crewe Alexandra on loan on 21 January 2021. On 17 May 2021, Rotherham United published their retained list, and confirmed Jones would be leaving the club at the end of his contract.

== International career ==
While Jones was playing for the Crewe youth team, he played in England's youth set-up as well. The defender has captained all levels up to Under-20 level.

== Career statistics ==
As of 17 May 2021

| Club | Season | League | | | FA Cup | | League Cup | | Other | | Total | |
| Club | Season | Division | Apps | Goals | Apps | Goals | Apps | Goals | Apps | Goals | Apps | Goals |
|---|---|---|---|---|---|---|---|---|---|---|---|---|
| Crewe Alexandra | 2003–04 | Championship | 27 | 1 | 1 | 0 | 0 | 0 | – | | 28 | 1 |
| Crewe Alexandra | 2004–05 | Championship | 20 | 0 | 0 | 0 | 2 | 0 | – | | 22 | 0 |
| Crewe Alexandra | 2005–06 | Championship | 44 | 6 | 1 | 1 | 1 | 0 | – | | 46 | 7 |
| Crewe Alexandra | 2006–07 | League One | 41 | 1 | 0 | 0 | 2 | 0 | 4 (Note: Appearances in Football League Trophy) | 0 | 47 | 1 |
| Crewe Alexandra | Total | | 132 | 8 | 2 | 1 | 5 | 0 | 4 | 0 | 143 | 9 |
| Preston North End | 2007–08 | Championship | 29 | 0 | 1 | 0 | 1 | 0 | – | | 31 | 0 |
| Preston North End | 2008–09 | Championship | 44 | 3 | 1 | 0 | 2 | 0 | 2 (Note: Appearances in Championship play-offs) | 0 | 49 | 3 |
| Preston North End | 2009–10 | Championship | 44 | 4 | 1 | 0 | 2 | 0 | – | | 47 | 4 |
| Preston North End | 2010–11 | Championship | 43 | 6 | 1 | 0 | 2 | 0 | – | | 46 | 6 |
| Preston North End | Total | | 160 | 13 | 4 | 0 | 7 | 0 | 2 | 0 | 173 | 13 |
| West Bromwich Albion | 2011–12 | Premier League | 18 | 0 | 1 | 0 | 2 | 0 | – | | 21 | 0 |
| West Bromwich Albion | 2012–13 | Premier League | 27 | 1 | 2 | 0 | 2 | 0 | – | | 31 | 1 |
| West Bromwich Albion | 2013–14 | Premier League | 21 | 0 | 0 | 0 | 1 | 0 | – | | 22 | 0 |
| West Bromwich Albion | Total | | 66 | 1 | 3 | 0 | 5 | 0 | – | | 74 | 1 |
| Sunderland | 2014–15 | Premier League | 14 | 0 | 2 | 0 | 2 | 0 | – | | 18 | 0 |
| Sunderland | 2015–16 | Premier League | 25 | 1 | 0 | 0 | 0 | 0 | – | | 25 | 1 |
| Sunderland | 2016–17 | Premier League | 20 | 1 | 0 | 0 | 1 | 0 | – | | 21 | 1 |
| Sunderland | 2017–18 | Championship | 22 | 1 | 0 | 0 | 0 | 0 | – | | 22 | 1 |
| Sunderland | Total | | 81 | 3 | 2 | 0 | 3 | 0 | – | | 86 | 3 |
| Rotherham United | 2018–19 | Championship | 21 | 0 | 0 | 0 | 1 | 0 | – | | 22 | 0 |
| Rotherham United | 2019–20 | League One | 10 | 0 | 1 | 0 | 0 | 0 | 1 (Note: Appearance in EFL Trophy) | 0 | 12 | 0 |
| Rotherham United | 2020–21 | Championship | 5 | 0 | 1 | 0 | 1 | 0 | – | | 7 | 0 |
| Rotherham United | Total | | 36 | 0 | 2 | 0 | 2 | 0 | 1 | 0 | 41 | 0 |
| Crewe Alexandra (loan) | 2020–21 | League One | 3 | 0 | 0 | 0 | 0 | 0 | 0 | 0 | 3 | 0 |
| Career Total | | | 458 | 25 | 13 | 1 | 22 | 0 | 7 | 0 | 519 | 26 |
