= Matt Crooks =

English footballer (born 1994)

- Crooks in 2026

Personal information
- Full name: Matt Davidson Rider Crooks
- Date of birth: 20 January 1994 (age 32)
- Place of birth: Leeds, England
- Position: Midfielder

Team information
- Current team: Hull City
- Number: 25

Youth career
- 2002–2009: Manchester United
- 2009–2012: Huddersfield Town

Senior career*
Years	Team	Apps	(Gls)
2010–2015	Huddersfield Town	1	(0)
2012	→ FC Halifax Town (loan)	10	(1)
2012–2013	→ Radcliffe Borough (loan)		
2014	→ Hartlepool United (loan)	3	(0)
2014–2015	→ Accrington Stanley (loan)	6	(0)
2015–2016	Accrington Stanley	42	(6)
2016–2017	Rangers	2	(0)
2017	→ Scunthorpe United (loan)	12	(3)
2017–2019	Northampton Town	51	(9)
2019–2021	Rotherham United	89	(18)
2021–2024	Middlesbrough	102	(20)
2024–2025	Real Salt Lake	31	(3)
2025–	Hull City	50	(7)
- * Club domestic league appearances and goals as of 21:25, 22 August 2026 (UTC)

Matt Davidson Rider Crooks (born 20 January 1994) is an English professional footballer who plays as a midfielder for Premier League club Hull City.

== Career ==
=== Huddersfield Town ===
He first joined Huddersfield Town academy in 2009, after a spell at the Manchester United Academy and signed his first professional contract at the club.

In October 2010, he travelled with the Town squad for their League One match against Plymouth Argyle, and a few days later, he was named on the bench in their FA Cup match against Cambridge United. Ahead of the 2011–12 season, Crooks was among other youth players to be expected to be loaned out to gain first team experience. Nevertheless, in November, Crooks signed his first professional contract with the club, until 2014. It was announced on 9 February 2012 that Crooks was nominated for League One Apprentice of the Year, however, he ultimately lost it out to Charlton Athletic's Jordan Cousins.

In March 2012, it announced that Crooks would be joining FC Halifax Town on a one-month loan. While at Halifax, Crooks scored his first professional goal in a 4–0 win over Histon. That soon earned him a loan extension until the end of the season. Crooks was even allowed to play for the club's promotion push. For the following season, 2012–13, Crooks was given number 36 shirt, however, he failed to make an appearance for the first-team. On 7 December 2012, Crooks, along with James Burke, joined Radcliffe Borough on loan until mid-January. Crooks made an impressive display at the club, including when he scored a brace against Clitheroe. Two days later, Crooks made his return to Huddersfield Town.

After returning to Huddersfield Town, Crooks remained playing in the club's reserve. However, Crooks sustained an ankle injury during a development match in early October. Following a surgery, it was announced that Crooks would be on the sideline for two months. Following his return in mid-February, Crooks was praised for his return from injury and playing as a central defence. At the end of the 2013–14 season, Crooks was offered a new contract by the club.

Ahead of the 2014–15 season, Crooks switched number shirt from thirty-six to twenty-two after Ed Wilczynski took over Crooks's first number and made an impressive display as a centre back in the pre-season friendly that convinced Mark Robins to use him. After years playing at the reserve and be loaned out twice at the time, Crooks finally made his first team début at centre back for the Terriers in the 4–0 defeat by AFC Bournemouth on 9 August 2014 in the opening game of the season. The loss, however, was to be Robins's last game as a manager of Huddersfield Town, as he was sacked the next day Newspaper Huddersfield Daily Examiner urged the club's supporters to give Crooks time to make up his mistake after receiving criticism during the match, including the first goal.

He did not make another appearance for Huddersfield that season and joined Hartlepool United on a month's emergency loan on 21 October 2014 as defensive cover. After making three appearances for the club, it announced that Crooks would make a return to the club following an expiry of a month loan with Hartlepool United. Three days after returning from his loan spell, he was sent on loan to fellow League Two side Accrington Stanley until 3 January. On 2 February 2015, Crooks left Huddersfield Town after having his contract terminated by mutual consent.

=== Accrington Stanley ===
Three weeks later, Crooks returned to Accrington Stanley signing an 18-month contract on 24 February 2015. After a strong start to the 2015–16 season which saw him score an extra time equaliser against Hull City in the Football League Cup and a 90th-minute equaliser against Notts County in League Two, Accrington manager John Coleman tipped Crooks to have a big future in the game.

In January 2016 it was announced that Scottish club Rangers had approached Crooks and teammate Josh Windass with a view to them signing pre-contract agreements. The talks angered the Accrington chairman Andy Holt as Rangers were only required to pay a nominal fee to complete the transfers for both players under FIFA regulations. The following day both players agreed pre-contracts with Rangers to join the club in the summer of 2016.

=== Rangers ===
Crooks officially joined Rangers on 1 July 2016, signing a four-year contract alongside fellow Accrington player Josh Windass. Both players had already been training with the club prior to completing their transfers after Rangers agreed a compensation fee with Accrington, reported to be around £60,000 per player. He missed the start of 2016–17 season due to an ankle ligament injury but returned to playing in an under-20 match against St Mirren in late August. Crooks made his first-team debut against Queen of the South in a Scottish League Cup match, appearing as a 72nd-minute substitute on 20 September 2016. However, Crooks only made a few sporadic appearances for the club thereafter and this led many to criticise then Rangers manager Mark Warburton's transfer policy.

=== Northampton Town ===
Crooks officially joined the English League One side on 18 July 2017 for an undisclosed transfer fee after only three appearances with Rangers FC. On 9 September 2017, Crooks scored his first competitive goal for the Cobblers after 21 seconds of the game against Doncaster Rovers, this was the quickest goal ever scored in a competitive match at Sixfields Stadium.

=== Rotherham United ===
On 11 January 2019, Crooks joined EFL Championship side Rotherham United for an undisclosed fee, signing a three-and-a-half-year contract. Following the Millers relegation to League One, Crooks was part of the side that gained immediate promotion after the season was curtailed early due to the Coronavirus pandemic. His performances during that season earned him a place in the PFA Team of the Year for League One. Crooks was awarded the EFL Championship Player of the Month award for January 2021 after scoring three goals in an impressive month for Rotherham.

=== Middlesbrough ===
On 23 July 2021, Crooks completed a move to EFL Championship side Middlesbrough for an undisclosed fee, signing a three-year contract. He scored his first goal for Middlesbrough in a 2–1 home win against Bristol City on 14 August 2021. Four days later, on 18 August 2021, Crooks scored again during a 3–2 home defeat to QPR. On 25 August 2021, Crooks was shown a straight red card in the 87th minute of a 1–0 league defeat away to Reading. However, the decision was overturned and the red card was rescinded following an appeal from Middlesbrough.

On 15 January 2022, Crooks scored two headed goals, including a stoppage time winner, in a 2–1 home win against Reading. He also scored for Middlesbrough in an FA Cup fourth round tie away at his boyhood club Manchester United, which Boro won on penalties. Crooks left Middlesbrough in February 2024 having made 115 appearances, as well as scoring 23 times for the club.

=== Real Salt Lake ===
On 12 February 2024, Crooks joined MLS side Real Salt Lake for an undisclosed fee on a three-year deal.

=== Hull City ===
On 10 January 2025, Crooks returned to England, signing for Championship side Hull City on a two-and-a-half year deal. He made his debut on 18 January 2025, as an 83rd-minute substitute for Gustavo Puerta in the 1–0 away win against Millwall. On 24 January in his first start he opened the scoring in the 3–0 away win against Sheffield United.

== Personal life ==
Crooks is a Manchester United fan.

Crooks has been diagnosed with epilepsy, the condition first discovered following a seizure when he was 18 years old. Crooks works with the Peter Doody Foundation, a charity which works to normalise epilepsy and free young adults from stigma, limitations and fear - as well as highlighting the dangers of the condition.

Crooks is the Vice Chair and Trustee of The Jordan Sinnott Foundation Trust.

Crooks is the child of deaf adults, and is fluent in British Sign Language.

== Career statistics ==
As of 22 August 2026

Appearances and goals by club, season and competition
Club	Season	League			National cup (Note: Includes FA Cup)		League cup (Note: Includes Scottish League Cup, EFL Cup)		Other		Total	
Club	Season	Division	Apps	Goals	Apps	Goals	Apps	Goals	Apps	Goals	Apps	Goals
Huddersfield Town	2010–11	League One	0	0	0	0	0	0	0	0	0	0
Huddersfield Town	2011–12	League One	0	0	0	0	0	0	0	0	0	0
Huddersfield Town	2012–13	Championship	0	0	0	0	0	0	—		0	0
Huddersfield Town	2013–14	Championship	0	0	0	0	0	0	—		0	0
Huddersfield Town	2014–15	Championship	1	0	—		0	0	—		1	0
Huddersfield Town	Total		1	0	0	0	0	0	0	0	1	0
FC Halifax Town (loan)	2011–12	Conference North	10	1	—		—		0	0	10	1
Hartlepool United (loan)	2014–15	League Two	3	0	0	0	—		—		3	0
Accrington Stanley (loan)	2014–15	League Two	6	0	2	0	—		—		8	0
Accrington Stanley	2014–15	League Two	10	0	—		—		—		10	0
Accrington Stanley	2015–16	League Two	32	6	2	1	1	1	0	0	35	8
Accrington Stanley	Total		48	6	4	1	1	1	0	0	53	8
Rangers	2016–17	Scottish Premiership	2	0	0	0	1	0	—		3	0
Scunthorpe United (loan)	2016–17	League One	12	3	0	0	0	0	0	0	12	3
Northampton Town	2017–18	League One	30	4	1	0	1	0	2 (Note: Appearance(s) in EFL Trophy)	0	34	4
Northampton Town	2018–19	League Two	21	5	0	0	1	0	1	1	23	6
Northampton Town	Total		51	9	1	0	2	0	3	1	57	10
Rotherham United	2018–19	Championship	16	3	0	0	0	0	0	0	16	3
Rotherham United	2019–20	League One	33	9	3	1	2	1	1	0	39	11
Rotherham United	2020–21	Championship	40	6	1	0	1	1	0	0	42	7
Rotherham United	Total		89	18	4	1	3	2	1	0	97	21
Middlesbrough	2021–22	Championship	40	10	4	1	0	0	0	0	44	11
Middlesbrough	2022–23	Championship	37	7	1	0	0	0	2 (Note: Appearances in EFL Championship play-offs)	0	40	7
Middlesbrough	2023–24	Championship	23	3	0	0	4	2	0	0	27	5
Middlesbrough	Total		100	20	5	1	4	2	2	0	111	23
Real Salt Lake	2024	Major League Soccer	31	3	0	0	—		—		31	3
Hull City	2024–25	Championship	18	3	0	0	0	0	0	0	18	3
Hull City	2025–26	Championship	31	4	0	0	1	1	3	0	35	5
Hull City	2026–27	Premier League	1	0	0	0	0	0	0	0	1	0
Hull City	Total		50	7	0	0	1	1	3	0	54	8
Career total			397	67	14	3	12	6	9	1	432	77

== Honours ==
Rotherham United

- EFL League One second-place promotion: 2019–20

Hull City

- EFL Championship play-offs: 2026

Individual

- PFA Team of the Year: 2015–16 League Two, 2019–20 League One
- EFL Championship Player of the Month: January 2021
