= Alex Bray =

British footballer (born 1995)

Personal information
- Full name: Alexander George Bray
- Date of birth: 25 July 1995 (age 31)
- Place of birth: Bath, England
- Height: 5 ft 10 in (1.78 m)
- Position: Winger

Team information
- Current team: Chippenham Town
- Number: 11

Youth career
- Swindon Town
- 2010–2014: Swansea City

Senior career*
Years	Team	Apps	(Gls)
2014–2017	Swansea City	0	(0)
2014	→ Plymouth Argyle (loan)	1	(0)
2017	→ Rotherham United (loan)	2	(0)
2017–2019	Rotherham United	3	(0)
2018	→ Forest Green Rovers (loan)	11	(1)
2018–2019	→ York City (loan)	8	(0)
2019	→ Weston-super-Mare (loan)	10	(3)
2019–2020	Hereford	14	(0)
2020–	Chippenham Town	77	(7)

International career
- Wales U19
- * Club domestic league appearances and goals as of 11:13, 1 June 2023 (UTC)

Alexander George Bray (born 25 July 1995) is a professional footballer who plays for National League South club Chippenham Town.

== Club career ==
=== Swansea City ===
Bray was born in Bath, Somerset. He joined Swansea City's academy at the age of 15 following his release from Swindon Town. He was offered his first professional contract in April 2013 and was included in Swansea City's 2014–15 pre-season squad.

On 1 September 2014, Bray joined League Two club Plymouth Argyle on loan until 10 January 2015. He made his first-team debut on 6 September as a 58th-minute substitute for Jason Banton in a 1–0 win away against Luton Town. Bray had an eventful debut, earning a yellow card and playing a part in Plymouth's goal before suffering an injury after just 11 minutes on the pitch. It was later confirmed that Bray had suffered a ruptured anterior ligament which would require surgery. He returned to Swansea for treatment.

After returning to training in March 2015, Bray was ruled out for a further nine months with injury. Bray signed a one-year contract extension with Swansea in July 2015, keeping him at the club until June 2016.

Bray returned from injury in February 2016, and in March signed a one-year contract extension until June 2017.

=== Rotherham United ===
On 27 January 2017, Bray joined Championship club Rotherham United, initially on loan until 9 June 2017. The loan was made permanent on 10 March 2017 for an undisclosed fee, with Bray signing a contract until the end of the 2018–19 season.

Having failed to make a league appearance for Rotherham since November 2017, Bray joined Forest Green Rovers on loan on 31 January 2018 for the remainder of the 2017–18 season.

Bray joined National League North club York City on 9 November 2018 on loan until 12 January 2019. He made his debut the following day, starting in a 2–1 defeat away to Swindon Town in the FA Cup first round. He returned to Rotherham on 11 January 2019 having made 11 appearances for York, scoring once.

Bray joined National League South club Weston-super-Mare on 12 February 2019 on loan until the end of the 2018–19 season. On return from the loan spell, he was released by Rotherham United at the end of his contract.

=== Hereford ===
On 23 May 2019, Bray signed a one-year deal with Hereford.

=== Chippenham Town ===
On 14 February 2020, Bray signed for Chippenham Town.

== International career ==
Bray has represented Wales at under-19 level.

== Career statistics ==
As of match played 29 April 2023.

Appearances and goals by club, season and competition
Club	Season	League			FA Cup		EFL Cup		Other		Total	
Club	Season	Division	Apps	Goals	Apps	Goals	Apps	Goals	Apps	Goals	Apps	Goals
Swansea City	2014–15	Premier League	0	0	0	0	0	0	—		0	0
Swansea City	2015–16	Premier League	0	0	0	0	0	0	—		0	0
Swansea City	2016–17	Premier League	0	0	0	0	0	0	—		0	0
Swansea City	Total		0	0	0	0	0	0	—		0	0
Plymouth Argyle (loan)	2014–15	League Two	1	0	—		—		—		1	0
Swansea City U23	2016–17	—			—		—		5 (Note: Appearances in EFL Trophy)	0	5	0
Rotherham United	2016–17	Championship	5	0	—		—		—		5	0
Rotherham United	2017–18	League One	0	0	0	0	1	0	3	0	4	0
Rotherham United	2018–19	Championship	0	0	—		0	0	—		0	0
Rotherham United	Total		5	0	0	0	1	0	3	0	9	0
Forest Green Rovers (loan)	2017–18	League Two	11	1	—		—		—		11	1
York City (loan)	2018–19	National League North	8	0	1	0	—		2 (Note: Appearances in FA Trophy)	1	11	1
Weston-super-Mare (loan)	2018–19	National League South	10	3	—		—		—		10	3
Hereford	2019–20	National League North	14	0	0	0	—		—		14	0
Chippenham Town	2019–20	National League South	6	0	—		—		—		6	0
Chippenham Town	2020–21	National League South	11	0	1	0	—		1	0	13	0
Chippenham Town	2021–22	National League South	27	1	0	0	—		0	0	27	1
Chippenham Town	2022–23	National League South	33	6	4	0	—		2	1	39	7
Chippenham Town	Total		77	7	5	0	0	0	3	1	85	8
Career total			126	11	6	0	1	0	13	2	146	13
