= Laurence Bilboe =

English footballer

Personal information
- Full name: Laurence Sidney Bilboe
- Date of birth: 21 February 1998 (age 28)
- Place of birth: Walsall, England
- Height: 6 ft 3 in (1.90 m)
- Position: Goalkeeper

Youth career
- –2016: Rotherham United

Senior career*
Years	Team	Apps	(Gls)
2016–2020	Rotherham United	0	(0)
2016	→ Mickleover Sports (loan)		
2017	→ Sheffield (loan)		
2017–2018	→ Brighouse Town (loan)		
2019	→ Stratford Town (loan)	6	(0)
2019	→ Havant & Waterlooville (loan)	5	(0)
2020–2021	Oldham Athletic	3	(0)
2021	Hemel Hempstead Town	1	(0)
- * Club domestic league appearances and goals as of 22:43, 10 October 2021 (UTC)

Laurence Sidney Bilboe (born 21 February 1998) is an English footballer who plays as a goalkeeper. He started his career at Rotherham United, and had loan spells at Mickleover Sports, Sheffield, Brighouse Town, Stratford Town and Havant & Waterlooville, before being released by Rotherham in 2020. He spent the 2020–21 season with Oldham Athletic and has since played for Hemel Hempstead Town.

== Early life ==
He was born in Walsall.

== Career ==
=== Rotherham United ===
Bilboe started his career at Rotherham United, where he signed a one-year professional contract in March 2016, and joined Mickleover Sports on loan on 2 September 2016, before being recalled later that month due to fellow Rotherham goalkeeper Lewis Price attending the birth of his child. He extended his contract with the club by a year in 2017.

In October 2017, he joined Sheffield on a one-month loan, before joining Brighouse Town on a month-long loan in December 2017. He made his debut for the club later that month in a 5–1 victory to South Shields. He signed a new one-year contract with the club at the end of the season.

In February 2019, he joined Stratford Town on loan. He made six appearances for the club before being recalled in March 2019 to join Havant & Waterlooville on loan. He made his debut for the club on 30 March 2019 against Sutton United, and made 5 appearances for the club in total. He signed a new one-year contract with the club at the end of the season.

He was released by Rotherham United at the end of the 2019–20 season.

=== Oldham Athletic ===
On 16 October 2020, Bilboe joined Oldham Athletic on a one-year contract. He made 3 appearances for the club, but was released at the end of the season.

=== Later career ===
Bilboe made one league appearance for Hemel Hempstead Town in September 2021 before leaving the club later that month.
