= Reece McGinley =

Northern Irish footballer (born 2000)

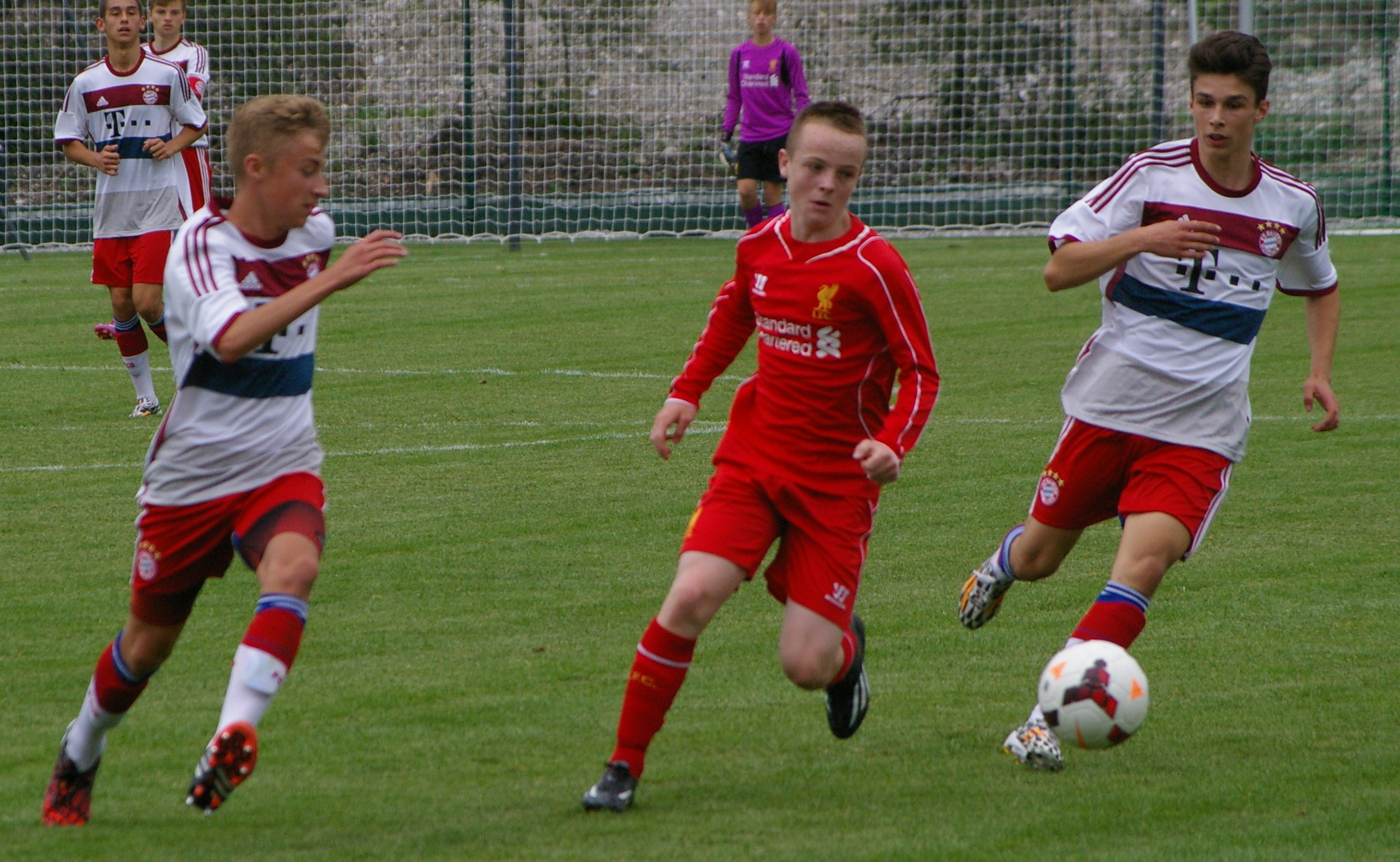
- McGinley playing for Liverpool in 2014.

Personal information
- Date of birth: 1 March 2000 (age 26)
- Place of birth: Northern Ireland
- Position: Midfielder

Senior career*
Years	Team	Apps	(Gls)
2018–2019	Rotherham United	0	(0)
2018	→ Frickley Athletic (loan)	7	(0)
2019	→ Crusaders (loan)	6	(0)
2019–2021	Crusaders	8	(0)
Total		21	(0)

International career
2014–2015	Northern Ireland U15	5	(0)
2015–2016	Northern Ireland U17	6	(2)
2017	Northern Ireland U19	3	(0)
- * Club domestic league appearances and goals as of 09:48, 24 March 2021 (UTC)

Reece McGinley (born 1 March 2000) is a Northern Irish former footballer who last played for NIFL Premiership side Crusaders.

== Career ==
After graduating from the academy, McGinley signed professionally for Rotherham United in April 2018. He had previously made his competitive debut for the club, coming on as a late substitute in a 3–0 win away at Bradford City in the EFL Trophy in November 2017.

On 2 January 2019, McGinley was loaned out to NIFL Premiership side Crusaders FC on a loan deal for the rest of the season.

At the end of the 2018–19 season, McGinley was released by Rotherham United after his contract expired. He returned to Crusaders for the new season, and in December 2019 signed a two-year contract.

McGinley left Crusaders by mutual consent in April 2021, to focus on his personal training business.

== International career ==
He has represented Northern Ireland at under 15s, 17s and 19s level.

== Career statistics ==
Club	Season	League			FA Cup		League Cup		Other		Total	
Club	Season	Division	Apps	Goals	Apps	Goals	Apps	Goals	Apps	Goals	Apps	Goals
Rotherham United	2017–18	EFL League One	0	0	0	0	0	0	1 (Note: Appearances in EFL Trophy)	0	1	0
Rotherham United	2018–19	EFL Championship	0	0	0	0	0	0	—		0	0
Rotherham United	Rotherham Total		0	0	0	0	0	0	1	0	1	0
Frickley Athletic (loan)	2017–18	NPL Premier Division	7	0	—						7	0
Crusaders (loan)	2018–19	NIFL Premiership	6	0	1	0	—		—		7	0
Crusaders	2019–20	NIFL Premiership	5	0	0	0	2	0	—		7	0
Crusaders	2020–21	NIFL Premiership	3	0	0	0	0	0	—		3	0
Crusaders	Crusaders Total		14	0	1	0	2	0	—		17	0
Career Total			21	0	1	0	2	0	1	0	25	0

== Honours ==
Crusaders

- Irish Cup: 2018–19
