= Lewis Price =

Welsh footballer

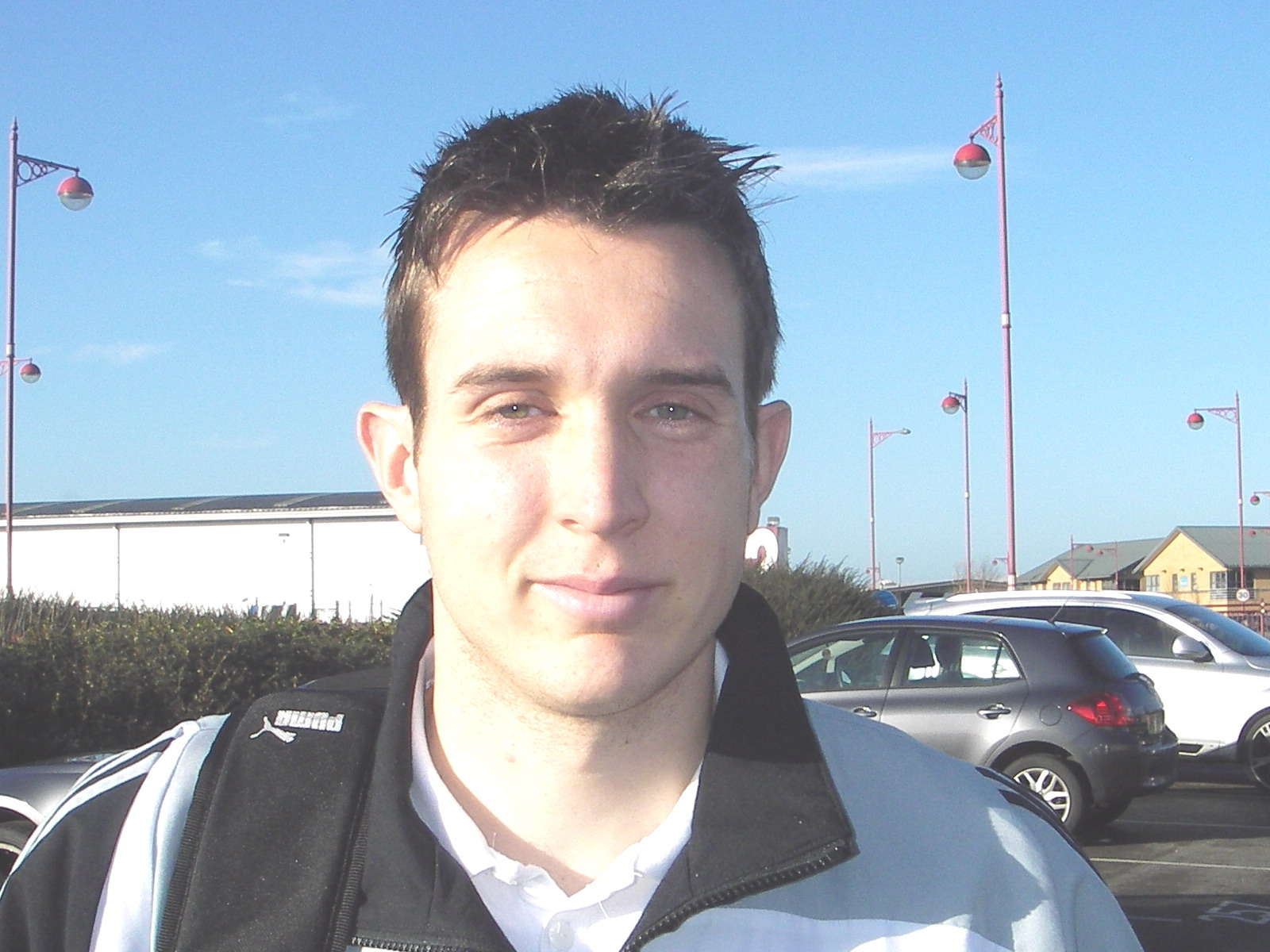

Personal information
- Full name: Lewis Peter Price
- Date of birth: 19 July 1984 (age 42)
- Place of birth: Bournemouth, England
- Height: 6 ft 3 in (1.91 m)
- Position: Goalkeeper

Team information
- Current team: Oxford United (First-Team Goalkeeping Coach)

Youth career
- 2001–2003: Ipswich Town

Senior career*
Years	Team	Apps	(Gls)
2003–2007	Ipswich Town	68	(0)
2004-2005	→ Cambridge United (loan)	6	(0)
2007–2010	Derby County	6	(0)
2008	→ Milton Keynes Dons (loan)	2	(0)
2009	→ Luton Town (loan)	1	(0)
2009–2010	→ Brentford (loan)	13	(0)
2010–2015	Crystal Palace	6	(0)
2013-2014	→ Mansfield Town (loan)	5	(0)
2014–2015	→ Crawley Town (loan)	18	(0)
2015–2016	Sheffield Wednesday	5	(0)
2016–2020	Rotherham United	20	(0)
Total		150	(0)

International career
2002–2003	Wales U19	3	(0)
2004–2006	Wales U21	10	(0)
2005–2012	Wales	11	(0)
- * Club domestic league appearances and goals

Lewis Peter Price (born 19 July 1984) is a retired Welsh international professional footballer who played as a goalkeeper. He is currently the First-Team Goalkeeping Coach for EFL Championship club Oxford United.

Apart from making 6 Premier League appearances for Derby County he spent his whole career in the Football League and made 11 senior appearances for WalesWales

== Club career ==
=== Ipswich Town ===
Price was born in Bournemouth and was an academy player at Southampton but fell out with the goalkeeping coach. He had a trial at Fulham but joined Ipswich Town in October 2001 and graduated through the youth system. He represented Dorset in county matches at under-15 and under-16 levels. He became known for stepping in for Kelvin Davis during the 2004–05 season and saving a penalty against Coventry. After Davies returned from injury, Price played for Cambridge United on loan for part of the season. Davis departed at the end of the 2004–05 season, with Price contesting Shane Supple to be first choice goalkeeper.

He then started nearly every game ahead of first choice keeper Shane Supple. In the 2006–07 season, just a week after Petr Čech and Carlo Cudicini sustained horrific injuries which brought up an argument that goalkeepers need more protection, Price was injured in Ipswich's 3–1 victory over Southend United. Price had to be stretchered off after colliding with Matt Harrold.

Despite playing well for Ipswich when called upon, the arrival of Neil Alexander at Ipswich meant Price's future was destined to be away from Portman Road.

=== Derby County ===
On 27 July 2007, Price joined Premier League club Derby County, for an undisclosed fee on a three-year contract, to provide back-up and competition for then first choice goalkeeper Stephen Bywater.

Price made his debut for Derby against Liverpool on 26 December, after Stephen Bywater was injured in the warm-up and went on to start the next eight league and cup matches before the signing of Roy Carroll ended his run in the first team. In the FA Cup third round replay between Derby and Sheffield Wednesday, Price made two penalty saves helping Derby to victory in a penalty shootout.

Price signed for Milton Keynes Dons on an emergency one-month loan on 27 October 2008, and made his debut the next day in the Dons 2–1 Football League One victory over Leyton Orient. He returned to Derby but, again, could not supplant teammates Stephen Bywater and Roy Carroll from the goalkeepers spot and joined Luton Town on a one-month loan on 2 February 2009. During his time at Luton he played only twice because of a groin injury, but impressed in those two games, helping Luton to the Football League Trophy final at Wembley Stadium, making two penalty saves against Brighton.

Price joined League One side Brentford on a season-long loan deal on 8 July 2009. He made 18 appearances for Brentford, but didn't make an appearance after January due to the arrival of Wojciech Szczęsny, who was on loan from Arsenal at the time. Upon his return to Derby at the end of the 2009–10 season, it was announced that his contract would not be renewed and he left the club with just nine appearances in his three-years there.

=== Crystal Palace ===
After leaving the Rams, Price signed a 3-year contract to join Crystal Palace as understudy to Julián Speroni. He made his Palace debut in March against Burnley after Speroni had suffered an injury. On Friday 11 April 2014, Price signed for League 2 side Mansfield Town on loan as emergency goalkeeper cover for the injured Alan Marriott. On 17 November 2014, Price signed on loan with League One club Crawley Town until 20 December. At the end of his loan spell he returned to Crystal Palace but on 16 January 2015 it was announced that he had rejoined Crawley until the end of the season. Price was not offered a new contract by Palace at the end of the 2014–15 season.

=== Sheffield Wednesday ===
Following his release from Crystal Palace, he signed a one-year contract with Championship side Sheffield Wednesday.

=== Rotherham United ===
At the end of his contract at Sheffield Wednesday, Price signed a two-year deal with Championship side Rotherham United. He was released by Rotherham at the end of the 2017–18 season, but re-signed for the club on a two–year deal on 6 July 2018. On 6 November 2020, Price was released by Rotherham United after four years with the club. It was to be his last club as a player before retiring from the game.

== International career ==
Price received his first call-up to the full Wales international squad for a friendly against Slovenia on 17 August 2005, but missed out on his first cap after he was forced to withdraw with a knee injury. He then made his debut against Cyprus on 17 November 2005. He won the last of his 11 caps in a 2–0 2014 World Cup qualifying defeat to Croatia on 16 October 2012.

== Coaching career ==
Following retirement as a player, Price joined AFC Bournemouth as goalkeeping coach for the club's U21 side in November 2020. After half a season in the role, in August 2021 he joined previous loan club League One club Milton Keynes Dons as First-Team Goalkeeping Coach under newly appointed Head Coach Liam Manning.

== Career statistics ==
Appearances and goals by club, season and competition
Club	Season	League			FA Cup		League Cup		Other		Total	
Club	Season	Division	Apps	Goals	Apps	Goals	Apps	Goals	Apps	Goals	Apps	Goals
Ipswich Town	2003–04	First Division	1	0	0	0	0	0	0	0	1	0
Ipswich Town	2004–05	Championship	8	0	0	0	2	0	0	0	10	0
Ipswich Town	2005–06	Championship	25	0	0	0	1	0	—		26	0
Ipswich Town	2006–07	Championship	34	0	3	0	1	0	—		38	0
Ipswich Town	Total		68	0	3	0	4	0	0	0	75	0
Cambridge United (loan)	2004–05	League Two	6	0	0	0	0	0	0	0	6	0
Derby County	2007–08	Premier League	6	0	3	0	0	0	—		9	0
Milton Keynes Dons (loan)	2008–09	League One	2	0	1	0	0	0	0	0	3	0
Luton Town (loan)	2008–09	League Two	1	0	1	0	0	0	1 (Note: Appearance in Football League Trophy)	0	2	0
Brentford (loan)	2009–10	League One	13	0	4	0	0	0	1	0	18	0
Crystal Palace	2010–11	Championship	1	0	0	0	0	0	—		1	0
Crystal Palace	2011–12	Championship	5	0	1	0	5	0	—		11	0
Crystal Palace	2012–13	Championship	0	0	2	0	2	0	0	0	4	0
Crystal Palace	Total		6	0	3	0	7	0	0	0	16	0
Mansfield Town (loan)	2013–14	League Two	5	0	0	0	0	0	0	0	5	0
Crawley Town (loan)	2014–15	League One	18	0	0	0	0	0	0	0	18	0
Sheffield Wednesday	2015–16	Championship	5	0	1	0	1	0	0	0	7	0
Rotherham United	2016–17	Championship	17	0	1	0	1	0	—		19	0
Rotherham United	2017–18	League One	1	0	0	0	0	0	1 (Note: Appearance(s) in EFL Trophy)	0	2	0
Rotherham United	2018–19	Championship	1	0	0	0	2	0	—		3	0
Rotherham United	2019–20	League One	1	0	0	0	1	0	3	0	5	0
Rotherham United	2020–21	Championship	0	0	0	0	0	0	—		0	0
Rotherham United	Total		20	0	1	0	4	0	4	0	29	0
Career total			150	0	17	0	16	0	6	0	189	0

=== International ===
As of match played 16 October 2012

Appearances and goals by national team and year
National team	Year	Apps	Goals
Wales
Wales	2005	1	0
Wales	2006	2	0
Wales	2007	1	0
Wales	2008	2	0
Wales	2009	1	0
Wales	2011	1	0
Wales	2012	3	0
Total		11	0

== Honours ==
Crystal Palace

- Football League Championship play-offs: 2013

Rotherham United

- EFL League One play-offs: 2018
