= 2017–18 Sheffield Wednesday F.C. season =

English football club season

Sheffield Wednesday
2017–18 season
- Chairman: Dejphon Chansiri
- Manager: Carlos Carvalhal (until 24 December 2017); Lee Bullen (caretaker; 24 December 2017 – 5 January 2018); Jos Luhukay (from 5 January 2018)
- Stadium: Hillsborough, Owlerton
- Championship: 15th
- FA Cup: 5th round (eliminated by Swansea City)
- EFL Cup: 2nd round (eliminated by Bolton Wanderers)
- Top goalscorer: League: Atdhe Nuhiu (11); All: Atdhe Nuhiu (14)
- Highest home attendance: 32,839 (vs. Sheffield United; Championship)
- Lowest home attendance: 11,682 (vs. Chesterfield; League Cup)
- Average home league attendance: 25,995
Home colours	Away colours	Third colours

The 2017–18 season was Sheffield Wednesday's sixth consecutive season in the Championship. Along with competing in the Championship, the club also participated in the FA Cup and EFL Cup.

The season covers the period from 1 July 2017 to 30 June 2018.

== Overview ==
=== August ===
Sheffield Wednesday kicked off their 2017–18 campaign with an away game against Preston North End, which they lost 1–0. This was followed by a 4–1 win against Chesterfield in the first round of the EFL Cup, which was The Owls' first game of the season at Hillsborough. A few days later, Sheffield Wednesday's first home league game of the season ended in a 1–1 draw against Queens Park Rangers, with Sam Winnall scoring an equalising goal in the second half. Another 1–1 draw at home followed, with David Jones scoring his first goal for the club to equalise against the recently relegated Sunderland.

The Owls' first league win of the season came against Fulham, with Owls striker Steven Fletcher scoring the only goal of the game. The Owls' final game of the month was a disappointing 1–1 draw at the Pirelli Stadium against Burton Albion followed, leaving Wednesday in 16th place in the league with six points.

=== September ===
The Owls started September with a home game against Nottingham Forest, which they won 3–1 with goals from Steven Fletcher, Gary Hooper and Kieran Lee (his first game upon return from injury) respectively. A few days later, Wednesday defeated Brentford 2–1 at home, with Gary Hooper and Ross Wallace both scoring. Up next was an away game at Cardiff City, with The Owls denied a win after a last second equalising goal. A heavy 4–2 loss followed in the home fixture of the Steel City derby, and Wednesday would again lose in their next game away at struggling Birmingham City, who earned only their second win of the season by defeating Wednesday 1–0 to leave them 14th in the Championship.

=== October ===
At the start of October, Sheffield Wednesday beat local rivals Leeds United 3–0 at Hillsborough, thanks to a brace from Gary Hooper and a goal from Kieran Lee. Two successive away defeats to Bolton Wanderers and Derby County respectively followed, with the next home game resulting in a 1–1 draw against local rivals Barnsley. In their fifth and final game in October, Wednesday earned a 2–1 win at home against Millwall, with Adam Reach and Jordan Rhodes scoring for The Owls.

=== November ===
Wednesday started November with an away match at Villa Park, which ended in another 2–1 win for The Owls after winger Adam Reach and striker Jordan Rhodes both scored for the second game on the run. This match would ultimately prove to be the final victory at the club for manager Carlos Carvalhal, with Sheffield Wednesday failing to win another game during the rest of November, with three consecutive draws against Bristol City at Hillsborough and Ipswich Town and Reading away respectively.

=== December ===
December started with a 2–2 draw at Hillsborough against Hull City, with The Owls being denied the points in the very last minute of the game. Three consecutive losses followed to continue The Owls' disappointing run, losing 3–1 away at Norwich City away, 1–0 to Wolves and 2–1 to Middlesbrough at Hillsborough, with the latter being Carlos Carvalhal's final game in charge of the club. The Portuguese left the club by mutual consent on Christmas Eve, after two and a half seasons at the helm of the club.

Lee Bullen was appointed caretaker manager until a permanent appointment is made. Bullen's first came as caretaker resulted in a 3–0 victory over Nottingham Forest, with goals from Adam Reach, Jordan Rhodes and Lucas João. The Owls' final game of 2017 resulted in a 2–0 loss to Brentford at Griffin Park.

=== January ===
The Owls got off to a poor start in 2018, with a heavy 3–0 defeat at Hillsborough against Burton Albion.

On 5 January 2018, The Owls unveiled Jos Luhukay as the new manager of the club. For The Owls' game in the FA Cup third round against Carlisle United, which ended as disappointing goalless draw, Luhukay watched from the crowd. Luhukay's first game in charge of the club was the reverse leg of the Steel City derby at Bramall Lane, which ended in a goalless draw and saw the dismissal of captain Glenn Loovens sent off after he received two yellow cards.

Sheffield Wednesday's first victory of 2018 came in their FA Cup third round replay at Hillsborough, which Wednesday won 2–0 after Marco Matias and Atdhe Nuhiu both found the target for The Owls. The reverse league fixture against Cardiff City ended in another goalless draw, despite Adam Reach, Jordan Rhodes and Lucas João all having opportunities to score. Wednesday then faced Reading at home in the fourth round of the FA Cup, which ended in a 3–1 victory for The Owls, thanks to a brace from striker Atdhe Nuhiu and winger George Boyd's first goal for the club.

January ended in another goalless draw in the league for The Owls, this time against Middlesbrough at The Riverside Stadium.

=== February ===
Wednesday lost their first league game of February, which was a 3–1 defeat at Hillsborough against Birmingham City. A 1–1 away draw against Barnsley followed, with The Owls picking up their only league win of the month, a 2–0 home win, against Derby County. The Owls then faced former manager Carlos Carvalhal's new team Swansea City in the fifth round of the FA Cup, earning a replay after a 0–0 draw at Hillsborough.

Two successive league defeats followed, 2–1 away against Millwall and 4–2 at home against Aston Villa, with The Owls being 2–1 at half time in the latter. The Owls then bowed out of the FA Cup after losing 2–0 in their FA Cup replay against Swansea City.

=== March ===
March saw Wednesday's poor form in the league continue, losing 4–0 to Bristol City and 2–1 to Ipswich Town, the former being The Owls' heaviest defeat of the season. A 1–1 draw against Bolton Wanderers at Hillsborough followed, before The Owls defeated fierce local rivals Leeds 2–1 thanks to a brace from Atdhe Nuhiu, who scored the winning goal in extra time. Sheffield Wednesday then won 4–1 at home against Preston North End, with Atdhe Nuhiu scoring twice and a goal each from Lucas João and Fernando Forestieri.

=== April ===
In Sheffield Wednesday's first league game of April, they won 3–1 at the Stadium of Light, with Lucas João, vice captain Tom Lees and Atdhe Nuhiu all scoring. Two successive losses followed, 1–0 against promotion challengers Fulham and 4–2 against Queens Park Rangers.

Wednesday then won their next two league games, with a rare Jordan Rhodes goal against Hull City enough to earn The Owls three points. In the next league fixture, which was against Reading at Hillsborough, Fernando Forestieri scored a brace with George Boyd also scoring in a 3–0 win. The final game of April was a 0–0 draw with Wolves.

=== May ===
Sheffield Wednesday ended the 2017/18 season with a 5–1 win over Norwich City at Hillsborough, with Atdhe Nuhiu scoring a hattrick and Fernando Forestieri and on-loan central defender Frederico Venâncio scoring a goal each. It was also Owls captain Glenn Loovens' final game for the club, with his contract expiring at the end of the season.

== Player transfers & contracts ==
=== Transfers in ===
Date from	Position	Nationality	Name	From	Fee	Ref.
3 July 2017	RM	(Scotland)	George Boyd	(England) Burnley	Free	
30 August 2017	CB	(Netherlands)	Joost van Aken	(Netherlands) SC Heerenveen	Undisclosed	
18 January 2018	CM	(Netherlands)	Joey Pelupessy	(Netherlands) Heracles Almelo	Undisclosed	

=== Transfers out ===
Date from	Position	Nationality	Name	To	Fee	Ref.
1 July 2017	CB	(France)	Claude Dielna	(United States) New England Revolution	Released	(Note: Claude Dielna joined New England Revolution following his release.)
1 July 2017	LM	(Netherlands)	Urby Emanuelson	(Netherlands) FC Utrecht	Released	(Note: Urby Emanuelson joined FC Utrecht following his release.)
1 July 2017	CB	(Curaçao)	Darryl Lachman	(Netherlands) Willem II	Released	(Note: Darryl Lachman joined Willem II following his release.)
1 July 2017	CB	(France)	Vincent Sasso	(Portugal) Belenenses	Released	(Note: Vincent Sasso joined Belenenses following his release.)
1 July 2017	DM	(Portugal)	Jose Semedo	(Portugal) Vitória F.C.	Released	(Note: Jose Semedo joined Vitoria de Setúbal following his release.)
1 July 2017	RW	(Senegal)	Modou Sougou	Free agent	Released	
10 July 2017	CM	(Portugal)	Filipe Melo	(Portugal) Chaves	Free transfer	
31 August 2017	CM	(England)	Lewis McGugan	(England) Northampton Town	Released	(Note: Lewis McGugan joined Northampton Town following his release.)
3 March 2018	CM	(United States)	James Murphy	(United States) Los Angeles FC	Undisclosed	

=== Loans in ===
Start date	Position	Nationality	Name	From	End date	Ref.
16 August 2017	CB	(Portugal)	Frederico Venâncio	(Portugal) Vitória de Setúbal	End of season	
31 August 2017	CM	(England)	Jacob Butterfield	(England) Derby County	End of season	

=== Loans out ===
Start date	Position	Nationality	Name	To	End date	Ref.
31 August 2017	FW	(England)	Sam Winnall	(England) Derby County	30 June 2018	
6 December 2017	GK	(England)	Cameron Dawson	(England) Chesterfield	20 December 2017	
5 January 2018	GK	(England)	Jake Kean	(England) Grimsby Town	30 June 2018	
31 January 2018	MF	(England)	Matt Penney	(England) Mansfield Town	30 June 2018	

=== New contracts ===
Date from	Position	Nationality	Name	Length	Expiry	Ref.
28 June 2017	GK	(England)	Cameron Dawson	3 years	June 2020	
9 August 2017	GK	(England)	Joe Wildsmith	5 years	June 2022	
18 December 2017	DF	(Denmark)	Frederik Nielsen	1 1/2 years	June 2019	
4 January 2018	MF	(England)	Matt Penney	1 1/2 years	June 2019	
2 February 2018	MF	(England)	Alex Hunt	2 1/2 years	June 2020	
15 February 2018	DF	(England)	Jordan Thorniley	3 1/2 years	June 2021	
16 February 2018	DF	(England)	Connor O'Grady	1 1/2 years	June 2019	
16 February 2018	MF	(England)	Jack Stobbs	2 1/2 years	June 2020	
5 March 2018	MF	(England)	Connor Kirby	2 1/2 years	June 2020	
25 April 2018	DF	(Wales)	Ash Baker	2 1/2 years	June 2020	
1 May 2018	DF	(Czech Republic)	Daniel Pudil	1 years	June 2019	
2 May 2018	MF	(England)	Warren Clark	1 years	June 2019	
2 May 2018	MF	(England)	Jack Lee	2 years	June 2020	
3 May 2018	DF	(Republic of Ireland)	Ciaran Brennan	—	—	
4 May 2018	DF	(England)	Joe West	1 year	June 2019	
10 May 2018	FW	(Kosovo)	Atdhe Nuhiu	2 years	June 2020	
11 May 2018	GK	(England)	Dan Wallis	1 year	June 2019	
11 May 2018	MF	(England)	Ben Hughes	1 year	June 2019	
25 June 2018	FW	(Bulgaria)	Preslav Borukov	2 years	June 2020	

== Competitions ==
=== Friendlies ===
As of 12 July 2017, Sheffield Wednesday have announced seven pre-season friendlies against Alfreton Town, Mansfield Town, Doncaster Rovers, Portimonense, Vitória de Setúbal Farense and Rangers.

11 July 2017	Alfreton Town	0–5	Sheffield Wednesday	Alfreton
19:30 BST		Report	Rhodes 22', 24'; Nuhiu 62'; Reach 66'; O'Grady 88'	Stadium: North Street; Attendance: 1,426; Referee: Nigel Smith

15 July 2017	Mansfield Town	2–3	Sheffield Wednesday	Mansfield
15:00 BST	Taft 32'; Bennett 81'	Report	Rhodes 11'; Lees 53'; João 84'	Stadium: Field Mill; Attendance: 4,319; Referee: John Brooks

19 July 2017	Portimonense	0–1	Sheffield Wednesday	Portimão, Portugal
20:00 WEST		Report	Reach 25'	Stadium: Estádio Municipal de Portimão

20 July 2017	Farense	1–1	Sheffield Wednesday	Ferreiras, Portugal
20:00 WEST	Jorginho 90'	Report	Fletcher 78'	Stadium: Estádio da Nora

22 July 2017	Vitória de Setúbal	0–0	Sheffield Wednesday	Albufeira, Portugal
20:00 WEST		Report		Stadium: Estádio Municipal de Albufeira

26 July 2017	Doncaster Rovers	1–2	Sheffield Wednesday	Doncaster
19:30 BST	Mandeville 43'	Report	Winnall 30'; Hooper 66'	Stadium: Keepmoat Stadium; Attendance: 7,366; Referee: Darren England

30 July 2017	Sheffield Wednesday	0–2	Rangers	Owlerton, Sheffield
15:00 BST		Report	Windass 43'; Miller 55'	Stadium: Hillsborough Stadium; Attendance: 20,739; Referee: Ross Joyce

=== Championship ===
==== League table ====
Pos	Team	Pld	W	D	L	GF	GA	GD	Pts
13	Leeds United	46	17	9	20	59	64	−5	60
14	Norwich City	46	15	15	16	49	60	−11	60
15	Sheffield Wednesday	46	14	15	17	59	60	−1	57
16	Queens Park Rangers	46	15	11	20	58	70	−12	56
17	Nottingham Forest	46	15	8	23	51	65	−14	53

Source: English Football League
Rules for classification: 1) Points; 2) Goal difference; 3) Number of goals scored

==== Results summary ====
Overall								Home						Away					
Pld	W	D	L	GF	GA	GD	Pts	W	D	L	GF	GA	GD	W	D	L	GF	GA	GD
46	14	15	17	59	60	−1	57	8	7	8	37	31	+6	6	8	9	22	29	−7

Last updated: 6 May 2018.

==== Results by matchday ====
Matchday	1	2	3	4	5	6	7	8	9	10	11	12	13	14	15	16	17	18	19	20	21	22	23	24	25	26	27	28	29	30	31	32	33	34	35	36	37	38	39	40	41	42	43	44	45	46
Ground	A	H	H	A	A	H	H	A	H	A	H	A	A	H	H	A	H	A	A	H	A	H	H	A	A	H	A	H	A	H	A	H	A	H	A	H	H	A	H	A	H	A	A	H	A	H
Result	L	D	D	W	D	W	W	D	L	L	W	L	L	D	W	W	D	D	D	D	L	L	L	W	L	L	D	D	D	L	D	W	L	L	L	L	D	W	W	W	L	L	W	W	D	W
Position	22	17	20	13	16	10	6	9	10	14	12	12	16	16	14	11	9	11	11	12	14	15	15	14	16	16	15	17	16	17	16	15	16	17	17	17	18	17	17	16	16	17	16	15	16	15

Updated to match(es) played on 6 May 2018. Source: Statto.com
A = Away; H = Home; W = Win; D = Draw; L = Loss

==== Matches ====
On 21 June 2017, the league fixtures were announced.

5 August 2017 1	Preston North End	1–0	Sheffield Wednesday	Deepdale, Preston
15:00 BST	Pearson (yellow card) 22'; Hugill (yellow card) 67'; Johnson 79' (pen.)	Report	Forestieri (yellow card) 33'; Bannan (yellow card) 55'; Pudil (yellow card) 74'	Stadium: Deepdale Stadium; Attendance: 18,267 (5,706 away); Referee: Tony Harrington

12 August 2017 2	Sheffield Wednesday	1–1	QPR	Owlerton, Sheffield
15:00 BST	Winnall 48'	Report	Mackie 23'; Lynch (yellow card) 40'; Bidwell (yellow card) 66'; Scowen (yellow card) 82'	Stadium: Hillsborough Stadium; Attendance: 25,537 (681 away); Referee: Chris Kavanagh

16 August 2017 3	Sheffield Wednesday	1–1	Sunderland	Owlerton, Sheffield
19:45 BST	Jones 70'	Report	Honeyman 4'; Galloway (yellow card) 77'	Stadium: Hillsborough Stadium; Attendance: 27,631 (2,714 away); Referee: Steve Martin

19 August 2017 4	Fulham	0–1	Sheffield Wednesday	Fulham, London
15:00 BST	McDonald (yellow card) 72'; Fredericks (yellow card) 90+1'	Report	Fletcher 64'	Stadium: Craven Cottage; Attendance: 20,165 (3,108 away); Referee: Stuart Attwell

26 August 2017 5	Burton Albion	1–1	Sheffield Wednesday	Burton upon Trent
15:00 BST	Mason 65'	Report	Hooper 36'; Jones (yellow card) 86'; Fox (yellow card) 90'	Stadium: Pirelli Stadium; Attendance: 5,084 (1,661 away); Referee: Darren Bond

9 September 2017 6	Sheffield Wednesday	3–1	Nottingham Forest	Owlerton, Sheffield
17:30 BST	Hooper 23'; Fletcher 63'; Lee 70'; Wallace (yellow card) 75'	Report	Osborn 29'	Stadium: Hillsborough Stadium; Attendance: 25,710 (2,302 away); Referee: Andy Madley

12 September 2017 7	Sheffield Wednesday	2–1	Brentford	Owlerton, Sheffield
19:45 BST	Hooper 45+1'; Wallace 70'; Hunt (yellow card) 89'; Rhodes (yellow card) 90+1'; Lee (yellow card) 90+2'	Report	Yennaris 9'	Stadium: Hillsborough Stadium; Attendance: 23,536 (325 away); Referee: Jeremy Simpson

16 September 2017 8	Cardiff City	1–1	Sheffield Wednesday	Leckwith, Cardiff
15:00 BST	Peltier (yellow card) 29'; Bamba 90+4'	Report	Hooper 39'; Pudil (yellow card) 44' van Aken (yellow card) 62'	Stadium: Cardiff City Stadium; Attendance: 19,137 (2,148 away); Referee: Lee Probert

24 September 2017 9	Sheffield Wednesday	2–4	Sheffield United	Owlerton, Sheffield
13:15 BST	Bannan (yellow card) 12'; Hooper 45+2'; João 66'	Report	Fleck 3', (yellow card) 90+1'; Clarke 15', 77'; Duffy 67'; Basham (yellow card) 75'	Stadium: Hillsborough Stadium; Attendance: 32,839 (2,945 away); Referee: Simon Hooper

27 September 2017 10	Birmingham City	1–0	Sheffield Wednesday	Bordesley, Birmingham
19:45 BST	Vassell 76'	Report		Stadium: St Andrews; Attendance: 20,365 (2,494 away); Referee: Steve Martin

1 October 2017 11	Sheffield Wednesday	3–0	Leeds United	Owlerton, Sheffield
15:00 BST	Hooper 25', 41'; Lee 82'; Palmer (yellow card) 90+5'	Report		Stadium: Hillsborough Stadium; Attendance: 27,972 (4,600 away); Referee: Andy Madley

14 October 2017 12	Bolton Wanderers	2–1	Sheffield Wednesday	Horwich, Bolton
15:00 BST	Ameobi 10'; Beevers (yellow card) 46'; Hutchinson 61' (o.g.); Morais (yellow card) 68'; Vela (yellow card) 84'	Report	Hunt (yellow card) 39'; Lee 68', (yellow card) 88'; Hooper (yellow card) 84'	Stadium: Macron Stadium; Attendance: 17,967 (4,797 away); Referee: David Coote

21 October 2017 13	Derby County	2–0	Sheffield Wednesday	Pride Park, Derby
15:00 BST	Vydra 5' (pen.); Nugent (yellow card) 45+2'; Russell (yellow card) 48'; Johnson 86'	Report	Loovens (red card); Lee (yellow card) 21'; Reach (yellow card) 64'	Stadium: Pride Park Stadium; Attendance: 27,426 (3,154 away); Referee: Scott Duncan

28 October 2017 14	Sheffield Wednesday	1–1	Barnsley	Owlerton, Sheffield
12:30 GMT	Reach 34', (yellow card) 87' van Aken (yellow card) 45'	Report	Hammill (yellow card) 37'; Barnes 67'	Stadium: Hillsborough Stadium; Attendance: 27,097 (2,410 away); Referee: Anthony Taylor

31 October 2017 15	Sheffield Wednesday	2–1	Millwall	Owlerton, Sheffield
19:45 GMT	Reach 3'; Rhodes 43'	Report	Elliott 13'; Cooper (yellow card) 53' (red card) 90+3'	Stadium: Hillsborough Stadium; Attendance: 23,403 (367 away); Referee: James Linington

4 November 2017 16	Aston Villa	1–2	Sheffield Wednesday	Aston, Birmingham
15:00 GMT	Samba 90+6'	Report	Reach 1'; Rhodes 23'; Wallace (yellow card) 56'	Stadium: Villa Park; Attendance: 33,154 (2,718 away); Referee: Geoff Eltringham

18 November 2017 17	Sheffield Wednesday	0–0	Bristol City	Hillsborough, Sheffield
15:00 GMT	Fox (yellow card) 72'	Report	Baker (yellow card) 90+1'	Stadium: Hillsborough Stadium; Attendance: 25,916 (1,082 away); Referee: Tony Harrington

22 November 2017 18	Ipswich Town	2–2	Sheffield Wednesday	Ipswich
19:45 GMT	Garner 48'; Skuse (yellow card) 59'; Waghorn 70'	Report	Hooper 64' (pen.); Lee (yellow card) 77'; Hunt (yellow card) 81'; Nuhiu 90+4'	Stadium: Portman Road; Attendance: 15,702 (1,158 away); Referee: Keith Stroud

25 November 2017 19	Reading	0–0	Sheffield Wednesday	Reading
15:00 GMT		Report	Loovens (yellow card) 24'	Stadium: Madejski Stadium; Attendance: 18,382 (3,055 away); Referee: David Coote

2 December 2017 20	Sheffield Wednesday	2–2	Hull City	Owlerton, Sheffield
15:00 GMT	van Aken (yellow card) 35'; Reach (yellow card) 48'; Hooper (yellow card) 45+1', (goal) 70', 85'	Report	Campbell 21'; Stewart (yellow card) 52'; Larsson (yellow card) 71'; Dawson 90+5'	Stadium: Hillsborough Stadium; Attendance: 25,412 (1,783 away); Referee: Mike Jones

9 December 2017 21	Norwich City	3–1	Sheffield Wednesday	Norwich
17:30 GMT	Vrancic (yellow card) 48'; Maddison 55'; Klose 68'; Oliveira 90+5' (pen.)	Report	Rhodes 18'	Stadium: Carrow Road; Attendance: 25,561 (1,553 away); Referee: James Linington

15 December 2017 22	Sheffield Wednesday	0–1	Wolves	Owlerton, Sheffield
19:45 GMT	Butterfield (yellow card) 33'; Fox (yellow card) 59' (yellow-red card) 86'	Report	Jota (yellow card) 29'; Neves 34' (yellow card) 82'; Bennett (yellow card) 43'	Stadium: Hillsborough Stadium; Attendance: 23,809 (1,267 away); Referee: Darren Bond

23 December 2017 23	Sheffield Wednesday	1–2	Middlesbrough	Owlerton, Sheffield
15:00 GMT	Wallace 30'; Palmer (yellow card) 33' van Aken (yellow card) 57'	Report	Leadbitter (penalty missed) 71'; Howson 71'; Shotton 83'	Stadium: Hillsborough Stadium; Attendance: 27,471 (3,179 away); Referee: Peter Bankes

26 December 2017 24	Nottingham Forest	0–3	Sheffield Wednesday	Nottingham
15:00 GMT	Brereton (yellow card) 88'; Mancienne (yellow card) 90+5'	Report	Reach 5'; Rhodes 45+1' (pen.); João 65'	Stadium: City Ground; Attendance: 28,635 (2,001 away); Referee: Andy Madley

30 December 2017 25	Brentford	2–0	Sheffield Wednesday	Brentford, London
15:00 GMT	Vibe 20'; Sawyers (yellow card) 39'; Jofezoon 83'	Report	Wallace (yellow card) 39'; Hutchinson (yellow card) 44'; Pudil (yellow card) 49'	Stadium: Griffin Park; Attendance: 10,853 (1,645 away); Referee: David Coote

1 January 2018 26	Sheffield Wednesday	0–3	Burton Albion	Owlerton, Sheffield
15:00 GMT	Butterfield (yellow card) 6'; Wallace (yellow card) 90+2'	Report	Flanagan 37', (yellow card) 62'; Dyer 50'; Naylor 90'	Stadium: Hillsborough Stadium; Attendance: 25,506 (387 away); Referee: Darren England

12 January 2018 27	Sheffield United	0–0	Sheffield Wednesday	Sheffield
19:45 GMT		Report	Loovens (yellow card) 25' (yellow-red card) 64'; Venâncio (yellow card) 44'; Wallace (yellow card) 74'; Nuhiu (yellow card) 86'	Stadium: Bramall Lane; Attendance: 31,120 (2,218 away); Referee: David Coote

20 January 2018 28	Sheffield Wednesday	0–0	Cardiff City	Owlerton, Sheffield
17:30 GMT	Wallace (yellow card) 77'	Report	Grujić (yellow card) 8'; Bamba (yellow card) 40'; Richards (yellow card) 90+2'	Stadium: Hillsborough Stadium; Attendance: 23,277 (510 away); Referee: Roger East

30 January 2018 29	Middlesbrough	0–0	Sheffield Wednesday	Middlesbrough
19:45 GMT		Report	Thorniley (yellow card) 11'; Reach (yellow card) 87'	Stadium: Riverside Stadium; Attendance: 24,120 (1,261 away); Referee: James Linington

3 February 2018 30	Sheffield Wednesday	1–3	Birmingham City	Owlerton, Sheffield
15:00 GMT	Matias (red card) 38'; João 54'; Pudil (yellow card) 37' (yellow-red card) 68'; Nuhiu (yellow card) 68'	Report	Davis 8', (yellow card) 77'; Jota 21', 45+5'; Stockdale (yellow card) 36'; Ndoye (yellow card) 79'	Stadium: Hillsborough Stadium; Attendance: 25,648 (1,427 away); Referee: Scott Duncan

10 February 2018 31	Barnsley	1–1	Sheffield Wednesday	Barnsley
12:15 GMT	McBurnie 21'; Hammill (yellow card) 45'		Nuhiu 18', (yellow card) 19'; Jones (yellow card) 79'; Wallace (yellow card) 90+3'	Stadium: Oakwell; Attendance: 16,858 (4,069 away); Referee: Lee Probert

13 February 2018 32	Sheffield Wednesday	2–0	Derby County	Owlerton, Sheffield
19:45 GMT	João 18', 47'; Hunt (yellow card) 25'; Loovens (yellow card) 81'; Pudil (yellow card) 90'	Report	Ledley (yellow card) 58'; Vydra (yellow card) 68'; Forsyth (yellow card) 90+4'	Stadium: Hillsborough Stadium; Attendance: 24,180 (1,791 away); Referee: David Coote

20 February 2018 33	Millwall	2–1	Sheffield Wednesday	Bermondsey, London
19:45 GMT	Gregory 52'; Morison 63'	Report	Pelupessy 42', (yellow card) 90+11'; Venâncio (yellow card) 47'; Reach (yellow card) 76'; Nuhiu (yellow card) 90+7'	Stadium: The Den; Attendance: 11,007 (1,502 away); Referee: Peter Bankes

24 February 2018 34	Sheffield Wednesday	2–4	Aston Villa	Owlerton, Sheffield
15:00 GMT	Clare 14'; Pelupessy (yellow card) 32'; João 45+2'; Boyd (yellow card) 82'; Pudil (yellow card) 90+6'	Report	Grabban 21'; Whelan 67'; Hourihane 87'; Snodgrass 90+3' (pen.)	Stadium: Hillsborough Stadium; Attendance: 28,604 (4,630 away); Referee: Neil Swarbrick

3 March 2018 35	Bristol City	4–0	Sheffield Wednesday	Ashton Gate, Bristol
15:00 GMT	Reid 13', 35', 62' (pen.); Pisano (yellow card) 22'; Brownhill 43'	Report	Pudil (yellow card) 20'; Palmer (yellow card) 59'; Reach (yellow card) 82'	Stadium: Ashton Gate; Attendance: 22,022 (1,426 away); Referee: Tony Harrington

6 March 2018 36	Sheffield Wednesday	1–2	Ipswich Town	Owlerton, Sheffield
19:45 GMT	Boyd (yellow card) 33'; João 69'	Report	Carter-Vickers (yellow card) 41'; Waghorn 51', 83'; Chambers (yellow card) 83'	Stadium: Hillsborough Stadium; Attendance: 22,733 (536 away); Referee: Oliver Langford

10 March 2018 37	Sheffield Wednesday	1–1	Bolton Wanderers	Owlerton, Sheffield
15:00 GMT	Boyd 78'	Report	Wilbraham 90+3'	Stadium: Hillsborough Stadium; Attendance: 26,809 (1,752 away); Referee: Darren Bond

17 March 2018 38	Leeds United	1–2	Sheffield Wednesday	Leeds
15:00 GMT	Grot 86'	Report	Hutchinson (yellow card) 63'; Nuhiu (yellow card) 13', (goal) 71', 90+1'; Reach (yellow card) 74'; Wildsmith (yellow card) 90'	Stadium: Elland Road; Attendance: 31,638 (2,039 away); Referee: Keith Stroud

30 March 2018 39	Sheffield Wednesday	4–1	Preston North End	Owlerton, Sheffield
15:00 BST	Hutchinson (yellow card) 1'; Nuhiu (yellow card) 16', (goal) 50', 90+2'; João 52'; Forestieri 90+6'	Report	Moult 72'; Davies (yellow card) 90+5'	Stadium: Hillsborough Stadium; Attendance: 26,588 (1,419 away); Referee: Tim Robinson

2 April 2018 40	Sunderland	1–3	Sheffield Wednesday	Sunderland
15:00 BST	McGeady (yellow card) 50'; Honeyman 61'	Report	Bannan (yellow card) 40'; João 59'; Lees 68'; Nuhiu 75'	Stadium: Stadium of Light; Attendance: 29,786 (2,600 away); Referee: Simon Hooper

7 April 2018 41	Sheffield Wednesday	0–1	Fulham	Owlerton, Sheffield
15:00 BST	Pudil (yellow card) 85'; Butterfield (yellow card) 90+1'	Report	Mitrovic 78'	Stadium: Hillsborough Stadium; Attendance: 25,653 (1,453 away); Referee: Steve Martin

10 April 2018 42	QPR	4–2	Sheffield Wednesday	Shepherd's Bush, London
BST	Smyth 8'; Bidwell 10'; Sylla 15', 53' (pen.); Scowen (yellow card) 40'	Report	Forestieri 61'; Nuhiu 69'; Pudil (yellow card) 86'	Stadium: Loftus Road; Attendance: 12,521 (1,529 away); Referee: Oliver Langford

14 April 2018 43	Hull City	0–1	Sheffield Wednesday	Kingston upon Hull
15:00 BST	Hector (yellow card) 40'	Report	Rhodes 18'; Palmer (yellow card) 70'	Stadium: KCOM Stadium; Attendance: 16,417 (2,357 away); Referee: Scott Duncan

21 April 2018 44	Sheffield Wednesday	3–0	Reading	Owlerton, Sheffield
15:00 BST	Forestieri 34', 73'; Boyd 52'	Report	Blackett (red card) 76'	Stadium: Hillsborough Stadium; Attendance: 24,373 (341 away); Referee: Jeremy Simpson

28 April 2018 45	Wolves	0–0	Sheffield Wednesday	Wolverhampton
15:00 BST	Saiss (yellow card) 83'	Report		Stadium: Molineux Stadium; Attendance: 29,794 (2,193 away); Referee: Simon Hooper

6 May 2018 46	Sheffield Wednesday	5–1	Norwich City	Owlerton, Sheffield
12:30 BST	Nuhiu 14', 60', 90+3' (pen.), (yellow card) 28'; Forestieri 30'; Venâncio 58', Thorniley (yellow card) 89'	Report	Klose (yellow card) 57', (goal) 83'	Stadium: Hillsborough Stadium; Attendance: 28,189 (1,529 away); Referee: Robert Jones

=== FA Cup ===
In the FA Cup, Sheffield Wednesday entered the competition in the third round and were drawn away to Carlisle United. The first game ended in a goalless draw, with the replay taking place at Hillsborough on 16 January. In the fourth round, The Owls were drawn against Reading at home.

On 29 January 2018, Sheffield Wednesday were drawn against either Notts County or Swansea City in the fifth round draw.

6 January 2018 3rd round	Carlisle United	0–0	Sheffield Wednesday	Carlisle
15:00 GMT	Cosgrove (yellow card) 45'	Report		Stadium: Brunton Park; Attendance: 7,793; Referee: David Webb

16 January 2018 3rd round replay	Sheffield Wednesday	2–0	Carlisle United	Owlerton, Sheffield
19:45 GMT	Matias 28'; Nuhiu 66'	Report		Stadium: Hillsborough Stadium; Attendance: 12,003; Referee: Michael Salisbury

26 January 2018 4th round	Sheffield Wednesday	3–1	Reading	Owlerton, Sheffield
19:45 GMT	Pelupessy (yellow card) 6'; Matias (yellow card) 16'; Nuhiu 29', 53'; Boyd 61'	Report	Ilori (yellow card) 83'; Dawson 87' (o.g.)	Stadium: Hillsborough Stadium; Attendance: 14,848; Referee: John Brooks

17 February 2018 5th round	Sheffield Wednesday	0–0	Swansea City	Owlerton, Sheffield
12:30 GMT	Wallace (yellow card) 78'; Reach (yellow card) 83'	Report	van der Hoorn (yellow card) 65'	Stadium: Hillsborough; Attendance: 19,427; Referee: Paul Tierney

27 February 2018 5th round replay	Swansea City	2–0	Sheffield Wednesday	Landore, Swansea
19:45 GMT	J. Ayew 55'; Dyer 80'	Report	Rhodes (yellow card) 65'	Stadium: Liberty Stadium; Referee: Stuart Attwell

=== EFL Cup ===
On 16 June 2017, Sheffield Wednesday were drawn at home to Chesterfield in the first round. After winning their first-round game, The Owls were drawn against fellow EFL Championship side Bolton Wanderers on 10 August 2017.

8 August 2017 1st round	Sheffield Wednesday	4–1	Chesterfield	Owlerton, Sheffield
19:45 BST	Fletcher (yellow card) 37', (goal) 45+2'; Hooper 43'; Reach (yellow card) 49'; Bannan 75'; Hutchinson 83'	Report	Dennis 38' (pen.); McCourt (yellow card) 41'	Stadium: Hillsborough Stadium; Attendance: 11,682; Referee: Ross Joyce

22 August 2017 2nd round	Bolton Wanderers	3–2	Sheffield Wednesday	Horwich, Bolton
20:00 BST	Karacan (yellow card) 13', (goal) 64'; Dervite (yellow card) 31', (goal) 42'; Armstrong 57' (pen.)	Report	Pudil (yellow card) 18'; Rhodes 76', 83'; Bannan (yellow card) 88'	Stadium: Macron Stadium; Attendance: 6,385; Referee: David Webb

== Squad statistics ==
=== Appearances ===
As of 6 May 2018

No.	Pos	Nat	Player	Total		Championship		FA Cup		League Cup	
No.	Pos	Nat	Player	Apps	Goals	Apps	Goals	Apps	Goals	Apps	Goals
1	GK	(Republic of Ireland) IRL	Keiren Westwood	18	0	18	0	0	0	0	0
2	DF	(England) ENG	Jack Hunt	34	0	28+1	0	4	0	1	0
3	MF	(England) ENG	David Jones	33	1	21+6	1	4+1	0	1	0
4	DF	(Netherlands) NED	Joost van Aken	14	0	14	0	0	0	0	0
5	MF	(England) ENG	Kieran Lee	15	3	10+5	3	0	0	0	0
6	DF	(Wales) WAL	Morgan Fox	32	0	26+2	0	4	0	0	0
7	FW	(Scotland) SCO	Jordan Rhodes	34	7	17+13	5	1+2	0	1	2
8	MF	(England) ENG	Jacob Butterfield	23	0	12+8	0	3	0	0	0
9	FW	(Scotland) SCO	Steven Fletcher	19	3	13+5	2	0	0	1	1
10	MF	(Scotland) SCO	Barry Bannan	31	1	28+1	0	0	0	2	1
11	FW	(England) ENG	Sam Winnall	3	1	1+1	1	0	0	1	0
12	DF	(Netherlands) NED	Glenn Loovens	23	0	20	0	3	0	0	0
14	FW	(England) ENG	Gary Hooper	25	11	22+2	10	0	0	1	1
15	DF	(England) ENG	Tom Lees	31	1	28+1	1	0	0	2	0
16	DF	(Scotland) SCO	Liam Palmer	26	0	17+6	0	1+1	0	1	0
17	FW	(Kosovo) KOS	Atdhe Nuhiu	32	14	15+11	11	4	3	0+2	0
18	FW	(Portugal) POR	Lucas João	34	9	18+12	9	2+1	0	0+1	0
19	FW	(Portugal) POR	Marco Matias	14	1	2+7	0	2+1	1	0+2	0
20	MF	(England) ENG	Adam Reach	52	4	45	4	4+1	0	2	0
21	MF	(Scotland) SCO	George Boyd	25	3	13+7	2	5	1	0	0
23	DF	(England) ENG	Sam Hutchinson	9	1	7+1	0	0	0	0+1	1
24	DF	(Wales) WAL	Ash Baker	1	0	1	0	0	0	0	0
25	GK	(England) ENG	Cameron Dawson	7	0	3	0	4	0	0	0
26	DF	(England) ENG	Connor O'Grady	1	0	0	0	1	0	0	0
28	GK	(England) ENG	Joe Wildsmith	29	0	25+1	0	1	0	2	0
31	MF	(England) ENG	Connor Kirby	1	0	0+1	0	0	0	0	0
32	MF	(Netherlands) NED	Joey Pelupessy	20	1	18	1	1+1	0	0	0
33	MF	(Scotland) SCO	Ross Wallace	30	2	24+3	2	1	0	2	0
35	DF	(Denmark) DEN	Frederik Nielsen	4	0	0+3	0	1	0	0	0
36	DF	(Czech Republic) CZE	Daniel Pudil	31	0	24+2	0	3	0	2	0
38	MF	(England) ENG	Sean Clare	5	1	4+1	1	0	0	0	0
39	DF	(England) ENG	Jordan Thorniley	11	0	7+4	0	0	0	0	0
41	MF	(Switzerland) SUI	Almen Abdi	6	0	1+3	0	0	0	2	0
44	MF	(England) ENG	Jack Stobbs	3	0	2+1	0	0	0	0	0
45	FW	(Italy) ITA	Fernando Forestieri	11	5	6+4	5	0	0	1	0
46	DF	(Portugal) POR	Frederico Venâncio	25	1	20	1	5	0	0	0

=== Goalscorers ===
As of 6 May 2018

Includes all competitive matches.

Rank	Pos.	Nat.	No.	Player	Championship	FA Cup	League Cup	Total
1	FW	(Kosovo)	17	Atdhe Nuhiu	11	3	–	14
2	FW	(England)	14	Gary Hooper	10	0	1	11
3	FW	(Portugal)	18	Lucas João	9	0	–	9
4	FW	(Scotland)	7	Jordan Rhodes	5	0	2	7
5	FW	(Italy)	45	Fernando Forestieri	4	0	–	4
5	MF	(England)	20	Adam Reach	4	0	–	4
7	MF	(Scotland)	21	George Boyd	2	1	–	3
7	FW	(Scotland)	9	Steven Fletcher	2	0	1	3
7	MF	(England)	5	Kieran Lee	3	0	–	3
10	MF	(Scotland)	33	Ross Wallace	2	0	–	2
11	MF	(Scotland)	10	Barry Bannan	0	0	1	1
11	MF	(England)	38	Sean Clare	1	0	–	1
11	DF	(England)	23	Sam Hutchinson	0	0	1	1
11	MF	(England)	3	David Jones	1	0	–	1
11	DF	(England)	15	Tom Lees	1	0	0	1
11	MF	(Portugal)	19	Marco Matias	0	1	–	1
11	MF	(Netherlands)	32	Joey Pelupessy	1	0	–	1
11	FW	(England)	11	Sam Winnall	1	0	–	1
Own Goals					0	0	–	0
Total					48	5	6	59

=== Disciplinary record ===
As of 6 May 2018

No.	Pos.	Name	Championship		FA Cup		League Cup		Total	
No.	Pos.	Name	Yellow card	Red card	Yellow card	Red card	Yellow card	Red card	Yellow card	Red card
12	DF	Glenn Loovens	3	2	0	0	0	0	3	2
36	DF	Daniel Pudil	8	1	0	0	1	0	8	1
6	DF	Morgan Fox	3	1	0	0	0	0	3	1
19	FW	Marco Matias	0	1	1	0	0	0	1	1
33	MF	Ross Wallace	8	0	0	0	0	0	8	0
17	FW	Atdhe Nuhiu	7	0	0	0	0	0	7	0
20	MF	Adam Reach	7	0	0	0	0	0	7	0
2	DF	Jack Hunt	4	0	0	0	0	0	4	0
10	MF	Barry Bannan	3	0	0	0	1	0	4	0
5	MF	Kieran Lee	4	0	0	0	0	0	4	0
4	DF	Joost van Aken	4	0	0	0	0	0	4	0
8	MF	Jacob Butterfield	3	0	0	0	0	0	3	0
4	MF	Sam Hutchinson	3	0	0	0	0	0	3	0
16	DF	Liam Palmer	3	0	0	0	0	0	3	0
32	MF	Joey Pelupessy	2	0	1	0	0	0	3	0
21	MF	George Boyd	2	0	0	0	0	0	2	0
14	FW	Gary Hooper	2	0	0	0	0	0	2	0
3	MF	David Jones	2	0	0	0	0	0	2	0
39	DF	Jordan Thorniley	2	0	0	0	0	0	2	0
46	DF	Frederico Venâncio	2	0	0	0	0	0	2	0
45	FW	Fernando Forestieri	1	0	0	0	0	0	1	0
7	FW	Jordan Rhodes	1	0	0	0	0	0	1	0
28	FW	Joe Wildsmith	1	0	0	0	0	0	1	0

=== Clean sheets ===
As of 6 May 2018

No.	Nat.	Player	Matches Played	Clean Sheet %	League	FA Cup	EFL Cup	TOTAL
25	(England)	Cameron Dawson	6	66.66%	2	2	0	4
28	(England)	Joe Wildsmith	29	24.13%	6	1	0	7
1	(Republic of Ireland)	Keiren Westwood	18	20.83%	4	0	0	4
34	(England)	Jake Kean	0	0.00%	0	0	0	0

== Awards ==
=== Player of the Month ===
Player of the Month awards for the 2017–18 season.

Month	First	%	Second	%	Third	%	Ref
August	Not awarded						
September	(England) Gary Hooper	89%	(Scotland) Barry Bannan	4%	(England) Kieran Lee	3%	
October	(England) Adam Reach	42%	(Scotland) Barry Bannan	33%	(England) Gary Hooper	10%	
November	(Scotland) Barry Bannan	55%	(England) Adam Reach	20%	(Kosovo) Atdhe Nuhiu and (Republic of Ireland) Keiren Westwood	7%	
December	Not awarded						
January	(England) Joe Wildsmith	40%	(Kosovo) Atdhe Nuhiu	28%	(Portugal) Frederico Venancio	15%	
February	(Portugal) Lucas Joao	34%	(England) Adam Reach	21%	(England) Sean Clare	20%	
March	(Kosovo) Atdhe Nuhiu	85%	-	-	-	-	

=== Player of the Year ===
First	%	Second	%	Third	%	Ref
(England) Adam Reach	55%	(Kosovo) Atdhe Nuhiu	30%	(England) Joe Wildsmith	7%	
