= 2016–17 Sheffield Wednesday F.C. season =

English football club season

Sheffield Wednesday
2016–17 season
- Chairman: Dejphon Chansiri
- Head coach: Carlos Carvalhal
- EFL Championship: 4th
- FA Cup: 3rd round (Eliminated by Middlesbrough)
- League Cup: 1st round (Eliminated by Cambridge United)
- Play-offs: Semi-finals
- Top goalscorer: League: Fernando Forestieri (12); All: Fernando Forestieri (12)
- Highest home attendance: 33,861 (vs Fulham; Championship)
- Lowest home attendance: 24,151 (vs Bristol City; Championship)
- Average home league attendance: 27,129
Home colours	Away colours	Third colours

The 2016–17 season is Sheffield Wednesday's fifth consecutive season in the Championship. Along with competing in the Championship, the club will also participate in the FA Cup and League Cup.

The season covers the period from 1 July 2016 to 30 June 2017.

== Overview ==
=== August ===
Sheffield Wednesday started the 2016–17 season with a 1–0 win at home against recently relegated Aston Villa, thanks to a late Fernando Forestieri goal. The Owls' run in the League Cup did not last long as they lost 2–1 at Cambridge United after extra time, with Lucas João scoring for Sheffield Wednesday. In the next four league games The Owls managed just two points, with a 0–0 draw away to Norwich followed by a 3–1 away loss at Burton Albion, a 2–0 home loss to Leeds United and a 1–1 draw away to Brentford.

=== September ===
The Owls got off to a winning start in September with a 2–1 win over Wigan Athletic at Hillsborough. Steven Fletcher equalised for Sheffield Wednesday, scoring his first competitive goal for the club, whilst Fernando Forestieri scored the winning goal. Another home win followed with a 3–2 win over Bristol City thanks to Kieran Lee's 96th minute winning goal. The Owls' only loss in September came against Birmingham City losing 2–1 at St Andrews. This was followed by two successive victories, 2–1 at home against Nottingham Forest and 1–0 away against Blackburn Rovers.

=== October ===
The Owls lost their first game of October, a 2–1 loss at home against Brighton & Hove Albion. After the international break, Sheffield Wednesday got their first win of the month against Huddersfield Town thanks to Fernando Forestieri's 68th-minute penalty which was the only goal of the game. In the next game, a mid-week fixture, The Owls left the Cardiff City Stadium with a point after a 1–1 draw, with Daniel Pudil scoring the equalising goal. A few days later, Gary Hooper's 40th-minute goal was enough for Sheffield Wednesday to get all three points in their home game against Queens Park Rangers.

=== November ===
With only three games in November, The Owls managed four points out of a possible nine. Despite managing to equalise after just four minutes of going 1–0 down against Ipswich Town at home, Sheffield Wednesday eventually lost 2–1. The Owls drew 1–1 away against Fulham in their next game, despite leading for most of the game thanks to a goal from Fernando Forestieri after just 10 minutes. In their final game of November, Sheffield Wednesday beat Wolves 2–0 at Hillsborough, with Fernando Forestieri scoring a penalty and Kieran Lee scoring The Owls' second goal.

=== December ===
In a game which saw three players dismissed (Forestieri for The Owls and Beckford and Doyle for Preston North End), Sheffield Wednesday managed to take all three points with a 2–1 victory, with Fernando Forestieri and Steven Fletcher on the score sheet, the latter scoring from a penalty kick after on-loan winger Will Buckley was fouled in the penalty area by opposition goalkeeper Chris Maxwell. After a 2–1 away to Reading, Sheffield Wednesday won all of their next three games, with a 2–0 home win against local rivals Barnsley, a 1–0 home win against local rivals Rotherham United and a 1–0 away win against league table leaders Newcastle United, with team captain Glenn Loovens scoring the winning goal, his first for the club. In The Owls' final game of 2016, Adam Reach scored a late equaliser against Preston North End, his first goal for the club.

=== January ===
In Sheffield Wednesday's first match of 2017, the result was a 0–0 draw at Hillsborough against Wolves. This was followed by a 3–0 away defeat to Middlesbrough in the FA Cup, entering and exiting the tournament in the 3rd round. In Sheffield Wednesday's next EFL Championship match, a goal each from Ross Wallace and Fernando Forestieri (both in the second half) gave The Owls a 2–0 victory against local rivals Huddersfield Town, extending Wednesday's unbeaten run in the league to six games. This run was ended after a 2–1 away loss to Brighton & Hove Albion, which was followed by a 2–2 draw away to Bristol City.

=== February ===
The Owls got February off to a winning start, with a 1–0 win at the DW Stadium against Wigan Athletic, thanks to a Ross Wallace goal. Two home games followed, with a 3–0 win over Birmingham City followed by a 2–1 win over Blackburn Rovers. In the following game, away to Nottingham Forest, Sheffield Wednesday extended their winning run to four games after a 2–1 win, with goals from Almen Abdi (his first for the club) and Fernando Forestieri for The Owls. Wednesday would then end February with back-to-back losses, 2–1 against Brentford and 1–0 at play-off rivals Leeds United, ending the Owls four match unbeaten run in acrimonious fashion. The Owls were in sixth place with twelve games to go at the end of this month, two points behind fifth placed Reading and five ahead of seventh placed Fulham, albeit a game ahead.

=== March ===
Sheffield Wednesday got March off to a winning start in style, with a 5– home win against Norwich City, with goals from Fernando Forestieri, Morgan Fox, Ross Wallace and a brace from January signing Jordan Rhodes. It was also the club's biggest win of the season, beating the previous month's 3–0 home win against Birmingham City. A 1–1 draw at home to Burton Albion was followed by two successive 2–0 defeats, one at home to Reading and another away to Aston Villa, giving The Owls just four points out of twelve in March and losing their five-point advantage over seventh placed Fulham.

=== April ===
A 1–1 draw away at Barnsley saw The Owls drop into seventh place for the first time in ten matches, although amends were quickly made with a 2–0 victory over already relegated local rivals Rotherham United, thanks to a brace from Steven Fletcher. This result was followed by four further victories for Sheffield Wednesday, 2–1 at home against Newcastle United, 1–0 at home against Cardiff City thanks to a late Fernando Forestieri header and two successive 2–1 victories, one away to Queens Park Rangers and another at home to Derby County, with Steven Fletcher scoring his fourth goal in as many games in the latter. Following the game against Derby County, Sheffield Wednesday were in fourth place in the league table, their highest position in the whole of the 2016–17 season. The Owls remained unbeaten in April, ending the month with a 1–0 away win at Ipswich Town, with the game's solitary goal coming from Owls midfielder Kieran Lee.

=== May ===
With The Owls' play off place confirmed, after the Ipswich game, a much changed starting line up was fielded in the 2–1 home loss to Fulham. At the end of the league season, Sheffield Wednesday finished in fourth place.

== Players ==
=== Transfers in ===
Date from	Position	Nationality	Name	From	Fee	Ref.
1 July 2016	FW	(Scotland)	Steven Fletcher	Sunderland	Free transfer	
18 July 2016	GK	(England)	Jake Kean	Norwich City	Free transfer	
28 July 2016	MF	(Switzerland)	Almen Abdi	Watford	£3,000,000	
28 July 2016	DF	(Czech Republic)	Daniel Pudil	Watford	£2,000,000	
16 August 2016	CM	(England)	David Jones	Burnley	Undisclosed	
19 August 2016	CB	(France)	Vincent Sasso	Braga	Undisclosed	
31 August 2016	MF	(England)	Adam Reach	Middlesbrough	£5,000,000	
6 September 2016	DF	(Netherlands)	Urby Emanuelson	Hellas Verona	Free transfer	
6 January 2017	LB	(Wales)	Morgan Fox	Charlton Athletic	Undisclosed	
13 January 2017	FW	(England)	Sam Winnall	Barnsley	Undisclosed	

=== Transfers out ===
Date from	Position	Nationality	Name	To	Fee	Ref.
16 July 2016	GK	(Wales)	Lewis Price	Rotherham United	Free transfer	
30 August 2016	CF	(Northern Ireland)	Caolan Lavery	Sheffield United	Free transfer	
31 August 2016	DF	(Belgium)	Marnick Vermijl	Preston North End	Undisclosed	
23 September 2016	MF	(France)	Jérémy Hélan	Retired	N/A	
12 January 2017	CF	(Romania)	Sergiu Buș	Astra Giurgiu	Free transfer	

=== Loans in ===
Date from	Position	Nationality	Name	From	Date until	Ref.
5 August 2016	FW	(England)	Will Buckley	Sunderland	End of Season	
1 January 2017	FW	(England)	Callum McManaman	West Brom	End of Season	
31 January 2017	FW	(Scotland)	Jordan Rhodes	Middlesbrough	End of Season (Note: The transfer will become permanent at the end of the season)	

=== Loans out ===
Date from	Position	Nationality	Name	From	Date until	Ref.
9 August 2016	GK	(England)	Cameron Dawson	Wycombe Wanderers	16 August 2016	
19 August 2016	CB	(Curaçao)	Darryl Lachman	Willem II	End of Season	
1 January 2017	GK	(England)	Jake Kean	Mansfield Town	End of Season	
18 January 2017	DM	(Portugal)	Filipe Melo	Paços de Ferreira	End of Season	
20 January 2017	CM	(England)	Sean Clare	Accrington Stanley	End of Season	
30 January 2017	FW	(Portugal)	Lucas João	Blackburn Rovers	End of Season	
31 January 2017	RW	(Senegal)	Modou Sougou	Moreirense	End of Season	

=== Transfer summary ===
Spending

Summer: ▼£ 12,600,000

Winter: £

Total: ▼£ 12,600,000

Income

Summer: Unknown

Winter: £

Total: Unknown

Net Expenditure

Summer: ▼£ 12,600,000

Winter: £

Total: ▼£ 12,600,000

=== New contracts ===
Date from	Position	Nationality	Name	Length	Expiry	Ref.
4 July 2016	MF	(Portugal)	José Semedo	1 year	June 2017	
13 July 2016	MF	(Scotland)	Ross Wallace	2 years	June 2018	
27 July 2016	MF	(England)	Kieran Lee	3 years	June 2019	
5 August 2016	GK	(Republic of Ireland)	Keiren Westwood	3 years	June 2019	
8 August 2016	DF	(England)	Tom Lees	5 years	June 2021	
26 October 2016	DF	(Scotland)	Liam Palmer	3 years	June 2019	
10 January 2017	FW	(Italy)	Fernando Forestieri	3½ years	June 2020	
10 January 2017	MF	(England)	Sam Hutchinson	3½ years	June 2020	

=== Débuts ===
Players making their first team Sheffield Wednesday début in a competitive match.

No	Pos	Player	Date	Opponents	Ground	Ref
7	MF	(Switzerland) Almen Abdi	7 August 2016	Aston Villa	Hillsborough Stadium	
6	FW	(Scotland) Steven Fletcher	7 August 2016	Aston Villa	Hillsborough Stadium	
29	DF	(England) Connor O'Grady	9 August 2016	Cambridge United	Abbey Stadium	
38	MF	(England) Will Buckley	9 August 2016	Cambridge United	Abbey Stadium	
48	MF	(United States) James Murphy	9 August 2016	Cambridge United	Abbey Stadium	
46	FW	(England) George Hirst	9 August 2016	Cambridge United	Abbey Stadium	
3	MF	(England) David Jones	20 August 2016	Leeds United	Hillsborough Stadium	
9	MF	(England) Adam Reach	10 September 2016	Wigan Athletic	Hillsborough Stadium	
25	GK	(England) Cameron Dawson	19 October 2016	Cardiff City	Cardiff City Stadium	
10	MF	(England) Callum McManaman	2 January 2017	Wolverhampton Wanderers	Hillsborough Stadium	
11	FW	(England) Sam Winnall	14 January 2017	Huddersfield Town	Hillsborough Stadium	
43	DF	(Wales) Morgan Fox	31 January 2017	Bristol City	Ashton Gate	|-
17	FW	(England) Jordan Rhodes	3 February 2017	Wigan Athletic	DW Stadium	
26	DF	(Netherlands) Urby Emanuelson	7 May 2017	Fulham	Hillsborough Stadium	

== Competitions ==
=== Pre-season friendlies ===
Sheffield Wednesday played five friendly games as part of their pre-season.

13 July 2016 Friendly	Alfreton Town	1–1	Sheffield Wednesday	Alfreton
19:30 BST	Clayton 90'	Report	Bannan 56'	Stadium: Impact Arena; Attendance: 1,176; Referee: Jamie O'Connor

16 July 2016 Friendly	Chesterfield	0–2	Sheffield Wednesday	Chesterfield
13:00 BST			Lee 9'; Forestieri 28'	Stadium: Proact Stadium; Attendance: 4,063; Referee: Mark Haywood

20 July 2016 Friendly	Sheffield Wednesday	1–0	Benfica	Owlerton, Sheffield
19:30 BST	Forestieri 23'	Report		Stadium: Hillsborough; Attendance: 12,207; Referee: Andrew Madley

24 July 2016 Friendly	Nacional	0–4	Sheffield Wednesday	Albufeira, Portugal
20:00 BST		Report	Forestieri 44'; Hooper 67', 72'; Fletcher 87'	Stadium: Estádio Municipal de Albufeira; Referee: Fernando Santos

31 July 2016 Friendly	Sheffield Wednesday	3–0	Port Vale	Owlerton, Sheffield
16:30 BST	Lees 19'; Forestieri 51'; Abdi 57'	Report		Stadium: Hillsborough; Attendance: 6,711; Referee: Craig Pawson

=== Championship ===
Sheffield Wednesday will compete in the Football League Championship for the 2016–17 season.

==== League table ====
Pos	Team	Pld	W	D	L	GF	GA	GD	Pts	Promotion, qualification or relegation
2	Brighton & Hove Albion (P)	46	28	9	9	74	40	+34	93	Promotion to the Premier League
3	Reading	46	26	7	13	68	64	+4	85	Qualification for the Championship play-offs (Note: Four teams play for one spot and promotion to the Premier League.)
4	Sheffield Wednesday	46	24	9	13	60	45	+15	81	Qualification for the Championship play-offs
5	Huddersfield Town (O, P)	46	25	6	15	56	58	−2	81	Qualification for the Championship play-offs
6	Fulham	46	22	14	10	85	57	+28	80	Qualification for the Championship play-offs

Source: English Football League, Soccerway
Rules for classification: 1) Points; 2) Goal difference; 3) Number of goals scored; 4) Points in head-to-head matches; 5) Goal difference in head-to-head matches; 6) Goals scored in head-to-head matches; 7) Play-off.
(O) Play-off winners; (P) Promoted

==== Results summary ====
Overall								Home						Away					
Pld	W	D	L	GF	GA	GD	Pts	W	D	L	GF	GA	GD	W	D	L	GF	GA	GD
46	24	9	13	60	45	+15	81	15	2	6	36	22	+14	9	7	7	24	23	+1

Last updated: 7 May 2017.

==== Results by round ====
Matchday	1	2	3	4	5	6	7	8	9	10	11	12	13	14	15	16	17	18	19	20	21	22	23	24	25	26	27	28	29	30	31	32	33	34	35	36	37	38	39	40	41	42	43	44	45	46
Ground	H	A	A	H	A	H	H	A	H	A	H	A	A	H	A	H	A	A	H	A	H	H	A	A	H	H	A	A	A	H	H	A	H	A	H	H	A	H	A	A	H	H	A	H	A	H
Result	W	D	L	L	D	W	W	L	W	W	L	W	D	W	L	L	D	W	W	L	W	W	W	D	D	W	L	D	W	W	W	W	L	L	W	D	L	L	D	W	W	W	W	W	W	L
Position	9	8	14	17	19	16	9	14	11	7	9	7	6	5	7	10	9	6	5	6	6	6	6	6	6	6	6	7	6	6	6	6	6	6	6	6	6	6	7	6	6	6	5	4	4	4

Updated to match(es) played on 7 May 2017. Source: BBC Sport
A = Away; H = Home; W = Win; D = Draw; L = Loss

All fixtures are subject to change.

==== Matches ====
===== August =====
7 August 2016 1	Sheffield Wednesday	1–0	Aston Villa	Owlerton, Sheffield
16:30 BST	Hutchinson (yellow card) 30'; Wallace (yellow card) 45'; Lees (yellow card) 45+4'; Forestieri 85'	Report	Elphick (yellow card) 41'; Gardner (yellow card) 45+5'; Baker (yellow card) 66'	Stadium: Hillsborough; Attendance: 30,060 (4,494 away); Referee: Stephen Martin
Note: Live on Sky Sports

13 August 2016 2	Norwich City	0–0	Sheffield Wednesday	Norwich
17:30 BST	Bennett (yellow card) 55'	Report	Abdi (yellow card) 64'	Stadium: Carrow Road; Attendance: 26,236 (1,608 away); Referee: Andy Woolmer

16 August 2016 3	Burton Albion	3–1	Sheffield Wednesday	Burton upon Trent
19:45 BST	McFadzean 7'; Irvine 45+2'; Dyer 77'; Turner (yellow card) 90'	Report	Hunt (yellow card) 7'; Hooper 12' (pen.)	Stadium: Pirelli Stadium; Attendance: 4,997 (1,739 away); Referee: Neil Swarbrick

20 August 2016 4	Sheffield Wednesday	0–2	Leeds United	Owlerton, Sheffield
12:30 BST	Bannan (yellow card) 40'	Report	Vieira (yellow card) 60'; Antonsson 63'; Bridcutt (yellow card) 79'; Wood 85'	Stadium: Hillsborough; Attendance: 29,075 (3,887 away); Referee: Simon Hooper

27 August 2016 5	Brentford	1–1	Sheffield Wednesday	Brentford, W. London
15:00 BST	Vibe (yellow card) 41' (yellow-red card) 88' (goal) 54'; Sawyers (yellow card) 52'; Dean (yellow card) 90+4'	Report	Jones (yellow card) 61' (yellow-red card) 73'; Hutchinson 90+2'	Stadium: Griffin Park; Attendance: 9,677 (1,650 away)

===== September =====
10 September 2016 6	Sheffield Wednesday	2–1	Wigan Athletic	Owlerton, Sheffield
15:00 BST	Fletcher 29'; Forestieri (yellow card) 34', (goal) 62'	Report	Power (yellow card) 3'; Grigg 5'; Garbutt (yellow card) 23'; Jacobs (yellow card) 73'	Stadium: Hillsborough; Attendance: 24,860 (885 away); Referee: David Coote

13 September 2016 7	Sheffield Wednesday	3–2	Bristol City	Owlerton, Sheffield
19:45 BST	Fletcher 52'; Hutchinson (red card) 59'; Bannan 75'; Lee 90+6', (yellow card) 90+7'	Report	Abraham 33', 39'; O'Neil (yellow card) 42' (red card) 61'; Flint (yellow card) 61'	Stadium: Hillsborough; Attendance: 24,151 (407 away); Referee: Darren Bond

17 September 2016 8	Birmingham City	2–1	Sheffield Wednesday	Bordesley, Birmingham
17:30 BST	Gleeson (yellow card) 50'; Donaldson 81' (pen.); Jutkiewicz 90+2'	Report	Loovens (yellow card) 56'; Hooper 76'; Westwood (yellow card) 80'	Stadium: St Andrew's; Attendance: 16,786 (2,134 away); Referee: Scott Duncan

24 September 2016 9	Sheffield Wednesday	2–1	Nottingham Forest	Owlerton, Sheffield
15:00 BST	Lee 68', 90+1'; Abdi (yellow card) 90+4'	Report	Lansbury 35', (yellow card) 90+6'; Osborn (yellow card) 90+2'; Lichaj (yellow card) 90+7'	Stadium: Hillsborough; Attendance: 27,350 (2,617 away); Referee: Kevin Friend

27 September 2016 10	Blackburn Rovers	0–1	Sheffield Wednesday	Blackburn
19:45 BST		Report	Fletcher 22'	Stadium: Ewood Park; Attendance: 12,844 (2,752 away); Referee: Simon Hooper

===== October =====
1 October 2016 11	Sheffield Wednesday	1–2	Brighton & Hove Albion	Owlerton, Sheffield
15:00 BST	Hooper 90+5'	Report	Baldock 26', (yellow card) 63'; Duffy (yellow card) 35'; Bruno (yellow card) 51'; Knockaert 73', (yellow card) 74'	Stadium: Hillsborough; Attendance: 25,605 (691 away); Referee: Oliver Langford

16 October 2016 12	Huddersfield Town	0–1	Sheffield Wednesday	Huddersfield
12:00 BST	Kachunga (yellow card) 38'	Report	Forestieri 68' (pen.); Hooper (yellow card) 70'; Hutchinson (yellow card) 73'	Stadium: John Smith's Stadium; Attendance: 22,368 (2,000 away); Referee: Graham Scott

19 October 2016 13	Cardiff City	1–1	Sheffield Wednesday	Leckwith, Cardiff
19:45 BST	Whittingham 9'; Morrison (yellow card) 39'	Report	Lee (yellow card) 45'; Pudil 55'	Stadium: Cardiff City Stadium; Attendance: 15,887 (1,020 away); Referee: Darren Bond

22 October 2016 14	Sheffield Wednesday	1–0	Queens Park Rangers	Owlerton, Sheffield
15:00 BST	Hooper 40'; Pudil (yellow card) 77'	Report	Borysiuk (yellow card) 13'; Gladwin (yellow card) 17'; Onuoha (yellow card) 85'; Hamalainen (yellow card) 90+1'	Stadium: Hillsborough; Attendance: 25,903 (542 away); Referee: Chris Kavanagh

29 October 2016 15	Derby County	2–0	Sheffield Wednesday	Pride Park, Derby
15:00 BST	Christie 17'; Pearce 67'; Ince (yellow card) 82'	Report	Palmer (yellow card) 51'; Hutchinson (yellow card) 66'; Nuhiu (yellow card) 90+1'	Stadium: Pride Park Stadium; Attendance: 30,064 (3,104 away); Referee: James Linington

===== November =====
5 November 2016 16	Sheffield Wednesday	1–2	Ipswich Town	Owlerton, Sheffield
15:00 GMT	Hooper 36'; Fletcher (yellow card) 59'	Report	Lawrence 32'; Chambers (yellow card) 56', (goal) 87'; Ward (yellow card) 88'	Stadium: Hillsborough; Attendance: 25,851 (656 away); Referee: Andy Madley

19 November 2016 17	Fulham	1–1	Sheffield Wednesday	Fulham, S. W. London
15:00 GMT	Johansen (yellow card) 34'; Parker (yellow card) 79'; Malone 90+1'	Report	Forestieri 10'; Hutchinson (yellow card) 27'; Wallace (yellow card) 41'; Fletcher (yellow card) 82'	Stadium: Craven Cottage; Attendance: 20,255 (3,884 away); Referee: Geoff Eltringham

26 November 2016 18	Wolverhampton Wanderers	0–2	Sheffield Wednesday	Wolverhampton
15:00 GMT	Iorfa (yellow card) 59'; Price (yellow card) 90+1'	Report	Forestieri 15' (pen.); Lee 29'; Reach (yellow card) 90+1'	Stadium: Molineux Stadium; Attendance: 27,293 (2,416 away); Referee: Jeremy Simpson

===== December =====
3 December 2016 19	Sheffield Wednesday	2–1	Preston North End	Owlerton, Sheffield
15:00 GMT	Forestieri 9', (red card) 65'; Lee (yellow card) 58'; Fletcher 79' (pen.)	Report	Doyle 82', (red card) 90'; Beckford (red card) 90'	Stadium: Hillsborough; Attendance: 24,843 (801 away); Referee: Scott Duncan

10 December 2016 20	Reading	2–1	Sheffield Wednesday	Reading
15:00 GMT	Evans (yellow card) 44'; Van den Berg (yellow card) 48'; Beerens 57', 76'; McShane (yellow card) 80'	Report	Nuhiu (yellow card) 29'; Lee (yellow card) 72'; Hutchinson (yellow card) 73'; Wallace (yellow card) 79'; Loovens (yellow card) 80'; Fletcher 90+2'	Stadium: Madejski Stadium; Attendance: 18,153 (2,296 away); Referee: Tony Harrington

13 December 2016 21	Sheffield Wednesday	2–0	Barnsley	Owlerton, Sheffield
19:45 GMT	MacDonald 37' (o.g.); Bannan (yellow card) 45+1'; João (yellow card) 50'; Hutchinson 80'	Report	Morsy (yellow card) 40'; Hammill (red card) 82'	Stadium: Hillsborough; Attendance: 27,248 (2,618 away); Referee: Peter Bankes

17 December 2016 22	Sheffield Wednesday	1–0	Rotherham United	Owlerton, Sheffield
15:00 GMT	Fletcher (yellow card) 55', (goal) 90+4' (pen.)	Report	Fisher (yellow card) 86'; Mattock (yellow card) 90+3'; Wood (red card) 90+3'	Stadium: Hillsborough; Attendance: 27,242 (1,113 away); Referee: Tim Robinson

26 December 2016 23	Newcastle United	0–1	Sheffield Wednesday	Newcastle upon Tyne
19:45 GMT	Hayden (yellow card) 52'	Report	Bannan (yellow card) 30'; Pudil (yellow card) 35'; Loovens 53'; Reach (yellow card) 70'; Hutchinson (yellow card) 76'; Wallace (yellow card) 85'; Palmer (yellow card) 90+5'	Stadium: St James' Park; Attendance: 52,179 (3,086 away); Referee: Paul Tierney

31 December 2016 24	Preston North End	1–1	Sheffield Wednesday	Deepdale, Preston
15:00 GMT	Pearson (yellow card) 75'; Hutchinson 77' (o.g.)	Report	Fletcher (yellow card) 73'; Reach 90+4'	Stadium: Deepdale; Attendance: 14,802 (4,408 away); Referee: Andy Woolmer

===== January =====
2 January 2017 25	Sheffield Wednesday	0–0	Wolverhampton Wanderers	Owlerton, Sheffield
15:00 GMT	Hutchinson (yellow card) 60'	Report		Stadium: Hillsborough; Attendance: 30,549 (1,021 away); Referee: Simon Hooper

14 January 2017 26	Sheffield Wednesday	2–0	Huddersfield Town	Owlerton, Sheffield
15:00 GMT	Pudil (yellow card) 43'; Wallace 54'; Forestieri 90+2'	Report	Payne (red card) 70'	Stadium: Hillsborough; Attendance: 28,173 (2,842 away); Referee: Graham Scott

20 January 2017 27	Brighton & Hove Albion	2–1	Sheffield Wednesday	Falmer, Brighton
19:45 GMT	Pocognoli (yellow card) 29'; Knockaert 34', 85'; Murray (red card) 64'	Report	Dunk 45' (o.g.); Hutchinson (yellow card) 53' (yellow-red card) 90+6'; Lees (yellow card) 80'; Wallace (yellow card) 87'; Fletcher (red card) 89'	Stadium: Falmer Stadium; Attendance: 27,162 (1,139 away); Referee: Stuart Attwell

31 January 2017 28	Bristol City	2–2	Sheffield Wednesday	Ashton Gate, Bristol
19:45 GMT	Tomlin 31' (pen.); Abraham 70'	Report	Forestieri 17'; Loovens (yellow card) 34'; Lees (yellow card) 37'; Bannan (yellow card) 45+3'; Wallace 51'; Reach (yellow card) 75'	Stadium: Ashton Gate Stadium; Attendance: 17,438 (1,421 away); Referee: Oliver Langford

===== February =====
3 February 2017 29	Wigan Athletic	0–1	Sheffield Wednesday	Wigan, Greater Manchester
19:45 GMT	Morsy (yellow card) 85'	Report	Wallace 43'; Hunt (yellow card) 62'	Stadium: DW Stadium; Attendance: 13,037 (2,548 away); Referee: Steve Martin

10 February 2017 30	Sheffield Wednesday	3–0	Birmingham City	Owlerton, Sheffield
19:45 GMT	Rhodes 9'; Winnall 80'; Reach 86'	Report	Kieftenbeld (yellow card) 59'; Davis (yellow card) 61'; Robinson (yellow card) 87'	Stadium: Hillsborough Stadium; Attendance: 24,805 (978 away); Referee: Christopher Kavanagh

14 February 2017 31	Sheffield Wednesday	2–1	Blackburn Rovers	Owlerton, Sheffield
19:45 GMT	Sasso 18', 44'; Hutchinson (yellow card) 33'; Bannan (yellow card) 45+4'; Reach (yellow card) 89'	Report	Graham 20'; Akpan (red card) 86'; Bennett (yellow card) 90+2'	Stadium: Hillsborough Stadium; Attendance: 24,603 (341 away); Referee: Scott Duncan

18 February 2017 32	Nottingham Forest	1–2	Sheffield Wednesday	West Bridgford
15:00 GMT	Lichaj (yellow card) 32'; Ward (yellow card) 57'; Osborn 60'; Fox (yellow card) 90+5'	Report	Westwood (yellow card) 26'; Abdi 28', (yellow card) 30'; Forestieri 52', (yellow card) 53'; Hunt (yellow card) 78'	Stadium: City Ground; Attendance: 20,164 (1,922 away); Referee: Andy Madley

21 February 2017 33	Sheffield Wednesday	1–2	Brentford	Owlerton, Sheffield
19:45 GMT	Forestieri (yellow card) 41', (goal) 90+3'	Report	Egan 35'; Dean 44', (yellow card) 90+4'; Yennaris (yellow card) 84'	Stadium: Hillsborough; Attendance: 25,014 (153 away); Referee: Darren Bond

25 February 2017 34	Leeds United	1–0	Sheffield Wednesday	Leeds
12:30 GMT	Wood 24', (yellow card) 90+2'; Jansson (yellow card) 41'; Doukara (yellow card) 53'; O'Kane (yellow card) 70'; Bridcutt (yellow card) 87'	Report	Sasso (yellow card) 31'; Wallace (yellow card) 63'	Stadium: Elland Road; Attendance: 35,093 (2,746 away); Referee: Mike Jones

===== March =====
4 March 2017 35	Sheffield Wednesday	5–1	Norwich City	Owlerton, Sheffield
15:00 GMT	Wallace 15'; Rhodes 22', 54'; Fox 41'; Forestieri 66'	Report	Jerome 38'; Klose (yellow card) 46'; Naismith (yellow card) 56'	Stadium: Hillsborough Stadium; Attendance: 28,178 (1,736 away); Referee: Andy Davies

7 March 2017 36	Sheffield Wednesday	1–1	Burton Albion	Owlerton, Sheffield
19:45 GMT	Wallace 16'	Report	Irvine 24'; McFadzean (yellow card) 52'	Stadium: Hillsborough Stadium; Attendance: 24,929 (223 away); Referee: Peter Bankes

11 March 2017 37	Aston Villa	2–0	Sheffield Wednesday	Aston, Birmingham
15:00 GMT	Baker (yellow card) 4'; Amavi (yellow card) 32'; Kodjia 34', 79'; Hourihane (yellow card) 76'	Report	Loovens (yellow card) 18'; Sasso (red card) 48'	Stadium: Villa Park; Attendance: 31,143 (2,764 away); Referee: Lee Probert

17 March 2017 38	Sheffield Wednesday	0–2	Reading	Owlerton, Sheffield
19:45 GMT		Report	Kermorgant 13'; Blackett (yellow card) 25'; Obita (yellow card) 64'; Popa 90+4'	Stadium: Hillsborough; Attendance: 26,072 (443 away); Referee: Geoff Eltringham

===== April =====
1 April 2017 39	Barnsley	1–1	Sheffield Wednesday	Barnsley
15:00 BST	Hammill (yellow card) 61'; Kent (yellow card) 76'; MacDonald 90+3', (yellow card) 90+4'	Report	Winnall 50', (yellow card) 75'; Reach (yellow card) 90+1'; Jack Hunt (yellow card) 90+2'	Stadium: Oakwell; Attendance: 18,003 (5,009 away); Referee: Kevin Friend

4 April 2017 40	Rotherham United	0–2	Sheffield Wednesday	Rotherham
19:45 BST	Vaulks (yellow card) 64'; Newell (yellow card) 76'	Report	Fletcher 19', 44'	Stadium: New York Stadium; Attendance: 10,669 (2,573 away); Referee: Tony Harrington

8 April 2017 41	Sheffield Wednesday	2–1	Newcastle United	Owlerton, Sheffield
17:30 BST	Bannan (yellow card) 18'; Lees 59'; Fletcher 68'; Wallace (yellow card) 70'	Report	Diamé (yellow card) 44'; Shelvey 88'	Stadium: Hillsborough Stadium; Attendance: 28,883 (3,100 away); Referee: Stuart Attwell

14 April 2017 42	Sheffield Wednesday	1–0	Cardiff City	Owlerton, Sheffield
15:00 BST	Forestieri 84'	Report	Hoilett (yellow card) 42'	Stadium: Hillsborough Stadium; Attendance: 28,007 (361 away); Referee: David Coote

17 April 2017 43	Queens Park Rangers	1–2	Sheffield Wednesday	Shepherd's Bush, London
15:00 BST	Sylla 20'; Perch (yellow card) 76'	Report	Reach 12', (yellow card) 61'; Pudil 31'	Stadium: Loftus Road; Attendance: 15,708 (3,198 away); Referee: Andy Davies

22 April 2017 44	Sheffield Wednesday	2–1	Derby County	Owlerton, Sheffield
15:00 BST	Reach (yellow card) 53'; Fletcher 58'; Hooper 64'	Report	Bent 48'; Hughes (yellow card) 57'	Stadium: Hillsborough Stadium; Attendance: 28,889 (1,623 away); Referee: Paul Tierney

29 April 2017 45	Ipswich Town	0–1	Sheffield Wednesday	Ipswich
15:00 BST	Skuse (yellow card) 39'	Report	Lee 77'	Stadium: Portman Road; Attendance: 19,000 (2,003 away); Referee: James Adcock

===== May =====
7 May 2017 46	Sheffield Wednesday	1–2	Fulham	Owlerton, Sheffield
13:30 BST	Winnall 9'; Matias (red card) 45+1'	Report	Kebano 25', 79'; Kalas (yellow card) 59'	Stadium: Hillsborough Stadium; Attendance: 33,861 (3,716 away); Referee: Graham Scott

==== Play-offs ====
As a result of The Owls finishing in fourth place, they qualified for the play-offs for the second consecutive season. In the play-off semi finals, Sheffield Wednesday played against fifth-placed local rivals Huddersfield Town.

14 May 2017 Semi final (1st leg)	Huddersfield Town	0–0	Sheffield Wednesday	Huddersfield
12:00 BST	Smith (yellow card) 28'	Report	Wallace (yellow card) 34'; Hunt (yellow card) 61'; Jones (yellow card) 74'; Reach (yellow card) 90'	Stadium: John Smith's Stadium; Attendance: 20,357; Referee: Paul Tierney

17 May 2017 Semi final (2nd leg)	Sheffield Wednesday	1–1 (a.e.t.) (1–1 agg.) (3–4 p)	Huddersfield Town	Owlerton, Sheffield
19:45 BST	Hutchinson (yellow card) 24'; Fletcher 51'; Bannan (yellow card) 87'	Report	Hogg (yellow card) 44'; Hefele (yellow card) 63'; Lees 73' (o.g.)	Stadium: Hillsborough; Attendance: 32,625; Referee: Andre Marriner
	Penalties
	Hutchinson (penalty missed); Bannan (penalty scored); Lee (penalty scored); Hunt (penalty scored); Forestieri (penalty missed)		Löwe (penalty scored); Hefele (penalty scored); Wells (penalty scored); Mooy (penalty scored); Payne (penalty missed)

=== EFL Cup ===
Sheffield Wednesday competed in the 2016–17 EFL Cup for one round. They were eliminated 2–1 by Cambridge United.

9 August 2016 1st round	Cambridge United	2–1 (a.e.t.)	Sheffield Wednesday	Cambridge
19:45 BST	Mingoia 90+1'; Maris (yellow card) 90+4'; Berry 118'	Report	João 52'; Hélan (yellow card) 105'	Stadium: Abbey Stadium; Attendance: 4,170; Referee: Keith Stroud

=== FA Cup ===
Sheffield Wednesday entered the FA Cup in the third round, where they lost to Middlesbrough.

8 January 2017 3rd round	Middlesbrough	3–0	Sheffield Wednesday	Middlesbrough
15:00 BST	Negredo (yellow card) 23', (goal) 67'; De Roon (yellow card) 48', (goal) 90+1'; Leadbitter 58', (yellow card) 60'; Ayala (red card) 59'	Report	Fletcher (yellow card) 27'; Bannan (yellow card) 57'	Stadium: Riverside Stadium; Attendance: 23,661; Referee: David Coote

=== Overview ===
Competition	Record							
Competition	G	W	D	L	GF	GA	GD	Win %
Championship	46	24	9	13	60	45	+15	52.17
FA Cup	1	0	0	1	0	3	−3	0.00
League Cup	1	0	0	1	1	2	−1	0.00
Total	48	24	9	15	61	50	+11	50.00

Updated to match played 22 April 2017
Source: Competitions

== Squad statistics ==
=== Appearances ===
As of 14 May 2017

No.	Pos	Nat	Player	Total		Championship		FA Cup		League Cup	
No.	Pos	Nat	Player	Apps	Goals	Apps	Goals	Apps	Goals	Apps	Goals
1	GK	(Republic of Ireland) IRL	Keiren Westwood	44	0	44	0	0	0	0	0
2	GK	(England) ENG	Joe Wildsmith	3	0	1	0	1	0	1	0
3	MF	(England) ENG	David Jones	30	0	22+7	0	1	0	0	0
5	MF	(England) ENG	Kieran Lee	27	4	27	4	0	0	0	0
6	FW	(Scotland) SCO	Steven Fletcher	36	10	23+12	10	1	0	0	0
7	MF	(Switzerland) SUI	Almen Abdi	16	1	11+5	1	0	0	0	0
9	MF	(England) ENG	Adam Reach	41	3	37+3	3	1	0	0	0
10	MF	(England) ENG	Callum McManaman	11	0	2+8	0	0+1	0	0	0
11	FW	(England) ENG	Sam Winnall	15	3	10+5	3	0	0	0	0
12	DF	(Netherlands) NED	Glenn Loovens	33	1	30+2	1	1	0	0	0
14	FW	(England) ENG	Gary Hooper	24	6	17+6	6	0	0	0+1	0
15	DF	(England) ENG	Tom Lees	37	1	36	1	1	0	0	0
16	DF	(Scotland) SCO	Liam Palmer	23	0	15+6	0	1	0	1	0
17	FW	(Scotland) SCO	Jordan Rhodes	17	3	13+4	3	0	0	0	0
21	MF	(Portugal) POR	Marco Matias	2	0	1+1	0	0	0	0	0
23	DF	(England) ENG	Sam Hutchinson	33	2	33	2	0	0	0	0
24	MF	(Portugal) POR	José Semedo	9	0	2+6	0	0	0	1	0
25	GK	(England) ENG	Cameron Dawson	4	0	2+2	0	0	0	0	0
26	DF	(Netherlands) NED	Urby Emanuelson	1	0	0+1	0	0	0	0	0
29	DF	(England) ENG	Connor O'Grady	1	0	0	0	0	0	1	0
32	DF	(England) ENG	Jack Hunt	33	0	33	0	0	0	0	0
33	MF	(Scotland) SCO	Ross Wallace	44	5	35+7	5	1	0	1	0
36	DF	(Czech Republic) CZE	Daniel Pudil	28	2	27	2	1	0	0	0
38	MF	(England) ENG	Will Buckley	12	0	2+9	0	0	0	1	0
39	DF	(France) FRA	Vincent Sasso	14	2	12+2	2	0	0	0	0
41	MF	(Scotland) SCO	Barry Bannan	45	1	43+1	1	1	0	0	0
43	DF	(Wales) WAL	Morgan Fox	10	1	10	1	0	0	0	0
44	FW	(Kosovo) KOS	Atdhe Nuhiu	21	0	2+17	0	0+1	0	1	0
45	FW	(Italy) ITA	Fernando Forestieri	36	12	26+9	12	1	0	0	0
46	FW	(England) ENG	George Hirst	2	0	1	0	0	0	0+1	0
48	MF	(United States) USA	James Murphy	1	0	0	0	0	0	0+1	0
Players currently out on loan
8	MF	(Senegal) SEN	Modou Sougou	1	0	0	0	0	0	1	0
19	FW	(Portugal) POR	Lucas João	12	1	10	0	0+1	0	1	1
Players no longer at the club
17	MF	(France) FRA	Jérémy Hélan	1	0	0	0	0	0	1	0
42	DF	(Belgium) BEL	Marnick Vermijl	1	0	0	0	0	0	1	0

=== Goalscorers ===
As of 7 May 2017

Includes all competitive matches.

Rank	Pos.	Nat.	No.	Player	Championship	FA Cup	League Cup	Total
1	FW	(Italy)	45	Fernando Forestieri	12	–	–	12
2	FW	(Scotland)	6	Steven Fletcher	10	–	–	10
3	FW	(England)	14	Gary Hooper	6	–	–	6
4	MF	(Scotland)	33	Ross Wallace	5	–	–	5
5	MF	(England)	5	Kieran Lee	4	–	–	4
6	MF	(England)	9	Adam Reach	3	–	–	3
6	FW	(Scotland)	17	Jordan Rhodes	3	–	–	3
6	FW	(England)	11	Sam Winnall	3	–	–	3
8	MF	(England)	23	Sam Hutchinson	2	–	–	2
8	DF	(Czech Republic)	36	Daniel Pudil	2	–	–	2
8	DF	(France)	39	Vincent Sasso	2	–	–	2
12	MF	(Switzerland)	7	Almen Abdi	1	–	–	1
12	MF	(Scotland)	41	Barry Bannan	1	–	–	1
12	DF	(Wales)	43	Morgan Fox	1	–	–	1
12	FW	(Portugal)	19	Lucas João	–	–	1	1
12	DF	(England)	15	Tom Lees	1	–	–	1
12	DF	(Netherlands)	12	Glenn Loovens	1	–	–	1
Own Goals					3	–	–	3
Total					60	–	1	61

=== Disciplinary record ===
As of 14 May 2017

No.	Pos.	Name	Championship		FA Cup		League Cup		Total	
No.	Pos.	Name	Yellow card	Red card	Yellow card	Red card	Yellow card	Red card	Yellow card	Red card
23	MF	Sam Hutchinson	8	2	0	0	0	0	8	2
6	FW	Steven Fletcher	3	1	1	0	0	0	4	1
45	FW	Fernando Forestieri	3	1	0	0	0	0	3	1
3	MF	David Jones	2	1	0	0	0	0	2	1
21	MF	Marco Matias	0	1	0	0	0	0	0	1
9	MF	Adam Reach	8	0	0	0	0	0	8	0
33	MF	Ross Wallace	7	0	0	0	0	0	7	0
41	MF	Barry Bannan	6	0	1	0	0	0	6	0
32	DF	Jack Hunt	5	0	0	0	0	0	5	0
5	MF	Kieran Lee	4	0	0	0	0	0	4	0
7	MF	Almen Abdi	3	0	0	0	0	0	3	0
15	DF	Tom Lees	3	0	0	0	0	0	3	0
12	DF	Glenn Loovens	3	0	0	0	0	0	3	0
36	DF	Daniel Pudil	3	0	0	0	0	0	3	0
44	FW	Atdhe Nuhiu	2	0	0	0	0	0	2	0
16	DF	Liam Palmer	2	0	0	0	0	0	2	0
1	GK	Keiren Westwood	2	0	0	0	0	0	2	0
17	MF	Jérémy Hélan	0	0	0	0	1	0	1	0
14	FW	Gary Hooper	1	0	0	0	0	0	1	0
19	FW	Lucas João	1	0	0	0	0	0	1	0
39	DF	Vincent Sasso	1	0	0	0	0	0	1	0
11	FW	Sam Winnall	1	0	0	0	0	0	1	0

=== Clean sheets ===
As of 14 May 2017

No.	Nat.	Player	Matches Played	Clean Sheet %	League	FA Cup	EFL Cup	TOTAL
1	(Republic of Ireland)	Keiren Westwood	43	34.88%	15	0	0	14
2	(England)	Joe Wildsmith	3	0.00%	0	0	0	0
25	(England)	Cameron Dawson	4	50.00%	2	0	0	2
34	(England)	Jake Kean	0	0.00%	0	0	0	0

== Awards ==
=== Player of the Month ===
Player of the Month awards for the 2016–17 season.

Month	First	%	Second	%	Third	%	Ref
August	(England) Sam Hutchinson	62%	N/A	–	N/A	–	
September	(England) Kieran Lee	70%	(Scotland) Steven Fletcher	22%	N/A	–	
October	(England) Sam Hutchinson	25%	(England) Adam Reach	16%	(England) Gary Hooper	14%	
November	(Italy) Fernando Forestieri	64%	(England) Sam Hutchinson	12%	(England) Kieran Lee	11%	
December	(England) Sam Hutchinson	85%	N/A	–	N/A	–	
January	(Scotland) Ross Wallace	41%	(Italy) Fernando Forestieri	13%	(England) Adam Reach	11%	
February	(Italy) Fernando Forestieri	37%	(England) Sam Hutchinson	16%	(Republic of Ireland) Keiren Westwood	14%	
March	(Scotland) Ross Wallace	40%	(Wales) Morgan Fox	11%	(Scotland) Jordan Rhodes	10%	

=== EFL Team of the Week ===
Two Sheffield Wednesday players have been in the EFL Team of the Week during the 2016–17 season.

- Midfielder: (England) Kieran Lee (26 September 2016)
- Midfielder: (England) Sam Hutchinson (28 December 2016)

=== EFL Team of 2016 ===
One Sheffield Wednesday player was in the EFL Team of 2016.

- Goalkeeper: (Republic of Ireland) Keiren Westwood

=== League Managers Association Performance of the Week ===
Sheffield Wednesday won this award once during the 2016–17 season.

- EFL Championship: Newcastle United 0–1 Sheffield Wednesday (26 December 2016)
