= Atdhe Nuhiu =

Kosovan footballer (born 1989)

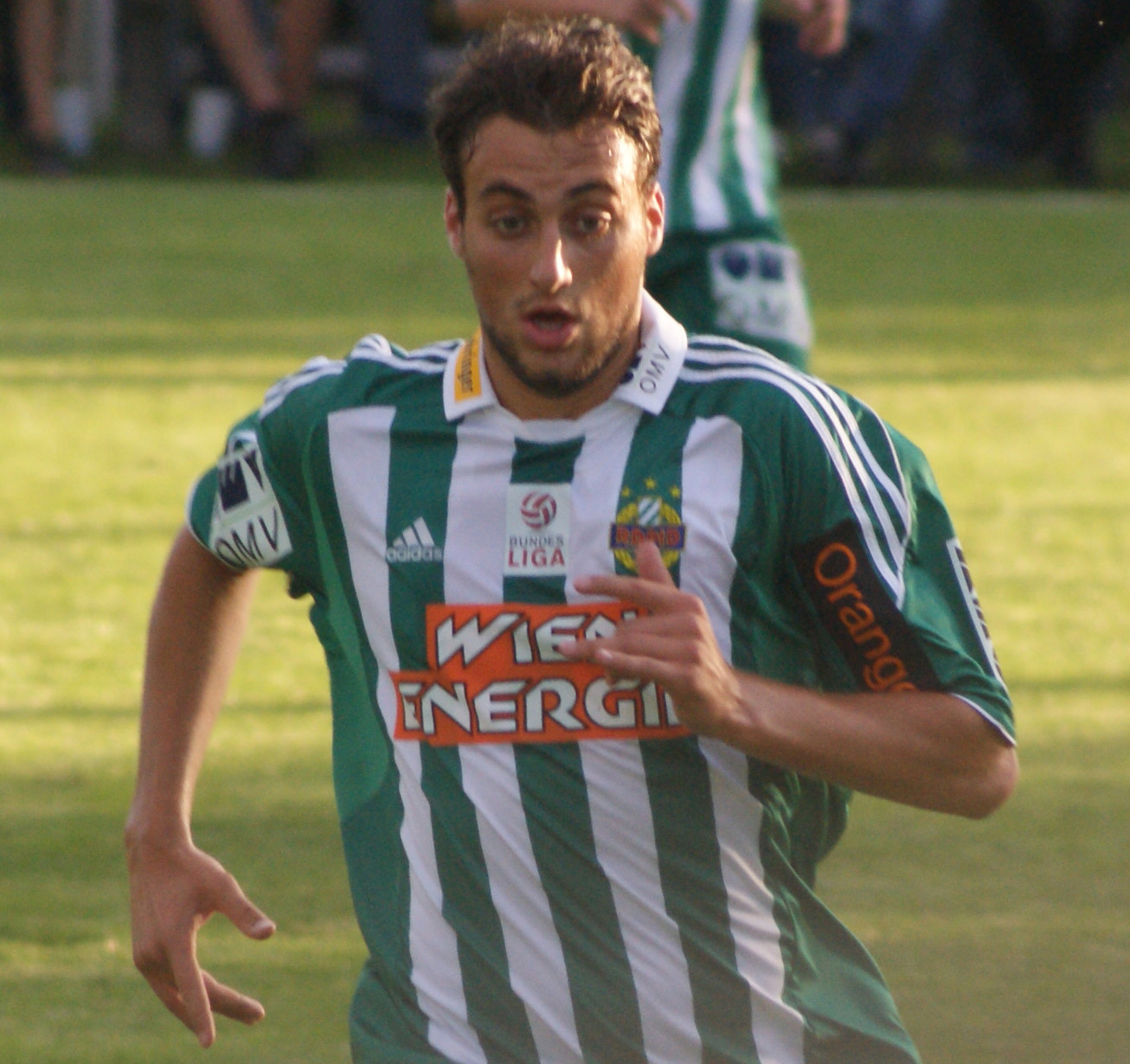
- Nuhiu with Rapid Wien in 2010

Personal information
- Full name: Atdhe Nuhiu
- Date of birth: 29 July 1989 (age 37)
- Place of birth: Pristina, SAP Kosovo, SFR Yugoslavia
- Height: 1.98 m (6 ft 6 in)
- Position: Forward

Team information
- Current team: SCR Altach (assistant); Kosovo (assistant)

Youth career
- 1995–1999: SU Ried im Traunkreis
- 1999–2005: FC Wels

Senior career*
| Years | Team | Apps | (Gls) |
| 2005–2008 | FC Wels | 51 | (17) |
| 2008–2010 | Austria Kärnten II | 4 | (0) |
| 2008–2010 | Austria Kärnten | 20 | (2) |
| 2009–2010 | → Ried (loan) | 27 | (6) |
| 2010–2013 | Rapid Wien | 59 | (13) |
| 2012–2013 | → Eskişehirspor (loan) | 28 | (2) |
| 2013–2020 | Sheffield Wednesday | 242 | (40) |
| 2020–2021 | APOEL | 23 | (0) |
| 2021–2024 | SCR Altach | 87 | (16) |
| Total | | 541 | (96) |

International career
| 2007 | Austria U19 | 1 | (3) |
| 2008 | Austria U20 | 2 | (3) |
| 2008–2010 | Austria U21 | 13 | (7) |
| 2017–2021 | Kosovo | 19 | (3) |

Managerial career
- 2021–2023: SCR Altach Youth
- 2023–2024: SCR Altach Juniors (assistant)
- 2024–: SCR Altach (assistant)
- 2025–: Kosovo (assistant)
- * Club domestic league appearances and goals

Atdhe Nuhiu (Albanian pronunciation: [ˈatðɛ nuhiˈu]; born 29 July 1989) is a Kosovan professional football coach and former player who is currently the assistant manager of Austrian Bundesliga club SCR Altach and the Kosovo national team.

Nuhiu began his youth career in Austria with SU Ried im Traunkreis and later FC Wels. He started his senior career with FC Wels, making 51 appearances and scoring 17 goals between 2005 and 2008. He subsequently played for Austria Kärnten and had a loan spell at SV Ried before transferring to Rapid Wien, where he recorded 13 goals in 59 league appearances.

Nuhiu spent the 2012–2013 season on loan at Eskişehirspor, before moving to England to play for Sheffield Wednesday, where he made 242 league appearances and scored 40 goals between 2013 and 2020. He later played for APOEL and returned to Austria to join SCR Altach, making 87 appearances and scoring 16 goals before transitioning into coaching.

At international level, Nuhiu represented Austria at youth level before switching allegiance to the Kosovo national team, earning 19 caps and scoring 3 goals between 2017 and 2021. He began his coaching career with the SCR Altach youth teams, later serving as assistant for SCR Altach's junior and senior sides. In 2025, he was appointed assistant manager of the Kosovo national team while continuing his role at SCR Altach.

== Club career ==
=== Early years ===
Atdhe Nuhiu was born on 29 July 1989 in Pristina, Kosovo to Albanian parents originally from Preševo. His father moved to Austria in the same year, and Nuhiu and his family later joined him there.

He began his career at Sportunion Ried im Traunkreis before moving to Wels in 1999. At the Regionalliga club, he played 30 matches and scored 11 goals during the 2007–08 season.

=== Austria Kärnten ===
In the summer of 2008, Nuhiu signed with Austrian Bundesliga club Austria Kärnten. He made his professional Bundesliga debut on 25 July 2008, against LASK, coming on as a substitute in the 68th minute for Manuel Weber and scoring his first Bundesliga goal 15 minutes later. The match ended in a 3–2 loss.

==== Loan to Ried ====
On 31 August 2009, on the deadline day, Nuhiu completed a transfer to SV Ried on loan for the 2009–10 season. He scored his first goal for the team on 23 September 2009 in team's 1–1 away draw at Austria Wien, just eleven days after making his debut in a losing effort against SV Mattersburg.

=== Rapid Wien ===
On 8 June 2010, Nuhiu joined fellow Austrian Bundesliga side SK Rapid Wien on a three-year contract with an option of a further one. His salary was reported to be €1.2 million per season, plus various bonuses depending on his performances. He choose squad number 15, and made his competitive debut on 22 August in the Bundesliga matchday 5 against SV Mattersburg, partnering his patriot Hamdi Salihi in an eventual 2–0 home win. Nuhiu opened his scoring account later on 13 November by scoring a last-minute equaliser against the same opponent, with the match ending 2–2.

=== Sheffield Wednesday ===
Nuhiu signed a three-year contract on a free transfer for Sheffield Wednesday on 25 July 2013. On 3 August 2013, Nuhiu scored on his debut against Queens Park Rangers. Nuhiu also scored in the comprehensive 6–0 win over Leeds United on 11 January 2014. On 1 March 2014 he scored against Middlesbrough from penalty spot in a match finished in the victory 1–0. On 12 April 2014, Nuhiu scored twice to give his team a 3–3 draw against Blackburn Rovers, where he was included in the starting line up and scored respectively the 2nd goal in the 72nd minute and the 3rd in the 5th minute of second-half stoppage time. Nuhiu scored in the next consecutive fixture on 17 April 2014 against AFC Bournemouth finished in the victory 2–4, where Nuhiu scored the opening goal of the match in the 16th minute. He continued his scoring form for another consecutive match, as he scored in the 3–2 home defeat of Sheffield Wednesday against Charlton Athletic on 21 April 2014, where Nuhiu scored a quick goal in the 3rd minute and also gave the assist for the second goal scored by Chris Maguire in the 8th minute.

On 23 August 2014, Nuhiu scored twice in the 2–3 victory against Middlesbrough, helping the team to extended their unbeaten Championship start to four matches. On the last day of the season, Nuhiu scored an important stoppage-time equalizer which meant opponents Watford came second and Bournemouth won the league. During this season, Nuhiu was Sheffield Wednesday's top scorer with 11 goals in all competitions.

On the final day of the 2017–18 season, Sheffield Wednesday defeated Norwich 5–1 for the second successive year in a row and in that game Wednesday won a penalty in the remaining minutes of the game and Nuhiu scored and completed the hat-trick and got his first hat-trick in his professional footballing career. That goal made Nuhiu Wednesday's top scorer at the end of the season. In May 2018, he signed a two-year contract extension running through May 2020; Nuhiu left Wednesday after the end of the 2019–20 season.

=== APOEL ===
On 11 September 2020, it was announced that he had signed for Cypriot club APOEL. After one season his contracted was terminated on 18 June 2021.

=== SCR Altach ===
On 30 June 2021, Nuhiu signed a two-year contract with SCR Altach, marking his return to the Austrian Bundesliga. He made his competitive debut on 17 July, in the first round of the 2021–22 edition of the Austrian Cup, also scoring his first goal in a surprising 2–1 loss to third-tier Regionalliga side SC Kalsdorf. He made his league debut in a 1–0 defeat to LASK at home a week later on 24 July, where he played 63 minutes before being replaced by Noah Bischof. His first goal came against his former club Rapid Wien on 15 August, a converted penalty-kick in injury time to secure a 2–1 win. He announced his retirement as a player on 13 October 2024.

== International career ==
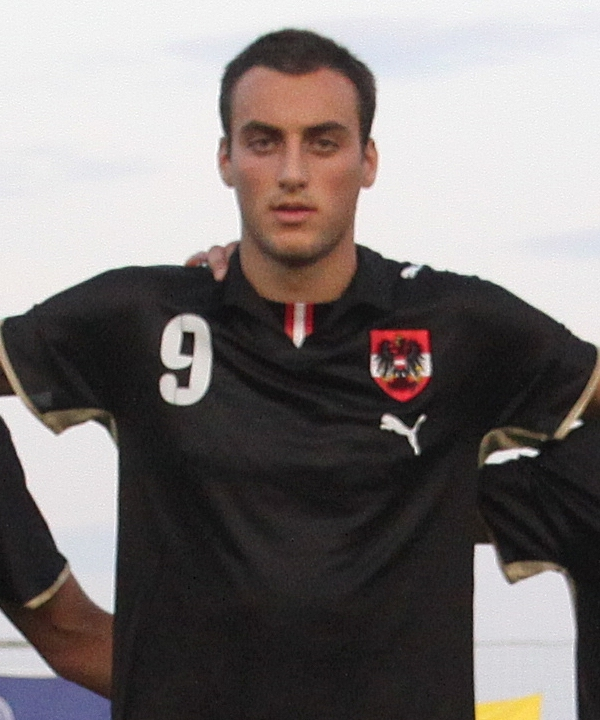
Nuhiu with Austria U21 in September 2009.

Nuhiu has played for the Austria U21 side, however on 10 September 2009 he made declarations to the media that he would not play for Austria, but rather for Albania as it is his dream to play for his own nation. In addition, when he scored two goals against the Albanian U21s in a qualifier match, he refused to celebrate. On that occasion he was wearing red-and-black boots to honor Albania. In an interview in April 2014, Nuhiu declared that it is his only intention to play for Austria, although he admitted that he had been in talks with other associations previously. On 7 November 2014, Nuhiu reiterated his desire to play for Austria, should a call-up arise.

On 18 November 2010, Nuhiu stated in an interview to the media that the problem with playing for Albania was citizenship, as he had Austrian citizenship and to receive Albanian citizenship he needed to give it up, as Austria did not permit dual citizenship. Media reported that he was called by the coach of Albania, Gianni de Biasi, for the friendly match against Armenia, on 14 August, but De Biasi did not include him in the final call up. However, on 20 August 2013 media reported that Nuhiu had started the procedures to get an Albanian passport in order to be able to represent the senior Albania national team in the future.

=== Kosovo ===
On 19 September 2014, Nuhiu returned declaring that he would play for Kosovo, when it was fully recognised by UEFA and FIFA. On 20 September 2016, Muharrem Sahiti, the assistant manager of Kosovo, said that Nuhiu was in Kosovo to complete the procedures of the Kosovo passport. On 4 January 2017, Nuhiu announced that he had received Kosovo citizenship and is ready for the next challenge. On 20 March 2017, he received a call-up from Kosovo for a 2018 FIFA World Cup qualifying match against Iceland, made his début after being named in the starting line-up and scored his side's only goal during a 2–1 defeat.

On 16 May 2021, Nuhiu through an Instagram post announced his international retirement. He collected 19 caps between 2017 and 2020 for Kosovo and scored three goals.

== Coaching career ==
On 13 October 2024, Nuhiu's retirement was announced, and he joined new head coach Fabio Ingolitsch's coaching staff at SCR Altach.

== Career statistics ==
=== Club ===
Appearances and goals by club, season and competition
| Club | Season | League | | | National cup (Note: Includes Austrian Cup, Turkish Cup, FA Cup) | | League cup (Note: Includes EFL Cup) | | Europe | | Other | | Total | |
| Club | Season | Division | Apps | Goals | Apps | Goals | Apps | Goals | Apps | Goals | Apps | Goals | Apps | Goals |
|---|---|---|---|---|---|---|---|---|---|---|---|---|---|---|
| Wels | 2006–07 | Regionalliga | 21 | 6 | 0 | 0 | — | | — | | — | | 21 | 6 |
| Wels | 2007–08 | Regionalliga | 30 | 11 | 0 | 0 | — | | — | | — | | 30 | 11 |
| Wels | Total | | 51 | 17 | 0 | 0 | — | | — | | — | | 51 | 17 |
| Austria Kärnten | 2008–09 | Austrian Bundesliga | 17 | 2 | 2 | 2 | — | | — | | — | | 19 | 4 |
| Austria Kärnten | 2009–10 | Austrian Bundesliga | 3 | 0 | 1 | 1 | — | | — | | — | | 4 | 1 |
| Austria Kärnten | Total | | 20 | 2 | 3 | 3 | — | | — | | — | | 23 | 5 |
| Austria Kärnten II | 2008–09 | Kärntner Liga | 3 | 0 | — | | — | | — | | — | | 3 | 0 |
| Austria Kärnten II | 2009–10 | Kärntner Liga | 1 | 0 | — | | — | | — | | — | | 1 | 0 |
| Austria Kärnten II | Total | | 4 | 0 | — | | — | | — | | — | | 4 | 0 |
| Ried (loan) | 2009–10 | Austrian Bundesliga | 27 | 6 | 2 | 0 | — | | — | | — | | 29 | 6 |
| Rapid Wien | 2010–11 | Austrian Bundesliga | 28 | 5 | 2 | 1 | — | | 8 (Note: Appearances in UEFA Europa League) | 2 | — | | 38 | 8 |
| Rapid Wien | 2011–12 | Austrian Bundesliga | 31 | 8 | 2 | 1 | — | | — | | — | | 33 | 9 |
| Rapid Wien | Total | | 59 | 13 | 4 | 2 | — | | 8 | 2 | — | | 71 | 17 |
| Eskişehirspor (loan) | 2012–13 | Süper Lig | 28 | 2 | 8 | 0 | — | | 4 | 1 | — | | 40 | 3 |
| Sheffield Wednesday | 2013–14 | Championship | 38 | 8 | 4 | 0 | 1 | 0 | — | | — | | 43 | 8 |
| Sheffield Wednesday | 2014–15 | Championship | 43 | 8 | 1 | 1 | 3 | 2 | — | | — | | 47 | 11 |
| Sheffield Wednesday | 2015–16 | Championship | 41 | 3 | 2 | 1 | 4 | 1 | — | | 3 (Note: Appearance(s) in Championship play-offs) | 0 | 50 | 5 |
| Sheffield Wednesday | 2016–17 | Championship | 20 | 0 | 1 | 0 | 1 | 0 | — | | 1 | 0 | 23 | 0 |
| Sheffield Wednesday | 2017–18 | Championship | 28 | 11 | 5 | 3 | 2 | 0 | — | | — | | 35 | 14 |
| Sheffield Wednesday | 2018–19 | Championship | 34 | 4 | 3 | 1 | 1 | 0 | — | | — | | 38 | 5 |
| Sheffield Wednesday | 2019–20 | Championship | 38 | 6 | 1 | 0 | 2 | 1 | — | | — | | 41 | 7 |
| Sheffield Wednesday | Total | | 242 | 40 | 17 | 6 | 14 | 4 | — | | 4 | 0 | 277 | 50 |
| APOEL | 2020–21 | First Division | 23 | 0 | 0 | 0 | — | | 3 | 1 | — | | 26 | 1 |
| SCR Altach | 2021–22 | Austrian Bundesliga | 30 | 5 | 1 | 1 | — | | — | | — | | 31 | 6 |
| SCR Altach | 2022–23 | Austrian Bundesliga | 30 | 10 | 2 | 2 | — | | — | | — | | 32 | 12 |
| SCR Altach | 2023–24 | Austrian Bundesliga | 27 | 1 | 4 | 1 | — | | — | | — | | 31 | 2 |
| SCR Altach | 2024–25 | Austrian Bundesliga | 0 | 0 | 1 | 0 | — | | — | | — | | 1 | 0 |
| SCR Altach | Total | | 87 | 16 | 8 | 4 | — | | — | | — | | 95 | 20 |
| Career total | | | 541 | 96 | 42 | 15 | 14 | 4 | 15 | 4 | 4 | 0 | 616 | 119 |

=== International ===
Appearances and goals by national team and year
| National team | Year | Apps | Goals |
|---|---|---|---|
| Kosovo | 2017 | 7 | 1 |
| Kosovo | 2018 | 6 | 1 |
| Kosovo | 2019 | 4 | 1 |
| Kosovo | 2020 | 2 | 0 |
| Total | | 19 | 3 |

Kosovo score listed first, score column indicates score after each Nuhiu goal

List of international goals scored by Atdhe Nuhiu
| No. | Date | Venue | Opponent | Score | Result | Competition | Ref. |
|---|---|---|---|---|---|---|---|
| 1 | 24 March 2017 | Loro Boriçi Stadium, Shkodër, Albania | Iceland | 1–2 | 1–2 | 2018 FIFA World Cup qualification | |
| 2 | 10 September 2018 | Fadil Vokrri Stadium, Pristina, Kosovo | Faroe Islands | 2–0 | 2–0 | 2018–19 UEFA Nations League D3 | |
| 3 | 14 November 2019 | Doosan Arena, Plzeň, Czech Republic | Czech Republic | 1–0 | 1–2 | UEFA Euro 2020 qualifying | |
