= Joost van Aken =

Dutch footballer (born 1994)

Personal information
- Full name: Joost Maurits van Aken
- Date of birth: 13 May 1994 (age 32)
- Place of birth: Haarlem, Netherlands
- Height: 1.93 m (6 ft 4 in)
- Position: Centre-back

Youth career
- 1999–2002: SV Vogelenzang
- 2002–2005: SV Hoofddorp
- 2005–2006: HFC Haarlem
- 2006–2009: Ajax
- 2009–2010: HFC Haarlem
- 2010–2014: SC Heerenveen

Senior career*
Years	Team	Apps	(Gls)
2013–2017	SC Heerenveen	84	(3)
2017–2021	Sheffield Wednesday	32	(0)
2019–2020	→ VfL Osnabrück (loan)	22	(1)
2021–2022	Zulte Waregem	1	(0)
2022–2023	SC Heerenveen	18	(1)

International career
2014	Netherlands U21	2	(0)
- * Club domestic league appearances and goals as of 28 May 2023

Joost Maurits van Aken (born 13 May 1994) is a Dutch former professional footballer who played as a centre-back. He started his senior career at SC Heerenveen, and has also played for Sheffield Wednesday, VfL Osnabrück and Zulte Waregem. Internationally, he has played for the Netherlands under-21s.

== Career ==
=== SC Heerenveen ===
Van Aken made his first appearance for SC Heerenveen on 16 February 2014 against the then champions AFC Ajax. Around two months later, van Aken scored his first goal for the club against Go Ahead Eagles.

In June 2015, van Aken signed a new three-year contract running until 2018. He went on to make 92 appearances for the club in all competitions, scoring three goals.

=== Sheffield Wednesday ===
On 30 August 2017, Sheffield Wednesday announced that they had signed van Aken from Eredevisie side SC Heerenveen for an undisclosed fee on a four-year contract. He was assigned the number 4 shirt. van Aken made his Football League debut on 9 September, playing the entire ninety minutes in a 3–1 victory over Nottingham Forest.

On 14 August 2019, van Aken joined VfL Osnabrück on a loan deal until the end of 2019–20 season.

On 12th September 2020 Van Aken returned to the Sheffield Wednesday starting line up and had a very impressive game against Cardiff City FC. He was sent off at home to Luton Town resulting in defeat on 24 October 2020, ending a run of games since his return to the club. On 20 May 2021 it was announced that he would leave Sheffield Wednesday at the end of the season, following the expiry of his contract.

=== Zulte Waregem ===
On 15 May 2021, Zulte Waregem announced that van Aken had signed a two-year deal with the Belgian club. He made his competitive debut on 24 July in the Jupiler Pro League against OH Leuven, getting sent off in a 1–1 draw. On 25 January 2022, he was released from his contract.

=== Return to Heerenveen ===
On 7 February 2022, van Aken returned to SC Heerenveen until the end of the 2021–22 season, signing as a free agent.

== Career statistics ==
As of match played 1 May 2022

Appearances and goals by club, season and competition
Club	Season	League			National Cup		League Cup		Other		Total	
Club	Season	League	Apps	Goals	Apps	Goals	Apps	Goals	Apps	Goals	Apps	Goals
SC Heerenveen	2013–14	Eredivisie	6	2	0	0	—		2	0	8	2
SC Heerenveen	2014–15	Eredivisie	30	0	0	0	—		3	0	33	0
SC Heerenveen	2015–16	Eredivisie	20	0	1	0	—		—		21	0
SC Heerenveen	2016–17	Eredivisie	26	1	2	0	—		0	0	28	1
SC Heerenveen	2017–18	Eredivisie	2	0	—		—		—		2	0
SC Heerenveen	Total		84	3	3	0	—		5	0	92	3
Sheffield Wednesday	2017–18	Championship	14	0	0	0	—		—		14	0
Sheffield Wednesday	2018–19	Championship	1	0	0	0	1	0	—		2	0
Sheffield Wednesday	2019–20	Championship	0	0	—		—		—		0	0
Sheffield Wednesday	2020–21	Championship	17	0	0	0	0	0	—		17	0
Sheffield Wednesday	Total		32	0	0	0	1	0	0	0	33	0
VfL Osnabrück (loan)	2019–20	2. Bundesliga	22	1	0	0	—		—		22	1
Zulte Waregem	2021–22	Belgian First Division A	1	0	0	0	—		—		1	0
SC Heerenveen	2021–22	Eredivisie	3	1	0	0	—		0	0	3	1
Career total			142	5	3	0	1	0	5	0	151	5
