= Adam Reach =

English footballer

Personal information
- Full name: Adam Michael Reach
- Date of birth: 3 February 1993 (age 33)
- Place of birth: Chester-le-Street, England
- Height: 1.85 m (6 ft 1 in)
- Positions: Left-back; left winger

Team information
- Current team: Lincoln City
- Number: 3

Youth career
- 2009–2011: Middlesbrough

Senior career*
Years	Team	Apps	(Gls)
2011–2016	Middlesbrough	63	(6)
2011	→ Darlington (loan)	5	(1)
2013–2014	→ Shrewsbury Town (loan)	22	(3)
2014	→ Bradford City (loan)	18	(3)
2015–2016	→ Preston North End (loan)	35	(4)
2016–2021	Sheffield Wednesday	209	(21)
2021–2024	West Bromwich Albion	71	(2)
2025	Wycombe Wanderers	12	(0)
2025–	Lincoln City	46	(5)

International career
2011	England U19	4	(0)
2013	England U20	3	(0)
- * Club domestic league appearances and goals as of 16:58, 21 November 2026 (UTC)

Adam Michael Reach (born 3 February 1993) is an English professional footballer who plays as a left-back or left winger for EFL Championship club Lincoln City.

== Club career ==
=== Middlesbrough ===
Born in Chester-le-Street, England, Reach began his football career at Middlesbrough after being scouted by Martin Carter for the club while attending Gateshead College. He progressed through the academy while studying towards a BTEC national diploma in Performance and Excellence and then through reserve team.

Reach was called up to the first team for the first time in his career, appearing as an unused substitute, in a 2–1 win against Coventry City on 25 April 2011. In a follow–up match on 7 May 2011, he scored his first goal for Middlesbrough on his debut, coming on as a substitute in the 53rd minute and scoring Middlesbrough's third goal in injury-time in a 3–0 win over Doncaster Rovers. On 17 May 2011, Reach and six other youngsters signed their first professional contracts with Middlesbrough, keeping him until the summer of 2014. After his loan spell at Darlington ended, Reach made his first appearance of the 2011–12 season, coming on as a 68th-minute substitute, in a 3–0 loss against Blackpool on 2 January 2012. A month later on 8 February 2012, he made another appearance for the side, coming on as a 78th-minute substitute, in a 2–1 loss against Sunderland in the fourth round of the FA Cup.

At the start of the 2012–13 season, Reach continued to appear as a substitute in the first two matches of the season before scoring a stunning 25 yard screamer against Burnley on 21 August 2012 on his full Middlesbrough home debut, with as the club went on to win the game 3–2. A month later on 25 September 2012, he signed a contract extension with Middlesbrough, keeping him until 2016. Reach continued to appear in the first team in the first two months of the 2012–13 season until he was dropped from the first team, due to competitions and his own injury concern. However, he found himself out of the starting line–up for a month, due to competitions and his own injury concern. Reach didn't return to the first team until on 21 October 2012 when he came on as a late substitute, in a 1–0 win against Brighton & Hove Albion. Reach then appeared in the next three matches before losing his first team place, due to competitions and was playing in the reserve team for the next two months. On 29 December 2012, he returned to the first team against Blackpool, coming on as a 65th minute and scored his second goal of the season, in a 4–2 win. Two weeks later on 12 January 2013, Reach set up the club's first goal of the game, in a 2–1 loss against Watford. However, his run of first team football was short–lived and was out of the starting line–up as the 2012–13 season progressed, resulting in him placed in playing for the reserve team once again. Despite dropped from the first team once again, he started three out of the five matches for the side. At the end of the 2012–13 season, Reach made twenty appearances and scoring two times in all competitions. After the spending most of the 2013–14 season out on loan, he appeared two times in the last two remaining matches of the season.

At the start of the 2014–15 season, Reach became a first team regular for Middlesbrough under the management of Karanka, playing in the left–midfield position. He then contributed three assists for the side, all of them were wins, coming against Oldham Athletic on 12 August 2014, Bolton Wanderers on 18 August 2014 and Huddersfield Town on 13 September 2014. His performance, at one point, attracted attention from Premier League clubs, but no offers has been made. On 23 September 2014 against Liverpool in the third round of the League Cup, Reach scored his first goal of the season to equalise and the game led to extra time (and eventually penalty shoot–out) and he then scored two in the shoot-out, as Middlesbrough lost 14–13 on penalties. A week later on 4 October 2014, he scored his second goal of the season, in a 2–0 win against Fulham. A month later on 3 November 2014, Reach signed a four–year contract with the club, keeping him until 2019. Since the start of the 2014–15 season, Reach appeared in every match until on 29 November 2014, he was dropped to the substitute bench for a match against Blackburn Rovers. But Reach returned to the starting line–up in a follow–up match against Millwall on 6 December 2014, setting up two goals, in a 5–1 win, and then assisted another goal, in a 2–0 win against Derby County on 13 December 2014. Since returning to the starting line–up, he remained in the first team for the next two months. This lasted until Reach was dropped out for the starting line–up for the next three matches. On 14 March 2015, Reach returned to the starting line–up, in a 4–1 win against Ipswich Town. He then appeared in the next four matches but his performance in a 2–0 loss against Watford on 6 April 2015 received criticism from fans and was dropped from the squad as a result. On 25 April 2015, Reach returned to the starting line–up against Fulham and scored in a 4–3 loss. He then played once in the Championship play-offs, as Middlesbrough lost 2–0 to Norwich City in the Championship play-off final at Wembley Stadium. At the end of the 2014–15 season, Reach made forty–six appearances and scoring three times in all competitions.

At the start of the 2015–16 season, Reach scored his first goal of the season, in a 3–1 win against Sheffield Wednesday on 29 August 2015. After the match, Manager Karanka praised his performance. However, he found his first team opportunities limited, due to competitions in the midfield positions. By the time Reach departed from Middlesbrough, he made six appearances and scored once for the side.

Ahead of the 2016–17 season, Reach was linked a move away from Middlesbrough, leading him to leave the club to pursuit first team football. There were suggestions from local newspaper Gazette Live that he should stay at the club as a cover in different positions in case of the club's injury crisis. By the time Reach departed from Middlesbrough, he only appeared once as an unused substitute, coming against West Bromwich Albion on 28 August 2016.

==== Loan spells ====
On 24 November 2011, Reach joined Conference club Darlington on a month's emergency loan. He made his debut for the club two days later on 26 November 2011, starting the whole game, in a 2–0 win against Tamworth. Reach then scored his first goal for Darlington, in a 2–1 win against Cambridge United on 17 December 2011. He became a first team regular for the side, making five appearances and scoring once in all competitions before returning to his parent club.

After being told by Middlesbrough that Reach would be loaned out ahead of the 2013–14 season, he joined League One side Shrewsbury Town on a one-month loan on 16 August 2013. He scored on his debut a day later, helping the club secure a 2–0 win against Swindon Town. Since making his debut for Shrewsbury Town, Reach quickly became a first team regular for the side, playing in the left–midfield position. He then scored his second goal for the club, in a 1–0 win against Notts County on 23 November 2013 and then scored his third goal for the club seven days later, in a 3–1 win against Stevenage. His loan was later extended on three occasions, all leading up to until 1 January 2014. when he returned to his parent club to be assessed by new head coach Aitor Karanka.

On 23 January 2014, Reach joined Bradford City on loan until 22 February 2014. He made his debut five days later, playing the full 90 minutes in a 0–0 draw at home to Preston North End. Since making his debut for the club, Reach quickly established himself in the starting eleven, playing in the left–midfield position. On 23 February 2014, Reach extended his loan spell at Bradford City by a further month, meaning his stay is now until 23 March 2014. On 1 March, he scored his first goal for the club in a 3–2 defeat against Stevenage. On 24 March 2014, Reach extended his loan with the Bantams for another month, meaning his stay was until 21 April 2014. He later scored two more goals for the side before returning to his parent club in late–April. By the time Reach left Bradford City, he made eighteen appearances and scoring three times in all competitions for the side.

On 26 September 2015, Reach was loaned out to newly promoted Championship side Preston North End for three months. He made his debut on the same day in a 1–1 draw at home against Wolverhampton Wanderers. Having played his first three matches for the side in the left–midfield position, Reach played in the left–back position for the next two months. He helped the club keep five out of the six consecutive clean sheets, playing in the left–back position between 20 October 2015 and 7 November 2015. On 15 December 2015, Reach scored his first goal for Preston North End, in a 1–1 draw against Birmingham City. A week on 26 December 2015, he scored his second goal for the club, in a 3–1 loss against Huddersfield Town. After impressing during his first three months, Reach's loan was extended until the end of the season on 2 January 2016. Since making his debut for Preston North End, Reach appeared in every match for the side until he missed two matches, due to injury. He scored his third goal for the club, in a 3–1 loss against Brentford on 23 January 2016. Three weeks later on 13 February 2016, Reach scored his fourth goal for Preston North End, in a 2–1 win against Wolverhampton Wanderers. Since returning to the first team, he has rotated into playing different positions, such as, left wing, left wing-back, as part of a front three and lone striker for the rest of the season. Having finished the 2015–16 season, making thirty–six appearances and scoring four times in all competitions, Reach returned to his parent club.

=== Sheffield Wednesday ===
On 31 August 2016, Reach signed a three-year contract with Championship club Sheffield Wednesday. for an undisclosed fee, reported to be around £5 million. Middlesbrough previously rejected a £2 million bid from Sheffield Wednesday for him.

Reach made his debut for the club at home on 10 September 2016 against Wigan Athletic, which ended in a 2–1 victory. Since making his debut for Sheffield Wednesday, he quickly became first team regular for the side, rotating into playing different positions, such as, left wing, left wing-back, as part of a front three and lone striker. Reach received his first yellow card on 26 November 2016 in a 2–0 away victory over Wolverhampton Wanderers. In the next two matches for the club, he provided an assist in two consecutive matches against Preston North End and Reading. Reach scored his first goal for the club in a 1–1 away draw against Preston North End on 31 December 2016. He later scored two more goals later in the 2016–17 season, coming against Birmingham City on 10 February 2017 and then against Queens Park Rangers on 17 April 2017. A successful first season led Wednesday to finish in fourth place for the 2016–17 season, qualifying for the play-offs, in an attempt to receive promotion to the 2017–18 Premier League season. After a 1–1 aggregate score, Wednesday lost 3–4 on penalties to Huddersfield Town, thus confirming their stay in the second level of English football for the 2017–18 EFL Championship season. In his first season at the club, Reach made forty–two appearances and scoring three times in all competitions.

At the start of the 2017–18 season, Reach continued to regain his first team place for Sheffield Wednesday, rotating into playing different positions by starting out in left–back and left midfield. He scored his first goal of the season on 28 October 2017, in a 1–1 draw against Barnsley, at the Hillsborough Stadium. This was followed up by scoring in the next two matches against Millwall and Aston Villa. After the match, Manager Carlos Carvalhal praised his performance, while Reach, himself, stated that the match was his best form of his career. His goal against Aston Villa later earned Sky Bet Championship Goal of the Month winner for November. He was also awarded the club's October Player of the Month. Reach then played an important role against Nottingham Forest on 26 December 2017, scoring and setting up the club's fourth goal of the game, in a 4–0 win. After the match, his performance was praised by the local newspaper, The Star, calling his performance "one of his best performances in a Wednesday shirt." By the second half or the season, he, once again, rotated in different positions, playing in the right–back, centre–midfield, attacking midfield and centre forward. Reach then captained his first match, starting the whole game, in a 0–0 draw against Middlesbrough on 30 January 2018. He went on to captain four more times for Sheffield Wednesday. Throughout the 2017–18 season, Reach contributed to assisting goals, totalling up to twelve. At the end of the season, he made fifty–three appearances (playing all forty–six league matches) and scoring four times in all competitions. For his performance, Reach was awarded the club's Player of the Year award, as well as, the Wise Old Owls Award.

At the start of the 2018–19 season, Reach started in the first three matches of the season, including scoring his first goal of the season, in a 2–0 win against Sunderland in the first round of the League Cup, before being sidelined with a knock that saw him miss one match. He made his return to the starting line–up in the attacking midfield position and helped the side win 2–1 win against Millwall on 22 August 2018. A week later on 1 September 2018, Reach scored his first goal of the season, as well as, setting up the club's second goal of the game, in a 2–1 win against Reading. Since returning to the first team from injury, he quickly regained his first team place for the side, playing in different various midfield positions. However, his performance has been mixed, with The Star said: "Reach seems to struggle with the basics like keeping possession and anticipating passes. He looks like an exhausted man. His delivery and final ball in the free role kept on letting him down." Manager Jos Luhukay said his performance, saying: " 'He must make the difference for us with assists and goals. He must work on that.' Accepts the player hasn't produced his best form since the international break." Despite this, Reach then scored two goals in two matches between 28 September 2018 and 3 October 2018 against Leeds United and West Bromwich Albion. His performance earned him a nomination for September's Championship goal of the month, which he won, and PFA Fans' Championship Player of the Month, which he lost out to Dwight Gayle. Reach then added three more goals by the end of the year (including one where he was once again nominated and won for November's Championship goal of the month). He also was linked away from the club in the January transfer window but ended up staying after no move was materialised. Having not scored for two months, On 23 February 2019, Reach scored twice for the club, in a 3–1 win against Swansea City. Despite suffering from injuries on two occasions later in the 2018–19 season, he went on to make forty–six appearances and scoring nine times in all competitions.

At the start of the 2019–20 season, Reach continued to regain his first team place for the side, playing in different various midfield positions. On 28 September 2019, he scored his first goal of the season, as well as, setting up the club's fourth goal of the game, in a 4–1 win against Middlesbrough. His second goal of the season then came on 4 January 2020, in a 1–0 win against Brighton & Hove Albion. However, Reach suffered a toe injury that kept him out for a month. Despite being in the first team regular, Reach's performance has received criticism, with Yorkshire Live said: "True, injuries have hampered the winger. His form has fluctuated, resulting in him only finding the back of the net once in 24 starts and six substitute appearances in the league." He agreed with the criticism, saying: "My own season's been similar to the team's, a little bit topsy-turvy. I've had some good moments and some not-so-good moments. Consistency has been a positive of my time at this club but this season let it down a bit. I think I've improved in areas and, if I can start each season a slightly better player or person, that's good." Once the season resumed behind closed doors because of the COVID-19 pandemic, Reach returned to the first team on 20 June 2020 against Nottingham Forest, coming on as a 74th-minute substitute, in a 1–1 draw. He went on to make two starts out of the nine remaining matches of the season, and finished the season, making forty appearances and scoring two times in all competitions.

On 20 May 2021 it was announced that he would leave Sheffield Wednesday at the end of the season, following the expiry of his contract.

=== West Bromwich Albion ===
On 2 August 2021, Reach joined Championship side West Bromwich Albion on a three-year deal. On 19 March 2022, he scored his first goal for the club in a 2–2 away draw at Bristol City, tapping in a 93-minute equaliser, after a flowing passage of play.

He departed the club upon the expiration of his contract at the end of the 2023–24 season.

=== Wycombe Wanderers ===
On 3 February 2025, Reach joined League One side Wycombe Wanderers.

On 20 May 2025, the club announced he would be leaving in June when his contract expired.

=== Lincoln city ===
On 1 September 2025, Reach signed for League One side Lincoln City, signing a one-year contract. He made his debut the following day, starting the match against Notts County in the EFL Trophy and getting the assist for Sonny Bradley's opener. His first goal came away to Peterborough United, a direct free-kick in an eventual 3–0 win. His goal against Barnsley on 29 December 2026, won for the EFL Goal of the Month for December with a right-foot volley. On 26 January 2026, Lincoln City triggered their option early, keeping Reach at Lincoln until the end of the 2026–27 season, which included an additional further appearance-linked option for another 12 months.

Reach scored Lincoln's first second tier goal in 65 years on Lincoln's return to the Championship on the opening day of the 2026–27 season, with a well placed side-footed finish against his former club Middlesbrough. On 22 October 2026, the club triggered a one-year contract extenstion extending his contract at Lincoln until the summer of 2028.

== International career ==
In August 2011, Reach was called up to the England U19 for the first time in his career. He made his England U19 debut, coming on as a 65th-minute substitute, in a 0–0 draw against Netherlands U19 on 1 September 2011. Reach went on to make four appearances for the U19 side.

On 28 May 2013, he was named in manager Peter Taylor's 21-man squad for the 2013 FIFA U-20 World Cup. He scored on his debut on 16 June, in a 3–0 win in a warm-up game against Uruguay U20. Reach played all the three matches, as England U20 were eliminated from the tournament. At one point, he was considered to be called up by England U21 but failed to make the cut.

== Career statistics ==
As of 21 November 2026

Appearances and goals by club, season and competition
Club	Season	League			FA Cup		League Cup		Other		Total	
Club	Season	Division	Apps	Goals	Apps	Goals	Apps	Goals	Apps	Goals	Apps	Goals
Middlesbrough	2010–11	Championship	1	1	0	0	0	0	—		1	1
Middlesbrough	2011–12	Championship	1	0	1	0	0	0	—		2	0
Middlesbrough	2012–13	Championship	16	2	2	0	2	0	—		20	2
Middlesbrough	2013–14	Championship	2	0	—		1	0	—		3	0
Middlesbrough	2014–15	Championship	39	2	3	0	3	1	1 (Note: Appearance in Championship play-offs)	0	46	3
Middlesbrough	2015–16	Championship	4	1	—		2	0	—		6	1
Middlesbrough	Total		63	6	6	0	8	1	1	0	78	7
Darlington (loan)	2011–12	Conference Premier	5	1	—		—		1 (Note: Appearance in FA Trophy)	0	6	1
Shrewsbury Town (loan)	2013–14	League One	22	3	1	0	—		1 (Note: Appearances in Football League Trophy)	0	24	3
Bradford City (loan)	2013–14	League One	18	3	—		—		—		18	3
Preston North End (loan)	2015–16	Championship	35	4	1	0	—		—		36	4
Sheffield Wednesday	2016–17	Championship	39	3	1	0	0	0	2	0	42	3
Sheffield Wednesday	2017–18	Championship	46	4	5	0	2	0	—		53	4
Sheffield Wednesday	2018–19	Championship	43	8	3	0	1	1	—		47	9
Sheffield Wednesday	2019–20	Championship	37	1	2	1	1	0	—		40	2
Sheffield Wednesday	2020–21	Championship	44	5	2	1	3	0	—		49	6
Sheffield Wednesday	Total		209	21	13	2	7	1	2	0	231	24
West Bromwich Albion	2021–22	Championship	34	2	1	0	1	0	—		36	2
West Bromwich Albion	2022–23	Championship	18	0	3	0	2	0	—		23	0
West Bromwich Albion	2023–24	Championship	19	0	0	0	0	0	—		19	0
West Bromwich Albion	Total		71	2	4	0	3	0	0	0	78	2
Wycombe Wanderers	2024–25	League One	12	0	1	0	0	0	2 (Note: Appearance in League One play-offs)	0	15	0
Lincoln City	2025–26	League One	31	4	1	0	0	0	2	0	34	4
Lincoln City	2026–27	Championship	15	1	0	0	1	0	—		16	1
Lincoln City	Total		46	5	1	0	1	0	2	0	50	5
Career total			480	45	27	2	19	2	9	0	535	49

== Personal life ==
Growing up, Reach supported Newcastle United and even wanted to play for the club but was rejected twice, leading him to move on somewhere else.

== Honours ==
Lincoln City

- EFL League One: 2025–26

Individual

- Sheffield Wednesday Player of the Season: 2017–18
- EFL League One Goal of the Month: December 2025
