= Pontefract Collieries F.C. =

Association football club in England

Coordinates: 53°41′47.37″N 1°18′50.57″W

Pontefract Collieries
- Full name: Pontefract Collieries Football Club
- Nickname: The Colls
- Founded: 1958
- Ground: The Hunters Stadium Also known as Beechnut Lane, Pontefract
- Capacity: 1,400 (250 seats)
- Manager: Jimmy Williams
- League: Northern Premier League Division One East
- 2025–26: Northern Premier League Division One East, 6th of 22
Home colours	Away colours

Pontefract Collieries Football Club is a semi-professional football club based in Pontefract, West Yorkshire, England. The team currently plays in the Northern Premier League Division One East. The club is affiliated to the West Riding County Football Association and Castleford & District Football Association. Founded in 1958 and nicknamed 'The Colls', they have traditional local rivalries with neighbours Glasshoughton Welfare, Hemsworth Miners Welfare and Selby Town. More recently, a rivalry has developed with Ossett United, including a promotion play-off at the end of the 2018–19 season, however recent stadium upgrades resulted in the two sharing stadiums between September and November 2025.

== Formation ==
The club was founded in 1958 by workers from the nearby Prince of Wales Colliery and other collieries in the local area.

== Ground ==
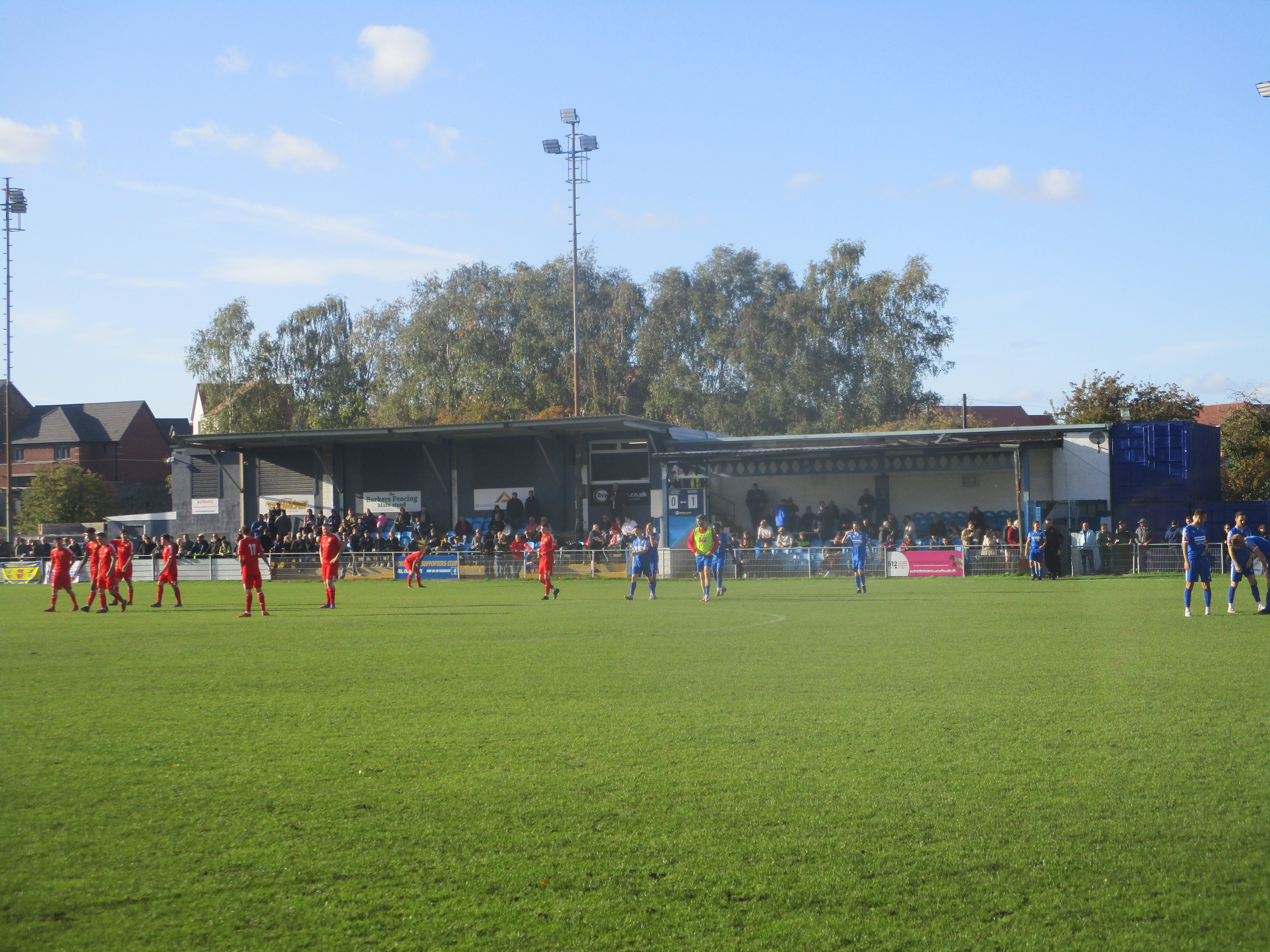
The Norman Manley Memorial Stand in 2022.

The Norman Manley Memorial Stand in 2026

Pontefract Collieries play their home games Beechnut Lane, situated near to the site of the former Prince of Wales Colliery. The ground is served by Pontefract Tanshelf railway station which is situated by the road entrance to the ground.

The ground is fully floodlit with a capacity of approximately 1,200 spectators and comprises hard standing area around the perimeter of the pitch. One stand behind the goals has a terrace with cover. The main stand holds the seating provision, with the seats obtained from Manchester City's old Maine Road ground when it was demolished. There is also hospitality provision in the main stand in the Carlsberg Lounge. Access to all stands is through one of two turnstiles in the main stand. The main stand also houses a club shop.

In 2025, the grass pitch was replaced with a FIFA Pro standard artificial 3G playing surface, with works taking place alongside other general ground improvements and the creation of additional food and beverage provision.

With the Ground works now completed the stadium has improved facilities, easier access for all users around the entirety of the ground and a Stadium being used by individuals across the local district.

The early stages of the redevelopment also saw the construction of the 1958 bar in the north west corner of the ground.

Wakefield A.F.C. have played at the ground as tenants since 2025.

== Recent history ==
=== 2012–13 ===
The season ended with only one defeat in the last ten games including victories over Askern Villa of 9–0 and 10–2. The club finished 5th for the third season in a row.

=== 2013–14 ===
This was a season of consolidation which ended in a disappointing 9th place but with a clear plan in place for the 2014–15 season.

=== 2014–15 ===
The plan was delivered as The Colls finished as runners-up in North Counties East League Division One and were promoted back to the NCEL Premier Division after a 15-year absence.

=== 2015–16 ===
The latter part of the season saw the Colls with a new management team of Craig Parry, Manager and former Colls Keeper, assisted by Craig Rouse and Nigel Danby. The Colls fought to the bitter end but ended up third from bottom and back in Division One.

=== 2016–17 ===
A great start to the season led by Manager Craig Parry, Assistant Manager Craig Rouse and Head Player/Coach Luke Jeffs saw the Colls win 9 from 9 (including pre-season friendlies) and later a run of 21 games with only one defeat. With the Colls fate in their own hands they only needed to win away at Worsborough Bridge in the final game. This they duly did and returned to the NCEL Premier Division.

=== 2018–19 ===
In the NPL Division One East they finished as runners-up to Morpeth Town. A good pre-season saw the Colls gain 2 pieces of silverware – The Bill Cook Memorial Trophy against Glasshoughton Welfare and the Inaugural Colliery Cup from a keenly contested game against NPL Division One West side Atherton Collieries.

=== 2019-20 and 2020-21 ===
The 19-20 season saw Pontefract in fourth place at the time of the campaign ending, before manager's Craig Parry and Craig Rouse departed to join Worksop Town.

The 20-21 season saw Andy Monkhouse take the reins, but ultimately struggled with a brand new squad - before the season once again came to a close (in October 2020).

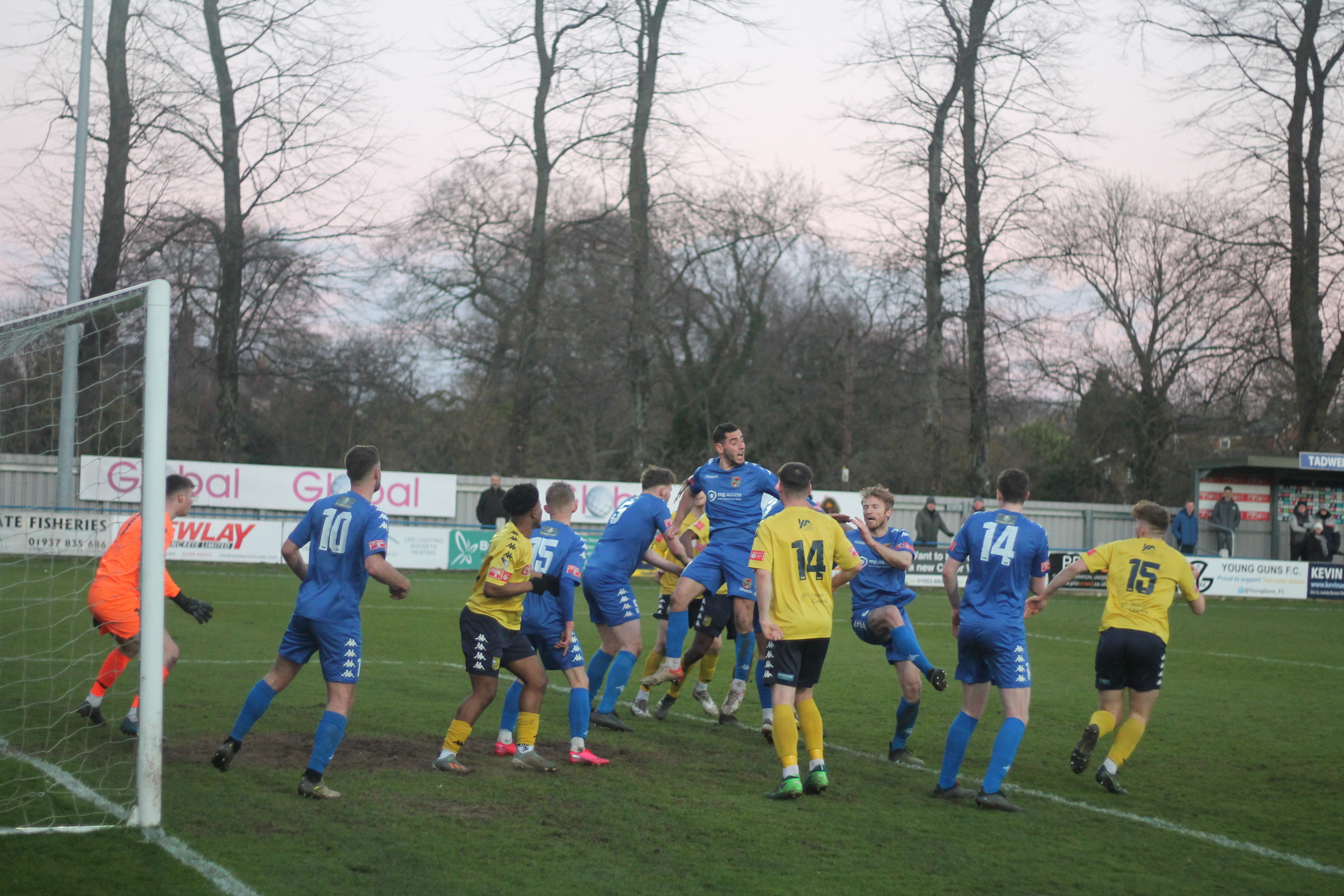
Pontefract Collieries playing at Tadcaster Albion in January 2022.

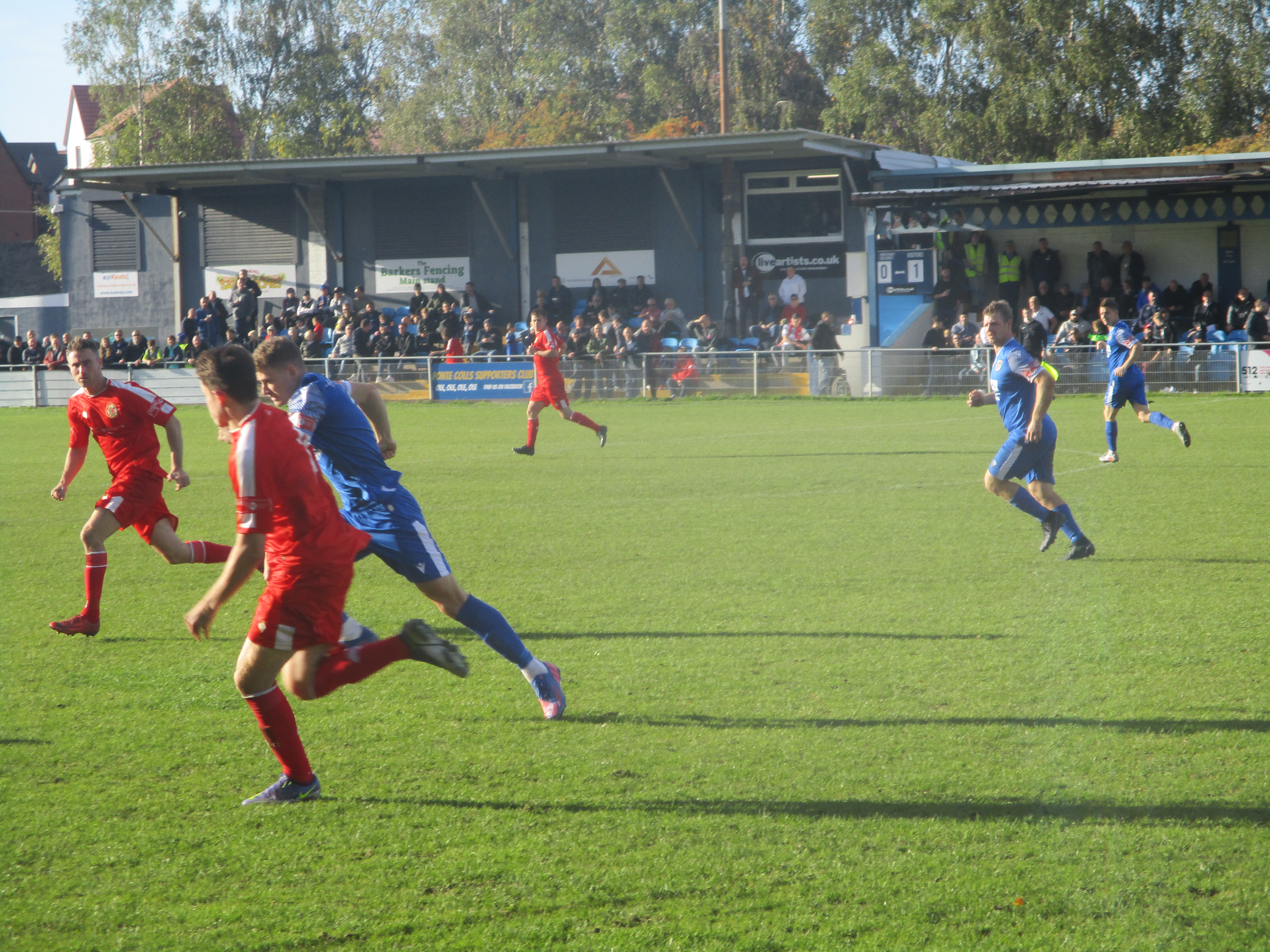
Pontefract Collieries playing North Shields FC in October 2022.

== Current squad ==
As of 21 August 2026

Note: Flags indicate national team as defined under FIFA eligibility rules; some limited exceptions apply. Players may hold more than one non-FIFA nationality.

No.	Pos.	Nation	Player
—	GK	ENG	Harry Christy
—	DF	ENG	Jack Greenhough
—	DF	ENG	Ben Middleton
—	DF	ENG	Connor O'Grady
—	DF	ENG	Alfie Perry
—	DF	ENG	Gavin Rothery
—	DF	ENG	Harry Spratt
—	DF	ENG	Jack Steers
—	MF	ENG	Kiyani Clayton
—	MF	ENG	Joe Kenny

No.	Pos.	Nation	Player
—	MF	ENG	Alex Metcalfe
—	MF	ENG	Alex Pavan
—	MF	ENG	Niah Payne
—	MF	ENG	Jack Vann
—	MF	ENG	Elliott Walker
—	FW	ENG	Joe Lumsden
—	FW	ENG	Jayden Major
—	FW	ENG	Nathan Modest
—	FW	ENG	James Morris
—	FW	ENG	Jack Wilson

== Records ==
- Best FA Cup performance: Fourth qualifying round, 2021–22 (replay)
- Best FA Trophy performance: Second qualifying round, 2021–22, 2024–25
- Best FA Vase performance: Fourth round, 2017–18

== Honours ==
- West Riding Senior County Cup
  - Winners 2023–24
- Northern Counties East League
  - Premier Division champions 2017–18
  - Division One North champions 1983–84
  - Floodlit Cup winners 1987–88, 1988–89
  - Wilkinson Sword Trophy winners 1995–96
- Yorkshire Football League
  - Division Three champions 1981–82
- Castleford & District FA Embleton Cup
  - Winners 1982–83, 1986–87, 1995–96, 1999–00, 2005–06, 2006–07, 2007–08

== Squad ==
Note: Flags indicate national team as defined under FIFA eligibility rules; some limited exceptions apply. Players may hold more than one non-FIFA nationality.

No.	Pos.	Nation	Player
1	GK	POL	Sebastian Malkowski
2	DF	ENG	Jack Greenhough
3	DF	ENG	Connor Smythe
4	DF	ENG	Jameel Ible
5	DF	ENG	Jake Picton
6	DF	ENG	Spencer Clarke
7	MF	ENG	Cody Cromack
8	MF	ENG	Jamie Williams
9	FW	ENG	Joe Lumsden
10	FW	ENG	Vaughan Redford

No.	Pos.	Nation	Player
11	MF	ENG	James Baxendale
12	DF	ENG	Fabien Bailey
13	GK	ENG	Adam Lax
14	MF	ENG	Alex Starcenko
15	MF	ENG	Gavin Rothery
16	MF	ENG	Bradley Docherty
17	MF	ENG	Michael Dunn
18	DF	ENG	John Cyrus
19	DF	ENG	Luke Jeffs
—	FW	GIB	Adam Priestley

== Club colours and kit ==
The club's traditional colours are blue and black. For the 2026–27 season, Pontefract Collieries adopted the following home kit.

Pontefract Collieries home kit for the 2026–27 season

The away kit for the 2026–27 season featured a yellow shirt with claret detailing, black shorts and yellow socks.

Pontefract Collieries away kit for the 2026–27 season
