= Connor O'Grady =

English footballer

Personal information
- Full name: Connor Joseph O'Grady
- Date of birth: 5 December 1997 (age 28)
- Place of birth: Sheffield, England
- Position: Defender

Team information
- Current team: Pontefract Collieries

Youth career
- –2016: Sheffield Wednesday

Senior career*
Years	Team	Apps	(Gls)
2016–2019	Sheffield Wednesday	2	(0)
2019–2021	Buxton	33	(3)
2021–2024	Stalybridge Celtic	70	(5)
2024–2025	Matlock Town	15	(0)
2025–	Emley	1	(1)
- * Club domestic league appearances and goals as of 20:24, 25 August 2025 (UTC)

Connor Joseph O'Grady (born 5 December 1997) is a football player plays as a defender for Pontefract Collieries. He has also played for Sheffield Wednesday.

== Club career ==
=== Sheffield Wednesday ===
O'Grady signed his first professional contract for Sheffield Wednesday in June 2016.

In August 2016 he made his first team debut for the club, playing the whole game as Wednesday lost to Cambridge United in the first round of the Football League Cup.

=== Buxton ===
He then joined Buxton.

=== Stalybridge Celtic ===
In May 2021 he joined Stalybridge Celtic.

=== Matlock Town ===
In May 2024, O'Grady joined Northern Premier League Premier Division club Matlock Town.

=== Emley ===
On 25 August 2025, O'Grady made his debut and scored his first goal for Emley in a 1–1 draw against Garforth Town.

=== Career statistics ===
As of 10 August 2016.

Club	Season	League		FA Cup		League Cup		Other		Total	
Club	Season	App	Goals	App	Goals	App	Goals	App	Goals	App	Goals
Sheffield Wednesday
Sheffield Wednesday	2016–17	0	0	0	0	1	0	0	0	1	0
Sheffield Wednesday	2017–18	0	0	1	0	0	0	0	0	1	0
Total		0	0	1	0	1	0	0	0	2	0
