= 2019–20 Sheffield Wednesday F.C. season =

English football club season

Sheffield Wednesday
2019–20 season
- Chairman: Dejphon Chansiri
- Manager: Steve Bruce (until 17 July); Garry Monk (from 6 September)
- Stadium: Hillsborough, Owlerton
- Championship: 16th
- FA Cup: Fifth Round (Eliminated by Manchester City)
- EFL Cup: Third Round (Eliminated by Everton)
- Top goalscorer: League: Steven Fletcher (13 goals); All: Steven Fletcher (13 goals)
- Highest home attendance: 28,028 (vs Barnsley; Championship)
- Lowest home attendance: 21,485 (vs Everton; EFL Cup)
- Average home league attendance: 23,773
Home colours	Away colours

The 2019–20 season was Sheffield Wednesday's eighth consecutive season in the Championship. Along with competing in the Championship, the club also participated in the FA Cup and the EFL Cup.

The season covered the period from 1 July 2019 to 22 July 2020.

== Transfers and contracts ==
=== Transfers in ===
Date	Position	Nationality	Name	From	Fee	Ref.
10 July 2019	CB	(Germany)	Julian Börner	(Germany) Arminia Bielefeld	Free transfer	
11 July 2019	RB	(England)	Moses Odubajo	(England) Brentford	Free transfer	
13 July 2019	RM	(England)	Kadeem Harris	(Wales) Cardiff City	Free transfer	
30 July 2019	RB	(England)	Osaze Urhoghide	(England) AFC Wimbledon	Free transfer	
6 August 2019	GK	(England)	Paul Jones	(England) Fleetwood Town	Free transfer	
8 August 2019	CM	(Australia)	Massimo Luongo	(England) Queens Park Rangers	Undisclosed	
15 January 2020	RW	(Argentina)	Manuel Hidalgo	(Italy) Triestina	Undisclosed	
30 January 2020	LB	(England)	Ryan Galvin	(England) Wigan Athletic	Free transfer	

=== Transfers out ===
Date	Position	Nationality	Name	To	Fee	Ref.
1 July 2019	CM	(Switzerland)	Almen Abdi	Retired		
1 July 2019	RM	(Scotland)	George Boyd	(England) Peterborough United	Released	
1 July 2019	MF	(England)	Warren Clarke	(England) Buxton	Released	
1 July 2019	CF	(England)	Gary Hooper	(New Zealand) Wellington Phoenix	Released	
1 July 2019	CM	(England)	David Jones	(England) Oldham Athletic	Released	
1 July 2019	RW	(Portugal)	Marco Matias	(Portugal) Belenenses SAD	Released	
1 July 2019	GK	(England)	Cameron McCulloch	Free agent	Released	
1 July 2019	CB	(Denmark)	Frederik Nielsen	(Denmark) Skive IK	Released	
1 July 2019	CB	(England)	Connor O'Grady	(England) Buxton	Released	
1 July 2019	LB	(Czech Republic)	Daniel Pudil	(Czech Republic) Mladá Boleslav	Released	
1 July 2019	GK	(England)	Dan Wallis	(Norway) Valdres FK	Released	
1 July 2019	DF	(England)	Liam Williams	(Wales) Airbus UK Broughton	Released	
6 August 2019	FW	(Portugal)	Lucas João	(England) Reading	Undisclosed	
1 January 2020	CB	(England)	Jordan Thorniley	(England) Blackpool	Undisclosed	
13 January 2020	RB	(Wales)	Ash Baker	(Wales) Newport County	Undisclosed	

=== Loans in ===
Date	Position	Nationality	Name	To	End date	Ref.
8 August 2019	RW	(England)	Jacob Murphy	(England) Newcastle United	22 July 2020	
8 August 2019	CB	(Scotland)	David Bates	(Germany) Hamburg	30 June 2020	
29 January 2020	LW	(Netherlands)	Alessio Da Cruz	(Italy) Parma	22 July 2020	
31 January 2020	FW	(England)	Connor Wickham	(England) Crystal Palace	22 July 2020	
31 January 2020	AM	(England)	Josh Windass	(England) Wigan Athletic	22 July 2020	

=== Loans out ===
Date	Position	Nationality	Name	To	End date	Ref.
9 August 2019	CM	(England)	Connor Kirby	(England) Macclesfield Town	30 June 2020	
14 August 2019	CB	(Netherlands)	Joost van Aken	(Germany) VfL Osnabrück	30 June 2020	
20 August 2019	RW	(England)	Jack Stobbs	(Scotland) Livingston	14 January 2020	
22 August 2019	LB	(England)	Matt Penney	(Germany) St Pauli	30 June 2020	
20 September 2019	DF	(Republic of Ireland)	Ciaran Brennan	(England) Gainsborough Trinity	29 October 2019	
21 November 2019	MF	(England)	Liam Shaw	(England) Chesterfield	21 December 2019	

=== New contracts ===
Date from	Position	Nationality	Name	Length	Expiry	Ref.
2 July 2019	DF	(Republic of Ireland)	Ciaran Brennan	—	—	
2 July 2019	MF	(England)	Ben Hughes	—	—	
2 July 2019	FW	(England)	Jordan O’Brien	—	—	
2 July 2019	FW	(Scotland)	Fraser Preston	—	—	
2 July 2019	GK	(England)	Josh Render	—	—	
2 July 2019	DF	(England)	Joe West	—	—	
9 July 2019	GK	(Republic of Ireland)	Keiren Westwood	2 years	June 2021	
12 July 2019	RB	(Scotland)	Liam Palmer	3 years	June 2022	
26 July 2019	CM	(England)	Kieran Lee	1 year	June 2020	
17 September 2019	CM	(England)	Alex Hunt	2 years	June 2021	
27 January 2020	GK	(England)	Cameron Dawson	4 1/2 years	June 2024	
28 February 2020	CM	(England)	Liam Waldock	1 1/2 years	June 2021	
4 June 2020	CM	(Netherlands)	Joey Pelupessy	1 year	June 2021	
4 June 2020	LB	(England)	Matt Penney	1 year	June 2021	
4 June 2020	RB	(England)	Osaze Urhoghide	1 year	June 2021	
23 June 2020	DF	(Republic of Ireland)	Ciaran Brennan	—	—	
23 June 2020	DF	(England)	Luke Cox	—	—	
23 June 2020	MF	(England)	Ben Hughes	1 year	June 2021	
23 June 2020	GK	(England)	Luke Jackson	—	—	
23 June 2020	MF	(England)	Lewis Farmer	—	—	
23 June 2020	FW	(England)	Charles Hagan	—	—	
23 June 2020	MF	(England)	Charlie Reaney	—	—	
23 June 2020	GK	(England)	Josh Render	1 year	June 2021	
23 June 2020	DF	(England)	Declan Thompson	—	—	
24 June 2020	MF	(England)	Kieran Lee	1 month	July 2020	
24 June 2020	FW	(Kosovo)	Atdhe Nuhiu	1 month	July 2020	
24 June 2020	GK	(England)	Paul Jones	1 month	July 2020	

== Pre-season ==
As of 10 July 2019, Sheffield Wednesday have announced seven pre-season friendlies against Northampton Town, Lincoln City, Stocksbridge Park Steels, VfB Lubeck, Holstein Kiel, Shrewsbury Town and Espanyol.

9 July 2019 Friendly	Shrewsbury Town	0–2	Sheffield Wednesday	Ferreiras, Portugal
19:00 BST		Report	Joao 38'; Winnall 66'	Stadium: Estadio da Nora

13 July 2019 Friendly	Lincoln City	1–3	Sheffield Wednesday	Lincoln
13:00 BST	Adebayo-Smith 75'	Report	Rhodes 1'; Reach 24'; Eardley 60' (o.g.)	Stadium: Sincil Bank

13 July 2019 Friendly	Stocksbridge Park Steels	0–5	Sheffield Wednesday	Stocksbridge
15:00 BST		Report	Winnall 29'; Harris 60'; Nuhiu 64'; Forestieri 67' van Aken 90+1'	Stadium: Look Local Stadium

16 July 2019 Friendly	Northampton Town	0–4	Sheffield Wednesday	Northampton
19:30 BST		Report	Forestieri 17'; Fletcher 44'; Nuhiu 59'; Rhodes 82'	Stadium: The PTS Academy Stadium

19 July 2019 Friendly	VfB Lubeck	1–0	Sheffield Wednesday	Lübeck, Germany
19:00 CEST	Hoins 42'	Report		Stadium: Stadion Lohmuhle

21 July 2019 Friendly	Holstein Kiel	2–3	Sheffield Wednesday	Kiel, Germany
14:30 CEST	Serra 17' (pen.); Lee Jae-sung 39'	Report	Rhodes 42'; Fletcher 52', 67'	Stadium: Holstein-Stadion

28 July 2019 Friendly	Sheffield Wednesday	2–2	Espanyol	Owlerton
15:00 BST	Fletcher 24'; Forestieri 79' (pen.)	Report	Puado 29'; Wu Lei 86'	Stadium: Hillsborough

== Competitions ==
=== League table ===
Pos	Team	Pld	W	D	L	GF	GA	GD	Pts
13	Queens Park Rangers	46	16	10	20	67	76	−9	58
14	Reading	46	15	11	20	59	58	+1	56
15	Stoke City	46	16	8	22	62	68	−6	56
16	Sheffield Wednesday	46	15	11	20	58	66	−8	56
17	Middlesbrough	46	13	14	19	48	61	−13	53
18	Huddersfield Town	46	13	12	21	52	70	−18	51
19	Luton Town	46	14	9	23	54	82	−28	51

Source: EFL Official Website
Rules for classification: 1) Points; 2) Goal difference; 3) Number of goals scored; 4) Head-to-head results; 5) Wins; 6) Away goals; 7) Penalty points (sec 9.5); 8) 12-point sending off offences

==== Results summary ====
Overall								Home						Away					
Pld	W	D	L	GF	GA	GD	Pts	W	D	L	GF	GA	GD	W	D	L	GF	GA	GD
46	15	11	20	58	66	−8	56	7	7	9	19	30	−11	8	4	11	39	36	+3

Last updated: 22 July 2020.

==== Results by matchday ====
Matchday	1	2	3	4	5	6	7	8	9	10	11	12	13	14	15	16	17	18	19	20	21	22	23	24	25	26	27	28	29	30	31	32	33	34	35	36	37	38	39	40	41	42	43	44	45	46
Ground	A	H	A	H	A	H	A	H	A	A	H	A	H	H	A	H	A	H	A	H	A	A	H	A	H	H	A	H	A	H	A	A	H	A	H	H	A	H	A	H	A	H	A	H	A	H
Result	W	W	L	W	L	L	W	D	W	L	W	D	W	D	L	D	L	D	W	W	D	W	W	L	L	L	W	L	L	D	D	L	L	D	W	L	L	D	W	L	L	L	W	D	L	L
Position	2	1	6	4	7	11	9	9	7	9	8	8	3	5	7	8	9	10	9	6	8	5	3	4	6	8	6	10	11	11	11	12	12	12	12	12	15	15	13	13	15	16	14	15	16	16

Updated to match(es) played on 22 July 2020. Source: Statto.com
A = Away; H = Home; W = Win; D = Draw; L = Loss

==== Matches ====
On Thursday, 20 June 2019, the EFL Championship fixtures were revealed.

===== August =====
3 August 2019 1	Reading	1–3	Sheffield Wednesday	Reading
15:00 BST	Méïté 54'	Report	Harris 30'; Fletcher (yellow card) 44'; Hutchinson 56' (yellow card) 77'; Reach (yellow card) 61'; Westwood (red card) 80'; Joao 90+7'	Stadium: Madejski Stadium; Attendance: 16,319 (2,149 away); Referee: James Linington

10 August 2019 2	Sheffield Wednesday	2–0	Barnsley	Owlerton, Sheffield
15:00 BST	Murphy 2'; Börner (yellow card) 44'; Fletcher 60'	Report	McGeehan (yellow card) 90'	Stadium: Hillsborough; Attendance: 28,028 (2,500 away); Referee: Tony Harrington

17 August 2019 3	Millwall	1–0	Sheffield Wednesday	Bermondsey
15:00 BST	Smith 37'; Wallace (red card) 43'; Romeo (yellow card) 90+2'	Report	Palmer (yellow card) 56'	Stadium: The Den; Attendance: 15,017 (2,177 away); Referee: Gavin Ward

20 August 2019 4	Sheffield Wednesday	1–0	Luton Town	Owlerton, Sheffield
19:45 BST	Harris 54'; Fletcher (yellow card) 83'; Hutchinson (yellow card) 84'	Report	Pearson (yellow card) 50'	Stadium: Hillsborough; Attendance: 23,353 (764 away); Referee: David Webb

24 August 2019 5	Preston North End	2–1	Sheffield Wednesday	Preston
15:00 BST	Johnson 32' (pen.), 65' (pen.)	Report	Odubajo (yellow card) 64'; Fletcher 78'; Reach (yellow card) 84'; Fox (yellow card) 90+5'	Stadium: Deepdale; Attendance: 15,715 (4,536 away); Referee: Robert Jones

31 August 2019 6	Sheffield Wednesday	1–2	Queens Park Rangers	Owlerton, Sheffield
15:00 BST	Börner (yellow card) 21'; Fletcher 23'; Bannan (yellow card) 26'; Forestieri (yellow card) 45+3'; Iorfa (yellow card) 90+4'	Report	Hugill (yellow card) 26', (goal) 60', 64'; Rangel (yellow card) 43'; Leisnter (yellow card) 90+6'	Stadium: Hillsborough; Attendance: 23,446 (581 away); Referee: John Brooks

===== September =====
15 September 2019 7	Huddersfield Town	0–2	Sheffield Wednesday	Huddersfield
12:00 BST	Chalobah (yellow card) 63'; Hadergjonaj (yellow card) 68'	Report	Fletcher 10' (yellow card) 79'; Hutchinson (yellow card) 55'; Börner (yellow card) 70'; Winnall 72'	Stadium: John Smith's Stadium; Attendance: 22,754 (2,356 away); Referee: Simon Hooper
Note: Live on Sky Sports

21 September 2019 8	Sheffield Wednesday	1–1	Fulham	Owlerton, Sheffield
15:00 BST	Hutchinson (yellow card) 90'; Börner (yellow card) 90+2'; Nuhiu 90+3'	Report	Cairney 42'; Bettinelli (yellow card) 90'	Stadium: Hillsborough; Attendance: 23,342 (1,405 away); Referee: Geoff Eltringham

28 September 2019 9	Middlesbrough	1–4	Sheffield Wednesday	Middlesbrough
15:00 BST	McNair 19'	Report	Clayton 5' (o.g.); Iorfa 6'; Reach 23'; Fletcher 34'; Bannan (yellow card) 72'; Nuhiu (yellow card) 76'; Luongo (yellow card) 88'	Stadium: Riverside Stadium; Attendance: 22,075 (2,857 away); Referee: James Linington

===== October =====
1 October 2019 10	Hull City	1–0	Sheffield Wednesday	Kingston upon Hull
19:45 BST	Eaves 72'; Bowen (yellow card) 86'	Report	Hutchinson (yellow card) 43'; Harris (yellow card) 56'; Nuhiu (yellow card) 58'	Stadium: KCOM Stadium; Attendance: 11,590 (2,112 away); Referee: Andy Davies

5 October 2019 11	Sheffield Wednesday	1–0	Wigan Athletic	Owlerton, Sheffield
15:00 BST	Odubajo (yellow card) 40'; Luongo 57'	Report	Morsy (yellow card) 62'	Stadium: Hillsborough; Attendance: 22,753 (465 away); Referee: Lee Mason

18 October 2019 12	Cardiff City	1–1	Sheffield Wednesday	Leckwith, Cardiff
19:45 BST	Tomlin 87'	Report	Börner 19'; Hutchinson (yellow card) 38'; Palmer (yellow card) 64'; Fox (yellow card) 90+1'	Stadium: Cardiff City Stadium; Attendance: 22,486 (1,224 away); Referee: Keith Stroud
Note: Live on Sky Sports

22 October 2019 13	Sheffield Wednesday	1–0	Stoke City	Owlerton, Sheffield
19:45 BST	Luongo (yellow card) 36' (goal) 43'; Hutchinson (yellow card) 90'	Report		Stadium: Hillsborough; Attendance: 22,460 (1,167 away); Referee: Andy Madley

26 October 2019 14	Sheffield Wednesday	0–0	Leeds United	Owlerton, Sheffield
12:30 BST	Pelupessy (yellow card) 41'; Lee (yellow card) 90'	Report		Stadium: Hillsborough; Attendance: 27,516 (4,500 away); Referee: Tim Robinson
Note: Live on Sky Sports

===== November =====
2 November 2019 15	Blackburn Rovers	2–1	Sheffield Wednesday	Blackburn
15:00 GMT	Adarabioyo 88'; Buckley 90+1'	Report	Murphy 83'	Stadium: Ewood Park; Attendance: 14,147 (2,889 away); Referee: Andy Woolmer

9 November 2019 16	Sheffield Wednesday	2–2	Swansea City	Owlerton, Sheffield
15:00 GMT	Lee (yellow card) 69'; Forestieri 81'; Fox 90+1'	Report	Ayew 32'; Wilmot 90+4'	Stadium: Hillsborough; Attendance: 23,073 (785 away); Referee: David Webb

23 November 2019 17	West Bromwich Albion	2–1	Sheffield Wednesday	West Bromwich
15:00 GMT	Robson-Kanu 10'; Phillips (yellow card) 63'; Austin 88' (pen.)	Report	Lee (yellow card) 23'; Hutchinson (yellow card) 42'; Fletcher 58' (pen.); Harris (yellow card) 60'; Palmer (red card) 90+2'	Stadium: The Hawthorns; Attendance: 25,566 (1,982 away); Referee: Tony Harrington

27 November 2019 18	Sheffield Wednesday	1–1	Birmingham City	Owlerton, Sheffield
19:45 GMT	Börner (yellow card) 12'; Harris 81'	Report	Giménez 48'; Roberts (yellow card) 78'; Colin (yellow card) 84'	Stadium: Hillsborough; Attendance: 22,059 (919 away); Referee: Peter Bankes

30 November 2019 19	Charlton Athletic	1–3	Sheffield Wednesday	Charlton
12:30 GMT	Bonne 26'; Phillips (yellow card) 81'; Lockyer (yellow card) 89'	Report	Fletcher 17', 80' (pen.); Hutchinson (yellow card) 38'; Nuhiu (yellow card) 84' (goal) 90+4'	Stadium: The Valley; Attendance: 18,338 (2,680 away); Referee: Tim Robinson
Note: Live on Sky Sports

===== December =====
7 December 2019 20	Sheffield Wednesday	2–1	Brentford	Owlerton, Sheffield
15:00 GMT	Fletcher 69' (pen.), 73' (yellow card) 73'	Report	Mbeumo 29'; Henry (yellow card) 68'; Pinnock (yellow card) 82'	Stadium: Hillsborough; Attendance: 22,475 (435 away); Referee: Dean Whitestone

11 December 2019 21	Derby County	1–1	Sheffield Wednesday	Derby
19:45 GMT	Evans (yellow card) 25'; Knight (yellow card) 50'; Martin 82' (pen.); Lawrence (yellow card) 83'	Report	Reach (yellow card) 11'; Fletcher 23'; Odubajo (yellow card) 66' (yellow-red card) 90'; Hutchinson (yellow card) 83'; Nuhiu (yellow card) 90+5'	Stadium: Pride Park Stadium; Attendance: 26,203 (2,488 away); Referee: Steve Martin
Note: Live on Sky Sports

14 December 2019 22	Nottingham Forest	0-4	Sheffield Wednesday	West Bridgford
15:00 GMT		Report	Rhodes 9', 13', 37'; Fletcher 45+3'	Stadium: City Ground; Attendance: 28,002 (1,993 away); Referee: James Linington

22 December 2019 23	Sheffield Wednesday	1–0	Bristol City	Owlerton, Sheffield
12:00 GMT	Luongo (yellow card) 70'; Bannan 85' (pen.)	Report	Smith (yellow card) 11'; Palmer (yellow card) 81'; Bentley (yellow card) 84'	Stadium: Hillsborough; Attendance: 23,180 (402 away); Referee: Tony Harrington
Note: Live on Sky Sports

26 December 2019 24	Stoke City	3–2	Sheffield Wednesday	Stoke-on-Trent
15:00 GMT	McClean 11'; Campbell 90+3'; Vokes 90+7'	Report	Harris (yellow card) 45+2'; Fox 67'; Lees 74'; Bannan (yellow card) 76'	Stadium: bet365 Stadium; Attendance: 25,359 (2,885 away); Referee: John Brooks

29 December 2019 25	Sheffield Wednesday	1–2	Cardiff City	Owlerton, Sheffield
15:00 GMT	Lees 18'; Harris (yellow card) 51'	Report	Glatzel 5'; Hoilett 8' (yellow card) 61'; Richards (yellow card) 67'	Stadium: Hillsborough; Attendance: 25,385 (893 away); Referee: Tim Robinson

===== January =====
1 January 2020 26	Sheffield Wednesday	0–1	Hull City	Owlerton, Sheffield
15:00 GMT	Börner (yellow card) 26'; Bannan (yellow card) 90'	Report	Bowen 61'; Grosicki (yellow card) 79'	Stadium: Hillsborough; Attendance: 24,842 (1,338 away); Referee: Jeremy Simpson

11 January 2020 27	Leeds United	0–2	Sheffield Wednesday	Leeds
15:00 GMT	Alioski (yellow card) 76'	Report	Nuhiu (yellow card) 71' (goal) 90+4'; Murphy 87'; Lee (yellow card) 88'	Stadium: Elland Road; Attendance: 36,422 (2,644 away); Referee: Oliver Langford

18 January 2020 28	Sheffield Wednesday	0–5	Blackburn Rovers	Owlerton, Sheffield
15:00 GMT	Börner (yellow card) 14'; Luongo (red card) 23'	Report	Holtby 19', 45+1'; Dawson 36' (o.g.); Lenihan 48'; Rothwell (yellow card) 55'; Gallagher 90+2'	Stadium: Hillsborough; Attendance: 23,504 (838 away); Referee: Jarred Gillett

28 January 2020 29	Wigan Athletic	2–1	Sheffield Wednesday	Wigan
19:45 GMT	Moore 56'; Lowe 90'	Report	Murphy 32'	Stadium: DW Stadium; Attendance: 9,759 (1,747 away); Referee: David Webb

===== February =====
1 February 2020 30	Sheffield Wednesday	0–0	Millwall	Owlerton, Sheffield
15:00 GMT	Reach (yellow card) 23'; Bannan (yellow card) 32'; Iorfa (yellow card) 53'; Odubajo (yellow card) 90+2'	Report	Williams (yellow card) 18'; Wallace (yellow card) 49'; Cooper (yellow card) 62'	Stadium: Hillsborough; Attendance: 23,052 (1,248 away); Referee: David Coote

8 February 2020 31	Barnsley	1–1	Sheffield Wednesday	Barnsley
13:30 GMT	Woodrow 24'; Styles (yellow card) 80'	Report	Windass 16'; Da Cruz (yellow card) 87'; Lee (yellow card) 90+2'	Stadium: Oakwell; Attendance: 17,789 (4,677 away); Referee: Tim Robinson

12 February 2020 32	Luton Town	1–0	Sheffield Wednesday	Luton
19:45 GMT	Collins (penalty missed) 2' 23'; Brown (yellow card) 45'; Bree (yellow card) 78'; Rea (yellow card) 90+1'	Report	Wickham (yellow card) 31'	Stadium: Kenilworth Road; Attendance: 10,001 (1,018 away); Referee: Gavin Ward

15 February 2020 33	Sheffield Wednesday	0–3	Reading	Owlerton, Sheffield
15:00 GMT	Urhoghide (yellow card) 16' (yellow-red card) 49'	Report	Méïté 21'; Ejaria (yellow card) 67'; Pușcaș 72'; Yiadom (yellow card) 81'; Baldock 90+1' (pen.)	Stadium: Hillsborough; Attendance: 22,199 (532 away); Referee: Andy Woolmer

22 February 2020 34	Birmingham City	3–3	Sheffield Wednesday	Bordesley, Birmingham
15:00 GMT	Murphy 6' (o.g.); Jutkiewicz 30'; Gardner (yellow card) 43'; Hogan 90+1'	Report	Bannan 20' (yellow card) 64'; Lees (yellow card) 27'; Forestieri 34' (pen.) (yellow card) 45+2'; Murphy 65'; Fletcher (yellow card) 74'; Fox (yellow card) 86'	Stadium: St Andrew's; Attendance: 22,120 (2,614 away); Referee: John Brooks

26 February 2020 35	Sheffield Wednesday	1–0	Charlton Athletic	Owlerton, Sheffield
19:45 GMT	Forestieri (yellow card) 67'; Nuhiu (yellow card) 82'; Fletcher 90+5'	Report	Doughty (yellow card) 19'; Lockyer (yellow card) 22'; Lapslie (yellow card) 90+4'	Stadium: Hillsborough; Attendance: 21,370 (506 away); Referee: Oliver Langford

29 February 2020 36	Sheffield Wednesday	1–3	Derby County	Owlerton, Sheffield
15:00 GMT	Bannan (yellow card) 41'; Windass 74'; Iorfa (yellow card) 87'	Report	Lawrence 7', 24'; Knight 30'; Shinnie (yellow card) 82'	Stadium: Hillsborough; Attendance: 25,148 (2,492 away); Referee: Dean Whitestone

===== March =====
7 March 2020 37	Brentford	5–0	Sheffield Wednesday	Brentford
15:00 GMT	Dasilva 10', 73'; Marcondes 18'; Mbeumo 40'; Fosu 82'	Report	Bannan (yellow card) 35'; Fletcher (yellow card) 50'	Stadium: Griffin Park; Attendance: 12,273 (1,637 away); Referee: Keith Stroud

5 days later after 5-0 loss at Brentford EFL was suspended due to COVID-19 Pandemic

===== June =====
20 June 2020 38	Sheffield Wednesday	1–1	Nottingham Forest	Owlerton, Sheffield
15:00 GMT	Luongo (yellow card) 62'; Odubajo (yellow card) 71'; Wickham 90+3'; Iorfa (yellow card) 90+4'	Report	Worrall (yellow card) 68'; Lolley 69'; Cash (yellow card) 72'; Silva (yellow card) 78'	Stadium: Hillsborough; Referee: Robert Jones
Note: Rescheduled from 14 March 2020, due to the COVID-19 pandemic.

28 June 2020 39	Bristol City	1–2	Sheffield Wednesday	Ashton Gate
12:00 GMT	O'Dowda (yellow card) 45'; Wells 68'	Report	Wickham 13'; Rhodes (yellow card) 24'; Lee (yellow card) 39'; Luongo 59'	Stadium: Ashton Gate Stadium; Referee: John Brooks
Note: Rescheduled from 17 March 2020, due to the COVID-19 pandemic. Live on Sky Sports

===== July =====
1 July 2020 40	Sheffield Wednesday	0–3	West Bromwich Albion	Owlerton, Sheffield
19:45 GMT		Report	Austin 37' (pen.) (yellow card) 66'; Sawyers (yellow card) 53'; Pereira 58', 85' (yellow card) 80'; O'Shea (yellow card) 61'	Stadium: Hillsborough; Referee: David Webb
Note: Rescheduled from 21 March 2020, due to the COVID-19 pandemic.

5 July 2020 41	Swansea City	2–1	Sheffield Wednesday	Swansea
12:00 GMT	Fulton (yellow card) 33'; Brewster 52'; Routledge (yellow card) 58'; Ayew 66' (pen.)	Report	Reach (yellow card) 65'; Nuhiu 90+4'	Stadium: Liberty Stadium; Referee: Stephen Martin
Note: Rescheduled from 4 April 2020, due to the COVID-19 pandemic. Live on Sky Sports

8 July 2020 42	Sheffield Wednesday	1–3	Preston North End	Owlerton, Sheffield
19:45 BST	Pelupessy (yellow card) 10'; Murphy 58'; Nuhiu (yellow card) 85'	Report	Sinclair 78'; Stockley 87'; Potts 90+6'	Stadium: Hillsborough; Referee: Tony Harrington
Note: Rescheduled from 10 April 2020, due to the COVID-19 pandemic.

11 July 2020 43	Queens Park Rangers	0–3	Sheffield Wednesday	Shepherd's Bush
15:00 BST	Ball (yellow card) 35'	Report	Iorfa 5'; Hunt (yellow card) 30'; Windass 45+2'; Odubajo (yellow card) 57'; Murphy 78'	Stadium: Loftus Road; Referee: Oliver Langford
Note: Rescheduled from 13 April 2020, due to the COVID-19 pandemic.

14 July 2020 44	Sheffield Wednesday	0–0	Huddersfield Town	Owlerton, Sheffield
19:45 BST	Pelupessy (yellow card) 90+1'	Report	Hogg (yellow card) 72'	Stadium: Hillsborough; Referee: Dean Whitestone
Note: Rescheduled from 18 April 2020, due to the COVID-19 pandemic.

18 July 2020 45	Fulham	5–3	Sheffield Wednesday	Fulham
15:00 BST	Kebano 11', 73'; Mitrović 26', 41' (pen.); Reid (yellow card) 84', (goal) 90+1'; Reed (yellow card) 90+1' (yellow-red card) 90+4'	Report	Nuhiu 49' (pen.), 89'; Murphy 78'	Stadium: Craven Cottage; Referee: Darren England
Note: Rescheduled from 25 April 2020, due to the COVID-19 pandemic.

22 July 2020 46	Sheffield Wednesday	1–2	Middlesbrough	Owlerton, Sheffield
19:30 BST	Murphy 10'	Report	McNair 22'; Assombalonga 90+3'	Stadium: Hillsborough; Referee: Jarred Gillett
Note: Rescheduled from 2 May 2020, due to the COVID-19 pandemic.

=== FA Cup ===
4 January 2020 Third Round	Brighton & Hove Albion	0–1	Sheffield Wednesday	Falmer, Brighton
15:01 GMT		Report	Reach 65'	Stadium: AMEX Stadium; Attendance: 20,349; Referee: Andre Marriner

24 January 2020 Fourth Round	Queens Park Rangers	1–2	Sheffield Wednesday	Shepherd's Bush
20:00 GMT	Ball (yellow card) 60'; Osayi-Samuel (yellow card) 86'; Wells 90+3'	Report	Fox 43'; Winnall 90+1'	Stadium: Kiyan Prince Foundation Stadium; Attendance: 11,871; Referee: Keith Stroud

4 March 2020 Fifth Round	Sheffield Wednesday	0–1	Manchester City	Owlerton, Sheffield
19:45 GMT	Palmer (yellow card) 36'	Report	Agüero 53'; Mahrez (yellow card) 88'	Stadium: Hillsborough Stadium; Attendance: 20,995; Referee: Michael Oliver

=== EFL Cup ===
13 August 2019 First round	Sheffield Wednesday	w/o	Bury	Owlerton, Sheffield
19:45 BST				Stadium: Hillsborough Stadium
Note: The match was suspended by the Football League on 8 August 2019 due to Bury's financial issues. On 20 August 2019 Sheffield Wednesday were awarded a bye as Bury were unable to fulfil the fixture.

28 August 2019 Second round	Rotherham United	0–1	Sheffield Wednesday	Rotherham
19:45 BST	Barlaser (yellow card) 54'	Report	Pelupessy (yellow card) 58'; Bannan (yellow card) 85'; Nuhiu 90+6'	Stadium: AESSEAL New York Stadium; Attendance: 8,679; Referee: Charles Breakspear

24 September 2019 Third round	Sheffield Wednesday	0–2	Everton	Owlerton, Sheffield
19:45 BST		Report	Calvert-Lewin 6', 10'; Delph (yellow card) 37'	Stadium: Hillsborough; Attendance: 21,485; Referee: Jeremy Simpson

== Squad statistics ==
=== Appearances ===
As of 22 July 2020

No.	Pos	Nat	Player	Total		Championship		FA Cup		League Cup	
No.	Pos	Nat	Player	Apps	Goals	Apps	Goals	Apps	Goals	Apps	Goals
1	GK	(Republic of Ireland) IRL	Keiren Westwood	14	0	14	0	0	0	0	0
2	DF	(Scotland) SCO	Liam Palmer	34	0	33	0	1	0	0	0
3	DF	(Wales) WAL	Morgan Fox	32	3	24+3	2	3	1	2	0
5	MF	(England) ENG	Kieran Lee	30	0	20+8	0	2	0	0	0
6	FW	(Scotland) SCO	Jordan Rhodes	19	3	7+9	3	1	0	1+1	0
7	MF	(England) ENG	Kadeem Harris	47	3	40+3	3	1+1	0	0+2	0
8	MF	(Netherlands) NED	Joey Pelupessy	22	0	11+6	0	3	0	2	0
9	FW	(Scotland) SCO	Steven Fletcher	30	13	23+4	13	1+1	0	0+1	0
10	MF	(Scotland) SCO	Barry Bannan	46	2	42+2	2	1	0	0+1	0
11	FW	(England) ENG	Sam Winnall	17	2	6+7	1	1+1	1	2	0
13	DF	(Germany) GER	Julian Börner	40	1	34+3	1	3	0	0	0
14	MF	(England) ENG	Jacob Murphy	44	9	25+14	9	3	0	2	0
15	DF	(England) ENG	Tom Lees	30	2	24+3	2	1+2	0	0	0
17	FW	(Kosovo) KOS	Atdhe Nuhiu	41	7	14+24	6	0+1	0	2	1
19	FW	(England) ENG	Connor Wickham	13	2	8+5	2	0	0	0	0
20	MF	(England) ENG	Adam Reach	39	2	26+10	1	1+1	1	1	0
21	MF	(Australia) AUS	Massimo Luongo	30	3	17+10	3	1	0	2	0
22	DF	(England) ENG	Moses Odubajo	24	0	19+3	0	1	0	1	0
23	MF	(England) ENG	Sam Hutchinson	24	1	20+3	1	1	0	0	0
25	GK	(England) ENG	Cameron Dawson	28	0	23+1	0	2	0	2	0
26	DF	(Scotland) SCO	David Bates	1	0	0	0	0	0	1	0
27	DF	(England) ENG	Dominic Iorfa	45	2	40+1	2	2	0	2	0
28	GK	(England) ENG	Joe Wildsmith	10	0	9	0	1	0	0	0
29	MF	(England) ENG	Alex Hunt	8	0	2+4	0	0+2	0	0	0
38	MF	(Netherlands) NED	Alessio Da Cruz	15	0	8+6	0	1	0	0	0
44	DF	(England) ENG	Osaze Urhoghide	4	0	3	0	1	0	0	0
45	FW	(Italy) ITA	Fernando Forestieri	19	2	8+9	2	1	0	0+1	0
46	MF	(England) ENG	Liam Shaw	2	0	1+1	0	0	0	0	0
47	MF	(England) ENG	Josh Windass	9	3	6+3	3	0	0	0	0
Players that left the club mid-season:
12	DF	(England) ENG	Jordan Thorniley	2	0	0	0	0	0	2	0
18	FW	(Portugal) POR	Lucas João	1	1	0+1	1	0	0	0	0

=== Goalscorers ===
As of 22 July 2020

Includes all competitive matches.

Rank	Pos.	Nat.	No.	Player	Championship	FA Cup	League Cup	Total
1	FW	(Scotland)	9	Steven Fletcher	13	0	0	13
2	MF	(England)	14	Jacob Murphy	9	0	0	9
3	FW	(Kosovo)	17	Atdhe Nuhiu	6	0	1	7
4	DF	(Wales)	3	Morgan Fox	2	1	0	3
4	FW	(Scotland)	6	Jordan Rhodes	3	0	0	3
4	MF	(England)	7	Kadeem Harris	3	0	0	3
4	MF	(Australia)	21	Massimo Luongo	3	0	0	3
4	FW	(England)	47	Josh Windass	3	0	0	3
5	MF	(Scotland)	10	Barry Bannan	2	0	0	2
5	FW	(England)	11	Sam Winnall	1	1	0	2
5	DF	(England)	15	Tom Lees	2	0	0	2
5	FW	(England)	19	Connor Wickham	2	0	0	2
5	MF	(England)	20	Adam Reach	1	1	0	2
5	DF	(England)	27	Dominic Iorfa	2	0	0	2
5	FW	(Italy)	45	Fernando Forestieri	2	0	0	2
6	DF	(Germany)	13	Julian Börner	1	0	0	1
6	FW	(Portugal)	18	Lucas João	1	0	0	1
6	MF	(England)	23	Sam Hutchinson	1	0	0	1
6	Own Goals				1	0	0	1
Total					58	3	1	62

=== Disciplinary record ===
As of 22 July 2020

No.	Pos.	Name	Championship		FA Cup		League Cup		Total	
No.	Pos.	Name	Booked	Sent off (straight red)	Booked	Sent off (straight red)	Booked	Sent off (straight red)	Booked	Sent off (straight red)
22	DF	Moses Odubajo	6	1	0	0	0	0	6	1
21	MF	Massimo Luongo	4	1	0	0	0	0	4	1
2	DF	Liam Palmer	2	1	1	0	0	0	3	1
44	DF	Osaze Urhoghide	1	1	0	0	0	0	1	1
1	GK	Keiren Westwood	0	1	0	0	0	0	0	1
23	MF	Sam Hutchinson	10	0	0	0	0	0	10	0
10	MF	Barry Bannan	8	0	0	0	1	0	9	0
13	DF	Julian Börner	7	0	0	0	0	0	7	0
17	FW	Atdhe Nuhiu	7	0	0	0	0	0	7	0
5	MF	Kieran Lee	6	0	0	0	0	0	6	0
9	FW	Steven Fletcher	6	0	0	0	0	0	6	0
20	MF	Adam Reach	5	0	0	0	0	0	5	0
7	MF	Kadeem Harris	4	0	0	0	0	0	4	0
8	MF	Joey Pelupessy	3	0	0	0	1	0	4	0
27	DF	Dominic Iorfa	4	0	0	0	0	0	4	0
3	DF	Morgan Fox	3	0	0	0	0	0	3	0
45	FW	Fernando Forestieri	3	0	0	0	0	0	3	0
6	FW	Jordan Rhodes	1	0	0	0	0	0	1	0
11	FW	Sam Winnall	0	0	1	0	0	0	1	0
15	DF	Tom Lees	1	0	0	0	0	0	1	0
19	FW	Connor Wickham	1	0	0	0	0	0	1	0
29	MF	Alex Hunt	1	0	0	0	0	0	1	0
38	MF	Alessio Da Cruz	1	0	0	0	0	0	1	0

=== Clean sheets ===
As of 22 July 2020

No.	Nat.	Player	Matches Played	Clean Sheet %	League	FA Cup	EFL Cup	TOTAL
1	(Republic of Ireland)	Keiren Westwood	14	28.57%	4	0	0	4
25	(England)	Cameron Dawson	28	35.71%	8	1	1	10
28	(England)	Joe Wildsmith	10	20%	2	0	0	2
36	(England)	Paul Jones	0	0%	0	0	0	0

== Awards ==
=== Player of the Month ===
Player of the Month awards for the 2019–20 season.

Month	First	%	Second	%	Third	%	Ref
August	(Germany) Julian Börner	35.79%	(England) Kadeem Harris	35.55%	(Scotland) Steven Fletcher	10.73%	
September	(Scotland) Steven Fletcher	31%	(Germany) Julian Börner	19%	(Kosovo) Atdhe Nuhiu	14%	
October	(Wales) Morgan Fox	35%	(England) Dominic Iorfa	31%	(Germany) Julian Börner	15%	
November	(England) Dominic Iorfa	62%	(Scotland) Steven Fletcher	13%	(Scotland) Barry Bannan	10%	
December	(Scotland) Steven Fletcher	27%	(Scotland) Barry Bannan	19%	(England) Dominic Iorfa	17%	
January	(Wales) Morgan Fox	47%	(England) Dominic Iorfa	23%	(England) Jacob Murphy	11%	
February	(England) Jacob Murphy	36%	(England) Josh Windass	15%	(Italy) Fernando Forestieri	14%	

=== Player of the Year ===
Player of the Year award for the 2019–20 season.

Winner	Ref
(England) Dominic Iorfa	
