= 2018–19 Sheffield Wednesday F.C. season =

English football club season

Sheffield Wednesday
2018–19 season
- Chairman: Dejphon Chansiri
- Manager: Jos Luhukay (until 21 December); Lee Bullen (caretaker) (21 December–2 January); Steve Agnew & Stephen Clemence (caretaker) (2 January–1 February); Steve Bruce (from 1 February)
- Stadium: Hillsborough, Owlerton
- Championship: 12th
- FA Cup: Fourth round (Eliminated by Chelsea)
- EFL Cup: Second round (Eliminated by Wolverhampton Wanderers)
- Top goalscorer: League: Steven Fletcher (11); All: Steven Fletcher (11)
- Highest home attendance: 31,630 (vs. Sheffield United; Championship)
- Lowest home attendance: 13,597 (vs. Wolverhampton Wanderers; EFL Cup)
- Average home league attendance: 24,429
- Biggest win: 3–0 (vs. Nottingham Forest, 9 April, Championship)
- Biggest defeat: 0–4 (vs. Norwich City, 3 November, Championship)
Home colours	Away colours	Third colours

The 2018–19 season was Sheffield Wednesday's seventh consecutive season in the Championship. Along with competing in the Championship, the club also participated in the FA Cup and EFL Cup.

The season covered the period from 1 July 2018 to 30 June 2019.

== Player transfers and contracts ==
=== Transfers in ===
Date from	Position	Nationality	Name	From	Fee	Ref.
16 August 2018	GK	(England)	Cameron McCulloch	Unattched	Free	
2 January 2019	FW	(England)	Omar Damba	(England) RIASA	Free	
31 January 2019	DF	(England)	Dominic Iorfa	(England) Wolverhampton Wanderers	Undisclosed	

=== Transfers out ===
Date from	Position	Nationality	Name	To	Fee	Ref.
1 July 2018	CB	(Netherlands)	Glenn Loovens	(England) Sunderland	Released	
1 July 2018	MF	(Scotland)	Ross Wallace	(England) Fleetwood Town	Released	
1 July 2018	GK	(England)	Jake Kean	(England) Mansfield Town	Released	
1 July 2018	FW	(England)	George Hirst	(Belgium) OH Leuven	Free transfer	
6 July 2018	FB	(England)	Jack Hunt	(England) Bristol City	Undisclosed	
16 September 2018	MF	(England)	Sean Clare	(Scotland) Heart of Midlothian	Free transfer	

=== Loans in ===
Start date	Position	Nationality	Name	From	End date	Ref.
31 August 2018	MF	(England)	Josh Onomah	(England) Tottenham Hotspur	End of Season	
31 August 2018	DF	(Jamaica)	Michael Hector	(England) Chelsea	End of Season	
31 January 2019	MF	(England)	Rolando Aarons	(England) Newcastle United	End of Season	
31 January 2019	DF	(Morocco)	Achraf Lazaar	(England) Newcastle United	End of Season	

=== Loans out ===
Start date	Position	Nationality	Name	To	End date	Ref.
10 July 2018	FW	(Scotland)	Jordan Rhodes	(England) Norwich City	End of Season	
18 September 2018	GK	(England)	Dan Wallis	(England) Frickley Athletic	October 2018	
28 March 2019	MF	(England)	Ben Hughes	(England) Gainsborough Trinity	End of Season	

=== New contracts ===
Date from	Position	Nationality	Name	Length	Expiry	Ref.
22 August 2018	FW	(Portugal)	Lucas João	3 years	June 2021	
29 August 2018	MF	(Scotland)	Barry Bannan	3 years	June 2021	
31 October 2018	DF	(England)	Matt Penney	2 years	June 2020	
11 December 2018	MF	(Republic of Ireland)	Conor Grant	—	—	
19 December 2018	DF	(England)	Isaac Rice	2 1/2 years	June 2021	
20 December 2018	DF	(England)	Josh Dawodu	2 1/2 years	June 2021	
21 December 2018	MF	(England)	Liam Shaw	2 1/2 years	June 2021	

== Competitions ==
=== Friendlies ===
As of 13 June 2018, Sheffield Wednesday have announced three pre-season friendlies against Lincoln City, Mansfield Town and Villarreal CF

13 July 2018 Friendly	Lincoln City	0–1	Sheffield Wednesday	Lincoln
19:30 BST		Report	Forestieri 55'	Stadium: Sincil Bank; Attendance: 5,846

21 July 2018 Friendly	Sheffield Wednesday	1–0	NAC Breda	Manchester
12:00 BST	Nuhiu 12'	Report		Stadium: Academy Stadium

24 July 2018 Friendly	Mansfield Town	2–1	Sheffield Wednesday	Mansfield
19:30 BST	Benning 41'; Reach 67' (o.g.)	Report	Reach 72'	Stadium: One Call Stadium; Attendance: 3,599

28 July 2018 Friendly	Sheffield Wednesday	1–3	Villarreal	Owlerton
15:00 BST	Palmer 33'	Report	Moreno 18'; Funes Mori 48'; Ekambi 69'	Stadium: Hillsborough

=== Championship ===
==== League table ====
Pos	Team	Pld	W	D	L	GF	GA	GD	Pts
9	Nottingham Forest	46	17	15	14	61	54	+7	66
10	Swansea City	46	18	11	17	65	62	+3	65
11	Brentford	46	17	13	16	73	59	+14	64 (Note: Brentford were awarded a 1–0 win over Bolton due to Bolton's inability to hold the fixture.)
12	Sheffield Wednesday	46	16	16	14	60	62	−2	64
13	Hull City	46	17	11	18	66	68	−2	62
14	Preston North End	46	16	13	17	67	67	0	61
15	Blackburn Rovers	46	16	12	18	64	69	−5	60

Source: Sky Sports Archived 25 September 2019 at the Wayback Machine
Rules for classification: 1) Points; 2) Goal difference; 3) Number of goals scored; 4) Head-to-head results

==== Results summary ====
Overall								Home						Away					
Pld	W	D	L	GF	GA	GD	Pts	W	D	L	GF	GA	GD	W	D	L	GF	GA	GD
46	16	16	14	60	62	−2	64	10	8	5	34	27	+7	6	8	9	26	35	−9

Last updated: 5 May 2019.

==== Results by matchday ====
Matchday	1	2	3	4	5	6	7	8	9	10	11	12	13	14	15	16	17	18	19	20	21	22	23	24	25	26	27	28	29	30	31	32	33	34	35	36	37	38	39	40	41	42	43	44	45	46
Ground	A	H	A	H	H	A	H	A	A	H	H	A	H	A	A	H	A	H	H	A	H	A	H	A	A	H	A	H	A	H	A	A	H	H	H	A	A	H	A	H	H	A	A	H	A	H
Result	L	D	L	W	W	W	D	L	W	D	D	W	L	L	L	L	D	L	W	L	D	L	W	W	D	D	L	W	W	D	D	D	W	W	D	D	W	W	D	L	W	L	D	W	D	L
Position	17	18	21	17	14	11	9	13	10	12	12	6	11	14	15	17	17	18	14	16	17	18	17	16	16	16	16	16	16	16	16	15	15	12	13	13	11	10	11	12	10	10	11	9	10	12

Updated to match(es) played on 5 May 2019. Source: Statto.com
A = Away; H = Home; W = Win; D = Draw; L = Loss

==== Matches ====
===== August =====
4 August 2018 1	Wigan Athletic	3–2	Sheffield Wednesday	Wigan, Greater Manchester
15:00 BST	Jacobs 11', 26'; Powell 60'; Dunkley (yellow card) 84'	Report	Nuhiu 20', (yellow card) 79' (yellow-red card); Palmer (yellow card) 34'; Forestieri 67'; Bannan (yellow card) 86'	Stadium: DW Stadium; Attendance: 14,207 (4,744 away); Referee: Tim Robinson

11 August 2018 2	Sheffield Wednesday	1–1	Hull City	Owlerton, Sheffield
15:00 BST	Fox (yellow card) 44'; Forestieri 51' (pen.); Baker (yellow card) 58'; Bannan (yellow card) 74'	Report	de Wijs (yellow card) 21'; Campbell 36'	Stadium: Hillsborough; Attendance: 23,416 (865 away); Referee: Stuart Attwell

19 August 2018 3	Brentford	2–0	Sheffield Wednesday	Brentford, London
15:00 BST	Maupay 20'; Dalsgaard (yellow card) 55'; Watkins 61'	Report	Baker (yellow card) 62'	Stadium: Griffin Park; Attendance: 10,134 (1,692 away); Referee: David Webb

22 August 2018 4	Sheffield Wednesday	2–1	Millwall	Owlerton, Sheffield
19:45 BST	Bannan 16'; Lees 46'; Reach (yellow card) 63'; Forestieri (yellow card) 90+1'	Report	Tunnicliffe 72'	Stadium: Hillsborough; Attendance: 21,349 (353 away); Referee: Andy Madley

25 August 2018 5	Sheffield Wednesday	2–1	Ipswich Town	Owlerton, Sheffield
15:00 BST	João 16' 77'; Bannan (yellow card) 43'; Nuhiu (yellow card) 45'	Report	Harrison (yellow card) 14'; Nsiala 40' (red card) 75'; Knudsen (yellow card) 70'	Stadium: Hillsborough; Attendance: 22,499 (724 away); Referee: Jeremy Simpson

===== September =====
1 September 2018 6	Reading	1–2	Sheffield Wednesday	Reading
15:00 BST	Moore 64'; Sims (yellow card) 87'	Report	Reach 12'; Penney (yellow card) 19'; João 46'	Stadium: Madjeski Stadium; Attendance: 14,352 (1,933 away); Referee: Gavin Ward

15 September 2018 7	Sheffield Wednesday	2–2	Stoke City	Owlerton, Sheffield
15:00 BST	Matias 24'; Bannan 82' (yellow card) 87'	Report	Afobe 2' 22'	Stadium: Hillsborough; Attendance: 24,905 (2,055 away); Referee: Geoff Eltringham

19 September 2018 8	Nottingham Forest	2–1	Sheffield Wednesday	Nottingham
19:45 BST	Grabban 41', (yellow card) 45+1'; Carvalho 63'; Robinson (yellow card) 78'	Report	Fletcher 88'	Stadium: City Ground; Attendance: 26,252 (1,995 away); Referee: Tony Harrington

22 September 2018 9	Aston Villa	1–2	Sheffield Wednesday	Aston, Birmingham
15:00 BST	Chester (yellow card) 8'; McGinn 53' (yellow card) 55'	Report	Baker (yellow card) 36'; Matias 49'; Fletcher 67'	Stadium: Villa Park; Attendance: 35,572 (2,600 away); Referee: David Webb

28 September 2018 10	Sheffield Wednesday	1–1	Leeds United	Owlerton, Sheffield
19:45 BST	Penney (yellow card) 33'; Reach 45'; Bannan (yellow card) 72'	Report	Klich 54' (yellow card) 73'	Stadium: Hillsborough; Attendance: 26,717 (4,600 away); Referee: Robert Jones

===== October =====
3 October 2018 11	Sheffield Wednesday	2–2	West Bromwich Albion	Owlerton, Sheffield
19:45 BST	Reach 24'; Forestieri 41'; Nuhiu (yellow card) 69'; Dawson (yellow card) 72'	Report	Livermore (yellow card) 49'; Bartley (yellow card) 55'; Dawson (yellow card) 67'; Pelupessy 86' (o.g.); Barnes 87'	Stadium: Hillsborough; Attendance: 22,150 (814 away); Referee: Oliver Langford

7 October 2018 12	Bristol City	1–2	Sheffield Wednesday	Ashton Gate, Bristol
13:30 BST	Taylor 80'; Weimann (yellow card) 82'	Report	Lees (yellow card) 59'; Joao 64' 66' (yellow card) 90+3'; Palmer (yellow card) 68'; Hector (yellow card) 89'; Forestieri (yellow card) 90+8'	Stadium: Ashton Gate; Attendance: 20,102 (1,719 away); Referee: Andy Davies

19 October 2018 13	Sheffield Wednesday	1–2	Middlesbrough	Owlerton, Sheffield
19:45 BST	Reach 82'	Report	Bešić 49'; Assombalonga 55'	Stadium: Hillsborough; Attendance: 23,284 (1,558 away); Referee: Peter Bankes

23 October 2018 14	Queens Park Rangers	3–0	Sheffield Wednesday	Shepherd's Bush, London
19:45 BST	Hemed 35'; Freeman 57'; Wells 83'	Report		Stadium: Loftus Road; Attendance: 12,534 (1,636 away); Referee: John Brooks

27 October 2018 15	Birmingham City	3–1	Sheffield Wednesday	Bordesley, Birmingham
19:45 BST	Mahoney 43'; Jutkiewicz 80'; Adams 84'	Report	Fletcher 19'; Pelupessy (yellow card) 68'	Stadium: St Andrews; Attendance: 23,659 (2,764 away); Referee: Darren Bond

===== November =====
3 November 2018 16	Sheffield Wednesday	0–4	Norwich City	Owlerton, Sheffield
15:00 GMT	Bannan (yellow card) 45+2'; Nuhiu (yellow card) 70'; João (yellow card) 74'; Penney (yellow card) 77'	Report	Buendía (yellow card) 45+2', (goal) 56'; Pukki 51', 62'; Leitner (yellow card) 61'; Srbeny 80'	Stadium: Hillsborough; Attendance: 23,425 (1,388 away); Referee: Steve Martin

9 November 2018 17	Sheffield United	0–0	Sheffield Wednesday	Sheffield
19:45 GMT		Report	Bannan (yellow card) 71'; Baker (yellow card) 86'; Hector (yellow card) 89'	Stadium: Bramall Lane; Attendance: 30,261 (2,190 away); Referee: Andrew Madley

24 November 2018 18	Sheffield Wednesday	1–2	Derby County	Owlerton, Sheffield
15:00 GMT	Reach 12'	Report	Wilson 29'; Marriott 35'	Stadium: Hillsborough; Attendance: 25,204 (2,954 away); Referee: Jeremy Simpson

27 November 2018 19	Sheffield Wednesday	1–0	Bolton Wanderers	Owlerton, Sheffield
19:45 GMT	Lees 57'	Report		Stadium: Hillsborough Stadium; Attendance: 20,861 (224 away); Referee: Gavin Ward

===== December =====
1 December 2018 20	Blackburn Rovers	4–2	Sheffield Wednesday	Blackburn
15:00 GMT	Graham 11', 66', 90'; Downing (yellow card) 39'; Dack 53'	Report	Bannan (yellow card) 57'; Lucas João 62'; Raya 85' (o.g.)	Stadium: Ewood Park; Attendance: 15,154 (3,578 away); Referee: Robert Jones

8 December 2018 21	Sheffield Wednesday	2–2	Rotherham United	Owlerton, Sheffield
15:00 GMT	Bannan (yellow card) 20'; João 45+1', 64'	Report	Smith 46'; Towell 55'	Stadium: Hillsborough; Attendance: 24,725 (2,406 away); Referee: Darren Bond

15 December 2018 22	Swansea City	2–1	Sheffield Wednesday	Swansea
15:00 GMT	Celina 71'; Routledge 72'	Report	Thorniley (yellow card) 12'; Baker (yellow card) 33'; Matias 63'	Stadium: Liberty Stadium; Attendance: 18,692 (836 away); Referee: David Webb

22 December 2018 23	Sheffield Wednesday	1–0	Preston North End	Owlerton, Sheffield
15:00 GMT	Hector 62'; Nuhiu (yellow card) 90+3'	Report	Moult (yellow card) 16'; Pearson (red card) 26'; Rudd (yellow card) 57'; Ledson (yellow card) 78'	Stadium: Hillsborough; Attendance: 22,366 (608 away); Referee: David Coote

26 December 2018 24	Middlesbrough	0–1	Sheffield Wednesday	Middlesbrough
15:00 GMT	Clayton (yellow card) 25'; Ayala (yellow card) 41'; McNair (yellow card) 81'	Report	Reach 20'; Palmer (yellow card) 83'; Fox (yellow card) 86'	Stadium: Riverside Stadium; Attendance: 30,341 (2,146 away); Referee: Peter Bankes

29 December 2018 25	West Bromwich Albion	1–1	Sheffield Wednesday	West Bromwich
15:00 GMT	Rodriguez (red card) 63'; Dawson (yellow card) 89'; Johnstone (yellow card) 90+3'; Jones 90+5' (o.g.)	Report	Nuhiu 5'; Matias (yellow card) 71'; Bannan (yellow card) 82'	Stadium: The Hawthorns; Attendance: 26,548 (2,600 away); Referee: Andy Davies

===== January =====
1 January 2019 26	Sheffield Wednesday	1–1	Birmingham City	Owlerton, Sheffield
15:00 GMT	Fletcher 18'; Fox (yellow card) 87'	Report	Adams 48'; Morrison (yellow card) 60'; Jota (yellow card) 71'; Gardner (yellow card) 83'	Stadium: Hillsborough; Attendance: 29,462 (1,554 away); Referee: Andy Woolmer

12 January 2019 27	Hull City	3–0	Sheffield Wednesday	Hull
15:00 GMT	Bowen 45+1', 52' (pen.); Campbell 76'	Report	Westwood (yellow card) 52'; Hutchinson (yellow card) 75'	Stadium: KCOM Stadium; Attendance: 14,102 (2,387 away); Referee: Geoff Eltringham

19 January 2019 28	Sheffield Wednesday	1–0	Wigan Athletic	Owlerton, Sheffield
15:00 GMT	Fletcher 62'	Report	Evans (yellow card) 45'; Kipré (yellow card) 73'	Stadium: Hillsborough; Attendance: 22,323 (513 away); Referee: Peter Bankes

===== February =====
2 February 2019 29	Ipswich Town	0–1	Sheffield Wednesday	Ipswich
15:00 GMT	Downes (yellow card) 64'	Report	Hutchinson (yellow card) 54'; Bannan (yellow card) 61'; João 90'	Stadium: Portman Road; Attendance: 16,888 (1,713 away); Referee: Oliver Langford

9 February 2019 30	Sheffield Wednesday	0–0	Reading	Owlerton, Sheffield
15:00 GMT		Report		Stadium: Hillsborough; Attendance: 23,412 (483 away); Referee: John Brooks

12 February 2019 31	Millwall	0–0	Sheffield Wednesday	Bermondsey, London
19:45 GMT	Cooper (yellow card) 83'	Report	Bannan (yellow card) 59'; Fletcher (yellow card) 66'	Stadium: The Den; Attendance: 11,828 (1,177 away); Referee: Tim Robinson

16 February 2019 32	Rotherham United	2–2	Sheffield Wednesday	Rotherham
13:00 GMT	Mattock (yellow card) 27'; Taylor 37'; Ajayi (yellow card) 39'; Jones (yellow card) 54'; Ihiekwe (yellow card) 61'; Towell 74'	Report	Forestieri 35' (yellow card) 90+4' (yellow-red card) 90+11'; Boyd (yellow card) 67'; Iorfa 90+10'	Stadium: New York Stadium; Attendance: 11,736 (2,625 away); Referee: Darren England

23 February 2019 33	Sheffield Wednesday	3–1	Swansea City	Owlerton, Sheffield
15:00 GMT	Reach 11', 32'; Fletcher 42'; Matias (yellow card) 66'	Report	McBurnie 69'	Stadium: Hillsborough; Attendance: 22,935 (838 away); Referee: Geoff Eltringham

26 February 2019 34	Sheffield Wednesday	2–0	Brentford	Owlerton, Sheffield
19:45 GMT	Hutchinson (yellow card) 15'; Fletcher 41', 48'	Report		Stadium: Hillsborough; Attendance: 23,094 (403 away); Referee: Scott Duncan

===== March =====
4 March 2019 35	Sheffield Wednesday	0–0	Sheffield United	Owlerton, Sheffield
19:45 GMT		Report		Stadium: Hillsborough; Attendance: 31,630 (3,951 away); Referee: Peter Bankes

9 March 2019 36	Derby County	1–1	Sheffield Wednesday	Derby
15:00 GMT	Johnson 10'; Bogle (yellow card) 43'; Holmes (yellow card) 45+1'	Report	Reach (yellow card) 27'; Iorfa 57'; Palmer (yellow card) 90+1'; Winnall (yellow card) 90+4'	Stadium: Pride Park Stadium; Attendance: 28,574 (3,138 away); Referee: Keith Stroud

12 March 2019 37	Bolton Wanderers	0–2	Sheffield Wednesday	Bolton
20:00 GMT		Report	Fletcher 44'; Aarons 59'	Stadium: University of Bolton Stadium; Attendance: 13,624 (1,918 away); Referee: Stephen Martin

16 March 2019 38	Sheffield Wednesday	4–2	Blackburn Rovers	Owlerton
15:00 GMT	Fletcher 10' (yellow card) 40'; Winnall (yellow card) 52'; Nuhiu 60'; Aarons (yellow card) 74'; Iorfa 79'; Lees (yellow card) 81'; Matias 86'	Report	Conway 72'; Bennett 88'	Stadium: Hillsborough Stadium; Attendance: 24,608 (899 away); Referee: James Linington

30 March 2019 39	Stoke City	0–0	Sheffield Wednesday	Stoke-on-Trent
15:00 GMT	Ince (yellow card) 84'	Report	Hutchinson (yellow card) 43'; Lees (yellow card) 45'; Nuhiu (yellow card) 80'	Stadium: Bet365 Stadium; Attendance: 26,398 (2,890 away); Referee: Andrew Madley

===== April =====
6 April 2019 40	Sheffield Wednesday	1–3	Aston Villa	Owlerton
15:00 BST	Hooper 7'; Fletcher (yellow card) 37' (penalty missed) 57'	Report	McGinn 22'; Whelan (yellow card) 38'; Mings (yellow card) 57'; Adomah 90+2' (yellow card) 90+4'; Abraham 90+4'	Stadium: Hillsborough Stadium; Attendance: 29,458 (4,440 away); Referee: Oliver Langford

9 April 2019 41	Sheffield Wednesday	3–0	Nottingham Forest	Owlerton
19:45 BST	Hector (yellow card) 18'; Matias 47', 67' (yellow card) 57'; Boyd 58'	Report	Byram (yellow card) 44'; Benalouane (yellow card) 64'	Stadium: Hillsborough Stadium; Attendance: 23,931 (1,964 away); Referee: Lee Mason

13 April 2019 42	Leeds United	1–0	Sheffield Wednesday	Leeds
17:30 BST	Harrison (yellow card) 16' (goal) 65'; Phillips (yellow card) 45+1'	Report	Lees (yellow card) 6'; Hutchinson (yellow card) 47'	Stadium: Elland Road; Attendance: 36,461 (2,527 away); Referee: Tim Robinson

19 April 2019 43	Norwich City	2–2	Sheffield Wednesday	Norwich
19:45 BST	Stiepermann 19'; Krul (yellow card) 54'; Vrančić 90+7'	Report	Dawson (yellow card) 9'; Forestieri 33'; Fletcher 53'; Boyd (yellow card) 81'	Stadium: Carrow Road; Attendance: 26,744 (1,400 away); Referee: Geoff Eltringham

22 April 2019 44	Sheffield Wednesday	2–0	Bristol City	Owlerton
15:00 BST	Bannan 17'; João 39' (yellow card) 69'	Report	Diédhiou (yellow card) 25'; Weimann (yellow card) 78'	Stadium: Hillsborough Stadium; Attendance: 23,998 (871 away); Referee: Robert Jones

27 April 2019 45	Preston North End	3–3	Sheffield Wednesday	Preston
15:00 BST	Stockley 9'; Lees 36' (o.g.); Browne 62'; Fisher (yellow card) 64'	Report	Pelupessy (yellow card) 35'; Bannan 49' (yellow card) 54'; Forestieri 76'; Nuhiu 78'; Iorfa (red card) 80'	Stadium: Deepdale; Attendance: 15,873 (4,239 away); Referee: Jeremy Simpson

===== May =====
5 May 2019 46	Sheffield Wednesday	1–2	Queens Park Rangers	Owlerton
12:30 BST	Forestieri (penalty missed) 57'; Hector 84' (pen.) (yellow card) 90+4'; Matias (yellow card) 90+3'	Report	Scowen 28' (yellow card) 74'; Eze (penalty missed) 80'; Cameron (yellow card) 88'; Smith 90+3'	Stadium: Hillsborough Stadium; Attendance: 26,111 (725 away); Referee: Andy Davies

=== FA Cup ===
In the FA Cup, Sheffield Wednesday entered the competition in the third round and were drawn home to Luton Town. The fourth round draw was made live on BBC by Robbie Keane and Carl Ikeme from Wolverhampton on 7 January 2019.

5 January 2019 Third round	Sheffield Wednesday	0–0	Luton Town	Owlerton, Sheffield
12:30 GMT	Reach (yellow card) 66'	Report		Stadium: Hillsborough; Attendance: 16,974; Referee: Robert Jones

15 January 2019 Third round replay	Luton Town	0–1	Sheffield Wednesday	Luton
19:45 GMT	Collins (yellow card) 37'	Report	Nuhiu (yellow card) 10' (goal) 46'; Palmer (yellow card) 61'; Boyd (yellow card) 80'	Stadium: Kenilworth Road; Attendance: 9,259; Referee: Tim Robinson

27 January 2019 Fourth round	Chelsea	3–0	Sheffield Wednesday	Fulham, London
18:00 GMT	Willian 26' (pen.), 83'; Hudson-Odoi 64'	Report	Fox (yellow card) 38'	Stadium: Stamford Bridge; Referee: Andre Marriner

=== EFL Cup ===
On 15 June 2018, the draw for the first round was made in Vietnam. The second round draw was made from the Stadium of Light on 16 August.

16 August 2018 First round	Sunderland	0–2	Sheffield Wednesday	Sunderland
19:45 BST		Report	Matias 29'; Reach 79'	Stadium: Stadium of Light; Attendance: 13,890; Referee: Ben Toner

28 August 2018 Second round	Sheffield Wednesday	0–2	Wolverhampton Wanderers	Owlerton, Sheffield
19:45 BST	Baker (yellow card) 51'; Nielsen (yellow card) 62'	Report	Bonatini 53'; Costa 85'	Stadium: Hillsborough; Attendance: 13,597 (2,945 away); Referee: Robert Jones

== Squad statistics ==
=== Appearances ===
As of 5 May 2019

No.	Pos	Nat	Player	Total		Championship		FA Cup		League Cup	
No.	Pos	Nat	Player	Apps	Goals	Apps	Goals	Apps	Goals	Apps	Goals
1	GK	(Republic of Ireland) IRL	Keiren Westwood	21	0	20	0	1	0	0	0
2	DF	(Scotland) SCO	Liam Palmer	39	0	34+1	0	3	0	1	0
3	MF	(England) ENG	David Jones	2	0	0+1	0	0	0	1	0
4	DF	(Netherlands) NED	Joost van Aken	2	0	1	0	0	0	1	0
5	MF	(England) ENG	Kieran Lee	2	0	1+1	0	0	0	0	0
6	DF	(Wales) WAL	Morgan Fox	29	0	21+4	0	3	0	1	0
7	MF	(England) ENG	Josh Onomah	15	0	10+5	0	0	0	0	0
8	MF	(Netherlands) NED	Joey Pelupessy	35	0	26+7	0	1+1	0	0	0
9	FW	(Scotland) SCO	Steven Fletcher	45	11	32+8	11	3	0	2	0
10	MF	(Scotland) SCO	Barry Bannan	45	4	40+1	4	3	0	1	0
11	FW	(England) ENG	Sam Winnall	8	0	1+6	0	0+1	0	0	0
12	DF	(England) ENG	Jordan Thorniley	22	0	17+3	0	2	0	0	0
14	FW	(England) ENG	Gary Hooper	6	1	4+2	1	0	0	0	0
15	DF	(England) ENG	Tom Lees	46	2	42	2	3	0	1	0
17	FW	(Kosovo) KOS	Atdhe Nuhiu	38	5	13+21	4	1+2	1	0+1	0
18	FW	(Portugal) POR	Lucas João	32	10	18+13	10	0+1	0	0	0
19	FW	(Portugal) POR	Marco Matias	34	7	20+11	6	1+1	0	1	1
20	MF	(England) ENG	Adam Reach	46	9	42	8	3	0	1	1
21	MF	(Scotland) SCO	George Boyd	25	1	14+6	1	3	0	2	0
23	DF	(England) ENG	Sam Hutchinson	27	0	22+2	0	2	0	1	0
24	DF	(Wales) WAL	Ashley Baker	12	0	11	0	0	0	1	0
25	GK	(England) ENG	Cameron Dawson	28	0	26	0	2	0	0	0
27	DF	(England) ENG	Dominic Iorfa	12	3	9+3	3	0	0	0	0
28	GK	(England) ENG	Joe Wildsmith	2	0	0	0	0	0	2	0
29	DF	(England) ENG	Alex Hunt	1	0	0	0	0	0	1	0
31	MF	(England) ENG	Connor Kirby	3	0	0+1	0	0	0	0+2	0
34	DF	(Jamaica) JAM	Michael Hector	39	2	36+1	2	2	0	0	0
35	DF	(Denmark) DEN	Frederik Nielsen	2	0	0	0	0	0	2	0
36	DF	(Czech Republic) CZE	Daniel Pudil	11	0	9+2	0	0	0	0	0
37	MF	(Scotland) SCO	Fraser Preston	4	0	1+2	0	0	0	1	0
38	MF	(Morocco) MAR	Achraf Lazaar	4	0	3+1	0	0	0	0	0
39	MF	(England) ENG	Rolando Aarons	9	1	6+3	1	0	0	0	0
41	DF	(England) ENG	Jack Lee	2	0	0	0	0	0	1+1	0
42	DF	(England) ENG	Matt Penney	17	0	12+4	0	0	0	0+1	0
44	MF	(England) ENG	Jack Stobbs	1	0	0	0	0	0	0+1	0
45	FW	(Italy) ITA	Fernando Forestieri	27	6	15+10	6	0+1	0	1	0

=== Goalscorers ===
As of 5 May 2019

Includes all competitive matches.

Rank	Pos.	Nat.	No.	Player	Championship	FA Cup	League Cup	Total
1	FW	(Scotland)	9	Steven Fletcher	11	0	0	11
2	FW	(Portugal)	18	Lucas João	10	0	0	10
3	MF	(England)	20	Adam Reach	8	0	1	9
4	FW	(Portugal)	19	Marco Matias	6	0	1	7
5	FW	(Italy)	45	Fernando Forestieri	6	0	0	6
6	FW	(Kosovo)	17	Atdhe Nuhiu	4	1	0	5
7	MF	(Scotland)	10	Barry Bannan	4	0	0	4
8	DF	(England)	27	Dominic Iorfa	3	0	0	3
9	DF	(England)	15	Tom Lees	2	0	0	2
9	DF	(Jamaica)	34	Michael Hector	2	0	0	2
10	FW	(England)	14	Gary Hooper	1	0	0	1
10	MF	(Scotland)	21	George Boyd	1	0	0	1
10	FW	(England)	39	Rolando Aarons	1	0	0	1
Own Goals					1	0	0	1
Total					59	1	2	62

=== Disciplinary record ===
As of 5 May 2019

No.	Pos.	Name	Championship		FA Cup		League Cup		Total	
No.	Pos.	Name	Yellow card	Red card	Yellow card	Red card	Yellow card	Red card	Yellow card	Red card
17	FW	Atdhe Nuhiu	6	1	1	0	0	0	7	1
45	FW	Fernando Forestieri	3	1	0	0	0	0	3	1
27	DF	Dominic Iorfa	0	1	0	0	0	0	0	1
10	MF	Barry Bannan	14	0	0	0	0	0	14	0
24	DF	Ash Baker	6	0	0	0	1	0	7	0
23	MF	Sam Hutchinson	5	0	0	0	0	0	5	0
2	DF	Liam Palmer	4	0	1	0	0	0	5	0
15	DF	Tom Lees	4	0	0	0	0	0	4	0
19	MF	Marco Matias	4	0	0	0	0	0	4	0
34	DF	Michael Hector	4	0	0	0	0	0	4	0
6	DF	Morgan Fox	3	0	1	0	0	0	4	0
9	FW	Steven Fletcher	3	0	0	0	0	0	3	0
18	FW	Lucas João	3	0	0	0	0	0	3	0
42	DF	Matt Penney	3	0	0	0	0	0	3	0
20	MF	Adam Reach	2	0	1	0	0	0	3	0
21	MF	George Boyd	2	0	1	0	0	0	3	0
8	MF	Joey Pelupessy	2	0	0	0	0	0	2	0
11	FW	Sam Winnall	2	0	0	0	0	0	2	0
25	GK	Cameron Dawson	2	0	0	0	0	0	2	0
1	GK	Keiren Westwood	1	0	0	0	0	0	1	0
4	DF	Joost van Aken	1	0	0	0	0	0	1	0
12	DF	Jordan Thorniley	1	0	0	0	0	0	1	0
39	MF	Rolando Aarons	1	0	0	0	0	0	1	0
35	DF	Frederik Nielsen	0	0	0	0	1	0	1	0

=== Clean sheets ===
As of 5 May 2019

No.	Nat.	Player	Matches Played	Clean Sheet %	League	FA Cup	EFL Cup	TOTAL
1	(Republic of Ireland)	Keiren Westwood	21	52.38%	11	0	0	11
25	(England)	Cameron Dawson	28	17.86%	3	2	0	5
28	(England)	Joe Wildsmith	2	50%	0	0	1	1

== Awards ==
=== Player of the Month ===
Player of the Month awards for the 2018–19 season.

Month	First	%	Second	%	Third	%	Ref
August	(Scotland) Barry Bannan	69%	(England) Jordan Thorniley	14%	(England) Matt Penney	7%	
September	(England) Matt Penney	57%	(Scotland) Barry Bannan	20%	(England) Adam Reach	10%	
October	(Jamaica) Michael Hector	40%	(England) Adam Reach	32%	(Scotland) Barry Bannan	10%	
November	(England) Cameron Dawson	52%	(England) Jordan Thorniley	10%	(England) Adam Reach	10%	
December	(Jamaica) Michael Hector	33%	(Wales) Morgan Fox	24%	(Republic of Ireland) Kieren Westwood	17%	
January	(Scotland) Steven Fletcher	43%	(Republic of Ireland) Kieren Westwood	17%	(Wales) Morgan Fox	13%	
February	(Scotland) Steven Fletcher	51%	(Scotland) Liam Palmer	29%	(England) Sam Hutchinson	10%	
March	(Scotland) Steven Fletcher	31%	(Republic of Ireland) Keiren Westwood	21%	(England) Dominic Iorfa	16%	
April	(Scotland) Barry Bannan	50%	(Jamaica) Michael Hector	20%	(Italy) Fernando Forestieri	13%	

=== Player of the Year ===
Player of the Year award for the 2018–19 season.

First	%	Second	%	Third	%	Ref
(Jamaica) Michael Hector	42%	(Scotland) Steven Fletcher	16%	(Scotland) Barry Bannan	13%	

=== EFL Awards ===
No	Pos	Name	Competition	Award	Date	Ref
18	FW	Lucas Joao	Championship	Team of the Week	Matchday 5	
10	MF	Barry Bannan	Championship	Sky Bet Championship Goal of the Month	August	
20	MF	Adam Reach	Championship	Team of the Week	Matchday 10	
18	FW	Lucas Joao	Championship	Team of the Week	Matchday 12	
20	MF	Adam Reach	Championship	PFA Fans’ Championship Player of the Month	September	
15	DF	Tom Lees	Championship	Team of the Week	Matchday 20	
20	MF	Adam Reach	Championship	Sky Bet Championship Goal of the Month	October	
18	FW	Lucas Joao	Championship	Team of the Week	Matchday 21	
18	FW	Lucas Joao	Championship	Sky Bet Championship Goal of the Month	December	
