= Jack Lee (footballer, born 1998) =

English footballer

Personal information
- Full name: Jack Lee
- Date of birth: 9 December 1998 (age 27)
- Place of birth: Darlington, England
- Position: Defender

Youth career
- –2015: Sunderland
- 2015: Sheffield Wednesday

Senior career*
Years	Team	Apps	(Gls)
2015–2020	Sheffield Wednesday	0	(0)
- * Club domestic league appearances and goals as of 12:46, 23 June 2020 (UTC)

Jack Lee (born 19 December 1998) is an English professional footballer who last played as a defender for Championship club Sheffield Wednesday.

== Club career ==
=== Sheffield Wednesday ===
Lee joined the Owls' academy in January 2015 after impressing on a trial basis, before signing his first professional contract in December that year.

Lee started the 2018–19 season on the first team bench, and made his professional debut against Sunderland in the EFL Cup First Round on 16 August 2018 alongside Alex Hunt and Matt Penney.

== Career statistics ==
As of 28 August 2018.

Club	Season	League			FA Cup		League Cup		Other		Total	
Club	Season	Division	Apps	Goals	Apps	Goals	Apps	Goals	Apps	Goals	Apps	Goals
Sheffield Wednesday	2018–19	Championship	0	0	0	0	2	0	0	0	2	0
Total			0	0	0	0	2	0	0	0	2	0
