= Morgan Fox (footballer) =

Welsh footballer (born 1993)

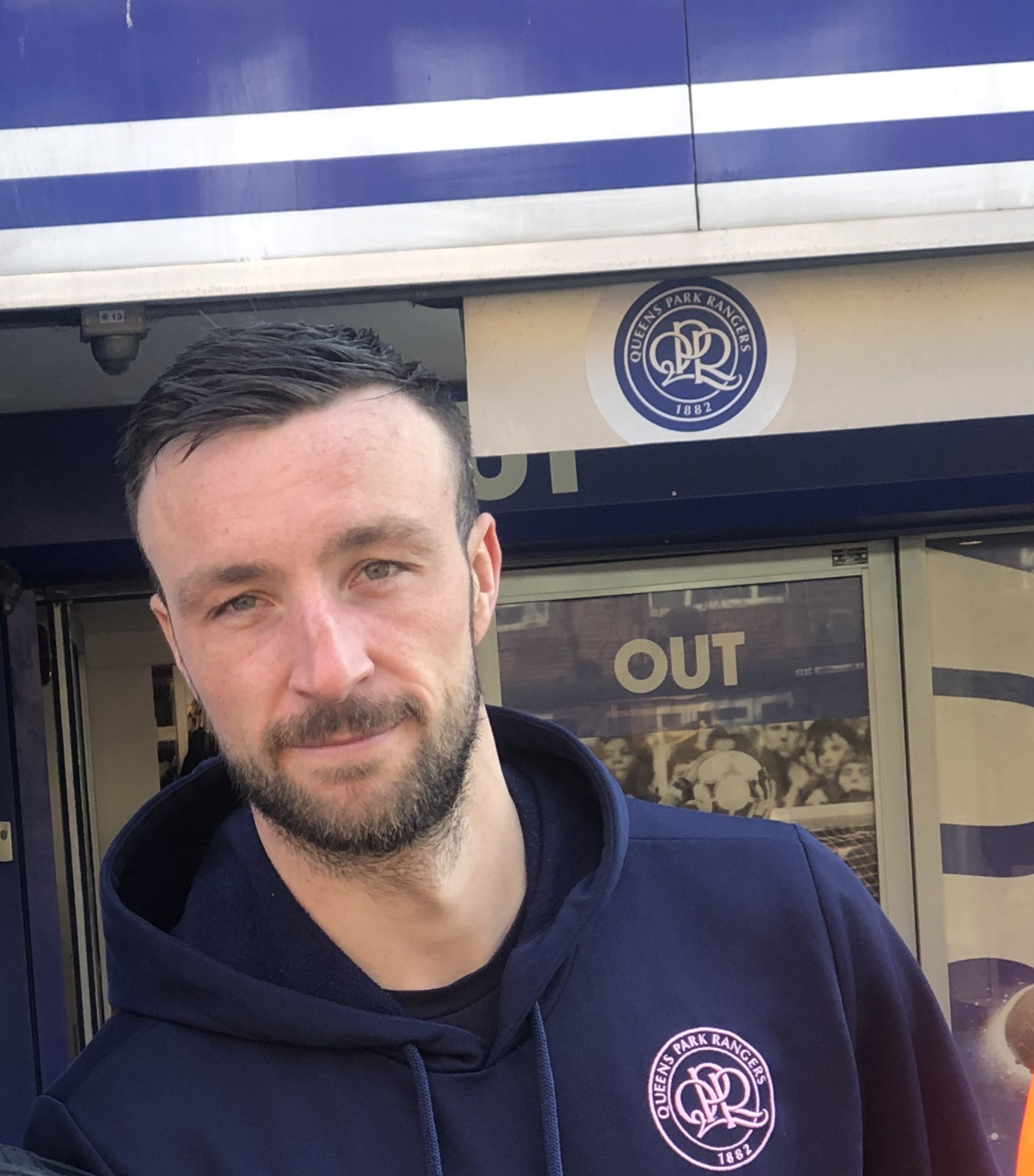
- Fox in 2025

Personal information
- Full name: Morgan Alexander Fox
- Date of birth: 21 September 1993 (age 33)
- Place of birth: Chelmsford, England
- Height: 6 ft 1 in (1.85 m)
- Position: Centre-back

Team information
- Current team: Wigan Athletic
- Number: 3

Youth career
- 2008–2010: Ipswich Town
- 2010–2012: Charlton Athletic

Senior career*
Years	Team	Apps	(Gls)
2013–2017	Charlton Athletic	103	(1)
2013–2014	→ Notts County (loan)	7	(1)
2017–2020	Sheffield Wednesday	90	(3)
2020–2023	Stoke City	70	(0)
2023–2025	Queens Park Rangers	46	(2)
2025–	Wigan Athletic	40	(0)

International career
2013–2014	Wales U21	7	(0)
- * Club domestic league appearances and goals as of 02:51, 2 October 2026 (UTC)

Morgan Alexander Fox (born 21 September 1993) is a professional footballer who plays as a centre-back for EFL League One club Wigan Athletic. Born in England, he represented Wales at youth level.

Fox began his career with Charlton Athletic and became a regular in the first team in the 2014–15 season after gaining experience on loan at Notts County. He made 116 appearances for the Addicks before joining Sheffield Wednesday in January 2017. Fox spent three and a half years at Hillsborough playing 103 times. Fox joined Stoke City in August 2020.

== Early life ==
Fox was born in Chelmsford and grew up in South Woodham Ferrers near Southend-on-Sea and attended Southend High School for Boys.

== Playing career ==
=== Charlton Athletic ===
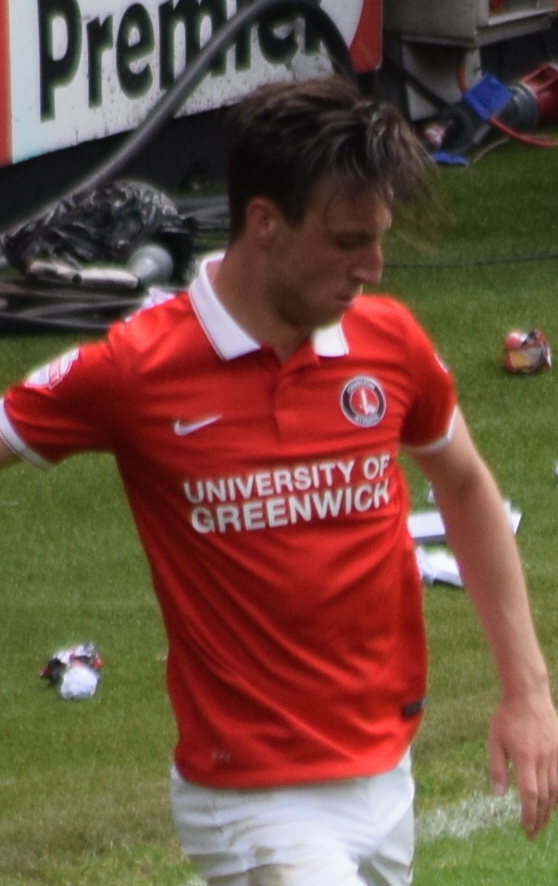
Morgan Fox with Charlton Athletic in 2016.

Fox earned his first professional contract at Charlton Athletic in March 2012 after leaving the Ipswich Town academy. Fox was a member of the Charlton Athletic U21 side which won the Professional Development League 2 title in 2012–13, under the management of Nathan Jones. Fox joined League One side Notts County on loan on 28 November 2013. He made his debut at Meadow Lane two days later in a 1–0 defeat to Brentford, coming on a substitute for Manny Smith on 68 minutes. He scored his first senior goal on 14 December in a 4–0 win over Colchester United at the Colchester Community Stadium. He played even times for the Magpies before returning to Charlton in January 2014.

Fox was an un-used substitute in Charlton's 1–0 home league win against Queens Park Rangers but made his debut in the next match against Sheffield Wednesday in a 2–1 win in the fifth round of the FA Cup at Hillsborough. On 25 April 2014, Fox signed a new three-year deal, securing his future to Charlton until 2017. He became a regular member of the first team in 2014–15, making 34 appearances as the team finished in 12th position.

He scored his first goal for Charlton in a 2–0 win against Queens Park Rangers on 8 August 2015. Fox signed a contract extension with Charlton in September 2015. He played 45 times in 2015–16 as Charlton struggled and were relegated to League One. Fox remained with Charlton for the first half of the 2016–17 campaign before moving to Sheffield Wednesday in January 2017.

=== Sheffield Wednesday ===
On 6 January 2017, Fox joined Sheffield Wednesday for a fee of £700,000. Fox made his full debut for Wednesday on 31 January 2017 in a 2–2 draw away at Bristol City. He score his first goal for the Owls on 4 March 2017 in a 5–1 win against Norwich City. Wednesday reached the Championship play-offs in 2016–17 but lost on penalties to Huddersfield Town. He played 32 times in 2017–18 as the team finished in a mid-table. Fox struggled for form in 2018–19 and came in for criticism from the Wednesday supporters. He improved under Garry Monk in 2019–20 with the Sheffield Star commenting: "Fox endured a tough 2018–19 season at Hillsborough, with fans turning against him as he struggled for form and confidence, but fast-forward a year and he's become one of the top performers at Wednesday and is one of the first names on Garry Monk's teamsheet".

On 24 June 2020, it was announced that he had declined a new contract and would be leaving the club on 30 June 2020.

=== Stoke City ===
On 7 August 2020 it was announced that Fox joined Stoke City, on a free transfer following his departure from Sheffield Wednesday. Fox made his Stoke debut on the opening day of the 2020–21 season in a 0–0 draw away at Millwall. He was a regular in Michael O'Neill's side until he picked up a hamstring injury in December 2020 which ruled him out until February 2021. On his return to the team Fox managed three more games before he aggravated his injury against Sheffield Wednesday which kept him out for the remainder of the season. Fox struggled with injures and form in 2021–22 and was restricted to 13 appearances. Fox was a regular in the team in 2022–23, playing 43 times as Stoke finished in 16th position. His contract was not renewed and he was released at the end of the season.

=== Queens Park Rangers ===
Fox joined Queens Park Rangers on 24 July 2023, signing a two-year deal at Loftus Road.

=== Wigan Athletic ===
On 2 August 2025, Fox joined League One club Wigan Athletic on a two-year deal.

== International career ==
Fox was capped seven times for Wales at under-21 level.

Fox was named in the Wales senior squad for the UEFA Euro 2016 qualifying matches against Cyprus and Israel played on 3 and 6 September 2015. In March 2023 he was called up for the Euro 2024 qualifying matches against Croatia and Latvia.

== Career statistics ==
As of 22 September 2026

Appearances and goals by club, season and competition
Club	Season	League			FA Cup		League Cup		Other		Total	
Club	Season	Division	Apps	Goals	Apps	Goals	Apps	Goals	Apps	Goals	Apps	Goals
Charlton Athletic	2013–14	Championship	6	0	1	0	0	0	—		7	0
Charlton Athletic	2014–15	Championship	31	0	1	0	2	0	—		34	0
Charlton Athletic	2015–16	Championship	42	1	1	0	2	0	—		45	1
Charlton Athletic	2016–17	League One	24	0	3	0	1	0	2 (Note: Appearances in EFL Trophy)	0	30	0
Charlton Athletic	Total		103	1	6	0	5	0	2	0	116	1
Notts County (loan)	2013–14	League One	7	1	0	0	0	0	—		7	1
Sheffield Wednesday	2016–17	Championship	10	1	0	0	0	0	0	0	10	1
Sheffield Wednesday	2017–18	Championship	28	0	4	0	0	0	—		32	0
Sheffield Wednesday	2018–19	Championship	25	0	3	0	1	0	—		29	0
Sheffield Wednesday	2019–20	Championship	27	2	3	1	2	0	—		32	3
Sheffield Wednesday	Total		90	3	10	1	3	0	0	0	103	4
Stoke City	2020–21	Championship	20	0	0	0	2	0	—		22	0
Stoke City	2021–22	Championship	10	0	2	0	1	0	—		13	0
Stoke City	2022–23	Championship	40	0	2	0	1	0	—		43	0
Stoke City	Total		70	0	4	0	4	0	0	0	78	0
Queens Park Rangers	2023–24	Championship	20	1	1	0	1	0	—		22	1
Queens Park Rangers	2024–25	Championship	26	1	0	0	0	0	—		26	1
Queens Park Rangers	Total		46	2	1	0	1	0	0	0	48	2
Wigan Athletic	2025–26	League One	35	0	4	0	1	0	1	0	41	0
Wigan Athletic	2026–27	League One	5	0	0	0	1	0	2	0	8	0
Wigan Athletic	Total		40	0	4	0	2	0	3	0	49	0
Career total			358	7	25	1	15	0	5	0	401	8
