= Ash Baker =

Welsh footballer

Personal information
- Full name: Ashley Thomas Baker
- Date of birth: 30 October 1996 (age 30)
- Place of birth: Bridgend, Wales
- Height: 5 ft 10 in (1.78 m)
- Position: Right back

Team information
- Current team: Penybont
- Number: 21

Youth career
- –2017: Cardiff City
- 2017–2018: Sheffield Wednesday

Senior career*
Years	Team	Apps	(Gls)
2018–2020	Sheffield Wednesday	12	(0)
2020–2021	Newport County	8	(0)
2021–2025	The New Saints	45	(10)
2025–	Penybont	31	(0)

International career^{‡}
	Wales U19	1	(0)
2018	Wales U21	3	(0)
- * Club domestic league appearances and goals as of 08:20, 8 November 2026 (UTC) ‡ National team caps and goals as of 18:08, 12 October 2018 (UTC)

Ashley Thomas Baker (born 30 October 1996) is a Welsh professional footballer who plays as a defender for Cymru Premier club Penybont.

== Club career ==
=== Sheffield Wednesday ===
Born in Bridgend, Baker began his career as a youth player with Cardiff City at under-14 level. He was released by the club in January 2017, signing his first professional contract for Sheffield Wednesday in the same month.

In May 2018, he made his first team debut for the club, starting at right-back as Wednesday beat Norwich City in the final Football League Championship match of the season.

=== Newport County ===
On 13 January 2020, Baker signed for League Two club Newport County on a one-and-a-half-year deal for an undisclosed fee. He made his debut for Newport on 18 January 2020, starting in a 2–0 league win against Swindon Town. He scored his first goal for Newport in the 2–1 FA Cup first-round win against Leyton Orient on 7 November 2020. On 4 June 2021 it was announced that he would leave Newport County at the end of the 2020-21 season, following the expiry of his contract.

=== The New Saints ===
In July 2021 he joined Cymru Premier club The New Saints.

He left the club at the end of the 2024–25 season.

=== Penybont ===
He then joined Penybont in summer 2025.

== International career ==
Having earned one cap for Wales at under-19 level, Baker made his debut for the under-21 side on 7 September 2018, in a 2–1 victory over Liechtenstein.

== Career statistics ==
As of 6 February 2021

Appearances and goals by club, season and competition
Club	Season	League			FA Cup		League Cup		Other		Total	
Club	Season	Division	Apps	Goals	Apps	Goals	Apps	Goals	Apps	Goals	Apps	Goals
Sheffield Wednesday
Sheffield Wednesday	2017–18	Championship	1	0	0	0	0	0	0	0	1	0
Sheffield Wednesday	2018–19	Championship	11	0	0	0	1	0	0	0	12	0
Sheffield Wednesday	2019–20	Championship	0	0	0	0	0	0	0	0	0	0
Sheffield Wednesday	Total		12	0	0	0	1	0	0	0	13	0
Newport County	2019–20	League Two	4	0	0	0	0	0	0	0	4	0
Newport County	2020–21	League Two	4	0	1	0	0	0	3	0	8	0
Newport County	Total		8	0	1	0	0	0	3	0	12	0
Career total			20	0	1	0	1	0	3	0	25	0

== Honours ==
=== The New Saints ===
- Cymru Premier: 2021–22
