= Dominic Iorfa (footballer, born 1995) =

English footballer

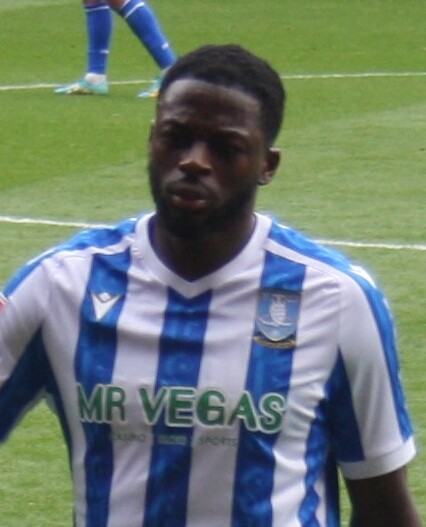
- Iorfa playing for Sheffield Wednesday in 2025.

Personal information
- Full name: Dominic Iorfa
- Date of birth: 24 June 1995 (age 31)
- Place of birth: Rochford, England
- Height: 6 ft 4 in (1.93 m)
- Position: Defender

Team information
- Current team: Rotherham United
- Number: 27

Youth career
- Southend United
- –2013: Wolverhampton Wanderers

Senior career*
Years	Team	Apps	(Gls)
2013–2019	Wolverhampton Wanderers	84	(0)
2014	→ Shrewsbury Town (loan)	7	(0)
2017–2018	→ Ipswich Town (loan)	23	(1)
2019–2026	Sheffield Wednesday	198	(7)
2026–	Rotherham United	9	(0)

International career
2013	England U18	1	(0)
2014–2015	England U20	4	(0)
2015–2017	England U21	13	(0)
- * Club domestic league appearances and goals as of 17:16, 21 November 2026 (UTC)

Dominic Iorfa (born 24 June 1995) is an English professional footballer who plays as a defender for EFL League Two club Rotherham United. He also represented England at under-21 level.

== Club career ==
=== Wolverhampton Wanderers ===
Iorfa was part of the youth system at his local club Southend United before joining the academy of Wolverhampton Wanderers at the age of 15.

He moved on a one-month loan to League One Shrewsbury Town on 18 March 2014, and made his senior debut the same day as a substitute in a 0–1 defeat at Colchester. Iorfa's first senior start came eleven days later in a 1–0 loss to Walsall at the Bescot Stadium, receiving his first yellow card also. Overall Iorfa made seven appearances for the Shrews in a campaign which ultimately resulted in relegation.

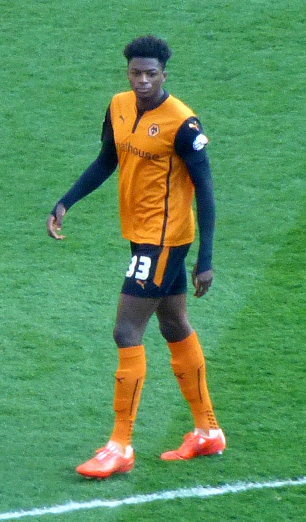
Iorfa in 2015

Following his return to Wolves, Iorfa made his first appearance for the club as a surprise starter in a 2–1 loss to Bournemouth at Molineux on 6 December 2014. He swiftly became the club's first choice right-back, starting in twenty-one of Wolves' twenty-five remaining fixtures following his debut. Having made his debut at the start of a 4-game unbeaten run, Iorfa became a fan favourite and a regular to the first team. In January 2015, Iorfa won the football league's Young Player Of The Month award, and that same day went on to assist a goal in a 3–0 win for Wolves against Fulham.

Iorfa received his first ever red card in the first game of the 2016–17 season, a straight red against Rotherham at the New York Stadium on 6 August 2016. Wolves were 2–0 down at the time but fought back despite being down to 10 men to draw 2–2 with goals from George Saville and Jón Daði Böðvarsson in Walter Zenga's first game as head coach.

On 14 July 2017 Iorfa was sent on a season-long loan to fellow Championship side Ipswich Town. He made 25 total appearances and scored in a 4–2 home win over Nottingham Forest on 2 December.

=== Sheffield Wednesday ===
On 31 January 2019 Iorfa moved to Sheffield Wednesday for an undisclosed fee. He would make his debut against Rotherham United on 16 February 2019, where he would score his first goal and second career goal, with the last kick of the game to draw 2-2.

The following season, he was voted as Sheffield Wednesday Player of the Year for the 2019–20 season.

In December 2020, he ruptured his Achilles tendon in a match against Barnsley, meaning he would miss the remainder of the 20-21 season. He would return in time for the start of the 21-22 season after Wednesday had suffered relegation without him, and would make his return against Huddersfield Town in the first round of the EFL Cup. Following his return from injury, Iorfa would sign a new two-year deal keeping him at the club until the summer of 2023. Following promotion back to the EFL Championship on option was taken in Iorfa's contact for him to stay at the club.

Following the end of the 2023–24 season, the club had offered Iorfa a new contract. It was confirmed his new contract was signed on 3 July 2024.

In January 2025, Iorfa had an extended spell on the sidelines, picking up a muscle injury ruling him out for 8 weeks.

At the end of the 2025–26 season, it was confirmed that after seven-years, 222 appearances and 7 goals, Iorfa would be leaving the club at the end of his contract.

=== Rotherham United ===
On 15 September 2026, Iorfa signed a short-term contract until January 2027 with League Two club Rotherham United.

== International career ==
Iorfa has been capped by England at under 18, under 20 and under 21 levels. According to his father, Iorfa will consider playing for Nigeria only after his 23rd birthday.

== Personal life ==
His father — also named Dominic Iorfa — played as a striker and represented Nigeria at senior, and under-23 levels.

== Career statistics ==
As of 21 November 2026

Appearances and goals by club, season and competition
Club	Season	League			FA Cup		League Cup		Other		Total	
Club	Season	Division	Apps	Goals	Apps	Goals	Apps	Goals	Apps	Goals	Apps	Goals
Wolves	2014–15	Championship	20	0	2	0	0	0	0	0	22	0
Wolves	2015–16	Championship	42	0	1	0	3	0	0	0	46	0
Wolves	2016–17	Championship	22	0	1	0	2	0	0	0	25	0
Wolves	Total		84	0	4	0	5	0	0	0	93	0
Shrewsbury Town (loan)	2013–14	League One	7	0	0	0	0	0	0	0	7	0
Ipswich Town (loan)	2017–18	Championship	23	1	1	0	1	0	0	0	25	1
Sheffield Wednesday	2018–19	Championship	12	3	0	0	0	0	0	0	12	3
Sheffield Wednesday	2019–20	Championship	41	2	2	0	2	0	0	0	45	2
Sheffield Wednesday	2020–21	Championship	10	0	0	0	2	0	0	0	12	0
Sheffield Wednesday	2021–22	League One	19	0	0	0	1	0	1 (Note: Appearance(s) in Football League Trophy)	0	21	0
Sheffield Wednesday	2022–23	League One	32	0	5	0	3	0	5 (Note: Two appearances in the EFL Trophy, three appearance in League One play-offs)	0	45	0
Sheffield Wednesday	2023–24	Championship	28	0	0	0	2	0	0	0	30	0
Sheffield Wednesday	2024–25	Championship	22	1	0	0	1	0	0	0	23	1
Sheffield Wednesday	2025–26	Championship	34	1	0	0	0	0	0	0	34	1
Sheffield Wednesday	Total		198	7	7	0	11	0	6	0	222	7
Rotherham United	2026–27	League Two	9	0	0	0	0	0	1	0	10	0
Career total			317	8	12	0	17	0	7	0	353	8

== Honours ==
Sheffield Wednesday

- EFL League One play-offs: 2023

England U21

- Toulon Tournament: 2016

Individual

- Football League Young Player of the Month: January 2015
- Sheffield Wednesday Player of the Year: 2019–20
