= Pat Hector =

English cricketer (born 1958)

Personal information
- Full name: Patrick Anthony Hector
- Born: 29 July 1958 (age 68); Islington, London, England
- Batting: Right-handed
- Bowling: Right-arm medium

Domestic team information
- Years: Team
- 1977: Essex

Career statistics
Competition	First-class
Matches	3
Runs scored	75
Batting average	18.75
100s/50s	–/–
Top score	40
Balls bowled	336
Wickets	7
Bowling average	33.66
5 wickets in innings	–
10 wickets in match	–
Best bowling	3/56
Catches/stumpings	–/–
- Source: Cricinfo, 28 September 2014

Patrick Anthony Hector (born 29 July 1958) is an English former first-class cricketer. He played in three matches for Essex in the 1977 English cricket season. He also appeared for the England Under-19 cricket team in two One-Day International matches against Australia in England in the same cricket season.

Hector was a right-handed lower-order batsman, though in his first first-class match against Cambridge University he batted in the Essex middle order and scored 40 runs, his career-best score. He was also a right-arm fast-medium pace bowler who opened the bowling. His best bowling performance came in his last match, with three for 56 against Leicestershire.

Wisden wrote in 1978 that Hector was "highly thought of by the senior players" at Essex, but he did not appear for the county again, although he played second eleven cricket for a further season.

== Personal life ==
Pat was born in England and is of Jamaican descent. His son Michael is a professional footballer who is currently a Free Agent, and is a former international with the Jamaica national football team.
