= Kadeem Harris =

English footballer (born 1993)

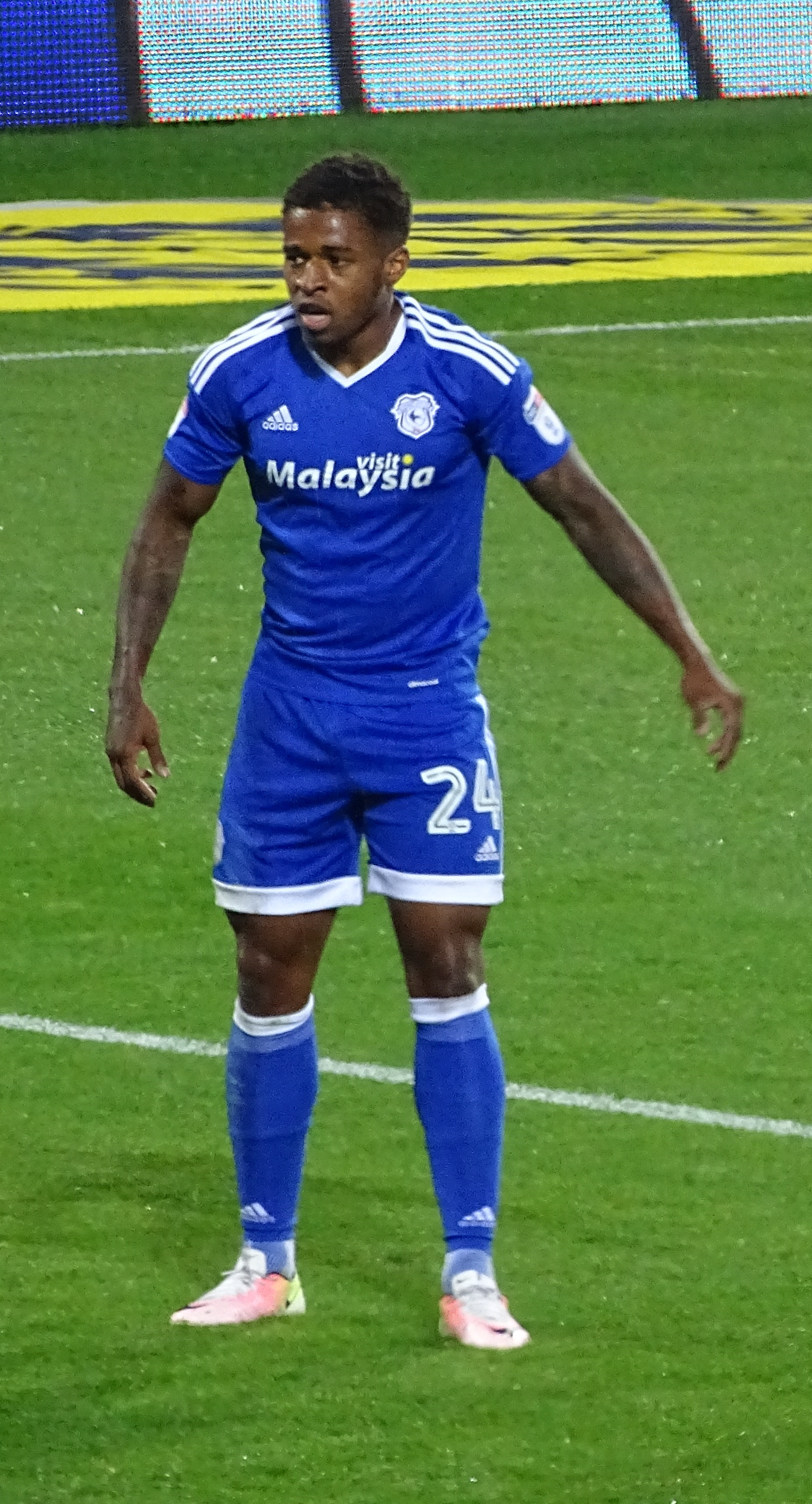
- Harris playing for Cardiff City in 2016

Personal information
- Full name: Kadeem Raymond Mathurin-Harris
- Date of birth: 8 June 1993 (age 33)
- Place of birth: Westminster, England
- Height: 5 ft 9 in (1.75 m)
- Position: Midfielder

Team information
- Current team: Gillingham
- Number: 7

Youth career
- –2009: Wycombe Wanderers

Senior career*
Years	Team	Apps	(Gls)
2009–2012	Wycombe Wanderers	19	(0)
2012–2019	Cardiff City	70	(6)
2013	→ Brentford (loan)	10	(1)
2015	→ Barnsley (loan)	11	(0)
2019–2021	Sheffield Wednesday	81	(3)
2021–2022	Metalist Kharkiv	11	(1)
2022	→ Tuzlaspor (loan)	6	(3)
2022–2023	Samsunspor	24	(2)
2023–2024	Bandırmaspor	11	(0)
2024	Şanlıurfaspor	11	(1)
2024–2025	Carlisle United	30	(3)
2025–2026	Salford City	22	(4)
2026–	Gillingham	0	(0)
- * Club domestic league appearances and goals as of 14:50, 2 July 2026 (UTC)

Kadeem Raymond Mathurin-Harris (born 8 June 1993), known as Kadeem Harris, is an English professional footballer who plays as a midfielder for EFL League Two club Gillingham. A versatile player, Harris has been deployed as a central midfielder, attacking midfielder, winger or forward.

== Career ==
=== Early career ===
Born in Westminster, London, Harris once held the record for the youngest player ever to appear for Wycombe in the Football League, breaking Ikechi Anya's record set in 2004 by coming on as a substitute for the final 12 minutes against Yeovil Town in December 2009, aged 16 years and 201 days.

=== Wycombe Wanderers ===
Harris made his home debut for the club against Gillingham on the last day of the 2009–10 season. He found his chances for first team football limited in the 2010–11 season, only featuring for 25 minutes in the Football League Trophy tie with Bristol Rovers. He scored his first goal for the first team in the quarter-final of the Berks & Bucks Senior Cup against Burnham. Harris was awarded the League Two Apprentice of the Year at the Football League Awards in April 2011 and later that month was one of four Wycombe scholars to be awarded professional contracts by the club. Harris was subject to a £50,000 bid by Premier League side Fulham in July 2011 but the offer was rejected by Wycombe. Harris made a late cameo appearance on the first day of the 2011–12 season against Scunthorpe United, replacing Joel Grant. He then made his first start in a competitive match for Wycombe in the League Cup during Wycombe's clash with Colchester United on 9 August 2011. Wycombe won on penalties but the game also saw Harris' record as youngest player broken by Jordon Ibe. On 24 September 2011, Harris made his first league start for club in a 1–0 win over Sheffield United. He was a first team regular and 22 appearances during the first half of the 2011–12 season, before departing the club in January 2012. Harris made 26 appearances in all competitions for Wycombe and scored no goals.

=== Cardiff City ===
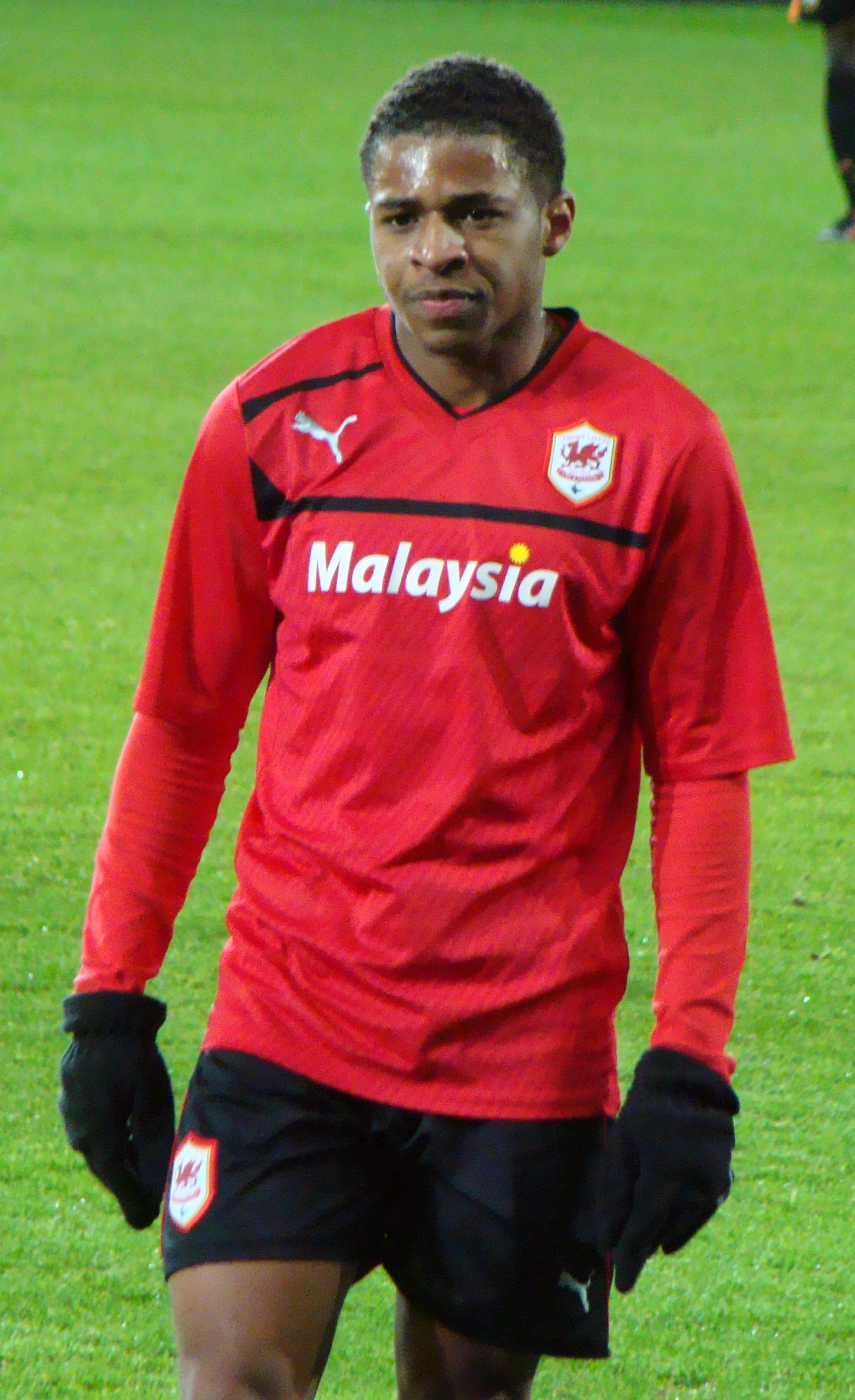
Harris playing for the Cardiff City Development Squad in 2013.

On 30 January 2012, Harris signed for Championship side Cardiff City on a three-and-a-half-year contract for an undisclosed fee. His maiden call up to the first team came in a 3–1 league defeat to Blackpool on 4 February 2012, when he was an unused substitute. He was an unused substitute on a further three occasions during the 2011–12 season and was not called into the squad for the play-offs or the 2012 League Cup final. Harris was only called into the first team squad on one occasion during the 2012–13 Championship-winning season, when he made his debut in a 2–1 FA Cup third round defeat against Macclesfield Town on 5 January 2013. Harris started the match and was substituted for Tommy O'Sullivan after 64 minutes. Harris received his first call into the first team squad of the 2013–14 season on 28 August 2013, when he was an unused substitute for a 2–0 League Cup first round win over Accrington Stanley. He was again an unused substitute in the following round, which saw Cardiff lose 3–2 to fellow Premier League side West Ham United.

==== Loans spells ====
After putting in an "outstanding" performance for Cardiff in a Professional Development League game versus Brentford, on 18 October 2013 Harris joined the League One side on a loan running until 5 January 2014. The following day, he was included in the squad to face Colchester United and after replacing Will Grigg on 65 minutes, he scored the first senior goal of his career in a 3–1 win. Harris scored his second Brentford goal in an FA Cup first round tie against local neighbours Staines Town on 9 November, scoring the second in a 5–0 victory. Harris was stretchered off with a hamstring problem in a 3–0 victory over Preston North End on 21 December, casting doubt on his loan being extended. On 26 December it was reported that Harris would be out for a month, with manager Mark Warburton keen on extending the loan. Harris tweeted on 29 December that he would be returning to Cardiff, leaving plans to extend his loan up in the air. Harris made 11 appearances for Brentford and scored two goals. It was reported in mid-March 2014 that Harris was close to a return to the Bees to cover for the injured Sam Saunders, despite being sidelined with an ankle injury himself.

The following season, Harris started to become a regular under new manager, Russell Slade, who was appointed in October. He played his first league game for Cardiff in a 5–3 loss to Bournemouth, on 20 December. Harris scored his first goal for The Bluebirds in an FA Cup win against Colchester United, following this with his first league goal against Norwich City.

On 22 August 2015, Harris joined League One side Barnsley on loan until 21 November 2015. He made his debut in a goalless draw against Bradford City and went onto make 14 appearances for Barnsley before returning to Cardiff.

=== Return to first team ===
In August 2016, Harris received a lot of praise from Cardiff fans and manager, Paul Trollope, after his performances against Blackburn Rovers and Fulham in an unusual right wing back position. Harris continued to impress under new manager, Neil Warnock and eventually found his first goal on 14 January, scoring in the Severnside derby against Bristol City in a 3–2 win. He followed this by scoring two to help Cardiff come back from 2 goals down to beat Derby County, 4–3, before scoring his third in two games against Rotherham United.

His performance throughout the season saw Harris gifted the number 11 shirt for the 2017–18 season. However, an ankle injury suffered during pre-season ruled him out for 3 months. Following several games for the under-23 side, Harris eventually made his return to the first team in a 0–0 draw at Sheffield Wednesday, replacing Junior Hoilett.

Harris scored his first goal since returning from injury in the 2018–19 season, in a 4–2 win over Fulham in the Premier League, Cardiff's first win of the campaign.

=== Sheffield Wednesday ===
On 13 July 2019, it was announced that Harris had signed for Sheffield Wednesday on a free transfer. He would score on his debut away to Reading on the opening day of the 2019–20 season. He would finish his first season at the club scoring 3 goals in 47 appearances across all competitions.

In his second season, he would be shown a straight red-card at home to Bournemouth on 3 November 2020.

On 20 May 2021 it was announced that he would leave Sheffield Wednesday at the end of the season, following the expiry of his contract.

=== Metalist Kharkiv ===
On 20 September 2021, it was announced that Harris had signed by the Ukrainian First League (the second tier of Ukrainian football pyramid) side Metalist Kharkiv on a free transfer. He made his debut on 21 September 2021 in the 1/16 stage of the Ukrainian Cup with a 2–1 win against Desna Chernihiv, and scored on the 73rd minute to equalise the score.

=== Spells in Turkey ===
In the course of the escalating Russo-Ukrainian war, Harris was loaned to Turkish side Tuzlaspor in April 2022.

On 24 July 2022, Harris joined TFF First League side Samsunspor on a two-year deal.

On 12 September 2023, Harris joined TFF First League club Bandırmaspor on an initial two-year deal with the option for a further twelve months. On 20 January 2024, he joined First League rivals Şanlıurfaspor on a one-and-a-half-year deal. The following day, he made his debut off the bench and scored in a 4–0 victory over Adanaspor.

=== Carlisle United ===
On 9 November 2024, Harris returned to England, joining League Two side Carlisle United on a short-term contract until January 2025. Harris made his debut on 9 November against Salford City coming on as a substitution

=== Salford City ===
Harris returned to League Two following Carlisle United's relegation, joining Salford City on a one-year deal. On 1 June 2026, it was announced by the club that Harris would leave the club on the expiry of his contract.

=== Gillingham ===
On 25 June 2026, Harris signed for Gillingham.

== Career statistics ==
As of 7 October 2023

Appearances and goals by club, season and competition
Club	Season	League			National cup		League cup		Other		Total	
Club	Season	Division	Apps	Goals	Apps	Goals	Apps	Goals	Apps	Goals	Apps	Goals
Wycombe Wanderers	2009–10	League One	2	0	0	0	0	0	0	0	2	0
Wycombe Wanderers	2010–11	League Two	0	0	1	0	0	0	1 (Note: Appearance(s) in Football League Trophy)	0	2	0
Wycombe Wanderers	2011–12	League One	17	0	1	0	2	0	2	0	22	0
Wycombe Wanderers	Total		19	0	2	0	2	0	3	0	26	0
Cardiff City	2011–12	Championship	0	0	0	0	0	0	0	0	0	0
Cardiff City	2012–13	Championship	0	0	1	0	0	0	—		1	0
Cardiff City	2013–14	Premier League	0	0	—		0	0	—		0	0
Cardiff City	2014–15	Championship	14	1	2	1	2	0	—		18	2
Cardiff City	2015–16	Championship	3	0	0	0	1	0	—		4	0
Cardiff City	2016–17	Championship	37	4	1	0	0	0	—		38	4
Cardiff City	2017–18	Championship	3	0	0	0	0	0	—		3	0
Cardiff City	2018–19	Premier League	13	1	1	0	1	0	—		15	1
Cardiff City	Total		70	6	5	1	4	0	0	0	79	7
Brentford (loan)	2013–14	League One	4	1	1	1	—		—		5	2
Barnsley (loan)	2015–16	League One	11	0	—		—		2	0	13	0
Sheffield Wednesday	2019–20	Championship	43	3	2	0	2	0	—		47	3
Sheffield Wednesday	2020–21	Championship	38	0	2	0	1	0	—		41	0
Sheffield Wednesday	Total		81	3	4	0	3	0	0	0	88	3
Metalist Kharkiv	2021–22	Ukrainian First League	11	1	2	1	—		—		13	2
Tuzlaspor (loan)	2021–22	TFF First League	6	3	0	0	—		—		6	3
Samsunspor	2022–23	TFF First League	24	2	1	0	—		—		25	2
Bandırmaspor	2023–24	TFF First League	2	0	0	0	—		—		2	0
Career total			228	16	15	3	9	0	5	0	257	19

== Honours ==
Samsunspor

- TFF First League: 2022–23

Individual

- Football League Two Apprentice of the Year: 2010–11
