= Michael Hector =

Jamaican footballer (born 1992)

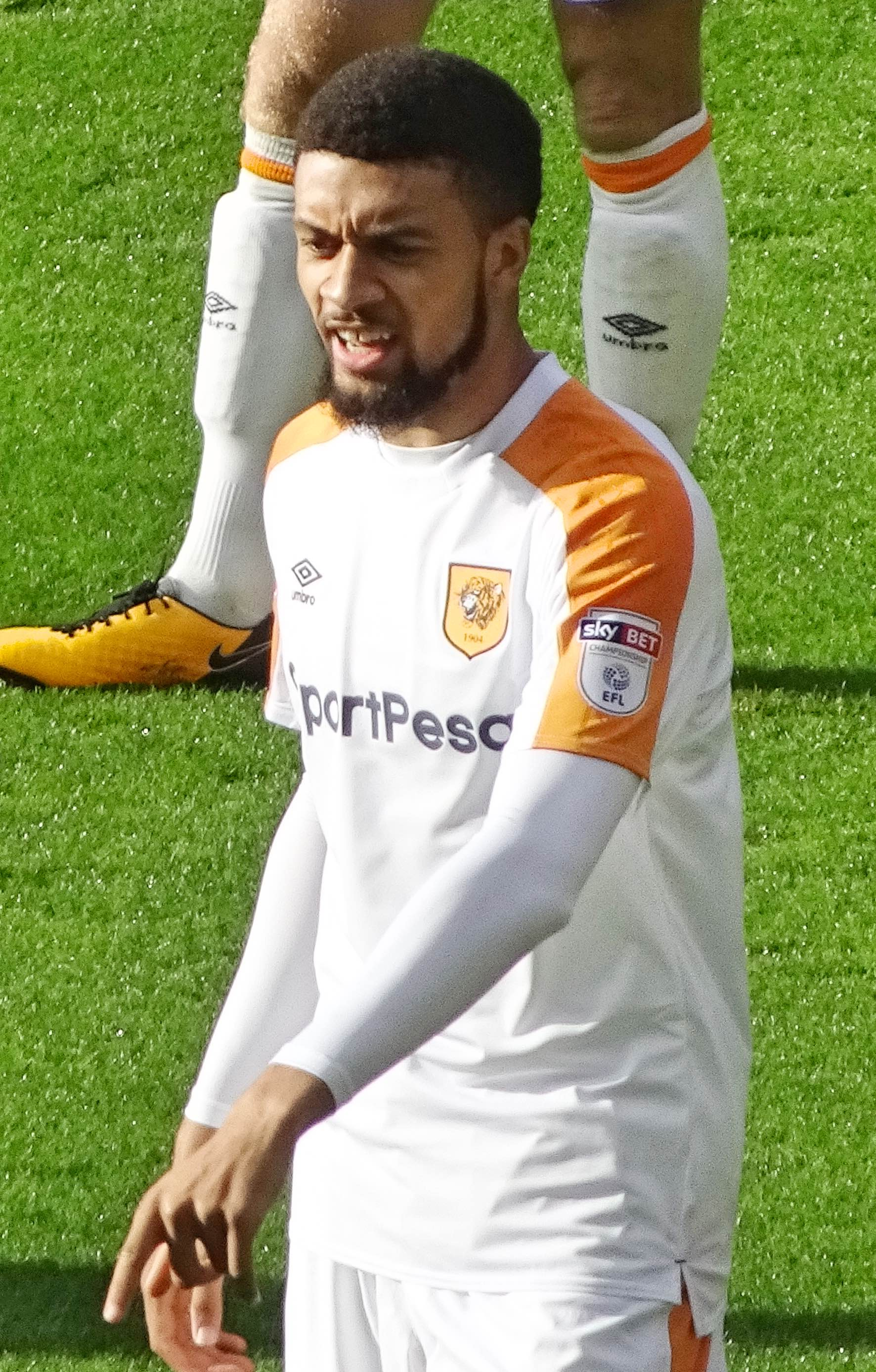
- Hector playing for Hull City in 2017

Personal information
- Full name: Michael Anthony James Hector
- Date of birth: 19 July 1992 (age 34)
- Place of birth: East Ham, London, England
- Height: 6 ft 4 in (1.93 m)
- Position: Centre-back

Youth career
- Millwall
- –2009: Thurrock
- 2009–2010: Reading

Senior career*
Years	Team	Apps	(Gls)
2009–2015	Reading	54	(3)
2009	→ Bracknell Town (loan)	3	(0)
2009	→ Didcot Town (loan)	3	(0)
2010	→ Havant & Waterlooville (loan)	1	(0)
2010	→ Oxford City (loan)	6	(0)
2010–2011	→ Horsham (loan)	11	(1)
2011	→ Dundalk (loan)	11	(2)
2011–2012	→ Barnet (loan)	27	(2)
2012	→ Shrewsbury Town (loan)	8	(0)
2012–2013	→ Aldershot Town (loan)	8	(1)
2013	→ Cheltenham Town (loan)	20	(1)
2013–2014	→ Aberdeen (loan)	20	(1)
2015–2019	Chelsea	0	(0)
2015–2016	→ Reading (loan)	26	(1)
2016–2017	→ Eintracht Frankfurt (loan)	22	(1)
2017–2018	→ Hull City (loan)	36	(1)
2018–2019	→ Sheffield Wednesday (loan)	37	(2)
2019–2022	Fulham	28	(0)
2023–2024	Charlton Athletic	51	(0)
2025	Dagenham & Redbridge	2	(0)

International career^{‡}
2015–	Jamaica	45	(0)
Medal record
Men's football
Representing Jamaica
CONCACAF Gold Cup
Runner-up	2015 United States–Canada	Team
CONCACAF Nations League
Bronze medal – third place	2024 United States	Team
- * Club domestic league appearances and goals as of 17:10, 6 August 2025 (UTC) ‡ National team caps and goals as of 23:33, 30 June 2024 (UTC)

Michael Anthony James Hector (born 19 July 1992) is a professional footballer who plays as a centre-back. He is currently a free agent. Born in England, he represented Jamaica at the international level from 2015 to 2024

Hector began his career in the youth teams at Millwall and Thurrock before moving to Reading in 2009 where he joined the academy. In his first two seasons at the club he spent time on loan at a succession of non-league sides including Didcot Town, Oxford City and Horsham. Hector signed professional terms with Reading in May 2010 and joined League of Ireland side Dundalk on loan in February 2011. He made his Football League debut for Barnet in November 2011 and his successful spell with the club culminated with Hector winning the Young Player of the Season award. He signed a new contract at Reading in summer 2012 and soon after joined Shrewsbury Town on a six-month loan. Another temporary spell, this time with Aldershot Town followed, before moving to Cheltenham Town on loan in January 2013. He spent the first half of the 2013–14 season at Aberdeen and made his Reading debut in January 2014.

Hector was born in England but chose to represent Jamaica at the international level, being selected in their squad for the 2015 Copa América.

== Club career ==
=== Early career ===
Hector was born in East Ham, London. He began his career at Millwall before moving on to Thurrock where he played in the youth team. He was spotted by Reading after playing against them in a friendly for Barking Abbey and joined on scholarship terms at the start of the 2009–10 season.

=== Loan spells ===
==== Non-League ====
In October 2009, Hector joined Bracknell Town on loan, spending a month there before moving to Didcot Town in November. He went out on loan one further time that season, joining Conference South side Havant & Waterlooville in January 2010 though he made just one appearance as a substitute against Bromley. After playing in the reserves and gaining experience out on loan, Hector was rewarded with his first professional contract at Reading in May 2010.

The 2010–11 season again saw Hector go out on several loan spells. He joined Oxford City in August 2010 along with fellow Reading defender Jack Mills and made seven appearances during a one-month stay. Hector then moved to Horsham in November on an initial one-month loan and scored his first career goal on debut against Billericay Town. In December his loan was extended for a second month after which he returned to Reading having made 12 appearances, scoring once. His spell at Horsham was marred by three red cards, including two dismissals in successive games prompting manager John Maggs to accuse referees of "destroying" the young defender.

==== Dundalk ====
On 1 February 2011, days after returning from Horsham, Hector joined League of Ireland Premier Division side Dundalk on loan until 30 June. The red cards received during his time at Horsham meant Hector was unable to officially sign for Dundalk until 16 February though he played in four pre-season friendlies in the meantime. His competitive debut came on 4 March as a substitute in the opening day league fixture against Shamrock Rovers and he made a further 14 appearances in all competitions, scoring twice. Although Dundalk had initially hoped to extend Hector's loan for the rest of the season, he suffered a knee injury in May and he returned to Reading the following month.

==== The Football League ====
Hector spent the next five months working his way back to full fitness and on 3 November he joined League Two side Barnet on an initial one-month youth loan. After an impressive start to his spell his loan was extended for a further month, and, on 23 December, was renewed until the end of the season. He became a regular in the first team and at the end of the season he was voted Barnet's Young Player of the Season. With Hector's contract up at the end of the 2011–12 season, his performances at Barnet attracted the attention of other clubs with Norwich City and West Ham United reportedly interested in signing him.

No move materialised though and Hector signed a new contract at Reading in summer 2012. On 24 July he joined League One side Shrewsbury Town on a six-month loan but after falling out of contention, he returned to Reading on 7 November to train and play reserve games. He remained eligible to play for Shrewsbury until his loan ended although on 22 November Hector was recalled early and immediately sent out to Aldershot Town until 1 January. He made his Aldershot debut in central midfield in the FA Cup second round tie against Fleetwood Town on 1 December. After a successful start at Aldershot Hector had expressed an interest in extending his stay with the club and on 2 January it was confirmed that his loan had been renewed. Hector's stay at Aldershot finished on 29 January 2013 with manager Dean Holdsworth revealing he had hoped to extend his deal and was disappointed to lose him, adding that Hector had wanted to go to a "bigger club".

The day after his loan at Aldershot finished Hector made his third move of the 2012–13 season, this time on an initial one-month loan to Cheltenham Town. He made his debut in a 2–1 win over Torquay United on 2 February and earned praise from manager Mark Yates for his performance. On 28 February his loan was extended for another month and at the end of March it was renewed again, this time for the rest of the season. He scored his first Cheltenham goal with the winner against Gillingham on 13 April, securing a play-off spot for the club in the process. He played in both legs of the play-off semi-final against Northampton Town but could not prevent Cheltenham losing 2–0 on aggregate.

==== Aberdeen ====
On 26 July 2013, Hector joined Aberdeen on loan for six months. Upon his arrival Aberdeen manager Derek McInnes described him as "a big strong lad who comes with a good pedigree". In November, he scored his only goal for the Dons with a 20-yard strike in a 4–0 win against Partick Thistle. It was confirmed the following month that Hector's spell would not be extended due to an injury crisis at his parent club, though McInnes was hopeful that he could re-sign him at the end of the transfer window providing Reading's situation improved. Hector became a fans' favourite and despite not re-signing for the Dons, travelled to Glasgow to watch Aberdeen win the 2014 Scottish League Cup Final.

=== Reading ===
Hector made his debut as a late substitute in Reading's 7–1 win over Bolton Wanderers in January 2014. He made two more appearances off the bench before starting for the first time in place of Kaspars Gorkšs away at Brighton & Hove Albion in a game that finished 1–1. He went on to make nine appearances in total, including four starts, and at the end of the season was offered a new contract, which he signed in May, keeping him with the club until 2016 with the option of a further year. The following summer Hector signed a new three-year contract with Reading until the summer of 2018.

=== Chelsea ===
In a deadline day deal, Hector signed for Premier League club Chelsea on 1 September 2015. As part of the deal, he was sent back on loan to Reading for the 2015–16 season. Hector returned to Chelsea on 28 April 2016, a week before his loan deal was due to expire. After the arrival of Antonio Conte, Hector trained with the first-team and was included in the squad of the Austrian tour and U.S. tour during pre-season.

==== Eintracht Frankfurt (loan) ====
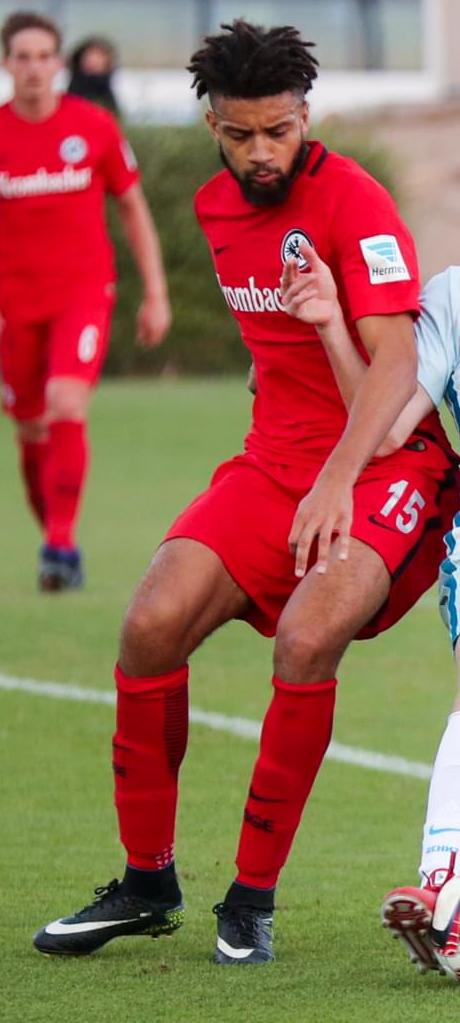
Hector playing for Eintracht Frankfurt in 2017

On 14 August 2016, Hector joined German side Eintracht Frankfurt on a season-long loan, making this his 13th loan in his career. On 21 August 2016, Hector made his debut against 1. FC Magdeburg in the first round of the DFB-Pokal. He was sent-off after receiving a second-yellow in 100th minute; Eintracht Frankfurt went on to advance to the second round after winning 4–3 in the penalty shootout. He scored his first Eintracht Frankfurt goal, a stoppage time equaliser against Hertha BSC on 24 September.

==== Hull City (loan) ====
On 27 July 2017, Hector signed a season-long loan deal with Hull City. He made his debut on the opening day of the season, 5 August 2017, away at Aston Villa, in a 1–1 draw. Hector scored his first goal for Hull City on 28 October 2017, with the final goal in a 2–3 defeat at home to Nottingham Forest.

==== Sheffield Wednesday (loan) ====
On 31 August 2018, Hector joined Sheffield Wednesday on a season-long loan deal. He scored his first goal for the club in a 1–0 win against Preston on 22 December 2018. He made 39 appearances for Sheffield Wednesday in all competitions, scoring two goals. At the end of the season, he was voted as the club's Player of the Year.

=== Fulham ===
On 5 September 2019, it was announced that Hector would join Fulham, for an undisclosed fee, in the upcoming January transfer window. In an unusual move, he trained with the Fulham team until then. This move, combined with the suspension of the season due to the COVID pandemic, resulted in the headline that he effectively played "three pre-seasons" during the 2019–20 season. He made his debut in a 2–1 win against Aston Villa in the FA Cup third round on 4 January 2020. On 4 August 2020, he started the 2020 EFL Championship play-off final which promoted Fulham back to the Premier League.

On 12 September 2020, Hector made his Premier League debut in a 3–0 defeat against Arsenal in the opening match of the 2020–21 campaign.

=== Charlton Athletic ===
On 31 January 2023, Hector signed for League One club Charlton Athletic on a short-term deal until the end of the season.

On 29 June 2023, Hector signed a new contract with the club ahead of the 2023–24 season.

On 3 May 2024, it was confirmed that Hector would leave Charlton Athletic when his contract expired.

=== Dagenham & Redbridge ===
On 8 March 2025, Hector joined Dagenham & Redbridge on a deal until the end of the season.

== International career ==
Hector was called up to the Jamaica national team on 27 February 2015 for friendly games against Venezuela and Cuba. Later that year he was included in their 2015 Copa América squad, having received international clearance to represent them. He made his debut on 13 June, playing the full 90 minutes as Jamaica lost 1–0 to holders Uruguay in their opening group match in Antofagasta.

== Personal life ==
Hector attended Langdon School, Newham and is the son of former Essex cricketer Pat Hector. He was eligible to play for both England and Jamaica at international level.

== Career statistics ==
=== Club ===
As of 15 March 2025

Appearances and goals by club, season and competition
Club	Season	League			National cup		League cup		Europe		Other		Total	
Club	Season	Division	Apps	Goals	Apps	Goals	Apps	Goals	Apps	Goals	Apps	Goals	Apps	Goals
Reading	2013–14	Championship	9	0	0	0	0	0	—		—		9	0
Reading	2014–15	Championship	41	3	6	0	2	0	—		—		49	3
Reading	2015–16	Championship	4	0	0	0	1	0	—		—		5	0
Reading	Total		54	3	6	0	3	0	0	0	0	0	63	3
Bracknell Town (loan)	2009–10	Hellenic League	3	0	0	0	—		—		1 (Note: Appearance in the Southern League Cup)	0	4	0
Didcot Town (loan)	2009–10	Southern League	3	0	0	0	—		—		0	0	3	0
Havant & Waterlooville (loan)	2009–10	Conference South	1	0	0	0	—		—		0	0	1	0
Oxford City (loan)	2010–11	Southern League	6	0	1	0	—		—		0	0	7	0
Horsham (loan)	2010–11	Isthmian League	11	1	0	0	—		—		1 (Note: Appearance in the Sussex Senior Cup)	0	12	1
Dundalk (loan)	2011	Irish Premier Division	11	2	0	0	1	0	—		3 (Note: Appearances in the Setanta Sports Cup)	0	15	2
Barnet (loan)	2011–12	League Two	27	2	1	0	0	0	—		3 (Note: Appearances in the Football League Trophy)	0	31	2
Shrewsbury Town (loan)	2012–13	League One	8	0	0	0	1	0	—		0	0	9	0
Aldershot Town (loan)	2012–13	League Two	8	1	3	0	0	0	—		0	0	11	1
Cheltenham Town (loan)	2012–13	League Two	20	1	0	0	0	0	—		2 (Note: Appearances in the League Two play-offs)	0	22	1
Aberdeen (loan)	2013–14	Scottish Premiership	20	1	1	0	1	0	—		—		22	1
Chelsea	2015–16	Premier League	0	0	0	0	0	0	0	0	—		0	0
Reading (loan)	2015–16	Championship	26	1	3	1	1	0	—		—		30	2
Eintracht Frankfurt (loan)	2016–17	Bundesliga	22	1	5	0	—		—		—		27	1
Hull City (loan)	2017–18	Championship	36	1	2	0	0	0	—		—		38	1
Sheffield Wednesday (loan)	2018–19	Championship	37	2	2	0	0	0	—		—		39	2
Fulham	2019–20	Championship	20	0	2	0	0	0	3	0	—		25	0
Fulham	2020–21	Premier League	4	0	2	0	2	0	0	0	—		8	0
Fulham	2021–22	Championship	4	0	1	0	2	0	0	0	—		7	0
Fulham	Total		28	0	5	0	4	0	3	0	0	0	40	0
Charlton Athletic	2022–23	League One	17	0	—		—		—		—		17	0
Charlton Athletic	2023–24	League One	34	0	0	0	1	0	—		1 (Note: One appearance in the EFL Trophy)	0	36	0
Charlton Athletic	Total		51	0	0	0	1	0	0	0	1	0	53	0
Dagenham & Redbridge	2024–25	National League	2	0	—		—		—		—		2	0
Career total			374	16	29	1	12	0	3	0	11	0	429	17

=== International ===
As of 30 June 2024

Appearances and goals by national team and year
National team	Year	Apps	Goals
Jamaica	2015	11	0
Jamaica	2016	8	0
Jamaica	2017	0	0
Jamaica	2018	3	0
Jamaica	2019	8	0
Jamaica	2020	2	0
Jamaica	2021	3	0
Jamaica	2022	0	0
Jamaica	2023	3	0
Jamaica	2024	7	0
Total		45	0

== Honours ==
Fulham

- EFL Championship play-offs: 2020

Jamaica

- CONCACAF Gold Cup runner-up: 2015
- CONCACAF Nations League third place: 2023–24

Individual

- Barnet Young Player of the Season: 2011–12
- Sheffield Wednesday Player of the Year: 2018–19
- CONCACAF Nations League Finals Best XI: 2024
