= Matt Penney =

English footballer (born 1998)

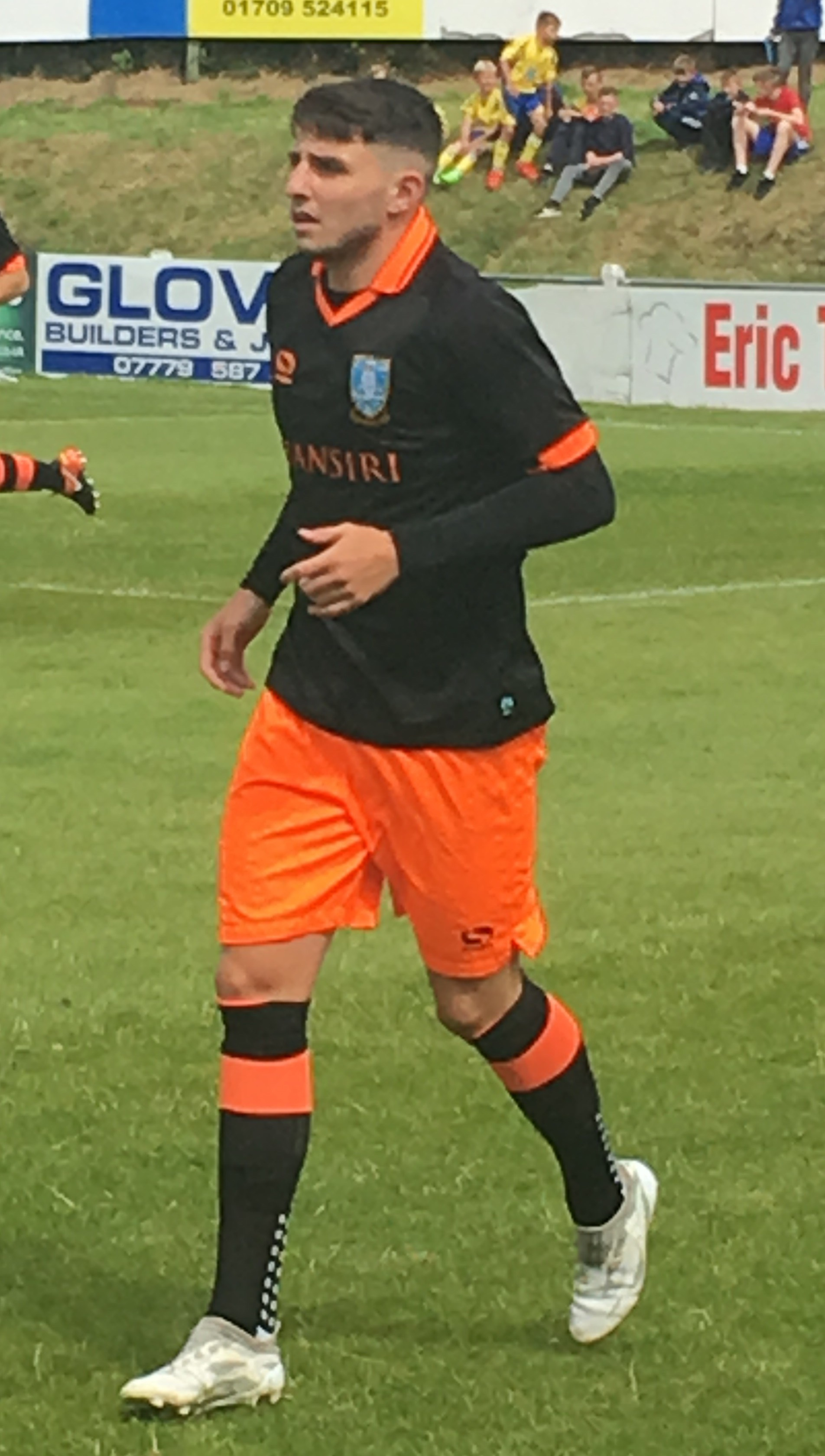
- Penney playing for Sheffield Wednesday in 2017

Personal information
- Full name: Matthew Luke Penney
- Date of birth: 11 February 1998 (age 28)
- Place of birth: Chesterfield, England
- Height: 5 ft 8 in (1.72 m)
- Positions: Full back; midfielder

Youth career
- 2006–2016: Sheffield Wednesday

Senior career*
Years	Team	Apps	(Gls)
2016–2021	Sheffield Wednesday	28	(0)
2017	→ Bradford City (loan)	1	(0)
2018	→ Mansfield Town (loan)	2	(0)
2019–2020	→ FC St. Pauli (loan)	17	(1)
2021–2023	Ipswich Town	22	(1)
2022–2023	→ Motherwell (loan)	16	(0)
2023	→ Charlton Athletic (loan)	5	(0)
2024–2025	Rochdale	1	(0)
2025	Altrincham	3	(0)
2025–2026	Aldershot Town	18	(2)
- * Club domestic league appearances and goals as of 20:00, 27 April 2026 (UTC)

Matthew Luke Penney (born 11 February 1998) is an English professional footballer who plays as a full back or midfielder.

Penney joined Sheffield Wednesday in 2006, progressing through the club's academy to make his senior debut in August 2018. During his time at Sheffield Wednesday, he spent time out on loan at Bradford City, Mansfield Town and FC St. Pauli. He signed for Ipswich Town in June 2021 and whilst there he had loan spells with Motherwell and Charlton Athletic. He later played in non-league with Rochdale and Altrincham.

== Career ==
=== Sheffield Wednesday ===
Born in Chesterfield, Penney began his career with Sheffield Wednesday at the age of eight years old, progressing through the club's academy and turning professional in October 2015.

He signed on loan for Bradford City on transfer deadline day, 31 January 2017, alongside Charlie Wyke, Jacob Hanson and Kevin Toner. He made his professional debut on 30 April 2017, appearing as a substitute in the last game of the regular 2016–17 season against Rochdale.

Penney signed on loan for Mansfield Town on transfer deadline day, 31 January 2018. He made his debut on 10 February against Swindon Town. Penny made 2 substitute appearances during his loan spell with Mansfield.

He made his first-team debut for Sheffield Wednesday on 16 August 2018, coming on as a second-half substitute in a 2–0 win against Sunderland in the EFL Cup. He made his league debut in the following match on 19 August against Brentford. He made 17 appearances during his first full season in the Sheffield Wednesday first-team.

In August 2019 he moved on loan to German side FC St. Pauli. He was sent-off on his St. Pauli debut on 26 August 2019 against Holstein Kiel. He scored his first senior goal on 22 February 2020, netting the second goal in a 2–0 win against Hamburger SV in the Hamburg derby. He made 18 appearances during his time on loan with St. Pauli, scoring once.

On 4 June 2020, he signed a new one-year contract at Sheffield Wednesday, keeping him with the club until the end of the 2020–21 season. He made his first appearance of the 2020–21 season on 5 September against Walsall. Penny made 15 appearances in all competitions during the season.

On 20 May 2021 it was announced that he would leave Sheffield Wednesday at the end of the season, following the expiry of his contract.

=== Ipswich Town ===
On 29 June 2021, Penney joined Ipswich Town on a free transfer, signing a two-year deal with the option of an additional years' extension.

On 25 August 2022, Penney joined Scottish Premiership side Motherwell on a six-month loan deal. he returned to Ipswich in January 2023 after the expiry of his loan.

On 21 January 2023, Penney joined Charlton Athletic on loan until the end of the 2022–23 season.

=== Non-league ===
In November 2024, after a season without a club, he signed for National League side Rochdale on non-contract forms. He departed the club in January 2025.

On 18 February 2025, Penney joined Altrincham. He was released at the end of the season.

On 18 July 2025, Penney joined National League side Aldershot Town. On 27 April 2026, it was announced that Penney would leave the club at the end of his contract in June.

== Style of play ==
Primarily an attacking full back, Penney can also play as a wing back and as a midfielder.

== Career statistics ==
As of 25 April 2026

Appearances and goals by club, season and competition
Club	Season	League			National Cup		League Cup		Other		Total	
Club	Season	Division	Apps	Goals	Apps	Goals	Apps	Goals	Apps	Goals	Apps	Goals
Sheffield Wednesday	2016–17	Championship	0	0	0	0	0	0	0	0	0	0
Sheffield Wednesday	2017–18	Championship	0	0	0	0	0	0	—		0	0
Sheffield Wednesday	2018–19	Championship	16	0	0	0	1	0	—		17	0
Sheffield Wednesday	2019–20	Championship	0	0	0	0	0	0	—		0	0
Sheffield Wednesday	2020–21	Championship	12	0	1	0	2	0	—		15	0
Sheffield Wednesday	Total		28	0	1	0	3	0	0	0	32	0
Bradford City (loan)	2016–17	League One	1	0	0	0	0	0	0	0	1	0
Mansfield Town (loan)	2017–18	League Two	2	0	0	0	0	0	0	0	2	0
St. Pauli (loan)	2019–20	2. Bundesliga	17	1	1	0	—		—		18	1
Ipswich Town	2021–22	League One	22	1	2	0	0	0	2 (Note: Appearance(s) in Football League Trophy)	0	26	1
Ipswich Town	2022–23	League One	0	0	0	0	0	0	0	0	0	0
Ipswich Town	Total		22	1	2	0	30	0	2	0	26	1
Motherwell (loan)	2022–23	Scottish Premiership	16	0	0	0	2	0	0	0	18	0
Charlton Athletic (loan)	2022–23	League One	5	0	—		—		—		5	0
Rochdale	2024–25	National League	1	0	0	0	0	0	1 (Note: Appearance in the National League Cup)	0	2	0
Altrincham	2024–25	National League	3	0	0	0	0	0	0	0	3	0
Aldershot Town	2025–26	National League	18	2	0	0	0	0	3	0	21	2
Career total			112	4	4	0	5	0	6	0	127	4
