= Frederik Fisker Nielsen =

Danish footballer (born 1998)

Personal information
- Full name: Frederik Fisker Nielsen
- Date of birth: 7 February 1998 (age 28)
- Place of birth: Denmark
- Height: 2.01 m (6 ft 7 in)
- Position: Centre-back

Youth career
- –2014: Viborg
- 2014–2016: Nottingham Forest

Senior career*
Years	Team	Apps	(Gls)
2016–2017	Nottingham Forest	0	(0)
2017–2019	Sheffield Wednesday	3	(0)
2019–2022	Skive	56	(1)

International career
2013	Denmark U16	4	(0)
2014	Denmark U17	2	(0)
2017	Denmark U19	1	(0)
- * Club domestic league appearances and goals as of 15:17, 12 July 2022 (UTC)

Frederik Fisker Nielsen (born 7 February 1998) is a Danish football player who plays as a centre-back.

== Club career ==
=== Sheffield Wednesday ===
Fisker joined Sheffield Wednesday in September 2017.

In January 2018 he made his first team debut for the club, playing the whole game as Wednesday beat Carlisle United in the third round replay of the FA Cup.

=== Skive IK ===
On 25 September 2019 it was confirmed, that Fisker had returned to Denmark and signed a contract for the rest of 2019 with Skive IK. On 21 January 2019 he signed a new contract until the summer 2021. Fisker left Skive at the end of the 2021–22 season.

=== Career statistics ===
As of 7 May 2019.

Club	Season	League		FA Cup		League Cup		Other		Total	
Club	Season	App	Goals	App	Goals	App	Goals	App	Goals	App	Goals
Sheffield Wednesday
Sheffield Wednesday	2017–18	3	0	1	0	0	0	0	0	4	0
Sheffield Wednesday	2018–19	0	0	0	0	2	0	0	0	2	0
Total		3	0	1	0	2	0	0	0	6	0
