= 2014–15 Sheffield Wednesday F.C. season =

English football club season

Sheffield Wednesday
- Owner: Dejphon Chansiri
- Head Coach: Stuart Gray
- Stadium: Hillsborough
- Championship: 13th
- FA Cup: Round 3 (eliminated by Manchester City)
- League Cup: Round 3 (eliminated by Manchester City)
- Top goalscorer: League: Atdhe Nuhiu (8); All: Atdhe Nuhiu (11)
- Highest home attendance: 29,848 (vs. Reading)
- Lowest home attendance: 16,881 (vs. Bournemouth)
- Average home league attendance: 21,991
Home colours	Away colours

During the 2014–15 football season, Sheffield Wednesday F.C. competed in three professional football competitions. Sheffield Wednesday competed in the 2014–15 Football League Championship (finishing 13th), 2014–15 FA Cup, and the 2014–15 Football League Cup. It was the Owls' third consecutive season in the Football League Championship, having secured promotion from League One in the 2011–12 season, securing Championship safety on the last day of the 2012–13 season and securing a 16th-place finish last season. The Football League season kicked off at the beginning of August, along with the League Cup in the same month. Meanwhile, with Sheffield Wednesday being within the top two tiers of the English football league system, the club did not enter the FA Cup until the beginning of January 2015, where they entered at Round 3 of the competition.

== Overview ==
=== Pre-season ===
Before pre-season began in July 2014, the first players that were to leave the club were announced. The following players were released from the club just three-days after Sheffield Wednesday's last fixture of their 2013–14 campaign: two goalkeepers Adam Davies and Arron Jameson; defenders Anthony Gardner, Martin Taylor and one of the fan favourites Miguel Llera; midfielder David Prutton and the longest serving player at the club with over 250-appearances Jermaine Johnson. Probably the biggest shock though, even though the player was injury-prone, one of the fan-favourites Réda Johnson, whom was also released. Meanwhile, keeper Chris Kirkland, midfielder José Semedo, and defenders Glenn Loovens and Oguchi Onyewu were offered new contracts at the club.

Sheffield Wednesday's first pre-season fixture was announced on 10 May, the club confirmed that they would be playing Newcastle United at Hillsborough on 30 July. A few days after that, Sheffield Wednesday announced two more pre-season fixtures. They would be playing their South Yorkshire rival Barnsley away at Oakwell on 2 August and playing against Bury away at Gigg Lane on 18 July. On 16 May, Sheffield Wednesday announced their fourth pre-season fixture playing another South Yorkshire rival against Doncaster Rovers at the Keepmoat Stadium on 27 July. Three days later, they announced their first fixture in the pre-season against York City on 12 July. Sheffield Wednesday announced they would be playing against FK Čukarički during their tour of Slovenia on 23 July. However, FK Čukarički later pulled out of the friendly fixture and was replaced with FC Arsenal Tula on 3 July.

On 10 June, massive news was announced at Sheffield Wednesday Football Club. Rumours of the club's ownership being taken-over by Azerbaijani businessman Hafiz Mammadov was confirmed. This saw the ownership of the club pass from Chairman Milan Mandarić, who had owned the club since 2010, in which he saved the club from administration, cleared the club from the majority of its debts, invested into the team to gain promotion to the Football League Championship in the 2011–12 season and has since stabilised the club in the Championship. Milan Mandarić can be classed as a legend at the club, due to saving the Owls from potential extinction and climbing the English football league ladder. Milan Mandarić had this to say: "I am delighted to have concluded a deal with Hafiz, he is a true football man and I have no doubt whatsoever that I am handing over control to someone with a real passion for the game and the ability to carry on the work I started three years ago to return Sheffield Wednesday back to the top division of English football. It's something that the wonderful supporters of this Club deserve having remained so loyal throughout the difficult times prior to my arrival. On my first day at the Club I promised the supporters two things; firstly I would ensure that when I left we would be in far better shape than when I arrived and more importantly, that I would only hand over ownership when I found the right man for the Club and I sincerely believe I have delivered on both undertakings". Meanwhile, Hafiz Mammadov is a successful businessman whom owns Baghlan Group (a company that specialises in oil, gas, construction and transportation), and also owns Azerbaijan football club Baku FC and French team RC Lens, along with having shares in La Liga champions Atlético Madrid and F.C. Porto. Mammadov is known to have a quieter, more private approach with his work and is thought to have bought the club for around €50 million. Hafiz Mammadov had this to say: "I am a passionate football fan with enormous respect for English football. I have been looking at investing in England for some time but I was determined to find the right Club. I am hugely ambitious and feel the Owls match my passion and desire for success and represent our motto of Azerbaijan Land of Fire. I promise the supporters I will work extremely hard to bring the success everyone so rightly craves." On 9 July, rumours occurred across the internet that Sheffield Wednesday owner to be, Hafiz Mammadov, had been arrested by police in his home country of Azerbaijan. Mammadov is still yet to have clarified and confirmed the takeover with the Football League and has still yet to make payments to the French football league on behalf of his other ownership of RC Lens. Lens have had their promotion to Ligue 1 suspended because of this. However, just after 5pm that day and Hafiz Mammadov released a statement saying: "Certain unfounded rumours have been spread in the press over my supposed arrest and imprisonment in Azerbaijan, which I obviously strongly deny, and which was immediately denied by State Border Guards. It seems today that false and malicious speculation over my situation is being used with the aim to create confusion and doubt over my financial holdings and commitments. There are no grounds for the allegations made by the press, and I will take all necessary legal actions against whoever has initiated these false rumours with the aim to harm my family and me". This statement would have been of grate relief to the fans of Sheffield Wednesday.

A week later on 17 June, and the 2014–15 Football League Cup draw was made, and the Owls were drawn at home against the oldest club in the football league – Notts County. The game is to be played in the week commencing 11 August 2014. A day after at 9am the 2014–15 Football League Championship fixtures were announced, with the Owls facing Brighton & Hove Albion away on the first day of the season on 9 August. This is then followed up by home games against Derby County and Millwall. Wednesday face Blackpool at home on Boxing Day and Watford away on the last day of the season, which ends 2 May 2015. The first derby fixture is against Leeds United on 4 October, and the team play Rotherham United for the first time of the season on 8 November at home.

On 3 June Sheffield Wednesday announced the first signings for the club, Matt Young from Southampton and Ed Sanders from Stoke City. Both young defender's signed on one-year deals and will feature in the Development Squad. Just under a week later and Ryan Croasdale signed from Preston North End, also on a one-year contract and will feature in the Development Squad. On 24 June, Sheffield Wednesday made their fourth Development Squad signing in Paul McElroy from Hull City on a one-year contract. However, on 19 July McElroy decided to cancel his one-year contract at Sheffield Wednesday due to some personal terms. The first signing for the first-team squad was announced on 7 July, with Ireland international goalkeeper Keiren Westwood signing on a 2-year deal after being released from Sunderland. One day later, goalkeeper Chris Kirkland re-signed with Sheffield Wednesday on a one-year contract. Also later on the same day, the Owls signed last seasons loanee Sam Hutchinson on a free transfer from Chelsea. Hutchinson signs on a two-year contract, with rumours that Wednesday battled off Millwall and West Bromwich Albion for Hutchinson's signature. On 10 July, fan favourite José Semedo resigned a one-year contract at Sheffield Wednesday. Three days later, Glenn Loovens signed a new one-year contract at Sheffield Wednesday, Stuart Gray later announced that he would be the captain of Sheffield Wednesday for the upcoming season. At the end of July, Sheffield Wednesday completed a deal for Leeds United defender Tom Lees for an undisclosed fee. 3-days before the first game of the new season and it was confirmed that trialist Dejan Kelhar had signed for the club on a short contract for a free transfer. Later on though and bad news for fans of Sheffield Wednesday as they lost one of their best players – Michail Antonio. He signed for Nottingham Forest for a fee of £1.5 million. Antonio scored some vital goals in Wednesday's 2011-12 Football League One promotion, and was the Owls' top scorer the next season.

Wednesday's first-team took part in their first pre-season friendly 10-days into July, as the Owls travelled to face York City. An own-goal and a fantastic long-distance strike from Chris Maguire both in the first-half saw the Owls win the game 2–0. Just over a week later and Sheffield Wednesday played their second pre-season friendly away to Bury. The Owls struck just three-minutes into the game with a goal by Jacques Maghoma. However, Bury equalised 5-minutes before half-time to make it all level at the break. Atdhe Nuhiu headed a goal in the second-half, while Giles Coke rounded off a 3–1 victory to Sheffield Wednesday. A day after this game and Wednesday flew out to Slovenia for a week, in the middle of which they played a game against Russian side FC Arsenal Tula. The Owls took an early lead just three-minutes in with Michail Antonio being on target, however 5-minutes later and Arsenal Tula equalised. The game was fairly even throughout, but with 5-minutes to go of the full 90-minutes and Arsenal Tula scored to win the game 2–1. Sunday 27 July and the Owls faced local rivals Doncaster Rovers in a friendly match. Goals either half from Atdhe Nuhiu and Michail Antonio gave Sheffield Wednesday a two-nil lead, but two-goals in 15-minutes by Doncaster meant the match finished level at 2–2. Sheffield Wednesday's only home pre-season game came the following Wednesday as the team faced Premier League side Newcastle United. Although the Owls had the majority of possession, had a few chances (including hitting the bar), it was a second-half strike by Newcastle that was the difference as the Owls lost 0–1. Sheffield Wednesday kicked off their last pre-season friendly away to local rivals Barnsley at 1pm on Saturday 2 August. A tight game finished 1–1, with the Owls equalising in the second-half thanks to Kieran Lee.

=== August ===
Hours before Sheffield Wednesday undertook their first competitive game of the season away to Brighton & Hove Albion a signing was confirmed. 21-year-old striker Stevie May signed on a 4-year contract from St Johnstone. May has a great goalscoring record, seeing him score 67-goals in 118 career appearances. Soon after and the first game of the season kicked off and an even game where the Owls had the majority of the possession in the first-half saw its opening goal when Giles Coke curled the ball fantastically into the top corner of the net. 5-minutes into the second half and Brighton went down to ten-men after a high-footed challenge saw a player gain a straight red card. Although, Wednesday looked to push on from this point, Brighton had a great period which saw débutant Keiren Westwood make a fantastic save and the other débutant Tom Lees clear off the line. The last 15-minutes and Wednesday managed to hold out for a fantastic victory away from home. It took 3-months last season for the Owls to win their first game of the season, this time round it took one-day. Later on in the week and Wednesday played their first home game of the season in the midweek League Cup game against Notts County. Just two-minutes into the game and Jacques Maghoma cut inside onto his right foot and scored the first goal of the game. 10-minutes and a couple of chances later and the Owls were 2–0 up thanks to Gary Madine comfortably tapping in a cross at the back post. It was Madine's first goal since coming back from his time in prison last season. Atdhe Nuhiu had 5 key chances, mainly headers, before he did finally score in the second-half. Nuhiu and Madine did come close again before full-time, but the Owls strolled through into the second round winning 3–0. The Owls' third game within the first week of the new season was at home to last seasons play-off finalists Derby County. Wednesday started the brighter of the two teams in a contest that involved chances for both sides. In the first-half Jacques Maghoma linked up with Nuhiu before firing just wide, Chris Maguire hit the underside of the bar from a free-kick, Sam Hutchinson had a header cleared off the line and débutant Stevie May had a shot go just wide. Derby came out playing better in the second half and had two one-on-one's, but keeper Keiren Westwood made saves on both occasions. An entertaining game finished goalless, with Sheffield Wednesday keeping three clean sheets in the first three games of the season.

Another mid-week game came at home to Millwall, a team who had got off to a great start to the beginning of the new season and also had yet to concede a goal. The first chance fell to Millwall when they had a free-kick go just wide of the target. Compared to the previous game against Derby this game seemed a much less entertaining game, with the next best chance falling to Atdhe Nuhiu whose header went over the bar. Into the second half and a free-kick for handball was awarded to the Owls and Chris Maguire stepped up and fired the ball into the back of the net with the help of a deflection on the way. Millwall stepped up their game from this point, but only created half chances as they failed to break Wednesday's defence down. However, with just over 5-minutes to go and a Millwall player and Keiren Westwood seemed to just clash/bump into each other in the area. Although, the referee saw this as a foul and gave a penalty. But, justice was served as Millwall failed to equalise from the spot and instead hit the post. Into the dying seconds of five-minutes added time and Millwall managed to find space for a shot and scored with virtually the last kick of the game, with the match ending 1–1. A few days later and Sheffield Wednesday faced one of the few trips up North to play Middlesbrough. 6-minutes in and Nuhiu finished home on the line after a corner saw the ball continue to bounce in the box, but Nuhiu did not give up until the ball was in the back of the net. New signing Stevie May nearly doubled the Owls' lead as a great finger tip save saw his shot hit the post. Atdhe Nuhiu was soon involved again as his flick on saw Stevie May score his first goal for the club with a delightful finish into the far corner. 2–0 up at half-time and things could not have been going better for Wednesday, that is until it did in the second-half. A free-kick saw Nuhiu head home his second goal of the game. Just under 20-minutes to go through and captain Glenn Loovens fouled a man in the box and Middlesbrough scored the resultant penalty kick. Sheffield Wednesday hit the woodwork again, and then Middlesbrough were awarded another penalty. A powerful shot in the box hit Loovens on the arm, something he probably could not do anything about, but Middlesbrough did not care as they scored again. Into the dying seconds and Middlesbrough nearly equalised as cross could not quite reach the feet of one of their players. 3-points though it was for Sheffield Wednesday, with the result looking kind on Middlesbrough's behalf.

The next game for Sheffield Wednesday was in the second round of the League Cup against Premier League opposition Burnley away at Turf Moor. Atdhe Nuhiu scored the winning goal from a penalty after Jérémy Hélan was brought down and secured a place in the 3rd round against the defending Premier League and League Cup champions Manchester City. One day before the match against Nottingham Forest, Sheffield Wednesday signed Hallam Hope on loan until 2 January from Everton. The opponents Nottingham Forest was currently first-place having picked up 10 points in their first four games. In the 37th minute, former Sheffield Wednesday player Michail Antonio wriggled into space and lifted the ball into the box, where Henri Lansbury had ghosted in unattended to nudge a free header past Keiren Westwood to give the away team the lead into the first-half. Sheffield Wednesday dominated the second-half, the closest chance came from Atdhe Nuhiu in the 90th minute forcing an impressive save from Karl Darlow. It finished 0–1 to Nottingham Forest and it was Wednesday's first defeat in the season. Immediately after the game, Sheffield Wednesday signed free-agent Claude Dielna on a three-year contract.

=== September ===
On deadline day, Sheffield Wednesday signed ex Real Madrid player, Royston Drenthe from Reading on loan until 2 January. On 4 September, Sheffield Wednesday chairman Milan Mandarić announced that takeover talks between him and Hafiz Mammadov has broken down due to his difficulties in Azerbaijan. He quoted, "Our supporters were extremely excited when the takeover was announced, like me they believed that Mr. Mammadov offered a great opportunity for the club, in hindsight my desire to please our supporters probably clouded my decision to grant further time for him to complete the process." The next game was between Bolton Wanderers and it was a very dominating display from Sheffield Wednesday. In the first-half, Stevie May smashed the ball in the back of the net. However, it was harshly disallowed due to the referee claiming that Atdhe Nuhiu had fouled the defender in the build-up to Stevie May's shot and denying his second goal of the season. The visitors then went close again when Chris Maguire had Andy Lonergan beaten all ends up with a crisp finish but Matt Mills cleared the ball off the line. Those were the best chances of the game as they ended up having a total of 24 shots and failed to capitalize on getting a goal, which ended in a disappointing 0–0 draw. Birmingham City was next up in their second straight away game. The first half was a stalemate, but in the second-half Sheffield Wednesday were looking much more likely after the interval and gave Birmingham City cause for concern with a flurry of dangerous attacks. And they got their reward for their hard efforts as Stevie May scored the goal to give the Owls the lead just after the hour mark. At the very late stage of the game, substitute Jérémy Hélan scored the second goal after Chris Maguire picked up possession in the area and teed up the pace who thumped home from 12 yards to seal their third away win in four games.

The next game at Hillsborough was against Reading in front of a packed crowd. During the first-half, Sheffield Wednesday conceded a penalty after Giles Coke brought down Glenn Murray. Fortunately though, Keiren Westwood made a terrific stop from Murray's penalty and finished 0–0 in the first-half. Reading had a series of more chances in the second, but Sheffield Wednesday made them pay for their missed opportunities, as Stevie May put in a deflected free-kick to give the mighty owls their first victory at Hillsborough since March. Later in the week, it was the 3rd-round League Cup game against Premier League giants Manchester City. In the first-half, Sheffield Wednesday held their own and managed to keep it 0–0 in 45 minutes. But in the second-half, Manchester City scored straight away with Frank Lampard tucked in James Milner's cross soon after the restart before Edin Džeko swept in a pass from Jesús Navas, who added a ferocious drive. Yaya Touré converted a penalty after Lampard was tripped by Kamil Zayatte. He was sent off as Džeko's header, José Ángel Pozo got his début goal and another Lampard strike sank the Owls' 10 men and the final score was 7–0.

Back in the Championship, Sheffield Wednesday faced Cardiff City away in looking to continue their 2-game league winning streak. They made a bright start as Stevie May rounded the goalkeeper David Marshall inside six minutes but having his shot cleared off the line by Fábio. Then Cardiff took the lead at 39th minute, Sean Morrison with a thumping header past Keiren Westwood. Sheffield Wednesday tied it early in the second-half, Chris Maguire fizzed in a low cross from the right, prompting Morrison to slide in and inadvertently prod the ball beyond Marshall for an own-goal. The hosts regained the lead through Anthony Pilkington, who juggled the ball deftly and volleyed in from 12 yards. It finished 2–1 to Cardiff City and ended Sheffield Wednesday's unbeaten away league run. Next game was against in-form Ipswich Town who were on a 4-game winning streak into the game at Hillsborough. The hosts took an early lead through Atdhe Nuhiu's near-post header from the following corner from Jacques Maghoma. Wednesday had goals disallowed for infringements either side of half time. Kamil Zayatte nodded home after a brilliant reflex save by Dean Gerken, only for referee Darren Bond to blow for a foul. After the break Nuhiu saw his finish ruled out for offside, before Williams made it all square in the 62nd minute. He took the ball down on his chest at the edge of the box before hitting a low shot beyond Keiren Westwood and in off the far post and the game finished at 1–1.

=== October ===
The first game of October saw the Owls take trip down to local rivals Leeds United. The home team were first to carve a clear cut chance as Tommaso Bianchi fed for Mowatt but Keiren Westwood was sharp off as line to narrow the angle and make the stop. Souleymane Doukara then placed his slide rule finish just wide of the target and Rodolph Austin brought another smart save from Westwood as Leeds looked the more likely to score. In the second half, Jacques Maghoma led the charge and whipped in a dangerous centre for Maguire to bury first time into the bottom the corner. With ten minutes left on the clock Leeds found a leveller. The ball fell kindly to Bellusci in the area from a free kick and the defender dispatched his strike neatly into the corner and the game finished 1–1. After the international break, Sheffield Wednesday returned to league duty at home against Watford under new boss Slaviša Jokanović. It was a bad day for the Owls as Sam Hutchinson was stretchered off after making his return to the first team since his back injury in the third league game of the season. Then Matěj Vydra broke the offside trap, albeit in the most tight of circumstances, and advanced to play in Odion Ighalo, who slotted into an empty net. Moments after Keiren Westwood received treatment for a knock on the knee, Watford seized the advantage and doubled their lead. The game was all over on the 69th minute as Vydra scored Watford's third goal of the game and it finished a heavy 3–0 defeat on home soil.

The next game faced a long trip to London against Brentford on Tuesday night. The main chances of the night saw Kieran Lee rebound hit the underside of the bar after Jérémy Hélan's shot was blocked. Jonathan Douglas had his attempt to put the home side in the lead headed clear from the line by Liam Palmer before Jota drilled over the bar, the match ended in a 0–0 draw. Gary Taylor-Fletcher signed a one-month loan deal from Leicester City. Sheffield Wednesday played against Norwich City at Hillsborough. And they started on the front foot, dominating the early exchanges against a Norwich side looking to reignite their early season spark. Stevie May headed just wide following a swift three-man move but Norwich countered a few minutes later and Westwood saved superbly from Lewis Grabban. And the impetus certainly stayed with Wednesday. Gary Taylor-Fletcher had a half chance on 67 minutes after a fine pass from Claude Dielna before Liam Palmer smashed into the side-netting having taken a clever back heel from Stevie May into his stride. But on 69 minutes, the away team came closest to breaking the deadlock. Gary O'Neil's free kick found Cameron Jerome in space and his header seemed goalbound only for Keiren Westwood to delve into the top drawer and prevent the opening goal. The Republic of Ireland international promptly repeated the feat moments later to deny substitute Nathan Redmond, whose blistering low drive was diverted past the post. And if that were not enough, Westwood again kept the Owls in the game with 13 minutes to go, this time thwarting Jerome from close range. It would have been harsh for Wednesday to lose the game and they duly held out to record another clean sheet – their second in a week and ninth of the season.

=== November ===
On 1 November, Sheffield Wednesday was away at Charlton Athletic. The visitors took a deserved first-half lead when loanee Royston Drenthe found the net with a crisp long-range effort. The forward had fired a left-footed short narrowly wide of the post before opening the scoring with a quality run and shot, Wednesday's first goal in four matches. Five minutes after coming on, Igor Vetokele tapped in Rhoys Wiggins' cross to draw the relieved hosts level in the 70th minute, the game ended in a stalemate. Few days later, Sheffield Wednesday was up against Bournemouth at home. It was certainly a very even game until latest goalscorer Royston Drenthe was sent off for a 2nd bookable offence. Which resulted in the away side scoring five minutes later through a counter-attack from Andrew Surman. Bournemouth sealed victory on the 69th minute from a goal by Ryan Fraser. Next up was local rivals Rotherham United at Hillsborough. Sheffield Wednesday had the first chance of the game but Gary Taylor-Fletcher flicked Hélan's cross just past the post. The hosts nearly broke their home duck in bizarre circumstances when Atdhe Nuhiu pressurised Kirk Broadfoot into over-hitting his backpass to Adam Collin who saw his sliced clearance go just wide. Then a controversial moment happened when Sheffield Wednesday believed that they should have had a penalty, which was denied by the ref Nigel Miller and finished 0–0.

During the international break, Sheffield Wednesday striker Stevie May got his first-ever international cap for Scotland in their 3–1 defeat against England. Couple days before the game against Huddersfield Town, Sheffield Wednesday brought in their fourth loan signing this season, this time bringing in Lewis McGugan from Watford and made his first start in that match. The home side best chances fell to Nahki Wells, who twice had efforts blocked by Keiren Westwood. Stevie May unbelievably had his shot come off the post and crossbar to deny his fourth goal of this campaign. Another penalty was denied in the late stages of the match when Chris Maguire was tackled by Joel Lynch, but the referee declared that The Owls forward was diving and booked him for it and the game ended in another 0–0 draw. Next game was back at Hillsborough against Wigan Athletic. The away side scored the first goal from a corner-kick on the 26th minute from Chris McCann. Then immediately from kick-off, Sheffield Wednesday equalized when Atdhe Nuhiu and he teed up unmarked strike partner May for a simple close-range finish past Latics goalkeeper Scott Carson. May scored his second of the game and turned the contest in the Owls' favour in the 71st minute. He met Maguire's cross from the left and his header hit both posts before being adjudged to have crossed the line. 2–1 was the final result and turned Sheffield Wednesday's eleven game winless into a four-game unbeaten run.

=== December ===
Looking for win for the second game in a row in their first match of December, Sheffield Wednesday took on Blackburn Rovers at Ewood Park. Kieran Lee gave the visitors the lead on three minutes after pouncing on a mistake from Steele who failed to hold on to Stevie May's initial shot. Blackburn equalised when Rhodes nodded down into the path of Baptiste who wrapped his foot over the ball to fire past Westwood from 10 yards. Wednesday missed a glorious chance to retake the lead after 36 minutes when Glenn Loovens headed over a Royston Drenthe free-kick from five yards. Westwood kept the scores level in the second half when he saved a thunderous volley from Tunnicliffe and tipped over the crossbar. David Dunn then flashed a shot wide for Rovers before substitute Claude Dielna sealed the win for the visitors late-on. His 25-yard shot took a deflection as it flew past goalkeeper Jason Steele and secured a dramatic win for Stuart Gray's side. Next game was at Hillsborough against Wolves. The home side went close early on when Stevie May rounded Wolves goalkeeper Carl Ikeme, only for Richard Stearman to clear his shot off the line. Loovens then rose to meet Chris Maguire's corner but headed inches wide and Royston Drenthe went just as close with a sweet volley. The game looked set to end goalless when Leon Clarke, who played for Wednesday between 2007 and 2010, buried the winner. Then The Owls faced a trip to London at Craven Cottage against Fulham. Tom Lees failed to get a good connection at the far post when free, before Marcus Bettinelli made a good save to keep out Chris Maguire's drive and Kostas Stafylidis cleared off the line from Stevie May. Fulham broke the deadlock in the 34th minute when McCormack fired in a superb free-kick after Glenn Loovens had conceded the foul. Hutchinson doubled the advantage when he nodded in from Bryan Ruiz's free-kick for his first goal for the club. The third came midway through the second half as Christensen converted from Hugo Rodallega's pass, before Woodrow added a fourth from the spot after Patrick Roberts had been fouled by Claude Dielna.

On Boxing Day, Sheffield Wednesday faced bottom Blackpool. On the 39th minute, Sheffield Wednesday received a penalty after Peter Clarke fouled Stevie May and Chris Maguire stepped up and scored his third goal of the season. They had their chances with Chris Eagles shooting wide and Nathan Delfouneso having a curling effort saved after Wednesday's opener. The Owls went close to doubling their advantage when Maguire's low cross from the left deflected onto the crossbar, before Miller was booked for turning Tony McMahon's centre into the Wednesday goal with a hand. Home goalkeeper Keiren Westwood brilliantly kept out Ishmael Miller's three-yard header, before Miller received a second caution for a late tackle on Tom Lees. Then Sheffield Wednesday faced Wigan Athletic in their final game of 2014. Lewis McGugan was a constant threat for Stuart Gray's side and struck from range to test Scott Carson, while at the other end, McClean pounced on Ben Watson's delivery to score after the break, only for the linesman's flag to cut short his celebration. Wednesday, the lowest scorers in the division before kick-off, shaded proceedings and though a stalemate looked likely, they took advantage of Callum McManaman's recklessness after doing a two-footed challenge on Claude Dielna. Nuhiu saw a header saved by Carson quickly after the dismissal but beat the Wigan keeper a minute later when he powered home Jérémy Hélan's cross to secure Wednesday's fourth win in six matches.

=== January ===
First game of the new year was the FA Cup Third Round match-up against familiar opponents and current Premier League champions Manchester City. It was a brilliant first-half performance from the away side, scoring the opening goal after 14 minutes when Atdhe Nuhiu fired home at the end of a flowing move down the right that also involved Stevie May and Kieran Lee. But in the second-half, the hosts equalised almost immediately after sending on their two playmakers Silva and Nasri, with the pair linking up on the left of the Owls' box and playing in Milner to convert his second goal of the season. Manuel Pellegrini's men took control from that point and Milner shot wide, while Silva had an effort well saved as the Premier League side desperately looked to avoid a replay. They got their wish a minute into stoppage time when Jesús Navas played the ball across the box and Milner nipped in front of his marker to tap into an empty net. The scoreline finished 2–1 to Man City. Sheffield Wednesday returned next week in an away league fixture against Nottingham Forest. In the first-half, chances were rare at both ends, Wednesday made the most of their first real threat right at the end of the half. Kane denied Nuhiu's effort, only for Lee to throw himself at the rebound and squeeze in the opener. Nottingham Forest keeper Dorus de Vries, making his first league start of the season ahead of Karl Darlow, could do little five minutes after the break as Maguire nipped into the box after latching onto a poor Jack Hobbs clearance and smashed home his fourth goal of the season. Sheffield Wednesday would keep the clean sheet for the fourteenth time this season as they won 2–0.

After that Sheffield Wednesday returned for a home fixture for the first time in 2015 against Bolton Wanderers. The away team took an early lead when Liam Feeney put the ball in the net in the second minute of the game. Then they doubled that lead when Darren Pratley scored in the 25th minute. Looking to reply immediately, Sheffield Wednesday was awarded a penalty three minutes later and Chris Maguire placed it perfectly in the right side of the net to make it 2–1. Wednesday head coach Stuart Gray brought on Sam Hutchinson as part of a double substitution in the 69th minute as the home side pushed forward, but he was shown a second yellow card after just 14 minutes on the field for a late challenge. Stevie May then thought he had equalised when he bundled the ball over the line after Atdhe Nuhiu's effort hit the bar, but he was controversially ruled offside by the assistant referee. That cost the match for Sheffield Wednesday and continued their poor home form in the Championship. Next match was against Birmingham City at Hillsborough. Winger Jacques Maghoma had a low shot saved by goalkeeper Darren Randolph in a poor quality first half. Then Clayton Donaldson, who had scored five times in his previous three games, narrowly failed to connect with a centre from left-back Jonathan Grounds just before the break before keeper Keiren Westwood was forced to turn over a powerful drive from winger David Cotterill. Things did not improve after the break as home striker Atdhe Nuhiu was off target with a couple of efforts and Cotterill shot wide for Birmingham and the match finished a stalemate. Two days later, Sheffield Wednesday was legitimately taken over this time from a Thai consortium led by businessman Dejphon Chansiri whose family owns Thai Union Group, acquired 100% stakes in the Championship. Milan Mandarić announced that he will step down as Chairman and as a director but will stay in an advisory role for Dejphon Chansiri. The first match under new ownership was against Reading. Both sides started at a frenetic pace and Simon Cox had the first chance of the game for Reading as he tried to bend the ball round Keiren Westwood's right hand, but the keeper made a decent save. Garath McCleary then dragged the ball wide from 10 yards after Nathaniel Chalobah fizzed the ball into the penalty area. But it was Pavel Pogrebnyak who made the breakthrough on the half-hour mark with a powerful header beyond the clutches of Westwood following a cross from Kelly. Nathaniel Chalobah, on loan from Chelsea, then despatched Garath McCleary's cross for his first Reading goal. The Owls were unlucky not to pull one back before half-time as Adam Federici flung himself low to his right to tip Baker's shot around the post. Reading were awarded a penalty after the break when substitute Jérémy Hélan crashed into the back of Pavel Pogrebnyak, but Robson-Kanu side-footed it straight into Westwood's hands. The game finished a 2–0 defeat for Sheffield Wednesday.

=== February ===
Deadline Day was one of the more exciting ones in a while for Sheffield Wednesday as there was multiple speculations on who Wednesday would sign as the takeover suggested that for once Sheffield Wednesday have the cash to splash. The first announcement of the day was Dejan Kelhar had re-signed his contract until the end of the season. The defender has been unlucky so far this season as his original 6-month contract deal was hindered with the fact he had been injured due to tearing his anterior cruciate ligament. Next announcement of the day was that Sheffield Wednesday have signed Sergiu Buș from CSKA Sofia for a rumoured £350,000 on a three-and-a-half-year contract. He has scored ten goals so far this season in nineteen appearances for CSKA Sofia. The next signing of the day was Marnick Vermijl who played for Manchester United, he only made one appearance for them this season in the Capital One Cup and he went on a season-long loan last season to NEC where he made twenty-eight appearances and scored three goals for them. The next signing was the return of Lewis McGugan on loan from Watford for the rest of the season. He made seven appearances in his first spell towards the end of 2014. There was one last signing on Deadline Day, in came Filipe Melo from Moreirense for an undisclosed fee.

== Players ==
As of 2 April 2015

=== First team ===
Note: Flags indicate national team as defined under FIFA eligibility rules; some limited exceptions apply. Players may hold more than one non-FIFA nationality.

No.	Pos.	Nation	Player
1	GK	IRL	Keiren Westwood
2	DF	ENG	Lewis Buxton
3	DF	ENG	Joe Mattock
4	MF	ENG	Sam Hutchinson
5	DF	NED	Glenn Loovens (captain)
6	MF	POR	José Semedo (vice-captain)
7	FW	SCO	Stevie May
8	DF	SCO	Liam Palmer
9	FW	AUT	Atdhe Nuhiu
10	MF	SCO	Chris Maguire
13	FW	NIR	Caolan Lavery
15	DF	ENG	Tom Lees
16	MF	SCO	Rhys McCabe

No.	Pos.	Nation	Player
17	DF	FRA	Jérémy Hélan
18	DF	GUI	Kamil Zayatte
19	MF	COD	Jacques Maghoma
20	MF	ENG	Kieran Lee
27	MF	WAL	Lloyd Isgrove (on loan from Southampton)
28	FW	ROU	Sergiu Buș
33	MF	POR	Filipe Melo
35	DF	FRA	Claude Dielna
36	DF	BEL	Marnick Vermijl
37	MF	ENG	Lewis McGugan (on loan from Watford)
43	GK	ENG	Chris Kirkland
44	DF	SLO	Dejan Kelhar
48	FW	ENG	Will Keane (on loan from Man Utd)

==== Out on loan ====
Note: Flags indicate national team as defined under FIFA eligibility rules; some limited exceptions apply. Players may hold more than one non-FIFA nationality.

No.	Pos.	Nation	Player
14	MF	ENG	Giles Coke (on loan at Bolton Wanderers)
21	MF	IRL	Paul Corry (on loan at Carlisle United)

No.	Pos.	Nation	Player
24	FW	ENG	Gary Madine (on loan at Blackpool)

=== Development squad ===
Note: Flags indicate national team as defined under FIFA eligibility rules; some limited exceptions apply. Players may hold more than one non-FIFA nationality.

No.	Pos.	Nation	Player
22	DF	POR	Rafael Floro
26	DF	ENG	William De Havilland
30	GK	ENG	Cameron Dawson
—	DF	ENG	Ed Sanders
—	MF	ENG	Ryan Croasdale

No.	Pos.	Nation	Player
—	MF	NIR	Simon Hanna
—	MF	ENG	Ryan Meadows
—	MF	ENG	Jack Stobbs
—	FW	FRA	Franck Betra

==== Out on loan ====
Note: Flags indicate national team as defined under FIFA eligibility rules; some limited exceptions apply. Players may hold more than one non-FIFA nationality.

No. / Pos. / Nation / Player; 23 / GK / ENG / Joe Wildsmith (on loan at Barnsley)	No. / Pos. / Nation / Player; 25 / DF / ENG / Matt Young (on loan at Carlisle United)

=== Academy ===
Note: Flags indicate national team as defined under FIFA eligibility rules; some limited exceptions apply. Players may hold more than one non-FIFA nationality.

No.	Pos.	Nation	Player
—	GK	ENG	Ben Jackson
—	GK	ENG	Brad McDonagh
—	DF	ENG	Spencer Brown
—	DF	ENG	Jack Lee
—	DF	ENG	Josh Murray
—	DF	ENG	Connor O'Grady
—	DF	ENG	Matt Penney
—	DF	ENG	Josh Stachini
—	MF	ENG	Warren Clarke
—	MF	ENG	Mason Duffy

No.	Pos.	Nation	Player
—	MF	ENG	Connor Kirby
—	MF	ENG	Jordan Lonchar
—	MF	ENG	Jake Nicholson
—	MF	SCO	Fraser Preston
—	MF	ENG	Lewis Price
—	FW	ENG	Joe Cook
—	FW	ENG	George Hirst
—	FW	ENG	Joe Nuttall
—	FW	ENG	Devante Rodney
—	FW	ENG	Freddy Tracey

=== Squad information ===
As of 2 April 2015

No	Pos	Nat	Name	Age	Joined	From	Contract Expires	Fee	League Appearances	Goals
1	GK	(Republic of Ireland)	Keiren Westwood	30	July 2014	(England) Sunderland	June 2016	Free	38	0
2	DF	(England)	Lewis Buxton	31	August 2008	(England) Stoke City	June 2015	£88,000	190	6
3	DF	(England)	Joe Mattock	24	July 2012	(England) West Bromwich Albion	June 2015	Free	55	2
4	MF	(England)	Sam Hutchinson	25	July 2014	(England) Chelsea	June 2016	Free	26	1
5	DF	(Netherlands)	Glenn Loovens	31	December 2013	Free Agent	June 2015	Free	48	0
6	MF	(Portugal)	José Semedo	30	July 2011	(England) Charlton Athletic	June 2015	Free	122	1
7	FW	(Scotland)	Stevie May	22	August 2014	(Scotland) St Johnstone	June 2018	Undisclosed	34	7
8	DF	(Scotland)	Liam Palmer	23	January 2013	(England) Sheffield Wednesday Academy	June 2018	Free	97	1
9	FW	(Austria)	Atdhe Nuhiu	25	July 2013	(Austria) Rapid Wien	June 2016	Free	76	15
10	MF	(Scotland)	Chris Maguire	26	July 2012	(England) Derby County	June 2015	Undisclosed	72	16
13	FW	(Northern Ireland)	Caolan Lavery	22	July 2012	(England) Ipswich Town	Unknown	Free	27	5
15	DF	(England)	Tom Lees	24	July 2014	(England) Leeds United	June 2017	Undisclosed	37	0
16	MF	(Scotland)	Rhys McCabe	22	July 2012	(Scotland) Rangers	June 2015	Free	30	1
17	DF	(France)	Jérémy Hélan	22	July 2013	(England) Manchester City	June 2017	Undisclosed	104	4
18	DF	(Guinea)	Kamil Zayatte	29	August 2013	(Turkey) İstanbul BB	June 2015	Free	18	2
19	MF	(Democratic Republic of the Congo)	Jacques Maghoma	27	July 2013	(England) Burton Albion	June 2015	Undisclosed	54	2
20	MF	(England)	Kieran Lee	26	July 2012	(England) Oldham Athletic	June 2015	Free	75	5
22	DF	(Portugal)	Rafael Floro	21	August 2013	(Portugal) Porto B	June 2015	Free	1	0
26	DF	(England)	William De Havilland	20	August 2014	(England) Millwall	June 2015	Free	0	0
27	MF	(Wales)	Lloyd Isgrove	22	March 2015	(England) Southampton	May 2015	Loan	1	0
28	FW	(Romania)	Sergiu Buș	22	February 2015	(Bulgaria) CSKA Sofia	June 2018	Undisclosed	2	0
30	GK	(England)	Cameron Dawson	19	April 2013	(England) Sheffield Wednesday Academy	June 2016	Free	0	0
33	MF	(Portugal)	Filipe Melo	25	February 2015	(Portugal) Moreirense	June 2018	Undisclosed	2	0
35	DF	(France)	Claude Dielna	27	August 2014	(Greece) Olympiacos	June 2017	Free	22	1
36	DF	(Belgium)	Marnick Vermijl	23	February 2015	(England) Manchester United	June 2018	Undisclosed	6	0
37	MF	(England)	Lewis McGugan	26	February 2015	(England) Watford	May 2015	Loan	18	3
43	GK	(England)	Chris Kirkland	33	July 2012	(England) Wigan Athletic	June 2015	Free	83	0
44	DF	(Slovenia)	Dejan Kelhar	30	August 2014	(Serbia) Red Star Belgrade	June 2015	Free	0	0
48	FW	(England)	Will Keane	22	January 2015	(England) Manchester United	May 2015	Loan	11	3

=== Transfers ===
==== In ====
Position	Player	Transferred from	Fee	Date	Ref
DF	(England) Matt Young	(England) Southampton	Free	3 June 2014	
DF	(England) Ed Sanders	(England) Stoke City	Free	3 June 2014	
MF	(England) Ryan Croasdale	(England) Preston North End	Free	9 June 2014	
MF	(Northern Ireland) Paul McElroy	(England) Hull City	Free	24 June 2014	
GK	(Republic of Ireland) Keiren Westwood	(England) Sunderland	Free	7 July 2014	
DF	(England) Sam Hutchinson	(England) Chelsea	Free	8 July 2014	
DF	(England) Tom Lees	(England) Leeds United	Undisclosed	31 July 2014	
DF	(Slovenia) Dejan Kelhar	(Serbia) Red Star Belgrade	Free	6 August 2014	
FW	(Scotland) Stevie May	(Scotland) St Johnstone	Undisclosed	9 August 2014	
DF	(England) William De Havilland	(England) Millwall	Free	25 August 2014	
DF	(France) Claude Dielna	(Greece) Olympiacos	Free	30 August 2014	
MF	(England) Ryan Meadows	(England) Wigan Athletic	Free	26 September 2014	
FW	(Romania) Sergiu Buș	(Bulgaria) CSKA Sofia	Undisclosed	2 February 2015	
DF	(Belgium) Marnick Vermijl	(England) Manchester United	Undisclosed	2 February 2015	
MF	(Portugal) Filipe Melo	(Portugal) Moreirense	Undisclosed	2 February 2015	

==== Out ====
Position	Player	Transferred to	Fee	Date	Ref
MF	(England) Danny Mayor	(England) Bury	Undisclosed	3 May 2014	
GK	(England) Adam Davies	(England) Barnsley	Free	6 May 2014	
GK	(England) Arron Jameson	(England) Buxton	Free	6 May 2014	
DF	(Benin) Réda Johnson	(England) Coventry City	Free	6 May 2014	
DF	(England) Anthony Gardner	Released	Free	6 May 2014	
DF	(Spain) Miguel Llera	(England) Scunthorpe United	Free	6 May 2014	
DF	(England) Martin Taylor	Released	Free	6 May 2014	
MF	(Jamaica) Jermaine Johnson	(United States) Indy Eleven	Free	6 May 2014	
MF	(England) David Prutton	Released	Free	6 May 2014	
DF	(England) Taylor McKenzie	(England) Notts County	Free	21 May 2014	
DF	(United States) Oguchi Onyewu	(England) Charlton Athletic	Free	30 June 2014	
MF	(Northern Ireland) Paul McElroy	(Northern Ireland) Linfield	Free	19 July 2014	
MF	(England) Michail Antonio	(England) Nottingham Forest	£1,500,000	6 August 2014	
FW	(England) Emmanuel Dieseruvwe	(England) Chesterfield	Undisclosed	2 February 2015	

==== Loans in ====
#	Position	Player	Transferred from	Length	Date	Ref
28	FW	(England) Hallam Hope	(England) Everton	6-months	29 August 2014 (Recalled 29 October 2014)	
11	MF	(Netherlands) Royston Drenthe	(England) Reading	6-months	1 September 2014	
12	FW	(England) Gary Taylor-Fletcher	(England) Leicester City	1-month	25 October 2014	
37	MF	(England) Lewis McGugan	(England) Watford	1-month	19 November 2014	
11	MF	(England) Lewis Baker	(England) Chelsea	4-months	8 January 2015 (Recalled 11 February 2015)	
48	FW	(England) Will Keane	(England) Manchester United	4-months	22 January 2015	
37	MF	(England) Lewis McGugan	(England) Watford	4-months	2 February 2015	
27	MF	(Wales) Lloyd Isgrove	(England) Southampton	2-months	18 March 2015	

==== Loans out ====
#	Position	Player	Loaned to	Length	Date	Ref
30	GK	(England) Cameron Dawson	(England) Alfreton Town	Three months	22 August 2014	
24	FW	(England) Gary Madine	(England) Coventry City	Three months	30 October 2014	
—	FW	(England) Emmanuel Dieseruvwe	(England) Chesterfield	1-month	3 January 2015	
25	DF	(England) Matt Young	(England) Carlisle United	Until end of season	10 January 2015	
13	MF	(Northern Ireland) Caolan Lavery	(England) Chesterfield	Until 15 March 2015	2 February 2015	
24	FW	(England) Gary Madine	(England) Blackpool	4-months	10 February 2015	
14	MF	(England) Giles Coke	(England) Bolton Wanderers	2-months	5 March 2015	
21	MF	(Republic of Ireland) Paul Corry	(England) Carlisle United	Until 2 May 2015	13 March 2015	
23	GK	(England) Joe Wildsmith	(England) Barnsley	1-month	25 April 2015	

=== Contracts ===
Position	Player	Length	Date	Expiry	Ref
MF	(Northern Ireland) Simon Hanna	1 year	12 May 2014	June 2015	
GK	(England) Chris Kirkland	1 year	8 July 2014	June 2015	
MF	(Portugal) José Semedo	1 year	10 July 2014	June 2015	
DF	(Netherlands) Glenn Loovens	1 year	14 July 2014	June 2015	
DF	(Slovenia) Dejan Kelhar	4 months	2 February 2015	June 2015	

=== Debuts ===
Players making their first team Sheffield Wednesday début in a competitive match.

#	Position	Player	Date	Opponents	Ground	Ref
1	GK	(Republic of Ireland) Keiren Westwood	9 August 2014	Brighton & Hove Albion	Falmer Stadium	
15	DF	(England) Tom Lees	9 August 2014	Brighton & Hove Albion	Falmer Stadium	
7	FW	(Scotland) Stevie May	16 August 2014	Derby County	Hillsborough	
28	FW	(England) Hallam Hope	30 August 2014	Nottingham Forest	Hillsborough	
11	MF	(Netherlands) Royston Drenthe	13 September 2014	Bolton Wanderers	Macron Stadium	
35	DF	(France) Claude Dielna	20 September 2014	Reading	Hillsborough	
12	FW	(England) Gary Taylor-Fletcher	25 October 2014	Norwich City	Hillsborough	
37	MF	(England) Lewis McGugan	22 November 2014	Huddersfield Town	The John Smith's Stadium	
11	MF	(England) Lewis Baker	10 January 2015	Nottingham Forest	City Ground	
48	FW	(England) Will Keane	27 January 2015	Birmingham City	Hillsborough	
36	DF	(Belgium) Marnick Vermijl	7 February 2015	Cardiff City	Hillsborough	
28	FW	(Romania) Sergiu Buș	7 February 2015	Cardiff City	Hillsborough	
33	MF	(Portugal) Filipe Melo	10 February 2015	Ipswich Town	Portman Road	

=== International call-ups ===
No	Pos	Name	Team	Competition	Opposition	Date	Caps	Goals	Ref
30	GK	(England) Cameron Dawson	England U-19	UEFA European 2014 Under-19 Championship Elite Qualifier	Montenegro U-19, Scotland U-19, Ukraine U-19	24–29 May 2014	4	0	
22	DF	(Portugal) Rafael Floro	Portugal U-20	2014 Toulon Tournament	Mexico U-20, Chile U-20, China PR U-20, France U-20, England U-20	21 May – 1 June 2014	4	0	
1	GK	(Republic of Ireland) Keiren Westwood	Republic of Ireland	Friendly, UEFA Euro 2016 Qualifier	Oman, (Georgia (country)) Georgia	3 September, 7 September 2014	17	0	
7	FW	(Scotland) Stevie May	Scotland U21	UEFA U21 Euro 2015 qualifier	Slovakia U21, Luxembourg U21	4 September, 8 September 2014	8	2	
18	DF	(Guinea) Kamil Zayatte	Guinea	2015 Africa Cup of Nations Qualifier	Togo, Uganda	6 September, 10 September 2014	46	4	
1	GK	(Republic of Ireland) Keiren Westwood	Republic of Ireland	UEFA Euro 2016 Qualifier	Gibraltar, Germany	11 October, 14 October 2014	17	0	
7	FW	(Scotland) Stevie May	Scotland	UEFA Euro 2016 Qualifier	(Georgia (country)) Georgia, Poland	11 October, 14 October 2014	0	0	
23	GK	(England) Joe Wildsmith	England U-20	Under-20 Four Nations Tournament	Germany U-20, Netherlands U-20, Turkey U-20	9 October, 11 October, 13 October 2014	0	0	
7	FW	(Scotland) Stevie May	Scotland	UEFA Euro 2016 Qualifier, Friendly	Republic of Ireland, England	14 November, 17 November 2014	1	0	
23	GK	(England) Joe Wildsmith	England U-20	Friendly	Canada U-20, Portugal U-20	12 November, 17 November 2014	0	0	
18	DF	(Guinea) Kamil Zayatte	Guinea	2015 Africa Cup of Nations	Ivory Coast, Cameroon, Mali, Ghana	20 January, 24 January, 28 January, 1 February 2015	46	4	
1	GK	(Republic of Ireland) Keiren Westwood	Republic of Ireland	UEFA Euro 2016 Qualifier	Poland	29 March 2015	17	0	
7	FW	(Scotland) Stevie May	Scotland	Friendly, UEFA Euro 2016 Qualifier	Northern Ireland, Gibraltar	25 March, 29 March 2015	1	0	
19	MF	(Democratic Republic of the Congo) Jacques Maghoma	(Democratic Republic of the Congo) DR Congo	Friendly	Iraq, Iraq	28 March, 30 March 2015	1	0	

== Fixtures and results ==
=== Pre-season ===
12 July 2014	York City	0–2	Sheffield Wednesday	Bootham Crescent
15:00		Report	Ilesanmi 27' (o.g.); Maguire 44'	Attendance: 3,312

18 July 2014	Bury	1–3	Sheffield Wednesday	AJ Bell Stadium
19:45	Nardiello 40'	Report	Maghoma 3'; Nuhiu 56'; Coke 80'

23 July 2014	FC Arsenal Tula	2–1	Sheffield Wednesday	Ptuj City Stadium
17:00	Bazanov 8'; Kutyin (yellow card) 53'; Ryzhkov 85'	Report	Antonio 3'; Mattock (yellow card); Maguire (yellow card); Kelhar (yellow card)

27 July 2014	Doncaster Rovers	2–2	Sheffield Wednesday	Keepmoat Stadium
15:00	de Val 50'; Bennett 65'	Report	Nuhiu 42'; Antonio 47'

30 July 2014	Sheffield Wednesday	0–1	Newcastle United	Hillsborough
19:45		Report	Pérez 65'	Attendance: 10,173; Referee: Michael Naylor

2 August 2014	Barnsley	1–1	Sheffield Wednesday	Oakwell
13:00	Rose 30'	Report	Lee 49'	Attendance: 5,193; Referee: Robert Madley

=== Football League Championship ===
9 August 2014 1	Brighton & Hove Albion	0–1	Sheffield Wednesday	Falmer Stadium
15:00	Forster-Caskey (yellow card) 10'; Crofts (red card) 50'; Bruno (yellow card) 74'; LuaLua (yellow card) 82'	Report	Coke 41'; Loovens (yellow card) 55'	Attendance: 26,993; Referee: James Linington

16 August 2014 2	Sheffield Wednesday	0–0	Derby County	Hillsborough
15:00	Keogh (yellow card) 48'; Bryson (yellow card) 61'	Report	Hutchinson (yellow card) 37'; Loovens (yellow card) 44'; Mattock (yellow card) 77'	Attendance: 25,186; Referee: Scott Duncan

19 August 2014 3	Sheffield Wednesday	1–1	Millwall	Hillsborough
19:45	Maguire 57'; Westwood (yellow card) 84'; Loovens (yellow card) 90+2'	Report	Williams (penalty missed) 85'; Fuller (yellow card) 90+2'; Gueye 90+5'	Attendance: 20,636; Referee: Nigel Miller

23 August 2014 4	Middlesbrough	2–3	Sheffield Wednesday	Riverside Stadium
15:00	Leadbitter (yellow card) 41' (goal) 72' (pen.) 90+1' (pen.); Abella (yellow card) 45+2'; Ayala (yellow card) 86'	Report	Nuhiu 6' 57'; Maguire (yellow card) 36'; May 42'; Semedo (yellow card) 81'; Loovens (yellow card) 90+1'	Attendance: 17,820; Referee: Phil Dowd

30 August 2014 5	Sheffield Wednesday	0–1	Nottingham Forest	Hillsborough
12:15	Semedo (yellow card) 21'; Loovens (yellow card) 31'; Mattock (yellow card) 34'; Palmer (yellow card) 53'	Report	Antonio (yellow card) 29'; Lansbury 37'; Burke (yellow card) 90+1'; Assombalonga (yellow card) 90+5'	Attendance: 20,656; Referee: Graham Salisbury

13 September 2014 6	Bolton Wanderers	0–0	Sheffield Wednesday	Macron Stadium
15:00	Moxey (yellow card) 34'; Mills (yellow card) 88'	Report		Attendance: 15,799; Referee: Andy Haines

16 September 2014 7	Birmingham City	0–2	Sheffield Wednesday	St Andrew's
19:45	Edgar (yellow card) 41'; Robinson (yellow card) 59'	Report	May 67'; Nuhiu (yellow card) 62'; Hélan 89'	Attendance: 14,085; Referee: James Adcock

20 September 2014 8	Sheffield Wednesday	1–0	Reading	Hillsborough
15:00	Coke (yellow card) 31'; Palmer (yellow card) 39'; Maguire (yellow card) 66'; May 83'	Report	Murray (penalty missed) 32'; Blackman (yellow card) 38'; Akpan (yellow card) 63'; Cooper (yellow card) 82'	Attendance: 29,848; Referee: Mark Heywood

27 September 2014 9	Cardiff City	2–1	Sheffield Wednesday	Cardiff City Stadium
15:00	Morrison 39'; Pilkington 61'	Report	Mattock (yellow card) 38'; Morrison 51' (o.g.); Loovens (yellow card) 84'	Attendance: 20,901; Referee: Michael Bull

30 September 2014 10	Sheffield Wednesday	1–1	Ipswich Town	Hillsborough
19:45	Nuhiu 5'; Maguire (yellow card) 68'; Mattock (yellow card) 90'	Report	Williams 62'	Attendance: 18,093; Referee: Darren Bond

4 October 2014 11	Leeds United	1–1	Sheffield Wednesday	Elland Road
12:15	Berardi (yellow card) 66'; Bellusci (yellow card) 67' (goal) 79'; Byram (yellow card) 71'	Report	Nuhiu (yellow card) 41'; Maguire 52' (yellow card) 66'; Lee (yellow card) 72'; Semedo (yellow card) 78'	Attendance: 24,094; Referee: James Adcock

18 October 2014 12	Sheffield Wednesday	0–3	Watford	Hillsborough
15:00	Drenthe (yellow card) 88'	Report	Ighalo 21'; Abdi 38'; Ekstrand (yellow card) 44'; Pudil (yellow card) 55'; Vydra 69'	Attendance: 20,909; Referee: Jeremy Simpson

21 October 2014 13	Brentford	0–0	Sheffield Wednesday	Griffin Park
19:45	McCormack (yellow card) 67'	Report	Mattock (yellow card) 70'; May (yellow card) 84'	Attendance: 10,826; Referee: Oliver Langford

25 October 2014 14	Sheffield Wednesday	0–0	Norwich City	Hillsborough
15:00	Maguire (yellow card) 42'; Hélan (yellow card) 45+3'; Lee (yellow card) 83'; Semedo (yellow card) 90'	Report	Johnson (yellow card) 30'; Turner (yellow card) 50'; Tettey (yellow card) 90+4'	Attendance: 20,898; Referee: Stuart Attwell

1 November 2014 15	Charlton Athletic	1–1	Sheffield Wednesday	The Valley
15:00	Vetokele 70'	Report	Drenthe 27'	Attendance: 16,850; Referee: Andy D'Urso

4 November 2014 16	Sheffield Wednesday	0–2	Bournemouth	Hillsborough
19:45	Drenthe (yellow card) 27' (red card) 60'; Maguire (yellow card) 66'	Report	Surman 65'; Fraser 69'	Attendance: 16,881; Referee: Mike Dean

8 November 2014 17	Sheffield Wednesday	0–0	Rotherham United	Hillsborough
15:00		Report	Broadfoot (yellow card) 5'	Attendance: 26,986; Referee: Nigel Miller

22 November 2014 18	Huddersfield Town	0–0	Sheffield Wednesday	The John Smith's Stadium
15:00	Poyet (yellow card) 83'	Report	Drenthe (yellow card) 20'; May (yellow card) 64'; Loovens (yellow card) 80'; Maguire (yellow card) 85'	Attendance: 14,389; Referee: Graham Salisbury

29 November 2014 19	Sheffield Wednesday	2–1	Wigan Athletic	Hillsborough
15:00	May 27' 71'; Loovens (yellow card) 45'; Semedo (yellow card) 52'; Palmer (yellow card) 90+3'	Report	McCann 26'; Ramis (yellow card) 43'; Barnett (yellow card) 62'	Attendance: 20,609; Referee: Chris Kavanagh

6 December 2014 20	Blackburn Rovers	1–2	Sheffield Wednesday	Ewood Park
15:00	Baptiste 16'	Report	Lee 3'; Dielna 90+3' (yellow card) 90+4'	Attendance: 14,920; Referee: Stephen Martin

13 December 2014 21	Sheffield Wednesday	0–1	Wolverhampton Wanderers	Hillsborough
15:00	Nuhiu (yellow card) 49'; Lee (yellow card) 79'	Report	Clarke 84'	Attendance: 20,598; Referee: Stuart Attwell

20 December 2014 22	Fulham	4–0	Sheffield Wednesday	Craven Cottage
15:00	Stafylidis (yellow card) 28'; McCormack 34'; Hutchinson 45'; Fofana (yellow card) 55'; Christensen 67'; Woodrow 90+3' (pen.)	Report	Loovens (yellow card) 34'; Hélan (yellow card) 45'; Semedo (yellow card) 51'	Attendance: 21,123; Referee: Mike Jones

26 December 2014 23	Sheffield Wednesday	1–0	Blackpool	Hillsborough
15:00	Maguire 39' (pen.)	Report	Clarke (yellow card) 26'; McMahon (yellow card) 35'; Miller (yellow card) 59' (red card) 90+5'	Attendance: 26,609; Referee: James Adcock

30 December 2014 24	Wigan Athletic	0–1	Sheffield Wednesday	DW Stadium
19:45	Kiernan (yellow card) 25'; McManaman (red card) 68'	Report	Semedo (yellow card) 72'; Nuhiu 77' (yellow card) 90+3'; Maguire (yellow card) 84'	Attendance: 14,571; Referee: Dean Whitestone

10 January 2015 25	Nottingham Forest	0–2	Sheffield Wednesday	City Ground
15:00	Vaughan (yellow card) 89'	Report	Lee 45'; Maguire 50'	Attendance: 22,209; Referee: Andy D'Urso

17 January 2015 26	Sheffield Wednesday	1–2	Bolton Wanderers	Hillsborough
15:00	Maguire 28' (pen.); Maghoma (yellow card) 61'; Lee (yellow card) 68'; Hutchinson (yellow card) 73' (red card) 83'; Westwood (yellow card) 80'	Report	Feeney 2'; Pratley 25' (yellow card) 35'; Vela (yellow card) 90+2'	Attendance: 22,617; Referee: Graham Scott

27 January 2015 27	Sheffield Wednesday	0–0	Birmingham City	Hillsborough
19:45	Nuhiu (yellow card) 90+1'	Report	Grounds (yellow card) 68'; Cotterill (yellow card) 90'	Attendance: 18,385; Referee: Trevor Kettle

31 January 2015 28	Reading	2–0	Sheffield Wednesday	Madejski Stadium
15:00	Pogrebnyak 29'; Chalobah 40'; Robson-Kanu (penalty missed) 63'; Hector (yellow card) 67'	Report	Loovens (yellow card) 34'	Attendance: 17,755; Referee: Brendan Malone

7 February 2015 29	Sheffield Wednesday	1–1	Cardiff City	Hillsborough
15:00	Maguire (yellow card) 27'; Keane 75' (pen.); Hutchinson (yellow card) 90+1'	Report	Jones 7' (yellow card) 90+1'; Whittingham (yellow card) 37'; Doyle (yellow card) 60'; Revell (yellow card) 85'; Gunnarsson (yellow card) 90+5'	Attendance: 22,344; Referee: Kevin Wright

10 February 2015 30	Ipswich Town	2–1	Sheffield Wednesday	Portman Road
19:45	Murphy 52'; Chambers 67'	Report	Lee 20'; Hutchinson (yellow card) 35'	Attendance: 17,306; Referee: Stuart Attwell

14 February 2015 31	Sheffield Wednesday	0–0	Brighton & Hove Albion	Hillsborough
15:00	Semedo (yellow card) 22'; Hutchinson (yellow card) 40'		Kayal (yellow card) 18'; Bruno (yellow card) 43'; Teixeira (yellow card) 90+4'	Attendance: 19,274; Referee: Scott Duncan

21 February 2015 32	Derby County	3–2	Sheffield Wednesday	iPro Stadium
15:00	Buxton 47' 68'; Bent 77' (pen.); Hughes (yellow card) 90+1'	Report	McGugan 20'; Hutchinson (yellow card) 50'; Keane 55'; Westwood (red card) 75'; Lee (yellow card) 79'; Nuhiu (yellow card) 86'	Attendance: 31,628; Referee: Darren Bond

24 February 2015 33	Millwall	1–3	Sheffield Wednesday	The Den
19:45	Fabbrini 90'	Report	Zayatte (yellow card) 18'; McGugan 52'; Nuhiu 72'; May 83'; Dielna (yellow card) 90+4'	Attendance: 8,568; Referee: James Linington

28 February 2015 34	Sheffield Wednesday	2–0	Middlesbrough	Hillsborough
15:00	Nuhiu 52' (pen.); Keane 54'; Semedo (yellow card) 66'; Dielna (yellow card) 90'	Report	Tomlin (yellow card) 66'	Attendance: 23,744; Referee: Stephen Martin

4 March 2015 35	Sheffield Wednesday	1–2	Blackburn Rovers	Hillsborough
19:45	Maguire 61'	Report	Rhodes 17'; Henley 26' (yellow card) 49'; Brown (yellow card) 57'; Spurr (yellow card) 60'	Attendance: 19,593; Referee: Eddie Ilderton

7 March 2015 36	Blackpool	0–1	Sheffield Wednesday	Bloomfield Road
15:00	Barkhuizen (yellow card) 53'; Telford (yellow card) 70'; Clarke (yellow card) 77'	Report	Lees (yellow card) 15'; McGugan 54'; Dielna (yellow card) 70'; Hélan (yellow card) 80'	Attendance: 11,887; Referee: Graham Scott

14 March 2015 37	Sheffield Wednesday	1–1	Fulham	Hillsborough
15:00	May 55'; Vermijl (yellow card) 58'; Lee (yellow card) 64'	Report	Smith 75'; Turner (yellow card) 78'	Attendance: 22,182; Referee: Andy Woolmer

17 March 2015 38	Wolverhampton Wanderers	3–0	Sheffield Wednesday	Molineux Stadium
19:45	Sako 18' (pen.); Afobe 55'; Henry 67'	Report	Dielna (yellow card) 18'; McGugan (yellow card) 86'	Attendance: 18,687; Referee: Simon Hooper

21 March 2015 39	Rotherham United	2–3	Sheffield Wednesday	New York Stadium
15:00	Pringle 57'; Morgan (yellow card) 75'; Bowery 87'; Hunt (yellow card) 90+3'	Report	Mattock (yellow card) 20'; Hutchinson (yellow card) 44'; Lavery 86'; Nuhiu 90+3'; Lee 90+8'	Attendance: 11,707; Referee: Oliver Langford

4 April 2015 40	Sheffield Wednesday	1–1	Huddersfield Town	Hillsborough
15:00	Buș 86'	Report	Coady (yellow card) 45'; Lynch (yellow card) 67'; Hudson (yellow card) 81'; Miller 89'	Attendance: 20,851; Referee: Mark Haywood

6 April 2015 41	Norwich	2–0	Sheffield Wednesday	Carrow Road
15:00	Tettey (yellow card) 17'; Johnson 33', 45', (yellow card) 55'; Martin (yellow card) 52'	Report	Melo (yellow card) 6'; McGugan (yellow card) 22'	Attendance: 26,993; Referee: Carl Boyeson

11 April 2015 42	Sheffield Wednesday	1–1	Charlton Athletic	Hillsborough
15:00	Lavery 41'; Hutchinson (yellow card) 52'; Hélan (yellow card) 60'	Report	Berg Guðmundsson 75'; Solly (yellow card) 85'; Buyens (yellow card) 90'	Attendance: 23,257; Referee: Darren Bond

14 April 2015 43	Sheffield Wednesday	1–0	Brentford	Hillsborough
19:45	Lee 75'; Maguire (yellow card) 90'	Report	Douglas (yellow card) 90'	Attendance: 17,416; Referee: Mark Brown

18 April 2015 44	Bournemouth	2–2	Sheffield Wednesday	Goldsands Stadium
15:00	Cook 31'; Kermorgant 69'; Francis (yellow card) 58' (yellow-red card) 78'; Ritchie 84'	Report	Isgrove (yellow card) 2'; Lee 36'; Hélan (yellow card) 61'; Maguire 90' (pen.)	Attendance: 11,280; Referee: Paul Tierney

25 April 2015 45	Sheffield Wednesday	1–2	Leeds United	Hillsborough
12:30	Hélan (yellow card) 14'; Maguire 36' (pen.); Semedo (yellow card) 60'	Report	Bamba (yellow card) 35'; Taylor 57'; Murphy (yellow card) 69'; Morison 72'	Attendance: 28,227; Referee: Bobby Madley

2 May 2015 46	Watford	1–1	Sheffield Wednesday	Vicarage Road
12:30	Vydra 25'	Report	Semedo (yellow card) 73'; Nuhiu 90'	Attendance: 20,250; Referee: Lee Probert

Last updated: 2 May 2015

=== League Cup ===
12 August 2014 Round 1	Sheffield Wednesday	3–0	Notts County	Hillsborough
19:45	Maghoma 2'; Madine 10'; Nuhiu 65'	Report	Hollis (yellow card) 84'; Adams (yellow card) 90+1'	Attendance: 12,851; Referee: Eddie Ilderton

26 August 2014 Round 2	Burnley	0–1	Sheffield Wednesday	Turf Moor
19:45		Report	Maguire (yellow card) 43'; Coke (yellow card) 71'; Nuhiu 78' (pen.)	Attendance: 4,979; Referee: Geoff Eltringham

23 September 2014 Round 3	Manchester City	7–0	Sheffield Wednesday	Etihad Stadium
19:45	Lampard 47' 90+3'; Džeko 53' 77'; Navas 54'; Touré 60' (pen.); Mangala (yellow card) 63'; Pozo 88'	Report	Zayatte (red card) 59'	Attendance: 32,346; Referee: Paul Tierney

=== FA Cup ===
4 January 2015 Round 3	Manchester City	2–1	Sheffield Wednesday	Etihad Stadium
15:00	Milner 66' 90+1'	Report	Nuhiu 14'; Palmer (yellow card) 45+1'	Attendance: 44,309; Referee: Michael Oliver

== Squad statistics ==
=== Appearances and goals ===
As of 2 April 2015

No.	Pos	Nat	Player	Total		Championship		FA Cup		League Cup	
No.	Pos	Nat	Player	Apps	Goals	Apps	Goals	Apps	Goals	Apps	Goals
1	GK	(Republic of Ireland) IRL	Keiren Westwood	38	0	38+0	0	0+0	0	0+0	0
2	DF	(England) ENG	Lewis Buxton	4	0	2+1	0	0+0	0	1+0	0
3	DF	(England) ENG	Joe Mattock	28	0	22+3	0	0+0	0	3+0	0
4	MF	(England) ENG	Sam Hutchinson	16	0	12+4	0	0+0	0	0+0	0
5	DF	(Netherlands) NED	Glenn Loovens	28	0	26+0	0	1+0	0	1+0	0
6	MF	(Portugal) POR	José Semedo	31	0	25+3	0	1+0	0	2+0	0
7	FW	(Scotland) SCO	Stevie May	37	7	25+9	7	1+0	0	1+1	0
8	MF	(Scotland) SCO	Liam Palmer	39	0	35+0	0	1+0	0	3+0	0
9	FW	(Austria) AUT	Atdhe Nuhiu	42	10	30+8	7	1+0	1	1+2	2
10	MF	(Scotland) SCO	Chris Maguire	39	6	31+4	6	0+1	0	3+0	0
13	FW	(Northern Ireland) NIR	Caolan Lavery	7	1	0+6	1	0+1	0	0+0	0
15	DF	(England) ENG	Tom Lees	41	0	37+0	0	1+0	0	3+0	0
16	MF	(Scotland) SCO	Rhys McCabe	3	0	0+1	0	0+1	0	0+1	0
17	MF	(France) FRA	Jérémy Hélan	36	1	20+13	1	1+0	0	1+1	0
18	DF	(Guinea) GUI	Kamil Zayatte	10	0	7+0	0	0+0	0	2+1	0
19	MF	(Democratic Republic of the Congo) COD	Jacques Maghoma	33	1	27+2	0	1+0	0	3+0	1
20	MF	(England) ENG	Kieran Lee	26	4	21+4	4	1+0	0	0+0	0
22	DF	(Portugal) POR	Rafael Floro	0	0	0+0	0	0+0	0	0+0	0
26	DF	(England) ENG	William De Havilland	0	0	0+0	0	0+0	0	0+0	0
27	MF	(Wales) WAL	Lloyd Isgrove	1	0	1+0	0	0+0	0	0+0	0
28	FW	(Romania) ROU	Sergiu Buș	2	0	1+1	0	0+0	0	0+0	0
30	GK	(England) ENG	Cameron Dawson	0	0	0+0	0	0+0	0	0+0	0
33	MF	(Portugal) POR	Filipe Melo	2	0	0+2	0	0+0	0	0+0	0
35	DF	(France) FRA	Claude Dielna	24	1	13+9	1	1+0	0	0+1	0
36	DF	(Belgium) BEL	Marnick Vermijl	6	0	4+2	0	0+0	0	0+0	0
37	MF	(England) ENG	Lewis McGugan	18	3	17+1	3	0+0	0	0+0	0
43	GK	(England) ENG	Chris Kirkland	6	0	1+1	0	1+0	0	3+0	0
44	DF	(Slovenia) SLO	Dejan Kelhar	0	0	0+0	0	0+0	0	0+0	0
48	FW	(England) ENG	Will Keane	11	3	11+0	3	0+0	0	0+0	0
Players for Sheffield Wednesday who are currently out on loan:
14	MF	(England) ENG	Giles Coke	16	1	9+4	1	0+0	0	3+0	0
21	MF	(Republic of Ireland) IRL	Paul Corry	1	0	0+0	0	0+0	0	0+1	0
23	GK	(England) ENG	Joe Wildsmith	0	0	0+0	0	0+0	0	0+0	0
24	FW	(England) ENG	Gary Madine	13	1	1+9	0	0+0	0	3+0	1
25	DF	(England) ENG	Matt Young	0	0	0+0	0	0+0	0	0+0	0
Sheffield Wednesday players from this season that are no longer at the club:
11	MF	(Netherlands) NED	Royston Drenthe	15	1	7+8	1	0+0	0	0+0	0
12	FW	(England) ENG	Gary Taylor-Fletcher	4	0	2+2	0	0+0	0	0+0	0
28	FW	(England) ENG	Hallam Hope	4	0	1+3	0	0+0	0	0+0	0

=== Top goal scorers ===
As of 2 May 2015

Place	Position	Nation	Number	Name	Championship	FA Cup	League Cup	Total
1	FW	(Austria)	9	Atdhe Nuhiu	8	1	2	11
2	MF	(Scotland)	10	Chris Maguire	8	0	0	8
3	FW	(Scotland)	7	Stevie May	7	0	0	7
4	MF	(England)	20	Kieran Lee	6	0	0	6
=	FW	(England)	48	Will Keane	3	0	0	3
=	MF	(England)	37	Lewis McGugan	3	0	0	3
7	FW	(Northern Ireland)	13	Caolan Lavery	2	0	0	2
8	MF	(England)	14	Giles Coke	1	0	0	1
9	MF	(France)	17	Jérémy Hélan	1	0	0	1
=	MF	(Netherlands)	11	Royston Drenthe	1	0	0	1
=	DF	(France)	35	Claude Dielna	1	0	0	1
=	MF	(Democratic Republic of the Congo)	19	Jacques Maghoma	0	0	1	1
=	FW	(England)	24	Gary Madine	0	0	1	1
=	FW	(Romania)	28	Sergiu Buș	1	0	0	1

=== Disciplinary record ===
As of 2 May 2015

Place	No.	Nation	Position	Name	Championship		FA Cup		League Cup		Total	
Place	No.	Nation	Position	Name	Yellow card	Red card	Yellow card	Red card	Yellow card	Red card	Yellow card	Red card
1	10	(Scotland)	MF	Chris Maguire	10	0	0	0	1	0	11	0
=	6	(Portugal)	MF	José Semedo	11	0	0	0	0	0	11	0
3	4	(England)	MF	Sam Hutchinson	8	1	0	0	0	0	8	1
=	5	(Netherlands)	DF	Glenn Loovens	10	0	0	0	0	0	10	0
5	11	(Netherlands)	MF	Royston Drenthe	2	1	0	0	0	0	2	1
=	1	(Republic of Ireland)	GK	Keiren Westwood	2	1	0	0	0	0	2	1
7	18	(Guinea)	DF	Kamil Zayatte	1	0	0	0	0	1	1	1
8	9	(Austria)	FW	Atdhe Nuhiu	6	0	0	0	0	0	6	0
=	3	(England)	DF	Joe Mattock	6	0	0	0	0	0	6	0
=	17	(France)	MF	Jérémy Hélan	6	0	0	0	0	0	6	0
11	20	(England)	MF	Kieran Lee	5	0	0	0	0	0	5	0
=	35	(France)	DF	Claude Dielna	5	0	0	0	0	0	5	0
13	8	(Scotland)	DF	Liam Palmer	3	0	1	0	0	0	4	0
14	37	(England)	MF	Lewis McGugan	2	0	0	0	1	0	3	0
15	7	(Scotland)	FW	Stevie May	2	0	0	0	0	0	2	0
=	19	(Democratic Republic of the Congo)	MF	Jacques Maghoma	2	0	0	0	0	0	2	0
=	14	(England)	MF	Giles Coke	1	0	0	0	1	0	2	0
18	33	(Portugal)	MF	Felipe Melo	1	0	0	0	0	0	1	0
=	27	(Wales)	MF	Lloyd Isgrove	1	0	0	0	0	0	1	0

== Competitions ==
=== Overall ===
Competition	Started Round	Current Pos/Round	Final Pos/Round	First Match	Last Match
Championship	N/A	12th		9 August 2014	2 May 2015
FA Cup	Round 3	Round 3	Round 3	4 January 2015	4 January 2015
League Cup	Round 1	Round 3	Round 3	12 August 2014	24 September 2014

=== Championship ===
==== Classification ====
Pos	Team	Pld	W	D	L	GF	GA	GD	Pts
11	Cardiff City	46	16	14	16	57	61	−4	62
12	Charlton Athletic	46	14	18	14	54	60	−6	60
13	Sheffield Wednesday	46	14	18	14	43	49	−6	60
14	Nottingham Forest	46	15	14	17	71	69	+2	59
15	Leeds United	46	15	11	20	50	61	−11	56

Updated to match(es) played on 2 May 2015. Source: Sky Sports
Rules for classification: 1) Points; 2) Goal difference; 3) Number of goals scored

==== Results summary ====
Overall								Home						Away					
Pld	W	D	L	GF	GA	GD	Pts	W	D	L	GF	GA	GD	W	D	L	GF	GA	GD
46	14	18	14	43	49	−6	60	5	11	7	16	20	−4	9	7	7	27	29	−2

Last updated: 2 May 2015.
Source: Championship

==== Results by round ====
Round	1	2	3	4	5	6	7	8	9	10	11	12	13	14	15	16	17	18	19	20	21	22	23	24	25	26	27	28	29	30	31	32	33	34	35	36	37	38	39	40	41	42	43	44	45	46
Ground	A	H	H	A	H	A	A	H	A	H	A	H	A	H	A	H	H	A	H	A	H	A	H	A	A	H	H	A	H	A	H	A	A	H	H	A	H	A	A	H	A	H	H	A	H	A
Result	W	D	D	W	L	D	W	W	L	D	D	L	D	D	D	L	D	D	W	W	L	L	W	W	W	L	D	L	D	L	D	L	W	W	L	W	D	L	W	D	L	D	W	D	L	D
Position	8	9	10	6	10	12	8	6	9	9	9	11	13	12	13	14	13	13	13	12	13	14	13	10	9	9	9	10	10	11	11	12	11	10	11	10	11	12	12	12	12	13	11	12	14	13

Updated to match(es) played on 2 May 2015. Source: BBC Sport
A = Away; H = Home; W = Win; D = Draw; L = Loss

== Awards ==
=== Sheffield Wednesday Player of the Month ===
Month	First	%	Second	%	Third	%	Ref
August	(Austria) Atdhe Nuhiu	53%	(England) Tom Lees	23%	(Republic of Ireland) Keiren Westwood	9%	
September	(Republic of Ireland) Keiren Westwood	45%	(England) Tom Lees	20%	(Scotland) Stevie May	17%	
October	(Republic of Ireland) Keiren Westwood	88%	——————————	——	——————————	——	
November	(England) Tom Lees	33%	(Republic of Ireland) Keiren Westwood	32%	(France) Jérémy Hélan	16%	
December	(Republic of Ireland) Keiren Westwood	45%	(France) Jérémy Hélan	18%	(England) Tom Lees	8%	
January	(Portugal) José Semedo	41%	(Republic of Ireland) Keiren Westwood	34%	(England) Tom Lees	9%	
February	(England) Lewis McGugan	62%	(Portugal) José Semedo	12%	(England) Kieran Lee	5%	
March	(England) Lewis McGugan	78%	(Republic of Ireland) Keiren Westwood	7%	(England) Kieran Lee	6%	

=== Sky Bet Football League Team of the Week ===
Week	Player(s)	Ref
11 August – 17 August	(England) Giles Coke	
22 September – 28 September	(Republic of Ireland) Keiren Westwood	
27 October – 2 November	(Republic of Ireland) Keiren Westwood	
8 December – 14 December	(France) Claude Dielna	
12 January – 18 January	(Netherlands) Glenn Loovens	
