= Chris Kirkland =

English footballer (born 1981)

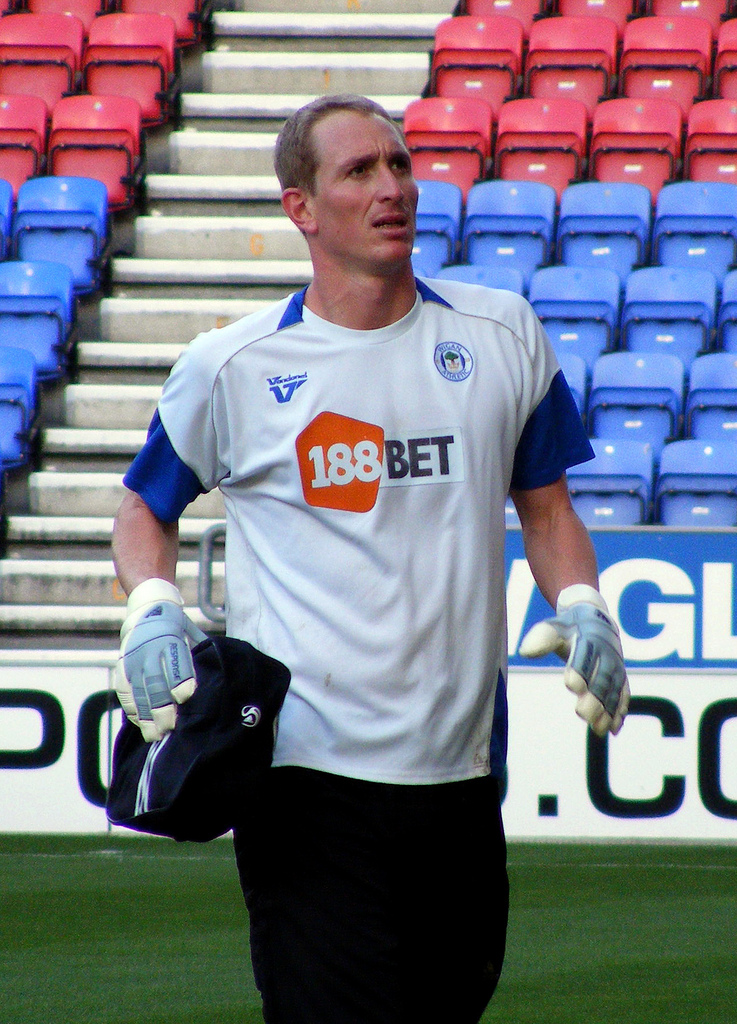
- Kirkland warming up with Wigan Athletic in 2010

Personal information
- Full name: Christopher Edmund Kirkland
- Date of birth: 2 May 1981 (age 45)
- Place of birth: Barwell, Leicestershire, England
- Height: 6 ft 6 in (1.98 m)
- Position: Goalkeeper

Youth career
- –1998: Coventry City

Senior career*
| Years | Team | Apps | (Gls) |
| 1998–2001 | Coventry City | 24 | (0) |
| 2001–2006 | Liverpool | 25 | (0) |
| 2005–2006 | → West Bromwich Albion (loan) | 10 | (0) |
| 2006 | → Wigan Athletic (loan) | 9 | (0) |
| 2006–2012 | Wigan Athletic | 122 | (0) |
| 2010 | → Leicester City (loan) | 3 | (0) |
| 2011 | → Doncaster Rovers (loan) | 1 | (0) |
| 2012–2015 | Sheffield Wednesday | 85 | (0) |
| 2015–2016 | Preston North End | 5 | (0) |
| 2016 | Bury | 0 | (0) |
| Total | | 284 | (0) |

International career
| 2001–2003 | England U21 | 8 | (0) |
| 2006 | England | 1 | (0) |

Managerial career
- 2018: Liverpool Women (caretaker)
- * Club domestic league appearances and goals

Christopher Edmund Kirkland (born 2 May 1981) is an English football coach and former professional goalkeeper. As a player, he made 321 league and cup appearances in an 18-year professional career from 1998 to 2016 and won one cap for the England national team in 2006.

Kirkland started his career at Coventry City, where he was regarded as one of the country's most promising young goalkeepers. He was later signed by Premier League club Liverpool for £6 million in August 2001. His time at the club was blighted by recurring injuries, which almost caused him to retire from football altogether. He later signed for Wigan Athletic in July 2006, after a successful loan period. He had further loan spells at both Leicester City and Doncaster Rovers before being signed by Sheffield Wednesday in May 2012. He joined Preston North End in August 2015 and had a brief spell with Bury before retiring in August 2016.

A year after retiring from playing, Kirkland took up coaching with Port Vale in January 2017. He subsequently joined the coaching staff of Liverpool Women the following year and was briefly manager for a month and a half.

== Club career ==
=== Coventry City ===
Kirkland was born in Barwell, Leicestershire, where he grew up with his parents, Marie and Eddie, and attended Heathfield School and then Henley College Coventry. His father, Eddie, was a crane driver and spent many hours helping his son practise his goalkeeping skills. After an unsuccessful trial with Blackburn Rovers, he accepted a contract offer from Coventry City. He signed professional terms with the club in July 1998.

Kirkland made his debut for Coventry in the League Cup in a 3–1 victory over Tranmere Rovers at Highfield Road on 22 September 1999. Manager Gordon Strachan began selecting him in Premier League matches ahead of Swedish international Magnus Hedman despite saying Kirkland was "big Bambi who couldn't kick the ball out of the penalty box". His performances were rewarded at the end of the 2000–01 season when he made his debut for the England under-21s, and was voted Coventry's Players' Player of the Year by his teammates. He was linked with moves to Arsenal and Liverpool, despite his relatively limited experience and was eventually bought by Liverpool for £6 million in August 2001. At the time he was the most expensive goalkeeper in British transfer history, at only 20 years old.

=== Liverpool ===
Kirkland made his debut for Liverpool in October 2001, but mostly served as understudy to first-choice goalkeeper Jerzy Dudek during the 2001–02 season. He was an unused substitute in the 2002 FA Community Shield at the Millennium Stadium, where Liverpool were beaten 1–0 by Arsenal. During the 2002–03 season, costly errors by Dudek in a league fixture against Manchester United resulted in manager Gérard Houllier handing the first-team place to Kirkland in December. He played 14 consecutive matches, during which he kept six clean sheets, but sustained an ankle injury in January 2003, which ruled him out for the rest of the season, meaning he missed the victorious 2003 League Cup final. He spent six weeks out of action after tearing his groin whilst on England under-21 duty in September 2003. He fractured a finger in December 2003, and was ruled out of action for four months after undergoing surgery to repair it.

Kirkland ousted Dudek as first-choice Liverpool keeper at the beginning of the 2004–05 season and played 14 matches before he was again sidelined in December after succumbing to a long-standing back injury. He had played four Champions League matches but was unable to be named in the squad for the 2005 final due to injury; Scott Carson, who took his place on the bench in Istanbul, later offered his Champions League winners medal to Kirkland, who refused to accept it.

In July 2005, Kirkland agreed to go on a season-long loan to Bryan Robson's West Bromwich Albion to kick-start his career again. He kept a clean sheet on his Albion debut as the team drew 0–0 away at Manchester City. An injury to Kirkland in the first half of the 2005–06 season saw Polish goalkeeper Tomasz Kuszczak replace him. Kuszczak showed excellent form and therefore remained first-choice goalkeeper at The Hawthorns for the rest of the season. Kirkland also again spent time out of action with a broken finger, and was told by Liverpool manager Rafael Benítez that he would have to move away from Anfield if he wanted to play regular first-team football as new signing Pepe Reina had made an excellent start to his Liverpool career.

=== Wigan Athletic ===
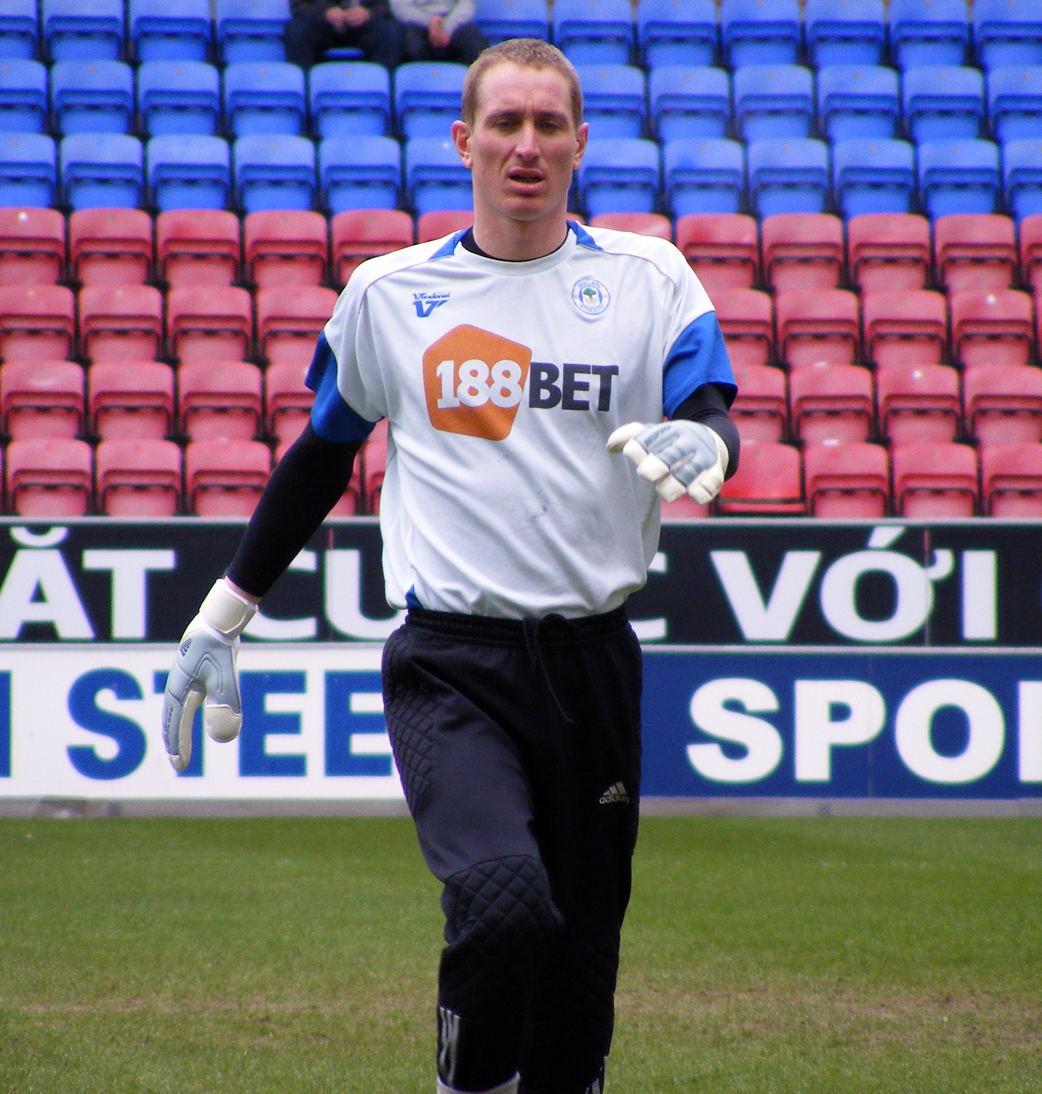
Kirkland warming up with Wigan Athletic in 2010

In July 2006, Kirkland joined Wigan Athletic on a six-month loan spell. Manager Paul Jewell said that "He certainly has the potential, but there's the obvious question mark over fitness. It's not just been one thing with him because he's been unlucky with broken ribs, fingers, knee injuries, back." This move became permanent for a sum of £2.5 million on 27 October when the two clubs and Kirkland made a compromise. He won the club's Players' Player of the Year and Media Player of the Year awards for the 2007–08 season. A highlight of this season was saving a Benni McCarthy penalty in a 5–3 win over Blackburn Rovers at the DW Stadium. He committed his future to Wigan in May 2008 when he signed a new contract, tying him to the club until 2012.

On 22 November 2009, Kirkland conceded nine goals in a Premier League match against Tottenham Hotspur. Sunderland manager Steve Bruce – Kirkland's former manager at Wigan from November 2007 to June 2009 – was linked with a move for Kirkland in January 2010, but said that "talk of me bidding £5m for Chris Kirkland is garbage, but he is a very good goalkeeper, and I'm a big, big admirer of him". Speaking in March 2010, manager Roberto Martínez said that "if you look at the standard of his performances – week in, week out – it is up there with the best in England".

At the start of the 2010–11 season, Wigan were heavily defeated in their first two matches against Blackpool and Chelsea. He was replaced in the starting line-up by Ali Al-Habsi. On 25 November 2010, Kirkland joined Championship club Leicester City on loan until January. A back spasm suffered during training in early December nearly ended his stint at the club, but he resumed his loan after making a speedy recovery. He made his debut in a 3–0 defeat to Ipswich Town on 19 December. Kirkland returned to Wigan for treatment on his back injury, after making three appearances at The Walkers Stadium. He was stretchered off after a collision with Johan Elmander in a 1–1 draw against Bolton Wanderers on 5 January 2011; Kirkland was in the Wigan squad due to Ali Al-Habsi's ineligibility to play against his parent club.

Kirkland was going to join Cardiff City on an emergency loan in February 2011 as cover for goalkeeper Tom Heaton, but the deal fell through after he picked up a virus. On 12 October 2011, Kirkland joined Championship Doncaster Rovers on loan until January after attracting interest from new manager Dean Saunders. After less than a week into his loan spell at the Keepmoat Stadium, Kirkland was sent back to parent club Wigan following another back spasm.

=== Sheffield Wednesday ===
In May 2012, Kirkland signed a two-year contract with Championship club Sheffield Wednesday; manager Dave Jones said whoever played best out of Kirkland and Stephen Bywater during pre-season would win a first-team place. Kirkland made his Wednesday debut in a 4–2 League Cup win over Oldham Athletic on 13 August 2012. On 19 October, he was assaulted by a fan who had run onto the pitch during the 1–1 draw against Leeds United. Kirkland required several minutes of treatment after the assault, which was captured on television cameras and immediately followed a Leeds goal. His attacker, Aaron Cawley, went on to plead guilty to assault and was jailed for 16 weeks. Kirkland remained as first-choice goalkeeper throughout most of the 2012–13 and 2013–14 campaigns, but was relegated to second-choice behind Keiren Westwood throughout the majority of the 2014–15 season and left Hillsborough in July 2015 after turning down manager Stuart Gray's offer of a new contract.

=== Later career ===
On 12 August 2015, Kirkland joined Championship club Preston North End on a one-year contract. He was signed as an understudy to on loan goalkeeper Jordan Pickford, and remained on the bench after Pickford was recalled, as Sam Johnstone and Anders Lindegaard also joined the club on loan. Kirkland was released by manager Simon Grayson when his contract at Deepdale expired at the end of the 2015–16 season.

Kirkland joined League One club Bury on a one-year contract in June 2016. He left Gigg Lane for personal reasons before the 2016–17 season began in August. He later revealed that he had been fighting a four-year battle with depression.

== International career ==
Kirkland won eight caps with the England national under-21 team and was regularly selected for the senior squad from 2003 onwards, but did not make an appearance until he came on as a substitute for the second half of a friendly against Greece in August 2006. When Kirkland was eleven years old, his father and some family friends had placed bets of £100 each at 100/1 odds that he would play for England before the age of 30; Kirkland's appearance netted the group £10,000 each.

== Style of play ==
Kirkland was identified at an early age as a goalkeeper with an "uncommon mixture of height, agility and bravery".

== Coaching career ==
Kirkland began coaching the goalkeepers at League One club Port Vale in January 2017 as a favour to his friend and former teammate Michael Brown. He also set up the Chris Kirkland Goalkeeper Academy.

In July 2018, Kirkland returned to Liverpool as a goalkeeping coach for the women's team. He was appointed caretaker manager of the team on 14 September upon the resignation of Neil Redfearn. Following Vicky Jepson's appointment as permanent manager on 26 October, he returned to his previous role as goalkeeping coach. He took on the additional duty as assistant manager. He quit the role in March 2019 to focus on the growing demands of running his goalkeeping academy. He was appointed as head goalkeeping coach at Colne in June 2020.

== Personal life ==
He and his wife Leeona had a daughter, Lucy, born on 14 November 2006, which caused him to miss an international friendly match against Netherlands the next day. In April 2008, Kirkland teamed up with fellow professionals Kevin Davies and Brett Emerton to help launch the Get Started programme. This national scheme aims to tackle re-offending. He visited Hindley Youth Offenders' Institution in support of the scheme, which is delivered by The Prince's Trust in partnership with the Premier League, the PFA and the Football Foundation.

In July 2022, Kirkland opened up about his painkiller addiction and revealed he had previously considered taking his own life. In July 2024, Kirkland was awarded an honorary doctorate for his mental health work by Edge Hill University.

== Career statistics ==
=== Club ===
Appearances and goals by club, season and competition
| Club | Season | League | | | FA Cup | | League Cup | | Europe | | Total | |
| Club | Season | Division | Apps | Goals | Apps | Goals | Apps | Goals | Apps | Goals | Apps | Goals |
|---|---|---|---|---|---|---|---|---|---|---|---|---|
| Coventry City | 1998–99 | Premier League | 0 | 0 | 0 | 0 | 0 | 0 | — | | 0 | 0 |
| Coventry City | 1999–2000 | Premier League | 0 | 0 | 0 | 0 | 1 | 0 | — | | 1 | 0 |
| Coventry City | 2000–01 | Premier League | 23 | 0 | 1 | 0 | 3 | 0 | — | | 27 | 0 |
| Coventry City | 2001–02 | First Division | 1 | 0 | — | | — | | — | | 1 | 0 |
| Coventry City | Total | | 24 | 0 | 1 | 0 | 4 | 0 | — | | 29 | 0 |
| Liverpool | 2001–02 | Premier League | 1 | 0 | 0 | 0 | 1 | 0 | 2 (Note: Appearances in UEFA Champions League) | 0 | 4 | 0 |
| Liverpool | 2002–03 | Premier League | 8 | 0 | 2 | 0 | 4 | 0 | 1 (Note: Appearance(s) in UEFA Cup) | 0 | 15 | 0 |
| Liverpool | 2003–04 | Premier League | 6 | 0 | 1 | 0 | 1 | 0 | 4 | 0 | 12 | 0 |
| Liverpool | 2004–05 | Premier League | 10 | 0 | 0 | 0 | 0 | 0 | 4 | 0 | 14 | 0 |
| Liverpool | Total | | 25 | 0 | 3 | 0 | 6 | 0 | 11 | 0 | 45 | 0 |
| West Bromwich Albion (loan) | 2005–06 | Premier League | 10 | 0 | 2 | 0 | 0 | 0 | — | | 12 | 0 |
| Wigan Athletic | 2006–07 | Premier League | 26 | 0 | 0 | 0 | 0 | 0 | — | | 26 | 0 |
| Wigan Athletic | 2007–08 | Premier League | 37 | 0 | 1 | 0 | 0 | 0 | — | | 38 | 0 |
| Wigan Athletic | 2008–09 | Premier League | 32 | 0 | 0 | 0 | 2 | 0 | — | | 34 | 0 |
| Wigan Athletic | 2009–10 | Premier League | 32 | 0 | 0 | 0 | 0 | 0 | — | | 32 | 0 |
| Wigan Athletic | 2010–11 | Premier League | 4 | 0 | 0 | 0 | 0 | 0 | — | | 4 | 0 |
| Wigan Athletic | 2011–12 | Premier League | 0 | 0 | 0 | 0 | 0 | 0 | — | | 0 | 0 |
| Wigan Athletic | Total | | 131 | 0 | 1 | 0 | 2 | 0 | — | | 134 | 0 |
| Leicester City (loan) | 2010–11 | Championship | 3 | 0 | — | | — | | — | | 3 | 0 |
| Doncaster Rovers (loan) | 2011–12 | Championship | 1 | 0 | — | | — | | — | | 1 | 0 |
| Sheffield Wednesday | 2012–13 | Championship | 46 | 0 | 0 | 0 | 1 | 0 | — | | 47 | 0 |
| Sheffield Wednesday | 2013–14 | Championship | 35 | 0 | 0 | 0 | 1 | 0 | — | | 36 | 0 |
| Sheffield Wednesday | 2014–15 | Championship | 4 | 0 | 1 | 0 | 3 | 0 | — | | 8 | 0 |
| Sheffield Wednesday | Total | | 85 | 0 | 1 | 0 | 5 | 0 | — | | 91 | 0 |
| Preston North End | 2015–16 | Championship | 5 | 0 | 1 | 0 | 0 | 0 | — | | 6 | 0 |
| Career total | | | 284 | 0 | 9 | 0 | 17 | 0 | 11 | 0 | 321 | 0 |

=== International ===
Appearances and goals by national team and year
| National team | Year | Apps | Goals |
|---|---|---|---|
| England | 2006 | 1 | 0 |
| Total | | 1 | 0 |

== Honours ==
Coventry City

- FA Youth Cup runner-up: 1998–99

Liverpool

- UEFA Champions League: 2004–05

Individual

- Coventry City Players' Player of the Year: 2000–01
- Wigan Athletic Players' Player of the Year: 2007–08
