= Dejphon Chansiri =

Thai businessman (born 1968)

- เดชพล จันศิริ
- Born: 3 June 1968 (age 58); Bangkok, Thailand
- Occupation: Businessman
- Known for: Owning Sheffield Wednesday
- Spouse: Tipparut Chansiri

Dejphon Chansiri (Thai: เดชพล จันศิริ, born 3 June 1968) is a Thai businessman who, from 2015 to 2025, owned then EFL Championship club Sheffield Wednesday.

== Career ==
Chansiri's family controls the Thai Union Group, the world's largest producer of canned tuna. The Chansiri family's net worth was estimated by Forbes to be US$575 million as of 2020.

== Sheffield Wednesday ==
In January 2015, a consortium led by Chansiri acquired a 100% stake in EFL Championship side Sheffield Wednesday from Milan Mandarić for £37.5m and targeted promotion to the Premier League by 2017. During his first transfer window he brought in Sergiu Buș, Marnick Vermijl, Filipe Melo on deadline day, as well as loans for Will Keane and Lewis McGugan.

During early 2015, Chansiri changed many aspects of the Sheffield Wednesday set-up. He brought in a new transfer committee of manager Stuart Gray, Glenn Roeder and Adam Pearson. Adam Pearson left within a month to work for Leeds United. Gray left the committee at the end of the season, being replaced by new manager Carlos Carvalhal, whilst Roeder left by the end of 2015.

Chansiri invested heavily that first season, bringing in multiple signings including, Fernando Forestieri, Gary Hooper and Lucas João and the first full season saw Wednesday make the playoff final, eventually losing to Hull City 1–0 in the final.

The following season, the investment into the first team squad continued, with more big money signings Almen Abdi, Adam Reach and Jordan Rhodes all made. Wednesday again made the playoffs, but this time lost in the semi-final to Huddersfield Town.

In the 2017–18 season, the investment began to dry up, and injuries meant Wednesday struggled, with manager Carlos Carvalhal losing his job just before Christmas and being replaced by Dutch manager Jos Luhukay.

Jos Luhukay was sacked as manager the following Christmas after only being able to bring in Joey Pelupessy and the loan signings of Josh Onomah and Michael Hector during his year in charge. He was replaced by ex-Sheffield United manager Steve Bruce in January but allowed to start the following month.

Steve Bruce joined Newcastle United the following summer and Chansiri brought in Garry Monk to replace him almost two months later.

The next summer, the club received a 12-point penalty which was later reduced to six points for breaching the League's Profitability and Sustainability Rules for the three season reporting period ending in 2017–18. It was then revealed Chansiri was securing debt against the stadium. Monk was then sacked and replaced by Tony Pulis who was later relieved of his duties after ten games in charge, picking up seven points from a possible 30 and just one win. In December, it was announced that the players were not paid in full for the month of November, the second time this has happened in 2020. In January, it was announced that players were not paid again for January, with news that salaries were capped at £7,000 per month. Darren Moore was appointed the third manager of the season in March, two months after Tony Pulis was dismissed. The club was relegated in May to EFL League One after nine years in the Championship. After relegation, it was revealed again that players had still not been paid in full for some months and that some players were considering walking away over ongoing wages issues.

More high-profile players left in the summer, with Tom Lees, Adam Reach, Jordan Rhodes and Keiren Westwood all being released. Chansiri bought 18 new players for manager Darren Moore to try and get back to the Championship at the first time of asking, but the side subsequently failed in the playoff semi-finals.

Darren Moore got another season, and, after a successful playoff campaign, beating Barnsley at Wembley stadium, Wednesday won promotion back to the EFL Championship.

Ahead of the first season back in the Championship, Darren Moore was relieved of his duties. While unveiling new manager Xisco Muñoz ahead of the 2023–24 season, Chansiri ranted about former Sheffield Wednesday midfielder Carlton Palmer following criticism of the club on Twitter. In September 2023, Chansiri announced that he would invest no further money in the club after protests which included damage being caused, insults aimed at Chansiri and people approaching his family. These had followed poor performances by the club which had left them bottom of the Championship. In October 2023, the English Football League put the club under a registration embargo due to the club not paying a bill to HM Revenue and Customs. Chansiri subsequently asked the club's fans for £2m to help pay the debt and cover wages, saying it was a problem with cashflow; the following day he confirmed the outstanding debts and salaries had been paid. Xisco oversaw the club's worst start to a season and was fired in October. His replacement, Danny Röhl, saved the club from immediate relegation on the final day of the season.

On 1 November 2024, the club was again placed under a registration embargo for failing to pay HMRC for the second year in a row, with the tax bill paid on 14 November. Cashflow problems recurred later in the season, with players and club staff not being paid on time in March and May.

In June 2025, Sheffield Wednesday was charged by the EFL with several breaches of regulations relating to payment obligations. Chansiri was also charged with "causing the club to be in breach of EFL Regulations despite his commitment to fund their cash requirements". On 4 June, the member of parliament for Sheffield South East, Clive Betts accused Chansiri of holding the team "hostage" and urged potential buyers for the club to come forward. The club was also barred from carrying out any transfers or loans involving a fee in the summer 2025 window and the two 2026 transfer windows. Players' wages were again unpaid in June 2025; some players handed in their notice, as permitted when players' wages are delayed in two consecutive months.

In August 2025, Sheffield Wednesday fans held a large protest against Chansiri before and during the match against Leicester City at the King Power Stadium. Fans stayed outside the stadium during kick-off, deliberately leaving empty seats, while a large banner that reads “SWFC for sale – enough is enough” was left on the empty seats. On 4 October 2025, second-bottom Wednesday were humbled 5–0 at Hillsborough by Coventry City in a game interrupted by fans entering the pitch to protest against Chansiri's ownership after wages were not paid on time for the fifth time in seven months. The Sheffield Wednesday Supporters Trust led a boycott of all sales of merchandise and food and drink sales inside the ground to starve Chansiri of any further funds to try to hasten his exit and also urged fans to boycott the sale of "early-bird" season ticket sales.

The SWFC Supporters Trust called for a full fans boycott of the home game against Middlesbrough on 22 October 2025. With this game being broadcast live on Sky Sports it was a perfect opportunity to highlight the cause and struggles of the fans against Chansiri which was deemed a success, with the majority of the 7,081 crowd being made up of Middlesbrough's travelling support. Protest images against Chansiri's ownership were also projected onto the exterior of the stadium.

On 24 October 2025, Sheffield Wednesday announced that it had been placed into administration, being automatically docked 12 points as a result. This effectively ended Chansiri's 10-year ownership of the club. On the same day, seats spelling out his name in the North Stand seats at Hillsborough were in the process of being removed. On 1 December 2025, Chansiri was prohibited from being an owner or director of any EFL club for a period of three years.
