= Jérémy Hélan =

French footballer (born 1992)

Personal information
- Full name: Jérémy Hélan
- Date of birth: 9 May 1992 (age 34)
- Place of birth: Clichy-la-Garenne, France
- Height: 1.81 m (5 ft 11 in)
- Position: Left midfielder

Youth career
- 2001–2007: Aubervilliers
- 2005–2008: INF Clairefontaine
- 2008–2009: Stade Rennais
- 2009–2011: Manchester City

Senior career*
Years	Team	Apps	(Gls)
2011–2013	Manchester City	0	(0)
2011	→ Carlisle United (loan)	2	(0)
2012	→ Shrewsbury Town (loan)	3	(0)
2012–2013	→ Sheffield Wednesday (loan)	28	(1)
2013–2016	Sheffield Wednesday	100	(3)
2016	→ Wolverhampton Wanderers (loan)	8	(0)
Total		141	(4)

International career
2010	France U-19	3	(0)
- * Club domestic league appearances and goals

Jérémy Hélan (born 9 May 1992) is a French former professional footballer who played as a left midfielder. He last played for Sheffield Wednesday, whom he joined from Manchester City for an undisclosed fee in July 2013. He retired from football in September 2016.

== Career ==
Born in Clichy-la-Garenne, Hélan started his career in the youth team AS Jeunesse d'Aubervilliers from the age of eleven. He spent three years at the Clairefontaine academy between 2005 and 2008, before joining Stade Rennais.

=== Manchester City ===
Helan controversially signed for Manchester City in February 2009 after deciding to see out the remainder of his professional contract with Rennes, and was accordingly suspended from international football for a month. For the remainder of the 2008–09 season and during the next two seasons Hélan established himself as a regular player in the City Elite Development Squad. In 2011, Hélan was among six players from the Elite Development Squad to be included for the pre-season tour in Poland. The following year also saw Hélan signing a new contract with the club.

He made his debut for the club on 25 September as a 106th-minute substitute as they lost a Football League Cup third round match to Aston Villa.

==== Loan spells ====
In October 2011, Hélan joined League One side Carlisle United on a one-month loan deal. He made his professional debut for his new loan club in a 3–0 win over Yeovil Town at Huish Park after coming on as a substitute for Jon-Paul McGovern. Hélan also made another appearance against Exeter City on 5 November 2011, where he played for 16 minutes, in a 0–0 draw. After this, Hélan returned to his parent club despite Carlisle wanting to extend his loan spell for a second month.

On 25 October 2012, Hélan joined League One side Shrewsbury Town on a one-month loan deal. He made his debut two days later, in a 2–2 draw at home to Colchester United. Hélan went on to make three more appearances before being recalled by his parent club on 22 November 2012.

=== Sheffield Wednesday ===
On 22 November 2012, Hélan signed on loan for Sheffield Wednesday on a one-month deal. He made his debut two days later, playing the full 90 minutes in a 2–0 defeat at home to Leicester City. He scored his first goal for the club on 22 December in a 2–0 win at home to Charlton Athletic. Two days later, his loan spell with the club was extended until 19 January 2013. On 29 December 2012, in a match against Huddersfield Town which ended 0–0, he was involved in a bizarre incident where he was "twice" booked by the referee but did not get sent off as the first yellow card was mistakenly given to his teammate Michail Antonio for diving. On 30 January 2013, Hélan rejoined Sheffield Wednesday on loan until the end of the season and went on to finish the 2012–13 season, scoring once in 28 appearances.

Despite attracting the attention of a host of clubs including Wolves after rising to the fore with the Owls, Hélan was told by the Manchester City management that he would be loaned out once again, Hélan signed for Sheffield Wednesday on a permanent basis in the summer, signing a four-year contract, keeping him until the summer of 2017. Upon joining the club, Hélan was given number seventeen shirt for the new season.

Hélan's first game after signing for the club on a permanent basis came in the opening game of the season in a 2–1 loss against Queens Park Rangers. Three weeks later on 24 August 2013, Hélan scored his first goal since his return to the club in a 2–2 draw against Millwall. Hélan then scored his second goal for the club in a 2–1 win over Huddersfield Town on 22 February 2014. As the 2013–14 season progressed Hélan, after first playing in the left-wing position, switched to the left-back position following the club's defensive crisis. Hélan finished his first permanent season at Sheffield Wednesday, making 43 appearances and scoring twice in the 2013–14 season.

Ahead of the 2014–15 season, Hélan suffered an abductor strain during a friendly match against Doncaster Rovers and was expected to be sidelined between four and six weeks. Although he missed the first two games, Hélan made his return to training. and made his first appearance of the season, coming on as a substitute for Jacques Maghoma, in a 1–1 draw against Millwall on 19 August 2014. Hélan then scored his first Sheffield Wednesday goal of the season, in a 2–0 win over Birmingham City on 16 September 2014 and then provided an assist for Atdhe Nuhiu to score the only goal in the game, in a 1–0 win over Wigan Athletic on 30 December 2014. Five days later, on 4 January 2015, Hélan played 90 minutes against his former club, Manchester City, in third round of FA Cup, which they lost 2–1. Hélan finished the 2014–15 season at Sheffield Wednesday, making 38 appearances and scoring once.

The 2015–16 season saw Hélan competing with Rhoys Wiggins for the left-back position. However, in a match against Brentford on 26 September 2015, Hélan received a red card after a second bookable offence, in a 2–1 win for Sheffield Wednesday. After returning from suspension, Hélan found himself rotated under the new management of Carlos Carvalhal, which saw him in and out of the first team, but mostly on the substitute bench. Following a loan spell at Wolverhampton Wanderers, Hélan made his return to the Sheffield Wednesday first team, coming on as a late substitute, and was booked soon after in a 1–1 draw against Derby County on 23 April 2016. He also appeared in the last game of the season, against Wolves, the club he played for between January and April, in a 2–1 loss. Hélan featured in the Championship play-off final, coming on as a substitute for Ross Wallace in the 63rd minute, in a 1–0 loss against Hull City. Hélan later finished the 2015–16 season, making 17 appearances.

==== Wolverhampton Wanderers (loan) ====
On 25 February 2016, Hélan moved on loan for the remainder of the 2015–16 season to fellow Championship side Wolverhampton Wanderers. Hélan made his Wolves debut two days later, making his first start and playing 90 minutes, in a 2–1 win over Derby County. Following this, Hélan was given a handful of first team appearances that led to a possible permanent move made in the summer. However, due to his parent club's lack of defensive option, Hélan was recalled by the club on 21 April 2016. Manager Kenny Jackett stated that Hélan could one day make a permanent return to Wolves.

Although he appeared once for Sheffield Wednesday in the 2016–17 season, it was announced on 18 September 2016 that Hélan had decided to retire from football, at the age of 24, in order to focus on his Islamic religion, his disillusionment with the game being another factor. However, his contract with Sheffield Wednesday did not expire until the end of the 2016–17 season.

== International career ==
Hélan previously represented France U-16, France U-17 and France U-19.

== Personal life ==
In an interview with News and Star, Hélan stated he had an ambition to have a career in football. Hélan speaks English and French and currently learning Arabic. Hélan is a devout Muslim and spent increasing amounts of time at a mosque in Saudi Arabia that he intended to go to once he retired.

== Career statistics ==
Appearances and goals by club, season and competition
Club	Season	League			FA Cup		League Cup		Other		Total	
Club	Season	Division	Apps	Goals	Apps	Goals	Apps	Goals	Apps	Goals	Apps	Goals
Carlisle United (loan)	2011–12	League One	2	0	0	0	0	0	0	0	2	0
Manchester City	2012–13	Premier League	0	0	0	0	1	0	0	0	1	0
Shrewsbury Town (loan)	2012–13	League One	3	0	1	0	0	0	0	0	4	0
Sheffield Wednesday (loan)	2012–13	Championship	28	1	0	0	0	0	—		28	1
Sheffield Wednesday	2013–14	Championship	43	2	4	0	1	0	—		48	2
Sheffield Wednesday	2014–15	Championship	38	1	1	0	2	0	—		41	1
Sheffield Wednesday	2015–16	Championship	17	0	1	0	4	0	—		22	0
Career total			131	4	7	0	7	0	0	0	146	4
