= Filipe Melo (footballer) =

Portuguese footballer

Personal information
- Full name: Filipe Joaquim Melo Silva
- Date of birth: 3 November 1989 (age 37)
- Place of birth: Santa Maria de Lamas, Portugal
- Height: 1.89 m (6 ft 2 1/2 in)
- Position: Defensive midfielder

Youth career
- 1998–2006: União Lamas

Senior career*
Years	Team	Apps	(Gls)
2006−2009	União Lamas	39	(1)
2009−2012	Beira-Mar	0	(0)
2009−2010	→ Avanca (loan)	21	(1)
2010−2011	→ Espinho (loan)	23	(0)
2011−2012	→ Arouca (loan)	11	(1)
2012−2013	Naval	29	(0)
2013−2015	Moreirense	52	(2)
2015–2017	Sheffield Wednesday	6	(0)
2017	→ Paços Ferreira (loan)	16	(0)
2017–2019	Chaves	15	(0)
2019–2021	Farense	31	(0)
2021–2022	Vilafranquense	14	(0)
2022–2025	União Lamas	69	(4)
- * Club domestic league appearances and goals as of 18:11, 30 December 2025 (UTC)

Filipe Joaquim Melo Silva (born 3 November 1989), known as Melo, is a Portuguese footballer who plays as a defensive midfielder.

== Club career ==
=== Portugal ===
Born in Santa Maria de Lamas, Aveiro District, Melo kicked off his career with local C.F. União de Lamas after joining their youth system in 1998. He continued competing in the lower leagues until the age of 21, successively representing A.A. Avanca and S.C. Espinho, both while on loan from S.C. Beira-Mar, who also ceded him to F.C. Arouca where he made his professional debut in 2011–12, scoring his only goal of the season in a 1−0 Segunda Liga win against C.D. Santa Clara on 22 January 2012.

In the summer of 2012, free agent Melo signed a one-year contract with Associação Naval 1º de Maio also in the second division. For 2013–14, he joined Moreirense F.C. of the same league alongside Diogo Cunha and Jorge Pires. On 27 November 2013, in a 2−0 loss at C.D. Aves, he was sent off in the 71st minute for fouling Pedro Pereira, being again redcarded in a goalless draw against S.C. Covilhã the following month. His first goal of the campaign came in a 7−1 away victory over C.D. Trofense on 16 January 2014, and he would score one more in 35 games in his first year as the team returned to the Primeira Liga after a one-year absence; he was also awarded captaincy during this timeframe.

=== Sheffield Wednesday ===
Melo signed a three-year deal with English Championship club Sheffield Wednesday on 2 February 2015 for an undisclosed fee, joining compatriots Carlos Carvalhal (coach), Lucas João, Marco Matias and José Semedo. He made his debut eight days later, in a 2−1 away defeat against Ipswich Town where he came on as a 58th-minute substitute for Sam Hutchinson.

In November 2015, it was announced that Melo had been ruled out for the remainder of the season after undergoing knee surgery.

=== Return home ===
Melo went back to Portugal's top flight on 18 January 2017, joining F.C. Paços de Ferreira on loan for the rest of the campaign. He left Wednesday on 10 July, when he moved to G.D. Chaves on a three-year deal.

Having totalled just 19 appearances in two seasons for the Trás-os-Montes side, Melo terminated his contract by mutual consent with a year left in July 2019, after their relegation. Days later, he signed for two years with S.C. Farense of the second tier.

Melo remained in the division for 2021–22, with the 31-year-old agreeing to a deal at U.D. Vilafranquense.

== Career statistics ==
As of match played 24 September 2017

Appearances and goals by club, season and competition
Club	Season	League			National Cup		League Cup		Continental		Total	
Club	Season	Division	Apps	Goals	Apps	Goals	Apps	Goals	Apps	Goals	Apps	Goals
União Lamas	2006–07	Segunda Divisão	13	0	1	0	0	0	—		14	0
União Lamas	2008–09	Terceira Divisão	26	1	3	0	0	0	—		29	1
União Lamas	Total		39	1	4	0	0	0	—		43	1
Avanca (loan)	2009–10	Terceira Divisão	21	1	0	0	0	0	—		21	1
Espinho (loan)	2010–11	Segunda Divisão	23	0	4	0	0	0	—		27	0
Arouca (loan)	2011–12	Segunda Liga	11	1	0	0	2	0	—		13	1
Naval	2012–13	Segunda Liga	29	0	1	0	8	0	—		38	0
Moreirense	2013–14	Segunda Liga	35	2	0	0	5	0	—		40	2
Moreirense	2014–15	Primeira Liga	17	0	1	0	3	0	—		21	0
Moreirense	Total		52	2	1	0	8	0	—		61	2
Sheffield Wednesday	2014–15	Championship	6	0	0	0	0	0	—		6	0
Sheffield Wednesday	2015–16	Championship	0	0	0	0	0	0	—		0	0
Sheffield Wednesday	Total		6	0	0	0	0	0	—		6	0
Paços Ferreira (loan)	2016–17	Primeira Liga	16	0	0	0	0	0	—		16	0
Chaves	2017–18	Primeira Liga	3	0	0	0	1	0	—		4	0
Career total			200	5	10	0	19	0	0	0	229	5
