= Matt Young (footballer, born 1994) =

English footballer

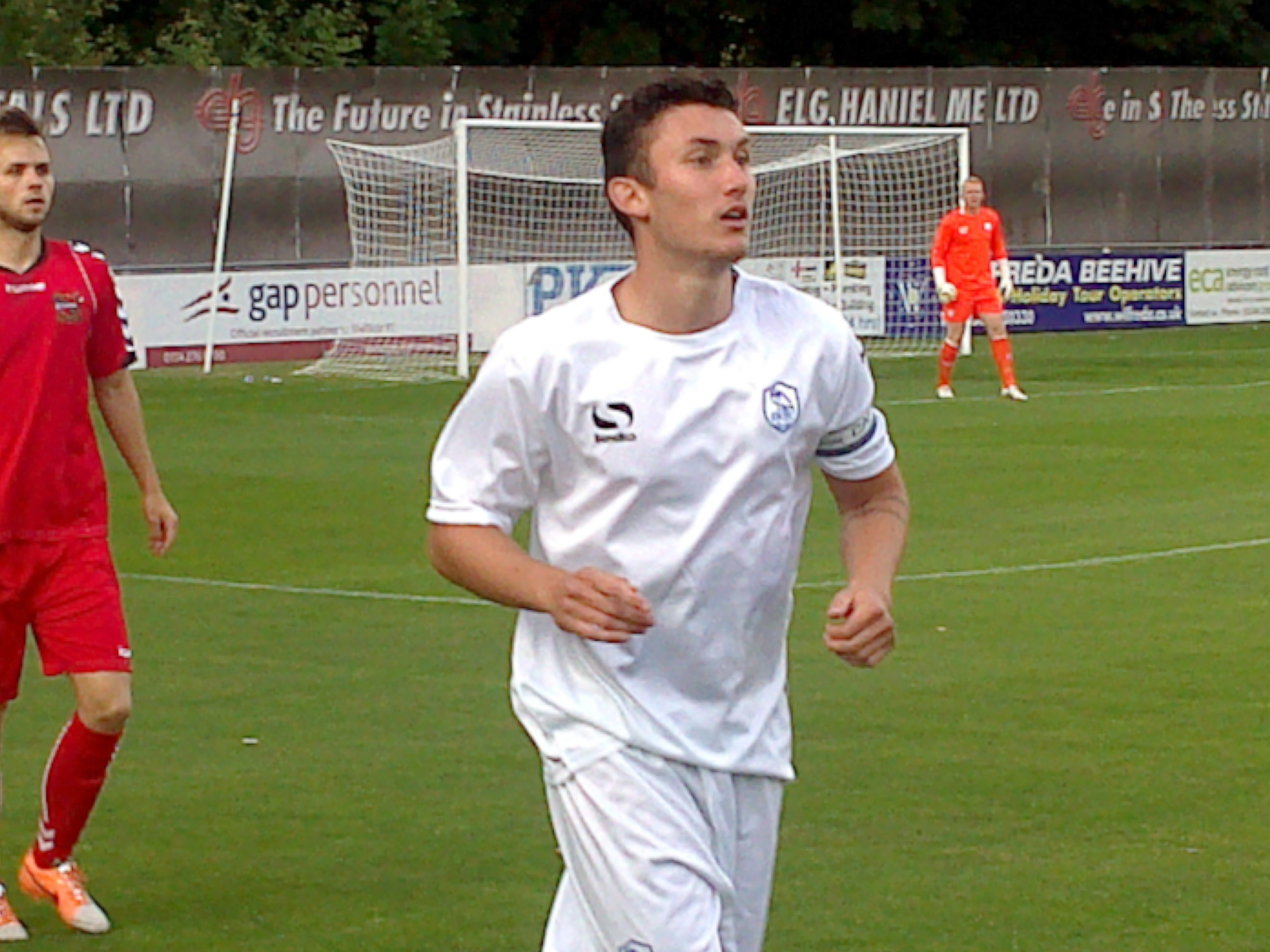

Personal information
- Full name: Matthew Robert Young
- Date of birth: 26 January 1994 (age 32)
- Place of birth: Romford, England
- Height: 1.83 m (6 ft 0 in)
- Position: Defender

Youth career
- 2003–2004: Charlton Athletic
- 2004–2010: Tottenham Hotspur
- 2010–2012: Southampton

Senior career*
Years	Team	Apps	(Gls)
2012–2014	Southampton	0	(0)
2014–2015	Sheffield Wednesday	0	(0)
2015	→ Carlisle United (loan)	20	(0)
2015	Dover Athletic	2	(0)
2015–2016	Kidderminster Harriers	8	(0)
2016	Billericay Town	6	(0)
2016	Welling United	0	(0)
2016–2017	Chelmsford City	10	(1)
2017–2018	Woking	34	(0)
2018–2019	Chelmsford City	17	(0)
2019–2020	Hampton & Richmond Borough	14	(1)
- * Club domestic league appearances and goals as of 21:10, 23 January 2021 (UTC)

Matthew Robert Young (born 26 January 1994) is an English footballer who last played as a defender for National League South club Hampton & Richmond Borough.

== Club career ==
After a spell as a youngster at Tottenham Hotspur, which spanned from the ages of 10–16, Young signed scholarship forms at Southampton at aged 16, and signed his first professional contract for Southampton in May 2012.

Failing to break into the first team, he left Southampton in the summer of 2014 to join Sheffield Wednesday. He signed a one-year contract with Sheffield Wednesday on 3 June 2014. On 10 January 2015, he signed for Carlisle United on a one-month loan deal. He made his Football League debut later that day in a 1–0 loss to Cambridge United. Three games into his loan spell, he extended his stay at Carlisle United for the rest of the season. He made twenty appearances, all of which came as starts, for the League Two side. After his loan spell ended in May 2015, he was one of eleven players to leave Sheffield Wednesday.

In July 2015, Young spent pre season with National League club Barrow. Following his short spell at Barrow, he signed for fellow National League club Dover Athletic on 7 August 2015. His first appearance for the club came from off the bench in the first game of the season in a 2–1 defeat against Barrow.

Young signed for Kidderminster Harriers in October 2015 on a deal until the end of the year. He made 10 first team appearances, including a game winning assist in a home game versus Woking which ended the Harriers wretched run of form. He went on to join Isthmian League Premier Division club Billericay Town at the start of the 2016–17 season, making six appearances before departing in September to go on trial with League Two club Exeter City.

On 30 September 2016, Young joined Chelmsford City. He left the club again at the end of the season.

On 3 August 2017, Young joined Woking two days before the season was due to start. On 15 August 2017, Young made his Woking debut during their 2–1 home victory over Eastleigh, replacing Louis Ramsay in the 89th minute. On 28 August 2017, Young replaced Norwich City loanee, Louis Ramsay in the starting lineup to make his first start for the Cards during their impressive 4–1 home victory against Torquay United. On 12 December 2017, Young scored his first Woking goal in their FA Cup second round tie against Peterborough United, netting the Cards' second equaliser of the game in the 5–2 defeat.

On 28 July 2018, following a pre-season trial Crawley Town, Young opted to return to Chelmsford City on a one-year deal. On 9 May 2019, Young left Chelmsford City.

On 6 September 2019, Young signed for Hampton & Richmond Borough.

== Career statistics ==
As of match played 11 January 2020.

Appearances and goals by club, season and competition
Club	Season	League			FA Cup		League Cup		Other		Total	
Club	Season	Division	Apps	Goals	Apps	Goals	Apps	Goals	Apps	Goals	Apps	Goals
Sheffield Wednesday	2014–15	Championship	0	0	0	0	0	0	—		0	0
Carlisle United (loan)	2014–15	League Two	20	0	0	0	0	0	0	0	20	0
Dover Athletic	2015–16	National League	2	0	0	0	—		0	0	2	0
Kidderminster Harriers	2015–16	National League	8	0	1	0	—		2	0	11	0
Billericay Town	2016–17	Isthmian League Premier Division	6	0	0	0	—		0	0	6	0
Welling United	2016–17	National League South	0	0	0	0	—		0	0	0	0
Chelmsford City	2016–17	National League South	10	1	0	0	—		2 (Note: Appearance(s) in FA Trophy)	0	12	1
Woking	2017–18	National League	34	0	6	1	—		1	0	41	1
Chelmsford City	2018–19	National League South	17	0	1	0	—		1	0	19	0
Hampton & Richmond Borough	2019–20	National League South	14	1	2	0	—		4	0	20	1
Career total			111	2	10	1	0	0	10	0	132	3
