= José Semedo (footballer, born 1985) =

Portuguese footballer

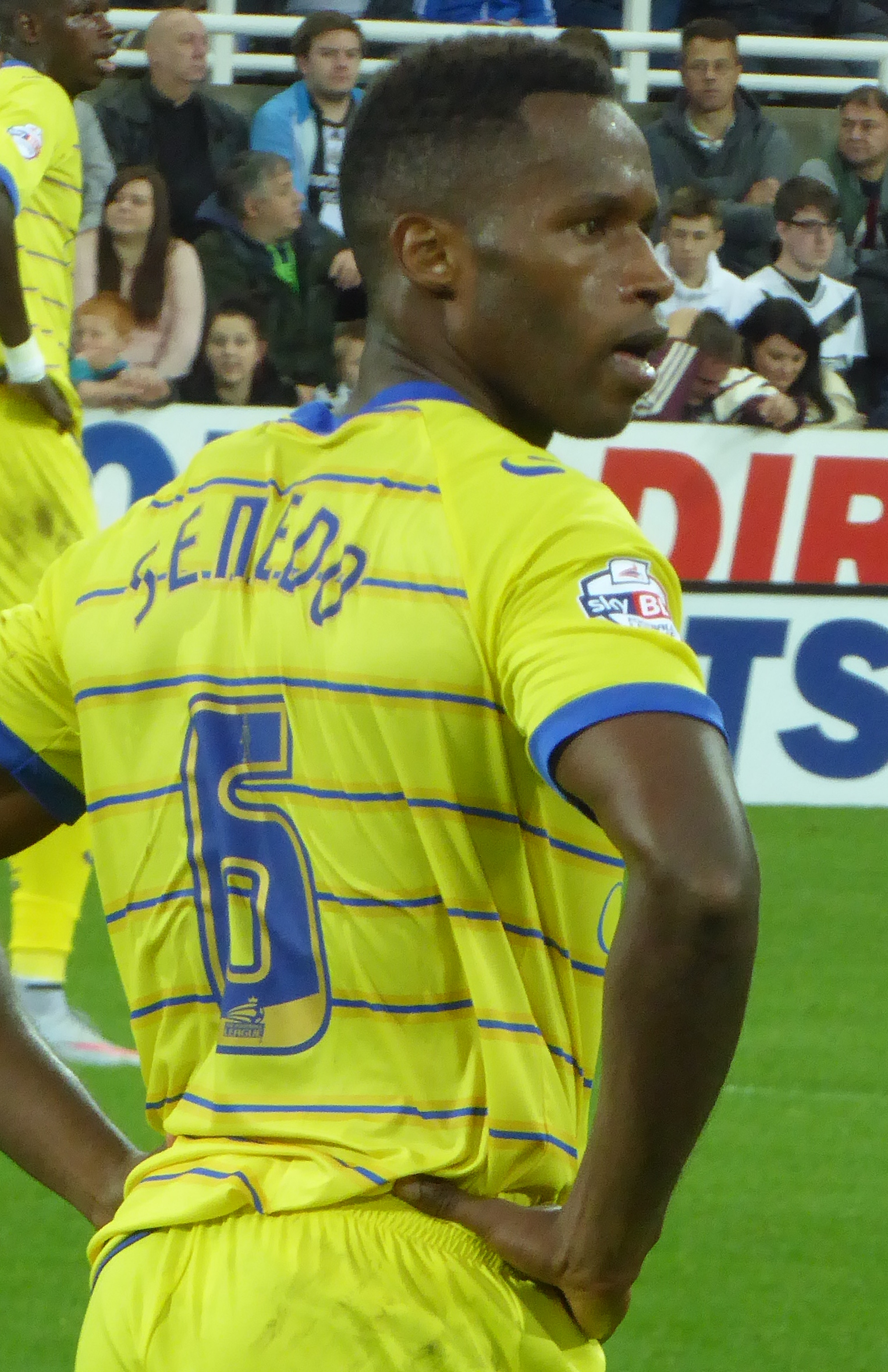
- Semedo with Sheffield Wednesday in 2015

Personal information
- Full name: José Vítor Moreira Semedo
- Date of birth: 11 January 1985 (age 41)
- Place of birth: Setúbal, Portugal
- Height: 1.81 m (5 ft 11 in)
- Position: Defensive midfielder

Team information
- Current team: Al-Nassr (chief executive officer)

Youth career
- 1994–1995: Pelezinhos
- 1995–1998: Sporting CP
- 1998–1999: Pontes
- 1999–2004: Sporting CP

Senior career*
Years	Team	Apps	(Gls)
2003	Sporting CP B	3	(0)
2004–2007	Sporting CP	0	(0)
2004–2005	→ Casa Pia (loan)	33	(2)
2005–2006	→ Feirense (loan)	16	(0)
2006–2007	→ Cagliari (loan)	3	(0)
2007–2011	Charlton Athletic	135	(2)
2011–2017	Sheffield Wednesday	144	(1)
2017–2023	Vitória Setúbal	132	(7)
Total		466	(12)

International career
2001–2002	Portugal U17	11	(0)
2002–2003	Portugal U18	6	(0)
2003–2004	Portugal U19	7	(0)
2004–2005	Portugal U20	3	(0)
2005–2007	Portugal U21	13	(1)
2006	Portugal B	2	(1)
- * Club domestic league appearances and goals

José Vítor Moreira Semedo (born 11 January 1985) is a Portuguese former professional footballer who played as a defensive midfielder. He is the chief executive officer of Saudi Pro League club Al-Nassr.

He spent most of his career in England, playing for a whole decade with Charlton Athletic and Sheffield Wednesday of the Football League.

== Club career ==
=== Sporting CP ===
A product of Sporting CP's youth system, Semedo was born in Setúbal and made his professional debut with modest Casa Pia, in the Lisbon area. He served another loan stint in the 2005–06 season, now with Feirense of the Segunda Liga.

Semedo was loaned again for the 2006–07 campaign, moving to Serie A's Cagliari. He made his competitive debut in the Coppa Italia, but would only appear three times in the league, the first as a late substitute in a 3–1 away loss against AC Milan on 21 April 2007. He was sent off in his last match, a 2–1 defeat at Ascoli, with the Sardinians barely avoiding relegation.

=== England ===
In 2007, Semedo signed a four-year contract with Charlton Athletic on a free transfer. Although touted as a central defender when he signed, he played mainly as a defensive midfielder for the Football League Championship side, and scored his first goal in a 4–0 win over Tranmere Rovers on 29 August 2009, with the team now in League One.

Semedo was crowned Charlton's Player of the Year in May 2011, picking up 43% of the votes in what was the club's worst season for a number of decades. However, manager Chris Powell could not offer him assurances that he would be a key member in the following season, as he aimed to create a more fluid midfield, and so, on 7 July, the player joined Sheffield Wednesday also of the English third tier, again as a free agent.

In his first season with the Owls, which ended in promotion to the Championship after finishing second behind Charlton, Semedo was voted Player of the Year and League One PFA Fans' Player of the Year. From 2013 to 2016, he was given one-year extensions to his contract.

Starting in 2015, Semedo played less often for the Hillsborough club, due to the acquisitions of Ross Wallace, Barry Bannan and Álex López. The first of those players reflected in April that "Semedo trains like an animal every day and doesn’t slacken off, even though he is not playing or in the squad".

In 2023, a mural by local artist Pete McKee inspired by Semedo's celebration of Chris O’Grady's winning goal in the 2012 victory over city rivals Sheffield United was unveiled close to Wednesday's ground.

=== Vitória Setúbal ===
On 25 May 2017, aged 32, Semedo was released. On 24 August, he returned to his country after 11 years, on a two-year deal with Vitória de Setúbal. He made his Primeira Liga debut on 10 September, replacing João Amaral for the last 19 minutes of the 2–0 home victory over Braga.

Having played 55 games and scored twice for his hometown club, Semedo signed a new two-year contract in June 2019. On 23 January 2023, the 38-year-old announced his retirement from professional football.

== International career ==
Of Cape Verdean descent, Semedo represented the Portugal under-21 team during the 2006 UEFA European Championship. He was sent off due to an aggressive foul in the only match he played; the country lost 2–0 against Serbia and Montenegro and failed to qualify from its group.

== Post-retirement ==
Semedo was named chief executive officer at Saudi Pro League club Al-Nassr on 19 July 2025, replacing Majed Al-Jumaan.

== Personal life ==
During his formative years at Sporting, Semedo became a close friend of Cristiano Ronaldo, later of Manchester United, Real Madrid, Juventus and Portugal fame. The former cited the latter as a major factor for his life not having taken a turn for the worse, if he had been dismissed from the youth academy.

Semedo's wife Soraia died in September 2021, having been hospitalised due to an infection.

== Career statistics ==
As of 10 May 2017

Appearances and goals by club, season and competition
Club	Season	League			National cup		League cup		Continental		Other		Total	
Club	Season	Division	Apps	Goals	Apps	Goals	Apps	Goals	Apps	Goals	Apps	Goals	Apps	Goals
Sporting CP	2004–05	Primeira Liga	0	0	0	0	0	0	0	0	—		0	0
Sporting CP	2005–06	Primeira Liga	0	0	0	0	0	0	0	0	—		0	0
Sporting CP	Total		0	0	0	0	0	0	0	0	0	0	0	0
Casa Pia (loan)	2004–05	Segunda Divisão	33	2	1	0	0	0	—		—		34	2
Feirense (loan)	2005–06	Segunda Liga	16	0	0	0	0	0	—		—		16	0
Cagliari (loan)	2006–07	Serie A	3	0	1	0	0	0	—		—		4	0
Charlton Athletic	2007–08	Championship	37	0	0	0	2	0	—		—		39	0
Charlton Athletic	2008–09	Championship	18	0	1	0	1	0	—		—		20	0
Charlton Athletic	2009–10	League One	38	1	1	0	1	0	—		3	0	43	1
Charlton Athletic	2010–11	League One	42	1	3	0	0	0	—		4	0	49	1
Charlton Athletic	Total		135	2	5	0	4	0	0	0	7	0	151	2
Sheffield Wednesday	2011–12	League One	46	1	4	0	0	0	—		1	0	51	1
Sheffield Wednesday	2012–13	Championship	26	0	2	0	3	0	—		—		31	0
Sheffield Wednesday	2013–14	Championship	22	0	2	0	0	0	—		—		24	0
Sheffield Wednesday	2014–15	Championship	30	0	1	0	2	0	—		—		33	0
Sheffield Wednesday	2015–16	Championship	10	0	2	0	3	1	—		—		15	1
Sheffield Wednesday	2016–17	Championship	10	0	0	0	1	0	—		—		11	0
Sheffield Wednesday	Total		144	1	11	0	9	1	0	0	1	0	165	2
Career total			331	5	18	0	13	1	0	0	8	0	370	6

== Honours ==
Sheffield Wednesday

- League One runner-up: 2011–12

Individual

- PFA Fans' Player of the Year: 2011–12
- Charlton Athletic Player of The Year: 2010–11
- Sheffield Wednesday Player of The Year: 2011–12
