= Keiren Westwood =

English footballer (born 1984)

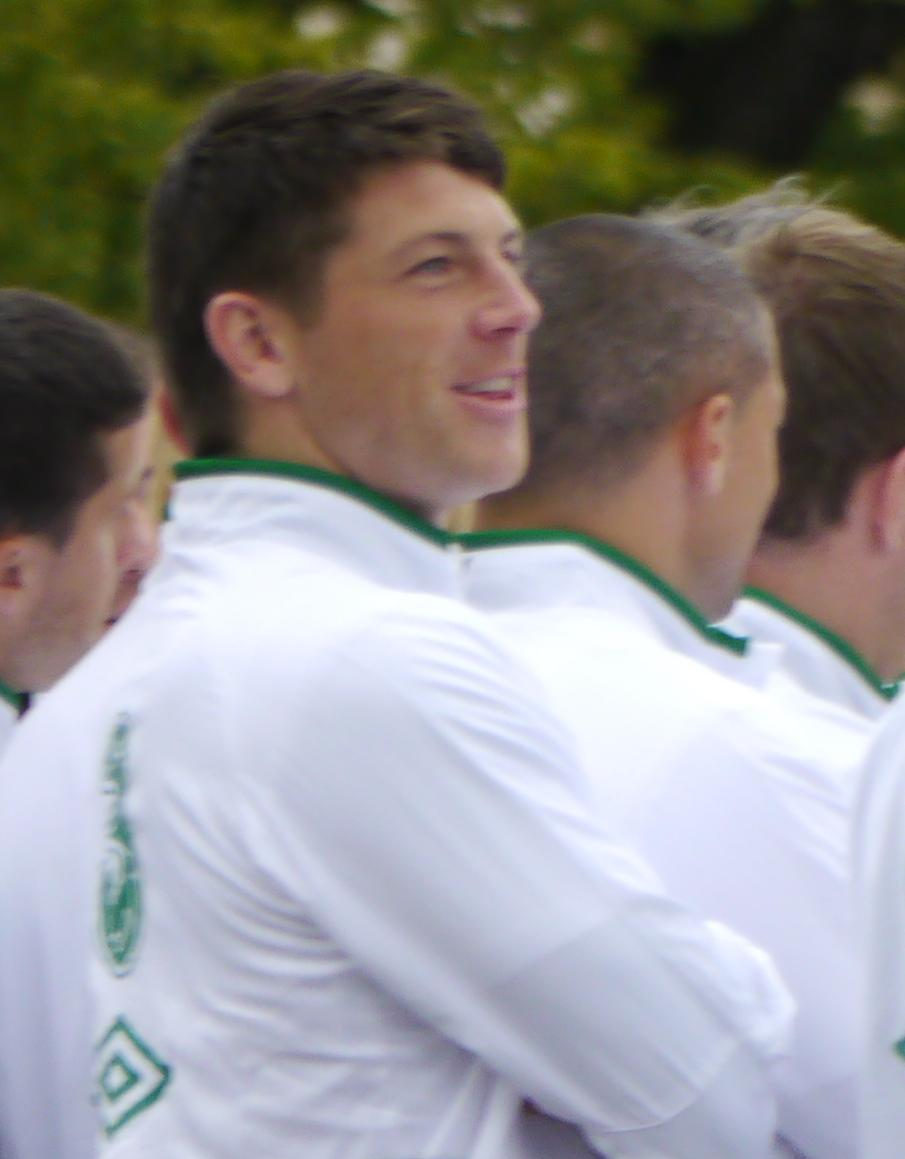
- Westwood on international duty with the Republic of Ireland in 2012

Personal information
- Full name: Keiren Westwood
- Date of birth: 23 October 1984 (age 42)
- Place of birth: Manchester, England
- Height: 6 ft 2 in (1.87 m)
- Position: Goalkeeper

Team information
- Current team: The New Saints (goalkeeping coach)

Youth career
- Fletcher Moss Rangers
- –2003: Manchester City

Senior career*
Years	Team	Apps	(Gls)
2003–2004	Manchester City	0	(0)
2003–2004	→ Oldham Athletic (loan)	0	(0)
2004–2008	Carlisle United	131	(0)
2008–2011	Coventry City	131	(0)
2011–2014	Sunderland	19	(0)
2014–2021	Sheffield Wednesday	178	(0)
2022	Queens Park Rangers	6	(0)
2024	Crewe Alexandra	0	(0)
Total		465	(0)

International career
2009–2017	Republic of Ireland	21	(0)
- * Club domestic league appearances and goals as of 16:35, 8 February 2024 (UTC)

Keiren Westwood (born 23 October 1984) is a former professional footballer who played as a goalkeeper. He is now goalkeeping coach for The New Saints. Born in England, he played international football for the Republic of Ireland.

== Club career ==
=== Manchester City ===
Westwood was born in Manchester. He started his career at Fletcher Moss Rangers, he then moved onto Manchester City. He never played a first team game and was released as he was understudy to David James and Nicky Weaver. Weeks before his release he had broken his hand while on loan at Oldham Athletic. He then had unsuccessful trials at Bradford City and Accrington Stanley.

=== Carlisle United ===
Westwood then joined Carlisle United, becoming the understudy to Matt Glennon. Although he played in most cup games, in March 2005, when Glennon was injured, Westwood played some Conference games for Carlisle before being replaced by the fit-again Glennon.

In the 2005–06 season, Glennon left Carlisle and they signed Anthony Williams as his replacement. It looked like Westwood would be the club's number two goalkeeper again, though he finally got his chance to compete for the number one shirt and he succeeded in taking his chance. He started 35 League Two games in their title season and continued to be the club's number one goalkeeper. At the end of the 2007–08 season in League One, Westwood was named in the PFA Team of the Year and also won all of the club's Player of the Season awards.

=== Coventry City ===
On 18 June 2008, Westwood signed a three-year contract with Championship club Coventry City for an undisclosed fee. He was named in the Championship PFA Team of the Year for 2009 in his debut season at the club. He won the club's player of the year award for the 2009–10 season.

=== Sunderland ===
It was confirmed on 22 June 2011 that Westwood would join Sunderland on 1 July on a free transfer. He made his first start for Sunderland on 23 August in the League Cup defeat to Brighton & Hove Albion. His first Premier League appearance came against Aston Villa on 29 October, when he was brought on to replace the injured Simon Mignolet. Westwood later denied former Sunderland striker Darren Bent a goal after the striker was through one on one, with the game level at 1–1. In the following game, away to Manchester United, Westwood made a 'magnificent double save' to deny Wayne Rooney and Patrice Evra, but United won 1–0. Despite Sunderland struggling for results, which saw Steve Bruce sacked on 30 November, Westwood remained in good form. However, after missing Sunderland's 1–0 victory over Manchester City on New Year's Day 2012, Westwood found himself second choice to Mignolet for the remainder of the season.

Westwood remained behind Mignolet in the pecking order at the start of the 2012–13 season, with the Belgian playing in Sunderland's first two league games, although Westwood did play in Sunderland's League Cup victories over Morecambe and Milton Keynes Dons before a 1–0 defeat to Middlesbrough in the fourth round, a game in which Westwood also played. Following Mignolet's departure to Liverpool at the end of the season, Westwood regained his place as Sunderland's first choice keeper, with competition now coming from Vito Mannone.

At the end of 2013–14 season, he was released by the club.

=== Sheffield Wednesday ===
On 7 July 2014, Westwood signed for Championship club Sheffield Wednesday on a two-year deal.

At the end of the 2014–15 season, Westwood was named in the 2014–15 Championship PFA Team of the Year. In September 2015, he extended his contract with the club by two years, up to summer 2018.

In August 2016, Westwood signed a new three-year contract with Wednesday.

In July 2019 he signed a new two-year contract with the club.

Westwood is one of only three players to have won the Sheffield Wednesday F.C. Player of the Year award on multiple occasions, the others being Eric Potts and Barry Bannan. He has received the award twice, at the end of the 2014–15 and 2016–17 seasons.

On 20 May 2021 it was announced that he would leave Sheffield Wednesday at the end of the season, following the expiry of his contract.

=== Queens Park Rangers ===
On 18 March 2022, Westwood joined Queens Park Rangers until the end of the season.

=== Crewe Alexandra ===
On 8 February 2024, Westwood joined EFL League Two side Crewe Alexandra on a short-term contract as cover for injured first choice keeper Tom Booth.

== International career ==
Westwood was eligible to represent his native England and the Republic of Ireland because his grandparents had emigrated to Manchester from Wexford. On 17 May 2009, Westwood was called up by the Republic of Ireland to attend their training camp in Portugal after impressing against Leeds United in a League One match. Three days later he played as a second-half substitute in a practice match against Portuguese club Lagos, replacing Joe Murphy after 66 minutes. On 29 May 2009, Westwood made his first appearance for Ireland in a friendly against Nigeria. He played in the friendly match with South Africa in Thomond Park on 8 September 2009. On 26 March 2011, Westwood made his competitive debut in a European Championship qualifier with Macedonia. He made a crucial save in the closing minutes of the match.

Westwood was part of the Ireland squad for UEFA Euro 2012, although he did not feature in any games. Following the retirement of Shay Given after Euro 2012, Westwood assumed the No.1 position for his country although he later lost this place to David Forde. He made his 15th appearance for Ireland on 2 June 2013, in a 4–0 win over Georgia.

In 2015; following a number of injuries which ruled him out of previous squads, Westwood was recalled to the Starting XI for Ireland's friendly fixture against England in Dublin, Westwood was replaced in the second half by Shay Given with the scores at 0–0.

He played at the 2016 UEFA European Championship, where he helped the national team to reach the knockout phase of the tournament for the first time.

== Coaching career ==
On 27 November 2024, Westwood was appointed head of goalkeeping at The New Saints. He also owns and runs the Keiren Westood Goalkeeper Academy, which began operating in September 2024.

== Career statistics ==
=== Club ===
As of match played 23 April 2022

Appearances and goals by club, season and competition
Club	Season	League			FA Cup		League Cup		Other		Total	
Club	Season	Division	Apps	Goals	Apps	Goals	Apps	Goals	Apps	Goals	Apps	Goals
Manchester City	2003–04	Premier League	0	0	0	0	0	0	0	0	0	0
Oldham Athletic (loan)	2003–04	Second Division	0	0	—		—		—		0	0
Carlisle United	2004–05	Conference National	4	0	0	0	—		3 (Note: Two appearances in Football League Trophy, one in FA Trophy)	0	7	0
Carlisle United	2005–06	League Two	35	0	1	0	1	0	7 (Note: Appearances in Football League Trophy)	0	44	0
Carlisle United	2006–07	League One	46	0	1	0	0	0	0	0	47	0
Carlisle United	2007–08	League One	46	0	2	0	2	0	4 (Note: Two appearances in Football League Trophy, two in League One play-offs)	0	54	0
Carlisle United	Total		131	0	4	0	3	0	14	0	152	0
Coventry City	2008–09	Championship	46	0	3	0	0	0	—		49	0
Coventry City	2009–10	Championship	44	0	2	0	0	0	—		46	0
Coventry City	2010–11	Championship	41	0	2	0	0	0	—		43	0
Coventry City	Total		131	0	7	0	0	0	—		138	0
Sunderland	2011–12	Premier League	9	0	0	0	1	0	—		10	0
Sunderland	2012–13	Premier League	0	0	0	0	3	0	—		3	0
Sunderland	2013–14	Premier League	10	0	0	0	1	0	—		11	0
Sunderland	Total		19	0	0	0	5	0	—		24	0
Sheffield Wednesday	2014–15	Championship	43	0	0	0	0	0	—		43	0
Sheffield Wednesday	2015–16	Championship	34	0	0	0	0	0	3 (Note: Appearances in Championship play-offs)	0	37	0
Sheffield Wednesday	2016–17	Championship	43	0	0	0	0	0	2	0	45	0
Sheffield Wednesday	2017–18	Championship	18	0	0	0	0	0	—		18	0
Sheffield Wednesday	2018–19	Championship	20	0	1	0	0	0	—		20	0
Sheffield Wednesday	2019–20	Championship	14	0	0	0	0	0	—		14	0
Sheffield Wednesday	2020–21	Championship	20	0	0	0	0	0	—		20	0
Sheffield Wednesday	Total		178	0	1	0	0	0	5	0	184	0
Queens Park Rangers	2021–22	Championship	6	0	—		—		—		6	0
Career total			465	0	12	0	8	0	19	0	504	0

=== International ===
Appearances and goals by national team and year
National team	Year	Apps	Goals
Republic of Ireland	2009	3	0
Republic of Ireland	2010	2	0
Republic of Ireland	2011	3	0
Republic of Ireland	2012	6	0
Republic of Ireland	2013	3	0
Republic of Ireland	2015	1	0
Republic of Ireland	2016	1	0
Republic of Ireland	2017	2	0
Total		21	0

== Honours ==
Carlisle United

- Football League Two: 2005–06
- Football League Trophy runner-up: 2005–06

Republic of Ireland

- Nations Cup: 2011

Individual

- PFA Team of the Year: 2007–08 League One, 2008–09 Championship, 2014–15 Championship
- Carlisle United Player of the Year: 2007–08
- Coventry City Player of the Year: 2009–10
- Sheffield Wednesday Player of the Year: 2014–15

== See also ==
- List of Republic of Ireland international footballers born outside the Republic of Ireland
