= Dennis Adeniran =

English footballer (born 1999)

Personal information
- Full name: Dennis Emmanuel Abiodun Bamidele Chijioke Adeniran
- Date of birth: 2 January 1999 (age 27)
- Place of birth: Southwark, England
- Height: 1.83 m (6 ft 0 in)
- Position: Central midfielder

Team information
- Current team: Slough Town
- Number: 29

Youth career
- 2011–2016: Fulham

Senior career*
Years	Team	Apps	(Gls)
2016–2017	Fulham	1	(0)
2017–2021	Everton	0	(0)
2020–2021	→ Wycombe Wanderers (loan)	21	(0)
2021–2023	Sheffield Wednesday	40	(5)
2023–2024	Portimonense	1	(0)
2024	Hapoel Petah Tikva	8	(1)
2024–2025	St Mirren	6	(0)
2025–2026	Barnet	10	(1)
2026–	Slough Town	1	(0)

International career
2015–2016	England U17	13	(1)
2016	England U18	6	(0)
2017	England U19	3	(0)
- * Club domestic league appearances and goals as of 12:31, 30 September 2026 (UTC)

Dennis Emmanuel Abiodun Bamidele Chijioke Adeniran (born 2 January 1999) is an English professional footballer who plays as a central midfielder for National League South club Slough Town.

== Club career ==
=== Fulham ===
On 9 August 2016, Adeniran made his professional debut in a League Cup match against Leyton Orient scoring with a first half header sending Fulham on their way to a 3–2 win. He made his league debut for Fulham as a late substitute against Nottingham Forest on 27 September 2016.

=== Everton ===
On 31 August 2017, Adeniran made a transfer deadline day switch to Everton. It was announced that his contract wouldn't be extended at the end of the 2020–21 season.

==== Wycombe Wanderers (loan) ====
On 25 September 2020, he joined newly promoted Championship side Wycombe Wanderers on a season-long loan deal.

=== Sheffield Wednesday ===
On 10 July 2021, he joined recently relegated EFL League One side Sheffield Wednesday. He made his competitive debut on 1 August 2021, at home to Huddersfield Town, in a game which saw them lose 4–2 on penalties, with Adeniran scoring his. He scored his first Owls goal against Doncaster Rovers on 14 August 2021. He was awarded the fans player of the month for September 2021, after he featured in three of the four games and scored his second goal of the campaign in the 1–1 draw v Ipswich Town. On 29 January 2022, Adeniran ruled himself out for the rest of the season after an operation, which was confirmed by manager Darren Moore. The following season, he would win EFL Cup goal of the round for both the first and second round. Following promotion back to the EFL Championship it was confirmed that Adeniran would be released following the end of his contract.

=== Portimonense ===
In August 2023, Adeniran joined Primeira Liga side Portimonense on a three-year contract.

=== Hapoel Petah Tikva ===
On 31 January 2024, Adeniran joined Israeli Premier League club Hapoel Petah Tikva on a short-term contract until the end of the season, with the option for a further two years.

=== St Mirren ===
He made a return to British football by signing for St Mirren on a one-year deal with year option. He accredited his move to his friendship with Toyosi Olusanya and Jaden Brown.

=== Barnet ===
Adeniran joined Barnet ahead of the 2025-26 season. After one goal in fourteen appearances, he was not retained at the end of the season.

=== Slough Town ===
Adeniran signed for Slough Town on 29 September 2026.

== International career ==
Adeniran represented England under-17 at the 2016 U17 Euros.

== Career statistics ==
As of end of 2025-26 season

Appearances and goals by club, season and competition
Club	Season	League			National cup		League cup		Other		Total	
Club	Season	Division	Apps	Goals	Apps	Goals	Apps	Goals	Apps	Goals	Apps	Goals
Fulham	2016–17	Championship	1	0	1	0	3	1	—		5	1
Fulham	Total		1	0	1	0	3	1	0	0	5	1
Everton U21	2017–18	—			—		—		2 (Note: Appearances in EFL Trophy)	1	2	1
Everton U21	2018–19	—			—		—		3	0	3	0
Everton U21	2019–20	—			—		—		3	0	3	0
Everton U21	2020–21	—			—		—		0	0	0	0
Everton U21	Total		0	0	0	0	0	0	8	1	8	1
Wycombe Wanderers (loan)	2020–21	Championship	21	0	1	0	0	0	—		22	0
Sheffield Wednesday	2021–22	League One	18	3	2	0	1	0	2	0	23	3
Sheffield Wednesday	2022–23	League One	22	2	3	0	2	2	1 (Note: Appearance(s) in League One Play-offs)	0	28	4
Sheffield Wednesday	Total		40	5	5	0	3	2	3	0	51	7
Portimonense	2023–24	Primeira Liga	1	0	0	0	0	0	—		1	0
Hapoel Petah Tikva	2023–24	Israeli Premier League	8	1	2	0	0	0	—		10	1
St Mirren	2024–25	Scottish Premiership	6	0	0	0	0	0	4 (Note: Appearance(s) in UEFA Conference League)	0	10	0
Barnet	2025–26	League Two	10	1	0	0	1	0	3	0	14	1
Career total			87	7	9	0	7	3	18	1	121	11

== Honours ==
Everton U23s

- Premier League Cup: 2018–19

Sheffield Wednesday

- EFL League One play-offs: 2023
