= Sam Hutchinson =

English footballer (born 1989)

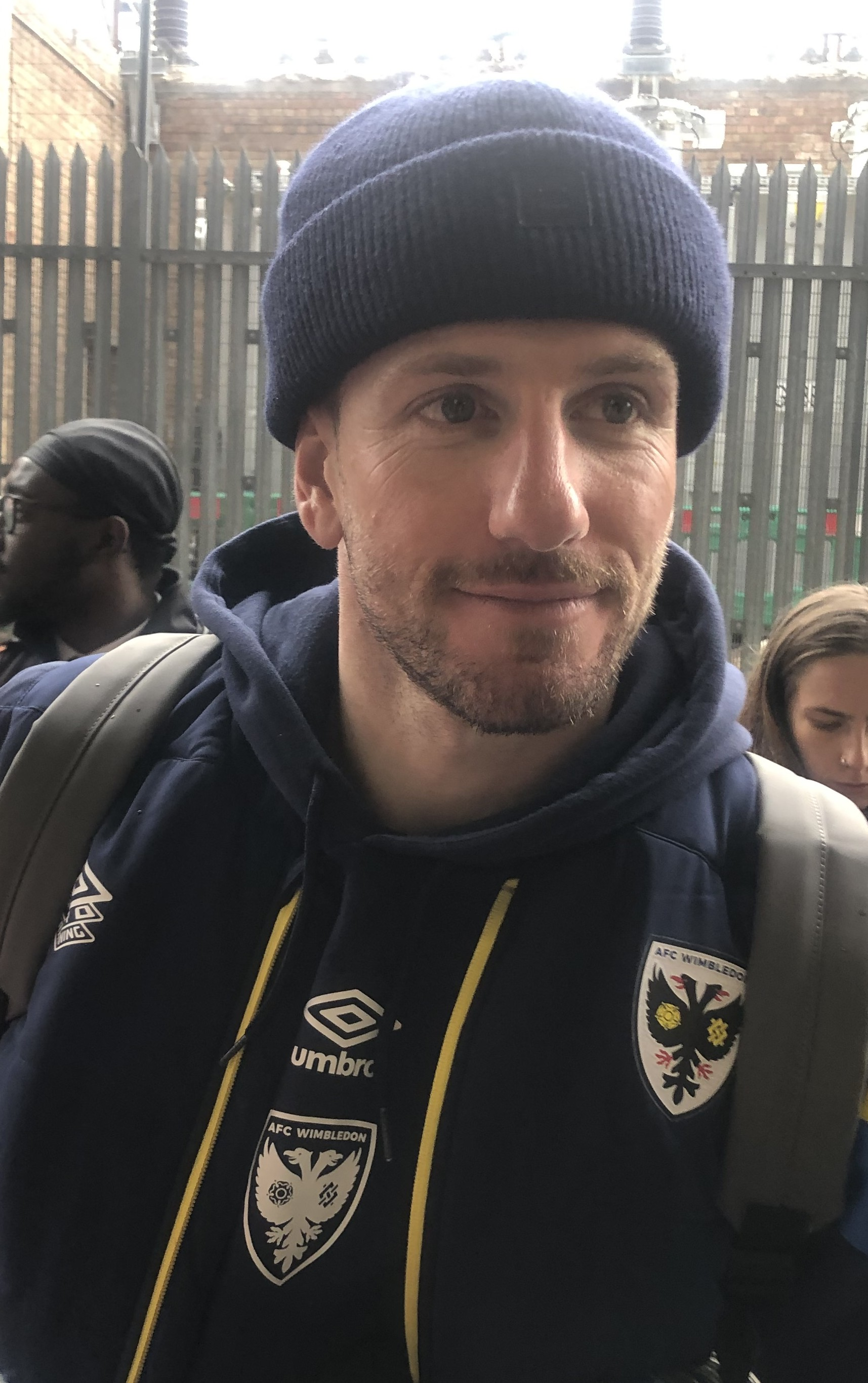
- Hutchinson in 2025.

Personal information
- Full name: Samuel Edward Hutchinson
- Date of birth: 3 August 1989 (age 37)
- Place of birth: Windsor, England
- Height: 6 ft 0 in (1.82 m)
- Positions: Centre-back; defensive midfielder

Team information
- Current team: Farnham Town
- Number: 27

Youth career
- 1997–2007: Chelsea

Senior career*
Years	Team	Apps	(Gls)
2007–2010	Chelsea	3	(0)
2011–2014	Chelsea	2	(0)
2012–2013	→ Nottingham Forest (loan)	9	(1)
2013–2014	→ Vitesse (loan)	1	(0)
2014	→ Sheffield Wednesday (loan)	10	(1)
2014–2020	Sheffield Wednesday	133	(3)
2020	Pafos	5	(0)
2021–2022	Sheffield Wednesday	50	(2)
2022–2024	Reading	23	(0)
2024–2026	AFC Wimbledon	22	(1)
2026–	Farnham Town	15	(0)

International career
2006–2007	England U18	1	(0)
2007–2009	England U19	4	(0)
- * Club domestic league appearances and goals as of 14:28, 20 November 2026 (UTC)

Samuel Edward Hutchinson (born 3 August 1989) is an English professional footballer who plays as a centre-back or defensive midfielder for National League South side Farnham Town.

== Early and personal life ==
Hutchinson was born in Windsor, Berkshire, in England. He is the son of Eddie Hutchinson, who had played for Chelsea's youth team, before a career in non-League football.

As of June 2019, Hutchinson had one daughter and two sons with his wife, Jennifer.

== Club career ==
=== Chelsea ===
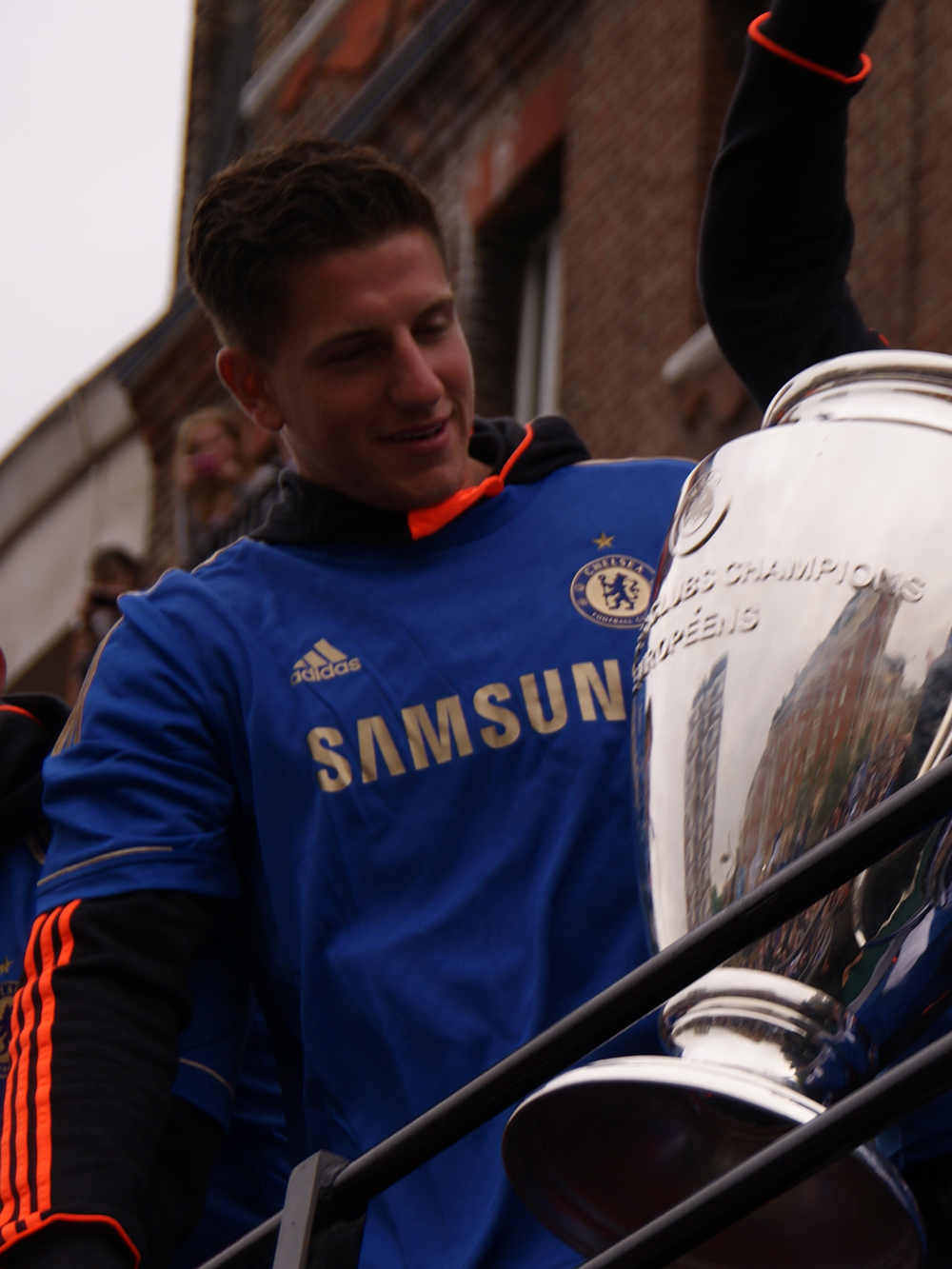
Hutchinson in 2012.

Hutchinson joined the Chelsea Academy at the age of seven, and made his senior debut in May 2007, at the age of 17. Hutchinson signed a new four-year contract in August 2007. Later that month, Plymouth Argyle manager Ian Holloway announced his interest in signing Hutchinson on loan. Hutchinson retired from professional football at the age of 21 in August 2010, due to a recurring knee injury. He subsequently suffered from depression.

In December 2011 he came out of retirement and signed a new one-and-a-half-year contract with Chelsea following a "significant improvement" with his knee. He made his return as a substitute on 29 April in a 6–1 win over Queens Park Rangers. In August 2012, Hutchinson joined Nottingham Forest on a season-long loan deal.

==== Loan to Nottingham Forest ====
On 16 August 2012, Hutchinson signed on loan for Football League Championship side Nottingham Forest. He made his debut on 21 August, in a 1–1 draw away to Huddersfield Town. He scored on his home debut in a 2–1 win against Charlton Athletic on 1 September 2012. Following another knee injury, Hutchinson went back to Chelsea in September for an injection that was intended to clear up the problem by the October international break; the treatment did not work and he was still out through mid-December, missing fifteen games. After a long break, Hutchinson returned to training with Forest at the beginning of the March 2013.

==== Loan to Vitesse ====
On 2 September 2013, Hutchinson joined Dutch club Vitesse Arnhem on a season-long loan. On 31 October he made his debut for the club in a league cup game against VV Noordwijk which Vitesse won 5–0. Hutchinson made his league debut on 2 November in a 1–0 win over Ajax coming on as a late substitute. On 2 January 2014 it was announced that he was recalled from his loan spell.

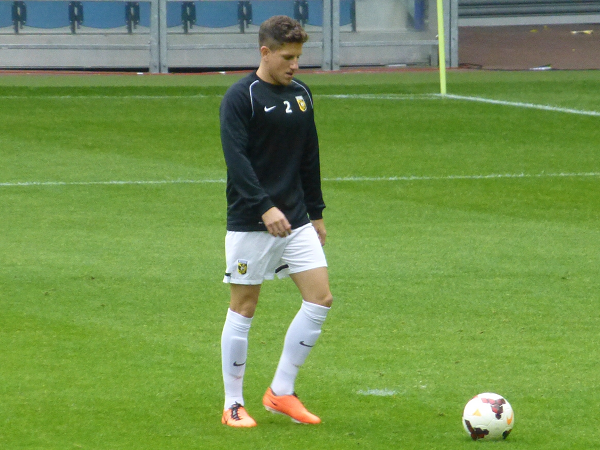
Hutchinson warming up for Vitesse in October 2013.

=== Sheffield Wednesday ===
On 14 February 2014, Hutchinson joined Championship side Sheffield Wednesday on a 28-day loan. On 14 March 2014, Hutchinson extended his loan with the "Owls" until 9 April 2014.

On 23 May 2014, Chelsea released Hutchinson and made him available for free transfer.

Hutchinson signed a permanent two-year contract with Sheffield Wednesday, on 8 July 2014. In the 2016–17 season, Hutchinson picked up three Player of the Month awards, before signing a new two-and-a-half-year contract in January 2017.

On 24 June 2020, it was announced that he would leave the club when his contract expired on 30 June 2020.

=== Pafos ===
On 21 September 2020, following his release from Sheffield Wednesday, Hutchinson joined Cypriot club Pafos. After 7 appearances in all competitions, it was announced that his contract has been terminated on 26 December 2020, following links that he could be about to return to his old club Sheffield Wednesday.

=== Return to Sheffield Wednesday ===
After speculation linking him with a return to Sheffield Wednesday, he signed for the club on 25 January 2021. He would make his third debut against Coventry City a few days later. His first goal on his return to the club would be against Derby County on the final day of the season, but the result would eventually see Sheffield Wednesday relegated back to League One. After playing 22 games and only missing one match on his return to the club, it was reported that he had triggered a one-year option in his contract due to the number of games he had played, which was confirmed by the club on 20 May 2021. On 21 May 2022, it was confirmed he would leave the club following the expiration of his contract.

=== Reading ===
Hutchinson had a trial with Championship club Reading in July 2022, training with the first team and playing in a few pre-season friendlies. After impressing manager Paul Ince, Hutchinson signed a two-year contract on 20 July 2022, which ran till June 2024. He was released by Reading at the end of the 2023–24 season.

=== AFC Wimbledon ===
On 10 December 2024, Hutchinson joined League Two side AFC Wimbledon on a one-month deal, lasting until 8 January 2025, which was extended until the end of the 2024-25 season.

On 13 May 2025, the club announced the player had undergone heart surgery after being taken ill in the wake of a game on 3 May. The team coach had to be diverted so Hutchinson could go to hospital. Hutchinson later revealed that he had had a heart attack.

On 25 June 2025, Hutchinson signed a one-season extension to his contract for the forthcoming League One season.

He was released at the end of the 2025–26 season.

=== Farnham Town ===
On 21 July 2026, following his departure from AFC Wimbledon, Hutchinson signed a two-year contract with newly promoted National League South club Farnham Town. He said he was enjoying playing part-time football, due to his previous health concerns.

== International career ==
Hutchinson played for England at under-18 and under-19 youth international level; he missed the 2008 UEFA European Under-19 Football Championship tournament through injury, and would have been the country's captain. Hutchinson was called up to the England under-21 squad on 1 October 2009 for the European Championship qualifier against Macedonia, but withdrew injured.

== Style of play ==
Hutchinson broke through as a defender. His manager at Forest, Sean O'Driscoll, remarked that Hutchinson "can play right-back or right centre-half", adding "he's a bit John Terry-esque". However, during his time at Sheffield Wednesday, he evolved into "an old-fashioned midfielder who marauds into tackles"; Hutchinson believes that since the recovery from his knee injury, he has become "even more full-blooded". After his trio of Player of the Month accolades in 2016–17, the Guardian referred to him as "probably Wednesday's best player [...] and one of the best midfielders in the Championship".

== Career statistics ==
As of 14 November 2026

Appearances and goals by club, season and competition
Club	Season	League			National Cup (Note: Includes FA Cup, KNVB Cup, Cypriot Cup)		League Cup (Note: Includes EFL Cup)		Other		Total	
Club	Season	Division	Apps	Goals	Apps	Goals	Apps	Goals	Apps	Goals	Apps	Goals
Chelsea	2006–07	Premier League	1	0	0	0	0	0	0	0	1	0
Chelsea	2007–08	Premier League	0	0	0	0	0	0	0	0	0	0
Chelsea	2008–09	Premier League	0	0	0	0	0	0	0	0	0	0
Chelsea	2009–10	Premier League	2	0	0	0	1	0	0	0	3	0
Chelsea	Total		3	0	0	0	1	0	0	0	4	0
Chelsea	2011–12	Premier League	2	0	0	0	0	0	0	0	2	0
Chelsea	2012–13	Premier League	0	0	0	0	0	0	0	0	0	0
Chelsea	2013–14	Premier League	0	0	0	0	0	0	0	0	0	0
Chelsea	Total		2	0	0	0	0	0	0	0	2	0
Nottingham Forest (loan)	2012–13	Championship	9	1	0	0	0	0	–		9	1
Vitesse (loan)	2013–14	Eredivisie	1	0	2	0	–		0	0	3	0
Sheffield Wednesday (loan)	2013–14	Championship	10	1	0	0	0	0	–		10	1
Sheffield Wednesday	2014–15	Championship	20	0	0	0	0	0	–		20	0
Sheffield Wednesday	2015–16	Championship	25	0	0	0	3	1	2 (Note: Appearance(s) in the Championship play-offs)	0	30	1
Sheffield Wednesday	2016–17	Championship	33	2	0	0	0	0	1	0	34	2
Sheffield Wednesday	2017–18	Championship	8	0	0	0	1	1	–		9	1
Sheffield Wednesday	2018–19	Championship	24	0	2	0	1	0	–		27	0
Sheffield Wednesday	2019–20	Championship	23	1	1	0	0	0	–		24	1
Sheffield Wednesday	Total		133	3	3	0	5	2	3	0	144	5
Pafos	2020–21	Cypriot First Division	5	0	0	0	–		–		5	0
Sheffield Wednesday	2020–21	Championship	22	1	0	0	0	0	–		22	1
Sheffield Wednesday	2021–22	League One	28	1	0	1	0	0	2 (Note: Appearances in the League One Play-offs.)	0	31	1
Sheffield Wednesday	Total		50	2	0	0	1	0	2	0	53	2
Reading	2022–23	Championship	11	0	1	0	0	0	–		12	0
Reading	2023–24	League One	12	0	1	0	0	0	1 (Note: Appearance(s) in the EFL Trophy)	0	14	0
Reading	Total		23	0	2	0	0	0	1	0	26	0
AFC Wimbledon	2024–25	League Two	18	1	0	0	0	0	0	0	18	1
AFC Wimbledon	2025–26	League One	4	0	0	0	0	0	1	0	5	0
AFC Wimbledon	Total		22	1	0	0	0	0	1	0	23	1
Farnham Town	2026–27	National League South	15	0	2	0	–		1 (Note: Appearance(s) in the FA Trophy)	0	18	0
Career total			273	8	9	0	7	2	8	0	297	10

== Honours ==
=== AFC Wimbledon ===
- EFL League Two playoffs: 2025
