= 2021–22 Sheffield Wednesday F.C. season =

English football club season

Sheffield Wednesday
2021–22 season
- Chairman: Dejphon Chansiri
- Manager: Darren Moore
- Stadium: Hillsborough, Owlerton
- League One: 4th
- Play-offs: Semi final (vs. Sunderland)
- FA Cup: First round (vs. Plymouth Argyle)
- EFL Cup: First round (vs. Huddersfield Town)
- EFL Trophy: Second round (vs. Hartlepool United)
- Top goalscorer: League: Lee Gregory (16 goals); All: Lee Gregory (17 goals)
- Highest home attendance: 33,394 (vs Portsmouth; League One)
- Lowest home attendance: 5,433 (vs Harrogate Town; EFL Trophy)
- Average home league attendance: 22,470
- Biggest win: 6–0 (vs Cambridge United; League One)
- Biggest defeat: 0–5 (vs. Sunderland; League One)
| Home colours | Away colours |

The 2021–22 season is Sheffield Wednesday's first season in League One since the 2011–12 season, following their relegation from the Championship. The season covers the period from 1 July 2021 to 30 June 2022.

== Season overview ==
=== July ===
On 6 July 2021, the club published their annual accounts for the year ending 31 July 2020.

On 9 July, the club were hit with a suspended 6 point penalty, which will take effect if they fail to pay their players wages on time before June 30, 2022. If the penalty hasn't been breached before 31 December 2021, the penalty would be reduced to a suspended 3 points.

On 14 July, the club introduced their new first team scholars for the 2021–22; Pierce Charles, Jack Hall, Kamil Maciag, Tafadzwa Tapudzai, Cian Flannery, Bailey Cadamarteri, Josh Chapman, Danai Rhule, Rio Shipston, Mackenzie Maltby, Sean Fusire, Joey Phuthi and Jake Bradford.

On 20 July, manager Darren Moore confirmed that first-team coach Paul Williams had left the club for personal reasons.

On 23 July, the club unveiled their new kits for the 2021–22 season.

On 31 July, the club announced their first-team squad numbers for the 2021–22 season.

=== August ===
On 6 August, Darren Moore bolstered his coaching staff with the appointment of Simon Ireland as a first team coach.

On 7 August, Darren Moore said that his old assistant manager Wayne Jacobs was currently helping out at the club in a coaching capacity, but it was not an appointment.

On 13 August, Guiseley announced a loan move for goalkeeper Luke Jackson, but the deal would be cancelled the same day due to the keeper picking up an injury.

On 27 August, the game against Sunderland was postponed due to the Black Cats having hit the criteria for players on international duty.

=== October ===
On 8 October, Darren Moore confirmed that the club had appointed Rob Lee to his backroom staff.

=== November ===
On 2 November, Darren Moore confirmed that Nathaniel Mendez-Laing was currently training with the squad.

=== December ===
On 16 December, their upcoming game against Accrington Stanley was postponed due to an outbreak of COVID-19 at the club.

On 22 December, their boxing day tie against Burton Albion was also postponed due to a COVID-19 outbreak both teams squads.

=== January ===
On 7 January, U23 coach Lee Bullen was appointed manager of Scottish Championship side Ayr United.

On 13 January, Neil Thompson was appointed the new manager of the U23 side.

=== February ===
On 1 February, Darren Moore was absent from the game against Morecambe after testing positive for COVID-19.

On 16 February, the rearranged match against Accrington Stanley was postponed due to a waterlogged pitch.

On 21 February, their match against Fleetwood Town was postponed following storm damage.

=== March ===
On 3 March, Darren Moore confirmed that Wayne Jacobs had joined the club as an assistant manager.

=== April ===
On 4 April, Barry Bannan was awarded the Owls’ Community Player of the Year award.

On 8 April, the club announced BLU Steel energy drinks as a new back of shirt sponsor.

On 20 April, Liam Palmer was awarded the Wise Old Owls Player of the Season award.

=== May ===
On 3 May, the club published its annual accounts for the year ending July 2021.

== Pre-season ==
As of 27 May, Wednesday announced one pre-season friendly against Celtic. On 2 July 2021, the remainder of their pre-season was announced, with games against, Chester, Alfreton Town, Barnsley, West Bromwich Albion, Wrexham and Port Vale all confirmed. On 16 July, they announced two more friendlies for a Sheffield Wednesday XI side against, Ossett United and Stocksbridge Park Steels.

| 7 July 2021 Friendly | Celtic | 3–1 | Sheffield Wednesday | Newport |
| 15:00 BST | Ajeti 31'; Moffat 56'; Édouard 90' | Report | Windass 3' | Stadium: Dragon Park; Attendance: 0 (Played behind closed doors) |

| 10 July 2021 Friendly | Chester | 0–2 | Sheffield Wednesday | Chester |
| 15:00 BST | | Report | Windass 29'; Adedoyin 52' | Stadium: Deva Stadium; Attendance: 721 |

| 13 July 2021 Friendly | Alfreton Town | 0–1 | Sheffield Wednesday | Alfreton |
| 19:30 BST | | Report | Green 83' | Stadium: The Impact Arena |

| 17 July 2021 Friendly | Barnsley | 2–0 | Sheffield Wednesday | Barnsley |
| 12:00 BST | Williams 21'; Oduor 69' | Report | | Stadium: Oakwell Training Ground; Attendance: 0 (Played behind closed doors) |

| 20 July 2021 Friendly | West Bromwich Albion | 2–0 | Sheffield Wednesday | Walsall |
| 14:00 BST | Phillips 5', 38' | Report | | Stadium: West Bromwich Albion Training Ground; Attendance: 0 (Played behind closed doors) |

| 20 July 2021 Friendly | Ossett United | 1–1 | Sheffield Wednesday XI | Ossett |
| 19:30 BST | Potts | | Trialist | Stadium: Ingfield Stadium; Attendance: 888; Referee: Ian Johnston |

| 24 July 2021 Friendly | Sheffield Wednesday | Cancelled | Wrexham | Sheffield |
| 13:00 BST | | | | Stadium: Middlewood Road |
Note: Match was cancelled due to COVID cases in the Wrexham camp.

| 27 July 2021 Friendly | Port Vale | 1–2 | Sheffield Wednesday | Stoke-on-Trent |
| 19:30 BST | Conlon 31' | Report | Iorfa 24'; Dele-Bashiru 80' | Stadium: Vale Park; Attendance: 2,708; Referee: Rob Lewis |

| 3 August 2021 Friendly | Stocksbridge Park Steels | 2–3 | Sheffield Wednesday XI | Stocksbridge, Sheffield |
| 19:45 BST | Agbonotohoma (o.g.); Lumsden | Report | Zottos; Bonnington; Davidson | Stadium: Eco-Power Stadium; Referee: Lee Hible |

== Competitions ==
=== League One ===
==== League table ====
| Pos | Team | Pld | W | D | L | GF | GA | GD | Pts | Promotion, qualification or relegation |
|---|---|---|---|---|---|---|---|---|---|---|
| 1 | Wigan Athletic (C, P) | 46 | 27 | 11 | 8 | 82 | 44 | +38 | 92 | Promotion to EFL Championship |
| 2 | Rotherham United (P) | 46 | 27 | 9 | 10 | 70 | 33 | +37 | 90 | Promotion to EFL Championship |
| 3 | Milton Keynes Dons | 46 | 26 | 11 | 9 | 78 | 44 | +34 | 89 | Qualification for League One play-offs |
| 4 | Sheffield Wednesday | 46 | 24 | 13 | 9 | 78 | 50 | +28 | 85 | Qualification for League One play-offs |
| 5 | Sunderland (O, P) | 46 | 24 | 12 | 10 | 79 | 53 | +26 | 84 | Qualification for League One play-offs |
| 6 | Wycombe Wanderers | 46 | 23 | 14 | 9 | 75 | 51 | +24 | 83 | Qualification for League One play-offs |
| 7 | Plymouth Argyle | 46 | 23 | 11 | 12 | 68 | 48 | +20 | 80 | |
| 8 | Oxford United | 46 | 22 | 10 | 14 | 82 | 59 | +23 | 76 | |

Source: EFL Official Website
Rules for classification: 1) Points; 2) Goal difference; 3) Number of goals scored; 4) Head-to-head results; 5) Wins; 6) Away goals; 7) Penalty points based on yellow and red cards received excluding the last four games of the season (sec 9.5); 8) 12-point sending off offences; 9) If the tie affects the automatic promotion or relegation places, a play-off game or games would be held between the two tied teams
(C) Champions; (O) Play-off winners; (P) Promoted

==== Results summary ====
| Overall | | | | | | | | Home | | | | | | Away | | | | | |
| Pld | W | D | L | GF | GA | GD | Pts | W | D | L | GF | GA | GD | W | D | L | GF | GA | GD |
|---|---|---|---|---|---|---|---|---|---|---|---|---|---|---|---|---|---|---|---|
| 46 | 24 | 13 | 9 | 78 | 50 | +28 | 85 | 16 | 5 | 2 | 48 | 18 | +30 | 8 | 8 | 7 | 30 | 32 | −2 |

Last updated: 30 April 2022.

==== Results by matchday ====
| Matchday | 1 | 2 | 3 | 4 | 5 | 6 | 7 | 8 | 9 | 10 | 11 | 12 | 13 | 14 | 15 | 16 | 17 | 18 | 19 | 20 | 21 | 22 | 23 | 24 | 25 | 26 | 27 | 28 | 29 | 30 | 31 | 32 | 33 | 34 | 35 | 36 | 37 | 38 | 39 | 40 | 41 | 42 | 43 | 44 | 45 | 46 |
|---|---|---|---|---|---|---|---|---|---|---|---|---|---|---|---|---|---|---|---|---|---|---|---|---|---|---|---|---|---|---|---|---|---|---|---|---|---|---|---|---|---|---|---|---|---|---|
| Ground | A | H | H | A | A | A | H | A | A | H | H | A | A | H | A | H | H | A | H | H | A | A | A | A | H | A | H | H | A | H | H | A | H | H | A | H | H | A | H | H | A | A | H | A | A | H |
| Result | D | W | W | W | L | L | D | D | W | L | W | D | D | D | D | W | D | W | W | D | D | W | L | L | W | L | W | W | W | W | L | W | W | W | L | W | D | D | W | W | D | W | W | L | W | W |
| Position | 18 | 6 | 4 | 1 | 2 | 12 | 12 | 11 | 9 | 12 | 9 | 7 | 9 | 9 | 8 | 8 | 8 | 7 | 5 | 7 | 8 | 7 | 8 | 9 | 8 | 8 | 8 | 8 | 7 | 7 | 8 | 8 | 6 | 5 | 6 | 7 | 7 | 7 | 6 | 5 | 5 | 5 | 4 | 7 | 4 | 4 |

Updated to match(es) played on 30 April 2022. Source: Statto.com
A = Away; H = Home; W = Win; D = Draw; L = Loss

==== Matches ====
On Thursday, 24 June 2021, the EFL League One fixtures were revealed.

| 7 August 2021 1 | Charlton Athletic | 0–0 | Sheffield Wednesday | Charlton |
| 17:30 BST | Matthews (yellow card) 33' | Report | Hutchinson (yellow card) 43'; Bannan (yellow card) 61'; Iorfa (yellow card) 84' | Stadium: The Valley; Attendance: 17,639; Referee: Will Finnie |
Note: Live on Sky Sports

| 14 August 2021 2 | Sheffield Wednesday | 2–0 | Doncaster Rovers | Owlerton, Sheffield |
| 15:00 BST | Bannan 72'; Adeniran 75' | Report | Rowe (yellow card) 22'; Knoyle (yellow card) 40'; Galbraith (yellow card) 72'; Bogle (penalty missed) 88' | Stadium: Hillsborough; Attendance: 24,738; Referee: Ross Joyce |

| 17 August 2021 3 | Sheffield Wednesday | 1–0 | Fleetwood Town | Owlerton, Sheffield |
| 19:45 BST | Gregory 15'; Byers (yellow card) 17'; Johnson (yellow card) 34'; Bannan (yellow card) 69'; Iorfa (yellow card) 87' | Report | Halliday (yellow card) 23'; Rossiter (yellow card) 35'; Morton (yellow card) 49'; Holgate (yellow card) 83'; Biggins (yellow card) 90+1' | Stadium: Hillsborough; Attendance: 21,130; Referee: Seb Stockbridge |

| 21 August 2021 4 | Rotherham United | 0–2 | Sheffield Wednesday | Rotherham |
| 13:00 BST | Sadlier (penalty missed) 45+3'; Rathbone (yellow card) 66' | Report | Wing (yellow card) 17'; Kamberi 50'; Peacock-Farrell (yellow card) 74'; Gregory 77'; Hunt (yellow card) 88'; Adeniran (yellow card) 90+4' | Stadium: AESSEAL New York Stadium; Attendance: 11,522; Referee: Marc Edwards |

| 28 August 2021 5 | Morecambe | 1–0 | Sheffield Wednesday | Morecambe |
| 15:00 BST | McLoughlin (yellow card) 12'; Cooney (yellow card) 34'; Adeniran 63' (o.g.) | Report | Byers (yellow card) 5'; Brown (yellow card) 21' | Stadium: Mazuma Stadium; Attendance: 5,481; Referee: Anthony Backhouse |

| 11 September 2021 6 | Plymouth Argyle | 3–0 | Sheffield Wednesday | Plymouth |
| 15:00 BST | Edwards 7'; Scarr 40'; Houghton (yellow card) 80'; Law 90+7' | Report | Hutchinson (yellow card) 25'; Byers (yellow card) 40'; Sow (yellow card) 55'; Gregory (yellow card) 80' | Stadium: Home Park; Attendance: 13,448; Referee: Ben Speedie |

| 18 September 2021 7 | Sheffield Wednesday | 1–1 | Shrewsbury Town | Owlerton, Sheffield |
| 15:00 BST | Berahino 6'; Bannan (penalty missed) 23'; Dunkley (yellow card) 55' | Report | Bowman 37'; Vela (yellow card) 53'; Leahy (yellow card) 54' | Stadium: Hillsborough; Attendance: 21,976; Referee: Ben Toner |

| 25 September 2021 8 | Ipswich Town | 1–1 | Sheffield Wednesday | Ipswich |
| 15:00 BST | El Mizouni (yellow card) 79'; Chaplin 90'; Fraser (yellow card) 90+4' | Report | Adeniran 26' | Stadium: Portman Road; Attendance: 21,338; Referee: Andy Davies |

| 28 September 2021 9 | Wigan Athletic | 1–2 | Sheffield Wednesday | Wigan |
| 19:45 BST | Whatmough (yellow card) 15'; Power (yellow card) 52'; Wyke 82' (pen.) | Report | Power 23' (o.g.); Paterson (yellow card) 39', (goal) 60'; Dunkley (yellow card) 87'; Peacock-Farrell (yellow card) 90+2' | Stadium: DW Stadium; Attendance: 11,884; Referee: Sam Barrott |

| 2 October 2021 10 | Sheffield Wednesday | 1–2 | Oxford United | Owlerton, Sheffield |
| 15:00 BST | Paterson (yellow card) 61', (goal) 73'; Palmer (yellow card) 85' | Report | Brannagan 12'; Seddon (yellow card) 61'; Rodríguez (yellow card) 80'; Henry 90+3' | Stadium: Hillsborough; Attendance: 22,060; Referee: Andy Haines |

| 9 October 2021 11 | Sheffield Wednesday | 1–0 | Bolton Wanderers | Owlerton, Sheffield |
| 15:00 BST | Iorfa (yellow card) 28'; Gregory 66'; Shodipo (yellow card) 77' | Report | Jones (yellow card) 58'; Afolayan (yellow card) 65' | Stadium: Hillsborough; Attendance: 23,692; Referee: David Rock |

| 16 October 2021 12 | AFC Wimbledon | 2–2 | Sheffield Wednesday | Wimbledon |
| 15:00 BST | Guinness-Walker 67'; Rudoni 85' | Report | Gregory 13', 61' (pen.); Dunkley (yellow card) 27'; Brown (yellow card) 90+4' | Stadium: The Cherry Red Records Stadium; Attendance: 8,224; Referee: Chris Sarginson |

| 19 October 2021 13 | Cambridge United | 1–1 | Sheffield Wednesday | Cambridge |
| 19:45 BST | Williams 20'; Iredale (yellow card) 67' | Report | Paterson (yellow card) 45'; Dele-Bashiru 80'; Palmer (yellow card) 90+2' | Stadium: Abbey Stadium; Attendance: 7,342; Referee: Scott Oldham |

| 23 October 2021 14 | Sheffield Wednesday | 1–1 | Lincoln City | Owlerton, Sheffield |
| 15:00 BST | Adeniran 55' | Report | McGrandles (yellow card) 53'; Montsma 80' | Stadium: Hillsborough; Attendance: 23,521; Referee: Martin Coy |

| 30 October 2021 15 | Cheltenham Town | 2–2 | Sheffield Wednesday | Cheltenham |
| 15:00 BST | Vassell 14', (yellow card) 75'; Blair 90+1'; May (yellow card) 90+3' | Report | Bannan (yellow card) 32'; Dunkley 65'; Blair 82' (o.g.); Johnson (yellow card) 90+3' | Stadium: Jonny-Rocks Stadium; Attendance: 5,582; Referee: Charles Breakspear |

| 2 November 2021 16 | Sheffield Wednesday | 3–0 | Sunderland | Owlerton, Sheffield |
| 19:45 BST | Corbeanu 11'; Kamberi 39'; Gregory 53'; Johnson (yellow card) 58'; Adeniran (yellow card) 87' | Report | | Stadium: Hillsborough; Attendance: 23,731; Referee: Craig Hicks |

| 13 November 2021 17 | Sheffield Wednesday | 1–1 | Gillingham | Owlerton, Sheffield |
| 15:00 GMT | Kamberi 75'; Johnson (yellow card) 81' | Report | Oliver 22'; Phillips (yellow card) 30'; Akinde (yellow card) 90+6' | Stadium: Hillsborough; Attendance: 20,593; Referee: John Busby |

| 20 November 2021 18 | Accrington Stanley | 2–3 | Sheffield Wednesday | Accrington |
| 15:00 GMT | Mansell 33'; Coyle (yellow card) 45'; Mumbongo 53'; O'Sullivan (yellow card) 90+5' | Report | Luongo (yellow card) 3'; Dunkley 13'; Corbeanu 20'; Kamberi 22'; Paterson (yellow card) 44' | Stadium: Wham Stadium; Attendance: 4,627; Referee: Paul Howard |

| 23 November 2021 19 | Sheffield Wednesday | 2–1 | Milton Keynes Dons | Owlerton, Sheffield |
| 19:45 GMT | Palmer (yellow card) 5'; Gregory 83'; Windass 90+3' | Report | Baldwin (yellow card) 2'; Twine 47'; Kioso (yellow card) 90+1' | Stadium: Hillsborough; Attendance: 18,581; Referee: Robert Madley |

| 27 November 2021 20 | Sheffield Wednesday | 2–2 | Wycombe Wanderers | Owlerton, Sheffield |
| 15:00 GMT | Luongo (yellow card) 24'; Shodipo 45+9' (yellow card) 68'; Windass 50' | Report | Mehmeti 23'; Obita 65'; Stewart (yellow card) 68'; Akinfenwa (yellow card) 90+3' | Stadium: Hillsborough; Attendance: 20,761; Referee: Darren Drysdale |

| 7 December 2021 21 | Portsmouth | 0–0 | Sheffield Wednesday | Milton, Portsmouth |
| 19:45 GMT | Hackett-Fairchild (yellow card) 50' | Report | Paterson (yellow card) 4'; Luongo (red card) 69' | Stadium: Fratton Park; Attendance: 16,472; Referee: Sam Purkiss |
Note: Live on Sky Sports

| 11 December 2021 22 | Crewe Alexandra | 0–2 | Sheffield Wednesday | Crewe |
| 15:00 GMT | Robertson (yellow card) 16'; Porter (penalty missed) 45+2' | Report | Bannan 27', (yellow card) 28'; Corbeanu (yellow card) 39'; Gregory 47' | Stadium: Gresty Road; Attendance: 6,325; Referee: Lee Swabey |

| 30 December 2021 23 | Sunderland | 5–0 | Sheffield Wednesday | Sunderland |
| 19:45 GMT | Stewart 12', 36', 58'; Neil (yellow card) 24'; Doyle 40'; Embleton (yellow card) 67'; Mbunga-Kimpioka 75' | Report | Bannan (yellow card) 67' | Stadium: Stadium of Light; Attendance: 34,652; Referee: Ben Toner |

| 2 January 2022 24 | Shrewsbury Town | 1–0 | Sheffield Wednesday | Shrewsbury |
| 15:00 GMT | Pennington 45+1'; Vela (yellow card) 84'; Daniels (yellow card) 90+2' | Report | Adeniran (yellow card) 37'; Hutchinson (yellow card) 90+3' | Stadium: Montgomery Waters Meadow; Attendance: 8,270; Referee: Marc Edwards |

| 15 January 2022 25 | Sheffield Wednesday | 4–2 | Plymouth Argyle | Owlerton, Sheffield |
| 19:45 GMT | Sow 19'; Mendez-Laing 40'; Luongo (yellow card) 56'; Hutchinson 79'; Windass 84'; Hunt (yellow card) 88' | Report | Randell 46'; Johnson 84' (o.g.); Broom (yellow card) 90+6' | Stadium: Hillsborough; Attendance: 20,872; Referee: Christopher Pollard |

| 22 January 2022 26 | Oxford United | 3–2 | Sheffield Wednesday | Littlemore |
| 15:00 GMT | Taylor 45+1', (yellow card) 45+4', (goal) 62'; Winnall 84' | Report | Bannan 7', (yellow card) 80'; Hunt (yellow card) 14'; Windass 60' | Stadium: The Kassam Stadium; Attendance: 10,071; Referee: Alan Young |

| 29 January 2022 27 | Sheffield Wednesday | 1–0 | Ipswich Town | Owlerton, Sheffield |
| 15:00 GMT | Johnson 6'; Dean (yellow card) 26' | Report | | Stadium: Hillsborough Stadium; Attendance: 23,517; Referee: Darren Bond |

| 1 February 2022 28 | Sheffield Wednesday | 2–0 | Morecambe | Owlerton, Sheffield |
| 19:45 GMT | Byers 55'; Hutchinson (yellow card) 83'; Mendez-Laing 90+1' | Report | McLaughlin (yellow card) 83' | Stadium: Hillsborough Stadium; Attendance: 19,261; Referee: Ollie Yates |

| 5 February 2022 29 | Burton Albion | 0–2 | Sheffield Wednesday | Burton upon Trent |
| 15:00 GMT | Garratt (yellow card) 72'; Borthwick-Jackson (yellow card) 90+1'; Powell (yellow card) 90+4' | Report | Byers 33'; Luongo (yellow card) 71'; Sow 81' | Stadium: Pirelli Stadium; Attendance: 4,763; Referee: Alan Young |

| 8 February 2022 30 | Sheffield Wednesday | 1–0 | Wigan Athletic | Owlerton, Sheffield |
| 19:45 GMT | Bannan (yellow card) 21', (goal) 53' (pen.); Paterson (yellow card) 76' | Report | Power (yellow card) 71' | Stadium: Hillsborough; Attendance: 20,210; Referee: Tim Robinson |

| 13 February 2022 31 | Sheffield Wednesday | 0–2 | Rotherham United | Owlerton, Sheffield |
| 12:00 GMT | Byers (yellow card) 64'; Hutchinson (yellow card) 72' | Report | Ladapo 59'; Smith 84' | Stadium: Hillsborough; Attendance: 26,418; Referee: Darren Drysdale |
Note: Live on Sky Sports

| 19 February 2022 32 | Doncaster Rovers | 1–3 | Sheffield Wednesday | Doncaster |
| 15:00 GMT | Gardner 45' (pen.), (yellow card) 74' | Report | Byers (yellow card) 50'; Paterson 70'; Bannan (penalty missed) 78', 83'; Berahino 80' | Stadium: Eco-Power Stadium; Attendance: 11,217; Referee: Craig Hicks |

| 26 February 2022 33 | Sheffield Wednesday | 2–0 | Charlton Athletic | Owlerton, Sheffield |
| 15:00 GMT | Byers 5'; Palmer (yellow card) 43'; Paterson 45', (yellow card) 90+1'; Storey (yellow card) 82' | Report | Jaiyesimi (yellow card) 49'; Purrington (yellow card) 75' | Stadium: Hillsborough; Attendance: 21,845; Referee: Oliver Langford |

| 1 March 2022 34 | Sheffield Wednesday | 5–2 | Burton Albion | Owlerton, Sheffield |
| 19:45 GMT | Palmer 13'; Bannan 28', 87'; Paterson 67', (yellow card) 90+3'; Johnson 75'; Hutchinson (yellow card) 84' | Report | Niasse (yellow card) 25', (goal) 50'; Guedioura 30'; Oshilaja (yellow card) 77' | Stadium: Hillsborough; Attendance: 20,309; Referee: Samuel Barrott |

| 5 March 2022 35 | Lincoln City | 3–1 | Sheffield Wednesday | Lincoln |
| 15:00 GMT | Marquis 3', 76'; Maguire (yellow card) 16'; McGrandles (yellow card) 29'; Norton-Cuffy 62' | Report | Paterson (yellow card) 29'; Berahino 33' | Stadium: LNER Stadium; Attendance: 10,283; Referee: Martin Coy |

| 12 March 2022 36 | Sheffield Wednesday | 6–0 | Cambridge United | Owlerton, Sheffield |
| 15:00 GMT | Jones 6' (o.g.); Bannan 10'; Berahino 37', 41', 54'; Byers 48' | Report | | Stadium: Hillsborough; Attendance: 22,646; Referee: Sebastian Stockbridge |

| 15 March 2022 37 | Sheffield Wednesday | 1–1 | Accrington Stanley | Owlerton, Sheffield |
| 19:45 GMT | Hutchinson (yellow card) 64'; Paterson 66' | Report | Johnson 83' (o.g.) | Stadium: Hillsborough; Attendance: 20,688; Referee: Ross Joyce |

| 19 March 2022 38 | Gillingham | 0–0 | Sheffield Wednesday | Gillingham |
| 15:00 GMT | Jackson (yellow card) 57'; Masterson (yellow card) 77'; Kelman (yellow card) 90+4' | Report | Dunkley (yellow card) 14'; Bannan (yellow card) 83'; Hutchinson (yellow card) 87' | Stadium: Priestfield Stadium; Attendance: 7,433; Referee: Gavin Ward |

| 26 March 2022 39 | Sheffield Wednesday | 4–1 | Cheltenham Town | Owlerton, Sheffield |
| 15:00 GMT | Luongo 7'; Gregory 58', (yellow card) 82'; Hunt 83'; Byers 87' | Report | May 4'; Boyle (yellow card) 34'; Wright (yellow card) 57'; Raglan (yellow card) 64' | Stadium: Hillsborough; Attendance: 21,925; Referee: Leigh Doughty |

| 2 April 2022 40 | Sheffield Wednesday | 2–1 | AFC Wimbledon | Owlerton, Sheffield |
| 15:00 BST | Hunt 11'; Gregory (yellow card) 52', (goal) 90+2'; Dean (yellow card) 90+1' | Report | Assal 22'; Csóka (yellow card) 90+6' | Stadium: Hillsborough; Attendance: 22,374; Referee: Peter Wright |

| 9 April 2022 41 | Bolton Wanderers | 1–1 | Sheffield Wednesday | Bolton |
| 15:00 BST | Johnston (yellow card) 30'; Jones (yellow card) 36'; Gordon (yellow card) 79'; Kachunga (yellow card) 89'; Williams 90' | Report | Dean (yellow card) 43'; Storey 66'; Hunt (yellow card) 89' | Stadium: University of Bolton Stadium; Attendance: 19,164; Referee: Carl Brook |

| 16 April 2022 42 | Milton Keynes Dons | 2–3 | Sheffield Wednesday | Milton Keynes |
| 19:45 BST | Parrott 40'; Darling (yellow card) 71'; Coventry (yellow card) 83'; Twine 90+6' | Report | Berahino 10'; Gregory 20'; Bannan 30'; Storey (yellow card) 59'; Palmer (yellow card) 90+1'; Johnson (yellow card) 90+8' | Stadium: Stadium MK; Attendance: 14,252; Referee: Ben Toner |
Note: Live on Sky Sports

| 19 April 2022 43 | Sheffield Wednesday | 1–0 | Crewe Alexandra | Owlerton, Sheffield |
| 19:45 BST | Gregory 54' (pen.); Luongo (yellow card) 80' | Report | Ainley (yellow card) 45+2'; Richards (yellow card) 54' | Stadium: Hillsborough Stadium; Attendance: 22,566; Referee: Charles Breakspear |

| 23 April 2022 44 | Wycombe Wanderers | 1–0 | Sheffield Wednesday | High Wycombe |
| 15:00 BST | Jacobson (yellow card) 59'; Obita 62'; McCleary (yellow card) 90+3' | Report | Dunkley (yellow card) 18'; Hutchinson (yellow card) 81' | Stadium: Adams Park; Attendance: 9,005; Referee: Andy Davies |

| 26 April 2022 45 | Fleetwood Town | 2–3 | Sheffield Wednesday | Fleetwood |
| 19:45 BST | Camps 18'; Garner (yellow card) 22', (goal) 34'; Andrew (yellow card) 57'; Boyle (yellow card) 83' | Report | Gregory 7', 73', 74'; Hutchinson (yellow card) 57'; Luongo (yellow card) 59' | Stadium: Highbury Stadium; Attendance: 3,901; Referee: Carl Boyeson |

| 30 April 2022 46 | Sheffield Wednesday | 4–1 | Portsmouth | Owlerton, Sheffield |
| 12:30 BST | Gregory 17', (yellow card) 74'; Berahino 36'; Storey 40'; Paterson (yellow card) 85'; Byers 86', (yellow card) 90' | Report | Hirst 4'; Morell (yellow card) 90' | Stadium: Hillsborough Stadium; Attendance: 33,394; Referee: Anthony Backhouse |

==== Play-offs ====
Sheffield Wednesday finished 4th in the regular 2021–22 EFL League One season, so were drawn against 5th placed Sunderland in the Play-off Semi Final. The first leg took place at the Stadium of Light and the second leg took place at Hillsborough.

| 6 May 2022 Semi-final, first leg | Sunderland | 1–0 | Sheffield Wednesday | Sunderland |
| 19:45 BST | Stewart 45+1'; O'Nien (yellow card) 63' | Report | Luongo (yellow card) 52' | Stadium: Stadium of Light; Attendance: 44,742; Referee: Matt Donohue |

| 9 May 2022 Semi-final, second leg | Sheffield Wednesday | 1–1 (1–2 agg.) | Sunderland | Owlerton, Sheffield |
| 19:45 BST | Byers (yellow card) 24'; Bannan (yellow card) 27'; Gregory 74'; Dean (yellow card) 77' | Report | Stewart (yellow card) 45+1'; Roberts 90+3'; Matete (yellow card) 90+11' | Stadium: Hillsborough Stadium; Attendance: 32,978; Referee: James Linington |

=== FA Cup ===
Sheffield Wednesday were drawn at home to Plymouth Argyle in the first round. Either Sheffield Wednesday or Plymouth were drawn against Rochdale or Notts County in the second round draw, made on 8 November.

| 7 November 2021 First round | Sheffield Wednesday | 0–0 | Plymouth Argyle | Owlerton, Sheffield |
| 12:15 GMT | Adeniran (yellow card) 47'; Wing (yellow card) 71' | Report | | Stadium: Hillsborough; Attendance: 7,261; Referee: Anthony Backhouse |
Note: Live on ITV

| 16 November 2021 First round replay | Plymouth Argyle | 3–0 | Sheffield Wednesday | Plymouth |
| 19:45 GMT | Garrick 20', 67'; Hardie 36' | Report | Brown (yellow card) 56'; Wildsmith (yellow card) 68' | Stadium: Home Park; Attendance: 11,094; Referee: Chris Sarginson |

=== EFL Cup ===
The first round draw was made on 24 June, live on Sky Sports, by Andy Cole and Danny Mills.

| 1 August 2021 First round | Sheffield Wednesday | 0–0 (2–4 p) | Huddersfield Town | Owlerton, Sheffield |
| 13:00 BST | | Report | | Stadium: Hillsborough; Attendance: 12,860; Referee: Darren Bond |
| | Penalties |
| | Hutchinson (penalty scored); Adeniran (penalty scored); Luongo (penalty missed); Palmer (penalty missed) | | (penalty scored) Rhodes; (penalty scored) Thomas; (penalty scored) Sinani; (penalty scored) O'Brien |

=== EFL Trophy ===
Sheffield Wednesday were drawn into Northern Group H alongside Harrogate Town, Mansfield Town and Newcastle United U21. They were drawn against Hartlepool United in the second round.

| Pos | Div | Team | Pld | W | PW | PL | L | GF | GA | GD | Pts | Qualification |
|---|---|---|---|---|---|---|---|---|---|---|---|---|
| 1 | L1 | Sheffield Wednesday | 3 | 3 | 0 | 0 | 0 | 9 | 1 | +8 | 9 | Advance to Round 2 |
| 2 | L2 | Harrogate Town | 3 | 2 | 0 | 0 | 1 | 5 | 5 | 0 | 6 | Advance to Round 2 |
| 3 | L2 | Mansfield Town | 3 | 1 | 0 | 0 | 2 | 8 | 8 | 0 | 3 | |
| 4 | ACA | Newcastle United U21 | 3 | 0 | 0 | 0 | 3 | 3 | 11 | −8 | 0 | |

Source: EFL.com

| 31 August 2021 Group Game 1 | Sheffield Wednesday | 3–0 | Newcastle United U21 | Owlerton, Sheffield |
| 19:00 BST | Dele-Bashiru (yellow card) 37'; Sow 41'; Johnson 52'; Palmer 54'; Hunt (yellow card) 73' | Report | Wiggett (yellow card) 20'; Bondswell (yellow card) 69' | Stadium: Hillsborough; Attendance: 6,593; Referee: Peter Wright |

| 5 October 2021 Group Game 2 | Mansfield Town | 1–2 | Sheffield Wednesday | Mansfield |
| 19:00 BST | Charsley (yellow card) 28'; Burke (yellow card) 63'; Quinn 68'; Ward (yellow card) 87' | Report | Wing 63'; Kamberi 90+3' | Stadium: One Call Stadium; Attendance: 2,836; Referee: Rebecca Welch |

| 9 November 2021 Group Game 3 | Sheffield Wednesday | 4–0 | Harrogate Town | Owlerton, Sheffield |
| 19:00 BST | Berahino 17'; Brown (yellow card) 20'; Byers (yellow card) 45' (goal) 57'; Sow 60'; Adedoyin 68' (pen.) | Report | Hall (red card) 68' | Stadium: Hillsborough; Attendance: 5,433; Referee: Trevor Kettle |

| 1 December 2021 Round 2 | Sheffield Wednesday | 0–3 | Hartlepool United | Owlerton, Sheffield |
| 19:00 GMT | Paterson (yellow card) 87'; Bannan (yellow card) 88' | Report | Shelton 11'; Brown 14' (o.g.); Goodwin 59'; Fondop (yellow card) 87' | Stadium: Hillsborough; Attendance: 5,109; Referee: Andy Haines |

== Transfers and contracts ==
=== Transfers in ===
| Date | Position | Nationality | Name | From | Fee | Ref. |
|---|---|---|---|---|---|---|
| 1 July 2021 | CB | (England) | David Agbontohoma | (England) Southampton | Free transfer | |
| 10 July 2021 | CM | (England) | Dennis Adeniran | (England) Everton | Free transfer | |
| 14 July 2021 | LB | (England) | Jaden Brown | (England) Huddersfield Town | Free transfer | |
| 22 July 2021 | RB | (England) | Jack Hunt | (England) Bristol City | Free transfer | |
| 3 August 2021 | CM | (Scotland) | George Byers | (Wales) Swansea City | Undisclosed | |
| 5 August 2021 | LW | (England) | Marvin Johnson | (England) Middlesbrough | Free transfer | |
| 5 August 2021 | CF | (England) | Lee Gregory | (England) Stoke City | Undisclosed | |
| 10 August 2021 | RW | (Netherlands) | Sylla Sow | (Netherlands) RKC Waalwijk | Free transfer | |
| 31 August 2021 | CF | (Burundi) | Saido Berahino | (Belgium) Zulte Waregem | Undisclosed | |
| 22 November 2021 | RW | (England) | Nathaniel Mendez-Laing | (England) Middlesbrough | Free transfer | |
| 6 December 2021 | AM | (England) | Jayden Onen | (England) Reading | Free transfer | |
| 10 December 2021 | RB | (England) | Kwame Boateng | (Wales) The New Saints | Free transfer | |

=== Transfers out ===
| Date | Position | Nationality | Name | To | Fee | Ref. |
|---|---|---|---|---|---|---|
| 1 July 2021 | DF | (England) | Luke Cox | (England) Redditch United | Released | |
| 1 July 2021 | RB | (England) | Charlie Curtis | (United States) Lander Bearcats | Released | |
| 1 July 2021 | CB | (Wales) | Corey Glaves | (England) Staveley Miners Welfare | Released | |
| 1 July 2021 | MF | (England) | Luke Hall | (England) Sheffield | Released | |
| 1 July 2021 | GK | (England) | Alex Hare | (England) Alfreton Town | Released | |
| 1 July 2021 | RW | (England) | Kadeem Harris | (Ukraine) Metalist Kharkiv | Released | |
| 1 July 2021 | RM | (England) | Ben Hughes | (England) Marine | Released | |
| 1 July 2021 | LW | (England) | Calum Huxley | (Wales) Caernarfon Town | Released | |
| 1 July 2021 | FW | (Democratic Republic of the Congo) | Elias Kachunga | (England) Bolton Wanderers | Released | |
| 1 July 2021 | CB | (England) | Tom Lees | (England) Huddersfield Town | Released | |
| 1 July 2021 | LB | (England) | Matt Penney | (England) Ipswich Town | Released | |
| 1 July 2021 | RB | (England) | Moses Odubajo | (England) Queens Park Rangers | Released | |
| 1 July 2021 | CM | (Netherlands) | Joey Pelupessy | (Turkey) Giresunspor | Released | |
| 1 July 2021 | LW | (England) | Adam Reach | (England) West Bromwich Albion | Released | |
| 1 July 2021 | MF | (England) | Charlie Reaney | (England) Sheffield | Released | |
| 1 July 2021 | FW | (Scotland) | Jordan Rhodes | (England) Huddersfield Town | Released | |
| 1 July 2021 | CB | (England) | Isaac Rice | (England) Newark | Released | |
| 1 July 2021 | CM | (England) | Liam Shaw | (Scotland) Celtic | Undisclosed | |
| 1 July 2021 | RB | (England) | Osaze Urhoghide | (Scotland) Celtic | Undisclosed | |
| 1 July 2021 | CB | (Netherlands) | Joost van Aken | (Belgium) Zulte Waregem | Released | |
| 1 July 2021 | GK | (Republic of Ireland) | Keiren Westwood | (England) Queens Park Rangers | Released | |
| 1 July 2021 | LB | (England) | Luke Yates | Free agent | Released | |
| 2 August 2021 | CB | (Germany) | Julian Börner | (Germany) Hannover 96 | Undisclosed | |
| 19 August 2021 | LW | (England) | Andre Green | (Slovakia) Slovan Bratislava | Undisclosed | |
| 1 February 2022 | FW | (Nigeria) | Korede Adedoyin | (England) Accrington Stanley | Undisclosed | |

=== Loans in ===
| Date from | Position | Nationality | Name | From | Date until | Ref. |
|---|---|---|---|---|---|---|
| 11 July 2021 | LW | (Republic of Ireland) | Olamide Shodipo | (England) Queens Park Rangers | End of season | |
| 27 July 2021 | GK | (Northern Ireland) | Bailey Peacock-Farrell | (England) Burnley | End of season | |
| 27 July 2021 | AM | (England) | Lewis Wing | (England) Middlesbrough | 31 January 2022 (Note: Lewis Wing was recalled from his loan on 31 January 2022.) | |
| 30 July 2021 | CF | (Albania) | Florian Kamberi | (Switzerland) St. Gallen | End of season | |
| 2 August 2021 | FW | (Canada) | Theo Corbeanu | (England) Wolverhampton Wanderers | 7 January 2022 (Note: Theo Corbeanu was recalled from his loan on 7 January 2022.) | |
| 7 August 2021 | CB | (England) | Lewis Gibson | (England) Everton | End of season | |
| 19 January 2022 | CB | (England) | Jordan Storey | (England) Preston North End | End of season | |
| 25 January 2022 | FW | (England) | Tyreece John-Jules | (England) Arsenal | End of season | |
| 26 January 2022 | CB | (England) | Harlee Dean | (England) Birmingham City | End of season | |

=== Loans out ===
| Date from | Position | Nationality | Name | To | Date until | Ref. |
|---|---|---|---|---|---|---|
| 29 July 2021 | GK | (England) | Cameron Dawson | (England) Exeter City | End of season | |
| 12 August 2021 | CM | (England) | Alex Hunt | (England) Grimsby Town | 3 January 2022 | |
| 13 August 2021 | LB | (England) | Ryan Galvin | (England) Gloucester City | 2 January 2022 (Note: Ryan Galvin's loan was extended until January on 13 September 2021.) | |
| 7 September 2021 | CM | (England) | Liam Waldock | (England) Gainsborough Trinity | 1 November 2021 (Note: Liam Waldock's loan was extended for a further month on 5 October 2021.) | |
| 9 September 2021 | RW | (England) | Charles Hagan | (England) Hampton & Richmond | 5 January 2022 | |
| 16 September 2021 | GK | (England) | Luke Jackson | (England) Guisley | 16 November 2021 (Note: Luke Jackson's loan was extended for a further month on 15 October 2021.) | |
| 22 September 2021 | CB | (Republic of Ireland) | Ciaran Brennan | (England) Notts County | 8 November 2021 (Note: Ciaran Brennan was recalled on 8 November 2021.) | |
| 16 October 2021 | RB | (England) | Josh Dawodu | (England) Stalybridge Celtic | 10 January 2022 (Note: Josh Dawodu's loan was extended until January on 16 November 2021.) | |
| 22 October 2021 | AM | (England) | Lewis Farmer | (England) Redditch United | 22 November 2021 | |
| 23 October 2021 | GK | (England) | Joshua Render | (England) Grantham Town | 8 November 2021 (Note: Joshua Render was recalled on 8 November 2021.) | |
| 17 January 2022 | CM | (England) | Alex Hunt | (England) Oldham Athletic | End of season | |

=== New contracts ===
| Date | Position | Nationality | Name | Length | Expiry | Ref. |
|---|---|---|---|---|---|---|
| 1 July 2021 | RB | (England) | Leojo Davidson | — | — | |
| 6 August 2021 | GK | (England) | Luke Jackson | — | — | |
| 10 August 2021 | FW | (England) | Josh Windass | 2 years | June 2023 | |
| 23 August 2021 | CB | (England) | Dominic Iorfa | 2 years | June 2023 | |
| 13 September 2021 | LB | (England) | Ryan Galvin | 2 years | June 2023 | |
| 14 October 2021 | GK | (England) | Jack Hall | — | — | |
| 11 November 2021 | RB | (Scotland) | Liam Palmer | 2 years | June 2023 | |
| 14 January 2022 | CM | (England) | Alex Hunt | 1 1/2 years | June 2023 | |
| 18 January 2022 | CB | (Republic of Ireland) | Ciaran Brennan | 2 1/2 years | June 2024 | |
| 21 May 2022 | LM | (England) | Marvin Johnson | — | — | |

== Squad statistics ==
=== Appearances ===
As of 9 May 2022

| No. | Pos | Nat | Player | Total | | League One | | Play-offs | | FA Cup | | EFL Cup | | EFL Trophy | |
| No. | Pos | Nat | Player | Apps | Goals | Apps | Goals | Apps | Goals | Apps | Goals | Apps | Goals | Apps | Goals |
|---|---|---|---|---|---|---|---|---|---|---|---|---|---|---|---|
| 1 | GK | (Northern Ireland) NIR | Bailey Peacock-Farrell | 47 | 0 | 43 | 0 | 2 | 0 | 1 | 0 | 1 | 0 | 0 | 0 |
| 2 | DF | (Scotland) SCO | Liam Palmer | 46 | 2 | 37+2 | 1 | 1+1 | 0 | 2 | 0 | 1 | 0 | 1+1 | 1 |
| 3 | DF | (England) ENG | Jaden Brown | 16 | 0 | 7+4 | 0 | 0 | 0 | 1 | 0 | 0+1 | 0 | 2+1 | 0 |
| 4 | DF | (England) ENG | Lewis Gibson | 6 | 0 | 3+2 | 0 | 0 | 0 | 0 | 0 | 0 | 0 | 1 | 0 |
| 5 | DF | (England) ENG | Sam Hutchinson | 31 | 1 | 28 | 1 | 2 | 0 | 0 | 0 | 1 | 0 | 0 | 0 |
| 6 | DF | (England) ENG | Dominic Iorfa | 21 | 0 | 16+3 | 0 | 0 | 0 | 0 | 0 | 1 | 0 | 1 | 0 |
| 7 | MF | (Republic of Ireland) IRL | Olamide Shodipo | 21 | 1 | 7+8 | 1 | 0 | 0 | 0+2 | 0 | 1 | 0 | 2+1 | 0 |
| 8 | MF | (England) ENG | Dennis Adeniran | 23 | 3 | 12+6 | 3 | 0 | 0 | 2 | 0 | 1 | 0 | 1+1 | 0 |
| 9 | FW | (England) ENG | Lee Gregory | 39 | 17 | 31+5 | 16 | 2 | 1 | 0+1 | 0 | 0 | 0 | 0 | 0 |
| 10 | MF | (Scotland) SCO | Barry Bannan | 51 | 9 | 45 | 9 | 2 | 0 | 2 | 0 | 1 | 0 | 0+1 | 0 |
| 11 | FW | (England) ENG | Josh Windass | 12 | 4 | 3+6 | 4 | 1+1 | 0 | 0 | 0 | 0 | 0 | 0+1 | 0 |
| 13 | FW | (Scotland) SCO | Callum Paterson | 44 | 6 | 27+12 | 6 | 0+1 | 0 | 2 | 0 | 1 | 0 | 1 | 0 |
| 14 | MF | (Scotland) SCO | George Byers | 27 | 7 | 21+1 | 6 | 2 | 0 | 0 | 0 | 0 | 0 | 2+1 | 1 |
| 16 | DF | (England) ENG | Harlee Dean | 9 | 0 | 6+1 | 0 | 2 | 0 | 0 | 0 | 0 | 0 | 0 | 0 |
| 17 | MF | (England) ENG | Fisayo Dele-Bashiru | 32 | 1 | 16+8 | 1 | 0+1 | 0 | 1+1 | 0 | 0+1 | 0 | 3+1 | 0 |
| 18 | MF | (England) ENG | Marvin Johnson | 44 | 3 | 38+1 | 2 | 2 | 0 | 1 | 0 | 0 | 0 | 2 | 1 |
| 19 | DF | (England) ENG | David Agbontohoma | 2 | 0 | 0 | 0 | 0 | 0 | 0 | 0 | 0 | 0 | 1+1 | 0 |
| 20 | FW | (Albania) ALB | Florian Kamberi | 27 | 5 | 12+11 | 4 | 0 | 0 | 2 | 0 | 0 | 0 | 2 | 1 |
| 21 | MF | (Australia) AUS | Massimo Luongo | 30 | 1 | 23+2 | 1 | 2 | 0 | 0+1 | 0 | 0+1 | 0 | 1 | 0 |
| 22 | DF | (England) ENG | Chey Dunkley | 24 | 2 | 15+6 | 2 | 0 | 0 | 2 | 0 | 0 | 0 | 1 | 0 |
| 24 | FW | (Burundi) BDI | Saido Berahino | 36 | 9 | 13+16 | 8 | 1+1 | 0 | 2 | 0 | 0 | 0 | 3 | 1 |
| 27 | MF | (England) ENG | Liam Waldock | 1 | 0 | 0 | 0 | 0 | 0 | 0 | 0 | 0 | 0 | 1 | 0 |
| 28 | GK | (England) ENG | Joe Wildsmith | 8 | 0 | 3 | 0 | 0 | 0 | 1 | 0 | 0 | 0 | 4 | 0 |
| 30 | FW | (England) ENG | Tyreece John-Jules | 1 | 0 | 0+1 | 0 | 0 | 0 | 0 | 0 | 0 | 0 | 0 | 0 |
| 32 | DF | (England) ENG | Jack Hunt | 46 | 2 | 36+3 | 2 | 1 | 0 | 0+1 | 0 | 1 | 0 | 2+2 | 0 |
| 34 | DF | (Republic of Ireland) IRL | Ciaran Brennan | 14 | 0 | 5+6 | 0 | 0 | 0 | 0 | 0 | 0 | 0 | 3 | 0 |
| 38 | DF | (England) ENG | Jordan Storey | 21 | 2 | 19 | 2 | 2 | 0 | 0 | 0 | 0 | 0 | 0 | 0 |
| 40 | FW | (Netherlands) NED | Sylla Sow | 19 | 4 | 5+8 | 2 | 0 | 0 | 0+2 | 0 | 0 | 0 | 4 | 2 |
| 41 | MF | (England) ENG | Nathaniel Mendez-Laing | 19 | 2 | 12+6 | 2 | 0+1 | 0 | 0 | 0 | 0 | 0 | 0 | 0 |
Players that left the club mid-season:
| 15 | FW | (Nigeria) NGR | Korede Adedoyin | 3 | 1 | 0 | 0 | 0 | 0 | 0 | 0 | 0 | 0 | 0+3 | 1 |
| 19 | MF | (England) ENG | Andre Green | 3 | 0 | 2 | 0 | 0 | 0 | 0 | 0 | 1 | 0 | 0 | 0 |
| 23 | FW | (Canada) CAN | Theo Corbeanu | 18 | 2 | 6+7 | 2 | 0 | 0 | 1+1 | 0 | 0 | 0 | 3 | 0 |
| 26 | MF | (England) ENG | Lewis Wing | 24 | 1 | 15+3 | 0 | 0 | 0 | 2 | 0 | 1 | 0 | 3 | 1 |

=== Goalscorers ===
As of 9 May 2022

Includes all competitive matches.

| Rank | Pos. | Nat. | No. | Player | League One | Playoffs | FA Cup | EFL Cup | EFL Trophy | Total |
|---|---|---|---|---|---|---|---|---|---|---|
| 1 | FW | (England) | 9 | Lee Gregory | 16 | 1 | 0 | 0 | 0 | 17 |
| 2 | MF | (Scotland) | 10 | Barry Bannan | 9 | 0 | 0 | 0 | 0 | 9 |
| 2 | FW | (Burundi) | 24 | Saido Berahino | 8 | 0 | 0 | 0 | 1 | 9 |
| 3 | MF | (Scotland) | 14 | George Byers | 6 | 0 | 0 | 0 | 1 | 7 |
| 4 | FW | (Scotland) | 13 | Callum Paterson | 6 | 0 | 0 | 0 | 0 | 6 |
| 5 | FW | (Switzerland) | 20 | Florian Kamberi | 4 | 0 | 0 | 0 | 1 | 5 |
| 6 | FW | (England) | 11 | Josh Windass | 4 | 0 | 0 | 0 | 0 | 4 |
| 6 | FW | (Netherlands) | 40 | Sylla Sow | 2 | 0 | 0 | 0 | 2 | 4 |
| 7 | MF | (England) | 8 | Dennis Adeniran | 3 | 0 | 0 | 0 | 0 | 3 |
| 7 | MF | (England) | 18 | Marvin Johnson | 2 | 0 | 0 | 0 | 1 | 3 |
| 8 | DF | (Scotland) | 2 | Liam Palmer | 1 | 0 | 0 | 0 | 1 | 2 |
| 8 | DF | (England) | 22 | Chey Dunkley | 2 | 0 | 0 | 0 | 0 | 2 |
| 8 | FW | (Canada) | 23 | Theo Corbeanu | 2 | 0 | 0 | 0 | 0 | 2 |
| 8 | DF | (England) | 32 | Jack Hunt | 2 | 0 | 0 | 0 | 0 | 2 |
| 8 | DF | (England) | 38 | Jordan Storey | 2 | 0 | 0 | 0 | 0 | 2 |
| 8 | MF | (England) | 41 | Nathaniel Mendez-Laing | 2 | 0 | 0 | 0 | 0 | 2 |
| 9 | DF | (England) | 5 | Sam Hutchinson | 1 | 0 | 0 | 0 | 0 | 1 |
| 9 | MF | (Republic of Ireland) | 7 | Olamide Shodipo | 1 | 0 | 0 | 0 | 0 | 1 |
| 9 | FW | (Nigeria) | 15 | Korede Adedoyin | 0 | 0 | 0 | 0 | 1 | 1 |
| 9 | MF | (England) | 17 | Fisayo Dele-Bashiru | 1 | 0 | 0 | 0 | 0 | 1 |
| 9 | MF | (Australia) | 21 | Massimo Luongo | 1 | 0 | 0 | 0 | 0 | 1 |
| 9 | MF | (England) | 26 | Lewis Wing | 0 | 0 | 0 | 0 | 1 | 1 |
| Own goals | | | | | 3 | 0 | 0 | 0 | 0 | 2 |
| Total | | | | | 78 | 1 | 0 | 0 | 9 | 88 |

=== Disciplinary record ===
As of 9 May 2022

| No. | Pos. | Name | League One | | Playoffs | | FA Cup | | EFL Cup | | EFL Trophy | | Total | |
| No. | Pos. | Name | Booked | Sent off (straight red) | Booked | Sent off (straight red) | Booked | Sent off (straight red) | Booked | Sent off (straight red) | Booked | Sent off (straight red) | Booked | Sent off (straight red) |
|---|---|---|---|---|---|---|---|---|---|---|---|---|---|---|
| 21 | MF | Massimo Luongo | 6 | 1 | 1 | 0 | 0 | 0 | 0 | 0 | 0 | 0 | 7 | 1 |
| 13 | FW | Callum Paterson | 10 | 0 | 0 | 0 | 0 | 0 | 0 | 0 | 1 | 0 | 11 | 0 |
| 5 | DF | Sam Hutchinson | 10 | 0 | 0 | 0 | 0 | 0 | 0 | 0 | 0 | 0 | 10 | 0 |
| 10 | MF | Barry Bannan | 8 | 0 | 1 | 0 | 0 | 0 | 0 | 0 | 1 | 0 | 10 | 0 |
| 14 | MF | George Byers | 6 | 0 | 1 | 0 | 0 | 0 | 0 | 0 | 1 | 0 | 8 | 0 |
| 32 | DF | Jack Hunt | 4 | 0 | 0 | 0 | 0 | 0 | 1 | 0 | 1 | 0 | 6 | 0 |
| 2 | DF | Liam Palmer | 5 | 0 | 0 | 0 | 0 | 0 | 0 | 0 | 0 | 0 | 5 | 0 |
| 18 | MF | Marvin Johnson | 5 | 0 | 0 | 0 | 0 | 0 | 0 | 0 | 0 | 0 | 5 | 0 |
| 22 | DF | Chey Dunkley | 5 | 0 | 0 | 0 | 0 | 0 | 0 | 0 | 0 | 0 | 5 | 0 |
| 3 | DF | Jaden Brown | 2 | 0 | 0 | 0 | 1 | 0 | 0 | 0 | 1 | 0 | 4 | 0 |
| 6 | DF | Dominic Iorfa | 3 | 0 | 0 | 0 | 0 | 0 | 1 | 0 | 0 | 0 | 4 | 0 |
| 8 | MF | Dennis Adeniran | 3 | 0 | 0 | 0 | 1 | 0 | 0 | 0 | 0 | 0 | 4 | 0 |
| 9 | FW | Lee Gregory | 4 | 0 | 0 | 0 | 0 | 0 | 0 | 0 | 0 | 0 | 4 | 0 |
| 16 | DF | Harlee Dean | 3 | 0 | 1 | 0 | 0 | 0 | 0 | 0 | 0 | 0 | 4 | 0 |
| 1 | GK | Bailey Peacock-Farrell | 2 | 0 | 0 | 0 | 0 | 0 | 0 | 0 | 0 | 0 | 2 | 0 |
| 7 | MF | Olamide Shodipo | 2 | 0 | 0 | 0 | 0 | 0 | 0 | 0 | 0 | 0 | 2 | 0 |
| 26 | MF | Lewis Wing | 1 | 0 | 0 | 0 | 0 | 1 | 0 | 0 | 0 | 0 | 2 | 0 |
| 38 | DF | Jordan Storey | 2 | 0 | 0 | 0 | 0 | 0 | 0 | 0 | 0 | 0 | 2 | 0 |
| 17 | MF | Fisayo Dele-Bashiru | 0 | 0 | 0 | 0 | 0 | 0 | 0 | 0 | 1 | 0 | 1 | 0 |
| 23 | FW | Theo Corbeanu | 1 | 0 | 0 | 0 | 0 | 0 | 0 | 0 | 0 | 0 | 1 | 0 |
| 28 | GK | Joe Wildsmith | 0 | 0 | 0 | 0 | 1 | 0 | 0 | 0 | 0 | 0 | 1 | 0 |
| 40 | FW | Sylla Sow | 1 | 0 | 0 | 0 | 0 | 0 | 0 | 0 | 0 | 0 | 1 | 0 |

=== Clean sheets ===
As of 9 May 2022

| No. | Nat. | Player | Matches played | Clean sheet % | League One | Playoffs | FA Cup | EFL Cup | EFL Trophy | TOTAL |
|---|---|---|---|---|---|---|---|---|---|---|
| 1 | (Northern Ireland) | Bailey Peacock-Farrell | 47 | 36.17% | 15 | 0 | 1 | 1 | 0 | 17 |
| 28 | (England) | Joe Wildsmith | 8 | 37.5% | 1 | 0 | 0 | 0 | 2 | 3 |

== Awards ==
=== Club Player of the Month ===
Player of the Month awards for the 2021–22 season.

| Month | Player | % | Ref. |
|---|---|---|---|
| August | (Northern Ireland) Bailey Peacock-Farrell | 55% | |
| September | (England) Dennis Adeniran | 47% | |
| October | (England) Fisayo Dele-Bashiru | 52% | |
| November | (England) Chey Dunkley | 72% | |
| December | (Northern Ireland) Bailey Peacock-Farrell | 24% | |
| January | (Australia) Massimo Luongo | 39% | |
| February | (Scotland) George Byers | 55% | |
| March | (Scotland) Barry Bannan | 34% | |

=== Club Player of the Season ===
| Player | % | Ref. |
|---|---|---|
| (Scotland) Barry Bannan | 70% | |

=== Sky Bet League One Player of the Month ===
| Month | Player | | Ref. |
|---|---|---|---|
| August | (Northern Ireland) Bailey Peacock-Farrell | Nomination | |
| February | (Scotland) Barry Bannan | Nomination | |
| March | (Scotland) Barry Bannan | Winner | |
| April | (England) Lee Gregory | Winner | |

=== Sky Bet League One Manager of the Month ===
| Month | Manager | | Ref. |
|---|---|---|---|
| November | (Jamaica) Darren Moore | Nomination | |
| February | (Jamaica) Darren Moore | Nomination | |
| April | (Jamaica) Darren Moore | Nomination | |

=== Sky Bet League One Player of the Season ===
| Player | | Ref. |
|---|---|---|
| (Scotland) Barry Bannan | Nomination | |

=== EFL Goal of the Season ===
| Player | Goal | | Ref |
|---|---|---|---|
| (Scotland) Barry Bannan | 30' vs Milton Keynes Dons, 16 April | Winner | |
