= 2015–16 Sheffield Wednesday F.C. season =

English football club season

Sheffield Wednesday
2015–16 season
- Owner: Dejphon Chansiri
- Head Coach: Carlos Carvalhal
- Stadium: Hillsborough
- Championship: 6th
- FA Cup: 4th round (eliminated by Shrewsbury)
- League Cup: 5th round (eliminated by Stoke City)
- Top goalscorer: League: Fernando Forestieri (15); All: Fernando Forestieri (15)
- Highest home attendance: 35,065 (vs Arsenal; League Cup)
- Lowest home attendance: 11,799 (vs Oxford United; League Cup)
- Average home league attendance: 22,641
Home colours	Away colours	Third colours

The 2015–16 season was Sheffield Wednesday's fourth consecutive season in the Championship. Along with competing in the Championship, the club also participated in the FA Cup and League Cup.

The season covers the period from 1 July 2015 to 30 June 2016.

== Overview ==
=== Pre-season ===
Prior to the start of the pre-season schedule the club announced that eleven players had been released after reaching the end of their contracts. Also in June, head coach Stuart Gray was sacked after 18 months in charge. Carlos Carvalhal was announced as Gray's replacement on 30 June 2015.

=== August ===
Sheffield Wednesday got their 2015–16 season underway at Hillsborough to Bristol City - a match that The Owls won 2–0 thanks to second half goals from Tom Lees and Lewis McGugan who signed a permanent deal after spending last season on loan at the club. This was followed by a victory in the Capital One Cup - which was also at Hillsborough - with a 4–1 victory over League Two side Mansfield Town. The second league match of the season was a 2–1 away loss to Ipswich Town. This was followed by two consecutive 1–1 draws which were at home to Reading and away to Leeds United respectively. In the next game The Owls progressed into the third round of the Capital One Cup with a 1–0 win over Oxford United. This was followed by the first home defeat of the season with a 3–1 loss to Middlesbrough.

=== September ===
The Owls lost their first game of September in a 3–1 defeat to Burnley at Turf Moor. This was followed by a goalless draw at the Macron Stadium against lowly Bolton Wanderers and The Owls' second league victory of the season - a 3–2 win against Fulham at Hillsborough, in which star signing Fernando Forestieri scored his first goal since moving from Watford, a simple close range finish on 5 minutes. A few days later Sheffield Wednesday progressed into the fourth round of the Capital One Cup with a 1–0 win against Newcastle United with Lewis McGugan scoring the game's only goal in a shock result. The Owls' last game of September was a 2–1 away win at Brentford thanks to an Atdhe Nuhiu penalty and a late winner from Lucas João.

=== October ===
The Owls got October off to a winning start with a 3–1 win against Preston North End at Hillsborough. This was followed by two consecutive draws - 1–1 against Hull City at Hillsborough and 0–0 away to Queens Park Rangers. The following game saw Sheffield Wednesday win 2–1 against local rivals Rotherham United at the New York Stadium thanks to a goal each from Fernando Forestieri and Lucas João respectively. The Owls' next game was a 3–0 victory over Premier League side Arsenal in the Capital One Cup at Hillsborough. To end the month The Owls won 1–0 at home against Nottingham Forest - thus completing the month unbeaten.

=== November ===
Wednesday started the month with a goalless draw with unbeaten in the league Brighton followed by a surprise 3–1 defeat against Charlton. After an international break Wednesday beat local rivals Huddersfield Town 3–1 with Kieran Lee scoring along with a Lucas João brace after Sean Scannell's opener for the Terriers. This result was followed by a 2–2 draw away at Blackburn - with Modou Sougou and Lucas João scoring for The Owls.

=== December ===
Two successive draws followed for The Wednesday - the first being 0–0 at home to Derby County. This was followed by a 2–2 draw away to Cardiff City - with a Fernando Forestieri goal and Barry Bannan's first goal for the club rescuing a point for The Owls. A 2–1 loss away at Milton Keynes Dons, in which Gary Hoopers consolation was his first for the club, was followed by a 4–1 thrashing of Wolverhampton Wanderers at Hillsborough - with a Fernando Forestieri brace and a goal each from Daniel Pudil and Gary Hooper earning all three points for The Owls. Sheffield Wednesday's last home match of 2015 saw them win 3–0 against Birmingham City - with another Fernando Forestieri brace and a goal from Kieran Lee securing the win. A 1–0 loss away to Middlesbrough was Sheffield Wednesday's last game of 2015 - ending the year in 7th place in the league table. A rotated side conceded after just 44 seconds to Christian Stuani, in a poor performance.

=== January ===
A Ross Wallace goal was enough for The Owls to get off to a winning start in 2016 with a 1–0 win at Craven Cottage against Fulham. They played the Londoners again the week after, winning again (2–1) making three wins over Fulham this campaign. Atdhe Nuhiu and Barry Bannan scored. Two successive wins followed against Bolton Wanderers (3–2) and Leeds United (2–0) - both at Hillsborough. Gary Hooper made his move to Hillsborough permanent in mid January from Norwich for a rumoured £3,000,000. Joe Bennett also joined on loan. Following those matches a 1–1 draw away to Reading saw The Owls end January unbeaten in the Championship. A 3–2 defeat away to Shrewsbury Town saw Sheffield Wednesday exit the FA Cup in the 4th round. Rhoys Wiggins and Sergiu Bus departed on deadline day to Bournemouth (£200,000) and US Salernitana (loan) respectively. Irish midfielder Aiden McGeady joined on loan from Everton.

=== February ===
February's first league match saw The Owls maintain their unbeaten run in the Championship with a 1–1 draw at home to Burnley - with Kieran Lee getting the equalising goal to earn a point for Sheffield Wednesday. The second match of the month was away at Birmingham, in which The Owls won 2–1, courtesy of two late Gary Hooper goals. This left them in the play-off positions. Next week they played Brentford, a 4–0 win ensued after an early red card to Yohan Barbet. A super goal by Gary Hooper was the pick of the bunch. At Deepdale, Sheffield Wednesday lost ground on the Automatic Promotion places with a 1–0 turnover to Preston North End. Joe Garner scored after Fernando Forestieri's second yellow card saw him sent off. On the following Tuesday, Atdhe Nuhiu scored a header and missed a penalty in a home draw to Queens Park Rangers. Daniel Toszer scored for the visitors. The final game of the month saw The Owls draw 0–0 away to Hull City.

=== March ===
The Owls got March off to a losing start by losing 1–0 at home to Rotherham United. A midweek 0–0 draw away to Brighton & Hove Albion was followed by a 3–0 win away to Nottingham Forest - keeping The Owls in the promotion play-off places. The following week saw the owls take on Charlton Athletic at home; they won the game 3–0 with all goals being scored in the second half. The month ended with The Owls 6th in the table - three points clear of Cardiff City.

=== April ===
The Owls won their first two games in April - with a 1–0 away win at Huddersfield and 2–1 home win against Blackburn Rovers. This was followed by a 4–1 loss at Bristol City and three consecutive draws against Ipswich Town and Milton Keynes Dons at home and Derby County away. A 3–0 victory over Cardiff City in the final home game of the season secured a promotion play-offs place for The Owls - with a brace from Gary Hooper (his first goals since the 3–0 victory over Nottingham Forest in March) and an own goal from Lee Peltier enough to secure all three points and sixth place for The Owls.

=== May ===
The result between Brighton and Derby on 2 May 2016 meant that Wednesday could not finish any higher than 6th on their final league game of the season against Wolverhampton Wanderers. The Owls' finished their league campaign with a 2–1 loss at The Molineux.

After a 3–1 aggregate victory over third placed Brighton and Hove Albion in the play-off semi final, The Wednesday were the first team to book their place in the play-off final at Wembley Stadium - a match that would mark Sheffield Wednesday's first appearance at the stadium since it was rebuilt. At the match though, Wednesday lost 1–0 to Hull City in front of over 41,000 Owls fans; a Mohamed Diamé goal winning the game for The Tigers, denying The Owls a first season in the top flight for 16 years.

== Players ==
=== Transfers in ===
Date from	Position	Nationality	Name	From	Fee	Ref.
1 July 2015	CB	CUR	Darryl Lachman	Twente	Undisclosed	
2 July 2015	CB	ENG	Brad Beatson	Academy	Trainee	
8 July 2015	RW	POR	Marco Matias	Nacional	Undisclosed	
9 July 2015	GK	WAL	Lewis Price	Free agent (Note: Price joins club following his release from Crystal Palace.)	Free transfer	
10 July 2015	LM	SCO	Ross Wallace	Free agent (Note: Wallace joins club following his release from Burnley.)	Free transfer	
16 July 2015	AM	ENG	Lewis McGugan	Watford	Undisclosed	
31 July 2015	ST	POR	Lucas João	Nacional	Undisclosed	
3 August 2015	RB	POR	Jonatas Centeno	Free agent (Note: Centeno joins club following his release from Arsenal.)	Free transfer	
5 August 2015	LB	WAL	Rhoys Wiggins	Charlton Athletic	Undisclosed	
5 August 2015	RW	SEN	Modou Sougou	Free agent (Note: Sougou joins club following his departure from Marseille.)	Free transfer	
29 August 2015	FW	ITA	Fernando Forestieri	Watford	Undisclosed	
31 August 2015	CM	SCO	Barry Bannan	Crystal Palace	Free transfer	
13 January 2016	RB	ENG	Jack Hunt	Crystal Palace	Undisclosed	
22 January 2016	FW	ENG	Gary Hooper	Norwich City	Undisclosed	

=== Transfers out ===
Date from	Position	Nationality	Name	To	Fee	Ref.
1 July 2015	RB	ENG	Lewis Buxton	Rotherham United (Note: Following Buxton's release he joined Rotherham United.)	Free transfer	
1 July 2015	CM	ENG	Giles Coke	Ipswich Town (Note: Following Coke's release he joined Ipswich Town.)	Released	
1 July 2015	CM	IRL	Paul Corry	Northampton Town (Note: Following Corry's release he joined Northampton Town.)	Free transfer	
1 July 2015	CB	POR	Rafael Floro	Belenenses (Note: Following Floro's release he joined Belenenses.)	Free transfer	
1 July 2015	CB	SVN	Dejan Kelhar	Olimpija Ljubljana (Note: Following Kelhar's release he joined Olimpija Ljubljana.)	Free transfer	
1 July 2015	CF	ENG	Gary Madine	Bolton Wanderers (Note: Following Madine's release he joined Bolton Wanderers.)	Free transfer	
1 July 2015	AM	COD	Jacques Maghoma	Birmingham City (Note: Following Maghoma's release he joined Birmingham City.)	Free transfer	
1 July 2015	LB	ENG	Joe Mattock	Rotherham United (Note: Following Mattock's release he joined Rotherham United.)	Free transfer	
1 July 2015	CM	SCO	Rhys McCabe	Dunfermline Athletic (Note: Following McCabe's release he joined Dunfermline Athletic.)	Free transfer	
1 July 2015	RB	ENG	Matt Young	Dover Athletic (Note: Following Young's release he joined Dover Athletic.)	Free transfer	
1 July 2015	CB	GUI	Kamil Zayatte	Al-Raed (Note: Following Zayatte's release he joined Al-Raed.)	Free transfer	
2 July 2015	GK	ENG	Chris Kirkland	Preston North End (Note: Following Kirkland's release he joined Preston North End.)	Free transfer	
2 July 2015	CF	SCO	Chris Maguire	Rotherham United (Note: Following Maguire's release he joined Rotherham United.)	Free transfer	
1 September 2015	CF	SCO	Stevie May	Preston North End	Undisclosed	
1 February 2016	LB	WAL	Rhoys Wiggins	Bournemouth	£200,000	

=== Loans in ===
Date from	Position	Nationality	Name	From	Date until	Ref.
1 July 2015	MF	FRA	Vincent Sasso	Braga	End of season	
3 July 2015	DF	ENG	Jack Hunt	Crystal Palace	13 January 2016	
10 July 2015	MF	ESP	Álex López	Celta de Vigo	End of season	
27 August 2015	DF	ENG	Michael Turner	Norwich City	End of season	
29 August 2015	DF	CZE	Daniel Pudil	Watford	End of season	
27 October 2015	FW	ENG	Gary Hooper	Norwich City	17 January 2016	
18 January 2016	DF	ENG	Joe Bennett	Aston Villa	End of season	
1 February 2016	MF	IRE	Aiden McGeady	Everton	End of Season	

=== Loans out ===
Date from	Position	Nationality	Name	To	Date until	Ref.
6 August 2015	RB	BEL	Marnick Vermijl	Preston North End	End of Season	
12 October 2015	FW	NIR	Caolan Lavery	Portsmouth	12 January 2016	
7 January 2016	CB	CUR	Darryl Lachman	SC Cambuur	End of Season	
2 February 2016	FW	ROU	Sergiu Buș	Salernitana	End of Season	
25 February 2016	LM	FRA	Jérémy Hélan	Wolves	End of Season	
26 February 2016	CB	FRA	Claude Dielna	Slovan Bratislava	End of Season	

=== New contracts ===
Date from	Position	Nationality	Name	Length	Expiry	Ref.
4 June 2015	CM	ENG	Kieran Lee	2 years	June 2017	
23 June 2015	DM	POR	José Semedo	1 year	June 2016	
30 June 2015	CB	NED	Glenn Loovens	1 year	June 2016	
31 July 2015	CB	ENG	Tom Lees	4 years	June 2019	
28 August 2015	GK	ENG	Cameron Dawson	2 years	June 2017	
28 August 2015	GK	ENG	Joe Wildsmith	2 years	June 2017	
2 September 2015	GK	IRE	Keiren Westwood	3 years	June 2018	
14 January 2016	MF	SCO	Barry Bannan	3½ years	June 2019	
14 January 2016	FW	AUT	Atdhe Nuhiu	2½ years	June 2018	
15 January 2016	DF	NED	Glenn Loovens	2½ years	June 2018	
15 January 2016	MF	ENG	Sam Hutchinson	2½ years	June 2018	

=== International call ups ===
No	Pos	Name	Team	Competition	Opposition	Date	Caps	Goals	Ref
13	FW	(Northern Ireland) Caolan Lavery	Northern Ireland	UEFA Euro 2016 qualifying	Faroe Islands (Hungary) Luxembourg	4–7 September 2015	0	0	
22	DF	(Curaçao) Darryl Lachman	Curaçao	FIFA World Cup Qualifiers	El Salvador; El Salvador	4–8 September 2015	4	1	
29	GK	(England) Joe Wildsmith	England U-20	Mercedes-Benz Elite Cup	Netherlands U-20; Turkey U-20; Germany U-20	7,10–13 October 2015	1	0	
29	GK	(England) Joe Wildsmith	England U21	UEFA Euro U-21 qualifier	(Netherlands) Kazakhstan U-21	7,10–13 October 2015	0	0	
29	GK	(England) Joe Wildsmith	England U21	UEFA Euro U-21 qualifier	(Bosnia and Herzegovina) Bosnia-Herzegovina U-21; Switzerland U-21	12–16 November 2015	0	0	
18	FW	(Portugal) Lucas João	Portugal	Friendly	(Bosnia and Herzegovina) Bosnia-Herzegovina	13–16 November 2015	2	0	
1	GK	(Republic of Ireland) Keiren Westwood	Republic of Ireland	UEFA Euro 2016 qualifying play-offs	Russia; Luxembourg	14–17 November 2015	18	0	
36	DF	(Czech Republic) Daniel Pudil	Czech Republic	Friendly	(Serbia) Scotland; Poland	13–17 November 2015	29	2	
29	GK	(England) Joe Wildsmith	England U21	UEFA Euro U-21 qualifier	(Bosnia and Herzegovina) Bosnia-Herzegovina U-21; Switzerland U-21	12–16 November 2015	0	0	
-	DF	(Northern Ireland) Josh Stachini	Northern Ireland U-19	UEFA Euro U-19 qualifier	Norway U-19; Russia U-19 (El Salvador) Slovakia U-19	12,14–16 November 2015	3	0	
—	FW	(England) George Hirst	England U-17	Algarve Tournament	Portugal U-17; Germany U-17; Netherlands U-17	5–9 February 2016	3	2	
36	DF	(Czech Republic) Daniel Pudil	Czech Republic	Friendly	Scotland; Sweden	24–29 March 2016	31	2	
41	MF	(Scotland) Barry Bannan	Scotland	Friendly	Czech Republic	24 March 2016	21	0	
29	GK	(England) Joe Wildsmith	England U21	UEFA Euro U-21 qualifier	Switzerland U-21	26 March 2016	0	0	
18	FW	(Portugal) Lucas João	Portugal U-23	Friendly	Mexico U-23	28 March 2016	0	0	
37	MF	(Republic of Ireland) Aiden McGeady	Republic of Ireland	Friendly	Switzerland (El Salvador) Slovakia	25–29 March 2016	81	5	
—	FW	(England) George Hirst	England U-17	UEFA Euro U-17	Sweden U-17; France U-17; Denmark U-17; Spain U-17	5–15 May 2016	7	3	
1	GK	(Republic of Ireland) Keiren Westwood	Republic of Ireland	Friendly	Netherlands; Belarus	23–31 May 2016	18	0	
37	MF	(Republic of Ireland) Aiden McGeady	Republic of Ireland	Friendly	Netherlands	23–27 May 2016	81	5	
41	MF	(Scotland) Barry Bannan	Scotland	Friendly	Italy; France	29 May–4 June 2016	21	0	
1	GK	(Republic of Ireland) Keiren Westwood	Republic of Ireland	UEFA Euro 2016	Sweden; Belgium; Italy	10 June–10 July 2016	18	0	
36	DF	(Czech Republic) Daniel Pudil	Czech Republic	UEFA Euro 2016	Spain; Croatia; Turkey	10 June–10 July 2016	31	2	

== Pre-season friendlies ==
On 18 June 2015, Sheffield Wednesday announced their pre-season schedule.

11 July 2015 Friendly	Alfreton Town	1–1	Sheffield Wednesday	North Street
15:00 BST	Heaton 72'	Report	Buș 49'	Attendance: 1,547; Referee: Nigel Smith

15 July 2015 Friendly	Ilkeston	0–1	Sheffield Wednesday	New Manor Ground
19:45 BST		Report	Matias 51'

18 July 2015 Friendly	York City	1–1	Sheffield Wednesday	Bootham Crescent
15:00 BST	McCoy 32'	Report	McGugan 81'	Attendance: 2,904; Referee: Ross Joyce

24 July 2015 Friendly	Braga	2–1	Sheffield Wednesday	Estádio da Nora
19:15 CEST	Pinho 8'; Alan 77'	Report	Sasso (yellow card) 31'; Lavery 68'

29 July 2015 Friendly	Scunthorpe United	4–2	Sheffield Wednesday	Glanford Park
19:45 BST	van Veen 14', 68'; Madden 26'; Wootton 89'	Report	Nuhiu 12'; Matias 21'	Referee: Seb Stockbridge

1 August 2015 Friendly	Sheffield Wednesday	5–0	St Mirren	Hillsborough
15:00 BST	Sasso 21'; Nuhiu 30', 49'; McGugan 40'; Vermijl 83'	Report		Attendance: 9,330; Referee: Craig Pawson

== Competitions ==
=== Championship ===
==== League table ====
Pos	Team	Pld	W	D	L	GF	GA	GD	Pts	Promotion, qualification or relegation
4	Hull City (O, P)	46	24	11	11	69	35	+34	83	Qualification for the Championship play-offs (Note: Four teams play for one spot and promotion to the Premier League.)
5	Derby County	46	21	15	10	66	43	+23	78	Qualification for the Championship play-offs
6	Sheffield Wednesday	46	19	17	10	66	45	+21	74	Qualification for the Championship play-offs
7	Ipswich Town	46	18	15	13	53	51	+2	69	
8	Cardiff City	46	17	17	12	56	51	+5	68	

Source: BBC Sport
Rules for classification: 1) Points; 2) Goal difference; 3) Number of goals scored
(O) Play-off winners; (P) Promoted

==== Results summary ====
Overall								Home						Away					
Pld	W	D	L	GF	GA	GD	Pts	W	D	L	GF	GA	GD	W	D	L	GF	GA	GD
46	19	17	10	66	45	+21	74	13	8	2	42	17	+25	6	9	8	24	28	−4

Last updated: 7 May 2016.
Source: Championship

==== Results by round ====
Round	1	2	3	4	5	6	7	8	9	10	11	12	13	14	15	16	17	18	19	20	21	22	23	24	25	26	27	28	29	30	31	32	33	34	35	36	37	38	39	40	41	42	43	44	45	46
Ground	H	A	H	A	H	A	A	H	A	H	H	A	A	H	H	A	H	A	H	A	A	H	H	A	A	H	H	A	H	A	H	A	H	A	H	A	A	H	A	H	A	H	H	A	H	A
Result	W	L	D	D	L	L	D	W	W	W	D	D	W	W	D	L	W	D	D	D	L	W	W	L	W	W	W	D	D	W	W	L	D	D	L	D	W	W	W	W	L	D	D	D	W	L
Position	4	10	11	8	15	19	18	14	11	10	9	9	9	8	7	9	8	8	7	8	9	7	7	7	7	7	6	6	7	6	5	6	5	6	6	6	6	6	5	5	6	6	6	6	6	6

Updated to match(es) played on 7 May 2016. Source: BBC Sport
A = Away; H = Home; W = Win; D = Draw; L = Loss

==== Matches ====
On 17 June 2015, the fixtures for the forthcoming season were announced.

8 August 2015 1	Sheffield Wednesday	2–0	Bristol City	Owlerton, Sheffield
15:00 BST	Wallace (yellow card) 43'; Lees 60'; McGugan 71'	Report	Fredericks (yellow card) 43'; Pack (yellow card) 65'; Wilbraham (yellow card) 90+7'	Stadium: Hillsborough; Attendance: 23,255; Referee: James Adcock

15 August 2015 2	Ipswich Town	2–1	Sheffield Wednesday	Ipswich
15:00 BST	Douglas (yellow card) 4'; Sears 21'; Smith 53'; Fraser (yellow card) 70'	Report	Wallace 19'; Hutchinson (yellow card) 50'; López (yellow card) 70'	Stadium: Portman Road; Attendance: 20,081; Referee: James Linington

19 August 2015 3	Sheffield Wednesday	1–1	Reading	Owlerton, Sheffield
19:45 BST	Matias (yellow card) 32'; Hutchinson (yellow card) 65'; Sougou 90'	Report	Tshibola (yellow card) 26'; Williams 49'; Hector (yellow card) 90+3'	Stadium: Hillsborough; Attendance: 20,247; Referee: Paul Tierney

22 August 2015 4	Leeds United	1–1	Sheffield Wednesday	Holbeck, Leeds
12:30 BST	Phillips (yellow card) 2'; Berardi (yellow card) 22'; Wood 61'	Report	Matias 37'; Lees (yellow card) 43'; Sougou (yellow card) 52'; Hutchinson (yellow card) 73'; Hélan (yellow card) 81'	Stadium: Elland Road; Attendance: 22,597; Referee: Mike Jones

29 August 2015 5	Sheffield Wednesday	1–3	Middlesbrough	Owlerton, Sheffield
15:00 BST	Matias 64'; López (yellow card) 73'; Matias (yellow card) 89'	Report	Gibson (yellow card) 28'; Reach 42'; Clayton (yellow card) 45+2'; Fabbrini 67'; Nsue (yellow card) 75'; Stuani 86'	Stadium: Hillsborough; Attendance: 20,976; Referee: Mark Heywood

12 September 2015 6	Burnley	3–1	Sheffield Wednesday	Burnley
15:00 BST	Jones 7'; Taylor 78'; Gray 90+1'	Report	Nuhiu 20'; Bannan (yellow card) 80'; Hutchinson (yellow card) 89'	Stadium: Turf Moor; Attendance: 17,277; Referee: Stephen Martin

15 September 2015 7	Bolton Wanderers	0–0	Sheffield Wednesday	Horwich, Bolton
20:00 BST	Moxey (yellow card) 54'; Davies (yellow card) 57'	Report	Hunt (yellow card) 62'; Sougou (yellow card) 68'; Hutchinson (yellow card) 70'; Forestieri (yellow card) 80'	Stadium: Macron Stadium; Attendance: 14,438; Referee: Peter Bankes

19 September 2015 8	Sheffield Wednesday	3–2	Fulham	Owlerton, Sheffield
15:00 BST	Forestieri 13'; López (yellow card) 23'; Lees 37'; Turner 50'	Report	O'Hara 31', (yellow card) 90+1'; Cairney 67'; Burn (yellow card) 79'	Stadium: Hillsborough; Attendance: 18,706; Referee: Simon Hooper

26 September 2015 9	Brentford	1–2	Sheffield Wednesday	Brentford, London
15:00 BST	McCormack (yellow card) 28'; Tarkowski (red card) 36'; Judge 77'; Button (yellow card) 90+3'	Report	Nuhiu 37' (pen.); Hélan (yellow card) 65' (yellow-red card) 78'; Hutchinson (yellow card) 80'; João 90'	Stadium: Griffin Park; Attendance: 9,756; Referee: Geoff Eltringham

3 October 2015 10	Sheffield Wednesday	3–1	Preston North End	Owlerton, Sheffield
15:00 BST	Lee 45+1'; Pudil 55'; McGugan 90+6'	Report	Browne 76'; Johnson (yellow card) 89'	Stadium: Hillsborough; Attendance: 20,383; Referee: Andy Woolmer

17 October 2015 11	Sheffield Wednesday	1–1	Hull City	Owlerton, Sheffield
12:30 BST	Forestieri 28'; Hutchinson (yellow card) 31'; Hunt (yellow card) 56'	Report	Diamé (yellow card) 34'; Hernández 51'; Clucas (yellow card) 63'	Stadium: Hillsborough; Attendance: 20,389; Referee: Keith Stroud

20 October 2015 12	QPR	0–0	Sheffield Wednesday	Shepherd's Bush, London
19:45 BST	Sandro (yellow card) 9'	Report		Stadium: Loftus Road; Attendance: 15,471; Referee: Andy Haines

23 October 2015 13	Rotherham United	1–2	Sheffield Wednesday	Rotherham
19:45 BST	Clarke-Harris (yellow card) 51'; Derbyshire (yellow card) 81'; Thorpe 90+5'	Report	Hunt (yellow card) 45+1'; João 46'; Forestieri 50'; Bannan (yellow card) 69'; Hutchinson (yellow card) 76'; Pudil (yellow card) 89'	Stadium: New York Stadium; Attendance: 11,658; Referee: Mike Jones

31 October 2015 14	Sheffield Wednesday	1–0	Nottingham Forest	Owlerton, Sheffield
15:00 GMT	Bannan (yellow card) 46'; Forestieri 68', (yellow card) 78'; Lee (yellow card) 69'	Report	Vaughan (yellow card) 30'; Ward (yellow card) 41'; Burke (yellow card) 56'; Mills (yellow card) 74'	Stadium: Hillsborough; Attendance: 22,465; Referee: Jeremy Simpson

3 November 2015 15	Sheffield Wednesday	0–0	Brighton & Hove Albion	Owlerton, Sheffield
19:45 GMT		Report		Stadium: Hillsborough; Attendance: 23,712; Referee: Kevin Wright

7 November 2015 16	Charlton Athletic	3–1	Sheffield Wednesday	Charlton, London
15:00 GMT	Jackson 26'; Makienok 45'; Ghoochannejhad 55'; Ba (yellow card) 60'; Fox (yellow card) 70'	Report	Hutchinson (yellow card) 31'; Forestieri (yellow card) 55', (goal) 73'; Bannan (yellow card) 64'	Stadium: The Valley; Attendance: 16,267; Referee: Gavin Ward

21 November 2015 17	Sheffield Wednesday	3–1	Huddersfield Town	Owlerton, Sheffield
15:00 GMT	Hélan (yellow card) 30'; Pudil (yellow card) 59'; João 78', 90+3'; Lee 83'	Report	Bunn (yellow card) 27'; Whitehead (yellow card) 38'; Scannell 53'	Stadium: Hillsborough; Attendance: 21,191; Referee: Carl Boyeson

28 November 2015 18	Blackburn Rovers	2–2	Sheffield Wednesday	Blackburn
15:00 GMT	Akpan 5'; Evans (yellow card) 31', (goal) 44'	Report	Hélan (yellow card) 31'; Lee (yellow card) 38'; Sougou 39'; João 84'	Stadium: Ewood Park; Attendance: 15,837; Referee: Fred Graham

6 December 2015 19	Sheffield Wednesday	0–0	Derby County	Owlerton, Sheffield
13:15 GMT	López (yellow card) 31'; Hutchinson (yellow card) 53'; Pudil (yellow card) 70'; Forestieri (yellow card) 90+2'	Report	Thorne (yellow card) 23'; Butterfield (yellow card) 30'	Stadium: Hillsborough; Attendance: 19,252; Referee: Graham Scott

12 December 2015 20	Cardiff City	2–2	Sheffield Wednesday	Leckwith, Cardiff
15:00 GMT	Peltier (yellow card) 4'; Noone 21' (pen.); Pilkington 34'; Ralls (yellow card) 71'; Morrison (yellow card) 72'	Report	Forestieri 61'; Bannan 76'; Loovens (yellow card) 78'	Stadium: Cardiff City Stadium; Attendance: 14,526; Referee: Charles Breakspear

15 December 2015 21	Milton Keynes Dons	2–1	Sheffield Wednesday	Denbigh, Milton Keynes
19:45 GMT	Baker 25'; Maynard 50'	Report	Forestieri (yellow card) 35'; López (yellow card) 43'; Hooper 77'	Stadium: Stadium mk Attendance: 11,422; Referee: Darren Deadman

20 December 2015 22	Sheffield Wednesday	4–1	Wolverhampton Wanderers	Owlerton, Sheffield
14:00 GMT	Forestieri 20' (pen.), 25'; Pudil 59'; Hooper 90'	Report	Afobe 16' (pen.); Price (yellow card) 31'; McDonald (yellow card) 42'	Stadium: Hillsborough; Attendance: 19,529; Referee: Dean Whitestone

26 December 2015 23	Sheffield Wednesday	3–0	Birmingham City	Owlerton, Sheffield
15:00 GMT	Forestieri 37', 48'; Lee 39'	Report	Maghoma (yellow card) 43'; Caddis (yellow card) 83'	Stadium: Hillsborough; Attendance: 28,523; Referee: Tony Harrington

28 December 2015 24	Middlesbrough	1–0	Sheffield Wednesday	Middlesbrough
17:15 GMT	Stuani 1'; Clayton (yellow card) 34'	Report	Palmer (yellow card) 37'; Bannan (yellow card) 60'; Lucas João (yellow card) 77'; Loovens (yellow card) 79'	Stadium: Riverside Stadium; Attendance: 29,363; Referee: David Coote

2 January 2016 25	Fulham	0–1	Sheffield Wednesday	Fulham, London
15:00 GMT	Burn (yellow card) 60'; McCormack (yellow card) 78'	Report	Wallace 29'; Bannan (yellow card) 45+2'	Stadium: Craven Cottage; Attendance: 19,263; Referee: Kevin Johnson

12 January 2016 26	Sheffield Wednesday	3–2	Bolton Wanderers	Owlerton, Sheffield
19:45 GMT	Forestieri 14'; Hooper 52', 77'; Hunt (yellow card) 61'; Bannan (yellow card) 90+5'	Report	Trotter (yellow card) 25'; Madine 19'; Wheater 62'	Stadium: Hillsborough; Attendance: 20,757; Referee: Simon Hooper

16 January 2016 27	Sheffield Wednesday	2–0	Leeds United	Owlerton, Sheffield
12:30 GMT	Hutchinson (yellow card) 34'; Hooper 47', 50'; Pudil (yellow card) 74'	Report	Bellusci (yellow card) 37'; Cook (yellow card) 55'	Stadium: Hillsborough; Attendance: 23,909; Referee: Anthony Taylor

23 January 2016 28	Reading	1–1	Sheffield Wednesday	Reading
15:00 GMT	Cooper 74'	Report	Hooper 10'; Hunt (yellow card) 29'; Lee (yellow card) 64'	Stadium: Madejski Stadium; Attendance: 18,972; Referee: Steve Martin

2 February 2016 29	Sheffield Wednesday	1–1	Burnley	Owlerton, Sheffield
19:45 GMT	Lee 48', (yellow card) 83'	Report	Gray 3'; Barton (yellow card) 32'; Keane (yellow card) 84'	Stadium: Hillsborough; Attendance: 19,762; Referee: Andy Woolmer

6 February 2016 30	Birmingham City	1–2	Sheffield Wednesday	Bordesley, Birmingham
15:00 GMT	Donaldson 45+5'; Vaughan (yellow card) 90+2'; Morrison (yellow card) 90+3'	Report	McGugan (yellow card) 45'; Pudil (yellow card) 70'; Hooper 77', 79'; Wallace (yellow card) 90+3'	Stadium: St Andrew's; Attendance: 20,302; Referee: James Adcock

13 February 2016 31	Sheffield Wednesday	4–0	Brentford	Owlerton, Sheffield
15:00 GMT	Forestieri 12'; Hooper 30'; Lee 45'; João 89'	Report	Barbet (red card) 5'	Stadium: Hillsborough; Attendance: 20,921; Referee: Scott Duncan

20 February 2016 32	Preston North End	1–0	Sheffield Wednesday	Deepdale, Preston
15:00 GMT	Woods (yellow card) 42'; Wright (yellow card) 57'; Cunningham (yellow card) 59'; Garner 73'	Report	Bannan (yellow card) 30'; Forestieri (yellow card) 49' (yellow-red card) 66'; Pudil (yellow card) 90+6'	Stadium: Deepdale; Attendance: 16,923; Referee: Keith Stroud

23 February 2016 33	Sheffield Wednesday	1–1	QPR	Owlerton, Sheffield
19:45 GMT	Nuhiu 63'; Wallace (yellow card) 73'	Report	Tőzsér 57'; Phillips (yellow card) 76'	Stadium: Hillsborough; Attendance: 19,233; Referee: Andy Davies

26 February 2016 34	Hull City	0–0	Sheffield Wednesday	Kingston upon Hull
19:45 GMT		Report	Bennett (yellow card) 56'; Forestieri (yellow card) 85' (yellow-red card) 90+1'	Stadium: KC Stadium; Attendance: N/A; Referee: Tim Robinson

5 March 2016 35	Sheffield Wednesday	0–1	Rotherham United	Owlerton, Sheffield
15:00 GMT		Report	Derbyshire 21'	Stadium: Hillsborough; Attendance: 28,912; Referee: Chris Kavanagh

8 March 2016 36	Brighton & Hove Albion	0–0	Sheffield Wednesday	Falmer, Brighton and Hove
19:45 GMT	Stephens (yellow card) 60'	Report	João (yellow card) 36'; Matias (yellow card) 79'	Stadium: Falmer Stadium; Attendance: 26,128; Referee: Darren Drysdale

12 March 2016 37	Nottingham Forest	0–3	Sheffield Wednesday	West Bridgford
15:00 GMT		Report	McGeady 30'; Hooper 62'; Bannan (red card) 76'; Matias 85'	Stadium: City Ground; Attendance: 20,690; Referee: Graham Scott

19 March 2016 38	Sheffield Wednesday	3–0	Charlton Athletic	Owlerton, Sheffield
15:00 GMT	Hutchinson (yellow card) 35'; Wallace (yellow card) 57'; Lees 64'; Forestieri 70'; Ba 77' (o.g.)	Report	Fanni (yellow card) 31'; Ba (yellow card) 75'; Harriott (yellow card) 90+2'	Stadium: Hillsborough; Attendance: 29,668; Referee: Stuart Attwell

2 April 2016 39	Huddersfield Town	0–1	Sheffield Wednesday	Huddersfield
15:00 BST	Hudson (yellow card) 44'	Report	Loovens (yellow card) 32'; Forestieri 83'	Stadium: John Smith's Stadium; Attendance: 15,469; Referee: Iain Williamson

5 April 2016 40	Sheffield Wednesday	2–1	Blackburn Rovers	Owlerton, Sheffield
19:45 BST	Henley 51' (o.g.); Lee (yellow card) 58'; Wallace 62'	Report	Conway 46', (red card) 53'	Stadium: Hillsborough; Attendance: 21,803; Referee: David Webb

9 April 2016 41	Bristol City	4–1	Sheffield Wednesday	Bristol
15:00 GMT	Palmer 10' (o.g.); Reid 13'; Tomlin 42' (pen.); Kodjia 52' (pen.); Flint (yellow card) 73'	Report	O'Donnell 61' (o.g.); Matias (yellow card) 79'	Stadium: Ashton Gate Stadium; Attendance: 15,854; Referee: Charles Breakspear

16 April 2016 42	Sheffield Wednesday	1–1	Ipswich Town	Owlerton, Sheffield
15:00 BST	Forestieri 42'; Wallace (yellow card) 69'	Report	Bru (yellow card) 69'; Dozzell 71'; Pitman (yellow card) 79'; Chambers (yellow card) 90+4'	Stadium: Hillsborough; Attendance: 25,082; Referee: Bobby Madley

19 April 2016 43	Sheffield Wednesday	0–0	Milton Keynes Dons	Owlerton, Sheffield
19:45 BST	Lees (yellow card) 78'; Hooper (yellow card) 79'; Forestieri (yellow card) 81'; Wallace (red card) 83'; Pudil (yellow card) 87'	Report	Maynard (yellow card) 90+1'	Stadium: Hillsborough; Attendance: 20,220; Referee: Peter Bankes

23 April 2016 44	Derby County	1–1	Sheffield Wednesday	Derby
12:30 BST	Hughes (yellow card) 19'; Bryson (yellow card) 48'; Martin (yellow card) 73'; Keogh (yellow card) 77'; Butterfield (yellow card) 80'; Bent 82'	Report	Lee (yellow card) 54'; Bannan 69'; Forestieri (yellow card) 79'; Hélan (yellow card) 88'; Pudil (yellow card) 90+5'	Stadium: Pride Park Stadium; Attendance: 31,825; Referee: Lee Mason

30 April 2016 45	Sheffield Wednesday	3–0	Cardiff City	Owlerton, Sheffield
15:00 BST	Forestieri (yellow card) 31'; Hooper 64', 90+4'; Peltier 75' (o.g.)	Report	O'Keefe (yellow card) 24'; Connolly (yellow card) 54'; Malone (yellow card) 74'	Stadium: Hillsborough; Attendance: 31,843; Referee: Paul Tierney

7 May 2016 46	Wolverhampton Wanderers	2–1	Sheffield Wednesday	Wolverhampton
12:30 BST	Turner 7' (o.g.); Saville 35'	Report	McGugan 90' (pen.)	Stadium: Molineux Stadium; Attendance: 25,488; Referee: Darren Bond

=== League Cup ===
On 16 June 2015, the first round draw was made, Sheffield Wednesday were drawn at home against Mansfield Town. Following this The Owls were later drawn at home against Oxford United, away against Newcastle United, home against Arsenal and away against Stoke City.

11 August 2015 1st round	Sheffield Wednesday	4–1	Mansfield Town	Owlerton, Sheffield
19:45 BST	João 13'; Semedo 19'; Lee 53'; Palmer (yellow card) 79'; Sougou 84'	Report	Tafazolli 45'; Chapman (yellow card) 90'	Stadium: Hillsborough; Attendance: 14,021; Referee: Mark Brown

25 August 2015 2nd round	Sheffield Wednesday	1–0	Oxford United	Owlerton, Sheffield
19:45 BST	Lees (yellow card) 47'; Nuhiu 55'; Lee (yellow card) 77'; Sougou (yellow card) 89'	Report	Dunkley (yellow card) 29'	Stadium: Hillsborough; Attendance: 11,799; Referee: David Webb

23 September 2015 3rd round	Newcastle United	0–1	Sheffield Wednesday	Newcastle-upon-Tyne
19:45 BST	Mbabu (yellow card) 61'; Pérez (yellow card) 75'	Report	Matias (yellow card) 61'; McGugan 76', (yellow card) 90+3'	Stadium: St James' Park; Attendance: 33,986; Referee: Chris Kavanagh

27 October 2015 4th round	Sheffield Wednesday	3–0	Arsenal	Owlerton, Sheffield
19:45 GMT	Wallace 27', (yellow card) 45+4'; João 40'; Hutchinson (yellow card) 30', (goal) 51'; Loovens (yellow card) 59'	Report	Debuchy (yellow card) 59'; Campbell (yellow card) 86'	Stadium: Hillsborough; Attendance: 35,065; Referee: Graham Scott

1 December 2015 5th round	Stoke City	2–0	Sheffield Wednesday	Stoke-on-Trent
19:45 GMT	Afellay 30' van Ginkel (yellow card) 60'; Bardsley 75'	Report	Sougou (yellow card) 30'	Stadium: Britannia Stadium; Attendance: 26,779; Referee: Mark Clattenburg

=== FA Cup ===
Sheffield Wednesday competed in the FA Cup from the third round. After a 2–1 victory over Fulham at home The Owls were drawn away against Shrewsbury Town - a match that the Wednesday lost 3–2 after 95th minute winning goal.

9 January 2016 3rd round	Sheffield Wednesday	2–1	Fulham	Owlerton, Sheffield
15:00 GMT	Bannan 42'; Nuhiu 73'	Report	Richards (yellow card) 9'; Woodrow (yellow card) 18'; Dembele 43'	Stadium: Hillsborough; Attendance: 15,244; Referee: Gavin Ward

30 January 2016 4th round	Shrewsbury Town	3–2	Sheffield Wednesday	Shrewsbury
15:00 GMT	Grimmer (yellow card) 37', (goal) 90+5'; Akpa Akpro 56'; Knight-Percival (yellow card) 68'; Whalley 87'; João (yellow card) 89'	Report	McGugan 19', 76'; Nuhiu (yellow card) 84'	Stadium: New Meadow; Attendance: 5,699; Referee: Paul Tierney

=== Football League play-offs ===
As a result of The Owls finishing in sixth place in the Championship they qualified for the Football League play-offs. In the play-off semi finals Sheffield Wednesday played against third placed team Brighton and Hove Albion - winning 3–1 on aggregate to reach the play-off final. In the final, Wednesday lost 1–0 to Hull City who went straight back up to the Premier League after being relegated the previous season.

13 May 2016 Semi final (1st leg)	Sheffield Wednesday	2–0	Brighton & Hove Albion	Owlerton, Sheffield
19:45 BST	Wallace (yellow card) 29', (goal) 45'; Pudil (yellow card) 68'; Lee 73'; Matias (yellow card) 90+1'	Report	Bruno (yellow card) 51'; Kayal (yellow card) 90+2'	Stadium: Hillsborough; Attendance: 34,260; Referee: Andre Marriner

16 May 2016 Semi final (2nd leg)	Brighton & Hove Albion	1–1 (1–3 agg.)	Sheffield Wednesday	Falmer, Brighton and Hove
19:45 BST	Dunk 19'; Kayal (yellow card) 56'; Knockaert (yellow card) 63'; Bruno (yellow card) 82'	Report	Lees (yellow card) 13'; Wallace 28'; Hutchinson (yellow card) 55'; Hunt (yellow card) 59'; Nuhiu (yellow card) 85'	Stadium: Falmer Stadium; Attendance: 27,272; Referee: Roger East

28 May 2016 Final	Sheffield Wednesday	0–1	Hull City	Wembley, London
17:00 BST		Report	Dawson (yellow card) 10'; Diamé 72'	Stadium: Wembley Stadium; Attendance: 70,189; Referee: Bobby Madley

== Squad statistics ==
=== Appearances ===
As of 28 May 2016

No.	Pos	Nat	Player	Total		Championship		FA Cup		League Cup	
No.	Pos	Nat	Player	Apps	Goals	Apps	Goals	Apps	Goals	Apps	Goals
1	GK	(Republic of Ireland) IRL	Keiren Westwood	37	0	37	0	0	0	0	0
2	DF	(Scotland) SCO	Liam Palmer	19	0	13+2	0	2	0	2	0
3	DF	(England) ENG	Michael Turner	12	1	11	1	1	0	0	0
4	MF	(England) ENG	Sam Hutchinson	30	1	26+1	0	0	0	2+1	1
5	DF	(Netherlands) NED	Glenn Loovens	38	0	34	0	1	0	3	0
6	MF	(Portugal) POR	José Semedo	15	1	7+3	0	1+1	0	2+1	1
7	FW	(Portugal) POR	Marco Matias	22	3	9+9	3	1	0	1+2	0
9	FW	(Austria) AUT	Atdhe Nuhiu	49	5	22+21	3	0+2	1	1+3	1
10	MF	(England) ENG	Lewis McGugan	17	6	5+8	3	1	2	1+2	1
12	DF	(England) ENG	Joe Bennett	4	0	3	0	1	0	0	0
13	FW	(Northern Ireland) NIR	Caolan Lavery	2	0	0	0	0	0	2	0
14	FW	(England) ENG	Gary Hooper	33	13	25+6	13	1	0	1	0
15	DF	(England) ENG	Tom Lees	42	3	37	3	0	0	5	0
17	MF	(France) FRA	Jérémy Hélan	27	0	6+16	0	0+1	0	3+1	0
18	FW	(Portugal) POR	Lucas João	48	8	15+27	6	2	0	4	2
20	MF	(England) ENG	Kieran Lee	52	6	43+3	5	1+1	0	4	1
21	MF	(Spain) ESP	Álex López	27	0	16+8	0	1	0	2	0
23	DF	(France) FRA	Vincent Sasso	18	0	11+3	0	2	0	2	0
24	MF	(Senegal) SEN	Modou Sougou	15	3	5+4	2	2	0	3+1	1
28	GK	(England) ENG	Joe Wildsmith	14	0	8+1	0	1	0	4	0
29	FW	(England) ENG	Jack Stobbs	1	0	0+1	0	0	0	0	0
32	DF	(England) ENG	Jack Hunt	40	0	36+1	0	0	0	3	0
33	MF	(Scotland) SCO	Ross Wallace	48	6	37+6	5	2	0	3	1
34	GK	(Wales) WAL	Lewis Price	7	0	4+1	0	1	0	1	0
36	DF	(Czech Republic) CZE	Daniel Pudil	42	2	38+1	2	1	0	1+1	0
37	MF	(Republic of Ireland) IRL	Aiden McGeady	13	1	10+3	1	0	0	0	0
41	MF	(Scotland) SCO	Barry Bannan	40	3	37	2	1	1	1+1	0
45	FW	(Italy) ITA	Fernando Forestieri	39	15	38+1	15	0	0	0	0
Out on loan
11	FW	(Romania) ROU	Sergiu Buș	3	0	0+2	0	0	0	0+1	0
Players no longer at the club
16	DF	(Wales) WAL	Rhoys Wiggins	9	0	5+1	0	0	0	3	0

=== Goalscorers ===
Includes all competitive matches.

As of 16 May 2016

Rank	Pos.	Nationality	No.	Player	Championship	FA Cup	League Cup	Total
1	FW	(Italy)	45	Fernando Forestieri	15	0	0	15
2	FW	(England)	14	Gary Hooper	13	0	0	13
3	FW	(Portugal)	18	Lucas João	6	0	2	8
4	MF	(England)	20	Kieran Lee	5	0	1	6
4	MF	(England)	10	Lewis McGugan	3	2	1	6
4	MF	(Scotland)	33	Ross Wallace	5	0	1	6
5	FW	(Austria)	9	Atdhe Nuhiu	3	1	1	5
6	MF	(Scotland)	41	Barry Bannan	2	1	0	3
6	DF	(England)	15	Tom Lees	3	0	0	3
6	FW	(Portugal)	7	Marco Matias	3	0	0	3
6	MF	(Senegal)	24	Modou Sougou	2	0	1	3
7	DF	(Czech Republic)	36	Daniel Pudil	2	0	0	2
8	MF	(England)	4	Sam Hutchinson	0	0	1	1
8	MF	(Republic of Ireland)	37	Aiden McGeady	1	0	0	1
8	MF	(Portugal)	6	José Semedo	0	0	1	1
8	DF	(England)	3	Michael Turner	1	0	0	1
Own Goals					4	0	0	4

=== Disciplinary record ===
As of 16 May 2016

No.	Pos.	Name	Championship		FA Cup		League Cup		Total	
No.	Pos.	Name	Booked	Sent off (straight red)	Booked	Sent off (straight red)	Booked	Sent off (straight red)	Booked	Sent off (straight red)
45	MF	Fernando Forestieri	10	2	0	0	0	0	10	2
41	MF	Barry Bannan	8	1	0	0	0	0	8	1
33	MF	Ross Wallace	6	1	0	0	1	0	7	1
17	MF	Jérémy Hélan	5	1	0	0	0	0	5	1
4	MF	Sam Hutchinson	11	0	0	0	2	0	13	0
36	DF	Daniel Pudil	9	0	0	0	0	0	9	0
32	DF	Jack Hunt	7	0	0	0	0	0	7	0
20	MF	Kieran Lee	6	0	0	0	1	0	7	0
21	MF	Álex López	5	0	0	0	0	0	5	0
7	FW	Marco Matias	5	0	0	0	1	0	6	0
5	DF	Glenn Loovens	4	0	0	0	1	0	5	0
24	MF	Modou Sougou	2	0	0	0	2	0	4	0
18	FW	Lucas João	2	0	1	0	0	0	3	0
15	DF	Tom Lees	2	0	0	0	1	0	3	0
10	MF	Lewis McGugan	1	0	0	0	1	0	2	0
9	FW	Atdhe Nuhiu	1	0	1	0	0	0	2	0
2	DF	Liam Palmer	1	0	0	0	1	0	2	0
12	DF	Joe Bennett	1	0	0	0	0	0	1	0
14	FW	Gary Hooper	0	0	1	0	0	0	1	0

== Awards ==
=== Player of the Month ===
Player of the Month awards for the 2015–16 season.

Month	First	%	Second	%	Third	%	Ref
August	(Portugal) Marco Matias	30%	(England) Kieran Lee	15%	(England) Sam Hutchinson (England) Jack Hunt	11%	
September	(England) Kieran Lee	28%	(Austria) Atdhe Nuhiu	24%	(Scotland) Ross Wallace	15%	
October	(Scotland) Barry Bannan	31%	(Italy) Fernando Forestieri	16%	(England) Sam Hutchinson	13%	
November	(Portugal) Lucas João	69%	(Italy) Fernando Forestieri	17%	(England) Kieran Lee	7%	
December	(Italy) Fernando Forestieri	84%	N/A	–	N/A	–	
January	(England) Gary Hooper	62%	(Scotland) Barry Bannan	17%	(Italy) Fernando Forestieri	10%	
February	(England) Gary Hooper	26.5%	(Scotland) Barry Bannan	26.1%	(Austria) Atdhe Nuhiu	15%	
March	(England) Tom Lees	30%	(Austria) Atdhe Nuhiu	–	(Scotland) Barry Bannan	–	
April	(Spain) Álex López	39%	(Scotland) Barry Bannan	13%	(Italy) Fernando Forestieri	10%	

=== Player of the Season ===
The Player of the Season award was announced on 18 May 2016.

First	%	Second	%	Third	%	Ref
(Italy) Fernando Forestieri	52%	(Scotland) Barry Bannan	–	(England) Kieran Lee	–	

=== Other awards ===
- PFA Fans' Player of the Month (September): Ross Wallace
- PFA Fans' Player of the Month (October): Fernando Forestieri
- PFA Fans' Player of the Month (April): Fernando Forestieri
- PFA Championship Team of the Year: Barry Bannan
- Owls Foundation Player of the Year: Fernando Forestieri
