= Sylla Sow =

Dutch footballer (born 1996)

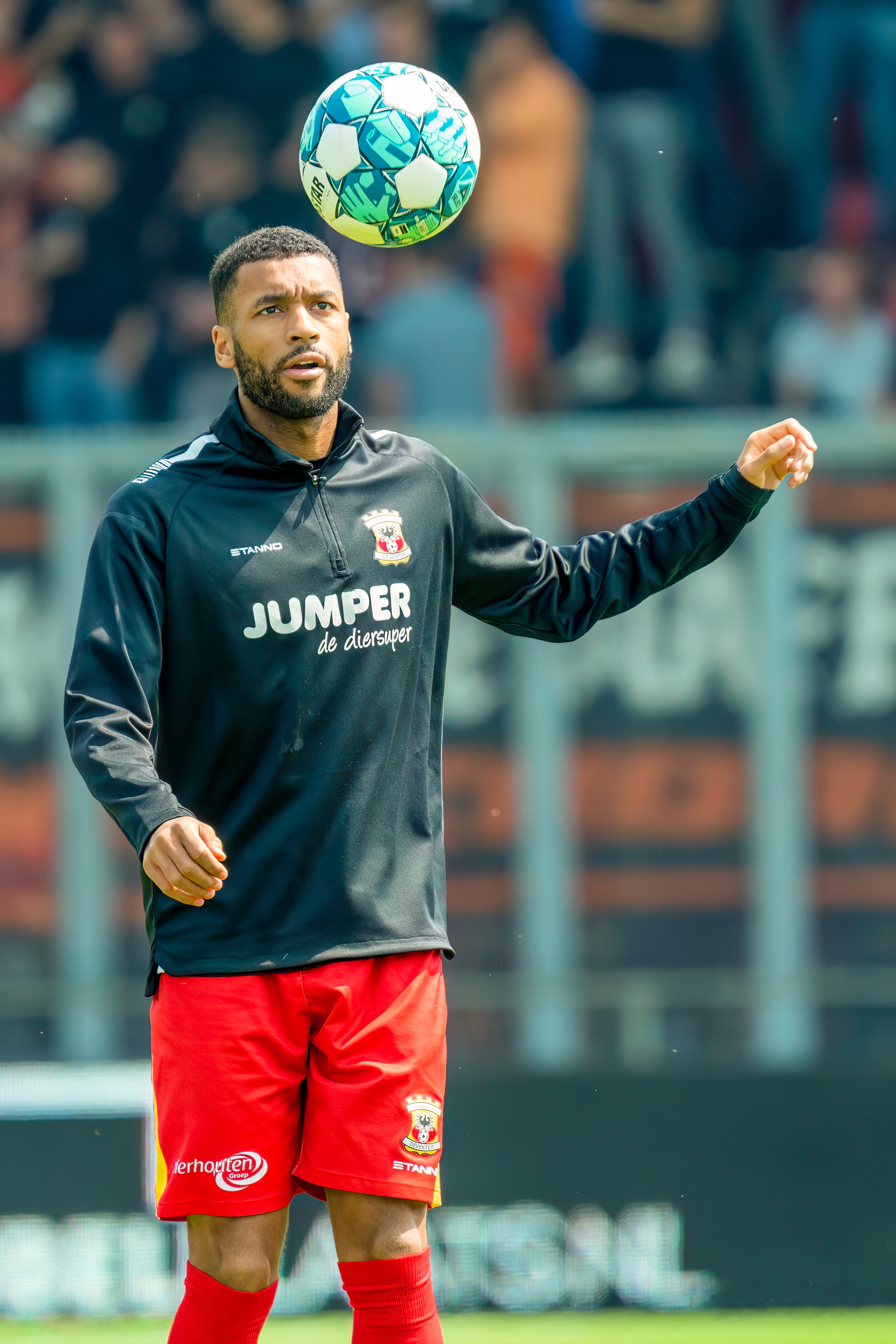
- Sow playing for Go Ahead Eagles in 2023

Personal information
- Date of birth: 8 August 1996 (age 30)
- Place of birth: Nijmegen, Netherlands
- Height: 1.82 m (6 ft 0 in)
- Position: Winger

Team information
- Current team: Al-Ula
- Number: 91

Youth career
- Quick 1888
- 2007–2015: NEC
- 2015–2016: Utrecht

Senior career*
Years	Team	Apps	(Gls)
2016–2019	Jong Utrecht	95	(23)
2017–2019	Utrecht	1	(0)
2019–2021	RKC Waalwijk	48	(7)
2021–2022	Sheffield Wednesday	15	(2)
2022–2024	Go Ahead Eagles	42	(6)
2024	NEC	16	(2)
2024–2025	Al-Najma	31	(12)
2025–2026	Abha	33	(27)
2026–	Al-Ula	5	(2)
- * Club domestic league appearances and goals as of 13:16, 15 September 2026 (UTC)

Sylla Sow (born 8 August 1996) is a Dutch professional footballer who plays as a winger for Saudi First Division League club Al-Ula.

== Club career ==
Sow made his professional debut in the Eerste Divisie for Jong FC Utrecht on 5 August 2016 in a game against NAC Breda.

On 29 April 2018, Sow made his debut in the Eredivisie for FC Utrecht in a match against Heracles Almelo, which ended in a 2–2 draw. He came on as a substitute in the 81st minute for Urby Emanuelson, but was unable to score. Thereby, he became the third player from the youth academy to have made his debut in the Eredivisie after having played for Jong FC Utrecht in the second-tier Eerste Divisie. Nick Venema and Odysseus Velanas preceded him.

On 2 January 2019, it was announced that Sow had signed with RKC Waalwijk. He left the club as his contract expired in June 2021.

On 10 August 2021, he moved to England and joined EFL League One club Sheffield Wednesday. He made his debut in an EFL Trophy match against Newcastle United U21, where he opened the scoring in a 3–0 win.

On 27 August 2022, it was reported that Sow returned to the Netherlands, joining Eerste Divisie club De Graafschap for an undisclosed fee. However, the transfer fell through, and on 29 August 2022 Sow signed a two-year contract with Go Ahead Eagles in Eredivisie instead.

On 1 February 2024, Sow returned to NEC until the end of the season, with the club holding an option to extend. NEC decided not to exercise the extension option, letting the contract expire.

On 25 July 2024, Sow joined Saudi First Division League club Al-Najma. On 10 September 2025, Sow joined Abha.

== Personal life ==
Born in the Netherlands, Sow is of Dutch/Senegalese descent.

== Career statistics ==
As of match played 30 April 2025

Appearances and goals by club, season and competition
Club	Season	League			National cup (Note: Includes KNVB Cup, FA Cup, King's Cup)		League cup (Note: Includes EFL Cup)		Other		Total	
Club	Season	Division	Apps	Goals	Apps	Goals	Apps	Goals	Apps	Goals	Apps	Goals
Jong FC Utrecht	2016–17	Eerste Divisie	32	7	–		–		–		32	7
Jong FC Utrecht	2017–18	Eerste Divisie	34	8	–		–		–		34	8
Jong FC Utrecht	2018–19	Eerste Divisie	29	8	–		–		2	0	31	8
Jong FC Utrecht	Total		95	23	–		–		2	0	97	23
Utrecht	2017–18	Eredivisie	1	0	0	0	–		–		1	0
Utrecht	2018–19	Eredivisie	0	0	0	0	–		–		1	0
Utrecht	Total		1	0	0	0	–		–		1	0
RKC Waalwijk	2019–20	Eredivisie	20	4	0	0	–		–		20	4
RKC Waalwijk	2020–21	Eredivisie	28	3	0	0	–		–		28	3
RKC Waalwijk	Total		48	7	0	0	–		–		48	7
Sheffield Wednesday	2021–22	League One	13	2	2	0	0	0	4 (Note: Appearances in EFL Trophy)	2	19	4
Sheffield Wednesday	2022–23	League One	2	0	0	0	2	1	0	0	4	1
Sheffield Wednesday	Total		15	2	2	0	2	1	4	2	23	5
Go Ahead Eagles	2022–23	Eredivisie	24	1	3	1	–		–		27	2
Go Ahead Eagles	2023–24	Eredivisie	18	5	3	2	–		–		21	7
Go Ahead Eagles	Total		42	6	6	3	–		–		48	9
NEC	2023–24	Eredivisie	16	2	3	0	–		–		19	2
Al-Najma	2024–25	Saudi First Division League	29	11	1	0	–		–		30	11
Career total			244	51	12	3	2	1	6	2	262	57
