= Jaden Brown =

English footballer (born 1999)

Personal information
- Full name: Jaden Brown
- Date of birth: 24 January 1999 (age 27)
- Place of birth: Lewisham, England
- Height: 1.75 m (5 ft 9 in)
- Positions: Left back; left wing-back

Youth career
- 2015–2019: Tottenham Hotspur

Senior career*
Years	Team	Apps	(Gls)
2019–2021	Huddersfield Town	28	(0)
2019	→ Exeter City (loan)	0	(0)
2021–2023	Sheffield Wednesday	20	(0)
2023–2024	Lincoln City	10	(0)
2024	→ St Mirren (loan)	7	(0)
2024	St Mirren	7	(0)

International career^{‡}
2014–2015	England U16	3	(0)
2015–2016	England U17	8	(1)
2016	England U18	5	(1)
2017	England U19	1	(0)
- * Club domestic league appearances and goals as of 16:21, 28 September 2024 (UTC) ‡ National team caps and goals as of 11:18, 14 July 2021 (UTC)

Jaden Brown (born 24 January 1999) is an English professional footballer who plays as a left-back or left wing-back.

== Career ==
=== Early career ===
Brown signed to the Tottenham Hotspur youth academy in July 2015. At the beginning of the 2019 transfer window Brown was sold on a free transfer to Huddersfield Town. He went immediately out on loan to Exeter City for the rest of the season. On 24 August 2019 Brown made his home debut for Huddersfield against Reading, he received a yellow card in the match in the 2–0 loss. He would leave Huddersfield Town at the end of the 2020–21 season, when his contract was not renewed.

=== Sheffield Wednesday ===
On 14 July 2021, he joined recently relegated League One side Sheffield Wednesday. He would make his competitive debut on 1 August 2021, at home to Huddersfield Town, coming off the bench in the first half replacing Olamide Shodipo. Following promotion back to the EFL Championship it was confirmed that Brown would be released following the end of his contract.

=== Lincoln City ===
On 4 July 2023, he joined Lincoln City on a 2-year contract. Brown made his Lincoln City debut in the EFL Cup against Notts County.

==== St Mirren (loan) ====
On 26 January 2024, Brown joined St Mirren on loan for the remainder of the season.

=== St Mirren ===
On 25 June 2024, Brown returned to St Mirren on a permanent transfer signing a two-year deal.

On 11 July 2024, Brown admitted to driving a car in Glasgow's Springfield Quay while being banned from getting behind the wheel. Only two days later, on 13 July 2024, Brown got behind the wheel again and drove as a disqualified driver in Renfrew's Abbotsinch Road. On 12 November 2024, Brown's contract was terminated by mutual consent two weeks after appearing in court charged with driving offences and attempting to pervert the course of justice.

== International career ==
=== Youth ===
Born in England, Brown is of Jamaican descent. He was part of the England under-16 team that won the Montaigu Tournament in 2015. He has gone on to represent England at U17, U18 and U19 levels.

== Career statistics ==
As of 28 September 2024

Club	Season	League			National Cup		League Cup		Other		Total	
Club	Season	Division	Apps	Goals	Apps	Goals	Apps	Goals	Apps	Goals	Apps	Goals
Tottenham Hotspur U21	2018–19	—			—		—		4 (Note: Appearances in EFL Trophy)	1	4	1
Tottenham Hotspur U21	Total		0	0	0	0	0	0	4	1	4	1
Huddersfield Town	2018–19	Premier League	0	0	0	0	0	0	—		0	0
Huddersfield Town	2019–20	EFL Championship	15	0	1	0	1	0	—		17	0
Huddersfield Town	2020–21	EFL Championship	13	0	1	0	0	0	—		14	0
Huddersfield Town	Total		28	0	2	0	1	0	0	0	31	0
Exeter City (loan)	2018–19	EFL League Two	0	0	0	0	0	0	0	0	0	0
Sheffield Wednesday	2021–22	EFL League One	11	0	1	0	1	0	3	0	16	0
Sheffield Wednesday	2022–23	EFL League One	9	0	1	0	2	1	4 (Note: Three appearances in EFL Trophy, one appearance in League One play-offs)	0	16	1
Sheffield Wednesday	Total		20	0	2	0	3	1	7	0	32	1
Lincoln City	2023–24	EFL League One	10	0	0	0	2	0	3	0	15	0
St Mirren (loan)	2023–24	Scottish Premiership	7	0	1	0	0	0	—		8	0
St Mirren	2024–25	Scottish Premiership	7	0	0	0	1	0	3 (Note: Appearances in UEFA Conference League)	0	11	0
Career total			72	0	5	0	7	1	17	1	101	2

== Honours ==
Sheffield Wednesday

- EFL League One play-offs: 2023
