= 2022–23 FA Youth Cup =

Tournament details
- Teams: 622

Final positions
- Champions: West Ham United (4th Title)
- Runners-up: Arsenal (3rd Runner Up Finish)

Tournament statistics
- Top goal scorer: (England) Divin Mubama West Ham United (8 Goals)

The 2022–23 FA Youth Cup was the 71st edition of the FA Youth Cup.

The competition consisted of several rounds and was preceded by a qualifying competition, starting with two preliminary rounds which was followed by three qualifying rounds for non-League teams. The Football League teams entered the draw thereafter, with League One and League Two teams entered in the first round proper, and Premier League and Championship teams entered in the third round proper.

622 teams were accepted into the FA Youth Cup. Manchester United were the defending champions after defeating Nottingham Forest 3–1 in the 2022 final.

West Ham United won their fourth Youth Cup title, their first since 1999, defeating Arsenal 5–1 in the final at Emirates Stadium.

== Calendar ==
Round	Matches played from	Matches	Clubs	New entries
Extra preliminary round	15 August 2022	60	622 → 562	120
Preliminary round	29 August 2022	224	562 → 338	388
First round qualifying	12 September 2022	112	338 → 226	
Second round qualifying	26 September 2022	68	226 → 158	24
Third round qualifying	10 October 2022	34	158 → 124	
First round	10 November 2022	40	124 → 84	46
Second round	26 November 2022	20	84 → 64	
Third round	17 December 2022	32	64 → 32	44
Fourth round	21 January 2023	16	32 → 16	
Fifth round	11 February 2023	8	16 → 8	
Quarter-finals	4 March 2023	4	8 → 4	
Semi-finals	8 April 2023	2	4 → 2	
Final	29 April 2023	1	2 → 1	

== Qualifying rounds ==
=== Extra preliminary round ===
120 teams took part in the extra preliminary round. Eleven teams withdrew from the tournament in this phase, and as a result, eleven walkovers occurred. The draw for the round took place on 8 July 2022.

Tie	Home team (tier)	Score	Away team (tier)	Att.
Thursday 11 August 2022
25	Soham Town Rangers (9)	0–5	AFC Sudbury (8)	72
Monday 15 August 2022
57	Hartpury University (10)	0–1	Shortwood United (10)	110
17	Worcester City (9)	5–0	Malvern Town (9)	
24	Kettering Town (6)	5–1	Ampthill Town (10)	78
36	Hillingdon Borough (10)	2–3	Holmer Green (10)	
46	Guildford City (9)	1–5	Horsham YMCA (9)	
18	Stafford Rangers (7)	1–1 (3–1 p)	Lichfield City (7)	
19	Tividale (9)	2–2 (3–0 p)	Lye Town (9)	145
38	Sheppey United (9)	2–2 (1–4 p)	Margate (9)	127
39	Chatham Town (8)	2–1	Folkestone Invicta (7)	157
Tuesday 16 August 2022
7	AFC Blackpool (10)	4–2	Runcorn Town (7)	52
15	Rushall Olympic (7)	7–0	Bedworth United (10)	55
32	Holland (10)	0–3	London Lions (9)	50
43	Worthing (6)	9–0	Billingshurst (10)	98
45	Kingstonian (7)	6–0	Badshot Lea (9)	81
Wednesday 17 August 2022
4	Ashton United (7)	2–7	Glossop North End (8)	125
14	Alfreton Town (6)	1–2	Stamford (8)	158
8	Handsworth (9)	1–3	Farsley Celtic (6)	62
12	Harborough Town (8)	3–3 (1–4 p)	Mickleover (7)	79
42	Horsham (7)	4–0	Broadbridge Heath (9)	139
52	AFC Portchester (9)	4–0	Hamworthy United (8)	
58	Welton Rovers (9)	3–2	Cirencester Town (8)	
5	Chester (6)	4–0	Irlam (9)	239
9	Bradford (Park Avenue) (6)	1–6	Guiseley (7)	211
16	Chasetown (8)	1–1 (5–4 p)	Racing Club Warwick (9)	147
21	Hitchin Town (7)	7–2	Godmanchester Rovers (9)	84
23	Dunstable Town (9)	5–2	March Town United (9)	83
30	Ware (8)	6–1	Redbridge (9)	
37	Croydon (10)	3–2	Cray Valley Paper Mills (8)	

Tie	Home team (tier)	Score	Away team (tier)	Att.
Thursday 18 August 2022
2	Newcastle Benfield (9)	1–2	Stockton Town (8)	69
28	Whitton United (9)	0–7	King's Lynn Town (6)	47
3	Hebburn Town (8)	2–2 (5–3 p)	Scarborough Athletic (6)	
6	City of Liverpool (8)	1–2	Radcliffe (7)	290
Match played at Radcliffe F.C.
31	Potters Bar Town (7)	4–5	Aveley (7)	68
33	Tring Athletic (9)	2–1	Penn & Tylers Green (9)	61
53	Wimborne Town (8)	1–3	Dorchester Town (7)	
20	AFC Dunstable (8)	1–1 (0–3 p)	Baldock Town (9)	72
22	Wellingborough Town (9)	5–5 (3–1 p)	Wellingborough Whitworths (10)	85
26	Brantham Athletic (9)	2–1	Ely City (9)	92
27	Hadleigh United (9)	2–4	Gorleston United (8)	75
34	Berkhamsted (8)	2–3	Leverstock Green (10)	
35	Windsor (9)	1–1 (1–3 p)	Balham (9)	
44	Chessington & Hook United (10)	2–3	Hastings United (7)	101
54	Sholing (9)	2–2 (6–7 p)	Hamble Club (9)	
60	Truro City (7)	3–1	Bishops Lydeard (10)	51
Friday 19 August 2022
1	Seaham Red Star (9)	W/O	Carlisle City (9)	NA
11	Quorn (9)	W/O	Bourne Town (10)	NA
13	Coalville Town (7)	W/O	Lutterworth Town (9)	NA
40	Sporting Club Thamesmead (10)	W/O	K Sports (9)	NA
47	Wallingford & Crowmarsh (9)	W/O	Clanfield 85 (10)	NA
49	Cove (10)	W/O	Banbury United (6)	NA
50	United Services Portsmouth (9)	W/O	Cowes Sports (9)	NA
51	Shaftesbury (9)	W/O	Alton (9)	NA
55	Oldland Abbotonians (10)	W/O	Gloucester City (6)	NA
56	Longwell Green Sports (10)	W/O	Newent Town (10)	NA
59	AFC St Austell (10)	W/O	Bridgwater United (9)	NA
41	Shoreham (10)	0–3	Eastbourne Town (9)	
10	Staveley Miners Welfare (9)	3–0	Eccleshill United (9)	61
29	Hyde United (7)	4–0	Stalybridge Celtic (7)	134
Monday 22 August 2022
48	Hartley Wintney (7)	9–1	Kidlington FC (8)	58

=== Preliminary round ===
448 teams took part in the preliminary round, with 60 teams having progressed from the previous round along with 388 new teams joining in this round. 30 teams withdrew from the competition resulting in walkovers, while Woodford Town was removed from the tournament on appeal for using an ineligible player. The draw for the round took place on 8 July 2022.

Tie	Home team (tier)	Score	Away team (tier)	Att.
Wednesday 24 August 2022
142	Ebbsfleet United (6)	W/O	Kent Football United (10)	NA
Thursday 25 August 2022
10	AFC Fylde (6)	3–1	South Liverpool (10)	
Monday 29 August 2022
31	Pontefract Collieries (8)	14–1	Brigg Town (10)	
173	Corinthian Casuals (7)	4–0	Abbey Rangers (9)	
195	Christchurch (9)	6–0	Bournemouth (9)	74
53	Paget Rangers (9)	0–4	Halesowen Town (8)	85
168	Redhill (9)	3–0	Leatherhead (8)	49
Tuesday 30 August 2022
27	AFC Liverpool (9)	6–0	Cheadle Heath Nomads (10)	231
30	Gainsborough Trinity (7)	1–1 (3–4 p)	Retford (10)	123
34	Tadcaster Albion (8)	2–3	Brighouse Town (8)	76
192	Havant & Waterlooville (6)	3–1	Winchester City (8)	91
216	Mangotsfield United (9)	3–2	Welton Rovers (9)	
15	AFC Blackpool (10)	4–1	Chorley (6)	48
8	Morpeth Town (7)	5–0	Hebburn Town (8)	106
48	Stamford AFC (8)	1–5	Grantham Town (8)	157
54	Stourport Swifts (9)	0–0 (4–5 p)	Leamington (6)	82
105	Welwyn Garden City (8)	1–3	Stanway Rovers (9)	63
123	CB Hounslow United (10)	0–5	Edgware & Kingsbury (9)	43
139	Sutton Athletic (9)	6–0	Whitstable Town (9)	50
175	Peacehaven & Telscombe (9)	6–1	Saltdean United (9)	225
196	AFC Portchester (9)	2–1	Downton (10)	
205	Thornbury Town (9)	1–15	Chippenham Town (6)	54
217	Cinderford Town (8)	1–4	AEK Boco (10)	88
56	Stafford Rangers (7)	2–1	Rugby Town (9)	253
65	AFC Wulfrunians (9)	2–4	Rushall Olympic (7)	83
66	Sutton Coldfield Town (8)	3–0	Alvechurch (8)	83
80	St Ives Town (7)	0–3	Buckingham Athletic (10)	66
84	Crawley Green (9)	0–0 (5–4 p)	Baldock Town (9)	40
90	Thetford Town (9)	0–1	Long Melford (9)	74
91	Cambridge City (8)	2–0	Stowmarket Town (8)	57
104	Witham Town (8)	0–8	Aveley (7)	
117	Bowers & Pitsea (7)	3–2	Frenford (10)	96
121	Enfield Borough (10)	1–3	Billericay Town (7)	
133	Bedfont Sports (9)	2–1	Hendon (8)	41
159	Bognor Regis Town (7)	3–0	Godalming Town (10)	80
160	Eastbourne Borough (6)	1–0	East Grinstead Town (8)	111
166	Three Bridges (8)	7–0	Steyning Town Community (9)	72
170	AFC Varndeanians (9)	0–10	Alfold (9)	
176	Metropolitan Police (7)	5–2	Horsham YMCA (9)	
178	Worthing (6)	8–1	Carshalton Athletic (8)	
182	Ascot United (9)	2–1	Abingdon United (10)	
197	Salisbury (7)	1–8	Gosport Borough (7)	99
203	Poole Town (7)	4–0	Lymington Town (8)	96
220	Bridgwater United (9)	4–0	Barnstaple Town (9)	
221	Plymouth Parkway (7)	2–0	Truro City (7)	159
Wednesday 31 August 2022
3	Spennymoor Town (6)	2–1	Blyth Spartans (6)	221
9	Whitley Bay (9)	0–8	South Shields (7)	102
20	Marine (7)	0–3	Burscough (9)	185
21	Avro (9)	2–1 (5–4 p)	Ashton Town (10)	205
68	AFC Telford United (6)	7–0	Tividale (9)	
85	King's Lynn Town (6)	2–3	Needham Market (7)	
144	Ashford United (9)	0–2	Tonbridge Angels (6)	124
145	Erith & Belvedere (9)	3–1	Sittingbourne (8)	161
146	Lewisham Borough (Community) (10)	5–1	Phoenix Sports (9)	
150	Dulwich Hamlet (6)	2–1	Rusthall (9)	
162	Westside (10)	1–2	Westfield (8)	32
202	AFC Totton (8)	2–1	Folland Sports (6)	90
212	Swindon Supermarine (7)	2–2 (5–4 p)	Malmesbury Victoria (10)	125
5	Chester-Le-Street Town (10)	0–11	Chester-le-Street United (10)	106
17	Vauxhall Motors (9)	1–0	Buxton (6)	99
26	Wythenshawe Amateurs (10)	6–1	Southport (6)	173
41	Birstall United (10)	1–6	Mickleover (6)	
43	Coalville Town (7)	0–1	Dunkirk (10)	92
45	Gresley Rovers (8)	0–1	Clifton All Whites (10)	81
51	Romulus (9)	0–9	Wolverhampton Casuals (9)	55
74	Kempston Rovers (8)	2–2 (6–7 p)	Milton Keynes Irish (9)	71
98	Little Oakley (9)	1–2	Bishop's Stortford (7)	43
100	Braintree Town (6)	0–9	Romford (9)	
109	Enfield Town (7)	0–2	Cheshunt (6)	68
111	Hertford Town (8)	10–0	Sawbridgeworth Town (9)	
129	Burnham (9)	0–1	Hayes and Yeading (7)	
134	Brook House (10)	1–2	Hanwell Town (8)	
141	Larkfield & New Hythe (10)	4–0	Punjab United (9)	
143	Dover Athletic (6)	9–1	Hollands & Blair (9)	
157	Chipstead (8)	8–0	Pagham (9)	61
167	Tooting Bec (10)	8–1	Mile Oak (10)	40
169	Bexhill United (9)	2–2 (7–6 p)	Lancing (8)	67
174	Tooting & Mitcham United (8)	3–2	Eastbourne United (9)	
180	Ash United (10)	1–3	Kingstonian (7)	166
183	Bracknell Town (7)	4–3	Hungerford Town (6)	109
189	Hartley Wintney (7)	3–3 (4–5 p)	Fleet Town (9)	91
201	Dorchester Town (7)	1–5	Horndean (9)	
204	Frome Town (8)	0–1	Odd Down (10)	61
218	Cheltenham Saracens (10)	2–1	Lydney Town (9)	89
11	Atherton Laburnum Rovers (9)	1–3	Chester (6)	65
14	Runcorn Linnets (8)	3–5	Clitheroe (8)	138
18	Nantwich Town (7)	1–0	West Didsbury & Chorlton (9)	151
22	Bootle (8)	3–3 (2–4 p)	Radcliffe (7)	106
35	Grimsby Borough (8)	0–7	Frickley Athletic (9)	37
46	Matlock Town (7)	0–9	Kirby Muxloe (10)	
47	Quorn (9)	1–3	Lutterworth Athletic (10)	65
69	Barton Rovers (8)	1–0	Wellingborough Town (9)	78
83	Brackley Town (6)	0–2	Northampton ON Chenecks (10)	74
89	Leiston (7)	2–2 (6–5 p)	Norwich United (9)	47
93	Lowestoft Town (8)	5–0	Felixstowe & Walton United (8)	75
97	Walsham Le Willows (9)	5–5 (2–3 p)	Gorleston (8)	34
102	Colney Heath (9)	7–2	FC Clacton (9)	
108	Grays Athletic (8)	3–2	Ware (6)	
113	Hullbridge Sports (8)	1–3	St Albans City (6)	
119	Brentwood Town (8)	3–2	Hashtag United (8)	82
128	Hilltop (9)	2–3	Wembley (9)	
131	Uxbridge (8)	1–4	Northwood (10)	42
132	Ashford Town (Middlesex) (8)	0–11	Hampton & Richmond Borough (6)	33
153	Dartford (6)	2–1	Croydon (10)	178
155	Eastbourne Town (9)	2–2 (4–2 p)	Little Common (9)	75
158	Worthing United (10)	0–0 (4–3 p)	Newhaven (9)	
163	Sutton Common Rovers (8)	5–0	Loxwood (9)	56
165	Chichester City (8)	1–3	Walton & Hersham (8)	98
186	Wallingford & Crowmarsh (9)	0–0 (6–7 p)	Fleet Spurs (10)	101
188	Didcot Town (8)	2–4	Thatcham Town (8)	73
198	Hamble Club (9)	1–1 (1–3 p)	Bemerton Heath Harlequins (9)	77
199	Portland United (9)	3–0	Brockenhurst (9)	68
200	United Services Portsmouth (9)	1–0	Fareham Town (9)	67

Tie	Home team (tier)	Score	Away team (tier)	Att.
Thursday 1 September 2022
24	Cheadle Town (10)	3–2	Glossop North End (9)	88
40	Lincoln United (8)	3–0	Anstey Nomads (9)	90
152	Welling Town (9)	1–3	Glebe (9)	88
209	Slimbridge (8)	8–0	Warminster Town (10)	114
1	Carlisle City (9)	1–0	Guisborough Town (7)	
6	Cleator Moor Celtic (10)	0–7	Stockton Town (8)	79
42	Leicester Nirvana (9)	0–1	Hinckley Leicester Road (6)	33
50	Long Eaton United (8)	4–1	Holbeach United (10)	125
125	Tring Athletic (9)	3–1	Balham (9)	29
135	Kings Langley (7)	10–1	Holmer Green (10)	55
136	Flackwell Heath (9)	1–3	Beaconsfield Town (7)	156
151	AFC Croydon Athletic (9)	1–5	Margate (7)	
154	Jersey Bulls (9)	2–1	Burgess Hill Town (8)	
156	Raynes Park Vale (9)	4–1	AFC Uckfield Town (9)	
177	Colliers Wood United (9)	3–4	Horsham (7)	
194	Andover Town (10)	1–1 (4–3 p)	Alton (9)	
208	Bristol Manor Farm (8)	1–1 (5–4 p)	Hallen (10)	79
213	Tuffley Rovers (9)	0–2	Paulton Rovers (8)	73
215	Clevedon Town (9)	3–0	Portishead Town (10)	133
224	Elmore (9)	0–4	Tiverton Town (7)	
12	Witton Albion (8)	5–2	Sandbach United (10)	123
13	Trafford (8)	0–2	Stalybridge Celtic (7)	187
19	Lancaster City (7)	2–0	Macclesfield (8)	64
29	Bottesford Town (9)	3–1	Dronfield Town (10)	85
33	Farsley Celtic (6)	0–5	Stocksbridge Park Steels (8)	
39	Deeping Rangers (9)	0–3	Basford United (7)	45
55	Coventry Sphinx (9)	4–2	Stourbridge (7)	105
59	Coton Green (10)	1–4	Hereford (6)	70
60	Stratford Town (7)	4–3	Boldmere St Michaels (8)	45
62	Evesham United (8)	0–5	Haughmond (10)	65
64	Pershore Town (10)	3–1	Walsall Wood (9)	30
72	Histon (9)	0–1	Letchworth Garden City Eagles (10)	108
73	Leighton Town (9)	0–0 (3–4 p)	Newport Pagnell Town (9)	219
75	Kettering Town (6)	3–0	AFC Rushden & Diamonds (7)	107
76	Stotfold (9)	3–2	St Neots Town (8)	86
77	Raunds Town (10)	3–4	Harpenden Town (9)	36
79	Daventry Town (8)	1–5	Royston Town (7)	30
81	Corby Town (8)	2–0	Huntingdon Town (10)	
86	Ipswich Wanderers (9)	0–7	AFC Sudbury (8)	
88	Wroxham (8)	7–0	Mildenhall Town (8)	65
92	Brantham Athletic (9)	1–1 (3–4 p)	Dereham Town (8)	
94	Swaffham Town (10)	0–4	Newmarket Town (9)	55
95	Fakenham Town (9)	7–2	Framlingham Town (10)	
96	Mulbarton Wanderers (9)	2–1	Great Yarmouth Town (10)	106
99	Cockfosters (9)	5–0	Barking (9)	136
101	Wingate & Finchley (7)	2–4	Hadley (8)	107
120	Takeley (9)	2–0	Waltham Abbey (8)	82
122	St Margaretsbury (10)	3–2	Buckhurst Hill (9)	
130	Leverstock Green (9)	1–6	Langley (10)	
138	Corinthian (8)	2–1	Chatham Town (8)	72
147	K Sports (9)	1–3	Welling United (6)	
179	Lewes (7)	3–0	Whitehawk (8)	115
190	AFC Aldermaston (10)	0–6	Wokingham & Emmbrook (9)	
191	Binfield (8)	2–1	Basingstoke Town (8)	78
207	Radstock Town (10)	0–3	Weston Super Mare (7)	
219	Ilfracombe Town (9)	3–6	Falmouth Town (9)	80
222	Elburton Villa (10)	4–1	Mousehole (9)	
67	Hereford Pegasus (9)	1–8	Tamworth (7)	106
Friday 2 September 2022
2	Billingham Town (10)	W/O	Darlington (6)	NA
23	FC United of Manchester (7)	W/O	Skelmersdale United (8)	NA
28	Ossett United (8)	W/O	Yorkshire Amateur (9)	NA
36	Guiseley (6)	W/O	Swallownest (10)	NA
38	Cleethorpes Town (8)	W/O	Sheffield (8)	NA
44	Sherwood Colliery (9)	W/O	Boston United (6)	NA
57	Leek Town (8)	1–3	Kidderminster Harriers (6)	137
61	Newcastle Town (8)	W/O	Bilston Town (10)	NA
71	Biggleswade Town (9)	W/O	Whittlesey Athletic (9)	NA
78	Dunstable Town (9)	W/O	Rothwell Corinthians (9)	NA
82	Cogenhoe United (9)	W/O	Hitchin Town (7)	NA
87	Bury Town (8)	W/O	Haverhill Rovers (9)	NA
106	Saffron Walden Town (9)	W/O	London Colney (9)	NA
110	Clapton (9)	W/O	Walthamstow (8)	NA
112	West Essex (9)	W/O	Great Wakering Rovers (8)	NA
115	Barkingside (10)	W/O	Concord Rangers (6)	NA
116	Hornchurch (7)	W/O	Tilbury (8)	NA
124	London Tigers (10)	W/O	North Greenford United (9)	NA
126	Harefield United (9)	W/O	Rising Ballers Kensington (10)	NA
127	Chalfont St Peter (9)	W/O	Slough Town (6)	NA
137	Chesham United (7)	W/O	Hemel Hempstead Town (6)	NA
140	Cray Wanderers (7)	W/O	Lordswood (9)	NA
148	Erith Town (9)	W/O	Ramsgate (8)	NA
149	Sevenoaks Town (8)	W/O	Faversham Town (8)	NA
161	Knaphill (9)	W/O	South Park (8)	NA
164	Montpelier Villa (10)	W/O	East Preston (10)	NA
172	Virginia Water (9)	W/O	Crawley Down Gatwick (9)	NA
206	Gloucester City (6)	3–1	Shortwood United (10)	
210	Bishop's Cleeve (8)	W/O	Shepton Mallet (9)	NA
211	Longwell Green Sports (10)	W/O	Cribbs (9)	NA
214	Bath City (6)	W/O	Street (9)	NA
7	Penrith (9)	4–2	Bishop Auckland (9)	77
37	North Ferriby (9)	5–0	Penistone Church (9)	138
58	Nuneaton Borough (7)	2–0	Redditch United (7)	
223	Helston Athletic (9)	2–3	Bovey Tracey (10)	149
25	Ramsbottom United (8)	0–5	Hyde United (7)	106
32	Emley AFC (9)	4–4 (4–2 p)	Staveley Miners Welfare (9)	221
49	Aylestone Park (10)	1–1 (3–4 p)	St Andrews (10)	
103	Heybridge Swifts (8)	3–2	Haringey Borough (7)	71
107	New Salamis (8)	2–4	Woodford Town (9)	208
114	Southend Manor (9)	1–0	Ilford (9)	57
184	Oxford City (6)	1–2	Aylesbury Vale Dynamos (9)	
185	Reading City (7)	9–0	Cove (10)	
193	Grays Athletic (8)	3–2	AFC Stoneham (9)	86
Saturday 3 September 2022
63	Shawbury United (10)	1–4	Worcester City (9)	
118	Chelmsford City (6)	1–2	London Lions (9)	
Sunday 4 September 2022
171	Hastings United (7)	5–0	Seaford Town (10)	72
70	Yaxley (8)	0–14	Bugbrooke St Michaels (9)	72
4	Pickering Town (9)	4–1	Workington (8)	51
52	Rugby Borough (10)	2–2 (4–5 p)	Chasetown (8)	
16	Lower Breck (9)	3–4	Curzon Ashton (6)	100
Thursday 8 September 2022
187	Thame United (9)	3–3 (2–4 p)	Ardley United (8)	
Thursday 15 September 2022
181	North Leigh (8)	0–2	Camberley Town (9)	75

=== First qualifying round ===
224 teams took part in the first qualifying round, with the all winners from the previous round participating. There were two walkovers in this round, and two teams were removed from the competition. South Park and Tilbury withdrew from the competition. Reading City was removed from the competition for fielding an ineligible player, and Lancaster City was removed for an unknown appeal. The draw for this round took place on 2 September 2022. There were 28 teams from the tenth tier of the football pyramid as the lowest remaining teams in the competition.

Tie	Home team (tier)	Score	Away team (tier)	Att.
Monday 12 September 2022
72	Glebe (9)	5–1	Lewisham Borough (Community) (10)	78
4	Morpeth Town (7)	6–4	Guiseley (7)	107
5	Chester-le-Street United (10)	3–5	Spennymoor Town (6)	
85	Peacehaven & Telscombe (9)	W/O	South Park (8)	NA
105	AEK Boco (10)	1–1 (4–3 p)	Weston Super Mare (7)	
112	Bridgwater United (9)	2–1	Tiverton Town (7)	115
13	Nantwich Town (7)	4–5	Wythenshawe Amateurs (10)	221
27	Worcester City (9)	0–1	Leamington (6)	
38	Royston Town (7)	7–0	Crawley Green (9)	128
42	Kettering Town (6)	7–0	Barton Rovers (8)	86
48	Dereham Town (8)	7–0	Bury Town (8)	106
60	Colney Heath (9)	3–0	Brentwood Town (8)	
62	Beaconsfield Town (7)	4–1	Wembley (9)	
65	Bedfont Sports (8)	2–3	Walton & Hersham (8)	67
69	Hayes and Yeading (7)	1–3	Edgware & Kingsbury (9)	75
77	Tonbridge Angels (6)	2–2 (4–2 p)	Corinthian (8)	
82	Redhill (9)	1–7	Metropolitan Police (7)	63
90	East Preston (10)	0–4	Three Bridges (8)	
95	Thatcham Town (8)	6–0	Fleet Spurs (10)	
108	Bath City (7)	0–3	Bristol Manor Farm (8)	
Tuesday 13 September 2022
103	Mangotsfield United (9)	7–1	Gloucester City (6)	61
10	AFC Blackpool (10)	3–0	Cheadle Town (10)	54
104	Slimbridge (8)	4–2	Clevedon Town (9)	88
26	Chasetown (8)	2–2 (7–6 p)	Nuneaton Borough (7)	
43	Newmarket Town (9)	3–0	Needham Market (7)	
47	Cambridge City (8)	3–0	Saffron Walden Town (9)	
87	Alfold (9)	2–1	Tooting Bec (10)	45
99	Bemerton Heath Harlequins (9)	0–7	Havant & Waterlooville (6)	40
Wednesday 14 September 2022
9	Avro (9)	3–2	Clitheroe (8)	82
17	Pontefract Collieries (8)	8–2	Brighouse Town (8)	120
84	Worthing United (10)	1–1 (3–4 p)	Bexhill United (7)	
8	AFC Fylde (6)	3–1	Burscough (9)	82
16	Ossett United (8)	1–2	Stocksbridge Park Steels (8)	108
18	Frickley Athletic (9)	0–0 (1–3 p)	Cleethorpes Town (8)	54
20	Boston United (6)	2–2 (4–2 p)	Grantham Town (8)	285
24	Clifton All Whites (10)	4–2	Dunkirk (10)	
28	Wolverhampton Casuals (9)	2–1	Newcastle Town (8)	60
50	Hertford Town (8)	5–0	Takeley (9)	
56	Stanway Rovers (9)	3–5	London Lions (9)	
59	Cleethorpes Town (6)	3–4	Heybridge Swifts (8)	174
89	Crawley Down Gatwick (9)	0–8	Eastbourne Borough (6)	76
98	Portland United (9)	1–1 (6–5 p)	Christchurch (9)	60
101	AFC Totton (8)	5–1	United Services Portsmouth (9)	76
109	Cheltenham Saracens (10)	1–4	Chippenham Town (6)	98
6	Chester (6)	2–2 (4–1 p)	Vauxhall Motors (9)	215
7	Radcliffe (7)	0–2	Stalybridge Celtic (7)	273
21	Hinckley Leicester Road (8)	1–6	Lutterworth Athletic (10)	35
23	Kirby Muxloe (10)	2–3	Lincoln United (8)	
30	Stafford Rangers (7)	2–1	Tamworth (7)	
32	Halesowen Town (8)	2–5	Sutton Coldfield Town (8)	82
35	Hitchin Town (8)	6–0	Milton Keynes Irish (9)	92
39	Newport Pagnell Town (9)	2–0	Letchworth Garden City Eagles (10)	152
61	Bishop's Stortford (7)	0–8	Concord Rangers (6)	230
64	Hemel Hempstead Town (6)	1–3	Northwood (8)	
66	Slough Town (6)	2–1	Harefield United (9)	84
68	Hanwell Town (7)	1–2	Hampton & Richmond Borough (6)	55
83	Corinthian Casuals (7)	2–1	Sutton Common Rovers (8)	64

Tie	Home team (tier)	Score	Away team (tier)	Att.
88	Kingstonian (7)	2–2 (5–3 p)	Worthing (6)	63
100	Poole Town (7)	0–2	Gosport Borough (7)	106
33	Hereford (6)	0–3	Rushall Olympic (7)	125
Thursday 15 September 2022
12	Witton Albion (8)	0–5	Hyde United (7)	153
31	AFC Telford United (6)	2–2 (3–1 p)	Kidderminster Harriers (6)	
74	Ebbsfleet United (6)	2–1	Larkfield & New Hythe Wanderers (10)	
75	Erith & Belvedere (9)	6–3	Whitstable Town (9)	140
93	Aylesbury Vale Dynamos (9)	0–0 (3–4 p)	Swindon Supermarine (7)	
15	Bottesford Town (9)	2–4	North Ferriby (9)	
25	Long Eaton United (8)	1–2	Basford United (7)	168
63	Tring Athletic (9)	2–2 (4–2 p)	Kings Langley (9)	74
70	Margate (7)	0–5	Dover Athletic (6)	95
81	Chipstead (8)	2–0	Westfield (8)	32
86	Raynes Park Vale (9)	2–3	Tooting & Mitcham United (8)	262
91	Ardley United (9)	5–1	Binfield (8)	136
97	Horndean (9)	5–1	Moneyfields (9)	
102	Andover Town (10)	4–2	AFC Portchester (9)	
106	Cribbs (9)	0–1	Bishop's Cleeve (8)	55
107	Paulton Rovers (8)	2–0	Odd Down (10)	
110	Bovey Tracey (10)	2–2 (4–3 p)	Plymouth Parkway (7)	67
111	Elburton Villa (10)	3–3 (2–3 p)	Falmouth Town (9)	
2	Carlisle City (9)	1–4	Stockton Town (8)	50
14	Lancaster City (9)	1–0	FC United Of Manchester (7)	113
29	Haughmond (10)	1–1 (1–3 p)	Coventry Sphinx (9)	
34	Stratford Town (7)	6–1	Pershore Town (10)	49
36	Biggleswade Town (8)	2–3	Corby Town (8)	
37	Northampton ON Chenecks (10)	6–0	Harpenden Town (9)	
40	Stotfold (9)	2–5	Bugbrooke St Michaels (9)	
41	Buckingham Athletic (10)	2–1	Dunstable Town (9)	69
44	Wroxham (8)	1–4	Lowestoft Town (8)	73
45	Fakenham Town (9)	1–8	AFC Sudbury (8)	
46	Long Melford (9)	4–7	Leiston (7)	
49	Mulbarton Wanderers (9)	1–1 (3–2 p)	Gorleston (8)	81
53	Walthamstow (8)	0–1	St Margaretsbury (10)	
55	Southend Manor (9)	0–3	Cheshunt (6)	54
80	Lewes (7)	6–0	Bognor Regis Town (7)	66
Friday 16 September 2022
1	Billingham Town (10)	1–4	South Shields (7)	118
73	Erith Town (9)	0–4	Dartford (6)	224
3	Pickering Town (9)	1–1 (9–8 p)	Penrith (9)	
58	Aveley (7)	7–0	West Essex (9)	
71	Cray Wanderers (7)	0–0 (5–4 p)	Dulwich Hamlet (6)	138
76	Sevenoaks Town (8)	0–10	Welling United (6)	70
79	Horsham (7)	0–0 (4–3 p)	Jersey Bulls (9)	
19	Emley AFC (9)	1–0	Retford (10)	152
22	Mickleover (7)	3–2	St Andrews (10)	82
51	Grays Athletic (8)	W/O	Tilbury (8)	NA
52	Billericay Town (7)	5–3	Cockfosters (9)	77
54	Bowers & Pitsea (7)	4–2	Hadley (8)	101
67	Langley (10)	4–1	North Greenford United (9)	
92	Reading City (9)	4–1	Wokingham & Emmbrook (9)	251
94	Fleet Town (9)	1–6	Bracknell Town (7)	95
Saturday 17 September 2022
11	AFC Liverpool (9)	8–4	Curzon Ashton (6)	181
Sunday 18 September 2022
78	Eastbourne Town (9)	0–4	Hastings United (7)	
Thursday 29 September 2022
57	Romford (9)	1–1	New Salamis (8)	42
96	Ascot United (9)	1–4	Camberley Town (9)	

=== Second qualifying round ===
136 teams took part in the second qualifying round, with all the winners from the previous round and 24 teams from the National League being added for this round.

Tie	Home team (tier)	Score	Away team (tier)	Att.
Monday 26 September 2022
21	Solihull Moors (5)	1–0	Stratford Town (7)	
31	Aveley (7)	1–1 (3–2 p)	Hertford Town (8)	76
53	Chipstead (8)	1–5	Woking (5)	70
63	Bridgwater United (9)	5–1	Paulton Rovers (8)	86
64	Bristol Manor Farm (8)	0–1	Mangotsfield United (9)	130
17	Basford United (7)	1–0	Notts County (5)	451
20	Sutton Coldfield Town (8)	4–1	Rushall Olympic (7)	55
22	Stafford Rangers (7)	3–1	Chasetown (8)	
28	Dereham Town (8)	4–0	Newmarket Town (9)	105
34	New Salamis (8)	3–2	Colney Heath (9)	45
43	Walton & Hersham (8)	2–1	Metropolitan Police (7)	
49	Kingstonian (7)	5–1	Horsham (7)	74
67	Falmouth Town (9)	1–3	Torquay United (5)	228
Tuesday 27 September 2022
3	Pickering Town (9)	0–6	Spennymoor Town (6)	
37	Bowers & Pitsea (7)	3–1	St Margaretsbury (10)	80
40	Barnet (5)	2–6	Beaconsfield Town (7)	60
54	Dorking Wanderers (5)	2–4	Three Bridges (8)	
Wednesday 28 September 2022
2	South Shields (7)	7–1	Gateshead (5)	384
12	FC Halifax Town (5)	4–0	North Ferriby (9)	107
56	Swindon Supermarine (7)	2–2 (3–0 p)	Thatcham Town (8)	213
62	AFC Totton (8)	0–3	Eastleigh (5)	
5	Avro (9)	2–6	AFC Fylde (6)	
18	Leamington (6)	1–4	AFC Telford United (6)	
39	Edgware & Kingsbury (9)	4–0	Hampton & Richmond Borough (6)	100
44	Dover Athletic (6)	1–4	Ebbsfleet United (6)	153
51	Tooting & Mitcham United (8)	1–1 (6–7 p)	Hastings United (7)	
58	Bracknell Town (7)	2–3	Camberley Town (9)	101
8	Chester (6)	2–0	Altrincham (5)	238
16	Lutterworth Athletic (10)	2–1	Mickleover (7)	
27	Heybridge Swifts (8)	4–1	Cambridge City (8)	146
36	Dagenham & Redbridge (5)	0–11	Concord Rangers (6)	
38	Northwood (8)	1–3	Langley (10)	82
42	Slough Town (6)	0–3	Maidenhead United (5)	
48	Dartford (6)	3–4	Maidstone United (5)	202

Tie	Home team (tier)	Score	Away team (tier)	Att.
Thursday 29 September 2022
11	Pontefract Collieries (8)	0–4	Scunthorpe United (5)	
33	London Lions (9)	1–0	Boreham Wood (5)	109
45	Glebe (9)	2–2 (6–7 p)	Cray Wanderers (7)	127
60	Gosport Borough (7)	1–1 (7–6 p)	Aldershot Town (5)	167
68	Bovey Tracey (10)	0–7	Yeovil Town (5)	123
13	Cleethorpes Town (8)	0–3	York City (5)	
15	Clifton All Whites (10)	1–5	Chesterfield (5)	
55	Bexhill United (7)	0–5	Corinthian Casuals (7)	119
59	Andover Town (10)	1–1 (6–5 p)	Havant & Waterlooville (6)	
65	AEK Boco (10)	1–4	Bishop's Cleeve (8)	
1	Stockton Town (8)	4–3	Morpeth Town (7)	171
14	Boston United (6)	2–2 (2–3 p)	Lincoln United (8)	405
19	Coventry Sphinx (9)	2–1	Wolverhampton Casuals (9)	
23	Kettering Town (6)	2–1	Newport Pagnell Town (9)	125
24	Bugbrooke St Michaels (9)	2–2 (3–4 p)	Hitchin Town (8) (5)	105
25	Northampton ON Chenecks (10)	1–0	Royston Town (7)	
26	Buckingham Athletic (10)	6–1	Corby Town (10)	101
30	Mulbarton Wanderers (9)	0–7	Lowestoft Town (8)	
41	Tring Athletic (9)	1–1 (5–4 p)	Wealdstone (5)	115
50	Lewes (7)	5–1	Peacehaven & Telscombe (9)	117
29	AFC Sudbury (8)	6–0	Leiston (7)	
Friday 30 September 2022
7	AFC Liverpool (9)	2–1	Wrexham (5)	191
46	Erith & Belvedere (9)	0–4	Welling United (6)	371
32	Grays Athletic (8)	1–3	Cheshunt (6)	
66	Chippenham Town (6)	3–1	Slimbridge (8)	61
4	Hyde United (7)	4–0	Stalybridge Celtic (7)	134
6	Oldham Athletic (5)	2–2 (3–4 p)	AFC Blackpool (10)	100
10	Emley AFC (9)	4–1	Stocksbridge Park Steels (8)	175
35	Billericay Town (7)	1–4	Southend United (5)	270
47	Bromley (5)	4–2	Tonbridge Angels (6)	
Sunday 2 October 2022
61	Horndean (9)	5–0	Portland United (9)	
Tuesday 4 October 2022
52	Alfold (9)	4–2	Eastbourne Borough (6)	40
Thursday 6 October 2022
9	Wythenshawe Amateurs (10)	3–0	FC United of Manchester (7)	292
57	Wokingham & Emmbrook (9)	0–0 (3–4 p)	Ardley United (9)	

=== Third qualifying round ===
68 teams took part in the third qualifying round, with all the winners from the previous round participating.

Tie	Home team (tier)	Score	Away team (tier)	Att.
Monday 10 October 2022
3	AFC Liverpool (9)	0–2	South Shields (7)	329
13	Lincoln United (8)	0–2	Basford United (7)	302
29	Eastleigh (5)	8–3	Yeovil Town (5)	172
9	Sutton Coldfield Town (8)	3–2	Buckingham Athletic (10)	
11	Kettering Town (6)	1–0	Stafford Rangers (7)	
20	Three Bridges (8)	4–1	Tring Athletic (9)	110
Tuesday 11 October 2022
8	AFC Telford United (6)	0–6	Scunthorpe United (5)	116
15	Bowers and Pitsea (7)	1–2	Southend United (5)	359
30	Horndean (9)	4–0	Chippenham Town (6)	
17	Aveley (7)	3–2	Cheshunt (6)	224
25	Alfold (9)	2–4	Beaconsfield Town (7)	85
34	Bridgwater United (9)	0–3	Mangotsfield United (9)	114
19	Walton & Hersham (8)	2–6	Dover Athletic (6)	
21	Maidstone United (5)	5–0	Edgware & Kingsbury (9)	293
23	Bromley (5)	3–1	Maidenhead United (5)	80
32	Swindon Supermarine (7)	1–2	Gosport Borough (7)	172
Wednesday 12 October 2022
12	Solihull Moors (5)	6–0	Lutterworth Athletic (10)	124
5	Spennymoor Town (6)	0–0 (5–3 p)	Emley AFC (9)	239

Tie	Home team (tier)	Score	Away team (tier)	Att.
18	Heybridge Swifts (8)	3–4	Concord Rangers (6)	158
Thursday 13 October 2022
26	Welling United (6)	0–1	Corinthian Casuals (7)	
2	Stockton Town (8)	1–2	Wythenshawe Amateurs (10)	218
7	Northampton ON Chenecks (10)	5–1	Coventry Sphinx (9)	264
10	Hitchin Town (8)	0–5	Chesterfield (5)	122
24	Camberley Town (9)	2–2 (2–4 p)	Woking (5)	252
27	London Lions (9)	1–4	Langley (10)	184
28	Hastings United (7)	2–4	Lewes (7)	102
16	AFC Sudbury (8)	1–2	Lowestoft Town (8)	100
Friday 14 October 2022
1	York City (5)	1–0	Hyde United (7)	233
33	Torquay United (5)	5–0	Bishop's Cleeve (8)	173
14	New Salamis (8)	3–3 (9–8 p)	Dereham Town (8)	65
22	Cray Wanderers (7)	1–6	Kingstonian (7)	145
Tuesday 18 October 2022
6	FC Halifax Town (5)	1–0	AFC Blackpool (10)	73
Thursday 20 October 2022
31	Andover Town (10)	2–3	Ardley United (9)	288
Wednesday 26 October 2022
4	Chester (6)	2–0	AFC Fylde (6)	327

== Competition proper ==
=== First round ===
46 League One and League Two teams entered the first round proper, with the 34 non-league winners from the qualifying rounds joining them for this round. Only Wycombe Wanderers and Crawley Town did not participate in the first round as they did not apply. Salford City and Barrow were originally drawn, but Barrow withdrew from the first round so Salford City won 3–0 on a walkover.

22 October 2022	Salford City (4)	Walkover	Barrow (4)	Salford
19:00 GMT				Stadium: Peninsula Stadium

26 October 2022	Morecambe (3)	1–2	Bradford City (4)	Morecambe
19:00 GMT	Sandle 49'		Tinsdale 56'; Jeffreys 90+2'	Stadium: Mazuma Stadium; Attendance: 190; Referee: Jordan Crossley

26 October 2022	Crewe Alexandra (4)	3–2 (a.e.t.)	Mansfield Town (4)	Crewe
19:00 GMT	Holíček 20', 107' (pen.); Webster 112'		Abdullah 7'; Whelan 98'	Stadium: Gresty Road; Attendance: 393; Referee: David Burton

26 October 2022	Lincoln City (3)	3–1	Doncaster Rovers (4)	Lincoln
19:00 GMT	Tucker 45'; Kabeya 77'; Donnery 90+3'		Goodman 8'	Stadium: Sincil Bank; Referee: Lee Hartley

26 October 2022	Ipswich Town (3)	9–0	Aveley (7)	Ipswich
19:00 GMT	Oudnie-Morgan 11', 40'; Buabo 19'; Valentine; Corrigan 76'; Taylor 86'; Barbrook 90'	Report		Stadium: Portman Road; Attendance: 395; Referee: Paul Quick

26 October 2022	Charlton Athletic (3)	9–0	Kingstonian (7)	Dartford
19:00 GMT	Bower 20' (pen.), 44'; Hobden 28'; Casey 30', 45+1', 45+3'; Huke 42'; Kanu 64'; Enslin 71'	Report		Stadium: Princes Park; Attendance: 165; Referee: Jake Hillier

26 October 2022	Exeter City (3)	4–3	Newport County (4)	Exeter
19:00 GMT	Spencer 16', 28', 32'; James 18'		Williams 59'; Stokes 64'; Young 90+1'	Stadium: St James Park; Attendance: 361; Referee: Mark Senior

27 October 2022	Bristol Rovers (3)	5–0	Ardley United (9)	Bristol
19:00 GMT	Savage 16'; Langlais 18'; 44' (o.g.); McKayle 80'; Lawrence 90+5'			Stadium: Memorial Stadium; Attendance: 440; Referee: Ashley Allen

30 October 2022	Bolton Wanderers (3)	3–0	Wythenshawe Amateurs (10)	Bolton
13:00 GMT	Shakespear 20'; Graham; Frimpong 75'	Report		Stadium: University of Bolton Stadium; Attendance: 472; Referee: Graeme Kearney

31 October 2022	Basford United (7)	1–2	Derby County (3)	Basford, Nottinghamshire
19:45 GMT	Baines	Report	Aideyan 15'; Fapetu 37'	Stadium: Greenwich Avenue; Attendance: 457; Referee: Matthew Tyers

31 October 2022	Beaconsfield Town (7)	2–3	Maidstone United (5)	Beaconsfield
19:45 GMT	11'; Bilicki		Arnold 44'; Jeche; Terry 87'	Stadium: Holloways Park; Referee: Jonathan Bolland

1 November 2022	Carlisle United (4)	0–4	Fleetwood Town (3)	Carlisle
19:00 GMT		Report	Lane 10' (pen.); Hughes 17'; Marsh 47', 51'	Stadium: Brunton Park; Attendance: 453; Referee: Christopher Joyce

1 November 2022	Rochdale (4)	1–1 (4–2 p)	York City (5)	Rochdale
19:00 GMT	Ehimamiegho 19'		Hernandez 42'	Stadium: Spotland Stadium; Attendance: 356; Referee: Steven Lennon
	Penalties
	Dunlop (penalty scored); Cunningham (penalty scored); Greenwell (penalty scored); Jesus (penalty scored)		(penalty missed) Harrison; (penalty missed) Clayton; (penalty scored) Heaton; (penalty scored) Dawson

1 November 2022	Grimsby Town (4)	4–0	Walsall (4)	Cleethorpes
19:00 GMT	Boyd 24'; Milner 38', 71'; Hodgson 53' (pen.)			Stadium: Blundell Park; Attendance: 273; Referee: Mathew Wright

1 November 2022	Peterborough United (3)	2–3	Northampton Town (4)	Peterborough, England
19:00 GMT	Toynton 75'; McCann 83'		Wyatt 12', 59', 90'	Stadium: London Road Stadium; Attendance: 485; Referee: Neil Howlett

1 November 2022	Cambridge United (3)	4–2	Stevenage (4)	Cambridge
19:00 GMT	Yearn 46', 81'; Usman 51'; Lott 75'	Report	Watkiss 57'; Skyers 90'	Stadium: Abbey Stadium; Attendance: 345; Referee: Ivaylo Kyosev

1 November 2022	Gillingham (4)	4–1	Corinthian Casuals (7)	Gillingham
19:00 GMT	Gbode 18'; Garrett 42'; Gale 70'; Sithole 90'	Report	Nicolau 89' (pen.)	Stadium: Priestfield Stadium; Attendance: 476; Referee: Kane Dempster

1 November 2022	Mangotsfield United (9)	2–5	Swindon Town (4)	Mangotsfield
19:00 GMT	88'; 90'		Kanu 45+2', 90+6'; Brown 60'; Dworzak 85'; Hubbard 90+4'	Stadium: Paul Sellick Brickwork Stadium; Attendance: 146; Referee: Andrew Hobbs

1 November 2022	Sutton United (4)	1–2 (a.e.t.)	Leyton Orient (4)	Sutton
19:30 GMT	Nunes 80'		Pegrum 36' (pen.); Smith-Kouassi 115'	Stadium: VBS Stadium; Attendance: 177; Referee: Michael Butcher

1 November 2022	Harrogate Town (4)	1–2	Stockport County (4)	Harrogate
19:45 GMT	O'Boyle 4'	Report	Mee 33'; Partington 90+3'	Stadium: Wetherby Road; Attendance: 364; Referee: Matthew Langdon

1 November 2022	Sutton Coldfield Town (8)	0–6	Shrewsbury Town (3)	Sutton Coldfield
19:45 GMT		Report	Kirby-Moore 10'; Knight 12'; Morris 16', 54'; Antal 45+1'; Hernes 62'	Stadium: Central Ground, Coles Lane; Attendance: 169; Referee: Jason Porter

1 November 2022	New Salamis (8)	1–2	Colchester United (4)	Bowes Park
19:45 GMT	Nathan		Mupomba 70'; Oni 90+8'	Stadium: Coles Park; Attendance: 98; Referee: Ross Murphy

2 November 2022	Hartlepool United (4)	2–3	Accrington Stanley (3)	Hartlepool
19:00 GMT	Fletcher 30'; 90+2'		Harper 48', 85', 90'	Stadium: Victoria Park; Attendance: 245; Referee: Christopher Ellis

2 November 2022	Tranmere Rovers (4)	3–1 (a.e.t.)	FC Halifax Town (5)	Birkenhead
19:00 GMT	Taylor 36'; Byrne 93'; Glennon 102'		Chenembiri 64'	Stadium: Prenton Park; Attendance: 201; Referee: Daniel Tyas

2 November 2022	Port Vale (3)	3–1	Chesterfield (5)	Kidsgrove
19:00 GMT	Fisher 16'; McDermott 34'; Chale 40'		Mitchell 3'	Stadium: Hollinwood Road; Attendance: 130; Referee: Harry Tarrant

2 November 2022	Plymouth Argyle (3)	A–A	Cheltenham Town (3)	Plymouth
19:00 GMT				Stadium: Home Park; Attendance: 289; Referee: Mark King

2 November 2022	Chester (6)	2–1	South Shields (7)	Chester
19:30 GMT	Nelson 82'; Forde 90+2'	Report	Fletcher 40'	Stadium: Deva Stadium; Attendance: 284; Referee: Louis Smith

2 November 2022	Southend United (5)	2–1	Kettering Town (6)	Southend-on-Sea
19:30 GMT	Fiddes 38'; Amir 55'		Brazier 80'	Stadium: Roots Hall; Attendance: 181; Referee: Peter Conn

2 November 2022	Lowestoft Town (8)	1–1 (a.e.t.) (4–3 p)	Concord Rangers (6)	Lowestoft
19:45 GMT	Lane 45+2'		Polyblank 6'	Stadium: Crown Meadow; Attendance: 287; Referee: Chay Hathway

3 November 2022	Scunthorpe United (5)	3–2	Solihull Moors (5)	Scunthorpe
19:00 GMT	Abraham 68'; Sellars-Fleming 83'; Poulter 87'	Report	Wood 71' (pen.); Ryley 90'	Stadium: Glanford Park; Attendance: 237; Referee: David Jones

3 November 2022	AFC Wimbledon (4)	5–0	Lewes (7)	Wimbledon
19:00 GMT	Sasu 18'; Tepe 27'; Williams 48'; Amissah 61'; Sidwell 71'			Stadium: Plough Lane; Referee: Adam Steele

3 November 2022	Portsmouth (3)	6–1	Three Bridges (8)	Portsmouth
19:30 GMT	Folarin 1'; Howell 31', 66'; Mottoh 40', 86'; Payce 64'	Report	Kaye 90'	Stadium: Fratton Park; Attendance: 379; Referee: Callum Waller

3 November 2022	Woking (5)	1–2	Horndean (9)	Knaphill
19:30 GMT	Kent		Powell; Bello	Stadium: Redding Way; Attendance: 213; Referee: Tristan Greaves

3 November 2022	Northampton ON Chenecks (10)	0–2 (a.e.t.)	Milton Keynes Dons (3)	Northampton
19:45 GMT			Blennerhassett 96'; Daffern 113'	Stadium: The Old Northamptonians Sports Ground; Attendance: 322; Referee: Thomas Dickens

4 November 2022	Barnsley (3)	5–0	Spennymoor Town (6)	Barnsley
19:00 GMT	Chapman 1'; Dyer 11', 26'; McKay 15'; Anaman 18'			Stadium: Oakwell; Attendance: 321; Referee: Stephen Rushworth

5 November 2022	Sheffield Wednesday (3)	1–1 (5–4 p)	Burton Albion (3)	Sheffield
12:00 GMT	Cadamarteri 33'		Scott 14'	Stadium: Hillsborough Stadium; Attendance: 300; Referee: Michael Trevethan
	Penalties
	Shipton (penalty scored); Flannery (penalty scored); Cadamarteri (penalty scored); Moses (penalty scored); Fusire (penalty scored)		(penalty scored) Delap; (penalty scored) Ademiluyi; (penalty scored) Pace; (penalty missed) Hazell; (penalty scored) Oyahwema

5 November 2022	Oxford United (3)	3–1	Torquay United (5)	Marston, Oxford
15:00 GMT	Gerrard 25'; Burton 31'; Elliot-Wheeler 45'	Report	Collins 73'	Stadium: Court Place Farm; Attendance: 194; Referee: Nathanael Wormleighton

7 November 2022	Forest Green Rovers (3)	3–2 (a.e.t.)	Eastleigh (5)	Nailsworth
19:00 GMT	Marquez 47', 96'; Mason 69'		Singh 14', 45'	Stadium: The New Lawn; Attendance: 249; Referee: Cain Collins

8 November 2022	Dover Athletic (6)	3–2	Langley (9)	Dover
19:45 GMT	Hatcher 17'; Dodds 30'; Odeniran 50'		Celestine-Charles; Unknown 80' (o.g.)	Stadium: Crabble Athletic Ground; Attendance: 170; Referee: Steven Goldup

9 November 2022	Gosport Borough (7)	0–3	Bromley (5)	Gosport
19:00 GMT			TBC 42', 62', 73'	Stadium: Privett Park; Attendance: 196; Referee: Harvey Small

9 November 2022	Plymouth Argyle (3)	3–0	Cheltenham Town (3)	Plymouth
19:00 GMT	Jenkins-Davies 18', 35'; Hatch 62'	Report		Stadium: Home Park; Attendance: 437; Referee: Mark King
Note: Match was a rematch after the original match was abandoned 3 minutes in at a 0–0 Tie.

=== Second round ===
40 teams played this round with all the winners from the previous round participating.

8 November 2022	Port Vale (3)	1–0	Salford City (4)	Kidsgrove
19:00 GMT	Trapasso 20'			Stadium: Hollinwood Road; Attendance: 164; Referee: Jordan Brooks

10 November 2022	Barnsley (3)	2–1	Scunthorpe United (5)	Barnsley
19:00 GMT	Jalo 47', 56' (pen.)		Sellars-Fleming 16'	Stadium: Oakwell; Attendance: 436; Referee: Arran Williams

15 November 2022	Bristol Rovers (3)	3–4 (a.e.t.)	Leyton Orient (4)	Bristol
19:00 GMT	Langlais 4'; Shaw 72', 90+3'		Clements 11'; Smith-Kouassi 63', 120'; Pegrum 65'	Stadium: Memorial Stadium; Attendance: 258; Referee: George Enever

15 November 2022	Forest Green Rovers (3)	0–3	Exeter City (3)	Nailsworth
19:00 GMT			Spencer 44'; Borges 89'; Beardmore 90+4'	Stadium: The New Lawn; Referee: Haydn Lavender

16 November 2022	Shrewsbury Town (3)	1–2	Rochdale (4)	Shrewsbury
19:00 GMT	Muenda 67'	Report	Kyffin 37'; Kelly 78'	Stadium: New Meadow; Attendance: 267; Referee: Cain Collins

16 November 2022	Colchester United (4)	3–0	Maidstone United (5)	Colchester
19:00 GMT	Uwandu 52', 60'; Price 65'			Stadium: Colchester Community Stadium; Attendance: 254; Referee: Neil Howlett

16 November 2022	AFC Wimbledon (4)	4–2	Swindon Town (4)	Wimbledon
19:00 GMT	Lahan 16'; Lock 33'; Sasu 43'; Williams 89'		Taank 61'; Hamilton 74'	Stadium: Plough Lane; Referee: Teddy Osborn

17 November 2022	Charlton Athletic (3)	4–1	Northampton Town (4)	Dartford
19:00 GMT	Kanu 26'; Bower 54'; Casey 60'; Enslin 82'		Duggan 54'	Stadium: Princes Park; Attendance: 175; Referee: James Keane

21 November 2022	Sheffield Wednesday (3)	1–0	Derby County (3)	Sheffield
19:00 GMT	Fusire 82'			Stadium: Hillsborough Stadium; Attendance: 256; Referee: Mark Reeves

22 November 2022	Stockport County (4)	0–1	Fleetwood Town (3)	Edgeley
19:00 GMT		Report	W.Johnson 62'	Stadium: Edgeley Park; Attendance: 442; Referee: Emily Carney

22 November 2022	Southend United (5)	3–2	Milton Keynes Dons (3)	Southend-on-Sea
19:30 GMT	Fiddes 25'; Sandat 35'; Williams 44'		Anker 28', 46'	Stadium: Roots Hall; Attendance: 181; Referee: Daniel Smith

22 November 2022	Lowestoft Town (8)	0–3	Dover Athletic (6)	Lowestoft
19:45 GMT		Report	Dodds; Ali; Hatcher	Stadium: Crown Meadow; Attendance: 380; Referee: Paul Quick

23 November 2022	Lincoln City (3)	4–2 (a.e.t.)	Tranmere Rovers (4)	Lincoln
19:00 GMT	Donnery 39'; Wheatley 73'; Berko 99'; Kabeya 117'		Taylor 25'; Flight 88'	Stadium: Sincil Bank; Attendance: 278; Referee: Wayne Gray

23 November 2022	Bolton Wanderers (3)	0–2	Accrington Stanley (3)	Bolton
19:00 GMT		Report	Harper 32'; Devonport 90'	Stadium: University of Bolton Stadium; Attendance: 354; Referee: Adam Davies

23 November 2022	Chester (6)	1–1 (3–4 p)	Bradford City (4)	Chester
19:30 GMT	Croft 17'	Report	Robinson 27' (pen.)	Stadium: Deva Stadium; Attendance: 472; Referee: Matthew McQuillan
	Penalties
	Daly (penalty scored); Griffiths (penalty missed); Maris (penalty scored); Bavington (penalty missed); Forde (penalty scored); Nelson (penalty missed)		(penalty missed) Jeffers; (penalty scored) Robinson; (penalty scored) Myles; (penalty missed) Jeffreys; (penalty scored) Wadsworth; (penalty scored) Dalghous

24 November 2022	Oxford United (3)	3–1	Horndean (9)	Marston, Oxford
19:30 GMT	Burton 63'; Bradney 69'; Tiamuna 90+4'	Report	Kent 67'	Stadium: Court Place Farm; Attendance: 137; Referee: Thomas Green

26 November 2022	Bromley (5)	1–2	Ipswich Town (3)	Bromley
13:00 GMT	Hvid 40'		Boatswain 37'; Barbrook 83'	Stadium: Hayes Lane; Referee: Craig Barnett

28 November 2022	Gillingham (4)	1–0	Plymouth Argyle (3)	Gillingham
19:00 GMT	Gbode 77' (pen.)	Report		Stadium: Priestfield Stadium; Attendance: 249; Referee: Reece Pinchback

28 November 2022	Grimsby Town (4)	0–1	Crewe Alexandra (4)	Cleethorpes
19:00 GMT			Lunt 68'	Stadium: Blundell Park; Attendance: 244; Referee: David Jones

30 November 2022	Portsmouth (3)	4–5 (a.e.t.)	Cambridge United (3)	Portsmouth
19:00 GMT	Howell 9', 70'; Mottoh 32', 114'	Report	Njoku 22'; Yearn 58', 95'; McConnell 90', 92'	Stadium: Fratton Park; Attendance: 382; Referee: Jordan McRitchie

=== Third round ===
64 teams competed in the third round with the 44 Premier League and EFL Championship clubs appearing in this round along with the 20 winners from the previous round.

30 November 2022	Sheffield Wednesday (3)	1–1 (3–1 p)	Barnsley (3)	Sheffield
19:00 GMT	Shipston 17'		Jalo 47'	Stadium: Hillsborough Stadium; Attendance: 444; Referee: Waqar Ahmad
	Penalties
	Shipston (penalty missed); Flannery (penalty scored); Cadamarteri (penalty missed); Johnson (penalty scored); Fusire (penalty scored)		(penalty missed) Monteiro; (penalty missed) Bland; (penalty scored) Dyer; (penalty missed) Hickingbottom

30 November 2022	Port Vale (3)	3–0	Hull City (2)	Burslem
19:00 GMT	Shorrock 40'; Trapasso 79'; Walters 87'	Report		Stadium: Vale Park; Attendance: 324; Referee: Mark Bates

1 December 2022	Huddersfield Town (2)	2–3 (a.e.t.)	Ipswich Town (3)	Huddersfield
12:00 GMT	Bakre 3'; Iorpenda 39'	Report	Valentine 58'; Barbrook 74'; Foyo 109'	Stadium: John Smith's Stadium; Referee: Joe Moss

3 December 2022	Coventry City (2)	2–3 (a.e.t.)	Southampton	Leamington Spa
15:00 GMT	Dausch 81'; Betjemann 114'	Report	Ballard 85', 104', 120'	Stadium: Your Co-Op Community Stadium; Attendance: 240; Referee: Gareth Davis

6 December 2022	Charlton Athletic (3)	2–3	Newcastle United	Charlton
19:00 GMT	Kanu 44'; Bower 51'	Report	Parkinson 14', 57'; Emerson 71'	Stadium: The Valley; Attendance: 407; Referee: Morgan Conn

7 December 2022	AFC Wimbledon (4)	1–0	Leyton Orient (4)	Wimbledon
19:00 GMT	Lock 26'			Stadium: Plough Lane; Referee: Callum Peter

9 December 2022	Preston North End (2)	6–1	Rotherham United (2)	Preston
14:00 GMT	Rodriguez-Gentile 31', 34', 44', 57', 61'; Nelson 66'	Report	Day 16'	Stadium: Deepdale; Attendance: 204; Referee: Elliot Bell

9 December 2022	Everton	3–0	Reading (2)	Liverpool
19:00 GMT	Okoronkwo 22'; Djankpata 27'; Barker 66'			Stadium: Goodison Park; Attendance: 200; Referee: David Burton

9 December 2022	Southend United (5)	0–3	Middlesbrough (2)	Southend-on-Sea
19:00 GMT			Matthews 30'; Bridge 50'; Patterson-Powell 90'	Stadium: Roots Hall; Attendance: 230; Referee: Deryll David

9 December 2022	Aston Villa	5–0	Brentford	Aston, Birmingham
19:00 GMT	Wilson 5', 27', 66'; Moore 9'; Munroe 75'	Report		Stadium: Villa Park; Attendance: 517; Referee: Simon Kavanagh

11 December 2022	Crystal Palace	1–3	Manchester United	Selhurst
15:00 GMT	Bell 54'	Report	Oyedele 9'; Norkett 12'; Mather 77'	Stadium: Selhurst Park; Attendance: 477; Referee: Ivaylo Kyosev

14 December 2022	Manchester City	3–0	Blackburn Rovers (2)	Manchester
19:00 GMT	Dickson 41'; Heskey 79', 81'			Stadium: Academy Stadium; Attendance: 363; Referee: Jordan Crossley

14 December 2022	Brighton & Hove Albion	2–1	Dover Athletic (6)	Brighton
19:00 GMT	Smith 18', 37'		Marapara 64'	Stadium: American Express Elite Football Performance Centre; Attendance: 190; Referee: Thomas Baines

17 December 2022	Stoke City (2)	5–1	Blackpool (2)	Stoke-on-Trent
13:00 GMT	Oliver 19' (o.g.); Challinor 66'; Griffiths 77'; Lowe 79', 85'		Hassan 25'	Stadium: bet365 Stadium; Attendance: 304; Referee: Adam Davies

17 December 2022	Sunderland (2)	2–1	Swansea City (2)	Sunderland
14:00 GMT	Bainbridge 65'; Williams 76'		Carey 18'	Stadium: Stadium of Light; Attendance: Behind Closed Doors; Referee: Givi Todua
Note: Originally scheduled for 14 December 2022, but was postponed due to a frozen pitch.

19 December 2022	Gillingham (4)	2–0	Wigan Athletic (2)	Gillingham
18:30 GMT	Sithole 58', 77'	Report		Stadium: Priestfield Stadium; Attendance: 239; Referee: Deryll David
Note: Originally scheduled for 13 December 2022, but was postponed due to a frozen pitch.

19 December 2022	Arsenal	6–0	Millwall (2)	Borehamwood
14:00 GMT	Gower 13'; Nwaneri 26'; Rosiak 29'; Cozier-Duberry 52'; Benjamin 75', 90'			Stadium: Meadow Park; Attendance: 749; Referee: Shaun Barry
Note: Originally scheduled for 14 December 2022, but was postponed due to a frozen pitch. Moved to 17 December 2022, then rearranged again to 19 December 2022.

19 December 2022	Birmingham City (2)	0–6	Luton Town (2)	Birmingham
19:00 GMT			Lynch 14', 85'; Nelson 42', 76', 78' (pen.); Johnson 72'	Stadium: St Andrew's; Attendance: 150; Referee: Ben Cooke

19 December 2022	Lincoln City (3)	0–3	Watford (2)	Lincoln
19:00 GMT			Blake 53' (pen.), 77' (pen.); Mullins 85'	Stadium: Sincil Bank; Attendance: 230; Referee: Ian Ruddock
Note: Originally scheduled for 16 December 2022, but was postponed due to a frozen pitch. Match was moved to 19 December.

19 December 2022	Burnley (2)	2–2 (a.e.t.) (7–6 p)	Norwich City (2)	Leyland
19:00 GMT	Westley 34'; Wane 115'		Renecke 58'; Welch 103'	Stadium: County Ground; Attendance: 191; Referee: Andrew Daniels
	Penalties
	Westley (penalty scored); Bauress (penalty scored); Pickup (penalty scored); James (penalty missed); Vaughn (penalty missed); Casper (penalty scored); Rogers (penalty scored); Wane (penalty scored); Grant (penalty scored)		(penalty missed) Welch; (penalty scored) Aboh; (penalty scored) Reindorf; (penalty missed) Matos; (penalty scored) Renecke; (penalty scored) Doy; (penalty scored) Djedje; (penalty scored) Thompson; (penalty missed) Chilvers
Note: Originally scheduled for 13 December 2022, but was postponed due to a frozen pitch.

20 December 2022	Leeds United	3–2	Accrington Stanley (3)	Thorp Arch
19:00 GMT	McFadden 45'; Wilson 55'; Andreucci 90'		Massey 11'; Harper 22'	Stadium: Thorp Arch; Attendance: 180; Referee: Joe Cunningham
Note: Originally scheduled for 14 December 2022, but was postponed due to a frozen pitch.

20 December 2022	Tottenham Hotspur	1–3 (a.e.t.)	Queens Park Rangers (2)	Stevenage
19:00 GMT	Kyerematen 59'	Report	Lawrence 88', 118'; Petrie 107'	Stadium: Broadhall Way; Attendance: 505; Referee: Michael Butcher
Note: Originally scheduled for 13 December 2022, but was postponed due to a frozen pitch.

20 December 2022	Crewe Alexandra (4)	3–4	Cardiff City (2)	Crewe
19:00 GMT	Holíček 11', 88'; Martins 74'		Fleming 10'; Mpadi 58', 86'; Ware 67'	Stadium: Gresty Road; Attendance: 410; Referee: Abid Hussain
Note: Originally scheduled for 13 December 2022, but was postponed due to a frozen pitch.

20 December 2022	Colchester United (4)	0–6	Cambridge United (3)	Colchester
19:00 GMT			Hoddle 22'; McConnell 32', 45', 46', 86'; Njoku 45'	Stadium: Colchester Community Stadium; Attendance: 270; Referee: Peter Wilson
Note: Originally scheduled for 13 December 2022, but was postponed due to a frozen pitch.

20 December 2022	Nottingham Forest	1–0	West Bromwich Albion (2)	West Bridgford
19:00 GMT	Osong 55'			Stadium: City Ground; Attendance: 246; Referee: Daniel Smith
Note: Originally scheduled for 16 December 2022, but was postponed due to a frozen pitch. Match was moved to 20 December 2022.

20 December 2022	Exeter City (3)	1–3	Oxford United (3)	Exeter
19:00 GMT	Beardmore 72'	Report	Elliot-Wheeler 35'; Johnson 48'; O'Donkor 90'	Stadium: St James Park; Attendance: 283; Referee: Phillip Eddie
Note: Originally scheduled for 13 December 2022, but was postponed due to a frozen pitch.

20 December 2022	Rochdale (4)	3–4	Fulham	Rochdale
12:00 GMT	Ehimamiegho 19', 76'; Jesus 76'		Loupalo-Bi 3', 87'; Osmand 44', 89'	Stadium: Spotland Stadium; Attendance: 341; Referee: Connor Everard
Note: Originally scheduled for 13 December 2022, but was postponed due to a frozen pitch. Then was rearranged to 20 December 2022

21 December 2022	Sheffield United (2)	1–3	West Ham United	Alfreton
13:00 GMT	Aston 84'		Marshall 56'; Mubama 65', 83'	Stadium: Impact Arena; Attendance: 158; Referee: Jack Hall
Note: Originally scheduled for 14 December 2022, but was postponed due to a frozen pitch. Match was rearranged to 21 December 2022 at 1pm.

21 December 2022	Bristol City (2)	0–1	Fleetwood Town (3)	Failand
19:00 GMT			Brown 90'	Stadium: Robins High Performance Centre; Attendance: 250; Referee: Haydn Lavender
Note: Originally scheduled for 13 December 2022, but was postponed due to a frozen pitch to 15 December 2022, then postponed again to 21 December 2022.

21 December 2022	Wolverhampton Wanderers	1–3 (a.e.t.)	Leicester City	Kidderminster
19:00 GMT	Ojinnaka 24'		Lindsay 25'; Richards 93'; Grist 99'	Stadium: Aggborough Stadium; Attendance: 377; Referee: Richard Walker
Note: Originally scheduled for 16 December 2022, but was postponed due to a frozen pitch. Match will be played on 21 December 2022.

22 December 2022	AFC Bournemouth	1–2	Liverpool	Bournemouth
14:00 GMT	Tonks 90+5'	Report	Danns 38'; Ahmed 78'	Stadium: Dean Court; Attendance: 1,084; Referee: Mark Senior

7 January 2023	Chelsea	3–1	Bradford City (4)	Kingston upon Thames
13:00 GMT	Castledine 19'; Mendel-Idowu 21'; Silcott-Duberry 69'	Report	Robinson 31'	Stadium: Kingsmeadow; Attendance: 619; Referee: Paul Barber

=== Fourth round ===
32 teams participated in the fourth round proper with all 32 winners from the previous round participating. The draw for the fourth round was made on 9 December 2022.

9 January 2023	Watford (2)	3–1	Everton	Watford
19:00 GMT	Grieves 11'; Blake 71'		Sherif 60'	Stadium: Vicarage Road; Referee: Richie Watkins

10 January 2023	Oxford United (3)	3–1	Cardiff City (2)	Oxford
19:45 GMT	Maxwell 49'; O'Donkor 51', 73'	Report	Spiers 3'	Stadium: Kassam Stadium; Attendance: 458; Referee: Neil Pratt

11 January 2023	Stoke City (2)	1–0	Manchester United	Stoke-on-Trent
19:00 GMT	Bickerton 58'			Stadium: bet365 Stadium; Attendance: 2,000 or 813; Referee: Ben Tomlinson

11 January 2023	Port Vale (3)	0–1	Liverpool	Stoke-on-Trent
19:00 GMT		Report	Laffey 19'	Stadium: Vale Park; Attendance: 1,802; Referee: David McNamara

13 January 2023	Sheffield Wednesday (3)	3–2	Leicester City	Sheffield
19:00 GMT	Flannery 41'; Cadamarteri 47'; Shipston 57' (pen.)		Briggs 17'; Evans 39'	Stadium: Hillsborough Stadium; Attendance: 342; Referee: Gareth Thomas
Note: Match was Originally scheduled for 10 January 2023 but was postponed due to a waterlogged pitch. Match will be played on 13 January 2023 instead.

17 January 2023	Aston Villa	1–4	Southampton	Birmingham
14:00 GMT	Kellyman 86'		Morgan 28', 69'; Dibling 51', 62'	Stadium: Villa Park; Attendance: 248; Referee: Daniel Lamport

17 January 2023	Newcastle United	2–3	Arsenal	Newcastle-upon-Tyne
19:00 GMT	Miley 18'; Parkinson 57'	Report	Ferdinand 15'; Cozier-Duberry 44'; Kamara 87'	Stadium: St. James' Park; Attendance: 983; Referee: James Bancroft
Note: Match was Originally to be played at the Northumberland FA Headquarters at Whitley Park. Match was moved to St. James' Park instead.

17 January 2023	Manchester City	4–1	Brighton & Hove Albion	Manchester
19:00 GMT	Dickson 14'; Ndala 45+2'; O'Reilly 75'; Muir 79'		Barrington 44'	Stadium: Academy Stadium; Referee: Jonathan Maskrey

17 January 2023	Ipswich Town (3)	1–1 (4–2 p)	Nottingham Forest	Ipswich
19:00 GMT	Oudnie-Morgan 26'		Esapa Osong 68'	Stadium: Portman Road; Attendance: 540; Referee: Reubyn Ricardo
	Penalties
	Corrigan (penalty scored); Foyo (penalty scored); Boswell (penalty scored); Taylor (penalty missed); Oudnie-Morgan (penalty scored)		(penalty missed) Esapa Osong; (penalty scored) Powell; (penalty scored) McAdam; (penalty missed) Whitehall

18 January 2023	Fleetwood Town (3)	3–0	Middlesbrough (2)	Fleetwood
19:00 GMT	Brown 27', 78'; Morrison 65'			Stadium: Highbury Stadium; Attendance: 353; Referee: Michael Crusham

18 January 2023	Luton Town (2)	3–1	Queens Park Rangers (2)	Luton
19:00 GMT	Burger 7'; Lynch 12'; Nelson 72'	Report	Lawrence 1'	Stadium: Kenilworth Road; Attendance: 1,005 (154 Away); Referee: Dale Wootton

18 January 2023	Gillingham (4)	1–2	Preston North End (2)	Gillingham
19:00 GMT	Sithole 2'	Report	Rodriguez-Gentile 22'; Best 86'	Stadium: Priestfield Stadium; Attendance: 365; Referee: Aaron Farmer

24 January 2023	Burnley (2)	0–1	West Ham United	Leyland
19:00 GMT			Earthy 89'	Stadium: County Ground; Attendance: 155; Referee: Stuart Morland
Note: Match originally played at Clitheroe FC's Shawbridge was postponed due to a frozen pitch. Match was moved to 24 January 2023 instead at Padiham FC. Match was then moved to Leyland County Ground because Padiham Pitch was still frozen.

25 January 2023	Sunderland (2)	0–2	Fulham	Hetton-le-Hole
19:00 GMT			Works 1'; Osmand 67'	Stadium: Eppleton Colliery Welfare Ground; Attendance: 341; Referee: Paul Cooper
Note: Match was Originally scheduled for 19 January 2023 but was postponed due to a highly anticipated frozen pitch. Match will be played on 25 January 2023 instead.

26 January 2023	Cambridge United (3)	1–0	Chelsea	Cambridge
19:00 GMT	Lott 32'	Report		Stadium: Abbey Stadium; Attendance: 1,051; Referee: Abigail Byrne
Note: Match was originally scheduled for 19 January 2023, but was postponed because of damage to the Main Stand's roof. The match was postponed a second time and moved the match one more day ahead as there was an unexpected freezing temperatures.

1 February 2023	AFC Wimbledon (4)	1–3 (a.e.t.)	Leeds United	Wimbledon
19:00 GMT	Williams 22'	Report	Ferguson 28'; Andreucci 91'; Thomas 92'	Stadium: Plough Lane; Attendance: 1,074; Referee: Jack Bloxham
Note: Match was postponed due to a few areas of the pitch being deemed frozen. Match was moved to 1 February 2023.

=== Fifth round ===
16 teams participated in the fifth round proper with the 16 winners from the previous round participating. The fifth round draw was made on 13 January 2023.

3 February 2023	Stoke City (2)	1–4	West Ham United	Stoke-On-Trent
19:00 GMT	Lowe 63'		Orford 22'; Mubama 37', 49'; Earthy 55'	Stadium: Bet365 Stadium; Attendance: 767; Referee: Harry Jones

3 February 2023	Ipswich Town (3)	2–0	Liverpool	Ipswich
19:00 GMT	Oudnie-Morgan 8', 45+1'	Report		Stadium: Portman Road; Attendance: 2,649; Referee: Aaron Farmer

6 February 2023	Luton Town (2)	2–3	Preston North End (2)	Luton
19:00 GMT	Lynch 17'; Matthews-Lewis 45+2'	Report	Rodriguez-Gentile 26'; Cross-Adair 45'; Best 61'	Stadium: Kenilworth Road; Attendance: 928; Referee: Stephen Parkinson

6 February 2023	Watford (2)	2–4	Arsenal	Watford
19:00 GMT	Adu-Poku 2'; Adeyemo 13'	Report	Cozier-Duberry 56' (pen.), 68' (pen.); Kamara 63'; Rosiak 65'	Stadium: Vicarage Road; Attendance: 2,403; Referee: Robert Claussen

7 February 2023	Southampton	3–2	Fulham	Southampton
19:00 GMT	Ballard 6', 13'; Doyle 9'	Report	Works 81'; Olyott 86'	Stadium: St Mary's Stadium; Attendance: 1,109; Referee: Phillip Eddie

7 February 2023	Manchester City	5–0	Fleetwood Town (3)	Manchester
19:00 GMT	Oboavwoduo 6', 63', 78'; Whittingham 37'; Dickson 50'			Stadium: Academy Stadium; Referee: Richard Aspinall

8 February 2023	Cambridge United (3)	2–1	Sheffield Wednesday (3)	Cambridge
19:00 GMT	McConnell 9'; Njoku 87'	Report	Phuthi 19'	Stadium: Abbey Stadium; Attendance: 1,084; Referee: Niall Smith

15 February 2023	Oxford United (3)	3–0	Leeds United	Oxford
19:00 GMT	Tiamuna 20'; O'Donkor 40', 47'	Report		Stadium: Kassam Stadium; Attendance: 756; Referee: Matthew Scholes
Note: Match was postponed because of a frozen pitch. Match will be moved to next Wednesday.

=== Quarter-finals ===
Eight teams participated in the quarter-finals with all eight winners from the previous round participating. The draw for the quarter-finals was made on 3 February 2023.

22 February 2023	Ipswich Town (3)	2–4 (a.e.t.)	West Ham United	Ipswich
19:00 GMT	Barbrook 6'; Valentine 69'	Report	Kodua 38'; Marshall 71'; Battrum 115'; Mubama 120+8'	Stadium: Portman Road; Attendance: 3,721 (663 Away); Referee: Paul Johnson

23 February 2023	Arsenal	3–2	Cambridge United (3)	Holloway, London
19:00 GMT	Nwaneri 11'; Cozier-Duberry 71' (pen.); Rosiak 90+3'	Report	Robinson 25' (o.g.); Yearn 68'	Stadium: Emirates Stadium; Attendance: 7,454 (2,797 away); Referee: Gary Parsons
Note: Match was moved ahead one day because of the Ambulance Service Strike in London.

2 March 2023	Preston North End (2)	1–3	Southampton	Preston, Lancashire
19:00 GMT	Mawene 20' (pen.)	Report	Doyle 10', 68'; Ballard 80'	Stadium: Deepdale; Attendance: 1,906; Referee: Mr. Aaron Jackson

7 March 2023	Manchester City	3–0	Oxford United (3)	Manchester
19:00 GMT	Oboavwoduo 21'; Dickson 66', 71'			Stadium: Academy Stadium; Attendance: 1,063; Referee: Michael Barlow

=== Semi-finals ===
Four teams participated in the semi-finals with all four winners from the previous round participating. The draw was made on 24 February 2023.

4 April 2023	Arsenal	2–1 (a.e.t.)	Manchester City	Holloway, London
19:00 BST	Rosiak 7'; Lewis-Skelly 120+1'		Oboavwoduo 74'	Stadium: Emirates Stadium; Attendance: 7,250; Referee: Tom Reeves

6 April 2023	West Ham United	6–1	Southampton	Stratford, London
19:00 BST	Mubama 10', 54', 72'; Marshall 13'; Kodua 68'; Fawunmi 88'	Report	Ballard 64'	Stadium: London Stadium; Attendance: 7,000 or 6,904; Referee: Samuel Allison

=== Final ===
The winners of the semi-finals advanced to the final to determine the winner of the FA Youth Cup. The draw to determine the home team was made on 24 February 2023. The match was played on 25 April.

25 April 2023
19:00

Arsenal	1–5	West Ham United
Benjamin 7'	Report	Earthy 16'; Marshall 18'; Kodua 42'; Casey 78'; Briggs 90'

Emirates Stadium, Holloway, London
Attendance: 34,127 (7000 away fans)
Referee: David Webb
