= Tom Adey =

English footballer (1901–1986)

Personal information
- Full name: Thomas William Adey
- Date of birth: 22 February 1901
- Place of birth: Easington Lane, England
- Date of death: 31 January 1986 (aged 84)
- Place of death: Hull, England
- Height: 5 ft 9 in (1.75 m)
- Position: Half back

Senior career*
Years	Team	Apps	(Gls)
19??–1921	Hetton Celtic		
1921–1922	Bristol City	0	(0)
1922	Hetton Celtic		
1922–1923	Bedlington United		
1923–1925	Hull City	16	(0)
1925–1926	Swindon Town	25	(0)
1926–1927	Northampton Town	10	(0)
1927–1928	Durham City	32	(6)
1928–1929	Wombwell		
1929–1930	Newark Town		
1930–193?	Mansfield Town		
193?–1931	Newark Town		
1931–193?	Hetton United		
- Crook Town
Total		83	(6)
- * Club domestic league appearances and goals

Thomas William Adey (22 February 1901 – 31 January 1986) was an English footballer who played in the Football League for Hull City, Swindon Town, Northampton Town and Durham City in the 1920s. He also spent time on the books of Bristol City without playing for the first team, and played non-League football for Hetton Celtic, Bedlington United, Wombwell, Newark Town, Mansfield Town, Hetton United and Crook Town. He played mainly at centre half or left half, but in his later career was sometimes used at inside left.

== Life and career ==
Adey was born in Easington Lane, Hetton-le-Hole, County Durham, the eldest son of Thomas Adey, a railway engine fireman, and his wife, Mary. He played local football for Hetton Celtic and representative football for the Durham County side. Although a trial with Sunderland came to nothing, in late 1921 he turned out for Bristol City's reserve team and, despite the local paper's opinion that he and another trialist "may develop into useful players, but neither were sufficiently experienced for Southern League football", succeeded in earning himself a contract with the Second Division club. He never appeared for the first team, and was back with Hetton by the end of the season. He spent the following season with Bedlington United of the North-Eastern League. By February 1923, the Blyth News suggested that offers had been made for his services, and that there was "no doubt that Adey has few, if any, superiors in the position in the N.E.L." On Easter Monday, he was "outstanding" as Bedlington beat hot favourites Blyth Spartans 5–0 to win the Northumberland Senior Cup on their first appearance in the final. Having done his duty by his club on the field, he contributed off the field as well by signing for Second Division Hull City for an "excellent" transfer fee.

Adey began his Hull City career with the reserves in the Midland League. The Hull Daily Mail were pleased with his early performances, which reminded them in style of the club's former centre half, Charlie Deacey, only with more pace. He made his Football League debut in the opening match of the season, on 26 August 1923 at home to Leicester City, and reportedly performed well in difficult circumstances after the loss of the experienced left half Tommy Bleakley to injury. He was ever-present for the first three months of the season, but with Hull sitting 20th in the table, the manager made changes that included Bleakley's return in Adey's place. He did not play again for the first team that season, but his services were retained for 1924–25 and he was a member of the touring party that visited Sweden in post-season. He made no first-team appearances in the new season, found time in November to marry a local girl, Kathleen Middleton, and was transfer-listed at a fee of £50. An offer from Second Division Southampton of an unnamed forward in exchange for Adey was rejected, and in early August, he signed for Swindon Town of the Third Division South. Shortly afterwards, he received a telegram offering him terms from Darlington, a club from his home area newly promoted to the Second Division as Northern Section champions; according to the Hull Daily Mail, he "regard[ed] it as probably all for the best" that he had already found employment.

Adey played regularly for Swindon, occupying the left-half position, and helped the team finish sixth in the table and reach the second round of the 1925–26 FA Cup. His last appearance was in a 2–1 defeat at home to Northampton Town on 3 April 1926. Swindon offered him terms for another season, but he advertised for a move, and signed for Northampton Town to fill a vacancy at centre half. He only made 11 appearances in all competitions – more often at left half, a position in which he "proved a great attacking force and a more stubborn defender than he had done in the centre" – and was made available on a free transfer. He again advertised for a club, mentioning that he would accept work at Midland or North-Eastern League level, and then returned home to join Durham City for what proved to be their last season in the Football League. He was mainly used at left half, but played at inside left for a spell in mid-season during which he scored both goals in a 2–1 win against Barrow and a "delightful" goal in a heavy defeat at home to Rotherham United combined with a bad miss from close range and a general performance that showed the Sheffield Sports Special that he was "not a success at the inside forward position, otherwise a different score would have been recorded". He finished the season with six goals from 32 league matches, which him the team's second highest scorer after Tom Leedham with nine. He left at the end of the season after Durham finished 21st in the 22-team table and failed to be re-elected to the League.

He then spent several years in Midland League football, first as player-coach of a young Wombwell side; while primarily used at centre half, he again appeared as a forward, and scored "four brilliant goals" as Wombwell beat Rotherham United Reserves 7–0. He finished the 1928–29 season with Newark Town, and remained with them until the end of the next, after which he spent time with Mansfield Town before returning to Newark by February 1931. In September 1931, having found work in his native Hetton, Adey took up the post of player-coach of Wearside League club Hetton United, and he also played for Crook Town.

The 1939 Register finds Adey and Kathleen keeping a pub in Hull. He died in Hull in 1986 at the age of 84.

== Career statistics ==
Appearances and goals by club, season and competition
Club	Season	League			FA Cup		Total	
Club	Season	Division	Apps	Goals	Apps	Goals	Apps	Goals
Hull City	1922–23	Second Division	0	0	—		0	0
Hull City	1923–24	Second Division	16	0	0	0	16	0
Hull City	1924–25	Second Division	0	0	0	0	0	0
Hull City	Total		16	0	0	0	16	0
Swindon Town	1925–26	Third Division South	25	0	4	0	29	0
Northampton Town	1926–27	Third Division South	10	0	1	0	11	0
Durham City	1927–28	Third Division North	32	6	2	0	34	6
Career total			83	6	7	6	90	6
