= Hetton-le-Hole =

Town in Tyne and Wear, England

Coordinates: 54.821°N 1.449°W

- Town and civil parish
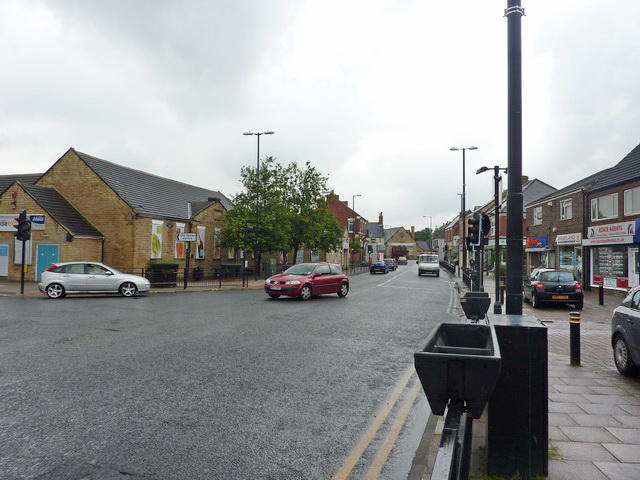
- Front Street, Hetton-le-Hole

- Location within Tyne and Wear
- Population: 14,402
- OS grid reference: NZ354474
- Civil parish: Hetton
- Metropolitan borough: Sunderland
- Metropolitan county: Tyne and Wear
- Region: North East
- Country: England
- Sovereign state: United Kingdom
- Post town: HOUGHTON LE SPRING
- Postcode district: DH5
- Dialling code: 0191
- Police: Northumbria
- Fire: Tyne and Wear
- Ambulance: North East
- UK Parliament: Houghton and Sunderland South
- Website: hettontowncouncil.gov.uk

Hetton-le-Hole is a town in the civil parish of Hetton, in Sunderland, England. Until 1974 it was in County Durham.

The A182 road runs through the town, between Houghton-le-Spring and Easington Lane which borders the County Durham District, off the A69t and east of the A1(M).

The parish includes the villages of Easington Lane and Warden Law, had a population of 14,402 in 2001. The parish also includes Hetton proper, along with East Rainton, Middle Rainton (West Rainton is a separate parish), Low Moorsley and High Moorsley.

Great Eppleton Wind Farm, a wind farm originally of four dual-bladed alternators, provides electricity to the National Grid. The original wind turbines have been replaced by larger three-bladed versions. The turbines are far enough away from local houses not to cause any audible disturbance.

== History ==
The history of the Hetton area can be traced back for up to a thousand years. The name Hetton derives from the Old English hēopedūn meaning 'wild rose hill'. In 1187 Bertram de Heppedune held the manor for the King; other de Hepdons were his descendants. The name was adopted by a local landowning family, the le Hepdons, who owned part of the Manor.

Records exist of the many holders of the manor back to the 14th century. William de Hepdon held half the Manor by deed in 1363 and in 1380 William de Dalden held the other half. Even earlier charters go back to 1187 and mention the early village of Heppedune, its people, houses, crofts, oxgangs and strips of land for the villagers in the three great fields around the settlement.

=== Hetton-on-the-Hill and Hetton-le-Hole ===
The ancient manor, which was bounded by that of Elemore, was divided into two parts known as Hetton-on-the-Hill and Hetton-in-the-Hole. The latter, a more sheltered vicinity, was where the present village arose.

=== Coal mining ===
By 1896, Hetton-le-Hole was a mining village in its own right; the district parish of Eppleton had been formed from Hetton-le-Hole which, by then, included that part of Hetton-le-Hole known as the "Downs". The village had a population of 5,000 and occupied 512 acres.

Coal has been mined in the surrounding area since Roman times. Coal was then obtained by drift mining, but by the 14th century shafts were used. In 1819 the Hetton Coal Company was formed and its first shaft was sunk a year later. It was a highly controversial undertaking, with geologists doubtful as to whether coal of any value existed there. The Hetton Coal Company's owners also decided to build a wagonway from their new Hetton colliery to the River Wear at Sunderland. George Stephenson was hired to build the 8 miles (13 km) line. The trains were powered by gravity down the inclines and by locomotives for its level and upward stretches. It was the first railway to use no animal power at all. These methods were used until 1959, as was some of the original machinery.

This was the scene of one of the earliest fatalities on railway lines, the "Hetton Wagonway Disaster" of Saturday 26 February 1831. Two Primitive Methodist Ministers were walking along the wagonway to Hetton when they saw some wagons approaching on the line on which they were walking. They moved to the adjacent line but had not seen wagons approaching from the other direction. John Hewson was killed outright, John Branfoot died a few hours later.

These activities led to a rapid increase in the size of Hetton and over 200 houses for the miners were built at once. These have all but gone now, but twelve of these former mining cottages from Francis Street in the Hetton Downs area of the town were re-erected stone by stone at Beamish Open Air Museum, Stanley, near Chester-le-Street. The UK miners' strike (1984–1985) brought about hardship for many of the workers. Two local unsigned bands (The Pigeon Fanciers and Haswell Crisis) recorded and released a single to raise money for the families and to recognise the contribution made by miners over the years in their locality. Their adapted version of a Bob Dylan classic failed to chart, but the project made a slight profit as local support from other mining communities ensured that 'Knocking on Hetton's Floor' sold more than 1000 copies.

Hetton Colliery closed in 1950, Elemore Colliery closed in 1974 and Eppleton Colliery closed in 1986. Today, nothing exists of the mines in Hetton; the former mine complexes have disappeared and spoil tips have been removed, although some remain in nearby Haswell. The area surrounding Hetton Colliery has been landscaped and is now occupied by a lake and leisure facilities. Eppleton Colliery has been landscaped, and all that remains is the Hetton Centre (the former Colliery Welfare building) and the Eppleton Colliery Welfare Ground which hosts the home games of Sunderland A.F.C. Women and Sunderland U23s. There is also a quarry where sand is mined. This is now undergoing a reformation; around 15% of it has been smoothed and grassed over.

A sad incident occurred on 27 June 1928 when 14 women from the village returning from a Mothers' Union outing to Scarborough were killed when the excursion train was involved in the Darlington rail crash. Because the damage was very localised, they made up over half of the 25 fatalities. "It was like a mining disaster with women rather than men as the victims; there were four widowers in a single street".

The decommissioned St Nicholas' Church in Front Street was destroyed by fire in November 2006. It is unknown if arson was the cause. It had previously been listed because of its architectural significance.

=== Civil parish ===
Hetton le Hole became a civil parish in 1866, on 1 April 1937, the parish of "Hetton le Hole" was abolished and merged with East Rainton, Great Eppleton, Little Eppleton, Moorsley and Pittington to form a parish called simply "Hetton". In 1931 the parish of "Hetton le Hole" had a population of 17,665.

== Governance ==
Hetton-le-Hole is represented by three councillors on Sunderland City Council as part of the Hetton ward.

Two of the three councillors represent the Labour Party, being Councillor James Blackburn and Councillor Iain Scott.

The other councillor is Councillor Ian McKinley, who is currently the only serving Reform UK councillor on Sunderland City Council.

=== Hetton Town Council ===
Hetton Town Council

Type
- Type: Parish council

Structure
- Seats: 21 councillors
- Political groups: Independent (16) Reform UK (3) Advance UK (2)

Hetton Town Council is the parish council for Hetton, composed of 21 councillors over 4 wards. Hetton-le-Hole, Easington Lane and Hetton Downs all have 6 councillors representing their wards, unlike the ward of East Rainton and Moorsley which has 3 councillors.

The wards of Hetton Town Council are as follows:

- Easington Lane
- East Rainton and Moorsley
- Hetton Downs
- Hetton-le-Hole

Current Hetton Town Councillors
Ward	Councillors
Easington Lane	Donna Brennan
Easington Lane	Richard Elvin
Easington Lane	Josh Green
Easington Lane	Mark Pigdon
Easington Lane	Kay Rowham
Easington Lane	Sam Woods-Brass
East Rainton and Moorsley	Lynsey Gibson
East Rainton and Moorsley	Pauline Hall
East Rainton and Moorsley	Stephen Holt
Hetton Downs	Phillip Dowell
Hetton Downs	Bill Little
Hetton Downs	Roz Meadows
Hetton Downs	Harry Morton
Hetton Downs	Donna Thomas
Hetton Downs	Christine Willis
Hetton-le-Hole	Kerry Angus
Hetton-le-Hole	James Bonsall
Hetton-le-Hole	John Defty
Hetton-le-Hole	David Geddis
Hetton-le-Hole	Joanne Lloyd
Hetton-le-Hole	Susan Waterston

As of July 2026, the composition of the council was:

Party	Councillors		
Independent	16		
Reform	3		
Advance UK	2	Total	21

== Notable people ==
- Terence Burns, Baron Burns, economist

=== Sport ===
- Thomas Adey, former footballer
- Allan Ball, former footballer, honorary director of Queen of the South
- Ralph Coates, former football player (Burnley and Tottenham Hotspur)
- Jordan Cook, footballer who plays for Hartlepool United
- Bobby Cram, former footballer (West Bromwich Albion and Colchester United)
- Harry Wilson, former footballer (Burnley and Brighton and Hove Albion)
- Tommy Harland, former cricketer
- Bob Paisley, former football player and manager (Liverpool)
- Harry Potts, former football player and manager (Burnley)
- Bryan "Pop" Robson, former footballer (Sunderland and Newcastle United)

=== Music ===
- Trevor Horn, record producer and recording artist
- Albert H. Oswald (1879–1929), composer of light music

== See also ==
- Hetton Academy
