= Deacy =

Deacy is a surname, an Irish variation of Dacey. Notable people with the surname include:

- Nick Deacy (born 1953), Welsh footballer
- Eamonn Deacy (1958–2012), Irish footballer
- Susan Deacy, British classical scholar

== See also ==
- Deacy Amp, type of guitar amplifier
- Charlie Deacey (1889–1952), English footballer
