= Albert Oswald =

Albert Oswald may refer to:

- Alfons Oswald (1914–?), Swiss sailor
- Albert H. Oswald (1879–1929), English composer and organist

== See also ==
- Albert Osswald (1919–1996), German politician
