= Cold Northcott =

Hamlet in Cornwall, England

Coordinates: 50.649548°N 4.538813°W

Cold Northcott: Cornish: Boswogledh Yeyn
- Hamlet
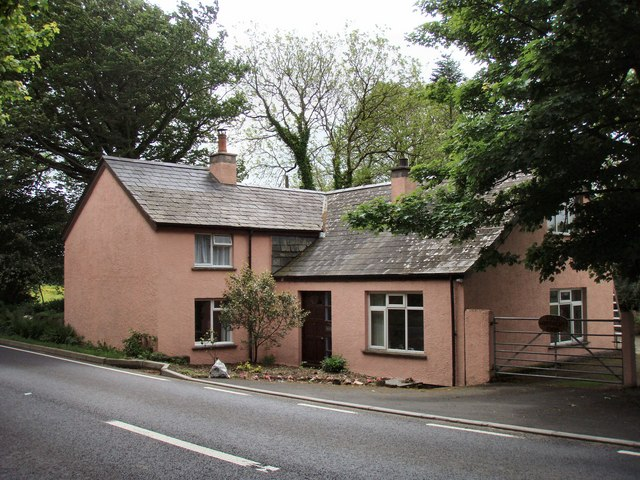
- Cold Northcott tea rooms

- Location within Cornwall
- Civil parish: St Clether
- Unitary authority: Cornwall
- Ceremonial county: Cornwall
- Region: South West
- Country: England
- Sovereign state: United Kingdom
- Police: Devon and Cornwall
- Fire: Cornwall
- Ambulance: South Western

Cold Northcott (Cornish: Boswogledh Yeyn, meaning cold dwelling of the north) is a hamlet in the civil parish of St Clether, in Cornwall, England, UK. It is on the A395 road two miles southeast of Hallworthy.

== Wind farm ==
Cold Northcott wind farm is a wind farm situated near the hamlet either side of the A395. It consists of 22 twin-bladed turbines (similar to Great Eppleton) with a nameplate electrical capacity of 6.6 megawatts and estimated annual output of 16 GWh. The turbines began operation in April 1993 (33 years ago) and are manufactured by Cumbrian Wind Farms. Cold Northcott wind farm is operated by a three-man crew of engineers who perform routine maintenance on the wind turbines. The turbines are manufactured by WEG. In early 2016 the 22, twin-bladed, wind turbines were out of use due to health and safety regulations. After being out of use for nearly six months, from June 2016, 20 turbines returned to use. Two turbines are still out of use due to one being struck by lightning. The other turbine, that is out of use, had a faulty gearbox. This then caused the blades to blow off during a storm, which resulted in the whole wind farm closing for nearly six months due to health and safety regulations. During the six months, the crew of engineers carried out maintenance on the operational turbines.
