= Gary Pearson (footballer) =

English footballer and manager (1976–2022)

Personal information
- Date of birth: 7 December 1976
- Place of birth: Easington Lane, England
- Date of death: 30 June 2022 (aged 45)
- Height: 5 ft 9 in (1.75 m)
- Positions: Defender; midfielder

Youth career
- ?–1995: Sheffield United

Senior career*
Years	Team	Apps	(Gls)
1995–1996	Sheffield United	0	(0)
1996	Stalybridge Celtic		
1996–1998	Gateshead	34	(3)
- Spennymoor United
?–1999	Seaham Red Star		
1999–2000	Whitby Town		
2000–2001	Durham City		
2001	Whitby Town		
2001–2004	Darlington	48	(3)
2004–2005	York City	12	(0)
2005–2006	Durham City		
2006	Bedlington Terriers		
2006	Gateshead	6	(0)
2006	Horden Colliery Welfare		
2006–2009	Sunderland Nissan		
2009–2011	Spennymoor Town		
2011	Crook Town		
Total		100	(6)

Managerial career
- 2011–2014: Crook Town
- 2014–2022: Ryhope Colliery Welfare
- 2022: Billingham Town
- * Club domestic league appearances and goals

Gary Pearson (7 December 1976 – 30 June 2022) was an English professional footballer and manager. He played as a defender and a midfielder for Sheffield United, Stalybridge Celtic, Gateshead, Spennymoor United, Seaham Red Star, Whitby Town, Durham City, Darlington, York City, Bedlington Terriers, Horden Colliery Welfare, Sunderland Nissan, Spennymoor Town and Crook Town.

== Playing career ==
Born in Easington Lane, Tyne & Wear, Pearson started his career with the Sheffield United youth system and signed a professional contract with the club on 3 July 1995. After three years with United he dropped into non-League football after signing for Stalybridge Celtic on 22 March 1996. He was with Football Conference side Gateshead for two seasons; in 1996–97 he made 34 appearances and scored two goals and in 1997–98 he made four appearances and scored one goal. He then had spells with Spennymoor United and Seaham Red Star before joining Whitby Town in 1999 after playing for them in a pre-season friendly. Pearson played for Durham City during the 2000–01 season before returning to Whitby in April 2001.

He joined Third Division Darlington on a one-year contract with the option of another year on 6 August 2001 after a trial. He made his debut in Darlington's 2–1 home victory over Macclesfield Town on 16 October 2001, but was substituted for Phil Brumwell in the 32nd minute. Pearson impressed as a substitute in Darlington's 2–0 defeat at Peterborough United in the FA Cup on 21 January 2002, leading to a run of six matches in the team before picking up an injury. During this period he scored his first goal for the club with a 25-yard free kick in a 3–2 home defeat to Luton Town on 26 January 2002. He finished his first season at Darlington with 11 appearances and one goal.

Pearson struggled to enter the team early in the 2002–03 season with injuries, eventually making his first appearance in a 2–0 win at Wrexham in the FA Cup on 16 November 2002. He established himself in the starting line-up in the final third of the season and on 12 April 2003 scored his first goal of the season in a 5–1 victory over Shrewsbury Town with a 35-yard shot that made its way through a crowded penalty area. He completed the season with one goal in 22 appearances. Pearson was a regular for Darlington in the early stages of the 2003–04 season and scored his first goal of the campaign in a 4–2 defeat at Rochdale on 30 August 2003. Because of injury troubles he was mostly a substitute for the rest of the season, which he finished with 19 appearances and one goal.

Pearson signed for newly relegated Conference National side York City on a one-year contract on 5 July 2004. He was sent off for violent conduct in the 69th minute of York's opening match of the 2004–05 season, a 2–0 away defeat to Aldershot Town on 14 August 2004. A shoulder injury kept him out of the team from early November 2004 onwards and was released by the club on 17 March 2005, although he was told he could return for pre-season. He had made 13 appearances for York.

He re-signed for former club Durham City in June 2005 before joining Northern League outfit Bedlington Terriers in January 2006, making his debut in a 5–1 defeat at West Auckland Town. Pearson was re-signed by Gateshead, by this time in the Northern Premier League Premier Division, on 31 March 2006. He made six appearances for Gateshead before the end of the 2005–06 season. He signed for Horden Colliery Welfare as a player-coach in July 2006 and later that year was playing for Sunderland Nissan and remained with them until 2009, when the club folded. He spent the following two seasons with Spennymoor Town.

== Coaching and managerial career ==
Pearson started the 2011–12 season as player-coach at Crook Town, before taking over as manager in December 2011. He resigned in May 2014 to take over at Ryhope Colliery Welfare. In 2022 he was appointed manager of Billingham Town.

== Style of play ==
Pearson played as a centre-back and a central defensive midfielder, being noted for his robust tackling and committed play.

== Personal life ==
Pearson played alongside his brother Alan during spells with Seaham Red Star FC and Durham City FC.

Pearson died at home on 30 June 2022 at the age of 45. He had received treatment for a heart attack several weeks before, and another attack was suspected.

== Career statistics ==
Appearances and goals by club, season and competition
Club	Season	League			FA Cup		League Cup		Other		Total	
Club	Season	Division	Apps	Goals	Apps	Goals	Apps	Goals	Apps	Goals	Apps	Goals
Gateshead	1996–97	Football Conference	30	2	3	0	—		1 (Note: Appearance in FA Trophy)	0	34	2
Gateshead	1997–98	Football Conference	4	1	0	0	—		0	0	4	1
Gateshead	Total		34	3	3	0	0	0	1	0	38	3
Darlington	2001–02	Third Division	9	1	1	0	0	0	1 (Note: Appearance in Football League Trophy)	0	11	1
Darlington	2002–03	Third Division	21	1	1	0	0	0	0	0	22	1
Darlington	2003–04	Third Division	18	1	1	0	0	0	0	0	19	1
Darlington	Total		48	3	3	0	0	0	1	0	52	3
York City	2004–05	Conference National	12	0	0	0	—		1	0	13	0
Gateshead	2005–06	NPL Premier Division	6	0	0	0	—		0	0	6	0
Career total			100	6	6	0	0	0	3	0	109	6
