= Jimi Gower =

English footballer (born 2004)

Personal information
- Full name: Jimi Mark Gower
- Date of birth: 1 October 2004 (age 22)
- Place of birth: Harold Wood, England
- Height: 1.81 m (5 ft 11 in)
- Position: Midfielder

Team information
- Current team: Moreirense
- Number: 30

Youth career
- –2017: Southend United
- 2017–2023: Arsenal

Senior career*
Years	Team	Apps	(Gls)
2023–2025	Arsenal	0	(0)
2025–	Moreirense	9	(0)
- * Club domestic league appearances and goals as of 25 May 2026

Jimi Mark Gower (born 1 October 2004) is an English professional footballer who plays as a midfielder for Primeira Liga club Moreirense.

== Early life ==
Gower was born on 1 October 2004 in London, England. He is the son of English footballer Mark Gower, and is of Malaysian descent through his mother.

== Career ==
Gower joined the youth academy of Southend United at the age of eight. Subsequently, he joined the youth academy of Premier League side Arsenal, helping the club's under-18 team reach the final of the 2022–23 FA Youth Cup. On 1 April 2025, he was first called up to the senior matchday squad for a 2–1 home win over Fulham in the league.. Gower departed Arsenal on June 30, 2025, after the expiration of his contract.

== Style of play ==
Gower plays as a midfielder. Russian news website Tribuna.com wrote in 2025 that he "can play as a number eight, number ten, or even deeper in midfield. He is known for his impressive range of passing and ability to read the game".

== Career statistics ==
As of match played 15 March 2026

Appearances and goals by club, season and competition
Club	Season	League			National cup (Note: Includes FA Cup and Taça de Portugal)		League cup (Note: Includes EFL Cup and Taça da Liga)		Continetnal		Other		Total	
Club	Season	Division	Apps	Goals	Apps	Goals	Apps	Goals	Apps	Goals	Apps	Goals	Apps	Goals
Arsenal U21	2023–24	—			—		—		—		4 (Note: Appearance(s) in EFL Trophy)	1	4	1
Arsenal U21	2024–25	—			—		—		—		3	0	3	0
Arsenal U21	Total		—		—		—		—		7	1	7	1
Arsenal	2024–25	Premier League	0	0	0	0	0	0	0	0	—		0	0
Moreirense	2025–26	Primeira Liga	6	0	1	0	0	0	—		—		7	0
Career total			6	0	1	0	0	0	0	0	7	1	14	1
