= List of Pickering Town F.C. seasons =

Pickering Town Football Club were first established in 1888 and for many years the club competed in local football leagues. Pickering eventually joining the Yorkshire Football League Division Three in 1972. When the Football League introduced the step system for non-league teams, the club were in the Northern Counties East Football League Division 1 at Step 6 of the non-league system (Level 10 overall).

== Key ==
Key to league record

- Lvl = Level of the league in the current league system
- S = Numbers of seasons
- Pld = Games played
- W = Games won
- D = Games drawn
- L = Games lost
- GF = Goals for
- GA = Goals against
- GD = Goals difference
- Pts = Points
- Position = Position in the final league table
- Overall position = Overall club position in the English league system

Key to cup records

- Res = Final reached round
- Rec = Final club record in the form of wins-draws-losses
- EP= Extra Preliminary round
- PR = Premilinary round
- QR1 = Qualifying round 1
- QR2 = Qualifying round 2
- QR3 = Qualifying round 3
- QR4 = Qualifying round 4
- R1 = Round 1
- R2 = Round 2
- R3 = Round 3
- R4 = Round 4
- R5 = Round 5
- R6 = Round 6
- QF = Quarter-finals
- SF = Semi-finals
- RU = Runners-up
- W = Winners

== Seasons ==
In the non-league system where there is promotion and relegation there is the necessity for those in charge of scheduling matches to move some teams between different regional leagues at the same level to ensure as even a geographical spread as possible.

=== Timeline notes ===
Of the available records, it shows the club joining the York League in the 1953–54 season. From those records, only the final positions have been recorded.
Despite joining the Yorkshire League in the 1972–73 season, records show the club continued to compete in the York League until the end of the 1976–77 season.
The 1984–85 season saw the introduction of 3 points for a win.
The club's FA Vase 1st round 2nd replay win was played at a neutral venue in Ryhope, Sunderland.
The club lost their 2007–08 FA Vase 3 round tie against Winterton Rangers, but progressed when their opponents were thrown out for fielding an ineligible player.
The club's 2009–10 FA Vase 3 round replay against Dunkirk was a 2–2 draw in regulation play. The club won the tie 5–4 on penalties.
The club's 2011–12 FA Cup preliminary round replay against Liversedge was drawn 3–3 in regulation play. The club won the tie 5–4 on penalties.
The club's 2016–17 FA Cup Extra Preliminary round replay Sunderland Ryhope Colliery Welfare was drawn 3–3 in regulation play. The club won the tie 3–1 on penalties.
The club's 2018–19 FA Cup Preliminary round tie against Clitheroe was a home tie, but was actually played at Selby Town F.C.
The club's 2018–19 FA Cup Preliminary round tie against Colne was a home tie, but was actually played at Scarborough Athletic F.C.
The 2019–20 and 2020–21 seasons were abandoned due to the effects of the COVID-19 pandemic.

Year	League	Position
1953–54	York League Division 2A	1st of 15; Promoted
1954–55	York League Division 1	7th of 15
1956–57	York League Division 1	1st of 15; Champions
1957–58	York League Division 1	7th of 15
1958–59	York League Division 1	8th of 15
1959–60	York League Division 1	2nd of 15
1960–61	York League Division 1	6th of 15
1961–62	York League Division 1	11th of 15
1962–63	York League Division 1	6th of 15
1963–64	York League Division 1	4th of 15
1964–65	York League Division 1	4th of 12
1965–66	York League Division 1	2nd of 12
1966–67	York League Division 1	1st of 13; Champions
1967–68	York League Division 1	4th of 12
1968–69	York League Division 1	7th of 12
1969–70	York League Division 1	1st of 12; Champions
1970–71	York League Division 1	Not recorded
1971–72	York League Division 1	11th of 12; Relegated
1972–73	York League Division 2	7th of 12
1973–74	York League Division 2	7th of 13
1974–75	York League Division 2	4th of 13; Moved to Div 1
1975–76	York League Division 1	12th of 13

Year	League	Lvl	Pld	W	D	L	GF	GA	GD	Pts	Position	Leading league scorer		FA Cup		FA Trophy		FA Vase	
Year	League	Lvl	Pld	W	D	L	GF	GA	GD	Pts	Position	Name	Goals	Res	Rec	Res	Rec	Res	Rec
1972–73	Yorkshire League Division 3	N/A	30	15	7	8	61	45	+16	37	5th of 16								
1973–74	Yorkshire League Division 3	N/A	30	22	4	4	96	34	+62	48	1st of 16; Champions; Promoted								
1974–75	Yorkshire League Division 2	N/A	28	14	9	5	55	32	+23	37	2nd of 15; Promoted								
1975–76	Yorkshire League Division 1	N/A	30	9	8	13	36	49	−13	26	12th of 16							2R	1–0–1
1976–77	Yorkshire League Division 1	N/A	30	4	1	25	23	85	-62	9	16th of 16; Relegated							PR	0–0–1
1977–78	Yorkshire League Division 2	N/A	28	8	3	17	38	73	-35	19	14th of 15; Relegated							PR	0–1–1
1978–79	Yorkshire Division 3	N/A	28	13	7	8	67	47	+20	33	6th of 15							PR	0–0–1
1979–80	Yorkshire Division 3	N/A	26	11	2	13	44	34	+10	24	10th of 14							PR	0–0–1
1980–81	Yorkshire Division 3	N/A	30	12	10	8	43	34	+9	34	9th of 16							2R	2–0–1
1981–82	Yorkshire Division 3	N/A	28	11	4	13	38	41	−3	26	9th of 15; League Amalgamation							1R	1–1–1
1982–83	North Counties East League Division 2 North	N/A	26	7	6	13	26	40	−14	20	13th of 14							PR	0–0–1
1983–84	North Counties East League Division 2 North	N/A	26	13	2	11	36	34	+2	28	6th of 14; League Re-organisation								
1984–85	North Counties East Division 1 North	N/A	32	11	8	13	37	43	−6	41	11th of 17; League Re-organisation								
1985–86	Northern Counties East Division 2	N/A	30	5	10	15	33	52	−19	24	15th of 16; Deducted 1 point								
1986–87	Northern Counties East Division 2	N/A	34	8	15	11	39	57	−18	39	14th of 18								
1987–88	Northern Counties East Division 2	N/A	28	18	6	4	66	33	+33	60	1st of 15; Champions; Promoted								
1988–89	Northern Counties East Division 1	N/A	30	16	4	10	58	54	+4	52	5th of 16							PR	1–0–1
1989–90	Northern Counties East Division 1	N/A	28	6	5	17	39	64	−25	23	14th of 15							PR	1–0–1
1990–91	Northern Counties East Division 1	N/A	24	15	2	7	54	41	+13	47	4th of 13							EP	0–1–1
1991–92	Northern Counties East Division 1	10	30	19	4	7	84	46	+38	61	2nd of 16; Promoted							PR	1―0―1
1992–93	Northern Counties East Premier Division	9	38	27	4	7	90	48	+42	85	2nd of 20							2R	2–3–1
1993–94	Northern Counties East Premier Division	9	38	17	10	11	76	61	+15	61	6th of 20			1Q	1–0–1			2R	2–0–1
1994–95	Northern Counties East Premier Division	9	38	18	8	12	68	60	+8	62	7th of 20			1Q	1–0–1			3R	3–1–1
1995–96	Northern Counties East Premier Division	9	38	14	5	19	73	88	−15	47	12th of 20			1Q	1–0–1			2Q	0–0–1
1996–97	Northern Counties East Premier Division	9	38	11	8	19	45	72	−27	41	15th of 20			1Q	1–0–1			2Q	0–0–1
1997–98	Northern Counties East Premier Division	9	38	12	8	18	56	68	−12	44	16th of 20			PR	0–0–1			2Q	0–0–1
1998–99	Northern Counties East Premier Division	9	38	5	7	26	44	107	-63	22	20th of 20; Relegated			1Q	0–0–1			2Q	0–0–1
1999–2000	Northern Counties East Division 1	10	30	11	5	14	46	36	+8	38	11th of 16			2Q	2–1–1			2R	2–0–2
2000–01	Northern Counties East Division 1	10	30	21	6	3	67	24	+43	69	2nd of 16; Promoted			PR	0–0–1			2R	2–0–1
2001–02	Northern Counties East Premier Division	9	38	20	8	10	70	38	+32	68	4th of 20			2Q	2–1–1			4R	5–0–1
2002–03	Northern Counties East Premier Division	9	38	14	5	19	49	51	−2	47	13th of 20			PR	0–1–1			4R	2–1–1
2003–04	Northern Counties East Premier Division	9	38	19	10	9	67	44	+23	67	5th of 20			2Q	3–0–1			2R	0–0–1
2004–05	Northern Counties East Premier Division	9	38	18	13	7	62	35	+27	67	5th of 20			1Q	1–0–1			4R	4–1–1
2005–06	Northern Counties East Premier Division	9	38	19	9	10	63	42	+21	66	6th of 20			1Q	2–1–1			QF	4–0–1
2006–07	Northern Counties East Premier Division	9	38	16	8	14	61	54	+7	56	9th of 20			PR	1–0–1			2R	0–0–1
2007–08	Northern Counties East Premier Division	9	38	22	7	9	68	42	+26	73	3rd of 20			PR	1–0–1			4R	4–1–1
2008–09	Northern Counties East Premier Division	9	38	17	7	14	81	64	+17	58	9th of 20			1Q	2–0–1			3R	1–0–1
2009–10	Northern Counties East Premier Division	9	38	20	5	13	82	58	+24	65	7th of 20			PR	0–0–1			4R	4–1–1
2010–11	Northern Counties East Premier Division	9	38	18	7	13	81	71	+10	61	7th of 20			EP	0–0–1			2R	0–0–1
2011–12	Northern Counties East Premier Division	9	38	15	6	17	74	75	−1	51	12th of 20			1Q	2–2–1			2Q	0–0–1
2012-3	Northern Counties East Premier Division	9	42	24	5	13	89	49	+40	77	5th of 22			EP	0–1–1			2R	3–0–1
2013–14	Northern Counties East Premier Division	9	44	25	4	15	126	78	+48	79	7th of 23			EP	0–0–1			2Q	0–0–1
2014–15	Northern Counties East Premier Division	9	40	17	8	15	79	82	−3	59	11th of 21			EP	0–0–1			2Q	0–0–1
2015–16	Northern Counties East Premier Division	9	42	24	5	13	94	69	+23	77	6th of 22			PR	1–0–1			1Q	0–0–1
2016–17	Northern Counties East Premier Division	9	42	30	7	5	111	39	+72	97	2nd of 22			PR	1–2–1			2R	3–0–1
2017–18	Northern Counties East Premier Division	9	42	29	9	4	127	52	+75	96	2nd of 22; Promoted			PR	1–0–1			1R	0–0–1
2018–19	Northern Premier League Division 1 East	8	38	8	11	19	45	72	−27	35	16th of 20			1Q	1–0–1	3Q	3–3–1		
2019–20	Northern Premier League Division 1 North West	8	30	4	4	22	37	77	−40	16	Season Abandoned			EP	0–0–1	1Q	1–2–1		
2020–21	Northern Premier League Division 1 North West	8	9	2	1	6	8	19	−8	7	Season Abandoned			PR	0–0–1	3Q	1–0–1		
