= Middle Rainton =

- Location in Tyne and Wear
- 54.819°N 1.492°W
- Location: County Durham and Tyne and Wear, England, UK
- OS grid reference: NZ330472

Middle Rainton was a small village between West Rainton and East Rainton on the boundary of County Durham and the City of Sunderland, north east England. It was subject to a schedule D notice and hence ceased to exist in the 1970s. The site of Middle Rainton is now a Nature Reserve open to the Public. It lies on the A690 road, about 3 miles (5 km) east of the A1(M). The land on which Middle Rainton was built was originally owned by R Heaviside. John Buddle (agent for Lord Londonderry) bought the land in 1820 to build houses for the miners working in the local pits. Wm Fordyce “History and Antiquities of the County Palatine of Durham” Vol 2 notes that the village is “principally occupied by persons engaged in the collieries”. (1) A point reinforced by the Census Returns 1851 to 1891, which show that the vast majority of the males of working age being engaged as miners or other tasks associated with the mine Prior to 1815 Buddle on behalf of Londonderry had been closing Pits in the area but new mining technology had emerged which allowed for the exploitation of deeper coal seams. Between 1816 and 1824, 6 Pits were opened in the immediate area – Adventure (1816), Resolution(1816), Plain(1817), Hazard(1818), Meadows(1824), Alexandrina (1824). (2) In 1851 the Census notes there were 189 Dwellings with 449 males and 393 females a total population of 842. This appears to have been the time of peak occupancy. By 1871 only 155 dwellings were recorded as occupied with 15 as unoccupied and a total population of 726. By 1911 there were 102 dwellings, 277 males, 272 females a total of 549. The 1911 census reports that the Village had its own Police Station – with a resident policeman. The following streets are named at various times : Front Street (the main road between Durham and Sunderland ) West Row, Back Row, Lewis Street, Cross Street, Chapel Row, Slate Row, and in 1871 only, Pipewell Gate. Of these only Front street, was paved (3) The census at various times notes a variety of shops and 4 pubs Fox and Hounds, Rose and Crown, Hope and Anchor and Foresters Arms . The Village boasted a Salvation Army Hall and before that a Primitive Methodist Chapel. The 1851 census records that on Sunday 30 March 1851, 157 people attended the morning service, 150 the afternoon and 200 the evening service at the Methodist Chapel . In 1843 the Black American female Evangelist Zilpha Elaw claimed she preached to a large crowd at Middle Rainton in September 1843 one might assume that either this was an outdoor meeting or was held in the chapel. (11) By 1896 The nearest Pit - the Meadows – was proving to be unprofitable and was closed (2) and this probably explains the drop in the population of the village. From the end of the 19th Century there are reports condemning the state of the houses and the sewage arrangements. In 1899 the Local Medical Officer of Health stated “The sanitary condition of the village of Middle Rainton is reported to be getting worse, Houses are becoming uninhabitable and falling into ruins, and the tenants are so poor that it does not pay the owners to keep them in repair. Four houses reported on by the sanitary inspector are in a very bad state, and it is recommended that they should either be immediately repaired or closed. The open channels at the Freehold, though repaired, are not satisfactory, for “ at the lower “ ends there are frequent accumulations which choke “ up the sinks and cause overflows near the houses “ there.” The scavenging is not satisfactorily performed, and some of the ashpits are reported to be never quite emptied”. (4) While one year later he stated “There is said to be no improvement in the sanitary condition of Middle Rainton, and a large number of the houses are unoccupied and the out-offices in a dilapidated state. The report states that steps are being taken by the R.D.C. to have the insanitary dwellings either closed or repaired. At the Freehold the open channels have been repaired and more attention given to the cleansing of them, “although covered sewers and sinks to each house “ would be beneficial as regards the health of the “ village.” The scavenging of the district is stated not to have been altogether satisfactory, and the cartmen's attention frequently had to be called to their neglect of duty.” (5) In 1904 it was reported “The report again refers to the condition of Middle Rainton, where more houses are vacant and going to ruin, and where most of the insanitary conditions are due to the bad habits of the low-class population living there” (6) Again in 1907 “In the report of the Inspector of Nuisances it is mentioned that ………….At Middle Rainton 36 notices were served upon the owners of property, and, as a result, some of the houses were voluntarily closed and others have been repaired”(7) By 1946 it is clear that the Village is not considered worth saving “The remaining houses in Middle Rainton, however, all drain into a sewer which eventually discharges into a ditch next, the Meadows Colliery. There are a few water-closets installed in these houses and owing to the ditch becoming silted-up, and a restricted flow in dry weather, this method of sewerage disposal has been a source of complaint from time to time. The houses concerned are old and the majority substandard, in fact they might reasonably have been dealt with under the Slum Clearance scheme which eliminated the remainder of this small village, and the installation of an elaborate sewerage system would hardly appear to be justified at the present time” (8) By the 1950s the population was down to 113 with 31 dwellings and John Harvey, an ex-resident, notes that houses were cleared about five at a time and the residents moved to other settlements. Many seem to have moved to the new council estate in East Rainton but others moved to West Rainton and the new town at Peterlee.(3)

The school The village had a primary school situated on the South side of Front Street.(3) It is mentioned in reports dated 1897 and 1901 (4) . However it would appear that conditions were not good. In 1925 the Local Medical Officer of Health noted “At Middle Rainton too, nothing appears to have been done with the exception of conversion of the coal house into a closet for the teachers. I understand that the Educational Authorities contemplate building a new school in the near future to replace the present ones, and this will obviate the necessity of extensive alterations and renewals to structures which are too antique to meet modern requirements” (10) . The new school, at East Rainton, was opened on 26 May 1933(12)

In 1951 the Durham County Council Plan categorised all settlements in the County A to D. Category D settlements ( which included Middle Rainton) were to receive no public funding and were to be allowed to deteriorate out of existence. The inhabitants of some villages successfully fought this and are today thriving communities but others accepted the inevitability of their fate and this appears to have been the case with Middle Rainton. The last house was demolished in 1964. This was the old Fox and Hounds Pub which had long been used as family accommodation (3). A picture in the Northern Echo dated 17 September 1964 shows the last house awaiting demolition. 3 brothers who had lived with other family members in the Fox and Hounds were granted permission to live in caravan on their allotment on the South side of Front street. The last of them died in the 1970s (3) . Although a farm and the old West Rainton Rectory lie within what was once the boundaries of Middle Rainton, the site of the village is now a small nature reserve under the care of Durham County Council. In 2022 members of an environmental group in West Rainton were granted permission by the County Council to use part of the site to establish a Community Orchard. Funds were raised by the group members and from Northumbria Water and the County Durham Community Foundation, 25 trees including apples, pears, damsons cherries, plums were planted .
