= Tommy Harland =

English cricketer (born 1942)

Personal information
- Full name: Thomas Harland
- Born: 15 January 1942 (age 84); Hetton-le-Hole, County Durham, England
- Batting: Left-handed
- Role: Wicket-keeper

Domestic team information
- Years: Team
- 1974–1979: Durham

Career statistics
Competition	List A
Matches	4
Runs scored	26
Batting average	8.66
100s/50s	–/–
Top score	16
Balls bowled	–
Wickets	–
Bowling average	–
5 wickets in innings	–
10 wickets in match	–
Best bowling	–
Catches/stumpings	5/–
- Source: Cricinfo, 7 August 2011

Thomas Harland (born 15 January 1942) was a former English cricketer. Harland was a left-handed batsman who fielded as a wicket-keeper. He was born in Hetton-le-Hole, County Durham.

Harland made his debut for Durham against Staffordshire in the 1974 Minor Counties Championship. He played Minor counties cricket for Durham from 1974 to 1979, making 30 Minor Counties Championship appearances. He made his List A debut against Hertfordshire in the 1974 Gillette Cup. He made 3 further List A appearances, the last of which came against Yorkshire in the 1978 Gillette Cup. In his 4 List A matches, he scored 26 runs at an average of 8.66, with a high score of 16. Behind the stumps he took 5 catches.
