= Great Eppleton =

Hamlet in Tyne and Wear, England

Coordinates: 54.8271°N 1.4276°W

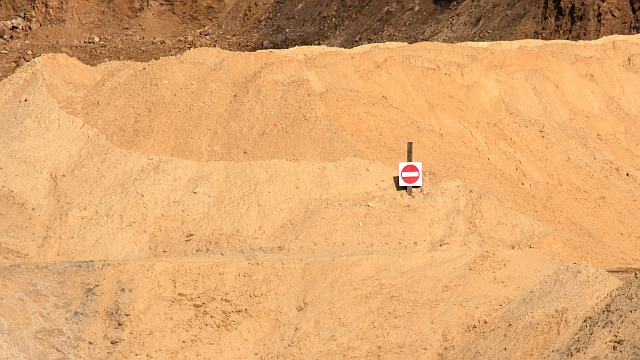
- No entry sign, Eppleton Quarry, in the former parish

- Location within Tyne and Wear
- Civil parish: Hetton
- Metropolitan borough: Sunderland
- Metropolitan county: Tyne and Wear
- Region: North East
- Country: England
- Sovereign state: United Kingdom

Great Eppleton is a hamlet in the civil parish of Hetton, in the Sunderland district, in the county of Tyne and Wear, England. It is about 6 miles south west of Sunderland city centre. Until 1974 it was in County Durham. In 1931 the parish had a population of 38. Today it consists of 2 farms.

== History ==
The name "Eppleton" means 'Valley growing with apple-trees'. The earliest known reference for "Eplinden" is 1273. Great Eppleton was formerly a township in the parish of Houghton-le-Spring, in 1866 Great Eppleton became a separate civil parish and was in Houghton le Spring Rural District, on 1 April 1937 the parish was abolished to form "Hetton" and became part of Hetton Urban District. In 1974 Hetton Urban district was abolished and Great Eppleton became part of the metropolitan borough of Sunderland in the metropolitan county of Tyne and Wear.

== See also ==
- Great Eppleton Wind Farm
