= Dennis Antal =

English footballer (born 2005)

Personal information
- Full name: Dennis Zsombor Antal
- Date of birth: 26 April 2005 (age 21)
- Position: Midfielder

Team information
- Current team: MTK Budapest II
- Number: 6

Youth career
- Leyton Orient
- Crystal Palace
- Shrewsbury Town

Senior career*
Years	Team	Apps	(Gls)
2022–2023	Shrewsbury Town	0	(0)
2023–	MTK Budapest II	54	(2)
- * Club domestic league appearances and goals as of 12:13, 7 May 2025 (UTC)

Dennis Antal (born 26 April 2005) is an English-Hungarian professional footballer who plays as a midfielder for MTK Budapest II.

== Career ==
Antal made his senior debut for Shrewsbury Town on 30 August 2022, in a 2–1 defeat to Wolverhampton Wanderers U21 at the New Meadow.

== Career statistics ==
As of match played 20 September 2022

Appearances and goals by club, season and competition
Club	Season	League			FA Cup		EFL Cup		Other		Total	
Club	Season	Division	Apps	Goals	Apps	Goals	Apps	Goals	Apps	Goals	Apps	Goals
Shrewsbury Town	2022–23	EFL League One	0	0	0	0	0	0	2 (Note: Appearances in the EFL Trophy.)	0	2	0
Career total			0	0	0	0	0	0	2	0	2	0
