= Albert H. Oswald =

English composer

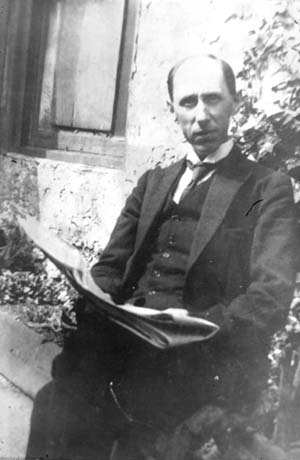
Albert H. Oswald

Albert Heckles Oswald (Hetton-le-Hole, 1879 – 1929) was an English composer and organist.

Albert Oswald was born to Robert Oswald, a shoemaker, and his wife Jane Oswald (née Thompson). He composed many pieces for piano in light classical style, in the heyday of Edwardian Salon music. He was well known for his Wright Pianoforte Tutor.

== Selected works ==
=== Tutors ===
- The Wright Pianoforte Tutor
- The Wright Edition, Albert H Oswald's First Book of 36 Melodious Studies for the Pianoforte

=== Other ===
- 21 Marches for the Schoolroom, for piano
- 31 Organ Voluntaries – 1912
- Album of Piano Duets – 1912
- Orange Blossom, Valse, for piano – 1910
- Spring Violets, Valse, for piano – 1900
- Adelina, for piano – 1912
- Alpine Shepherd, for piano
- Autumn Leaves, Mazurka, for piano – 1908
- Autumn Memories, Characteristic Piece – 1907
- Contre-Danse, for piano – 1912
- Cora, for piano – 1912
- Coringa, for piano – 1912
- The Dance of the Goblins, for piano – 1910
- The Doll's Parade, March, for piano – 1912
- Dusky Queen, Cake Walk, for piano – 1912
- Festival of Roses, Intermezzo, for piano – 1913
- Flower Queen, Valse, for piano – 1910
- Gay Cavaliers, Polka, for piano – 1908
- Gipsy Queen, Tarantella, for piano, etc. – 1910
- Glittering Stars, for piano
- Golden Sunset, Valse, for piano – 1910
- Happy Moments, Mazurka, for piano – 1910
- Les Courtiers, Minuet and Trio, for piano, etc. – 1910
- Little Red-Riding Hood, Polka, for piano – 1912
- Londonderry Air (traditional Irish Air), for piano – 1927
- Merry Haymakers, for piano – 1912
- Moonbeams, for piano
- A Motor Ride, fort piano
- The New Century, Barn Dance, for piano – 1912
- Our Princess, for piano (A tribute to Mary, Princess Royal on the occasion of her marriage) – 1922
- Parma Violets, Valse, for piano, cello and violin
- Peep o'Day, for piano – 1912
- Pomponette, for piano – 1921
- The Portland Series of Violin and Piano Music, etc., for violin and piano −1912
- Reflections – Intermezzo, for piano
- Revellers, Galop, for piano – 1910
- Rippling Waves, Barcarolle, for piano – 1908
- The River Girl. for piano
- Royal Guards, Polka, for piano – 1910
- Scotch Lassie, Schottische, for piano – 1912
- Scout & Guide Marches – also suitable for schools, etc., for piano
- Sinetta, Air de Ballet, for piano
- Sparkling Emerald, Barn Dance, for piano – 1910
- Sunny Wavelets, Valse, for piano – 1908
- Sylvan Echoes, for piano
- The Swallow's Message, for piano – 1890
- Tiny Tots, Vocal Waltz, for piano (and voice) – 1912
- Valse Estrella, for piano – 1913
- Valse Florentine, for piano
- Verona, Stately Dance, for piano −1910
- Water Fairies, Valse, for piano
