= Parish council =

Parish council may refer to:

- Pastoral council (Catholic Church)
- Parish councils in England
- Civil parishes in Scotland
- Parochial church council
