= Waylon Renecke =

South African footballer (born 2006)

Personal information
- Full name: Waylon Ramon Renecke
- Date of birth: 12 May 2006 (age 20)
- Place of birth: Peterborough, England
- Height: 1.84 m (6 ft 0 in)
- Position: Centre-back

Team information
- Current team: Hammarby

Youth career
- –2023: Norwich City
- 2024–2025: Copenhagen

Senior career*
Years	Team	Apps	(Gls)
2024–2026	Copenhagen	0	(0)
2025	→ Örgryte (loan)	13	(0)
2026	→ Esbjerg (loan)	11	(1)
2026–	Hammarby	8	(1)

International career^{‡}
2021	England U15	1	(0)
2021–2022	England U16	6	(0)
2022–2023	England U17	5	(0)
2023	South Africa U17	4	(0)
- * Club domestic league appearances and goals as of 7 November 2026 ‡ National team caps and goals as of 01:34, 19 November 2025 (UTC)

Waylon Ramon Renecke (born 12 May 2006) is a professional footballer who plays as a centre-back for Allsvenskan club Hammarby. Born in England, he represents South Africa at youth level.
