= Josh Robinson (footballer) =

English footballer (born 2004)

Personal information
- Full name: Josh Noah Lynnford Robinson
- Date of birth: 20 December 2004 (age 21)
- Place of birth: Leytonstone, England
- Height: 1.80 m (5 ft 11 in)
- Position: Defender

Team information
- Current team: Aldershot Town
- Number: 30

Youth career
- Arsenal
- 2025: Wigan Athletic

Senior career*
Years	Team	Apps	(Gls)
2026	Kidderminster Harriers	7	(0)
2026–	Aldershot Town	0	(0)

International career
2021	England U18	1	(0)
- * Club domestic league appearances and goals as of 21:10, 1 May 2026 (UTC)

Josh Noah Lynnford Robinson (born 20 December 2004) is an English professional footballer who plays as a defender for Aldershot Town.

== Club career ==
Born in Leytonstone, Robinson began his career with Arsenal, before signing with Wigan Athletic in January 2025. In February 2025, Wigan manager Shaun Maloney said Robinson would likely feature in the first-team. Robinson left Wigan in September 2025, without making a first-team appearance for the club.

In March 2026 he signed for Kidderminster Harriers. He was released by the club at the end of the season.

On 6 November 2026, Robinson joined Aldershot Town.

== International career ==
Robinson was born in England to a Jamaican father and Malaysian mother of English heritage. He was eligible to play for all three senior teams.

He made his first appearance for the England under-18s in a 3–0 win over Russia in October 2021.

== Career statistics ==
As of match played 7 November 2026

Appearances and goals by club, season and competition
Club	Season	League			FA Cup		EFL Cup		Other		Total	
Club	Season	Division	Apps	Goals	Apps	Goals	Apps	Goals	Apps	Goals	Apps	Goals
Kidderminster Harriers	2025–26	National League	8	0	0	0	—		2 (Note: Appearances in National League play-offs)	0	10	0
Aldershot Town	2026–27	National League	0	0	1	0	—		0	0	1	0
Career total			8	0	1	0	0	0	2	0	12	0
