= East Rainton =

Coordinates: 54.821777°N 1.481167°W

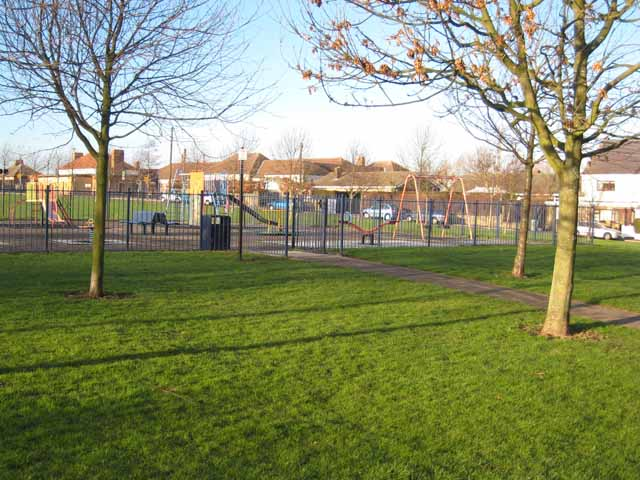
- Playground

- Location within Tyne and Wear
- Civil parish: Hetton
- Metropolitan borough: Sunderland
- Metropolitan county: Tyne and Wear
- Region: North East
- Country: England
- Sovereign state: United Kingdom
- Post town: HOUGHTON LE SPRING
- Postcode district: DH5
- Dialling code: 0191
- Police: Northumbria
- Fire: Tyne and Wear
- Ambulance: North East
- UK Parliament: Houghton and Sunderland South

East Rainton is a village and former civil parish, now in the parish of Hetton, in the Sunderland district, in the county of Tyne and Wear, England. It is situated alongside the A690 road between Sunderland and Durham, near Houghton-le-Spring. In 1931 the parish had a population of 1711. East Rainton was formerly a township and chapelry in the parish of Houghton-le-Spring, from 1866 East Rainton was a civil parish in its own right, on 1 April 1937 the parish was abolished to form Hetton, part also went to Houghton le Spring.

The village is home to East Rainton cricket club, which was founded before 1851 and which has seen many successes throughout its long history. The 2nd XI are current North East Durham League champions. The village also boasts a football team: East Rainton FC, the second team from the village to bear the name.

The village once had four pubs: 'The Rose and Crown', 'The Blacksmiths Arms', 'The Village Tavern' and the last-remaining 'The Olde Ships Inn' (previously known as 'The Travellers Rest' - a name derived from it being a staging post on the Durham to Sunderland coaching road which passed through the village). The Olde Ships Inn is now an Italian restaurant called Angelo’s.

Other village facilities include a small premier shop, East Rainton Primary School, the church of St Cuthbert, and the Methodist chapel. The village post office closed in 2011 and its space was used to expand the local shop.

The village is located just by the outskirts of Durham on the area of high ground to the south of Houghton-le-Spring, and the name Rainton is thought to stem from the Anglo-Saxon - Rennington or Renn's settlement.
