= Temple Ojinnaka =

Italian footballer (born 2005)

Personal information
- Full name: Temple Uchenna Ojinnaka
- Date of birth: 30 March 2005 (age 21)
- Place of birth: Venice, Italy
- Positions: Defender; midfielder

Team information
- Current team: Wolverhampton Wanderers
- Number: 57

Youth career
- 2017–2025: Wolverhampton Wanderers

Senior career*
Years	Team	Apps	(Gls)
2025–	Wolverhampton Wanderers	0	(0)
2026	→ Shrewsbury Town (loan)	4	(0)
- * Club domestic league appearances and goals as of 20:52, 7 April 2026 (UTC)

Temple Uchenna Ojinnaka (born 30 March 2005) is an Italian professional footballer who plays as a defender and midfielder for Wolverhampton Wanderers.

== Career ==
Born in Venice, Ojinnaka began his career at Wolverhampton Wanderers at the age of 12, turning professional in February 2023.

He moved on loan to Shrewsbury Town in January 2026. He said he was looking forward to playing senior football. However, he struggled for playing time.
