= Koby Mottoh =

English footballer (born 2006)

Personal information
- Full name: Kendra Koby Reuben Chidiyelum Mottoh
- Date of birth: 31 August 2006 (age 20)
- Position: Forward

Team information
- Current team: Moreirense
- Number: 77

Youth career
- 2013–2021: Arsenal
- 2022–2024: Portsmouth

Senior career*
Years	Team	Apps	(Gls)
2023–2024	Portsmouth	0	(0)
2024–2026	Bournemouth	0	(0)
2026–	Moreirense	0	(0)
- * Club domestic league appearances and goals as of 9 September 2026

Kendra Koby Reuben Chidiyelum Mottoh (born 31 August 2006) is an English professional footballer who plays as a forward for Primeira Liga club Moreirense.

== Career ==
Mottoh spent nine years with the Arsenal academy before being released at the age of 14. He was subsequently taken in on a two-year scholarship by Portsmouth following a successful trial. He scored 15 goals in his first 18 appearances playing wing-back for the academy. He made his senior debut as a second-year scholar on 8 August 2023, coming on as an 86th-minute substitute in a 3–1 win at Forest Green Rovers in the EFL Cup. At the time the 16 year-old was the youngest second-year scholar in the country. He earned his first start at Fratton Park on 23 August, in a 3–3 draw with Fulham U21 in the EFL Trophy. In July 2024, Mottoh signed his first professional contract with Premier League club Bournemouth. In July 2026, following his release from Bournemouth, he signed for Portuguese club Moreirense.

== Style of play ==
Mottoh is a forward with strong dribbling and 1v1 skills.

== Career statistics ==
As of match played 19 December 2023

Appearances and goals by club, season and competition
Club	Season	League			FA Cup		EFL Cup		Other		Total	
Club	Season	Division	Apps	Goals	Apps	Goals	Apps	Goals	Apps	Goals	Apps	Goals
Portsmouth	2023–24	EFL League One	0	0	0	0	2	0	3 (Note: Appearance(s) in EFL Trophy)	0	5	0
Career total			0	0	0	0	2	0	3	0	5	0
