= Dacey =

Dacey is a surname. Notable people with the surname include:

- Amy Dacey, American politician
- Austin Dacey (born 1972), American philosopher, writer and activist
- Gavin Dacey (born 1984), Welsh rugby union player
- John Dacey (1854–1912), Australian politician
- Kristian Dacey (born 1989), Welsh rugby union player
- Malcolm Dacey (born 1960), Welsh rugby union player
- Mark Dacey (born 1966), Canadian curler
- Sebastian Dacey (born 1982), German artist
