= Finley Welch =

English footballer (born 2004)

Personal information
- Full name: Finley Paul Welch
- Date of birth: 3 October 2004 (age 22)
- Position: Midfielder

Team information
- Current team: Maidenhead United
- Number: 16

Youth career
- 2015–2026: Norwich City

Senior career*
Years	Team	Apps	(Gls)
2024–2026	Norwich City	1	(0)
2024	→ Boston United (loan)	2	(0)
2026	Chungbuk Cheongju	4	(0)
2026–	Maidenhead United	9	(1)
- * Club domestic league appearances and goals as of 17:36, 12 September 2026 (UTC)

Finley Paul Welch (born 3 October 2004) is an English professional footballer who plays as a midfielder for Maidenhead United.

== Career ==
Welch joined Norwich City aged eleven, progressing through the academy ranks to sign a first professional contract in December 2022. He signed a new contract in October 2023, keeping him with the club until 2026 with an option for a further year.

Having signed a new contract, both Welch and fellow academy player Ken Aboh both started training with the first team. On 6 March 2024, Welch made his senior debut for the club as a substitute in a 3–1 Championship defeat to Middlesbrough.

In October 2024, Welch joined National League club Boston United on an initial one-month youth loan. He sustained a knee injury during his second appearance, and it was confirmed in November that he would miss the remainder of the season. Having undergone surgery for this injury, he returned to playing with Norwich City's Development Squad in September 2025.

On 5 January 2026, Welch departed Norwich City by mutual consent. Three days later he signed for K League 2 club Chungbuk Cheongju. After four appearances, he returned to England to sign for Maidenhead United on 4 August 2026.

== Career statistics ==
As of 12 September 2026

Appearances and goals by club, season and competition
Club	Season	League			FA Cup		League Cup		Other		Total	
Club	Season	Division	Apps	Goals	Apps	Goals	Apps	Goals	Apps	Goals	Apps	Goals
Norwich City	2023–24	Championship	1	0	0	0	0	0	—		1	0
Norwich City	2024–25	Championship	0	0	0	0	0	0	—		0	0
Norwich City	Total		1	0	0	0	0	0	0	0	1	0
Boston United (loan)	2024–25	National League	2	0	0	0	—		0	0	2	0
Chungbuk Cheongju	2026	K League 2	4	0	0	0	—		0	0	4	0
Maidenhead United	2026–27	National League South	9	1	0	0	—		0	0	9	1
Career total			16	1	0	0	0	0	0	0	16	1
