= Great Eppleton Wind Farm =

Wind farm in Tyne and Wear, England

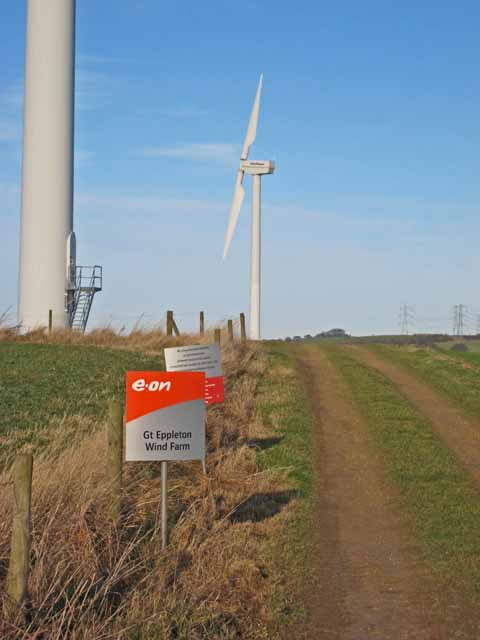
- Twin-bladed turbines at Great Eppleton Wind Farm
- Country: England, United Kingdom
- Location: Near Great Eppleton, Tyne and Wear
- Coordinates: 54°49′59″N 1°25′46″W
- Status: Operational
- Construction began: 1997
- Commission date: Repowered in March 2010
- Site elevation: 480 ft

Power generation
- Units operational: 4 x 2 MW
- Make and model: REPower: MM92
- Nameplate capacity: 8 MW

External links
- Website: www.eon-uk.com/generation/greateppleton.aspx
- Commons: Related media on Commons

Great Eppleton Wind Farm is a wind farm near Great Eppleton, Tyne and Wear, England. It is owned and operated by E.ON UK. Constructed in 1997, it was notable for originally consisting of twin-bladed turbines, as most wind turbines have three blades. On 29 September, E.ON announced it would replace these with four new REpower MM92 turbines giving a nameplate capacity of 8.2 MW.
