= Easington Lane =

Coordinates: 54.806°N 1.4323°W

- Location within Tyne and Wear
- Population: 4,044
- OS grid reference: NZ364460
- Civil parish: Hetton
- Metropolitan borough: City of Sunderland
- Metropolitan county: Tyne and Wear
- Region: North East
- Country: England
- Sovereign state: United Kingdom
- Post town: Houghton-le-Spring
- Postcode district: DH5
- Dialling code: 0191
- Police: Northumbria
- Fire: Tyne and Wear
- Ambulance: North East
- UK Parliament: Houghton and Sunderland South

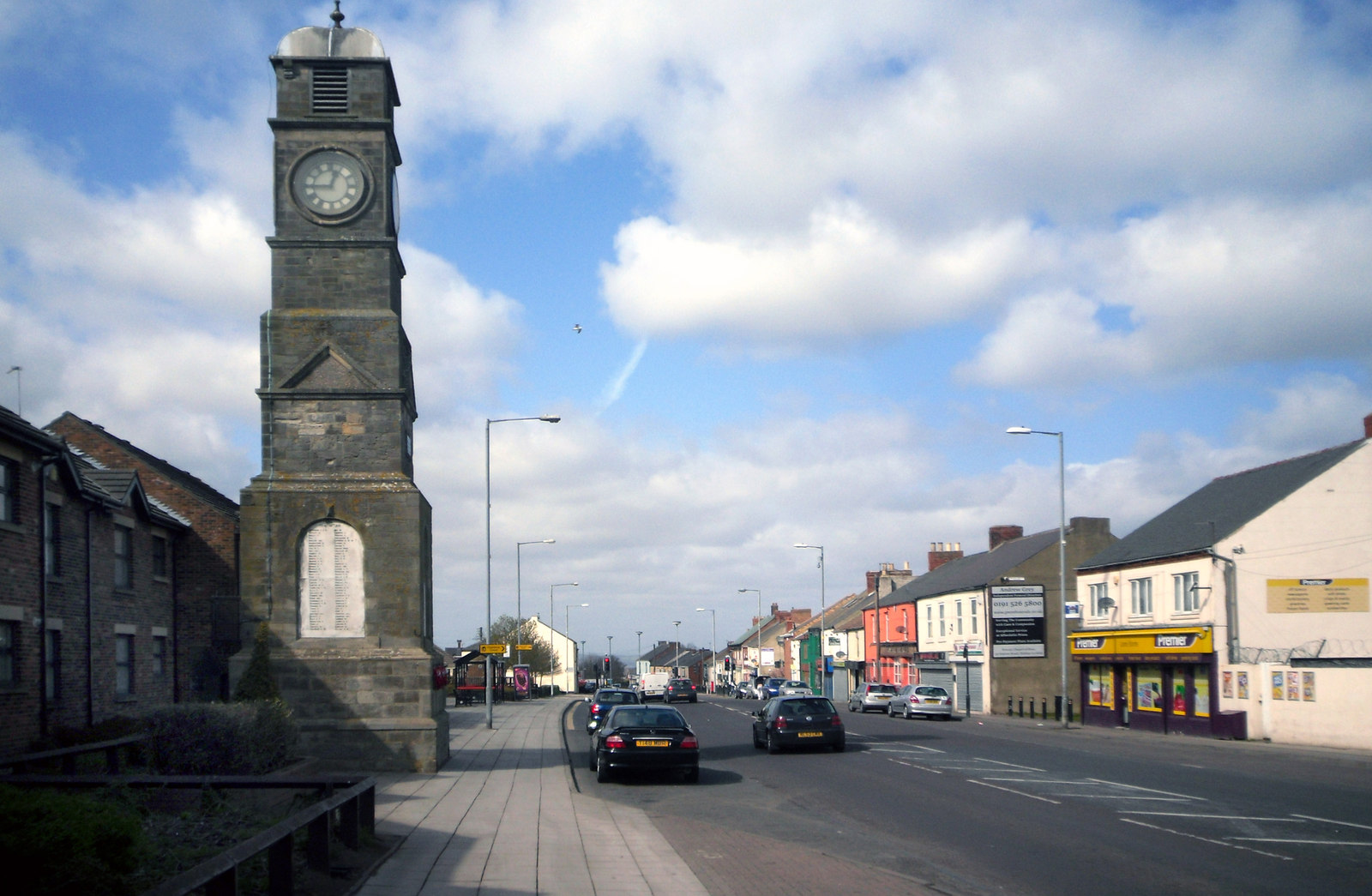
Memorial Clock Tower, Easington Lane

Easington Lane is a village in the City of Sunderland metropolitan borough in the county of Tyne and Wear, North East England. Historically part of County Durham and located between Hetton-le-Hole, Seaham, Peterlee and Durham. It had a population of 4,044 at the 2001 Census, increasing to 7,193 at the 2011 Census.

== Amenities ==
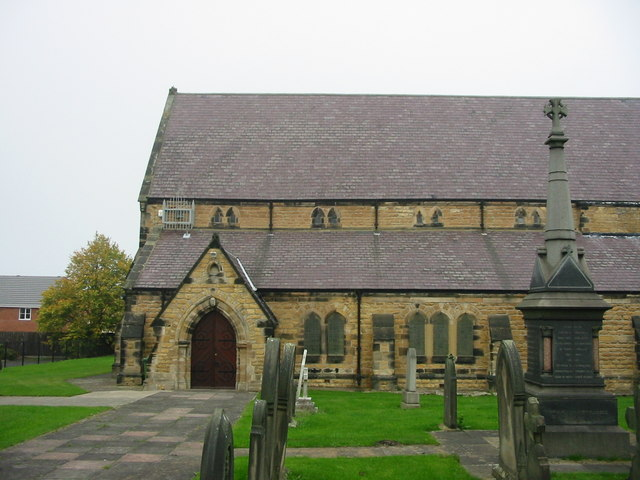
St Michael and All Angels Church, Easington Lane

The village contains a small shopping center on the A182 road between Peterlee and Washington and also is home to the parish church of the village, St Michael and All Angels.

== Transport ==
The village is served by buses operated by Go North East who provided services to Newcastle-upon-Tyne, Sunderland, Peterlee, Washington, Houghton-le-Spring and Hetton-le-Hole The village is also close to the A1(M). The village was served by two railway lines (both of which are now closed). It was served by the Leamside Line and Durham and Sunderland Railway. There were stations at Hetton and South Hetton. The nearest active stations to the village are in Chester-le-Street, Sunderland, Horden and Durham.
