= Charlie Deacey =

English footballer

Personal information
- Full name: Charles Deacey
- Date of birth: 6 October 1889
- Place of birth: Wednesbury, England
- Date of death: 1952 (aged 62–63)
- Height: 5 ft 10 in (1.78 m)
- Position: Centre-half

Senior career*
Years	Team	Apps	(Gls)
1908–1909	Wednesbury Town		
1909–1910	Wednesbury Old Athletic		
1910–1914	West Bromwich Albion	18	(0)
1914–1920	Hull City	75	(4)
1920–1923	Grimsby Town	90	(4)
1923–1924	Pontypridd		
1924–1925	Merthyr Town	0	(0)
- * Club domestic league appearances and goals

Charles Deacey (6 October 1889 – 1952) was an English professional footballer who played as a centre-half.
