= Ernie Weaver =

English footballer

Personal information
- Full name: Ernie Luke Weaver
- Date of birth: 8 September 2006 (age 20)
- Place of birth: Sheffield, England
- Position: Centre back

Team information
- Current team: Sheffield Wednesday
- Number: 30

Youth career
- –2025: Sheffield Wednesday

Senior career*
Years	Team	Apps	(Gls)
2025–	Sheffield Wednesday	10	(0)
- * Club domestic league appearances and goals as of 21:00, 11 November 2026 (UTC)

Ernie Luke Weaver (born 8 September 2006) is an English professional footballer who plays as a defender for EFL League One side Sheffield Wednesday.

== Early life ==
He went to school at Wales High School in Kiveton Park.

== Club career ==
=== Sheffield Wednesday ===
He started his Sheffield Wednesday two-year scholarship ahead of the 2023–24 season. He became U18 captain before signing his first professional contract with the club in July 2025. On the 13 August 2025, Weaver made his professional debut against Bolton Wanderers in the EFL Cup, where the young Owls side would draw 3–3 against the League One side, eventually winning the game on penalties. Three days later, he made his senior league debut, replacing Max Lowe on the 85th minute against Stoke City. At the start of September, manager Henrik Pedersen moved Weaver, alongside teammates Reece Johnson, Jarvis Thornton and goalkeeper Logan Stretch into the first team dressing room. The following week he started his first Championship game, starting in a 2–0 win against Portsmouth, Wednesday's first win of the season. He started the following two games in September which would earn him the club player of the month. However, going into the next international break, it was revealed Weaver had been playing with a foot injury and would likely miss months of the season. Following the end of the 2025–26 season, the new ownership at Sheffield Wednesday exercised their one year option to keep him at the club until 2027.

He returned to first-team football for the 2026–27 season, coming off the bench against Wycombe Wanderers in September 2026.

== Personal life ==
In August 2025, Sky claimed during his debut against Bolton Wanderers that Weaver was the son of former footballer and coach Nicky Weaver, who also played for Sheffield Wednesday, however this is not true.

== Career statistics ==
As of 11 November 2026

Appearances and goals by club, season and competition
Club	Season	League			FA Cup		EFL Cup		Other		Total	
Club	Season	Division	Apps	Goals	Apps	Goals	Apps	Goals	Apps	Goals	Apps	Goals
Sheffield Wednesday	2025–26	Championship	6	0	0	0	3	0	—		9	0
Sheffield Wednesday	2026–27	League One	4	0	1	0	0	0	2 (Note: Appearance(s) in EFL Trophy)	0	7	0
Career total			10	0	1	0	3	0	2	0	16	0
