= Logan Stretch =

Welsh footballer

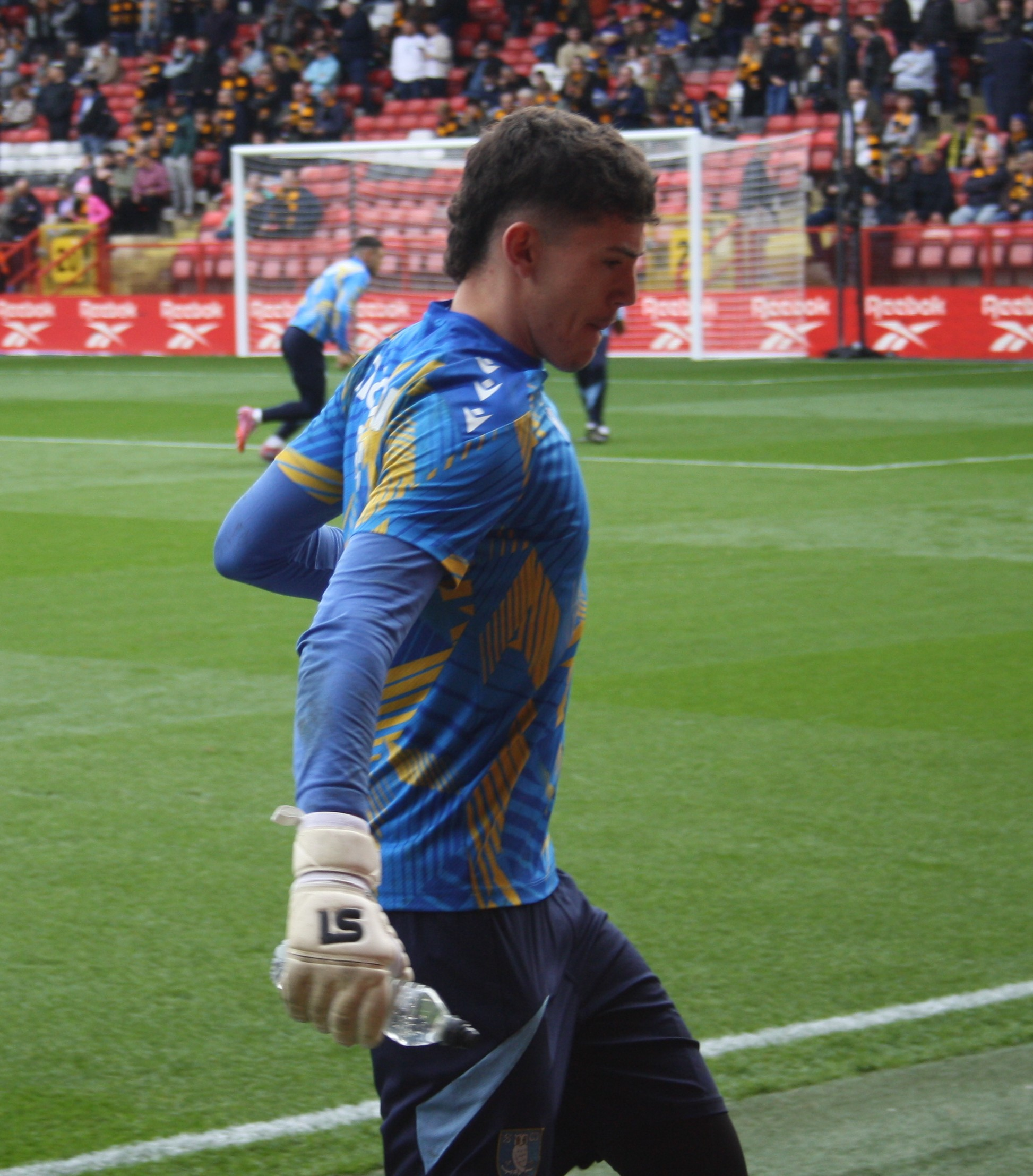
- Stretch at Sheffield Wednesday in 2025

Personal information
- Full name: Logan Scott Stretch
- Date of birth: 4 November 2006 (age 20)
- Height: 6 ft 2 in (1.88 m)
- Position: Goalkeeper

Team information
- Current team: Buxton (on loan from Sheffield Wednesday)
- Number: 1

Youth career
- –2023: Liverpool
- 2023–2026: Sheffield Wednesday

Senior career*
Years	Team	Apps	(Gls)
2026–	Sheffield Wednesday	0	(0)
2026–	→ Buxton (loan)	15	(0)

International career^{‡}
2022–2023	Wales U16	4	(0)
2023	Wales U17	1	(0)
2025–2026	Wales U19	7	(0)
- * Club domestic league appearances and goals as of 17:17, 21 November 2026 (UTC) ‡ National team caps and goals as of 15:01, 4 July 2026 (UTC)

Logan Scott Stretch (born 4 November 2006) is a professional footballer who plays as a goalkeeper for National League North club Buxton on loan from EFL League One side Sheffield Wednesday.

== Club career ==
=== Sheffield Wednesday ===
He joined Sheffield Wednesday as an apprentice in 2023, later signing his first professional contract in the summer of 2025. At the beginning of the 2025–26 season he would be the second choice goalkeeper behind Pierce Charles making the bench for the opening day fixture. At the start of September, manager Henrik Pedersen moved Stretch, alongside teammates Reece Johnson, Jarvis Thornton and Ernie Weaver into the first team dressing room. On 10 January 2026, Stretch made his debut against Brentford in the FA Cup, having to replace the injured Pierce Charles on 60 minutes. Following the end of the 2025–26 season, the new ownership at Sheffield Wednesday exercised their one year option to keep him at the club until 2027.

On 20 July 2026, Stretch signed a season-long loan with National League North club Buxton for the 2026–27 season. He made his debut on the opening day of the season, where Buxton beat Hereford 2–1.

== International career ==
In October 2023, Stretch was called up to the Wales U17 squad. In June 2026, he was called up for the Wales U19 squad to play in the 2026 European Under-19 Championship. In September 2026, he received his first call up to the Wales U21 squad.

== Career statistics ==
As of 21 November 2026

Club	Season	League			FA Cup		EFL Cup		Other		Total	
Club	Season	Division	Apps	Goals	Apps	Goals	Apps	Goals	Apps	Goals	Apps	Goals
Sheffield Wednesday	2025–26	Championship	0	0	1	0	0	0	—		1	0
Sheffield Wednesday	2026–27	League One	0	0	0	0	0	0	—		0	0
Sheffield Wednesday	Total		0	0	1	0	0	0	0	0	1	0
Buxton (loan)	2026–27	National League North	15	0	2	0	—		1 (Note: Appearance(s) in FA Trophy)	0	18	0
Career total			15	0	3	0	0	0	1	0	19	0
