= Bruno Fernandes (footballer, born 2006) =

Portuguese footballer (born 2006)

Personal information
- Full name: Bruno Henrique Vilela De Carvalho Fernandes
- Date of birth: 9 January 2006 (age 20)
- Position: Attacking midfielder

Team information
- Current team: Sheffield Wednesday

Youth career
- –2025: Sheffield Wednesday

Senior career*
Years	Team	Apps	(Gls)
2025–	Sheffield Wednesday	4	(0)
- * Club domestic league appearances and goals as of 13:59, 8 February 2026 (UTC)

Bruno Henrique Vilela De Carvalho Fernandes (born 9 January 2006) is a Portuguese professional footballer who plays as a midfielder for EFL League One side Sheffield Wednesday.

== Club career ==
In March 2024, Fernandes and Sheffield Wednesday teammate Jarvis Thornton were both nominated for the February LFE Goal of the Month, with Fernandes rounding off a neat team move with a blistering top corner effort early in the second half. He signed his first professional contract with the club on 3 July 2024. After a summer of turmoil, he joined the first team ahead of the 2025–26 season. On the 13 August 2025, he would make his professional debut in the EFL Cup against Bolton Wanderers which would see the young Owls side draw 3–3 with the League One side before winning on penalties – however Fernandes was replaced by Sean Fusire just before half time after picking up a nasty looking injury which would see him taken to hospital. In November, he made his senior league debut, replacing Jamal Lowe late on against West Bromwich Albion. Following the end of the 2025–26 season, the club confirmed that they had offered him a new contract.

== Career statistics ==
As of end of 2025–26 season

Club	Season	League			FA Cup		EFL Cup		Other		Total	
Club	Season	Division	Apps	Goals	Apps	Goals	Apps	Goals	Apps	Goals	Apps	Goals
Sheffield Wednesday	2025–26	Championship	4	0	0	0	1	0	0	0	5	0
Sheffield Wednesday	2026–27	League One	0	0	0	0	0	0	0	0	0	0
Career total			4	0	0	0	1	0	0	0	5	0
