= William Grainger (footballer) =

Welsh footballer

Personal information
- Full name: William Charlie Grainger
- Date of birth: 20 November 2008 (age 17)
- Height: 5 ft 8 in (1.73 m)
- Position: Centre forward

Team information
- Current team: Sheffield Wednesday
- Number: 19

Youth career
- 2005–2006: Doncaster Rovers
- 2006–2025: Sheffield Wednesday

Senior career*
Years	Team	Apps	(Gls)
2025–	Sheffield Wednesday	7	(1)

International career^{‡}
2022–2023	Wales U15	5	(2)
2023–2024	Wales U16	10	(0)
2024–2025	Wales U17	9	(7)
2025	Wales U18	3	(0)
2025–	Wales U19	12	(2)
- * Club domestic league appearances and goals as of 19:58, 8 November 2026 (UTC) ‡ National team caps and goals as of 16:03, 17 November 2026 (UTC)

William Charlie Grainger (born 20 November 2008) is a Welsh professional footballer who plays as a forward for EFL League One side Sheffield Wednesday.

== Early life ==
He went to school at Wales High School in Kiveton Park.

== Club career ==
=== Sheffield Wednesday ===
Whilst at U16 level, he contributed to 48 goals for the Owls and Wales U17s, whilst also scoring 14 goals for Wednesday's U18, Grainger started his two-year scholarship at Sheffield Wednesday in May 2025. At the beginning of the 2025–2026 season he made the first team squads against Bolton Wanderers in the EFL Cup and Wrexham in the Championship. He made his senior debut at 16 years old against Leeds United in the EFL Cup when he came on to replace other debutant George Brown. On 25 February 2026, he made his Championship debut, replacing Jamal Lowe late in the 0–2 defeat against Norwich City. On 25 April 2026, he scored his first senior goal away to Oxford United, pulling one back in an eventual 1–4 defeat. He made his full debut on the final day of the season against West Bromwich Albion, playing 55 minutes before being replaced by Charlie McNeill. In the summer of 2026, there was reported Premier League interest from Everton whilst he was holding talks with Wednesday, however he decided to sign his first professional contract at Wednesday, signing a 3 year contract until the summer of 2029.

== International career ==
He was selected for Wales U16 to compete in the Victory Shield. At 16 he was selected for the Wales U19 squad but didn't make an appearance. He got his first call up Wales U18 just after he made his senior debut for Sheffield Wednesday in August 2025. He made his Wales U19 debut in November 2025 against Japan U19 where he got a goal and assist within the opening 11 minutes of the game.

== Career statistics ==
As of 8 November 2026

Club	Season	League			FA Cup		EFL Cup		Other		Total	
Club	Season	Division	Apps	Goals	Apps	Goals	Apps	Goals	Apps	Goals	Apps	Goals
Sheffield Wednesday	2025–26	Championship	6	1	1	0	1	0	—		8	1
Sheffield Wednesday	2026–27	League One	1	0	1	0	2	0	1 (Note: Appearance(s) in EFL Trophy)	0	5	0
Career total			7	1	2	0	3	0	1	0	13	1
