= Joe Emery =

English footballer

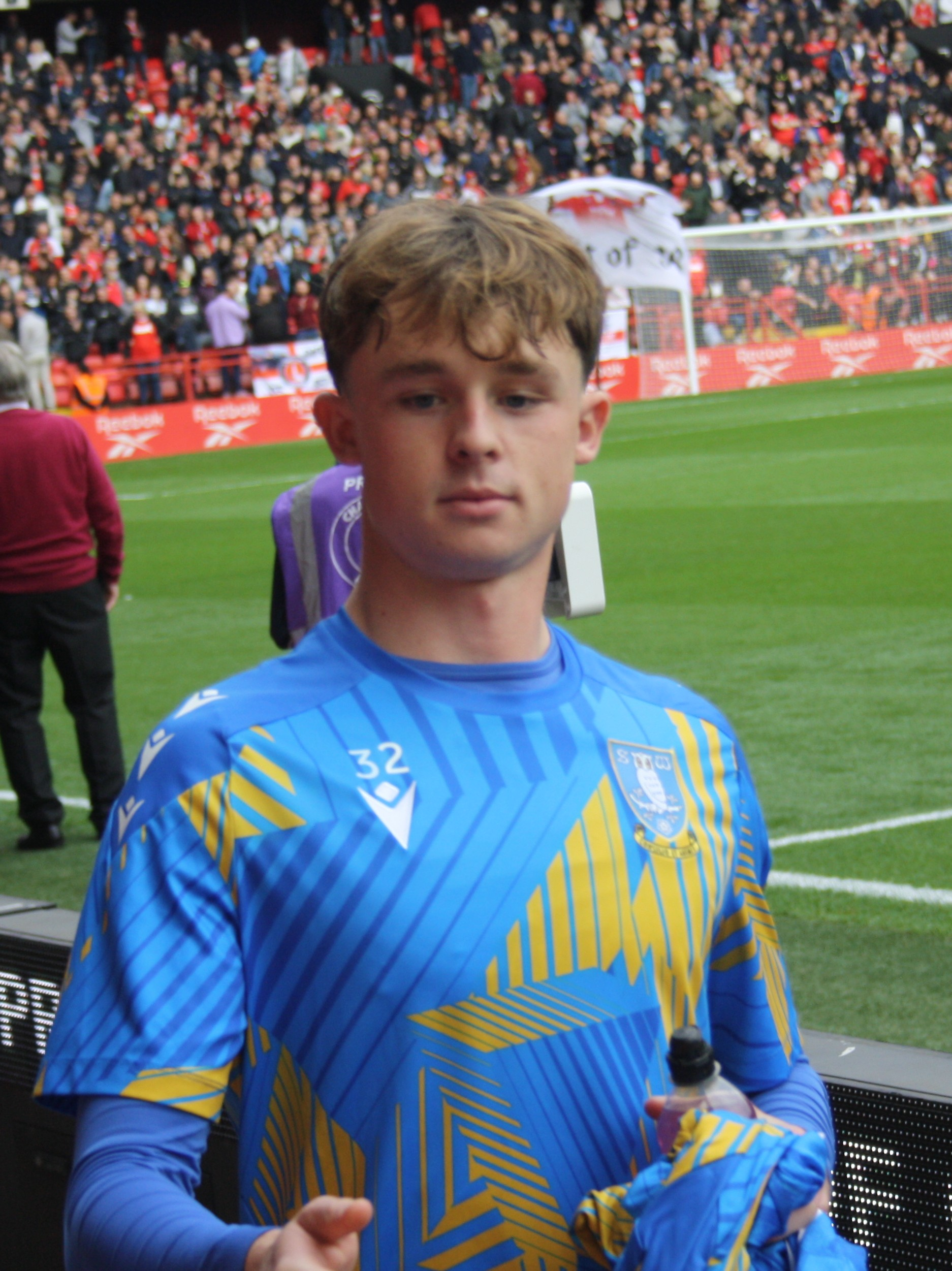
- Joe Emery in 2025

Personal information
- Full name: Joseph Alfred Emery
- Date of birth: 18 April 2007 (age 19)
- Height: 6 ft 1 in (1.85 m)
- Position: Centre back

Team information
- Current team: South Shields (on loan from Sheffield Wednesday)
- Number: 32

Youth career
- Charlton Athletic
- –2025: Sheffield Wednesday

Senior career*
Years	Team	Apps	(Gls)
2025–	Sheffield Wednesday	3	(0)
2026–	→ South Shields (loan)	8	(0)
- * Club domestic league appearances and goals as of 17:18, 21 November 2026 (UTC)

Joseph Alfred Emery (born 18 April 2007) is an English professional footballer who plays as a defender for National League North club South Shields on loan from EFL League One side Sheffield Wednesday.

== Club career ==
=== Sheffield Wednesday ===
Emery joined Sheffield Wednesday from Charlton Athletic. He signed his first professional contract with the club on 2 July 2025. He made his debut on the 13 August 2025 in the EFL Cup against Bolton Wanderers, starting the match before being replaced by Max Lowe on the 69 minute after picking up cramp - the game finished 3–3, with the young Owls side going on to win on peanlties. In September 2025, he made his first Championship squad against Queens Park Rangers, but remained an unused substitute. On 24 January 2026, Emery made his Championship debut, coming off the bench for Reece Johnson against Bristol City. Following the end of the 2025–26 season, the new ownership at Sheffield Wednesday exercised their one year option to keep him at the club until 2027. Ahead of the following season, he would sign a new one-year contract, with a club option for another year.

On 11 September 2026, Emery joined National League North club South Shields on a 28 day loan. His first match was a 0–6 defeat against Hereford the following day. During the loan, South Shields manager Mike Williamson described Emery as having "an elite level mentality" after helping the team with a 7–0 and 4–0 victory against Witton Albion and then Buxton. His loan spell was extended by a further 28 days following the end of his first month at the club.

== Career statistics ==
As of 21 November 2026

Club	Season	League			FA Cup		EFL Cup		Other		Total	
Club	Season	Division	Apps	Goals	Apps	Goals	Apps	Goals	Apps	Goals	Apps	Goals
Sheffield Wednesday	2025–26	Championship	3	0	1	0	3	0	0	0	7	0
Sheffield Wednesday	2026–27	League One	0	0	0	0	0	0	0	0	0	0
Sheffield Wednesday	Total		3	0	1	0	3	0	0	0	7	0
South Shields (loan)	2026–27	National League North	8	0	3	0	—		1 (Note: Appearance(s) in FA Trophy)	0	12	0
Career total			11	0	4	0	3	0	1	0	19	0
