= Raphael-Pijus Otegbayo =

English association football player (born 2006)

Personal information
- Full name: Raphael-Pijus Otegbayo
- Date of birth: 22 August 2007 (age 19)
- Place of birth: Cork, Republic of Ireland
- Position: Defender

Team information
- Current team: Stoke City
- Number: 54

Youth career
- 2015–2020: Ringmahon Rangers
- 2020–2023: Cobh Ramblers
- 2023–2024: Stockport County
- 2024–2026: Stoke City

Senior career*
Years	Team	Apps	(Gls)
2026–	Stoke City	3	(0)
- * Club domestic league appearances and goals as of 19:19, 25 April 2026 (UTC)

Raphael-Pijus Otegbayo (born 22 August 2007) is an Irish professional footballer who plays as a defender for EFL Championship club Stoke City.

== Club career ==
Otegbayo was born in Cork, Ireland, and played youth team football with his brother, Gabriel, at Ringmahon Rangers and Cobh Ramblers before moving to Manchester in 2021 and joining Stockport County. He joined the Stoke City under-18 squad in October 2024 after leaving Stockport County. He made his professional debut on 18 April 2026 in a EFL Championship match against Wrexham.

== International career ==
Otegbayo of Irish and Nigerian decent was called up to Republic of Ireland under-19 squad in October 2025.

== Personal life ==
Otegbayo's brother, Gabriel, is also a footballer and plays for Sheffield Wednesday.

== Career statistics ==
As of match played 25 April 2026

Appearances and goals by club, season and competition
Club	Season	League			FA Cup		EFL Cup		Other		Total	
Club	Season	Division	Apps	Goals	Apps	Goals	Apps	Goals	Apps	Goals	Apps	Goals
Stoke City	2025–26	Championship	3	0	0	0	0	0	—		3	0
Career total			3	0	0	0	0	0	0	0	3	0
