= Favour Onukwuli =

English footballer (born 2005)

Personal information
- Full name: Favour Onukwuli
- Date of birth: 9 April 2005 (age 21)
- Position: Left winger

Team information
- Current team: Cheltenham Town
- Number: 20

Youth career
- –2023: Volenti Academy
- 2023–2025: Sheffield Wednesday

Senior career*
Years	Team	Apps	(Gls)
2025–2026	Sheffield Wednesday	3	(0)
2026–	Cheltenham Town	1	(0)
- * Club domestic league appearances and goals as of 22:00, 10 November 2026 (UTC)

Favour Onukwuli (born 9 April 2005) is an English professional footballer who plays as a winger for EFL League Two club Cheltenham Town.

== Club career ==
=== Sheffield Wednesday ===
After a successful trial, Onukwuli signed his first professional contract with Sheffield Wednesday in January 2023. He extended his contract in the summer of 2025 after struggling with injuries the season before. He made his debut against Hull City on Boxing Day 2025, replacing Svante Ingelsson in a 2–2 draw. At the end of the 2025–26 season, it was confirmed that he would be leaving at the end of his contract.

=== Cheltenham Town ===
On 8 August 2026, Onukwuli signed for League Two club Cheltenham Town following a successful trial. He made his debut the same day, coming off the bench in a 1–3 defeat to Charlton Athletic in the EFL Cup.

== Career statistics ==
As of 10 November 2026

Club	Season	League			FA Cup		EFL Cup		Other		Total	
Club	Season	Division	Apps	Goals	Apps	Goals	Apps	Goals	Apps	Goals	Apps	Goals
Sheffield Wednesday	2025–26	Championship	3	0	0	0	0	0	—		3	0
Cheltenham Town	2026–27	League Two	1	0	0	0	1	0	1 (Note: Appearance(s) in EFL Trophy)	0	3	0
Career total			4	0	0	0	1	0	1	0	6	0
