= Rio Shipston =

English association football player

Personal information
- Full name: Rio Joel Shipston
- Date of birth: 7 November 2004 (age 21)
- Place of birth: Sheffield, England
- Height: 5 ft 9 in (1.74 m)
- Position: Centre midfielder

Team information
- Current team: Solihull Moors
- Number: 20

Youth career
- 2011–2023: Sheffield Wednesday

Senior career*
Years	Team	Apps	(Gls)
2023–2026	Sheffield Wednesday	7	(0)
2025	→ Cork City (loan)	20	(0)
2026–	Solihull Moors	7	(0)
- * Club domestic league appearances and goals as of 08:29, 17 October 2026 (UTC)

Rio Joel Shipston (born 7 November 2004) is an English professional footballer who plays as a centre midfielder for National League club Solihull Moors.

== Career ==
=== Sheffield Wednesday ===
Shipston joined Sheffield Wednesday at the age of 7, and would make his senior debut against Leicester City U21 on 18 October 2022 before signing his first pro contract on 14 December 2022. Manager Darren Moore would say "He's got wonderful size, good awareness, and he reads the play really well. He's developing his power, too." during his debut season about him. He made his first league appearance against Cambridge United on 2 January 2023, coming off the bench in a 5–0 win. Following injuries in the squad, he would join the first team for the remainder of the season along with fellow youngsters Adam Alimi-Adetoro and Sean Fusire who have all made their debut during the season.

On returning from his loan at Cork City, he signed a new contract with the club. He returned to the squad for the 2025–26 season and would start in their EFL Cup tie against Bolton Wanderers in a 3–3 draw. At the end of the 2025–26 season, it was confirmed that he would be leaving at the end of his contract.

==== Cork City (loan) ====
On 13 January 2025, Shipston joined Cork City on loan until the end of June. On 28 June 2025, Cork City announced that Shipston's loan spell with the club had come to an end, having made 21 appearances in all competitions during his loan spell.

=== Solihull Moors ===
On 7 July 2026, Shipston joined National League side Solihull Moors.

== Personal life ==
Born in England, Shipston is of Indian descent.

== Career statistics ==
As of 13 October 2026

Appearances and goals by club, season and competition
Club	Season	League			National Cup		League Cup		Other		Total	
Club	Season	Division	Apps	Goals	Apps	Goals	Apps	Goals	Apps	Goals	Apps	Goals
Sheffield Wednesday	2022–23	League One	3	0	0	0	0	0	1 (Note: Appearance(s) in EFL Trophy)	0	4	0
Sheffield Wednesday	2023–24	Championship	0	0	1	0	0	0	–		1	0
Sheffield Wednesday	2024–25	Championship	0	0	0	0	0	0	–		0	0
Sheffield Wednesday	2025–26	Championship	4	0	1	0	3	0	–		8	0
Sheffield Wednesday	Total		7	0	2	0	3	0	1	0	13	0
Cork City (loan)	2025	LOI Premier Division	20	0	–		–		1 (Note: Appearance in Munster Senior Cup)	0	21	0
Solihull Moors	2026–27	National League	7	0	0	0	–		3 (Note: Appearances in National League Cup)	0	10	0
Career total			34	0	2	0	3	0	5	0	44	0
