= Yisa Alao =

English footballer

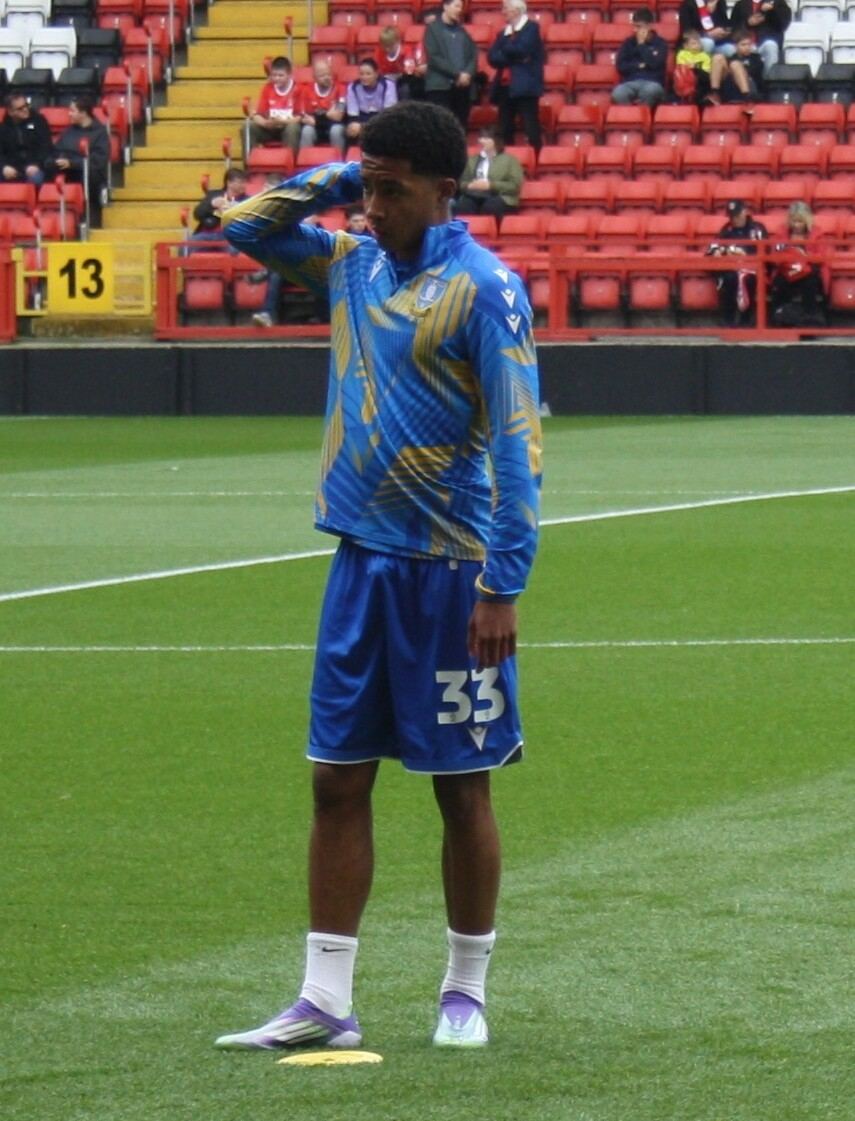
- Alao with Sheffield Wednesday in 2025

Personal information
- Full name: Yisa Marcus Alao
- Date of birth: 17 November 2008 (age 17)
- Place of birth: Doncaster, England
- Positions: Left-back; left wing-back

Team information
- Current team: Chelsea

Youth career
- –2025: Sheffield Wednesday

Senior career*
| Years | Team | Apps | (Gls) |
| 2025–2026 | Sheffield Wednesday | 2 | (0) |
| 2026– | Chelsea | 0 | (0) |

International career^{‡}
| 2026– | England U18 | 2 | (0) |
- * Club domestic league appearances and goals as of 17:03, 17 January 2026 (UTC) ‡ National team caps and goals as of 08:24, 1 June 2026 (UTC)

Yisa Marcus Alao (born 17 November 2008) is an English professional footballer who plays as a left-back for Premier League club Chelsea.

== Club career ==
=== Sheffield Wednesday ===
Alao joined Sheffield Wednesday in the Under-7s and worked his way up through the ranks, before starting his scholarship in May 2025. On 13 August 2025, he made his professional debut at 16 years of age, coming off the bench to replace Olaf Kobacki in the EFL Cup tie against Bolton Wanderers, where a young Wednesday side would draw the game 3–3 before going on to win at penalties. Alao made his first Championship match day squad for the game against Portsmouth on 20 September. He made his senior league debut in December against Derby County, replacing Harry Amass as a late substitute in a 0–3 defeat, the same day that there was reported Premier League interest in him. He started his first senior games in January 2026, first at home to Brentford in the FA Cup, followed by Portsmouth the following week in the Championship.

=== Chelsea ===
On 26 January 2026, Alao completed his move to Chelsea for an undislcosed fee, agreeing a contract until 2028.

== International career ==
In May 2026, Alao was selected for England under-18 and played in games against Cyprus and Greece.

== Personal life ==
Born in England, Alao is of Nigerian descent.

== Career statistics ==
As of 17 January 2026

Appearances and goals by club, season and competition
| Club | Season | League | | | FA Cup | | EFL Cup | | Other | | Total | |
| Club | Season | Division | Apps | Goals | Apps | Goals | Apps | Goals | Apps | Goals | Apps | Goals |
|---|---|---|---|---|---|---|---|---|---|---|---|---|
| Sheffield Wednesday | 2025–26 | Championship | 2 | 0 | 1 | 0 | 2 | 0 | 0 | 0 | 5 | 0 |
| Career total | | | 2 | 0 | 1 | 0 | 2 | 0 | 0 | 0 | 5 | 0 |

== Honours ==
Chelsea U18

- U18 Premier League – National Champions: 2025–26
- U18 Premier League – Southern Champions: 2025–26
