= Cole McGhee =

English footballer

Personal information
- Full name: Cole James McGhee
- Date of birth: 28 January 2006 (age 20)
- Place of birth: Coventry, England
- Height: 6 ft 0 in (1.83 m)
- Position: Centre back

Team information
- Current team: Torquay United (on loan from Sheffield Wednesday)
- Number: 26

Youth career
- –2022: Coventry City
- 2022–2024: Preston North End

Senior career*
| Years | Team | Apps | (Gls) |
| 2024–2025 | Preston North End | 0 | (0) |
| 2025 | → Chorley (loan) | 3 | (0) |
| 2025– | Sheffield Wednesday | 10 | (0) |
| 2026– | → Torquay United (loan) | 0 | (0) |
- * Club domestic league appearances and goals as of 20:59, 11 November 2026 (UTC)

Cole James McGhee (born 28 January 2006) is an English professional footballer who plays as a defender for National League South club Torquay United on loan from EFL League One side Sheffield Wednesday.

== Club career ==
=== Early career ===
McGhee joined Preston North End from Coventry City to start his scholarship in May 2022. In the final year of his scholarship he joined National League North club Chorley on a work experience loan. He was released by Preston North End at the end of his contract in June 2025.

=== Sheffield Wednesday ===
On 2 July 2025 he joined Sheffield Wednesday on a free transfer. He made his senior debut in the second round of the EFL Cup, starting against Leeds United where they went onto win on penalties. On 29 December 2025, McGhee was originally named on the bench against Blackburn Rovers, before Liam Cooper pulled out during the warm-up, meaning McGhee would step into the starting lineup to make his Championship debut. Following the end of the 2025–26 season, the new ownership at Sheffield Wednesday exercised their one year option to keep him at the club until 2027.

The following season, he picked up a shoulder injury in the final pre-season game against Accrington Stanley which would require surgery rulling him for the first few months of the season. On 20 November he joined National League South club Torquay United on loan until January.

== Career statistics ==
As of 11 November 2026

Appearances and goals by club, season and competition
| Club | Season | League | | | FA Cup | | EFL Cup | | Other | | Total | |
| Club | Season | Division | Apps | Goals | Apps | Goals | Apps | Goals | Apps | Goals | Apps | Goals |
|---|---|---|---|---|---|---|---|---|---|---|---|---|
| Preston North End | 2024–25 | Championship | 0 | 0 | 0 | 0 | 0 | 0 | 0 | 0 | 0 | 0 |
| Chorley (loan) | 2024–25 | National League North | 3 | 0 | 0 | 0 | 0 | 0 | 0 | 0 | 3 | 0 |
| Sheffield Wednesday | 2025–26 | Championship | 10 | 0 | 1 | 0 | 2 | 0 | 0 | 0 | 13 | 0 |
| Sheffield Wednesday | 2026–27 | League One | 0 | 0 | 0 | 0 | 0 | 0 | 1 (Note: Appearance(s) in EFL Trophy) | 0 | 1 | 0 |
| Sheffield Wednesday | Total | | 10 | 0 | 1 | 0 | 2 | 0 | 1 | 0 | 14 | 0 |
| Torquay United (loan) | 2026–27 | National League South | 0 | 0 | 0 | 0 | 0 | 0 | 0 | 0 | 0 | 0 |
| Career total | | | 13 | 0 | 1 | 0 | 2 | 0 | 1 | 0 | 17 | 0 |
