= Mackenzie Maltby =

English footballer

Personal information
- Full name: Mackenzie James Maltby
- Date of birth: 4 December 2004 (age 21)
- Place of birth: Chesterfield, England
- Height: 6 ft 2 in (1.88 m)
- Position: Centre back

Team information
- Current team: Halifax Town
- Number: 6

Youth career
- Green Hill
- –2024: Sheffield Wednesday

Senior career*
Years	Team	Apps	(Gls)
2024–2026	Sheffield Wednesday	2	(0)
2024–2025	→ Scarborough Athletic (loan)	23	(2)
2026–	Halifax Town	1	(0)
- * Club domestic league appearances and goals as of 22:10, 3 November 2026 (UTC)

Mackenzie James Maltby (born 4 December 2004) is an English professional footballer who plays as a defender for National League club Halifax Town.

== Club career ==
=== Sheffield Wednesday ===
Having joined Sheffield Wednesday at the age of 7, Maltby raised through the ranks, including being the U18s captain, and signed his first professional contract in July 2023. In July 2024, he signed a new contract with the club. Ahead of the 2025–26 season, he picked up an injury and had to undergo surgery. On 25 April 2026, he made his Wednesday debut, replacing Sean Fusire at half time against Oxford United. At the end of the 2025–26 season it was confirmed that he would be invited back to pre-season training with a view to potentially extending his stay at S6.

==== Scarborough Athletic (loan) ====
In August 2024, Maltby joined National League North club Scarborough Athletic on a one month loan, which was later extended until the 26 December. Having picked up a hamstring injury towards the end of his spell, once recovered in February he returned to Scarborough Athletic on loan for the remainder of the season. He finished the season winning the clubs young player of the year award.

=== Halifax Town ===
On 13 June 2026, Maltby signed for Halifax Town coming into effect on 1 July 2026.

== Career statistics ==
As of 3 November 2026

Club	Season	League			FA Cup		EFL Cup		Other		Total	
Club	Season	Division	Apps	Goals	Apps	Goals	Apps	Goals	Apps	Goals	Apps	Goals
Sheffield Wednesday	2025–26	Championship	2	0	0	0	0	0	—		2	0
Scarborough Athletic (loan)	2024–25	National League North	23	2	1	0	—		—		24	2
Halifax Town	2026–27	National League	1	0	0	0	—		2 (Note: Appearances in National League Cup)	0	3	0
Career total			26	2	1	0	0	0	2	0	29	2
