= Guilherme Siqueira (footballer, born 2004) =

Brazilian association football player

Gui Siqueira
Personal information
- Full name: Guilherme Leal Siqueira
- Date of birth: 6 December 2004 (age 21)
- Place of birth: Italy
- Height: 5 ft 11 in (1.80 m)
- Position: Right back

Team information
- Current team: Buxton
- Number: 23

Youth career
- –2016: Brentford
- 2016–2023: Queens Park Rangers

Senior career*
Years	Team	Apps	(Gls)
2023–2026	Sheffield Wednesday	0	(0)
2026–	Buxton	8	(0)
- * Club domestic league appearances and goals as of 16:28, 10 October 2026 (UTC)

Guilherme "Gui" Leal Siqueira (born 6 December 2004) is a Brazilian professional footballer who plays as a right back for National League North club Buxton.

== Early and personal life ==
Possessing dual-citizenship of Brazil and Italy, Siqueira moved to the United Kingdom in childhood. He played in the Brentford academy until he was 12 years-old. After which, he joined the system at Queens Park Rangers, where he completed a two-year football scholarship.

== Career ==
He signed his first professional contract with Sheffield Wednesday in July 2023, following a trial with the club. He began to be integrated with the Wednesday first-team match day squad during the 2023–24 season. He made his professional debut with Sheffield Wednesday as a substitute in a 4–0 FA Cup win over Cardiff City on 6 January 2024. He returned to the first team squad for the 2025–26 season and started in their EFL Cup tie against Bolton Wanderers scoring the opening goal – and his first goal for the club – a ferocious long-range strike, before being replaced at half time for Liam Palmer. His goal won the EFL Cup Round 1, Goal of the Round. After playing one more game that season, the EFL Cup second round win against Leeds United, he was ruled out for the remainder of the season having undergone surgery following an injury to his achilles during an U21 win against Colchester United. At the end of the 2025–26 season it was confirmed that he would be invited back to pre-season training with a view to potentially extending his stay at S6.

On 21 August 2026, he joined National League North club Buxton.

== Career statistics ==
As of 10 October 2026

Appearances and goals by club, season and competition
Club	Season	League			FA Cup		League Cup		Other		Total	
Club	Season	Division	Apps	Goals	Apps	Goals	Apps	Goals	Apps	Goals	Apps	Goals
Sheffield Wednesday	2023–24	Championship	0	0	3	0	0	0	–		3	0
Sheffield Wednesday	2024–25	Championship	0	0	0	0	0	0	–		0	0
Sheffield Wednesday	2025–26	Championship	0	0	0	0	2	1	–		2	1
Sheffield Wednesday	Total		0	0	3	0	2	1	0	0	5	1
Buxton	2026–27	National League North	8	0	2	0	—		—		10	0
Career total			8	0	5	0	2	1	0	0	15	1
