= Reece Johnson =

English footballer

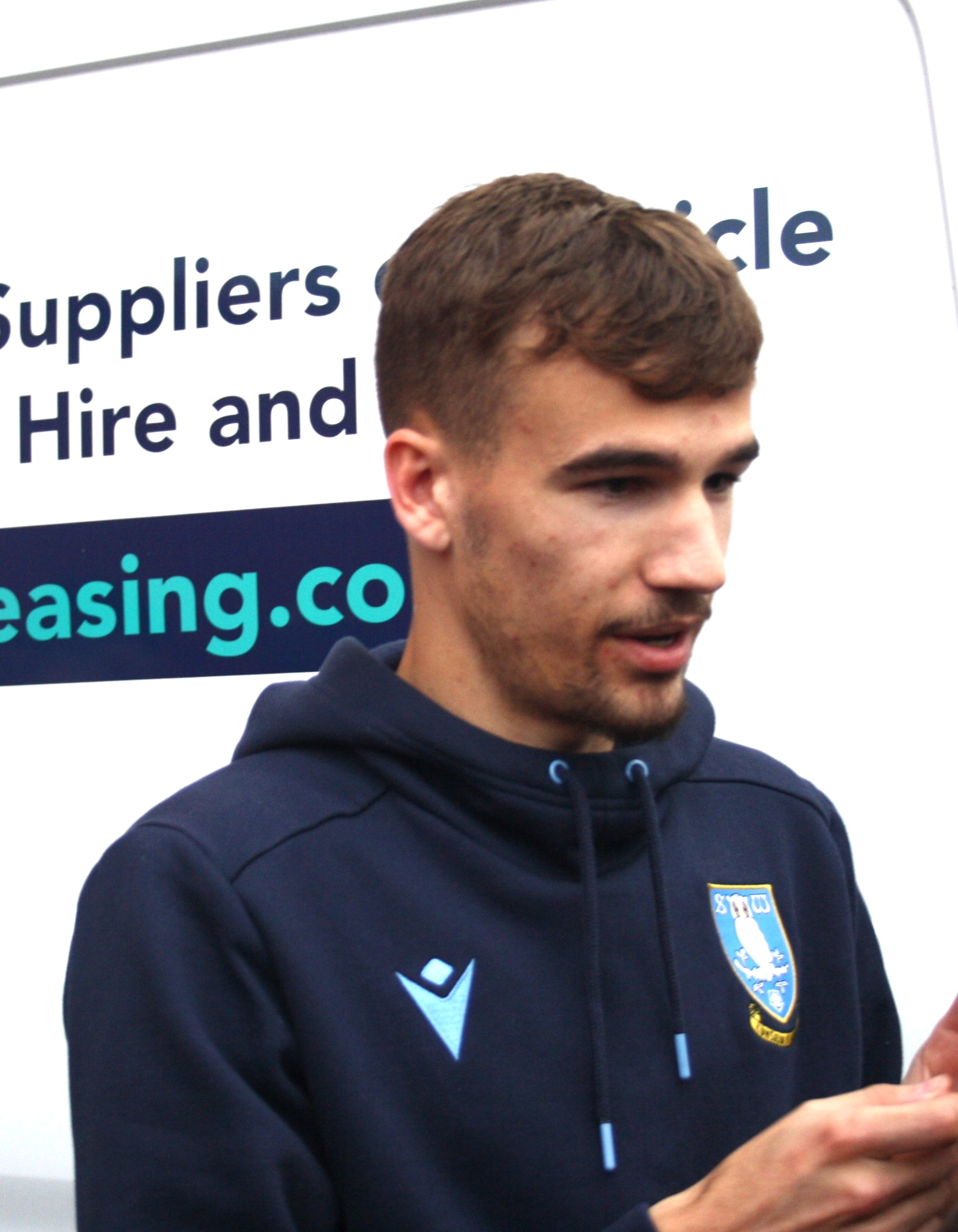
- Johnson with Sheffield Wednesday in 2025.

Personal information
- Full name: Reece Harry Johnson
- Date of birth: 3 July 2006 (age 20)
- Height: 6 ft 0 in (1.82 m)
- Position: Left back

Team information
- Current team: Eastleigh (on loan from Sheffield Wednesday)
- Number: 27

Youth career
- –2025: Sheffield Wednesday

Senior career*
Years	Team	Apps	(Gls)
2025–	Sheffield Wednesday	12	(0)
2026–	→ Eastleigh (loan)	15	(1)
- * Club domestic league appearances and goals as of 14:33, 21 November 2026 (UTC)

Reece Harry Johnson (born 3 July 2006) is an English professional footballer who plays as a defender for National League club Eastleigh on loan from EFL League One side Sheffield Wednesday.

== Club career ==
=== Sheffield Wednesday ===
He signed his first professional contract with the Sheffield Wednesday on 3 July 2024. After a summer of turmoil, he joined the first team ahead of the 2025–26 season. On the 13 August 2025, he made his professional debut in the EFL Cup against Bolton Wanderers, playing the full 90 minutes as well as scoring Wednesday's third goal in a 3–3 draw, where the young side would go onto winning on penalties. Three days later, he made his senior league debut, replacing Liam Palmer on the 85th minute against Stoke City. At the start of September, manager Henrik Pedersen moved Johnson, alongside teammates Ernie Weaver, Jarvis Thornton and goalkeeper Logan Stretch into the first team dressing room. However, in the next game against Grimsby Town he would pick up a foot injury which required stitches, meaning he would be out for two-to-three weeks. On 20 January 2026, he made his first league start, playing the full 90 minutes against Birmingham City. Following the end of the 2025–26 season, the club confirmed that they had offered him a new contract.

On 29 July 2026, Johnson signed a new one-year contract at Sheffield Wednesday, with a further one-year option, before immediately joining Eastleigh on a season-long loan for the 2026–27 season. He made his debut against Kidderminster Harriers on 15 August, playing the 90 minutes.

== Career statistics ==
As of 21 November 2026

Appearances and goals by club, season and competition
Club	Season	League			FA Cup		EFL Cup		Other		Total	
Club	Season	Division	Apps	Goals	Apps	Goals	Apps	Goals	Apps	Goals	Apps	Goals
Sheffield Wednesday	2025–26	Championship	12	0	1	0	3	1	—		16	1
Sheffield Wednesday	2026–27	League One	0	0	0	0	0	0	—		0	0
Sheffield Wednesday	Total		12	0	1	0	3	1	0	0	16	1
Eastleigh (loan)	2026–27	National League	15	1	1	0	—		—		16	1
Career total			27	1	2	0	3	1	0	0	32	2
