= George Brown (footballer, born 2006) =

English footballer

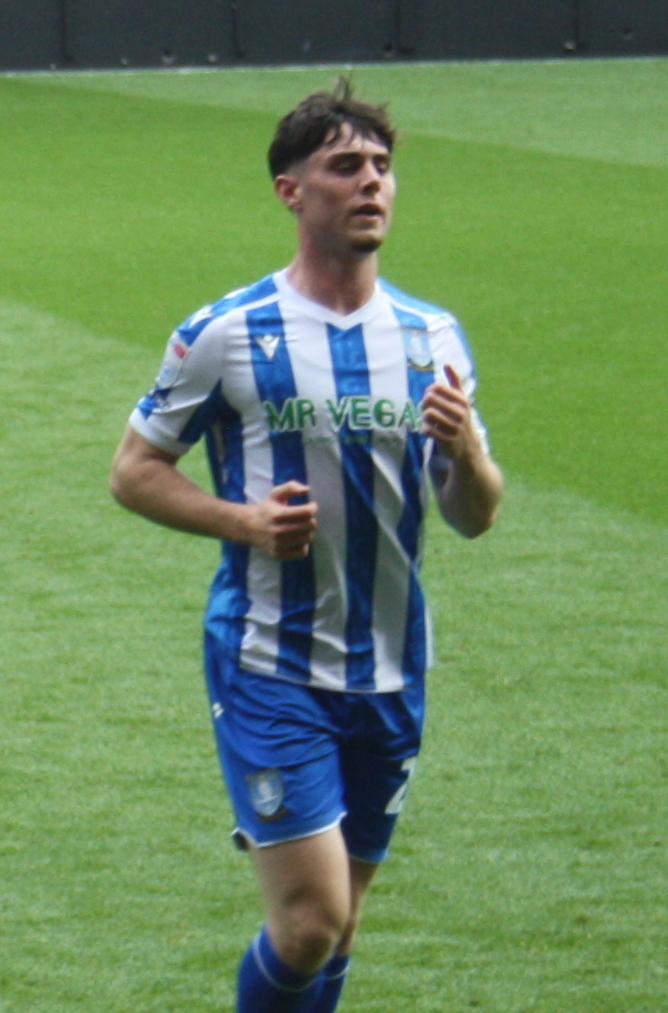
- Brown playing for Sheffield Wednesday in 2025

Personal information
- Full name: George William Brown
- Date of birth: 28 May 2006 (age 20)
- Place of birth: Yorkshire, England
- Position: Centre-forward

Team information
- Current team: Sheffield Wednesday
- Number: 29

Youth career
- 2013–2024: Horsforth St. Margaret's FC
- 2021–2024: Leeds UFCA
- 2024–2025: Sheffield Wednesday

Senior career*
Years	Team	Apps	(Gls)
2025–	Sheffield Wednesday	7	(2)
- * Club domestic league appearances and goals as of 21:00, 11 November 2026 (UTC)

George William Brown (born 28 May 2006) is an English professional footballer who plays as a forward for EFL League One side Sheffield Wednesday.

== Club career ==
=== Early career ===
George began his footballing career at Horsforth St. Margaret’s Football Club. He played there from the Under-7 level through to age 16, while also training at the local academy. Brown joined Leeds UFCA as a 13 year old and raised through the ranks, where he would net 47 goals in 26 appearances for UFCA Senior in the Yorkshire Amateur League Supreme Division - as well as helping the side to League Cup and County Cup victories. He would have trials at Grimsby Town in 2022.

=== Sheffield Wednesday ===
After a successful trial, where he played 6 times for Sheffield Wednesday's academy, he would sign his first professional contract with the club in September 2024. He made 27 league appearances for the Owls Under-21s in his first season scoring eight goals in all competitions during his maiden campaign. In July 2025, he would extend his stay signing a new contract at the club.

He made the senior squad for the first time in the first home game of the 2025–2026 season against Stoke City, where he was named on the bench. He made his senior debut in the second round of the EFL Cup, starting against Leeds United, before being replaced by fellow debutant Will Grainger, where Wednesday went onto win on penalties. He made his Championship debut on 20 September 2025, starting the match away to Portsmouth, where he also scored his first senior goal, the second goal in a 2–0 win. The following month, Brown suffered an ankle injury in training and would be out for six-to-eight weeks. He returned from injury in December against Derby County. However he would pick up another hamstring injury in the next game against Ipswich Town which would see him have a further setback in April keeping him out for the remainder of the season. Following the end of the 2025–26 season, the new ownership at Sheffield Wednesday exercised their one year option to keep him at the club until 2027.

After almost eleven months sidelined through injury, he would start in an EFL Trophy game against Accrington Stanley which finished in a 0–4 defeat in November 2026, where he played the opening 45 minutes.

== Career statistics ==
As of 11 November 2026

Club	Season	League			FA Cup		EFL Cup		Other		Total	
Club	Season	Division	Apps	Goals	Apps	Goals	Apps	Goals	Apps	Goals	Apps	Goals
Sheffield Wednesday	2025–26	Championship	7	2	0	0	2	0	0	0	9	2
Sheffield Wednesday	2026–27	League One	0	0	0	0	0	0	1 (Note: Appearance(s) in EFL Trophy)	0	1	0
Career total			7	2	0	0	2	0	1	0	10	2
