= 2025–26 Sheffield Wednesday F.C. season =

English football club season

Sheffield Wednesday
2025–26 season
- Owner: Dejphon Chansiri (until 24 October); Arise Capital Partners LLC (from 2 May)
- Manager: Henrik Pedersen
- Stadium: Hillsborough Stadium
- Championship: 24th (relegated)
- FA Cup: Third round (vs Brentford)
- EFL Cup: Third round (vs Grimsby Town)
- Top goalscorer: League: Jamal Lowe; Charlie McNeill; Jerry Yates (4 each); All: Jamal Lowe (5)
- Highest home attendance: 33,750 vs West Bromwich Albion, 2 May 2026, Championship
- Lowest home attendance: 7,081 vs Middlesbrough, 22 October 2025, Championship
- Average home league attendance: 23,199
- Biggest win: 2–0 vs Portsmouth (A), 20 September 2025, Championship
- Biggest defeat: 0–5 vs Coventry City (H), 4 October 2025, Championship
| Home colours | Away colours | Third colours |

The 2025–26 season was the 158th season in the existence of Sheffield Wednesday, and the club's third consecutive season in the Championship. In addition to the domestic league, the club also competed in the FA Cup and the EFL Cup.

Wednesday endured a disastrous season, primarily due to financial woes brought about by the mismanagement of owner Dejphon Chansiri. The club entered administration in October and was deducted 12 points as punishment. They were deducted a further 6 points in December for additional late payments, bringing their total penalty to −18 points.

Wednesday's performance on the pitch was likewise unprecedentedly poor. They finished the regular season with two wins, a record low in Championship history. Combined with the 18-point penalty, Wednesday finished with 0 points, the lowest points total in the history of English football.

== Season overview ==
=== June ===
On 3 June, the club and owner Dejphon Chansiri were charged with multiple breaches of EFL Regulations relating to payment obligations by the EFL.

On 4 June, local MP Clive Betts called on Chansiri to sell the club.

On 5 June, the club were placed under a registration embargo.

On 16 June, Sheffield-born businessman Adam Shaw, said he had had two bids for the club rejected worth up to US$75m.

On 17 June, former owner Milan Mandarić says he would attempt to buy back the club.

On 18 June, the EFL placed the club under a three-window fee restriction ban after exceeding 30 days of late payments, with the club confirming they would be appealing.

On 23 June, American businessman John Textor was linked with buying the club.

On 25 June, Milan Mandarić released a statement saying he was no longer pursuing a return to the club.

On 26 June, Chansiri confirmed he was willing to sell the club and looking for investment from new parties.

On 27 June, the club were placed under a further embargo by the EFL, over amounts owed to HM Revenue and Customs.

On 30 June, it was revealed that players and staff hadn't been paid for the second month in a row and for the third time in four months.

=== July ===
On 1 July, several players handed in their 15-day notice, following the June wages being delayed.

On 2 July, Maheta Molango of the PFA called the situation at the club "shocking" and "not tolerable."

On 3 July, the club were placed in a triple embargo due to money Wednesday owed to Southampton and Norwich City for fees towards players Shea Charles and Akin Famewo.

On 11 July, American businessman Tilman Fertitta was linked with buying the club.

On 14 July, it was revealed money was still owed to Hull City for the transfer of Mallik Wilks.

On 15 July, Wednesday confirmed their new home strip for the 2025–26 season as well as Mr Vegas as their new front of shirt sponsor for the 2025–26 season.

On 29 July, Sheffield City Council issued a prohibition notice, reducing the North Stand's capacity to 0.

On 30 July, it was revealed that players hadn't been paid for the third month in a row and for the fourth time in five months.

=== August ===
On 1 August, the EFL said they were increasingly concerned about the future of Sheffield Wednesday and their ability to fulfil their Championship fixtures this season.

On 5 August, Wednesday confirmed their new away strip for the 2025–26 season.

On 6 August, the EFL issued a statement, saying they were deeply concerned and frustrated by the ongoing and developing challenges at the club, with the current owner needing to either fund the club meeting its obligations or make good on his commitment to sell to a well-funded party, for fair market value – ending the current uncertainty and impasse. They also confirmed that proceedings against the Club and Chansiri, announced in June, remain ongoing, however because they have now surpassed 30 days of late payments for the year beginning 1 July 2025 the fee restriction ban has been extended to the end of the winter transfer window in the 2026–27 Season, as well as well as being placed under a further embargo for non-payment of players.

On 7 August, Wednesday confirmed their season squad numbers.

On 8 August, had their transfer embargos lifted after paying outstanding debts for players and transfer fees, but remained under a transfer-fee ban and are still bound by a business plan set out by the Club Financial Reporting Unit.

On 10 August, Wednesday confirmed their new third strip for the 2025–26 season.

On 13 August, Sheffield City Council lifted the Prohibition Notice previously in place for the North Stand meaning the stand would be open for their first home game of the season.

On 15 August, it was reported that unless Chansiri could give the EFL assurances that players and staff can be paid, they will not be able to sign anyone despite not being under any registration embargo.

On 28 August, staff and players were told they were expected to be paid on time, the first time since April.

=== September ===
On 4 September, the Wednesday fans protested Chansiri outside the Thai embassy in London.

On 17 September, Wednesday were placed under two more embargoes for future financial information and secure funding linked to an inability to prove that the club can be funded going forward.

On 25 September, the club were placed under a further embargo by the EFL, over amounts owed to HM Revenue and Customs again.

On 26 September, the club were placed under a further two embargoes, so five in total, this time for football creditors and amounts due to another club.

On 29 September, senior players and staff were told not to expect wages on payday, the fifth time that calendar year.

=== October ===
On 4 October, the match against Coventry City was delayed due to a fan protest on the pitch against the owner.

On 6 October, the club were hit with their sixth embargo after failure to pay players on time.

On 9 October, new chair of the Independent Football Regulator, David Kogan said Sheffield Wednesday's struggles are a "significant problem" and the new football regulator is seeking powers to investigate clubs in such situations. Unite the Union also issued a statement against Chansiri, for his continuous failure to pay non-football staff.

On 14 October, it was confirmed that the players and non-playing staff received the rest of their September wages removing one of their six embargoes.

On 16 October, it was reported that HMRC are close to issuing a winding-up order due to an unpaid tax bill of around £1m.

On 19 October, long-term physio Antonio Quintela left the club in October to join Premier League side Nottingham Forest.

On 22 October, the fans boycotted the fixture against Middlesbrough.

On 24 October, Julian Pitts, Kris Wigfield and Paul Stanley of Begbies Traynor were appointed joint administrators of Sheffield Wednesday Football Club Limited and of Sheffield 3 Limited, the company that owns Hillsborough stadium. On entering administration, the club were given a 12-point deduction by the EFL.

On 28 October, American billionaire John McEvoy was linked with buying the club.

On 30 October, players and staff were paid a day early, following huge fan backing after administration.

=== November ===
On 1 November, former Newcastle United owner Mike Ashley was linked with buying the club.

On 8 November, Staysure founder Ryan Howsam was linked with buying the club.

On 12 November, Wednesday paid their outstanding transfer fee debts meaning their number of embargoes was down to four.

On 21 November, the Sheffield Wednesday Supporters Trust became the short sponsors for the rest of the season.

On 25 November, the owners of Sheffield United, COH Sports, were rumoured to be among 80 parties looking at buying the club, with potentially merging both clubs.

On 26 November, it was reported Mike Ashley had bid £20m for the club.

On 28 November, FC Midtjylland owner Anders Holch Povlsen was linked with buying the club, whilst Simon Jordan had been interested but wouldn't be going forward with an offer.

=== December ===
On 1 December, Sheffield Wednesday were deducted a further six points with immediate effect for multiple breaches of EFL regulations relating to payment obligations, with the club's former owner, Chansiri, prohibited from being an owner or director of any EFL club for a period of three years. They also confirmed that they were not seeking any further point penalties and remained in discussions over their transfer fee restrictions.

On 3 December, Ryan Howsam confirmed he was interested alongside Simon Jordan, and they were both out of the running in buying the club.

On 5 December, it was reported John McEvoy and the Storch family had joined forces in their attempt to purchase the club.

On 6 December, the match against Blackburn Rovers was abandoned on the 60th minute due to a waterlogged pitch.

On 14 December, it was reported that James Bord, alongside John Colquhoun and other individuals from Europe and either side of the Atlantic were interested in buying the club, and were among the final three parties, with Mike Ashley and the joint McEvoy/Storch being the other two parties still in contention.

On 19 December, Joel Akpobi signed a two-year scholarship following a successful trial.

On 24 December, David Storch confirmed he'd made an offer the previous week, but was partnering with Tom Costin of Owl Ventures. Later that day, the administrators confirmed that they intended to grant preferred bidder status to a consortium following the conclusion of the initial bidding process, which was believed to be the James Bord bid.

=== January ===
On 6 January, three individuals of the preferred consortium were announced as James Bord, Felix Roemer and Alsharif Faisal Bin Jamil.

On 30 January, Liam Palmer was appointed the new club captain following the sale of Barry Bannan.

=== February ===
On 22 February, they were relegated to League One following the 1–2 defeat in the Steel City derby against Sheffield United, breaking the record for earliest ever relegation in the English Football League.

On 24 February, it was reported that head of recruitment, Kevin Beadell, would be leaving the club at the end of the month with the preferred bidders, taking on responsibility once their offer was ratified.

On 25 February, the consortium led by James Bord, Felix Romer and Abdullah Faisal Bin Jamil withdrew their bid of £47.8m to buy the club.

=== March ===
On 1 March, it was confirmed by manager Henrik Pedersen that head of recruitment Kevin Beadell would now be staying following the James Bord consortium pulling out of a deal to buy the club.

On 3 March, it was reported that Charlie Methven was interested in purchasing the club.

On 10 March, it was reported there were three offers to buy the club, with David Storch the leading contender, with the other offers from Mike Ashley and Charlie Methven. That evening it was confirmed that Arise Capital Partners, which consists of David Storch, Michael Storch and Tom Costin, had become the new preferred bidder for the Club.

On 18 March, Sean Fusire pulled out of the Zimbabwe squad for the Four Nations Football Tournament due to personal reasons.

=== April ===
On 15 April, the EFL informed the preferred bidders that Wednesday will start next season on –15 points.

=== May ===
On 2 May, it was confirmed that Arise Capital Partners LLC had become the new owners of Sheffield Wednesday, and that they would start the following season without any points deduction. After the news, Wednesday beat West Bromwich Albion on the final day of the season, marking their first home win, and second win overall, to finish the season on zero points.

On 8 May, it was confirmed that Tim Bacich and John Ross had invested more than 10% alongside David Storch into Steel City Sports Fund, which is a subsidiary of SWFC Sports Holdings, the company who purchased the club.

On 16 May, the club issued their retained list following the end-of-the-season.

On 18 May, the club confirmed the appointment of David Bruce as their new Chief Executive Officer.

On 19 May, Wednesday announced their new first year scholars of; Olly Bramhall, Roman Cawley, Jamie Darley, Louis Hutchinson, Dennis Kohn, Harrison Langford, Charlie Liddell, Benji Sedgwick, Logan Scott and Oscar Wildman.

== First-team squad ==
As of 16 May 2026

| No. | Player | Position | Nationality | Place of birth | Date of birth (age) | Signed from | Date signed | Fee | Contract end |
Goalkeepers
| 1 | Pierce Charles | GK | (Northern Ireland) | Manchester | 21 July 2005 (age 21) | Manchester City | 14 October 2022 | Free transfer | 30 June 2027 |
| 13 | Murphy Cooper | GK | (England) | Reading | 27 December 2001 (age 24) | Queens Park Rangers | 16 January 2026 | Loan | 31 May 2026 |
| 25 | Logan Stretch | GK | (Wales) | | 4 November 2006 (age 20) | Liverpool | 2 July 2025 | Free transfer | 30 June 2027 |
| 35 | Jack Phillips | GK | (England) | | 15 October 2005 (age 21) | Southampton | 3 July 2024 | Free transfer | 30 June 2026 |
Defenders
| 2 | Liam Palmer | RB | (Scotland) | Worksop | 19 September 1991 (age 35) | Academy | 1 July 2010 | —N/a | 30 June 2027 |
| 3 | Max Lowe | LB | (England) | South Normanton | 11 May 1997 (age 29) | Sheffield United | 1 July 2024 | Free transfer | 30 June 2026 |
| 5 | Di'Shon Bernard | CB | (Jamaica) | Wandsworth | 14 October 2000 (age 26) | Manchester United | 31 July 2023 | Free transfer | 30 June 2027 |
| 6 | Dominic Iorfa | CB | (England) | Southend-on-Sea | 24 June 1995 (age 31) | Wolverhampton Wanderers | 31 January 2019 | Undisclosed | 30 June 2026 |
| 16 | Liam Cooper | CB | (Scotland) | Kingston upon Hull | 30 August 1991 (age 35) | CSKA Sofia | 17 November 2025 | Free transfer | 30 June 2026 |
| 22 | Gabriel Otegbayo | CB | (Republic of Ireland) | Cork | 11 February 2005 (age 21) | Burnley | 1 March 2024 | Free transfer | 30 June 2027 |
| 23 | Gui Siqueira | RB | (Brazil) | | 6 December 2004 (age 21) | Queens Park Rangers | 19 July 2023 | Free transfer | 30 June 2026 |
| 27 | Reece Johnson | LB | (England) | | 3 July 2006 (age 20) | Academy | 3 July 2024 | —N/a | 30 June 2026 |
| 28 | Cole McGhee | CB | (England) | Coventry | 28 January 2006 (age 20) | Preston North End | 2 July 2025 | Free transfer | 30 June 2027 |
| 30 | Ernie Weaver | CB | (England) | Sheffield | 8 September 2006 (age 20) | Academy | 2 July 2025 | —N/a | 30 June 2027 |
| 32 | Joe Emery | CB | (England) | | 18 April 2007 (age 19) | Charlton Athletic | 2 July 2025 | Free transfer | 30 June 2027 |
| 44 | Mackenzie Maltby | CB | (England) | Chesterfield | 4 December 2004 (age 21) | Academy | 1 July 2023 | —N/a | 30 June 2026 |
| 45 | Tayo Adaramola | LB | (Republic of Ireland) | Dublin | 14 November 2003 (age 22) | Crystal Palace | 1 February 2026 | Loan | 31 May 2026 |
Midfielders
| 4 | Sean Fusire | CM | (Zimbabwe) | Sheffield | 31 May 2005 (age 21) | Academy | 9 December 2022 | —N/a | 30 June 2027 |
| 8 | Svante Ingelsson | CM | (Sweden) | Kalmar | 14 June 1998 (age 28) | Hansa Rostock | 1 July 2024 | Free transfer | 30 June 2027 |
| 14 | Nathaniel Chalobah | DM | (England) | Freetown | 12 December 1994 (age 31) | West Bromwich Albion | 13 July 2024 | Free transfer | 30 June 2026 |
| 18 | Marvelous Nakamba | DM | (Zimbabwe) | Hwange | 19 January 1994 (age 32) | Luton Town | 2 February 2026 | Free transfer | 30 June 2026 |
| 20 | Rio Shipston | CM | (England) | Sheffield | 7 November 2004 (age 22) | Academy | 14 December 2022 | —N/a | 30 June 2026 |
| 24 | Jaden Heskey | CM | (England) | Manchester | 17 December 2005 (age 20) | Manchester City | 16 January 2026 | Loan | 31 May 2026 |
| 36 | Bruno Fernandes | CM | (Portugal) | | 9 January 2006 (age 20) | Academy | 3 July 2024 | —N/a | 30 June 2026 |
| 37 | Jarvis Thornton | CM | (England) | Barnsley | 10 January 2006 (age 20) | Academy | 3 July 2024 | —N/a | 30 June 2026 |
| 42 | James Kay | CM | (England) | | 6 November 2008 (age 18) | Academy | —N/a | —N/a | —N/a |
Forwards
| 9 | Jamal Lowe | RW | (Jamaica) | Harrow | 21 July 1994 (age 32) | Bournemouth | 1 July 2024 | Free transfer | 30 June 2027 |
| 11 | Iké Ugbo | CF | (Canada) | Lewisham | 21 September 1998 (age 28) | Troyes | 8 August 2024 | Undisclosed | 30 June 2028 |
| 12 | Jerry Yates | CF | (England) | Doncaster | 10 November 1996 (age 30) | Luton Town | 30 January 2026 | Loan | 31 May 2026 |
| 17 | Charlie McNeill | CF | (England) | Droylsden | 9 September 2003 (age 23) | Manchester United | 10 July 2024 | Free transfer | 30 June 2027 |
| 19 | Olaf Kobacki | LW | (Poland) | Poznań | 10 July 2001 (age 25) | Arka Gdynia | 3 July 2024 | Undisclosed | 30 June 2028 |
| 21 | Joel Ndala | LW | (England) | Manchester | 31 May 2006 (age 20) | Manchester City | 2 February 2026 | Loan | 31 May 2026 |
| 29 | George Brown | CF | (England) | | 28 May 2006 (age 20) | Leeds UFCA | 6 September 2024 | Free transfer | 30 June 2027 |
| 31 | Will Grainger | CF | (Wales) | | 20 November 2008 (age 17) | Academy | —N/a | —N/a | —N/a |
| 39 | Junior Kamwa | RW | (England) | Leeds | 9 December 2005 (age 20) | Bradford City | 29 November 2024 | Free transfer | 30 June 2026 |
| 40 | Devlan Moses | CF | (Northern Ireland) | Huddersfield | 26 September 2005 (age 21) | Academy | 3 July 2024 | —N/a | 30 June 2026 |
| 41 | Favour Onukwuli | LW | (England) | | 9 April 2005 (age 21) | Volenti Academy | 30 January 2023 | Free transfer | 30 June 2026 |
| 43 | Zain Silcott-Duberry | LW | (England) | Hackney | 9 July 2005 (age 21) | Olympiacos B | 26 February 2026 | Free transfer | 30 June 2026 |
Out on loan
| 7 | Yan Valery | RB | (Tunisia) | Champigny-sur-Marne | 22 February 1999 (age 27) | Angers | 21 June 2024 | Undisclosed | 30 June 2027 |
| 26 | Harry Evers | LB | (England) | Manchester | 3 November 2006 (age 20) | Liverpool | 2 July 2025 | Free transfer | 30 June 2026 |

=== International call-ups ===
| No. | Player | Team | Competition | Opposition | Date | Ref. |
|---|---|---|---|---|---|---|
| — | (Canada) Aodhan Sopala | Canada U18 | Friendly | (Canada) Finland U19, Switzerland U19 | 5 & 7 September 2025 | |
| 31 | (Wales) Will Grainger | Wales U18 | Friendly | Japan U18, Australia U18 | 11 & 13 September 2025 | |
| 4 | (Zimbabwe) Sean Fusire | Zimbabwe | 2026 FIFA World Cup qualification | Benin, Rwanda | 5 & 9 September 2025 | |
| 18 | (Jamaica) Bailey Cadamarteri | Jamaica | 2026 FIFA World Cup qualification | Bermuda, Trinidad and Tobago | 6 & 10 September 2025 | |
| 7 | (Tunisia) Yan Valery | Tunisia | 2026 FIFA World Cup qualification | Liberia, Equatorial Guinea | 4 & 8 September 2025 | |
| 31 | (Wales) Will Grainger | Wales U18 | Friendly | Sweden U18, Ukraine U18, Croatia U18 | 9, 11 & 13 October 2025 | |
| 25 | (Wales) Logan Stretch | Wales U19 | Friendly | Scotland U19, Netherlands U19, England U19 | 8, 11 & 14 October 2025 | |
| 7 | (Tunisia) Yan Valery | Tunisia | 2026 FIFA World Cup qualification | São Tomé and Príncipe, Namibia | 10 & 13 October 2025 | |
| 12 | (England) Harry Amass | England U19 | Friendly | Belgium U19, Wales U19 | 11 & 14 October 2025 | |
| 18 | (Jamaica) Bailey Cadamarteri | Jamaica | 2026 FIFA World Cup qualification | Curaçao, Bermuda | 11 & 15 October 2025 | |
| 31 | (Wales) Will Grainger | Wales U19 | Friendly | Japan U19, (United States) USA U19, Germany U19 | 12, 15 & 18 November 2025 | |
| 25 | (Wales) Logan Stretch | Wales U19 | Friendly | Japan U19, (United States) USA U19, Germany U19 | 12, 15 & 18 November 2025 | |
| 12 | (England) Harry Amass | England U19 | 2026 UEFA European Under-19 Championship qualification | Lithuania U19, Latvia U19, Scotland U19 | 12, 15 & 18 November 2025 | |
| 18 | (Jamaica) Bailey Cadamarteri | Jamaica | 2026 FIFA World Cup qualification | Trinidad and Tobago, Curaçao | 14 & 19 November 2025 | |
| 7 | (Tunisia) Yan Valery | Tunisia | Friendly | Mauritania, Jordan, Brazil | 12, 14 & 18 November 2025 | |
| 4 | (Zimbabwe) Sean Fusire | Zimbabwe | Friendly | Algeria, Qatar | 13 & 17 November 2025 | |
| 7 | (Tunisia) Yan Valery | Tunisia | 2025 Africa Cup of Nations | Uganda, Nigeria, Tanzania, Mali | 23, 27 & 30 December 2025; 3 January 2026 | |
| 4 | (Zimbabwe) Sean Fusire | Zimbabwe | 2025 Africa Cup of Nations | Egypt, Angola, South Africa | 22, 26 & 29 December 2025 | |
| 18 | (Zimbabwe) Marvelous Nakamba | Zimbabwe | 2026 Four Nations Football Tournament | Botswana | 28 March 2026 | |
| 31 | (Wales) Will Grainger | Wales U19 | Friendly | (United States) USA U19 | 28 March 2026 | |
| 25 | (Wales) Logan Stretch | Wales U19 | Friendly | (United States) USA U19 | 28 March 2026 | |
| 9 | (Jamaica) Jamal Lowe | Jamaica | 2026 FIFA World Cup qualification | New Caledonia, (Democratic Republic of the Congo) DR Congo | 27 & 31 March 2026 | |
| 1 | (Northern Ireland) Pierce Charles | Northern Ireland | 2026 FIFA World Cup qualification, Friendly | Italy, Wales | 26 & 31 March 2026 | |
| 40 | (Northern Ireland) Devlan Moses | Northern Ireland U21 | 2027 UEFA European Under-21 Championship qualification | Germany U21, Latvia U21 | 27 & 31 March 2026 | |
| 22 | (Republic of Ireland) Gabriel Otegbayo | Republic of Ireland U21 | 2027 UEFA European Under-21 Championship qualification | Moldova U21, Kazakhstan U21 | 26 & 31 March 2026 | |
| 21 | (England) Joel Ndala | England U20 | Friendly | Italy U20 | 27 March 2026 | |
| 4 | (Zimbabwe) Sean Fusire | Zimbabwe | 2026 Unity Cup | Nigeria, India | 26 & 30 May 2026 | |
| 40 | (Northern Ireland) Devlan Moses | Northern Ireland U21 | Friendly | Portugal U21 | 3 June 2026 | |
| 1 | (Northern Ireland) Pierce Charles | Northern Ireland | Friendly | Guinea, France | 4 & 8 June 2026 | |

== Coaching staff ==
In July, manager Danny Röhl left the club by mutual consent alongside Chris Powell, Sascha Lense and Neil Thompson, whilst goalkeeping coach Sal Bibbo left to join Rangers in the same role. Assistant manager Henrik Pedersen signed a new contract as assistant manager just before Danny Röhl left, and was later promoted to replace him as manager.

In September, Craig Mudd joined the first teams coaching setup from Manchester City, linking up with Andy Holdsworth and Giles Coke in the first team dugout. Pete Shuttleworth joined the technical staff later in the month, having left Wycombe Wanderers a week prior. In early October, Darryl Flahavan returned to Wednesday for a second time as goalkeeper coach from Plymouth Argyle, completing Pedersen's first team staff. However the following week, Andy Parslow resigned as set-piece coach, following uncertainty of wages being paid.

In the academy, Jordan Broadbent, formerly the club’s Youth Development Phase Manager, was promoted to Under-18s manager.

As of 7 October 2025

| Role | Name |
|---|---|
| Manager | (Denmark) Henrik Pedersen |
| Coach | (England) Giles Coke |
| Coach | (England) Andy Holdsworth |
| Coach | (England) Craig Mudd |
| Coach | (England) Pete Shuttleworth |
| Goalkeeper coach | (England) Darryl Flahavan |

== Pre-season and friendlies ==
On 26 June, the players reported back for pre-season training, with U21 manager Andy Holdsworth reported to be taking first-team training. On 6 July, the club confirmed the previous week had seen focus on fitness and conditioning in smaller groups at the club’s training complex with together with tailored individual programmes away from S6, before the squad heads to St George’s Park for a week of training before returning the Middlewood Road where significant renovations then complete with a number of behind closed door friendlies scheduled. Mansfield Town confirmed a behind-closed-doors friendly on 7 July 2025. Manager Danny Röhl returned for pre-season training on 14 July, having missed the first 2 weeks. The club confirmed that Barry Bannan and Callum Paterson were training with the Owls during pre-season, despite being out of contract. A friendly against Burnley was scheduled for the final weekend of pre-season, but was cancelled due to payment not being made to players.

| 12 July 2025 Friendly | Manchester City U23 | 2–3 | Sheffield Wednesday | Burton upon Trent |
| | | Report | J. Lowe; Thornton; Kobacki | Stadium: St George’s Park; Attendance: 0 (Behind-closed-doors) |

| 19 July 2025 Friendly | Sheffield Wednesday | 3–0 | York City | Sheffield |
| | Ingelsson; Fusire; Johnson | Report | | Stadium: Middlewood Road; Attendance: 0 (Behind-closed-doors) |

| 26 July 2025 Friendly | Sheffield Wednesday | 2–0 | Mansfield Town | Sheffield |
| 15:00 BST | Kobacki; Ugbo | Report | | Stadium: Middlewood Road; Attendance: 0 (Behind-closed-doors) |

== Competitions ==
=== Overall record ===
| Competition | First match | Last match | Starting round | Final position | Record | | | | | | | |
| Competition | First match | Last match | Starting round | Final position | Pld | W | D | L | GF | GA | GD | Win % |
|---|---|---|---|---|---|---|---|---|---|---|---|---|
| Championship | 10 August 2025 | 2 May 2026 | Matchday 1 | 24th | 46 | 2 | 12 | 32 | 29 | 89 | −60 | 4.35 |
| FA Cup | 10 January 2026 | | Third round | Third round | 1 | 0 | 0 | 1 | 0 | 2 | −2 | 0.00 |
| EFL Cup | 13 August 2025 | 16 September 2025 | First round | Third round | 3 | 0 | 2 | 1 | 4 | 5 | −1 | 0.00 |
| Total | | | | | 50 | 2 | 14 | 34 | 33 | 96 | −63 | 4.00 |

Source: Soccerway

=== Championship ===
==== League table ====
| Pos | Team | Pld | W | D | L | GF | GA | GD | Pts | Promotion, qualification or relegation |
|---|---|---|---|---|---|---|---|---|---|---|
| 20 | Blackburn Rovers | 46 | 13 | 13 | 20 | 42 | 56 | −14 | 52 | |
| 21 | West Bromwich Albion | 46 | 13 | 14 | 19 | 48 | 58 | −10 | 51 (Note: West Bromwich Albion were deducted two points on 24 April 2026 for breaching PSR rules.) | |
| 22 | Oxford United (R) | 46 | 11 | 14 | 21 | 45 | 59 | −14 | 47 | Relegation to EFL League One |
| 23 | Leicester City (R) | 46 | 12 | 16 | 18 | 58 | 68 | −10 | 46 (Note: Leicester City were deducted six points on 5 February 2026 for breaching PSR rules.) | Relegation to EFL League One |
| 24 | Sheffield Wednesday (R) | 46 | 2 | 12 | 32 | 29 | 89 | −60 | 0 (Note: Sheffield Wednesday were deducted twelve points due to filing for administration on 24 October 2025, then deducted a further six points on 1 December 2025 for failing to fulfil payment obligations.) | Relegation to EFL League One |

Source: EFL Official Website
Rules for classification: 1) Points; 2) Goal difference; 3) Number of goals scored; 4) Head-to-head results; 5) Wins; 6) Away goals; 7) Penalty points (sec 9.5); 8) Number of 12-point sending off offences; 9) Play-off (only if needed to determine promotion/relegation)
(R) Relegated

==== Results summary ====
| Overall | | | | | | | | Home | | | | | | Away | | | | | |
| Pld | W | D | L | GF | GA | GD | Pts | W | D | L | GF | GA | GD | W | D | L | GF | GA | GD |
|---|---|---|---|---|---|---|---|---|---|---|---|---|---|---|---|---|---|---|---|
| 46 | 2 | 12 | 32 | 29 | 89 | −60 | 0 | 1 | 7 | 15 | 14 | 44 | −30 | 1 | 5 | 17 | 15 | 45 | −30 |

Source: Soccerway

==== Results by round ====
| Round | 1 | 2 | 3 | 4 | 5 | 6 | 7 | 8 | 9 | 10 | 11 | 12 | 13 | 14 | 15 | 16 | 17 | 18 | 20 | 21 | 22 | 23 | 24 | 25 | 26 | 27 | 28 | 29 | 30 | 19^{1} | 31 | 32 | 33 | 34 | 35 | 36 | 37 | 38 | 39 | 40 | 41 | 42 | 43 | 44 | 45 | 46 |
|---|---|---|---|---|---|---|---|---|---|---|---|---|---|---|---|---|---|---|---|---|---|---|---|---|---|---|---|---|---|---|---|---|---|---|---|---|---|---|---|---|---|---|---|---|---|---|
| Ground | A | H | A | H | H | A | H | A | H | A | H | H | A | H | A | H | A | H | A | H | A | H | H | A | A | H | H | A | H | A | A | H | A | A | H | A | H | H | A | A | H | A | H | A | A | H |
| Result | L | L | D | L | L | W | D | D | L | L | L | L | D | D | L | L | L | L | D | L | L | D | D | L | L | L | L | L | L | L | L | L | L | L | L | L | D | L | L | L | D | D | D | L | L | W |
| Position | 16 | 23 | 21 | 23 | 23 | 23 | 23 | 23 | 23 | 24 | 24 | 24 | 24 | 24 | 24 | 24 | 24 | 24 | 24 | 24 | 24 | 24 | 24 | 24 | 24 | 24 | 24 | 24 | 24 | 24 | 24 | 24 | 24 | 24 | 24 | 24 | 24 | 24 | 24 | 24 | 24 | 24 | 24 | 24 | 24 | 24 |
| Points | 0 | 0 | 1 | 1 | 1 | 4 | 5 | 6 | 6 | 6 | 6 | –6 | –5 | –4 | –4 | –4 | –4 | –10 | –9 | –9 | –9 | –8 | –7 | –7 | –7 | –7 | –7 | –7 | –7 | –7 | –7 | –7 | –7 | –7 | –7 | –7 | –6 | –6 | –6 | –6 | –5 | –4 | –3 | –3 | –3 | 0 |

Source: EFL
- ^{1} Matchday 19 (vs Blackburn Rovers) was abandoned due to a waterlogged pitch.
  A = Away; H = Home; W = Win; D = Draw; L = Loss; P = Postponed

==== Matches ====
On 26 June, the EFL Championship fixtures were released.

| 10 August 2025 1 | Leicester City | 2–1 | Sheffield Wednesday | Leicester |
| 16:30 BST | Vestergaard 54'; Faes 87' | Report | Chalobah 26'; Bannan (yellow card) 71' (yellow-red card) 76' | Stadium: King Power Stadium; Attendance: 31,102; Referee: Matt Donohue |
Note: Live on Sky Sports

| 16 August 2025 2 | Sheffield Wednesday | 0–3 | Stoke City | Sheffield |
| 15:00 BST | | Report | Manhoef 1', 69'; Lawal (yellow card) 13'; Mubama 46'; Johansson (yellow card) 68'; Tchamadeu (yellow card) 78' | Stadium: Hillsborough Stadium; Attendance: 21,683; Referee: Lewis Smith |

| 23 August 2025 3 | Wrexham | 2–2 | Sheffield Wednesday | Wrexham |
| 15:00 BST | Moore 15', 31' | Report | Bannan 63'; Cadamarteri 81' | Stadium: STōK Cae Ras; Attendance: 10,628; Referee: Farai Hallam |

| 30 August 2025 4 | Sheffield Wednesday | 0–2 | Swansea City | Sheffield |
| 15:00 BST | | Report | Franco (yellow card) 30'; Galbraith (yellow card) 34'; Vipotnik 50'; Ronald 81' | Stadium: Hillsborough Stadium; Attendance: 19,740; Referee: Anthony Backhouse |

| 13 September 2025 5 | Sheffield Wednesday | 0–3 | Bristol City | Sheffield |
| 15:00 BST | Palmer (yellow card) 7'; Valery (yellow card) 59' | Report | Amass 6' (o.g.); Riis 18'; Mehmeti 32' | Stadium: Hillsborough Stadium; Attendance: 20,003; Referee: Tom Nield |

| 20 September 2025 6 | Portsmouth | 0–2 | Sheffield Wednesday | Portsmouth |
| 15:00 BST | Swanson (yellow card) 45' | Report | Bannan 12'; Cadamarteri (yellow card) 17'; Valery (yellow card) 45'; Brown 50'; Horvath (yellow card) 62'; Iorfa (yellow card) 65'; M. Lowe (yellow card) 79' | Stadium: Fratton Park; Attendance: 20,225; Referee: Ruebyn Ricardo |

| 27 September 2025 7 | Sheffield Wednesday | 1–1 | Queens Park Rangers | Sheffield |
| 15:00 BST | Iorfa 30'; Bannan (yellow card) 54'; Ingelsson (yellow card) 85' | Report | Morrison (yellow card) 23'; Madsen 48' (pen.); Dembélé (yellow card) 88' | Stadium: Hillsborough Stadium; Attendance: 20,132; Referee: John Brooks |

| 30 September 2025 8 | Birmingham City | 2–2 | Sheffield Wednesday | Birmingham |
| 19:45 BST | Stansfield 9', (yellow card) 45+2'; Roberts (yellow card) 52'; Cochrane (yellow card) 75'; Gray 90+9' | Report | Palmer (yellow card) 20'; J. Lowe 37'; Brown 76'; Iorfa (yellow card) 90+11' | Stadium: St. Andrew's @ Knighthead Park; Attendance: 27,323; Referee: Matt Donohue |
Note: Live on Sky Sports

| 4 October 2025 9 | Sheffield Wednesday | 0–5 | Coventry City | Sheffield |
| 12:30 BST | Iorfa (yellow card) 45+5' | Report | Thomas-Asante 3', 33'; Wright 45+6'; Dasilva (yellow card) 62'; Simms 68'; Sakamoto 75' | Stadium: Hillsborough Stadium; Attendance: 22,224; Referee: Adam Herczeg |
Note: Live on Sky Sports

| 18 October 2025 10 | Charlton Athletic | 2–1 | Sheffield Wednesday | Charlton |
| 15:00 BST | Coventry (yellow card) 10'; Carey 17'; Burke 45+1' | Report | Otegbayo (yellow card) 7'; J. Lowe 69'; Fusire (yellow card) 85'; Horvath (red card) 90+7' | Stadium: The Valley; Attendance: 23,009; Referee: Tom Reeves |

| 22 October 2025 11 | Sheffield Wednesday | 0–1 | Middlesbrough | Sheffield |
| 20:00 BST | Fusire (yellow card) 72'; Lumley (yellow card) 83'; Valery (yellow card) 89' | Report | Whittaker 6'; Hackney (yellow card) 74' | Stadium: Hillsborough Stadium; Attendance: 7,081; Referee: Thomas Kirk |
Note: Live on Sky Sports

| 25 October 2025 12 | Sheffield Wednesday | 1–2 | Oxford United | Sheffield |
| 15:00 BST | Fusire 53' | Report | Lankshear 12'; Brannagan 36' | Stadium: Hillsborough Stadium; Attendance: 27,261; Referee: Paul Tierney |

| 1 November 2025 13 | West Bromwich Albion | 0–0 | Sheffield Wednesday | West Bromwich |
| 12:30 GMT | Maja (yellow card) 85' | Report | Ugbo (yellow card) 70' | Stadium: The Hawthorns; Attendance: 23,622; Referee: Ben Toner |
Note: Live on Sky Sports

| 5 November 2025 14 | Sheffield Wednesday | 1–1 | Norwich City | Sheffield |
| 19:45 GMT | Bannan 4' | Report | Duffy (yellow card) 17'; Kvistgaarden 61'; Fisher (yellow card) 62'; Schlupp (yellow card) 86'; McConville (yellow card) 90+6' | Stadium: Hillsborough Stadium; Attendance: 28,156; Referee: Edward Duckworth |
Note: Live on Sky Sports

| 8 November 2025 15 | Southampton | 3–1 | Sheffield Wednesday | Southampton |
| 15:00 GMT | Jander 9', (yellow card) 53'; Azaz 17'; Armstrong 47'; Bazunu (yellow card) 62' | Report | Amass 25'; Palmer (yellow card) 34'; Bannan (yellow card) 39' | Stadium: St Mary's Stadium; Attendance: 27,607; Referee: Ruebyn Ricardo |

| 23 November 2025 16 | Sheffield Wednesday | 0–3 | Sheffield United | Sheffield |
| 12:00 GMT | Iorfa (yellow card) 36'; Fusire (yellow card) 45'; Amass (yellow card) 64' | Report | Campbell 11', 48'; Cannon 90+1' | Stadium: Hillsborough Stadium; Attendance: 32,740; Referee: David Webb |
Note: Live on Sky Sports

| 26 November 2025 17 | Millwall | 1–0 | Sheffield Wednesday | Bermondsey |
| 19:45 GMT | Azeez 71' | Report | Cooper (yellow card) 41'; Iorfa (yellow card) 45+1'; Bannan (yellow card) 88' | Stadium: The Den; Attendance: 13,958; Referee: Jacob Miles |
Note: Live on Sky Sports

| 29 November 2025 18 | Sheffield Wednesday | 2–3 | Preston North End | Sheffield |
| 15:00 GMT | McNeill 3', 14', (penalty missed) 73'; Cadamarteri (yellow card) 70' | Report | Whiteman 10'; Offiah (yellow card) 34'; Dobbin 57'; Frøkjær-Jensen 76' | Stadium: Hillsborough Stadium; Attendance: 22,652; Referee: Oliver Langford |

| 9 December 2025 20 | Watford | 1–1 | Sheffield Wednesday | Watford |
| 19:45 GMT | Maamma (yellow card) 11'; Louza (penalty missed) 72'; Semedo 90+7' | Report | McNeill 17'; Chalobah (yellow card) 90+4' | Stadium: Vicarage Road; Attendance: 16,834; Referee: Dean Whitestone |
Note: Live on Sky Sports

| 15 December 2025 21 | Sheffield Wednesday | 0–3 | Derby County | Sheffield |
| 20:00 GMT | Iorfa (yellow card) 56'; M. Lowe (yellow card) 79'; McNeill (yellow card) 84'; Amass (yellow card) 87' | Report | Agyemang 32', 62', (yellow card) 56'; Thompson 57' | Stadium: Hillsborough Stadium; Attendance: 23,466; Referee: Lewis Smith |
Note: Live on Sky Sports

| 20 December 2025 22 | Ipswich Town | 3–1 | Sheffield Wednesday | Ipswich |
| 15:00 GMT | Kipré 33'; Philogene 60'; Furlong (yellow card) 78'; Clarke 87' | Report | Cooper (yellow card) 49', (goal) 71' | Stadium: Portman Road; Attendance: 28,680; Referee: David Webb |

| 26 December 2025 23 | Sheffield Wednesday | 2–2 | Hull City | Sheffield |
| 15:00 GMT | Ingelsson 21'; Cadamarteri 60'; J. Lowe (yellow card) 76'; Bannan (yellow card) 90+8' | Report | Egan (yellow card) 28'; Crooks (yellow card) 35', (goal) 65'; McBurnie (yellow card) 46'; Belloumi 37'; Destan (yellow card) 87' | Stadium: Hillsborough Stadium; Attendance: 27,929; Referee: Stephen Martin |
Note: Live on Sky Sports

| 29 December 2025 24 | Sheffield Wednesday | 0–0 | Blackburn Rovers | Sheffield |
| 19:45 GMT | Bannan (yellow card) 57'; J. Lowe (yellow card) 60' | Report | Tronstad (yellow card) 68'; Gardner-Hickman (yellow card) 85'; Cantwell (yellow card) 89' | Stadium: Hillsborough Stadium; Attendance: 22,532; Referee: Oliver Langford |
Note: Live on Sky Sports

| 1 January 2026 25 | Preston North End | 3–0 | Sheffield Wednesday | Preston |
| 15:00 GMT | McCann 28'; Storey (yellow card) 55'; Osmajić 61', (yellow card) 70'; Dobbin 85' | Report | | Stadium: Deepdale; Attendance: 18,069; Referee: Gavin Ward |

| 4 January 2026 26 | Queens Park Rangers | 3–0 | Sheffield Wednesday | Shepherd's Bush |
| 12:00 GMT | Burrell 14'; Kolli 81', 88' | Report | | Stadium: MATRADE Loftus Road Stadium; Attendance: 16,327; Referee: Sam Allison |
Note: Live on Sky Sports

| 17 January 2026 27 | Sheffield Wednesday | 0–1 | Portsmouth | Sheffield |
| 15:00 GMT | | Report | Ogilvie (yellow card) 31'; Segečić 65'; Chaplin (yellow card) 77' | Stadium: Hillsborough Stadium; Attendance: 21,351; Referee: John Busby |

| 20 January 2026 28 | Sheffield Wednesday | 0–2 | Birmingham City | Sheffield |
| 19:45 GMT | Johnson (yellow card) 41'; J. Lowe (yellow card) 56' | Report | Ducksch 83'; Stansfield (yellow card) 87'; Furuhashi 90+2' | Stadium: Hillsborough Stadium; Attendance: 22,396; Referee: Leigh Doughty |
Note: Live on Sky Sports

| 24 January 2026 29 | Bristol City | 2–0 | Sheffield Wednesday | Bristol |
| 15:00 GMT | Twine 64'; Bell 78' | Report | | Stadium: Ashton Gate; Attendance: 23,418; Referee: Ben Speedie |

| 31 January 2026 30 | Sheffield Wednesday | 0–1 | Wrexham | Sheffield |
| 12:30 GMT | | Report | Smith 58' | Stadium: Hillsborough Stadium; Attendance: 23,297; Referee: David Webb |
Note: Live on Sky Sports

| 3 February 2026 19 | Blackburn Rovers | 1–0 | Sheffield Wednesday | Blackburn |
| 19:45 GMT | Cashin 12'; Baradji (yellow card) 47' | Report | | Stadium: Ewood Park; Attendance: 12,285; Referee: Dean Whitestone |
Note: Original fixture took place on 6 December, but was abandoned due to a waterlogged pitch.

| 8 February 2026 31 | Swansea City | 4–0 | Sheffield Wednesday | Swansea |
| 12:00 GMT | Cabango (yellow card) 12'; Franco 19'; Stamenić (yellow card) 42'; Vipotnik 70', 79'; Yalcouyé 88' | Report | Heskey (yellow card) 69'; Nakamba (yellow card) 90' | Stadium: Swansea.com Stadium; Attendance: 16,776; Referee: Thomas Kirk |
Note: Live on Sky Sports

| 14 February 2026 32 | Sheffield Wednesday | 1–2 | Millwall | Sheffield |
| 15:00 GMT | McGhee (yellow card) 36'; J. Lowe (yellow card) 50', (goal) 60'; Otegbayo (yellow card) 87' | Report | De Norre (yellow card) 40'; Taylor (yellow card) 67'; McGhee 72' (o.g.); Langstaff 74' | Stadium: Hillsborough Stadium; Attendance: 22,488; Referee: Ed Duckworth |

| 22 February 2026 33 | Sheffield United | 2–1 | Sheffield Wednesday | Sheffield |
| 12:00 GMT | Bamford 2'; Burrows 19'; Phillips (red card) 49'; Arblaster (yellow card) 85' | Report | Heskey (yellow card) 16'; Ingelsson (yellow card) 26'; McNeill 53', (yellow card) 65'; Cooper (yellow card) 62'; Otegbayo (yellow card) 82' (yellow-red card) 90'; Moses (yellow card) 90+4' | Stadium: Bramall Lane; Attendance: 30,457; Referee: Josh Smith |
Note: Live on Sky Sports

| 25 February 2026 34 | Norwich City | 2–0 | Sheffield Wednesday | Norwich |
| 19:45 GMT | Kvistgaarden 31'; Maghoma 36' | Report | | Stadium: Carrow Road; Attendance: 25,141; Referee: Ruebyn Ricardo |
Note: Live on Sky Sports

| 28 February 2026 35 | Sheffield Wednesday | 1–3 | Southampton | Sheffield |
| 15:00 GMT | Yates 57' | Report | Bree 17'; Manning 45+1'; Harwood-Bellis 71'; Bragg (yellow card) 89' | Stadium: Hillsborough Stadium; Attendance: 23,850; Referee: Gavin Ward |

| 7 March 2026 36 | Derby County | 2–1 | Sheffield Wednesday | Derby |
| 15:00 GMT | Brereton Díaz 11', (yellow card) 33'; Clarke 45' | Report | Yates 17'; Palmer (yellow card) 37' | Stadium: Pride Park Stadium; Attendance: 30,937; Referee: Oliver Langford |

| 10 March 2026 37 | Sheffield Wednesday | 1–1 | Watford | Sheffield |
| 19:45 GMT | Yates 54'; Heskey (yellow card) 63'; Adaramola (yellow card) 69'; Ingelsson (yellow card) 81' | Report | Goglichidze (yellow card) 31'; Abankwah (yellow card) 68'; Ekwah (yellow card) 76'; Semedo 90' | Stadium: Hillsborough Stadium; Attendance: 19,653; Referee: Elliot Bell |
Note: Live on Sky Sports

| 14 March 2026 38 | Sheffield Wednesday | 0–2 | Ipswich Town | Sheffield |
| 15:00 GMT | Thornton (yellow card) 50'; Fusire (yellow card) 54'; Adaramola (yellow card) 57' | Report | Burns (yellow card) 57'; Azón 78'; Clarke 83' (pen.) | Stadium: Hillsborough Stadium; Attendance: 23,437; Referee: Tom Reeves |

| 21 March 2026 39 | Hull City | 3–1 | Sheffield Wednesday | Kingston upon Hull |
| 15:00 GMT | Crooks 24', (yellow card) 49'; Iorfa 45+6' (o.g.); Egan (yellow card) 42'; Joseph 58'; Lundstram (yellow card) 88' | Report | J. Lowe 23'; McNeill (yellow card) 89' | Stadium: MKM Stadium; Attendance: 22,004; Referee: Dean Whitestone |

| 3 April 2026 40 | Stoke City | 2–0 | Sheffield Wednesday | Stoke-on-Trent |
| 15:00 BST | Rak-Sakyi 32', (yellow card) 42'; Cissé 57'; Baker (yellow card) 78' | Report | Fusire (yellow card) 18' | Stadium: Bet365 Stadium; Attendance: 25,450; Referee: Michael Salisbury |
Note: Live on Sky Sports

| 6 April 2026 41 | Sheffield Wednesday | 1–1 | Leicester City | Sheffield |
| 15:00 BST | Yates 2' | Report | Ayew 84' | Stadium: Hillsborough Stadium; Attendance: 24,223; Referee: Leigh Doughty |
Note: Live on Sky Sports

| 11 April 2026 42 | Coventry City | 0–0 | Sheffield Wednesday | Coventry |
| 12:30 BST | | Report | Ingelsson (yellow card) 37'; Yates (yellow card) 54'; Charles (yellow card) 78' | Stadium: Coventry Building Society Arena; Attendance: 31,647; Referee: Matt Donohue |
Note: Live on Sky Sports

| 18 April 2026 43 | Sheffield Wednesday | 1–1 | Charlton Athletic | Sheffield |
| 15:00 BST | Heskey (yellow card) 65'; Otegbayo 76' | Report | Docherty (yellow card) 15'; Godden 49'; Clarke (yellow card) 61' | Stadium: Hillsborough Stadium; Attendance: 23,538; Referee: Thomas Parsons |

| 22 April 2026 44 | Middlesbrough | 1–0 | Sheffield Wednesday | Middlesbrough |
| 19:45 BST | Whittaker 11', (yellow card) 30'; Malanda (yellow card) 52' | Report | Thornton (yellow card) 51'; M. Lowe (yellow card) 70' | Stadium: Riverside Stadium; Attendance: 25,245; Referee: David Webb |
Note: Live on Sky Sports was originally scheduled for Tuesday 21st but got moved a day due to Middlesbrough game against Ipswich being on Sunday 19th

| 25 April 2026 45 | Oxford United | 4–1 | Sheffield Wednesday | Oxford |
| 15:00 BST | Lankshear 5', 27'; Vaulks 67'; Peart-Harris 73'; Spencer (yellow card) 82' | Report | Grainger 72' | Stadium: Kassam Stadium; Attendance: 12,476; Referee: Robert Madley |

| 2 May 2026 46 | Sheffield Wednesday | 2–1 | West Bromwich Albion | Sheffield |
| 12:30 BST | Chalobah (yellow card) 32', (goal) 36'; Palmer 40'; M. Lowe (yellow card) 57'; Heskey (yellow card) 81' | Report | Diakité (yellow card) 12'; Grant 82'; Bany (yellow card) 90' | Stadium: Hillsborough Stadium; Attendance: 33,750; Referee: Lewis Smith |
Note: Live on Sky Sports

=== FA Cup ===
Sheffield Wednesday entered the FA Cup in the third round, and were drawn home to Brentford.

| 10 January 2026 Third round | Sheffield Wednesday | 0–2 | Brentford | Sheffield |
| 15:00 GMT | | Report | Lewis Potter 27'; Jensen 64' (pen.) | Stadium: Hillsborough Stadium; Attendance: 10,642; Referee: Josh Smith |

=== EFL Cup ===
On 26 June, the draw for the first round was made, with Sheffield Wednesday being drawn away against Bolton Wanderers. Before their win against Bolton Wanderers, they were drawn against Leeds United in the second round. The third round draw took place the following day and they were drawn against Grimsby Town, who they had beaten the previous season.

| 13 August 2025 First round | Bolton Wanderers | 3–3 (2–4 p) | Sheffield Wednesday | Horwich |
| 19:45 BST | Inwood (red card) 27'; Osei-Tutu 36'; Forino (yellow card) 45'; Gale 77'; Cozier-Duberry 90+2' | Report | Siqueira 8'; Ugbo 37'; Thornton (yellow card) 70'; Johnson 80' | Stadium: Toughsheet Community Stadium; Attendance: 8,208; Referee: Oliver Langford |
| | Penalties |
| | Morley (penalty missed); Cozier-Duberry (penalty scored); Burstow (penalty scored); Conway (penalty missed) | | (penalty scored) McNeill; (penalty scored) J. Lowe; (penalty scored) M. Lowe; (penalty scored) Palmer |
Note: Live on Sky Sports

| 26 August 2025 Second round | Sheffield Wednesday | 1–1 (3–0 p) | Leeds United | Sheffield |
| 20:00 BST | J. Lowe 63'; Shipston (yellow card) 72'; Johnson (yellow card) 90' | Report | Bogle 81' | Stadium: Hillsborough Stadium; Attendance: 7,801; Referee: Robert Jones |
| | Penalties |
| | Bannan (penalty scored); Ugbo (penalty scored); Palmer (penalty scored) | | (penalty missed) Piroe; (penalty missed) Calvert-Lewin; (penalty missed) Longstaff |
Note: Live on Sky Sports

| 16 September 2025 Third round | Sheffield Wednesday | 0–1 | Grimsby Town | Sheffield |
| 19:45 BST | McGhee (yellow card) 18'; Otegbayo (yellow card) 81' | Report | Staunton (yellow card) 42'; Kabia 50' | Stadium: Hillsborough Stadium; Attendance: 9,424; Referee: Elliot Bell |
Note: Live on Sky Sports

== Transfers & contracts ==
=== In ===
| Date | Pos. | Player | From | Fee | Ref. |
|---|---|---|---|---|---|
| 2 July 2025 | LB | (England) Harry Evers † | (England) Liverpool | Free | |
| 2 July 2025 | CB | (England) Cole McGhee † | (England) Preston North End | Free | |
| 2 July 2025 | CM | (England) Denny Oliver † | (England) Lincoln City | Free | |
| 17 November 2025 | CB | (Scotland) Liam Cooper | (Bulgaria) CSKA Sofia | Free | |
| 27 November 2025 | RW | (England) Nathan Redmond | (England) Burnley | Free | |
| 2 February 2026 | DM | (Zimbabwe) Marvelous Nakamba | (England) Luton Town | Free | |
| 26 February 2026 | LW | (England) Zain Silcott-Duberry | (Greece) Olympiacos B | Free | |

† Signed for the academy

=== Out ===
| Date | Pos. | Player | To | Fee | Ref. |
|---|---|---|---|---|---|
| 10 July 2025 | CM | (England) Sutura Kakay | (England) Southampton | Undisclosed | |
| 12 July 2025 | RW | (Netherlands) Anthony Musaba | (Turkey) Samsunspor | Undisclosed | |
| 15 July 2025 | LW | (France) Djeidi Gassama | (Scotland) Rangers | Undisclosed | |
| 23 July 2025 | CF | (Scotland) Caelan Cadamarteri | (England) Manchester City | Undisclosed | |
| 12 January 2026 | GK | (Republic of Ireland) Killian Barrett | (England) Barrow | Undisclosed | |
| 26 January 2026 | LB | (England) Yisa Alao | (England) Chelsea | Undisclosed | |
| 28 January 2026 | CM | (Scotland) Barry Bannan | (England) Millwall | Undisclosed | |
| 2 February 2026 | CF | (Jamaica) Bailey Cadamarteri | (Wales) Wrexham | Undisclosed | |

=== Loaned in ===
| Date | Pos | Player | Loaned from | Date until | Ref |
|---|---|---|---|---|---|
| 22 August 2025 | GK | (United States) Ethan Horvath | (Wales) Cardiff City | 2 January 2026 | |
| 1 September 2025 | LB | (England) Harry Amass | (England) Manchester United | 5 January 2026 | |
| 21 October 2025 | GK | (England) Joe Lumley | (England) Bristol City | 27 October 2025 | |
| 16 January 2026 | CM | (England) Jaden Heskey | (England) Manchester City | End of season | |
| 16 January 2026 | GK | (England) Murphy Cooper | (England) Queens Park Rangers | End of season | |
| 30 January 2026 | CF | (England) Jerry Yates | (England) Luton Town | End of season | |
| 1 February 2026 | LB | (Republic of Ireland) Tayo Adaramola | (England) Crystal Palace | End of season | |
| 2 February 2026 | LW | (England) Joel Ndala | (England) Manchester City | End of season | |
| 20 February 2026 | GK | (Senegal) Seny Dieng | (England) Middlesbrough | 5 March 2026 (Note: Seny Dieng's loan was extended by a further 7 days on 27 February 2026) | |

=== Loaned out ===
| Date | Pos | Player | Loaned from | Date until | Ref |
|---|---|---|---|---|---|
| 15 November 2025 | GK | (Republic of Ireland) Killian Barrett | (England) Boston United | 10 January 2026 (Note: Killian Barrett's loan was extended on 16 December 2025 for an additional month) | |
| 30 December 2025 | AM | (England) Liam Clayton | (England) Penistone Church | 30 January 2026 | |
| 23 January 2026 | LB | (England) Harry Evers | (England) Trafford | End of season (Note: Harry Evers's loan was extended on 25 March 2026 until the end of the season) | |
| 9 February 2026 | RB | (Tunisia) Yan Valery | (Switzerland) Young Boys | End of season | |
| 13 February 2026 | RW | (England) Junior Kamwa | (England) Brighouse Town | 18 March 2026 | |
| 13 February 2026 | CM | (England) Denny Oliver | (England) Brighouse Town | 18 March 2026 | |
| 20 March 2026 | CM | (England) Denny Oliver | (England) Bridlington Town | End of season | |

=== Released / Out of Contract ===
| Date | Pos. | Player | Subsequent club | Join date | Ref. |
|---|---|---|---|---|---|
| 30 June 2025 | GK | (England) Jack Hall | (England) Bradford (Park Avenue) | 1 July 2025 | |
| 30 June 2025 | CM | (England) Finley Hunt | (England) Golcar United | 1 July 2025 | |
| 30 June 2025 | CB | (England) Michael Ihiekwe | (England) Blackpool | 1 July 2025 | |
| 30 June 2025 | RW | (Zimbabwe) Joey Phuthi | (England) Eastbourne Borough | 1 July 2025 | |
| 30 June 2025 | LB | (England) Sam Reed | (England) Altrincham | 1 July 2025 | |
| 30 June 2025 | CF | (England) Ari-Jae Shaw | (England) Stourbridge | 1 July 2025 | |
| 30 June 2025 | RB | (Spain) Pol Valentín | (England) Preston North End | 1 July 2025 | |
| 30 June 2025 | RW | (England) Mallik Wilks | (Turkey) Pendikspor | 9 July 2025 | |
| 17 July 2025 | CF | (England) Michael Smith | (England) Preston North End | 22 July 2025 | |
| 17 July 2025 | AM | (England) Josh Windass | (Wales) Wrexham | 23 July 2025 | |
| 30 June 2025 | CF | (Scotland) Callum Paterson | (England) Milton Keynes Dons | 28 July 2025 | |
| 30 June 2025 | CB | (England) Akin Famewo | (England) Hull City | 29 July 2025 | |
| 30 June 2025 | CB | (England) Harris Lihe | (United States) Mars Hill Lions | 1 August 2025 | |
| 30 June 2025 | LM | (England) Dominic Weston | (England) Pickering Town | 4 August 2025 | |
| 30 June 2025 | CM | (England) Jay Buchan | (England) Guiseley | 8 August 2025 | |
| 30 June 2025 | CF | (England) Caiden Remy-Dee | (England) Ware | 9 August 2025 | |
| 30 June 2025 | LB | (Japan) Ryō Hatsuse | (Japan) Gamba Osaka | 13 August 2025 | |
| 30 June 2025 | CM | (England) Voldi Mbaya | (England) Barnsley | 18 August 2025 | |
| 30 June 2025 | CM | (Scotland) Stuart Armstrong | (Scotland) Aberdeen | 2 September 2025 | |
| 30 June 2025 | GK | (England) Ben Hamer | (England) Queens Park Rangers | 19 September 2025 | |
| 30 June 2025 | LB | (England) Marvin Johnson | (England) Port Vale | 13 October 2025 | |
| 30 June 2025 | LB | (England) Cian Flannery | (England) Curzon Ashton | 2 December 2025 | |
| 30 January 2026 | RW | (England) Nathan Redmond | (England) Blackburn Rovers | 27 March 2026 | |
| 30 June 2025 | CB | (England) Jack Swales | | | |

=== Contracts ===
| Date | Pos. | Player | Length | Expiry | Ref. |
|---|---|---|---|---|---|
| 2 July 2025 | CB | (England) Joe Emery | – | – | |
| 2 July 2025 | GK | (Wales) Logan Stretch | – | – | |
| 2 July 2025 | CB | (England) Ernie Weaver | – | – | |
| 8 July 2025 | CF | (England) George Brown | – | – | |
| 8 July 2025 | CM | (England) Rio Shipston | – | – | |
| 11 July 2025 | LW | (England) Favour Onukwuli | – | – | |
| 2 August 2025 | CM | (Scotland) Barry Bannan | – | – | |
| 16 May 2026 | CF | (England) George Brown | One-year option | 30 June 2027 | |
| 16 May 2026 | CB | (England) Joe Emery | One-year option | 30 June 2027 | |
| 16 May 2026 | CM | (Sweden) Svante Ingelsson | One-year option | 30 June 2027 | |
| 16 May 2026 | RW | (Jamaica) Jamal Lowe | One-year option | 30 June 2027 | |
| 16 May 2026 | CB | (England) Cole McGhee | One-year option | 30 June 2027 | |
| 16 May 2026 | CM | (England) Denny Oliver | One-year option | 30 June 2027 | |
| 16 May 2026 | RB | (Scotland) Liam Palmer | One-year option | 30 June 2027 | |
| 16 May 2026 | GK | (Wales) Logan Stretch | One-year option | 30 June 2027 | |
| 16 May 2026 | CB | (England) Ernie Weaver | One-year option | 30 June 2027 | |

== Squad statistics ==
=== Appearances ===
| No. | Pos | Nat | Player | Total | | Championship | | FA Cup | | EFL Cup | |
| No. | Pos | Nat | Player | Apps | Goals | Apps | Goals | Apps | Goals | Apps | Goals |
|---|---|---|---|---|---|---|---|---|---|---|---|
| 1 | GK | (Northern Ireland) NIR | Pierce Charles | 21 | 0 | 19 | 0 | 1 | 0 | 1 | 0 |
| 2 | DF | (Scotland) SCO | Liam Palmer | 47 | 1 | 42+3 | 1 | 0 | 0 | 0+2 | 0 |
| 3 | DF | (England) ENG | Max Lowe | 29 | 0 | 27+1 | 0 | 0 | 0 | 0+1 | 0 |
| 4 | MF | (Zimbabwe) ZIM | Sean Fusire | 39 | 1 | 23+12 | 1 | 1 | 0 | 2+1 | 0 |
| 6 | DF | (England) ENG | Dominic Iorfa | 34 | 1 | 32+2 | 1 | 0 | 0 | 0 | 0 |
| 8 | MF | (Sweden) SWE | Svante Ingelsson | 41 | 1 | 39+1 | 1 | 1 | 0 | 0 | 0 |
| 9 | FW | (Jamaica) JAM | Jamal Lowe | 48 | 5 | 37+8 | 4 | 0 | 0 | 2+1 | 1 |
| 11 | FW | (Canada) CAN | Iké Ugbo | 24 | 1 | 6+15 | 0 | 0 | 0 | 1+2 | 1 |
| 12 | FW | (England) ENG | Jerry Yates | 18 | 4 | 17+1 | 4 | 0 | 0 | 0 | 0 |
| 13 | GK | (England) ENG | Murphy Cooper | 9 | 0 | 9 | 0 | 0 | 0 | 0 | 0 |
| 14 | MF | (England) ENG | Nathaniel Chalobah | 13 | 2 | 7+6 | 2 | 0 | 0 | 0 | 0 |
| 16 | DF | (Scotland) SCO | Liam Cooper | 14 | 1 | 10+4 | 1 | 0 | 0 | 0 | 0 |
| 17 | FW | (England) ENG | Charlie McNeill | 43 | 4 | 23+17 | 4 | 1 | 0 | 1+1 | 0 |
| 18 | MF | (Zimbabwe) ZIM | Marvelous Nakamba | 4 | 0 | 0+4 | 0 | 0 | 0 | 0 | 0 |
| 19 | FW | (Poland) POL | Olaf Kobacki | 15 | 0 | 4+9 | 0 | 0 | 0 | 2 | 0 |
| 20 | MF | (England) ENG | Rio Shipston | 8 | 0 | 0+4 | 0 | 1 | 0 | 3 | 0 |
| 21 | FW | (England) ENG | Joel Ndala | 8 | 0 | 3+5 | 0 | 0 | 0 | 0 | 0 |
| 22 | DF | (Republic of Ireland) IRL | Gabriel Otegbayo | 38 | 1 | 28+7 | 1 | 1 | 0 | 1+1 | 0 |
| 23 | DF | (Brazil) BRA | Gui Siqueira | 2 | 1 | 0 | 0 | 0 | 0 | 2 | 1 |
| 24 | MF | (England) ENG | Jaden Heskey | 20 | 0 | 19+1 | 0 | 0 | 0 | 0 | 0 |
| 25 | GK | (Wales) WAL | Logan Stretch | 1 | 0 | 0 | 0 | 0+1 | 0 | 0 | 0 |
| 27 | DF | (England) ENG | Reece Johnson | 16 | 1 | 4+8 | 0 | 0+1 | 0 | 3 | 1 |
| 28 | DF | (England) ENG | Cole McGhee | 13 | 0 | 7+3 | 0 | 1 | 0 | 2 | 0 |
| 29 | FW | (England) ENG | George Brown | 9 | 2 | 3+4 | 2 | 0 | 0 | 2 | 0 |
| 30 | DF | (England) ENG | Ernie Weaver | 9 | 0 | 4+2 | 0 | 0 | 0 | 3 | 0 |
| 31 | FW | (Wales) WAL | Will Grainger | 8 | 1 | 1+5 | 1 | 0+1 | 0 | 0+1 | 0 |
| 32 | DF | (England) ENG | Joe Emery | 7 | 0 | 0+3 | 0 | 1 | 0 | 2+1 | 0 |
| 36 | MF | (Portugal) POR | Bruno Fernandes | 5 | 0 | 0+4 | 0 | 0 | 0 | 1 | 0 |
| 37 | MF | (England) ENG | Jarvis Thornton | 27 | 0 | 12+11 | 0 | 1 | 0 | 3 | 0 |
| 40 | FW | (Northern Ireland) NIR | Devlan Moses | 9 | 0 | 0+8 | 0 | 0+1 | 0 | 0 | 0 |
| 41 | FW | (England) ENG | Favour Onukwuli | 3 | 0 | 0+3 | 0 | 0 | 0 | 0 | 0 |
| 44 | DF | (England) ENG | Mackenzie Maltby | 2 | 0 | 0+2 | 0 | 0 | 0 | 0 | 0 |
| 45 | DF | (England) ENG | Tayo Adaramola | 16 | 0 | 15+1 | 0 | 0 | 0 | 0 | 0 |
Players out on loan:
| 7 | DF | (Tunisia) TUN | Yan Valery | 23 | 0 | 23 | 0 | 0 | 0 | 0 | 0 |
Players that left the club mid-season:
| 10 | MF | (Scotland) SCO | Barry Bannan | 30 | 3 | 28 | 3 | 0 | 0 | 0+2 | 0 |
| 12 | DF | (England) ENG | Harry Amass | 21 | 1 | 21 | 1 | 0 | 0 | 0 | 0 |
| 13 | GK | (England) ENG | Joe Lumley | 2 | 0 | 2 | 0 | 0 | 0 | 0 | 0 |
| 15 | FW | (England) ENG | Nathan Redmond | 7 | 0 | 0+6 | 0 | 0+1 | 0 | 0 | 0 |
| 18 | FW | (Jamaica) JAM | Bailey Cadamarteri | 30 | 2 | 23+6 | 2 | 1 | 0 | 0 | 0 |
| 24 | GK | (United States) USA | Ethan Horvath | 16 | 0 | 14 | 0 | 0 | 0 | 2 | 0 |
| 33 | DF | (England) ENG | Yisa Alao | 5 | 0 | 1+1 | 0 | 1 | 0 | 0+2 | 0 |
| 33 | GK | (Senegal) SEN | Seny Dieng | 3 | 0 | 3 | 0 | 0 | 0 | 0 | 0 |

=== Goalscorers ===
| Rank | Pos. | Nat. | No. | Player | Championship | FA Cup | EFL Cup | Total |
|---|---|---|---|---|---|---|---|---|
| 1 | FW | (Jamaica) | 9 | Jamal Lowe | 4 | 0 | 1 | 5 |
| 2 | FW | (England) | 12 | Jerry Yates | 4 | 0 | 0 | 4 |
| 2 | FW | (England) | 17 | Charlie McNeill | 4 | 0 | 0 | 4 |
| 4 | MF | (Scotland) | 10 | Barry Bannan | 3 | 0 | 0 | 3 |
| 5 | MF | (England) | 14 | Nathaniel Chalobah | 2 | 0 | 0 | 2 |
| 5 | FW | (Jamaica) | 18 | Bailey Cadamarteri | 2 | 0 | 0 | 2 |
| 5 | FW | (England) | 29 | George Brown | 2 | 0 | 0 | 2 |
| 8 | DF | (Scotland) | 2 | Liam Palmer | 1 | 0 | 0 | 1 |
| 8 | MF | (Zimbabwe) | 4 | Sean Fusire | 1 | 0 | 0 | 1 |
| 8 | DF | (England) | 6 | Dominic Iorfa | 1 | 0 | 0 | 1 |
| 8 | MF | (Sweden) | 8 | Svante Ingelsson | 1 | 0 | 0 | 1 |
| 8 | FW | (Canada) | 11 | Iké Ugbo | 0 | 0 | 1 | 1 |
| 8 | DF | (England) | 12 | Harry Amass | 1 | 0 | 0 | 1 |
| 8 | DF | (Scotland) | 16 | Liam Cooper | 1 | 0 | 0 | 1 |
| 8 | DF | (Republic of Ireland) | 22 | Gabriel Otegbayo | 1 | 0 | 0 | 1 |
| 8 | DF | (Brazil) | 23 | Gui Siqueira | 0 | 0 | 1 | 1 |
| 8 | DF | (England) | 27 | Reece Johnson | 0 | 0 | 1 | 1 |
| 8 | FW | (Wales) | 31 | Will Grainger | 1 | 0 | 0 | 1 |
| Total | | | | | 29 | 0 | 4 | 33 |

=== Assists ===
| Rank | Pos. | Nat. | No. | Player | Championship | FA Cup | EFL Cup | Total |
|---|---|---|---|---|---|---|---|---|
| 1 | FW | (Jamaica) | 9 | Jamal Lowe | 3 | 0 | 0 | 3 |
| 1 | MF | (Scotland) | 10 | Barry Bannan | 3 | 0 | 0 | 3 |
| 3 | GK | (Northern Ireland) | 1 | Pierce Charles | 1 | 0 | 0 | 1 |
| 3 | DF | (Scotland) | 2 | Liam Palmer | 1 | 0 | 0 | 1 |
| 3 | DF | (England) | 3 | Max Lowe | 1 | 0 | 0 | 1 |
| 3 | DF | (Zimbabwe) | 4 | Sean Fusire | 1 | 0 | 0 | 1 |
| 3 | DF | (Tunisia) | 7 | Yan Valery | 1 | 0 | 0 | 1 |
| 3 | DF | (England) | 12 | Harry Amass | 1 | 0 | 0 | 1 |
| 3 | MF | (England) | 14 | Nathaniel Chalobah | 1 | 0 | 0 | 1 |
| 3 | FW | (England) | 17 | Charlie McNeill | 1 | 0 | 0 | 1 |
| 3 | FW | (Poland) | 19 | Olaf Kobacki | 0 | 0 | 1 | 1 |
| 3 | DF | (Republic of Ireland) | 22 | Gabriel Otegbayo | 1 | 0 | 0 | 1 |
| 3 | DF | (England) | 45 | Tayo Adaramola | 1 | 0 | 0 | 1 |
| Total | | | | | 15 | 0 | 1 | 16 |

=== Disciplinary record ===
| No. | Pos. | Player | Championship | | FA Cup | | EFL Cup | | Total | |
| No. | Pos. | Player | Yellow card | Red card | Yellow card | Red card | Yellow card | Red card | Yellow card | Red card |
|---|---|---|---|---|---|---|---|---|---|---|
| 1 | GK | Pierce Charles | 1 | 0 | 0 | 0 | 0 | 0 | 1 | 0 |
| 2 | DF | Liam Palmer | 4 | 0 | 0 | 0 | 0 | 0 | 4 | 0 |
| 3 | DF | Max Lowe | 4 | 0 | 0 | 0 | 0 | 0 | 4 | 0 |
| 4 | MF | Sean Fusire | 5 | 0 | 0 | 0 | 0 | 0 | 5 | 0 |
| 6 | DF | Dominic Iorfa | 6 | 0 | 0 | 0 | 0 | 0 | 6 | 0 |
| 7 | DF | Yan Valery | 3 | 0 | 0 | 0 | 0 | 0 | 3 | 0 |
| 8 | MF | Svante Ingelsson | 4 | 0 | 0 | 0 | 0 | 0 | 4 | 0 |
| 9 | FW | Jamal Lowe | 4 | 0 | 0 | 0 | 0 | 0 | 4 | 0 |
| 10 | MF | Barry Bannan | 6 | 1 | 0 | 0 | 0 | 0 | 6 | 1 |
| 11 | FW | Iké Ugbo | 1 | 0 | 0 | 0 | 0 | 0 | 1 | 0 |
| 12 | DF | Harry Amass | 2 | 0 | 0 | 0 | 0 | 0 | 2 | 0 |
| 12 | FW | Jerry Yates | 1 | 0 | 0 | 0 | 0 | 0 | 1 | 0 |
| 13 | GK | Joe Lumley | 1 | 0 | 0 | 0 | 0 | 0 | 1 | 0 |
| 14 | MF | Nathaniel Chalobah | 2 | 0 | 0 | 0 | 0 | 0 | 2 | 0 |
| 16 | DF | Liam Cooper | 3 | 0 | 0 | 0 | 0 | 0 | 3 | 0 |
| 17 | FW | Charlie McNeill | 3 | 0 | 0 | 0 | 0 | 0 | 3 | 0 |
| 18 | FW | Bailey Cadamarteri | 2 | 0 | 0 | 0 | 0 | 0 | 2 | 0 |
| 18 | MF | Marvelous Nakamba | 1 | 0 | 0 | 0 | 0 | 0 | 1 | 0 |
| 20 | MF | Rio Shipston | 0 | 0 | 0 | 0 | 1 | 0 | 1 | 0 |
| 22 | DF | Gabriel Otegbayo | 3 | 1 | 0 | 0 | 1 | 0 | 4 | 1 |
| 24 | MF | Jaden Heskey | 5 | 0 | 0 | 0 | 0 | 0 | 5 | 0 |
| 24 | GK | Ethan Horvath | 1 | 1 | 0 | 0 | 0 | 0 | 1 | 1 |
| 27 | DF | Reece Johnson | 1 | 0 | 0 | 0 | 1 | 0 | 2 | 0 |
| 28 | DF | Cole McGhee | 1 | 0 | 0 | 0 | 1 | 0 | 2 | 0 |
| 37 | MF | Jarvis Thornton | 2 | 0 | 0 | 0 | 1 | 0 | 3 | 0 |
| 40 | FW | Devlan Moses | 1 | 0 | 0 | 0 | 0 | 0 | 1 | 0 |
| 45 | DF | Tayo Adaramola | 2 | 0 | 0 | 0 | 0 | 0 | 2 | 0 |

=== Clean sheets ===
| No. | Nat. | Player | Matches played | Clean sheet % | Championship | FA Cup | EFL Cup | Total |
|---|---|---|---|---|---|---|---|---|
| 1 | (Northern Ireland) | Pierce Charles | 21 | 9.52% | 2 | 0 | 0 | 2 |
| 13 | (England) | Murphy Cooper | 8 | 0% | 0 | 0 | 0 | 0 |
| 13 | (England) | Joe Lumley | 2 | 0% | 0 | 0 | 0 | 0 |
| 24 | (United States) | Ethan Horvath | 16 | 12.5% | 2 | 0 | 0 | 2 |
| 25 | (Wales) | Logan Stretch | 1 | 0% | 0 | 0 | 0 | 0 |
| 33 | (Senegal) | Seny Dieng | 3 | 0% | 0 | 0 | 0 | 0 |

== Awards ==
=== Club awards ===
==== Club Player of the Month ====
Player of the Month awards for the 2025–26 season.

| Month | First | % | Second | % | Third | % | Ref |
|---|---|---|---|---|---|---|---|
| August | (Sweden) Svante Ingelsson | 51% | (Scotland) Barry Bannan | 14% | (England) Ernie Weaver | 11% | |
| September | (England) Ernie Weaver | 40% | (Scotland) Barry Bannan | 27% | (England) George Brown | 19% | |
| October | (Sweden) Svante Ingelsson | 23% | (England) Harry Amass | 20% | (Scotland) Barry Bannan | 12% | |
| November | (England) Harry Amass | 82% | (Scotland) Barry Bannan | 10% | (England) Charlie McNeill | 6% | |
| December | (England) Harry Amass | 27% | (Northern Ireland) Pierce Charles | 25% | (Sweden) Svante Ingelsson | 21% | |
| January | (England) Murphy Cooper | – | (Sweden) Svante Ingelsson | – | (Republic of Ireland) Gabriel Otegbayo | – | |
| February | (Sweden) Svante Ingelsson | – | (England) Charlie McNeill | – | (Republic of Ireland) Gabriel Otegbayo | – | |
| March | (England) Jerry Yates | 60% | (Sweden) Svante Ingelsson | – | (Jamaica) Jamal Lowe | – | |

==== Club Player of the Year ====
Player of the Year award for the 2025–26 season.

| Winner | Ref |
|---|---|
| (Sweden) Svante Ingelsson | |

=== Competition awards ===
==== Championship Player of the Month ====
| Month | Player | | Ref |
|---|---|---|---|
| September | (Scotland) Barry Bannan | Nomination | |

==== EFL Cup Goal of the Round ====
| Round | Player | Goal | | Ref |
|---|---|---|---|---|
| 1 | (Brazil) Gui Siqueira | 8' vs Bolton Wanderers, 13 August | Winner | |

=== Other awards ===
==== Rainbow Owls ====
| Award | First | % | Second | % | Third | % | Ref |
|---|---|---|---|---|---|---|---|
| Player of the Season | (Sweden) Svante Ingelsson | 71% | (Scotland) Liam Palmer | 14% | (England) Harry Amass | 10% | |
| Young Player of the Season | (Republic of Ireland) Gabriel Otegbayo | 24% | (Northern Ireland) Pierce Charles | 19% | (England) Jarvis Thornton | 19% | |

==== Sheffield Star Awards ====
| Award | Player | Ref. |
|---|---|---|
| Owls’ Player of the Year | (Sweden) Svante Ingelsson | |
| Outstanding Achievement award | (Scotland) Liam Palmer | |

==== Wise Old Owl Player of the Year ====
| Winner | Ref |
|---|---|
| Entire team | |
