= Gabriel Otegbayo =

Irish footballer (born 2004)

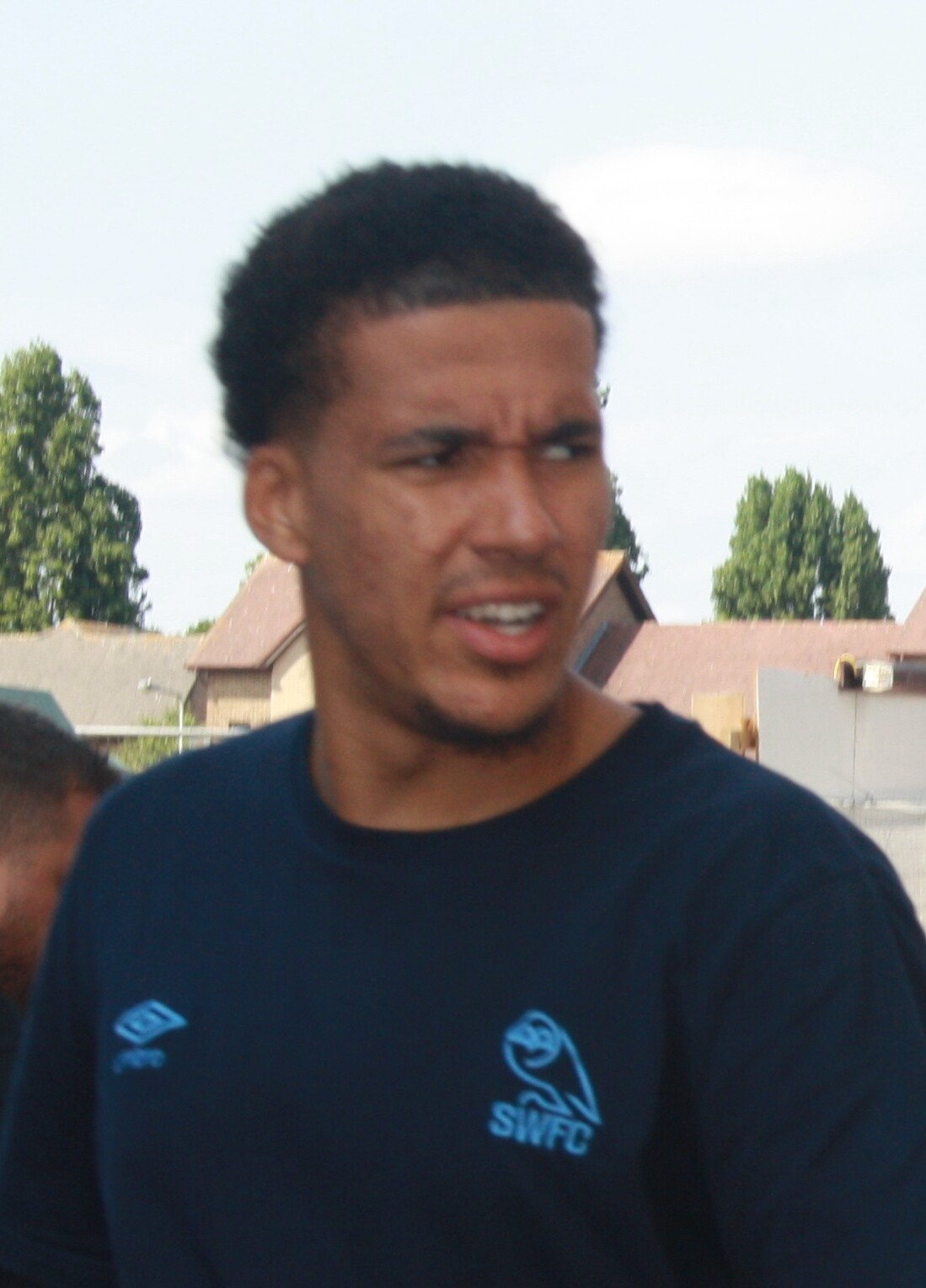
- Gabriel Otegbayo in 2026

Personal information
- Full name: Gabriel Algirdas Babatunde Otegbayo
- Date of birth: 11 February 2005 (age 21)
- Place of birth: Cork, Ireland
- Height: 6 ft 2 in (1.88 m)
- Position: Centre-back

Team information
- Current team: Sheffield Wednesday
- Number: 22

Youth career
- –2020: Ringmahon
- 2020–2022: Cobh Ramblers
- 2022–2023: Burnley

Senior career*
Years	Team	Apps	(Gls)
2024–	Sheffield Wednesday	56	(3)

International career^{‡}
2025	Republic of Ireland U21	2	(0)
- * Club domestic league appearances and goals as of 20:58, 11 November 2026 (UTC) ‡ National team caps and goals as of 00:14, 18 November 2026 (UTC)

Gabriel Algirdas Babatunde Otegbayo (born 11 February 2005) is an Irish professional footballer who plays as a centre-back for EFL League One club Sheffield Wednesday.

== Career ==
=== Early career ===
On 31 August 2022, Burnley confirmed the signing of Otegbayo following a successful trial period for this U18 side. He was the first youth player to be sold from Cobh Ramblers since Roy Keane.

=== Sheffield Wednesday ===
On 1 March 2024, Otegbayo signed his first professional contract with Sheffield Wednesday following a successful trial period. He signed a new contract at Wednesday at the end of that season. He made his professional debut, coming off the bench in the EFL Cup on 14 August 2024 against Hull City, helping the side win 2–1. He made his first professional start against Blackpool in the third round, helping his side to a 1–0 win before being replaced by Akin Famewo. On 5 November 2024, he made his Championship debut against Norwich City, replacing Dominic Iorfa, helping Wednesday to a 2–0 victory. He scored his first ever goal on 4 January 2025, scoring a late equalister against Millwall. On 3 February 2025, he signed a new contract with the club.

== International career ==
Born in Ireland, Otegbayo is of Nigerian descent. In November 2024, he received his first call up to the Republic of Ireland U21 squad for their two friendlies against Sweden U21 in Marbella, Spain. He was called up to the following squad, where he made his debut against Hungary U21, starting in a 3–1 win.

== Personal life ==
Otegbayo's brother, Raphael-Pijus, is also a footballer and plays for Stoke City.

== Career statistics ==
As of 11 November 2026

Appearances and goals by club, season and competition
Club	Season	League			FA Cup		League Cup		Other		Total	
Club	Season	Division	Apps	Goals	Apps	Goals	Apps	Goals	Apps	Goals	Apps	Goals
Sheffield Wednesday	2024–25	Championship	11	1	1	0	3	0	–		15	1
Sheffield Wednesday	2025–26	Championship	35	1	1	0	2	0	–		38	1
Sheffield Wednesday	2026–27	League One	10	1	0	0	2	0	3 (Note: Appearance(s) in EFL Trophy)	0	15	1
Career total			56	3	2	0	7	0	3	0	68	3
