= Devlan Moses =

Northern Irish footballer

Personal information
- Full name: Devlan Geo Moses
- Date of birth: 26 September 2005 (age 21)
- Place of birth: Huddersfield, England
- Height: 5 ft 11 in (1.80 m)
- Position: Centre forward

Team information
- Current team: Buxton (on loan from Sheffield Wednesday)
- Number: 19

Youth career
- –2016: Huddersfield Town
- 2016–2026: Sheffield Wednesday

Senior career*
Years	Team	Apps	(Gls)
2026–	Sheffield Wednesday	8	(0)
2026–	→ Buxton (loan)	9	(3)

International career^{‡}
2023	Northern Ireland U19	3	(1)
2026–	Northern Ireland U21	4	(1)
- * Club domestic league appearances and goals as of 17:08, 14 November 2026 (UTC) ‡ National team caps and goals as of 08:22, 27 September 2026 (UTC)

Devlan Geo Moses (born 26 September 2005) is a professional footballer who plays as a centre forward for National League North club Buxton on loan from for EFL League One side Sheffield Wednesday. Born in England, he represents Northern Ireland at youth international level.

== Club career ==
Moses moved to Sheffield Wednesday from Huddersfield Town at 11 years old and moved up the youth ranks. He signed his first professional contract in July 2024. After 15 goals and six assists from 14 starts for Sheffield Wednesday U21s, he picked up an injury ahead of the following season which would require surgery. He made the first team squad for the first time against Hull City on Boxing Day 2025. He made his senior debut away to Queens Park Rangers, replacing Charlie McNeill in a 0–3 defeat. Following the end of the 2025–26 season, the club confirmed that they had offered him a new contract, which was confirmed in August, with him signing a new one-year contract until 2027, with a club option of an additional year.

On 5 September 2026, Moses joined National League North club Buxton on loan until 5 December 2026. He made his debut the same day, starting in a 0–4 defeat to Morecambe. The following week, he scored his first goal, a penalty, in a 3–1 win against Chester.

== International career ==
He was called up to Northern Ireland U19 for the first time in September 2023 by new manager Gareth McAuley. He got his first Northern Ireland U21 call up in March 2026 having broken into the Sheffield Wednesday senior team, as well as scoring 10 goals in 6 U21 games for his club side.

== Career statistics ==
As of 14 November 2026

Club	Season	League			FA Cup		EFL Cup		Other		Total	
Club	Season	Division	Apps	Goals	Apps	Goals	Apps	Goals	Apps	Goals	Apps	Goals
Sheffield Wednesday	2025–26	Championship	8	0	1	0	0	0	0	0	9	0
Sheffield Wednesday	2026–27	League One	0	0	0	0	1	0	0	0	1	0
Sheffield Wednesday	Total		8	0	1	0	1	0	0	0	10	0
Buxton (loan)	2026–27	National League North	9	3	1	1	—		1 (Note: Appearance(s) in FA Trophy)	0	11	4
Career total			17	3	2	1	1	0	1	0	21	4
