= Wales High School =

Academy in South Yorkshire, England

Location
- Storth Lane; Kiveton Park; Rotherham, South Yorkshire, S26 5QQ; England; 53.343519°N 1.273749°W

Information
- Type: Academy
- Motto: Humble et Loyal
- Established: 1970
- Local authority: Rotherham
- Department for Education URN: 136331 Tables
- Ofsted: Reports
- Chair of Governors: Dominic Beck
- Headteacher: Lisa McCall
- Gender: Co-educational
- Age: 11 to 19
- Enrolment: 1,600, 350 of whom in 6th form (2011)
- Houses: Busli, Mortain, Rollo and Warenne
- Colours: Blue, Yellow and Grey
- Parents' Association: 'Friends of Wales High School'
- Adopted Charities: Barnardo's Bluebell Wood Hospice
- Website: https://www.waleshigh.com

Wales High School is an academy school for 11- to 19-year-olds, in Kiveton, near Rotherham, South Yorkshire, England.

Opened in 1970, the school provides education for nearby villages, including Kiveton Park, Harthill, Todwick, Wales, Thurcroft and South Anston. The school is situated in Kiveton Park, not in the small neighbouring village of Wales less than a mile away.

The school was invited to become an academy under new government policy in 2012.

== Ofsted inspections ==
Since the commencement of Ofsted inspections in September 1993, the school has undergone six inspections:

Date of inspection	Outcome	Reference
26–30 November 2001	Good	Report
18–19 October 2006	Outstanding	Report
7–8 November 2012	Requires improvement	Report
8–9 April 2014	Good	Report
2 May 2018	Good	Report
10 October 2023	Good	

== Headteachers ==
Since the school opened in 1970, the headteachers have been:

- Mr Phillip Timothy, September 1970–December 1989
- Mr Lawrence Morton, January 1990–December 2007
- Mr John Day, January 2008–August 2012
- Mr Giuseppe Di'Iasio, September 2012–April 2024
- Miss Lisa McCall - April 2024 – Present

== Traditions ==
- Sponsored walk: every four years the school holds a sponsored walk with the intention of raising money for the school. Previous walks have contributed to the ongoing improvement of the school environment.
- Full school formal assemblies: known as the 'Full School Squash' by pupils and staff, take place four times a year, at Easter, and Christmas, and at the beginning and end of the school year at which the school bell is rung by the youngest pupil/s. Every member of the school is expected to attend. At assemblies special guests are invited, news is given, certificates and awards are presented, and musical items often performed.
- Houses and the Dragon: Busli (Blue), Mortain (Black), Rollo (White) and Warenne (Yellow). Busli is named after Roger de Busli and Warenne after William de Warenne, two of William the Conqueror's knights, Mortain after his half-brother, and Rollo was one of his ancestors. Each pupil is assigned a house when joining the school. Pupils are provided with sports kit in their specific house colours, to be worn in P.E. lessons and house sporting events. Houses compete in events such as football, rugby, tennis, cross country and netball, and non-sporting activities such as chess, drama and art. At the end of the year, the house with the most points is awarded the 'Dragon', a golden dragon statue in a glass case. The dragon is engraved with the year and winning house.
- Rivalry: Historically, Wales High School has had a rivalry with the nearby Dinnington High School, particularly in sport.

== Notable alumni ==
- Dean Downing – racing cyclist, former British National Circuit Race (2002 and 2008) and British National Madison Champion (2003).
- Edward Hogg – English actor
- James Toseland - World Superbike motorcycle racer and world champion in 2004 and 2007.
- Ryan Sampson – TV actor in a 2008 Doctor Who two-part story, ITV's Roman comedy Plebs & the Sky Max original Brassic
- Self Esteem – English musician and actor
