= Jarvis Thornton =

English footballer (born 2006)

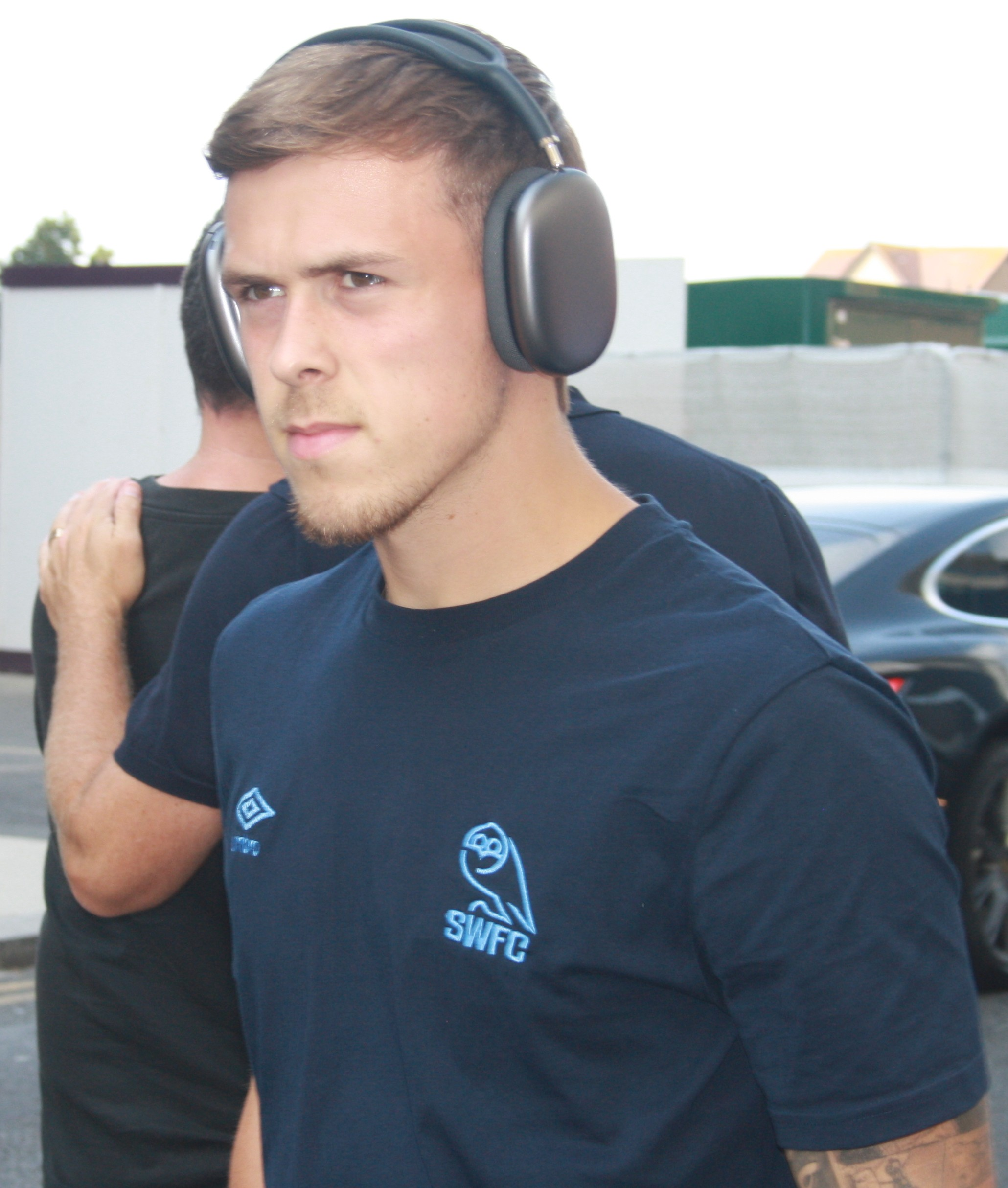
- Thornton in 2026

Personal information
- Full name: Jarvis Harry Thornton
- Date of birth: 10 January 2006 (age 20)
- Place of birth: Barnsley, England
- Height: 5 ft 10 in (1.77 m)
- Position: Centre midfielder

Team information
- Current team: Sheffield Wednesday
- Number: 37

Youth career
- Hoyland Town Magpies
- 2015–2025: Sheffield Wednesday

Senior career*
Years	Team	Apps	(Gls)
2025–	Sheffield Wednesday	25	(0)
- * Club domestic league appearances and goals as of 21:01, 11 November 2026 (UTC)

Jarvis Harry Thornton (born 10 January 2006) is an English professional footballer who plays as a midfielder for EFL League One side Sheffield Wednesday.

== Early life ==
He went to school at Kirk Balk Academy in Barnsley.

== Club career ==
=== Sheffield Wednesday ===
Thornton joined Sheffield Wednesday at U8s level from his local side Hoyland Town Magpies, moving up the ranks and captaining the U18s team. He signed his first professional contract with the club on 3 July 2024, joining the first team ahead of the 2025–26 season. On 13 August 2025, Thornton made his professional debut in the EFL Cup against Bolton Wanderers. He made his senior league debut, coming on as a substitute in a 0–5 defeat against Coventry City, with his first match as a starter on 26 December 2025, in a 2–2 draw against Hull City.

He signed a new two-year contract on 3 August 2026, keeping him at the club until the summer of 2028.

== Career statistics ==
As of 11 November 2026

Club	Season	League			FA Cup		EFL Cup		Other		Total	
Club	Season	Division	Apps	Goals	Apps	Goals	Apps	Goals	Apps	Goals	Apps	Goals
Sheffield Wednesday	2025–26	Championship	23	0	1	0	3	0	—		27	0
Sheffield Wednesday	2026–27	League One	2	0	0	0	2	0	3 (Note: Appearance(s) in EFL Trophy)	0	7	0
Career total			25	0	1	0	5	0	3	0	34	0
