= Barry Bannan =

Scottish footballer (born 1989)

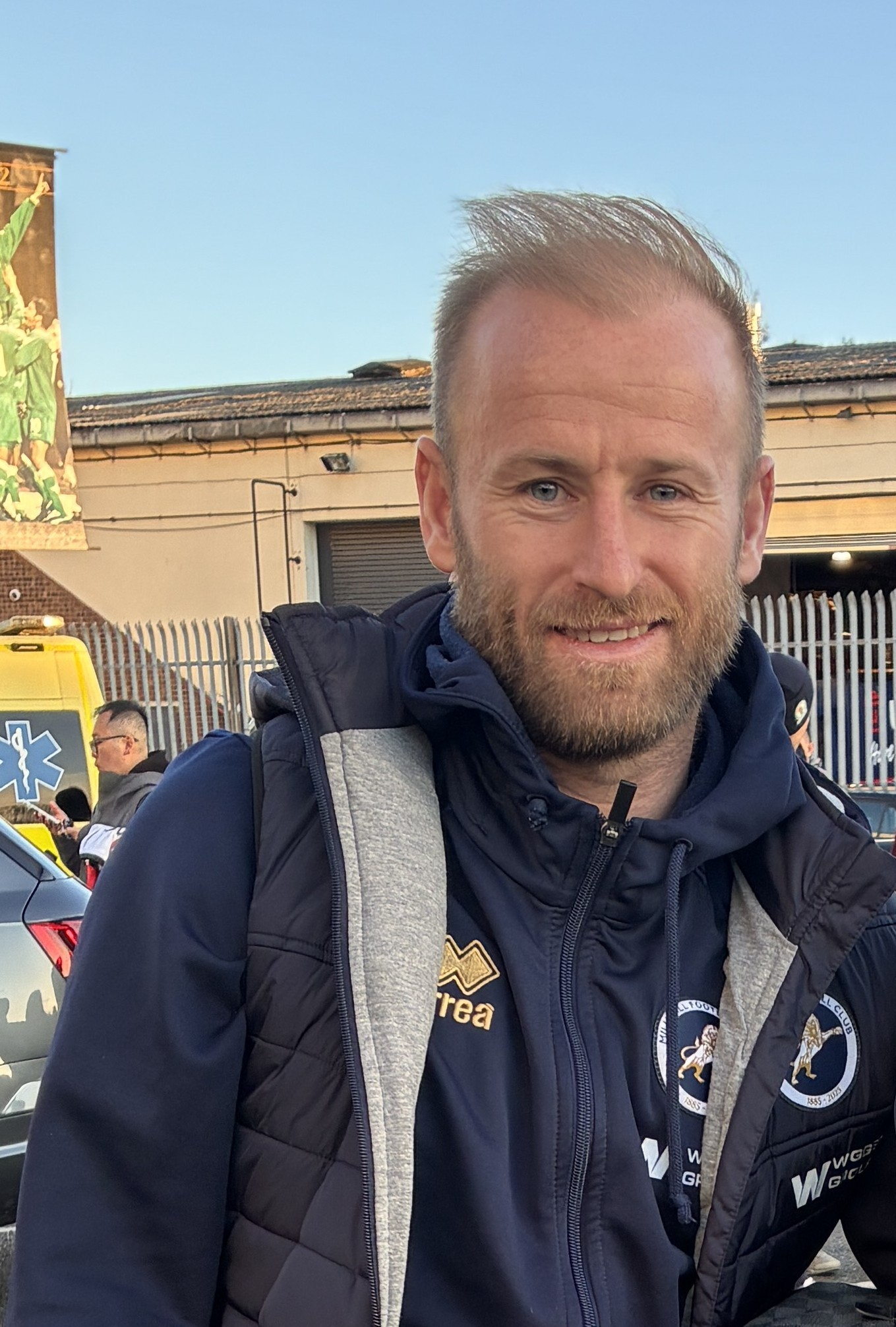
- Bannan in 2026

Personal information
- Full name: Barry Ryan Bannan
- Date of birth: 1 December 1989 (age 36)
- Place of birth: Airdrie, Scotland
- Height: 5 ft 7 in (1.69 m)
- Position: Central midfielder

Team information
- Current team: Sheffield Wednesday
- Number: 10

Youth career
- –1999: Lenzie Youth Club
- 1999–2002: Albion Rovers
- 2002–2004: Celtic
- 2004–2008: Aston Villa

Senior career*
Years	Team	Apps	(Gls)
2008–2013	Aston Villa	64	(1)
2009	→ Derby County (loan)	10	(1)
2009–2010	→ Blackpool (loan)	20	(1)
2011	→ Leeds United (loan)	7	(0)
2013–2015	Crystal Palace	22	(1)
2015	→ Bolton Wanderers (loan)	16	(0)
2015–2026	Sheffield Wednesday	435	(35)
2026	Millwall	14	(0)
2026–	Sheffield Wednesday	15	(1)

International career
2009–2010	Scotland U21	10	(1)
2009	Scotland B	1	(0)
2010–2017	Scotland	27	(0)
- * Club domestic league appearances and goals as of 21:59, 20 November 2026 (UTC)

Barry Ryan Bannan (born 1 December 1989) is a Scottish professional footballer who plays as a central midfielder for EFL League One club Sheffield Wednesday.

Bannan began his career at Albion Rovers before moving to the Celtic Academy and later the Aston Villa Academy. After four years in their youth and reserve sides he made his senior debut for Aston Villa in 2008, and was subsequently loaned to Derby County, Blackpool and Leeds United in the Championship to gain experience. In 2013, he signed for Crystal Palace for an undisclosed fee, and after a brief loan to Bolton Wanderers, moved on to Sheffield Wednesday. A full international since 2010, Bannan has earned 27 caps for Scotland.

== Club career ==
=== Early years ===
Born in Airdrie, Bannan began playing at local youth team Lenzie Youth Club. In 1999, as a nine-year-old ball boy for Albion Rovers, he came to prominence during a match against Montrose, when after fetching the ball, he began juggling it and then flicked it over the head of a Montrose player running towards him. The bit of skill sent the crowd wild and Albion Rovers chairman Davie Shanks was impressed, saying "He's the best player out there".

Bannan joined Celtic's youth academy in 2002; he was 14 when he chose to accept a trial offer from Aston Villa. While on trial at the Academy of the English club, he took part in the Ergenzingen Tournament in Germany. The Villa youth outfit won the tournament courtesy of a 1–0 final victory over FSV Mainz, with Bannan being named player of the tournament. Shortly after, the young Scot was offered a two-year contract with the club.

=== Aston Villa ===
==== Early years ====
In the 2007–08 season, he scored 13 goals in 32 matches for Villa's academy team as they won the Premier Academy league title, as well as playing for the reserve team as they won the Premier Reserve League South. Following the season's end he signed a two-year professional contract with the club.

In November 2008, Bannan was named "Young Player of the Month" by local radio station BBC Radio WM, the first Villa player to win the award twice. His first team debut came on 17 December, as a 61st-minute substitute for Craig Gardner in a 1–3 UEFA Cup group stage defeat to German side Hamburger SV at the Volksparkstadion, and made his full début in the same competition's Round of 32, a 0–2 defeat away to Russian Premier League side CSKA Moscow on 26 February 2009.

==== Loans ====
Bannan joined Championship side Derby County on loan for one month in March 2009. He scored on his Rams debut, his first competitive league goal, in a 2–4 defeat to Sheffield United at Bramall Lane and his loan was extended to the end of the season, making a total of ten appearances and scoring once. Bannan was able to return to the Aston Villa reserve side that were champions of the Premier Reserve League South, and played in their 3–1 win over Premier Reserve League North winners Sunderland reserves in the play-off final.

In November 2009, Bannan joined Championship side Blackpool on loan, making his debut as an 87th-minute substitute in the 1–1 West Lancashire derby with Preston North End at Bloomfield Road.

His full debut came in a 3–0 win away to Middlesbrough on 8 December. In January 2010 the loan was extended to the end of the season, and two days later Bannan scored his first goal for the club, with a 30-yard lob, in a 1–1 draw away to Coventry City.

In February 2010, Bannan was one of three players, along with Ishmel Demontagnac and Neal Eardley, disciplined by Ian Holloway, when they were seen out at a nightclub two days previously in Blackpool following the home defeat to Leicester City. Bannan came on for the final two minutes at Wembley as Blackpool won the Championship play-off final against Cardiff City and secured promotion to the Premier League.

==== Later years ====
Bannan returned to Villa for the 2010–11 season, and made his Premier League debut on the opening day of the season, coming on as an 89th-minute substitute against West Ham United. He scored his first goal for Villa in a Europa league qualifier against Rapid Vienna.

On 6 November, Bannan was handed his first start of the season against Fulham and started the following two games against Blackpool and Manchester United. He was given a run of games in the first team by manager Gérard Houllier due to the absence of many first-team players through injury. On 7 March 2011, Bannan joined Leeds United on loan until the end of the 2010–11 season. Bannan made his Leeds debut as a second-half substitute against Preston North End. He made his home debut at Elland Road on 12 March as a second-half substitute against Ipswich Town. Bannan was recalled from his loan spell at Leeds on 28 April 2011.

Bannan scored his first goal in the Premier League for Villa with a 57th-minute penalty against Queens Park Rangers at Loftus Road on 25 September 2011. Towards the end of the 2012–13 season, Bannan found his first team opportunities limited and a move away from the club looked increasingly likely. On 26 July 2013, Blackburn Rovers were reported to have tabled a bid of £750,000 to sign Bannan from Villa. However the move failed to materialise as terms could not be agreed with Bannan's representatives.

=== Crystal Palace ===
Bannan signed a three-year contract with Crystal Palace on 2 September 2013, for an undisclosed fee. He was signed by Ian Holloway, with whom he had worked at Blackpool. Bannan's first Palace goal in the Premier League was on 23 November, the only goal in a 0–1 away win at Hull City.

On 2 February 2015, transfer deadline day, Bannan joined Championship club Bolton Wanderers on loan for the duration of the season as part of the deal that saw Lee Chung-yong join Crystal Palace. In total, he made sixteen appearances while at the Macron Stadium.

=== Sheffield Wednesday ===
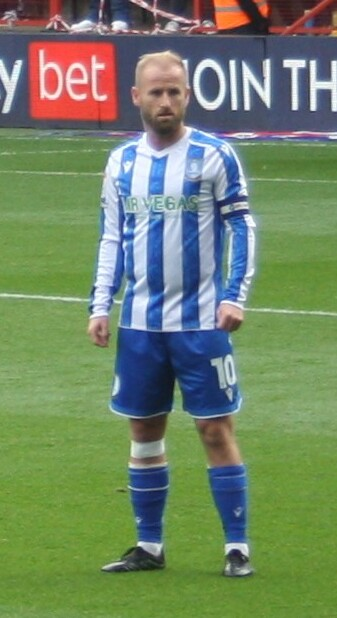
Bannan playing for Sheffield Wednesday in 2025

On 31 August 2015, Bannan signed a one-year deal with Sheffield Wednesday for an undisclosed fee. He made his debut for the Owls on 12 September, starting in a 3–1 defeat at Burnley. He scored his first goal for Wednesday on 12 December 2015, the equaliser as they earned a 2–2 draw away to Cardiff City.

The following January, he opened the scoring in a 2–1 win over Fulham in the third round of the FA Cup, scoring a 25-yard half volley. Five days later, he was given a new three-and-a-half-year contract. In April, he was listed in the Championship's PFA Team of the Year.

At the start of the 2020–21 season, Bannan was made captain of Wednesday, replacing Tom Lees. In February 2021, it was revealed that a new contract had been agreed 'in principle' for him to extend his stay at the club and this would be confirmed by the club, with him signing a contract until the summer of 2023. He was voted the club's player of the season for the 2020–21 season, starting every game during the campaign.

In the 2021–22 season Bannan would be nominated for the February EFL League One Player of the Month award by the EFL, as he either scored or assisted a goal in five of Wednesday's six fixtures. The following month of March he would score three more goals and add two more assists for the season, winning the club's player of the month and the League One Player of the Month after being nominated for the second successive month by the EFL. This performance would see Bannan nominated for the Sky Bet League One Player of the Season, being included into the Team of the Season and award him the EFL Goal of the Season for his strike against MK Dons. Following the end of the season, he would win the club's Player of the Season award, finishing the campaign with 49 appearances in all competitions, contributing nine goals and 12 assists.

The following 2022–23 season, he would win the clubs player of the month and be nominated for the EFL October player of the month after two goals and two assists. Manager Darren Moore confirmed on 24 March 2023 that he had recently triggered an extension to his contract for another season. He was nominated for EFL League One Player of the Season alongside Aaron Collins and Jonson Clarke-Harris. Missing out on the main award, he was nominated in EFL Team of the Season for a second year running.

He was awarded the Wise Old Owl Award for the 2023–24 season, the second time he has won the award. He made his 400th appearance for the club, in a 3–1 win against Blackburn Rovers on 21 April 2024. Following the end of the 2023–24 season, the club had offered Bannan a new contract which was signed on 31 May 2024.

The following 2024–25 season, he would win the clubs player of the month and be nominated for the Championship player of the month for September, registering two goals against QPR and Luton, before notching a vital assist at home against WBA, his 100th goal contribution. The goal against QPR was also nominated for the Championship goal of the month award. After the win against Oxford United in December, he moved into the clubs top 10 all-time appearance makers, replacing Teddy Davison and Ernest Blenkinsop. He would win another goal of the month nomination, this time for his goal against Derby County on 1 December 2024. He was offered a new contract following the end of the 2024–25 season.

After a summer of turmoil at Sheffield Wednesday, Bannan was subject to much speculation, but he penned his new contract at the club on the 2 August 2025. He was sent off on the opening day of the season, against Leicester City, with Wednesday drawing 1–1 at the time, but they eventually lost 2–1. He would retain his form in September, where a goal against Portsmouth and two assists would see him given a nomination for Championship player of the month. In January, Bannan after ten and a half seasons at Sheffield Wednesday, told team-mates that the upcoming match against Bristol City would be his last for the club, with manager Henrik Pedersen confirming after the game that he had asked to leave following uncertainty of his future at the club, with the club still in administration.

=== Millwall ===
On 28 January 2026, Bannan signed an 18-month contract with fellow Championship club Millwall after 477 appearances with Sheffield Wednesday.

=== Return to Sheffield Wednesday ===
On 9 July 2026, Bannan signed a 12-month contract to return to Sheffield Wednesday just six months after leaving, following the takeover from Arise Capital Partners. He made his second debut against Bolton Wanderers in the EFL Cup, starting and gaining an assist in a 1–0 win. His first goal on his return was against Sunderland U21 in the EFL Trophy, putting Wednesday 2–0 ahead. His first league goal came against AFC Wimbledon in October, scoring the first in a 5–0 victory.

== International career ==
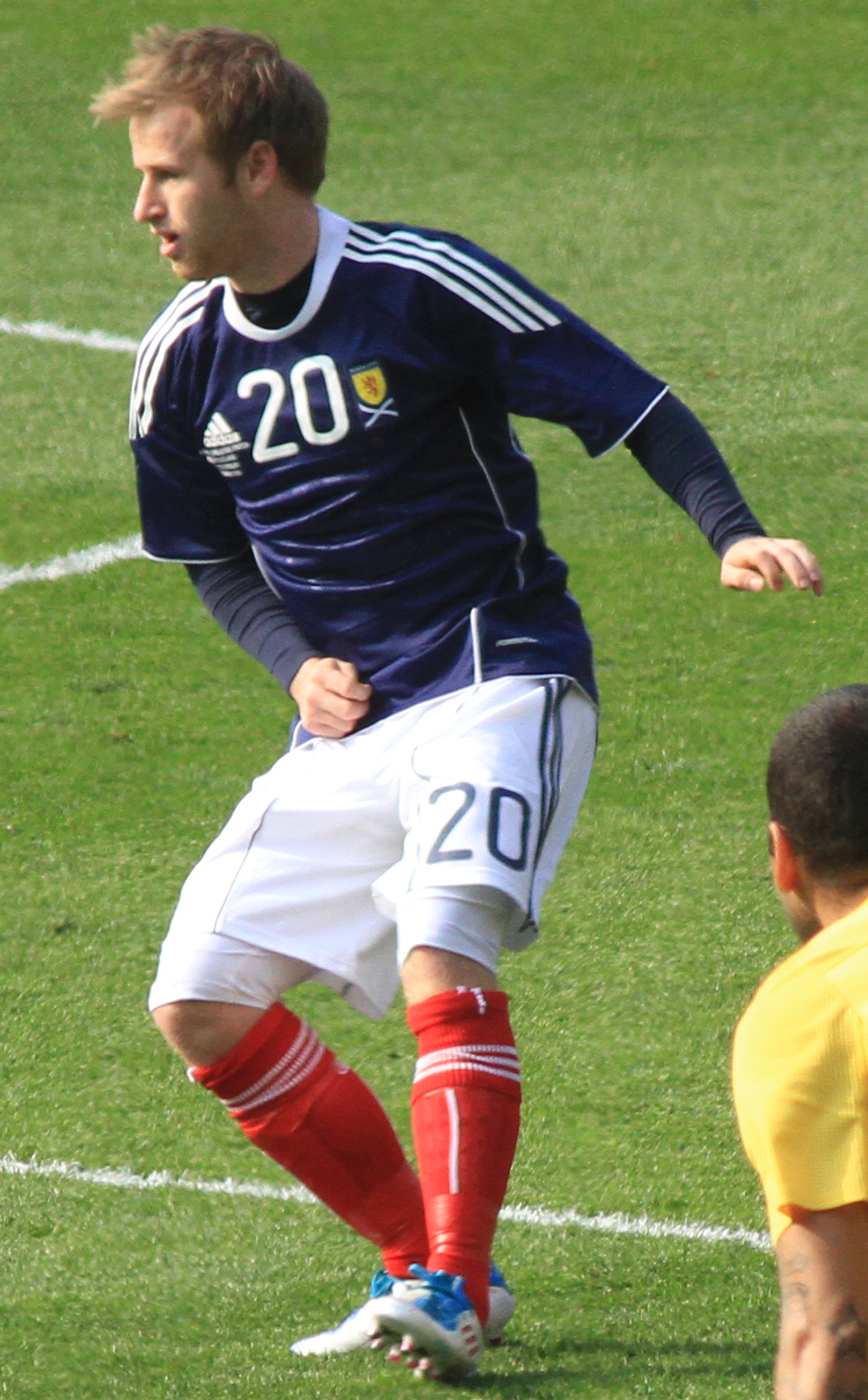
Bannan with Scotland in 2011

Bannan played for the Scotland under-21 team in their first five games of the 2011 UEFA Under-21 qualification campaign. He made his début in a 1–0 victory over Albania on 28 March 2009. On 15 November 2009 he helped the under-21s beat Azerbaijan 4–0 at the Tofik Bakhramov Stadium in Baku. Bannan scored his first goal for the under 21s in a win against Austria that earned qualification for the play-offs.

He also has one B cap, earned in a 3–0 win over Northern Ireland B on 6 May 2009. On 11 November 2010, Bannan received his first call up to the senior squad for the friendly against Faroe Islands.

Bannan made his debut for the Scotland national team against Faroe Islands on 16 November 2010. Bannan's performance prompted manager Craig Levein to call him a future star of Scottish football.

Bannan was then called up to the Scotland squad to face Brazil in March 2011. Bannan made his first competitive start for Scotland in Euro 2012 qualifier against Lithuania in September 2011. He was named man-of-the-match and got a standing ovation from the Hampden Park crowd after setting up the winning goal.

== Playing style ==
Bannan is primarily a central midfielder but also can play as a winger. He is particularly useful with his left foot.

Aston Villa manager Gérard Houllier likened Bannan to Barcelona midfielders Xavi and Andrés Iniesta, saying "He is an intelligent player, he can read the game well and adapt well. I don't think Xavi and Iniesta, who are outstanding players, are of huge size. They are intelligent, they have the skill, they have the desire – young Barry has all of that." Ian Holloway, who Bannan played under during his time at Blackpool, described him as "a beautiful footballer, absolutely lovely to watch".

Bannan's height and playing style have also led to Scotland teammate Darren Fletcher comparing him to the likes of Xavi, Iniesta and Paul Scholes. The former Manchester United midfielder stated that Bannan "is in the mould of the best midfielders in the world", and said "I'm talking about Xavi, Iniesta and Paul Scholes".

In December 2010, Houllier was again full of praise for him. He said "Xavi, Iniesta, Messi, Pedro. You can watch and wonder if they are playing in the youth team sometimes. They have fast technique and young Barry has all of that." Houllier then defended Bannan's size, and insisted it won't hold him back. Houllier said "The Premier League has got more physical but it is not about a matter of size. Obviously you need size in some positions but it's also a matter of commitment and physical commitment. Barry is competitive."

Bannan, however, claimed that former Aston Villa boss Martin O'Neill had doubts over his ability due to his size.

== Personal life ==
Bannan was born in Airdrie, North Lanarkshire, to James and Kathleen Bannan, who now live in Coatbridge. Bannan's grandfather, Tommy, was also a professional footballer, who scored over 100 times for Wrexham during the 1950s.

By the time he had reached the age of seven, Bannan had undergone four operations. The first was for a hernia; two more followed for a blocked tube into his kidney; and the fourth was for the removal of his appendix.

Bannan supports his former team, Celtic and his boyhood hero is midfielder Stiliyan Petrov, with whom he played at Aston Villa.

== Career statistics ==
=== Club ===
As of 20 November 2026

Appearances and goals by club, season and competition
Club	Season	League			FA Cup		League Cup		Other		Total	
Club	Season	Division	Apps	Goals	Apps	Goals	Apps	Goals	Apps	Goals	Apps	Goals
Aston Villa	2008–09	Premier League	0	0	0	0	0	0	2 (Note: Appearances in UEFA Cup)	0	2	0
Aston Villa	2009–10	Premier League	0	0	0	0	0	0	0	0	0	0
Aston Villa	2010–11	Premier League	12	0	3	0	3	0	1 (Note: Appearance in UEFA Europa League)	1	19	1
Aston Villa	2011–12	Premier League	28	1	2	0	2	0	—		32	1
Aston Villa	2012–13	Premier League	24	0	2	0	4	0	—		30	0
Aston Villa	Total		64	1	7	0	9	0	3	1	83	2
Derby County (loan)	2008–09	Championship	10	1	—		—		—		10	1
Blackpool (loan)	2009–10	Championship	20	1	—		—		2 (Note: Appearances in Championship play-offs)	0	22	1
Leeds United (loan)	2010–11	Championship	7	0	—		—		—		7	0
Crystal Palace	2013–14	Premier League	15	1	2	0	0	0	—		17	1
Crystal Palace	2014–15	Premier League	7	0	1	0	2	0	—		10	0
Crystal Palace	Total		22	1	3	0	2	0	0	0	27	1
Bolton Wanderers (loan)	2014–15	Championship	16	0	—		—		—		16	0
Sheffield Wednesday	2015–16	Championship	35	2	1	1	2	0	3	0	41	3
Sheffield Wednesday	2016–17	Championship	43	1	1	0	0	0	2	0	46	1
Sheffield Wednesday	2017–18	Championship	29	0	0	0	2	1	—		31	1
Sheffield Wednesday	2018–19	Championship	41	4	3	0	1	0	—		45	4
Sheffield Wednesday	2019–20	Championship	44	2	1	0	1	0	—		46	2
Sheffield Wednesday	2020–21	Championship	46	2	2	0	1	0	—		49	2
Sheffield Wednesday	2021–22	League One	45	9	2	0	1	0	3 (Note: One appearance in EFL Trophy, two appearances in League One play-offs)	0	51	9
Sheffield Wednesday	2022–23	League One	41	7	2	0	1	0	4 (Note: One appearance in EFL Trophy, three appearances in League One play-offs)	0	48	7
Sheffield Wednesday	2023–24	Championship	42	1	1	0	2	0	—		45	1
Sheffield Wednesday	2024–25	Championship	41	4	1	0	3	0	—		45	4
Sheffield Wednesday	2025–26	Championship	28	3	0	0	2	0	—		30	3
Sheffield Wednesday	Total		435	35	14	1	16	1	12	0	477	37
Millwall	2025–26	Championship	14	0	—		—		2	0	16	0
Sheffield Wednesday	2026–27	League One	15	1	1	0	2	0	1 (Note: One appearance and one goal in EFL Trophy)	1	19	2
Career total			604	40	25	1	29	1	19	1	677	43

=== International ===
Appearances and goals by national team and year
National team	Year	Apps	Goals
Scotland	2010	1	0
Scotland	2011	8	0
Scotland	2012	2	0
Scotland	2013	5	0
Scotland	2014	3	0
Scotland	2015	1	0
Scotland	2016	4	0
Scotland	2017	3	0
Total		27	0

== Honours ==
Blackpool

- Football League Championship play-offs: 2010

Sheffield Wednesday

- EFL League One play-offs: 2023

Individual

- PFA Team of the Year: 2015–16 Championship, 2021–22 League One, 2022–23 League One
- Sheffield Wednesday Player of the Year: 2020–21
- SWFC Community Player of the Year: 2020–21
- EFL League One Player of the Month: March 2022
- EFL Goal of the Season: 2021–22
- EFL League One Team of the Season: 2021–22, 2022–23
