= Cameron Dawson =

English association footballer (born 1995)

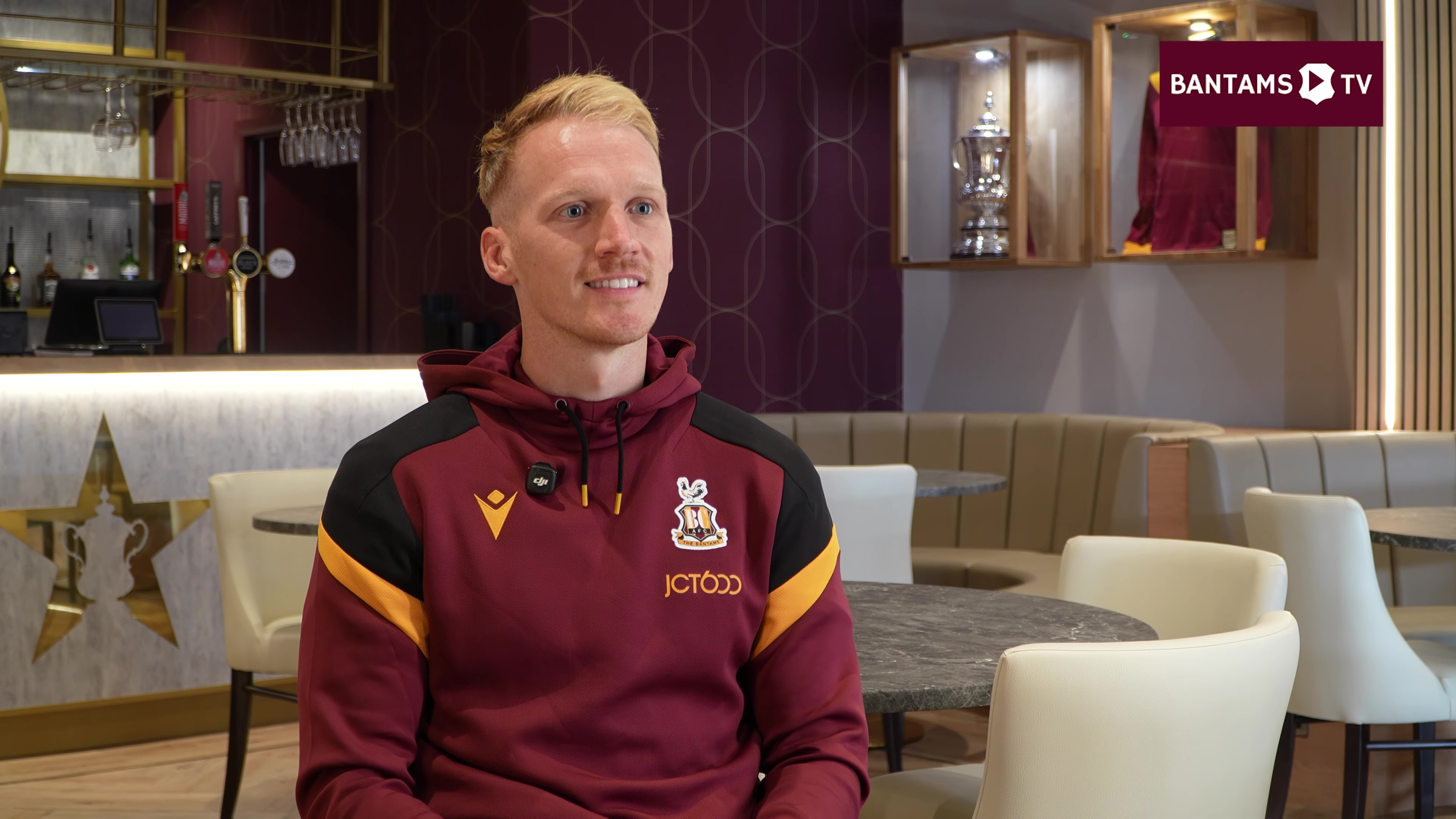
- Dawson with Bradford City in 2026

Personal information
- Full name: Cameron Miles Dawson
- Date of birth: 7 July 1995 (age 31)
- Place of birth: Sheffield, England
- Height: 1.93 m (6 ft 4 in)
- Position: Goalkeeper

Team information
- Current team: Bradford City
- Number: 1

Youth career
- –2013: Sheffield Wednesday

Senior career*
Years	Team	Apps	(Gls)
2013–2024	Sheffield Wednesday	105	(0)
2014	→ Plymouth Argyle (loan)	0	(0)
2014	→ Alfreton Town (loan)	17	(0)
2016	→ Wycombe Wanderers (loan)	1	(0)
2017	→ Chesterfield (loan)	2	(0)
2021–2022	→ Exeter City (loan)	45	(0)
2024–2026	Rotherham United	45	(0)
2026–	Bradford City	1	(0)

International career
2012	England U18	2	(0)
2013	England U19	3	(0)
- * Club domestic league appearances and goals as of 4 October 2026 (UTC)

Cameron Miles Dawson (born 7 July 1995) is an English professional footballer who plays as a goalkeeper for EFL League One club Bradford City.

== Club career ==
=== Sheffield Wednesday ===
Born in Sheffield, England, Dawson started his football career at Sheffield Wednesday, his boyhood club, when he first joined the club at age fifteen. Dawson signed his first professional contract for Sheffield Wednesday in April 2013. Following the absence of second choice goalkeeper, Adam Davies, he was named in the substitute bench for a match against Yeovil Town on 14 September 2013. Dawson went on to appear in the next four matches as an unused substitute. In August 2015, Dawson signed a new two-year contract keeping him at Sheffield Wednesday until the summer of 2017.

After his loan spell at Wycombe Wanderers ended, Dawson started his 2016–17 season on the substitute bench for three matches. But following an injury of Keiren Westwood against Brighton & Hove Albion on 1 October 2016, he came on as a second-half substitute to make his Sheffield Wednesday's debut and conceded a goal from Anthony Knockaert, as they lost 2–1. After returning to the substitute bench in a follow–up match against Huddersfield Town, Dawson came on as a 33rd-minute substitute following Westwood's injury against Cardiff City, played the rest of the match, as the club drew 1–1. He then started in the next two matches, including a clean sheet against Queens Park Rangers on 22 October 2016. His performance was praised by Manager Carlos Carvalhal, saying: "Cameron did well. We are happy with him and all of our goalkeepers." But Westwood returned from injury and reclaim his place as Sheffield Wednesday's first choice goalkeeper, resulting in Dawson returning to the substitute bench for the rest of the season. At the end of the 2016–17 season, he made four appearances in all competitions. Following this, the club opted to take up their option of a contract extension that would ensure Dawson remained under contract for the 2017–18 season. Dawson signed a three–year contract with the club, keeping him until 2020.

At the start of the 2017–18 season, Dawson continued remain sidelined out of the first team by being placed on the substitute bench, as well as, being assigned to the reserve team. Following his loan spell at Chesterfield ended, he made his first appearance of the season, starting the whole game, in a 2–0 win against Carlisle United in the third round replay of the FA Cup. Dawson then featured in the club's next three FA Cup matches, where they eventually lost 2–0 against Swansea City in the third round replay of the FA Cup. Manager Jos Luhukay gave him his first league start of the season, which came on 21 April 2018 against Reading and helped Sheffield Wednesday keep a clean sheet, as they won 3–0. He then played the remaining two league matches of the season, including earning another clean sheet against Wolverhampton Wanderers on 28 April 2018. At the end of the 2017–18 season, Dawson said: "It's good to gain experience and play as many games as possible. In the Cup games I thought I had done pretty well and deserved that chance in the league at some point. It came a couple of games, and for me it was about taking that chance and being in the manager's thoughts.I didn't have too much to do against Reading. I was watching the game, like everyone else, for the 90 minutes. Wolves was a great game to play in, I really enjoyed it. To play in that party atmosphere, in front of 30,000 fans, was great experience."

At the start of the 2018–19 season, Sheffield Wednesday boss Jos Luhukay chose Cameron Dawson as Wednesday's number one for the 2018–19 season and dropped former number one Keiren Westwood to the number three spot. After losing 2–0 against Brentford on 19 August 2018, Sheffield Star praised his performance, saying: "The goalkeeper's handling wasn't always the most assured but he made several key saves as Sheffield Wednesday folded under Brentford's attacking bombardment in the second half. Without him, the scoreline would have been much worse. He could do nothing about either goal." Despite this, Dawson continued to remain as the club's first choice goalkeeper for the rest of the year. He commented on his own form, saying: "I have been relatively happy. I have been pretty solid and tried to play in a certain way which we work on in the week. I'm not over critical of myself. I think, if you are a number one goalkeeper in the Championship, goals are going to go in the net and that's that. There are always things you can do different or little things you might have done differently. It is just a case of working hard and keeping the ball out of the net." He then played a role against Bristol City on 7 October 2018, setting up a goal for Lucas João, who went on to score twice, winning 2–1. Despite saving a penalty in a 4–0 loss against Norwich City on 3 November 2018, Dawson came under criticism for conceding Norwich's fourth goal of the game, leading to the club's goalkeeper coach Nicky Weaver to defend him. In a follow–up match against Wednesday's city rivals, Sheffield United on 9 November 2018, he made amends for mistake in the previous match by making speculator saves, including a penalty save from David McGoldrick's penalty, in a 0–0 draw to get his first clean sheet of the 2018–19 season. After the match, his performance was praised by fans and critics. Two weeks later on 27 November 2018, Dawson kept another clean sheet, in a 1–0 win against Bolton Wanderers. His performance later earned him the club's November Player of the Month. In December 2018, after Luhukay was sacked, caretaker manager Lee Bullen dropped Dawson, and reinstalled Keiren Westwood as number one, though he did play once against West Bromwich Albion on 28 December 2018. Dawson did, however, go on to make several more appearances that season, including the 2–2 away draw against Norwich City on 19 April 2019, with Keiren Westwood injured. At the end of the 2018–19 season, he made twenty–eight appearances in all competitions. Following this, local newspaper The Star said: "Dawson endured a mixed season. It took him until the 17th match of the season to record a clean sheet. There were times when he was left horribly exposed by his defence but Dawson's form was also patchy."

At the start of the 2019–20 season, Dawson started three out of the five matches throughout August. However, Dawson lost his first choice goalkeeper role to Westwood and was placed on the substitute bench for a month, though he did appear once against Everton in the third round of the League Cup. It wasn't until on 18 October 2019 when he returned to the starting line–up following the absence of Westwood, as Sheffield Wednesday drew 1–1 against Cardiff City. This was followed up by keeping a clean sheet, in a 1–0 win against Stoke City. Following this, Dawson returned to the substitute bench for the next four matches. It wasn't until on 27 November 2019 when he returned to the starting line–up, in a 1–1 draw against Birmingham City. Dawson then kept two consecutive clean sheets between 14 December 2019 and 22 December 2019 against Nottingham Forest and Bristol City. He once again kept two consecutive clean sheets between 4 January 2020 and 11 January 2020 against Brighton & Hove Albion and Leeds United. It was announced on 27 January 2020 that he signed a new 4 1/2 year contract. Dawson continued as a first-team regular, and by the time the season was suspended because of the COVID-19 pandemic, he had made twenty–four league appearances. Once the season resumed behind closed doors, he lost his first choice goalkeeper role to Joe Wildsmith for the rest of the 2019–20 season.

After returning to Sheffield Wednesday following his season-long loan at Exeter City, he would have to wait his time to get back into the first team in December, and his form would see him get a nomination for EFL Player of the Month for December conceding one goal in his three games including a penalty save.

Following the end of the 2023–24 season, the club had offered Dawson a new contract. On 24 June 2024, Dawson confirmed on Instagram that he was leaving the club after 13 years.

=== Loan Spells ===
On 7 February 2014, Dawson moved out on loan to Plymouth Argyle, where he acted as back-up for the rest of the 2013–14 season.

On 22 August 2014, Dawson joined Alfreton Town on a month's loan to gain first team experience. He made his debut for the club, starting the whole game, in a 3–2 loss against Wrexham the following day. His loan spell was extended for another month until 22 November 2014. But on 18 November 2014, Dawson's time at Alfreton Town ended when he was recalled by his parent club with seventeen appearances. After his loan spell at the club, Dawson stated that the move benefited him, as it build his match experience. During which, he kept four clean sheets for the side.

It was announced on 9 August 2016 that Dawson was loaned out to Wycombe Wanderers for seven days. He made his debut for the club, starting the whole game, in a 1–0 loss against Bristol City in the first round of the League Cup. This was followed by making his league debut for Wycombe Wanderers, as they won 2–1 win against Grimsby Town. Having made two appearances for the side, Dawson returned to his parent club after both teams failed to reach an agreement to extend.

On 6 December 2017, Dawson was sent on an emergency loan deal to Chesterfield, following first-choice keeper Joe Anyon breaking his arm in a 2–0 EFL Trophy defeat to Fleetwood Town the previous day. He made his Chesterfield debut three days later on 9 December 2017, starting the whole game, in a 2–1 win against Barnet. Dawson made another (and his last) appearance for the side, starting the whole game, in a 1–0 against Wycombe Wanderers on 16 December 2017. Having made two appearances for Chesterfield, he returned to his parent club.

On 29 July 2021, he would join League Two club, Exeter City on a season-long loan deal. Sheffield Wednesday manager Darren Moore confirmed the move was for Dawson to get game time, following his long-term injury the previous campaign. He would make his debut at home to Bradford City on 7 August 2021 and would get man of the match and a clean sheet for his performance. His home form didn't go unnoticed, and was voted the club's player of the month for August. Dawson and Exeter secured promotion to League One on 26 April 2022, with a 2–1 home win over Barrow AFC. Dawson kept 19 clean sheets in 50 games for the Grecians, describing the club's successful promotion campaign as the highlight of his career.

=== Rotherham United ===
On 24 June 2024, Dawson agreed to join League One side Rotherham United on a two-year deal. On 8 May 2026 Rotherham announced he was being released after the team's relegation to EFL League Two.

=== Bradford City ===
On 13 August 2026, Dawson signed an initial one-year contract at League One club Bradford City.

== International career ==
In October 2012, Dawson was called up to the England U18 squad for the first time. He made his England U18 debut against Italy U18 on 24 October 2012 and kept a clean sheet, winning 2–0. Dawson went on to make two appearances for the U18 side.

In March 2013, Dawson was called up to the England U19 squad for the first time. He made his England U19 debut against Turkey U19 and kept a clean sheet, winning 1–0. Despite being called on two more occasions, Dawson made three appearances for the U19 side.

== Career statistics ==
As of end of 2025–26 season

Appearances and goals by club, season and competition
Club	Season	League			FA Cup		League Cup		Other		Total	
Club	Season	Division	Apps	Goals	Apps	Goals	Apps	Goals	Apps	Goals	Apps	Goals
Sheffield Wednesday	2013–14	Championship	0	0	0	0	0	0	—		0	0
Sheffield Wednesday	2014–15	Championship	0	0	0	0	0	0	—		0	0
Sheffield Wednesday	2015–16	Championship	0	0	0	0	0	0	—		0	0
Sheffield Wednesday	2016–17	Championship	4	0	0	0	—		—		4	0
Sheffield Wednesday	2017–18	Championship	3	0	4	0	0	0	—		7	0
Sheffield Wednesday	2018–19	Championship	26	0	2	0	0	0	—		28	0
Sheffield Wednesday	2019–20	Championship	24	0	2	0	2	0	—		28	0
Sheffield Wednesday	2020–21	Championship	8	0	0	0	1	0	—		9	0
Sheffield Wednesday	2021–22	League One	0	0	0	0	0	0	—		0	0
Sheffield Wednesday	2022–23	League One	22	0	3	0	2	0	6 (Note: Appearance(s) in League One Play-offs & Football League Trophy)	0	33	0
Sheffield Wednesday	2023–24	Championship	18	0	1	0	1	0	—		20	0
Sheffield Wednesday	Total		105	0	12	0	6	0	6	0	129	0
Plymouth Argyle (loan)	2013–14	League Two	0	0	—		—		—		0	0
Alfreton Town (loan)	2014–15	Conference Premier	17	0	0	0	—		—		17	0
Wycombe Wanderers (loan)	2016–17	League Two	1	0	—		1	0	0	0	2	0
Chesterfield (loan)	2017–18	League Two	2	0	—		—		—		2	0
Exeter City (loan)	2021–22	League Two	45	0	3	0	1	0	1 (Note: Appearance(s) in EFL Trophy)	0	50	0
Rotherham United	2024–25	League One	14	0	1	0	2	0	4	0	21	0
Rotherham United	2025–26	League One	31	0	1	0	2	0	1	0	35	0
Rotherham United	Total		45	0	2	0	4	0	5	0	56	0
Bradford City	2026–27	League One	0	0	0	0	0	0	0	0	0	0
Career total			215	0	17	0	12	0	12	0	256	0

== Honours ==
Exeter City

- EFL League Two second-place promotion: 2021–22

Sheffield Wednesday

- EFL League One play-offs: 2023
