= 2023–24 Sheffield Wednesday F.C. season =

English football club season

Sheffield Wednesday
2023–24 season
- Owner: Dejphon Chansiri
- Manager: Xisco Muñoz (until 4 October); Neil Thompson (caretaker); Danny Röhl (from 13 October)
- Stadium: Hillsborough Stadium
- Championship: 20th
- FA Cup: Fourth round (vs Coventry City)
- EFL Cup: Second round (vs Mansfield Town)
- Top goalscorer: League: Anthony Musaba; Iké Ugbo (7 each); All: Anthony Musaba (8)
- Highest home attendance: 33,295 (vs West Bromwich Albion; Championship)
- Lowest home attendance: 10,724 (vs Mansfield Town; EFL Cup)
- Average home league attendance: 26,762
- Biggest win: 4–0 (vs Cardiff City; FA Cup)
- Biggest defeat: 6–0 (vs Ipswich Town; Championship)
Home colours	Away colours	Third colours

The 2023–24 season was the 156th season in the existence of Sheffield Wednesday, and the club's first season back in the Championship following promotion the previous campaign. In addition to the domestic league, the club also competed in the FA Cup and the EFL Cup.

This season was known as The Great Escape, as Wednesday went against all odds and managed to avoid relegation despite having the worst start to a season in Championship history.

== Season overview ==
=== June ===
On 1 June, Wednesday confirmed their home strip for the 2023–24 season.

On 2 June, Wednesday confirmed its retained list following the end of the previous season.

On 8 June, Head of Recruitment and Analysis David Downes left the club to join Blackpool as their new Sporting Director.

On 19 June, manager Darren Moore and his backroom staff left the club by mutual consent.

On 21 June, Wednesday confirmed their away strip for the 2023–24 season.

On 30 June, the players returned for pre-season training.

=== July ===
On 4 July, Xisco Muñoz was appointed new first-team manager.

On 14 July, Xisco confirmed his backroom staff of Miguel Muñoz as assistant manager, Roberto Cuesta Roman as first-team coach and Antonello Brambilla as goalkeeper coach.

On 24 July, Xisco finalised his backroom staff with performance manager Miguel Gomila joining the club.

On 31 July, the club published their accounts ending July 2022.

=== August ===
On 1 August, Wednesday announced their new first year scholars of; Caiden Remy-Dee, Finley Hunt, Joe Emery, Jack Swales, Voldi Mbaya, Ari-Jae Shaw, Ernie Weaver, Dom Weston, Logan Stretch, Harris Lihe and Sutura Kakay.

On 3 August, Wednesday confirmed TriggerHub as their new sleeve and back of shirt sponsor for the season.

On 4 August, Wednesday confirmed their season squad numbers.

On 26 August, Juan Delgado was called up to the Chile squad.

On 31 August, Devis Vásquez was called up to the Colombia squad.

=== September ===
On 1 September, Pierce Charles and Devlan Moses were both called up to the Northern Ireland U19 squad.

On 1 September, Di'Shon Bernard was called up to the Jamaica squad.

On 19 September, manager Xisco Muñoz confirmed that Lyle Taylor was training with the club.

On 29 September, owner Dejphon Chansiri confirmed he would no longer put funds into the club.

On 30 September, Juan Delgado was called up to the Chile squad.

=== October ===
On 3 October, following the defeat to West Bromwich Albion, the Owls were left with their worst ever start to a season.

On 4 October, manager Xisco Muñoz and his backroom staff parted company with the club.

On 7 October, Di'Shon Bernard was called up to the Jamaica squad.

On 11 October, Juan Delgado withdrew from international duty through injury.

On 13 October, Danny Röhl was appointed the new first-team manager.

On 16 October, Sascha Lense was appointed performance manager.

On 16 October, Chief Operating Officer Liam Dooley left the club to become Chief Executive Officer of Shrewsbury Town.

On 20 October, Chris Powell was confirmed as assistant coach.

On 20 October, Henrik Pedersen was confirmed as the new assistant head coach.

On 23 October, the club were fined £50,000 by The Football Association for fan conduct in the League One Playoffs win against Peterborough United the previous season.

On 27 October, the club were placed under a registration embargo because of money owed to HM Revenue and Customs.

On 31 October, Dejphon Chansiri asked fans to raise £2m to help the club pay an outstanding debt to HM Revenue and Customs and cover wages.

=== November ===
On 1 November, Dejphon Chansiri confirmed he had paid the outstanding debt and players and staff salaries were paid in full.

On 7 November, the club successfully appealed the red card against Barry Bannan following his dismissal against Bristol City.

On 10 November, Pierce Charles and Devlan Moses were both called up to the Northern Ireland U19 squad.

On 12 November, Di'Shon Bernard was called up to the Jamaica squad.

On 21 November, Sal Bibbo was confirmed as the new goalkeeper coach.

=== December ===
On 6 December, Kevin Beadell was confirmed as the new head of recruitment.

=== January ===
On 6 January, the upcoming game against Watford was postponed due to Wednesday's progression in the FA Cup.

On 31 January, Mario Bobea was called up to the Romania U19 squad.

=== February ===
On 9 February, announced Cirata as their new front of shirt sponsor running for the remainder of the campaign.

On 21 February, the club were charged with misconduct in relation to crowd control following their game against Coventry City on 20 January.

=== March ===
On 4 March, the club published their annual accounts for the year ending 31 July 2023.

On 12 March, Joey Phuthi was called up to the Zimbabwe squad.

On 12 March, Iké Ugbo was called up to the Canada squad.

On 14 March, Ian Poveda was called up to the Colombia squad.

On 14 March, Di'Shon Bernard and Bailey Cadamarteri were called up to the Jamaica squad.

On 15 March, Pierce Charles was called up to the Northern Ireland U21 squad.

On 15 March, James Beadle was called up to the England U20 squad.

On 15 March, Bailey Cadamarteri was called up to the England U19 squad.

On 19 March, Ian Poveda withdrew from the Colombia squad due to injury.

=== April ===
On 11 April, Head of Academy Goalkeeping Nicky Weaver, announced he would be stepping down from his role at the end of the season.

On 17 April, Barry Bannan was crowned the Wise Old Owls Player of the Year.

On 30 April, Barry Bannan was crowned the Sheffield Star Player of the Year, whilst manager Danny Röhl would be joint winner of the Sheffield Star Manager of the Year with Grant McCann.

=== May ===
On 4 May, Wednesday secured survival on the final day of the season following a 2–0 win against Sunderland.

On 9 May, Anthony Musaba was crowned as the 2023–24 Michael Plumb Player of the Year.

On 13 May, the clubs academy retained list was published.

On 15 May, Will Vaulks was named 2023–24 Rainbow Owls Player of the Season. Bailey Cadamarteri was named the group's Young Player of the Season and Pol Valentín the group's Signing of the Season.

On 17 May, the clubs retained list was published.

On 20 May, Pierce Charles was called up to the Northern Ireland squad.

On 24 May, Bailey Cadamarteri was called up to the England Men's Elite League squad.

On 24 May, manager Danny Röhl signed an extended long-term contract.

On 29 May, Joey Phuthi was called up to the Zimbabwe squad.

On 31 May, Di'Shon Bernard was called up to the Jamaica squad.

== First-team squad ==
As of 31 May 2024

No.	Player	Position	Nationality	Place of birth	Date of birth (age)	Signed from	Date signed	Fee	Contract end
Goalkeepers
1	Cameron Dawson	GK	(England)	Sheffield	7 July 1995 (age 31)	Sheffield United	1 July 2012	—N/a	30 June 2024
26	James Beadle	GK	(England)	Bexley	16 July 2004 (age 22)	Brighton & Hove Albion	8 January 2024	Loan	31 May 2024
46	Jack Hall	GK	(England)	Worksop	10 October 2004 (age 22)	Academy	14 October 2021	—N/a	30 June 2024
47	Pierce Charles	GK	(Northern Ireland)	Manchester	21 July 2005 (age 21)	Manchester City	14 October 2022	Free Transfer	30 June 2027
Defenders
2	Liam Palmer	RB	(Scotland)	Worksop	19 September 1991 (age 35)	Academy	1 July 2010	—N/a	30 June 2025
3	Kristian Pedersen	LB	(Denmark)	Ringsted	4 August 1994 (age 32)	Swansea City	1 February 2024	Loan	31 May 2024
5	Bambo Diaby	CB	(Senegal)	Ziguinchor	17 December 1997 (age 28)	Preston North End	2 August 2023	Undisclosed	30 June 2025
6	Dominic Iorfa	CB	(England)	Southend-on-Sea	24 June 1995 (age 31)	Wolverhampton Wanderers	31 January 2019	Undisclosed	30 June 2024
14	Pol Valentín	RB	(Spain)	Avinyonet de Puigventós	21 February 1997 (age 29)	Sporting Gijón	27 July 2023	Undisclosed	30 June 2025
15	Juan Delgado	RB	(Chile)	Chillán	5 March 1993 (age 33)	Paços de Ferreira	24 July 2023	Undisclosed	30 June 2024
17	Di'Shon Bernard	CB	(Jamaica)	Wandsworth	14 October 2000 (age 26)	Manchester United	31 July 2023	Free Transfer	30 June 2024
20	Michael Ihiekwe	CB	(England)	Liverpool	20 November 1992 (age 33)	Rotherham United	1 July 2022	Free Transfer	30 June 2025
23	Akin Famewo	CB	(England)	Lewisham	9 November 1998 (age 28)	Norwich City	6 July 2022	Undisclosed	30 June 2025
25	Gui Siqueira	RB	(Brazil)		6 December 2004 (age 21)	Queens Park Rangers	19 July 2023	Free Transfer	30 June 2025
33	Reece James	LB	(England)	Bacup	7 November 1993 (age 33)	Blackpool	30 June 2023	Undisclosed	30 June 2024
34	Joey Phuthi	RB	(Zimbabwe)	Harare	2 January 2005 (age 21)	Academy	25 August 2023	—N/a	30 June 2025
38	Mackenzie Maltby	CB	(England)	Chesterfield	4 December 2004 (age 21)	Academy	1 July 2023	—N/a	30 June 2024
39	Sam Reed	LB	(England)	Sheffield	27 March 2003 (age 23)	Brighouse Town	20 July 2023	Free Transfer	30 June 2025
—N/a	Ciaran Brennan	CB	(Republic of Ireland)	Sheffield	5 May 2000 (age 26)	Academy	3 May 2018	—N/a	30 June 2024
Midfielders
4	Will Vaulks	DM	(Wales)	Wirral	13 September 1993 (age 33)	Cardiff City	1 July 2022	Free Transfer	30 June 2024
10	Barry Bannan	CM	(Scotland)	Airdrie	1 December 1989 (age 36)	Crystal Palace	31 August 2015	Undisclosed	30 June 2025
18	Marvin Johnson	LM	(England)	Birmingham	1 December 1990 (age 35)	Middlesbrough	5 August 2021	Free Transfer	30 June 2025
22	Jeff Hendrick	CM	(Republic of Ireland)	Dublin	31 January 1992 (age 34)	Newcastle United	1 September 2023	Loan	31 May 2024
30	Sean Fusire	CM	(England)	Sheffield	31 May 2005 (age 21)	Academy	9 December 2022	—N/a	30 June 2025
31	Rio Shipston	CM	(England)	Sheffield	7 November 2004 (age 22)	Academy	14 December 2022	—N/a	30 June 2025
44	Momo Diaby	DM	(France)	Grasse	3 September 1996 (age 30)	Portimonense	11 August 2023	Loan	31 May 2024
Forwards
7	Mallik Wilks	RW	(England)	Leeds	15 December 1998 (age 27)	Hull City	22 August 2022	Undisclosed	30 June 2025
9	Lee Gregory	CF	(England)	Sheffield	26 August 1988 (age 38)	Stoke City	5 August 2021	Free transfer	30 June 2024
11	Josh Windass	CF	(England)	Kingston upon Hull	9 January 1994 (age 32)	Wigan Athletic	2 September 2020	Undisclosed	30 June 2024
12	Iké Ugbo	CF	(Canada)	Lewisham	21 September 1998 (age 28)	Troyes	11 January 2024	Loan	31 May 2024
13	Callum Paterson	CF	(Scotland)	London	13 October 1994 (age 32)	Cardiff City	30 September 2020	Undisclosed	30 June 2025
24	Michael Smith	CF	(England)	Wallsend	17 October 1991 (age 35)	Rotherham United	1 July 2022	Free Transfer	30 June 2025
27	Ashley Fletcher	CF	(England)	Keighley	2 October 1995 (age 31)	Watford	25 July 2023	Loan	31 May 2024
36	Ian Poveda	RW	(Colombia)	Southwalk	9 February 2000 (age 26)	Leeds United	1 February 2024	Loan	31 May 2024
41	Djeidi Gassama	LW	(France)	Nieleba Haouisse	10 September 2003 (age 23)	Paris Saint-Germain	15 August 2023	Undisclosed	30 June 2026
42	Bailey Cadamarteri	CF	(England)	Leeds	9 May 2005 (age 21)	Academy	8 June 2022	—N/a	30 June 2028
45	Anthony Musaba	RW	(Netherlands)	Beuningen	6 December 2000 (age 25)	Monaco	3 August 2023	Undisclosed	30 June 2025
Out on Loan
8	George Byers	CM	(Scotland)	Ilford	29 May 1996 (age 30)	(Wales) Swansea City	3 August 2021	Undisclosed	30 June 2024
19	Tyreeq Bakinson	DM	(England)	Camden	10 October 1998 (age 28)	Bristol City	21 July 2022	Undisclosed	30 June 2024

== Pre-season and friendlies ==
The club announced their first friendly, a testimonial match for former player Drew Talbot against Chesterfield on 2 June. On 6 June, another friendly against York City was confirmed. A day later, a third friendly was added, at Doncaster Rovers. It was confirmed on 29 June that they would have a pre-season camp in Spain with a friendly against Real Murcia confirmed. A friendly against Luton Town at home was announced on 7 July. The day they travelled to Spain, a second friendly on their tour against CD Eldense was confirmed.

8 July 2023 Friendly	York City	1–1	Sheffield Wednesday	Huntington, York
13:30 BST	Barnes 59'	Report	Windass 26'	Stadium: LNER Community Stadium; Attendance: 5,953; Referee: Ben Speedie

11 July 2023 Friendly	Chesterfield	1–2	Sheffield Wednesday	Chesterfield
19:00 BST	King 36'	Report	Brennan (yellow card) 43'; Gregory 47', 90'	Stadium: SMH Group Stadium; Attendance: 9,099

14 July 2023 Friendly	Burnley	3–0	Sheffield Wednesday	Burnley
	Twine 1'; Brownhill 52'; Costelloe 88'	Report		Stadium: Gawthorpe Training Ground; Attendance: 0 (Played behind closed doors)

18 July 2023 Friendly	Real Murcia	0–0	Sheffield Wednesday	San Pedro del Pinatar
20:00 CEST	Hector (yellow card) 87'	Report	Bannan (yellow card) 27'; Shipston (yellow card) 72'	Stadium: Pinatar Arena; Referee: Diaz Escuero

21 July 2023 Friendly	CD Eldense	4–0	Sheffield Wednesday	San Pedro del Pinatar
10:00 CEST	Ortiz 5'; Ortuño 35'; Jorquera 79'; Chapela 82'	Report	Paterson (yellow card)	Stadium: Pinatar Arena

25 July 2023 Friendly	Doncaster Rovers	1–0	Sheffield Wednesday	Doncaster
19:00 BST	Molyneux 73'	Report		Stadium: Eco-Power Stadium

29 July 2023 Friendly	Sheffield Wednesday	1–2	Luton Town	Owlerton, Sheffield
15:00 BST	Smith 9' (pen.); Famewo (yellow card) 37'	Report	Mpanzu 23'; Morris 82'	Stadium: Hillsborough Stadium; Referee: David Webb

== Competitions ==
=== Overall record ===
Competition	First match	Last match	Starting round	Final position	Record							
Competition	First match	Last match	Starting round	Final position	Pld	W	D	L	GF	GA	GD	Win %
Championship	4 August 2023	4 May 2024	Matchday 1	20th	46	15	8	23	44	68	−24	32.61
FA Cup	6 January 2024	6 February 2024	Third round	Fourth round	3	1	1	1	6	5	+1	33.33
EFL Cup	8 August 2023	29 August 2023	First round	Second round	2	0	2	0	2	2	+0	0.00
Total					51	16	11	24	52	75	−23	31.37

Last updated: 4 May 2024
Source: Soccerway

=== EFL Championship ===
==== League table ====
Pos	Team	Pld	W	D	L	GF	GA	GD	Pts	Promotion, qualification or relegation
17	Stoke City	46	15	11	20	49	60	−11	56	
18	Queens Park Rangers	46	15	11	20	47	58	−11	56	
19	Blackburn Rovers	46	14	11	21	60	74	−14	53	
20	Sheffield Wednesday	46	15	8	23	44	68	−24	53	
21	Plymouth Argyle	46	13	12	21	59	70	−11	51	
22	Birmingham City (R)	46	13	11	22	50	65	−15	50	Relegated to EFL League One
23	Huddersfield Town (R)	46	9	18	19	48	77	−29	45	Relegated to EFL League One

Source: EFL official website
Rules for classification: 1) Points; 2) Goal difference; 3) Number of goals scored; 4) Head-to-head results; 5) Wins; 6) Away goals; 7) Penalty points (sec 9.5); 8) Number of 12-point sending off offences; 9) Play-off (only if needed to determine promotion/relegation)
(R) Relegated

==== Results summary ====
Overall								Home						Away					
Pld	W	D	L	GF	GA	GD	Pts	W	D	L	GF	GA	GD	W	D	L	GF	GA	GD
46	15	8	23	44	68	−24	53	8	7	8	27	27	0	7	1	15	17	41	−24

Last updated: 4 May 2024.
Source: Soccerway

==== Results by round ====
Round	1	2	3	4	5	6	7	8	9	10	11	12	13	14	15	16	17	18	19	20	21	22	23	24	25	26	27	28	29	30	31	32	33	34	35	36	37	38	39	40	41	42	43	44	45	46
Ground	H	A	H	A	A	H	H	A	H	A	H	A	A	H	A	H	A	H	H	A	A	H	H	A	A	H	A	H	H	A	H	A	A	H	A	H	H	A	H	A	A	H	H	A	H	A
Result	L	L	L	L	D	L	D	L	L	L	D	L	L	W	L	L	L	D	W	W	L	W	L	L	W	W	L	L	D	L	W	L	W	W	W	W	L	L	D	L	W	D	D	W	W	W
Position	19	22	24	24	23	23	23	24	24	24	24	24	24	24	24	24	24	24	24	23	23	23	23	23	23	22	22	23	23	23	23	23	23	23	23	23	23	23	23	23	23	22	23	21	20	20

Updated to match(es) played on 24 May 2024. Source: Soccerway
A = Away; H = Home; W = Win; D = Draw; L = Loss

==== Matches ====
On 22 June, the EFL Championship fixtures were released.

4 August 2023 1	Sheffield Wednesday	1–2	Southampton	Sheffield
20:00 BST	Gregory (yellow card) 28', (goal) 54'; Paterson (yellow card) 30'; Delgado (yellow card) 45+1'; Dawson (yellow card) 78'	Report	Armstrong 8', (yellow card) 28'; Manning (yellow card) 37'; Tella (yellow card) 64'; Stephens (yellow card) 84'; Adams 87'	Stadium: Hillsborough Stadium; Attendance: 28,558; Referee: Bobby Madley
Note: Live on Sky Sports

12 August 2023 2	Hull City	4–2	Sheffield Wednesday	Kingston upon Hull
15:00 BST	Tufan 45+5' (pen.), 58', 70'; Connolly 85'; Traoré (yellow card) 90'	Report	Paterson (yellow card) 26'; Delgado 36'; Windass (yellow card) 44'; Gregory (yellow card) 45+4'; Smith 90+4'	Stadium: MKM Stadium; Attendance: 20,410; Referee: Matt Donohue

19 August 2023 3	Sheffield Wednesday	0–1	Preston North End	Sheffield
15:00 BST	Vásquez (yellow card) 82'	Report	Lindsay 49'; Ledson (yellow card) 90+3'	Stadium: Hillsborough Stadium; Attendance: 25,138; Referee: Jeremy Simpson

26 August 2023 4	Cardiff City	2–1	Sheffield Wednesday	Cardiff
15:00 BST	Ugbo 48'; Wintle 90+8' (pen.)	Report	Bannan (yellow card) 42', (goal) 76'; Bernard (yellow card) 66'; Delgado (yellow card) 80'; Paterson (yellow card) 90'; Windass (yellow card) 90+12'	Stadium: Cardiff City Stadium; Attendance: 21,058; Referee: Darren Bond

2 September 2023 5	Leeds United	0–0	Sheffield Wednesday	Leeds
15:00 BST	Rutter (yellow card) 79'	Report	Delgado (yellow card) 35'; Windass (yellow card) 61'	Stadium: Elland Road; Attendance: 36,484; Referee: Dean Whitestone

16 September 2023 6	Sheffield Wednesday	0–1	Ipswich Town	Sheffield
15:00 BST	Famewo (yellow card) 11'; Paterson (yellow card) 46'; Hendrick (yellow card) 66'	Report	Morsy (yellow card) 9'; Burns (yellow card) 41'; Chaplin 45'; Hladký (yellow card) 56'	Stadium: Hillsborough Stadium; Attendance: 25,938; Referee: James Linington

19 September 2023 7	Sheffield Wednesday	1–1	Middlesbrough	Sheffield
20:00 BST	Windass (yellow card); Musaba 38'; Byers (yellow card) 86'	Report	Jones (yellow card) 48'; Lenihan 53'	Stadium: Hillsborough Stadium; Attendance: 22,975; Referee: David Webb
Note: Live on Sky Sports

23 September 2023 8	Swansea City	3–0	Sheffield Wednesday	Swansea
15:00 BST	Cullen (yellow card) 21'; Lowe 28' (pen.); Patino (yellow card) 45+6', (goal) 67'; Yates 64'	Report	Valentín (yellow card) 27'; Hendrick (yellow card) 39'	Stadium: Swansea.com Stadium; Attendance: 16,865; Referee: Anthony Backhouse

29 September 2023 9	Sheffield Wednesday	0–3	Sunderland	Sheffield
20:00 BST	Diaby (yellow card) 62'; Delgado (yellow card) 83'	Report	Ballard 5'; Clarke 8', 31' (pen.)	Stadium: Hillsborough Stadium; Attendance: 25,987; Referee: Sam Barrott
Note: Live on Sky Sports

3 October 2023 10	West Bromwich Albion	1–0	Sheffield Wednesday	West Bromwich
20:00 BST	Swift 13'	Report	Palmer (yellow card) 66'	Stadium: The Hawthorns; Attendance: 22,558; Referee: John Busby

7 October 2023 11	Sheffield Wednesday	0–0	Huddersfield Town	Sheffield
15:00 BST	Vaulks (yellow card) 58'	Report	Hogg (yellow card) 90+5'	Stadium: Hillsborough Stadium; Attendance: 26,025; Referee: Matthew Donohue

21 October 2023 12	Watford	1–0	Sheffield Wednesday	Watford
15:00 BST	Porteous (yellow card) 45'; Lewis (yellow card) 50'; Asprilla 82'	Report	Hendrick (yellow card) 68'	Stadium: Vicarage Road; Attendance: 19,102; Referee: Dean Whitestone

25 October 2023 13	Plymouth Argyle	3–0	Sheffield Wednesday	Plymouth
19:45 BST	Houghton (yellow card) 41'; Kesler-Hayden (yellow card) 43'; Bundu 44'; Whittaker 45+3'; Hardie 76'	Report	Iorfa (yellow card) 42'	Stadium: Home Park; Attendance: 16,225; Referee: James Linington

29 October 2023 14	Sheffield Wednesday	2–0	Rotherham United	Sheffield
13:00 GMT	Smith 11', 36'; Bernard (yellow card) 45+3'; Dawson (yellow card) 90+4'	Report	Peltier (yellow card) 39'; Tiéhi (yellow card) 47'; Hugill (yellow card) 82'	Stadium: Hillsborough Stadium; Attendance: 29,038; Referee: Andy Davies

4 November 2023 15	Bristol City	1–0	Sheffield Wednesday	Bristol
15:00 GMT	Sykes (yellow card) 45+2'; Dickie 64'; Pring (yellow card) 67'; Gardner-Hickman (yellow card) 84'	Report	Bannan (red card) 32'; Gassama (yellow card) 42'	Stadium: Aston Gate; Attendance: 22,322; Referee: Lewis Smith

11 November 2023 16	Sheffield Wednesday	0–4	Millwall	Sheffield
15:00 GMT	Bernard (yellow card) 51'; Paterson (yellow card) 82'	Report	Wallace 31'; Cooper (yellow card) 41'; Saville 42', (yellow card) 72'; Harding 52'; Norton-Cuffy 72'	Stadium: Hillsborough Stadium; Attendance: 25,678; Referee: Gavin Ward

25 November 2023 17	Birmingham City	2–1	Sheffield Wednesday	Birmingham
15:00 GMT	Dembélé (yellow card) 15'; Bacuna 45+3'; James 81'	Report	Windass (yellow card) 32'; Wilks (yellow card) 37'; Bannan (yellow card) 39'; Byers 45'; Musaba (yellow card) 61'; Gassama (yellow card) 70'	Stadium: St Andrew's; Attendance: 20,941; Referee: Rebecca Welch

29 November 2023 18	Sheffield Wednesday	1–1	Leicester City	Sheffield
19:45 BST	Famewo (yellow card) 20'; Bannan (yellow card) 57'; Hendrick 90+3'	Report	Fatawu 23'; Vestergaard (yellow card) 35'	Stadium: Hillsborough Stadium; Attendance: 26,036; Referee: Sam Barrott

2 December 2023 19	Sheffield Wednesday	3–1	Blackburn Rovers	Sheffield
15:00 GMT	Cadamarteri 5'; Bernard (yellow card) 24'; Johnson 78'; Windass 90+1'; Vaulks (yellow card) 90+4'	Report	Szmodics 65'; Hill (yellow card) 82'	Stadium: Hillsborough Stadium; Attendance: 24,507; Referee: David Webb

9 December 2023 20	Stoke City	0–1	Sheffield Wednesday	Stoke-on-Trent
15:00 GMT	Burger (yellow card) 10'; Mmaee (penalty missed) 64'; McNally (yellow card) 82'; Clark (yellow card) 88'	Report	Famewo (yellow card) 9'; Johnson (yellow card) 34'; Musaba 90+1', (yellow card) 90+5'; Bannan (yellow card) 90+6'	Stadium: Bet365 Stadium; Attendance: 22,347; Referee: David Coote

13 December 2023 21	Norwich City	3–1	Sheffield Wednesday	Norwich
19:45 GMT	Sainz 7'; Fisher (yellow card) 30'; Barnes 58'; Rowe 72'	Report	Cadamarteri 32'; Palmer (yellow card) 42'	Stadium: Carrow Road; Attendance: 25,521; Referee: Leigh Doughty

16 December 2023 22	Sheffield Wednesday	2–1	Queens Park Rangers	Sheffield
15:00 GMT	Bernard (yellow card) 57'; Bannan (yellow card) 64'; Vaulks (yellow card) 78'; Cadamarteri 86'; Musaba 90+4', (yellow card) 90+5'; Palmer (yellow card) 90+7'	Report	Cannon (yellow card) 14'; Diaby 37' (o.g.); Smyth (yellow card) 64'; Dozzell (yellow card) 72'; Field (yellow card) 82'	Stadium: Hillsborough Stadium; Attendance: 24,739; Referee: Andy Davies

23 December 2023 23	Sheffield Wednesday	1–2	Cardiff City	Sheffield
15:00 GMT	Musaba 28', (yellow card) 47'; Vaulks (yellow card) 36'; Paterson (yellow card) 67'	Report	Grant 74'; Famewo 88' (o.g.); Ng (yellow card) 90+2'; McGuinness (yellow card) 90+5'	Stadium: Hillsborough Stadium; Attendance: 26,009; Referee: Sam Barrott

26 December 2023 24	Coventry City	2–0	Sheffield Wednesday	Coventry
15:00 GMT	Sakamoto 20', 89'; Latibeaudiere (yellow card) 55'; Kitching (red card) 90+6'	Report	Famewo (yellow card) 70'; Diaby (red card) 90+6'	Stadium: Coventry Building Society Arena; Attendance: 29,208; Referee: Oliver Langford

29 December 2023 25	Preston North End	0–1	Sheffield Wednesday	Preston
19:45 GMT	Lindsay (yellow card) 24'; Potts (yellow card) 69'; Osmajić (yellow card) 75'; Frøkjær-Jensen (yellow card) 90+5'	Report	Johnson 27'; Musaba (yellow card) 63'; Byers (red card) 85'; Dawson (yellow card) 86'	Stadium: Deepdale; Attendance: 19,763; Referee: Rebecca Welch

1 January 2024 26	Sheffield Wednesday	3–1	Hull City	Sheffield
17:15 GMT	Johnson 49'; Gassama 55'; Palmer (yellow card) 60'; Valentín (yellow card) 62'; Windass 73'; Wilks (yellow card) 90+3'	Report	Morton (red card) 35'; Jones (yellow card) 45+1'; Twine (yellow card) 57', (goal) 76' (pen.); Greaves (yellow card) 85'; Slater (yellow card) 89'	Stadium: Hillsborough Stadium; Attendance: 27,489; Referee: Kevin Bond
Note: Live on Sky Sports

13 January 2024 27	Southampton	4–0	Sheffield Wednesday	Southampton
15:00 GMT	Adams 35'; Bednarek (yellow card) 56'; Armstrong (yellow card) 59', (goal) 63'; Downes (yellow card) 65'; Fraser 75'; Mara 85'	Report	Bernard (yellow card) 10'; Bannan (yellow card) 50'; Ihiekwe (yellow card) 72'	Stadium: St Mary's Stadium; Attendance: 30,189; Referee: Lewis Smith

20 January 2024 28	Sheffield Wednesday	1–2	Coventry City	Sheffield
15:00 GMT	Ihiekwe (yellow card) 13'; Gassama (yellow card) 36'; Windass 68'; Bannan (yellow card) 87'; Johnson (yellow card) 89'	Report	Sheaf 40', 57', (yellow card) 43'; Sakamoto (yellow card) 53' van Ewijk (yellow card) 59'; Godden (yellow card) 66'; Palmer (yellow card) 84'	Stadium: Hillsborough Stadium; Attendance: 28,129; Referee: Anthony Backhouse

31 January 2024 29	Sheffield Wednesday	0–0	Watford	Sheffield
19:45 GMT	Palmer (yellow card) 29'; Famewo (yellow card) 39'; Johnson (yellow card) 42'; Bannan (yellow card) 75'	Report	Matheus Martins (yellow card) 25'; Pollock (yellow card) 76'; Hamer (yellow card) 90'	Stadium: Hillsborough Stadium; Attendance: 22,303; Referee: Rebecca Welch
Note: Fixture was originally scheduled for 27 January, but was postponed due to Sheffield Wednesday's FA Cup participation.

3 February 2024 30	Huddersfield Town	4–0	Sheffield Wednesday	Huddersfield
15:00 GMT	Spencer (yellow card) 47'; Pearson 68'; Koroma 70', 80'; Thomas 76'; Matos (yellow card) 79'	Report	Pedersen (yellow card) 33'	Stadium: John Smith's Stadium; Attendance: 21,067; Referee: Matt Donohue

9 February 2024 31	Sheffield Wednesday	2–0	Birmingham City	Sheffield
20:00 GMT	Bannan (yellow card) 4'; Ugbo 15', 53'; Vaulks (yellow card) 85'; Smith (yellow card) 90+9'	Report	Bielik (yellow card) 90+9'	Stadium: Hillsborough Stadium; Attendance: 25,431; Referee: Andy Davies
Note: Fixture was originally scheduled for 10 February, but was moved for Sky Sports coverage.

13 February 2024 32	Leicester City	2–0	Sheffield Wednesday	Leicester
19:45 GMT	Fatawu 4'; Vardy 36'; Winks (yellow card) 7.6'	Report	Ihiekwe (yellow card) 6'; Bernard (yellow card) 64'	Stadium: King Power Stadium; Attendance: 31,550; Referee: Tom Nield

17 February 2024 33	Millwall	0–2	Sheffield Wednesday	Bermondsey
15:00 GMT	Honeyman (yellow card) 28'; Saville (yellow card) 77'; Tangaga (yellow card) 90+3'	Report	Ugbo 31'; Musaba 41'; Vaulks (yellow card) 51'; Fletcher (yellow card) 90+1' (yellow-red card) 90+2'	Stadium: The Den; Attendance: 17,041; Referee: Geoff Eltringham

24 February 2024 34	Sheffield Wednesday	2–1	Bristol City	Sheffield
15:00 GMT	Ugbo 16', 45'; Bernard (yellow card) 29' (yellow-red card) 78'; Johnson (yellow card) 70'	Report	Knight 25'; Dickie (yellow card) 34'; Gardner-Hickman (yellow card) 53'; Roberts (yellow card) 61'	Stadium: Hillsborough Stadium; Attendance: 26,328; Referee: Thomas Kirk

2 March 2024 35	Rotherham United	0–1	Sheffield Wednesday	Rotherham
15:00 GMT	Odoffin (yellow card) 35'	Report	Ugbo (yellow card) 55', (goal) 66'; Smith (yellow card) 88'	Stadium: AESSEAL New York Stadium; Attendance: 11,541; Referee: David Webb

5 March 2024 36	Sheffield Wednesday	1–0	Plymouth Argyle	Sheffield
19:45 GMT	Gassama 60'; M. Diaby (yellow card) 89'	Report	Forshaw (yellow card) 45'; Randell (yellow card) 58'	Stadium: Hillsborough Stadium; Attendance: 23,037; Referee: Stephen Martin
Note: Fixture was originally scheduled for 6 March, but was moved forward for Sky Sports coverage.

8 March 2024 37	Sheffield Wednesday	0–2	Leeds United	Sheffield
20:00 GMT	Famewo (yellow card) 76'	Report	Ampadu (yellow card) 45+1'; Bamford 45+5'; Gnonto 58'	Stadium: Hillsborough Stadium; Attendance: 30,032; Referee: Samuel Allison
Note: Fixture was originally scheduled for 9 March, but was moved forward for Sky Sports coverage.

16 March 2024 38	Ipswich Town	6–0	Sheffield Wednesday	Ipswich
15:00 GMT	Hutchinson 15', 49', (yellow card) 34'; Burgess 37'; Broadhead 45+1'; Al-Hamadi 80', 90'	Report	Ihiekwe (yellow card) 32'; Vaulks (yellow card) 86'	Stadium: Portman Road; Attendance: 29,325; Referee: Leigh Doughty

29 March 2024 39	Sheffield Wednesday	1–1	Swansea City	Sheffield
25:00 GMT	Cadamarteri 41'; Daiby (yellow card) 66'	Report	Yates (yellow card) 66'; Lowe 76'	Stadium: Hillsborough Stadium; Attendance: 28,301; Referee: Geoff Eltringham

1 April 2024 40	Middlesbrough	2–0	Sheffield Wednesday	Middlesbrough
15:00 BST	Greenwood (yellow card) 24', (penalty missed) 81'; Ihiekwe 41' (o.g.); Jones 73'	Report	Vaulks (yellow card) 33'; Beadle (yellow card) 40'; Famewo (yellow card) 79'; Iorfa (yellow card) 80'	Stadium: Riverside Stadium; Attendance: 27,893; Referee: Tom Nield

6 April 2024 41	Queens Park Rangers	0–2	Sheffield Wednesday	Shepherd's Bush
15:00 BST	Hayden (yellow card) 40'; Dykes (yellow card) 76'; Andersen (yellow card) 90+5'	Report	Windass (yellow card) 40'; Palmer (yellow card) 43'; Gassama 59'; Bannan (yellow card) 90+1'; Musaba 90+6'	Stadium: Loftus Road; Attendance: 17,502; Referee: Graham Scott

9 April 2024 42	Sheffield Wednesday	2–2	Norwich City	Sheffield
19:45 GMT	Vaulks (yellow card) 76'; Ihiekwe 78'; Bannan (yellow card) 81'; Smith 85'	Report	Sargent 11'; Sainz 16'; Barnes (yellow card) 38'	Stadium: Hillsborough Stadium; Attendance: 28,516; Referee: Chris Kavanagh

13 April 2024 43	Sheffield Wednesday	1–1	Stoke City	Sheffield
15:00 GMT	Johnson (yellow card) 27'; Palmer 68'	Report	Baker (yellow card) 33'; Thompson (yellow card) 60'; Rose (yellow card) 71'; Cundle 76'; Manhoef (yellow card) 77'	Stadium: Hillsborough Stadium; Attendance: 32,041; Referee: Stephen Martin

21 April 2024 44	Blackburn Rovers	1–3	Sheffield Wednesday	Blackburn
12:30 BST	Szmodics 9', (yellow card) 61'; Carter (yellow card) 77'; Hyam (yellow card) 90+2'	Report	Windass 6'; Johnson 58', (yellow card) 67'; Pears 64' (o.g.); Palmer (yellow card) 69'; Vaulks (yellow card) 90+3'	Stadium: Ewood Park; Attendance: 21,718; Referee: Josh Smith
Note: Fixture was originally scheduled for 20 April, but was moved forward for Sky Sports coverage.

27 April 2024 45	Sheffield Wednesday	3–0	West Bromwich Albion	Sheffield
15:00 GMT	Musaba 22', (yellow card) 23'; Ugbo 50'; Windass 69', (yellow card) 69'; Famewo (yellow card) 90+7'	Report	Bartley (yellow card) 90+7'	Stadium: Hillsborough Stadium; Attendance: 33,295; Referee: Graham Scott

4 May 2024 46	Sunderland	0–2	Sheffield Wednesday	Sunderland
12:30 BST	Alese (yellow card) 49'	Report	Palmer 29', (yellow card) 78'; Windass 38'	Stadium: Stadium of Light; Attendance: 44,222; Referee: Gavin Ward

=== FA Cup ===
Sheffield Wednesday were drawn at home to Cardiff City in the third round and against Coventry City in the fourth round.

6 January 2024 Third round	Sheffield Wednesday	4–0	Cardiff City	Sheffield
17:30 GMT	Windass 2'; Sawyers 38' (o.g.); Palmer 40'; Wilks 90+1'	Report	Wintle (penalty missed) 4'; Robinson (penalty missed) 7'; Benjamin (yellow card) 27'; Bowler (yellow card) 48'	Stadium: Hillsborough Stadium; Attendance: 10,995; Referee: Thomas Kirk

26 January 2024 Fourth round	Sheffield Wednesday	1–1	Coventry City	Sheffield
19:45 GMT	Famewo (yellow card) 52'; Bernard (yellow card) 78'; Gassama 84'	Report	Torp 45'; Palmer (yellow card) 47'; Dasilva (yellow card) 64'; Kitching (yellow card) 79'	Stadium: Hillsborough Stadium; Attendance: 14,215; Referee: Darren Bond

6 February 2024 Fourth round replay	Coventry City	4–1	Sheffield Wednesday	Coventry
19:45 GMT	Palmer 3'; O'Hare 50', 56'; Wright 58'	Report	Cadamerteri 10'; Siqueira (yellow card) 19'; Wilks (yellow card) 45'; Diaby (yellow card) 53'; Fletcher (yellow card) 90+2'	Stadium: Coventry Building Society Arena; Attendance: 19,359; Referee: Chris Kavanagh

=== EFL Cup ===
Wednesday were drawn against Stockport County in the first round on 22 June 2023. The second round was drawn on 9 August 2023 against Mansfield Town.

8 August 2023 First round	Sheffield Wednesday	1–1 (4–1 p)	Stockport County	Sheffield
19:45 BST	Valentín (yellow card) 8'; Vaulks (yellow card) 45'; Paterson (yellow card) 90+5'; Bakinson 90+7'	Report	Lemonheigh-Evans (yellow card) 4'; Olaofe (yellow card) 10'; Madden 16'; Rydel (yellow card) 84'	Stadium: Hillsborough Stadium; Attendance: 10,886; Referee: Lewis Smith
	Penalties
	Windass (penalty scored); Paterson (penalty scored); Bannan (penalty scored); Gregory (penalty scored)		(penalty missed) Madden; (penalty scored) Rydel; (penalty missed) Barry

29 August 2023 Second round	Sheffield Wednesday	1–1 (4–5 p)	Mansfield Town	Sheffield
19:45 BST	Musaba 28'; Bakinson (yellow card) 44'; Smith (yellow card) 87'	Report	Oates 85'	Stadium: Hillsborough Stadium; Attendance: 10,724; Referee: Sunny Singh Gill
	Penalties
	Smith (penalty scored); Windass (penalty scored); Bannan (penalty scored); Vaulks (penalty missed); Gregory (penalty scored); Palmer (penalty missed)		(penalty scored) Bowery; (penalty scored) Maris; (penalty scored) Keillor-Dunn; (penalty missed) Swan; (penalty scored) Oates; (penalty scored) Flint

== Transfers & contracts ==
=== In ===
Date	Pos	Player	Transferred from	Fee	Ref
30 June 2023	LB	(England) Reece James	(England) Blackpool	Undisclosed	
11 July 2023	CM	(England) Jay Buchan †	(England) Leeds United	Free Transfer	
11 July 2023	CB	(England) Ryan Wilson †	(England) Blackburn Rovers	Free Transfer	
19 July 2023	RB	(Brazil) Gui Siqueira †	(England) Queens Park Rangers	Free Transfer	
20 July 2023	LB	(England) Sam Reed †	(England) Brighouse Town	Free Transfer	
24 July 2023	RB	(Chile) Juan Delgado	(Portugal) Paços de Ferreira	Undisclosed	
27 July 2023	RB	(Spain) Pol Valentín	(Spain) Sporting Gijón	Undisclosed	
31 July 2023	CB	(Jamaica) Di'Shon Bernard	(England) Manchester United	Free Transfer	
2 August 2023	CB	(Senegal) Bambo Diaby	(England) Preston North End	Undisclosed	
3 August 2023	RW	(Netherlands) Anthony Musaba	(France) Monaco	Undisclosed	
15 August 2023	LW	(France) Djeidi Gassama	(France) Paris Saint-Germain	Undisclosed	
1 March 2024	CB	(Republic of Ireland) Gabriel Otegbayo †	(England) Burnley	Free Transfer	

† Signed for the academy

=== Out ===
Date	Pos	Player	Transferred to	Fee	Ref
30 June 2023	MF	(England) Dennis Adeniran	(Portugal) Portimonense	Released	
30 June 2023	MF	(England) Paulo Aguas	(England) Hallam	Released	
30 June 2023	CB	(England) Josh Ashman	(England) Guiseley	Released	
30 June 2023	RW	(England) Jake Bradford	(England) Retford United	Released	
30 June 2023	LB	(England) Jaden Brown	(England) Lincoln City	Released	
30 June 2023	CB	(England) Josh Chapman	(United States) Queens Men's Soccer	Released	
30 June 2023	RB	(England) Leojo Davidson	(England) Basford United	Released	
30 June 2023	CM	(England) Fisayo Dele-Bashiru	(Turkey) Hatayspor	Rejected contract	
30 June 2023	RW	(England) Sam Durrant	(Republic of Ireland) Dundalk	Released	
30 June 2023	LB	(England) Ryan Galvin	(England) FC Halifax Town	Released	
30 June 2023	CB	(England) Ben Heneghan	(England) Fleetwood Town	Released	
30 June 2023	RB	(England) Jack Hunt	(England) Bristol Rovers	Released	
30 June 2023	CF	(Poland) Kamil Maciag	(England) Winstanley Warriors	Released	
30 June 2023	RW	(England) Danai Rhule	(England) Maltby Main	Released	
30 June 2023	LB	(England) Fuad Sesay	(England) Dover Athletic	Released	
30 June 2023	GK	(England) David Stockdale	(England) York City	Released	
30 June 2023	CM	(Zimbabwe) Tafadzwa Tapudzai	(United States) Old Dominion Monarchs	Released	
30 June 2023	MF	(England) Will Trueman	(England) Mickleover	Released	

=== Loaned in ===
Date	Pos	Player	Loaned from	Until	Ref
25 July 2023	CF	(England) Ashley Fletcher	(England) Watford	End of Season	
5 August 2023	GK	(Colombia) Devis Vásquez	(Italy) AC Milan	18 January 2024 (Note: Devis Vásquez was recalled from his loan on 18 January 2024.)	
11 August 2023	DM	(France) Momo Diaby	(Portugal) Portimonense	End of Season	
1 September 2023	CM	(England) John Buckley	(England) Blackburn Rovers	2 January 2024 (Note: John Buckley was recalled from his loan on 2 January 2024.)	
1 September 2023	CM	(Republic of Ireland) Jeff Hendrick	(England) Newcastle United	End of Season	
8 January 2024	GK	(England) James Beadle	(England) Brighton & Hove Albion	End of Season	
11 January 2024	CF	(Canada) Iké Ugbo	(France) Troyes	End of Season	
1 February 2024	LB	(Denmark) Kristian Pedersen	(Wales) Swansea City	End of Season	
1 February 2024	RW	(Colombia) Ian Poveda	(England) Leeds United	End of Season	

=== Loaned out ===
Date	Pos	Player	Loaned to	Until	Ref
4 October 2023	GK	(England) Luke Jackson	(England) Gainsborough Trinity	20 January 2024 (Note: Luke Jackson’s loan was extended on 8 November 2023)	
7 November 2023	CM	(England) Jay Glover	(England) Spennymoor Town	5 December 2023	
4 December 2023	DF	(Republic of Ireland) Ciaran Brennan	(England) Hartlepool United	5 January 2024	
5 January 2024	DM	(England) Tyreeq Bakinson	(England) Charlton Athletic	End of season	
1 February 2024	CM	(Scotland) George Byers	(England) Blackpool	End of season	

=== Contracts ===
Date	Pos	Player	Length	Expiry	Ref
2 June 2023	CM	(Scotland) Barry Bannan	One-year option	June 2024	
2 June 2023	CM	(Scotland) George Byers	One-year option	June 2024	
2 June 2023	CF	(England) Lee Gregory	One-year option	June 2024	
2 June 2023	CD	(England) Dominic Iorfa	One-year option	June 2024	
2 June 2023	RB	(Scotland) Liam Palmer	One-year option	June 2024	
2 June 2023	CF	(England) Josh Windass	One-year option	June 2024	
8 June 2023	CF	(Scotland) Callum Paterson	—	—	
1 July 2023	LM	(England) Marvin Johnson	—	—	
1 July 2023	CM	(England) Jay Glover	—	—	
1 July 2023	CB	(England) Mackenzie Maltby	—	—	
11 July 2023	LB	(England) Cian Flannery	—	—	
25 August 2023	RW	(Zimbabwe) Joey Phuthi	—	—	
11 December 2023	CF	(England) Bailey Cadamarteri	—	—	
13 May 2024	CM	(England) Jay Buchan	One-year option	June 2025	
13 May 2024	LB	(England) Cian Flannery	One-year option	June 2025	
13 May 2024	RW	(England) Favour Onukwuli	One-year option	June 2025	
13 May 2024	RW	(Zimbabwe) Joey Phuthi	One-year option	June 2025	
13 May 2024	LB	(England) Sam Reed	One-year option	June 2025	
17 May 2024	GK	(Northern Ireland) Pierce Charles	—	—	
17 May 2024	LB	(England) Marvin Johnson	One-year option	June 2025	
17 May 2024	CF	(Scotland) Callum Paterson	One-year option	June 2025	
21 May 2024	CB	(Republic of Ireland) Gabriel Otegbayo	—	—	
31 May 2024	CM	(Scotland) Barry Bannan	—	—	
31 May 2024	RB	(Scotland) Liam Palmer	—	—	

== Squad statistics ==
=== Appearances ===
As of 4 May 2024

No.	Pos	Nat	Player	Total		Championship		FA Cup		EFL Cup	
No.	Pos	Nat	Player	Apps	Goals	Apps	Goals	Apps	Goals	Apps	Goals
1	GK	(England) ENG	Cameron Dawson	20	0	18	0	1	0	1	0
2	DF	(Scotland) SCO	Liam Palmer	38	3	25+9	2	1+2	1	0+1	0
3	DF	(Denmark) DEN	Kristian Pedersen	4	0	1+3	0	0	0	0	0
4	MF	(Wales) WAL	Will Vaulks	37	0	25+9	0	1	0	1+1	0
5	DF	(Senegal) SEN	Bambo Diaby	35	0	26+8	0	0	0	1	0
6	DF	(England) ENG	Dominic Iorfa	30	0	20+8	0	0	0	1+1	0
7	FW	(England) ENG	Mallik Wilks	18	1	1+14	0	1+2	1	0	0
8	MF	(Scotland) SCO	George Byers	22	1	17+5	1	0	0	0	0
9	FW	(England) ENG	Lee Gregory	14	1	10+2	1	0	0	1+1	0
10	MF	(Scotland) SCO	Barry Bannan	45	1	41+1	1	1	0	2	0
11	FW	(England) ENG	Josh Windass	28	7	22+3	6	1	1	1+1	0
12	FW	(Canada) CAN	Iké Ugbo	19	7	17+1	7	1	0	0	0
13	FW	(Scotland) SCO	Callum Paterson	27	0	17+8	0	0	0	1+1	0
14	DF	(Spain) ESP	Pol Valentín	40	0	24+12	0	2	0	2	0
15	DF	(Chile) CHI	Juan Delgado	12	1	9+1	1	0	0	1+1	0
17	DF	(Jamaica) JAM	Di'Shon Bernard	36	0	30+2	0	2+1	0	1	0
18	MF	(England) ENG	Marvin Johnson	30	4	25+4	4	1	0	0	0
19	MF	(England) ENG	Tyreeq Bakinson	10	1	3+5	0	0	0	1+1	1
20	DF	(England) ENG	Michael Ihiekwe	29	1	22+4	1	2	0	1	0
22	MF	(Republic of Ireland) IRL	Jeff Hendrick	12	1	5+6	1	0+1	0	0	0
23	DF	(England) ENG	Akin Famewo	39	0	30+5	0	3	0	1	0
24	FW	(England) ENG	Michael Smith	34	4	11+20	4	0+2	0	0+1	0
25	DF	(Brazil) BRA	Gui Siqueira	3	0	0	0	1+2	0	0	0
26	GK	(England) ENG	James Beadle	19	0	19	0	0	0	0	0
27	FW	(England) ENG	Ashley Fletcher	28	0	4+19	0	2+1	0	2	0
30	DF	(England) ENG	Sean Fusire	1	0	0	0	0	0	0+1	0
31	MF	(England) ENG	Rio Shipston	1	0	0	0	0+1	0	0	0
33	DF	(England) ENG	Reece James	11	0	3+5	0	1+1	0	1	0
34	DF	(Zimbabwe) ZIM	Joey Phuthi	2	0	0+1	0	0+1	0	0	0
36	FW	(Colombia) COL	Ian Poveda	10	0	8+2	0	0	0	0	0
39	DF	(England) ENG	Sam Reed	1	0	0	0	0+1	0	0	0
41	FW	(France) FRA	Djeidi Gassama	37	4	14+21	3	2	1	0	0
42	FW	(England) ENG	Bailey-Tye Cadamarteri	25	5	14+9	4	2	1	0	0
44	MF	(France) FRA	Momo Diaby	11	0	2+6	0	3	0	0	0
45	FW	(Netherlands) NED	Anthony Musaba	48	8	29+14	7	3	0	2	1
47	GK	(Northern Ireland) NIR	Pierce Charles	2	0	0	0	2	0	0	0
Players that left the club mid-season:
21	MF	(England) ENG	John Buckley	13	0	5+8	0	0	0	0	0
36	GK	(Colombia) COL	Devis Vásquez	10	0	9	0	0	0	1	0

=== Goalscorers ===
As of 4 May 2024

Includes all competitive matches.

Rank	Pos.	Nat.	No.	Player	Championship	FA Cup	EFL Cup	Total
1	FW	(Netherlands)	45	Anthony Musaba	7	0	1	8
2	FW	(England)	11	Josh Windass	6	1	0	7
2	FW	(Canada)	12	Iké Ugbo	7	0	0	7
3	FW	(England)	42	Bailey-Tye Cadamarteri	4	1	0	5
4	MF	(England)	18	Marvin Johnson	4	0	0	4
4	FW	(England)	24	Michael Smith	4	0	0	4
4	FW	(France)	41	Djeidi Gassama	3	1	0	4
5	DF	(Scotland)	2	Liam Palmer	2	1	0	3
6	FW	(England)	7	Mallik Wilks	0	1	0	1
6	MF	(Scotland)	8	George Byers	1	0	0	1
6	FW	(England)	9	Lee Gregory	1	0	0	1
6	MF	(Scotland)	10	Barry Bannan	1	0	0	1
6	DF	(Chile)	15	Juan Delgado	1	0	0	1
6	MF	(England)	19	Tyreeq Bakinson	0	0	1	1
6	DF	(England)	20	Michael Ihiekwe	1	0	0	1
6	MF	(Republic of Ireland)	22	Jeff Hendrick	1	0	0	1
6	Own goals				1	1	0	2
Total					44	6	2	52

=== Disciplinary record ===
As of 4 May 2024

No.	Pos.	Name	Championship		FA Cup		EFL Cup		Total				
No.	Pos.	Name	10	MF	Barry Bannan	11	1	0	0	0	0	11	1
17	DF	Di'Shon Bernard	8	1	1	0	0	0	9	1			
5	DF	Bambo Diaby	2	1	0	0	0	0	2	1			
27	FW	Ashley Fletcher	1	1	1	0	0	0	2	1			
8	MF	George Byers	1	1	0	0	0	0	1	1			
4	MF	Will Vaulks	10	0	0	0	1	0	11	0			
23	DF	Akin Famewo	8	0	1	0	0	0	9	0			
2	DF	Liam Palmer	8	0	0	0	0	0	8	0			
11	FW	Josh Windass	7	0	0	0	0	0	7	0			
13	FW	Callum Paterson	6	0	0	0	1	0	7	0			
18	MF	Marvin Johnson	6	0	0	0	0	0	6	0			
45	FW	Anthony Musaba	6	0	0	0	0	0	6	0			
15	DF	Juan Delgado	4	0	0	0	0	0	4	0			
20	DF	Michael Ihiekwe	4	0	0	0	0	0	4	0			
1	GK	Cameron Dawson	3	0	0	0	0	0	3	0			
7	FW	Mallik Wilks	2	0	1	0	0	0	3	0			
14	DF	Pol Valentín	2	0	0	0	1	0	3	0			
22	MF	Jeff Hendrick	3	0	0	0	0	0	3	0			
24	FW	Michael Smith	2	0	0	0	1	0	3	0			
41	FW	Djeidi Gassama	3	0	0	0	0	0	3	0			
9	FW	Lee Gregory	2	0	0	0	0	0	2	0			
44	MF	Momo Diaby	1	0	1	0	0	0	2	0			
3	DF	Kristian Pedersen	1	0	0	0	0	0	1	0			
6	DF	Dominic Iorfa	1	0	0	0	0	0	1	0			
12	FW	Iké Ugbo	1	0	0	0	0	0	1	0			
19	MF	Tyreeq Bakinson	0	0	0	0	1	0	1	0			
25	DF	Gui Siqueira	0	0	1	0	0	0	1	0			
26	GK	James Beadle	1	0	0	0	0	0	1	0			
36	GK	Devis Vásquez	1	0	0	0	0	0	1	0			

=== Clean sheets ===
As of 4 May 2024

No.	Nat.	Player	Matches played	Clean sheet %	Championship	FA Cup	EFL Cup	TOTAL
1	(England)	Cameron Dawson	20	25%	4	1	0	5
26	(England)	James Beadle	19	42.11%	8	0	0	8
36	(Colombia)	Devis Vásquez	10	10%	1	0	0	1
47	(Northern Ireland)	Pierce Charles	2	0%	0	0	0	0

== Awards ==
=== Club Player of the Year ===
Player of the Year award for the 2023–24 season.

First	%	Second	%	Third	%	Ref.
(Wales) Will Vaulks	29%	(Scotland) Barry Bannan	17%	(Jamaica) Di'Shon Bernard	15%	

=== Sky Bet Championship Manager of the Month ===
Month	Manager		Ref.
December	(Germany) Danny Röhl	Nomination	
April	(Germany) Danny Röhl	Nomination	

=== Sky Bet Championship Player of the Month ===
Month	Player		Ref.
February	(Canada) Iké Ugbo	Nomination	

=== EFL Young Player of the Month ===
Month	Manager		Ref.
December	(England) Bailey-Tye Cadamarteri	Winner	

=== Sky Bet Championship Goal of the Month ===
Month	Player	Goal		Ref
April	(England) Josh Windass	6' vs Blackburn Rovers, 21 April	Winner	

=== EFL Championship Player in the Community ===
Player		Ref.
(Wales) Will Vaulks	Winner	

=== EFL Player in the Community ===
Player		Ref.
(Wales) Will Vaulks	Winner	
