= Chester F.C. =

English association football club

Coordinates: 53°11′21″N 2°55′26″W

- Full name: Chester Football Club
- Nicknames: The Seals; The Blues
- Founded: 20 May 2010; 16 years ago
- Ground: Deva Stadium
- Capacity: 5,400
- Owner: City Fans United
- Chairman: Nick Phillipson
- Manager: Phil Parkinson
- League: National League North
- 2025–26: National League North, 7th of 24
- Website: chesterfc.com
Home colours	Away colours

Chester Football Club is an English association football club based in Chester. They are currently members of the National League North, the sixth tier of English football, and play at the Deva Stadium.

The club was reformed in 2010 following the liquidation of Chester City. In its inaugural season it competed in Division One North of the Northern Premier League, following a successful appeal to the Football Association against its initial placement in the North West Counties League. After winning this division, it then won the Northern League Premier Division in 2011–12 and the Conference North in 2012–13. Chester returned to the National League North following relegation in 2017–18.

== History ==
=== Background and formation ===
The original Chester FC was founded in 1885 and joined the Football League before the 1931–32 season. They changed their name to Chester City in 1983. They were members of the Football League, predominantly in its fourth tier but occasionally in its third tier, until 2000 when the club was relegated to the Football Conference. They returned to the Football League after winning the Conference title in 2003–04. Following relegation back to the Conference in 2009, the club hit financial difficulties. These financial difficulties led to the season starting with a 25-point deduction, following the Inland Revenue overturning a proposed CVA. Chester City were eventually wound up on 10 March 2010.

City Fans United (CFU) had been formed in October 2009, following growing disquiet among fans with the running of Chester City, who at that point were already in deep financial trouble. Only a month after the official formation of CFU, fans staged an on-pitch protest about Chester City's ownership, leading to the abandonment of the game against Eastbourne Borough at a point when Chester were leading 3–2. Following a vote of its membership, CFU in January 2010 called for a boycott of Chester City, after the dismissal of the then manager Jim Harvey, which led to CFU expressing its "disappointment, shock, and anger" at the decision. The group then began preparations in February 2010 to form a phoenix club for the following season just weeks before Chester City FC was wound up.

Following the official winding up of Chester City in March 2010, a ballot was held to choose the name for the new club. Over 1,000 people participated in the ballot and 70% voted for the name Chester FC, which had been the old club's name for its first 98 years. The club received the support of Cheshire West and Chester Council, which granted the lease of the Deva Stadium (subsequently renamed the Exacta Stadium as part of a sponsorship arrangement), Chester City's former ground, to Chester FC in May 2010.

Chester FC started competing in the 2010–11 season. The FA initially recommended that they should be placed in the North West Counties Football League Premier Division, a decision that the club appealed against. On 18 June 2010, the FA made a statement saying that Chester would instead be placed a step higher and would play in the Northern Premier League Division One North, the 8th tier of the English football league system.

=== Neil Young (2010–14) ===
The club was formally relaunched on 20 May 2010, when Neil Young was announced as the first manager of the club. A pre-season friendly played at Colwyn Bay on 10 July 2010 was the first fixture for the new club, the match resulting in a 2–1 victory for Colwyn Bay. The team's first home friendly was played against Aberystwyth Town, which the Blues won 3–0. The club's first league match was on 24 August 2010, away at Warrington Town. Rob Hopley scored the first ever goal for the club in the 6th minute, but the game ended in a 1–1 draw. Chester played their first home game against Trafford and won 6–0, Michael Wilde scoring a hat-trick. In September, Chester lost their first game after a 2–1 home defeat to Chorley. Chester went top of their division for the first time following a 2–1 win at Cammell Laird in October, before equalling their record win when they beat Ossett Albion 6–0 in January 2011, and recording their ninth consecutive away win at Trafford in the same month. Chester were ineligible to compete in either the FA Trophy and FA Cup during their inaugural season due to FA rules requiring a minimum of one season of prior football before playing in the Trophy, and two years before playing in the Cup. After their win at promotion rivals Skelmersdale in March, the Blues went 12 points clear at the top of the league, but a number of draws and defeats led to this margin being cut to just a single point by 16 April. Second-placed Skelmersdale then dropped points, to leave Chester three points clear with one remaining game, and a goal difference eight ahead of their chasing rivals. In a wild finale to the season, Chester were promoted by only a single point of goal difference, as the Blues went down to a shock 2–1 defeat at Garforth Town, while Skelmersdale thrashed Ossett Albion 7–2, with two goals from Ossett striker Danny Toronczak the difference between promotion and the playoffs for Chester.

Chart of yearly table positions of Chester in the English football league system.

Following Chester's promotion to the NPL Premier Division, form was initially variable, with two losses in their first six league fixtures. However, form, particularly defensively, improved greatly, with no goals conceded in September, and the 1–0 win against Chasetown was their seventh successive clean sheet in the league. This run ended after a 1–1 draw away at Buxton in the next match, but only after they established a new Chester City/Chester FC record of 781 minutes without conceding across eight games in all competitions. Chester's form was strong through November and December, with a run of five consecutive victories, resulting in Chester going top of the table after the 1–0 win against Ashton United, a position the club held at the end of the year, finishing 2011 with a stormy 1–1 draw at second placed Northwich Victoria, a game that saw three dismissals. They were not to be caught again in the league during the season. During the calendar year 2011, Chester were unbeaten in home league fixtures. Chester's last loss of the season came in their 2–1 home defeat to Hednesford on 21 January. After that point, the team went on a 16-match unbeaten run, including a period of eight consecutive victories encompassing the entirety of March. On 9 April 2012, Chester gained their second successive promotion, after a late goal from Matty McGinn in the game against second-placed Northwich gave the club a 1–1 draw and the point they needed to see off the challenge with three games remaining. The game was watched by a crowd of 5,009, which was not only a record for the reformed club, but also the highest gate ever recorded in the seventh tier of English football. At the conclusion of the season, Chester finished with 100 points, 17 clear of second-placed Northwich, having scored 102 goals along the way, and conceded only 29. In the 2011–12 FA Trophy, Chester went on an extended run, winning through three qualifying rounds to reach the first round proper, where they recorded a 5–1 away victory against North Ferriby United. They bowed out of the competition in the second round in an away tie against Conference Premier side Ebbsfleet United, losing 3–2. As this was only the club's second season, they remained ineligible for the FA Cup.

Chester began the 2012–13 season as second favourites with bookmakers for the Conference North title. Their start to the season justified those predictions, as they won their first seven matches, a club record for Chester FC and also surpassing Chester City's best start to the season. Included in that run were victories over pre-season favourites FC Halifax Town and a 4–0 drubbing of previously unbeaten Guiseley. Despite this, the club only sat in second place in the division, as Brackley Town also won each of their first seven games. The run came to an end with a 3–2 defeat at Boston United in Chester's eighth match. After two more victories, against Stalybridge Celtic and Bishop's Stortford, Chester went to the top of the table for the first time due to a 1–1 draw with Bradford Park Avenue. Following this draw, Chester then went on a run of twelve consecutive league victories, including a 3–2 win at Brackley. This run came to an end with a goalless draw, again against Bradford PA on 5 January, which was also the first league match of the season in which Chester failed to score. Chester were promoted to the Conference Premier following their 1–0 win at home to Boston United. In the FA Cup, Chester FC's first ever match was a 1–1 draw away at Gainsborough Trinity in the second qualifying round. Chester won the replay at the Exacta Stadium 2–1 with goals from Dominic Collins and Levi Mackin. Chester's third qualifying round tie, at home to Halifax, was marred by crowd trouble, and finished in a 1–1 draw. Chester exited the FA Cup following a 3–1 win by Halifax at The Shay in the replay. The FA Trophy proved less successful for Chester than in the previous season, as the Blues failed to win a single match, exiting in a replay at Worksop Town. On 6 April 2013, Chester were confirmed as champions of the Conference North, beating Boston United 1–0 at the Exacta through a Lewis Turner header, winning a third successive title, and in doing so, becoming the first club in English football history to achieve three successive promotions. Three promotions in their first three years means that Chester will play their next season's football in the Conference Premier, the level from which their predecessors Chester City were expelled in 2010. Chester set several league records for the Conference North in this prolific season: most wins (34), fewest defeats (3), most points (107), most goals scored (103), best goal difference (+71) and also the longest unbeaten streak (30 games).

=== Conference Premier (2013–18) ===
As expected, for the 2013–14 season, Chester remained as a semi-professional club, despite the presence of a number of full-time clubs in the Conference Premier. Before the season, bookmakers had high expectations for the Blues, with bookmakers making them eighth favourites for the Conference title. However, the season started with the Blues in terrible form, with five consecutive defeats. Their losing run ended with a 2–0 away win against arch rivals Wrexham. This was the first Cross-border derby match since Chester had reformed. However, by the end of December Chester were still in the relegation zone with only four wins. On 8 January manager Neil Young left Chester by mutual consent after three and a half seasons. On 18 January 2014, Steve Burr was appointed as Young's replacement. Chester finished the season in 21st place and were relegated on goal difference. However, they were reprieved on 10 June after Hereford United, the team who finished above Chester in 20th place, were expelled from the Conference Premier due to financial irregularities.

Chester started the 2014–15 season poorly but gradually started to pick their form up over a 4-month period. Chester's form dipped slightly throughout February, March and the start of April, leading to them slipping down the table away from the play-off places. They ended the season in 12th place with 63 points.

Chester played in the National league (originally named Conference Premier) for the duration of their 2015–16 season, where they picked up 8 wins and 6 draws from their first 23 matches to position themselves at 14th for the first half of the season. However, a dip in form saw Chester pick up 11 losses in their remaining fixtures. With four games remaining in the season, Chester sacked Steve Burr and he was replaced by his assistant manager, Jon McCarthy. Three wins in the final three games of the season however saw Chester finish in 17th with 54 points. Chester's form declined even more in 2016–17 which saw them finish 19th at the end of the season with 52 points; just 4 above the relegation zone.

Chester's fortune in the National league finally turned sour in the 2017–18 season. In January, Chester were on the brink of being dissolved, as they revealed that they needed to raise £50,000 in the short term in order to stay afloat. Chester FC fans raised over £100,000 via a number of fundraising activities including an all-stars game supported by Michael Owen and Ian Rush which ensured that the club would survive. However, following a 2–0 defeat to Tranmere Rovers, Chester were relegated from the National league, eventually finishing 23rd. At the end of the 2017–18 season, manager Marcus Bignot left the club by mutual consent.

=== National League North (2018–present) ===
Bignot was replaced by joint managers Anthony Johnson and Bernard Morley. Chester also gained Swansway Group as a new sponsor in the 2017–18 season, which resulted in their stadium gaining the nickname, the Swansway Chester Stadium (commonly known as the Deva Stadium). Chester had a promising start to their 2018–19 season in the National League North, as they gained 7 wins from their first 15 matches. In the same period of time though, Chester suffered one of their heaviest defeats in decades; losing 8–1 to Blyth Spartans. Overall, Chester achieved a solid 16-14-12 record, which elevated them to 9th on the table with 62 points, three points off a play-off spot. In the FA Cup, Chester were defeated 4–3 in the third qualifying round by ninth tier Dunston UTS.

In the following season, Chester finished in 6th place after a decision to end the season in March due to the disruption caused by the COVID-19 pandemic. The season was finished on a points per game basis, with Chester losing out 3–2 in the play-offs to Altrincham. In January 2021, the National League North season was declared null and void with Chester in 3rd place after 17 matches.

Steve Watson was appointed manager on 23 December 2021 but left the club by mutual consent at the end of the season.

On 12 May 2022, the club's former academy head coach Calum McIntyre was appointed as the new first team coach at the age of 28. During his tenure, he led Chester to two play-off campaigns including a play-off final, losing to Scunthorpe United in extra time. The Seals also made an appearance in the first round proper of the FA Cup for the first time since the 2014–15 season, losing to York City away in a replay.

Due to a difficult season following Chester's play-off defeat, it was decided that McIntyre would leave the club following the end of his contract at the end of the 2025–26 season. On 28 February 2026, McIntyre left his role as first team manager by mutual consent following a 2–1 home win against Spennymoor Town. On 1 March 2026, it was announced that first team coach and player Connell Rawlinson would takeup the job on an interim basis. Rawlinson guided Chester to a 7th place finish, inside the play-off places but his side lost in an away tie to Macclesfield 2–1.

On 4th May 2026, Chester announced Phil Parkinson as their new first-team manager on a two-year contract.He kicked off his tenure with a 2-1 away win over Chorley.

== Crest and colours ==
=== Crest ===
The crest was designed by Martin Huxley, a Chester-based graphic artist and Chester F.C. fan, who described the symbols in the crest thus: "The Wolf dates back to when William the Conqueror's nephew, Hugh d'Avranches was appointed the Earl of Chester. He had the nickname 'Lupus', the Latin translation for 'wolf'. The crown refers to Chester being a royalist City. Badge variations make it unclear whether the leaves are laurel, a recognised symbol of victory, or oak, a significant (and common) tree in Chester. Oak has long been used in the Cheshire Regiment's logo, reference to saving King George II's life beneath an oak tree at the Battle of Dettingen in 1743."

In keeping with the club's crest, Chester's mascot is a friendly wolf called 'Big Lupus'.

=== Colours ===
Chester play in blue and white top with black shorts and blue socks, similar to their predecessors Chester City. For their first two seasons their shirts were made by sportswear company Joma; from the 2012–13 season the kit was made by Puma until a new three year kit deal with Kappa was made in 2019, while since reformation the club's kit has been sponsored by MBNA. The Blues' away shirt colour has changed on a bi-annual basis, having been purple in their first season, yellow in 2011–12 and green in 2012–13. The new home kit was chosen by the fans and the away kit was designed by a Junior Blue via a competition.

=== Shirt sponsors and manufacturers ===
Period	Kit Manufacturer	Shirt Sponsor
2010–2012	Joma	MBNA
2012–2015	Puma	MBNA
2015–2020	Puma	MBNA & Skywheels Group
2020–2023	Kappa	MBNA & Precision Facades
2023–	Hope + Glory	MBNA & Precision Facades

== Stadium ==
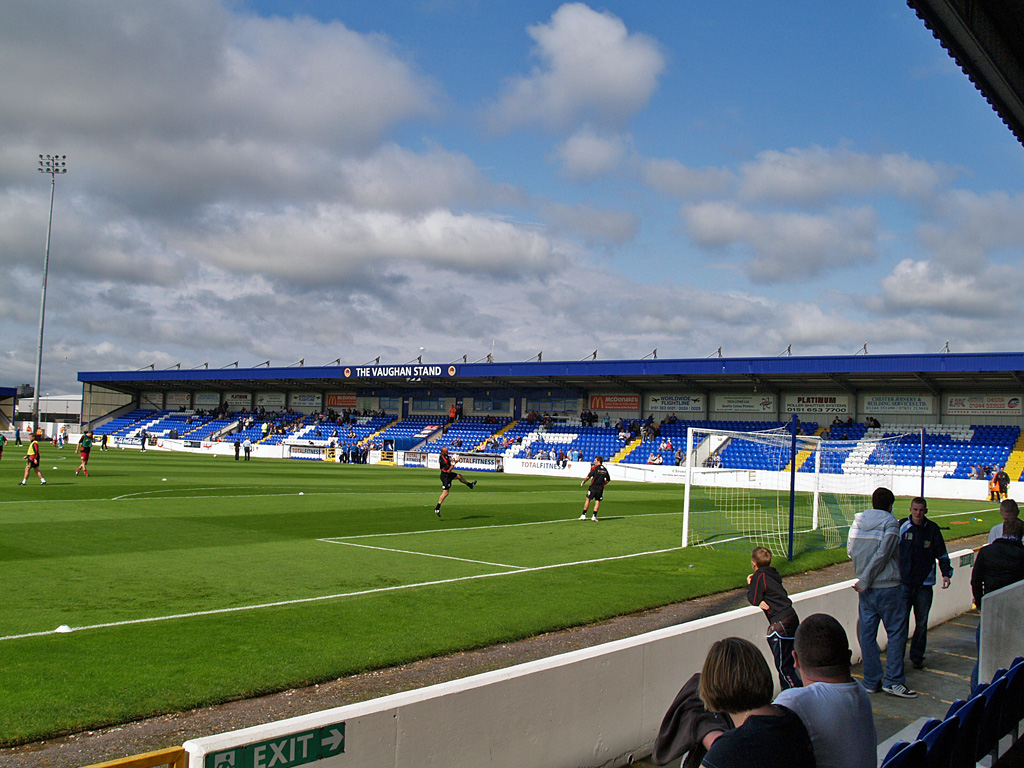
Chester's home ground is The Deva Stadium

Chester F.C. play at the Deva Stadium, the home of their predecessor. It has a capacity of 6,500 with 4,170 seated. The stadium was leased to the club by Cheshire West and Chester Council.

The highest home league attendance at the Stadium was in April 2012 against Northwich Victoria, with a crowd of 5,009.

=== England–Wales border ===
The stadium is located in the Sealand Road Industrial Estate and straddles the England-Wales border. The pitch and all of the stands are in Flintshire, Wales, though the stadium car park, main entrance, and some of the offices are in England. In January 2022, the club was threatened with legal action by North Wales Police and Flintshire County Council for failing to apply the COVID-19 regulations applying in Wales and allowing crowds to attend matches at the ground. On 8 January 2022, the Welsh Government stated that, as the stadium was in Wales it was subject to Wales' COVID restrictions, and Andy Morris, the club chairman, said that the location of the ground "had become a very real problem".

== Rivals ==
The club's predominant rival is Wrexham, as the two clubs are 12 miles apart from each other. In league competitions, the two clubs have met each other 86 times (10 following the liquidation of Chester City). Chester also inherited several rivalries from its predecessor including: Macclesfield Town, Tranmere Rovers, Crewe Alexandra and Shrewsbury Town. During Chester's early years, they formed rivalries with local clubs such as: Vauxhall Motors, Witton Albion, Warrington Town, Nantwich Town, and Northwich Victoria. On Chester's way back to the National League, they also formed smaller rivalries with North-West based sides Chorley and Southport.

== Players ==
=== Current squad ===
22:52, 6 November 2026 Note: Flags indicate national team as defined under FIFA eligibility rules; some limited exceptions apply. Players may hold more than one non-FIFA nationality.

No.	Pos.	Nation	Player
1	GK	ENG	Luke Hewitson
2	DF	SCO	George Burroughs
3	DF	ENG	Nathan Woodthorpe
4	MF	WAL	Declan Weeks (captain)
5	DF	IRL	Jake Griffin
7	FW	ENG	Tom Peers
8	MF	ENG	Jack Bainbridge
10	MF	ENG	Dominic McHale
11	FW	ENG	Billy Waters
12	MF	ENG	Dan Ward
13	GK	ENG	Billy Davies
14	MF	ENG	Connor Murphy
15	DF	ENG	Isaac Burgess

No.	Pos.	Nation	Player
16	DF	IRL	Sam Foley
17	FW	ENG	Connor Woods
19	FW	ENG	Jefferson Abreu
20	MF	ENG	Ma’kel Campbell
22	GK	ENG	Alex Brown
23	FW	ENG	Oskar Rosenblatt
24	DF	ENG	Ben Lomax
26	FW	ENG	Joe Boggan (on loan from Livingston until May 2027)
28	MF	ENG	Alfie Jones-Mellor
29	FW	ENG	Noah Bell (on loan from Crewe until December 2026)
31	FW	ENG	Kofi Moore
33	DF	ENG	Sam Reed
34	MF	ENG	Ruben Butt (on loan from Salford until January 2027)
37	DF	NED	Wesley Frimpong

==== Out on loan ====
Note: Flags indicate national team as defined under FIFA eligibility rules; some limited exceptions apply. Players may hold more than one non-FIFA nationality.

No.	Pos.	Nation	Player
9	FW	SKN	Jacob Hazel (on loan at Darlington until December 2026)
18	MF	ENG	Dan Kennedy (on loan at Kidsgrove until May 2027)
21	DF	ENG	Harry Deakin (on loan at Vauxhall Motors until May 2027)

=== International appearances ===
The following table shows players who have received an international cap while playing for the club (including substitutions) arranged alphabetically by nation in descending order:

Time at Club	Player	Nation	Appearances	Goals	Ref.
2022–2024	(Bermuda) Kole Hall	Bermuda	5	0	
2016–2017	(England) James Alabi	England C	2	0	
2017–2018	(England) Tom Crawford	England C	1	0	
2014–2016	(England) Ben Heneghan	England C	3	0	
2014–2015	(England) Kingsley James	England C	3	1	
2010, 2011–2013	(England) Antoni Sarcevic	England C	1	1	
2022–2024	(England) Wyll Stanway	England C	1	0	
2013–2014	(Gibraltar) Danny Higginbotham	Gibraltar	1	0	
2015	(Northern Ireland) Jamie McDonagh	Northern Ireland U21s	1	0	
2022	(Scotland) Robert Apter	Scotland U19s	3	0	
2015	(Scotland) Oli McBurnie	Scotland U19s	3	1	
2025–2026	(Wales) Lewys Benjamin	Wales U21s	3	0	

=== Chester FC 'Team of the Decade' ===

Chester F.C. all-time first XI

Chester fans were asked for a vote for their team of the decade (2010-2019) strongest squad. A starting XI as well as seven subs were asked to be voted for.

==== Starting XI ====
- (England) John Danby (2011–14)
- (England) Ben Heneghan (2014–16)
- (England) George Horan (2010–14)
- (England) Sam Hughes (2015–17)
- (Scotland) Matty McGinn (2011, 2011–13)
- (Republic of Ireland) Craig Mahon (2013–20)
- (England) Antoni Sarcevic (2010, 2011–13)
- (England) Sean McConville (2014–15)
- (England) Iain Howard (2010–13)
- (England) Michael Wilde (2010–12)
- (Netherlands) Akwasi Asante (2019, 2019–20)

==== Substitutes ====
- (Scotland) Matt Glennon (2012)
- (England) Lewis Turner (2013, 2013–14)
- (England) Joel Taylor (2019–20, 2023–24)
- (England) Bradley Jackson (2018–20)
- (England) Alex Brown (2011–12)
- (England) Ross Hannah (2015–16, 2017–18)
- (England) Chris Simm (2011–12)

Updated 16 July 2025.

== Management ==
=== Current management and coaching staff ===
As of 13 October 2026

Name	Role
(England) Phil Parkinson	Manager
(England) Neil Sorvel	Assistant Manager
(England) Paul Tait	Youth Team Manager
Graeme Hewitt	Goalkeeper Coach
James Williams	Head of Physical Performance
Cerys Parsons	Senior Sports Therapsist
Milly Peel	Head of Wellness & Psychotherapy
Glen Boden	First Team Performance Analyst
Tom Saunders	Nutritionist
Tommy Uda	Consultant Physiotherapist

=== Managerial history ===
As of 10:00, 18 November 2026

Name	From	To	Played	Won	Drawn	Lost	Win %	Honours
(England) Neil Young	20 May 2010	8 Jan 2014	182	114	35	33	62.64	NPL Division One North Champions 2010–11; Supporters Direct Cup Winners 2011; NPL Premier Division Champions 2011–12; Peter Swales Shield Winners 2012; Cheshire Senior Cup Winners 2012–13; Conference North Champions 2012–13
(England) Gary Jones (caretaker)	8 Jan 2014	18 Jan 2014	1	1	0	0	100.00	
(Scotland) Steve Burr	18 Jan 2014	7 Apr 2016	125	45	26	54	36.00	
(Northern Ireland) Jon McCarthy (caretaker)	7 Apr 2016	7 May 2016	4	3	0	1	75.00	
(Northern Ireland) Jon McCarthy	7 May 2016	6 Sep 2017	58	16	15	27	27.59	
(England) Tom Shaw (caretaker)	6 Sep 2017	20 Sep 2017	3	0	1	2	00.00	
(England) Marcus Bignot	20 Sep 2017	11 Apr 2018	36	6	10	20	16.67	
(England) Calum McIntyre (caretaker)	11 Apr 2018	15 May 2018	3	1	0	2	33.33	
(England) Anthony Johnson & (England) Bernard Morley	15 May 2018	24 Nov 2021	131	54	37	40	41.22	Supporters Direct Shield Winners 2019
(England) Danny Livesey (caretaker)	24 Nov 2021	23 Dec 2021	3	1	0	2	33.33	
(England) Steve Watson	23 Dec 2021	7 May 2022	25	7	7	11	28.00	
(England) Calum McIntyre	12 May 2022	28 Feb 2026	208	91	68	49	43.75	
(Wales) Connell Rawlinson (interim)	1 Mar 2026	4 May 2026	11	7	2	2	63.64	
(England) Phil Parkinson	4 May 2026	present	21	11	2	8	52.38	

Includes all league and cup competitions

== Honours ==
League

- Conference North (level 6)
  - Champions: 2012–13
- Northern Premier League Premier Division (level 7)
  - Champions: 2011–12
- Northern Premier League Division One North (level 8)
  - Champions: 2010–11

Cup

- Cheshire Senior Cup
  - Winners: 2012–13
- Peter Swales Shield
  - Winners: 2012
- Brian Lomax Supporters Direct Cup
  - Winners: 2011
- Supporters Direct Shield
  - Winners: 2019
