= Mohamed Diaby (footballer, born 1996) =

French footballer (born 1996)

Momo Diaby
Personal information
- Full name: Lamine Mohamed Diaby
- Date of birth: 3 September 1996 (age 30)
- Place of birth: Paris, France
- Height: 1.97 m (6 ft 6 in)
- Position: Midfielder

Team information
- Current team: Feirense
- Number: 24

Youth career
- Aubervilliers
- Paris FC
- 2014–2015: Barnet

Senior career*
Years	Team	Apps	(Gls)
2016	Salgueiros	1	(0)
2016–2017	Santa Clara	0	(0)
2016–2017	→ Ideal (loan)	15	(3)
2018–2022	Paços de Ferreira	76	(4)
2022–2025	Portimonense	45	(1)
2023–2024	→ Sheffield Wednesday (loan)	8	(0)
2026	Chania	7	(0)
2026–	Feirense	1	(0)
- * Club domestic league appearances and goals as of 13 September 2026

Lamine Mohamed Diaby, known as Momo Diaby (born 3 September 1996) is a French professional footballer who plays for Liga Portugal 2 club Feirense.

== Club career ==
=== Sheffield Wednesday (loan) ===
On 11 August 2023, Diaby joined Sheffield Wednesday on a season-long loan with the option-to-buy. Diaby made his debut on 19 August 2023 against Preston North End, but came off with a serious injury which would see him have an extended spell on the sidelines. He returned from his injury on 1 January 2024, coming off the bench against Hull City.

== Career statistics ==
As of 15 December 2024.

Club	Division	Season	League		National Cup		League Cup		Other		Total	
Club	Division	Season	Apps	Goals	Apps	Goals	Apps	Goals	Apps	Goals	Apps	Goals
Paços de Ferreira	Liga Portugal 2	2018–19	20	1	4	0	1	0	—		25	1
Paços de Ferreira	Primeira Liga	2019–20	27	2	3	1	4	0	—		34	3
Paços de Ferreira	Primeira Liga	2020–21	16	1	2	0	1	0	—		19	1
Paços de Ferreira	Primeira Liga	2021–22	13	0	0	0	0	0	—		13	0
Paços de Ferreira	Total		76	4	9	1	6	0	—		91	5
Portimonense	Primeira Liga	2022–23	25	1	1	0	2	0	—		28	1
Portimonense	Primeira Liga	2023–24	0	0	0	0	2	0	—		2	0
Portimonense	Primeira Liga	2024–25	9	0	0	0	2	0	—		11	0
Portimonense	Total		34	1	1	0	6	0	—		41	1
Sheffield Wednesday (loan)	EFL Championship	2023–24	8	0	3	0	0	0	—		11	0
Career Total			118	5	13	1	12	0	0	0	143	6
