= Sam Reed (footballer) =

English footballer (born 2003)

Samuel Reed
Personal information
- Full name: Samuel James Reed
- Date of birth: 27 March 2003 (age 23)
- Place of birth: Sheffield, England
- Height: 6 ft 2 in (1.87 m)
- Position: Left back

Team information
- Current team: Chester

Youth career
- 2009–2013: Young Owls JFC
- 2013–2016: Sheffield United
- 2016–2019: Young Owls JFC

Senior career*
Years	Team	Apps	(Gls)
2019–2023	Brighouse Town	82	(2)
2023–2025	Sheffield Wednesday	0	(0)
2024–2025	→ Boston United (loan)	4	(0)
2025	→ Scarborough Athletic (loan)	15	(2)
2025–2026	Altrincham	21	(0)
2026–	Chester	17	(2)
- * Club domestic league appearances and goals as of 19:48 21 November 2026 (UTC)

Samuel James Reed is an English professional footballer who plays as a left-back for National League North club Chester.

== Club career ==
=== Early career ===
Reed was with Brighouse Town from the age of 16 and spent 3 years with the club and amassed 82 appearances at Step 4 of the non-league pyramid.

=== Sheffield Wednesday ===
After making 39 appearances for Brighouse Town during the 2022–23 season, making the Northern Premier League East Team of the Season, he joined Sheffield Wednesday on 20 July 2023 following a successful trial, joining the U21 side. He made his Wednesday debut coming off the bench against Coventry City in the FA Cup on 6 February 2023. The option was taken up on his contract to extend his deal at Sheffield Wednesday for another year in May 2024. He was released from his contract following the end of the 2024–25 season.

==== Loans ====
On 26 November 2024, Reed joined National League side, Boston United on loan until January, making his debut the same day, coming off the bench in a 4–0 away defeat to Oldham Athletic. He returned from his loan on the 8 January 2025 having played 5 times for the club.

In February 2025 he joined National League North side Scarborough Athletic on loan for the remainder of the season.

=== Altrincham ===
On 6 June 2025, Reed joined Altrincham. He made his debut in a 3–2 victory on the opening day of the season against Aldershot Town. He was released after just one season at the club.

=== Chester F.C ===
On 5 June 2026, Reed joined National League North side Chester on a two-year-deal. He scored his first goal for the club in a 5-0 away victory over Spennymoor Town.

== Career statistics ==
As of 26 September 2026

Appearances and goals by club, season and competition
Club	Season	League			FA Cup		League Cup		Other		Total	
Club	Season	Division	Apps	Goals	Apps	Goals	Apps	Goals	Apps	Goals	Apps	Goals
Sheffield Wednesday	2023–24	Championship	0	0	1	0	0	0	–		1	0
Sheffield Wednesday	2024–25	Championship	0	0	0	0	0	0	–		0	0
Sheffield Wednesday	Total		0	0	1	0	0	0	0	0	1	0
Boston United (loan)	2024–25	National League	4	0	–		–		1 (Note: Appearance(s) in FA Trophy)	0	5	0
Scarborough Athletic (loan)	2024–25	National League North	15	2	–		–		–		15	2
Altrincham	2025–26	National League	21	0	2	1	–		0	0	23	1
Chester	2026–27	National League North	10	0	0	0	–		0	0	10	0
Career total			50	2	3	1	0	0	1	0	54	3
