= Joey Phuthi =

Zimbabwean footballer (born 2005)

Personal information
- Full name: Joey Phuthi
- Date of birth: 2 January 2005 (age 21)
- Place of birth: Harare, Zimbabwe
- Height: 1.73 m (5 ft 8 in)
- Position: Midfielder

Team information
- Current team: Whitby Town

Youth career
- 2017–2018: Wincobank Juniors
- 2018–2023: Sheffield Wednesday

Senior career*
Years	Team	Apps	(Gls)
2023–2025	Sheffield Wednesday	1	(0)
2025	Eastbourne Borough	10	(0)
2026	Cleethorpes Town	10	(0)
2026–	Whitby Town	12	(3)

International career^{‡}
2024	Zimbabwe	2	(0)
- * Club domestic league appearances and goals as of 14:19, 23 October 2026 (UTC) ‡ National team caps and goals as of 09:00, 1 July 2024 (UTC)

Joey Phuthi (born 2 January 2005) is a Zimbabwean professional footballer who plays as a Midfielder for Whitby Town.

== Club career ==
=== Sheffield Wednesday ===
Phuthi moved from his native Zimbabwe to England at the age of 12. He began playing football with Wincobank Juniors, before moving to the academy of Sheffield Wednesday at 13 and worked his way up their youth categories. He was promoted to their U21s on 14 July 2021 on a scholarship deal, and in the summer of 2023 he joined the senior team for preseason. On 29 August 2023 he signed his first professional contract with Sheffield Wednesday. He made his senior and professional debut with Sheffield Wednesday as a substitute in a 2–0 English Football League loss to Coventry City on 26 December 2023. The option was taken up on his contract to extend his deal at Sheffield Wednesday for another year in May 2024. He was released from his contract following the end of the 2024–25 season. Following his release at Sheffield Wednesday, former teammate Josh Windass would rant about Phuthi on a podcast after a reaction Phuthi gave Windass in training, comparing himself to Lionel Messi as he doesn't run more than 10k a game.

=== Non-league ===
On 20 June 2025, Eastbourne Borough announced the signing of Phuthi, from 1 July 2025 once his Sheffield Wednesday contract has expired. He made his debut on the opening day of the season, coming off the bench against Farnborough, which finished 1–1. He left the club on 5 December 2025 by mutual consent having made 13 appearances.

On 16 January 2026, he joined Northern Premier League Premier Division club Cleethorpes Town. He was released at the end of the season.

On 3 August 2026, he joined Whitby Town following an impressive pre-season trial.

== International career ==
On 12 March 2024, Phuthi was called up to the full Zimbabwe squad to play in the Malawi Four Nations Tournament. He made his international debut for Zimbabwe against Kenya on 26 March 2024.

== Playing style ==
Phuthi can play as a right-back, left-back, or winger.

== Career statistics ==
=== Club ===
As of 10 October 2026

Appearances and goals by club, season and competition
Club	Season	League			FA Cup		League Cup		Other		Total	
Club	Season	Division	Apps	Goals	Apps	Goals	Apps	Goals	Apps	Goals	Apps	Goals
Sheffield Wednesday	2023–24	Championship	1	0	1	0	0	0	–		2	0
Sheffield Wednesday	2024–25	Championship	0	0	0	0	0	0	–		0	0
Sheffield Wednesday	Total		1	0	1	0	0	0	0	0	2	0
Eastbourne Borough	2025–26	National League South	10	0	0	0	–		3 (Note: One appearance in FA Trophy and two appearances in Sussex Senior Cup)	0	13	0
Cleethorpes Town	2025–26	NPL Premier Division	10	0	0	0	–		0	0	10	0
Whitby Town	2026–27	NPL Premier Division	12	3	1	0	–		1 (Note: One appearance in FA Trophy)	0	14	3
Career total			32	3	2	0	0	0	4	0	38	3

=== International ===
As of 30 June 2024

National team	Year	Apps	Goals
Zimbabwe	2024	2	0
Total		2	0
