= 2025–26 RAAL La Louvière season =

RAAL La Louvière
2025–26 season
- Manager: Frédéric Taquin
- Stadium: Easi Arena
- Belgian Pro League: 15th
- Belgian Cup: Quarter-finals
- Highest home attendance: 8,050 vs Standard Liège & Union Saint-Gilloise
- Lowest home attendance: 6,478 vs Club Brugge
- Biggest defeat: La Louvière 0–2 Standard Liège

The 2025–26 season is the ninth in the history of Royal Association Athlétique Louviéroise La Louvière and the club's first-ever season in the Belgian Pro League, the nation's top football division. The team is also competing in the Belgian Cup this season.

== Squad ==
=== Transfers In ===
Pos.	Player	Transferred from	Fee	Date	Source
FW	(Algeria) Mouhamed Belkheir	(Netherlands) Fortuna Sittard	€300,000	1 July 2025	
DF	(France) Matthis Riou	(France) Guingamp	Free	1 July 2025	
FW	(Senegal) Pape Moussa Fall	(France) Metz	Loan	25 July 2025	
DF	(France) Yllan Okou	(France) Bastia	Free	3 August 2025	
DF	(Belgium) Thierry Lutonda	(Netherlands) PEC Zwolle	Undisclosed	7 August 2025	
FW	(Ghana) Jerry Afriyie	(Saudi Arabia) Al Qadsiah	Loan	24 August 2025	

=== Transfers Out ===
Pos.	Player	Transferred to	Fee	Date	Source
DF	(Togo) Fadel Gobitaka	(Belgium) RFC Liège	Free	1 July 2025	
GK	(Belgium) Arno Valkenaers	(Belgium) Mons		1 July 2025	
MF	(France) Thierno Diallo	(Belgium) Olympic Charleroi	Loan	9 July 2025	
FW	(Netherlands) Raphaël Eyongo	(Belgium) Olympic Charleroi	Loan	12 July 2025	
DF	(France) Hady Camara	(Belgium) RFC Seraing	Free	17 July 2025	
DF	(Belgium) Luka Hoedaert	(Belgium) Tubize-Braine	Loan	18 July 2025	
DF	(France) Victor Corneillie	(Belgium) Olympic Charleroi	Free	24 July 2025	
MF	(France) Kenny Nagera	(France) Rodez	Undisclosed	7 August 2025	
DF	(Netherlands) Daan Klomp	(Canada) Cavalry FC	Contract terminated	8 August 2025	
DF	(Belgium) Tristan Loiseaux	(Belgium) Stockay	Free	26 August 2025	

== Friendlies ==
The team held a training camp in the Netherlands.

28 June 2025	La Louvière (Belgium)	0–0	(Luxembourg) FC Differdange 03
	Gillot (red card) 81'

2 July 2025	La Louvière (Belgium)	2–4	(Belgium) Tubize-Braine

5 July 2025	Mechelen (Belgium)	1–0	(Belgium) La Louvière

12 July 2025	Gent (Belgium)	1–1	(Belgium) La Louvière

19 July 2025	La Louvière (Belgium)	1–2	(Belgium) Lokeren

19 July 2025	La Louvière (Belgium)	1–0	(Belgium) Union Namur

== Competitions ==
=== Overall record ===
Competition	First match	Last match	Starting round	Final position	Record							
Competition	First match	Last match	Starting round	Final position	Pld	W	D	L	GF	GA	GD	Win %
Belgian Pro League regular season	26 July 2025	22 March 2026	Matchday 1	15th place	30	6	13	11	30	37	−7	20.00
Relegation play-offs	6 April 2026	9 May 2026	Matchday 1	Third place	6	1	0	5	7	11	−4	16.67
Belgian Cup	29 October 2025	13 January 2026	Seventh round	Quarter-finals	3	2	0	1	5	4	+1	66.67
Total					39	9	13	17	42	52	−10	23.08

Last updated: complete
Source: Competitions

=== Belgian Pro League ===
==== League table ====
Pos	Team	Pld	W	D	L	GF	GA	GD	Pts	Qualification or relegation
12	OH Leuven	30	9	7	14	32	43	−11	34	Qualification for the Europe play-offs
13	Zulte Waregem	30	8	8	14	38	47	−9	32	Qualification for the Relegation play-offs
14	Cercle Brugge	30	7	10	13	39	47	−8	31	Qualification for the Relegation play-offs
15	La Louvière	30	6	13	11	30	37	−7	31	Qualification for the Relegation play-offs
16	Dender EH	30	3	10	17	24	51	−27	19	Qualification for the Relegation play-offs

Source: Jupiler Pro League (in Dutch)
Rules for classification: 1) Points; 2) Matches won; 3) Goal difference; 4) Goals scored; 5) Away matches won; 6) Away goal difference; 7) Away goals scored; 8) Play-off.

Pos	Team	Pld	W	D	L	GF	GA	GD	Pts	Qualification or relegation	CLU	USG	STR	AND	GNT	MEC
1	Club Brugge (C)	10	8	1	1	32	9	+23	57	Qualification for the Champions League league phase	—	5–0	2–0	4–2	5–0	6–1
2	Union SG	10	6	2	2	16	10	+6	53	Qualification for the Champions League third qualifying round	2–1	—	1–0	5–1	0–0	3–0
3	Sint-Truiden	10	4	2	4	14	11	+3	43	Qualification for the Europa League play-off round (Note: Union SG won the 2025–26 Belgian Cup and qualified for the Champions League through finishing in the top two, the Europa League play-off round berth was therefore transferred to Sint-Truiden.)	1–2	2–1	—	2–0	1–1	3–0
4	Anderlecht	10	3	2	5	16	23	−7	33	Qualification for the Europa League second qualifying round	1–3	1–3	3–1	—	3–1	2–2
5	Gent (O)	10	0	6	4	4	14	−10	29	Qualification for the European competition play-off	0–2	0–0	0–0	1–1	—	1–1
6	Mechelen	10	1	3	6	9	24	−15	29		2–2	0–1	1–4	1–2	1–0	—

Source: Jupiler Pro League (in Dutch), Soccerway
Legend: Blue = home team win; Yellow = draw; Red = away team win.
Rules for classification: 1) Points; 2) Points without (possible) half points added due to rounding; 3) Regular season finishing position.
(C) Champions; (O) Play-off winners
Notes:

Pos	Team	Pld	W	D	L	GF	GA	GD	Pts	Qualification or relegation	GNK	STA	CHA	WES	ANT	OHL
1	Genk	10	4	5	1	11	6	+5	38	Qualification for the European competition play-off	—	1–1	1–1	3–0	0–0	0–0
2	Standard Liège	10	5	2	3	17	11	+6	37		0–0	—	0–2	1–2	1–2	2–1
3	Charleroi	10	5	2	3	12	8	+4	34		2–0	1–2	—	0–1	2–1	1–1
4	Westerlo	10	4	1	5	14	17	−3	33		1–2	1–2	2–0	—	2–4	3–3
5	Antwerp	10	4	1	5	12	16	−4	31		1–2	0–5	0–1	2–0	—	2–0
6	OH Leuven	10	1	3	6	9	17	−8	23		0–2	1–3	0–2	0–2	3–0	—

Source: Jupiler Pro League (in Dutch), Soccerway
Legend: Blue = home team win; Yellow = draw; Red = away team win.
Rules for classification: 1) Points; 2) Points without (possible) half points added due to rounding; 3) Regular season finishing position.

Pos	Team	Pld	W	D	L	GF	GA	GD	Pts	Qualification or relegation	ZWA	CER	LAL	DEN
1	Zulte Waregem	6	5	1	0	15	6	+9	48		—	2–2	4–0	2–1
2	Cercle Brugge	6	3	1	2	14	11	+3	41		2–3	—	3–0	2–1
3	La Louvière	6	1	0	5	5	13	−8	34		0–2	4–1	—	0–1
4	Dender EH (R)	6	2	0	4	7	11	−4	25	Qualification for the promotion/relegation play-offs	1–2	1–4	2–1	—

Source: Jupiler Pro League (in Dutch), Soccerway
Legend: Blue = home team win; Yellow = draw; Red = away team win.
Rules for classification: 1) Points; 2) Regular season finishing position.
(R) Relegated

==== Results summary ====
Overall								Home						Away					
Pld	W	D	L	GF	GA	GD	Pts	W	D	L	GF	GA	GD	W	D	L	GF	GA	GD
8	3	1	4	7	9	−2	10	2	1	1	2	2	0	1	0	3	5	7	−2

Last updated: complete.

==== Results by round ====
Round	1	2	3	4	5	6	7	8
Ground	H	A	H	A	H	A	H	A
Result	L	L	W	L	D	L	W	W
Position	15	16	11	13				

A = Away; H = Home; W = Win; D = Draw; L = Loss

==== Matches ====
26 July 2025 1	La Louvière	0–2	Standard Liège	La Louvière
20:45			Henry 5'; Ilaimaharitra 39' (pen.)	Stadium: Easi Arena; Attendance: 8,050; Referee: Lawrence Visser

2 August 2025 2	Gent	1–0	La Louvière	Ghent
20:45	Ito 87'		Lahssaini (yellow card) 88'	Stadium: Planet Group Arena; Attendance: 10,412; Referee: Nathan Verboomen

10 August 2025 3	La Louvière	1–0	Charleroi	La Louvière
13:30	Camara 16' (o.g.)			Stadium: Easi Arena; Attendance: 8,001; Referee: Nicolas Laforge

17 August 2025 4	Sint-Truiden	2–1	La Louvière	Sint-Truiden
16:00	Vanwesemael 20'; Goto 90+1'		Mendy 70'	Stadium: Stayen; Attendance: 6,047; Referee: Bert Verbeke

25 August 2025 5	La Louvière	0–0	Union Saint-Gilloise	La Louvière
18:30	Liongola (yellow card) 8'; Maës (yellow card) 29'		Rodríguez (yellow card) 33'; Niang (yellow card) 71'; Vanhoutte (yellow card) 82'	Stadium: Easi Arena; Attendance: 8,050; Referee: Nathan Verboomen

30 August 2025 6	Mechelen	3–2	La Louvière	Mechelen
16:00	Schoofs 25'; Lauberbach 90', 90+5'		De Wolf 69' (o.g.); Halhal 86' (o.g.)	Stadium: Achter de Kazerne; Attendance: 11,069; Referee: Massimiliano Ledda

13 September 2025 7	La Louvière	1–0	Club Brugge	La Louvière
20:45	Faye 24'		Spileers (yellow card) 29'; Tzolis (penalty missed) 90+7'	Stadium: Easi Arena; Attendance: 6,478; Referee: Bert Put

20 September 2025 8	OH Leuven	1–2	La Louvière	Leuven
16:00 UTC+2	Kaba 8'; Gil (yellow card) 47'; Dussenne (yellow card) 65'; Maertens (yellow card) 90+4'; Terho (yellow card) 90+6'		Afriyie 16', 27', (yellow card) 89'; Liongola (yellow card) 78'; Maisonneuve (yellow card) 90+6'	Stadium: Den Dreef

=== Belgian Cup ===
29 October 2025 Seventh round	Heist	1–2	La Louvière	Heist-op-den-Berg
20:30 CET	Goossens 57'	Report	Pau 37' (pen.); Gillot 88'	Stadium: Gemeentelijk Sportcentrum

2 December 2025 Round of 16	Beerschot	1–2	La Louvière	Antwerp
20:30 CET	Vula 90+6'	Report	Fall 27', 37'	Stadium: Olympisch Stadion

13 January 2026 Quarter-finals	Antwerp	2–1 (a.e.t.)	La Louvière	Antwerp
20:30 CET	Kerk 13', 116'	Report	Fall 45+1'	Stadium: Bosuilstadion
