= Heskey =

Heskey is a surname. Notable people with the surname include:

- Emile Heskey (born 1978), English former footballer
- Jaden Heskey (born 2005), English footballer, son of Emile Heskey
- Reigan Heskey (born 2008), English footballer, son of Emile Heskey
