= Sean Fusire =

Zimbabwean footballer (born 2005)

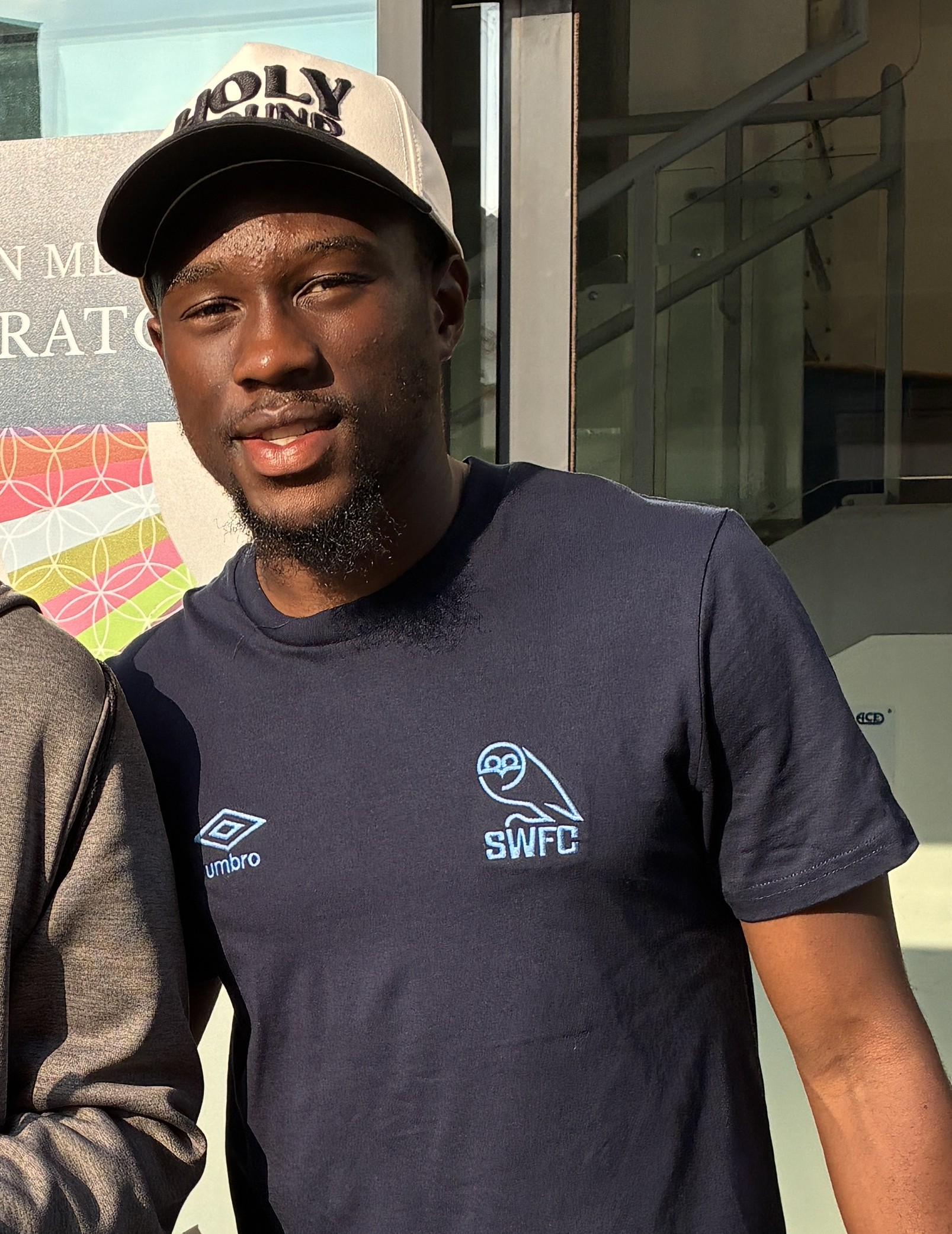
- Fusire in 2026

Personal information
- Full name: Sean Sheunesu Fusire
- Date of birth: 31 May 2005 (age 21)
- Place of birth: Sheffield, England
- Height: 5 ft 11 in (1.81 m)
- Positions: Right-back; centre midfielder

Team information
- Current team: Sheffield Wednesday
- Number: 14

Youth career
- 2014–2023: Sheffield Wednesday

Senior career*
Years	Team	Apps	(Gls)
2023–	Sheffield Wednesday	36	(1)
2025	→ Carlisle United (loan)	14	(0)

International career^{‡}
2025–	Zimbabwe	8	(0)
- * Club domestic league appearances and goals as of 20:57, 11 November 2026 (UTC) ‡ National team caps and goals as of 19:04, 28 September 2026 (UTC)

Sean Sheunesu Fusire (born 31 May 2005) is a professional footballer who plays as a right-back for EFL League One club Sheffield Wednesday. Born in England, he plays for the Zimbabwe national team.

== Club career ==
=== Sheffield Wednesday ===
==== Youth career ====
Fusire joined Sheffield Wednesday at the age of 9 and was a regular for the club's U18 and U21 side. He plays centrally or outside in midfield as well as playing right wing back. He signed his first pro contract on 9 December 2022. He made his senior debut against Fleetwood Town in an FA Cup replay on 7 February 2023. Following injuries in the squad, he joined the first team for the remainder of the season along with fellow youngsters Rio Shipston and Adam Alimi-Adetoro who have all made their debut during the season. In November 2023, Fusire underwent a hernia operation, keeping him on the sidelines for a lengthy spell.

==== 2024–2025: Loan to Carlisle United ====
On 3 January 2025, Fusire signed a new contract at the club until the summer of 2028. A few days later Fusire joined Carlisle United on a loan until the end of the season. He made his debut coming off the bench in a 1–0 defeat at home to Bradford City. He finished his spell having made 14 appearances.

==== 2025–2026 ====
He returned to Sheffield Wednesday following his loan spell at Carlisle United, making his league debut on the opening day of the season, coming off the bench in a 2–1 defeat against Leicester City, replacing the injured Nathaniel Chalobah. He made his first Championship start a week later in the home game against Stoke City, where he played 65 minutes before being replaced by Charlie McNeill, which would see Wednesday eventually lose 3–0. In October 2025, he scored his first senior goal in the 1–2 defeat against Oxford United, driving in a loose ball.

== International career ==
Fusire declared himself for the Zimbabwe national team in May 2025. The same month he received his first international call up. He made his debut against Burkina Faso on 6 June 2025. He was called up for the Zimbabwe squad for the 2025 Africa Cup of Nations held in Morocco.

== Personal life ==
Born in England, Fusire is of Zimbabwean descent.

== Career statistics ==
As of 11 November 2026

Appearances and goals by club, season and competition
Club	Season	League			FA Cup		League Cup		Other		Total	
Club	Season	Division	Apps	Goals	Apps	Goals	Apps	Goals	Apps	Goals	Apps	Goals
Sheffield Wednesday	2022–23	League One	0	0	1	0	0	0	–		1	0
Sheffield Wednesday	2023–24	Championship	0	0	0	0	1	0	–		1	0
Sheffield Wednesday	2024–25	Championship	0	0	0	0	4	0	–		4	0
Sheffield Wednesday	2025–26	Championship	35	1	1	0	3	0	–		39	1
Sheffield Wednesday	2026–27	League One	1	0	1	0	1	0	2 (Note: Appearance(s) in EFL Trophy)	0	5	0
Sheffield Wednesday	Total		36	1	3	0	9	0	2	0	50	1
Carlisle United (loan)	2024–25	League Two	14	0	–		–		–		14	0
Career total			50	1	3	0	9	0	2	0	64	1

=== International ===
As of 28 September 2026

National team	Year	Apps	Goals
Zimbabwe	2025	4	0
Zimbabwe	2026	4	0
Total		8	0

== Honours ==
Zimbabwe

- Unity Cup third place: 2026
