= Kieran Morrison (footballer) =

Northern Irish footballer (born 2006)

Personal information
- Full name: Kieran Yusuf Morrison
- Date of birth: 9 November 2006 (age 20)
- Place of birth: Manchester, England
- Height: 1.73 m (5 ft 8 in)
- Position: Right winger

Team information
- Current team: Sheffield Wednesday (on loan from Liverpool)
- Number: 20

Youth career
- –2019: Manchester United
- 2019–2026: Liverpool

Senior career*
| Years | Team | Apps | (Gls) |
| 2025– | Liverpool | 0 | (0) |
| 2026– | → Sheffield Wednesday (loan) | 12 | (0) |

International career^{‡}
| 2022–2023 | Northern Ireland U17 | 4 | (1) |
| 2023– | Northern Ireland U19 | 8 | (0) |
| 2025– | Northern Ireland U21 | 3 | (0) |
| 2026– | Northern Ireland | 4 | (0) |
- * Club domestic league appearances and goals as of 19:58, 8 November 2026 (UTC) ‡ National team caps and goals as of 00:15, 18 November 2026 (UTC)

Kieran Yusuf Morrison (born 9 November 2006) is a professional footballer who plays as a winger for EFL League One club Sheffield Wednesday on loan from Premier League club Liverpool. Born in England, he plays for the Northern Ireland national team.

== Club career ==
Morrison joined Liverpool's academy at under-14 level, having previously been in Manchester United's youth setup.

Morrison made his debut for the Liverpool U18 side in September 2022, and his debut for the Liverpool U21 side in January 2023. In July 2023, he agreed scholarship contract with the club. He signed a three-year professional contract with Liverpool in February 2024. On 10 February 2024, Morrison achieved an unusual feat when he scored two goals in a single minute for Liverpool U18 against Blackburn Rovers U18.

He was included in the Liverpool first-team squad for the UEFA Champions League tie against PSV Eindhoven on 29 January 2025 and was named amongst the match-day substitutes.

On 29 October 2025, he made his senior debut for the club in an 3–0 EFL Cup defeat against Crystal Palace. Having scored 10 goals in a run of six Premier League 2 matches in 2026, he also made a substitute appearance that season away against Wolves in a 3–1 away win in the FA Cup on 6 March 2026. Morrison was shortlisted for the Premier League Two player of the year, having contributed 15 goals and seven assists for Liverpool’s under-21 side in the 2025-26 season. He signed a new four-year contract with the club in May 2026.

On 20 August 2026, Morrison signed a season-long loan at League One club Sheffield Wednesday for the 2026–27 season. He made his debut the same day, coming off the bench in the 0–1 defeat to Bradford City.

== International career ==
Born in Manchester, Morrison is of Northern Irish descent through a grandmother. He is a Northern Ireland youth international. In 2019, he played in the Victory Shield. He made his Northern Ireland U17 debut in 2022 against the Faroe Islands U17, before scoring his first goal for them in a UEFA U17 European Championship qualifier in March 2023 against Denmark U17. In November 2023, he was called up to the Northern Ireland national under-19 football team.

Morrison made his debut for the Northern Ireland U21 team on 9 October 2025, as a late substitute in a 2–0 win over Malta U21s.

In March 2026, he was called up to the Northern Irish senior squad for the first time, ahead of their 2026 FIFA World Cup qualifying play-off against Italy. He made his senior debut on 4 June 2026, playing the first half of a 1–0 friendly win over Guinea at the Estadio Municipal de La Línea de la Concepción in Spain. He made his first senior start for Northern Ireland on 2 October 2026 in a 3–0 away win against Ukraine in the UEFA Nations League.

== Style of play ==
Morrison has been described as a winger, but can play centrally as well as wide. His style of play has been compared to that of Mohamed Salah.

== Career statistics ==
=== Club ===
As of 8 November 2026

Appearances and goals by club, season and competition
| Club | Season | League | | | FA Cup | | EFL Cup | | Europe | | Other | | Total | |
| Club | Season | Division | Apps | Goals | Apps | Goals | Apps | Goals | Apps | Goals | Apps | Goals | Apps | Goals |
|---|---|---|---|---|---|---|---|---|---|---|---|---|---|---|
| Liverpool U23 | 2023–24 | — | | | — | | — | | — | | 2 (Note: Appearance(s) in EFL Trophy) | 0 | 2 | 0 |
| Liverpool U23 | 2024–25 | — | | | — | | — | | — | | 1 | 0 | 1 | 0 |
| Liverpool U23 | 2025–26 | — | | | — | | — | | — | | 1 | 0 | 1 | 0 |
| Total | | | | | — | | — | | — | | 4 | 0 | 4 | 0 |
| Liverpool | 2025–26 | Premier League | 0 | 0 | 1 | 0 | 1 | 0 | 0 | 0 | 0 | 0 | 2 | 0 |
| Liverpool | 2026–27 | Premier League | 0 | 0 | 0 | 0 | 0 | 0 | 0 | 0 | 0 | 0 | 0 | 0 |
| Liverpool | Total | | 0 | 0 | 1 | 0 | 1 | 0 | 0 | 0 | 0 | 0 | 2 | 0 |
| Sheffield Wednesday (loan) | 2026–27 | League One | 12 | 0 | 1 | 0 | 1 | 0 | — | | 0 | 0 | 14 | 0 |
| Career total | | | 12 | 0 | 2 | 0 | 2 | 0 | 0 | 0 | 4 | 0 | 20 | 0 |

=== International ===
As of 17 November 2026

Appearances and goals by national team and year
| National team | Year | Apps | Goals |
|---|---|---|---|
| Northern Ireland | 2026 | 4 | 0 |
| Total | | 4 | 0 |
