= 2026–27 Sheffield Wednesday F.C. season =

English football club season

Sheffield Wednesday
2026–27 season
- Owner: Arise Capital Partners LLC
- Chairman: David Storch
- Manager: Henrik Pedersen (until 25 October); Matt Hamshaw (caretaker); Dave Challinor (from 3 November)
- Stadium: Hillsborough Stadium
- League One: 5th
- FA Cup: First round (vs Oldham Athletic)
- EFL Cup: Second round (vs Wolverhampton Wanderers)
- EFL Trophy: Round of 32
- Top goalscorer: League: Jamal Lowe (7); All: Jamal Lowe (9)
- Highest home attendance: 33,188 vs Bradford City, 20 August 2026, League One
- Lowest home attendance: 5,423 vs Sunderland U21, 6 October 2026, EFL Trophy
- Average home league attendance: 30,911
- Biggest win: 7–2 vs Bromley (H), 29 August 2026, League One; 5–0 vs AFC Wimbledon (H), 17 October 2026, League One
- Biggest defeat: 0–4 vs Accrington Stanley (H), 11 November 2026, EFL Trophy
Home colours	Away colours	Third colours

The 2026–27 season is the 159th season in the existence of Sheffield Wednesday and the club's first season back in League One following relegation the previous season. In addition to the league, they also competed in the FA Cup, EFL Cup and the EFL Trophy.

== Season overview ==
=== June ===
On 11 June, the club announced they have broken the club’s record for the highest number of Season Tickets sold ahead of a single campaign.

On 15 June, Simon Wilson was announced as the clubs new sporting director, joining from Stockport County.

On 24 June, the club struck a partnership with General Sports Worldwide, with their role to include remodelling and revenue generation for all key commercial areas, primarily partnerships, premium seating and retail.

On 30 June, the club announced a new multi-year partnership with Umbro to be their new technical partner.

=== July ===
On 8 July, Fibrely was announced as the club’s new front-of-shirt partner and Wolf Competitions as their online competitions and sleeve partner.

On 9 July, the club unveiled their 2026–27 home shirt.

On 23 July, CEO David Bruce joined the Board of Directors of Wednesday 1867 Limited.

On 29 July, the club unveiled their 2026–27 away shirt.

=== August ===
On 7 August, MrQ became the club’s official back-of-shirt sponsor.

On 7 August, Wednesday confirmed their season squad numbers.

On 11 August, NOCO became the new back-of-shorts sponsor for the season.

=== September ===
On 4 September, the club unveiled their 2026–27 third shirt.

== Current squad ==
As of 20 November 2026

No.	Name	Position	Nationality	Place of birth	Date of birth (age)	Signed from	Date signed	Fee	Contract end
Goalkeepers
1	Joe Lumley	GK	(England)	Harlow	15 February 1995 (age 31)	Bristol City	11 July 2026	Free Transfer	30 June 2028
13	Ashley Maynard-Brewer	GK	(Australia)	Dunstable	25 June 1999 (age 27)	Dundee United	31 July 2026	Free Transfer	30 June 2027
27	Connal Trueman	GK	(England)	Birmingham	26 March 1996 (age 30)	Milton Keynes Dons	30 July 2026	Free Transfer	30 June 2027
35	Jack Phillips	GK	(England)		15 October 2005 (age 21)	Academy	3 July 2024	—N/a	30 June 2027
49	Oliver Bramhall	GK	(England)			Academy	—N/a	—N/a	—N/a
Defenders
2	Liam Palmer	RB/LB/CB	(Scotland)	Worksop	19 September 1991 (age 35)	Academy	1 July 2010	—N/a	30 June 2027
3	Max Lowe	LB/CB	(England)	South Normanton	11 May 1997 (age 29)	Sheffield United	1 July 2024	Free Transfer	30 June 2027
4	Ricardo Santos	CB	(Cape Verde)	Almada	18 June 1995 (age 31)	Swansea City	19 June 2026	Undisclosed	30 June 2027
5	Di'Shon Bernard	CB	(Jamaica)	Wandsworth	14 October 2000 (age 26)	Manchester United	31 July 2023	Free Transfer	30 June 2027
6	Liam Cooper	CB	(Scotland)	Kingston upon Hull	30 August 1991 (age 35)	CSKA Sofia	17 November 2025	Free Transfer	30 June 2027
7	Yan Valery	RB	(Tunisia)	Champigny-sur-Marne	22 February 1999 (age 27)	Angers	21 June 2024	Undisclosed	30 June 2027
22	Gabriel Otegbayo	CB	(Republic of Ireland)	Cork	11 February 2005 (age 21)	Burnley	1 March 2024	Free Transfer	30 June 2027
26	Sil Swinkels	CB	(Netherlands)	Sint-Oedenrode	6 January 2004 (age 22)	Aston Villa	2 July 2026	Undisclosed	30 June 2029
30	Ernie Weaver	CB	(England)	Sheffield	8 September 2006 (age 20)	Academy	2 July 2025	—N/a	30 June 2027
31	Louis Poland	LB	(England)			Everton	8 September 2026	Free Transfer	
33	Reece James	LB	(England)	Bacup	7 November 1993 (age 33)	Rotherham United	24 August 2026	Free Transfer	30 June 2027
39	Harrison Langford	CB	(England)			Academy	—N/a	—N/a	—N/a
42	Will McPartland	RB	(England)		20 January 2008 (age 18)	Middlesbrough	8 September 2026	Free Transfer	
Midfielders
8	Callum Slattery	CM	(England)	Kidlington	8 February 1999 (age 27)	Motherwell	1 July 2026	Free Transfer	30 June 2029
10	Barry Bannan	CM	(Scotland)	Airdrie	1 December 1989 (age 36)	Millwall	9 July 2026	Undisclosed	30 June 2027
14	Sean Fusire	RB/CM	(Zimbabwe)	Sheffield	31 May 2005 (age 21)	Academy	9 December 2022	—N/a	30 June 2027
16	Billy Mitchell	DM	(England)	Orpington	7 April 2001 (age 25)	Millwall	19 July 2026	Free Transfer	30 June 2029
18	Jaden Heskey	CM	(England)	Manchester	17 December 2005 (age 20)	Manchester City	1 September 2026	Loan	31 May 2027
21	Tyler Onyango	CM	(England)	Luton	4 March 2003 (age 23)	Everton	7 August 2026	Free Transfer	30 June 2029
23	Jordi Liongola	RB/RM	(Burundi)	Tessenderlo	17 May 2000 (age 26)	La Louvière	27 June 2026	Undisclosed	30 June 2029
36	James Kay	CM	(England)		6 November 2008 (age 18)	Academy	—N/a	—N/a	—N/a
37	Jarvis Thornton	CM	(England)	Barnsley	10 January 2006 (age 20)	Academy	3 July 2024	—N/a	30 June 2028
Forwards
9	Jamal Lowe	RW/LW/CF	(Jamaica)	Harrow	21 July 1994 (age 32)	Bournemouth	1 July 2024	Free Transfer	30 June 2027
11	Louie Barry	LW	(England)	Sutton Coldfield	21 June 2003 (age 23)	Aston Villa	9 July 2026	Undisclosed	30 June 2030
12	Ali Al-Hamadi	CF	(Iraq)	Maysan	1 March 2002 (age 24)	Ipswich Town	26 August 2026	Loan	31 May 2027
19	Will Grainger	RW/CF	(Wales)		20 November 2008 (age 18)	Academy	30 June 2026	—N/a	30 June 2029
20	Kieran Morrison	RW/LW	(Northern Ireland)	Manchester	9 November 2006 (age 20)	Liverpool	20 August 2026	Loan	31 May 2027
24	Harry Gray	LW/CF	(England)	London	8 October 2008 (age 18)	Leeds United	7 July 2026	Loan	31 May 2027
29	George Brown	CF	(England)		28 May 2006 (age 20)	Leeds UFCA	6 September 2024	Free Transfer	30 June 2027
41	Kleven De Oliveira	LW	(England)			Academy	—N/a	—N/a	—N/a
43	Charlie Liddell	CF	(England)			Academy	—N/a	—N/a	—N/a
48	Mason Burstow	CF	(England)	Greenwich	4 August 2003 (age 23)	Hull City	31 July 2026	Loan	31 May 2027
50	Davis Keillor-Dunn	CF	(England)	Sunderland	2 November 1997 (age 29)	Wrexham	3 September 2026	Loan	2 January 2027
Out on loan
17	Charlie McNeill	CF	(England)	Droylsden	9 September 2003 (age 23)	Manchester United	10 July 2024	Free Transfer	30 June 2027
28	Cole McGhee	CB	(England)	Coventry	28 January 2006 (age 20)	Preston North End	2 July 2025	Free Transfer	30 June 2027
32	Joe Emery	CB	(England)		18 April 2007 (age 19)	Academy	2 July 2025	—N/a	30 June 2027
34	Fortune Onoh	CM	(England)			Grimsby Town	8 September 2026	Free Transfer	
38	Denny Oliver	CM	(England)		2 January 2007 (age 19)	Lincoln City	2 July 2025	Free Transfer	30 June 2027
40	Devlan Moses	CF	(Northern Ireland)	Huddersfield	26 September 2005 (age 21)	Academy	3 July 2024	—N/a	30 June 2027
44	Joel Akpobi	LW	(England)		6 June 2008 (age 18)	Academy	23 September 2026	—N/a	
46	Kailen Hatfield	CB	(England)		10 September 2007 (age 19)	Academy	8 September 2026	—N/a	
47	Samuel Duruh	CF	(Nigeria)		8 September 2007 (age 19)	Kilmarnock	8 September 2026	Free Transfer	
	Iké Ugbo	CF	(Canada)	Lewisham	21 September 1998 (age 28)	Troyes	8 August 2024	Undisclosed	30 June 2028

=== International Call-Ups ===
No	Name	Team	Competition	Opposition	Date	Ref
31	(Wales) Will Grainger	Wales U19	Friendly	Qatar U19, Sweden U19	5 & 8 June 2026	
25	(Wales) Logan Stretch	Wales U19	Friendly	Qatar U19, Sweden U19	5 & 8 June 2026	
25	(Wales) Logan Stretch	Wales U19	2026 UEFA European Under-19 Championship	Spain U19, Germany U19, Denmark U19	28 June, 1 & 4 July 2026	
12	(Iraq) Ali Al-Hamadi (Note: Ali Al-Hamadi withdrew on 23 September 2026)	Iraq	27th Arabian Gulf Cup	Oman, Kuwait, Saudi Arabia	23, 26 & 29 September 2026	
14	(Zimbabwe) Sean Fusire	Zimbabwe	2027 Africa Cup of Nations qualification	Sierra Leone, (Democratic Republic of the Congo) Democratic Republic of Congo	24 & 28 September 2026	
7	(Tunisia) Yan Valery	Tunisia	2027 Africa Cup of Nations qualification	Uganda, Botswana	24, 28 September 2026	
20	(Northern Ireland) Kieran Morrison	Northern Ireland	2026–27 UEFA Nations League	(Georgia (country)) Georgia, Hungary, Ukraine, (Georgia (country)) Georgia	25 & 28 September, 2 & 5 October 2026	
24	(England) Harry Gray	England U19	Friendly	Republic of Ireland U19, Norway U19, (United States) USA U19, Belgium U19	25, 29 September, 2 & 5 October 2026	
19	(Wales) Will Grainger	Wales U19	Friendly	(United States) USA U19, Norway U19, Northern Ireland U19	29 September, 2 & 5 October 2026	
19	(Wales) Will Grainger	Wales U19	2027 UEFA European Under-19 Championship qualification	Finland U19, Spain U19, Iceland U19	11, 14 & 17 November 2026	
14	(Zimbabwe) Sean Fusire	Zimbabwe	2027 Africa Cup of Nations qualification	Equatorial Guinea, Equatorial Guinea	13 & 16 November 2026	
23	(Burundi) Jordi Liongola	Burundi	2027 Africa Cup of Nations qualification	Zambia, Zambia	13 & 17 November 2026	
20	(Northern Ireland) Kieran Morrison	Northern Ireland	2026–27 UEFA Nations League	Ukraine, Hungary	14 & 17 November 2026	

== Coaching staff ==
Before the first game in the league, coach Craig Mudd returned to Manchester City to become their new Head of Player Development, with Wednesday bringing in former player Matt Hamshaw as his replacement. In October, set-piece analyst Ben King joined Bristol City as their set-piece coach. On 25 October, Henrik Pedersen was relieved of his duties with first team coach Matt Hamshaw taking interim charge.

On 1 November, prior to the match against Blackpool, it was confirmed that Dave Challinor had agreed to become the new manager the night before and he would formally be introduced the following day. On 3 November, Challinor was confirmed to have signed a contract until 2030, with Clint Hill and Antony Sweeney appointed as assistant coaches to work with the existing coaching team. On 5 November, coach Pete Shuttleworth left the club, with Matt Hamshaw and Daryl Flahavan continue with the first team, whilst Andy Holdsworth continue to focus on individual player development for those aged 18 and above, while Giles Coke returns to his role with the Under-21s.

In the academy, Under-18s head coach Jordan Broadbent left the club in June to become first team manager of National League North club Buxton. In September Mark Burton was appointed the U21 manager.

=== Henrik Pedersen (until 25 October 2026) ===
Role	Name
Manager	(Denmark) Henrik Pedersen
Coach	(England) Giles Coke
Coach	(England) Matt Hamshaw
Coach	(England) Andy Holdsworth
Coach	(England) Pete Shuttleworth
Goalkeeper coach	(England) Darryl Flahavan

=== Dave Challinor (from 3 November 2026) ===
Role	Name
Manager	(England) Dave Challinor
Assistant coach	(England) Matt Hamshaw
Assistant coach	(England) Clint Hill
Assistant coach	(England) Antony Sweeney
Goalkeeper coach	(England) Darryl Flahavan

== Pre-season and friendlies ==
In May, non-league sides Hallam and Goole confirmed pre-season friendlies against a Wednesday XI for the upcoming season. On 8 June, Wednesday confirmed their full pre-season schedule, confirming they would return for testing at the end of June, before heading off for 6 days at St George’s Park, culminating in a friendly against West Bromwich Albion. They would then return to Sheffield which would see them face Preston North End in a behind-closed-doors friendley at Middlewood Road, before heading overseas for two stops; the first, a 5 day stay in Budapest, Hungary, then concluding the week in Vienna, Austria. They would then finish their pre-season fixtures with two friendlies in one day against Accrington Stanley and Oldham Athletic on 1 August. On 19 June, the friendly against Hallam was confirmed by Wednesday, whilst Buxton confirmed a Wednesday XI would play them in July. On 24 June, the players returned for pre-season testing. On 13 July, Wednesday confirmed the behind-closed-doors friendly against Preston North End, would now take place across the Pennines. On 20 July, a behind-closed-doors friendly against Stoke City in Austria was confirmed. A Wednesday XI were due to play a friendly against Buxton, but was cancelled the day before.

11 July 2026 Friendly	West Bromwich Albion	3–0	Sheffield Wednesday	Burton upon Trent
12:00 BST	Bielik; Morgan (pen.); Mowatt	Report		Stadium: St George’s Park; Attendance: 0 (Behind-closed-doors)

14 July 2026 Friendly	Hallam	0–0	Sheffield Wednesday XI	Crosspool, Sheffield
19:30 BST	Dando (yellow card) 70'	Report		Stadium: Sandygate

17 July 2026 Friendly	Goole	2–0	Sheffield Wednesday XI	Goole
19:30 BST	Ross 3'; Racher 10'			Stadium: Victoria Pleasure Grounds; Attendance: 771

18 July 2026 Friendly	Preston North End	2–3	Sheffield Wednesday	Chorley
13:00 BST	Devine; Lang	Report	Barry; J. Lowe; Johnson	Stadium: Preston North End First Team Training Ground; Attendance: 0 (Behind-closed-doors)
Note: match consisted of 2x 60 minute halves

25 July 2026 Friendly	Stoke City	2–0	Sheffield Wednesday	Vienna
14:00 CEST	Gallagher 10'; Cissé 47'	Report		Stadium: ÖFB Campus; Attendance: 0 (Behind-closed-doors)
Note: match one of two matches consisting of two 35 minute periods

25 July 2026 Friendly	Stoke City	4–0	Sheffield Wednesday	Vienna
15:50 CEST	Weaver 9' (o.g.); Smit 43', 47'; Rigo 51'	Report	Weaver (yellow card)	Stadium: ÖFB Campus; Attendance: 0 (Behind-closed-doors)
Note: match two of two matches consisting of two 35 minute periods

1 August 2026 Friendly	Accrington Stanley	0–0	Sheffield Wednesday	Accrington
12:30 BST		Report		Stadium: Wham Stadium; Attendance: 2,003

1 August 2026 Friendly	Oldham Athletic	4–0	Sheffield Wednesday	Oldham
16:00 BST	Kavanagh; Appiah-Forson; Trialist; Chilvers	Report		Stadium: Boundary Park; Attendance: 3,276; Referee: Abid Hussain

== Competitions ==
=== EFL League One ===
==== League table ====
Pos	Team	Pld	W	D	L	GF	GA	GD	Pts	Promotion, qualification or relegation
3	Oxford United	14	8	5	1	26	14	+12	29	Qualification for League One play-offs
4	Luton Town	15	8	3	4	29	22	+7	27	Qualification for League One play-offs
5	Sheffield Wednesday	15	7	5	3	27	15	+12	26	Qualification for League One play-offs
6	Bradford City	14	6	5	3	12	10	+2	23	Qualification for League One play-offs
7	Plymouth Argyle	16	7	2	7	21	24	−3	23	

Updated to match(es) played on 21 November 2026. Source: EFL Official Website
Rules for classification: 1) Points; 2) Goal difference; 3) Number of goals scored; 4) Head-to-head results; 5) Wins; 6) Away goals; 7) Penalty points (sec 9.5); 8) 12-point sending off offences

==== Results summary ====
Overall								Home						Away					
Pld	W	D	L	GF	GA	GD	Pts	W	D	L	GF	GA	GD	W	D	L	GF	GA	GD
15	7	5	3	27	15	+12	26	3	4	1	17	5	+12	4	1	2	10	10	0

Last updated: 20 November 2026.
Source: Soccerway

==== Results by round ====
Round	1	2	3	4	5	6	7	10	11	12	13	9^{1}	14	15	16	8^{2}
Ground	A	H	H	A	A	H	H	A	H	A	A	H	H	H	A	A
Result	W	L	W	W	W	D	D	D	W	L	L	D	D	W	W	
Position	6	12	4	2	1	1	2	7	6	7	8	9	9	5	5	
Points	3	3	6	9	12	13	14	15	18	18	18	19	20	23	26	

Updated to match(es) played on 21 November 2026. Source:
A = Away; H = Home; W = Win; D = Draw; L = Loss; P = Postponed
Notes:
- ^{1} Matchday 9 (vs Cambridge United) was postponed due to the international call-ups.
- ^{2} Matchday 8 (vs Stevenage) was postponed due to the international call-ups.

==== Matches ====
On 25 June, the EFL League One fixtures were released.

15 August 2026 1	Leyton Orient	1–2	Sheffield Wednesday	Leyton
15:00 BST	Olowu 25'; Hayden (yellow card) 57'; Obiero (yellow card) 63'	Report	Slattery 19'; Swinkels (yellow card) 31'; Otegbayo (yellow card) 41'; J. Lowe 66' (pen.)	Stadium: BetWright Stadium; Attendance: 7,896; Referee: Sam Allison

20 August 2026 2	Sheffield Wednesday	0–1	Bradford City	Sheffield
20:00 BST	Mitchell (yellow card) 61'	Report	Baldwin 47'; Pennington (yellow card) 77'	Stadium: Hillsborough Stadium; Attendance: 33,188; Referee: Thomas Parsons
Note: Live on Sky Sports

29 August 2026 3	Sheffield Wednesday	7–2	Bromley	Sheffield
15:00 BST	Slattery 7', (yellow card) 90+3'; Burstow 31'; J. Lowe 45', 73'; Barry 46', 49'; Otegbayo 81'	Report	Pinnock (yellow card) 34'; Sowunmi (yellow card) 56'; Adeboyejo 85' (pen.); Otegbayo 87' (o.g.)	Stadium: Hillsborough Stadium; Attendance: 30,006; Referee: Will Finnie

1 September 2026 4	Wycombe Wanderers	1–2	Sheffield Wednesday	High Wycombe
19:45 BST	Woodrow 6'; Henderson (yellow card) 79'	Report	Barry 11'; Slattery (yellow card) 44'; J. Lowe 45+8' (pen.); Bannan (yellow card) 84'	Stadium: Adams Park; Attendance: 6,095; Referee: David Rock
Note: Live on Sky Sports

5 September 2026 5	Peterborough United	1–2	Sheffield Wednesday	Peterborough
12:30 BST	Williams (yellow card) 43'; Woods 47'; Khela (yellow card) 78'	Report	Feendey 38' (o.g.); Heskey (yellow card) 57'; Slattery (yellow card) 62'; Valery 79'; Morrison (yellow card) 90+6'	Stadium: Weston Homes Stadium; Attendance: 10,848; Referee: Andrew Humphries
Note: Live on Sky Sports

12 September 2026 6	Sheffield Wednesday	0–0	Wigan Athletic	Sheffield
15:00 BST	Cooper (yellow card) 53'; Gray (yellow card) 90'	Report	Walsh (yellow card) 50'; Barrett (yellow card) 90+2'; Costelloe (yellow card) 90+3'	Stadium: Hillsborough Stadium; Attendance: 30,725; Referee: Seb Stockbridge

19 September 2026 7	Sheffield Wednesday	0–0	Stockport County	Sheffield
15:00 BST	James (yellow card) 27'; Cooper (yellow card) 68'; Valery (yellow card) 90+3'	Report	O'Connell (yellow card) 58'	Stadium: Hillsborough Stadium; Attendance: 32,290; Referee: Ben Toner

10 October 2026 10	Huddersfield Town	2–2	Sheffield Wednesday	Huddersfield
15:00 BST	Collins (yellow card) 26'; Taylor 46'; Fernandes 68'; Low (yellow card) 90+12'	Report	Slattery (yellow card) 22'; Lumley (yellow card) 57'; Bowat 88' (o.g.); J. Lowe 90+8' (pen.); Palmer (yellow card) 90+12'	Stadium: Accu Stadium; Attendance: 19,794; Referee: Edward Duckworth

17 October 2026 11	Sheffield Wednesday	5–0	AFC Wimbledon	Sheffield
15:00 BST	Bannan 38'; Keillor-Dunn 39', 85'; Gray 45'; James (yellow card) 49'; Slattery 56'; Heskey (yellow card) 60'	Report	Yiadom (yellow card) 70'	Stadium: Hillsborough Stadium; Attendance: 30,477; Referee: Emily Heaslip

20 October 2026 12	Notts County	2–0	Sheffield Wednesday	Nottingham
19:45 BST	Smyth (yellow card) 34'; Kanu 38' (pen.); Grant (yellow card) 45+2'; Lipsiuc 81'	Report	Slattery (yellow card) 15'; J. Lowe (red card) 50'; Heskey (yellow card) 89'	Stadium: Meadow Lane; Attendance: 12,523; Referee: Stephen Parkinson
Note: Live on Sky Sports

24 October 2026 13	Doncaster Rovers	2–0	Sheffield Wednesday	Doncaster
15:00 BST	Bailey 7', 16'; Gotts (yellow card) 73'	Report	Al-Hamadi (yellow card) 14'; Mitchell (yellow card) 86'	Stadium: Club Doncaster Sports Village; Attendance: 11,257; Referee: Ross Martin

27 October 2026 9	Sheffield Wednesday	1–1	Cambridge United	Sheffield
19:45 GMT	Burstow 50'; James (yellow card) 65'	Report	Kaikai 67'; Lavery (yellow card) 90+5'	Stadium: Hillsborough Stadium; Attendance: 30,701; Referee: Dean Whitestone
Note: Match was originally scheduled for 3 October, but was postponed due to Sheffield Wednesday receiving the required number of international call-ups. Live on Sky Sports

1 November 2026 14	Sheffield Wednesday	1–1	Blackpool	Sheffield
14:00 GMT	Keillor-Dunn 25'; Burstow (yellow card) 38'; Swinkels (red card) 40'; Bannan (yellow card) 84'; Gray (yellow card) 90+4'	Report	Niskanen (yellow card) 79'; Yates 81'; Williams (yellow card) 82'; Bowler (yellow card) 84'	Stadium: Hillsborough Stadium; Attendance: 30,674; Referee: Simon Mather

14 November 2026 15	Sheffield Wednesday	3–0	Plymouth Argyle	Sheffield
15:00 GMT	Mitchell (yellow card) 41', (goal) 45'; Keillor-Dunn 79'; Bernard 82'; Cooper (yellow card) 90+1'	Report	Curtis (yellow card) 17'; White (yellow card) 72'; Harding (yellow card) 79'	Stadium: Hillsborough Stadium; Attendance: 29,228; Referee: Anthony Backhouse
Note: Live on Sky Sports

20 November 2026 16	Barnsley	1–2	Sheffield Wednesday	Barnsley
20:00 GMT	Yoganathan (yellow card) 29', (goal) 40'; Kay (yellow card) 35'	Report	J. Lowe 8', 14'; Mitchell (yellow card) 41'; Slattery (yellow card) 53'; Valery (yellow card) 69'	Stadium: Oakwell; Attendance: 16,428; Referee: Ollie Yates
Note: Live on Sky Sports

24 November 2026 8	Stevenage	v	Sheffield Wednesday	Stevenage
19:45 GMT				Stadium: SPORTA Arena
Note: match was originally schedulled for 26 September but was postponed due to Stevenage receiving the required number of international call-ups

28 November 2026 17	Sheffield Wednesday	v	Reading	Sheffield
15:00 GMT				Stadium: Hillsborough Stadium

1 December 2026 18	Oxford United	v	Sheffield Wednesday	Oxford
19:45 GMT				Stadium: Kassam Stadium
Note: Live on Sky Sports

10 December 2026 19	Leicester City	v	Sheffield Wednesday	Leicester
20:00 GMT				Stadium: King Power Stadium
Note: Live on Sky Sports

19 December 2026 20	Sheffield Wednesday	v	Luton Town	Sheffield
12:30 GMT				Stadium: Hillsborough Stadium
Note: Live on Sky Sports

26 December 2026 21	Burton Albion	v	Sheffield Wednesday	Burton upon Trent
15:00 GMT				Stadium: Pirelli Stadium
Note: Live on Sky Sports

29 December 2026 22	Sheffield Wednesday	v	Mansfield Town	Sheffield
19:45 GMT				Stadium: Hillsborough Stadium
Note: Live on Sky Sports

1 January 2027 23	Sheffield Wednesday	v	Huddersfield Town	Sheffield
15:00 GMT				Stadium: Hillsborough Stadium
Note: Live on Sky Sports

9 January 2027 24	Luton Town	v	Sheffield Wednesday	Luton
15:00 GMT				Stadium: Kenilworth Road

16 January 2027 25	AFC Wimbledon	v	Sheffield Wednesday	Wimbledon
15:00 GMT				Stadium: Cherry Red Records Stadium

19 January 2027 26	Sheffield Wednesday	v	Notts County	Sheffield
19:45 GMT				Stadium: Hillsborough Stadium
Note: Live on Sky Sports

23 January 2027 27	Sheffield Wednesday	v	Doncaster Rovers	Sheffield
12:30 GMT				Stadium: Hillsborough Stadium
Note: Live on Sky Sports

30 January 2027 28	Blackpool	v	Sheffield Wednesday	Blackpool
15:00 GMT				Stadium: Bloomfield Road

6 February 2027 29	Bromley	v	Sheffield Wednesday	Bromley
15:00 GMT				Stadium: Copperjax Community Stadium

9 February 2027 30	Sheffield Wednesday	v	Wycombe Wanderers	Sheffield
19:45 GMT				Stadium: Hillsborough Stadium
Note: Live on Sky Sports

13 February 2027 31	Sheffield Wednesday	v	Peterborough United	Sheffield
15:00 GMT				Stadium: Hillsborough Stadium

20 February 2027 32	Wigan Athletic	v	Sheffield Wednesday	Wigan
12:30 GMT				Stadium: Brick Community Stadium
Note: Live on Sky Sports

27 February 2027 33	Plymouth Argyle	v	Sheffield Wednesday	Plymouth
15:00 GMT				Stadium: Home Park

6 March 2027 34	Sheffield Wednesday	v	Leyton Orient	Sheffield
15:00 GMT				Stadium: Hillsborough Stadium

13 March 2027 35	Bradford City	v	Sheffield Wednesday	Bradford
15:00 GMT				Stadium: University of Bradford Stadium

20 March 2027 36	Sheffield Wednesday	v	Barnsley	Sheffield
15:00 GMT				Stadium: Hillsborough Stadium

26 March 2027 37	Milton Keynes Dons	v	Sheffield Wednesday	Bletchley
15:00 GMT				Stadium: Stadium MK
Note: Live on Sky Sports

29 March 2027 38	Sheffield Wednesday	v	Burton Albion	Sheffield
15:00 BST				Stadium: Hillsborough Stadium
Note: Live on Sky Sports

3 April 2027 39	Mansfield Town	v	Sheffield Wednesday	Mansfield
15:00 BST				Stadium: One Call Stadium

10 April 2027 40	Sheffield Wednesday	v	Leicester City	Sheffield
15:00 BST				Stadium: Hillsborough Stadium

13 April 2027 41	Sheffield Wednesday	v	Stevenage	Sheffield
19:45 BST				Stadium: Hillsborough Stadium
Note: Live on Sky Sports

17 April 2027 42	Stockport County	v	Sheffield Wednesday	Stockport
15:00 BST				Stadium: Edgeley Park

24 April 2027 43	Sheffield Wednesday	v	Milton Keynes Dons	Sheffield
15:00 BST				Stadium: Hillsborough Stadium

27 April 2027 44	Cambridge United	v	Sheffield Wednesday	Cambridge
19:45 BST				Stadium: Cledara Abbey Stadium
Note: Live on Sky Sports

1 May 2027 45	Reading	v	Sheffield Wednesday	Reading
15:00 BST				Stadium: Select Car Leasing Stadium

8 May 2027 46	Sheffield Wednesday	v	Oxford United	Sheffield
15:00 BST				Stadium: Hillsborough Stadium

=== FA Cup ===
The first round draw was made on 19 October, where Sheffield Wednesday were drawn away to Oldham Athletic.

8 November 2026 First round	Oldham Athletic	2–1 (a.e.t.)	Sheffield Wednesday	Oldham
17:15 GMT	Kavanagh 66'; Scott-Morriss (yellow card) 90+1'; Monthé (yellow card) 105'; Sutton 110'	Report	Bernard (yellow card) 7'; Valery (yellow card) 29'; Keillor-Dunn 76'; Slattery (yellow card) 85'; Fusire (yellow card) 90'	Stadium: Boundary Park; Attendance: 6,545; Referee: Martin Woods
Note: Live on TNT Sports

=== EFL Cup ===
On 25 June, the draw for the first round was made, with Sheffield Wednesday being drawn against Bolton Wanderers for the second season in a row in the first round. Wednesday were drawn at home to Wolverhampton Wanderers following the second round draw on 10 August 2026.

8 August 2026 First round	Sheffield Wednesday	1–0	Bolton Wanderers	Sheffield
15:00 BST	J. Lowe 70'	Report	Famewo (yellow card) 37'; Simons (red card) 56'; Stephenson (yellow card) 83'	Stadium: Hillsborough Stadium; Attendance: 15,834; Referee: Elliot Bell
Note: Live on Sky Sports

25 August 2026 Second round	Sheffield Wednesday	0–2	Wolverhampton Wanderers	Sheffield
19:45 BST	Thornton (yellow card) 8'	Report	Swinkels 3' (o.g.); Traoré (yellow card) 32'; Olagunju 45+1'	Stadium: Hillsborough Stadium; Attendance: 13,586; Referee: Ben Speedie
Note: Live on Sky Sports

=== EFL Trophy ===
Sheffield Wednesday were drawn in Group A of the northern section alongside Accrington Stanley, Salford City and Sunderland U21.

Pos	Div	Team	Pld	W	PW	PL	L	GF	GA	GD	Pts	Qualification
1	L2	Accrington Stanley	3	1	2	0	0	8	4	+4	7	Advance to Round 2
2	L1	Sheffield Wednesday	3	2	0	0	1	4	5	−1	6	Advance to Round 2
3	L2	Salford City	2	0	0	1	1	2	3	−1	1	
4	ACA	Sunderland U21	2	0	0	1	1	3	5	−2	1	

Updated to match(es) played on 11 October 2026. Source: EFL

22 September 2026 North Group A	Salford City	1–2	Sheffield Wednesday	Kersal
19:00 BST	Woodburn 34', (yellow card) 75'; Butcher (yellow card) 45+2'; Awe (yellow card) 69'; Graydon (yellow card) 73'	Report	Keillor-Dunn 50'; Heskey (yellow card) 57'; J. Lowe 77' (pen.)	Stadium: AIG Stadium; Attendance: 2,347; Referee: Aaron Jackson
Note: Live on Sky Sports

6 October 2026 North Group A	Sheffield Wednesday	2–0	Sunderland U21	Sheffield
19:00 BST	Heskey 21'; Bannan 80'	Report		Stadium: Hillsborough Stadium; Attendance: 5,423; Referee: Simon Hooper
Note: Live on Sky Sports

11 November 2026 North Group A	Sheffield Wednesday	0–4	Accrington Stanley	Sheffield
19:00 GMT	Thornton (yellow card) 52'; Onoh (yellow card) 67'	Report	Rawson (yellow card) 32'; J. Smith 39'; Brown 42'; O. Smith (yellow card) 82'; Warren 86'; Caton (yellow card) 90+5'	Stadium: Hillsborough Stadium; Attendance: 5,472; Referee: Robert Massey-Ellis
Note: Live on Sky Sports

== Transfers & contracts ==
=== In ===
Date	Pos.	Player	From	Fee	Ref.
19 June 2026	CB	(Cape Verde) Ricardo Santos	(Wales) Swansea City	Undisclosed	
27 June 2026	RB	(Burundi) Jordi Liongola	(Belgium) La Louvière	Undisclosed	
1 July 2026 (Note: The transfer was announced on 29 June, and would become official on July 1 once his Motherwell contract expired)	CM	(England) Callum Slattery	(Scotland) Motherwell	Free	
2 July 2026	CB	(Netherlands) Sil Swinkels	(England) Aston Villa	Undisclosed	
9 July 2026	CM	(Scotland) Barry Bannan	(England) Millwall	Undisclosed	
9 July 2026	LW	(England) Louie Barry	(England) Aston Villa	Undisclosed	
11 July 2026	GK	(England) Joe Lumley	(England) Bristol City	Free	
19 July 2026	DM	(England) Billy Mitchell	(England) Millwall	Free	
30 July 2026	GK	(England) Connal Trueman	(England) Milton Keynes Dons	Free	
31 July 2026	GK	(Australia) Ashley Maynard-Brewer	(Scotland) Dundee United	Free	
7 August 2026	CM	(England) Tyler Onyango	(England) Everton	Free	
24 August 2026	LB	(England) Reece James	(England) Rotherham United	Free	
8 September 2026	AM	(Scotland) Josh Bayliss †	(England) Gillingham	Free	
8 September 2026	CM	(England) Fortune Onoh †	(England) Grimsby Town	Free	
8 September 2026	CM	(England) Joel Martin †	(England) Bradford City	Free	
8 September 2026	LB	(England) Louis Poland †	(England) Everton	Free	
8 September 2026	RB	(England) Will McPartland †	(England) Middlesbrough	Free	
8 September 2026	CF	(Nigeria) Samuel Duruh †	(Scotland) Kilmarnock	Free	

† Signed for the academy

=== Out ===
Date	Pos.	Player	To	Fee	Ref.
1 July 2026	CM	(Sweden) Svante Ingelsson	(England) Stoke City	Undisclosed (Note: Deal could exceed £1million)	
1 July 2026	LW	(Poland) Olaf Kobacki	(Poland) Wisła Płock	Undisclosed	
10 July 2026	GK	(Northern Ireland) Pierce Charles	(England) Manchester City	Undisclosed (Note: Initial £3 million, potentially raising to beyond £10 million)	

=== Loaned in ===
Date	Pos.	Player	Loaned from	Date until	Ref.
7 July 2026	CF	(England) Harry Gray	(England) Leeds United	End of season	
31 July 2026	CF	(England) Mason Burstow	(England) Hull City	End of season	
20 August 2026	RW	(Northern Ireland) Kieran Morrison	(England) Liverpool	End of season	
26 August 2026	CF	(Iraq) Ali Al-Hamadi	(England) Ipswich Town	End of season	
1 September 2026	CM	(England) Jaden Heskey	(England) Manchester City	End of season	
3 September 2026	CF	(England) Davis Keillor-Dunn	(Wales) Wrexham	2 January 2027	

=== Loaned out ===
Date	Pos.	Player	Loaned to	Date until	Ref.
20 July 2026	GK	(Wales) Logan Stretch	(England) Buxton	End of season	
29 July 2026	LB	(England) Reece Johnson	(England) Eastleigh	End of season	
2 August 2026	CF	(Canada) Iké Ugbo	(Cyprus) Apollon Limassol	End of season	
13 August 2026	CF	(England) Charlie McNeill	(England) Crewe Alexandra	End of season	
15 August 2026	GK	(Australia) Ashley Maynard-Brewer	(England) Gillingham	26 August 2026 (Note: Ashley Maynard-Brewer's loan was extended by a further 7 days on 20 August 2026)	
5 September 2026	CF	(Northern Ireland) Devlan Moses	(England) Buxton	5 December 2026	
11 September 2026	CB	(England) Joe Emery	(England) South Shields	7 November 2026 (Note: Joe Emery's loan was extended by a further 28 days on 13 October 2026)	
10 October 2026	LB	(England) Louis Poland	(England) Stocksbridge Park Steels	7 November 2026	
10 October 2026	CB	(England) Reuben Selby	(England) Stocksbridge Park Steels	Work experience	
30 October 2026	CF	(Nigeria) Samuel Duruh	(England) Beverley Town	28 November 2026	
30 October 2026	CM	(England) Fortune Onoh	(England) Beverley Town	28 November 2026	
2 November 2026	CB	(England) Kailen Hatfield	(England) Stalybridge Celtic	28 November 2026	
6 November 2026	LW	(England) Joel Akpobi	(England) Pontefract Collieries	5 December 2026	
6 November 2026	CM	(England) Denny Oliver	(England) Pontefract Collieries	5 December 2026	
7 November 2026	AM	(Scotland) Joshua Bayliss	(England) Farnborough	5 December 2026	
20 November 2026	CB	(England) Cole McGhee	(England) Torquay United	3 January 2027	

=== Released / Out of Contract ===
Date	Pos.	Player	Subsequent club	Join date	Ref.
30 June 2026	AM	(England) Liam Clayton	(England) Boston United	1 July 2026	
30 June 2026	CB	(England) Mackenzie Maltby	(England) Halifax Town	1 July 2026	
30 June 2026	CM	(England) Rio Shipston	(England) Solihull Moors	7 July 2026	
30 June 2026	LW	(England) Zain Silcott-Duberry	(England) Rochdale	28 July 2026	
30 June 2026	CM	(England) Nathaniel Chalobah	(England) Charlton Athletic	7 August 2026	
30 June 2026	RB	(England) Jacob Jessop	(England) Emley	7 August 2026	
30 June 2026	CM	(Zimbabwe) Marvelous Nakamba	(Greece) Panetolikos	7 August 2026	
30 June 2026	LW	(England) Favour Onukwuli	(England) Cheltenham Town	8 August 2026	
30 June 2026	RB	(Brazil) Gui Siqueira	(England) Buxton	21 August 2026	
30 June 2026	CB	(England) Dominic Iorfa	(England) Rotherham United	15 September 2026	
30 June 2026	RW	(Portugal) Daniel da Costa	(Portugal) Leixões	17 September 2026	
30 June 2026	LB	(England) Harry Evers	(England) Lancaster City	18 September 2026	
30 June 2026	RW	(England) Junior Kamwa			

=== Contracts ===
Date	Pos.	Player	Length	Expiry	Ref.
24 June 2026	CB	(Scotland) Liam Cooper	1 year	30 June 2027	
25 June 2026	LB	(England) Max Lowe	1 year	30 June 2027 (Note: Club option of an additional year)	
30 June 2026	CF	(Wales) Will Grainger	3 years	30 June 2029	
29 July 2026	LB	(England) Reece Johnson	1 year	30 June 2027	
3 August 2026	CM	(England) Jarvis Thornton	2 years	30 June 2028	
5 August 2026	CB	(England) Joe Emery	1 year	30 June 2027	
13 August 2026	CF	(Northern Ireland) Devlan Moses	1 year	30 June 2027	
17 August 2026	GK	(England) Jack Phillips	1 year	30 June 2027	
8 September 2026	CM	(Canada) Aodhan Sopala	–	–	
8 September 2026	CB	(England) Kailen Hatfield	–	–	
23 September 2026	LW	(England) Joel Akpobi	–	–	

== Squad statistics ==
=== Appearances ===
As of 20 November 2026

No.	Pos	Nat	Player	Total		League One		FA Cup		EFL Cup		EFL Trophy	
No.	Pos	Nat	Player	Apps	Goals	Apps	Goals	Apps	Goals	Apps	Goals	Apps	Goals
1	GK	(England) ENG	Joe Lumley	12	0	10	0	0	0	2	0	0	0
2	DF	(Scotland) SCO	Liam Palmer	15	0	3+7	0	1	0	1+1	0	2	0
3	DF	(England) ENG	Max Lowe	10	0	5+2	0	0+1	0	1+1	0	0	0
4	DF	(Cape Verde) CPV	Ricardo Santos	9	0	3+3	0	1	0	1	0	1	0
5	DF	(Jamaica) JAM	Di'Shon Bernard	7	1	5	1	1	0	0	0	1	0
6	DF	(Scotland) SCO	Liam Cooper	13	0	12+1	0	0	0	0	0	0	0
7	DF	(Tunisia) TUN	Yan Valery	16	1	14	1	1	0	1	0	0	0
8	MF	(England) ENG	Callum Slattery	18	3	14	3	1	0	1	0	1+1	0
9	FW	(Jamaica) JAM	Jamal Lowe	17	9	12	7	1	0	0+2	1	0+2	1
10	MF	(Scotland) SCO	Barry Bannan	19	2	15	1	1	0	1+1	0	0+1	1
11	FW	(England) ENG	Louie Barry	8	3	3+3	3	0	0	0+2	0	0	0
12	FW	(Iraq) IRQ	Ali Al-Hamadi	8	0	1+7	0	0	0	0	0	0	0
13	GK	(Australia) AUS	Ashley Maynard-Brewer	7	0	5	0	1	0	0	0	1	0
14	MF	(Zimbabwe) ZIM	Sean Fusire	5	0	0+1	0	0+1	0	0+1	0	2	0
16	MF	(England) ENG	Billy Mitchell	15	1	10+3	1	0	0	1	0	1	0
18	MF	(England) ENG	Jaden Heskey	13	1	7+3	0	1	0	0	0	2	1
19	FW	(Wales) WAL	Will Grainger	5	0	0+1	0	0+1	0	1+1	0	1	0
20	FW	(Northern Ireland) NIR	Kieran Morrison	14	0	4+8	0	0+1	0	1	0	0	0
21	MF	(England) ENG	Tyler Onyango	1	0	1	0	0	0	0	0	0	0
22	DF	(Republic of Ireland) IRL	Gabriel Otegbayo	15	1	4+6	1	0	0	1+1	0	2+1	0
23	MF	(Burundi) BDI	Jordi Liongola	4	0	1+1	0	1	0	1	0	0	0
24	FW	(England) ENG	Harry Gray	13	1	6+5	1	0	0	2	0	0	0
26	DF	(Netherlands) NED	Sil Swinkels	8	0	4+2	0	0	0	2	0	0	0
27	GK	(England) ENG	Connal Trueman	3	0	0	0	0+1	0	0	0	2	0
29	FW	(England) ENG	George Brown	1	0	0	0	0	0	0	0	1	0
30	DF	(England) ENG	Ernie Weaver	7	0	2+2	0	0+1	0	0	0	2	0
31	DF	(England) ENG	Louis Poland	1	0	0	0	0	0	0	0	1	0
33	DF	(England) ENG	Reece James	12	0	9	0	0	0	1	0	1+1	0
34	MF	(England) ENG	Fortune Onoh	1	0	0	0	0	0	0	0	0+1	0
36	MF	(England) ENG	James Kay	1	0	0	0	0	0	0	0	0+1	0
37	MF	(England) ENG	Jarvis Thornton	7	0	0+2	0	0	0	2	0	3	0
41	FW	(England) ENG	Kleven De Oliveira	1	0	0	0	0	0	0	0	0+1	0
42	DF	(England) ENG	Will McPartland	1	0	0	0	0	0	0	0	0+1	0
43	FW	(England) ENG	Charlie Liddell	1	0	0	0	0	0	0	0	0+1	0
48	FW	(England) ENG	Mason Burstow	15	2	6+5	2	0	0	2	0	2	0
50	FW	(England) ENG	Davis Keillor-Dunn	13	6	9+2	4	1	1	0	0	1	1
Players out on loan:
28	DF	(England) ENG	Cole McGhee	1	0	0	0	0	0	0	0	1	0
38	MF	(England) ENG	Denny Oliver	2	0	0	0	0	0	0	0	1+1	0
40	FW	(Northern Ireland) NIR	Devlan Moses	1	0	0	0	0	0	0+1	0	0	0
44	FW	(England) ENG	Joel Akpobi	3	0	0	0	0	0	0	0	3	0
46	DF	(England) ENG	Kailen Hatfield	1	0	0	0	0	0	0	0	0+1	0
47	FW	(Nigeria) NGR	Samuel Duruh	3	0	0	0	0	0	0	0	1+2	0

=== Goalscorers ===
As of 20 November 2026

Rank	Pos.	Nat.	No.	Player	League One	FA Cup	EFL Cup	EFL Trophy	Total
1	FW	(Jamaica)	9	Jamal Lowe	7	0	1	1	9
2	FW	(England)	50	Davis Keillor-Dunn	4	1	0	1	6
3	MF	(England)	8	Callum Slattery	3	0	0	0	3
3	FW	(England)	11	Louie Barry	3	0	0	0	3
4	MF	(Scotland)	10	Barry Bannan	1	0	0	1	2
4	FW	(England)	48	Mason Burstow	2	0	0	0	2
5	DF	(Jamaica)	5	Di'Shon Bernard	1	0	0	0	1
5	DF	(Tunisia)	7	Yan Valery	1	0	0	0	1
5	MF	(England)	16	Billy Mitchell	1	0	0	0	1
5	MF	(England)	18	Jaden Heskey	0	0	0	1	1
5	DF	(Republic of Ireland)	22	Gabriel Otegbayo	1	0	0	0	1
5	FW	(England)	24	Harry Gray	1	0	0	0	1
Own goals					2	0	0	0	2
Total					27	1	1	4	33

=== Assists ===
As of 20 November 2026

Rank	Pos.	Nat.	No.	Player	League One	FA Cup	EFL Cup	EFL Trophy	Total
1	MF	(Scotland)	10	Barry Bannan	2	0	1	0	3
1	FW	(Northern Ireland)	20	Kieran Morrison	3	0	0	0	3
2	MF	(England)	8	Callum Slattery	2	0	0	0	2
2	FW	(Jamaica)	9	Jamal Lowe	2	0	0	0	2
2	MF	(Zimbabwe)	14	Sean Fusire	0	1	0	1	2
3	DF	(Scotland)	6	Liam Cooper	1	0	0	0	1
3	FW	(England)	11	Louie Barry	1	0	0	0	1
3	DF	(England)	33	Reece James	1	0	0	0	1
3	FW	(England)	44	Joel Akpobi	0	0	0	1	1
3	FW	(Nigeria)	47	Samuel Duruh	0	0	0	1	1
3	FW	(England)	48	Mason Burstow	1	0	0	0	1
3	FW	(England)	50	Davis Keillor-Dunn	1	0	0	0	1
Total					13	1	1	3	18

=== Disciplinary record ===
As of 20 November 2026

No.	Pos.	Player	League One		FA Cup		EFL Cup		EFL Trophy		Total	
No.	Pos.	Player	Yellow card	Red card	Yellow card	Red card	Yellow card	Red card	Yellow card	Red card	Yellow card	Red card
1	GK	Joe Lumley	1	0	0	0	0	0	0	0	1	0
2	DF	Liam Palmer	1	0	0	0	0	0	0	0	1	0
5	DF	Di'Shon Bernard	0	0	1	0	0	0	0	0	1	0
6	DF	Liam Cooper	3	0	0	0	0	0	0	0	3	0
7	DF	Yan Valery	2	0	1	0	0	0	0	0	3	0
8	MF	Callum Slattery	6	0	1	0	0	0	0	0	7	0
9	FW	Jamal Lowe	0	1	0	0	0	0	0	0	0	1
10	MF	Barry Bannan	2	0	0	0	0	0	0	0	2	0
12	FW	Ali Al-Hamadi	1	0	0	0	0	0	0	0	1	0
14	DF	Sean Fusire	0	0	1	0	0	0	0	0	1	0
16	MF	Billy Mitchell	4	0	0	0	0	0	0	0	4	0
18	MF	Jaden Heskey	3	0	0	0	0	0	1	0	4	0
20	FW	Kieran Morrison	1	0	0	0	0	0	0	0	1	0
22	DF	Gabriel Otegbayo	1	0	0	0	0	0	0	0	1	0
24	FW	Harry Gray	2	0	0	0	0	0	0	0	2	0
26	DF	Sil Swinkels	1	1	0	0	0	0	0	0	1	1
33	DF	Reece James	3	0	0	0	0	0	0	0	3	0
34	MF	Fortune Onoh	0	0	0	0	0	0	1	0	1	0
37	MF	Jarvis Thornton	0	0	0	0	1	0	1	0	2	0
48	FW	Mason Burstow	1	0	0	0	0	0	0	0	1	0

=== Clean sheets ===
As of 20 November 2026

No.	Nat.	Player	Matches played	Clean sheet %	League One	FA Cup	EFL Cup	EFL Trophy	Total
1	(England)	Joe Lumley	12	33.33%	3	0	1	0	4
13	(Australia)	Ashley Maynard-Brewer	7	28.57%	1	1	0	0	2
27	(England)	Connal Trueman	3	33.33%	0	0	0	1	1

== Awards ==
=== Club awards ===
==== Club Player of the Month ====
Player of the Month awards for the 2026–27 season.

Month	First	%	Second	%	Third	%	Ref
August	(England) Callum Slattery	56%	(Jamaica) Jamal Lowe	17%	(England) Louie Barry	17%	
September	(Scotland) Liam Cooper	50%	(England) Reece James	16%	–	–	
October	(England) Reece James	34%	(Scotland) Liam Cooper	32%	(England) Davis Keillor-Dunn	10%	

=== EFL awards ===
==== EFL League One Manager of the Month ====
Month	Manager		Ref.
August	(Denmark) Henrik Pedersen	Nomination	

==== EFL League One Player of the Month ====
Month	Player		Ref.
August	(Jamaica) Jamal Lowe	Winner	
