= Jamal Lowe =

Jamaica international footballer (born 1994)

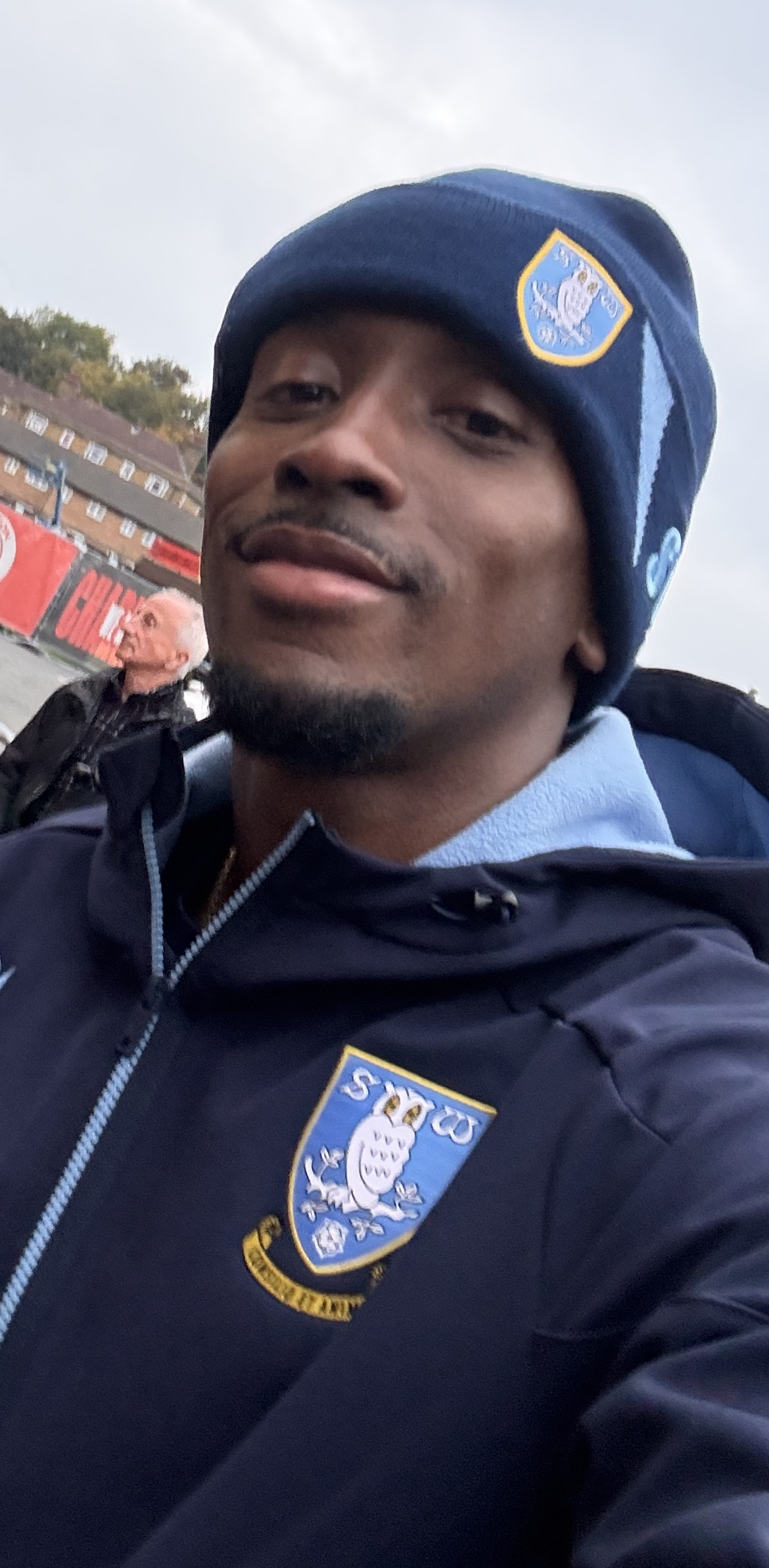
- Lowe with Sheffield Wednesday in 2025

Personal information
- Full name: Jamal Akua Lowe
- Date of birth: 21 July 1994 (age 32)
- Place of birth: Harrow, England
- Height: 1.83 m (6 ft 0 in)
- Positions: Forward; winger

Team information
- Current team: Sheffield Wednesday
- Number: 9

Youth career
- 2008: Queens Park Rangers
- Farnborough
- Barnet

Senior career*
Years	Team	Apps	(Gls)
2011–2015	Barnet	13	(0)
2012–2013	→ Hayes & Yeading United (loan)	3	(3)
2013	→ Boreham Wood (loan)	3	(0)
2013	→ Hitchin Town (loan)	13	(1)
2013–2014	→ St Albans City (loan)	16	(5)
2014	→ Farnborough (loan)	5	(0)
2014	→ Hemel Hempstead Town (loan)	9	(2)
2015	St Albans City	14	(1)
2015	Hemel Hempstead Town	11	(1)
2015–2017	Hampton & Richmond Borough	48	(29)
2017–2019	Portsmouth	103	(25)
2019–2020	Wigan Athletic	46	(6)
2020–2021	Swansea City	51	(14)
2021–2024	AFC Bournemouth	36	(7)
2023	→ Queens Park Rangers (loan)	20	(3)
2023–2024	→ Swansea City (loan)	35	(9)
2024–	Sheffield Wednesday	82	(14)

International career^{‡}
2016	England C	1	(1)
2021–	Jamaica	10	(2)
Medal record
Men's football
Representing Jamaica
CONCACAF Nations League
Bronze medal – third place	2024 United States	Team
- * Club domestic league appearances and goals as of 21:54, 20 November 2026 (UTC) ‡ National team caps and goals as of 07:39, 27 March 2026 (UTC)

Jamal Akua Lowe (born 21 July 1994) is a professional footballer who plays as a forward and winger for EFL League One club Sheffield Wednesday and the Jamaica national team. He was born in England and played for the England C team, before making his full international debut for Jamaica in 2021.

Lowe began his professional playing career with Barnet in 2012. After several loan spells, he briefly played for St Albans City and Hemel Hempstead Town. Lowe joined Hampton & Richmond Borough in 2015 before moving to Portsmouth two years later, spending two seasons with the club. He was signed by Wigan Athletic in 2019 and joined Swansea City in 2020. In 2021 he was signed by AFC Bournemouth, and since then he has gone out on loan to Queens Park Rangers.

== Club career ==
=== Barnet ===
Lowe first featured for the Bees' senior team in February 2011 in the Herts Senior Cup against Hadley. In the 2011–12 season, Lowe scored 19 goals for Barnet's under-18 team. He made his league debut on 25 August 2012, in a 3–1 loss against York City at Underhill, coming on as a late substitute for Curtis Weston. After making a second substitute appearance against Gillingham, he was given his first start by manager Mark Robson on 15 September in a 3–0 loss against Bradford City.

Lowe signed a professional contract with the Bees in October 2012. He made his FA Cup debut on 3 November, coming on as a substitute in the second half of a 2–0 defeat against Oxford United in the first round. In December 2012, he was loaned out to Hayes & Yeading United. He joined Boreham Wood on 15 February 2013.

On 15 August 2013, Lowe joined Hitchin Town on loan. His fourth loan spell away from the club began when he joined St Albans City on 22 November. Then, his fifth loan spell came when he joined Farnborough on 28 February 2014. Lowe was transfer-listed at the end of the 2013–14 season. Manager Martin Allen said: "He is a good lad who has worked hard and done well in both the games he has played but I need to bring in another striker and this will push Jamal further down the line".

In 2014–15, Lowe made two substitute appearances for the Bees before joining Hemel Hempstead Town on a three-month loan. On 16 January 2015, he left Barnet permanently to join St Albans City. At the end of the season he rejoined Hemel Hempstead Town. After 11 league games he then joined Hampton & Richmond Borough.

=== Portsmouth ===
On 28 October 2016, Portsmouth agreed terms to sign Lowe for an undisclosed fee on an 18-month contract. Jamal Lowe helped Portsmouth to win the 16/17 League Two title, scoring a goal in the final match that saw them champions of the league and automatic promotion to League One where he stayed and became a permanent player in the squad. He was also in the squad that won the EFL Trophy in 2019. In January 2018 Lowe signed a new contract keeping him at Fratton Park until 2021.

=== Wigan Athletic ===
On 1 August 2019, Lowe signed a three-year contract with Wigan Athletic for an undisclosed fee. He scored his first goal for the club on 20 October 2019 against Nottingham Forest.

=== Swansea City ===
On 27 August 2020, Lowe joined Championship club Swansea City for £800,000, signing a three-year contract with an option of a further year. He scored his first goal for Swansea in a 2–0 win over Wycombe Wanderers on 26 September 2020.

=== AFC Bournemouth ===
On 31 August 2021, Lowe signed a three-year contract with Swansea's Championship rivals AFC Bournemouth, joining for a reported fee of £1.5 million.

==== Queens Park Rangers (loan) ====
On 11 January 2023, Lowe joined EFL Championship promotion hopefuls Queens Park Rangers on a six-month loan deal.

==== Swansea City (loan) ====
On 5 June 2024, Bournemouth announced the player would leave in the summer when his contract expired.

=== Sheffield Wednesday ===
On 30 June 2024, Sheffield Wednesday confirmed he would be signing for the club. He made his Wednesday debut against Plymouth Argyle on 11 August 2024, scoring the first goal as they went on to win the game 4–0. Following the end of the 2025–26 season, it was confirmed that he had triggered an automatic contract renewal keeping him at Wednesday until the summer of 2027.

He started the 2026–27 season in bright form, playing either on the right or through the middle, he scored 3 goals and an assist in the opening 3 games which saw him win the EFL League One Player of the Month award for August.

== International career ==
Despite being born in England and having previously played for the England C team, in March 2021 Lowe received his first call-up to the Jamaica national team. This came about as part of the Jamaican Football Federation's attempt to target a number of English-born players for call ups in an attempt to improve the chances of Jamaica qualifying for the 2022 World Cup. On 25 March 2021, Lowe scored his first goal on his debut in a 4–1 loss to United States.

== Personal life ==
Born in England, Lowe is of Jamaican descent. Lowe worked as a PE teacher while playing in non-league football. He is friends with Nicke Kabamba and Junior Morias.

== Career statistics ==
=== Club ===
As of 20 November 2026

Appearances and goals by club, season and competition
Club	Season	League			FA Cup		League Cup		Other		Total	
Club	Season	Division	Apps	Goals	Apps	Goals	Apps	Goals	Apps	Goals	Apps	Goals
Barnet	2010–11	League Two	0	0	0	0	0	0	2 (Note: Appearance in Herts Senior Cup)	0	2	0
Barnet	2011–12	League Two	0	0	0	0	0	0	1	1	1	1
Barnet	2012–13	League Two	8	0	1	0	0	0	2 (Note: One appearance in Football League Trophy, one appearance and two goals in Herts Senior Cup)	2	11	2
Barnet	2013–14	Conference Premier	3	0	—		—		0	0	3	0
Barnet	2014–15	Conference Premier	2	0	—		—		0	0	2	0
Barnet	Total		13	0	1	0	0	0	5	3	19	3
Hayes & Yeading United (loan)	2012–13	Conference South	3	3	—		—		0	0	3	3
Boreham Wood (loan)	2012–13	Conference South	3	0	—		—		0	0	3	0
Hitchin Town (loan)	2013–14	Southern League; Premier Division	13	1	2	0	—		3 (Note: Two appearances in FA Trophy, one appearance in Southern League Cup, one appearance in Herts Senior Cup)	0	19	1
St Albans City (loan)	2013–14	Southern League; Premier Division	16	5	—		—		1 (Note: Appearance in Southern League Cup)	0	17	5
Farnborough (loan)	2013–14	Conference South	5	0	—		—		0	0	5	0
Hemel Hempstead Town (loan)	2014–15	Conference South	9	2	5	1	—		1	2	15	5
St Albans City	2014–15	Conference South	14	1	—		—		0	0	14	1
Hemel Hempstead Town	2015–16	National League South	11	1	3	0	—		1 (Note: Appearance in Herts Charity Cup)	1	15	2
Hampton & Richmond Borough	2015–16	Isthmian League; Premier Division	26	14	—		—		2 (Note: Appearances in FA Trophy)	1	28	15
Hampton & Richmond Borough	2016–17	National League South	22	15	2	2	—		4 (Note: Two appearances and one goal in FA Trophy, one appearance in Isthmian League Charity Shield, one appearance and four goals in Middlesex Senior Cup)	5	28	22
Hampton & Richmond Borough	Total		48	29	2	2	—		6	6	56	37
Portsmouth	2016–17	League Two	14	4	—		—		—		14	4
Portsmouth	2017–18	League One	44	6	1	0	0	0	5 (Note: Appearances in EFL Trophy)	2	50	8
Portsmouth	2018–19	League One	45	15	4	1	1	0	5 (Note: Three appearances and one goal in EFL Trophy, two appearances in League One play-offs)	1	55	17
Portsmouth	Total		103	25	5	1	1	0	10	3	119	29
Wigan Athletic	2019–20	Championship	46	6	1	0	1	0	—		48	6
Swansea City	2020–21	Championship	44	14	2	0	1	0	—		47	14
AFC Bournemouth	2021–22	Championship	34	7	1	0	1	0	—		36	7
AFC Bournemouth	2022–23	Premier League	2	0	0	0	2	1	—		4	1
AFC Bournemouth	Total		36	7	1	0	3	1	—		40	8
Queens Park Rangers (loan)	2022–23	Championship	20	3	0	0	0	0	—		20	3
Swansea City (loan)	2023–24	Championship	35	9	0	0	0	0	—		35	9
Sheffield Wednesday	2024–25	Championship	24	3	1	0	3	1	—		28	4
Sheffield Wednesday	2025–26	Championship	45	4	0	0	3	1	—		48	5
Sheffield Wednesday	2026–27	League One	12	7	1	0	2	1	2 (Note: Appearances in EFL Trophy)	1	17	9
Sheffield Wednesday	Total		81	14	1	0	8	3	2	1	92	18
Career total			500	117	24	4	13	4	29	16	567	144

=== International ===
As of match played 26 March 2026

Appearances and goals by national team and year
National team	Year	Apps	Goals
Jamaica	2021	3	1
Jamaica	2022	2	1
Jamaica	2023	1	0
Jamaica	2024	3	0
Jamaica	2025	0	0
Jamaica	2026	1	0
Total		10	2

Scores and results list Jamaica's goal tally first, score column indicates score after each Lowe goal.

List of international goals scored by Jamal Lowe
No.	Date	Venue	Opponent	Score	Result	Competition
1	25 March 2021	Stadion Wiener Neustadt, Wiener Neustadt, Austria	United States	1–2	1–4	Friendly
2	7 June 2022	Independence Park, Kingston, Jamaica	Suriname	3–1	3–1	2022–23 CONCACAF Nations League A

== Honours ==
Hampton & Richmond Borough

- Isthmian Premier League: 2015–16

Portsmouth

- EFL League Two: 2016–17
- EFL Trophy: 2018–19

AFC Bournemouth

- EFL Championship second-place promotion: 2021–22

Individual

- PFA Team of the Year: 2018–19 League One
- EFL League One Player of the Month: August 2026
