= Harry Gray (footballer, born 2008) =

English footballer (born 2008)

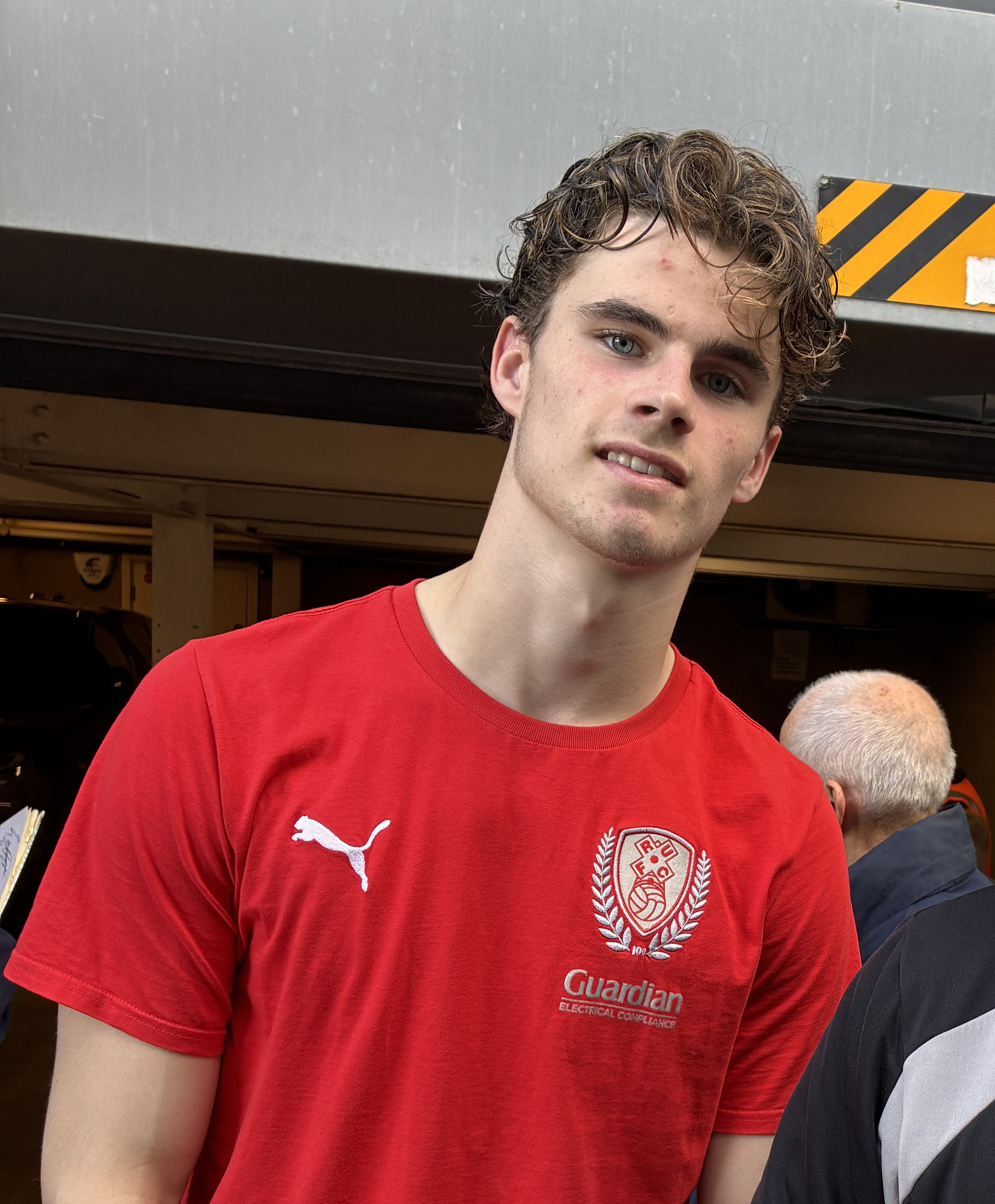
- Gray with Rotherham United in 2026

Personal information
- Full name: Harry Andrew Gray
- Date of birth: 8 October 2008 (age 18)
- Place of birth: London
- Height: 6 ft 1 in (1.86 m)
- Position: Forward

Team information
- Current team: Sheffield Wednesday (on loan from Leeds United)
- Number: 24

Youth career
- Leeds United

Senior career*
Years	Team	Apps	(Gls)
2025–	Leeds United	1	(0)
2026	→ Rotherham United (loan)	20	(3)
2026–	→ Sheffield Wednesday (loan)	11	(1)

International career^{‡}
2023	England U15	4	(0)
2023–2024	England U16	6	(0)
2025–	England U17	5	(1)
2026–	England U19	4	(0)
- * Club domestic league appearances and goals as of 22:01, 20 November 2026 (UTC) ‡ National team caps and goals as of 13:56, 5 October 2026 (UTC)

Harry Andrew Gray (born 8 October 2008) is an English professional footballer who plays as a forward for EFL League One club Sheffield Wednesday on loan from Premier League club Leeds United.

== Club career ==
=== Leeds United ===
A product of Leeds United's youth academy, Gray started playing with Leeds Under-18s as a 14-year old in 2023.

He debuted with Leeds United in a non-competitive friendly against Harrogate Town in July 2024, and was part of the club's pre-season squad in the summer of 2024. In March 2025, Gray started training with Leeds United's senior team.

At the age of 16 he made his Leeds first-team debut at Elland Road as an 86th-minute substitute for Brenden Aaronson in a 6–0 Championship league win over Stoke City on 21 April 2025.

On 30 April 2025, he helped the Leeds U21s win the 2024–25 National League Cup, and scored his side's second goal in a 2–1 win over the Sutton United U21s to clinch the trophy.

He was on the bench when Leeds won the 2024–25 EFL Championship in a 2–1 win over Plymouth Argyle on 3 May 2025.

Gray would go on to feature in several pre-season games in the following season, showing promise earning an assist against 3. Liga side SC Verl and hitting the crossbar against La Liga side Villareal CF. Despite this, Gray did not earn any minutes in Leeds’ Premier League campaign whilst he was present at the club, only featuring occasionally as an unused substitute.

==== Rotherham United (loan) ====
On 14 January 2026, Gray joined League One side Rotherham United on loan for the remainder of the 2025–26 season. Gray scored his first goal at senior level in a 2–1 win against Northampton Town. Gray started in a 3–0 defeat to Wigan Athletic on the 14 April 2026 which would see his side relegated to League Two despite having four games left to play.

==== Sheffield Wednesday (loan) ====
On 7 July 2026, Gray joined League One club Sheffield Wednesday on a season-long loan for the 2026–27 season. He was one of eight players to make their debut against Bolton Wanderers in the EFL Cup, starting the game in a 1–0 win. His first goal for the club came in October, scoring the third goal in a 5–0 win against AFC Wimbledon.

== International career ==
Born in England, Gray is of Scottish descent and can play for either national team. He made five appearances for the England U16s from 2023 to 2024. He was called up to the England U17s for a set of friendlies in March 2025. Gray was included in the squad for the 2025 UEFA European Under-17 Championship and scored a goal in their last group game against Czech Republic.

== Personal life ==
Harry is the son of the Scotland international footballer Andy Gray and Giorgina. He is also the grandson of Frank Gray, and the great nephew of Eddie Gray, all of whom played for Leeds United and represented Scotland at international level. He is one of four brothers, including Archie Gray who is also a professional footballer.

== Career statistics ==
As of 20 November 2026

Appearances and goals by club, season and competition
Club	Season	League			FA Cup		EFL Cup		Other		Total	
Club	Season	Division	Apps	Goals	Apps	Goals	Apps	Goals	Apps	Goals	Apps	Goals
Leeds United U21	2024–25	—			—		—		2 (Note: Appearances in National League Cup)	1	2	1
Leeds United U21	2025–26	—			—		—		3 (Note: Two appearances, three goals in National League Cup; one appearance in EFL Trophy)	3	3	3
Leeds United U21	Total		—		—		—		5	4	5	4
Leeds United	2024–25	Championship	1	0	0	0	0	0	—		1	0
Leeds United	2025–26	Premier League	0	0	0	0	0	0	—		0	0
Leeds United	2026–27	Premier League	0	0	0	0	0	0	—		0	0
Leeds United	Total		1	0	0	0	0	0	0	0	1	0
Rotherham United (loan)	2025–26	League One	20	3	0	0	0	0	0	0	20	3
Sheffield Wednesday (loan)	2026–27	League One	11	1	0	0	2	0	0	0	13	1
Career total			32	4	0	0	2	0	5	4	39	8

== Honours ==
Leeds United

- EFL Championship: 2024–25

Leeds United U21

- National League Cup: 2024–25
