= Jordi Liongola =

Burundian association football player

Personal information
- Full name: Jordi Baininwa Liongola
- Date of birth: 17 May 2000 (age 26)
- Place of birth: Tessenderlo, Belgium
- Height: 6 ft 1 in (1.85 m)
- Position: Defender

Team information
- Current team: Sheffield Wednesday
- Number: 23

Youth career
- Standard Liège
- 2019–2020: Royal Antwerp

Senior career*
Years	Team	Apps	(Gls)
2021–2022	Lierse Kempenzonen	22	(1)
2022–2026	La Louvière	116	(15)
2026–	Sheffield Wednesday	2	(0)

International career^{‡}
2016	Belgium U16	1	(1)
2022–	Burundi	17	(1)
- * Club domestic league appearances and goals as of 22:01, 20 November 2026 (UTC) ‡ National team caps and goals as of 18:08, 18 November 2026 (UTC)

Jordi Baininwa Liongola (born 17 May 2000) is a professional footballer who plays as a defender for EFL League One club Sheffield Wednesday. Born in Belgium, he plays for the Burundi national team.

== Club career ==
Liongola is a former youth academy player of Standard Liège and Royal Antwerp. In July 2021, he signed a one-year deal with Belgian second division club Lierse Kempenzonen. He made his professional debut on 22 August 2021 in a 2–0 league win against R.E. Virton.

In July 2022, Liongola joined RAAL La Louvière.

On 27 June 2026, Liongola joined EFL League One club Sheffield Wednesday on a three-year contract, signing for an undisclosed fee. He was one of eight players to make their debut against Bolton Wanderers in the EFL Cup, starting the game in a 1–0 win.

== International career ==
Born in Belgium, Liongola is of Burundian descent, thus making him eligible to represent both countries. He has represented Belgium at youth international level.

In November 2019, he received his first call-up to the Burundi national team for 2021 Africa Cup of Nations qualification matches against Morocco and the Central African Republic. He debuted with Burundi in a 2–1 friendly win over Liberia on 29 March 2022.

== Career statistics ==
=== Club ===
As of 20 November 2026

Club	Season	League			National cup (Note: Includes Belgian Cup, FA Cup)		League cup (Note: Includes EFL Cup)		Other		Total	
Club	Season	Division	Apps	Goals	Apps	Goals	Apps	Goals	Apps	Goals	Apps	Goals
Lierse Kempenzonen	2021–22	Belgian First Division B	22	1	2	1	—		—		24	2
La Louvière	2022–23	Belgian Division 1	32	5	1	0	—		—		33	5
La Louvière	2023–24	Belgian Division 1	29	4	2	0	—		—		31	4
La Louvière	2024–25	Challenger Pro League	28	5	0	0	—		—		28	5
La Louvière	2025–26	Belgian Pro League	27	1	1	0	—		4 (Note: Appearance(s) in Belgian Pro League Relegation Playoffs)	1	32	2
La Louvière	Total		116	15	4	0	0	0	4	1	124	16
Sheffield Wednesday	2026–27	EFL League One	2	0	1	0	1	0	0	0	4	0
Career total			140	16	7	1	1	0	4	1	152	18

=== International ===
As of 17 November 2026

Appearances and goals by national team and year
National team	Year	Apps	Goals
Burundi	2022	1	0
Burundi	2023	4	0
Burundi	2024	6	0
Burundi	2025	4	0
Burundi	2026	2	1
Total		17	1

Scores and results list Burundi's goal tally first.

No.	Date	Venue	Opponent	Score	Result	Competition
1.	27 March 2026	Stade Olympique Maréchal Idriss Déby Itno, N'Djamena, Chad	Chad	1–0	4–0	2027 AFCON qualification
