= Pape Moussa Fall =

Senegalese footballer (born 2004)

Personal information
- Date of birth: 4 July 2004 (age 22)
- Place of birth: Pikine, Senegal
- Height: 2.03 m (6 ft 8 in)
- Position: Striker

Team information
- Current team: Metz
- Number: 11

Youth career
- Gesfoot
- 2022–2023: Génération Foot

Senior career*
Years	Team	Apps	(Gls)
2023–2024	RFC Seraing	24	(10)
2024–	Metz	1	(1)
2024–2025	→ RFC Seraing (loan)	14	(7)
2025–2026	→ RAAL La Louvière (loan)	27	(11)

International career^{‡}
2026–	Senegal	3	(0)
- * Club domestic league appearances and goals as of 8 August 2026 (UTC) ‡ National team caps and goals as of 4 October 2026 (UTC)

Pape Moussa Fall (born 4 July 2004) is a Senegalese professional footballer who plays as a striker for Ligue 2 club Metz and the Senegal national team.

== Club career ==
Fall is a product of the youth academies of the Senegalese clubs Gesfoot and Génération Foot. On 7 July 2023, he moved to the Challenger Pro League club RFC Seraing. On 28 July 2024, he transferred to the French club Metz. On 29 August 2024, he returned to RFC Seraing on a season-long loan. On 24 July 2025, he joined RAAL La Louvière on a season-long loan in the Belgian Pro League. He scored 12 goals in 29 games to help RAAL La Louvière stay in the first division in the 2025–26 season.

== International career ==
Fall was one of the players who were called up with the Senegal national team by head coach Patrick Vieira for the 2027 Africa Cup of Nations qualification matches against Mozambique and Ethiopia on 25 and 29 September 2026, respectively; and the friendly match against Comoros on 4 October 2026.
