= Jaden Heskey =

English footballer (born 2005)

- Heskey with Manchester City in 2024

Personal information
- Full name: Jaden Emile Tyrone Heskey
- Date of birth: 17 December 2005 (age 20)
- Place of birth: Manchester, England
- Height: 5 ft 11 in (1.80 m)
- Position: Attacking midfielder

Team information
- Current team: Sheffield Wednesday (on loan from Manchester City)
- Number: 18

Youth career
- 2013–2025: Manchester City

Senior career*
Years	Team	Apps	(Gls)
2025–	Manchester City	0	(0)
2026	→ Sheffield Wednesday (loan)	20	(0)
2026–	→ Sheffield Wednesday (loan)	10	(0)
- * Club domestic league appearances and goals as of 22:00, 20 November 2026 (UTC)

Jaden Emile Tyrone Heskey (born 17 December 2005) is an English professional footballer who plays as an attacking midfielder for EFL League One club Sheffield Wednesday on loan from Premier League club Manchester City.

== Early life and career ==
Jaden Emile Tyrone Heskey was born on 17 December 2005 in Manchester. He joined the academy at Manchester City aged eight. After progressing through the age-groups he captained the club at U18 level. He signed scholarship terms with the club shortly after turning sixteen years-old in 2021, and his first professional contract with Manchester City in July 2023. In November 2023, he appeared in the UEFA Youth League alongside his brother Reigan Heskey. In May 2024, he scored in the final as Man City beat Leeds United to win the FA Youth Cup. On 24 September 2025, both Heskey and his brother Reigan made their senior debuts for City in a 2–0 away victory over EFL League One side Huddersfield Town in the EFL Cup third round.

On 16 January 2026, Heskey joined Championship club Sheffield Wednesday on loan until the end of the season. He made his Wednesday debut the following day, coming off the bench against Portsmouth. He made his first senior start the following game against Birmingham City, playing the full 90 minutes.

On 1 September 2026, Heskey rejoined Sheffield Wednesday on loan until the end of the 2026–27 season. He made his second debut the same day, coming off the bench against Wycombe Wanderers. His first senior goal came against Sunderland U21 in the EFL Trophy, putting Wednesday ahead with a dink over the keeper from close range.

== Personal life ==
He is the son of former England striker Emile Heskey and wife Chantelle. His brother Reigan Heskey plays for Köln. He is of Antiguan descent through his father.

== Career statistics ==
As of 20 November 2026

Appearances and goals by club, season and competition
Club	Season	League			FA Cup		EFL Cup		Continental		Other		Total	
Club	Season	Division	Apps	Goals	Apps	Goals	Apps	Goals	Apps	Goals	Apps	Goals	Apps	Goals
Manchester City U21	2023–24	—			—		—		—		3 (Note: Appearance(s) in EFL Trophy)	0	3	0
Manchester City U21	2024–25	—			—		—		—		3	0	3	0
Manchester City U21	2025–26	—			—		—		—		2	0	2	0
Manchester City U21	Total		—		—		—		—		8	0	8	0
Manchester City	2025–26	Premier League	0	0	0	0	1	0	0	0	—		1	0
Manchester City	2026–27	Premier League	0	0	0	0	0	0	0	0	—		0	0
Manchester City	Total		0	0	0	0	1	0	0	0	0	0	1	0
Sheffield Wednesday (loan)	2025–26	Championship	20	0	—		—		—		—		20	0
Sheffield Wednesday (loan)	2026–27	League One	10	0	1	0	—		—		2	1	13	1
Sheffield Wednesday (loan)	Total		30	0	1	0	—		—		2	1	33	1
Career Total			30	0	1	0	1	0	0	0	10	1	42	1
