= 2013–14 Watford F.C. season =

English football team season

Watford
2013–14 season
- Chairman: Raffaele Riva
- Head coach: Gianfranco Zola (until 16 December 2013); Giuseppe Sannino (from 18 December 2013)
- Stadium: Vicarage Road
- Football League Championship: 13th (60 points)
- FA Cup: Fourth round (eliminated by Manchester City)
- League Cup: Third round (eliminated by Norwich City)
- Top goalscorer: League: Troy Deeney (24); All: Troy Deeney (25)
- Highest home attendance: 16,625 v Queens Park Rangers, 29 December 2013
- Lowest home attendance: 9,824 v Bournemouth, League Cup second round, 28 August 2013
- Average home league attendance: 15,512
Home colours	Away colours

Watford Football Club is an English football club from Watford, Hertfordshire. They played in the 2013–14 Football League Championship, for the seventh consecutive season since relegation from the Premier League in 2006–07. The manager was Giuseppe Sannino.

== Background ==
Gianfranco Zola replaced Sean Dyche as Watford manager at the end of the 2011–12 season following Sean Dyche's dismissal. Following the takeover of Watford by the Pozzo family, Watford loaned a significant number of players on season-long deals from fellow Pozzo-owned clubs Udinese and Granada. The use of a large number of loan players drew criticism from fellow managers, who argued that a large number of loan players from a few clubs should not be allowed. However, despite the number of loanees at the club, Watford used the second-most academy players after Middlesbrough, using eight different academy players throughout the season.

== Pre-season ==
Watford attended a pre-season training camp in northern Italy and played friendly fixtures before playing more fixtures in the UK

7 July 2013	Val Venosta XI	0–5	Watford	Malser Sportzone
16:00		Report	Forestieri; Pudil; Deeney; Stewart; Assombalonga

10 July 2013	South Tyrol XI	0–8	Watford	Malser Sportzone
17:00			Faraoni; Murray; Assombalonga; Mensah; Anya

20 July 2013	Stevenage	0–2	Watford	Broadhall Way
15:00		Report	Acuña 52'; Troy Deeney 58'

24 July 2013	Peterborough United	1–1	Watford	London Road
19.30	Swanson 58'		Deeney 60'

27 July 2013	Watford	2–0	Granada	Vicarage Road
15.00	Fabbrini 38'; Anya 77'	Report		Attendance: 4,963

30 July 2013	Boreham Wood	1–6	Watford	Meadow Park
19.30	Simmonds 4'	Report	Mensah 9'; Ikpeazu 24', 34'; Battocchio 55'; Geijo 58', 88'	Attendance: 718

== Football League Championship ==
3 August 2013 1	Birmingham City	0–1	Watford	St Andrew's, Birmingham
15:00		Report	Deeney 11'	Attendance: 18,830

10 August 2013 2	Watford	6–1	Bournemouth	Vicarage Road, Watford
15:00	Angella 13', 53'; Deeney 56', 88', 90' (pen.); McGugan 66'	Report	Grabban 30'	Attendance: 16,295

17 August 2013 3	Reading	3–3	Watford	Madejski Stadium, Reading
15:00	Le Fondre 8'; Karacan 42', 70'	Report	Faraoni 66'; Deeney 76' (pen.); Fabbrini 90'	Attendance: 20,875

25 August 2013 4	Watford	1–1	Nottingham Forest	Vicarage Road, Watford
13:15	McGugan 54'	Report	Reid 6'	Attendance: 16,242

31 August 2013 5	Blackpool	1–0	Watford	Bloomfield Road, Blackpool
15:00	Ince 83'	Report		Attendance: 13,345

14 September 2013 6	Watford	1–1	Charlton Athletic	Vicarage Road, Watford
15:00	Pudil 71'	Report	Kermorgant 47' (pen.)	Attendance: 16,431

17 September 2013 7	Watford	2–1	Doncaster Rovers	Vicarage Road, Watford
19:45	McGugan 13', 87' (pen.)	Report	Brown 16'	Attendance: 13,998

21 September 2013 8	Barnsley	1–5	Watford	Oakwell, Barnsley
15:00	Scotland 14'	Report	Deeney 7'; Faraoni 18'; Forestieri 43'; Murray 69'; Anya 79'	Attendance: 9,850

28 September 2013 9	Watford	1–0	Wigan Athletic	Vicarage Road, Watford
15:00	Battocchio 82'	Report		Attendance: 14,999

1 October 2013 10	Blackburn Rovers	1–0	Watford	Ewood Park, Blackburn
19:45	Rhodes 65'	Report		Attendance: 12,981

5 October 2013 11	Huddersfield Town	1–2	Watford	John Smith's Stadium, Huddersfield
15:00	Ward 17'	Report	Forestieri 18'; Pudil 43'	Attendance: 14,311

19 October 2013 12	Watford	2-3	Derby County	Vicarage Road, Watford
15:00	Forestieri 12'; McGugan 68'	Report	Ward 8'; Ward 45'; Sammon 8'	Attendance: 16,180

28 October 2013 13	Brighton & Hove Albion	1–1	Watford	Falmer Stadium, Brighton
20:00	Crofts 54'	Report	4' Murray	Attendance: 27,657

2 November 2013 14	Watford	0–3	Leicester City	Vicarage Road, Watford
12:15	Forestieri (yellow card) 36'; Ekstrand (yellow card) 77'	Report	Wood 10'; Knockaert 53', (yellow card) 53'; Dyer 86'	Attendance: 16,011 (1,561 away)

9 November 2013 15	Middlesbrough	2–2	Watford	Riverside Stadium, Middlesbrough
15:00	Adomah 23'; Ayala 90+2'	Report	Deeney 32'; Forestieri 73'	Attendance: 14,344

23 November 2013 16	Watford	0–1	Bolton Wanderers	Vicarage Road, Watford
15:00		Report	Beckford 27'	Attendance: 15,247

30 November 2013 17	Watford	0–3	Yeovil Town	Vicarage Road, Watford
15:00		Report	Webster 45'; Miller 53'; Edwards 90'	Attendance: 15,263

3 December 2013 18	Burnley	0–0	Watford	Turf Moor, Burnley
19:45		Report

7 December 2013 19	Leeds United	3–3	Watford	Elland Road, Leeds
15:00	Pugh 50'; Smith 56'; McCormack 78'	Report	Deeney 14', 86'; Battocchio 45+1'	Attendance: 23,445

14 December 2013 20	Watford	0–1	Sheffield Wednesday	Vicarage Road, Watford
15:00		Report	Wickham 24', (yellow card) 70'; Roger Johnson (yellow card) 32'; Lee (yellow card) 67'; Hélan (yellow card) 83'	Attendance: 15,476

21 December 2013 21	Ipswich Town	1–1	Watford	Portman Road, Ipswich
15:00	Smith (yellow card) 12'; McGoldrick 73' (pen.)	Report	Pudil (yellow card) 60'; Ekstrand (yellow card) 72'; Thorne (yellow card) 77'; Deeney 81'	Attendance: 16,385

26 December 2013 22	Watford	4–0	Millwall	Vicarage Road, Watford
15:00	Deeney 10' (pen.); Forestieri 26'; Anya 48'; McGugan 60' (pen.)	Report		Attendance: 15,471

29 December 2013 23	Watford	0–0	Queens Park Rangers	Vicarage Road, Watford
15:00	Angella (yellow card) 39'; Acuña (yellow card) 81'	Report	Phillips (yellow card) 62'; Barton (yellow card) 66'	Attendance: 16,625; Referee: Neil Swarbrick

1 January 2014	Yeovil Town	P–P	Watford	Huish Park, Yeovil
15:00		Postponed due to waterlogged pitch

11 January 2014 24	Watford	0–1	Reading	Vicarage Road, Watford
15:00		Report	Gorkšs 5'

18 January 2014 25	Bournemouth	1–1	Watford	Dean Court, Bournemouth
15:00	Ritchie (yellow card) 12'; Grabban 62' (pen.); Pitman (yellow card) 81'	Report	Angella 45+2', (red card) 61'; Almunia (yellow card) 72'	Attendance: 10,353

25 January 2014 Game postponed (FA Cup)	Watford	P–P	Birmingham City	Vicarage Road, Watford
15:00

30 January 2014 26	Nottingham Forest	4–2	Watford	City Ground, Nottingham
19:45	Cox 58', 90', (yellow card) 90+1'; Henderson 73'; Mackie 82'	Report	33', 47', (yellow card) 42', Angella; (yellow card) 36' Ekstrand; (yellow card) 80' Cassetti	Attendance: 18,510

1 February 2014 27	Watford	2–0	Brighton & Hove Albion	Vicarage Road, Watford
15:00	Anya 13'; Forestieri 60'; Tőzsér (yellow card) 70'; Ekstrand (yellow card) 90+5'	Report	Greer (yellow card) 79'	Attendance: 16,096

8 February 2014 28	Leicester City	2–2	Watford	King Power Stadium, Leicester
15:00	Konchesky (yellow card) 24'; James 43'; Drinkwater 90+4'	Report	Forestieri 9', (yellow card) 84'; Tőzsér (yellow card) 22'; Murray 41'; Cassetti (yellow card) 74'	Attendance: 23,635

11 February 2014 29	Watford	1–0	Birmingham City	Vicarage Road, Watford
15:00	Deeney 33'; Bellerín (yellow card) 84'; Forestieri (yellow card) 90+4'	Report		Attendance: 13,904

15 February 2014 30	Watford	1–0	Middlesbrough	Vicarage Road, Watford
15:00	Cassetti (yellow card) 37'; Deeney 50' (pen.); Diakité (red card) 52'; Forestieri (yellow card) 58'	Report	Gibson (yellow card) 35' (yellow-red card) 57'; Chalobah (yellow card) 58'	Attendance: 15,391

18 February 2014 31	Yeovil Town	0–0	Watford	Huish Park, Yeovil
15:00	Webster (yellow card) 71'; Miller (yellow card) 90'	Report	Cassetti (yellow card) 83'	Attendance: 6,042

22 February 2014 32	Bolton Wanderers	2–0	Watford	Reebok Stadium, Bolton
15:00	Medo (yellow card) 26'; Jutkiewicz 35'; Mason 45'	Report	Ekstrand (yellow card) 56'; Angella (yellow card) 90+2'; Faraoni (yellow card) 90+6'	Attendance: 15,179

1 March 2014 33	Watford	4–0	Blackpool	Vicarage Road, Watford
15:00	Ranégie 15', 39'; Deeney 35', 74'; Belkalem (yellow card) 79'	Report	Basham (yellow card) 45'	Attendance: 14,586

8 March 2014 Game postponed (FA Cup)	Charlton Athletic	P–P	Watford	The Valley, Charlton, London
15:00

11 March 2014 34	Doncaster Rovers	2–1	Watford	Keepmoat Stadium, Doncaster
19:45	Brown 24'; Keegan (yellow card) 71'; Coppinger (yellow card) 90'; Sharp 90+3'; Wellens (yellow card) 90+4'	Report	Ranégie (red card) 19'; Angella (yellow card) 30'; Cassetti (yellow card) 49'; Tőzsér (yellow card) 62'; Anya 68'; Faraoni (yellow card) 90+5'	Attendance: 6,581

15 March 2014 35	Watford	3–0	Barnsley	Vicarage Road, Watford
15:00	Battocchio 5'; Deeney 16'; Pudil (yellow card) 36'; Merkel 74'	Report	Dawson (yellow card) 28'; Mellis (yellow card) 55'	Attendance: 14,531

22 March 2014 36	Wigan Athletic	2–1	Watford	DW Stadium, Wigan
15:00	Beausejour 40'; Waghorn 57', (yellow card) 60'	Report	McGugan 36'; Tőzsér (yellow card) 58'; Diakité (yellow card) 83'; Ekstrand (yellow card) 89'	Attendance: 14,556

25 March 2014 37	Watford	3–3	Blackburn Rovers	Vicarage Road, Watford
19:45	Cassetti 4'; Deeney 71' (pen.); Battocchio 88'; Angella (yellow card) 76'	Report	Dunn 27'; Conway 64'; Gestede 90+3'; Evans (yellow card) 78'; Kane (yellow card) 85'; Kilgallon (yellow card) 90'	Attendance: 13,921

29 March 2014 38	Sheffield Wednesday	1–4	Watford	Hillsborough, Sheffield
15:00	Afobe 54'; Lee (yellow card) 71'	Report	Angella 5', (yellow card) 38'; McGugan 23'; Pudil (yellow card) 42'; Deeney 49', 51'; Tőzsér (yellow card) 56'	Attendance: 22,057

5 April 2014 39	Watford	1–1	Burnley	Vicarage Road, Watford
15:00	Deeney 8'; Faraoni (yellow card) 88'	Report	Arfield 86'	Attendance: 16,182

8 April 2014 40	Watford	3–0	Leeds United	Vicarage Road, Watford
19:45	Abdi 9'; Cassetti (yellow card) 28'; Anya 32'; Deeney 66'	Report	Wootton (yellow card) 49'; Hunt (yellow card) 61'	Attendance: 16,212

12 April 2014 41	Millwall	2–2	Watford	The Den, South Bermondsey, London
15:07	Martin (yellow card) 26'; Morison 64'; Woolford 90', (yellow card) 90'	Report	Riera (yellow card) 4'; McGugan 17', (yellow card) 37'; Abdi 86'; Murray (yellow card) 84'	Attendance: 10,851

19 April 2014 42	Watford	3–1	Ipswich Town	Vicarage Road, Watford
15:00	Riera 21'; Angella (yellow card) 60', (goal) 63'; McGugan 65', (yellow card) 70'; Tőzsér (yellow card) 83'	Report	Wordsworth 50'	Attendance: 16,615

21 April 2014 43	Queens Park Rangers	2–1	Watford	Loftus Road, Shepherd's Bush, London
15:00	Barton 76'; Austin (yellow card) 86', (goal) 90'	Report	Ranégie 51', (yellow card) 58'; Riera (yellow card) 55'; Abdi (yellow card) 60'	Attendance: 16,951

26 April 2014 44	Derby County	4–2	Watford	Pride Park, Derby
15:00	Hendrick 28', 81'; Forsyth 60'; Martin 86'	Report	Cassetti (yellow card) 4' (yellow-red card) 68'; Deeney 5', (yellow card) 90'; Riera (yellow card) 22'; Tőzsér (yellow card) 51'; Ranégie 70'	Attendance: 25,922

29 April 2014 45	Charlton Athletic	3–1	Watford	The Valley, Charlton, London
19:45	Harriott 22', 77'; Jackson 69'; Hughes (yellow card) 90'	Report	Belkalem (yellow card) 45'; Deeney 60'; Riera (yellow card) 65' (yellow-red card) 79'; Ranégie (yellow card) 84'	Attendance: 15,815

3 May 2014 46	Watford	1–4	Huddersfield Town	Vicarage Road, Watford
15:00	Hoban (yellow card) 42'; Tőzsér (yellow card) 64'; Angella (yellow card) 83'; Deeney 90+3' (pen.)	Report	Deeney 5'; Ranégie 70'	Attendance: 15,370

== Football League Cup ==
6 August 2013 Round 1	Bristol Rovers	1–3	Watford	Memorial Ground
19:45	Richards 41'	Report	Murray 19', 35'; Angella 30'	Attendance: 4,875

28 August 2013 Round 2	Watford	2–0	Bournemouth	Vicarage Road
19:45	Ward 15' (o.g.); Battocchio 66'	Report		Attendance: 9,824

24 September 2013 Round 3	Watford	2–3 (a.e.t.)	Norwich City	Vicarage Road
19:45	Acuna 23'; Faraoni 55'	Report	Murphy 77'; Hooper 90', 115'	Attendance: 11,178

== FA Cup ==
4 January 2014 Round 3	Bristol City	1–1	Watford	Ashton Gate, Bristol
15:00	Emmanuel-Thomas 84'	Report	Murray 83'	Attendance: 10,165

14 January 2014 Round 3 replay	Watford	2–0	Bristol City	Vicarage Road, Watford
19:45	Faraoni 29'; McGugan 64'	Report		Attendance: 7,302

25 January 2014 Round 4	Manchester City	4–2	Watford	City of Manchester Stadium, Manchester
15:00	Džeko (yellow card) 10'; Agüero 60', 79', 90+2'; Kolarov 87'	Report	Forestieri 21'; Deeney 30'; Pudil (yellow card) 48'; Cassetti (yellow card) 82'	Attendance: 46,514

== League table ==
Pos	Team	Pld	W	D	L	GF	GA	GD	Pts
11	Nottingham Forest	46	16	17	13	67	64	+3	65
12	Middlesbrough	46	16	16	14	62	50	+12	64
13	Watford	46	15	15	16	74	64	+10	60
14	Bolton Wanderers	46	14	17	15	59	60	−1	59
15	Leeds United	46	16	9	21	59	67	−8	57

Source: BBC Sport
Rules for classification: 1) points; 2) goal difference; 3) number of goals scored

== Summary ==
Round	1	2	3	4	5	6	7	8	9	10	11	12	13	14	15	16	17	18	19	20	21	22	23	24	25	26	27	28	29	30	31	32	33	34	35	36	37	38	39	40	41	42	43	44	45	46
Ground	A	H	A	H	A	H	H	A	H	A	A	H	A	H	A	H	H	A	A	H	A	H	H	H	A	A	H	A	H	H	A	A	H	A	H	A	H	H	A	H	H	A	H	A	A	H
Result	W	W	D	D	L	D	W	W	W	L	W	L	D	L	D	L	L	D	D	L	D	W	D	L	D	L	W	D	W	W	D	L	W	L	W	L	D	W	D	W	D	W	L	L	L	L
Position	9	1	2	5	7	8	6	5	4	7	5	7	7	7	7	10	10	12	12	13	14	12	13	15	15	16	13	14	13	12	11	12	11	11	11	12	12	11	12	12	13	12	12	13	13	13

Updated to match(es) played on 3 May 2014. Source: BBC Sport
A = Away; H = Home; W = Win; D = Draw; L = Loss

== Players ==
=== Statistics ===
No. = Squad number

Pos = Playing position

P = Number of games played

G = Number of goals scored

= Yellow cards

GK = Goalkeeper

DF = Defender

MF = Midfielder

FW = Forward

= Red cards

Yth = Whether player went through Watford's youth system

Joined club = Year that player became a Watford first team player (Note: For players who came through the club's youth system the date used refers to when they signed a professional contract, unless they appeared in a first-team match-day squad prior to that, in which case that date is used.)

Age = Current age

Left club during 2013–14

† Loan player

Statistics correct as of game played 3 May 2014.
Numbers in brackets indicate substitute appearances

2013–14 Watford player details (Note: All players who have been signed to the club since the opening day of the 2013–14 season are listed)
No.	Pos	Name	P	G	P	G	P	G	P	G	Yellow cards	Red cards	Age	Joined club	Yth	Notes
No.	Pos	Name	Championship		FA Cup		League Cup		Total		Discipline		Age	Joined club	Yth	Notes
1	GK	Manuel Almunia	37	0	1	0	0	0	38	0	1	0	36	2012	No	—
2	DF	Reece Brown	0 (1)	0	0	0	2	0	2 (1)	0	0	0	22	2013	No	—
3	DF	Héctor Bellerín	6 (2)	0	0	0	0	0	6 (2)	0	1	0	19	2013	No	†
4	DF	Gabriele Angella	39 (1)	7	3	0	1 (1)	1	43 (2)	8	11	1	25	2013	No	—
5	DF	Essaïd Belkalem	5 (3)	0	0	0	2	0	7 (3)	0	4	0	25	2013	No	†
6	DF	Joel Ekstrand	31 (2)	0	3	0	3	0	37 (2)	0	11	0	25	2012	No	—
7	MF	Cristian Battocchio	21 (14)	4	3	0	3	1	27 (14)	5	2	0	22	2012	No	—
8	MF	Josh McEachran	5 (2)	0	0	0	1	0	6 (2)	0	0	0	21	2013	No	†
8	MF	Alexander Merkel	7 (4)	1	0	0	0	0	7 (4)	1	1	1	21	2014	No	†
9	FW	Troy Deeney	44	24	3	1	0 (1)	0	47 (1)	25	4	0	25	2010	No	—
10	MF	Lewis McGugan	31 (3)	10	2	0	0 (1)	0	33 (4)	11	7	0	25	2013	No	—
11	FW	Fernando Forestieri	19 (9)	7	2	1	1 (1)	0	22 (10)	8	8	0	24	2012	No	—
12	DF	Lloyd Doyley	23 (1)	0	1	0	0 (1)	0	24 (2)	0	1	0	31	2001	Yes	—
13	FW	Mathias Ranégie	8 (2)	4	0	0	0	0	8 (2)	4	2	1	29	2014	No	—
15	FW	Javier Acuña	3 (6)	0	0	0	3	1	6 (6)	1	2	0	25	2013	No	—
15	MF	Albert Riera	6 (2)	1	0	0	0	0	6 (2)	1	3	1	32	2014	No	—
16	MF	Sean Murray	22 (12)	3	2	1	3	2	27 (12)	6	2	0	19	2010	Yes	—
17	DF	Fitz Hall	3 (2)	0	1	0	0	0	4 (2)	0	0	0	33	2013	No	—
18	DF	Daniel Pudil	29 (8)	2	1 (1)	0	3	0	33 (9)	2	7	0	28	2012	No	—
19	DF	Marco Faraoni	26 (12)	2	1	0	3	1	31 (12)	4	9	0	22	2013	No	—
20	FW	Diego Fabbrini	8 (13)	1	1 (1)	0	2	0	11 (14)	1	2	0	23	2013	No	—
20	FW	Park Chu-young	1 (1)	0	0	0	0	0	1 (1)	0	0	0	26	2014	No	†
21	MF	Ikechi Anya	29 (6)	5	2	0	0 (1)	0	31 (7)	5	0	0	26	2012	No	—
22	MF	Almen Abdi	9 (4)	2	0 (2)	0	0 (1)	0	9 (7)	2	2	0	27	2012	No	—
23	MF	Iriney	12 (3)	0	2	0	0	0	14 (3)	0	4	0	33	2013	No	—
23	MF	Samba Diakité	1 (5)	0	0	0	0	0	1 (5)	0	1	1	25	2014	No	†
25	FW	Uche Ikpeazu	0	0	0	0	0	0	0	0	0	0	19	2013	No	—
26	FW	Bernard Mensah	0 (1)	0	0	0	0	0	0	0	0	0	19	2011	Yes	—
27	DF	Marco Cassetti	32 (3)	1	1 (1)	0	1 (1)	0	34 (5)	1	10	1	36	2012	No	—
28	MF	Connor Smith	1	0	0 (1)	0	2 (1)	0	3 (2)	0	1	0	21	2011	Yes	—
28	MF	Dániel Tőzsér	20	0	0	0	0	0	20	0	8	0	28	2014	Yes	†
29	MF	George Thorne	8	0	0	0	0	0	8	0	1	0	21	2013	No	†
29	DF	Lucas Neill	0 (1)	0	0	0	0	0	0 (1)	0	0	0	36	2014	No	-
30	GK	Jonathan Bond	9 (1)	0	2	0	3	0	14 (1)	0	0	0	20	2010	Yes	—
31	DF	Tommie Hoban	5 (2)	0	0	0	0	0	5 (2)	0	1	0	20	2011	Yes	—
32	MF	Luke O'Nien	0 (1)	0	0	0	0	0	0 (1)	0	0	0	19	2013	Yes	—
33	DF	Nyron Nosworthy	5	0	1	0	0	0	6	0	1	0	33	2011	No	—
36	FW	Alex Jakubiak	1	0	0	0	0	0	1	0	0	0	17	2010	Yes	—
37	DF	Josh Doherty	0 (1)	0	0	0	0	0	0 (1)	0	0	0	18	2012	Yes	—
—	MF	Ross Jenkins	0	0	0	0	0	0	0	0	0	0	22	2008	Yes	—
—	DF	Adam Thompson	0	0	0	0	0	0	0	0	0	0	20	2010	Yes	—

=== Transfers ===
==== In ====
Date	Player	From	Fee
1 July 2013	Uche Ikpeazu	Reading	Free
2 July 2013	Lewis McGugan	Nottingham Forest	Free
19 July 2013	Daniel Pudil	Granada	Free
19 July 2013	Marco Cassetti	Udinese	Free
19 July 2013	Cristian Battocchio	Udinese	Free
19 July 2013	Almen Abdi	Udinese	Free
19 July 2013	Diego Fabbrini	Udinese	Free
19 July 2013	Gabriele Angella	Udinese	Free
19 July 2013	Javier Acuña	Udinese	Free
19 July 2013	Marco Faraoni	Udinese	Free
22 July 2013	Ikechi Anya	Granada	Free
22 July 2013	Reece Brown	Manchester United	Free
24 July 2013	Joel Ekstrand	Udinese	Free
25 July 2013	Iriney	Granada	Free
3 January 2014	Mathias Ranegie	Udinese	Free
24 February 2014	Lucas Neill	Unattached	Free

==== Out ====
At the end of the 2012–13 season, the club announced that seven players would be released at the end of their contracts, alongside Chris Iwelumo, who had already agreed to join Scunthorpe United. After being released by the club, Jack Bonham signed for Brentford, Stephen McGinn signed for Sheffield United and Mark Yeates signed for Bradford City.

Date	Player	To	Fee
3 June 2013	Chris Iwelumo	Scunthorpe United	Free
7 June 2013	Jack Bonham	Brentford	Free
7 June 2013	Mark Yeates	Bradford City	Released
7 June 2013	Prince Buaben	-	Released
7 June 2013	Stephen McGinn	Sheffield United	Free
7 June 2013	Piero Mingoia	Accrington Stanley	Released
7 June 2013	Aaron Tumwa	-	Released
7 June 2013	Stephan Hamilton-Forbes	-	Released
1 July 2013	Craig Forsyth	Derby County	Undisclosed
2 July 2013	John Eustace	Derby County	Free
20 July 2013	Lee Hodson	Milton Keynes Dons	Free
24 July 2013	Carl Dickinson	Port Vale	Mutual Termination
29 July 2013	Jonathan Hogg	Huddersfield Town	£400k
31 July 2013	Britt Assombalonga	Peterborough United	£1.3M
9 January 2014	Adam Thompson	Southend United	Undisclosed

=== Loans ===
==== In ====
Start	Player	Parent club	End
12 August 2013	Essaïd Belkalem	Granada	30 June 2014
20 September 2013	Josh McEachran	Chelsea	2 January 2014
6 November 2013	George Thorne	West Bromwich Albion	2 January 2014
22 November 2013	Héctor Bellerín	Arsenal	18 February 2014
3 January 2014	Alexander Merkel	Udinese	30 June 2014
29 January 2014	Dániel Tőzsér	Genoa	30 June 2014
31 January 2014	Samba Diakité	QPR	30 June 2014
31 January 2014	Park Chu-young	Arsenal	30 June 2014

==== Out ====
Start	Player	To	Loan End Date
9 August 2013	Adam Thompson	Southend United	4 January 2014
8 January 2014	Connor Smith	Gillingham	End of season
11 January 2014	Javier Acuña	Osasuna	End of season
13 January 2014	Uche Ikpeazu	Crewe Alexandra	End of season
31 January 2014	Diego Fabbrini	Siena	End of season
31 January 2014	Iriney	Mallorca	End of season
14 March 2014	Nyron Nosworthy	Bristol City	End of season
26 March 2014	Lucas Neill	Doncaster Rovers	End of season
11 March 2014	Reece Brown	Carlisle United	End of season

=== International ===
On 14 August 2013, Cristian Battocchio made his Italian Under-21 debut in a 4–1 friendly win over Slovakia.

Country	Team	Player
Algeria	Senior	Essaïd Belkalem
Scotland	Senior	Ikechi Anya
England	Under-21	Jonathan Bond
Italy	Under-21	Christian Battocchio
Northern Ireland	Under-21	Adam Thompson
Republic of Ireland	Under-21	Sean Murray
Republic of Ireland	Under-21	Connor Smith

== Coaching staff ==
Role	Name
Head coach	Giuseppe Sannino
Assistant coach	Adolfo Sormani
Assistant coach	Bastiano Porcu
Goalkeeping coach	Alec Chamberlain
Youth (U-18) Coach	David Hughes
Chief scout	Filippo Giraldi
Scouting Co-Ordinator	Luke Warrington
Head of Medical	Marco Cesarini
Kit Manager	Will Jones
Head of sports science	Gianni Brignardello
Sports scientist	Ben Dixon
