= 2012–13 Watford F.C. season =

English football team season

Watford F.C.
2012–13 season
- Chairman: Raffaele Riva
- Head coach: Gianfranco Zola
- Stadium: Vicarage Road
- Championship: 3rd (77 points)
- Play-offs: Runners-up
- FA Cup: Third round (eliminated by Manchester City)
- League Cup: Second round (eliminated by Bradford City)
Home colours	Away colours

Watford Football Club is a football club from Watford, Hertfordshire, England. The club played in the 2012–13 Football League Championship for the sixth consecutive season since relegation from the Premier League in 2006–07. The club also competed in the FA Cup and the Football League Cup.

Despite guiding the club to an 11th-placed finish in 2009–10, the club's 3rd highest points tally for 9 years, manager Sean Dyche was dismissed and replaced by Gianfranco Zola following the club's takeover by Udinese and Granada owner Giampaolo Pozzo. The club captain was central midfielder John Eustace, although due to injury, Goalkeeper Manuel Almunia was captain for the majority of the season. During the summer transfer window, the club sold two key first team players; academy graduate Adrian Mariappa and goalkeeper Scott Loach. To replace them, Watford brought in two experienced players in Manuel Almunia and Fitz Hall. All other incoming transfers were loan players, mainly from Udinese and Granada. Zola later revealed that the club only loaned the players due to the short time scale between the completion of the take over and the transfer deadline day.

Watford had a relatively poor start to the season, losing 7 of their first 13 games, including a heavy 5–1 loss to Derby County F.C. In the subsequent months however, Watford began to win more matches and started to climb the table, rising to hold the 6th position by the end of 2012. Towards the end of the season, Watford were in contention for an automatic promotion spot together with Hull. On a dramatic final day of the regular season, Hull failed to guarantee their automatic promotion by only drawing to league champions Cardiff, however Watford were unable to capitalise against Leeds and finished the season in 3rd place, entering the play-offs. Over two games, Watford beat Leicester City on aggregate in a dramatic semi-final that saw them face Crystal Palace in the play-off final at Wembley where Crystal Palace won and sealed promotion to the Premier League.

== Background ==
Sean Dyche replaced Malky Mackay as Watford manager at the end of the 2010–11 season. Following the departures of Mackay, Danny Graham, Will Buckley and Don Cowie, Watford were tipped for relegation in 2011–12 by some bookmakers and media organisations. However, Watford finished the season in 11th place with 64 points; Watford's third highest points tally since the departure of Graham Taylor as manager in 2001. At the end of the season, it was confirmed that Rene Gilmartin, Michael Bryan, Josh Walker, Chez Isaac and Tom James would be released – their contracts expired at the end of the 2011–12 season. Former manager Graham Taylor stepped down as chairman shortly before UEFA Euro 2012, indicating that he felt the timing was right and that he was keen to pursue other interests.

== Takeover ==
In June 2012, Laurence Bassini indicated that he was looking to sell the club. Amid reports that the club's bondholders had called in the debt due to an act of default, Bassini stressed that the decision to sell was his alone, motivated by a wish to spend more time with his family. A company owned by Giampaolo Pozzo and his family completed the takeover of Watford on 29 June 2012. The management structure of the club changed significantly in the following weeks, with Rafaelle Riva appointed chairman. Former West Ham United chief executive Scott Duxbury and technical director Gianluca Nani took up similar roles with Watford, while ex-West Ham manager Gianfranco Zola replaced Sean Dyche. The club also stated an intention to make use of the Pozzo family's scouting network, which identifies players for Udinese in Serie A and Granada in La Liga.

== Preseason ==
Watford did not make any signings prior to the start of their pre-season campaign, but their first two games against local featured triallists Daniel Pudil and Almen Abdi. In both matches – away to Boreham Wood and Wealdstone – Watford changed all eleven players at half time. Both games finished as 1–1 draws. The team's first win of pre-season came in a visit to Irish side Cork City, and was followed by an 8–0 win in a match against Barnet at Watford's training ground in London Colney.

Watford's only pre-season game at Vicarage Road was a testimonial match for defender Lloyd Doyley, who started his professional career at the club in 2001. Before the start of the game, Doyley entered the pitch to a guard of honour, and when he was substituted with 15 minutes remaining he was given a standing ovation by supporters. However, a goal from Tottenham's Jermain Defoe gave the visitors a 1–0 victory. Watford finished their pre-season schedule with a 3–0 win at Gillingham, with two goals from Matěj Vydra and one from Piero Mingoia.

17 July 2012	Boreham Wood	1–1	Watford	Meadow Park
19:30	Hutton 12'		Mingoia 7'

21 July 2012	Wealdstone	1–1	Watford	Grosvenor Vale
15:00	Parker 77'		Yeates 13'	Attendance: 1,335

24 July 2012	Cork City	0–2	Watford	Turners Cross
19:45			Garner 16'; Mingoia 87'	Attendance: 1,182

1 August 2012	Watford	8–0	Barnet	UCL Sports Ground
15:00	Hogg; Garner; Nosworthy; Abdi; Yeates; Murray; Iwelumo

5 August 2012	Watford	0–1	Tottenham Hotspur	Vicarage Road
15:00			Defoe 55'	Attendance: 9,218

7 August 2012	Gillingham	0–3	Watford	Priestfield Stadium
19:30			Vydra 12', 15'; Mingoia 29'

== Championship ==
18 August 2012 1	Crystal Palace	2−3	Watford	Selhurst Park
15:00	Garvan 13' (pen.), 29'		Taylor 22'; Abdi 88'; Vydra 90'	Attendance: 17,109

21 August 2012 2	Watford	0−1	Ipswich Town	Vicarage Road
19:45			Chopra	Attendance: 12,422

25 August 2012 3	Watford	2−0	Birmingham City	Vicarage Road
17:20	Abdi 4' (pen.); Vydra 17'			Attendance: 11,022

1 September 2012 4	Derby County	5−1	Watford	Pride Park
15:00	Keogh 16'; Hendrick 36'; Sammon 43'; Hughes 52'; Ward 67'		71' Vydra	Attendance: 20,608

15 September 2012 5	Bolton Wanderers	2−1	Watford	Reebok Stadium
15:00	Mills 3'; Davies 42'		58' Doyley	Attendance: 16,608

18 September 2012 6	Watford	0−1	Brighton & Hove Albion	Vicarage Road
19:45		Report	Mackail-Smith 50' (pen.)	Attendance: 11,894

22 September 2012 7	Watford	2−2	Bristol City	Vicarage Road
15:00	Wilson 59' (o.g.); Vydra 72'	Report	63' Elliott; 83' Davies	Attendance: 11,886

29 September 2012 8	Huddersfield Town	2−3	Watford	John Smith's Stadium
15:00	Norwood 25'; Lee 84'		Forestieri 68'; Hall 83'; Deeney 87' (pen.)	Attendance: 14,564

2 October 2012 9	Charlton Athletic	1−2	Watford	The Valley
19:45	Fuller 35'	Report	Hoban 29'; Abdi 70'	Attendance: 15,585

6 October 2012 10	Watford	1−2	Middlesbrough	Vicarage Road
15:00	Deeney 1'	Report	Emnes 30'; McDonald 77'	Attendance: 12,006

20 October 2012 11	Watford	1−0	Peterborough United	Vicarage Road
15:00	Vydra 90' (pen.)	Report		Attendance: 15,950

23 October 2012 12	Cardiff City	2−1	Watford	Cardiff City Stadium
19:45	Whittingham 71' (pen.); Gunnarsson 90+1'	Report	Hoban 28'	Attendance: 20,077

27 October 2012 13	Blackburn Rovers	1−0	Watford	Ewood Park
15:00	Rhodes 90+2'	Report		Attendance: 13,233

3 November 2012 14	Watford	2−1	Leicester City	Vicarage Road
15:00	Abdi 14'; Forestieri 68'	Report	Nugent 71'	Attendance: 12,954

6 November 2012 15	Watford	0−0	Millwall	Vicarage Road
19:45		Report		Attendance: 11,293

10 November 2012 16	Leeds United	1−6	Watford	Elland Road
15:00	Tonge 80' (pen.)	Report	Vydra 27', 82'; Abdi 62'; Yeates 75'; Murray 90+4'; Deeney 90+8'	Attendance: 19,104

17 November 2012 17	Watford	2−1	Wolverhampton Wanderers	Vicarage Road
15:00	Chalobah 35'; Deeney 68'	Report	Sako 54'	Attendance: 13,588

24 November 2012 18	Blackpool	2−2	Watford	Bloomfield Road
15:00	Phillips 52'; Osbourne 90'	Report	Anya 4'; Deeney 21'	Attendance: 13,076

27 November 2012 19	Sheffield Wednesday	1−4	Watford	Hillsborough
19:45	Antonio 3'	Report	Forestieri 18'; Geijo 67'; Deeney 75'; Yeates 83'	Attendance: 18,922

1 December 2012 20	Watford	4−1	Barnsley	Vicarage Road
15:00	Deeney 10', 66'; Yeates 59'; Vydra 83' (pen.)	Report	Tudgay 90+4'	Attendance: 11,335

8 December 2012 21	Watford	1−2	Hull City	Vicarage Road
15:00	Deeney 90+2'	Report	Meyler 41'; Brady 73'	Attendance: 12,156

15 December 2012 22	Burnley	1−1	Watford	Turf Moor
15:00	Austin 28' (pen.)	Report	Chalobah 11'	Attendance: 14,896

22 December 2012 23	Watford	2−0	Nottingham Forest	Vicarage Road
15:00	Yydra 15', 40'	Report		Attendance: 15,143

26 December 2012	Bristol City	P−P	Watford	Ashton Gate Stadium
15:00		Postponed due to waterlogged pitch

29 December 2012 24	Brighton & Hove Albion	1−3	Watford	Amex Stadium
15:00	López 65' (pen.)	Report	Deeney 54'; Vydra 68', 69'	Attendance: 26,727

1 January 2013 25	Watford	3−4	Charlton Athletic	Vicarage Road
13:00	Pudil 11'; Abdi 53' (pen.); Geijo 68'	Report	Hoban 34' (o.g.); Kermorgant 37', 70'; Jackson 78'	Attendance: 14,221; Referee: T. Kettle

12 January 2013 26	Middlesbrough	1−2	Watford	Riverside Stadium
15:00	McDonald 90'	Report	Vydra 45', 83'	Attendance: 17,499

19 January 2013 27	Watford	4−0	Huddersfield Town	Vicarage Road
15:00	Deeney 45' (pen.); Vydra 57', 74'; Battocchio 86'	Report		Attendance: 12,522; Referee: S. Duncan

26 January 2013 28	Nottingham Forest	0−3	Watford	City Ground
15:00		Report	Vydra 20', 72'; Deeney 34'	Attendance: 20,732

29 January 2013 29	Bristol City	2−0	Watford	Ashton Gate Stadium
19:45	Cunningham 43'; Anderson 65'	Report		Attendance: 13,586

2 February 2013 30	Watford	2−1	Bolton Wanderers	Vicarage Road
15:00	Vydra 36'; Abdi 70'	Report	Sordell 32' (pen.)	Attendance: 13,223

8 February 2013 31	Watford	2−2	Crystal Palace	Vicarage Road
19:45	Abdi 6'; Chalobah 14'	Report	Ramage 66'; Phillips 70'	Attendance: 15,079

16 February 2013 32	Birmingham City	0−4	Watford	St Andrew's
15:00		Report	Deeney 38', 62'; Anya 43'; Abdi 89'	Attendance: 18,933

19 February 2013 33	Ipswich Town	0−2	Watford	Portman Road
19:45		Report	Anya 18'; Chalobah 72'	Attendance: 16,821

23 February 2013 34	Watford	2−1	Derby County	Vicarage Road
15:00	Vydra 35'; Ekstrand 68'	Report	Ward 73' (pen.)	Attendance: 14,425

1 March 2013 35	Wolverhampton Wanderers	1−1	Watford	Molineux
19:45	Sako 90+3'	Report	Abdi 41'	Attendance: 18,571

5 March 2013 36	Watford	2−1	Sheffield Wednesday	Vicarage Road
19:45	Forestieri 53', 63'	Report	Antonio 19'	Attendance: 12,727

9 March 2013 37	Watford	1−2	Blackpool	Vicarage Road
15:00	Battocchio 27'	Report	Ince 76'; MacKenzie 88'	Attendance: 13,857

16 March 2013 38	Barnsley	1−0	Watford	Oakwell
15:00	Hassell 35'	Report		Attendance: 9,076

29 March 2013 39	Watford	3−3	Burnley	Vicarage Road
15:00	Deeney 6'; Forestieri 29', 72'	Report	Austin 1', 24' (pen.); Vokes 90'	Attendance: 15,435

1 April 2013 40	Hull City	0−1	Watford	KC Stadium
19:45		Report	Deeney 41'	Attendance: 20,043

6 April 2013 41	Watford	0−0	Cardiff City	Vicarage Road
15:00		Report		Attendance: 15,550

13 April 2013 42	Peterborough United	3−2	Watford	London Road
15:00	Swanson 20'; Gayle 61'; Tomlin 67'	Report	Yeates 85'; Forestieri 90'	Attendance: 10,848

16 April 2013 43	Millwall	1−0	Watford	The Den
19:45	Batt 83'	Report		Attendance: 9,366

20 April 2013 44	Watford	4−0	Blackburn Rovers	Vicarage Road
15:00	Deeney 52', 61'; Abdi 67'; Briggs 75'	Report		Attendance: 13,775

26 April 2013 45	Leicester City	1−2	Watford	King Power
19:45	Kane 61'	Report	Deeney 41'; Chalobah 43'	Attendance: 25,091

4 May 2013 46	Watford	1−2	Leeds United	Vicarage Road
12:45	Abdi 45'	Report	Poleon 42'; McCormack 90'	Attendance: 16,968

=== Championship play-offs ===
9 May 2013 Semi-Final 1st Leg	Leicester City	1−0	Watford	King Power Stadium
19:45	Schlupp (yellow card) 30'; Morgan (yellow card) 38'; Knockaert (yellow card) 45+2'; Keane (yellow card) 58'; Nugent 82'	Report	Anya (yellow card) 6'; Pudil (yellow card) 74'; Hall (yellow card) 90+4'	Attendance: 29,560

12 May 2013 Semi-Final 2nd Leg	Watford	3−1	Leicester City	Vicarage Road
12:30	Vydra 15', 65'; Cassetti (yellow card) 69'; Deeney 90+7' (yellow card) 90+10'	Report	Nugent 19'; Wood (yellow card) 30'; Knockaert (penalty missed) 90+7'	Attendance: 16,142

27 May 2013 Final	Crystal Palace	1−0 (a.e.t.)	Watford	Wembley Stadium
15:00	Mile Jedinak (yellow card) 28'; O'Keefe (yellow card) 60'; Joel Ward (yellow card) 80'; Moxey (yellow card) 104'; Phillips 105+1' (pen.)	Report	Ekstrand (yellow card) 10'; Abdi (yellow card) 60'; Cassetti (yellow card) 105'	Attendance: 82,025

== Football League Cup ==
The Football League Championship season started later than usual, due to the Olympic Games being held in London. Thus, Watford's first competitive game was in the League Cup, at home to League Two side Wycombe Wanderers. The game saw few chances, and was goalless after 90 minutes. Substitute Chris Iwelumo scored the winner for Watford in extra time, assisted by debutant Matěj Vydra. In the next round, Watford again hosted League Two opposition in the form of eventual cup runners up Bradford City. After a goalless first half, Ikechi Anya put Watford into the lead in the 71st minute, on his first start for the club. However, Bradford scored two late goals to win the match 2–1. Both of Bradford's goals were scored shortly after direct free kicks.

11 August 2012 Round 1	Watford	1–0 (a.e.t.)	Wycombe Wanderers	Vicarage Road
15:00	Iwelumo 110'			Attendance: 5,343

28 August 2012 Round 2	Watford	1–2	Bradford City	Vicarage Road
19:45	Anya 71'		Reid 84'; Thompson 90'	Attendance: 5,568

== FA Cup ==
Premier League and Championship clubs enter the FA Cup at the third-round stage, where they are joined by the 20 winners from the second round for a total of 64 teams. The draw took place on 2 December 2012. Watford were drawn away to 2011 winners and eventual finalists Manchester City where Manchester City won thanks to goals from Tevez, Barry and Lopes.

5 January 2013 Round 3	Manchester City	3–0	Watford	Etihad Stadium
15:00	Tevez 25'; Barry 44'; Lopes 90+1'	Report		Attendance: 46,821

== League table ==
Pos	Team	Pld	W	D	L	GF	GA	GD	Pts	Promotion or relegation
1	Cardiff City (C, P)	46	25	12	9	72	45	+27	87	Promotion to the Premier League
2	Hull City (P)	46	24	7	15	61	52	+9	79	Promotion to the Premier League
3	Watford	46	23	8	15	85	58	+27	77	Qualification for Championship play-offs
4	Brighton & Hove Albion	46	19	18	9	69	43	+26	75	Qualification for Championship play-offs
5	Crystal Palace (O, P)	46	19	15	12	73	62	+11	72	Qualification for Championship play-offs

Updated to match(es) played on 4 May 2013. Source: BBC Sport
Rules for classification: 1) points; 2) goal difference; 3) number of goals scored.
(C) Champions; (O) Play-off winners; (P) Promoted

=== Summary ===
Round	1	2	3	4	5	6	7	8	9	10	11	12	13	14	15	16	17	18	19	20	21	22	23	24	25	26	27	28	29	30	31	32	33	34	35	36	37	38	39	40	41	42	43	44	45	46
Ground	A	H	H	A	A	H	H	A	A	H	H	A	A	H	H	A	H	A	A	H	H	A	H	A	H	A	H	A	A	H	H	A	A	H	A	H	H	A	H	A	H	A	A	H	A	H
Result	W	L	W	L	L	L	D	W	W	L	W	L	L	W	D	W	W	D	W	W	L	D	W	W	L	W	W	W	L	W	D	W	W	W	D	W	L	L	D	W	D	L	L	W	W	L
Position	4	13	5	12	17	20	20	18	11	14	13	15	16	15	16	12	10	11	8	6	6	7	6	6	6	6	6	4	4	4	3	3	3	2	2	2	2	3	3	3	3	3	3	3	3	3

Updated to match(es) played on 4 May 2013. Source: BBC Sport
A = Away; H = Home; W = Win; D = Draw; L = Loss

== Players ==
=== Statistics ===
No. = Squad number

Pos = Playing position

P = Number of games played

G = Number of goals scored

= Yellow cards

GK = Goalkeeper

DF = Defender

MF = Midfielder

FW = Forward

= Red cards

Yth = Whether player went through Watford's youth system

Joined club = Year that player became a Watford first team player (Note: For players who came through the club's youth system the date used refers to when they signed a professional contract, unless they appeared in a first-team match-day squad prior to that, in which case that date is used.)

Age = Age at end of season (27 May 2013)

Left club during 2012–13

† Loan player

Statistics correct as of game played 27 May 2013.

2012–13 Watford player details (Note: All players who have been issued a 2012–13 squad number are listed)
No.	Pos	Name	P	G	P	G	P	G	P	G	P	G	Yellow cards	Red cards	Age	Joined club	Yth	Notes
No.	Pos	Name	Championship		FA Cup		League Cup		Play-offs		Total		Discipline		Age	Joined club	Yth	Notes
1	GK	Manuel Almunia	39	0	0	0	1	0	3	0	43	0	3	0	36	2012	No	—
2	DF	Lee Hodson	1+1	0	0	0	1+1	0	0	0	2+2	0	0	0	21	2009	Yes	—
3	DF	Carl Dickinson	2+2	0	0	0	2	0	0	0	4+2	0	1	0	26	2011	No	—
4	MF	John Eustace	2+3	0	1	0	1	0	0	0	4+3	0	2	0	33	2008	No	—
5	DF	Martin Taylor	3	1	0	0	2	0	0	0	5	1	1	0	33	2010	No	—
5	DF	Neuton	7+1	0	0+1	0	0	0	0	0	7+2	0	3	0	23	2012	No	†
6	DF	Fitz Hall	19+2	1	0	0	0	0	0+1	0	19+3	1	5	0	32	2012	No	—
7	MF	Mark Yeates	18+11	4	0	0	1	0	0	0	19+11	4	4	0	28	2011	No	—
8	MF	Jonathan Hogg	31+7	0	0	0	2	0	2+1	0	35+8	0	4	0	24	2011	No	—
9	FW	Troy Deeney	33+7	19	1	0	0	0	2	1	36+7	20	8	1	24	2010	No	—
10	FW	Chris Iwelumo	4+3	0	0	0	0+1	1	0	0	4+4	1	0	0	34	2011	No	—
11	MF	Craig Forsyth	1+1	0	0	0	1+1	0	0	0	2+2	0	0	0	24	2011	No	—
12	DF	Lloyd Doyley	28+6	1	1	0	1	0	3	0	33+6	1	2	0	30	2001	Yes	—
13	FW	Steve Leo Beleck	0+5	0	0	0	1	0	0	0	1+5	0	1	0	20	2012	No	†
14	MF	Ross Jenkins	0	0	0	0	1	0	0	0	1	0	0	0	22	2008	Yes	—
15	MF	Stephen McGinn	0	0	0	0	0	0	0	0	0	0	0	0	24	2010	No	—
16	MF	Sean Murray	8+7	1	0	0	0+1	0	0	0	8+8	1	0	0	19	2010	Yes	—
17	DF	Dale Bennett	0	0	0	0	0	0	0	0	0	0	0	0	23	2008	Yes	—
17	DF	Matthew Briggs	5+2	1	0	0	0	0	1+1	0	6+3	1	2	0	22	2013	No	†
18	DF	Daniel Pudil	35+2	1	1	0	0	0	2	0	38+2	1	11	1	27	2012	No	†
19	MF	Prince Buaben	0+1	0	0	0	0	0	0	0	0+1	0	0	0	25	2011	No	—
20	FW	Matěj Vydra	27+14	20	1	0	1+1	0	3	2	32+15	22	2	0	21	2012	No	†
21	MF	Ikechi Anya	18+7	3	0	0	1	1	3	0	22+7	4	1	0	25	2012	No	†
22	MF	Almen Abdi	36+2	12	0	0	1+1	0	3	0	40+3	12	6	0	26	2012	No	†
23	MF	Piero Mingoia	0	0	0	0	0	0	0	0	0	0	0	0	21	2010	Yes	—
24	FW	Matthew Whichelow	0	0	0	0	0	0	0	0	0	0	0	0	21	2010	Yes	—
25	FW	Joe Garner	2	0	0	0	1	0	0	0	3	0	0	0	25	2011	No	—
26	MF	Britt Assombalonga	0	0	0	0	0	0	0	0	0	0	0	0	20	2011	Yes	—
27	FW	Gavin Massey	0	0	0	0	0	0	0	0	0	0	0	0	20	2010	Yes	—
27	DF	Marco Cassetti	36+2	0	1	0	0	0	3	0	40+2	0	12	1	35	2012	No	†
28	FW	Connor Smith	2+5	0	0	0	0	0	0	0	2+5	0	1	0	20	2011	Yes	—
29	DF	Adam Thompson	0+4	0	0	0	1	0	0	0	1+4	0	0	0	20	2010	Yes	—
30	GK	Jonathan Bond	7+1	0	1	0	1	0	0	0	9+1	0	0	0	20	2010	Yes	—
31	DF	Tommie Hoban	19	2	0	0	0	0	0	0	19	2	0	0	19	2011	Yes	—
32	DF	Aaron Tumwa	0	0	0	0	0	0	0	0	0	0	0	0	19	2012	Yes	—
33	DF	Nyron Nosworthy	18+1	0	1	0	1	0	0	0	20+1	0	2	0	32	2011	No	—
34	GK	Jack Bonham	0+1	0	0	0	0	0	0	0	0+1	0	0	0	19	2010	Yes	—
35	MF	Stephan Hamilton-Forbes	0	0	0	0	0	0	0	0	0	0	0	0	19	2012	Yes	—
36	FW	Alexandre Geijo	7+11	2	0	0	0	0	1+1	0	8+12	2	0	0	31	2012	No	†
37	MF	Geoffrey Mujangi Bia	0+3	0	0+1	0	1	0	0	0	1+4	0	1	0	23	2012	No	†
38	MF	Cristian Battocchio	15+7	2	0+1	0	0	0	1+1	0	16+9	2	0	0	21	2012	No	†
39	DF	Nathaniel Chalobah	34+4	5	1	0	0	0	3	0	38+4	5	4	1	18	2012	No	†
40	DF	Joel Ekstrand	29+3	1	1	0	0	0	3	0	33+3	1	9	0	24	2012	No	†
41	FW	Fernando Forestieri	19+9	8	1	0	0	0	0+3	0	20+12	8	5	1	23	2012	No	-
42	DF	Jean-Alain Fanchone	1	0	0	0	0	0	0	0	1	0	0	0	24	2012	No	†

=== Transfers ===
Unless a country is specified, all clubs play in the English football league system.

==== In ====
The transfer window opened on 1 July, but Watford did not make any signings in the early part of pre-season, amid reports that the club was under a transfer embargo due to an administrative error. The club confirmed seven signings at the end of July, five of which were season-long loans from other clubs owned by the Pozzo family. The permanent transfers were goalkeeper Manuel Almunia and centre back Fitz Hall, following the departures of Scott Loach and Adrian Mariappa in their respective positions.

Date	Player	From	Fee
30 July 2012	Manuel Almunia	Arsenal	Free
30 July 2012	Fitz Hall	Queens Park Rangers	Free
14 January 2013	Fernando Forestieri	Udinese	Unknown

==== Out ====
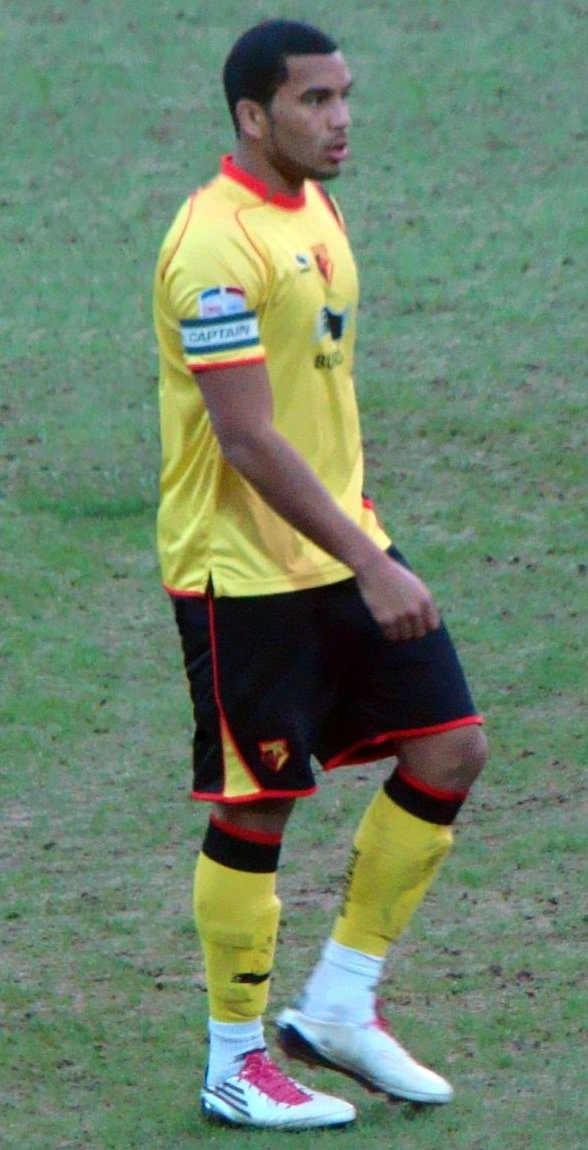
Adrian Mariappa joined Reading before the start of the season.

At the end of the 2011–12 season, the club announced that five players would be released at the end of their contracts. The summer transfer window opened on 1 July, and two high-profile departures followed during pre-season. 2011–12 Player of the Season Adrian Mariappa joined newly promoted Premier League side Reading on 17 July. Two days later, Scott Loach – the team's most-used goalkeeper from the previous season – transferred to Ipswich Town, the club he supported as a child. The club's final sale of the summer was Martin Taylor to Sheffield Wednesday. Taylor extended his contract shortly before Sean Dyche's departure from the club, and captained the team during his final two games under Gianfranco Zola, but was allowed to leave on the final day of the transfer window.

Date	Player	To	Fee
3 May 2012	Rene Gilmartin	Plymouth Argyle	Free (end of contract)
3 May 2012	Michael Bryan	Free agent	Free (end of contract)
3 May 2012	Tom James	Nuneaton Borough	Free (end of contract)
3 May 2012	Chez Isaac	Borehamwood	Free (end of contract)
3 May 2012	Josh Walker	Scunthorpe United	Free (end of contract)
17 July 2012	Adrian Mariappa	Reading	Undisclosed
19 July 2012	Scott Loach	Ipswich Town	Undisclosed
31 July 2012	David Mirfin	Scunthorpe United (Note: Mirfin was released by Watford on a mutual termination, but immediately joined Scunthorpe United.)	Mutual termination
21 August 2012	Gavin Massey	Colchester United	Free
31 August 2012	Martin Taylor	Sheffield Wednesday	Undisclosed
8 January 2013	Joe Garner	Preston North End	Mutual termination
24 January 2013	Dale Bennett	Forest Green Rovers	Undisclosed
4 February 2013	Matthew Whichelow	Free agent	Mutual termination

=== Loans ===
==== In ====
Watford signed 14 players on season-long loans in the summer transfer window. 12 players joined from clubs also owned by the Pozzo family; 10 from Udinese and 2 from Granada. Watford also signed Nathaniel Chalobah and Geoffrey Mujangi Bia from Chelsea and Standard Liège respectively. Jean-Alain Fanchone returned to Udinese in January, while Fernando Forestieri also signed a permanent contract with Watford that month. The club added a 15th loan player in March, with Matthew Briggs joining from Fulham until the end of the season.

Start	Player	Parent club	End
30 July 2012	Almen Abdi	Udinese (Italy)	Season-long loan
30 July 2012	Ikechi Anya	Granada (Spain)	Season-long loan
30 July 2012	Steve Leo Beleck	Udinese (Italy)	Season-long loan
30 July 2012	Daniel Pudil	Granada (Spain)	Season-long loan
30 July 2012	Matěj Vydra	Udinese (Italy)	Season-long loan
9 August 2012	Alexandre Geijo	Udinese (Italy)	Season-long loan
23 August 2012	Marco Cassetti	Udinese (Italy)	Season-long loan
24 August 2012	Geoffrey Mujangi Bia	Standard Liège (Belgium)	Season-long loan
31 August 2012	Cristian Battocchio	Udinese (Italy)	Season-long loan
31 August 2012	Nathaniel Chalobah	Chelsea	Season-long loan
31 August 2012	Joel Ekstrand	Udinese (Italy)	Season-long loan
31 August 2012	Jean-Alain Fanchone	Udinese (Italy)	15 January 2013
31 August 2012	Fernando Forestieri	Udinese (Italy)	Season-long loan
31 August 2012	Neuton	Udinese (Italy)	Season-long loan
1 March 2013	Matthew Briggs	Fulham	End of season

==== Out ====
Start	Player	To	Level	End
17 August 2012	Britt Assombalonga	Southend United	League Two	17 September 2012
30 August 2012	Adam Thompson	Wycombe Wanderers	League Two	30 September 2012
31 August 2012	Dale Bennett	AFC Wimbledon	League Two	30 September 2012
17 September 2012	Matthew Whichelow	Accrington Stanley	League Two	18 December 2012
17 September 2012	Piero Mingoia	Accrington Stanley	League Two	17 October 2012
18 September 2012	Joe Garner	Carlisle United	League One	20 November 2012
21 September 2012	Ross Jenkins	Plymouth Argyle	League Two	21 September 2012
19 October 2012	Craig Forsyth	Bradford City	League Two	22 December 2012
22 October 2012	Carl Dickinson	Portsmouth	League One	19 November 2012
3 November 2012	Stephan Hamilton-Forbes	Havant & Waterlooville	Conference South	1 December 2012
17 November 2012	Aaron Tumwa	Wealdstone	Isthmian League	22 December 2012
17 November 2012	Matt Bevans	Chesham United	Southern Football League	17 December 2012
22 November 2012	Dale Bennett	Yeovil Town	League One	22 November 2012
23 November 2012	Chris Iwelumo	Notts County	League One	4 January 2013
4 January 2013	Adam Thompson	Barnet	League Two	14 January 2013
4 January 2013	Steve Leo Beleck	Stevenage	League One	End of Season
4 January 2013	Stephen McGinn	Shrewsbury Town	League One	27 April 2013
31 January 2013	Chris Iwelumo	Oldham Athletic	League One	End of Season
31 January 2013	Piero Mingoia	Boreham Wood	Conference South	End of Season

== Reserves and academy ==
Watford's academy intake in 2012–13 consisted of 21 scholars:

- In the second year, defenders Kyle Connolly and Jordan Wilmore, midfielders Austin Eaton, Luke O'Nien, Jack Westlake, and striker Bernard Mensah.
- In the first year, goalkeeper Daniel Wilks, defenders Jazzi Barnum Bobb, Oliver Crowley, Josh Doherty and Jorell Johnson, midfielders Bobson Bawling, George Byers, Ollie Cox, Kurtis Cumberbatch, Chris Dillon, Ryan Hope, and Robert Westcott, and strikers Jamie Calvin-Pay and Alex Jakubiak.

In addition, defender Matt Bevans had his scholarship from the previous year extended by a number of months after an injury kept him out for most of the previous season. In July 2011, Mensah signed a contract that saw him turn professional on his 17th birthday, later signing an extended contract in January 2013. In June 2013 O'Nien signed a one-year professional deal with the club, while Connolly, Wilmore, Eaton and English were released. Westlake was offered an extension to his scholarship of six months after missing a large period of the season through injury.
