= Nathaniel Chalobah =

English footballer (born 1994)

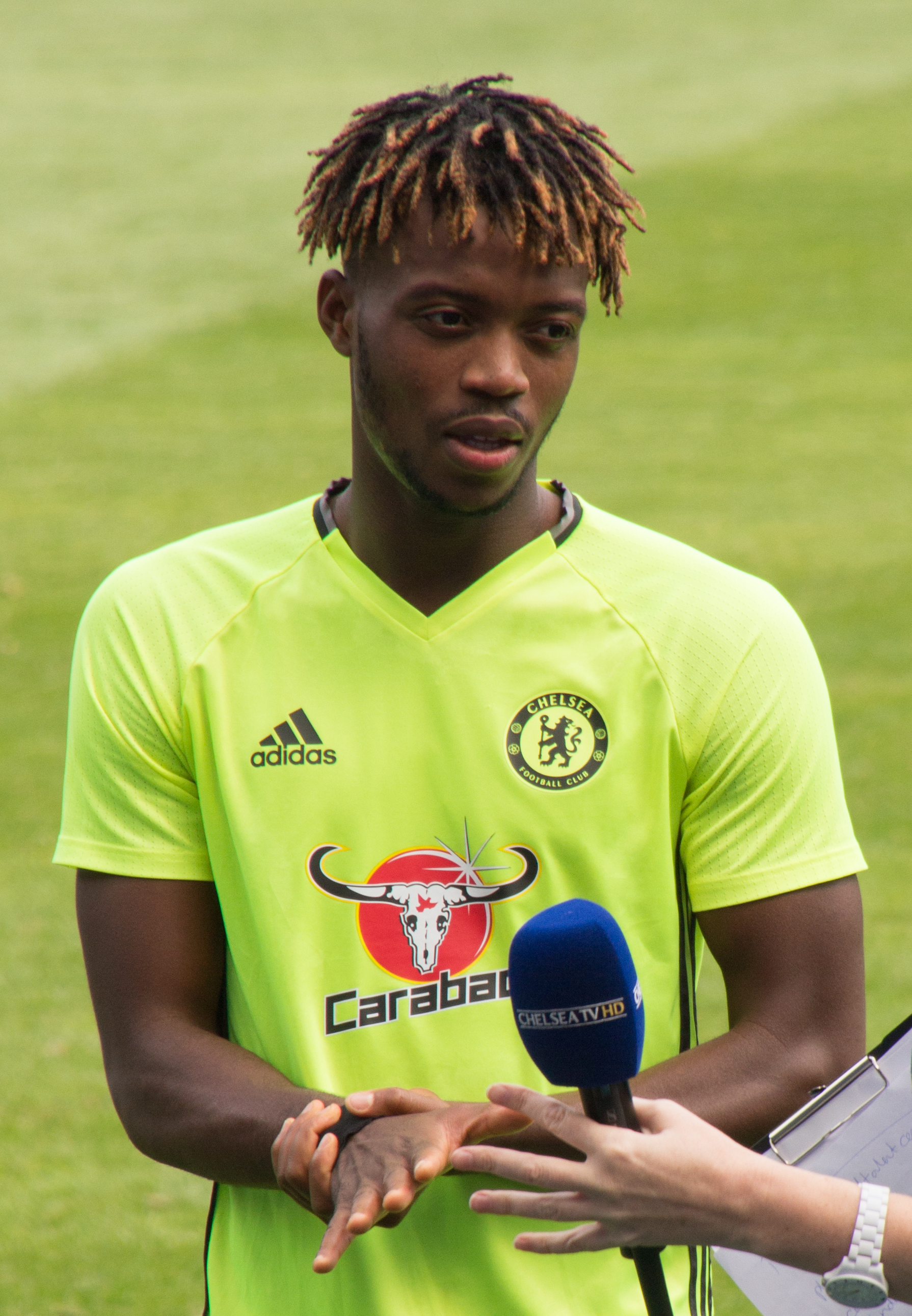
- Chalobah training with Chelsea in 2016

Personal information
- Full name: Nathaniel Nyakie Chalobah
- Date of birth: 12 December 1994 (age 31)
- Place of birth: Freetown, Sierra Leone
- Height: 6 ft 2 in (1.87 m)
- Position: Defensive midfielder

Team information
- Current team: Charlton Athletic
- Number: 15

Youth career
- 2004–2005: Fulham
- 2005–2012: Chelsea

Senior career*
Years	Team	Apps	(Gls)
2012–2017	Chelsea	10	(0)
2012–2013	→ Watford (loan)	38	(5)
2013–2014	→ Nottingham Forest (loan)	12	(2)
2014	→ Middlesbrough (loan)	19	(1)
2014–2015	→ Burnley (loan)	4	(0)
2015	→ Reading (loan)	15	(1)
2015–2016	→ Napoli (loan)	5	(0)
2017–2021	Watford	75	(3)
2021–2023	Fulham	24	(0)
2023–2024	West Bromwich Albion	46	(0)
2024–2026	Sheffield Wednesday	29	(2)
2026–	Charlton Athletic	5	(0)

International career
2008–2009	England U16	6	(0)
2009–2011	England U17	34	(1)
2011–2012	England U19	13	(2)
2014	England U20	4	(0)
2012–2017	England U21	40	(1)
2018	England	1	(0)
Medal record
Men's football
Representing England
UEFA European Under-17 Championship
Winner	2010 Liechtenstein
- * Club domestic league appearances and goals as of 22:10, 3 November 2026 (UTC)

Nathaniel Nyakie Chalobah (born 12 December 1994) is a professional footballer who plays as a defensive midfielder for EFL Championship club Charlton Athletic. Born in Sierra Leone, he represented the England national team.

== Club career ==
=== Chelsea ===
After initially joining the academy system at Fulham, Chalobah moved to the Chelsea academy at the age of 10. During the 2010–11 season, he featured for Chelsea reserves while still a schoolboy, winning the national championship with the team that season. In 2011–12, Chalobah regularly captained both Chelsea's reserve and youth teams, and led the 2012 FA Youth Cup winning team. He signed a professional contract with Chelsea in January 2012 shortly after turning 17, lasting until summer 2014. He was an unused substitute for the Chelsea first-team at the age of 15, in their League Cup clash against Newcastle and travelled with them to the 2012 UEFA Champions League Final at the Allianz Arena, which Chelsea won. On 30 August 2013, Chalobah signed a new five-year contract with Chelsea, stating that he wished to stay at Chelsea for his entire career.

==== Loan to Watford ====
Chalobah signed on loan for Championship club Watford on 31 August 2012 until January 2013. He made his first-team debut for the club on 18 September 2012 against Brighton & Hove Albion, coming on as a 73rd-minute substitute for Fernando Forestieri. He later made his first start, lasting the full 90 minutes in Watford's 2–2 draw with Bristol City on 23 September. On 17 November, Chalobah scored his first goal for Watford in a 2–1 win over Wolverhampton Wanderers. He scored his second goal for Watford in a 1–1 draw against Burnley, on 15 December, with a fine volley from the edge of the box.

On 2 January 2013, Chalobah extended his loan at Watford until the end of the 2012–13 season. In April, he scored with a 35-yard shot that Leicester City goalkeeper Kasper Schmeichel said he never saw; Watford won 2–1.

Chalobah played for Watford as they reached the 2013 Championship play-off final, in which they were defeated 1–0 by Crystal Palace.

==== Loan to Nottingham Forest ====
On 19 September 2013 Chalobah signed a loan deal with Nottingham Forest until 15 January 2014. Manager Billy Davies remarked upon his arrival, "He's a tremendous young talent." Chalobah made his debut from the start in Forest's trip to Doncaster Rovers on 21 September 2013. On 5 October 2013, Chalobah was sent off after a second booking in the 67th minute after already picking up a yellow in the first half during the away match against Brighton & Hove Albion. Though Forest were down to 10 men, they saw out a 3–1 victory. Chalobah scored his first Forest goal in a 3–1 defeat away to Yeovil Town on 26 October 2013.

==== Loan to Middlesbrough ====
On 16 January 2014, Chalobah joined Middlesbrough on loan for the remainder of the 2013–14 season. On 25 January 2014, Chalobah made his debut against Leicester City, coming off the bench in the 77th minute to replace Emmanuel Ledesma. The match ended in a 2–0 loss for Middlesbrough. Chalobah made his first start on 1 February 2014, in a match against Doncaster Rovers which ended in a 0–0 draw. On 5 April 2014, Chalobah scored his first Boro goal in a 1–0 win at home to Derby County.

==== Loan to Burnley ====
On 1 September 2014, Chalobah joined Premier League newcomers Burnley on loan from Chelsea until 2 January 2015. On 28 September 2014, Chalobah made his debut as a first-half substitute against West Bromwich Albion, although he could not prevent Burnley from losing 4–0. On 30 September, Chalobah suffered an injury after being hit with an elbow in the throat in a Burnley U21s match, which caused a cartilage to fracture. Chalobah returned to the pitch for the first team on 18 October 2014 against West Ham United. On 1 November 2014, Chalobah played his last match for Burnley against Arsenal, which ended in a 3–0 loss.

Chalobah was unable to break into the first team at Burnley and returned to Chelsea when the loan ended on 2 January 2015. During his time with Burnley, Chalobah only made four substitute appearances.

==== Loan to Reading ====
On 22 January 2015, Chalobah joined Championship club Reading on loan for the remainder of the season. On 24 January 2015, Chalobah made his debut in a FA Cup match against Cardiff City, as the team won 2–1 to advance into the fifth round. Three days later, Chalobah made his league debut against Millwall.

On 31 January 2015, in his home debut, Chalobah scored the second of a 2–0 victory over Sheffield Wednesday, helping the Royals to their first league win since December. During his time with Reading, Chalobah made a total of 20 appearances and started in every appearance.

==== Loan to Napoli ====
On 1 September 2015, Italian club Napoli confirmed that Chalobah had joined the club on a season long loan from Chelsea. On 1 October 2015, Chalobah made his Napoli debut in a UEFA Europa League tie against Legia Warsaw. The fixture resulted in a 2–0 victory for the Italian team, with Chalobah featuring for five minutes after replacing Allan. On 26 November 2015, Chalobah was given his first Napoli start in a 1–0 victory over Club Brugge in the UEFA Europa League group stage tie. On 10 December 2015, Chalobah scored his first Napoli goal in a 5–2 win over Legia Warsaw, scoring Napoli's first. On 6 January 2016, Chalobah finally made his Serie A debut in a 2–1 victory against Torino, replacing Marek Hamšík in the 89th minute.

Chalobah went on to make four more league appearances for Napoli before returning to Chelsea at the end of the campaign.

==== 2016–17 season ====
In the summer of 2016, Chelsea rejected loan offers for Chalobah after new manager Antonio Conte had been impressed with Chalobah in pre-season, deciding that he should remain as part of Chelsea's first-team group. Chalobah made his first-team debut on 20 September 2016, when he came off the bench to replace Michy Batshuayi in the 79th minute of a 4–2 win over Leicester City to advance to the Fourth round of the EFL Cup. On 15 October 2016, on his second league appearance for Chelsea, Chalobah provided a back-heel pass to play Victor Moses through for the third goal in a 3–0 victory over Leicester City.

=== Return to Watford ===
On 13 July 2017, Chalobah signed for Premier League club Watford on a five-year contract for an undisclosed fee. On 26 September 2017, Chalobah was reported to have suffered a knee injury in a training session and was expected to have surgery.

=== Fulham ===
On the last day of the 2021 summer transfer window, Chalobah joined recently relegated Championship side Fulham on a free transfer, keeping him until 2023 with an option to extend by a further year and was once again reunited with manager Marco Silva. He made his debut for the club, playing the whole game, in a 4–1 win against Birmingham City on 15 September 2021.

=== West Bromwich Albion ===
On 31 January 2023, Chalobah returned to the Championship with West Bromwich Albion, signing an eighteen-month contract. On 7 January 2024, Chalobah scored his first goal for the club in a 4-1 home win against Aldershot Town in a FA Cup third round game. On 22 May 2024, the club announced he would be leaving in the summer when his contract expired.

=== Sheffield Wednesday ===
On 13 July 2024, Chalobah joined Championship side Sheffield Wednesday on a free transfer. He made his debut in the EFL Cup on 27 August, starting in the 5–1 victory against Grimsby Town. His first league appearance came against Derby County on 1 December 2024 when he came on as a 70th minute substitute. He scored his first goal for Wednesday on the opening day of the 2025–26 season, before having to come off injured a few minutes later. At the end of the 2025–26 season, it was confirmed that he would be leaving at the end of his contract.

=== Charlton Athletic ===
On 7 August 2026, Chalobah, having spent time on trial at the club over the summer, joined Charlton Athletic, signing a one-year deal. He made his debut the following day in the EFL Cup, starting the game and getting an assist in the 3–1 victory against Cheltenham Town.

== International career ==
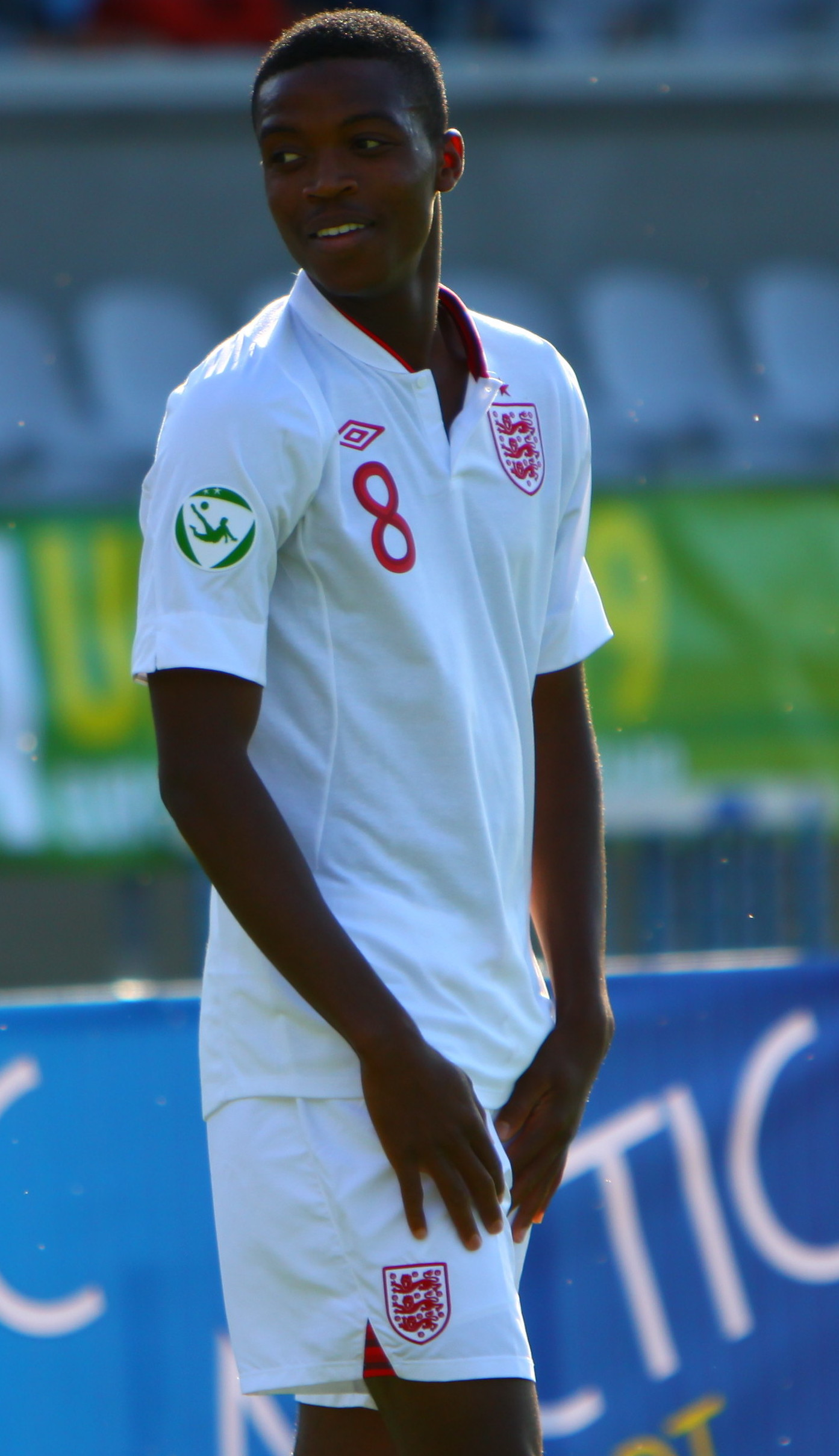
Chalobah playing for England under-19s in 2012

Chalobah made his England under-16 debut at the age of 13 in October 2008, and his England under-17 debut aged 14 in July 2009. He won the 2010 UEFA European Under-17 Championship and later captaining the team at the age of 15. Chalobah made his England under-19 debut in September 2011, and went on to captain them. He was called up to the England under-21 squad for a match against Northern Ireland on 13 November 2012, and made his debut at that level replacing Jordan Henderson in the 76th minute.

Chalobah was also eligible to play for Sierra Leone, the country where he was born, but has stated that he has a strong affiliation to England, the country of his upbringing.

In August 2017, Chalobah was named in the England squad for the first time for the 2018 FIFA World Cup qualifiers against Malta and Slovakia. He made his debut on 15 October 2018 as a substitute for Harry Winks in the first minute of stoppage time in England's 3–2 win away to Spain in the 2018–19 UEFA Nations League A, with the competitive status of the fixture tying him to England permanently from then on. As he came on in added time for his only England cap, Chalobah officially has an England career of zero minutes, but in actual time he played for 6 minutes and 54 seconds. This is one second more than Martin Kelly, who holds the record for shortest England career in actual time played.

== Style of play ==
Chalobah is known for his versatility, work-rate, and fitness levels, both in defending and attacking sense. He is described as, "Tall, athletic and can operate in either midfield or defence, being notably quick in the tackle."

== Personal life ==
Born in Freetown, Sierra Leone, Chalobah moved to England at the age of seven and grew up in Gipsy Hill in the London Borough of Lambeth. He played football for the first time at the age of nine. Chalobah attended St Andrews R.C. Primary school and further studied at Bishop Thomas Grant School in Streatham, South London. His younger brother Trevoh joined Chelsea as an Under–9 and has been capped by England up to senior level.

== Career statistics ==
=== Club ===
As of match played 3 November 2026

Appearances and goals by club, season and competition
Club	Season	League			National Cup (Note: Includes FA Cup, Coppa Italia)		League Cup (Note: Includes EFL Cup)		Europe		Other		Total	
Club	Season	Division	Apps	Goals	Apps	Goals	Apps	Goals	Apps	Goals	Apps	Goals	Apps	Goals
Chelsea	2010–11	Premier League	0	0	0	0	0	0	0	0	0	0	0	0
Chelsea	2011–12	Premier League	0	0	0	0	0	0	0	0	—		0	0
Chelsea	2012–13	Premier League	0	0	—		—		—		0	0	0	0
Chelsea	2013–14	Premier League	0	0	—		—		0	0	—		0	0
Chelsea	2014–15	Premier League	0	0	0	0	0	0	—		—		0	0
Chelsea	2015–16	Premier League	0	0	—		—		—		0	0	0	0
Chelsea	2016–17	Premier League	10	0	3	0	2	0	—		—		15	0
Chelsea	Total		10	0	3	0	2	0	0	0	0	0	15	0
Watford (loan)	2012–13	Championship	38	5	1	0	—		—		3 (Note: Appearances in Championship play-offs)	0	42	5
Nottingham Forest (loan)	2013–14	Championship	12	2	0	0	—		—		—		12	2
Middlesbrough (loan)	2013–14	Championship	19	1	—		—		—		—		19	1
Burnley (loan)	2014–15	Premier League	4	0	—		—		—		—		4	0
Reading (loan)	2014–15	Championship	15	1	5	0	—		—		—		20	1
Napoli (loan)	2015–16	Serie A	5	0	1	0	—		3 (Note: Appearances in UEFA Europa League)	1	—		9	1
Watford	2017–18	Premier League	6	0	0	0	0	0	—		—		6	0
Watford	2018–19	Premier League	9	0	2	0	2	0	—		—		13	0
Watford	2019–20	Premier League	22	0	1	1	3	0	—		—		26	1
Watford	2020–21	Championship	38	3	1	0	1	0	—		—		40	3
Watford	Total		113	8	5	1	6	0	—		—		127	9
Fulham	2021–22	Championship	20	0	2	0	0	0	—		—		22	0
Fulham	2022–23	Premier League	4	0	1	0	1	0	—		—		6	0
Fulham	Total		24	0	3	0	1	0	—		—		28	0
West Bromwich Albion	2022–23	Championship	13	0	0	0	0	0	—		—		13	0
West Bromwich Albion	2023–24	Championship	33	0	2	1	1	0	—		—		36	1
West Bromwich Albion	Total		46	0	2	1	1	0	—		—		49	1
Sheffield Wednesday	2024–25	Championship	16	0	1	0	1	0	—		—		18	0
Sheffield Wednesday	2025–26	Championship	13	2	0	0	0	0	—		—		13	2
Sheffield Wednesday	Total		29	2	1	0	1	0	—		—		31	2
Charlton Athletic	2026–27	Championship	5	0	0	0	1	0	—		—		6	0
Career total			282	14	20	2	12	0	3	1	3	0	320	17

=== International ===
Appearances and goals by national team and year
National team	Year	Apps	Goals
England	2018	1	0
Total		1	0

== Honours ==
Chelsea

- Premier League: 2016–17

Fulham

- EFL Championship: 2021–22

England U17

- UEFA European Under-17 Championship: 2010

England U21

- Toulon Tournament: 2016

Individual

- England Men's Youth Player of the Year: 2012
- Football League Young Player of the Month: May 2013

== See also ==
- List of England international footballers born outside England
