= Almen Abdi =

Swiss footballer (born 1986)

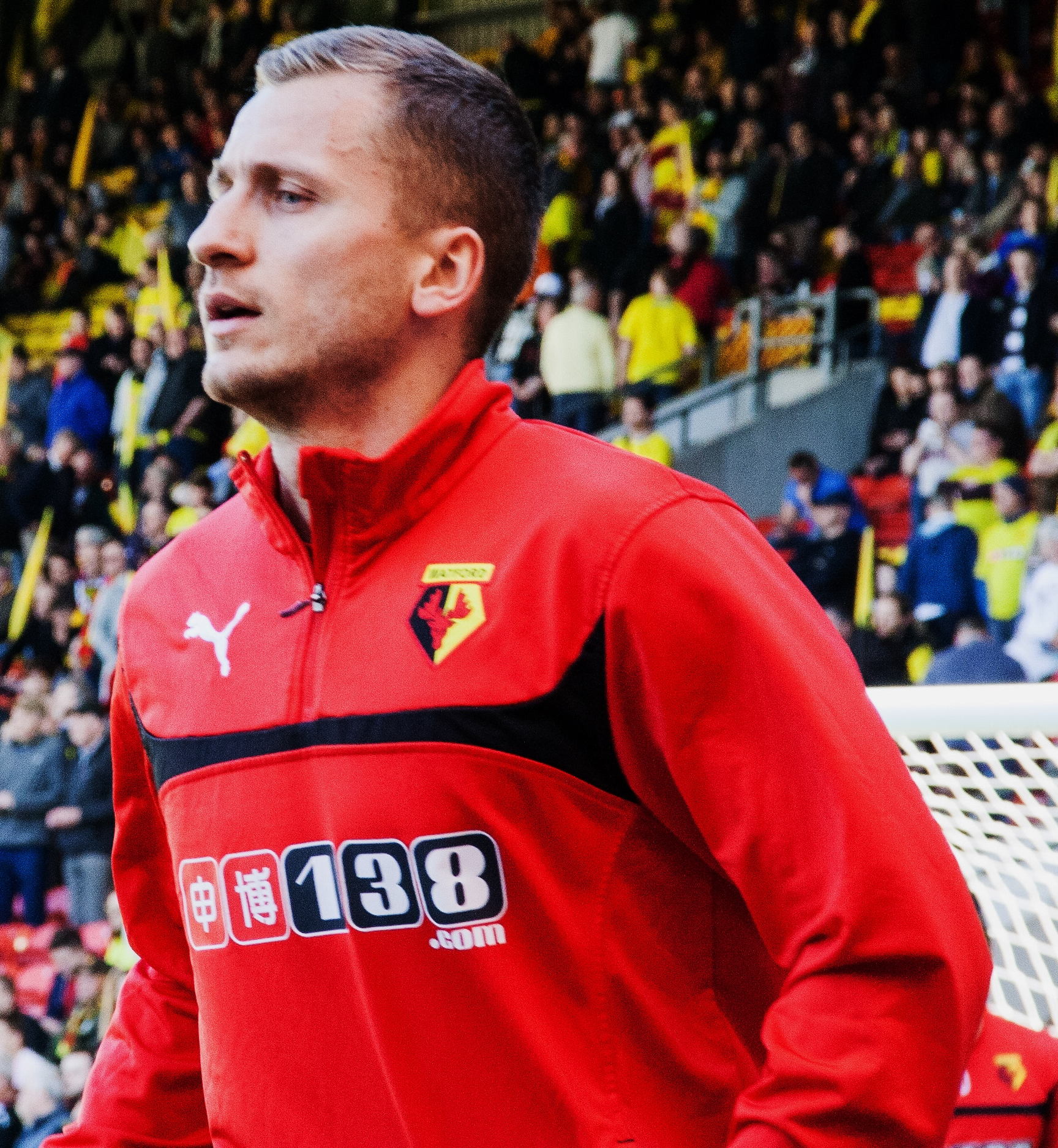
- Abdi at Watford, 2015

Personal information
- Full name: Almen Abdi
- Date of birth: 21 October 1986 (age 40)
- Place of birth: Prizren, SR Serbia, SFR Yugoslavia (modern Kosovo)
- Height: 1.80 m (5 ft 11 in)
- Position: Attacking midfielder

Youth career
- 1994–2003: Zürich

Senior career*
Years	Team	Apps	(Gls)
2003–2009	Zürich	132	(31)
2009–2010	Le Mans	13	(0)
2010–2013	Udinese	42	(0)
2012–2013	→ Watford (loan)	38	(12)
2013–2016	Watford	77	(13)
2016–2019	Sheffield Wednesday	20	(1)
Total		322	(57)

International career
2007–2008	Switzerland U21	5	(0)
2008–2009	Switzerland	6	(0)
- * Club domestic league appearances and goals

Almen Abdi (born 21 October 1986) is a Swiss former footballer who played as an attacking midfielder. He played for Zürich, Le Mans, Udinese, Watford and Sheffield Wednesday. He was capped on six occasions by the Switzerland national team.

== Career ==
=== Zürich ===
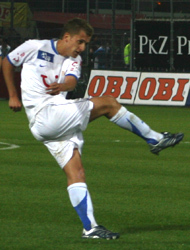
Abdi takes a shot against Luzern

Abdi started his football career at Zürich, where he joined the youth academy in 1993 and came through the ranks. He made his professional debut at age seventeen in the 2003–04 season, coming on as a substitute for Arthur Petrosyan in the 89th minute, in a 2–1 loss against Basel. Throughout his first three seasons at Zürich, Abdi featured little, and mostly remained a bench player. However, the 2006–07 season was Abdi's breakthrough season, making more appearances than ever and establishing himself as a first team starter. During the 2006–07 season, Abdi would make his Champions League debut in the second qualification round against Austrian side Red Bull Salzburg, after coming on as a substitute. He scored his first league goal on 29 July 2006, in a 2–0 win over Schaffhausen.

Abdi was part of the 2005–06, 2006–07 and 2008–09 Swiss Championship winning Zürich squad. He was awarded an improved contract in June 2006 which would last until the summer of 2010. Having finished as the club's top goalscorer in the 2008–09 league campaign with 19 goals and adding an impressive 12 assists, Abdi was not only named the best midfielder in the Swiss Super League, but also presented with the season's Best Swiss Player Award. In the 2009–10 season, Abdi was dropped to the FC Zürich reserve team in November 2009, alongside teammate Andrés Vasquez, with FC Zürich stating they were planning for the future without the duo.

=== Le Mans ===
In January 2010, Abdi was transferred to Le Mans on a six-month contract with the option to extend it at a later date, should the club remain in Ligue 1. However, Le Mans failed to avoid relegation to Ligue 2 at the end of the campaign, with Abdi making a total of 13 appearances.

=== Udinese ===
In April 2010, Abdi confirmed that he would be joining Udinese in the summer once he became a free agent. In Udine, he made 19 appearances during the 2010–11 season, most of them coming from the bench. The following campaign saw Abdi score his first goal for the Friulian club in the Europa League on 29 September 2011, converting the penalty to equalise against Celtic at Celtic Park. Shortly after, there was a rumour of Abdi making a return to Zürich. But Abdi denied any rumour of him being linked to Zürich, insisting he felt fine and settled at Udinese.

=== Watford ===
In July 2012, Abdi trained with Watford with a view to a possible loan. He featured in the Championship side's first three pre-season friendlies, and later joined the club on a season-long loan for the 2012–13. Abdi scored his first goal for Watford on his league debut against Crystal Palace on 18 August 2012. Abdi soon injured his shoulder, dislocating it in November 2012. Following four weeks of regeneration, he returned to the bench and came on as a substitute during the 2–1 home loss against Hull City on 8 December 2012. Abdi made it three league goals in as many games with his effort against Birmingham City on 16 February 2013, taking his total goal tally to 9. Abdi had netted in the previous two games against Bolton Wanderers and Crystal Palace. Abdi then scored his 10th goal of the season with a sumptuous free kick in a 1–1 draw with Wolverhampton Wanderers on 1 March 2013. Towards the end of the season, Abdi reportedly stated his desire to remain at Watford on a permanent basis, having become the club's fan favorite. In early May 2013, he picked up the Hornets' Player of the Season award.

On 19 July 2013, Watford confirmed that Abdi had signed a three-year deal on a permanent basis. In August 2013, he developed a severe case of plantar fasciitis (a foot disease), which kept him out of action for several months. Abdi made his long-awaited comeback as a 75th-minute substitute in a 2–0 FA Cup third round replay victory over Bristol City on 14 January 2014. Abdi then made his league return four days later, as a first-half substitute against AFC Bournemouth on 18 January 2014, coming on for the injured Iriney.

Making his first league start for seven months, Abdi scored for Watford in a 3–0 home win over Leeds United on 8 April 2014.

On 30 August 2014, Abdi scored his first ever brace for the club at Vicarage Road as Watford beat Huddersfield Town 4–2, with Abdi providing the goals to make it 2–1 and 4–2 respectively as well as registering an assist in the same game.

=== Sheffield Wednesday ===
On 28 July 2016, Abdi joined Championship side Sheffield Wednesday for an undisclosed fee.

He was released by Sheffield Wednesday at the end of the 2018–19 season.

== International career ==
He made his senior Switzerland international debut against Cyprus on 20 August 2008. He was eligible for the Albania national team and the Kosovo national team as well but chose Switzerland.

== Personal life ==
On 24 April 2011, Abdi was targeted by burglars and his possessions were stolen. He is good friends with compatriot and ex-Udinese teammate Gökhan Inler. He is an ethnically Gorani, from Prizren, Kosovo and he as well as his family is of Muslim faith.

== Career statistics ==
As of match played15 May 2016

Appearances and goals by club, season and competition
Club	Season	League			Cup		League Cup		Other		Total	
Club	Season	Division	Apps	Goals	Apps	Goals	Apps	Goals	Apps	Goals	Apps	Goals
Zürich	2003–04	Swiss Super League	12	0	0	0	0	0	0	0	12	0
Zürich	2004–05	Swiss Super League	9	0	2	0	0	0	0	0	11	0
Zürich	2005–06	Swiss Super League	10	0	1	1	0	0	2	0	13	1
Zürich	2006–07	Swiss Super League	30	5	5	4	0	0	1	0	36	9
Zürich	2007–08	Swiss Super League	31	7	2	1	0	0	2	0	35	7
Zürich	2008–09	Swiss Super League	32	19	2	1	0	0	4	1	37	21
Zürich	2009–10	Swiss Super League	8	0	2	1	0	0	4	1	15	2
Zürich	Total		132	31	14	8	0	0	13	2	159	41
Le Mans	2009–10	Ligue 1	13	0	1	0	0	0	0	0	14	0
Udinese	2010–11	Serie A	19	0	2	0	0	0	0	0	21	0
Udinese	2011–12	Serie A	23	0	1	0	0	0	9	1	33	1
Udinese	Total		42	0	3	0	0	0	9	1	54	1
Watford	2012–13	Championship	38	12	0	0	2	0	3	0	43	12
Watford	2013–14	Championship	13	2	2	0	0	0	0	0	15	2
Watford	2014–15	Championship	32	9	1	0	0	0	0	0	33	9
Watford	2015–16	Premier League	32	2	5	0	1	0	0	0	38	1
Watford	Total		115	25	8	0	3	0	3	0	129	24
Career total			302	56	26	8	3	0	25	3	356	66

== Honours ==
FC Zürich

- Swiss Cup: 2004–05
- Super League/Nationalliga A: 2005–06, 2006–07, 2008–09
