= Fernando Forestieri =

Association football player (born 1990)

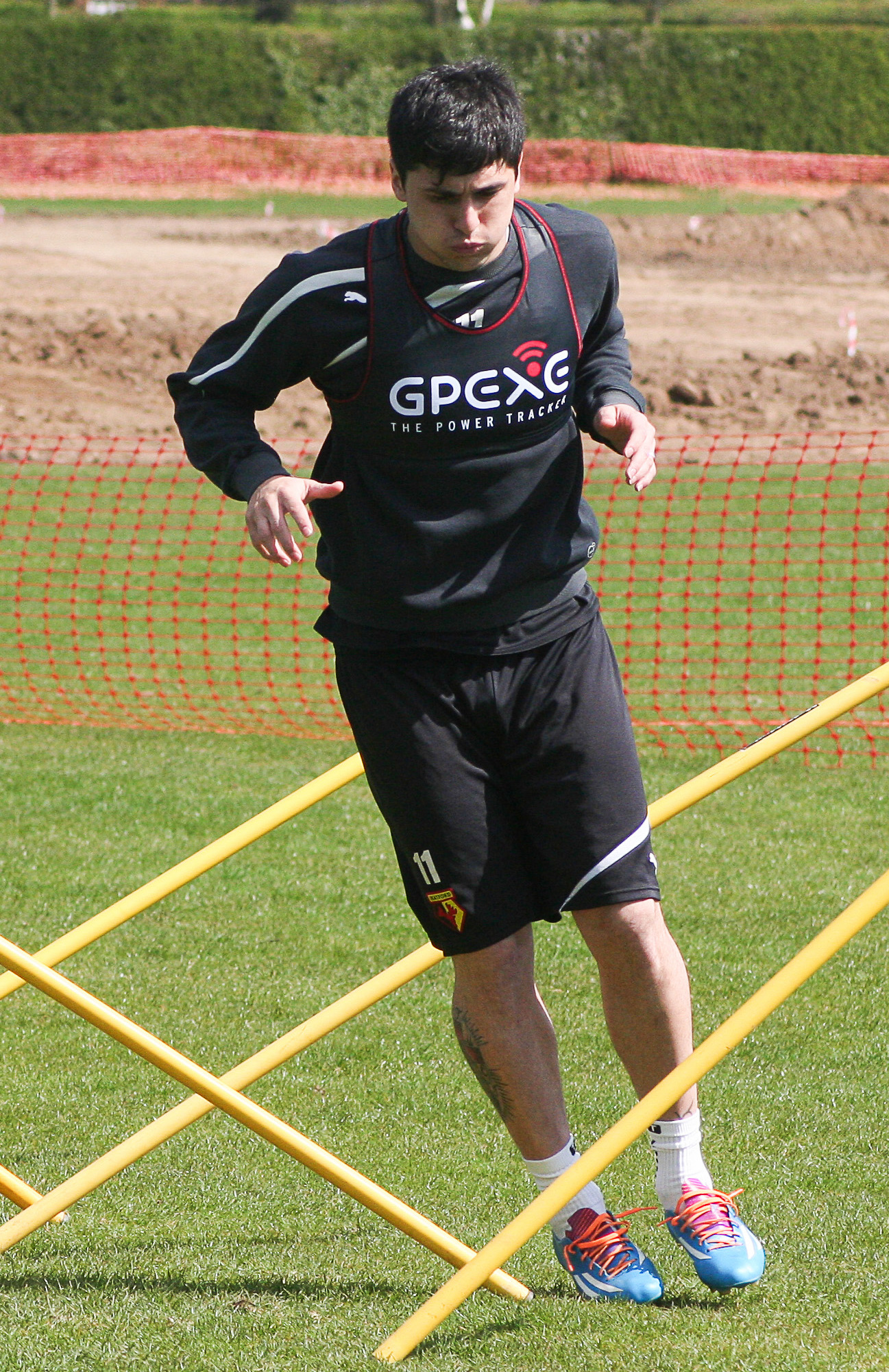
- Forestieri training at Watford in 2014

Personal information
- Full name: Fernando Martin Forestieri
- Date of birth: 15 January 1990 (age 36)
- Place of birth: Rosario, Argentina
- Height: 1.72 m (5 ft 8 in)
- Positions: Forward; winger

Team information
- Current team: Oxford City
- Number: 15

Youth career
- 2003: Newell's Old Boys
- 2003–2006: Boca Juniors

Senior career*
Years	Team	Apps	(Gls)
2006	Genoa	1	(1)
2007–2009	Siena	19	(1)
2009–2010	Vicenza	19	(5)
2010–2011	Málaga	19	(1)
2011	Empoli	19	(3)
2011–2012	Bari	28	(2)
2012–2015	Watford	80	(20)
2015–2020	Sheffield Wednesday	128	(40)
2020–2022	Udinese	23	(3)
2022–2024	Johor Darul Ta'zim	32	(30)
2025–2026	AEL Limassol	24	(2)
2026–	Oxford City	4	(0)

International career
2006–2007	Italy U17	8	(5)
2007–2008	Italy U19	14	(4)
2008–2010	Italy U20	2	(0)
2011–2012	Italy U21	2	(0)
2010–2015	Italy	6	(1)
- * Club domestic league appearances and goals as of 6 November 2026

Fernando Martin Forestieri (born 15 January 1990) is a professional footballer who plays as a winger for National League North club Oxford City.

== Club career ==
Born in Rosario, Argentina, to Italian parents, Forestieri's career began in 2003 with Newell's Old Boys. Later on that year, when he was just 13, Boca Juniors made contract with Forestieri for $50,000. With his parents returning home, Forestieri left Boca to join Genoa at the age of 16.

=== Genoa ===
In January 2006, Genoa signed Forestieri on a three-year contract. Boca tried to keep the young player, but failed to do so. In March, Boca contested the regularity of the transfer and, refusing a €300,000 indemnification from Genoa, the Argentine club submitted the case to the AFA. That summer he played some friendly matches with Genoa, and in one of them Torino president Urbano Cairo saw Forestieri in action and offered €500,000 for him, but Genoa refused.

On 8 November 2006, Forestieri made his official debut with Genoa in a Coppa Italia loss against Empoli. Forestieri made his Serie B league debut on 13 January 2007, on an away match lost 2–1 to Pescara, by scoring for Genoa. He then played as a regular with the Genoa Primavera youth team that won the 2007 International Viareggio trophy.

On 25 July 2007, Siena announced that they had signed Forestieri from Genoa in a co-ownership deal, for €1.7 million, to compensate the transfer debt to Siena involving the transfers of Andrea Masiello and Abdoulay Konko to Genoa. He made his Serie A debut on 26 September, coming off the bench in a match against Atalanta. On 13 January 2008, Forestieri scored his first goal for Siena after being brought on as a substitute against Internazionale in a 3–2 loss.

On 25 June 2008, Genoa acquired the entirety of his transfer rights for €4.5 million (with Siena acquiring half of Manuel Coppola for €1.5 million and the full rights of Abdelkader Ghezzal for €3.5 million), successively loaning him out to Siena for another season, but in the first part of the season with coach Giampaolo he played only in two games.

In January 2009, he was loaned to Vicenza in Serie B, where he scored 5 goals in 19 appearances.

=== Udinese ===
In July 2009 Forestieri agreed for a move to La Liga, joining Málaga on loan from Genoa and Udinese. He was sold to Udinese Calcio in co-ownership deal on 28 July, for €1.5million. He scored his only goal for the club on 20 December 2009 in 2–1 win against Mallorca.

In summer 2010 he failed to find a new club and stayed at Udinese's youth team. Udinese held some club friendlies for players pending to leave, credited the team as Udinese B. He failed to leave the club and played for Udinese's Primavera youth team.

In January 2011 he had been sent to Serie B club Empoli.

On 15 July 2011 he was signed by newly relegated Serie B team Bari along with Zdeněk Zlámal., which Udinese bought him outright from Genoa on 7 July. He would be a potential replacement of Paulo Vitor Barreto who was bought back by Udinese in June.

=== Watford ===
On 31 August 2012, Watford signed Forestieri on loan from Udinese. He scored his first goal against Huddersfield Town on 29 September and then got sent off three days later against Charlton Athletic. Watford goalkeeper Manuel Almunia has claimed to see likenesses to Lionel Messi and says he has a bright future, but must avoid getting involved with referees. Forestieri scored his second Watford goal against Leicester City in November which proved to be the decider as Watford emerged as 2–1 winners.

On 14 January 2013, the striker signed a permanent five-and-a-half-year deal with the club. Forestieri scored his first goals as a permanent Watford player against Sheffield Wednesday on 5 March 2013 – netting a brace at Vicarage Road in an emotional 2–1 win where Forestieri was spotted crying and kissing the Watford badge after the final whistle, and three weeks later Forestieri scored another brace, this time against Burnley on 29 March 2013.

On May 12, 2013, Forestieri was involved in one of the most memorable football moments of the 21st century, playing a part in Troy Deeney's last-minute winner against Leicester City that sent Watford to the Championship Playoff Final after Almunia had saved a penalty just seconds before. Forestieri clipped a cross from the right wing to the back post, where Jonathan Hogg headed it into the path of Deeney, whose thundering finish cued a pitch invasion.

=== Sheffield Wednesday ===
After a below par 2014–15 season (despite winning promotion to Premier League) with Watford, scoring only 5 goals in 25 games, mixed with the combination of constant manager changes, Forestieri found himself sliding down the pecking order at Vicarage Road. Forestieri found himself subject to immense interest from clubs in the Championship including Leeds, Reading and Sheffield Wednesday. On 29 August 2015 Sheffield Wednesday completed the signing of Forestieri on a four-year deal, for an undisclosed fee believed to be around £3,000,000. He became the 14th summer signing by the Owls, and the 3rd to move from Vicarage Road to Hillsborough along with Lewis McGugan and Daniel Pudil. He made his Owls debut in the 3–1 away defeat to Burnley on 12 September. He was Wednesday's top goalscorer with 15 in all competitions.

Forestieri won the Player of the Year award at the end of the 2015–16 season. On 9 January 2017, Forestieri extended his contract with Sheffield Wednesday by a further year, committing until the summer of 2020. On 24 June 2020, it was announced that he had declined a new contract and would be leaving the club on the 30 June.

=== Return to Udinese ===
On 8 September 2020, Forestieri agreed a return to Udinese on a two-year deal. During the 2021–22 season Forestieri played 6 times, scoring 2 goals and providing 1 assist. After limited opportunities and despite an outstanding free kick goal for Udinese in November 2021 against Torino Fernando was released from his Udinese contract by mutual consent in December 2021. Fernando had scored 4 goals in 27 games during his second spell at the club.

=== Johor Darul Ta'zim ===
In January 2022, Forestieri left Udinese and headed to Asia, joining Malaysian giants Johor Darul Ta'zim on a two-year contract. He won his first ever trophy in club football shortly after, when JDT defeated Kuala Lumpur City 3–0 to win the Piala Sumbangsih (Charity Shield), with one of the goals scored by Forestieri on his debut. On 13 March 2022 he scored his first hat-trick for the club in a Malaysia FA Cup match against BRM F.C. where JDT won 10–0. On 11 May 2022, during the match against Negeri Sembilan, Forestieri helped JDT secure 3 points, scoring a 90+10' wonder goal on what seemed to be the last touch of the match.

Forestieri renewed his contract with the club on 6 February 2024 ahead of the 2024–25 Malaysia Super League season.

=== Oxford City ===
On 2 October 2026, Forestieri returned to England, joining National League North club Oxford City.

== International career ==
After declining a call-up to the Argentina under-17 team, Forestieri was called up by Italy for its U-17, U-19 and U-20 football teams. On 13 April 2011 he made his debut with the Italy U-21 team in a friendly game against Russia.

== Style of play ==
A technical and flexible player, he is a trequartista, but he can act as a second striker or as an outside forward in a 4–3–3. He is quick. Throughout his career he has developed an ability to adapt to playing in different roles. He has also been seen playing as a trequartista, a winger on both sides, and occasionally as a forward, making him an offensive wild card. With a low centre of gravity, he is able to slip easily in one-on-one situations. For this reason, the coach Jos Luhukay in his seasons at Sheffield Wednesday, often played him as a right winger in a 4-2-3-1 or as a wide midfielder in a 4–4–2. Thus, abandoning his initial deployment in central roles with a few exceptions, he is sometimes deployed as a second forward in a 4-4-2 to act as a link around a physical centre forward.

== Legal issues ==
Forestieri was accused of racially abusing opposition player Krystian Pearce in a pre-season friendly. He was charged by police, and on 28 December 2018, an arrest warrant was issued after Forestieri failed to attend court. He was found not guilty by a court in March 2019, but was charged with racial abuse by the Football Association. The FA found him guilty and issued a six-game ban, which he said he intended to appeal.

== Career statistics ==
As of match played 15 June 2024

Appearances and goals by club, season and competition
Club	Season	League			National cup (Note: Includes Coppa Italia, Copa del Rey, FA Cup, Malaysia FA Cup)		League cup (Note: Includes Football League Cup, Malaysia Cup)		Continental		Other		Total	
Club	Season	Division	Apps	Goals	Apps	Goals	Apps	Goals	Apps	Goals	Apps	Goals	Apps	Goals
Genoa	2006–07	Serie B	1	1	0	0	—		—		—		1	1
Siena	2007–08	Serie A	17	1	0	0	—		—		—		17	1
Siena	2008–09	Serie A	2	0	0	0	—		—		—		2	0
Siena	Total		20	2	0	0	—		—		—		20	2
Vicenza	2008–09	Serie B	19	5	0	0	—		—		—		19	5
Málaga	2009–10	La Liga	19	1	1	0	—		—		—		20	1
Udinese	2010–11	Serie A	0	0	1	0	—		—		—		1	0
Empoli	2010–11	Serie B	19	3	0	0	—		—		—		19	3
Bari	2011–12	Serie B	28	2	2	0	—		—		—		30	2
Watford	2012–13	Championship	14	3	1	0	0	0	—		—		15	3
Watford	2012–13	Championship	14	5	0	0	0	0	—		3 (Note: Appearances in Championship play-offs)	0	17	5
Watford	2013–14	Championship	28	7	2	1	2	0	—		—		32	8
Watford	2014–15	Championship	24	5	1	0	1	0	—		—		26	5
Watford	2015–16	Premier League	0	0	0	0	1	0	—		—		1	0
Watford	Total		165	31	8	1	4	0	—		3	0	180	32
Sheffield Wednesday	2015–16	Championship	39	15	0	0	0	0	—		—		39	15
Sheffield Wednesday	2016–17	Championship	37	12	1	0	0	0	—		—		38	12
Sheffield Wednesday	2017–18	Championship	10	5	0	0	1	0	—		—		11	5
Sheffield Wednesday	2018–19	Championship	25	6	1	0	1	0	—		—		27	6
Sheffield Wednesday	2019–20	Championship	17	2	1	0	1	0	—		—		19	2
Sheffield Wednesday	Total		128	40	3	0	3	0	—		—		134	40
Udinese	2020–21	Serie A	19	1	2	1	—		—		—		21	2
Udinese	2021–22	Serie A	4	2	2	0	—		—		—		6	2
Udinese	Total		23	3	4	1	—		—		—		27	4
Johor Darul Ta'zim	2022	Malaysia Super League	18	13	4	3	7	4	6 (Note: Appearances in AFC Champions League)	1	1 (Note: Appearance in Piala Sumbangsih)	1	36	22
Johor Darul Ta'zim	2023	Malaysia Super League	20	19	3	1	2	2	5	0	1	0	31	22
Johor Darul Ta'zim	2024–25	Malaysia Super League	2	2	1	1	0	0	0	0	0	0	3	3
Johor Darul Ta'zim	Total		40	34	8	5	9	6	11	1	2	1	70	47
Career total			376	110	23	7	16	6	11	1	5	1	431	125

== Honours ==
Johor Darul Ta'zim

- Malaysia Super League: 2022, 2023
- Malaysia FA Cup: 2022, 2023, 2024
- Malaysia Cup: 2022, 2023
- Malaysia Charity Shield: 2022, 2023, 2024

Individual

- PFA Fans' Player of the Month Award: March 2016
- Malaysia FA Cup Top Scorer: 2022
