= Daniel Pudil =

Czech footballer (born 1985)

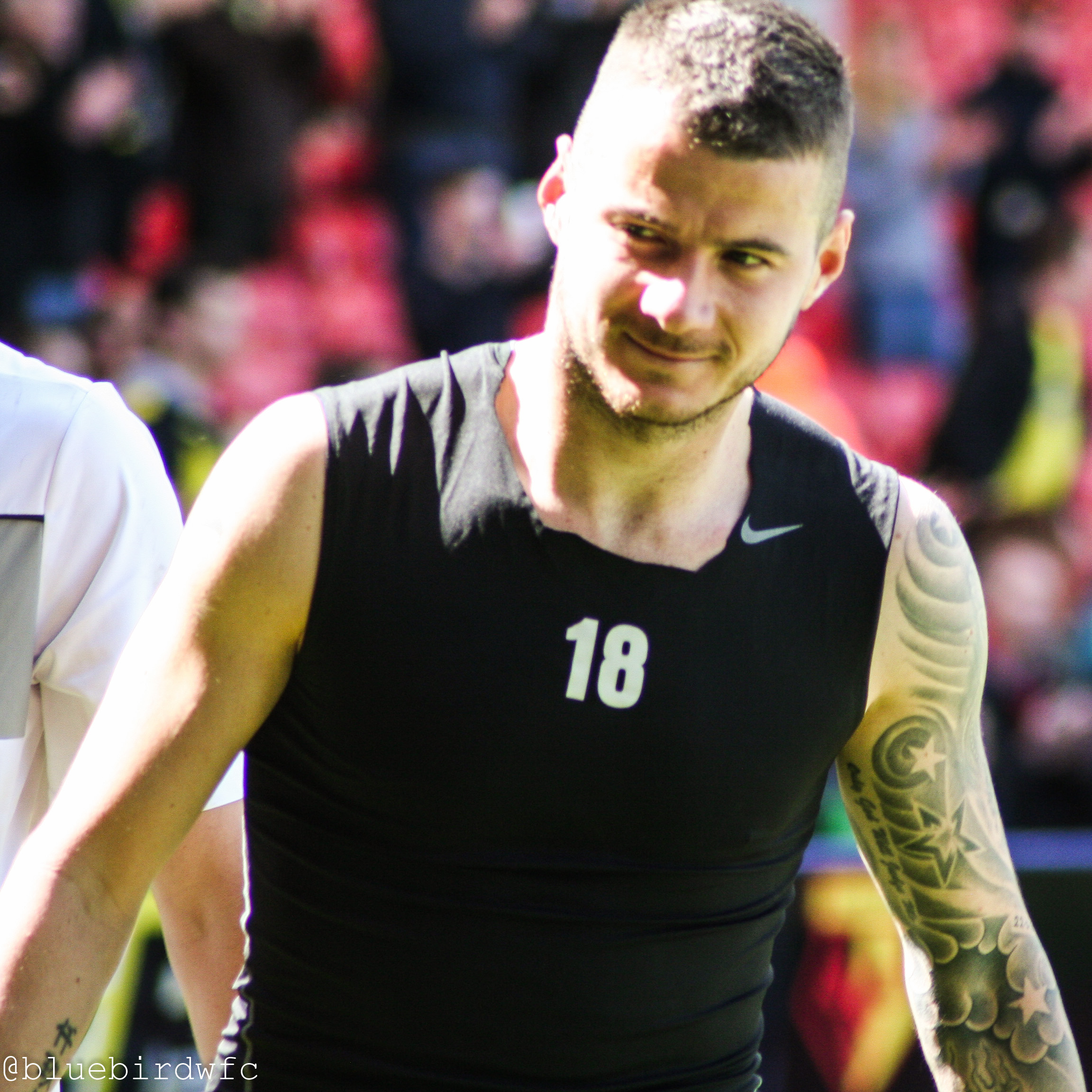

Personal information
- Full name: Daniel Pudil
- Date of birth: 27 September 1985 (age 41)
- Place of birth: Prague, Czechoslovakia
- Height: 1.83 m (6 ft 0 in)
- Positions: Left back; left winger

Team information
- Current team: Hallam

Youth career
- 1991–2003: Sparta Prague

Senior career*
Years	Team	Apps	(Gls)
2003–2004	Chmel Blšany	11	(2)
2004–2008	Slovan Liberec	70	(7)
2007–2008	→ Slavia Prague (loan)	21	(6)
2008–2011	Genk	121	(4)
2012–2013	Granada	0	(0)
2012	→ Cesena (loan)	7	(1)
2012–2013	→ Watford (loan)	37	(1)
2013–2016	Watford	60	(2)
2015–2016	→ Sheffield Wednesday (loan)	35	(2)
2016–2019	Sheffield Wednesday	66	(2)
2019–2020	Mladá Boleslav	23	(0)
2020–2021	Viktoria Žižkov	23	(0)
2022–	Hallam	24	(3)

International career
2004	Czech Republic U19	5	(0)
2004–2007	Czech Republic U21	12	(1)
2007–2016	Czech Republic	35	(2)
- * Club domestic league appearances and goals as of 14:50, 11 March 2020 (UTC)

Daniel Pudil (Czech pronunciation: [ˈdanɪjɛl ˈpuɟɪl]; born 27 September 1985) is a Czech former professional footballer who played for the Czech Republic national team and currently plays as a left back or left winger for Northern Counties East League Premier Division club Hallam.

== Club career ==
=== Czech Republic ===
Pudil started his youth career in the Czech Republic with Sparta Prague. He left the club aged 18 and joined FK Chmel Blšany. At Chmel Blšany Pudil used to play left back in defence and scored two goals in eleven appearances. After six months Pudil joined FC Slovan Liberec. Though making twelve appearances in his first season, Pudil soon became a member of the first team which would win its second league title with Pudil making 29 appearances and scoring three goals. During the season, Pudil scored the first goal of his career in a 2–2 draw against Příbram on 7 November 2005. Throughout the season, Pudil would establish himself in the starting eleven at the club.

In 2007, he had a trial with English side Watford, but manager Aidy Boothroyd decided not to sign Pudil on a permanent contract.

In the 2007–08 season in which he played three games for Slovan Liberec, Pudil left Liberec to join SK Slavia Praha on loan for a season and made his debut on 15 September 2007, in a 0–0 draw against Baník Ostrava; Four days later, he made his Champions League debut in a 2–1 win over Romanian side Steaua București. On 29 September 2007, Pudil then scored his first goal in a 7–1 win over Fastav Zlín; followed four days later when he scored his first goal in a 2–1 loss against Sevilla and his second league goal came in a 2–0 win over Sparta Prague six days later. In the UEFA Champions League third match in the group stage, Pudil was in the squad when Arsenal thrashed Slavia 7–0. Six days later after the 7–0 loss, Pudil played against his former club in a 1–1 draw; but the next meeting soon happened again six months later, when Pudil set up a goal for Zdeněk Šenkeřík, to score the only goal in the game. Following Slavia Praha's Champions League elimination to UEFA Cup, Pudil set up a goal for Matej Krajčík to make it 1–1 against Tottenham Hotspur in the second leg. However, Slavia Praha lost 3–1 on aggregate, having lost against them in the first leg. On the final game of the season, Pudil scored in a 2–2 draw against Baumit Jablonec. At the end of the season, Slavia Praha won the league title. Due to his flamboyance and controversial lifestyle, Slavia Praha had decided against signing Pudil.

=== Genk ===
Pudil signed for Belgian club KRC Genk from FC Slovan Liberec in July 2008, after interest from Italian sides Reggina and Lecce. On the opening game of the season on 17 August 2008, Pudil made his debut for the club in a 1–1 draw against Beerschot; then two appearances later, Pudil scored his first goal in a 3–1 win over Zulte Waregem on 14 September 2008. However the next game, Pudil received a red card after a second bookable offence in a 1–0 loss against Club Brugge. In his first season, Pudil scored four goals in twenty nine appearances. At Genk, Pudil had established himself in the first team during his three seasons at Genk. The next season with Pudil made 27 appearance. However, in the Europa League fourth round second leg against Lille, having loss 2–1 in the first leg, Pudil set up a goal for Elyaniv Barda but received a red card after a second bookable offence. The next season, Pudil was involved in the squad with Genk that won the title for the second time.

He spent three seasons with the Belgian side before joining Granada on a five-and-a-half-year contract in January 2012.

=== Cesena ===
After joining Granada, Pudil was immediately loaned out to Cesena for the rest of the 2011–12 season. On 1 February 2012, Pudil made his debut, playing in defensive midfield, in a 0–0 draw against Napoli. Eighteen days later after making his debut, Pudil scored his first goal in a 3–1 loss against A.C. Milan. On 7 March 2012, the match didn't turn well for him when he received a red card after a second bookable offence, just one minute after receiving a yellow in a 0–0 draw against Catania. At the end of the season, Pudil couldn't help Cesena retain their Serie A status as the club was relegated to Serie B.

=== Watford ===
Pudil then joined Watford on a season-long loan for the 2012–13 season, joining Czech teammate Matěj Vydra. In pre-season, Pudil played his first match in a friendly against Tottenham Hotspur in Lloyd Doyley's testimonial match but after playing five minutes, he came off with a suspected hamstring injury. This turned out to be a minor injury. Pudil made his Watford debut, in the second game of the season, a 1–0 loss against Ipswich Town.

Having played as a left back for six games, Pudil was slotted into the left midfield role and assisted several goals. On 23 October 2012, Pudil received a straight red card in a 2–1 loss against Cardiff City after violent conduct against Craig Noone. After the game, Watford appealed the decision, with support from Cardiff City and Noone himself. His three-game suspension was thus reduced to one by the FA. In the first match of 2013, Pudil scored his first goal for Watford in a 4–3 loss against Charlton Athletic. Later in the 2012–13 season, Pudil would go on to make 40 appearances in all competitions, and at the end of the season, Pudil would return to Granada, as his loan spell with Watford came to an end.

On 4 July 2013, Pudil announced via Twitter that he had joined Watford permanently from Granada, signing a four-year contract. Pudil's first game after signing for the club on a permanent basis came after coming on for Ikechi Anya in the 75th minute, in the opening game of the season, in a 1–0 win over Birmingham City, while his first goal would come in a 1–1 draw against Charlton Athletic on 14 September 2013.

=== Sheffield Wednesday ===
On 29 August 2015, Pudil signed for Sheffield Wednesday on a season-long loan deal. He scored his first goal for Sheffield Wednesday in a 3–1 win over Preston North End on 3 October 2015. Pudil completed a permanent move to Wednesday on 28 July 2016 for £1,500,000. He signed a new one-year deal with the club in May 2018. He was released by Sheffield Wednesday at the end of the 2018–19 season.

=== Mladá Boleslav ===
After his release from Sheffield Wednesday in July 2019, he signed for Czech side Mladá Boleslav on a two-year deal.

=== Viktoria Žižkov ===
Pudil signed for Czech side Viktoria Žižkov on a one-year deal for free.

=== Hallam ===
On 24 July 2022, Pudil returned to Sheffield and signed for Northern Counties East League Premier Division side Hallam - the second oldest football club in the world.

== International career ==
Pudil represented his country at under-19 and under-21 level. He made his senior debut in 2007 and scored his first goal at this level on 21 November 2007 in a 0–2 away victory against Cyprus in a UEFA Euro 2008 qualifier. Pudil was a member of the Czech Republic squad that competed in UEFA Euro 2016.

== Coaching career ==
In July 2022, Pudil began working for the Sheffield Wednesday Community Programme to help coach their college BTEC football side. He combined this role while playing part-time for Hallam.

== Career statistics ==
=== Club ===
As of match played 17 February 2018

Appearances and goals by club, season and competition
Club	Season	League			Domestic Cup		League Cup		Continental		Other		Total	
Club	Season	Division	Apps	Goals	Apps	Goals	Apps	Goals	Apps	Goals	Apps	Goals	Apps	Goals
Chmel Blšany	2003–04	Czech First League	11	2	—		—		—		—		11	2
Slovan Liberec	2004–05	Czech First League	12	0	—		—		—		—		12	0
Slovan Liberec	2005–06	Czech First League	29	3	—		—		—		—		29	3
Slovan Liberec	2006–07	Czech First League	26	4	—		—		2 (Note: Appearances in the Champions League)	0	—		28	4
Slovan Liberec	2007–08	Czech First League	3	0	—		—		—		—		3	0
Slovan Liberec	Total		70	7	—		—		2	0	—		72	7
Slavia Prague (loan)	2007–08	Czech First League	21	6	—		—		6	1	—		27	7
Genk	2008–09	Belgian First Division	29	4	0	0	—		—		—		29	4
Genk	2009–10	Pro League	37	0	2	0	—		2 (Note: Appearances in the Europa League)	0	1 (Note: Appearances in the Belgian Super Cup)	0	42	0
Genk	2010-11	Pro League	37	0	1	0	—		2	0	—		40	0
Genk	2011–12	Pro League	18	0	2	0	—		9	0	1	0	30	0
Genk	Total		121	4	5	0	—		13	0	2	0	141	4
Granada	2011–12	La Liga	0	0	0	0	—		—		—		0	0
Cesena (loan)	2011–12	Serie A	7	1	0	0	—		—		—		7	1
Watford (loan)	2012–13	Championship	37	1	1	0	0	0	—		2 (Note: Appearances in the Championship play-offs)	0	40	1
Watford	2013–14	Championship	37	2	2	0	3	0	—		—		42	2
Watford	2014–15	Championship	23	0	1	0	2	0	—		—		26	0
Watford	Total		97	3	4	0	5	0	—		2	0	108	3
Sheffield Wednesday (loan)	2015–16	Championship	36	2	1	0	2	0	—		3	0	42	2
Sheffield Wednesday	2016–17	Championship	26	2	1	0	0	0	—		2	0	29	2
Sheffield Wednesday	2017–18	Championship	17	0	2	0	2	0	—		0	0	21	0
Sheffield Wednesday	Total		79	4	4	2	4	0	—		5	0	92	4
Career total			406	27	13	0	9	0	21	1	9	0	458	28

=== International ===
As of match played 16 November 2018

National team	Year	Apps	Goals
Czech Republic	2007	3	1
Czech Republic	2008	0	0
Czech Republic	2009	7	1
Czech Republic	2010	6	0
Czech Republic	2011	6	0
Czech Republic	2012	1	0
Czech Republic	2013	0	0
Czech Republic	2014	4	0
Czech Republic	2015	2	0
Czech Republic	2016	6	0
Total		35	2

== Honours ==
Genk

- Belgian Cup: 2008–09
- Belgian Pro League: 2010–11
- Belgian Super Cup: 2011
