= Carl Stewart (footballer) =

English footballer (born 1997)

Personal information
- Full name: Carl Leon Stewart
- Date of birth: 2 May 1997 (age 29)
- Place of birth: Hammersmith, England
- Height: 1.74 m (5 ft 8 1/2 in)
- Position: Midfielder

Team information
- Current team: Harefield United

Youth career
- 2006–2015: Watford
- 2015: Udinese
- 2015–2017: Watford

Senior career*
| Years | Team | Apps | (Gls) |
| 2017–2018 | Watford | 0 | (0) |
| 2018 | Oxford City | 2 | (0) |
| 2018 | Banbury United | | |
| 2018 | Bedfont Sports | | |
| 2018–2019 | Wingate & Finchley | | |
| 2019–2020 | Zaglebie Sosnowiec | 5 | (0) |
| 2020 | → Piast Żmigród (loan) | 1 | (0) |
| 2020–2021 | Marlow | 1 | (1) |
| 2021 | Rayners Lane | 0 | (0) |
| 2021–2022 | Beaconsfield Town | 6 | (0) |
| 2021–2022 | → Northwood (dual-reg) | 22 | (1) |
| 2022–2024 | Northwood | 72 | (2) |
| 2024–2025 | Harrow Borough | 34 | (1) |
| 2025–2026 | Northwood | 29 | (0) |
| 2026 | Risborough Rangers | 8 | (0) |
| 2026– | Harefield United | 2 | (0) |
- * Club domestic league appearances and goals as of 14:42, 9 August 2026 (UTC)

Carl Leon Stewart (born 2 May 1997) is an English professional footballer who currently plays as a midfielder for Combined Counties Football League side Harefield United.

== Career ==
A graduate of the Watford youth system, Stewart spent half a season in Italy with the youth team of Udinese in 2015, before returning to Watford. He made his competitive debut for Watford on 7 January 2017 in their 2–0 home FA Cup victory against Burton Albion, coming on as a 97th minute substitute for Jerome Sinclair.

In April 2018, Watford announced that Stewart would be released at the conclusion of his contract in June 2018.

In August 2018 Stewart signed for National League South side Oxford City. After two league appearances, he joined Banbury United in October 2018 before having spells with Bedfont Sports and Wingate & Finchley.

On 12 July 2019, Stewart joined Polish I liga side Zaglebie Sosnowiec on a two-year deal. In February 2020, Stewart joined III liga side Piast Żmigród on loan until the end of the season.

Stewart returned to England and joined Isthmian League side Marlow in October 2020.

After a short spell at Rayners Lane, Stewart joined Southern League Premier Division South side Beaconsfield Town in 2021.

In November 2021, Stewart joined Northwood - initially on dual-registration from Beaconsfield before making the move permanent in the summer of 2022.

Stewart remained with Northwood until the end of the 2023–24 season, but was one of a number of Northwood players who followed manager Ben Bukowski to Harrow Borough in the summer of 2024.

Following just one season with Harrow Borough, Stewart returned to Northwood in June 2025. Stewart passed 150 appearances for the club, but departed in February 2026 when a new management team arrived.

Stewart then teamed up with his former manager Gary Meakin at Spartan South Midlands Premier Division side Risborough Rangers.

For the 2026-27 season, Stewart joined Combined Counties Football League side Harefield United.
