= Ikechi Anya =

Scottish association football player

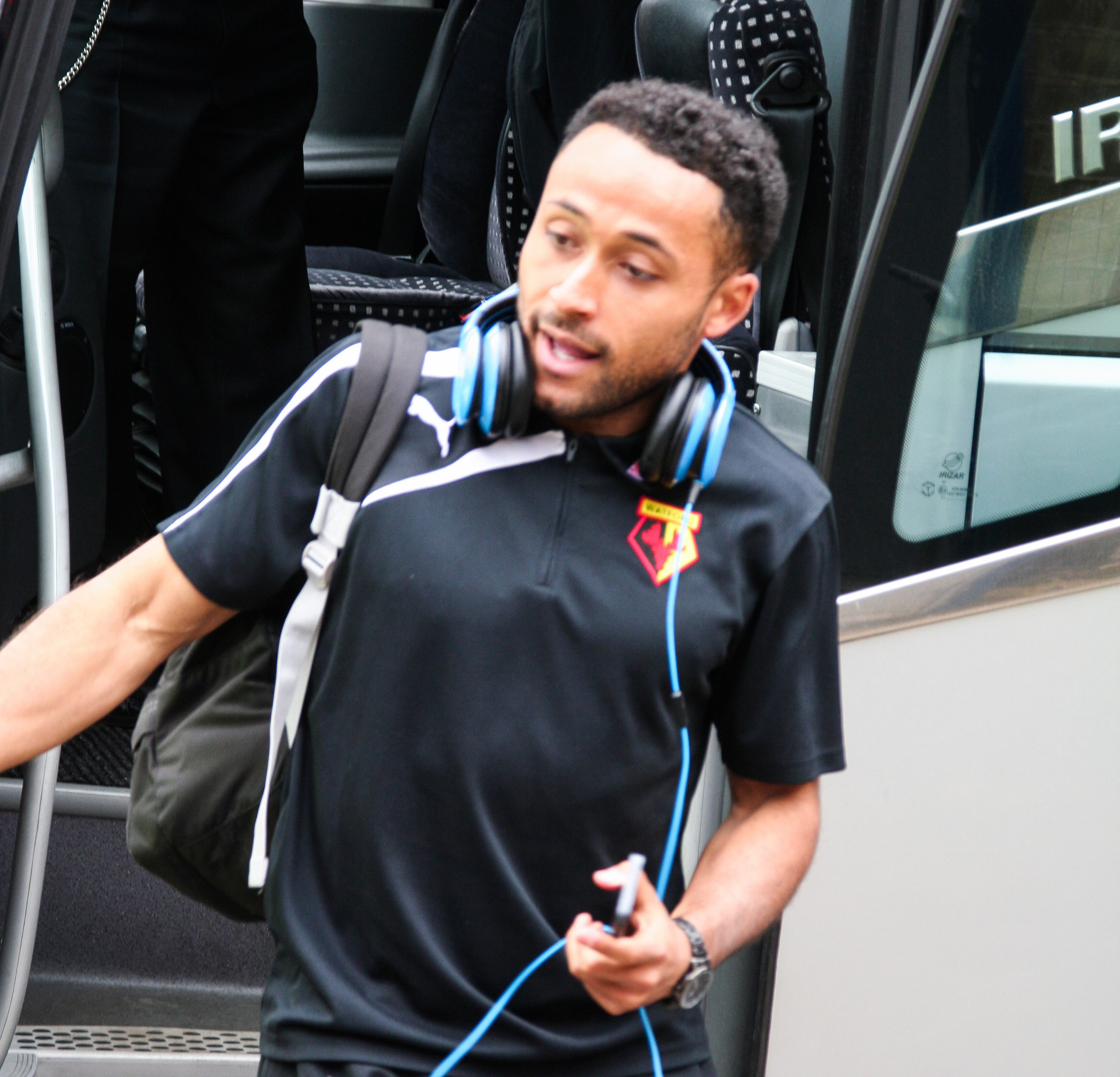
- Anya with Watford in 2014

Personal information
- Full name: Ikechi Anya
- Date of birth: 3 January 1988 (age 38)
- Place of birth: Glasgow, Scotland
- Height: 5 ft 6 in (1.68 m)
- Position: Midfielder

Youth career
- 2002–2003: Oxford United
- 2003–2004: Wycombe Wanderers

Senior career*
Years	Team	Apps	(Gls)
2004–2007	Wycombe Wanderers	18	(0)
2007–2008	Oxford City	17	(4)
2008	Halesowen Town	17	(0)
2009	Northampton Town	14	(3)
2009–2010	Sevilla Atlético	22	(0)
2010–2011	Celta B	35	(8)
2011	Celta	1	(0)
2011–2013	Granada	0	(0)
2011–2012	→ Cádiz (loan)	29	(4)
2012–2013	→ Watford (loan)	25	(3)
2013–2016	Watford	99	(5)
2016–2020	Derby County	35	(1)
Total		315	(28)

International career^{‡}
2013–2017	Scotland	29	(3)
- * Club domestic league appearances and goals as of 17:44, 24 January 2020 (UTC) ‡ National team caps and goals as of 14 October 2021

Ikechi Anya (born 3 January 1988) is a Scottish former professional footballer. A versatile player, Anya was fielded in a number of positions, including winger, wing-back and full-back.

He played for Wycombe Wanderers, Northampton Town, Watford and Derby County in England, as well as for Spanish clubs Celta de Vigo, Sevilla Atlético and Granada. Eligible to also represent Romania, Nigeria or England, he chose to play for the country of his birth, Scotland. Anya made 29 international appearances between 2013 and 2017, scoring three goals.

== Early life ==
Anya's father is a Nigerian research scientist of the Igbo ethnic group and his mother a Romanian economist. The couple met while studying in Bucharest. After finishing their studies, his parents moved to Scotland in the late 1980s for his father to obtain his doctorate in metallurgy.

Anya was born in Glasgow, Scotland and spent his early childhood in the Castlemilk area. His mother, Mariana, states that as a very young boy Anya "was kicking a ball in front of the house where he grew up in Glasgow from morning till night." The family moved to Oxford when he was seven years old after his father got a job at the University of Oxford. Anya maintained his fondness for Scotland, stating that whenever Scotland played England he would cheer "Come on Scotland".

His older brother, Chima, is a medical doctor.

== Club career ==
=== Wycombe Wanderers ===
Anya joined the Wycombe Wanderers youth team in the 2003–04 season, having been released by Oxford United.

His performances in the youth team ensured that he was well talked about within the club, enough that he was given the number 28 shirt by then manager Tony Adams for the match at Southend United on 11 September 2004, becoming the club's youngest ever player at the age of 16.

Like Russell Martin, he committed his short-term future to the club, signing a two-year deal in June 2005 and whilst at Wycombe won Apprentice of the Year at the inaugural Football League Awards in 2006.

=== Non-League ===
He was released in the summer of 2007 and signed for Oxford City, before being snapped up in January 2008 by Halesowen Town. In the summer of 2008 he joined the Glenn Hoddle Academy and his contract expired in the summer of 2010.

=== Northampton Town ===
On 28 February 2009, Anya signed for League One side Northampton Town. He made his debut as coming on as a substitute in the game away to Cheltenham Town on the same day. His first goal for the club came as part of a 3–4 defeat against Swindon Town on 24 March. His second goal came in the 92nd minute of the 3–1 victory at Leyton Orient, his goal wrapping up a victory in the fight against relegation for Northampton which they eventually lost.

=== Spain ===
Northampton manager Stuart Gray was keen to re-sign Anya on a long-term deal at the end of the season, but on 7 July 2009, he joined Sevilla Atlético, the reserve side of Sevilla, on a two-year contract.

Anya signed for Celta Vigo in July 2010 after his contract with the Glenn Hoddle Academy expired. On 13 July 2011, Anya signed a three-year contract with newly promoted La Liga side Granada. He was then loaned out to Cádiz for the season.

=== Watford ===
Anya was loaned to English side Watford for the 2012–13 season. He made his Watford debut as a substitute in the home defeat against Ipswich Town on 21 August 2012. He made his first start and scored his first goal for the club in the home defeat to Bradford City in the second round of the League Cup on 28 August 2012. Anya scored his first league goal for Watford against Blackpool in a 2–2 draw on 24 November 2012.

On 22 July 2013, Anya completed a permanent move to Watford, signing a three-year deal. He played a part in the promotion winning goal against Leicester, controlling a clearance in his own half and starting a counter attack which led to Troy Deeney’s goal, before extending his contract following Watford's promotion to the Premier League in 2015. He was contracted to the club until his move to Derby County on transfer deadline day in August 2016.

=== Derby County ===
On 31 August 2016, Anya signed a four-year contract with Derby County. Anya scored his first goal for the club in a 1–1 draw with Bristol City on 17 September 2016. Anya left Derby in June 2020.

== International career ==
Anya chose to play international football for Scotland, the land of his birth, but would also have been eligible for England (through residence), Nigeria (through his father) or Romania (through his mother). He received his first call up to the Scotland national team on 23 August 2013 for Scotland's World Cup qualifying double header in September against Belgium and Macedonia. He made his debut for Scotland against Belgium as a substitute on the hour mark on 6 September 2013 in a World Cup qualifying match, although Scotland were already unable to qualify for the final tournament. He made his first start and scored his first international goal in the following game, a 2–1 win in Macedonia on 10 September. On 7 September 2014 he scored against the world champions Germany in the first match of UEFA Euro 2016 qualification in Dortmund, Scotland lost 2–1.

== Career statistics ==
=== Club ===
As of match played 14 May 2018

Club	Season	League			FA Cup		League Cup		Other		Total	
Club	Season	Division	Apps	Goals	Apps	Goals	Apps	Goals	Apps	Goals	Apps	Goals
Wycombe Wanderers	2004–05	League Two	3	0	0	0	0	0	1	0	4	0
Wycombe Wanderers	2005–06	League Two	2	0	0	0	2	0	1	0	5	0
Wycombe Wanderers	2006–07	League Two	14	0	0	0	1	0	2	0	17	0
Wycombe Wanderers	Total		19	0	0	0	3	0	4	0	26	0
Northampton Town	2008–09	League Two	14	3	0	0	0	0	0	0	14	3
Sevilla Atlético	2009–10	Segunda División B	22	0	0	0	0	0	0	0	22	0
Celta B	2010–11	Segunda División B	35	8	0	0	0	0	0	0	35	8
Celta	2010–11	Segunda División	1	0	0	0	0	0	0	0	1	0
Granada	2011–12	La Liga	0	0	0	0	0	0	0	0	0	0
Cádiz (loan)	2011–12	Segunda División B	33	4	4	1	0	0	0	0	37	5
Watford	2012–13	Championship	25	3	0	0	1	1	3 (Note: Appearance(s) in Championship play-offs)	0	29	4
Watford	2013–14	Championship	35	5	2	0	1	0	0	0	38	5
Watford	2014–15	Championship	35	0	0	0	1	0	0	0	36	0
Watford	2015–16	Premier League	28	0	5	0	0	0	0	0	33	0
Watford	2016–17	Premier League	1	0	0	0	1	0	0	0	2	0
Watford	Total		124	8	7	0	4	1	3	0	138	9
Derby County	2016–17	Championship	26	1	1	0	0	0	0	0	27	1
Derby County	2017–18	Championship	7	0	0	0	2	0	2	0	11	0
Derby County	2018–19	Championship	0	0	0	0	0	0	0	0	0	0
Derby County	2019–20	Championship	0	0	0	0	0	0	0	0	0	0
Derby County	Total		33	1	1	0	2	0	2	0	38	1
Career total			281	24	12	1	9	1	9	0	311	26

=== International appearances ===
Scotland national team
Year	Apps	Goals
2013	4	1
2014	7	1
2015	6	0
2016	7	1
2017	2	0
Total	26	3

=== International goals ===
Goal	Date	Venue	Opponent	Score	Result	Competition
1.	10 September 2013	Philip II Arena, Skopje	North Macedonia	0–1	1–2	2014 World Cup qualification
2.	7 September 2014	Signal Iduna Park, Dortmund	Germany	1–1	2–1	EURO 2016 qualification
3.	24 March 2016	Generali Arena, Prague	Czech Republic	0–1	0–1	Friendly

== Honours ==
Individual

- SFWA International Player of the Year: 2014–15
