= Jean-Alain Fanchone =

French footballer (born 1988)

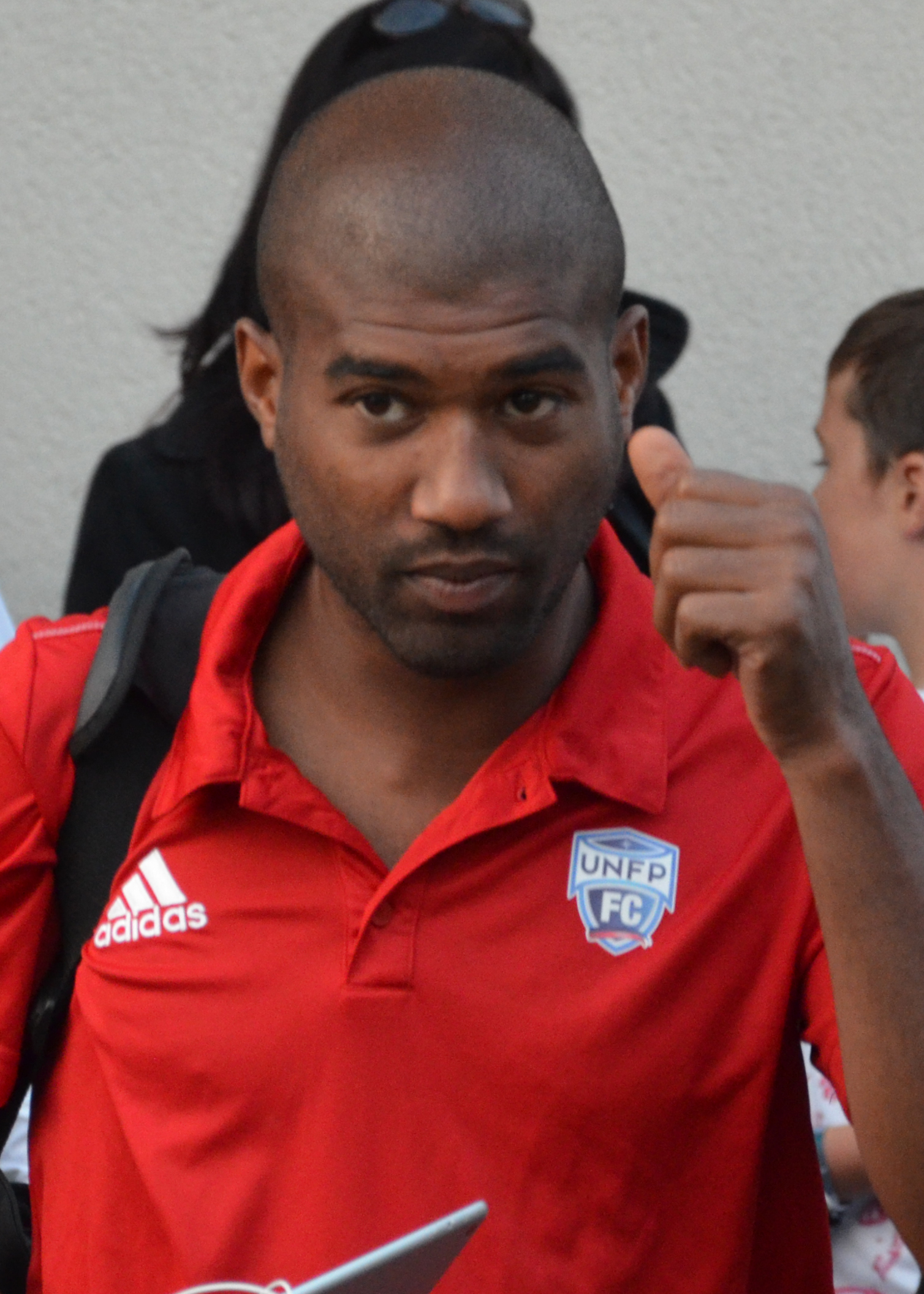
- Fanchone in 2016

Personal information
- Full name: Jean-Alain Andre Fanchone
- Date of birth: 2 September 1988 (age 38)
- Place of birth: Mulhouse, France
- Height: 1.75 m (5 ft 9 in)
- Position: Left-back

Youth career
- 2003–2008: Strasbourg

Senior career*
Years	Team	Apps	(Gls)
2008–2012	Strasbourg	61	(1)
2010–2011	→ Arles-Avignon (loan)	21	(0)
2011–2014	Udinese	0	(0)
2012	→ Watford (loan)	1	(0)
2013–2014	→ Nîmes (loan)	35	(1)
2014–2015	Petrolul Ploiești	16	(0)
2015–2016	Brest	3	(0)
2015–2016	Brest II	8	(0)
2016–2017	ASPV Strasbourg	12	(0)
2017–2018	Schiltigheim	29	(0)
2018–2019	Haguenau	18	(0)
2019–2020	Schiltigheim	17	(1)

International career
2005–2006	France U18	1	(0)
2006–2007	France U19	5	(0)
- * Club domestic league appearances and goals as of 1 July 2020

Jean-Alain Andre Fanchone (born 2 September 1988) is a French professional footballer who plays as a left-back.

== Club career ==
Fanchone won the Coupe Gambardella with Strasbourg in 2006, defeating Karim Benzema's Lyon in the final. He signed his first professional contract in March 2008 with Strasbourg. He made his professional debut on 8 August 2008 during a Ligue 2 match at Dijon and was credited with an assist on that occasion.

In 2011, Fanchone joined Udinese. The following seasons he was loaned to Watford and Nîmes. In 2014, Fanchone was transferred to Petrolul Ploiești.

== International career ==
Born in metropolitan France, Fanchone is of Guadeloupean origin. He has been selected for France at the U18 and U19 level, taking part in the U19 European Championship in 2007.
