= 2014–15 Watford F.C. season =

English football team season

Watford F.C.
2014–15 season
- Chairman: Raffaele Riva
- Head coach: Beppe Sannino (until 31 August); Óscar García (from 2–29 September); Billy McKinlay (from 29 September-7 October); Slaviša Jokanović (from 7 October)
- Stadium: Vicarage Road
- Championship: 2nd (promoted)
- FA Cup: Third round
- League Cup: Second round
- Top goalscorer: League: Troy Deeney (21); All: Troy Deeney (21)
Home colours	Away colours

Watford Football Club is an English football club from Watford, Hertfordshire. They played the 2014–15 season in the Football League Championship, for the eighth consecutive season since relegation from the Premier League in 2006–07, securing promotion following a 2–0 win against Brighton & Hove Albion on 25 April 2015, after spending eight consecutive seasons in the Championship. The team's manager was Slaviša Jokanović.

== Competitions ==
=== Pre-season matches ===
8 July 2014	SV Feldkirchen	0–7	Watford	Bad Bleiberg, Austria
17:00 BST		Report	Abdi 16'; 20' (o.g.); Vydra 25'; Murray 42'; McGugan 58'; Forestieri 59'; Ranégie 85'	Stadium: TBA

12 July 2014	Watford	0–0	Rubin Kazan	Bad Bleiberg, Austria
18:00 BST		Report		Stadium: TBA

13 July 2014	Watford	0–0	Chemnitzer FC	Bad Bleiberg, Austria
17:00 BST		Report		Stadium: TBA

19 July 2014	Shrewsbury Town	2–2	Watford	New Meadow, Shrewsbury
15:00 BST	Vernon 83', 90+1'	Report	Battocchio 18'; Hoban 48'

30 July 2014	Coventry City	1–0	Watford	Borehamwood, England
19:30 BST	Tudgay 8'	Report		Stadium: Meadow Park

2 August 2014	Watford	2–2	Udinese	Watford, England
15:00 BST	McGugan 59'; Ranégie 81'	Report	Widmer 23'; Théréau 76'	Stadium: Vicarage Road; Attendance: 11,085

=== Championship ===
==== League table ====
Pos	Team	Pld	W	D	L	GF	GA	GD	Pts	Promotion, qualification or relegation
1	Bournemouth (C, P)	46	26	12	8	98	45	+53	90	Promotion to the Premier League
2	Watford (P)	46	27	8	11	91	50	+41	89	Promotion to the Premier League
3	Norwich City (O, P)	46	25	11	10	88	48	+40	86	Qualification for Championship play-offs
4	Middlesbrough	46	25	10	11	68	37	+31	85	Qualification for Championship play-offs
5	Brentford	46	23	9	14	78	59	+19	78	Qualification for Championship play-offs

Updated to match(es) played on 2 May 2015. Source: Sky Sports
Rules for classification: 1) Points; 2) Goal difference; 3) Number of goals scored
(C) Champions; (O) Play-off winners; (P) Promoted

=== League results summary ===
Overall								Home						Away					
Pld	W	D	L	GF	GA	GD	Pts	W	D	L	GF	GA	GD	W	D	L	GF	GA	GD
46	27	8	11	91	50	+41	89	14	4	5	48	22	+26	13	4	6	43	28	+15

Last updated: 6 April 2015.
Source: Football League

Round	1	2	3	4	5	6	7	8	9	10	11	12	13	14	15	16	17	18	19	20	21	22	23	24	25	26	27	28	29	30	31	32	33	34	35	36	37	38	39	40	41	42	43	44	45	46
Ground	H	A	A	H	H	A	A	H	A	H	H	A	H	H	A	H	A	A	H	A	H	A	H	A	A	H	H	A	H	A	A	H	H	A	H	A	H	A	H	A	H	A	A	H	A	H
Result	W	L	W	W	W	L	W	D	D	W	D	W	D	D	W	L	L	L	L	W	W	W	L	W	L	W	W	L	W	W	W	L	W	W	W	D	W	W	L	D	W	W	W	W	W	D
Position	2	12	7	2	2	4	2	4	4	3	3	1	2	2	1	3	5	7	7	6	6	6	6	5	6	6	6	6	6	5	5	6	6	4	3	3	2	1	2	4	3	3	3	1	1	2

Updated to match(es) played on 8 April 2015. Source: bbc.co.uk
A = Away; H = Home; W = Win; D = Draw; L = Loss

=== Matches ===
The fixtures for the 2014–15 season were announced on 18 June 2014 at 9am.

9 August 2014 1	Watford	3–0	Bolton Wanderers	Vicarage Road, Watford
15:00	Deeney 17'; Vydra 23'; Forestieri 80'	Report		Attendance: 15,546; Referee: Carl Boyeson

16 August 2014 2	Norwich City	3–0	Watford	Carrow Road, Norwich
15:00	Johnson 32'; Grabban 59'; Tettey 61'	Report	Ekstrand (red card) 3'	Attendance: 26,375 (1,470 Hornets); Referee: Paul Tierney

19 August 2014 3	Rotherham United	0–2	Watford	New York Stadium, Rotherham
19:45	Morgan (yellow card) 58'; Smallwood (yellow card) 83'	Report	Andrews (yellow card) 60'; Tamaș (yellow card) 71'; Dyer 74'; Munari 87'	Attendance: 9,361; Referee: David Webb

23 August 2014 4	Watford	4–1	Leeds United	Vicarage Road, Watford
15:00	Forestieri 20', 67'; Deeney 58' (pen.); Tőzsér 90+1'	Report	Tamaș 32' (o.g.); Bellusci (red card) 57'; Byram (red card) 90+3'	Attendance: 15,674 (1,975 away fans); Referee: James Linington

30 August 2014 5	Watford	4–2	Huddersfield Town	Vicarage Road, Watford
15:00	Deeney 12'; Abdi 54', 90+4'; Tamaș (yellow card) 60' (yellow-red card) 65'; Andrews 68'	Report	Bunn 48'; Wallace 63'	Attendance: 14,409 (897 away fans); Referee: Neil Swarbrick

13 September 2014 6	Charlton Athletic	1–0	Watford	The Valley, London
15:00	Buyens 3' (pen.)	Report		Attendance: 17,628 (3,199 Hornets); Referee: Andrew Madley

16 September 2014 7	Blackpool	0–1	Watford	Bloomfield Road, Blackpool
19:45		Report	Vydra 68' (pen.)	Attendance: 9,695; Referee: Scott Duncan

20 September 2014 8	Watford	1–1	AFC Bournemouth	Vicarage Road
12:15	Tőzsér (yellow card) 68'; Cathcart 83'; Forestieri (yellow card) 85'	Report	Arter 63', (yellow card) 70'; Cook (yellow card) 67'; Surman (yellow card) 68'; Elphick (yellow card) 90+1'	Attendance: 14,320; Referee: Oliver Langford

27 September 2014 9	Blackburn Rovers	2–2	Watford	Ewood Park, Blackburn
15:00	Gestede 46'; Cairney (yellow card) 73'; Tunnicliffe 77'	Report	Vydra 30', (yellow card) 61'; Tőzsér 41'; Gomes (yellow card) 57'; Angella (yellow card) 90+6'	Attendance: 14,084; Referee: Darren Drysdale

30 September 2014 10	Watford	2–1	Brentford	Vicarage Road, Watford
19:45	Pudil (yellow card) 26' (yellow-red card) 90+3'; Ighalo 42', (yellow card) 43'; Fabbrini (yellow card) 51'; Vydra 70'; Paredes (yellow card) 90+2'	Report	Tarkowski (yellow card) 43'; Douglas 57'; McCormack (yellow card) 90+5'	Attendance: 15,502 (1,931 Brentford fans); Referee: Graham Salisbury

4 October 2014 11	Watford	1–1	Brighton & Hove Albion	Vicarage Road, Watford
15:00	Doyley (yellow card) 30'; Tőzsér 53'; Vydra (yellow card) 58'; Paredes (yellow card) 65'; Munari (yellow card) 71'	Report	Gardner (yellow card) 51'; Bruno (yellow card) 52'; Dunk 77'	Attendance: 16,531 (1,886 Brighton fans); Referee: Simon Hooper

18 October 2014 12	Sheffield Wednesday	0–3	Watford	Hillsborough, Sheffield
15:00	Drenthe (yellow card) 88'	Report	Ighalo 21'; Abdi 38'; Ekstrand (yellow card) 44'; Pudil (yellow card) 55'; Vydra 69'	Attendance: 20,909; Referee: Jeremy Simpson

21 October 2014 13	Watford	2–2	Nottingham Forest	Vicarage Road, Watford
19:45	Ighalo 29'; Vydra 52' (pen.)	Report	Antonio 31', 67'; Mancienne (yellow card) 42'	Attendance: 16,095; Referee: Dean Whitestone

25 October 2014 14	Middlesbrough	1–1	Watford	Riverside Stadium, Middlesbrough
15:00	Ayala (yellow card) 34'; Bamford (yellow card) 46'; Kike 49'; Whitehead (yellow card) 51'; Fredericks (yellow card) 90+2'	Report	Forestieri (yellow card) 39'; Deeney 61'	Attendance: 17,491; Referee: James Adcock

1 November 2014 15	Watford	3–1	Millwall	Vicarage Road, Watford
15:00	Vydra 36'; Tőzsér 45+4'; Hoban (yellow card) 62'; Munari 64'	Report	Woolford 12'; Forde (yellow card) 22'; Briggs (yellow card) 35'; Fuller (yellow card) 41'; Dunne (yellow card) 45+3'; Williams (yellow card) 90+4'	Attendance: 17,000; Referee: Bobby Madley

4 November 2014 16	Birmingham City	2–1	Watford	St Andrew's, Birmingham
19:45	Donaldson 2', 85'; Davis (yellow card) 51'	Report	Forestieri 7'; Andrews (yellow card) 81'; Deeney (yellow card) 89'	Attendance: 18,309; Referee: Mark Heywood

8 November 2014 17	Ipswich Town	1–0	Watford	Portman Road, Ipswich
15:00	McGoldrick (yellow card) 43'; Smith 83'	Report	Paredes (yellow card) 33'; Ekstrand (yellow card) 58'; Munari (yellow card) 75'	Attendance: 22,490; Referee: Eddie Ilderton

22 November 2014 18	Watford	1–2	Derby County	Vicarage Road, Watford
15:00	Munari 67', (yellow card) 90+3'; Doyley (yellow card) 84'; Deeney (yellow card) 90+3'; Tőzsér (yellow card) 90+4'	Report	Keogh (yellow card) 13'; Ibe 39'; Bryson 81'	Attendance: 17,421; Referee: Keith Stroud

29 November 2014 19	Watford	0–1	Cardiff City	Vicarage Road, Watford
15:00		Report	Le Fondre 12', (yellow card) 71'; Noone (yellow card) 88'	Attendance: 15,668; Referee: Phil Gibbs

5 December 2014 20	Fulham	0–5	Watford	Craven Cottage, London
19:45	Bettinelli (red card) 18'	Report	Abdi 15', 51'; Deeney 20' (pen.), 37', 90+3'; Bassong (yellow card) 77'	Attendance: 16,772; Referee: Paul Tierney

13 December 2014 21	Watford	2–1	Wigan Athletic	Vicarage Road, Watford
15:00	Deeney 20', 82'; Abdi (yellow card) 54'; Tőzsér (yellow card) 78'	Report	McMananman (yellow card) 20'; McCann 45'	Attendance: 15,297; Referee: Mark Haywood

20 December 2014 22	Reading	0–1	Watford	Madejski Stadium, Reading
15:00	Williams (yellow card) 72'; Murray (yellow card) 90+2'	Report	Abdi (yellow card) 29', (goal) 70'; Angella (yellow card) 38' (yellow-red card) 45+1'	Attendance: 18,522; Referee: Gavin Ward

26 December 2014 23	Watford	0–1	Wolverhampton Wanderers	Vicarage Road, Watford
15:00	Deeney (yellow card) 43'; Tőzsér (yellow card) 71'	Report	Dicko 57'; Stearman (yellow card) 64'; Price (yellow card) 90+3'	Attendance: 17,443; Referee: Graham Scott

28 December 2014 24	Cardiff City	2–4	Watford	Cardiff City Stadium, Cardiff
15:00	Le Fondre 20'; Jones 90+1'	Report	Guedioura 42', 63'; Ighalo 45+1'; Angella 83'	Attendance: 22,208; Referee: Stuart Attwell

10 January 2015 25	Huddersfield Town	3–1	Watford	John Smith's Stadium, Huddersfield
15:00	Hudson (yellow card) 46'; Wells 52'; Robinson (yellow card) 65'; Vaughan 77'; Lynch 83'	Report	Hoban (yellow card) 16'; Ighalo 65'; Layún (yellow card) 90+5'	Attendance: 13,843; Referee: Chris Kavanagh

17 January 2015 26	Watford	5–0	Charlton Athletic	Vicarage Road, Watford
15:00	Cathcart 15'; Deeney 25'; Ighalo 44', 58'; Tőzsér 90+3'	Report	Solly (yellow card) 5'; Bikey (yellow card) 90+2'	Attendance: 17,703; Referee: Darren Bond

24 January 2015 27	Watford	7–2	Blackpool	Vicarage Road, Watford
15:00	Ighalo 47', 54', 73', 81'; Deeney 53'; Vydra 59'; Angella 66'	Report	Orlandi 8'; Davies (yellow card) 39', (goal) 42'	Attendance: 17,015; Referee: Fred Graham

30 January 2015 28	AFC Bournemouth	2–0	Watford	Dean Court, Bournemouth
19:45 GMT	Cook (yellow card) 28'; Kermorgant 35' (pen.); Arter (yellow card) 39'; Ritchie 57'; Elphick (yellow card) 87'	Report	Angella (red card) 1'	Attendance: 10,904; Referee: Lee Probert

7 February 2015 29	Watford	1–0	Blackburn Rovers	Vicarage Road, Watford
15:00	Paredes (yellow card) 20'; Cathcart (yellow card) 28'; Munari (yellow card) 45+1'; Ighalo 83'	Report	Spearing (yellow card) 19'; Kilgallon (yellow card) 55'	Attendance: 15,011; Referee: Andy Madley

10 February 2015 30	Brentford	1–2	Watford	Griffin Park, Brentford, London
19:45	Bidwell (red card) 38'; Gray 53'; Dean (yellow card) 56'; Smith (yellow card) 82'	Report	Ighalo 68', 90+1'; Paredes (yellow card) 90+2'	Attendance: 10.524; Referee: Keith Stroud

14 February 2015 31	Bolton Wanderers	3–4	Watford	Macron Stadium, Bolton
15:00	Bannan (yellow card) 32'; Clough 37', 85'; Le Fondre 41'	Report	Cathcart (yellow card) 7'; Ighalo 25', (yellow card) 90+1'; Abdi 69'; Ekstrand 74'; Deeney 90'	Attendance: 14,230; Referee: Geoff Eltringham

21 February 2015 32	Watford	0–3	Norwich City	Vicarage Road, Watford
15:00	Cathcart (yellow card) 53'; Watson (yellow card) 67'	Report	Tettey (yellow card) 38'; Johnson (yellow card) 38'; Grabban 65' (pen.), 85'; Jerome 70'	Attendance: 18,602; Referee: Carl Berry

24 February 2015 33	Watford	3–0	Rotherham United	Vicarage Road, Watford
19:45	Ighalo 18', 56'; Deeney 54'	Report	Árnason (yellow card) 53'; Smallwood (yellow card) 76'	Attendance: 13,468; Referee: Andy Davies

28 February 2015 34	Leeds United	2–3	Watford	Elland Road, Leeds
15:00	Sharp 6'; Austin 19'; Cook (yellow card) 21'	Report	Deeney 39'; Vydra 56', 80'; Watson (yellow card) 48'; Abdi (yellow card) 87'	Attendance: 24,705; Referee: Andy Haines

3 March 2015 35	Watford	1–0	Fulham	Vicarage Road, Watford
19:45	Deeney 9'; Guedioura (yellow card) 83'	Report	Fofana (yellow card) 53'; Richards (yellow card) 59'	Attendance: 15,809; Referee: Trevor Kettle

7 March 2015 36	Wolverhampton Wanderers	2–2	Watford	Molineux, Wolverhampton
15:00	Afobe 14'; Price 51' (yellow card) 90'	Report	Vydra 30'; Deeney 65'; Hoban (yellow card) 82' (yellow-red card) 90'; Forestieri (yellow card) 90'	Attendance: 23,146; Referee: Brendan Malone

14 March 2015 37	Watford	4–1	Reading	Vicarage Road, Watford
19:45	Abdi 1'; Vydra 39'; Deeney 48'; Forestieri 85'	Report	Karacan 70'	Attendance: 16,660; Referee: Darren Bond

17 March 2015 38	Wigan Athletic	0–2	Watford	DW Stadium, Wigan
19:45	Perch (yellow card) 74'	Report	Guedioura (yellow card) 18'; Forestieri (yellow card) 53'; Deeney 54', 90' (pen.)	Attendance: 10,684; Referee: David Coote

21 March 2015 39	Watford	0–1	Ipswich Town	Vicarage Road, Watford
15:00	Angella (yellow card) 37'	Report	Murphy (yellow card) 28'; Mings (yellow card) 52'; Tabb (yellow card) 90'; Chaplow 90'	Attendance: 19,038; Referee: Andy D'Urso

3 April 2015 40	Derby County	2–2	Watford	Pride Park, Derby
19:45	Bent 45' (pen.); Bryson (yellow card) 56'; Ince 57'; Keogh (yellow card) 90'	Report	Watson (yellow card) 7'; Vydra 23'; Motta (red card) 45'; Deeney (yellow card) 65'; Ighalo 75'; Connolly (yellow card) 90'; Catchart (yellow card) 90'	Attendance: 31,748; Referee: Kevin Friend

6 April 2015 41	Watford	2–0	Middlesbrough	Vicarage Road, Watford
12:30	Deeney 37'; Ighalo 65'; Guedioura (yellow card) 70'; Layún (yellow card) 90'	Report	Reach (yellow card) 26'; Leadbitter (yellow card) 90'	Attendance: 19,656; Referee: Mike Jones

11 April 2015 42	Millwall	0–2	Watford	The Den, Bermondsey, London
15:00	Harding (yellow card) 54'; Nelson (yellow card) 76'; Beevers (yellow card) 79'	Report	Vydra 26'; Guedioura 56'	Attendance: 12,075; Referee: Simon Hooper

15 April 2015 43	Nottingham Forest	1–3	Watford	City Ground, Nottingham
19:45	Wilson (red card) 60'; Gardner 72'	Report	Ighalo 4'; Connolly 41'; Deeney (yellow card) 52'; Abdi (yellow card) 55', (goal) 87'; Motta (yellow card) 65'; Cathcart (yellow card) 71'	Attendance: 20,723; Referee: Paul Tierney

18 April 2015 44	Watford	1–0	Birmingham City	Vicarage Road, Watford
15:00	Cathcart 56', (yellow card) 61'	Report	Grounds (yellow card) 58'	Attendance: 19,156; Referee: Mark Haywood

25 April 2015 45	Brighton & Hove Albion	0–2	Watford	Brighton
12:15	Kayal (yellow card) 43'; Stephens (yellow card) 90'; Greer (yellow card) 90'	Report	Deeney 29', (yellow card) 87'; Cathcart (yellow card) 61'; Angella (yellow card) 66'; Guedioura (yellow card) 90'; Vydra 90'	Stadium: Falmer Stadium, Brighton; Attendance: 28,841; Referee: Keith Stroud

2 May 2015 46	Watford	1–1	Sheffield Wednesday	Vicarage Road, Watford
12:15	Vydra 25'	Report	Semedo (yellow card) 73'; Nuhiu 90'	Attendance: 20,250; Referee: Lee Probert

=== FA Cup ===
4 January 2015 Third round	Chelsea	3–0	Watford	Stamford Bridge, London
14:00	Willian 58'; Rémy 70'; Zouma 72'	Report	Paredes (yellow card) 26'; Tőzsér (yellow card) 66'	Attendance: 41,010; Referee: Kevin Friend

=== League Cup ===
The draw for the first round was made on 17 June 2014 at 10am. Watford were drawn away to Stevenage.

12 August 2014 Round One	Stevenage	0–1	Watford	Broadhall Way, Stevenage
19:45		Report	Dyer 52'	Attendance: 3,969 (1,860 Hornets fans); Referee: Carl Berry

26 August 2014 Round Two	Watford	1–2	Doncaster Rovers	Vicarage Road, Watford
19:45	Dyer 31'	Report	Tyson 12' (pen.); Wakefield 52'	Attendance: 7,318 (270 Rovers fans); Referee: Andy Woolmer

== Squad statistics ==
No. = Squad number

Pos = Playing position

P = Number of games played

G = Number of goals scored

= Yellow cards

GK = Goalkeeper

DF = Defender

MF = Midfielder

FW = Forward

= Red cards

Yth = Whether player went through Watford's youth system

Joined club = Year that player became a Watford first team player (Note: For players who came through the club's youth system the date used refers to when they signed a professional contract, unless they appeared in a first-team match-day squad prior to that, in which case that date is used.)

Age = Current age

Left club during 2014–15

† Loan player (Note: A dagger is only displayed if the player was exclusively a loan player during the 2014–15 season. If they signed permanently over the course of the season then it is not displayed.)

Statistics correct as of 2 May 2015.

2014–15 Watford player details (Note: All players who have been signed to the club since the opening day of the 2014–15 season are listed)
No.	Pos	Name	P	G	P	G	P	G	P	G	Yellow cards	Red cards	Age	Joined club	Yth	Notes
No.	Pos	Name	Championship		FA Cup		League Cup		Total		Discipline		Age	Joined club	Yth	Notes
1	GK	Heurelho Gomes	44	0	0	0	0	0	44	0	0	0	34	2014	No	—
2	MF	Luke O'Nien	0	0	0	0	0	0	0	0	0	0	20	2013	Yes	—
3	MF	Gianni Munari	21+7	3	1	0	1+1	0	31	3	2	0	31	2014	No	†
4	DF	Gabriele Angella	32+3	2	1	0	0	0	36	2	1	0	26	2013	No	—
5	MF	Keith Andrews	4+5	1	0	0	2	0	11	1	2	0	34	2014	No	†
5	MF	Adlène Guedioura	13+4	3	0	0	0	0	17	3	1	0	29	2014	No	—
6	DF	Joel Ekstrand	23+1	1	0	0	0+1	0	25	1	0	1	26	2012	No	—
7	MF	Cristian Battocchio	0	0	0	0	0	0	0	0	0	0	23	2012	No	—
7	MF	Miguel Layún	14+3	0	0	0	0	0	17	0	0	0	26	2015	No	—
8	MF	Dániel Tőzsér	34+11	5	1	0	0	0	46	5	2	0	29	2014	No	†
9	FW	Troy Deeney	37+5	21	1	0	0	0	43	21	1	0	26	2010	No	—
10	MF	Lewis McGugan	5+1	0	0	0	1	0	7	0	0	0	26	2013	No	—
11	FW	Fernando Forestieri	10+14	5	1	0	1	0	26	5	0	0	25	2012	No	—
12	DF	Lloyd Doyley	5+1	0	0	0	2	0	8	0	0	0	32	2001	Yes	—
13	FW	Mathias Ranégie	0	0	0	0	0	0	0	0	0	0	30	2014	No	—
14	DF	Juan Carlos Paredes	32+7	0	1	0	0	0	40	0	2	0	27	2014	No	—
15	DF	Craig Cathcart	28+1	3	1	0	0	0	30	3	3	0	26	2014	No	—
16	MF	Sean Murray	2+4	0	0+1	0	1+1	0	9	0	0	0	21	2010	Yes	—
17	DF	Vujadin Savić	0	0	0	0	0	0	0	0	0	0	24	2015	No	—
17	DF	Gabriel Tamaș	6+1	0	0	0	2	0	9	0	1	1	31	2014	No	—
18	DF	Daniel Pudil	19+4	0	1	0	1+1	0	26	0	1	0	29	2012	No	—
19	FW	Diego Fabbrini	2	0	0	0	1+1	0	4	0	0	0	24	2013	No	—
20	FW	Matěj Vydra	31+11	16	0+1	0	1+1	0	45	16	0	0	23	2014	No	†
21	MF	Ikechi Anya	27+8	0	0	0	1	0	36	0	0	0	27	2012	No	—
22	MF	Almen Abdi	28+4	9	0+1	0	0	0	33	9	1	0	28	2012	No	—
23	MF	Lloyd Dyer	4+10	1	0	0	2	2	16	3	0	0	32	2014	No	—
23	MF	Ben Watson	19+1	0	0	0	0	0	20	0	2	0	29	2015	No	—
24	FW	Odion Ighalo	22+13	20	1	0	2	0	38	20	1	0	25	2014	No	—
25	FW	Uche Ikpeazu	0	0	0	0	0	0	0	0	0	0	20	2013	No	—
26	FW	Bernard Mensah	0+1	0	0	0	0	0	1	0	0	0	20	2011	Yes	—
27	DF	Josh Doherty	0	0	0	0	0	0	0	0	0	0	19	2014	Yes	—
28	MF	Connor Smith	0	0	0	0	0	0	0	0	0	0	22	2011	Yes	—
29	FW	Alex Jakubiak	0	0	0	0	0	0	0	0	0	0	18	2014	Yes	—
30	GK	Jonathan Bond	2+1	0	1	0	2	0	6	0	0	0	21	2010	Yes	—
31	DF	Tommie Hoban	20+7	0	1	0	2	0	30	0	0	0	21	2011	Yes	—
32	MF	George Byers	0+1	0	0	0	0	0	1	0	0	0	18	2014	Yes	—
33	DF	Jorell Johnson	0	0	0	0	0	0	0	0	0	0	18	2014	Yes	—
34	GK	Rene Gilmartin	0	0	0	0	0	0	0	0	0	0	27	2014	No	—
39	DF	Sébastien Bassong	11	0	0	0	0	0	11	0	0	0	28	2014	No	†
39	DF	Matthew Connolly	4+2	1	0	0	0	0	6	1	0	0	27	2015	No	†
47	MF	Marco Motta	7+2	0	0	0	0	0	9	0	0	0	28	2014	Yes	—

== Staff ==
=== Non-playing staff ===
- Head-coach: Slaviša Jokanović (from 7 October)
- Assistant coach: Dean Austin (from 15 January)
- Assistant coach: Ruben Martinez (from 11 September; joint caretaker head coach 15–29 September)
- Assistant coach: Javier Pereira (from 11 September; joint caretaker head coach 15–29 September)
- Goalkeeping coach: Alec Chamberlain
- Goalkeeping coach: Paolo De Toffol
- Technical director: Luke Dowling (from 3 September)
- Academy manager: Chris McGuane
- Lead professional development coach: David Horseman (from 1 December)
- Academy Head of Coaching: Barry Quin (acting youth-team coach between Hughes' departure and appointment of Horseman)
- Chief scout: Filippo Giraldi
- Head of medical: Richard Collinge (from 9 February)
- Head of sports science: Gianni Brignardello
- Sport Scientist: Ben Dixon
- Kit manager: Will Jones
- Assistant kit manager: Craig Charles

Information correct as of 13 May 2015.

==== Former non-playing staff ====
- Head coach: Beppe Sannino (until 31 August)
- Head coach: Óscar García (2–29 September)
- Head-coach: Billy McKinlay (29 September–7 October; assistant coach: 26–29 September)
- Assistant coach: Giovanni Cusatis (until 11 September)
- Assistant coach: Francesco Troise (until 11 September)
- Technical director: Gianluca Nani (until 2 September)
- Youth team coach: David Hughes (until 6 August)
- Head of medical: Marco Cesarini (until late December)
- First-team analyst: Adam Carter

== Transfers ==
=== In ===
Date	Player	From	Fee	Ref
23 May 2014	Heurelho Gomes (BRA)	Tottenham Hotspur (ENG)	Free	
27 May 2014	Gabriel Tamaș (ROU)	Doncaster Rovers (ENG)	Free	
12 June 2014	Lloyd Dyer (ENG)	Leicester City (ENG)	Free	
24 June 2014	Craig Cathcart (NIR)	Blackpool (ENG)	Free	
16 July 2014	Juan Carlos Paredes (ECU)	Granada (ESP)	Undisclosed	
25 August 2014	Rene Gilmartin (IRL)	St Patrick's Athletic (IRL)	Free	
24 October 2014	Odion Ighalo (NGA)	Udinese (ITA)	Undisclosed	
9 January 2015	Miguel Layún (MEX)	Granada (ESP)	Undisclosed	
23 January 2015	Ben Watson (ENG)	Wigan Athletic (ENG)	Undisclosed	
23 January 2015	Vujadin Savić (SRB)	Bordeaux (FRA)	Free	
26 February 2015	Marco Motta (ITA)	Juventus (ITA)	Free	

=== Out ===
Date (Note: Where a player has been released, the date given is when their release was announced by Watford, not when their contract expired or when the joined their next club.)	Player	To (Note: Where a player has been released, the club they subsequently joined is listed, provided it is professional and occurred during the 2014–15 season.)	Fee	Ref
4 June 2014	Manuel Almunia (ESP)	Retired	Released	
4 June 2014	Marco Cassetti (ITA)	Retired	Released	
4 June 2014	Fitz Hall (ENG)	Free agent	Released	
4 June 2014	Ross Jenkins (ENG)	Free agent	Released	
4 June 2014	Lucas Neill (AUS)	Free agent	Released	
4 June 2014	Nyron Nosworthy (JAM)	Blackpool (ENG)	Released	
4 June 2014	Albert Riera (ESP)	Udinese (ITA)	Released	
2 July 2014	Marco Faraoni (ITA)	Udinese (ITA)	Undisclosed	
17 July 2014	Gary Woods (ENG)	Leyton Orient (ENG)	Free	
31 July 2014	Reece Brown (ENG)	Barnsley (ENG)	Undisclosed	
1 August 2014	Javier Acuña (PAR)	Club Olimpia (PAR)	Undisclosed	
14 January 2015	Gabriel Tamaș (ROU)	Steaua București (ROU)	Free	

=== Loans in ===
Start	Player	Parent club	End	Ref
26 June 2014	Matěj Vydra (CZE)	Udinese (ITA)	30 June 2015	
7 July 2014	Dániel Tőzsér (HUN)	Parma (ITA)	30 June 2015	
24 July 2014	Keith Andrews (IRL)	Bolton Wanderers (ENG)	2 February 2015	
30 July 2014	Odion Ighalo (NGA)	Udinese (ITA)	24 October 2014	
4 August 2014	Gianni Munari (ITA)	Parma (ITA)	30 June 2015	
8 October 2014	Sébastien Bassong (CMR)	Norwich City (ENG)	9 January 2015	
26 November 2014	Adlène Guedioura (ALG)	Crystal Palace (ENG)	1 January 2015	
27 February 2015	Adlène Guedioura (ALG)	Crystal Palace (ENG)	25 April 2015	
19 March 2015	Matthew Connolly (ENG)	Cardiff City (WAL)	30 June 2015	

=== Loans outs ===
Start	Player	To	End	Ref
5 August 2014	Essaïd Belkalem (ALG)	Trabzonspor (TUR)	30 June 2015	
13 August 2014	Alex Jakubiak (ENG)	Oxford United (ENG)	4 November 2014	
14 August 2014	Jorell Johnson (ENG)	Hemel Hempstead Town (ENG)	30 June 2015	
22 August 2014	Luke O'Nien (ENG)	Wealdstone (ENG)	30 June 2015	
26 August 2014	Cristian Battocchio (ITA)	Virtus Entella (ITA)	30 June 2015	
28 August 2014	Mathias Ranégie (SWE)	Millwall (ENG)	15 January 2015	
19 November 2014	Lewis McGugan (ENG)	Sheffield Wednesday (ENG)	1 January 2015	
26 November 2014	Uche Ikpeazu (ENG)	Crewe Alexandra (ENG)	25 January 2015	
27 November 2014	Alex Jakubiak (ENG)	Dagenham & Redbridge (ENG)	30 June 2015	
16 January 2015	Diego Fabbrini (ITA)	Millwall (ENG)	16 March 2015	
19 January 2015	Lloyd Dyer (ENG)	Birmingham City (ENG)	30 June 2015	
28 January 2015	Uche Ikpeazu (ENG)	Doncaster Rovers (ENG)	10 March 2015	
2 February 2015	Lewis McGugan (ENG)	Sheffield Wednesday (ENG)	30 June 2015	
5 February 2015	Mathias Ranégie (SWE)	Dalian Aerbin (CHN)	31 December 2015	
11 February 2015	Bernard Mensah (ENG)	Braintree Town (ENG)	30 June 2015	
13 March 2015	Uche Ikpeazu (ENG)	Crewe Alexandra (ENG)	30 June 2015	
26 March 2015	Diego Fabbrini (ITA)	Birmingham City (ENG)	30 June 2015	

== Reserves and academy ==
In 2014–15, Watford's under-21 side competed in the Under-21 Premier League Cup, progressing through four rounds before losing 3–2 away at Southampton in the quarter-finals. They also played in the Herts Senior Cup, progressing through one round before losing to Hemel Hempstead in the quarter-finals. The under-18s finished 5th in the South-East Conference of the Football League Youth Alliance, subsequently qualifying for Merit League One. In the FA Youth Cup they entered in the third round, losing 3–1 away at Swansea.

Watford's academy in 2014–15 consisted of 17 scholars:

- In the second year: Arie Ammann, Matthew Hall, Harry Kyprianou, Dennon Lewis, Mahlondo Martin, Il Myeong Choi, Kunle Otudeko, Carl Stewart and Alfie Young.
- In the first year: Jacob Cook, Andrew Eleftheriou, Michael Folivi, Max Makaka, Brandon Mason, Ogo Obi, Charlie Rowan and Connor Stevens.

Panos Armenakas was announced as joining the first-year in April 2014, but in June he signed for Italian club Udinese, who are also owned by the Pozzo family. On 1 September the club announced second-year midfielder Tom Rosenthal had left to join Belgian side S.V. Zulte Waregem in order for him to be closer to an ill family member. On 15 September striker Ogo Obi signed a two-year scholarship deal with the club, with a one-year professional deal from its expiration in 2016. Obi had been with the club since the under-11 age-group, but had spent time on trial with Manchester United over the pre-season. Goalkeeper Shaun Rowley, a scholar with Shrewsbury Town, joined the academy on a youth loan for the early part of the reason, returning to his parent club in October. Stewart transferred to Udinese in January. In February Folivi signed a deal that would see him become professional at the end of his scholarship in 2016, with the club holding the option of adding a further year.

On 1 May, Watford announced that Lewis, Martin and Young would be offered professional contracts of an unspecified length, while Hall would have his scholarship extended after he suffered from an injury in 2014–15. Ammann, Choi, Otudeko and Kyprianou, who was an unused substitute for the first-team's FA Cup game away at Bristol City on 4 January 2014, were released.
