= Mamadou Gueye =

Mamadou Gueye may refer to:

- Mamadou Gueye (jumper) (born 1986), Senegalese long and triple jumper
- Mamadou Gueye (sprinter) (born 1986), Senegalese 400 metres sprinter
- Mamadou Gueye (fighter) (born 1992), French MMA fighter
- Mamadou Gueye (basketball) (born 1993), Canadian basketball player
- Pabi Gueye (born 1978), Senegalese basketball player and coach

== See also ==
- Gueye
