= 2015–16 Watford F.C. season =

English football team season

Watford
2015–16 season
- Owner: Gino Pozzo
- Chairman: Raffaele Riva
- Manager: Quique Sánchez Flores
- Stadium: Vicarage Road Stadium
- Premier League: 13th
- FA Cup: Semi-finals
- League Cup: Second round
- Top goalscorer: League: Odion Ighalo (15); All: Odion Ighalo (17)
Home colours	Away colours

The 2015–16 season was Watford's 135th year in existence and first season back in the Premier League after gaining promotion the previous season. This season Watford participated in the Premier League, FA Cup and League Cup. The season covers the period from 1 July 2015 to 30 June 2016.

== Pre-season friendlies ==
On 14 May 2015, Watford announced they would travel to Wimbledon on 11 July in a pre-season friendly. On 10 June, a trip to Germany was confirmed. On 18 June, the Hornets announced 2015 UEFA Europa League winners Sevilla would visit on 1 August. A day later, a fifth pre-season friendly was confirmed against Cardiff City. On 1 July, Watford announced they will kick pre-season off with a trip to St Albans City. On 10 July, the Hornets confirmed they would travel to Scotland to face Dundee United on 25 July.

8 July 2015 Friendly	St Albans City	0–4	Watford	St Albans
19:45 BST		Report	Ighalo 32', 35'; Deeney 67'; Smith 88'	Stadium: Clarence Park; Referee: David Rock

11 July 2015 Friendly	Wimbledon	2–2	Watford	Norbiton
15:00 BST	Kennedy 12' (pen.); Francomb 90' (pen.)	Report	Ighalo 34'; Forestieri 52'	Stadium: Kingsmeadow; Attendance: 2,988 (1,307 away fans); Referee: Tim Robinson

15 July 2015 Friendly	SC Verl	1–4	Watford	Magdeburg, Germany
19:30 CEST	Al-Ghaddioui 64' (pen.)	Report	Ighalo 16', 39'; Anya 41'; Dyer 72'	Stadium: Stadion an der Poststraße

17 July 2015 Friendly	Eintracht Braunschweig	P–P	Watford	Braunschweig, Germany
19:30 CEST				Stadium: Eintracht-Stadion

19 July 2015 Friendly	SC Paderborn	0–2	Watford	Paderborn, Germany
14:00 CEST		Report	Vydra; Ighalo	Stadium: Benteler Arena

25 July 2015 Friendly	Dundee United	0–1	Watford	Dundee, Scotland
15:00 BST		Report	Deeney 53'	Stadium: Tannadice Park

28 July 2015 Friendly	Cardiff City	2–1	Watford	Cardiff, Wales
19:45 BST	Mason 19', 80'	Report	Deeney 30'	Stadium: Cardiff City Stadium

31 July 2015 Friendly	Watford	0–1	Sevilla	Watford
19:45 BST		Report	Vitolo 70'	Stadium: Vicarage Road; Attendance: 8,947; Referee: Kevin Friend

== Competitions ==
=== Overall ===
Competition	Started round	Current position / round	Final position / round	First match	Last match
Premier League	—	—	13th	8 August 2015	15 May 2016
FA Cup	Third round	—	Semi-finals	9 January 2016	24 April 2016
League Cup	Second round	—	Second round	25 August 2015	25 August 2015

Updated to match played 16 May 2016
Source: Competitions

=== Overview ===
Competition	Record							
Competition	G	W	D	L	GF	GA	GD	Win %
Premier League	38	12	9	17	40	50	−10	31.58
FA Cup	5	4	0	1	6	3	+3	80.00
League Cup	1	0	0	1	0	1	−1	0.00
Total	44	16	9	19	46	54	−8	36.36

Updated to match played 16 May 2016
Source: Competitions

=== Premier League ===
==== League table ====
Pos	Team	Pld	W	D	L	GF	GA	GD	Pts
11	Everton	38	11	14	13	59	55	+4	47
12	Swansea City	38	12	11	15	42	52	−10	47
13	Watford	38	12	9	17	40	50	−10	45
14	West Bromwich Albion	38	10	13	15	34	48	−14	43
15	Crystal Palace	38	11	9	18	39	51	−12	42

Source: Barclays Premier League
Rules for classification: 1) Points; 2) Goal difference; 3) Goals scored; 4) Play-offs (only if needed to decide champion, teams for relegation or teams for UEFA competitions).

==== Results summary ====
Overall								Home						Away					
Pld	W	D	L	GF	GA	GD	Pts	W	D	L	GF	GA	GD	W	D	L	GF	GA	GD
38	12	9	17	40	50	−10	45	6	6	7	20	19	+1	6	3	10	20	31	−11

Last updated: 21 May 2016.

==== Results by matchday ====
Matchday	1	2	3	4	5	6	7	8	9	10	11	12	13	14	15	16	17	18	19	20	21	22	23	24	25	26	27	28	29	30	31	32	33	34	35	36	37	38
Ground	A	H	H	A	H	A	H	A	H	A	H	A	H	A	H	A	H	A	H	H	A	A	H	H	A	A	H	A	H	H	A	H	A	A	H	A	A	H
Result	D	D	D	L	W	W	L	D	L	W	W	L	L	W	W	W	W	D	L	L	L	L	W	D	L	W	D	L	L	L	L	D	W	L	W	L	L	D
Position	5	11	11	16	12	9	13	11	14	12	9	11	13	11	9	7	7	7	8	9	10	12	10	9	10	8	10	12	12	14	14	15	12	12	12	13	13	13

Updated to match(es) played on 21 April 2016. Source: Statto.com
A = Away; H = Home; W = Win; D = Draw; L = Loss

==== Matches ====
On 17 June 2015, the fixtures for the forthcoming season were announced.

Win Draw Loss Postponed

8 August 2015 1	Everton	2–2	Watford	Liverpool
15:00 BST	Coleman (yellow card) 54'; Barkley 76'; Koné 86'	Report	Layún 14'; Deeney (yellow card) 42'; Holebas (yellow card) 66'; Ighalo 83'	Stadium: Goodison Park; Attendance: 39,063; Referee: Mike Jones

15 August 2015 2	Watford	0–0	West Bromwich Albion	Watford
15:00 BST	Nyom (yellow card) 90+1'	Report	Olsson (yellow card) 31'; Lambert (yellow card) 66'	Stadium: Vicarage Road; Attendance: 20,011; Referee: Paul Tierney

23 August 2015 3	Watford	0–0	Southampton	Watford
16:00 BST		Report	Wanyama (yellow card) 28'; Romeu (yellow card) 57'	Stadium: Vicarage Road; Attendance: 20,166; Referee: Andre Marriner

29 August 2015 4	Manchester City	2–0	Watford	Manchester
15:00 BST	Kompany (yellow card) 40'; Sterling 47'; Fernandinho 56'	Report	Nyom (yellow card) 43'; Prödl (yellow card) 63'	Stadium: Etihad Stadium; Attendance: 53,218; Referee: Mark Clattenburg

12 September 2015 5	Watford	1–0	Swansea City	Watford
15:00 BST	Ighalo 59'; Behrami (red card) 64'	Report		Stadium: Vicarage Road; Attendance: 20,057; Referee: Robert Madley

19 September 2015 6	Newcastle United	1–2	Watford	Newcastle
15:00 BST	Janmaat 68'; Colback (yellow card) 89'	Report	Ighalo 10', 28'; Abdi (yellow card) 36'; Capoue (yellow card) 80'	Stadium: St James' Park; Attendance: 47,806; Referee: Roger East

27 September 2015 7	Watford	0–1	Crystal Palace	Watford
16:00 BST		Report	Cabaye 71' (pen.)	Stadium: Vicarage Road; Attendance: 20,168; Referee: Anthony Taylor

3 October 2015 8	AFC Bournemouth	1–1	Watford	Bournemouth
15:00 BST	Murray 28', (yellow card) 43'	Report	Ighalo 45'; Gomes (yellow card) 84'	Stadium: Vitality Stadium; Attendance: 11,187; Referee: Michael Oliver

17 October 2015 9	Watford	0–3	Arsenal	Watford
17:30 BST	Nyom (yellow card) 47'; Gomes (yellow card) 63'	Report	Mertesacker (yellow card) 59'; Sánchez 62'; Giroud 68'; Ramsey 74'	Stadium: Vicarage Road; Attendance: 20,721; Referee: Mike Jones

24 October 2015 10	Stoke City	0–2	Watford	Stoke-on-Trent
15:00 BST	Whelan (yellow card) 76'; Pieters (yellow card) 88'; Adam (yellow card) 89'	Report	Deeney 43'; Abdi 69'; Ighalo (yellow card) 88'	Stadium: Britannia Stadium; Attendance: 27,587; Referee: Martin Atkinson

31 October 2015 11	Watford	2–0	West Ham United	Watford
15:00 GMT	Ighalo 39', 48'; Nyom (yellow card) 66'; Aké (yellow card) 81'; Capoue (yellow card) 85'	Report	Collins (red card) 84'	Stadium: Vicarage Road; Attendance: 20,598; Referee: Keith Stroud

7 November 2015 12	Leicester City	2–1	Watford	Leicester
15:00 GMT	Kanté 53'; Vardy 65' (pen.)	Report	Gomes (yellow card) 65'; Deeney 76' (pen.)	Stadium: King Power Stadium; Attendance: 32,029; Referee: Roger East

21 November 2015 13	Watford	1–2	Manchester United	Watford
12:45 GMT	Watson (yellow card) 68'; Deeney 87' (pen.)	Report	Depay 11'; Young (yellow card) 74'; Lingard (yellow card) 75'; Deeney 90' (o.g.)	Stadium: Vicarage Road; Attendance: 20,702; Referee: Robert Madley

28 November 2015 14	Aston Villa	2–3	Watford	Birmingham
15:00 GMT	Richards 41'; Clark (yellow card) 88'; Ayew 89'; Sánchez (yellow card) 90'	Report	Ighalo 17'; Watson (yellow card) 40'; Hutton 69' (o.g.); Capoue (yellow card) 74'; Deeney 85', (yellow card) 86'; Aké (yellow card) 90'	Stadium: Villa Park; Attendance: 35,057; Referee: Lee Mason

5 December 2015 15	Watford	2–0	Norwich City	Watford
15:00 GMT	Deeney 30' (pen.), (yellow card) 57'; Watson (yellow card) 60'; Ighalo (yellow card) 90', (goal) 90+2'	Report	Tettey (yellow card) 29'; Bennett (yellow card) 77'; Brady (yellow card) 87'	Stadium: Vicarage Road; Attendance: 20,422; Referee: Mike Dean

12 December 2015 16	Sunderland	0–1	Watford	Sunderland
15:00 GMT	Rodwell (yellow card) 60'	Report	Ighalo 4'	Stadium: Stadium of Light; Attendance: 43,989; Referee: Graham Scott

20 December 2015 17	Watford	3–0	Liverpool	Watford
13:30 GMT	Aké 3'; Ighalo 15', 85'; Britos (yellow card) 78'	Report		Stadium: Vicarage Road; Attendance: 20,707; Referee: Mark Clattenburg

26 December 2015 18	Chelsea	2–2	Watford	London
15:00 GMT	Costa 32', 65', (yellow card) 88'; Oscar (penalty missed) 80'	Report	Deeney 42' (pen.); Britos (yellow card) 44'; Cathcart (yellow card) 49'; Cahill 56' (o.g.); Holebas (yellow card) 81'; Behrami (yellow card) 83'	Stadium: Stamford Bridge; Attendance: 41,620; Referee: Andre Marriner

28 December 2015 19	Watford	1–2	Tottenham Hotspur	Watford
15:00 GMT	Ighalo 41', (yellow card) 65'; Britos (yellow card) 52'; Jurado (yellow card) 58'; Aké (red card) 63'; Deeney (yellow card) 64'	Report	Alli (yellow card) 6'; Lamela 17'; Alderweireld (yellow card) 81'; Son 89'	Stadium: Vicarage Road; Attendance: 20,730; Referee: Anthony Taylor

2 January 2016 20	Watford	1–2	Manchester City	Watford
17:30 GMT	Nyom (yellow card) 38'; Watson 55'	Report	Touré 82'; Agüero 84'	Stadium: Vicarage Road; Attendance: 20,676; Referee: Martin Atkinson

13 January 2016 21	Southampton	2–0	Watford	Southampton
19:45 GMT	Long 16'; Cédric (yellow card) 24'; Tadić 74'	Report	Prodl (yellow card) 67'; Deeney (yellow card) 77'	Stadium: St Mary's Stadium; Attendance: 28,399; Referee: Craig Pawson

18 January 2016 22	Swansea City	1–0	Watford	Swansea
20:00 GMT	Williams 27'; Britton (yellow card) 62'; Sigurðsson (yellow card) 90'	Report	Jurado (yellow card) 22'; Nyom (yellow card) 33'	Stadium: Liberty Stadium; Attendance: 20,430; Referee: Michael Oliver

23 January 2016 23	Watford	2–1	Newcastle United	Watford
15:00 GMT	Ighalo 46'; Behrami (yellow card) 56'; Cathcart 58'; Britos (yellow card) 68'	Report	Mbemba (yellow card) 51'; Lascelles 71'	Stadium: Vicarage Road; Attendance: 20,611; Referee: Andre Marriner

3 February 2016 24	Watford	0–0	Chelsea	Watford
19:45 GMT	Prödl (yellow card) 19'; Paredes (yellow card) 45+2'	Report	Costa (yellow card) 45+2'	Stadium: Vicarage Road; Attendance: 20,910; Referee: Mike Dean

6 February 2016 25	Tottenham Hotspur	1–0	Watford	London
15:00 GMT	Trippier 64'	Report	Capoue (yellow card) 60'	Stadium: White Hart Lane; Attendance: 35,997; Referee: Roger East

13 February 2016 26	Crystal Palace	1–2	Watford	London
15:00 GMT	Adebayor 45'; Souaré (red card) 90+4'	Report	Deeney 16' (pen.), 82'; Suárez (yellow card) 76'	Stadium: Selhurst Park; Referee: Robert Madley

27 February 2016 27	Watford	0–0	AFC Bournemouth	Watford
15:00 GMT	Watson (yellow card) 77'; Behrami (yellow card) 82'; Cathcart (yellow card) 89'	Report	Surman (yellow card) 85'	Stadium: Vicarage Road; Attendance: 20,831; Referee: Anthony Taylor

2 March 2016 28	Manchester United	1–0	Watford	Manchester
20:00 GMT	Fosu-Mensah (yellow card) 23'; Mata 83'	Report	Britos (yellow card) 82'; Amrabat (yellow card) 90+2'	Stadium: Old Trafford; Attendance: 75,272; Referee: Mike Jones

5 March 2016 29	Watford	0–1	Leicester City	Watford
17:30 GMT	Amrabat (yellow card) 29'; Aké (yellow card) 58'	Report	Mahrez 56'; Fuchs (yellow card) 74'; Morgan (yellow card) 90+2'	Stadium: Vicarage Road; Attendance: 20,884; Referee: Jonathan Moss

19 March 2016 30	Watford	1–2	Stoke City	Watford
15:00 GMT	Capoue (yellow card) 41'; Nyom (yellow card) 45'; Guedioura (yellow card) 83'; Deeney 86'	Report	Walters 18', (yellow card) 76'; Joselu 51'	Stadium: Vicarage Road; Attendance: 20,759; Referee: Craig Pawson

2 April 2016 31	Arsenal	4–0	Watford	London
15:00 BST	Sánchez 4'; Iwobi 38'; Bellerín 48'; Elneny (yellow card) 84'; Walcott 90'	Report	Nyom (yellow card) 61'	Stadium: Emirates Stadium; Attendance: 59,981; Referee: Anthony Taylor

9 April 2016 32	Watford	1–1	Everton	Watford
15:00 BST	Capoue (yellow card) 13'; Coleman 45+2' (o.g.); Ighalo (yellow card) 90+3'	Report	McCarthy (yellow card) 43', (goal) 45+1'	Stadium: Vicarage Road; Attendance: 20,663; Referee: Kevin Friend

16 April 2016 33	West Bromwich Albion	0–1	Watford	West Bromwich
15:00 BST	Berahino (penalty missed) 67', 87'	Report	Watson 27'; Britos (yellow card) 32'; Gomes (yellow card) 67'; Deeney (yellow card) 86'	Stadium: The Hawthorns; Referee: Michael Oliver

20 April 2016 34	West Ham United	3–1	Watford	London
19:45 BST	Carroll 11'; Noble 45' (pen.), 53' (pen.)	Report	Prödl (yellow card) 22', (goal) 64'; Suárez (yellow card) 71'; Amrabat (yellow card) 76' (yellow-red card) 90+3'	Stadium: Boleyn Ground; Attendance: 34,857; Referee: Mike Dean

30 April 2016 35	Watford	3–2	Aston Villa	Watford
15:00 BST	Abdi 45+2', (yellow card) 82'; Deeney 90', 90+3'; Berghuis (yellow card) 78'	Report	Clark 28'; Gueye (yellow card) 45+1'; Ayew 48'; Cissokho (red card) 73'; Bunn (yellow card) 77'	Stadium: Vicarage Road; Attendance: 20,653; Referee: Anthony Taylor

8 May 2016 36	Liverpool	2–0	Watford	Liverpool
16:00 BST	Allen 35'; Flanagan (yellow card) 63'; Firmino 76'	Report	Britos (yellow card) 59'; Berghuis (yellow card) 73'	Stadium: Anfield; Attendance: 43,341; Referee: Lee Mason

11 May 2016 37	Norwich City	4–2	Watford	Norwich
19:45 BST	Redmond 15'; Mbokani 18', 57'; Cathcart 37' (o.g.); Bennett (yellow card) 47'; Odjidja-Ofoe (yellow card) 84'	Report	Deeney 11'; Abdi (yellow card) 43'; Ighalo 51'; Watson (yellow card) 67'; Aké (yellow card) 83'	Stadium: Carrow Road; Attendance: 26,279; Referee: Roger East

15 May 2016 38	Watford	2–2	Sunderland	Watford
15:00 BST	Prödl 48'; Deeney 61' (pen.); Guedioura (yellow card) 80'	Report	Rodwell 39'; Lens 51'	Stadium: Vicarage Road; Attendance: 21,012; Referee: Kevin Friend

=== FA Cup ===
Win Draw Loss Postponed

9 January 2016 Third round	Watford	1–0	Newcastle United	Watford
15:00 GMT	Deeney 44'; Guedioura (yellow card) 83'	Report	Tiote (yellow card) 37'	Stadium: Vicarage Road; Attendance: 18,259; Referee: Roger East

30 January 2016 Fourth round	Nottingham Forest	0–1	Watford	West Bridgford
15:00 GMT	Ward (yellow card) 60'; Lichaj (yellow card) 90+4'	Report	Amrabat (yellow card) 82'; Ighalo 88'	Stadium: City Ground; Attendance: 24,703; Referee: Neil Swarbrick

20 February 2016 Fifth round	Watford	1–0	Leeds United	Watford
15:00 GMT	Paredes (yellow card) 32'; Wootton 53' (o.g.); Cathcart (yellow card) 67'	Report	Bellusci (yellow card) 24'; Bridcutt (yellow card) 52'	Stadium: Vicarage Road; Attendance: 18,336; Referee: Michael Oliver

13 March 2016 Quarter-finals	Arsenal	1–2	Watford	London
13:30 GMT	Welbeck 88'	Report	Ighalo 50'; Guedioura 63'	Stadium: Emirates Stadium; Attendance: 58,436; Referee: Andre Marriner

24 April 2016 Semi-finals	Crystal Palace	2–1	Watford	London
16:00 BST	Bolasie 6'; Dann (yellow card) 54'; Wickham 61'	Report	Jurado (yellow card) 38'; Deeney 55', (yellow card) 89'; Suárez (yellow card) 79'	Stadium: Wembley Stadium; Attendance: 79,110; Referee: Craig Pawson

=== League Cup ===
Watford entered the competition in the second round and were drawn away to Preston North End.

Win Draw Loss Postponed

25 August 2015 Second round	Preston North End	1–0	Watford	Preston
19:45 BST	Vermijl 8'; Woods (yellow card) 34'; Reid (yellow card) 64'	Report	Britos (red card) 75'	Stadium: Deepdale; Attendance: 6,250; Referee: Steve Martin

== Staff ==
=== Squad information and statistics ===
No. = Squad number

Pos = Playing position

P = Number of games played

G = Number of goals scored

= Yellow cards

GK = Goalkeeper

DF = Defender

MF = Midfielder

FW = Forward

= Red cards

Yth = Whether player went through Watford's youth system

Joined club = Year that player became a Watford first team player (Note: For players who came through the club's youth system the date used refers to when they signed a professional contract, unless they appeared in a first-team match-day squad prior to that, in which case that date is used.)

Age = Current age

† Loan player (Note: A dagger is only displayed if the player was exclusively a loan player during the 2015–16 season. If they signed permanently over the course of the season then it is not displayed.)

Statistics correct as of 2 April 2016.

2015–16 Watford player details (Note: All players who have been signed to the club since the opening day of the 2015–16 season are listed. Scholars with professional contracts are not listed unless they appear in a first-team matchday squad.)
No.	Pos	Name	P	G	P	G	P	G	P	G	Yellow cards	Red cards	Age	Joined club	Yth	Notes
No.	Pos	Name	Premier League		FA Cup		League Cup		Total		Discipline		Age	Joined club	Yth	Notes
1	GK	Heurelho Gomes	38	0	1	0	0	0	39	0	0	0	45	2014	No	—
2	DF	Allan Nyom	29+3	0	4	0	0	0	33+3	0	8	0	38	2015	No	—
3	DF	Miguel Britos	24	0	2	0	1	0	27	0	6	1	40	2015	No	—
4	MF	Mario Suárez	8+7	0	1+1	0	0	0	9+8	0	1	0	39	2016	No	—
5	DF	Sebastian Prödl	19+2	2	3	0	0	0	22+2	2	4	0	38	2015	No	—
6	DF	Joel Ekstrand	0	0	0	0	0	0	0	0	0	0	37	2012	No	—
7	MF	José Manuel Jurado	27	0	2+1	0	0	0	29+1	0	3	0	39	2015	No	—
8	MF	Valon Behrami	14+7	0	1	0	0	0	15+7	0	3	1	41	2015	No	—
9	FW	Troy Deeney	36+2	13	5	2	0	0	41+2	17	5	0	37	2010	No	—
10	FW	Obbi Oularé	0+2	0	1	0	0	0	1+2	0	0	0	30	2015	No	—
11	MF	Nordin Amrabat	4+8	0	2+1	0	0	0	6+9	0	2	0	39	2016	No	—
13	GK	Rene Gilmartin	0	0	0	0	0	0	0	0	0	0	27	2014	No	—
14	DF	Juan Carlos Paredes	7+10	0	1+1	0	1	0	9+11	0	2	0	38	2014	No	—
15	DF	Craig Cathcart	34+1	1	5	0	0	0	39+1	1	4	0	37	2014	No	—
16	DF	Nathan Aké	20+4	1	3	0	1	0	24+4	1	2	1	31	2015	No	†
17	MF	Adlène Guedioura	3+15	0	3+2	1	0	0	6+17	1	2	0	40	2015	No	—
18	GK	Costel Pantilimon	0	0	4	0	0	0	4	0	1	0	39	2016	No	—
19	FW	Víctor Ibarbo	0+4	0	0	0	0	0	0+4	0	0	0	35	2015	No	† Loan terminate
20	MF	Steven Berghuis	0+9	0	1	0	0+1	0	1+10	0	0	0	34	2015	No	—
21	MF	Ikechi Anya	17+11	0	1+4	0	0	0	18+15	0	0	0	38	2012	No	—
22	MF	Almen Abdi	25+7	2	3+2	0	1	0	29+9	2	2	0	39	2012	No	—
23	MF	Ben Watson	31+4	2	5	0	1	0	37+4	2	3	0	40	2015	No	—
24	FW	Odion Ighalo	36+1	15	2+3	2	0	0	38+4	17	3	0	36	2014	No	—
25	DF	José Holebas	11	0	2	0	0	0	13	0	2	0	41	2015	No	—
26	FW	Bernard Mensah	0	0	0	0	0	0	0	0	0	0	31	2011	Yes	—
27	DF	Essaïd Belkalem	0	0	0	0	0	0	0	0	0	0	37	2013	No	—
28	MF	Connor Smith	0	0	0	0	1	0	1	0	0	0	33	2011	Yes	—
29	MF	Étienne Capoue	33	0	3	0	0	0	36	0	6	0	37	2015	No	—
30	DF	Jorell Johnson	0	0	0	0	0	0	0	0	0	0	30	2014	Yes	—
31	DF	Tommie Hoban	0	0	0	0	0	0	0	0	0	0	32	2011	Yes	—
32	MF	Alessandro Diamanti	0+3	0	0	0	0	0	0+3	0	0	0	43	2015	No	† Loan terminate
33	MF	Lloyd Dyer	0	0	0	0	0	0	0	0	0	0	43	2014	No	Contract terminate
34	GK	Giedrius Arlauskis	0+1	0	0	0	1	0	1+1	0	0	0	38	2015	No	Out on loan
35	DF	Josh Doherty	0	0	0	0	0	0	0	0	0	0	30	2014	Yes	—
36	FW	Alex Jakubiak	0	0	0	0	0	0	0	0	0	0	29	2014	Yes	—
37	DF	Alfie Young	0	0	0	0	0	0	0	0	0	0	18	2015	Yes	—
38	DF	Mahlondo Martin	0	0	0	0	0	0	0	0	0	0	18	2015	Yes	—
39	FW	Dennon Lewis	0	0	0	0	0	0	0	0	0	0	18	2015	Yes	—
40	MF	George Byers	0	0	0	0	0	0	0	0	0	0	29	2014	Yes	—
—	DF	Gabriele Angella	0	0	0	0	1	0	1	0	0	0	37	2013	No	Out on loan
—	DF	Daniel Pudil	0	0	0	0	0	0	0	0	0	0	40	2012	No	Out on loan
—	DF	Juanfran	0	0	0	0	0	0	0	0	0	0	37	2015	No	Out on loan
—	MF	Abdoulaye Doucouré	0	0	0	0	0	0	0	0	0	0	33	2016	No	Out on loan
—	MF	Miguel Layún	2+1	1	0	0	1	0	3+1	1	0	0	37	2015	No	Out on loan
—	FW	Adalberto Peñaranda	0	0	0	0	0	0	0	0	0	0	28	2016	No	Out on loan
—	FW	Diego Fabbrini	0	0	0	0	0	0	0	0	0	0	35	2013	No	Sold
—	FW	Fernando Forestieri	0	0	0	0	1	0	1	0	0	0	36	2012	No	Sold
—	FW	Matěj Vydra	0	0	0	0	1	0	1	0	1	0	34	2015	No	Out on loan
—	FW	Uche Ikpeazu	0	0	0	0	0	0	0	0	0	0	31	2013	No	Out on loan
—	FW	Mathias Ranégie	0	0	0	0	0	0	0	0	0	0	41	2014	No	Out on loan

=== Non-playing staff ===
- Head-coach: Quique Sánchez Flores
- Assistant coach: Dean Austin
- Assistant coach: Antonio Díaz Carlavilla
- Assistant coach: Alberto Giráldez
- Goalkeeping coach: Paolo De Toffol
- Goalkeeping coach: Alec Chamberlain
- Technical director: Luke Dowling
- Chief scout: Filippo Giraldi
- Under-21 coach: Harry Kewell
- Academy manager: Chris McGuane
- Lead professional development coach: David Horseman
- Academy head of coaching: Barry Quin
- Head of medical: Richard Collinge
- Head of sports science: Gianni Brignardello
- Sport scientist: Ben Dixon
- Head of Prevention and Osteopath: Daniel Reguera
- First-team Sports Rehabilitation: Mike Spanou
- First-team Sports Rehabilitation: Moto Watanabe
- Kit manager: Will Jones

Information correct as of 24 May 2016.

== Transfers ==
=== In ===
Date	Player	From	Fee	Ref
30 June 2015	Juanfran (ESP)	Real Betis (ESP)	£1,500,000	
1 July 2015	Giedrius Arlauskis (LTU)	Steaua București (ROM)	Free	
1 July 2015	Sebastian Prödl (AUT)	Werder Bremen (GER)	Free	
1 July 2015	Matěj Vydra (CZE)	Udinese (ITA)	Undisclosed	
2 July 2015	José Holebas (GRE)	Roma (ITA)	£1,800,000	
6 July 2015	Étienne Capoue (FRA)	Tottenham Hotspur (ENG)	Undisclosed (~ £5,700,000)	
11 July 2015	Valon Behrami (SUI)	Hamburger SV (GER)	Undisclosed (~ £3,000,000)	
14 July 2015	Allan Nyom (CMR)	Udinese (ITA)	Undisclosed	
22 July 2015	Miguel Britos (URU)	Napoli (ITA)	Free	
22 July 2015	José Manuel Jurado (ESP)	Spartak Moscow (RUS)	Undisclosed	
23 July 2015	Steven Berghuis (NED)	AZ (NED)	£4,600,000	
1 September 2015	Adlène Guedioura (ALG)	Crystal Palace (ENG)	Undisclosed	
1 September 2015	Obbi Oularé (BEL)	Club Brugge (BEL)	Undisclosed	
18 January 2016	Nordin Amrabat (MAR)	Málaga (ESP)	Undisclosed	
19 January 2016	Costel Pantilimon (ROM)	Sunderland (ENG)	Undisclosed	
30 January 2016	Mario Suárez (ESP)	Fiorentina (ITA)	Undisclosed (~ £4,000,000)	
1 February 2016	Abdoulaye Doucouré (FRA)	Rennes (FRA)	Undisclosed	
1 February 2016	Adalberto Peñaranda (VEN)	Udinese (ITA)	Undisclosed	

=== Out ===
Date (Note: Where a player has been released, the date given is when their release was announced by Watford, not when their contract expired or when they joined their next club.)	Player	Transferred to (Note: Where a player has been released, the club they subsequently joined is listed, provided it is professional and occurred during the 2015-16 season.)	Fee	Ref
19 May 2015	Marco Motta (ITA)	n/a	Free (Released)	
19 May 2015	Luke O'Nien (ENG)	Wycombe Wanderers (ENG)	Free transfer (Released)	
19 May 2015	Vujadin Savić (SER)	Sheriff Tiraspol (MDA)	Free transfer (Released)	
4 July 2015	Jonathan Bond (ENG)	Reading (ENG)	Undisclosed (~ £250,000)	
6 July 2015	Dániel Tőzsér (HUN)	Queens Park Rangers (ENG)	Long-term loan cancelled	
16 July 2015	Lewis McGugan (ENG)	Sheffield Wednesday (ENG)	Undisclosed (~ £300,000)	
11 August 2015	Cristian Battocchio (ITA)	Stade Brestois 29 (FRA)	Undisclosed	
29 August 2015	Fernando Forestieri (ITA)	Sheffield Wednesday (ENG)	Undisclosed (~ £3,000,000)	
22 January 2016	Connor Smith (IRL)	AFC Wimbledon (ENG)	Free transfer	
27 January 2016	Diego Fabbrini (ITA)	Birmingham City (ENG)	£1,500,000	

=== Loans in ===
Date from	Player	Loaned from	Date until	Ref
14 August 2015	Nathan Aké (NED)	Chelsea (ENG)	End of season	
17 August 2015	Alessandro Diamanti (ITA)	Guangzhou Evergrande (CHN)	13 January 2016	
1 September 2015	Víctor Ibarbo (COL)	Cagliari (ITA)	End of season	

=== Loans out ===
Date from	Player	Loaned to	Date until	Ref
13 July 2015	Uche Ikpeazu (ENG)	Port Vale (ENG)	2 January 2016	
16 July 2015	Juanfran (ESP)	Deportivo La Coruña (ESP)	End of season	
27 July 2015	Diego Fabbrini (ITA)	Middlesbrough (ENG)	27 January 2016	
5 August 2015	Sean Murray (IRL)	Wigan Athletic (ENG)	16 January 2016 (Note: On 1 September 2015, Murray's Wigan loan was extended until 16 January 2016.)	
29 August 2015	Daniel Pudil (CZE)	Sheffield Wednesday (ENG)	End of season	
1 September 2015	Gabriele Angella (ITA)	Queens Park Rangers (ENG)	End of season	
1 September 2015	Miguel Layún (MEX)	Porto (POR)	End of season	
1 September 2015	Connor Smith (IRL)	Stevenage (ENG)	29 September 2015	
1 September 2015	Matěj Vydra (CZE)	Reading (ENG)	End of season	
21 January 2016	Uche Ikpeazu (ENG)	Blackpool (ENG)	End of season	
28 January 2016	Giedrius Arlauskis (LTU)	Espanyol (ESP)	End of season	
1 February 2016	Abdoulaye Doucouré (FRA)	Granada (ESP)	End of season	
1 February 2016	Adalberto Peñaranda (VEN)	Granada (ESP)	End of season	

== Reserves and academy ==
Watford's academy in 2015–16 consists of 17 scholars:

- In the second year: Jacob Cook, Andrew Eleftheriou, Michael Folivi, Nathan Gartside, Max Makaka, Brandon Mason, Ogo Obi, Charlie Rowan and Connor Stevens.
- In the first year: Denílson Carvalho, Ashley Charles, Treon Johnson, Dion Pereira, Joshua Roe, Louis Rogers, Max Ryan, David Sesay and Andrew Thomas.

In September 2014 and February 2015 respectively, strikers Ogo Obi and Michael Folivi signed agreements for one-year professional contracts to start at the end of their scholarships.
