= Craig Cathcart =

Northern Irish footballer

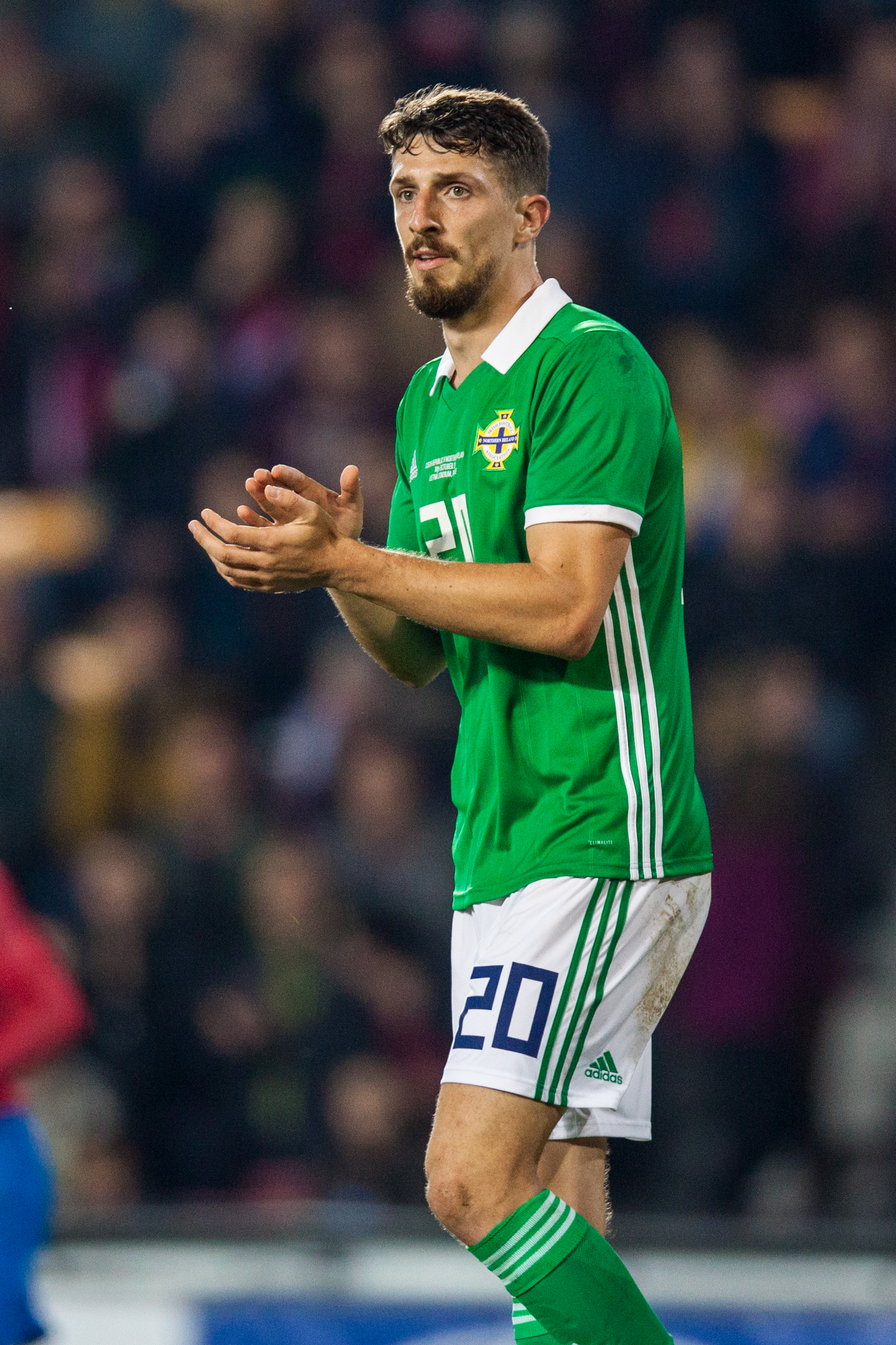
- Cathcart playing for Northern Ireland in 2019

Personal information
- Full name: Craig George Cathcart
- Date of birth: 6 February 1989 (age 37)
- Place of birth: Belfast, Northern Ireland
- Height: 6 ft 2 in (1.88 m)
- Position: Centre-back

Youth career
- 1999–2003: Carnmoney Colts
- 2003–2005: St Andrew's Boys' Club
- 2005–2007: Manchester United

Senior career*
| Years | Team | Apps | (Gls) |
| 2007–2010 | Manchester United | 0 | (0) |
| 2007 | → Royal Antwerp (loan) | 13 | (2) |
| 2008–2009 | → Plymouth Argyle (loan) | 31 | (1) |
| 2009 | → Watford (loan) | 12 | (0) |
| 2010–2014 | Blackpool | 112 | (3) |
| 2014–2023 | Watford | 235 | (8) |
| 2023 | Kortrijk | 0 | (0) |
| Total | | 403 | (14) |

International career
| | Northern Ireland U16 | 24 | (0) |
| | Northern Ireland U17 | 13 | (1) |
| | Northern Ireland U20 | 3 | (0) |
| 2006–2009 | Northern Ireland U21 | 15 | (0) |
| 2010–2023 | Northern Ireland | 73 | (2) |
- * Club domestic league appearances and goals

Craig George Cathcart (born 6 February 1989) is a Northern Irish former professional footballer who played as a centre-back.

A product of the Manchester United youth academy, Cathcart spent time on loan at Belgian club Royal Antwerp, and English Championship sides Plymouth Argyle and Watford, before joining then newly promoted club Blackpool in 2010. Cathcart returned to Watford permanently in July 2014, where he became one of their longest serving players, achieving two promotions in 2015 and 2021, and reaching an FA Cup final. He later left Watford in June 2023 and joined Belgian club K.V. Kortrijk in September, but then retired later that same month.

Having been a full international from youth to senior level, Cathcart previously represented Northern Ireland at under-21 level in 2006, having also captained the youth side. He received his first call-up for the Northern Ireland senior team in May 2009, and debuted for the senior side in 2010 at the age of 21, going on to make 73 caps and scoring 2 goals for the national team until 2023.

== Club career ==
=== Early career ===
Born in Belfast, Cathcart was spotted playing football for Glengormley High School at the age of 14, and, despite being coveted by clubs like Arsenal, Chelsea and Rangers upon winning the Northern Ireland Youth Player of the Year award in 2003, he began training at the Manchester United School of Excellence in Belfast. He signed trainee terms at Manchester United in July 2005, and turned professional on his 17th birthday in February 2006. Cathcart became a regular in the Manchester United Under-18s team, and was a member of the Under-17s team that played at the 2007 Northern Ireland Milk Cup, scoring the first goal in a 5–0 win over Liechtenstein. During the 2006–07 season, he was made captain of the United youth team that reached the FA Youth Cup Final, although he missed both legs of the final, the first through selection for the first team and the second through injury.

=== Manchester United ===
On 19 March 2007, Cathcart received his first call-up to the Manchester United senior squad for the FA Cup Sixth Round replay with Middlesbrough. After an injury to Nemanja Vidić, Cathcart was promoted to the first team squad as cover on 31 March 2007. He was an unused substitute in Manchester United's 7–1 win against Roma in the Champions League less than two weeks later, the FA Cup semi-final victory over Watford a further four days later, and the victory over Sheffield United on 17 April.

Speculation that a defensive injury crisis would lead to Cathcart making his senior debut had ended, when he suffered a season-ending knee injury during training after the match against Sheffield United. As a result, he also missed the second leg of the FA Youth Cup final; he had already missed the first leg due to his call-up to the senior squad. Despite his injury, Cathcart's performances in the club's youth teams earned him the Jimmy Murphy Young Player of the Year award for the 2006–07 season.

=== Loan to Antwerp ===
At the start of the 2007–08 season, Cathcart was sent on a half-season loan to United's Belgian feeder club, Royal Antwerp, to gain match experience. He made his debut for the Belgians on 22 September 2007, in a match against OC Charleroi. The next game saw Cathcart score Antwerp's only goal of the game in a 4–1 loss to Kortrijk. He scored again in a match against Tubize, to earn a 1–1 draw, and also the Man of the Match award. He made a further nine appearances for "The Great Old", to bring his total to 13, before returning to Manchester United at the end of 2007. Although he was not originally selected for the squad, Cathcart was briefly called up to the Manchester United first team for their tour of South Africa on 24 July 2008, and played the full 90 minutes in the team's 4–0 victory over Kaizer Chiefs on 26 July, his first appearance for the first team. He then came on as a 66th-minute substitute for compatriot Jonny Evans in a match against Portsmouth in Nigeria the following day, before then coming on for Wes Brown at half-time in a friendly against Peterborough United on 4 August.

=== Loans to the Championship ===
On 8 August 2008, in a search for first-team football, Cathcart joined Championship side Plymouth Argyle, on loan until the end of 2008. This was later extended to the entire 2008–09 season, as Cathcart had quickly become a regular at Home Park. He scored his first Plymouth goal in their 3–1 defeat at home to Ipswich Town in October 2008.

Cathcart returned to Manchester United at the end of the 2008–09 season and played in two pre-season friendlies for the reserve team before joining up with the first team for the Audi Cup in Munich. After Nemanja Vidić suffered a calf strain in the warm-up before the semi-final against Boca Juniors, Cathcart was promoted to the starting XI. Manchester United won the match 2–1, with Cathcart giving a good performance, although he did head the ball against his own crossbar midway through the second half.

Cathcart scored the opening goal in a 3–1 away win over Bolton Wanderers in the first game of the 2009–10 Premier Reserve League season on 24 August 2009. The following season, Cathcart was sought after by a number of Championship sides, and Manchester United received a bid of £1.25 million from a Championship side but United preferred a loan deal. Plymouth Argyle and Ipswich Town both showed an interest in the young defender, but he instead signed for Watford on loan until 4 January 2010, where he joined then fellow Manchester United teammate Tom Cleverley and Arsenal youngster Henri Lansbury on loan.

=== Blackpool ===
On 11 August 2010, Cathcart signed for Blackpool for an undisclosed fee, after agreeing a three-year contract, with an option for a further year. Three days later, he made his debut as Blackpool marked their Premier League debut with a 4–0 win over Wigan Athletic at the DW Stadium. He scored his first goal in the Premier League with a powerful header against his former club, Manchester United, at Bloomfield Road on 25 January 2011; the 15th-minute goal opened the scoring for the match, but Blackpool went on to lose 3–2.

=== Watford ===
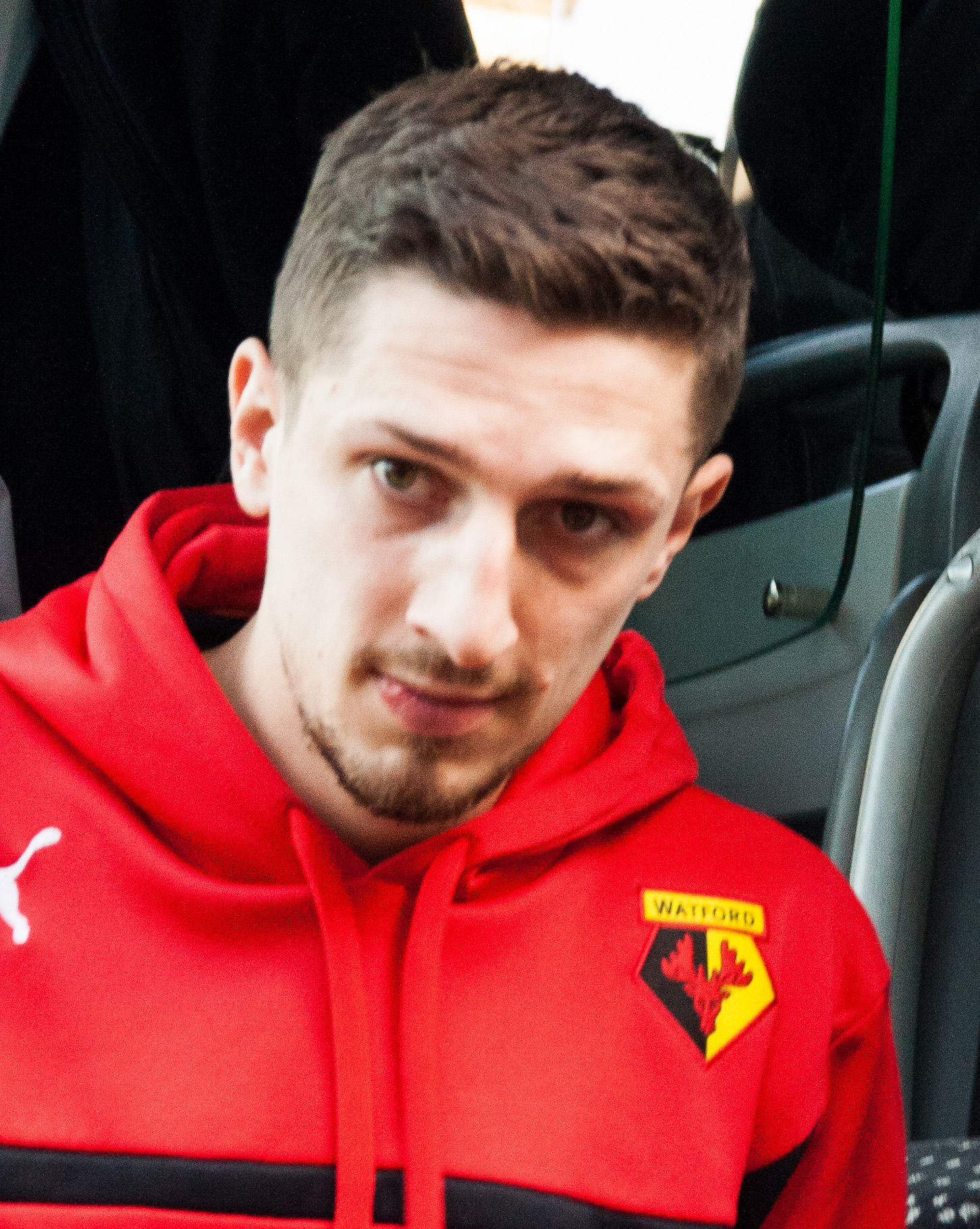
Cathcart with Watford in 2015

On 24 June 2014, Cathcart agreed terms on a two-year deal with Watford, effective from 1 July, having been out-of-contract at Blackpool. He officially became a Watford player on 1 July.

Cathcart's first Watford appearance came as a substitute for Gabriel Tamaș against AFC Bournemouth on 20 September 2014, scoring an equalising goal on his debut. In total, he played 29 league games, scoring three times, as Watford were promoted to the Premier League. On 2 July 2015, Cathcart signed a new four-year deal with the club, valid until 2019.

On 28 June 2017, Cathcart once again penned a four-year contract extension with the club. On 2 September 2018, Cathcart scored a header in an 2–1 home win against Tottenham Hotspur. On 12 June 2019, Cathcart extended his contract with the club for another four years, effective until June 2023.

On 11 September 2020, Cathcart scored the only goal in a 1–0 win over Middlesbrough in the Championship. He would later go on to achieve promotion back to the Premier League with Watford at the end of the same season.

On 30 June 2023, after a total of nine years and over 250 appearances, Watford announced Cathcart's departure from the club following the expiration of his contract.

=== Kortrijk and retirement ===
On 5 September 2023, Belgian Pro League club Kortrijk announced the signing of Cathcart on a one-year deal, with an option to extend his contract for another year. However, on 21 September, he decided to retire from professional football early into the season, as he felt he had lost his motivation and enthusiasm for the game.

== International career ==
Cathcart was involved with the Northern Ireland national team since Under-17 level, and was part of the team that attempted to qualify for the 2006 European Under-17 Championship.

By November 2006, still just 17 years old, Cathcart had been promoted to the Northern Ireland Under-21 team, and was named in the squad for a friendly against Germany on 14 November 2006. In February 2007, Cathcart was selected in the European squad for the 2007 Meridian Cup, a competition between two "all-star" Under-18 teams from Europe and Africa.

After his first call-up, Cathcart was a consistent name in Northern Ireland under-21 squads, also playing a 3–0 defeat by Germany on 5 September 2008.

Cathcart was called up to the Northern Ireland squad in May 2009, along with nine other uncapped players for the international friendly against Italy on 6 June. Cathcart made his full international debut in Northern Ireland's 1–0 win against Slovenia in Maribor on 3 September 2010. Playing out of position at left-back, due to an injury to Jonny Evans, Cathcart put in a strong performance and set up the winning goal for Corry Evans.

He played for the side at UEFA Euro 2016, when Northern Ireland made it out of the group before being knocked out by Wales in the round of 16; it was the nation's best performance at a UEFA European Championship.

== Career statistics ==
=== Club ===
Appearances and goals by club, season and competition
| Club | Season | League | | | National cup | | League cup | | Other | | Total | |
| Club | Season | Division | Apps | Goals | Apps | Goals | Apps | Goals | Apps | Goals | Apps | Goals |
|---|---|---|---|---|---|---|---|---|---|---|---|---|
| Manchester United | 2007–08 | Premier League | 0 | 0 | 0 | 0 | 0 | 0 | 0 | 0 | 0 | 0 |
| Manchester United | 2008–09 | Premier League | 0 | 0 | — | | — | | 0 | 0 | 0 | 0 |
| Manchester United | 2009–10 | Premier League | 0 | 0 | 0 | 0 | 0 | 0 | 0 | 0 | 0 | 0 |
| Manchester United | Total | | 0 | 0 | 0 | 0 | 0 | 0 | 0 | 0 | 0 | 0 |
| Royal Antwerp (loan) | 2007–08 | Belgian Second Division | 13 | 2 | 0 | 0 | — | | — | | 13 | 2 |
| Plymouth Argyle (loan) | 2008–09 | Championship | 31 | 1 | 1 | 0 | 1 | 0 | — | | 33 | 1 |
| Watford (loan) | 2009–10 | Championship | 12 | 0 | — | | — | | — | | 12 | 0 |
| Blackpool | 2010–11 | Premier League | 30 | 1 | 0 | 0 | 0 | 0 | — | | 30 | 1 |
| Blackpool | 2011–12 | Championship | 27 | 0 | 2 | 0 | 0 | 0 | 0 | 0 | 29 | 0 |
| Blackpool | 2012–13 | Championship | 25 | 1 | 1 | 0 | 0 | 0 | — | | 26 | 1 |
| Blackpool | 2013–14 | Championship | 30 | 1 | 1 | 0 | 1 | 0 | — | | 32 | 1 |
| Blackpool | Total | | 112 | 3 | 4 | 0 | 1 | 0 | 0 | 0 | 117 | 3 |
| Watford | 2014–15 | Championship | 29 | 3 | 1 | 0 | 0 | 0 | — | | 30 | 3 |
| Watford | 2015–16 | Premier League | 35 | 1 | 5 | 0 | 0 | 0 | — | | 40 | 1 |
| Watford | 2016–17 | Premier League | 15 | 0 | 1 | 0 | 0 | 0 | — | | 16 | 0 |
| Watford | 2017–18 | Premier League | 7 | 0 | 0 | 0 | 0 | 0 | — | | 7 | 0 |
| Watford | 2018–19 | Premier League | 36 | 3 | 4 | 0 | 1 | 0 | — | | 41 | 3 |
| Watford | 2019–20 | Premier League | 29 | 0 | 0 | 0 | 1 | 0 | — | | 30 | 0 |
| Watford | 2020–21 | Championship | 25 | 1 | 0 | 0 | 0 | 0 | — | | 25 | 1 |
| Watford | 2021–22 | Premier League | 31 | 0 | 1 | 0 | 0 | 0 | — | | 32 | 0 |
| Watford | 2022–23 | Championship | 28 | 0 | 0 | 0 | 1 | 0 | — | | 29 | 0 |
| Watford | Total | | 235 | 8 | 11 | 0 | 3 | 0 | — | | 262 | 8 |
| Career total | | | 372 | 14 | 16 | 0 | 4 | 0 | — | | 437 | 14 |

=== International ===
Appearances and goals by national team and year
| National team | Year | Apps | Goals |
|---|---|---|---|
| Northern Ireland | 2010 | 1 | 0 |
| Northern Ireland | 2011 | 8 | 0 |
| Northern Ireland | 2012 | 4 | 0 |
| Northern Ireland | 2013 | 4 | 0 |
| Northern Ireland | 2014 | 2 | 0 |
| Northern Ireland | 2015 | 5 | 1 |
| Northern Ireland | 2016 | 8 | 1 |
| Northern Ireland | 2017 | 1 | 0 |
| Northern Ireland | 2018 | 8 | 0 |
| Northern Ireland | 2019 | 9 | 0 |
| Northern Ireland | 2020 | 7 | 0 |
| Northern Ireland | 2021 | 10 | 0 |
| Northern Ireland | 2022 | 2 | 0 |
| Northern Ireland | 2023 | 4 | 0 |
| Total | | 73 | 2 |

Scores and results list Northern Ireland's goal tally first.

List of international goals scored by Craig Cathcart
| No. | Date | Venue | Opponent | Score | Result | Competition |
|---|---|---|---|---|---|---|
| 1 | 11 October 2015 | Helsinki Olympic Stadium, Helsinki, Finland | Finland | 1–0 | 1–1 | UEFA Euro 2016 qualification |
| 2 | 24 March 2016 | Cardiff City Stadium, Cardiff, Wales | Wales | 1–0 | 1–1 | Friendly |

== Honours ==
Watford

- FA Cup runner-up: 2018–19

Individual

- Jimmy Murphy Young Player of the Year: 2006–07
