= Glengormley High School =

Integrated College Glengormley
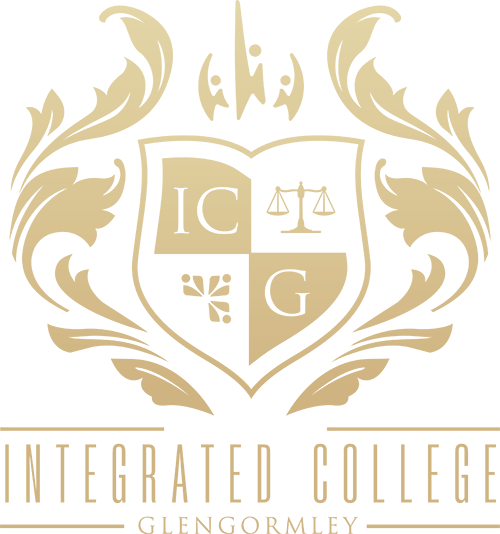

Address
- 134 Ballyclare Road, Newtownabbey; Newtownabbey, County Antrim BT36 5HP; Northern Ireland
- Coordinates: 54.680°N 5.964°W

Information
- Type: Secondary school
- Established: 1971
- Principal: Ricky Massey
- Website: integratedcollegeglengormley.com

Integrated College Glengormley is a secondary school in the town of Newtownabbey in County Antrim, Northern Ireland. It was opened in September 1971.

It is a non-selective school accepting children from all academic backgrounds. The school is situated approximately 15 minutes from Belfast City in a large suburb of Belfast. The grounds are extensive with three main teaching buildings, gardens, greenhouse, tennis and basketball courts, running track, rugby and football pitches. A new sixth form center has been added and also an indoor gym and sports hall.

The school received specialist status as an ICT Academy. It has close links with local primary schools and encourages pupils to volunteer within the community via the Duke of Edinburgh's Award scheme.

== Athletics ==
The school has a number of sports clubs including hockey, football and netball, A dance squad has been established. A number of ex-students have gone on to achieve sporting success including playing for Manchester United Football Club and representing Northern Ireland Under 21 netball.

== Notable former pupils ==
- Craig Cathcart, former Manchester Utd and Watford footballer and Northern Ireland international
- Carl Frampton, boxer
- Dean McCullough, radio presenter
- Jeremy McWilliams, motorcycle racer
- Andrew Mitchell, footballer for Rangers F.C. and a number of NIFL Premiership teams
- Chris Patterson, World Rally Championship co-driver/navigator for Petter Solberg
- Neil Sinclair, boxer
