= Juan Carlos Paredes =

Ecuadorian footballer (born 1987)

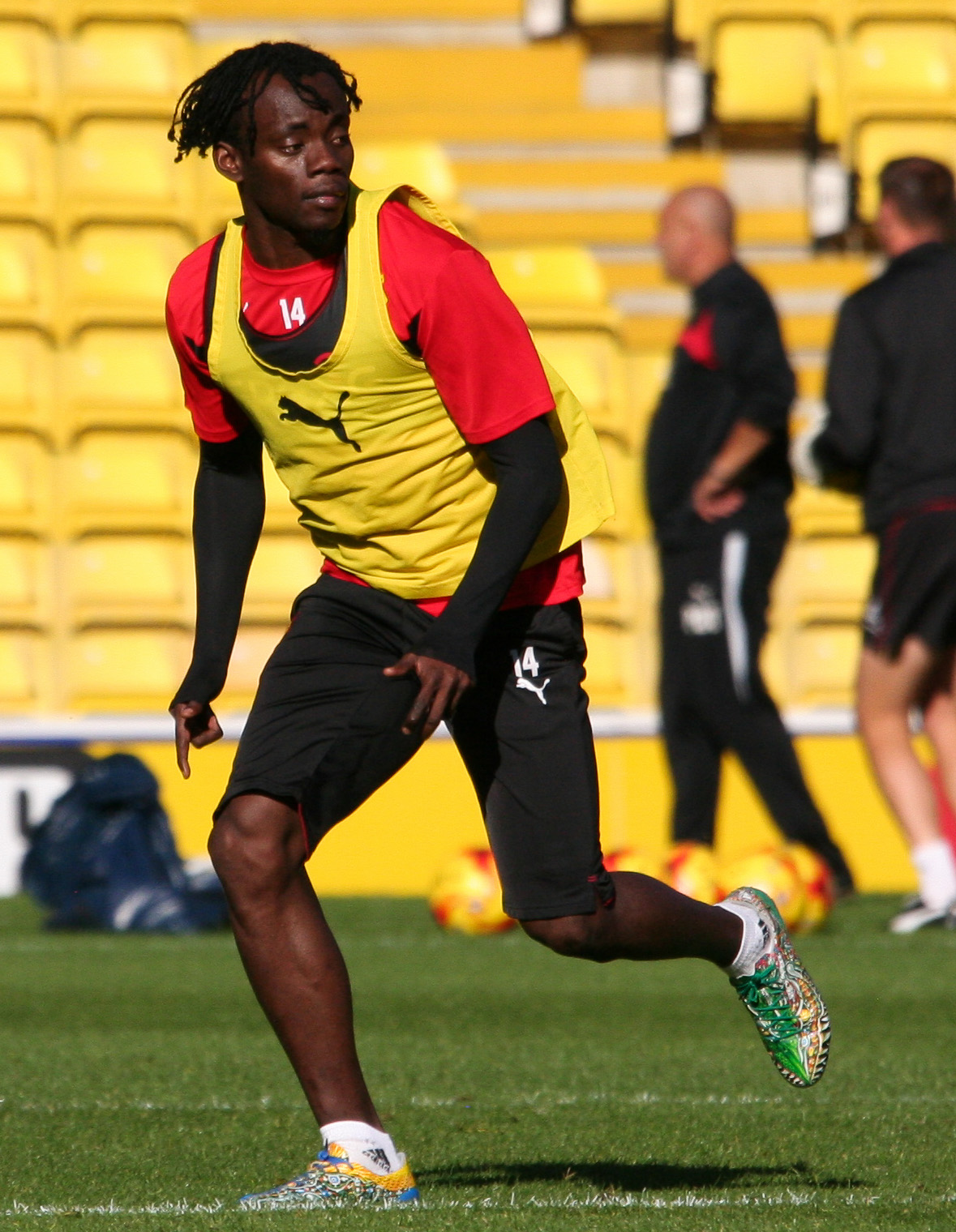
- Paredes in 2014

Personal information
- Full name: Juan Carlos Paredes Reasco
- Date of birth: 8 July 1987 (age 39)
- Place of birth: Esmeraldas, Ecuador
- Height: 1.79 m (5 ft 10 in)
- Positions: Full-back; wing-back; winger

Team information
- Current team: Santa Fe

Youth career
- 2007: Deportivo Cuenca

Senior career*
Years	Team	Apps	(Gls)
2004–2005	Huracán SC	5	(0)
2006	Barcelona SC	5	(0)
2007–2010	Deportivo Cuenca	32	(3)
2008	→ Rocafuerte (loan)	14	(3)
2010–2013	Deportivo Quito	95	(7)
2013–2014	Barcelona SC	43	(1)
2014	Granada	0	(0)
2014–2017	Watford	56	(0)
2017	→ Olympiacos (loan)	4	(0)
2017–2020	Emelec	56	(1)
2020–2021	El Nacional	21	(0)
2022–2024	Cumbayá	57	(3)
2025	Chachritas FC	1	(0)
2025	22 de Julio	17	(1)
2026–	Santa Fe	0	(0)

International career^{‡}
2010–2019	Ecuador	76	(0)
- * Club domestic league appearances and goals as of 20:52, 3 July 2020 (UTC) ‡ National team caps and goals as of 27 March 2019

Juan Carlos Paredes Reasco (born 8 July 1987) is an Ecuadorian professional footballer who plays as a right-back for Santa Fe.

A full international for the Ecuador national team since 2010, he has gained over 40 caps and represented the nation at the 2014 FIFA World Cup.

== Club career ==
Paredes started playing for Huracán SC. He was sought by Guayaquil's Barcelona a year later and signed a contract with them.

He then moved on to Deportivo Cuenca and was loaned out to Rocafuerte of Ecuador's third division. He helped the team gain promotion to the second division for the 2008–09 season.

=== Deportivo Cuenca ===
Paredes returned to Deportivo Cuenca for its Copa Libertadores campaign. He has been linked for a move to Serie A. In 2010, he moved to Deportivo Quito.

=== Deportivo Quito ===
Paredes was bought off by Deportivo Quito, where he played a few Copa Libertadores games and eventually ended up becoming Champions of the Ecuadorian Serie A in 2011, defeating Emelec in Home and Away finals.

=== Barcelona ===
Paredes, having impressed with his speed and ability, signed for Guayaquil side Barcelona for the 2013 Season. Typically playing as a winger at his last club, in Barcelona he was mainly used as a right fullback, which gained him experience to be Ecuador's starting fullback on numerous occasions.

=== Granada CF and Watford ===
On 16 July 2014, it was confirmed that Paredes had moved to Watford of the Championship from La Liga side Granada, with both sides owned by the same family. Paredes had only moved to Granada earlier in the summer, suggesting it was a move that was designed to benefit the English club. Subject to obtaining a work permit and gaining international clearance, he signed a five-year deal with Watford.

=== Olympiacos ===
Paredes was loaned to Super League Greece champions Olympiacos on 31 January 2017.

== International career ==
Paredes made his International debut against Mexico on 10 September 2010, in a 2–1 away win for Ecuador, which was seen as an overdue merit as part of supporters of his former Club, Deportivo Cuenca.

He was named in Ecuador's squad for the 2014 FIFA World Cup in Brazil, and played every minute of their campaign which ended in elimination from Group E.

== Career statistics ==
As of 29 June 2017

Appearances and goals by club, season and competition
Club	Season	League			National cup		League cup		Continental		Other		Total	
Club	Season	Division	Apps	Goals	Apps	Goals	Apps	Goals	Apps	Goals	Apps	Goals	Apps	Goals
Huracán SC	2004	Ecuadorian Segunda Categoría	0	0	—		—		—		2	2	2	2
Huracán SC	2005	Ecuadorian Segunda Categoría	5	0	—		—		—		14	7	19	7
Huracán SC	Total		5	0	—		—		—		16	9	21	9
Barcelona SC	2006	Ecuadorian Serie A	5	0	—		—		0	0	—		5	0
Rocafuerte (loan)	2008	Ecuadorian Segunda Categoría	14	3	—		—		—		15	8	29	10
Deportivo Cuenca	2009	Ecuadorian Serie A	32	3	—		—		10	0	—		42	3
Deportivo Quito	2010	Ecuadorian Serie A	38	4	—		—		5	0	—		43	4
Deportivo Quito	2011	Ecuadorian Serie A	36	3	—		—		2	0	—		38	3
Deportivo Quito	2012	Ecuadorian Serie A	19	0	—		—		12	0	—		31	0
Deportivo Quito	Total		93	7	—		—		19	0	—		112	7
Barcelona SC	2013	Ecuadorian Serie A	35	1	—		—		5	0	—		40	1
Barcelona SC	2014	Ecuadorian Serie A	8	0	—		—		0	0	—		8	0
Barcelona SC	Total		43	1	—		—		5	0	—		48	1
Watford	2014–15	Championship	39	0	1	0	0	0	—		—		40	0
Watford	2015–16	Premier League	17	0	2	0	1	0	—		—		20	0
Watford	2016–17	Premier League	0	0	0	0	1	0	—		—		1	0
Watford	Total		56	0	3	0	2	0	—		—		61	0
Olympiacos (loan)	2016–17	Super League Greece	4	0	1	0	0	0	0	0	—		5	0
Emelec	2017	Ecuadorian Serie A	17	0	—		—		—		—		17	0
Emelec	2018	Ecuadorian Serie A	35	1	—		—		6	0	—		41	1
Emelec	2019	Ecuadorian Serie A	4	0	—		—		1	0	—		5	0
Emelec	Total		56	1	—		—		7	0	—		63	1
Career total			308	15	4	0	2	0	41	0	41	17	386	31

== Honours ==
Deportivo Quito

- Ecuadorian Serie A: 2011
