= Gueye =

Gueye or Guèye is a surname, common among Senegalese people and their descendants. Notable people with the surname include:

- Abbas Gueye (1913–1999), Senegalese politician
- Abdou Latif Guèye (1956–2008), Senegalese politician
- Alioune Gueye (born 1987), Senegalese footballer
- Aminata Gueye (born 2002), French basketball player
- Amdy Gueye (born 1980), Senegalese footballer
- Awa Gueye (born 1978), Senegalese women's basketball player
- Babacar Gueye (born 1986), Senegalese footballer
- Cheikh Gueye (born 1986), Senegalese footballer
- Ibrahima Gueye (born 1978), Senegalese footballer
- Idrissa Gueye (born 1989), Senegalese footballer
- Lamine Guèye (1891–1968), Senegalese politician
- Lamine Guèye (skier) (born 1960), Senegalese skier
- Magaye Gueye (born 1990), French footballer
- Mamadou Gueye (jumper) (born 1986), Senegalese athlete
- Médoune Gueye (born 1982), French footballer
- Mouhamadou Gueye (born 1998), American basketball player
- Mouhamed Gueye (born 2002), Senegalese basketball player
- Moussa Gueye (born 1989), Senegalese footballer
- Moussa Khoume Gueye (born 1985), Senegalese footballer
- Ndiatte Gueye (born 1985), Senegalese sprint canoeist
- Papa Gueye (born 1984), Senegalese footballer
- Youssouf Gueye (1928–1988), Mauritanian writer
- Zakaria Gueye (born 1986), Senegalese footballer
