= Amdy Gueye =

Senegalese footballer (born 1980)

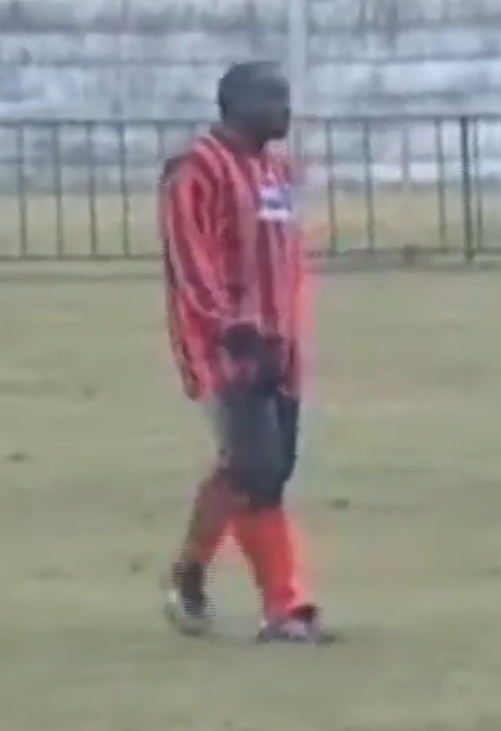
- Gueye in 2009

Personal information
- Full name: Cheikh Amdy Gueye
- Date of birth: 22 August 1980 (age 46)
- Place of birth: Dakar, Senegal
- Height: 1.89 m (6 ft 2 1/2 in)
- Position: Centre back

Senior career*
Years	Team	Apps	(Gls)
–2007	ASC Jeanne d'Arc		
2008–2009	Spartak Trnava	19	(2)
- * Club domestic league appearances and goals

Cheikh Amdy Gueye (born 22 August 1980 in Dakar; better known as Amdy Gueye) is a Senegalese former football defender who is most known for playing for Slovak First Football League side FC Spartak Trnava.

Gueye began his career with Senegalese club Jeanne d'Arc in Dakar in 2001, where he remained until 2008. He competed with the club in the CAF Champions League during the 2002 edition, appearing in three matches.

He trialed with Spartak Trnava in 2008 after being scouted in Senegal. In little less than a year Gueye played 19 games in the league and 4 in the Europa League, scoring twice. He would eventually be released by Spartak after unimpressive performances.

== Club career ==
=== ASC Jeanne d'Arc ===
In the 2002 CAF Champions League, Gueye made three appearances for ASC Jeanne d'Arc, scoring two goals in group stage matches against Al Ahly SC and TP Mazembe. He went on to help the club secure three consecutive league titles in 2001, 2002, and 2003. He would later play for ASC St. Louis Stars.

=== Trial to Spartak Trnava ===
In the winter of 2008, Gueye officially joined Slovak club Spartak Trnava on trial, joining with four other Senegalese players. Gueye made his debut for Spartak in the first round of qualification in the 2009–10 UEFA Europa League, playing the full match in a 2–1 win against Inter Baku. He also played in the second leg, helping Spartak win 3–1 and advance to the second round of the competition, where they were then knocked out by FK Sarajevo on aggregate.

In a traditional derby match against ŠK Slovan Bratislava, Gueye was subjected to racist abuse from home fans of Slovan Bratislava. About a dozen people allegedly addressed racist insults to the Senegalese player such as "monkey" or "go back to the tree where you have a banana". According to the association, Slovan fans responded to his play with racist boos and a torn-off seat was also thrown at the player. The incident was documented and highlighted by anti-racism organization Ľudia proti rasizmu as part of broader concerns over discrimination in Slovak football. In a league match against Artmedia Petrzalka, Gueye received a red card and would be suspended for the next two matches. He scored his first goal for the club in a 2–1 away loss to DAC Dunajska Streda, scoring in the 77th minute.

The officials of Spartak Trnava reached an agreement with the Senegalese defender on November 27, 2009, to terminate his professional contract. From the four Senegalese players that joined Spartak Trnava on trial, Gueye was the last to leave.
