= Youssouf Gueye =

Mauritanian French language poet and historian (1928-1988)

Tène Youssouf Gueye (1928 in Kaédi – 1988) was a Mauritanian French language poet and historian.

He was President of the Mauritanian Writers Association and became an important civil servant after the independence of his country. He was in prison because of his critical opinions against the Mauritanian government; he died there in 1988.

== Works ==
- Les exilés du Goumel, play, 1968
- A l'orée du Sahel, stories, 1975
- Sahéliennes, poems, 1975
- Rella, 1985
