= 2007–08 in Belgian football =

Football season

Football in Belgium
- Season: 2007–08

The 2007–08 football season in Belgium, which is the 105th season of competitive football in the country.

== Honours ==
Competition	Winner
First division	Standard Liège
Second division	Kortrijk
Third division A	Ronse
Third division B	RFC Liège
Promotion A	Wielsbeke
Promotion B	Gent-Zeehaven
Promotion C	Hoogstraten
Promotion D	URS Centre
Cup	Anderlecht
Supercup	Standard Liège

== League competitions ==
=== Belgian First Division ===
Pos	Team	Pld	W	D	L	GF	GA	GD	Pts	Qualification or relegation
1	Standard Liège (C)	34	22	11	1	61	19	+42	77	Qualification to Champions League third qualifying round
2	Anderlecht	34	21	7	6	59	31	+28	70	Qualification to Champions League second qualifying round
3	Club Brugge	34	20	7	7	45	30	+15	67	Qualification to UEFA Cup first round
4	Cercle Brugge	34	17	9	8	62	33	+29	60	
5	Germinal Beerschot	34	16	7	11	46	34	+12	55	Qualification to Intertoto Cup second round
6	Gent	34	14	10	10	57	46	+11	52	Qualification to UEFA Cup second qualifying round
7	Zulte Waregem	34	13	8	13	47	54	−7	47	
8	Charleroi	34	13	7	14	41	45	−4	46	
9	Westerlo	34	12	9	13	43	37	+6	45	
10	Genk	34	12	9	13	54	55	−1	45	
11	Mouscron	34	12	6	16	38	43	−5	42	
12	Lokeren	34	9	15	10	32	33	−1	42	
13	Mechelen	34	10	10	14	45	52	−7	40	
14	Roeselare	34	9	11	14	36	55	−19	38	
15	Dender	34	9	6	19	33	59	−26	33	
16	Mons	34	7	12	15	37	45	−8	33	
17	Sint-Truiden (R)	34	6	9	19	32	58	−26	27	Relegation to 2008–09 Belgian Second Division
18	Brussels (R)	34	4	7	23	27	66	−39	19	Relegation to 2008–09 Belgian Second Division

Source: Jupiler League
Rules for classification: 1) points; 2) number of matches won; if teams are still tied a playoff is organised.
(C) Champions; (R) Relegated

=== Belgian Second Division ===
Pos	Team	Pld	W	D	L	GF	GA	GD	Pts	Promotion or relegation
1	Kortrijk (C, P)	36	23	7	6	73	35	+38	76	Belgian First Division
2	Tubize (P)	36	19	9	8	49	29	+20	66	Belgian Second Division final round
3	OH Leuven	36	18	7	11	61	42	+19	61	Belgian Second Division final round
4	KVSK United	36	16	12	8	51	36	+15	60	Belgian Second Division final round
5	Antwerp	36	16	11	9	64	38	+26	59	Belgian Second Division final round
6	Virton	36	15	11	10	56	44	+12	56	
7	Lierse	36	15	8	13	47	36	+11	53	
8	Hamme	36	14	7	15	54	45	+9	49	
9	Beveren	36	14	6	16	48	56	−8	48	
10	Tienen	36	13	9	14	49	51	−2	48	
11	Olympic Charleroi	36	13	7	16	40	53	−13	46	
12	Tournai	36	12	10	14	34	37	−3	46	
13	Eupen	36	11	12	13	45	49	−4	45	
14	Waasland	36	10	13	13	46	47	−1	43	
15	Deinze	36	10	13	13	44	58	−14	43	
16	Oostende	36	11	9	16	44	59	−15	42	
17	UR Namur	36	10	12	14	51	63	−12	42	Relegation to Belgian Third Division Final Round
18	Union Saint-Gilloise (R)	36	11	7	18	48	61	−13	40	Relegation to Belgian Third Division
19	Geel (R)	36	4	4	28	33	98	−65	16	Relegation to Belgian Third Division

Source: Belgian Second Division
Rules for classification: 1) points; 2) number of matches won; if teams are still tied a playoff is organised.
(C) Champions; (P) Promoted; (R) Relegated

== European Club Results ==
Note that the Belgian team's score is given first

This season, Gent played in the Intertoto Cup and got eliminated in the final round. Likewise Genk got beaten in the second qualifying round of the Champions League, while Anderlecht got knocked out of that same tournament in the third qualifying round which allowed them to take part in the UEFA Cup together with Standard Liège and Club Brugge. In the UEFA Cup, Anderlecht managed to get the furthest, namely into the last 16.

Date	Team	Competition	Round	Leg	Opponent	Location	Score
July 7	Gent	Intertoto Cup	Round 2	Leg 1, Home	(Northern Ireland) Cliftonville	Jules Ottenstadion, Ghent	2-0
July 14	Gent	Intertoto Cup	Round 2	Leg 2, Away	(Northern Ireland) Cliftonville	Windsor Park, Belfast	4-0
July 21	Gent	Intertoto Cup	Round 3	Leg 1, Home	(Denmark) Aalborg	Jules Ottenstadion, Ghent	1-1
July 29	Gent	Intertoto Cup	Round 3	Leg 2, Away	(Denmark) Aalborg	Energi Nord Arena, Aalborg	1-2
July 31	Genk	Champions League	Qual. Round 2	Leg 1, Home	(Bosnia and Herzegovina) Sarajevo	Cristal Arena, Genk	1-2
August 8	Genk	Champions League	Qual. Round 2	Leg 2, Away	(Bosnia and Herzegovina) Sarajevo	Asim Ferhatović Hase Stadium, Sarajevo	1-0
August 15	Anderlecht	Champions League	Qual. Round 3	Leg 1, Away	(Turkey) Fenerbahçe	Şükrü Saracoğlu Stadium, Istanbul	0-1
August 16	Standard Liège	UEFA Cup	Qual. Round 2	Leg 1, Away	(Luxembourg) Käerjeng	Stade Josy Barthel, Luxembourg	3-0
August 29	Anderlecht	Champions League	Qual. Round 3	Leg 2, Home	(Turkey) Fenerbahçe	Constant Vanden Stock Stadium, Anderlecht	0-2
August 30	Standard Liège	UEFA Cup	Qual. Round 2	Leg 2, Home	(Luxembourg) Käerjeng	Stade Maurice Dufrasne, Liège	1-0
September 20	Anderlecht	UEFA Cup	Round 1	Leg 1, Home	(Austria) Rapid Wien	Constant Vanden Stock Stadium, Anderlecht	1-1
September 20	Club Brugge	UEFA Cup	Round 1	Leg 1, Away	(Norway) Brann	Brann Stadion, Bergen	1-0
September 20	Standard Liège	UEFA Cup	Round 1	Leg 1, Away	(Russia) Zenit St. Petersburg	Petrovsky Stadium, Saint Petersburg	0-3
October 4	Anderlecht	UEFA Cup	Round 1	Leg 2, Away	(Austria) Rapid Wien	Gerhard Hanappi Stadium, Vienna	1-0
October 4	Club Brugge	UEFA Cup	Round 1	Leg 2, Home	(Norway) Brann	Jan Breydel Stadium, Bruges	1-2
October 4	Standard Liège	UEFA Cup	Round 1	Leg 2, Home	(Russia) Zenit St. Petersburg	Stade Maurice Dufrasne, Liège	1-1
October 25	Anderlecht	UEFA Cup	Group Stage	Match 1, Home	(Israel) Hapoel Tel Aviv	Constant Vanden Stock Stadium, Anderlecht	2-0
November 8	Anderlecht	UEFA Cup	Group Stage	Match 2, Away	(Denmark) Aalborg	Energi Nord Arena, Aalborg	1-1
December 6	Anderlecht	UEFA Cup	Group Stage	Match 3, Home	(England) Tottenham Hotspur	Constant Vanden Stock Stadium, Anderlecht	1-1
December 19	Anderlecht	UEFA Cup	Group Stage	Match 4, Away	(Spain) Getafe	Coliseum Alfonso Pérez, Getafe	1-2
February 13	Anderlecht	UEFA Cup	Round of 32	Leg 1, Home	(France) Bordeaux	Constant Vanden Stock Stadium, Anderlecht	2-1
February 21	Anderlecht	UEFA Cup	Round of 32	Leg 2, Away	(France) Bordeaux	Stade Chaban-Delmas, Bordeaux	1-1
March 6	Anderlecht	UEFA Cup	Round of 16	Leg 1, Home	(Germany) Bayern Munich	Constant Vanden Stock Stadium, Anderlecht	0-5
March 12	Anderlecht	UEFA Cup	Round of 16	Leg 2, Away	(Germany) Bayern Munich	Allianz Arena, Munich	2-1

== European qualification for 2008-09 summary ==
Competition	Qualifiers	Reason for Qualification
UEFA Champions League Third Qualifying Round	Standard Liège	1st in Jupiler League
UEFA Champions League Second Qualifying Round	Anderlecht	2nd in Jupiler League
UEFA Cup First Round	Club Brugge	3rd in Jupiler League
UEFA Cup Second Qualifying Round	Gent	Losing Cup finalist
UEFA Intertoto Cup 2nd Round	Germinal Beerschot	Highest Jupiler League finishers (5th) to have entered and not qualified for any other European competition. Cercle Brugge (4th) did not want to participate.

== Deaths ==
- Constant Vanden Stock, 93, honorary president, former president and player of Anderlecht died by natural causes on April 19, 2008. He also managed the Belgium national team for ten years, is the father of current Anderlecht president Roger Vanden Stock and has the Anderlecht stadium named after him.
- François Sterchele, 26, the forward of Club Brugge died in a single-person car accident on May 8, 2008.
- Victor Wégria, 71, former player and trainer of RFC Liège is one of the best players in the history of the club. He was four times top scorer in the Belgian top division (in 1959, 1960, 1961 and 1963) and was capped five times by the Belgium national football team. He died by natural causes on June 6, 2008

== See also ==
- Jupiler League 2007-08
- Belgian Cup 2007-08
- 2008 Belgian Super Cup
- Belgian Second Division
- Belgian Third Division A
- Belgian Third Division B
