= Paolo De Toffol =

Italian footballer (born 1961)

Personal information
- Date of birth: June 28, 1961 (age 65)
- Place of birth: Italy
- Position: Goalkeeper

Senior career*
Years	Team	Apps	(Gls)
1980–1981	Belluno		
1981–1982	Padova	22	(0)
1982–1983	Monza	20	(0)
1983–1984	Padova	2	(0)
1984–1985	SPAL	11	(0)
1985–1986	Padova	1	(0)
1986–1988	Monopoli	68	(0)
1988–1989	Casarano	22	(0)
1989–1992	Catanzaro	88	(0)
1992–1994	Baracca Lugo	55	(0)
1994–1995	Giorgione	29	(0)
1995–1996	Cittadella	3	(0)
- * Club domestic league appearances and goals

Paolo De Toffol (born 28 June 1961) is an Italian former footballer.

== Early life ==
De Toffol was born in 1961 in Italy. He is a native of Belluno, Italy.

== Career ==
De Toffol started his career with Italian side Belluno. He helped the club win the league. In 1981, he signed for Italian side Padova. In 1982, he signed for Italian side Padova. In 1983, he signed for Italian side Monza. In 1983, he returned to Italian side Padova. In 1986, he signed for Italian side Monopoli. In 1988, he signed for Italian side Casarano. In 1989, he signed for Italian side Catanzaro. In 1992, he signed for Italian side Baracca Lugo. In 1994, he signed for Italian side Giorgione. In 1995, he signed for Italian side Cittadella.

== Personal life ==
De Toffol is the uncle of Italian footballer Setotaw De Toffol.
