= Joe Worrall (footballer) =

English footballer (born 1997)

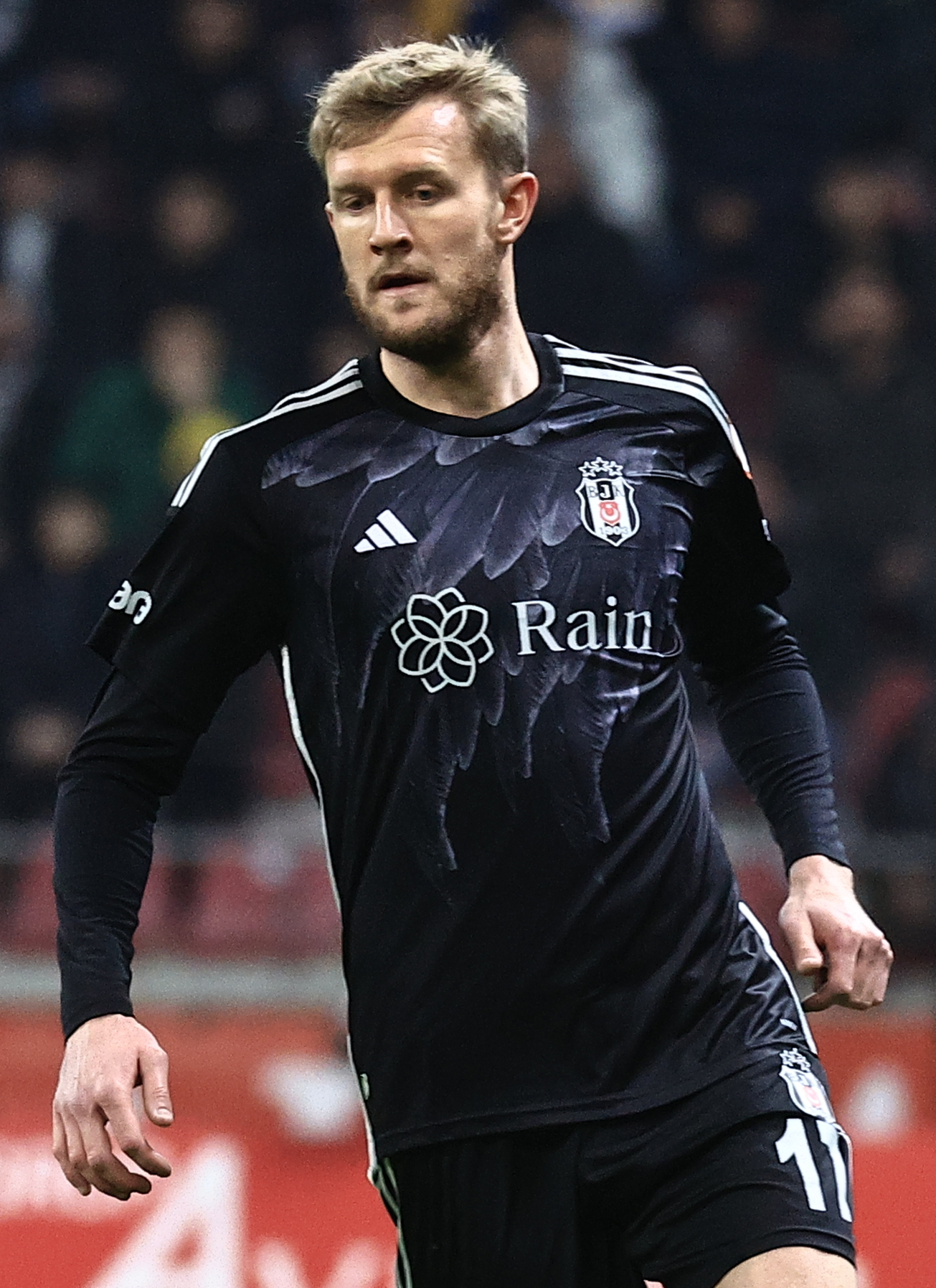
- Worrall with Beşiktaş in 2024

Personal information
- Full name: Joseph Adrian Worrall
- Date of birth: 10 January 1997 (age 29)
- Place of birth: Nottingham, England
- Height: 6 ft 4 in (1.93 m)
- Position: Centre-back

Team information
- Current team: Wrexham
- Number: 6

Youth career
- 2011–2016: Nottingham Forest

Senior career*
Years	Team	Apps	(Gls)
2016–2024	Nottingham Forest	205	(4)
2016	→ Dagenham & Redbridge (loan)	14	(1)
2018–2019	→ Rangers (loan)	22	(0)
2024	→ Beşiktaş (loan)	6	(1)
2024–2026	Burnley	20	(0)
2026–	Wrexham	3	(1)

International career
2017	England U20	4	(0)
2017	England U21	3	(0)
- * Club domestic league appearances and goals as of 02:58, 22 October 2026 (UTC)

Joseph Adrian Worrall (born 10 January 1997) is an English professional footballer who plays as a centre-back for EFL Championship club Wrexham.

A product of the Nottingham Forest academy, Worrall signed professionally for the club in early 2016. He immediately moved on loan to Dagenham & Redbridge, and upon returning to Forest at the start of the 2016–17 season, made his senior debut in October 2016. After a loan move to Rangers in 2018, Worrall once again returned to Forest. In 2022, he was appointed captain of the club, and later moved to Beşiktaş on loan in January 2024. He then departed the club to join Burnley in the summer.

== Early and personal life ==
Worrall was born on 10 January 1997 in Nottingham. He started playing football for Kimberley Miners Welfare F.C. at the age of eight, before playing for Priory Celtic when moving to Watnall and Hucknall Sports when moving to Hucknall.

On 29 August 2023, Worrall's uncle, Sgt. Graham Saville, died in hospital after being struck by a train five days prior in an attempt to save a man in distress. The following day in Forest's EFL Cup second round fixture at home to Burnley, a one-minute's applause was held in his honour before kick-off by players, staff and fans.

== Club career ==
=== Nottingham Forest ===
==== Beginnings and loan to Dagenham & Redbridge ====
Worrall signed with Nottingham Forest in October 2011, rejecting interest from other local sides, Derby County and Leicester City. Worrall joined League Two club Dagenham & Redbridge on 8 January 2016 on a one-month loan deal. He made his professional debut the next day in a third-round FA Cup tie against Everton, which Dagenham & Redbridge lost 2–0, and scored his first professional goal on 23 January in a 2–2 draw away to Newport County. Worrall made his first-team debut for Forest on 29 October 2016 at Reading and, despite losing the game 2–0, his performance was praised as "strong" and "decisive" by the Nottingham Post. He revealed that he had been frustrated with the quality of Forest's defending that season and pulled manager Philippe Montanier aside to ask for a chance in the first team. Montanier simply replied "OK, you play against Reading on Saturday".

On 19 November, Worrall started alongside Damien Perquis and Matt Mills in a three-man defence as Forest earned their first away win and clean sheet of the season at Ipswich Town. His performance led to Worrall being included in the Football League's Team of the Week and comparisons to former Forest and England defender Michael Dawson. He also received praise from manager Philippe Montanier, who described the centre-back as "strong and tall, but very clever too, tactically". Worrall's performances were noticed by Premier League clubs, with Everton and Stoke City reportedly tracking the centre-back. On 27 February 2017, Worrall signed a three-and-a-half-year contract to extend his stay with Nottingham Forest until 2020. Then later that year, after his success with England at the Toulon Tournament, he signed a further extension until 2022.

==== Loan to Rangers ====
On 31 August 2018, Worrall joined Scottish Premiership club Rangers on loan until the end of the 2018–19 season. Worrall did not wish to go out on loan, and turned down a move to Ipswich Town, but Forest manager Aitor Karanka insisted that he needed more experience.

==== Return from loan and becoming club captain ====
Following his loan spell at Rangers, Worrall became a key player in the Nottingham Forest side under new manager Sabri Lamouchi, with the defender starting every league game of the 2019–20 season. He signed a four-year contract extension in February 2020.

During the 2021–22 season, Worrall regularly captained the Forest side during Lewis Grabban's absence through injury. He scored against rivals Leicester City during a 4–1 FA Cup win. He played a key role in Forest's promotion to the Premier League and captained them in their 1–0 play-off final victory over Huddersfield Town at Wembley. Worrall was also featured in that season's EFL Championship Team of the Season alongside teammates Ryan Yates and Djed Spence.

On 4 August 2022, Worrall was named Forest's captain for their season in the 2022–23 Premier League.

==== Loan to Beşiktaş ====
On 5 February 2024, Worrall was loaned to Turkish side Beşiktaş for the remainder of the 2023–24 season.

=== Burnley ===
On 22 August 2024, Worrall ended his 13-year association with Nottingham Forest and signed a four-year deal with EFL Championship side Burnley for an undisclosed transfer fee.

=== Wrexham ===
On 1 September 2026, Worrall signed for Wrexham on a two-year contract.

On 17 October 2026, he scored his first goal for the club in a 4–1 league win over bottom-dwellers Preston North End at the Racecourse Ground.

== International career ==
On 19 May 2017, Worrall was called up to the England representative squad for the 2017 Toulon Tournament as a replacement for Charlton Athletic's Ezri Konsa, who had been promoted to the U20 squad for the 2017 FIFA U-20 World Cup. Appointed as the team's captain, Worrall played four times and lifted the trophy as England defended their title on penalties after a 1–1 draw with the Ivory Coast in the final. Worrall was named the second-best player of the tournament after teammate David Brooks, who won the award.

Following his impressive summer with England, Worrall received his first call-up to the U21 squad on 24 August 2017 for their upcoming qualifying matches against their Dutch and Latvian counterparts. Worrall was, however, left out of the squad against the Dutch and was an unused substitute in his team's 3–0 win over Latvia on 5 September.

== Career statistics ==
As of match played 17 October 2026

Appearances and goals by club, season and competition
Club	Season	League			National cup (Note: Includes FA Cup, Scottish Cup, Turkish Cup)		League cup (Note: Includes EFL Cup, Scottish League Cup)		Europe		Other		Total	
Club	Season	Division	Apps	Goals	Apps	Goals	Apps	Goals	Apps	Goals	Apps	Goals	Apps	Goals
Nottingham Forest	2015–16	Championship	0	0	—		0	0	—		—		0	0
Nottingham Forest	2016–17	Championship	21	0	0	0	0	0	—		—		21	0
Nottingham Forest	2017–18	Championship	31	1	2	0	2	0	—		—		35	1
Nottingham Forest	2018–19	Championship	0	0	0	0	0	0	—		—		0	0
Nottingham Forest	2019–20	Championship	46	1	0	0	2	0	—		—		48	1
Nottingham Forest	2020–21	Championship	31	1	2	0	0	0	—		—		33	1
Nottingham Forest	2021–22	Championship	39	0	4	1	0	0	—		3 (Note: Appearances in Championship play-offs)	0	46	1
Nottingham Forest	2022–23	Premier League	30	1	0	0	4	0	—		—		34	1
Nottingham Forest	2023–24	Premier League	7	0	2	0	0	0	—		—		9	0
Nottingham Forest	Total		205	4	10	1	8	0	—		3	0	226	5
Dagenham and Redbridge (loan)	2015–16	League Two	14	1	1	0	—		—		—		15	1
Rangers (loan)	2018–19	Scottish Premiership	22	0	4	1	2	0	4 (Note: Appearances in UEFA Europa League)	0	—		32	1
Beşiktaş (loan)	2023–24	Süper Lig	6	1	3	0	—		—		—		9	1
Burnley	2024–25	Championship	9	0	3	0	1	0	—		—		13	0
Burnley	2025–26	Premier League	11	0	0	0	2	0	—		—		13	0
Burnley	2026–27	Championship	0	0	—		1	0	—		—		1	0
Burnley	Total		20	0	3	0	4	0	—		—		27	0
Wrexham	2026–27	Championship	3	1	0	0	—		—		—		3	1
Career total			270	7	21	2	14	0	4	0	3	0	312	9

== Honours ==
Nottingham Forest

- EFL Championship play-offs: 2022

Beşiktaş

- Turkish Cup: 2023–24

England U20

- Toulon Tournament: 2017

Individual

- Nottingham Forest Player of the Season: 2020–21
- EFL Championship Team of the Season: 2021–22
