= Jordan Smith (English footballer) =

English footballer (born 1994)

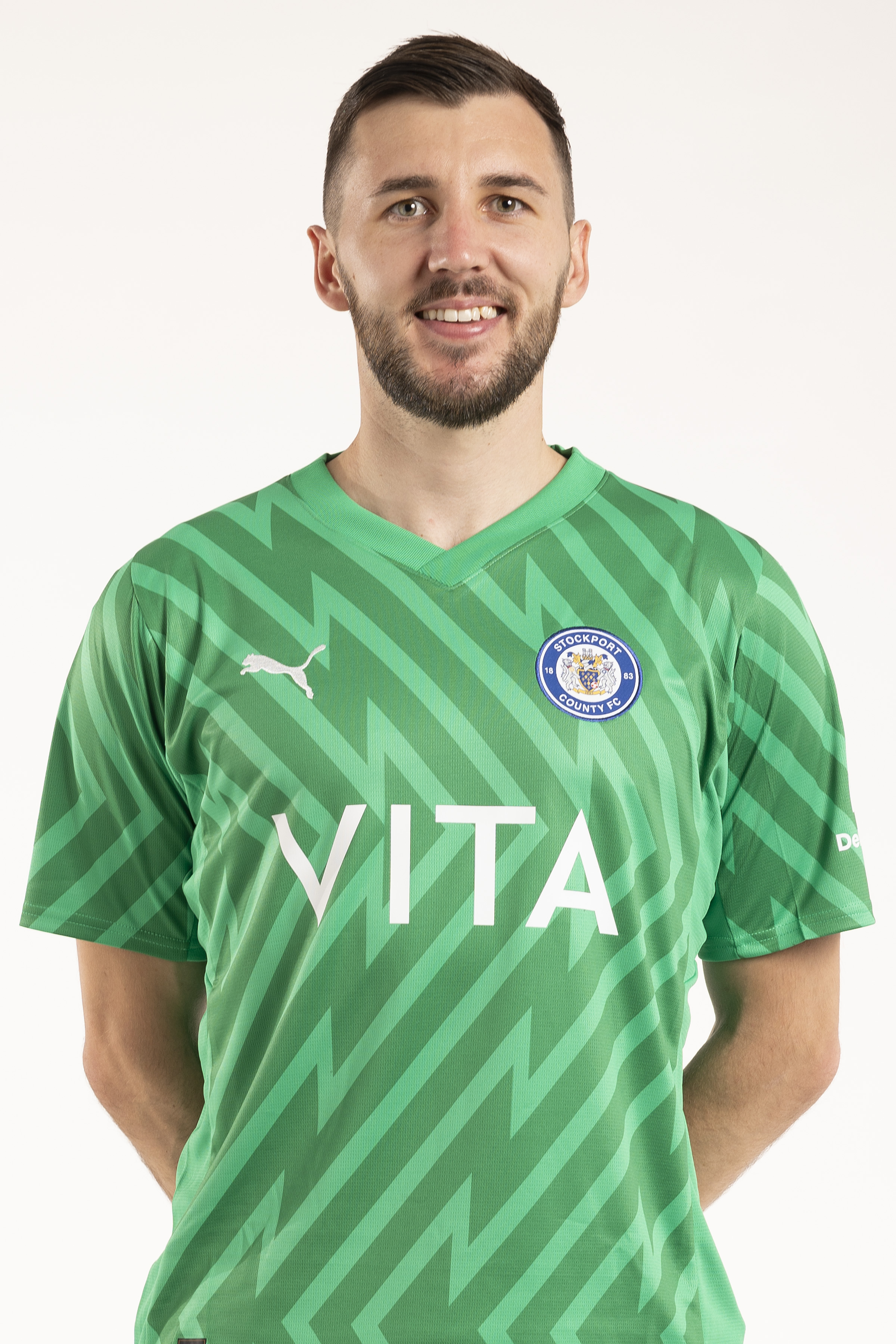
- Smith with Stockport County

Personal information
- Full name: Jordan Clifford Smith
- Date of birth: 8 December 1994 (age 31)
- Place of birth: South Normanton, England
- Height: 1.85 m (6 ft 1 in)
- Position: Goalkeeper

Team information
- Current team: Hibernian
- Number: 13

Youth career
- 2001–2016: Nottingham Forest

Senior career*
Years	Team	Apps	(Gls)
2013–2023	Nottingham Forest	47	(0)
2014–2015	→ Ilkeston (loan)	46	(0)
2015–2016	→ Nuneaton Town (loan)	42	(0)
2018	→ Barnsley (loan)	1	(0)
2019	→ Mansfield Town (loan)	12	(0)
2023	→ Huddersfield Town (loan)	0	(0)
2023–2024	Stockport County	0	(0)
2024–	Hibernian	31	(0)
- * Club domestic league appearances and goals as of 20 May 2026

Jordan Clifford Smith (born 8 December 1994) is an English professional footballer who plays as a goalkeeper for Scottish Premiership side Hibernian.

== Club career ==
=== Nottingham Forest ===
After coming through the Nottingham Forest academy, for whom he had played since the age of seven, Smith spent spells on loan with Ilkeston and Nuneaton Town. He made his professional debut for Forest on 11 February 2017, coming on as a 23rd-minute substitute against Norwich City for the injured Stephen Henderson. Smith kept his first clean sheet for Forest on 25 February as the club drew 0–0 at Wigan Athletic.

Having impressed in goal, Smith agreed a new contract with the club on 4 April to extend his stay until 2020. Smith's good form continued into the last game of the season at home to Ipswich Town when, with the score at 0–0, he made two vital saves; the latter of which was described by manager Mark Warburton as "world-class". Forest won the game 3–0 to guarantee safety from relegation to League One, at the expense of Blackburn Rovers.

Smith was released by Nottingham Forest following their 2022-23 season, ending his 22 years with the club.

==== Loan to Barnsley ====
On 16 November 2018, Smith joined EFL League One side Barnsley on a seven-day emergency loan.

==== Loan to Mansfield Town ====
On 10 January 2019, Smith joined EFL League Two side Mansfield Town until the end of the 2018–19 season.

==== Loan to Huddersfield Town ====
Following injury to goalkeeper Lee Nicholls and with young academy graduate Ryan Schofield joining Crawley Town on loan until the end of the season, Smith joined EFL Championship side Huddersfield Town on loan for the rest of the 2022–23 season. He featured in just one match day squad

=== Stockport County ===
Smith signed a one-year contract with EFL League Two side Stockport County on 12 July 2023.

=== Hibernian ===
Smith signed a two year contract with Scottish Premiership side Hibernian on 18 July 2024. He made his league debut on Tuesday 26 November against Aberdeen.

== Career statistics ==
As of match played 30 August 2025

Club	Season	League			FA Cup		League Cup		Other		Total	
Club	Season	Division	Apps	Goals	Apps	Goals	Apps	Goals	Apps	Goals	Apps	Goals
Nottingham Forest	2016–17	Championship	15	0	0	0	0	0	—		15	0
Nottingham Forest	2017–18	Championship	29	0	2	0	1	0	—		32	0
Nottingham Forest	2018–19	Championship	0	0	0	0	1	0	—		1	0
Nottingham Forest	2019–20	Championship	2	0	1	0	0	0	—		3	0
Nottingham Forest	2020–21	Championship	1	0	2	0	0	0	—		3	0
Nottingham Forest	2021–22	Championship	0	0	0	0	0	0	3	0	3	0
Nottingham Forest	2022–23	Premier League	0	0	0	0	0	0	1		1	0
Nottingham Forest	Total		47	0	5	0	2	0	4	0	58	0
Ilkeston (loan)	2014–15	Northern Premier League; Premier Division	46	0	3	0	—		11 (Note: One appearance in FA Trophy, five appearances in Northern Premier League Challenge Cup, three appearances in Derbyshire Senior Cup, two appearances in Northern Premier League Premier Division play-offs)	0	60	0
Nuneaton Town (loan)	2015–16	National League North	42	0	2	0	—		2 (Note: One appearance in FA Trophy, one appearance in Birmingham Senior Cup)	0	46	0
Barnsley (Emergency loan)	2018–19	League One	1	0	0	0	—		—		1	0
Mansfield Town (loan)	2018–19	League Two	12	0	0	0	—		—		12	0
Huddersfield Town (loan)	2022-23	Championship	0	0	0	0	—		—		0	0
Stockport county	2023-24	League Two	0	0	1	0	—		4		5	0
Hibernian	2024-25	Scottish Premiership	25	0	3	0	1	0	0	0	29	0
Hibernian	2025-26	Scottish Premiership	3	0	0	0	0	0	6	0	9	0
Hibernian	Total		28	0	3	0	1	0	6	0	38	0
Career total			176	0	14	0	3	0	23	0	221	0

== Honours ==
Nottingham Forest

- EFL Championship play-offs: 2022
