= George Shelvey =

English footballer

Personal information
- Full name: George William Shelvey
- Date of birth: 22 April 2001 (age 25)
- Place of birth: Nottingham, England
- Height: 1.88 m (6 ft 2 in)
- Position: Goalkeeper

Team information
- Current team: Gateshead
- Number: 41

Youth career
- Nottingham Forest

Senior career*
Years	Team	Apps	(Gls)
2019–2024	Nottingham Forest	0	(0)
2020	→ Truro City (loan)	2	(0)
2021	→ Wealdstone (loan)	5	(0)
2021–2022	→ Mansfield Town (loan)	0	(0)
2024	Dundalk	9	(0)
2025–	Gateshead	12	(0)
- * Club domestic league appearances and goals as of 15:24, 22 March 2026 (UTC)

George William Shelvey (born 22 April 2001) is an English professional footballer who plays as a goalkeeper for Gateshead.

== Career ==
Born in Nottingham, Shelvey began his career with Nottingham Forest, moving on loan to Truro City in February 2020, making 2 league appearances. He moved on loan to Wealdstone in April 2021. He moved on loan to Mansfield Town in June 2021. On 6 January 2022, Shelvey's loan with Mansfield was terminated early. On 16 May 2023, Shelvey signed a one-year extension with Forest to keep him at the club until the summer of 2024.

In February 2024 he signed for League of Ireland Premier Division club Dundalk. On 6 May 2024, he was sent off after the final whistle for abusing a match official with an anti-Irish slur after a 2–1 loss to Drogheda United, subsequently receiving a 10-game ban for breach of the FAI regulations on racism/discrimination. On 29 May, the club announced that Shelvey had left the club by mutual agreement.

In January 2025 he signed for Gateshead.

== Career statistics ==
As of 9 April 2025

Appearances and goals by club, season and competition
Club	Season	League			National Cup		League Cup		Other		Total	
Club	Season	Division	Apps	Goals	Apps	Goals	Apps	Goals	Apps	Goals	Apps	Goals
Nottingham Forest	2019–20	Championship	0	0	0	0	0	0	—		0	0
Nottingham Forest	2020–21	Championship	0	0	0	0	0	0	—		0	0
Nottingham Forest	2021–22	Championship	0	0	0	0	0	0	0	0	0	0
Nottingham Forest	2022–23	Premier League	0	0	0	0	0	0	—		0	0
Nottingham Forest	2023–24	Premier League	0	0	0	0	0	0	—		0	0
Nottingham Forest	Total		0	0	0	0	0	0	0	0	0	0
Truro City (loan)	2019–20	Southern League; Premier Division South	2	0	0	0	—		—		2	0
Wealdstone (loan)	2020–21	National League	5	0	0	0	—		—		5	0
Mansfield Town (loan)	2021–22	League Two	0	0	0	0	0	0	3 (Note: Appearances in the EFL Trophy.)	0	3	0
Dundalk	2024	LOI Premier Division	9	0	0	0	—		0	0	9	0
Gateshead	2024–25	National League	4	0	0	0	—		—		4	0
Career total			20	0	0	0	0	0	3	0	23	0
