= Brennan Johnson =

Wales international footballer (born 2001)

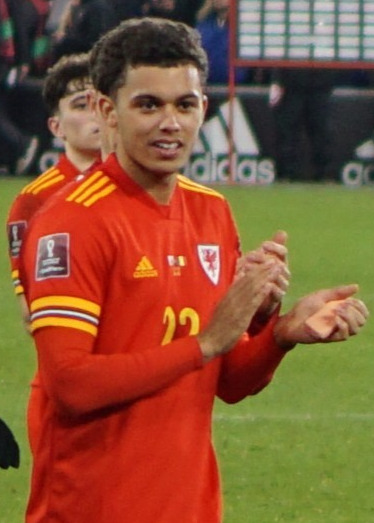
- Johnson with Wales in 2021

Personal information
- Full name: Brennan Price Johnson
- Date of birth: 23 May 2001 (age 25)
- Place of birth: Nottingham, England
- Height: 6 ft 1 in (1.86 m)
- Position: Winger

Team information
- Current team: Everton
- Number: 22

Youth career
- 2007–2009: Dunkirk
- 2009–2019: Nottingham Forest

Senior career*
Years	Team	Apps	(Gls)
2019–2023	Nottingham Forest	91	(24)
2020–2021	→ Lincoln City (loan)	40	(10)
2023–2025	Tottenham Hotspur	81	(18)
2026	Crystal Palace	18	(0)
2026–	Everton	10	(0)

International career^{‡}
2016–2017	England U16	5	(1)
2017	England U17	1	(0)
2018–2019	Wales U19	9	(2)
2019	Wales U21	4	(1)
2020–	Wales	51	(7)
- * Club domestic league appearances and goals as of 22:40, 6 November 2026 (UTC) ‡ National team caps and goals as of 22:13, 17 November 2026 (UTC)

Brennan Price Johnson (born 23 May 2001) is a professional footballer who plays as a winger for Premier League club Everton and the Wales national team.

Born in Nottingham, England, Johnson began his professional career with Nottingham Forest and helped the club achieve promotion to the Premier League in 2022. He joined Tottenham Hotspur in 2023, winning the UEFA Europa League in 2025 and scoring the deciding goal in the final. Johnson later signed for Crystal Palace, winning the UEFA Conference League, and then Everton in 2026.

At international level, Johnson played several matches for England youth sides before switching allegiance to Wales in 2018. He made his debut for the senior Welsh team in 2020, and represented the country at the 2022 FIFA World Cup.

== Early life ==
Brennan Price Johnson was born on 23 May 2001 in Nottingham, Nottinghamshire. He is the son of a Jamaican father, former footballer David Johnson, and Welsh mother, Alison Johnson. His maternal grandparents are from Rhayader, Wales. He grew up in West Bridgford, and attended Rushcliffe Spencer Academy. As a toddler, he attended St Giles Preschool, where his mother works.

== Club career ==
=== Nottingham Forest ===
After joining the Nottingham Forest academy from Dunkirk at eight years old, Johnson made his first-team debut aged 18, appearing on 3 August 2019 as an 88th-minute substitute in a 2–1 loss against West Bromwich Albion on the opening day of the season.

==== Loan to Lincoln City ====
On 25 September 2020, Johnson joined EFL League One club Lincoln City on a season-long loan. He made his debut two days later, coming off the bench against Charlton Athletic. On 20 October, he scored his first career goal in a 2–0 victory against Plymouth Argyle, heading in from close range. On 13 April 2021, Johnson scored his first career hat-trick in a span of 11 minutes as his side defeated Milton Keynes Dons 4–0. In the promotion play-offs at the end of the season, he scored in a 2–0 win over Sunderland in the first leg of the semi-finals on 19 May. Lincoln would reach the League One play-off final, though ultimately failed to earn promotion following a 2–1 defeat to Blackpool.

==== Return to Nottingham Forest ====
Johnson's first professional goal for Nottingham Forest came in a 1–1 draw against rivals Derby County on 28 August 2021. Forest experienced an upturn of form after the appointment of Steve Cooper, replacing Chris Hughton, and after scoring one goal and providing two assists in a month where Forest had three wins, Johnson was awarded the EFL Young Player of the Month award for September 2021. Johnson was awarded the EFL Championship Player of the Month award for April 2022 after his four goals and four assists helped Forest into the play-offs, narrowly missing out on automatic promotion. Johnson would play in all three games of the play-offs, and was the topscorer across all Championship play-off games, scoring once in each of the semi-final legs against Sheffield United. He also scored in the subsequent penalty shootout against Sheffield United, which took place as the teams were tied after both legs of the semi-final.

Johnson ended the season as Forest's top scorer with 19 goals in all competitions, including in both semi-final legs of their successful play-off campaign. He was named the EFL Championship Young Player of the Season. On 1 July 2022, he signed a new four-year contract with Nottingham Forest, which was set to expire in June 2026. Johnson played in every game in Nottingham Forest's return to the Premier League in 2022–23 as they avoided relegation, providing eight goals and three assists.

=== Tottenham Hotspur ===
==== 2023–24 ====
On 1 September 2023, Johnson signed for Premier League club Tottenham Hotspur on a six-year contract for a transfer fee of £47.5 million. He made his debut for Tottenham on 16 September 2023, in a 2–1 victory over Sheffield United. On 11 November, Johnson scored his first goal for Tottenham in the third minute of a 2–1 defeat away to Wolverhampton Wanderers.

Due to Tottenham players being away on international duty and a number of injuries in the squad, Johnson was awarded many opportunities in the starting lineup during the winter period of his first season. On 31 January 2024, Johnson would score his second goal for the club in a game against Brentford. His goal came only a minute after Tottenham's first goal of the match, scored by Destiny Udogie, and was the second of three goals to be scored within eight minutes. Tottenham Hotspur would win the match 3–2. On 10 February 2024, Johnson scored a stoppage-time winner for Tottenham Hotspur in their 2–1 home win against Brighton & Hove Albion, after joining the game as a 62nd-minute substitute for Timo Werner. Johnson was instrumental in Tottenham's 3–1 win over Crystal Palace on 2 March, where he assisted goals for Timo Werner and Son Heung-min.

Johnson finished the season with five goals and ten assists; his ten assists was the joint-most of any Spurs player.

==== 2024–25 ====
Following a 1–0 home loss to local rivals Arsenal on 15 September 2024, Johnson was subject to heavy amounts of online abuse, leading to the deactivation of his social media accounts. However, he quickly bounced back, and netted a late winner three days later against Coventry City in the third round of the EFL Cup, and went on to score a goal in seven consecutive games.

Johnson would suffer a calf injury during Tottenham's away clash against Arsenal on 15 January 2025, returning as a 64th-minute substitute during Tottenham's 1–0 home win against Manchester United on 16 February. Johnson would make his first start back from injury on the 22 February away at Ipswich Town, scoring twice within eight minutes.

Johnson scored within the first minute of the first leg of the UEFA Europa League semi-final against Bodø/Glimt on 1 May, which Spurs would win 3–1. He later scored the only goal in the final against Manchester United on 21 May, helping the club end their 17-year wait for a major trophy. Johnson would end the season as Tottenham's top scorer, scoring 18 goals in 51 appearances.

==== 2025–26 ====
Johnson was an unused substitute in Tottenham's defeat on penalties to Paris Saint-Germain in the 2025 UEFA Super Cup on 13 August 2025. He returned to the starting lineup for the opening games of the 2025–26 Premier League season, playing as a left winger and scoring in consecutive games against Burnley and Manchester City. He scored his first UEFA Champions League goal in a 4–0 home win against Copenhagen, a match in which he was later sent off for the first time in his career. This also made him the first British player to ever score and be sent off in the same Champions League match.

Under the management of Thomas Frank, who had replaced Ange Postecoglou prior to the start of the 2025–26 season, Johnson was primarily used as a substitute for Tottenham. New signing Mohammed Kudus replaced him as Spurs' starting right winger, with Johnson starting only three of the final 16 Premier League matches during his time at the club.

=== Crystal Palace ===
On 2 January 2026, Johnson was signed by fellow Premier League club Crystal Palace for a reported club record fee of £35 million. He was given the number 11 shirt, which was previously worn by Matheus França. He made his debut for the club on 4 January, starting and playing 72 minutes of a 2–0 loss to Newcastle United. He made 26 appearances in all competitions for Crystal Palace, scoring zero goals and registering two assists, and was an unused substitute as Palace won the 2026 UEFA Conference League final.

=== Everton ===
On 11 August 2026, Johnson joined Everton on a four-year contract as part of a straight swap deal that saw Dwight McNeil move to Crystal Palace. On 22 August, he made his Premier League debut for the club as a substitute in a 2–0 victory over former club Crystal Palace. On 26 August, he scored his first goal for Everton in a 4–0 win over Preston North End in the EFL Cup.

== International career ==
=== Youth career ===
Johnson played in international friendlies for the England under-16 and under-17 teams before switching to Wales in 2018. He played for the Wales under-19 team in the 2019 UEFA European Under-19 Championship qualifiers. His first competition goal for a Wales youth team was in his debut for the Wales under-21 team, in a 1–0 victory over the Belgium under-21 team on 6 September 2019, during the 2021 UEFA European Under-21 Championship qualifiers.

=== Senior career ===
In September 2020, Johnson was called up to the senior Wales squad for the first time. Johnson made his Wales debut in a 0–0 draw against the United States (US) on 12 November 2020. He made his first start for Wales against Finland on 1 September 2021, in which he was fouled and won a penalty. This chance was taken by Wales teammate Harry Wilson but blocked by Finland keeper Carljohan Eriksson. Johnson scored his first goal for Wales on 11 June 2022 in a 1–1 UEFA Nations League draw against Belgium.

In November 2022, Johnson was named in the Wales squad for the 2022 FIFA World Cup in Qatar. This was the first time the nation had qualified for the tournament since the 1958 FIFA World Cup. The team's first match of the campaign was a 1–1 draw against the US on 21 November 2022, where Johnson was substituted on for Neco Williams in the 78th minute. He made an attempt at goal from the right side of the box which was saved by US goalkeeper Matt Turner. Their next match was a 2–0 defeat to Iran, where Johnson was substituted onto the pitch for Connor Roberts in the 57th minute. The final match of the campaign for Wales was a 3–0 defeat against England. This was the Welsh men's national team's second time facing England in a major tournament, the first being six years prior in the UEFA Euro 2016, and Johnson's first time against the team. Johnson was substituted onto the field for Gareth Bale in the 46th minute. This ended Wales' World Cup 2022 campaign with Wales at the bottom of their group with 1 point.. On 26 March 2024, he missed one of the two penalties that Wales missed as Wales lost the shoot-out against Bosnia and Herzegovina in the FIFA World Cup 2026 qualifying play-off semi-final and failed to advance to the final tournament.

== Style of play ==
Johnson has been noted for his one-touch finishes at the back post, which sports journalist Liam Tharme of The Athletic has described as his 'trademark.'

== Career statistics ==
=== Club ===
As of match played 11 October 2026

Appearances and goals by club, season and competition
Club	Season	League			FA Cup		EFL Cup		Europe		Other		Total	
Club	Season	Division	Apps	Goals	Apps	Goals	Apps	Goals	Apps	Goals	Apps	Goals	Apps	Goals
Nottingham Forest	2019–20	Championship	4	0	1	0	3	0	—		—		8	0
Nottingham Forest	2020–21	Championship	0	0	—		0	0	—		—		0	0
Nottingham Forest	2021–22	Championship	46	16	4	1	0	0	—		3 (Note: Appearances in Championship play-offs)	2	53	19
Nottingham Forest	2022–23	Premier League	38	8	1	0	5	2	—		—		44	10
Nottingham Forest	2023–24	Premier League	3	0	—		1	0	—		—		4	0
Nottingham Forest	Total		91	24	6	1	9	2	—		3	2	109	29
Lincoln City (loan)	2020–21	League One	40	10	2	1	—		—		7 (Note: Four appearances and one goal in EFL Trophy, three appearances and one goal in League One play-offs)	2	49	13
Tottenham Hotspur	2023–24	Premier League	32	5	2	0	—		—		—		34	5
Tottenham Hotspur	2024–25	Premier League	33	11	1	1	4	1	13 (Note: Appearances in UEFA Europa League)	5	—		51	18
Tottenham Hotspur	2025–26	Premier League	16	2	—		2	1	4 (Note: Appearances in UEFA Champions League)	1	0	0	22	4
Tottenham Hotspur	Total		81	18	3	1	6	2	17	6	0	0	107	27
Crystal Palace	2025–26	Premier League	18	0	1	0	—		7 (Note: Appearances in UEFA Conference League)	0	—		26	0
Everton	2026–27	Premier League	6	0	0	0	2	1	—		—		8	1
Career total			236	52	12	3	17	5	23	6	11	4	299	70

=== International ===
As of match played 17 November 2026

Appearances and goals by national team and year
National team	Year	Apps	Goals
Wales	2020	1	0
Wales	2021	6	0
Wales	2022	11	2
Wales	2023	6	0
Wales	2024	9	3
Wales	2025	9	2
Wales	2026	9	0
Total		51	7

As of match played 18 November 2025
Scores and results list Wales' goal tally first, score column indicates score after each Johnson goal

List of international goals scored by Brennan Johnson
No.	Date	Venue	Cap	Opponent	Score	Result	Competition	Ref.
1	11 June 2022	Cardiff City Stadium, Cardiff, Wales	12	Belgium	1–1	1–1	2022–23 UEFA Nations League A	
2	14 June 2022	De Kuip, Rotterdam, Netherlands	13	Netherlands	1–2	2–3	2022–23 UEFA Nations League A	
3	21 March 2024	Cardiff City Stadium, Cardiff, Wales	25	Finland	3–1	4–1	UEFA Euro 2024 qualifying	
4	11 October 2024	Laugardalsvöllur, Reykjavik, Iceland	31	Iceland	1–0	2–2	2024–25 UEFA Nations League B	
5	19 November 2024	Cardiff City Stadium, Cardiff, Wales	33	Iceland	3–1	4–1	2024–25 UEFA Nations League B	
6	9 June 2025	King Baudouin Stadium, Brussels, Belgium	37	Belgium	3–3	4–3	2026 FIFA World Cup qualification	
7	18 November 2025	Cardiff City Stadium, Cardiff, Wales	42	North Macedonia	3–1	7–1	2026 FIFA World Cup qualification	

== Honours ==
Nottingham Forest

- EFL Championship play-offs: 2022

Tottenham Hotspur

- UEFA Europa League: 2024–25

Crystal Palace

- UEFA Conference League: 2025–26

Individual

- EFL Young Player of the Month: September 2021
- EFL Championship Young Player of the Season: 2021–22
- EFL Championship Player of the Month: April 2022
