= 2021–22 Nottingham Forest F.C. season =

English football club season

Nottingham Forest
2021–22 season
- Owner: Evangelos Marinakis
- Chairman: Nicholas Randall
- Manager: Chris Hughton (until 16 September); Steve Cooper (from 21 September)
- Stadium: City Ground
- Championship: 4th (promoted via play-offs)
- Play-offs: Winners
- FA Cup: Quarter-finals
- EFL Cup: Second round
- Top goalscorer: League: Brennan Johnson (16); All: Brennan Johnson (19)
- Highest home attendance: 29,293 (vs Birmingham City, EFL Championship, 9 April)
- Lowest home attendance: 23,830 (vs Middlesbrough, EFL Championship, 15 September)
- Average home league attendance: 27,176
Home colours	Away colours

The 2021–22 season was Nottingham Forest's 156th year in existence, and 14th consecutive season in the EFL Championship. Along with the league, the club also competed in the FA Cup and the EFL Cup. The season covered the period between 1 July 2021 and 30 June 2022.

== Managerial changes ==
On 16 September 2021 Chris Hughton was relieved from his managerial duties with immediate effect, after Forest started the season with only one point from their first seven games. Hughton was succeeded by former Swansea City manager Steve Cooper, who was named as first team head coach on 21 September.

== Players ==
As of 3 February 2022

No.	Player	Nationality	Date of birth (age)	Previous club	Joined first team	Contract ends
Goalkeepers
1	Ethan Horvath	(United States)	9 June 1995 (aged 27)	(Belgium) Club Brugge	2021	2024
12	Jordan Smith	(England)	8 December 1994 (aged 27)	Academy	2016	2023
30	Brice Samba	(France)	25 April 1994 (aged 28)	(France) Caen	2019	2023
Defenders
2	Djed Spence	(England)	9 August 2000 (aged 21)	(England) Middlesbrough	2021	2022
3	Tobias Figueiredo	(Portugal)	2 February 1994 (aged 28)	(Portugal) Sporting CP	2018	2022
4	Joe Worrall	(England)	10 January 1997 (aged 25)	Academy	2016	2024
6	Loïc Mbe Soh	(France)	13 June 2001 (aged 21)	(France) Paris Saint-Germain	2020	2024
13	Gaëtan Bong	(Cameroon)	25 April 1988 (aged 34)	(England) Brighton & Hove Albion	2020	2022
14	Richie Laryea	(Canada)	7 January 1995 (aged 27)	(Canada) Toronto FC	2022	2025
15	Max Lowe	(England)	11 May 1997 (aged 25)	(England) Sheffield United	2021	2022
24	Jonathan Panzo	(England)	25 October 2000 (aged 21)	(France) Dijon	2022	2025
26	Scott McKenna	(Scotland)	12 November 1996 (aged 25)	(Scotland) Aberdeen	2020	2024
27	Steve Cook	(England)	19 April 1991 (aged 31)	(England) Bournemouth	2022	2024
Midfielders
8	Jack Colback	(England)	24 October 1989 (aged 32)	(England) Newcastle United	2020	2023
11	Philip Zinckernagel	(Denmark)	16 December 1994 (aged 27)	(England) Watford	2021	2022
18	Cafú	(Portugal)	26 February 1993 (aged 29)	(Greece) Olympiacos	2020	2023
21	Braian Ojeda	(Paraguay)	27 June 2000 (aged 22)	(Paraguay) Olimpia	2021	2025
22	Ryan Yates	(England)	21 November 1997 (aged 24)	Academy	2016	2025
37	James Garner	(England)	13 March 2001 (aged 21)	(England) Manchester United	2021	2022
Forwards
7	Lewis Grabban	(England)	12 January 1988 (aged 34)	(England) Bournemouth	2018	2022
9	Keinan Davis	(England)	13 February 1998 (aged 24)	(England) Aston Villa	2022	2022
16	Sam Surridge	(England)	28 July 1998 (aged 23)	(England) Stoke City	2022	2024
17	Alex Mighten	(England)	11 April 2002 (aged 20)	Academy	2020	2025
19	Xande Silva	(Portugal)	16 March 1997 (aged 25)	(England) West Ham United	2021	2023
20	Brennan Johnson	(Wales)	23 May 2001 (aged 21)	Academy	2019	2023
23	Joe Lolley	(England)	25 August 1992 (aged 29)	(England) Huddersfield Town	2018	2023

== Pre-season and friendlies ==
Forest announced their pre-season schedule would include friendlies against Alfreton Town, Port Vale, Northampton Town, Crewe Alexandra, Aston Villa and Burnley.

10 July 2021 Friendly	Alfreton Town	1–2	Nottingham Forest XI	Alfreton
15:00 BST	Tuton 55'	Report	Johnson 18'; Swan 88'	Stadium: North Street; Attendance: 805

17 July 2021 Friendly	Port Vale	0–2	Nottingham Forest	Stoke-on-Trent
15:00 BST		Report	Mighten 13'; Colback 24'	Stadium: Vale Park; Attendance: 0
Note: Match played behind-closed-doors.

20 July 2021 Friendly	Northampton Town	0–2	Nottingham Forest	Northampton
19:45 BST		Report	Taylor 48'; Cafu 61'	Stadium: Sixfields Stadium; Attendance: 2,526

24 July 2021 Friendly	Crewe Alexandra	2–2	Nottingham Forest	Crewe
15:00 BST	Ainley 75'; Adebisi 79'	Report	Johnson 30', 56'	Stadium: Gresty Road; Attendance: 1,813

28 July 2021 Friendly	Aston Villa	v	Nottingham Forest	Bodymoor Heath
13:00 BST				Stadium: Bodymoor Heath Training Ground
Note: Fixture cancelled after a small number of positive cases of COVID-19 were identified in the Forest squad.

31 July 2021 Friendly	Nottingham Forest	v	Burnley	West Bridgford
15:00 BST				Stadium: City Ground
Note: Fixture cancelled after a small number of positive cases of COVID-19 were identified in the Forest squad.

== Competitions ==
=== EFL Championship ===
==== League table ====
Pos	Team	Pld	W	D	L	GF	GA	GD	Pts	Promotion, qualification or relegation
1	Fulham (C, P)	46	27	9	10	106	43	+63	90	Promotion to the Premier League
2	Bournemouth (P)	46	25	13	8	74	39	+35	88	Promotion to the Premier League
3	Huddersfield Town	46	23	13	10	64	47	+17	82	Qualification for Championship play-offs
4	Nottingham Forest (O, P)	46	23	11	12	73	40	+33	80	Qualification for Championship play-offs
5	Sheffield United	46	21	12	13	63	45	+18	75	Qualification for Championship play-offs
6	Luton Town	46	21	12	13	63	55	+8	75	Qualification for Championship play-offs
7	Middlesbrough	46	20	10	16	59	50	+9	70	

Source: EFL Official Website
Rules for classification: 1) Points; 2) Goal difference; 3) Number of goals scored; 4) Head-to-head results; 5) Wins; 6) Away goals; 7) Penalty points (sec 9.5); 8) 12-point sending off offences
(C) Champions; (O) Play-off winners; (P) Promoted

==== Results summary ====
Overall								Home						Away					
Pld	W	D	L	GF	GA	GD	Pts	W	D	L	GF	GA	GD	W	D	L	GF	GA	GD
46	23	11	12	73	40	+33	80	13	4	6	43	22	+21	10	7	6	30	18	+12

Last updated: 7 May 2022.

==== Results by matchday ====
Matchday	1	2	3	4	5	6	7	8	9	10	11	12	13	14	15	16	17	18	19	20	21	22	23	24	25	26	27	28	29	30	31	32	33	34	35	36	37	38	39	40	41	42	43	44	45	46
Ground	A	H	H	A	A	H	H	A	H	A	A	H	A	H	A	H	H	A	H	A	H	A	H	A	H	A	H	H	A	A	H	A	H	A	H	H	A	H	H	A	H	A	A	H	A	A
Result	L	L	L	L	D	L	L	W	D	W	W	W	W	L	D	D	W	D	D	D	W	W	W	L	L	W	W	W	L	W	D	D	W	D	W	W	W	W	W	L	W	W	W	W	L	D
Position	20	23	23	24	24	24	24	24	22	20	17	16	14	15	15	17	13	13	13	16	13	8	8	9	9	9	8	7	8	6	7	10	9	9	9	8	7	5	3	5	5	4	3	3	3	4

Updated to match(es) played on 7 May 2022. Source: https://www.bbc.com/sport/football/championship/table
A = Away; H = Home; W = Win; D = Draw; L = Loss

==== Matches ====
8 August 2021 1	Coventry City	2–1	Nottingham Forest	Coventry
16:30 BST	Sheaf (yellow card) 34'; McFadzean (yellow card) 49' (goal) 90+6'; Maatsen (yellow card) 55'; Hamer (yellow card) 61'; Gyökeres 81'	Report	Taylor 36' (yellow card) 58'	Stadium: Coventry Building Society Arena; Attendance: 20,843 (3,784 away); Referee: James Linington
Note: Live on Sky Sports

14 August 2021 2	Nottingham Forest	1–2	Bournemouth	West Bridgford
15:00 BST	McKenna 48' (yellow card) 90'; Colback (yellow card) 73'	Report	Mepham (yellow card) 16'; Brooks 28' (yellow card) 35' (yellow-red card) 60'; Billing 58'	Stadium: City Ground; Attendance: 25,035 (1,122 away); Referee: Geoff Eltringham

17 August 2021 3	Nottingham Forest	1–2	Blackburn Rovers	West Bridgford
19:45 BST	Colback (yellow card) 54'; Zinckernagel 69'; Gabriel (yellow card) 85' (yellow-red card) 90'	Report	Ayala 47'; Gallagher (yellow card) 66'; Carter (yellow card) 71'; Lenihan 86'; Brereton Díaz (yellow card) 90+2'	Stadium: City Ground; Attendance: 24,850 (886 away); Referee: Gavin Ward

21 August 2021 4	Stoke City	1–0	Nottingham Forest	Stoke-on-Trent
15:00 BST	Tymon 66'; Clucas (yellow card) 85'; Souttar (yellow card) 88'	Report	Figueiredo (yellow card) 28'; Samba (yellow card) 62'	Stadium: Bet365 Stadium; Attendance: 21,346 (2,679 away); Referee: Oliver Langford

28 August 2021 5	Derby County	1–1	Nottingham Forest	Derby
12:30 GMT	Lawrence 11'; Jóźwiak (yellow card) 39'; Morrison (yellow card) 68'; Byrne (yellow card) 80'; Sibley (yellow card) 83'	Report	Garner (yellow card) 35'; Johnson 82'	Stadium: Pride Park Stadium; Attendance: 22,991 (2,900 away); Referee: Tim Robinson
Note: Live on Sky Sports

12 September 2021 6	Nottingham Forest	1–2	Cardiff City	West Bridgford
14:30 GMT	Grabban 23'	Report	Vaulks (yellow card) 33'; Colwill 58', 73'; Ng (yellow card) 77'	Stadium: City Ground; Attendance: 24,153 (1,633 away); Referee: Dean Whitestone
Note: Live on Sky Sports

15 September 2021 7	Nottingham Forest	0–2	Middlesbrough	West Bridgford
19:45 BST	Yates (yellow card) 68'	Report	Šporar 24' (yellow card) 26'; Howson (yellow card) 45+1'; Peltier (yellow card) 50'; Crooks (yellow card) 62'; Hernández 72' (yellow card) 73'	Stadium: City Ground; Attendance: 23,830 (1,420 away); Referee: James Linington

18 September 2021 8	Huddersfield Town	0–2	Nottingham Forest	Huddersfield
15:00 BST	Ward (yellow card) 16'; Turton (yellow card) 61'	Report	Grabban 22'; Nicholls 48' (o.g.); Garner (yellow card) 68'	Stadium: The John Smith's Stadium; Attendance: 17,462 (1,951 away); Referee: Chris Kavanagh

25 September 2021 9	Nottingham Forest	1–1	Millwall	West Bridgford
15:00 BST	Lowe 52'; Figueiredo (yellow card) 55'; Worrall (yellow card) 82'	Report	Smith 32'; Kieftenbeld (yellow card) 78'; Afobe (yellow card) 82'; Ballard (yellow card) 85'	Stadium: City Ground; Attendance: 25,589 (1,284 away); Referee: Jeremy Simpson

29 September 2021 10	Barnsley	1–3	Nottingham Forest	Barnsley
19:45 BST	Woodrow 20' (pen.); Palmer (yellow card) 34'	Report	Zinckernagel 61'; Johnson 68'; Grabban 82'	Stadium: Oakwell; Attendance: 13,657 (2,158 away); Referee: Geoff Eltringham

2 October 2021 11	Birmingham City	0–3	Nottingham Forest	Birmingham
15:00 BST	Jutkiewicz (yellow card) 32'	Report	Grabban 11' (yellow card) 67'; Yates 29' (yellow card) 36'; Spence 53'; Lowe (yellow card) 59'	Stadium: St. Andrew's; Attendance: 15,148 (1,588 away); Referee: Keith Stroud

16 October 2021 12	Nottingham Forest	2–1	Blackpool	West Bridgford
15:00 BST	Zinckernagel (yellow card) 20'; Johnson 22'; Grabban 61'; McKenna (yellow card) 82'	Report	Yates 53'	Stadium: City Ground; Attendance: 27,946 (1,795 away); Referee: Kevin Friend

19 October 2021 13	Bristol City	1–2	Nottingham Forest	Bristol
19:45 BST	Scott 39' (yellow card) 66'	Report	Taylor 90+1' (pen.), 90+2'	Stadium: Ashton Gate; Attendance: 18,325 (1,514 away); Referee: Steve Martin

24 October 2021 14	Nottingham Forest	0–4	Fulham	West Bridgford
15:00 BST	Colback (yellow card) 16'; Zinckernagel (yellow card) 58'; Garner (yellow card) 65'; Yates (yellow card) 66'; Samba (yellow card) 67'	Report	Spence 7' (o.g.); Ream (yellow card) 38'; Odoi (yellow card) 45'; Mitrović 58', 67' (pen.); Kebano 61'; Robinson (yellow card) 69'; Wilson (yellow card) 77'	Stadium: City Ground; Attendance: 27,470 (1,546 away); Referee: James Linington

29 October 2021 15	Queens Park Rangers	1–1	Nottingham Forest	White City, London
19:45 BST	Dozzell (yellow card) 43'; Dykes 45+5'; Johansen (yellow card) 83'	Report	Colback 90+1'; Worrall (yellow card) 90+2'	Stadium: Kiyan Prince Foundation Stadium; Attendance: 15,089 (2,885 away); Referee: Andy Davies
Note: Live on Sky Sports

2 November 2021 16	Nottingham Forest	1–1	Sheffield United	West Bridgford
19:45 GMT	Yates (yellow card) 51'; Figueiredo (yellow card) 53'; Johnson (yellow card) 69'; Grabban 83'; Worrall (yellow card) 90+1'	Report	Norwood (yellow card) 39'; Mousset (yellow card) 45+2'; Gibbs-White 78'	Stadium: City Ground; Attendance: 25,238 (1,972 away); Referee: Leigh Doughty

6 November 2021 17	Nottingham Forest	3–0	Preston North End	West Bridgford
15:00 GMT	Grabban 32' (pen.), 70' (yellow card) 50'; Colback 41'; Taylor (yellow card) 90+3'	Report	Hughes (yellow card) 26'; McCann (yellow card) 43'; Storey (yellow card) 52'	Stadium: City Ground; Attendance: 27,129 (1,917 away); Referee: Simon Hooper

20 November 2021 18	Reading	1–1	Nottingham Forest	Reading
15:00 GMT	Moore (yellow card) 32'; Drinkwater (yellow card) 57'; Dann 64'; Swift (yellow card) 66'; Rahman (yellow card) 87'	Report	Zinckernagel 4'; Yates (yellow card) 37'	Stadium: Select Car Leasing Stadium; Attendance: 14,907 (2,200 away); Referee: Andy Woolmer

23 November 2021 19	Nottingham Forest	0–0	Luton Town	West Bridgford
19:45 GMT	Taylor (yellow card) 26'; Colback (yellow card) 47' (yellow-red card) 61'; McKenna (yellow card) 55'	Report	Lockyer (yellow card) 45+1'; Ruddock (yellow card) 68'; Bradley (yellow card) 90+4'	Stadium: City Ground; Attendance: 25,715 (1,418 away); Referee: Jeremy Simpson

26 November 2021 20	West Bromwich Albion	0–0	Nottingham Forest	West Bromwich
20:00 GMT	Clarke (yellow card) 10'; Molumby (yellow card) 60' (yellow-red card) 70'	Report	Figueiredo (yellow card) 16'; Worrall (yellow card) 22'	Stadium: The Hawthorns; Attendance: 22,424 (2,000 away); Referee: Gavin Ward
Note: Live on Sky Sports

4 December 2021 21	Nottingham Forest	2–0	Peterborough United	West Bridgford
15:00 GMT	Garner 72'; Samba (yellow card) 82'; Yates 84'	Report	Clarke-Harris (yellow card) 57'; Butler (yellow card) 64'; Thompson (yellow card) 79'; Edwards (yellow card) 86'	Stadium: City Ground; Attendance: 28,308 (1,987 away); Referee: Thomas Bramall

11 December 2021 22	Swansea City	1–4	Nottingham Forest	Swansea
15:00 GMT	Downes (yellow card) 11'; Smith (yellow card) 31'; Cabango (yellow card) 55'; Piroe 62'	Report	Osei-Tutu (yellow card) 20'; Zinckernagel 48'; Grabban 50'; Spence (yellow card) 55'; McKenna (yellow card) 66'; Johnson 68'; Cafú 90+4' (yellow card) 90+5'	Stadium: Swansea.com Stadium; Attendance: 17,659 (1,730 away); Referee: Matt Donohue

18 December 2021 23	Nottingham Forest	2–1	Hull City	West Bridgford
15:00 GMT	Colback (yellow card) 29'; Grabban 55' (pen.); Johnson 72'; Worrall (yellow card) 72'	Report	McLoughlin (yellow card) 17'; Longman (yellow card) 36'; Lewis-Potter 43'; Smallwood (yellow card) 52'; Baxter (yellow card) 54'; Bernard (yellow card) 83'	Stadium: City Ground; Attendance: 26,513 (1,717 away); Referee: John Busby

26 December 2021 24	Middlesbrough	2–0	Nottingham Forest	Middlesbrough
15:00 GMT	Yates 17' (o.g.); Howson (yellow card) 26'; Šporar 69'	Report	Samba (yellow card) 32'; Carvalho (yellow card) 71'; Yates (yellow card) 90+3'	Stadium: Riverside Stadium; Attendance: 29,832 (2,141 away); Referee: David Webb

30 December 2021 25	Nottingham Forest	0–1	Huddersfield Town	West Bridgford
19:45 GMT	Worrall (yellow card) 28'	Report	Holmes (yellow card) 14', (goal) 30'; Nicholls (yellow card) 78'	Stadium: City Ground; Attendance: 27,159 (1,193 away); Referee: Gavin Ward

15 January 2022 26	Millwall	0–1	Nottingham Forest	New Cross, London
15:00 GMT	McNamara (yellow card) 57'	Report	Spence (yellow card) 45+2'; McKenna (yellow card) 85'; Grabban 90+1'	Stadium: The Den; Attendance: 13,297 (1,959 away); Referee: Peter Bankes

22 January 2022 27	Nottingham Forest	2–1	Derby County	West Bridgford
12:30 GMT	Grabban (yellow card) 35', (goal) 48'; Johnson 82'; Samba (yellow card) 89'	Report	Thompson (yellow card) 31'; Stearman (yellow card) 51'; Buchanan (yellow card) 56'; Lawrence 88' (pen.), (yellow card) 89'; Morrison (red card) 90+7'; Byrne (yellow card) 90+7'	Stadium: City Ground; Attendance: 29,256 (1,983 away); Referee: Tim Robinson
Note: Live on Sky Sports

25 January 2022 28	Nottingham Forest	3–0	Barnsley	West Bridgford
19:45 GMT	Davis 15', (yellow card) 61'; Yates 38'; Garner (yellow card) 52'; Johnson 75'	Report	Palmer (yellow card) 7'; Andersen (yellow card) 12'; Helik (yellow card) 61'	Stadium: City Ground; Attendance: 27,504 (642 away); Referee: Michael Salisbury

30 January 2022 29	Cardiff City	2–1	Nottingham Forest	Cardiff
16:00 GMT	Hugill 6'; Drameh (yellow card) 52'; Davies 65'; Wintle (yellow card) 83'	Report	Colback (yellow card) 27'; Davis 90+4'	Stadium: Cardiff City Stadium; Attendance: 18,866 (1,376 away); Referee: David Webb
Note: Live on Sky Sports

9 February 2022 30	Blackburn Rovers	0–2	Nottingham Forest	Blackburn
19:45 GMT	Buckley (yellow card) 18'; Lenihan (yellow card) 40' (yellow-red card) 53'; Brereton Díaz (yellow card) 59'	Report	Garner 22', (yellow card) 69'; Colback (yellow card) 31'; Surridge (yellow card) 87'; Johnson 90' (pen.)	Stadium: Ewood Park; Attendance: 13,869 (1,952 away); Referee: Joshua Smith
Note: Live on Sky Sports

12 February 2022 31	Nottingham Forest	2–2	Stoke City	West Bridgford
15:00 GMT	Lowe (yellow card) 7'; Davis (yellow card) 18'; Garner (yellow card) 52'; Johnson 56'; Samba (red card) 85'; Yates 90+2'	Report	Wilmot (yellow card) 33'; Maja 68'; Clucas (yellow card) 81'; Baker 88' (pen.); Allen (yellow card) 90+1'	Stadium: City Ground; Attendance: 28,990 (1,990 away); Referee: Leigh Doughty

22 February 2022 32	Preston North End	0–0	Nottingham Forest	Preston
19:45 GMT	Johnson (yellow card) 45+1'; Earl (yellow card) 77'; Whiteman (yellow card) 90+1'	Report	Colback (yellow card) 60'; McKenna (yellow card) 73'	Stadium: Deepdale; Attendance: 12,598 (2,308 away); Referee: Geoff Eltringham

26 February 2022 33	Nottingham Forest	2–0	Bristol City	West Bridgford
15:00 GMT	Johnson (yellow card) 32', (goal) 38'; Garner 55'	Report	Pring (yellow card) 9'; Scott (yellow card) 35'; Kalas (yellow card) 69'; Klose (yellow card) 90+4'	Stadium: City Ground; Attendance: 28,506 (1,464 away); Referee: Darren Bond

4 March 2022 34	Sheffield United	1–1	Nottingham Forest	Sheffield
19:45 GMT	Robinson (yellow card) 32'; Davies (yellow card) 51'; Sharp 69'; Norrington-Davies (yellow card) 87'; McBurnie (yellow card) 90+3'	Report	Johnson (penalty missed) 33'; Garner (yellow card) 43'; Yates 90+5'	Stadium: Bramall Lane; Attendance: 28,841 (2,725 away); Referee: Josh Smith

12 March 2022 35	Nottingham Forest	4–0	Reading	West Bridgford
15:00 GMT	Davis 1', 62', (yellow card) 63'; Colback (yellow card) 32'; Yates 75'; Surridge 80'	Report	Ince (yellow card) 9'; Yiadom (yellow card) 28'; Drinkwater (yellow card) 38'; Morrison (yellow card) 50'	Stadium: City Ground; Attendance: 28,128 (1,033 away); Referee: Thomas Bramall

16 March 2022 36	Nottingham Forest	3–1	Queens Park Rangers	West Bridgford
19:45 GMT	Spence 55'; Yates (yellow card) 62', (goal) 83'; Davis (yellow card) 77'; Johnson 87'	Report	Dozzell (yellow card) 36'; Gray 40'; Dunne (yellow card) 43'; Field (yellow card) 54'; Wallace (yellow card) 60'; Odubajo (yellow card) 80'	Stadium: City Ground; Attendance: 27,872 (1,031 away); Referee: Peter Bankes

2 April 2022 37	Blackpool	1–4	Nottingham Forest	Blackpool
12:30 GMT	Stewart (yellow card) 55'; Connolly 89'	Report	Zinckernagel 11'; Johnson 30', 36'; Surridge 82'; Lolley (yellow card) 88'	Stadium: Bloomfield Road; Attendance: 13,986 (3,133 away); Referee: Jarred Gillet

6 April 2022 38	Nottingham Forest	2–0	Coventry City	West Bridgford
19:45 BST	Worrall (yellow card) 21'; Johnson 25'; Zinckernagel (yellow card) 54'; Garner 61'; Colback (yellow card) 90+2'	Report	Bidwell (yellow card) 39'; Hyam (yellow card) 77'; O'Hare (yellow card) 90+7'	Stadium: City Ground; Attendance: 28,977 (1,974 away); Referee: Tim Robinson

9 April 2022 39	Nottingham Forest	2–0	Birmingham City	West Bridgford
15:00 BST	Davis 5'; Zinckernagel (yellow card) 54'; McKenna 79'	Report	Gordon (yellow card) 25'; Gardner (yellow card) 43'; Colin (yellow card) 59'	Stadium: City Ground; Attendance: 29,293 (1,998 away); Referee: Gavin Ward

15 April 2022 40	Luton Town	1–0	Nottingham Forest	Luton
12:30 BST	Bradley (yellow card) 26' (yellow-red card) 77'; Naismith 37' (pen.), (yellow card) 49'; Onyedinma (yellow card) 56'; Campbell (yellow card) 63'; Burke (yellow card) 63'; Shea (yellow card) 69'; Adebayo (yellow card) 90+3'	Report	Garner (yellow card) 44'; Davis (yellow card) 63'; Worrall (yellow card) 74'; Figueiredo (yellow card) 90+6'	Stadium: Kenilworth Road; Attendance: 10,070 (1,031 away); Referee: James Linington

18 April 2022 41	Nottingham Forest	4–0	West Bromwich Albion	West Bridgford
20:00 BST	Johnson 19' (pen.); Spence (yellow card) 21'; Yates 23' (yellow card) 60'; Colback 45+2'; Surridge 90+3'	Report	Furlong (yellow card) 14' (yellow-red card) 17'; Gardner-Hickman (yellow card) 39'; Phillips (yellow card) 86'	Stadium: City Ground; Attendance: 28,926 (1,740 away); Referee: David Webb

23 April 2022 42	Peterborough United	0–1	Nottingham Forest	Peterborough
15:00 BST	Burrows (yellow card) 19'; Taylor (yellow card) 25'; Szmodics (yellow card) 67'	Report	Surridge 45', (yellow card) 73'; Colback (yellow card) 88'; Samba (yellow card) 90'	Stadium: Weston Homes Stadium; Attendance: 12,870 (3,599 away); Referee: Michael Salisbury

26 April 2022 43	Fulham	0–1	Nottingham Forest	Fulham, London
19:45 BST	Reed (yellow card) 18'; Mitrović (yellow card) 90+3'	Report	Zinckernagel 15' (yellow card) 28'	Stadium: Craven Cottage; Attendance: 19,218 (1,728 away); Referee: Keith Stroud

30 April 2022 44	Nottingham Forest	5–1	Swansea City	West Bridgford
15:00 BST	Christie 22' (o.g.); Surridge 48', 52', 69'; Mighten 84'	Report	Christie (yellow card) 24'; Obafemi 28'; Latibeaudiere (yellow card) 38'	Stadium: City Ground; Attendance: 28,659 (1,403 away); Referee: Graham Scott

3 May 2022 45	Bournemouth	1–0	Nottingham Forest	Bournemouth
19:00 BST	Moore 83'; Travers (yellow card) 90+6'; Solanke (yellow card) 90+8'	Report	McKenna (yellow card) 82'; Spence (yellow card) 90+1'	Stadium: Vitality Stadium; Attendance: 10,563 (1,318 away); Referee: Stuart Attwell

7 May 2022 46	Hull City	1–1	Nottingham Forest	Kingston upon Hull
12:30 BST	Lewis-Potter 90+4'	Report	Figueiredo (yellow card) 63'; Johnson 90+2' (pen.) (yellow card) 90+3'	Stadium: MKM Stadium; Attendance: 18,399 (3,281 away); Referee: Simon Hooper

==== Play-offs ====
14 May 2022 Semi-final 1st Leg	Sheffield United	1–2	Nottingham Forest	Sheffield
15:00 BST	Fleck (yellow card) 29'; Robinson (yellow card) 44'; Norwood (yellow card) 53'; Berge 90+1'; Baldock (yellow card) 90+3'	Report	Colback 10'; Worrall (yellow card) 34'; Zinckernagel (yellow card) 43'; Spence (yellow card) 44'; Johnson 71'	Stadium: Bramall Lane; Attendance: 30,225; Referee: Andre Marriner

17 May 2022 Semi-final 2nd Leg	Nottingham Forest	1–2 (a.e.t.) (3–3 agg.) (3–2 p)	Sheffield United	West Bridgford
19:45 BST	Johnson 19'; McKenna (yellow card) 75'; Worrall (yellow card) 90+1'; Cook (yellow card) 111'	Report	Gibbs-White 47'; Robinson (yellow card) 58'; Fleck 75'	Stadium: City Ground; Attendance: 29,015; Referee: Michael Oliver
	Penalties
	Johnson (penalty scored); Cafú (penalty scored); Cook (penalty scored); Lolley (penalty missed)		(penalty missed) Norwood; (penalty missed) Hourihane; (penalty scored) Berge; (penalty scored) Ndiaye; (penalty missed) Gibbs-White

29 May 2022 Final	Huddersfield Town	0–1	Nottingham Forest	Wembley, London
16:30 BST	Toffolo (yellow card) 73'	Report	Colwill 43' (o.g.); Zinckernagel (yellow card) 55'	Stadium: Wembley Stadium; Attendance: 80,019; Referee: Jonathan Moss

=== FA Cup ===
Nottingham Forest were drawn at home to Arsenal in the third round.

9 January 2022 Third round	Nottingham Forest	1–0	Arsenal	West Bridgford
17:10 GMT	Zinckernagel (yellow card) 35'; Spence (yellow card) 78'; Grabban 83'	Report	Martinelli (yellow card) 74'	Stadium: City Ground; Attendance: 24,938; Referee: Craig Pawson
Note: Live on ITV

6 February 2022 Fourth round	Nottingham Forest	4–1	Leicester City	West Bridgford
16:00 GMT	Zinckernagel 23'; Johnson 24'; Worrall 32'; Spence 61'; Garner (yellow card) 65'	Report	Iheanacho 40'; Ndidi (yellow card) 59'; Maddison (yellow card) 74'	Stadium: City Ground; Attendance: 28,762; Referee: Paul Tierney
Note: Live on BBC One

7 March 2022 Fifth round	Nottingham Forest	2–1	Huddersfield Town	West Bridgford
19:30 GMT	Surridge 29'; Lowe (yellow card) 32'; Yates 37'	Report	Lees 13'	Stadium: City Ground; Attendance: 27,417; Referee: Graham Scott
Note: Live on ITV4

20 March 2022 Quarter-finals	Nottingham Forest	0–1	Liverpool	West Bridgford
18:00 GMT		Report	Gomez (yellow card) 60'; Jota 78'	Stadium: City Ground; Attendance: 28,584; Referee: Craig Pawson
Note: Live on ITV

=== EFL Cup ===
Forest were drawn at home to Bradford City in the first round and Wolverhampton Wanderers in the second round.

11 August 2021 First round	Nottingham Forest	2–1	Bradford City	West Bridgford
19:45 BST	Cafú (yellow card) 15'; Carvalho 39', 41'	Report	Cousin-Dawson (yellow card) 7'; Cooke 54'	Stadium: City Ground; Attendance: 9,514; Referee: Peter Wright

24 August 2021 Second round	Nottingham Forest	0–4	Wolverhampton Wanderers	West Bridgford
20:00 BST		Report	Saïss 58'; Podence 60'; Trincão 86'; Gibbs-White 88'	Stadium: City Ground; Attendance: 10,769; Referee: Andy Davies

== Transfers ==
=== In ===
==== Transfers in ====
Date	Position	Nationality	Player	From	Fee	Team	Ref.
5 July 2021	CM	(England)	Billy Fewster	(England) Leeds United	Free transfer	Under-23s	
5 July 2021	CF	(England)	Lewis Salmon	(England) Altrincham	Undisclosed	Under-23s	
13 July 2021	GK	(Scotland)	Nicky Hogarth	(Scotland) Rangers	Free transfer	Under-23s	
13 July 2021	GK	(United States)	Ethan Horvath	(Belgium) Club Brugge	Free transfer	First team	
13 August 2021	GK	(England)	Joe Watkins	(England) Charlton Athletic	Free transfer	Under-23s	
31 August 2021	DF	(Tunisia)	Mohamed Dräger	(Greece) Olympiacos	Undisclosed	First team	
31 August 2021	MF	(Paraguay)	Braian Ojeda	(Paraguay) Olimpia	Undisclosed	First team	
31 August 2021	FW	(Portugal)	Xande Silva	(England) West Ham United	Undisclosed	First team	
2 September 2021	DF	(Brazil)	Rodrigo Ely	(Spain) Alavés	Free transfer	First team	
4 January 2022	DF	(England)	Steve Cook	(England) Bournemouth	Free transfer	First team	
8 January 2022	DF	(Canada)	Richie Laryea	(Canada) Toronto FC	Undisclosed	First team	
31 January 2022	FW	(England)	Sam Surridge	(England) Stoke City	Undisclosed	First team	
31 January 2022	DF	(England)	Jonathan Panzo	(France) Dijon	Undisclosed	First team	
9 March 2022	MF	(England)	Ethan Hull	(England) Manchester United	Undisclosed	Under-18s	
9 March 2022	MF	(Northern Ireland)	Bobby Jack McAleese	(Northern Ireland) Coleraine	Undisclosed	Under-18s	

==== Loans in ====
Date from	Position	Nationality	Player	From	Duration	Team	Ref.
7 August 2021	RW	(Denmark)	Philip Zinckernagel	(England) Watford	End of season	First team	
10 August 2021	DF	(England)	Jordi Osei-Tutu	(England) Arsenal	6 January 2022	First team	
22 August 2021	MF	(England)	James Garner	(England) Manchester United	End of season	First team	
27 August 2021	DF	(England)	Max Lowe	(England) Sheffield United	End of season	First team	
1 September 2021	DF	(England)	Djed Spence	(England) Middlesbrough	End of season	First team	
1 January 2022	FW	(England)	Keinan Davis	(England) Aston Villa	End of season	First team	

=== Out ===
==== Transfers out ====
Date	Position	Nationality	Player	To	Fee	Team	Ref.
1 July 2021	LW	(England)	Sammy Ameobi	(England) Middlesbrough	Released	First team	
1 July 2021	FW	(England)	Elliott Andrew		Released	Under-23s	
1 July 2021	FW	(Ghana)	Keith Asare	Retired		Under-23s	
1 July 2021	CB	(England)	Michael Dawson	Retired		First team	
1 July 2021	MF	(England)	Ethan Dekel-Daks	(United States) South Carolina Gamecocks	Released	Under-23s	
1 July 2021	GK	(Senegal)	Abdoulaye Diallo	(France) Nancy	Released	First team	
1 July 2021	MF	(Republic of Ireland)	Yassine En-Neyah	(Republic of Ireland) Shelbourne	Released	Under-23s	
1 July 2021	MF	(United States)	Adrian Galliani	(Greece) Olympiacos	Released	Under-23s	
1 July 2021	FW	(France)	Virgil Gomis	(France) Paris FC	Released	Under-23s	
1 July 2021	CB	(Germany)	Michael Hefele	Retired		First team	
1 July 2021	CF	(England)	Glenn Murray	Retired		First team	
1 July 2021	MF	(Greece)	Grigoris Pietris		Released	Under-23s	
1 July 2021	MF	(Greece)	Fotis Pikoulas		Released	Under-23s	
1 July 2021	DF	(England)	Danny Preston	(England) Alfreton Town	Released	Under-23s	
1 July 2021	LB	(Portugal)	Yuri Ribeiro	(Poland) Legia Warsaw	Released	First team	
1 July 2021	DM	(Mali)	Samba Sow	(France) Lens	Released	First team	
1 July 2021	DF	(England)	Malique Spooner	(United States) FIU Panthers	Released	Under-23s	
1 July 2021	GK	(England)	Michael Statham	(England) Longridge Town	Released	Under-23s	
6 August 2021	DF	(England)	Tyler Blackett	(United States) FC Cincinnati	Free transfer	First team	
16 August 2021	MF	(Comoros)	Fouad Bachirou	(Cyprus) Omonia	Free transfer	First team	
31 August 2021	DF	(England)	Jordan Gabriel	(England) Blackpool	Undisclosed	First team	
21 January 2022	GK	(England)	Jordan Wright	(England) Lincoln City	Undisclosed	Under-23s	
29 January 2022	MF	(Portugal)	João Carvalho	(Greece) Olympiacos	Undisclosed	First team	
31 January 2022	DF	(Brazil)	Rodrigo Ely	(Spain) Almería	Contract terminated	First team	

==== Loans out ====
Date from	Position	Nationality	Player	To	Duration	Team	Ref.
25 June 2021	GK	(England)	George Shelvey	(England) Mansfield Town	6 January 2022	Under-23s	
5 July 2021	DF	(Cyprus)	Nicholas Ioannou	(Italy) Como	End of season	First team	
16 August 2021	MF	(England)	Josh Barnes	(England) Truro City	One month	Under-23s	
31 August 2021	MF	(Republic of Ireland)	Harry Arter	(England) Charlton Athletic	4 January 2022	First team	
31 August 2021	FW	(Cape Verde)	Nuno da Costa	(France) Caen	End of season	First team	
14 September 2021	DF	(Albania)	Rezart Rama	(England) Truro City	One month	Under-23s	
9 October 2021	GK	(England)	Jordan Wright	(England) Hereford	One month	Under-23s	
7 December 2021	DF	(England)	Jayden Richardson	(England) Notts County	End of season	Under-23s	
18 January 2022	MF	(Sierra Leone)	Tyrese Fornah	(England) Shrewsbury Town	End of season	First team	
19 January 2022	DF	(England)	Carl Jenkinson	(Australia) Melbourne City	End of season	First team	
27 January 2022	FW	(Montserrat)	Lyle Taylor	(England) Birmingham City	End of season	First team	
2 February 2022	DF	(Tunisia)	Mohamed Dräger	(Switzerland) Luzern	End of season	First team	
16 February 2022	MF	(Wales)	Morgan Thomas-Sadler	(England) Ilkeston Town	End of season	Under-23s	
22 February 2022	DF	(England)	Sam Sanders	(England) York City	End of season	Under-23s	
16 March 2022	MF	(Republic of Ireland)	Harry Arter	(England) Notts County	End of season	First team	
24 March 2022	FW	(England)	Lewis Salmon	(England) Alfreton Town	End of season	Under-23s	

=== New contracts ===
Date	Position	Nationality	Player	Old contract end	New contract end	Ref.
5 July 2021	MF	(England)	Josh Barnes	2021	2022	
5 July 2021	DF	(England)	Riley Harbottle	2021	2022	
5 July 2021	DF	(England)	Sam Sanders	2021	2022	
5 July 2021	GK	(England)	Jordan Wright	2021		
13 July 2021	DF	(England)	Fin Back			
10 August 2021	DF	(Northern Ireland)	Aaron Donnelly		2022	
15 December 2021	MF	(England)	Tyrese Fornah	2022	2024	
6 January 2022	FW	(England)	Detlef Esapa Osong			
14 March 2022	MF	(England)	Ryan Yates	2023	2025	
14 March 2022	GK	(England)	Jordan Smith	2022	2023	
21 April 2022	FW	(Sweden)	Julian Larsson		2025	

== Statistics ==
=== Goals and appearances ===
As of match played 29 May 2022 (Note: Players whose names are in italics were sent out on loan to other clubs this season.)

No.	Pos	Nat	Player	Total		Championship		FA Cup		EFL Cup		Championship Play-Offs	
No.	Pos	Nat	Player	Apps	Goals	Apps	Goals	Apps	Goals	Apps	Goals	Apps	Goals
1	GK	(United States) USA	Ethan Horvath	11	0	6	0	2	0	2	0	0+1	0
2	DF	(England) ENG	Djed Spence	46	3	38+1	2	4	1	0	0	3	0
3	DF	(Portugal) POR	Tobias Figueiredo	28	0	22+4	0	1	0	0+1	0	0	0
4	DF	(England) ENG	Joe Worrall	46	1	39	0	4	1	0	0	3	0
5	DF	(Brazil) BRA	Rodrigo Ely	0	0	0	0	0	0	0	0	0	0
6	DF	(France) FRA	Loïc Mbe Soh	2	0	2	0	0	0	0	0	0	0
7	FW	(England) ENG	Lewis Grabban	34	13	23+9	12	0+1	1	1	0	0	0
8	MF	(England) ENG	Jack Colback	46	4	36+2	3	2+2	0	1	0	3	1
9	FW	(England) ENG	Keinan Davis	22	5	14+1	5	3+1	0	0	0	1+2	0
10	MF	(Portugal) POR	João Carvalho	8	2	2+5	0	0	0	1	2	0	0
11	FW	(Denmark) DEN	Philip Zinckernagel	50	7	35+7	6	4	1	1	0	3	0
12	GK	(England) ENG	Jordan Smith	0	0	0	0	0	0	0	0	0	0
13	DF	(Cameroon) CMR	Gaëtan Bong	7	0	4+3	0	0	0	0	0	0	0
14	DF	(Canada) CAN	Richie Laryea	5	0	1+4	0	0	0	0	0	0	0
15	DF	(England) ENG	Max Lowe	23	1	19+1	1	2	0	0	0	0+1	0
16	DF	(England) ENG	Carl Jenkinson	0	0	0	0	0	0	0	0	0	0
16	FW	(England) ENG	Sam Surridge	23	8	5+12	7	1+2	1	0	0	2+1	0
17	FW	(England) ENG	Alex Mighten	27	1	5+18	1	0+1	0	1+1	0	0+1	0
18	MF	(Portugal) POR	Cafú	20	1	2+12	1	0+3	0	1+1	0	0+1	0
19	FW	(Portugal) POR	Xande Silva	10	0	2+6	0	0+2	0	0	0	0	0
20	FW	(Wales) WAL	Brennan Johnson	53	19	44+2	16	4	1	0	0	3	2
21	MF	(Paraguay) PAR	Braian Ojeda	3	0	3	0	0	0	0	0	0	0
22	MF	(England) ENG	Ryan Yates	51	9	41+2	8	4	1	0+1	0	3	0
23	MF	(England) ENG	Joe Lolley	30	0	10+17	0	1	0	0	0	0+2	0
24	DF	(England) ENG	Jordi Osei-Tutu	4	0	4	0	0	0	0	0	0	0
24	DF	(England) ENG	Jonathan Panzo	1	0	1	0	0	0	0	0	0	0
25	DF	(Tunisia) TUN	Mohamed Dräger	0	0	0	0	0	0	0	0	0	0
26	DF	(Scotland) SCO	Scott McKenna	51	2	45	2	3	0	0	0	3	0
27	DF	(England) ENG	Steve Cook	20	0	13+1	0	3	0	0	0	3	0
27	DF	(England) ENG	Jordan Gabriel	4	0	4	0	0	0	0	0	0	0
29	FW	(Cape Verde) CPV	Nuno da Costa	1	0	0	0	0	0	0+1	0	0	0
30	GK	(Republic of the Congo) CGO	Brice Samba	45	0	40	0	2	0	0	0	3	0
33	FW	(Montserrat) MSR	Lyle Taylor	19	3	8+10	3	0	0	0+1	0	0	0
37	MF	(England) ENG	James Garner	49	4	36+5	4	4	0	1	0	3	0
38	MF	(England) ENG	Tyrese Fornah	3	0	0+1	0	0	0	2	0	0	0
41	MF	(Wales) WAL	Oliver Hammond	1	0	0	0	0	0	1	0	0	0
42	MF	(France) FRA	Ateef Konaté	3	0	0+1	0	0	0	2	0	0	0
43	DF	(Portugal) POR	Baba Fernandes	2	0	0	0	0	0	2	0	0	0
44	DF	(England) ENG	Fin Back	5	0	2+1	0	0	0	2	0	0	0
45	DF	(England) ENG	Jayden Richardson	4	0	0+2	0	0	0	2	0	0	0
46	DF	(England) ENG	Riley Harbottle	2	0	0	0	0	0	2	0	0	0
	MF	(Republic of Ireland) IRL	Harry Arter	0	0	0	0	0	0	0	0	0	0
	DF	(Cyprus) CYP	Nicholas Ioannou	0	0	0	0	0	0	0	0	0	0

== Awards ==
=== Club ===
==== UK Meds Player of the Season ====
Result	Player	Ref
Won	(Scotland) Scott McKenna	

==== BOXT Goal of the Season ====
Result	Player	Ref
Won	(England) Jack Colback (vs. West Bromwich Albion on 18 April)	

=== League ===
==== Sky Bet Championship Young Player of the Season ====
Result	Player	Ref
Won	(Wales) Brennan Johnson	

==== Sky Bet Championship Team of the Season ====
Result	Player	Ref
Won	(England) Djed Spence	
Won	(England) Joe Worrall	
Won	(England) Ryan Yates	

==== Sky Bet Championship Manager of the Month ====
Result	Month	Manager	Ref
Won	April	(Wales) Steve Cooper	

==== Sky Bet Championship Player of the Month ====
Result	Month	Player	Ref
Won	March	(England) Djed Spence	
Won	April	(Wales) Brennan Johnson	

==== Sky Bet Championship Goal of the Month ====
Result	Month	Player	Ref
Won	March	(England) Djed Spence	

==== EFL's Young Player of the Month ====
Result	Month	Player	Ref
Won	September	(Wales) Brennan Johnson	
Won	March	(England) Djed Spence	

==== PFA Vertu Motors Fans' Player of the Month ====
Result	Month	Player	Ref
Nominated	February	(Wales) Brennan Johnson	

=== Cup ===
==== Emirates FA Cup Player of the Round ====
Result	Round	Player	Ref
Won	Fourth round	(Wales) Brennan Johnson	
