= 2020–21 Nottingham Forest F.C. season =

English football club season

Nottingham Forest
2020–21 season
- Owner: Evangelos Marinakis; Sokratis Kominakis
- Chairman: Nicholas Randall QC
- Manager: Sabri Lamouchi (until 6 October); Chris Hughton (from 6 October)
- Stadium: City Ground
- Championship: 17th
- FA Cup: Fourth round
- EFL Cup: First round
- Top goalscorer: League: Lewis Grabban (6); All: Lewis Grabban (6)
Home colours	Away colours

The 2020–21 Nottingham Forest Football Club season was the club's 155th year since their formation and the club's 13th consecutive season in the EFL Championship, the second tier of English football. In addition to the EFL Championship, they played in two domestic cup competitions; they were eliminated in the fourth round of the FA Cup and the first round of the EFL Cup.

== Players ==
As of 1 February 2021

No.	Player	Nationality	Date of birth (age)	Previous club	Joined first team	Contract ends
Goalkeepers
12	Jordan Smith	(England)	8 December 1994 (aged 26)	Academy	2016	2022
30	Brice Samba	(Republic of the Congo)	25 April 1994 (aged 27)	(France) Caen	2019	2023
39	Abdoulaye Diallo	(Senegal)	30 March 1992 (aged 29)	(Turkey) Gençlerbirliği	2020	2021
Defenders
2	Cyrus Christie	(Republic of Ireland)	30 September 1992 (aged 28)	(England) Fulham	2020	2021
3	Tobias Figueiredo	(Portugal)	2 February 1994 (aged 27)	(Portugal) Sporting CP	2018	2022
4	Joe Worrall	(England)	10 January 1997 (aged 24)	Academy	2016	2024
5	Yuri Ribeiro	(Portugal)	24 January 1997 (aged 24)	(Portugal) Benfica	2019	2021
6	Loïc Mbe Soh	(France)	13 June 2001 (aged 20)	(France) Paris Saint-Germain	2020	2024
13	Gaëtan Bong	(Cameroon)	25 April 1988 (aged 33)	(England) Brighton & Hove Albion	2020	2022
16	Carl Jenkinson	(England)	8 February 1992 (aged 29)	(England) Arsenal	2019	2022
20	Michael Dawson	(England)	18 November 1983 (aged 37)	(England) Hull City	2018	2021
24	Tyler Blackett	(England)	2 April 1994 (aged 27)	(England) Reading	2020	2022
26	Scott McKenna	(Scotland)	12 November 1996 (aged 24)	(Scotland) Aberdeen	2020	2024
Midfielders
8	Jack Colback	(England)	24 October 1989 (aged 31)	(England) Newcastle United	2020	2023
11	Sammy Ameobi	(England)	1 May 1992 (aged 29)	(England) Bolton Wanderers	2019	2021
14	Fouad Bachirou	(Comoros)	15 April 1990 (aged 31)	(Sweden) Malmö FF	2020	2022
15	Luke Freeman	(England)	22 March 1992 (aged 29)	(England) Sheffield United	2020	2021
18	Cafú	(Portugal)	26 February 1993 (aged 28)	(Greece) Olympiacos	2020	2023
21	Samba Sow	(Mali)	29 April 1989 (aged 32)	(Russia) Dynamo Moscow	2019	2021
22	Ryan Yates	(England)	21 November 1997 (aged 23)	Academy	2016	2023
27	Filip Krovinović	(Croatia)	29 August 1995 (aged 25)	(Portugal) Benfica	2021	2021
28	Anthony Knockaert	(France)	20 November 1991 (aged 29)	(England) Fulham	2020	2021
31	Harry Arter	(Republic of Ireland)	28 December 1989 (aged 31)	(England) Bournemouth	2020	2023
37	James Garner	(England)	13 March 2001 (aged 20)	(England) Manchester United	2021	2021
Forwards
7	Lewis Grabban	(England)	12 January 1988 (aged 33)	(England) Bournemouth	2018	2022
17	Alex Mighten	(England)	11 April 2002 (aged 19)	Academy	2020	2025
23	Joe Lolley	(England)	25 August 1992 (aged 28)	(England) Huddersfield Town	2018	2023
25	Glenn Murray	(England)	25 September 1983 (aged 37)	(England) Brighton & Hove Albion	2021	2021
33	Lyle Taylor	(Montserrat)	29 March 1990 (aged 31)	(England) Charlton Athletic	2020	2023

=== New contracts ===
Date	Position	Nationality	Player	Old contract end	New contract end	Ref.
24 August 2020	FW	(England)	Alex Mighten	2022	2025	
2 September 2020	GK	(England)	Jordan Smith	2020	2022	
1 October 2020	DF	(England)	Jordan Gabriel	2022	2024	
8 December 2020	FW	(England)	Will Swan		2024	
15 December 2020	FW	(Northern Ireland)	Dale Taylor			
27 February 2021	FW	(England)	Alex Gibson-Hammond			
28 February 2021	MF	(Northern Ireland)	Jamie McDonnell			
12 March 2021	GK	(England)	George Shelvey			
30 March 2021	MF	(England)	Oli Hammond			
24 May 2021	DF	(England)	James Clarridge			

== Transfers ==
=== In ===
Date	Position	Nationality	Name	From	Fee	Team	Ref.
22 July 2020	MF	(Northern Ireland)	Jamie McDonnell	(Northern Ireland) Glentoran	Undisclosed	Under-18s	
3 August 2020	FW	(Northern Ireland)	Dale Taylor	(Northern Ireland) Linfield	Undisclosed	Under-18s	
11 August 2020	MF	(England)	Jack Colback	(England) Newcastle United	Free	First team	
14 August 2020	MF	(Greece)	Alexandros Sarantis	(Greece) AEK Athens	Undisclosed	Under-18s	
15 August 2020	DF	(England)	Tyler Blackett	(England) Reading	Free	First team	
15 August 2020	FW	(Montserrat)	Lyle Taylor	(England) Charlton Athletic	Free	First team	
26 August 2020	MF	(Comoros)	Fouad Bachirou	(Sweden) Malmö FF	Undisclosed	First team	
4 September 2020	FW	(Spain)	Miguel Ángel Guerrero	(Greece) Olympiacos	Undisclosed	First team	
11 September 2020	DF	(France)	Loïc Mbe Soh	(France) Paris Saint-Germain	Undisclosed	First team	
14 September 2020	GK	(Senegal)	Abdoulaye Diallo	(Turkey) Gençlerbirliği	Free	First team	
15 September 2020	MF	(France)	Ateef Konaté	(France) Le Havre	Undisclosed	Under-23s	
22 September 2020	MF	(Republic of Ireland)	Harry Arter	(England) Bournemouth	Undisclosed	First team	
23 September 2020	DF	(Scotland)	Scott McKenna	(Scotland) Aberdeen	Undisclosed	First team	
25 September 2020	DF	(Cyprus)	Nicholas Ioannou	(Cyprus) APOEL	Undisclosed	First team	
1 November 2020	DF	(Portugal)	Baba Fernandes	(Portugal) Vitória de Setúbal	Free	Under-23s	
7 January 2021	MF	(Guatemala)	Marcelo Saraiva	(Brazil) Internacional	Free	Under-23s	
1 February 2021	FW	(England)	Glenn Murray	(England) Brighton & Hove Albion	Free	First team	
2 February 2021	MF	(Portugal)	Cafú	(Greece) Olympiacos	Undisclosed	First team	

=== Out ===
Date	Position	Nationality	Name	To	Fee	Team	Ref.
20 June 2020	DF	(England)	Max Ram	(England) Stratford Town	Released	Under-18s	
23 June 2020	MF	(Scotland)	Liam Bridcutt	(England) Lincoln City	Released	First team	
23 June 2020	MF	(England)	Toby Edser	(England) Aldershot Town	Released	Under-23s	
23 June 2020	DF	(Scotland)	Owen Gallacher	(England) Burton Albion	Released	Under-23s	
23 June 2020	FW	(Philippines)	Kieran Hayes	(England) Truro City	Released	Under-23s	
23 June 2020	FW	(England)	Victor Sodeinde	(England) Hereford	Released	Under-23s	
23 June 2020	GK	(England)	Luke Steele	(England) Stamford	Released	First team	
23 June 2020	DF	(England)	Ethan Stewart	(England) Nuneaton Borough	Released	Under-23s	
23 June 2020	MF	(England)	Louis Walsh	(England) Southend United	Released	Under-23s	
23 June 2020	MF	(England)	Ben Watson	(England) Charlton Athletic	Released	First team	
28 August 2020	FW	(England)	Tyler Walker	(England) Coventry City	Undisclosed	First team	
3 September 2020	DF	(Poland)	Matty Cash	(England) Aston Villa	£14,000,000 (Note: Fee could rise to £16,000,000 if all clauses and performance-related bonuses are met.)	First team	
4 September 2020	GK	(Romania)	Costel Pantilimon	(Turkey) Denizlispor	Mutual consent	First team	
2 October 2020	MF	(Ghana)	Albert Adomah	(England) Queens Park Rangers	Mutual consent	First team	
3 October 2020	MF	(Portugal)	Tiago Silva	(Greece) Olympiacos	Undisclosed	First team	
5 October 2020	DF	(Tunisia)	Yohan Benalouane	(Greece) Aris	Mutual consent	First team	
11 January 2021	MF	(England)	Jake Taylor	(England) Port Vale	Undisclosed	Under-23s	
11 January 2021	DF	(Zimbabwe)	Tendayi Darikwa	(England) Wigan Athletic	Undisclosed	First team	
22 January 2021	FW	(England)	Zach Clough	(England) Wigan Athletic	Free	First team	
1 February 2021	FW	(Spain)	Miguel Ángel Guerrero	(Spain) Rayo Vallecano	Undisclosed	First team	
6 May 2021	MF	(England)	Marcus McGuane	(England) Oxford United	Undisclosed	Under-23s	

=== Loans in ===
Date	Position	Nationality	Name	From	Loan ends	Team	Ref.
28 August 2020	MF	(England)	Luke Freeman	(England) Sheffield United	End of season	First team	
18 September 2020	DF	(Republic of Ireland)	Cyrus Christie	(England) Fulham	End of season	First team	
5 October 2020	MF	(Portugal)	Cafú	(Greece) Olympiacos	2 February 2021	First team	
16 October 2020	MF	(France)	Anthony Knockaert	(England) Fulham	End of season	First team	
22 January 2021	MF	(Croatia)	Filip Krovinović	(Portugal) Benfica	End of season	First team	
30 January 2021	MF	(England)	James Garner	(England) Manchester United	End of season	First team	

=== Loans out ===
Date	Position	Nationality	Name	To	Loan ends	Team	Ref.
15 August 2020	MF	(England)	Marcus McGuane	(England) Oxford United	6 May 2021	Under-23s	
3 September 2020	DF	(England)	Danny Preston	(England) Grimsby Town	2 February 2021	Under-23s	
23 September 2020	DF	(England)	Jayden Richardson	(England) Forest Green Rovers	End of season	Under-23s	
25 September 2020	MF	(Wales)	Brennan Johnson	(England) Lincoln City	End of season	First team	
29 September 2020	MF	(Portugal)	João Carvalho	(Spain) Almería	End of season	First team	
1 October 2020	DF	(England)	Jordan Gabriel	(England) Blackpool	End of season	First team	
1 October 2020	MF	(England)	Jake Taylor	(England) Scunthorpe United	5 January 2021	Under-23s	
2 October 2020	MF	(England)	Tyrese Fornah	(England) Plymouth Argyle	End of season	Under-23s	
5 October 2020	FW	(Cape Verde)	Nuno da Costa	(Belgium) Royal Excel Mouscron	End of season	First team	
16 October 2020	FW	(France)	Virgil Gomis	(England) Grimsby Town	5 January 2021	Under-23s	
8 January 2021	DF	(Cyprus)	Nicholas Ioannou	(Greece) Aris	End of season	First team	
16 January 2021	GK	(England)	Jordan Wright	(Scotland) Alloa Athletic	End of season	Under-23s	
1 February 2021	FW	(England)	Will Swan	(England) Port Vale	End of season	First team	
19 March 2021	DF	(England)	Riley Harbottle	(England) Wealdstone	April 2021	Under-23s	
10 April 2021	GK	(England)	George Shelvey	(England) Wealdstone	End of season	Under-23s	

== Competitions ==
=== Overview ===
Competition	First match	Last match	Starting round	Final position	Record							
Competition	First match	Last match	Starting round	Final position	Pld	W	D	L	GF	GA	GD	Win %
EFL Championship	12 September 2020	8 May 2021	Matchday 1	17th	46	12	16	18	37	45	−8	26.09
FA Cup	9 January 2021	23 January 2021	Third round	Fourth round	2	1	0	1	2	5	−3	50.00
EFL Cup	5 September 2020	5 September 2020	First round	First round	1	0	0	1	0	1	−1	0.00
Total					49	13	16	20	39	51	−12	26.53

Last updated: 8 May 2021
Source: Competitions

=== EFL Championship ===
==== League table ====
Pos	Team	Pld	W	D	L	GF	GA	GD	Pts
14	Stoke City	46	15	15	16	50	52	−2	60
15	Blackburn Rovers	46	15	12	19	65	54	+11	57
16	Coventry City	46	14	13	19	49	61	−12	55
17	Nottingham Forest	46	12	16	18	37	45	−8	52
18	Birmingham City	46	13	13	20	37	61	−24	52
19	Bristol City	46	15	6	25	46	68	−22	51
20	Huddersfield Town	46	12	13	21	50	71	−21	49

Source: EFL Official Website
Rules for classification: 1) Points; 2) Goal difference; 3) Number of goals scored; 4) Head-to-head results; 5) Wins; 6) Away goals; 7) Penalty points (sec 9.5); 8) 12-point sending off offences

==== Results summary ====
Overall								Home						Away					
Pld	W	D	L	GF	GA	GD	Pts	W	D	L	GF	GA	GD	W	D	L	GF	GA	GD
46	12	16	18	37	45	−8	52	6	8	9	21	24	−3	6	8	9	16	21	−5

Last updated: 8 May 2021.

==== Results by matchday ====
Matchday	1	2	3	4	5	6	7	8	9	10	11	12	13	14	15	16	17	18	19	20	21	22	23	24	25	26	27	28	29	30	31	32	33	34	35	36	37	38	39	40	41	42	43	44	45	46
Ground	A	H	A	H	A	H	H	A	A	H	H	A	A	H	H	A	A	H	H	A	H	A	A	H	H	H	A	A	H	A	H	A	A	H	A	H	H	A	A	H	A	H	A	H	A	H
Result	L	L	L	L	W	D	D	D	L	W	W	L	L	L	D	L	L	L	W	D	D	D	W	W	L	D	W	W	D	L	W	W	D	L	L	D	L	D	W	W	D	L	D	D	D	L
Position	23	22	21	22	20	20	19	20	21	20	20	20	20	21	21	21	21	21	21	20	20	21	19	19	20	21	19	18	16	18	17	15	16	16	17	17	18	17	16	15	15	16	18	17	16	17

Updated to match(es) played on 8 May 2021. Source:
A = Away; H = Home; W = Win; D = Draw; L = Loss

==== Matches ====
The 2020–21 season fixtures were released on 21 August.

12 September 2020 1	Queens Park Rangers	2–0	Nottingham Forest	London
15:00 BST	Dykes 54' (pen.) (yellow card) 77'; Chair 90+4'	Report	Figueiredo (yellow card) 53'; Lawrence-Gabriel (yellow card) 62'	Stadium: Kiyan Prince Foundation Stadium; Attendance: 0 Referee: Tom Robinson

19 September 2020 2	Nottingham Forest	0–2	Cardiff City	West Bridgford
12:30 BST		Report	Moore 3', 40'	Stadium: City Ground; Attendance: 0 Referee: James Linington

25 September 2020 3	Huddersfield Town	1–0	Nottingham Forest	Huddersfield
19:45 BST	Hogg (yellow card) 11'; Campbell 54'; Stearman (yellow card) 72'	Report	Sow (yellow card) 19'; Colback (yellow card) 29'; Ameobi (yellow card) 60'; McKenna (yellow card) 81'	Stadium: John Smith's Stadium; Attendance: 0 Referee: Oliver Langford

3 October 2020 4	Nottingham Forest	1–2	Bristol City	West Bridgford
15:00 BST	Freeman 35'	Report	Weimann 12'; Wells 22'; Hunt (yellow card) 39'; Mawson (yellow card) 43'	Stadium: City Ground; Attendance: 0 Referee: Keith Stroud

17 October 2020 5	Blackburn Rovers	0–1	Nottingham Forest	Blackburn
15:00 BST	Johnson (yellow card) 58' Gallagher (yellow card) 72'	Report	Lolley 90'	Stadium: Ewood Park; Attendance: 0 Referee: Jarred Gillet

20 October 2020 6	Nottingham Forest	1–1	Rotherham United	West Bridgford
19:45 BST	Ameobi 79'	Report	Barlaser 51' (pen.); Lindsay (yellow card) 54'; Harding (yellow card) 90+1'	Stadium: City Ground; Attendance: 0 Referee: Steve Martin

23 October 2020 7	Nottingham Forest	1–1	Derby County	West Bridgford
19:45 BST	Christie (yellow card) 18'; Taylor 64'; Arter (yellow card) 90+3'	Report	Waghorn 30'	Stadium: City Ground; Attendance: 0 Referee: Tony Harrington

28 October 2020 8	Luton Town	1–1	Nottingham Forest	Luton
19:45 GMT	Rea 22' (yellow card) 73'; Ruddock (yellow card) 55'; Cranie (yellow card) 71'	Report	Ioannou (red card) 44'; Rea 64' (o.g.)	Stadium: Kenilworth Road; Attendance: 0 Referee: Tim Robinson

31 October 2020 9	Middlesbrough	1–0	Nottingham Forest	Middlesbrough
15:00 GMT	Morsy (yellow card) 17'; Johnson 81'	Report	Figueiredo (yellow card) 54'; Bong (yellow card) 87'	Stadium: Riverside Stadium; Attendance: 0 Referee: Lee Mason

4 November 2020 10	Nottingham Forest	2–1	Coventry City	West Bridgford
19:45 GMT	Sow (yellow card) 18'; McKenna 30'; Taylor 90+7' (pen.)	Report	O'Hare 57'; Østigård (yellow card) 85'; McFadzean (yellow card) 90+6'	Stadium: City Ground; Attendance: 0 Referee: Geoff Eltringham

7 November 2020 11	Nottingham Forest	2–0	Wycombe Wanderers	West Bridgford
15:00 GMT	Guerrero (yellow card) 12'; Taylor 28', 74'	Report	Thompson (yellow card) 67'; Grimmer (yellow card) 90+3'	Stadium: City Ground; Attendance: 0 Referee: Matt Donohue

21 November 2020 12	Barnsley	2–0	Nottingham Forest	Barnsley
15:00 GMT	Styles 86'; Woodrow 88'	Report	Samba (yellow card) 86'	Stadium: Oakwell; Attendance: 0 Referee: Andy Woolmer

24 November 2020 13	Bournemouth	2–0	Nottingham Forest	Bournemouth
20:00 GMT	Stanislas 3', 51' (pen.); Gosling (yellow card) 80'; Cook (yellow card) 86'	Report		Stadium: Vitality Stadium; Attendance: 0 Referee: Simon Hooper

29 November 2020 14	Nottingham Forest	0–1	Swansea City	West Bridgford
12:00 GMT	Arter (yellow card) 51'; Figueiredo (yellow card) 74'; McKenna (yellow card) 78'; Taylor (yellow card) 90+2'	Report	Roberts 43'; Woodman (yellow card) 87'; Bidwell (yellow card) 89'	Stadium: The City Ground; Attendance: 0 Referee: Tony Harrington

2 December 2020 15	Nottingham Forest	0–0	Watford	West Bridgford
19:45 GMT	Lolley (yellow card) 23'; Knockaert (yellow card) 54'; Arter (yellow card) 84'	Report	Chalobah (yellow card) 69'; Quina (yellow card) 71'	Stadium: The City Ground; Attendance: 0 Referee: David Webb

5 December 2020 16	Reading	2–0	Nottingham Forest	Reading
12:30 GMT (UTC)	João 16' (pen.); Morrison 53'; Richards (yellow card) 83'	Report	Yates (red card) 14'; Cafú (yellow card) 90+1'	Stadium: Madejski Stadium; Attendance: 2,000; Referee: Gavin Ward

9 December 2020 17	Norwich City	2–1	Nottingham Forest	Norwich
19:45 GMT	Sørensen 45+3'; Skipp (yellow card) 53'; Buendía (yellow card) 59' (goal) 77'; Aarons (yellow card) 74'; Cantwell (yellow card) 87'	Report	Sow (yellow card) 27'; Knockaert 73'	Stadium: Carrow Road; Referee: Darren Bond

12 December 2020 18	Nottingham Forest	1–3	Brentford	West Bridgford
15:00 GMT	Figueiredo (yellow card) 61'; Samba (yellow card) 64'; Knockaert (yellow card) 79' (yellow-red card) 90+5'; Worrall 90+2'	Report	Dalsgaard 15'; Toney (yellow card) 64' (goal) 88'; Raya (yellow card) 81'; Dasilva 83'; Janelt (yellow card) 90+2'	Stadium: The City Ground; Attendance: 0 Referee: Geoff Eltringham

15 December 2020 19	Nottingham Forest	2–0	Sheffield Wednesday	West Bridgford
19:45 BST	Ribeiro 4'; Grabban 87'	Report		Stadium: City Ground; Attendance: 0 Referee: Steve Martin

19 December 2020 20	Millwall	1–1	Nottingham Forest	London
15:00 GMT	Leonard (yellow card) 14'; Romeo (yellow card) 16'; Bradshaw 47'	Report	Cafú (yellow card) 14'; Ribeiro (yellow card) 20'; Sow (yellow card) 28'; Mighten 49'; Ameobi (yellow card) 59'	Stadium: The Den; Attendance: 0 Referee: Oliver Langford

26 December 2020 21	Nottingham Forest	0–0	Birmingham City	West Bridgford
15:00 GMT	Ribeiro (yellow card) 36'; Grabban (yellow card) 64'; Yates (yellow card) 90+2'	Report	Clayton (yellow card) 42'; Colin (yellow card) 89'	Stadium: The City Ground; Attendance: 0 Referee: Jeremy Simpson

29 December 2020 22	Stoke Cty	1–1	Nottingham Forest	Stoke-on-Trent
20:00 GMT	Thompson 18'; Brown (yellow card) 81'	Report	Chester 65' (o.g.)	Stadium: Bet365 Stadium; Attendance: 0 Referee: Dean Whitestone

2 January 2021 23	Preston North End	0–1	Nottingham Forest	Preston
15:00 GMT	Ledson (yellow card) 24'	Report	Sow (yellow card) 21'; Figueiredo (yellow card) 52'; Grabban 70' (pen.); Taylor (yellow card) 90+6'	Stadium: Deepdale; Attendance: 0 Referee: Tim Robinson

16 January 2021 24	Nottingham Forest	3–1	Millwall	West Bridgford
15:00 GMT	Ameobi 34', 70'; Yates 83'; Samba (yellow card) 90+3'	Report	Thompson 89'	Stadium: The City Ground; Attendance: 0 Referee: Keith Stroud

20 January 2021 25	Nottingham Forest	1–2	Middlesbrough	West Bridgford
19:00 GMT	Sow (yellow card) 33'; Taylor (yellow card) 67'; Mbe Soh 90+3'; Knockaert (yellow card) 90+5'; Ribeiro (red card) 90+7'	Report	Morsy (yellow card) 13'; Assombalonga 14'; Saville 50'; Howson (yellow card) 84'	Stadium: The City Ground; Attendance: 0 Referee: Andy Woolmer

30 January 2021 26	Nottingham Forest	0–0	Barnsley	West Bridgford
15:00 GMT	Bong (yellow card) 35'	Report	Kane (yellow card) 56'; Helik (yellow card) 60'	Stadium: The City Ground; Attendance: 0 Referee: Leigh Doughty

2 February 2021 27	Coventry City	1–2	Nottingham Forest	Birmingham
19:00 GMT	Biamou 17'; O'Hare (yellow card) 53'	Report	Grabban 22'; Rose 53' (o.g.); Knockaert (yellow card) 54'; Krovinović (yellow card) 74'; Colback (yellow card) 90+2'; Bong (yellow card) 90+13'	Stadium: St Andrew's Stadium; Attendance: 0 Referee: Tony Harrington

6 February 2021 28	Wycombe Wanderers	0–3	Nottingham Forest	High Wycombe
15:00 GMT		Report	Murray 7', 54' (pen.); Knockaert 72'	Stadium: Adams Park; Attendance: 0 Referee: James Linington

13 February 2021 29	Nottingham Forest	0–0	Bournemouth	West Bridgford
12:30 GMT	Cafú (yellow card) 11'; Freeman (yellow card) 46'	Report	Smith (yellow card) 45'	Stadium: The City Ground; Attendance: 0 Referee: Chris Kavanagh

17 February 2021 30	Swansea City	1–0	Nottingham Forest	Swansea
19:00 GMT	Bennett (yellow card) 35'; Roberts 87'	Report		Stadium: The Liberty Stadium; Attendance: 0 Referee: Geoff Eltringham

20 February 2021 31	Nottingham Forest	1–0	Blackburn Rovers	West Bridgford
15:00 GMT	Mighten 25'; Murray (yellow card) 41'; Garner (yellow card) 68'	Report	Harwood-Bellis (yellow card) 2'; Armstrong (penalty missed) 73'	Stadium: The City Ground; Attendance: 0 Referee: Keith Stroud

23 February 2021 32	Rotherham United	0–1	Nottingham Forest	Rotherham
19:45 GMT	Ihiekwe (yellow card) 26'; Smith (yellow card) 42'; MacDonald (yellow card) 79'	Report	Yates 67'; Figueiredo (yellow card) 79'	Stadium: New York Stadium; Attendance: 0 Referee: Matt Donohue

26 February 2021 33	Derby County	1–1	Nottingham Forest	Derby
19:45 GMT	Wisdom (yellow card) 82'; Kazim-Richards 84'	Report	Garner 33'	Stadium: Pride Park Stadium; Attendance: 0 Referee: Oliver Langford

2 March 2021 34	Nottingham Forest	0–1	Luton Town	West Bridgford
19:45 GMT		Report	Naismith (yellow card) 61'; Tunnicliffe 64'	Stadium: The City Ground; Attendance: 0 Referee: Jeremy Simpson

6 March 2021 35	Watford	1–0	Nottingham Forest	Watford
12:30 GMT	Masina 17'; Pedro (yellow card) 45+1'; Zinckernagel (yellow card) 50'	Report	Knockaert (yellow card) 10'	Stadium: Vicarage Road; Attendance: 0 Referee: Jonathan Moss

13 March 2021 36	Nottingham Forest	1–1	Reading	West Bridgford
15:00 GMT	Holmes 49' (o.g.); Figueiredo (yellow card) 90+1'	Report	Méïté 81'	Stadium: The City Ground; Attendance: 0 Referee: Steve Martin

17 March 2021 37	Nottingham Forest	0–2	Norwich City	West Bridgford
19:00 GMT		Report	Pukki 9'; Dowell 13'; Skipp (yellow card) 48'	Stadium: The City Ground; Attendance: 0 Referee: Leigh Doughty

20 March 2021 38	Brentford	1–1	Nottingham Forest	London
12:30 GMT	Toney 12' (pen.); Janelt (yellow card) 26'; Dalsgaard (yellow card) 35'; Marcondes (yellow card) 90'	Report	Mighten (yellow card) 25'; Krovinović 63'; Cafú (yellow card) 67'; Ameobi (yellow card) 78'; Figueiredo (yellow card) 90'	Stadium: Brentford Community Stadium; Attendance: 0 Referee: Graham Scott

2 April 2021 39	Cardiff City	0–1	Nottingham Forest	Cardiff
15:00 BST	Pack (yellow card) 14'; Brown (yellow card) 37'	Report	Christie (yellow card) 26'; Garner 29'; Grabban (yellow card) 55'; Cafú (yellow card) 87'	Stadium: Cardiff City Stadium; Referee: Gavin Ward

5 April 2021 40	Nottingham Forest	3–1	Queens Park Rangers	West Bridgford
15:00 BST	Yates (yellow card) 32'; Mighten 44'; Grabban 63'; Krovinović (yellow card) 66'; Garner 69'; Christie (yellow card) 89'	Report	Johansen (yellow card) 73'; Dykes 90+3'	Stadium: The City Ground; Attendance: 0 Referee: Keith Stroud

10 April 2021 41	Bristol City	0–0	Nottingham Forest	Bristol
15:00 BST		Report	McKenna (yellow card) 85'	Stadium: Ashton Gate; Attendance: 0 Referee: Steve Martin

17 April 2021 42	Nottingham Forest	0–2	Huddersfield Town	West Bridgford
12:30 BST		Report	Rowe 45+1'; O'Brien (yellow card) 53'; Pipa (yellow card) 57'; Bacuna 61'	Stadium: The City Ground; Attendance: 0 Referee: Andy Woolmer

21 April 2021 43	Birmingham City	1–1	Nottingham Forest	Birmingham
19:45 BST	Roberts 49'	Report	Grabban 90+7' (pen.)	Stadium: St Andrew's Stadium; Attendance: 0 Referee: Jeremy Simpson

24 April 2021 44	Nottingham Forest	1–1	Stoke City	West Bridgford
15:00 BST	Grabban 50'; Ribeiro (yellow card) 80'	Report	Matondo 27'; Smith (yellow card) 33'	Stadium: The City Ground; Attendance: 0 Referee: Andy Davies

1 May 2021 45	Sheffield Wednesday	0–0	Nottingham Forest	Sheffield
12:30 BST	Palmer (yellow card) 41'; Paterson (yellow card) 61'	Report	Grabban (penalty missed) 45+1'; Yates (yellow card) 47'; Knockaert (yellow card) 69'	Stadium: Hillsborough; Attendance: 0 Referee: Tim Robinson

8 May 2021 46	Nottingham Forest	1–2	Preston North End	West Bridgford
12:30 BST	Garner 17'; Samba (yellow card) 53'	Report	Bayliss 53'; Ledson (yellow card) 63'; Lindsay 67'	Stadium: City Ground; Attendance: 0 Referee: Darren Bond

=== FA Cup ===
The third round draw was made on 30 November, with Premier League and EFL Championship clubs all entering the competition. The draw for the fourth and fifth round were made on 11 January, conducted by Peter Crouch.

9 January 2021 Third round	Nottingham Forest	1–0	Cardiff City	West Bridgford
12:00 GMT	Taylor 3'	Report		Stadium: The City Ground; Attendance: 0 Referee: David Webb

23 January 2021 Fourth round	Swansea City	5–1	Nottingham Forest	Swansea
15:00 GMT	Cullen 7', 67'; Grimes 29', 61' (pen.); O. Cooper 84'	Report	Knockaert 56'	Stadium: Liberty Stadium; Attendance: 0 Referee: Kevin Friend

=== EFL Cup ===
The first round draw was made on 18 August, live on Sky Sports, by Paul Merson.

5 September 2020 First round	Barnsley	1–0	Nottingham Forest	Barnsley
15:00 BST	Williams (yellow card) 31'; Woodrow 49'; Simões (yellow card) 66'	Report		Stadium: Oakwell; Attendance: 0 Referee: Marc Edwards

== Statistics ==
=== Goals and appearances ===
As of match played 8 May 2021 (Note: Players whose names are in italics spent time on loan at other clubs this season.) (Note: Players whose names appear in bold left Nottingham Forest on a permanent basis mid-season.)

No.	Pos	Nat	Player	Total		EFL Championship		FA Cup		EFL Cup	
No.	Pos	Nat	Player	Apps	Goals	Apps	Goals	Apps	Goals	Apps	Goals
2	DF	(Republic of Ireland) IRL	Cyrus Christie	44	0	44	0	0	0	0	0
3	DF	(Portugal) POR	Tobias Figueiredo	34	0	31+1	0	1	0	1	0
4	DF	(England) ENG	Joe Worrall	33	1	31	1	2	0	0	0
5	DF	(Portugal) POR	Yuri Ribeiro	26	1	24+1	1	0	0	1	0
6	DF	(France) FRA	Loïc Mbe Soh	8	1	5+2	1	1	0	0	0
7	FW	(England) ENG	Lewis Grabban	29	6	24+4	6	0	0	1	0
8	MF	(England) ENG	Jack Colback	17	0	13+4	0	0	0	0	0
9	FW	(Cape Verde) CPV	Nuno da Costa	3	0	1+1	0	0	0	1	0
10	MF	(Portugal) POR	João Carvalho	1	0	0	0	0	0	1	0
11	MF	(England) ENG	Sammy Ameobi	34	3	27+5	3	1	0	1	0
12	GK	(England) ENG	Jordan Smith	3	0	1	0	2	0	0	0
13	DF	(Cameroon) CMR	Gaetan Bong	12	0	9+1	0	2	0	0	0
14	MF	(Comoros) COM	Fouad Bachirou	3	0	0+1	0	1	0	1	0
15	MF	(England) ENG	Luke Freeman	25	1	16+7	1	1	0	0+1	0
16	DF	(England) ENG	Carl Jenkinson	5	0	1+2	0	2	0	0	0
17	FW	(England) ENG	Alex Mighten	27	3	13+11	3	0+2	0	0+1	0
18	MF	(Portugal) POR	Cafú	33	0	26+5	0	1+1	0	0	0
19	FW	(Spain) ESP	**Miguel Ángel Guerrero**	11	0	3+6	0	1+1	0	0	0
20	DF	(England) ENG	Michael Dawson	0	0	0	0	0	0	0	0
21	MF	(Mali) MLI	Samba Sow	16	0	12+3	0	0+1	0	0	0
22	MF	(England) ENG	Ryan Yates	36	2	31+3	2	0+1	0	1	0
23	MF	(England) ENG	Joe Lolley	30	1	16+12	1	2	0	0	0
24	DF	(England) ENG	Tyler Blackett	16	0	9+5	0	0+1	0	1	0
25	FW	(England) ENG	Glenn Murray	16	2	8+8	2	0	0	0	0
26	DF	(Scotland) SCO	Scott McKenna	25	1	24	1	1	0	0	0
27	DF	(Zimbabwe) ZIM	**Tendayi Darikwa**	0	0	0	0	0	0	0	0
27	MF	(Croatia) CRO	Filip Krovinović	19	1	19	1	0	0	0	0
28	MF	(France) FRA	Anthony Knockaert	35	3	24+10	2	1	1	0	0
30	GK	(Republic of the Congo) CGO	Brice Samba	46	0	45	0	0	0	1	0
31	MF	(Ireland) EIR	Harry Arter	14	0	8+5	0	1	0	0	0
33	FW	(Montserrat) MSR	Lyle Taylor	42	5	15+24	4	2	1	0+1	0
37	MF	(England) ENG	James Garner	20	4	19+1	4	0	0	0	0
39	GK	(Senegal) SEN	Abdoulaye Diallo	0	0	0	0	0	0	0	0
40	MF	(Wales) WAL	Brennan Johnson	0	0	0	0	0	0	0	0
44	DF	(Cyprus) CYP	Nicholas Ioannou	5	0	5	0	0	0	0	0
46	DF	(England) ENG	Jordan Gabriel	2	0	1	0	0	0	1	0
48	FW	(England) ENG	Will Swan	2	0	0+2	0	0	0	0	0

== Notes ==
This season is notable for all games being played without spectators, due to the Covid-19 pandemic
