= Jack Colback =

English footballer (born 1989)

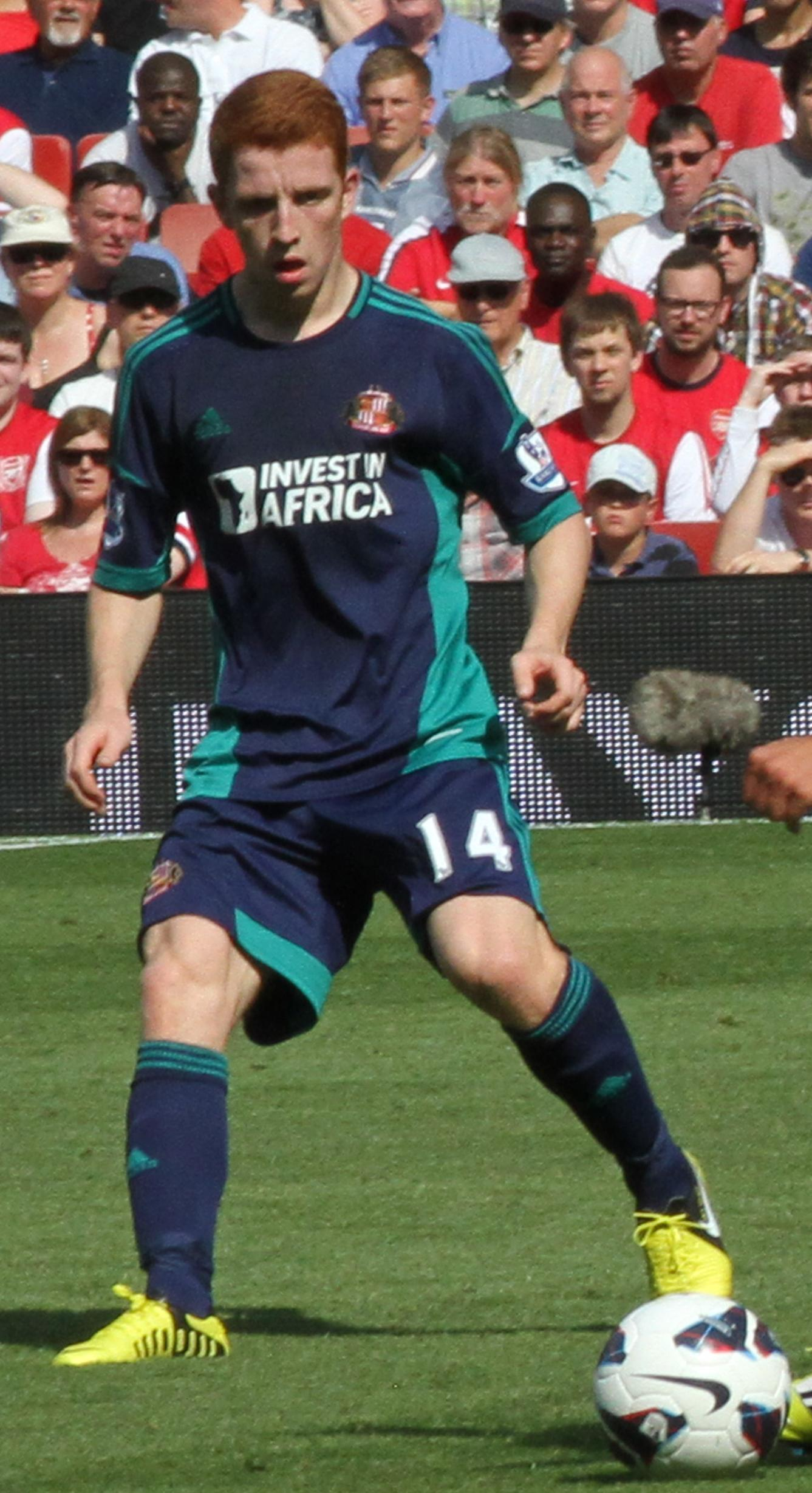
- Colback playing for Sunderland in 2012

Personal information
- Full name: Jack Raymond Colback
- Date of birth: 24 October 1989 (age 37)
- Place of birth: Newcastle upon Tyne, England
- Height: 5 ft 10 in (1.77 m)
- Position: Defensive midfielder

Youth career
- 1999–2008: Sunderland

Senior career*
Years	Team	Apps	(Gls)
2008–2014	Sunderland	115	(4)
2009–2011	→ Ipswich Town (loan)	50	(4)
2014–2020	Newcastle United	93	(5)
2018–2019	→ Nottingham Forest (loan)	54	(4)
2020–2023	Nottingham Forest	66	(3)
2023–2025	Queens Park Rangers	53	(4)
2026	Anstey Nomads	1	(0)

International career
2009	England U20	1	(0)
- * Club domestic league appearances and goals as of 30 December 2025 (UTC)

Jack Raymond Colback (born 24 October 1989) is an English former footballer who played as a defensive midfielder.

Colback began his career at Sunderland's academy, and broke into the team following loans at Ipswich Town of the Championship. After 115 Premier League appearances with Sunderland, his contract expired and he controversially moved to their local rivals, Newcastle United. After he was dropped from the 25-strong Premiership squad for the 2017–18 season, he went on loan to Nottingham Forest for one and a half seasons, then at Queens Park Rangers for another two seasons before signing for Anstey Nomads in February 2026.

He played once for the England national under-20 team in 2009, and was called up for the senior squad for the first time in August 2014.

== Club career ==
=== Sunderland ===
Colback was born in Newcastle upon Tyne, Tyne and Wear and joined the Sunderland academy at the age of 10. On 30 May 2008, Colback signed his first professional contract with the club.

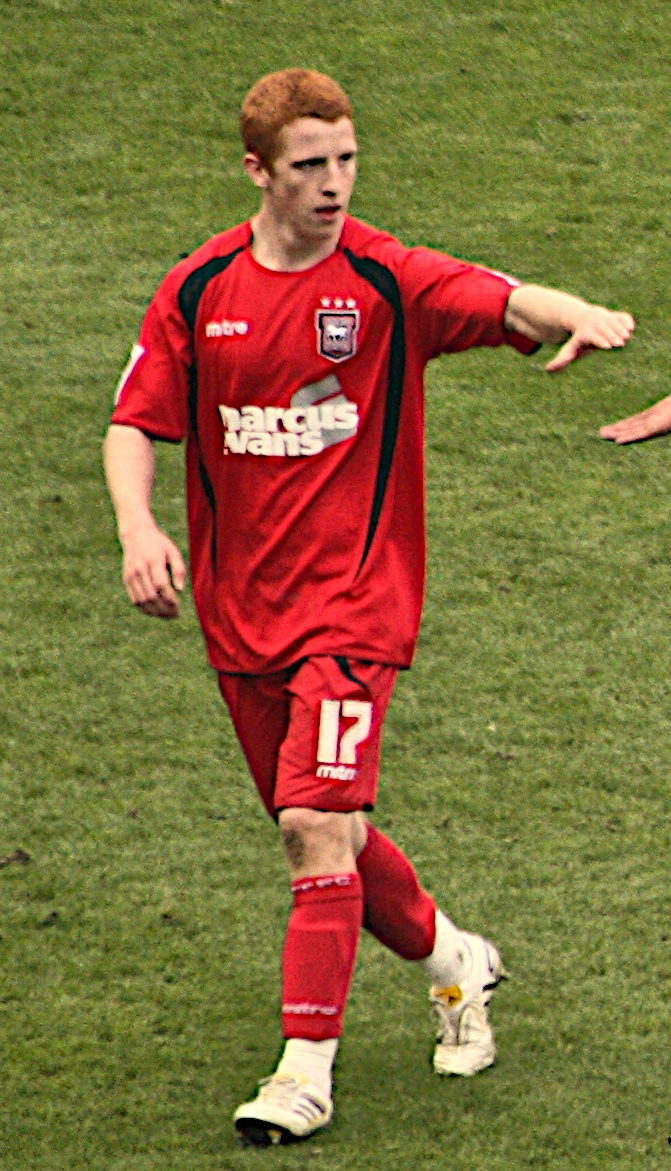
Colback playing for Ipswich Town in 2010.

After manager Steve Bruce announced his intention to loan out Colback, he signed for Ipswich Town on loan on 6 August 2009 on a deal that would expire in January 2010. He made his debut for Ipswich in a 3–3 draw with Shrewsbury Town after extra time in the League Cup, which was won 4–2 in a penalty shootout. His Football League debut came in a 2–0 defeat to West Bromwich Albion after being introduced as a 46th minute substitute. He scored his first goal for Ipswich against Blackpool and scored against them again later on in the season in the FA Cup. His form meant the loan was extended until the end of the 2009–10 season in January 2010. He was voted Ipswich's Players' Player of the Season 2009–10.

He returned to Sunderland from a loan spell at Ipswich Town at the end of the 2009–10 Championship season and made his Premier League debut as a 76th-minute substitute against Wolverhampton Wanderers. He was later sent off for two bookable offences, his debut lasting just nine minutes. He made his home debut against Colchester United in the League Cup on 24 August 2010 as a substitute. Colback went out on loan for a second spell at Ipswich, confirmed on 15 October and which lasted until 6 January when he returned to Sunderland.

Colback returned to Sunderland in January 2011, and his appearances became more frequent. Colback started for Sunderland in their FA Cup 3rd Round defeat to Notts County on 8 January. He then came off the bench as Sunderland drew 1–1 against local rivals and the team Colback supported as a child, Newcastle United, on 16 January. He also appeared as a second-half substitute as Sunderland drew 0–0 with Arsenal on 5 March. Colback made his first Premier League start for Sunderland in their 2–0 defeat at Birmingham City on 16 April. Colback also started the following week as Sunderland beat Wigan Athletic 4–1. Colback had arguably his best performance in a Sunderland shirt in their 2–1 win at Bolton on 7 May 2011. Colback demonstrated his versatility by being deployed at left back in the final game of the season at West Ham.

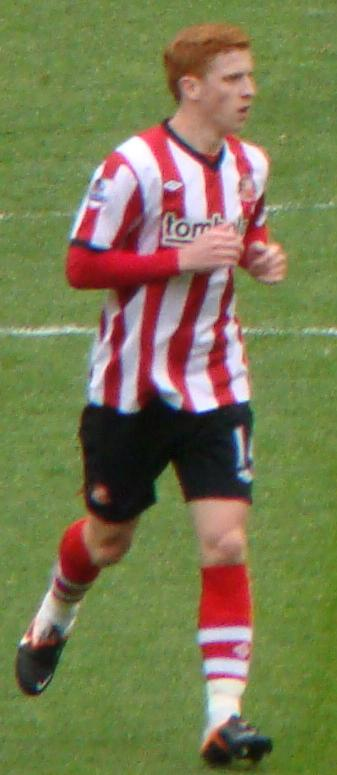
Colback in the match against Manchester United on the final day of the 2011–12 Premier League season.

Colback started the first game of the 2011–12 season, as Sunderland drew with Liverpool at Anfield. Sunderland drew 1–1 with Colback playing alongside Lee Cattermole in central midfield. On 26 December 2011, Colback scored his first goal for the club, a deflected effort, in 1–1 draw with Everton in the Premier League. Colback was deployed at left back on New Year's Day 2012 against Manchester City, and helped Sunderland to a surprise victory against the Premier League leaders. He again played at left back in Sunderland's 4–2 win at Wigan two days later, where he sustained a knee injury which ruled him out for a few weeks. On 5 January 2012, he signed a 2-year contract extension which expired in June 2014. Colback returned from injury as a substitute in Sunderland's 1–1 FA Cup draw with Middlesbrough, and returned to the starting line up in central midfield as the Black Cats beat Norwich 3–0 on 1 February. He scored his second goal for Sunderland with a left footed strike in the replay against Middlesbrough at the Riverside Stadium, as Sunderland won 2–1 after extra time to reach the fifth round.

The 2012–13 season saw Colback play regularly at left back due to injuries to Danny Rose, and right back in the Tyne-Wear derby as Sunderland defeated Newcastle 3–0. Following this, Colback was more willing to play out of position, to help the club solve their injury issues.

Following Rose's return to Tottenham, Colback began the 2013–14 season as Sunderland's first choice at left back, before being moved back into central midfield by Gus Poyet. On 28 December Colback scored a last minute goal in the fifth minute of injury time to salvage a 2–2 draw at Cardiff City. Colback made his 100th Premier League appearance on 1 January 2014 in a 1–0 home defeat to Aston Villa. He scored his second goal of the season on 1 February 2014, scoring the third goal in a 3–0 away win against Newcastle United. He scored his third goal of the season on 7 May 2014, scoring the first goal in a 2–0 home win to West Brom, to retain Sunderland's top division safety and relegating Norwich City to the Football League Championship.

With his contract about to expire at the end of the 2013–14 season, then-manager Paolo Di Canio urged to Colback to make a decision on his future at Sunderland. In November, Colback confirmed that talks of a new deal had started after initially rejecting a new contract in the summer under the management of Di Canio. Further talks over a new contract continued in February. In April, it was reported that Colback had turned down a new contract with the club and was set to depart upon the expiry of the contract. Several Premier League clubs made contract offers to sign Colback, but Sunderland refused to give up on Colback and hoped he would stay at the club.

=== Newcastle United ===
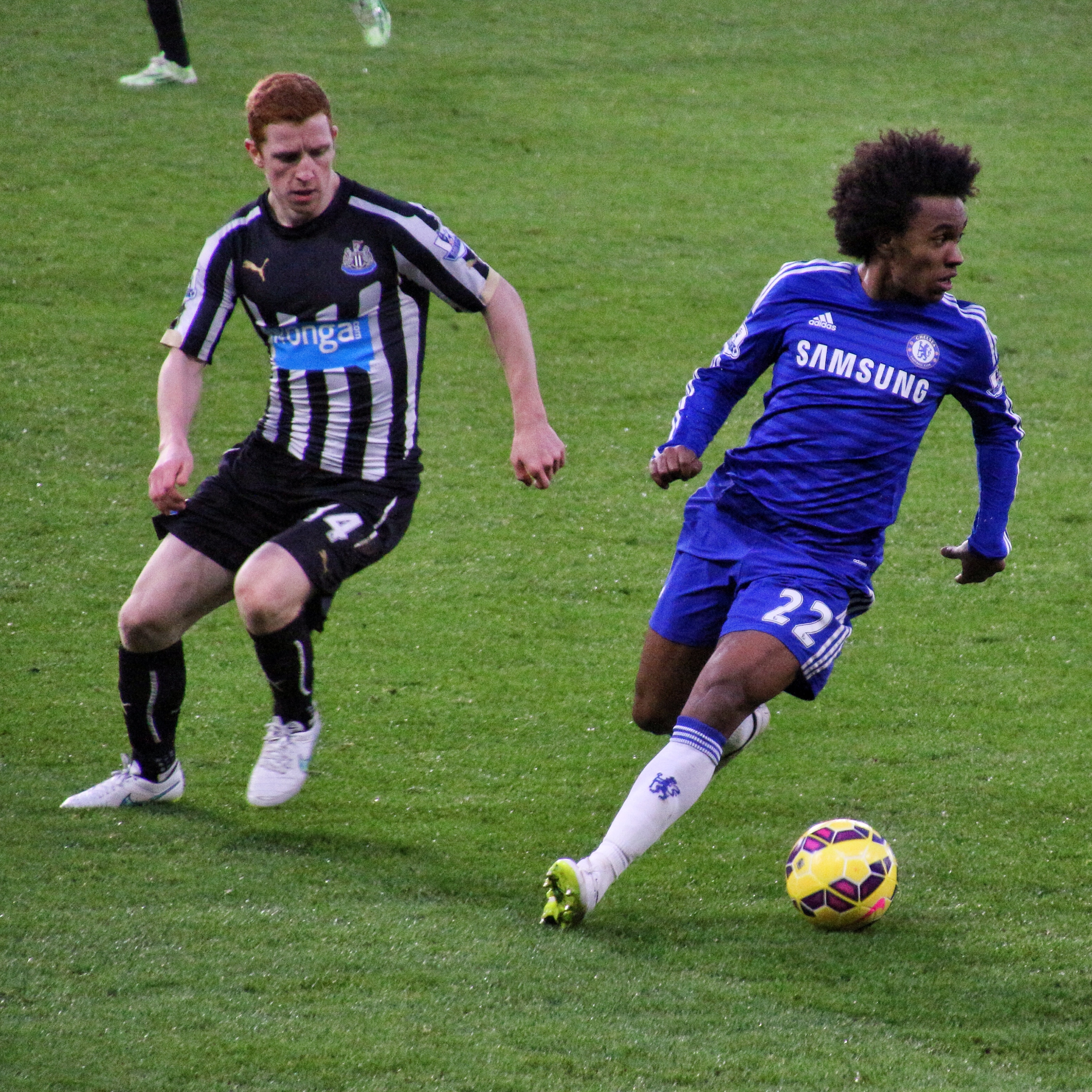
Colback marking Willian in a 2–0 loss against Chelsea on 10 January 2015.

On 9 June 2014, Colback signed for Newcastle United on a free transfer, becoming the first player since Lionel Pérez in 1998 to transfer directly from Sunderland to Newcastle. As a supporter of Newcastle he admitted that due to the rivalry between the two clubs, Sunderland fans would "hate [him] for the rest of [his] life". Sunderland criticised Colback's move to Newcastle United, and described the transfer as leaving a "bitter taste".

Colback made his competitive debut on 17 August as Newcastle began the season with a 2–0 defeat at home to Manchester City, playing the full 90 minutes. Colback scored his first goal for the club on 28 December in a 3–2 win over Everton, intercepting a Ross Barkley clearance to score Newcastle's third of the match. Four days later he scored in the second consecutive game, a 25-yard strike in a 3–3 draw against Burnley.

Colback was targeted by Hull City and Wolverhampton Wanderers for a loan deal in August 2017. He turned down the offers due to geographical reasons and instead started training with the junior team. He was excluded from the club's official team photo for the 2017–18 season. Benítez justified his exclusion by saying that the club "had decided the squad before".

On 23 June 2020, Colback was released by Newcastle United.

=== Nottingham Forest ===
In January 2018, Colback joined Championship club Nottingham Forest on loan for the rest of the 2017–18 season. After joining Forest, he accused Newcastle United manager Rafael Benítez of disrespecting him during his stint at the club, claiming that he was "treated more like a number than a human being". That July, Colback returned to Forest on a season-long loan, with an option to make a permanent transfer at the end of the season.

After the permanent transfer to Forest did not occur, Colback remained at Newcastle for a further season before returning to Forest on a free transfer from 11 August 2020 onwards. Colback had continued to live in Nottingham after his return to Newcastle United, as his wife and children had settled in the city. His third Forest debut came on 12 September, in a losing effort to Queens Park Rangers. Colback was released by Forest on 2 June 2023.

=== Queens Park Rangers ===
Colback joined QPR on 1 August 2023, signing a two-year deal. He made his debut for the club as a half time substitute in the 1–0 loss to Ipswich Town. A week later, Colback scored his first goal for Queens Park Rangers in a 2–1 away loss to Southampton. The following week, he scored again, this time in a 2–0 away win against Middlesbrough.

On 1 September 2025, Queens Park Rangers confirmed that Colback would not be returning to the club with his contract having expired at the end of the 2024–25 season.

=== Anstey Nomads ===
After spending six months without a club, Colback joined eighth-tier side Anstey Nomads in February 2026.

== International career ==
Colback has received one cap for the England under-20 team, he played in a 2–0 friendly win against Italy at Loftus Road in March 2009. He replaced Marc Albrighton in the 79th minute as a substitute.

On 28 August 2014, Colback received his first call-up to the senior team for the matches against Norway and Switzerland, but had to withdraw from the squad with a calf injury.

== Career statistics ==
As of end of 2024–25 season

Appearances and goals by club, season and competition
Club	Season	League			FA Cup		League Cup		Other		Total	
Club	Season	Division	Apps	Goals	Apps	Goals	Apps	Goals	Apps	Goals	Apps	Goals
Sunderland	2008–09	Premier League	0	0	0	0	0	0	–		0	0
Sunderland	2009–10	Premier League	1	0	0	0	0	0	–		1	0
Sunderland	2010–11	Premier League	11	0	1	0	1	0	–		13	0
Sunderland	2011–12	Premier League	35	1	4	1	1	0	–		40	2
Sunderland	2012–13	Premier League	35	0	2	0	3	0	–		40	0
Sunderland	2013–14	Premier League	32	3	4	0	5	0	–		41	3
Sunderland	Total		114	4	11	1	10	0	–		135	5
Ipswich Town (loan)	2009–10	Championship	37	4	2	1	2	0	–		41	5
Ipswich Town (loan)	2010–11	Championship	13	0	0	0	1	0	–		14	0
Ipswich Town (loan)	Total		50	4	2	1	3	0	–		55	5
Newcastle United	2014–15	Premier League	35	4	0	0	3	0	–		38	4
Newcastle United	2015–16	Premier League	29	1	0	0	1	0	–		30	1
Newcastle United	2016–17	Championship	29	0	2	0	3	0	–		34	0
Newcastle United	2017–18	Premier League	0	0	0	0	0	0	–		0	0
Newcastle United	2018–19	Premier League	0	0	0	0	0	0	–		0	0
Newcastle United	2019–20	Premier League	0	0	0	0	0	0	–		0	0
Newcastle United	Total		93	5	2	0	7	0	–		102	5
Nottingham Forest (loan)	2017–18	Championship	16	1	0	0	0	0	–		16	1
Nottingham Forest (loan)	2018–19	Championship	38	3	1	0	0	0	–		39	3
Nottingham Forest (loan)	Total		54	4	1	0	0	0	–		55	4
Nottingham Forest	2020–21	Championship	17	0	0	0	0	0	–		17	0
Nottingham Forest	2021–22	Championship	38	3	4	0	1	0	3 (Note: Appearances in Championship play-offs)	1	46	4
Nottingham Forest	2022–23	Premier League	11	0	1	0	4	0	–		16	0
Nottingham Forest	Total		66	3	5	0	5	0	3	1	79	4
Queens Park Rangers	2023–24	Championship	29	3	0	0	0	0	—		29	3
Queens Park Rangers	2024–25	Championship	24	1	1	0	1	0	—		26	1
Queens Park Rangers	Total		53	4	1	0	1	0	—		55	4
Career total			430	24	22	2	26	0	3	1	481	27

== Honours ==
Sunderland

- Football League Cup runner-up: 2013–14

Newcastle United

- EFL Championship: 2016–17

Nottingham Forest

- EFL Championship play-offs: 2022

Individual

- Ipswich Town Players' Player of the Year: 2009–10
- Ipswich Town Goal of the Season: 2009–10
- Nottingham Forest Goal of the Season: 2021–22
