= Ryan Yates =

English footballer (born 1997)

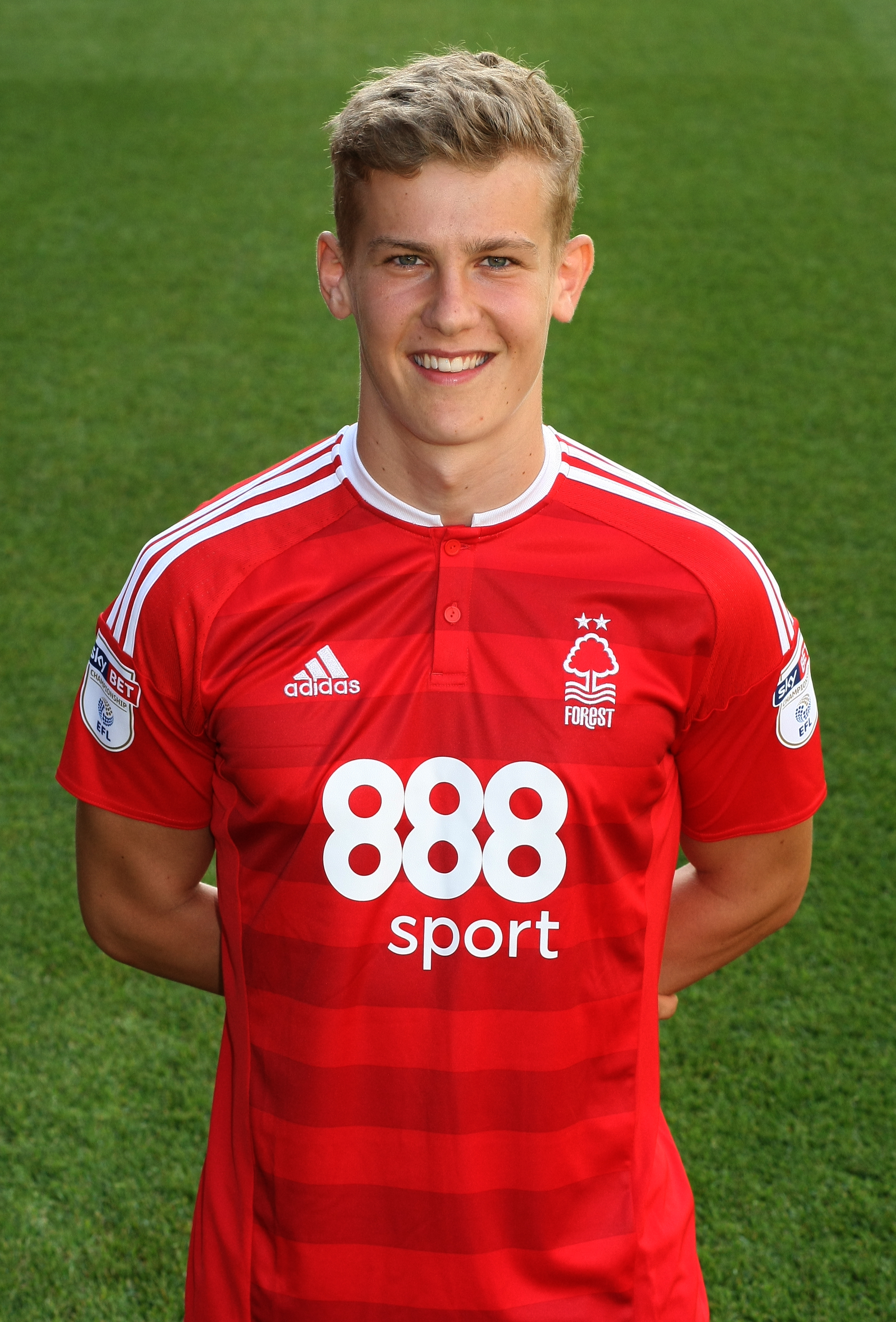
- Yates with Nottingham Forest in 2016

Personal information
- Full name: Ryan James Yates
- Date of birth: 21 November 1997 (age 28)
- Place of birth: Lincoln, Lincolnshire, England
- Height: 6 ft 3 in (1.90 m)
- Position: Midfielder

Team information
- Current team: Nottingham Forest
- Number: 22

Youth career
- 2005–2016: Nottingham Forest

Senior career*
Years	Team	Apps	(Gls)
2016–	Nottingham Forest	239	(17)
2016–2017	→ Barrow (loan)	16	(1)
2017	→ Shrewsbury Town (loan)	12	(0)
2017–2018	→ Notts County (loan)	25	(3)
2018	→ Scunthorpe United (loan)	16	(2)
- * Club domestic league appearances and goals as of 17:04, 31 October 2026 (UTC)

Ryan James Yates (born 21 November 1997) is an English professional footballer who plays as a midfielder for and captains Premier League club Nottingham Forest.

Having joined Nottingham Forest’s youth academy in 2005, Yates graduated from the youth system, and signed professionally with the club in 2016, going on to make over 200 league appearances for the club as the current captain.

== Club career ==
=== Nottingham Forest ===
==== Loan to Barrow ====
Yates was named as part of the Nottingham Forest first-team squad at the start of the 2016–17 season, before heading north to National League side Barrow for an initial period of one-month on 26 August 2016. On 21 September Barrow opted to extend the loan deal, and again on 2 November until 9 January 2017. After this final extension to the deal, Barrow manager Paul Cox said of Yates: "He's a diamond in terms of wanting to learn, wanting to get better, wanting to get stronger. That's what makes Ryan so potent in this squad. He rubs off on other people with his hunger and desire." Yates was recalled by Forest on 13 January, having made nineteen appearances and scoring twice in all competitions for Barrow.

==== Loan to Shrewsbury Town ====
On 31 January, shortly after his recall from Barrow, Yates was loaned out to League One's Shrewsbury Town for the remainder of the season. He made his professional league debut on 14 February as a 64th-minute substitute of a 2–1 loss to Peterborough United. On 27 February, whilst on loan with Shrewsbury Town, Yates extended his contract at Forest until 2019. Yates was shown the first red card of his professional career on 1 April for two sliding tackles in a game at Bristol Rovers, despite having been pushed to the floor by the opponent's players after the second challenge, in a decision described by his loan club as "harsh".

==== Loan to Notts County ====
On 4 August 2017 Yates joined Notts County on loan for the 2017–18 season, joining fellow Forest midfielder Jorge Grant at the club. His debut for the club came on 8 August away at Scunthorpe United in the first round of the EFL Cup. Yates started the match and scored in the last minute of the second period of extra time to equalise the score to 3–3. Although Notts lost the subsequent penalty shootout, Yates received praise from his manager Kevin Nolan, who described the teenager as a "leader" with "bags and bags of potential".

==== Loan to Scunthorpe United ====
On 11 January 2018, Yates signed a deal keeping him at Nottingham Forest until 2020, and was recalled from his loan at Notts County to join League One club Scunthorpe United for the remainder of the 2017–18 season. He scored on his Iron debut against Peterborough United, in what the Scunthorpe Telegraph described as a "man of the match performance". Sky Sports awarded Yates the man of the match trophy for the 1–1 draw with Oxford United on 30 March.

==== Return to Forest ====
On 5 July 2018, Yates signed a new three-year deal with Nottingham Forest, keeping him at the club until 2021. He made his debut for Nottingham Forest on 14 August 2018, in the EFL Cup in a 1–1 draw with Bury which Forest won on penalties. He scored his first goal for the club on 12 February 2019, in a 2–2 draw with West Bromwich Albion. On 5 December 2019, he extended his contract until 2023.

Yates received praise for his performances during the 2021–22 season, with a particular increase in his goal output. He was heavily involved in the Nottingham Forest team which gained promotion to the Premier League for the first time in 23 years, making 43 EFL Championship appearances, three play-off appearances, and scoring eight league goals. He featured in the EFL Championship Team of the Season. Nottingham Forest manager Steve Cooper has described Yates as a "culture-setter" within the Nottingham Forest team.

On 4 May 2024, Yates scored in a 3–1 win against Sheffield United, which made Yates join a select group of players to have scored in all five top divisions of English football. Later that year, on 29 July, Yates signed a new four-year deal with Forest, committing himself to the club until 2028.

He scored his first goal in European club football on 27 November 2025, in a 3–0 win against Malmö in the UEFA Europa League.

== Career statistics ==
As of match played 31 October 2026

Appearances and goals by club, season and competition
Club	Season	League			FA Cup		EFL Cup		Europe		Other		Total	
Club	Season	Division	Apps	Goals	Apps	Goals	Apps	Goals	Apps	Goals	Apps	Goals	Apps	Goals
Nottingham Forest	2018–19	Championship	16	1	0	0	1	0	—		—		17	1
Nottingham Forest	2019–20	Championship	27	3	1	0	0	0	—		—		28	3
Nottingham Forest	2020–21	Championship	34	2	1	0	1	0	—		—		36	2
Nottingham Forest	2021–22	Championship	43	8	4	1	1	0	—		3 (Note: Appearances in Championship play-offs)	0	51	9
Nottingham Forest	2022–23	Premier League	26	0	1	1	4	1	—		—		31	2
Nottingham Forest	2023–24	Premier League	35	1	4	0	1	0	—		—		40	1
Nottingham Forest	2024–25	Premier League	35	2	4	2	0	0	—		—		39	4
Nottingham Forest	2025–26	Premier League	22	0	0	0	1	0	12 (Note: Appearances in UEFA Europa League)	2	—		35	2
Nottingham Forest	2026–27	Premier League	1	0	0	0	0	0	—		—		1	0
Nottingham Forest	Total		239	17	15	4	9	1	12	2	3	0	278	24
Barrow (loan)	2016–17	National League	16	1	3	1	—		—		0	0	19	2
Shrewsbury Town (loan)	2016–17	League One	12	0	—		—		—		—		12	0
Notts County (loan)	2017–18	League Two	25	3	3	2	1	1	—		0	0	29	6
Scunthorpe United (loan)	2017–18	League One	16	2	—		—		—		2 (Note: Appearances in League One play-offs)	0	18	2
Career total			308	23	21	7	10	2	12	2	5	0	356	34

== Honours ==
Nottingham Forest

- EFL Championship play-offs: 2022

Individual

- EFL Championship Team of the Season: 2021–22
