= 2019–20 Nottingham Forest F.C. season =

English football club season

Nottingham Forest
2019–20 season
- Owner: Evangelos Marinakis; Sokratis Kominakis
- Chairman: Nicholas Randall QC
- Head Coach: Sabri Lamouchi
- Stadium: City Ground
- Championship: 7th
- FA Cup: Third round (eliminated by Chelsea)
- EFL Cup: Third round (eliminated by Arsenal)
- Top goalscorer: League: Lewis Grabban (20); All: Lewis Grabban (20)
- Highest home attendance: 29,455 (vs. Leeds United, EFL Championship, 8 February 2020)
- Lowest home attendance: 7,432 (vs. Fleetwood Town, EFL Cup, 13 August 2019)
- Average home league attendance: 27,724
Home colours	Away colours

The 2019–20 season was Nottingham Forest's 154th year in existence and 12th consecutive season in the EFL Championship. In addition to the Championship, the club participated in the FA Cup and the EFL Cup. The season covered the period between 1 July 2019 and 22 July 2020.

== First team squad ==
As of 31 January 2020

No.	Player	Nationality	Date of birth (age)	Joined from	Joined first team	Contract ends
Goalkeepers
12	Jordan Smith	ENG	8 December 1994 (aged 25)	Academy	2016	2020
30	Brice Samba	CGO	25 April 1994 (aged 26)	Caen (FRA)	2019	2023
49	Arijanet Muric	KOS	7 November 1998 (aged 21)	Manchester City	2019	2020
Defenders
2	Yuri Ribeiro	POR	24 January 1997 (aged 23)	Benfica (POR)	2019	–
3	Tobias Figueiredo	POR	2 February 1994 (aged 26)	Sporting CP (POR)	2018	2022
4	Joe Worrall	ENG	10 January 1997 (aged 23)	Academy	2016	2024
6	Gaëtan Bong	CMR	25 April 1988 (aged 32)	Brighton & Hove Albion	2020	2022
16	Carl Jenkinson	ENG	8 February 1992 (aged 28)	Arsenal	2019	2022
20	Michael Dawson	ENG	18 November 1983 (aged 36)	Hull City	2018	2021
27	Tendayi Darikwa	ZIM	13 December 1991 (aged 28)	Burnley	2017	2021
29	Yohan Benalouane	TUN	28 March 1987 (aged 33)	Leicester City	2019	2021
44	Michael Hefele	GER	30 January 1992 (aged 28)	Huddersfield Town	2018	2021
Midfielders
8	Ben Watson	ENG	9 July 1985 (aged 35)	Watford	2018	2020
10	João Carvalho	POR	9 March 1997 (aged 23)	Benfica (POR)	2018	2023
11	Matty Cash	ENG	7 August 1997 (aged 22)	Academy	2016	2023
13	John Bostock	ENG	15 January 1992 (aged 28)	Toulouse (FRA)	2019	2020
17	Alfa Semedo	GNB	30 August 1997 (aged 22)	Benfica (POR)	2019	2020
19	Sammy Ameobi	ENG	1 May 1992 (aged 28)	Bolton Wanderers	2019	2020
21	Samba Sow	MLI	29 April 1989 (aged 31)	Dynamo Moscow (RUS)	2019	2021
22	Ryan Yates	ENG	21 November 1997 (aged 22)	Academy	2016	2023
23	Joe Lolley	ENG	25 August 1992 (aged 27)	Huddersfield Town	2018	2023
28	Tiago Silva	POR	2 June 1993 (aged 27)	Feirense (POR)	2019	2021
40	Brennan Johnson	WAL	23 May 2001 (aged 19)	Academy	2019	–
Forwards
7	Lewis Grabban	ENG	12 January 1988 (aged 32)	Bournemouth	2018	2022
9	Nuno da Costa	CPV	10 February 1991 (aged 29)	Strasbourg (FRA)	2020	–
14	Adama Diakhaby	FRA	5 July 1996 (aged 24)	Huddersfield Town	2020	2020
34	Tyler Walker	ENG	17 October 1996 (aged 23)	Academy	2017	2021
39	Zach Clough	ENG	8 March 1995 (aged 25)	Bolton Wanderers	2017	2021
48	Alex Mighten	ENG	11 April 2002 (aged 18)	Academy	2020	2022

=== New contracts ===
Date	Position	Nationality	Player	Old contract end	New contract end	Ref.
28 November 2019	MF	ENG	Matty Cash	2021	2023	
5 December 2019	MF	ENG	Ryan Yates	2021	2023	
11 December 2019	MF	ENG	Tyrese Fornah	–	2022	
13 December 2019	FW	ENG	Alex Mighten	–	2022	
21 January 2020	MF	ENG	Jake Taylor	2020	2021	
13 February 2020	DF	ENG	Joe Worrall	2022	2024	
19 February 2020	DF	SCO	Jordan Lawrence-Gabriel	2020	2022	
17 June 2020	DF	ENG	Michael Dawson	2020	2021	

== Pre-season ==
Forest announced a pre-season schedule of friendlies against Alfreton Town, Dundee, Atromitos, Olympiacos, Crystal Palace and Real Sociedad. The first team were relieved of friendlies arranged against Peterborough United, Mansfield Town and Lincoln City following the appointment of Sabri Lamouchi as head coach on 28 June 2019.

29 June 2019 Friendly	Alfreton Town	1–2	Nottingham Forest	Alfreton
15:00 BST	Bacon 16'	Report	Johnson 39'; Ansarifard 83'	Stadium: Impact Arena; Attendance: 1,799

2 July 2019 Friendly	Nottingham Forest	0–0	Dundee	San Pedro del Pinatar, Spain
17:30 BST		Report		Stadium: Estadio José Antonio Pérez

13 July 2019 Friendly	Atromitos	0–3	Nottingham Forest	Athens, Greece
21:00 EEST		Report	Ameobi 20'; Dawson 64'; Lolley 90'	Stadium: Peristeri Stadium

16 July 2019 Friendly	Olympiacos	3–0	Nottingham Forest	Piraeus, Greece
19:30 BST	Masouras 3'; Guerrero 7' 33'	Report		Stadium: Karaiskakis Stadium

19 July 2019 Friendly	Nottingham Forest	1–0	Crystal Palace	West Bridgford
19:45 BST	Adomah 32'	Report		Stadium: City Ground; Attendance: 14,719; Referee: Steve Martin

23 July 2019 Friendly	Mansfield Town	2–1	Nottingham Forest Under 23s	Mansfield
19:30 BST	Stewart 33' (o.g.); Maynard 84'	Report	Cummings 10'	Stadium: One Call Stadium; Attendance: 3,202; Referee: David Coote
Note: Originally billed as a first team friendly

26 July 2019 Friendly	Nottingham Forest	2–2	Real Sociedad	West Bridgford
19:45 BST	Worrall 4'; Grabban 28'	Report	López 13'; Djouahra 88'	Stadium: City Ground; Attendance: 14,216; Referee: Jez Simpson

29 July 2019 Friendly	Lincoln City	1–1	Nottingham Forest XI	Lincoln
19:30 BST	Bostwick 25'	Report	Gomis 73'	Stadium: Sincil Bank; Attendance: 3,803; Referee: Kevin Friend
Note: Originally billed as a first team friendly

== Competitions ==
=== League table ===
Pos	Team	Pld	W	D	L	GF	GA	GD	Pts	Promotion, qualification or relegation
4	Fulham (O, P)	46	23	12	11	64	48	+16	81	Qualification for Championship play-offs (Note: Four teams play for one spot and promotion to the Premier League.)
5	Cardiff City	46	19	16	11	68	58	+10	73	Qualification for Championship play-offs
6	Swansea City	46	18	16	12	62	53	+9	70	Qualification for Championship play-offs
7	Nottingham Forest	46	18	16	12	58	50	+8	70	
8	Millwall	46	17	17	12	57	51	+6	68	
9	Preston North End	46	18	12	16	59	54	+5	66	
10	Derby County	46	17	13	16	62	64	−2	64	

Source: EFL Official Website
Rules for classification: 1) Points; 2) Goal difference; 3) Number of goals scored; 4) Head-to-head results; 5) Wins; 6) Away goals; 7) Penalty points (sec 9.5); 8) 12-point sending off offences
(O) Play-off winners; (P) Promoted

==== Results summary ====
Overall								Home						Away					
Pld	W	D	L	GF	GA	GD	Pts	W	D	L	GF	GA	GD	W	D	L	GF	GA	GD
46	18	16	12	58	50	+8	70	10	5	8	27	27	0	8	11	4	31	23	+8

Last updated: 22 July 2020.
Source: BBC February 2020

==== Results by matchday ====
Matchday	1	2	3	4	5	6	7	8	9	10	11	12	13	14	15	16	17	18	19	20	21	22	23	24	25	26	27	28	29	30	31	32	33	34	35	36	37	38	39	40	41	42	43	44	45	46
Ground	H	A	H	A	A	H	A	H	A	A	H	A	H	A	H	A	A	H	A	H	H	A	A	H	H	A	H	H	A	A	H	H	A	H	A	A	H	A	H	H	A	H	A	H	A	H
Result	L	D	W	D	W	D	W	W	W	D	W	L	L	W	W	D	W	L	D	D	L	L	W	W	W	D	W	D	W	L	W	L	D	D	W	D	L	D	W	W	D	L	D	D	L	L
Position	19	20	9	13	9	10	9	6	3	4	2	4	8	5	5	5	4	4	4	5	8	9	7	5	4	5	5	4	3	4	4	5	5	5	4	4	5	5	4	4	5	5	5	5	5	7

Updated to match(es) played on 22 July 2020. Source: Statto.com
A = Away; H = Home; W = Win; D = Draw; L = Loss

==== Matches ====
3 August 2019 1	Nottingham Forest	1–2	West Bromwich Albion	West Bridgford
17:30 BST	Cash 9'	Report	Edwards 15'; Phillips 26'; Sawyers (yellow card) 85'	Stadium: City Ground; Attendance: 27,592 (1,991 away); Referee: Darren England
Note: Live on Sky Sports

10 August 2019 2	Leeds United	1–1	Nottingham Forest	Leeds
12:30 BST	Phillips (yellow card) 28'; Hernández 59'; Forshaw (yellow card) 80'	Report	Sow (yellow card) 71'; Grabban 77'; Robinson (yellow card) 90'	Stadium: Elland Road; Attendance: 35,453 (2,001 away); Referee: Robert Jones
Note: Live on Sky Sports

17 August 2019 3	Nottingham Forest	3–0	Birmingham City	West Bridgford
15:00 BST	Lolley 15'; Grabban 22'; Dawson 64'	Report	Šunjić (yellow card) 15'; Giménez (yellow card) 62'	Stadium: City Ground; Attendance: 27,281 (1,995 away); Referee: Tony Harrington

21 August 2019 4	Charlton Athletic	1–1	Nottingham Forest	Charlton, London
19:45 BST	Taylor 18' (yellow card) 63'; Lockyer (yellow card) 54'; Pratley (yellow card) 89'	Report	Watson (yellow card) 43'; Ameobi (yellow card) 63'; Adomah 78'; Jenkinson (yellow card) 89'	Stadium: The Valley; Attendance: 17,204 (1,751 away); Referee: Oliver Langford

24 August 2019 5	Fulham	1–2	Nottingham Forest	Fulham, London
15:00 BST	Arter (yellow card) 50'; Mitrović 83'; Kamara (yellow card) 90'	Report	Grabban 4' 61'; Ameobi (yellow card) 33'; Semedo (yellow card) 66'; Samba (yellow card) 77'; Adomah (yellow card) 90'	Stadium: Craven Cottage; Attendance: 18,186 (1,900 away); Referee: Peter Bankes

31 August 2019 6	Nottingham Forest	1–1	Preston North End	West Bridgford
15:00 BST	Grabban (yellow card) 70'; Silva (yellow card) 74'; Adomah 79'; Sow (yellow card) 83'; Jenkinson (yellow card) 90'	Report	Bodin 40'; Harrop (yellow card) 50'	Stadium: City Ground; Attendance: 27,249 (1,610 away); Referee: Geoff Eltringham

14 September 2019 7	Swansea City	0–1	Nottingham Forest	Swansea
15:00 BST	Roberts (yellow card) 70' van der Hoorn (yellow card) 90'	Report	Sow (yellow card) 64'; Semedo 85'	Stadium: Liberty Stadium; Attendance: 17,102 (1,259 away); Referee: James Linington

21 September 2019 8	Nottingham Forest	1–0	Barnsley	West Bridgford
15:00 BST	Cash (yellow card) 24'; Watson 56'; Samba (yellow card) 90'	Report	Williams (yellow card) 29'; Halme (yellow card) 52'; Chaplin (yellow card) 90'	Stadium: City Ground; Attendance: 29,202 (1,952 away); Referee: Jarred Gillett

27 September 2019 9	Stoke City	2–3	Nottingham Forest	Stoke-on-Trent
20:00 BST	Gregory 10'; McClean 84'	Report	Lolley (yellow card) 20' (goal) 36'; Dawson (yellow card) 23'; Sow (yellow card) 38'; Ameobi 47'; Grabban 61'; Watson (yellow card) 70'	Stadium: bet365 Stadium; Attendance: 23,800 (2,783 away); Referee: Andrew Madley
Note: Live on Sky Sports

1 October 2019 10	Blackburn Rovers	1–1	Nottingham Forest	Blackburn
19:45 BST	Lenihan (yellow card) 22'; Downing (yellow card) 60'; Armstrong 63'	Report	Ameobi (yellow card) 33'; Lolley 65'	Stadium: Ewood Park; Attendance: 12,521 (1,138 away); Referee: Stephen Martin

5 October 2019 11	Nottingham Forest	1–0	Brentford	West Bridgford
15:00 BST	Watson 56'	Report	Canós (yellow card) 35'	Stadium: City Ground; Attendance: 27,596 (1,005 away); Referee: Dean Whitestone

20 October 2019 12	Wigan Athletic	1–0	Nottingham Forest	Wigan
14:00 BST	Lowe 35'; Macleod (yellow card) 41'; Byrne (yellow card) 51'; Jacobs (yellow card) 82'	Report	Ribeiro (yellow card) 90'	Stadium: DW Stadium; Attendance: 13,077 (3,525 away); Referee: Matthew Donohue
Note: Live on Sky Sports

23 October 2019 13	Nottingham Forest	1–2	Hull City	West Bridgford
19:45 BST	Silva (yellow card) 15'; Robinson (yellow card) 40'; Cash 55'; Samba (yellow card) 90'	Report	Magennis 38' (red card) 68'; Bowen 48' (yellow card) 88'; Long (yellow card) 89'	Stadium: City Ground; Attendance: 27,624 (690 away); Referee: Oliver Langford

26 October 2019	Nottingham Forest	v	Reading	West Bridgford
15:00 BST		Report		Stadium: City Ground
Note: Fixture postponed (waterlogged pitch)

2 November 2019 14	Luton Town	1–2	Nottingham Forest	Luton
15:00 GMT	McManaman 87'	Report	Grabban 39'; Ameobi 58'; Worrall (yellow card) 69'	Stadium: Kenilworth Road; Attendance: 10,053 (1,017 away); Referee: Gavin Ward

9 November 2019 15	Nottingham Forest	1–0	Derby County	West Bridgford
12:30 GMT	Watson (yellow card) 31'; Grabban 56' (yellow card) 69'; Adomah (yellow card) 90'	Report	Bogle (yellow card) 28'; Bielik (yellow card) 60'; Lawrence (yellow card) 70'	Stadium: City Ground; Attendance: 29,314 (1,989 away); Referee: Darren England
Note: Live on Sky Sports

23 November 2019 16	Bristol City	0–0	Nottingham Forest	Bristol
15:00 GMT	Rodri (yellow card) 84'	Report	Ameobi (yellow card) 36'; Yates (red card) 56'; Samba (yellow card) 86'	Stadium: Ashton Gate Stadium; Attendance: 23,573 (2,309 away); Referee: Craig Pawson

27 November 2019 17	Queens Park Rangers	0–4	Nottingham Forest	Shepherd's Bush, London
19:45 GMT	Wallace (red card) 50'; Scowen (yellow card) 57'	Report	Figueiredo 15'; Cash (yellow card) 52'; Bostock (yellow card) 76'; Grabban 81'; Carvalho 88'; Semedo 90'	Stadium: Kiyan Prince Foundation Stadium; Attendance: 12,937 (1,860 away); Referee: Steve Martin

30 November 2019 18	Nottingham Forest	0–1	Cardiff City	West Bridgford
15:00 GMT		Report	Mendez-Laing 14'; Madine (yellow card) 67'	Stadium: City Ground; Attendance: 28,209 (1,480 away); Referee: Robert Jones

6 December 2019 19	Millwall	2–2	Nottingham Forest	Bermondsey, London
19:45 GMT	Williams 15'; Thompson (yellow card) 32'; O'Brien 90'	Report	Cash (yellow card) 30'; Grabban 63' 88'; Silva (yellow card) 66'	Stadium: The Den; Attendance: 12,976 (1,267 away); Referee: John Brooks
Note: Live on Sky Sports

10 December 2019 20	Nottingham Forest	1–1	Middlesbrough	West Bridgford
19:45 GMT	Silva (yellow card) 27'; Yates 63'; Semedo (yellow card) 83'; Worrall (yellow card) 87'; Robinson (yellow card) 90'	Report	Spence (yellow card) 24'; McNair 81' (pen.); Fletcher (yellow card) 85'	Stadium: City Ground; Attendance: 24,577 (500 away); Referee: Andy Woolmer

14 December 2019 21	Nottingham Forest	0–4	Sheffield Wednesday	West Bridgford
15:00 GMT		Report	Rhodes 9' 13' 37'; Fletcher 45'	Stadium: City Ground; Attendance: 28,002 (1,993 away); Referee: James Linington

21 December 2019 22	Huddersfield Town	2–1	Nottingham Forest	Huddersfield
15:00 GMT	Schindler 32'; Mounié 49'; Chalobah (yellow card) 63'; Hogg (yellow card) 70'; Grabara (yellow card) 80'	Report	Sow (yellow card) 39'; Figueiredo (yellow card) 57'; Watson (yellow card) 66'; Worrall 75'	Stadium: John Smith’s Stadium; Attendance: 22,529 (2,400 away); Referee: Andy Davies

26 December 2019 23	Hull City	0–2	Nottingham Forest	Kingston upon Hull
15:00 GMT	Da Silva Lopes (yellow card) 73'; Kingsley (yellow card) 77'; Bowen (yellow card) 87'	Report	Chema (yellow card) 4'; Grabban 11' (pen.) 82'; Watson (yellow card) 87'	Stadium: KCOM Stadium; Attendance: 15,001 (2,013 away); Referee: Geoff Eltringham

29 December 2019 24	Nottingham Forest	1–0	Wigan Athletic	West Bridgford
15:00 GMT	Figueiredo 60'	Report	Byrne (yellow card) 57'; Kipré (yellow card) 71'; Naismith (yellow card) 81'	Stadium: City Ground; Attendance: 27,844 (480 away); Referee: Matthew Donohue

1 January 2020 25	Nottingham Forest	3–2	Blackburn Rovers	West Bridgford
15:00 GMT	Lolley 22'; Grabban 25' (pen.) 55'; Sow (yellow card) 45'	Report	Downing 39'; Worrall 71' (o.g.); Bell (yellow card) 90'	Stadium: City Ground; Attendance: 27,073 (883 away); Referee: Darren Bond

11 January 2020 26	Reading	1–1	Nottingham Forest	Reading
15:00 GMT	Swift (yellow card) 38'; Méïté (yellow card) 87'; Figueiredo 90+7' (o.g.)	Report	Silva (yellow card) 45'; Watson (yellow card) 90' (goal) 90+5'	Stadium: Madejski Stadium; Attendance: 16,602 (2,073 away); Referee: Dean Whitestone

19 January 2020 27	Nottingham Forest	3–1	Luton Town	West Bridgford
12:00 GMT	Lolley 36' 57'; Grabban 90' (pen.)	Report	Cornick 23'; Rea (yellow card) 35'; Tunnicliffe (yellow card) 88'; Potts (yellow card) 90'	Stadium: City Ground; Attendance: 27,081 (1,554 away); Referee: Tony Harrington
Note: Live on Sky Sports

22 January 2020 28	Nottingham Forest	1–1	Reading	West Bridgford
19:45 GMT	Ribeiro (yellow card) 65'; Grabban 80'	Report	Pelé (yellow card) 23'; Ejaria (yellow card) 72'; Baldock 83'	Stadium: City Ground; Attendance: 26,840 (808 away); Referee: David Webb

28 January 2020 29	Brentford	0–1	Nottingham Forest	Brentford, London
19:45 GMT	Benrahma (yellow card) 39'	Report	Lolley 14'; Samba (yellow card) 23'	Stadium: Griffin Park; Attendance: 12,274 (1,553 away); Referee: Tim Robinson

1 February 2020 30	Birmingham City	2–1	Nottingham Forest	Birmingham
15:00 GMT	Hogan 42'; Pedersen 74'; Šunjić (yellow card) 88'	Report	Silva 18'; Ribeiro (yellow card) 88'	Stadium: St Andrew's; Attendance: 20,837 (2,746 away); Referee: Jeremy Simpson

8 February 2020 31	Nottingham Forest	2–0	Leeds United	West Bridgford
17:30 GMT	Ameobi 31'; Cash (yellow card) 44'; Sow (yellow card) 83'; Diakhaby (yellow card) 90'; Walker 90'	Report	Dallas (yellow card) 35'; Alioski (yellow card) 55'; White (yellow card) 72'	Stadium: City Ground; Attendance: 29,455 (1,993 away); Referee: Oliver Langford
Note: Live on Sky Sports

11 February 2020 32	Nottingham Forest	0–1	Charlton Athletic	West Bridgford
19:45 GMT	Diakhaby (yellow card) 47' da Costa (yellow card) 86'	Report	Davis (yellow card) 21'; Taylor 24'; Cullen (yellow card) 66'; Smith (yellow card) 90'; Phillips (yellow card) 90'	Stadium: City Ground; Attendance: 28,029 (805 away); Referee: Darren Bond

15 February 2020 33	West Bromwich Albion	2–2	Nottingham Forest	West Bromwich
12:30 GMT	Robinson 37'; Figueiredo 65' (o.g.); Phillips (yellow card) 75'	Report	Cash (yellow card) 27' (goal) 90'; Sow (yellow card) 40'; Bartley 45' (o.g.); Samba (yellow card) 71'	Stadium: The Hawthorns; Attendance: 25,117 (1,977 away); Referee: Keith Stroud

22 February 2020 34	Nottingham Forest	0–0	Queens Park Rangers	West Bridgford
15:00 GMT	Diakhaby (yellow card) 54'	Report	Rangel (yellow card) 63'; Hugill (yellow card) 76'; Osayi-Samuel (yellow card) 90'	Stadium: City Ground; Attendance: 28,750 (1,459 away); Referee: Robert Jones

25 February 2020 35	Cardiff City	0–1	Nottingham Forest	Cardiff
19:45 GMT	Bacuna (yellow card) 82'	Report	Silva 50'; Ameobi (yellow card) 70'; Worrall (yellow card) 84'	Stadium: Cardiff City Stadium; Attendance: 21,273 (963 away); Referee: Stephen Martin

2 March 2020 36	Middlesbrough	2–2	Nottingham Forest	Middlesbrough
19:45 GMT	Gestede 40'; Wing 44'; Shotton (yellow card) 75'	Report	Yates 29'; Grabban 86'	Stadium: Riverside Stadium; Attendance: 18,884 (1,100 away); Referee: Darren England

6 March 2020 37	Nottingham Forest	0–3	Millwall	West Bridgford
19:45 GMT	Samba (yellow card) 80'	Report	Smith 20' 26' 33'; Cooper (yellow card) 87'	Stadium: City Ground; Attendance: 27,307 (936 away); Referee: Geoff Eltringham

20 June 2020 38	Sheffield Wednesday	1–1	Nottingham Forest	Sheffield
15:00 BST	Luongo (yellow card) 62'; Odubajo (yellow card) 70'; Wickham 90'; Iorfa (yellow card) 90'	Report	Worrall (yellow card) 68'; Lolley 69'; Cash (yellow card) 72'; Silva (yellow card) 78'	Stadium: Hillsborough; Attendance: 0 Referee: Robert Jones
Note: On 3 April, the English Football League decided to postpone all football until safe to do so due to the COVID-19 pandemic. The match was rescheduled to 20 June.

28 June 2020 39	Nottingham Forest	3–1	Huddersfield Town	West Bridgford
14:15 BST	Grabban 43' 46'; Watson (yellow card) 44'; Ameobi (yellow card) 62'; Yates 85'	Report	Bacuna (red card) 89'; Grant 90' (pen.)	Stadium: City Ground; Attendance: 0 Referee: David Webb
Note: On 3 April, the English Football League decided to postpone all football until safe to do so due to the COVID-19 pandemic. The match was rescheduled to 28 June.

1 July 2020 40	Nottingham Forest	1–0	Bristol City	West Bridgford
19:45 BST	Silva 63'	Report	Weimann (yellow card) 45'; Williams (red card) 78'; Vyner (yellow card) 84'	Stadium: City Ground; Attendance: 0 Referee: Darren Bond
Note: On 3 April, the English Football League decided to postpone all football until safe to do so due to the COVID-19 pandemic. The match was rescheduled to 1 July.

4 July 2020 41	Derby County	1–1	Nottingham Forest	Derby
15:00 BST	Sibley (yellow card) 80'; Waghorn (red card) 90'; Martin 90'	Report	Lolley 12'; Ameobi (yellow card) 90'; Ribeiro (yellow card) 90'; Worrall (yellow card) 90'	Stadium: Pride Park Stadium; Attendance: 0 Referee: Darren England
Note: On 3 April, the English Football League decided to postpone all football until safe to do so due to the COVID-19 pandemic. The match was rescheduled to 4 July.

7 July 2020 42	Nottingham Forest	0–1	Fulham	West Bridgford
17:00 BST	Ribeiro (yellow card) 83'; Cash (yellow card) 89'	Report	Onomah (yellow card) 43'; Arter 45'; Odoi (yellow card) 90'	Stadium: City Ground; Attendance: 0 Referee: Robert Jones
Note: On 3 April, the English Football League decided to postpone all football until safe to do so due to the COVID-19 pandemic. The match was rescheduled to 7 July.

11 July 2020 43	Preston North End	1–1	Nottingham Forest	Preston
15:00 BST	Stockley 15'; Bauer (yellow card) 16'; Hughes (yellow card) 49'	Report	Grabban 5' (pen.)	Stadium: Deepdale; Attendance: 0 Referee: Jeremy Simpson
Note: On 3 April, the English Football League decided to postpone all football until safe to do so due to the COVID-19 pandemic. The match was rescheduled to 11 July.

15 July 2020 44	Nottingham Forest	2–2	Swansea City	West Bridgford
18:00 BST	Ameobi 20', 55'; Sow (yellow card) 32'; Figueiredo (yellow card) 38'; Jenkinson (yellow card) 49'; Silva (yellow card) 84'	Report	Brewster 8'; Ayew 45' (pen.); Gallagher (yellow card) 45'; Naughton (red card) 82'; Byers (yellow card) 90'	Stadium: City Ground; Attendance: 0 Referee: Oliver Langford
Note: On 3 April, the English Football League decided to postpone all football until safe to do so due to the COVID-19 pandemic. The match was rescheduled to 15 July.

19 July 2020 45	Barnsley	1–0	Nottingham Forest	Barnsley
15:00 BST	Schmidt 90'	Report	Watson (yellow card) 51'	Stadium: Oakwell; Attendance: 0 Referee: Scott Duncan
Note: On 3 April, the English Football League decided to postpone all football until safe to do so due to the COVID-19 pandemic. The match was rescheduled to 19 July.

22 July 2020 46	Nottingham Forest	1–4	Stoke City	West Bridgford
19:00 BST	Figueiredo 61'	Report	Batth 19'; McClean 73'; Gregory 78'; Cousins (yellow card) 90'; Da Costa 90' (o.g.)	Stadium: City Ground; Attendance: 0 Referee: Gavin Ward
Note: On 3 April, the English Football League decided to postpone all football until safe to do so due to the COVID-19 pandemic. The match was rescheduled to 22 July.

=== FA Cup ===
5 January 2020 Third round	Chelsea	2–0	Nottingham Forest	Fulham, London
14:01 GMT	Hudson-Odoi 6'; Barkley 33'; James (yellow card) 65'	Report	Yates (yellow card) 77'	Stadium: Stamford Bridge; Attendance: 40,492; Referee: Peter Bankes

=== EFL Cup ===
13 August 2019 First round	Nottingham Forest	1–0	Fleetwood Town	West Bridgford
19:45 BST	Silva (yellow card) 44' (goal) 59'; Bostock (yellow card) 83'; Ribeiro (yellow card) 90'	Report	Morris (yellow card) 77'; McAleny (yellow card) 80'; Coyle (yellow card) 90'	Stadium: City Ground; Attendance: 7,432; Referee: Alan Young

27 August 2019 Second round	Nottingham Forest	3–0	Derby County	West Bridgford
19:45 BST	Adomah 25'; Lolley 35'; Carvalho 79'	Report	Buchanan (yellow card) 28'; Paterson (yellow card) 49'; Shinnie (yellow card) 79'	Stadium: City Ground; Attendance: 26,971; Referee: John Brooks

24 September 2019 Third round	Arsenal	5–0	Nottingham Forest	Holloway, London
20:00 BST	Martinelli 31' 90'; Nelson (yellow card) 56' (goal) 84'; Holding 71'; Willock 78'	Report	Robinson (yellow card) 90'	Stadium: Emirates Stadium; Attendance: 53,160; Referee: Darren England

== Goals and appearances ==
As of match played 22 July 2020 (Note: Players whose names are in italics spent time on loan at other clubs this season.) (Note: Players whose names appear in bold left Nottingham Forest on a permanent basis mid-season.)

No.	Pos	Nat	Player	Total		EFL Championship		FA Cup		EFL Cup	
No.	Pos	Nat	Player	Apps	Goals	Apps	Goals	Apps	Goals	Apps	Goals
1	GK	(Romania) ROU	Costel Pantilimon	0	0	0	0	0	0	0	0
2	DF	(Portugal) POR	Yuri Ribeiro	31	0	27	0	1	0	3	0
3	DF	(Portugal) POR	Tobias Figueiredo	34	3	30	3	1	0	3	0
4	DF	(England) ENG	Joe Worrall	48	1	46	1	0	0	2	0
6	DF	(Sweden) SWE	**Alexander Milošević**	0	0	0	0	0	0	0	0
6	DF	(Cameroon) CMR	Gaëtan Bong	1	0	1	0	0	0	0	0
7	FW	(England) ENG	Lewis Grabban	45	20	43+2	20	0	0	0	0
8	MF	(England) ENG	Ben Watson	45	3	45	3	0	0	0	0
9	FW	(Cape Verde) CPV	Nuno da Costa	10	0	4+6	0	0	0	0	0
10	MF	(Portugal) POR	João Carvalho	26	2	9+14	1	1	0	1+1	1
11	MF	(England) ENG	Matty Cash	45	3	40+2	3	0	0	2+1	0
12	GK	(England) ENG	Jordan Smith	3	0	2	0	1	0	0	0
13	MF	(England) ENG	John Bostock	9	0	1+6	0	0	0	2	0
14	FW	(Spain) ESP	Rafa Mir	13	0	2+9	0	0	0	2	0
14	FW	(France) FRA	Adama Diakhaby	14	0	2+12	0	0	0	0	0
15	GK	(England) ENG	Luke Steele	0	0	0	0	0	0	0	0
16	DF	(England) ENG	Carl Jenkinson	10	0	7+1	0	1	0	1	0
17	MF	(Guinea-Bissau) GBS	Alfa Semedo	26	2	10+14	2	1	0	1	0
18	DF	(England) ENG	**Jack Robinson**	19	0	16+2	0	0	0	1	0
19	MF	(England) ENG	Sammy Ameobi	47	5	37+8	5	0	0	1+1	0
20	DF	(England) ENG	Michael Dawson	19	1	16+2	1	1	0	0	0
21	MF	(Mali) MLI	Samba Sow	26	0	22+3	0	0	0	1	0
22	MF	(England) ENG	Ryan Yates	28	3	16+11	3	1	0	0	0
23	MF	(England) ENG	Joe Lolley	44	10	37+5	9	0	0	2	1
24	MF	(Argentina) ARG	**Claudio Yacob**	0	0	0	0	0	0	0	0
26	MF	(Scotland) SCO	Liam Bridcutt	0	0	0	0	0	0	0	0
27	DF	(Zimbabwe) ZIM	Tendayi Darikwa	0	0	0	0	0	0	0	0
28	MF	(Portugal) POR	Tiago Silva	47	4	34+10	3	0	0	2+1	1
29	DF	(Tunisia) TUN	Yohan Benalouane	2	0	0+1	0	0+1	0	0	0
30	GK	(Republic of the Congo) CGO	Brice Samba	42	0	40	0	0	0	2	0
34	FW	(England) ENG	Tyler Walker	7	1	1+6	1	0	0	0	0
36	DF	(Spain) ESP	**Chema**	10	0	7+1	0	0	0	1+1	0
37	MF	(Ghana) GHA	Albert Adomah	27	3	5+19	2	1	0	2	1
38	MF	(England) ENG	Tyrese Fornah	1	0	0	0	0+1	0	0	0
39	FW	(England) ENG	Zach Clough	0	0	0	0	0	0	0	0
40	MF	(Wales) WAL	Brennan Johnson	8	0	2+2	0	1	0	2+1	0
42	MF	(Ireland) EIR	Yassine En-Neyah	1	0	0	0	0+1	0	0	0
43	FW	(England) ENG	**Arvin Appiah**	1	0	0	0	0	0	1	0
44	DF	(Germany) GER	Michael Hefele	0	0	0	0	0	0	0	0
46	DF	(Scotland) SCO	Jordan Lawrence-Gabriel	1	0	0	0	0	0	0+1	0
48	FW	(England) ENG	Alex Mighten	10	0	0+8	0	1	0	0+1	0
49	GK	(Kosovo) KOS	Arijanet Muric	5	0	4	0	0	0	1	0

== Transfers ==
(Note: The summer transfer window was open from 6 May to 8 August 2019, however English clubs could sell players to members of other leagues where their window remained open.)

=== Transfers in ===
Date	Position	Nationality	Name	From	Fee	Team	Ref.
24 June 2019	MF	ENG	Sammy Ameobi	Bolton Wanderers	Free	First team	
5 July 2019	MF	POR	Tiago Silva	Feirense (POR)	Undisclosed	First team	
8 July 2019	DF	POR	Yuri Ribeiro	Benfica (POR)	Undisclosed	First team	
10 July 2019	MF	GHA	Albert Adomah	Aston Villa	Free	First team	
1 August 2019	MF	MLI	Samba Sow	Dynamo Moscow (RUS)	Undisclosed	First team	
7 August 2019	DF	ENG	Carl Jenkinson	Arsenal	Undisclosed	First team	
7 August 2019	GK	CGO	Brice Samba	Caen (FRA)	Undisclosed	First team	
8 August 2019	DF	ESP	Chema	Levante (ESP)	Undisclosed	First team	
28 October 2019	MF	ENG	Liam Sole	Milton Keynes Dons	Free	Under-23s	
29 January 2020	FW	CPV	Nuno da Costa	Strasbourg (FRA)	Undisclosed	First team	
30 January 2020	DF	CMR	Gaëtan Bong	Brighton and Hove Albion	Undisclosed	First team	
31 January 2020	FW	SWE	Julian Larsson	AIK (SWE)	Undisclosed	Under-23s	
6 February 2020	MF	USA	Adrian Galliani	Watford	Undisclosed	Under-23s	
17 February 2020	DF	WAL	Morgan Sadler	Bury	Free	Under-23s	
26 February 2020	MF	ENG	Marcus McGuane	Barcelona B (ESP)	Free	Under-23s	

=== Loans in ===
Date	Position	Nationality	Name	From	Loan ends	Team	Ref.
8 July 2019	MF	GNB	Alfa Semedo	Benfica (POR)	30 June 2020	First team	
9 July 2019	GK	KOS	Arijanet Muric	Manchester City	30 June 2020	First team	
30 July 2019	FW	ESP	Rafa Mir	Wolverhampton Wanderers	14 January 2020	First team	
8 August 2019	MF	ENG	John Bostock	Toulouse (FRA)	30 June 2020	First team	
8 August 2019	GK	GRE	Marios Siampanis	Olympiacos (GRE)	30 June 2020	Under-23s	
21 January 2020	FW	FRA	Adama Diakhaby	Huddersfield Town	30 June 2020	First team	

=== Transfers out ===
Date	Position	Nationality	Name	To	Fee	Team	Ref.
18 June 2019	FW	ALG	Hillal Soudani	Olympiacos (GRE)	Undisclosed	First team	
24 June 2019	FW	GRE	Apostolos Vellios	Atromitos (GRE)	Undisclosed	First team	
1 July 2019	GK	IRL	Liam Bossin	Cork City (IRL)	Released	Under-23s	
1 July 2019	DF	ENG	Joe Coveney	Colne	Released	Under-23s	
1 July 2019	DF	ENG	Adam Crookes	Port Vale	Released	Under-23s	
1 July 2019	DF	ENG	Sam Greenwood	Free agent	Released	Under-18s	
1 July 2019	DF	GER	Josef Hefele	Saint Leo University (USA)	Released	Under-23s	
1 July 2019	GK	IRL	Stephen Henderson	Crystal Palace	Released	First team	
1 July 2019	DF	SCO	Alex Iacovitti	Oldham Athletic	Released	Under-23s	
1 July 2019	GK	LVA	Rūdolfs Soloha	Valmiera Glass ViA (LVA)	Released	Under-23s	
1 July 2019	MF	GRE	Panagiotis Tachtsidis	Lecce (ITA)	£450,000	First team	
1 July 2019	MF	NIR	Jamie Ward	Scunthorpe United	Released	First team	
5 July 2019	MF	ENG	Jorge Grant	Lincoln City	Undisclosed	First team	
12 July 2019	FW	IRN	Karim Ansarifard	Al-Sailiya (QAT)	Undisclosed	First team	
26 July 2019	MF	ENG	Ben Osborn	Sheffield United	Undisclosed	First team	
18 August 2019	MF	ALG	Adlène Guedioura	Al-Gharafa (QAT)	Undisclosed	First team	
1 September 2019	MF	USA	Gboly Ariyibi	Panetolikos (GRE)	Undisclosed	First team	
2 September 2019	FW	ENG	Arvin Appiah	Almería (ESP)	£8,000,000	First team	
2 September 2019	FW	SCO	Jason Cummings	Shrewsbury Town	Undisclosed	First team	
2 September 2019	FW	IRE	Daryl Murphy	Bolton Wanderers	Free	First team	
28 October 2019	DF	SWE	Alexander Milošević	Vejle BK (DEN)	Released	First team	
21 January 2020	DF	ENG	Jack Robinson	Sheffield United	Undisclosed	First team	
27 January 2020	MF	ARG	Claudio Yacob	Nacional (URU)	Free	First team	
30 January 2020	DF	ESP	Chema	Getafe (ESP)	Undisclosed	First team	
20 June 2020	DF	ENG	Max Ram	Stratford Town	Released	Under-23s	

=== Loans out ===
Date	Position	Nationality	Name	To	Loan ends	Team	Ref.
2 August 2019	FW	ENG	Tyler Walker	Lincoln City	30 January 2020	First team	
8 August 2019	GK	ENG	Luke Steele	Millwall	20 January 2020	First team	
9 August 2019	FW	FRA	Virgil Gomis	Macclesfield Town	3 January 2020	Under-23s	
12 August 2019	MF	ENG	Toby Edser	Woking	15 November 2019	Under-23s	
16 August 2019	DF	ENG	Jayden Richardson	Exeter City	30 June 2020	Under-23s	
30 August 2019	MF	ENG	Jake Taylor	Port Vale	30 June 2020	Under-23s	
2 September 2019	MF	SCO	Liam Bridcutt	Bolton Wanderers	2 January 2020	First team	
30 October 2019	FW	ENG	Victor Sodeinde	Hereford	4 February 2020	Under-23s	
5 December 2019	DF	ENG	Danny Preston	Alfreton Town	4 January 2020	Under-23s	
20 December 2019	GK	ENG	Jordan Wright	Alfreton Town	19 January 2020	Under-23s	
4 January 2020	FW	ENG	Will Swan	Truro City	1 March 2020	Under-23s	
10 January 2020	MF	SCO	Owen Gallacher	Harrogate Town	9 February 2020	Under-23s	
24 January 2020	DF	ENG	Jordan Lawrence-Gabriel	Scunthorpe United	30 June 2020	Under-23s	
30 January 2020	GK	ROM	Costel Pantilimon	Omonia (CYP)	30 June 2020	First team	
31 January 2020	GK	ENG	Luke Steele	Millwall	30 June 2020	First team	
31 January 2020	MF	ENG	Tyrese Fornah	Casa Pia (POR)	30 June 2020	Under-23s	
31 January 2020	MF	SCO	Liam Bridcutt	Lincoln City	30 June 2020	First team	
31 January 2020	MF	GHA	Albert Adomah	Cardiff City	30 June 2020	First team	
3 March 2020	GK	ENG	George Shelvey	Truro City	31 March 2020	Under-23s	
3 March 2020	FW	PHI	Kieran Hayes	Truro City	31 March 2020	Under-23s	

== Awards ==
=== League ===
==== Sky Bet Championship Manager of the Month ====
Result	Month	Manager	Ref
Won	September	FRA Sabri Lamouchi	
Won	January	FRA Sabri Lamouchi	

==== Sky Bet Championship Player of the Month ====
Result	Month	Player	Ref
Nominated	January	ENG Joe Lolley	

==== PFA Bristol Street Motors Fan's Championship Player of the Month ====
Result	Month	Player	Ref
Won	November	CGO Brice Samba	
Nominated	November	ENG Matty Cash	
