= 2018–19 Nottingham Forest F.C. season =

English football club season

Nottingham Forest
2018–19 season
- Owner: Evangelos Marinakis; Sokratis Kominakis
- Chairman: Nicholas Randall QC
- Manager: Aitor Karanka (until 11 January); Martin O'Neill (from 15 January to 28 June)
- Stadium: City Ground
- Championship: 9th
- FA Cup: Third round (eliminated by Chelsea)
- EFL Cup: Fourth round (eliminated by Burton Albion)
- Top goalscorer: Lewis Grabban (17)
- Highest home attendance: 29,530 (vs. Leeds United, EFL Championship, 1 January)
- Lowest home attendance: 8,172 (vs. Bury, EFL Cup, 14 August)
- Average home league attendance: 28,143
- Biggest win: 3–0 (vs. Bolton Wanderers, EFL Championship, 24 October)
- Biggest defeat: 0–3 (vs. Sheffield Wednesday, EFL Championship, 9 April)
Home colours	Away colours

The 2018–19 season was Nottingham Forest's 153rd season in existence and 11th consecutive season in the EFL Championship. In addition to the Championship, the club participated in the FA Cup and EFL Cup. The season covered the period between 1 July 2018 and 30 June 2019.

== First team squad ==
As of 7 February 2019

No.	Player	Nationality	Date of birth (age)	Signed from	Year signed	Signed until
Goalkeepers
1	Costel Pantilimon	ROU	1 February 1987 (aged 32)	Watford	2018	2021
15	Luke Steele	ENG	24 September 1984 (aged 34)	Bristol City	2018	2020
41	Stephen Henderson	IRL	2 May 1988 (aged 31)	Charlton Athletic	2016	2019
Defenders
3	Tobias Figueiredo	POR	2 February 1994 (aged 25)	Sporting CP	2018	2022
13	Molla Wagué	MLI	21 February 1991 (aged 28)	Udinese	2019	2019
17	Alexander Milošević	SWE	21 February 1991 (aged 28)	AIK	2019	2020
18	Jack Robinson	ENG	1 September 1993 (aged 25)	Queens Park Rangers	2018	2020
20	Michael Dawson	ENG	18 November 1983 (aged 35)	Hull City	2018	2020
21	Saidy Janko	SUI	22 October 1995 (aged 23)	Porto	2018	2019
25	Sam Byram	ENG	16 September 1993 (aged 25)	West Ham United	2018	2019
27	Tendayi Darikwa	ZIM	13 December 1991 (aged 27)	Burnley	2017	2021
29	Yohan Benalouane	TUN	28 March 1987 (aged 32)	Leicester City	2019	2020
44	Michael Hefele	GER	30 January 1992 (aged 27)	Huddersfield Town	2018	2021
Midfielders
5	Adlène Guedioura	ALG	12 November 1985 (aged 33)	Middlesbrough	2018	2020
6	Jack Colback	ENG	24 October 1989 (aged 29)	Newcastle United	2018	2019
8	Ben Watson	ENG	9 July 1985 (aged 33)	Watford	2018	2020
10	João Carvalho	POR	9 March 1997 (aged 22)	Benfica	2018	2023
11	Ben Osborn	ENG	5 August 1994 (aged 24)	Academy	2012	2020
14	Matty Cash	ENG	7 August 1997 (aged 21)	Academy	2016	2021
19	Diogo Gonçalves	POR	6 February 1997 (aged 22)	Benfica	2018	2019
22	Ryan Yates	ENG	21 November 1997 (aged 21)	Academy	2016	2021
23	Joe Lolley	ENG	25 August 1992 (aged 26)	Huddersfield Town	2018	2023
24	Claudio Yacob	ARG	18 July 1987 (aged 31)	West Bromwich Albion	2018	2020
26	Liam Bridcutt	SCO	8 May 1989 (aged 30)	Leeds United	2017	2020
28	Pelé	GNB	29 September 1991 (aged 27)	Monaco	2019	2019
35	Jamie Ward	NIR	12 May 1986 (aged 33)	Derby County	2015	2019
Forwards
2	Hillal Soudani	ALG	25 November 1987 (aged 31)	Dinamo Zagreb	2018	2021
7	Lewis Grabban	ENG	12 January 1988 (aged 31)	Bournemouth	2018	2022
9	Daryl Murphy	IRL	15 March 1983 (aged 36)	Newcastle United	2017	2020
33	Léo Bonatini	BRA	28 March 1994 (aged 25)	Wolverhampton Wanderers	2019	2019
37	Karim Ansarifard	IRN	3 April 1990 (aged 29)	Olympiacos	2018	2020
43	Arvin Appiah	ENG	5 January 2001 (aged 18)	Academy	2018	2023

== Pre-season friendlies ==
11 July 2018 Friendly	Nottingham Forest	5–0	Lincoln Red Imps	Marbella, Spain
18:00 CEST	Cash 24'; Gabriel 34'; Gomis 60'; Lolley 64'; Yates 65'	Report		Stadium: Marbella Football Centre

14 July 2018 Friendly	Real Betis	1–0	Nottingham Forest	Algeciras, Spain
20:00 CEST	Boudebouz 83'	Report		Stadium: Estadio Nuevo Mirador

16 July 2018 Friendly	Málaga	0–3	Nottingham Forest	Marbella, Spain
11:00 CEST		Report	34' Dias; 63' Osborn; 65' Soudani	Stadium: Marbella Football Centre

21 July 2018 Friendly	Oldham Athletic	2–2	Nottingham Forest	Oldham
15:00 BST	Trialist 49'; Edmundson 58'	Report	3' Cash; 87' Grabban	Stadium: Boundary Park; Attendance: 1,768

25 July 2018 Friendly	Scunthorpe United	0–1	Nottingham Forest	Scunthorpe
19:30 BST		Report	24' Yates	Stadium: Glanford Park; Attendance: 2,509

28 July 2018 Friendly	Nottingham Forest	2–0	Bournemouth	West Bridgford
15:00 BST	Darikwa 36'; Dias 48'	Report		Stadium: City Ground; Attendance: 14,108

== Competitions ==
=== Championship ===
==== League table ====
Pos	Team	Pld	W	D	L	GF	GA	GD	Pts	Promotion, qualification or relegation
6	Derby County	46	20	14	12	69	54	+15	74	Qualification for Championship play-offs (Note: Four teams play for one spot and promotion to the Premier League.)
7	Middlesbrough	46	20	13	13	49	41	+8	73	
8	Bristol City	46	19	13	14	59	53	+6	70	
9	Nottingham Forest	46	17	15	14	61	54	+7	66	
10	Swansea City	46	18	11	17	65	62	+3	65	
11	Brentford	46	17	13	16	73	59	+14	64 (Note: Brentford were awarded a 1–0 win over Bolton due to Bolton's inability to hold the fixture.)	
12	Sheffield Wednesday	46	16	16	14	60	62	−2	64	

Source: Sky Sports Archived 25 September 2019 at the Wayback Machine
Rules for classification: 1) Points; 2) Goal difference; 3) Number of goals scored; 4) Head-to-head results

==== Results summary ====
Overall								Home						Away					
Pld	W	D	L	GF	GA	GD	Pts	W	D	L	GF	GA	GD	W	D	L	GF	GA	GD
46	17	15	14	61	54	+7	66	13	4	6	34	21	+13	4	11	8	27	33	−6

Last updated: 5 May 2019.
Source: BBC

==== Results by matchday ====
Matchday	1	2	3	4	5	6	7	8	9	10	11	12	13	14	15	16	17	18	19	20	21	22	23	24	25	26	27	28	29	30	31	32	33	34	35	36	37	38	39	40	41	42	43	44	45	46
Ground	A	H	H	A	H	A	A	H	H	A	H	A	H	A	A	H	H	A	A	H	H	A	H	A	A	H	A	H	H	A	H	A	A	H	A	H	H	A	H	A	A	H	A	H	A	H
Result	D	D	W	D	D	L	D	W	W	D	D	W	L	W	D	W	D	W	D	W	L	D	L	D	L	W	L	L	W	L	W	D	D	W	L	W	L	D	W	L	L	L	L	W	W	W
Position	16	10	5	7	13	14	15	11	9	11	11	5	9	7	7	6	7	7	6	5	7	7	7	10	10	7	9	11	9	12	9	9	8	8	9	8	10	11	9	9	10	11	13	11	10	9

Updated to match(es) played on 5 May 2019. Source: Statto.com
A = Away; H = Home; W = Win; D = Draw; L = Loss

==== Matches ====
4 August 2018 1	Bristol City	1–1	Nottingham Forest	Bristol
15:00 BST	Weimann 5'	Report	46' Murphy; (yellow card) 50' Guedioura; (yellow card) 60' Dias; (yellow card) 81' Carvalho; (yellow card) 90' Watson	Stadium: Ashton Gate Stadium; Attendance: 22,395 (2,692 away); Referee: Darren Bond

7 August 2018 2	Nottingham Forest	1–1	West Bromwich Albion	West Bridgford
19:45 BST	Colback (yellow card) 54'; Guedioura 59'	Report	(yellow card) 38' Bartley; 87' Phillips	Stadium: The City Ground; Attendance: 27,850 (1,957 away); Referee: Darren England

11 August 2018 3	Nottingham Forest	1–0	Reading	West Bridgford
15:00 BST	Soudani 68'	Report	(yellow card) 81' Barrow	Stadium: The City Ground; Attendance: 27,948 (826 away); Referee: Stephen Martin

18 August 2018 4	Wigan Athletic	2–2	Nottingham Forest	Wigan
15:00 BST	Powell 2'; Grigg 30' (pen.); Vaughan (yellow card) 87'; Morsy (yellow card) 88'	Report	10' Cash; (yellow card) 29' Osborn; (yellow card) 69' Colback; (yellow card) 87' Fox; (yellow card) 88' Watson; 90' Soudani	Stadium: DW Stadium; Attendance: 11,543 (2,513 away); Referee: Geoff Eltringham

25 August 2018 5	Nottingham Forest	2–2	Birmingham City	West Bridgford
17:30 BST	Figueiredo (yellow card) 32'; Fox (yellow card) 41'; Murphy (yellow card) 45' (goal) 87'; Lolley 75'; Colback (yellow card) 84'	Report	21' Jutkiewicz; 72' Adams	Stadium: The City Ground; Attendance: 26,799 (1,965 away); Referee: Tim Robinson

1 September 2018 6	Brentford	2–1	Nottingham Forest	Brentford, London
15:00 BST	Konsa (yellow card) 18'; Macleod (yellow card) 35' (goal) 45'; Barbet (yellow card) 35'; Watkins 84'; Sawyers (yellow card) 90'; Benrahma (yellow card) 90'	Report	(yellow card) 31' Lolley; (yellow card) 35' Hefele; (yellow card) 54' Osborn; (yellow card) 55' Fox; 62' Cash; (yellow card) 74' Watson; (yellow card) 90' Robinson; (yellow card) 90' Grabban	Stadium: Griffin Park; Attendance: 10,186 (1,654 away); Referee: Peter Bankes

15 September 2018 7	Swansea City	0–0	Nottingham Forest	Swansea
15:00 BST		Report	(yellow card) 41' Cash; (yellow card) 44' Janko; (yellow card) 52' Lolley	Stadium: Liberty Stadium; Attendance: Scott Duncan; Referee: 19,522 (1,716 away)

19 September 2018 8	Nottingham Forest	2–1	Sheffield Wednesday	West Bridgford
19:45 BST	Grabban 41' (yellow card) 45'; Carvalho 63'; Robinson (yellow card) 78'	Report	88' Fletcher	Stadium: The City Ground; Attendance: 26,252 (1,995 away); Referee: Tony Harrington

22 September 2018 9	Nottingham Forest	1–0	Rotherham United	West Bridgford
15:00 BST	Guedioura (yellow card) 32'; Grabban 86' (pen.)	Report	(yellow card) 33' Jones; (yellow card) 86' Towell; (yellow card) 90' Vaulks	Stadium: The City Ground; Attendance: 27,479 (1,291 away); Referee: Robert Jones

29 September 2018 10	Blackburn Rovers	2–2	Nottingham Forest	Blackburn
15:00 BST	Armstrong 65'; Dack 74'	Report	(yellow card) 44' Colback; 52' 80' (pen.) Grabban	Stadium: Ewood Park; Attendance: 14,440 (2,022 away); Referee: Andrew Madley

3 October 2018 11	Nottingham Forest	2–2	Millwall	West Bridgford
19:45 BST	Lolley 27'; Robinson (yellow card) 65'; Carvalho 70'	Report	(yellow card) 51' Ferguson; (yellow card) 69' Leonard; 75' Williams; 90' Gregory	Stadium: The City Ground; Attendance: 25,753 (387 away); Referee: Jonathan Moss

6 October 2018 12	Middlesbrough	0–2	Nottingham Forest	Middlesbrough
15:00 BST	Shotton (yellow card) 38'; Ayala (yellow card) 43'		(yellow card) 25' (goal) 50' Lolley; (yellow card) 54' (yellow-red card) 80' Robinson; 78' Grabban	Stadium: Riverside Stadium; Attendance: 24,299 (1,409 away); Referee: John Brooks

20 October 2018 13	Nottingham Forest	1–2	Norwich City	West Bridgford
15:00 BST	Grabban 5'; Carvalho (yellow card) 45'; Pantilimon (yellow card) 50'; Watson (yellow card) 71'	Report	(yellow card) 45' Zimmermann; 60' 84' Klose; (yellow card) 90' Rhodes; (yellow card) 90' Cantwell	Stadium: The City Ground; Attendance: 29,427 (1,993 away); Referee: Keith Stroud

24 October 2018 14	Bolton Wanderers	0–3	Nottingham Forest	Horwich
20:00 BST	Lowe (yellow card) 16'	Report	12' Lolley; (yellow card) 38' Figueiredo; 64' 83' (pen.) Grabban; (yellow card) 66' Carvalho	Stadium: The University of Bolton Stadium; Attendance: 13,195 (1,001 away); Referee: Andy Davies

27 October 2018 15	Leeds United	1–1	Nottingham Forest	Leeds
17:30 BST	Phillips (yellow card) 63'; Roofe 82'	Report	11' Robinson; (yellow card) 61' Grabban; (yellow card) 68' Colback; (yellow card) 88' Carvalho; (yellow card) 89' Dias	Stadium: Elland Road Stadium; Attendance: 34,308 (1,766 away); Referee: Geoff Eltringham

3 November 2018 16	Nottingham Forest	1–0	Sheffield United	West Bridgford
15:00 GMT	Cash (yellow card) 34'; Grabban 69'; Figueiredo (yellow card) 71'; Robinson (yellow card) 90'	Report	(yellow card) 88' Egan	Stadium: The City Ground; Attendance: 28,757 (1,976 away); Referee: Scott Duncan

10 November 2018 17	Nottingham Forest	0–0	Stoke City	West Bridgford
15:00 GMT	Dawson (yellow card) 68'	Report		Stadium: The City Ground; Attendance: 28,556 (2,000 away); Referee: Oliver Langford

24 November 2018 18	Hull City	0–2	Nottingham Forest	Kingston upon Hull
15:00 GMT	Irvine (yellow card) 37'; Campbell (yellow card) 90'	Report	61' Grabban; 64' Lolley	Stadium: KCOM Stadium; Attendance: 13,364 (2,424 away); Referee: Graham Scott

28 November 2018 19	Aston Villa	5–5	Nottingham Forest	Birmingham
19:45 GMT	Abraham 11' 14' 36' (pen.) 71'; Bolasie (yellow card) 19'; Hutton (yellow card) 71'; El Ghazi 75' (yellow card) 87'	Report	3' 82' Grabban; 6' Carvalho; 22' Cash; 51' Lolley; (yellow card) 65' Yacob; (red card) 68' Figueiredo; (yellow card) 71' Darikwa; (yellow card) 78' Colback	Stadium: Villa Park; Attendance: 32,368 (2,484 away); Referee: Simon Hooper

1 December 2018 20	Nottingham Forest	2–0	Ipswich Town	West Bridgford
15:00 GMT	Grabban 10' 38'; Hefele (yellow card) 54'; Pantilimon (yellow card) 82'	Report	(yellow card) 45' Skuse	Stadium: The City Ground; Attendance: 27,873 (1,493 away); Referee: James Linington

8 December 2018 21	Nottingham Forest	0–1	Preston North End	West Bridgford
15:00 GMT	Yacob (yellow card) 86'	Report	56' Moult; (yellow card) 74' Davies	Stadium: The City Ground; Attendance: 27,777 (1,247 away); Referee: Stephen Martin

17 December 2018 22	Derby County	0–0	Nottingham Forest	Derby
19:45 GMT	Bryson (yellow card) 25'; Bogle (yellow card) 45'; Huddlestone (yellow card) 68'	Report	(yellow card) 33' Hefele; (yellow card) 55' Osborn; (yellow card) 87' Colback	Stadium: Pride Park Stadium; Attendance: 31,160 (3,109 away); Referee: Keith Stroud

22 December 2018 23	Nottingham Forest	0–1	Queens Park Rangers	West Bridgford
15:00 GMT	Carvalho (yellow card) 43'; Ansarifard (yellow card) 58'; Robinson (yellow card) 78'	Report	45' Leistner; (yellow card) 65' Luongo	Stadium: The City Ground; Attendance: 28,177 (1,414 away); Referee: Gavin Ward

26 December 2018 24	Norwich City	3–3	Nottingham Forest	Norwich
15:00 GMT	Stiepermann (yellow card) 27'; Godfrey (yellow card) 37'; Pukki (yellow card) 55'; Vrančić 77' (yellow card) 80'; Hernández 90' 90'	Report	45' 74' Cash; (yellow card) 49' Fox; (yellow card) 52' (goal) 65' Robinson	Stadium: Carrow Road; Attendance: 26,933 (1,586 away); Referee: John Brooks

29 December 2018 25	Millwall	1–0	Nottingham Forest	Bermondsey, London
15:00 GMT	Tunnicliffe 9'; Leonard (yellow card) 14'; Karacan (yellow card) 90'	Report	(yellow card) 31' Yacob; (yellow card) 82' Robinson	Stadium: The Den; Attendance: 15,273 (2,220 away); Referee: Tony Harrington

1 January 2019 26	Nottingham Forest	4–2	Leeds United	West Bridgford
15:00 GMT	Colback 5' 69'; Robinson (yellow card) 14'; Murphy 72'; Osborn 77'; Darikwa (yellow card) 81'	Report	(red card) 42' Phillips; 53' Clarke; 64' Alioski	Stadium: The City Ground; Attendance: 29,530 (2,000 away); Referee: Darren England

12 January 2019 27	Reading	2–0	Nottingham Forest	Reading
15:00 GMT	Swift 23'; Richards (yellow card) 32'; Moore (yellow card) 62'; Yiadom (yellow card) 62'; Robinson 87' (o.g.)	Report	(yellow card) 8' (yellow-red card) 63' Fox; (yellow card) 38' Colback; (yellow card) 61' Murphy; (yellow card) 62' Robinson; (red card) 83' Darikwa	Stadium: Madejski Stadium; Attendance: 15,034 (2,093 away); Referee: Oliver Langford

19 January 2019 28	Nottingham Forest	0–1	Bristol City	West Bridgford
15:00 GMT	Benalouane (yellow card) 45'; Janko (yellow card) 88'	Report	70' Diédhiou	Stadium: The City Ground; Attendance: 28,922 (1,570 away); Referee: Jeremy Simpson

26 January 2019 29	Nottingham Forest	3–1	Wigan Athletic	West Bridgford
15:00 GMT	Lolley 19'; Watson (yellow card) 27'; Cash (yellow card) 30' (goal) 48'; Benalouane (yellow card) 41'; Guedioura 80'; Colback (yellow card) 90'	Report	33' Windass; (yellow card) 58' Morsy; (yellow card) 70' Byrne	Stadium: The City Ground; Attendance: 28,848 (1,436 away); Referee: Jeremy Simpson

2 February 2019 30	Birmingham City	2–0	Nottingham Forest	Birmingham
15:00 GMT	Jota 13'; Kieftenbeld (yellow card) 79'; Adams 90' (pen.); Morrison (yellow card) 90'	Report	(yellow card) 22' Lolley; (yellow card) 54' (red card) 90' Benalouane	Stadium: St Andrew's Trillion Trophy Stadium; Attendance: 24,235 (3,074 away); Referee: David Webb

9 February 2019 31	Nottingham Forest	2–1	Brentford	West Bridgford
15:00 GMT	Grabban 16'; Yates (yellow card) 62'; Wagué 79'	Report	(yellow card) 58' Odubajo; 89' Canós	Stadium: The City Ground; Attendance: 27,829 (1,182 away); Referee: Robert Jones

12 February 2019 32	West Bromwich Albion	2–2	Nottingham Forest	West Bromwich
20:00 GMT	Livermore (yellow card) 40'; Murphy 54'; Rodriguez 89' (pen.)	Report	6' (o.g.) Johansen; (yellow card) 16' Watson; 65' Yates; (yellow card) 73' Milošević	Stadium: The Hawthorns; Attendance: 22,691 (2,205 away); Referee: Lee Mason

16 February 2019 33	Preston North End	0–0	Nottingham Forest	Preston
15:00 GMT	Stockley (yellow card) 83'	Report		Stadium: Deepdale; Attendance: 13,904 (1,913 away); Referee: Tim Robinson

25 February 2019 34	Nottingham Forest	1–0	Derby County	West Bridgford
19:45 GMT	Benalouane 2'; Yates (yellow card) 29'; Colback (yellow card) 82'	Report	(yellow card) 26' Wilson; (yellow card) 29' Holmes; (yellow card) 90' Tomori	Stadium: The City Ground; Attendance: 29,421 (1,990 away); Referee: Robert Jones

2 March 2019 35	Stoke City	2–0	Nottingham Forest	Stoke-on-Trent
15:00 GMT	Etebo 15'; Afobe 74'; McClean (yellow card) 87'; Adam (yellow card) 90'	Report	(yellow card) 61' Robinson; (yellow card) 85' Benalouane	Stadium: bet365 Stadium; Attendance: 26,736 (2,900 away); Referee: Roger East

9 March 2019 36	Nottingham Forest	3–0	Hull City	West Bridgford
15:00 GMT	Yates (yellow card) 45'; Ansarifard (yellow card) 67' (goal) 76'; Carvalho 72'; Lolley 82' (pen.)	Report	(yellow card) 58' Irvine	Stadium: The City Ground; Attendance: 29,397 (1,963 away); Referee: James Linington

13 March 2019 37	Nottingham Forest	1–3	Aston Villa	West Bridgford
19:45 GMT	Colback 3' (yellow card) 86'; Ansarifard (yellow card) 29'; Milošević (yellow card) 61'	Report	7' 15' McGinn; (yellow card) 27' (goal) 61' Hause; (yellow card) 65' Taylor; (yellow card) 90' Kodjia	Stadium: The City Ground; Attendance: 29,224 (2,002 away); Referee: Mike Dean

16 March 2019 38	Ipswich Town	1–1	Nottingham Forest	Ipswich
15:00 GMT	Quaner 5'	Report	31' Wagué; (yellow card) 83' Colback	Stadium: Portman Road; Attendance: 16,709 (1,691 away); Referee: Keith Stroud

30 March 2019 39	Nottingham Forest	2–1	Swansea City	West Bridgford
15:00 GMT	Lolley (yellow card) 24'; Colback (yellow card) 59'; Darikwa (yellow card) 69'; Murphy 80'; Wagué 87'; Benalouane (yellow card) 89'	Report	(yellow card) 40' McBurnie; 76' Roberts	Stadium: The City Ground; Attendance: 28,469 (1,021 away); Referee: Jeremy Simpson

6 April 2019 40	Rotherham United	2–1	Nottingham Forest	Rotherham
15:00 GMT	Smith 10'; Ihiekwe 60'	Report	28' Grabban; (yellow card) 42' Janko	Stadium: AESSEAL New York Stadium; Attendance: 11,012 (1,291 away); Referee: Steve Martin

9 April 2019 41	Sheffield Wednesday	3–0	Nottingham Forest	Sheffield
19:45 BST	Hector (yellow card) 18'; Matias 47' (yellow card) 57' (goal) 67'; Boyd 58'	Report	(yellow card) 44' Byram; (yellow card) 64' Benalouane	Stadium: Hillsborough Stadium; Attendance: 23,931 (1,964 away); Referee: Lee Mason

13 April 2019 42	Nottingham Forest	1–2	Blackburn Rovers	West Bridgford
15:00 BST	Bennett 52' (o.g.); Yates (yellow card) 56'; Byram (yellow card) 74'	Report	29' Rothwell; 49' Graham; (yellow card) 68' Bennett; (yellow card) 68' Evans; (yellow card) 82' Williams	Stadium: The City Ground; Attendance: 27,786 (1,100 away); Referee: Darren Bond

19 April 2019 43	Sheffield United	2–0	Nottingham Forest	Sheffield
12:30 BST	Cranie (yellow card) 45'; Duffy 51'; Baldock (yellow card) 77'; Stevens 85'; Norwood (yellow card) 86'	Report	(yellow card) 18' Colback; (yellow card) 43' Byram; (red card) 47' Benalouane	Stadium: Brammall Lane; Attendance: 28,403 (2,217 away); Referee: Andrew Madley

22 April 2019 44	Nottingham Forest	3–0	Middlesbrough	West Bridgford
15:00 BST	Lolley 39' (pen.) 85'; Cash (yellow card) 45'; Milošević 65'	Report	(yellow card) 38' Shotton	Stadium: The City Ground; Attendance: 27,653 (1,449 away); Referee: Peter Bankes

27 April 2019 45	Queens Park Rangers	0–1	Nottingham Forest	Shepherd's Bush, London
15:00 BST	Manning (yellow card) 90'	Report	(yellow card) 39' Yates; 55' Ansarifard; (yellow card) 90' Robinson	Stadium: Loftus Road Stadium; Attendance: 15,212 (2,367 away); Referee: Scott Duncan

5 May 2019 46	Nottingham Forest	1–0	Bolton Wanderers	West Bridgford
12:30 BST	Lolley 28'	Report		Stadium: The City Ground; Attendance: 27,578 (578 away); Referee: Oliver Langford

=== FA Cup ===
5 January 2019 Third round	Chelsea	2–0	Nottingham Forest	Fulham, London
15:00 GMT	Barkley (yellow card) 41'; Morata 49' 59'	Report	(yellow card) 67' Colback	Stadium: Stamford Bridge; Attendance: 40,554; Referee: Andrew Madley

=== EFL Cup ===
14 August 2018 First round	Nottingham Forest	1–1 (10–9 p)	Bury	West Bridgford
19:30 BST	Smith (red card) 32'; Cash (yellow card) 53' (goal) 90'; Byram (yellow card) 63'	Report	2' (yellow card) 39' O'Connell; (yellow card) 31' Telford; (yellow card) 82' Murphy; (yellow card) 84' Moore	Stadium: The City Ground; Attendance: 8,172; Referee: Scott Duncan

29 August 2018 Second round	Nottingham Forest	3–1	Newcastle United	West Bridgford
19:45 BST	Murphy 2'; Dias (yellow card) 68' (goal) 90'; Hefele (yellow card) 76'; Robinson (yellow card) 83'; Cash 90'	Report	(yellow card) 76' Joselu; (yellow card) 80' Longstaff; 90' Rondón; (yellow card) 90' Pérez	Stadium: The City Ground; Attendance: 13,942; Referee: Jeremy Simpson

26 September 2018 Third round	Nottingham Forest	3–2	Stoke City	West Bridgford
19:45 BST	Osborn 19'; Murphy 40'; Lolley 50' (yellow card) 63'; Gonçalves (red card) 77'; Fox (yellow card) 90'	Report	(yellow card) 53' Crouch; 60' Afobe; (yellow card) 65' Adam; 83' Berahino	Stadium: The City Ground; Attendance: 12,915; Referee: Darren England

30 October 2018 Fourth round	Burton Albion	3–2	Nottingham Forest	Burton upon Trent
19:45 GMT	Fraser 52' 64'; Hesketh 82'	Report	(yellow card) 47' Dawson; 70' Grabban; 90' Appiah	Stadium: Pirelli Stadium; Attendance: 4,284; Referee: John Brooks

== Goals and appearances ==
As of match played 5 May 2019 (Note: Players whose names are in italics spent time on loan at other clubs this season.) (Note: Players whose names appear emboldened left Nottingham Forest on a permanent basis after making a competitive appearance for the club this season.)

No.	Pos	Nat	Player	Total		EFL Championship		Emirates FA Cup		EFL Cup	
No.	Pos	Nat	Player	Apps	Goals	Apps	Goals	Apps	Goals	Apps	Goals
1	GK	(Romania) ROU	Costel Pantilimon	44	0	44	0	0	0	0	0
2	FW	(Algeria) ALG	Hillal Soudani	8	2	1+5	2	0	0	2	0
3	DF	(Portugal) POR	Tobias Figueiredo	14	0	11+2	0	0	0	1	0
4	DF	(Scotland) SCO	Danny Fox	21	0	18	0	1	0	1+1	0
5	MF	(Algeria) ALG	Adlène Guedioura	28	2	18+9	2	1	0	0	0
6	MF	(England) ENG	Jack Colback	39	3	38	3	1	0	0	0
7	FW	(England) ENG	Lewis Grabban	41	17	29+10	16	0	0	0+2	1
8	MF	(England) ENG	Ben Watson	21	0	14+3	0	0	0	4	0
9	FW	(Republic of Ireland) IRL	Daryl Murphy	32	6	17+11	4	1	0	3	2
10	MF	(Portugal) POR	João Carvalho	40	4	28+10	4	1	0	1	0
11	MF	(England) ENG	Ben Osborn	44	2	29+10	1	1	0	2+2	1
12	GK	(England) ENG	Jordan Smith	1	0	0	0	0	0	1	0
13	DF	(Mali) MLI	Molla Wagué	11	3	9+2	3	0	0	0	0
14	MF	(England) ENG	Matty Cash	41	8	27+9	6	1	0	2+2	2
15	GK	(England) ENG	Luke Steele	7	0	2	0	1	0	3+1	0
17	DF	(Sweden) SWE	Alexander Milošević	12	1	11+1	1	0	0	0	0
18	DF	(England) ENG	Jack Robinson	40	2	36+2	2	0	0	2	0
19	MF	(Portugal) POR	Diogo Gonçalves	10	0	1+6	0	0	0	3	0
20	DF	(England) ENG	Michael Dawson	13	0	8+2	0	0	0	3	0
21	DF	(Switzerland) SUI	Saidy Janko	17	0	13+2	0	1	0	1	0
22	MF	(England) ENG	Ryan Yates	17	1	15+1	1	0	0	1	0
23	MF	(England) ENG	Joe Lolley	51	12	42+4	11	0+1	0	2+2	1
24	MF	(Argentina) ARG	Claudio Yacob	17	0	11+5	0	1	0	0	0
25	DF	(England) ENG	Sam Byram	8	0	6	0	0	0	2	0
26	MF	(Scotland) SCO	Liam Bridcutt	4	0	0+1	0	0	0	3	0
27	DF	(Zimbabwe) ZIM	Tendayi Darikwa	31	0	28	0	1	0	1+1	0
28	MF	(Guinea-Bissau) GBS	Pelé	9	0	6+3	0	0	0	0	0
29	DF	(Tunisia) TUN	Yohan Benalouane	14	1	14	1	0	0	0	0
31	FW	(Portugal) POR	Gil Dias	24	1	10+11	0	0	0	3	1
33	FW	(Brazil) BRA	Léo Bonatini	5	0	2+3	0	0	0	0	0
34	MF	(Greece) GRE	Panagiotis Tachtsidis	0	0	0	0	0	0	0	0
35	MF	(Northern Ireland) NIR	Jamie Ward	0	0	0	0	0	0	0	0
37	FW	(Iran) IRI	Karim Ansarifard	12	2	3+9	2	0	0	0	0
38	MF	(United States) USA	Gboly Ariyibi	0	0	0	0	0	0	0	0
39	FW	(Greece) GRE	Apostolos Vellios	0	0	0	0	0	0	0	0
40	FW	(England) ENG	Zach Clough	0	0	0	0	0	0	0	0
41	GK	(Republic of Ireland) IRL	Stephen Henderson	0	0	0	0	0	0	0	0
42	DF	(England) ENG	Joe Worrall	0	0	0	0	0	0	0	0
43	FW	(England) ENG	Arvin Appiah	7	1	2+4	0	0	0	0+1	1
44	DF	(Germany) GER	Michael Hefele	18	0	13+2	0	0	0	3	0
—	FW	(Scotland) SCO	Jason Cummings	0	0	0	0	0	0	0	0
—	MF	(England) ENG	Jorge Grant	0	0	0	0	0	0	0	0
—	FW	(England) ENG	Tyler Walker	0	0	0	0	0	0	0	0

== Transfers ==
(Note: The summer 2018 transfer window was open for domestic transfers (i.e. Premier League, English Football League) from 17 May 2018 and for international transfers from 8 June 2018.)

=== Transfers in ===
Date	Position	Nationality	Name	From	Fee	Ref.
1 July 2018	MF	POR	João Carvalho	Benfica	£13,200,000	
1 July 2018	DF	ENG	Michael Dawson	Hull City	Free	
1 July 2018	DF	POR	Tobias Figueiredo	Sporting	Undisclosed	
1 July 2018	DF	ENG	Jack Robinson	Queens Park Rangers	Free	
1 July 2018	FW	ALG	Hillal Soudani	Dinamo Zagreb	Undisclosed	
3 July 2018	GK	ROM	Costel Pantilimon	Watford	Undisclosed	
6 July 2018	FW	ENG	Lewis Grabban	Bournemouth	Undisclosed	
1 August 2018	GK	ENG	Luke Steele	Bristol City	Free	
9 August 2018	DF	GER	Michael Hefele	Huddersfield Town	Undisclosed	
5 September 2018	MF	GRE	Panagiotis Tachtsidis	Olympiacos	Free	
6 September 2018	MF	ARG	Claudio Yacob	West Bromwich Albion	Free	
3 November 2018	FW	IRN	Karim Ansarifard	Olympiacos	Free	
18 January 2019	DF	TUN	Yohan Benalouane	Leicester City	Undisclosed	
1 February 2019	DF	SWE	Alexander Milošević	AIK	Free	

=== Transfers out ===
Date	Position	Nationality	Name	To	Fee	Ref.
22 June 2018	DF	USA	Eric Lichaj	Hull City	Undisclosed	
1 July 2018	DF	ENG	Choz Charlesworth	Grantham Town	Released	
1 July 2018	MF	ENG	Chris Cohen	Retired	—N/a	
1 July 2018	MF	IRN	Ashkan Dejagah	Tractor Sazi	Released	
1 July 2018	DF	ENG	Jack Hobbs	Bolton Wanderers	Released	
1 July 2018	FW	ENG	Luke McCormick	Grantham Town	Released	
1 July 2018	MF	ENG	Elvis Otim	Barnsley	Released	
1 July 2018	MF	ENG	Aaron Smith	Hamilton Academical	Released	
1 July 2018	MF	ENG	Connor Smith	Free Agent	Released	
1 July 2018	MF	WAL	David Vaughan	Notts County	Released	
1 July 2018	FW	ENG	Lewis Walters	Guiseley	Released	
1 July 2018	DF	ENG	Jake Willetts	Eckerd Tritons	Released	
4 July 2018	MF	GRE	Andreas Bouchalakis	Olympiacos	Undisclosed	
11 July 2018	DF	ENG	Matthew Bondswell	RB Leipzig	Undisclosed	
20 July 2018	DF	SEN	Armand Traoré	Çaykur Rizespor	Undisclosed	
31 July 2018	MF	SCO	Barrie McKay	Swansea City	Undisclosed	
1 August 2018	GK	GRE	Stefanos Kapino	Werder Bremen	Undisclosed	
3 August 2018	DF	ENG	Michael Mancienne	New England Revolution	Free	
29 August 2018	DF	FIN	Thomas Lam	PEC Zwolle	Undisclosed	
31 August 2018	GK	BUL	Dimitar Evtimov	Burton Albion	Contract Terminated	
4 January 2019	FW	ENG	Ben Brereton	Blackburn Rovers	Undisclosed	
24 January 2019	GK	SWE	Tim Erlandsson	IK Frej	Undisclosed	
28 January 2019	DF	SWE	Anel Ahmedhodžić	Malmö FF	Undisclosed	
29 January 2019	DF	SCO	Danny Fox	Wigan Athletic	Undisclosed	

=== Loans in ===
Date	Position	Nationality	Name	From	Ends	Ref.
23 June 2018	MF	POR	Gil Dias	Monaco	24 January 2019	
1 July 2018	MF	POR	Diogo Gonçalves	Benfica	30 June 2019	
20 July 2018	MF	ENG	Jack Colback	Newcastle United	30 June 2019	
10 August 2018	DF	ENG	Sam Byram	West Ham United	30 June 2019	
31 August 2018	DF	SUI	Saidy Janko	Porto	30 June 2019	
4 September 2018	DF	DEU	Josef Hefele	Bradford City	4 December 2018	
31 January 2019	FW	BRA	Léo Bonatini	Wolverhampton Wanderers	30 June 2019	
31 January 2019	MF	GNB	Pelé	Monaco	30 June 2019	
1 February 2019	DF	MLI	Molla Wagué	Udinese	30 June 2019	

=== Loans out ===
Date	Position	Nationality	Name	To	Ends	Ref.
29 June 2018	FW	ENG	Tyler Walker	Mansfield Town	30 June 2019	
6 July 2018	MF	ENG	Jorge Grant	Luton Town	10 January 2019	
13 July 2018	FW	SCO	Jason Cummings	Peterborough United	31 January 2019	
2 August 2018	DF	ENG	Adam Crookes	Lincoln City	14 January 2019	
28 August 2018	FW	ENG	Ben Brereton	Blackburn Rovers	31 December 2018	
31 August 2018	FW	ENG	Zach Clough	Rochdale	31 December 2018	
31 August 2018	FW	GRE	Apostolos Vellios	Waasland-Beveren	30 June 2019	
31 August 2018	MF	NIR	Jamie Ward	Charlton Athletic	31 December 2018	
31 August 2018	DF	ENG	Joe Worrall	Rangers	30 June 2019	
28 September 2018	GK	LAT	Rudolfs Soloha	Coalville Town	26 October 2018	
19 October 2018	DF	ENG	Joe Coveney	Billericay Town	17 November 2018	
19 October 2018	DF	ENG	Ethan Stewart	Billericay Town	17 November 2018	
19 October 2018	MF	ENG	Toby Edser	Woking	18 January 2019	
30 October 2018	FW	FRA	Virgil Gomis	Braintree Town	24 November 2018	
2 November 2018	FW	ENG	Victor Sodeinde	Mickleover Sports	30 November 2018	
16 November 2018	GK	ENG	Jordan Smith	Barnsley	23 November 2018	
17 November 2018	GK	ENG	Jordan Wright	Grantham Town	30 June 2019	
4 December 2018	GK	IRL	Stephen Henderson	Wycombe Wanderers	27 December 2018	
3 January 2019	MF	GRE	Panagiotis Tachtsidis	Lecce	30 June 2019	
7 January 2019	MF	USA	Gboly Ariyibi	Motherwell	30 June 2019	
10 January 2019	GK	ENG	Jordan Smith	Mansfield Town	30 June 2019	
14 January 2019	DF	ENG	Adam Crookes	Port Vale	30 June 2019	
14 January 2019	MF	ENG	Jorge Grant	Mansfield Town	30 June 2019	
28 January 2019	DF	SCO	Alex Iacovitti	Oldham Athletic	30 June 2019	
31 January 2019	FW	ENG	Zach Clough	Rochdale	30 June 2019	
31 January 2019	FW	SCO	Jason Cummings	Luton Town	30 June 2019	
31 January 2019	MF	ENG	Toby Edser	Port Vale	30 June 2019	
31 January 2019	FW	FRA	Virgil Gomis	Notts County	30 June 2019	

== New contracts ==
Date	Position	Nationality	Player	Length	Expires	Ref.
5 July 2018	MF	ENG	Ryan Yates	Three years	2021	
23 January 2019	FW	ENG	Arvin Appiah	Four and a half years	2023	
7 February 2019	MF	ENG	Joe Lolley	Four and a half years	2023	

== Awards ==
=== Club ===
Nottingham Forest Player of the Season

Result	Nationality	Player	Reference
Won	ENG	Joe Lolley	
Runner-up	ENG	Jack Colback	

Nottingham Forest Goal of the Season

Result	Nationality	Player	Reference
Won	ENG	Joe Lolley	
Runner-up	ENG	Ben Osborn	

=== League ===
EFL Championship Player of the Month

Month	Result	Player	Reference
October	Nominated	Joe Lolley	
November	Nominated	Joe Lolley	

Sky Bet Championship Goal of the Month

Month	Result	Player	Reference
November	Nominated	Joe Lolley	

=== Cups ===
EFL Cup Player of the Round

Round	Result	Player	Reference
2	Won	Gil Dias	

=== Other ===
PFA Player of the Month

Month	Result	Player	Reference
October	Won	Joe Lolley	
November	Nominated	Joe Lolley	
