= Lewis Grabban =

English footballer (born 1988)

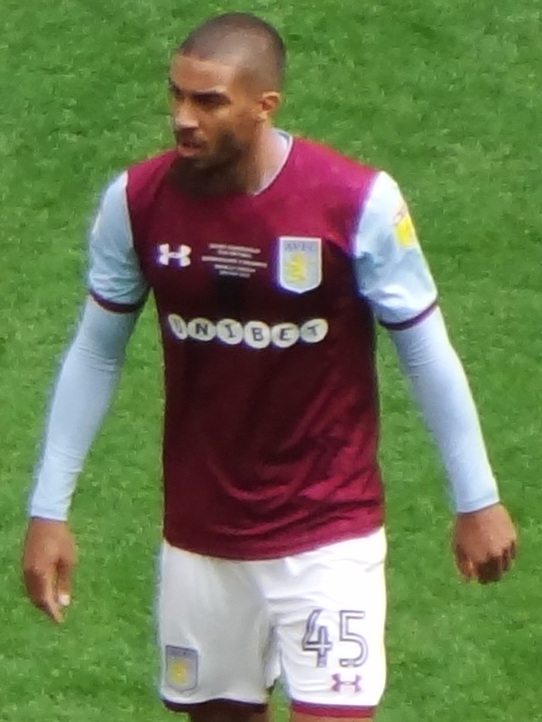
- Grabban with Aston Villa in 2018

Personal information
- Full name: Lewis James Grabban
- Date of birth: 12 January 1988 (age 38)
- Place of birth: Croydon, England
- Height: 6 ft 0 in (1.83 m)
- Position: Striker

Youth career
- 2004–2005: Crystal Palace

Senior career*
| Years | Team | Apps | (Gls) |
| 2005–2008 | Crystal Palace | 10 | (1) |
| 2006 | → Oldham Athletic (loan) | 9 | (0) |
| 2007–2008 | → Motherwell (loan) | 5 | (0) |
| 2008–2011 | Millwall | 56 | (9) |
| 2010 | → Brentford (loan) | 7 | (2) |
| 2010 | → Brentford (loan) | 4 | (1) |
| 2011 | Brentford | 18 | (4) |
| 2011–2012 | Rotherham United | 43 | (18) |
| 2012–2014 | AFC Bournemouth | 87 | (35) |
| 2014–2016 | Norwich City | 41 | (13) |
| 2016–2018 | AFC Bournemouth | 18 | (0) |
| 2017 | → Reading (loan) | 16 | (3) |
| 2017–2018 | → Sunderland (loan) | 19 | (12) |
| 2018 | → Aston Villa (loan) | 15 | (8) |
| 2018–2022 | Nottingham Forest | 144 | (54) |
| 2022 | Al-Ahli | 5 | (1) |
| Total | | 497 | (161) |
- * Club domestic league appearances and goals

Lewis James Grabban (born 12 January 1988) is an English former professional footballer who played as a striker. Since retiring from football Lewis has returned to Nottingham Forest as an academy coach.

He was called up to the Jamaica squad in 2015 but remained uncapped.

== Early and personal life ==
Grabban's maternal grandparents were Windrush migrants from Jamaica. He converted to Islam at the age of 18.

== Club career ==
=== Crystal Palace ===
After joining Crystal Palace at the age of 13, he was handed his debut in a 3–0 home win against Walsall in the League Cup on 23 August 2005. He made his second appearance in the following round, coming on as a late substitute in a 1–0 win against Coventry City on 20 September. In May 2006, he was named 'Academy Player of the Year'.

On 16 August 2006, he joined Oldham Athletic on an initial one-month loan deal. He made his debut on 19 August in a 1–0 loss against future club Millwall. The loan deal was extended a day before it was due to expire on 15 September, keeping Grabban at Oldham for another month. After making 10 appearances for the club, he was recalled by Crystal Palace on 10 October 2006.

He returned to Crystal Palace and made his league debut on 20 February 2007, in a 1–0 away win against Southend United. On 14 March 2007, he scored his first professional goal in a 3–2 win against West Brom.

On 31 August 2007, he joined Scottish side Motherwell on loan until January 2008. He made his debut on 3 September in a 2–0 defeat to Hearts. His loan ended on 2 January and he returned to Crystal Palace, playing in a 3–0 win against Wolves 10 days later. A week later he played in his final game before joining Millwall, a 2–0 win against Bristol City at Selhurst Park.

=== Millwall ===
On 21 January 2008, Grabban signed for Palace's London rivals Millwall for £150,000 on a three-and-a-half-year contract, and he was assigned the shirt number 10. He made his debut on 23 January in a 2–2 draw against Nottingham Forest at The Den. He scored his first goal for Millwall on 23 February in a 3–0 home win against Port Vale. He then scored in the following two games, scoring an equaliser to earn Millwall a 1–1 draw away to Luton Town, and opening the scoring in the first minute of a 2–1 win against Swansea City.

On the opening day of the 2008–09 season, Grabban scored in a 4–3 defeat to Oldham Athletic. His goal at the time had given Millwall a 3–1 lead, however Oldham sensationally managed to come back and win the game 4–3. On 30 August, he scored in a 2–1 win against Huddersfield Town, and scored again the following game which was a 2–0 win against Hartlepool United.

He began to find form as he scored four goals in nine matches, all of which were wins, against Swindon Town, Colchester United, Hereford United and Chester. Millwall finished fifth in the table, and after defeating Leeds United in the play-off semi-finals, they lost 3–2 to Scunthorpe United in the final at Wembley. Millwall and Grabban did gain promotion via the playoffs during the 2009–10 season after winning the 2010 Football League One play-off final against Swindon Town.

=== Brentford ===
On 25 March 2010, Grabban signed for Brentford on loan until the end of the season. On 27 March he made his debut and scored as Brentford beat Leyton Orient 1–0 at Griffin Park. His next and final goal of the loan spell came in a 3–0 home victory against Huddersfield Town on 10 April. He scored twice in 7 appearances before being recalled by parent club Millwall on 21 April. Brentford manager Andy Scott said: "He's done really well for us and we are very disappointed to lose him". The following season, he re-joined Brentford on loan for one month on 8 October 2010. He made his second debut the following day, in a 3–1 home defeat to Oldham Athletic. He scored his first goal in a 1–1 draw against AFC Bournemouth on 2 November, scoring a penalty just eight minutes after coming on as a substitute. The following day his loan spell was extended for another two months, keeping him at the club until 4 January. On 24 January 2011, Grabban signed permanently for Brentford on a free transfer, with his contract lasting until the end of the season. After scoring in games against MK Dons and Walsall, he scored twice in a 4–4 draw with Huddersfield Town on 7 May 2011, which was also his last appearances for the club. Grabban made 32 appearances and scored 7 goals across his three spells with the Bees.

=== Rotherham United ===
On 4 July 2011, Grabban signed for League Two side Rotherham United, on a two-year deal. He had previously worked with manager Andy Scott during his time at Brentford.

He made his debut on 6 August, and scored a stunning volley with the outside of his foot from the edge of the box, as Rotherham beat Oxford United 1–0 at Don Valley Stadium. He scored his second goal for the club on 27 August in a 3–0 home win against Gillingham, taking Rotherham to the top of the league in the process. On 10 September he scored twice as Rotherham beat Dagenham & Redbridge 3–1. A week later he scored twice in one game again, in a 3–3 draw with Torquay United. In October he scored in back to back games in the space of three days, in draws to Shrewsbury and Morecambe. In November, he scored in three consecutive wins, including two league wins against Aldershot and Bradford City, and twice in an FA Cup win against Barrow. He scored his third FA Cup goal of the season on 3 December, however Rotherham were eliminated as they lost 2–1 to Shrewsbury.

He scored his first goals of 2012 on 2 January, as Rotherham beat Bradford 3–0 at home. On 5 January Crawley Town bid £100,000 for Grabban, who had scored 12 goals in 24 appearances so far for Rotherham. The bid was rejected, and Rotherham manager Andy Scott labelled the bid as "embarrassing", saying it would take big money for them to accept any offers.

On 6 March he scored in a 1–1 draw with Crewe, and scored again the following game as Rotherham beat Plymouth Argyle 1–0. He followed this up with a goal in a 2–1 loss to Oxford on 17 March, and scoring the winner on 31 March against Hereford United. On 21 April he scored his 20th & 21st goals of the season in a 3–2 home win against Morecambe. On 21 May 2012 reports came in that Crawley Town had agreed a deal with the striker, it was later confirmed that Grabban had agreed a deal after announced by Sky Sports News and BBC Sport but Rotherham boss Steve Evans denied the deal being agreed.

=== AFC Bournemouth ===
On 31 May 2012, Grabban signed for League One team AFC Bournemouth for a fee believed to be around £300,000. He made his debut on 14 August 2012, in a 0–0 draw against Oxford United in the League Cup. Oxford won the game on penalties, although Grabban scored his penalty in the shoot-out. He made his league debut four days later, in a 1–1 draw against Portsmouth. He scored on his home debut on 21 August, opening the scoring in a 1–1 draw against MK Dons. On 13 October, he scored his second goal for the club in a 2–0 win at home to Leyton Orient. On 27 October, he scored again in a 4–2 win against Carlisle United. On 17 November, he scored a hat-trick in a 4–1 win against Oldham Athletic.

He scored twice on the opening day of the new season, now in the Championship after Bournemouth won promotion in the previous season, in a 2–1 win against Charlton Athletic. He then scored in the following game, a 6–1 defeat to Watford. He also scored again in the following game, a 1–0 win against Wigan Athletic, meaning he had scored four goals in the opening three matches. After scoring in defeats to Blackpool and Leeds United, Grabban scored in a 5–2 win against Millwall on 5 October, maintaining his excellent start to the season. Grabban then scored in consecutive away wins for Bournemouth against Reading and Sheffield Wednesday in December.

On 18 January 2014, Grabban signed a new three-and-a-half-year deal to end speculation with him to a move to Brighton & Hove Albion. Later that day, he celebrated signing his new deal by scoring in a 1–1 draw against Watford. Later in January, he scored in a 2–1 win against Huddersfield Town, and began February well by scoring in a 2–2 draw against Bolton Wanderers. In March, he took his tally for the season to 15 by scoring in back-to-back wins against Blackpool and Blackburn Rovers. Later that month, he ended a three-game goal drought by scoring twice in a 4–1 win against Leeds United. The win was also the first time that Bournemouth had ever beaten Leeds. Grabban scored 35 goals during his two-year stay with the Cherries.

=== Norwich City ===
On 5 June 2014, Grabban completed a transfer to Norwich City for an undisclosed fee which was reported to be around £3million. After making his debut in a 1–0 loss to Wolves in the opening game of the season, Grabban scored his first goal for the club in his second appearance, helping Norwich to beat Watford 3–0 at Carrow Road. On 23 August, Grabban scored the game's only goal as Norwich beat rivals Ipswich Town in the East Anglian derby, his fourth goal in his first four games for the club. He went on to score 13 goals in 44 games for the club, the first 12 of which played an integral part in the club gaining promotion to the Premier League.

In August 2015, Grabban was suspended by Norwich after he did not report for their League Cup fixture against Rotherham United, despite being named as a substitute for the match. It emerged that Grabban had fled Norwich's team hotel without permission from the club, with former club Bournemouth having made several bids to sign him. Grabban later apologised to Norwich supporters following the incident, reaffirming his commitment to the club.

=== Return to AFC Bournemouth ===
On 11 January 2016, Grabban re-signed for now Premier League side AFC Bournemouth from Norwich City on a three-and-a-half-year deal for an undisclosed fee.

Grabban struggled to make an impact for Bournemouth on returning to the club, failing to score in 16 appearances in the second half of the 2015–16 season.

Grabban fell out of favour at Bournemouth in the 2016–17 season, making only six appearances for the club without scoring.

==== Reading (loan) ====
On 31 January 2017, Grabban signed for Championship side Reading on loan for the remainder of the 2016–17 season.

Grabban scored three goals in 17 appearances for Reading throughout his loan spell, and he featured in their Championship play-off final defeat to Huddersfield Town.

==== Sunderland (loan) ====
On 26 July 2017, Grabban signed for Sunderland on a season long loan. He scored his first goal for Sunderland on his debut in a 1–1 draw with Derby County on 4 August 2017. The following weekend Grabban scored two goals and an own goal in a 3–1 victory over his former club Norwich.

Grabban's impressive form for a struggling Sunderland side saw him request to be recalled to parent club Bournemouth, and they activated this option on 5 January 2018, with Grabban returning as Sunderland's top scorer for the season with 12 goals in 20 games throughout his loan spell.

==== Aston Villa (loan) ====
Grabban joined Championship side Aston Villa on 31 January 2018, on loan until the end of the 2017–18 season. His first goal for the club was an equalising penalty against Preston North End on 20 February 2018.

During his loan spell he scored 8 goals in 15 games, to help Villa secure a play-off place and defeat Middlesbrough in the two semi finals to reach the final, playing in the final, as Villa lost 1–0 to Fulham in the final and thus missed out on promotion to the Premier League.

Grabban also finished the runner up to Sky Bet Championship Golden Boot winner Matěj Vydra after scoring 20 goals in the competition (for both Aston Villa and Sunderland combined) during the 2017–18 season.

=== Nottingham Forest ===
==== 2018–19 season ====
Grabban then joined Championship side Nottingham Forest for an undisclosed fee (believed to be £6 million) on 6 July 2018 on a four-year deal. Manager Aitor Karanka revealed that it took two to three weeks of persuasion before Grabban chose to move to Forest, but eventually he was convinced of the club's ambition. He started slowly at Forest, going six games without scoring, but then scored 15 in 15 games in all competitions, the first of which being in a 2–1 win over Sheffield Wednesday. Grabban then did not score in his next five games and picked up a few niggling injuries, before Karanka was sacked and replaced with Forest club legend Martin O'Neill. Under O'Neill's management and subsequent style of play, Grabban struggled with form, scoring just twice in 14 games, with the forward having to drop deep into his own half to get the ball due to Forest relying more on scoring from set-pieces than goals from open play. In total, Grabban scored 17 goals in 41 games for Forest in the 2018–19 season, 16 of which came in the Championship. This made him Forest's top scorer in an individual league season for the decade commencing 2010, beating Britt Assombalonga's total of 15 in the 2014–15 season.

==== 2019–20 season ====
On 28 June, Forest made the decision to sack Martin O'Neill and replace him with former France international Sabri Lamouchi, which offered Grabban a reprieve as Lamouchi chose to put his faith in Grabban as a lone striker. This paid off with Grabban once again finishing as Forest's top scorer, becoming the first Forest striker to score 20 goals in a single season since David Johnson and Marlon Harewood both achieved that feat during the 2002–03 season. He received particular praise for the increase in his work rate, with Lamouchi saying "Lewis is so crucial for us. If he is running like that, fighting like that and working hard for the team ... we can achieve anything".

==== 2020–21 season ====
Grabban was made vice-captain of Nottingham Forest ahead of the new season, following the departure of Ben Watson to Charlton Athletic. Grabban was offered the chance to move to Qatar and join former manager Sabri Lamouchi's new team, Al-Duhail. Grabban turned down the move after the Forest hierarchy convinced him of his worth to the team.

The 2020–21 season proved to be a much more difficult one for Grabban than his previous years at Forest. He scored no goals in the first seven games of the season before an injury kept him sidelined until December. Although he did manage to score on his return in a 2–0 victory over Sheffield Wednesday, he struggled to get a consistent run of games in the Forest team due to competition with strikers Lyle Taylor and Glenn Murray. He was Forest's top scorer for the third season in a row, scoring 6 goals.

==== 2021–22 season ====
Grabban inherited the Captain's armband for Forest ahead of the 2021–22 season, following Michael Dawson's retirement. The season started slowly for Grabban as he failed to score in the first five matches of the campaign.

The season started to look up for Forest and Grabban after the arrival of Steve Cooper as head coach. Grabban was considered the main striker under the new coach and started to score consistently as Forest climbed the table. By January, Grabban had doubled his tally of the previous season, including a goal against local rivals Derby County in the East Midland's Derby, his second against Forest's rivals in his time at the club.

Grabban finished the season with 13 goals in 34 appearances, with an ankle injury keeping him out of the side for much of the second half of the campaign. During that time, he was given credit for acting as a mentor to Keinan Davis and helping the loanee to improve his movement and positioning. As club captain, Grabban lifted the play-off trophy alongside Joe Worrall as Forest were promoted to the Premier League for the first time in 23 years. Grabban's Forest contract ran out on 30 June and his time at the club came to an end when it was announced he had turned down the offer of a new one.

=== Al-Ahli ===
On 24 August 2022, Grabban joined Saudi First Division League side Al-Ahli on a one-year deal. However within three months of signing Grabban, Al-Ahli terminated his contract in November 2022 after Grabban formally requested he be paid his wages for the two months that they had not been received. On 8 March 2023 Al-Ahli was ordered by the FIFA Football Tribunal to pay Grabban $500,000 in due wages on top of $700,000 in compensation for breach of contract.

== International career ==
Although born in London, Grabban is eligible to play for Jamaica in addition to England. In May 2014, it was reported on TV Jamaica that he was called up by German coach Winfried Schäfer to play against Serbia on 26 May 2014 in an international friendly. However the player was not named in the squad due to passport issues. Grabban was later called up to the Jamaica national football team on 27 February 2015 for friendly games against Venezuela and Cuba.

== Coaching career ==
On 7 August 2024, Nottingham Forest FC announced that Grabban had returned to the club, working as a Professional Development Phase coach with the U18 team with time also spent with the B team.

== Career statistics ==
As of 23 April 2022

Appearances and goals by club, season and competition
| Club | Season | League | | | National cup | | League cup | | Other | | Total | |
| Club | Season | Division | Apps | Goals | Apps | Goals | Apps | Goals | Apps | Goals | Apps | Goals |
|---|---|---|---|---|---|---|---|---|---|---|---|---|
| Crystal Palace | 2005–06 | Championship | 0 | 0 | 0 | 0 | 2 | 0 | 0 | 0 | 2 | 0 |
| Crystal Palace | 2006–07 | Championship | 8 | 1 | 0 | 0 | 0 | 0 | — | | 8 | 1 |
| Crystal Palace | 2007–08 | Championship | 2 | 0 | 0 | 0 | 1 | 0 | 0 | 0 | 3 | 0 |
| Crystal Palace | Total | | 10 | 1 | 0 | 0 | 3 | 0 | 0 | 0 | 13 | 1 |
| Oldham Athletic (loan) | 2006–07 | League One | 9 | 0 | 0 | 0 | 1 | 0 | 0 | 0 | 10 | 0 |
| Motherwell (loan) | 2007–08 | Scottish Premier League | 5 | 0 | 0 | 0 | 1 | 0 | — | | 6 | 0 |
| Millwall | 2007–08 | League One | 13 | 3 | 1 | 0 | 0 | 0 | 0 | 0 | 14 | 3 |
| Millwall | 2008–09 | League One | 31 | 6 | 5 | 1 | 1 | 0 | 2 (Note: Appearances in League One play-offs) | 0 | 39 | 7 |
| Millwall | 2009–10 | League One | 11 | 0 | 4 | 1 | 1 | 0 | 0 | 0 | 16 | 1 |
| Millwall | 2010–11 | Championship | 1 | 0 | 0 | 0 | 0 | 0 | — | | 1 | 0 |
| Millwall | Total | | 56 | 9 | 10 | 2 | 2 | 0 | 2 | 0 | 70 | 11 |
| Brentford (loan) | 2009–10 | League One | 7 | 2 | 0 | 0 | 0 | 0 | 0 | 0 | 7 | 2 |
| Brentford (loan) | 2010–11 | League One | 4 | 1 | 0 | 0 | 1 | 0 | 0 | 0 | 5 | 1 |
| Brentford (loan) | Total | | 11 | 3 | 0 | 0 | 1 | 0 | 0 | 0 | 12 | 3 |
| Brentford | 2010–11 | League One | 18 | 4 | 0 | 0 | 0 | 0 | 2 (Note: Appearance(s) in Football League Trophy) | 0 | 20 | 4 |
| Rotherham United | 2011–12 | League Two | 43 | 18 | 2 | 3 | 1 | 0 | 1 | 0 | 47 | 21 |
| AFC Bournemouth | 2012–13 | League One | 42 | 13 | 3 | 0 | 1 | 0 | 1 | 0 | 47 | 13 |
| AFC Bournemouth | 2013–14 | Championship | 44 | 22 | 2 | 0 | 0 | 0 | — | | 46 | 22 |
| AFC Bournemouth | Total | | 86 | 35 | 5 | 0 | 1 | 0 | 1 | 0 | 93 | 35 |
| Norwich City | 2014–15 | Championship | 35 | 12 | 0 | 0 | 0 | 0 | 1 (Note: Appearance(s) in Championship play-offs) | 0 | 36 | 12 |
| Norwich City | 2015–16 | Premier League | 6 | 1 | 0 | 0 | 2 | 0 | — | | 8 | 1 |
| Norwich City | Total | | 41 | 13 | 0 | 0 | 2 | 0 | 1 | 0 | 44 | 13 |
| AFC Bournemouth | 2015–16 | Premier League | 15 | 0 | 1 | 0 | 0 | 0 | — | | 16 | 0 |
| AFC Bournemouth | 2016–17 | Premier League | 3 | 0 | 1 | 0 | 2 | 1 | — | | 6 | 1 |
| AFC Bournemouth | Total | | 18 | 0 | 2 | 0 | 2 | 1 | — | | 22 | 1 |
| Reading (loan) | 2016–17 | Championship | 16 | 3 | 0 | 0 | 0 | 0 | 3 | 0 | 19 | 3 |
| Sunderland (loan) | 2017–18 | Championship | 19 | 12 | 0 | 0 | 1 | 0 | 0 | 0 | 20 | 12 |
| Aston Villa (loan) | 2017–18 | Championship | 15 | 8 | — | | — | | 3 | 0 | 18 | 8 |
| Nottingham Forest | 2018–19 | Championship | 39 | 16 | 0 | 0 | 2 | 1 | — | | 41 | 17 |
| Nottingham Forest | 2019–20 | Championship | 45 | 20 | 0 | 0 | 0 | 0 | — | | 45 | 20 |
| Nottingham Forest | 2020–21 | Championship | 28 | 6 | 0 | 0 | 1 | 0 | — | | 29 | 6 |
| Nottingham Forest | 2021–22 | Championship | 32 | 12 | 1 | 1 | 1 | 0 | — | | 34 | 13 |
| Nottingham Forest | Total | | 144 | 54 | 1 | 1 | 4 | 1 | — | | 149 | 56 |
| Career total | | | 491 | 160 | 20 | 6 | 19 | 2 | 12 | 0 | 540 | 168 |

== Honours ==
Brentford

- Football League Trophy runner-up: 2010–11

Norwich City

- Football League Championship play-offs: 2015

Individual

- PFA Fans' Player of the Year: 2011–12 League Two
- AFC Bournemouth Player of the Year: 2013–14
