= Samba Sow (footballer, born 1989) =

Malian footballer

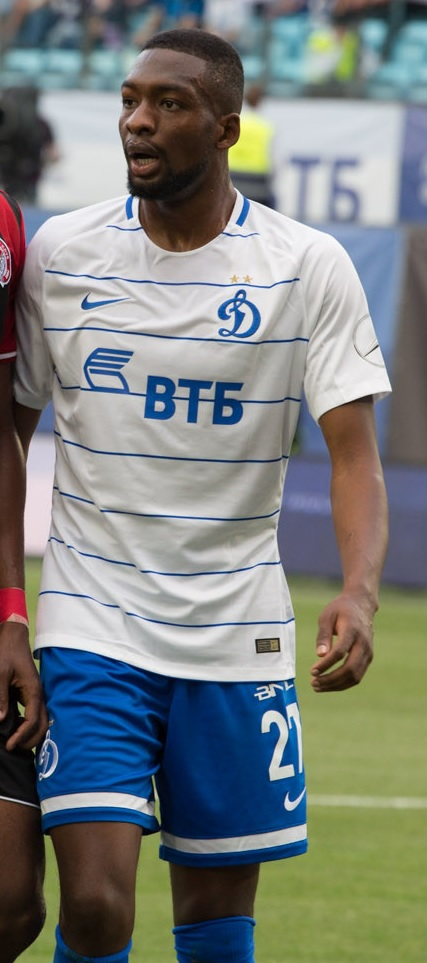
- Sow with Dynamo Moscow in 2017

Personal information
- Date of birth: 29 April 1989 (age 37)
- Place of birth: Bamako, Mali
- Height: 1.85 m (6 ft 1 in)
- Position: Defensive midfielder

Youth career
- 2006–2008: Lens

Senior career*
Years	Team	Apps	(Gls)
2008–2013	Lens	90	(1)
2011–2012	Lens B	6	(0)
2013–2015	Kardemir Karabükspor	50	(1)
2015–2017	Kayserispor	41	(3)
2017–2019	Dynamo Moscow	41	(0)
2019–2021	Nottingham Forest	40	(0)
2021–2022	Lens B	10	(0)

International career
2009–2017	Mali	36	(2)
- * Club domestic league appearances and goals

Samba Sow (born 29 April 1989) is a Malian former professional footballer who played as a defensive or central midfielder.

== Club career ==
Sow played his first game for RC Lens on 22 May 2009, the season Lens won Ligue 2. He scored his first goal for the club on 15 May 2010 in the 36th minute against Bordeaux, which they won 4–3. He scored in the 95th minute to make the score 3–0 in the Coupe de la Ligue 1st round against Clermont on 22 July 2011.

On 20 June 2017, he moved to the Russian Premier League, signing with FC Dynamo Moscow. He extended his Dynamo contract on 30 December 2017.

On 1 August 2019, Sow signed for EFL Championship side Nottingham Forest on a two-year deal. Sow was a key player for Forest during the 2019–20 season. Notably, Forest had a win rate of 52% when Sow was in the team, compared to 30% when he was not playing. He featured less regularly during his second season at Forest due to a recurring injury problem, and was released following the end of his contract on 1 June 2021.

== International career ==
Sow played his first game for Mali on 27 December 2009, against North Korea in a 1–0 defeat for Mali.

== Career statistics ==
=== Club ===
As of match played 11 December 2021

Appearances and goals by club, season and competition
Club	Season	League			National Cup		League Cup		Other		Total	
Club	Season	Division	Apps	Goals	Apps	Goals	Apps	Goals	Apps	Goals	Apps	Goals
Lens	2008–09	Ligue 2	1	0	0	0	0	0	—		1	0
Lens	2009–10	Ligue 1	31	1	4	0	1	0	—		36	1
Lens	2010–11	Ligue 1	10	0	1	0	0	0	—		11	0
Lens	2011–12	Ligue 2	23	0	0	0	1	1	—		24	1
Lens	2012–13	Ligue 2	25	0	2	0	0	0	—		27	0
Lens	Total		90	1	7	0	2	1	—		99	2
Lens B	2010–11	Championnat de France Amateur	5	0	—		—		—		5	0
Lens B	2012–13	Championnat de France Amateur	1	0	—		—		—		1	0
Lens B	Total		6	0	—		—		—		6	0
Kardemir Karabükspor	2013–14	Süper Lig	32	0	4	0	—		—		36	0
Kardemir Karabükspor	2014–15	Süper Lig	18	1	2	0	—		4 (Note: Appearances in the UEFA Europa League)	0	24	1
Kardemir Karabükspor	Total		50	1	6	0	—		4	0	60	1
Kayserispor	2015–16	Süper Lig	16	1	8	0	—		—		24	1
Kayserispor	2016–17	Süper Lig	25	2	8	0	—		—		33	2
Kayserispor	Total		41	3	16	0	—		—		57	3
Dynamo Moscow	2017–18	Russian Premier League	23	0	1	0	—		—		24	0
Dynamo Moscow	2018–19	Russian Premier League	17	0	1	0	—		—		18	0
Dynamo Moscow	2019–20	Russian Premier League	1	0	0	0	—		—		1	0
Dynamo Moscow	Total		41	0	2	0	—		—		43	0
Nottingham Forest	2019–20	EFL Championship	25	0	0	0	1	0	0	0	26	0
Nottingham Forest	2020–21	EFL Championship	15	0	1	0	0	0	0	0	16	0
Nottingham Forest	Total		40	0	1	0	1	0	0	0	42	0
Lens B	2021–22	Championnat National 2	5	0	—		—		—		5	0
Career total			273	5	32	0	3	1	4	0	312	6

=== International ===
As of 17 June 2019

Appearances and goals by national team and year
National team	Year	Apps	Goals
Mali	2009	1	0
Mali	2010	4	0
Mali	2011	4	0
Mali	2012	9	0
Mali	2013	7	0
Mali	2014	2	0
Mali	2015	6	2
Mali	2016	2	0
Mali	2017	1	0
Total		36	2

Scores and results list Mali's goal tally first, score column indicates score after each Sow goal.

List of international goals scored by Samba Sow
No.	Date	Venue	Opponent	Score	Result	Competition
1	6 June 2015	Centre Sportif Maâmora, Salé, Morocco	Libya	2–1	2–2	Friendly
2	14 November 2015	Francistown Stadium, Francistown, Botswana	Botswana	2–1	2–1	2018 FIFA World Cup qualification

== Honours ==
Lens

- Ligue 2: 2008–09

Mali

- Africa Cup of Nations bronze: 2013
