= Yohan Benalouane =

Tunisian footballer (born 1987)

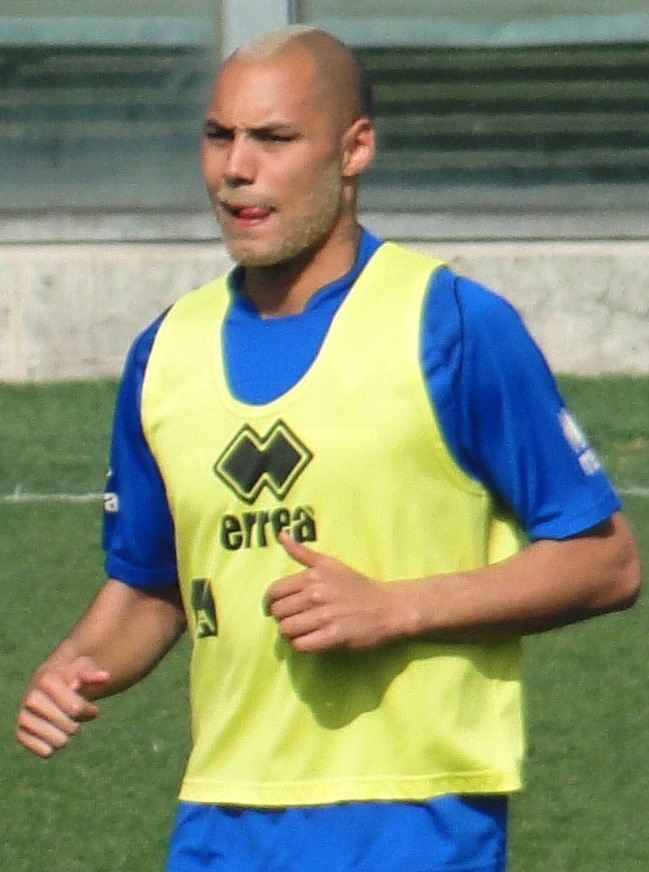
- Benalouane training with Atalanta in 2014

Personal information
- Full name: Yohan Ben Alouane
- Date of birth: 28 March 1987 (age 39)
- Place of birth: Bagnols-sur-Cèze, France
- Height: 1.87 m (6 ft 2 in)
- Position: Centre back

Youth career
- 1996–2000: FC Tricastin
- 2000–2001: Racing Blondel Bollène
- 2001–2005: Saint-Étienne

Senior career*
Years	Team	Apps	(Gls)
2005–2007	Saint-Étienne B	2	(0)
2007–2010	Saint-Étienne	66	(2)
2010–2012	Cesena	26	(0)
2012–2014	Parma	25	(1)
2014–2015	→ Atalanta (loan)	44	(1)
2015–2019	Leicester City	16	(0)
2016	→ Fiorentina (loan)	0	(0)
2019–2020	Nottingham Forest	15	(1)
2020–2022	Aris	22	(0)
2022–2023	Novara	24	(2)

International career^{‡}
2008	France U21	1	(0)
2018	Tunisia	5	(0)
- * Club domestic league appearances and goals as of 09:54, 1 June 2023 (UTC) ‡ National team caps and goals as of 11:38, 17 July 2019 (UTC)

Yohan Ben Alouane (Arabic: يوهان بن علوان, also known as Yohan Benalouane; born 28 March 1987) is a Tunisian former professional footballer who played as a defender.

Born in France, Benalouane represented the country as a youth before switching to Tunisia, country of his origins, at senior international level.

== Club career ==
=== Saint-Étienne ===
Benalouane started out his professional career at a French club Saint-Étienne, playing exclusively for the reserves in 2005 before successfully promoted to the first team in 2007.

=== Cesena ===
On 31 August 2010, Benalouane joined Serie A club Cesena for an undisclosed fee. After a particularly poor performance in a 2–0 loss against Bologna in December 2010, Benalouane was substituted. On leaving the pitch, and being jeered by Cesena supporters, he stormed past the bench and headed straight down the tunnel. He later publicly apologised for his behaviour.

=== Parma and Atalanta ===
In the summer of 2012, Benalouane was loaned to Parma, making his move permanent in July 2013 in a co-ownership deal. He signed a five-year contract with the Serie A outfit. On 3 January 2014, he joined Atalanta on a loan deal.

=== Leicester City ===
On 3 August 2015, Benalouane joined Premier League club Leicester City on a four-year contract for an undisclosed fee, reported to be €8 million. On 31 January 2016, he joined Italian club ACF Fiorentina on loan until the end of the season, but did not play for the club due to injury. In June 2016, Benalouane filed an appeal with the Lega Serie A over unpaid wages from Fiorentina, whose sporting director claimed Leicester had deceived them over the player's fitness. He played only four league games (all as a substitute) in the 2015–16 Premier League season, when Leicester became champions, making him ineligible for a winner's medal (minimum five league matches required).

Following the close of the transfer window, Benalouane was excluded from Leicester City's finalised squad for the 2016–17 Premier League season. Benalouane spent most of the season playing for the reserves, but returned to the first team in January 2017 following the departures of Luis Hernández and Jeffrey Schlupp. He played his first senior game of the 2016–17 season in a 3–1 FA Cup fourth-round replay win over Derby County on 8 February 2017.

=== Nottingham Forest ===
On 18 January 2019 it was announced that Benalouane had become new manager Martin O'Neill's first signing for Nottingham Forest. He made his debut for the club the following day, playing the full 90 minutes of a 0–1 home defeat to Bristol City. He scored his first goal for the club in a 1–0 win over arch-rivals Derby County on 25 February 2019.

=== Aris ===
After having his contract cancelled with Forest by mutual consent, Benalouane subsequently joined Super League Greece side Aris until the end of the 2021–22 season.

=== Novara ===
On 14 July 2022, Benalouane signed a one-year contract, with an option to extend, with Novara in the Italian third-tier Serie C.

== International career ==
Benalouane was eligible to play either for France (by place of birth) or Tunisia (through parentage). Despite playing once for the French under 21 team, he submitted a transfer request to represent the Tunisian senior team in 2010. However, despite receiving a call-up against Chad in an African Cup of Nations qualifier, he missed the game because he failed to be vaccinated prior to travel to Chad.

In October he refused to join Tunisia for the match against Togo, for which he expected to receive a call-up from Laurent Blanc instead. However, FIFA warned Benalouane that as the paperwork had been completed, he could represent Tunisia only, a refusal to show up may risk a ban in club football. Benalouane refused another call-up in August 2013.

In March 2018, Benalouane was once again called up by Tunisia, and this time he accepted the call up. Benalouane made his debut for Tunisia in a 1–0 victory over Iran on 23 March 2018, playing the full match. He was named in Tunisia's final 23-man squad for the 2018 World Cup in Russia.

== Career statistics ==
=== Club ===
As of match played 22 July 2020

Appearances and goals by club, season and competition
Club	Season	League			National cup		League cup		Other		Total	
Club	Season	Division	Apps	Goals	Apps	Goals	Apps	Goals	Apps	Goals	Apps	Goals
Saint-Étienne	2007–08	Ligue 1	7	0	0	0	0	0	—		7	0
Saint-Étienne	2008–09	Ligue 1	29	1	0	0	0	0	9	1	38	2
Saint-Étienne	2009–10	Ligue 1	29	1	2	0	1	0	0	0	32	0
Saint-Étienne	2010–11	Ligue 1	1	0	0	0	0	0	0	0	1	0
Saint-Étienne	Total		66	2	2	0	1	0	9	1	78	3
Cesena	2010–11	Serie A	15	0	1	0	—		—		16	0
Cesena	2011–12	Serie A	11	0	3	1	—		—		14	1
Cesena	2012–13	Serie A	0	0	2	0	—		—		2	0
Cesena	Total		26	0	6	1	—		—		32	1
Parma	2012–13	Serie A	21	1	1	0	—		—		22	1
Parma	2013–14	Serie A	4	0	1	0	—		—		5	0
Parma	Total		25	1	2	0	—		—		27	1
Atalanta (loan)	2013–14	Serie A	17	0	1	0	—		—		18	0
Atalanta (loan)	2014–15	Serie A	27	1	2	0	—		—		29	1
Atalanta (loan)	Total		44	1	3	0	—		—		47	1
Leicester City	2015–16	Premier League	4	0	2	0	3	0	—		9	0
Leicester City	2016–17	Premier League	11	0	2	0	0	0	2	0	18	0
Leicester City	2017–18	Premier League	1	0	3	0	1	0	—		5	0
Leicester City	Total		16	0	7	0	4	0	2	0	29	0
Fiorentina (loan)	2015–16	Serie A	0	0	0	0	—		0	0	0	0
Nottingham Forest	2018–19	Championship	14	1	0	0	0	0	—		14	1
Nottingham Forest	2019-20	Championship	1	0	1	0	0	0	—		2	0
Nottingham Forest	Total		15	1	1	0	0	0	—		16	1
Career total			192	5	21	1	5	0	11	1	229	7

=== International ===
As of match played 17 July 2019

Appearances and goals by national team and year
National team	Year	Apps	Goals
Tunisia	2018	5	0
Total		5	0
