= Arvin Appiah =

English footballer (born 2001)

Personal information
- Full name: Arvin Amoakoh Appiah
- Date of birth: 5 January 2001 (age 25)
- Place of birth: Amsterdam, Netherlands
- Height: 5 ft 9 in (1.75 m)
- Position: Winger

Team information
- Current team: Bristol Rovers
- Number: 28

Youth career
- 2010–2018: Nottingham Forest

Senior career*
Years	Team	Apps	(Gls)
2018–2019	Nottingham Forest	6	(0)
2019–2026	Almería	54	(2)
2020	Almería B	4	(0)
2021	→ Lugo (loan)	13	(0)
2022	→ Tenerife (loan)	11	(0)
2023	→ Málaga (loan)	10	(1)
2023–2024	→ Rotherham United (loan)	29	(0)
2024–2025	→ Nacional (loan)	26	(0)
2025–2026	→ Amiens (loan)	14	(0)
2026–	Bristol Rovers	3	(0)

International career^{‡}
2016–2017	England U16	4	(1)
2017–2018	England U17	10	(3)
2018–2019	England U18	11	(3)
2019	England U19	5	(0)
- * Club domestic league appearances and goals as of 18:02, 12 November 2026 (UTC) ‡ National team caps and goals as of 12:39, 17 November 2019 (UTC)

Arvin Amoakoh Appiah (born 5 January 2001) is a professional footballer who plays as a winger for EFL League Two club Bristol Rovers. Born in the Netherlands, he represented England at youth level.

== Club career ==
=== Nottingham Forest ===
Appiah made his professional debut for Nottingham Forest on 30 October 2018, appearing as an 85th-minute substitute and scoring a goal in a 3–2 loss in a fourth round EFL Cup game against Burton Albion.

On 23 January 2019, Appiah penned a four-and-a-half-year contract extension with Forest.

=== Almería ===
On 2 September 2019 Appiah signed for Spanish Segunda División side Almería on a five-year deal for an undisclosed fee, reported to be £8 million.

On 1 February 2021, Appiah moved to fellow second division team CD Lugo, on a loan deal until the end of the season. Upon returning, he was mainly a backup option as the Rojiblancos achieved promotion to La Liga as champions.

On 1 September 2022, Appiah was loaned to CD Tenerife in the second level for the season. On 30 December, however, his loan was cut short, and he moved to fellow second-tier side Málaga CF on 9 January, also in a temporary deal.

On 25 August 2023, Appiah returned to England when he joined Championship club Rotherham United on a season-long loan deal. On 30 July of the following year, he moved to Portuguese Primeira Liga side Nacional also on loan for one year.

On 30 July 2025, Appiah switched teams and countries again after agreeing to a one-year loan deal with Ligue 2 side Amiens.

=== Bristol Rovers ===
On 6 October 2026, Appiah joined League Two club Bristol Rovers on a short-term deal until January.

== International career ==
In May 2018, Appiah scored for England U17 against Italy in the group stage of the 2018 UEFA European Under-17 Championship. The hosts were eliminated by the Netherlands at the semi-final stage on a penalty shootout with Appiah successfully converting his spot kick.

In October 2018, Appiah scored for the England U18s against Sweden. In March 2019, Appiah received his first call-up for the England U19s for the 2019 U19 EURO Elite Qualifying Round and made his U19 debut as a 66th-minute substitute during the 4–1 win over Czech Republic at St. George's Park.

== Personal life ==
Appiah was born in Amsterdam, before moving to Nottingham in England when he was six-years old. Appiah is of Ghanaian descent.

Appiah's older brother Nathaniel is also a footballer. A defender, he came through the ranks at Rochdale.

== Career statistics ==
As of match played 10 November 2026

Appearances and goals by club, season and competition
Club	Season	League			Cup		League Cup		Other		Total	
Club	Season	Division	Apps	Goals	Apps	Goals	Apps	Goals	Apps	Goals	Apps	Goals
Nottingham Forest	2018–19	EFL Championship	6	0	0	0	1	1	—		7	1
Nottingham Forest	2019–20	EFL Championship	0	0	0	0	1	0	—		1	0
Nottingham Forest	Total		6	0	0	0	2	1	0	0	8	1
Almería	2019–20	Segunda División	21	1	1	0	—		2 (Note: Appearances in Segunda División play-offs)	0	24	1
Almería	2020–21	Segunda División	1	0	1	1	—		0	0	2	1
Almería	2021–22	Segunda División	31	1	3	1	—		0	0	34	2
Almería	2022–23	La Liga	0	0	0	0	—		0	0	0	0
Almería	Total		53	2	5	2	0	0	2	0	58	4
Almería B	2020–21	Tercera División	4	0	0	0	—		0	0	4	0
CD Lugo (loan)	2020–21	Segunda División	13	0	0	0	—		0	0	13	0
CD Tenerife (loan)	2022–23	Segunda División	11	0	2	0	—		0	0	13	0
Málaga CF (loan)	2022–23	Segunda División	6	0	0	0	—		0	0	6	0
Rotherham United (loan)	2023–24	EFL Championship	29	0	1	0	1	0	—		31	0
Nacional (loan)	2024–25	Primeira Liga	26	0	1	0	0	0	0	0	27	0
Amiens (loan)	2025–26	Ligue 2	14	0	0	0	0	0	0	0	14	0
Bristol Rovers	2026–27	EFL League Two	3	0	0	0	0	0	2 (Note: Appearance(s) in EFL Trophy)	1	5	1
Career total			163	2	9	2	3	1	4	1	177	6
