= Andy Davies (footballer) =

Welsh football player and manager

Personal information
- Full name: Andrew Davies
- Date of birth: 13 September 1978 (age 48)
- Place of birth: Wrexham, Wales

Youth career
- Wrexham

Senior career*
Years	Team	Apps	(Gls)
- Flint Town United
- Cefn Druids

Managerial career
- 2018: Wrexham (caretaker)
- * Club domestic league appearances and goals

Andrew Davies (born 13 September 1978) is a Welsh former football player and manager. He held various roles in over 25 years at Wrexham, including as caretaker manager in 2018. He was assistant manager to Dean Keates in two spells at Wrexham and another at Walsall.

== Career ==
Born in Wrexham, Davies grew up as a supporter of his local team Wrexham AFC. He was signed as a youth player for the club, and began coaching while playing for Flint Town United and Cefn Druids. He then coached Wrexham at under-18 level and was head of youth, a post with responsibilities for all players aged between 9 and 18.

On 13 October 2016, Wrexham sacked manager Gary Mills and named three employees as caretaker manager: captain Dean Keates, reserve manager Joey Jones, and Davies. Twelve days later, Keates was confirmed as manager with Davies as assistant, ahead of a 2–2 draw at home to Barrow in the National League; Keates accidentally punched Davies in the face celebrating the first goal, and Davies accidentally dislocated Keates's finger while celebrating the second.

With Wrexham fourth in the league on 16 March 2018, Keates departed for his hometown club Walsall, and Davies was put in charge for the remainder of the season; his debut the following day was a 2–2 draw away to Woking. After three consecutive defeats in the run-up, the season ended on 28 April with a goalless draw against AFC Fylde at the Racecourse Ground, leaving Wrexham in 10th place; the team were three points off the playoff places in their 10th consecutive season in Non-League football.

Davies's 25-year connection to Wrexham ended on 10 May 2018, as he reunited with Keates at Walsall. Keates was dismissed on 6 April 2019 after a 3–1 home loss to Oxford United, while Davies stayed on alongside caretaker Martin O'Connor for the remainder of the season.

Davies returned to Wrexham alongside Keates on 6 October 2019. They left at the end of the 2020–21 National League season, as their contracts were not renewed due to missing out on the playoffs.
