= Ben Watson (footballer, born July 1985) =

English footballer

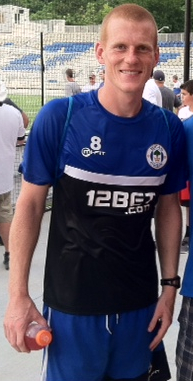
- Watson with Wigan Athletic in 2013

Personal information
- Date of birth: 9 July 1985 (age 41)
- Place of birth: Camberwell, England
- Height: 5 ft 10 in (1.78 m)
- Position: Midfielder

Youth career
- –2003: Millwall

Senior career*
Years	Team	Apps	(Gls)
2003–2009	Crystal Palace	169	(18)
2009–2015	Wigan Athletic	111	(13)
2009	→ Queens Park Rangers (loan)	16	(2)
2010	→ West Bromwich Albion (loan)	7	(1)
2015–2018	Watford	67	(2)
2018–2020	Nottingham Forest	76	(3)
2020–2022	Charlton Athletic	38	(1)
Total		484	(40)

International career
2004–2006	England U21	2	(0)
- * Club domestic league appearances and goals

Ben Watson (born 9 July 1985) is an English former professional footballer who played as a midfielder.

Watson has previously played for Crystal Palace, Wigan Athletic, Watford, Nottingham Forest and Charlton Athletic and had loan spells at Queens Park Rangers and West Bromwich Albion. He has also represented England at U21 level.

Watson won an FA Cup winners medal with Wigan in 2013, and scored a 90th minute header and the only goal of the game against Manchester City. This was the first major trophy Wigan had won.

== Club career ==
=== Crystal Palace ===
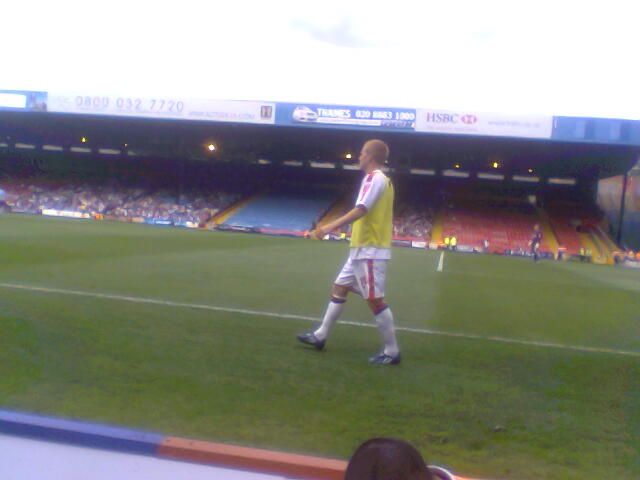
Watson warming up during a game with Crystal Palace in 2008.

Born in Camberwell, London, Watson made his debut for Crystal Palace, aged 17, towards the end of the 2002–03 season against Watford, giving a good performance to keep his place in the side for the final four games of the season. He scored his first goal for the club at the start of the following season in a 1–1 draw against Millwall, and gradually featured in the Palace side more regularly over the next few seasons, surpassing 200 appearances for the Eagles before his 23rd birthday.

In 2006, he was one of six nominees for the "League Cup New Talent Award", drawn up by the Football Writers' Association. He was also named as Palace's "Young Player of The Year" at the end of the season, and was rewarded with a new contract, keeping him at the club until 2009.

==== Interest from other clubs ====
At the outset of the 2008–09 season, Watson had one year left on his contract at Palace. The club reportedly offered him a new contract that would have made him Palace's highest-paid player, which was subsequently turned down. He also turned down a move to Nottingham Forest, who claimed he was demanding too high a salary, amidst rumours that he was seeking an offer from Queens Park Rangers. However a move never materialised before the end of the summer, and Watson returned to the Palace side, scoring five times in just 18 appearances before suffering an injury in early December. This turned out to be Watson's last appearance for the Eagles.

=== Wigan Athletic ===
In late January, Middlesbrough offered £2 million for Watson and were expected to sign the midfielder, who underwent a medical examination. Wigan Athletic entered the race to sign him late on, and were successful in securing the deal after matching Boro's offer. He made his debut for the club in a 0–0 draw against Aston Villa on 31 January, and scored his first league goal for Wigan in the 2–1 away victory over Sunderland at the Stadium of Light. On 23 March 2009, he followed this up with a goal in his next game at home against Hull City.

==== Loans to QPR and West Bromwich Albion ====
On 1 September 2009, Watson signed for Championship side Queens Park Rangers (QPR) on loan until January 2010. Watson then made his debut 11 days later on 12 September in a 1–1 draw against Peterborough United at Loftus Road. He scored his first goal for QPR in a 5–2 win over Barnsley on 26 September 2009. Watson was sent off on 21 October in a 4–1 win over struggling Reading, serving a two match ban.

On 22 February 2010, Watson signed on loan for Championship club West Bromwich Albion, initially until the end of the 2009–10 season. He scored his first goal for West Brom against Preston North End on 20 March 2010. Having not made a league appearance for Wigan Athletic during the 2009–10 season, Watson hinted that he would like to sign a permanent deal at West Brom if the club could gain promotion to the Premier League. He was recalled from his loan early by Wigan on 1 April 2010.

==== Return to Wigan Athletic ====
Watson made his return to the first-team on 4 April in a 2–1 defeat against Fulham, and scored in Wigan's 3–2 win over Arsenal at the DW Stadium on 18 April 2010. He kept his place in the team for the rest of the season, finishing with five league appearances for the club.

Watson lost his place in the starting eleven at the beginning of the 2010–11 season, limiting his playing time for the first half of the season. He regained his place in the side after Christmas, and was a regular starter for the rest of the season. Now being deployed in a deep-lying playmaker role, his impressive form in the second half of the season helped the team escape relegation and retain their place in the Premier League. In August 2011, Watson signed a new three-year contract at the club.

In November 2012, in a match against Liverpool, Watson suffered a broken right leg in a challenge with Raheem Sterling. Wigan lost the match 3–0.

Watson made his return to first-team action in May 2013 against West Bromwich Albion in a 3–2 away victory for Wigan, playing out of his usual position as a sweeper. Watson scored the winning goal in the 2013 FA Cup Final against Manchester City, a stoppage time header that gave Wigan Athletic their first FA Cup.

On 13 May 2014, Watson signed a new one-year deal with the Latics.

=== Watford ===
Watson joined Watford on 23 January 2015. He made his league debut the following day in a 7–2 win over Blackpool. Almost a year later, Watson scored his first goal for the Hornets, which he scored directly from a corner in a 2–1 loss at home to Manchester City. Watson was not awarded the goal until more than a week after the game, as it was initially recorded as an Aleksandar Kolarov own goal, before a Premier League panel awarded it to Watson.

In 2018, Watson's contract was cancelled by mutual consent at the end of the January transfer window.

=== Nottingham Forest ===
Watson joined Nottingham Forest on 5 February 2018 on a 2 1/2-year contract.

During the 2018–19 season, Watson found first team opportunities at Forest limited, and was told by manager Martin O'Neill that he was free to leave the club. However, Watson went on to become a key figure during the following campaign under new manager Sabri Lamouchi, who described Watson as being the 'brains' of his side. He scored his first goal for the club in a 1–0 win over Barnsley on 21 September 2019. Watson left Nottingham Forest at the end of his contract following the 2019–20 season. Although Forest were hopeful that he would agree an extension, Watson reportedly wished to move to London to be closer to his family.

=== Charlton Athletic ===
Watson joined Charlton ahead of the 2020–21 season. He scored his first goal for Charlton in a 1–1 draw against Shrewsbury Town on 5 December 2020.

On 22 June 2021, it was confirmed that Watson had signed a new one-year deal with the club ahead of the 2021–22 season.

On 10 May 2022, it was confirmed that Watson would leave Charlton Athletic when his contract expired.

On 10 August 2022, Watson announced his retirement from professional football at the age of 37.

== Personal life ==
His son, Reggie, is currently a player at Chelsea academy.

== Career statistics ==
As of match played 25 January 2022

Appearances and goals by club, season and competition
Club	Season	League			FA Cup		League Cup		Other		Total	
Club	Season	Division	Apps	Goals	Apps	Goals	Apps	Goals	Apps	Goals	Apps	Goals
Crystal Palace	2002–03	First Division	5	0	0	0	0	0	—		5	0
Crystal Palace	2003–04	First Division	16	1	1	0	4	0	0	0	21	1
Crystal Palace	2004–05	Premier League	21	0	1	0	2	0	—		24	0
Crystal Palace	2005–06	Championship	42	4	2	0	2	0	2 (Note: Appearances in Championship play-offs)	0	48	4
Crystal Palace	2006–07	Championship	25	3	0	0	1	0	—		26	3
Crystal Palace	2007–08	Championship	42	5	1	0	1	0	2	2	46	7
Crystal Palace	2008–09	Championship	18	5	0	0	1	0	—		19	5
Crystal Palace	Total		169	18	5	0	11	0	4	2	189	20
Wigan Athletic	2008–09	Premier League	10	2	0	0	0	0	—		10	2
Wigan Athletic	2009–10	Premier League	5	1	2	1	1	0	—		8	2
Wigan Athletic	2010–11	Premier League	29	3	1	0	4	1	—		34	4
Wigan Athletic	2011–12	Premier League	21	3	1	0	1	1	—		23	4
Wigan Athletic	2012–13	Premier League	12	1	1	1	2	0	—		15	2
Wigan Athletic	2013–14	Championship	25	2	3	2	0	0	5 (Note: One appearance in FA Community Shield, four appearances and one goal in UEFA Europa League)	1	33	5
Wigan Athletic	2014–15	Championship	9	1	1	0	0	0	—		10	1
Wigan Athletic	Total		111	13	9	4	8	2	5	1	133	20
Queens Park Rangers (loan)	2009–10	Championship	16	2	0	0	0	0	—		16	2
West Bromwich Albion (loan)	2009–10	Championship	7	1	0	0	0	0	—		7	1
Watford	2014–15	Championship	20	0	0	0	0	0	—		20	0
Watford	2015–16	Premier League	35	2	5	0	1	0	—		41	2
Watford	2016–17	Premier League	4	0	1	0	1	0	—		6	0
Watford	2017–18	Premier League	8	0	2	0	1	0	—		11	0
Watford	Total		67	2	8	0	3	0	0	0	78	2
Nottingham Forest	2017–18	Championship	14	0	0	0	0	0	—		14	0
Nottingham Forest	2018–19	Championship	17	0	0	0	4	0	—		21	0
Nottingham Forest	2019–20	Championship	45	3	0	0	0	0	—		45	3
Nottingham Forest	Total		76	3	0	0	4	0	0	0	80	3
Charlton Athletic	2020–21	League One	29	1	0	0	0	0	1 (Note: Appearance(s) in the EFL Trophy)	0	30	1
Charlton Athletic	2021–22	League One	9	0	1	0	1	0	3	0	14	0
Charlton Athletic	Total		38	1	1	0	1	0	4	0	44	1
Career total			484	40	23	4	27	2	13	3	547	49

== Honours ==
Crystal Palace

- Football League First Division play-offs: 2004

Wigan Athletic

- FA Cup: 2012–13

Watford

- Football League Championship second-place promotion: 2014–15
