= Alexander Milošević =

Swedish footballer (born 1992)

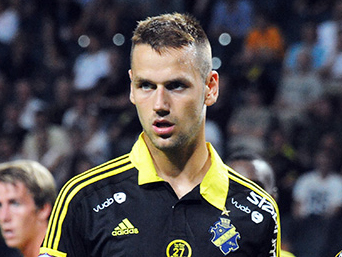
- Milošević with AIK in 2014

Personal information
- Full name: Goran Alexander Sjöström Milošević
- Date of birth: 30 January 1992 (age 34)
- Place of birth: Rissne, Sweden
- Height: 1.92 m (6 ft 4 in)
- Position: Centre-back

Youth career
- –2000: Rissne IF
- 2000–2008: Vasalund IF

Senior career*
Years	Team	Apps	(Gls)
2009–2010	Vasalund IF	24	(5)
2011–2014	AIK	80	(4)
2015–2017	Beşiktaş	2	(0)
2016	→ Hannover 96 (loan)	10	(0)
2016–2017	→ Darmstadt 98 (loan)	18	(0)
2017	→ Çaykur Rizespor (loan)	5	(0)
2018	AIK	27	(0)
2019	Nottingham Forest	12	(1)
2020	Vejle BK	10	(0)
2021–2024	AIK	82	(6)
2025	Portsmouth	0	(0)
Total		270	(16)

International career
2009	Serbia U17	5	(0)
2011	Sweden U19	1	(0)
2011–2016	Sweden U21/O	28	(3)
2013–2022	Sweden	9	(0)
Medal record
Men's football
Representing Sweden
UEFA European Under-21 Championship
Winner	2015 Czech Republic
- * Club domestic league appearances and goals

Goran Alexander Sjöström Milošević (Serbian pronunciation: [alě̞ksaːndar milǒːʃeʋitɕ], Serbian Cyrillic: Александaр Милошевић; born 30 January 1992) is a Swedish former professional footballer who played as a centre-back. A full international between 2013 and 2022, he won nine caps for the Sweden national team.

== Club career ==
=== Early career ===
Milošević began his career playing for Rissne IF and later transferred to Vasalund IF. Operating as a striker till the age of 17, at Vasalund he first switched position to the central midfield and was then persuaded to move back to the central defense where he flourished. During the 2010 season he scored five times for Vasalund IF, one from a penalty kick.

=== AIK ===
On the first of February 2011 he signed a four-year contract with his boyhood favourites AIK after a long and drawn out process that included training with AIK rivals Djurgårdens IF. He has also trained with Scottish club Celtic and Serie A club Fiorentina.

When AIK defender Per Karlsson was injured during pre-season training, Milošević was selected to play from start in the first home game of the 2011 season against Mjällby. AIK won the match and Milošević received a lot of attention, not only for being named man of the match, but also for receiving a martial arts inspired kick to the head from Mjällbys Peter Gitselov. During a home game against Malmö FF on 12 June, he provided his first assist for the club.

Liverpool, Arsenal, Spurs and Sunderland all had scouts keeping a very close eye on the young defender. Serbian club FK Partizan and several Dutch clubs, including Ajax have also shown an interest. Bundesliga club Werder Bremen made an official bid for 600,000 euros, a bid that AIK turned down. His agent said that it would be good if the young player stayed with AIK for at least a year before moving on to a bigger club, but adds that if a good deal is offered, it is hard to turn it down.

He made his first goal in a home draw against GIF Sundsvall on 22 April 2012.

=== Beşiktaş ===
On 7 January 2015 Milošević signed a 3.5-year (with option to extend 2 more years) deal with Turkish club Beşiktaş for a fee of €1 million.

==== Loan to Hannover 96 ====
He was loaned to German Bundesliga side Hannover 96 on 1 February 2016 for the remainder of the season.

==== Loan to Darmstadt 98 ====
On 17 August 2016, Milošević signed a season-long loan deal with Bundesliga side SV Darmstadt 98. He said: "Everybody who has played in the Bundesliga wants to stay there."

==== Loan to Çaykur Rizespor ====
On 8 September 2017, he was loaned out to Çaykur Rizespor. On 13 December 2017, his loan agreement was mutually terminated.

==== Departure ====
On 18 December 2017, Milošević's contract was mutually terminated.

=== Return to AIK ===
On 28 February 2018 AIK announced they had signed an agreement with Milošević until 31 December 2018.

Milosevic played in 27 games as AIK won the 2018 Allsvenskan.

=== Nottingham Forest ===
On 1 February 2019, Milošević signed an eighteen-month contract with EFL Championship side Nottingham Forest. He scored his first goal for Nottingham Forest in a 3–0 win over Middlesbrough on 22 April 2019.

On 28 October 2019, Milošević's contract was terminated by mutual consent.

=== Vejle BK ===
On 29 July 2020, Milošević joined Danish Superliga side Vejle Boldklub on a free transfer, signing a two-year deal. He left the club again at the end of the year.

=== Second return to AIK ===
On 29 March 2021, AIK announced that Milošević had signed a one-year contract with AIK over the 2021 Allsvenskan season.

=== Portsmouth ===
On 7 March 2025, Milošević joined Championship side Portsmouth on a short-term deal until the end of the season. He departed the club upon the expiration of his short-term deal having failed to make an appearance.

== International career ==
=== Youth ===
Milošević played five games with the Serbian U17 team. In 2011, he accepted the Sweden U19 youth coach Hans Lindbom's invitation to a Sweden U19 training camp and soon received his first cap for both Sweden U19 and U21 squads. In the summer of 2015, he was part of the Sweden U21 squad that won the 2015 UEFA European Under-21 Championship. In 2016, he represented the Sweden Olympic football team at the 2016 Summer Olympics in Rio de Janeiro, Brazil.

=== Senior ===
Milošević made his full international debut for the Sweden national team on 26 January 2013, replacing Nicklas Backman in the 79th minute of a 3–0 friendly win against Finland. He made his competitive international debut for Sweden on 14 June 2015 in a UEFA Euro 2016 qualifier against Montenegro, playing for 90 minutes alongside Erik Berg at centre back in a 3–1 win.

== Personal life ==
Alexander's father Goran Milošević immigrated from Serbia, and his mother Monica is Swedish of Finnish descent.

== Career statistics ==
=== Club ===
As of 29 October 2023

Club	Season	League			Cup		Europe		Other		Total	
Club	Season	Division	Apps	Goals	Apps	Goals	Apps	Goals	Apps	Goals	Apps	Goals
Vasalund IF	2010	Division 1 Norra	24	5	0	0	—		—		24	5
AIK	2011	Allsvenskan	29	0	0	0	—		—		29	0
AIK	2012	Allsvenskan	6	1	0	0	0	0	1	0	7	1
AIK	2013	Allsvenskan	18	0	2	0	0	0	—		20	0
AIK	2014	Allsvenskan	27	3	1	0	3	0	—		31	3
AIK	Total		79	4	3	0	3	0	1	0	87	4
Beşiktaş	2014–15	Süper Lig	1	0	2	0	0	0	—		3	0
Beşiktaş	2015–16	Süper Lig	1	0	3	0	0	0	—		4	0
Beşiktaş	Total		2	0	5	0	0	0	—		7	0
Hannover 96 (loan)	2015–16	Bundesliga	10	0	0	0	—		—		10	0
Darmstadt 98 (loan)	2016–17	Bundesliga	18	0	2	0	—		—		20	0
Çaykur Rizespor (loan)	2017–18	Süper Lig	5	0	1	0	—		—		6	0
AIK	2018	Allsvenskan	27	0	3	1	4	0	—		34	1
Nottingham Forest	2018–19	EFL Championship	10	1	0	0	—		—		10	1
Vejle BK	2020–21	Danish Superliga	10	0	0	0	—		—		10	0
AIK	2021	Allsvenskan	27	3	0	0	—		—		27	3
AIK	2022	Allsvenskan	16	2	0	0	1	0	—		17	2
AIK	2023	Allsvenskan	23	1	4	0	—		—		27	1
AIK	Total		66	6	4	0	1	0	—		71	6
Career total			251	16	18	1	8	0	1	0	278	17

=== International ===
Appearances and goals by national team and year
National team	Year	Apps	Goals
Sweden	2013	1	0
Sweden	2014	1	0
Sweden	2015	2	0
Sweden	2016	1	0
Sweden	2017	0	0
Sweden	2018	0	0
Sweden	2019	2	0
Sweden	2020	0	0
Sweden	2021	0	0
Sweden	2022	2	0
Total		9	0

== Honours ==
AIK

- Allsvenskan 2018

Sweden U21

- UEFA European Under-21 Championship: 2015

Individual

- Allsvenskan Award for Best Newcomer: 2011
