= Virgil Gomis =

French footballer (born 1999)

Personal information
- Full name: Virgil Vilela Gomis
- Date of birth: 16 April 1999 (age 27)
- Place of birth: Limay, Yvelines, France
- Position: Forward

Team information
- Current team: GSI Pontivy

Youth career
- 2013–2015: FC Mantois
- 2015–2021: Nottingham Forest

Senior career*
Years	Team	Apps	(Gls)
2018–2021	Nottingham Forest	0	(0)
2018	→ Braintree Town (loan)	5	(1)
2019	→ Notts County (loan)	10	(0)
2019–2020	→ Macclesfield Town (loan)	11	(0)
2020–2021	→ Grimsby Town (loan)	5	(0)
2021–2022	Paris FC B	7	(1)
2023–2025	Pouzages Bocage	10	(9)
2025–	GSI Pontivy	25	(11)
- * Club domestic league appearances and goals as of 15:32, 1 October 2026 (UTC)

Virgil Vilela Gomis (born 16 April 1999) is a French professional footballer who plays as a forward for GSI Pontivy

He came through the FC Mantois academy he joined the youth academy of Nottingham Forest, where he signed professional terms in 2018. Gomis failed to make a single first team appearance for the Reds and was loaned out to Braintree Town, Notts County, Macclesfield Town and Grimsby Town before being released in 2021. He recently had a short spell with Paris FC B.

== Career ==
=== Nottingham Forest ===
After three seasons with the Nottingham Forest academy, Gomis joined National League side Braintree Town on a one-month loan on 31 October 2018, where he scored on his debut with the club. On 31 January 2019, Gomis again moved on loan, this time to Forest's city rivals Notts County, where he would remain for the rest of the 2018-19 season.

On 9 August 2019, Gomis joined League Two side Macclesfield Town on loan for the season. He scored his first goal for Macclesfield in an EFL Cup tie against Blackpool on 13 August 2019. Gomis was recalled from his loan early by Nottingham Forest on 3 January 2020.

On 16 October 2020, Gomis joined Grimsby Town on a season-long loan. On 5 January 2021, Grimsby decided to terminate his loan prematurely following only six first team appearances across all competitions.

Following the 2020-21 season, Gomis was not listed on Forest's retained player list.

=== Return to France ===
Gomis appeared for Paris FC's Championnat National 3 reserve team in September 2021.

In 2023, Gomis signed for French regional side Pouzages Bocage FC.
