= 2025–26 K Beerschot VA season =

K Beerschot VA
2025–26 season
- Owner: Abdullah bin Musaid Al Saud
- Manager: Mohamed Messoudi
- Stadium: Olympisch Stadion
- Challenger Pro League: 3rd
- Belgian Cup: Seventh round

Koninklijke Beerschot Voetbalclub Antwerpen competed in the 2025–26 season, its fourteenth since the merger and its first following relegation, participating in the Belgian Challenger Pro League and the Belgian Cup. In the league, it finished third, thereby qualifying for the promotion play-offs.

== Squad ==
As of 8 September 2025

Note: Flags indicate national team as defined under FIFA eligibility rules; some limited exceptions apply. Players may hold more than one non-FIFA nationality.

No.	Pos.	Nation	Player
1	GK	BEL	Xavier Gies
2	DF	FRA	Colin Dagba
3	DF	BEL	Milan Govaers
4	DF	NED	Brian Plat
5	DF	FRA	Loïc Mbe Soh
6	DF	BEL	Bas Van den Eynden
7	MF	NED	Rajiv van La Parra
8	MF	BEL	Lukas Van Eenoo
9	FW	LBR	Ayouba Kosiah
10	MF	BEL	Glenn Claes
11	MF	TUR	Emre Uzun
13	GK	MLI	Emile Doucouré
15	FW	COD	Arnold Vula
16	DF	BEL	Andres Labie (on loan from Zulte Waregem)
17	MF	BEL	Axl Van Himbeeck
18	MF	BEL	Ryan Sanusi

No.	Pos.	Nation	Player
19	FW	FRA	Sabri Guendouz
21	FW	TUN	Anas Haj Mohamed
24	DF	BUL	Edisson Jordanov
26	DF	BEL	Derrick Tshimanga
28	DF	BDI	Marco Weymans
32	FW	GRN	D'Margio Wright-Phillips
33	GK	BEL	Nick Shinton
41	FW	ESP	Oscar Vargas
42	MF	URU	Thiago Lugano
43	MF	BEL	Xander Joosen
44	MF	BEL	Rayhan El Grafel
45	FW	SRB	Ensar Brahić
46	MF	ALG	Keryane Mansouri
76	DF	NED	Dennis Gyamfi
78	MF	JPN	Genki Haraguchi
94	MF	ALG	Cyril Khetir

== Transfers ==
=== Transfers In ===
Pos.	Player	Transferred from	Fee	Date	Source
FW	(Germany) Florian Krüger	(Germany) 1. FC Saarbrücken	Loan return	30 June 2025	
DF	(Belgium) Bas Van den Eynden	(Belgium) Mechelen	Free	1 July 2025	
FW	(France) Sabri Guendouz	(France) Guingamp	Free	1 July 2025	
MF	(Algeria) Cyril Khetir	(France) Aubagne FC	Free	1 July 2025	
FW	(Belgium) Glenn Claes	(Belgium) Lierse	Free	10 July 2025	
DF	(Bulgaria) Edisson Jordanov	(Belgium) Westerlo	Free	10 July 2025	
MF	(Uruguay) Thiago Lugano	(Spain) Valladolid U19	Undisclosed	22 July 2025	
MF	(Belgium) Lukas Van Eenoo	(Belgium) Patro Eisden Maasmechelen	Undisclosed	22 July 2025	
MF	(Algeria) Keryane Mansouri	(France) Stade Reims U19	Free	22 July 2025	
MF	(Turkey) Emre Uzun	(Turkey) Antalyaspor	Undisclosed	22 July 2025	
FW	(Democratic Republic of the Congo) Arnold Vula	(France) Le Mans FC	Free	25 July 2025	
GK	(Belgium) Xavier Gies	(Belgium) Francs Borains	Free	31 July 2025	
DF	(Belgium) Andres Labie	(Belgium) OH Leuven	Loan	5 August 2025	
MF	(Japan) Genki Haraguchi	(Japan) Urawa Red Diamonds	Undisclosed	8 September 2025	
FW	(Tunisia) Anas Haj Mohamed	(Italy) Parma	Undisclosed	8 September 2025	

=== Transfers Out ===
Pos.	Player	Transferred to	Fee	Date	Source
FW	(Suriname) Daishawn Redan	(Belgium) Avellino	Loan return	30 June 2025	
MF	(Saudi Arabia) Faisal Al-Ghamdi	(Saudi Arabia) Al-Ittihad	Loan return	30 June 2025	
FW	(Saudi Arabia) Marwan Al-Sahafi	(Saudi Arabia) Al-Ittihad	Loan return	30 June 2025	
DF	(Egypt) Omar Fayed	(Turkey) Fenerbahçe	Loan return	30 June 2025	
MF	(Rwanda) Hakim Sahabo	(Belgium) Standard Liège	Loan return	30 June 2025	
MF	(Belgium) Welat Cagro	(Portugal) Portimonense	End of contract	1 July 2025	
DF	(Greece) Apostolos Konstantopoulos	(Poland) Raków Częstochowa	End of contract	1 July 2025	
GK	(Croatia) Davor Matijaš	(Croatia) HNK Gorica	Undisclosed	1 July 2025	
DF	(France) Félix Nzouango		End of contract	1 July 2025	
FW	(Belgium) Tom Reyners	(Belgium) Lommel	End of contract	1 July 2025	
FW	(Belgium) Antoine Colassin	(Belgium) Charleroi	Undisclosed	8 July 2025	
MF	(Scotland) Ewan Henderson	(England) Wycombe Wanderers	Undisclosed	14 July 2025	
DF	(Curaçao) Ar'jany Martha	(England) Rotherham United	Undisclosed	30 July 2025	
MF	(Netherlands) Dean Huiberts	(Italy) Pro Vercelli	Undisclosed	15 August 2025	
FW	(Germany) Florian Krüger	(Germany) MSV Duisburg	Undisclosed	1 September 2025	

== Friendlies ==
19 July 2025	Beerschot (Belgium)	0–2	(Belgium) Cercle Brugge

26 July 2025	FC Groningen (Netherlands)	3–1	(Belgium) Beerschot

2 August 2025	Beerschot (Belgium)	1–1	(Italy) Venezia

== Competitions ==
=== Overall record ===
Competition	First match	Last match	Starting round	Record							
Competition	First match	Last match	Starting round	Pld	W	D	L	GF	GA	GD	Win %
Challenger Pro League	8 August 2025	19 April 2026	Matchday 1	5	3	2	0	7	3	+4	60.00
Belgian Cup	5 September 2025		Sixth round	1	1	0	0	1	0	+1	100.00
Total				6	4	2	0	8	3	+5	66.67

Last updated: 12 September 2025
Source: Competitions

=== Challenger Pro League ===
==== League table ====
Pos	Team	Pld	W	D	L	GF	GA	GD	Pts	Qualification
1	Beveren (C, P)	32	28	4	0	74	23	+51	88	Promoted to Pro League
2	Kortrijk (P)	32	21	4	7	59	33	+26	67	Promoted to Pro League
3	Beerschot	32	19	7	6	52	31	+21	64	Qualification for promotion play-offs
4	RFC Liège	32	16	5	11	44	39	+5	53	Qualification for promotion play-offs
5	Lommel	32	15	8	9	59	46	+13	53	Qualification for promotion play-offs

Source: Challenger Pro League
Rules for classification: 1) Points; 2) Matches won; 3) Goal difference; 4) Goals scored; 5) Away matches won; 6) Away goal difference; 7) Away goals made.
(C) Champions; (P) Promoted

==== Results summary ====
Overall								Home						Away					
Pld	W	D	L	GF	GA	GD	Pts	W	D	L	GF	GA	GD	W	D	L	GF	GA	GD
32	19	7	6	52	31	+21	64	9	4	3	25	15	+10	10	3	3	27	16	+11

Last updated: 17 April 2026.
Source: worldfootball

==== Results by round ====
Round	1	2	3	4	5	6	7	8	9	10
Ground	A	H	A	H	A	H	A	H		H
Result	W	D	D	W	W	W	W	W		D
Position	5	4	5	4	3	3	3	3		3

Updated to match(es) played on 17 October 2025. Source:
A = Away; H = Home; W = Win; D = Draw; L = Loss

==== Matches ====
The match schedule was announced on 3 July 2025.

8 August 2025 1	RFC Seraing	1–2	Beerschot	Seraing
21:00 CEST	Thiago Paulo da Silva (yellow card) 43' (yellow-red card) 58'; Noah Solheid 64'; Bassim Boukteb (yellow card) 85'; Matteo Scarpinati (yellow card) 90'	[https://www.worldfootball.net/match-report/co131/belgium-challenger-pro-league/ma11244218/rfc-seraing_k-beerschot-va/lineup/ Report}	Van Eenoo (yellow card) 40'; Bas Van den Eynden (yellow card) 51' (goal) 88'; Ensar Brahić 90'	Stadium: Stade du Pairay; Attendance: 1,230; Referee: (Belgium) Ruben Calluy

16 August 2025 2	Beerschot	1–1	Eupen	Antwerp
21:00 CEST	Weymans (yellow card) 32'; Bas Van den Eynden 56' (yellow card) 78'; van La Parra (yellow card) 72'	Report	Atteri (yellow card) 22'; Delaurier-Chaubet 30'; Isaac Nuhu (yellow card) 45'; Lorenzo Youndje (yellow card) 54'	Stadium: Olympisch Stadion; Attendance: 3,647; Referee: (Belgium) Michiel Allaerts

22 August 2025 3	Jong Gent U23	1–1	Beerschot	Ghent
20:00	Soumah 72'		Van den Eynden 85'	Stadium: Planet Group Arena; Referee: Klass Clerkx

30 August 2025 4	Beerschot	1–0	Lierse	Antwerp
16:00	Van La Parra 41'			Stadium: Olympisch Stadion; Referee: Anthony Letellier

12 September 2025 5	RSCA Futures	0–2	Beerschot	Brussels
20:00	Jayden Onia Seke (yellow card) 7'; Babatunde Akomolede (yellow card) 81'	Report	Jordanov (yellow card) 17'; Van Eenoo (yellow card) 28'; Haraguchi (yellow card) 38'; Sabri Guendouz 72'; van La Parra 84'	Stadium: Constant Vanden Stock Stadium; Attendance: 648; Referee: (Belgium) Anaik Jacoby

20 September 2025 6	Beerschot	4–1	Francs Borains	Antwerp
20:00	Claes 24'; Jordanov 54'; Haraguchi (yellow card) 57'; Arnold Vula 70' (yellow card) 80'; van La Parra 74'	Report	Mituljikić (yellow card) 18'; Bastian (yellow card) 35'; Dewaest (yellow card) 43'; Corentyn Lavie (yellow card) 47'; Bruno (yellow card) 69'; Jasper Van Oudenhove 90'	Stadium: Olympisch Stadion; Attendance: 3,854; Referee: (Belgium) Tom Stevens

23 September 2025 7	Genk U23	0–2	Beerschot	Genk
20:00	Pierre (yellow card) 43'	Report	Arnold Vula 18'; Van Eenoo 71'	Stadium: Cegeka Arena; Attendance: 402; Referee: (Belgium) Jasper Vitse

27 September 2025 8	Beerschot	1–0	Lokeren	Antwerp
20:00	Andres Labie (yellow card) 75'; Claes (yellow card) 85'; Van Eenoo 86' (pen.)	Report	Boonen (yellow card) 70'; Toon Janssen (yellow card) 85'	Stadium: Olympisch Stadion; Attendance: 5,100; Referee: (Belgium) Clay Ruperti

=== Belgian Cup ===
5 September 2025 Sixth round	Virton	0–1	Beerschot	Virton
20:30			Vargas 13'	Stadium: Stade Yvan Georges

30 October 2025 Round of 16	Beerschot	v	Westerlo
20:30
