= 2024–25 K Beerschot VA season =

K Beerschot VA
2024–25 season
- Manager: Dirk Kuyt
- Stadium: Olympisch Stadion
- Belgian Pro League: 16th
- Belgian Cup: Quarter-finals
- Top goalscorer: League: Marwan Al-Sahafi (5); All: Marwan Al-Sahafi (5)
- Highest home attendance: 9,545 vs Kortrijk
- Lowest home attendance: 4,312 vs Sint-Truiden
- Biggest win: Beerschot 3–1 RFC Liège
- Biggest defeat: Antwerp 5–0 Beerschot
- All statistics correct as of 9 January 2025.

The 2024–25 season is the 125th season for K Beerschot VA and its first season back in the Belgian Pro League. The club is also competing in the Belgian Cup.

== Transfers ==
=== In ===
Pos.	Player	Transferred from	Fee	Date	Source
DF	(Netherlands) Brian Plat	(Netherlands) FC Volendam	Free	1 July 2024	
MF	(Netherlands) Dean Huiberts	(Netherlands) PEC Zwolle	Undisclosed	15 July 2024	
MF	(Scotland) Ewan Henderson	(Scotland) Hibernian	Undisclosed	17 July 2024	
FW	(England) D'Margio Wright-Phillips	(England) Stoke City	Free	18 July 2024	
GK	(Belgium) Nick Shinton	(Belgium) Club Brugge	Undisclosed	23 July 2024	
DF	(Curaçao) Ar'jany Martha	(Netherlands) Jong Ajax	Free	31 July 2024	
MF	(Belgium) Antoine Colassin	(Belgium) Anderlecht	Undisclosed	30 August 2024	
MF	(Saudi Arabia) Faisal Al-Ghamdi	(Saudi Arabia) Ittihad	Loan	1 September 2024	
FW	(Saudi Arabia) Marwan Al-Sahafi	(Saudi Arabia) Ittihad	Loan	1 September 2024	
DF	(France) Colin Dagba	(France) Paris Saint-Germain	Free	5 September 2024	
DF	(Egypt) Omar Fayed	(Turkey) Fenerbahçe	Loan	6 September 2024	
FW	(Germany) Florian Krüger	(Netherlands) Groningen	Undisclosed	6 September 2024	
MF	(Rwanda) Hakim Sahabo	(Belgium) Standard Liège	Loan	9 January 2025	

=== Out ===
Pos.	Player	Transferred to	Fee	Date	Source
DF	(Belgium) Robbe Quirynen	(Belgium) RWDM	Free	1 July 2024	
GK	(Belgium) Bill Lathouwers	(Belgium) KFC Dessel Sport	Free	1 July 2024	
MF	(Belgium) Mardochee Nzita	(Belgium) Charleroi	Undisclosed	1 July 2024	
MF	(Belgium) Benjamin Pauwels	(Netherlands) SC Cambuur	Undisclosed	1 July 2024	
MF	(Belgium) Axl Van Himbeeck	(Netherlands) Helmond Sport	Loan	14 August 2024	
MF	(Belgium) Andi Koshi	(Kosovo) FC Suhareka	Free	14 August 2024	
MF	(Cameroon) Simion Michez	(Czech Republic) Slavia Prague	€2,200,000	3 September 2024	
FW	(Belgium) Aaron Osei Bonsu	(United Arab Emirates) Al Dhafra	Free	12 September 2024	
DF	(Belgium) Hervé Matthys	(Poland) Motor Lublin	Undisclosed	17 January 2025	

== Pre-season and friendlies ==
29 June 2024 Friendly	Beerschot (Belgium)	1–2	(Belgium) Mechelen
16:00 UTC+2

3 July 2024 Friendly	AEK Athens (Greece)	3–0	(Belgium) Beerschot
13:00 UTC+2

19 July 2024 Friendly	Beerschot (Belgium)	3–1	(Greece) OFI
20:30 UTC+2

5 September 2024 Friendly	Belgium U21	5–1	(Belgium) Beerschot
16:00 UTC+2

11 October 2024 Friendly	RWDM (Belgium)	2–2	(Belgium) Beerschot
12:00 UTC+2

== Competitions ==
=== Overall record ===
Competition	First match	Last match	Starting round	Final position	Record							
Competition	First match	Last match	Starting round	Final position	Pld	W	D	L	GF	GA	GD	Win %
Belgian Pro League regular season	27 July 2024	14–16 March 2025	Matchday 1		20	2	6	12	16	40	−24	10.00
Belgian Cup	30 October 2024	9 January 2025	Seventh round	Quarter-finals	3	1	1	1	5	4	+1	33.33
Total					23	3	7	13	21	44	−23	13.04

Last updated: 9 January 2025
Source: Competitions

=== Belgian Pro League ===
==== Regular season ====
Pos	Team	Pld	W	D	L	GF	GA	GD	Pts	Qualification or relegation
12	Dender EH	30	8	8	14	33	51	−18	32	Qualification for the Europe play-offs
13	Cercle Brugge	30	7	11	12	29	44	−15	32	Qualification for the Relegation play-offs
14	Sint-Truiden	30	7	10	13	41	56	−15	31	Qualification for the Relegation play-offs
15	Kortrijk	30	7	5	18	28	55	−27	26	Qualification for the Relegation play-offs
16	Beerschot	30	3	9	18	26	60	−34	18	Qualification for the Relegation play-offs

Source: Jupiler Pro League (in Dutch), Soccerway
Rules for classification: 1) Points; 2) Matches won; 3) Goal difference; 4) Goals scored; 5) Away matches won; 6) Away goal difference; 7) Away goals scored; 8) Play-off.

==== Results summary ====
Overall								Home						Away					
Pld	W	D	L	GF	GA	GD	Pts	W	D	L	GF	GA	GD	W	D	L	GF	GA	GD
20	2	6	12	18	42	−24	12	2	5	3	13	16	−3	0	1	9	5	26	−21

Last updated: 26 December 2024.

==== Results by round ====
Round	1	2	3	4	5	6	7	8	9	10	11	12	13	14	15	16	17	18	19	20	21
Ground	H	A	H	H	A	H	A	H	A	A	H	A	H	H	A	H	A	H	H	A	H
Result	D	L	L	L	L	L	L	L	L	D	W	L	D	D	L	W	L	D	D	L	
Position	7	13	15	15	16	16	16	16	16	16	16	16	16	16	16	16	16	16	16	16	

Updated to match(es) played on 26 December 2024. Source:
A = Away; H = Home; W = Win; D = Draw; L = Loss

==== Matches ====
The match schedule was released on 11 June 2024.

27 July 2024 1	Beerschot	0–0	OH Leuven	Antwerp
18:15 UTC+1				Stadium: Olympisch Stadion; Attendance: 4,687; Referee: Bert Put

2 August 2024 2	Union Saint-Gilloise	3–1	Beerschot	Forest
20:45 UTC+1	Eckert 2'; Mac Allister 42'; Puertas 83'		Keita 48'	Stadium: Joseph Marien Stadium; Attendance: 7,087; Referee: Nicolas Laforge

11 August 2024 3	Cercle Brugge	4–1	Beerschot	Bruges
19:15 UTC+1				Stadium: Jan Breydel Stadium

17 August 2024 4	Beerschot	3–4	Genk	Antwerp
16:00 UTC+1				Stadium: Olympisch Stadion; Attendance: 4,963; Referee: Wim Smet

25 August 2024 5	Standard Liège	1–0	Beerschot	Liège
18:30 UTC+1				Stadium: Stade Maurice Dufrasne

31 August 2024 6	Beerschot	1–2	Dender	Antwerp
18:15 UTC+1				Stadium: Olympisch Stadion; Attendance: 4,882; Referee: Wesli De Cremer

15 September 2024 7	Charleroi	3–0	Beerschot	Charleroi
18:30 UTC+1				Stadium: Stade du Pays de Charleroi; Referee: Michiel Allaerts

21 September 2024 8	Beerschot	0–3	Sint-Truiden	Antwerp
16:00 UTC+1				Stadium: Olympisch Stadion; Attendance: 4,312; Referee: Bram van Driessche

29 September 2024 9	Antwerp	5–0	Beerschot	Antwerp
13:30 UTC+1	Ondrejka 28'; Chery 58', 61'; Janssen 62'			Stadium: Bosuilstadion; Referee: Lothar D'hondt
Note: The match was abandoned in the 75th minute with the score at 4–0 due to spectators throwing flares onto the pitch. The game was scheduled to resume behind closed doors the following day, but Beerschot refused. Consequently, they were deemed to have forfeited the match with a 5–0 result awarded to the opposing team.

4 October 2024 10	Westerlo	2–2	Beerschot	Westerlo
20:45 UTC+1				Stadium: Het Kuipje; Referee: Kevin Van Damme

18 October 2024 11	Beerschot	2–1	Anderlecht	Antwerp
20:45 UTC+1	Al-Sahafi 30', 70', (yellow card) 90+2'; Dagba (yellow card) 48'; Plat (yellow card) 51'; Kosiah (yellow card) 86'		Dolberg 50' (pen.)	Stadium: Olympisch Stadion; Attendance: 7,093; Referee: Simon Bourdeaud'Hui

25 October 2024 12	Kortrijk	1–0	Beerschot	Kortrijk
20:45 UTC+1	Sissako 62'			Stadium: Guldensporen Stadion; Referee: Lawrence Visser

3 November 2024 13	Beerschot	0–0	Gent	Antwerp
19:15 UTC+1				Stadium: Olympisch Stadion; Attendance: 4,844; Referee: Wesli De Cremer

10 November 2024 14	Beerschot	2–2	Club Brugge	Antwerp
19:15 UTC+1	Al-Sahafi 53', 55'		Vermant 3'; Seys 14'	Stadium: Olympisch Stadion; Attendance: 6,822; Referee: Bram van Driessche

24 November 2024 15	Mechelen	3–0	Beerschot	Mechelen
13:30 UTC+1	Touba 41'; Raman 71'; Pflücke 90+2'			Stadium: Achter de Kazerne; Attendance: 15,134; Referee: Lawrence Visser

1 December 2024 16	Beerschot	3–2	Cercle Brugge	Antwerp
16:00 UTC+1	Fayed (yellow card) 45+4'; Dagba (yellow card) 52'; Henderson 54'; Verlinden (yellow card) 65'; Al-Ghamdi (penalty missed) 81'; Mbe Soh 81'; Colassin 88'		Kakou (yellow card) 23'; Denkey 36', 45+3' (pen.), (yellow card) 71'; Utkus (red card) 79'	Stadium: Olympisch Stadion; Attendance: 4,375; Referee: Kevin Van Damme

8 December 2024 17	Anderlecht	2–1	Beerschot	Anderlecht
18:30 UTC+1	Verschaeren 45+7'; Dreyer 90+3'		Al-Sahafi 7'	Stadium: Lotto Park; Referee: Erik Lambrechts

14 December 2024 18	Beerschot	0–0	Standard Liège	Antwerp
16:00 UTC+1				Stadium: Olympisch Stadion; Attendance: 5,096; Referee: Nathan Verboomen

21 December 2024 19	Beerschot	2–2	Kortrijk	Antwerp
20:45 UTC+1	Reyners (yellow card) 43'; Colassin 55'; Verlinden 62', (yellow card) 90'; Weymans (yellow card) 88'		Messaoudi (yellow card) 45'; Sissako 49'; Ferri (yellow card) 52', (goal) 83'	Stadium: Olympisch Stadion; Attendance: 9,545; Referee: Nicolas Laforge

27 December 2024 20	OH Leuven	2–0	Beerschot	Leuven
18:30 UTC+1	Ikwuemesi 76', 86'			Stadium: Den Dreef; Referee: Bert Put

12 January 2025 21	Beerschot	1–1	Antwerp	Antwerp
13:30 UTC+1	Verlinden 1'		Chery 59'	Stadium: Olympisch Stadion

18 January 2025 22	Club Brugge	4–2	Beerschot	Bruges
20:45 UTC+1				Stadium: Jan Breydel Stadium

9 February 2025 25	Beerchot	1–1	Charleroi

16 February 2025 26	Gent	3–2	Beerschot

22 February 2025 27	Dender	0–0	Beerschot

2 March 2025 28	Beerschot	1–0	Mechelen

7 March 2025 29	Sint-Truiden	2–0	Beerschot

16 March 2025 30	Beerchot	1–2	Westerlo

==== Relegation play-offs ====
Pos	Team	Pld	W	D	L	GF	GA	GD	Pts	Qualification or relegation	STR	CER	KOR	BEE
1	Sint-Truiden	6	3	1	2	9	10	−1	41			3–1	0–3	2–1
2	Cercle Brugge (O)	6	2	1	3	10	13	−3	39	Qualification for the promotion/relegation play-offs	3–1		0–2	2–1
3	Kortrijk (R)	6	3	2	1	12	8	+4	37	Relegation to Challenger Pro League	2–2	2–2		3–2
4	Beerschot (R)	6	2	0	4	10	10	0	24	Relegation to Challenger Pro League	0–1	4–2	2–0	

Source: Jupiler Pro League (in Dutch), Soccerway
Legend: Blue = home team win; Yellow = draw; Red = away team win.
Rules for classification: 1) Points; 2) Regular season finishing position.
(O) Play-off winners; (R) Relegated

29 March 2025 1	Beerschot	0–1	Sint-Truiden

5 April 2025 2	Cercle Brugge	2–1	Beerschot

12 April 2025 3	Kortrijk	3–2	Beerschot

25 April 2025 4	Beerschot	2–0	Kortrijk

4 May 2025 5	Sint-Truiden	2–1	Beerschot

10 May 2025 6	Beerschot	4–2	Cercle Brugge

=== Belgian Cup ===
30 October 2024 Seventh round	Beerschot	3–1	RFC Liège	Antwerp
20:00 UTC+1	Colassin 10'; Verlinden 56'; Keita 58'		Arslan 62'	Stadium: Olympisch Stadion; Referee: Klass Clerkx

4 December 2024 Round of 16	Beerschot	2–2 (a.e.t.) (4–3 p)	Mechelen	Antwerp
20:30 UTC+1	Cagro (yellow card) 39'; Colassin 88'; Konstantopoulos 110'		Ouattara (yellow card) 67' (yellow-red card) 117'; Hairemans 75', (yellow card) 77'; Raemaekers (yellow card) 109'; Bafdili 118'	Stadium: Olympisch Stadion; Referee: Jan Boterberg
	Penalties
	Henderson (penalty scored); Reyners (penalty scored); Dagba (penalty missed); Kosiah (penalty scored); Al-Ghamdi (penalty scored)		(penalty missed) Pflücke; (penalty scored) Raemaekers; (penalty missed) Bafdili; (penalty scored) Van den Eynden; (penalty scored) Touba

9 January 2025 Quarter-finals	Beerschot	0–1	Anderlecht	Antwerp
20:30 UTC+1	Konstantopoulos (yellow card) 19'; Mbe Soh (yellow card) 45'; Verlinden (yellow card) 85'; Plat (yellow card) 90+5'		Simić 2'; Rits (yellow card) 21'; Amuzu (yellow card) 84'	Stadium: Olympisch Stadion; Referee: Bram Van Driessche

== Statistics ==
=== Goalscorers ===
As of match played 12 January 2025

Rank	Pos.	No.	Nat.	Player	Pro League	Play-offs	Belgian Cup	Total
1	MF	17	(Saudi Arabia)	Marwan Al-Sahafi	5	0	0	5
2	MF	25	(Belgium)	Antoine Colassin	2	0	2	4
3	FW	10	(Belgium)	Thibaud Verlinden	2	0	1	3
4	MF	8	(Scotland)	Ewan Henderson	2	0	0	2
4	FW	27	(France)	Charly Keita	1	0	1	2
4	MF	75	(Cameroon)	Simion Michez	2	0	0	2
Own goals					0	0	0	0
Totals					17	0	5	22
