= 2022–23 Nottingham Forest F.C. season =

English football club season

Nottingham Forest
2022–23 season
- Owner: Evangelos Marinakis
- Chairman: Nicholas Randall KC
- Manager: Steve Cooper
- Stadium: City Ground
- Premier League: 16th
- FA Cup: Third round
- EFL Cup: Semi-finals
- Top goalscorer: League: Taiwo Awoniyi (10); All: Taiwo Awoniyi (11)
- Highest home attendance: 29,514 vs Arsenal (20 May 2023, Premier League)
- Lowest home attendance: 28,384 vs Tottenham Hotspur (9 September 2022, EFL Cup)
- Average home league attendance: 29,188
- Biggest win: 3–0 vs Grimsby Town; 23 August 2022 (EFL Cup); 4–1 vs Blackburn Rovers; 21 December 2022 (EFL Cup)
- Biggest defeat: 0–6 vs Manchester City; 31 August 2022 (Premier League)
Home colours	Away colours	Third colours

The 2022–23 season was the 157th season in the existence of Nottingham Forest Football Club and their first season back in the top flight of English football since 1998–99. In addition to the Premier League, Forest participated in this season's editions of the FA Cup and the EFL Cup.

On 20 May 2023, Nottingham Forest sealed their Premier League status for the following season with a 1–0 home victory over second-placed Arsenal.

== Coaching team ==
Position	Name
Head coach	(Wales) Steve Cooper
Assistant coaches	(England) Steve Rands
Assistant coaches	(Republic of Ireland) Andy Reid
Assistant coaches	(England) Alan Tate
Goalkeeping coach	(England) Danny Alcock

== Players ==
As of 28 May 2023

No.	Player	Nationality	Date of birth (age)	Previous club	Joined first team	Contract expires	Apps	Goals
Goalkeepers
1	Dean Henderson	(England)	12 March 1997 (aged 26)	(England) Manchester United	2022	2023	20	0
12	Keylor Navas	(Costa Rica)	15 December 1986 (aged 36)	(France) Paris Saint-Germain	2023	2023	17	0
13	Wayne Hennessey	(Wales)	24 January 1987 (aged 36)	(England) Burnley	2022	2024	9	0
Defenders
2	Giulian Biancone	(France)	31 March 2000 (aged 23)	(France) Troyes	2022	2025	3	0
3	Steve Cook	(England)	19 April 1991 (aged 32)	(England) Bournemouth	2022	2024	34	0
4	Joe Worrall (captain)	(England)	10 January 1997 (aged 26)	Academy	2016	2024	217	5
7	Neco Williams	(Wales)	13 April 2001 (aged 22)	(England) Liverpool	2022	2026	36	1
15	Harry Toffolo	(England)	19 August 1995 (aged 27)	(England) Huddersfield Town	2022	2026	21	0
19	Moussa Niakhaté	(Senegal)	8 March 1996 (aged 27)	(Germany) Mainz 05	2022	2025	14	0
24	Serge Aurier	(Ivory Coast)	24 December 1992 (aged 30)	(Spain) Villarreal	2022	2023	28	1
26	Scott McKenna	(Scotland)	12 November 1996 (aged 26)	(Scotland) Aberdeen	2020	2024	136	5
27	Omar Richards	(England)	15 February 1998 (aged 25)	(Germany) Bayern Munich	2022	2026	0	0
30	Willy Boly	(Ivory Coast)	3 February 1991 (aged 32)	(England) Wolverhampton Wanderers	2022	2024	15	1
32	Renan Lodi	(Brazil)	8 April 1998 (aged 25)	(Spain) Atlético Madrid	2022	2023	32	1
38	Felipe	(Brazil)	16 May 1989 (aged 34)	(Spain) Atlético Madrid	2023	2024	16	0
Midfielders
5	Orel Mangala	(Belgium)	18 March 1998 (aged 25)	(Germany) VfB Stuttgart	2022	2026	31	1
6	Jonjo Shelvey	(England)	27 February 1992 (aged 31)	(England) Newcastle United	2023	2025	8	0
8	Jack Colback	(England)	24 October 1989 (aged 33)	(England) Newcastle United	2020	2023	134	8
10	Morgan Gibbs-White	(England)	27 January 2000 (aged 23)	(England) Wolverhampton Wanderers	2022	2027	38	5
11	Jesse Lingard	(England)	15 December 1992 (aged 30)	(England) Manchester United	2022	2023	20	2
18	Cafú	(Portugal)	26 February 1993 (aged 30)	(Greece) Olympiacos	2020	2023	55	1
21	Cheikhou Kouyaté	(Senegal)	21 December 1989 (aged 33)	(England) Crystal Palace	2022	2024	22	1
22	Ryan Yates (vice-captain)	(England)	21 November 1997 (aged 25)	Academy	2016	2025	163	17
23	Remo Freuler	(Switzerland)	15 April 1992 (aged 31)	(Italy) Atalanta	2022	2025	33	0
28	Danilo	(Brazil)	19 April 2001 (aged 22)	(Brazil) Palmeiras	2023	2029	15	3
31	Gustavo Scarpa	(Brazil)	5 January 1994 (aged 29)	(Brazil) Palmeiras	2023	2026	10	0
Forwards
9	Taiwo Awoniyi	(Nigeria)	12 August 1997 (aged 25)	(Germany) Union Berlin	2022	2027	30	11
16	Sam Surridge	(England)	28 July 1998 (aged 24)	(England) Stoke City	2022	2024	50	11
17	Alex Mighten	(England)	11 April 2002 (aged 21)	Academy	2019	2025	67	4
20	Brennan Johnson	(Wales)	23 May 2001 (aged 22)	Academy	2019	2026	105	29
25	Emmanuel Dennis	(Nigeria)	15 November 1997 (aged 25)	(England) Watford	2022	2026	25	2
33	Lyle Taylor	(Montserrat)	29 March 1990 (aged 33)	(England) Charlton Athletic	2020	2023	57	7
34	André Ayew	(Ghana)	17 December 1989 (aged 33)	(Qatar) Al Sadd	2023	2023	13	0
39	Chris Wood	(New Zealand)	7 December 1991 (aged 31)	(England) Newcastle United	2023	2023	7	1

== Transfers ==
=== In ===
==== Transfers in ====
Date	Position	Nationality	Player	From	Fee	Team	Ref.
20 June 2022	GK	(England)	Ryan Hammond	(England) Millwall	Free transfer	Under-23s	
25 June 2022	FW	(Nigeria)	Taiwo Awoniyi	(Germany) Union Berlin	Undisclosed (Note: Fee reported as £17,000,000)	First team	
3 July 2022	DF	(France)	Giulian Biancone	(France) Troyes	Undisclosed (Note: Fee reported as £5,000,000)	First team	
4 July 2022	MF	(Northern Ireland)	Joel Thompson	(Northern Ireland) Crusaders	Undisclosed	Under-23s	
6 July 2022	DF	(Senegal)	Moussa Niakhaté	(Germany) Mainz 05	Undisclosed (Note: Fee reported as £8,500,000 plus add-ons)	First team	
10 July 2022	DF	(England)	Omar Richards	(Germany) Bayern Munich	Undisclosed (Note: Fee reported to be between £7,200,000 and £10,000,000)	First team	
11 July 2022	DF	(Wales)	Neco Williams	(England) Liverpool	Undisclosed (Note: Fee reported as £17,000,000 plus add-ons)	First team	
15 July 2022	GK	(Wales)	Wayne Hennessey	(England) Burnley	Undisclosed	First team	
17 July 2022	MF	(Costa Rica)	Brandon Aguilera	(Costa Rica) Alajuelense	Undisclosed	Under-23s	
20 July 2022	DF	(England)	Harry Toffolo	(England) Huddersfield Town	Undisclosed	First team	
20 July 2022	MF	(England)	Lewis O'Brien	(England) Huddersfield Town	Undisclosed	First team	
21 July 2022	MF	(England)	Jesse Lingard	(England) Manchester United	Free transfer	First team	
31 July 2022	MF	(Belgium)	Orel Mangala	(Germany) VfB Stuttgart	Undisclosed (Note: Fee reported as £12,700,000)	First team	
13 August 2022	FW	(Nigeria)	Emmanuel Dennis	(England) Watford	Undisclosed (Note: Fee reported to be between £10,000,000 and £20,000,000)	First team	
13 August 2022	MF	(Senegal)	Cheikhou Kouyaté	Unattached (Note: Released by Crystal Palace on 1 July 2022)	Free transfer	First team	
14 August 2022	MF	(Switzerland)	Remo Freuler	(Italy) Atalanta	Undisclosed (Note: Fee reported as £7,600,000 plus add-ons)	First team	
19 August 2022	MF	(England)	Morgan Gibbs-White	(England) Wolverhampton Wanderers	Undisclosed (Note: Fee reported as £25,000,000 plus add-ons)	First team	
26 August 2022	FW	(South Korea)	Hwang Ui-jo	(France) Bordeaux	Undisclosed	First team	
1 September 2022	DF	(Ivory Coast)	Willy Boly	(England) Wolverhampton Wanderers	Undisclosed (Note: Fee reported as £4,650,000 plus add-ons)	First team	
1 September 2022	RW	(England)	Josh Bowler	(England) Blackpool	Undisclosed	First team	
7 September 2022	DF	(Ivory Coast)	Serge Aurier	Unattached (Note: Released by Villarreal on 1 July 2022)	Free transfer	First team	
20 September 2022	GK	(Bosnia and Herzegovina)	Adnan Kanurić	Unattached (Note: Released by Sarajevo on 1 July 2022)	Free transfer	First team	
1 January 2023	MF	(Brazil)	Gustavo Scarpa	Unattached (Note: Released by Palmeiras on 1 January 2023)	Free transfer	First team	
16 January 2023	DM	(Brazil)	Danilo	(Brazil) Palmeiras	Undisclosed (Note: Fee reported as £16,000,000)	First team	
31 January 2023	DF	(Brazil)	Felipe	(Spain) Atlético Madrid	Undisclosed	First team	
31 January 2023	MF	(England)	Jonjo Shelvey	(England) Newcastle United	Undisclosed	First team	
2 February 2023	FW	(Ghana)	André Ayew	Unattached (Note: Released by Al Sadd on 29 January 2023)	Free transfer	First team	

==== Loans in ====
Date from	Position	Nationality	Player	From	Duration	Team	Ref.
2 July 2022	GK	(England)	Dean Henderson	(England) Manchester United	End of season	First team	
29 August 2022	DF	(Brazil)	Renan Lodi	(Spain) Atlético Madrid	End of season	First team	
1 September 2022	DF	(France)	Loïc Badé	(France) Rennes	3 January 2023	First team	
20 January 2023	FW	(New Zealand)	Chris Wood	(England) Newcastle United	End of season	First team	
31 January 2023	GK	(Costa Rica)	Keylor Navas	(France) Paris Saint-Germain	End of season	First team	

=== Out ===
==== Transfers out ====
Date	Position	Nationality	Player	To	Fee	Team	Ref.
18 May 2022	DF	(Albania)	Rezart Rama	(Canada) Forge FC	Released	Under-23s	
20 June 2022	DF	(England)	Jayden Richardson	(Scotland) Aberdeen	Undisclosed (Note: Fee reported as £300,000)	Under-23s	
1 July 2022	MF	(England)	Josh Barnes	(England) Basford United	Released	Under-23s	
1 July 2022	DF	(Cameroon)	Gaëtan Bong	Free agent	Released	First team	
1 July 2022	DF	(Portugal)	Baba Fernandes	(England) Accrington Stanley	Released	Under-23s	
1 July 2022	DF	(Portugal)	Tobias Figueiredo	(England) Hull City	Released	First team	
1 July 2022	FW	(England)	Lewis Grabban	(Saudi Arabia) Al-Ahli	Released	First team	
1 July 2022	DF	(England)	Carl Jenkinson	(Australia) Newcastle Jets	Released	First team	
1 July 2022	DF	(England)	Sam Sanders	(England) York City	Released	Under-23s	
1 July 2022	MF	(Guatemala)	Marcelo Saraiva	(Guatemala) Antigua	Released	Under-23s	
1 July 2022	DF	(Wales)	Morgan Thomas-Sadler	(Wales) Denbigh Town	Released	Under-23s	
1 July 2022	GK	(England)	Joe Watkins	Free agent	Released	Under-23s	
5 July 2022	GK	(France)	Brice Samba	(France) Lens	Undisclosed	First team	
27 July 2022	DF	(Cyprus)	Nicholas Ioannou	(Italy) Como	Undisclosed	First team	
2 August 2022	FW	(Portugal)	Xande Silva	(France) Dijon	Undisclosed	First team	
5 August 2022	FW	(Cape Verde)	Nuno da Costa	(France) Auxerre	Undisclosed	First team	
15 August 2022	FW	(England)	Joe Lolley	(Australia) Sydney FC	Undisclosed	First team	

==== Loans out ====
Date from	Position	Nationality	Player	To	Duration	Team	Ref.
17 June 2022	DF	(Tunisia)	Mohamed Dräger	(Switzerland) Luzern	End of season	First team	
2 July 2022	GK	(United States)	Ethan Horvath	(England) Luton Town	End of season	First team	
8 July 2022	MF	(England)	Tyrese Fornah	(England) Reading	End of season	First team	
9 July 2022	FW	(England)	Will Swan	(England) Mansfield Town	End of season	Under-23s	
13 July 2022	DF	(England)	Jonathan Panzo	(England) Coventry City	End of season	First team	
14 July 2022	DF	(England)	Fin Back	(England) Carlisle United	End of season	Under-23s	
16 July 2022	DF	(England)	Riley Harbottle	(England) Mansfield Town	End of season	Under-23s	
17 July 2022	MF	(Costa Rica)	Brandon Aguilera	(Costa Rica) Guanacasteca	Six months	Under-23s	
4 August 2022	MF	(Paraguay)	Braian Ojeda	(United States) Real Salt Lake	End of season	First team	
5 August 2022	DF	(Canada)	Richie Laryea	(Canada) Toronto FC	End of season	First team	
12 August 2022	GK	(Scotland)	Nicky Hogarth	(Scotland) Falkirk	3 January 2023	Under-23s	
26 August 2022	FW	(South Korea)	Hwang Ui-jo	(Greece) Olympiacos	5 February 2023 (Note: On 5 February, Hwang was recalled from his season-long loan at Olympiacos and was subsequently loaned to FC Seoul.)	First team	
29 August 2022	FW	(England)	Alex Mighten	(England) Sheffield Wednesday	10 January 2023 (Note: On 10 January, Mighten was recalled from his season-long loan at Sheffield Wednesday.)	First team	
1 September 2022	RW	(England)	Josh Bowler	(Greece) Olympiacos	5 January 2023 (Note: On 5 January, Bowler was recalled from his season-long loan at Olympiacos and was subsequently loaned to Blackpool.)	First team	
5 January 2023	RW	(England)	Josh Bowler	(England) Blackpool	End of season	First team	
13 January 2023	FW	(England)	Lewis Salmon	(England) AFC Telford United	End of season	Under-23s	
20 January 2023	FW	(Northern Ireland)	Dale Taylor	(England) Burton Albion	End of season	Under-23s	
23 January 2023	DF	(France)	Loïc Mbe Soh	(France) Guingamp	End of season	First team	
23 January 2023	DF	(Northern Ireland)	Aaron Donnelly	(England) Port Vale	End of season	Under-23s	
30 January 2023	MF	(France)	Ateef Konaté	(England) Oxford United	End of season	Under-23s	
31 January 2023	MF	(Costa Rica)	Brandon Aguilera	(Portugal) Estoril	End of season	Under-23s	
1 February 2023	GK	(England)	Jordan Smith	(England) Huddersfield Town	End of season	First team	
2 February 2023	MF	(England)	Billy Fewster	(England) Scunthorpe United	End of season	Under-23s	
4 February 2023	GK	(Bosnia and Herzegovina)	Adnan Kanurić	(England) Oxford City	End of season	First team	
5 February 2023	CF	(South Korea)	Hwang Ui-jo	(South Korea) FC Seoul	End of season	First team	
20 March 2023	MF	(England)	Lewis O'Brien	(United States) D.C. United	End of season	First team	

=== New contracts ===
Date	Position	Nationality	Player	Contract length	Team	Ref.
20 June 2022	DF	(England)	Riley Harbottle	Two years	Under-23s	
1 July 2022	FW	(Wales)	Brennan Johnson	Four years	First team	
4 July 2022	FW	(Northern Ireland)	Dale Taylor	Three years	Under-23s	
7 July 2022	DF	(England)	Pharrell Johnson	Two years	Under-18s	
7 December 2022	DF	(Northern Ireland)	Aaron Donnelly		Under-23s	
7 December 2022	MF	(Northern Ireland)	Jamie McDonnell		Under-23s	
16 May 2023	GK	(England)	George Shelvey	One year	Under-23s	

== Pre-season and friendlies ==
On 27 June, Forest announced their pre-season schedule. Two further friendlies were added, against Notts County and Valencia.

During the winter break, Nottingham Forest would face Stoke City.

8 July 2022 Friendly	Coventry City	3–1	Nottingham Forest	San Pedro del Pinatar, Spain
18:30 CEST	Godden 45+4'; Walker 54', 75'	Report	Biancone 40'	Stadium: Pinatar Arena

12 July 2022 Friendly	Burton Albion	0–1	Nottingham Forest	Burton upon Trent
19:00 BST		Report	Cook 56'	Stadium: Pirelli Stadium

16 July 2022 Friendly	Barnsley	0–0	Nottingham Forest	Barnsley
17:30 BST		Report		Stadium: Oakwell

20 July 2022 Friendly	Nottingham Forest	3–1	Hertha BSC	Burton upon Trent
19:00 BST	L. Taylor 9', 20'; Ullrich 84' (o.g.)	Report	Scherhant 45'	Stadium: Pirelli Stadium

23 July 2022 Friendly	Union Berlin	1–0	Nottingham Forest	Köpenick, Germany
17:00 CEST	Pefok 36'	Report		Stadium: Stadion An der Alten Försterei

26 July 2022 Friendly	Notts County	2–2	Nottingham Forest	Nottingham
19:45 BST	Langstaff 49'; Austin 59'	Report	Surridge 43'; Cafú 53'	Stadium: Meadow Lane

30 July 2022 Friendly	Nottingham Forest	1–1	Valencia	Nottingham
18:00 BST	Johnson 83'	Report	Soler 43'	Stadium: Meadow Lane

2 December 2022 Friendly	Nottingham Forest	1–2	Stoke City	Loughborough
19:30 GMT	Gibbs-White 44'		Smallbone (yellow card) 58'; Cook 65' (o.g.); Campbell 77'	Stadium: Loughborough University Stadium

6 December 2022 Friendly	Atromitos	3–2	Nottingham Forest	TBA
15:00 EET	Kuen 12'; Tzovaras 73'; Kotsopoulos 86'	Report	4' (o.g.); Yates 20'	Stadium: TBA; Attendance: 0 (Behind-closed-doors)

10 December 2022 Friendly	Olympiacos	1–0	Nottingham Forest	Piraeus, Greece
19:00 EET	Kasami 39'	Report		Stadium: Karaiskakis Stadium

16 December 2022 Friendly	Valencia (Spain)	1–2	(England) Nottingham Forest	Valencia, Spain
19:30 CET	Duro 58'	Report	Awoniyi 40' Dennis 69'	Stadium: Mestalla

== Competitions ==
=== Overview ===
Competition	First match	Last match	Starting round	Final position	Record							
Competition	First match	Last match	Starting round	Final position	Pld	W	D	L	GF	GA	GD	Win %
Premier League	6 August 2022	28 May 2023	Matchday 1	16th	38	9	11	18	38	68	−30	23.68
FA Cup	7 January 2023		Third round	Third round	1	0	0	1	1	4	−3	0.00
EFL Cup	23 August 2022	1 February 2023	Second round	Semi-finals	6	3	1	2	10	7	+3	50.00
Total					45	12	12	21	49	79	−30	26.67

Source: Soccerway

=== Premier League ===
==== League table ====
Pos	Team	Pld	W	D	L	GF	GA	GD	Pts	Qualification or relegation
14	West Ham United	38	11	7	20	42	55	−13	40	Qualification to Europa League group stage (Note: West Ham United qualified for the Europa League group stage by winning the 2022–23 UEFA Europa Conference League.)
15	Bournemouth	38	11	6	21	37	71	−34	39	
16	Nottingham Forest	38	9	11	18	38	68	−30	38	
17	Everton	38	8	12	18	34	57	−23	36	
18	Leicester City (R)	38	9	7	22	51	68	−17	34	Relegation to EFL Championship

Source: Premier League
Rules for classification: 1) Points; 2) Goal difference; 3) Goals scored; 4) If the champions, relegated teams or qualified teams for UEFA competitions cannot be determined by rules 1 to 3, rules 4.1 to 4.3 are applied – 4.1) Points gained in head-to-head record between such teams; 4.2) Away goals scored in head-to-head record between such teams; 4.3) Play-offs
(R) Relegated

==== Results summary ====
Overall								Home						Away					
Pld	W	D	L	GF	GA	GD	Pts	W	D	L	GF	GA	GD	W	D	L	GF	GA	GD
38	9	11	18	38	68	−30	38	8	6	5	27	24	+3	1	5	13	11	44	−33

Source: Premier League

==== Results by round ====
Round	1	2	3	4	5	6	8	9	10	11	12	13	14	15	16	17	18	19	20	21	22	23	24	25	26	27	28	29	7^{1}	30	31	32	33	34	35	36	37	38
Ground	A	H	A	H	A	H	H	A	H	A	A	H	A	H	H	A	H	A	H	A	H	A	H	A	H	A	H	H	A	A	H	A	H	A	H	A	H	A
Result	L	W	D	L	L	L	L	L	D	L	D	W	L	D	W	L	D	W	W	D	W	L	D	L	D	L	L	D	L	L	L	L	W	L	W	D	W	D
Position	18	10	10	14	15	19	19	20	19	20	20	20	20	20	18	19	18	15	13	13	13	14	13	13	14	14	16	16	17	18	18	19	17	18	16	16	16	16

Source: Premier League
A = Away; H = Home; W = Win; D = Draw; L = Loss; P = Postponed
- ^{1} Matchday 7 (vs. Leeds United) was postponed, alongside all other matches in the Premier League, due to the death of Queen Elizabeth II.

==== Matches ====
The Premier League fixtures were released on 16 June 2022 for the forthcoming season.

6 August 2022 1	Newcastle United	2–0	Nottingham Forest	Newcastle upon Tyne
15:00 BST	Schär 58'; Wilson 78'	Report	Worrall (yellow card) 15'; Williams (yellow card) 23'; O'Brien (yellow card) 56'	Stadium: St James' Park; Attendance: 52,245 (3,209 away); Referee: Simon Hooper

14 August 2022 2	Nottingham Forest	1–0	West Ham United	West Bridgford
14:00 BST	Awoniyi 45+2'; McKenna (yellow card) 64'; Henderson (yellow card) 75'; Johnson (yellow card) 90+8'; Surridge (yellow card) 90+8'	Report	Rice (yellow card) 9', (penalty missed) 65'	Stadium: City Ground; Attendance: 29,281 (2,933 away); Referee: Robert Jones
Note: Live on Sky Sports

20 August 2022 3	Everton	1–1	Nottingham Forest	Walton, Liverpool
15:00 BST	Gordon (yellow card) 21'; Iwobi (yellow card) 35'; Onana (yellow card) 60'; Gray 88'	Report	Worrall (yellow card) 20'; Williams (yellow card) 29'; Johnson 81'	Stadium: Goodison Park; Attendance: 39,271 (2,972 away); Referee: Andre Marriner

28 August 2022 4	Nottingham Forest	0–2	Tottenham Hotspur	West Bridgford
16:30 BST	Cook (yellow card) 56'; Worrall (yellow card) 58'; McKenna (yellow card) 61'; O'Brien (yellow card) 73'; Kouyaté (yellow card) 84'; Johnson (yellow card) 85'	Report	Kane 5', 81', (penalty missed) 56', (yellow card) 83'	Stadium: City Ground; Attendance: 29,296 (2,957 away); Referee: Craig Pawson
Note: Live on Sky Sports

31 August 2022 5	Manchester City	6–0	Nottingham Forest	Manchester
19:30 BST	Haaland 12', 23', 38'; Cancelo 50'; Álvarez 65', 87'	Report	Dennis (yellow card) 76'	Stadium: City of Manchester Stadium; Attendance: 53,409 (3,055 away); Referee: Paul Tierney
Note: Live on BT Sport

3 September 2022 6	Nottingham Forest	2–3	Bournemouth	West Bridgford
15:00 BST	Kouyaté 33'; Johnson 45+2' (pen.); McKenna (yellow card) 45+4'; Lodi (yellow card) 76'	Report	Neto (yellow card) 45+2'; Billing 51'; Solanke 63'; Anthony 87'	Stadium: City Ground; Attendance: 28,720 (2,000 away); Referee: Michael Oliver

16 September 2022 8	Nottingham Forest	2–3	Fulham	West Bridgford
20:00 BST	Awoniyi 11'; Cook (yellow card) 27'; Boly (yellow card) 34'; O'Brien 77'	Report	Diop (yellow card) 40'; Adarabioyo 54'; Palhinha 57', (yellow card) 58'; Reed 60'; Tete (yellow card) 63'; Pereira (yellow card) 79'	Stadium: City Ground; Attendance: 28,654 (1,938 away); Referee: Jarred Gillett

3 October 2022 9	Leicester City	4–0	Nottingham Forest	Leicester
20:00 BST	Maddison 25', 35', (yellow card) 83'; Barnes 27'; Soumaré (yellow card) 71'; Daka 73'	Report	Williams (yellow card) 18'; Kouyaté (yellow card) 33'; Lingard (yellow card) 64'; Cook (yellow card) 90+2'	Stadium: King Power Stadium; Attendance: 32,202 (3,286 away); Referee: Robert Jones

10 October 2022 10	Nottingham Forest	1–1	Aston Villa	West Bridgford
20:00 BST	Dennis 15'; Aurier (yellow card) 18'; Cook (yellow card) 27'; Yates (yellow card) 82'	Report	Young 22'; Konsa (yellow card) 45'; McGinn (yellow card) 50'; Ramsey (yellow card) 75'	Stadium: City Ground; Attendance: 29,208 (2,941 away); Referee: Anthony Taylor

15 October 2022 11	Wolverhampton Wanderers	1–0	Nottingham Forest	Wolverhampton
15:00 BST	Neves 56' (pen.); Podence (yellow card) 80'; Hodge (yellow card) 90+7'	Report	Dennis (yellow card) 16'; McKenna (yellow card) 67'; Johnson (penalty missed) 79'	Stadium: Molineux Stadium; Attendance: 31,554 (2,970 away); Referee: Thomas Bramall

18 October 2022 12	Brighton & Hove Albion	0–0	Nottingham Forest	Falmer
19:30 BST	Caicedo (yellow card) 54'; Mac Allister (yellow card) 78'; Lamptey (yellow card) 90'	Report	Freuler (yellow card) 84'	Stadium: Amex Stadium; Attendance: 31,463 (3,076 away); Referee: Darren England

22 October 2022 13	Nottingham Forest	1–0	Liverpool	West Bridgford
12:30 BST	Awoniyi 55'; Worrall (yellow card) 88'; Freuler (yellow card) 89'	Report	Gomez (yellow card) 54'	Stadium: City Ground; Attendance: 29,245 (2,957 away); Referee: Paul Tierney

30 October 2022 14	Arsenal	5–0	Nottingham Forest	Holloway
14:00 GMT	Martinelli 5'; Nelson 49', 52'; Partey 57'; Ødegaard 78'	Report	Gibbs-White (yellow card) 44'	Stadium: Emirates Stadium; Attendance: 60,263 (3,003 away); Referee: Simon Hooper

5 November 2022 15	Nottingham Forest	2–2	Brentford	West Bridgford
15:00 GMT	Gibbs-White 20'; Yates (yellow card) 34'; Henderson (yellow card) 45+1'; Jørgensen 90+6' (o.g.)	Report	Janelt (yellow card) 31'; Mbeumo 45+3' (pen.) (yellow card) 70'; Wissa 75'	Stadium: City Ground; Attendance: 28,869 (2,948 away); Referee: Andre Marriner

12 November 2022 16	Nottingham Forest	1–0	Crystal Palace	West Bridgford
15:00 GMT	Gibbs-White 54'; Yates (yellow card) 61'	Report	Mitchell (yellow card) 30'; Zaha (penalty missed) 41'; Ward (yellow card) 64'; Guéhi (yellow card) 73'; Schlupp (yellow card) 88'	Stadium: City Ground; Attendance: 29,045 (2,957 away); Referee: John Brooks

27 December 2022 17	Manchester United	3–0	Nottingham Forest	Manchester
20:00 GMT	Rashford 19'; Martial 23'; Malacia (yellow card) 27'; Eriksen (yellow card) 74'; Garnacho (yellow card) 83'; Fred 87'	Report	Mangala (yellow card) 29'	Stadium: Old Trafford; Attendance: 73,608 (3,075 away); Referee: Anthony Taylor

1 January 2023 18	Nottingham Forest	1–1	Chelsea	West Bridgford
16:30 GMT	Yates (yellow card) 43'; Aurier 63'; Lodi (yellow card) 90+3'	Report	Sterling 16'; Azpilicueta (yellow card) 53'; Gallagher (yellow card) 90'	Stadium: City Ground; Attendance: 29,229 (2,956 away); Referee: Peter Bankes

4 January 2023 19	Southampton	0–1	Nottingham Forest	Southampton
19:30 GMT	Perraud (yellow card) 45'; S. Armstrong (yellow card) 89'	Report	Awoniyi 27'; Freuler (yellow card) 42'; Johnson (yellow card) 45'	Stadium: St Mary's Stadium; Attendance: 30,150 (3,196 away); Referee: Thomas Bramall

14 January 2023 20	Nottingham Forest	2–0	Leicester City	West Bridgford
15:00 GMT	Johnson 56', 84', (yellow card) 86'	Report	Tielemans (yellow card) 29'; Amartey (yellow card) 77'	Stadium: City Ground; Attendance: 29,301 (2,953 away); Referee: Paul Tierney

21 January 2023 21	Bournemouth	1–1	Nottingham Forest	Kings Park, Bournemouth
15:00 GMT	Anthony 28'; Kelly (yellow card) 32'	Report	Worrall (yellow card) 36'; Surridge 83'; Scarpa (yellow card) 86'	Stadium: Vitality Stadium; Attendance: 10,248 (1,318 away); Referee: Andrew Madley

5 February 2023 22	Nottingham Forest	1–0	Leeds United	West Bridgford
14:00 GMT	Johnson 14'; Danilo (yellow card) 30'; Boly (yellow card) 52'; Williams (yellow card) 55'; Surridge (yellow card) 90+1'	Report	Struijk (yellow card) 13'; Wöber (yellow card) 77'	Stadium: City Ground; Attendance: 29,363 (2,956 away); Referee: Robert Jones
Note: Live on Sky Sports

11 February 2023 23	Fulham	2–0	Nottingham Forest	Fulham
15:00 GMT	Willian 17'; Solomon 88'	Report	Aurier (yellow card) 15'	Stadium: Craven Cottage; Attendance: 24,244 (2,299 away); Referee: Andrew Madley

18 February 2023 24	Nottingham Forest	1–1	Manchester City	West Bridgford
15:00 GMT	Worrall (yellow card) 14'; Wood 84'	Report	Silva 41'	Stadium: City Ground; Attendance: 29,365 (2,956 away); Referee: Graham Scott

25 February 2023 25	West Ham United	4–0	Nottingham Forest	Stratford
15:00 GMT	Ings 70', 73'; Rice 78'; Antonio 85'	Report		Stadium: London Stadium; Attendance: 62,469 (3,001 away); Referee: Jarred Gillett

5 March 2023 26	Nottingham Forest	2–2	Everton	West Bridgford
14:00 GMT	Johnson 19', 77'; Gibbs-White (yellow card) 51'; Lodi (yellow card) 55'; Felipe (yellow card) 79'	Report	Gray 10' (pen.), (yellow card) 56'; Doucouré 29'; Godfrey (yellow card) 42'; McNeil (yellow card) 52'; Tarkowski (yellow card) 57'; Davies (yellow card) 90+4'	Stadium: City Ground; Attendance: 29,353 (2,955 away); Referee: John Brooks

11 March 2023 27	Tottenham Hotspur	3–1	Nottingham Forest	Tottenham
15:00 GMT	Kane 19', 35' (pen.); Son Heung-min 62'; Skipp (yellow card) 69'; Dier (yellow card) 71'; Højbjerg (yellow card) 90+1'	Report	Lodi (yellow card) 55'; Worrall 81'; Ayew (penalty missed) 90+6'	Stadium: Tottenham Hotspur Stadium; Attendance: 61,460 (3,038 away); Referee: Craig Pawson

17 March 2023 28	Nottingham Forest	1–2	Newcastle United	West Bridgford
20:00 GMT	Dennis (yellow card) 22', (goal) 26'; Gibbs-White (yellow card) 59'; Shelvey (yellow card) 90+2'; Navas (yellow card) 90+3'; Lodi (yellow card) 90+6'	Report	Burn (yellow card) 33'; Isak 45+2', 90+3' (pen.)	Stadium: City Ground; Attendance: 29,362 (2,956 away); Referee: Paul Tierney

1 April 2023 29	Nottingham Forest	1–1	Wolverhampton Wanderers	West Bridgford
15:00 BST	Freuler (yellow card) 35'; Johnson 38', (yellow card) 40'; Toffolo (yellow card) 49'	Report	Neves (yellow card) 42'; Moutinho (yellow card) 45'; Semedo (yellow card) 79'; Podence 83'; Sarabia (yellow card) 85'; Toti (yellow card) 90+3'	Stadium: City Ground; Attendance: 29,368 (2,955 away); Referee: Chris Kavanagh

4 April 2023 7	Leeds United	2–1	Nottingham Forest	Leeds
19:45 BST	Harrison 20'; Sinisterra 45+1'; Summerville (yellow card) 90+1'	Report	Williams (yellow card) 8'; Mangala 12'; Johnson (yellow card) 65'; Felipe (yellow card) 84'; Kouyaté (yellow card) 89'	Stadium: Elland Road; Attendance: 36,740 (2,916 away); Referee: Robert Jones
Note: The match was originally scheduled to be played on 12 September 2022, but was postponed due to the death of Queen Elizabeth II.

8 April 2023 30	Aston Villa	2–0	Nottingham Forest	Aston, Birmingham
15:00 BST	Moreno (yellow card) 35'; Traoré 48'; Konsa (yellow card) 85'; Watkins 90+5', (yellow card) 90+5'	Report	Shelvey (yellow card) 36'; Awoniyi (yellow card) 85'; Mangala (yellow card) 90'; Toffolo (yellow card) 90+1'	Stadium: Villa Park; Attendance: 42,076 (3,005 away); Referee: Anthony Taylor

16 April 2023 31	Nottingham Forest	0–2	Manchester United	West Bridgford
16:30 BST	Williams (yellow card) 67'; Mangala (yellow card) 83'	Report	Maguire (yellow card) 3'; Antony 32'; Dalot 76'; Weghorst (yellow card) 90+3'	Stadium: City Ground; Attendance: 29,435 (2,955 away); Referee: Simon Hooper

22 April 2023 32	Liverpool	3–2	Nottingham Forest	Anfield, Liverpool
15:00 BST	Jota 47', 55'; Salah 70'	Report	Williams 51', (yellow card) 83'; Gibbs-White 67'	Stadium: Anfield; Attendance: 53,325 (2,936 away); Referee: Michael Oliver

26 April 2023 33	Nottingham Forest	3–1	Brighton & Hove Albion	West Bridgford
19:30 BST	Felipe (yellow card) 4'; Johnson (penalty missed) 11'; Groß 45+3' (o.g.); Danilo 69'; Gibbs-White 90+1' (pen.); Navas (yellow card) 90+14'	Report	Buonanotte 38'	Stadium: City Ground; Attendance: 28,808 (2,732 away); Referee: Jarred Gillett

29 April 2023 34	Brentford	2–1	Nottingham Forest	Brentford
15:00 BST	Henry (yellow card) 29'; Toney 82'; Dasilva 90+4'	Report	Felipe (yellow card) 34'; Danilo 45+1'; Ayew (yellow card) 56'	Stadium: Gtech Community Stadium; Attendance: 17,080 (1,725 away); Referee: Peter Bankes

8 May 2023 35	Nottingham Forest	4–3	Southampton	West Bridgford
20:00 BST	Awoniyi 18', 21'; Gibbs-White 44' (pen.); Danilo 73'; Lodi (yellow card) 78'	Report	Alcaraz 25'; Lyanco 51'; Ward-Prowse 90+6' (pen.)	Stadium: City Ground; Attendance: 29,154 (2,682 away); Referee: Michael Oliver

13 May 2023 36	Chelsea	2–2	Nottingham Forest	Fulham
15:00 BST	Sterling 51', 58'; Félix (yellow card) 69'; Thiago Silva (yellow card) 73'; Gallagher (yellow card) 79'	Report	Awoniyi 13', 62'; Lodi (yellow card) 83'	Stadium: Stamford Bridge; Attendance: 40,030 (2,986 away); Referee: Paul Tierney

20 May 2023 37	Nottingham Forest	1–0	Arsenal	West Bridgford
17:30 BST	Awoniyi 19', (yellow card) 25'; Niakhaté (yellow card) 45+2'; Gibbs-White (yellow card) 79'	Report	Gabriel Jesus (yellow card) 54'; Gabriel (yellow card) 78'	Stadium: City Ground; Attendance: 29,514 (2,955 away); Referee: Anthony Taylor

28 May 2023 38	Crystal Palace	1–1	Nottingham Forest	Selhurst
16:30 BST	Hughes 66'	Report	Awoniyi 31'; Gibbs-White (yellow card) 43'; Yates (yellow card) 80'	Stadium: Selhurst Park; Attendance: 25,198 (2,687 away); Referee: Thomas Bramall

=== FA Cup ===
Forest were drawn away to Blackpool in the third round.

7 January 2023 Third round	Blackpool	4–1	Nottingham Forest	Blackpool
15:00 GMT	Ekpiteta 17'; Poveda 64', (yellow card) 64'; Hamilton 71'; Yates 87'	Report	Colback (yellow card) 45'; Johnson (yellow card) 80'; Yates 90+2'	Stadium: Bloomfield Road; Attendance: 8,750; Referee: James Linington

=== EFL Cup ===
Forest entered the competition in the second round and were drawn away to Grimsby Town. Another away tie, against Blackburn Rovers, was drawn in the fourth round. In the quarter-finals, Nottingham Forest would travel to face Wolverhampton Wanderers. In the semi-finals, Nottingham Forest were drawn against Manchester United to play over the two legs, with the first match at the City Ground.

23 August 2022 Second round	Grimsby Town	0–3	Nottingham Forest	Cleethorpes
19:45 BST		Report	Yates 18'; Surridge 35', 77', (yellow card) 70'	Stadium: Blundell Park; Attendance: 8,418; Referee: Seb Stockbridge

9 November 2022 Third round	Nottingham Forest	2–0	Tottenham Hotspur	West Bridgford
19:45 GMT	Lodi 50'; Lingard 57', (yellow card) 64'; Mangala (yellow card) 68' (yellow-red card) 75'	Report	Bissouma (yellow card) 67'; Kulusevski (yellow card) 87'; Dier (yellow card) 90+4'	Stadium: City Ground; Attendance: 28,384; Referee: Peter Bankes

21 December 2022 Fourth round	Blackburn Rovers	1–4	Nottingham Forest	Blackburn
19:45 GMT	Wharton 44', (yellow card) 52'	Report	Johnson 13' (pen.), 90+2'; Lingard 53'; Worrall (yellow card) 55'; Awoniyi 79'; Colback (yellow card) 84'	Stadium: Ewood Park; Attendance: 15,138; Referee: Robert Jones

10 January 2023 Quarter-finals	Nottingham Forest	1–1 (4–3 p)	Wolverhampton Wanderers	West Bridgford
19:45 GMT	Boly 18'; Aurier (yellow card) 88'; Yates (yellow card) 90+4'	Report	Kilman (yellow card) 37'; Jiménez 64'; Neves (yellow card) 74'; Nunes (yellow card) 88'; Podence (yellow card) 88'	Stadium: City Ground; Attendance: 28,656; Referee: Graham Scott
	Penalties
	Surridge (penalty missed); Freuler (penalty scored); Worrall (penalty scored); Gibbs-White (penalty scored); Colback (penalty scored)		(penalty missed) Neves; (penalty scored) Podence; (penalty scored) Nunes; (penalty scored) Cunha; (penalty missed) Hodge

25 January 2023 Semi-finals first leg	Nottingham Forest	0–3	Manchester United	West Bridgford
20:00 GMT		Report	Rashford 6'; Weghorst 45'; Pellistri (yellow card) 84'; Fernandes 89'	Stadium: City Ground; Attendance: 29,325; Referee: Michael Oliver

1 February 2023 Semi-finals second leg	Manchester United	2–0 (5–0 agg.)	Nottingham Forest	Manchester
20:00 GMT	Fred (yellow card) 34', (goal) 76'; Casemiro (yellow card) 68'; Martial 73'	Report	Surridge (yellow card) 45+1'	Stadium: Old Trafford; Attendance: 72,315; Referee: Peter Bankes

== Statistics ==
=== Appearances and goals ===
As of match played 28 May 2023

No.	Pos	Nat	Player	Total		Premier League		FA Cup		EFL Cup	
No.	Pos	Nat	Player	Apps	Goals	Apps	Goals	Apps	Goals	Apps	Goals
1	GK	(England) ENG	Dean Henderson	20	0	18	0	0	0	2	0
2	DF	(France) FRA	Giulian Biancone	3	0	0+2	0	0	0	1	0
3	DF	(England) ENG	Steve Cook	14	0	11+1	0	1	0	0+1	0
4	DF	(England) ENG	Joe Worrall	34	1	21+9	1	0	0	4	0
5	MF	(Belgium) BEL	Orel Mangala	31	1	20+7	1	0	0	4	0
6	MF	(England) ENG	Jonjo Shelvey	8	0	6+2	0	0	0	0	0
7	DF	(Wales) WAL	Neco Williams	36	1	20+11	1	1	0	2+2	0
8	MF	(England) ENG	Jack Colback	16	0	4+7	0	1	0	0+4	0
9	FW	(Nigeria) NGR	Taiwo Awoniyi	30	11	17+10	10	0	0	2+1	1
10	MF	(England) ENG	Morgan Gibbs-White	38	5	34+1	5	0	0	2+1	0
11	MF	(England) ENG	Jesse Lingard	20	2	12+5	0	0	0	2+1	2
12	GK	(Costa Rica) CRC	Keylor Navas	17	0	17	0	0	0	0	0
12	GK	(England) ENG	Jordan Smith	0	0	0	0	0	0	0	0
13	GK	(Wales) WAL	Wayne Hennessey	9	0	3+1	0	1	0	4	0
15	DF	(England) ENG	Harry Toffolo	21	0	9+10	0	1	0	1	0
16	FW	(England) ENG	Sam Surridge	27	3	1+19	1	1	0	4+2	2
18	MF	(Portugal) POR	Cafú	2	0	0+1	0	0	0	1	0
19	DF	(Senegal) SEN	Moussa Niakhaté	14	0	14	0	0	0	0	0
20	FW	(Wales) WAL	Brennan Johnson	44	10	33+5	8	0+1	0	4+1	2
21	MF	(Senegal) SEN	Cheikhou Kouyaté	22	1	10+11	1	0	0	1	0
22	MF	(England) ENG	Ryan Yates	31	2	21+5	0	0+1	1	4	1
23	MF	(Switzerland) SUI	Remo Freuler	33	0	24+4	0	0	0	5	0
24	DF	(Ivory Coast) CIV	Serge Aurier	28	1	22+2	1	0	0	3+1	0
25	FW	(Nigeria) NGR	Emmanuel Dennis	25	2	6+13	2	1	0	2+3	0
26	DF	(Scotland) SCO	Scott McKenna	24	0	19+1	0	1	0	2+1	0
27	DF	(England) ENG	Omar Richards	0	0	0	0	0	0	0	0
28	MF	(Brazil) BRA	Danilo	15	3	12+1	3	0	0	1+1	0
30	DF	(Ivory Coast) CIV	Willy Boly	15	1	9+2	0	0	0	4	1
31	MF	(Brazil) BRA	Gustavo Scarpa	10	0	2+4	0	1	0	3	0
32	DF	(Brazil) BRA	Renan Lodi	32	1	26+2	0	0	0	4	1
33	FW	(Montserrat) MSR	Lyle Taylor	0	0	0	0	0	0	0	0
34	FW	(Ghana) GHA	André Ayew	13	0	1+12	0	0	0	0	0
37	GK	(Bosnia and Herzegovina) BIH	Adnan Kanurić	0	0	0	0	0	0	0	0
38	DF	(Brazil) BRA	Felipe	16	0	15+1	0	0	0	0	0
39	FW	(New Zealand) NZL	Chris Wood	7	1	5+2	1	0	0	0	0
41	MF	(Wales) WAL	Oliver Hammond	2	0	0	0	0	0	0+2	0
46	DF	(England) ENG	Zach Abbott	1	0	0	0	0	0	0+1	0
49	FW	(England) ENG	Detlef Esapa Osong	1	0	0	0	0	0	0+1	0
Player(s) who left on loan but had featured this season
6	DF	(France) FRA	Loïc Mbe Soh	3	0	0	0	0+1	0	1+1	0
14	MF	(England) ENG	Lewis O'Brien	17	1	6+7	1	1	0	1+2	0
17	FW	(England) ENG	Alex Mighten	3	0	0+1	0	0	0	1+1	0
36	FW	(Northern Ireland) NIR	Dale Taylor	1	0	0	0	0	0	0+1	0
45	MF	(England) ENG	Billy Fewster	1	0	0	0	1	0	0	0
50	DF	(Northern Ireland) NIR	Aaron Donnelly	1	0	0	0	0	0	1	0

=== Goalscorers ===
Includes all competitive matches. The list is sorted by squad number when total goals are equal. Players with no goals not included in the list.

As of match played 28 May 2023

Rank	No.	Pos.	Nat.	Name	Premier League	FA Cup	EFL Cup	Total
1	9	FW	(Nigeria)	Taiwo Awoniyi	10	0	1	11
2	20	FW	(Wales)	Brennan Johnson	8	0	2	10
3	10	MF	(England)	Morgan Gibbs-White	5	0	0	5
4	16	FW	(England)	Sam Surridge	1	0	2	3
4	28	MF	(Brazil)	Danilo	3	0	0	3
6	11	MF	(England)	Jesse Lingard	0	0	2	2
6	22	MF	(England)	Ryan Yates	0	1	1	2
6	25	FW	(Nigeria)	Emmanuel Dennis	2	0	0	2
9	4	DF	(England)	Joe Worrall	1	0	0	1
9	5	MF	(Belgium)	Orel Mangala	1	0	0	1
9	7	DF	(Wales)	Neco Williams	1	0	0	1
9	14	MF	(England)	Lewis O'Brien	1	0	0	1
9	21	MF	(Senegal)	Cheikhou Kouyaté	1	0	0	1
9	24	DF	(Ivory Coast)	Serge Aurier	1	0	0	1
9	30	DF	(Ivory Coast)	Willy Boly	0	0	1	1
9	32	DF	(Brazil)	Renan Lodi	0	0	1	1
9	39	FW	(New Zealand)	Chris Wood	1	0	0	1
Own goal(s)					2	0	0	2
Total					38	1	10	49

=== Assists ===
Includes all competitive matches. The list is sorted by squad number when total assists are equal. Players with no assists not included in the list.

As of match played 28 May 2023

Rank	No.	Pos.	Nat.	Name	Premier League	FA Cup	EFL Cup	Total
1	10	MF	(England)	Morgan Gibbs-White	8	0	0	8
2	20	FW	(Wales)	Brennan Johnson	3	0	0	3
2	25	FW	(Nigeria)	Emmanuel Dennis	2	0	1	3
4	11	MF	(England)	Jesse Lingard	0	0	2	2
4	16	FW	(England)	Sam Surridge	0	0	2	2
4	18	MF	(Portugal)	Cafú	0	0	2	2
4	22	MF	(England)	Ryan Yates	2	0	0	2
4	28	MF	(Brazil)	Danilo	2	0	0	2
9	5	MF	(Belgium)	Orel Mangala	1	0	0	1
9	7	DF	(Wales)	Neco Williams	0	0	1	1
9	9	FW	(Nigeria)	Taiwo Awoniyi	1	0	0	1
9	15	DF	(England)	Harry Toffolo	0	0	1	1
9	30	DF	(Ivory Coast)	Willy Boly	1	0	0	1
9	32	DF	(Brazil)	Renan Lodi	1	0	0	1
9	38	DF	(Brazil)	Felipe	1	0	0	1
Total					22	0	9	31

=== Disciplinary record ===
Includes all competitive matches. The list is sorted by red cards, then yellow cards (and by squad number when total cards are equal). Players with no cards not included in the list.

As of match played 28 May 2023

Rank	No.	Pos.	Nat.	Name	Premier League			FA Cup			EFL Cup			Total			
Rank	No.	Pos.	Nat.	Name	Yellow card	(yellow card) (yellow-red card)	Red card	Yellow card	(yellow card) (yellow-red card)	Red card	Yellow card	(yellow card) (yellow-red card)	Red card	Yellow card	(yellow card) (yellow-red card)	Red card	
1	5	MF	(Belgium)	Orel Mangala	3	0	0	0	0	0	0	1	0	3	1	0	
2	4	DF	(England)	Joe Worrall	6	0	0	0	0	0	1	0	0	7	0	0	
2	7	DF	(Wales)	Neco Williams	7	0	0	0	0	0	0	0	0	7	0	0	
2	20	FW	(Wales)	Brennan Johnson	6	0	0	1	0	0	0	0	0	7	0	0	
2	32	DF	(Brazil)	Renan Lodi	7	0	0	0	0	0	0	0	0	7	0	0	
6	22	MF	(England)	Ryan Yates	5	0	0	0	0	0	1	0	0	6	0	0	
7	10	MF	(England)	Morgan Gibbs-White	5	0	0	0	0	0	0	0	0	5	0	0	
8	3	DF	(England)	Steve Cook	4	0	0	0	0	0	0	0	0	4	0	0	
8	16	FW	(England)	Sam Surridge	2	0	0	0	0	0	2	0	0	4	0	0	
8	23	MF	(Switzerland)	Remo Freuler	4	0	0	0	0	0	0	0	0	4	0	0	
8	26	DF	(Scotland)	Scott McKenna	4	0	0	0	0	0	0	0	0	4	0	0	
8	38	DF	(Brazil)	Felipe	4	0	0	0	0	0	0	0	0	4	0	0	
13	21	MF	(Senegal)	Cheikhou Kouyaté	3	0	0	0	0	0	0	0	0	3	0	0	
13	24	DF	(Ivory Coast)	Serge Aurier	2	0	0	0	0	0	1	0	0	3	0	0	
13	25	FW	(Nigeria)	Emmanuel Dennis	3	0	0	0	0	0	0	0	0	3	0	0	
16	1	GK	(England)	Dean Henderson	2	0	0	0	0	0	0	0	0	2	0	0	
16	6	MF	(England)	Jonjo Shelvey	2	0	0	0	0	0	0	0	0	2	0	0	
16	8	MF	(England)	Jack Colback	0	0	0	1	0	0	1	0	0	2	0	0	
16	9	FW	(Nigeria)	Taiwo Awoniyi	2	0	0	0	0	0	0	0	0	2	0	0	
16	11	MF	(England)	Jesse Lingard	1	0	0	0	0	0	1	0	0	2	0	0	
16	12	GK	(Costa Rica)	Keylor Navas	2	0	0	0	0	0	0	0	0	2	0	0	
16	14	MF	(England)	Lewis O'Brien	2	0	0	0	0	0	0	0	0	2	0	0	
16	15	DF	(England)	Harry Toffolo	2	0	0	0	0	0	0	0	0	2	0	0	
16	30	DF	(Ivory Coast)	Willy Boly	2	0	0	0	0	0	0	0	0	2	0	0	
25	19	DF	(Senegal)	Moussa Niakhaté	1	0	0	0	0	0	0	0	0	1	0	0	
25	28	MF	(Brazil)	Danilo	1	0	0	0	0	0	0	0	0	1	0	0	
25	31	MF	(Brazil)	Gustavo Scarpa	1	0	0	0	0	0	0	0	0	1	0	0	
25	34	FW	(Ghana)	André Ayew	1	0	0	0	0	0	0	0	0	1	0	0	
25	Total					82	0	0	2	0	0	7	1	0	91	1	0

=== Clean sheets ===
Includes all competitive matches. The list is sorted by squad number when total clean sheets are equal. Numbers in parentheses represent games where both goalkeepers participated and both kept a clean sheet; the number in parentheses is awarded to the goalkeeper who was substituted on, whilst a full clean sheet is awarded to the goalkeeper who was on the field at the start of play. Players with no clean sheets not included in the list.

As of match played 28 May 2023

Rank	No.	Nat.	Name	Matches played	Premier League	FA Cup	EFL Cup	Total
1	1	(England)	Dean Henderson	20	6	0	0	6
2	13	(Wales)	Wayne Hennessey	9	0 (1)	0	2	2 (1)
3	12	(Costa Rica)	Keylor Navas	17	2	0	0	2
Totals					8	0	2	10

== Awards and nominations ==
=== Club ===
==== Player of the Season ====
Result	Player	Ref
Won	(England) Morgan Gibbs-White	

Goal of the Season

Result	Player	Ref
Won	(New Zealand) Chris Wood	

=== League ===
==== Premier League Player of the Month ====
Round	Result	Pos.	Nat.	Player	Ref
January	Nominated (Note: Won by Manchester United's Marcus Rashford)	FW	(Wales)	Brennan Johnson	

==== Premier League Goal of the Month ====
Round	Result	Pos.	Nat.	Player	Ref
February	Nominated (Note: Won by Fulham's Willian)	FW	(Wales)	Brennan Johnson	

==== Premier League Manager of the Month ====
Round	Result	Nat.	Player	Ref
January	Nominated (Note: Won by Arsenal's Mikel Arteta)	(Wales)	Steve Cooper	

=== Cups ===
==== Carabao Cup Player of the Round ====
Round	Result	Pos.	Nat.	Player	Ref
Third round	Nominated (Note: Won by Newcastle United's Nick Pope)	MF	(England)	Jesse Lingard	
Fourth round	Won	FW	(Wales)	Brennan Johnson	
Quarter-finals	Won	GK	(England)	Dean Henderson	

==== Carabao Cup Goal of the Round ====
Round	Result	Pos.	Nat.	Player	Ref
Third round	Won	DF	(Brazil)	Renan Lodi	

== Injuries ==
The following first-team players were reportedly ruled out for at least 30 days after suffering an injury during the 2022–23 season.

As of 13 May 2023

No.	Pos.	Player	Last game before injury	First game after recovery	Forest games missed	Nature of injury	Ref.
27	DF	(England) Omar Richards	Against; Wolfsburg (14 May 2022)	Not yet recovered	42	Hairline fracture of the leg	
19	DF	(Senegal) Moussa Niakhaté	Against; West Ham United (14 August 2022)	Against; Tottenham Hotspur (11 March 2023)	30	Hamstring	
5	MF	(Belgium) Orel Mangala	Against; Everton (20 August 2022)	Against; Leicester City (3 October 2022)	5	Hamstring	
2	DF	(France) Giulian Biancone	Against; Brighton and Hove Albion (18 October 2022)	Not yet recovered	30	Anterior cruciate ligament injury	
21	MF	(Senegal) Cheikhou Kouyaté	Against the Netherlands (21 November 2022)	Against; Wolves (1 April 2023)	17	Torn hamstring	
9	FW	(Nigeria) Taiwo Awoniyi	Against; Southampton (4 January 2023)	Against; Wolves (1 April 2023)	13	Groin	
1	GK	(England) Dean Henderson	Against; Leicester City (14 January 2023)	Not yet recovered	18	Thigh	
22	MF	(England) Ryan Yates	Against; Bournemouth (21 January 2023)	Against; Everton (5 March 2023)	6	Illness	
26	DF	(Scotland) Scott McKenna	Against; Fulham (11 February 2023)	Against; Aston Villa (8 April 2023)	7	Hamstring	
30	DF	(Ivory Coast) Willy Boly	Against; Fulham (11 February 2023)	Against; Southampton (8 May 2023)	11	Hamstring	
39	FW	(New Zealand) Chris Wood	Against; Tottenham Hotspur (11 March 2023)	Not yet recovered	9	Thigh	
22	MF	(England) Ryan Yates	Against; Newcastle United (17 March 2023)	Against; Brentford (29 April 2023)	6	Shoulder	
24	DF	(Ivory Coast) Serge Aurier	Against; Comoros (24 March 2023)	Against; Brighton (26 April 2023)	5	Knock	
8	MF	(England) Jack Colback	Against; Wolves (1 April 2023)	Not yet recovered	8	Concussion	
31	MF	(Brazil) Gustavo Scarpa	Against; Leeds United (4 April 2023)	Not yet recovered	7	Calf	
26	DF	(Scotland) Scott McKenna	Against; Liverpool (22 April 2023)	Not yet recovered	4	Fractured collarbone	
7	DF	(Wales) Neco Williams	Against; Brighton (26 April 2023)	Not yet recovered	3	Broken jaw	
