= Genki Haraguchi =

Japanese footballer (born 1991)

Genki Haraguchi 原口 元気
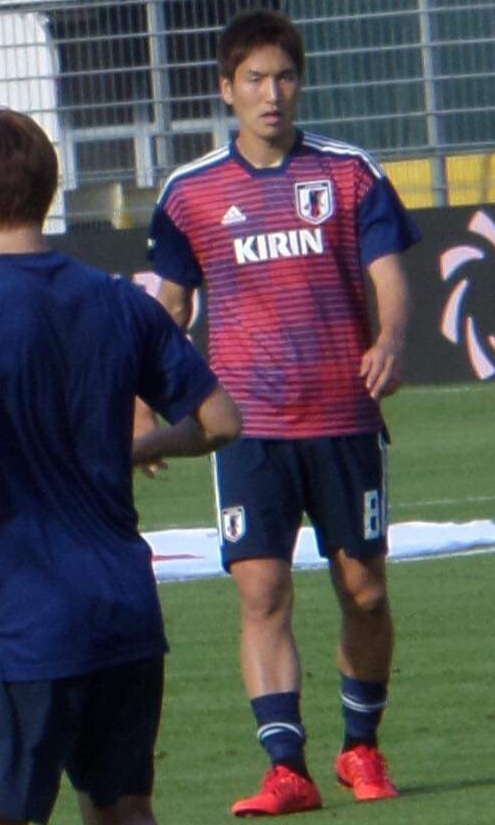
- Haraguchi with Japan in 2018

Personal information
- Date of birth: 9 May 1991 (age 35)
- Place of birth: Kumagaya, Saitama, Japan
- Height: 1.78 m (5 ft 10 in)
- Position: Attacking midfielder

Team information
- Current team: Beerschot
- Number: 78

Youth career
- Konan Minami SSS
- 2004–2009: Urawa Red Diamonds

Senior career*
Years	Team	Apps	(Gls)
2008–2014	Urawa Red Diamonds	167	(33)
2014–2018	Hertha BSC	91	(4)
2018	→ Fortuna Düsseldorf (loan)	13	(1)
2018–2021	Hannover 96	94	(15)
2021–2023	Union Berlin	41	(2)
2023–2024	VfB Stuttgart	13	(0)
2024–2025	Urawa Red Diamonds	31	(1)
2025–	Beerschot	26	(3)

International career^{‡}
2008	Japan U19	1	(0)
2011	Japan U22	3	(0)
2012	Japan U23	1	(1)
2011–2022	Japan	74	(11)
Medal record
Representing Japan
AFC Asian Cup
Silver medal – second place	2019 United Arab Emirates
- * Club domestic league appearances and goals as of 19 April 2026 ‡ National team caps and goals as of 23 September 2022

Genki Haraguchi (原口 元気, Haraguchi Genki; born 9 May 1991) is a Japanese professional footballer who plays as an attacking midfielder for Belgian Challenger Pro League club Beerschot.

== Club career ==
=== Urawa Red Diamonds ===
Haraguchi made his debut as a professional on 25 May 2008, in the J. League Cup match against Nagoya Grampus. He scored his first professional goal against Nagoya Grampus in a J. League Division 1 game on 12 April 2009.

=== Hertha BSC ===
On 25 May 2014, it was announced that Haraguchi had been signed by Hertha BSC. He scored his first competitive goal for Hertha on 16 August 2014 in a 4–2 win during the first round DFB Pokal game against FC Viktoria Köln. He scored his first Bundesliga goal on 14 March against Schalke 04 to put Hertha 2–1 in front.

In January 2018, Haraguchi joined Fortuna Düsseldorf on loan until the end of the season.

=== Fortuna Düsseldorf (loan) ===
While on loan at Düsseldorf for the 2017–18 season, Haraguchi played a key role in helping the side gain promotion to the Bundesliga.

=== Hannover 96 ===
On 11 June 2018, Haraguchi announced that he had reached an agreement to join Hannover 96 for the 2018–19 season.

=== VfB Stuttgart ===
On 30 January 2023, Haraguchi signed for VfB Stuttgart on an eighteen-month contract. On 18 May 2024, VfB Stuttgart announced that Haraguchi will leave the club after this season when his contract expires.

== International career ==
=== 2011 AFC Asian Cup ===
Haraguchi was elected as one of the preliminary registration members on Japan's 50-man list.

=== 2013 EAFF East Asian Cup ===
Haraguchi played for Japan in the 2013 EAFF East Asian Cup. He played against China PR and South Korea for 71 and 90 minutes respectively, and helped Japan to win the championship for the first time.

=== 2018 FIFA World Cup ===
In May 2018, Haraguchi was named to Japan's preliminary squad for the 2018 FIFA World Cup in Russia.

== Career statistics ==
=== Club ===
As of match played 6 September 2026

Appearances and goals by club, season and competition
Club	Season	League			National cup (Note: Includes Emperor's Cup and DFB-Pokal)		League cup (Note: Includes J. League Cup)		Continental (Note: Includes AFC Champions League, UEFA Europa League and UEFA Europa Conference League)		Total	
Club	Season	Division	Apps	Goals	Apps	Goals	Apps	Goals	Apps	Goals	Apps	Goals
Urawa Red Diamonds	2008	J1 League	0	0	0	0	1	0	0	0	1	0
Urawa Red Diamonds	2009	J1 League	32	1	1	0	6	1	0	0	39	2
Urawa Red Diamonds	2010	J1 League	26	2	2	2	6	0	0	0	34	4
Urawa Red Diamonds	2011	J1 League	30	9	1	0	4	2	0	0	35	11
Urawa Red Diamonds	2012	J1 League	32	6	1	0	4	0	0	0	37	6
Urawa Red Diamonds	2013	J1 League	33	11	4	0	0	0	4	2	41	13
Urawa Red Diamonds	2014	J1 League	14	4	3	0	0	0	0	0	17	4
Urawa Red Diamonds	2024	J1 League	10	1	0	0	0	0	0	0	10	1
Urawa Red Diamonds	2025	J1 League	21	0	2	0	1	0	2	0	26	0
Urawa Red Diamonds	Total		198	34	14	2	22	3	6	2	240	41
Hertha BSC	2014–15	Bundesliga	21	1	2	1	—		—		23	2
Hertha BSC	2015–16	Bundesliga	32	2	5	1	—		—		37	3
Hertha BSC	2016–17	Bundesliga	31	1	2	0	—		1	0	34	1
Hertha BSC	2017–18	Bundesliga	7	0	1	0	—		3	0	11	0
Hertha BSC	Total		91	4	10	2	—		4	0	105	6
Fortuna Düsseldorf (loan)	2017–18	2. Bundesliga	13	1	0	0	—		—		13	1
Hannover 96	2018–19	Bundesliga	28	0	1	0	—		—		29	0
Hannover 96	2019–20	2. Bundesliga	32	6	1	0	—		—		33	6
Hannover 96	2020–21	2. Bundesliga	34	9	2	0	—		—		36	9
Hannover 96	Total		94	15	4	0	—		—		98	15
Union Berlin	2021–22	Bundesliga	30	2	5	0	—		7	0	42	2
Union Berlin	2022–23	Bundesliga	11	0	2	0	—		6	0	19	0
Union Berlin	Total		41	2	7	0	—		13	0	61	2
VfB Stuttgart	2022–23	Bundesliga	11	0	2	0	—		—		13	0
VfB Stuttgart	2023–24	Bundesliga	2	0	1	0	—		—		3	0
VfB Stuttgart	Total		13	0	3	0	—		—		16	0
K Beerschot VA	2025–26	Challenger Pro League	30	4	2	1	—		—		32	5
K Beerschot VA	2026–27	Challenger Pro League	4	0	0	0	—		—		4	0
K Beerschot VA	Total		34	4	2	1	0	0	0	0	36	5
Career total			484	60	40	5	22	3	23	2	569	70

=== International ===
As of match played 23 September 2022

Appearances and goals by national team and year
National team	Year	Apps	Goals
Japan	2011	1	0
Japan	2012	0	0
Japan	2013	2	0
Japan	2014	0	0
Japan	2015	8	1
Japan	2016	9	5
Japan	2017	9	0
Japan	2018	11	2
Japan	2019	13	3
Japan	2020	4	0
Japan	2021	9	0
Japan	2022	8	0
Total		74	11

Scores and results list Japan's goal tally first, score column indicates score after each Haraguchi goal.

List of international goals scored by Genki Haraguchi
No.	Date	Venue	Opponent	Score	Result	Competition
1	11 June 2015	Nissan Stadium, Yokohama, Japan	Iraq	4–0	4–0	Friendly
2	29 March 2016	Saitama Stadium 2002, Saitama, Japan	Syria	5–0	5–0	2018 FIFA World Cup qualification
3	6 September 2016	Rajamangala Stadium, Bangkok, Thailand	Thailand	1–0	2–0	2018 FIFA World Cup qualification
4	6 October 2016	Saitama Stadium 2002, Saitama, Japan	Iraq	1–0	2–1	2018 FIFA World Cup qualification
5	11 October 2016	Etihad Stadium, Melbourne, Australia	Australia	1–0	1–1	2018 FIFA World Cup qualification
6	15 November 2016	Saitama Stadium 2002, Saitama, Japan	Saudi Arabia	2–0	2–1	2018 FIFA World Cup qualification
7	2 July 2018	Rostov Arena, Rostov-on-Don, Russia	Belgium	1–0	2–3	2018 FIFA World Cup
8	20 November 2018	Toyota Stadium, Toyota, Japan	Kyrgyzstan	2–0	4–0	2018 Kirin Challenge Cup
9	13 January 2019	Zayed Sports City Stadium, Abu Dhabi, United Arab Emirates	Oman	1–0	1–0	2019 AFC Asian Cup
10	28 January 2019	Hazza bin Zayed Stadium, Al Ain, United Arab Emirates	Iran	3–0	3–0	2019 AFC Asian Cup
11	14 November 2019	Dolen Omurzakov Stadium, Bishkek, Kyrgyzstan	Kyrgyzstan	2–0	2–0	2022 FIFA World Cup qualification

== Honours ==
Fortuna Düsseldorf

- 2. Bundesliga: 2017–18

Japan

- AFC Asian Cup runner-up: 2019
- EAFF East Asian Cup: 2013

Individual

- J. League Cup New Hero Award: 2011
