= Ayouba Kosiah =

Liberian footballer

Personal information
- Date of birth: 22 July 2001 (age 25)
- Place of birth: Almere, Netherlands
- Height: 6 ft 2 in (1.88 m)
- Position: Forward

Team information
- Current team: Radnik Surdulica
- Number: 92

Youth career
- 2015–2018: FC Utrecht
- 2018–2021: Almere City

Senior career*
Years	Team	Apps	(Gls)
2021–2023	NAC Breda	21	(0)
2023–2026	Beerschot	34	(6)
2026–	Radnik Surdulica	15	(0)

International career^{‡}
2021–	Liberia	18	(6)
- * Club domestic league appearances and goals as of 15 September 2026 ‡ National team caps and goals as of 13 Novbemer 2026

Ayouba Kosiah (born 22 July 2001) is a professional footballer who plays as a forward for Serbian club Radnik. Born in the Netherlands, he plays for the Liberia national team.

== Club career ==
A youth product of FC Utrecht and Almere City, Kosiah signed a professional contract with NAC Breda on 8 August 2021. He made his professional debut with NAC Breda in a 2–2 Eerste Divisie tie with VVV-Venlo on 8 August 2021.

== International career ==
Born in the Netherlands, Kosiah is of Liberian descent. He made his international debut for Liberia in a 2–0 World Cup qualifying loss to Nigeria on 3 September 2021.

== Career statistics ==
=== Club ===
As of match played 15 September 2026

Appearances and goals by club, season and competition
Club	Season	League			National cup (Note: Includes KNVB Cup, Belgian Cup)		Other		Total	
Club	Season	Division	Apps	Goals	Apps	Goals	Apps	Goals	Apps	Goals
NAC Breda	2021–22	Eerste Divisie	15	0	0	0	0	0	15	0
NAC Breda	2022–23	Eerste Divisie	6	0	1	0	—		7	0
NAC Breda	Total		21	0	1	0	0	0	22	0
Beerschot	2022–23	Challenger Pro League	6	2	0	0	—		6	2
Beerschot	2023–24	Challenger Pro League	5	3	1	0	—		6	3
Beerschot	2024–25	Belgian Pro League	18	1	3	0	—		21	1
Beerschot	2025–26	Challenger Pro League	7	0	0	0	—		7	0
Beerschot	Total		36	6	4	0	—		40	6
Radnik Surdulica	2025–26	Serbian SuperLiga	10	0	—		—		10	0
Radnik Surdulica	2026–27	Serbian SuperLiga	5	0	—		—		5	0
Radnik Surdulica	Total		15	0	—		—		15	0
Career total			72	6	5	0	0	0	77	6

=== International ===
As of match played 13 November 2026

Appearances and goals by national team and year
National team	Year	Apps	Goals
Liberia	2021	3	0
Liberia	2022	3	0
Liberia	2025	7	3
Liberia	2026	5	3
Total		18	6

Scores and results list Liberia's goal tally first, score column indicates score after each Kosiah goal.

List of international goals scored by Ayouba Kosiah
No.	Date	Venue	Opponent	Score	Result	Competition
1	8 September 2025	Bingu National Stadium, Lilongwe, Malawi	Malawi	1–0	2–2	2026 FIFA World Cup qualification
2	8 September 2025	Bingu National Stadium, Lilongwe, Malawi	Malawi	2–0	2–2	2026 FIFA World Cup qualification
3	9 October 2025	Samuel Kanyon Doe Sports Complex, Paynesville, Liberia	Namibia	1–0	3–1	2026 FIFA World Cup qualification
4	9 June 2026	Samuel Kanyon Doe Sports Complex, Paynesville, Liberia	Sierra Leone	2–0	3–1	Friendly
5	9 June 2026	Samuel Kanyon Doe Sports Complex, Paynesville, Liberia	Sierra Leone	3–0	3–1	Friendly
6	13 November 2026	Estádio Nacional de Cabo Verde, Praia, Cape Verde	Cape Verde	2–4	2–4	2027 Africa Cup of Nations qualification
