= Dennis Gyamfi =

Dutch footballer

Personal information
- Full name: Dennis Gyamfi
- Date of birth: 30 December 2001 (age 24)
- Place of birth: Leiderdorp, Netherlands
- Height: 1.73 m (5 ft 8 in)
- Position: Right back

Team information
- Current team: Beerschot
- Number: 76

Youth career
- RKVV Meerburg
- Hanworth Sports
- –2016: Brentford
- 2016–2020: Leicester City

Senior career*
Years	Team	Apps	(Gls)
2020–2023	Dinamo Zagreb II	27	(1)
2023–2024	Den Bosch	41	(0)
2025–	Beerschot	27	(0)
- * Club domestic league appearances and goals as of 14:57, 1 September 2026 (UTC)

Dennis Gyamfi (born 30 December 2001) is a Dutch professional footballer who plays as a right back for Challenger Pro League club Beerschot.

Gyamfi grew up in England and is a product of the Leicester City and Brentford academies. He began his senior career with Dinamo Zagreb II in 2020 and transferred to Den Bosch in 2023. Gyamfi transferred to Belgian club Beerschot in 2025.

== Club career ==
=== Youth career and Dinamo Zagreb II ===
A right back, Gyamfi began his youth career in his native Netherlands with RKVV Meerburg. He moved to England in 2009 and had spells in the youth systems at London clubs Hanworth Sports and Brentford. Gyamfi transferred to the Leicester City Academy at the age of 14 and progressed through the ranks. At the end of the 2019–20 season, he turned down the offer of a three-year professional contract with Leicester City and became a free agent. Gyamfi signed a 3 1/2-year contract with Croatian First League club Dinamo Zagreb on a free transfer in December 2020. He made 26 Croatian Second League appearances and scored one goal for the reserve team prior to its disbandment at the end of the 2021–22 season.

In July 2022, Gyamfi joined League One club Cheltenham Town on trial and made four pre-season friendly appearances, but was not offered a contract. He failed to win a call into a Dinamo Zagreb matchday squad during the first half of the 2022–23 season and departed the Stadion Maksimir in January 2023.

=== Den Bosch ===
Following a successful trial spell, Gyamfi signed a 2 1/2-year contract with Eerste Divisie club Den Bosch on 31 January 2023. He made 42 appearances over the course of poor 2022–23 and 2023–24 seasons for the club. Gyamfi's contract was terminated by mutual consent on 1 August 2024.

=== Beerschot ===
On 18 March 2025, Gyamfi joined the U23 team at Beerschot on a contract running until the end of the 2024–25 season. After the first team's relegation to the Challenger Pro League at the end of the 2024–25 season, Gyamfi was retained on a one-year contract, with the option of a further year. He made 26 appearances during the 2025–26 season, which ended with defeat in the playoff semi-finals. In March 2026, the club triggered its one-year option on Gyamfi's contract and he signed a new three-year contract in August 2026.

== International career ==
Gyamfi is eligible to play for Netherlands, Ghana and England at international level. In November 2019, Gyamfi was named in the Netherlands U19 squad as a standby for two friendly matches. He did not win a call into either matchday squad.

== Personal life ==
Born in the Netherlands of Ghanaian descent, Gyamfi moved to Hounslow with his family at age seven in 2009. He is fluent in the Dutch language. His brothers Gideon, Johnson and Pierluigi also became footballers. Gyamfi attended Loughborough College.

== Career statistics ==
As of match played 29 August 2026

Appearances and goals by club, season and competition
Club	Season	League			National cup (Note: Includes KNVB Cup, Belgian Cup)		Other		Total	
Club	Season	Division	Apps	Goals	Apps	Goals	Apps	Goals	Apps	Goals
Dinamo Zagreb II	2020–21	Croatian Second League	6	0	―		―		6	0
Dinamo Zagreb II	2021–22	Croatian Second League	20	1	―		―		20	1
Dinamo Zagreb II	Total		26	1	―		―		26	1
Den Bosch	2022–23	Eerste Divisie	15	0	―		―		15	0
Den Bosch	2023–24	Eerste Divisie	26	0	1	0	―		27	0
Den Bosch	Total		41	0	1	0	―		42	0
Beerschot	2025–26	Challenger Pro League	24	0	1	0	1 (Note: Appearance in Challenger Pro League play-offs)	0	26	0
Beerschot	2026–27	Challenger Pro League	3	0	0	0	―		3	0
Beerschot	Total		27	0	1	0	1	0	29	0
Career total			94	1	2	0	1	0	97	1
