= Emre Uzun =

Turkish footballer

Personal information
- Date of birth: 20 June 2005 (age 21)
- Place of birth: Hanover, Germany
- Height: 1.79 m (5 ft 10 in)
- Position: Midfielder

Team information
- Current team: Beerschot
- Number: 11

Youth career
- 2016: Arifiye Atılganspor
- 2016–2017: Nejat Ersin
- 2017–2019: Ankaraspor
- 2019–2023: Antalyaspor

Senior career*
Years	Team	Apps	(Gls)
2023–2025	Antalyaspor	15	(0)
2025–	Beerschot	3	(0)

International career^{‡}
2022–2023	Turkey U18	4	(1)
2024	Turkey U19	13	(2)
2024	Turkey U20	1	(0)
- * Club domestic league appearances and goals as of 19 April 2026 ‡ National team caps and goals as of 6 September 2024

Emre Uzun (born 20 June 2005) is a Turkish professional footballer who plays as a midfielder for Belgian Challenger Pro League club Beerschot.

== Club career ==
Uzun is a youth product of Arifiye Atılganspor, Nejat Ersin, Ankaraspor and Antalyaspor. On 1 July 2020, he signed his first professional contract with Antalyaspor at the age of 15. On 6 April 2022, he extended his contract for 3+2 more seasons. He made his senior and professional debut with Antalyaspor as a substitute in a 3–0 Turkish Cup win over 52 Orduspor, scoring a penalty for his side a couple minutes after being substituted in. On 17 December 2024, he suffered a cruciate ligament injury that ruled him out for the remainder of the 2024–25 season.

On 22 July 2025, Uzun signed a two-season contract with Beerschot in Belgium.

== International career ==
Born in Germany, Uzun is of Turkish descent and holds dual citizenship. He is a youth international for Turkey, having played for the Turkey U19s in 2024.
