= Anas Haj Mohamed =

Tunisian footballer (born 2005)

Personal information
- Date of birth: 26 March 2005 (age 21)
- Place of birth: Chieti, Italy
- Height: 1.75 m (5 ft 9 in)
- Position: Forward

Team information
- Current team: Beerschot
- Number: 21

Youth career
- 2011–2021: Chievo
- 2021–2023: Parma

Senior career*
Years	Team	Apps	(Gls)
2023–2025	Parma	15	(1)
2025–	Beerschot	6	(0)

International career^{‡}
2023–	Tunisia	1	(0)
- * Club domestic league appearances and goals as of 19 April 2026 ‡ National team caps and goals as of 02:37, 8 September 2023 (UTC)

Anas Haj Mohamed (Arabic: أَنَس الْحَاجّ مُحَمَّد; born 26 March 2005) is a professional footballer who plays as a forward for Belgian Challenger Pro League club Beerschot. Born in Italy, he plays for the Tunisia national team.

== Club career ==
Haj began playing football with the youth academy of Chievo at the age of 6. In August 2021, he moved to the youth academy of Parma. In his first season with Parma's U19s, he scored 15 goals and made 6 assists in 32 games. He was promoted to Parma's senior side for the 2023–24 season in the Serie B, taking the number 61.

On 8 September 2025, Haj signed a three-year contract with Beerschot in Belgium.

== International career ==
Born in Italy, Haj was born to a Tunisian father and Moroccan mother and holds all three nationalities. He was called up to the Italy U17s in April 2022 for 2023 UEFA European Under-17 Championship qualification matches. In March 2023, he was called up to a training camp for the Morocco U20s.

In September 2023, Haj was called up to the senior Tunisia national team for the first time. That same week he was called up to the Italy U19s for a set of friendlies. He opted to play for Tunisia, making his debut as a late substitute in a 3–0 2023 Africa Cup of Nations qualification win over Botswana on 7 September 2023.

== Playing style ==
Haj has been described as a versatile forward, who can play as a striker, a winger or a second striker. He has been mainly regarded for his speed, his finishing skills, his vision and his technique.
