= Billy Fewster =

English footballer (born 2003)

Personal information
- Full name: William Charles Storm Fewster
- Date of birth: 31 July 2003 (age 23)
- Position: Midfielder

Team information
- Current team: Alfreton Town

Youth career
- 2011–2014: Pickering Town
- 2014–2021: Leeds United
- 2021–2023: Nottingham Forest

Senior career*
Years	Team	Apps	(Gls)
2023	Nottingham Forest	0	(0)
2023	→ Scunthorpe United (loan)	2	(0)
2023–	Alfreton Town	88	(10)
- * Club domestic league appearances and goals as of 12:43, 4 July 2026 (UTC)

William Charles Storm Fewster (born 31 July 2003) is an English footballer who plays as a midfielder for Alfreton Town in the National League North.

== Early life ==
Fewster played as a youngster with Pickering Town joining at under-8 level and captaining their under-11 team.

== Career ==
Fewster was on the books at Leeds United before joining Nottingham Forest in the summer of 2021. He made the Forest first team squad for an EFL Cup win at Grimsby Town at the start of the 2022–23 season. He made his first team debut on 7 January 2023 at Blackpool in the FA Cup, starting the game and playing 65 minutes before being substituted in Forest's 4–1 defeat at Bloomfield Road.

On 2 February 2023, it was announced that Fewster had joined National League side Scunthorpe United on loan for the remainder of the season.

Fewster was released by Forest following their 2022-23 season. On 2 August 2023, Fewster signed with National League North side Alfreton Town.

== Career statistics ==
=== Club ===
As of 9 August 2024.

Appearances and goals by club, season and competition
Club	Season	League			FA Cup		EFL Cup		Other		Total	
Club	Season	Division	Apps	Goals	Apps	Goals	Apps	Goals	Apps	Goals	Apps	Goals
Nottingham Forest	2022–23	Premier League	0	0	1	0	0	0	0	0	1	0
Alfreton Town F.C.	2023-24	National League North	41	4	3	1	—				44	5
Career total			41	4	4	1	0	0	0	0	45	5
