= Loïc Mbe Soh =

Footballer (born 2001)

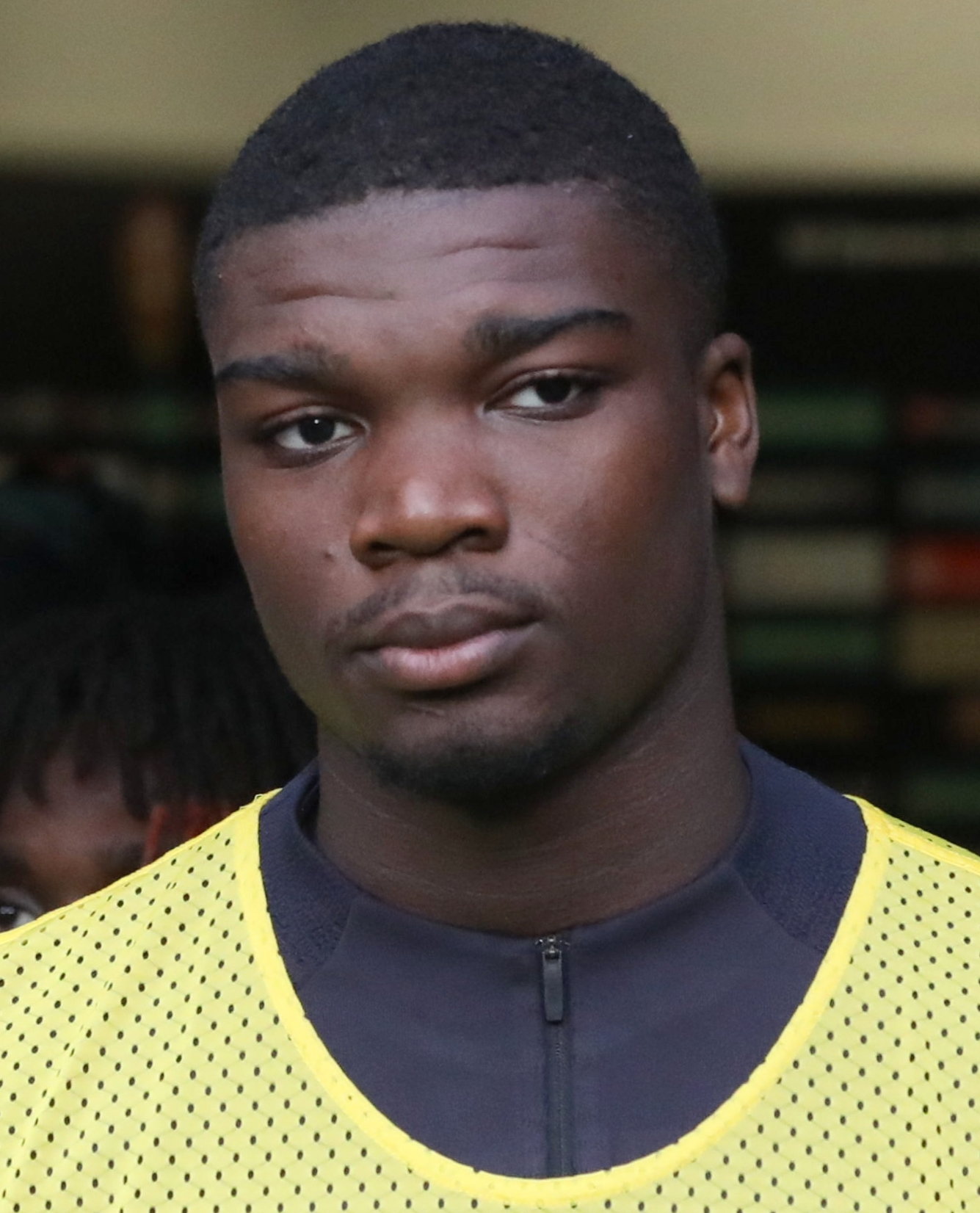
- Mbe Soh with Paris Saint-Germain in 2019

Personal information
- Full name: Loïc Junior Mbe Soh
- Date of birth: 13 June 2001 (age 25)
- Place of birth: Nanga Eboko, Cameroon
- Height: 1.86 m (6 ft 1 in)
- Position: Centre-back

Team information
- Current team: Sparta Prague
- Number: 22

Youth career
- 2009–2012: JS Pontoisienne
- 2012–2013: Courbevoie SF
- 2013–2018: Paris Saint-Germain

Senior career*
| Years | Team | Apps | (Gls) |
| 2018–2019 | Paris Saint-Germain B | 20 | (0) |
| 2019–2020 | Paris Saint-Germain | 3 | (0) |
| 2020–2024 | Nottingham Forest | 9 | (1) |
| 2023 | → Guingamp (loan) | 14 | (1) |
| 2023–2024 | → Almere City (loan) | 20 | (1) |
| 2024–2026 | Beerschot | 40 | (3) |
| 2026 | Sint-Truiden | 14 | (2) |
| 2026– | Sparta Prague | 0 | (0) |

International career
| 2016–2017 | France U16 | 9 | (0) |
| 2017–2018 | France U17 | 9 | (1) |
| 2018–2019 | France U18 | 10 | (0) |
| 2019–2020 | France U19 | 6 | (1) |
- * Club domestic league appearances and goals as of 31 May 2026

Loïc Junior Mbe Soh (born 13 June 2001) is a professional footballer who plays as a centre-back for Czech First League club Sparta Prague. Born in Cameroon, he has represented France at youth international level.

== Club career ==
=== Paris Saint-Germain ===
An academy graduate of Paris Saint-Germain, Mbe Soh signed his first professional contract in July 2018, which tied him to the club until June 2021. He made his Ligue 1 debut for PSG on 11 May 2019, in a match against Angers. Mbe Soh made his only appearance of the 2019–20 season in a 2–0 league loss against Reims. He played as a right back, before being subbed off for Thomas Meunier in the 59th minute of the match.

On 15 June 2020, Mbe Soh was nominated for the 2020 Golden Boy Award, being one of three PSG players in the 100-player shortlist. On 17 July 2020, he scored a goal in a friendly match against Waasland-Beveren, which ended in a 7–0 victory for PSG.

=== Nottingham Forest ===
On 11 September 2020, Mbe Soh signed for Nottingham Forest, the fee of the deal being undisclosed. He made his debut on 25 September in a 1–0 defeat to Huddersfield Town. He scored his first goal for the club in a 2–1 defeat to Middlesbrough on 20 January 2021.

On 23 January 2023, Mbe Soh joined Ligue 2 side Guingamp on loan for the remainder of the season.

On 1 September 2023, Mbe Soh joined Eredivisie club Almere City on a season-long loan.

On 5 June 2024, Forest announced he would be leaving in the summer when his contract expired.

=== Beerschot ===
On 26 August 2024, Mbe Soh signed with Beerschot in Belgium.

=== Sint-Truiden ===
On 21 January 2026, Mbe Soh moved to Sint-Truiden.

=== Sparta Prague ===
On 25 August 2026, Mbe Soh signed a contract with Czech First League club Sparta Prague.

== International career ==
Mbe Soh is a French youth international, and has captained the France U18 team on various occasions.

== Career statistics ==
As of 1 July 2024

Appearances and goals by club, season and competition
| Club | Season | League | | | National cup | | League cup | | Other | | Total | |
| Club | Season | Division | Apps | Goals | Apps | Goals | Apps | Goals | Apps | Goals | Apps | Goals |
|---|---|---|---|---|---|---|---|---|---|---|---|---|
| Paris Saint-Germain B | 2017–18 | Championnat National 2 | 4 | 0 | — | | — | | — | | 4 | 0 |
| Paris Saint-Germain B | 2018–19 | Championnat National 2 | 16 | 0 | — | | — | | — | | 16 | 0 |
| Paris Saint-Germain B | Total | | 20 | 0 | — | | — | | — | | 20 | 0 |
| Paris Saint-Germain | 2018–19 | Ligue 1 | 2 | 0 | 0 | 0 | 0 | 0 | 0 | 0 | 2 | 0 |
| Paris Saint-Germain | 2019–20 | Ligue 1 | 1 | 0 | 0 | 0 | 0 | 0 | 0 | 0 | 1 | 0 |
| Paris Saint-Germain | Total | | 3 | 0 | 0 | 0 | 0 | 0 | 0 | 0 | 3 | 0 |
| Nottingham Forest | 2020–21 | EFL Championship | 7 | 1 | 1 | 0 | 0 | 0 | — | | 8 | 1 |
| Nottingham Forest | 2021–22 | EFL Championship | 2 | 0 | 0 | 0 | 0 | 0 | 0 | 0 | 2 | 0 |
| Nottingham Forest | 2022–23 | Premier League | 0 | 0 | 1 | 0 | 2 | 0 | — | | 3 | 0 |
| Nottingham Forest | Total | | 9 | 1 | 2 | 0 | 2 | 0 | 0 | 0 | 13 | 1 |
| Guingamp (loan) | 2022–23 | Ligue 2 | 14 | 1 | 0 | 0 | — | | — | | 14 | 1 |
| Almere City (loan) | 2023–24 | Eredivisie | 20 | 1 | 2 | 0 | — | | — | | 22 | 1 |
| Beerschot | 2024–25 | Belgian Pro League | 0 | 0 | 0 | 0 | — | | — | | 0 | 0 |
| Career total | | | 66 | 3 | 4 | 0 | 2 | 0 | 0 | 0 | 72 | 3 |

== Honours ==
Paris Saint-Germain

- Ligue 1: 2018–19, 2019–20

Nottingham Forest

- EFL Championship play-offs: 2022
