= Óscar Vargas =

Óscar Vargas may refer to:

- Óscar Vargas Guzmán, Chilean soldier and government official
- Óscar Vargas (cyclist) (born 1964), retired road racing cyclist from Colombia
- Óscar Vargas (footballer) (born 1980), Honduran former footballer
