= Antoine Colassin =

Belgian footballer (2001)

Personal information
- Date of birth: 26 February 2001 (age 25)
- Place of birth: Ottignies, Belgium
- Height: 1.88 m (6 ft 2 in)
- Position: Striker

Team information
- Current team: Charleroi
- Number: 25

Youth career
- 2007–2014: RFC Grand-Leez
- 2014–2016: Charleroi
- 2016–2020: Anderlecht

Senior career*
Years	Team	Apps	(Gls)
2019–2024	Anderlecht	12	(3)
2021	→ Zulte Waregem (loan)	10	(0)
2022	RSCA Futures	3	(0)
2022–2023	→ Heerenveen (loan)	22	(3)
2023–2024	RSCA Futures	13	(4)
2024–2025	Beerschot	25	(4)
2025–	Charleroi	29	(2)

International career
2016	Belgium U15	4	(0)
2016–2017	Belgium U16	14	(2)
2017–2018	Belgium U17	7	(2)
2019	Belgium U18	2	(0)
2019	Belgium U19	6	(3)
2020	Belgium U21	3	(0)
- * Club domestic league appearances and goals as of 1 June 2026

Antoine Colassin (born 26 February 2001) is a Belgian professional footballer who plays as a striker for Belgian Pro League club Charleroi.

== Club career ==
On 30 August 2022, Colassin joined Heerenveen in the Netherlands on a season-long loan with an option to buy.

On 30 August 2024, Colassin moved to Beerschot.

On 8 July 2025, Colassin signed a three-year contract with Charleroi.

== Career statistics ==
As of match played 18 December 2020

Appearances and goals by club, season and competition
Club	Season	League			National Cup (Note: Includes the Belgian Cup)		Europe		Other		Total	
Club	Season	Division	Apps	Goals	Apps	Goals	Apps	Goals	Apps	Goals	Apps	Goals
Anderlecht	2019–20	Belgian First Division A	4	3	0	0	—		—		4	3
Anderlecht	2020–21	Belgian First Division A	4	0	0	0	—		—		4	0
Career total			8	3	0	0	—		—		8	3
