= Glenn Claes =

Belgian footballer

Personal information
- Date of birth: 8 March 1994 (age 32)
- Place of birth: Lier, Belgium
- Height: 1.79 m (5 ft 10 in)
- Position: Midfielder

Team information
- Current team: Beerschot
- Number: 10

Youth career
- 2000–2006: Lyra
- 2006–2010: Lierse

Senior career*
Years	Team	Apps	(Gls)
2011–2013	Lierse	3	(0)
2013–2019	Mechelen	109	(5)
2018–2019	→ Lommel (loan)	29	(4)
2019–2020	Virton	12	(1)
2020–2023	RWDM	44	(7)
2023–2025	Lierse	28	

International career
2009	Belgium U15	4	(1)
2009–2010	Belgium U16	3	(0)
2010	Belgium U17	1	(0)
2011–2012	Belgium U18	4	(0)
2012	Belgium U19	5	(1)
- * Club domestic league appearances and goals as of 19 April 2026

Glenn Claes (born 8 March 1994) is a Belgian professional footballer who plays as a midfielder for Beerschot in the Challenger Pro League.

== Professional career ==
Born in Lier, Claes started playing football at Lyra at an early age, until the local professional club, Lierse, scouted him to their academy.

On 18 March 2012, Claes made his senior debut for the club when he was in the starting lineup against Mons, before being substituted in the 77th minute in the 1–1 draw.

In 2013, he signed with Mechelen. In the 2014–15 and 2015–16 seasons, he made more than 30 league appearances. Prior to the 2018–19 season, Claes was sent to Lommel on loan. After this loan, Claes signed a two-year contract with Virton on a free transfer.

In September 2020, it was announced that Claes had signed a two-year contract with RWDM in the Belgian First Division B.

On 16 May 2023, Claes signed a two-season contract with Lierse.

On 10 July 2025, Claes joined Beerschot on a one-season contract.

== Personal life ==
Claes is the son of the Belgian former Lyra and Lierse goalkeeper Eddy Claes.
