= Lukas Van Eenoo =

Belgian footballer

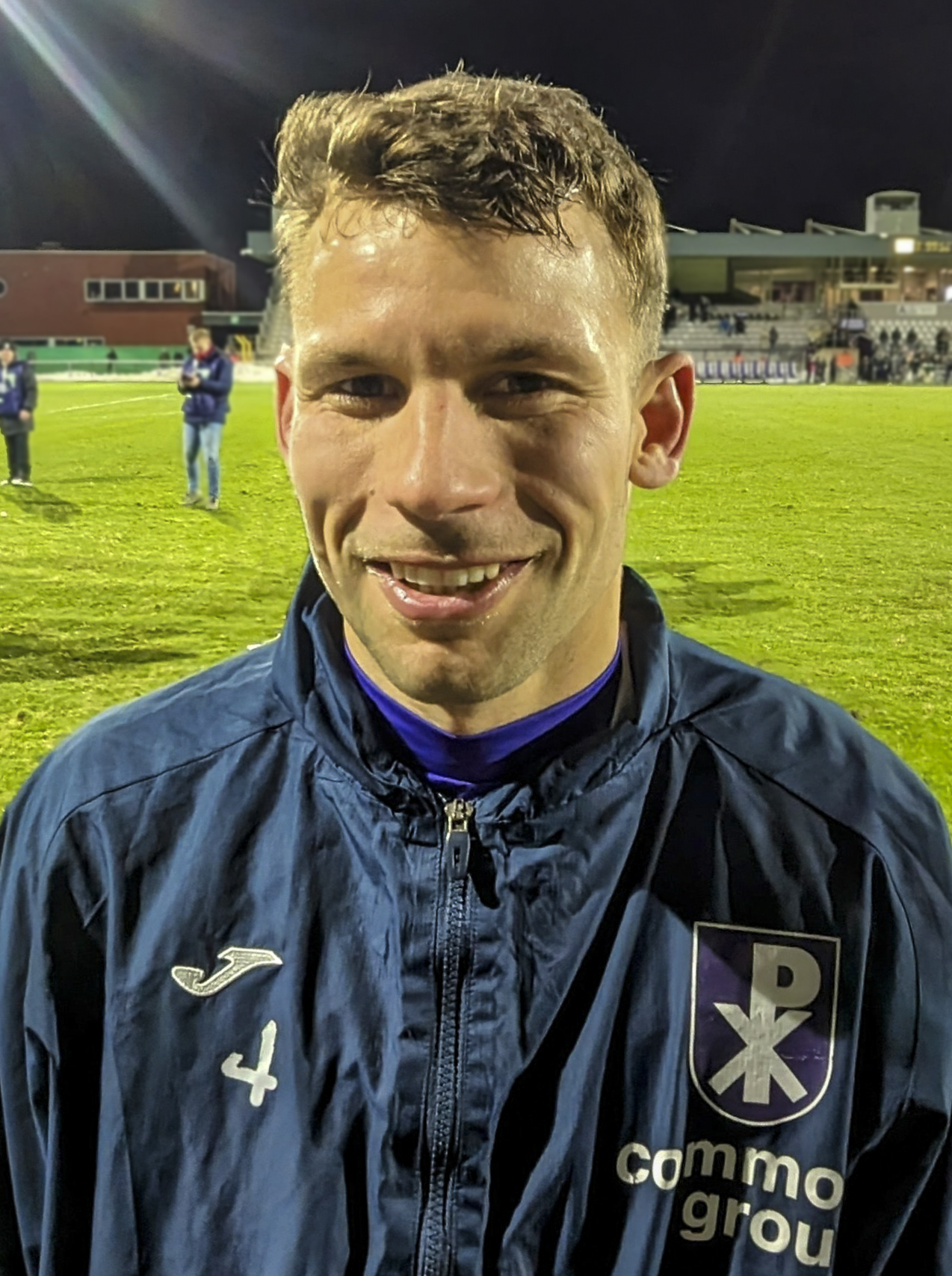
- Van Eenoo in 2024

Personal information
- Date of birth: 6 February 1991 (age 35)
- Place of birth: Bruges, Belgium
- Height: 1.75 m (5 ft 9 in)
- Position: Midfielder

Team information
- Current team: Beerschot
- Number: 8

Youth career
- 1997–2008: Cercle Brugge

Senior career*
Years	Team	Apps	(Gls)
2008–2014	Cercle Brugge	149	(12)
2014	→ OH Leuven (loan)	11	(1)
2014–2018	Kortrijk	49	(1)
2016–2017	→ Roeselare (loan)	22	(1)
2018	→ Westerlo (loan)	8	(2)
2018–2023	Westerlo	157	(23)
2024–2025	Patro Eisden Maasmechelen	41	(5)
2025–	Beerschot	31	(2)

International career
2007	Belgium U16	6	(0)
2007–2008	Belgium U17	7	(0)
2008–2009	Belgium U18	12	(1)
2009–2010	Belgium U19	13	(1)
2010–2011	Belgium U21	4	(0)
- * Club domestic league appearances and goals as of 19 April 2026

Lukas Van Eenoo (Dutch pronunciation: [ˈlykɑs fɑn ˈeːnoː]; (Note: In isolation, van is pronounced [vɑn].) born 6 February 1991) is a Belgian professional footballer who plays as a midfielder for Challenger Pro League club Beerschot.

== Career ==
Van Eenoo made his debut for the first team of Cercle Brugge during the Bruges derby against Club Brugge. He was a substitute for Honour Gombami. Van Eenoo also played for various Belgian national youth teams. On 22 July 2010, he scored his first senior team goal in a UEFA Europa League qualifying match against Turun Palloseura, thereby securing a place for his team in the third round of qualification.

On 22 July 2025, Van Eenoo signed with Beerschot for one year.

== Career statistics ==
As of match played 16 April 2022

Appearances and goals by club, season and competition
Club	Season	League			Cup		Other		Total	
Club	Season	Division	Apps	Goals	Apps	Goals	Apps	Goals	Apps	Goals
Cercle Brugge	2008–09	First Division	1	0	0	0	—		1	0
Cercle Brugge	2009–10	Pro League	13	0	4	1	—		17	1
Cercle Brugge	2010–11	Pro League	30	0	5	2	4 (Note: Appearances in the Europa League)	1	39	3
Cercle Brugge	2011–12	Pro League	28	8	2	0	—		30	8
Cercle Brugge	2012–13	Pro League	30	3	6	1	5 (Note: Appearances in the Pro League relegation play-offs)	0	41	4
Cercle Brugge	2013–14	Pro League	17	1	3	1	0	0	20	2
Cercle Brugge	Total		119	12	20	5	9	1	148	18
OH Leuven (loan)	2013–14	Pro League	11	1	—		4 (Note: Appearances in the Pro League relegation play-offs)	0	15	1
Kortrijk	2014–15	Pro League	32	1	2	0	—		34	1
Kortrijk	2015–16	Pro League	14	0	3	1	—		17	1
Kortrijk	2016–17	First Division A	0	0	0	0	—		0	0
Kortrijk	2017–18	First Division A	3	0	1	1	—		4	1
Kortrijk	Total		49	1	6	2	—		55	2
Roeselare (loan)	2016–17	First Division B	22	1	2	1	6 (Note: Appearances in the Europa League play-offs)	2	30	4
Westerlo (loan)	2017–18	First Division B	8	2	0	0	5 (Note: Appearances in the Relegation play-offs)	1	13	3
Westerlo	2018–19	First Division B	28	4	1	0	10	2	39	6
Westerlo	2019–20	First Division B	26	4	3	0	—		29	4
Westerlo	2020–21	First Division B	27	7	1	1	—		28	8
Westerlo	2021–22	First Division B	27	4	3	0	—		30	4
Westerlo	Total		108	19	8	1	10	2	126	22
Career total			317	36	36	9	34	6	387	51

== Honours ==
Cercle Brugge

- Belgian Cup runner-up: 2009–10, 2012–13

Westerlo

- Belgian First Division B: 2021–22
