= Tom Reyners =

Belgian footballer (born 2000)

Personal information
- Date of birth: 20 April 2000 (age 26)
- Place of birth: Bree, Belgium
- Height: 1.70 m (5 ft 7 in)
- Position: Left winger

Team information
- Current team: Lommel
- Number: 10

Youth career
- 2008–2009: Bree-Beek
- 2009–2012: MVV Maastricht
- 2012–2020: Genk

Senior career*
Years	Team	Apps	(Gls)
2020–2023	Beveren	36	(1)
2023–2025	Beerschot	51	(11)
2025–	Lommel	32	(4)

International career^{‡}
2015	Belgium U15	6	(0)
2015	Belgium U16	2	(1)
2018	Belgium U18	1	(0)
2018–2019	Belgium U19	7	(2)
- * Club domestic league appearances and goals as of 20 April 2026 ‡ National team caps and goals as of 28 December 2020

Tom Reyners (born 20 April 2000) is a Belgian professional footballer who plays as a winger for Challenger Pro League club Lommel.

== Professional career ==
A youth product of Genk, Reyners signed a professional contract with Waasland-Beveren in June 2020. Reyners made his professional debut with Waasland-Beveren in a 4-1 Belgian First Division A loss to S.V. Zulte Waregem on 22 August 2020.

On 7 July 2023, Reyners signed a two-year contract with Beerschot.

On 19 June 2025, Reyners moved to Lommel on a three-season deal.
