= K Beerschot VA =

Belgian professional football club

Beerschot
- Full name: Koninklijke Beerschot Voetbalclub Antwerpen
- Nicknames: De Kielse Ratten; De Mannekes; Purple White Army
- Founded: 2013; 13 years ago
- Ground: Olympisch Stadion; Antwerp, Belgium
- Capacity: 12,771
- Owner: Kinpoudou Holdings Inc.
- Chairman: Kazuaki Nakamura
- Head coach: Mohamed Messoudi
- League: Challenger Pro League
- 2025–26: Challenger Pro League, 3rd of 17
- Website: beerschot.be
Home colours	Away colours

Koninklijke Beerschot Voetbalclub Antwerpen (Dutch pronunciation: [ˈkoːnəŋkləkə ˈbeːrsxɔt ˈvudbɑlklʏp ˈɑntʋɛrpə(n)]), or simply Beerschot, is a Belgian professional football club located in Antwerp, that competes in the second-tier Challenger Pro League after relegation from top tier in 2024–25 season. In 2013, KFCO Wilrijk decided to integrate the identity of Beerschot AC when they were relegated in the 2012–13 season, not only through their league position but also due to losing their professional licence through financial issues, being officially declared bankrupt on 21 May 2013 and folding shortly afterwards. The club colours are purple and white, they play their games on the club's home ground the Olympic Stadium often referred to as 't Kiel.

== History ==
=== KFCO Wilrijk ===
The club was founded in 1921 as Football Club Wilrijk and joined The Belgian football association.

As a result of the introduction of a national third division in 1926, the club played national football for the first time in their then short existence. The club ended third last, leading to their relegation after just one season. In 1931 the number of participants in the divisions was increased, causing FC Wilrijk to be included on the national level for the second time. FC Wilrijk lasted two seasons before being relegated again.

In 1935 the club was promoted once more. Unlike their previous third division stays, FC Wilrijk showcased dominant football. This resulted in a 3rd position in the 1935–36 season and even becoming third division champions in the 1936–37 season. After winning their division the club was promoted to the second division lasting two seasons before being relegated in 1939. After a lengthy stay in the third division, FC Wilrijk was relegated to the Provincial division in 1949 which set a trend for the following decades.

In 1993 KFC Wilrijk merged with Olympia Wilrijk 72. This other Wilrijk-based club, was founded in 1972 and part of the Royal Belgian Football Association, being assigned the association number 7727. Both clubs shared forces as KFC Olympia Wilrijk and continued under KFC Wilrijks association number 155.

In 1994, the club reached the 4th division, playing national football for the first time in 45 years. In the 1995–96 season KFCO Olympia Wilrijk came in 3rd only two points short of standing victorious in their division. After eight years KFC Olympia Wilrijk ended third last, which led to being relegated. Their absence was short-lived however, as KFC Olympia Wilrijk was promoted the following year resulting in a three-year stay before being relegated. In 2008 the club was promoted again, only to be relegated in 2010.

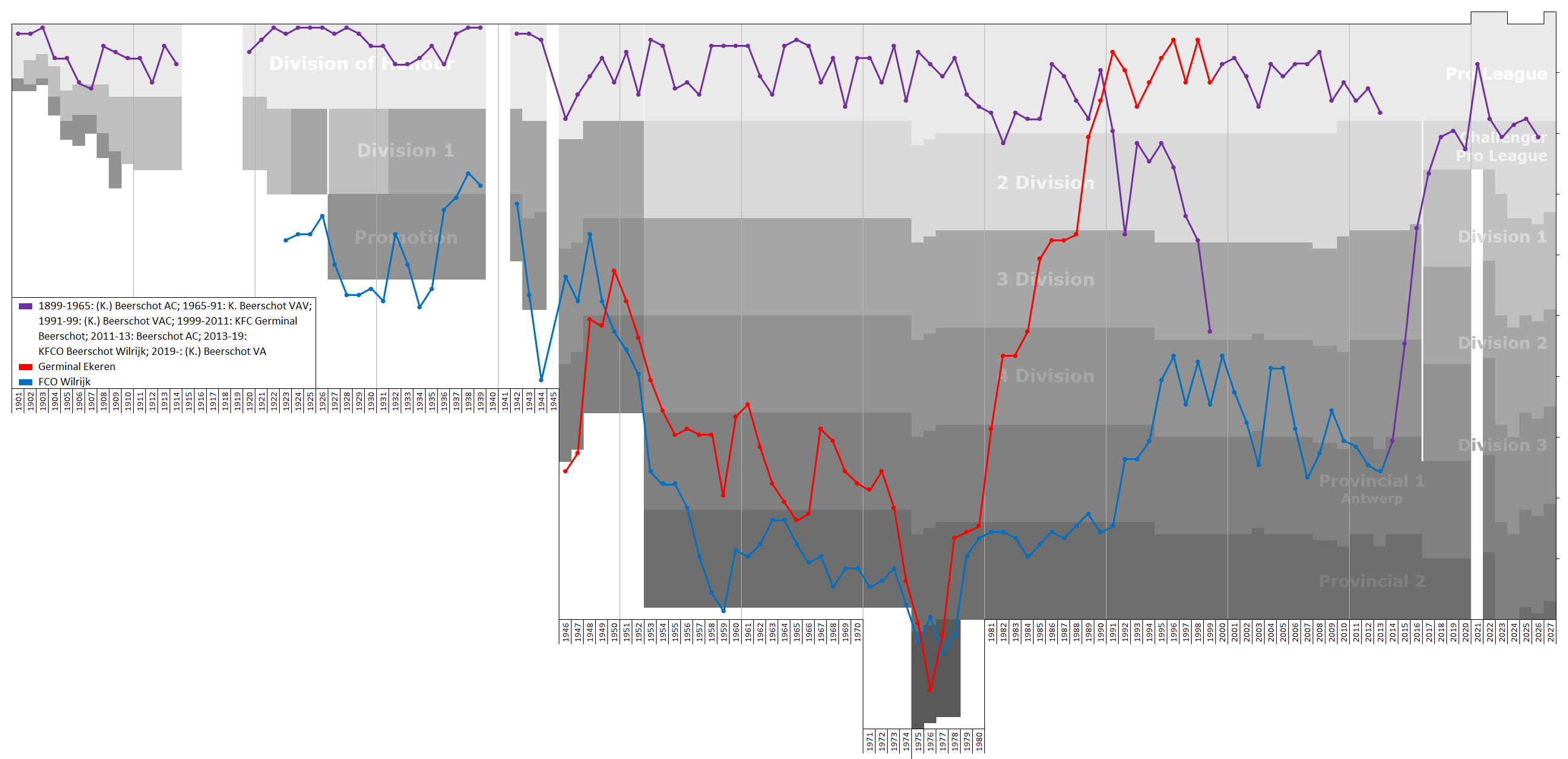
Historical league performance chart of Wilrijk and Beerschot

=== FCO Beerschot Wilrijk ===
After Beerschot AC's bankruptcy in 2013, KFCO Wilrijk decided to harbour its fans. KFCO Wilrijk followed up by incorporating the name Beerschot and their respective colours in their own identity. The KBVB however decided that due to the name change, the club was no longer eligible to use the handle "royal" in their club name. Hence the club's name is FCO Beerschot Wilrijk rather than KFCO Beerschot Wilrijk. In order to retrieve their "royal" status, FCO Beerschot Wilrijk filed a successful application in June 2017.

FCO Beerschot Wilrijk, became an instant success. Their season opener against Ternesse VV was attended by 8500 fans, which was a record for the Belgian provincial division at the time. This record was broken on 15 February 2014 during their game against fierce title contender FC De Kempen which was attended by 8982 fans and topped again, during their title game against KFC Katelijne-Waver on 22 March. This game was attended by almost 12000 fans and won by 5–0, gaining the club mathematic certainty about crowning themselves 2013–14 division champions.

Due to the club's high attendance – weekly attendance that tops several first division teams – KFCO Beerschot Wilrijk is required to play their home games at the Olympisch Stadion (city of Antwerp) to guarantee the safety of their fans. This is the home ground of the fallen Beerschot VAC. The club reached an average of 7000 fans at home games during its first season in the 1st division of the province of Antwerp. The club's success and vibe often lead to opponents renting bigger stadiums because the prospected attendance exceeds their own stadium capacity.

Old logo used until 2019 when the name was changed from Beerschot Wilrijk to Beerschot

For the 2014–15 season, FCO Beerschot Wilrijk was promoted to the 4th division in Belgian national football. In mid-March 2015, they held a 10-point lead over their closest rival. They were promoted to third division as champions of their group. In 2015–2016 they became champions of the third division after a sensational winning goal in the last minute of their last game. In 2016–2017 they became the first champion of the new '1st Amateur League' and gained promotion to the Proximus League, the second tier of Belgian football.

In February 2018, Saudi prince Abdullah bin Musa'ad bin Abdulaziz Al Saud, owner of the English Premier League side Sheffield United, announced his investment in Beerschot alongside Belgian construction company DCA.

=== Beerschot ===
In 2019, the club changed its name to Beerschot, and also changed the club logo.

They played in the Challenger Pro League for three seasons, and played the promotion final each year. Finally, after losing to Cercle Brugge K.S.V. and K.V. Mechelen, they gained promotion to the Belgian Belgian First Division A at the end of the 2019-2020 season.

In 2021–22, Beerschot were relegated to the Challenger Pro League, the second tier of Belgian football after finishing 18th in the Belgian Pro League

In 2023–24, Beerschot secured promotion to the Belgian Pro League for the 2024–25 season after a two year absence, after winning the Challenger Pro League

== Results ==
Season	League									Division	Points	Remarks	Belgian Cup
	I	II	III	IV	P.I	P.II	P.III	P.IV					
2013–14					1					First Provincial League	70	Promotion.	
2014–15				1						Fourth Division C	71	Promotion.	Fifth round
2015–16			1							Third Division B	71	Promotion.	Third round
Reformation of the Belgian football league system*
	IA	IB	IAm	IIAm	IIIAm	P.I	P.II	P.III	P.IV				
2016–17			1							First Amateur Division	53	Promotion. Ranked first with 80 points.	Fifth round
2017–18		3								First Division B	46	Winner of the first period title with 29 points.	Sixth round
2018–19		2								First Division B	54	Winner of the second period title with 30 points.	Seventh Round
2019–20		5								First Division B	43	Promoted. Winner of second period with 26 points.	Sixth round
2020–21	9									First Division A	47		Seventh Round
2021–22	18									First Division A	16	Relegation to Challenger Pro League	Seventh Round
2022–23		3								Challenger Pro League	49		Sixth round
2023–24		1								Challenger Pro League	56	Promotion to Belgian Pro League	Seventh round
2024–25	16									Belgian Pro League			Quarterfinals

- As a result, KFCO BW remained in the third division.

== Current squad ==
As of 3 September 2026

Note: Flags indicate national team as defined under FIFA eligibility rules; some limited exceptions apply. Players may hold more than one non-FIFA nationality.

No.	Pos.	Nation	Player
1	GK	BEL	Xavier Gies
3	DF	BEL	Milan Govaers
4	DF	NED	Brian Plat
5	DF	BEL	Sem Audoor
6	DF	BEL	Bas Van den Eynden
7	FW	NED	Toshio Lake
8	MF	BEL	Lukas Van Eenoo
9	FW	BEL	Jelle Vossen
10	MF	BEL	Glenn Claes
11	MF	TUR	Emre Uzun
13	GK	JPN	William Popp (on loan from Shonan Bellmare)
15	FW	UGA	Arnold Vula
17	MF	BEL	Axl Van Himbeeck

No.	Pos.	Nation	Player
19	DF	BEL	Jordan Bustin
20	MF	BEL	Mats Rits
21	FW	TUN	Anas Haj Mohamed
24	DF	BUL	Edisson Jordanov
25	FW	RSA	Siviwe Magidigidi
26	GK	BEL	Brent Stevens
32	FW	GRN	D'Margio Wright-Phillips
41	MF	JPN	Takatora Einaga
45	FW	SRB	Ensar Brahić
46	MF	BEL	Abian Arslan
50	FW	BEL	Kindo Suma
76	DF	NED	Dennis Gyamfi
78	MF	JPN	Genki Haraguchi

=== Out on loan ===
Note: Flags indicate national team as defined under FIFA eligibility rules; some limited exceptions apply. Players may hold more than one non-FIFA nationality.

No. / Pos. / Nation / Player; — / MF / BEL / Xander Joosen (at KVC Wilrijk until 30 June 2027)	No. / Pos. / Nation / Player; — / MF / URU / Thiago Lugano (at Nardò until 30 June 2027)

== Coaching staff ==
Position	Name
Head coach	(Belgium) Mohamed Messoudi
Assistant coach	(Netherlands) Dirk Heesen (Belgium) Frank Magerman (Belgium) Diego Poppe
Goalkeeping coach	(Netherlands) Raymond Mulder
Video analyst	(Belgium) Patrice Pfeiffer
Head of performance	(Belgium) Gianni Chiffi
Doctor	(Belgium) Dr. Kris Peeters
Physiotherapist	(Belgium) Olivier Meul (Belgium) Linske Peeters (Belgium) Benny Begine
Managing director	(Belgium) Gunther Dieltjens
Technical director	(Belgium) Sander Van Praet (Belgium) Jan Van Winckel

== Managers ==
Season	Manager
2013–2014	(Belgium) Urbain Spaenhoven
2014–2015	(Belgium) Urbain Spaenhoven
2015–2016	(Belgium) Urbain Spaenhoven/ (Netherlands) Dennis van Wijk
2016–2017	(Belgium) Marc Brys
2017–2018	(Belgium) Marc Brys
2018–2019	(Belgium) Stijn Vreven
2019–2021	(Argentina) Hernán Losada
2021	(Belgium) William Still
2021	(Belgium) Peter Maes
2021–2022	(Argentina) Javier Torrente
2022	(Belgium) Greg Vanderidt
2022–2023	(Austria) Andreas Wieland
2023–2025	(Netherlands) Dirk Kuyt
2025–	(Belgium) Mohamed Messoudi

== Club captains ==
Season	Player
2013–2014	(Belgium) Davy De Smedt
2014–2015	(Belgium) Davy De Smedt
2015–2016	(Belgium) Davy De Smedt/Hannes Meeus
2016–2017	(Belgium) Jaric Schaessens
2018–2019	(Belgium) Tom Van Hyfte
2019–2021	(Belgium) Mike Vanhamel
2022–2026	(Belgium) Ryan Sanusi
2026-present	(Belgium) Lukas Van Eenoo

== Top scorers ==
Season	Player	Goals
2013–2014	(Belgium) Peter Nijs	28
2014–2015	(Curaçao) Dyron Daal	18
2015–2016	(Argentina) Hernán Losada	10
2016–2017	(Argentina) Hernán Losada	15
2017–2018	(Argentina) Hernán Losada	10
2018–2019	(Belgium) Dante Vanzeir	16
2019–2020	(Austria) Raphael Holzhauser	8
2020–2021	(Austria) Raphael Holzhauser	16
2021–2022	(Belgium) Joren Dom	5
2022–2023	(Belgium) Thibo Baeten	13
2023–2024	(Belgium) Tom Reyners	10
2024–2025	(Saudi Arabia) Marwan Al-Sahafi	5
2025–2026	(Netherlands) Rajiv van La Parra	6

== Affiliated clubs ==
The following clubs are currently affiliated with:

- (India) Kerala United FC (2020–present)
- (United Arab Emirates) Al-Hilal United (2020–present)
- (France) LB Châteauroux (2020–present)

The following clubs were previously affiliated with Beerschot:

- (England) Sheffield United FC (2020–2024)
