= 2016–17 Nottingham Forest F.C. season =

English football club season

Nottingham Forest
2016–17 season
- Owner: Fawaz Al-Hasawi (until 18 May); Evangelos Marinakis (80%); Sokratis Kominakis (20%) (from 18 May)
- Chairman: Fawaz Al-Hasawi (until 18 May); Nicholas Randall QC (from 18 May)
- Manager: Philippe Montanier (until 14 January); Gary Brazil (caretaker from 14 January to 14 March); Mark Warburton (from 14 March)
- Stadium: City Ground
- Championship: 21st
- FA Cup: Third round
- EFL Cup: Third round
- Top goalscorer: League: Britt Assombalonga (14); All: Britt Assombalonga (14)
- Highest home attendance: 28,567 (vs. Arsenal, EFL Cup third round, 20 September)
- Lowest home attendance: 15,770 (vs. Rotherham United, EFL Championship, 31 January)
Home colours	Away colours

The 2016–17 season was Nottingham Forest's 151st season in existence and 9th consecutive season in the Championship since promotion in 2007–08. In addition to the Championship, the club participated in the FA Cup and the newly rebranded EFL Cup. The season covers the period from 1 July 2016 to 30 June 2017.

On 18 May a change of ownership of Nottingham Forest Football Club from Fawaz Al-Hasawi to a Greek consortium, led by Olympiacos owner and shipping magnate Evangelos Marinakis, was completed as Fawaz Al-Hasawi sold 100% of his stake in the club for an undisclosed sum. Marinakis completed the deal in partnership with Sokratis Kominakis, and the duo immediately announced the appointments of leading sports lawyer Nicholas Randall QC as Chairman, Olympiacos' Managing Director Loannis Vrentzos as CEO, and David Cook, formerly of Celtic and Everton, as Chief Commercial Officer.

== First team squad ==
As of 22 May 2017

No.	Player	Nationality	Date of birth (age)	Previous club	Joined first team	Player contracted until
Goalkeepers
26	Dimitar Evtimov	BUL	7 September 1993 (aged 23)	Chavdar Etropole	2011	2019
30	Stephen Henderson	IRL	2 May 1988 (aged 29)	Charlton Athletic	2016	2019
38	Vladimir Stojković	SRB	28 July 1983 (aged 33)	Maccabi Haifa	2016	2018
43	Jordan Smith	ENG	8 December 1994 (aged 22)	Academy	2016	2020
Defenders
2	Eric Lichaj	USA	17 November 1988 (aged 28)	Aston Villa	2013	2018
3	Daniel Pinillos	ESP	22 October 1992 (aged 24)	Córdoba	2015	2017
4	Michael Mancienne	ENG	8 January 1988 (aged 29)	Hamburger SV	2014	2019
5	Matt Mills	ENG	14 July 1986 (aged 30)	Bolton Wanderers	2015	2018
6	Armand Traoré	SEN	8 October 1989 (aged 27)	Queens Park Rangers	2016	2019
13	Danny Fox	SCO	29 May 1986 (aged 31)	Southampton	2014	2018
17	Hildeberto Pereira	POR	2 March 1996 (aged 21)	Benfica B	2016	2017
25	Jack Hobbs	ENG	18 August 1988 (aged 28)	Hull City	2014	2018
27	Damien Perquis	POL	10 April 1984 (aged 33)	Toronto FC	2016	2018
28	Thomas Lam	FIN	18 December 1993 (aged 23)	PEC Zwolle	2016	2019
42	Joe Worrall	ENG	10 January 1997 (aged 20)	Academy	2016	2020
Midfielders
8	Chris Cohen	ENG	5 March 1987 (aged 30)	Yeovil Town	2007	2018
10	João Teixeira	POR	6 February 1994 (aged 23)	Benfica	2017	2017
11	Ben Osborn	ENG	5 August 1994 (aged 22)	Academy	2012	2020
15	Aaron Tshibola	ENG	2 January 1995 (aged 22)	Aston Villa	2017	2017
18	Mustapha Carayol	GAM	4 September 1988 (aged 28)	Middlesbrough	2016	2018
19	Jamie Ward	NIR	12 May 1986 (aged 31)	Derby County	2015	2019
20	Licá	POR	8 September 1988 (aged 28)	Porto	2016	2018
21	Gboly Ariyibi	USA	18 January 1995 (aged 22)	Chesterfield	2017	2020
22	Pajtim Kasami	SUI	2 June 1992 (aged 25)	Olympiacos	2016	2017
24	David Vaughan	WAL	18 February 1983 (aged 34)	Sunderland	2014	2018
41	Matty Cash	ENG	7 August 1997 (aged 19)	Academy	2016	2021
Strikers
7	Matty Fryatt	ENG	5 March 1986 (aged 31)	Hull City	2014	2017
9	Britt Assombalonga	COD	6 December 1992 (aged 24)	Peterborough United	2014	2021
12	Nicolao Dumitru	ITA	12 October 1991 (aged 25)	Napoli	2016	2017
16	Zach Clough	ENG	8 March 1995 (aged 22)	Bolton Wanderers	2017	2021
39	Apostolos Vellios	GRE	8 January 1992 (aged 25)	Iraklis	2016	2020
45	Ben Brereton	ENG	18 April 1999 (aged 18)	Academy	2017	2021
50	Ross McCormack	SCO	18 August 1986 (aged 30)	Aston Villa	2017	2017

=== New contracts ===
Date	Position	Nationality	Player	Length of contract	Player contracted until	Reference
25 July 2016	DF	SCO	Danny Fox	1 year	2018	
5 August 2016	MF	ENG	Matty Cash	1 year	2019	
5 August 2016	MF	ENG	Ben Osborn	1 year	2020	
2 September 2016	ST	DRC	Britt Assombalonga	2 years	2021	
31 December 2016	ST	ENG	Ben Brereton	Undisclosed	Undisclosed	
27 February 2017	DF	ENG	Joe Worrall	3.5 years	2020	
27 February 2017	MF	ENG	Ryan Yates	2 years	2019	
3 March 2017	MF	ENG	Matty Cash	4 years	2021	
4 April 2017	GK	ENG	Jordan Smith	3 years	2020	
28 April 2017	DF	ENG	Michael Mancienne	2 years	2019	
11 May 2017 (Note: Cohen's contract extension was reported as early as 7 May, but was not confirmed by the club until 11 May.)	MF	ENG	Chris Cohen	1 year	2018	
22 May 2017	MF	WAL	David Vaughan	1 year	2018	
12 June 2017	MF	ENG	Jorge Grant	3 years	2020	
22 June 2017	ST	ENG	Ben Brereton	4 years	2021	

== Player transfers ==
(Note: Please note that this section includes players in or out from date commencing 9 June 2016; the date that the UK Summer transfer window opened.)

=== Transfers in ===
First team
Date	Position	Nationality	Name	From	Transfer fee	Reference
29 June 2016	ST	GRE	Apostolos Vellios	Iraklis	Undisclosed (Note: The Nottingham Post reported Vellios' fee to be €1,200,000; approximately £950,000 in Pound Sterling.)	
8 July 2016	DF	FIN	Thomas Lam	Zwolle	Free transfer	
22 July 2016	GK	IRL	Stephen Henderson	Charlton Athletic	Free transfer	
22 July 2016	DF	POL	Damien Perquis	Free agent	Free transfer	
1 August 2016	DF	SEN	Armand Traoré	Free agent	Free transfer	
24 August 2016	GK	SRB	Vladimir Stojković	Maccabi Haifa	Undisclosed	
31 August 2016	MF	GAM	Mustapha Carayol	Middlesbrough	Free transfer	
31 August 2016	MF	POR	Licá	Porto	Undisclosed (Note: The Nottingham Post reported Licá's transfer fee to have been £300,000.)	
7 September 2016	ST	DEN	Nicklas Bendtner	Free agent	Free transfer	
31 January 2017	ST	ENG	Zach Clough	Bolton Wanderers	Undisclosed (Note: Clough's transfer fee was reported by the Nottingham Post to be greater than £3,000,000.)	
31 January 2017	MF	USA	Gboly Ariyibi	Chesterfield	Undisclosed	

Academy
Date	Position	Nationality	Name	From	Transfer fee	Reference
21 June 2016	GK	LAT	Rudolfs Soloha	Riga Football School	Undisclosed	
6 July 2016	MF	ENG	Rob Worrall	Harrogate Town	Nominal Fee	
28 July 2016	GK	AUS	Chris Marques	Free agent	Free transfer	
23 September 2016	ST	ENG	Lewis Walters	Free agent	Free transfer	

=== Loans in ===
Date	Position	Nationality	Name	From	Loan Expired	Reference
22 July 2016	DF	POR	Hildeberto Pereira	Benfica B	End of Season	
3 August 2016	MF	SUI	Pajtim Kasami	Olympiacos	End of Season	
31 August 2016	ST	ITA	Nicolao Dumitru	Napoli	End of Season	
30 January 2017	MF	ENG	Aaron Tshibola	Aston Villa	End of Season	
31 January 2017	MF	POR	João Teixeira	Benfica	End of Season	
31 January 2017	ST	SCO	Ross McCormack	Aston Villa	End of Season	

=== Transfers out ===
First team
Date	Position	Nationality	Name	To	Transfer fee	Reference
1 July 2016	MF	SCO	Chris Burke	Free agent (Later joined Ross County)	Released	
1 July 2016	MF	IRE	Andy Reid	Retired		
1 July 2016	MF	GER	Robert Tesche	Birmingham City	Released	
1 July 2016	DF	ENG	Kelvin Wilson	Free agent (Later joined Rotherham United)	Released	
13 August 2016	GK	NED	Dorus de Vries	Celtic	Undisclosed	
27 August 2016	ST	ENG	Jamie Paterson	Bristol City	Undisclosed	
28 August 2016	MF	SCO	Oliver Burke	RB Leipzig	Undisclosed (Note: Burke's transfer fee was reported by the BBC to be £13,000,000; a record fee for a Scottish player and a club record sale for Nottingham Forest Football Club.)	
31 August 2016	ST	RSA	Lars Veldwijk	K.V. Kortrijk	Undisclosed	
1 September 2016	ST	ATG	Dexter Blackstock	Free agent (Later joined Rotherham United)	Contract terminated	
20 January 2017	MF	ENG	Henri Lansbury	Aston Villa	Undisclosed (Note: Lansbury's transfer fee was reported by the Nottingham Post and Sky Sports to have been £3,000,000.)	
6 March 2017	ST	DEN	Nicklas Bendtner	Rosenborg	Undisclosed	

Academy
Date	Position	Nationality	Name	To	Transfer Fee	Reference
15 June 2016	ST	BUL	Nikolay Todorov	Heart of Midlothian	Released	
1 July 2016	MF	ENG	Liam Adams	Free agent (Later joined Boston United)	Released	
1 July 2016	ST	ENG	Aidan Austin	Free agent (Later joined AFC Sudbury)	Released	
1 July 2016	GK	IRE	Joe Boyd	Free agent (Later joined Carson–Newman Eagles)	Released	
1 July 2016	MF	New Zealand	Dylan Burns	Free agent (Later joined Tasman United)	Released	
1 July 2016	GK	ENG	Richard Dearle	Free agent (Later joined Embry–Riddle Eagles)	Released	
1 July 2016	DF	IRE	Ismael Diallo	Free agent (Later joined Dudley Town)	Released	
1 July 2016	MF	ENG	Tom Gamblen	Free agent	Released	
1 July 2016	DF	ENG	Jack Kelly	Free agent (Later joined Hemel Hempstead Town)	Released	
1 July 2016	MF	ENG	Josh Rees	Free agent (Later joined Chelmsford City)	Released	
1 July 2016	ST	ENG	Luke Thomas	Free agent	Released	
1 July 2016	ST	ENG	Kasheme Walton	Free agent	Released	
31 August 2016	MF	LTU	Deimantas Petravičius	Zagłębie Lubin	Free transfer	
5 June 2017	MF	NIR	Kyle McClean	St Johnstone	Released	

=== Loans out ===
Date loaned	Position	Nationality	Name	To	Loan expired	Reference
29 July 2016	ST	IRL	Gerry McDonagh	Wrexham	13 January 2017	
26 August 2016	MF	ENG	Ryan Yates	Barrow	9 January 2017	
31 August 2016	GK	BUL	Dimitar Evtimov	Olhanense	13 January 2017	
31 August 2016	DF	SCO	Alex Iacovitti	Mansfield Town	13 January 2017	
31 August 2016	ST	ENG	Tyler Walker	Stevenage	13 January 2017	
31 August 2016	MF	NIR	Jamie Ward	Burton Albion	20 January 2017	
25 November 2016	GK	SWE	Tim Erlandsson	Barrow	25 December 2016	
17 January 2017	ST	ENG	Tyler Walker	Port Vale	End of season	
20 January 2017	GK	SWE	Tim Erlandsson	AFC Eskilstuna	End of Allsvenskan season	
21 January 2017	ST	IRL	Gerry McDonagh	Cambridge United	End of season	
31 January 2017	MF	ENG	Jorge Grant	Notts County	End of season	
31 January 2017	MF	ENG	Ryan Yates	Shrewsbury Town	End of season	
6 February 2017	MF	POR	Licá	Estoril	End of season	
24 February 2017	ST	ENG	James Thorne	Macclesfield Town	24 March 2017	
23 March 2017	GK	ENG	Jordan Wright	Alfreton Town	End of season	

== Pre-season friendlies ==
9 July 2016 Friendly	Tottenham Hotspur	3–0	Nottingham Forest	Enfield
	Son 3'; Carroll 7'; Pritchard 88'	Report

12 July 2016 Friendly	Millwall	1–2	Nottingham Forest	Portugal
	Philpot (?)	Report	18' Blackstock; 49' Burke

15 July 2016 Friendly	Braga	0–3	Nottingham Forest	Portugal
19:30 CEST		Report	51' Lansbury; 73' Iacovitti; 90' Burke	Stadium: Estádio da Nora

19 July 2016 Friendly	Port Vale	0–2	Nottingham Forest	Burslem
19:45 CEST		Report	40' Mills; 56' Assombalonga	Stadium: Vale Park

23 July 2016 Friendly	Notts County	1–2	Nottingham Forest	Nottingham
15:00 BST	Rodman 65'	Report	57' Osborn; 77' Paterson	Stadium: Meadow Lane; Attendance: 9,007

30 July 2016 Friendly	Nottingham Forest	1–2	Hull City	West Bridgford
15:00	Burke 87'	Report	5' 17' Diomande	Stadium: City Ground; Attendance: 3,777; Referee: Lee Collins

== Competitions ==
=== Championship ===
==== League table ====
Pos	Team	Pld	W	D	L	GF	GA	GD	Pts	Promotion, qualification or relegation
19	Birmingham City	46	13	14	19	45	64	−19	53	
20	Burton Albion	46	13	13	20	49	63	−14	52	
21	Nottingham Forest	46	14	9	23	62	72	−10	51	
22	Blackburn Rovers (R)	46	12	15	19	53	65	−12	51	Relegation to EFL League One
23	Wigan Athletic (R)	46	10	12	24	40	57	−17	42	Relegation to EFL League One

Source: English Football League, Soccerway
Rules for classification: 1) Points; 2) Goal difference; 3) Number of goals scored; 4) Points in head-to-head matches; 5) Goal difference in head-to-head matches; 6) Goals scored in head-to-head matches; 7) Play-off.
(R) Relegated

==== Result summary ====
Overall								Home						Away					
Pld	W	D	L	GF	GA	GD	Pts	W	D	L	GF	GA	GD	W	D	L	GF	GA	GD
46	14	9	23	62	72	−10	51	12	4	7	42	30	+12	2	5	16	20	42	−22

Last updated: 31 August 2017.

==== Results by matchday ====
Matchday	1	2	3	4	5	6	7	8	9	10	11	12	13	14	15	16	17	18	19	20	21	22	23	24	25	26	27	28	29	30	31	32	33	34	35	36	37	38	39	40	41	42	43	44	45	46
Ground	H	A	A	H	H	A	A	H	A	H	A	H	A	H	A	H	A	A	H	A	H	H	A	A	H	A	H	A	H	H	A	A	H	A	H	H	A	H	A	A	H	H	A	H	A	H
Result	W	L	L	W	W	D	D	L	L	D	L	W	L	L	L	D	W	W	W	L	D	L	L	L	L	D	W	L	W	W	L	L	L	D	W	L	L	D	D	L	W	L	L	W	L	W
Position	4	16	19	11	7	10	10	13	15	15	18	15	15	19	20	20	18	17	13	16	16	17	18	18	20	20	19	19	19	16	18	18	19	19	18	18	20	20	20	20	19	20	21	20	21	21

Updated to match(es) played on 31 August 2017. Source:
A = Away; H = Home; W = Win; D = Draw; L = Loss

==== Matches ====
6 August 2016 1	Nottingham Forest	4–3	Burton Albion	West Bridgford
15:00 BST	Assombalonga 23' 77'; Lam 45'; Burke 49'	Report	27' Akins; 30' Dyer; 90' Naylor	Stadium: City Ground; Attendance: 23,012 (1,652 away); Referee: Andy Woolmer

12 August 2016 2	Brighton & Hove Albion	3–0	Nottingham Forest	Falmer
19:45 BST	Knockaert 36'; Murray 68' 82'	Report		Stadium: Falmer Stadium; Attendance: 25,748 (1,235 away); Referee: Andrew Madley

16 August 2016 3	Brentford	1–0	Nottingham Forest	Hounslow
19:45 BST	Hogan 28'	Report	(yellow card) 60' (yellow-red card) 87' Perquis	Stadium: Griffin Park; Attendance: 10,004 (1,614 away); Referee: Tim Robinson

20 August 2016 4	Nottingham Forest	4–3	Wigan Athletic	West Bridgford
15:00 BST	Assombalonga 6'; Burke 53' 78'; Lam 90'	Report	11' Jacobs; 65' 86' Grigg	Stadium: City Ground; Attendance: 17,750 (980 away); Referee: James Linington

27 August 2016 5	Nottingham Forest	3–1	Leeds United	West Bridgford
15:00 BST	Kasami 16'; Perquis 71'; Burke 90'	Report	83' Phillips	Stadium: City Ground; Attendance: 20,995 (1,925 away); Referee: Geoff Eltringham

11 September 2016 6	Aston Villa	2–2	Nottingham Forest	Birmingham
13:15 BST	McCormack 72'; Gestede 74'	Report	57' Vellios; 87' Lansbury; (yellow card) 86' (yellow-red card) 88' Pereira	Stadium: Villa Park; Attendance: 30,619 (2,869 away); Referee: Simon Hooper

14 September 2016 7	Rotherham United	2–2	Nottingham Forest	Rotherham
19:45 BST	Taylor 30' 87'	Report	76' Mills; 85' Vellios	Stadium: AESSEAL New York Stadium; Attendance: 10,243 (2,138 away); Referee: Peter Bankes

17 September 2016 8	Nottingham Forest	1–2	Norwich City	West Bridgford
15:00 BST	Vellios 40'	Report	52' Howson; 66' Dorrans	Stadium: City Ground; Attendance: 20,323 (1,924 away); Referee: Chris Kavanagh

25 September 2016 9	Sheffield Wednesday	2–1	Nottingham Forest	Sheffield
15:00 BST	Lee 65' 90'	Report	35' Lansbury	Stadium: Hillsborough Stadium; Attendance: 27,350 (2,617 away); Referee: Kevin Friend

27 September 2016 10	Nottingham Forest	1–1	Fulham	West Bridgford
19:45 BST	Bendtner 60'	Report	72' Cairney	Stadium: City Ground; Attendance: 17,388 (453 away); Referee: Darren Bond

1 October 2016 11	Bristol City	2–1	Nottingham Forest	Bristol
15:00 BST	Abraham 65'; Paterson 68'	Report	33' Vellios	Stadium: Ashton Gate Stadium; Attendance: 18,922 (1,429 away); Referee: Scott Duncan

14 October 2016 12	Nottingham Forest	3–1	Birmingham City	West Bridgford
19:45 BST	Lichaj 33'; Vellios 63'; Pereira 83'	Report	71' Jutkiewicz	Stadium: City Ground; Attendance: 19,208 (1,957 away); Referee: Jeremy Simpson

18 October 2016 13	Blackburn Rovers	2–1	Nottingham Forest	Blackburn
19:45 BST	Gallagher 11' 44'	Report	90' Perquis; (yellow card) 9' (yellow-red card) 90' Pereira	Stadium: Ewood Park; Attendance: 10,462 (868 away); Referee: Tim Robinson

22 October 2016 14	Nottingham Forest	1–2	Cardiff City	West Bridgford
17:30 BST	Lam (red card) 58'; Lansbury 90' (pen.)	Report	28' Gunnarsson; 39' Ralls	Stadium: City Ground; Attendance: 16,539 (347 away); Referee: Andy Woolmer

29 October 2016 15	Reading	2–0	Nottingham Forest	Reading
15:00 BST	McCleary 10'; Gunter 62'	Report		Stadium: Madejski Stadium; Attendance: 17,093 (1,805 away); Referee: Andy Davies

5 November 2016 16	Nottingham Forest	1–1	Queens Park Rangers	West Bridgford
15:00 GMT	Assombalonga 38'; Pereira (yellow card) 65' (yellow-red card) 71'	Report	(yellow card) 11' (yellow-red card) 34' Henry; 85' Sylla	Stadium: City Ground; Attendance: 20,043 (1,431 away); Referee: Keith Stroud

19 November 2016 17	Ipswich Town	0–2	Nottingham Forest	Ipswich
17:30 GMT		Report	1' 45' Assombalonga	Stadium: Portman Road Stadium; Attendance: 15,417 (1,477 away); Referee: Peter Bankes

25 November 2016 18	Barnsley	2–5	Nottingham Forest	Barnsley
19:45 GMT	Winnall 5'; Watkins 14' (red card) 66'	Report	13' 45' 82' (pen.) Lansbury; 24' Vellios; 63' Osborn	Stadium: Oakwell Stadium; Attendance: 13,180 (1,165 away); Referee: Oliver Langford

2 December 2016 19	Nottingham Forest	2–1	Newcastle United	West Bridgford
19:45 GMT	Bendtner 52'; Lascelles 86' (o.g.)	Report	(red card) 33' Shelvey; 45' Ritchie; (red card) 45' Dummett	Stadium: City Ground; Attendance: 21,317 (1,866 away); Referee: Steve Martin

11 December 2016 20	Derby County	3–0	Nottingham Forest	Derby
12:00 GMT	Bendtner 33' (o.g.); Ince 55'; Hughes 64'	Report		Stadium: iPro Stadium; Attendance: 32,600 (3,115 away); Referee: Chris Kavanagh

14 December 2016 21	Nottingham Forest	1–1	Preston North End	West Bridgford
19:45 GMT	Maxwell 68' (o.g.)	Report	45' Makienok	Stadium: City Ground; Attendance: 15,864 (709 away); Referee: Tony Harrington

17 December 2016 22	Nottingham Forest	0–2	Wolverhampton Wanderers	West Bridgford
15:00 GMT		Report	40' Costa; 79' Cavaleiro	Stadium: City Ground; Attendance: 19,037 (1,923 away); Referee: Graham Scott

26 December 2016 23	Huddersfield Town	2–1	Nottingham Forest	Huddersfield
15:00 GMT	Stojković 53' (o.g.); Mancienne 57' (o.g.)	Report	25' Pereira; (yellow card) 52' (yellow-red card) 89' Mancienne	Stadium: John Smith's Stadium; Attendance: 22,100 (1,902 away); Referee: Chris Kavanagh

30 December 2016 24	Newcastle United	3–1	Nottingham Forest	Newcastle upon Tyne
19:45 GMT	Ritchie 4'; Gayle 63' 80'	Report	29' Dumitru; (yellow card) 59' (yellow-red card) 60' Mills	Stadium: St. James' Park; Attendance: 52,228 (2,305 away); Referee: Keith Stroud

2 January 2017 25	Nottingham Forest	0–1	Barnsley	West Bridgford
15:00 GMT		Report	89' Hourihane	Stadium: City Ground; Attendance: 22,105 (1,876 away); Referee: James Linington

14 January 2017 26	Birmingham City	0–0	Nottingham Forest	Birmingham
15:00 GMT		Report		Stadium: St Andrew's; Attendance: 18,041 (1,474 away); Referee: Peter Bankes

21 January 2017 27	Nottingham Forest	1–0	Bristol City	West Bridgford
15:00 GMT	Osborn 67'	Report		Stadium: City Ground; Attendance: 17,418 (981 away); Referee: Darren Bond

25 January 2017 28	Leeds United	2–0	Nottingham Forest	Leeds
19:45 GMT	Wood 55'; Doukara 74'	Report		Stadium: Elland Road Stadium; Attendance: 24,838 (567 away); Referee: Tony Harrington

31 January 2017 29	Nottingham Forest	2–0	Rotherham United	West Bridgford
19:45 GMT	Assombalonga 50' (pen.) 71'	Report		Stadium: City Ground; Attendance: 15,770 (393 away); Referee: Simon Hooper

4 February 2017 30	Nottingham Forest	2–1	Aston Villa	West Bridgford
17:30 GMT	Assombalonga 42'; Brereton 90'	Report	19' Kodjia; (yellow card) 31' (yellow-red card) 78' Grealish	Stadium: City Ground; Attendance: 19,866 (1,946 away); Referee: Paul Tierney

11 February 2017 31	Norwich City	5–1	Nottingham Forest	Norwich
15:00 GMT	Howson 10'; Murphy 16'; Hoolahan 18'; Pritchard 61' 89'	Report	(yellow card) 45' (yellow-red card) 70' Lichaj; 75' McCormack	Stadium: Carrow Road; Attendance: 26,861 (1,514 away); Referee: Scott Duncan

14 February 2017 32	Fulham	3–2	Nottingham Forest	Hammersmith and Fulham
19:45 GMT	Cairney 30'; Piazon 33'; Hobbs 72' (o.g.)	Report	2' Kasami; 47' Brereton	Stadium: Craven Cottage; Attendance: 15,365 (1,248 away); Referee: James Linington

18 February 2017 33	Nottingham Forest	1–2	Sheffield Wednesday	West Bridgford
15:00 GMT	Osborn 60'	Report	28' Abdi; 53' Forestieri	Stadium: City Ground; Attendance: 20,164 (1,922 away); Referee: Andrew Madley

25 February 2017 34	Wigan Athletic	0–0	Nottingham Forest	Wigan
15:00 GMT		Report		Stadium: DW Stadium; Attendance: 11,254 (1,438 away); Referee: Geoff Eltringham

4 March 2017 35	Nottingham Forest	3–0	Brighton & Hove Albion	West Bridgford
15:00 GMT	Clough 60' 90' (pen.); Osborn 89'	Report		Stadium: City Ground; Attendance: 22,020 (1,919 away); Referee: Oliver Langford

7 March 2017 36	Nottingham Forest	2–3	Brentford	West Bridgford
19:45 GMT	Brereton 82'; Clough 90'	Report	17' 55' Vibe; 68' Jota	Stadium: City Ground; Attendance: 16,903 (432 away); Referee: Tim Robinson

11 March 2017 37	Burton Albion	1–0	Nottingham Forest	Burton upon Trent
15:00 GMT	Woodrow 26'	Report		Stadium: Pirelli Stadium; Attendance: 6,115 (1,698 away); Referee: Keith Stroud

18 March 2017 38	Nottingham Forest	2–2	Derby County	West Bridgford
13:00 GMT	Clough 5'; Pinillos 90'	Report	48' Vydra; 53' Nugent	Stadium: City Ground; Attendance: 26,665 (1,951 away); Referee: Peter Bankes

1 April 2017 39	Preston North End	1–1	Nottingham Forest	Preston
15:00 BST	McGeady 53'	Report	22' Assombalonga	Stadium: Deepdale; Attendance: 12,459 (1,539 away); Referee: Darren Bond

4 April 2017 40	Wolverhampton Wanderers	1–0	Nottingham Forest	Wolverhampton
19:45 BST	Dicko 62'	Report	(yellow card) 56' (yellow-red card) 90' Fox	Stadium: Molineux Stadium; Attendance: 21,408 (1,260 away); Referee: James Linington

8 April 2017 41	Nottingham Forest	2–0	Huddersfield Town	West Bridgford
15:00 BST	Lichaj 32'; Ward 57'	Report		Stadium: City Ground; Attendance: 20,411 (1,950 away); Referee: Tim Robinson

14 April 2017 42	Nottingham Forest	0–1	Blackburn Rovers	West Bridgford
15:00 BST		Report	78' Hoban	Stadium: City Ground; Attendance: 26,279 (1,638 away); Referee: Roger East

17 April 2017 43	Cardiff City	1–0	Nottingham Forest	Cardiff
15:00 BST	Gunnarsson 70'	Report		Stadium: Cardiff City Stadium; Attendance: 16,413 (643 away); Referee: Andrew Madley

22 April 2017 44	Nottingham Forest	3–2	Reading	West Bridgford
15:00 BST	Assombalonga 31' 47'; Carayol 54'	Report	58' 74' Kermorgant	Stadium: City Ground; Attendance: 20,323 (1,014 away); Referee: Geoff Eltringham

29 April 2017 45	Queens Park Rangers	2–0	Nottingham Forest	Hammersmith and Fulham
15:00 BST	Washington 49'; Lynch 60'	Report		Stadium: Loftus Road; Attendance: 16,474 (1,791 away); Referee: James Linington

7 May 2017 46	Nottingham Forest	3–0	Ipswich Town	West Bridgford
12:00 BST	Assombalonga 43' (pen.) 69'; Cohen 57'	Report		Stadium: City Ground; Attendance: 28,249 (1,477 away); Referee: Andy Davies

=== FA Cup ===
Forest entered the 2016–17 FA Cup at the third round, and were drawn to play Wigan Athletic at the DW Stadium on 7 January 2017.

7 January 2017 Third round	Wigan Athletic	2–0	Nottingham Forest	Wigan
15:00 BST	Grigg 45'; Wildschut 57'	Report		Stadium: DW Stadium; Attendance: 5,163; Referee: Oliver Langford

=== EFL Cup ===
On Wednesday 22 June 2016, The Football League released the opening fixtures list for the 2016–17 EFL Cup. Forest opened their campaign away at League Two side Doncaster Rovers.

9 August 2016 First round	Doncaster Rovers	1–2	Nottingham Forest	Doncaster
19:45 BST	Mandeville 70'	Report	10' Vaughan; 90' Ward	Stadium: Keepmoat Stadium; Attendance: 5,160; Referee: Andy Haines

23 August 2016 Second round	Millwall	1–2	Nottingham Forest	Southwark
19:45 BST	Williams 77'	Report	35' Paterson; 87' Veldwijk	Stadium: The Den; Attendance: 4,009; Referee: Gavin Ward

20 September 2016 Third round	Nottingham Forest	0–4	Arsenal	West Bridgford
19:45 BST			23' Xhaka; 60' 71' Pérez; 90' Oxlade-Chamberlain	Stadium: City Ground; Attendance: 28,567; Referee: Paul Tierney

== Season statistics ==
=== Appearances and goals ===
As of match played 7 May 2017 (Note: Players whose names are in italics spent time on loan at other clubs during the course of the season.) (Note: Players whose names appear emboldened left the club on a permanent basis having appeared in a competitive fixture this season.)

No.	Pos	Nat	Player	Total		EFL Championship		Emirates FA Cup		EFL Cup	
No.	Pos	Nat	Player	Apps	Goals	Apps	Goals	Apps	Goals	Apps	Goals
1	GK	(Netherlands) NED	Dorus de Vries	1	0	1	0	0	0	0	0
2	DF	(United States) USA	Eric Lichaj	45	2	39+2	2	1	0	3	0
3	DF	(Spain) ESP	Daniel Pinillos	16	1	14+2	1	0	0	0	0
4	DF	(England) ENG	Michael Mancienne	30	0	24+4	0	1	0	1	0
5	DF	(England) ENG	Matt Mills	30	1	24+3	1	0	0	3	0
6	DF	(Senegal) SEN	Armand Traoré	13	0	9+3	0	0	0	1	0
7	ST	(England) ENG	Matty Fryatt (Note: An injury to Fryatt's Achilles tendon, sustained in March 2015, prevented him from playing this season.)	0	0	0	0	0	0	0	0
8	MF	(England) ENG	Chris Cohen	22	1	20	1	0	0	2	0
9	ST	(Democratic Republic of the Congo) COD	Britt Assombalonga	33	14	20+12	14	1	0	0	0
10	MF	(England) ENG	Henri Lansbury	19	6	16+1	6	0	0	2	0
10	MF	(Portugal) POR	João Teixeira	0	0	0	0	0	0	0	0
11	MF	(England) ENG	Ben Osborn	49	4	45+1	4	1	0	1+1	0
12	ST	(Italy) ITA	Nicolao Dumitru	12	1	6+4	1	1	0	1	0
13	DF	(Scotland) SCO	Danny Fox	23	0	22+1	0	0	0	0	0
14	ST	(Denmark) DEN	Nicklas Bendtner	17	2	7+8	2	1	0	1	0
14	ST	(South Africa) RSA	Lars Veldwijk	3	1	1	0	0	0	1+1	1
15	MF	(England) ENG	Aaron Tshibola	4	0	2+2	0	0	0	0	0
16	ST	(England) ENG	Zach Clough	14	4	9+5	4	0	0	0	0
17	DF	(Portugal) POR	Hildeberto Pereira	25	2	16+6	2	1	0	1+1	0
18	MF	(The Gambia) GAM	Mustapha Carayol	21	1	13+6	1	0+1	0	0+1	0
19	MF	(Northern Ireland) NIR	Jamie Ward	20	2	13+5	1	0	0	2	1
20	MF	(Portugal) POR	Licá	7	0	2+3	0	0+1	0	0+1	0
21	MF	(United States) USA	Gboly Ariyibi	0	0	0	0	0	0	0	0
21	ST	(England) ENG	Jamie Paterson	3	1	0+1	0	0	0	2	1
22	MF	(Switzerland) SUI	Pajtim Kasami	27	2	19+6	2	0	0	1+1	0
24	MF	(Wales) WAL	David Vaughan	33	1	25+6	0	0	0	2	1
25	DF	(England) ENG	Jack Hobbs	9	0	8	0	1	0	0	0
26	GK	(Bulgaria) BUL	Dimitar Evtimov	0	0	0	0	0	0	0	0
27	DF	(Poland) POL	Damien Perquis	19	2	17	2	0	0	2	0
28	DF	(Finland) FIN	Thomas Lam	21	2	11+8	2	1	0	1	0
30	GK	(Ireland) EIR	Stephen Henderson	15	0	11+1	0	1	0	2	0
34	ST	(England) ENG	Tyler Walker	0	0	0	0	0	0	0	0
35	MF	(Scotland) SCO	Oliver Burke	7	4	4+1	4	0	0	1+1	0
37	MF	(England) ENG	Jorge Grant	6	0	4+2	0	0	0	0	0
38	GK	(Serbia) SRB	Vladimir Stojković	21	0	20	0	0	0	1	0
39	ST	(Greece) GRE	Apostolos Vellios	31	6	12+16	6	0+1	0	1+1	0
40	DF	(Scotland) SCO	Alex Iacovitti	2	0	2	0	0	0	0	0
41	MF	(England) ENG	Matty Cash	30	0	18+10	0	1	0	0+1	0
42	DF	(England) ENG	Joe Worrall	21	0	21	0	0	0	0	0
43	GK	(England) ENG	Jordan Smith	15	0	14+1	0	0	0	0	0
44	MF	(England) ENG	Ryan Yates	0	0	0	0	0	0	0	0
45	ST	(England) ENG	Ben Brereton	18	3	13+5	3	0	0	0	0
46	DF	(Scotland) SCO	Jordan Gabriel	0	0	0	0	0	0	0	0
47	ST	(England) ENG	James Thorne	1	0	0	0	0	0	1	0
48	DF	(Sweden) SWE	Anel Ahmedhodžić	1	0	0+1	0	0	0	0	0
49	MF	(England) ENG	Toby Edser	0	0	0	0	0	0	0	0
50	ST	(Scotland) SCO	Ross McCormack	7	1	3+4	1	0	0	0	0

=== Goal scorers ===
As of match played 7 May 2017

Rank	No.	Position	Player	EFL Championship	Emirates FA Cup	EFL Cup	Total
1	9	Striker	Britt Assombalonga	14	0	0	14
2	10	Midfielder	Henri Lansbury	6	0	0	6
2	39	Striker	Apostolos Vellios	6	0	0	6
3	11	Midfielder	Ben Osborn	4	0	0	4
3	16	Striker	Zach Clough	4	0	0	4
3	35	Midfielder	Oliver Burke	4	0	0	4
4	45	Striker	Ben Brereton	3	0	0	3
5	2	Defender	Eric Lichaj	2	0	0	2
5	14	Striker	Nicklas Bendtner	2	0	0	2
5	17	Defender	Hildeberto Pereira	2	0	0	2
5	19	Midfielder	Jamie Ward	1	0	1	2
5	22	Midfielder	Pajtim Kasami	2	0	0	2
5	27	Defender	Damien Perquis	2	0	0	2
5	28	Defender	Thomas Lam	2	0	0	2
5	Own goals			2	0	0	2
6	3	Defender	Daniel Pinillos	1	0	0	1
6	5	Defender	Matt Mills	1	0	0	1
6	8	Midfielder	Chris Cohen	1	0	0	1
6	12	Striker	Nicolao Dumitru	1	0	0	1
6	14	Striker	Lars Veldwijk	0	0	1	1
6	18	Midfielder	Mustapha Carayol	1	0	0	1
6	21	Striker	Jamie Paterson	0	0	1	1
6	24	Midfielder	David Vaughan	0	0	1	1
6	50	Striker	Ross McCormack	1	0	0	1
TOTAL				62	0	4	66

=== Disciplinary record ===
As of match played 7 May 2017

No.	Position	Player	EFL Championship		Emirates FA Cup		EFL Cup		Total	
No.	Position	Player	Booked	Sent off (straight red)	Booked	Sent off (straight red)	Booked	Sent off (straight red)	Booked	Sent off (straight red)
17	Defender	Hildeberto Pereira	7	3	1	0	1	0	9	3
2	Defender	Eric Lichaj	9	1	0	0	0	0	9	1
13	Defender	Danny Fox	9	1	0	0	0	0	9	1
10	Midfielder	Henri Lansbury	8	0	0	0	1	0	9	0
5	Defender	Matt Mills	8	1	0	0	0	0	8	1
11	Midfielder	Ben Osborn	7	0	0	0	0	0	7	0
28	Defender	Thomas Lam	6	1	0	0	0	0	6	1
19	Midfielder	Jamie Ward	5	0	0	0	1	0	6	0
8	Midfielder	Chris Cohen	3	0	0	0	1	0	4	0
24	Midfielder	David Vaughan	4	0	0	0	0	0	4	0
39	Striker	Apostolos Vellios	3	0	0	0	1	0	4	0
41	Midfielder	Matty Cash	4	0	0	0	0	0	4	0
4	Defender	Michael Mancienne	3	1	0	0	0	0	3	1
27	Defender	Damien Perquis	3	1	0	0	0	0	3	1
22	Midfielder	Pajtim Kasami	3	0	0	0	0	0	3	0
25	Defender	Jack Hobbs	2	0	1	0	0	0	3	0
6	Defender	Armand Traoré	2	0	0	0	0	0	2	0
2	Defender	Daniel Pinillos	1	0	0	0	0	0	1	0
12	Striker	Nicolao Dumitru	1	0	0	0	0	0	1	0
14	Striker	Nicklas Bendtner	0	0	0	0	1	0	1	0
15	Midfielder	Aaron Tshibola	1	0	0	0	0	0	1	0
30	Goalkeeper	Stephen Henderson	1	0	0	0	0	0	1	0
35	Midfielder	Oliver Burke	1	0	0	0	0	0	1	0
38	Goalkeeper	Vladimir Stojković	1	0	0	0	0	0	1	0
40	Defender	Alex Iacovitti	1	0	0	0	0	0	1	0
42	Defender	Joe Worrall	1	0	0	0	0	0	1	0
45	Striker	Ben Brereton	1	0	0	0	0	0	1	0
47	Striker	James Thorne	0	0	0	0	1	0	1	0
TOTAL			95	9	2	0	7	0	104	9
