= 2014–15 Nottingham Forest F.C. season =

English football club season

Nottingham Forest
2014–15 season
- Owner: Fawaz Al-Hasawi
- Chairman: Fawaz Al-Hasawi
- Manager: Stuart Pearce (until 1 February); Dougie Freedman (from 1 February)
- Ground: City Ground
- Championship: 14th
- FA Cup: Third round
- League Cup: Third round
- Top goalscorer: League: Britt Assombalonga (15); All: Michail Antonio; Britt Assombalonga (15 each)
- Highest home attendance: 30,227 (vs. Derby County, Football League Championship, 14 September)
- Lowest home attendance: 19,619 (vs. Wigan Athletic, Football League Championship, 11 February)
| Home colours | Away colours |

The 2014–15 season was Nottingham Forest Football Club's 149th season in existence and 7th consecutive season in the Championship since promotion in 2007–08. The club also participated in the FA Cup and Football League Cup. The season covers the period 1 July 2014 to 30 June 2015.

Stuart Pearce, who made over 500 appearances for the club as a player, began the season as manager before he was replaced by another former Forest player, Dougie Freedman, on 1 February 2015.

== First team squad ==
As of 5 May 2015

| No. | Player | Nationality | Date of birth (age) | Previous club | Joined first team | Player contracted until |
Goalkeepers
| 1 | Karl Darlow | ENG | 8 October 1990 (aged 24) | Newcastle United | 2014 | 2015 |
| 26 | Dimitar Evtimov | BUL | 7 September 1993 (aged 21) | Chavdar Etropole | 2011 | 2016 |
| 29 | Dorus de Vries | NED | 29 December 1980 (aged 34) | Wolverhampton Wanderers | 2013 | 2017 |
Defenders
| 2 | Eric Lichaj | USA | 17 November 1988 (aged 26) | Aston Villa | 2013 | 2017 |
| 4 | Michael Mancienne | ENG | 8 January 1988 (aged 27) | Hamburger SV | 2014 | 2017 |
| 5 | Danny Collins | WAL | 6 August 1980 (aged 34) | Stoke City | 2012 | 2015 |
| 6 | Kelvin Wilson | ENG | 3 September 1985 (aged 29) | Celtic | 2013 | 2016 |
| 13 | Danny Fox | SCO | 29 May 1986 (aged 29) | Southampton | 2014 | 2017 |
| 15 | Greg Halford | ENG | 8 December 1984 (aged 30) | Portsmouth | 2012 | 2015 |
| 16 | Jamaal Lascelles | ENG | 11 November 1993 (aged 21) | Newcastle United | 2014 | 2015 |
| 17 | Todd Kane | ENG | 17 September 1993 (aged 21) | Chelsea | 2015 | 2015 |
| 20 | Louis Laing | ENG | 6 May 1993 (aged 22) | Sunderland | 2014 | 2016 |
| 25 | Jack Hobbs | ENG | 18 August 1988 (aged 26) | Hull City | 2014 | 2018 |
| 33 | Roger Riera | ESP | 17 February 1995 (aged 20) | Barcelona | 2014 | 2018 |
Midfielders
| 8 | Chris Cohen | ENG | 5 March 1987 (aged 28) | Yeovil Town | 2007 | 2016 |
| 10 | Henri Lansbury | ENG | 12 October 1990 (aged 24) | Arsenal | 2012 | 2017 |
| 11 | Andy Reid | IRL | 29 July 1982 (aged 32) | Blackpool | 2011 | 2016 |
| 18 | Michail Antonio | ENG | 28 March 1990 (aged 25) | Sheffield Wednesday | 2014 | 2017 |
| 21 | Jamie Paterson | ENG | 20 December 1991 (aged 23) | Walsall | 2013 | 2018 |
| 22 | Gary Gardner | ENG | 29 June 1992 (aged 23) | Aston Villa | 2015 | 2015 |
| 24 | David Vaughan | WAL | 18 February 1983 (aged 32) | Sunderland | 2014 | 2016 |
| 27 | Chris Burke | SCO | 2 December 1983 (aged 31) | Birmingham City | 2014 | 2016 |
| 30 | Stephen McLaughlin | IRL | 14 June 1990 (aged 25) | Derry City | 2012 | 2015 |
| 37 | Jorge Grant | ENG | 26 September 1994 (aged 20) | Academy | 2014 | 2017 |
| 38 | Ben Osborn | ENG | 5 August 1994 (aged 20) | Academy | 2012 | 2019 |
Forwards
| 7 | Matty Fryatt | ENG | 5 March 1986 (aged 29) | Hull City | 2014 | 2017 |
| 9 | Britt Assombalonga | DRC | 6 December 1992 (aged 22) | Peterborough United | 2014 | 2019 |
| 14 | Lars Veldwijk | NED | 21 August 1991 (aged 23) | Excelsior | 2014 | 2017 |
| 23 | Dexter Blackstock | ATG | 20 May 1986 (aged 29) | Queens Park Rangers | 2009 | 2017 |
| 31 | Chuba Akpom | ENG | 9 October 1995 (aged 19) | Arsenal | 2015 | 2015 |
| 34 | Tyler Walker | ENG | 17 December 1996 (aged 18) | Academy | 2015 | — |

=== New contracts ===
| Date | Position | Nationality | Player | Length of contract | Player contracted until | Reference |
|---|---|---|---|---|---|---|
| 25 July 2014 | GK | BUL | Dimitar Evtimov | 2 Years | 2016 | |
| 22 August 2014 | MF | ENG | Henri Lansbury | 3 Years | 2017 | |
| 30 December 2014 | DF | USA | Eric Lichaj | 2.5 Years | 2017 | |
| 9 February 2015 | GK | NED | Dorus de Vries | 2 Years | 2017 | |
| 10 February 2015 | DF | DEN | Frederik Nielsen | Undisclosed | Undisclosed | |
| 10 February 2015 | MF | ENG | Matty Cash | Undisclosed | Undisclosed | |
| 10 February 2015 | ST | BUL | Nikolay Todorov | Undisclosed | Undisclosed | |
| 10 February 2015 | ST | ENG | Tyler Walker | Undisclosed | Undisclosed | |
| 23 February 2015 | MF | ENG | Jorge Grant | 2.5 Years | 2017 | |

== Player transfers ==
=== Transfers in ===
First team
| Date | Position | Nationality | Name | From | Transfer Fee | Reference |
|---|---|---|---|---|---|---|
| 1 July 2014 | ST | ENG | Matty Fryatt | Free Agent | Free Transfer | |
| 1 July 2014 | DF | ENG | Louis Laing | Free Agent | Free Transfer | |
| 1 July 2014 | MF | WAL | David Vaughan | Free Agent | Free Transfer | |
| 16 July 2014 | DF | ENG | Michael Mancienne | Hamburg | Undisclosed | |
| 29 July 2014 | MF | SCO | Chris Burke | Free Agent | Free Transfer | |
| 6 August 2014 | MF | ENG | Michail Antonio | Sheffield Wednesday | Undisclosed | |
| 6 August 2014 | ST | DRC | Britt Assombalonga | Peterborough United | Undisclosed (Note: Reported by the BBC to have been a club record fee of £5.5 million.) | |
| 14 August 2014 | MF | GER | Robert Tesche | Free Agent | Free Transfer | |

Academy
| Date | Position | Nationality | Name | From | Fee | Reference |
|---|---|---|---|---|---|---|
| 15 July 2014 | DF | ESP | Roger Riera | Free Agent | Free Transfer | |
| 10 September 2014 | DF | DEN | Frederik Nielsen | Viborg | Undisclosed | |
| 8 October 2014 | MF | ENG | Matty Cash | FAB Academy | Scholarship | |
| 10 February 2015 | DF | SCO | Jordan Gabriel | Southend United | Scholarship | |
| 2 June 2015 | GK | SWE | Tim Erlandsson | Halmstad | Undisclosed | |

=== Loans in ===
| Date from | Position | Nationality | Name | From | Date Until | Reference |
|---|---|---|---|---|---|---|
| 22 July 2014 | DF | ENG | Jack Hunt | Crystal Palace | 31 December 2014 | |
| 9 August 2014 | GK | ENG | Karl Darlow | Newcastle United | 30 June 2015 | |
| 9 August 2014 | DF | ENG | Jamaal Lascelles | Newcastle United | 30 June 2015 | |
| 30 October 2014 | MF | ENG | Tom Ince | Hull City | 22 December 2014 | |
| 8 January 2015 | DF | ENG | Todd Kane | Chelsea | 30 June 2015 | |
| 10 January 2015 | MF | ENG | Gary Gardner | Aston Villa | 30 June 2015 | |
| 12 March 2015 | MF | GAM | Modou Barrow | Swansea City | 25 April 2015 | |
| 26 March 2015 | ST | ENG | Chuba Akpom | Arsenal | 31 May 2015 | |

=== Transfers out ===
First team
| Date | Position | Nationality | Name | To | Fee | Reference |
|---|---|---|---|---|---|---|
| 15 July 2014 | ST | ALG | Rafik Djebbour | Free Agent (Later joined APOEL) | Contract Terminated | |
| 1 August 2014 | ST | ENG | Darius Henderson | Free Agent (Later joined Leyton Orient) | Contract Terminated | |
| 7 August 2014 | ST | IRL | Simon Cox | Reading | Undisclosed | |
| 9 August 2014 | GK | ENG | Karl Darlow | Newcastle United | Undisclosed (Note: The combined fee for Darlow and Lascelles was reported by sources such as the Nottingham Post and the Mirror to be £7,000,000. As part of the agreement, both players remained at Forest on loan for the 2014–15 season.) | |
| 9 August 2014 | DF | ENG | Jamaal Lascelles | Newcastle United | Undisclosed | |

Academy
| Date | Position | Nationality | Name | To | Transfer Fee | Reference |
|---|---|---|---|---|---|---|
| 1 July 2014 | MF | NIR | David Morgan | Free Agent (Later joined Ilkeston) | Released | |
| 29 August 2014 | ST | CYP | James Demetriou | Swansea City | Free Transfer | |

=== Loans out ===
| Date From | Position | Nationality | Name | To | Date Until | Reference |
|---|---|---|---|---|---|---|
| 29 July 2014 | MF | POL | Radosław Majewski | Huddersfield Town | 30 June 2015 | |
| 8 August 2014 | ST | SCO | Jamie Mackie | Reading | 30 June 2015 | |
| 19 August 2014 | GK | BUL | Dimitar Evtimov | Mansfield Town | 5 January 2015 | |
| 12 September 2014 | DF | ENG | Louis Laing | Notts County | 13 December 2014 | |
| 29 September 2014 | MF | IRE | Stephen McLaughlin | Notts County | 30 December 2014 | |
| 4 November 2014 | DF | ENG | Greg Halford | Brighton & Hove Albion | 30 June 2015 | |
| 5 January 2015 | DF | ENG | Dan Harding | Millwall | 30 June 2015 | |
| 30 January 2015 | DF | ENG | Louis Laing | Motherwell | 30 June 2015 | |
| 2 February 2015 | MF | CIV | Wilfried Gnahoré | Ilkeston | 30 June 2015 | |
| 2 February 2015 | MF | CMR | Edouard Schoenecker | Ilkeston | 30 June 2015 | |
| 3 February 2015 | MF | ALG | Djamel Abdoun | Lokeren | 30 June 2015 | |
| 24 February 2015 | MF | SCO | Oliver Burke | Bradford City | 22 March 2015 | |
| 2 March 2015 | MF | GER | Robert Tesche | Birmingham City | 30 June 2015 | |
| 26 March 2015 | MF | IRE | Stephen McLaughlin | Southend United | 30 June 2015 | |

== Pre-season friendlies ==
| 12 July 2014 | Ilkeston | 0–4 | Nottingham Forest | Ilkeston |
| 13:00 BST | | Report | 77', 83' Cox; 81', 90' Osborn | Stadium: New Manor Ground; Attendance: 3,020 |

| 16 July 2014 | Porto B | 2–3 | Nottingham Forest | Vila Nova de Gaia |
| 18:00 BST | Kléber 4'; David Bruno 59' | Report | 44' Lansbury; 82' Veldwijk; 88' McLaughlin | Stadium: CTFD PortoGaia |

| 19 July 2014 | Rio Ave | 1–0 | Nottingham Forest | Esposende |
| 18:00 BST | Diego Lopes 71' | Report | | Stadium: Complexo Desportivo |

| 23 July 2014 | Rotherham United | 1–0 | Nottingham Forest | Rotherham |
| 19:30 BST | Agard 65' | Report | | Stadium: New York Stadium; Attendance: 3,600 |

| 27 July 2014 | Milton Keynes Dons | 1–0 | Nottingham Forest | Milton Keynes |
| 15:00 BST | Reeves 11' | Report | | Stadium: Stadium mk Attendance: 4,121 |

| 30 July 2014 | York City | 1–2 | Nottingham Forest | York |
| 19:30 BST | Platt 51' | Report | 52' Mackie; 57' Cox | Stadium: Bootham Crescent; Attendance: 1,714; Referee: Ross Joyce |

| 2 August 2014 | Nottingham Forest | 1–0 | West Bromwich Albion | West Bridgford |
| 13:30 BST | Fryatt 25' | Report | | Stadium: City Ground; Attendance: 6,423; Referee: Andre Marriner |

== Competitions ==
=== Championship ===
==== League table ====
| Pos | Team | Pld | W | D | L | GF | GA | GD | Pts |
|---|---|---|---|---|---|---|---|---|---|
| 12 | Charlton Athletic | 46 | 14 | 18 | 14 | 54 | 60 | −6 | 60 |
| 13 | Sheffield Wednesday | 46 | 14 | 18 | 14 | 43 | 49 | −6 | 60 |
| 14 | Nottingham Forest | 46 | 15 | 14 | 17 | 71 | 69 | +2 | 59 |
| 15 | Leeds United | 46 | 15 | 11 | 20 | 50 | 61 | −11 | 56 |
| 16 | Huddersfield Town | 46 | 13 | 16 | 17 | 58 | 75 | −17 | 55 |

Updated to match(es) played on 2 May 2015. Source: Sky Sports
Rules for classification: 1) Points; 2) Goal difference; 3) Number of goals scored

==== Results summary ====
| Overall | | | | | | | | Home | | | | | | Away | | | | | |
| Pld | W | D | L | GF | GA | GD | Pts | W | D | L | GF | GA | GD | W | D | L | GF | GA | GD |
|---|---|---|---|---|---|---|---|---|---|---|---|---|---|---|---|---|---|---|---|
| 46 | 15 | 14 | 17 | 71 | 69 | +2 | 59 | 9 | 5 | 9 | 37 | 32 | +5 | 6 | 9 | 8 | 34 | 37 | −3 |

Last updated: 3 May 2015.
Source: Nottingham Forest F.C.

==== Results by matchday ====
| Round | 1 | 2 | 3 | 4 | 5 | 6 | 7 | 8 | 9 | 10 | 11 | 12 | 13 | 14 | 15 | 16 | 17 | 18 | 19 | 20 | 21 | 22 | 23 | 24 | 25 | 26 | 27 | 28 | 29 | 30 | 31 | 32 | 33 | 34 | 35 | 36 | 37 | 38 | 39 | 40 | 41 | 42 | 43 | 44 | 45 | 46 |
|---|---|---|---|---|---|---|---|---|---|---|---|---|---|---|---|---|---|---|---|---|---|---|---|---|---|---|---|---|---|---|---|---|---|---|---|---|---|---|---|---|---|---|---|---|---|---|
| Ground | H | A | A | H | A | H | H | A | H | A | H | A | A | H | A | H | H | A | A | H | A | H | A | H | H | A | A | H | A | H | A | H | H | A | A | H | A | H | A | H | A | H | H | A | A | H |
| Result | W | D | W | W | W | D | W | D | D | D | D | L | D | L | L | L | W | W | L | D | D | D | L | L | L | W | L | L | W | W | D | W | W | W | L | W | D | W | L | L | D | L | L | D | L | L |
| Position | 3 | 3 | 1 | 1 | 1 | 1 | 1 | 1 | 2 | 2 | 2 | 5 | 6 | 7 | 10 | 11 | 11 | 8 | 9 | 10 | 9 | 9 | 10 | 10 | 13 | 12 | 12 | 12 | 12 | 10 | 10 | 9 | 9 | 9 | 9 | 9 | 9 | 9 | 9 | 9 | 9 | 9 | 10 | 11 | 12 | 14 |

Source: Statto.com
A = Away; H = Home; W = Win; D = Draw; L = Loss

==== Matches ====
| 9 August 2014 1 | Nottingham Forest | 2–0 | Blackpool | West Bridgford |
| 15:00 BST | Antonio 25'; Burke 30'; Hunt (yellow card) 64' | Report | (yellow card) 76' Mellis; (yellow card) 81' Orlandi | Stadium: The City Ground; Attendance: 28,028; Referee: Tony Harrington |

| 16 August 2014 2 | Bolton Wanderers | 2–2 | Nottingham Forest | Horwich |
| 15:00 BST | Mason 4'; Wheater 29'; Spearing (yellow card) 37'; Pratley (yellow card) 85'; Mills (yellow card) 90' | Report | 27' 35' (pen.) Assombalonga | Stadium: Macron Stadium; Attendance: 15,753; Referee: Eddie Ilderton |

| 19 August 2014 3 | Bournemouth | 1–2 | Nottingham Forest | Bournemouth |
| 19:45 BST | Wilson 58'; Ritchie (yellow card) 66'; Cook (yellow card) 90' | Report | (yellow card) 37' Fox; 67' Assombalonga; 72' (yellow card) 89' Fryatt; (yellow card) 90' Hunt | Stadium: Goldsands Stadium; Attendance: 10,768; Referee: Kevin Friend |

| 23 August 2014 4 | Nottingham Forest | 4–0 | Reading | West Bridgford |
| 15:00 BST | Antonio 17' 47'; Fryatt 53'; Assombalonga 64'; Cohen (yellow card) 69' | Report | (yellow card) 80' Blackman | Stadium: The City Ground; Attendance: 22,795; Referee: Andy Woolmer |

| 30 August 2014 5 | Sheffield Wednesday | 0–1 | Nottingham Forest | Sheffield |
| 12:15 BST | Semedo (yellow card) 21'; Loovens (yellow card) 31'; Mattock (yellow card) 34'; Palmer (yellow card) 53'; Maghoma (yellow card) 90' | Report | (yellow card) 29' Antonio; 37' Lansbury; (yellow card) 90' Burke; (yellow card) 90' Assombalonga | Stadium: Hillsborough; Attendance: 20,656; Referee: Graham Salisbury |

| 14 September 2014 6 | Nottingham Forest | 1–1 | Derby County | West Bridgford |
| 13:15 BST | Reid (yellow card) 38'; Osborn (yellow card) 47'; Lansbury (yellow card) 59'; Assombalonga 72'; Burke (yellow card) 80' | Report | (yellow card) 7' Eustace; (yellow card) 57' (yellow-red card) 87' Buxton; 80' Shotton | Stadium: The City Ground; Attendance: 30,227; Referee: Paul Tierney |

| 17 September 2014 7 | Nottingham Forest | 5–3 | Fulham | West Bridgford |
| 19:45 BST | Assombalonga 9' 21' (pen.) 79'; Antonio 77'; Paterson 89' (yellow card) 90'; Lascelles (yellow card) 90' | Report | (yellow card) 20' Hutchinson; (yellow card) 20' Burn; 31' 65' McCormack; (yellow card) 50' Fotheringham; 51' Rodallega; (yellow card) 58' Amorebieta; (yellow card) 69' Bodurov; (yellow card) 73' Parker | Stadium: The City Ground; Attendance: 22,572; Referee: Darren Deadman |

| 20 September 2014 8 | Millwall | 0–0 | Nottingham Forest | Southwark |
| 15:00 BST | Beevers (yellow card) 54'; Williams (yellow card) 86' | Report | (yellow card) 51' Lansbury; (yellow card) 55' Mancienne; (yellow card) 79' Darlow | Stadium: The Den; Attendance: 12,038; Referee: Graham Scott |

| 27 September 2014 9 | Nottingham Forest | 0–0 | Brighton & Hove Albion | West Bridgford |
| 15:00 BST | Fox (yellow card) 40'; Tesche (yellow card) 55' | Report | (yellow card) 52' Bennett; (yellow card) 79' Colunga; (yellow card) 85' Ince | Stadium: The City Ground; Attendance: 23,811; Referee: Bobby Madley |

| 30 September 2014 10 | Wigan Athletic | 0–0 | Nottingham Forest | Wigan |
| 19:45 BST | Huws (yellow card) 89' | Report | (yellow card) 26' Lansbury; (yellow card) 52' Mancienne; (yellow card) 85' Hunt | Stadium: DW Stadium; Attendance: 14,078; Referee: Kevin Wright |

| 5 October 2014 11 | Nottingham Forest | 2–2 | Ipswich Town | West Bridgford |
| 15:00 BST | Lansbury (yellow card) 57'; Tesche 63'; Antonio 90' | Report | 19' 71' Murphy | Stadium: The City Ground; Attendance: 24,354; Referee: James Linington |

| 18 October 2014 12 | Cardiff City | 2–1 | Nottingham Forest | Cardiff |
| 12:15 BST | Macheda 22'; Whittingham 27'; Noone (yellow card) 45' | Report | (yellow card) 41' Wilson; (yellow card) 54' Lansbury; (yellow card) 88' (goal) 89' Assombalonga | Stadium: Cardiff City Stadium; Attendance: 21,263; Referee: Mike Jones |

| 21 October 2014 13 | Watford | 2–2 | Nottingham Forest | Watford |
| 19:45 BST | Ighalo 29'; Vydra 52' (pen.) | Report | 31' 67' Antonio; (yellow card) 42' Mancienne | Stadium: Vicarage Road; Attendance: 16,095; Referee: Dean Whitestone |

| 25 October 2014 14 | Nottingham Forest | 1–3 | Blackburn Rovers | West Bridgford |
| 15:00 BST | Fryatt 37' | Report | (yellow card) 35' Evans; 66' Baptiste; 75' Gestede; 77' Rhodes; (yellow card) 90' Williamson | Stadium: The City Ground; Attendance: 27,345; Referee: Oliver Langford |

| 1 November 2014 15 | Huddersfield Town | 3–0 | Nottingham Forest | Huddersfield |
| 15:00 GMT | Lynch 1'; Wells 20'; Coady (yellow card) 51'; Holt 54' | Report | (yellow card) 37' Lichaj; (yellow card) 68' Fox | Stadium: John Smith's Stadium; Attendance: 15,317; Referee: Andy Davies |

| 5 November 2014 16 | Nottingham Forest | 1–3 | Brentford | West Bridgford |
| 19:45 GMT | Lansbury (yellow card) 20'; Antonio 82' | Report | 17' Toral; 35' Gray; 48' (pen.) (yellow card) 70' Pritchard; (yellow card) 55' Douglas | Stadium: The City Ground; Attendance: 21,072; Referee: Mark Heywood |

| 8 November 2014 17 | Nottingham Forest | 2–1 | Norwich City | West Bridgford |
| 15:00 GMT | Assombalonga 85'; Tesche (yellow card) 88'; Antonio 90' (yellow card) 90' | Report | (yellow card) 2' Martin; 16' Howson; (yellow card) 63' Tettey; (yellow card) 82' Lafferty | Stadium: The City Ground; Attendance: 24,783; Referee: Andrew Madley |

| 22 November 2014 18 | Wolverhampton Wanderers | 0–3 | Nottingham Forest | Wolverhampton |
| 15:00 GMT | Doherty (yellow card) 49'; Stearman (yellow card) 81' | Report | (yellow card) 21' (goal) 83' Lansbury; (yellow card) 45' Lascelles; 65' Assombalonga; 68' Fryatt; (yellow card) 69' Lichaj | Stadium: Molineux Stadium; Attendance: 25,513; Referee: Paul Tierney |

| 29 November 2014 19 | Birmingham City | 2–1 | Nottingham Forest | Birmingham |
| 15:00 GMT | Cotterill 10'; Gray (yellow card) 45'; Caddis 89' (pen.) | Report | (yellow card) 61' Ince; (yellow card) 80' Antonio; 84' (red card) 88' Assombalonga; (yellow card) 90' Lansbury; (yellow card) 90' Lascelles | Stadium: St Andrew's; Attendance: 18,595; Referee: Geoff Eltringham |

| 6 December 2014 20 | Nottingham Forest | 1–1 | Charlton Athletic | West Bridgford |
| 15:00 GMT | Lansbury (yellow card) 7'; Tesche 59' (yellow card) 72' | Report | 10' Harriott; (yellow card) 30' Coquelin | Stadium: The City Ground; Attendance: 22,297; Referee: Kevin Wright |

| 13 December 2014 21 | Rotherham United | 0–0 | Nottingham Forest | Rotherham |
| 15:00 GMT | Pringle (yellow card) 52'; Lawrence (yellow card) 82' | Report | (yellow card) 42' Fox | Stadium: New York Stadium; Attendance: 11,228; Referee: Richard Clark |

| 20 December 2014 22 | Nottingham Forest | 1–1 | Leeds United | West Bridgford |
| 17:15 GMT | Mancienne (yellow card) 23'; Fryatt 45'; Antonio (yellow card) 73'; Lichaj (yellow card) 82' | Report | (yellow card) 24' Byram; 54' (pen.) Sharp | Stadium: The City Ground; Attendance: 22,664; Referee: Roger East |

| 26 December 2014 23 | Middlesbrough | 3–0 | Nottingham Forest | Middlesbrough |
| 15:00 GMT | Friend 53'; Vossen 79'; Leadbitter 88' (pen.) | Report | (yellow card) 39' Mancienne; (yellow card) 54' (yellow-red card) 67' Wilson | Stadium: Riverside Stadium; Attendance: 32,277; Referee: Scott Duncan |

| 28 December 2014 24 | Nottingham Forest | 1–3 | Birmingham City | West Bridgford |
| 12:00 GMT | Lansbury (yellow card) 34'; Assombalonga 90' | Report | 35' Cotterill; 38' 45' (yellow card) 74' Donaldson | Stadium: The City Ground; Attendance: 26,212; Referee: Simon Hooper |

| 10 January 2015 25 | Nottingham Forest | 0–2 | Sheffield Wednesday | West Bridgford |
| 15:00 GMT | Vaughan (yellow card) 89' | Report | 45' Lee; 50' Maguire | Stadium: The City Ground; Attendance: 22,209; Referee: Andy D'Urso |

| 17 January 2015 26 | Derby County | 1–2 | Nottingham Forest | Derby |
| 12:15 GMT | Lansbury 16' (o.g.); Ward (yellow card) 21'; Mascarell (yellow card) 74' | Report | (yellow card) 30' Wilson; (yellow card) 36' Gardner; 75' Assombalonga; 90' Osborn | Stadium: iPro Stadium; Attendance: 32,705; Referee: Andrew Madley |

| 21 January 2015 27 | Fulham | 3–2 | Nottingham Forest | Hammersmith & Fulham |
| 19:45 GMT | McCormack 7' 18' 35'; Grimmer (yellow card) 84'; Kačaniklić (yellow card) 90' | Report | 45' 62' Lansbury | Stadium: Craven Cottage; Attendance: 15,512; Referee: Andy Haines |

| 31 January 2015 28 | Nottingham Forest | 0–1 | Millwall | West Bridgford |
| 15:00 GMT | Antonio (yellow card) 32'; Tesche (yellow card) 53' | Report | (yellow card) 34' Upson; (yellow card) 81' Williams; 83' Fuller | Stadium: The City Ground; Attendance: 23,018; Referee: Mark Heywood |

| 7 February 2015 29 | Brighton & Hove Albion | 2–3 | Nottingham Forest | Falmer |
| 15:00 GMT | Dunk 42'; Ince (yellow card) 62'; Kayal 90' | Report | 44' Collins; 63' Lansbury; 86' Osborn | Stadium: Falmer Stadium; Attendance: 26,267; Referee: Christopher Sarginson |

| 11 February 2015 30 | Nottingham Forest | 3–0 | Wigan Athletic | West Bridgford |
| 19:45 GMT | Assombalonga 33'; Burke 50'; Lansbury 61' | Report | | Stadium: The City Ground; Attendance: 19,619; Referee: Oliver Langford |

| 14 February 2015 31 | Blackpool | 4–4 | Nottingham Forest | Blackpool |
| 15:00 GMT | McMahon (yellow card) 23'; Aldred (yellow card) 40' (yellow-red card) 77'; Madine 45'; O'Dea (yellow card) 60'; Orlandi 66' (yellow card) 67'; Cameron (yellow card) 69'; Davies 73'; Ferguson 90' | Report | 68' Blackstock; 70' Gardner; 77' (pen.) Lansbury; 90' Burke | Stadium: Bloomfield Road; Attendance: 11,712; Referee: Lee Probert |

| 21 February 2015 32 | Nottingham Forest | 4–1 | Bolton Wanderers | West Bridgford |
| 15:00 GMT | Burke 8' 68'; Antonio 17'; Lansbury 65' (pen.) | Report | (yellow card) 44' (yellow-red card) 47' Mills; 45' (pen.) (yellow card) 73' Le Fondre; (yellow card) 90' Dervite | Stadium: The City Ground; Attendance: 22,441; Referee: Carl Boyeson |

| 25 February 2015 33 | Nottingham Forest | 2–1 | Bournemouth | West Bridgford |
| 19:45 GMT | Lascelles 21'; Lichaj (yellow card) 33'; Lansbury 44' | Report | 3' Surman | Stadium: The City Ground; Attendance: 20,637; Referee: Nigel Miller |

| 28 February 2015 34 | Reading | 0–3 | Nottingham Forest | Reading |
| 15:00 GMT | McCleary (yellow card) 60' | Report | 56' Osborn; 70' Fryatt; 80' Gardner | Stadium: Madejski Stadium; Attendance: 18,586; Referee: Mick Russell |

| 3 March 2015 35 | Charlton Athletic | 2–1 | Nottingham Forest | Greenwich |
| 19:45 GMT | Bulot 7' 38' | Report | (yellow card) 6' Lascelles; 14' (yellow card) 90' Antonio; (yellow card) 32' Lansbury; (yellow card) 90' Lichaj | Stadium: The Valley; Attendance: 14,937; Referee: Simon Hooper |

| 7 March 2015 36 | Nottingham Forest | 2–1 | Middlesbrough | West Bridgford |
| 15:00 GMT | Gardner 34'; Blackstock 65' | Report | 27', (yellow card) 44' Leadbitter; (yellow card) 90' Nsue | Stadium: The City Ground; Attendance: 24,200; Referee: Jonathan Moss |

| 14 March 2015 37 | Leeds United | 0–0 | Nottingham Forest | Leeds |
| 15:00 GMT | Bellusci (yellow card) 50'; Morison (yellow card) 66'; Mowatt (yellow card) 77'; Murphy (yellow card) 86' | Report | | Stadium: Elland Road; Attendance: 30,722; Referee: Keith Hill |

| 18 March 2015 38 | Nottingham Forest | 2–0 | Rotherham United | West Bridgford |
| 19:45 GMT | Gardner (yellow card) 37'; Blackstock 43'; Antonio 45' | Report | (yellow card) 30' Smallwood; (yellow card) 38' Árnason | Stadium: The City Ground; Attendance: 20,569; Referee: Michael Bull |

| 21 March 2015 39 | Norwich City | 3–1 | Nottingham Forest | Norwich |
| 15:00 GMT | Olsson (yellow card) 17'; Howson 45'; Jerome 56'; Hoolahan 59' (pen.) | Report | (yellow card) 66' Mancienne; 76' Burke | Stadium: Carrow Road; Attendance: 26,976; Referee: James Linington |

| 3 April 2015 40 | Nottingham Forest | 1–2 | Wolverhampton Wanderers | West Bridgford |
| 15:00 BST | Gardner (yellow card) 15'; Lascelles (yellow card) 75'; Blackstock 90' | Report | 46' Afobe; (yellow card) 66' Price; 72' (pen.) Sako | Stadium: The City Ground; Attendance: 27,185; Referee: Andy D'Urso |

| 6 April 2015 41 | Brentford | 2–2 | Nottingham Forest | Hounslow |
| 15:00 BST | Gray 80'; Jota 90' | Report | (yellow card) 37' Vaughan; 61' Walker; 77' Kane; (yellow card) 90' Lansbury | Stadium: Griffin Park; Attendance: 11,499; Referee: David Webb |

| 11 April 2015 42 | Nottingham Forest | 0–1 | Huddersfield Town | West Bridgford |
| 15:00 BST | | Report | 43' Scannell; (yellow card) 51' Gobern | Stadium: The City Ground; Attendance: 21,572; Referee: Darren Deadman |

| 15 April 2015 43 | Nottingham Forest | 1–3 | Watford | West Bridgford |
| 19:45 BST | Wilson (red card) 60'; Gardner 72' | Report | 4' Ighalo; 41' Connolly; (yellow card) 52' Deeney; (yellow card) 55' (goal) 87' Abdi; (yellow card) 65' Motta | Stadium: The City Ground; Attendance: 20,723; Referee: Paul Tierney |

| 18 April 2015 44 | Blackburn Rovers | 3–3 | Nottingham Forest | Blackburn |
| 15:00 BST | Gestede 3' 35' 82'; Williamson (yellow card) 90' | Report | 7' 88' Antonio; 45' Lansbury; (yellow card) 62' Vaughan | Stadium: Ewood Park; Attendance: 13,876; Referee: Andy Haines |

| 25 April 2015 45 | Ipswich Town | 2–1 | Nottingham Forest | Ipswich |
| 15:00 BST | Murphy 22'; Sears 83'; Anderson (yellow card) 90' | Report | 53' (o.g.) Berra | Stadium: Portman Road; Attendance: 25,199; Referee: Graham Salisbury |

| 5 May 2015 46 | Nottingham Forest | 1–2 | Cardiff City | West Bridgford |
| 12:15 BST | Lascelles (yellow card) 41'; Antonio (yellow card) 45'; Kane (yellow card) 66'; Lansbury (yellow card) 76'; Blackstock 90' | Report | 14' Ralls; (yellow card) 16' Peltier; 24' Doyle; (yellow card) 57' Gunnarsson; (red card) 76' Marshall | Stadium: The City Ground; Attendance: 21,988; Referee: Peter Bankes |

=== FA Cup ===
| 3 January 2015 Third round | Rochdale | 1–0 | Nottingham Forest | Rochdale |
| 15:00 GMT | Vincenti 12' (pen.) | Report | (yellow card) 65' Assombalonga; (yellow card) 86' Burke | Stadium: Spotland Stadium; Attendance: 6,791; Referee: Gary Sutton |

=== Football League Cup ===
| 12 August 2014 First round | Tranmere Rovers | 0–1 | Nottingham Forest | Birkenhead |
| 19:45 BST | | Report | 12' Antonio; (yellow card) 27' Osborn; (yellow card) 33' Hobbs; (yellow card) 45' (yellow-red card) 53' Mancienne | Stadium: Prenton Park; Attendance: 4,374; Referee: David Webb |

| 26 August 2014 Second round | Huddersfield Town | 0–2 | Nottingham Forest | Huddersfield |
| 19:45 BST | Lynch (yellow card) 71' | Report | 72' (o.g.) Vaughan; 82' Lansbury | Stadium: John Smith's Stadium; Attendance: 6,509; Referee: Mark Brown |

| 24 September 2014 Third round | Tottenham Hotspur | 3–1 | Nottingham Forest | Haringey |
| 19:45 BST | Mason 72'; Soldado 83'; Kane 90' | Report | 61' Grant | Stadium: White Hart Lane; Attendance: 31,912; Referee: Andre Marriner |

== Squad statistics ==
=== Appearances and goals ===
As of match played 5 May 2015 (Note: Players whose names are in italics spent time on loan at other clubs during the course of the season.) (Note: Players whose names appear emboldened left the club on a permanent basis having appeared in a competitive fixture this season.)

| No. | Pos | Nat | Player | Total | | Championship | | FA Cup | | League Cup | |
| No. | Pos | Nat | Player | Apps | Goals | Apps | Goals | Apps | Goals | Apps | Goals |
|---|---|---|---|---|---|---|---|---|---|---|---|
| 1 | GK | (England) ENG | Karl Darlow | 44 | 0 | 42 | 0 | 0 | 0 | 2 | 0 |
| 2 | DF | (United States) USA | Eric Lichaj | 44 | 0 | 36+5 | 0 | 1 | 0 | 2 | 0 |
| 3 | DF | (England) ENG | Dan Harding | 10 | 0 | 6+2 | 0 | 0 | 0 | 2 | 0 |
| 4 | DF | (England) ENG | Michael Mancienne | 38 | 0 | 34+2 | 0 | 0 | 0 | 2 | 0 |
| 5 | DF | (Wales) WAL | Danny Collins | 8 | 1 | 7+1 | 1 | 0 | 0 | 0 | 0 |
| 6 | DF | (England) ENG | Kelvin Wilson | 25 | 0 | 22+1 | 0 | 1 | 0 | 1 | 0 |
| 7 | ST | (England) ENG | Matty Fryatt | 26 | 6 | 17+8 | 6 | 0 | 0 | 0+1 | 0 |
| 8 | MF | (England) ENG | Chris Cohen | 6 | 0 | 6 | 0 | 0 | 0 | 0 | 0 |
| 9 | ST | (Democratic Republic of the Congo) COD | Britt Assombalonga | 32 | 15 | 27+2 | 15 | 1 | 0 | 1+1 | 0 |
| 10 | MF | (England) ENG | Henri Lansbury | 40 | 11 | 36+3 | 10 | 0 | 0 | 1 | 1 |
| 11 | MF | (Republic of Ireland) IRL | Andy Reid | 6 | 0 | 6 | 0 | 0 | 0 | 0 | 0 |
| 13 | DF | (Scotland) SCO | Danny Fox | 30 | 0 | 25+2 | 0 | 1 | 0 | 2 | 0 |
| 14 | ST | (Netherlands) NED | Lars Veldwijk | 14 | 0 | 0+11 | 0 | 1 | 0 | 2 | 0 |
| 15 | DF | (England) ENG | Greg Halford | 0 | 0 | 0 | 0 | 0 | 0 | 0 | 0 |
| 16 | DF | (England) ENG | Jamaal Lascelles | 28 | 1 | 20+6 | 1 | 0 | 0 | 2 | 0 |
| 17 | DF | (England) ENG | Jack Hunt | 19 | 0 | 15+2 | 0 | 0 | 0 | 1+1 | 0 |
| 17 | DF | (England) ENG | Todd Kane | 8 | 1 | 7+1 | 1 | 0 | 0 | 0 | 0 |
| 18 | MF | (England) ENG | Michail Antonio | 49 | 15 | 46 | 14 | 1 | 0 | 2 | 1 |
| 19 | MF | (The Gambia) GAM | Modou Barrow | 4 | 0 | 2+2 | 0 | 0 | 0 | 0 | 0 |
| 19 | MF | (England) ENG | Tom Ince | 6 | 0 | 4+2 | 0 | 0 | 0 | 0 | 0 |
| 20 | DF | (England) ENG | Louis Laing | 0 | 0 | 0 | 0 | 0 | 0 | 0 | 0 |
| 21 | ST | (England) ENG | Jamie Paterson | 25 | 1 | 4+17 | 1 | 0+1 | 0 | 3 | 0 |
| 22 | MF | (England) ENG | Gary Gardner | 18 | 4 | 16+2 | 4 | 0 | 0 | 0 | 0 |
| 23 | ST | (Antigua and Barbuda) ANT | Dexter Blackstock | 20 | 5 | 11+8 | 5 | 0 | 0 | 0+1 | 0 |
| 24 | MF | (Wales) WAL | David Vaughan | 15 | 0 | 10+3 | 0 | 1 | 0 | 1 | 0 |
| 25 | DF | (England) ENG | Jack Hobbs | 19 | 0 | 17 | 0 | 1 | 0 | 1 | 0 |
| 26 | GK | (Bulgaria) BUL | Dimitar Evtimov | 0 | 0 | 0 | 0 | 0 | 0 | 0 | 0 |
| 27 | MF | (Scotland) SCO | Chris Burke | 44 | 6 | 34+7 | 6 | 1 | 0 | 1+1 | 0 |
| 28 | MF | (Poland) POL | Radosław Majewski | 0 | 0 | 0 | 0 | 0 | 0 | 0 | 0 |
| 29 | GK | (Netherlands) NED | Dorus de Vries | 6 | 0 | 4 | 0 | 1 | 0 | 1 | 0 |
| 30 | MF | (Republic of Ireland) IRL | Stephen McLaughlin | 9 | 0 | 1+5 | 0 | 0+1 | 0 | 1+1 | 0 |
| 31 | ST | (England) ENG | Chuba Akpom | 7 | 0 | 5+2 | 0 | 0 | 0 | 0 | 0 |
| 32 | MF | (Germany) GER | Robert Tesche | 25 | 2 | 18+4 | 2 | 1 | 0 | 1+1 | 0 |
| 34 | ST | (England) ENG | Tyler Walker | 7 | 1 | 0+7 | 1 | 0 | 0 | 0 | 0 |
| 35 | MF | (Scotland) SCO | Oliver Burke | 3 | 0 | 0+2 | 0 | 0 | 0 | 0+1 | 0 |
| 36 | GK | (England) ENG | Ross Durrant | 0 | 0 | 0 | 0 | 0 | 0 | 0 | 0 |
| 37 | MF | (England) ENG | Jorge Grant | 3 | 1 | 0+1 | 0 | 0 | 0 | 1+1 | 1 |
| 38 | MF | (England) ENG | Ben Osborn | 40 | 3 | 27+10 | 3 | 0 | 0 | 3 | 0 |
| 39 | MF | (Algeria) ALG | Djamel Abdoun | 0 | 0 | 0 | 0 | 0 | 0 | 0 | 0 |

Source: Nottingham Forest F.C.

=== Goal scorers ===
As of match played 5 May 2015

| Rank | No. | Position | Player | Championship | FA Cup | Football League Cup | Total |
|---|---|---|---|---|---|---|---|
| 1 | 9 | Striker | Britt Assombalonga | 15 | 0 | 0 | 15 |
| 1 | 18 | Midfielder | Michail Antonio | 14 | 0 | 1 | 15 |
| 2 | 10 | Midfielder | Henri Lansbury | 10 | 0 | 1 | 11 |
| 3 | 7 | Striker | Matty Fryatt | 6 | 0 | 0 | 6 |
| 3 | 27 | Midfielder | Chris Burke | 6 | 0 | 0 | 6 |
| 4 | 23 | Striker | Dexter Blackstock | 5 | 0 | 0 | 5 |
| 5 | 22 | Midfielder | Gary Gardner | 4 | 0 | 0 | 4 |
| 6 | 38 | Midfielder | Ben Osborn | 3 | 0 | 0 | 3 |
| 6 | Own goals | | | 1 | 0 | 1 | 2 |
| 7 | 32 | Midfielder | Robert Tesche | 2 | 0 | 0 | 2 |
| 8 | 5 | Defender | Danny Collins | 1 | 0 | 0 | 1 |
| 8 | 16 | Defender | Jamaal Lascelles | 1 | 0 | 0 | 1 |
| 8 | 17 | Defender | Todd Kane | 1 | 0 | 0 | 1 |
| 8 | 21 | Striker | Jamie Paterson | 1 | 0 | 0 | 1 |
| 8 | 34 | Striker | Tyler Walker | 1 | 0 | 0 | 1 |
| 8 | 37 | Midfielder | Jorge Grant | 0 | 0 | 1 | 1 |
| TOTAL | | | | 71 | 0 | 4 | 75 |

Source: Nottingham Forest F.C.

=== Disciplinary record ===
As of match played 5 May 2015

| No. | Position | Player | Championship | | FA Cup | | League Cup | | Total | |
| No. | Position | Player | Yellow card | Red card | Yellow card | Red card | Yellow card | Red card | Yellow card | Red card |
| 10 | Midfielder | Henri Lansbury | 13 | 0 | 0 | 0 | 0 | 0 | 13 | 0 |
| 18 | Midfielder | Michail Antonio | 7 | 0 | 0 | 0 | 0 | 0 | 7 | 0 |
| 4 | Defender | Michael Mancienne | 6 | 0 | 0 | 0 | 0 | 1 | 6 | 1 |
| 16 | Defender | Jamaal Lascelles | 6 | 0 | 0 | 0 | 0 | 0 | 6 | 0 |
| 2 | Defender | Eric Lichaj | 5 | 0 | 0 | 0 | 0 | 0 | 5 | 0 |
| 13 | Defender | Danny Fox | 4 | 0 | 0 | 0 | 0 | 0 | 4 | 0 |
| 32 | Midfielder | Robert Tesche | 4 | 0 | 0 | 0 | 0 | 0 | 4 | 0 |
| 9 | Striker | Britt Assombalonga | 2 | 1 | 1 | 0 | 0 | 0 | 3 | 1 |
| 17 | Defender | Jack Hunt | 3 | 0 | 0 | 0 | 0 | 0 | 3 | 0 |
| 22 | Midfielder | Gary Gardner | 3 | 0 | 0 | 0 | 0 | 0 | 3 | 0 |
| 24 | Midfielder | David Vaughan | 3 | 0 | 0 | 0 | 0 | 0 | 3 | 0 |
| 27 | Midfielder | Chris Burke | 2 | 0 | 1 | 0 | 0 | 0 | 3 | 0 |
| 6 | Defender | Kelvin Wilson | 2 | 2 | 0 | 0 | 0 | 0 | 2 | 2 |
| 38 | Midfielder | Ben Osborn | 1 | 0 | 0 | 0 | 1 | 0 | 2 | 0 |
| 1 | Goalkeeper | Karl Darlow | 1 | 0 | 0 | 0 | 0 | 0 | 1 | 0 |
| 7 | Striker | Matty Fryatt | 1 | 0 | 0 | 0 | 0 | 0 | 1 | 0 |
| 8 | Midfielder | Chris Cohen | 1 | 0 | 0 | 0 | 0 | 0 | 1 | 0 |
| 11 | Midfielder | Andy Reid | 1 | 0 | 0 | 0 | 0 | 0 | 1 | 0 |
| 17 | Defender | Todd Kane | 1 | 0 | 0 | 0 | 0 | 0 | 1 | 0 |
| 19 | Midfielder | Tom Ince | 1 | 0 | 0 | 0 | 0 | 0 | 1 | 0 |
| 21 | Striker | Jamie Paterson | 1 | 0 | 0 | 0 | 0 | 0 | 1 | 0 |
| 25 | Defender | Jack Hobbs | 0 | 0 | 0 | 0 | 1 | 0 | 1 | 0 |
| TOTAL | | | 68 | 3 | 2 | 0 | 2 | 1 | 72 | 4 |

Source: Nottingham Forest F.C.
