= Hildeberto Pereira =

Portuguese footballer

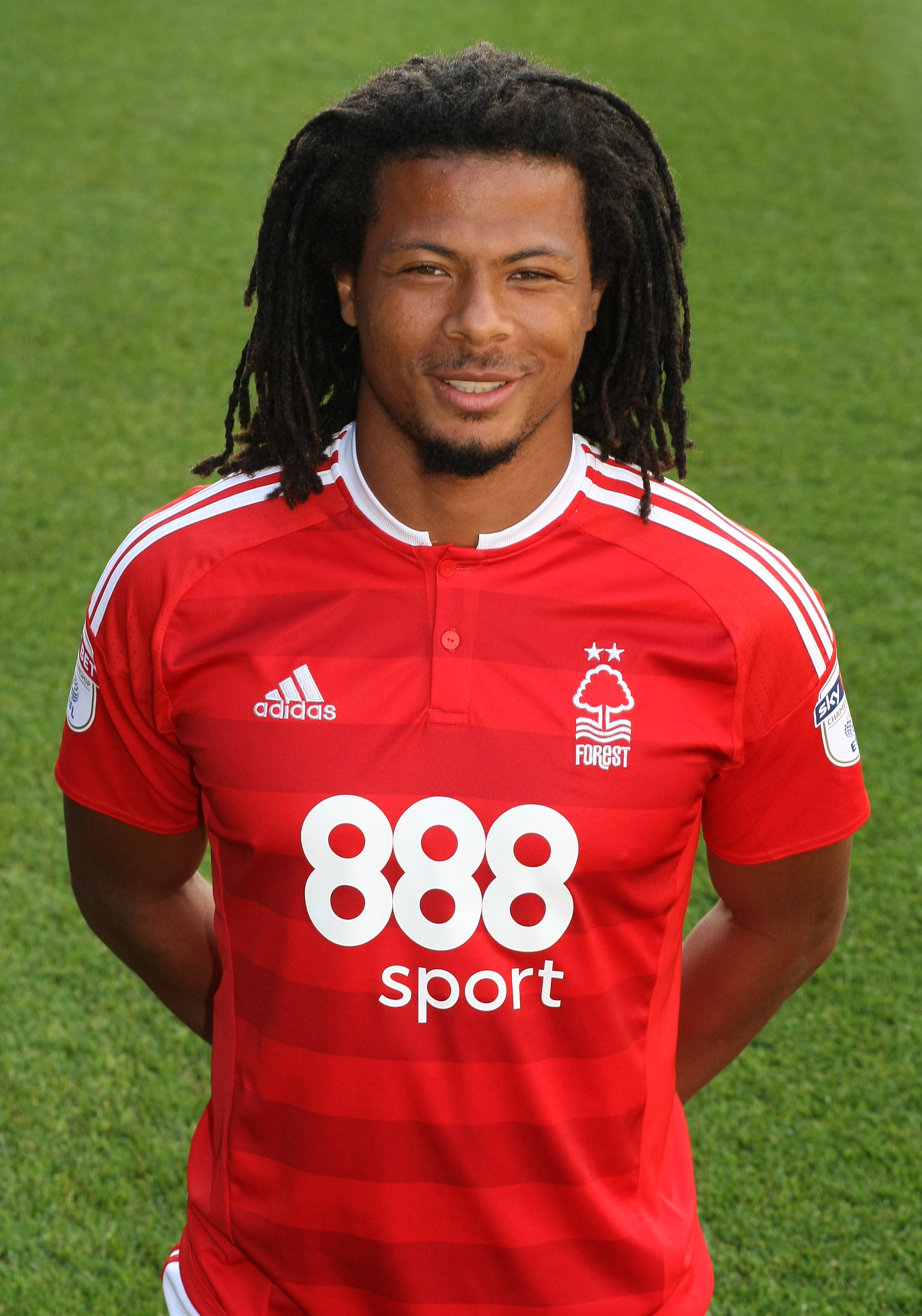
- Pereira with Nottingham Forest in 2016

Personal information
- Full name: Hildeberto José Morgado Pereira
- Date of birth: 2 March 1996 (age 30)
- Place of birth: Lisbon, Portugal
- Height: 1.77 m (5 ft 10 in)
- Position: Winger

Team information
- Current team: Operário Ferroviário

Youth career
- 2009–2010: Ponte Frielas
- 2010–2011: Odivelas
- 2011–2012: Loures
- 2011–2015: Benfica

Senior career*
Years	Team	Apps	(Gls)
2015–2017	Benfica B	40	(4)
2016–2017	→ Nottingham Forest (loan)	25	(2)
2017–2018	Legia Warsaw	7	(2)
2018	Legia Warsaw II	6	(2)
2018	→ Northampton Town (loan)	12	(0)
2018–2020	Vitória Setúbal	60	(8)
2020–2023	Kunshan FC	68	(19)
2023	Henan FC	15	(2)
2023–2024	Portimonense	18	(2)
2024–2025	Universitatea Cluj	8	(1)
2026–	Operário Ferroviário	41	(4)

International career^{‡}
2013–2014	Portugal U18	7	(1)
2014–2015	Portugal U19	6	(2)
2016	Portugal U20	5	(0)
2019–	Cape Verde	2	(0)
- * Club domestic league appearances and goals as of 18 November 2026 ‡ National team caps and goals as of 21 March 2024

Hildeberto José Morgado Pereira (born 2 March 1996), sometimes known as Berto, is a professional footballer who plays as a winger or right-back for Série B club Operário Ferroviário. Born in Portugal, he represents the Cape Verde national team.

== Club career ==
=== Benfica ===
A product of S.L. Benfica's youth system, Pereira debuted for Benfica B on 15 March 2015 in a 3–0 away win at Farense (0–3) in the Segunda Liga. He netted a brace in a victory by the same score at Porto B on 17 May.

On 22 July 2016, Pereira signed a season-long loan deal with English Championship club Nottingham Forest for the 2016–17 season. He scored his first goal for the club in a 3–1 win over Birmingham City on 14 October. Pereira was sent off on 7 November during a 1–1 draw with Queens Park Rangers, which was already his third dismissal of the season following earlier red cards away at Aston Villa on 11 September and at Blackburn Rovers on 18 October. Forest manager Philippe Montanier, was angry that his first caution was collected for dissent and confirmed that the player would be fined by the club.

When Mark Warburton was appointed as Forest manager in March 2017 for the last nine games of the season, Pereira took no further part in the campaign.

=== Legia Warsaw ===
On 10 July 2017, Pereira joined Ekstraklasa side Legia Warsaw on a four-contract with the option of a fifth. He played seven games during his time in the Polish capital, and scored twice on 28 November in a 4–2 home win (7–3 aggregate) over Bytovia Bytów in the quarter-finals of the cup.

Pereira returned to the English Football League on 3 January 2018, joining Northampton Town in League One until the end of the season. On 13 February, as a half-time substitute for Sam Foley, he was sent off in a 2–1 home loss to Gillingham.

Pereira arrived at Legia overweight because of three months without playing, and suffered an injury that ruled him out for a further three. He considered quitting football as a result.

=== Vitória de Setúbal ===
On 2 August 2018, Pereira returned to Portugal and signed a three-year contract with Primeira Liga side Vitória de Setúbal. He scored four times in his first top-flight season, including a hat-trick on 6 October in a 4–0 home win against Moreirense FC.

=== Later career ===
On 6 September 2020, Pereira joined China League One side Kunshan FC. He would go on to establish himself as regular within the team and was part of the squad that won the division and promotion to the top tier at the end of the 2022 China League One campaign. The club was dissolved in March 2023.

On 1 July 2023, Pereira signed with Chinese Super League side Henan FC. At the end of the 2023 season, after having scored 2 goals and provided 4 assists in 15 goals for the club, his contract expired and he became a free agent.

On 8 January 2024, Pereira returned to Portugal, signing a one-and-a-half-year contract with Primeira Liga club Portimonense.

In July 2024, following Portimonense's relegation to Liga Portugal 2, Pereira moved to Romania, joining Liga I club Universitatea Cluj. Four months later, after testing positive for furosemide in a doping test, which he claimed to have taken for "personal reasons" and not for performance enhancement, his contract was terminated by mutual agreement.

On 13 December 2025, after over a year as a free agent, Pereira signed a pre-contract agreement with Brazilian Série B club Operário Ferroviário, with a three-month duration and an automatic renewal clause if certain objectives were met.

== International career ==
Born in Portugal, Pereira is of Cape Verdean descent. He debuted for the Cape Verde national football team in a friendly 2–1 win over Togo on 10 October 2019.

== Career statistics ==
=== Club ===
As of match played 28 October 2024

Appearances and goals by club, season and competition
Club	Season	League			National cup (Note: Includes FA Cup, Polish Cup, Taça de Portugal, Chinese FA Cup)		League cup (Note: Includes EFL Cup, Taça da Liga)		Other		Total	
Club	Season	Division	Apps	Goals	Apps	Goals	Apps	Goals	Apps	Goals	Apps	Goals
Benfica B	2014–15	Segunda Liga	3	2	—		—		—		3	2
Benfica B	2015–16	LigaPro	34	1	—		—		—		34	1
Benfica B	Total		37	3	—		—		—		37	3
Nottingham Forest (loan)	2016–17	Championship	22	2	1	0	2	0	—		25	2
Legia Warsaw	2017–18	Ekstraklasa	3	0	2	2	—		2 (Note: Appearances in UEFA Europa League)	0	7	2
Legia Warsaw II	2017–18	III liga	6	2	—		—		—		6	2
Northampton Town (loan)	2017–18	EFL League One	12	0	—		—		—		12	0
Vitória Setúbal	2018–19	Primeira Liga	26	4	2	0	2	1	—		30	5
Vitória Setúbal	2019–20	Primeira Liga	25	3	1	0	4	0	—		30	3
Vitória Setúbal	Total		51	7	3	0	6	1	0	0	60	8
Kunshan FC	2020	China League One	13	1	2	1	—		—		15	2
Kunshan FC	2021	China League One	28	9	1	1	—		—		29	10
Kunshan FC	2022	China League One	25	8	0	0	—		—		25	8
Kunshan FC	Total		66	18	3	2	0	0	0	0	69	20
Henan FC	2023	Chinese Super League	15	2	0	0	—		—		15	2
Portimonense	2023–24	Primeira Liga	16	2	—		—		2 (Note: Appearances in Primeira Liga-Relegation play-offs)	0	18	2
Universitatea Cluj	2024–25	Liga I	7	1	1	0	—		—		8	1
Career total			235	37	10	4	8	1	4	0	253	42

=== International ===
As of match played 21 March 2024

Appearances and goals by national team and year
National team	Year	Apps	Goals
Cape Verde	2019	1	0
Cape Verde	2024	1	0
Total		2	0

== Honours ==
Legia Warsaw

- Polish Super Cup runner-up: 2018

Kunshan

- China League One: 2022
