= Henri Lansbury =

English footballer (born 1990)

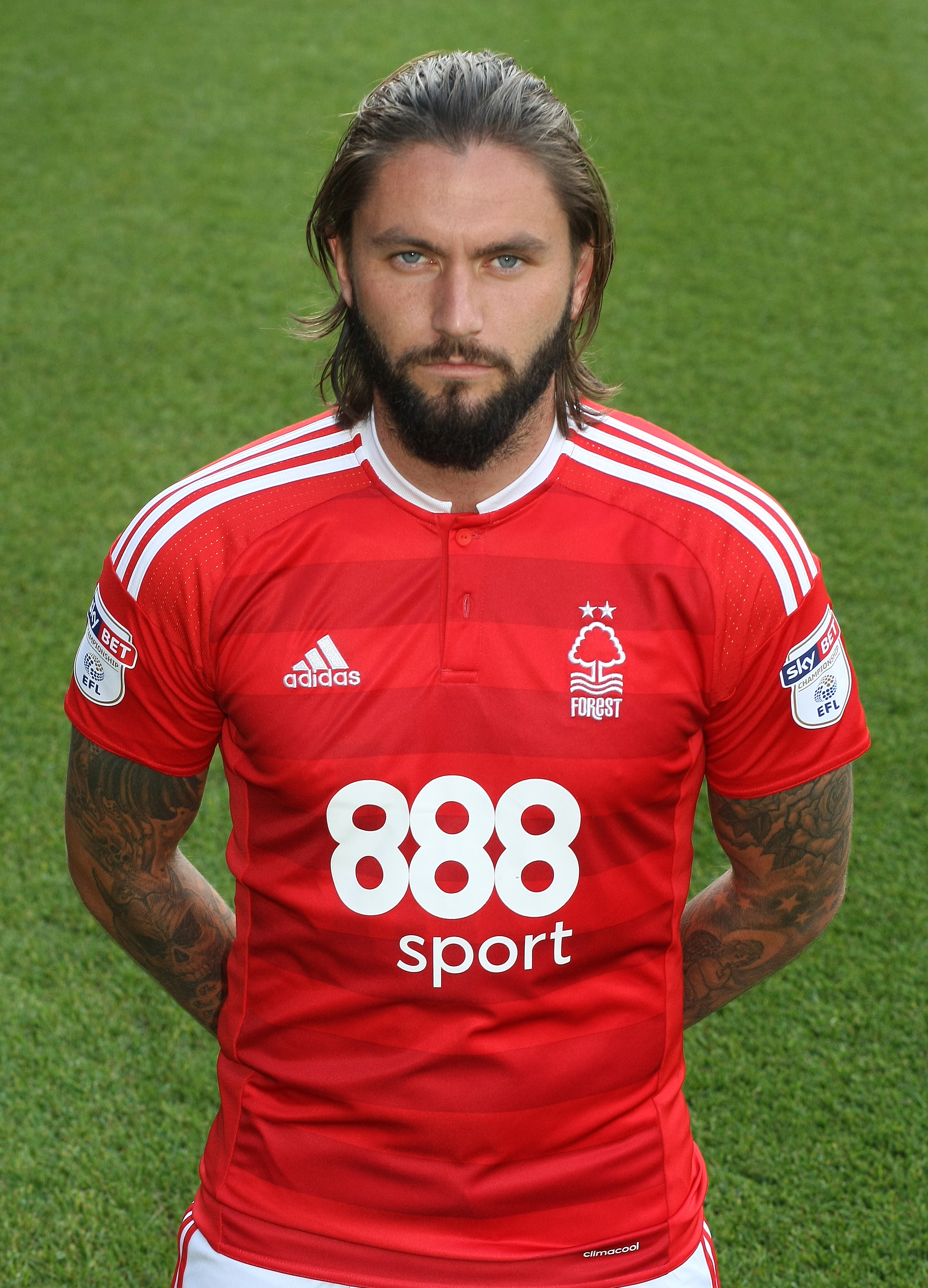
- Lansbury with Nottingham Forest in 2016

Personal information
- Full name: Henri George Lansbury
- Date of birth: 12 October 1990 (age 36)
- Place of birth: Enfield, London, England
- Height: 6 ft 0 in (1.83 m)
- Position: Midfielder

Youth career
- 1998–1999: Norwich City
- 1999–2007: Arsenal

Senior career*
Years	Team	Apps	(Gls)
2007–2012	Arsenal	3	(0)
2009	→ Scunthorpe United (loan)	16	(4)
2009–2010	→ Watford (loan)	37	(5)
2010–2011	→ Norwich City (loan)	23	(4)
2011–2012	→ West Ham United (loan)	22	(1)
2012–2017	Nottingham Forest	145	(32)
2017–2021	Aston Villa	41	(2)
2021	Bristol City	16	(0)
2021–2023	Luton Town	44	(1)
Total		347	(49)

International career
2005–2006	England U16	5	(0)
2006–2007	England U17	14	(4)
2007–2009	England U19	11	(4)
2009–2013	England U21	16	(5)

Managerial career
- 2026–: AFC Turnford
- * Club domestic league appearances and goals

Henri George Lansbury (born 12 October 1990) is an English football manager and former midfielder who is head coach of Herts County League Premier Division club AFC Turnford.

Throughout his career, he played for Arsenal, where he ascended from the club's academy, in addition to spells with sides Scunthorpe United, Watford, Norwich City, Aston Villa, West Ham United and Nottingham Forest, Bristol City and Luton Town. He achieved consecutive promotions to the Premier League in 2010–11 with Norwich and 2011–12 with West Ham.

Lansbury is a former England youth international, winning 16 caps for the under-21 side.

== Club career ==
=== Arsenal ===
Lansbury was born in Enfield, Greater London and grew up in Potters Bar. In 1999, he joined Arsenal as a schoolboy from the books of Norwich City. As such Lansbury featured as a regular for the club's academy sides. He finally made his first-team debut on 31 October 2007, in Arsenal's 3–0 League Cup win over Sheffield United, when he was brought on to replace Theo Walcott in the 83rd minute. Lansbury missed the second half of the 2007–08 season due to glandular fever but returned to fitness in time to participate in pre-season training and the 2008 pre-season friendly games.

He was described by former Arsenal striker Alan Smith as having "huge potential". On 1 July 2008 he signed his first professional contract with Arsenal. but was restricted to cup games at the club. On 31 January 2009, Lansbury went on loan to Scunthorpe United in League One for a month. He scored on his full debut against Swindon Town in the league, adding three further goals during his loan campaign. Lansbury featured in the FA Youth Cup Final for Arsenal, helping them win the trophy over Liverpool, assisting Gilles Sunu on the first goal and Jay Emmanuel-Thomas on the fourth goal in the first leg 4–1 victory.

On 21 August 2009, Lansbury joined Watford on loan until 31 December 2009. He scored his first goals for them with a brace against Sheffield Wednesday on 23 October 2009.

On 31 December 2009, Lansbury signed a new long-term contract with Arsenal. After signing a new deal, manager Arsène Wenger said that Lansbury "will be a big player". He made his Premier League debut for Arsenal on 9 May 2010 against Fulham on the last day of the season, after returning from his loan spell at Watford. Arsenal won the match 4–0. His first goal for the club came against Tottenham Hotspur in the 3rd round of the League Cup, on 21 September 2010. Lansbury played the full 90 minutes and 30 minutes extra time, as the Gunners ran out 4–1 winners against their bitter North London rivals. It was a goal which he said was like a dream.

After impressing against Spurs, Lansbury went on to be named in the Arsenal squad for their UEFA Champions League game against Shakhtar Donetsk but did not make an appearance off the bench. After a successful loan spell at Norwich City for much of the 2010–11 season, making 23 appearances and being involved in nine goals, he returned to his parent club. He made two substitute appearances for Arsenal at the beginning of the season before joining West Ham United at the end of August 2011 on a season long loan for rest of the 2011–12 season. On 13 September 2011, Lansbury signed a contract extension, for an undisclosed period of time, with Arsenal.

==== Loan to Norwich City ====
On 22 November 2010, Lansbury joined Norwich City on a 28-day emergency loan deal to cover for injuries in the City squad. He was given the number 12 shirt and made his debut in the East Anglian derby victory against Ipswich Town on 28 November, setting up a goal for Grant Holt in the process. Lansbury sustained a hamstring injury in the 2–1 away victory over Coventry City. After briefly returning to Arsenal in mid-January, he soon rejoined Norwich on loan until the end of the season. He scored his first two goals for the club in consecutive home games against Millwall and Reading – the former being a stoppage time winner. He became a cult hero after his goal against Leeds United when he celebrated by doing the Dougie made famous by the song Teach Me How to Dougie.

Lansbury missed out on the 2010–11 Football League Championship Young Player of the Year award after fierce competition from Connor Wickham who at the time was playing for Ipswich Town.

==== Loan to West Ham United ====
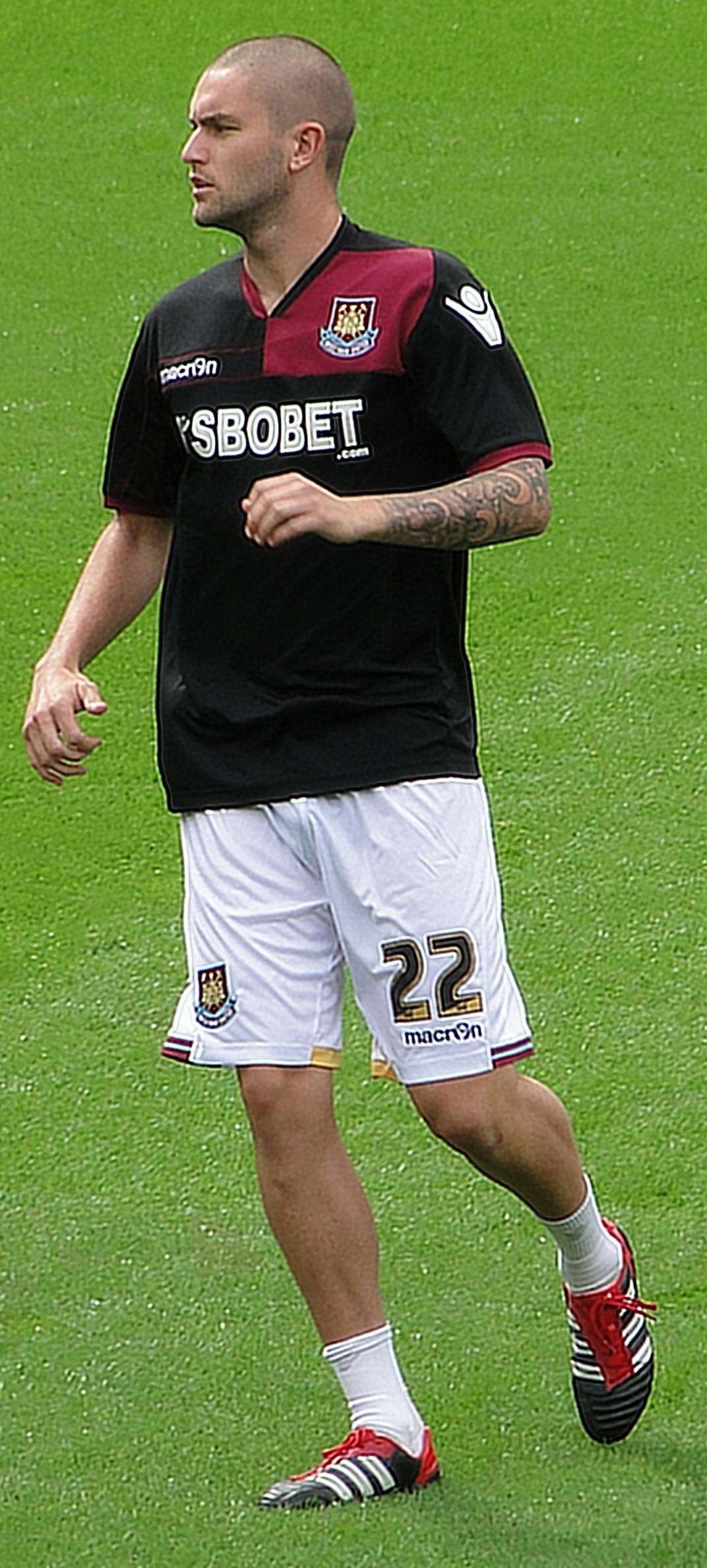
Lansbury warming up for West Ham United in 2011

On 31 August 2011, Lansbury joined West Ham United on a season-long loan from Arsenal. He made his debut on 10 September 2011 in a 4–3 home win against Portsmouth scoring West Ham's second goal, eventually finishing with the Man of the Match accolade. In October 2011, Lansbury was ruled out until Christmas with a knee injury. On 21 February 2012, Lansbury was brought on to play in goal against Blackpool after Robert Green had been sent off for a professional foul with West Ham leading 2–1. Manager Sam Allardyce had not named a goalkeeper amongst his substitutes. West Ham went on to win the game 4–1, and fans chanted "England's Number 1" at the final whistle in tribute to Lansbury's second-half goalkeeping debut, keeping a clean-sheet in the process. West Ham's travelling fans also sang 'Are you Ludo (Hammers favourite Ludek Miklosko) in disguise?' to Lansbury in honour of his emergency shot-stopping stint between the sticks.

Lansbury, with West Ham, won the 2012 Football League Championship play-off final, in a 2–1 beating of Blackpool at Wembley Stadium, a triumph that earned the Irons promotion back to the Premier League.

=== Nottingham Forest ===
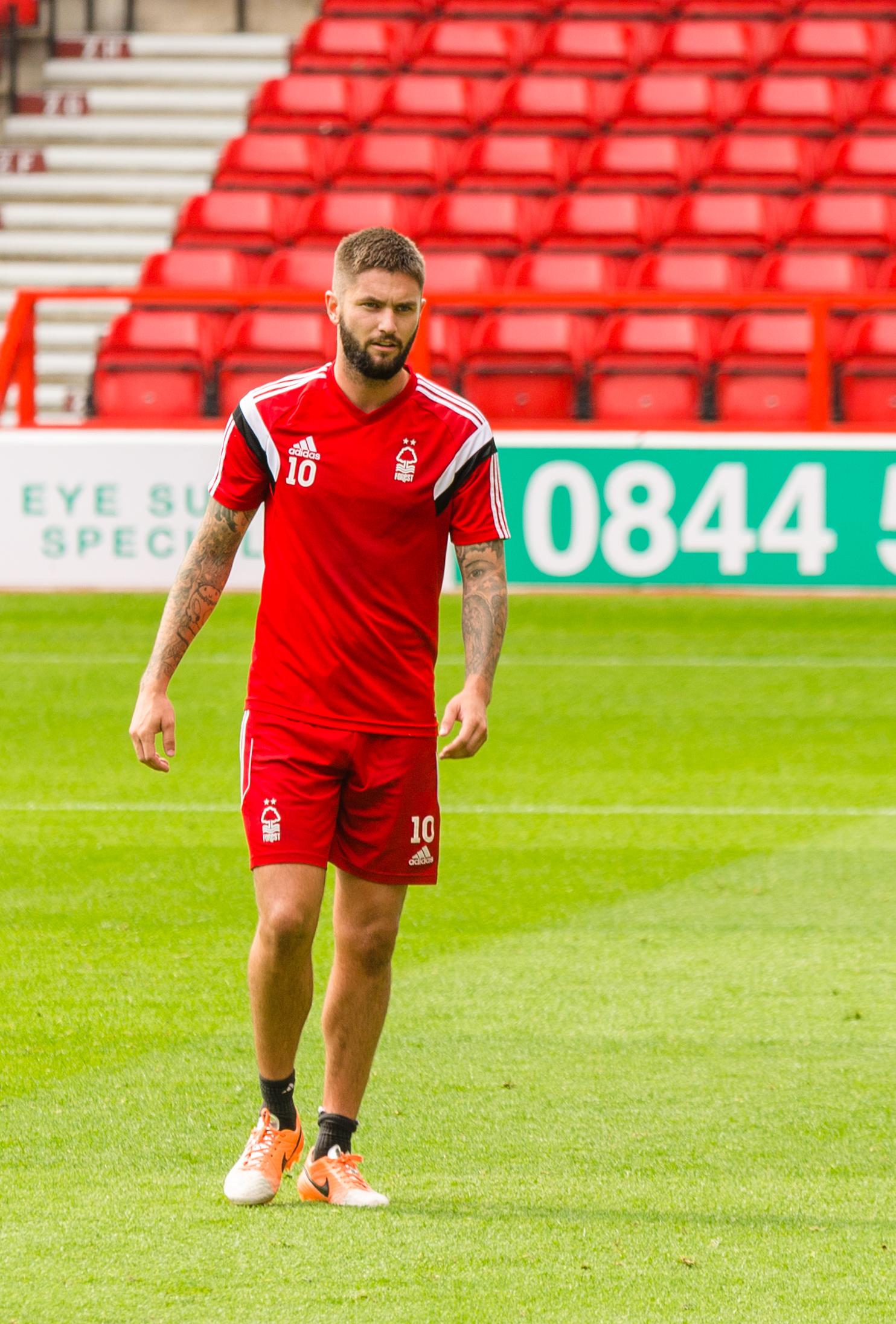
Lansbury in training with Nottingham Forest in 2014

On 28 August 2012, Lansbury joined Football League Championship side Nottingham Forest from Arsenal on a four-year deal for a transfer fee believed to be in excess of £1 million. On 19 February 2013 he scored his first goal for the club by netting the fifth goal in a 6–1 victory over Huddersfield Town. Lansbury scored the first goal of Forest's 2013–14 campaign in the Championship, netting the only goal in a 1–0 victory over Huddersfield Town. Lansbury scored his second goal on his third appearance of the season, in a 3–0 win over Bolton Wanderers.

Having established himself as a regular starter for Forest, Lansbury missed the final months of the 2013–14 season through injury and was strongly linked in the summer with a move to newly promoted Premier League side Burnley. However, Lansbury signed a new three-year contract with Forest on 22 August 2014. He made his return from injury on 26 August 2014, scoring and winning the fan's man of the match award in a 2–0 League Cup second round victory over Huddersfield Town. Lansbury then started Forest's next game in the Championship away at Sheffield Wednesday. He played 68 minutes of the game and scored Forest's winner in the thirty-seventh minute. Lansbury also went on to win the EFL Championship Player of the Month award of February 2015.

Prior to and during the 2015–16 Championship season, Lansbury was once again linked with a transfer to Burnley. Despite the continued media speculation and negotiations between Forest and Burnley, Lansbury's manager Dougie Freedman praised his new captain's attitude and commented that his performance against Rotherham was a "delight to watch". Less than a week after the Rotherham game, a statement was released by Forest on 20 August 2015 confirming that Lansbury had declared his intention to stay at the club.

"His commitment is not in question. That is why he is still the captain, because he plays with commitment for this side. He has always done that. I am sure that will not change. He is a very good player for us; he has been very good for us in the last few games. He has a good mentality; one that is an example to the rest of the squad."

— Former Forest head coach Philippe Montanier on Lansbury.

Lansbury continued to be a first-team regular during the 2016–17 season under the new management of Philippe Montanier, and scored his first career hat-trick on 25 November 2016 to inspire Forest to a 5–2 defeat of Barnsley at Oakwell. After the game Montanier stressed the importance of successfully negotiating a new deal for Lansbury, whose contract was due to expire in the summer of 2017. Lansbury himself expressed a desire to stay at the club in an interview with Sky Sports, describing Forest as his "second home". On 9 December Lansbury was awarded the Championship Player of the Month Award for November, being the second time that he's won such. His outstanding performance in Forest's win over Barnsley was cited as a factor in him being bestowed with the honour by Sky Sports pundit Don Goodman.

In January 2017, and with his contract situation unresolved, Lansbury was the subject of bids from Derby County and Aston Villa, the latter of which was reported to be worth £3 million. Amid the speculation, Lansbury missed Forest's FA Cup defeat at Wigan Athletic on 7 January because his "head was not right to play". On 20 January, after reported interest from Watford, Celtic and Norwich City, Lansbury completed a transfer to Aston Villa to bring an end to his four-and-a-half-year stay at Forest.

=== Aston Villa ===
Lansbury signed for Aston Villa on 20 January 2017 for a reported fee of £3 million. He scored his first goal for the Villans against Leeds United on 1 December 2017 to earn his side a 1–1 draw. However, from the beginning of the 2018-19 EFL Championship campaign onwards, Lansbury found it difficult to find regular game time, playing mostly in cup competitions. At the start of the 2020–21 Premier League season, Lansbury found himself behind John McGinn, Conor Hourihane and Jacob Ramsey in the pecking order. On 15 September 2020, he made his 50th appearance for Aston Villa, after 3 1/2 years with the club, in a 3–1 away victory over Burton Albion in the EFL Cup.

On 20 October 2020, Aston Villa confirmed their squad for the 2020–21 Premier League season, which did not include Lansbury.

On 29 January 2021, Lansbury departed Aston Villa after agreeing a mutual termination of his contract.

=== Bristol City ===
On 29 January 2021, Lansbury joined Championship side Bristol City on a short-term contract until the end of the 2020–21 season. Lansbury made his Bristol City debut on 6 February, in a 2–0 home league defeat to Cardiff City.

=== Luton Town ===
On 14 May 2021, Lansbury left Bristol City following the expiration of his contract and was then immediately signed by Luton Town. In June 2023, Luton confirmed that Lansbury would be leaving the club at the end of the 2022–23 season.

Lansbury announced his retirement from professional football on 17 August 2023, at the age of 32.

== International career ==
Lansbury has featured for England as a youth international. He captained England's U-16 side and helped take their U17s to the final of the 2007 UEFA U-17 European Championship. He went on to miss the final due to a concussion that he suffered during the semi-final of the tournament. Lansbury also held the captain's armband at the U-19 level where he took England to the 2009 UEFA U-19 European Championship final against Ukraine where they emerged as runners up. He scored three goals to end up as the second highest scorer of the tournament altogether.

Lansbury made his debut for the U21 team in a game against Portugal in November 2009. On 16 November 2010, in an England Under-21 friendly to Germany, Lansbury replaced Jason Steele in goal when he was red carded. He let in the resulting penalty by Cenk Tosun but then kept Germany at bay for the rest of the match. Lansbury was called up to England's U-21 squad for the 2011 UEFA Under-21 Championships featuring in all three group stage matches as a substitute. On 1 September 2011 he started for England in a 2013 UEFA Under-21 Championships qualifier against Azerbaijan. In an impressive display he scored twice, assisted two further goals and was named man of the match as England won 6–0. On 29 February 2012, he scored two goals as England U21 secured a play-off spot for Euro 2013 with a 4–0 victory at The Riverside over Belgium U21.

== Post-playing ventures ==
After his retirement, Lansbury committed full-time to his organic fertilizer business Grass Gains. He credits his interest in lawns to a COVID lockdown period when he had to mow the lawn himself after a gardener did a disappointing job. The Grass Gains products are being used at various football pitches across Europe, including Genk, AS Monaco and Fulham.

In an exclusive interview with Sky Sports, Lansbury revealed that he had overcome testicular cancer while at Nottingham Forest.

== Career statistics ==
As of match played 16 August 2023

Appearances and goals by club, season and competition
Club	Season	League			FA Cup		League Cup		Other		Total	
Club	Season	Division	Apps	Goals	Apps	Goals	Apps	Goals	Apps	Goals	Apps	Goals
Arsenal	2007–08	Premier League	0	0	0	0	1	0	0	0	1	0
Arsenal	2008–09	Premier League	0	0	0	0	3	0	0	0	3	0
Arsenal	2009–10	Premier League	1	0	—		—		0	0	1	0
Arsenal	2010–11	Premier League	0	0	—		1	1	0	0	1	1
Arsenal	2011–12	Premier League	2	0	0	0	—		0	0	2	0
Arsenal	Total		3	0	0	0	5	1	0	0	8	1
Scunthorpe United (loan)	2008–09	League One	16	4	—		0	0	2 (Note: Appearances in Football League Trophy)	0	18	4
Watford (loan)	2009–10	Championship	37	5	1	0	1	0	—		39	5
Norwich City (loan)	2010–11	Championship	23	4	0	0	—		—		23	4
West Ham United (loan)	2011–12	Championship	22	1	1	0	—		1 (Note: Appearances in Championship play-offs)	0	24	1
Nottingham Forest	2012–13	Championship	32	5	0	0	0	0	—		32	5
Nottingham Forest	2013–14	Championship	29	7	1	0	0	0	—		30	7
Nottingham Forest	2014–15	Championship	39	10	0	0	1	1	—		40	11
Nottingham Forest	2015–16	Championship	28	4	1	0	0	0	—		29	4
Nottingham Forest	2016–17	Championship	17	6	0	0	2	0	—		19	6
Nottingham Forest	Total		145	32	2	0	3	1	—		150	33
Aston Villa	2016–17	Championship	18	0	0	0	—		—		18	0
Aston Villa	2017–18	Championship	10	2	1	0	1	0	0	0	12	2
Aston Villa	2018–19	Championship	3	0	1	0	1	0	0	0	5	0
Aston Villa	2019–20	Premier League	10	0	1	0	4	0	—		15	0
Aston Villa	2020–21	Premier League	0	0	0	0	3	0	—		3	0
Aston Villa	Total		41	2	3	0	9	0	0	0	53	2
Bristol City	2020–21	Championship	16	0	0	0	—		—		16	0
Luton Town	2021–22	Championship	31	0	1	0	1	0	—		33	0
Luton Town	2022–23	Championship	10	1	0	0	1	0	—		11	1
Luton Town	Total		41	1	1	0	2	0	0	0	44	1
Career total			344	49	8	0	20	2	3	0	375	51

== Honours ==
Arsenal Youth

- FA Youth Cup: 2008–09

Scunthorpe United

- Football League Trophy runner-up: 2008–09

Norwich City

- Football League Championship second-place promotion: 2010–11

West Ham United

- Football League Championship play-offs: 2012

Aston Villa

- EFL Championship play-offs: 2019
- EFL Cup runner-up: 2019–20

England U19

- UEFA European Under-19 Championship runner-up: 2009

Individual

- Football League/EFL Championship Player of the Month: February 2015, November 2016
