= Oliver Burke =

Scottish footballer (born 1997)

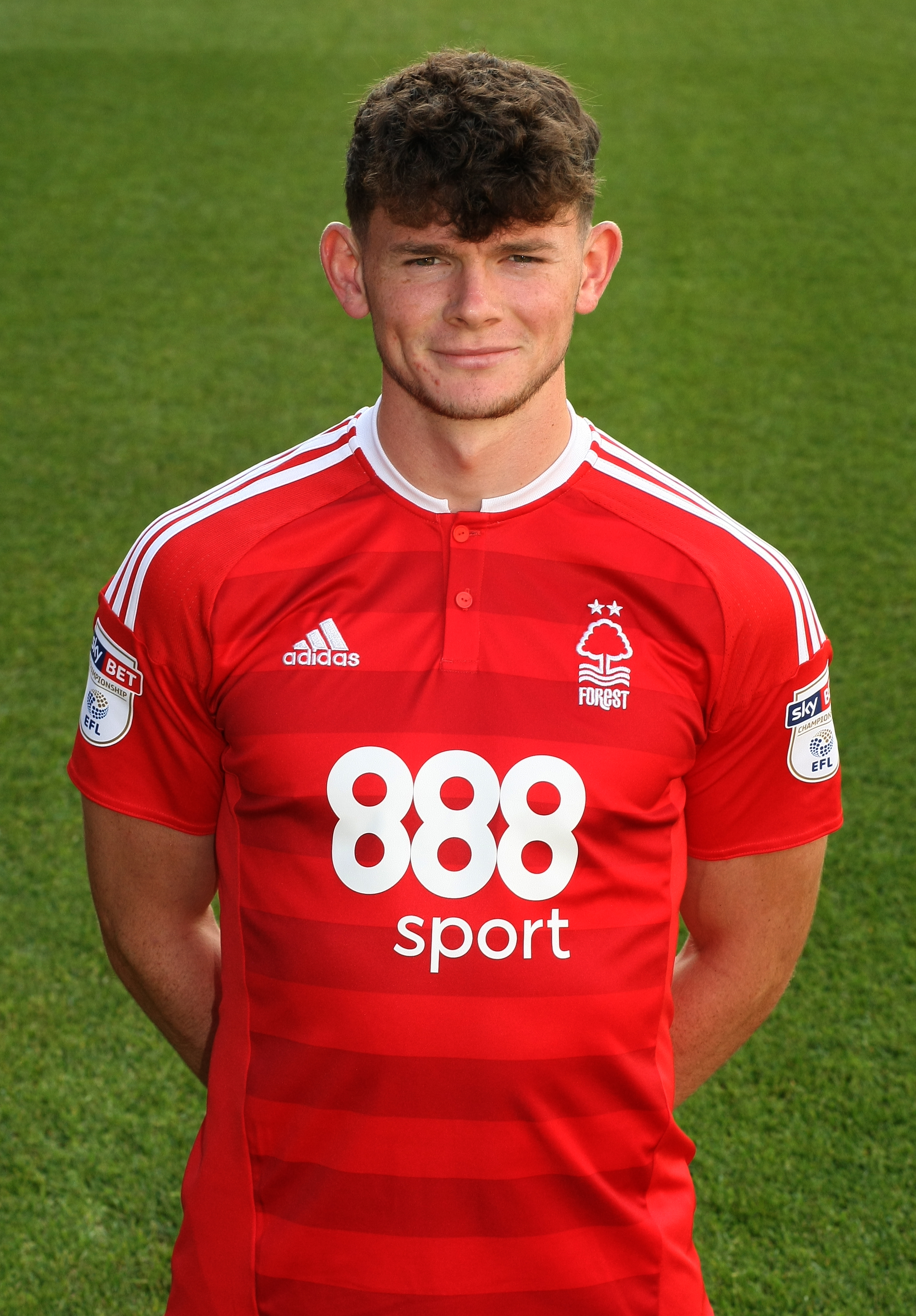
- Burke with Nottingham Forest in 2016

Personal information
- Full name: Oliver Jasen Burke
- Date of birth: 7 April 1997 (age 29)
- Place of birth: Kirkcaldy, Scotland
- Height: 6 ft 2 in (1.88 m)
- Positions: Right winger; forward

Team information
- Current team: Union Berlin
- Number: 7

Youth career
- 2004–2005: Mowbray Rangers
- 2005–2015: Nottingham Forest

Senior career*
Years	Team	Apps	(Gls)
2014–2016	Nottingham Forest	25	(6)
2015	→ Bradford City (loan)	2	(0)
2016–2017	RB Leipzig	25	(1)
2017–2020	West Bromwich Albion	20	(0)
2019	→ Celtic (loan)	14	(4)
2019–2020	→ Alavés (loan)	31	(1)
2020–2022	Sheffield United	28	(1)
2022	→ Millwall (loan)	14	(2)
2022–2025	Werder Bremen	41	(7)
2023	→ Millwall (loan)	17	(2)
2023–2024	→ Birmingham City (loan)	21	(0)
2025–	Union Berlin	32	(6)

International career
2015–2016	Scotland U19	6	(1)
2017	Scotland U20	4	(2)
2017–2018	Scotland U21	9	(4)
2016–2020	Scotland	13	(1)
- * Club domestic league appearances and goals as of 17:30, 1 November 2026 (UTC)

Oliver Jasen Burke (born 7 April 1997) is a Scottish professional footballer who plays as a right winger or forward for Bundesliga club Union Berlin.

He came through the academy at Nottingham Forest, signing a professional contract in September 2014 and making his debut the following February. In August 2016, Burke signed for Bundesliga club RB Leipzig for a reported fee of £13 million, a record fee for a Scottish player. A year later, having helped Leipzig to runners-up position in the league, he returned to England by signing for West Bromwich Albion for a fee of £15 million. Following an unsuccessful few years at West Bromwich Albion, and loan spells at Celtic and Alavés, Burke joined Sheffield United in September 2020 in a swap deal involving Callum Robinson. He played regularly in his first season at Sheffield United, but spent the second half of the next season on loan at Millwall and then returned to German football with Werder Bremen. After half a season, he rejoined Millwall on loan, and 2023 signed for Birmingham City, also on loan. In May 2025, Oliver Burke signed with Bundesliga side Union Berlin.

== Club career ==
=== Nottingham Forest ===
Burke was born in Kirkcaldy, Scotland, but grew up in Melton Mowbray, Leicestershire, England where he joined local club Mowbray Rangers aged eight. After one season at the club, he was scouted to join Nottingham Forest's Academy where he progressed for the next nine years. Burke signed his first professional contract with Nottingham Forest on 19 September 2014, before making his professional debut as an 87th-minute substitute during a 3–1 loss to Tottenham Hotspur on 24 September. He made his league debut on 14 February 2015 as a 64th-minute substitute in a 4–4 draw away to Blackpool.

Burke was sent on a month-long loan to League One club Bradford City on 24 February. He made his debut for them on the same day, playing for 75 minutes in a 2–1 loss away to Swindon Town. Burke made another start on 28 February in a 2–0 loss against Peterborough United and appeared twice as an unused substitute before returning to his parent club. After his loan spell at Bradford City came to an end, Burke signed a three-year contract with Forest.

Ahead of the 2015–16 season, Burke signed another three-year contract with the club on 29 July. Burke played for the club's reserves until December when he was called up to the first team by manager Dougie Freedman, whom Burke considered his mentor. On 29 December, Burke scored his first goal for Forest from a curling shot hit with the outside of his right foot against Cardiff City. His goal opened the scoring at the Cardiff City Stadium nine minutes into the game, which ended 1–1. Burke scored his second goal for the club on 16 January 2016 in a 3–0 win over Bolton Wanderers. His performance once again earned a contract extension on a four-year deal on 29 February. Burke ended the 2015–16 season having made twenty-one appearances in all competitions and scoring twice.

Ahead of the 2016–17 season Burke made an impression in the pre-season friendlies, scoring three times in six matches. Under the new management of Philippe Montanier, Burke scored in the opening game of the season, a 4–3 win over Burton Albion, and scored a brace two weeks later against Wigan Athletic. Burke scored on his final appearance for Forest on 27 August, a 3–1 defeat of Leeds United. Burke's early season form and performances attracted the interest of leading European and Premier League clubs, such as Bayern Munich, Manchester United, Sunderland and Liverpool. However, Montanier dismissed suggestions of Burke leaving Forest.

=== RB Leipzig ===
On 28 August 2016, in a move that caused outrage among Forest supporters, who criticised the club's owner Fawaz Al-Hasawi, Burke joined newly promoted Bundesliga club RB Leipzig on a five-year contract for an undisclosed fee. The deal was reported by BBC Sport to be worth around £13 million, which set a new record for a transfer involving a Scottish player.

On his debut for Leipzig, a home Bundesliga game against Borussia Dortmund on 10 September, Burke came on after 69 minutes in place of Yussuf Poulsen and provided an assist for Naby Keïta to score the only goal. Fifteen days later he opened the scoring in a 1–1 draw at 1. FC Köln, becoming the first Scot to score in Germany's top flight since Brian O'Neil for VfL Wolfsburg in November 1999.

Despite this early impact, Burke was regularly used as a substitute by Leipzig. Their coaching staff praised his physical attributes, but questioned his tactical awareness.

=== West Bromwich Albion ===
Burke returned to English football on 25 August 2017, moving to Premier League club West Bromwich Albion for a reported fee of £15 million, breaking his own record as the most expensive Scottish footballer. He signed a five-year contract at the West Midlands club. Burke said that he chose West Bromwich Albion as a way to have more game time, even though with Leipzig he could play in the Champions League.

He made his debut two days later, replacing goalscorer Jay Rodriguez for the final two minutes of a 1–1 home draw against Stoke City. Owing to hamstring injury, he made only one other substitute appearance by mid-November and took part with the under-21 team in the EFL Trophy, scoring in a 2–1 group stage defeat at Coventry City on 7 November.

On 14 August 2018, Burke scored his first goal for the Baggies, the game's only in a home win over Luton Town in the first round of the EFL Cup. He made only six total appearances in the first half of the season, of which three were in the Championship, all from the bench.

==== Celtic (loan) ====
Burke moved on loan to Celtic on 5 January 2019 until the end of the season. He made his debut two weeks later, playing the full 90 minutes of a 3–0 home win over Airdrieonians in the Scottish Cup. On 23 January, his Scottish Premiership debut, he played as a striker in the absence of Leigh Griffiths and Odsonne Édouard and netted twice in a 4–0 win against St Mirren at Celtic Park, his first league goals since September 2016.

==== Loan to Alavés ====
On 30 August 2019, Burke was loaned to La Liga club Alavés for the season. Burke made his debut for his new club in their 1–0 defeat to Sevilla on 15 September, and scored his first goal for Alavés in a 2–1 La Liga win over Eibar on 7 February 2020.

=== Sheffield United ===
Sheffield United signed Burke from West Bromwich Albion on a three-year contract in September 2020; Callum Robinson moved in the opposite direction. Burke scored his first goal for the club in a 2–1 away league win over Manchester United on 27 January 2021, clinching their first league win against Manchester United since 1992 and their first win at Old Trafford since 1973.

==== Millwall (loan) ====
On 21 January 2022, Burke joined Championship rivals Millwall on loan until the end of the 2021–22 season.

=== Werder Bremen ===
In June 2022 Burke returned to the Bundesliga, joining newly promoted Werder Bremen. He reportedly moved on a free transfer.

Burke scored his first goal for Bremen on 13 August 2022, netting late to secure a 2–2 draw with VfB Stuttgart. A week later, he scored the decisive goal in a dramatic, come-from-behind 3–2 win at Borussia Dortmund.

In January 2023 Burke returned to former club Millwall on loan until the end of the season.

==== Birmingham City (loan) ====
After making two appearances for Bremen in August 2023, Burke again returned to the EFL Championship on 1 September, the last day of the transfer window, when he signed for Birmingham City on loan for the 2023–24 season. He failed to scored in 23 appearances in all competitions, of which half were as a starter, and played hardly at all in the second half of the season, partly due to injury, as Birmingham were relegated.

=== Union Berlin ===
On 26 May 2025, Burke signed with Bundesliga side Union Berlin.

On 21 September 2025, Burke scored a hat-trick in a 4-3 league win over Eintracht Frankfurt, becoming the first Scotsman to score a hat-trick in the Bundesliga.

== International career ==
Burke was eligible to play for England in addition to Scotland, having been brought up south of the border from a young age, but he opted to play for his country of birth. He was first called up by Scotland U19 and scored on his debut for the team, a 3–1 win against Mexico U18, on 6 October 2015. He went on to make six appearances for the side.

Burke received his first call-up to the senior Scotland squad on 10 March 2016 for their friendly match against Denmark. He made his debut as an 82nd-minute substitute for goalscorer Matt Ritchie in the 1–0 win at Hampden Park 19 days later.

He was left out of the full squad in June 2017, and was a late call-up to the under-20 squad for the 2017 Toulon Tournament. Burke scored both goals in a 3–2 defeat against the Czech Republic. As captain, Scotland claimed a historic first ever victory against Brazil at any level, in the second match. The team went on to win the bronze medal. It was the nation's first ever medal at the competition.

During the 2017–18 season, Burke was selected in the under-21 squad. He made his debut at that level on 5 September, and he scored the first goal in a 2–0 win against the Netherlands. In the 2018 Toulon Tournament, Burke scored goals against France and South Korea as Scotland finished in fourth place. In the third-place play-off against Turkey, he was the only player to miss in the penalty shootout defeat, with Altay Bayındır saving his attempt.

Burke was recalled to the full international squad in March 2019 and scored his only senior goal in Scotland's 2–1 victory over Cyprus on 8 June the same year.

== Personal life ==
Burke became engaged to television personality Megan McKenna in June 2023. They live in Germany. In October 2024, the couple welcomed their first child and Burke's second son. Burke also has an older son from a former relationship. In June 2025, Burke and McKenna got married.

== Career statistics ==
=== Club ===
As of match played 1 November 2026

Appearances and goals by club, season and competition
Club	Season	League			National cup (Note: Includes FA Cup, DFB-Pokal, Scottish Cup, Copa del Rey)		League cup (Note: Includes Football League Cup / EFL Cup)		Europe		Other		Total	
Club	Season	Division	Apps	Goals	Apps	Goals	Apps	Goals	Apps	Goals	Apps	Goals	Apps	Goals
Nottingham Forest	2014–15	Championship	2	0	0	0	1	0	—		—		3	0
Nottingham Forest	2015–16	Championship	18	2	2	0	1	0	—		—		21	2
Nottingham Forest	2016–17	Championship	5	4	—		2	0	—		—		7	4
Nottingham Forest	Total		25	6	2	0	4	0	—		—		31	6
Bradford City (loan)	2014–15	League One	2	0	—		—		—		—		2	0
RB Leipzig	2016–17	Bundesliga	25	1	0	0	—		—		—		25	1
RB Leipzig	2017–18	Bundesliga	0	0	1	0	—		—		—		1	0
RB Leipzig	Total		25	1	1	0	—		—		—		26	1
West Bromwich Albion	2017–18	Premier League	15	0	1	0	0	0	—		—		16	0
West Bromwich Albion	2018–19	Championship	3	0	—		2	1	—		—		5	1
West Bromwich Albion	2019–20	Championship	2	0	—		1	0	—		—		3	0
West Bromwich Albion	Total		20	0	1	0	3	1	—		—		24	1
West Bromwich Albion U21	2017–18	—	—		—		—		—		2 (Note: Appearance(s) in EFL Trophy)	1	2	1
West Bromwich Albion U21	2018–19	—	—		—		—		—		1	0	1	0
West Bromwich Albion U21	Total		—		—		—		—		3	1	3	1
Celtic (loan)	2018–19	Scottish Premiership	14	4	3	0	—		2 (Note: Appearances in UEFA Europa League)	0	—		19	4
Alavés (loan)	2019–20	La Liga	31	1	1	0	0	0	—		—		32	1
Sheffield United	2020–21	Premier League	25	1	4	1	1	0	—		—		30	2
Sheffield United	2021–22	Championship	3	0	1	0	2	0	—		—		6	0
Sheffield United	Total		28	1	5	1	3	0	—		—		36	2
Millwall (loan)	2021–22	Championship	14	2	0	0	0	0	—		—		14	2
Werder Bremen	2022–23	Bundesliga	15	2	2	0	—		—		—		17	2
Werder Bremen	2023–24	Bundesliga	1	0	1	0	—		—		—		2	0
Werder Bremen	2024–25	Bundesliga	25	5	2	1	—		—		—		27	6
Werder Bremen	Total		41	7	5	1	—		—		—		46	8
Millwall (loan)	2022–23	Championship	17	2	0	0	0	0	—		—		17	2
Birmingham City (loan)	2023–24	Championship	21	0	2	0	—		—		—		23	0
Union Berlin	2025–26	Bundesliga	29	6	2	0	—		—		—		31	6
Union Berlin	2026–27	Bundesliga	3	0	0	0	—		—		—		3	0
Union Berlin	Total		32	6	2	0	—		—		—		34	6
Career total			270	30	22	2	10	1	2	0	3	1	307	34

=== International ===
As of 3 September 2023

Appearances and goals by national team and year
National team	Year	Apps	Goals
Scotland	2016	4	0
Scotland	2017	1	0
Scotland	2019	6	1
Scotland	2020	2	0
Total		13	1

As of match played 8 June 2019
Scores and results list Scotland's goal tally first, score column indicates score after each Burke goal.

List of international goals scored by Oliver Burke
No.	Date	Venue	Opponent	Score	Result	Competition	Ref.
1	8 June 2019	Hampden Park, Glasgow, Scotland	Cyprus	2–1	2–1	UEFA Euro 2020 qualifying	

== Honours ==
Celtic

- Scottish Premiership: 2018–19
