= James Thorne (footballer) =

English footballer

Personal information
- Full name: James Samuel Thorne
- Date of birth: 3 January 1996 (age 30)
- Place of birth: Manchester, England
- Position: Forward

Youth career
- –2014: Manchester City
- 2015–2017: Nottingham Forest

Senior career*
Years	Team	Apps	(Gls)
2014–2015	Salford City	3	(0)
2015	Macclesfield Town	0	(0)
2016–2017	Nottingham Forest	0	(0)
2017	→ Macclesfield Town (loan)	6	(0)
2017	Hartlepool United	2	(0)
2018	Curzon Ashton		
- * Club domestic league appearances and goals as of 17:00, 7 October 2017

James Samuel Thorne is an English professional footballer who most recently played for Hartlepool United as a forward.

== Club career ==
=== Early career ===
Having progressed through the academy at his hometown club Manchester City, Thorne was released in 2014 without having made a first-team appearance. Following this, he had a short spell with Salford City before signing on non-contract terms with Macclesfield Town in 2015, for whom he made one appearance on the bench. Later that year, Thorne joined the academy at Nottingham Forest.

=== Nottingham Forest ===
Thorne began the 2015–16 season for Forest's under-21 side in fine form, scoring four goals in three games in the Professional Development League. As his form continued, clubs in Football Leagues One and Two were reported to be interested in taking Thorne on loan, but no move ever materialised. The following season, Thorne made his professional debut for the club on 23 August 2016, starting in a 2–1 win over Millwall in the EFL Cup. On 24 February 2017 Thorne returned to Macclesfield Town on a one-month loan deal, having failed to make another first-team appearance for Forest.

=== Hartlepool United ===
Thorne signed for Hartlepool United on 28 September 2017, following a successful trial period with the North-East club.

== Career statistics ==
As of match played 29 April 2017

Club	Season	League			Cup		League Cup		Other		Total	
Club	Season	Division	Apps	Goals	Apps	Goals	Apps	Goals	Apps	Goals	Apps	Goals
Macclesfield Town	2014–15	Conference Premier	0	0	0	0	0	0	—		0	0
Macclesfield Town	Total		0	0	0	0	0	0	—		0	0
Nottingham Forest	2015–16	Championship	0	0	0	0	0	0	—		0	0
Nottingham Forest	2016–17	Championship	0	0	0	0	1	0	—		1	0
Nottingham Forest	Total		0	0	0	0	1	0	—		1	0
Macclesfield Town (loan)	2016–17	National League	6	0	0	0	0	0	1 (Note: Refers to appearances made in the FA Trophy for Macclesfield Town)	0	7	0
Career total			6	0	0	0	1	0	1	0	8	0
