= Tim Erlandsson =

Swedish footballer

Personal information
- Full name: Tim Anders Junior Erlandsson
- Date of birth: 25 December 1996 (age 29)
- Place of birth: Halmstad, Sweden
- Height: 1.94 m (6 ft 4 1/2 in)
- Position: Goalkeeper

Team information
- Current team: Odd
- Number: 1

Youth career
- –2015: Halmstads BK
- 2014–2015: → Nottingham Forest (loan)
- 2015–2016: Nottingham Forest

Senior career*
Years	Team	Apps	(Gls)
2016–2019	Nottingham Forest	0	(0)
2016	→ Barrow (loan)	2	(0)
2017	→ AFC Eskilstuna (loan)	13	(0)
2018	→ Salford City (loan)	8	(0)
2019	IK Frej	0	(0)
2020–2023	Falkenbergs FF	44	(0)
2024–2026	Halmstads BK	38	(0)
2026–	IF Elfsborg	0	(0)
2026–	→ Odd (loan)	10	(0)

International career^{‡}
2013	Sweden U17	1	(0)
2013–2015	Sweden U19	8	(0)
2016–2017	Sweden U21	7	(0)
- * Club domestic league appearances and goals as of 14 November 2026 ‡ National team caps and goals as of 10 June 2017

Tim Anders Junior Erlandsson (born 25 December 1996) is a Swedish footballer who plays as a goalkeeper for Allsvenskan club IF Elfsborg.

== Club career ==
=== Nottingham Forest ===
On 2 June 2015, Erlandsson signed a three-year contract with Nottingham Forest, for whose under-18 side he had spent a successful season on loan from Halmstads BK.

==== Loan spells ====
On 25 November 2016, Erlandsson signed a one-month loan deal with Barrow as cover for injured first-choice goalkeeper Joel Dixon. Erlandsson made his debut for Barrow the following day as his new club defeated Dagenham & Redbridge 4–1. In spite of efforts by Barrow to extend Erlandsson's loan spell, the goalkeeper returned to Forest on 25 December in order to experience football in a higher division. On 20 January 2017, Erlandsson was loaned to newly promoted Allsvenskan club AFC Eskilstuna until 5 November; the end of the Swedish football season. He made his league debut for the club on 2 April 2017 in a 3–1 away loss to GIF Sundsvall. After time back in Nottingham, Erlandsson again moved out on a one-month loan to National League North club Salford City on 16 March 2018. His league debut for the club came on 20 March 2018 in a 1–1 away draw with North Ferriby United.

In January 2019, Erlandsson parted ways with Forest to return to Sweden.

=== IK Frej ===
On 23 January 2019, Erlandsson joined Superettan team IK Frej.

Erlandsson opted to leave Frej in June 2019, without making a first-team appearance, and take a break from playing professional football due to mental health issues around anxiety.

=== Falkenbergs FF ===
On 29 November 2019, Erlandsson joined Falkenbergs FF ahead of their 2020 season in the Allsvenskan.

=== Halmstad ===
On 17 December 2023, Erlandsson signed a contract with his hometown club Halmstads BK for the 2024 and 2025 seasons.

== International career ==
In July 2016, Erlandsson was named to Sweden U23 that participated in the 2016 Summer Olympics.

Erlandsson was first called up to the senior Sweden national team in January 2017 for friendlies against the Ivory Coast and Slovakia, remaining on the bench in both.

== Career statistics ==
As of match played 29 September 2024

Appearances and goals by club, season and competition
Club	Season	League			National Cup (Note: Includes FA Cup, Svenska Cupen)		Other		Total	
Club	Season	Division	Apps	Goals	Apps	Goals	Apps	Goals	Apps	Goals
Barrow (loan)	2016-17	National League	2	0	1	0	2 (Note: Appearance(s) in FA Trophy)	0	5	0
Eskilstuna (loan)	2017	Allsvenskan	13	0	1	0	—		14	0
Salford City (loan)	2017–18	National League North	8	0	0	0	0	0	8	0
Frej	2019	Superettan	0	0	1	0	0	0	1	0
Falkenberg	2020	Allsvenskan	0	0	1	0	—		1	0
Falkenberg	2021	Superettan	2	0	1	0	—		3	0
Falkenberg	2022	Ettan	25	0	3	0	0	0	28	0
Falkenberg	2023	Ettan	17	0	0	0	2 (Note: Appearance(s) in Promotion/Relegation play-offs)	0	19	0
Falkenberg	Total		44	0	5	0	2	0	51	0
Halmstad	2024	Allsvenskan	15	0	1	0	0	0	16	0
Career total			82	0	9	0	4	0	95	0

== Honours ==
Sweden U17

- FIFA U-17 World Cup Third place: 2013
