= Fawaz Al-Hasawi =

Kuwaiti businessman

- Born: 25 October 1968 (age 58)
- Occupation: Chairman of Nottingham Forest Football Club

Fawaz Mubarak Al-Hasawi (born 25 October 1968) is a Kuwaiti businessman and was the owner and chairman of Nottingham Forest Football Club.

== Biography ==
=== Qadsia SC ===
Between 2010 and 2012, Fawaz was president of Qadsia SC, one of the largest sporting clubs in Kuwait. His tenure was a successful one, with the club winning two Kuwait Premier League titles and two Emir Cups along with the Federation Cup and the Super Cup.

=== Nottingham Forest ===
On 11 July 2012, it was announced that the Al-Hasawi family had purchased Nottingham Forest from the estate of the late Nigel Doughty.

At the time of the takeover, Forest were in a stage of considerable turmoil. The sudden death of previous chairman and benefactor Doughty had left the club in a position of financial uncertainty. The club had only narrowly avoided relegation to League One and the uncertainty over the club's fortunes had led to Forest only boasting a handful of first team players. A huge overhaul was needed and the Al-Hasawi family did not hesitate to make their mark, dismissing manager Steve Cotterill quickly and replacing him with former Forest coach Sean O'Driscoll. This was quickly followed by a considerable number of player purchases, with the club spending more than £6m bringing in a number of signings.

On 15 December 2012, Fawaz Al-Hasawi made the decision to take over the role of chairman, succeeding his cousin Omar Al-Hasawi. Following a 4–2 victory over Leeds United, and with Forest firmly involved in the Championship promotion battle, Fawaz made the surprise decision to dismiss manager O'Driscoll. Al-Hasawi had received advice from the board of Hull City that a manager with Premier League experience is needed to secure promotion. He originally planned to sack O'Driscoll on Christmas Day, but Forest Chief Executive Mark Arthur refused to follow the order until the following day.

On 27 December 2012, Al-Hasawi appointed former Aston Villa and Birmingham City manager Alex McLeish. McLeish's available transfer funds were significantly lower than the £3 million he had been promised by Al-Hasawi, and a move for Peterborough United midfielder George Boyd fell through, reportedly due to a failed eye test. This was described as a "complete disgrace" by Peterborough chairman Darragh MacAnthony. After only forty days in charge, McLeish parted ways with Forest by mutual agreement on 5 February 2013 and was replaced by Billy Davies.

Fawaz subsequently become more involved with the press, including interviews with BBC sports journalists, and even referred to Billy Davies as a possible Forest equivalent to Alex Ferguson, and spoke of Forest returning to a UEFA Champions League level at some point in the future. However, this coincided with a significantly diminished relationship between the football side of the club and the media due to a series of media bans and restrictions imposed by Davies. In March 2014, following a poor run of results and a breakdown in the relationship between himself and Fawaz, Billy Davies became the fourth manager to be dismissed during the Al-Hazawi period of ownership.

Following the dismissal of Davies, it was widely reported that Neil Warnock was offered the Forest manager's position, but rejected it due to Fawaz expressing an intention to interfere with team selection. It was subsequently announced that Forest's youth team coach Gary Brazil would manage the first team until the end of the 2013/14 season, and that Stuart Pearce would take over as manager on 1 July 2014. Fawaz has denied the reports that Warnock was offered the job, and that he interfered with football decisions. Al-Hasawi also received criticism for selling Karl Darlow and Jamaal Lascelles to Newcastle United without consulting Pearce.

Under Al-Hasawi, delays in pay to both staff and players became common, and during the 2015–16 season, Nottingham Forest were placed under a transfer embargo by the Football League, due to excessive losses. This forced new manager Dougie Freedman to only bring in players through free transfers and loans. Al-Hasawi would often summon Freedman to his home in London at midnight, leaving Freedman to be deprived of sleep for training the next day. Observers in the media expressed concern for Freedman's health. After Freedman had been sacked by Forest, Al-Haswai reportedly still called Freedman to try and ask him about potential transfers. Fawaz was accused of meddling in team selection while caretaker manager Paul Williams was in charge.

During the 2016–17 season, Al-Hasawi angered Forest fans by agreeing to sell popular academy graduate Oliver Burke to RB Leipzig, despite manager Philippe Montanier insisting that Burke should not leave the club. By now, Al-Hasawi had become an unpopular figure at the club, with many fans protesting against his ownership. Former Forest striker Stan Collymore joined Forest fans at a protest against Al-Hasawi after talks to sell the club to a U.S. consortium fell through.

Al-Hasawi had originally wanted to remain as Forest's chairman and retain twenty percent ownership of the club, but he was finally convinced that he would have to leave the club entirely. On 18 May 2017, Forest were sold to Greek shipping magnate Evangelos Marinakis, who is also the owner of Olympiacos. The announcement came only eleven days after Forest had avoided championship relegation on goal difference. Forest had declined in league position during every season that Al-Hasawi was in charge, going from 8th during the 2012–13 season, to 21st in the 2016–17 season.

The managers of Nottingham Forest during Fawaz's ownership were:

	Manager	Date appointed	Date left club	Notes
1	Steve Cotterill	Oct 14, 2011	Jul 12, 2012	Existing manager at takeover
2	Sean O'Driscoll	July 20, 2012	Dec 26, 2012	
3	Alex McLeish	Dec 27, 2012	Feb 5, 2013	
4	Billy Davies	Feb 7, 2013	Mar 24, 2014	
5	Stuart Pearce	Jul 1, 2014	Feb 1, 2015	
6	Dougie Freedman	Feb 1, 2015	Mar 13, 2016	
7	Paul Williams	Mar 13, 2016	May 12, 2016	
8	Philippe Montanier	Jun 27, 2016	Jan 14, 2017	
9	Mark Warburton	Mar 14, 2016		Manager when Al-Hasawi left

In June 2019, Forest were forced to deliver a legal letter to Al-Hasawi, demanding that he return Forest's replica FA Cup. Fawaz had removed the trophy from the club to display in his Mayfair home.

Business positions
Preceded by Omar Al-Hasawi	Nottingham Forest chairman 2012–2016	Incumbent
