= 2015–16 Nottingham Forest F.C. season =

English football club season

Nottingham Forest
2015–16 season
- Owner: Fawaz Al-Hasawi
- Chairman: Fawaz Al-Hasawi
- Manager: Dougie Freedman (until 13 March); Paul Williams (caretaker, 13 March to 13 May); Philippe Montanier (from 27 June)
- Stadium: City Ground
- Championship: 16th
- FA Cup: Fourth round
- League Cup: First round
- Top goalscorer: League: Nélson Oliveira (9); All: Nélson Oliveira (9)
- Highest home attendance: 27,551 (vs. Leeds United, Football League Championship, 27 December)
- Lowest home attendance: 5,237 (vs. Walsall, Football League Cup first round, 11 August)
Home colours	Away colours	Third colours

The 2015–16 season was Nottingham Forest's 150th season in existence and 8th consecutive season in the Championship since promotion in 2007–08. The club also participated in the FA Cup and the Football League Cup. On the 13 March 2016, manager Dougie Freedman was sacked after Forest lost five of his final six games in charge. Freedman was replaced by first team coach Paul Williams, who was appointed for the remainder of the season. The season covers the period from 1 July 2015 to 30 June 2016.

== First team squad ==
As of 30 April 2016

No.	Player	Nationality	Date of birth (age)	Previous club	Joined first team	Player contracted until
Goalkeepers
1	Dorus de Vries	NED	29 December 1980 (aged 35)	Wolverhampton Wanderers	2013	2017
26	Dimitar Evtimov	BUL	7 September 1993 (aged 22)	Chavdar Etropole	2011	2019
Defenders
2	Eric Lichaj	USA	17 November 1988 (aged 27)	Aston Villa	2013	2018
3	Bojan Jokić	SVN	17 May 1986 (aged 30)	Villarreal	2016	2016
4	Michael Mancienne	ENG	8 January 1988 (aged 28)	Hamburger SV	2014	2017
5	Matt Mills	ENG	14 July 1986 (aged 29)	Bolton Wanderers	2015	2018
6	Kelvin Wilson	ENG	3 September 1985 (aged 30)	Celtic	2013	2016
13	Danny Fox	SCO	29 May 1986 (aged 30)	Southampton	2014	2017
25	Jack Hobbs	ENG	18 August 1988 (aged 27)	Hull City	2014	2018
31	Daniel Pinillos	ESP	22 October 1992 (aged 23)	Córdoba	2015	2017
Midfielders
8	Chris Cohen	ENG	5 March 1987 (aged 29)	Yeovil Town	2007	2017
10	Henri Lansbury	ENG	12 October 1990 (aged 25)	Arsenal	2012	2017
11	Andy Reid	IRL	29 July 1982 (aged 33)	Blackpool	2011	2016
15	Ryan Mendes	CPV	8 January 1990 (aged 26)	Lille	2015	2016
22	Gary Gardner	ENG	29 June 1992 (aged 24)	Aston Villa	2015	2016
24	David Vaughan	WAL	18 February 1983 (aged 33)	Sunderland	2014	2017
32	Robert Tesche	GER	27 May 1987 (aged 29)	Hamburger SV	2014	2016
35	Oliver Burke	SCO	7 April 1997 (aged 19)	Academy	2015	2020
37	Jorge Grant	ENG	26 September 1994 (aged 21)	Academy	2013	2017
38	Ben Osborn	ENG	5 August 1994 (aged 21)	Academy	2012	2019
Forwards
7	Matty Fryatt	ENG	5 March 1986 (aged 30)	Hull City	2014	2017
9	Britt Assombalonga	COD	6 December 1992 (aged 23)	Peterborough United	2014	2019
17	Nélson Oliveira	POR	8 August 1991 (aged 24)	Benfica	2015	2016
18	Federico Macheda	ITA	22 August 1991 (aged 24)	Cardiff City	2016	2016
19	Jamie Ward	NIR	12 May 1986 (aged 30)	Derby County	2015	2019
23	Dexter Blackstock	ATG	20 May 1986 (aged 30)	Queens Park Rangers	2009	2017
29	Chris O'Grady	ENG	25 January 1986 (aged 30)	Brighton & Hove Albion	2015	2016

=== New contracts ===
Date	Position	Nationality	Player	Length of contract	Player contracted until	Reference
29 July 2015	GK	BUL	Dimitar Evtimov	4 Years	2019	
4 January 2016	DF	SCO	Jordan Gabriel	Undisclosed	Undisclosed	
17 February 2016	MF	ENG	Chris Cohen	1 Year	2017	
17 February 2016	MF	SCO	Oliver Burke	4.5 Years	2020	
11 March 2016	MF	WAL	David Vaughan	1 Year	2017	
12 March 2016	DF	USA	Eric Lichaj	1 Year	2018	

== Player transfers ==
(Note: Please note that this section includes players in or out from date commencing 10 June 2015; the date that the UK Summer transfer window opened.)

=== Transfers in ===
First team
Date	Position	Nationality	Name	From	Transfer Fee	Reference
1 July 2015	DF	ENG	Matt Mills	Free agent	Free transfer	
2 July 2015	MF	NIR	Jamie Ward	Free agent	Free transfer	
30 July 2015	DF	ESP	Daniel Pinillos	Free agent	Free transfer	

Academy
Date	Position	Nationality	Name	From	Transfer Fee	Reference
14 January 2016	MF	SWE	Anel Ahmedhodžić	Malmö	Undisclosed	

=== Loans in ===
Date	Position	Nationality	Name	From	Loan Expired	Reference
20 August 2015	MF	NED	Kyle Ebecilio	Twente	1 February 2016 (Note: Ebecilio's loan was originally agreed to expire on 30 June 2016, but his loan was terminated early by mutual consent.)	
1 September 2015	ST	ENG	Chris O'Grady	Brighton & Hove Albion	30 June 2016	
4 September 2015	MF	CPV	Ryan Mendes	Lille	30 June 2016	
4 September 2015	ST	POR	Nélson Oliveira	Benfica	30 June 2016	
10 September 2015	MF	WAL	Jonny Williams	Crystal Palace	16 January 2016	
24 October 2015	MF	ENG	Liam Trotter	Bolton Wanderers	4 January 2016	
8 January 2016	DF	SVN	Bojan Jokić	Villarreal	30 June 2016	
8 January 2016	MF	ENG	Gary Gardner	Aston Villa	30 June 2016	
15 March 2016	ST	ITA	Federico Macheda	Cardiff City	30 June 2016	

=== Transfers out ===
First team
Date	Position	Nationality	Name	To	Transfer Fee	Reference
16 June 2015	ST	SCO	Jamie Mackie	Queens Park Rangers	Free transfer	
1 July 2015	DF	WAL	Danny Collins	Free agent (Later joined Rotherham United)	Released	
1 July 2015	DF	ENG	Greg Halford	Free agent (Later joined Rotherham United)	Released	
1 July 2015	DF	ENG	Dan Harding	Free agent (Later joined Eastleigh)	Released	
1 July 2015	DF	ENG	Louis Laing	Free agent (Later joined Motherwell)	Released	
30 July 2015	MF	ALG	Djamel Abdoun	Free agent (Later joined Veria)	Contract Terminated	
30 July 2015	MF	POL	Radosław Majewski	Free agent (Later joined Veria)	Contract Terminated	
27 August 2015	MF	IRE	Stephen McLaughlin	Southend United	Undisclosed	
1 September 2015	MF	ENG	Michail Antonio	West Ham United	Undisclosed (Note: Reported by the BBC to be £7,000,000.)	

Academy
Date	Position	Nationality	Name	To	Transfer Fee	Reference
1 July 2015	MF	SCO	Jack Blake	Free agent (Later joined Minnesota United)	Released	
1 July 2015	DF	ENG	Kieran Fenton	Free agent (Later joined Worksop Town)	Released	
1 July 2015	ST	CIV	Wilfried Gnahoré	Free agent (Later joined Hemel Hempstead Town)	Released	
1 July 2015	ST	AUS	Josh Macdonald	Free agent (Later joined Western Sydney Wanderers)	Released	
1 July 2015	GK	IRE	Aaron Myles	Free agent (Later joined Tolka Rovers)	Released	
1 July 2015	ST	ENG	Derrick Otim	Free agent (Later joined Xavier Musketeers)	Released	
1 July 2015	MF	GRE	Ilias Polimos	Free agent (Later joined Panthrakikos)	Released	
1 July 2015	MF	CMR	Edouard Schoenecker	Free agent (Later joined Carlton Town)	Released	
21 January 2016	DF	ESP	Roger Riera	Celta Vigo B	Contract Terminated	
23 May 2016	GK	ENG	Ross Durant	Ilkeston	Released	
1 June 2016	DF	CYP	Andreas Karo	Apollon Limassol	Released	

=== Loans out ===
Date	Position	Nationality	Name	To	Loan Expired	Reference
1 July 2015	ST	NED	Lars Veldwijk	Zwolle	30 June 2016	
1 September 2015	ST	ENG	Jamie Paterson	Huddersfield Town	30 June 2016	
22 January 2016	MF	SCO	Chris Burke	Rotherham United	30 June 2016	
23 January 2016	MF	LIT	Deimantas Petravičius	Stevenage	21 February 2016	
22 February 2016	DF	ENG	Jack Kelly	Hemel Hempstead Town	20 March 2016	
24 March 2016	ST	ENG	Tyler Walker	Burton Albion	30 June 2016	

== Pre-season friendlies ==
On 3 June 2015 Nottingham Forest confirmed their pre-season friendlies and plans for a tour of Sweden.

8 July 2015 Friendly	OB	4–2	Nottingham Forest	Trelleborg
19:00 CEST	Zohore 38' (pen.) 65'; Festersen 63'; Greve 83'	Report	20' Blackstock; 74' Paterson	Stadium: Vångavallen

12 July 2015 Friendly	Mjällby AIF	1–1	Nottingham Forest	Hällevik
18:00 CEST	Fadi 10'	Report	81' C. Burke	Stadium: Strandvallen; Attendance: 1,026

14 July 2015 Friendly	FC Helsingør	2–1	Nottingham Forest	Helsingør
19:00 CEST	Koch 1'; Olsen 64'	Report	88' Walker	Stadium: Helsingør Stadion; Attendance: 747

17 July 2015 Friendly	Stevenage	0–3	Nottingham Forest	Stevenage
19:30 BST		Report	13' Mills; 20' (pen.) Lansbury; 88' Hobbs	Stadium: The Lamex Stadium; Referee: Andy Woolmer

21 July 2015 Friendly	Doncaster Rovers	1–1	Nottingham Forest	Doncaster
19:45 BST	Main 16'	Report	34' C. Burke	Stadium: Keepmoat Stadium; Attendance: 2,613; Referee: Darren England

25 July 2015 Friendly	Nottingham Forest	1–1	Swansea City	West Bridgford
15:00 BST	Tesche 68'	Report	60' Ayew	Stadium: The City Ground; Attendance: 4,285; Referee: Chris Kavanagh

1 August 2015 Friendly	Nottingham Forest	3–3	Aston Villa	West Bridgford
15:00 BST	Blackstock 1'; Lansbury 81'; Wilson 90'	Report	22' 52' 64' Sinclair	Stadium: The City Ground; Attendance: 10,625; Referee: Steve Martin

== Competitions ==
=== Championship ===
==== League table ====
Pos	Team	Pld	W	D	L	GF	GA	GD	Pts
14	Wolverhampton Wanderers	46	14	16	16	53	58	−5	58
15	Blackburn Rovers	46	13	16	17	46	46	0	55
16	Nottingham Forest	46	13	16	17	43	47	−4	55
17	Reading	46	13	13	20	52	59	−7	52
18	Bristol City	46	13	13	20	54	71	−17	52

Source: BBC Sport
Rules for classification: 1) Points; 2) Goal difference; 3) Number of goals scored

==== Results summary ====
Overall								Home						Away					
Pld	W	D	L	GF	GA	GD	Pts	W	D	L	GF	GA	GD	W	D	L	GF	GA	GD
46	13	16	17	43	47	−4	55	7	8	8	25	26	−1	6	8	9	18	21	−3

Last updated: 8 May 2016.
Source: Nottingham Forest

==== Results by matchday ====
Round	1	2	3	4	5	6	7	8	9	10	11	12	13	14	15	16	17	18	19	20	21	22	23	24	25	26	27	28	29	30	31	32	33	34	35	36	37	38	39	40	41	42	43	44	45	46
Ground	A	H	H	A	H	A	A	H	A	H	A	H	H	A	A	H	A	H	H	A	A	H	H	A	A	H	H	A	H	A	H	A	H	A	H	H	A	A	H	A	H	A	H	A	H	A
Result	L	W	D	D	L	W	W	L	D	L	L	D	D	L	L	W	L	W	W	D	D	W	D	D	D	D	W	W	D	W	L	L	L	L	W	L	D	L	L	L	L	D	D	W	D	W
Position	24	12	11	11	16	11	8	9	10	13	14	15	16	17	19	18	18	16	15	15	15	13	15	14	14	14	12	11	11	10	10	12	15	15	13	14	14	15	16	17	20	19	18	17	17	16

Updated to match(es) played on 30 April 2016. Source: Nottingham Forest
A = Away; H = Home; W = Win; D = Draw; L = Loss

==== Matches ====
On 17 June 2015, the fixtures for the forthcoming season were announced.

7 August 2015 1	Brighton & Hove Albion	1–0	Nottingham Forest	Falmer
19:45 BST	LuaLua 50'	Report		Stadium: Falmer Stadium; Attendance: 24,623; Referee: Keith Stroud

15 August 2015 2	Nottingham Forest	2–1	Rotherham United	West Bridgford
15:00 BST	Mills 45'; Antonio 61'	Report	13' Collins	Stadium: The City Ground; Attendance: 19,885; Referee: Darren Bond

18 August 2015 3	Nottingham Forest	0–0	Charlton Athletic	West Bridgford
19:45 BST		Report		Stadium: The City Ground; Attendance: 17,801; Referee: Darren Drysdale

22 August 2015 4	Bolton Wanderers	1–1	Nottingham Forest	Horwich
15:00 BST	Dobbie 90'	Report	81' Vaughan	Stadium: Macron Stadium; Attendance: 16,410; Referee: Carl Boyeson

29 August 2015 5	Nottingham Forest	1–2	Cardiff City	West Bridgford
15:00 BST	Antonio 86'	Report	23' Jones; 49' Mason	Stadium: The City Ground; Attendance: 18,762; Referee: Oliver Langford

12 September 2015 6	QPR	1–2	Nottingham Forest	Hammersmith and Fulham
12:30 BST	Austin 66'; Green (red card) 72'	Report	75' (pen.) Lansbury; 82' Oliveira	Stadium: Loftus Road; Attendance: 15,424; Referee: Keith Hill

15 September 2015 7	Birmingham City	0–1	Nottingham Forest	Birmingham
19:45 BST		Report	54' Blackstock	Stadium: St Andrew's; Attendance: 16,609; Referee: Mark Heywood

19 September 2015 8	Nottingham Forest	1–2	Middlesbrough	West Bridgford
12:30 BST	Mills 7'	Report	3' Nugent; 32' Ayala	Stadium: The City Ground; Attendance: 20,993; Referee: Lee Mason

24 September 2015 9	Huddersfield Town	1–1	Nottingham Forest	Huddersfield
19:45 BST	Huws 84'	Report	23' Mendes	Stadium: John Smith's Stadium; Attendance: 11,299; Referee: Graham Salisbury

3 October 2015 10	Nottingham Forest	0–1	Hull City	West Bridgford
15:00 BST	Mills (red card) 87'	Report	41' Hernández	Stadium: The City Ground; Attendance: 20,985; Referee: Nigel Miller

16 October 2015 11	Bristol City	2–0	Nottingham Forest	Bristol
19:45 BST	Wilbraham 4' 11'	Report		Stadium: Ashton Gate Stadium; Attendance: 15,285; Referee: Lee Mason

20 October 2015 12	Nottingham Forest	1–1	Burnley	West Bridgford
19:45 BST	Lichaj 73'; Lansbury (red card) 75'	Report	90' Taylor	Stadium: The City Ground; Attendance: 17,721; Referee: Stuart Attwell

24 October 2015 13	Nottingham Forest	1–1	Ipswich Town	West Bridgford
15:00 BST	Trotter 90'	Report	75' Parr	Stadium: The City Ground; Attendance: 19,616; Referee: Paul Tierney

31 October 2015 14	Sheffield Wednesday	1–0	Nottingham Forest	Sheffield
15:00 BST	Forestieri 68'	Report		Stadium: Hillsborough Stadium; Attendance: 22,465; Referee: Jeremy Simpson

3 November 2015 15	Preston North End	1–0	Nottingham Forest	Preston
19:45 BST	Doyle 2'	Report		Stadium: Deepdale; Attendance: 10,216; Referee: Tony Harrington

6 November 2015 16	Nottingham Forest	1–0	Derby County	West Bridgford
19:30 BST	Oliveira 5'	Report		Stadium: The City Ground; Attendance: 25,114; Referee: Simon Hooper

21 November 2015 17	Brentford	2–1	Nottingham Forest	Hounslow
15:00 BST	Canós 63'; Dean (red card) 71'; Hofmann 90'	Report	74' Lansbury	Stadium: Griffin Park; Attendance: 11,403; Referee: Brendan Malone

28 November 2015 18	Nottingham Forest	3–1	Reading	West Bridgford
15:00 BST	O'Grady 20'; Oliveira 31' 49'; Hobbs (yellow card) 42' (yellow-red card) 64'	Report	14' Vydra	Stadium: The City Ground; Attendance: 18,128; Referee: Keith Hill

5 December 2015 19	Nottingham Forest	3–0	Fulham	West Bridgford
15:00 BST	Mills 45' 78'; O'Grady 52'	Report		Stadium: The City Ground; Attendance: 18,377; Referee: Carl Boyeson

11 December 2015 20	Wolverhampton Wanderers	1–1	Nottingham Forest	Wolverhampton
19:45 BST	Ebanks-Landell 15'	Report	80' Blackstock	Stadium: Molineux Stadium; Attendance: 20,000; Referee: Keith Stroud

14 December 2015 21	Blackburn Rovers	0–0	Nottingham Forest	Blackburn
19:45 BST		Report		Stadium: Ewood Park; Attendance: 12,002; Referee: Chris Kavanagh

19 December 2015 22	Nottingham Forest	2–1	MK Dons	West Bridgford
15:00 BST	Oliveira 2'; Mendes 16'	Report	81' Murphy	Stadium: The City Ground; Attendance: 19,975; Referee: Simon Hooper

27 December 2015 23	Nottingham Forest	1–1	Leeds United	West Bridgford
16:00 BST	Oliveira 17'	Report	80' Byram	Stadium: The City Ground; Attendance: 27,551; Referee: James Linington

29 December 2015 24	Cardiff City	1–1	Nottingham Forest	Cardiff
19:45 BST	Gunnarsson 13'	Report	9' O. Burke	Stadium: Cardiff City Stadium; Attendance: 15,461; Referee: Tim Robinson

2 January 2016 25	Charlton Athletic	1–1	Nottingham Forest	Greenwich
15:00 BST	Makienok 70'	Report	44' Osborn	Stadium: The Valley; Attendance: 16,090; Referee: Trevor Kettle

12 January 2016 26	Nottingham Forest	1–1	Birmingham City	West Bridgford
19:45 BST	Mills 30'; Vaughan (red card) 74'	Report	24' Toral	Stadium: The City Ground; Attendance: 18,342; Referee: Mark Brown

16 January 2016 27	Nottingham Forest	3–0	Bolton Wanderers	West Bridgford
15:00 BST	Oliveira 12' (pen.); O. Burke 16'; Ward 83'	Report	(red card) 12' Amos	Stadium: The City Ground; Attendance: 18,465; Referee: Eddie Ilderton

23 January 2016 28	Middlesbrough	0–1	Nottingham Forest	Middlesbrough
15:00 BST		Report	70' Ward	Stadium: Riverside Stadium; Attendance: 24,975; Referee: Fred Graham

26 January 2016 29	Nottingham Forest	0–0	QPR	West Bridgford
19:45 BST		Report		Stadium: The City Ground; Attendance: 17,030; Referee: Paul Tierney

6 February 2016 30	Leeds United	0–1	Nottingham Forest	Leeds
15:00 BST		Report	60' Oliveira	Stadium: Elland Road; Attendance: 24,079; Referee: Scott Duncan

13 February 2016 31	Nottingham Forest	0–2	Huddersfield Town	West Bridgford
15:00 BST		Report	14' (o.g.) Mills; 84' Billing	Stadium: The City Ground; Attendance: 19,984; Referee: Darren Deadman

23 February 2016 32	Burnley	1–0	Nottingham Forest	Burnley
19:45 BST	Vokes 68'	Report		Stadium: Turf Moor; Attendance: 15,517; Referee: Andrew Madley

27 February 2016 33	Nottingham Forest	1–2	Bristol City	West Bridgford
19:45 BST	Osborn 30'	Report	41' Kodjia; 70' Flint	Stadium: The City Ground; Attendance: 20,551; Referee: David Webb

5 March 2016 34	Ipswich Town	1–0	Nottingham Forest	Ipswich
15:00 BST	Pringle 63'	Report		Stadium: Portman Road; Attendance: 20,658; Referee: Andy Woolmer

8 March 2016 35	Nottingham Forest	1–0	Preston North End	West Bridgford
19:45 BST	Oliveira 37'	Report		Stadium: The City Ground; Attendance: 16,747; Referee: Mark Brown

12 March 2016 36	Nottingham Forest	0–3	Sheffield Wednesday	West Bridgford
15:00 BST		Report	30' McGeady; 62' Hooper; (red card) 77' Bannan; 85' Matias	Stadium: The City Ground; Attendance: 20,690; Referee: Graham Scott

15 March 2016 37	Hull City	1–1	Nottingham Forest	Kingston upon Hull
19:45 BST	Aluko 73'	Report	28' Gardner	Stadium: KC Stadium; Attendance: 15,663; Referee: Andy Davies

19 March 2016 38	Derby County	1–0	Nottingham Forest	Derby
12:30 BST	Olsson 79'	Report		Stadium: iPro Stadium; Attendance: 33,010; Referee: Keith Stroud

2 April 2016 39	Nottingham Forest	0–3	Brentford	West Bridgford
15:00 BST	Lichaj (yellow card) 77' (yellow-red card)	Report	49' Vibe; 65' Yennaris; 87' Canós	Stadium: The City Ground; Attendance: 19,444; Referee: Peter Bankes

5 April 2016 40	Reading	2–1	Nottingham Forest	Reading
20:00 BST	Vydra 68'; Norwood 81'	Report	41' Osborn	Stadium: Madejski Stadium; Attendance: 15,678; Referee: Dean Whitestone

11 April 2016 41	Nottingham Forest	1–2	Brighton & Hove Albion	West Bridgford
19:45 BST	Blackstock 50'	Report	27' Dunk; 90' Sidwell	Stadium: The City Ground; Attendance: 17,642; Referee: Andy Davies

16 April 2016 42	Rotherham United	0–0	Nottingham Forest	Rotherham
15:00 BST		Report		Stadium: AESSEAL New York Stadium; Attendance: 11,503; Referee: Simon Hooper

19 April 2016 43	Nottingham Forest	1–1	Blackburn Rovers	West Bridgford
19:45 GMT	Blackstock 15'	Report	22' Graham	Stadium: The City Ground; Attendance: 16,449; Referee: Chris Kavanagh

23 April 2016 44	Fulham	1–3	Nottingham Forest	Hammersmith and Fulham
15:00 GMT	Smith 62'	Report	23' Tesche; 44' (pen.) 70' Lansbury	Stadium: Craven Cottage; Attendance: 18,253; Referee: Rob Lewis

30 April 2016 45	Nottingham Forest	1–1	Wolverhampton Wanderers	West Bridgford
15:00 GMT	Gardner 68'	Report	58' Mason	Stadium: The City Ground; Attendance: 22,291; Referee: Iain Williamson

7 May 2016 46	MK Dons	1–2	Nottingham Forest	Milton Keynes
12:30 GMT	Maynard 19'	Report	8' Cohen; (red card) 37' Fox; 74' Assombalonga	Stadium: Stadium mk Attendance: 15,486; Referee: Steve Martin

=== FA Cup ===
9 January 2016 Third round	Nottingham Forest	1–0	QPR	West Bridgford
15:00 BST	Ward 23'	Report		Stadium: The City Ground; Attendance: 14,197; Referee: Oliver Langford

30 January 2016 Fourth round	Nottingham Forest	0–1	Watford	West Bridgford
15:00 BST		Report	89' Ighalo	Stadium: The City Ground; Attendance: 24,703; Referee: Neil Swarbrick

=== Football League Cup ===
11 August 2015 First round	Nottingham Forest	3–4	Walsall	West Bridgford
19:45 BST	Walker 32'; Antonio 81' 90'	Report	11' 14' 90' (pen.) Bradshaw; 79' Sawyers	Stadium: The City Ground; Attendance: 5,237; Referee: Darren Handley

== Squad statistics ==
=== Appearances and goals ===
As of 9 May 2016 (Note: Players whose names are in italics spent time on loan at other clubs during the course of the season.) (Note: Players whose names appear emboldened left the club on a permanent basis having appeared in a competitive fixture this season.)

No.	Pos	Nat	Player	Total		Championship		FA Cup		League Cup	
No.	Pos	Nat	Player	Apps	Goals	Apps	Goals	Apps	Goals	Apps	Goals
1	GK	(Netherlands) NED	Dorus de Vries	48	0	45	0	2	0	1	0
2	DF	(United States) USA	Eric Lichaj	46	1	43	1	1+1	0	1	0
3	DF	(Slovenia) SLO	Bojan Jokić	21	0	19+1	0	0+1	0	0	0
4	DF	(England) ENG	Michael Mancienne	33	0	29+2	0	1	0	1	0
5	DF	(England) ENG	Matt Mills	42	5	42	5	0	0	0	0
6	DF	(England) ENG	Kelvin Wilson	17	0	11+3	0	2	0	1	0
7	ST	(England) ENG	Matty Fryatt (Note: An injury to Fryatt's Achilles tendon, sustained in March 2015, prevented him from playing this season.)	0	0	0	0	0	0	0	0
8	MF	(England) ENG	Chris Cohen	17	1	11+4	1	2	0	0	0
9	ST	(Democratic Republic of the Congo) COD	Britt Assombalonga	4	1	0+4	1	0	0	0	0
10	MF	(England) ENG	Henri Lansbury	29	4	26+2	4	0+1	0	0	0
11	MF	(Republic of Ireland) IRL	Andy Reid (Note: An injury to Reid's groin, sustained in October 2014, prevented him from playing this season.)	0	0	0	0	0	0	0	0
13	DF	(Scotland) SCO	Danny Fox	11	0	8+2	0	0	0	1	0
14	MF	(Netherlands) NED	Kyle Ebecilio	5	0	3+2	0	0	0	0	0
14	ST	(Netherlands) NED	Lars Veldwijk	0	0	0	0	0	0	0	0
15	MF	(Cape Verde) CPV	Ryan Mendes	32	2	26+6	2	0	0	0	0
17	ST	(Portugal) POR	Nélson Oliveira	29	9	24+4	9	0+1	0	0	0
18	MF	(England) ENG	Michail Antonio	5	4	4	2	0	0	0+1	2
18	ST	(Italy) ITA	Federico Macheda	3	0	3	0	0	0	0	0
18	MF	(England) ENG	Liam Trotter	9	1	5+4	1	0	0	0	0
19	MF	(Northern Ireland) NIR	Jamie Ward	34	3	20+11	2	2	1	1	0
20	MF	(Wales) WAL	Jonny Williams	10	0	4+6	0	0	0	0	0
21	ST	(England) ENG	Jamie Paterson	2	0	0+1	0	0	0	1	0
22	MF	(England) ENG	Gary Gardner	22	2	18+2	2	2	0	0	0
23	ST	(Antigua and Barbuda) ANT	Dexter Blackstock	32	4	12+17	4	2	0	0+1	0
24	MF	(Wales) WAL	David Vaughan	37	1	31+4	1	1	0	1	0
25	DF	(England) ENG	Jack Hobbs	23	0	18+2	0	2	0	1	0
26	GK	(Bulgaria) BUL	Dimitar Evtimov	1	0	1	0	0	0	0	0
27	MF	(Scotland) SCO	Chris Burke	10	0	7+2	0	0	0	1	0
29	ST	(England) ENG	Chris O'Grady	21	2	15+6	2	0	0	0	0
31	DF	(Spain) ESP	Daniel Pinillos	19	0	19	0	0	0	0	0
32	MF	(Germany) GER	Robert Tesche	25	1	17+7	1	1	0	0	0
34	ST	(England) ENG	Tyler Walker	15	1	5+9	0	0	0	1	1
35	MF	(Scotland) SCO	Oliver Burke	21	2	6+12	2	2	0	0+1	0
37	MF	(England) ENG	Jorge Grant	11	0	2+8	0	1	0	0	0
38	MF	(England) ENG	Ben Osborn	38	3	32+4	3	1+1	0	0	0
39	ST	(Bulgaria) BUL	Nikolay Todorov	0	0	0	0	0	0	0	0
40	DF	(Scotland) SCO	Alex Iacovitti	0	0	0	0	0	0	0	0
41	ST	(Ireland) EIR	Gerry McDonagh	1	0	0+1	0	0	0	0	0
42	DF	(England) ENG	Joe Worrall	0	0	0	0	0	0	0	0
43	GK	(England) ENG	Ross Durrant	0	0	0	0	0	0	0	0
44	MF	(Lithuania) LTU	Deimantas Petravičius	1	0	0+1	0	0	0	0	0
45	FW	(England) ENG	Ben Brereton	0	0	0	0	0	0	0	0
46	DF	(Scotland) SCO	Jordan Gabriel	0	0	0	0	0	0	0	0
47	MF	(England) ENG	Toby Edser	0	0	0	0	0	0	0	0
48	GK	(England) ENG	Jordan Wright	0	0	0	0	0	0	0	0

Source: Nottingham Forest F.C.

=== Goal scorers ===
As of 9 May 2016

Rank	No.	Position	Player	Championship	FA Cup	League Cup	Total
1	17	Striker	Nélson Oliveira	9	0	0	9
2	5	Defender	Matt Mills	5	0	0	5
3	10	Midfielder	Henri Lansbury	4	0	0	4
3	18	Midfielder	Michail Antonio	2	0	2	4
3	23	Striker	Dexter Blackstock	4	0	0	4
4	19	Midfielder	Jamie Ward	2	1	0	3
4	38	Midfielder	Ben Osborn	3	0	0	3
5	15	Midfielder	Ryan Mendes	2	0	0	2
5	22	Midfielder	Gary Gardner	2	0	0	2
5	29	Striker	Chris O'Grady	2	0	0	2
5	35	Midfielder	Oliver Burke	2	0	0	2
6	2	Defender	Eric Lichaj	1	0	0	1
6	8	Midfielder	Chris Cohen	1	0	0	1
6	9	Striker	Britt Assombalonga	1	0	0	1
6	18	Midfielder	Liam Trotter	1	0	0	1
6	24	Midfielder	David Vaughan	1	0	0	1
6	32	Midfielder	Robert Tesche	1	0	0	1
6	34	Striker	Tyler Walker	0	0	1	1
TOTAL				43	1	3	47

Source: Nottingham Forest F.C.

=== Disciplinary record ===
As of 9 May 2016

No.	Position	Player	Championship		FA Cup		League Cup		Total	
No.	Position	Player	Booked	Sent off (straight red)	Booked	Sent off (straight red)	Booked	Sent off (straight red)	Booked	Sent off (straight red)
2	Defender	Eric Lichaj	11	1	1	0	0	0	12	1
5	Defender	Matt Mills	11	1	0	0	0	0	11	1
24	Midfielder	David Vaughan	9	1	0	0	0	0	9	1
4	Defender	Michael Mancienne	6	0	0	0	1	0	7	0
15	Midfielder	Ryan Mendes	7	0	0	0	0	0	7	0
10	Midfielder	Henri Lansbury	5	1	0	0	0	0	5	1
17	Striker	Nélson Oliveira	5	0	0	0	0	0	5	0
19	Midfielder	Jamie Ward	4	0	1	0	0	0	5	0
23	Striker	Dexter Blackstock	5	0	0	0	0	0	5	0
25	Defender	Jack Hobbs	2	1	0	0	1	0	3	1
3	Defender	Bojan Jokić	3	0	0	0	0	0	3	0
22	Midfielder	Gary Gardner	3	0	0	0	0	0	3	0
32	Midfielder	Robert Tesche	3	0	0	0	0	0	3	0
38	Midfielder	Ben Osborn	3	0	0	0	0	0	3	0
1	Goalkeeper	Dorus de Vries	2	0	0	0	0	0	2	0
37	Midfielder	Jorge Grant	2	0	0	0	0	0	2	0
13	Defender	Danny Fox	1	1	0	0	0	0	1	1
6	Defender	Kelvin Wilson	1	0	0	0	0	0	1	0
8	Midfielder	Chris Cohen	1	0	0	0	0	0	1	0
9	Striker	Britt Assombalonga	1	0	0	0	0	0	1	0
20	Midfielder	Jonny Williams	1	0	0	0	0	0	1	0
27	Midfielder	Chris Burke	1	0	0	0	0	0	1	0
29	Striker	Chris O'Grady	1	0	0	0	0	0	1	0
34	Striker	Tyler Walker	1	0	0	0	0	0	1	0
TOTAL			89	6	2	0	2	0	93	6

Source: Nottingham Forest F.C.
