= Matt Mills =

English footballer (born 1986)

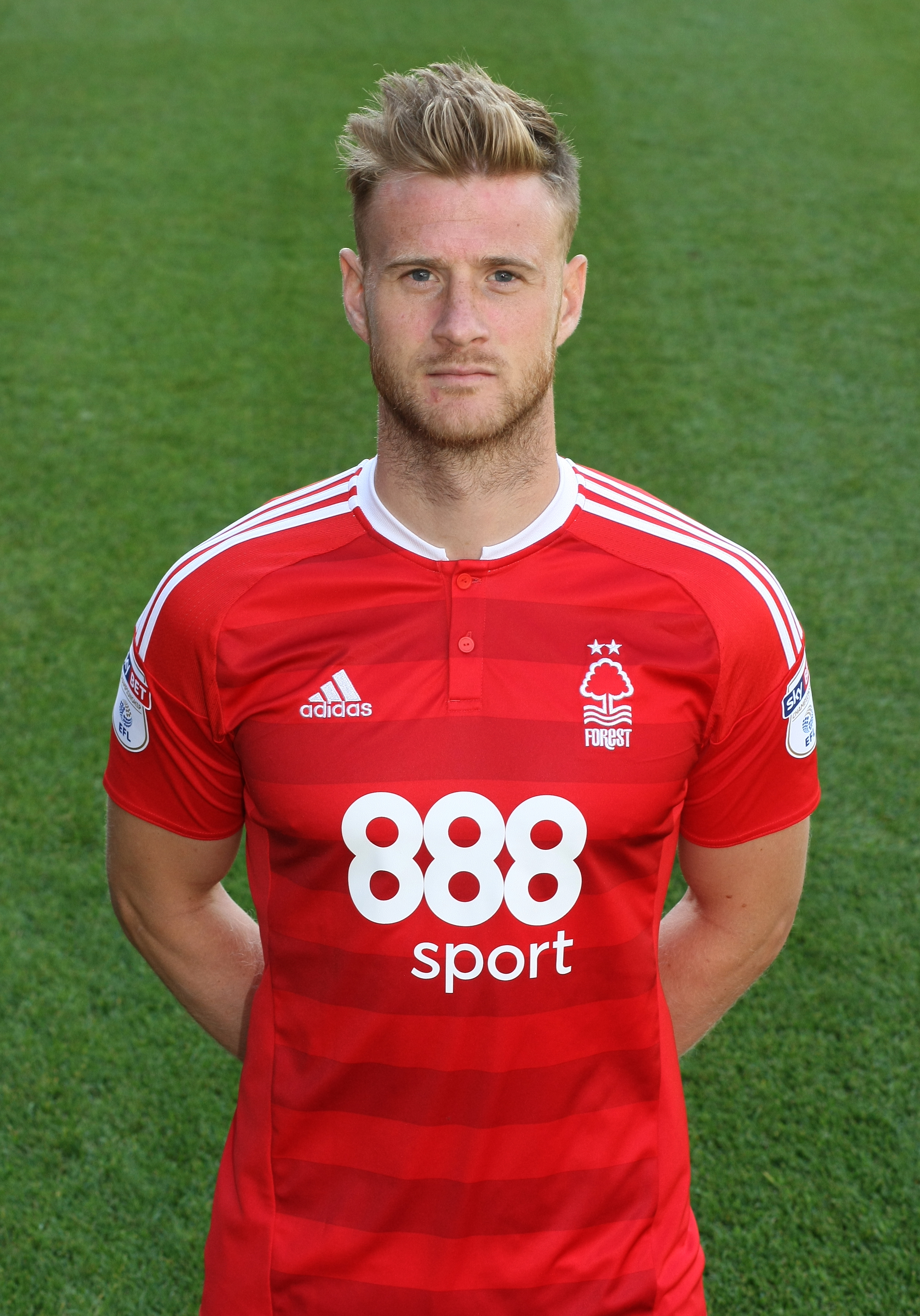
- Mills with Nottingham Forest in 2016

Personal information
- Full name: Matthew Claude Mills
- Date of birth: 14 July 1986 (age 40)
- Place of birth: Swindon, England
- Height: 6 ft 3 in (1.91 m)
- Position: Centre-back

Youth career
- –1999: Swindon Town
- 1999–2003: Southampton

Senior career*
Years	Team	Apps	(Gls)
2003–2006	Southampton	4	(0)
2004	→ Coventry City (loan)	4	(0)
2005	→ AFC Bournemouth (loan)	12	(3)
2006–2008	Manchester City	2	(0)
2007	→ Colchester United (loan)	9	(0)
2007	→ Doncaster Rovers (loan)	14	(2)
2008	→ Doncaster Rovers (loan)	20	(1)
2008–2009	Doncaster Rovers	41	(0)
2009–2011	Reading	61	(4)
2011–2012	Leicester City	25	(1)
2012–2015	Bolton Wanderers	87	(6)
2015–2018	Nottingham Forest	82	(6)
2018	Barnsley	4	(0)
2018–2019	Pune City	15	(1)
2019–2020	Forest Green Rovers	19	(0)
Total		399	(24)

International career
2004–2005	England U19	8	(0)
- * Club domestic league appearances and goals

Matthew Claude Mills (born 14 July 1986) is an English former professional footballer who played as a defender. He spent the majority of his career in the English Football League Championship, representing Leicester City, Reading, Bolton, Nottingham Forest, Doncaster Rovers, and Barnsley. He retired from professional football in 2020.

Born in Swindon, Mills began his youth career with the academy of Swindon Town before joining the Southampton Academy in 1999. He turned professional in 2002 and had loan spells with Coventry City and AFC Bournemouth during his time at Southampton. In 2006, he signed for Manchester City; however, his playing opportunities were limited due to injuries.

Following loan moves to Colchester United and Doncaster Rovers, he joined the latter on a permanent basis in 2008. After one season, Mills signed for Reading for a fee believed to be around £2 million. In May 2011, he captained Reading in the Championship play-off final defeat against Swansea City, in which he also scored. Later that year, after turning down an offer from Wolverhampton Wanderers, Mills signed for Leicester City and was appointed club captain. In 2012, he moved to Bolton Wanderers, where he finished third in the voting for the club's Player of the Season award for 2014–15. He subsequently joined Nottingham Forest in 2015.

After three seasons at Forest, Mills went on to play for Barnsley, Pune City, and Forest Green Rovers before announcing his retirement from professional football.

Mills was capped at youth level for England, making eight appearances for the under-19 team. His younger brother, Joseph Mills, has also played for Forest Green Rovers. In February 2009, football pundit and former Leicester City player Steve Claridge described Mills as "an old-fashioned centre-half who relishes the physical side of the game".

== Club career ==
=== Southampton ===
Born in Swindon, Wiltshire, Mills began his youth career at Swindon Town in 1999 before joining Southampton at the age of fourteen. Having progressed through the Southampton Academy and then the reserves, he signed his first professional contract with the club in 2002.

In order to gain first-team experience, Mills was loaned to Coventry City for one month on 18 September 2004. On the same day, he made his debut for Coventry City, just hours after completing the necessary paperwork, in a 0–0 draw against Rotherham United. He made three further starts, including scoring an own goal in a 2–1 defeat to Ipswich Town on 3 October 2004, which proved to be his final appearance for the club. Mills then returned to Southampton, making four appearances. Although Coventry City sought to extend his loan for a second month, Southampton declined the request.

On 21 February 2005, Mills joined AFC Bournemouth on a one-month loan. He made his Bournemouth debut the following day, starting and playing the full 90 minutes in a 1–1 draw against Torquay United. He subsequently scored his first goals for the club, against Tranmere Rovers and Swindon Town. His performances led to his loan being extended twice, eventually lasting until the end of the 2004–05 season. In the final game of the season, he scored his third goal for Bournemouth in a 4–2 defeat to Bradford City. He finished the campaign with twelve appearances and three goals in all competitions.

Following his loan spell at Bournemouth, Mills was among several young players included in the first-team squad ahead of the 2005–06 season. However, he remained out of the side for almost half the season before finally making his Southampton debut, starting in a 3–0 defeat to Watford on 26 December 2005. After making three further appearances, Mills' future at Southampton became uncertain, as his contract was set to expire in the summer and he began attracting interest from Manchester City.

=== Manchester City ===
Mills signed a three-and-a-half-year contract with Manchester City on 31 January 2006. There, he was reunited with Manchester City's reserve team manager Steve Wigley, who had previously worked with him during his time at Southampton's Academy. Mills described the opportunity as one he could not turn down.

He was initially assigned to the club's reserve side. However, while playing for the reserves, he suffered an ankle injury that sidelined him for several weeks. Mills made his first-team debut for Manchester City as a substitute for Danny Mills in the 84th minute of a 2–0 defeat to Chelsea on 25 March 2006. Two weeks later, on 8 April 2006, he made his first start for the club, playing at right-back in a 2–1 loss against Tottenham Hotspur. He finished the 2005–06 season with two appearances for Manchester City.

At the start of the 2006–07 season, Mills sustained another ankle injury but recovered to make his first appearance of the campaign in a 4–0 victory over Wigan Athletic on 21 October 2006. However, his first-team opportunities were limited, and on 26 January 2007, he was loaned to Colchester United on a one-month deal. He made his debut for Colchester on 30 January 2007, playing the full match and helping the team keep a clean sheet in a 1–0 win against Preston North End. His performances led to two extensions of the loan, during which he made nine appearances. Mills was recalled by Manchester City on 23 March 2007.

=== Doncaster Rovers ===
On 17 August 2007, Mills joined Doncaster Rovers on a six-month loan deal, linking up with manager Sean O'Driscoll for the second time in his career. He made his debut for the club on 25 August 2007, coming on as a substitute in the 83rd minute for Gareth Roberts in a 2–1 defeat to Bournemouth. Mills then scored in consecutive matches for Doncaster, against Cheltenham Town and Walsall, on 29 September and 2 October 2007 respectively. After joining, he quickly established himself as a first-team regular, making seventeen consecutive appearances and helping Doncaster keep five clean sheets during that period. On 21 November 2007, his loan spell was cut short due to a knee injury, and he returned to his parent club.

On 14 January 2008, Mills rejoined Doncaster Rovers on loan for the remainder of the season. He immediately returned to the starting eleven, playing at centre-back. Mills helped Doncaster keep four consecutive clean sheets between 29 January and 12 February 2008. However, he was sent off with a straight red card in a 2–2 draw against Huddersfield Town on 5 April 2008. After serving his suspension, he returned to the starting line-up against Leyton Orient and subsequently scored his third goal for Doncaster in a 2–1 victory over Luton Town on 26 April 2008. Mills then played a key role in helping Doncaster secure promotion to the Championship, as they defeated Leeds United at Wembley Stadium in the League One play-off final on 25 May 2008. He finished the 2007–08 season with 41 appearances and three goals in all competitions.

Following promotion, Mills expressed a desire to join Doncaster permanently and was expected to sign during the close season. After two months of speculation, during which his move was in doubt due to a managerial change at Manchester City, he was finally unveiled as Doncaster Rovers' record signing on 30 July 2008, signing a three-year contract. Doncaster paid £300,000 for his services, which at the time was the highest transfer fee in the club's history.

Mills' first match after signing permanently came in the opening game of the season against Derby County, where he helped keep a clean sheet in a 1–0 win. Following the match, he was named in the Championship Team of the Week. In the following game against Cardiff City, Mills provided the assist for the opening goal in a 1–1 draw. He continued to establish himself as a regular starter at centre-back. Mills helped the club keep three consecutive clean sheets between 15 November and 25 November 2008. However, he was sent off with a straight red card in the 20th minute of a 2–1 defeat to Crystal Palace on 13 December 2008. After serving a one-match suspension, he returned to the starting line-up against Nottingham Forest on 26 December 2008, contributing to a 4–2 victory. Mills again helped Doncaster achieve three consecutive clean sheets between 20 January and 27 January 2009. Despite missing five matches during the season, he made 45 appearances in the 2008–09 season. For his performances, he was named Doncaster Rovers' Player of the Year.

In the summer of 2009, Mills attracted interest from several clubs, including Birmingham City and Newcastle United. On 10 June 2009, Nottingham Forest submitted an offer of £2 million, which was rejected by Doncaster. A subsequent offer from Reading was accepted, and Mills departed Doncaster in August 2009

=== Reading ===
On 5 August 2009, Mills was officially unveiled as a Reading player, signing a three-year contract under manager Brendan Rodgers. The exact transfer fee was undisclosed, though it was believed to be in the region of £2 million.

Mills made his Reading debut on 11 August 2009, playing the full match in a 5–1 victory over Burton Albion in the first round of the League Cup. He then made his league debut for the club on 18 August 2009, starting and keeping a clean sheet in a 0–0 draw against Swansea City. Four days later, on 22 August 2009, he scored his first goal for Reading in a 3–1 defeat to Sheffield United. However, Mills initially found first-team opportunities limited and was often named on the substitutes' bench for tactical reasons, according to manager Rodgers. He also struggled with injuries during this period. Nevertheless, he scored his second goal for the club on 17 October 2009 in a 3–1 loss to West Bromwich Albion. By January, he had regained his place in the starting line-up, displacing Alex Pearce and Darren O'Dea.

Mills received praise for his performances, notably after helping the club defeat Liverpool in the FA Cup third round replay on 13 January 2010. However, on 7 February 2010, against his former club Doncaster Rovers, he was sent off in the 80th minute for handball, resulting in a penalty, though Reading went on to win 2–1. After serving a one-match suspension, he returned to the starting line-up against Crystal Palace on 17 February 2010, captaining the side in the absence of Ívar Ingimarsson as they won 3–1. He captained the team again in the following match against Blackpool, which Reading lost 2–0.

Following a 1–0 victory over Queens Park Rangers in March 2010, Mills was seen making an apparent obscene gesture towards Reading supporters, for which he later apologised. Manager Brian McDermott attributed the gesture to Mills' passion, describing his form as "inspirational" and stating that it would not affect his relationship with the fans. However, he was sent off for a second time that season on 3 April 2010 against Ipswich Town for a two-footed challenge in the 30th minute of a 2–1 defeat. After serving a four-match ban, he returned to the starting line-up and resumed captaincy duties against Watford on 24 April 2010, a match Reading lost 4–0. In Ingimarsson's absence, Mills captained the side for the remainder of the season. He finished the 2009–10 season with 30 appearances and two goals in all competitions.

Ahead of the 2010–11 season, Mills stated that he intended to focus on his fitness rather than the captaincy. However, he continued as captain in Ingimarsson's absence. In the opening match of the season, a 2–1 defeat to Scunthorpe United, Mills suffered an ankle injury that kept him out for one match. He returned on 21 August 2010 against Nottingham Forest and shortly afterwards scored twice in a 3–3 League Cup draw with Northampton Town. This was followed by scoring the winning goal in a 2–1 victory away at Leicester City three days later, in which he also made a crucial goal-line clearance and was named Man of the Match.

After returning from injury, Mills remained a regular starter at centre-back throughout the season. On 28 September 2010, he was sent off for a second bookable offence in a 1–0 win against Ipswich Town. On 30 October 2010, he scored his fourth goal of the season against his former club Doncaster Rovers in a 4–3 victory. On 1 March 2011, he scored the only goal in a 1–0 win over Everton to send Reading into the FA Cup quarter-finals. In a subsequent match against Ipswich Town, he suffered a groin injury after just 16 minutes and was substituted, with Reading winning 3–1. It was announced he would be sidelined for a month. Mills had also previously missed matches that season through injury. He returned to the starting line-up on 12 April 2011 against Scunthorpe United, helping the team keep a clean sheet in a 2–0 win.

Following his return, Mills played a key role in helping Reading secure a play-off place. He featured in both legs of the play-off semi-final against Cardiff City, helping the team win 3–0 on aggregate and reach the final. On 30 May 2011, Mills captained Reading in the Championship play-off final against Swansea City, scoring a header in the 57th minute and receiving a booking in a 4–2 defeat at Wembley Stadium. He finished the 2010–11 season with 45 appearances and six goals in all competitions.

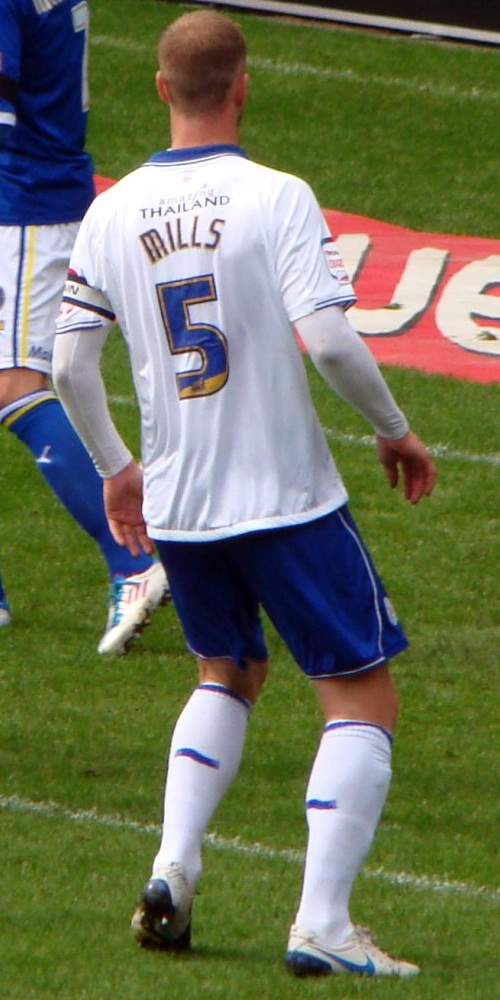
Mills playing for Leicester City against Cardiff City.

Ahead of the 2011–12 season, Mills was expected to continue as Reading captain. However, he was linked with a move away from the club, with interest from Bolton Wanderers, Stoke City, and Wolverhampton Wanderers. Although he initially expressed a desire to remain at Reading, on 1 July 2011 it was reported that he would be leaving after both parties failed to agree on a new contract.

=== Leicester City ===
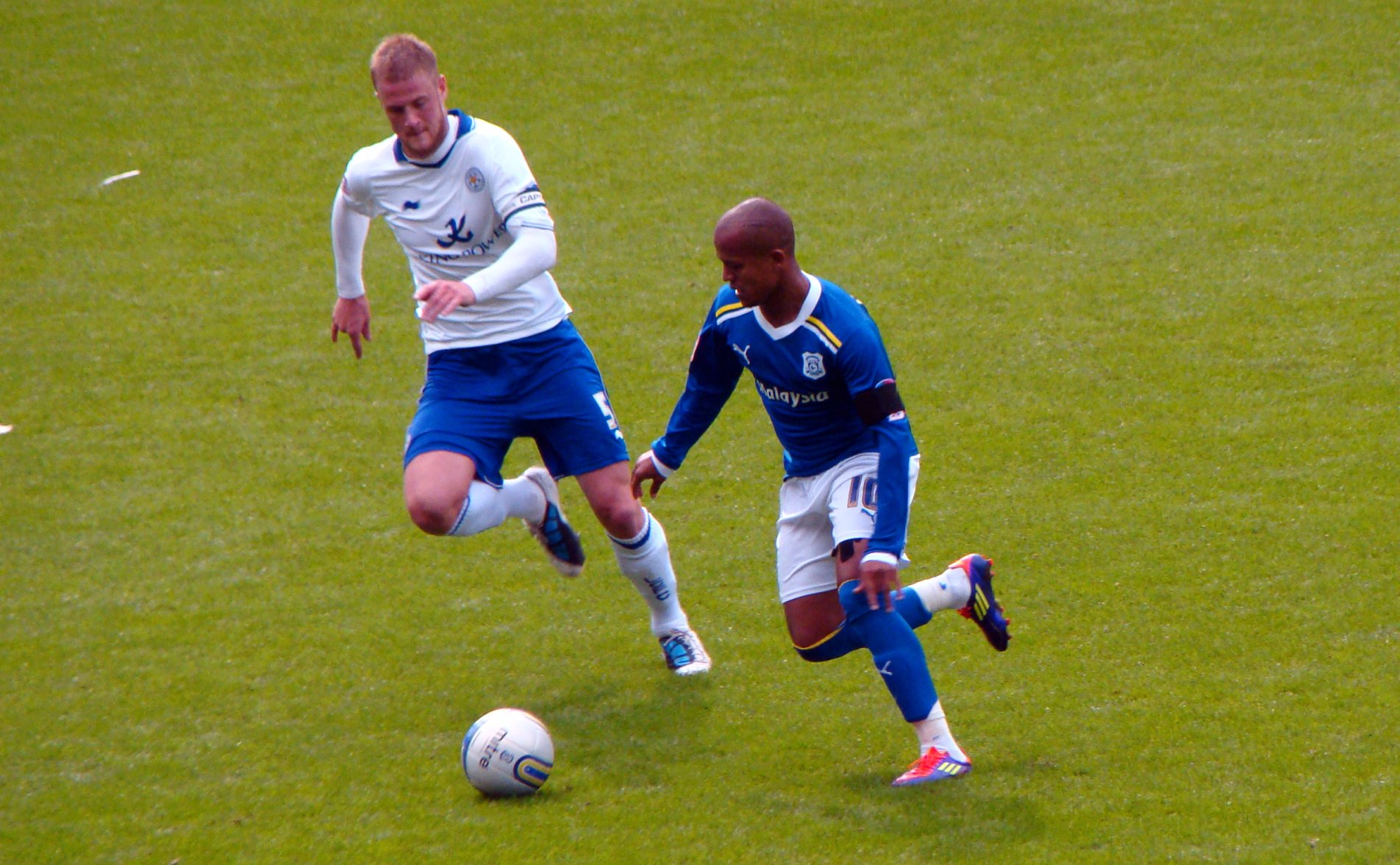
Mills in a league match against Cardiff City on 25 September 2011

On 7 July 2011, Mills signed a four-year contract with Leicester City for an undisclosed fee, reportedly earning £25,000 per week (£1.3 million per year). He was subsequently confirmed as club captain for the 2011–12 season, reuniting with former Manchester City manager Sven-Göran Eriksson. Mills had rejected an offer from Premier League side Wolverhampton Wanderers in order to join Leicester. Ian Stringer of BBC Radio Leicester described him as a "solid centre-half" and selected him as the club's key player for the 2011–12 season.

Mills made his league debut for Leicester City on 6 August 2011, captaining the side to a 1–0 victory over Coventry City at the Ricoh Arena. He continued to captain the team in a number of matches, firmly establishing himself in the starting line-up. Mills helped Leicester keep four consecutive clean sheets between 17 September and 1 October 2011. However, on 16 October 2011, he was sent off in the 55th minute of a 2–0 defeat to Birmingham City for a two-footed tackle on Morgaro Gomis. After serving a three-match ban, he returned to the starting line-up against Burnley on 1 November 2011, contributing to a 3–1 victory.

Six weeks after his first dismissal, Mills was sent off again for a professional foul on Aaron McLean in a 2–1 defeat to Hull City on 3 December 2011. Following a two-match suspension, he returned to the starting line-up against Ipswich Town on 26 December 2011, in a 2–2 draw. Mills scored his only goal for Leicester City in a 2–0 win over Southampton at St Mary's Stadium on 24 January 2012.

In February 2012, reports emerged of an alleged dispute with new manager Nigel Pearson, which Mills denied. He subsequently lost the captaincy and was relegated to training with the club's youth academy. He did not travel with the squad for the 1–0 victory against Derby County on 23 February 2012, prompting speculation about his future at the club. Mills was later informed by phone that he was permitted to leave Leicester. Although linked with moves to league rivals Leeds United and West Ham United, he refused to leave on loan, stating it would have been "very disrespectful for the fans". Despite no transfer materialising, he did not play for Leicester again, finishing the season with one goal from 31 appearances in all competitions.

=== Bolton Wanderers ===
On 4 July 2012, Mills signed a three-year contract with Bolton Wanderers for an undisclosed fee. Upon joining the club, he stated: "This deal has worked out perfectly for me, mainly because Bolton are a fantastic club. Speaking to the manager, I got the vibe of what the place and club are about and the ambitions of getting back into the Premier League." Mills was given the number four shirt for the 2012–13 season.

He made his debut for the club in a 2–0 home victory over Derby County on 21 August 2012. Mills scored his first goal for Bolton on 15 September 2012 in a 2–1 win against Watford. After joining, he quickly established himself as a first-team regular at centre-back. However, he suffered an upper thigh injury and was substituted in the 85th minute of a 2–2 draw against Huddersfield Town on 8 December 2012. Initially expected to be out for two to three weeks, he was ultimately sidelined for four to five months. Mills returned on 2 April 2013, coming on as a late substitute for Chris Eagles to help secure a 1–0 victory against Huddersfield Town. Following his return, he was unable to reclaim a regular starting position due to the form of Craig Dawson, Tim Ream, and Zat Knight. He finished the 2012–13 season with 21 appearances and one goal in all competitions.

In July 2013, Mills was linked with a move to Leeds United to reunite with his former Reading manager Brian McDermott. Bolton manager Dougie Freedman confirmed that Leeds had made an enquiry, stating he wanted Mills to stay but would allow him to leave if the right offer was made.

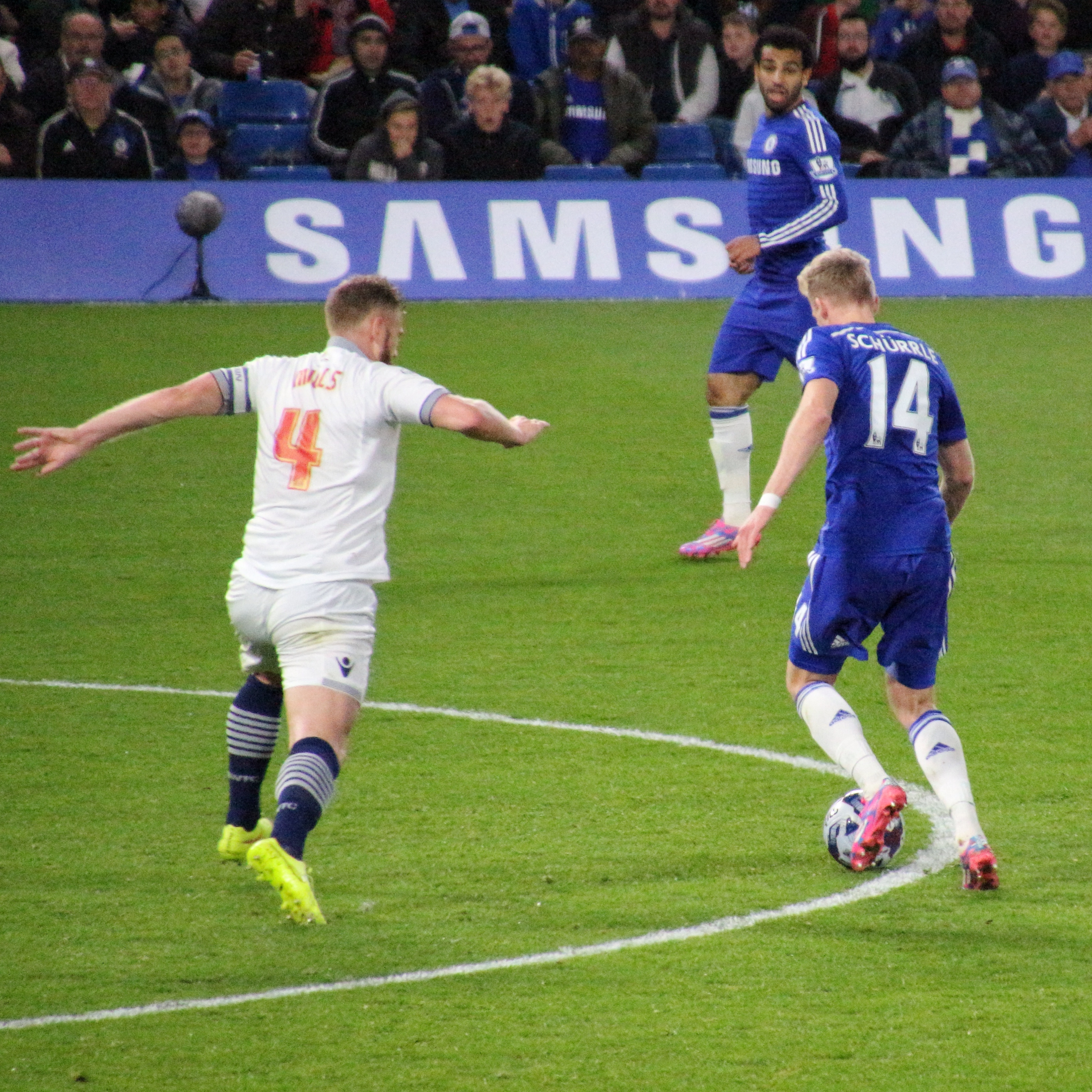
Mills (left) playing for Bolton Wanderers against Chelsea in the League Cup, 2014.

At the start of the 2013–14 season, Mills returned to the first team in the League Cup second round tie against Tranmere Rovers. He was one of two Bolton players to convert a penalty, though the club lost 4–2 in a shoot-out after a 120-minute draw. Following his return, Mills regained his place in the side and formed defensive partnerships with David Wheater and Tim Ream. His performances in central defence alongside Ream and Wheater were praised by manager Freedman.

During a 3–2 defeat to Wigan Athletic on 15 December 2013, Mills was penalised for handball, resulting in a converted penalty for the opposition. After the match, both Mills and Freedman criticised the decision, with Mills stating: "The ball came over my head and I'm facing my own goal, I got a push in my back and the referee gave a corner. All of a sudden I see he has given a penalty because the linesman on the other side of the pitch has seen the ball intentionally hit my hand. I haven't got eyes in the back of my head but how does he change his mind? I'm gutted for the fans, obviously."

On 11 January 2014, Mills scored his first goal of the season in a 1–1 draw against Nottingham Forest. However, he was later sidelined with a minor knee problem sustained against Watford on 22 February 2014. After a month out, he returned to the first team on 12 April 2014, assisting Jermaine Beckford's goal in a 1–0 victory over Barnsley. Mills finished the 2013–14 season with 35 appearances and one goal in all competitions.

Ahead of the 2014–15 season, Mills was named vice-captain to Jay Spearing. He maintained a regular place in the starting line-up, forming partnerships with Ream and Dorian Dervite. Mills scored his first goal of the season on 23 August 2014 in a 2–1 defeat to Brighton & Hove Albion. Three days later, on 26 August 2014, he captained the side for the first time that season and helped Bolton win 3–2 after extra time. He captained the team again in the League Cup against Chelsea, scoring in a 2–1 defeat.

Mills then scored the only goal in a 1–0 win over Birmingham City on 18 October 2014. Following Spearing's injury, Mills captained the side in a 3–0 win over Cardiff City on 4 November 2014 and retained the armband for the next two months as the club battled relegation. During this period, Bolton kept four consecutive clean sheets between 29 November and 19 December 2014.

On 27 January 2015, Mills scored and provided an assist for Liam Trotter in a 4–2 defeat to Rotherham United. A week later, on 4 February 2015, Mills played as a makeshift striker in an FA Cup tie against Liverpool due to an injury crisis, with Bolton losing 2–1. He then suffered an injury that kept him out for several weeks. Mills returned to the starting line-up on 21 February 2015 against Nottingham Forest but was sent off for a second bookable offence in a 4–1 loss, leading to a one-match suspension. After returning, he continued to captain the side for a further nine matches. However, he suffered two further injuries that ruled him out for the remainder of the season. Mills finished the 2014–15 season with 41 appearances and five goals in all competitions.

At the end of the season, Mills finished third in the club's Player of the Year voting, receiving 17 per cent of the votes behind Josh Vela and Tim Ream. Despite being offered a new contract by manager Neil Lennon, Mills was among 13 players released by the club in May 2015 as part of cost-cutting measures.

=== Nottingham Forest ===
On 1 July 2015, Mills signed for Nottingham Forest as a free agent, reuniting with former Bolton manager Dougie Freedman in the process. Upon joining the club, he was assigned the number five shirt for the new season.

Mills made his Nottingham Forest debut in the opening game of the season, a 1–0 defeat to Brighton & Hove Albion. He captained the side for the first time following Henri Lansbury's injury on 29 August 2015, in a 2–1 loss to Cardiff City. After his debut, Mills started each of Forest's first eight matches of the season, scoring twice, before sustaining an injury shortly after equalising against Middlesbrough on 19 September 2015, which forced him to miss the following match against Huddersfield Town. He returned to the starting line-up against Hull City on 3 October 2015 but was sent off in the 87th minute by referee Nigel Miller following an aerial challenge with Hull's on-loan striker Chuba Akpom, as Forest lost 1–0. After serving a three-match suspension, Mills returned as captain against Sheffield Wednesday on 31 October 2015, in a 1–0 defeat.

Following his return, Mills regained his place in the starting eleven at centre-back and resumed captaincy duties in the absence of Chris Cohen and Andy Reid. On 5 December 2015, he scored twice in a 3–0 win over Fulham, with a third headed effort in stoppage time hitting the crossbar. For his performance, he was named in the Championship Team of the Week. Having played a key role in an unbeaten December, Mills was nominated for the Sky Bet Championship Player of the Month award on 7 January 2016, but lost out to Adam Clayton. Five days later, on 12 January 2016, he scored his fifth goal of the season in a 1–1 draw with Birmingham City. He then helped Forest keep four consecutive clean sheets between 16 January and 6 February 2016. In his first season at Forest, Mills made 42 appearances and scored five goals in all competitions.

Mills made his first appearance of the 2016–17 season in Forest's opening match, a 4–3 victory over Burton Albion under new manager Philippe Montanier. He continued to feature regularly at centre-back. On 14 September 2016, he scored his first goal of the season in a 2–2 draw against Rotherham United. A month later, he was sent off in a 3–1 defeat to Newcastle United, a decision which manager Montanier stated had been exaggerated by the fourth official. Mills subsequently served a one-match suspension.

Earlier that season, he had also been sidelined due to injury, suspension, and tactical changes. After Montanier's departure and the sale of captain Henri Lansbury, Mills was named captain by caretaker manager Gary Brazil, having previously captained six of the preceding seven matches. However, he was substituted after 55 minutes in Brazil's first match in charge due to a groin injury, which was later confirmed would sideline him for two months. On 4 April 2017, he returned to the starting line-up against Wolverhampton Wanderers, playing the full match in a 1–0 defeat. His return was short-lived, as he suffered a knock against Blackburn Rovers on 14 April 2017 and was subsequently substituted, missing the following two matches. Mills returned to the squad on 29 April 2017 against Queens Park Rangers, coming on as a 62nd-minute substitute in a 2–0 defeat. At the end of the 2016–17 season, he had made 30 appearances and scored one goal in all competitions.

At the start of the 2017–18 season, Mills continued to feature regularly at centre-back. In the absence of Michael Mancienne, he captained the side for the first time that season on 19 August 2017, in a 2–1 win over Middlesbrough. Mills went on to captain five of the next six matches. However, he was sidelined for one match due to suspension. After serving his suspension, he found himself out of the starting line-up for two months, being named on the bench and making only one appearance during this period. On 9 December 2017, he made his first start in two months, playing the full match in a 3–2 win over Bolton Wanderers. His return was brief, as he suffered a back injury and was substituted at half-time in a 2–1 defeat to Bristol City on 16 December 2017. On 7 January 2018, he returned from injury as a late substitute in a 4–2 victory against Arsenal in the FA Cup third round.

However, new manager Aitor Karanka subsequently informed Mills that he was free to leave the club, having been deemed surplus to requirements. On 31 January 2018, Mills left Nottingham Forest by mutual agreement after terminating his contract. By the time of his departure, he had made 15 appearances in all competitions during the 2017–18 season.

=== Barnsley ===
On 31 January 2018, Mills signed for Barnsley on a short-term contract until the end of the season.

Three days later, he made his debut for the club, playing the full match in a 1–0 defeat against Queens Park Rangers. After making two further starts, Mills was sidelined for a month with an ankle injury. He returned to the starting line-up on 21 April 2018 against Leeds United, as Barnsley lost 2–1. Following his return, Mills remained involved with the first team as the club were relegated from the EFL Championship at the end of the season.

Mills made four appearances for Barnsley during the 2017–18 season. He was subsequently released following the club's relegation.

=== Pune City ===
On 21 August 2018, Mills joined Indian Super League club Pune City.

He made his debut for the club in the opening match of the season, playing the full game in a 1–1 draw against Delhi Dynamos. On 21 November 2018, he scored his first goal for Pune City in a 2–1 victory over Jamshedpur. Mills captained the side on two occasions, against Kerala Blasters on 7 December 2018 and against Goa on 11 December 2018. However, he later suffered a calf injury which ruled him out for several weeks. He returned to the first team on 20 February 2019, coming on as a 61st-minute substitute in a 1–1 draw with NorthEast United.

Having established himself in the centre-back position, Mills went on to make seventeen appearances in all competitions during his time with the club.

=== Forest Green Rovers ===
On 31 May 2019, League Two club Forest Green Rovers announced the signing of Mills as a player-coach ahead of the 2019–20 season. Upon joining the club, he linked up with his younger brother, Joseph, and was assigned a squad number.

Mills made his debut for Forest Green Rovers in the opening match of the season, playing the full game and helping the team keep a clean sheet in a 1–0 victory over Oldham Athletic. He then started the following five matches before being sent off for a second bookable offence against Bradford City on 24 August 2019. He subsequently suffered a hamstring injury during a 2–0 defeat to Newport County on 31 August 2019.

After a spell on the sidelines, Mills returned to the starting line-up on 28 September 2019 against Salford City, helping the side keep a clean sheet in a 4–0 win. However, his comeback was short-lived, as he sustained another hamstring injury just ten minutes into the match against Crawley Town on 5 October 2019 and was substituted; Forest Green won the game 3–1. On 12 November 2019, he returned to the starting line-up and captained the team in a 6–0 defeat to Walsall.

Following this, he regained his place in the first team, featuring regularly at centre-back, but later lost his spot and was relegated to the substitutes' bench. The season ultimately came to a premature end due to the COVID-19 pandemic. At the conclusion of the 2019–20 season, Mills had made 21 appearances in all competitions.

Mills was released by Forest Green Rovers upon the expiry of his contract. He subsequently announced his retirement from professional football in July 2020.

== International career ==
Mills was called up to the England under-19 squad and helped the side qualify for the UEFA European Under-19 Championship in March 2005. He played an important role in helping the team reach the final, where they were defeated by France. Between 2004 and 2005, Mills made a total of eight appearances at under-19 level for England.

== Personal life ==
Born in Swindon, England, Mills and his family lived just ten minutes from the town's County Ground until he left at the age of 14. He was educated at Bradon Forest Secondary School in Purton, near Swindon.

Mills' youngest brother, Joseph, was also a trainee at Southampton and later played for Forest Green Rovers, where he was joined by Matt in May 2019. His other brothers, Jon-Paul and Jamie, have both played for Hellenic Football League side Witney United.

Mills was previously in a relationship with former Hollyoaks and Prisoners' Wives actress Emma Rigby. In 2014, he married Jade Elliott, daughter of former Leicester City and Scotland defender Matt Elliott. The couple have two daughters, Lyla and Aria.

== Career statistics ==
As of match played 7 March 2020

Appearances and goals by club, season and competition
Club	Season	League			National cup		League cup		Other		Total	
Club	Season	Division	Apps	Goals	Apps	Goals	Apps	Goals	Apps	Goals	Apps	Goals
Southampton	2003–04	Premier League	0	0	0	0	0	0	0	0	0	0
Southampton	2004–05	Premier League	0	0	0	0	0	0	—		0	0
Southampton	2005–06	Championship	4	0	0	0	2	0	—		6	0
Southampton	Total		4	0	0	0	2	0	0	0	6	0
Coventry City (loan)	2004–05	Championship	4	0	0	0	1	0	—		5	0
AFC Bournemouth (loan)	2004–05	League One	12	3	0	0	0	0	0	0	12	3
Manchester City	2005–06	Premier League	1	0	0	0	0	0	—		1	0
Manchester City	2006–07	Premier League	1	0	0	0	0	0	—		1	0
Manchester City	2007–08	Premier League	0	0	0	0	2	0	—		0	0
Manchester City	Total		2	0	0	0	0	0	—		2	0
Colchester United (loan)	2006–07	Championship	9	0	0	0	0	0	—		9	0
Doncaster Rovers (loan)	2007–08	League One	34	3	0	0	1	0	6 (Note: Three appearances in Football League Trophy, three in Football League play-offs)	0	41	3
Doncaster Rovers	2008–09	Championship	41	0	4	0	0	0	—		45	0
Doncaster Rovers	Total		75	3	4	0	1	0	6	0	86	3
Reading	2009–10	Championship	23	2	6	0	1	0	—		30	2
Reading	2010–11	Championship	38	2	3	1	1	2	3 (Note: Appearances in Football League play-offs)	1	45	6
Reading	Total		61	4	9	1	2	2	3	1	75	8
Leicester City	2011–12	Championship	25	1	3	0	3	0	—		31	1
Bolton Wanderers	2012–13	Championship	18	1	0	0	0	0	—		18	1
Bolton Wanderers	2013–14	Championship	32	1	2	0	1	0	—		35	1
Bolton Wanderers	2014–15	Championship	37	4	2	0	2	1	—		41	5
Bolton Wanderers	Total		87	6	4	0	3	1	—		94	7
Nottingham Forest	2015–16	Championship	42	5	0	0	0	0	—		42	5
Nottingham Forest	2016–17	Championship	27	1	0	0	3	0	—		30	1
Nottingham Forest	2017–18	Championship	13	0	1	0	1	0	—		15	0
Nottingham Forest	Total		82	6	1	0	4	0	—		87	6
Barnsley	2017–18	Championship	4	0	0	0	0	0	—		4	0
Pune City	2018–19	Indian Super League	15	1	0	0	—		—		15	1
Forest Green Rovers	2019–20	League Two	19	0	1	0	0	0	1 (Note: Appearances in EFL Trophy)	0	21	0
Career total			399	24	22	1	16	3	10	1	447	29

== Honours ==
Doncaster Rovers

- Football League One play-offs: 2008

Individual

- Doncaster Rovers Player of the Year 2008–09
