= 2017–18 Nottingham Forest F.C. season =

English football club season

Nottingham Forest
2017–18 season
- Owner: Evangelos Marinakis (80%); Sokratis Kominakis (20%)
- Chairman: Nicholas Randall QC
- Manager: Mark Warburton (until 31 December); Gary Brazil (caretaker, 31 December to 8 January); Aitor Karanka (from 8 January)
- Stadium: City Ground
- Championship: 17th
- FA Cup: Fourth round
- EFL Cup: Third round
- Top goalscorer: League: Kieran Dowell (9); All: Kieran Dowell (10)
- Highest home attendance: 29,106 (vs. Derby County, EFL Championship, 11 March)
- Lowest home attendance: 7,546 (vs. Shrewsbury Town, EFL Cup first round, 8 August)
Home colours	Away colours

The 2017–18 season was Nottingham Forest's 152nd season in existence, 10th consecutive season in the EFL Championship, and their first full season under the ownership of Evangelos Marinakis and Sokratis Kominakis, who had purchased the club from Fawaz Al-Hasawi on 18 May 2017. In addition to the Championship, the club participated in the FA Cup and EFL Cup. The season covers the period between 1 July 2017 and 30 June 2018.

== First team squad ==
As of 29 April 2018

No.	Player	Nationality	Date of birth (age)	Previous club	Joined first team	Player contracted until
Goalkeepers
1	Costel Pantilimon	ROU	1 February 1987 (aged 31)	Watford	2018	2018
26	Dimitar Evtimov	BUL	7 September 1993 (aged 24)	Chavdar Etropole	2011	2019
33	Stefanos Kapino	GRE	18 March 1994 (aged 24)	Olympiacos	2018	2019
43	Jordan Smith	ENG	8 December 1994 (aged 23)	Academy	2016	2020
Defenders
2	Eric Lichaj	USA	17 November 1988 (aged 29)	Aston Villa	2013	2019
3	Tobias Figueiredo	POR	2 February 1994 (aged 24)	Sporting CP	2018	2018
4	Michael Mancienne	ENG	8 January 1988 (aged 30)	Hamburger SV	2014	2019
13	Danny Fox	SCO	29 May 1986 (aged 32)	Southampton	2014	2019
25	Jack Hobbs	ENG	18 August 1988 (aged 29)	Hull City	2014	2018
27	Tendayi Darikwa	ZIM	13 December 1991 (aged 26)	Burnley	2017	2021
29	Juan Fuentes	ESP	5 January 1990 (aged 28)	Osasuna	2018	2018
42	Joe Worrall	ENG	10 January 1997 (aged 21)	Academy	2016	2022
Midfielders
5	Adlène Guedioura	ALG	12 November 1985 (aged 32)	Middlesbrough	2018	2020
7	Liam Bridcutt	SCO	8 May 1989 (aged 29)	Leeds United	2017	2020
10	Barrie McKay	SCO	30 December 1994 (aged 23)	Rangers	2017	2021
11	Ben Osborn	ENG	5 August 1994 (aged 23)	Academy	2012	2020
14	Matty Cash	ENG	7 August 1997 (aged 20)	Academy	2016	2021
18	Jack Colback	ENG	24 October 1989 (aged 28)	Newcastle United	2018	2018
20	Kieran Dowell	ENG	10 October 1997 (aged 20)	Everton	2017	2018
21	Ashkan Dejagah	IRN	5 July 1986 (aged 31)	VfL Wolfsburg	2018	2018
24	David Vaughan	WAL	18 February 1983 (aged 35)	Sunderland	2014	2018
31	Andreas Bouchalakis	GRE	5 April 1993 (aged 25)	Olympiacos	2017	2020
32	Ben Watson	ENG	9 July 1985 (aged 32)	Watford	2018	2020
Forwards
9	Daryl Murphy	IRL	15 March 1983 (aged 35)	Newcastle United	2017	2020
15	Lee Tomlin	ENG	12 January 1989 (aged 29)	Cardiff City	2018	2018
17	Ben Brereton	ENG	18 April 1999 (aged 19)	Academy	2017	2021
23	Joe Lolley	ENG	25 August 1992 (aged 25)	Huddersfield Town	2018	2022
39	Apostolos Vellios	GRE	8 January 1992 (aged 26)	Iraklis	2016	2020

=== New contracts ===
Date	Position	Nationality	Player	Length of contract	Player contracted until	Reference
7 July 2017	DF	ENG	Adam Crookes	—	—	
7 July 2017	FW	IRE	Gerry McDonagh	—	—	
7 July 2017	MF	ENG	Elvis Otim	—	—	
7 July 2017	FW	ENG	Lewis Walters	—	—	
10 August 2017	MF	ENG	Toby Edser	3 years	2020	
8 October 2017	DF	ENG	Riley Harbottle	—	—	
24 October 2017	DF	ENG	Joe Worrall	4.5 years	2022	
11 January 2018	MF	ENG	Ryan Yates	2.5 years	2020	
12 January 2018	DF	USA	Eric Lichaj	1.5 years	2019	
24 January 2018	FW	ENG	Arvin Appiah	—	—	
20 February 2018	FW	ENG	Keith Asare	2.5 years	2020	
5 April 2018	DF	SCO	Danny Fox	1 year	2019	
20 June 2018	MF	ENG	Alex Mighten	2 year	2020	

== Player transfers ==
(Note: Please note that this section includes players in or out from date commencing 9 June 2017; the date that the UK Summer transfer window opened.)

=== Transfers in ===
First team
Date	Position	Nationality	Name	From	Fee	Reference
17 June 2017	FW	SCO	Jason Cummings	Hibernian	Undisclosed	
5 July 2017	MF	SCO	Barrie McKay	Rangers	Undisclosed	
21 July 2017	FW	IRL	Daryl Murphy	Newcastle United	Undisclosed	
26 July 2017	DF	ZIM	Tendayi Darikwa	Burnley	Undisclosed	
27 July 2017	MF	GRE	Andreas Bouchalakis	Olympiacos	Free transfer	
22 August 2017	MF	SCO	Liam Bridcutt	Leeds United	Undisclosed	
31 January 2018	MF	IRN	Ashkan Dejagah	Free Agent	Free transfer	
31 January 2018	FW	ENG	Joe Lolley	Huddersfield Town	Undisclosed	
31 January 2018	MF	ALG	Adlène Guédioura	Free Agent	Free transfer	
5 February 2018	MF	ENG	Ben Watson	Free Agent	Free transfer	
8 February 2018	GK	GRE	Stefanos Kapino	Free Agent	Free transfer	
8 February 2018	DF	ESP	Juan Fuentes	Free agent	Free Transfer	

PDS, Academy and other
Date	Position	Nationality	Name	From	Fee	Reference
7 July 2017	DF	ENG	Joe Coveney	Manchester City	Undisclosed	
12 July 2017	GK	IRL	Liam Bossin	Free Agent	Free Transfer	
12 January 2018	FW	NGR	Victor Sodeinde	Maidstone United	Undisclosed	

=== Loans in ===
First team
Date	Position	Nationality	Name	From	End of loan	Reference
3 August 2017	MF	ENG	Kieran Dowell	Everton	30 June 2018	
31 August 2017	GK	AUS	Adam Federici	Bournemouth	11 September 2017 (Note: Federici initially signed on loan until January 2018, but his loan spell was rescinded after he picked up a long-term injury with the Australian national team a few days after joining the club.)	
30 January 2018	DF	POR	Tobias Figueiredo	Sporting	30 June 2018	
31 January 2018	GK	ROM	Costel Pantilimon	Watford	30 June 2018	
31 January 2018	FW	ENG	Lee Tomlin	Cardiff City	30 June 2018	
31 January 2018	MF	ENG	Jack Colback	Newcastle United	30 June 2018	

=== Transfers out ===
First team
Date	Position	Nationality	Name	To	Fee	Reference
1 July 2017	FW	ENG	Matty Fryatt	Free Agent (later retired)	Released	
1 July 2017	DF	ESP	Daniel Pinillos	Free Agent (later joined Córdoba)	Released	
17 July 2017	FW	DRC	Britt Assombalonga	Middlesbrough	£15,000,000	
24 July 2017	DF	POL	Damien Perquis	Free Agent (later joined Gazélec Ajaccio)	Contract terminated	
15 August 2017	GK	SER	Vladimir Stojković	Free Agent (later joined Partizan)	Contract terminated	
31 August 2017	MF	POR	Licá	Free Agent (later joined Granada)	Contract Terminated	
31 January 2018	MF	GAM	Mustapha Carayol	Free Agent (later joined Ipswich Town)	Contract Terminated	
31 January 2018	DF	ENG	Matt Mills	Free Agent (later joined Barnsley)	Contract terminated	

PDS, Academy and other
Date	Position	Nationality	Name	To	Fee	Reference
1 July 2017	GK	AUS	Chris Marques	Free Agent	Released	
1 July 2017	DF	DEN	Frederik Nielsen	Free agent (later joined Sheffield Wednesday)	Released	
1 July 2017	FW	ENG	James Thorne	Free Agent (later joined Hartlepool United)	Released	
1 July 2017	MF	ENG	Rob Worrall	Free Agent (later joined Brighouse Town)	Released	
27 April 2018	FW	IRE	Gerry McDonagh	Free Agent	Released	

=== Loans out ===
First team
Date	Position	Nationality	Name	To	End of loan	Reference
17 July 2017	MF	USA	Gboly Ariyibi	Milton Keynes Dons	17 January 2018	
20 July 2017	MF	ENG	Jorge Grant	Notts County	30 June 2018	
30 August 2017	DF	FIN	Thomas Lam	Twente	30 June 2018	
28 October 2017	GK	BUL	Dimitar Evtimov	Port Vale	4 November 2017	
15 January 2018	FW	SCO	Jason Cummings	Rangers	30 June 2018	
19 January 2018	MF	USA	Gboly Ariyibi	Northampton Town	30 June 2018	
31 January 2018	FW	ENG	Tyler Walker	Bolton Wanderers	30 June 2018	
31 January 2018	GK	IRE	Stephen Henderson	Portsmouth	30 June 2018	
31 January 2018	MF	NIR	Jamie Ward	Cardiff City	30 June 2018	
31 January 2018	FW	ENG	Zach Clough	Bolton Wanderers	30 June 2018	
3 February 2018	DF	SEN	Armand Traoré	Cardiff City	30 June 2018	

PDS, Academy and other
Date	Position	Nationality	Name	To	End of loan	Reference
31 July 2017	DF	SCO	Alex Iacovitti	Forest Green Rovers	1 January 2018	
4 August 2017	MF	ENG	Ryan Yates	Notts County	10 January 2018	
29 September 2017	GK	ENG	Jordan Wright	Kettering Town	30 October 2017	
5 October 2017	FW	IRL	Gerry McDonagh	Tranmere Rovers	January 2018	
7 December 2017	FW	ENG	Lewis Walters	Barrow	5 January 2018	
15 December 2017	DF	ENG	Adam Crookes	Guiseley	30 June 2018	
11 January 2018	MF	ENG	Ryan Yates	Scunthorpe United	30 June 2018	

== Pre-season friendlies ==
Nottingham Forest began their pre-season with a training camp at the IMG Academy in Florida, United States, between 3 and 14 July, which also included a training match against Deportivo Saprissa of Costa Rica. On their return to England, Forest played four friendlies within the borders of Nottinghamshire against city rivals Notts County, Mansfield Town, Girona and Burnley.

Forest's friendly against Notts County marked the inaugural game played for the Derek Pavis Trophy, named in honour of the former County chairman and Forest vice-chairman who had died in May 2017. Forest were awarded the trophy post-match after their 2–0 victory.

19 July 2017	Notts County	0–2	Nottingham Forest	Nottingham
19:45 BST		Report	50' Brereton; 88' Vellios	Stadium: Meadow Lane; Attendance: 12,209; Referee: James Adcock

22 July 2017	Mansfield Town	0–4	Nottingham Forest	Mansfield
15:00 BST		Report	26' Cummings; 69' Walker; 82' 89' Vellios	Stadium: One Call Stadium; Attendance: 5,333; Referee: Mark Heywood

25 July 2017	Nottingham Forest	2–1	Girona	West Bridgford
19:45 BST	Vellios 65' 68' (pen.)	Report	40' Andrés	Stadium: The City Ground; Attendance: 4,417; Referee: Oliver Langford

29 July 2017	Nottingham Forest	1–1	Burnley	West Bridgford
15:00 BST	Murphy 33'	Report	56' Gray	Stadium: The City Ground; Attendance: 10,231; Referee: Andy Woolmer

== Competitions ==
=== Championship ===
==== League table ====
Pos	Team	Pld	W	D	L	GF	GA	GD	Pts
15	Sheffield Wednesday	46	14	15	17	59	60	−1	57
16	Queens Park Rangers	46	15	11	20	58	70	−12	56
17	Nottingham Forest	46	15	8	23	51	65	−14	53
18	Hull City	46	11	16	19	70	70	0	49
19	Birmingham City	46	13	7	26	38	68	−30	46

Source: English Football League
Rules for classification: 1) Points; 2) Goal difference; 3) Number of goals scored

==== Result summary ====
Overall								Home						Away					
Pld	W	D	L	GF	GA	GD	Pts	W	D	L	GF	GA	GD	W	D	L	GF	GA	GD
46	15	8	23	51	65	−14	53	10	3	10	25	27	−2	5	5	13	26	38	−12

Last updated: 6 May 2018.

==== Results by matchday ====
Matchday	1	2	3	4	5	6	7	8	9	10	11	12	13	14	15	16	17	18	19	20	21	22	23	24	25	26	27	28	29	30	31	32	33	34	35	36	37	38	39	40	41	42	43	44	45	46
Ground	H	A	A	H	H	A	A	H	A	H	H	A	H	A	A	H	A	H	H	A	H	A	A	H	H	A	H	A	H	A	H	A	H	A	H	A	H	A	A	A	H	H	A	H	H	A
Result	W	W	L	W	L	L	W	L	L	L	W	L	W	W	L	W	L	W	L	L	W	L	D	L	L	D	L	W	L	L	L	D	D	W	W	D	D	D	L	L	L	W	L	W	D	L
Position	6	3	5	4	6	12	8	10	12	16	13	14	12	11	13	9	11	7	9	13	11	11	13	13	14	14	15	14	15	16	16	17	17	15	15	15	15	16	16	17	18	17	17	17	17	17

Updated to match(es) played on 6 May 2018. Source: Statto.com
A = Away; H = Home; W = Win; D = Draw; L = Loss

==== Matches ====
4 August 2017 1	Nottingham Forest	1–0	Millwall	West Bridgford
19:45 BST	McKay 41'	Report	(yellow card) 89' Saville	Stadium: The City Ground; Attendance: 28,065; Referee: Peter Bankes

12 August 2017 2	Brentford	3–4	Nottingham Forest	Hounslow
15:00 BST	Egan 38'; Bjelland 79'; Henry (yellow card) 81'; Maupay 90'	Report	(yellow card) 28' (goal) 41' 47' Bouchalakis; 43' Murphy; (yellow card) 82' Vaughan; 83' Dowell; (yellow card) 86' Mills	Stadium: Griffin Park; Attendance: 10,169; Referee: James Linington

15 August 2017 3	Barnsley	2–1	Nottingham Forest	Barnsley
19:45 BST	Pearson 4'; Hedges 50'; Potts (yellow card) 81'; Williams (yellow card) 87'	Report	26' Murphy; (yellow card) 30' Mancienne	Stadium: Oakwell Stadium; Attendance: 13,883; Referee: Tony Harrington

19 August 2017 4	Nottingham Forest	2–1	Middlesbrough	West Bridgford
15:00 BST	Darikwa (yellow card) 15'; McKay 16'; Traoré (yellow card) 18'; Murphy 79' (pen.)	Report	(yellow card) 39' Clayton; (yellow card) 63' Fry; (yellow card) 76' Assombalonga; 83' (yellow card) 89' Gibson	Stadium: The City Ground; Attendance: 26,265; Referee: Graham Scott

26 August 2017 5	Nottingham Forest	0–2	Leeds United	West Bridgford
17:30 BST	Mills (yellow card) 48'; Bridcutt (yellow card) 56'	Report	24' Roofe; (yellow card) 59' Hernández; (yellow card) 82' Ayling; 87' Alioski	Stadium: The City Ground; Attendance: 25,682; Referee: Jeremy Anderson

9 September 2017 6	Sheffield Wednesday	3–1	Nottingham Forest	Sheffield
17:30 BST	Hooper 23'; Fletcher 63'; Lee 70'; Wallace (yellow card) 75'	Report	29' Osborn	Stadium: Hillsborough Stadium; Attendance: 25,710; Referee: Andrew Madley

12 September 2017 7	Sunderland	0–1	Nottingham Forest	Sunderland
19:45 BST	Cattermole (yellow card) 48'	Report	86' Murphy; (yellow card) 90' Cummings	Stadium: Stadium of Light; Attendance: 26,021; Referee: Simon Hooper

16 September 2017 8	Nottingham Forest	1–2	Wolverhampton Wanderers	West Bridgford
15:00 BST	Carayol 75'; Mills (yellow card) 82'; Bridcutt (yellow card) 90'	Report	47' 81' Jota; (yellow card) 56' Cavaleiro; (yellow card) 90' Marshall	Stadium: The City Ground; Attendance: 25,756; Referee: Geoff Eltringham

23 September 2017 9	Aston Villa	2–1	Nottingham Forest	Birmingham
17:30 BST	Adomah 15'; Hourihane 60'; Taylor (yellow card) 90'	Report	(yellow card) 42' Bridcutt; 53' Murphy; (yellow card) 59' Brereton; (yellow card) 89' Mills	Stadium: Villa Park; Attendance: 28,554; Referee: Tim Robinson

26 September 2017 10	Nottingham Forest	1–3	Fulham	West Bridgford
19:45 BST	Murphy 33'; Worrall (yellow card) 55'; Mills (yellow card) 71'	Report	13' Kamara; 72' Johansen; 89' Kebano	Stadium: The City Ground; Attendance: 21,208; Referee: Scott Duncan

30 September 2017 11	Nottingham Forest	2–1	Sheffield United	West Bridgford
15:00 BST	Cummings 9'; Dowell 27'; Bouchalakis (yellow card) 83'; Osborn (yellow card) 84'; Bridcutt (yellow card) 88'	Report	3' (yellow card) 21' Lundstram; (yellow card) 43' Coutts; (yellow card) 90' Duffy; (yellow card) 90' Stevens	Stadium: The City Ground; Attendance: 25,700; Referee: Andy Davies

15 October 2017 12	Derby County	2–0	Nottingham Forest	Derby
13:15 BST	Vydra 1'; Nugent 50'	Report	(yellow card) 67' Fox	Stadium: Pride Park Stadium; Attendance: 31,196; Referee: Andrew Madley

21 October 2017 13	Nottingham Forest	2–0	Burton Albion	West Bridgford
15:00 BST	McKay 58'; Lichaj 78'	Report	(yellow card) 47' Turner; (yellow card) 57' Murphy	Stadium: The City Ground; Attendance: 24,686; Referee: Keith Stroud

28 October 2017 14	Hull City	2–3	Nottingham Forest	Kingston upon Hull
17:30 BST	Larsson (yellow card) 61'; Irvine (yellow card) 64'; Dawson (yellow card) 68'; Clark (yellow card) 74'; Bowen 76'; Hector 88'	Report	(yellow card) 24' Vaughan; 29' 71' 83' (pen.) Dowell; (yellow card) 86' Ward; (yellow card) 90' Walker	Stadium: KCOM Stadium; Attendance: 15,780; Referee: Jeremy Simpson

31 October 2017 15	Reading	3–1	Nottingham Forest	Reading
19:45 GMT	Swift 13' 70'; Aluko 78'	Report	(yellow card) 9' Lichaj; 86' Osborn	Stadium: Madejski Stadium; Attendance: 14,848; Referee: Paul Tierney

4 November 2017 16	Nottingham Forest	4–0	Queens Park Rangers	West Bridgford
15:00 GMT	Walker 13' 84' (yellow card) 73'; Dowell 44'; McKay 52'	Report	(yellow card) 70' Freeman	Stadium: The City Ground; Attendance: 24,021; Referee: Tim Robinson

18 November 2017 17	Birmingham City	1–0	Nottingham Forest	Birmingham
15:00 GMT	Adams 5'; Kieftenbeld (yellow card) 47'; Dean (yellow card) 55'	Report	(yellow card) 14' Worrall; (yellow card) 56' Dowell	Stadium: St Andrew's; Attendance: 21,071; Referee: Christopher Kavanagh

21 November 2017 18	Nottingham Forest	1–0	Norwich City	West Bridgford
19:45 GMT	Bridcutt (yellow card) 49'; Murphy 77'	Report	(yellow card) 65' Reed; (yellow card) 90+6' Zimmermann	Stadium: The City Ground; Attendance: 23,831; Referee: Tony Harrington

26 November 2017 19	Nottingham Forest	0–2	Cardiff City	West Bridgford
13:00 GMT	Traoré (yellow card) 14'	Report	24' Hoilett; 38' Ward; (yellow card) 65' Paterson; (yellow card) 86' Gounongbe	Stadium: The City Ground; Attendance: 25,210; Referee: Peter Bankes

2 December 2017 20	Ipswich Town	4–2	Nottingham Forest	Ipswich
15:00 GMT	Connolly 7' (yellow card) 86'; Iorfa 37'; Waghorn 53' (yellow card) 82'; Celina 67'	Report	29' (yellow card) 45' Dowell; 43' Walker; (yellow card) 90' Bridcutt	Stadium: Portman Road; Attendance: 16,808; Referee: Darren Bond

9 December 2017 21	Nottingham Forest	3–2	Bolton Wanderers	West Bridgford
15:00 GMT	McKay 3'; Mills (yellow card) 32'; Worrall 60'; Brereton 89'; Bridcutt (yellow card) 90+2'	Report	(yellow card) 30' Robinson; 45' Buckley; (yellow card) 87' Henry; 90+2' (o.g.) Worrall	Stadium: The City Ground; Attendance: 22,882; Referee: Darren England

16 December 2017 22	Bristol City	2–1	Nottingham Forest	Bristol
15:00 GMT	Brownhill (yellow card) 25'; Pack 36'; Bryan 45+1'; Woodrow (yellow card) 90+3'	Report	47' Dowell; (yellow card) 63' Bridcutt; (yellow card) 86' Worrall	Stadium: Ashton Gate Stadium; Attendance: 20,128; Referee: James Linington

23 December 2017 23	Preston North End	1–1	Nottingham Forest	Preston
15:00 GMT	Huntington 75'; Pearson (yellow card) 86'; Gallagher (yellow card) 89'	Report	(yellow card) 31' Vaughan; (yellow card) 42' Bridcutt; (yellow card) 49' (goal) 58' Brereton; (yellow card) 68' Osborn	Stadium: Deepdale; Attendance: 13,481; Referee: Scott Duncan

26 December 2017 24	Nottingham Forest	0–3	Sheffield Wednesday	West Bridgford
15:00 GMT	Brereton (yellow card) 88'; Mancienne (yellow card) 90+5'	Report	5' Reach; 45+1' (pen.) Rhodes; 65' João	Stadium: The City Ground; Attendance: 28,635; Referee: Andrew Madley

30 December 2017 25	Nottingham Forest	0–1	Sunderland	West Bridgford
15:00 GMT	Traoré (yellow card) 82'	Report	40' McGeady	Stadium: The City Ground; Attendance: 26,830; Referee: Darren Bond

1 January 2018 26	Leeds United	0–0	Nottingham Forest	Leeds
15:00 GMT	Jansson (yellow card) 45'; Sáiz (yellow card) 90+3'	Report	(yellow card) 69' Lichaj; (yellow card) 85' Carayol	Stadium: Elland Road; Attendance: 32,426; Referee: Jeremy Simpson

13 January 2018 27	Nottingham Forest	0–1	Aston Villa	West Bridgford
17:30 GMT	Lichaj (yellow card) 61'; Cash (yellow card) 63'	Report	18' Hogan; (yellow card) 71' Elmohamady; (yellow card) 89' Terry	Stadium: The City Ground; Attendance: 25,433; Referee: James Linington

20 January 2018 28	Wolverhampton Wanderers	0–2	Nottingham Forest	Wolverhampton
15:00 GMT	Coady (yellow card) 38'; Jota (yellow card) 65'; Bennett (yellow card) 90'	Report	(yellow card) 6' Fox; (yellow card) 19' Worrall; (yellow card) 30' Bridcutt; 40' Dowell; 43' Osborn	Stadium: Molineux Stadium; Attendance: 29,050; Referee: Robert Madley

30 January 2018 29	Nottingham Forest	0–3	Preston North End	West Bridgford
19:45 GMT	Fox (yellow card) 44'; Darikwa (yellow card) 45'; Vaughan (yellow card) 86'	Report	35' (yellow card) 75' Bodin; 60' Barkhuizen; 83' (pen.) Johnson	Stadium: The City Ground; Attendance: 22,044; Referee: Geoff Eltringham

3 February 2018 30	Fulham	2–0	Nottingham Forest	Hammersmith and Fulham
15:00 GMT	Piazon 68'; McDonald (yellow card) 73'; Johansen 90'	Report	(yellow card) 47' Dowell; (yellow card) 70' Mancienne	Stadium: Craven Cottage; Attendance: 22,076; Referee: Tim Robinson

10 February 2018 31	Nottingham Forest	0–2	Hull City	West Bridgford
15:00 GMT	Fox (yellow card) 41'	Report	9' Toral; 38' Wilson; (yellow card) 60' Larsson	Stadium: The City Ground; Attendance: 23,098; Referee: Oliver Langford

17 February 2018 32	Burton Albion	0–0	Nottingham Forest	Burton upon Trent
15:00 GMT	Akins (yellow card) 12'	Report	(red card) 28' Lichaj; (yellow card) 29' Brereton; (yellow card) 90' Colback; (yellow card) 90' Dowell	Stadium: Pirelli Stadium; Attendance: 5,775; Referee: Andy Davies

20 February 2018 33	Nottingham Forest	1–1	Reading	West Bridgford
19:45 GMT	Osborn (yellow card) 62'; Tomlin (yellow card) 74' (goal) 85'; Figueiredo (yellow card) 77'	Report	35' (yellow card) 76' Richards; (yellow card) 37' Kelly; (yellow card) 78' Gunter	Stadium: The City Ground; Attendance: 21,846; Referee: Stephen Martin

24 February 2018 34	Queens Park Rangers	2–5	Nottingham Forest	Hammersmith and Fulham
15:00 GMT	Luongo 68'; Smith 78'; Scowen (yellow card) 84'	Report	(yellow card) 35' (goal) 37' 47' Tomlin; 51' Lolley; (yellow card) 72' Pantilimon; 76' Cash; 90' Brereton	Stadium: Loftus Road; Attendance: 13,675; Referee: Darren Bond

3 March 2018 35	Nottingham Forest	2–1	Birmingham City	West Bridgford
15:00 GMT	Lolley 6'; Darikwa (yellow card) 67'; Cash 79'	Report	(yellow card) 28' (goal) 87' Morrison; (yellow card) 83' Kieftenbeld	Stadium: The City Ground; Attendance: 23,296; Referee: Keith Stroud

6 March 2018 36	Norwich City	0–0	Nottingham Forest	Norwich
19:45 GMT	Tettey (yellow card) 84'; Maddison (yellow card) 90'	Report	(yellow card) 34' Figueiredo; (yellow card) 44' Colback; (yellow card) 81' Brereton; (yellow card) 85' Watson; (yellow card) 86' Darikwa	Stadium: Carrow Road; Attendance: 25,184; Referee: Darren England

11 March 2018 37	Nottingham Forest	0–0	Derby County	West Bridgford
14:30 GMT	Colback (yellow card) 33'; Watson (yellow card) 75'; Figueiredo (yellow card) 79'; Darikwa (yellow card) 90'	Report	(yellow card) 28' Lawrence; (yellow card) 78' (yellow-red card) 81' Huddlestone	Stadium: The City Ground; Attendance: 29,106; Referee: Jeremy Simpson

17 March 2018 38	Sheffield United	0–0	Nottingham Forest	Sheffield
15:00 GMT	Fleck (yellow card) 90'	Report	(yellow card) 44' Fox; (yellow card) 77' Watson; (yellow card) 87' Colback	Stadium: Bramall Lane; Attendance: 28,095; Referee: Paul Tierney

30 March 2018 39	Millwall	2–0	Nottingham Forest	Southwark
13:00 BST	Williams 1' (yellow card) 40'; Saville (yellow card) 29'; Gregory 33'; Morison (yellow card) 53'	Report	(yellow card) 12' Tomlin; (yellow card) 23' Figueiredo; (yellow card) 52' Fox	Stadium: The Den; Attendance: 16,004; Referee: Scott Duncan

7 April 2018 40	Middlesbrough	2–0	Nottingham Forest	Middlesbrough
15:00 BST	Ayala 7'; Downing 31'; Shotton (yellow card) 57'	Report	(yellow card) 13' Dowell; (yellow card) 34' Figueiredo	Stadium: Riverside Stadium; Attendance: 25,812; Referee: David Webb

10 April 2018 41	Nottingham Forest	0–1	Brentford	West Bridgford
19:45 BST	Guédioura (yellow card) 52'; Darikwa (yellow card) 55'	Report	81' Dalsgaard	Stadium: The City Ground; Attendance: 20,596; Referee: Andy Davies

14 April 2018 42	Nottingham Forest	2–1	Ipswich Town	West Bridgford
15:00 BST	Brereton (yellow card) 81' (goal) 89' (pen.); Lolley 90'	Report	38' (yellow card) 73' Ward	Stadium: The City Ground; Attendance: 25,093; Referee: Darren England

21 April 2018 43	Cardiff City	2–1	Nottingham Forest	Cardiff
19:45 BST	Morrison 35'; Gunnarsson 74'	Report	50' Bridcutt; (yellow card) 73' Mancienne; (yellow card) 73' Watson; (yellow card) 90' Colback	Stadium: Cardiff City Stadium; Attendance: 21,310; Referee: Peter Bankes

24 April 2018 44	Nottingham Forest	3–0	Barnsley	West Bridgford
19:45 BST	Fox (yellow card) 18'; Tomlin 26'; Brereton 36'; Guédioura (yellow card) 87'; Vellios 90'	Report	(yellow card) 53' Jackson	Stadium: The City Ground; Attendance: 23,633; Referee: Robert Jones

29 April 2018 45	Nottingham Forest	0–0	Bristol City	West Bridgford
15:00 BST	Colback (yellow card) 45'	Report	(yellow card) 64' Fielding	Stadium: The City Ground; Attendance: 24,722; Referee: Jeremy Simpson

6 May 2018 46	Bolton Wanderers	3–2	Nottingham Forest	Horwich
12:30 BST	Pratley (yellow card) 13'; Robinson (yellow card) 45'; Le Fondre 67'; Wheater 86'; Wilbraham 88'	Report	(yellow card) 7' Bridcutt; (yellow card) 39' Fox; (yellow card) 57' Lolley; 70' Osborn; 79' Colback; (yellow card) 82' Darikwa	Stadium: Macron Stadium; Attendance: 18,289; Referee: Scott Duncan

=== FA Cup ===
In the FA Cup, Forest entered the competition in the third round and were drawn at home to cup holders Arsenal.

7 January 2018 Third round	Nottingham Forest	4–2	Arsenal	West Bridgford
16:00 GMT	Lichaj 20', 44'; Brereton 64' (pen.); Dowell 85' (pen.); Worrall (yellow card) 88' (yellow-red card) 89'	Report	23' (yellow card) 86' Mertesacker; 79' (yellow card) 86' Welbeck; (yellow card) 84' Debuchy; (yellow card) 85' Ospina	Stadium: The City Ground; Attendance: 27,182; Referee: Jonathan Moss

27 January 2018 Fourth round	Hull City	2–1	Nottingham Forest	Kingston upon Hull
15:00 GMT	Bowen 18'; Dicko 40'; Mazuch (yellow card) 90'	Report	(yellow card) 25' Fox; 88' Vellios; (yellow card) 90' Worrall	Stadium: KCOM Stadium; Attendance: 13,450; Referee: Stuart Attwell

=== EFL Cup ===
On 16 June 2017 Nottingham Forest were drawn at home to Shrewsbury Town in their opening game of the EFL Cup, also known for sponsorship reasons as the Carabao Cup. A trip to Premier League side Newcastle United was confirmed for the second round. Forest were drawn to play the reigning Premier League champions Chelsea away in the third round.

8 August 2017 First round	Nottingham Forest	2–1	Shrewsbury Town	West Bridgford
19:45 BST	Fox (yellow card) 17'; Carayol 29' (pen.); Cummings (yellow card) 65' (goal) 75'	Report	(yellow card) 29' Ogogo; 79' (pen.) Whalley; (yellow card) 83' Ennis	Stadium: The City Ground; Attendance: 7,546; Referee: John Busby

23 August 2017 Second round	Newcastle United	2–3	Nottingham Forest	Newcastle upon Tyne
19:45 BST	Mitrović 3'; Aarons 45'; Hanley (yellow card) 85'	Report	29' 31' Cummings; (yellow card) 83' Worrall; 97' Walker; (yellow card) 111' Mancienne	Stadium: St. James' Park; Attendance: 27,709; Referee: Darren England

20 September 2017 Third round	Chelsea	5–1	Nottingham Forest	Hammersmith and Fulham
19:45 BST	Kenedy 13'; Batshuayi 19' 53' 86'; Musonda 40'	Report	(yellow card) 21' Hobbs; 90' Darikwa	Stadium: Stamford Bridge; Attendance: 40,621; Referee: Christopher Kavanagh

== Season statistics ==
=== Appearances and goals ===
As of match played 6 May 2018 (Note: Players whose names are in italics spent time on loan at other clubs during the course of the season.) (Note: Players whose names appear emboldened left the club on a permanent basis having appeared in a competitive fixture this season.)

No.	Pos	Nat	Player	Total		EFL Championship		Emirates FA Cup		EFL Cup	
No.	Pos	Nat	Player	Apps	Goals	Apps	Goals	Apps	Goals	Apps	Goals
1	GK	(Romania) ROU	Costel Pantilimon	13	0	13	0	0	0	0	0
2	DF	(United States) USA	Eric Lichaj	28	3	22+1	1	2	2	3	0
3	DF	(Portugal) POR	Tobias Figueiredo	12	0	12	0	0	0	0	0
4	DF	(England) ENG	Michael Mancienne	33	0	27+2	0	2	0	2	0
5	MF	(Algeria) ALG	Adlène Guédioura	11	0	6+5	0	0	0	0	0
5	DF	(England) ENG	Matt Mills	15	0	11+2	0	0+1	0	1	0
6	DF	(Senegal) SEN	Armand Traoré	19	0	15+3	0	1	0	0	0
7	MF	(Scotland) SCO	Liam Bridcutt	27	1	24+3	1	0	0	0	0
8	MF	(England) ENG	Chris Cohen	3	0	0+2	0	0	0	1	0
9	FW	(Ireland) EIR	Daryl Murphy	28	7	22+5	7	0	0	0+1	0
10	MF	(Scotland) SCO	Barrie McKay	28	5	22+4	5	0+1	0	0+1	0
11	MF	(England) ENG	Ben Osborn	51	4	42+4	4	2	0	2+1	0
13	DF	(Scotland) SCO	Danny Fox	27	0	23	0	1	0	3	0
14	MF	(England) ENG	Matty Cash	25	2	14+9	2	2	0	0	0
15	FW	(England) ENG	Lee Tomlin	15	4	12+3	4	0	0	0	0
16	FW	(England) ENG	Zach Clough	17	0	4+9	0	1+1	0	1+1	0
17	FW	(England) ENG	Ben Brereton	39	6	25+10	5	2	1	1+1	0
18	MF	(The Gambia) GAM	Mustapha Carayol	17	2	2+13	1	1	0	1	1
18	MF	(England) ENG	Jack Colback	16	1	16	1	0	0	0	0
19	MF	(Northern Ireland) NIR	Jamie Ward	8	0	0+8	0	0	0	0	0
20	MF	(England) ENG	Kieran Dowell	43	10	31+7	9	2	1	3	0
21	MF	(United States) USA	Gboly Ariyibi	0	0	0	0	0	0	0	0
21	MF	(Iran) IRI	Ashkan Dejagah	1	0	0+1	0	0	0	0	0
23	FW	(England) ENG	Joe Lolley	16	3	13+3	3	0	0	0	0
24	MF	(Wales) WAL	David Vaughan	16	0	14	0	1+1	0	0	0
25	DF	(England) ENG	Jack Hobbs	5	0	2	0	0	0	2+1	0
26	GK	(Bulgaria) BUL	Dimitar Evtimov	1	0	0	0	0	0	1	0
27	DF	(Zimbabwe) ZIM	Tendayi Darikwa	32	1	29+1	0	0	0	0+2	1
29	DF	(Spain) ESP	Juan Fuentes	1	0	1	0	0	0	0	0
30	GK	(Ireland) EIR	Stephen Henderson	1	0	0	0	0	0	1	0
31	MF	(Greece) GRE	Andreas Bouchalakis	25	2	11+10	2	1	0	3	0
32	MF	(England) ENG	Ben Watson	14	0	14	0	0	0	0	0
33	GK	(Greece) GRE	Stefanos Kapino	4	0	4	0	0	0	0	0
34	FW	(England) ENG	Tyler Walker	16	4	7+5	3	0+1	0	1+2	1
35	FW	(Scotland) SCO	Jason Cummings	17	4	7+7	1	0	0	3	3
37	MF	(England) ENG	Jorge Grant	0	0	0	0	0	0	0	0
39	FW	(Greece) GRE	Apostolos Vellios	14	2	4+8	1	0+1	1	1	0
42	DF	(England) ENG	Joe Worrall	35	1	28+3	1	2	0	2	0
43	GK	(England) ENG	Jordan Smith	32	0	29	0	2	0	1	0

=== Goal scorers ===
As of match played 6 May 2018

Rank	No.	Position	Player	EFL Championship	FA Cup	EFL Cup	Total
1	20	Midfielder	Kieran Dowell	9	1	0	10
2	9	Forward	Daryl Murphy	7	0	0	7
3	17	Forward	Ben Brereton	5	1	0	6
4	10	Midfielder	Barrie McKay	5	0	0	5
5	11	Midfielder	Ben Osborn	4	0	0	4
5	15	Forward	Lee Tomlin	4	0	0	4
5	34	Forward	Tyler Walker	3	0	1	4
5	35	Forward	Jason Cummings	1	0	3	4
6	2	Defender	Eric Lichaj	1	2	0	3
6	23	Forward	Joe Lolley	3	0	0	3
7	14	Midfielder	Matty Cash	2	0	0	2
7	18	Midfielder	Mustapha Carayol	1	0	1	2
7	31	Midfielder	Andreas Bouchalakis	2	0	0	2
7	39	Forward	Apostolos Vellios	1	1	0	2
8	7	Midfielder	Liam Bridcutt	1	0	0	1
8	18	Midfielder	Jack Colback	1	0	0	1
8	27	Defender	Tendayi Darikwa	0	0	1	1
8	42	Defender	Joe Worrall	1	0	0	1
TOTAL				51	5	6	62

=== Disciplinary record ===
As of match played 6 May 2018

No.	Position	Player	EFL Championship		FA Cup		EFL Cup		Total	
No.	Position	Player	Booked	Sent off (straight red)	Booked	Sent off (straight red)	Booked	Sent off (straight red)	Booked	Sent off (straight red)
7	Midfielder	Liam Bridcutt	11	0	0	0	0	0	11	0
13	Defender	Danny Fox	8	0	1	0	1	0	10	0
42	Defender	Joe Worrall	4	0	2	1	1	0	7	1
27	Defender	Tendayi Darikwa	7	0	0	0	0	0	7	0
5	Defender	Matt Mills	6	0	0	0	0	0	6	0
17	Forward	Ben Brereton	6	0	0	0	0	0	6	0
18	Midfielder	Jack Colback	6	0	0	0	0	0	6	0
20	Midfielder	Kieran Dowell	6	0	0	0	0	0	6	0
3	Defender	Tobias Figueiredo	5	0	0	0	0	0	5	0
4	Defender	Michael Mancienne	4	0	0	0	1	0	5	0
24	Midfielder	David Vaughan	4	0	0	0	0	0	4	0
32	Midfielder	Ben Watson	4	0	0	0	0	0	4	0
2	Defender	Eric Lichaj	3	1	0	0	0	0	3	1
6	Defender	Armand Traoré	3	0	0	0	0	0	3	0
11	Midfielder	Ben Osborn	3	0	0	0	0	0	3	0
15	Forward	Lee Tomlin	3	0	0	0	0	0	3	0
5	Midfielder	Adlène Guédioura	2	0	0	0	0	0	2	0
31	Midfielder	Andreas Bouchalakis	2	0	0	0	0	0	2	0
34	Forward	Tyler Walker	2	0	0	0	0	0	2	0
35	Forward	Jason Cummings	1	0	0	0	1	0	2	0
1	Goalkeeper	Costel Pantilimon	1	0	0	0	0	0	1	0
14	Midfielder	Matty Cash	1	0	0	0	0	0	1	0
18	Midfielder	Mustapha Carayol	1	0	0	0	0	0	1	0
19	Midfielder	Jamie Ward	1	0	0	0	0	0	1	0
23	Forward	Joe Lolley	1	0	0	0	0	0	1	0
25	Defender	Jack Hobbs	0	0	0	0	1	0	1	0
TOTAL			95	1	3	1	5	0	103	2

== Awards ==
=== Club ===
Player of the Season

Result	Nationality	Player	Ref
Won	ENG	Ben Osborn	
Runner-up	ENG	Matty Cash	

=== League ===
EFL Team of the Week

Week	Result	Player	Ref
2	Won	Andreas Bouchalakis	

Sky Bet Goal of the Month

Month	Result	Player	Ref
August	Nominated	Andreas Bouchalakis	
September	Nominated	Mustapha Carayol	

=== Cup ===
EFL Cup Team of the Round

Round	Result	Player	Ref
2	Won	Joe Worrall	
