= Gerry McDonagh =

Irish association football player

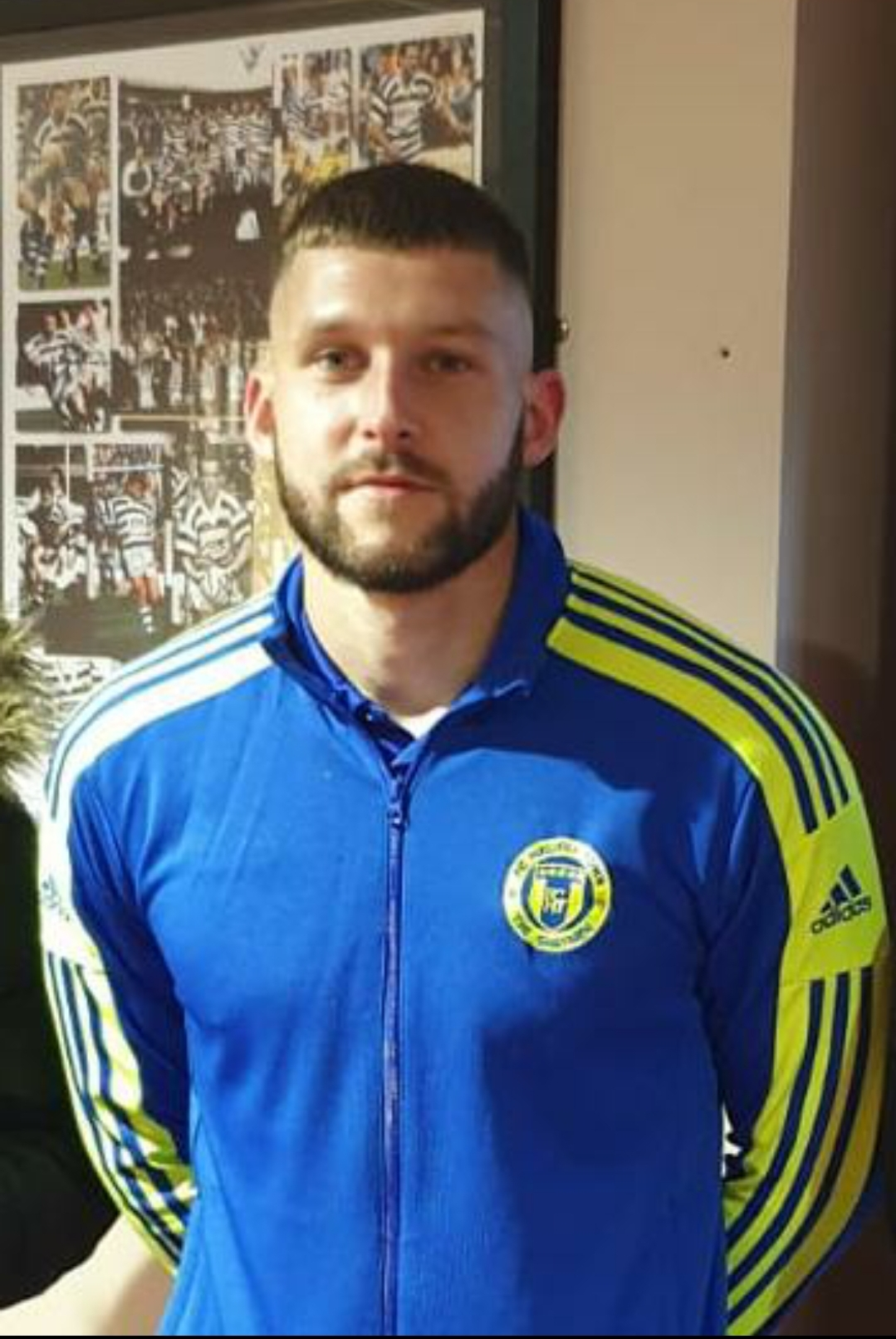
- Gerry McDonagh pictured for FC Halifax Town in 2021

Personal information
- Full name: Gerry Luke McDonagh
- Date of birth: 14 February 1998 (age 28)
- Place of birth: Dublin, Ireland
- Position: Forward

Youth career
- 2013–2015: Nottingham Forest

Senior career*
Years	Team	Apps	(Gls)
2015–2018	Nottingham Forest	1	(0)
2016–2017	→ Wrexham (loan)	22	(5)
2017	→ Cambridge United (loan)	13	(1)
2017–2018	→ Tranmere Rovers (loan)	8	(0)
2018–2019	Barnsley	0	(0)
2018–2019	→ Aldershot Town (loan)	4	(0)
2019	Aldershot Town	9	(0)
2020	Tamworth	6	(1)
2021–2022	FC Halifax Town	14	(1)
2021–2022	→ Kettering Town (loan)	7	(2)
2022–2023	Cove Rangers	15	(2)
2023	Scunthorpe United	4	(1)
2023	Eastleigh	8	(1)
2023–2024	Kidderminster Harriers	15	(1)
2024	→ Alfreton Town (loan)	18	(2)
2024	Rushall Olympic	18	(1)
2024–2026	Alfreton Town	46	(1)

International career^{‡}
2014–2015	Republic of Ireland U17	5	(1)
- * Club domestic league appearances and goals as of 16:17, 2 June 2025 (UTC) ‡ National team caps and goals as of 11:00, 11 November 2020 (UTC)

Gerry Luke McDonagh (born 14 February 1998) is an Irish footballer who last played as a forward for Northern Premier League Premier Division club Alfreton Town.

In his career, McDonagh has played in the English Football League for Nottingham Forest, Cambridge United and Tranmere Rovers. He is a former Ireland U19 International.

== Playing career ==
=== Nottingham Forest ===
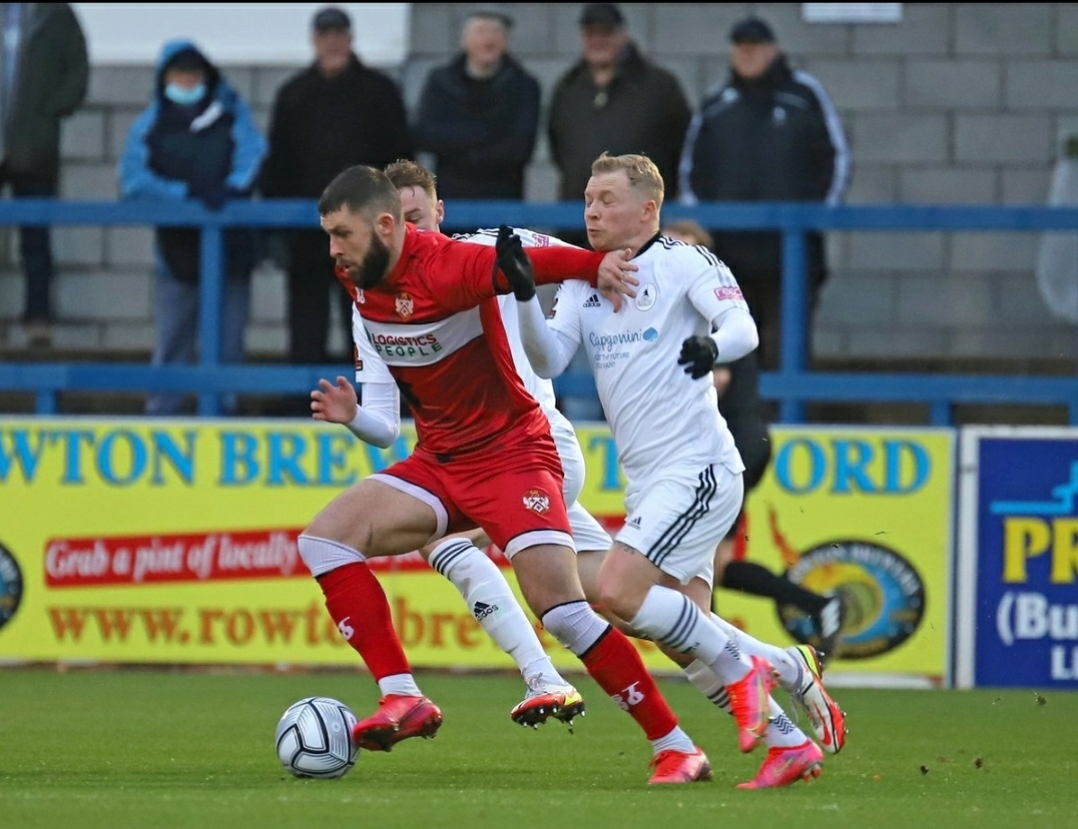
Gerry McDonagh playing for Kettering Town FC on loan from FC Halifax Town in 2021

After two years playing at the Nottingham Forest academy, McDonagh made his professional debut as an 80th-minute substitute during a 2–1 loss against Cardiff City on 29 August 2015. In July 2016, McDonagh joined National League side Wrexham on an initial one-month loan deal as cover for the injured Jordan White. McDonagh showed his delight at the prospect of playing first-team football, claiming the loan would be "a good experience as a young player coming in from Nottingham Forest".

McDonagh made his debut for Wrexham as a substitute in place of Shaun Harrad during a 3–2 victory over Guiseley on 9 August 2016, scoring his first senior career goal. Both Harrad and McDonagh scored as Wrexham defeated Bromley 2–1 on 24 October, with Harrad hailing their partnership up front; "Once you've got one striker committing, the other one gets the drop downs". On 26 November McDonagh scored his first career brace as Wrexham defeated Forest Green Rovers 3–1. His strike partner Harrad scored Wrexham's other goal of the game. On 3 January 2017 McDonagh returned to Nottingham Forest, having scored five goals in twenty-one appearances for Wrexham following an "outstanding" spell at the Welsh club. On 21 January McDonagh was again sent out on loan, this time to EFL League Two club Cambridge United. McDonagh made his debut the same day as a 61st-minute substitute during a 1–3 defeat by Mansfield Town

On 7 July 2017, McDonagh was one of four academy players at Forest to renew his contract ahead of the 2017-18 season, although the length of that contract was not disclosed by the club.

It was confirmed on 27 April 2018 that Gerry had left Nottingham Forest, following the expiry of his contract.

=== Barnsley ===
Gerry joined League One side Barnsley on 9 August 2018, with the player linking up with the club's U23 squad managed by Martin Devaney.

=== Aldershot Town ===
Gerry signed for National League side Aldershot Town on a youth loan on 7 December 2018. McDonagh made his debut the following day, in a 4–1 away defeat to Harrogate Town.

On 9 January 2019, Aldershot Town made McDonagh's loan deal permanent and signed him on a free transfer. Gerry made 13 appearances in total for Aldershot Town, and departed the club at the end of the 2018–19 season.

=== Tamworth ===
McDonagh signed for Southern League Premier Central side Tamworth on 26 February 2020. McDonagh made his debut for Tamworth on 7 March 2020, in a home fixture against Stratford Town which the home team won 4–1.

On 19 September 2020, Tamworth confirmed that Gerry had re-signed for the Southern League Premier Division Central club for the 2020–21 season. McDonagh appeared on the opening day of the season as Tamworth drew 1–1 away at Peterborough Sports, with Gerry coming on as an 82nd-minute substitute for Lindon Meikle.

McDonagh started for Tamworth in a Southern League Premier Division Central home fixture against Barwell on 29 September 2020. Gerry scored his first goal for the club, on the 39th minute, McDonagh beat Barwell goalkeeper Max Bramley to a through ball to head over the goalkeeper, despite the best efforts of defender Jayden Cotterill the ball found its way over the line. The goal proved to be the match winner, with Tamworth running out 2–1 winners.

=== FC Halifax Town ===
On 20 August 2021, he signed for National League side FC Halifax Town after a successful trial with the club. On 4 November 2021, McDonagh joined National League North side Kettering Town on a one-month loan deal. He scored his first goal for the club in a 4–0 win against Blyth Spartans. On 6 December 2021, the loan was extended for a further month, where he would score 2 goals and 2 assists in 5 games during his loan period.

=== Scunthorpe United ===
On 2 February 2023, McDonagh signed for Scunthorpe United following a spell with Scottish Championship side Cove Rangers.

=== Eastleigh ===
On 11 March 2023, McDonagh joined fellow National League club Eastleigh after just four appearances for Scunthorpe United. He was released by the club at the end of the season.

=== Kidderminster Harriers ===
On 26 June 2023, McDonagh signed for newly promoted National League club Kidderminster Harriers on a one-year deal.

In January 2024, McDonagh joined National League North club Alfreton Town on loan for the remainder of the season.

=== Rushall Olympic ===
In July 2024, McDonagh joined National League North side Rushall Olympic. In December 2024, he was released from his contract.

=== Alfreton Town ===
On 24 December 2024, McDonagh returned to Alfreton Town on a permanent basis. He rejected the offer of a new contract at the end of the 2024–25 season, subsequently departing the club.

== International career ==
=== Republic of Ireland U17 ===
McDonagh was called up by Republic of Ireland U17 in March 2014, and scored on his debut against Austria U17. Gerry went on to gain five caps, scoring one goal.

== Career statistics ==
As of end of 2024–25 season

Club	Season	League			National Cup (Note: Includes appearances in FA Cup and Scottish Cup)		League Cup		Other		Total	
Club	Season	Division	Apps	Goals	Apps	Goals	Apps	Goals	Apps	Goals	Apps	Goals
Nottingham Forest	2015–16	Championship	1	0	0	0	0	0	—		1	0
Nottingham Forest	2016–17	Championship	0	0	0	0	0	0	—		0	0
Nottingham Forest	2017–18	Championship	0	0	0	0	0	0	—		0	0
Nottingham Forest	Total		1	0	0	0	0	0	—		1	0
Wrexham (loan)	2016–17	National League	22	5	0	0	—		0	0	22	5
Cambridge United (loan)	2016–17	League Two	13	1	0	0	0	0	—		13	1
Tranmere Rovers (loan)	2017–18	National League	8	0	3	0	—		0	0	11	0
Barnsley	2018–19	League One	0	0	0	0	0	0	0	0	0	0
Aldershot Town (loan)	2018–19	National League	4	0	0	0	—		1	1	4	1
Aldershot Town	2018–19	National League	9	0	0	0	—		0	0	9	0
Tamworth	2019–20	Southern League Premier Central	1	0	0	0	—		0	0	1	0
Tamworth	2020–21	Southern League Premier Central	5	1	2	0	—		0	0	7	1
Tamworth	Total		6	1	2	0	0	0	0	0	8	1
FC Halifax Town	2021–22	National League	13	1	0	0	—		1	0	14	1
Kettering Town (loan)	2021–22	National League North	7	2	0	0	—		0	0	7	2
Cove Rangers	2022–23	Scottish Championship	15	2	1	4	4	0	1	0	21	6
Scunthorpe United	2022–23	National League	4	1	0	0	—		0	0	4	1
Kidderminster Harriers	2023–24	National League	15	1	2	0	—		0	0	17	1
Alfreton Town (loan)	2023–24	National League North	18	2	0	0	—		0	0	18	2
Rushall Olympic	2024–25	National League North	18	1	5	0	—		1	0	24	1
Alfreton Town	2024–25	National League North	15	1	0	0	—		0	0	15	1
Career Total			168	18	13	4	1	0	4	1	190	23
