= Ilias Polimos =

Greek footballer

Personal information
- Date of birth: 1 September 1995 (age 31)
- Place of birth: Kalamata, Greece
- Height: 1.79 m (5 ft 10 in)
- Position: Right-back

Team information
- Current team: Ilioupoli

Youth career
- 2011–2013: Panionios
- 2013–2015: Nottingham Forest

Senior career*
Years	Team	Apps	(Gls)
2015–2016	Panionios	0	(0)
2016	→ Acharnaikos (loan)	11	(0)
2016–2017	Panthrakikos	14	(0)
2017–2020	Panachaiki	66	(2)
2020	Ionikos	5	(0)
2020–2021	Niki Volos	15	(0)
2021–2022	Xanthi	13	(0)
2022–	Ilioupoli	0	(0)

International career^{‡}
2013	Greece U18	5	(0)
2013–2014	Greece U19	10	(1)
- * Club domestic league appearances and goals as of 30 March 2022 ‡ National team caps and goals as of 2 June 2014

Ilias Polimos (Greek: Ηλίας Πολίμος; born 1 September 1995) is a Greek professional footballer who plays as a right-back.
